= Mahjoub =

Mahjoub (Arabic: مَحْجُوب, [maħ.d͡ʒuːb]; from the adjective مَحْجُوب (maḥjūb) with the meaning "invisible", "veiled", "hidden", "covered", "blocked") is a Muslim Arabic male given name (it exists the female version Mahjouba (Arabic: محجوبة)) and surname. Other romanizations from the Arabic script include Mahdjoub, Mahjub, Mahdschub, Mahjoob, Mahgoub, Mahgub and Mahgoob. Notable people with this name include:

== Surname ==
- A. Monem Mahjoub (born 1963), Libyan linguist, philosopher, poet, historian, and political critic
- Abderrahmane Mahjoub (1929–2011), French-Moroccan footballer
- Alireza Mahjoub (born 1958), Iranian politician
- Jamal Mahjoub (born 1966), British-Sudanese writer
- Javad Mahjoub (born 1991), Iranian judoka
- Mohammad Jafar Mahjoub (1924–1996), Iranian scholar
- Mohammad Zeki Mahjoub, Egyptian national imprisoned in Canada
- Morteza Mahjoub (born 1980), Iranian chess grandmaster
- Said Mustapha Mahdjoub, adopted Islamic name of the French soldier and mercenary Robert Denard (1929–2007)
- Semir Mahjoub (born 1964), Swedish-Tunisian businessman

== Masculine given name ==
- Mahjoub Haïda (born 1970), retired Moroccan middle distance runner
- Mahjoub Mohamed Salih (born 1929), Sudanese journalist
- Mahjoub Sharif (1948–2014), Sudanese poet, teacher and activist
- Mahjoub Tobji (born 1942), retired Moroccan army commandant

== See also ==
- Mahjouba (disambiguation), name of two settlements in North Africa
- Mahjoubi, Maghrebi Arabic surname
- Mahjouba Oubtil (born 1982), Moroccan female boxer
