= ZeeZee Adel =

Egyptian singer

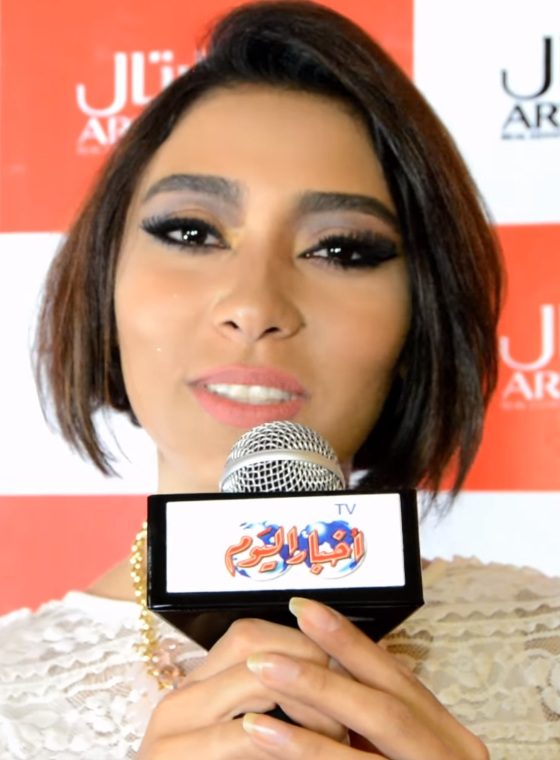
- Zizi, 25 June 2016

Background information
- Birth name: ZeeZee Adel Abdullah زيزى عادل عبد الله
- Born: 26 October 1987 (age 37)
- Origin: Cairo, Egypt
- Genres: World, Arabic
- Occupation: Singer
- Years active: 2005—present
- Labels: Lotus Music

ZeeZee Adel (also transliterated as Zizi and Zeze, Arabic: زيزى عادل pronounced [ˈziːzi ˈʕæːdel]; born 26 October 1987, Kuwait) is an Egyptian singer. Zizi first came to attention when she entered the second series of Star Academy in 2005, coming third to Hisham Abdulrahman and Amani Swissi after reaching the semi-final.

== After Star Academy ==
After Star Academy, Zizi Adel signed a contract with Rotana in 2007. Her debut album, Wahad Tayib Kbeeeeeer Awi (One Good Package), released in 2007, was composed of eight songs including Hobbo Eja Alayah (Unaccounted Premature Fire) and Wahad Tani (One more time wink wink).

Zizi Adel won ART's Best New Artist and Zahrat Al Kaleej's Best Album of 2007. She studied at the Institute of Arabic Music.

Adel's second album, released in 2009, is Waed Alia (Promised High), featuring 10 songs.

== Discography ==
=== Albums ===
- 2007: Wahda Tayiba
- 2009: Waed Alia
