= Mina Atta =

Egyptian singer and radio announcer

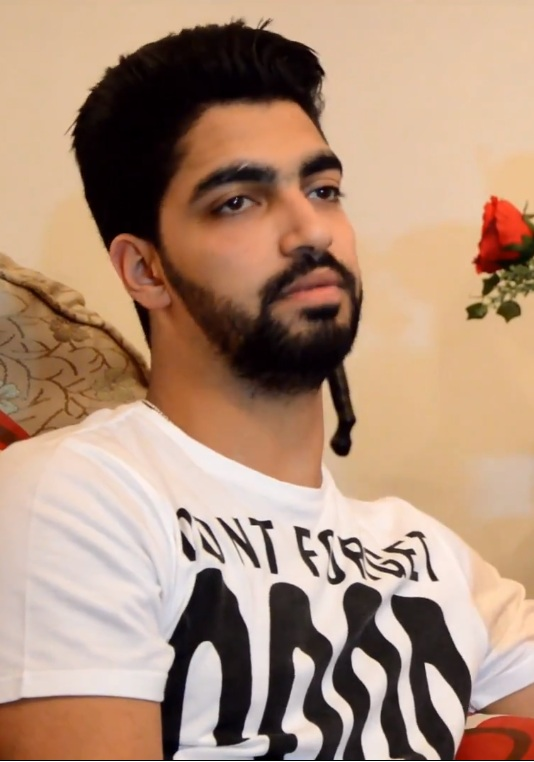
- Mina Atta, 23 June 2015
- Born: Mina Atta; 18 January 1990 (age 36); Egypt
- Occupation: Singer ، radio announcer
- Years active: 2014–present

Mina Atta (Arabic: مينا عطا [ˈmiːnæ ˈʕɑtˤɑ]) is an Egyptian singer and radio announcer. He participated in the tenth season of Star Academy Arab World, finishing in 4th place.

== Biography ==
Atta began singing at the age of 9, when he was discovered by his music teacher and promoted in school talent shows, which encouraged him to develop his talent. Atta is a guitar and piano player as well as a singer, and also a composer, having written the song "Great Stay You" for his friend and Star Academy colleague Elie Elia.

== Work ==
=== Star Academy ===
Atta participated in the tenth season of Star Academy, leaving the competition just before the finals in 4th place.

=== Singles ===
- Hala Mo'akkata
- Tamaly Betgher
- Ana Mesh Hasibak
- Ana El Saheb
- Sortek Fi Alby
- Ayam Betfot
- Mogabeen
- Ma Odty Teshely Homom
- Anqoud El Enab

=== Videos ===
- Masr El-Bagad
- Fe Mser Bas
- Ana El Sa7eb

== Awards and honors ==
- Atta was honored by Dr. Susan Keliny, Dean of the Faculty of Arts at Ain Shams University
- Atta was awarded "Best Up and Coming Singer" at the Middle East Music Awards in 2015
