= Soukaina Boukries =

Moroccan singer (born 1988)

Soukaina Boukries سكينة بوخريص
- Born: Soukaina Boukries; 18 March 1988 (age 38); Fes, Morocco
- Genres: Pop, jazz, Moroccan pop, Middle Eastern music.
- Occupation: Singer
- Years active: 2013–present
- Website: SoukainaBoukries.com

Soukaina Boukries (Arabic: سكينة بوخريص, born 18 March 1988) is a Moroccan singer who rose to popularity as a contestant in both the 9th season of Studio 2M and the 9th season of Star Academy Arab World.

== Studio 2M 2012 ==
Soukaina Boukries participated in the 9th season of the show Studio 2M in Morocco and reached the semi-finals of this program after it was exclusion by the Committee.

=== Performances in Studio 2M 2012 ===
- 1st Prime : Unfaithful - Rihanna
- 2nd Prime : Waka Waka - Shakira
- 3rd Prime : You Lost Me - Christina Aguilera
- 4th Prime : Firework - Katy Perry
- 5th Prime : Pour que tu m'aimes encore - Celine Dion

== Star Academy 9 ==
Soukaina Boukries competed in the 9th season of the show Star Academy Arab World. She went on to also win the title of 'Shakira Arab' and the title of 'The Diamond'. Soukaina was nominated Thrice on the show. During her first nomination she was brought back by public vote. During her second nomination she was brought back again by public vote, achieving the highest vote percentage (77.31%) of this season. During her third nomination in Semi-final, she came out of the competition by a narrow margin in the vote (49.88%).

== Ajmal Snin Omrina ==
Soukaina Boukries has participated in Ajmel Snin Omrina on CBC, she presented nine shows in six episodes in this program which is produced by Endemol Middle East 2014.

=== Performances in Ajmal Snin Omrina ===
- 1st Performance : I Wanna Be Loved By You - Marilyn Monroe
- 2nd Performance : La vie en Rose - Edith Piaf
- 3rd Performance : I Have Nothing - Whitney Houston
- 4th Performance : My heart will go on - Celine Dion
- 5th Performance : Voulez vous - ABBA
- 6th Performance : Ahssan Nass - Dalida
- 7th Performance : Bessame Mucho - Dalida
- 8th Performance : Helwa Ya Baladi - Dalida
- 9th Performance : That's the way I like it - KC and The Sunshine Band

== Discography ==
=== Singles ===
- Tghazzal Fiyyi (Arabic: تغزّل فيي)

== Awards ==
- She won the title of " The Best Talent in Arab World 2014 " by referendum.
- Soukaina Boukries was nominated by public vote in Shorty Awards.
- Soukaina Boukries won the Lebanon Awards (SuperStar of Tomorrow) in 2015.

Year	Nominee / work	Award	Result
2014	Best Singer	Shorty Awards	Nominated
2015	Best Singer	Shorty Awards	Nominated
2015	SuperStar of Tomorrow	Lebanon Awards	Won

== Social media ==
- Facebook
- Twitter
- Instagram
