= Mahjouba =

Mahjouba may refer to the following places in North Africa:

- Mahjouba, Morocco
- Mahjouba, Tunisia
