= Ali Doukhei =

- علي الدوخي
- Born: Ali Doukhei; 1 July 1988 (age 38); Lebanon
- Education: American University of Beirut
- Years active: 2009–present
- Known for: Journalist – Digital media consultant

Ali Doukhei (in Arabic:على الدوخي ) is a Lebanese journalist and digital media consultant

== Early life ==
Ali was born in Lebanon. He started his career as a journalist. He studied at American University of Science & Technology.

== Career ==
Ali Doukhei started his journalism career at the early age of 23 in 2011, at Musicnation, an entertainment online magazine. Then he moved to the Number one E-Magazine in Lebanon ElFann where he succeeded in interviewing major Arab stars such as; Maya Diab, Ragheb Alama, Myriam Fares, Samira Said, and many others.

Before joining Endemol Middle East Production as Digital media coordinator for star academy Season 9 and 10, Ali worked as a reporter for several household names in the Arab media industry; and he work also as assistant producer for the largest TV shows in the middle east, The Voice Season 3, The Voice Kids Season 1, Sout Al Hayat, Ajmal Snin Omrena, Ana Zahra Junior, and many others.

When he turned 28, Ali took the editor-in-chief position at iStarMag.com in August 2016. Recently, he started working also as digital media producer in iDigital Production.

== Accomplishments ==
- Journalist (elfann.com, musicnation.me)
- Reporter (elfann.com, musicnation.me)
- Digital media coordinator (Star Academy 9 &10, Ajmal Snin Omrena, Tanne W Ghanneh, Sout El Hayat, Ana Zahra Junior 1&2 )
- Digital media producer (Murex Dor 2016, Mr Lebanon 2016/2017, Desert Force)
- Production Coordinator (the voice 3, the voice kids 1)
- Producer assistant (the voice)
- Assistant content producer جائزة الملك عبدالعزيز للادب الشعبي
- Media Consultant (georges wassouf, Madeleine Matar, Amar)
