= Joseph Attieh =

Lebanese singer

Joseph Attieh جوزيف عطية
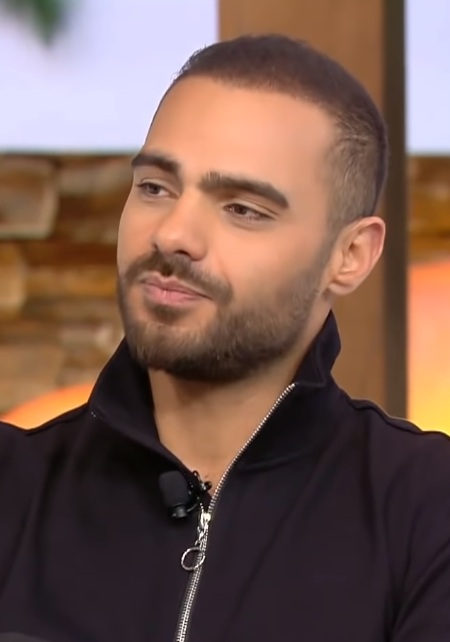
- Joseph Attieh guest of MTV Lebanon, 26 February 2020

Background information
- Born: May 14, 1987 (age 39); Batroun, Lebanon
- Genres: Arabic pop
- Occupations: Singer, songwriter, musician, actor, instrumentalist, writer, producer
- Instruments: Guitar, nai, piano, darbakeh
- Years active: 2005–present

Joseph Attieh (Arabic: جوزيف عطية, born May 14, 1987) is a Lebanese singer who won the third season of the Arab World's Star Academy in 2005. He is known for his song "Lebnan Rah Yerjaa".

== Career ==
Joseph Attieh, born in Batroun on May 14, 1987, rose to fame when he became the first Lebanese artist to win the pan-Arab version of Star Academy in 2005. In 2006, he released his first single entitled "La Trouhy" (Don't Go) and filmed a music video for it. The song became a best-seller in Lebanon and in the Middle East.

His second single "Nahle" (A Bee), was released in 2007. Joseph then released his third single "Habeit Oyounak" (I Like Your Eyes) which he sang during the final of the fifth season of Star Academy. The music video for the song marked his second music video.

In 2008, he released a patriotic song which came to be his biggest hit to date. Titled "El Haq Ma Beymout" or "Lebnan Rah Yerjaa", it won him his first Murex d'Or award in 2009. Later that year, he released his first Egyptian song "Lina Rab" as a theme song for an Egyptian movie.

In February 2010, Joseph released his first album "Mawhoum" produced by Star System. The album included 7 new songs: "Habibi El Gharam", "Teeb El Shouq", "Temthal", "Fiky", "Lamma El Kelma", "Ghayeb Habib El Rouh" and "Mawhoum". Among these songs, he filmed "Mawhoum", "Teeb El Shouq", and "Habibi El Gharam" as video clips which he directed himself. That same year, he was nominated for Best Arabian Act at the MTV Europe Music Awards.

In August 2012, he launched his second album "Chou Btaemel Bel Nass" produced by Star System during a concert in Beirut. It included 9 new songs: "Chou Btaemel Bel Nass", "Sodfi Gharibe", "Al Wared", "Aallama", "Kelma Bshoufik", "Wajaa El Zekrayat", "Rayhin Ala Betna", "Fare El Omor" and "Ma Bhab". The following year, the album won him his second Murex d'Or Award for "Best Album".

In March 2015, Joseph released his third album “Hobb W Mkattar” (Love And More), which included: “Min Jdid”, “Eiwiha”, “La Tkhallini”, “Kel Ma El Masa Bi Tol”, “Damaato”, “Kilme Elak”, “Ya Kezabi”, “Weilak”, “Akbar Mennon Kellon” and “Helwa”.

In November 2017, Joseph released his fourth album "Al Aghani Li Amelta Elik“ (The Songs I Made For You). It included “Tghayari”, “Ghalta Tani“, “Ma Bestaghni”, “Al Oula“, “Shimali” “Shou Helwi”, “Aw'at” “Entaha Mawdou'na”, “Enti Al Layali”, “Ella Enta”, “Rouh”, “Yey”, "Manno Jereh”, and a piano version of “Ella Enta".

Between 2018 and 2022, he released multiple singles, including “Omer Aasal”, "Khatt Ahmar", "Hafzek Aan El Ghayeb", "Nass Bwab", "Tabii" and "Yenaad Aalayk".

In 2022, he released his fifth studio album "Mnehkom Aal Nas".

Since then, he has released multiple singles including "Jamal", "Koun", "Baghdada", "Hawas", "Wala Ghalta" featuring Elyanna, and "Wala Momken".

== Discography ==
=== Studio albums ===
Title	Details
Mawhoum	Released: February 16, 2010; Label: Star System; Format: CD, digital download, streaming
Shou Btaamel Bel Nass	Released: October 2013; Label: Star System; Format: CD, digital download, streaming
Hobb W Mkattar	Released: April 8, 2015; Label: Star System; Format: CD, digital download, streaming
Al Aghani Li Amelta Elik	Released: November 10, 2017; Label: self-publishing; Format: CD, digital download, streaming
Mnehkom Aal Nas	Released: December 16, 2021; Label: Watary; Format: digital download, streaming
Fi Kol Makan	Released: September 18, 2025; Label: Watary; Format: digital download, streaming

=== Singles ===
List of singles, with selected chart positions, showing year released and album name
Title	Year	Peak chart positions	Album
Title	Year	LBN	Album
"La Trouhi"	2010	—	Mawhoum
"Lina Rab"	2010	—	
"Bawastik"	2012	5	Chou Btaamil Bel Nass
"Chou Btaamil Bel Nass"	2012	7	Chou Btaamil Bel Nass
"Weilak"	2013	4	Hobb W Mkattar
"Watani"	2014	18	
"Hob W Makattar"	2015	2	Hobb W Mkattar
"Yey"	2016	1	
"Taret Metl El Nahli"	2016	—	
"Rouh"	2017	3	
"Tghayyari"	2017	1	
"Omer Aasal"	2018	1	
"Hdiyet Hobbak"	2018	—	
"Baayouni" (Anghami Originals)"	2019	—	
"Lahza"	2019	11	
"Ghazala" (featuring Kiki C)	2019	1	
"Lebnan Rah Yerja3/Li Beirut (Piano Cover)"	2019	7	
"Hafzek 3an Ghayeb"	2020	13	
"Khat Ahmar"	2020	11	
"Sallou La Beirut"	2020	20	
"El Nass Bwab"	2020	—	
"Tabii" (featuring Ramy Chalhoub)	2021	1	
"Helween" (featuring Rodge)	2021	1	
"3al Helwe Wel Murra"	2021	18	
"Yenaad Alayk"	2021	—	
"Bde'ellak"	2022	15	
"Mnehkom Aal Nas"	2022	13	
"Melki W Bass"	2022	14	
"Tlaqina Tani" (featuring Faudel)	2022	12	
"Jamala"	2022	4	
"Habbayta"	2022	—	
"Bala Oshaq"	2022	—	
"Ella El Jafa"	2022	—	
"Baaref Maslehtak"	2022	—	
"El Hobb Aafawi"	2022	—	
"Wahdani"	2022	—	
"Koun"	2023	15	
"El Baghdada"	2023	2	
"Hader Halak"	2024	—	
"Sana Helwa"	2024	—	
"Wala Ghalta" (featuring Elyanna)	2024	9	
"Hawas"	2025	—	
"Salam"	2025	—	
"Alf Shakhs"	2025	—	
"–" denotes a recording that did not chart or was not released in that territory.

== Awards and nominations ==
Year	Award	Category	Work	Result	Ref.
2008	Murex d'Or Lebanon	Best Song	"El Haq Ma Beymout"	Won	—
2010	MTV Europe Music Awards	Best Arabian Act	Himself	Nominated	
2011	Murex d'Or Lebanon	Best Male Singer	Himself	Won	
2013	Murex d'Or Lebanon	Best Album	"Chou Btaemel Bel Nass"	Won	—
