= Fadee Andrawos =

Fadee Andrawos فادي أندراوس
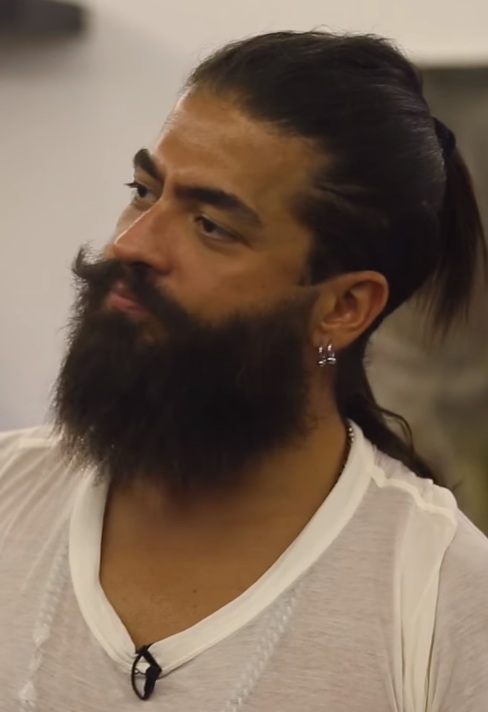
- Fadee Andrawos, Star Academy Arabia, 21 July 2016

Background information
- Born: 21 October 1981 (age 45); Beirut, Lebanon
- Genres: Rock, Dance, Oriental
- Website: www.fadyandraosstar.com

Fadee Andrawos (Arabic: فادي أندراوس; born 21 October 1981) is a Lebanese singer and actor of Palestinian origin. He debuted on television when he appeared on the third edition of Star Academy Arab World representing Palestine in December 2005 and remained until the semi-finals.

He later went on to star in his own sitcom Fadi w Radi (Fadi and Radi), which aired on LBCI.

== Biography ==
Fadee Andrawos was born and raised in Beirut, Lebanon, to a Christian family. His father is Palestinian and his mother is Lebanese.

== Music career ==
=== Singles ===
- 2007: B2alby Dally / بقلبي ضلي
- 2007: Bnam w Ba7lam Fik / بنام و بحلم فيك
- 2008: Hayda Mesh Ana / هيدا مش أنا
- 2009: Falistine w Lebnan / فلسطين و لبنان
- 2010: Tla3y Menny / طلعي مني Fady Andraws - Tla'y Menny / فادى أندراوس - طلعي مني
- 2011: Shaddetny / شدتني
- 2011: Chiffon series song (Chou Sare) / (أغنية مسلسل شيفون (شو صار
- 2013: Maba3ref Koun / مابعرف كون
- 2013: Ma3ak / معاك
- 2014: Lamma Tkoun / لما تكون
- 2014: Hikayit Nase / حكاية نصر
- 2016: Ahwak Ahwak / أهواك اهواك
- 2019; Am Nelte2i / عم نلتقي

== Sitcoms ==
- 2006: Fadi w Radi / فادي و راضي
- 2008: Jeeran / جيران

== Series ==
- 2006: Fadi W Radi / فادي وراضي
- 2008: Jiran / جيران
- 2011: Chiffon / شيفون
- 2012: Sabaya (season IV) / (صبايا (الموسم الرابع1
- 2015: Solo elayl elhazin / صولو الليل الحزين
- 2018: Habibi al ladoud / حبيبي اللدود
- 2019: Hadoudet hob 2 (El3echk Elaswad) حدوتة حب 2 :العشق الأسود
- 2019: Ekhtirak / اختراق
