= Rola Saad (producer) =

Lebanese producer (born 1948)

Rola Saad رولا سعد
- Born: September 19, 1948 (age 77)
- Origin: Beirut, Lebanon
- Genres: Production, creativity
- Occupation: Producer

Rola Saad (Arabic: رولا سعد; born in Achrafieh, Beirut, Lebanon on September 9, 1948) is a Lebanese television personality and owner of Vanilla Productions. She is well known for her appearance in her number-one show in the Middle East Star Academy Arab World since 2004 on Lebanese Broadcasting Corporation (LBC). In July 2011, she completed the production of 8 full seasons of Star Academy.

== Biography ==
Her name has long been associated with breakthrough programs and innovative ideas which gained fame the world over. Due to the unrivaled success in the field of television and production, Roula Saad has become a media icon and a synonym for creative productions in the Middle East and the Arab world.

Roula Saad's portfolio extends to over 20 masterpieces spanning variety shows, reality TV, drama series, documentaries, all the way to video clips. Along with her specialized team of producers, Roula works closely with her clients, acting as a credible consultant and equipping them with all the necessary tools to make informed choices.

== Shows ==
=== Star Academy ===
This show revolves around 16–21 contestants that live in an isolated penthouse apartment for 4 months, with one of the contestants getting eliminated every week through a nomination process. Rola is the director of the academy too. The contestants get to showcase their talents in a weekly concert and perform on stage with various designs, dancers, solo performances, a cappella on piano sharing the stage with Arab and international singers. After 8 consecutive years of Star Academy seasons, the 9th marked the absence of Rola Saad for unknown reasons.

=== Celebrity Duets ===
Celebrity duets is a reality television show based on the American reality show Celebrity Duets. It combines celebrities from different parts of the Arab world and professional singers in a weekly elimination competition in front of specialized judges.

=== Splash ===
This show premiering for the first time in the Middle-East. It gathers various celebrities, from different domains, and they compete in different aquatic sports and games as diving and swimming. The stars are accompanied by an international group specialized in aquatic synchronized swimming shows.

=== Miss Lebanon ===
The Miss Lebanon beauty pageant takes place annually, in which contestants compete in a swimsuit, evening gown and question round of competition. The contestant with the highest overall score is crowned as Miss Lebanon, and is sent to represent Lebanon at Miss Universe and Miss World.
