= Cynthya Karam =

Lebanese actress (born 1980)

- سينتيا كرم
- Born: 11 July 1980 (age 46); Beit ed-Dine, Lebanon
- Education: Lebanese University
- Occupation: Actress
- Years active: 2003–present

Cynthya Karam (Arabic: سينتيا كرم; born 11 July 1980) is a Lebanese actress, singer, and television presenter known for her work in theater, television, and music. A graduate in theater from the Lebanese University, she first gained recognition as a contestant on the inaugural season of the pan-Arab talent show Star Academy in 2003. Karam has worked in Lebanese theatre and television, including several productions by Georges Khabbaz and the television series Bil-Damm (2025). Karam has also volunteered as a clown doctor and with hospital patients.

== Early life and education ==
Karam was born in Beit ed-Dine on 11 July 1980. Her father Kamal Wadih Karam, was a Lebanese Army general. Karam has recalled that her mother played piano, danced and watched musicals with her during her childhood. As a child, she also organized performances at home with neighborhood children. Karam grew up during the Lebanese Civil War. In a 2025 interview, Karam said that her parents' divorce had a strong effect on her. Initially enrolled at the Lebanese Academy of Fine Arts to study advertising, Karam's father suggested she transfers to the Lebanese University's Faculty of Arts to pursue her passion for theater. Her mother, who thought of theater as a hobby, did not support her decision. She eventually relented after witnessing her first stage performance.

== Career ==
She gained initial recognition as a contestant on the first season of Star Academy in 2003, a popular pan-Arab televised talent show, and the second reality television show in Arab TV history. In a 2025 interview with Lebanese journalist Nadya Tueini, Karam stated that she was unfamiliar with the specifics of the show prior to her participation. She joined Star Academy after being recommended by the Lebanese composer Ousama Rahbani. While studying at the Lebanese University, Rahbani was casting for a production of Romeo and Juliet and sought actors who could sing and dance. Upon learning of Karam's talents, he encouraged her to audition for the reality show, though she initially resisted due to her unfamiliarity with Arabic music.

In theater, Karam has played in various productions; notably, she performed in "Hadara" and "Nashid" directed by Gabriel Yammine, "Zilal" directed by Jihad El Andari, "Maamoul" and "Ghammed Ayn, Fatteh Ayn" in 2024 written and directed by Karim Shebli and Sara Abdo, and participated in the Jordanian Theater Festival with "Ayam Raba`iyat Al Khayyam" directed by Jabbar Hassan. She also starred in the comedy "Matloub" by Georges Khabbaz. In 2023 she played the role Nancy Nar, the Arabic counterpart of Roxie Hart in the Arabic rendition of Chicago. Karam's television credits include roles in series such as Syrian drama "Sana'udu baada Qalil" (2013), "Saqf al-Alam" (2007), and "Amnesia" (2021). She also appeared in the film "Bil Kanun" (2014), and Damascus Under Fire" (2018). Karam met writer Nadine Jaber in theater performance who cast her in the series Bil-Damm (In the Blood) in the role of Adla. Karam received increased media attention in 2025 for her portrayal of Adla in Bil-Damm. Her character's death in episode 26 prompted widespread discussion in Lebanese and regional entertainment media.

Karam has also performed as a singer, including appearances with other Star Academy participants.

== Personal life ==
Karam, then a volunteer with the Lebanese Red Cross, responded to the 12 December 2005 Mkalles bombing, an assassination attack targeting Gibran Tueni, a prominent Lebanese journalist, politician, and outspoken critic of Syria's military and political occupation of Lebanon. Initially, she mistook the blast for a factory explosion. Arriving at the scene after the detonation, she helped recover and carry Tueni's body. In 2016, Karam ran as a candidate for the municipal council of Beit ed-Dine, though she was not elected. Beyond her artistic career, Karam is involved in humanitarian work, volunteering as a clown doctor in hospitals, and caring for cancer and end-of-life patients, including in children's hospitals.

== Acting credits ==
=== Film ===
Year	Title	Role	Notes	Refs.
2014	Bil Kanoun	as herself		
2015	The Splinter	Woman 2	Short	
2018	Damascus Under Fire (Be Vaghte Sham/Damascus Time)	Om Salamah		
2018	Damascus Flight 2071			
2022	All Roads Lead to Rome (Aa Mafraa al-Tariq)	Sister Celestine		

=== Television ===
Year	Title	Role	Notes	Refs.
2003	Star Academy Arabia	Participant		
2006	Ossas Neswen			
2007	The World's Highest Plateau (Saqf al-Alam)			
2008	Al-Bir Hotel			
2008	Jehze la Jeze	Herself (host)	Al Aan TV	
2013	We Will Be Right Back (Sana'udu ba'da qalil)			
2021	Amnesia			
2021	The Visit (Az-Ziayara)	Vera		
2022	Bakkeer	Nora		
2023	Brando al-Sharq			
2025	Bil-Damm	Adla		

=== Theater ===
Year	Production	Role(s)	Playwright	Notes	Refs.
2002	Shadows (Zilal)		Jihad El Andari		
2006	Anthem (Nashid)		Gabriel Yammine		
2007	Public Bath (Hammam 'Moumi)		Aïda Sabra		
2008	Civilization (Hadara)		Gabriel Yammine		
2011	Wanted (Matloub)	Lea	Georges Khabbaz		
2012	El Awwal Bel Saf		Georges Khabbaz		
2013	Mich Mekhtelfin		Georges Khabbaz		
2014	Natrino		Georges Khabbaz		
2015	Behind the door (Wara al-Bab)		Georges Khabbaz		
2017	Unless (Illa Iza)		Georges Khabbaz		
2018	Home for Christmas		Bruno Tabbal		
2019	The Diaries of a Theater Actor (Yawmiyyet Masrahji)		Georges Khabbaz		
2022	Ayam Ruba`iyat Al-Khayyam		Jaber Hassan		
2022	Cocktail Maison		Bruno Tabbal		
2022	While Waiting for Noah (Nehna w Natrin Nouh)		Sara Abdo and Karim Shebli		
2023	Chicago the Musical Bel Arabi	Nancy Nar	Roy ElKhouri		
2023	Home for Christmas		Bruno Tabbal		
2024	Maamoul		Karim Shebli and Sara Abdo		
2024	Ghammed Ayn, Fatteh Ayn	Aïda	Karim Shebli and Sara Abdo		
2024	Shou Ya Ashta		Wafaa Halawi (writer), Riad Chirazi (Director)		
2024	L'Auberge de Noël		Bruno Tabbal		
2024	Le Periple de Celeste		Bruno Tabbal		
2024	Qoumi		Nadim Cherfan	voice	
2025	Ly Chabakna Ykhallesna	Nahia	Zeina Daccache		
