= Sofia El Marikh =

Musical artist

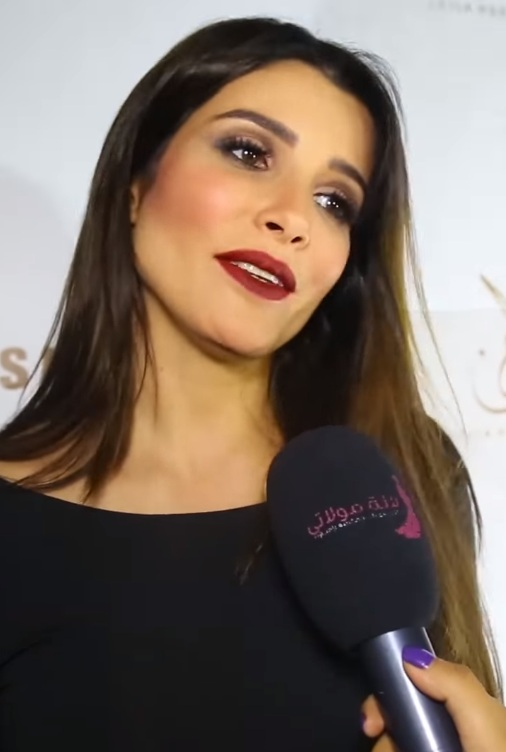
- Sofia El Marikh, 27 November 2017

Background information
- Born: Sofia Kareem El Marikh صوفيا كريم المريخ; October 15, 1981 (age 44); Casablanca, Morocco
- Genres: Arabic pop music, Arabic music, pop, Moroccan music
- Occupations: Singer, model, entertainer
- Years active: 2005–present

Sofia El Marikh (Arabic: صوفيا المريخ Moroccan pronunciation: [sofjɑ l.mærrix]; born October 15, 1981), also spelled Sophia El Mareekh, is a musician and entertainer from Casablanca, Morocco. She was a contestant on Star Academy I.

== Discography ==
=== Albums ===
- Kelmet Hobb 2007
- Tahwak 2011

=== Singles ===
- Tahwak (She Adores You)
- Nmout 3lik (I Love You till Death)
- Es'alni Ana (Ask Me)
- Bezzaf Bezaf (a lot, a lot)
- Baheb Feek (What I Love about You)
- Kelmet Hobb (Word of Love)

== Videography ==
- "Tahwak" – Wissam Smayra
- "Es'alni Ana" – Wissam Smayra
- "Baheb Feek" – Randa Alam
- "Kelmet hobb" – Laila Kanaan

== Social media ==
- Facebook
