= Marwan Youssef =

Lebanese singer (b. 1994)

Marwan Youssef مروان يوسف
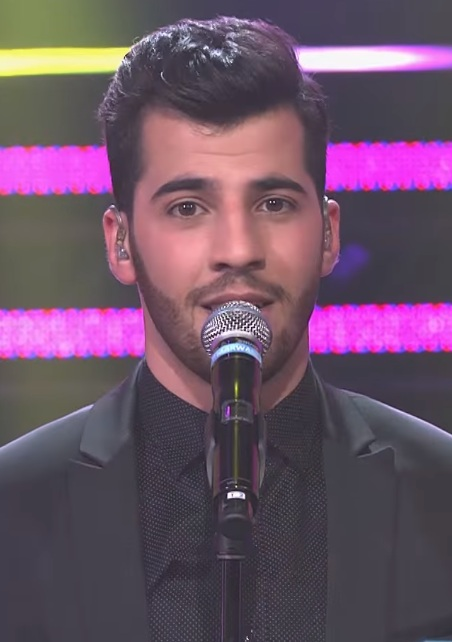
- Marwan Youssef,Star Academy Arabia 11, January 2016

Background information
- Born: 19 April 1994 (age 31); Byblos, Lebanon
- Origin: Lebanon
- Genres: Arabic music
- Occupation(s): Singer, songwriter, musician
- Instrument(s): Piano, al Oud
- Years active: 2015–present
- Labels: Endemol Shine Middle East (2015-present); Watary Productions (2015–present)

Marwan Youssef (Arabic: مروان يوسف born 19 April 1994) is a Lebanese singer and songwriter. He rose to fame when he won the 11th season of Star Academy in 2015–16. After his victory, Marwan released two singles and one music video, and performed many concerts in music festivals in the Arab World.

== Early life ==
Marwan Youssef' was born in to a family of Lebanese Christians. Marwan performed on TV before Star Academy on religious Christian TV channel NourSat.

== Career ==
=== Star Academy Arabia 11 and Watan Hobbi: 2015–2016 ===
Marwan Youssef entered season 11 of Star Academy as one of 18 contestants. Throughout his 4 months on the show, he was chosen twice as top student and never fell into the danger zone. Youssef won the final prime with 55.46% of the votes, beating the 3 other finalists. As one of his prizes, Marwan won a song produced by Endemol Shine Middle East, titled Watan Hobbi.

=== Rafed Saddek- present: 2016-present ===
Marwan released a second single "Rafed Saddek" and a music video under Watary Productions. The song performed well on Anghami. Marwan Youssef performed at many important festivals, such as Ehmej Festival.

== Discography ==
=== Singles ===
- 2016: Watan Hobbi
- 2017: Rafed Saddek

=== Music Videos ===
- 2017: Rafed Saddek

=== Live recordings ===
Marwan Youssef performed many songs live through his time on Star Academy, that can be found on Star Academy's YouTube Channel

== Recognition ==
- 2016: Murex d'Or Nomination for Best Lebanese New Talent Singer
