= Mahgoub =

Mahgoub or Mahjub is an Arabic surname that may refer to

- Abdel Khaliq Mahjub (1927–1971), Sudanese politician
- Ahmed Hassan Mahgoub (born 1993), Egyptian football player
- Kamal Mahgoub (born 1921), Egyptian weightlifter
- Mohamed Abdul Salam Mahgoub (1935–2022), Egyptian military officer
- El Muez Mahgoub (born 1978), Sudanese football goalkeeper
- Muhammad Ahmad Mahgoub (1908–1976), Sudanese politician
- Nesma Mahgoub (born 1989), Egyptian singer
- Rifaat el-Mahgoub (1926–1990), Egyptian politician
