= Abdulaziz Abdulrahman =

Saudi singer

- Born: Abdulaziz Abdulrahman Al Hamid عبد العزيز عبد الرحمن الحميد; 18 March 1982 (age 44); Tabuk, Saudi Arabia
- Genres: Arabic, World
- Occupations: Singer, businessman
- Years active: 2009–present
- Website: http://www.azoz-star.com/vb/

Abdulaziz Abdulrahman Al Hamid (Arabic: عبد العزيز عبد الرحمن الحميد; born 18 March 1982) is a Saudi singer who won the title of the sixth edition of the Arab version of Star Academy after a very close competition with the other two finalists. He got 50.3% of the votes with Bassma from Morocco as runner-up. He was the second Saudi to win the competition.

Abdulaziz Abdulrahman was born in Tabuk, Saudi Arabia on 18 March 1982 to a Saudi father and a Jordanian mother. He was successful as a businessman, and in 2009 he participated in Star Academy 6, turning from a career in finance to a singing career. Besides his singing, he is a good player of the oud. After his win he went on to release his debut single "Wafrod" (in Arabic وافرض) followed by a joint work with Abady al Jawhar entitled "Nahmadullah" (in Arabic نحمد الله) and a single in Iraqi style "Akhadoulou" (in Arabic أخذوله).

Recently, he made three songs, one with the artist Abadi Aljawher. The first song, entitled Wafrid, met with great success despite not having an associated video. He was honored in several festivals and events just months after winning the Star Academy program. Abdulrahman is working on his first album to include songs in Iraqi, Lebanese, Egyptian, and Gulf Arabic.

== Awards ==
- 2009 DG Festival Award – Best Rising male Singer.

== Discography ==
=== Singles ===
- Wafrod
- Nahmadullah
- Akhadoulou
