= Mahjoubi =

Mahjoubi is a surname. Notable people with the surname include:

- Mohamed Ali Mahjoubi (born 1966), retired Tunisian football player
- Mounir Mahjoubi (born 1984), French politician, minister for digital affairs

== See also ==
- Mahjoub
