= Hilda Khalife =

Lebanese TV presenter and model (born 1973)

Hilda Khalife هيلدا خليفة
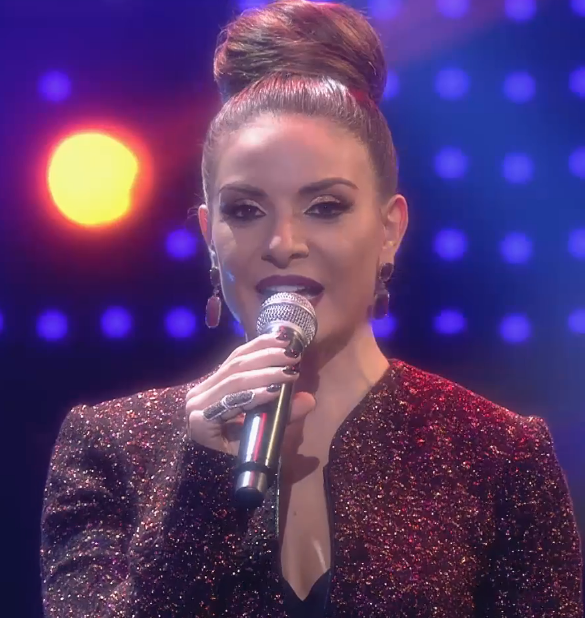
- Born: Hilda Khalife; August 9, 1973 (age 53); Zahlé, Lebanon
- Occupations: Television presenter, model
- Years active: 1996–present
- Notable credit: Star Academy (LBC)
- Spouse: Marc Moudabber (m. 2001)
- Children: 2

Hilda Khalife (Arabic: هيلدا خليفة; born August 9, 1973) is best known in the Arab world as a TV presenter. Despite her modeling career, Khalife's fame started in 2004 when she began hosting the first season of the pan-Arab televised talent show Star Academy Arab World on LBC, the Arabic adaptation of the French television show Star Academy produced by Netherlands company Endemol. She continued hosting the subsequent seasons of the show.

== Personal life ==
Hilda is a Lebanese TV presenter, daughter of Georges Khalife and Nohad Ghanem. She is a Maronite from the Beqaa who spent her early years in Australia, and has also lived in her parents' house in the region of Fiyadieh near Baabda.

She is married to a hotel owner in Kaslik near Jounieh, named Marc Moudabber and is the mother of a son named Sean and a daughter named Sienna.
