= Mahjouba, Tunisia =

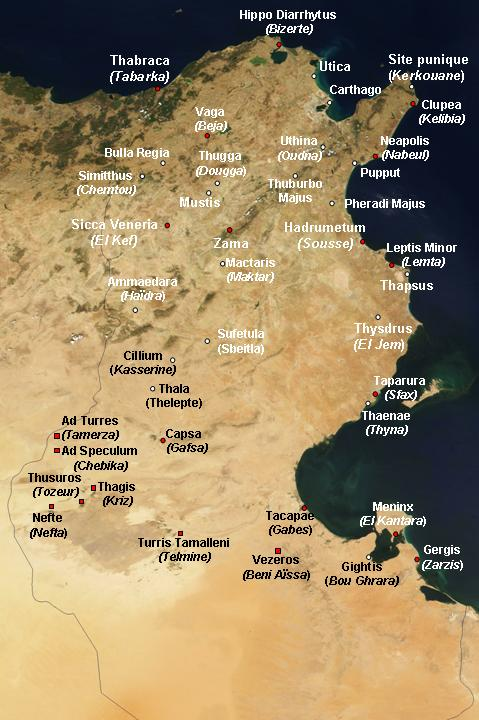
Map showing Mahjouba

Mahjouba, Tunisia is a place in the Sahel, Tunisia region of North Africa 54 km from Carthage. It is near Mateur and is the site of a fault line

== History ==
During the Byzantine and Roman Empires it was known as Tituli and was in the Roman province of Africa Proconsularis. The town was also the seat of an ancient Christian bishopric, which although ceasing to function with the Muslim conquest of the Maghreb, survives today as a titular see of the Roman Catholic Church.

== See also ==
- Mahjouba, Morocco
