= Nesma Mahgoub =

Egyptian singer (born 1989)

Nesma Mahgoub Mohamed
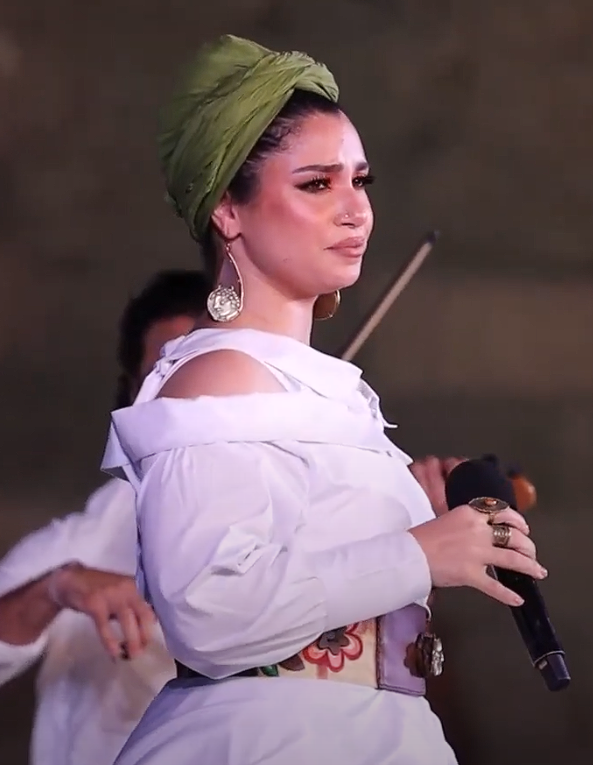
- Mahgoub in 2022

Background information
- Born: Nesma Alaa Eldin Ali Mahgoub نسمة علاء الدين علي محجوب; September 26, 1989 (age 36); Cairo, Egypt
- Genres: Egyptian music, pop, rock, funk, classical opera
- Occupations: Singer; actress
- Years active: 2011–present

Nesma Alaa Eldin Ali Mahgoub (Arabic: نسمة علاء الدين علي محجوب; born September 26, 1989) is an Egyptian singer and actress, who started her professional career after winning the 8th season of Star Academy – MENA in 2011.

== Study ==
Nesma Mahgoub finished her Abitur in the German School, DEO in 2008. During her school years, Mahgoub won several prizes in the German competition "Jugend Musiziert" in Egypt, Germany and many other European countries. She has always been a very special student of the famous Egyptian soprano, Dr. Neveen Allouba. She studied music in AUC and graduated with a Bachelor of musical arts majoring in Performance and minoring in Theater in 2013. She starred as the main role in many musicals done by The American University in Cairo, like Queen Dido in the famous opera, Dido & Aeneas by Henry Purcell, Lucy England in The Telephone (opera) by Gian Carlo Menotti and Eponine in the famous musical, Les Miserables (musical) by Claude-Michel Schönberg, which started off as her graduation project and grew into being a huge production produced by Dr. Neveen Allouba's musical theater company and academy, Fabrica. After graduation, she kept developing her Pop & Rock vocal capabilities by training with the CVT- (Complete Vocal Technique) authorized vocal coach, Sherif Al Dabaa. Mahgoub has always been fond of her academic side, so in 2017 she decided to take a big step by teaching in The American University in Cairo. She teaches voice and developed a new course to help singers on stage and teach them how to perform. She is also the conductor and director of the AUC Pop Ensemble, A caPop.

== Discography ==
=== Albums ===
- Hatolly Eh (2012) Label: MusicaPro
- Arouma (2021)
- Kefaya ft. Amir Hedayah (2021)
- Ya Ghawy Horoub (2021)

=== Singles ===
- Matkhalish Haga Twa'afak (2012)
- Hob Ekhwat (2015)
- Dawam Elhal Mohal (2015) El Donia Ma'louba movie
- Atliqi Sirraki -Let It Go (arabic)- (2013) Frozen dubbed movie
- Mestaghraba (2016)
- Wujuh (2016)
- Ya Mahrousa (2018) Al Kenz movie
- Elhob Elmostaheel (2018) Al Kenz movie
- Mashya Ma'ak (2018) Al Kenz movie
- Hobby Lik (2018) Layaly Eugenie Ramadan series
- Elhob (2019) Al Kenz 2 movie
- Elhob Naro Fil Oloub (2019) Al Kenz 2 movie
- Ezhary -Show Yourself (Arabic)- (2019) Frozen 2 dubbed movie
- Dawar Al Saada (2020)
- Kol Shams W Liha Del (2020)

== Dubbing ==
Nesma started dubbing cartoons with voicing Elsa in the Arabic dub of Disney's Frozen, performing "Atliqi Sirraki", the Arabic version of "Let It Go". After this movie's success, she voiced Queen Elsa in all Frozen-related movies and series by Disney ending with Frozen, as she continued voicing Elsa in Frozen II, performing "Ezhary", the Arabic version of "Show Yourself". Mahgoub also dubbed many other characters in Egyptian and American Animations, like Ice Age: Collision Course (also known as Ice Age 5)

== Theater ==
Nesma has been performing on stage since she was 10 years old. She considers it to be her second home where she feels most confident. After graduation, she was an active member of Fabrica for a few years. She continued to play Epoinine in Fabrica's Arabic version of Les Miserables (musical) and was cast as the gypsy in their version of El Leila El Kebira by Sayed Mekawy. In 2015, Mahgoub played the lead role of a new Arabic original musical, called "Donia Habibty", with the actor, Kamal Abu Raya. The musical showed her unique talent as a singer, actress and dancer and was directed by the famous director, Galal El Sharkawy.

== TV ==
Mahgoub recorded various songs for movies, series and ads. She has shown her musical skills in Sahibat Al Saada TV show, hosted by Essad Yunis, where she created and performed medleys of the most famous international songs from around the world and famous songs from the Middle East.
