= Studio 2M =

- Original languages: Arabic and French
- No. of series: 10

Original release
- Network: 2M TV
- Release: June 26, 2004 – May 18, 2013

Studio 2M (in Arabic 2M استوديو) is a Moroccan song competition on 2M TV television station for 10 consecutive years. It is equivalent to the French Star Academy. The first season started on 26 June 2004 and was presented that year by Imad Ntifi

The winners:

- 2004 (1st season): Abdelaziz (Oriental category), Joudia Belbkir (Occidental category)
- 2005 (2nd season): Laila Kouli, Hatim Ammor (Oriental category), Mona Roukachi (Occidental category)
- 2006 (3rd season): Imane Rabya (Public vote), Hasnaa Zalarh (Oriental category), Yassine Badrate (Occidental category)
- 2007 (4th season): Imane Karkibou (Public vote, Oriental category), Marouane El Bekri (Public vote, Occidental category), Leila El Berrak (Jury, Oriental category), Sabrine El Koulali (Jury, Occidental category).
- 2008 (5th season): Amine Riga (Public vote / Occidental category), Hajar Bensouda (Occidental), Sahar Seddiki (Jury)
- 2009 (6th season): Taoufik Bouchiti (Public vote), Meriem Chakroune (Jury, Oriental category), Zoubida Fennich and Sofia Mountassir (concurrently, Jury, Occidental category)
- 2010 (7th season): Tarek Farih (Public vote), Mohsine Salaheddine and Lamia Zaidi Tay (Oriental category), Amal El Bouchari (Occidental category)
- 2011 (8th season):Attawitah Zahra Stamos (concurrently, Jury, Occidental category)
- 2012 (9th season):Youssef Guelzim (Public vote), Wassila Khya (Public vote)
- 2013 (10th season): Mouhcine Rossadi (Public vote), Kawtar Sadik (Public vote)
