= Hisham Abdulrahman =

Saudi actor and TV Host

Hisham Abdulrahman هشام عبد الرحمن
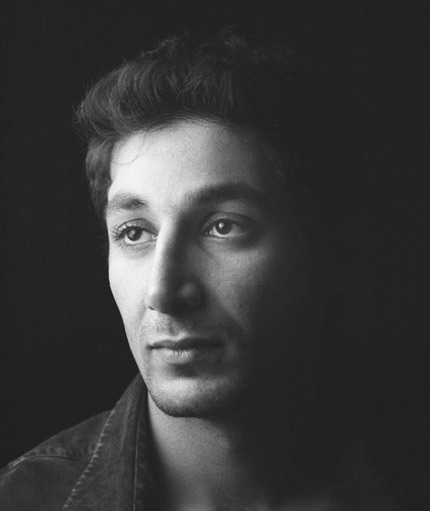

Background information
- Birth name: Hisham Abdulrahman Alhowaish هشام عبد الرحمن الهويش
- Born: March 7, 1980 (age 45); Jeddah, Saudi Arabia
- Genres: Arabic
- Occupation(s): TV host, actor
- Years active: 2005–present

Hisham Abdulrahman Alhowaish (Arabic: هشام عبد الرحمن الهويش) is a Saudi actor and TV host. He won the title of the second edition of the Arab version of Star Academy in 2005.

== Early life ==
Abdulrahman was born on 7 March 1980 in Jeddah, Saudi Arabia. He has eight sisters and seven brothers. He is married to the writer Nadin Aldouweghri and has two boys and one girl.

In 2006, he starred in Rotana's comedy-drama film Keif al-Hal?, Saudi Arabia's first big-budget film, produced by Ayman Halawani. Abdulrahman is also the presenter of the Middle East Broadcasting Center's show Cash Taxi, the Arab world version of Cash Cab.

== Filmography ==
Year	Title	Role	Notes
2005	Hisham on the line	Himself	TV show
2006	Keif al-hal	Sultan	TV movie
2006 - 2007	Cash Taxi	Himself	Season 1-2
2007	pimp my ride Arabic	Himself	Season 1
2007	For The Rest Of Your Life Arabic	Himself	TV show
2009	ALmojazfa	Himself	TV programme
2011	ALnklah	Himself	TV programme
2011	ALamel Cobra	Animated cartoon	Episode
2013-2014	You and your luck	Himself	Season 1-2
2014	The victorious Maradona	Himself	Season 1
2018 - 2019	Carpool Karaoke Arabic	Himself	Season 1-2
