= Mahjouba, Morocco =

Coordinates: 34°50′N 2°34′W

Mahjouba, Morocco is a town in Morocco, North Africa, located at 34°48'36"N and 2°34'48"W

The town was also the seat of an ancient Christian bishopric, which although ceasing to function with the Muslim conquest of the Maghreb, survives today as a titular see of the Roman Catholic Church.

== See also ==
- Mahjouba, Tunisia
