= Star Academy Arabia =

TV series or program

- Star Academy Arabia title card
- Also known as: Star Academy Arabia
- Created by: John de Mol
- Directed by: Primes: (Season 1): Christine Lanbier (Prime 1 To 2); Simon Asmar (Prime 3 To 18) (Season 2): Jean Louis Cap (Prime 1 To 3); Tristan Carné (Prime 4 And 8 And 12); Massimo Manganaro (Prime 5 And 7 And 10); Dider Froehly (Prime 6); Franck Broqua (Prime 9 And 13); Dider Fraisse (Prime 11); Tony Qahwaji (Prime 14 To 15) (Season 3 To 11): Tony Qahwaji; Dailies: (Season 1 To 5): Viviane Zaccour (Season 6): Nabil R. Asmar (Season 7 To 8): Micha Chahhoud (Season 9 To 11): Adib Mufty
- Presented by: Hilda Khalife
- Country of origin: Lebanon
- No. of seasons: 11

Production
- Producers: Roula Saad (2003–2011); Nadine Smayra (2013–2016)
- Production locations: Adma, Lebanon
- Camera setup: Multiple-camera setup
- Running time: Varies
- Production company: Endemol Middle East

Original release
- Network: LBCI (2003–2016); CBC (2013–2016)
- Release: 19 December 2003 – 29 January 2016

Star Academy Arab World or Star Academy Arabia, is an Arab world televised talent show, which aired from 19 December 2003, to 29 January 2016. The show features a group of young male and female candidates who are selected from a pan-Arab pool of more than 3,000 and sequestered for four months in "The Academy," a four-story building in Lebanon, where they live, train, and compete against one another every week. The show became an instant success and every episode a much-watched event across the Arab world.

The show was adapted from a French show of the same name and produced by Dutch company Endemol, Vanilla Productions & PAC Ltd. Star Academy Arab World is based on the Spanish format Operación Triunfo.

The show centers around the 16 candidates who compete in weekly talent competitions, singing, dancing, and acting during on-stage performances. At the end of every week, one contestant is kicked off by a public vote by the viewers.

One of the show's highlights are the guest appearances of some of the Arab world's most important singers and performers such as Najwa Karam, Angham, Haifa Wahbe, Assala Nasri, Ehab Tawfik, Elissa, Myriam Fares, Nawal Al-Zoghbi, Abdallah Al Rowaished, Wael Kfoury, Latifa, Carole Samaha, Sherine, Saad Lamjarred and many more. The show has also been successful for its reinvention and continuous changes, just as, starting from the third season, the show witnessed guests from international superstars such as Julio Iglesias, Anggun, Karl Wolf, Tina Arena and Chris De Burgh.

== Overview ==
Based in Adma, a city north of Beirut, Lebanon, the show is aired for 4 months on the Egyptian TV station CBC and on the Lebanese terrestrial channel LBC and is hosted by Hilda Khalife. The show follows 16 candidates through their weeks living in "The Academy," training with "teachers," and performing their talents in live on-stage shows. While many choose to sing, talents are not restricted to vocal performances; acting and dancing are also common talents.

The show takes on a few different formats depending on the day of the week. Every day, there is a one-hour "access" show that goes over the day's important and exciting events. On Friday, there is a live performance show where the candidates compete against each other, sometimes alongside famous domestic and international stars, and are voted off one by one. In addition, viewers can tune into "The Academy" 24/7 by watching LBC Reality, a dedicated satellite station.

The concept of the show is training the students in several disciplines: singing, acting, sports, vocalizing, theatre expression, dancing, and musical culture. Then, each Monday, the three weakest students are nominated. The nomination is done by the teaching staff after the candidates undergo an evaluation test the day before Sunday. On Friday, a special live show called "Prime" is broadcast. During the prime show, the candidates perform and sing either by themselves or with guest artists. The three nominated candidates' initial voting is through the public, done by either phone calls or text messages. The one with the highest percentage of votes returns. The two remaining candidates are then voted on by their fellow candidates, and the one with the most votes remains. The other candidate has to leave the academy immediately. When the overall number of candidates is reduced, the nomination by the professors comes down to two students. At this point, it's completely up to the public to vote who is in and who is out, as the remaining candidates do not vote.

The show proved to be immensely popular. As both the LBC and CBC stations provide satellite connections to more than two dozen Arab countries and also to Arab communities throughout the world, it became one of the most popular shows in the Arab-speaking world. In Saudi Arabia in particular, Star Academy was a media event so popular that its broadcasts achieved record ratings, emptied streets in major cities like Jedda, animated debates, inspired Mosque sermons, and widely distracted students from focusing on final exams in May 2004. (Al-Humaydan, 2005) CBC And LBCI, the networks airing the show, reaped huge profits from the show but have been unable to replicate the show's success with other reality shows.

This debate also caused the indefinite postponing of West Asian edition of Big Brother, also known as Big Brother – Al Raiss.

== Political responses ==
=== Conservatives ===
While the show is immensely popular among viewers, especially in Saudi Arabia, many conservative and religious leaders have criticized the show for promoting anti-Islamic behavior and ideals. Star Academy has sparked intense debates over the role of Islam in public life, Western cultural influence, gender relations, and political participation and has subverted Wahhabi notions of social order. In response to countless questions from religious Saudi viewers who questioned whether or not it was religiously haram (prohibited) or halal (permitted) to watch the show and participate in the voting component of Star Academy, the Permanent Committee for Scientific Research and the Issuing of Fatwas issued a related fatwa (religious ruling) that prohibited watching, discussing, voting in, or participating in Star Academy, as well as urging businessmen not to finance this or any similar show.

According to the Committee, the fatwa was issued because the show carried a number of serious issues including "free mixing of the sexes," "the wanton display and unveiling on the part of the women displaying their charms," and blatant promotion of immorality by "making Muslims get used to seeing these shameful scenes that provoke desires and by distancing them from good morals and virtues." The Committee also declared that simply not watching the show was not sufficient; it is also the duty of all practicing Muslims to advise those who watch or take part in the show that it is against religious law.

Many individuals have also spoken out against the show, citing religious reasoning as well. An Imam as Mecca’s Great Mosque called Star Academy a "weapon of mass destruction." Sahwi activists distributed a series of audiocassette sermons entitled "Satan Academy" while still others created similar sermons that compared the reality show to the virulent virus that had caused severe respiratory syndrome in the population. Religious leaders were not the only one to speak out against the show, though. Al-Riyah published a number of hostile op-eds entitled "Star Academy: A Corrupt Satellite Industry" and "Star Academy… The Other Terrorism" that harshly criticized the show.

=== Liberals ===
While there was much criticism of the show by the area’s more conservative members of society, many liberals praised the novel approach to television media. Numerous reporters in Saudi newspapers praised Star Academy as an alternative to the extremist dogma that had taken over mass media in the nation. In their view, the show acted as an invitation to dialogue as well as an inspiring lesson in democracy. In a column entitled "Star Academy’s Democracy" a female Saudi journalist wrote that "Arabs sheid away from voting because …[of fraud]… until satellite television… corrupted us by inciting us to vote: "vote you are the referee"…"nominate your favorite candidate"…the Arab viewer has become obsessed with voting because results resemble election results in the United States, where unlike Arab elected, no body wins by 99.9 percent but rather by logical proportions."

Other liberals were exasperated by the conservatives’ excessive reaction to Star Academy. Another female journalist writing for Arab news asked "how vulnerable must we be if a TV program can ‘destroy our moral standards and teach our children bad things."

A major liberal voice hailed from within the royal family when Prince Al-Waleed Bin Talal, a major stakeholder in LBC, supported Star Academy by sending his private plane to Beirut to bring the winner back to Saudi Arabia.

== The patriotic night ==
On 14 February 2005, Rula Sa'd, the Director of Marketing and Promotions at the LBC acted in her role as Director of the Academy to announce to the contestants that Rafiq al-Hariri had been assassinated, and that Lebanon was in mourning. This was one of the only instances in the show's history that a real-life event had intruded upon The Academy. Like other Lebanese channels, LBC suspended its regular programing to focus all attention on the aftermath of the assassination, including a ten-day hiatus of Star Academy. The show resumed on Friday, 25 February with an episode that critics named 'the patriotic night', during which the contestants, along with Arab celebrities and contestants from past seasons, came together and sang a number of patriotic songs in solidarity with the mourning nation. Not once throughout the program was al-Hariri's name said; instead, the show was made to be a demonstration of renewed patriotism.

Major controversy began when it came time to vote off that week's losing contestant. That week, the three nominees for expulsion included a Bahraini man Ahmad Salaheddin, a Syrian woman Joey Bassous, and a Lebanese man, Samer Doumit. Per contest rules, the public votes to save one contestant, and the remaining two are voted for by the other non nominated contestants. The Bahraini man was rescued by the public, but the Syrian women, despite getting higher ratings than Doumit by the public, was ultimately voted off the show.

The ousting was said to echo the tension that already existed between Syria and Lebanon post-assassination, as there was widespread suspicion that the Syrians were implicated in the crime.

== Winners ==
The winners for the various series were:

- Star Academy 1 (2003–2004): (Egypt) Mohamed Attieh
- Star Academy 2 (2004–2005): (Saudi Arabia) Hisham Abdulrahman
- Star Academy 3 (2005–2006): (Lebanon) Joseph Attieh
- Star Academy 4 (2006–2007): (Iraq) Shatha Hassoun
- Star Academy 5 (2008): (Tunisia) Nader Guirat
- Star Academy 6 (2009): (Saudi Arabia) Abdulaziz Abdulrahman
- Star Academy 7 (2010): (Syria) Nassif Zeitoun
- Star Academy 8 (2011): (Egypt) Nesma Mahgoub
- Star Academy 9 (2013–2014): (Egypt) Mahmoud Mohy
- Star Academy 10 (2014): (Egypt) Mohamed Chahine
- Star Academy 11 (2015–2016): (Lebanon) Marwan Youssef

== Teachers ==
- Academy Director:Roula Saad (Seasons 1 to 8) / Claudia Marchelian (Seasons 9 to 11)
- Contestant Supervisor: Fouad Fadel (Seasons 3 to 8)
- Voice Instructor: Wadih Abi Raad (Seasons 1 to 8)/ Khalil Abu Obeid (Seasons 7 to 9)/ Hicham Boulos (Season 9 Only)/ Carla Ramia (Seasons 10 to 11)
- Music Instructor: Michel Fadel (Seasons 1 to 8)/ Amir Theyma (Seasons 10 to 11)
- Vocalize Instructor: Mary Mahfoud (Seasons 1 to 2 then 4 to 11)/ Pierre Samia (Season 3 Only)
- Dance Instructor: Alissar Caracalla (Seasons 1 to 9)/ Hadi Awada (Seasons 10 to 11)
- Drama Instructor: Betty Taoutel (Seasons 1 to 2 then 9 to 11)/ Aida Sabra (Seasons 1 to 2) / Gabriel Yammine (Seasons 3 to 5)/ Michel Jaber (Seasons 6 to 7)/ Naji Sorati (Season 8 Only)
- Fitness Instructor: George Assaf (Seasons 1 to 2 then 5 to 8)/ Wael Jaber (Seasons 3 to 4)

== Seasons ==
=== Star Academy 1 ===
The first season of Star Academy 1 made its debut in early December 2003. The first season ended on 4 April 2004. The winner was the Egyptian candidate, Mohammad Attia.

The inaugural show quickly became popular and tickets for the show became harder to get as the show went on. The students, particularly the Top 8, became household names, and those that made the Top 8 became instant stars. The eight finalists were Mohammad Attia (Egypt), Bashar Al Shatty (Kuwait), Sophia El Mareekh (Morocco), Bahaa' El Kafy (Tunisia), Ahmed El Sherif (Tunisia), Myriam Attallah (Syria), Mohammad Khalawi (Saudi Arabia) and Cynthya Karam (Lebanon). The teachers were as follows: Wadih Abi Raad, Michael Fadel, Mary Mahfouth, Betty Taoutel, Aida Sabra, Elissar Karakalla and Rola Saad. At the end of the show, an album featuring the Top 8 was released, as well as a music video for the winner. They then went on a Pan Arab tour, performing concerts in Dubai, Kuwait, Cairo, Alexandria, Amman, Damascus, and Beirut.

Many of them released albums, ranging in various degrees of success. Bashar Al Shatty (Kuwait) has gained much success in his three albums which he released over the last five years. Also being crowned as the most successful teenage singer in the Persian Gulf region was added to his success of being the Star Academy finalist. However, the most successful was Ahmed El Sherif (Tunisia), despite coming in the 5th place. His album has been the most successful among all student from Star Academy.

- Mohammad Attia (Winner; released one album)
- Bashar Al Shatti (Finalist; released three albums)
- Bahaa' El Kafy (3rd place; released one album)
- Mohammad Khalawi (4th place; released one album)
- Ahmed El Sherif (5th place; released two albums)
- Sophia El Mareekh (6th place; released one album)
- Cynthya Karam (7th place; no albums released)
- Myriam Attallah (8th place; released multiple songs & albums)

The candidate that took the 9th place, Bruno Tabbal, participated in the "World Best" contest that englobed about 11 countries that have this reality show in their country. He took the 10th place, and the French person, Elodie Frégé, won.

Primes

Prime:	26/12/03 Prime 4	02/01/04 Prime 5	09/01/04 Prime 6	16/01/04 Prime 7	23/01/04 Prime 8	30/01/04 Prime 9	06/02/04 Prime 10	13/02/04 Prime 11	20/02/04 Prime 12	27/02/04 Prime 13	05/03/04 Prime 14	12/03/04 Prime 15	19/03/04 Prime 16	26/03/04 prime 17	03/04/04 prime 18
Public's vote :	Nesrine; 33% Yasser; 24% Soumaya; 43%	Amine; 54% Yasser; 13% Youssef; 33%	Mira; 47% Yasser; 15% Soumaya; 38%	Ahmad; 63% Mira; 16% Amine; 21%	Soumaya; 46% Leila; 28% Mira; 26%	Sophia; 48% Bruno; 28% Soumaya; 24%	Mohamaed A 56% Bruno; 28% Mira; 16%	Ahmad; 50% Sophia; 31% Bruno; 19%	Sophia; 51.3% Myriam; 48.7%	Mohamad K 71.6% Cynthya; 28.4%	Bashar; 78.2% Sophia; 21.8%	Mohamad K 55.4% Ahmad; 44.6%	Bashar; 57.9% Mohamad K 42.1%	Mohamad A 51.1% Bahaa; 48.9%	Mohamad A 55.1% Bashar; 44.9%
Evicted :	Nisrine; 5/11 votes	Youssef; 6/12 votes^{2}	Yasser; 3/11 votes	Amine; 4/10 votes	Leila; 4/9 votes	Soumaya; 4/8 votes^{3}	Mira; 3/7 votes	Bruno; 2/6 votes	Myriam; Public's vote	Cynthya; Public's vote	Sofia; Public's vote	Ahmad; Public's vote	Mohamad K Public's vote	Bahaa; Public's vote	
	Contestants' votes								Public's vote						
Mohamad Attiah (Egypt)	Yasser	Youssef	Yasser	Amine	Mira	Bruno	Saved by public	Sophia	Saved	Saved	Saved	Saved	Saved	Saved by public	Winner
Bashar Al-Shatty (Kuwait)	Yasser	Youssef	Soumaya	Amine	Leila	Bruno	Mira	Sophia	Saved	Saved	Saved by public	Saved	Saved by public	Saved	2nd Place
Bahaa Al-Kafi (Tunisia)	Nisrine	Yasser	Soumaya	Mira	Mira	Soumaya	Mira	Sophia	Saved	Saved	Saved	Saved	Saved	Evicted	3rd Place
Mohammed Khalawi (Saudi Arabia)	Yasser	Youssef	Yasser	Amine	Mira	Soumaya	Mira	Sophia	Saved	Saved by public	Saved	Saved by public	Evicted	4th Place	
Ahmad Cherif (Tunisia)	Yasser	Youssef	Soumaya	Saved by public	Mira	Soumaya	Bruno	Saved by public	Saved	Saved	Saved	Evicted	5th Place		
Sophia Marikh (Morocco)	None	Yasser	Soumaya	Amine	Mira	Saved by public	Bruno	Saved by colleagues	Saved by public	Saved	Evicted	6th Place			
Cynthya Karam (Lebanon)	None	Yasser	Soumaya	Mira	Leila	Bruno	Bruno	Bruno	Saved	Evicted	7th Place				
Myriam Atallah (Syria)	Nisrine	Yasser	Soumaya	Mira	Leila	Soumaya	Bruno	Bruno	Evicted	8th Place					
Bruno Tabal (Lebanon)	Nisrine	Youssef	Soumaya	Mira	Leila	Saved by colleagues	Saved by colleagues	Evicted	9th Place						
Mira Mikhail^{1} (Lebanon)	Nisrine	Yasser	Saved by public	Saved by colleagues	Saved by colleagues	Bruno	Evicted	10th Place							
Soumaya El Jouini (Tunisia)	Saved by Public	Yasser	Saved by colleagues	Mira	Saved by public	Evicted	11th Place								
Leila Iskandar (Lebanon)	Nisrine	Youssef	Soumaya	Mira	Evicted	12th Place									
Amine Errachidi (Morocco)	Yasser	Saved by public	Yasser	Evicted	13th Place										
Yasser Abdelmnaem (Egypt)	Saved by colleagues	Saved by colleagues	Evicted	14th Place											
Youssef Kazem (United Arab Emirates)	Yasser	Evicted	15th Place												
Nisrine Jobran (Lebanon)	Evicted	16th Place													

^Note 1.1: One week after the beginning of the program, She was chosen to participate in the program because of the withdrawal of the Syrian candidate Wafaa Nader due to some pregnancy problems.
^Note 1.2: As there was a tie, Amine had the casting vote and he saved Yasser.
^Note 1.3: As there was a tie, Sophia had the casting vote and she saved Bruno.

Tour

Mohamad A, Bashar, Bahaa, Ahmad, Mohamad K, Sophia, Cynthyia, and Myriam (the Top 8) were chosen to be part of the tour.

=== Star Academy 2 ===
Hisham Abdulrahman, from Saudi Arabia, was declared as the winner this year, even though he was not the critic's favorite. He is also the winner with the most nominations in the show's history, with a record 4 nominations. Most felt that Amani El Swissi or Zizi Adel were the better performers overall. Many also felt that this year was a step-down in the quality of students from the previous year, with only Amani El Swissi, Zizi Adel, and Ahmed Hussein being deemed good singers.

Primes

Prime:	07/01/05 Prime 2	14/01/05 Prime 3	21/01/05 Prime 4	28/01/05 Prime 5	04/02/05 Prime 6	11/02/05 prime 7	25/02/05 Prime 8	04/03/05 Prime 9	11/03/05 Prime 10	18/03/05 Prime 11	26/03/05 Prime 12	01/04/05 Prime 13	08/04/05 prime 14	15/04/05 Prime 15
Public's vote :	Anas El Ramley; 54.16% Randa Hafez; 27.13% Imane Mehzer; 18.71%	Anas El Ramley; 59.90% Hanane El Asafara; 23.52% Imane Mehzer; 16.58%	Fahed El Zaed; 40.28% Bashar El Qaisi; 36.35% Anas El Ramley; 23.37%	Salma Ghazali; 72.81% Katia Harake; 16.84% Imane Mehzer; 10.35%	Ahmad Salah El Din; 35.71% Bashar El Qaisi; 33.53% Fahed El Zaed; 30.76%	Hisham Abdulrahman; 76.87% Ahmad Salah El Din; 12.88% Fahed El Zaed; 10.25%	Ahmad Salah El Din; 34.92% Joy Bassous; 33.02% Samer Doumit; 32.06%	Ahmad Hussein; 72.92% Ahmad Salah El Din; 15.74% Samer Doumit; 11.34%	Bashar Ghazawi; 55.33% Salma Ghazali; 44.67%	Bashar Ghazawi; 53.10% Samer Doumit; 46.90%	Katia Harake; 6.70% Bashar Ghazawi; 8.26% Hisham Abdulrahman; 85.04%	Ahmad Hussein; 32.45% Hisham Abdulrahman; 67.55%	Hisham Abdulrahman; 58.35% Zizi Adel; 41.65%	Hisham Abdulrahman; 51.84% Amani El Swissi; 48.16%
Evicted :	Randa Hafez; 3/13 votes	Hanane El Asafara; 3/12 votes	Anas El Ramley; 4/11 votes	Imane Mehzer; 2/10 votes	Bashar El Qaisi; 4/9 votes	Fahed El Zaed; 2/8 votes	Joy Bassous; 1/7 votes	Ahmad Salah El Din; 2/6 votes	Salma Ghazali; Public's vote	Samer Doumit; Public's vote	Bashar Ghazawi; Katia Harake; Public's vote	Ahmad Hussein; Public's vote	Zizi Adel; Public's vote	
	Contestants' votes								Public's vote					
Hisham Abdulrahman (Saudi Arabia)	Imane Mehzer	Imane Mehzer	Anas El Ramley	Katia Harake	Fahed El Zaed	Saved by public	Samer Doumit	Ahmad Salah El Din	Saved	Saved	Saved by public	Saved by public	Saved by public	Winner
Amani El Swissi (Tunisia)	Imane Mehzer	Hanane El Asafara	Anas El Ramley	Imane Mehzer	Bashar El Qaisi	Ahmad Salah El Din	Samer Doumit	Samer Doumit	Saved	Saved	Saved	Saved	Saved	2nd Place
Zizi Adel (Egypt)	Randa Hafez	Hanane El Asafara	Bashar El Qaisi	Katia Harake	Fahed El Zaed	Fahed El Zaed	Samer Doumit	Ahmad Salah El Din	Saved	Saved	Saved	Saved	Evicted	3rd Place
Ahmad Hussein (Kuwait)	Imane Mehzer	Hanane El Asafara	Anas El Ramley	Katia Harake	Fahed El Zaed	Ahmad Salah El Din	Joy Bassous	Saved by public	Saved	Saved	Saved	Evicted	4th Place	
Bashar Ghazawi (Jordan)	Imane Mehzer	Imane Mehzer	Bashar El Qaisi	Katia Harake	Fahed El Zaed	Ahmad Salah El Din	Samer Doumit	Samer Doumit	Saved by public	Saved by public	Evicted	5th Place		
Katia Harake (Lebanon)	Imane Mehzer	Imane Mehzer	Bashar El Qaisi	Saved by colleagues	Bashar El Qaisi	Ahmad Salah El Din	Samer Doumit	Samer Doumit	Saved	Saved	Evicted	6th Place		
Samer Doumit (Lebanon)	Imane Mehzer	Imane Mehzer	Bashar El Qaisi	Katia Harake	Fahed El Zaed	Fahed El Zaed	Saved by colleagues	Saved by colleagues	Saved	Evicted	7th Place			
Salma Ghazali (Algeria)	Imane Mehzer	Imane Mehzer	Anas El Ramley	Saved by public	Bashar El Qaisi	Ahmad Salah El Din	Samer Doumit	Samer Doumit	Evicted	8th Place				
Ahmad Salah El Din (Bahrain)	Imane Mehzer	Imane Mehzer	Bashar El Qaisi	Katia Harake	Saved by public	Saved by colleagues	Saved by public	Evicted	9th Place					
Joy Bassous (Syria)	Imane Mehzer	Imane Mehzer	Bashar El Qaisi	Imane Mehzer	Bashar El Qaisi	Ahmad Salah El Din	Evicted	10th Place						
Fahed El Zaed (Kuwait)	Randa Hafez	Imane Mehzer	Saved by public	Katia Harake	Saved by colleagues	Evicted	11th Place							
Bashar El Qaisi (Iraq)	Imane Mehzer	Imane Mehzer	Saved by colleagues	Katia Harake	Evicted	12th Place								
Imane Mehzer (Lebanon)	Saved by colleagues	Saved by colleagues	Bashar El Qaisi	Evicted	13th Place									
Anas El Ramley (Libya)	Saved by public	Saved by public	Evicted	14th Place										
Hanane El Asafara (Morocco)	Randa Hafez	Evicted	15th Place											
Randa Hafez (Egypt)	Evicted	16th Place												

Tour

Hisham, Amani, Zizi, Ahmad H, Bashar G, Katia, Samer, and Salma (once again, the Top 8) were chosen to be part of the tour.

=== Star Academy 3 ===
Joseph Attieh, who is a radio and TV production student received a trophy, $50,000 in cash and a brand new 2006 car. He was 19 years old and the first Lebanese to win the Title. This year was seen as an improvement over the previous year, and a return to the level of the first season, with many talented students. Some like Hani, Hanaa, and Shayma were deemed just as worthy of winning as Joseph. There were also many other strong performers like Fadi, Khalifa, Rakiya, Maya, and Wajdi.

This year, the show expanded the number of students from 16 contestants, in the two previous years, to 19 students.

Primes

Prime:	30/12/05 Prime 2	06/01/06 Prime 3	13/01/06 Prime 4	20/01/06 Prime 5	27/01/06 Prime 6	03/02/06 Prime 7	10/02/06 Prime 8	17/02/06 Prime 9	24/02/06 Prime 10	03/03/06 Prime 11	10/03/06 Prime 12	17/03/06 Prime 13	24/03/06 Prime 14	31/03/06 prime 15	07/04/06 Prime 16
Public's vote :	Rym; 55.56% Jihane; 25.76% Fady; 18.68%	Mohamad; 42.38% Chadia; 31.61% Manale; 26.01%	Mohammad; 44.94% Mohamed; 43.38% Manale; 11.68%	Rym; 41.56% Mohamed; 35.69% Walid; 22.75%	Wajdi; 62.04% Marwa; 22.88% Issa; 15.08%	Rym; 36.86% Issa; 33.43% Mohammad; 29.71%	Rym; 44.72% Wajdi; 40.00% Mohamad; 15.28%	Chayma; 35.82% Mohamad; 34.23% Mohammad; 29.95%	Rym; 36.12% Rakiya; 34.25% Maya; 29.63%	Khalifa; 44.89% Mohammad; 29.86% Maya; 25.25%	Chayma; 53.78% Rym; 46.22%	Khalifa; 50.47% Maya; 49.53%	Fady; 67.08% Khalifa; 32.92%	Hani; 50.34% Chayma; 39.86% Fady; 9.80%	Joseph; 55.15% Hani; 29.20% Hanaa; 15.65%
Evicted :	Jihane; 7/16 votes	Chadia; 2/15 votes	Manale; 7/14 votes^{1}	Mohamed; 3/13 votes	Marwa; 4/11 votes	Issa; 5/10 votes^{2}	Wajdi; 4/9 votes	Mohamad; 4/8 votes^{3}	Rakiya; 3/7 votes	Mohammad; 0/6 votes	Rym; Public's vote	Maya; Public's vote	Khalifa; Public's vote	Chayma; Fady; Public's vote	
	Contestants' votes										Public's vote				
Joseph Attieh (Lebanon)	Fady	Manale	Manale	Walid	Issa	Mohammad	Wajdi	Mohammad	Maya	Maya	Saved	Saved	Saved	Saved	Winner
Hani Hussein (Egypt)	Fady	Manale	Manale	Walid	Marwa	Mohammad	Mohamad	Mohamad	Rakiya	Maya	Saved	Saved	Saved	Saved by public	2nd Place^{5}
Hanaa El Idrissi (Morocco)	Jihane	Chadia	Manale	Walid	Issa	Mohammad	Wajdi	Mohamad	Maya	Maya	Saved	Saved	Saved	Saved	3rd Place
Chayma Helali (Tunisia)	Fady	Manale	Mohamed	Walid	Issa	Issa	Wajdi	Saved by public	Maya	Maya	Saved by public	Saved	Saved	Evicted	4th Place
Fady Andraos (Palestine)	Saved by colleagues	Manale	Manale	Walid	Marwa	Issa	Mohamad	Mohammad	Maya	Maya	Saved	Saved	Saved by public	Evicted	5th Place
Khalifa Salem (United Arab Emirates)	Fady	Manale	Mohamed	Mohamed	Issa	Mohammad	Mohamad	Mohammad	Rakiya	Saved by public	Saved	Saved by public	Evicted	6th Place	
Maya Nehme (Lebanon)	Fady	Manale	Manale	Walid	Marwa	Issa	Wajdi	Mohamad	Saved by colleagues	Saved by colleagues	Saved	Evicted	7th Place		
Rym Ghazali (Algeria)	Saved by public	Manale	Mohamed	Saved by public	Issa	Saved by public	Saved by public	Mohammad	Saved by public	Maya	Evicted	8th Place			
Mohammad Ibrahim (Kuwait)	Jihane	Manale	Saved by public	Mohamed	Issa	Saved by colleagues	Mohamad	Saved by colleagues	Rakiya	Evicted	9th Place				
Rakiya Yehia (Egypt)	Jihane	Chadia	Manale	Walid	Marwa	Mohammad	Mohamad	Mohamad	Evicted	10th Place					
Mohamad Fahad (Saudi Arabia)	Jihane	Saved by public	Mohamed	Walid	Issa	Issa	Saved by colleagues	Evicted	11th Place						
Wajdi Lakhal (Tunisia)	Fady	Manale	Manale	Walid	Saved by public	Issa	Evicted	12th Place							
Issa El Hassan (Bahrain)	Jihane	Manale	Mohamed	Mohamed	Saved by colleagues	Evicted	13th Place								
Marwa Nasr (Egypt)	Jihane	Manale	Mohamed	Walid	Evicted	14th Place									
Walid Samara (Jordan)	Fady	Manale	Mohamed	Saved by colleagues	Dropped Out After Prime 5	15th Place^{4}									
Mohamed Dossary (Saudi Arabia)	Fady	Manale	Saved by colleagues	Evicted	16th Place										
Manale Tahan (Lebanon)	Fady	Saved by colleagues	Evicted	17th Place											
Chadia El Samlali (Morocco)	Jihane	Evicted	18th Place												
Jihane Khamas (Morocco)	Evicted	19th Place													

^Note 3.1: As there was a tie, Mohammad Ibrahim had the casting vote and he saved Mohamed Dossary
^Note 3.2: As there was a tie, Rym had the casting vote and she saved Mohammad Ibrahim
^Note 3.3: As there was a tie, Chayma had the casting vote and she saved Mohammad Ibrahim
^Note 3.4: He withdrew from the academy after being nominated and saved by his colleagues vote and not by the public's vote

Tour

Joseph, Hani, Hanaa, Chayma, Fady, Khalifa, Maya, Rakiya and Wajdi were chosen to be part of the tour. This was the first year 9 students instead of 8 went on tour. It was also the first time where the Top finishing students did not all go on tour. Despite finishing 8th and 9th, Rym and Mohammed I were not chosen for the tour, Rakiya and Wajdi were selected to go on tour instead.

=== Star Academy 4 ===
Shada Hassoun, from Iraq, made history by being the first girl to take the title.

The fourth season (2007) was also the first season where two girls claimed the first and second place when Shada Hassoun came in first, and Marwa (from Tunisia) came in second. It was also noteworthy to feature the first female contestant from the Persian Gulf, Shoroq (from Bahrain), as well as the first contestant from Oman, Ayoub.

Primes

Prime:	22/12/06 Prime 2	29/12/06 Prime 3	04/01/07 Prime 4	11/01/07 Prime 5	19/01/07 Prime 6	26/01/07 Prime 7	02/02/07 Prime 8	09/02/07 Prime 9	16/02/07 Prime 10	23/02/07 Prime 11	02/03/07 Prime 12	09/03/07 Prime 13	16/03/07 Prime 14	23/03/07 prime 15	30/03/07 prime 16
Public's vote :	Maisoun; 42.18% Khaled; 35.29% Nelly; 22.53%	Maisoun; 35.08% Nelly; 33.65% Intissar; 31.27%	Shoroq; 45.97% Maisoun; 42.93% Nelly; 11.10%	Abdul Aziz; 64.25% Dany; 28.89% Nelly; 6.86%	Ali; 57.71% Imane; 23.37% Shoroq; 18.92%	Sally; 54.17% Imane; 23.89% Dany; 21.94%	Ali; 56.51% Abdul Aziz; 34.26% Dany; 9.23%	Ahmad; 44.34% Abdul Aziz; 33.58% Ayoub; 22.08%	Sally; 43.72% Imed; 35.30% Ayoub; 20.98%	Ahmad; 36.14% Amel; 33.24% Imed; 30.62%	Ali; 37.35% Sally; 37.18% Amel; 25.47%	Ali; 42.83% Sally; 30.86% Ahmad; 26.31%	Mohamed; 55.61% Ali; 35.65% Tina; 8.74%	Shatha; 54.08% Sally; 45.92%	Shatha; 40.63% Marwa; 28.65% Mohamed; 25.06% Carlo; 5.66%
Evicted :	Khaled; 7/16 votes	Intissar; 7/15 votes	Maisoun; 6/14 votes	Nelly; 3/13 votes	Shoroq; 3/12 votes	Imane; 4/11 votes	Dany; 3/10 votes	Abdul Aziz; 4/9 votes	Ayoub; 3/8 votes	Imed; 3/7 votes	Amel; 3/6 votes^{1}	Ahmad; 2/5 votes	Ali; Tina; Public's vote	Sally; Public's vote	
	Contestants' votes												Public's votes		
Shada Hassoun (Iraq)	Nelly	Intissar	Nelly	Nelly	Imane	Imane	Abdul Aziz	Ayoub	Ayoub	Amel	Amel	Ahmad	Saved	Saved by public	Winner
Marwa Bin Sughaier (Tunisia)	Nelly	Intissar	Nelly	Dany	Imane	Imane	Abdul Aziz	Ayoub	Imed	Imed	Amel	Ahmad	Saved	Saved	2nd Place
Mohamed Kammah (Egypt)	Khaled	Nelly	Maisoun	Dany	Imane	Dany	Abdul Aziz	Ayoub	Imed	Imed	Sally	Sally	Saved by public	Saved	3rd Place
Carlo Nekhle (Lebanon)	Nelly	Nelly	Nelly	Dany	Imane	Dany	Dany	Abdul Aziz	Imed	Imed	Sally	Sally	Saved	Saved	4th Place
Sally Ahmed (Egypt)	Nelly	Intissar	Maisoun	Dany	Imane	Saved by public	Dany	Abdul Aziz	Saved by public	Amel	Saved by colleagues	Saved by colleagues	Saved	Evicted	5th Place
Ali El Saad (Saudi Arabia)	Khaled	Nelly	Maisoun	Dany	Saved by public	Dany	Saved by public	Abdul Aziz	Ayoub	Amel	Saved by public	Saved by public	Evicted	6th Place	
Tina Yamout (Lebanon)	Nelly	Nelly	Nelly	Nelly	Imane	Dany	Dany	Ayoub	Imed	Amel	Sally	Sally	Evicted	7th Place	
Ahmad Dawood (Kuwait)	Khaled	Intissar	Nelly	Dany	Shoroq	Dany	Abdul Aziz	Saved by public	Ayoub	Saved by public	Amel	Evicted	8th Place		
Amel El Anbari (Morocco)	Nelly	Intissar	Maisoun	Dany	Imane	Imane	Abdul Aziz	Ayoub	Imed	Saved by colleagues	Evicted	9th Place			
Imed Jallouli (Tunisia)	Khaled	Intissar	Maisoun	Dany	Imane	Imane	Abdul Aziz	Abdul Aziz	Saved by colleagues	Evicted	10th Place				
Ayoub El Zadjali (Oman)	Khaled	Nelly	Nelly	Nelly	Shoroq	Dany	Abdul Aziz	Saved by colleagues	Evicted	11th Place					
Abdul Aziz El Aswad (Kuwait)	Khaled	Nelly	Nelly	Saved by public	Shoroq	Dany	Saved by colleagues	Evicted	12th Place						
Dany Shamoun (Lebanon)	Nelly	Nelly	Nelly	Saved by colleagues	Imane	Saved by colleagues	Evicted	13th Place							
Imane Elmelbi (Morocco)	Nelly	Intissar	Maisoun	Dany	Saved by colleagues'	Evicted	14th Place								
Shoroq Ahmad (Bahrain)	Khaled	Nelly	Saved by public	Dany	Evicted	15th Place									
Nelly Maatouk (Lebanon)	Saved by colleagues	Saved by colleagues	Saved by colleagues	Evicted	16th Place										
Maisoun Sedky (Egypt)	Saved by public	Saved by public	Evicted	17th Place											
Intissar Al-Azhar (Tunisia)	Nelly	Evicted	18th Place												
Khaled El Ferdan (Bahrain)	Evicted	19th Place													

^Note 4.1: As there was a tie, Ali had the casting vote and he saved Sally

Tour

Shada, Marwa, Mohamed, Carlo, Sally, Ali, Tina, Ahmad, and Imed were chosen to be part of the tour. Once again, 9 students were chosen for the tour. even though Amel was placed ahead of Imed, he was chosen to go on tour instead of her.

=== Star Academy 5 ===
The fifth season of Star Academy began on 25 January 2008. There were several changes in the academy that included a new swimming pool, a basketball court, a trampoline, a pool and tennis table and a newly decorated building. New lessons were added this season including swimming lessons, basketball lessons and music lessons. Another change was the increase in the number of students, from 19 in the previous season to now 20.

The final prime of Star Academy 5 held on 23 May 2008, witnessed the crowning of Nader Guirat, the first winner from Tunis and the Maghreb region.

His victory was somewhat controversial, as Nader Guirat was the first winner of the program to sing primarily in non-Arabic languages (English, French, etc.). Even though he did sing in Arabic on rare occasions, many felt that his Arabic singing was nowhere near up to the standards of the other contestants, and not worthy of a variety show that is primarily in Arabic. Nader is also the first winner to be a nominee without being saved by the public, as he had received a low percentage of votes.

Primes

Prime:	01/02/08 Prime 2	08/02/08 Prime 3	15/02/08 Prime 4	22/02/08 Prime 5	29/02/08 Prime 6	07/03/08 Prime 7	14/03/08 Prime 8	21/03/08 Prime 9	28/03/08 Prime 10	04/04/08 Prime 11	11/04/08 Prime 12	18/04/08 Prime 13	25/04/08 Prime 14	02/05/08 Prime 15	09/05/08 Prime 16	16/05/08 prime 17	23/05/08 prime 18
Public's vote :	Ahmad; 51.25% Omar; 39.73% Jessica; 9.02%	Khaled; 56.23% Iman; 26.98% Jessica; 16.79%	Zaher; 67.91% Khaled; 23.12% Fawaz; 8.97%	Badr; 35.95% Ahmad; 34.86% Khaled; 29.19%	Asma; 55.31% Amal M 29.66% Iman; 15.03%	Adnan; 37.47% Dia; 32.99% Khaled; 29.54%	Amel B 61.60% Asma; 20.28% Zaher; 18.12%	Badr; 38.02% Zaher; 33.05% Adnan; 28.93%	Mirhan; 40.41% Mustafa; 35.50% Amal M 24.09%	Dia; 71.32% Badr; 20.07% Amal M 8.61%	Amel B 48.82% Dia; 44.48% Amal M 6.70%	Dia; 53.10% Amel B 39.96% Zaher; 6.94%	Dia; 61.05% Nader; 31.96% Zaher; 6.99%	Mirhan; 53.15% Dia; 46.85%	Abdallah; 75.46% Mirhan; 24.54%	Mohamad; 73.91% Shahinaz; 26.09%	Nader; 34.44% Mohamad; 34.04% Saad; 31.52%
Evicted :	Omar; 7/17 votes	Jessica; 6/16 votes	Fawaz; 7/15 votes	Ahmad; 7/14 votes^{1}	Iman; 5/13 votes	Khaled; 3/12 votes	Asma; 5/11 votes	Adnan; 4/10 votes	Mustafa; 3/9 votes	Badr; 4/8 votes^{2}	Amal M 3/7 votes	Amel B 2/6 votes	Zaher; 2/5 votes	Dia; Public's vote	Mirhan; Public's vote	Shahinaz; Public's vote	
	Contestants' vote													Public's vote			
Nader Guirat (Tunisia)	Omar	Iman	Khaled	Ahmad	Amal M	Dia	Zaher	Zaher	Amal M	Amal M	Amal M	Amel B	Saved by colleagues	Saved	Saved	Saved	Winner
Mohamad Qwaider (Jordan)	Omar	Iman	Fawaz	Khaled	Iman	Khaled	Zaher	Zaher	Amal M	Badr	Amal M	Zaher	Zaher	Saved	Saved	Saved by public	2nd Place
Saad Ramadan (Lebanon)	Jessica	Jessica	Fawaz	Khaled	Amal M	Dia	Asma	Adnan	Mustafa	Badr	Dia	Zaher	Zaher	Saved	Saved	Saved	3rd Place
Shahinaz Dia El Din (Egypt)	Omar	Iman	Khaled	Ahmad	Iman	Dia	Zaher	Zaher	Amal M	Amal M	Dia	Zaher	Nader	Saved	Saved	Evicted	4th Place
Abdallah El Dossari (Saudi Arabia)	Jessica	Iman	Fawaz	Khaled	Iman	Khaled	Asma	Adnan	Mustafa	Badr	Dia	Zaher	Nader	Saved	Saved by public	Dropped Out Right After Prime 16	5th Place^{3}
Mirhan Hussein (Egypt)	Omar	Jessica	Fawaz	Ahmad	Amal M	Dia	Zaher	Zaher	Saved by public	Amal M	Dia	Amel B	Nader	Saved by public	Evicted	6th Place	
Dia El Tayebi (Morocco)	Jessica	Jessica	Khaled	Ahmad	Amal M	Saved by colleagues	Asma	Adnan	Amal M	Saved by public	Saved by colleagues	Saved by public	Saved by public	Evicted	7th Place		
Zaher El Saleh (Palestine)	Jessica	Jessica	Saved by public	Khaled	Amal M	Dia	Saved by colleagues	Saved by colleagues	Amal M	Badr	Amal M	Saved by colleagues	Evicted	8th Place			
Amel Boshousha (Algeria)	Jessica	Iman	Khaled	Khaled	Amal M	Dia	Saved by public	Zaher	Amal M	Amal M	Saved by public	Evicted	9th Place				
Amal Mahalawi (Tunisia)	Jessica	Iman	Fawaz	Ahmad	Saved by colleagues	Dia	Asma	Zaher	Saved by colleagues	Saved by colleagues	Evicted	10th Place					
Badr Mansour (Saudi Arabia)	Omar	Iman	Fawaz	Saved by public	Iman	Khaled	Zaher	Saved by public	Mustafa	Evicted	11th Place						
Mustafa Mezher (Lebanon)	Jessica	Jessica	Khaled	Ahmad	Amal M	Dia	Zaher	Adnan	Evicted	12th Place							
Adnan El Kari (Syria)	Jessica	Iman	Khaled	Khaled	Amal M	Saved by public	Asma	Evicted	13th Place								
Asma Bassit (Morocco)	Jessica	Iman	Fawaz	Ahmad	Saved by public	Dia	Evicted	14th Place									
Khaled Bosakher (Kuwait)	Omar	Saved by public	Saved by colleagues	Saved by colleagues	Iman	Evicted	15th Place										
Iman El Amiri (Tunisia)	Omar	Saved by colleagues	Khaled	Khaled	Evicted	16th Place											
Ahmad Mustafa (Egypt)	Saved by public	Jessica	Khaled	Evicted	17th Place												
Fawaz El Mil (Kuwait)	Jessica	Iman	Evicted	18th Place													
Jessica Najem (Lebanon)	Saved by colleagues	Evicted	19th Place														
Omar Amer (Iraq)	Evicted	20th Place															

^Note 5.1: As there was a tie, Badr had the casting vote and he saved Khaled
^Note 5.2: As there was a tie, Dia had the casting vote and she saved Amal M
^Note 5.3: He withdrew from the academy in the semifinals week due to several fights with Mohamad qwidaer which made him take the decision to leave the academy. There were also rumors that the Saudi Arabia government advised all their citizens to leave Lebanon due to the current unrest

*at 12 May 2008 Abdullah Al-Dosari withdrew due to problems with Muhammad Qwaider, at the academy*

Tour

Nader, Mohamad, Saad, Shahinaz, Mirhan, Diaa and Amel B were chosen to be part of the tour. This was the first time only 7 students had been chosen for the tour (previous years had 8 or 9 students). However, for unknown reasons, the tour was cancelled.

=== Star Academy 6 ===
The winner of Star Academy 6 made history by being the first contestant from a country that already had a student win from it. Abdulaziz Abdulrahman from Saudi Arabia became the second Saudi Arabian, after Hisham Abdulrahman from season 2, to win the title.

Star Academy 6 has undergone some major changes, the studio was enlarged and the Academy itself went through an extreme makeover and now includes a theater for movies, a spa, and a DJ Studio.

Primes

Prime:	27/02/09 Prime 2	06/03/09 Prime 3	13/03/09 Prime 4	20/03/09 Prime 5	27/03/09 Prime 6	03/04/09 Prime 7	10/04/09 Prime 8	17/04/09 Prime 9	24/04/09 Prime 10	01/05/09 Prime 11	08/05/09 Prime 12	15/05/09 Prime 13	22/05/09 prime 14	29/05/09 Prime 15	05/06/09 prime 16	12/06/09 prime 17
Public's vote:	Mohamad S 44.45% Jaber; 40.03% Noura; 15.51%	Mohamad S 38.13% Meteb; 33.00% Michel R 28.87%	Mohamad S 57.38% Iness; 27.74% Noura; 14.88%	Zaher; 35.09% Nazem; 33.11% Iness; 31.80%	Yehya; 60.54% Mohamad S 29.52% Nazem; 9.94%	Khawla; 46.72% Yehya; 36.98% Mohamad S 16.03%	Nasser; 50.47% Khawla; 34.96% Zaher; 14.57%	Ibrahim; 43.07% Yehya; 34.07% Diala; 22.86%	Lara; 55.14% Nasser; 27.58% Tania; 17.28%	Lara; 49.29% Yehya; 36.94% Zaher; 13.77%	Abd Al Aziz; 62.18% Aya; 29.08% Yehya; 8.74%	Ibrahim; 50.44% Yehya; 43.76% Tania; 5.80%	Mohamad B 31.05% Lara; 68.95%	Lara; 64.91% Mohamad B 29.63% Tania; 5.46%	Ibrahim; 52.35% Lara; 47.65%	Abd Al Aziz; 50.30% Bassma; 26.12% Ibrahim; 19.55% Michel A 4.03%
Evicted :	Jaber; 5/17 votes	Meteb; 2/16 votes	Noura; 5/15 votes	Iness; 1/14 votes	Nazem; 6/13 votes	Mohamad S 4/12 votes	Khawla; 4/10 votes	Diala; 3/9 votes	Nasser; 2/8 votes	Zaher; 3/7 votes	Aya; 2/6 votes	Yehya; 2/5 votes	Both Stayed^{2}	Mohamad B Tania; Public's vote	Lara; Public's vote	
Contestants	Contestants' votes												Public's vote			
Abdulaziz Abdulrahman (Saudi Arabia)	Jaber	Meteb	Iness	Nazem	Nazem	Yehya	Zaher	Yehya	Nasser	Zaher	Saved by public	Yehya	Saved	Saved	Saved	Winner
Bassma Bossuel (Morocco)	Jaber	Michel R	Iness	Nazem	Nazem	Yehya	Khawla	Diala	Tania	Yehya	Yehya	Tania	Saved	Saved	Saved	2nd Place
Ibrahim Dashti (Kuwait)	Noura	Meteb	Noura	Nazem	Mohamad S	Mohamad S	Zaher	Saved by public	Tania	Yehya	Yehya	Saved by public	Saved	Saved	Saved by public	3rd Place
Michel Azzi (Lebanon)	Noura	Michel R	Noura	Nazem	Nazem	Yehya	Zaher	Yehya	Tania	Yehya	Yehya	Tania	Saved	Saved	Saved	4th Place
Lara Scandar (Egypt)	Noura	Michel R	Noura	Nazem	Mohamad S	Mohamad S	Khawla	Diala	Saved by public	Saved by public	Aya	Yehya	Saved	Saved by public	Evicted	5th Place
Mohamad Bash (Syria)	Noura	Michel R	Iness	Nazem	Nazem	Yehya	Zaher	Yehya	Tania	Zaher	Aya	Tania	Saved	Evicted	6th Place	
Tania Nemer (Lebanon)	Noura	Michel R	Noura	Nazem	Nazem	Yehya	Zaher	Diala	Saved by colleagues	Yehya	Yehya	Saved by colleagues	Saved	Evicted	7th Place	
Yehya Sweis (Jordan)	Noura	Michel R	Iness	Nazem	Saved by public	Saved by colleagues	Zaher	Saved by colleagues	Nasser	Saved by colleagues	Saved by colleagues	Evicted	8th Place			
Aya Abdelraoof (Egypt)	Noura	Michel R	Iness	Nazem	Mohamad S	Mohamad S	Khawla	Yehya	Tania	Zaher	Evicted	9th Place				
Zaher Zorgati (Tunisia)	Noura	Michel R	Iness	Saved by public	Mohamad S	Mohamad S	Saved by colleagues	Yehya	Tania	Evicted	10th Place					
Nasser Abu Lafi (Jordan)	Noura	Michel R	Noura	Nazem	Mohamad S	Yehya	Saved by public	Yehya	Evicted	11th Place						
Diala Ouda (Palestine)	Jaber	Michel R	Iness	Iness	Mohamad S	Yehya	Khawla	Evicted	12th Place							
Khawla Bin Amran (Morocco)	Jaber	Michel R	Iness	Nazem	Mohamad S	Saved by public	Evicted	13th Place								
Michel Rmeih (Lebanon)	Noura	Saved by colleagues	Iness	Nazem	Nazem	Yehya	Dropped Out After Prime 7	14th Place^{1}								
Mohamad Serag (Egypt)	Saved by public	Saved by public	Saved by public	Nazem	Saved by colleagues	Evicted	15th Place									
Nazem Ezzedine (Lebanon)	Noura	Michel R	Iness	Saved by colleagues	Evicted	16th Place										
Iness El Aswad (Tunisia)	Noura	Michel R	Saved by colleagues	Evicted	17th Place											
Noura El Ameeri (Kuwait)	Saved by colleagues	Michel R	Evicted	18th Place												
Meteb El Fahad (Saudi Arabia)	Jaber	Evicted	19th Place													
Jaber El Turki (Bahrain)	Evicted	20th Place														

^Note 6.1: He withdrew from the academy after not being in the weekly top 5.
^Note 6.2: Although it was a special prime for the children cancer center "St.Jude" in Lebanon both of them were not eliminated and their vote's percentage were donated automatically to St. jude children cancer medical center.

Tour

Abdulaziz, Bassma, Ibrahim, Michel A, Lara, Mohamed B, Tania, Yehya and Nasser were chosen to be part of the tour. Once again, unlike the previous season, the tour chose to have 9 students to participate. But once again, for unknown reasons, the tour was canceled.

=== Star Academy 7 ===
Star Academy 7 launched its first prime from Adma, Lebanon on 19 February 2010 on LBC.

This year's winner was Nassif Zaytoun from Syria. He made history by being the first contestant from Syria to win.

Also, Mehdi Bahmed became the first Algerian male in star academy history.

Primes

Prime:	26/02/10 Prime 2	05/03/10 Prime 3	12/03/10 Prime 4	19/03/10 Prime 5	26/03/10 Prime 6	02/04/10 Prime 7	09/04/10 Prime 8	16/04/10 Prime 9	23/04/10 Prime 10	30/04/10 Prime 11	07/05/10 Prime 12	14/05/10 Prime 13	21/05/10 Prime 14	28/05/10 prime 15	04/06/10 Prime 16
Public's vote:	Salwa; 46.02% Jack; 29.69% Aline; 24.29%	Mehdi; 57% Tahra; 38% Salwa; 5%	Tahra; 66.70% Bassel; 29.19% Aline; 4.11%	Mehdi; 67% Bassel; 27% Haitham; 6%	Tahra; 48.3% Mehdi; 31.06% Rania; 20.64%	Mahmoud; 36% Rania; 34% Miral; 30%	Tahra; 57% Mohamed M 37% Rayan; 6%	Zeina; 66.57% Bassel; 20.75% Abdelaziz; 12.68%	Tahra; 48.25% Abdelaziz; 24.24% Miral; 15.87% Asma; 11.64%	Zeina; 21.67% Mohamed M 36.69% Badreia; 41.64%	Zeina; 14.88% Mahmoud; 22.88% Tahra; 62.24%	Sultan; 42.53% Mahmoud; 17.69% Tahra; 39.78%	Sultan; 20.26% Rahma; 69.96% Asma; 9.78%	'Badreia'; 23.55% Rahma; 49.63% Ramy; 26.82%	Mohamed R 10.71% Nassif; 65.21% Rahma; 24.08%
Evicted :	Jack; 9/18 votes^{1}	Salwa; 4/17 votes	Aline; 8/16 votes^{2}	Haitham; 6/15 votes	Mehdi; 4/14 votes	Rania; 5/13 votes	Rayan; 5/12 votes	Bassel; 3/11 votes	Abdelaziz Miral; Abdelaziz: 1/9 Votes-Miral: 4/9 Votes^{3}	Mohamed M 4/8 votes^{4}	Zeina; 3/7 votes	Tahra; Mahmoud; Public's vote	Sultan; Asma; Public's vote^{5}	Ramy; Badreia; Public's vote^{5}	
Contestants	Contestants' votes											Public's vote			
Nassif Zeitoun (Syria)	Jack	Tahra	Bassel	Bassel	Mehdi	Miral	Rayan	Abdelaziz	Miral	Zeina	Zeina	Saved	Saved	Saved	Winner
Rahma Riad (Iraq)	Aline	Tahra	Bassel	Haitham	Rania	Miral	Mohamed M	Abdelaziz	Asma	Zeina	Zeina	Saved	Saved by public	Saved by public	2nd Place
Mohamed Ramadan (Jordan)	Aline	Tahra	Bassel	Bassel	Rania	Rania	Mohamed M	Bassel	Miral	Zeina	Zeina	Saved	Saved	Saved	3rd Place
Ramy Chemali (Lebanon)	Aline	Salwa	Aline	Bassel	Rania	Rania	Rayan	Abdelaziz	Asma	Zeina	Mahmoud	Saved	Saved	Evicted	4th Place
Badria Essaied (Tunisia)	Aline	Tahra	Aline	Haitham	Mehdi	Miral	Rayan	Bassel	Asma	Saved by public	Mahmoud	Saved	Saved	Evicted	5th Place
Sultan Bin Rashed (Saudi Arabia)	Jack	Tahra	Bassel	Haitham	Mehdi	Rania	Mohamed M	Abdelaziz	Abdelaziz	Mohamed M	Mahmoud	Saved by public	Evicted	6th Place	
Asma Mahalawi (Tunisia)	Aline	Tahra	Aline	Bassel	Rania	Miral	Mohamed M	Abdelaziz	Saved by colleagues	Mohamed M	Mahmoud	Saved	Evicted	7th Place	
Tahra Hmamish (Morocco)	Aline	Saved by colleagues	Saved by public	Haitham	Saved by public	Miral	Saved by public	Abdelaziz	Saved by public	Mohamed M	Saved by public	Evicted	8th Place		
Mahmoud Shokry (Egypt)	Jack	Tahra	Aline	Bassel	Rania	Saved by public	Mohamed M	Abdelaziz	Miral	Mohamed M	Saved by colleagues	Evicted	9th Place		
Zeina Aftimos (Syria)	Aline	Tahra	Aline	Bassel	Rania	Miral	Rayan	Saved by public	Miral	Saved by colleagues	Evicted	10th Place			
Mohamed Maghribi (Egypt)	Jack	Tahra	Bassel	Haitham	Rania	Rania	Saved by colleagues	Bassel	Asma	Evicted	11th Place				
Abdelaziz El-Difiri (Kuwait)	Jack	Tahra	Aline	Haitham	Rania	Miral	Rayan	Saved by colleagues	Evicted	12th Place					
Miral Faisal (Syria)	Jack	Salwa	Aline	Bassel	Mehdi	Saved by colleagues	Mohamed M	Abdelaziz	Evicted	13th Place					
Bassel El-Khoury (Jordan)	Jack	Tahra	Saved by colleagues	Saved by colleagues	Rania	Rania	Mohamed M	Evicted	14th Place						
Rayan Eid (Lebanon)	Aline	Tahra	Aline	Bassel	Rania	Miral	Evicted	15th Place							
Rania El Nejeb (Egypt)	Aline	Salwa	Bassel	Bassel	Saved by colleagues	Evicted	16th Place								
Mehdi Bahmed (Algeria)	Jack	Saved by public	Bassel	Saved by public	Evicted	17th Place									
Haitham El-Khozoum (Saudi Arabia)	Jack	Tahra	Bassel	Evicted	18th Place										
Aline Kassis (Lebanon)	Saved by colleagues	Salwa	Evicted	19th Place											
Salwa Taaliby (Morocco)	Saved by public	Evicted	20th Place												
Jack Haddad (Lebanon)	Evicted	21st Place													

^Note 7.1: As there was a tie, Salwa had the casting vote and she saved Aline
^Note 7.2: As there was a tie, Tahra had the casting vote and she saved Bassel
^Note 7.3: As there was a tie, Tahra had the casting vote and she saved Asma
^Note 7.4: As there was a tie, Badreia had the casting vote and she saved Zeina
^Note 7.5: There were rumors that the lines in Iraq to vote for Rahma were free of charge on certain days

Tour

Nassif, Rahma, Mohamed R, Ramy, Badria, Sultan, Asma, Tahra, Mahmoud, Zeina, Abdulaziz, Miral and Rayan were chosen to be part of the tour, but following the shocking and unexpected death of Ramy, the tour was cancelled.

=== Star Academy 8 ===
Nesma Alaa Ali Mahgoub, a 20-year-old student from Egypt, was the winner this year. She is the second Egyptian to win in the show, after Mohamed Atieh, the second female contestant to win, after Shada Hassoun, and also the second candidate to win in the Arab show by singing mostly the western genre, after Nader Guirat.

Prime:	08/04/11 Prime 2	15/04/11 Prime 3	22/04/11 Prime 4	29/04/11 Prime 5	06/05/11 Prime 6	13/05/11 Prime 7	20/05/11 Prime 8	27/05/11 Prime 9	03/06/11 Prime 10	10/06/11 Prime 12	17/06/11 Prime 13	24/06/11 Prime 14	1/07/11 Prime 15	08/07/11 prime 16	15/07/11 prime 17	Winner
Public's Votes:	Karima; 77.02% Lian; 12.43% Mohamed Q. 10.38%	Karim; 46.55% Mohamed Rah. 44.24% Lamya; 09.21%	AbdeSalam; 57.43% Husam; 33.04% Mohamed Rah. 09.54%	Karim; 55.91% Yasmine; 26.95% Nina; 17.15%	Karim; 36.46% Karima; 33.51% Ahmed; 30.03%	Ahmed; 81.88% Husam; 10.92% Mohamed Raf. 07.20%	Mohamed A. 27.78% Husam; 38.34% Nina; 33.88%	Ahmed; 75.93% Husam; 10.25% Mohamed A. 13.82%	AbdeSalam; 57.94% Mohamed A. 12.34% Christine; 29.72%	AbdeSalam; 70.48% Efram; 17.04% Mohamed D. 12.48%	AbdeSalam; 60.21% Christine; 22.17% Lian; 17.62%	Ahmed; 62.05% AbdeSalam; 35.67% Lian; 02.28%	Gilbert; 46.64% Mohamed D. 15.72% Lian; 37.64%	Gilbert; 16.1% Oumayma; 14.3% Ahmed; 69.96%	Sarah; 21.83% Nesma; 48.37% Ahmed; 29.80%	Nesma
Eliminated :	Mohamed Q. 7/17 votes	Lamya; 6/16 votes	Mohamed Rah. 5/15 votes	Yasmine; 7/14 votes^{1}	Karima; 6/13 votes	Mohamed Raf. 6/12 votes^{2}	Nina; 5/11 votes	Husam; 3/9 votes	Mohamed A. 3/8 votes	Efram; 3/7 votes	Christine; 1/6 votes	AbdeSalam; 2/5 votes	Mohamed D. Lian Public's vote	Oumayma Gilbert Public's vote^{3}	Sarah Ahmed Public's vote	
Contestants	Contestants' votes												Public's vote			
Contestants	Prime 2	Prime 3	Prime 4	Prime 5	Prime 6	Prime 7	Prime 8	Prime 9	Prime 10	Prime 11	Prime 12	Prime 13	Prime 14	Prime 15	Prime 16	Rank
Nesma Mahgoub (Egypt)	Lian	Lamya	Mohamed Rah.	Yasmine	Ahmed	Mohamed Raf.	Nina	Mohamed A.	Christine	Efram	Lian	AbdeSalam	Saved by Judges	Saved by Judges	Winner	
Ahmed Ezzat (Egypt)	Lian	Mohamed Rah.	Mohamed Rah.	Yasmine	Saved by Students	Saved by Public Husam^{2}	Mohamed A.	Saved by Public	Mohamed A.	Mohamed D.	Lian	Saved by Public	Saved by Judges	Saved by Public	2nd Place	
Sarah Farah (Syria)	Lian	Mohamed Rah.	Husam	Yasmine	Karima	Husam	Mohamed A.	Husam	Christine	Mohamed D.	Lian	Lian	Saved by Judges	Saved by Judges	3rd Place	
Gilbert Simon (Lebanon)	Lian	Mohamed R.	Husam	Nina	Karima	Mohamed R.	Nina	Husam	Mohamed A.	Efram	Christine	Lian	Saved by Public	Eliminated	4th Place	
Oumayma Taleb (Tunisia)	Lian	Lamya	Husam	Yasmine	Karima	Husam	Mohamed A.	Mohamed A.	Christine	Mohamed D.	Lian	Lian	Saved by Judges	Eliminated	5th Place	
Lian Bazlamit (Palestine)	Saved by Students	Lamya	Husam	Nina	Ahmed	Mohamed Raf.	Nina	Mohamed A.	Christine	Mohamed D.	Saved by Students	Saved by Students	Eliminated	6th Place		
Mohamed Dakdouk (Syria)	Mohamed Q.	Mohamed Rah.	Husam	Nina	Ahmed	Husam	Mohamed A.	Mohamed A.	Mohamed A.	Saved by Students	Lian	AbdeSalam	Eliminated	7th Place		
AbdeSalam Mohamed (Kuwait)	Mohamed Q.	Mohamed Rah.	Saved by Public	Nina	Ahmed	Mohamed Raf.	Mohamed A.	Mohamed A.	Saved by Public	Saved by Public	Saved by Public	Eliminated	8th Place			
Christine Saadeh (Lebanon)	Lian	Mohamed Rah.	Husam	Nina	Ahmed	Mohamed Raf.	Nina	Mohamed A.	Saved by Students	Efram	Eliminated	9th Place				
Efram Salemeh (Lebanon)	Lian	Mohamed Rah.	Husam	Nina	Karima	Husam	Nina	Husam	Christine	Eliminated	10th Place					
Mohamed Abdallah (Saudi Arabia)	Mohamed Q.	Mohamed Rah.	Mohamed Rah.	Nina	Ahmed	Husam	Saved by Students	Saved by Students	Eliminated	11th Place						
Husam Taha (Syria)	Mohamed Q.	Mohamed Rah.	Saved by Students	Yasmine	Karima	Saved by Students	Saved by Public	Eliminated	12th Place							
Karim Kamel (Egypt)	Mohamed Q.	Saved by Public	Mohamed Rah.	Saved by Public Nina^{1}	Saved by Public	Husam	Mohamed A.	Dropped-Out right after 8th prime	13th Place							
Nina Abdelmalak (Lebanon)	Lian	Lamya	Husam	Saved by Students	Ahmed	Mohamed Raf.	Eliminated	14th Place								
Mohamed Rafe3 (Jordan)	Mohamed Q.	Mohamed Rah.	Husam	Yasmine	Karima	Eliminated	15th Place									
Karima Gouit (Morocco)	Saved by Public	Lamya	Mohamed Rah.	Yasmine	Eliminated	16th Place										
Yasmine Ahjouwi (Morocco)	Lian	Lamya	Husam	Eliminated	17th Place											
Mohamed Rahma (Bahrain)	Mohamed Q.	Saved by Students	Eliminated	18th Place												
Lamya Jamal (Tunisia)	Lian	Eliminated	19th Place													
Mohamed El Qaq (Jordan)	Eliminated	20th Place														

^Note 8.1: As there was a tie, Karim had the casting vote and he saved Nina.
^Note 8.2: As there was a tie, Ahmad had the casting vote and he saved Husam.
^Note 8.3: The results were not shown. However, the presenter, Hilda Khalife, said that Ahmad got 96%.

	Guest(s)
Prime 1	Warda Al-Jazairia
Prime 2	Haifa Wehbe | Adam Clay
Prime 3	Ramy Ayach | Sophia El Mareekh
Prime 4	Melhem Zein | Eddy Wata
Prime 5	Marwan Khoury | Alexander Nestor Haddaway
Prime 6	Nabil Shouail | Andrea
Prime 7	Tony Hana | Joseph Attieh
Prime 8	Assi el Helani | Akcent
Prime 9	Ayman Zbib | Vika Jigulina
Prime 10	Angham | Ahmed Esherif
Prime 11	Yara | Mohombi
Prime 12	Ehab Tawfik | Rouwaida Attieh
Prime 13	Myriam Fares | Nasif Zayton
Prime 14	Sherine | Fady Andrawos
Prime 15	Samira Said | Saad Ramadan | Bassem Feghali
Prime 16	Najwa Karam | Saber Rebaï

	Top 5	Top 4	Top 3	Top 2	Top 1
Prime 2	Yasmine	Ahmed	Oumayma	Nesma	Mohamed D.
Prime 3	Gilbert	AbdeSalam	Christine	Yasmine	Nesma
Prime 4	Mohamed A.	Lian	Nesma	Sarah	Gilbert
Prime 5	Christine	Mohamed Raf.	Nesma	Gilbert	Sarah
Prime 6	Lian	Nesma	Gilbert	Sarah	AbdeSalam
Prime 7	Mohamed D.	Gilbert	Oumayma	Sarah	Efram
Prime 8	Efram	Sarah	Gilbert	Oumayma	Nesma
Prime 9	Lian	Nesma	AbdeSalam	Sarah	Oumayma
Prime 10	– – –	Efram	Oumayma	Nessma	Gilbert
Prime 11	– – –	Christine	Nesma	Sarah	Ahmed
Prime 12	– – –	Oumayma	Ahmed	Nesma	Sarah
Prime 13	– – –	– – –	Sarah	Oumayma	Mohamed D.

=== Star Academy 9 ===
Star Academy Arabia returned with a brand new name after a hiatus of over a year. The series began on 26 September 2013 and ended on 9 January 2014, and was produced by Endemol Middle East. It aired on three channels including LBCI and CBC Egypt. Mahmoud is also the second winner to be a nominee without being saved by the public, as he had received a low percentage of votes after Nader Guirat. The contestants of this series were, in order of elimination: 1. Menna Hany 2. Marita Abi Nader 3. Issa Almarzoug 4. Taher Mostafa 5. Mayssa Mejri 6. Maria Sarkis 7. Nour Farawati 8. Lilia Ben Chikha 9. Zaki Chreif 10. Mosab Al Khateeb 11. Abdallah Abd Al Aziz 12. Rana Samaha 13. Soukaina Boukries 14. Jean Chahid 15. Zinab Oussama 16. Mahmoud Mohey (Winner)

	Prime 2; 03/10/2013	Prime 3; 10/10/2013	Prime 4; 17/10/2013	Prime 5; 24/10/2013	Prime 6; 31/10/2013	Prime 7; 07/11/2013	Prime 8; 14/11/2013	Prime 9; 21/11/2013	Prime 10; 28/11/2013	Prime 11; 05/12/2013	Prime 12; 12/12/2013	Prime 13; 19/12/2013	Prime 14; 26/12/2013	Prime 15; 09/01/2014
Contestants	Contestants' votes								Public's vote					
(Egypt) Mahmoud	Menna	Marita	Nour	Taher	Nour	Nour	Mosab	Peers' Save	–	–	–	–	–	WINNER
(Morocco) Zinab	Maria	Jean	Nour	Mayssa	Nour	Nour	Mosab	Lilia	–	–	–	–	Public's Save	2nd Place
(Lebanon) Jean	Maria	Peers' Save	Issa	Mayssa	Nour	Maria	Mosab	Mahmoud	–	–	–	–	–	3rd Place
(Morocco) Soukaina	Maria	Jean	Nour	Mayssa	Mayssa	Maria	Mosab	Public's Save	–	–	–	Public's Save	Eliminated	4th Place
(Egypt) Rana	Maria	Marita	Nour	Taher	Nour	Maria	Mosab	Mahmoud	Public's Save	–	Public's Save	Eliminated	5th Place	
(Saudi Arabia) Abdallah	Maria	Jean	Issa	Mayssa	Nour	Maria	Mosab	Lilia	–	Public's Save	Eliminated	6th Place		
(Jordan) Mosab	Maria	Jean	Nour	Mayssa	Nour	Nour	Peers' Save	Mahmoud	–	Eliminated	7th Place			
(Lebanon) Zaki	Maria	Jean	Nour	Mayssa	Nour	Nour	Public's Save	Mahmoud	Eliminated	8th Place				
(Tunisia) Lilia	Menna	Marita	Nour	Mayssa	Public's Save	Nour	Nour	Eliminated	9th Place					
(Syria) Nour	Maria	Jean	Peers' Save	Mayssa	Peers' Save	Peers' Save	Eliminated	10th Place						
(Lebanon) Maria	Peers' Save	Marita	Issa	Public's Save	Mayssa	Eliminated	11th Place							
(Tunisia) Mayssa	Maria	Jean	Nour	Peers' Save	Eliminated	12th Place								
(Egypt) Taher	Menna	Public's Save	Public's Save	Eliminated	13th Place									
(Kuwait) Issa	Public's Save	Jean	Eliminated	14th Place										
(Lebanon) Marita	Maria	Eliminated	15th Place											
(Egypt) Menna	Eliminated	16th Place												
Public's Votes	Issa; 45.18% Maria; 41.92% Menna; 12.90%	Taher; 55.72% Marita; 33.77% Jean; 10.51%	Taher; 40.12% Issa; 36.88% Nour; 23.00%	Maria; 45.82% Taher; 44.23% Mayssa; 9.95%	Lilia; 49.47% Nour; 38.40% Mayssa; 12.13%	Mosab; 39.30% Maria; 36.26% Nour; 24.43%	Zaki; 60.69% Nour; 20.85% Mosab; 18.46%	Soukaina; 59.00% Mahmoud; 21.57% Lilia; 19.43%	Rana; 70.32% Zaki; 29.68%	Abdallah; 71.51% Mosab; 28.49%	Rana; 66.78% Abdallah; 33.22%	Soukaina; 52.99% Rana; 47.01%	Zinab; 50.12% Soukaina; 49.88%	Mahmoud; 45.74% Zinab; 42.82% Jean; 11.44%
Eliminated	Menna; 3/13 votes	Marita; 4/12 votes	Issa; 3/11 votes	Taher; 2/10 votes	Mayssa; 2/9 votes	Maria; 4/8 votes	Nour; 1/7 votes	Lilia; 2/6 votes	Zaki	Mosab	Abdallah	Rana	Soukaina	Jean | Zinab
Eliminated	Menna; 3/13 votes	Marita; 4/12 votes	Issa; 3/11 votes	Taher; 2/10 votes	Mayssa; 2/9 votes	Maria; 4/8 votes	Nour; 1/7 votes	Lilia; 2/6 votes	Zaki	Mosab	Abdallah	Rana	Soukaina	Mahmoud; Winner

Guests
Prime 1	Nancy Ajram	Prime 9	Soma | Amal Bashousha
Prime 2	Saad Ramadan	Prime 10	Amina | Sara Farah
Prime 3	Haifa Wehbi	Prime 11	Amal Maher
Prime 4	Nawal Alzogby	Prime 12	Joe Achkar
Prime 5	Rahma Ryad	Prime 13	Maya Diab
Prime 6	Lara Skandar	Prime 14	Nassif Zaytoun
Prime 7	Sherine Abd Elwahab	Prime 15	Kadhem Saher
Prime 8	Rami Sabri | Myriam Atallah	Prime 16	Wael Kfoury

=== Star Academy 10 ===
The winner of Star Academy 10 made history by being the first contestant from a country that already had a student win from it. Mohammed Chahin from Egypt became the 4th Egyptian to win the title, and the 3rd consecutive one after Mahmoud Mohey in Season 9 and Nesma Mahgoub In Season 8 .

Primes

Prime:	18/09/2014 Prime 2	25/09/2014 Prime 3	02/10/2014 Prime 4	09/10/2014 Prime 5	16/10/2014 Prime 6	23/10/2014 Prime 7	30/10/2014 Prime 8	06/11/2014 Prime 9	13/11/2014 Prime 10	20/11/2014 Prime 11	27/11/2014 Prime 12	04/12/2014 Prime 13	11/12/2014 Prime 14	18/12/2014 prime 15	25/12/2014 Prime 16
Public's vote:	Ismail; 37.46% Mohammed H 33.76% Ichraq; 28.78%	Abdelsalam; 38.59% Ali; 32.32% Mohammed H 29.09%	Ismail; 36.28% Doaa; 30.26% Ali; 33.46%	Rayan; 36.12% Doaa; 33.29% Mina; 30.59%	Ibtisaam; 75.84% Shereen; 13.42% Ismail; 10.74%	Abdelsalam; 47.65% Kenza; 40.46% Rayan; 11.89%	Abdelsalam; 38.49% Rita; 27.67% Elie; 33.84%	Laith; 52.66% Shereen; 47.34%	Abdelsalam; 60.76% Laith; 39.24%	Kenza; 64.81% Abdelsalam; 35.19%	Ghada; 51.36% Ibtisaam; 48.64%	Mina; 53.86% Kenza; 46.14%	Lea; 54.35% Elie; 45.65%	Ghada; 51.30% Mina; 48.70%	Mohammed C 51.90% Lea; 24.82% Ghada; 23.28%
Evicted :	Ichraq; 4/14 votes	Mohammed H 4/13 votes	Ali; 5/12 votes	Doaa; 3/11 votes	Ismail; 3/10 votes	Rayan; 1/9 votes	Rita; 1/8 votes	Shereen; Public's vote	Laith; Public's vote	Abdelsalam; Public's vote	Ibtisaam; Public's vote	Kenza; Public's vote	Elie; Public's vote	Mina; Public's vote	Lea; Ghada; Public's vote
Contestants	Contestants' votes												Public's vote		
Mohammed C	Mohammed H	Ali	Doaa	Mina	Shereen	Kenza	Rita	Saved	Saved	Saved	Saved	Saved	Saved	Saved	Winner
Lea	Mohammed H	Ali	Ali	Mina	Shereen	Kenza	Elie	Saved	Saved	Saved	Saved	Saved	Saved by public	Saved	2nd Place
Ghada	Ichraq	Ali	Ali	Mina	Shereen	Kenza	Elie	Saved	Saved	Saved	Saved by public	Saved	Saved	Saved by public	3rd Place
Mina	Mohammed H	Ali	Doaa	Saved by colleagues	Shereen	Kenza	Elie	Saved	Saved	Saved	Saved	Saved by public	Saved	Evicted	4th Place
Elie	Mohammed H	Ali	Ali	Mina	Shereen	Kenza	Saved by colleagues	Saved	Saved	Saved	Saved	Saved	Evicted	5th Place	
Kenza	Ichraq	Mohammed H	Doaa	Mina	Shereen	Saved by colleagues	Elie	Saved	Saved	Saved by public	Saved	Evicted	6th Place		
Ibtisaam	Mohammed H	Mohammed H	Doaa	Doaa	Saved by public	Kenza	Elie	Saved	Saved	Saved	Evicted	7th Place			
Abdelsalam	Mohammed H	Saved by public	Doaa	Mina	Ismail	Saved by public	Saved by public	Saved	Saved by public	Evicted	8th Place				
Laith	Mohammed H	Ali	Doaa	Doaa	Isamil	Rayan	Elie	Saved by public	Evicted	9th Place					
Shereen	Mohammed H	Ali	Doaa	Mina	Saved by colleagues	Kenza	Elie	Evicted	10th Place						
Rita	Ichraq	Ali	Ali	Mina	Shereen	Kenza	Evicted	11th Place							
Rayan	Mohammed H	Ali	Ali	Saved by public	Ismail	Evicted	12th Place								
Ismail	Saved by public	Mohammed H	Saved by public	Doaa	Evicted	13th Place									
Doaa	Ichraq	Mohammed H	Saved by colleagues	Evicted	14th Place										
Ali	Mohammed H	Saved by colleagues	Evicted	15th Place											
Mohammed H	Saved by colleagues	Evicted	16th Place												
Ichraq	Evicted	17th Place													

=== Star Academy 11 ===
Star Academy 11 began on 16 October 2015 and ended on 29 January 2016, with Marwan Youssef from Lebanon crowned the season's winner. Marwan is the second Lebanese contestant to win the first place title after Joseph Attieh (Star Academy 3). The season was produced by Endemol Shine Middle East and broadcast on Lebanese Broadcasting Corporation International aka LBC Lebanon) and Capital Broadcasting Center aka CBC (Egypt) tv networks. Among many other prizes awarded to the winner of the season, Marwan Youssef won a song produced by Endemol, and released his first single "Watan Hobi." Marwan later went on to release a second single alone with Watary Productions record label titled "Rafed Saddek," which saw great success and lead to him filming his first music video for the song. Marwan has since performed many concerts and performed in important music festivals. This also had a few noteworthy and historical things to mention for example, Ihab Amir made history as the first male Moroccan contestant since the first season and being the second male Moroccan contestant after Amine Errachidi in the first season. Also Algeria made history this season as this was the first time in the show's entire run that more than one contestant was chosen to represent the North African nation.. And Anis Bourahla also made history as the second Algerian male after Mehdi Bahmed from Season 7.

Prime:	23/10/2015 Prime 2	30/10/2015 Prime 3	06/11/2015 Prime 4	13/11/2015 Prime 5	20/11/2015 Prime 6	27/11/2015 Prime 7	04/12/2015 Prime 8	11/12/2015 Prime 9	18/12/2015 Prime 10	25/11/2015 Prime 11	01/01/2016 Prime 12	08/01/2016 Prime 13	15/01/2016 Prime 14	22/01/2016 prime 15	29/01/2016 prime 16	
Public's Votes:	Faten; 6.25% Youssef; 35.08% Raphael; 58.67%	Soukaina; 26.95% Faten; 7.62%% Hanane; 65.43%	Mabelle; 22.64% Ali; 41.04% Soukaina; 36.32%	Mohammed S 23.00% Souhaila; 52.63% Mortada; 24.37%	Chantal; 18.21% Mohammed S 14.89% Hanane; 66.90%	Souhaila; 44.10% Ali; 48.90% Chantal; 6.00%	Hanane; 63.23% Dina; 22.16% Chantal; 14.60%	Haidy; 53.67% Ali; 46.33%	Anis; 54.30% Mabelle; 45.70%	Raphael; 70.76% Anis; 29.24%	Ihab; 48.60% Dina; 51.40%	Raphael; 54.32% Dina; 45.68%	Raphael; 40.57% Nassim; 59.43%	Nassim; 51.12% Hanane; 48.88%	Haidy; 19.82% Marwan; 55.46% Mohammed A 6.55% Nassim; 18.67%	Marwan
Eliminated :	Youssef; 5/15 votes	Faten; 4/14 votes	Soukaina; 3/13 votes	Mortada; 2/12 votes^{1}	Mohammed S 3/11 votes	Souhaila dropped out^{2}	Chantal; 4/9 votes	Ali; 46.33%	Mabelle; 45.70%	Anis; 29.24%	Ihab; 48.60%	Dina; 45.68%	Raphael; 40.57%	Hanane; 48.88%		
Contestants	Contestants' votes												Public's vote			
Contestants	Prime 2	Prime 3	Prime 4	Prime 5	Prime 6	Prime 7	Prime 8	Prime 9	Prime 10	Prime 11	Prime 12	Prime 13	Prime 14	Prime 15	Prime 16	Rank
Marwan Youssef (Lebanon)	Youssef	Faten	Mabelle	Mohammed S	Chantal	N/A	Chantal	N/A	N/A	N/A	N/A	N/A	N/A	N/A	Winner	
Haidy Mossa (Egypt)	Faten	Soukaina	Mabelle	Mohammed S	Mohammed S	N/A	Dina	Saved by Public	N/A	N/A	N/A	N/A	N/A	N/A	2nd Place	
Nassim El Rassi (Tunisia)	Faten	Soukaina	Mabelle	Mohammed S	Chantal	N/A	Dina	N/A	N/A	N/A	N/A	N/A	Saved by Public	Saved by Public	3rd Place	
Mohammed Abbas (Egypt)	Youssef	Soukaina	Mabelle	Mohammed S	Mohammed S	N/A	Dina	N/A	N/A	N/A	N/A	N/A	N/A	N/A	4th Place	
Hanane El Khathar (Morocco)	Faten	Saved by Public	Soukaina	Mohammed S	Saved by Public	N/A	Saved by Public	N/A	N/A	N/A	N/A	N/A	N/A	Eliminated	5th Place	
Raphael Jabbour (Lebanon)	Saved by Public	Soukaina	Mabelle	Mohammed S	Chantal	N/A	Chantal	N/A	N/A	Saved by Public	N/A	Saved by Public	Eliminated	6th Place		
Dina Adel (Egypt)	Faten	Soukaina	Mabelle	Mohammed S	Mohammed S	N/A	Saved by Students	N/A	N/A	N/A	Saved by Public	Eliminated	7th Place			
Ihab Amir (Morocco)	Faten	Soukaina	Soukaina	Mohammed S	Chantal	N/A	Dina	N/A	N/A	N/A	Eliminated	8th Place				
Anis Bourahla (Algeria)	Youssef	Soukaina	Mabelle	Mortada	Chantal	N/A	Dina	N/A	Saved by Public	Eliminated	9th Place					
Mabelle (Lebanon)	Faten	Soukaina	Saved by Students	Mohammed S	Chantal	N/A	Chantal	N/A	Eliminated	10th Place						
Ali El Faisal (Saudi Arabia)	Faten	Faten	Saved by Public	Mortada	Chantal	Souhaila Dropped-Out, Ali Safe	Chantal	Eliminated	11th Place							
Chantal (Lebanon)	Youssef	Faten	Mabelle	Mohammed S	Saved by Students	Souhaila Dropped-Out, Chantal Safe	Eliminated	12th Place								
Souhaila (Algeria)	Faten	Soukaina	Soukaina	Saved by Public	Chantal	Dropped-Out	13th Place									
Mohammed Saad (Egypt)	Youssef	Soukaina	Mabelle	Saved by Students	Eliminated	14th Place										
Mortada Nejem (Iraq)	Faten	Faten	Mabelle	Eliminated	15th Place											
Soukaina (Morocco)	Faten	Saved by Students	Eliminated	16th Place												
Faten Abdelhamid (Bahrain)	Saved by Students	Eliminated	17th Place													
Youssef Darwish (Syria)	Eliminated	18th Place														

Marwan Youssef winner of star academy 11

|Public's Votes: |Faten
6.25%%
Yousef
35.08%
Rapheal
58.67% |soukaina
26.95%
Faten
7.62%
Hanane
65.43% |Mabell
22.64%
Ali
41.04%
Soukaina
36.32% |Mohameds
23.00%
Souhila
52.63%
Mortada
24.37% |Chantal
18.21%
Mohameds
14.89%
Hanane
66.90% |Souhila
?
Ali
?%
Chantal
?% |Hanane
63.23%
Dena
22.16%
Chantal
14.60 |Haidy
53.67%
Ali
47.33% |Anis
54.30%
Mabell
45.70% |Rapheal
70.76
Anis
29.24% |Ihab
48.60%
Dena
51.40% |Dena
45.68
Rapheal
54.32% |Rapheal
40.57
Nassim
59.43% |Nassim
51.12%
Hanane
48.88% |Haidy
19.32%
Marwan
55.46%
Mohameda
6.55% Nassim
18.67%

== Milestones, recordholders and trivia ==
Finalist Contestants:
-Star Academy 1:
.Mohamed Attieh (Egypt); Winner.
.Bashar Shatii (Kuwait).
-Star Academy 2:
.Hisham Abdulrahman (KSA); Winner.
.Amani Swissi (Tunisia).
-Star Academy 3:
.Joseph Attieh (Lebanon); Winner.
.Hani Hussein (Egypt).
.Hanaa Idrissi (Morocco).
-Star Academy 4:
.Shatha Hassoun (Iraq); First Female Winner.
.Marwa Bin Sughaiyer (Tunisia).
.Mohamed Kammah (Egypt).
.Carlo Nakhla (Lebanon).
-Star Academy 5:
.Nader Guirat (Tunisia); Winner.
.Mohamed Qwidar (Jordan).
.Sa'ad Ramadan (Lebanon).
-Star Academy 6:
.Abdulaziz Abdelrahman (KSA); Second Winner from KSA .
.Bassma Bousail (Morocco).
.Ibrahim Dashti (Kuwait).
.Michel Azzi (Lebanon).
-Star Academy 7:
.Nassif Zeytoun (Syria); Winner.
.Rahma Mezher (Iraq)
.Mohamed Ramadan (Jordan).
-Star Academy 8:
.Nesma Mahgoub (Egypt); Second Winner from Egypt & Second Female Winner.
.Ahmed Ezzat (Egypt);
.Sarah Farah (Syria);
-Star Academy 9:
.Mahmoud Mohey (Egypt); Third Winner from Egypt
.Zinab Oussama (Morocco)
.Jean Chahid (Lebanon)
-Star Academy 10:
.Mohammad Chahine (Egypt); Fourth Winner from Egypt
. Lea Makhoul (Lebanon)
.Ghada Jreidi (Tunisia)
-Star Academy 11
.Marwan Youssef (Lebanon); Second Winner From Lebanon
.Heidi Moussa (Egypt)
.Nassim Reissi (Tunisia)
.Mohammad Abbass (Egypt)

Semi-Finalist Contestants:
-Star Academy 1: Baha'a AlKaffy (Tunis)
-Star Academy 2: ZeeZee Adel (Egypt)
-Star Academy 3: Chayma Hilali (Tunis) & Fady Andraos (Palestine)
-Star Academy 4: Sally Ahmed (Egypt)
-Star Academy 5: Shahinaz (Egypt)
-Star Academy 6: Lara Skandar (Egypt)
-Star Academy 7: Ramy Shamali (Lebanon) & Baderia Elsayed (Tunisia)
-Star Academy 8: Oumayma Taleb (Tunisia) & Gilbert Simon (Lebanon)
-Star Academy 9: Soukaina Boukries (Morocco)
-Star Academy 10: Mina Atta (Egypt)
-Star Academy 11: Hanane El Khader (Morocco)

Contestants who have won Top 1 the most in each season:
- Star Academy 1: Myriam (Syria) – 4 wins.
- Star Academy 2: Amani (Tunisia) – 2 wins.
- Star Academy 3: Hani (Egypt) – 3 wins. (Tie)
- Star Academy 4: Mohamed Kammah (Egypt) – 2 wins. (Tie)
- Star Academy 4: Shatha hassoun(Iraq) – 2 wins. (Tie)
- Star Academy 5: Nader (Tunisia) – 3 wins. (Tie)
- Star Academy 6: Bassma (Morocco) – 3 wins. (Tie)
- Star Academy 6: Aya (Egypt) – 2wins (Tie)
- Star Academy 7: Mohammed Ramadan (Jordan) – 3 wins. (Tie)
- Star Academy 8: Nisma Mahgoub (Egypt) – 2 wins. (Tie)
- Star Academy 8: Sarah Farah (Syria) – 2 wins. (Tie)
- Star Academy 8: Gilbert Simon (Lebanon) – 2 wins. (Tie)
- Star Academy 8: Mohamed Daqdouq (Syria) – 2 wins. (Tie)
- Star Academy 9: Lilia Ben Chikha (Tunisia) – 2 wins. (Tie)
- Star Academy 9: Zinab Oussama (Morocco) – 2 wins. (Tie)
- Star Academy 9: Abdallah Abd Al Aziz (Saudi Arabia) – 2 wins. (Tie)
- Star Academy 10: Mina Atta (Egypt) – 2 wins. (Tie)
- Star Academy 11: Haidy Moussa (Egypt) – 2 wins. (Tie)
- Star Academy 11: Marwan Youssef (Lebanon) – 2 wins. (Tie)

Contestants who won the title without any nominations:
- Star Academy 3: Joseph Attieyh (Lebanon)
- Star Academy 7: Nassif Zeytoun (Syria)
- Star Academy 8: Nesma Mahgoub (Egypt)
- Star Academy 10: Mohammad Chahine (Egypt)
- Star Academy 11: Marwan Youssef (Lebanon)

Contestants who have never been chosen as nominees:
- Star Academy 2: Amani Swaisi (Tunisia)
- Star Academy 3: Joseph Attiyah (Lebanon)
- Star Academy 3: Hana'a Idrissy (Morocco)
- Star Academy 4: Marwa Bin Sughaiyer (Tunisia)
- Star Academy 4: Carlo Nakhla (Lebanon)
- Star Academy 5: Sa'ad Ramadhan (Lebanon)
- Star Academy 6: Basma Boussil (Morocco)
- Star Academy 6: Michel Azzi (Lebanon)
- Star Academy 7: Nassif Zeytoun (Syria)
- Star Academy 7: Mohamed Ramadan (Jordan)
- Star Academy 8: Nesma Mahgoub (Egypt)
- Star Academy 8: Sarah Farah (Syria)
- Star Academy 10: Mohammed Shahin (Egypt)
- Star Academy 11: Mohammed Abass (Egypt)
- Star Academy 11: Marwan Youssef (Lebanon)

Most nominated contestants in Star Academy in each season:
- Star Academy 1: Sophia (Morocco) – 4 nominations (Tie)
- Star Academy 1: Mira (Lebanon) – 4 nominations (Tie)
- Star Academy 1: Soumaya (Tunisia) – 4 nominations (Tie)
- Star Academy 2: Hisham (KSA) – 4 nominations (Tie)
- Star Academy 2: Ahmed S (Bahrain) – 4 nominations (Tie)
- Star Academy 3: Rym Ghazali (Algeria) – 6 nominations (Tie)
- Star Academy 4: Sally (Egypt) – 5 nominations (Tie)
- Star Academy 4: Ali (KSA) – 5 nominations (Tie)
- Star Academy 5: Dia'a Taybi (Morocco) – 6 nominations (Tie)
- Star Academy 6: Yehya Swiss (Jordan) – 6 nominations (Tie)
- Star Academy 7: Tahra (Morocco)- 7 nominations; More than any contestant in Star Academy history.
- Star Academy 8: Abdelsalam Mohamed (Kuwait) – 5 nominations (Tie)
- Star Academy 8: Ahmed Ezzat (Egypt) – 5 nominations (Tie)
- Star Academy 9: Nour Farawati (Syria) – 4 nominations (Tie)
- Star Academy 10: Abdelsalam Alzayid (Kuwait) – 5 nominations. (Tie)
- Star Academy 11: Raphael Jabbour (Lebanon) – 4 nominations (Tie)
- Star Academy 11: Hanane El Khader (Morocco) – 4 nominations (Tie)

Most nominated contestants' wins by Public votes:
- Star Academy 1: Mohammad Attia (Egypt)- 3 wins. (Tie)
- Star Academy 2: Hisham Abdulrahman (KSA) – 4 wins. (Tie)
- Star Academy 3: Rym Ghazali (Algeria) – 5 wins; More than any contestant in Star Academy history. (Tie)
- Star Academy 4: Ali Al-Saad (KSA)- 4 wins. (Tie)
- Star Academy 4:Maisoun Sedaki (Egypt)- 2 wins. (Tie)
- Star Academy 4:Sally Ahmed (Egypt)- 2 wins. (Tie)
- Star Academy 4:Ahmed Dawoud (Kuwait) – 2 wins. (Tie)
- Star Academy 5:Dia'a Taybi (Morocco)- 3 wins. (Tie)
- Star Academy 5:Amal Bouchoha (Algeria) – 2 wins . (Tie)
- Star Academy 5:Mirhan Hussien (Egypt)- 2 wins. (Tie)
- Star Academy 6: Lara Scandar (Egypt)- 3 wins. (Tie)
- Star Academy 6: Mohammad Serag (Egypt)- 3 wins. (Tie)
- Star Academy 7: Tahra (Morocco)- 5 wins; More than any contestant in Star Academy history. (Tie)
- Star Academy 8: Abdelsalam Mohamed (Kuwait) – 4 wins. (Tie)
- Star Academy 8: Ahmed Ezzat (Egypt) – 4 wins. (Tie)
- Star Academy 8: Karim Kamel (Egypt) – 3 wins. (Tie)
- Star Academy 9: Taher Mostafa (Egypt) – 2 wins. (Tie)
- Star Academy 9: Rana Samaha (Egypt) – 2 wins. (Tie)
- Star Academy 9: Soukaina Boukries (Morocco) – 2 wins. (Tie)
- Star Academy 10: Abdelsalam Alzayid (Kuwait) – 4 wins. (Tie)
- Star Academy 11: Hanane El Khader (Morocco) – 3 wins . (Tie)
- Star Academy 11: Raphael Jabbour (Lebanon) – 3 wins. (Tie)

Most nominated contestants' wins by Students votes:
- Star Academy 1: Mira Mikhail (Lebanon)- 2 wins. (Tie)
- Star Academy 4: Nelly Ma3to2 (Lebanon)- 3 wins. (Tie)
- Star Academy 5: Zaher Saleh (Palestine)- 3 wins. (Tie)
- Star Academy 5: Amal el Ma7lawy (Tunisia)- 3 wins. (Tie)
- Star Academy 6: Yehia Soweis (Jordan)- 4 wins; More than any contestant in Star Academy history.
- Star Academy 8: Layan Bazlamit (Palestine)- 3 wins. (Tie)
- Star Academy 9: Nour Farawati (Syria)- 3 wins. (Tie)

Highest percentage of public votes ever achieved by each season:
Star Academy 1: Bashar Shatti (Kuwait): 78.20%
Star Academy 2: Hisham Abdulrahman (KSA): 85.04%
Star Academy 3: Fady Andraos (Palestine): 67.08%
Star Academy 4: Abdul Aziz-Alaswad (Kuwait): 64.25%
Star Academy 5: Abdallah El Dossari (KSA) : 75.46%
Star Academy 6: Lara scandar (Egypt): 64.91%
Star Academy 7: Rahma Riad (Iraq): 69.96%
Star Academy 8: Ahmed Ezzat (Egypt): 81.88%
Star Academy 9: Soukaina Boukries (Morocco): 77.31%
Star Academy 10: Ibtissam Tiskat (Morocco): 75.84%
Star Academy 11: Raphael Jabbour (Lebanon): 70.76%

Contestants that left from first nomination:
-Star Academy 1:
. Nisrine (Lebanon)
. Youssef (UAE)
. Leila (Lebanon)
. Myriam (Syria)
. Cynthya (Lebanon)
. Baha2 (Tunisia)
-Star Academy 2:
. Randa (Egypt)
. Hanan (Morocco)
. Joy (Syria)
. ZeeZee Adel (Egypt)
-Star Academy 3:
. Jihan (Morocco)
. Shadya (Morocco)
. Marwa (Egypt)
. Rokaya (Egypt)
-Star Academy 4:
. Khaled (Bahrain)
. Entesar (Tunisia)
. Tina (Lebanon)
-Star Academy 5:
. Omar (Iraq)
. Fawaz (Kuwait)
. Mostafa (Lebanon)
. Shahinaz (Egypt)
-Star Academy 6:
. Jaber (Bahrain)
. Meteb (Saudi Arabia)
. Diala (Palestine)
. Aya (Egypt)
-Star Academy 7:
. Jack (Lebanon)
. Haitham (Saudi Arabia)
. Rayan (Lebanon)
. Ramy (Lebanon)
-Star Academy 8:
. Mohamed Q. (Jordan)
. Lamya (Tunisia)
. Yasmine (Morocco)
. Mohamed Raf. (Jordan)
. Efram (Lebanon)
. Oumayma (Tunisia)
-Star Academy 9:
. Marita (Lebanon)
. Menna (Egypt)
-Star Academy 10:
. Ichraq Qamar (Tunisia)
. Rita (Lebanon)
-Star Academy 11:
. Youssef (Syria)
. Murtada (Iraq)
. Ihab (Morocco)

Contestants that eventually signed with Rotana:

- Star Academy 1: 2nd place: Bashar Al Shatti Kuwait : After his second studio album, he withdrew from the company, due to the lack of care and promotion on his claim. He is currently with ARM.
- Star Academy 2: Winner: Hisham Abdulrahman Saudi Arabia, He had a movie produced by the company titled Kaif Al Hal, and a duet released with Mais Hamdan.
- Star Academy 2: 2nd place: Amani Swaissi Tunisia, Left Rotana in 2009 and joined Melody.
- Star Academy 2: 3rd place: ZeeZee Adel Egypt : The most successful candidate from all the graduates, she has signed the most valuable contract which included 5 albums, 3–4 music videos each and a single release anytime she chooses, ZeeZee's debut album and her second album have enjoyed high commercial success.
- Star Academy 2: 4th place: Ahmad Hussain Kuwait : His debut album hasn't enjoyed much success, as he focused on his acting career, even though he just released his second album.
- Star Academy 2: 5th place: Bashar Ghazawi Jordan : Had signed a contract in which he and 3 other candidates from the same season would share an album with each of them having 2 singles in it.
- Star Academy 2: 6th place: Katya Haraky Lebanon :Had signed a contract in which she and 3 other candidates from the same season would share an album with each of them having 2 singles in it.
- Star Academy 2: 7th place: Samer Domat Lebanon : Had signed a contract in which he and 3 other candidates from the same season would share an album with each of them having 2 singles in it.
- Star Academy 2: 8th place: Salma Ghazali Algeria : Had signed a contract in which she and 3 other candidates from the same season would share an album with each of them having 2 singles in it. She's the only one out of the 4 that shared an album altogether, that eventually got signed by the company for a solo album.
- Star Academy 2: 12th place: Bashar Kaisi Iraq : He was signed as a presenter of Khaleeji chart show that ran for a year in 2007.
- Star Academy 3: 3rd place: Hana'a Idresy Morocco : She announced on various interviews that she signed a contract with the company which she's currently preparing for, as part of a series of albums.
- Star Academy 3: 4th place: Chayma Hilali Tunisia : She released a duet with Lebanese singer Assi Hilani which was produced by the company, though her current status with the company is unknown.
- Star Academy 5: 5th place: Abdullah Al-Dosery Saudi Arabia : He announced, in January 2009, that he signed a contract with the company to produce 5 albums.
- Star Academy 5: 9th place: Amel Bshousha Algeria : Amal has agreed to host the most important chart show in the Arab World which aired for 3 consecutive months then stopped. Her current status is unknown.
- Star Academy 5: 11th place: Bader Saudi Arabia : He signed a contract in which he only had one single produced by the company without a music video to promote it.
- Star Academy 5: 15th place: Khalid Bu Sakher Kuwait : He signed a contract which only had one single produced by the company without a music video to promote it.

== Countries ==
Country	Titles	Year(s)
Egypt	4	Star Academy 1, Star Academy 8, Star Academy 9, Star Academy 10
Lebanon	2	Star Academy 3, Star Academy 11
KSA	2	Star Academy 2, Star Academy 6
Syria	1	Star Academy 7
Tunisia	1	Star Academy 5
Iraq	1	Star Academy 4

== Sources ==
- Kraidy, Marwan (2009a). Reality Television and Arab Politics. Cambridge, UK: Cambridge University Press. ISBN 9780521749046.
- Kraidy, Marwan (2009b). "Reality Television, Gender, and Authenticity in Saudi Arabia". The Journal of Communication. 59 (2): 345–366. doi:10.1111/j.1460-2466.2009.01419.x. Archived from the original on 26 September 2015.
