= Rassi =

Rassi may refer to:

== People ==
=== Surname ===
- Abdullah Rassi, Lebanese politician
- Georges Al Rassi, Lebanese musician
- Karim Rassi, Lebanese politician
- Mazdack Rassi, Iranian entrepreneur
- Nadine Al Rassi, Lebanese actress
- Al-Qasim al-Rassi, Arab religious figure
- Zanna Roberts Rassi, British journalist and businesswoman

=== Given name ===
- Rassi Nashalik, Canadian journalist

== Places ==
- Rassi, Estonia

== See also ==
- Rassie Erasmus, South African rugby union coach and former player
- Rassie van der Dussen, South African cricketer
- Rassid dynasty, former Zaidi rulers of Yemen
