= Fadi Haddad =

- Born: December 21, 1974 (age 51); Dhour El Choueir, Lebanon
- Occupation: Director
- Years active: 1992 - present
- Notable work: Mharaja (2018), Meheret (2021)
- Spouse: Carole Samaha (m. 2009)
- Children: 3

Fadi Haddad (born 21 December 1974) Lebanese music video and movies director who works with the biggest music studios in Lebanon and the Arab world such as Rotana Group and Lifestylez, and have worked with many famous Arab singers such as George Wassouf, Walid Toufic, Abdallah Al Rowaished Rami Ayach, Majid Al Mohandis, Saber Rebaï, Nancy Ajram, Diana Haddad, Assi Hellani, Najwa Karam, Fares Karam, Mayada El Hennawy, Nawal Al Zoghbi, Dina Hayek, Yara and Wael Jassar. Additionally, he worked on TV commercials for Lebanon and the Arab world for international Brands such as Samsung and MAC cosmetics. He also directed many films such as Mahraja in 2018 and "Meheret" in 2021. In 2007, he launched his own Production house Retina Films and became the first director to have his own film equipment and offer full production services and shooting studios for music videos, TV commercials and films.

== Personal life ==
Since December 2009, he has been married to Carole Samaha, and he has three sons with her. He settled in Dhour El Choueir in Mount Lebanon Governorate.

== Work Life ==
Fadi Haddad entered the world of Film and Television in his early twenties, he started in 1992 as a Director of Photography until he got his big break in 2004, directing his first ever music video for Najwa Karam. Since then he went on to direct music videos for the Biggest artists in Lebanon and the Arab world such as George Wassouf, Walid Toufic, Rami Ayach, Nancy Ajram, Diana Haddad, Assi Hellani, Najwa Karam, Fares Karam, Mayada El Hennawy, Nawal Al Zoghbi, Dina Hayek, Yara and Wael Jassar. Additionally, he worked on many TV Commercials for international brands such as Samsung and MAC cosmetics In Lebanon, Gulf and Egypt. In 2007, he became the first Arab director to have his own Production House "Retina Films" that owns all cinematic film equipment and provides all production services and big professional shooting studios for music videos, TV commercials and films. In 2017 he directed his first feature film "The Maharaja" starring Ziad Bourji and then directed his latest film "Meheret" in 2021 that explores the life of an Ethiopian lady living and working in Lebanon during the Lebanese revolution and the bombing of the port in Beirut in August 4. Both his films have received wide positive criticism from both critics and the audience.

Year	Name	Type	work
2017	Amir El Leil	TV series	Director
2018	Mahraja	Feature film	Director
2019	Heek menghani	TV show	Director
2019	The third river	TV show	Director
2021	Meheret	Feature film	Director

=== Music videos ===
Year	Song	Artist
2008	Batmana (بتمنى)	Naya
2008	Mahdoum ( مهضوم)	Mayssam Nahas
2008	Resala lel 3alam (رسالة للعالم)	Nancy Ajram
2009	Al Ghorba (الغربة)	Fares Karam
2010	Law Ma Btikzob (لو مابتكذب)	Najwa Karam
2010	Ghareba (غريبة)	Wael Jassar
2010	Shayfak Oudami (شايفاك قدامى)	Rola Saad
2011	La Aouyounak Habibi (لعيونك حبيبي)	Georges Al Rassi
2011	Kalemni Asma3lak (كلمني أسمعلك)	Madeleine Matar
2011	Dal'ouna (دلعونا)	Alaa Zalzali
2011	Ola la (أولا لا)	Kamar
2012	Ya Kel El Deni (يا كل الدني)	Joseph Attieh
2012	Ma Aad Bade Eyak (ماعاد بدي ياك)	Melhem Zein
2013	ERBIL (اربيل)	Samira Said
2013	Weddi Bi Khabar (ودي بخبر)	Yara
2013	Lash7ad Hobak (لشحد حبك)	Najwa Karam
2013	Mousiba (مصيبة)	Assi El Hallani
2014	Kurdistan motin El Abtal (كردستان)	Mayada El Hennawy
2014	Ajeel (أجيك)	Yara
2014	Ma Aw'edak (ما اوعدك)	Nancy Ajram
2014	Tesalni (تسألني)	Majid al-Muhandis
2014	Mennak La Allah (منك ل الله)	Rida
2014	Kesh malak (كش ملك)	Saber Rebaï
2014	Wala youm (ولا يوم)	Melissa
2015	3al Sakhra (عالصخرة)	Najwa Karam
2015	Yala Nor2os (يلا نرقص)	Ramy Ayach
2015	Yoh Yoh (يوه يوه)	Sabine
2015	Ya Bashar (يا بشر)	Diana Haddad
2015	W Bkoun Jayi Wadeaak (وبكون جايي ودّعك)	Nancy Ajram
2016	La Abed Aadi (لا أبد عادي )	Majid al-Muhandis
2016	zhgana Malet (زهقانة مليت)	Shams
2016	Kteer Bjin Aleik (كتير بجن عليك)	Rola Saad
2016	Bosa abl alnawm (بوسة قبل النوم)	Najwa Karam
2017	Habebi men (حبيبي مين)	Najwa Karam
2018	Waqool Ansaak (وقول انساك)	Arwa
2018	Fresh (فريش)	Latifa
2018	Am doob (عم دوب)	Dina Hayek
2018	Bos (بص)	Hend
2019	Sakaker El Sokar (سكاكر السكر)	Ramy Ayach ft. Fifi Abdou
2019	La Ouyounak El Helwin (لعيونك الحلوين)	Ziad Bourji
2019	Krahni (كرهني)	Elissa
