= Celebrity Duets Arab World =

Lebanese reality television show

- Arabic: ديو المشاهير
- Directed by: Kamil Tanios
- Presented by: Annabella Hilal
- Country of origin: Lebanon
- No. of seasons: 6

Production
- Executive producer: Nay Naffaa

Original release
- Network: LBCI
- Release: October 22, 2010 – 2014
- Network: MBC 1
- Release: 2015 – 2015
- Network: MTV Lebanon
- Release: 2015 – present

Celebrity Duets is the Arabic version of the American program Celebrity Duets, where Arab’s most prominent professional singers team up with 13 non-singing celebrities from different backgrounds, in front of a live studio audience, a panel of judges, and viewers who get to vote them off, in a weekly elimination competition.

A panel of judges will give their opinion after each performance, although the final call on who remains in the running is the audience's, through SMS voting.

The prize money earned at the end of each episode will be donated to a charity selected by the leaving contestant.

== Season 1 ==
Lebanese actress Nadine Al Rassi reached the finale and won the grand prize, which she donated to the Lebanese Red Cross. The second finalist of the show was Egyptian actor Amir Karrara who won the second prize in which he donated to the Children's Cancer Hospital 57357 in Egypt.

=== Contestants ===
- Amir Karrara - Actor
- Christina Sawaya - Miss Lebanon 2001
- Georges Assaf - Sports trainer
- Jenny Esper - Actress
- Mohamad Dagher - Fashion designer
- Nadine Al Rassi - Actress
- Chef Ramzi - Cook
- Youmna Cherry - Presenter

=== Duet Partners ===
- Ahmed Al Shereef
- Aline Lahoud
- Amr Youssef
- Carole Samaha
- Fady Andrawos
- Fares Karam
- Georges El Rassi
- Hossam Habeeb
- Joseph Attieh
- Melhem Zein
- Miral Faisal
- Mohammad Bash
- Myriam Fares
- Nabil Shouail
- Rayan Eid
- Rouweida El Mahroug
- Samira Saeid
- Shereen Abdel Wahab
- Sofia El Marikh
- Wadih El Safi
- Yara Sbini

=== Judges ===
- Joumana Haddad
- Oussama Rahbani
- Romeo Lahoud

== Season 2 ==
Lebanese actress Maguy Bou Ghosn and Lebanese actor Carlos Azar battled in the finale episode for the grand prize. Maguy Bou Ghosn won and donated her prize to St. Jude Children Cancer Center.

=== Contestants ===
- Maguy Bou Ghosn - Actress
- Carlos Azar - Actor
- Tarek Abou Jaoude - Music Composer
- Omar al-Dini - Comedian
- Seif el-Dine el-Sbei - Actor and Director
- Pamela el-Kik - Actress
- Hiba al-Abassiri - Journalist
- Habib el-Habib - Actor
- Mirna Khayat - Director
- Dima al-Jundi - Actress
- Mayssoun al-Rouwaily - Actress

=== Duet Partners ===
- Abdallah Bel Kheir
- Arwa
- Assi el-Helani
- Carole Samaha
- Fady Andarous
- Ghadi
- Gilbert Simon
- Haifa Wehbe
- Issam Karika
- Joseph Attieh
- Kazem el-Saher
- Marwan Khoury
- Melhem Zein
- Mohammad Iskandar
- Mouein Shreif
- Myrian Fraes
- Nabil Cheil
- Oumaima Taleb
- Rouwaida Attieh
- Saad Ramadan
- Saber el-Roubai
- Samira Said
- Sara Farah
- Sherine Abdel Wahab
- Sofia Marikh
- Wadih el-Safi
- Zeina Aftimos

=== Judges ===
- Abdallah Bel Kheir
- Oussama Rahbani
- Romeo Lahoud

== Season 3 ==
Lebanese actor and TV presenter Tony Abu Jawdeh won and donated his prize to Les Petits Souliers.

=== Contestants ===
- Tony Abu Jawdeh - Actor and TV presenter
- Adel Hakki - Actor
- Mario Bassil - Comedian
- Carine Rizcallah - Actress
- Jessy Abdo - Actress
- Maged El Masry - Actor
- Carolina de Oliveira - Actress and TV presenter
- Richard Khoury - Chef
- Samar Yousry - TV presenter
- Ziad Al-Samad - Football player
- Ward al-Khal - Actress
- Merna al-Mohandes - Actress

=== Judges ===
- Hasan El-Raddad
- Oussama Rahbani
- Romeo Lahoud

== Season 4 ==
Lebanese actor Tony Issa won and donated his prize to Kids First Association.

=== Contestants ===
- Loreen Kodeih - Actress
- Sana Naser - TV presenter
- Joy Karam - Singer
- Roula Chamieh - Actress
- Shoukran Mortaja - Actress
- Cynthia Khalifa - Actress and TV presenter
- Antoine Al-Hajj - Chef
- Moez Toumi - Actor
- Tony Issa - Actor
- Michel Azzi - TV presenter
- Wessam Saleeba - Singer and actor
- Bassem Yakhour - Actor
- Eduard - Actor and singer

=== Judges ===
- Oussama Rahbani
- Tarek Abou Jaoude
- Mona Abou Hamze

== Season 5 ==
Lebanese actress Dalida Khalil won and donated her prize to North Autism Center.

=== Contestants ===
- Dalida Khalil - Actress
- Jerry Ghazal - Actor
- Oweiss Mkhallalati - Actor
- Misbah Ahdab - Politician
- Sandra Rizk - Actress
- Fady Charbel - Comedian
- Arza Shadyak - TV presenter
- Talal Jurdi - Actor
- Pierre Chammassian - Comedian
- Randa Sarkis - TV presenter
- Douja Hijazi - Actress
- Raja Nasser Eldine - TV presenter
- Sacha Dahdouh - Actress and TV presenter

=== Judges ===
- Simon Asmar
- Oussama Rahbani
- Mona Abou Hamze

== Season 6 ==
Lebanese singer Alwalid Hallani won and donated his prize to fight PID.

=== Contestants ===
- Valerie Abou Chacra - Actress and Miss Lebanon 2015
- Abbas Jaafar - Actor
- Aline Broummana - TV Presenter
- Alwalid Hallani - Singer
- Dolly Ayash - Actress and TV presenter
- Layla Abdel Latif - Astrologer
- Liliane Nemri - Actress
- Melhem Riachy - Author
- Nady Abou Chabke - Comedian
- Saad Hamdan - Actor
- Sara Abi Kanaan - Actress
- Tony Baroud - TV presenter
- Vera Yammine - Politician

=== Judges ===
- Simon Asmar
- Oussama Rahbani
- Mona Abou Hamze

== Versions ==
Country	Name	Host	Network	Date premiered
United States of America	Celebrity Duets	Wayne Brady	Fox	August 29, 2006
(Arab League) Arab world	ديو المشاهير; Duo El Mashahir	Dina Azar (Season 1–2); Hilda Khalife (Season 3); Annabella Hilal (Season 4–6)	LBC (Seasons 1–3); MBC 1 (Season 4); MTV (Season 4–6)	October 22, 2010
Jordan	Celebrity Duets Jordan	Mona Omari	Channel 1 Jordan	January 7, 2021
Philippines	Celebrity Duets Philippine Edition	Ogie Alcasid and Regine Velasquez	GMA Network	August 11, 2007
