= Till Death =

Till Death may refer to:

- Till Death..., an ITV sitcom
- Till Death (Lebanese TV series), a Lebanese drama
- Till Death (film), a 2021 film starring Megan Fox
- South of Heaven (film), originally titled Till Death, starring Jason Sudeikis and Evangeline Lilly

== See also ==
- Till Death: Azalea's Wrath, a 2019 Malaysian Malay-language film
- Till Death Do Us Part (disambiguation)
- Til Death (disambiguation)
