= Mayada =

Mayada is the given name of

- Mayada El Hennawy (born 1959), Syrian and pan-Arab singer
- Mayada Al-Sayad (born 1992), German-Palestinian marathon runner
- Mayada Swar Aldahab, Sudanese politician

Mayada is the family name of

- Camilo Mayada (born 1991), Uruguayan footballer
