= Til Death =

Til Death may refer to:

- Til death, a portion of the English-language Christian marriage vows
- Til Death (album), a 1998 album by The Undead
- 'Til Death (album), a 2012 album by Capture the Crown
- Til Death, an album by Aesthetic Perfection
- Til Death (song), a 2011 song by Wynter Gordon
- 'Til Death, an American sitcom
- Till Death..., a British sitcom
- " 'Til Death" (Person of Interest), an episode of the American television drama series Person of Interest
- Till Death (Lebanese TV series), a Lebanese television drama
- Till Death (film), a 2021 American action thriller film

== See also ==
- Til Death Do Us Part (disambiguation)
- Till Death (disambiguation)
