= List of Jordanian films =

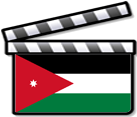

This is an alphabetised list of Films produced in Jordan.

Title	Year	Director	Cast	Genre	Notes
A
Abraham's Odyssey	1998	Yehuda Yaniv		Documentary	
B
Born of War	2014	Vicky Jewson		Action	
C
Captain Abu Raed	2008	Amin Matalqa	Nadim Sawalha, Rana Sultan	Drama	Jordanian submission to the 81st Academy Awards for Best Foreign Language Film
Cherkess	2010	Mohy Quandour		Drama	Motion Picture Winner best film of 2010 The Angel Film Award at Monaco International Film Festival as well as six other awards for Best Director, Best Producer, Best Screenplay, Best Supporting Actor, and Best New Talent.
The Cut	2014	Fatih Akın		Drama	
G
Growing Up in Amman's Suburbia	2006	Hazim Bitar			9-minute short
H
High Heels	2009	Fadi G. Haddad	Mouna Moussa, Lara Sawalha	Black Comedy	19-minute short - Best Jordanian Short Film 2009
Hind Under Siege	2025	Naji Salameh	Elina Askar, Sofia Asir	Biographical war drama	24-minute short – Won the Jury Award for Best Narrative Short Film at the 2025 Gaza International Festival for Women's Cinema.
I
Into the Belly of the Whale	2010	Hazim Bitar			24-minute - Official Selection IDFA 2010, Clermont-Ferrand International Short Film Festival 2011, Tampere Film Festival 2011
K
Kajaki	2014	Paul Katis		War; Thriller	
al-Khourouj 67	1968				
M
Missing	2010	Tariq Rimawi		Animation	3-minute short animated film, Best Jordanian Short Film 2010 https://web.archive.org/web/20180422231218/http://www.missingshortfilm.com/
O
Overdose	2005	Ammar Quttaineh		Comedy	12-minute short
Q
Quelques miettes pour les oiseaux	2005			Documentary	28-minute short
S
The Savior	2014	Robert Savo		Biography	
Sera fe Jarash	1956			Drama	70-minute
Sharar	2006	Hazim Bitar, Ammar Quttaineh, Saleh Qasem			17-minute short - Official Selection Clermont-Ferrand Int'l Short Film Festival, Locarno Int'l Film Festival
T
Theeb	2014	Naji Abu Nowar	Jacir Eid Al-Hwietat, Hussein Salameh Al-Sweilhiyeen, Hassan Mutlag Al-Maraiyeh, Jack Fox	Drama	100-minute feature film. Won Best Director in the Orizzonti (New Horizons) category in the 71st Venice International Film Festival. The Belgrade Victor and Best Script at 43rd Belgrade International Film Festival.
Thunderlust (and the Middle Beast)	2014	Steve Pratt		Comedy	Australia-Jordan coproduction
U
Undying Dreams	2014	Ash Kohan		Action	
W
Watani habibi	1964				
When Monaliza Smiled	2012	Fadi G. Haddad	Tahani Salim, Shady Khalaf, Haifa Al-Agha, Nadera Omran, Fuad Shomali, Haider Kfouf, Suha Najjar	Comedy, Romance	95 minute feature film.; Nominated for best feature film (Muhr Arab Award) at the Dubai International Film Festival.; Won the Journalist award and the award for Best Actress (Tahani Salim) at the International Arab Film Festival in Oran, Algeria.
V
View, The	2008	Hazim Bitar and Rifqi Assaf	Rabee Zureikat, Kian Hattar	Drama	Winner of Best Short Film at the Abu Dhabi International Film Festival ($75000)
Dajjal: The Slayer and His Followers	2018	Rana Abrar	3D Characters	Action, Animated, Adventure	
