= Dalida Khalil =

Lebanese actress and singer (born 1988)

- داليدا خليل
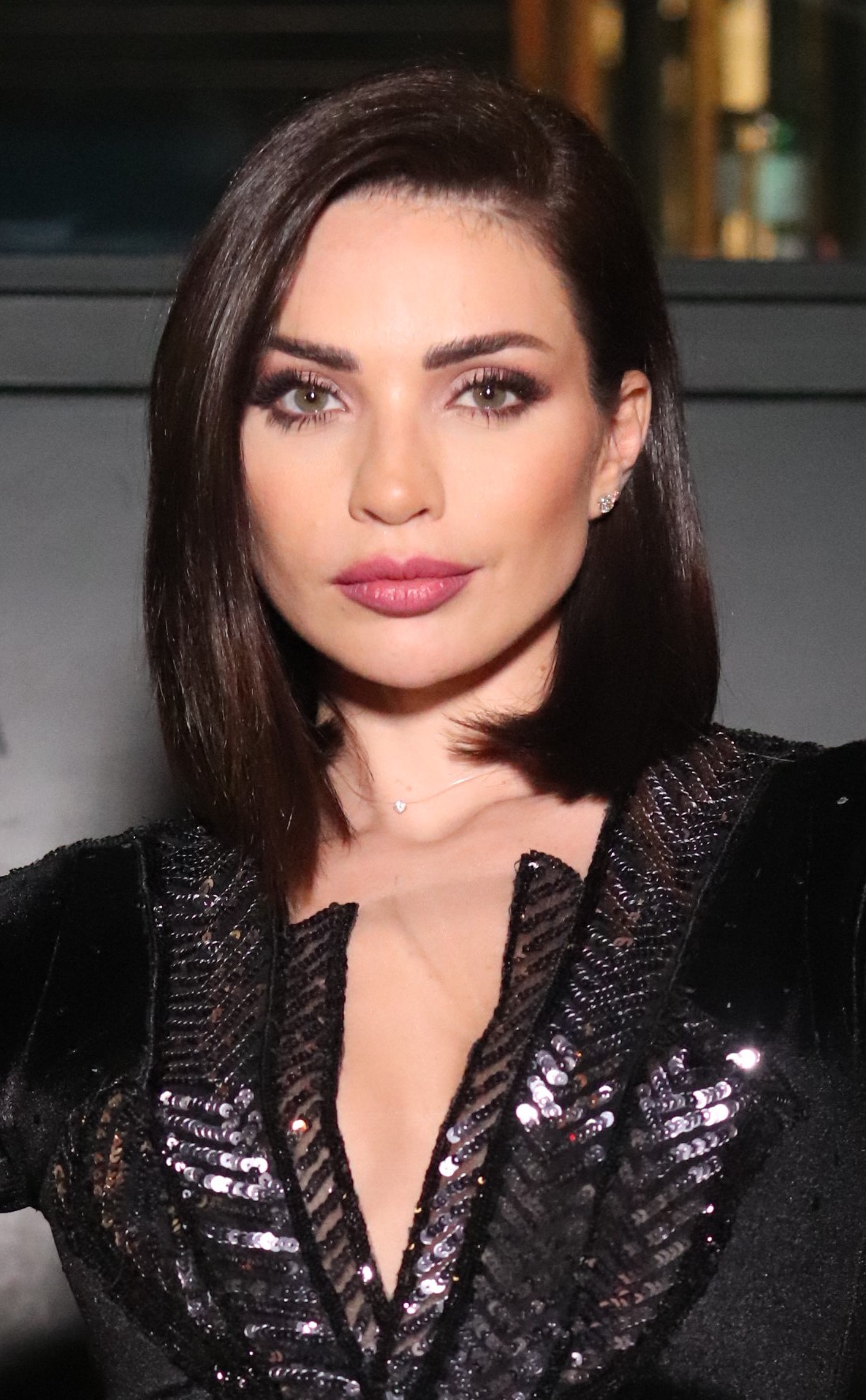
- Born: Dalida Antoine Khalil; 16 February 1988 (age 38); Mazra'et El Nahr, Lebanon
- Other name: Miss North
- Education: Lebanese University (Acting and Directing)
- Occupations: Actress, singer
- Years active: 2007–present
- Known for: Serr, Helwe W Kezzabe, Amir El Leil
- Height: 1.65 m (5 ft 5 in)
- Awards: Murex d'Or

Dalida Antoine Khalil (Arabic: داليدا أنطوان خليل; born 16 February 1988) is a Lebanese Actor and singer. Her acting career started in 2007 when she participated in a Lebanese series called Fifty-Fifty. Since then, she has performed in more than twenty series. She received the Murex d'Or Award for Best Rising Actress in 2012. She would later star a musical career and release her debut single "Wardi W Wardi" in 2018.

== Personal life ==
Dalida Khalil was born in Mazra'et El Nahr, Zgharta District of North Lebanon, and is the niece of the Lebanese singer Laura Khalil. She graduated with an Acting and Directing degree from the Academy of Arts in the Lebanese University.

== Career ==
Her career began in 2006 in the Fifty Fifty series written by Nabil Assaf and Giscard Lahoud and directed by Elie ghorayeb. After that, Khalil participated in many series such as Al Ta’er Al Maksour (The Broken Bird) in 2008, Souad and Nouhad in 2009, Li’annaho Al Hob (Because of Love) in 2009, Maitre Nada in 2009 written by Samia Chemaly, directed by Ghada D. Akl and produced by Marwa Group, Ajyal in 2010 written by Claudia Marchelian and directed by Philip Asmar, Dakkit Aleb in 2010, Zikra in 2011, Awwal Marra (The First Time) in 2012, Helwe W Kezzabe (Beautiful Liar) in 2012 written by Carine Rizcallah and directed by Saif al-Sheikh Najib, Al ‘Ishk Al Majnoun (The Crazy Love) in 2013, Habib Mira in 2014 written by Claude Saliba and directed by Cesar Hajj Khalil, and Dawa’er Hob (The Circles of Love) in 2015 written by Sawsan Kabsi and Mahmoud Dasouki and directed by Eyad Al Kzouz.

Dalida Khalil was also the guest of honor in the series Al- ‘Arrab (The Godfather) along with the singer Assi El Hellani. The series was written by Hazem Sleiman and directed by Muthna Sobh and was showing during Ramadan 2015.

Moreover, Dalida Khalil acted with Ramy Ayach in series Amir El Leil in 2016–2017. The series was written by Mona Tayeh, directed first by Fadi Haddad then by Elie Berbary.

Dalida Khalil also participated and was first runner up in the show Dancing with the Stars in its 3rd season with the Syrian dancer Abdo Dalloul and was able to reach the finals where she competed with her singer colleague Anthony Touma who ended up winning the trophy.

Khalil won the Arabic version of Celebrity Duets in 2018 after competing with 12 other celebrities. North Autism Center was the NGO that Khalil chose, who received the final winner prize which is an amount of $30,000.

== Television series ==
1. Al-Hall Bi Idak directed by Samir Habchi
2. Al-Taghiya written by Marwan Najjar
3. Fifty Fifty (2007), worked with Nabil Assaf and Jeskar Lahoud – directed by Elie Ghrayeb
4. Al Ta2er l Maksour (2008), Worked with Ward l Khal and Youssef l Khal – directed by Miled Abi Raad
5. Daet Alb (main role) directed by Elie Feghaly
6. Liannaho Al Hob (2009) (main role) directed by Elie Feghaly
7. Madame Karmen (2009) (main role) directed by Philippe Asmar
8. Ajyal (2010) (main role as Mira) directed by Philippe Asmar
9. Ekher khabar (2011) (main role) directed by Hisham Sherbatji
10. Zekra (2011) (main role as Lyn) directed by Elie F.Habib
11. Auberge (2011) (main role) directed by Asad Foladka
12. Maitre Nada (2010) (main role) written by Samia Chemaly, directed by Ghada D. Akl and produced by Marwa Group.
13. Awal marra (2013) (main role as Jana) directed by Philip Asmar
14. Al Tabanni (2012) (main role) from alhayat drama, directed by Nabil Lebbos
15. Al Mousakana (2012) (main role) from al hayat drama, directed by Zeina Al Sabea
16. Helwe w Kezzebe (2012) (main role as Dalida) with ziad borji, directed by Seif Sheikh Najib
17. Al 3oshek l Majnoun (2013) (main role as Yasmine) directed by Zouhair Ahmad Kannou3
18. Al 'Arrab (2015) with singer Assi El Hellani written by Hazem Sleiman and directed by Muthna Sobh
19. Habib Mira (2014) (main role as Mira) directed by Seif Cheikh Najib
20. Dawaer Hob (2014–15) (main role as Nour) directed by Iyad Al Khzouz
21. Amir El Leil (2016) (main role as Farah) with pop star Ramy Ayach, directed by Fadi Haddad & Elie Berbery
22. Sakat El Waraa (2018) (main role as Lynn) directed by Nadim Mhanna and written by Marwan Najjar
23. 50 Alef (50 Thousand) (2017–18) (main role as Mia) directed by David Oryan and written by Aya Tiba
24. Ser (2020) (main role as Taline) Directed by Marwan Barakat.
25. Paranoia (2021) (Guest of Honor as Maya) – with Kosai Khauli, directed by Ousama Obeid, Sabbah Production.
26. Buyut Men Warak (2022) (main role as Haya) – with Youssef Al Khal, written by Aya Tiba, directed by Ousama Shehab Alhamad.

== Musical career ==
On September 6, 2018, Khalil released her debut single, Wardi W Wardi . Written by Nizar Francis, composed by Michel Fadel, and the music video directed by Ziad Khoury. The music video reached more than 700K viewers within the first week of its release.

On November 16, 2020, Khalil released her second single, Chic Awi, written by Oussama Mehrez, composed by Mohamed Yehya and the music video directed by Pierre Khadra. The music video reached half a million views within the first week of its release.

On December 2, 2021, Khalil released her third single, Moody Aali, written by Kamala Jalal Kheirbeik, composed by Youssef Erraji & Squa Lee & Baddy, and the music video directed by Pierre Khadra.

== Cinema ==
- Helwe Ktir W Kezzabe – حلوة كتير وكذابي, a sequel to her series Helwe W Kezzabe that was previously aired on MTV Lebanon. It was written by Carine Rizkallah and directed by Seif Sheikh Najib. It tells the story of a girl (Dalida Khalil) who adores lying and then falls in love with the famous singer Ramzi Deeb (Ziad Bourji).
- Minak Inta – مينك إنت , another sequel film to her series Sakata Alwarak -سكت الورق that was previously aired on MTV Lebanon. It was written by Marwan Najjar and directed by Nadim Mhanna.
- Maharaja – المهراجا. Khalil and Ziad Bourji reunited in another romantic comedy movie that was released in all theaters at Christmas 2018. The film was written by Rafi Wehbi, and directed by Fadi Haddad. This movie was a huge success that it also got premiered in Egypt and Saudi Arabia.
- Ba’ed El Khamis (After Thursday) -بعد الخميس, an Arabic movie that Khalil also participated in, it gathered very known actors from Egypt, Saudi Arabia, and the Emirates such as Mohamad El Hashem, Tal'at Zakaria, and Ali Al Tamimi. Written by Bassam Ali, Directed by Haydar Al Nasser.

== Awards ==
Year	Awards	Category	Nominated work	Result
2012	Murex d'Or	Best Rising Actress	Herself	Won
2020	Arab Star Festival	Best Rising Singer	Herself	Won
2021	Los Angeles Film Awards	Best Music Video	Chic Awi	Won
2021	Los Angeles Film Awards	Best Picture	Chic Awi	Won
