= Twassa Feyi =

Studio album by Yara
- Released: October 2005
- Recorded: 2004–2005
- Genre: Pop
- Label: Melody Music, EMI Arabia
- Producer: Tarek Abou Jaoudeh

Yara chronology
| Twassa Feyi (2005) | Enta Menni (2008) |

Singles from Twassa Feyi J
- 1. "Hob Kbeer March 16, 2005"; 2. "Twassa Feyi July 21, 2005"

Twassa Feyi is the debut album of Lebanese artist Yara and was produced and composed by the man who introduced her into the music industry Tarek Abou Jaoudeh in 2005. Tarek composed her first single, "Hob Kbir", for her and it met with relative success. The album has songs in the Egyptian and Lebanese Arabic dialects.

== Track listing ==
1. "Bala Eshq" 4:00
2. "Law Basseli (Gayya We Eidi Ala Albi)" 4:01
3. "W Ana Janbak"
4. "Hob Kbeer" 4:33
5. "Lamma Tettalla" 3:28
6. "Twassa Feyi" 3:24
7. "Nseetni Zaman" 4:41
8. "Alf Zayyak" 4:33
9. "Ayam" 4:14

== Credits ==
- Mohamed Moustafa, arranger
- Khaled Ezz, arranger
- Hadi Sharara, arranger, engineer
- Ziad Boutros, arranger, engineer
- Tarek Abou Jaoudeh, composer, producer
