= Mona Abou Hamze =

Lebanese TV personality and presenter

- Born: Mona Abu Alwan; October 2, 1972 (age 53); Barouk, Lebanon
- Occupation: TV Presenter
- Employer: MTV Lebanon
- Spouse: Bahij Abou Hamze
- Website: https://monagazine.com/

Mona Abou Hamze (Arabic: منى أبو حمزة) (née Abu Alwan; October 2, 1972) is a Lebanese TV personality and presenter, born in Barouk into a Lebanese Druze family. She is best known for hosting the Lebanese show Talk of the Town on MTV since April 2009, where she has had over 2000 guests, from different backgrounds and cultures.

== Career ==
She was a jury member on Mouzii el Arab, the only Pan-Arab TV show solely dedicated to choosing future TV presenters, which first aired in 2015 on Abu Dhabi TV and Al Hayat TV station.

Abou Hamze is also a member of the Jury of Celebrity Duets (Arabic version) which is broadcast on MTV and MBC, working alongside musicians Oussama Rahbani and Tarek Abou Jaoude, then Simon Asmar.

== Awards ==
She received the Murex d'Or award in 2009 for Talk of the Town. Abou Hamze won the Melody Award for Best Presenter for 3 consecutive years, from 2009 to 2011 (until the station, Melody Lebanon was closed down); as well as the Zahret Al Khaleej Award, for the Best Arab Presenter in 2011.

In 2012 Abou Hamze was recognized as one of the ‘100 Most Powerful Arab Women’ in 2012 by CEO Middle East magazine. In 2013 she was the first Arab presenter to be officially invited to the Cannes Film Festival.

== Personal life ==
She is married to Bahij Abou Hamze, with whom she has two sons and one daughter. They both currently live in Beirut. Her husband was held under suspicion in 2014, following a lawsuit complaint by Walid Jumblatt then eventually released in 2017 with no charges filed. Mona is a Druze.

== Publications ==
Abou Hamze is the author of Bila Hakaeb, a book of poetry.Arabic: بلا حقائب, lit. 'Without Bags').

== See also ==
- List of Druze
