= Yasser Al-Masri =

Kuwaiti-born Jordanian-Palestinian actor (1970–2018)

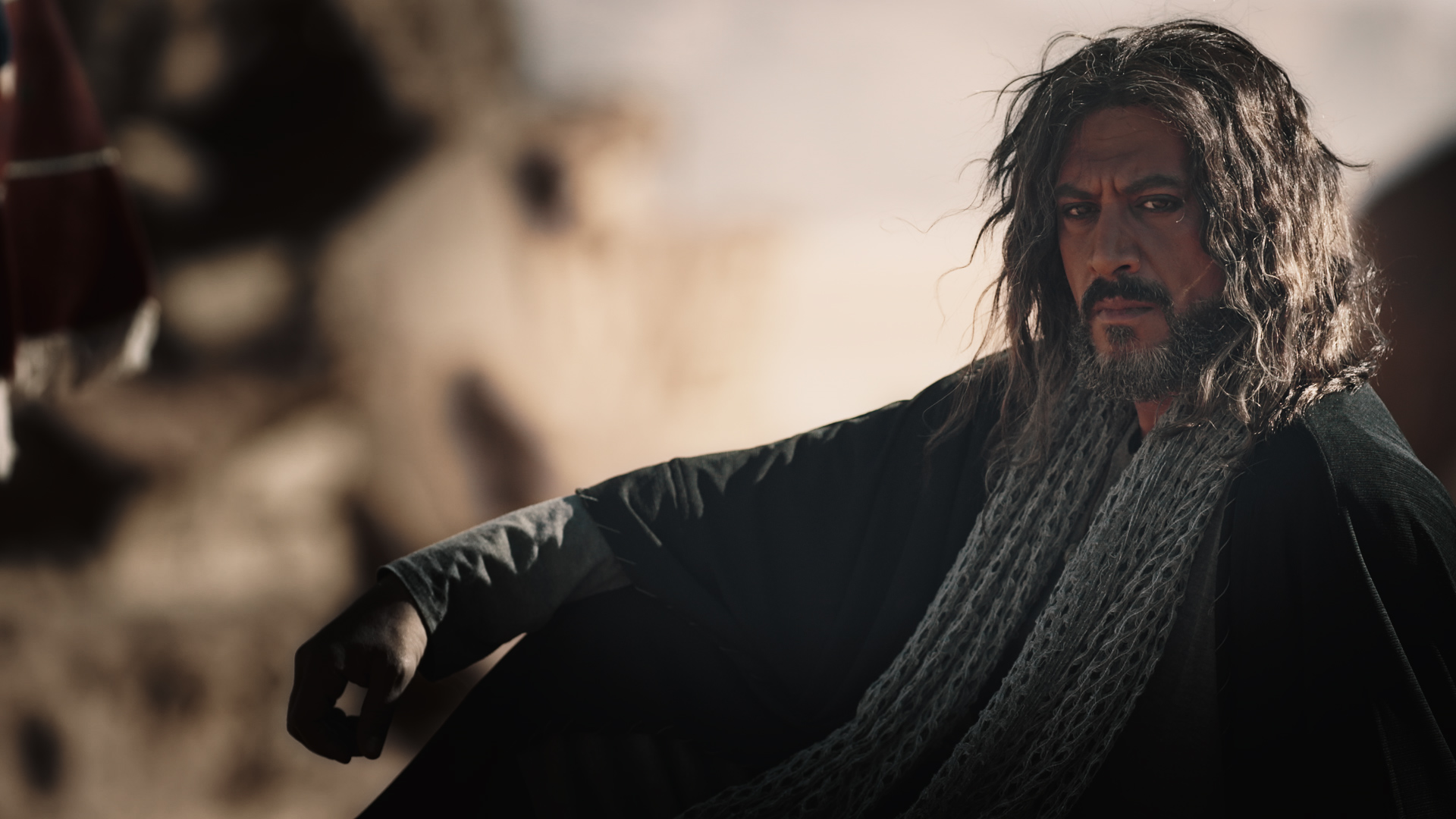
Yasser Al-Masri

Yasser Al-Masri (Arabic: ياسر المصري) (22 November 1970 – 23 August 2018) was a Kuwaiti-born Jordanian-Palestinian actor.

== Biography ==
Yasser Al-Masri was born in Kuwait City to a family of seven brothers and sisters. He graduated from Al-Rumaithiya Secondary School. He held a BA in Music Science from the Jordan Academy of Music, majoring in the clarinet and piano. In 2000, he married a journalist in the Jordanian newspaper Al Ra'i, Nisreen al-Kurd, with whom he had three children.

== Career ==
Yasser Al-Masri had been involved in the art movement since the early 1990s through the "Theater Theater" group founded by Khaled Al-Tarifi in 1994.

He began as an actor in the film Ya Ya Sama'in, and his talent burst in 2007 with his performance of the role of Nimr bin Adwan, a poet in the series Nimr bin Adwan. He participated in many Jordanian and Arab historical dramas. He participated in many local and Arab festivals through a series of theater performances. He served as a coach for the National Division of the Ministry of Culture, representing Jordan in most Arab and international festivals. In August 2016 he was chosen by the Higher Organizing Committee of the Jordan Media Festival for his third session to present the opening ceremony, with the participation of his colleague Ola Al-Fares.

Some of his series include Dawa'er Hob (Circles of Love), the second season of Al-Gama'a, Underground (Taht El-Ard), and Abu Jafar Al-Mansur. In 2010 he established a production company in Jordan called Al Rai.

== Death ==
He died on 23 August 2018 at the age of 47 after a traffic crash in Zarqa in Jordan when he was visiting his brother's house on the Eid al-Adha feast. He wanted to help his neighbor to run a bus that did not work by quickly descending a slope. His nephew, who led the bus on its way down, lost control of it, causing it to collide with a parked car and a wall. He died instantly and his funeral was held in Al Falah Mosque in that city.
