= Yara (singer) =

Lebanese pop singer

Yara يارا
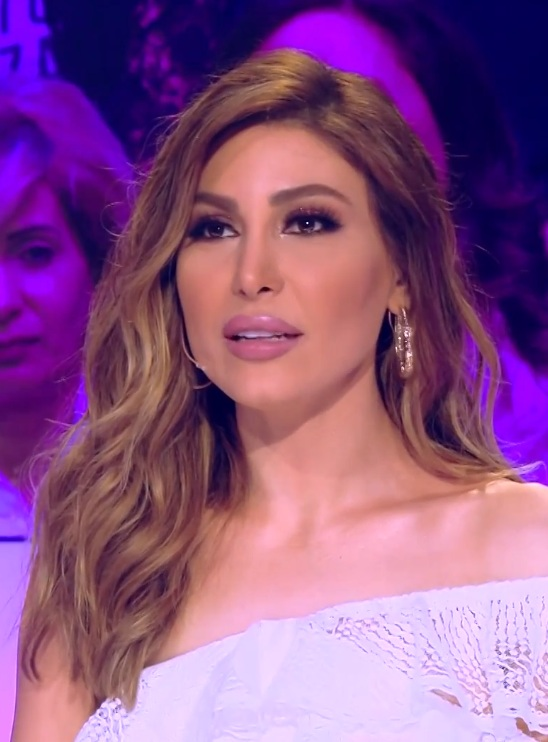
- Yara in 2018

Background information
- Genres: Lebanese music
- Occupation: Singer
- Years active: 2004–present
- Label: T-Music

Yara (Arabic: يارا), is a Lebanese pop singer. She won the music competition broadcast on LBC "Kass el-Nojoum" in 1998 for which she had made a name by singing "Awedak". She was discovered by Lebanese composer Tarek Abou Jaoudeh. Tarek became her producer, and also chose her stage name, "Yara". Being his protegee, he composed most of her first singles, including "Hob Kbir". Her first album, " Twassa Feyi " released in 2005. The singer also works as an ambassador for the Lebanese Red Cross.

== Personal life ==
Yara is a Christian.

== Discography ==
Albums:

- Twassa Feyi (2005)
- Enta Menni (2008)
- La'ale' Khalijiya (2009)
- Ya 3ayesh Bi 3youni (2014)
- Mou Mehtajkom (2016)
- M3azzabni Al Hawa (2017)
- Gheir El Nas (2021)
- Mallayt (2021)
- Taghyeer El Fousoul (2025)

Singles:

- Bala'ab Ala Al Makshouf (2021)

=== Remixes ===
- Yara x Douzi x Dj Youcef - Mallet (Harout Zadikian Remix) (2020)
