= Naya (singer) =

Lebanese singer

Naya نايا
- Also known as: Nibal
- Born: April 11, 1992 (age 32)
- Origin: Lebanon
- Genres: World, Arabic
- Occupation: Singer
- Years active: 2007–present
- Labels: Arabica Music

Naya (Arabic: نايا; born 11 April 1992, in Lebanon) is a Lebanese singer. She was born to the Daw (Daou) family in El Qrayeh, Lebanon. In 2009, Eli Dib introduced her to the Arabic music scene.

== Recording career ==
=== 2008–2009: Melody record and Batmana ===
In 2008 Naya signed a recording contract with Melody Music. Her first single, "Batmanna" was released alongside a music video, directed by Fadi Haddad. Soon after her initial success, Naya and her manager, Yasser Zayed, faced legal issues. These legal issues caused her to postpone working, causing her to gradually disappear from the Arabic music scene.

=== 2010–2011: Elie Dib Management and Arabica Music ===
In November 2010, following a court decision, Naya broke her contract with Zayed. In March 2011, Naya released a new Khaliji song titled "Ghira." The music video was directed by Bassam Turk. Naya was invited to perform "Ghira" on the TV series "Hek Mnghanne" on MTV. In June 2011, following her performance on "Hek Menghanne" and the positive feedback of the song "Mama Ya Mama" Elie Dib and Naya decided to release the song. They obtained the rights and "Mama Ya Mama" was released in all Arab countries.

In October 2011 Naya cancelled her contract with Melody Music and signed to Arabica Music. She next released a Lebanese song named "Tezkar" Written by Mounir Abou Assaf and composed By Hisham Boulos. On 5 November the video clip of "Tezkar", directed by Mamdouh Bayan, was released on Arabica TV.

=== 2012–present: Mandam ===
June 2012 Naya released her first album Mandam with nine Egyptian, Khaliji and Lebanese Arabic songs. Naya worked with Tamer Hosny on one song called "Bel Zouq"

During summer 2013 she released her 4th video, of "Mn Eidy". The video was different, adding many dance steps.

For the motion picture soundtrack of the Bollywood film "Dhoom-3" starring Aamir Khan, Abhishek Bachchan, Katrina Kaif and others, Naya has been roped in to sing the Arabic version of the hugely popular "Dhoom Machale" in sharp resemblance to once extremely popular Asian pop star Tata Young.

In October 2015, a video clip showed her drawing a sign similar to a cross sign in a provocative way which media and authorities in the church described it as disrespectful.

== Television ==
Naya was in Dancing with the Stars: Raqs el Noujoum Season 1, paired with Abdo Dalloul. The judges described her as the energy of the show. On 24 February 2013, on the final show of the first series of DWTSME, she was announced as the winner.

== Discography ==
=== Albums ===
- Mandam (2012)

=== Singles ===
1. "Batmana"
2. "Ghira"
3. "Tezkar"
4. "Mn Eidi"
5. "Wakhedni Hawak"
6. "Mandam"
7. "Mama Ya Mama"
8. "Leh Bahebak"
9. "Bel Zok"
10. "Dhoom Machale Dhoom (Arabic Version)" (Dhoom 3)

== Videography ==
Year	Title	Album	Director
2009	Batmana	Mandam	Bahaa Khaddaj
2011	Ghira	Mandam	Bassem Turk
2011	Tezkar	Mandam	Mamdouh Bayan
2013	Mn Eidy	Mandam	Bahaa Khaddaj
2015	Omi	Single	Bassam Turk
2015	Mandam	Mandam	
