= Celebrity Duets =

- Genre: Reality television
- Directed by: Bruce Gowers
- Presented by: Wayne Brady
- Starring: David Foster; Little Richard; Marie Osmond
- Announcer: Mark Thompson
- Music by: JAGSTER
- Country of origin: United States
- Original language: English
- No. of seasons: 1
- No. of episodes: 9

Production
- Executive producers: Simon Cowell; Michael Levitt; Arthur Smith
- Producers: Oscar Beltran; Angela Heller; Rickey Minor; Russ Ward; Brad Wollack
- Editors: Miguel Camargo; Oren Castro; Cliff Dorsey; Shawn Gutierrez; Marc Markley
- Production companies: Syco TV; Michael Levitt Productions; A. Smith & Co. Productions; Fox Television Studios

Original release
- Network: Fox
- Release: August 29 – September 29, 2006

Celebrity Duets is an American reality television show, of the progressive game-show type, which combined celebrities of different backgrounds with professional singers in a weekly elimination competition.

== History ==
The show was a take-off of the Australian series program It Takes Two and its predecessor, the BBC's Just the Two of Us; however, unlike the British and Australian shows, the celebrities sang with different partners each week. Indeed, Celebrity Duets was meant to be transmitted in the UK first, under the title Star Duets. But the BBC bought the format before Simon Cowell got to produce it on ITV. There was even court action, which the BBC won. Thus, Star Duets never came into production.

== Transmissions ==
The show debuted on Fox, with a 2-hour premiere installment on August 29, 2006. It then moved to its normal Thursday timeslot the following week, and stayed there until its season finale on September 29, 2006.

== Associated personnel ==
Simon Cowell of American Idol and The X Factor fame created the program, and Wayne Brady of Whose Line Is It Anyway? fame, himself a singer and the former host of a variety show on ABC, hosted the show. The judges were renowned composer and producer David Foster, rock and roll pioneer Little Richard, and singer Marie Osmond.

== Contestants ==
Celebrity	Notability (known for)	Placing
Alfonso Ribeiro	The Fresh Prince of Bel-Air actor	Winner (Friday, Sept. 29, 2006)
Lucy Lawless	Xena: Warrior Princess actress	Runner-up (Friday, Sept. 29, 2006)
Hal Sparks	Former Talk Soup host	3rd (Friday, Sept. 29, 2006)
Jai Rodriguez	Emmy Award-winning television host	5th Eliminated (Friday, Sept. 22, 2006)
Cheech Marin	Stand-up comedian & actor	4th Eliminated (Friday, Sept. 22, 2006)
Carly Patterson	Former Olympic artistic gymnast	3rd Eliminated (Friday, Sept. 15, 2006)
Lea Thompson	Film & television actress	2nd Eliminated (Friday, Sept. 8, 2006)
Chris Jericho	WWE wrestler	1st Eliminated (Tuesday, Aug. 29, 2006)

=== Results summary ===
Celebrity	1	2	3	4	Final
Alfonso Ribeiro	Safe	Safe	Safe	Safe	Winner
Lucy Lawless	Safe	Safe	Safe	Safe	Runner-up
Hal Sparks	Safe	Safe	Bottom three	Safe	3rd place
Jai Rodriguez	Safe	Safe	Safe	Eliminated	
Cheech Marin	Safe	Bottom three	Bottom three	Eliminated	
Carly Patterson	Safe	Bottom three	Eliminated		
Lea Thompson	Safe	Eliminated			
Chris Jericho	Eliminated				

== Duet partners ==
- Michael Bolton
- Boyz II Men
- Chaka Khan
- Jesse McCartney
- Clint Black
- Smokey Robinson
- Dionne Warwick
- Gladys Knight
- Brian McKnight
- Patti LaBelle
- Kenny Loggins
- Richard Marx
- Randy Travis
- Belinda Carlisle
- Peter Frampton
- Taylor Dayne
- Aaron Neville
- Lee Ann Womack
- James Ingram
- Wynonna Judd
- Michelle Williams
- Jeffrey Osborne
- Anita Pointer
- Toby Keith
- Dennis DeYoung, formerly of Styx
- Deniece Williams
- Dee Snider, of Twisted Sister
- Al Jarreau
- Sebastian Bach, formerly of Skid Row
- Bonnie Tyler

== Duet partners by contestant ==
- Alfonso Ribeiro - Michelle Williams, James Ingram, Jeffrey Osborne, Deniece Williams, Chaka Khan, Jon Secada, Gladys Knight
- Lucy Lawless - Michael Bolton, Smokey Robinson, Kenny Loggins, Dionne Warwick, Richard Marx, Bonnie Tyler
- Hal Sparks - Smokey Robinson, Gladys Knight, Wynonna Judd, Dennis DeYoung, Dee Snider, Sebastian Bach
- Jai Rodriguez - Gladys Knight, Michelle Williams, Brian McKnight, Taylor Dayne, Patti LaBelle
- Cheech Marin - Peter Frampton, Randy Travis, Clint Black, Aaron Neville, Al Jarreau
- Carly Patterson - James Ingram, Lee Ann Womack, Anita Pointer, Jesse McCartney
- Lea Thompson - Randy Travis, Michael Bolton, Belinda Carlisle
- Chris Jericho - Lee Ann Womack, Peter Frampton

== Judges ==
- David Foster
- Little Richard
- Marie Osmond

== Host ==
- Wayne Brady

== Ratings ==
For the season, the series averaged 3.8 million viewers, making it the lowest-rated Fox series of the entire season, and indeed one of the lowest-rated programs on any network for the season that year. This ratings failure precluded any production of a second season.

== International versions ==
Currently airing franchise
Franchise no longer in production

Country	Name	Host(s)	Network	Date premiered	Judges	Winner(s)
(Arab League) Arab world	ديو المشاهير; Duo El Mashahir	Dina Azar (1-2); Hilda Khalife (3); Annabella Hilal (4)	LBCI (1-3); Murr Television (4)	October 22, 2010	Romeo Lahoud (1-2); Joumana Haddad (1); Marwan Rahbani (1); Abdullah Bakhir (2); Osama Rahbani (2-4); Hassan al-Raddad (3); Mona Abu Hamza (4); Tariq Abu Jouda (4)	Season 1, 2010: Nadine Al Rassi; Season 2, 2011: Maggie Bou Ghosn; Season 3, 2012-2013: Tony Abu Joudeh; Season 4, 2015: Tony Issa
Hungary	A nagy duett	Claudia Liptai (1-4; 6-); Majka (1; 4); Attila Till (2-3; 5; 7-)	TV2 (1; 3-); Super TV2 (2)	April 8, 2011	Tibor Kasza (1-); Zsófi Szabó (7-); Tamás Horváth (7-); András Hajós (7-); Klári Balázs (1-3); Ákos Dobrády (1-3); Andrea Szulák (4-5); Cooky (4-5); Adri Nagy (6); Joci Pápai (6)	Season 1, 2011: Ferenc Molnár & Nóra Trokán; Season 2, 2013: Attila Kökény & Katinka Cseke; Season 3, 2014: Hien & Cooky; Season 4, 2016: Szilvia Péter Szabó & Péter Pachmann; Season 5, 2017: Veca Janicsák & Kornél Simon; Season 6, 2018: Tamás Horváth & Andrea Balázs; Season 7, 2025: Ramóna Lékai-Kiss & Bence Brasch
Jordan	Celebrity Duets Jordan	Mona Al Omari	Channel 1 Jordan	January 7, 2021	Omar Al-Abdallat; Zain Awad; Najem Al-Salman	Season 1, 2021: Rahaf Sawalha
Lithuania	Žvaigždžių duetai	Vytautas Kernagis; Algis Ramanauskas and Inga Jankauskaitė; Rolandas Vilkončius	LNK	June 2, 2007	?	Season 1, 2007: Renata Ražanauskienė & Deiviu; Season 2, 2008: Romas Bubnelis & Aiste Pilvelyte; Season 3, 2009: Giedrius Leškevičius & Mia; Season 4, 2010: Marius Jampolskis & Iruna Puzaraitė; Season 5, 2011: Rūta Pentiokinaitė & Merūnas Vitulskis; Season 6, 2012: ? Season 7, 2013: ? Season 8, 2014: Donata Gutauskienė-Laisva & Radzi; Season 9, 2015: Simonas Storpirštis & Liepa Mondeikaitė
Lithuania	Žvaigždžių duetai nauja era		LNK			upcoming
Philippines	Celebrity Duets: Philippine Edition	Ogie Alcasid and Regine Velasquez	GMA Network	August 11, 2007	Mitch Valdez (1); Mitch Valdez (1); Louie Ocampo (1); Buboy Garovillo (1); Freddy Santos (2-3); Danny Tan (2-3); Tessa Prieto-Valdez (2-3)	Season 1, 2007: Tessa Prieto-Valdez; Season 2, 2008: Bayani Fernando; Season 3, 2009: Joel Cruz
