= Nadine Al Rassi =

Lebanese actress (born 1979)

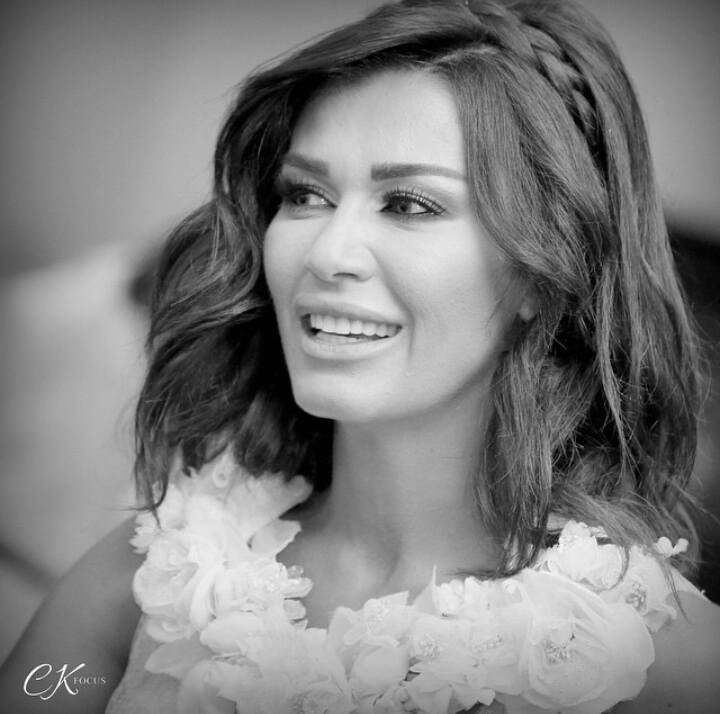
- Nadine Al Rassi in 2015
- Born: Nadine Khalil Al Rassi; 4 September 1979 (age 47); Rahbeh, Lebanon
- Occupation: Actress • model
- Years active: 1999–present
- Spouses: Hatem Hadshiti (m. 1996; div. 1998) Gescard Abi Nader (m. 2001; div. 2016) Raja Nasser El-Deen (m. 2017; div. 2018)
- Children: 3
- Relatives: Georges Al Rassi (brother)

Nadine Al Rassi (Arabic: نادين الراسي; born 4 September 1979) is a Lebanese actress. She began her career in 1999. She has won the Murex d'Or three times; her most famous wins were for Ghanouja bea in 2006, and Passion crime in 2016.

== Early life and career ==
Al Rassi was born in Rahbeh village in North Governorate to artistic family. Her father, Khalil Al Rassi, is a Lebanese oud player from the village of Cheikh Taba in Akkar, Lebanon. Her mother is Aramean from Marmarita. Her younger brother Georges Al Rassi was a singer.

She began her career as a model, and appeared in music videos for Fadl Shaker and Wael Jassar. Her first acting role was in the Al bashwat TV series in 1999. In 2007, she won the Murex d'Or award for best supporting actress in Ghanouja bea (Dad's Girl). A year later, she won the award for best main role actress for her role in the TV series My son. In 2010, she won the same award for the third time for best actress as a life achievement. She also won the Oscar stars award in 2015 as best actress for her role in the Love story TV series. She also competed in the TV reality show Celebrity Duets Arab World, in which she won the first place 2006 after competing against Ameer Karara. She also won the TV game show Celebrity Splash! in 2013, and donated her award to the Lebanese Red Cross.

== Personal life ==
Al Rassi has been married and divorced three times. Her first marriage was in 1996, when she was only seventeen years old, to Hatem Hadshiti. They divorced after a couple of years, after she gave birth to her first son, Mark. Her second marriage was to Lebanese businessman and actor Gescard Abi Nader in 2001. She gave birth to two sons from him, Marcel and Karl, but they divorced in 2016. Her third marriage was to a TV presenter, Raja Nasser El Deen, in 2017, but they divorced after one year.

After her divorce from Gescard Abi Nader, she entered a legal battle for the custody of her two sons from him. Shortly after her divorce, there were allegations that she had had an affair with a married man. The footage leaks show many intimate pictures with a dentist, Raed Lattouf; the two accused each other of publishing these pictures.

Al Rassi also suffered a great deal from depression, and admitted to attempting to commit suicide by throwing herself from a car, but was saved by her son Mark.

She was in a controversy, after she stated that she is Muslahiya and believes in both Christianity and Islam. She was also criticized for her comments against Syrian refugees in Lebanon, but she later apologized for these comments.

In late 2018, she blamed her family for disowning her when she needed help. However, during the 2019–20 Lebanese protests, Al Rassi accused the Banque du Liban of taking her house, and her inability of renting anymore.

== Works ==
=== Movies ===
Year	English name	Arabic name	Role
2006	Ghannoujit Baya	غنوجة بيا	Nadine
2008	Stay with me	Khaelik maei (خليك معي)	Sahar
2011	Fault of my life	Ghalttet Omri (غلطة عمري)	

=== Series ===
Year	English name	Arabic name	Role
1999	The Pashas	Al Bashwat (الباشوات)	
2000	The wolves night	Lail Altheab (ليل الذئاب)	
2000	Duwaik	Duwaik	
2000	Bearish ball	Kert Elsebha	
2000	Ask anything	Es al shi	
2003	Familia	Familia	
2003	Time of Scoundrels	Zaman Al awghad	
2005	The Solutuion in your hand	Alhal bedak	
2006	Ghannoujit Baya	Ghannoujit Baya	Nadine
2007	Mesh Zapta	Mesh Zapta	Lola
2007	Eve in history	Hawa fi altarekh	Nefertiti
2008	Women era	عصر الحريم	Layla
2008	The last night	Al layla Al akhera	Laura
2008	My son	Ebni (إبني)	
2009	Women talk	Kalam neswan	
2010	If electricity don't cut	Law Alkahraba man inaataet	
2010	Loona	Loona	Loona
2010	Mtr Nada	Mtr Nadad	Nada Al Zayat
2012	Needle hole	Khermet Ebra	
2012	If without love	Lawla Alhob	Masa
2013	The birth from waist	Alwelada men Alkhasera	Susan
2013	Chance	Forsa	
2013	We will back soon	Sanaoud Baad Kalil	Dina
2013	Amelia	Amelia	Amelia
2014	Country boys	Welad albalad	
2014–2015	The brothers	Alekhwa	Maria
2015	Feast chance	Forsat eid	
2015	Love story	Qesat hub	Lynne
2016	Passion crime	Jareema shaghaf	Jumana
2017	The two sisters	Alshakekatan	Thoraya
2017	Damask rose	War jori	Jori
2018	Love story	Hadota hob	Aseel

=== Stage ===
Year	English name	Arabic name
2007	Zenobia	Zenobia
2013	Sun and moon	Shams wa qamar
