= Michael Levitt (producer) =

American television producer (born 1968)

- Born: Michael E. Levitt; March 13, 1968 (age 58); Roswell, New Mexico, U.S.
- Occupation: Television producer

Michael Levitt (born March 13, 1968) is an American television producer of award shows, reality shows, game shows and specials. He has produced programs such as Kathy Griffin: My Life on the D-List, The TV Land Awards, The Scream Awards, Live From the Red Carpet, The Billboard Music Awards, Hollywood Squares, The Teen Choice Awards and Celebrity Duets.

Levitt produced one of the most-watched television events in history, the 2009 Michael Jackson memorial service.

== Early career ==
Through the 1990s Levitt helped produce a variety of network and cable television award shows and specials including President Bill Clinton's 50th Birthday Special, the VH1 Vogue Fashion Awards, and the Blockbuster Entertainment Awards.

Under Levitt's leadership, the Billboard Music Awards featured live performances by Aerosmith, Mariah Carey, Metallica, Sting, Celine Dion, Garth Brooks, and Gwen Stefani. Levitt also produced the popular Teen Choice Awards for nearly a decade.

== Formation of Michael Levitt Productions ==
In 2000, Michael Levitt founded his own Hollywood, California-based production company, Michael Levitt Productions.

His first shows under his personal banner were two major network television music specials. Having served as co-producer for the 1993–94 season of The Mickey Mouse Club, Levitt re-teamed with former mouseketeer Britney Spears in April 2000, producing her Fox television special, Britney in Hawaii, which scored a ratings coup for the network. Later that same year, Levitt produced two more specials for Fox: Britney Spears: There's No Place Like Home and The N'Sync N'timate Holiday Special with popular boy band N'Sync.

=== TV Land Awards ===
In 2003, Levitt created the annual TV Land Awards for the TV Land network. The program celebrates classic television, movies, music and pop culture. Honorees have included a who's who of original cast and producers of shows such as M*A*S*H, The Mary Tyler Moore Show, The Brady Bunch, Good Times, E.R., Desperate Housewives, Grey's Anatomy and countless others.

=== Scream Awards ===
Co-created and executive produced by Michael Levitt in 2006, Scream honors the genres of horror, science fiction, and fantasy in film, television, music, and comic books. Recent Scream honorees have included George Lucas, Tim Burton, Anthony Hopkins, Quentin Tarantino, The Dark Knight, and Star Trek.

=== Kathy Griffin: My Life on the D-List ===
In 2009, Levitt took over the role as executive producer of Kathy Griffin: My Life On The D-List. Season Five of the Bravo series included appearances by Bette Midler, Paris Hilton, Paula Deen, Reverend Al Sharpton, and Suzanne Somers and was a ratings high for the network.

=== Ask Oprah's All Stars ===
In late 2010 Levitt partnered with producer Mark Burnett to executive produce Ask Oprah's All Stars, a primetime talk show format uniting Dr. Oz, Dr. Phil, and Suze Orman. The four two-hour specials initially ran the first four Sunday nights of 2011, and were the highest rated on Oprah Winfrey's fledgling OWN network. Two of the specials were moderated by Gayle King, and the other two by Robin Meade. Celebrity appearances included Stevie Wonder, Mario Lopez, Vanessa Williams, Nancy O'Dell, and Winfrey herself.

=== E! Live From The Red Carpet ===
In 2011 Levitt executive produced the E! Live From the Red Carpet shows for The Golden Globe Awards, The Grammy Awards, and The Academy Awards. These specials, hosted by Ryan Seacrest and Giuliana Rancic, garnered E! their highest ratings with 1.6 million viewers tuning into the cable network's Golden Globes red carpet coverage.

=== Celebrity Duets ===
Partnering with Simon Cowell in 2006, Levitt entered the world of reality competition programming by serving as executive producer of the FOX series Celebrity Duets. Using the American Idol model, Celebrity Duets featured eight stars (among them, Lucy Lawless and Alfonso Ribeiro) singing live with legendary recording artists (including Gladys Knight, Randy Travis, Patti LaBelle, etc.) competing for a charity grand prize. Little Richard, David Foster, and Marie Osmond served as celebrity judges. Wayne Brady hosted.

=== Other credits ===
In 2003 Levitt created and produced Nick at Nite Holiday Special, a throwback to the classic Christmas specials of the 1960s and 1970s. His debut into the world of holiday shows featured a wide array of performers including Natalie Cole, Amy Grant, Vince Gill, Sarah McLachlan and Chaka Khan. The show featured a duet of Peace on Earth/Little Drummer Boy by Clay Aiken and Bing Crosby using rotoscoped footage of Crosby taken from one of his 1960s Christmas shows.

In 2007, Levitt developed and produced Back To The Grind for TV Land, a reality series in which television stars performed the actual job for which their TV characters were known. He was also enlisted to produce the finale of mother/daughter beauty pageant series, Crowned: The Mother of All Pageants, which aired as part of The CW's fall 2007 lineup.

In 2007 and 2008, Levitt served as executive producer of The Producers Guild of America Awards. These two years proved to be the most well-received and music-packed celebrations in the Guild's history with musical performances by Paul Simon, Stevie Wonder, Bonnie Raitt, Natalie Cole, Jordin Sparks, Keb Mo and Chris Daughtry.

In 2008, Levitt produced The World Music Awards and The ALMA Awards (both for ABC) and the first annual Spanish-language sports awards show Tecate Premios Deportes for Univision.

In 2009, Levitt was the executive producer of five award shows, including Bravo's pop culture celebration The A-List Awards, the 2009 Game Show Awards for GSN, the second annual Tecate Premios Deportes, The 7th Annual TV Land Awards and Spike TV's annual Scream Awards.

In 2013, he was named executive producer of the 2013 Young Hollywood Awards, which was broadcast for the first time on The CW Network.

In 2014, Levitt produced Cause For Paws: An All Star Dog Spectacular, a prime-time event for the FOX Network, to promote awareness for dog-related issues and shelter rescue. The first of its kind, the program was co-hosted by Jane Lynch and Hilary Swank, and featured celebrities including Miranda Lambert, P!nk, Sharon Osbourne, Paula Abdul, and Betty White, who introduced adoptable dogs to viewers.

== Partnership with Henry Winkler ==
=== Hollywood Squares ===
In 2002, Levitt partnered with veteran actor/producer Henry Winkler when the pair were approached by King World Productions to revamp and update Hollywood Squares, the company's classic game show.

=== Reunion specials ===
Levitt continued working with Winkler throughout the 2000s as they reunited the casts of four long-running classic television series for network TV specials.

Winkler, Ron Howard, Garry Marshall and the whole Happy Days gang returned to Arnold's Diner to reflect back on 11 successful seasons for ABC's Happy Days' Thirtieth Anniversary Reunion, the third highest rated television special of 2005.

A trio of CBS tributes to 1980s soaps began with 2004's Dallas Reunion: The Return to Southfork, which was filmed on location at Southfork Ranch in Dallas, where J.R. Ewing and company took up residence for 13 seasons.

In 2005, the cast of the long-running series Knots Landing reunited for the two-hour special Knots Landing Reunion: Together Again.

The following year Joan Collins, Linda Evans, John Forsythe and the rest of the Dynasty cast reunited for Dynasty Reunion: Catfights & Caviar. Shot at Filoli, the manor estate which served as the setting for the series, the program was an examination of the series which represented the excess of the 1980s.

== The Michael Jackson Memorial Service ==
In July 2009, Levitt co-produced the Michael Jackson memorial service live from Los Angeles' Staples Center. With more than one billion viewers worldwide, the event also was one of the most watched broadcasts in online streaming history.

== Awards ==
- Nominated 2003: Daytime Emmy Nomination for Outstanding Game Show Hollywood Squares
- Won 2010: NAACP Image Award for Outstanding Variety Special "Michael Jackson Memorial"
- Nominated 2010: Primetime Emmy Nomination for Outstanding Reality Series Kathy Griffin: My Life On The D List
- Nominated 2010: GLAAD Award Nomination for Best Reality Series Kathy Griffin: My Life On The D List
- Nominated 2011: Producers Guild of America Award for Best Reality Series Kathy Griffin: My Life On The D List
- Won 2015: Genesis Award for Best Television Special "Cause For Paws: An All-Star Dog Spectacular"
- Won 2016: Genesis Award for Best Television Special "The All-Star Dog Rescue Celebration"
- Nominated 2015: Realscreen Award for Best Reality Series Skin Wars

== Personal life ==
Levitt was born in Roswell, New Mexico, and raised in Orange County, California. He resides in Los Angeles, California.
