= TV Land Award =

Former television awards ceremony

TV Land Awards' logo with the network's previous logo

The TV Land Awards was an American television awards ceremony that generally commemorated shows now off the air, rather than in current production as with the Emmys. Created by Executive Producer Michael Levitt, the ceremony was hosted and broadcast by the TV Land network from 2003–2012 and in 2015 and 2016.

Awards are given in various categories (which change slightly from year to year) and originally included awards voted on by visitors to TV Land's website; they are given to both individual actors/actresses and to entire television series. The Award statuettes are made by New York firm, Society Awards.

In March 2013, TV Land announced that the TV Land Awards were on hiatus. A network spokesman said, "We love the TV Land Awards and think there is great value in the franchise, but we will not be producing the show this spring.” After also skipping 2014, the Awards returned on April 18, 2015. For the 2016 ceremony, it was rebranded as the "TV Land Icon Awards". The ceremony has not been staged since that year.

== Dates, Hosts and Venues ==
Ceremony	Date	Host	Venue
1st Annual TV Land Awards	March 12, 2003	John Ritter	Hollywood Palladium, Hollywood, California
2nd Annual TV Land Awards	March 17, 2004	Brad Garrett	Hollywood Palladium, Hollywood, California
3rd Annual TV Land Awards	March 16, 2005	Cedric the Entertainer	Barker Hangar, Santa Monica Airport, Santa Monica, California
4th Annual TV Land Awards	March 22, 2006	Megan Mullally	Barker Hangar, Santa Monica Airport, Santa Monica, California
5th Annual TV Land Awards	April 22, 2007	Kelly Ripa	Barker Hangar, Santa Monica Airport, Santa Monica, California
6th Annual TV Land Awards	June 15, 2008	Vanessa L. Williams	Barker Hangar, Santa Monica Airport, Santa Monica, California
7th Annual TV Land Awards	April 26, 2009	Neil Patrick Harris	Gibson Amphitheatre, Universal City, California
8th Annual TV Land Awards	April 25, 2010	Tim Allen	Sony Pictures Studios, Culver City, California
9th Annual TV Land Awards	April 17, 2011	Jane Lynch	Javits Center, New York City
10th Annual TV Land Awards	April 29, 2012	Kelly Ripa	Lexington Avenue Armory, New York City
The 2015 TV Land Awards	April 18, 2015	Terry Crews	Saban Theatre, Beverly Hills, California
TV Land Icon Awards 2016	April 17, 2016	George Lopez	Barker Hangar, Santa Monica Airport, Santa Monica, California

== Recipients ==
The following table summarizes the recipients of TV Land's "Discretionary Awards", which do not include any of the awards voted on by viewers (which are generally awarded to actors/actresses or characters).

Year	Host	Award	Recipient	Presented by
2003	John Ritter	Future Classic	American Dreams	Paula Abdul
2003	John Ritter	Groundbreaking Role	Diahann Carroll as Julia	Halle Berry
2003	John Ritter	Innovator	All in the Family	Kathy Bates
2003	John Ritter	Legend	The Dick Van Dyke Show	Matthew Perry and Ted Danson
2003	John Ritter	Pop Culture	Star Trek	Mira Sorvino
2003	John Ritter	Superest Superhero	Lee Majors as The Six Million Dollar Man	Maureen McCormick and Davy Jones
2004	Brad Garrett	Future Classic	Arrested Development	Liza Minnelli
2004	Brad Garrett	Groundbreaking Show	The Mary Tyler Moore Show	Ben Stiller and Eric McCormack
2004	Brad Garrett	Legend	The Andy Griffith Show	Billy Bob Thornton
2004	Brad Garrett	Fan-tastic Phenomenon	Farrah Fawcett	Arsenio Hall and Ed McMahon
2004	Brad Garrett	Pop Culture	Gilligan's Island	Rudy Boesch, Tina Wesson, Jenna Morasca, and Rob Cesternino
2004	Brad Garrett	Visionary	Chico and the Man	George Lopez
2004	Brad Garrett	Superest Superhero	Lynda Carter as Wonder Woman	Chad Everett and Jane Seymour
2004	Brad Garrett	Favorite "Big, Bad Momma"	Vicki Lawrence as Thelma Harper	
2005	Cedric the Entertainer	Future Classic	Desperate Housewives	Teri Hatcher
2005	Cedric the Entertainer	Icon	The Bob Newhart Show	Ray Romano
2005	Cedric the Entertainer	Legend	The Carol Burnett Show	Garry Shandling
2005	Cedric the Entertainer	Little Screen/Big Screen Star	Sally Field	Eva Longoria
2005	Cedric the Entertainer	Pioneer	Aaron Spelling	Peggy Lipton, Michael Cole, Jaclyn Smith, Gavin MacLeod, Bernie Kopell, Joan Collins, Jason Priestley, Luke Perry, Tori Spelling, Jennie Garth, Stephen Collins and Catherine Hicks
2005	Cedric the Entertainer	Pop Culture	Soul Train	Little Richard, Smokey Robinson, Ashanti, Mýa and Stevie Wonder
2005	Cedric the Entertainer	Favorite Airborne Character(s)	Tim Daly, Steven Weber	
2005	Cedric the Entertainer	100th Birthday	Charles Lane	Haley Joel Osment
2006	Megan Mullally	Future Classic	Grey's Anatomy	Jeremy Piven
2006	Megan Mullally	40th Anniversary	Batman	William Shatner
2006	Megan Mullally	Impact	Good Times	Quentin Tarantino
2006	Megan Mullally	Legend	Cheers	Mary Tyler Moore
2006	Megan Mullally	Little Screen/Big Screen Star	Hilary Swank	Robert Downey Jr.
2006	Megan Mullally	Pop Culture	Dallas	John Schneider and Tom Wopat
2006	Megan Mullally	Pioneer	Sid Caesar	Billy Crystal
2006	Megan Mullally	TV's Greatest Music Moment	Diana Ross; Concert in Central Park (1983)	Megan Mullally
2007	Kelly Ripa	The Medallion Award	Taxi	Sharon Stone
2007	Kelly Ripa	The Legacy of Laughter	Lucille Ball	Kirstie Alley and Carol Burnett
2007	Kelly Ripa	The Entertainers	Hee Haw	k.d. lang, The Judds and Willie Nelson
2007	Kelly Ripa	Future Classic	Heroes	Leonard Nimoy and Luke Wilson
2007	Kelly Ripa	30th Anniversary	Roots	Forest Whitaker and Morgan Freeman
2007	Kelly Ripa	Pop Culture	The Brady Bunch	Valerie Bertinelli, Mackenzie Phillips and James Lipton
2007	Kelly Ripa	TV's Greatest Music Moment	Sonny & Cher; Sonny & Cher on Late Night with David Letterman (1987)	n/a
2008	Vanessa L. Williams	Future Classic	The Office	Ed Asner and William Shatner
2008	Vanessa L. Williams	Icon	Lionel Richie	Samuel L. Jackson
2008	Vanessa L. Williams	Innovator	Roseanne	Teri Hatcher
2008	Vanessa L. Williams	Legend	Garry Marshall	Dick Van Dyke, Jack Klugman, Cindy Williams, Penny Marshall and Henry Winkler
2008	Vanessa L. Williams	The Lucille Ball Legacy of Laughter	Mike Myers	Justin Timberlake
2008	Vanessa L. Williams	Pioneer	Jonathan Winters	Robin Williams
2008	Vanessa L. Williams	Pop Culture	The Golden Girls	Steve Carell
2009	Neil Patrick Harris	30th Anniversary	Knots Landing	Reba McEntire
2009	Neil Patrick Harris	Entertainer	Earth, Wind & Fire	Angela Bassett
2009	Neil Patrick Harris	Fan Favorite	Home Improvement	Jamie Lee Curtis
2009	Neil Patrick Harris	Future Classic	Two and a Half Men	Teri Hatcher
2009	Neil Patrick Harris	Hero	Magnum P.I.	Matthew McConaughey
2009	Neil Patrick Harris	Icon	ER	Neil Patrick Harris
2009	Neil Patrick Harris	Impact	M*A*S*H	Martin Sheen
2009	Neil Patrick Harris	Innovator	Married... with Children	Dr. Phil
2009	Neil Patrick Harris	The Lucille Ball Legacy of Laughter	Julia Louis-Dreyfus	Amy Poehler
2009	Neil Patrick Harris	Legend	Don Rickles	Jimmy Kimmel
2009	Neil Patrick Harris	Pop Culture	Sid and Marty Krofft	Will Ferrell
2010	Tim Allen	30th Anniversary	Bosom Buddies	Jay Leno
2010	Tim Allen	Fan Favorite	The Love Boat	Jane Leeves, Wendie Malick and Betty White
2010	Tim Allen	Future Classic	Glee	Paula Abdul
2010	Tim Allen	Icon	Blondie	Jane Lynch
2010	Tim Allen	Impact	Everybody Loves Raymond	Bob Newhart
2010	Tim Allen	Legend	Mel Brooks and Carl Reiner	Billy Crystal
2010	Tim Allen	Pop Culture	Charlie's Angels	Pamela Anderson
2011	Jane Lynch	Fan Favorite	Family Ties	Ben Stiller
2011	Jane Lynch	Icon	Hall & Oates	Paul Reiser
2011	Jane Lynch	Impact	The Cosby Show	Stevie Wonder
2011	Jane Lynch	Legend	Regis Philbin	Barbara Walters
2011	Jane Lynch	Pop Culture	The Facts of Life	Valerie Bertinelli, Jane Leeves and Wendie Malick
2011	Jane Lynch	35th Anniversary	Welcome Back, Kotter	Jane Lynch
2011	Jane Lynch	Tribute to Classic TV Housewives		The Real Housewives of New York City
2012	Kelly Ripa	Fan Favorite	Laverne & Shirley	Katie Couric
2012	Kelly Ripa	Groundbreaking	In Living Color	Whoopi Goldberg
2012	Kelly Ripa	Icon	Aretha Franklin	John Legend
2012	Kelly Ripa	Impact	Murphy Brown	Kelly Ripa
2012	Kelly Ripa	Innovator	One Day at a Time	Fran Drescher
2012	Kelly Ripa	Pop Culture	Pee-wee's Playhouse	Mike Myers
2015	Terry Crews	Fan Favorite	Parenthood	Minka Kelly and Martin Sheen
2015	Terry Crews	Groundbreaking	Ally McBeal	Lauren Graham
2015	Terry Crews	Impact	The Wonder Years	Paula Abdul
2015	Terry Crews	Legend	Betty White	Valerie Bertinelli, Jane Leeves and Wendie Malick
2015	Terry Crews	Pop Culture	Donny Osmond and Marie Osmond	Sutton Foster and Nico Tortorella
2015	Terry Crews	15th Anniversary	Freaks and Geeks	Carl Reiner
