= Dawa'er Hob =

Dawa'er Hob (Arabic: دوائر حب (مسلسل)), (English: Circles of Love) is an Arabic television series produced in 2014.

The series revolves around family relations and social life among a group of characters. Three girls live in Abu-Dhabi and search love in their lives. Each character would have something or more from our surrounding whether at home, work or street, which enables the viewer to find himself in the story's characters of the series.

The series is filmed in Abu-Dhabi, Dubai, Lebanon, Egypt and Switzerland. No. of episodes: 60.

== Cast ==
- Rajaa el Jidawi
- Abdel Rahim Hassan
- Hasnaa Saif el Din
- Dalida Khalil
- Ibrahim el Harby
- Hisham Magdy
- Yaacoub Abdallah
- Shaima Sabet
- Yasser Al-Masri
- Mondher Rayahneh
- Ahmad Jalal Abdel Qawy
- Sumoud el Qandari
- Ingie Al Moqdam
- Rabih Zeitoun
- Shaker Jaber
- Adel Metwalli
- Rania Fahed
- Dunia el Masri
- Huda Al Ghanem
- Mohammed Noor
- Mansour el Ghassani
- Jessy Abdo
- Ousama Assad
- Hassan Hani
- Tara Emad
- Yvonne Maalouf
- Khuloud Issa
- Abdallah al Saif
- Samah Ghandour
- Noha Saleh
- Raja'i Qawas
- Abdel Rahman Malik
- Ola Yassin
- Tha'er Moqbel
- Rawan Mahdawi
- Najwa el Taher
- Martina Roufa'il
- Lina Azar
- Moussa Elias Faze'
- Mohamad Abou Atwan
- Fawzi Al Debbas
- Mohamad Da'is
- Natasha Choufani

== See also ==
- List of Egyptian television series
