= Dad's Girl =

- Directed by: Elie F. Habib
- Written by: Mona Tayeh
- Produced by: Charlie Abi Nader
- Starring: Rita Barsona; Peter Semaan; Nadine Al Rassi; Ghassan Salem
- Distributed by: Rotana Studios
- Release date: 2007
- Running time: 100 minutes
- Country: Lebanon
- Language: Arabic

Dad's Girl (Arabic: غنوجة بيّـا) is a 2007 Lebanese film directed by Elie F. Habib and conceived by Mona Tayeh. It tells the story of a young lady who is spoiled and loved by her father, who insists she marries her previous lover. It rose to prominence in the Middle East and was also rated the funniest comedy movie sequel to ever be released in Lebanon.

== Plot ==
Dad's Girl is a romantic comedy movie that takes place in the south of Lebanon. Rana Barakat (Rita Barsona) is a spoiled adult lady and is dearly loved by her father Farid Barakat (Antoine Balaban) . Rana goes through a lot of obstacles because her father wants her to get married before he dies. Tarek Fayad (Peter Semaan) is the "lover boy" who is in love with Rana Barakat and is trying his very best to get her attention so they can get married because her father trusts him with his life. Then there is, Nadine Kanaan (Nadine Al Rassi) and her husband Chadi Kanaan (Ghassan Salem) who are not getting along because Chadi married her to get the French passport she has, and wants to leave Lebanon but she refuses. Since conflict kept on going between Nadine and Chadi, therefore, Chadi decided to leave and go to Paris, while Nadine stayed and found out that she is pregnant.

Conflicts emerge when one of Tarek's ex-girlfriend Dollie (Rania Issa) has mental issues because she was madly in love with him and he ended up leaving her for Rana. Though, Tarek goes back to Dollie after he finds out that Rana does not want to be with him in the future because she is scared that he might hurt her again.

After a few days Dollie and Rana bump into each other at the hair salon and Dollie shows off her engagement ring to Rana and says that Tarek proposed to her. As well, she tells her the engagement party will be at the Casino she performs at, which makes Rana feel this is revenge and the couple is getting back at her. While at the ceremony, Rana performs and then a few seconds later Dollie goes up on stage and a feud happens between both. Then Rana's maid Sabah (Abeer Aoun) takes scissors and cuts open Dollie's dress, which leaves her embarrassed and she runs off from the ceremony. Then a huge fight occurs between Dollie's family and Rana's security guards, which ends them up at the police station. After waiting a few hours in the police station Tarek paid bail for everyone because it was midnight and no one wanted to sleep in jail that late.

After everyone got out of jail, Tarek told Rana that her actions were not acceptable and that she has to face the consequences alone if Dollie decided to file a lawsuit against her. In addition, he tells Rana to admit that she is jealous but Rana still denies the fact she loves him.

While all this happens, Nadine and Chadi reconnect with each other, which makes Nadine fly off to Paris and Chadi goes back to Lebanon, though, they did not know that they would leave and not find each other. Therefore, they have a small argument over the phone but then express their love together and Chadi waits till Nadine gets back to Lebanon.

Meanwhile, Tarek goes to Dollie's house and Dollie goes insane since she thought Tarek went off and saw Rana after the conflict in the Casino. He denies that fact but this urges Dollie to go insane and decides to kill Rana, because she knows Tarek is lying to her. Tarek realizes that Dollie was not joking and runs off to find Rana, but Dollie found her first and as soon as Tarek arrives Rana's house, Dollie has stabbed Rana and she is rushed to the hospital. On the way to the hospital, Tarek asks Rana on what happened and she confesses that she loves him and she cannot live without him and then she loses consciousness.

The movie ends with Rana in the hospital and is gathered around by family and friends. Then a few weeks later Tarek takes Rana to a private area along the beachside and proposes to her. Rana accepts and they end it with a slow dance.

== Cast ==
- Rita Barsona as Rana Barakat
- Peter Semaan as Tarek Fayad
- Antoine Balban as Farid Barakat
- Nadine Al Rassi as Nadine Kanaan
- Ghassan Salem as Chadi Kanaan
- Rania Issa as Dolly
- Abeer Aoun as Sabah
