= Enta Menni =

Studio album by Yara
- Released: 2008
- Recorded: 2006–2008
- Genre: Pop, Folk
- Label: Melody Music, Rotana

Yara chronology
Twassa Feyi (2005)	Enta Menni (2008)	La'ale' Khalijiya (2009)

Singles from Enta Menni
- 1. "Bahlam bi Einak (2007)"; 2. "Enta Menni (2008)"; 3. "Ma Yhimmak (2008)"; 4. "Hadi Asabak (2008)"; 5. "Hawel Marra (2009)"

Enta menni is Yara's second music disc album and was released in the summer of 2008. It is a Melody Music production. Two years after her breakthrough with her duet "Akhdny maak" with famous singer Fadl Shaker the album proved to be a bigger success than her first album released in 2005 Twassa Feyi isn't much different from her usual; romantic songs that bring the world of imagination and fantasy to the listener, however the album lyrics touches on a more "Artistically Mature" Yara especially since this would be the first album she sings in the Khaliji dialect. The album contains 10 songs in the different Arabic dialects; Egyptian, Lebanese and Khaliji. The title track "Enta Menni" ("You are part of Me") which is an Egyptian song was one of the most successful songs of the year.

The video was shot under the direction of Lebanese music director Leila Kanaan was shot between Tripoli and Jumaizeh in Lebanon.

== Track listing ==
1. "Alli La"
2. "Bahlam Bi Ainayk"
3. "Bi Jimlit Elli Rah"
4. "Enta Menni"
5. "Enta Menni - Remix"
6. "Haddi A3sabak"
7. "Hawil Marra"
8. "Hessak Aynak"
9. "Jayi"
10. "Ma Yhimmak"
