= Natasha Choufani =

Lebanese actress (born 1989)

- نتاشا شوفاني
- Born: 6 August 1989 (age 36); United Arab Emirates
- Website: Official website

Natasha Choufani (Arabic: نتاشا شوفاني) is a Lebanese actress.

== Background ==
A graduate of the Lebanese American University (LAU) with an Honors Bachelor's degree in Communication Arts in 2010, she had been taught by Lebanese theater directors and actors, Lina Abyad and Nagy Souraty. Choufani later went on to develop her skills further in several drama workshops, while working as an extra on sets and taking part in independent short films.

== Career ==
=== Acting ===
After several small speaking roles, she got her break in 2013 she landed a supporting role in the year-long Lebanese hit TV series Khtarab el Hay (Neighborhood Breakdown) as Dolly, a jealous, conceited, misunderstood girl who gets into trouble with the whole neighborhood. The role earned her a Murex D'or nomination as "Best Upcoming Actress" in 2015 and opened doors to playing many other various characters, such as Haneen, a troubled drug-addict who attempts to take her own life when faced with the controversies of her society in the pan-Arab series Dawa'er Hob: Circles of Love, and tormented Carmen in “Abriaa w Laken”, an Arabic adaptation of the Agatha Christie novels, “Ordeal by Innocence” and “Appointment with death”. She then starred on the MTV series Teen Wolf Where she portrayed Michelle Shaheed from Season 3 until later as a recurring role. This was so far her only work on American Television. She took part in several series in Ramadan from then on, working her way into different characters in each project.

In an interview in which she was asked about the Lebanese TV series industry, Choufani stated that though there was a continual development and improvement, but stressed on the importance of returning to the roots of Lebanese culture, literature and history in the local TV story-lines in order to elevate the essence of the locally produced TV series and cinema as viewers have a need to watch content that they could relate to and identify with.

Between 2015 and 2016, at the age of 26, she starred in the leading role alongside Lebanese director and actor Georges Khabbaz in his play "Ma' el Waqt... Yimkin" (With Time... Perhaps), where she performed in Chateau Trianon Theater in Beirut. Approximately 100,000 people attended over the course of six months.

== Activism ==
=== Women Rights ===
==== Mesh Basita / It is not Ok - The Kip Project's Campaign against Sexual Harassment ====
In the summer of 2017, Choufani collaborated with "The Kip Project" and The Lebanese Ministry of Women Affairs in a national campaign called "#Mesh_Basita"(translates to "It's not okay/I am not a fool") against sexual harassment. The campaign received much coverage in the press, after the video ad went viral and provoked strong reactions on social media.

Choufani gave several interviews discussing her involvement in the campaign:

"I joined the campaign because it was important for me to open a debate on something that was usually taboo to discuss. You will not find a girl who hasn’t been exposed to harassment, and whenever we complain about it, we are instantly shut down.

The reactions to the campaign were especially difficult for me, because it showed people’s ignorance on the definition of sexual harassment; that it is not really about attraction, it is about power and control. You see, the harasser on the street knows that the girl will know better than to react. She has been taught to ignore, especially in our society. If she tries to defend herself, they will say that she is too masculine, or she exaggerates, or they will accuse her of having psychological issues because any "normal" girl should be flattered at the attention. She will prefer to ignore and let it pass over so as to not draw attention to herself. He knows that she is in a weaker position than he, so he abuses the situation with pleasure.

After the campaign, many young girls asked me what does harassment mean? I realized that they don’t know what it means at this age, because our parents always say, "don’t go there" and "don’t talk to X or Y". But they don’t explain why, or they don’t explain what may happen. Overprotecting our daughters will not empower them. When they do go out and get harassed, they will feel guilty and ashamed, because they will think it is because of them, and not because the harasser is sick and cowardly.

We need a change of laws, but we also need to raise awareness about it at schools, scouts, summer camps, and give workshops on female empowerment and positive masculinity. Men and women should no longer feel ashamed or scared to speak up."

==== ESCWA ====
On March 5, 2019, Choufani took part of the ESCWA event to celebrate International Women's day as one of the speakers of the ceremony. She performed her poem "When you lose your body", depicting the cycle of violence victims of rape go through as they face society after surviving their own ordeal. The poem took her two years to write as she gathered stories from survivors of sexual assault and found a similar cycle in their experiences.
