= Daniella Rahme =

Lebanese-Australian actress and TV presenter

- دانييلا يوسف رحمة
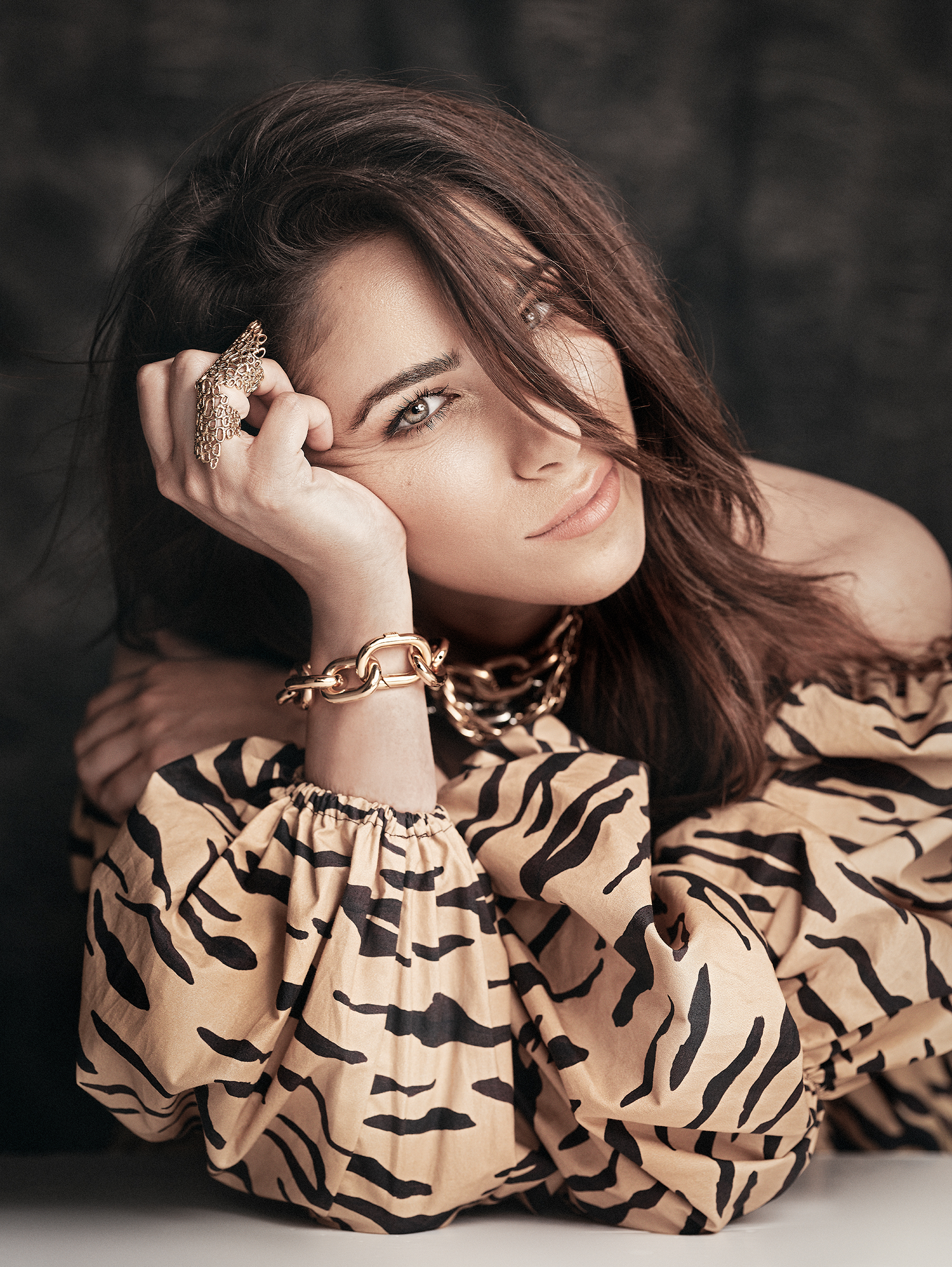
- Born: Daniella Yousef Rahme; 13 October 1990 (age 35); Sydney, Australia
- Education: National Institute of Dramatic Art, Sydney; Macquarie University, Sydney; Notre Dame University–Louaize, Zouk Mosbeh
- Occupations: Actress, TV presenter
- Years active: 2009–present
- Spouse: Nassif Zeytoun (m. 2024)

Daniella Youssef Rahme (Arabic: دانييلا يوسف رحمة; 13 October 1990) is a Lebanese Australian actress, dancer, TV host and beauty pageant titleholder. She is the winner of the second season of Dancing with the Stars: Raqs Al Noujoum.

== Early life ==
Daniella Rahme was born in Sydney to Lebanese parents who immigrated to Australia during the Lebanese Civil War. Her father is the Lebanese singer Youssef Rahme. She attended Rosebank College Five Dock in high school then went on to study at the National Institute of Dramatic Art and Macquarie University in Sydney. She later resumed her studies at Notre Dame University–Louaize, Zouk Mosbeh.

== Career ==
Following her first TV Foot Locker commercial in 2009, Daniella was selected to participate in the second edition of Dancing with the Stars: Raqs el Noujoum in 2014. Her boundless energy, captivating presence, and lauded performances quickly made her a fan favorite, and she was crowned the winner. She then went on to host MBC X Factor, followed by the popular talent show, Arab Casting, on Abu Dhabi TV.

She has always had a passion for acting, fostering it during her school years by participating in theater and drama programs. That dream became a concrete reality in 2018, when she debuted her acting career as Yara in Beirut City, receiving hugely positive reviews from critics and audiences alike. Subsequently, she took on the lead role of Farah in Tango, sharing the screen with Bassel Khayat, Bassem Moughnieh, and Dana Mardini. The series was met with acclaim and high ratings, and Daniella's performance was greatly praised, earning her the Murex d'Or Award for "Phenomenon of the Year” in 2018, and the Al-Anbaa Kuwait Award for "Best Actress”.

Daniella took on her third lead role as Majdouline in The Writer, which was streamed on Netflix worldwide and reached the “trending” status on the platform.

== Criticism ==
Despite Daniella's success, she faced much criticism regarding her Australian accent and its impact on her acting roles.

== Other activities ==
She is the ambassador for L'Oreal Paris and Galaxy Chocolates, as well as the first female Ambassador of Hublot watches in the MENA region. Daniella is involved with a slew of causes and charities both in Lebanon and abroad, in raising funds and awareness for Himaya, the Children’s Cancer Center, Heartbeat, the Hôtel Dieu Hospital in Lebanon, and the Starlight Foundation in Australia. In Namibia, she worked with the "Knowledge Foundation" and wishes to establish her own charitable foundation.

== Personal life ==
Rahme married Syrian singer Nassif Zeytoun on 1 July 2024.

== Awards and Contests ==
- Winner of Miss Lebanon Australia 2009
- Winner of Miss Lebanon Emigrant 2010
- Winner of Dancing with the Stars: Raqs el Noujoum (2014)
- Murex d’Or Award for Phenomenon of the Year (2018)
- Best Actress Award at “Al Anbaa” Kuwait (2014)
- Murex d’Or award for Best Lebanese actress for her role in Awlad Adam (2020)
- DIAFA Award for Best Lebanese actress (2022)

== Filmography ==
Television roles
Year	Title	Role	Notes
2018	Beirut City	Yara	Debut
2018	Tango	Farah	Murex d'Or award for "Phenomenon of the Year"
2019	The Writer	Majdouline	Available on Netflix
2020	Al-Awdah	Nassim Hajjar	Available on Shahid
2020	Children of Adam	Maya	Available on Netflix
2020	DNA	Aya	Shahid Originals
2021–2023	Till Death	Reem/Wejdan	Available on Shahid and Netflix
2025	Nafas	Rouh	Available on Shahid

Awards and achievements
Preceded by Sarah Mansour	Miss Lebanon Emigrant; 2010	Succeeded by Maria Farah
