= Pierre Khadra =

Lebanese dancer, choreographer

- Born: Lebanon
- Occupations: Dancer, choreographer, and director

Pierre Khadra (Arabic: بيار خضرا) is a Lebanese dancer, choreographer, and director.

Khadra is known for his work with Lebanese artists such as Myriam Fares and Dalida Khalil.

== Career ==
Khadra has appeared on the Lebanese TV show So you think you can dance, for which he has won an award. He has also choreographed for various artists and TV shows, such as MTV Lebanon.

He is also a creative director with who has produced various music videos. In 2021, he produced a music video for the song "My Story" by Khalil Abu Obeid. Additionally, he has worked with various singers such as Dalida Khalil.

Additionally, Khadra is a dancer and dance coach, having trained dancers such as Myriam Fares.

=== Music video directing ===
Khadra directed Dalida Khalil's single Chic Awi, which was released on November 16, 2020. The music video reached half a million views within the first week of its release.

He also directed Dalida Khalil's single Moody Aali, which was released on December 2, 2021.
