= Maguy Bou Ghosn =

Lebanese actress (born 1975)

Maguy Bou Ghosn ماغي بو غصن
- Born: 18 September 1975 (age 51); Bsalim, Metn District, Lebanon
- Occupation: Actress
- Years active: 1991–present
- Spouse: Jamal Sannan (m. 2003)
- Children: 2

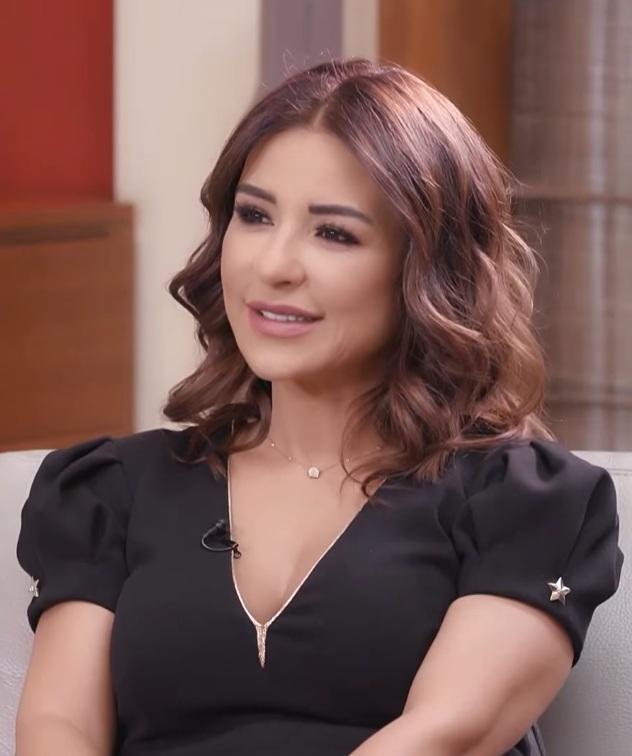
Maguy Bou Ghosn in 2018

Maguy Bou Ghosn (Arabic: ماغي بو غصن, born 18 September 1975) is a Lebanese actress. Bou Ghosn debuted her acting career in various television series in the Arab world. In 2008, she made her breakthrough with the drama TV series "Asr el Hareem" and "Metel El Kezzeb" in 2011, both being aired on LBC. She is a Murex d'Or winner.

== Acting career ==
Bou Ghosn studied acting and directing at the Lebanese University. Her acting career debuted when she started portraying in many successful TV series through the Arab World. In 2008, Bou Ghosn portrayed Amira in "Asr El Harim", Jana in "Maitre Nada", Vera in "Dr. Hala", Jihane in "Metel El Kezzebeh". In 2011, Bou Ghosn made starred in the well-advertised Ramadan comedy TV Series "Akher Khabar" and her fans loved her performance, calling it a very new of kind. Later that year, Bou Ghosn starred in a Comedy-Drama TV series "Auberge", which aired on MTV from 2011 till 2012 and it was such a great success. In Ramadan 2012, Bou Ghosn starred in "Duo Al Gharam" and played the leading role beside Carlos Azar. She then starred in her first movie "BeBe" in 2013, which considered to be the number 1 movie in Lebanon with over 152,000 admission tickets within 14 weeks. That movie was then followed by two successful movies "Vitamin" in 2014 and "Al Sayyida Al Thaniya" in 2015. All three movies were highly advertised and said to have sold a huge number of admission tickets.

Bou Ghosn was the lead actress in a number of Ramadan series. In "24 Qirat" (2015) she shared the leading role with Abed Fahed and Cyrine Abdelnour. In 2016, she shared the leading role of her new Ramadan series "Ya Rayt" with Qays Cheikh Najib and Maxim Khalil. Other works she appeared in include the movie "Welaane" (2016), the series "Caramel" (2017), the movie "Habbet Caramel" (2017) and the series "Julia" in Ramadan 2018.

== Music career ==
Bou Ghosn attending the launching of her charity single "Saken El Sama Byesmaa". Bou Ghosn's childhood dream was always to become a successful singer. In late 2011, Bou Ghosn participated in the second season of Celebrity Duets in which she and Carlos Azar battled in the finale prime for the grand prize. Bou Ghosn won and donated her prize to St. Jude Children Cancer Center. On 15 June 2012, Bou Ghosn premiered her first charity single "Saken El Sama Byesmaa", composed by Oussama Al Rahbani and written by Ghadi Al Rahbani, during the launching of the CD. On June 16, Bou Ghosn released her second single "Ma Ba2a Baddi Hebbak" which has been featured in her 2012 Ramadan TV series "Duo Al Gharam". In December 2013, Bou Ghosn participated in the huge concert One Lebanon by Tania Kassis.

== Songs ==
- "Saken El Sama Byesmaa" (2012)
- "Ma Ba2a Baddi Hebbak" (2012)
- "Ossetna (featuring Carlos Azar)" (2012)
- "Ertahi Ya Hayati (featuring Carlos Azar)" (2012)
- "Kent Bfakker (Vitamin Movie)" (2014)
- "Kouni enti (habbet caramel)" (2017)

== Filmography ==
Television
Year	Show	Role	Notes
2000	Asrar El Madina	Hanadi	
2000	Al Khawali	Nasra	
2001	Wa Yazoul El Khatar		
2001	Action		
2001–2003	Hammam El Kishani	Basma	Season 4-5
2002	Akbiyat Al Mawt		
2002	Holako		
2003	Saret Ma’i		
2003	Kawabis Mountasaf Al Layl		
2008	Dr. Hala	Vera	Supporting role
2008	Asr El Harim	Amira	
2009	Layali	Dima	
2010	Maitre Nada	Jana	Supporting role
2011	Metel El Kezeb	Jihane	Lead role
2011	Akher Khabar	Sawsan	Lead role
2011–2012	Auberge	Hiba	Lead Role
2012	Duo Al Gharam	Dalia	Lead role
2013	BeBe	Badiaa	Lead role
2014	Vitamin	Zmorod	Lead role
2015	24 Kirat	Haya	Lead role
2015	Al Sayida Al Taniya	Dahab/Almaza	Lead role
2016	Ya Rayt	Jana	Lead role
2017	Caramel	Maya	Lead role
2018	Julia	Julia	Lead role
2019	Time Out	Yara	Lead role
2019	Prova	Layal	Lead role
2020	Awlad Adam	Dema	Lead role
2021	Lel Mawt	Sahar	Lead role
2024 2025	Aa Amal Bill Dam	Yasar Ghalia	Lead role

=== Dubbing ===
- Pokémon - minor characters, additional voices (Arabic dubbing)
