= Till Death Do Us Part =

Till Death Do Us Part is a well-known phrase from the marriage liturgy in the Book of Common Prayer.

Till Death Do Us Part, Til Death Do Us Part, or Till Death Us Do Part may also refer to:

== Films ==
- Death Do Us Part, a 2014 Canadian horror film
- 'Til Death Do Us Part (film), a 2017 American psychological thriller film
- Til Death Do Us Part (2023 film), an American film directed by Timothy Woodward Jr.
- Till Death Do Us Part (1959 film), an Australian television play
- Till Death Do Us Part (2024 film), an Indonesian film directed by Upi Avianto
- Till Death Us Do Part (film), a 1969 film based on the BBC television series Till Death Us Do Part
- Til Death Do Us Part, a 2014 television directed film by Farhad Mann.
- Til Death Do Us Part, a 2024 american television film directed by Nick Lyon

== Music ==
=== Albums ===
- Till Death Do Us Part (Cypress Hill album), 2004
- Till Death Do Us Part (Deicide album), 2008
- Till Death Do Us Part (Geto Boys album), 1993

=== Songs ===
- "Until Death Do Us Part" (song), translation by James Campbell of "Je l'aime à mourir" by Francis Cabrel
- "Till Death Do Us Part", a song by Belladonna on the album The Noir Album
- "Til Death Do Us Part," a song by The Kinks from The Great Lost Kinks Album
- "Till Death Do Us Part", a song by Madonna on the album Like a Prayer
- "Till Death Do Us Part", a song by White Lion on the album Mane Attraction
- "Til Death Do Us Part", a song by Mötley Crüe on the album Mötley Crüe
- "Til Death Do Us Part", song by Exodus from the album Pleasures of the Flesh

== Publications ==
- Till Death Do Us Part (Carr novel), by John Dickson Carr, 1944
- Till Death Do Us Part (McDaniel novel), by Lurlene McDaniel, 1997
- Until Death Do Us Part (manga), a 2005 manga series
- Till Death Us Do Part: A True Murder Mystery, a 1978 book by Vincent Bugliosi

== Television ==
=== Series ===
- 'Til Death Do Us Part (American TV series), a Court TV series
- 'Til Death Do Us Part: Carmen and Dave, an MTV series
- Till Death Us Do Part, a UK TV series

=== Episodes ===
- "Till Death Do Us Part", The A-Team, season 1
- "Till Death Do Us Part", an episode of X-Men: The Animated Series
- "Till Death Do Us Part", Diagnosis: Murder, season 6
- "'Til Death Do Us Part" (Star Trek: Deep Space Nine)
- "Till Death Do Us Part", Castle, season 4
- "Till Death Do Us Part" (NCIS)
- "Till Death Do Us Part", NCIS: Los Angeles
- "Till Death Do Us Part" (Pretty Little Liars)
- "Til Death Do Us Part", Thriller
- "Til Death Do Us Part", Harley Quinn
- "Til Death Do Us Part", Siren
- "Til Death Do Us Part", Married at First Sight, season 4
- Til Death Do Us Part (Big Love), an episode of the American TV series Big Love

== See also ==
- Marriage vows
- Til Death (disambiguation)
- Big Brother: 'Til Death Do You Part, season 9 of the American edition of Big Brother
- "Hasta que la muerte nos separe", a film short in the 2014 Argentine anthology Wild Tales
- Till Deaf Do Us Part, an album by Slade
- "Till Death Do Us Apart", a song by Arven on the album Music of Light
- Till Death Do Us Party, an album by Adore Delano
