= Fares Karam =

Lebanese singer (born 1974)

Fares Karam فارس كرم
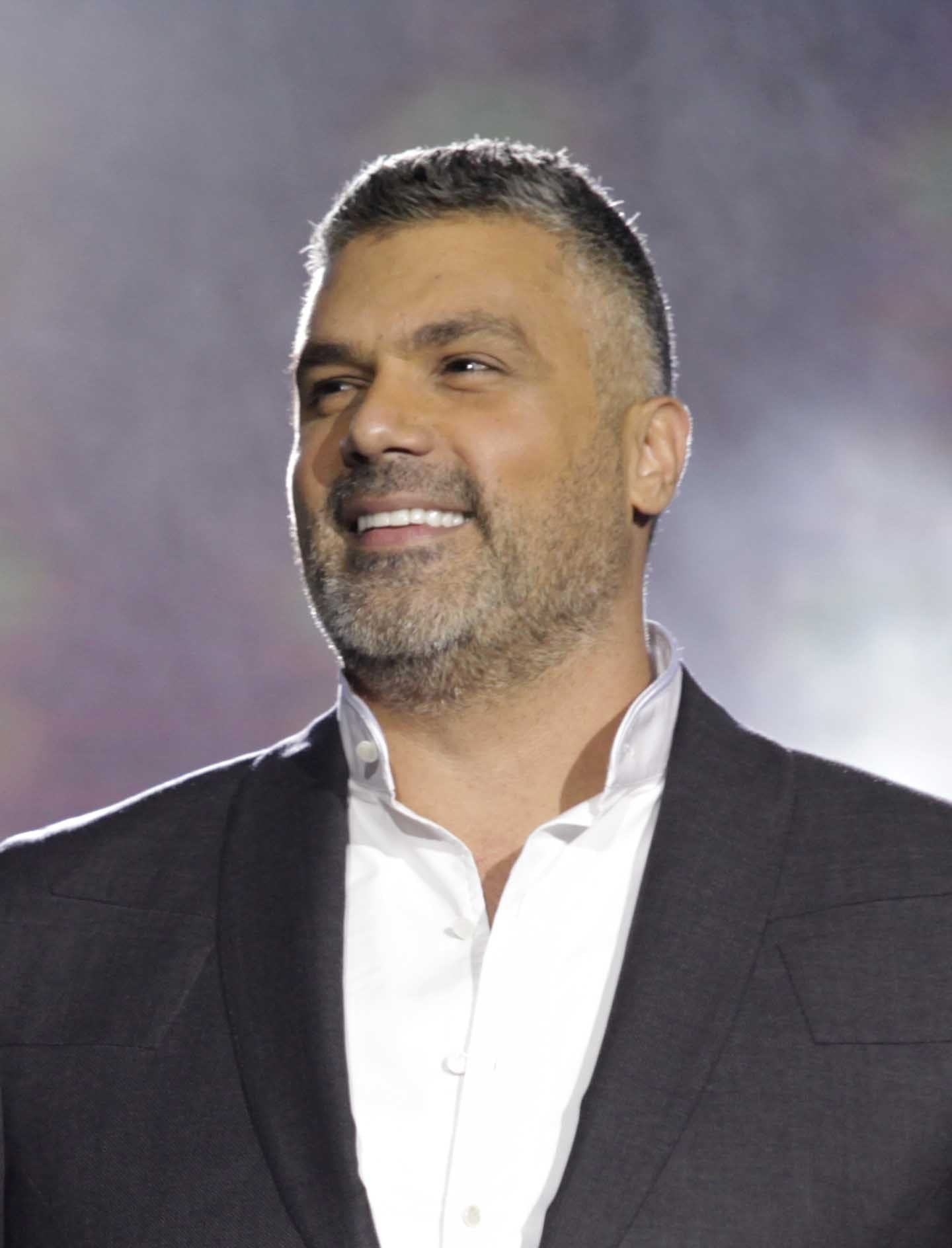
- Karam during a performance at the Karmsaddeh Festival, 2017

Background information
- Born: January 21, 1974 (age 52); Jezzine, Lebanon
- Occupation: Singer
- Years active: 1997–present

Fares Karam (Arabic: فارس كرم; born January 21, 1974) is a Lebanese singer who specializes in the Dabke style and Lebanese music in general. He is known for the songs "Ritanee" (I Wish), "El-Tannoura" (The Skirt), "Shefta" (I Saw Her) and "Neswanji" (Womanizer). Throughout his career, he has participated in a large number of concerts, public celebrations and festivals all over Lebanon. Karam has also toured the Arab World, UK, South America, United States, Europe, Australia and Canada.

== Biography ==
Karam was born in Jezzine, in Southern Lebanon, to a Maronite family. His father was a farmer and his mother worked as a teacher in the local school for their village. He has one sister, Madonna, with whom he maintains a very close relationship. Karam grew up in the mountainous areas of Lebanon, and later attributed his song "Jabali" to this experience.

Fares Karam rose to the limelight in the 1990s when he participated in the 1996 series of the Lebanese talent show Studio El Fan and received the gold medal. He signed with Rotana Records. His musical style is linked more closely to Dabke. His live band plays many of his songs with a large tabl (drum).

== Discography ==
=== Albums ===
- Chlonn (1998)
- Janen (2002)
- Aktar Min Rohi (2003)
- Dakeelo (2004)
- W'edni (2005)
- Yo' Borni (2007)
- El Hamdlilah (2010)
- Fares Karam 2013 (2013)
- 44:36 (2018)

=== Singles ===
- Aal Tayib (2015)
- Bala Hob Bala Bateekh (2016)
- Mnamnam (2016)
- Aa Mawedna Walla Shou (2022)
- Amarjee (2022)
