= Abdullah Rassi =

Lebanese physician and politician (1925–1994)

Member of the Parliament
- In office 1972–1994

Minister of Interior
- In office April 1984 – 1988
- Prime Minister: Rashid Karami; Selim Hoss

Personal details
- Born: 1929
- Died: 1994 (aged 64–65)
- Spouse: Sonia Frangieh
- Children: Karim Rassi
- Occupation: Physician

Abdullah Rassi (1929–1994) was a Lebanese physician and politician. He worked as a physician in Saudi Arabia in the 1960s and following the election of his father-in-law Suleiman Frangieh as the President of Lebanon in 1972 he began to involve in politics. Rassi was a long-term member of the Parliament of Lebanon and served as the minister of interior between 1984 and 1988.

== Biography ==
Rassi was born in 1929 and hailed from a Greek Orthodox family. He worked as a physician in Riyadh, Saudi Arabia, from 1960s to the early 1970s. Upon his return to Lebanon he was elected to the Lebanese Parliament in 1972 and served there until 1994. He was appointed minister of interior to the cabinet led by Prime Minister Rashid Karami on 13 April 1984. Rassi was accompanying Rashid Karami in June 1987 while traveling to Beirut via a military helicopter. Karami was killed while Rassi and others were wounded when the helicopter was exploded by a time bomb.

In 1966 Rassi married Sonia Frangieh, daughter of Suleiman Frangieh. One of their children is Karim Rassi who also served at the Lebanese Parliament. He died in 1994.
