= Dina Hayek =

Lebanese singer (born 1975)

Dina Hayek دينا حايك
- Born: Colette Bou Gergis; June 10, 1982 (age 44)
- Origin: Jounieh, Lebanon
- Genre: Arabic
- Occupation: singer
- Years active: 1999–present

Dina Hayek (Arabic: دينا حايك; born Colette Bou Gergis [كوليت بوجرجس] on July 20, 1975) is a Lebanese actress and singer. She gained popularity by the release of her second album, Katabtillak (2005).

== Career ==
Hayek started her career year 1999 as a solo artist, after being discovered by composer George Mardorzian. Her debut album, Sehir Al Gharam was released in 2003 on the record label Music Master International, and included the single by the same name which was backed by Egyptian music channel Melody TV.

Hayek's commercial breakthrough came when she signed a contract with the Saudi Arabian record label Rotana. Her second album, titled Katabtillak, was released in 2005. It included the singles, "Katabtillak" and "Darb el-Hawa'a". Hayek's third album, Ta'ala Albi, was released in 2006. It included the single by the same name.

Hayek has admitted that some Rotana artists, such as singer Elissa, get more attention from the record company executives than the rest. She was also very disappointed with the promotional efforts made for Ta'ala Albi, and the low sales figures – compared to Katabtillak – in both Egypt and the Persian Gulf region. She also showed very disappointment in Rotana for claiming that they were not able to secure her a performance at the 2007 Hala Febrayer Festival in Kuwait, and later that year she eventually resigned from her contract with Rotana.

== Discography ==
- Sehir Al Gharam (2003)
- Katabtillak (2005)
- Ta'ala Albi (2006)
