= Alaa Zalzali =

Lebanese singer (born 1969)

Alaa Zalzali علاء زلزلي
- Born: Ali Ahmed Zalzali; 18 October 1969 (age 56)
- Origin: Tyre, Lebanon
- Occupation: Singer
- Website: alaazalzali.com myspace.com/zalzali

Alaa Zalzali (Arabic: علاء زلزلي; born Ali Ahmed Zalzali; 18 October 1969) is a Lebanese singer.

== Personal life ==
He is married to Joanne Esmat, a Palestinian–Jordanian businesswoman who serves as the Chairwoman of Osha International Consulting and several other companies. He has four children: three sons — Majd, Thaer, and Liwaa — and one daughter, Meral.

== Life ==
Zalzali's first song "Ahla Oyoun" was released in 1990. On 2007, Alaa announced a new single called "Ya Nasrallah". The lyrics are based on the efforts and courage of the fighters in South Lebanon during the 2006 Summer War between Hezbollah and Israel.

== Discography ==
=== Albums ===
Year	Album	
1990	Tariq el-Qadar	طريق القدر
1991	Ahla Oyoun	احلى عيون
1992	Wahashtini	وحشتيني
1994	Hobbi Wi-jnouni	حبي وجنوني
1995	Law Baddek Ghayri	لو بدك غيري
1995	Iddallali	اتدللي
1995	Raheeb	رهيب
1995	At-haddani	اتحداني
1996	El-Leil al-Maftouh	الليل المفتوح
1997	Hayati Moghamra	حياتي مغامرة
1999	Miyye bil-Miyye	مية بالمية
2001	Ya Hanoun	يا حنون
2004	Je Suis Malade	—
2007	Ya Nasrallah	یا نصرالله
