= Nassif Zeytoun =

Nassif Zeytoun ناصيف زيتون
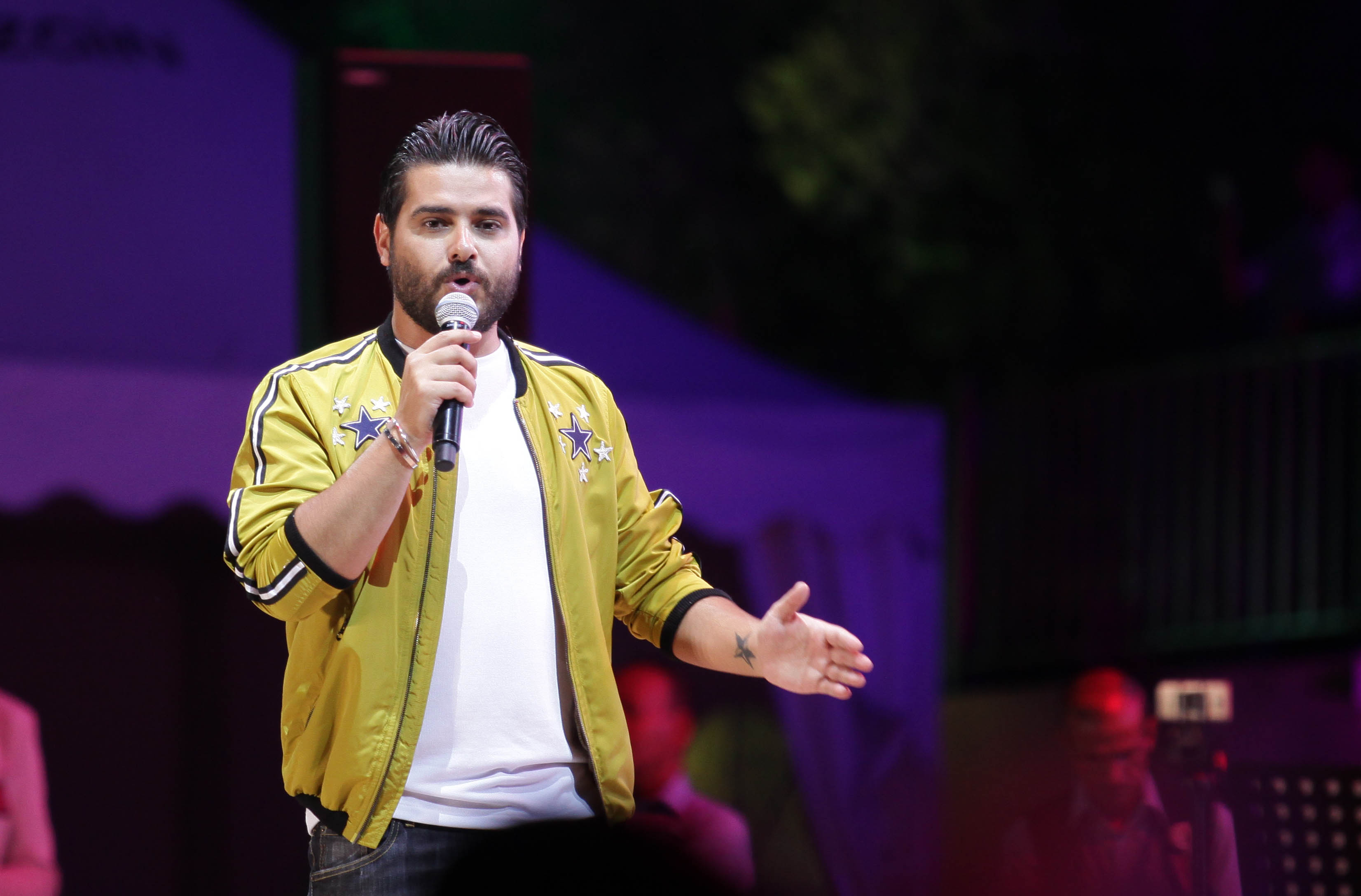
- Zeytoun at the Fuheis Festival in 2018

Background information
- Born: Nassif Elias Zeytoun ناصيف إلياس زيتون; 25 September 1988 (age 38); Jdeidat Artouz, Syria
- Genres: Arabic; Arabic pop music
- Occupations: Singer; musician
- Instruments: Oud; piano
- Years active: 2010–present
- Labels: Music Is My Life; Watary Production
- Spouse: Daniella Rahme (m. 2024)
- Website: nassifzeytoun.com

Nassif Elias Zeytoun (Arabic: ناصيف إلياس زيتون; born 25 September 1988) is a Syrian singer and the 2010 winner of the Arabic reality television show Star Academy. He is best known for his song "Mesh Aam Tezbat Maae", released in 2014. His music videos on YouTube have amassed millions of views. His album Toul Al Yom, released in July 2016, reached the top of the charts in the Arab world, with the song “Bi Rabbek” becoming an instant hit.

== Early life ==
Zeytoun was born and raised in Jdeidat Artouz, Rif Dimashq, to a Rum Orthodox Christian family originally from Khabab, Daraa Governorate. He studied interpretation before enrolling at the Higher Institute of Music in Damascus, where he graduated from the oriental singing department. Following his graduation, he worked at the Damascus Opera House and performed as a chorister with Marcel Khalife.

== Career ==
In 2010, Zeytoun was the first Syrian to ever enter the final and win Star Academy Arabia, receiving 65.21% of the final votes cast by viewers.

Zeytoun has also participated in Tomorrow/Bokra, a charity event produced by Quincy Jones and advertised by Shakira along with 23 other major Arab artists.

== Personal life ==
Zeytoun married Lebanese actress Daniella Rahme on 1 July 2024.

== Discography ==
=== Albums ===
==== Ya Samt (2013) ====
Year	Title
2013	Larmik Bibalash
2013	Sawt Rbaba
2013	Ya Tayr Alghroub
2013	Hiyi Li Ghamzetni
2013	Mani Zaalan
2013	Ya Ashikat Alward
2013	Elard Eli Btemshi Aleyha
2013	Ya Samt
2013	We Nweet
2013	Bado Ra’mek
2013	Sabrak Alayi
2014	Mish Am Tezbat Maii

==== Toul Al Yom (2016) ====
Year	Title
2016	Ana Jaye
2016	Khalas Estahi
2016	Tejawazti Hdodek
2016	Toul Al Yom
2016	Ala Ay Asas
2016	Mabrouk Alayki
2016	Shou Helo
2016	Kello Kezeb
2016	Endi Anaa
2017	Bi Rabbek

==== Enti W Ana (2021) ====
Year	Title
2020	Kezbi Wara Kezbi
2021	Enti W Ana
2021	Yalli Badha Yani
2021	Khat Ahmar

=== Singles ===
Year	Title
2015	Nami Aa Sadri
2016	Adda W Edoud
2016	Ma Wadaatak
2018	Mannou Sharet
2018	Haweety
2018	Badi Yaha
2019	Faregouni
2019	Wasellek Khabar
2019	Mesh Khayef Mennak
2019	Kermal Allah
2019	Kel Yom Bhebek
2019	Ana Maik
2019	Ma Bzon
2019	Takke
2019	Sallemi
2020	Ya Aasal
2020	Beirut
2022	Bel Ahlam
2025	Kazdoura

=== Charted songs ===
Title	Year	Peak chart positions		Album
Title	Year	LBN	MENA	Album
"Habibi W Bass"	2023	18	15	Bel Ahlam

=== Remixes ===
Year	Title
2021	Toul Al Yom (Harout Zadikian Remix)
