= Dina Azar =

Lebanese beauty queen

- Born: Dina Azar; July 4, 1973 (age 53); Hadath, Lebanon
- Occupations: Public figure, Producer, TV host, Jewelry designer, Actress
- Beauty pageant titleholder
- Title: Miss Lebanon 1995
- Major competitions: Miss Lebanon 1995 (Winner)

Dina Azar (Arabic: دينا عازار; born July 4, 1973) is a Lebanese beauty queen who was elected Miss Lebanon 1995.

== Career ==
Dina Azar holds a BA degree in English literature from the American University of Beirut and during a sabbatical year attended the American University of Paris to further study Comparative Literature and Finance. Moreover, she attended New York Film Academy and The Art Students League of New York.

Later on, she started a career in TV in which she hosted Celebrity Duets on LBC, Mahatat on Al Arabiya, Assraruha on Dubai TV, and high-profile pan Arab Events. As well as starring in Ramad w Meleh a pan Arab TV series.

She was elected as Miss Lebanon in 1995, and has been the face of brands in the Middle East.

She currently anchors shows on Dounia Dina, a pan Arab video based website.

== Personal life ==
Azar is single following a brief marriage that lasted a few months in 2012, and ended in a quick and difficult divorce from her ex-husband who lived in the U.S.
