= Till Death (Lebanese TV series) =

Lebanese drama

Till Death (Arabic: للموت) is a Lebanese drama which has aired since 2021.

== Plot ==
The marriage of Reem and Hadi is on the rocks. Reem remains silent and Hadi, on a business trip, has his life turned around when he meets a spontaneous woman.

== Cast ==
- Maguy Bou Ghosn as Sahar
- Daniella Rahme as Reem
- Mohammed Al-Ahmad as Hadi
- Khaled Al Qish as Basil
- Bassem Moughnieh as Omar

== Release ==
The show's first and second season were released on Shahid and Netflix. The third season aired on TV during Ramadan 2023, and is now available on Shahid and Netflix.

== Reception ==
The show received high viewer ratings during its first broadcast in 2021.

== See also ==
- Till Death (disambiguation)
