= Karim Rassi =

Lebanese politician

Karim Rassi (Arabic: كريم الراسي) is a Lebanese Greek Orthodox politician. He was born in Tripoli in 1967. He studied political science at the American University of Beirut. He is a member of the political bureau of the Marada Movement.

He was elected to parliament in 1994, filling the seat that was vacated when his father Abdullah Al Rassi. He was again elected to parliament in the 2000 elections.

Rassi is the son-in-law of the Lebanese academic Elie Salem.
