= Mayada El Hennawy =

Mayada El Hennawy ميادة الحناوي
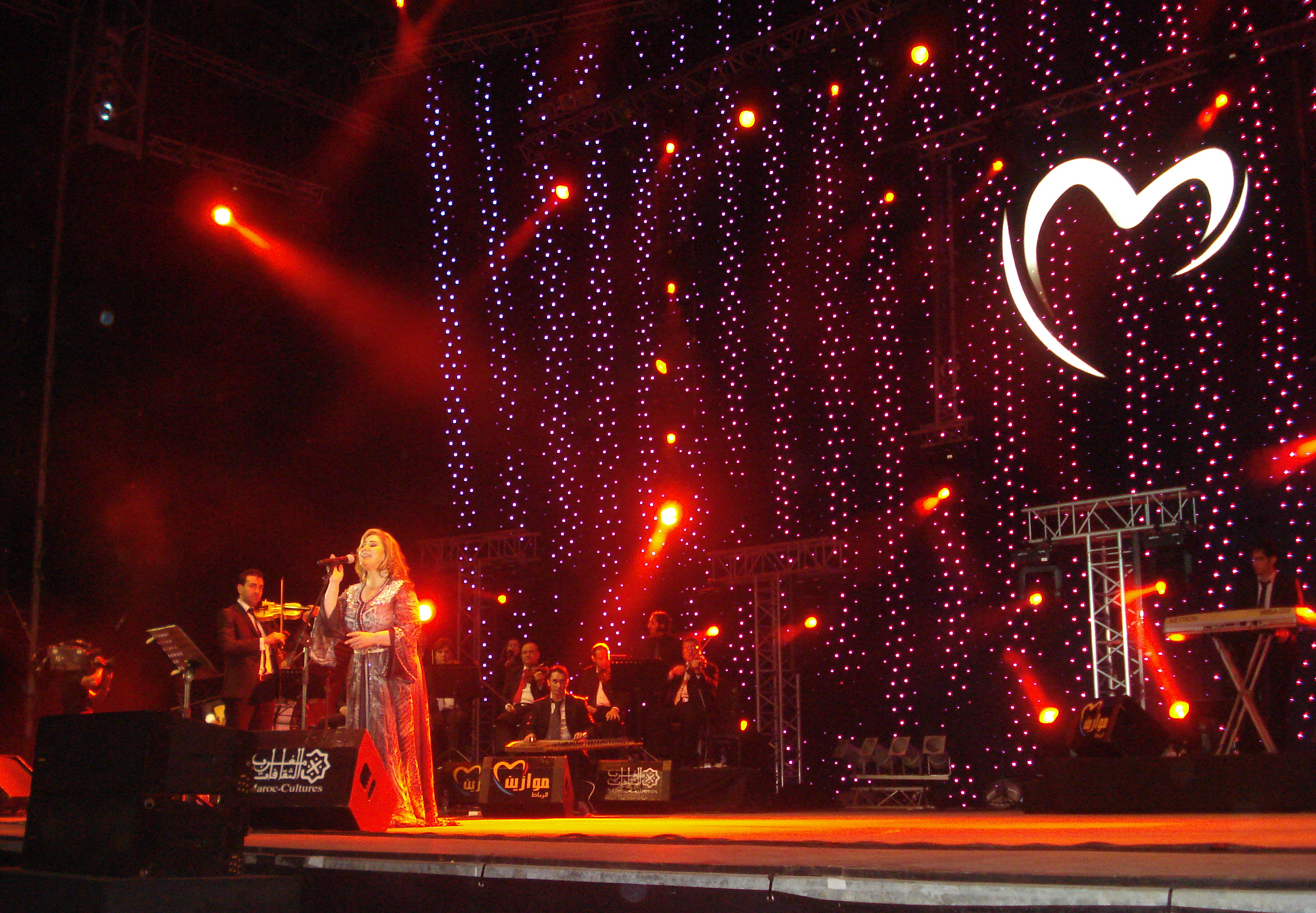
- Mayada El Hennawy during the Mawazine festival

Background information
- Also known as: Moutrabat el Jeel ("Singer of the Generation")
- Born: Mayada Bent Bakri El Ḥennawy; October 8, 1959 (age 66); Aleppo, Syria
- Origin: Syria
- Genres: Arab pop music, Tarab
- Occupation: Singer
- Instrument: Vocals
- Years active: 1977–present
- Labels: Alam El Phan, Voice of Beirut

Mayada El Hennawy (Arabic: ميادة الحناوي; born December 22, 1959) is a Syrian singer. She lived a big part of her life in Egypt where she collaborated with many famous Egyptian musical composers like Mohamed El Mougy and Mohamed Abdel Wahab, who created popular musicals of her songs.

== Career ==
Born Mayada Bent Bakri El Hennawy in a music-loving Christian family, she was discovered by Egyptian composer musician, and singer-songwriter Mohamed Abdel Wahab when at the age of 18, she was performing in Bloudan, Syria. Abdel Wahab named her "The Songstress of the Generation" (in Arabic مطربة الجيل transliterated as Moutribat el Jeel). and invited her to Egypt to write songs for her. Mayada's sister Faten was also a very promising singer as well. El Hennawy cooperated with some of the biggest known Egyptian lyricists and music composers, including Abdel Wahab and Mohammed El Mougy.

Mayada is Melkite Catholic.

But her biggest launch as a pan-Arab singer came with her collaboration with songwriter Baligh Hamdi in the 1980s. Her most famous songs from Hamdi include "Ana Ba'sha'ak", "El Hob illi Kan", "Ana A'mel Eh", "Sidi Ana", "Indi Kalam" etc. Riad El Sounbati also composed for El Hennawy.

In her earlier career, she also sang songs written by Mohammed Sultan, Hilmi Bakr, and Jamal Salameh, and in the 1990s, Sami El Hefnawi, Salah al Sharnoubi, Mohammed Sultan, Ammar El Sherei, Khaled Al-Amir. She was promoted by Egyptian music promoter Mohsen Jaber, owner of Alam El Fan record label and Mazzika music station.

During the Anwar Sadat and early years of the Hosni Mubarak regimes in Egypt, she was reportedly forbidden from coming to Egypt. Despite that, Mayada El Hennawy has performed in some of the biggest music festivals in Syria and the Arab World, has appeared in great number of television specials, sang in praise of Damascus in "Ya Sham" and in praise of Beirut in "Beyrouth Ya Arous el Sharq" and in the operette composed by Haitham Ziad entitled "Yeslam Trabak Ya Sham" with some of the biggest Arab stars, Hani Shaker, Latifa, Assi El Helani etc.

After her album Touba, she went on a hiatus for many years, surfacing only with some Arab nationalist songs on certain occasions for Syria, Palestine, Algeria, Tunisia, Kurdistan etc. But later launched a new album in 2007 that includes a song written by Baligh Hamdi and originally destined to be sung by Oum Kulthoum. She has also been very verbal in supporting the Bashar al-Assad government, which reportedly led to Kuwaiti authorities banning her from a concert scheduled during the Hala Febrayer music festival in Kuwait. El Hennawi is planning a huge comeback reportedly with new albums with Alam El Fan.
