= Georges Al Rassi =

Lebanese musical artist (1980–2022)

- Born: 29 January 1980; Cheikh Taba, Akkar District, Lebanon
- Died: 27 August 2022 (aged 42); Masnaa Border Crossing
- Occupations: Actor; singer; songwriter; model
- Years active: 1995–2022
- Spouse: Joelle Hatem (m. 2014; div. 2015)
- Children: 1
- Musical career
- Genre: Arabic pop
- Instruments: Vocals, guitar, drums, banjo, violin, harmonica, accordion, synthesizer

Georges Al Rassi (Arabic: جورج الراسي; 29 January 1980 – 27 August 2022) was a Lebanese actor, singer, model, musician, and songwriter born into a distinctively artistic family.

== Biography ==
HHis father, Khalil, played the oud, while his mother was Aramean from Marmarita. His sisters, [[Nadine Al Rassi|Nadine]] and Sandrine, are both actors and singers.

At 16 years old, Georges Al Rassi won his first contract: a six-month agreement to perform at Options, an international nightclub in Kaslik, Lebanon.

On 27 August 2022, he died in a car accident at the Masnaa Border Crossing along with a companion, Zeina Al-Meraabi, while returning to Lebanon from Syria.

He was married to Joelle Hatem with whom he had a son, Joe.

== Discography ==
Albums

- 1996: Sahr al Layl
- 1998: Hikaya
- 2000: Jay Te' Tezer
- 2001: Wala Yomken
- 2002: Sibt el Hadaf
- 2003: Kif Awsefak
- 2011: Hamdellah Aal Salama (mini album)

Singles

- 2004: Kif Mfareqna
- 2005: Andek Shek
- 2006: Inta El Hob
- 2007: El Hob El Majnoun
- 2008: Laayonak Habibi
- 2009: Men Yom Hawak (Albi Mat)
- 2010: Inta Ekhtyari
- 2012: Temrou Tetghandar
- 2013: Jayi La'andek
- 2013: Min Allak
- 2016: Wahdik Enti

== Videography ==
Official music videos
Year	Title	Album	Director
2009	Albi Mat	Non-album single	Fadi Haddad
2012	Temro2 Tetghandar	Non-album single	Fadi Haddad
2015	Enta El Woujoud	Non-album single	Walid Nassif
2016	Wahdik Enti	Non-album single	Hamid Merhi
