= Tarek Abou Jaoude =

Tarek Abou Jaoude طارق أبو جودة
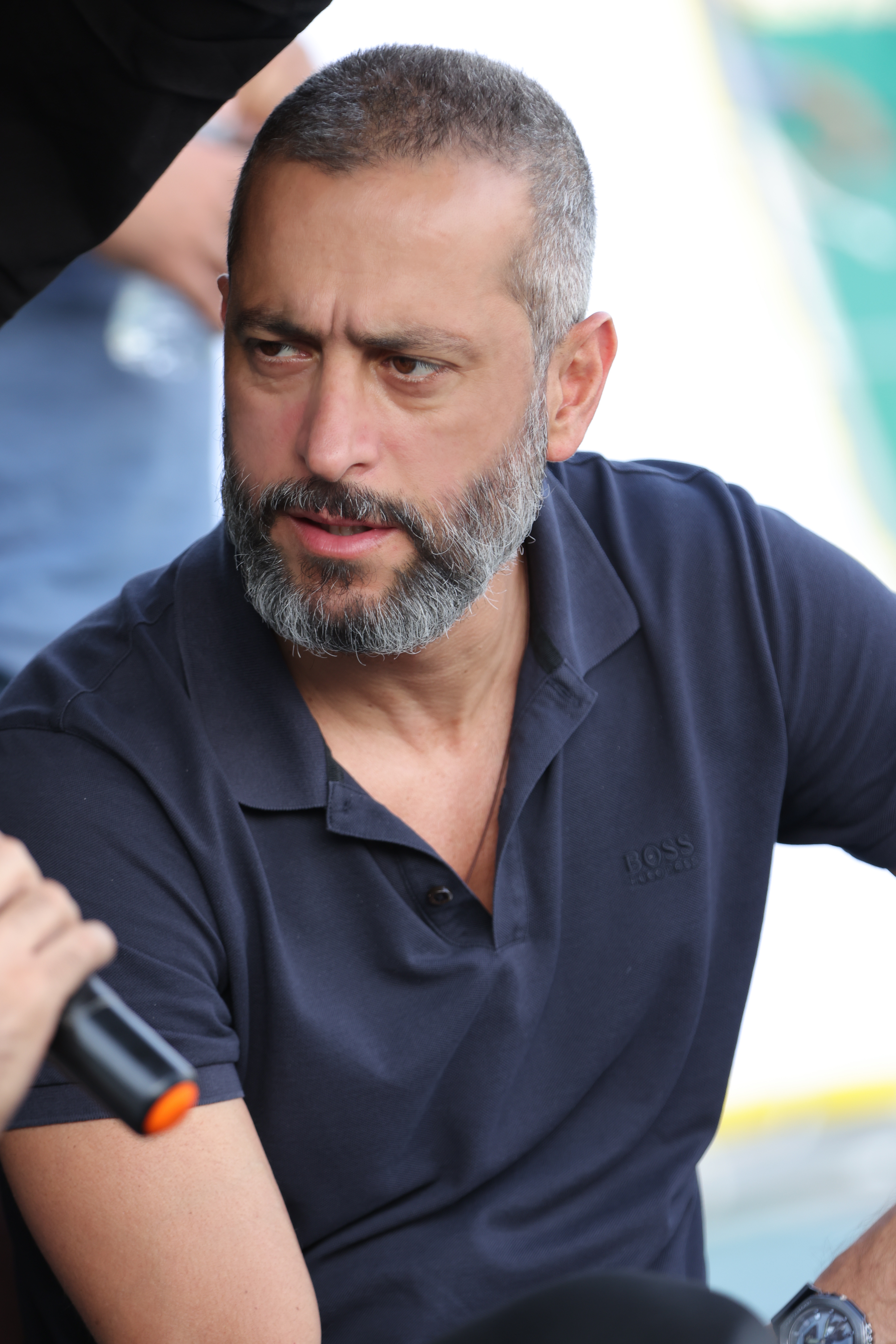

Background information
- Born: 18 February 1974 (age 52); Zalka, Lebanon
- Occupations: Music artist manager, entrepreneur

Tarek Abou Jaoude (or Jaoudeh; Arabic: طارق أبو جودة; born 18 February 1974) is a Lebanese music manager and entrepreneur. Abou Jaoude managed Lebanese singer Najwa Karam for 15 years, during which, Karam achieved new career heights. In 2008, he co-founded HuManagement, a music management and marketing company, collaborating with some of the Arab World's best known artists such as Majida El Roumi, Kadim Al Sahir, Dalia Mubarak, and Nassif Zeytoun.

== Biography ==
Tarek Hafez Abou Jaoude was born on February 18, 1974, in Zalka, Lebanon. He began his career in 2002 as the manager of Lebanese artist Najwa Karam; the long-standing collaboration helped Karam achieve career highlights and a wider audience. In 2008, he co-founded HuManagement, a talent management and marketing agency, in partnership with Lebanese businessman Hadi Hajjar. The company expanded to the United Arab Emirates in 2016, Jordan in 2020, and to Saudi Arabia in 2022. The four affiliated companies were consolidated under the HuManagement Holding DIFC Dubai. In September 2017, Abou Jaoude announced his resignation from managing the affairs of Karam. Both Abou Jaoude and Karam issued statements emphasizing that the decision was made amicably and that they will continue to have a positive relationship. In 2020, Abou Jaoude founded Katch Investments, which is engaged in the development of mobile education and gaming software applications. In 2023, he founded the United Arab Emirates-based car rental company Katch Me.
