= Halim =

Halim or Haleem (Arabic: حليم) is an Arabic masculine given name which means gentle, forbearing, mild, patient, understanding, indulgent, slow to anger. In Islam, al-Halīm is one of the Names of God in Islam.

Abdul Halim or Abdel Halim or Abdelhalim or alternatives with Haleem mean servant of God, as thus described, and bearers of that name are listed on that page.

Halim is also used as an abbreviated version of "Abdul Halim", or independently, as a name given to a male.

== Md Halim ==
- Halim (name)

=== Given name ===
- Abdul Halim of Kedah, Malaysian former King
- Halim Barakat, Syrian novelist
- Halim Benmabrouk, Algerian footballer
- Halim El-Dabh, American composer
- Halim Haryanto, Indonesian / American badminton player
- Halim Perdanakusuma, Indonesian aviator and national hero, after whom Halim Perdanakusuma International Airport is named
- Halim Medaci, Algerian footballer
- Said Halim Pasha, Ottoman Empire Grand Vizier
- Halim Saad, Malaysian businessman
- Halim Othman, Malaysian radio and television announcer
- Halim Perdanakusuma International Airport, International airport in Jakarta

=== Last name ===
- Asma Halim, Egyptian writer and journalist
- Helmy Halim, Egyptian filmmaker
- Mustafa Ben Halim, ex-Prime Minister of Libya
- Rachman Halim, Indonesian businessman
- Norman Abdul Halim, Malaysian musician
- Edry Abdul Halim, Malaysian actor

== Haleem ==
=== Given name ===
- Haleem Brohi, Pakistani author
- Haleem Chaudhri, Bengali cricketer

=== Surname ===
- Aamer Haleem, Canadian radio and television personality
- Mohammad Haleem, Pakistani judge

== See also ==
- Haleem, a type of stew popular in the Middle East, Central Asia, and the Indian subcontinent
- Halima (disambiguation) or Halime and variants, feminine form of Halim
