= Abd al-Halim =

ʻAbd al-Ḥalīm (ALA-LC romanization of Arabic: عبد الحليم) is a male Muslim given name, and in modern usage, surname. It is built from the Arabic words ʻabd and al-Ḥalīm, one of the names of God in the Qur'an, which gives rise to the Muslim theophoric names. It means "servant of the all-clement".

It may refer to:

== Mononym ==
- Abdul Halim of Kedah (1927–2017), Yang di-Pertuan Agong of Malaysia
- Abdul Hamid Halim of Kedah (1864–1943), 26th Sultan of Kedah
- Abdul Halim (Indonesia) (1911–1988), 4th Prime Minister of Indonesia
- Abdul Halim Bukhari (1945–2022), Bangladeshi Islamic scholar
- Abdul Halim (cricketer) (born 1998), Bangladeshi cricketer

== Given name ==
=== Abdel Halim ===
- Abdel Halim Ali (born 1973), Egyptian footballer
- Abdel Halim Hafez (1929–1977), Egyptian singer and actor
- Abdel Halim Muhammad (1910–2009), Sudanese doctor and administrator
- Abdel Halim Hassan, Egyptian footballer
- Abdel Halim Messaoudi, Tunisian writer

=== Abdel-Halim ===
- Abdel-Halim Caracalla (born 1940), Lebanese dance company director
- Abdel-Halim Mahmoud (1910–1978), Egyptian Grand Imam of Al Azhar
- Abdel-Halim Nowera (died 1985), Egyptian conductor and impresario

=== Abdelhalim ===
- Abdelhalim El-Kholti, known as Abdou El-Kholti (born 1980), Moroccan-French footballer
- Abdelhalim Ouradi (born 1981), Algerian boxer

=== Abdul Halim ===
- Abdul Halim (Dinajpur politician)
- Abdul Halim (Indonesia), former Prime Minister of Indonesia
- Abdul Halim (communist) (1901–1966), Indian politician and activist
- Abdul Halim (cricketer) (born 1998), Bangladeshi cricketer
- Abdul Halim (nationalist) (1887–1962), Indonesian Islamic scholar and nationalist
- Abdul Halim (Jessore politician)
- Abdul Halim Bukhari, Bangladeshi Islamic Scholar
- Abdul Halim Abdul Rahman, Malaysian politician
- Abdul Halim Abdul Samad, Malaysian politician, senator and businessman
- Abdul Halim Chowdhury, Bangladeshi politician
- Abdul Halim Ghaznavi (1876–1953), Bengali Muslim League politician
- Abdul Halim Haron, Singaporean bodybuilder
- Abdul Halim Hussain, Malaysian politician
- Abdul Halim Iskandar, Indonesian politician
- Abdul Halim Khaddam (1932–2020), Syrian politician
- Abdul Halim Khan, Pakistani politician, Muslim cleric
- Abdul Halim Jaffer Khan (1929–2017), Indian sitar player
- Mirza Abdul Halim Mirza Abdul Majid (1966–1989), Singaporean police officer
- Abdul Halim Mohd Hanifah (born 1965), Bruneian military officer
- Abdul Halim Moussa (c. 1930–2003), Egyptian police major general and interior minister
- Abdul Halim Pardede (1886–1958), Indonesian Islamic cleric
- Abdul Halim Sadiqi (born c. 1968), Pakistani prisoner in Guantanamo
- Abdul Halim Saari (born 1994), Malaysian footballer
- Abdul Halim Sharar (1869–1926), Indian essayist and historian
- Abdul Halim Tokmakçioğlu (born 1913), Turkish Olympic fencer
- Abdul Halim Zainal (born 1988), Malaysian footballer
- Mohammad Abdul Halim, Bangladeshi footballer
- Md. Abdul Halim, Bangladeshi politician

=== Abdul-Halim ===
- Abdul-Halim Sadulayev (1966–2006), President of the Chechen Republic of Ichkeria

=== Abd al-Halim ===
- Abd al-Halim Abu Ghazala (1930–2008), Egyptian soldier and politician

=== Abdul Haleem ===
- Abdul Haleem Chaudhri (died 1971), Bengali cricketer
- Abdul Haleem Chishti (1929–2020), Pakistani Islamic scholar
- Abdul Haleem Chowdhury (1928–1987), Bangladeshi politician

== Surname ==
=== Abdel Halim ===
- Moustafa Ali Abdel Halim (born 1943), Egyptian weightlifter
- Abdel Halim Mohamed, (1910–2009), Sudanese physician and politician

=== Abdel-Halim ===
- Ahmad Abdel-Halim (born 1986), Jordanian footballer of Palestinian origin
- Aziza Abdel-Halim, President of the Muslim Women's National Network Australia

=== Abdel-Haleem ===
- Muhammad Abdel-Haleem, Egyptian academic working in London

=== Abdelhaleem ===
- Shareef Abdelhaleem (born c. 1979), Egyptian-Canadian accused of terrorism
- Abdelmahmood Abdelhaleem, Sudanese diplomat

=== Abdul Halim ===
- Ahmad Fairuz Abdul Halim (born 1941), Chief Justice of the Federal Court of Malaysia
- Badrulzaman Abdul Halim (born 1978), Malaysian footballer
- Edry, Norman and Yusry Abdul Halim, three brothers and members of Malaysian pop boy band KRU
- Hashim Abdul Halim (1935–2015), Indian politician
- M. H. A. Haleem (born 1956), Sri Lankan politician
- Nik Shahrul Azim Abdul Halim (born 1990), Malaysian footballer

=== Abdul-Haleem ===
- Ahmed Abdul-Haleem (born 1986), Jordanian footballer

== Other uses ==
- Sultan Abdul Halim Airport, Kedah, Malaysia
- Sultan Abdul Halim Highway, Kedah, Malaysia
- Sultan Abdul Halim Hospital, Kedah, Malaysia
- Sultan Abdul Halim Mu'adzam Shah Gallery, Kedah, Malaysia
- Sultan Abdul Halim Muadzam Shah Bridge, Penang, Malaysia
- SM Sultan Abdul Halim, school near Kedah, Malaysia
- Sultan Abdul Halim ferry terminal bridge collapse, 1988 disaster in Malaysia

== See also ==
- Halim (name)
