= Halim (disambiguation) =

Halim or Haleem is one of the names of God in Islam and as such is a male Muslim name or surname.

Halim or Haleem may also refer to:

- Halim (album), a 1997 Belgian record by Natacha Atlas
- Halim (film), a 2006 film
- Halim Alizehi, village in Iran
- Halim railway station, a railway station complex in Jakarta, Indonesia
- Haleem, a type of stew popular in the Middle East, Central Asia, and the Indian subcontinent

== See also ==
- Halima (disambiguation)
- Abdul Halim, a given name and surname
