= Halim (name) =

Halim or Haleem (Arabic: حليم) is an Arabic masculine given name which means gentle, forbearing, mild, patient, understanding, indulgent, slow to anger, "what we call a civilized man".

In Islam, Al-Halīm is one of the 99 names of God, with that meaning, but is in the definite article ("Al-" prefix).

Abdul Halim or Abdel Halim means servant of God, as thus described, and bearers of that name are listed on that page.

Halim is also a Chinese Indonesian surname based on Lim (林).

== Given name ==
Halim is also used as an abbreviated version of Abdul Halim, or independently, as a name given to a male. Examples of that are:

- Halim Bukhari, Bangladeshi Deobandi scholar
- Halim Barakat, Syrian novelist
- Halim Benmabrouk, Algerian footballer
- Haleem Brohi, Pakistani author
- Haleem Chaudhri, Bengali cricketer
- Halim El-Dabh, American composer
- Halim Haryanto, Indonesian / American badminton player
- Halim Perdanakusuma, Indonesian aviator and national hero, after whom Halim Perdanakusuma International Airport is named
- Halim Medaci, Algerian footballer
- Said Halim Pasha, Ottoman Empire Grand Vizier
- Halim Saad, Malaysian businessman

== Surname ==
Halim may also be a last name:

- Helmy Halim, Egyptian filmmaker
- Melanie Fiona Hallim, Canadian-Guyanese singer
- Mohammad Haleem, Pakistani judge
- Mustafa Ben Halim (1921–2021), ex-prime minister of Libya
- Natasha Mannuela Halim, Miss World Indonesia 2016
- Rachman Halim, Indonesian businessman

== See also ==
- Lim (disambiguation)
