= Alissar Caracalla =

Lebanese dancer and choreographer

Alissar Caracalla أليسار كركلا
- Born: Alissar Abdel-Halim Caracalla; February 26, 1974 (age 52)
- Years active: 1990s-Present
- Spouse: Nael Chehab (m. 2012)
- Children: 1
- Parent: Abdel-Halim Caracalla

Alissar Abdel-Halim Caracalla is a Lebanese dance instructor, choreographer and art director. She is the founder and director of the Orientalist Dance Company and CDS, the Caracalla School of Dance, which is simply known as "Studio Caracalla: L'art de la Danse." Caracalla is the daughter of Abdel-Halim Caracalla the founder of the Caracalla Dance Theatre.

== Biography ==
Caracalla was born 1974 on February 26 in Lebanon. Her father, Abdel-Halim Caracalla a Shiite Muslim from Baalbek, married her mother, a Christian from Zahle, in a church. She spent the duration of the Lebanese Civil War growing up in London.

At the age of 18, she moved to the United States.

=== Education ===
She received her BA in International Communications and Choreography from Loyola Marymount University in Los Angeles and her master's degree in Fine Arts in Dance Theory and Choreography at UCLA.

== Career ==
In 2005, she choreographed the dance sequels in Philippe Aractingi's feature film, Bosta.

In 2011, she joined forces with Kunhadi to raise road safety awareness in Lebanon and became one of their four ambassadors for the Decade of Action for Road Safety 2011–2020 in Lebanon. Additionally, she was the dance instructor and choreographer in the reality TV show Star Academy Lebanon.

== Personal life ==
She lived in Los Angeles for several years. Currently, she lives in London and Beirut.

Caracalla is married to Nael Chehab an aerospace engineer and founder of the business PrivaSky. They had their wedding in Cyprus in 2012. She gave birth to their first child in 2017. In addition to Lebanese Arabic, she is a fluent speaker of French and English.
