= Avro Anson =

1935 multi-role military aircraft family by Avro

Anson
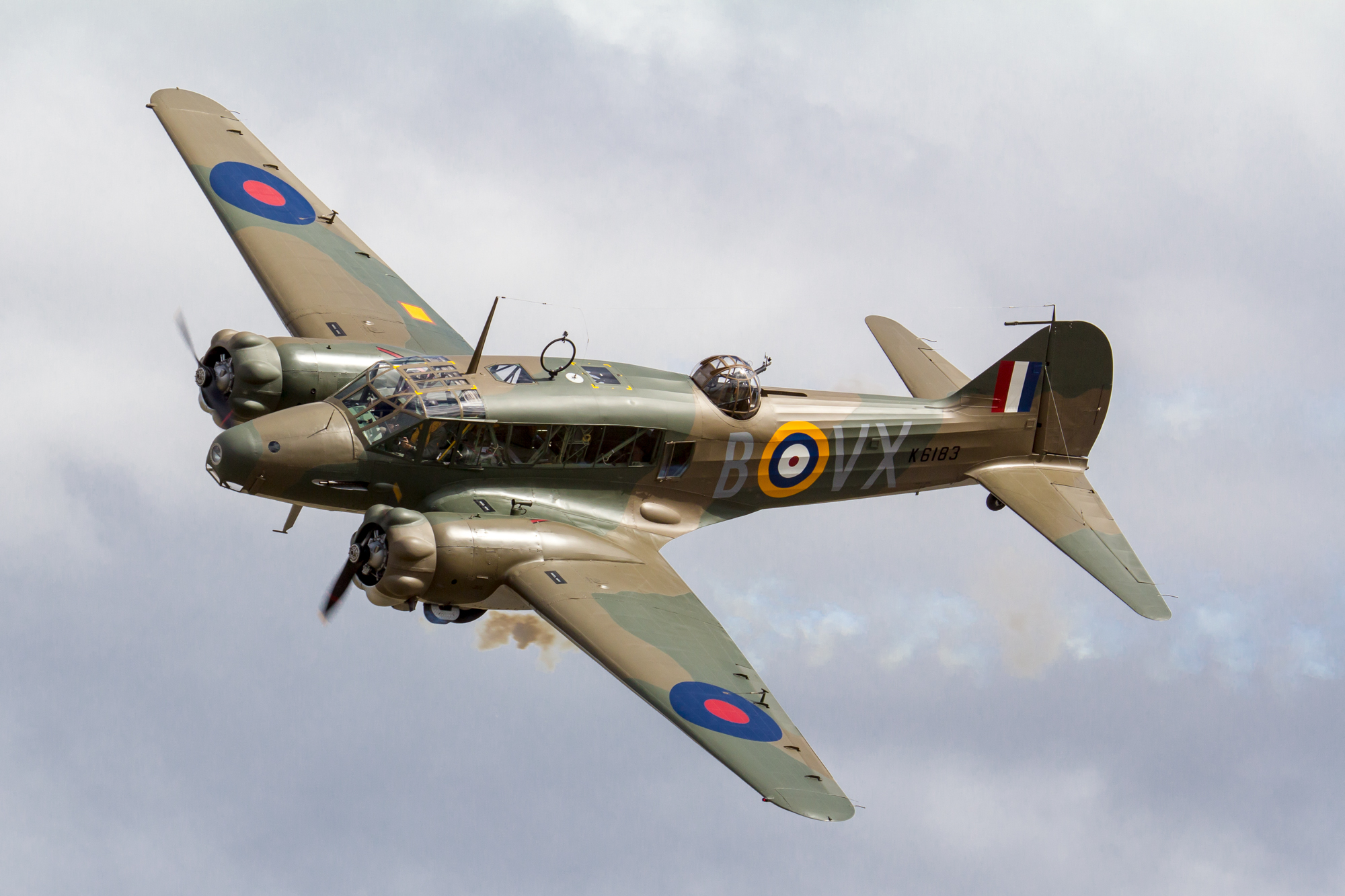
- Avro Anson ZK-RRA in flight, Classic Fighters Airshow (2015)

General information
- Type: Multirole aircraft, primarily a trainer
- National origin: United Kingdom
- Manufacturer: Avro (UK) / Federal Aircraft Limited (Canada)
- Primary users: Royal Air Force Fleet Air Arm; Royal Canadian Air Force; Royal Australian Air Force
- Number built: 11,020

History
- Manufactured: 1930s–1952
- Introduction date: 1936
- First flight: 24 March 1935
- Retired: 28 June 1968 (RAF)
- Developed from: Avro 652

The Avro Anson is a British twin-engine, multi-role aircraft built by the aircraft manufacturer Avro. Large numbers served in a variety of roles with the Royal Air Force (RAF), Fleet Air Arm (FAA), Royal Canadian Air Force (RCAF), Royal Australian Air Force (RAAF), and numerous other air forces before, during, and after the Second World War.

Originally designated the Avro 652A, the Anson was developed during the mid-1930s from the earlier Avro 652 airliner in response to an Air Ministry request for tender for a coastal maritime reconnaissance aircraft. After impressing the Air Ministry during evaluation, a single prototype was ordered and made its maiden flight on 24 March 1935. Following trials in which the Type 652A outperformed the competing de Havilland DH.89, it was selected for production. This led to Air Ministry Specification G.18/35 being written around the design, and an initial order for 174 aircraft was placed in July 1935. The Type 652A was subsequently named Anson after the British Admiral George Anson.

The Anson entered service with the RAF in its intended maritime reconnaissance role, operating alongside larger flying boats. After the outbreak of the Second World War, however, it quickly became obsolete as a front-line combat aircraft. It was instead widely employed as a multi-engine aircrew trainer, proving well suited to the role and becoming one of the main training aircraft of the British Commonwealth Air Training Plan. The type remained in this role throughout and after the war, serving with the RAF as a trainer and communications aircraft until 28 June 1968.

After the war, a small number of new-build aircraft, known as the Avro 19, were produced for the civilian market. Many more surplus military aircraft were converted for civil use as light transports and executive aircraft. By the end of production in 1952, Avro had built 8,138 Ansons in nine variants, while a further 2,882 aircraft were manufactured in Canada by Federal Aircraft Ltd from 1941. By the 21st century, almost all Ansons had been retired, although three aircraft continue to appear at flying displays.

== Development ==
In 1933, the British Air Ministry proposed acquiring a relatively inexpensive landplane for coastal maritime reconnaissance duties to supplement the more capable, but significantly more expensive, flying boats then used by the Royal Air Force (RAF). The Ministry invited proposals from British aircraft manufacturers. Avro responded with the Avro 652A, a modified version of its earlier Avro 652, a twin-engined, six-seat monoplane airliner. de Havilland submitted a design based on its D.H.89A Dragon Rapide biplane. After considering the submissions, the Air Ministry ordered one prototype each of the Type 652A and the de Havilland DH.89 for evaluation in late 1934, with a production decision scheduled for May 1935.

On 24 March 1935, the Avro 652A made its maiden flight from Woodford Aerodrome, Greater Manchester. Between 11 and 17 May 1935, the prototype underwent formal evaluation against the competing DH.89M by the RAF's Coastal Defence Development Unit at RAF Gosport, Hampshire. During the trials, the Avro design proved superior and was selected as the winner on 25 May 1935. In response, Air Ministry Specification G.18/35 was written around the Type 652A. An initial order for 174 aircraft, by then named Anson, was placed in July 1935.

The first production Anson made its maiden flight on 31 December 1935. Compared with the prototype, production aircraft featured an enlarged horizontal tailplane and a reduced elevator span to improve stability. Although the prototype had not been fitted with flaps, production aircraft were designed to accommodate them from the outset, improving the approach angle and reducing landing speed. Deliveries to the RAF began on 6 March 1936.

By the end of production in 1952, a total of 11,020 Ansons had been completed, making it the second most-produced British multi-engined aircraft of the Second World War after the Vickers Wellington, of which approximately 11,500 were built.

== Design ==
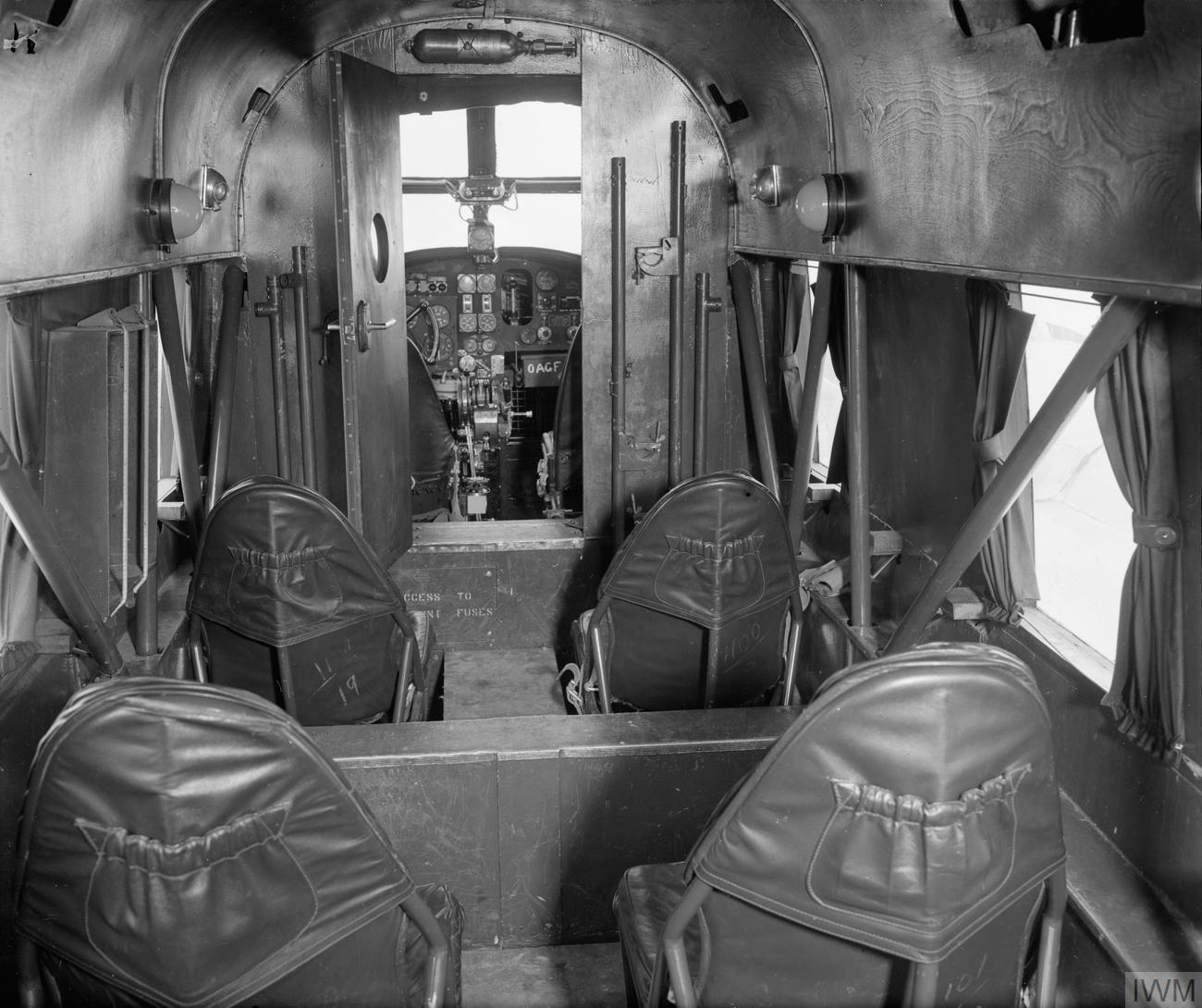
The interior of an Anson C Mark XI, looking forward from the passenger compartment towards the cockpit. The wing spar is visible between the first and second row of passenger seats.

The Avro Anson was a twin-engine, low-wing cantilever monoplane. Developed as a general reconnaissance aircraft, it possessed many features that lent itself to the role, including considerable load-carrying ability, and long range. The structure of the Anson was relatively straightforward and uncomplicated, relying on proven methods and robust construction to produce an airframe that minimised maintenance requirements. Much of the internal structure retained similarities to the earlier Avro 652 airliner from which it had been developed. The Anson Mk I was furnished with a low-mounted one-piece wooden wing, composed of a combination of plywood and spruce throughout the wingbox and ribs. The fuselage was composed of a welded steel tubing framework which was principally clad in fabric; the exterior of the nose was clad in magnesium alloy.

The Anson was powered by a pair of Armstrong Siddeley Cheetah IX seven-cylinder air-cooled radial engines, which were each rated at 350 horsepower (260 kW). Each engine was provided with its own duplicated fuel pumps and separate fuel and oil tanks; the tanks were composed of welded aluminium and mounted in cradles housed within the wing. The engine cowlings were intentionally designed to have a reduced diameter in order to reduce their negative impact on external visibility, which was considered to be valuable to the type's reconnaissance function. These engines drove two-bladed Fairey-built metal propellers.

The Anson was the first aircraft equipped with retractable landing gear to enter service with the RAF. While the main undercarriage was retracted into recesses set into the bottom of the engine nacelles, the tail wheel was fixed in position. Commonly, the undercarriage was fitted with Dunlop-built wheels, tyres and pneumatic brakes and Turner legs. The retractable undercarriage was mechanically operated by hand; 144 turns of a crank handle, situated beside the pilot's seat, were needed. To avoid this laborious process, early aircraft would often perform short flights with the landing gear remaining extended throughout, which would reduce the aircraft's cruising speed by 30 mph (50 km/h).

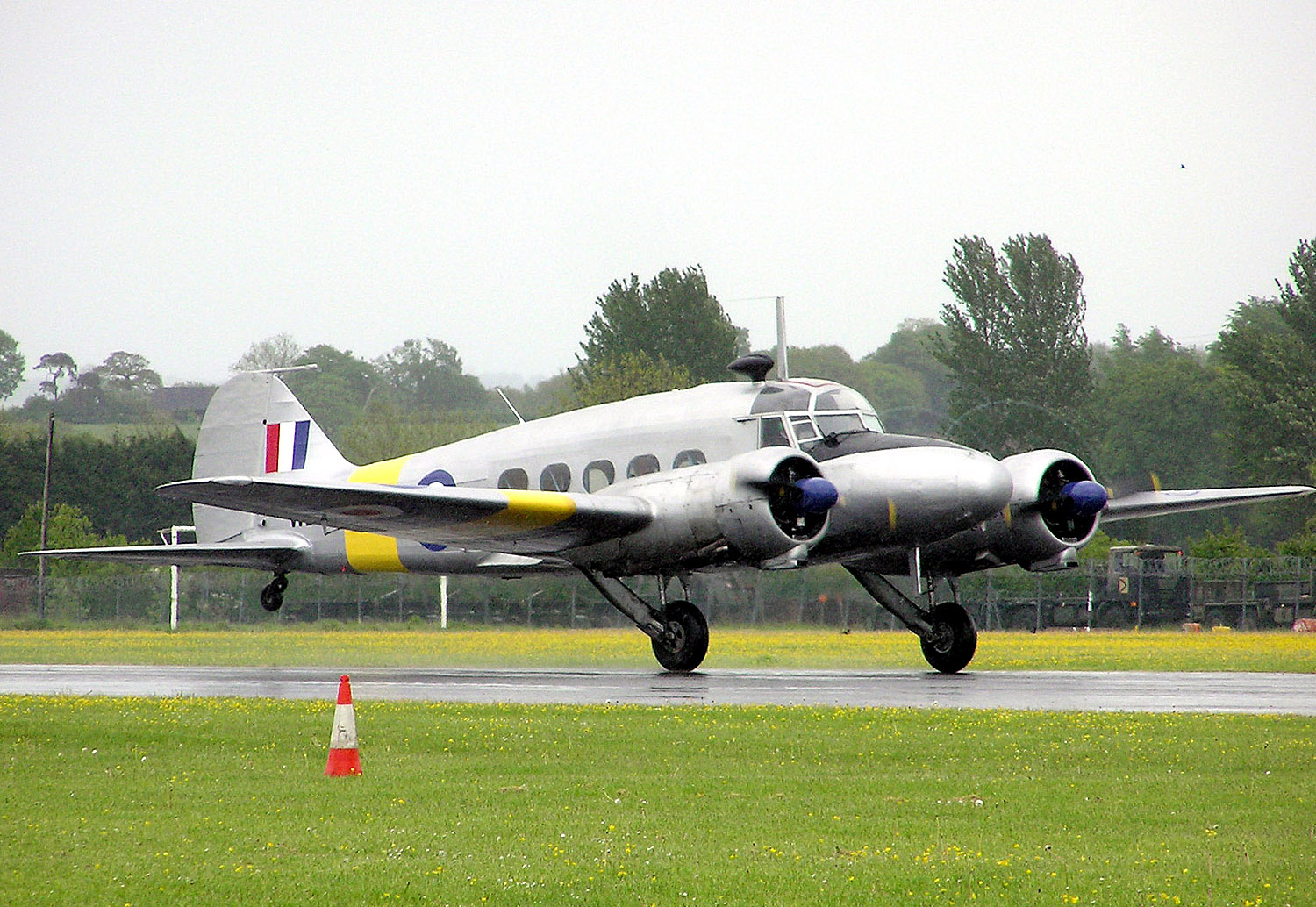
G-VROE, a preserved Anson C.21 operated by the Classic Air Force, 2005

Initially, the Anson was flown by a crew of three, which comprised a pilot, a navigator/bomb-aimer and a radio operator/gunner, when it was used in the maritime reconnaissance role; from 1938 onwards, it was typically operated by a four-man crew. The bomb-aimer would perform his function from a prone position in the forward section of the nose, which was provisioned with a bombsight, driftsight, and other appropriate instrumentation, including a landing light. The pilot was located in a cockpit behind the bomb aimer's position and was provided with a variety of contemporary instrumentation, including those to enable flight under instrument flight rules (IFR) and indirect instrument lighting for night flying purposes.

Immediately behind the pilot's position is a small folding seat fixed to the starboard side of the fuselage for an additional crew member or passenger, along with racks that would contain a pair of parachute packs that would be clipped onto the harnesses worn by both the pilot and the navigator. Behind these is the navigator's station, a chair and table provisioned with navigational aids such as compasses, Bigsworth chart boards, sea markers, slide rules for course, wind and speed, a signalling lamp and float flares. Aft of the rear spar is the wireless operator's station – a table with contemporary wireless equipment, including a winch for the trailing aerial, which was attached to the upper fuselage immediately behind the aircraft's cockpit.

The armaments of the Anson consisted of a single .303 in (7.7 mm) Vickers machine gun which was fixed within the forward fuselage and aimed by the pilot, while an Armstrong Whitworth-built manually operated gun turret located on the Anson's dorsal section was fitted with a single Lewis gun. Additionally, up to 360 pounds (160 kg) of bombs, which could consist of a maximum of two 100 pounds (45 kg) and eight 20 pounds (9 kg) bombs, could be carried in the aircraft's wings. Those Ansons that were used in the training role were outfitted with dual controls and usually had the gun turret removed, although specific aircraft used for gunnery training were fitted with a Bristol hydraulically operated gun turret, similar to that used in the Bristol Blenheim. The tail fairing of the starboard nacelle contains an inflatable dinghy which is provided with automatic actuators and marine distress beacons.

== Operational history ==
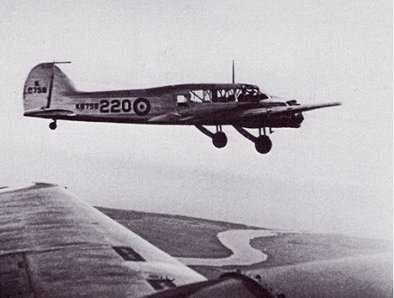
RAF Ansons conducting trials with airborne radar in 1937.

On 6 March 1936, the Anson entered RAF service with No. 48 Squadron, the first RAF unit to be equipped with the type. Its introduction marked a significant advance in capability, serving not only as a general reconnaissance aircraft but also as an effective general-purpose aircraft. In July 1937, a Coastal Command Anson was fitted with an experimental airborne early warning radar capable of detecting large warships 5 miles (8.0 km) away in poor visibility. The system was successfully used during fleet exercises off the east coast of England in September.

By the outbreak of the Second World War, the RAF had received 824 Ansons. Twenty-six RAF squadrons operated the Anson I: 10 with Coastal Command and 16 with Bomber Command. By 1939, all Bomber Command squadrons equipped with the Anson I had become operational training units responsible for preparing crews for frontline service. Twelve of these squadrons formed part of No. 6 (Operational Training) Group. Newly formed crews, having completed their individual flying and technical training, received bomber crew instruction in Ansons before converting to frontline aircraft within the same squadrons. They then progressed to operational bomber squadrons equipped with aircraft such as the Fairey Battle, Bristol Blenheim, Vickers Wellington, Armstrong Whitworth Whitley, and Handley Page Hampden.

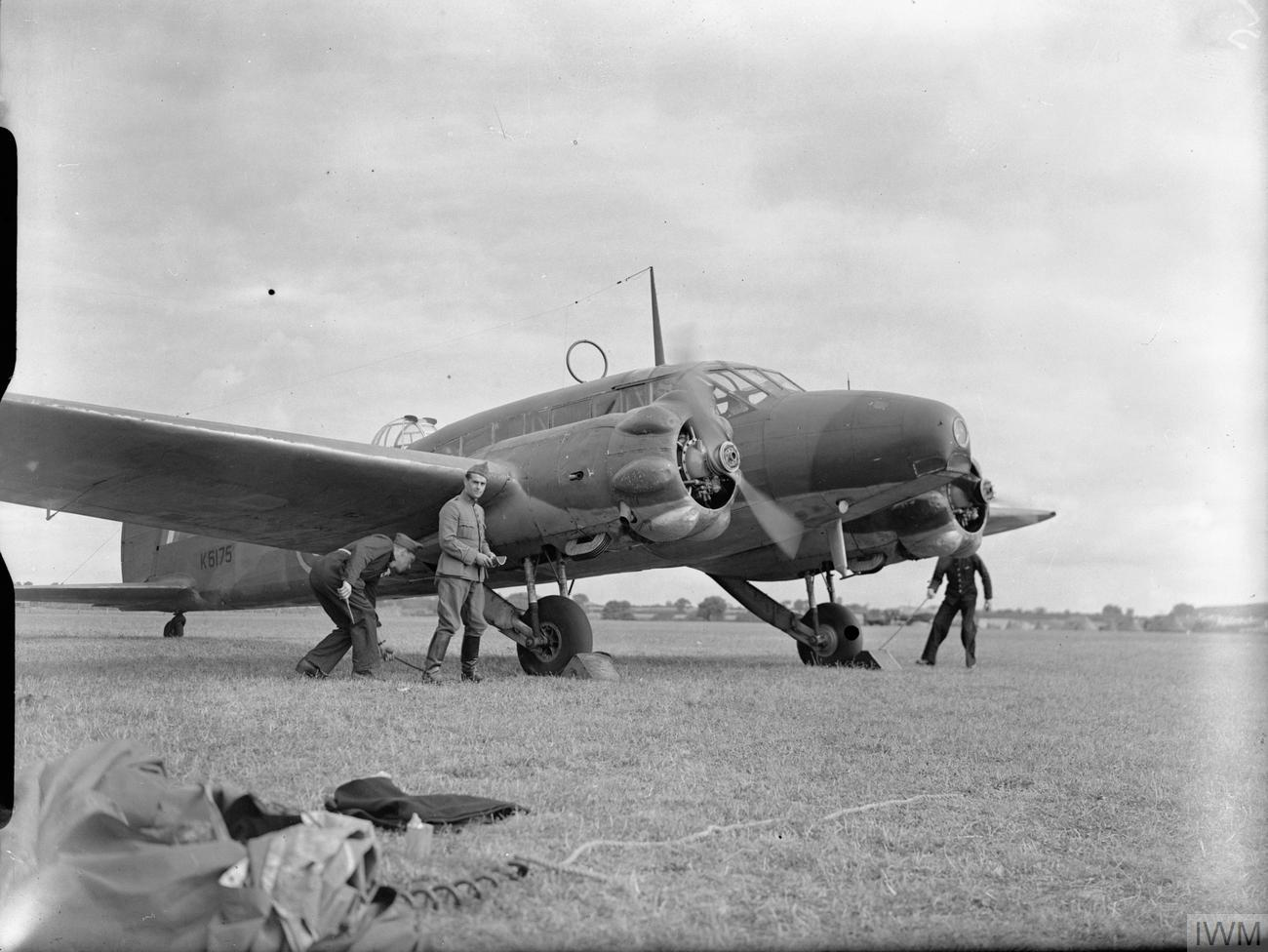
An Anson of No. 320 (Netherlands) Squadron, Coastal Command, about to take off on a patrol mission, circa 1940–1941

Even before the war began, it had become apparent that the Anson's limited performance made it unsuitable for its intended primary role as a maritime patrol aircraft. In 1938, it was decided to replace the type in this role with the American-built Lockheed Hudson, which was 100 mph faster, had three times the range, carried a much heavier bomb load, and possessed a superior defensive armament. The first squadron began converting to the Hudson in September 1939, but the remaining Coastal Command Anson squadrons entered the war with the aircraft already in service. With an endurance of only four hours, the Anson could operate only over the North Sea and other coastal waters, lacking the range to patrol the Norwegian coast. Its anti-submarine armament consisted of two 100 lb bombs, which, at least in theory, required a direct hit on a submarine's hull to be effective. On 3 December 1939, an Anson mistakenly attacked the surfaced Royal Navy submarine HMS Snapper. Although the aircraft struck the conning tower, the only damage was four broken light bulbs. In an earlier friendly fire incident off the coast of Scotland in September, bombs dropped by an Anson of No. 233 Squadron skipped off the water and detonated in an air burst, puncturing the aircraft's fuel tanks and forcing it to ditch off St Andrews. Despite numerous claims of attacks on U-boats during the opening months of the war, postwar examination of German records indicated that little damage had been inflicted.

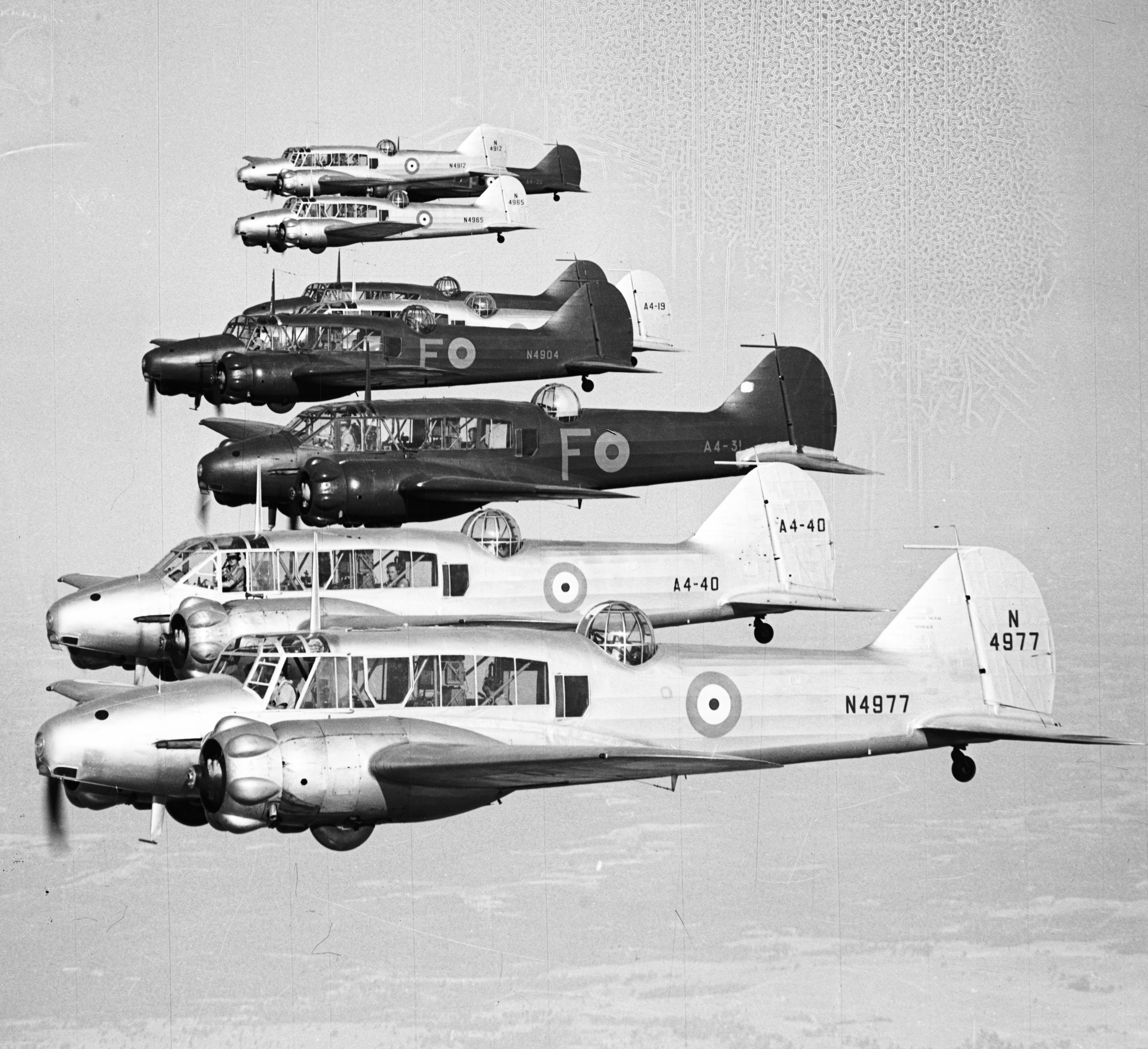
Avro Anson aircraft, Sydney, Australia, 19 March 1940

Despite its obsolescence, the Anson was employed during the Dunkirk evacuation to deter attacks by German E-boats on Allied shipping. On 1 June 1940, a flight of three Ansons was attacked near Dunkirk by nine Luftwaffe Messerschmitt Bf 109s. According to unsubstantiated claims, the Ansons destroyed two German aircraft and damaged a third without suffering any losses.

The Anson achieved greater success as a training aircraft for crews of multi-engined bombers such as the Avro Lancaster. It was first introduced to Flying Training Schools in November 1936, replacing obsolete bombers previously used for twin-engine instruction. The Anson was also used to train navigators, wireless operators, bomb aimers, and air gunners. After the war, it continued in training and light transport roles. The final RAF Ansons, serving with communications units, were withdrawn on 28 June 1968.

During the war, the British Air Transport Auxiliary used the Anson as its standard taxi aircraft, transporting groups of ferry pilots to and from aircraft collection points. No fatal mechanical failure occurred in an Anson operated by the ATA, and the type was generally held in high regard.

The Royal Australian Air Force (RAAF) ordered 33 Ansons in November 1935 for the maritime reconnaissance role. The first aircraft were delivered in 1936, and 48 were in service before the outbreak of war. The RAAF eventually operated 1,028 Ansons, the majority being Mk Is, which remained in service until 1955.

The Royal New Zealand Air Force (RNZAF) operated 23 Ansons as navigation trainers during the Second World War, alongside the more numerous Airspeed Oxford, and acquired additional aircraft for communications duties after the war. A preserved navigation trainer is displayed at the Air Force Museum of New Zealand at Wigram.

The Royal Indian Air Force operated several Ansons with No.1 Service Flying Training School (India) for pilot and navigation training. The aircraft continued in this role after Indian independence before being retired on an unknown date.

The Royal Canadian Air Force (RCAF) and Royal Canadian Navy (RCN) operated 4,413 Ansons, comprising 1,962 built in Britain and 2,451 built in Canada. The RCN continued operating the type until 1952. Although most Canadian-built Ansons served with the training schools of the British Commonwealth Air Training Plan, some were employed operationally by the RCAF's Eastern Air Command. The role of training schools in combat operations during the Battle of the St. Lawrence was described by Hugh A. Halliday in the Royal Canadian Legion magazine on 1 March 2006:

The need for Atlantic patrols was undiminished, yet the Battle of the St. Lawrence stretched EAC resources. Based at Charlottetown, 31 General Reconnaissance School was mobilized to fly patrols using Avro Ansons, each carrying two 250-pound bombs. At the very outset of the war, the Anson and its ordnance had failed in RAF anti-submarine work. Now in Canada, it was remobilized as an aerial scarecrow. German views varied as to Canadian countermeasures. The captain of U-517 found his operations increasingly restricted by strengthened air patrols. In October 1942, U-69 reported "strong sea patrol and constant patrol by aircraft with radar."

The United States Army Air Forces (USAAF) operated 50 Canadian-built Ansons, designated AT-20.

The Egyptian Air Force (EAF) operated a number of Ansons for communications and VIP transport duties. A specially equipped Anson was presented to the King of Egypt by the RAF. The Royal Afghan Air Force acquired 13 Anson 18s in 1948 for a variety of roles, and these aircraft remained in service until 1972.

=== Postwar civil use ===
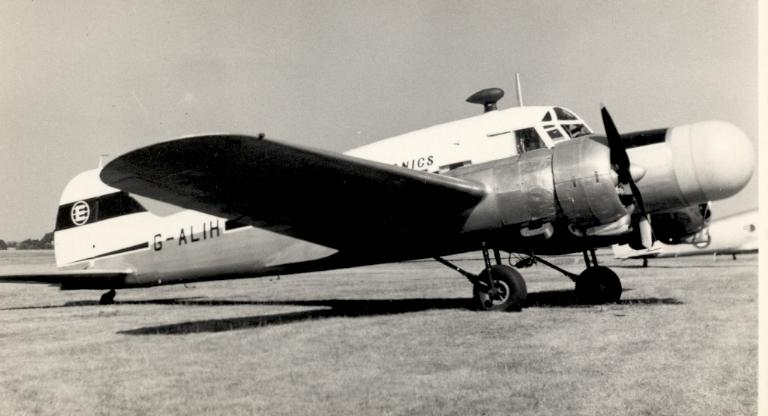
Anson 11 G-ALIH of Ekco Electronics at Blackbushe, Hants, in September 1955

After the war, Ansons continued in production with Avro at Woodford. At this time, large amounts of the type were being converted for civilian use, where they were operated as light transports by a range of small charter airlines and as executive aircraft by large corporations. Countries that saw civilian operations with Ansons included the United Kingdom, Canada (Mk. V aircraft only), Australia and Mexico.

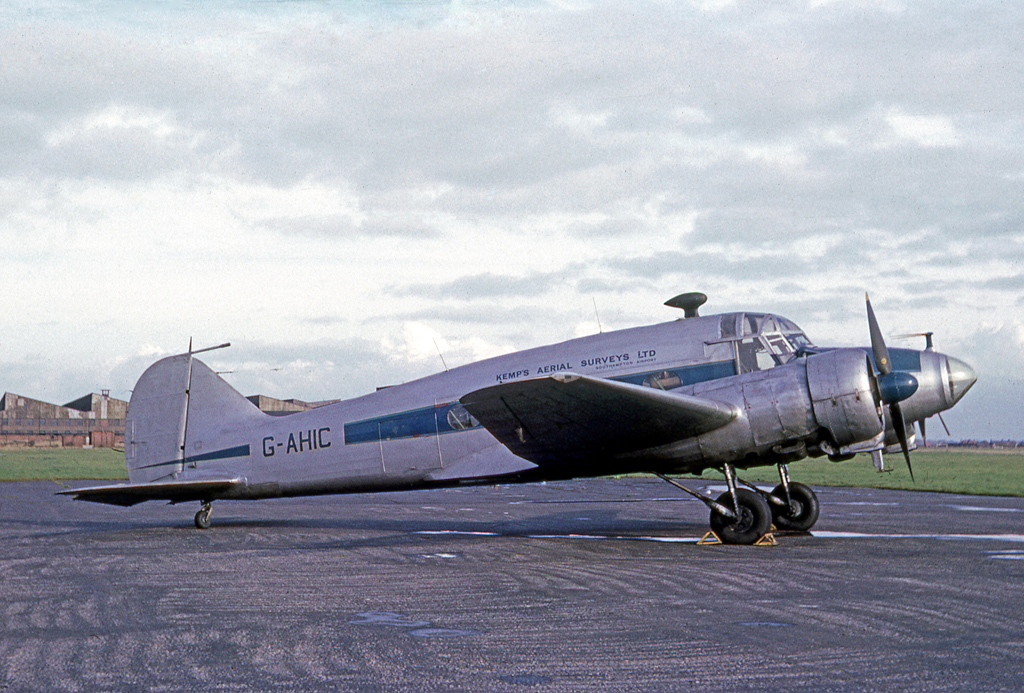
An Anson XIX, which had been operated for aerial survey work in the United Kingdom up to 1973

Railway Air Services operated Ansons on scheduled services from London's Croydon Airport via Manchester to Belfast (Nutts Corner) in 1946 and 1947. Sivewright Airways operated three Mk XIX aircraft from their Manchester Airport base on local charter flights, flights to Jersey, and Ronaldsway Airport in the Isle of Man until 1951. Finglands Airways operated an ex-RAF Anson I on inclusive tour flights and on scheduled flights from Manchester Airport to Newquay Airport between 1949 and 1952. Kemps Aerial Surveys operated several Anson XIXs on survey work within the UK until their retirement in 1973.

In 1948, India ordered 12 new Anson 18Cs for use by the Directorate of Civil Aviation as trainers and communications aircraft; these were delivered from Yeadon in the spring of 1949.

Ansons continued to be manufactured by Avro at Woodford for the RAF until March 1952; the type was used as trainers and served in the role of Station communications aircraft until 1968.

The wooden wings of Ansons flying in Australia were found to fail at a high rate. The phenolic glue bonds would part, and it was speculated that the problem was due to the high humidity. In 1962, the Commonwealth Government decided to ground the majority of wooden-winged aircraft then in operation; amongst those aircraft affected, the Anson and De Havilland Mosquito were included. Of the Ansons, no such aircraft were re-registered as the government had mandated a test that essentially destroyed the wings, thus requiring the fitting of new wings. Most owners decided to voluntarily scrap their aircraft well before this time.

During the late 20th century, the vast majority of Ansons were retired, with three aircraft still appearing at flying displays, two in the UK, one in New Zealand. A fourth aircraft in Canada was being restored to airworthiness in 2016.

== Accidents and incidents ==
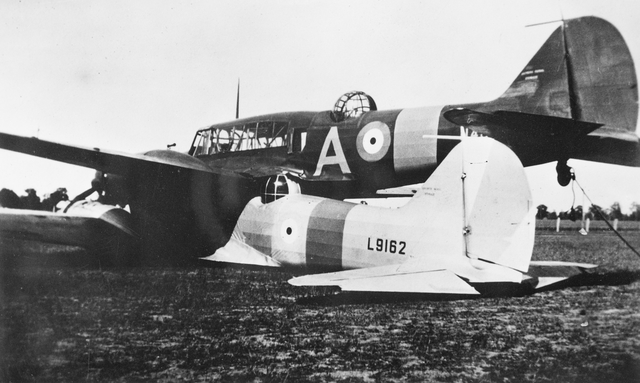
The two Ansons involved in the Brocklesby mid-air collision of 1940 lying interlocked in a paddock

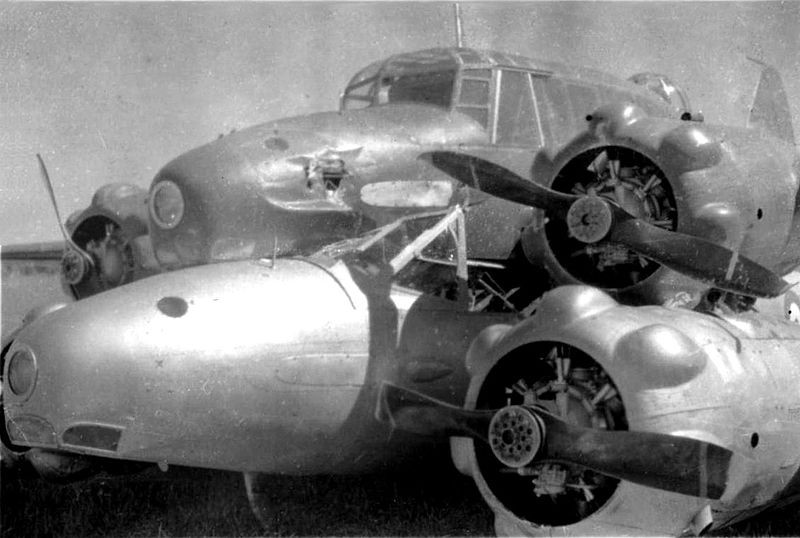
Engines and forward sections of the two Ansons

- On 11 September 1937, Anson K8778 of No. 233 Squadron RAF crashed in poor visibility on the Gisborough Moor escarpment, above Guisborough in the North Riding of Yorkshire, while returning from an exercise with the Royal Navy; all four crew were killed.
- On 10 August 1938, RAAF Anson A4-29 came out of dense cloud and crashed into Arthurs Seat, Victoria killing four crew members. There was one survivor.
- On 28 April 1939, Anson A4-32 of No. 6 Squadron RAAF crashed near Riverstone, New South Wales on the return leg of an air navigation course, killing all four crew members.
- On 18 December 1939, Anson N4887 of 1 Flying Training School crashed on the Richmond Golf Course shortly after take-off from the Richmond RAAF Base, killing all five crew members.
- On 29 September 1940, Ansons L9162 and N4876 of No. 2 Service Flying Training School RAAF collided in mid-air and became locked together in flight. A successful emergency landing was made at Brocklesby, New South Wales. L9162 became a ground instructional airframe, whilst N4876 was repaired and returned to service (see 1940 Brocklesby mid-air collision).
- On 8 November 1940, Anson N9945 piloted by RAF Pilot Officer Frederick Phillip Fry struck a barrage balloon cable near Birmingham and crashed killing all five on board.
- On 28 January 1941, RAAF Anson A4-5 left Parkes bound for Mascot on a medical evacuation flight. It approached Glenbrook and suffered a structural failure of the port wing crashing near the corner of Cliffton Ave and Lucasville Road killing all five on board.
- On 13 April 1941, Anson N9857 of 19 Operational Training Unit from RAF Kinloss crashed on Beinn an Fhurain at an altitude of 2,300 feet (701 m) approximately 3 miles (5 km) east of Inchnadamph. At least 4 of the 6 aircrew survived the crash but died of exposure in blizzard conditions. Their bodies are buried at the crash site.
- On 17 April 1942, Anson W2630 of RAF Wigtown crashed into the east side of Galloway mountain Cairnsmore of Fleet near Creetown, southwest Scotland. The aircraft exploded on impact, killing the pilot and a civilian passenger. The wireless operator survived with severe burns.
- On 2 July 1942, Anson Mk.I N5297 of No.2 Observers Advanced Flying Unit (O)AFU crashed on Shalloch-on-Minnoch, South Ayrshire, during a navigation training flight out of Millom, Cumbria. All five airmen, including three trainees, were killed.
- On 9 October 1942, four Royal Australian Air Force (RAAF) airmen were killed when their Anson crashed near Clackline, Western Australia. The crew are commemorated by the Avro Anson Memorial.
- On 30 October 1942, an Anson took off from Sidney airport on Vancouver Island, British Columbia, Canada, with Royal Canadian Air Force Sgt. William Baird and British Air Force Pilot Officer Charles Fox, Pilot Officer Anthony Lawrence and Sgt. Robert Luckock aboard. The aircraft crashed, killing all aboard, 50 kilometres (30 mi) from takeoff, on a remote mountainside near Port Renfrew. The wreckage and remains of the crew were found by loggers in October 2013 and recovered in May 2014.
- On 2 November 1942, Anson DG919 of 67 Squadron RAAF (attached to RAAF Base Laverton) crashed at Mallacoota Airfield in Victoria, Australia, killing crew members Sergeant John Hueston Sawrey, Sergeant Leonard Arthur Lupton and Sergeant Ralph Cassidy. The aircraft overran the runway, crashed into a quarry and the three 100 lb bombs on board exploded.
- On 28 November 1942, Anson I N9838 of 38 Air Navigation School (Canada) RAF operating from RCAF Port Albert was lost over Lake Huron during a routine night-time training mission. The aircraft's last position was recorded approximately 15 minutes flying time from the airfield, after which contact was lost. The bodies of pilot, Sergeant Leslie Shaw, Flight Sergeant Robert Brown (of the Free French Airforce - also known as Robert Basquin), Leading Aircraftman Cecil James and Aircraftman First Class William Addis were never recovered. No official cause for the crash was identified but it was speculated that wing icing may have contributed.
- On 7 December 1943, another piggy-back accident occurred when RCAF #18 SFTS Anson II JS193 came down on top of Anson II JS167 in the landing circuit at Gimli, Manitoba. Both aircraft landed safely still entangled, and both were later repaired.
- On 19 January 1944, RCAF #2 Training Command, Anson II #7164 landed on top of Anson II #8561 and again both landed safely but entangled. Anson #7164 was a write-off, but #8561 was repaired.
- On 13 February 1944, a USAAF 29(PR) Squadron AT-20 (Anson II) 43-8197 crashed on takeoff at Will Rogers Field, Oklahoma City, Oklahoma, 2Lt S.F. Jankowski killed, pilot V.N. Luber injured. The pilots had forgotten to remove the gust locks from the controls. This was the only fatal accident involving a USAAF AT-20.
- On 19 December 1945, a Companhia Meridional de Transportes Anson Mk. II registration PP-MTA crashed in the neighbourhood of Itaipu, Niterói, Brazil killing all passengers and crew, including the pilot and owner of the airline, Álvaro Araújo.
- On 14 December 1947, a Mark 1 AX505, ex VH-BBY, recently purchased by the Indonesian government and numbered RI-003, was being used to transport war equipment and medicine. It crashed in the sea between Malaya and Sumatra. The two crew were killed and were later appointed Indonesian National Heroes. There is a memorial to them with a sculpture of the aircraft.
- On 11 June 1948, Avro XIX G-AGNI of Lancashire Aircraft Corporation ditched off Bradda Head, Isle of Man due to fuel exhaustion. The aircraft was operating a scheduled passenger flight from Squires Gate Airport, Blackpool to Ronaldsway Airport, Isle of Man via RAF Walney Island, Lancashire. All nine people on board were rescued by a trawler from Port Erin and the MV Silkthorn.

== Variants ==
The main Anson variant was the Mk I, of which 6,704 were built in Britain. The other variants were mainly distinguished by their powerplant with Canadian-built Ansons using local engines. To overcome steel shortages, the 1,051 Canadian-built Mk V Ansons featured a plywood fuselage.

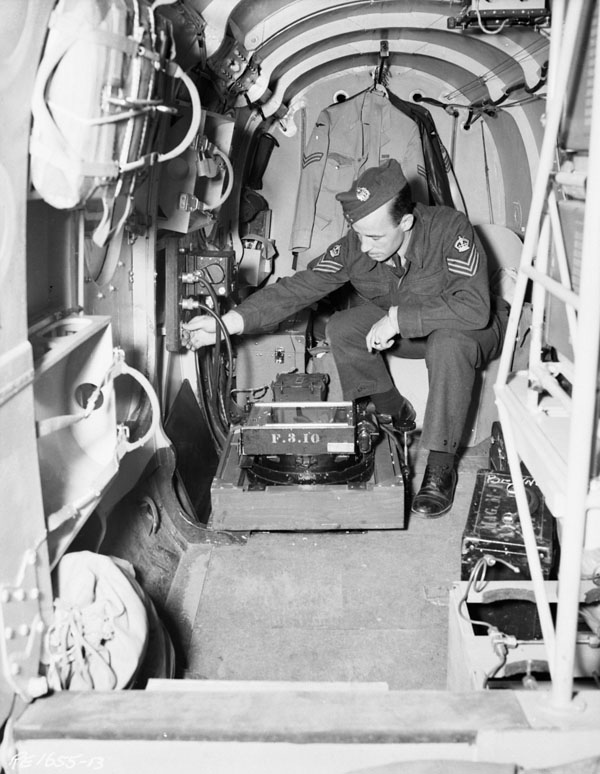
Installing a vertical camera in an Avro Anson V of No. 14 (P) Squadron, RCAF, Rockcliffe, Ontario, 4 July 1944

Mk I
6,688 Mk Is were built. Powered by two 350 hp (260 kW) Armstrong Siddeley Cheetah IX or 395 hp (295 kW) XIX engines.
Mk II
1,401 Mk IIs were built in Canada; powered by two 330 hp (250 kW) Jacobs L-6MB R-915 engines and fitted with hydraulic landing gear retraction rather than the manual system used on the Anson I.
Mk III
432 Mk I aircraft converted in Canada to two 330 hp (250 kW) Jacobs L-6MB R-915 engines.
Mk IV
One aircraft converted from a Mk I in Canada to two Wright R-975 Whirlwind engines.
Mk V
1,069 Mk Vs were built in Canada for navigator training powered by two 450 hp (340 kW) Pratt & Whitney R-985 Wasp Junior engines and given a new wood monocoque fuselage. 77 early Mk. V aircraft built using Mk. II components were designated Mk. VA.
Mk VI
One aircraft was built in Canada for bombing and gunnery training; it was powered by two 450 hp (340 kW) R-985 Wasp Junior engines.
Mk X
104 Anson Mk Is were converted into Mk Xs with a reinforced floor, for use as a transport.
Mk XI
90 Anson Mk Is were converted into Mk XIs.
Mk XII
20 Anson Mk Is were converted into Mk XIIs, plus 221 new Mk XII aircraft built.
Mk XIII
Gunnery trainer powered by two Cheetah XI or XIX engines; never built.
Mk XIV
Gunnery trainer powered by two Cheetah XV engines; never built.
Mk XVI
Navigation trainer; never built.
Mk XV
Bombing trainer; never built.
C 19
264 were built for the RAF; used as communications and transport aircraft.
T 20
Navigation trainer for the RAF, a variant of the Mk XIX to meet Air Ministry Specification T.24/46 for an overseas navigation trainer, one pilot two wireless operators (one trainee and one instructor) and five navigator positions (three trainees and two instructors). Used for bombing and navigation training in Southern Rhodesia, 60 built.
T 21
Navigation trainers for the RAF, a variant of the Mk XIX to meet Air Ministry Specification T.25/46 for a home navigation trainer, one pilot two wireless operators (one trainee and one instructor) and five navigator positions (three trainees and two instructors). A prototype was flown in May 1948, 252 were built.
C.21
Modification of T.21s for communications and transport duties.
T 22
Radio trainers for the RAF, a variant of the Mk XIX to meet Air Ministry Specification T.26/46, one pilot and four wireless operator stations (three for trainees and one for an instructor), a prototype was flown in June 1948, 54 built.
Anson 18
Developed from the Avro Nineteen; 12 aircraft were sold to the Royal Afghan Air Force for use as communications, police patrol and aerial survey aircraft.
Anson 18C
13 aircraft were built for the Indian government; used for training civil aircrews.
Avro Nineteen
(Also known as the Anson XIX): Civil transport version; 56 aircraft were built in two series.
AT-20
United States military designation for Canadian-built Anson IIs used by the United States Army Air Forces, 50 built.

== Operators ==
The Avro Anson was used by both military and civilian operators from 1935 until the early 1970s. The main users were the Royal Air Force (5000+), Royal Canadian Air Force (4,413) and Royal Australian Air Force (936)

- Afghanistan
- Argentina
- Australia
- Bahrain
- Belgium
- Brazil
- Canada
- Cuba
- Czechoslovakia
- Egypt
- Estonia
- Ethiopia
- Finland
- France
- Greece
- India
- India
- Indonesia
- Iran
- Iraq
- Ireland
- Israel
- Mexico
- Netherlands
- New Zealand
- Norway
- Paraguay
- Portugal
- Portuguese Timor
- Rhodesia
- Saudi Arabia
- South Africa
- Southern Rhodesia
- Syria
- Turkey
- United Kingdom
- United States
- Yugoslavia

== Surviving aircraft ==
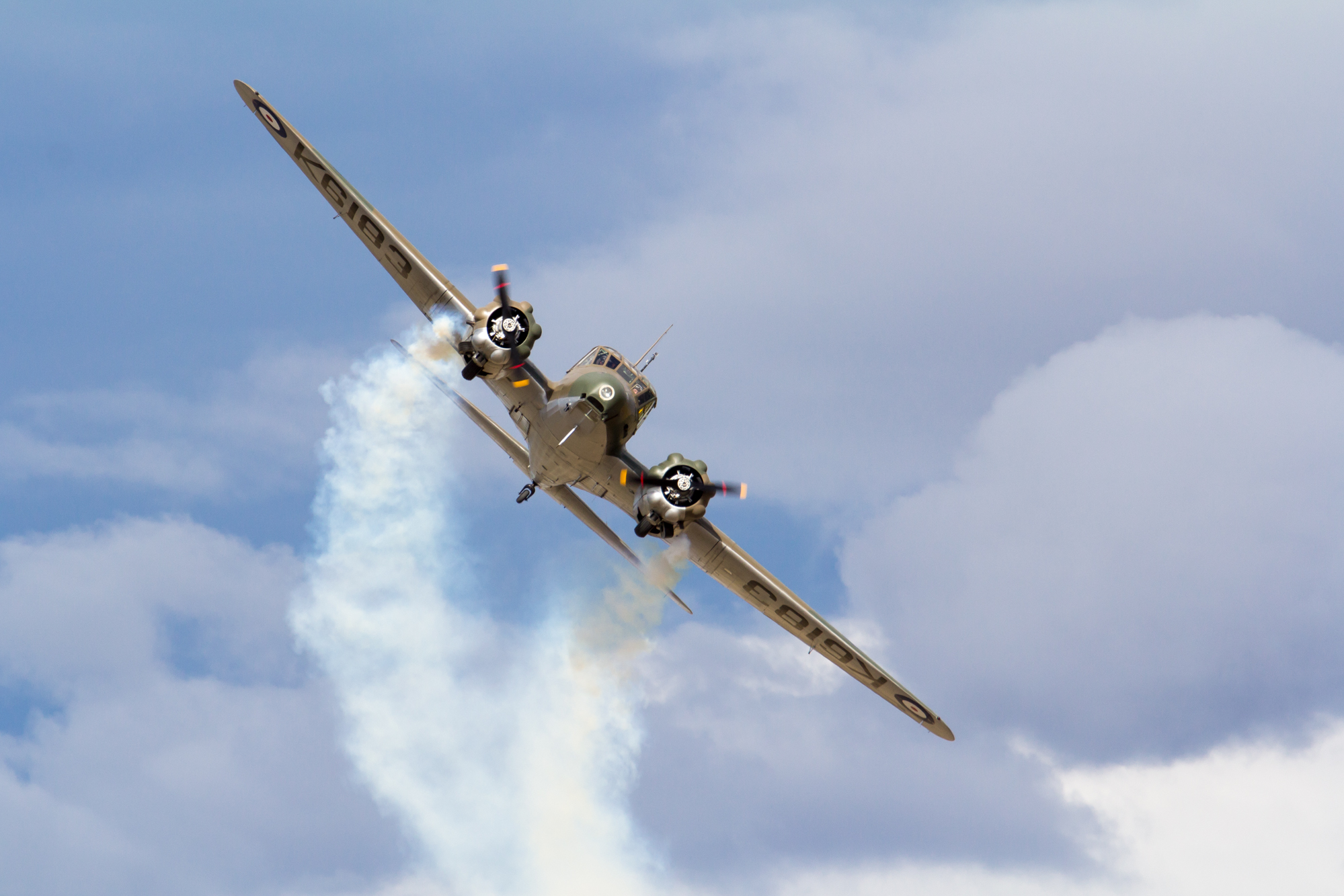
Anson ZK-RRA performing a public display at Classic Fighters 2015

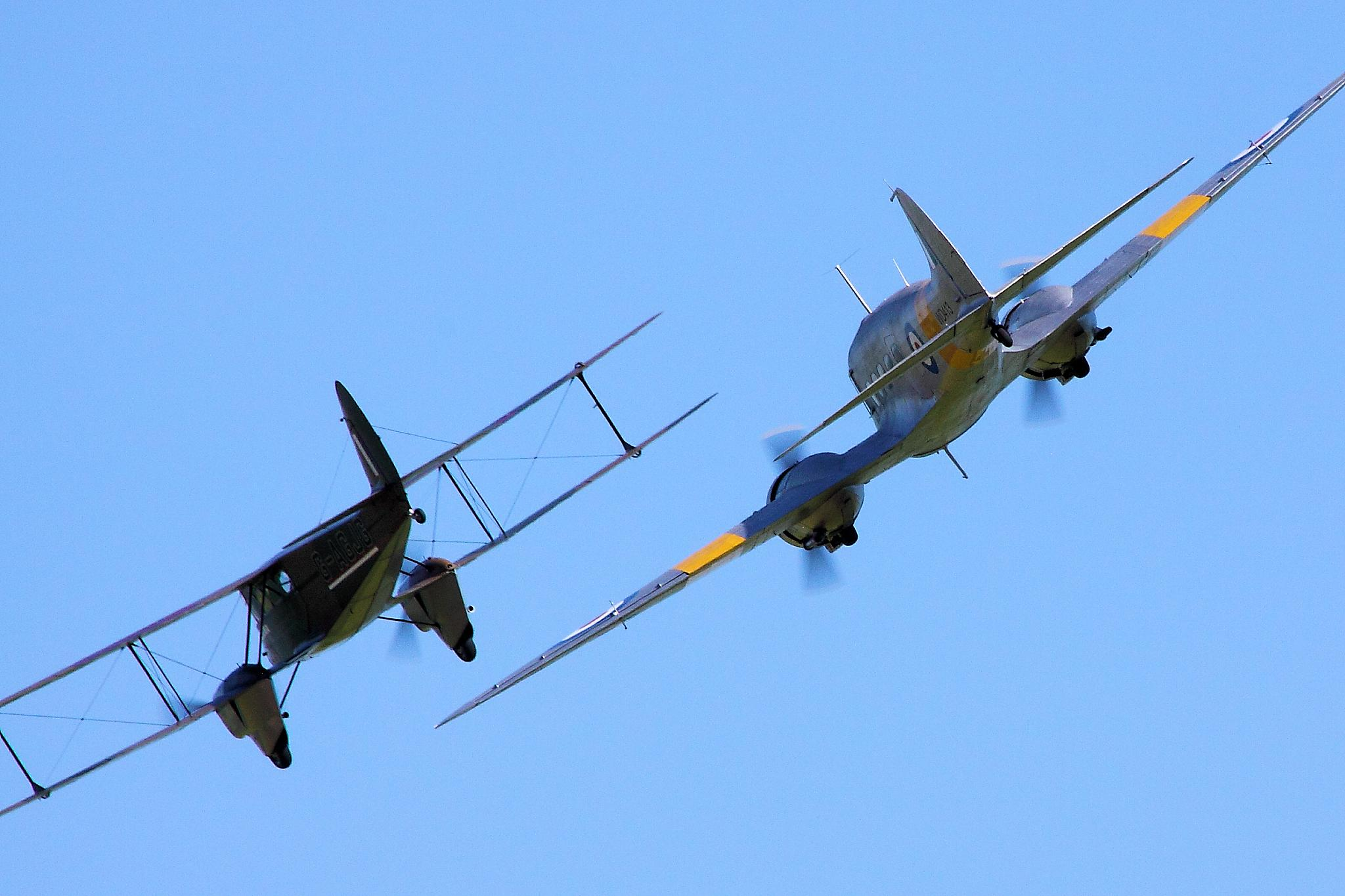
An Avro Anson flying in close formation with a de Havilland Dragon Rapide at the Duxford Jubilee Airshow 2012

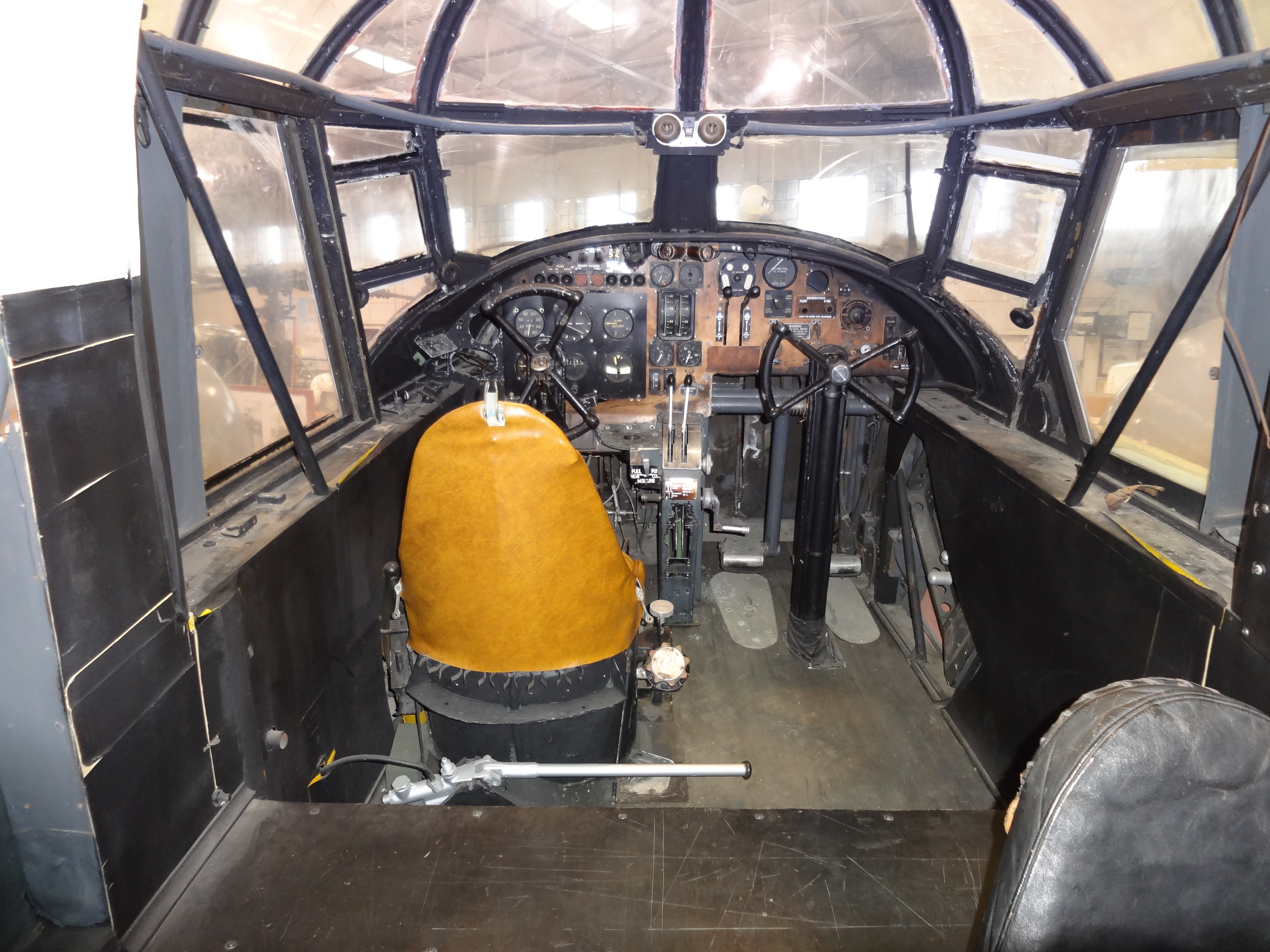
The cockpit of Avro C.19 141, displayed at the Irish Air Corps Museum, 2014

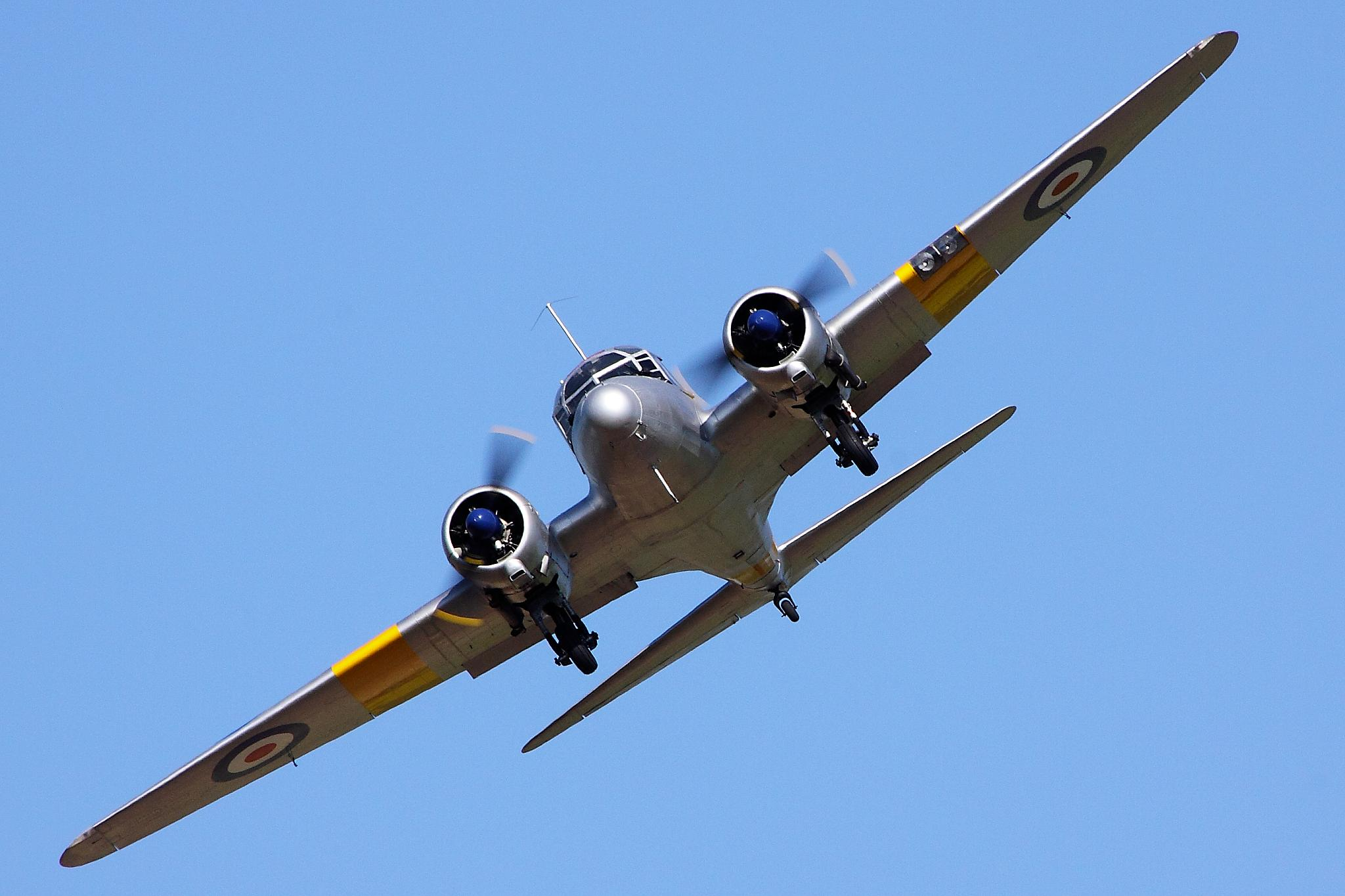
A preserved Avro Anson in flight, 2012

=== Australia ===
On display

- W2068 - Anson 1 VH-ASM. On public display in glass walled building at Tamworth Airport Tamworth NSW Australia. Operated post WW2 by East West Airlines (their first aircraft) then Marshall Airways.
- W2121 – Anson I on static display at the Aviation Heritage Museum at Bull Creek, Western Australia.
- W2364 – Anson I displayed at the Nhill Aviation Heritage Centre in Nhill, Victoria.
- AX350 – Anson I on static display at the Lincoln Nitschke Aviation Collection at Greenock, South Australia.

Stored or under restoration

- R9883 – Anson I stored at the Camden Museum of Aviation, New South Wales - closed to the general public since 2008.
- W2472 – Anson I under restoration at the RAAF Amberley Aviation Heritage Centre in Amberley, Queensland.
- EF954 – Anson I under restoration at the South Australian Aviation Museum in Port Adelaide, South Australia. The restoration uses parts from AW965.
- LV284 – Anson I under restoration at the Avro Anson Museum in Ballarat, Victoria.
- MG222 – Anson I under restoration at the Queensland Air Museum in Caloundra, Queensland.
- MG422 – Anson I (remains only) on display at the Evans Head Heritage Aviation Museum, New South Wales.

=== Canada ===
On display

- Unknown – Anson II on static display at the Alberta Aviation Museum in Edmonton, Alberta.
- Unknown – Anson II on static display at the Greenwood Military Aviation Museum in Greenwood, Nova Scotia.
- 7481 – Anson II on static display at the Bomber Command Museum of Canada in Nanton, Alberta.
- 12125 – Anson V on static display at the Commonwealth Air Training Plan Museum in Brandon, Manitoba.
- 12518 – Anson V on static display at the Canada Aviation and Space Museum in Ottawa, Ontario.
- Composite – Anson II at The Hangar Flight Museum in Calgary, Alberta. It painted as RCAF 7401.
- Composite – Anson II on static display at the British Columbia Aviation Museum in Sidney, British Columbia. This airframe is K8786, restored using parts of FP846, as which it is painted.
- R9725 – Anson I on static display at the Saskatchewan Western Development Museum in Moose Jaw, Saskatchewan.
- Unknown – Anson II on static display at the National Air Force Museum of Canada in Trenton, Ontario

Stored or under restoration

- 6081 - Anson Mk.I under restoration to static display at Saskatchewan aviation museum in Saskatoon, Saskatchewan.
- 12417 – Anson V under restoration to airworthy condition at the Canadian Warplane Heritage Museum in Hamilton, Ontario.
- 12477 – Anson V stored at the Reynolds-Alberta Museum in Wetaskiwin, Alberta.

=== Czech Republic ===
Airworthy

- OO-ANS (formerly RAF/RAAF MH120) now painted to represent RAF Coastal Command K6183 – Anson I airworthy with R.A.F. Station Czechoslovakia at Podhořany u Ronova, Czech Republic.

=== Ireland ===
On display

- 141 – Avro C.19 on static display at the Irish Air Corps Museum in Baldonnel, County Dublin.

=== Netherlands ===
On display

- VM352 – Anson 19 on static display at the Canadian Allied Forces Museum Foundation in Groningen.

=== New Zealand ===
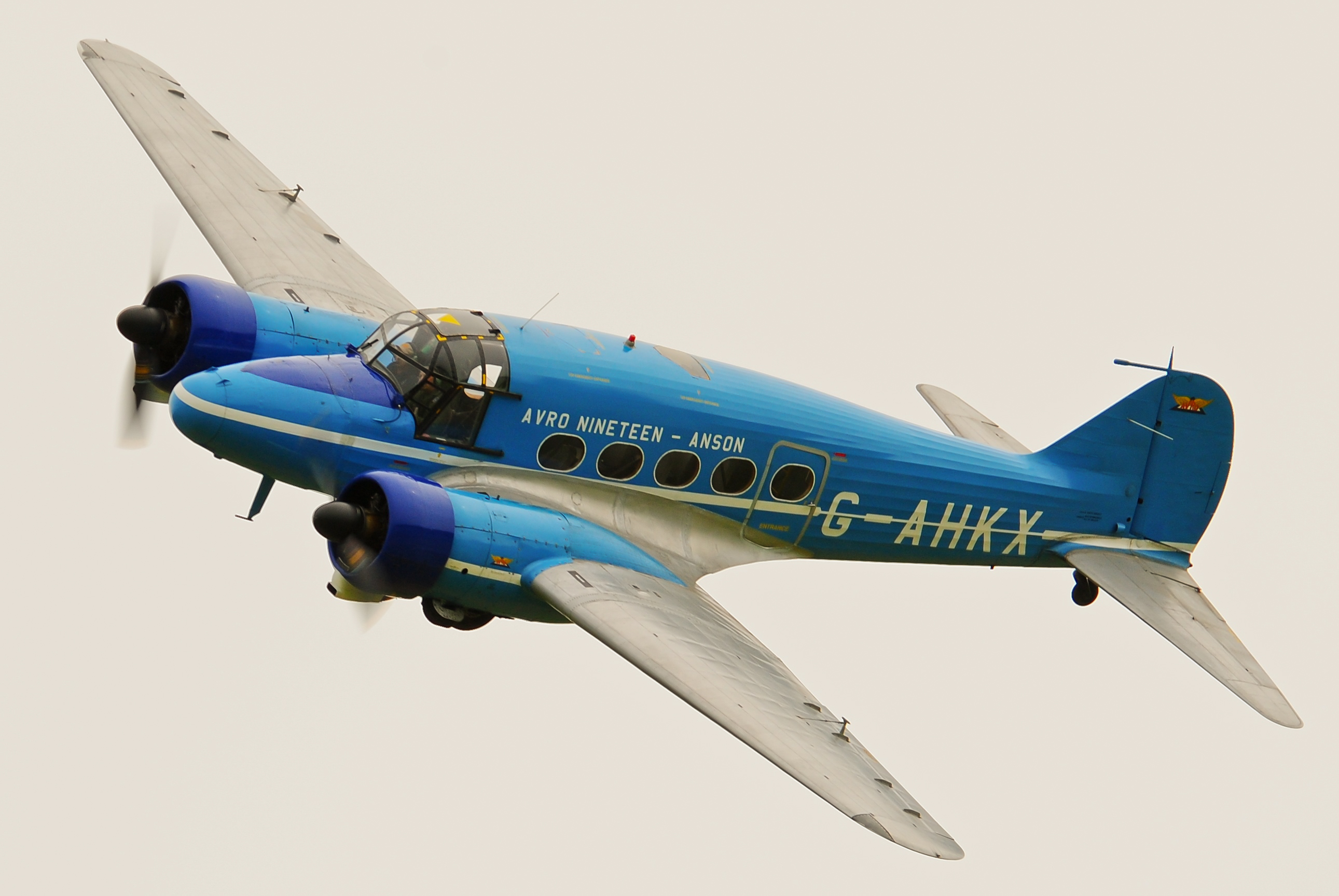
Avro 19 (Anson) of the BAe Systems Heritage Flight based at The Shuttleworth Collection at Old Warden in 2013

On display

- Composite – Anson I on static display at the Air Force Museum of New Zealand in Wigram, Canterbury. This airframe is a composite of several aircraft including the fuselage of NZ415, centre section, mainplane, and tailplane of VL352, and various other parts from NZ410 and NZ422.

=== United Arab Emirates ===
On display

- TX183 – Anson 19 on display at Al Mahatta Museum in Sharjah.

=== United Kingdom ===
Airworthy

- G-AHKX – Anson XIX airworthy with the Shuttleworth Collection at Old Warden Aerodrome, Bedfordshire. Formerly operated by the collection on behalf of the BAe Systems Heritage Flight, the aircraft was donated to the collection in 2022.
- WD413 – Anson C.21, now privately owned and registered as G-VROE. It was previously operated by Classic Air Force at Coventry Airport.

On display

- N4877 – Anson I on static display at the Imperial War Museum Duxford in Duxford, Cambridgeshire.
- LT773 VH-AZU – Anson I fuselage on static display at the Royal Air Force Museum London in London.
- TX213 – Anson C.19 on static display at the North East Land, Sea and Air Museums in Sunderland, Tyne and Wear.
- TX214 – Anson C.19 on static display at the Royal Air Force Museum Cosford in Cosford, Shropshire.
- TX266 – Anson C.19 on static display whilst under restoration at Montrose Air Station Museum.
- VL348 – Anson C.19 on static display at the Newark Air Museum in Newark, Nottinghamshire.
- VL349 – Anson C.19 on static display at the Norfolk and Suffolk Aviation Museum in Flixton, Suffolk.
- VM360 – Anson C.19 on static display at the National Museum of Flight in East Fortune, East Lothian.

Stored or under restoration

- AX246 – Anson I under restoration with Jet Art Aviation near Leeds, Yorkshire.
- TX235 – Anson C.19 under restoration with the Classic Air Force near Coventry, West Midlands.
- VM325 – Anson C.19 under restoration with the Carew Control Tower Group in Carew, Pembrokeshire.
- VV901 – Anson T.21 under restoration to static display at the Yorkshire Air Museum in Elvington, North Yorkshire.

== Specifications (GR Mk I) ==
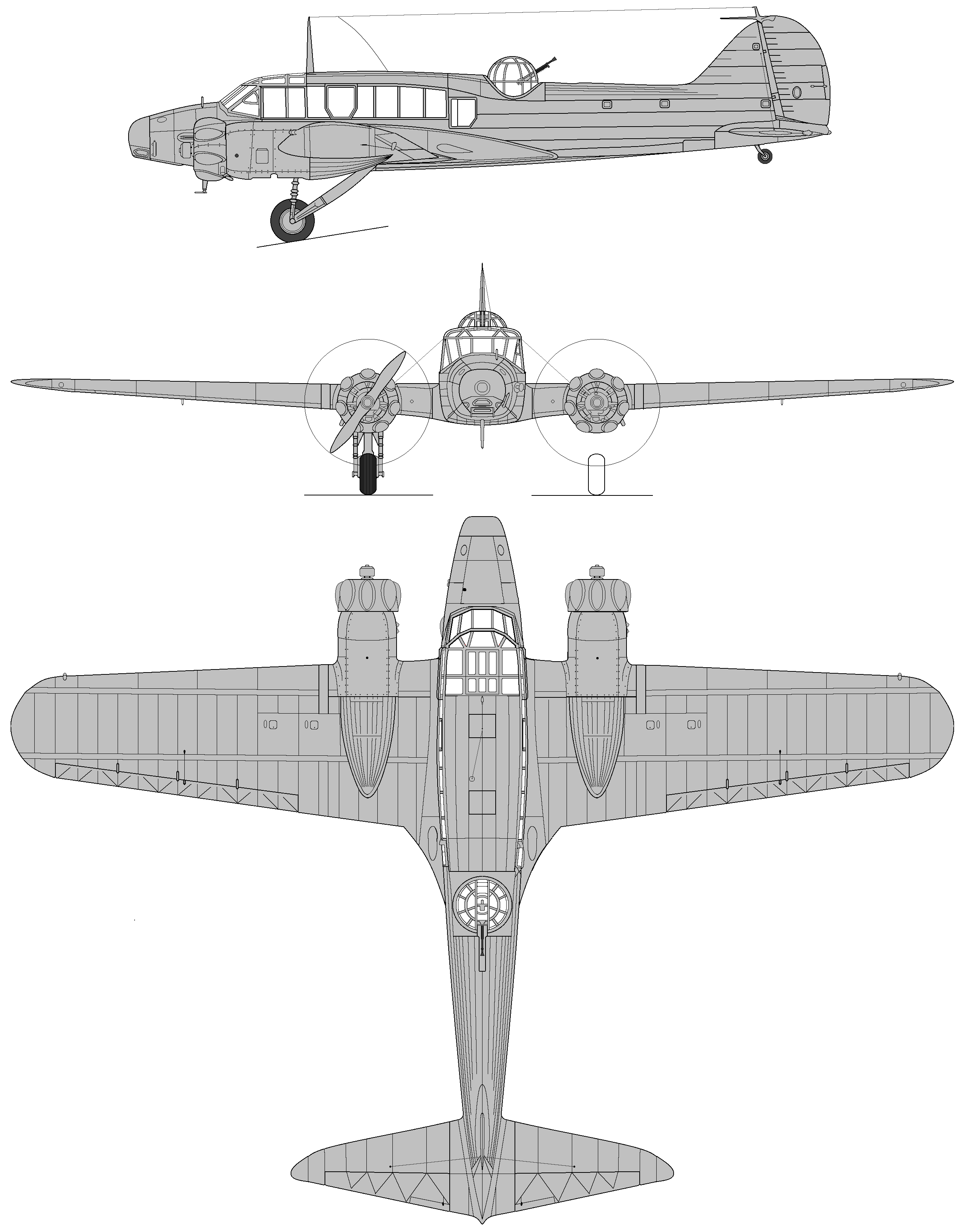
3-view drawing of the Avro Anson I

Data from The Hamlyn Concise Guide to British Aircraft of World War II, and Avro Aircraft since 1908

General characteristics

- Crew: 3–4
- Length: 42 ft 3 in (12.88 m)
- Wingspan: 56 ft 6 in (17.22 m)
- Height: 13 ft 1 in (3.99 m)
- Wing area: 463 sq ft (43.0 m^{2})
- Empty weight: 5,375 lb (2,438 kg)
- Max takeoff weight: 8,000 lb (3,629 kg)
- Powerplant: 2 × Armstrong Siddeley Cheetah IX 7-cylinder air-cooled radial piston engines, 335 hp (250 kW) each
- Propellers: 2-bladed fixed-pitch propellers

Performance

- Maximum speed: 188 mph (303 km/h, 163 kn) at 7,000 ft (2,100 m)
- Cruise speed: 158 mph (254 km/h, 137 kn)
- Range: 660 mi (1,060 km, 570 nmi)
- Service ceiling: 19,000 ft (5,800 m)
- Rate of climb: 960 ft/min (4.9 m/s)

Armament

- Guns:

- 1 × .303 in (7.7 mm) machine gun in front fuselage
- 1 × .303 in (7.7 mm) Vickers K machine gun in dorsal turret

- Bombs:

- 360 lb (160 kg) of bombs

== Notable aircraft ==
- Avro Anson RI-003

== See also ==
Related development

- Avro 652

Aircraft of comparable role, configuration, and era

- Airspeed Oxford
- Cessna AT-17 Bobcat
- Focke-Wulf Fw 58
- Kyūshū Q1W Tokai
- Siebel Si 204
- Tachikawa Ki-54

Related lists

- List of aircraft of World War II
- List of aircraft of the Fleet Air Arm
- List of aircraft of the Royal Air Force
