= Iswahyudi =

Indonesian air commodore (1918–1947)

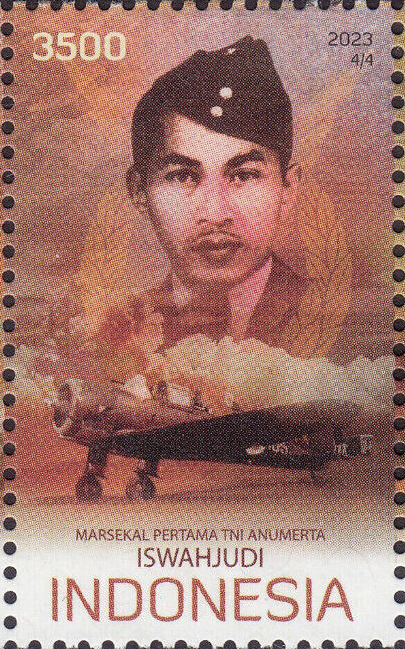
- Iswahyudi on a 2023 stamp of Indonesia
- Born: 15 July 1918; Soerabaia, Dutch East Indies
- Burial place: Kalibata Heroes' Cemetery (symbolic)
- Military career
- Allegiance: Dutch East Indies (1941–1945); Indonesia (1945–1947)
- Service years: 1941–1947
- Rank: Air Commodore
- Awards: National Hero of Indonesia
- Disappeared: 14 December 1947 (aged 29); Off the coast of Tanjung Hantu Hill, Perak, Malayan Union
- Status: Retrospectively declared dead in absentia 14 December 1947 (aged 29)

Air Commodore Iswahyudi (born 15 July 1918; disappeared 14 December 1947) was an Indonesian airman and National Hero. On 14 December 1947, the plane he was flying with Halim Perdanakusuma crashed off the coast of Tanjung Hantu Hill, Perak, Malayan Union. Halim's body was later found, but Iswahyudi's was never recovered.

== Biography ==
Iswahyudi was born on 15 July 1918 in Surabaya, East Java. He studied at a HIS (Hollandsche Inlandshe School, or elementary school for native Indonesians) and MULO (Meer Uitgebreid Lager Onderwijs, or junior high school) in Surabaya. He continued his studies to an AMS (senior high school) in Malang.

Iswahyudi then enrolled at a medical school in Surabaya. While studying at the school, he became interested in aviation. As a result, he quit his studies and enrolled at the Military Officers' School (Militaire Luchtuaart Opleiding School) in Kalijati, West Java in 1941. He received the Klein Militair Brevet (Junior Military Pilot Licence) upon graduation.

During the Japanese occupation, the best graduates of the military academy were evacuated to Europe and Australia by the Dutch to undergo further education and missions. However, Iswahyudi, who was evacuated to Australia, felt dissatisfied and returned to Dutch East Indies by rubber boat. After the Proclamation of Independence in 1945, Iswahyudi helped the people of Surabaya to defend the city. He secured airplanes and Japanese weapons, which had been taken to Tanjung Perak. Afterward, Iswahyudi joined Tentara Keamanan Rakyat Jawatan Penerbangan (Flight Service of People's Security Forces; modern day Indonesian Air Force) in Yogyakarta.

Instructed by Adisucipto from 1 January 1946, Iswahyudi and Iman Suwongso Wiryosaputro were able to fly solo within three weeks. On 7 February 1946, Iswahyudi and Iman were appointed as instructors. On 23 April 1946, he was chosen as one of three pilots who escorted two senior officers, Air Commodore Suryadi Suryadarma and Major General Sudibyo, to a negotiation with the Allies about the return of prisoners of war.

In December 1947, Iswahyudi and Air Commodore Halim Perdanakusuma flew to Bangkok in an Avro Anson to make a deal Singaporean arms dealers and build a relationship with Singaporean and Thai government officials. On 14 December 1947, on the flight back to Indonesia, the plane – piloted by Iswahyudi – suffered a structural failure and crashed off Tanjung Hantu, Malaysia. Halim's body was later found, but Iswahyudi's was never recovered.

== Legacy ==
In order to commemorate his work, Iswahyudi was posthumously promoted to Air Commodore. In 1975, he was awarded the title National Hero of Indonesia through Presidential Decree number 063/TK/1975, officially declaring him dead as it is a posthumous title. His name is also used for Iswahyudi Air Force Base in Madiun.

== See also ==
- List of people who disappeared
