= Avro Anson RI-003 =

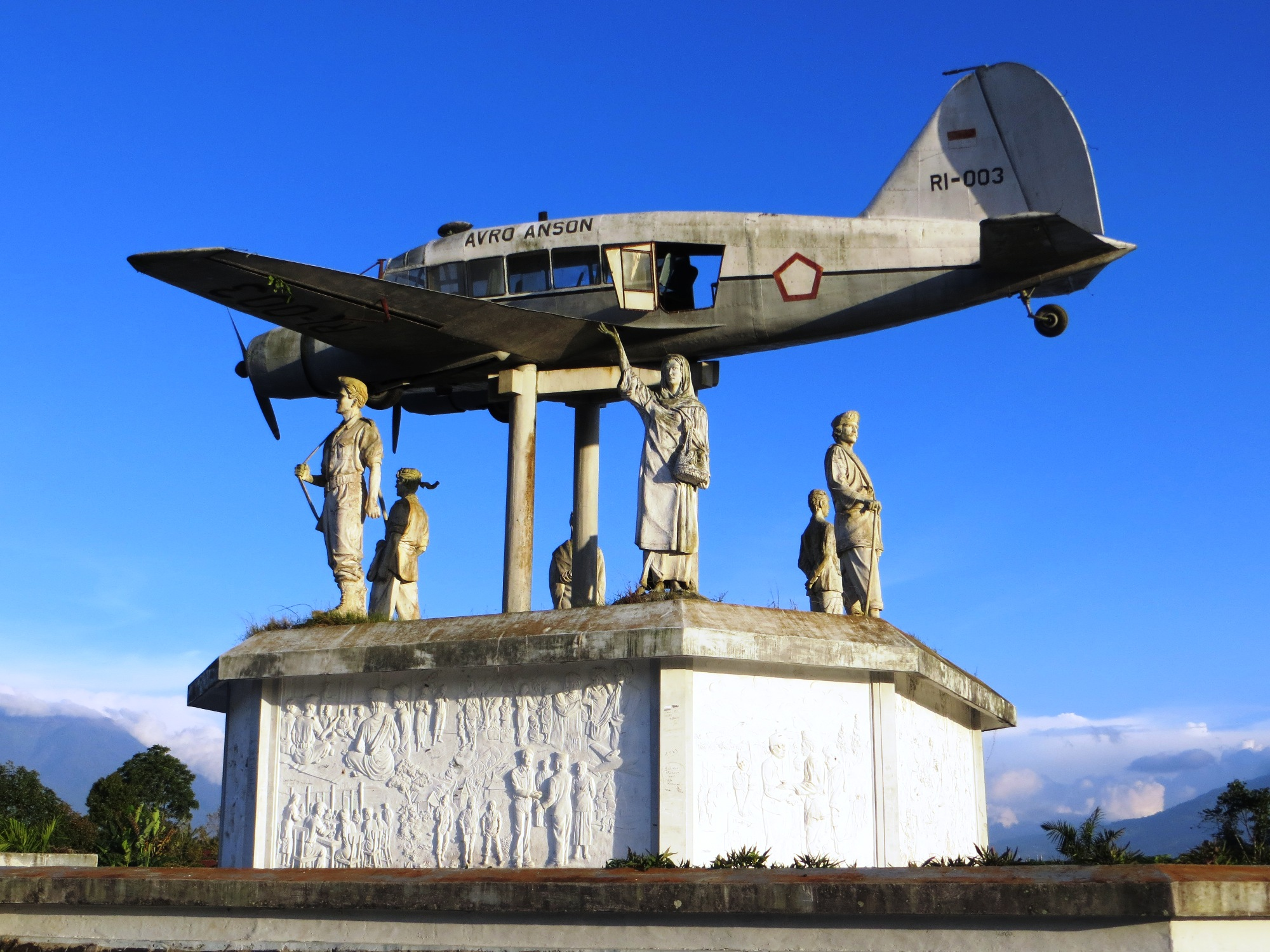
The Avro Anson RI-003 commemoration monument at Bukittinggi, Indonesia

Avro Anson RI-003 is a twin-engined, multi-role aircraft made by the British manufacturer Avro, and the third aircraft owned by the government of the Republic of Indonesia. The aircraft was purchased in early December 1947, was given RI-003 register number, and was used as a military and civil air transport facility.

The effort to purchase this aircraft started with the establishment of the Panitia Pusat Pengumpul Emas (Central Gold Collection Committee) by Mohammad Hatta, Indonesia's first vice president, in Bukittinggi, West Sumatra, on 27 September 1947. The committee aimed at collecting public donations to buy aircraft, in the framework of resistance to Operation Product (now known in Indonesia as the First Dutch Military Aggression), an offensive by Netherlands forces against Indonesian-held territory. The committee was led by A. Karim, a director of the Bank Negara (State Bank). The West Sumatra community collected 14 kg of gold donations, which were used to buy an Avro Anson aircraft in Thailand. The aircraft was previously owned by Paul H. Keegan, an Australian citizen and a former RAF airman. The aircraft was then flown by Keegan himself to the Gadut airfield in Bukittinggi.

At the end of December 1947, Air Commodore Iswahyudi and Air Commodore Halim Perdanakusuma flew the aircraft past the Dutch blockade to garner support from Singapore and Thailand. The two Indonesians then loaded war equipment and medicine in Songkhla, Thailand, but on their way home through Singapore, the aircraft crashed in Tanjung Hantu, Perak Malaya, killing both of its crew. The aircraft pieces were scattered in the sea of Labuhan Bilik, between Tanjung Hantu, Malaya and Teluk Senagih, North Sumatra. Perdanakusuma's body was found, but Iswahyudi's was missing. Iswahyudi's wallet containing three banknotes and cards with his name was found near the sea, among the debris. The two men were later appointed as Indonesian National Heroes. The monument is a replica of RI-003 (former RAF AX505).

== See also ==
- Avro Anson
- Operation Product (First Dutch Military Aggression)

== Bibliography ==
- "Pentagon Over the Islands: The Thirty-Year History of Indonesian Military Aviation". Air Enthusiast Quarterly (2): 154–162. n.d. ISSN 0143-5450.
- Subhanie, Dzikry (7 January 2017). "Sejarah Pesawat RI-003 yang Jatuh di Tanjung Hantu". Sindonews (in Indonesian).
- Soedarmanta, J.B. (2007). Jejak-Jejak Pahlawan: Perekat Kesatuan Bangsa Indonesia (in Indonesian). Gramedia Widiasarana Indonesia.
- Sejarah TNI Angkatan Udara: 1945-1949 (in Indonesian). Vol. 1 dari Sejarah TNI Angkatan Udara, Indonesia. Subdisjarah Diswatpersau. 2004.
