= Kunhadi =

Lebanese organization

- Formation: 2006
- Type: Road Safety Non-Profit Organization
- Purpose: Kunhadi strives to be the pioneer in youth awareness on road safety in Lebanon and the region.
- Location: Lebanon
- Website: http://kunhadi.org/kunhadi/index.php

Kunhadi (Arabic " كُن هادي ", English "be calm") is a non-profit organization concerned with road safety in Lebanon. Kunhadi is aimed at raising road safety awareness, especially among young people. The organization was established in 2006 after Hady Gebrane died from a car crash at age 18.

Kunhadi's work includes lobbying and advocacy. Its main focus is on improving dangerous driving behaviors, such as speeding, drunk driving, not wearing helmets or seat belts and driving while fatigued or distracted.

== Activities in Lebanon ==
=== Road Safety Conferences ===
"Road Safety Sessions" are interactive road safety sessions at schools, universities and corporations. They strive to explain the role of each road user in improving road safety.

Since 2013, Kunhadi collaborates with the United Nations Interim Force in Lebanon in Lebanon to raise awareness among the children of South Lebanon. While Kunhadi presents the safety rules, the UNIFIL implement exercises with the children.

=== Road Safety Awareness Campaigns ===
In 2009, Kunhadi collaborated with USAid to launch "Spreading the Road Safety Project" that included the production of 32 public service announcements explaining the importance of road safety and respecting the Lebanese traffic law in less than 20 seconds. As part of this project, and funded by USAid, Kunhadi launched campaigns to raise awareness about the dangers of drunk driving and speeding.

In 2013 and 2014, Kunhadi collaborated with Alfa and organized two national campaigns to raise awareness on the danger of using the phone while driving.

In 2015, on the occasion of Valentine's Day, Kunhadi launched a road safety awareness campaign encouraging people not to speed on the roads.

=== Taxi Night ===
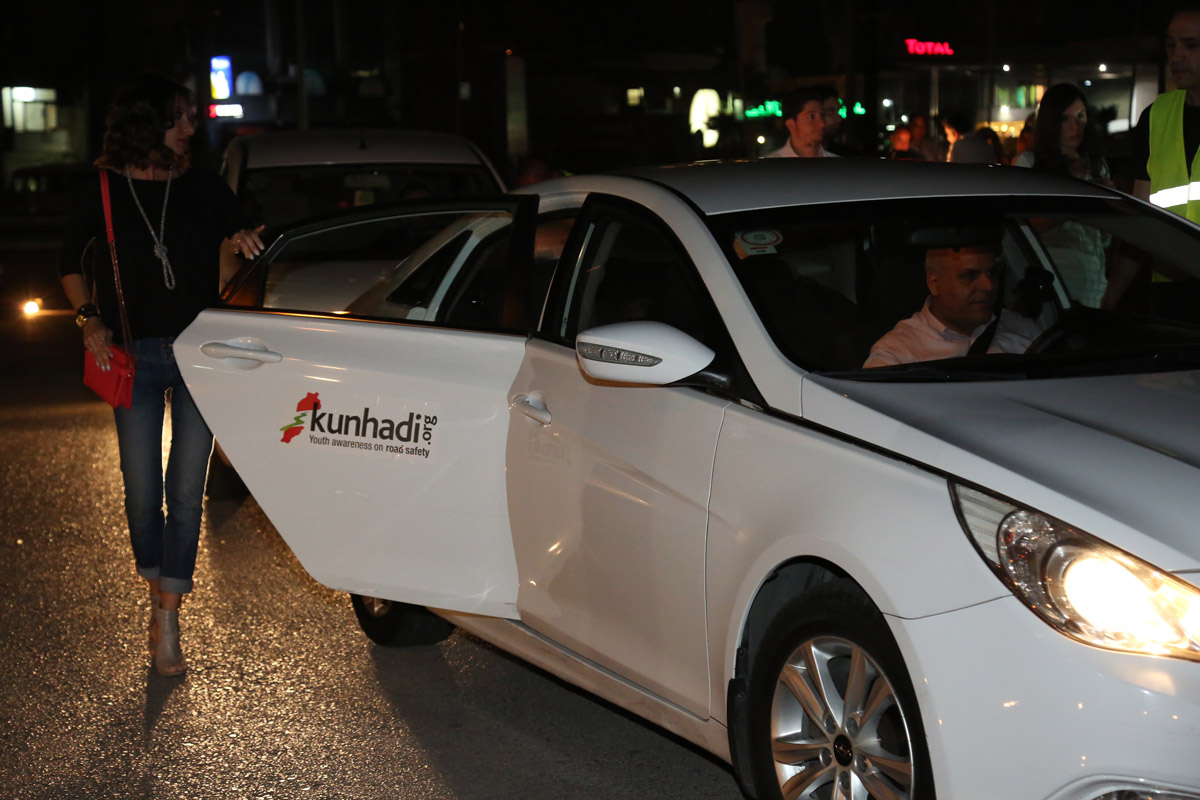
Taxi Night 18th Edition

Taxi Night is a party that takes place at the most sought-after nightclubs in Lebanon, where guests arrive to and leave the party in taxi cars offered free of charge by Kunhadi, as the use of personal cars is prohibited.

Kunhadi created the concept of Taxi Night in 2007 with the aim of decreasing drunk driving incidents by introducing a culture of "taxiing safely back home" as a practical and trendy alternative to drunk driving and fatigue driving. This unorthodox method of raising awareness against drunk driving came as a result of Kunhadi's work methodology that shies away from more classic ways of communication, to speak the language of youth.

By May 2017, Kunhadi had organized eighteen editions of Taxi Night.

=== Road Infrastructure ===
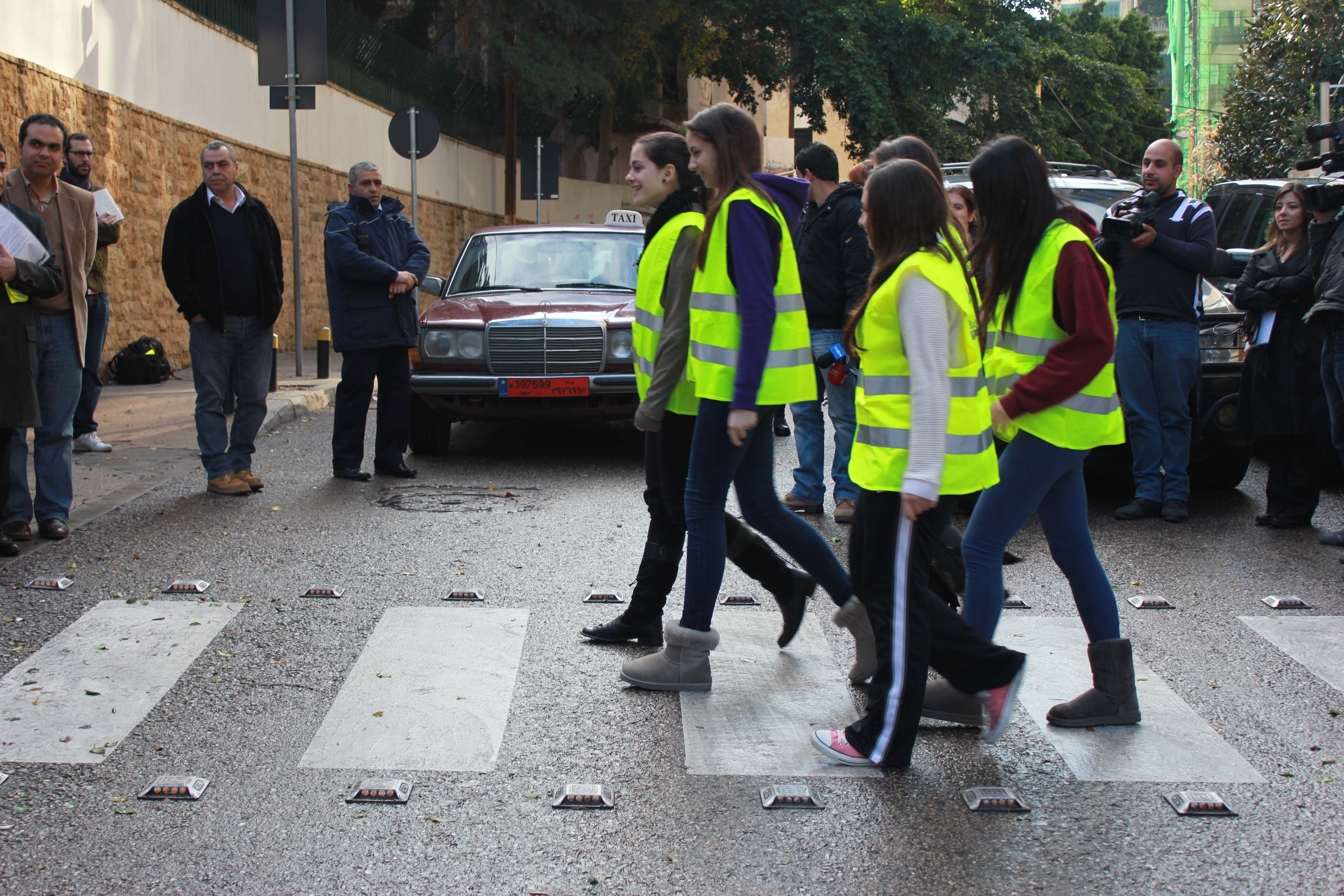
Safe Crossing in front of International College - 2011

Kunhadi launched a campaign for pedestrian safety in November 2011 that included the installation of pedestrian crossings in front of schools in Lebanon.

Since it first launched the campaign in 2011, Kunhadi installed pedestrian crossings in front of 13 schools. The organization also follows up the installation with workshops to teach school students, staff members and parents, on the correct use of the safe crossing.

In 2017, Kunhadi and the Municipality of Beirut partnered up to launch a pedestrian campaign and rehabilitate more than ten pedestrian crossings around Beirut.

In addition to pedestrian safety, Kunhadi installs retro-reflective and fluorescent road signs to

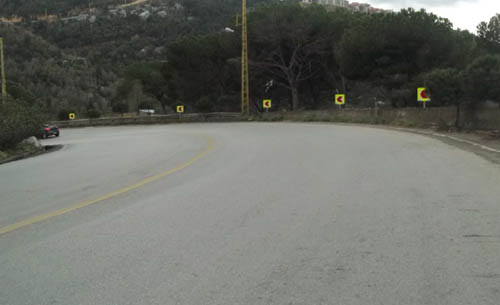
Reflective markings on Bekfayya Road

highlight dangerous curves on under-lit the roads to keep them visible to drivers at night.

In the years between 2010 and 2014, Kunhadi installed reflective markings on seven under-lit highways and dangerous points.

To fund both projects, Kunhadi resorts to fundraising events and partnerships with the private sector and grants from international organizations.

=== Helmets Distribution ===
In 2010, Kunhadi collaborated with the "Global Helmet Vaccine Initiative" and offered 1,200 helmets to delivery boys along with a series of conferences about road safety.

=== World Day of Remembrance for Road Traffic Victims ===
On the occasion of World Day of Remembrance for Road Traffic Victims organized by UN every year since 2005, Kunhadi organized in November 2013 and 2014 a commemorative ceremony in Sin el Fil, in collaboration with the Municipality.

=== Highlighting awareness against Drunk-Driving on New Year’s Eve ===
Seeing the high number of drunk-driving related crashes on New Year's Eve, Kunhadi decided in NYE 2012–2013 to offer free taxis to nightclubs to be offered for free to clients too intoxicated to drive. Thanks to the success of this campaign, Kunhadi made it a yearly activity on every NYE and on 2014–2015, Kunhadi covered 60 Taxi rides and prevent over 60 people from risking their lives by drunk driving.

=== Save The Night ===
Every year, more than 850 people die on the road in Lebanon, making car crashes happening at night the number one cause of death among youth aged between 15 and 29. To tackle this issue, Kunhadi introduced Save the Night, a comprehensive initiative managed and powered by Kunhadi, aiming to raise awareness of the risks of drunk and fatigue-driving; discouraging harmful and underage consumption of alcohol as well as improving safety standards at nightlife venues; hence decreasing car crashes happening at night.

It does this by providing nightlife stakeholders (venue staff, taxi companies/drivers and valet parking staff) with specialized and professional training that will enable them to create a safer environment for young partygoers.

=== Nap and Go ===
Since fatigue driving is one of the main reasons behind road crashes, Kunhadi initiated the concept of nap spots where drivers could take a 10-minute power nap that will enable them to drive alert for approximately 45 minutes. In partnership with two companies from the private sector, Kunhadi installed ten "Nap & Go" spot labeled at a renowned gas stations around Lebanon. The spots are located along busy highways on the coast, mountains, and Beqaa Valley.

=== Wedding Service ===
Kunhadi offers a wedding-customized taxi service which provides professional taxi service to guests who plan ahead on taking a taxi, as well as professional chauffeurs for other guests who take their cars to the wedding but find themselves unable to drive back home. The service includes placing cars with extra drivers at the exit of the venue for anyone who wishes to use the cabs/drivers.

=== RODGE Joins Kunhadi's Board of Trustees ===
Being a huge supporter of Kunhadi's cause since Taxi Night inception in 2007, RODGE has already supported Kunhadi in several Taxi Night events and road safety radio campaigns.

== International activities ==
=== Make Roads Safe ===
In 2007, the FIA Foundation attempted to collect over one million signatures for a petition to submit to the United Nations to ask for Road Safety measures to be taken (by Governments, Private Sectors and NGOs) in the aim of saving millions of lives over the next decade.

=== Decade of Action ===
The UN General Assembly decided to initiate the Decade of Action for Road Safety from 2011 to 2020 in May 2011.

Kunhadi launched its program with four ambassadors: actor and screenwriter Georges Khabbaz, actress Carmen Lebbos, dancer and choreographer Alissar Caracalla and talk show host Tony Baroud.

In 2013, Kunhadi launched within the frame of the Decade of Action, a national campaign focused on Pedestrian Visibility and the importance of staying visible on the road. As a part of this project, Kunhadi distributed and sold retro-reflective bracelets all over Lebanon.

In 2014, Kunhadi organized a campaign called "Race on track. Drive on the road" to tackle speeding and drunk driving on the most dangerous axe of Lebanon, Antelias - Byblos highway, within the frame of the Decade of Action. As a part of this campaign, Kunhadi teamed up with a group of students from Jesus and Mary School in Antelias to make the area around the school safer for pedestrians.

In 2015, the UN launched a global campaign called #SaveKidsLives. Children and experts at the United Nations Road Safety Collaboration wrote a Declaration to voice the demands of children to feel safer on the roads.

=== Global Alliance of NGOs for Road Safety ===
In 2015, Kunhadi joined the Global Alliance of NGOs for Road Safety and participated in the 4th Global Meeting in Marrakesh on March 13 and 14, 2015. The objective of the meeting was to help NGOs to coordinate their activities and to share their best practices.

== Additional sources ==
- Kunhadi organization campaigns to build awareness on hazards of reckless driving
- Kunhadi road safety NGO turns 5 - Donats to ISF
- Skybar urges clubbers drink/drive Kunhadi taxi night
- Aridi/Kunhadi/Ministry partner to resolve road problems
- USAID press release
- What is the best advertising in 2011
