= Podhořany u Ronova =

- Municipality
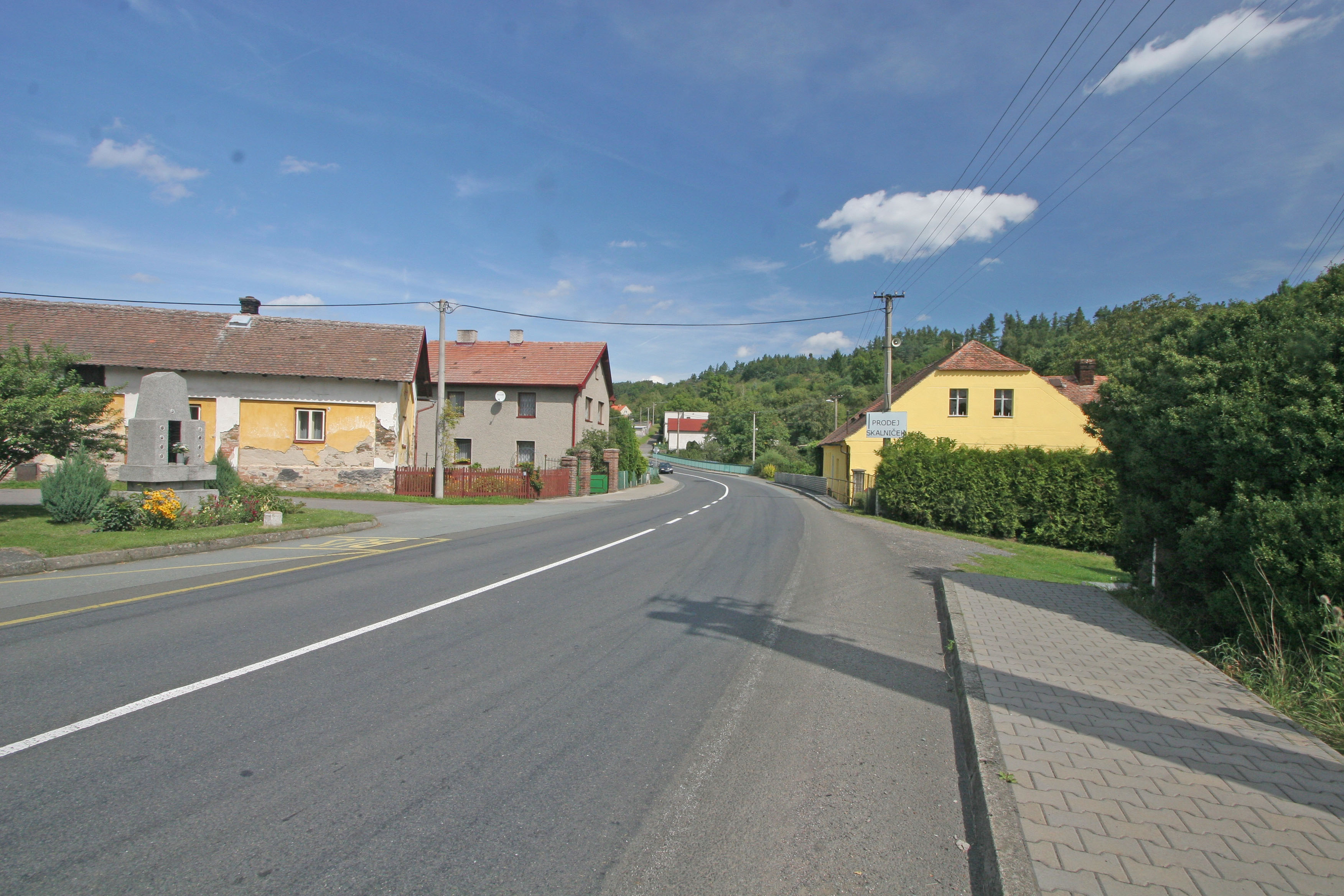
- Main road

- Flag Coat of arms

- Location in the Czech Republic
- Coordinates: 49°56′10″N 15°32′12″E
- Country: Czech Republic
- Region: Pardubice
- District: Chrudim
- First mentioned: 1356

Area
  - Total: 5.34 km^{2} (2.06 sq mi)
- Elevation: 284 m (932 ft)

Population (2026-01-01)
  - Total: 275
  - Density: 51.5/km^{2} (133/sq mi)
- Time zone: UTC+1 (CET)
  - Summer (DST): UTC+2 (CEST)
- Postal codes: 538 03, 538 41
- Website: www.podhorany.cz

Podhořany u Ronova is a municipality and village in Chrudim District in the Pardubice Region of the Czech Republic. It has about 300 inhabitants.

== Administrative division ==
Podhořany u Ronova consists of three municipal parts (in brackets population according to the 2021 census):

- Podhořany u Ronova (162)
- Bílý Kámen (40)
- Nový Dvůr (44)

== History ==
The first written mention of Podhořany u Ronova is from 1356, when there was a fort.

== Demographics ==
Historical population
Year	Pop.	±%
1869	726	—
1880	743	+2.3%
1890	685	−7.8%
1900	636	−7.2%
1910	677	+6.4%
1921	629	−7.1%
1930	577	−8.3%
1950	436	−24.4%
1961	469	+7.6%
1970	461	−1.7%
1980	419	−9.1%
1991	326	−22.2%
2001	299	−8.3%
2011	244	−18.4%
2021	246	+0.8%
Source: Censuses
