= Abdel-Halim Caracalla =

Artistic director of Lebanese dance company

Abdel-Halim Caracalla is the founder and the artistic director of the Lebanese dance company Caracalla Dance Theatre, a company which would evolve into the first and most prominent dance theatre of the Middle East, creating a new language based upon the disciplines of western technique intertwined with the identity, movement and traditions of Arab cultural heritage.

Since 1968 Caracalla created over twenty ballets and musicals including adaptations of Shakespeare’s A Midsummer Night’s Dream, Taming of the Shrew and Much Ado About Nothing.

The dance company has established a theatre in Beirut, which is home to the Caracalla Dance School.

== Early life ==
Abdel Halim Caracalla was born in 1940 in Heliopolis, one of the most formidable ancient Roman cities of the world, where the temples of Jupiter, Bacchus and Venus, stand majestically in the Bekaa valley of Lebanon. Heliopolis, known today as Baalbeck, is where Caracalla spent his childhood inspired by these temples and grew to become the pole vaulting champion of Lebanon and the Arab world under the upbringing of his Greek coach who installed in him the Spartan spirit. Baalbeck was also home to the renowned International Arts Festival which attracted the most famous artists from around the world. Inspired by the dance companies which were performing every summer in front of the Roman temples, Caracalla was mesmerized by the skill of the dancers and their ability to move with such grace and perfection. It wasn’t long thereafter that Caracalla, at the height of his athletic ability, hung up his sports attire and followed the call of his destiny.

For a young man from Lebanon and the Arab world, let alone from Baalbeck, to embark in the early 60s in search of learning how to dance, was frowned upon. Against the wishes of his family, Caracalla embarked in pursuit of his ambitions and dreams, challenging time and era, home and country, and made his way to London to discover the world of dance.

In a twist of fate, Caracalla became student at the London School of Contemporary Dance where he received his Master’s in Choreography under none other than Martha Graham, who forever would leave her mark on the young apprentice.

== Career ==
In 1968, he went on to found the Caracalla Dance Theatre, a company which would evolve into the first and most prominent dance theatre of the Middle East, creating a new language based upon the disciplines of western technique intertwined with the identity, movement and traditions of Arab cultural heritage.

Throughout the fifty years, Abdel Halim Caracalla maintained his artistic message with worldwide performances from the Osaka Fair Japan to the Kennedy Centre and Carnegie Hall in the United States, Sadler's Wells and the English National Opera in London, Théâtre des Champs Elysées and Palais des Congrès in Paris, Lenin Palace in Leningrad, São Paulo and Rio de Janeiro Opera Houses, Frankfurt Opera House, the National Centre for the Performing Arts Beijing as well as other reputable venues throughout the Middle East, Africa, the Far East, Northern and Southern America.

Since 1968 Caracalla created over twenty ballets and musicals, some adapted from Shakespeare, others inspired by history, legends and tradition. He performed at reputable theatres and cultural cities across the world. He collaborated with internationally renowned artists pioneers in the world of theatre such as Maestro Franco Zeffirelli, Italian scenographer Ezio Frigerio, avant-garde director Hugo de Ana, video director Sergio Metalli, lighting designer Vinicio Cheli, set designer Giuliano Spinelli and many more.

Caracalla is viewed by many as the guardian of culture and heritage of the Arab world and has promoted the arts and culture from the Middle East in an unprecedented way. His achievements have been celebrated by various cultural foundations, heads of states, kings and emirs, honoring him with an array of awards and recognitions.

== Awards & Recognitions ==
The Caracalla Dance Theatre, along with its founder Abdel Halim Caracalla and director Ivan Caracalla, has received international recognition and awards for its choreography, which combines Middle Eastern dance traditions with Western techniques.

=== Presidential awards ===
- President Elias Hraoui of Lebanon
- President Emile Lahoud of Lebanon
- President Ben Ali of Tunisia
- President Ben Bella of Algeria
- President Bou Taflika of Algeria
- President Sulaiman of Lebanon
- President Khalifa bin Zayed Al Nahyan – United Arab Emirates

=== Presidential recognitions ===
- Empress Farah Diba of Persia
- King Hussain of Jordan
- President Franjieh of Lebanon
- Prince Mikaza of Japan
- President Borgiba of Tunisia
- President Amin Gemayel of Lebanon
- Sheikha Moza of Qatar

=== Recognitions ===
- Key of Los Angeles
- Key of Las Vegas
- Royal Shakespeare Association UK
- Prime Minister Hariri of Lebanon

=== Awards ===
- Said Akl decoration
- Beirut International Awards Festival
- Antonin University
- Elias Hraoui Outstanding Achievements
- Murex D’or
- Notre Dame University
- Bipod Contemporary Dance Festival
