= Moustafa Ali Abdel Halim =

Egyptian weightlifter

Personal information
- Nationality: Egyptian
- Born: 1 November 1943 (age 81)
- Height: 1.52 m (5 ft 0 in)
- Weight: 52 kg (115 lb)

Sport
- Sport: Weightlifting

Moustafa Ali Abdel Halim (born 1 November 1943) is an Egyptian weightlifter. He competed in the 1976 Summer Olympics.
