= Abdul Halim Tokmakçioğlu =

Turkish fencer

Personal information
- Born: 1 July 1913

Sport
- Sport: Fencing

Abdul Halim Tokmakçioğlu (born 1 July 1913, date of death unknown) was a Turkish fencer. He competed in the team sabre events at the 1936 Summer Olympics.
