= Abdel-Halim Nowera =

Egyptian conductor and impresario

- Born: June 16, 1916
- Died: January 30, 1985 (aged 68)
- Citizenship: Egypt
- Occupations: Musician; Composer; Conductor; Chapelmaster

Abdel-Halim Nowera (died 1985) was an Egyptian conductor and impresario. In 1967 he founded the Arab Music Company (renamed the Abdel Halim Nowera Ensemble for Arabic Music after his death), a music ensemble dedicated to performing traditional Arab music like muwashshah and taktosha. The company has performed at music festivals and on tours internationally.
