= Abdel Halim Hassan =

Egyptian footballer

International career
Years	Team	Apps	(Gls)
- Egypt

Abdel Halim Hassan was an Egyptian footballer. He competed in the men's tournament at the 1928 Summer Olympics.
