= Abdel Halim Messaoudi =

Tunisian writer

- Born: Abdel Halim Messaoudi; 1965 (age 60–61); Jerissa, El Kef Province, Tunisia
- Occupations: Writer, theater critic, university professor and producer of television cultural programs
- Notable work: Al-Rawha (theatrical script)

Abdel Halim Al Masoudi, also known as Al Zoghlami, is a Tunisian writer, theater critic, university professor, and producer of television cultural programmes born on July 1, 1965 in Jérissa, El Kef.

== His Life ==
Abdel Halim Al-Masoudi, holder of a Bachelor's degree in Arabic Language and Arts from the Faculty of Arts and Humanities April 9, previously worked since the 1990s in the written press as a cultural editor and editor-in-chief at the government newspaper "Al-Sahafa" affiliated with Dar Lapras before entering university teaching after obtaining a degree In-depth studies in aesthetics on the message of "theatrical space aesthetics" He obtained a doctorate in theories and techniques of arts for his thesis on Tunisian theater entitled "Tunisian Theatre, Aesthetic and Political Dialectics." He taught aesthetics at the Higher Institute of Fine Arts at the University of Sousse, and theater literature at the Faculty of Arts at Manouba University, and he is currently teaching theory and theater criticism at the Higher Institute of Dramatic Art in Tunis.Appointed as an advisor at the Tunisian Ministry of Culture (2018–2020). He participated in many jury committees in Arab theater festivals, managed intellectual seminars at the Carthage Theater Days Festival, and contributed to many theater seminars in the Arab world (Damascus, Amman, Fujairah, Alexandria, Manama) and Europe (Strasburg, Edinburgh, Rome, Milan)

He also produced cultural television programs of an intellectual nature, such as the "Maghrebna in Tahrir and Enlightenment" program on Nessma satellite channel (2011–2016), and the “Republic of Culture” program (2017–) on the first Tunisian national channel.

== His writings ==
Swaddles and shrouds, articles on public affairs, Dar Afaq – Perspective Publishing, Tunisia, 2014 – (ISBN 9789938843286)

Bazaars, Attempts in Public Affairs, Dar Afaq – Perspective Publishing, Tunis, 2015

Bourguiba and the Theatre, Reading in the Spectra of a Constitutive Statement (study), Afaq Publishing House, Tunisia, 2016

The Republic of Fools, Texts, Dar Afaq – Perspective Publishing, Tunisia, 2017.

Fire and Ashes, Reading in the Experience of the New Theater Troupe (Derasa), Dar Afaq – Perspective Publishing, Tunisia, 2018

Tunisian Theatre, Paths of Modernity (study) Sharjah: The Arab Theater Authority, 2018 – (ISBN 9789973752178)

Al-Rawaha, (theatrical text), Meskliani Publishing House, 2019

Juhayman's Kaaba, (theatrical script), Meskliani Publishing House, 2020.

== TV shows ==
“Our Maghreb in Liberation and Enlightenment" program (2011–2016) on Nesma Tunis TV

The "Republic of Culture" program (2017–present) on the Tunisian national channel

== Awards ==
- 2013: Academia Award granted by Manouba University for the best cultural program on Tunisian television for his program "Our Maghreb in Liberation and Enlightenment" on Nessma TV.
- 2019: The Salah Al-Qasab Prize for Theatrical Creativity awarded by the Salah Al-Qasab Prize for Arab Theatrical Creativity for his theatrical script "Al-Rawha"
- 2019: ISESCO (Islamic World Educational, Scientific and Cultural Organization) prize for the best audiovisual production in the Arab and Islamic world for the enlightening cultural program “Republic of Culture” on the first Tunisian national channel in the “Tunisia Capital of Islamic Culture” event, 2019.
- 2019: The National Order of Cultural Merit (Class IV) No. 173 of 2019 dated October 21, 2019, which was awarded by Mohamed Nasser, the acting President of the Republic of Tunisia.
