= Halim Alizehi =

Halim Alizehi حليم عليزهي
- Village
- Location within Iran
- Coordinates: 31°03′55″N 61°25′33″E
- Country: Iran
- Province: Sistan and Baluchestan
- County: Hirmand
- Bakhsh: Central
- Rural District: Dust Mohammad

Population (2006)
  - Total: 51
- Time zone: UTC+3:30 (IRST)
  - Summer (DST): UTC+4:30 (IRDT)

Halim Alizehi (Persian: حليم عليزهي, also Romanized as Ḩalīm ʿAlīzehī; also known as Ḩalīm) is a village in Dust Mohammad Rural District, in the Central District of Hirmand County, Sistan and Baluchestan Province, Iran. At the 2006 census, its population was 51, in 14 families.
