= Halim Medaci =

Algerian footballer (born 1983)

Personal information
- Full name: Halim Medaci
- Date of birth: April 20, 1983 (age 43)
- Place of birth: Nanterre, France
- Height: 1.83 m (6 ft 0 in)
- Position: Forward

Youth career
- 2002–2003: AS Cannes

Senior career*
Years	Team	Apps	(Gls)
2003–2007	Le Havre AC	52	(2)
2009–2011	UJA Alfortville	29	(1)
- * Club domestic league appearances and goals as of 16 August 2010 ‡ National team caps and goals as of 16 August 2010

Halim Medaci (Arabic: حليم مداسي) (born April 20, 1983, in Nanterre) is a footballer. He is currently without a club, after last playing as a defender for UJA Alfortville. Born in France, he chose to represent Algeria at international level

== International career ==
Medaci received his first call-up to the Algerian National Team for a friendly match against Burkina Faso on November 15, 2006, where he was an unused substitute. He was called up again for a 2008 African Cup of Nations qualifier against Cape Verde, but here too remained an unused sub.
