= Halim Benmabrouk =

Algerian footballer (born 1960)

Personal information
- Full name: Abdelhamid Halim Ben Mabrouk
- Date of birth: 25 June 1960 (age 66)
- Place of birth: Lyon, France
- Height: 1.80 m (5 ft 11 in)
- Position: Midfielder

Senior career*
Years	Team	Apps	(Gls)
1982–1990	RC Paris		
1990–1991	Bordeaux		
1991–1992	Lyon		

International career
1986	Algeria	3	(0)
- * Club domestic league appearances and goals

Abdelhamid Halim Ben Mabrouk (Arabic: عبد الحميد حليم بن مبروك; born 25 June 1960) is an Algerian former professional footballer who played as a midfielder. He spent his club career in France and played for Algeria internationally, most notably at the 1986 FIFA World Cup.
