= Haleem Brohi =

Pakistani author and journalist

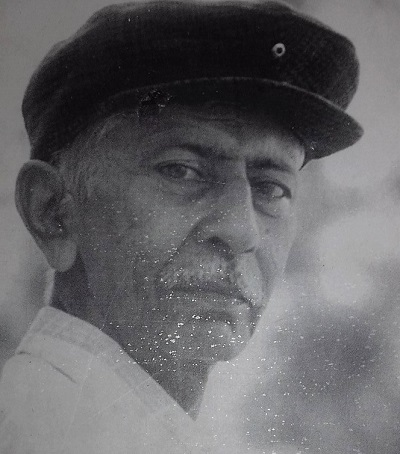
- Died: Hyderabad, Sindh
- Occupations: Writer, Journalist

Haleem Brohi (5 August 1935 – 28 July 2010, Hyderabad) was a Pakistani author and journalist, active in the Sindhi language. He is considered the second greatest satirist is Sindhi literature after Ali Mohammad Brohi.

== Education and family ==
Brohi was the son of Aziz Brohi, a police officer. He graduated from the University of Sindh in 1956 and completed his LLB in 1960. He was married with four daughters.

== Career ==
In his early career, he practiced law and also served at Sindh University in various capacities. He retired from Sindh University as chief accountant in 1980.

== Literary career ==
Brohi started writing in 1967. He published more than ten books. Amongst them were, in English: Solo Decayed, Nothing In Particular, Nothing In Earnest and in Sindhi: Haleem Show, Orah ["Inferno"] (1975) and Hitler ji Kahani (1972), all in the early to mid-1970s.

Brohi was also instrumental in creating a Latin alphabet for the Sindhi language, and was a regular contributor to a popular Sindhi daily.

== Death ==
Brohi died of a heart stroke at a local hospital in July 2010. He was buried in the Cantonment graveyard in Hyderabad.

== Awards ==
In 2009, Brohi was awarded the Shah Latif Award by Sindh Chief Minister, Syed Qaim Ali Shah.
