= Halim Perdanakusuma =

Indonesian airman and National Hero of Indonesia

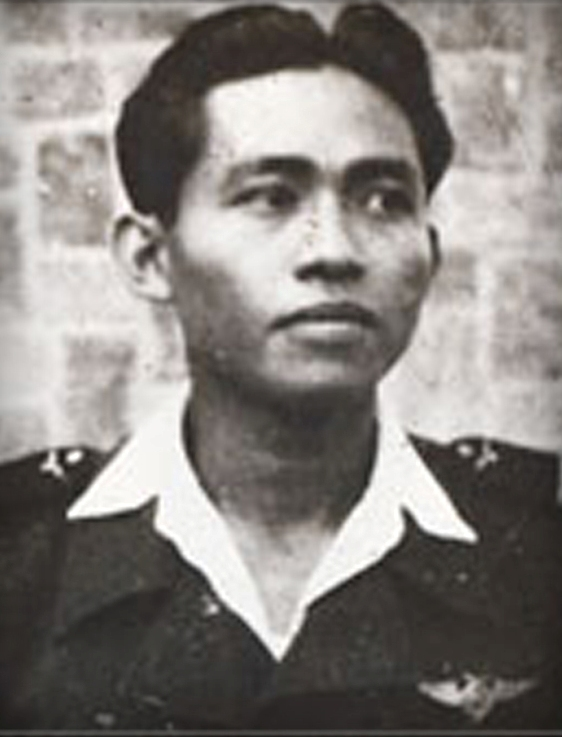
- Born: 18 November 1922; Sampang, Madoera Residency, Dutch East Indies
- Died: 14 December 1947 (aged 25); Perak, Malayan Union
- Burial place: Kalibata Heroes' Cemetery; 6°15′26″S 106°50′47″E
- Spouse: Koesdalina (m. 1947)
- Children: 1
- Relatives: Indriati Iskak (sister-in-law)
- Military career
- Allegiance: Dutch East Indies; United Kingdom; Indonesia
- Branch: Netherlands Indies Navy; Royal Air Force; Indonesian Air Force
- Service years: c. 1940–1947
- Rank: Air Vice-Marshal
- Awards: National Hero of Indonesia

Air Vice-Marshal Abdul Halim Perdanakusuma (18 November 1922 – 14 December 1947), better known as Halim Perdanakusuma, was an Indonesian airman and National Hero of Indonesia.

== Life ==
Halim Perdanakusuma Abdul Halim Perdanakusuma was born on 18 November 1922 in Sampang, Madura, as the third child of the five children of Abdulgani Wongsotaruno, a prime minister and writer, and Raden Ayu Aisah. His maternal grandfather, Raden Ngabeki Notosubroto, was a wedana in Gresik. His younger brother, Makki (1928–2014), followed his footsteps as an airman and later was married to actress Indriati Iskak. After attending elementary and middle school at schools for native Indonesians, he attended the Opleidingschool voor Inlandsche Ambtenaren (a school for the training of native officials) in Magelang. However, he dropped out in his second year and joined the Naval Academy of Surabaya to answer the Dutch colonial government's call for a militia. After finishing the academy, he spent some time in the Dutch Colonial Navy's information department.

At the time of the Japanese invasion of the Indies in 1942, against which he had been trained to fight, Perdanakusuma was in Britain, training in navigation with the Royal Canadian Air Force; as part of his training, he flew on 44 missions throughout Europe, including flying Avro Lancasters in bombing missions over Nazi Germany.

After the end of World War II, Perdanakusuma returned to newly independent Indonesia. He joined the nascent military (then called the Tentara Keamanan Rakyat; People Security Army) under Commodore Suryadi Suryadarma; together with Agustinus Adisucipto and Abdul Rahman Saleh, he was tasked with organizing the Indonesian Air Force.

In 1947, Perdanakusuma was promoted to air commodore and tasked with establishing a branch of the air force in Bukittinggi, West Sumatra; to complete his task he penetrated the Dutch blockade of the island. Air Officer Iswahyudi was also tasked to assist with managing the base. At the time, the various air units in Sumatra were managed individually and under the command of the army; Perdanakusuma and Iswahyudi proceeded to unite them into their own branch.

On 17 August 1947, he led paratroops into Borneo. He was married to Koesdalina in Madiun, on 24 August 1947, and later moved to Sumatra to continue the task of building the air force there. That December, Perdanakusuma was ordered to fly to Thailand with Iswahyudi to pick up medical supplies. On their return trip on 14 December, the Avro Anson they were flying stalled, leading it to crash outside of Tanjung Hantu, Malaysia, killing both of them. Perdanakusuma's body was originally buried in Lumut, Malaysia, but later relocated to Kalibata Heroes' Cemetery in 1975. His only child, Ian Santoso, was born after his death and named after his deceased friend during the World War II in Europe. Santoso later went to became a pilot and joined Indonesian Air Force, following his father footsteps.

== Legacy ==
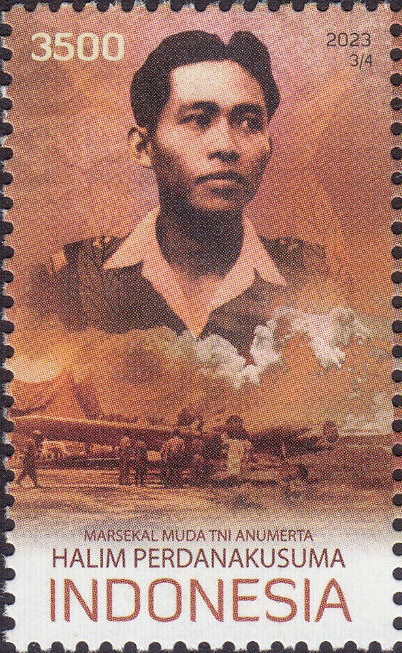
Halim Perdanakusuma on a 2023 stamp of Indonesia

Perdanakusuma was declared a National Hero of Indonesia on 9 August 1975 with Presidential Decree Number 063/TK/Year 1975. With this declaration came a posthumous promotion to air vice marshal.

Halim Perdanakusuma International Airport in Jakarta is named after him. An interchange railway station near the airport which serves the Greater Jakarta LRT and Jakarta-Bandung high-speed rail is also named after him.
