= Caracalla Dance Theatre =

The Caracalla Dance Theatre is a dance company based in Beirut, Lebanon.

== History ==
In 1968, Abdul Halim Caracalla founded the Caracalla Dance Theatre. Theatre is also home to the Caracalla Dance School.

== Performances ==
Caracalla created over 18 ballets and musicals including adaptations of Shakespeare's A Midsummer Night’s Dream, Taming of the Shrew and Much Ado About Nothing.

== Press reviews ==
"I doubt the London stage has seen such textile beauty, such opulent headdresses, such marvels clashes of brocade and braid. Caracalla Dance Theatre have made their own bridge between East and West. Set ebulliently to Ravel's Bolero which sounds better than usual when played on Arabian instruments… better 2001 Caracallas than one Béjart". (Daily Telegraph, UK)

"Caracalla Dance Theatre's played to standing-room only crowds over the weekend at the Kennedy Centre… In fact, the stage has never sparkled and throbbed as the Opera House did at Saturday's performance by this entrancing Lebanese troupe… Clearly, it's good to be king of the musical theatre world in the Middle East". (The Washington Post, USA)

"The company of dancers dressed in Abdel Halim Caracalla's fabulous costumes, stomped their way into our hearts by loving every minute of it. 2 Stars for Boris Eifman's Red Giselle, 3 Stars for Caracalla's Thousand and One Nights". (Sunday Express, UK)

"A contemporary dance form that blend the great of the Orient with the earthiness of Western modern dance… A new language of movement which fuses modern Western Traditions". (Evening Standard, UK)

"Costumes are sumptuous, with fabrics and designs sourced from all over the Arab world by Caracalla; every costume is handmade and unique, and shimmers with vibrant colours; dance sections by the company are infectious". (Sunday Telegraph, UK)
