= List of Lebanese women artists =

This is a list of women artists who were born in Lebanon or whose artworks are closely associated with that country.

== A ==
- Layal Abboud (born 1982), singer, entertainer, poet, dancer, model
- Cyrine Abdelnour (born 1977), singer, actress, model.
- Lamia Maria Abillama (born 1962), photographer, former lawyer
- Zeina Abirached (born 1981), illustrator, graphic novelist, comics artist
- Etel Adnan (1925–2021), painter, writer
- Nancy Ajram (born 1983), singer, television guide
- Suzanne Alaywan (born 1974), poet, painter
- Nour Ardakani (born 2001), singer, dancer, model
- Zena Assi (born 1974), painter

== B ==
- Lara Baladi (born 1969), photographer, multimedia artist
- Mouna Bassili Sehnaoui (born 1945), painter, writer
- Reem Bassous (born 1978), artist
- Carla Nazih al-Berkashi (born 1983), singer
- Julia Boutros, (born 1968), singer

== C ==
- Huguette Caland (1931–2019), painter, sculptor, fashion designer, based in Los Angeles
- Youmna Chlala, contemporary artist, writer
- Saloua Raouda Choucair (1916–2017), painter, sculptor

== D ==
- Annabel Daou (born 1975), singer
- Grace Deeb (born 1967), performance artist, sculptor
- Maya Diab (born 1980), singer, entertainer, actress, television personality

== F ==
- Derrie Fakhoury (1930–2015), painter, medallist
- Myriam Fares (born 1983), singer, dancer, actress, entertainer
- Janet Feghali (1927–2014), singer, actress
- Sabine Foushou (born 1988), musician

== G ==
- Laure Ghorayeb (1931–2023), writer, artist, critic
- Mai Ghoussoub (1952–2007), writer, artist, human rights activist

== H ==
- Diana Haddad (born 1976), singer, television personality
- Joumana Haddad (born 1970), poet, human rights activist
- Nouhad Haddad (born 1934), singer
- Joana Hadjithomas (born 1969), filmmakers, artists
- Nada El Hage (born 1958), poet, writer
- Rana Hamadeh (born 1983) artist
- Yasmine Hamdan (born 1976), singer, songwriter, actress
- Dina Hayek (born 1982), singer
- Maritta El Helani (born 1958), poet, writer
- Amal Hijazi (born 1997), singer, composer, songwriter
- Dominique Hourani (born 1985), recording artist, actress, beauty queen.
- Mona Hatoum (born 1952), Palestinian installation artist.
- May Hariri (born 1968), singer, actress

== J ==
- Ghada Jamal (born 1955), painter
- Lamia Joreige (born 1972), visual artist, filmmaker
- Emily Jacir (born 1972), artist, filmmaker

== K ==
- Najwa Karam (born 1966), singer, songwriter, fashion icon
- Mireille Kassar (born 1963), contemporary artist
- Helen Khal (1923–2009), painter, writer, editor
- Dalida Khalil (born 1987), actress, singer
- Zena El Khalil (born 1976), contemporary artist, writer, activist
- Elissar Khoury (born 1972), singer, recording artist
- Joelle Khoury (born 1963), pianist, jazz and contemporary classical music composer
- Tania El Khoury (born 1982), live artist
- Ferial Karim (1938–1988), actress, singer

== L ==
- Nadine Labaki (born 1974), actress, director
- Yolande Labaki (born 1927), painter

== M ==
- Pascale Machaalani (born 1969), singer
- Seta Manoukian (born 1945), artist, painter
- Mona Maraachli (born 1958), singer
- Shakira Mebarak (born 1977), singer, dancer, songwriter
- May Murr (1929–2008), poet, writer

== N ==
- Emily Nasrallah (1931–2018), writer and women's rights activist
- Maya Nasri (born 1976), Lebanese singer
- Nadine Nassib Njeim (born 1984), actress, beauty queen
- Shirin Neshat (born 1957), Iranian visual artist

== R ==
- Noura Rahal (born 1973), singer, actress
- Majida El Roumi (born 1956), singer

== S ==
- Rola Saad (born 1978), pop singer, model
- Nicole Saba (born 1974), singer, actress
- Nadia Saikali (born 1936), graphic artist
- Carole Samaha (born 1972), singer, actress, performer
- Laurice Schehade (1908–2009), poet, novelist
- Mouna Sehnaoui (born 1945), painter, writer and artist
- Dolly Shahine (born 1985), Lebanese singer
- Rania Stephan (born 1960), video artist, filmmaker
- Carole Sakr (born 1969), singer
- Pascale Sakr (born 1964), singer

== T ==
- Suzanne Tamim (born 1977), singer
- Hiba Tawaji (born 1987), singer, actress, director
- Lidya Tchakerian (born 1959), painter
- Nadia Tueni (1935–1983), poet
- Samira Toufik (born 1931), singer, actress

== W ==
- Haifa Wehbe (born in 1972), Lebanese singer

== Y ==
- Paola Yacoub (born 1966), painter, photographer

== Z ==
- Nazira Zain al-Din (1908–1976)), poet, scholar
- Maya Zankoul (born 1986), writer, visual artist, blogger
- Salwa Zeidan (active since 1988), painter, sculptor
- Lamia Ziadé (born 1968), illustrator, visual artist, based in Paris
- May Ziade (1886–1941), poet, essayist and translator
- Nawal Al-Zoghbi (born 1971), singer
