= List of female Lebanese singers =

This list of women singers from Lebanonincludes female singers who have at least one parent from Lebanon.

== List ==
=== Present ===
Name	Birth	Portrait	Notes
Abeer Nehme	1980		—
Alia Al-Mundhir			—
Aline Lahoud	1981		—
Amar	1986		—
Amal Hijazi	1977		—
Allien Orvelian			—
Aline Khalaf	1974		—
Bassima	1973		—
Brigitte Yaghi	1987		—
Cyrine Abdelnour	1977		—
Cynthya Karam	1980		—
Clauda Chemaly	1974		—
Carole Samaha	1972		—
Darine	1974		—
Darine Hadchiti	1981		—
Dalida	1985		
Dalida Khalil	1988		—
Dana Halabi	1985		—
Dania Khatib	1973		—
Dalal Shemali			—
Dolly Shahine	1985		—
Dominique Hourani	1985		—
Diana Haddad	1976		—
Dina Hayek	1982		—
Eliane Mahfouz			—
Elissa	1971		—
Fadwa Obeid			—
Fairuz	1935		Most renowned and influential Arab singer of all-time, along with Umm Kulthum
Georgette Sayegh			—
Ghada Shbeir	1972		—
Grace Deeb	1975		—
Hiba Kawas	1972		—
Hiba Tawaji	1987		Semi-finalist of The Voice: la plus belle voix, main female role in the new edition of Notre-Dame de Paris
Hoda Haddad	1944		
Hiyam Younes	1932		
Haifa Wehbe	1972		—
Inaya Jaber			—
Jacqueline Monroe	1936		–
Joana Mallah	1976		—
Julia Boutros	1968		—
Katia Harb	1976		—
Karol Sakr	1969		—
Laura Khalil	1976		—
Layal Abboud	1982		Lebanese pop-folk singer, composer, concert dancer, Muslim humanitarian and businesswoman
Layla Iskandar	1984		—
Majida El Roumi	1956		—
Madeline Matar	1972		—
Marie Suleiman			—
Maria Nalbandian	1983		—
Maya Diab	1978		—
Maya Nasri	1976		–
Maya Nehme	1987		—
Marwa	1974		—
Mashael	1984		—
Manel Mallat	1987		—
Mona Maraachli	1958		—
May Hariri	1968		—
May Nasr	1965		—
Myriam Fares	1983		—
Myriam Klink	1970		—
Mayssam Nahas	1976		—
Dalida Rahmeh	1960		—
Melissa	1982		—
Nadine Saab	1979		—
Nadina Zarifeh	1979		—
Nancy Afiouny	1984		—
Nancy Ajram	1983		—
Naya	1992		—
Najwa Karam	1966		–
Nawal Al Zoghbi	1972		–
Noura Rahal	1973		—
Nourhanne	1977		—
Nicole Saba	1974		—
Nelly Maatouk	1988		—
Nelly Makdessy	1979		—
Oumeima El Khalil	1966		—
Pascale Sakr	1964		—
Pascale Machaalani	1967		—
Razan Moughrabi	1973		—
Rola Saad	1978		—
Rima Khcheich	1974		—
Re-Mi Bendali	1979		—
Sabine	1988		—
Sara Al Hani	1986		–
Salma Mousfi			—
Samira Tewfik	1935		—
Tania Saleh	1969		—
Taroob	1937		–
Viviane Mrad	1980		—
Yara	1983		—
Yasmine Hamdan	1976		—

=== Past ===
Nuhad Fatouh	Birth–death	Portrait	Notes
Udit Kaado	1927–1997		—
Souad Mohamed	1926–2011		—
Salwa Al Katrib	1953–2009		—
Seham Refki	1922–2007		—
Najah Salam	1931–2023		—
Suzanne Tamim	1977–2008		—
Sabah	1927–2014		—
Ferial Karim	1938–1988		—
Laure Daccache	1917–2005		—
Nazik	1928–1999		—
Nahawnd	1926–2014		—
Nour el Houdda	1924–1998		—
