= Iraq at the Islamic Solidarity Games =

- IOC code: IRQ
- NOC: National Olympic Committee of Iraq
- Medals Ranked 14th: Gold 14 Silver 24 Bronze 19 Total 57

Islamic Solidarity Games appearances (overview)
- 2005; 2013; 2017; 2021; 2025

Iraq has taken part in every edition of the Islamic Solidarity Games since the first tournament held in Mecca, 2005. By 2025, data from the Islamic Solidarity Sports Federation shows that Iraqi competitors have secured 57 medals in total — including 14 gold, 24 silver, and 19 bronze. Overall, Iraq holds the top 14 position in the medal table as off the last Islamic Solidarity Games held in Riyadh, Saudi Arabia.

== Medal tables ==
=== Medals by Islamic Solidarity Games ===
Host nation

Below is the table representing all Iraqi medals in the games. Until now, Iraq has won 57 medals (14 gold, 24 silver, and 19 bronze).

Games	Athletes	Gold	Silver	Bronze	Total	Rank	Notes	RF
(Saudi Arabia) 2005 Mecca		9	9	7	25	5th	details	
(Iran) 2010 Tehran	Canceled							
(Indonesia) 2013 Palembang		2	1	1	4	13th	details	
(Azerbaijan) 2017 Baku		2	7	5	14	13th	details	
(Turkey) 2021 Konya	Didn't Participate							
(Saudi Arabia) 2025 Riyadh		1	7	6	14	22nd	details	
(Malaysia) 2029 Selangor	Future event							
Total		14	24	19	57	14th	-	-

== See also ==
- Iraq at the Olympics
- Iraq at the Paralympics
- Iraq at the Asian Games
- Iraq at the Arab Games
- Sports in Iraq
