= List of Layal Abboud live performances =

A List of tours, concerts and festivals held by Lebanese singer Layal Abboud.
Abboud abstains from performing during Islamic month of Ramadan. After the end of Ramadan, on the occasion of Eid al-Fitr, she restart her concert managing.

== Tours and concerts ==
Date	Country	Venue	Promoting album/songs	Performance(s) / Details
April 27, 2008	Jordan	Kanabay Restaurant, Amman		Including a press conference about her album, Fi Shoo'
February 12, 2011	Lebanon	Nocean Restaurant, Tyre		A Valentine's Day show; Duet with Jad Khalifa
February 14, 2011	Lebanon	Beirut		A Valentine's Day show
November 1, 2011	Lebanon	Camille Chamoun Sports City Stadium, Beirut		An Art and Word Festival show
August 1, 2011	Lebanon	Orient Prince Hotel, Beirut		LAF National Day show, Honorary Awarded
December 31, 2011 – January 1, 2012	Lebanon	Beirut		New Year's Eve; Two times, Tamar Rotana -Gallery Samaan and Nakhil Restaurant-Dbayeh
January 1, 2013	Lebanon	Beirut		New Year show
July 31, 2013	Lebanon	Jounieh Officers Club	Khashkhash hadid El Mohra	LAF National Day show; With Melhem Barakat
August 23, 2013	Lebanon	Martyrs' Square, Beirut		Lebanese Peace Festival
March 21, 2014	United Arab Emirates	Crowne Plaza Hotel, Abu Dhabi		Mother's Day
June 15, 2014	Lebanon	Wazzani, Hasbaya, Nabatieh		Opening of her 2014 summer festivals
November 22, 2014	Lebanon	Restaurant Atlal Plaza, Beirut	Khatrou Ksarna; Her romantic and patriotic songs	Lebanese Independence Day; With Hisham El Hajj
January 1, 2015	Lebanon	Yarze Officers Club		New Year Ceremony, LAF
January 1, 2015	Lebanon	Shiraz Karam Restaurant, Deir El Zahrani, Nabatieh		New Year Ceremony, Invited by Southern Lebaneses
March 8, 2015	Lebanon	Plaza Palace, Beirut		With Sobhi Toufic
March 15, 2015	Lebanon	Plaza Palace, Beirut		With Amir Yazbek
between March 27 and April 9, 2015	Sweden	Gothenburg		
between March 27 and April 9, 2015	Sweden	Stockholm		
between March 27 and April 9, 2015	Germany	Frankfurt		
April 9, 2015	Switzerland	Restaurant le Cèdre, Zürich		
April 12, 2015	Lebanon	Bnachii, Zgharta, North		Easter
April 14, 2015	Lebanon	Greenland Restaurant, Akkar		
May 2015	China	Macau		
May 5, 2015	Lebanon	Omar Farroukh High School, Beirut		Student day
May 15–16, 2015	Lebanon	Her residence in Achrafieh		Her birthday private party
May 23, 2015	Lebanon	Plaza Palace, Beirut		
May 26, 2015	Lebanon	NDU University		For students of NDU
June 8, 2015	Lebanon	Plaza Palace, Beirut		Invited by Chabibat Labbayka Loubnan
July 18, 2015	Lebanon	Plaza Palace, Beirut		Eid al-Fitr
July 21, 2015	United Arab Emirates	Fairmont Bab Al Bahr, Abu Dhabi		Eid al-Fitr; With Mohammed Assaf
July 27, 2015	Lebanon	Kfertay, Keserwan, Mount Lebanon		Held in Yard of Our Lady of the Annunciation Church
August 2, 2015	Lebanon	Non-com Club, Al Fayadiyeh, Baabda		
August 2, 2015	Lebanon	Plaza Palace, Beirut		
August 16, 2015	Lebanon	Hrajel, Keserwan, Mount Lebanon		
August 21, 2015	Lebanon	Lebaa, Jazzine, South Lebanon		
August 27, 2015	Lebanon	West Bekaa Country Club		With Melhem Barakat
September 8, 2015	Lebanon	Imar, Zgharta, North Governorate		John Maron Day
September 24, 2015	Lebanon	Golden Tulip Hotel De Ville, Beirut		An Eid al-Adha show
September 30, 2015	Lebanon	Yahchouch, Keserwan, Mount Lebanon		Saint Thecla Feast Day
October 13, 2015	Lebanon	Al Rihab Hotel, Zahlé		
November 12, 2015	Lebanon	Plaza Palace, Beirut	Maghanaj	
between November 14–28, 2015	United States	Houston		
February 5, 2016	Lebanon	Kfarshima, Baabda, Mount Lebanon		With Ghassan Khalil
February 20, 2016	Lebanon	Plaza Palace, Beirut	Maghanaj	
March 12, 2016	Lebanon	Plaza Palace, Beirut	Laken	
May 13, 2016	Lebanon	Her residence, Achrafieh	Laken	Her birthday party
May 27, 2016	Egypt	Cairo		
June 6, 2016	Lebanon	Beirut Central District		
July 7, 2016	Lebanon	Plaza Palace, Beirut		Eid ul-Fitr
July 25, 2016	Lebanon	Plaza Palace, Beirut	Mashghoul Bali 3leik	
August 1, 2016	Lebanon	Ain Ebel, Bint Jbeil, Nabatieh	Khatrou Ksarna; Laken br>Maghanaj	LAF National Day
August 7, 2016	Lebanon	Plaza Palace, Beirut	Maghanaj; Mosh Habki	
August 13, 2016	Lebanon	Qousaya, Zahlé, Beqaa	Maghanaj	Awarded by local authorities
August 16, 2016	Lebanon	Lebaa, Jazzine, South Lebanon	Maghanaj	
August 27, 2016	Lebanon	Maghdouché	Maghanaj; Khashkhash hadid El Mohra; Laken; Shid El Jaroufe	
September 5–6, 2016	Lebanon	Plaza Palace, Beirut	Moush Habki	
September 12, 2016	Lebanon	Life-Night Resort, Tyre	Laken; Ana ba3sha2ak	
September 22, 2016	Lebanon	Antelias		Awarded by Guy Aswad
September 25, 2016	Lebanon	Plaza Palace, Beirut		End of Her 2016 Summer Festival
October 1, 2016	Lebanon	Casino du Liban		
October 2, 2016	Lebanon	Plaza Palace, Beirut		
October 4, 2016	Lebanon	Plaza Palace, Beirut		Surprise performance
October 15, 2016	Qatar	Best Western Plus, Doha	Laken; Mosh Habki	Two concerts
October 27, 2016	Australia	White Castle, Sydney		
December 4, 2016	Lebanon	Plaza Palace, Beirut		Eid il-Burbara
January 1, 2017	Syria	Dama Rose Hotel, Damascus	Dinyet Ajayeb	New Year ceremony
January 9, 2017	Lebanon	Plaza Palace, Beirut	Dinyet Ajayeb; Mosh Habki; Maghanaj	
January 29, 2017	Switzerland	Rotana Live Club, Zürich	Dinyet Ajayeb	
February 14, 2017	Lebanon	Plaza Palace, Beirut		A Valentine's Day
February 18, 2017	Cyprus	Merit Park Hotel & Casino, Cyprus	Dinyet Ajayeb; Maghanaj	
May 11, 2017	Lebanon	AUL University, Beirut		Commemoration ball
May 15, 2017	Lebanon	Plaza Palace, Beirut	Mosh Habki	Her birthday party
June 4, 2017	Lebanon	Blat, Marjayoun, Nabatieh	Hader Ya Mester; Maghanaj	
July 2, 2017	Qatar	Doha	Hader Ya Mester; Maghanaj	
July 19, 2017	Lebanon	Bziza, Koura, North Governorate		Folk Awarded
July 29–30, 2017	Lebanon	Diwen kaser el mezza, Ehden		
August 5, 2017	Lebanon	South Lebanon's Urman Training Camp	Hader Ya Mester; Mahanaj khaliha bi albi tijrah Shid El Jaroufe; Khashkhash hadid El Mohra	Invited by LAF
August 8, 2017	Lebanon	Maimes, Hasbaya, Nabatieh		
August 14–15, 2017	Lebanon	Tripoli	Hader Ya Mester	The election of Miss Peace
August 15–16, 2017	Lebanon	Lebaa, Jazzine, South Lebanon		Humorously said that changed her name to " Princess of Festivals", referring to her increased number of festivals
August 16, 2017	Syria	Sheraton Hotel, Saidnaya, Rif Dimashq		Duet with Hussein Al Deek
August 17, 2017	Lebanon	Kfar Nabrakh, Chouf, Mount Lebanon	Hader Ya Mester	
August 19–20, 2017	Lebanon	Mazboud, Chouf	Khashkhash hadid El Mohra; Maghanaj; Hader Ya Mister etc.	
September 1, 2017	Lebanon	Bhamdoun, Aley, Mount Lebanon		Eid al-Adha
September 6, 2017	Syria	Latakia		Her third concert in Syria; Eid al-Adha

== Other notable appearances ==
Date	Show title	Details
June 22, 2014	Chouf Beauty pageant	Performed in Chouf Beauty Queen Election, Le palmier venue, Ramlieh .
May 31, 2016	World Next Top model 2016	Performed Mosh Habki in World Next Top Model 2016 of Lebanon.
July 9, 2016	2016 BIEL, Oriental Night	Participated at the Oriental Night 2016.
December 18, 2016	Arab Tourism Organization of the Arab League	Performed in Mövenpick Hotel & Casino Cairo-Media City, Arab Tourism Festival.
