= Daccache =

Daccache is a surname. Notable people with the surname include:

- Laura Daccache (1917-2005), Lebanese singer and actor
- Zeina Daccache, Lebanese actress and director
