= Nadine (magazine) =

Weekly social Lebanese magazine

- Editor: Aouni Kaaki
- Categories: General
- Frequency: Weekly
- Format: A4
- Publisher: Dar El Shark
- Total circulation: 65,000
- Founded: 1980
- First issue: January 11, 1980; 46 years ago
- Company: Dar El Shark
- Country: Lebanon
- Based in: Minet el Hosn, Beirut
- Language: Arabic, Lebanese Arabic

Nadine (Arabic: نادين:Arabic pronunciation: [nādin] or Nadine Magazine : Arabic: مجلة نادين [majal'lat o nādin]) is weekly social Lebanese magazine publishing by Dar El Shark, from 1980. Interested to star society, the latest gossip, fashion trends, interior design and health and beauty.

== Criticism ==
Nadine has been criticized many times. In August 2017, Layal Abboud condemned an issue of Nadine Magazine for its depiction of her chest and face shape with the words, "Bigger than this chest" emblazoned on its cover, accused the magazine of trying to increase readership by dumbing down and oversimplifying its content.

== Complaints on Nadine ==
- November 2004: Suzanne Tamim.
- May 2007: Najwa Karam.
- Ragheb Alama filed a lawsuit against Nadine, Accused of "Spreading false news, intimidation and slander",
- May 2017: Sherine.
