= Naseem Garden =

Park in Oman

Coordinates: 23.61°N 58.54°E

== Al Naseem Heritage Park ==
Al Naseem Heritage Park is a planned large-scale public green space in the Sultanate of Oman, forming part of a major mixed-use real estate development by Talaat Moustafa Group Holding (TMG Holding). The park is included within one of TMG's integrated urban projects announced in 2025 and is designed as a cultural, recreational, and landscape feature within a coastal development west of Muscat.

== Background ==
In 2025, Talaat Moustafa Group Holding, an Egyptian multinational real estate developer, signed an agreement with the Omani Ministry of Housing and Urban Planning to develop two large mixed-use projects in Oman with a combined value of approximately OMR 1.5 billion (US $4.7 billion). These developments represent one of the largest foreign real estate investments in the country.

One of the projects includes a coastal mixed-use development that integrates residential, hospitality, commercial, and recreational facilities, within which Al Naseem Heritage Park is planned as a central open-space element.

== Development ==
Al Naseem Heritage Park is planned to cover an area of approximately 215,000 square metres, making it one of the larger purpose-built green spaces within a private-sector integrated development in Oman. The park is intended to provide landscaped areas, pedestrian spaces, and scenic views across the surrounding residential and waterfront zones.

The project is being executed by Talaat Moustafa Group Muscat for Real Estate Development, TMG Holding's local subsidiary in Oman. Construction of the park is scheduled to proceed concurrently with other components of the coastal development.

== Design and Features ==
According to project announcements, the park will form part of a broader urban design strategy focused on sustainable planning and lifestyle-oriented development. Planned features include:

- Extensive landscaped green areas
- Pedestrian walkways and open recreational zones
- Cultural and heritage-inspired design elements
- Integration with surrounding residential and waterfront facilities

The park is intended to serve both residents of the development and visitors, contributing to Oman’s broader urban greening and tourism initiatives.

== Significance ==
The inclusion of Al Naseem Heritage Park highlights the increasing role of integrated green spaces within large-scale real estate developments in Oman. The project aligns with national objectives related to urban expansion, tourism growth, and sustainable land use, while marking TMG Holding's first major investment in the Omani real estate sector.

== See also ==
- Talaat Moustafa Group
- Urban development in Oman
- Public parks in Oman
