= Riyadh Al-Azzawi =

Iraqi-British kickboxer

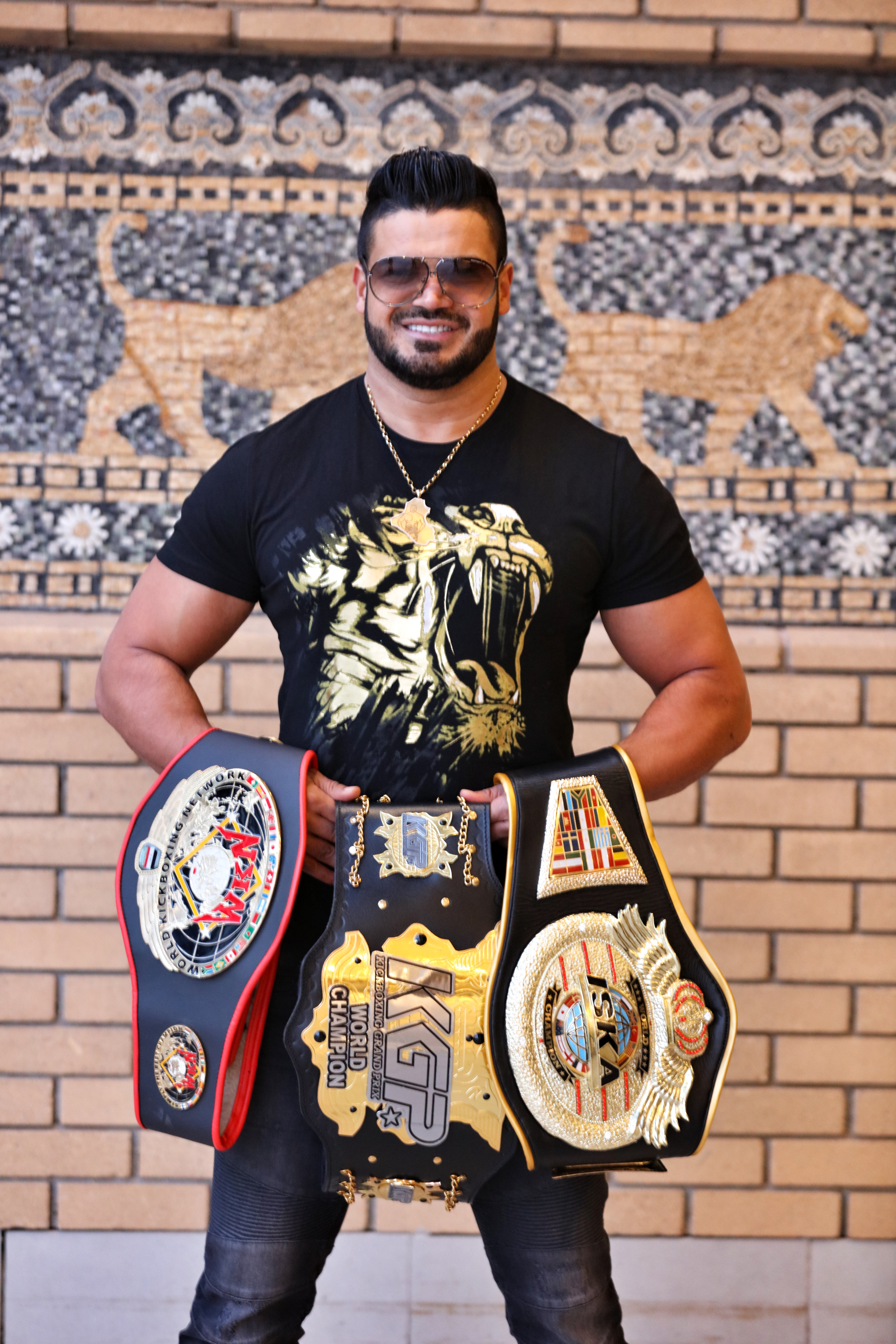
- Riyadh Alazzawi with his, defended 7 times, 3 world heavyweight kickboxing title belts, including: WKN, ISKA and KGP
- Born: 20 February 1986 (age 40); Baghdad, Iraq
- Nationality: Iraqi
- Height: 185 cm (6 ft 1 in)
- Style: Muay Thai
- Stance: Orthodox

Kickboxing record
- Total: 51
- Wins: 51
- Losses: 0

Riyadh Al-Azzawi (Arabic: رياض العزاوي; born February 20, 1986) is an Iraqi-British kickboxer and the 2008 World Kickboxing Network (WKN) World Champion after a fight against 3-times world champion Tomasz Borowiec in the 91 kg category on February 12, 2008, becoming the first-ever Arab World Champion in heavyweight kickboxing with a record 34–0 at the time and is now known as "The Golden Champion". Riyadh Al-Azzawi has a record of 51-0.

== Career ==
Riyadh Al-Azzawi's kickboxing career goes back to a very young age in Iraq. He started his sporting career in Iraq where he became champion, winning the gold medal when he was 15 years old. After winning the Arab Kickboxing Championships, Riyadh moved to London and continued his kickboxing career and was able to maintain his championship title and challenged for the British title. In 2003, Riyadh successfully defended his British title and won the European Championship. He then gained popularity in Britain, Iraq and the Arab World. Al-Azzawi has also worked in arts and promotions, appearing in advertising, sponsorship of athletic items and in a video clip as an athlete.

In 2009, after a one-year hiatus, Riyadh Al-Azzawi returned to training in order to defend his WKN and WKA world championship titles. On March 4, 2016 he defended his World Kickboxing Network world title against American-English, Brian Connor, winning by knockout via spinning back kick.

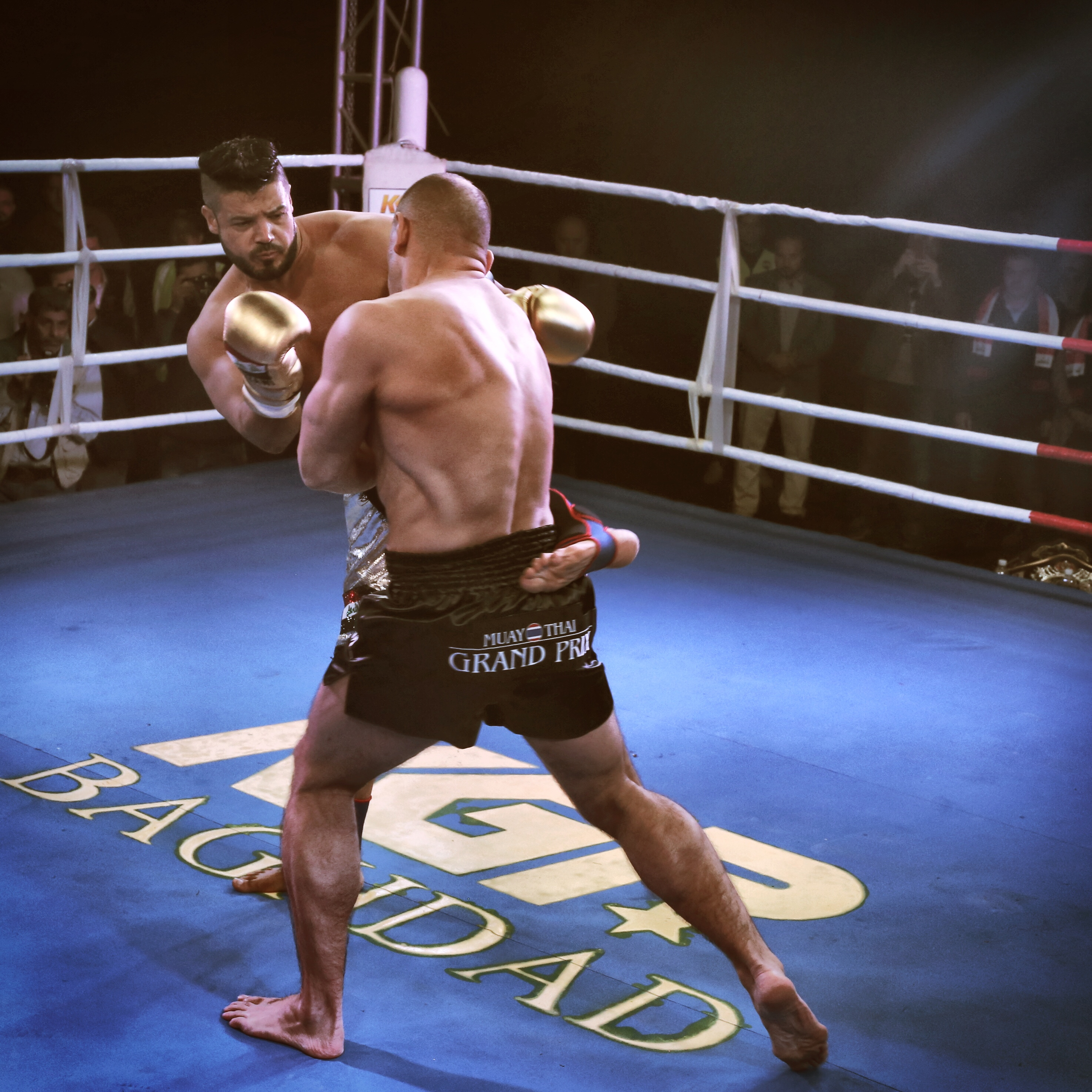
Riyadh Alazzawi fighting for his seventh world heavyweight kickboxing title in his hometown of Baghdad, Iraq.

On November 24, 2017 Al-Azzawi defeated Tanislav Tomashevkii of Poland in the main event at Kickboxing Grand Prix held in Baghdad, Iraq. Al-Azzawi was keen on defending his title in his hometown of Baghdad, Iraq, to bring a story of success to an otherwise war-torn nation.

== Personal life ==
Al-Azzawi is notorious for having two gold vinyl wrapped cars. The first of his cars was a Ferrari 458 Spider. In 2017, Riyadh also acquired a second gold vinyl wrapped car, being a G7 Brabus Mercedes Benz. Aside from his two cars, he is often spotted wearing gold clothing and jewellery. His adoration for the colour is one of the reasons he has won the title of ‘Golden Champion’.

The kickboxing champion passed through a turbulent period in his life because of his association with Lebanese pop diva Suzanne Tamim who was brutally murdered in Dubai. Riyadh Al-Azzawi told The Sunday Times in an exclusive interview that at the time of her murder, he and Suzanne were "married" (this despite vehement claims by Tamim's second husband and manager Adel Matouk that he and Suzanne Tamim were still legally married after she divorced her first husband Ali Muzannar. Matouk claims they had never divorced, despite the couple's bitter conflict and separation).

Riyadh Al-Azzawi had met Tamim, in Harrods in 2006. She was already receiving some threats to her life and he offered to help protect her. The couple became close and reportedly engaged in 2007. Al-Azzawi and Tamim stayed with each other for 18 months before she was murdered in Dubai.

Al-Azzawi said in the interview that Tamim was being subjected to a string of threats and that he warned the London police of these serious threats on Suzanne's life. "I was there to protect her [Suzanne Tamim], but was doing it all by myself", claimed Al-Azzawi, "I didn't get any help". Al-Azzawi said his spouse's former lover, Egyptian business tycoon and member of Egyptian Parliament Hisham Talaat Moustafa had offered her $50m to lure her away from Al-Azzawi and marry him — and threatened to pay a hitman to have Suzanne killed, if she refused to marry him.

Suzanne Tamim's body was found on July 28, 2008 in Dubai. The courts later found she was murdered by an Egyptian former police officer Mohsen al-Sukkari in return for $2 million from the business tycoon Hisham Talaat Moustafa, according to statements made by the suspected murderer to the investigators in Cairo. Consequently, the parliamentary immunity was dropped from Mr. Moustafa and he was arrested and charged. Both el-Sukkari and Moustafa were found guilty and sentenced to death by an Egyptian court on May 21, 2009.

Riyadh currently lives in London.

== Titles ==
- Iraq Champion World Association of Kickboxing Organizations (WAKO)
- Arab Champion World Association of Kickboxing Organizations (WAKO)
- British Champion World Kickboxing Network (WKN)
- European Champion World Kickboxing Association (WKA) and World Kickboxing Network (WKN)
- World Champion World Kickboxing Network (WKN)
- International Sport Karate and Kickboxing Association (ISKA)
- Kickboxing Grand Prix (KGP)

== Sources ==
- Riyadh Al-Azzawi: Heart of a Champion
- The World Winner Title in Kickboxing Riyadh Al-Azzawi vs Tomasz Borowiec
