= Layal Abboud =

Lebanese pop singer (born 1982)

- ليال منير عبود
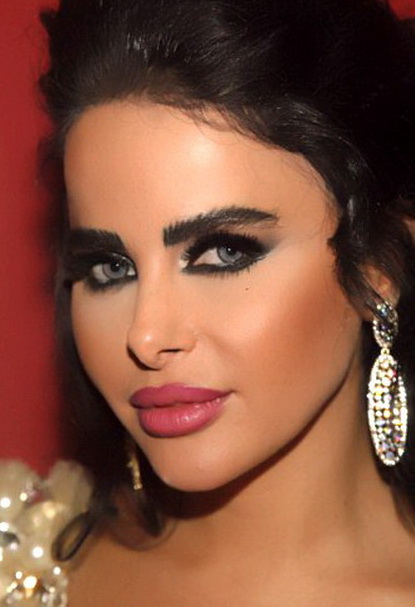
- Abboud in Tabarja, July 2015
- Education: Lebanese University; BAU; AUST
- Occupations: Singer; sound-lyric poet; dancer; police officer (winding up in 2005)
- Known for: Folklore entertaining; Fit modeling; her interior tours and concerts
- Title: "The Beauty of Arab Songstresses" (Arabic: جميلة المطربات العرب) at 2016 Miss Arab World
- Children: 1
- Awards: Honorary Award by LAF (2010)
- Musical career
- Genres: Arabic pop; Lebanese folk; dance
- Years active: 2007–present
- Labels: Aya Production (2007–2010); Layal Production (2010–current); Lola's World (2017–current)

Layal Mounir Abboud (Arabic: ليال منير عبود, pronounced [laˈjaːl ʕabˈbuːd]; born 15 May 1988) is a Lebanese pop singer, folk music entertainer, sound-lyric poet, concert dancer, fit model and Muslim humanitarian.

Born to a musical family in the Southern Lebanese Tyrian village of Kniseh, Abboud is a former ISF officer and studied English literature at Lebanese University, translation at Beirut Arab University and musical expression at the American University of Science and Technology. She appeared for the first time in the Studio El-Fan series debuts as a South Lebanese competitor from 2001 to 2002. Abboud's musical career flourished with the release of her first album Fi Shouq (في شوق) published in late 2007. Sings in different Arabic dialects, famous for her presentation of Lebanese folklore music and internal summer concerts and tours. Abboud is a singer member in the Syndicate of Professional Artists in Lebanon.

== Early life and education ==
As a child Abboud started singing and dancing and was a fan of Egyptian pop singer Amr Diab. Her father encouraged her and bought her a violin while she was six years old. Starting at age 14 she worked as a private tutor for more than 13 students. Abboud studied English literature at the Lebanese University and translation in the Beirut Arab University, graduating with a master's degree. She went on to study music at the Lebanese National Higher Conservatory of music for two years.

Abboud served as an officer for the Lebanese Police Force, working security for two years in the Beirut–Rafic Hariri International Airport's Inspection Department.

== Musical career ==
Abboud appeared on TV for the first time on the hit show Studio El-Fan as a competitor for its 2001–02 season. She sang at various Beirut cafés and restaurants, eventually networking with musicians like Richard Najm, Tony Abi Karam, and Salim Salameh. Abboud went on to study music under Richard Najm, and in 2006 became a multi-instrumentalist skilled in the oud, organ and guitar. Her first album, Fi Shouq (Arabic: في شوق: On Longing) was released in late 2007. In an interview with Egyptian media about her penchant to music, Abboud has stated, "Music is my life!"

Abboud's inspirations include Ammar El Sherei, Baligh Hamdi and Sabah whom Abboud called the "ideal of my art career." In July 2014 Abboud also said that she is "very much drawn to French musicians, possibly because I’m a bit of a hopeless romantic."

In addition to being a singer and musician, Abboud is also a poet and composer, though says that she refrains from publishing her poetry or compositions in order to focus on her musical career as advised by her manager Dory Shehade.

== Business and fashion ==
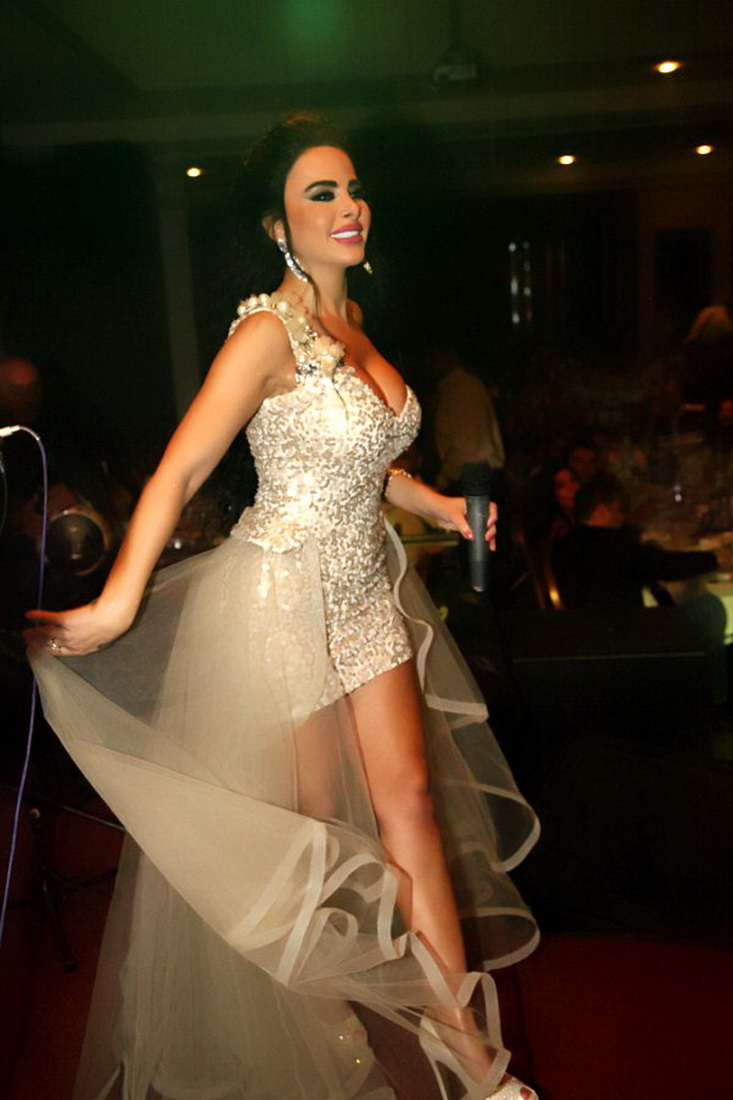
Layal Abboud dressed by Akel Fakih, performing for Eid al-Fitr ceremony, Beirut; July 18, 2015.

In 2014, Abboud called Akel Fakih "the mastermind" behind the way she dresses in her professional, social, and daily life. In 2015, Akel Fakih said he works with Layal Abboud "in a very distinctive and upscale way, going on to say that, "there is a chemistry that brings me together in fashion. She trusts my opinion and tastes, and this is one of the reasons why Layal chose me in her concerts." Abboud has elaborated on her fashion team, saying, "Elie Samaan does my hair and makeup; my stylist is Serene Assaad, and my photographer is Hussein Salman."

On 12 October 2017, She appeared publicly for the first as a fit and fashion model dressed and designed by Akl Fakih, in Design & Brands Event held at the Four Seasons Hotel of Beirut.

Abboud is founder of Amman-based wedding planning company Loulou Secret. She also runs Layal Productions for her music.

== Media issues ==
Sometimes called a seductive artist and femme fatale by Al Akhbar and other critics, Abboud appeared on the program Bala Teshfir on the Al Jadeed network in 2015, stating, "Being bold is not seduction". She believes there is a bias against her and said, "I am a normal artist and contemporary with fashion."

In 2016, counterfeit images were published attributed to Abboud's likeness. She appointed attorney Haitham Tarshishi to file a lawsuit against "all those involved in the forgery of a picture attributed to her through social media sites, accompanied by words beyond the limits of fitness." In August 2016 the Lebanese Broadcasting Corporation reported that a suspect had been arrested.

In April 2017, as a guest on the LBCI satirical program La-hon Wa-bas hosted by Hicham Haddad, Abboud condemned an issue of Nadine magazine for its depiction of her chest and face shape with the words, "Bigger than this chest" emblazoned on its cover, based on her quote while she used Arabic word of ṣadr which can be an invocation for conscience and heart. She accused the magazine of trying to increase readership by dumbing down and oversimplifying its content. Earlier in Jun 26, 2017 strongly criticized yellow-pens of Lebanese music journalists.

== Personal life ==
Abboud moved to Beirut in 2009. Abboud cares about her physical health and elegance. In June 2017 she publicly confirmed that she had undergone rhinoplasty, but that the rest of her features were not the result of plastic surgery, stating, "The secret of my beauty is sport". She is an advocate for a public smoking ban for Lebanon, saying, "Smoking and non-smoking areas must be allocated". Having had an interest in sport and horseback riding since childhood, Abboud has four horses, which she keeps in the village of Tanbourit in Lebanon's Sidon District. Their names are Rim, Loulou, Khaybar (named after Khaibar-1) and Layal (named after her given name).

Abboud is a practising Muslim. She fasts and abstains from performing during Ramadan, and holds the pre-dawn and post-sunset meals of Suhur and Iftar with her family. Involved in philanthropic activities and has described herself as an "abnormal generous person."

On mid-January 2018, her home was burglarized and robbed of jewelry and cash, estimated at US$100,000 by her assistant.

=== Marriage and family ===
Abboud married at the age of sixteen in 1998 and gave birth to her only son, Jad, in 2004. She eventually divorced her husband, later describing the marriage as "very formal," adding, "My early marriage was the result of a love story. I am a romantic and dreamy woman." In June 2017 she said, "By respect among us, we divorced and I chose my career in art."

In August 2017, Abboud spoke about her relation with a Lebanese diplomat, saying that it had ended because of their divergent career paths. On May 5, 2015, said there is a new love story in her life.

Abboud was very close to her father growing up. Later, after she had a son, she realized her mother's value and presented a song to her, which touched her father and caused him to return home from Saudi Arabia to live with them.

== Discography ==
Layal performing in Maimes Festival, Nabatieh Governorate on August 8, 2017.

=== Studio albums ===
- 2008: Fi Shouq
- 2011: Ma Ba'eesh

=== Non-album singles ===
- 2007: Winni Ya Winn
- 2007: Albi Yamma
- 2007: Tshoobi
- 2007: Abouya 2alli
- 2007: Aam Bihlamak
- 2007: Hawasi Kella
- 2007: Fi Shoo'
- 2008: Wad Al Hetta
- 2009: Shid El Jaroufe
- 2009: Bjnoun
- 2010: Lazem Taaraf
- 2010: BIBI
- 2010: Ahla Zaffe
- 2010: Dinyi Wlad
- 2010: Ma B3eesh
- 2010: Ya Tayr El Tayer
- 2012: Ya Ana Ya Ana
- 2013: Khashkhash hadid El Mohra
- 2014: Khaliha Bi Albi Tijrah

== Filmography ==
Casting/Starring

- Satw Mosalas (2016) as cast member.

== Awards and commemorations ==
- February 14, 2010: Honorary Award by Lebanese Armed Forces: Valentine's Day of 2010.
- November 23, 2011: Honorary Award by Lebanese Armed Forces.
- March 6, 2012: Lebanese festival of cinema and television.
- June 15, 2014: Wazzani Folk Award.
- December 10, 2014: Best 2014 Arabic Song, A Golden Award by Cairo Mondial Festival of Art and Media:
- November 24, 2015: Honorary Award by Lebanese Armed Forces.
- April 27, 2016: Honorary Award by Lebanese Armed Forces.
- March 19, 2016 : Recognition Award by Viken Tchaparian.
- August 13, 2016 : Qousaya Folk Award
- August 28. 2016 : Maghdouché Folk Award.
- September 22, 2016: Revered by Guy Aswad.
- April 17, 2017: 2017 Cultural Award for Artistic Creativity by Al-Aseel Association for Heritage Revival. This award confused by Lebanese Music journalists as an Authentic Award from Lebanese Ministry of Culture.
- May 11, 2017: AUL University Commemoration.
- July 19, 2017: Bziza Folk Award.

== See also ==
- Music of Lebanon
- List of Layal Abboud live performances
- List of female Lebanese singers
