= The Nile Hilton Incident =

2017 film

- Film poster
- Directed by: Tarik Saleh
- Written by: Tarik Saleh
- Produced by: Kristina Åberg
- Starring: Fares Fares
- Music by: Krister Linder
- Release dates: 21 January 2017 (Sundance); 29 September 2017 (Sweden)
- Running time: 106 minutes
- Countries: Sweden; Egypt; Denmark; Germany
- Languages: Arabic; Nuer/Dinka

The Nile Hilton Incident (Arabic: حادث النيل هيلتون Hadith Alnayl Hiylton) is a 2017 Swedish thriller film directed by Tarik Saleh. It was screened in the World Cinema Dramatic Competition section of the 2017 Sundance Film Festival. It was awarded the World Cinema Grand Jury Prize: Dramatic. The film discusses the corruption of Egyptian police before the 25 January Revolution. The plot is inspired by the murder of the Lebanese Arab singer Suzanne Tamim in Dubai in 2008. At the 53rd Guldbagge Awards, the film won five awards, including Best Film.

== Plot ==
The narrative revolves around Noredin (Fares Fares), an enigmatic and rugged detective renowned for his chain-smoking habit. Assigned a homicide investigation, he delves into the unsettling murder case of Lalena, a pop star entwined in the world of politics as the mistress of Hatem Shafiq (based on Hisham Talaat Moustafa). The grim discovery of Lalena's lifeless body, her throat brutally slit, occurs within the confines of the eponymous Nile Hilton hotel.

The case takes an intriguing turn as the sole witness to the gruesome crime emerges – a Sudanese maid by the name of Salwa (Mari Malek). Shafiq denies culpability for the murder of Lalena, who, it turns out, collaborated with a sleazy pimp named Nagy (Hichem Yacoubi) to capture compromising pictures of her clients (including Shafiq) to be used as blackmail. Soon it is revealed that Shafiq had a mysterious man (Slimane Dazi) kill Lalena.

== Cast ==
- Fares Fares as Noredin Mostafa
- Mari Malek as Salwa
- Yasser Ali Maher as Kammal Mostafa
- Ahmed Selim as Hatem Shafiq
- Hania Amar as Gina
- Mohamed Yousry as Momo
- Slimane Dazi as Green Eyed Man
- Hichem Yacoubi as Nagui
- Ger Duany as Clinton

== Reception ==
On review aggregator website Rotten Tomatoes, the film holds an approval rating of 91% based on 55 reviews, and an average rating of 7/10. On Metacritic, the film has a weighted average score of 70 out of 100, based on 8 critics, indicating "generally favorable reviews".
