= Cricket in Iraq =

Cricket is a minor sport in Iraq, with the majority of national focus on football. Sporting activity in general has been limited somewhat by the Iraq War and succeeding conflicts. Iraq is not a member of the International Cricket Council, and what cricket is found has been introduced to schools largely through the British Armed Forces, or played between the militaries of the various Commonwealth forces stationed there – most often Australian, British and New Zealand troops.

CricketArchive records matches as having been played in Iraq as early as July 1931, when a two-day match was played in Baghdad between Royal Air Force officers and "casuals" (enlisted ranks). At least one first-class cricketer has been born in Iraq – Zayyad Qayyum (born in Baghdad in 1979), who played Pakistani domestic cricket and represented the Pakistani national under-19 team.

In 2003, a sergeant of the British Royal Logistic Corps petitioned the Marylebone Cricket Club for cricket equipment to be sent to troops in southern Iraq to create a cricket training centre. The equipment was sent to forces in the country, presented by former Test player Mike Gatting. In April 2007 Wisden writer Tony Munroe covered the efforts of Major Andrew Banks, who toured schools in Iraq with a detachment of the Royal Air Force handing out cricket equipment and explaining the laws of cricket to teachers. He recorded that "after some simple explanation of the basic rules of cricket (through an interpreter) and a quick demonstration by members of the RAF, the Iraqi children joyfully hit the ball around the playground. I duly handed over the set to the games mistress and she in turn professed to be keen to allow her charges to play on a regular basis." He noted that "The teachers have seen a lot of projects come out of the West so they were sceptical until they saw the kids having fun" and that "They never quite understood the lbw law but they enjoyed themselves and that was what mattered."

Inter-force cricket matches between various units of the British Army have taken place in the country, and in September 2007 a British Army team were defeated by a team from the Australian military near Basra. The match raised 14,000 US Dollars for charities.

== See also ==
- Sport in Iraq
