= Madinaty =

- suburb
- Location in Egypt
- Coordinates: 30°05′30″N 31°37′50″E
- Country: Egypt
- Governorate: Cairo Governorate
- Time zone: UTC+2 (EET)
  - Summer (DST): UTC+3 (EEST)

Madinaty (Arabic: مدينتى Egyptian Arabic pronunciation: [mæˈdenti], "My City") is a 3,200 hectares (8,000 acres) real estate development project, in the New Cairo satellite city, in eastern Cairo Governorate, Egypt.

== Overview ==
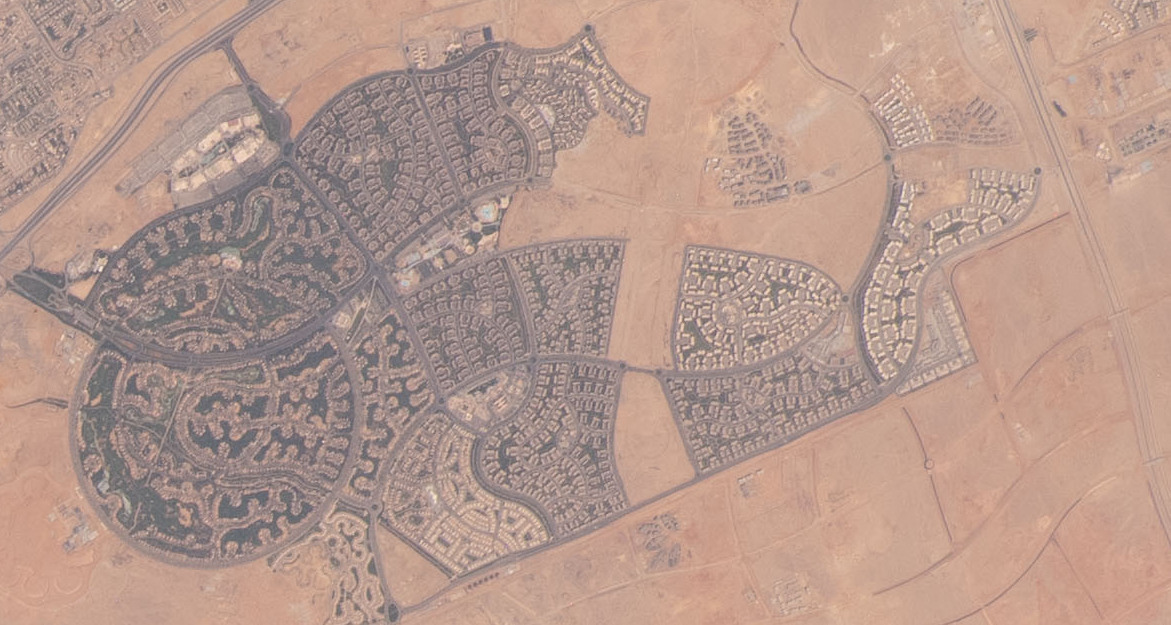
from above

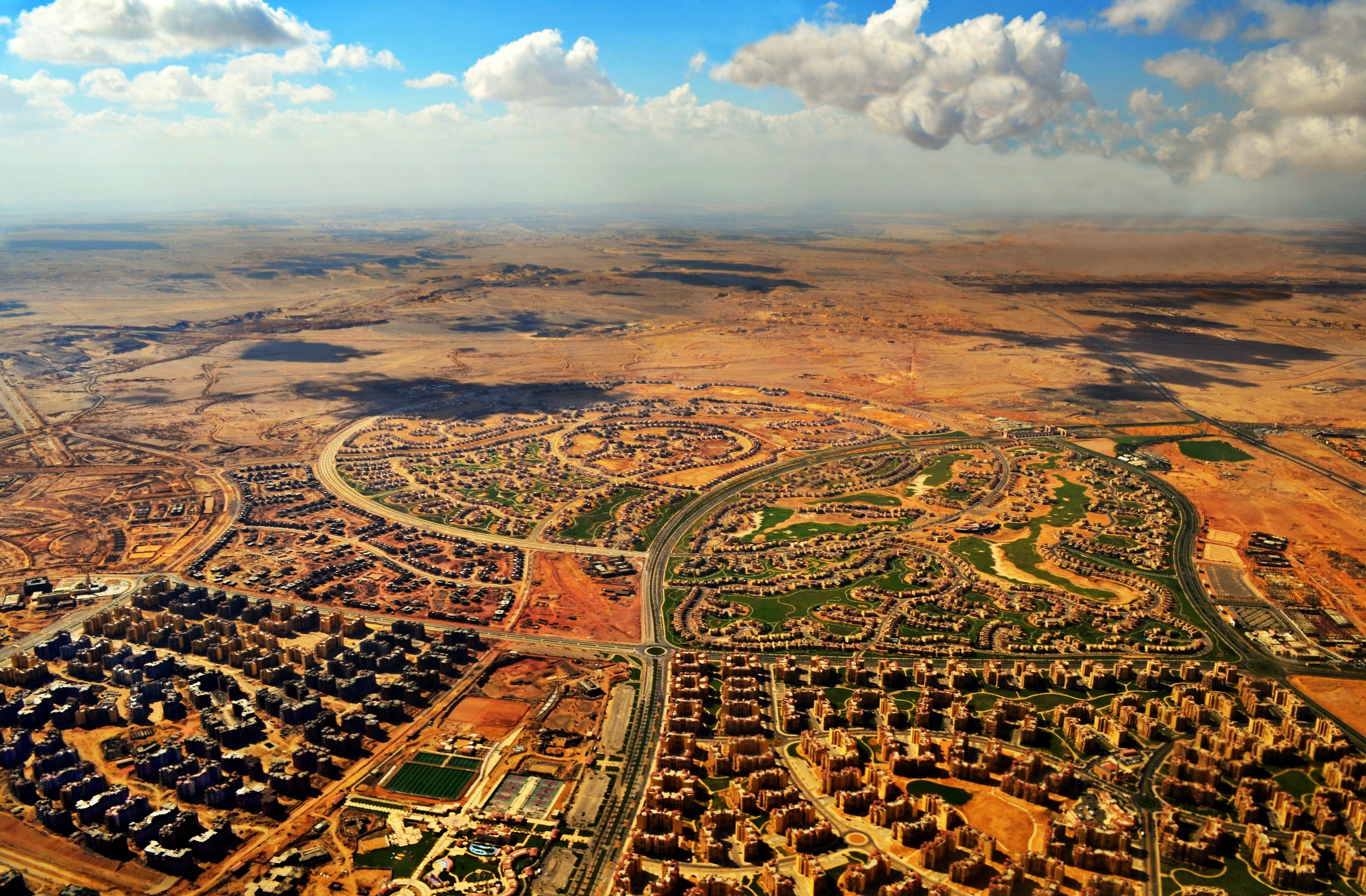
aerial view

The project is developed by the Arab Company for Projects and Urban Development SAE, a subsidiary of the EGX listed Talaat Mostafa Group Holding which is ultimately majority owned by the Egyptian Businessman Talaat Mostafa . The Master Planners are HHCP Design International, Inc. The landscape architects are the SWA group. Construction began in July 2006.

The contract by which the land was granted to the company was challenged in Egyptian courts. Egyptians were angered that the land had been sold below current market value to Talaat Mostafa Group during Mubarak's rule.

Madinaty is being built over an area of 3,200 hectares (8,000 acres), with a total budget of E£800 billion.

In 2016, around 3900 residential units were sold in Madinaty by the Ministry of Housing.

Madinaty is organized into sub-compounds, each offering basic amenities such as supermarkets, mosques, outpatient clinics, and parks. The city layout features wide streets and green spaces throughout.

The residential buildings in Madinaty are primarily eight stories tall with elevators. These buildings vary in design depending on the sub-neighborhood. Apartments feature views of landscaped gardens or parking areas. Security measures are also in place for apartment clusters.

In addition to apartments, Madinaty includes villas, with varying sizes and layouts. These villas come with private roads and balconies, contributing to the diverse residential options in the area.

Privado, a gated neighborhood currently under construction, will feature apartment buildings with extended balconies and double-floor layouts. Planned amenities in Privado include a playground within the sporting club and a tunnel that will connect it to other parts of Madinaty, such as B1, B2, and future areas like B15 and The Spine, which is set for commercial and corporate use. Notably, Privado will not have villas, and its apartment buildings are designed with angled layouts to reduce direct visibility between units.

The city is connected to Cairo through a bus service provided by Madinaty, while smaller buses transport residents within Madinaty, linking key locations such as sub-compounds, malls, parks, and sports facilities. A central bus stop functions as a hub for these transportation services.

Originally planned to meet Cairo’s increasing housing demand, Madinaty’s construction began in 2006. Despite some controversies over land sales during the Mubarak era, the development has steadily progressed, expanding residential areas, amenities, and infrastructure.

Madinaty’s infrastructure includes advanced water and electricity systems that utilize Advanced Metering Infrastructure (AMI) technology for more efficient resource management.

The city’s design balances residential, recreational, and commercial areas, offering facilities like sporting clubs, parks, and shopping centers, aimed at enhancing the living experience for its residents.Madinaty has malls with various shops including restaurants like Open Air Mall, East Hub, Craft zone, The Strip, All Seasons Park. Another food court called South Park with dozens of restaurants such as McDonald's, Pizza Hut, KFC, Hardee's, and Chili's.

Madinaty has a large club with several pools, playgrounds, gym and clubhouse.

== Infrastructure ==
Madinaty uses Advanced Metering Infrastructure for water and electricity distribution.

== Climate ==
Köppen-Geiger climate classification system classifies its climate as hot desert (BWh) as the rest of Egypt.

Climate data for Madinaty
Month	Jan	Feb	Mar	Apr	May	Jun	Jul	Aug	Sep	Oct	Nov	Dec	Year
Mean daily maximum °C (°F)	18 (64)	19.7 (67.5)	23.2 (73.8)	27.9 (82.2)	32.2 (90.0)	34.4 (93.9)	34.9 (94.8)	34.5 (94.1)	31.9 (89.4)	29.7 (85.5)	24.8 (76.6)	20 (68)	27.6 (81.6)
Daily mean °C (°F)	12.8 (55.0)	13.8 (56.8)	16.6 (61.9)	20.4 (68.7)	24.2 (75.6)	26.8 (80.2)	27.8 (82.0)	27.7 (81.9)	25.5 (77.9)	23.4 (74.1)	19.2 (66.6)	14.6 (58.3)	21.1 (69.9)
Mean daily minimum °C (°F)	7.8 (46.0)	8 (46)	10.1 (50.2)	12.9 (55.2)	16.3 (61.3)	19.3 (66.7)	20.7 (69.3)	21 (70)	19.1 (66.4)	17.1 (62.8)	13.7 (56.7)	9.3 (48.7)	14.6 (58.3)
Average precipitation mm (inches)	6 (0.2)	4 (0.2)	4 (0.2)	2 (0.1)	0 (0)	0 (0)	0 (0)	0 (0)	0 (0)	1 (0.0)	4 (0.2)	5 (0.2)	26 (1.1)
Source: Climate-Data.org (altitude: 230m)

== See also ==
- New Urban Communities Authority
- Talaat Mostafa Group Holding
- New Cairo
- New Heliopolis
