= Lamia Maria Abillama =

Lebanese photographer

- Born: 1962 (age 63–64); Lebanon
- Education: Sorbonne, Tufts University, International Center of Photography
- Known for: Photography

Lamia Maria Abillama (born 1962) is a Lebanese photographer.

== Education ==
Abillama was born in 1962 in Lebanon, to Lebanese-Brazilian parents. She studied at the Sorbonne (now University of Paris) in Paris and Tufts University in Boston. She then practised as a lawyer. After taking photography classes at the International Center of Photography in New York City, she began exhibiting her work as a photographer.

== Career ==
Abillama's photo series Clashing Realities consists of portraits of Lebanese women wearing military uniforms, in their homes. Abillama has said that "in asking a group of Lebanese women to put on combat uniforms as a symbol of the violence that has so affected their lives, my aim has been to indicate the extent to which they have been impacted by the decades of conflict."

In 2020 she was included in the exhibition Lebanon Then and Now: Photography From 2006 to 2020 held at the Middle East Institute, Washington D.C.

Her work is included in the collection of the Museum of Fine Arts, Houston and the Museum für Kunst und Gewerbe, Hamburg.

== See also ==
- List of Lebanese women artists
