= Al-Knaissah =

Al-Knaissah الكنيسة
- Municipality
- Location within Lebanon
- Coordinates: 33°15′43″N 35°15′47″E
- Country: Lebanon
- Governorate: South Governorate
- District: Tyre District
- Elevation: 190 m (620 ft)
- Time zone: UTC+2 (EET)
  - Summer (DST): UTC+3 (EEST)
- Dialing code: +961
- Website: بلدية الكنيسة

Al-Knaissah (Arabic: الكنيسة, romanized: al-Knayseh, also Romanized Kanisah, Kniseh) is a municipality in the Tyre District, South Governorate of Lebanon, 10 km southeast of Tyre. Kniseh's most prominent family is Souwaydan

== Demographics ==
In 2014 Muslims made up 100% of registered voters in Al-Knaissah. 99.25% of the voters were Shiite Muslims.

== Notable people ==
- Layal Abboud, singer
