= Mari Malek =

South Sudanese model, DJ, actor and activist

- Born: December 16, 1987 (age 38); Wau, South Sudan
- Occupations: Model, DJ, actress, activist
- Years active: 2011–present
- Known for: Activism, modeling, DJing under the name "DJ Stiletto"

Mari Malek, also known by the stage name DJ Stiletto, is a South Sudanese model, DJ, actress and activist.

== Biography ==
Malek's family is from the Dinka people. Born in Wau, at the start of the Second Sudanese Civil War in the mid-1980s, her mother, was a nurse and her father was a politician. She has four brothers and sisters but her family is much larger, since father had four wives. Due to the escalation of conflict, her mother took Malek and her sister to Egypt where they obtained refugee status. They left for the United States in 1997, first to Newark in New Jersey, then to San Diego in California.

As a teenager, Malek was spotted in the street, and was asked to move to Paris or New York to start a modelling career. She was then called to participate in the show America's Next Top Model but ultimately could not join it due to her visa conditions. She then decided to launch her own career in modeling and moved to New York in 2006. It took her five years to land her first advertising campaign: with Lanvin, she was photographed by Steven Meisel. During this period, she faced racism in the modelling industry and was turned away as agencies would state that they "already had a black girl". Malek subsequently posed for campaigns for Vogue, Rolls-Royce and made appearances in Kanye West's Power video and Lady Gaga's Born This Way. She also worked as a disc-jockey, under the pseudonym DJ Stiletto .

In 2014, Malek created Stand for Education, and organisation aimed at the development of education in South Sudan, in particular by financing schools and reducing obstacles to the education of girls. Her humanitarian work was recognised by the Obama administration. She is also the founder of Runways to Freedom, an organisation that supports refugee models as they begin their careers in the industry.

In 2017, Malek was listed as one of OkayAfrica's 100 Women. Also in 2017, she starred in the film The Nile Hilton Incident, where she played a maid who witnessed an assassination.

== Awards ==
- OkayAfrica's 100 Women - 2017

== Works ==
=== Filmography ===
- 2017: The Nile Hilton Incident by Tarik Saleh: Salwa, the maid.

=== Publications ===
- Malek, M. (2019), “The Rock in the Stream”, Conflict and Forced Migration ( Studies in Symbolic Interaction, Vol. 51 ), Emerald Publishing Limited, p. 91-128
