= Reem Bassous =

Lebanese artist

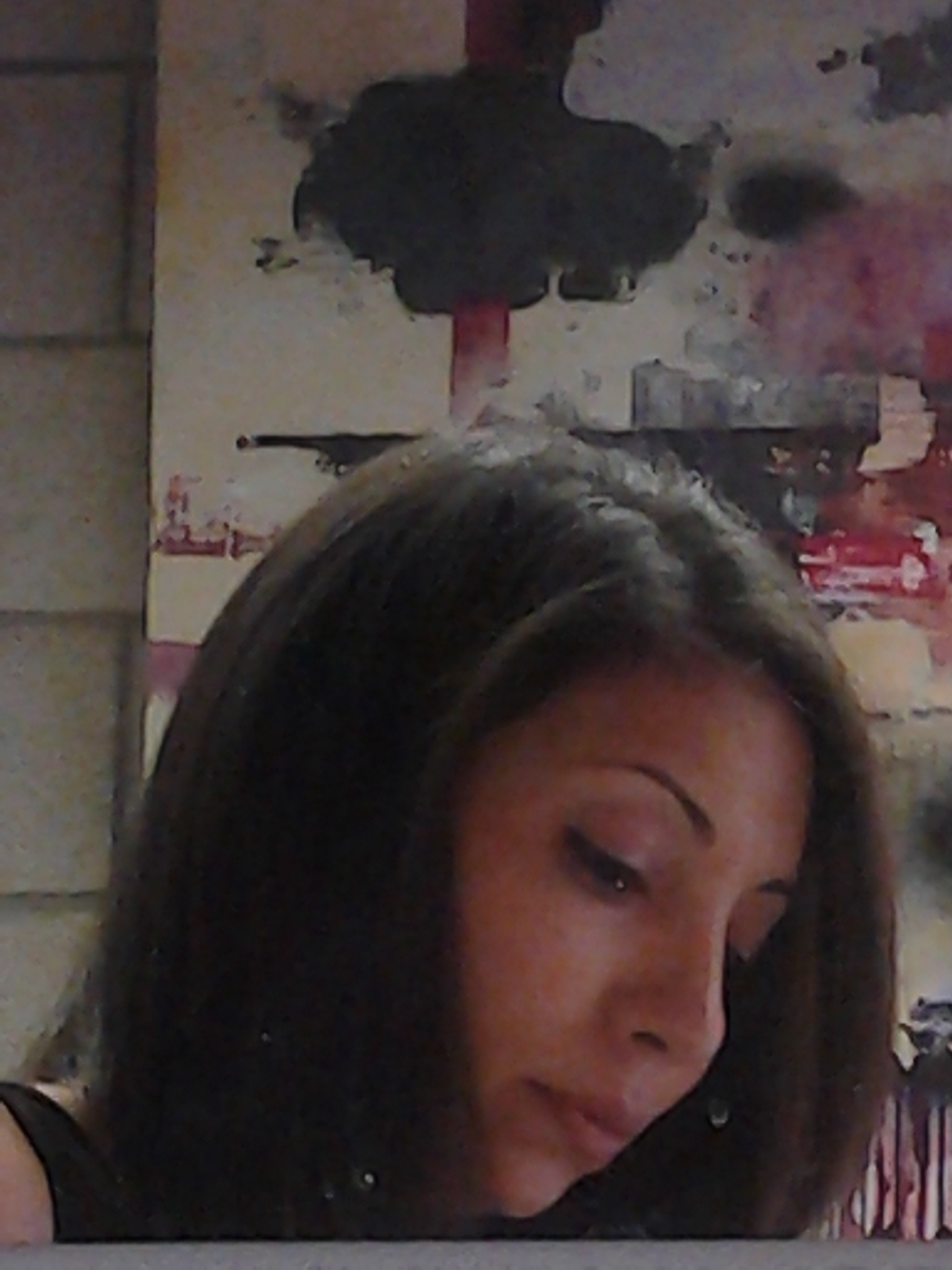
- Born: Reem Samir Bassous; July 19, 1978 (age 47); Beirut, Lebanon
- Other names: Reem Miriam Bassous
- Citizenship: American
- Occupation: Artist
- Known for: Making art, teaching

Reem Miriam Bassous is a Lebanese artist. She was born on July 19, 1978; she was raised in Athens, Greece until she was four years old due to conflict in Lebanon. She moved back to Lebanon later that year. At the age of seventeen, Reem attended the Lebanese American University in Beirut, Lebanon, and at the age of 21 she attended George Washington University in Washington, D.C. There she earned her master's degree in painting and drawing. She moved to Hawaii in 2006, and became a lecturer at the University of Hawaii.

Much of the artist's work deals with her memories of the Lebanese Civil War and its aftereffects. Memory for Forgetfulness, in the collection of the Honolulu Museum of Art, shows the destruction caused by this conflict.

== Solo exhibitions ==
- 2019. "Endless Red", Aupuni Space, Honolulu, HI
- 2016 "Prey/Pray", SBCAST Gallery, Santa Barbara, CA
- 2015 Beyond the Archive, Honolulu Museum of Art; Honolulu, HI
- 2013 Green Line, The Washington Studio School Gallery, Washington DC
- 2010 Plexus, Hawaii Pacific University, Honolulu, HI
- 2010 My Revolution Begins, The Contemporary Museum Café, Honolulu, HI
- 2005 Creative Destruction, RamsayOng Gallery, Kuala Lumpur, Malaysia

== Collaborative projects/ exhibitions ==
- 2019 Artifacts of Place, Stand4 Gallery, Brooklyn, NY
- 2016 FOUR: Reem Bassous, Pratisha Budhiraja, Deborah Nehmad, Yida Wang. Koa Gallery, Honolulu, HI
- 2012 Negotiating Dystopia, Reem Bassous and Maya Portner, Honolulu Museum School of Art, Honolulu, HI
- 2012 Hybrid Herd, Reem Bassous and Maya Portner, Thirtyninehotel, Honolulu, HI
- 2007 Portraits by Reem Bassous and Meg Harders, Focus Gallery at Meadows Museum, Shreveport, LA
- 2002 Calm and Chaos, Work by Reem Bassous and Jodie Biggers, Dimock Gallery, The George Washington University, Washington, DC

== Grants/awards ==
- 2013 The Kafiye Project Competition Winner, Kaflab Foundation, New York, NY
- 2011 The John Young Award, Artists of Hawaii Exhibition, Honolulu, HI
- 2002 The Langenkamp Award for Abstract Painting, Annual Awards Show, The George Washington University, Washington, DC
- 2001 The Glassman Award, Annual Awards Show, The George Washington University, Washington, DC
