= Mohsen al-Sukkari =

Egyptian police officer

Mohsen al-Sukkari (Arabic: محسن السكري), is an Egyptian former police officer who, on 28 July 2008 murdered the well-known Lebanese artist Suzanne Tamim in Dubai, UAE on orders of Egyptian business tycoon and member of the Egyptian Parliament Hisham Talaat Moustafa in return for $2 million paid by Moustafa, according to statements made by the murderer to the investigators in Cairo.

Consequently, the parliamentary immunity was dropped from Mr. Moustafa and he was arrested and charged. Both Al-Sukkari and Moustafa were tried for the murder. On 21 May 2009, Al-Sukkari was consequently found guilty for pre-meditated murder. Moustafa on the other hand was found guilty of involvement in the murder through "incitement, agreement and assistance.".

On 25 June 2008, the Cairo court sentenced both Al Sukkari and Moustafa to death by hanging. Egypt's Grand Mufti Sheikh Ali Goma'a upheld the verdict: "The court found no reason to have mercy on the defendants and decided to execute them unanimously."

An appeal was filed the day before the 25 August 2008 deadline and a hearing was held on 4 February 2010, and the case was postponed to 4 March 2010. Mohsen al-Sukkari was sentenced to 25 years imprisonment for the murder of Suzanne Tamim. According to a judicial source Mr Sukkari was also sentenced to three extra years in jail for possession of an illegal weapon.

On 22 May 2020, he was released from prison, after receiving a pardon from President Abdel Fattah el-Sisi.
