= Fi Shouq =

Studio album by Layal Abboud
- Released: November 27, 2008
- Genre: pop
- Language: Lebanese Arabic
- Label: Aya Production
- Director: Jad Sawaya

Layal Abboud chronology
Fi Shouq (2007–08)	Ma Ba'eesh (2010)

Singles from Fi Shouq
- 1. "Mashghoul Bali 3leik" 2. "A'm Bihlamak"; 3. "Fi Shoo"; 4. "Abouya Alli"; 5. "Tshobi"; 6. "Albi Yamma"; 7. "Hawasy Kella"; 8. "Winni Ya Winn"

Fi Shouq (Arabic: في شوق, Lebanese Arabic pronunciation: [fi ˈʃuːɡ, fi ˈʃuːʔ]; 'On Longing'), also romanized Fi Shoo' or Fi Shou', is the debut studio album by Layal Abboud, started recording on October 13, 2007, and released on November 27, 2008. In April 2008, she performed this album in a concert in Amman, Jordan for the first time. The album has a variety of styles. Her first single, Hawasi Kella, included a featuring with Ihsan al-Mounzer, who arranged Mashghoul Bali Alaik.

== Tracklist ==
1. "Fi Shouq"
2. "Hawasi Kella"
3. "Abouya Alli"
4. "Mashghoul Bali Alaik"
5. "Am Behlamak"
6. "Wen Ya Wen"
7. "Chobi"
8. "Albi Yomma"
