= Sport in Iraq =

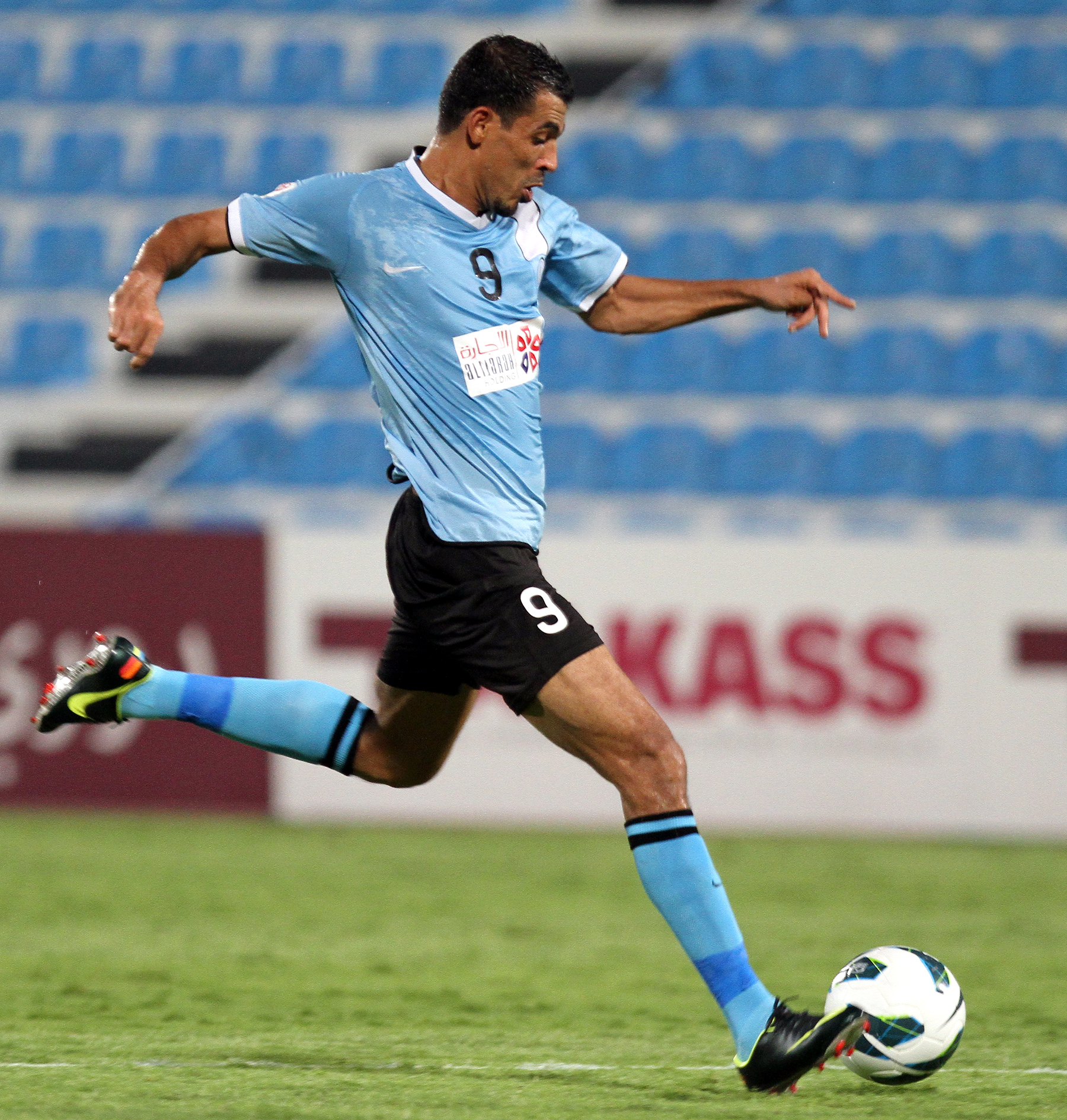
Younis Mahmoud is Iraq's all-time most capped player in international matches, having played in 148 official games.

There are a wide variety of sports played and followed in Iraq. Football is the most popular sport and hobby in Iraq. Football is a considerable uniting factor, following years of war and unrest. Basketball, swimming, weightlifting, bodybuilding, taekwondo, boxing, kickboxing, ultimate frisbee and tennis are also popular sports and hobbies.

== Background ==
Sport was only recently popular in Iraq and this was the case due to the Baath regime, which assumed power in 1968. It was primarily focused on establishing its authority by forcing society to adopt its ideology and sports did not reflect this radical orientation. In the latter part of the 1970s, however, sports began to attract attention. Due to an increasing wealth brought in by the uptick in oil prices, sports facilities have been built in different parts of the country. Particularly, football flourished after domestic football was launched and the country also hosted international competitions, drawing the participation of international football clubs. The popularity of the sport did not dampen the Iraqi enthusiasm even during the outbreak of the Iran-Iraq War in the 1980s when young Iraqis had to serve the armed forces. The field of sports did suffer during Saddam Hussein's regime, when many athletes fled the country due to reports of abuse and torture, particularly by his son, Uday Hussein.

Recent developments in the sports field have been positive for Iraq especially football and basketball. These attract strong following, with fans crowding stadiums in cities like Baghdad.

== Sports ==
=== Football ===
Football is the most popular sport in Iraq. Today, it is not uncommon to find many Iraqi villages having their own football teams. The Iraq national football team were the 2007 AFC Asian Cup champions after defeating Saudi Arabia in the final, held in Jakarta, Indonesia. In 2006, Iraq reached the football final of the 2006 Asian Games in Doha, Qatar, after defeating South Korea and eventually finished as runners-up, winning silver. The football tournament at the 2004 Summer Olympics in Athens, Greece, saw Iraq finish in fourth place, with Italy claiming bronze from a single goal.

The Iraq Football Association is the governing body of football in Iraq, controlling the Iraq national football team and the Iraq Stars League. It was founded in 1948, and has been a member of FIFA since 1950, and the Asian Football Confederation since 1971.

Some of Iraq's top clubs include Al-Shorta, Al-Quwa Al-Jawiya, Al-Zawraa, Erbil SC, Duhok SC, Al Talaba and Najaf FC. While most athletes in Iraq are men, the country has already opened to female playing soccer, basketball, and volleyball. Recently, for instance, Iraq fielded its first national women's soccer team.

Ultimate Frisbee

Ultimate Frisbee is emerging as a popular sport in the Kurdistan region of Iraq with established communities in Erbil, Duhok, Sulaymaniyah, and Mosul. As a self-refereed sport that encourages spirit of the game and incorporates both genders, ultimate frisbee is gaining a reputation as not only a sport contributing to physical health and wellness, but overall community and personal development.

Tournaments have been held in several cities across the Kurdistan Region and on December 13, 2024, the largest Ultimate Frisbee game in Middle Eastern history was held during the Discmas event in Erbil, Iraq, resulting in Team Santa winning with 125 points over Team Elves with 113 points. The game incorporated over forty players and lasted more than five hours.

=== Basketball ===
Basketball is a popular sport in Iraq. There are at least two leagues, the Iraq Basketball Association, the country's professional organization, runs a number of adult and youth leagues, and the Iraqi Premier League, for elite players.

=== Kickboxing ===
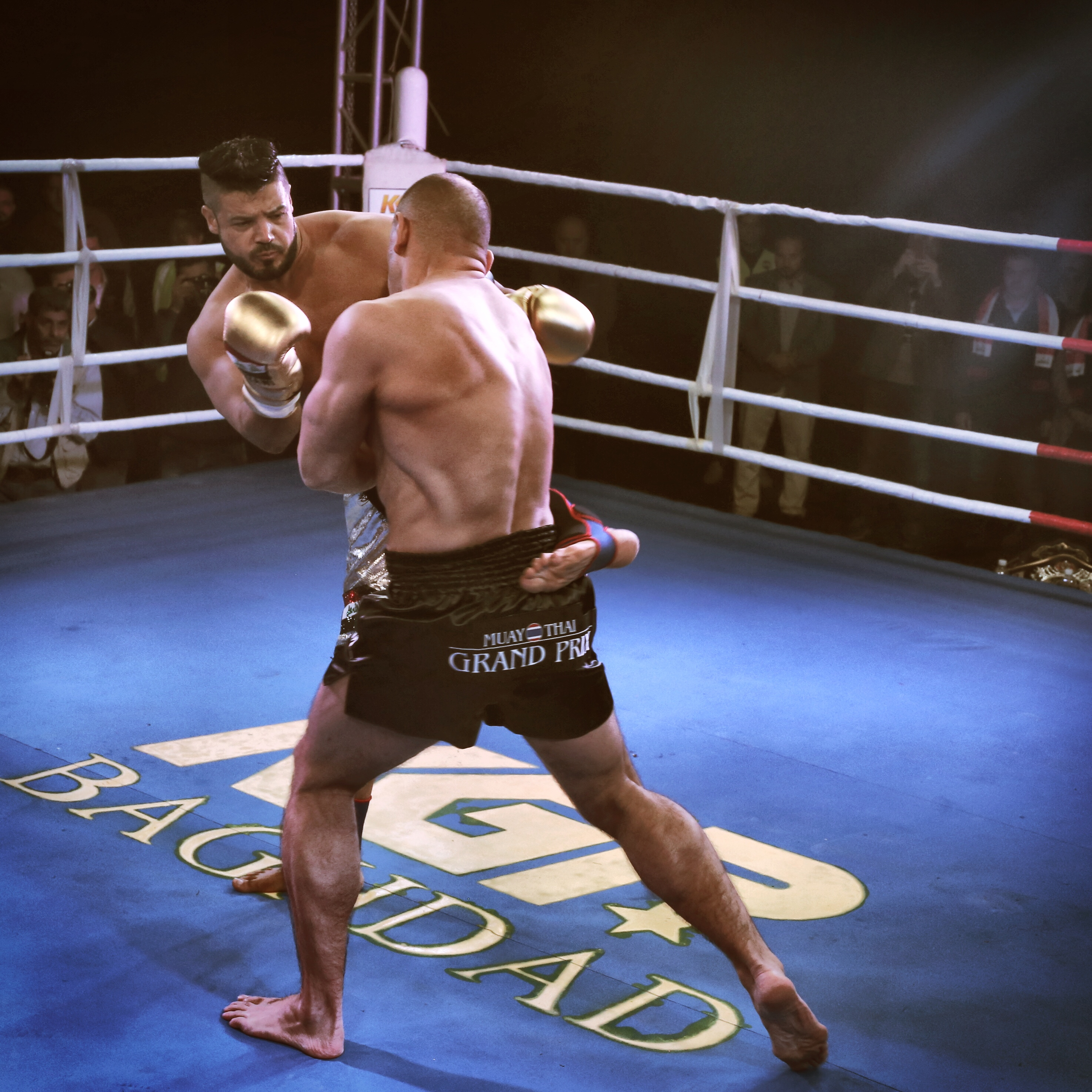
Al-Azzawi fighting for his seventh world heavyweight kickboxing title in his hometown of Baghdad, Iraq.

Riyadh Al-Azzawi is an Iraqi undefeated professional kickboxer who became the 2008 World Kickboxing Network (WKN) World Champion.

=== Wrestling ===
Iraqi professional wrestler Adnan Al-Kaissie is known as General Adnan.

=== Table Tennis ===
On 7 September 2024, Najlah Imad, an Iraqi Paralympic won gold in Table Tennis at the Paris 2024 Paralympic Games, becoming Iraq’s first female Paralympic gold medalist. She was listed in the 2024 edition of Forbes Middle East 30 under 30 list of Sports and Entertainment personalities.

== See also ==
- Iraq at the Olympics
