= Suzanne Alaywan =

Lebanese-Iraqi poet and painter (born 1974)

Suzanne Alaywan (born 1974) is a Lebanese-Iraqi poet and painter. She has admitted to Joan Miró as being inspiration to her work, in addition to Japanese art. She writes predominantly in Arabic.

== Personal life ==
Born in Beirut to an Iraqi father and Lebanese mother. Due to the Lebanese civil war, Alaywan spent her adolescent years between Andalus, Paris, and Cairo. She attended the American School of Paris, graduating in 1992. In 1997 she graduated from the faculty of Journalism and Media in the American University of Cairo.

== Publications ==
Since 1994, Alaywan has published nine collections of poetry, several of which have been translated.

- Café Bird (1994)
- Angels’ Hideout (1995)
- Unique (1996)
- Temporary Sun (1998)
- No Way Out (1999)
- Provisional Sun (2000)
- A Presence Called Love (2001)
- Blind Lantern (2002)
- Envisioning the Scene (2004)
- Junk Words (2006). This has also been translated as "A Clutter of Words".
- All Roads Lead to Salah Salem (2008). (Arabic language, has not been translated)
- The Gazelle`s Throw (2011)

Her works have been included in poetry collections and other collected volumes.

- A poem titled "About Fear" appeared in Issue 14 of A Gathering of the Tribes (2013), a publication focused on art and culture from a diverse perspective.
- Three poems titled "Montmartre", "Draft of a City", and "Degree Zero of the Desert" appeared in the winter 2013 issue of ArteEast Shadehat called City of Translation.
- Her work appeared in Diván de poetisas árabes contemporáneas (Divan of Contemporary Arab Women Poets) (2016), a spanish language book which highlights the importance of poetic history beginning in the mid-20th century. The volume includes work by ten women poets including Alaywan.
- A poem titled " A House made of Sugar" appeared in Lisan, a German-language publication focused on Arabic poetry and fiction in translation.
- Three poems from her collection "A Clutter of Words" were published in Transference Vol. 5 (2017), an academic journal that focuses exclusively on poetic translations.
