= Hisham Talaat Moustafa =

Egyptian businessman (born 1959)

- Born: December 9, 1959 (age 66); Alexandria, Egypt
- Occupation: Businessman
- Political party: National Democratic Party (until 2011)
- Spouse: Hala Abdullah (m. 2008)
- Children: 3
- Parent(s): Talaat Moustafa; Amal Mokhtar
- Status: Presidential pardon
- Conviction: Murder
- Penalty: 15 years' imprisonment (served 9 years)

Hesham Talaat Moustafa (Arabic: هشام طلعت مصطفى; born December 9, 1959) is an Egyptian real estate businessman, and former chairman and current head of the real estate branch of the Talaat Moustafa Group. He had been elected in 2004 to the Shura Council.

In 2007, his net worth was estimated at US$800 million, with multiple Credit Suisse accounts per Suisse secrets, even after he was arrested in September 2008 and found guilty in May 2009 in the murder of Lebanese singer Suzanne Tamim. His sentence to death by hanging was overturned on a legal technicality. Following a retrial in 2010, he was sentenced to 15 years' imprisonment. Moustafa was released after nine years in June 2017 after receiving a presidential pardon and returned as chief executive and managing director of Talaat Moustafa Group.

== Early life and education ==
Born in the Egyptian city of Alexandria in 1959, Moustafa graduated in 1980 from the University of Alexandria's College of Commerce with an accounting degree. He is the youngest son of construction magnate Talaat Moustafa and is married with three children (in order of birth): Omar, Tarek, and Mohamed.

== Career ==
As the Chief Executive of Talaat Moustafa Group, Moustafa spearheaded a significant expansion of the real estate side of the business, including the development of major city El Rehab and the development Madinaty, as well as luxury hotels including the Four Seasons Nile Plaza, Kempinski Nile Hotel Garden City, Four Seasons San Stefano, and Four Seasons Sharm El Sheikh, the largest resort of the Four Seasons brand in the world. In 2004 he was elected to the Shura Council.

On January 17, 2021, Moustafa's real estate company announced its largest development to date, Egypt's first green-smart city, Noor. Located within the Capital Gardens City, a mixed-use city adjacent to the new administrative capital for $32 billion.

== Arrest and trial ==
On September 2, 2008, Moustafa was charged in Cairo of arranging the murder of Lebanese singer Suzanne Tamim. Moustafa was stripped of his parliamentary immunity.

On May 21, 2009, Moustafa was found guilty of involvement in the murder through "incitement, agreement and assistance." On June 25, he was sentenced to death by hanging, along with former police officer Mohsen al-Sukkari, who was allegedly paid $2 million to carry out the hit. Egypt's Grand Mufti Sheikh Ali Goma'a upheld the verdict. An appeal was subsequently filed. Multiple Credit Suisse accounts remained open per Suisse secrets even after his conviction.

=== Retrial ===
On March 4, 2010, the Cassation Court of Egypt accepted an appeal for a new trial after concluding the original verdict had made mistakes of legal technicality. The defense argued that co-defendant Al-Sukkari was not properly represented during his first questioning. The retrial began on April 26. On May 28, Tamim's family dropped its civil suit against Moustafa and denied that they were paid a settlement. On September 25, prosecutors spent two hours delivering final retrial statements, arguing that they had evidence from 39 witnesses and mobile phone messages. On September 28, 2010, the court re-sentenced Moustafa to a reduced penalty of 15 years' imprisonment.

=== Assault investigation ===
In August 2010, Egyptian police opened an investigation of allegations that Moustafa had beaten his brother-in-law Ihab Mohamed Madi during the first week of Ramadan. Madi claimed that the beating began after he tried to intervene in an argument between his wife Sahar and Moustafa. Sahar, who is also Moustafa's sister, has been noted as the only member of Moustafa's family to consistently attend his court hearings. In June 2017, Moustafa, along with 501 other prisoners, was released after receiving a presidential pardon.
