= Talaat Moustafa Group =

Egyptian conglomerate

Talaat Mostafa Group Holding Co S.A.E. (مجموعة طلعت مصطفى القابضة (ش.م.م
- Trade name: Talaat Moustafa Group Holding
- Native name: مجموعة طلعت مصطفى القابضة
- Type: Société Anonyme Égyptienne
- Traded as: EGX: TMGH; EGX 30 Component
- ISIN: EGS691S1C011
- Industry: Real Estate, Hospitality, Construction, Utilities, Facility Management, Transportation, Financial Services
- Founded: 2007
- Founder: Hisham Talaat Moustafa
- Headquarters: Cairo, Egypt
- Area served: Egypt, Saudi Arabia, Oman, Iraq
- Key people: Tarek Talaat Moustafa (Executive Chairman); Hisham Talaat Mostafa (CEO); Hany Talaat Mostafa (Executive Member)
- Products: Al Rehab City; Madinaty City; The Spine (Under Construction); Noor City (Under Construction); Southmed (Under Construction); Sharm Bay (Under Construction); Banan (Under Construction); Yamal (Under Construction); Jood (Under Construction); Privado; Celia; Four Seasons Luxor (Under Construction); Four Seasons Cairo Capital at Madinaty (Under Construction); Four Seasons at the Pyramids (Under Construction); Four Seasons Nile Plaza; San Stefano Grand Plaza; Four Seasons Sharm El Sheikh; Kempinski Nile Hotel Garden City Cairo; Sofitel Legend Old Cataract Aswan; Marriott Omar Khayyam Zamalek; Marriott Mena House Cairo; Sofitel Winter Palace Luxor; Mövenpick Resort Aswan; Steigenberger Hotel Tahrir Cairo; Steigenberger Cecil Hotel Alexandria; Al Rabwa El Sheikh Zayed; May Fair Al Sherouk City; Virginia Beach; Al Rawda El Khadraa El Agamy
- Revenue: ▲ E£62.495 billion (2025)
- Operating income: ▲ E£18.374 billion (2025)
- Net income: ▲ E£14.383 billion (2025)
- Total assets: ▲ E£436.222 billion (2025)
- Total equity: ▲ E£157.708 billion (2025)
- Owner: Talaat Moustafa family
- Number of employees: 100,000+ (2024)
- Website: talaatmoustafa.com

Talaat Moustafa Group Holding SAE (TMGH), is an Egyptian multinational real estate development company. It is the largest listed real estate development company in Egypt. Founded in 2007 as a holding company of pre-existing companies, some of which were founded in the 1970s by the late Talaat Moustafa, and publicly listed on the Egyptian Exchange in 2007.

The group is known for the development of large gated communities, as well as a chain of hotels, where it is one of the top ten listed real estate developers in Egypt in terms of profits, as well as land, holding over 100,000 acres in Greater Cairo, the largest of any developer by far. Currently, TMG Holding is listed as number 8 in Forbes' Top 50 Listed Companies in Egypt 2023. TMG Holding is the number 1 company in Egypt in terms of sales, exceeding 500 billion Egyptian pounds in 2024.

== Ownership ==
As of December 2021, the Talaat Moustafa Group’s largest shareholder at 43% was TMG for Real Estate and Touristic Investments SAE, a company jointly held by the Talaat Moustafa Family (Tarek, Hani and Hisham Talaat Moustafa). With stakes through another company (Alexandria Construction Company SAE) brothers Tarek, Hisham and Hany ultimately own 34% of TMGH’s stock. Hisham Talaat Moustafa has been group CEO since 2017 till present, and had previously held that position until 2008. He has also served as a member of the Shura Council (Upper House). Brother Tarek Talaat Moustafa is group Chairman since 2008 and a former member of parliament.

The remaining identifiable owners are Abdelmoniem Alrashed, owning 7% of the group through the UAE based company, Rimco EGT Investment LLC. The rest are mostly investment funds, led by the Norges Bank who owned 3.3% of TMGH’s shares in 2021.

== Projects ==
=== Cities and communities ===
TMG is behind some of Egypt's largest community developments, including the New Cairo cities of Madinaty, El Rehab, Celia, and the recently launched, Noor. Other developments include May Fair in El Sherouq City, El Rabwa in Sheikh Zayed City, Virginia Beach in the North Coast of Alexandria, and El Radwa El Khadraa in El Agamy. In all, TMG boasts a population of over 1 million residents across its projects, ranking it the highest in the world for a private developer.

=== Hotels and resorts ===
TMG's hospitality endeavors include Four Seasons Nile Plaza, Four Seasons Sharm El Sheikh, Four Seasons San Stefano, and Kempinski Nile Hotel.

Following an announcement in 2017 for the expansion of the Four Seasons Sharm El Sheikh, upon completion, the hotel will be the largest Four Seasons Resort in the world.

In 2016, TMG announced plans to build a Four Seasons hotel in its New Cairo property Madinaty, part of an 8,000 acres (3,200 ha) development and expansion in New Cairo. Plans to build a Four Seasons hotel in Luxor were made in 2008 but put on hold in the wake of the Egyptian Revolution. In 2020, TMG announced plans to continue the project in Luxor, providing financing of E£1.5 billion to complete a 200-room Four Seasons in the historic city.
