= Syndicate of Professional Artists in Lebanon =

- Syndicate of Professional Artists in Lebanon
- نقابة الفنانين المحترفين في لبنان
- Founded: 28 June 1993; 32 years ago
- Headquarters: Badaro, Beirut
- Members: 810 (as of March 2017)
- Affiliations: Syndicate
- Website: www.cmuda.org

Syndicate of Professional Artists in Lebanon (Arabic: نقابة الفنانين المحترفين في لبنان:[niqābat ul-Fan'nanin al-Moħtarafin fi Loubnan]) was established on 28 June 1993 and includes persons who hold the following professions:

- Acting
- Music : Songwriters, Composers, Instrumentalists and Singers.
- Film directing: Theatrical, Film, TV and broadcasting
- Writing: Playwright, Cinema, TV, broadcasting and Song poets
- Dancing : Classical ballet, Contemporary dance, Ballroom, Latin and Partner dance.
- Cinematography: Decorative arts, Illumination, Theatre Fashion design
- Theater, film, radio and television technicians: Director of photography, Engineer, Sound, Photographer, Writer, Director of Technical Production, Assistant director.
