= Laura Daccache =

Lebanese singer and actor (1917–2005)

Laura or Laure Daccache (Arabic: لور دكاش, romanized: Lūr Dakkāsh; 24 March 1917 – 12 October 2005) was a Lebanese actor and singer. Her name has been transliterated in forms including Laure Dackache, Laure Dakkache, and Lour Dkash.

== Early life ==
Daccache was born on 24 March 1917 in Lebanon. Her father, who worked in textiles, wrote poetry, and her mother sang and played the lute. She sang from an early age and made a recording with the Beydaphon company in 1931.

== Career ==
She spent much of her life in Egypt, playing the lute and writing songs for Egyptian radio. She took part in the Egyptian film The Musician in 1946, and also had a small role in the 1994 comedy film Get Rich or Get Enamored.

Her 1933 album Dawn was promoted to expatriate Arabs in Brazil with the sales line: "Do you want to go back to those beautiful mornings you spent in your village? ... Listen and close your eyes, feeling the morning breeze."

Her performance of "A Ward" featured on the 2015 album Nostalgique Égypte : chansons d'amour, de charme et improvisations 1925 – 1960, listed as Laure Dakkache.

In 1996 she released an album L'âge d'or du chant arabe [The Golden Age of Arab Song].

== Death ==
Daccache died on 12 October 2005 in Cairo, Egypt.
