= Dolly Shahine =

Lebanese singer, actress, and designer

- دوللي شاهين
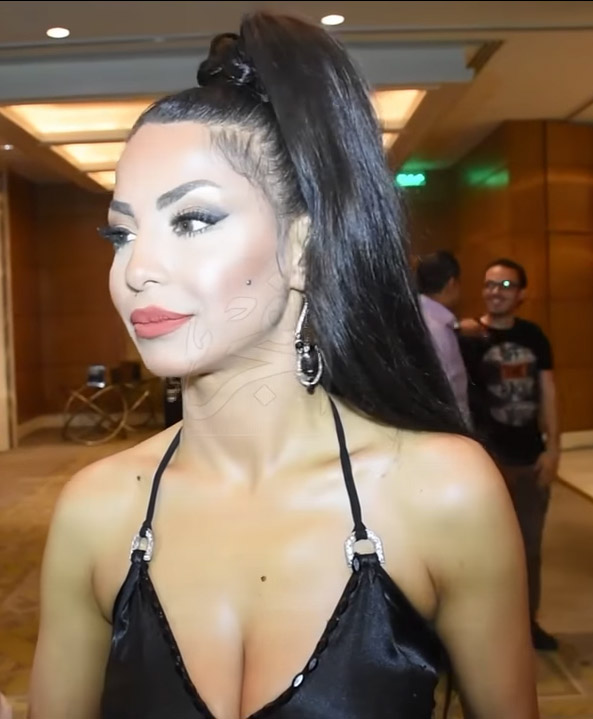
- Born: Dolly Joseph Abou Shahine دوللي جوزيف أبو شاهين; July 2, 1980 (age 46); Bmahray, Aley District, Lebanon
- Occupations: Actress, singer, model, fashion designer
- Years active: 2005–present
- Spouses: Sami Qalib (m. 2001; div. 2009) Bakhos Alwan (m. 2009; div. 2014)
- Children: 1

Dolly Abou Shahine (Arabic: دوللي أبو شاهين, born July 2, 1980) or simply Dolly Shahine, is a Lebanese singer, actress, and fashion designer.

== Biography ==
Dolly Shahine was born in Aley District to a Brazilian father and a Lebanese mother, and raised Catholic. She was named after the American country singer Dolly Parton. She studied journalism for one year in Lebanon, before she went to London to study music theory for five years.

== Personal life ==
In 2001, Dolly Shahine married Lebanese model Sami Qalib. They officially divorced in 2009. In late 2009, she married Lebanese director Bakhos Alwan. They have a daughter named Nour. Shahine announced in 2014 that she and Alwan were divorcing, and the couple had officially separated due to irreconcilable differences. They stayed on good terms.

== Discography ==
=== Albums ===
- Wala Kol El Banat (2009)
- Cinderella (2017)

=== Singles and music videos ===
Year	Title	Album	Video Clip Director	Language/Dialect
2005	Momo Einy	N/A	Mark Abi Rached	Lebanese/Moroccan Arabic
2006	Ana Zay Ay Bent	N/A	Khalid Youssef	Egyptian Arabic
2006	Dawebny Fik	N/A	Khalid Youssef	Egyptian Arabic
2006	Gher Kol El Banat	Wala Kol El Banat	Mohamed Saeid	Egyptian Arabic
2007	Ayezny Alok	N/A	Mark Abi Rached	Egyptian Arabic
2007	Nazra Wahda	Wala Kol El Banat	Oliver Ojiel	Lebanese Arabic
2008	Ana Geit	N/A	Jad Sawaya	Egyptian Arabic
2009	Gedid Alaya	Wala Kol El Banat	Bakhos Alwan	Egyptian Arabic
2014	Sana Saeeda	N/A	Bakhos Alwan	Egyptian Arabic
2017	Nazarato	Cinderella	Bakhos Alwan	Egyptian Arabic
2018	Law Aal Foraa	Cinderella	Bakhos Alwan	Egyptian Arabic
2018	Habeebi Gheir	N/A	Dolly Shahine	Gulf Arabic

== Filmography ==
=== Film ===
- Weja (2006)
- Khames Njoom (2007)
- Al Shayateen (2007)
- Nems Bond (2008)
- El Mesh Muhandes Hassan (2008)
- Bidoun Riqaba (2009)
- Tita Rahiba (2012)
- Tatah (2013)
- Zarf Sehi (2014)

=== TV series ===
- Adham El Sharkawy (2008)
- Sharif wa Noss (2009)
- El Morafa'a (2015)
