= Arts, Sciences and Technology University in Lebanon =

University located in Lebanon

Coordinates: 33.87720°N 35.49623°E

Arts, Sciences and Technology University in Lebanon (AUL)
- Type: Private
- Established: 1998; 28 years ago
- President: Prof. Bassam Al Hajjar
- Students: 8000
- Location: Beirut, Lebanon
- Campus: Cola, Beirut.
- Website: www.aul.edu.lb/

Arts, Sciences and Technology University in Lebanon (AUL), is an independent and nondenominational Lebanese higher education institution with undergraduate and graduate degree programs.

The main campus of the university is in Cola, Beirut. AUL has a branch in Jadra, south of Beirut and five study centers in Tripoli - North Lebanon, Jounieh, Dekwaneh and Chtoura.

== History ==
AUL started under the name of “Business and Computer University College” (BCU) with two faculties but later expanded by adding the faculty of Arts and Humanities to the Business Administration, and Sciences and Fine Arts faculties thus gaining the university status and changed its name to meet the expansion of its major offerings.

In 2007, BCU changed to become Arts, Sciences and Technology University in Lebanon (AUL); including 4 major faculties:

- Faculty of Business Administration.
- Faculty of Sciences and Fine Arts.
- Faculty of Arts and Humanities.
- Faculty of Engineering.

== Accreditation and Recognitions ==
AUL is accredited by the Lebanese Ministry of Higher Education (2000) (MHE). That accreditation includes undergraduate and graduate levels.

AUL is a member of the European Council for Business Education (ECBE), Arab Organization for Admission & registration of universities in Arab Nation (ACRAO), International Council for Hotels, Restaurants & Institutional Education, and the Association of Collegiate Business Schools and Programs.

AUL Jadra Campus offers the American University for Humanities Degree Programs. An autonomous Program of Liberal Education within the university's global network. The program is fully accredited by the American Academy for Liberal Education (AALE), a national accrediting agency recognized by the United States Secretary of Education.

== Faculties ==
=== Faculty of Business Administration ===
- B.A. in Accounting
- B.A. in Banking and Finance
- B.A. in Management
- B.A. in Management Information Systems
- B.A. in Marketing and Advertising
- B.A. in Hospitality Management
- B.A. in Events Management
- B.A. in Travel & Tourism Management
- B.A. in Human Resources
- Master of Business Administration (MBA)
- Masters of Executive Business Administration (EMBA)

=== Faculty of Sciences & Fine Arts ===
The Faculty of Sciences and Fine Arts houses 12 academic departments and programs in three separate divisions:

The Division of Computer Science with the following departments:

- BS. Computer Science.
- MS. Master of Science in Computer Science & Communication.

The Division of Fine Arts with the following departments:

- BS. Graphic Design
- BS. Interior Design

The Division of Basic Sciences with the following departments:

- BS. Mathematics

=== Faculty of Arts & Humanities ===
- B.A. in Anthropology
- B.A. in Arabic Literature
- B.A. in Communication Arts
- B.A. in English Literature
- B.A. in Performance Arts
- B.A. in Religious Studies
- B.A. in Sociology
- Teaching Diploma

=== Faculty of Engineering ===
- B.S. in Mechatronics Engineering
- B.S. in Mechanical Engineering
- B.S. in Computer and Communication Engineering
- Master of Computer and Communication Engineering
