= Suzanne Tamim =

Lebanese singer

- سوزان تميم
- Born: Suzanne Abdel Sattar Tamim سوزان عبد الستار تميم; September 23, 1977; Beirut, Lebanon
- Died: July 28, 2008 (aged 30); Dubai, United Arab Emirates
- Cause of death: Murder
- Occupation: Singer
- Spouse(s): Ali Muzannar (divorced) Adel Matouk

Suzanne Tamim (Arabic: سوزان تميم, September 23, 1977 – July 28, 2008) was a Lebanese singer who rose to fame in the Arab world after winning the top prize in the popular Studio El Fan television show in 1996. She was murdered in Dubai in July 2008.

== Biography ==
Tamim's career was marred by rumours of a troubled private life. Her first husband was Ali Muzannar. She remarried to a Lebanese impresario and producer Adel Matouk, who became her manager.

== Musical career ==
She won a gold medal on Studio El Fan. Tamim's last album was produced in 2002 by Rotana and called Saken Alby. It went on to establish sales records. Her last song, "Lovers", recorded in 2006, was dedicated to the memory of slain Lebanese Prime Minister Rafik Hariri.

== Death ==
Suzanne Tamim was found murdered in her apartment in Dubai on July 28, 2008. Although it was reported that she had been beheaded, the lawyer of her former husband revealed that her death certificate indicates her throat was slit. At the time of her death, she had reportedly been married to Iraqi-born British kickboxing champion Riyadh Al-Azzawi for about 18 months.

== Murder trials ==
On September 2, 2008, prominent Egyptian businessman and lawmaker in the Shura Council, Hisham Talaat Moustafa was arrested in Cairo. The son of Egyptian conglomerate tycoon Talaat Mostafa, Hisham Moustafa was charged with paying a hitman, Mohsen al-Sukkari, to have Tamim killed. On May 21, 2009, Moustafa and al-Sukkari were found guilty of Tamim's murder and sentenced to death by hanging in Cairo. An Egyptian court confirmed their sentences on June 25, 2009. However, on March 4, 2010, the Supreme Constitutional Court of Egypt threw out the convictions and sentences against the two convicts and ordered their retrial on a legal technicality. After the retrial, Moustafa was sentenced to 15 years. His co-defendant, al-Sukkari, had his sentence reduced to life in prison.

Al-Sukkari, the alleged hitman, was a 39-year-old former policeman from Egypt. He was arrested as the alleged murderer in early August in Cairo. Al-Sukkari, whose name was being withheld, was said to have died in police custody soon after his arrest; however, the police subsequently produced him publicly. The alleged killer—who had apparently confessed to the murder—denied any connection to her death. Al-Sukkari was subsequently indicted, along with Moustafa, on charges of murder and for allegedly receiving $2 million from Moustafa for the killing. On May 23, 2020 Egypt's president Abdel Fattah el-Sisi pardoned thousands of prisoners including Al-Sukkari, according to the official gazette, on the occasion of Eid al-Fitr holiday marking end of Muslim fasting month of Ramadan.

Although Egyptian newspapers initially reported freely about the death, once the case was linked to the businessman the Attorney General's office forbade reporting about the case. An edition of a newspaper that defied the order was confiscated. Five Egyptian journalists were also charged with breaching the gag order during the trial.

== In fiction ==
Her murder inspired the Swedish noir film The Nile Hilton Incident.

== See also ==
- Dhahi Khalfan Tamim
