= Legal technicality =

Colloquial phrase referring to a technical aspect of law

The term legal technicality is a casual or colloquial phrase referring to a technical aspect of law. The phrase is not a term of art in the law; it has no exact meaning, nor does it have a legal definition. In public perception, it typically refers to "procedural rules that can dictate the outcome of a case without having anything to do with the merits of that case." However, as a vague term, the definition of a technicality varies from person to person, and it is often simply used to denote any portion of the law that interferes with the outcome desired by the user of the term.

Some legal technicalities govern legal procedure, enable or restrict access to courts, and/or enable or limit the discretion of a court in handing down judgment. These are aspects of procedural law. Other legal technicalities deal with aspects of substantive law, that is, aspects of the law that articulate specific criteria that a court uses to assess a party's compliance with or violation of, for example, one or more criminal laws or civil laws. In some cases, people may regard legal protections such as the exclusionary rule as legal technicalities.

In the introduction to A Dictionary of Human Rights, David Robertson states (emphasis in original):

"One cannot dismiss legal technicalities and cut through legal language entirely, because rights basically are legal technicalities. What cannot be expressed with some clarity in a legal document will not be preserved and protected."

In 1928, William W. Brewton wrote that the law is inevitably technical because a relatively small number of laws have to account for a much larger number of possible situations. Since the rules and principles of law are expected to apply to many different cases, they cannot always account for the exact circumstances, which can result in failures of justice in individual cases even when the greatest possible overall justice is being achieved. He said that people mistakenly criticize the technicalities, which are both "necessary and inevitable", when they should focus instead on preventing the original causes of litigation and crime.

Brewton wrote that the rules of procedure are complex because there is no simplified approach that would be sufficient. Furthermore, allowing the rules to be broken (such as abrogating a constitutional right) to better fit a single case would mean that the same rules could be broken in other cases:

Granting that adherence to rules laid down for trials results in occasional insults to common sense, it yet remains that all trials would be absurdities if courts were to...attempt perfectly to suit the details of each case by hazarding a procedure known to guarantee justice in the most cases. We are to admit, then, that courts are not the victims either of a lack of common sense or of a smug judicial temperament when, to preserve order and permanent arrangement in the law, they hand down decisions which appear absurd upon their face. For if one will take the trouble to uncover everything entering into such decisions, usually it will be found that good and important reasons underlie them...It is not the reasonable province of courts to overturn the science of jurisprudence in order that the reasons for their operations may appear as self-evident as those of an ordinary sum in arithmetic, and in order that the reports of their decisions may read like a newspaper story.

== See also ==
- Legal abuse
- Legal fiction
- Letter and spirit of the law
- Loophole
