= Mawazine =

Annual Moroccan music festival

Coordinates: 34°01′31″N 6°50′10″W

- Genre: Diverse World Music; Pop Music
- Locations: Rabat, Morocco
- Years active: 2001–present
- Attendance: ~ 3.75 million
- Organiser: Maroc Cultures
- Website: mawazine.ma

Mawazine (Arabic: موازين, romanized: mawāzīn, meaning "rhythms") is an international music festival held annually in Rabat, Morocco. The event features a wide range of international and local music artists across various genres. Mawazine is organized by Maroc Cultures.

The 2025 festival was attended by 3.75 million people, making Mawazine the largest music festival in the world. With 90 acts on 7 stages, it has the highest ratio of attendees per stage in the world. Mawazine is considered Africa's largest and most important music festival.

== Notable performers ==
Artist	Genre	Year Performed
Mariah Carey	Pop/R&B	2012
Whitney Houston	Pop/R&B	2008
Stevie Wonder	Soul/Funk	2009
Rihanna	Pop/R&B	2013
Shakira	Pop/Latin	2011
Justin Timberlake	Pop/R&B	2014
Jennifer Lopez	Pop/Latin	2015
Alicia Keys	Pop/R&B	2014
Bruno Mars	Pop/Funk	2018
The Weeknd	R&B/Pop	2018
Nicki Minaj	Rap/Pop	2024
Enrique Iglesias	Pop/Latin	2013
Chris Brown	R&B/Pop	2016
Elton John	Pop/Rock	2010
Christina Aguilera	Pop	2016
Kanye West	Rap/Hip-Hop	2011
Karol G	Latin/Reggaeton	2019
Maluma	Latin/Reggaeton	2019
Travis Scott	Rap/Hip-Hop	2019
Camila Cabello	Pop	2024
Ricky Martin	Latin Pop	2015
Wiz Khalifa	Rap/Hip-Hop	2017
Marshmello	EDM	2019
Rosalía	Pop/Flamenco Fusion	2019
Calvin Harris	EDM/Pop	2024
J Balvin	Reggaeton/Latin	2019
Pharrell Williams	Pop/Funk	2015
Rod Stewart	Rock	2017
Usher	R&B/Pop	2015
Demi Lovato	Pop	2017
French Montana	Rap/Hip-Hop	2018
Luis Fonsi	Latin/Pop	2018
Nick Jonas	Pop	2017
Iggy Azalea	Pop/Rap	2016
Ellie Goulding	Pop	2017
Kylie Minogue	Pop	2024
Scorpions	Rock	2012
Future	Rap/Hip-Hop	2019
David Guetta	EDM	2019
DJ Snake	EDM	2017
Akon	R&B/Pop	2015
Pitbull	Rap/Latin Pop	2016
Avicii	EDM	2015
Central Cee	Rap/Drill	2024
Jason Derulo	Pop/R&B	2014
Migos	Rap/Hip-Hop	2019
The Chainsmokers	EDM/Pop	2018
Metro Boomin	Rap/Hip-Hop	2024
Jessie J	Pop	2013
Maroon 5	Pop/Rock	2015
Saad Lamjarred	Moroccan Pop	2015
The Jacksons	Pop/Soul	2013
ATEEZ	K-Pop	2024
aespa	K-Pop	2025
Will Smith	Pop/Rap	2025
50 Cent	Rap/Hip-Hop	2025
Kid Cudi	Rap/Pop	2025

== History ==
The festival has known two eras. The first spanned between 2001 and 2007, when it was dedicated to the music of the world genre. The event had some financial difficulties and was struggling to find sponsors. The second era, which started in 2008, has seen Mounir Majidi, the personal secretary of the Moroccan King, take over the event. During this period, the festival started programming more mainstream music, and has become much stronger financially with many sponsorships from large Moroccan businesses. The press reported that the list of artists performing in the event is validated by Mohammed VI.

=== Funding controversy ===
In Morocco, the funding of the festival has often been the target of criticism. According to critics, the festival has been funded through state-owned companies such as CDG, OCP, ONCF and Royal Air Maroc, money which they deem can be better spent in sectors such as health/education/unemployment. In 2011, the management of Mawazine declared that budget of the festival is around 62 million Dirhams, of which 27 million is provided by sponsors and 35 million from revenues of the event. They added that only 4 million dirham is given by Rabat's city council.

JLEC (Jorf Lasfar Energy Company), a Morocco-based subsidiary of Taqa, appeared in 2010 as a major sponsor of the event on the festival's official website. In January 2011, Peter Barker-Homek, CEO of Taqa between 2006 and October 2009, declared in a letter sent to the Securities Exchange Commission, that he was instructed to donate $5 million/year to Hassan Bouhemou, CEO of SNI (holding company controlled by the Moroccan royal family), the sum was allegedly going to fund the music festival. In the letter Barker states that he was unconvinced of the utility of such donation, and inquired Taqa's Chairman al-Suwaidi about it, the latter stated that in return for the payment Taqa would get the green light to expand its energy plant in the country. JLEC holds a 30 years contract with Morocco's main electricity distributor ONE, and supplies as much as 50% of the country's electricity needs according to its management.

Hassan Bouhemou, denied being involved in any way in the organisation of the festival or its management and Aziz Daki director of the festival declared that the amounts reported by Barker are incorrect. According to Telquel JLEC donated 10 million Dirhams to Mawazine, replacing Emirati firm Maabar as a major sponsor of the event in 2010.

=== 2009 stampede ===
Eleven people were killed and forty were injured in a crowd crush at the "Hay Nahda stadium" during the festival shortly after midnight on 24 May 2009. The incident occurred when spectators attempted to leave in a hurry near the end of a free concert by Moroccan star Abdelaziz Stati. A wire fence collapsed during this attempt, endangering the lives of the 70,000 spectators. The concert had begun at 23:00, later than billed, and this caused people attending other concerts, including one by Stevie Wonder, to go to the stadium when their own concerts were finished.

Eight of the victims were seriously injured. Five of the dead were women, four were men and two were teenagers. They were all discovered after the stampede had completed and found to have been crushed by suffocation. Survivors had to be pulled from the wreckage by rescuers. The dead were all Moroccan. Seven people were still in hospital the following day.

Hassan Amrani, the governor of Rabat at the time, blamed concert-goers for the disaster, saying that they had "decided to go over the metal barriers to have a quick exit". There were 3,000 police on duty at the event. Maroc Cultures issued a statement to express "its great sorrow", extending "its profound and sincere condolences" to those affected by the tragedy. King Mohammed VI also sent the families of those affected messages of condolence and offered to pay for funeral services and hospital costs. Morocco's interior ministry has announced it will investigate the incident.

=== 2024 Return ===
After 3 years stoppage due to the spread of the COVID-19 pandemic, the Maroc Culture Association confirmed the return of the Mawazine festival in 2024 for its 19th edition.

== Editions ==
=== 2008 ===
Mawazine was attended by 1.2 million people and was located in nine venues across Rabat.

The festival featured many artists from around the world, including Whitney Houston, Juanes, Goran Bregovic, George Benson, Hoba Hoba Spirit, Tony Allen and Issac Delgado.

=== 2009 ===
The 2009 festival, a nine-day event entitled "Rhythms of the World", was the eighth edition and began on 15 May, attracting crowds of one million people from cities such as Casablanca, Marrakesh, Fez and Tangiers to Rabat. Admission cost between 100 and 500 dirhams (15 to 70 USD). 1700 performers performed in 2009.

The opening three days featured acts such as Kylie Minogue, Alicia Keys, Stevie Wonder, K'naan, Hoba Hoba Spirit, Cheb Khaled, Najwa Karam, Warda Al-Jazairia, Ali Campbell (formerly of UB40), and Johnny Clegg of White Zulu. Other musical acts to feature include Mali's Amadou & Mariam, Cuban musician Eliades Ochoa, The Joubran Trio, three brothers from Palestine, and Iranian ensemble Eshtiaq.

The festival opened with a concert by Ennio Morricone, accompanied by a Moroccan choir with ninety members, on the Bouregreg stage. This was followed by a Kylie Minogue performance on the OLM Souissi stage. Khaled's concert was attended by 50,000 people, whilst 40,000 and 30,000 attendance figures were registered for Kylie Minogue and Warda respectively. Stevie Wonder closed the festival on 23 May.

Najwa Karam's performance was the first in Morocco; it attracted about 60,000 spectators. Warda Al-Jazairia was granted the "Wissam Royal".

Setlist: Kylie Minogue (15 May 2009)

Act 1: Xlectro Static

- "Speakerphone"
- "Can't Get You Out of My Head" (contains elements of "Blue Monday" along with excerpts from "Boombox")
- "Ruffle My Feathers"
- "In Your Eyes"

Act 2: Cheer Squad

- "Heart Beat Rock" (contains elements of "Mickey")
- "Wow"
- "Shocked" (DNA Mix)

Act 3: Xposed

- "Like a Drug"
- "Slow" (with excerpts of "Free")
- "The One"
- "2 Hearts"

Act 4: Black Versus White

- "On a Night Like This"
- "Kids"
- "Step Back in Time"
- "In My Arms"
- "Love at First Sight" (Ruff and Jam U.S. Remix)

Act 5: Naughty Manga Girl

- "Sometime Samurai" (contains excerpts from "German Bold Italic") (Video Interlude)
- "Come into My World" (Fischerspooner Mix) (contains elements of "Finer Feelings" and "Dreams")
- "Nu-di-ty"
- "Sensitized"

Act 6: Starry Nights

- "Flower" (an unreleased song from X)
- "I Believe in You"
- "Cosmic"

Act 7: Beach Party

- "Loveboat" (contains elements of "The Love Boat Theme Song")
- "Copacabana"
- "That's Why They Write Love Songs" (an unreleased song co-written by Steve Anderson)
- "Spinning Around" (contains elements of "Got to be Real")

Encore

- "No More Rain"
- "All I See"

=== 2010 ===
The ninth edition of Mawazine took place from 21 May to 29 May 2010. Elton John and B.B. King performed at the OLM Souissi stage on 26 and 27 May respectively. Julio Iglesias performed on 23 May. Sting closed the 10-day festival with a performance on Saturday, 29 May 2010. Other performers at the 10-day festival included Mika, Harry Connick Jr., Thievery Corporation, Al Jarreau, Deolinda, Angélique Kidjo and Carlos Santana.

The festival also brought famous Arab singers such as Najwa Karam, Tamer Hosny, Elissa, Wael Jassar, Majida El Roumi, Myriam Fares, Rami Ayach.

The Generation Mawazine competition launches the music career of promising young talent. This artistic competition, which has been run since 2006 as a fringe activity to the festival, sets out to find the talent of tomorrow and offers them a major springboard into the music business. Open to all styles of music, this competition gives the stage to new young talents and is judged along 3 predefined categories: rap/hip hop, fusion/neo pop and electronic music. This initiative gives unknown bands the opportunity to perform in front of the general public and media in a professional setting. The winning groups see their career launched in Morocco, produce an album and perform at the following year's festival as established artists.

=== 2011 ===
The tenth edition was held from 20 May to 28 May 2011 at the OLM Souissi. The show was opened on the Friday with traditional and international performers. Notable performances which followed were Kanye West and Spaniard Ivica pica on the 21st and the English girl group Sugababes on the 22nd. The following days saw legends like Yusuf Islam, Quincy Jones, Joe Cocker and Lionel Richie take on the big stage. The event was again lightened when it had Shakira alongside Swiss DJ and producer Yves Larock on the last day. Shakira's performance has gained over 200,000 audiences

Setlist: Kanye West (20 May 2011)
1. Intro (Contains simples from "H•A•M")
2. Dark Fantasy
3. POWER
4. Jesus Walks
5. Can't Tell Me Nothing
6. Diamonds From Sierra Leone
7. Hell Of A Life
8. Monster
9. Flashing Lights
10. Good Life (Contains simples from "P.Y.T. (Pretty Young Thing)")
11. Love Lockdown
12. Say You Will
13. Heartless
14. Rap medley :
  1. Swagga like Us
  2. Run This Town
  3. E.T.
15. Homecoming
16. Through the Wire
17. All Falls Down
18. Touch the Sky
19. Gold Digger
20. All of the Lights
21. Stronger (Contains simples from Chariots Of Fire (Vangelis song)
22. Runaway
23. Lost in the World
24. Hey Mama

Setlist: Shakira (28 May 2011)
1. "Pienso en Ti"
2. "Why Wait"
3. "Te Dejo Madrid"
4. "Whenever, Wherever" (contains excerpts from "Unbelievable")
5. "Inevitable"
6. "A'atini El Nay" (Interlude) (Fairuz cover)
7. Medley: "Nothing Else Matters" / "Despedida"
8. "Gypsy"
9. "La Tortura"
10. "Ciega, Sordomuda"
11. "Underneath Your Clothes"
12. "Sale el Sol"
13. "Las de la Intuición"
14. "Loca"
15. "She Wolf" (contains elements of "Mapalé")
16. "Ojos Así"

Encore

17. "Hips Don't Lie"
18. "Waka Waka (This Time for Africa)"

=== 2012 ===
The eleventh edition was held from 18 May to 26 May 2012 at the OLM Souissi as well as other stages on Rabat. The show was opened on the Friday with LMFAO during their Sorry For Party Rocking Tour. Also other following performances by Pitbull (Planet Pit World Tour), Evanescence (Evanescence Tour), Scorpions (Get Your Sting and Blackout World Tour), Jimmy Cliff, Nigel Kennedy, Khaled, Gloria Gaynor (in Mohammed V theatre), Lenny Kravitz who spent his birthday on stage, and without forgetting the epic finale: The historical performance by the American diva Mariah Carey (exclusive concert "doesn't belong to any of her tours").

House DJs were Yolanda Be Cool and DJ Abdel.

Setlist: LMFAO (18 May 2012)
1. "Rock The Beat II"
2. "Sorry For Party Rocking"
3. "Get Crazy"
4. "Take It To The Hole"
5. "Put That A$$ To Work"
6. "I'm in Miami Bitch"
7. "Gettin Over You"
8. "Boom Boom Pow"
9. "Shooting Star"
10. "Reminds Me Of You"
11. "I Am Not A Whore"
12. "Hot Dog"
13. "One Day"
14. "La La La"
15. "Yes"
16. "Quest Crew Dance Mashup"
17. "Shots"

Encore

18. "Party Rock Anthem"
19. "Champagne Showers"
20. "Sexy And I Know It"

Setlist: Pitbull (19 May 2012)
1. "Mr. Worldwide" (Intro)
2. "Hey Baby (Drop It to the Floor)"
3. "Triumph"
4. "Can't Stop Me Now"
5. "Smells Like Teen Spirit" (Nirvana cover)
6. "I Like (The Remix)"
7. "Sexy and I Know It" (LMFAO cover)
8. "International Love"
9. "Pause"
10. "Hello" (Martin Solveig cover)
11. "Party Rock Anthem" (LMFAO cover)
12. "I'm From Miami Trick" (LMFAO re-made song)
13. "Move Shake Drop"
14. "Shut It Down"
15. "Sweet Child O' Mine" (Guns N' Roses cover)
16. "Rain Over Me"
17. "Ai Se Eu Te Pego" (Michel Teló cover)
18. "Bon, Bon" (Include simples from "We No Speak Americano")
19. "Throw Your Hands Up (Danza Kuduro)" (Don Omar & Lucenzo cover)
20. "Alright"
21. "Krazy"
22. "Feel So Close" (Calvin Harris cover)
23. "Back In Time"
24. "Barbra Streisand" (Duck Sauce cover)
25. "Shake Señora"
26. "Shake"
27. "Culo"
28. "I Know You Want Me (Calle Ocho)"
29. "On the Floor" (Jennifer Lopez song featuring Pitbull)
30. "I Like It" (Enrique Iglesias song featuring Pitbull)
31. "DJ Got Us Fallin' in Love" (Usher song featuring Pitbull)
32. "Hotel Room Service"
33. "I Gotta Feeling (FMIF Remix)" (The Black Eyed Peas cover)
34. "Crazy People" (Sak Noel re-made song)
35. "Latinos In Paris" (Jay-z & Kanye West re-made song)
36. "Give Me Everything"
37. "Dance Again" (Jennifer Lopez song featuring Pitbull)

Setlist: Evanescence (20 May 2012)
1. "What You Want"
2. "Going Under"
3. "The Other Side"
4. "Weight of the World"
5. "The Change"
6. "Made of Stone"
7. "Lost in Paradise"
8. "My Heart Is Broken"
9. "Lithium"
10. "Erase This"
11. "Sick"
12. "Call Me When You're Sober"
13. "Imaginary"
14. "Never Go Back"
15. "Bring Me to Life"

Encore

16. "Swimming Home"
17. "Your Star"
18. "My Immortal"

Setlist: Scorpions (24 May 2012)
1. "Sting in the Tail"
2. "Make It Real"
3. "Is There Anybody There?" / "Bad Boys Running Wild"
4. "The Zoo"
5. "Coast to Coast"
6. "Loving You Sunday Morning"
7. "Living for Tomorrow" (in Russia)
8. "The Best Is Yet to Come" / "Rhythm of Love"
9. "Send Me an Angel" / "Always Somewhere"
10. "Holiday"
11. "Raised on Rock"
12. "Tease Me Please Me"
13. "Hit Between the Eyes" / "Dynamite"
14. "Kottak Attack"
15. "Blackout"
16. "Six String Sting"
17. "Big City Nights"

Encore:

1. "Still Loving You"
2. "Wind of Change"
3. "No One Like You" (in America)
4. "Rock You Like a Hurricane"
5. "When the Smoke Is Going Down"

Setlist: Lenny Kravitz (25 May 2012)
1. Come On Get It
2. Always on the Run
3. American Woman (The Guess Who cover)
4. It Ain't Over 'til It's Over
5. Mr. Cab Driver
6. Black and White America
7. Fields of Joy
8. Stand By A Woman
9. Believe
10. Stand
11. Rock Star City Life
12. Where Are We Runnin'?
13. Fly Away
14. Are You Gonna Go My Way
15. Let Love Rule

Setlist: Mariah Carey (26 May 2012)
1. Fantasy (Def Club Remix)
2. It's Like That
3. Shake It Off
4. Underneath The Stars
5. I'll Be There (The Jackson 5 cover)
6. Obsessed
7. Touch My Body
8. Can't Take That Away (Mariah's Theme)
9. Always Be My Baby
10. Heartbreaker
11. My All
12. Dreamlover
13. Honey
14. We Belong Together
15. Hero
16. Without You
17. Butterfly

=== 2013 ===
Mawazine took place from 24 May to 1 June.

International stars in OLM Souissi stage : Rihanna opened the festival as a part of her Diamonds World Tour; she made history by performing to one of the largest crowds of all time, performing in front of 150,000 people. This was a standoff with the Shakira's 2011 performance in terms of the number of audiences. Other artists included Jessie J (Nice to Meet You Tour), MIKA, Sexion d'Assaut, The Jacksons (Unity Tour), David Guetta, Deep Purple (Now What? World Tour), Enrique Iglesias during his (Enrique Iglesias India Tour) featuring the Moroccan-Swedish pop star Loreen, R&B singer Cee-Lo Green and Taio Cruz.

Arab (oriental) stars in Nahda stage : Day 1) Walid Taoufic. Day 2) Mouhcine Salahdine, Sherine Abdel Wahab, Farid Ghennam. Day 3) Bouchra Khalid, Mohamed Mounir. Day 4) Rabab, Cheb Mami. Day 5) Abed, Najwa Karam. Day 6) Zakaria Ghafouli, Assi El Hellani, Mourad Bouriki. Day 7) Shada Hassoun, Ahlam. Day 8) Hatim Ammor, Houda Saad. Day 8) Leila Al Maghribiya, Ahmed Chawki, Tamer Housni.

Moroccan scene in Salé stage : Siham, Jil Ghiwan Jalal, Ghiwane Salwan, LooNope, Jbara, Mjid Bekkas, Aouatif, Mohamed Anbari, Fatim Zahra Laaroussi, Atika Ammar, Numedia et Mallal, Izenzaren Abdelhadi, M.boy, Barry, Casa Crew, Hamid Kasri, Chaht Man, H-Kayne, Don Bigg, Ben Moussa, Hajib, Rachid Lamrini, Mohammed Iskandar, Najat Atabou, Tarik Laamirat, Said Mouskir, Hamid Hadri.

Other stars in so many other stages : Haj Youness, Amir Ali, Leila Lamrini, Tinariwen, African United, Gnawa Diffusion, Amadou & Meriem, Blitz The Ambassador, George Benson, Bond Girls, Sandra Nkaké, Lotfi Bouchnak, Abdelwahab Doukkali, Patrizia Laquidara, Ensemble Dragon.

Setlist: Rihanna (24 May 2013)
1. "Mother Mary"
2. "Phresh Out the Runway"
3. "Birthday Cake"
4. "Talk That Talk"
5. "Pour It Up"
6. "Cockiness (Love It)"
7. "Numb"
8. "You da One"
9. "Man Down"
10. "No Love Allowed"
11. "Rude Boy"
12. "What's My Name?"
13. "Jump"
14. "Umbrella"
15. "All of the Lights" (Kanye West song feat. Rihanna)
16. "Rockstar 101"
17. "What Now"
18. "Loveeeeeee Song"
19. "Love the Way You Lie (Part II)" / "Take A Bow" / "Cold Case Love"
20. "Hate That I Love You"
21. "Red Lipstick"
22. "We Found Love"
23. "S&M" / "Only Girl (In the World)" / "Don't Stop the Music"
24. "Where Have You Been"

Encore:

1. "Stay"
2. "Diamonds"

Setlist: Jessie J (25 May 2013)
1. "Price Tag"
2. "Who's Laughing Now"
3. "Rainbow"
4. "Stand Up"
5. "Nobody's Perfect"
6. "I Need This"
7. 80's Medley (Medley n°1):
  1. "Ain't Nobody" (Chaka Khan cover)
  2. "Emotions" (Mariah Carey cover)
  3. "Never Too Much" (Luther Vandross cover)
8. "Abracadabra"
9. A dedication to a random girl from the audience.
10. "Wild"
11. "I Don't Want To Miss A Thing" (Aerosmith cover)
12. "Who You Are"
13. Medley n°2:
  1. "Queen Of The Night" (Whitney Houston cover)
  2. "The Way You Make Me Feel" (Michael Jackson cover)
  3. "Work It Out" (Beyoncé cover)
14. "Do It Like A Dude" (Include simples from "Price Tag)"
15. "LaserLight"
16. "Domino"

Setlist: MIKA (26 May 2013)
1. Elle Me Dit
2. Relax, Take It Easy
3. Blue Eyes
4. Billy Brown
5. Rain
6. Popular Song
7. Big Girl (You Are Beautiful)
8. Origin Of Love
9. Stardust
10. Underwater
11. Stuck In The Middle
12. Celebrate
13. Love You When I'm Drunk
14. Lola
15. Happy Ending
16. Step With Me
17. Grace Kelly
18. Love Today
19. We Are Golden
20. Lollipop

Setlist: The Jacksons (28 May 2013)
1. Can You Feel It
2. Blame It on the Boogie
3. I Wanna Be Where You Are (from Michael Jackson's Got to Be There)
4. Rock with You (from Michael Jackson's Off the Wall)
5. Show You the Way to Go
6. Lovely One
7. Good Times
8. Looking Through The Windows
9. Time Waits for No One
10. Heaven Knows I Love You Girl
11. Push Me Away
12. Man of War
13. Gone Too Soon (From Michael Jackson's Dangerous)
14. The Jackson 5 medley :
  1. I Want You Back
  2. ABC
  3. The Love You Save
  4. Never Can Say Goodbye
15. All I Do Is Think Of You
16. I'll Be There
17. Dynamite (From Jermaine Jackson's Dynamite)
18. Let's Get Serious (From Jermaine Jackson's Let's get Serious)
19. Do What You Do (From Jermaine Jackson's Dynamite)
20. Can't Let Her Get Away (From Michael Jackson's Dangerous)
21. Heartbreak Hotel
22. Wanna Be Startin' Somethin' (from Michael Jackson's Thriller)
23. Don't Stop 'Til You Get Enough (from Michael Jackson's Off the Wall)
24. Shake Your Body (Down to the Ground)

Setlist: David Guetta (29 May 2013)
1. Titanium
2. Just One Last Time
3. She Wolf (Falling to Pieces)
4. Pursuit Of Happiness (Kid Cudi cover)
5. Play Hard
6. Sexy B***h
7. Harlem Shake (Baauer cover)
8. Love Is Gone vs . Little Bad Girl
9. Turn Me On
10. Sweat (David Guetta Remix)
11. Don't You Worry Child (Swedish House Mafia cover)
12. Right Now (Rihanna feat. David Guetta)
13. Wild Ones (Flo Rida cover)
14. Iron (Nicky Romero & Calvin Harris song)
15. Pandor (Tony Romera song) (Hardwell Rambo Edit)
16. Wakanda (Dimitri Vegas & Like Mike cover)
17. Head Up (Arno Cost cover)
18. One Love
19. When Love Takes Over
20. Memories
21. Moombah (Afrojack Remix) (Chuckie cover)
22. Rock The House (Afrojack cover)
23. Aerodynamic (Daft Punk cover)
24. I Can Only Imagine
25. I Could Be The One (Avicii & Nicky Romero cover)
26. Without You
27. Wonderwall (Oasis cover)

Setlist: Deep Purple (30 May 2013)
1. "Fireball" (From Fireball)
2. "Into The Fire" (From Deep Purple in Rock)
3. "Hard Lovin' Man" (From Deep Purple in Rock)
4. "Highway Star" (From Machine Head)
5. "Strange Kind of Woman" (From Fireball)
6. "The Battle Rages On" (From The Battle Rages On)
7. "Knocking At Your Back Door" (From Perfect Strangers)
8. "Contact Lost" (From Bananas)
9. "Wasted Sunsets" (From Perfect Strangers)
10. "The Well-Dressed Guitar" (From Rapture of the Deep – Tour Edition)
11. "The Mule" (From Fireball)
12. "Lazy" (From Machine Head)
13. "No One Came" (From Fireball)
14. "Perfect Strangers" (From Perfect Strangers)
15. "Space Truckin'" (From Machine Head)
16. "Smoke on the Water" (From Machine Head)

Encore

17. "Hush" (Billy Joe Royal cover) (From Shades of Deep Purple)
18. "Black Night" (From Deep Purple in Rock)

Setlist: Loreen (31 May 2013)
1. "In My Head"
2. "No Woman, No Cry" (Bob Marley cover)
3. "We Got the Power"
4. "My Heart Is Refusing Me"
5. "Euphoria"
6. "Crying Out Your Name"
7. "Sober"
8. "If She's the One"
9. "Sidewalk"
10. "Breaking Robot"
11. "Heal"

Encore

12. "Euphoria" (Remix)

Setlist: CeeLo Green (1 June 2013)
1. Bright Lights Bigger City
2. Let's Dance (David Bowie cover)
3. Champain
4. Wildflower
5. Don't Cha (Pussycat Dolls cover)
6. Satisfied
7. Smiley Faces (Gnarls Barkley cover)
8. Gone Daddy Gone (Violent Femmes cover)
9. Crazy (Gnarls Barkley cover)
10. Fuck You!

Setlist: Taio Cruz (1 June 2013)
1. Hangover
2. Break Your Heart
3. There She Goes
4. Without You (David Guetta cover)
5. Little Bad Girl (David Guetta feat. Taio Cruz & Ludacris)
6. DJing Session by Taio Cruz :
  1. Call Me Maybe (Carly Rae Jepsen song)
  2. Greyhound (Swedish House Mafia song)
  3. I Could Be The One (Avicii & Nicky Romero cover)
  4. Every Teardrop Is a Waterfall (Coldplay song)
  5. City Of Dreams (Dirty South, Alesso & Rudy song)
  6. Levels (Avicii song)
  7. Walking On A Dream (Empire Of The Sun song)
  8. REJ (Dimitri Vegas & Like Mike song)
  9. I Love It (Icona Pop song)
  10. Diamonds In The Sky (TV ROCK, Hook N Sling & Rudy song)
  11. Somebody That I Used to Know (Gotye song)
  12. Sunrise (The Aston Shuffle & Tommy Trash song)
  13. Vertigo (Daddy's Groove & Cryogenix song)
  14. Seven Nation Army (The White Stripes song) (sung by Taio Cruz)
  15. Don't You Worry Child (Swedish House Mafia song)
7. Dirty Picture (with Ke$ha's voice)
8. Troublemaker
9. Higher
10. Dynamite
11. Hangover (sung one more time as Outro)

=== 2014 ===
Mawazine was held this year from 30 May until 7 June. Many artists performed starting with Justin Timberlake, for the opening (The 20/20 Experience World Tour) on 30 May which marked his first performance in Morocco, Jason Derülo as part of Tattoos World Tour on 31 May, the mythic French hip-hop group IAM on 1 June, the Belgian house producer and singer Stromae promoting his new album Racine Carrée on 2 June, Kool & the Gang on 3 June, the R&B sensation Ne-Yo on 4 June.Robert Plant the former vocalist of one of the best rock bands ever Led Zeppelin with his new founded band The Sensational Space Shifters on 5 June, the Latino icon Ricky Martin on 6 June, and the finale of this season the strong-voiced R&B diva Alicia Keys on 7 June.

Setlist: Justin Timberlake (30 May 2014)
1. "Pusher Love Girl"
2. "Gimme What I Don't Know (I Want)" (Snippet)
3. "Rock Your Body"
4. "Don't Hold the Wall" (Snippet)
5. "FutureSex/LoveSound"
6. "Like I Love You"
7. "Let Me Talk To You"
8. "My Love"
9. "TKO"
10. "SummerLove"
11. "LoveStoned"
12. "Until The End Of Time"
13. "Holy Grail" (Jay-Z's song featuring Justin Timberlake)
14. "Cry Me A River"
15. "Señorita"
16. "Take Back the Night"
17. "Shake Your Body (Down to the Ground)" (The Jackson 5 cover)
18. "Heartbreak Hotel" (Elvis Presley cover)
19. "Not A Bad Thing"
20. "Human Nature" (Michael Jackson cover)
21. "What Goes Around.../...Comes Around"
22. "Suit & Tie"
23. "SexyBack"
24. "Mirrors"

Setlist: Jason Derülo (31 May 2014)
1. "In My Head"
2. "Whatcha Say"
3. "Stupid Love"
4. "Ridin' Solo"
5. "Marry Me"
6. "The Other Side" (Acoustic)
7. "It Girl"
8. "Breathing"
9. "Fight For You"
10. "With The Lights On"
11. "Royals" (Lorde cover)
12. "Vertigo"
13. "Side FX"
14. "Don't Wanna Go Home"
15. "The Other Side"
16. "Talk Dirty"
17. "Wiggle"
18. "Trumpets"

Setlist: Ne-Yo (4 June 2014)
1. "Let's Go" (Calvin Harris song featuring Ne-Yo)
2. "Knock You Down" (Keri Hilson song featuring Kanye West & Ne-Yo)
3. "Beautiful Monster"
4. "Don't Make Em Like You"
5. "Mad"
6. "Miss Independent"
7. "Burning Up"
8. "So Sick"
9. "Stay"
10. "Champagne Life"
11. "Make Me Better" (Fabulous song featuring Ne-Yo)
12. "Baby by Me" (50 Cent song featuring Ne-Yo)
13. "Leave You Alone" (Young Jeezy song featuring Ne-Yo)
14. "One In A Million"
15. "Because Of You"
16. "Sexy Love"
17. "Lazy Love"
18. "Closer"
19. "Play Hard" (David Guetta song featuring Ne-Yo & Akon)
20. "Give Me Everything" (Pitbull song featuring Ne-Yo, Nayer & Afrojack)
21. "Let Me Love You (Until You Learn to Love Yourself)"

Setlist: IAM (1 June 2014)
1. "Debout les braves"
2. "Quand tu allais, on revenait"
3. "L'école du micro d'argent"
4. "C.Q.F.D."
5. "Nés sous la même étoile"
6. "Notre‐Dame veille"
7. "Samurai" (Shurik'n cover)
8. "Spartiate Spirit"
9. "Habitude"
10. "Fuck le refrain"
11. "Si j'avais 20 ans"
12. "L'empire du côté obscur"
13. DJ Daz (Medley n°1)
14. "Marvel"
15. "Bad Boys de Marseille (part II)" (Akhenaton cover)
16. "Tous les saints de la Terre"
17. "Bouger la tête"
18. "Dangereux"
19. "Au quartier"
20. "Sombres Manœuvres/Manœuvres sombres"
21. "Les Raisons de la colère"
22. Medley n°2 :
  1. "La Face B"
  2. "Chez le Mac"
  3. "Independenza"
  4. "Tu le Sais"
23. "La Part du démon"
24. Medley n°3 :
  1. "La Ronde"
  2. "La Garde Meurt Mais Ne Se Rend Pas"
  3. "Offishall"
25. "Un bon son brut pour les truands"
26. "La Saga"
27. "Pain au chocolat"
28. "Ouais c'est ça"
29. "Demain, c'est loin"
30. "Je danse le mia"
31. "Petit Scarabée"
32. "Petit frère"
33. "Dernier Coup d’éclat"

Setlist: Stromae (2 June 2014)
1. "Ta Fête"
2. "Bâtard"
3. "Peace Or Violence"
4. "Te Quiero"
5. "Tous Les Mêmes"
6. "Ave Cesaria"
7. "Sommeil"
8. "Quand C'est ?"
9. "Moules Frites"
10. "Formidable"
11. "Carmen"
12. "Humain à L'eau"
13. "Alors On Danse"
14. "Encore"
15. "Papaoutai"
16. "Merci"

Setlist: Ricky Martin (6 June 2014)
1. "Come with Me"
2. "Shake Your Bon-Bon"
3. "It's Alright"
4. "Vuelve"
5. "Livin' la Vida Loca"
6. "She Bangs"
7. "Loaded"
8. "She's All I Ever Had"
9. "Private Emotion"
10. "Nobody Wants to Be Lonely"
11. "Más"
12. "La Bomba"
13. "Lola, Lola"
14. "Pégate" (with elements of Por Arriba, Por Abajo)
15. "María"
16. "The Cup of Life"

Setlist: Alicia Keys (7 June 2014)
1. "Karma"
2. "You Don't Know My Name"
3. "Tears Always Win"
4. "Listen to Your Heart"
5. "Like You'll Never See Me Again"
6. "A Woman's Worth" (with elements from "Another Way to Die")
7. "Diary"
8. "Try Sleeping with a Broken Heart"
9. "Fallin'"
10. "When It's All Over"
11. "Murder She Wrote"
12. "Unbreakable"
13. "How Come You Don't Call Me" (Performed by background vocalists)
14. "If I Ain't Got You"
15. "No One"
16. "New Day"
17. "Girl On Fire"

Encore

18. "Brand New Me"
19. "Empire State of Mind (Part II) Broken Down"

=== 2015 ===
This year's edition of Mawazine Festival is set to new records of attendance. 160,000 people attended the concert of American singer Jennifer Lopez at the opening of the festival, and 180,000 people attended Pharrell Williams concert on Saturday, May 30. The concert of DJ Avicii attracted over 200,000 festival-goers, on Monday, June 1 at the OLM Soussi stage of Rabat, as part of the 14th Mawazine Festival-Rhythms of the World, according to the organizers.

Setlist: Jennifer Lopez (29 May 2015)
1. "Booty"
2. "Love Don't Cost A Thing"
3. Medley :
  1. "Ain't It Funny (Murder Remix)"
  2. "All I Have"
  3. "I'm Real (Murder Remix)"
4. "Get Right"
5. "Girls" / "If You Had My Love" (Dancing act by Jennifer Lopez)
6. "I'm Into You"
7. "Waiting For Tonight"
8. "Feel The Light"
9. "First Love"
10. "Do It Well"
11. "Hold It Don't Drop It" (including elements of "Goin' In" & "Papi")
12. "Let's Get Loud"
13. "Dance Again"
14. "On The Floor"
15. "Jenny From The Block" (including elements of "Same Girl")

Setlist: Pharrell Williams (30 May 2015)
1. "Come Get It Bae"
2. "Frontin'"
3. "Hunter"
4. "Marilyn Monroe"
5. "Brand New"
6. Medley :
  1. "Hot In Herre" (Nelly cover)
  2. "I Just Wanna Love U (Give It 2 Me)" Jay Z cover)
  3. "Pass the Courvoisier, Part II" (Busta Rhymes cover)
7. "Gush"
8. "Rockstar"
9. "Lapdance"
10. "She Wants to Move"
11. "Beautiful" / "Drop It Like It's Hot" (Snoop Dogg cover)
12. "It Girl"
13. "Hollaback Girl" (Gwen Stefani cover)
14. "Blurred Lines" (Robin Thicke cover)
15. "Get Lucky" (Daft Punk cover)
16. "Lose Yourself to Dance" (Daft Punk cover)
17. "Gust of Wind"
18. "Happy"

Setlist: Sean Paul (31 May 2015)
1. Intro (Including "Culo", "The Final Countdown" & "Animals")
2. "Come On To Me"
3. "Get Busy"
4. "Give It Up To Me"
5. "Got 2 Luv U"
6. "How Deep Is Your Love"
7. "Baby Boy" (Beyoncé song)
8. "Bailando" (Enrique Iglesias song)
9. "One Wine"
10. "Hey Baby"
11. "Infiltrate"
12. "Deport Them"
13. "Like Glue"
14. "Gimme The Light"
15. "We Be Burnin'"
16. "Riot"
17. "I'm Still In Love With You"
18. "Punkie"
19. "No Woman No Cry" (Bob Marley & The Wailers cover)
20. "Never Gonna Be The Same"
21. "Hold My Hand"
22. "Other Side Of Love"
23. "Lowe Me"
24. "Living The Dream"
25. "Take It Low"
26. "Want Dem All"
27. "She Doesn't Mind"
28. "Temperature"
29. "Turn It Up"

Setlist: Avicii (1 June 2015)
1. "Love Me Again" (John Newman song)
2. "Snake" (Blasterjaxx song)
3. "Addicted To You"
4. "Heaven"
5. "My Feelings For You"
6. "Make Your Move" (Dave Amstrong song)
7. "Echoes" (Henrik B, Niklas Gustavsson & Peter Johansson song)
8. "You Make Me"
9. "The Nights"
10. "All You Need Is Love"
11. "The Tracks Of My Tears" (The Miracles song)
12. "Utopia"
13. "Animals" (Martin Garrix song)
14. "Smile" (Galantis song)
15. "Superlove" (Lenny Kravitz song)
16. "Fade Into The Darkness"
17. "Maple" (Wasteland song)
18. "Rapture" (Nadia Ali song)
19. "Blessed" (Tom Hangs & Shermanology song)
20. "XXX" (Phunk Investigation song)
21. "Alcoholic"
22. "Tear It Down" (The Aston Shuffle song)
23. "Sunshine"
24. "Spectrum (Say My Name)" (Florance + The Machine song)
25. "Seek Bromance"
26. "Dear Boy"
27. "The Days"
28. "Return Of The Mack" (Mark Morrison song)
29. "I Could Be The One"
30. "Love Looks" (Style of Eye & Lars Allertz song)
31. "White Noise" (Disclosure song)
32. "Lovers On The Sun" (David Guetta song)
33. "Silhouettes"
34. "Hey Brother"
35. "Levels"
36. "Waiting For Love"
37. "On My Way" (Axwell /\ Ingrosso song)
38. "Coming Home" (Diddy – Dirty Money song)
39. "Flash" (Green Velvet song)
40. "Deep Down Low" (Valentino Khan song)
41. "Punx" (Tristan Garner song)
42. "Kangaroo" (Sander Van Doorn & Julian Jordan song)
43. "Antidote" (Swedish House Mafia& Knife Party song)
44. "Greyhound" (Swedish House Mafia song)
45. "Zeus" (John Dahlback song)
46. "Hypnotize" (The Notorious B.I.G. song)
47. "Wakanda" (Dimitri Vegas and Like Mike song)
48. "Power Glove" (Knife Party song)
49. "EDM Death Machine" (Knife Party song)
50. "Wake Me Up"

Setlist: AKON (3 June 2015)
1. "Shake Down"
2. "We Takin' Over" (DJ Khaled song)
3. "I'm So Paid"
4. "Soul Survivor" (Young Jeezy song)
5. "Ghetto"
6. "Sorry, Blame It On Me"
7. "Lonely"
8. "Sweetest Girl (Dollar Bill)" (Wyclef Jean song)
9. "I Love The Way She Moves" (Zion song)
10. "Don't Matter"
11. "Danza Kuduro" (Don Omar & Lucenzo cover)
12. "Oh Africa"
13. "Mama Africa"
14. "I Can't Wait"
15. "Against The Grain"
16. "Bartender" (T-Pain song)
17. "I Wanna Love You"
18. "Smack That"
19. "I Just Had Sex" (The Lonely Island song)
20. "Dangerous" (Kardinal Offishall song)
21. "Chop My Money" (P-Square song)
22. "Right Now (Na Na Na)"
23. "Angel"
24. "Keep You Much Longer"
25. DJing Session :
  1. "Habits (Stay High)" (Tove Lo song)
  2. "Papaoutai" (Stromae song)
  3. "Am I Wrong" (Nico & Vinz song)
  4. "Crunk It Up" (David Guetta song)
  5. "Shut It Down" (Pitbull song)
26. "Beautiful"
27. "Sexy Bitch" (David Guetta song)
28. "Play Hard" (David Guetta song)
29. "Millionaire Dance"
30. "Freedom"

Setlist: Usher (5 June 2015)
1. "OMG"
2. "Love In This Club"
3. "You Make Me Wanna..."
4. "Nice & Slow"
5. "U Remind Me"
6. "Caught Up"
7. "She Came To Give It To You"
8. "Climax"
9. "Confessions Part II"
10. Medley :
  1. "Hey Daddy (Daddy's Home)"
  2. "My Boo"
  3. "I Need A Girl" (P. Diddy song)
  4. "Lovers And Friends" (Lil Jon song)
  5. "New Flame" (Chris Brown song)
11. "I Don't Mind"
12. "Don't Look Down" / "Animals" ("Martin Garrix" song medley)
13. "More" (RedOne & Jimmy Joker Remix)
14. "Burn"
15. "U Got It Bad"
16. "Bad Girl"
17. "Good Kisser"
18. "U Don't Have To Call"
19. "Scream"
20. "DJ Got Us Fallin' In Love"
21. "Yeah!"
22. "Without You" (David Guetta song)

Stages	OLM Souissi	Nahda	Bouragrag	Salé	La Renaissance	Chellah	Théatre Mohammed V
Friday 29 May	Jennifer Lopez	Khalid Hajar / Ghazi El Amir / Saad Sattar	Temenik Electric	Bawss & Soultana / Khawla El Moujahed / Khansa Batma / Oum	TBA	TBA	TBA
Saturday 30 May	Pharrell Williams	Assala	Yuri Buenaventura	Nidal Ibourk / Moataz Abou Zouz / Aziz Al Maghribi / Mohamed Adly / Orchestre Ashjan Al Awetar	TBA	Srishti – Nina Rajarani / Dance Creations	Nihad Fathi / Orchestre Hafni
Sunday 31 May	Sean Paul	Amal Maher	P-Square	Najat Al Houceimiya / Imghrane / Mustapha Oumguil	TBA	Débora Russ	Magida El Roumi
Monday 1 June	Avicii	Maher Zain	Daara J Family	Melimane / Ibham Band / Issam & Abidate Rma / Essiham	Malek	Carmen Souza	Flavia Coelho
Tuesday 2 June	Placebo	Elissa	Black M	Gnawa Stone / Gnawa Click / Lamaalam Mahmoud Guinea	Les Frères & Les Fils Akkaf	Maria Berasarte	Barbara Hendricks
Wednesday 3 June	Akon	Melhem Zein	Yannick Noah	Babel / Rwapa Crew / Hassan Al Maghribi / Farid Ghannam / Mazagan & Hamid El Hadri	Haim Botbol	Lo Cor De La Plana	Mesut Kurtis
Thursday 4 June	Sting	Nabil Shuail	Les Ambassadeurs	Draganov / AZ Flow / Shayfeen / Chouft'Chouf / Fnaire	TBA	Luis De La Carrasca : Lo Essential	TBA
Friday 5 June	Usher	Dounia Batma / Ibtissam Tiskat / Fadwa Al Malki	Aziz Sahmaoui & Mamani Keita	Africa United / The Basement / Cheb Simo	Batoul Marouani	Katerina Fotinaki	Dorsaf Hamdani
Saturday 6 June	Maroon 5	Wael Kfoury	Metá Metá	Daoudi / Tahour	TBA	Özlem özdil	Bajeddoub / Abderrahim Souiri / Orchestre Debbi

=== 2016 ===
The 15th edition of Mawazine took place from 20 May to 28 May 2016. American singer Chris Brown and Australian rapper Iggy Azalea both performed at the OLM Souissi stage on 20 and 21 May respectively. Pitbull performed for 130 000 fans, and Saad Lamjarred performed for 140 000 people in the Nahda stage. The Dutch DJ Hardwell also performed in the festival for 180 000 people. The vocalist Christina Aguilera broke record with having over 250,000 people attend and she closed the festival on May 28.

Date	OLM Souissi	Nahda	Bouragrag	Salé	Chellah	Théatre Mohammed V
Friday, May 20	Chris Brown	Diana Haddad	Rokia Traoré	Hatim Idar, Mohammed Reda and Zinab Oussama	TBA	Kadhim Al-Sahir
Saturday, May 21	Iggy Azalea	Melhem Barakat	Marcus Miller	DJ K-Rim, Rhany and Saïda Fikri	Alireza Ghorbani	Alma de Tango
Sunday, May 22	Wyclef Jean	Myriam Fares	National Orchestra of Barbes	Ahouzar, Fatima Tachtoukt and Najat Tazi	Noëmie Waysfeld	Le Trio Joubran
Monday, May 23	Maître Gims	Hatem Al-Iraqi	Omar Sosa & Friends	Aminux, Sami Ray and Kader Japonais	The Musicians of Cairo	Natacha Atlas
Tuesday, May 24	Kendji Girac	Yara	Bombino	Hoba Hoba Spirit, Gabacho Maroc and Darga	Ines Bacán, Majid Bekkas et Pedro Soler	Qawwali Flamenco
Wednesday, May 25	Hardwell	Assi El Helani	Faiz Ali Faiz	Alamri, Hajib and Abdelaziz Stati	Antonio Castrignanò	Imany
Thursday, May 26	Shaggy	Sherine	The Afrobeat Experience	Muslim, H-Kayne, and H-name	Souffles Quartet	Paco Renteria
Friday, May 27	Pitbull	Saad Lamjarred	Ernest Ranglin & Friends	Douzi, Rachid Berriah and Rachid Casta	Kakushin Nishihara and Gaspar Claus	El Gusto
Saturday, May 28	Christina Aguilera	Saber Rebaï	Mokhtar Samba	Najat Aatabou, Bilal El Maghribi and Hamid El Mardi	Houria Aïchi	Safwan Bahlawan

=== 2017 ===
The 16th edition of Mawazine took place on 12 May to 20 May 2017.

Line-ups

Date	OLM Souissi	Nahda	Bouragrag	Salé	Chellah	Théatre Mohammed V
Friday, 12 May	Ellie Goulding	Sami Yusuf	Panache Culture	Fatima Zohra Laaroussi; Tahour; Latifa Raafat; Mustapha Regragui's Orchestra; Abderrahim Souiri	—N/a	Charles Aznavour
Saturday, 13 May	Wiz Khalifa	Majid al-Muhandis	MHD	Rabah Mariwri; Fatima Tabaamrant; Mustapha Oumghil	Vakia Stravrou	Badr Rami
Sunday, 14 May	Chic featuring Nile Rodgers	Nawal Al Zoghbi	Amadou & Mariam	Hamid Bouchnak; Cheba Maria; Cheb Kader	—N/a	Eleftheria Arvanitaki
Monday, 15 May	Ms. Lauryn Hill	Mohamed Al Salem; Hussein El Deek	Bonga	Hamid El Kasri; Mehdi Nassouli; Mustapha Bakbou	Maqâm Roads	Anoushka Shankar
Tuesday, 16 May	Booba	Fares Karam	Ibibio Sound Machine	Hamid Serghini; Zina Daoudia; Five Stars	Trio Chicuelo & Marco Mezquida	Charles Aznavour
Wednesday, 17 May	DJ Snake	Najwa Karam	Baloji	Batoul El Merouani; Cherkani Orchestra; Rachida Talal; Saida Charaf	Agathe Iracema	Susana Baca
Thursday, 18 May	Nick Jonas	Tamer Hosny	Pat Thomas & Kwashibu Area Band	La Fouine; Masta Flow; Don Bigg	Stella Gonis	Lotfi Bouchnak
Friday, 19 May	Demi Lovato	Asma Lamnawar; Hatim Ammor	Calypso Rose	Issam Kamal; Ribab Fusion; Farid Ghannam	Saodaj'	Rafael Amargo
Saturday, 20 May	Rod Stewart	George Wassouf	Alpha Blondy	Mustapha Bourgogne; Haj Abdelmoughit; Abdellah Daoudi	Elida Almeida	Jahida Wehbe

Set lists

Setlist: Ellie Goulding (12 May 2017)
1. "Aftertaste"
2. "Lights"
3. "Animal"
4. "Outside"
5. "Devotion"
6. "Keep On Dancin'"
7. "Don't Need Nobody"
8. "Figure 8"
9. "Tethered" (Rationale cover)
10. "First Time"
11. "Army"
12. "Something in the Way You Move"
13. "Paradise"
14. "On My Mind"
15. "Anything Could Happen"
16. "I Need Your Love"
17. "Starry Eyed"
18. "Burn"
19. "Love Me like You Do"

Setlist: Nick Jonas (18 May 2017)
1. "Bom Bidi Bom"
2. "Touch"
3. "Levels"
4. "The Difference"
5. "Good Thing"
6. "Who I Am"
7. "Give Love A Try"
8. "S.O.S"
9. "Santa Barbara"
10. "Under You"
11. "Bacon"
12. "Numb"
13. "Chains"
14. "Last Time Around"
15. "Good Girls"
16. "Teacher"
17. "Champagne Problems"
18. "Chainsaw"
19. "Introducing Me"
20. "Close"
21. "Jealous"

Setlist: Demi Lovato (19 May 2017)
1. "Confident"
2. "Heart Attack"
3. "Fire Starter"
4. "For You"
5. "Body Say"
6. "Wildfire"
7. "My Love is Like a Star"
8. "Fix a Heart" / "Nightingale" / "Warrior"
9. "Two Pieces"
10. "Lionheart"
11. "Waitin for You"
12. "Old Ways"
13. "Kingdom Come"
14. "Got Dynamite"
15. "Don't Forget" / "Catch Me"
16. "Yes"
17. "Stone Cold"
18. "Skyscraper"
19. "Give Your Heart a Break"
20. "Neon Lights"
21. "Cool for the Summer"

=== 2018 ===
The 17th edition of Mawazine took place on 22 to 30 June 2018.

Line-ups

Date	OLM Souissi	Nahda	Bouragrag	Salé	Chellah	Théatre Mohammed V
22 June	Martin Garrix	Kadim Al-Saher	Ebo Taylor	Cravata; Reem; Ihab Amir	—N/a	Ara Malikian
23 June	French Montana	Saad Ramadan; Marwan Khoury	Oumou Sangaré	Nadia Laaroussi; Badr Soultan; Ibtissam Tiskat	Alireza Ghorbani	Hiba Tawaji
24 June	Jamiroquai	Melhem Zein; Rouwaida Attieh	Las Maravillas Del Mali	Tarik Farih; Maâlem Hassan Boussou; Nass El Ghiwane	Patrizia Laquidara	Babylone
25 June	Niska; Damso	Bosy; Hamaki	Tshegue; Chronixx	Lahoucine Ait Baamrane; Aziz Al Maghribi; Zakaria Ghafouli	El Amir	Fernando Egozcue Ensamble
26 June	The Chainsmokers	Ameer Dandan; Wael Jassar	Rilès	Khadija Atlas; Mehdi Weld Hajib; Hajib	Trio Andaaz	London Community Gospel Choir
27 June	Bruno Mars	Saber Rebaï	Sidiki Diabaté	Abdelali Sahraoui; Abidat Rma; Najat Aatabou	Maria Berasarte	Souad Massi
28 June	Texas	Aminux; Nancy Ajram	Orchestre Poly Rythmo de Cotonou	DJ Hamida; H-Kayne; Muslim	Sepideh Raissadat	Majida El Roumi
29 June	The Weeknd	Ahmed Chiba; Douzi	Seun Kuti & Egypt 80 featuring Yasiin Bey	Imad Benomar; Nouamane Belaiachi; Tiiw Tiiw	Katerina Fotinaki & Eva Atmatzidou	Maria Toledo
30 June	Luis Fonsi	Ahlam	Tiken Jah Fakoly	Statia; Said Senhaji; Stati	Sabry Mosbah	Marwa Naji

Set lists

Setlist: Bruno Mars (27 June 2018)
1. "Finesse"
2. "24K Magic"
3. "Treasure"
4. "Perm"
5. "Calling All My Lovelies"
6. "Chunky"
7. "That's What I Like"
8. "Versace on the Floor"
9. "Marry You"
10. "Runaway Baby"
11. "When I Was Your Man"
12. "Locked Out of Heaven"
13. "Just the Way You Are"
14. "Uptown Funk"

Setlist: The Weeknd (29 June 2018)
1. "Pray for Me"
2. "Starboy"
3. "Party Monster"
4. "Reminder"
5. "Six Feet Under" / "Low Life" / "Might Not"
6. "Sidewalks"
7. "Crew Love" / "House of Balloons"
8. "Secrets" / "Can't Feel My Face"
9. "I Feel It Coming"
10. "The Morning" / "Wicked Games"
11. "Earned It"
12. "Or Nah"
13. "Often"
14. "Acquainted"
15. "Wasted Times"
16. "Call Out My Name"
17. "The Hills"

=== 2019 ===
The 18th edition of Mawazine took place on 21 to 29 June 2019.

Line-ups

Date	OLM Souissi	Nahda	Bouragrag	Salé	Chellah	Théatre Mohammed V
21 June	J Balvin; Rosalía	Carole Samaha; Mohamed Réda	BCUC	Mustapha Bourgogne; Zahira Rbatia		Ballet Flamenco de Andalucía
22 June	David Guetta; Lartiste	Assi El Hallani; Yousra Saouf	Kokoko	Rabeh Mariwari; Zouhair Bahaoui	Kawa Generations	Mayada El Hennawy
23 June	Dadju; Bigflo & Oli	Myriam Fares; Oka Wi Ortega	Kery James	Saida Charaf; Jbara	She'Koyokh Quintet	Mashrou' Leila
24 June	Future; Orelsan	Mohammed Assaf; Saad El Soghayar	Les Amazones d'Afrique	Reda Taliani; Saida Titrit	Marcela & Los Murchales	Abd al Malik
25 June	The Black Eyed Peas	Elissa; Hamid El Hadri	Delgres	YouNess; Aicha Tachinwit	Alba Molina	Julien Clerc
26 June	Travis Scott; Aya Nakamura	Walid Toufic; Diana Karazon	Youssoupha	Lbenj; Manal	Compagnie Sharmila Sharma	Sister Sledge
27 June	Migos	Ramy Ayach; Hasna Zalagh	Kamasi Washington	Fnaïre; Maâlem Hamid El Kasri	Shahrokh Moshkin Ghalam	The Stanley Clarke Band
28 June	Marshmello	Najwa Karam; Abu	Vaudou Game	Abdellah Daoudi; Ikram El Abdia	Dan Gharibian Trio	Samir Toumi & Sanaa Marahati
29 June	Maluma; Karol G	Hussain Al Jassmi; Zinab Oussama	Koba LaD	Zina Daoudia; Hamid El Mardi	Luis de la Carrasca	Mohamed Mohsen

=== 2024 ===
Mawazine returned for its 19th edition from June 21 to 29, 2024, after a three-year hiatus due to COVID-19 pandemic, drawing a record-breaking 2.5 million attendees to Rabat and Salé, solidifying its status as a premier global music event.

The OLM Souissi stage hosted global icons including Nicki Minaj, who performed for 200,000 fans, and Calvin Harris, who attracted a staggering 250,000 people. Other international highlights included Camila Cabello, who embraced local traditions, and Central Cee, who wore a traditional Moroccan jellaba during his set.

ATEEZ made history as the first K-Pop act to headline the festival, delivering an electrifying June 23 performance that served as a homecoming after filming their debut music video in the Moroccan Sahara.

The event further celebrated regional talent with performances by Samira Said and Haifa Wehbe on the Nahda stage, local legends Najat Aatabou and Abdelaziz Stati in Salé, and a unique Umm Kulthum hologram show at the Mohammed V Theatre.

==== Line-ups ====
Date	OLM Souissi	Nahda	Bouragrag	Salé	Chellah	Théatre Mohammed V
21 June	Kylie Minogue	Angham	Didi B	Mocci; Latifa Raafat		Carole Samaha
22 June	Metro Boomin; Dabeull	Ahmed Saad	La Fève	Zina Daoudia; Leila Chakir	Macha Gharibian	Badr Rami
23 June	ATEEZ; Alawn	Balqees	Luidji; Yamê	Muslim; Ihsane Regragui	Cuarteto Tafi	Umm Kulthum
24 June	SCH; Gazo & Tiakola	Haifa Wehbe	Omah Lay	Hamid Kassri; Said Mosker	Tania Saleh	Yuri Buenaventura
25 June	Camila Cabello; Nicki Nicole	Jannat; Nawal El Zoghbi	Fatoumata Diawara	Ikram El Abdia; Abdou El Ouazzani	Aïda Nosrat	Umm Kulthum; Abeer Nehme
26 June	Burna Boy	Balti	Ayra Starr	Ibtissam Tisakt; Najat Aatabou	Dafné Kritharas	Marwan Khoury
27 June	Central Cee; IAMDDB	Najwa Karam; Douzi	Too Fan	Mouss Maher; Khadija Atlas	Agathe Iracema	Gregory Porter
28 June	Nicki Minaj	Ramy Ayach	James BKS; Nana Benz du Togo	Stati Abdelaziz; Fatima Tabaamrant	Awa Ly & Arshid Azarine Trio	Samira Said
29 June	Calvin Harris; MK	Aminux; Mohamed Ramadan	Angelique Kidjho	Said Senhaji; Saida Charaf	Çigdem Aslan	Adam

=== 2025 ===
The Maroc Culture Association has announced that the 20th Edition of the Mawazine Festival will take place in Rabat from 20 to 28 June 2025.

==== Line-ups ====
Date	OLM Souissi	Nahda Space	Bouregreg	Salé Beach	Historical Site of Chellah	Mohammed V National Theater
20 June	Afrojack	Ruby	Burning Spear	Hamza Senhaji; Adil Medkouri; Hajib		Wael Jassar
21 June	50 Cent	Mohamed Hamaki	Yemi Alade	Duke; Cravata; Lazaro	Egyptian Project	Ziad Bourji
22 June	Becky G	Nancy Ajram	Cheikh Lô	Rachida Talal; Mounim Slimani; Najat Aatabou	Angelica Lopez	Michael Kiwanuka
23 June	Kid Cudi	Shatha Hassoun; Nordo	Etuk Ubong	Ali Samid; 7-Toun; Nadia Laaroussi	Malik Diaw	Abdel Halim Hafez Hologram
24 June	Aespa	Yosra Saouf; Ragheb Alama	De La Soul	Kaoutar Berrani; Mohamed Adly; Zakaria Ghafouli	Luis Salazar	Tamer Ashour
25 June	Will Smith	Fnaire; Diana Haddad	Ans T Crazy	Habib Salam; Adil Miloudi; Tarek Five Stars	Banista	Lila Downs; Slimane
26 June	Lojay; Wizkid	Aminux; Miryam Fares	Al Qasar & Guests	Rafie; Draganov; Badr Ouabi	Mahaleb	Kadim Al Sahir
27 June	MoBlack; Lost Frequencies	Boudchart	Salif Keita	Sami Ray; L'Morphine; Daoudi	Soukaina Fahsi	Saber Rebai
28 June	El Grande Toto; Lil Baby	Mohamed Fadel Chaker; Sherine	Julian Marley	Badr Sabry; Abdelgha4; Abdelaziz Stati	Gülay Hacer Toruk	Majda El Roumi

=== 2026 ===
The Maroc Cultures Association has announced that the 21th Edition of the Mawazine Festival will take place in Rabat from 19 to 27 June 2026.

This edition also coincedes with 2026 FIFA World Cup, Mawazine announced that festival venues will also broadcast matches of the Morocco national football team on their screens after the concerts, through a partnership with BeIN Sports.
