= Full Frequency Tour =

2014 concert tour by Sean Paul

- Tour by Sean Paul
- Promotional poster for the tour
- Associated album: Full Frequency
- Start date: May 5, 2014
- End date: November 22, 2014
- Legs: 3
- No. of shows: 23 in Europe; 2 in Asia; 3 in North America; 1 in Africa; 7 in Australasia; 36 total

Sean Paul concert chronology
- Tomahawk Technique Tour (2012–13); Full Frequency Tour (2014); Outta Control Tour (2016)

The Full Frequency Tour was a concert tour by Jamaican recording artist, Sean Paul. The tour supports his sixth studio album, Full Frequency (2014). The rapper played over 30 shows primarily in Europe, with additional shows in Asia, North America, Africa and Australasia.

== Critical reception ==
Senior music writer George Palathingal of The Sydney Morning Herald gave the concert in Sydney four stars. He expressed: "We have to start with some brutal truth. Early 2000s luminaries Sean Paul and his current touring partner Mýa haven't exactly troubled the mainstream in recent years—certainly not in Australia; minimally, even, in the urban-music-loving US." However he noted, "Nonetheless, on this night, both not only prove to have a sizeable, dedicated following, they still perform as though they're at the peak of their careers."

Speaking on behalf of Mýa's set, Palathingal wrote, "Mýa is all class. She soulfully sings, dances and, over a couple of costume changes, even dresses like the (ghetto) superstar she only almost became when she was cavorting around in her smalls with Pink, Christina Aguilera and Lil' Kim as the least-impressive name on the 2001 "Lady Marmalade" cover." Writing on behalf of Paul’s performance, he said, "Here, however, the mohawked Paul and his thunderous backing band play an unselfish set loaded with sizzling, pounding takes on the early likes of "Get Busy", "Give It Up to Me", "Like Glue" and "Temperature", rather than constantly force recent material down your throat, and the results are irresistible."

Concluding in his review, "And if there's one lesson we can learn from this night it's that even if we might question his choices on record, live, Sean Paul still definitely knows what he's doing."

The Gleaner gave the concert a positive review as well and wrote, "A scintillating set, complete with full band, DJ, supporting vocals and dancers, Sean Paul electrified the hall for well over an hour and well past curfew. Yet, the audience rocked, danced and screamed as each hit was followed by another hit."

== Opening acts ==
- Fii (Germany)
- Die Boys (Germany)
- Mýa (Australia)
- Young Men Society (Sydney)
- Lazy J (Sydney)

== Setlist ==
This setlist was obtained from the concert held on May 10, 2014, at the Rockhal in Esch-sur-Alzette, Luxembourg. It does not represent all concerts for the duration of the tour.

1. "Want Dem All"
2. "So Fine"
3. "Get Busy"
4. "Give It Up to Me"
5. "Got 2 Luv U"
6. "How Deep Is Your Love"
7. "Hey Baby"
8. "Baby Boy" / "Break It Off"
9. "Like Glue"
10. "Gimme the Light"
11. "We Be Burnin'"
12. "Hold On"
13. "Other Side of Love"
14. "I'm Still in Love with You"
15. "Punkie"
16. "Hold My Hand"
17. "Body"
18. "She Doesn't Mind"
19. "Temperature"
20. "Turn It Up"

== Tour dates ==
Date	City	Country	Venue
Europe
May 5, 2014	Vienna	Austria	Bank Austria Halle
May 6, 2014	Zürich	Switzerland	Komplex 457
May 8, 2014	Stuttgart	Germany	Hanns-Martin-Schleyer-Halle
May 9, 2014	Frankfurt	Germany	Festhalle Frankfurt
May 10, 2014	Esch-sur-Alzette	Luxembourg	Rockhal
May 11, 2014	Munich	Germany	Kulturhalle Zenith
May 13, 2014	Berlin	Germany	Columbiahalle
May 14, 2014	Bremen	Germany	ÖVB Arena
May 16, 2014	Hanover	Germany	Swiss Life Hall
May 17, 2014	Hamburg	Germany	Hamburger Stadtpark Freilichtbühne
May 18, 2014	Cologne	Germany	Palladium
May 19, 2014	Neu-Ulm	Germany	Ratiopharm Arena
May 21, 2014	Münster	Germany	Große Halle Münsterland
May 22, 2014	Kiel	Germany	Sparkassen-Arena
Asia		Germany	
June 15, 2014^{[A]}	Baku	Azerbaijan	Amburan Beach Club
June 21, 2014	Astana	Kazakhstan	Za-Za
Europe
July 4, 2014^{[B]}	Lahti	Finland	Mukkulan ranta
July 5, 2014^{[C]}	Birmingham	England	Perry Park
July 6, 2014^{[C]}	London	England	Finsbury Park
July 19, 2014^{[D]}	Montego Bay	Jamaica	Montego Bay Sports Complex
North America
August 2, 2014^{[E]}	Lévis	Canada	Parc Champigny
Europe
August 8, 2014^{[F]}	Zofingen	Switzerland	Lindenbühne
August 9, 2014^{[G]}	The Hague	Netherlands	De Uithof
August 10, 2014^{[H]}	Lokeren	Belgium	Grote Kaai
North America
August 16, 2014^{[I]}	Montreal	Canada	Old Port
August 17, 2014	Toronto	Canada	Sound Academy
Europe
August 19, 2014	Lloret de Mar	Spain	Disco Tropics
August 20, 2014^{[J]}	Benicàssim	Spain	Recinto de Festivales
Africa
August 22, 2014	Marrakesh	Morocco	Mariinski
Australasia
November 13, 2014	Sydney	Australia	Big Top
November 14, 2014	Perth	Australia	Metro City
November 15, 2014	Melbourne	Australia	Trak Lounge Bar
November 16, 2014	Adelaide	Australia	XL Nightclub
November 18, 2014	Cairns	Australia	Velvet Underground
November 21, 2014	Port Moresby	Papua New Guinea	Gold Club
November 22, 2014	Port Moresby	Papua New Guinea	Gold Club

Festivals and other miscellaneous performances
^{A} This concert was a part of the "Opening Party"
^{B} This concert was a part of "Summer Up"
^{C} This concert was a part of the "Wireless Festival"
^{D} This concert was a part of the "Reggae Sumfest"
^{E} This concert was a part of "Festivent Ville de Lévis"
^{F} This concert was a part of "Heitere Open Air"
^{G} This concert was a part of "Dreamland"
^{H} This concert was a part of "Lokerse Feesten"
^{I} This concert was a part of the "Montreal International Reggae Festival"
^{J} This concert was a part of "Rototom Sunsplash"

Cancellations and rescheduled shows

August 21, 2014	Chéraga, Algeria	La Coupole d’Alger Arena	Cancelled
November 7, 2014	Port Moresby, Papua New Guinea	Gold Club	Rescheduled to November 21, 2014
November 8, 2014	Port Moresby, Papua New Guinea	Gold Club	Rescheduled to November 22, 2014
November 13, 2014	Sydney, Australia	Hordern Pavilion	Moved to the Big Top
November 14, 2014	Melbourne, Australia	Festival Hall	Moved to the Trak Lounge Bar
November 15, 2014	Perth, Australia	Perth Arena	Moved to Metro City
November 16, 2014	Adelaide, Australia	HQ Complex	Moved to the XL Nightclub
November 18, 2014	Brisbane, Australia	Family Nightclub	Rescheduled to November 19, 2014, and moved to The Arena
November 19, 2014	Brisbane, Australia	The Arena	Cancelled
