= 2026 Mawazine Festival =

Music festival in Rabat, Morocco

Mawazine 2026
- Genre: Various
- Date: June 19–27, 2026
- Locations: Rabat, Morocco
- Country: Morocco
- Attendance: 3.6 million
- Organiser: Maroc Cultures
- Website: mawazine.ma

Mawazine 2026 was the 21st edition of the Mawazine Festival, an annual international music festival held in Rabat, Morocco. The festival took place from 19 to 27 June 2026 and was organised by the Maroc Cultures. The edition attracted approximately 3.6 million attendees, according to the organisers.

== Background ==
The previous 2025 edition of Mawazine received several criticism regarding several aspects of its organisation. Concerns were raised about the festival's programming choices, the representation of Moroccan artists, and logistical aspects of the event.

Preparations for the 2026 edition of Mawazine took place amid uncertainty surrounding the festival announcement. Unlike previous editions, the details of the 2026 programme were revealed later than usual, leading to speculation among festival followers about a possible cancellation or postponement. However Maroc Cultures later confirmed that the festival would take place from 19 to 27 June 2026.

The 2026 edition introduced several changes to the organisation of the festival, such as the addition of the Prince Moulay Abdellah Stadium and Royal Theatre of Rabat as new venues that will host the closing concerts.

== Line-up ==
The line-up for 2026 Mawazine Festival is as follows:

Date	OLM Souissi	Nahda	Bouregreg	Salé	Chellah	Mohammed V Theatre
19 June	Ninho	Hassan Shakosh	The Ancestors	Said Senhaji		Mayada El Hennawy
19 June		Saad El Soghayar		Mehdi Weld Hajib		
20 June	Major Lazer	Majid Al Mohandis	Stonebwoy	Aicha Maya	Senny Camara	Macy Gray
20 June				Rif Experience		
21 June	Tyla	Nacim Haddad	Djelykaba Bintou	Orchestre Tahour	Zulu	Marwa Nagy
21 June		Jaylann		Statia		
22 June	Nicky Jam (Cancelled, replaced by Gipsy Kings)	Asma Lamnawar	Pongo	7ari	Melina Vlachos	Imany
22 June	DJ Aden			Dizzy DROS		
23 June	Itzy	Wael Kfoury	Serge Beynaud	Youssef Louzini	Susana Travassos & João Frade	Nouamane Lahlou
23 June				Abdellah Daoudi		Sanaa Maharati
24 June	Rema	Hatim Ammor	Orchestra Baobab	Saida Titrit	AYOM	Margareth Menezes
24 June		Al Shami		Fatima Tabaamrant		
25 June	Tiësto	Karima Gouit	Sampa the Great	Hamid Serghini	Eneida Marta	Lotfi Bouchnak
25 June		Aminux		Abdelaziz Stati		
26 June	Tyga (Cancelled, replaced by Offset)	Boudchart	Oumou Sangaré	Oulad El Bouazzaoui	Parveen & Ilyas Khan	Dee Dee Bridgewater Quartet
26 June	Ty Dolla Sign			Saida Charaf		
27 June	Bebe Rexha	Tamer Hosny	Diamond Platnumz	Walid Rahmani	Ali Doğan Gönültaş	Dionne Warwick
27 June				Said Ould Al Houate		

=== Les Afters du Golf Dar Essalam ===
- 19 June: Tarek Five Stars, DJ Larby
- 20 June: Othmane Mouline, DJ Mouss
- 21 June: Khalid Bennani, Ateoo
- 22 June: Youssef Wahbi, DJ Larby
- 23 June: Driss El Bouazzaoui, DJ Mouss
- 24 June: El Haj Abdelmoughit, Ateoo
- 25 June: Younes Rbati, DJ Larby
- 26 June: Othmane Mouline, DJ Mouss
- 27 June: Ikram El Abdia, Ateoo

=== Les Afters du Chellah ===
- 19 June: Mokobé
- 20 June: Mr. ID
- 21 June: Dany Brillant
- 22 June: Gipsy Kings
- 23 June: Rhapsody
- 24 June: Jungeli
- 25 June: The Robots Daft Punk Tribute
- 26 June: DJ Abdel
- 27 June: Heuss

DJ Redsupa is announced as the DJ for all nights from the 19th to the 27th of June.

=== Prince Moulay Abdellah Stadium ===
Starting from 2026, Mawazine introduced the Prince Moulay Abdellah Stadium as a new festival venue that will host two major concerts during the closing weekend. The artists performing at the stadium are:

- 26 June: Douzi, Khaled
- 27 June: ElGrandeToto, Morad

=== Royal Theatre of Rabat ===
Mawazine also announced the Royal Theatre of Rabat as a new venue that will host a few concerts, the artists performing at the theatre are:

- 26 June: Dee Dee Bridgewater Quartet

== 2026 World Cup ==
The 2026 edition coincided with the 2026 FIFA World Cup, and festival organisers announced that matches involving the Morocco national football team would be broadcast on screens at festival venues after concerts, through a partnership with BeIN Sports.
