= Charaf =

Charaf is a surname. Notable people with the surname include:

- Rafic Charaf (1932–2003), Lebanese painter
- Saida Charaf (born 1981), Moroccan singer
- Wafae Charaf (born 1988), Moroccan human rights activist
