= C'est Bon =

C'est Bon or C'est bon may refer to:

- A 2011 song by The Supermen Lovers
- A 2012 song by Mouss Maher
- A 2012 album by Useless Eaters
- A 2019 song by Ténor, released by Universal Music Africa
- Thiebou Diola, a rice-based dish from Senegal
- An announcement made while playing Mistigri (card game)
- CBON-FM, a radio station in Sudbury, Ontario, Canada
- A 2013 film narrated by Jean-Pierre Coffe
