= AnoGhan =

Moroccan singer-songwriter (born 1990)

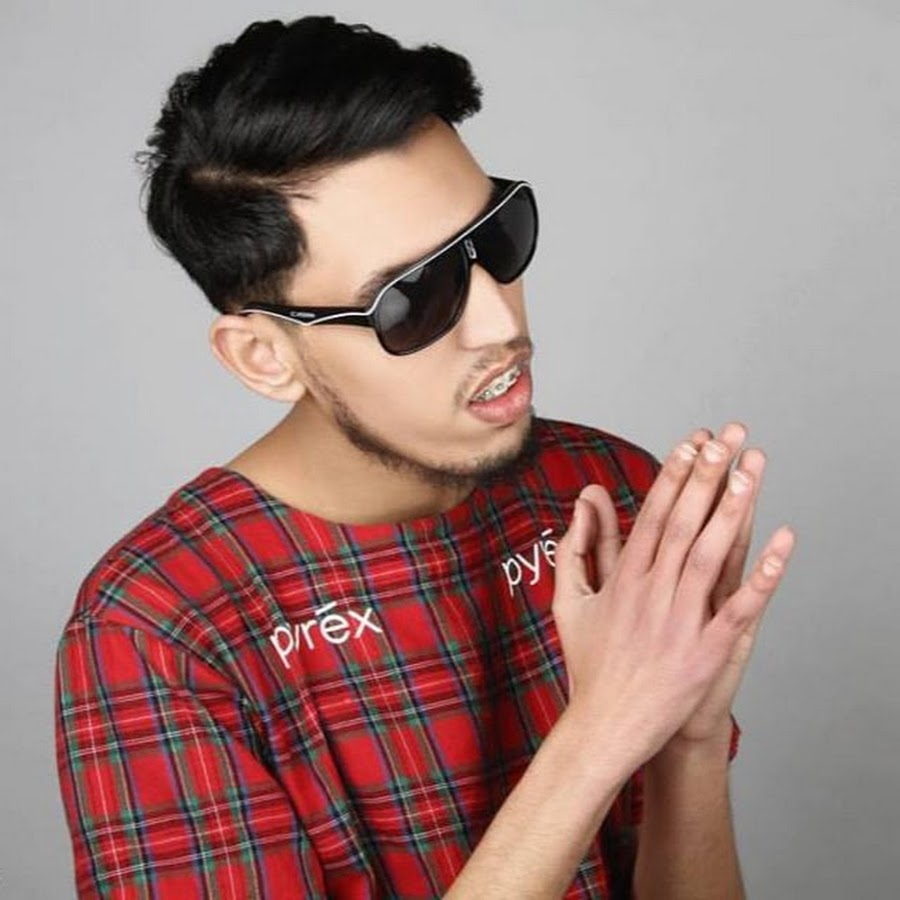
- Anoghan posing for his single's art work "Walou"

Background information
- Born: Anouar ELGhannam; July 6, 1990 (age 35); Casablanca, Morocco
- Genres: Moroccan, R&B, pop, Moroccan pop, rap
- Occupations: Singer, songwriter, producer
- Years active: 2006–present
- Labels: Africa Records

Anouar EL Ghannam (born July 6, 1990), known by his stage name AnoGhan, is a Moroccan singer-songwriter. He is one of the first artists to sing Moroccan R&B and pop inspired by American artists such as Ne-Yo, Usher and Chris Brown.

== Biography ==
El Ghannam, known by his stage name AnoGhan, was born July 6, 1990, in Casablanca, Morocco. His music is a mixture of American style and Moroccan lyrics. AnoGhan's first song "A'alach" released in 2006. He released "Nbghiik" in 2009. He returned to the music scene on June 2, 2011, with a Moroccan R&B album Be3d fra9. After a long absence, AnoGhan returned with a single in October 2012 titled "Hassi Biya" changing his genre from R&B to Pop/Dance.

AnoGhan stopped all his musical activities until the beginning of the year 2018, when he launched a song under the name "Visa", the song had over 30,000 views in 24 hours.

== Discography ==
=== Albums ===
- Ba3d L'fra9 (2011)

=== Singles ===
- "A'alach" (2006)
- "Nbghiik" (2009)
- "Ghadara" (2010)
- "Happy New Year Feat SevenProd AllStars" (2010)
- "Hassi Biya" (2012)
- "Walou" (2016)
- "Visa feat. Oussama Ghannam" (2018)
