= Mr Sufian =

Moroccan pop and R&B singer (born 1994)

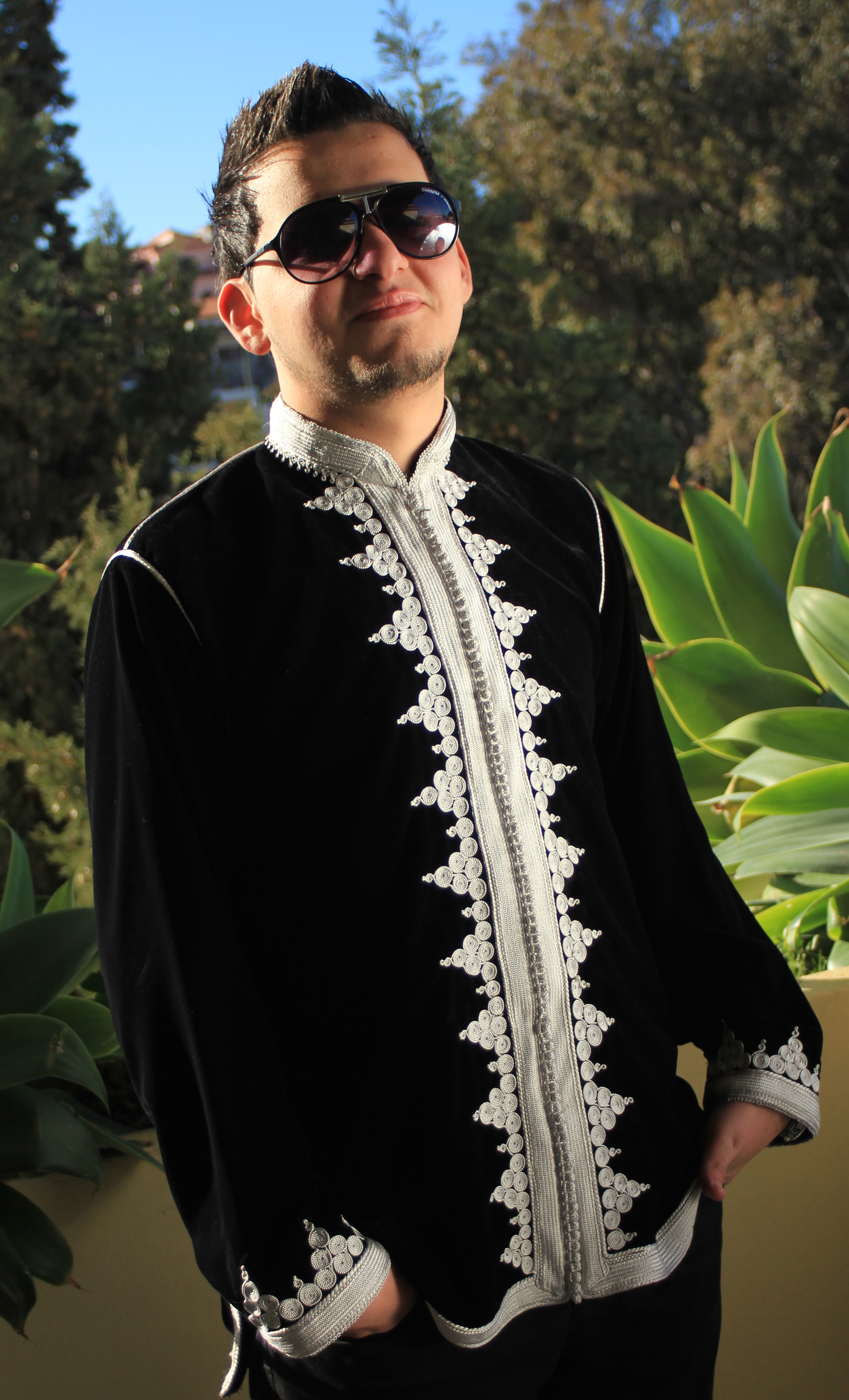
- Mr Sufian

Background information
- Born: Rabat, Morocco
- Genres: Moroccan pop, R&B, pop
- Occupations: Singer, songwriter
- Years active: 2009–present
- Label: Yala Music
- Website: mrsufian.org

Mr Sufian is a Moroccan pop and R&B singer and songwriter from Tangier.

== Biography ==
As a kid coming from Tangier, one of the few cities in Morocco that accepted the "Musiqa Ashabab," which means Music of Youth, the young singer was interested in occidental music and especially in R&B and pop music. He is influenced by American artists like Chris Brown, Usher and others.

He started his career in 2010, with his debut single "Awel Hob", which it had a good impression by his fans and gained the top of the classment in "Reverbantion – Top R&B aux Maroc". In 2011 he released his 5th single "Smaheli Bezaf" with a music video. He is one of the few artists that are influenced by the American music style. He is the first Moroccan artist who got signed by Vevo & Sony Music. He has made the first Moroccan Dubstep song and his debut album is already available on stores all around the world.

== Discography ==
=== Albums ===
- 2013: Awel Hob

=== Singles ===
2010

- Awel Hob
- Dayman F’Bali

2011

- Ana Wiyak
- Smahli Bezaf
- 3ayesh Ghrib

2012

- Joj F’Had Dnya
- A’ish Hyatek
- Beslama
- Sehrouni Ayounek

2013

- Mazal Liyam
- 3mel Lkhir (Ft. Amir L9wafi)

== Music videos ==
- Smahli Bezaf (2011)
- Awel Hob (2012)
- Mazal Liyam (2013)
