= Water for Life =

2006 concert by Jean-Michel Jarre

"Water for Life" was a concert given by French electronic musician Jean Michel Jarre on the night of December 16, 2006 amidst the dunes of the Sahara desert at Merzouga, Morocco. The concert was held under the auspice of UNESCO as 2006 had been designated the International Year of Deserts and Desertification by the United Nations General Assembly.

The free 2h25m concert, sponsored by the Kingdom of Morocco, was attended by an estimated 10–15,000 spectators. It was filmed in high-definition TV and broadcast live by the public Moroccan TV station (channels RTM1 and TVM International) and by Almaghribya TV. A one-hour edit was produced for sale to TV stations.

A souvenir 172-page hardback book entitled "The Making of Water for Life" was published in 2007 which documented how the concert was staged in detail.

== Stage ==
The stage featured a collection of nine 4-by-10-metre vertical screens (similar to those in the 1993 Europe in Concert tour), described as "doors to the desert". On them were projected images - static and animated -, as in a typical Jarre concert. Behind the stage, the desert dunes were lit, and fireworks were shot behind and around the stage.

Two general rehearsals were held, on the previous night and on the evening of the day of the concert, complete with fireworks. Like Jarre's previous concert, Space of Freedom, they were filmed to get additional coverage for a post-live edit; the rehearsals were also filmed to prevent any bad weather during the live concert preventing its release on video, as had happened before with The Twelve Dreams of the Sun (1999–2000) and Aero - Tribute to the Wind (2002).

During rehearsals, a balloon with an internal projector was placed on center stage, but it did not appear in the concert itself.

== Track listing ==
1. "Intro Saturée" - 3'50
2. "Suite for Flute"
3. "Oxygene 2"
4. "Miss Moon"
5. "Oxygene 7"
6. "Space of Freedom" (originally "March 23")
7. "Chronologie 6"
8. "Millions of Stars"
9. "Oxygene 4"
10. "Education" (originally "Revolution, Revolutions", with new lyrics)
11. "Gagarin" (originally Hey Gagarin)
12. "Light My Sky" (originally "Tout Est Bleu", with new lyrics)
13. "Oxygene 12"
14. "Chronologie 2"
15. "C'est la Vie"
16. "Theremin Memories"
17. "Souvenir of China"
18. "UNESCO Theme" (originally "Eldorado")
19. "Rendez-Vous 4"
20. "Rendez-Vous 2"

"Intro Saturée" was premiered at this concert, loosely based on "Melancholic Rodeo", a track from his then forthcoming Téo & Téa album. Of all the retitled tracks and new lyrics (from their original recordings), only the lyrics for "Education" were premiered at this concert. "Suite for Flute" had been previously performed as the intro of "Oxygene 2".

== Personnel ==
- Jean Michel Jarre: bass guitar, cymbals, Dynacord, Eminent, Laser Harp, Midi flute, music box, Roland AX-1, Theremin
- Francis Rimbert: Fantom, Roland JD800, Roland S760
- Claude Samard: musical director, guitar, keyboards
- Morocco Philharmonic Orchestra
- Casablanca Orchestra of Arabic Modern Music
- Alizées Choir
- Gnawa Maaster Hamid Elikasri and his Band
- B'net from Marrakesh
- Charaf and Dansers
- Hadji Younes (luth)
- Abdellah El Miry (violin)
- Saida Charaf (vocals)
- Ahmed Alaoui (vocals)

== Sources ==
- Jarre UK
- Francis Rimbert Official Forum
