= Entertainment 2.0 =

Single by Sean Paul featuring Juicy J, 2 Chainz and Nicki Minaj

from the album Full Frequency
- Released: 10 October 2013
- Recorded: 2012/13
- Length: 4:22
- Label: Atlantic Records
- Songwriters: Tauheed Epps; Brandon Green; Sean Paul Henriques; Jordan Houston; Ronald Ferebee Jr; Onika Maraj; Tony Scales; Jovan Williams
- Producers: Maejor Ali; SixOne; Young Yonny; Chef Tone

Sean Paul singles chronology
| "Other Side of Love" (2013) | "Entertainment 2.0" (2013) | "Turn It Up" (2013) |

"Entertainment 2.0" is a song by Jamaican dancehall recording artist Sean Paul, featuring vocals from Juicy J, 2 Chainz and Nicki Minaj. The song was released as a digital download on 10 October 2013 through Atlantic Records as the second single from his sixth studio album Full Frequency (2014).

== Chart performance ==
| Chart (2013) | Peak position |
|---|---|
| Canada Hot 100 (Billboard) | 94 |

== Release history ==
| Region | Date | Format | Label |
|---|---|---|---|
| United States | 10 October 2013 | Digital download | Atlantic Records |
