= Rebel Spirit (artist) =

- Born: March 24, 1989 (age 37)

Mohammed Amine El Bellaoui (محمد أمين البلاوي), known as Rebel Spirit, is a Moroccan comic book author, illustrator, street artist, and musician from Casablanca, Morocco. He came out of Casablanca's underground art scene and gained notoriety with the release of his comic book in the Darija—or vernacular Arabic—of Casablanca, entitled the Casablanca Guide (الدليل البيضاوي, Le Guide Casablancais). He is considered a prominent member of the contemporary art and culture scene in Casablanca and in Morocco.

== Life ==
He was born in Casablanca on March 24, 1989. He studied comic book writing at Casablanca's Upper School of Fine Arts. He supports the Raja Casablanca soccer club.

== Career ==
=== Casablanca Guide ===
Casablanca Guide, a comic book containing stories about life in Casablanca, was published January 2015. The comic is written in Casablanca's version of Darija, Moroccan vernacular Arabic, and translated into French as well. This work was exhibited at the French Institute of Casablanca January 2015.

A sequel entitled From Casa, With Love was published November 3, 2017.

=== Other projects ===
Rebel Spirit participates in many other artistic projects. For example, he designed the cover of Hoba Hoba Spirit's album As It Should (كما ينبغي). He also worked on a comic book with the city government of Casablanca to spread civic principles.

His band, Moustach Orchestra, was founded in 2018. It draws inspiration from and pays tribute to Moroccan chaabi music of the 70's, 80's, and 90's.
