= Hoba Hoba Spirit =

Moroccan fusion and rock band

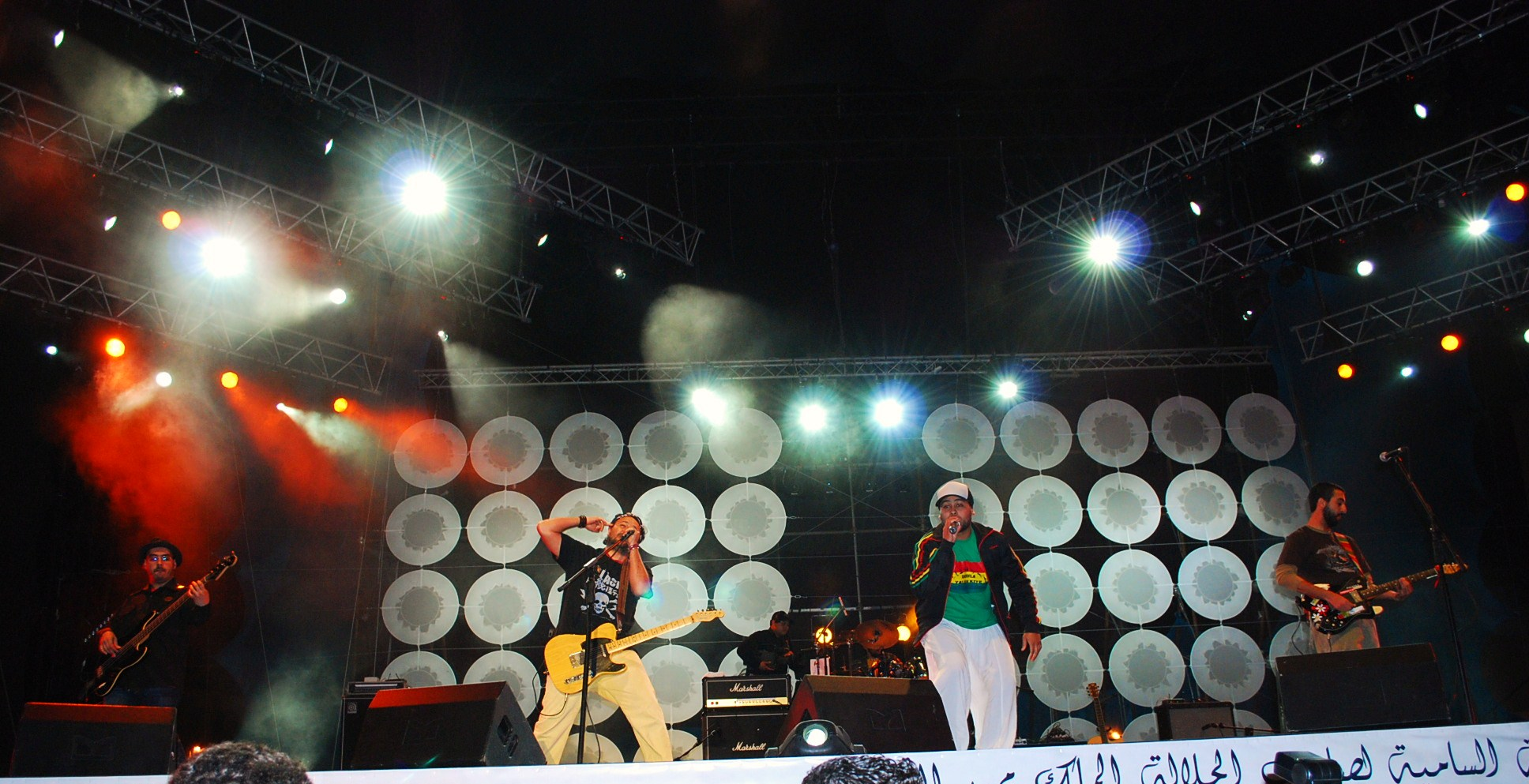

Background information
- Origin: Casablanca, Morocco
- Genres: Gnawa, rock, punk rock, reggae
- Years active: 1998–present
- Labels: Hayha Music Division; Hot Lunch Records
- Members: Reda Allali (lead vocals/guitar); Anouar Zehouani (vocals/guitar); Adil Hanine (drums); Saad Bouidi (bass); Othmane Hmimar (vocals/percussion); Abssamad Bourhim (backline/guitar)
- Past members: Mohamed Laâbidi
- Website: Official website

Hoba Hoba Spirit is a Moroccan fusion and rock band formed in Casablanca in 1998. It is composed of Adil Hanine (drummer), Anouar Zehouani (guitarist), Saâd Bouidi (Bass guitar), Reda Allali (vocalist and guitarist), Othmane Hmimar (percussionist) and Philippe Laffont (trumpeter). The name of the group is based on a song by Bob Marley.

Hoba Hoba Spirit's musical style mixes rock, reggae and gnawa with little pinches of hard rock. They refer to their music as "hayha," meaning chaos, randomness and just pure vibes. Their lyrics are mostly in Darija (Moroccan dialect), French and sometimes English. Recurring themes in their songs are the disorientation and confusion of young Moroccans either politically, socially or interpersonally.

A notable duo of Hoba Hoba Spirit was with Moroccan rapper Bigg in a single called "Goulou Bazz", which was a huge success. The single is included in the album Trabando (2007).

Since 2003, the band has emerged as one of the most popular rock acts in Morocco, frequently playing the country's major festivals, such as the Mawazine Festival in Rabat, L'Boulevard Tremplin in Casablanca, Timitar Festival in Agadir, and the Gnaoua and World Music Festival in Essaouira.

During the 2007 Maghreb Music Award, Hoba Hoba Spirit won three awards in the categories of "best fusion artist, best album for Trabando, and best title for the song "Fhamator."

== Discography ==
- Hoba Hoba Spirit (2003)
1. Casa
2. Soudani
3. Maricane
4. Gnawa Blues
5. Fine Ghadi Biya
6. Basta Lahya
7. La tele
8. La'hrig
- Blad Skizo (2005)
1. Jamal
2. Blad Schizo
3. Chalala...
4. Ma Ajebtinich
5. El Kelb
6. Aourioura
7. El Caïd Mötorhead
8. Seddina (wa choukrane)
- Trabando (2007)
1. Hoba's Back
2. Intikhabat
3. Fhamatôr
4. Kalakh
5. Baz feat. Bigg
6. Maradona
7. Zerda
8. Tiqar
9. Marock'n Roll II
10. Miloudi
11. Trabando
12. Super Caïd
- El Gouddam (2008)
1. Radio Hoba
2. Hyati
3. Wakel Chareb Na3ess feat. Stati
4. Jdoudna kanou shah
5. 60%
6. Rabe3a
7. Femme Actuelle
8. Arnaque mondiale
9. El Gouddam
10. Spoutnik
- Nefs & Niya (2010)
1. Bab Sebta
2. Les Anesthésistes
3. Dark Bendir Army
4. Terrorist
5. Black Moussiba
6. Fawda
7. Al Qanat Assaghira
8. The Debil
9. Happy Hour
10. Qadi Hajto
11. Nefs & Niya
- Kalakhnikov (2013)
1. Kalakhnikov
2. Sidi Bouzekri
3. Grimma Awards
4. Ketama Airways
5. Khoroto driver
6. Abdelkader
7. Kerch power
8. Heroes
9. La ra7ma la chfa9a
10. La volonté de vivre
- Kamayanbaghi (2018) The cover art of this album was designed by Rebel Spirit.
1. Tri9i
2. Moulay Tahar
3. Le Maroc
4. Fitna
5. Dégoutage
6. Décalage
7. Mchat 3lia
8. Zerbana
9. La logique
10. Nabil Lhbil
11. L'b7ar
12. Jnouni

== See also ==
- Music of Morocco
- List of rock genres
- Fnaire (group)
