= Douzi =

Moroccan singer (born 1985)

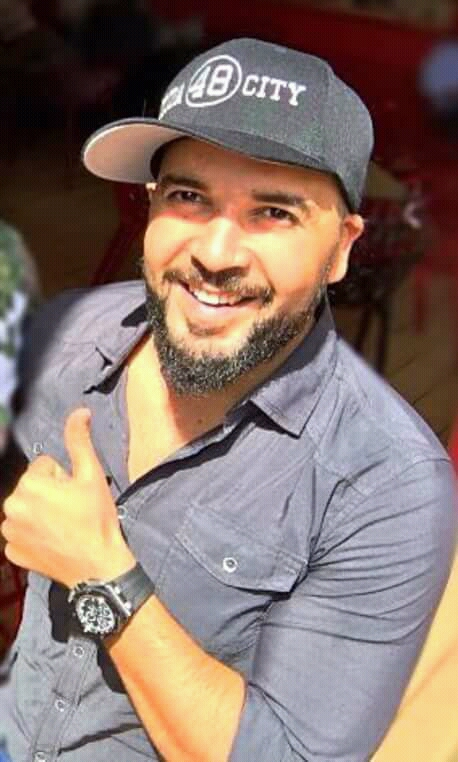
- Douzi in 2017

Background information
- Born: Abdelhafid Douzi; 30 April 1985 (age 41); Oujda, Morocco
- Genres: Moroccan pop; pop; Arabic music
- Occupation: Singer
- Instrument: Vocals
- Years active: 1994–present
- Label: Douzi Production
- Website: douzi.net

Abdelhafid Douzi (Arabic: عبد الحفيظ الدوزي; born 30 April 1985), better known by the mononym Douzi, is a Moroccan pop singer.

== Career ==
Douzi began his career at a young age, appearing on Moroccan television with the song "La Lil Harb" (Arabic: لا للحرب), composed by his brother and manager, Kader Douzi. In 1993, he took part in the Youth Festival, organized by a radio station in Oujda, becoming the youngest participant that year. In 1994, he recorded his first album, Goulou Imumti Tjini, and in 1997, he released his first music video, "Rwahi Liya". In 2004, his song "Yali Nassini" became a radio hit, and he was invited to record a track for the compilation Rai n' B Fever 2 on Columbia/Sony BMG. In 2008, Douzi launched the label Linatop Production and went on tour to promote his new studio album, 100% Douzi. He has since published several more records, including a greatest hits compilation, and a string of singles, including "Laayoun Ainiya", "Douni Lebladi", "Lmouja", and "Dina".

In August 2016, Douzi was decorated with the Moroccan national order of merit (Ouissam Al Moukafâa Al Wataniya) by King Mohammed VI. In November 2017, he was the winner of DAF BAMA 2017 in Hamburg, for Best Moroccan Singer.

Douzi has performed at various international festivals, including Mawazine. He sings in Arabic, French, and English, and occasionally other languages, such as Spanish, Hindi, and Turkish.

Douzi was one of the singers that took part in the 2022 FIFA Club World Cup official song, entitled "Welcome to Morocco",

== Discography ==
Studio albums

- Goulou Imumti Tjini (1994)
- Mani Zaafan
- Sultana
- 100% Douzi (2008)
- Hayati (2013)
- My Life (2018)

Compilations

- Greatest Hits (2018)

Singles

- "Rwahi Liya" (1997)
- "Yali Nassini" (2004)
- "Ana Maghrabi" feat. Appa (2009)
- "Maryama" (2010)
- "Laayoun Ainiya" (2010)
- "Fehmini" (2013)
- "Douni Lebladi" (2015)
- "Mazal Mazal" (2016)
- "Lmouja" (2017)
- "Awal Hob" feat. Dj Maze (2017)
- "Mina" (2017)
- "Mabrouk Rebha" (2018)
- "Amar" (2018)
- "Bikhtissar" (2019)
- "Khalik Maaya" (2020)
- "Kolchi belmouktab" (2024)
- "Ach Hada" (2025)
- "Marhaban Ya Ramadan" (2025)

Featured in

- "Radio" (Tubelight featuring Douzi – 2017)
- "Colors" (Jason Derulo featuring Douzi – 2018)
