= Mouss Maher =

- مهراوي المصطفى
- Born: Mahraoui El Mustapha; 11 February 1973 (age 53); Ahfir, Morocco
- Spouse: Khadija Mhanna
- Children: 2
- Musical career
- Genres: Raï, Moroccan Chaabi
- Occupations: Singer, Musician
- Years active: 1986–present

Mahraoui El Mustapha, known professionally as Mouss Maher, is a Moroccan Raï singer and musician.

== Early life ==
Mouss Maher was born on 11 February 1973 in Ahfir, Morocco. He emigrated to France during the 1990s where he worked as a hairdresser to support himself while working on his debut album.

== Career ==
Mouss first appeared in 1986 performing in La foire a common place for partying in Oujda back then. Then, he appeared in Sibaq Al Mudunn, a popular TV program that featured inter-cities singing competitions across Morocco, representing the city of Berkane.

Mouss then moved to Paris and released his debut album in 1999, under the stage name Maher, which wasn't a success.

In 2015, his song Lhmak hmaki gained traction among listeners in the Maghreb and among the North African diaspora in France.

Locally, he performed in festivals such as Mawazine, The Sefrou Cherry Festival, The Jawhara Festival, and The Moussem Moulay Abdellah Amghar Festival. Outside Morocco, he held concerts in France and the US.

He founded a Raï band named Dallas Music.

In 2021, he had his first acting experience in a Sitcom titled Kolna Mgharba broadcast by the Moroccan second channel 2M during the month of Ramadan.

== Personal life ==
He is married to Khadija Mhanna, a businesswoman and artist manager who represents many Moroccan musicians in Europe. He has a son and a daughter.

Beyond his career in music, he owns a hairdressing salon in Paris, and a hookah lounge in Casablanca.

== Discography ==
=== Singles ===
- "Khalouni" (2021)
- "Mani fahem walou" (2020)
- "Mocha3widin" (2020)
- "Adn" (2020)
- "Beslma" Feat Chebba Dalila (2020)
- "Fi bladi delmouni" (2019)
- "Bomba" Feat Vanny Jordan 2019)
- "7atou alina" Feat Mohamed Benchenet 2019)
- "Corazon" (2018)
- "Chocolat" (2018)
- "Calma" (2018)
- "Lharba" (2017)
- "Dagdaga" (2017)
- "Tbadel aliya" (2016)
- "Rojola" Feat 2gunz (2016)
- "Kanet ma faute" (2015)
- "Dourto alina" Feat Zina Daoudia (2015)
- "Drebni ya khoubzi" Feat Adil Miloudi (2015)
- "Dirou kifna" Feat Adil Miloudi (2015)
- "Anmou alik" Feat Zina Daoudia (2014)
- "Hazzi rassek" (2013)
- "Mamamiya" Feat Zina Daoudia (2013)
- "C'est bon" (2012)
- "Ti amo" (2011)
- "Babini" (2011)
- "miliard chinwi" (2010)
- "lahmak hmaki" (2008)

=== Albums ===
- "Doug el mahraz" (2007)
- "Lhmak Hmaki" (2008)
- "Zanga zanga" feat Reda Taliani (2011)
- "Lhawana" (2012)
- "Laghram" (2012)
- "Nmout A'alik" feat Zina Addaoudia (2013)
- "Bara bara" (2014)

== See also ==
- Mimoun El Oujdi
- Cheb Kader
- Reda Taliani
