= Lbenj =

Moroccan rapper & singer (born 1993)

- Also known as: Lbenj
- Born: Zakaria Bennaji; 15 May 1993 (age 33); Casablanca
- Genres: Pop; rap
- Years active: 2014–present

Zakaria Ben Naji (Arabic: زكرياء بن الناجي, born 15 March 1993), better known by his stage name Lbenj, is a Moroccan singer and rapper from Casablanca.

== Biography ==
He took his first steps in rap, writing songs during his period of convalescence after a motorcycle accident in 2014.

Lbenj first received attention after releasing "T-Max 530" ft Maes in May 2016. The single reached 10 million views on YouTube.

He then released several successive songs, including: "Nari Nari", "SKR", "1000cc", and "Zakaria".

In 2017, he released "Single", a song from his album Galaxy. The single garnered him a Moroccan Music Award nomination. Nominations are based on broadcasts on the top Moroccan radio stations (Chada FM, Hit Radio and Radio 2M).

In January 2018, he revealed "Noir et Blanc", receiving more than 3 million views on YouTube in less than 3 weeks.

In 2019, Lbenj performed at the Mawazine Festival and was nominated for Best African Act in the Diaspora All Africa Music Award. Don Bigg released the song 170 KG disparaging Lbenj and other young Moroccan hip hop artists.

As of March 2019, his YouTube channel reached 1 million subscribers. According to Haartez, Lbenj is one of the "hottest artists in Morocco and across the Arab world" and "at the top of the charts in many Arab countries".

== Discography ==
- 2016: "T-Max 530" ft Maes
- 2017: "Galaxy"
- 2018: "Noir Blanc"
- 2018: "Amoureux tombé" feat. Mounim Slimani & DJ Med
- 2019: "Affaires" feat. Vinci
- 2020: "Sbata"
- 2020: "Que Pasa" feat. Ghita Lahmamssi
- 2021: "Galoli" feat. Chaimaa Jahid
- 2023: "KIF KIF"
- 2024: "HWASI"
