= Ihab Amir =

Moroccan singer (born 1995)

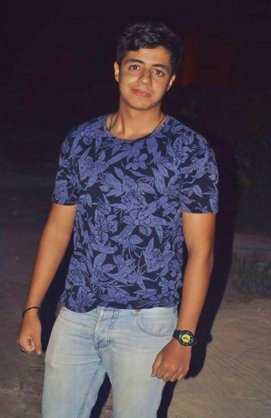
- Born: 14 May 1995 (age 31); Safi
- Citizenship: Morocco
- Occupations: Artist, Songwriter, Actor, Singer

Ihab Amir (Arabic:إيهاب أمير, born 14 May 1995, in Safi), is a Moroccan singer, songwriter, composer and actor. He rose to popularity as a contestant in the 11th season of Star Academy Arab World. He made his commercial singing debut with two songs, "Nta li Bditi" (Arabic: نتا لي بديتي) and "Taali Lia" (Arabic: تعالي ليا), in July 2015.

== Star Academy 11 ==
Amir competed in the 11th season of Star Academy Arab World. He was the second Moroccan male ever to be accepted on to the show. Ihab won people's hearts from the get go, mainly due to his pride in showcasing the Moroccan dialect with the other candidates, his decent character and his multi-talent. Amir was never named by any of the show's judges for nomination up until the week of his exit when he was finally named a nominee. Amir was nominated only once on the show. During this nomination he was shown to have lost the public vote, which raised allegations that the show tampered with the results. Fans of Amir expressed their outrage through social media 1 January 2016.

=== Performances in Star Academy 11 ===
- 1st Prime : Ibaat li Gawab – Sabah Fakhri
- 2nd Prime : Nawiha – Mohamed Hamaki
- 3rd Prime : Mal Habibi malo – Saad Lamjarred
- 4th Prime : Lemen Nechki Hali – Saad Lamjarred
- 5th Prime : Min ghir lih – Mohammed Abdel Wahab
- 6th Prime : Houbi al anani – Marwan Khoury
- 7th Prime : We marret el ayam – Umm Kulthum
- 8th Prime : Abdel kader – khaled
- 9th Prime : Ya zahratan fi khayali _ Farid al-Atrash
- 10th Prime : Baathe lak ya Habib roh – Fairuz
- 11th Prime : babouri rayh rayh – Ilham al-Madfai
- 12th Prime : Ana Benseheb – Wael Jassar
- 16th Prime (The final) : Enty Saad Lamjarred

== Return to Morocco ==
After Ihab Amir's exclusion from the show, his fans welcomed him in the airport of Casablanca, though it was a shock for the Moroccans and the Arabs to see fans in the airport for a candidate that was excluded from the show on his first nomination. On his arrival to Morocco, the fans also welcomed him in his city Safi and fans from other countries watched on Periscope. Due to his quick rise to fame, many radio and TV channels invited Ihab for interviews including Hit Radio, Chada FM, 2M and Medi 1 TV.

== His career after the academy ==
Awards

- MEMA encouragement award (2016)
- Dear guest best rising singer (2016)
- Happa African award best youth singer north Africa (2017)
- Morocco music awards (2017)
- Afrimma best singer north Africa (2018)
- Arabsat festival best youth Arab singer (2019)
- Casa arts best Moroccan youth singer (2020)
- Arabsat festival best youth Arab singer (2020)
- Arabsat festival best youth Arab singer (2021)

Discography

1.	TAALI LIYA	2015
2.	NTA LI BDITI	2015
3.	MADARNA WALO	2016
4.	CÉLIBATAIRE	2016
5.	2KELMAT	2017
6.	HBIBI HJARNI WRAH	2017
7.	WEHDA WEHDA ALIA	2017
8.	LIMA3NDOUCH (feat. DJ SOUL A)	2018
9.	Trop mimi (ft djkayz&mr jeant)	2018
10.	BGHIT NTIR YAMMA (feat. ROUNEE)	2018
11.	TWAHACHTEK	2019
12.	MCHA L'AMOUR	2019
13.	Domoo warda	2019
14.	Mallina (feat. 7TOUN)	2020
15.	LMERYOULA (feat. Don Bigg)	2020
16.	Chebba	2020
17.	Hikayat	2021
18.	Ser kedim	2021
19.	Cay'est	2022
20.	Yastahel	2023
21.	Basta	2024

Other

Nedmana-dunia batma(2019)/composer and songwriter

"Al atfal naema operet"(2019)/participation as a singer

Acting career

_Badr in TV series"ser kedim" (2021)

-Rida in TV series "alhan al mady " (2025)
