= Oussama Housne =

Moroccan human rights activist

- اسامة حسني
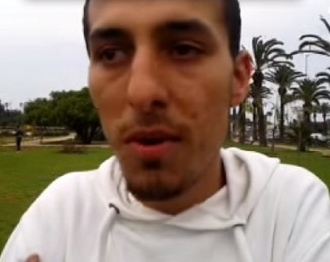
- Born: 1993

Oussama Housne (Arabic: اسامة حسني; – born 1993) is a Moroccan human rights activist associated with the Moroccan Association of Human Rights; he rose to prominence when he was imprisoned for two crimes: false reporting to the police, and insulting the integrity of state police.

On June 1, 2014, Moroccan police arrested Oussama, stating that he "invented everything and had nothing of substance." The Moroccan Association of Human Rights contested this formally and claimed "At his trial, the defense clearly noted that the prosecutor's version was ambiguous." However Amnesty International expressed concern that an arrest was made under laws that suppress freedom of dissent.

There is an ongoing Amnesty International campaign calling for Housne's release along with the release of Wafae Charaf, another young Moroccan human rights activist who was convicted for "falsely reporting" torture and for slandering Morocco's police force.

== See also ==
- Wafae Charaf
