= Full Frequency =

Studio album by Sean Paul
- Released: 18 February 2014
- Genre: Dancehall pop
- Length: 49:37
- Label: Dutty Rock; IC; VP; Atlantic
- Producer: Philip "Hardwork" Constable; Stargate; The Cataracs; Chef Tone; Benny Blanco; Giorgio Tuinfort; Polow da Don; Toby Gad; GoonRock; Akon; Fernando Garibay; Maejor Ali

Sean Paul chronology
Tomahawk Technique (2012)	Full Frequency (2014)	Mad Love the Prequel (2018)

Singles from Full Frequency
- 1. "Other Side of Love" Released: 10 September 2013; 2. "Entertainment 2.0" Released: 10 October 2013; 3. "Turn It Up" Released: 30 October 2013; 4. "Want Dem All" Released: 15 November 2013

Professional ratings
Review scores
Source	Rating
Allmusic	3.5/5 stars

Full Frequency is the sixth studio album by Jamaican dancehall musician Sean Paul, released through Dutty Rock Productions, IC Records, VP Records, and Atlantic Records. The album was originally planned for release on 4 November 2013, but was later pushed back to a release date of 18 February 2014.

Boasting a blend of dancehall, hip hop and pop styles, the album features guest appearances from Damian Marley, Iggy Azalea, Nyla Of Brick & Lace, Konshens, Nicki Minaj, 2 Chainz, Juicy J and writing from MNDR.

The album debuted at number one on the Billboard Reggae Albums chart and was nominated at the 57th Annual Grammy Awards for Best Reggae Album.

This was the final album for Sean Paul under Atlantic Records before his departure to Universal's Island Records.

== Singles ==
- The first single off the album "Other Side of Love" was released to iTunes on 10 September 2013. Its official music video was released on 31 July 2013.
- The second single "Entertainment" which features 2 Chainz and Juicy J was released on 25 June 2013. Sean released an official remix for "Entertainment" on 10 October 2013 with an additional feature from Nicki Minaj.
- "Turn It Up" was released as a single in the UK on 30 October 2013. It will be released in Germany on 22 November 2013.
- "Want Dem All" was released as a single in the U.S. on 15 November 2013.

== Track listing ==
No.	Title	Writer(s)	Producer(s)	Length
1.	"Riot" (featuring Damian Marley)	Johnny Clarke, Philip "Hardwork" Constable, Sean Paul Henriques, Bunny Lee, Damian "Junior Gong" Marley	Philip Hardwork Constable	3:18
2.	"Entertainment 2.0" (featuring Juicy J, 2 Chainz and Nicki Minaj)	Tauheed Epps, Brandon Green, Sean Paul Henriques, Jordan Houston, Ronald Ferebee Jr, Onika Maraj, Tony Scales, Jovan Williams	Maejor Ali, SixOne, Young Yonny, Chef Tone	4:23
3.	"Pornstar" (featuring Nyla of Brick and Lace)	Philip "Hardwork" Constable, Toby Gad, Maddison Grey, Sean Paul Henriques	Toby Gad, Hardwork	3:21
4.	"Want Dem All" (featuring Konshens)	Sean Paul Henriques, Niles Hollowell-Dhar, Benjamin Levin, Garfield Spence	Benny Blanco, The Cataracs	3:19
5.	"Hey Baby"	Toby Gad, Wayne Hector, Sean Paul Henriques	Toby Gad, Hardwork	3:08
6.	"Wickedest Style" (featuring Iggy Azalea)	Jason "Jigzagula" Henriques, Sean Paul Henriques, James Foye III, Jamal Jones, Amethyst Kelly	Polow da Don	3:52
7.	"Dangerous Ground" (featuring Prince Royce)	Jeremiah Bethea, Philip "Hardwork" Constable, Jason "Jigzagula" Henriques, Sean Paul Henriques, Geoffrey "Royce" Rojas	Hardwork	3:48
8.	"It's Your Life"	Ester Dean, Mikkel S. Eriksen, Jason "Jigzagula" Henriques, Sean Paul Henriques, Tor Erik Hermansen, Ricardo Johnson	StarGate	3:48
9.	"Take It Low"	Shaun Anderson, Nicholas Bennett, Jason "Jigzagula" Henriques, Sean Paul Henriques	Sean Paul, Jason Jigzag Henriques, Shaun Coppershaun Anderson	3:10
10.	"Anyday"	Donovan "Vendetta" Bennett, Nicholas Bennett, Sean Paul Henriques, Sean Roberts	Don Corleon	3:20
11.	"Lights On"	Jason "Jigzagula" Henriquen, Sean Paul Henriques, Aliaune "Akon" Thiam, Giorgio Tuinfort	Akon, Giorgio Tuinfort	3:23
12.	"Legacy"	Sean Paul, Fernando Garibay, Amanda Warner	Fernando Garibay	3:46
13.	"Other Side of Love"	Sean Paul, Benjamin Levin, Niles Hollowell-Dhar	Benny Blanco, The Cataracs	3:05
14.	"Turn It Up"	Joshua Coleman, Sean Paul Henriques, David Listenbee, Jordan Orvosh	GoonRock, Jordan Orvosh	3:54
Total length:				49:37

== Charts ==
=== Weekly charts ===
Chart (2014)	Peak Position
Austrian Albums (Ö3 Austria)	36
Belgian Albums (Ultratop Flanders)	127
Belgian Albums (Ultratop Wallonia)	72
French Albums (SNEP)	63
German Albums (Offizielle Top 100)	22
Hungarian Albums (MAHASZ)	9
Swiss Albums (Schweizer Hitparade)	7
US Top Reggae Albums (Billboard)	1

=== Year-end charts ===
Chart (2014)	Position
US Top Reggae Albums (Billboard)	12
