= Thiebou Diola =

Thiebou Diola ("C'est Bon") (also spelled Ceebu Diola) is a traditional rice-based dish from the Diola (Jola) ethnic group in the Casamance region of southern Senegal. It is a lesser-known variant of the more widely known Thieboudienne, but with unique ingredients and flavours specific to the Diola culinary tradition.

== See also ==
- List of African dishes
- List of chicken dishes
- List of fish dishes
