= Eneida Marta =

Bissau-Guinean singer

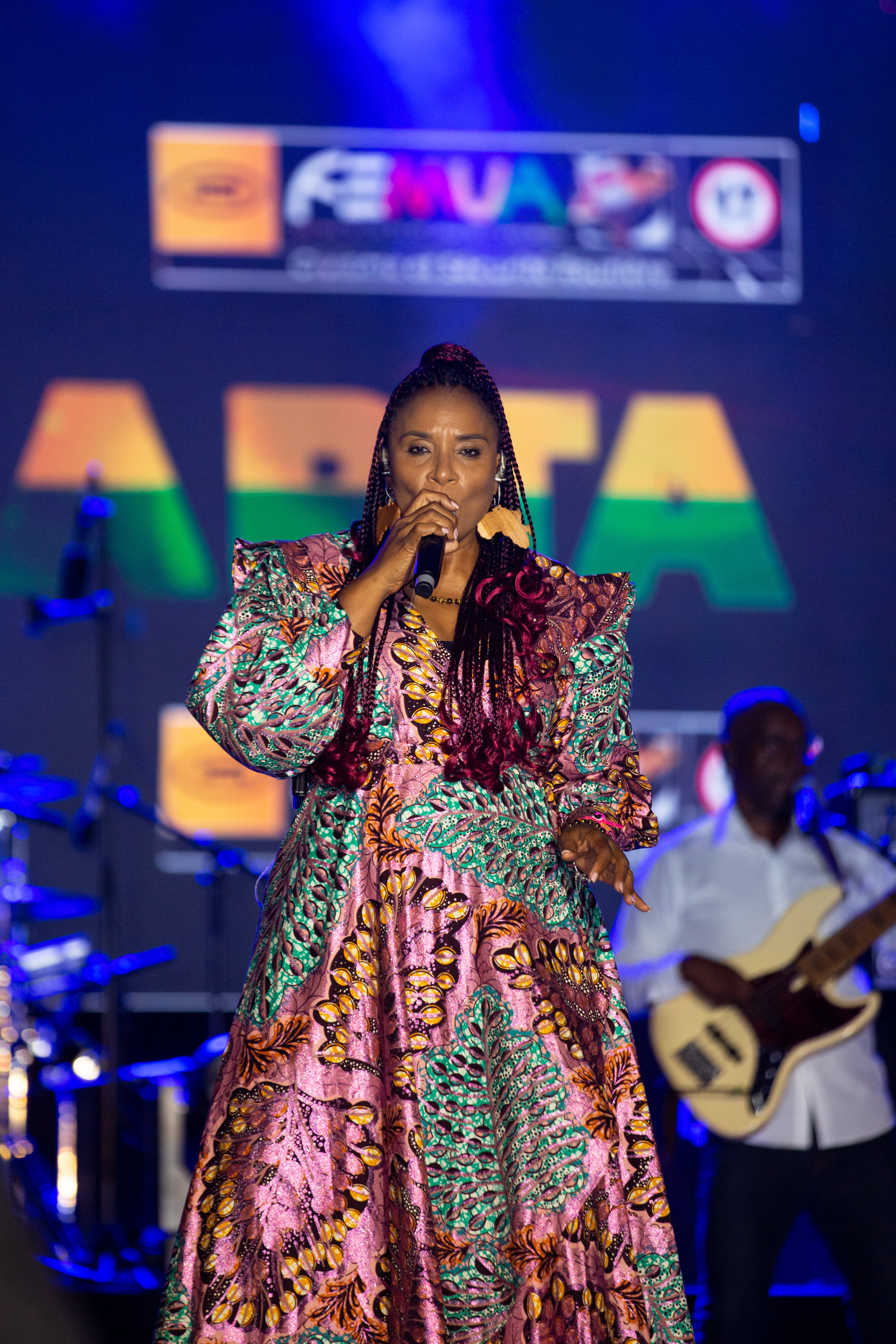
- Eneida Marta in 2025
- Born: Guinea-Bissau
- Occupation: Musician

Eneida Marta is a singer from Guinea-Bissau who sings in Portuguese and Guinea-Bissau Creole. She has toured internationally since the release of her first album in 2001 and was selected to take part in the 2008 World Music Expo (WOMEX). Her most recent album, Family, was released in 2022 and has ranked in the top 20 of the Transglobal World Music Chart.

== Discography ==
- Nô Stória (2001)
- Amari (2002)
- Lôpe Kaï (2006)
- Nha sunhu (2015)
- Ibra (2019)
- Family (2022)
