= Hey Baby (Sean Paul song) =

Single by Sean Paul

from the album Full Frequency
- Released: 21 February 2014
- Recorded: 2012/13
- Length: 3:08
- Label: Atlantic
- Songwriters: Sean Paul Henriques; Wayne Hector; Toby Gad
- Producer: Toby Gad

Sean Paul singles chronology
"Want Dem All" (2013)	"Hey Baby" (2014)	"Come On to Me" (2014)

"Hey Baby" is a song by Jamaican dancehall recording artist Sean Paul. The song was released as a digital download on 21 February 2014 through Atlantic Records as the fifth and final single from his sixth studio album Full Frequency (2014).

== Chart performance ==
Chart (2014)	Peak position
Austria (Ö3 Austria Top 40)	38
Germany (GfK)	47
Switzerland (Schweizer Hitparade)	36

== Release history ==
Region	Date	Format	Label
United States	21 February 2014	Digital download	Atlantic Records
