= Royal Theatre of Rabat =

Performing arts center in Rabat, Morocco

Coordinates: 34°01′32.9″N 6°48′54.7″W

- Théâtre Royal de Rabat

- The Royal Theatre in Rabat in 2023
- Interactive map of Royal Theatre of Rabat
- Former names: Grand Theatre of Rabat
- Address: Bou Regreg; Rabat; Morocco
- Operator: Royal Theatre of Rabat Foundation
- Capacity: 1,821 (main auditorium); 7,000 (outdoor amphitheatre)
- Type: Performing arts center

Construction
- Opened: April 22, 2026
- Cost: Approximately MAD 2 billion
- Architects: Zaha Hadid, Patrik Schumacher
- Structural engineer: AKT II
- Services engineer: Max Fordham

Website
- theatreroyalrabat.ma

The Royal Theatre of Rabat (French: Théâtre Royal de Rabat; Arabic: المسرح الملكي بالرباط), formerly known as the Grand Theatre of Rabat, is a performing arts center in Rabat, the capital of Morocco, located on the left bank of the Bou Regreg river. Designed by Zaha Hadid in collaboration with Zaha Hadid Architects, the building is one of the major cultural and architectural projects developed in Rabat in the 21st century.

The project formed part of the urban development programme Rabat, City of Light, Cultural Capital of Morocco, launched in 2014. The complex comprises a main auditorium, a smaller theatre, an outdoor amphitheatre and supporting spaces for performers and audiences.

Construction was completed in 2021, although the opening of the venue was delayed for several years. The Royal Theatre officially opened to the public on 22 April 2026 with an inaugural performance attended by Princesses Lalla Khadija, Lalla Meryem and Lalla Hasnaa, as well as Brigitte Macron, and featuring Moroccan musicians and performers.

== Design ==
The architectural design of the Royal Theatre reflects several characteristics associated with Zaha Hadid's work, particularly its sweeping curves, fluid forms and sculptural treatment of space. The overall composition draws inspiration from the winding course of the Bou Regreg and incorporates references to Arabic calligraphy and elements of Islamic architecture and Moroccan architectural traditions.

The complex occupies a site of approximately 55,000 m^{2} (590,000 sq ft), while the building itself has a total floor area of approximately 27,000 m^{2} (290,000 sq ft). Its programme includes a main auditorium, a smaller theatre, an outdoor amphitheatre, rehearsal and training spaces, and facilities serving performers and visitors.

The main auditorium has a capacity of 1,821 seats and is designed to accommodate a range of theatrical, musical and other performing arts productions. The smaller theatre provides 170 seats in a seated configuration and can accommodate up to 250 people in a standing configuration.

An outdoor amphitheatre provides seating for approximately 7,000 spectators. It incorporates a permanent stage with a depth of 10 metres, with provision for an additional temporary stage for large-scale performances and events.

The interior of the main auditorium features faceted surfaces that draw on the visual language of Moroccan muqarnas, while the circulation spaces connect the entrance, foyer, performance areas and ancillary facilities through a continuous sequence of interior spaces.

The complexity of the building's curved and doubly curved geometry required extensive use of digital modelling and building information modeling (BIM) throughout the design and construction process. These methods were used to coordinate the architectural, structural and technical components of the project.

The building's exterior consists of complex curved surfaces forming a sculptural envelope around the performance spaces. The structure incorporates reinforced concrete and steel, while sections of the external envelope use glass fiber reinforced concrete (GRC), allowing the construction of the building's complex geometries.

The Royal Theatre was among the last major projects designed by Zaha Hadid before her death in 2016. The project had already been conceived and was under development before her death, with construction continuing thereafter until its completion in 2021.

== History ==
=== Construction ===
Planning for the project began in 2010, when Zaha Hadid's architectural practice was commissioned to develop its design. Construction officially began on 7 October 2014 as part of the wider urban development programme for Rabat.

The building's unconventional geometry, characterised by extensive curved and doubly curved surfaces, required advanced digital design and construction methods. Three-dimensional modelling and BIM were used to coordinate the architectural, structural and engineering elements of the project.

The project experienced delays during construction and was ultimately completed in 2021. Although the building and its principal installations had been completed, its opening was postponed for several years.

The total cost of the project rose from its initial estimates to approximately MAD 2 billion.

=== Opening ===
A formal inauguration ceremony associated with the theatre took place on 29 October 2024 in the presence of Princess Lalla Hasnaa and Brigitte Macron. The venue, however, did not begin regular public performances at that time.

The Royal Theatre opened to the public on 22 April 2026 during an inaugural artistic programme attended by Princesses Lalla Khadija, Lalla Meryem and Lalla Hasnaa, together with Brigitte Macron.

The inaugural programme brought together Moroccan musicians, singers and performers and combined Western classical music with Andalusian classical music and contemporary Moroccan music. The performance involved 76 musicians and 40 vocalists.

The Royal Theatre of Rabat Foundation oversees the institution's management and cultural programming, with Princess Lalla Hasnaa serving as its president. Its board includes Moroccan and international figures from the fields of culture, the arts, business and diplomacy.

== Location ==
The Royal Theatre is located on the left bank of the Bou Regreg river, within the urban area between Rabat and Salé. It is situated near several of Rabat's principal historic and architectural landmarks, including the Hassan Tower and the Mausoleum of Mohammed V, and overlooks the Bou Regreg valley and the Kasbah of the Udayas.

The theatre stands approximately 160 metres east of the Hassan II Bridge and approximately 500 metres east of the Mausoleum of Mohammed V and the Hassan Tower. It is also connected to the principal routes linking central Rabat with the Bou Regreg valley.

The site forms part of the wider redevelopment of the Bou Regreg valley, which has combined infrastructure development with the creation of new public, cultural, recreational and urban spaces on both banks of the river. The theatre is located within an area that also includes major contemporary developments such as the Mohammed VI Tower.

Its position between Rabat's historic cityscape and the newer developments of the Bou Regreg valley places the theatre within one of the principal cultural and urban axes of the capital.

== Notable performances ==
=== Inaugural performance ===
The performance held on 22 April 2026 marked the official artistic opening of the Royal Theatre to the public. The programme combined Western classical music, Andalusian classical music and contemporary Moroccan compositions, performed by Moroccan musicians and artists.

The programme included works by Pyotr Ilyich Tchaikovsky, Georges Bizet and Giuseppe Verdi, alongside performances of Andalusian music and contemporary Moroccan compositions. The performers included oud player Driss El Maloumi, pianist Marouan Benabdellah, singer Ahlem Maamri and Samira Kadiri.

=== Subsequent performances ===
On 20 June 2026, the theatre hosted a concert by Lebanese singer Elissa, among the first major Arab music events held at the venue following its opening.

In June 2026, the theatre also hosted a performance by Egyptian comedian Bassem Youssef, as part of his international tour.

== See also ==
- Mausoleum of Mohammed V
- Mohammed VI Tower
