= Want Dem All =

Single by Sean Paul featuring Konshens

from the album Full Frequency
- Released: 15 November 2013
- Recorded: 2012/13
- Length: 3:18
- Label: Atlantic
- Songwriter(s): Sean Paul Henriques; Niles Hollowell-Dhar; Benjamin Levin; Garfield Spence
- Producer(s): Benny Blanco; The Cataracs

Sean Paul singles chronology
"Turn It Up" (2013)	"Want Dem All" (2013)	"Hey Baby" (2014)

Konshens singles chronology
"Out a Road (Wi Seh)" (2013)	"Want Dem All" (2013)	"Policeman" (2015)

"Want Dem All" is a song by Jamaican dancehall recording artist Sean Paul, featuring vocals from Konshens. The song was released as a digital download in the United States on 15 November 2013 through Atlantic Records as the fourth single from his sixth studio album Full Frequency (2014).

== Chart performance ==
Chart (2014)	Peak position
Austria (Ö3 Austria Top 40)	73
Belgium (Ultratip Bubbling Under Wallonia)	11
Germany (GfK)	70

== Release history ==
Region	Date	Format	Label
United States	15 November 2013	Digital download	Atlantic Records
