= Saida Charaf =

Moroccan singer

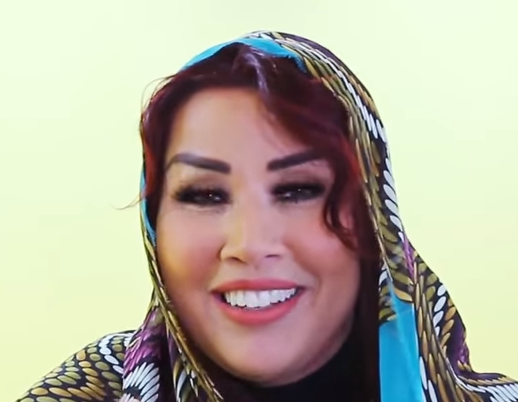
Saida Charaf

Saida Charaf is a famous Moroccan singer.

== Career ==
Saida Charaf was born in Kelâa sraghna in 1970 and moved to Laayoune (morocco) .

In the 1990s, she studied Arabic literature and humanities in Agadir and Rabat to pursue a career in journalism.

She left journalism and started her musical career before travelling to Jordan, Egypt and Lebanon to perform in international festivals and concerts. After her return to Morocco, she has performed on stage with prominent international artistes such as Jean Michel Jarre and Wael Jassar.

2013, she was decorated alongside several artists and athletes by the Moroccan King Mohammed VI.

== Discography ==
- 2016 Album: Wald Mou
- 2013 Album: Amani
- 2006 Album: Notre lune

== Concerts ==
Saida Charaf performed several concerts and in local and international festivals. In December 2008, She performed as a local musician in the Water for Life concert in Merzouga.

She has also performed several time in the national festival Mawazine.

== Personal life ==
Saida Charaf was married three times and has three children. In 2019, she was a victim of online bullying scandal Hamza mon bebe in Morocco.
