= Ibtissam Tiskat =

Moroccan songwriter (born 1992)

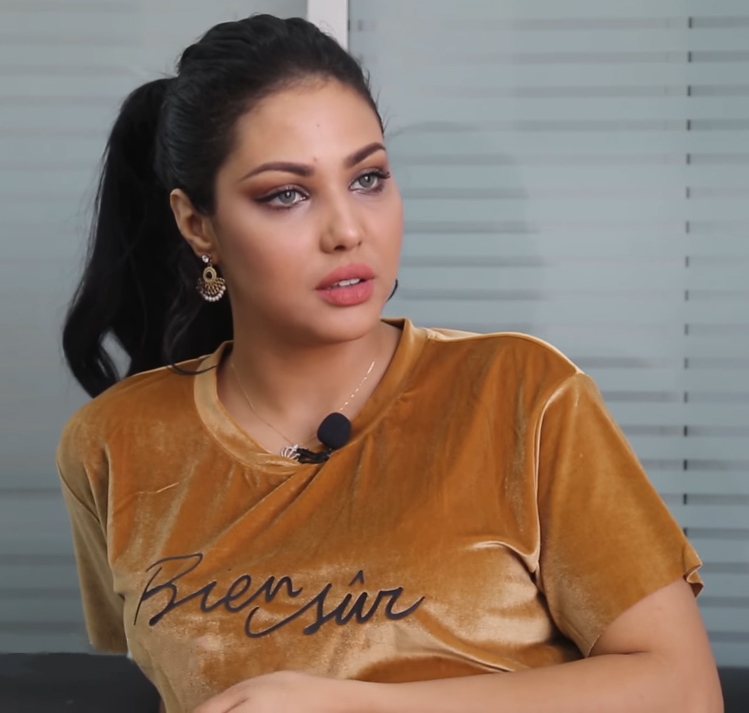
- Tiskat in 2017

Background information
- Born: 3 October 1992 (age 33); Fez, Morocco
- Genres: Arab pop, Arabic music, Moroccan music, Moroccan pop, Middle Eastern music, Khaliji
- Occupation: Singer
- Years active: 2013–present
- Label: Rotana

Ibtissam Tiskat (Arabic: إبتسام تسكات; born 3 October 1992) is a Moroccan singer and actress who rose to popularity as a contestant in both the second season of Arab Idol and the tenth season of Star Academy Arab World. She made her commercial singing debut with "Ndeer Ma bgheet" (Arabic: ندير ما بغيت) in September 2014.

== Career ==
=== Star Academy 10 ===
Tiskat competed in the tenth season of Star Academy where she won the title of 'Miss Star Academy'. Tiskat was nominated twice on the show. For her first nomination she was brought back by public vote, achieving the season's highest vote percentage. During her second nomination, she stood alongside the Tunisian contestant Ghada Jeriedi and lost the public vote, which raised allegations that the show tampered with the results.

=== 2014–present ===
In March 2015, Tiskat released her second single "Maghribiya wa Aftakhir" (Arabic: مغربية وأفتخر). In April 2015, she released a single with Abdel-salam Alzayed, "Enta Ya" (Arabic: أنت يــا). In August 2015, she was a featured vocalist in Two Tone's song "Weli Liya" (Arabic: ولي ليا). In 2016, Tiskat released her first khaliji song " MAFI MEN HABIBI" and won the murex d'or for the best rising star in middle east north Africa region. In December 2016 she released her 5th single "MENEK WLA MENI" in Moroccan dialect which had a big success and became top 1 hit for 4 months on Moroccan radio top chart.

== Awards ==
=== WatsUp TV Africa Music Video Awards ===
Year	Nominee / work	Award	Result
2016	Ma Fi Mn HABIBI	Best North African Video	Won

== Filmography ==
- Bent Nass (2014) (TV Series)
- Allo Ibtissam (2017) (TV Movie)
- Said & Sehtout (2018) (TV Series)
- 30 Million (2020) (Feature Film)
- Hayat (2021-2022) (TV Series)
- Khat Rajaa (2024) (TV Series)
- Bent El Fkeh (2025) (Feature Film)
- Al Aqrab (2026) (TV Movie)

== Discography ==
- Erja3 Lia (2015)
- Ndir Ma Bghit (2016)
- Menak Wela Meni (2016)
- Bghani B3youbi (2017)
- Asher Jarh (2018)
- Galbi Tlef (2019)
- Rajaa Belour (2019)
- Ana Wyah (2020)
- Aliyam (2021)
- Albnat Chofo Zine (2022)
- Bghani B3youbi Solo (2022)
