= Wafae Charaf =

Moroccan human rights activist (born 1988)

Wafae Charaf (Arabic: وفاء شرف, born 1988) is a Moroccan human rights activist. On 21 October 2014, she was sentenced to a two-year prison term for "falsely reporting" torture. She is currently being detained in Tangiers Local Prison.

She reports being abducted and tortured by unknown persons in an unmarked car for several hours after attending a worker's protest on 27 April 2014 in Tangiers. She reported that the men beat her and threatened further violence against her if she did not cease her activism. Thereafter, she was dumped on the side of a road 12 miles outside of Tangiers.

Days later, she filed a complaint with judicial authorities, which prompted the Tangiers judicial police and the National Brigade for the Judicial Police to investigate her complaint. On 8 July 2014, before the investigation had concluded, Charaf was arrested, detained and charged with falsely reporting an offense and slander under Articles 263, 264 and 445 of the Moroccan Penal Code. After more than a month in pre-trial detention, she was convicted on all counts, sentenced to two years in prison for "falsely reporting" torture, and ordered to pay 50,000 MAD in compensation for slandering Morocco's police force. A defense lawyer stated that the court refused to summon key witnesses, and failed to disclose phone tapping evidence which was key to the conviction. Charaf is appealing the conviction.

The International League of Human Rights launched an international appeal for Charaf's release on 19 September 2014. The League denounced the trial, stating that "[t]he trial of Wafaa is a political trial. It shows the complicity between the Moroccan authorities and large industrial groups who want to silence the voice of workers' advocates."

There is an ongoing Amnesty International campaign calling for Charaf's release along with the release of Oussama Housne, another young Moroccan human rights activist who was convicted for "falsely reporting" torture and for slandering Morocco's police force.

== See also ==
- Oussama Housne
