= Other Side of Love =

Single by Sean Paul

Single by Sean Paul

from the album Full Frequency
- Released: 10 September 2013
- Recorded: 2013
- Genre: Electropop, pop rap
- Length: 3:05
- Label: Atlantic
- Songwriter(s): Sean Paul, Benjamin Levin, Niles Hollowell-Dhar
- Producer(s): Benny Blanco, The Cataracs

Sean Paul singles chronology
"What About Us" (2012)	"Other Side of Love" (2013)	"Entertainment 2.0" (2013)

"Other Side of Love" is a song by Jamaican recording artist Sean Paul from his sixth studio album Full Frequency. It was released on 10 September 2013 as a digital download. The song was written by Sean Paul, Benny Blanco, The Cataracs, and it was produced by the latter two.

== Charts ==
=== Weekly charts ===
Chart (2013)	Peak position
Austria (Ö3 Austria Top 40)	11
Belgium (Ultratip Bubbling Under Flanders)	33
Belgium (Ultratip Bubbling Under Wallonia)	2
Czech Republic (Rádio – Top 100)	10
France (SNEP)	82
Germany (GfK)	3
Ireland (IRMA)	9
Scotland (OCC)	5
Slovakia (Rádio Top 100)	7
Switzerland (Schweizer Hitparade)	4
UK Hip Hop/R&B (OCC)	1
UK Singles (OCC)	7

=== Year-end charts ===
Chart (2013)	Position
Germany (Official German Charts)	97
UK Singles (Official Charts Company)	153

== Certifications ==
Region	Certification	Certified units/sales
United Kingdom (BPI)	Silver	200,000^{‡}
^{‡} Sales+streaming figures based on certification alone.

== Release history ==
Regions	Dates	Formats	Labels
United States	10 September 2013	Digital download	Atlantic Records
United Kingdom	10 September 2013	Digital download	Atlantic Records
