= Turn It Up (Sean Paul song) =

Single by Sean Paul

from the album Full Frequency
- Released: 30 October 2013
- Recorded: 2013
- Genre: Dancehall; dance-pop
- Length: 3:54
- Label: Atlantic
- Songwriters: Joshua Coleman; Sean Paul Henriques; David Listenbee; Jordan Orvosh

Sean Paul singles chronology
"Entertainment 2.0" (2013)	"Turn It Up" (2013)	"Want Dem All" (2013)

"Turn It Up" is a song by Jamaican recording artist Sean Paul from his sixth studio album Full Frequency. It was released on 30 October 2013 as a digital download. The song peaked at number 35 on the UK Singles Chart.

== Charts ==
Weekly chart performance
Chart (2013)	Peak position
Austria (Ö3 Austria Top 40)	33
Belgium (Ultratip Bubbling Under Flanders)	89
Belgium (Ultratip Bubbling Under Wallonia)	11
Finland Airplay (Radiosoittolista)	54
Germany (GfK)	21
Scotland Singles (OCC)	32
Switzerland (Schweizer Hitparade)	31
UK Singles (OCC)	35

== Release history ==
Street dates
Regions	Dates	Format	Label
United Kingdom	20 October 2013	Digital download	Atlantic Records
Germany	22 November 2013	Digital Download	Atlantic Records
