= Cheb Kader =

Moroccan singer-songwriter and composer

Cheb Kader الشاب قادر قويدر المرابط
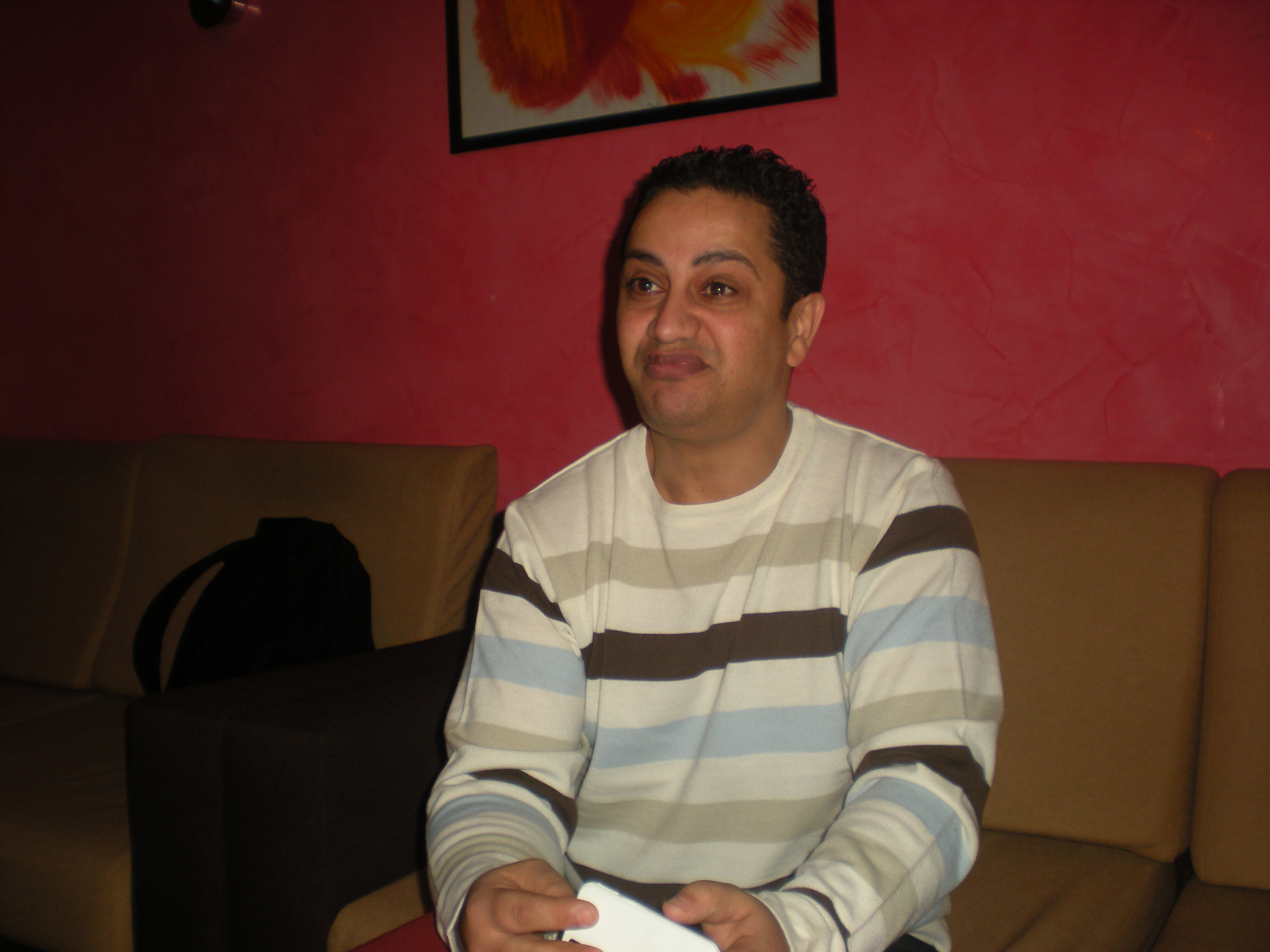

Background information
- Also known as: Cheb Kader, Kader
- Born: Kouider Morabet; 1966 (age 59–60); Oran Algeria
- Origin: Morocco
- Genres: Raï, pop, blues, jazz
- Occupations: Singer-songwriter, instrumentalist and producer
- Instruments: Guitar, violin, harmonica, accordion, piano
- Years active: 1980s–present

Kouider Morabet (Arabic: قويدر المرابط), better known as Cheb Kader (Arabic: الشاب قادر), is a Moroccan singer, songwriter, composer and pioneer of raï music.

== Early life and education ==
Cheb Kader was born in 1966 in Oran, Algeria to Moroccan parents. He is of Moroccan descent. In an interview Cheb Kader said him and his family were part of the 350,000 Moroccans who were expelled from Algeria to Morocco in 1975.

Cheb Kader was nine years old when he moved to France to join his father. His father, a musician himself, encouraged his son to play music. The two formed a small band together, with Kader's father playing flute and Cheb Kader on percussion. To encourage his son's passion for music, Cheb Kader's father offered him a guitar and the young Kader began to take music theory classes.

== Career ==
In 1986 he recorded his first album "Reggae-rai," the first fusion of Rai with other music genres.

He released his eponymous album "Cheb Kader" in 1988.

In 1991, Cheb Kader offered another new album to his fans entitled "Generation Raï".

Cheb Kader is the first pioneer of Raï music in France thanks to the new style he brought to this music, introducing an international approach to his style, as in his songs "Sel Dem Drai" or "Sid El Houari" released in 1988, or even former than that, in his first album "Reggae raï" released in 1985, inspiring a whole generation of raï singers of that time. Cheb Kader is considered as the first innovator of the1980's Raï Movement, introducing elements of funk, rock, and reggae into a musical style with origins in the 1920s Algerian traditional music, and the Eastern region of Morocco. It is only in the mid-1980s that Raï is catapulted to the status of world music genre thanks to this new soul added to this music, especially with the arrival of new singers, or "Chebs," both males and females.

In 2002 Cheb Kader announces his comeback to the Raï music scene by signing with "Polydor Universal" his album "Mani", including hits such as "Majiti", "Selou" with its Latin rhythms in tandem with "Sergent Garcia" band, an R&B track "Atir" along with singer "Amel", or "Nsiti" with its gypsy beats. A strong comeback that confirms Cheb Kader as an outstanding Raï singer.

In 2009 he releases the best-of collection called "Dima-Rai".

In 2014 cheb kader is rewarded by the "UNESCO" and "The Moroccan Ministry of Culture" the trophy of "The Best Arab Singer of The Year 2014".

In 2015 Cheb Kader releases "Ma'nensek" with the Sophia Philharmonic Orchestra (Bulgaria), then his single called "Lila Kbira".

In 2016, he releases "Laghyem".

In 2018 Cheb Kader releases "Nektem" in collaboration with Bahi for music arrangements, and Fatima Zahra El Maaroufi for the lyrics.

Cheb Kader is preparing his 5th album entitled "FUSION", of which he releases his singles "Nadia" and "Liyem".
