= Moroccan pop =

Music genre in Morocco

- Stylistic origins: Moroccan music; Pop music
- Cultural origins: 2000s
- Typical instruments: Electric guitar, bass guitar, drum machine, keyboard

Other topics
- Arabic music, Moroccan culture

Moroccan pop or abbreviated as Morocco-pop music is a genre of the new Moroccan music generation along the hip hop, rap music in Morocco.

== List of Moroccan singers ==
- Manal
- Asma Lamnawar
- Saad Lamjarred
- Salma Rachid
- Ibtissam Tiskat
- Ahmed Chawki

== See also ==
- Moroccan hip hop
- Moroccan Chaabi
- Gnawa
- Raï
