= Wael Jassar =

Lebanese singer (born 1976)

Wael Jassar وائل جسّار
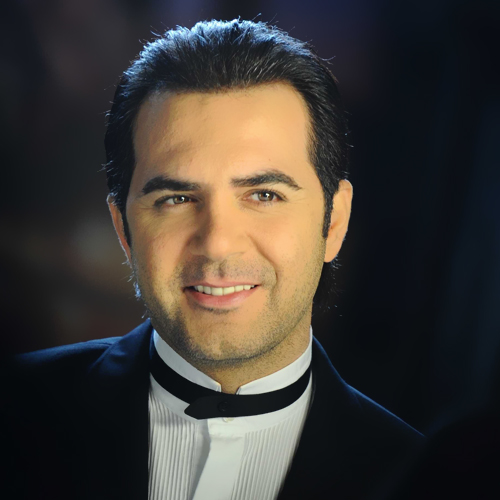

Background information
- Born: Wael Mohammed Wehbe Jassar وائل محمد وهبي جسار; 22 November 1976 (age 49)
- Origin: Beqaa, Lebanon
- Genres: Arabic music
- Occupations: Singer, songwriter,
- Instrument: Vocals
- Years active: 1986–present

Wael Jassar (Arabic: وائل جسّار; born 22 November 1976) is a Lebanese singer.

== Discography ==
- Kelmet Wada’a Beta’zebne
- Saat Baqoul
- Meshit kalass
- Eldonia Allimitny
- Metgarrinbin
- Zay Elaasal
- Fi Hadrat al Mahboub
- 2009 Tewaedini
- 2011 Kul Daqeeqa Shakhsieh

=== Charted songs ===
Title	Year	Peak chart position	Album
Title	Year	MENA	Album
"Zrouf Mandany"	2015	4	Omry Wzekrayatoh
