= Music of Morocco =

Moroccan music has varied greatly over the centuries as well as between geographic regions and social groups. It is influenced by musical styles including Arabic, Berber, Andalusi, Mediterranean, Saharan, West African, and others.

Musical styles vary by geography. Andalusi music and malhun are associated with urban centers including Tetouan, Fes, Meknes, Rabat and Oujda, chaabi and aita are associated with the Atlantic coastal plains, reggada is associated with the Beni-Znassen region (Oujda, Berkane), gnawa with Essaouira and Marrakesh, ahidus with the Middle Atlas, ahwash with the Sous region, and guedra in the Sahara.

Since the 20th century, musicians have been synthesizing Moroccan musical traditions with influences from around the world, such as blues, rock, metal, reggae, rap, etc. Each genre and musical style is made up of regional subgroups, and is further divided between contemporary and traditional expressions.

== Traditional music styles ==
=== Aita ===
Aita (عيطة "call, cry or lament") is a Bedouin musical style that originates from the countryside of Morocco, especially the Atlantic plains such as Doukkala-Abda, Chaouia-Ouardigha, and Rehamna.

=== Amazigh folk music ===
There are many varieties of Berber folk music and dance in regions such as Rif, Atlas, Chawia, and Canaria. In 2021, the anthology of the musical art titled "Rrways - a journey into the realm of Amazigh wandering poet-singers", presenting a booklet and ten compact discs with current recordings, received the ' Prix Coups de Cœur - Musiques du Monde' of the Académie Charles Cross in France.

==== Ahwash ====
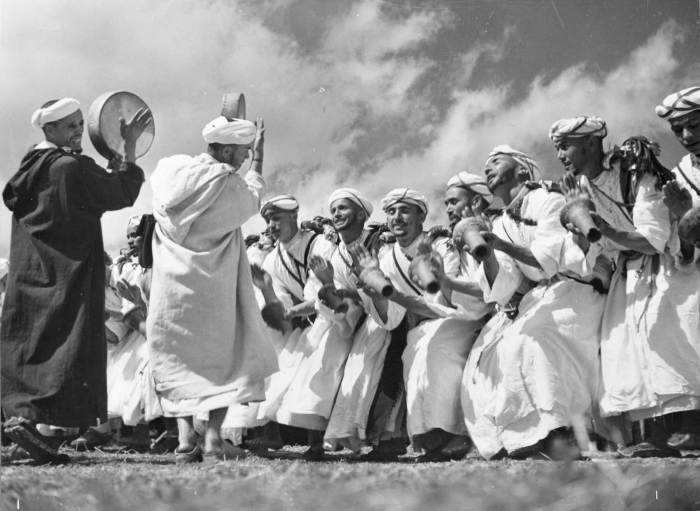
Ahwash in the High Atlas in 1955.

Ahwash (أحواش, ⴰⵃⵡⴰⵛ) is a collective musical form associated with Amazigh communities in southern Morocco, particularly around Ouarzazate, the Dra'a Valley, and Sous. Ahwash involves dance, singing, poetry, and percussion.

==== Ahidus ====
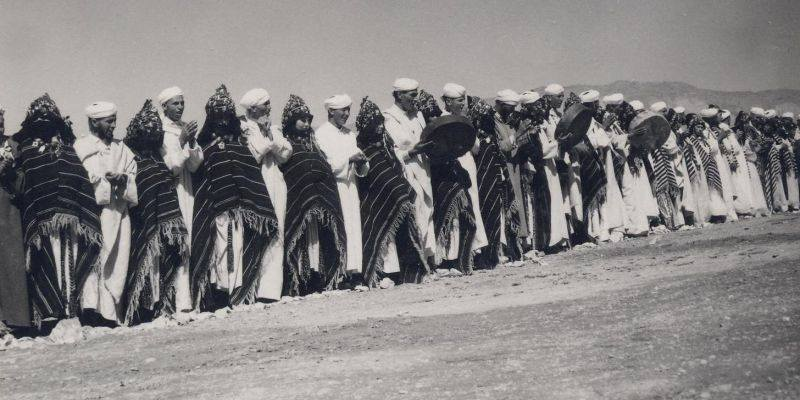
Ahidus in 2002.

Ahidus (أحيدوس, ⴰⵃⵉⴷⵓⵙ) is a style of collective dance and song of the Amazigh tribes in Middle and Eastern High Atlas.

==== Guedra ====
Guedra is a music and dance style associated with the Tuareg "blue people" of the Moroccan sahara. The name comes from an earthen cookingware over which a hide is stretched to form a drum.

=== Andalusi classical music ===
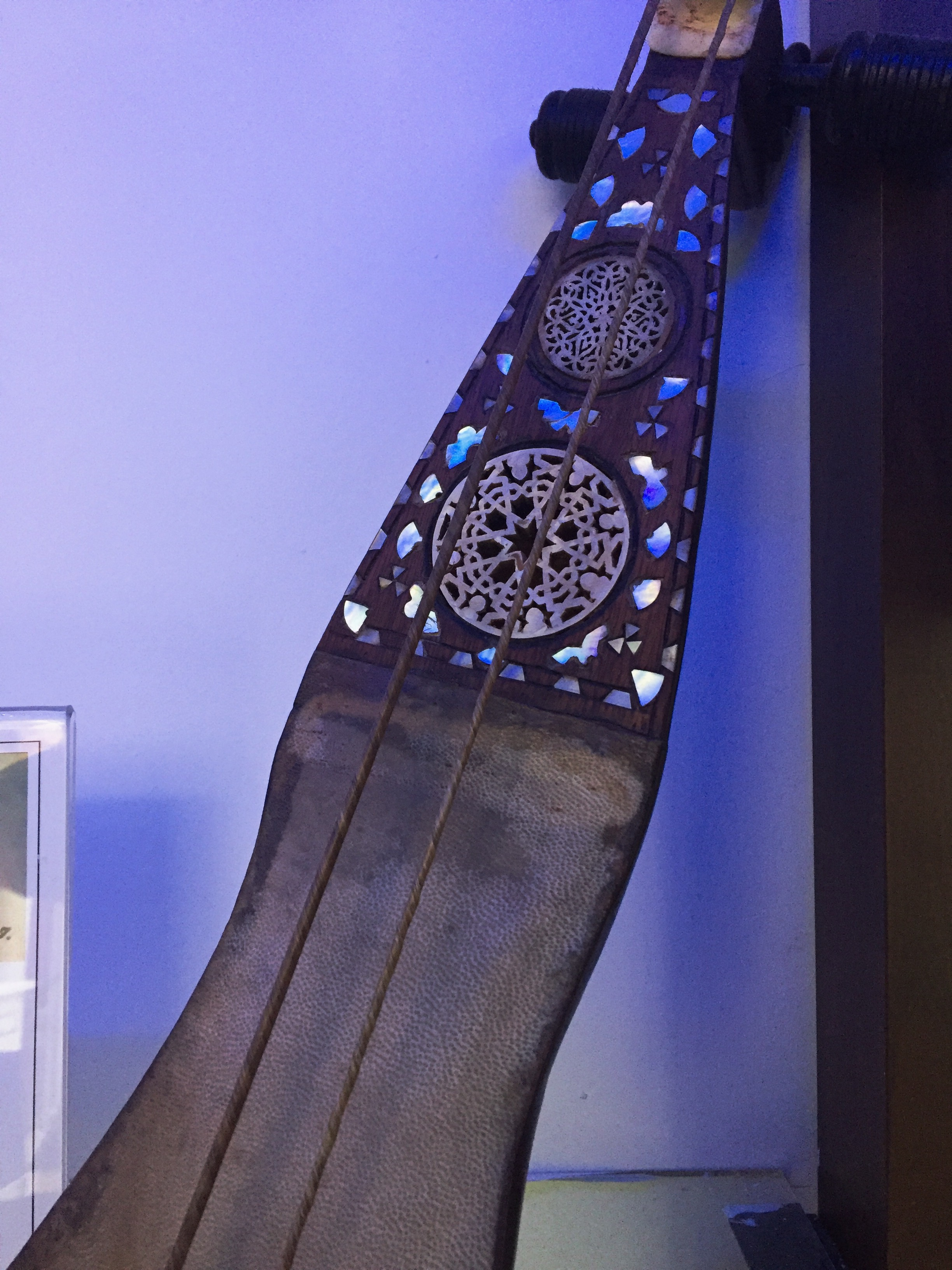
A Maghreb rebab on display at Dar al-Aala, a museum and conservatory dedicated to Andalusi musical heritage located in Casablanca.

For the music of Andalusia, Spain, see main article: Music of Andalusia

Andalusi classical music (Arabic: طرب أندَلُسي, موسيقى الآلة transliterated ṭarab andalusi or Musiqa al-Ala, Spanish: música andalusí) is a major genre of Arabic music found in different local substyles across the Maghreb (Morocco, Algeria, Tunisia, and Libya in the form of the Ma'luf style). It originated in the music of Al-Andalus (Muslim Iberia) between the 9th and 15th centuries.

Some of its lyrics are based on poetic works written by authors from Al-Andalus, such as Al-Shushtari, Ibn al-Khatib and Al-Mu'tamid ibn Abbad. Andalusi music is considered part of the longest traditions of art and music in the world. Andalusi music was greatly influenced by Ziryab, a freed Persian slave and musical pioneer, in the early 9th century. After Ziryab's death, two new styles of Arabic poetry were introduced in Al-Andalus: Muwashshahat and Zajal.

=== Chaabi "popular" folk music ===
Chaabi (Arabic: الشعبي, meaning popular in English) is a music consisting of numerous varieties which descend from the multifarious forms of Moroccan folk music. Chaabi was originally performed in markets, but is now found at any celebration or meeting.

=== Raï Music ===
Morocco has produced its own stars like Mimoun El Oujdi and Hanino. Rai music originated from Algeria, but is just as effective and popular in Morocco. This style of music was created during a period of political turmoil, and served a purpose of social and political commentary. Rai music has gained massive support over the years from the urban populace for its purpose of addressing taboo topics. It was also greatly known for code switching between French and Arabic. Rai artists use this method to add to the rhetorical and aesthetic effect of the lyrics, as well as a method of opening the lyrics to a wider range of an audience.

=== Gnawa music ===
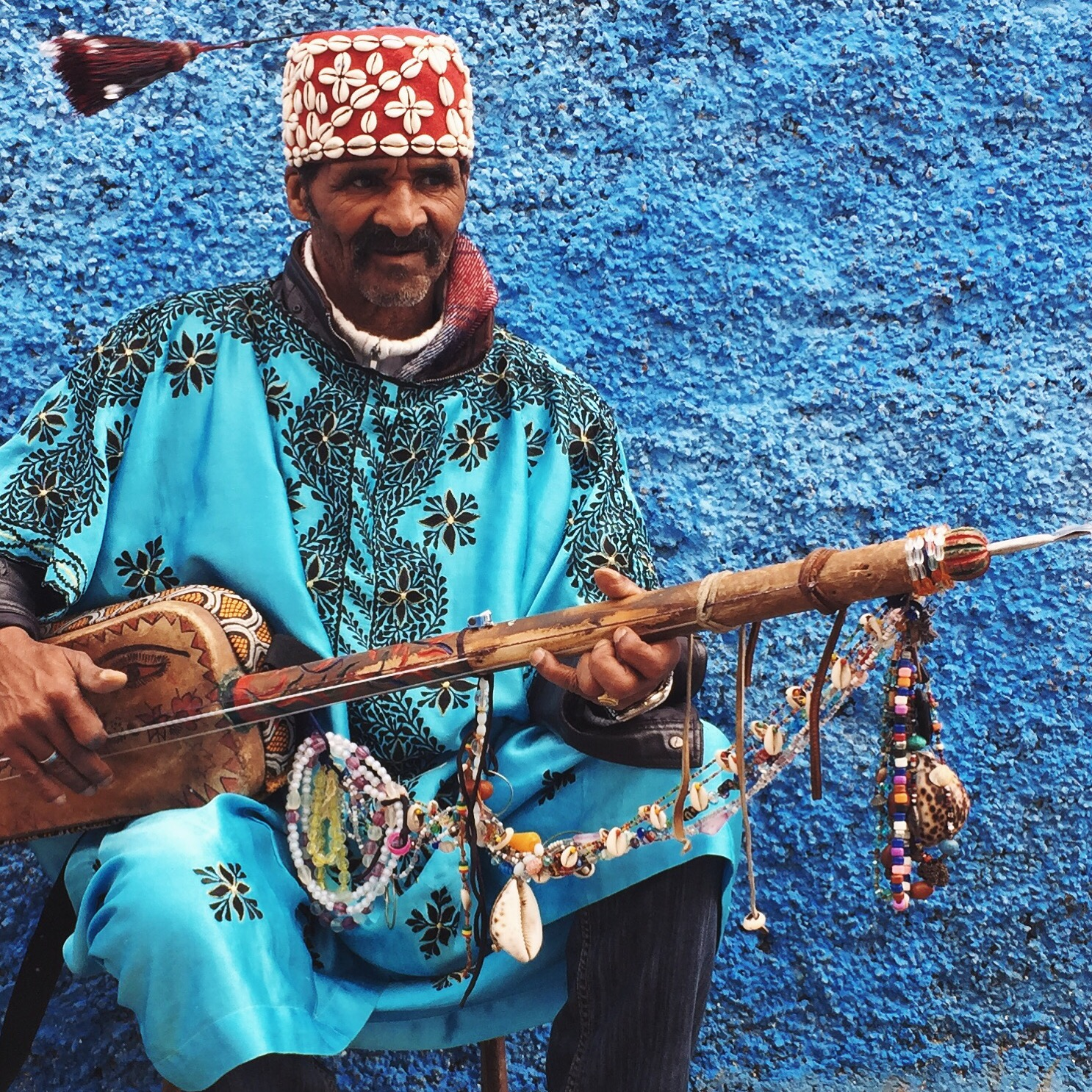
A gnawa street performer wearing traditional gnawi clothing in Rabat's Qasbat al-Widaya.

Gnawa music is a mystical form of music and incantation of West African origin. It was initially brought to Morocco by Sub-Saharan Africans and gradually became part of the Moroccan musical tradition. The gnawa musicians are respected for their spiritual performances. Through oral traditions, they have handed down a specific cultural ceremony, called derdeba or lila, which consists of song, dance, the burning of incense and of specific costumes and colours. The instruments used are large drums called “tbel” or “qanqa” and metal double castanets called “garageb”. The main instrument is a three-stringed bass lute, called the “gimbri” accompanied by the chanting of the singers.

=== Classical Malhun ===
Classical Malhun is peaceful music associated with urban centers such as Meknes, Fes, Salé, Tetouan, and Oujda. It has been played around in the streets of Morocco for over a thousand years. It is very common music to hear in Morocco.

=== Classical Sufi music ===
Sufi brotherhoods (tariqas) are common in Morocco, and music is an integral part of their spiritual tradition. This music is an attempt at reaching a trance state which inspires mystical ecstasy.

== Recent styles ==
=== Funk ===
Attarazat Addahabia was one of the pioneers of funk music in Morocco. Jil Jilala was also influential in this genre.

=== Rock ===
Nass El Ghiwane, led by Larbi Batma, was an icon of Moroccan music in the late 20th century. Hoba Hoba Spirit is a rock band that draws influence from traditional Moroccan styles such as gnawa, as well as styles from abroad such as reggae. Bab L' Bluz combine Gnawa music with various influences such as blues and psychedelia to embody the "Nayda" movement among young people in Morocco.

=== Hip hop ===
Notable Moroccan rappers include H-Kayne, Muslim, Don Bigg, L'Morphine, 7liwa, Dizzy Dros, Shayfeen and others. Among the younger generation there are ElGrandeToto, Issam, Stormy, and others.

== See also ==
- Ahmed El Bidaoui
- Arabic music
- Arabic pop music
- Berber music
- Culture of Morocco
- Festival Taragalte
- Moroccan literature

== Notes ==
- Muddyman, Dave. "A Basic Expression of Life". 2000. In Broughton, Simon and Ellingham, Mark with McConnachie, James and Duane, Orla (Ed.), World Music, Vol. 1: Africa, Europe and the Middle East, pp 567–578. Rough Guides Ltd, Penguin Books. ISBN 1-85828-636-0

== Bibliography ==
- Chants et Danses Berbères (Moyen Atlas - Foire au Mouton de Timhadit) par Alexis Chottin 16 juin 1935 in Revue de musicologie, T. 17e, No. 58e (1936), pp. 65–69
- Olsen, Myriam; Lortat-Jacob, Bernard, pref. Musiques de l’Atlas, Arles : Actes Sud : Cité de la musique, 1997 .
- Guettat, Mahmoud, La musique classique du Maghreb, Paris : Sindbad, 1980 . (La bibliothèque arabe).
- Aydoun, Ahmed, Musiques du Maroc, Casablanca : Editions EDDIF, 1994.
- Mohamed Belghazi (dir.), Instruments des musiques populaires et de confréries du Maroc. Fragments de musées, Aix-en-Provence : Edisud, La croisée des chemins, 1998.
- Catherine Homo-Lechner et Christian Rault, Instruments de musique du Maroc et d'al-Andalus, Fondation Royaumont / CERIMM, 1999.
- Schuyler, Philip (2001). "Morocco, Kingdom of". Grove Music online. Oxford University Press. doi:10.1093/gmo/9781561592630.article.19156. ISBN 978-1-56159-263-0.
- Aydoun, Ahmed. La Musique Juive Du Maroc = Morocco's Jewish Music. Rabat: Marsam, 2019.
