= I Love Hip Hop in Morocco =

- Directed by: Josh Asen
- Release date: 2007
- Country: United States

I Love Hip Hop in Morocco is a 2007 film by Josh Asen who decided to film hip hop in Morocco with his friend Jennifer Needle. While interviewing Moroccan hip-hop artists, they told him that they needed concerts to promote their music. Asen managed to get the U.S. Embassy and Coca-Cola to sponsor a music festival.

Groups of musicians started the country's first hip hop tour in three Moroccan cities - Meknes, Marrakesh, and Casablanca. The three concerts brought in thousands of audience members.

The film ended up as a 2007 documentary about the musicians' struggles and what it is like to rap in a Muslim country. The documentary mainly focuses on DJ Key, H-Kayne, Don Bigg, Fati Show, and the hip-hop group Fnaire.
