= Mobydick (rapper) =

Moroccan rapper and record producer (born 1978)

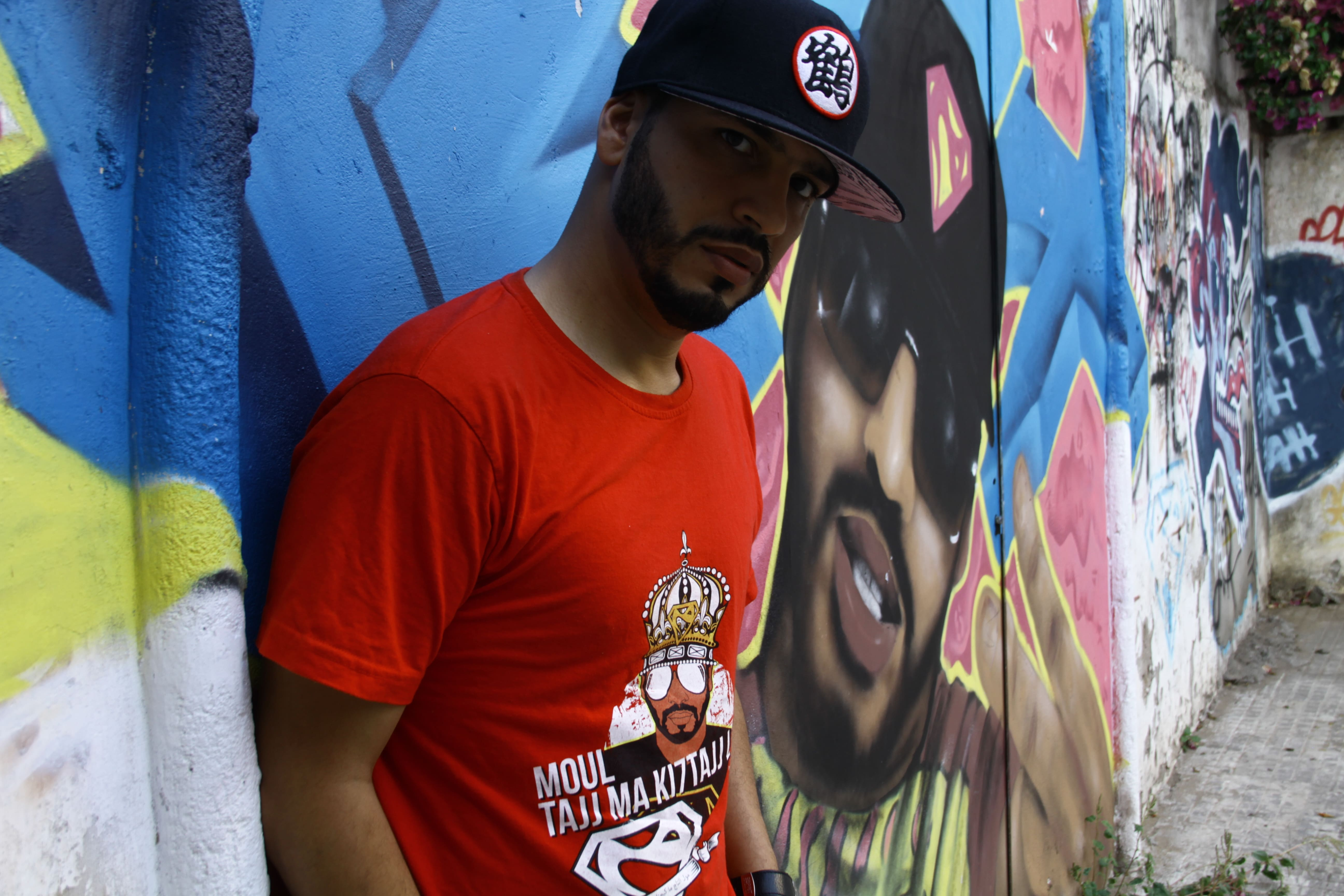
Mobydick in front of a graffiti mural depicting him in his native Hassan neighborhood.

Younes Taleb (Arabic: يونس طالب, born on July 29, 1978), better known by his stage names Mobydick and LMoutchou, is a Moroccan rapper and record producer. He is regarded as one of the most influential figures in Moroccan hip-hop, credited for popularizing hardcore rap and introducing Japanese anime culture into the local rap scene. His music is also known for its "anti-system" or anti-government stance.

== Career ==
Younes Taleb grew up in the Hassan neighborhood in Rabat. Originally a popping dancer, he earned the nickname 'Younes Michael' in reference to his Michael Jackson-imitating dance skills, including the moonwalk. He then turned to rap, developing an interest in writing and music production while citing American rappers like Vanilla Ice and MC Hammer as early influences.

Influenced by French rap, especially IAM and MC Solaar, he began writing in French before adopting Moroccan Darija to reach a wider audience within Morocco. He was a member of two rap groups: first NGM (Nouvelle Génération Marocaine) in the mid-90s, and later La Sekte in 2004. He subsequently launched a solo career. Taleb claims he recorded his first song in 1993 when he was around 15 years old.

In 2006, Taleb won the Tremplin competition at the L'boulevard festival in Casablanca, marking the start of his professional career. He gained recognition with tracks such as his French-language "Ma Clique & Moi", and Arabic ones like "Toc Toc", "Mou3ella9ate", and "Ddi Ma T3awed". The same year, he was nominated for the Maghrib Music Awards in the categories of "Best Rap/Hip-Hop Artist" and "Best Track" for the song "Ma Clique & Moi", which received heavy radio airplay while his track "Toc Toc" became one of the most popular hits in Morocco in 2007.

In response to the 2003 Casablanca bombings, he released “Ne Touche Pas Mon Pays”, (Don’t Touch My Country). He has released several projects, including his album L'moutchou Family (2010). In 2011, he founded his own label, Adghal Records, aiming to support and produce independent artists within the Moroccan hip-hop scene. In 2019, he dissed fellow rapper 7liwa in a rap beef releasing of the diss track "L'EX D'Fatema".

== Musical style ==
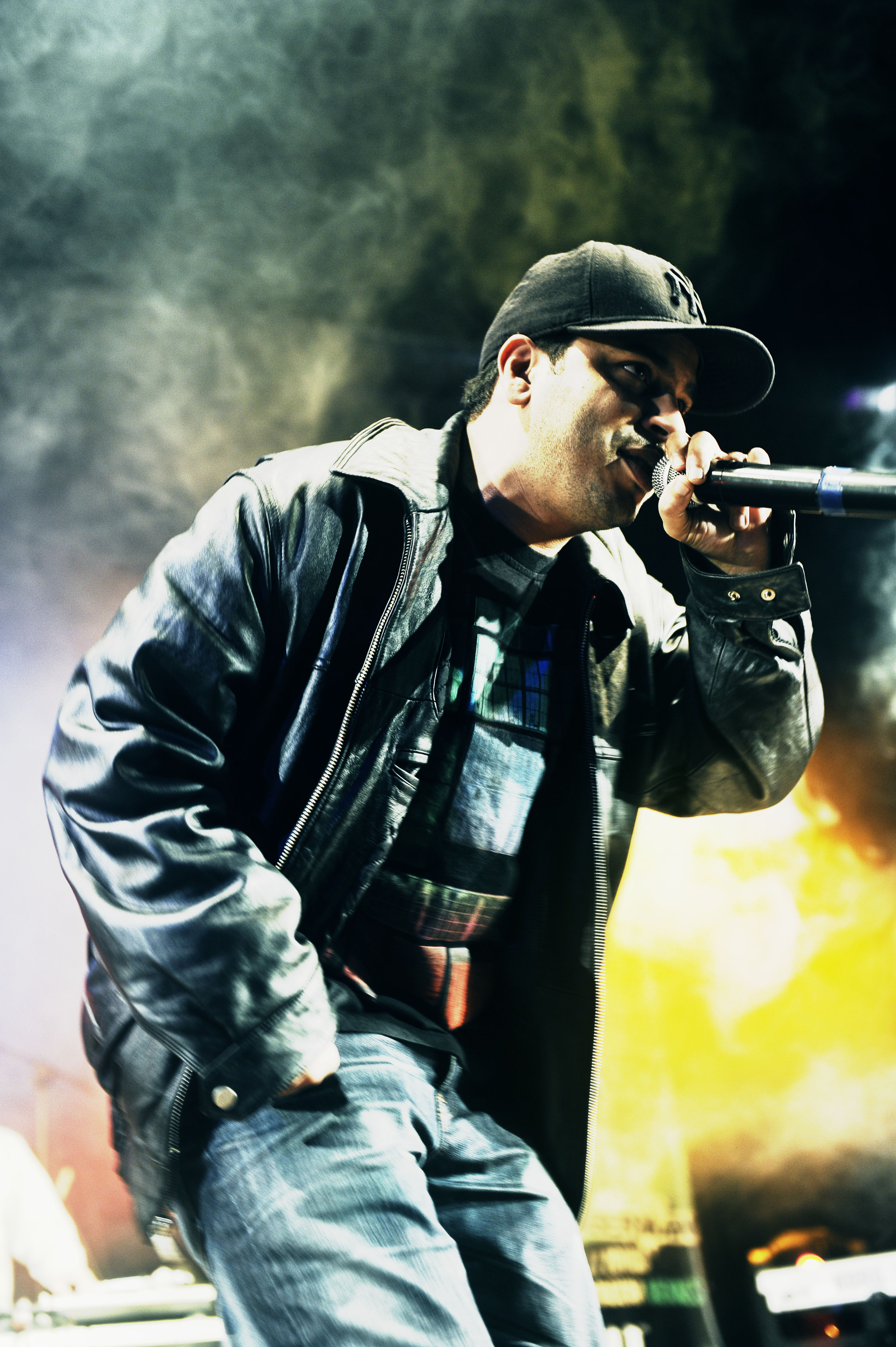
Mobydick live at the Mohamed Lmnouni Theater, Meknes - Morocco (2010)

Taleb is recognized for his conscious lyrics, imbued with humor and irony, which address the social and political flaws of Moroccan society. For example, the satirical music video "Lmoutchoukistan" is his criticism of figures like Barack Obama and Hillary Clinton and groups like Al Qaeda. He describes himself as "anti-system". He raps in both Darija and French, which has allowed him to reach a wide audience.

About rap music he said: "For me, rap revolutionized the music industry because it allows those without a great voice, but with great intellectual abilities, to express themselves musically." On rapping in Darija, he said: "Darija is quite complex, it’s like using a joystick on ‘very hard’ play mode to score the same as someone on ‘very easy’ mode.“ It is the language of a people who had been underestimated throughout their lives, so it’s only natural they’d develop it to a point that it would resist on its own."

== Nickname ==
The nickname "LMoutchou" (الموتشو), in Moroccan dialect, refers to modest people, often underprivileged. His first album Lmoutchou Family (2010), is a conceptual project that tells the story of a modest Moroccan family, with each song depicting a different character and struggle.

== Awards ==
2006 – Winner of the Tremplin competition at the L'Boulevard festival in Casablanca.

== Discography ==
=== Albums ===
- Lmoutchou Family (2010)

=== Mixtapes & EPs ===
- Dars Khass 9abl L'album (2009)
- Dars Khass Ba3da L'album (2012)
- Fast Food (2014)
- Lmadda Lkham (2016)
- Pack De 6 (2021)

== See also ==
- Moroccan hip-hop
- Don Bigg
- L'Morphine
