= Dizzy DROS =

Moroccan rapper (born 1989)

- Born: Omar Souhaili; 19 July 1989 (age 37); Casablanca, Morocco
- Other names: Mr. Cazafonia; 3azzy; Moutanabbi
- Occupations: Rapper; producer
- Years active: 2011–present
- Notable work: M3a L3echrane; 3azzy 3ando Stylo
- Musical career
- Genre: Rap • West Coast hip-hop
- Instrument: Vocals

Omar Souhaili (Arabic: عمر سهيلي; born July 19, 1989), better known by his stage name Dizzy DROS, or just Dizzy, is a Moroccan rapper, songwriter and record producer. Souhaili first gained recognition with the release of his debut music video, "Casafonia" in 2011. The track received significant airplay on major Moroccan radio stations, including Hit Radio, Radio Mars, and Cap Radio, quickly establishing him as a rising star in the Moroccan rap scene and earning him a fanbase.

Souhaili further established a name for himself in Moroccan hip-hop with the release of his debut album, 3azzy 3ando Stylo in 2013, widely regarded as one of the best and most influential albums in the country.

His 2019 track "Moutanabbi" (Al-Mutanabbi), a diss aimed at Don Bigg's diss track "170KG" achieved viral success, surpassing one million views on YouTube in less than 24 hours, and over 24 million views as of February, 2026.

== Early life ==
Born in 1989 in Casablanca, Morocco, Souhaili grew up in the Bine El-Mdoune neighborhood. His stage name, "DROS," is an acronym for 'Da Rhymes of Streets,' and he also performs under the alias Mr. Cazafonia. He began writing lyrics and developing his rap style at the age of 17.

== Career ==
=== Early career ===
For four years, Souhaili worked on demo singles before releasing his breakthrough track, "Cazafonia" in 2011. This early period included a significant collaboration with Khalid Douache, a key figure in Moroccan hip-hop, who directed the music video for the track and helped elevate Souhaili's profile.

His debut album, 3azzy 3ando Stylo (commonly shortened to 33S), was released on November 22, 2013. The 21-track album, featuring collaborations with rappers like Muslim and Shayfeen, focused on the life of Moroccan urban youth. Its release was celebrated at the Instituto Cervantes in Casablanca. That year, he also performed at major festivals like L'Boulevard des Jeunes Musiciens and shared the stage with the Colombian group C15 and the Moroccan group H-Kayne at the Centre Culturel Renaissance in Rabat.

Souhaili began appearing in mainstream media, participating in debates on Moroccan artists and the internet on shows like Génération News and making appearances on the Moroccan public channel 2M and various radio programs. In February 2014, he performed at the 7th Edition of the Maroc Web Awards at the National Theatre Mohamed V in Rabat.

=== Mainstream prominence ===
In 2019, Souhaili released "Moutanabbi," a diss track aimed at fellow Moroccan rapper Don Bigg, which garnered significant attention. That same year, he ventured into voice acting, portraying the character "Measurehead" in the critically acclaimed video game Disco Elysium.

Souhaili was one of the singers that took part in the 2022 FIFA Club World Cup official song entitled "Welcome to Morocco", that took place in Morocco. On February 14, 2023, he released "M3a L3echrane," a music video featuring impersonations of public figures and containing political and social critiques. The video surpassed ten million views on YouTube within its first five days of release.

In 2024, Souhaili, alongside ElGrandeToto, served as a head judge on the national rap competition television show JamShow, which aimed to showcase Morocco's rising hip-hop talent. Nezar was crowned the winner of the competition. In April 2025, Souhaili became the first artist from the MENA region to secure an endorsement deal with the global sportswear brand Puma. That same month, he signed a record deal with Warner Music Middle East, which his management team described as "the biggest deal in the history of Moroccan rap."

== Political views ==
In an interview with Middle East Eye, Souhaili reflects on his own "red lines" as an artist, saying: “There are limits I don't cross … if you go so hard you lose the message, you lose people.

During the Gen Z protests in Morocco, Souhaili publicly expressed his support for the movement, denounced police violence against protesters, and called for the government's resignation. He also signed an open letter from over 60 intellectuals and artists addressed to King Mohammed VI, calling for transparency, the release of all GenZ212 detainees and political prisoners and the eradication of corruption.

== Critical response ==
3azzy 3ando Styloo

is considered by the magazine TelQuel as "one of the best hip hop albums of these last ten years" in Morocco. The magazine DimaTOP described the album as "artistically excellent and culturally impactful." The magazine Aujourd'hui Le Maroc described Dros' rap style as "an impressive flow, an improvisation that flirts with the mastery of words."

== Discography ==
=== Mixtape ===
- 3azzy 3ando Style (2012)

=== Album ===
- 3azzy 3ando Stylo (2013)
- AFLAM (2026)

=== Ep ===
- Tall Poppy Syndrome (2025)

=== Charted songs ===
Title	Year	Peak chart position	Album
Title	Year	MENA	Album
"M3a L3echrane"	2023	3	Non-album single

== See also ==
- Moroccan Hip Hop
- ElGrandeToto
- Don Bigg
- Stormy
