= Dilbar (song) =

Single by Alka Yagnik

Single by Alka Yagnik
- Language: Hindi
- Released: 11 June 1999
- Recorded: 1999
- Studio: Unknown
- Genre: Filmi, Dance pop
- Length: 5:46
- Label: T-Series
- Songwriter: Sameer (lyrics)
- Composer: Nadeem-Shravan (music)

Music video
- "Dilbar Dilbar" – Sirf Tum on YouTube

"Dilbar" is a single by Indian playback singer Alka Yagnik, originally featured in the soundtrack of the 1999 Hindi film Sirf Tum. The song was composed by the music duo Nadeem-Shravan with lyrics by Sameer.

The music video of the original song featured Sushmita Sen and Sanjay Kapoor.

The soundtrack album of Sirf Tum sold approximately 2.2 million units, making it the ninth best-selling Hindi film music album of 1999.

The song later inspired a popular remake version featuring Nora Fatehi in the music video, featured in the film Satyameva Jayate.

== Remake version ==
"Dilbar"

Single by Neha Kakkar, Dhvani Bhanushali and Ikka Singh

from the album Satyameva Jayate (2018 film)
- Language: Hindi
- Released: 3 July 2018
- Genre: Filmi; Folk-pop; Middle-Eastern; Indian hip hop
- Length: 2:14
- Label: T-Series
- Composer: Tanishk Bagchi
- Lyricists: Shabbir Ahmed; Ikka Singh

Music video
- "Dilbar - Satyameva Jayate" on YouTube

The recreated version of the song was released with the title "Dilbar" in Satyameva Jayate under the banner of T-Series on 3 July 2018. It was written by Shabbir Ahmed and Ikka Singh, composed by Tanishk Bagchi, choreographed by Adil Shaikh and Nora Fatehi and sung by Neha Kakkar and Dhvani Bhanushali, with rapping by Ikka Singh. Bagchi made use of the Oud, a fretless Middle Eastern stringed instrument, along with Arabic drums to re-envision the classic song for the new film.

The music video of this song features Moroccan-Canadian dancer Nora Fatehi in an item number. The video heavily references Arabic culture, and the actor John Abraham also makes an appearance. In the music video, Nora Fatehi performs belly dancing, an Arabic dance style that was previously featured in a number of popular Bollywood item numbers, performed by actresses such as Helen in "Mehbooba O Mehbooba" from Sholay (1975), Zeenat Aman in "Raqqasa Mera Naam" from The Great Gambler (1979), Mallika Sherawat in "Mayya Mayya" from Guru (2007), and Rani Mukerji in "Aga Bai" from Aiyyaa (2012).

=== Reception ===
The remake received 20 million views on the first day of its YouTube release. It became the first Indian song to reach number three on the Billboard YouTube Music Chart. The Satyameva Jayate version of the song has received about 2 billion views on YouTube, making it one of the most-viewed song on the T-Series YouTube channel.

Devansh Sharma from Firstpost remarked, "The soul of the new track is Neha Kakkar who brings a sensual-yet-never-raunchy appeal through her vocals. Her range allows her to switch from the meditative stanzas to the uninhibited chorus like a chameleon." Shravan Shah from Missmalini said, "The original one was done so well and is so engraved in our hearts that the reprise version just doesn't match up to it." Nora's belly dancing has received wide praise, but the song has also received some mixed reactions from fans of the original song.

== Arabic Dilbar ==
"Arabic Dilbar"

Single by Nora Fatehi and Fnaire
- Language: Arabic; English; Hindi; French
- Released: 30 November 2018
- Genre: Arabic pop; Filmi; Indian pop; Moroccan hip-hop
- Length: 3:51
- Label: T-Series
- Composer: Mohcine Tizaf
- Lyricists: Khalifa Mennani; Achraf Aarab
- Producer: Bhushan Kumar

Music video
- "Dilbar Arabic Version" on YouTube

"Arabic Dilbar" is the Arabic language version of this song, featuring a mix of three languages (Arabic, Hindi, and French), was released on 30 November 2018 under the banner of T-Series. Nora Fatehi made her debut as a singer in this song, as a collaboration with Moroccan hip-hop group Fnaire. The song was composed by Mohcine Tizaf, with lyrics by Khalifa Mennani and Achraf Aarab, and the performance in the video for the release was choreographed by Caeser Gonsalves.

Whereas the Satyameva Jayate music video heavily referenced Arabic culture, the music video for the Arabic version instead heavily references Indian culture. In contrast to the Arabic belly dancing in the Satyameva Jayate video, Nora Fatehi and Fnaire instead perform standard Hindi dance music routines in the Arabic version.

=== Reception ===
According to Zee News, "The song easily crossed 100 million views on YouTube within days of its release and no sooner was the social media flooded with several mashups and dance videos." Srishti Kapoor of Mumbai Mirror said, "Her debut song as a pop artist in the Middle East and North Africa, just like the original, will make one want to dance. What makes it unique though, is the use of Moroccan instruments."
