= Issam (rapper) =

Moroccan rapper (born 1993)

- Born: Issam Harris; May 22, 1993 (age 33); Derb Sultan, Casablanca, Morocco
- Occupation: Rapper
- Years active: 2016–present
- Musical career
- Instrument: Vocals

Issam Harris (Arabic: عصام حريص, born 22 May 1993), known mononymously as Issam, is a Moroccan rapper, songwriter and photographer. He was born in Derb Sultan, Casablanca and became known in 2018 with his song and music video, "Trap Beldi". This track allowed him to gain popularity being one of the first Moroccan trap songs to get millions on YouTube and it was included in BBC's list of the "Greatest Hip-Hop Songs of All Time," being the only Moroccan rapper on the list.

In May 2019, Issam signed a contract with Universal Music France, in what was considered the biggest ever deal for North African hip-hop. His debut album "Crystal" was officially released on May 6, 2021.

== Artistic style ==
What is particular of Issam's music is the blending of autotuned vocals delivered in Darija, and classic TR 808-generated beats with elements from traditional North African music. Many of Issam's works are influenced by raï—specifically by Cheb Hasni.

== Discography ==
=== Albums ===
- Crystal (2021)

=== Singles ===
- 2016: "Taba Taba"
- 2017: "Rolex"
- 2017: "Hasni"
- 2018: "Bavra"
- 2018: "Caviar"
- 2018: "Trap Beldi"
- 2019: "Makinch Zhar"
- 2020: "Nike"
- 2020: "Power Rangers"
- 2021: "Wra Tabi3a"
- 2021: "Hendrix"
- 2022: "Phantom"
- 2022: "YA HASRA"

== See also ==
- Moroccan hip hop
- Music of Morocco
