= L'Boulevard =

Annual music festival in Casablanca, Morocco

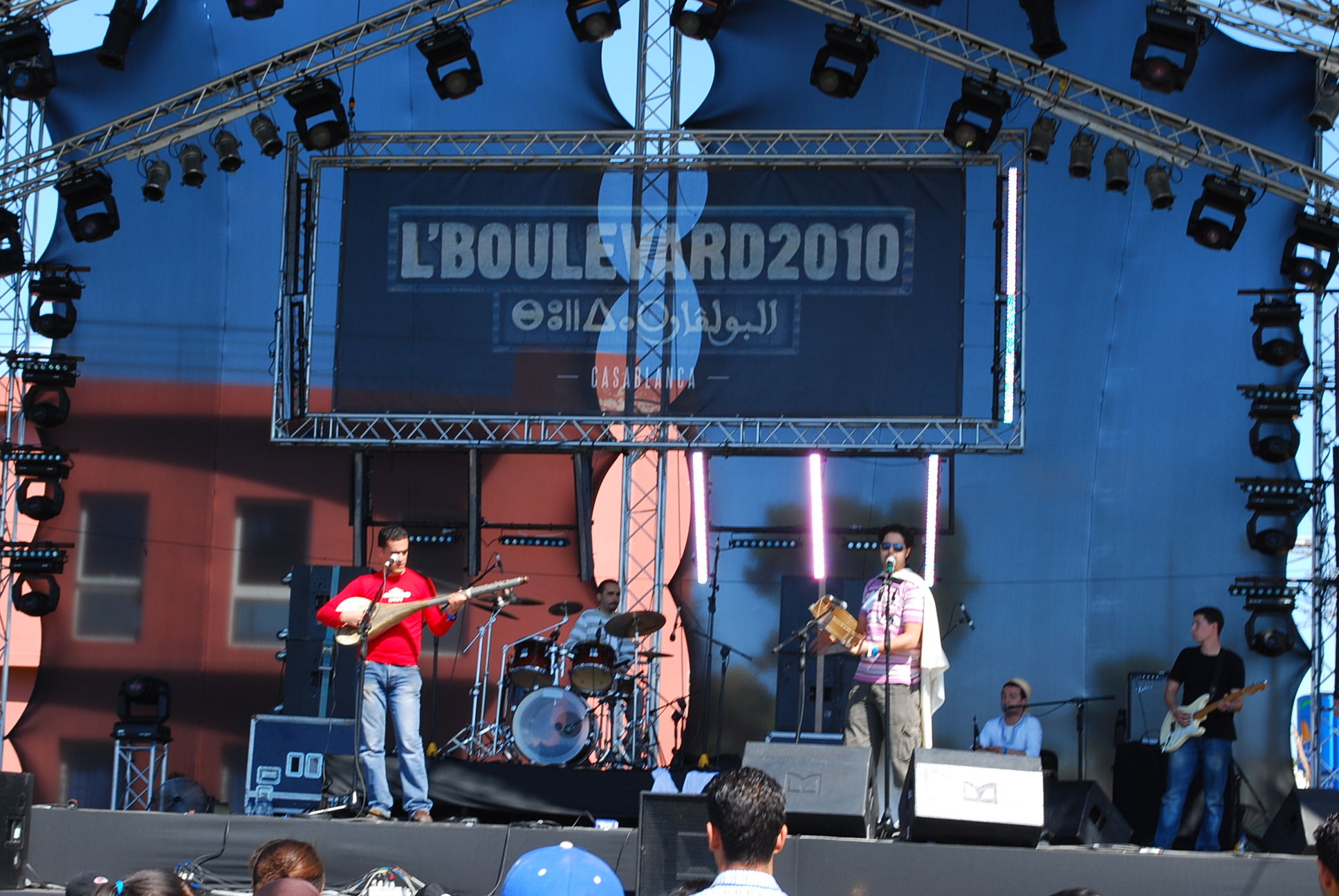
- L'Boulevard in 2010.
- Genre: hip hop; rock; metal; world music; electronic
- Locations: Casablanca, Morocco
- Years active: 1999–2000, 2002–2010, 2013–2015, 2017–2019, 2022–Present
- Organiser: EAC-L’Boulvart
- Website: https://boulevard.ma

L'Boulevard (Moroccan Arabic: لبولڤار) is an urban music festival held annually in Casablanca, Morocco. A segment named Tremplin (trampoline) is held in the form of a competition, allowing young musical groups to gain exposure to a larger audience. There are three main components to the event: L'Boulevard Festival, the Tremplin competition, and Sbagha Bagha—an opportunity for graffiti artists to cover the "White City" with their creations.

== History ==
The event was created by Mohamed Merhari (also known as Momo) and Hicham Bahou in 1999. It was initially conceived as a competition to reward the best contestants in each of the 3 categories: hip-hop and rap, rock and metal, and fusion. Over the years, this festival has developed into a landmark event in Casablanca. Artists such as Don Bigg of Mafia C from (Casablanca), H-Kayne (Meknes), Fnaire (Marrakesh), Zanka Flow (Tangier) and others and have participated in this competition and have been chosen as the best contestants.

The concerts are an opportunity for underground Moroccan music groups to make themselves known to a wider public, as well as national and international media.

In 2006, some groups, such as the Portuguese gothic metal group Moonspell, attracted 20,000 spectators.

== Program ==
The festival program includes competing musical groups as well as young groups and established groups. They contribute to the development of the youth music scene through meetings and workshops.

== Organization ==
The festival is 4 days long, with one day for each of the four genres of the festival:

- electro
- rap
- rock/metal

Each day, there are two sections:

- In the afternoon, there is the competition at the Racing Universitaire de Casablanca (RUC) stadium. These stages are called the "Tremplin Stages." This section has also been held at the Old Abattoirs.
- The evening performances take place at the Club Olympique Casablancais (COC) Stadium, where well-known national and international musicians—such as Kreator, Moonspell, Paradise Lost, Gojira—are invited to perform.

== 2022 Incident ==
Due to COVID-19, the festival went through a two-year hiatus and announced its return in 2022, celebrating its 20th anniversary.

On Friday 30 September, during its Rap/Hip-Hop programming, attendees reported a number of violent acts ranging from physical and sexual violence, as well as crowd suffocation and stampede. There were multiple reports on security and police failed attempt to contain the crowd, and address the safety issues, as well as having no proper evacuation plans.

The festival posted a press communique the next day, condemning the acts of violence committed, which gathered an outrage on social media for the lack of accountability towards the victims, and the affirmation that the festival will continue regardless of the security issues.
