= Shams Dinn =

Moroccan former rapper and break-dancer

- Born: Mohamed Ben Bouchta; Oujda, Morocco
- Genres: French hip hop; Moroccan hip hop; conscious rap
- Occupations: Rapper; Breakdancer
- Years active: 1980s–1990s

Mohamed Ben Bouchta (Arabic: محمد بن بوشتا, born in the early 60s), better known by his stage name Shams Dinn (شمس الدين), is a former Moroccan rapper and breakdancers. He is considered as one of the very first, if not the first, rapper to record and release a rap song in the Arabic language. His work in the French rap scene of the 1980s, especially his 1987 single “Hedi Bled Noum”, is cited as a key milestone in the early development of Arabic hip-hop.

== Early life ==
Mohamed Ben Bouchta was born around the early 1960s (possibly 1961) in Oujda, Morocco. His father died before he was born, and he was raised by his grandfather. As a child, he moved with his mother to Lyon, France, then later to Paris, where he grew up immersed in the developing European hip-hop scene of the late 1970s and early 1980s.

== Career ==
Ben Bouchta began as a breakdancer, inspired by American figures such as Kurtis Blow and Melle Mel, and began rapping in his late teens, mainly in Arabic despite being surrounded by French-language rap. In 1986, at a nightclub in Paris, Ben Bouchta met Patrick Duteil, better known as DJ Sidney, an early figure in French hip-hop. DJ Sidney handed Ben Bouchta the microphone, when Ben Bouchta began rapping in Arabic, the crowd responded "warmly".

His breakthrough came with the 1987 single “Hedi Bled Noum”, meaning Land of Dreams or The Land of Sleep, produced by Jess-Jemel Dif through Hamedi Records. The record, a mixture of raï and funk influences, became a hit in North Africa and North-Mediterranean countries, getting airplays on stations such as Radio Nova as well as appearing on TV programs like Les Enfants du Rock and Mosaïque.

The success of “Hedi Bled Noum” led the major label BMG to sign Ben Bouchta and commission a full album, recorded around 1986–1987 with producer Jean Soullier. The album was supposed to include seven tracks. However, the project was shelved when the First Gulf War broke out and the label, fearing backlash in relation to Arabic music, decided against the promotion. Reportedly, after recording the album in Arabic, Ben Bouchta was asked by the label to re-record it in French, an offer he refused, which led to him being dropped from the label. This "principled" rejection is usually praised about Ben Bouchta's character, while his song “Hedi Bled Noum” is considered among the first rap songs released in Arabic.

In the 2020s, an archival project led by record label Smiling C reissued a compilation of Ben Bouchta's work, including “Hedi Bled Noum” and the previously unreleased songs and an interview. The album has been received positively.

== See also ==
- Moroccan hip-hop
- H-Kayne - a pioneering Moroccan rap group
- Don Bigg - an influential Moroccan rapper
