= Dinn =

Dinn is an English and Irish surname, of Gaelic or Norman origin. The name has three possible origins: a nickname for Dennis (Dinis), another origin is an Irish byname meaning "brown" or "dark coloured", another origin is Anglo-Norman meaning "an inhabitance of the Norman town Dives-sur-Mer". The surname is well known in the United States and Canada, being very common in Massachusetts, Indiana, and Newfoundland and Labrador.

== Notable people with the surname ==
- Charles Dinn, American roller-coaster designer and founder of the Dinn Corporation
- Denise Dinn-Larrick and Jeff Dinn, American roller-coaster manufacturers, founders of Custom Coasters International
- Jerome Dinn (born 1940), Canadian politician
- Jim Dinn (born 1960), Canadian politician
- John Dinn, Canadian politician
- Noel Dinn, Canadian musician, founder of Figgy Duff
- Paul Dinn, Canadian politician

== See also ==
- Shams Dinn, Moroccan rapper and breakdancer
