= Bidaoui =

Bidaoui is a surname. Notable people with the surname include:

- Ahmed El Bidaoui (1918–1991), Moroccan musician and singer
- Soufiane Bidaoui (born 1990), Moroccan professional footballer
