= M3a L3echrane =

"مع العشران"

Song by Dizzy DROS
- Language: Moroccan Arabic (Darija)
- English title: M3a L3echrane
- Released: February 14, 2023

Music videos
- "M3a L3echrane" on YouTube

"M3a L3echrane" (Note: The 3 represents the letter ʿayn.) (Moroccan Arabic: مع العشران, romanized: mʿa lʿešrān, lit. 'with the homies') is a song by the Moroccan rapper Dizzy DROS released on February 14, 2023. The song is in the invective tradition of a diss track, making a variety of social and political critiques. The music video was viewed over 10 million times on YouTube in the first five days of its release, with three million views in the first 24 hours alone. As of October 2025, the video has over 91 million views.

== Music video ==
The music video for "M3a L3echrane", directed by WLDRB (ولدّرب), Oualid and Youness Bouslame, begins with a disclaimer:

تنبيه: كل الأحداث حقيقية وليست من خيال المؤلف. واللي جا قدّو السبّاط يلبسو.
"Disclaimer: This is not a work of fiction, all the characters in this film are real and are not a product of the author's imagination. And if the shoe fits, wear it."

The clip features impersonations of various public figures, with Dizzy Dros performing the likenesses of the pop star Manal Benchlikha, the Prime Minister of Morocco and Akwa Group CEO Aziz Akhannouch, and the Al-Jazeera al-Ittijah al-Muʿākis debate show host Faisal al-Qassem. Other figures are also represented in the clip, including the rapper Don Bigg, the influencer Asmaa Beauty, the secular Amazigh scholar-activist Ahmed Assid, and the Islamist politician and former prime minister Abdelilah Benkirane.

Freedom of the press is another theme; in one scene, Dizzy Dros, dressed as a reporter, is dragged away from a news conference and imprisoned after having thrown a shoe, an allusion to Muntadhar al-Zaidi's throwing of his shoes at George W. Bush in 2008.

== Reception ==
The Moroccan literary critic Chouaib Halifi lauded "M3a L3echrane" and likened Dizzy DROS to Antarah ibn Shaddad in the use of creative artistic expression to courageously challenge an unjust reality, and to Al-Mutanabbi in the use of veiled and explicit messages and in impressing colleagues with artistic ability.

== Charts ==
=== Weekly charts ===
Weekly chart performance for "M3a L3echrane"
Chart (2023)	Peak position
MENA (IFPI)	3
