= Rahma Riad =

Iraqi singer (born 1987)

Rahma Riad رحمة رياض
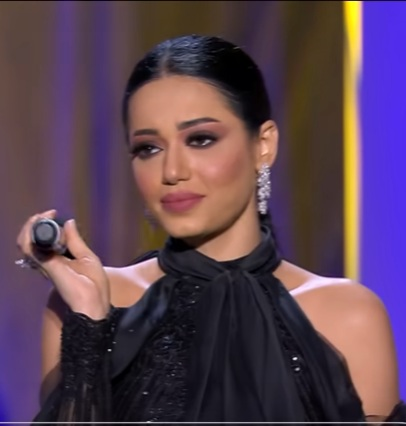
- Riad performing at Souq Wagif Festival in 2019

Background information
- Born: Rahma Abdulredha Mezher Al-Sibahi رحمة عبد الرضا مزهر السباهي; 19 January 1987 (age 38); Basra, Iraq
- Genres: Arabic music
- Occupations: Singer, actress
- Years active: 2004–present

Rahma Abdulredha Mezher Al-Sibahi (Arabic: رحمة عبد الرضا مزهر السباهي; born 19 January 1987), better known as Rahma Riad (رحمة رياض), is an Iraqi singer and actress. She is the daughter of Iraqi singer Abdulredha Mezher Al-Sibahi, better known as Riad Ahmed. As of August 2020, her song "Waed Menni" is among the top ten most streamed songs on YouTube by a female Arab artist with more than 148 million views.

== Life and career ==
=== 2004: Career beginnings ===
Riad has been a contestant in a number of music contests in the Arab world. She first completed in the Super Star program when she was seventeen years old and reached the second stage, but she did not reach the finale. She later joined the Gulf Star competition, which featured individuals who perform Gulf music. She remained in the contest until the finals, and in cooperation with the Iraqi artist Haitham Yousif, famously performed the song "Er7moni Ya Alem" in dedication to the Iraqi people and her father.

=== 2010: Star Academy ===
Riad became a recognizable name in the Arab world through her participation in Star Academy. She performed on stage with many Arab artists, including Assala, Latifa, Angham and Nawal El Zoghbi. She managed to reach the finale, together with Nassif Zeytoun, who was voted the winner, and Muhammad Ramadan, who took third place, while Riad became the runner-up. Riad reached a very large audience through her appearance on the program and got the highest percentage of votes cast for a contestant in danger of elimination in earlier stages.

=== 2011–2020: Breakthrough and Waed Menni ===
Her first work after the Star Academy was the single "Khlesna", which was in Lebanese Arabic and for which a music video was filmed in Lebanon. This was preceded by a special song for the AFC Asian Cup. She also released a song in the Gulf Arabic dialect titled "Moo Galata".

On 22 August 2018, she released the song "Waed Menni", written by Ramy Al-Aboudi and composed by Ali Saber. The song achieved great success, and its music video garnered about 150 million views in the two years after its release, thus becoming one of the most watched music videos on a YouTube channel for an artist from the Persian Gulf region and Iraq.

=== 2021–present: Iraq Idol, Athadakom and Al Kawkab ===
In January 2021, she joined the music contest Iraq Idol on MBC Iraq as a member of the judging panel. On 15 January 2021, Riad released the song "Athadakom", written by Aqil Al-Ard, composed by Ali Saber, and distributed by Maitham Alaa El-Din.

On 29 July 2021, Riad released the song "Al Kawkab", which garnered more than a million views on YouTube less than 24 hours after its release. The song was written by Maher Al-Azzawi, composed by Ali Saber, and distributed by Moheeb Al-Rawi.

In July 2021, MBC renewed Riad's contract for an additional season of Iraq Idol, which started in September.

In October 2022, she was chosen to feature in Light The Sky, a song for the 2022 FIFA World Cup in Qatar, collaborating with artists, RedOne, Manal, Balqees and Nora Fatehi.

== Personal life ==
On 23 May 2021, she announced her engagement to Iraqi actor Alexander Uloom. On 6 August 2021, they got married in a simple ceremony in the presence of their family and relatives. On March 26 2024, she announced the birth of her daughter Alya.

They live together in Iraq.

== Discography ==
- Er7moni Ya Alem
- Moo Galata
- Khlesna (2011)
- Ella Gillilhom (2012)
- Allah Kareem (2013)
- Bosa (2014)
- Anoudi (2015)
- Weinak (2016)
- Hade Hwe (2016)
- Waed Menni (2018)
- Mako Menni (2020)
- Ahki Maa Hali (2020)
- Athadakom (2021)
- Al Kawkab (2021)
- Asaad Lel Goumar (2022)
