= Pause Flow =

Moroccan rapper (born 1995)

Jawad Asradi (Arabic: جواد أسرادي; born 2 August 1995), better known by his stage name Pause Flow, or just Pause (stylized PAUSE), is a Moroccan rapper and songwriter. He raps in Darija (Moroccan Arabic), as well as Central Atlas Tamazight. He is known for his use of philosophy, politics, and the culture of the Atlas in his lyrics. Asradi is among the most known rappers in Morocco

== Early life ==
Jawad Asradi was born in Imouzzer Kandar, a small town in the Sefrou Province of Morocco. His father is an Amazigh poet, who is an inspiration to Pause.

== Career ==
Asradi has released four EPs: Solaris (2019), Metamorphose (2023), Zanda (2023), and 112 (2024). The latter centered on a personal experience involving his wife’s hospitalization, in which he "transformed [his] personal pain" into music and the audiences resonated with his "raw emotion[s]" and "thoughtful commentary".

== Prosecution over song lyrics ==
On 20 November 2025, Asradi was arrested in Sefrou on charges of insulting public officials performing their duties. The court of first instance refused to release him on bail. During his pre-trail detention, a group of Moroccan artists and civil society members, including prominent rappers like ElGrandeToto and Khtek (among over 4,680 signaturees), launched a petition calling for the release of rapper Asradi, who was being prosecuted over the lyrics of more than ten rap songs. The petition demands his release, an end to prosecutions for artistic expression, and a new legal framework to protect creativity without custodial penalties, citing Article 25 of the Moroccan Constitution which guarantees freedom of expression in all its forms. On December 25, 2025, Asradi was released from prison after the Sefrou Court of First Instance sentenced him to a three-month suspended prison term and a fine of 2,000 dirhams. He had spent one month in pre-trial detention after being denied bail.

During and after his trial, the case of Asradi became a point in the debate over artistic freedom in Morocco, especially that it came just after the Gen-Z protests in the country. Several figures, from artists to politicians weighted in, including MP Fatima Tamni (of the Federation of the Democratic Left), who submitted a written question to the Minister of Culture, Mehdi Bensaid, criticizing the rapper's imprisonment as part of a "policy of intimidation targeting Generation Z" and a "regression of rights and freedoms".

== Discography ==
Extended Plays (EPs)

- 112 (2024)
