= Moroccan hip-hop =

Music genre from Morocco

Moroccan hip-hop (also Moroccan rap) is a Moroccan musical style related to rap and hip hop culture. Hip-hop emerged in Morocco during the mid-1980s as an underground movement among urban youth, mostly in cities like Casablanca, Rabat and Meknes. Moroccan rap was influenced by French and American hip-hop and often integrated local musical traditions and sounds. Lyrics are predominantly performed in Darija, the Moroccan Arabic dialect, and to less extent in Tamazight and French, and frequently address themes such as social inequality, corruption, and political dissent. Rap music has grown into one of Morocco's most popular and influential musical styles, especially among the youth.

== History ==
=== Beginnings (mid 1980s – late 1990s) ===
Hip hop culture was introduced to Morocco in the mid-1980s, primarily through Moroccans living in Europe and the US, who returned home in the early 1980s and brought the new musicla style with them. Shams Dinn is widely cited as the first Moroccan rapper to perform in Darija, with an appearance recorded in 1985. Early pioneers spent subsequent years adapting the Western rap format to a local sound, developing a unique style that blended foreign influences with Moroccan linguistic and musical sensibilities.

The group Double A (Aminoffice and Ahmad), formed in Salé in 1995, is widely credited with releasing the first official Moroccan rap album, Wa9i3 (Reality), in 1996. Other foundational groups from this era include H-Kayne, formed in 1996 in Meknes, and Zanka Flow (Muslim and L3arbe), formed in 1998 in Tangier. The genre's expansion was facilitated by a political liberalization in the late 1990s with King Mohamed VI, which allowed new musical forms to flourish.

=== Growth and mainstream (2000–2010) ===
The early 2000s marked a period of rapid growth, largely driven by the internet. Community websites like dima-rap.com (2000), raptiviste.net, and rapmaroc.com created a centralized media window for the burgeoning scene. These portals were instrumental in promoting artists and culminated in the first major national rap compilation in 2003, featuring groups like Casa Crew, H-Kayne, and Don Bigg.

This period saw the rise of several influential groups: Casa Crew, formed in Casablanca in 1999 by Masta Flow, Chaht-Man, J-OK, and Caprice, gained national fame with their hit "Men Zanka L’zanka." The collective Piranha Labo, founded in Salé in 2003, brought together a new wave of lyrical rappers like Gamehdi, Netro, M-Psy, and Za3im.

Widad Mjama, known as Queen Thug of the group Thug Gang, became the first prominent female Moroccan rapper after winning the hip-hop category at the 2001 Boulevard des Jeunes Musiciens festival.

Following the 2003 Casablanca bombings, Moroccan rap took on a more pronounced social and, at times, patriotic tone. Hip-hop group Fnaire gained national recognition in 2004 following their release of "Mat9ich Bladi" (Don't Touch My Country), a solidarity song responding to the Casablanca bombings. The track received extensive airplay across Moroccan media platforms, including radio, television, and early internet channels.

Don Bigg's 2006 album Mgharba Tal Moute (Moroccans Until Death) became an anthem for a generation, using social commentary in Darija to critique corruption and societal issues. H-Kayne's 2005 album HK-1426 became the first Moroccan rap album to be sold internationally. Simultaneously, rappers like Muslim of Zanka Flow continued a more militant, socially conscious strand of rap, using his music to voice the frustrations of the youth. The success of these artists solidified Darija as the primary language of Moroccan hip hop.

== Characteristics and evolution ==
=== Nayda ===
Moroccan rap was a central component of the Nayda (or Hayha), a cultural renaissance movement in the 2000s that also included rock and fusion bands like Hoba Hoba Spirit, R&B artists like Ahmed Soultan, and rappers like Fnaire. Festivals like the Boulevard des Jeunes Musiciens in Casablanca provided a crucial platform for these artists to reach a wide audience.

=== Morap ===
Initially mirroring American boom-bap and French rap production, Moroccan hip hop has increasingly integrated traditional Moroccan music. In the 2020s, this fusion crystallized into a recognized subgenre often referred to as Morap.

Morap is characterized by the foundational use of traditional instruments like the gimbri, loutar, and percussion like taarija and bendir, often layered over hip-hop drum patterns. A key feature is the adoption of complex traditional rhythmic cycles, mainly 6/8, contrasting with the standard 4/4 time of Western hip-hop. The creation of "Morap type beats" has popularized this hybrid sound, providing a template for a new generation of artists.

=== Political rap ===
Political rap in Morocco has been marked by a series of legal cases involving artists whose work was critical of the state. One of the most significant early cases was that of L7a9d (Mouad Belaghouat), who rose to prominence after being imprisoned for lyrics critical of Morocco's King Mohammed VI and police corruption. His 2011 song "Kilab Al-Dawla" (Dogs of the State) led to a one-year sentence, a case that drew international attention to the use of penal codes to prosecute artistic expression. L7a9d faced subsequent arrests, including one in 2014 at a stadium on disputed charges of ticket scalping, which he denied, and another where police raided a library during his press conference. L7a9d was a symbol of the struggle for freedom of expression during the February 20, 2011 Movement and won several awards including the Index on Censorship and Izerfan Trophy for Human Rights. He sought asylum in Belgium and lived there since.

=== Female rappers ===
The scene has seen a growing presence of female artists since Widad Mjama's breakthrough. In recent years, rappers such as Manal, ILY, Soultana, Khtek, Frizzy, and Tendresse have gained prominence, challenging the male-dominated landscape and bringing new perspectives.

== Prominent rappers ==
This list does not encompass all influential Moroccan rappers but rather highlights some of the most prominent artists based on their widespread recognition, commercial reach, and critical acclaim. The included names have consistently appeared in rankings of Morocco's top rappers across multiple credible sources, reflecting their significant impact on the country's hip-hop scene.

=== Solo rappers ===
- 7liwa gained recognition in 2013 with his track "Da7k T9ada" and the popular single "Batal l3alam". 7liwa is considered one of the most influential rappers in Morocco.
- Don Bigg is considered a pioneer of Moroccan rap, beginning his career in 1997. Initially rapping in English, he switched to Darija, the Moroccan Arabic dialect, to connect with a wider audience, focusing his lyrics on social issues relevant to Moroccan youth such as poverty, crime, and corruption. He gained significant popularity with his debut album 'Mgharba Tal Moute' (2006).
- Dizzy DROS is a prominent Moroccan rapper who rose to fame with his 2011 music video "Casafonia". In 2013, he released his debut album 3azzy 3ando Stylo, considered one of the best albums in Moroccan hip-hop. His 2019 track "Moutanabbi" and 2023 track "M3a L3echrane" gained viral success. He won the award for Best Male Artist in North Africa at the 2021 AFRIMA awards.
- ElGrandeToto is a highly influential rapper known for blending Darija, French, Spanish, and English in his music. Starting his career in 2016, he quickly gained popularity with his song "Pute" (2017) and his 2018 EP "Illicit". His debut album "Caméléon" (2021) achieved significant international recognition, ranking among the top global album debuts on Spotify. ElGrandeToto was the most streamed artist in the MENA region on Spotify in 2021. He has received awards such as the MTV Europe Music Award for Best African Act.
- Fat Mizzo is known for his distinctive style and lyrical skills. He has gained popularity with tracks like 'Dunk' (2012) and 'Kan Drik' (2029). His music often heavy inspirations from American music with classic hip-hop beats, touching on themes of braggadocio and daily life.
- Inkonnu is known for his unique style and complex flow patterns. Inkonnu was a member of the group A6 Gang before pursuing a solo career. His 2021 album 'Arabi' showcased his blend of traditional North African rhythms with modern trap elements and is considered one of the best Moroccan rap albums.
- L'Morphine is a Moroccan rapper known for his distinctive style of 'deep lyrics' and massive influence on the Moroccan rap scene. He has released several successful projects such as 'Gala' (2022) and 'Yakine' (2024).
- Mobydick gained recognition after the 2006 Boulevard Casablanca festival with his track 'Toc Toc'. Known for his lyrical content and stage presence, he has released projects like 'Lmoutchou Family'. He often raps in Darija and has a significant following among Moroccan youth.
- Madd is an artist, musician, songwriter, and composer from Safi. He blends hip-hop and R&B with Moroccan sounds, he has gained recognition for tracks like '3310', 'Ey Ey Ey' and 'Karma'. Madd released his debut solo album 'Black Rose' in 2020, featuring collaborations with artists like Lacrim and Laylow. He was also part of the Naar collective.
- Muslim is a prominent figure in Moroccan rap. He started rapping in mid-1990s and formed the group Zanka Flow in 1998. Muslim is known for his socially conscious rap style, drawing inspiration from 90s American rap and addressing issues like immigration, delinquency, and government mismanagement in his lyrics.
- Nessyou is known for his creative rhyme schemes and bars. He started rapping at a young age, influenced by French rap, and released his first project 'Anormal' (2015) and 'ATMSPR' (2022), which is ranked amongst the best rap albums. His lyrics often contain social commentary and showcase his wordplay, appealing to a dedicated fanbase.
- PAUSE is known for his thought-provoking lyrics and enigmatic personality. He has been rapping since 2009 and has released several projects like 'Solaris' (2019), 'Metamorphose' (2023) and '112' (2024) to massive success.
- Stormy is known for his catchy flows and melodies. He gained initial fame with tracks like 'Africain' and 'Si Tu Savais' Ft. Anys. Stormy has released projects like the collaborative album 'Jackpot' (2021) with Tagne and his solo debut album 'Iceberg' (2024), considered one of the best albums. He often blends different genres in his music like Brazilian Funk and local Moroccan instruments.

=== Rap groups ===
This selection focuses on the most impactful rap groups in Morocco, chosen for their cultural influence, commercial success, and enduring legacy.

- 3awd Lil are the enigma of Moroccan rap as nobody knowns who they are but everybody knows at least one of their songs.
- Double A is a Moroccan hip hop duo formed by Aminoffice and Ahmed in 1995 in Salé. They are considered by many to be the first rap group in Morocco, the first act to officially release an album, 'Wa9i3' in 1996, and the first Moroccan rappers broadcast on local TV, 1997.
- Casa Crew is a Moroccan rap group formed by Caprice, Masta Flow, Chaht-Man, and J-OK in Casablanca in 1999. They are considered one of the most impactful rap groups in Moroccan rap scene.
- H-Kayne is a Moroccan rap group consisting of Sif Lssan, HB2, Ter 7or, Othman Benhami, and DJ Khaled, founded in 1996 in Meknes, a city considered one of the "cradles of Moroccan hip-hop". They are widely considered to be the most influential rap group of both their generation and of all time in Morocco.
- Shayfeen is a Moroccan hip-hop duo formed by Shobee (Chouaib Ribati) and Small X (Abdessamad Lamriq) in 2006 in Safi. They gained recognition for their energetic flows and lyrics centered on ambition and motivation. Following their performance at Génération Mawazine in 2012, they released their debut mixtape 'Energie'. Their 2016 EP '07' and the hit collaborative track 'Tcha Ra' with ElGrandeToto and others in 2018 further boosted their popularity.
- Zanka Flow is a Moroccan rap group from Tangier formed by Muslim and L3arbe in 1998. The group had immense influence on the undergraduate rap movement in late 90s and early 2000s.

== Bibliography ==
- Lamarkbi, N., Fièvre hip-hop au Maroc in Jeune Afrique, 16/10/2006, https://www.jeuneafrique.com/216144/archives-thematique/fi-vre-hip-hop-au-maroc/
- Abu Ghanim, K., 2009, Les changements de la nouvelle musique jeune au Maroc (in Arabic), Université Mohamed V, Agdal, Rabat.
- Guerrero Parado, J. (2012). Zanka Flow: Rap en árabe marroquí. In Romano-Arabica 12, pp. 125–157
- Gintsburg, Sarali (2013). I'll spit my rap for y'all... in darija: Local and global in Moroccan hip hop culture. In Evolution des pratiques et représentations langagières dans le Maroc du 21e siècle (Vol 2), Benítez-Fernández, M., Miller, C. de Ruiter, J and Tamer, Y. (Eds), 186–207. Paris, L’Harmattan.

== See also ==
- Moroccan music
- Arabic hip hop
- Culture of Morocco
