= Reggada =

Genre of music

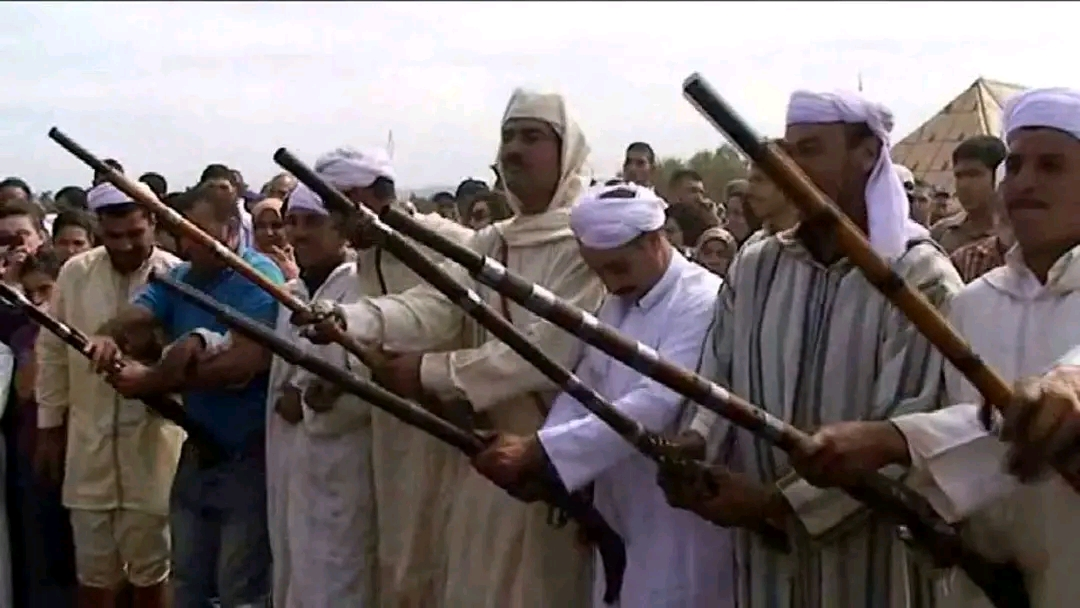
- Reggada dance
- Native name: الرڭادة
- Stylistic origins: Moroccan music
- Cultural origins: Amazigh Tribes
- Typical instruments: Traditional instruments Adjounn, Tamja, Galal, Ghaita, Zamar and modern: synthesizer

Other topics
- Moroccan music

Reggada is a traditional dance and musical genre of Morocco specific to the Amazigh tribes of the north-east (provinces of Oujda, Berkane and Taourirt).

== History ==
Reggada is a derivation of war dance tradition found amaong Amazigh tribes celebrating victory over their enemies. Thus, the performance includes the use of weapons/moukahla (rifles) and foot strikes in the rhythm of music.

=== Location ===
Reggada music is most commonly played in the northeastern regions of Morocco. It is popular in provinces such as Oujda, Taourirt and Berkane.

== Dance and music ==
This war dance uses instruments such as Bendir, Ghaita and Zammar which is a kind of flute with two horns typically found in Africa. The dancers move their shoulders, a rifle or a stick and strike the groin against the floor to the rhythm of drums.

The music often tells stories about topics such as love, emotions of sadness and happiness. From the late 1980s, music synthesizer are increasingly widely used. Other forms of the same dance are found in Algeria and Libya.
