= Fnaire =

Moroccan hip-hop group

- Origin: Marrakesh, Morocco
- Genres: Rap; moroccan hip-hop
- Occupations: Rappers; singers; producer
- Instruments: Vocals; bendir; sintir; krakeb
- Years active: 2001-present
- Members: Mohcine Tizaf; Khalifa Mennani; Achraf Aarab
- Past members: Hicham Belkas (deceased); Dj Van

Fnaire (Arabic: فناير) is a Moroccan hip-hop group originating from Marrakech, established in 2001. The group originally consisted of four members: Mohcine Tizaf (lead vocalist and songwriter), Khalifa Mennani (composer and vocalist) Achraf Aarab (vocalist and business manager), and Hicham Belqas (died in 2008). The group's name in Arabic means "the lanterns."

Fnaire gained national recognition in 2004 following their release of "Mat9ich Bladi" (Don't Touch My Country), a solidarity anthem responding to the May 16 Casablanca bombings. The track received extensive airplay across Moroccan media platforms, including radio, television, and early internet channels. This exposure led to invitations to perform at major cultural events such as: The Casablanca Festival, Timitar Festival and Gnaoua World Music Festival. They also performed at the 44th Marrakech Popular Arts Festival in 2009.

In 2013, Fnaire became one of the first (and only) hip-hop acts to receive the prestigious royal decoration Order of Ouissam Alaouite by Morocco's King Mohammed VI. Fnaire expanded their global profile through "Arabic Dilbar", a collaboration with Canadian-Moroccan star Nora Fatehi, released via India’s T-Series. The track became a cross-continental hit, with its music video surpassing 170 million YouTube views as of June 2025, marking it the group’s most successful international venture to date.

== Biography ==
Originally established by Khalil Belqas (known as DJ Van), the lineup changed when his cousin Hicham Belqas replaced him. The latter, then 25 years old, died in a traffic accident in Fez in 2008. The news of his passing was broadcast nationally on 2M. This tragedy permanently altered the group's composition, reducing Fnaire from a quartet to its current trio lineup.

== Career ==
Fnaire rose to prominence with their 2004 debut album Lafthouh, which blended traditional Moroccan music with Western rap styles. Notable tracks included "Bahjawy" and "Tonea Biladi". Their 2007 follow-up Yad El Henna (Hand of Henna) became a success in Morocco and around the MENA region, featuring collaborations with Moroccan singer Samira Saïd, and Wu Tang member Cilvaringz, with viral tracks like "Yad El Henna", "Sah Raoui", "Mogadore" and "Lalla Mannana".

Fnaire has partnered with several prominent artists throughout their career, like Algerian singer Cheb Bilal on "Qoulih Qoulih" (Tell Him, Tell Him, 2007), a musical initiative promoting Moroccan-Algerian unity amid border reopening discussions. Their work with Moroccan-Egyptian star Samira Saïd on "Be Winner" (2010) proved particularly transformative, significantly expanding their reach across the Arab world and internationally. This crossover success earned them the Africa Music Award. In 2012, they released their third album Al Basma (the Fingerprint) to moderate success.

In 2013, Morocco's King Mohammed VI honored the group with the Order of Ouissam Alaouite, one of Morocco's highest civilian distinctions, making them one of the very few hip-hop acts to earn it. In 2016, Fnaire composed and performed an environmental anthem for the COP22 climate summit in Marrakech, presented before King Mohammed VI.

Fnaire made history in 2017 as the first Moroccan rap group to perform during the NBA All-Star Game halftime show. The group appeared at the game between the Orlando Magic and Brooklyn Nets. Their performance featured a fusion of traditional Moroccan sounds with contemporary hip-hop, showcasing the group's signature taqlidi rap style to an international audience.

In 2018, the group collaborated with Canadian-Moroccan dancer Nora Fatehi on the single "Arabic Dilbar", released by T-Series. As of April 2025, the video has been seen by over 160 million views. The track was composed by Mohcine Tizaf, written by Khalifa Mennani and Ashraf Aarab, and choreographed by Caesar Gonsalves.

In 2019, they performed at Mawazine, considered the biggest and most important music festival in Africa and one of the biggest worldwide.

== Impact ==
Fnaire, along with H-Kayne, pioneered a distinctive fusion sound by blending Western rap with diverse Moroccan musical traditions, incorporating elements from Marrakesh folk, Issawa, Sahrawi, and Amazigh music. Their innovative approach led to the creation of Ta9lidi rap (Traditional rap), recognized as the foundational style of what later evolved into the broader Moroccan hip-hop subgenre known as Morap. This groundbreaking style is characterized by its seamless integration of traditional Moroccan instruments with contemporary global rap production techniques, establishing Fnaire as pioneers in the Moroccan music scene.

== Discography ==
Albums

- Laftouh (2004)
- Yed El Henna (2007)
- Al Basma (2012)

== See also ==
- Moroccan hip-hop
- Music of Morocco
