= Zanka Flow =

Pioneering Moroccan hip hop duo

- Origin: Tangier, Morocco
- Genres: Moroccan hip hop, Hardcore hip hop
- Years active: 1998–2006 (hiatus)
- Past members: Muslim; L3arbé

Zanka Flow (Arabic: زنقة فلو) was a seminal Moroccan hip hop duo from Tangier, formed in 1998. The group consisted of rappers Muslim and L3arbé. They are widely regarded as the pioneers of "hardcore" rap in North Africa and were instrumental in the development of the "Northern School" of Moroccan hip hop.

== History ==
=== Formation and social impact ===
Formed in the popular neighborhoods of Tangier, Zanka Flow emerged during a period of cultural transition in Morocco. Unlike the more melodic rap groups of the era, Zanka Flow utilized a dark, aggressive style known as "Hardcore" to voice the grievances of the urban youth. Their lyrics, delivered in the Tangier dialect of Moroccan Arabic (Darija), addressed themes of poverty, political corruption, and the struggles of the "Zanka" (the street).

=== Kachela Collective ===
The duo was the central pillar of the Kachela collective, an independent production movement that aimed to bypass mainstream media barriers. Through Kachela, they released several influential projects, establishing an underground distribution network that defined the Northern Moroccan rap scene for a decade.

=== Legacy and solo careers ===
Zanka Flow released three studio albums : Tanjawa Daba (2001), Jebha (2004), and Dem w Dmou3 (2006), which are now considered classics of the genre. Although the group entered a hiatus after 2006, their influence persisted. Muslim transitioned into one of the most successful solo artists in the Arab world, while L3arbé continued to represent the underground boom-bap aesthetic.

== Discography ==
- Tanjawa Daba (2001)
- Jebha (2004)
- Dem w Dmou3 (2006)
- 9amous Zna9i (Compilation)
