= Nora Fatehi =

Canadian singer, dancer, and actress (born 1992)

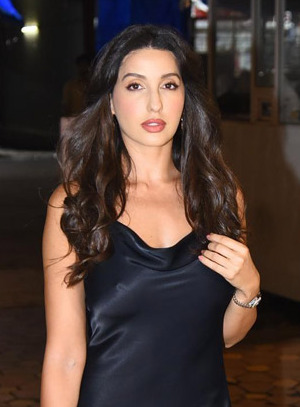
- Fatehi in 2023
- Born: Naura Fathi; 6 February 1992 (age 34); Toronto, Ontario, Canada
- Occupations: Dancer; actress; singer
- Years active: 2014–present

Nora Fatehi (born Naura Fathi; 6 February 1992) is a Canadian singer, dancer and actress based in India. She primarily works in Hindi film and also appeared in Telugu, and Malayalam cinema. Fatehi made her acting debut with the Hindi film Roar: Tigers of the Sundarbans.

Fatehi gained popularity in Telugu films for her special appearance songs in films like Temper, Baahubali: The Beginning and Kick 2 and has also starred in two Malayalam films, Double Barrel and Kayamkulam Kochunni. In 2015, Fatehi participated as a contestant on the reality television show Bigg Boss. In 2016, she was a participant in the reality television dance show Jhalak Dikhhla Jaa. She appeared in the Bollywood film Satyameva Jayate where she was featured in the recreated version of the song "Dilbar" and the song crossed 20 million views on YouTube in the first 24 hours of its release, making it the first Hindi song to achieve such numbers in India. She also collaborated with the Moroccan hip-hop group Fnaïre to release an Arabic version of the "Dilbar" song.

In 2019, she collaborated with Tanzanian musician and songwriter Rayvanny to release her first international English debut song Pepeta.

In October 2022, Fatehi featured alongside Balqees, Manal and Rahma Riad on "Light The Sky", a song produced by RedOne for the official soundtrack of the 2022 FIFA World Cup. She performed the song at the tournament's closing ceremony in Qatar. Fatehi returned for the 2026 FIFA World Cup, performing "Siir Siir" with Vegedream and Sanjoy at the opening ceremony in Toronto, Canada, on 12 June 2026. The song appeared on the tournament's official soundtrack.

Like Shakira and Jung Kook of BTS, Fatehi has performed at more than one edition of the FIFA World Cup, appearing at the 2022 closing ceremony in Qatar and the 2026 opening ceremony in Toronto.

Fatehi has since played supporting parts in Hindi films Street Dancer 3D (2020) and Bhuj: The Pride of India (2021). She has also judged television shows Dance Deewane Juniors and Jhalak Dikhhla Jaa 10.

== Early life ==
Fatehi was born and raised in Toronto, Canada, and is of Moroccan descent from both her father's and mother’s side. She graduated from Westview Centennial Secondary School in Toronto. She studied political science and international relations at York University. She has stated in interviews that she considers herself "an Indian at heart."

== Career ==
=== Debut and dancing roles (2014–2019) ===
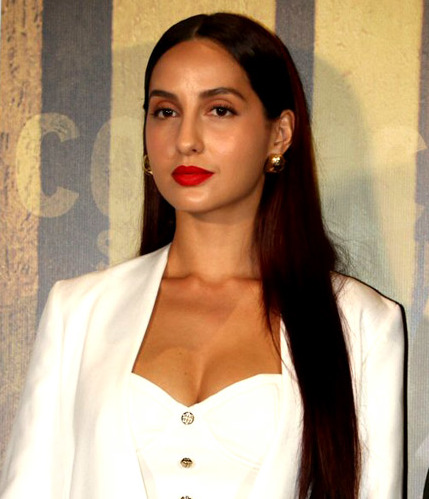
Fatehi at the trailer launch of Batla House

Nora Fatehi began her career with her debut appearance in the Hindi film Roar: Tigers of the Sundarbans. She played CJ, in her acting debut. She then ventured into Telugu films with item number, "Ittage Recchipodham", in Puri Jagannadh's film Temper. She also made a special appearance in the film Mr. X directed by Vikram Bhatt and produced by Mahesh Bhatt, alongside Emraan Hashmi and Gurmeet Choudhary. Fatehi further appeared in item numbers for films such as Baahubali: The Beginning's song "Manohari" and in Kick 2's song "Kukkurukuru".

In late June 2015, she signed a Telugu film Sher. In late August 2015, she signed a Telugu film Loafer which is directed by Puri Jagannadh starring opposite Varun Tej. She also appeared as an item number in Karthi's Bilingual film Oopiri/Thozha in late November 2015. In December 2015, Fatehi entered the Bigg Boss house as a wild card entrant in the ninth season. She spent 3 weeks inside the house before getting evicted in the 12th week (Day 83). She also participated in the reality television show Jhalak Dikhhla Jaa 9 in 2016. She starred in the film My Birthday Song as the lead actress opposite Sanjay Suri.

In February 2019, Fatehi signed an exclusive artist agreement with T-Series. In the same year, she appeared in Batla House, in the song "O Saki O Saki" and in Marjaavaan in the song "Ek Toh Kum Zindagani". Fatehi then played Suzan Vilayati Khan opposite Sunil Grover, in Bharat.

=== Expansion to acting roles (2020–present) ===
Fatehi played Mia, a dancer in the 2020 dance film Street Dancer 3D, opposite Varun Dhawan. On 6 March 2021, Fatehi became the first African-Arab female artiste whose song "Dilbar" crossed one billion views on YouTube. She also made her international single debut with the song "Dirty Little Secret" in collaboration with Zack Knight which was subsequently performed by her in the 22nd IIFA Awards. In that year, she played a spy Heena in Bhuj: The Pride of India, replacing Parineeti Chopra.

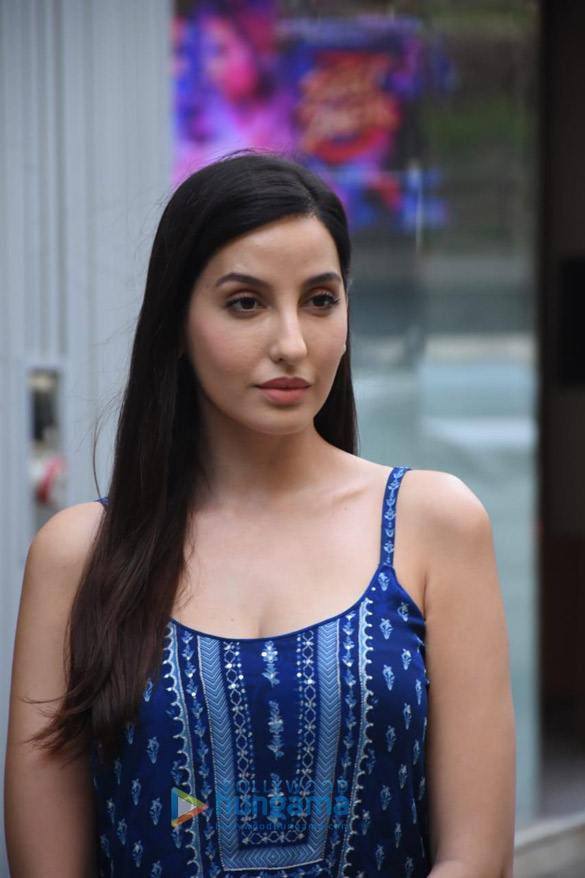
Fatehi in 2022

In 2022, Fatehi made appearances in the song "Manike" for the film Thank God, sung by Yohani, which is a remix of the original Sri Lankan song "Manike Mange Hite". She also appeared in the song "Jehda Nasha" from the film An Action Hero alongside Ayushman Khuranna. In the same year she gave a performance in the closing ceremony of the 2022 FIFA World Cup. She also took on the role of a judge in dance shows like the first season of Dance Deewane Juniors and Jhalak Dikhhla Jaa 10 alongside other judges. In 2023, she made an appearance in the song "Achha Sila Diya" alongside Rajkummar Rao after her collaboration with him in the song "Kamariya" for the film Stree in 2018. The song, composed and sung by B Praak with lyrics by Jaani, is a recreation of the film song "Achha Sila Diya Tune Mere Pyar Ka" which was featured in the 1995 Hindi film Bewafa Sanam.

In February 2024, she signed with Warner Music Group for international music projects while continuing her association with T-Series for Bollywood work.

In 2024, Fatehi took on more acting roles. She appeared as Alia, a social media influencer, in Crakk opposite Vidyut Jammwal. The film received negative reviews and Monika Rawal Kukreja of Hindustan Times stated, "Nora is used as a mere prop and even though her character arc takes the story forward, she doesn't get ample scope to perform." Fatehi next played Tasha, opposite Divyenndu in Kunal Khemu's directorial debut Madgaon Express. Mayur Sanap from Rediff.com noted, "For a change, Nora Fatehi gets a legit role to play and she is suitably affable."

In 2025, Fatehi collaborated with Jason Derulo on "Snake", which spent two weeks at number one on the UK's Official Asian Music Chart and peaked at number 97 on the Official Streaming Chart.

On 12 June 2026, Fatehi and French singer Vegedream performed "Siir Siir", an official FIFA World Cup 2026 song, which was included on the official soundtrack, at the second opening ceremony of the 2026 FIFA World Cup in Toronto, Canada. In 2026, Fatehi also released “Slay to the Rhythm” from her EP Play, following the singles “Champions” and “Locked In”.

== Media image ==
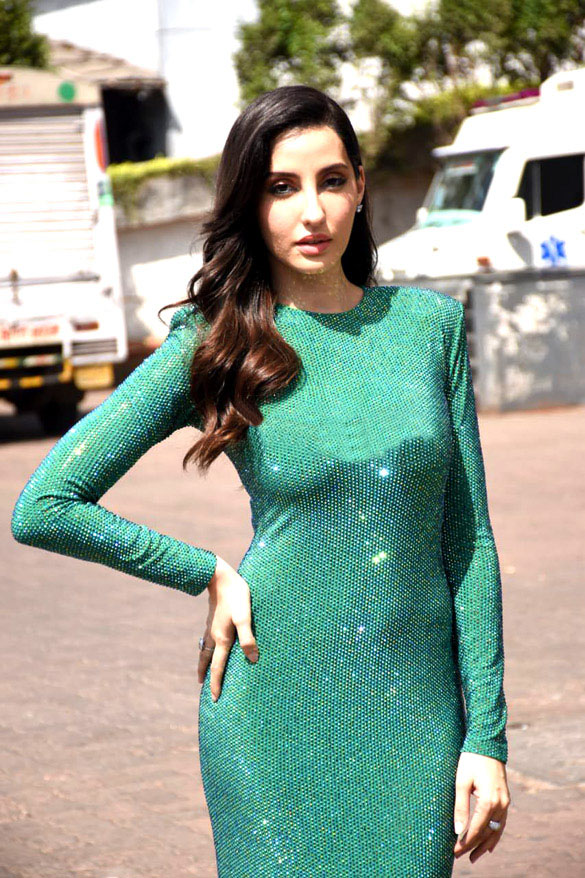
Fatehi in 2022, on the sets of Dance Deewane

Vedanshi Pathak of Filmfare noted, "One song after the other, Fatehi proved that there is no one in the industry who can dance with such conviction and look appealing while doing so." She is an endorser for brands such as Dabur and CakeZone. Fatehi became the only actress to perform the second time at the IIFA Awards in 2023. In March 2023, Fatehi performed in various cities in the United States for "The Entertainers" tour, alongside Akshay Kumar, Disha Patani, Mouni Roy, Sonam Bajwa, Aparshakti Khurana, Stebin Ben and Zahrah S. Khan.

== Filmography ==
Key
†	Denotes films that have not yet been released

=== Films ===
Year	Title	Role(s)	Language(s)	Notes	Ref.
2014	Roar: Tigers of the Sundarbans	CJ	Hindi		
2015	Crazy Cukkad Family	Amy	Hindi		
2015	Temper	Herself	Telugu	Special appearance in song "Ittage Rechchipodam"	
2015	Mr. X	Herself	Hindi	Special appearance in song "Alif Se"	
2015	Double Barrel	Herself	Malayalam	Special appearance	
2015	Baahubali: The Beginning	Unnamed	Telugu / Tamil	Special appearance in song "Manohari / Manogari"	
2015	Kick 2	Herself	Telugu	Special appearance in song "Kukkurukuru Kick"	
2015	Sher	Herself	Telugu	Special appearance in song "Napere Pinky"	
2015	Loafer	Herself	Telugu	Special appearance in song "Nokkey Dochey"	
2016	Rocky Handsome	Herself	Hindi	Special appearance in song "Rock Tha Party"	
2016	Oopiri	Nemali	Telugu	Special appearance in song "Door Number Okati"	
2016	Thozha	Nemili	Tamil	Special appearance in song "Door Number One"	
2018	My Birthday Song	Sandy	Hindi		
2018	Satyameva Jayate	Unnamed	Hindi	Special appearance in song "Dilbar"	
2018	Stree	Unnamed Betal	Hindi	Special appearance in song "Kamariya"	
2018	Kayamkulam Kochuni	Herself	Malayalam	Special appearance in song "Nrithageethikalennum"	
2019	Bharat	Suzan Vilayati Khan	Hindi		
2019	Batla House	Huma / Victoria	Hindi	Special appearance in song "O Saki O Saki"	
2019	Marjaavaan	Herself	Hindi	Special appearance in song "Ek Toh Kum Zindagani"	
2020	Street Dancer 3D	Mia	Hindi		
2021	Bhuj: The Pride of India	Heena Rehman	Hindi		
2021	Satyameva Jayate 2	Dilruba	Hindi	Special appearance in song "Kusu Kusu"	
2022	Thank God	Herself	Hindi	Special appearance in song "Manike"	
2022	An Action Hero	Herself	Hindi	Special appearance in song "Jehda Nasha"	
2024	Crakk	Alia	Hindi		
2024	Madgaon Express	Tasha	Hindi		
2024	Matka	Sofia	Telugu		
2025	Be Happy	Maggi	Hindi		
2025	Ufff Yeh Siyapaa	Kamini	Hindi		
2025	Thamma	Unknown Betal (referred as "Queen of Chanderi")	Hindi	Special appearance in song "Dilbar Ki Aankhon Ka"	
2026	KD: The Devil	Senorita	Kannada		
2026	Jailer 2	TBA	Tamil	Special appearance in song "Bindaas"	
2026	Kanchana 4 †	TBA	Tamil	Filming	

=== Television ===
Year	Title	Role	Notes	Ref.
2015–2016	Bigg Boss 9	Contestant	9th place	
2016	Jhalak Dikhhla Jaa 9	Contestant	10th place	
2018	MTV Dating in the Dark	Host		
2022	Dance Deewane Juniors 1	Herself	Judge	
2022	Jhalak Dikhhla Jaa 10	Herself	Judge	
2023	Hip Hop India 1	Herself	Judge	

=== Web series ===
Year	Title	Role	Notes	Ref.
2021	Star vs Food (Season 2)	Herself	Episode 5	
2022	Moving In With Malaika	Herself	Episode 7	
2025	The Royals	Ayesha Dhondi	4 episodes	

=== Music video appearances ===
Year	Title	Singer(s)	Ref.
2017	"Pop the Bottle"	Vishal Dadlani, Shekhar Ravjiani, Akasa Singh, Badshah	
2017	"Naah"	Harrdy Sandhu	
2017	"Baby Marvake Maanegi"	Raftaar	
2018	"Dilbar Arabic Version"	Herself, Fnaïre	
2019	"Pachtaoge"	Arijit Singh	
2019	"Pepeta"	Herself, Rayvanny	
2020	"Pachtaoge" (Female version)	Asees Kaur	
2020	"Naach Meri Rani"	Guru Randhawa, Nikhita Gandhi	
2020	"Body" (Dance Cover)	Megan Thee Stallion	
2021	"Chhor Denge"	Parampara Tandon	
2021	"Dance Meri Rani"	Guru Randhawa, Zahrah S Khan	
2023	"Achha Sila Diya"	B Praak	
2024	"Zaalim"	Payal Dev, Badshah	
2024	"Payal"	Yo Yo Honey Singh, Paradox	
2024	"Aaye Haaye"	Karan Aujla, Neha Kakkar	

== Discography ==
=== Singles ===
==== As lead artist ====
List of singles as lead artist, with selected chart positions, showing year released and album name
Title	Year	Peak chart positions			Album
Title	Year	UK			Album
Title	Year	UK Asian	UK Afro	UK Streaming	Album
"Dilbar Arabic Version" (with Fnaire)	2018	8	*	—	Non-album singles
"Pepeta" (with Rayvanny)	2019	—	*	—	Non-album singles
"Dirty Little Secret" (with Zack Knight)	2022	9	—	—	Non-album singles
"Light The Sky" (with Balqees, Rahma Riad & Manal)	2022	—	—	—	FIFA World Cup Qatar 2022 Official Soundtrack
"Sexy In My Dress"	2023	—	—	—	Non-album singles
"Im Bossy"	2023	—	—	—	Non-album singles
"Who's Your Mommy" (with Srushti Tawade & Sameer Uddin)	2024	—	—	—	Madgaon Express
"Body On Me" (with Badshah)	2024	—	—	—	Ek Tha Raja
"NORA"	2024	—	—	—	Non-album single
"It's True" (with CKay)	2024	—	—	—	Emotions
"Snake" (with Jason Derulo)	2025	1	—	97	Non-album singles
"Sultana" (with Sunidhi Chauhan & Mika Singh)	2025	—	—	—	Be Happy
"Oh Mama! TETEMA" (with Shreya Ghoshal & Rayvanny)	2025	12	19	—	Non-album singles
"I'm So Rich" (with Yo Yo Honey Singh)	2025	—	—	—	51 Glorious Days
"What Do I Know? (Just a Girl)" (with Shenseea)	2025	—	—	—	Non-album single
"New Year Party Mashup 2025"	2025	—	—	—	Non-album single
"Aaye Haaye (Afro Mix)"	2025	—	—	—	Non-album single
"Sajan Re" (with Badshah)	2026	—	—	—	Non-album single
"Body Roll" (with Yo Yo Honey Singh)	2026	—	—	—	Non-album single
"Siir Siir" (with Vegedream & Sanjoy)	2026	—	—	—	Official FIFA World Cup 2026 Album
"Ya Baba" (with Shilpa Rao)	2026	—	—	—	Non-album single
"Champions"	2026	—	—	—	Non-album single
"Locked In"	2026	—	—	—	Non-album single
"Slay To The Rhythm" (with Sanjoy and MA3IZ)	2026	23	—	—	Play
"Desh Mere Remix"	2026	—	—	—	Non-album single
"—" denotes a recording that did not chart or was not released in that territory. "*" denotes the chart did not exist at that time.

== Awards and nominations ==
Year	Award	Category	Result	Ref.
2023	Pinkvilla Style Icons Awards	Fashion Trailblazer	Won	
2023	Bollywood Hungama Style Icons	Most Stylish Glam Star	Nominated	

== See also ==
- List of dancers
