= Manal (singer) =

Moroccan singer-songwriter (born 1993)

Manal منال
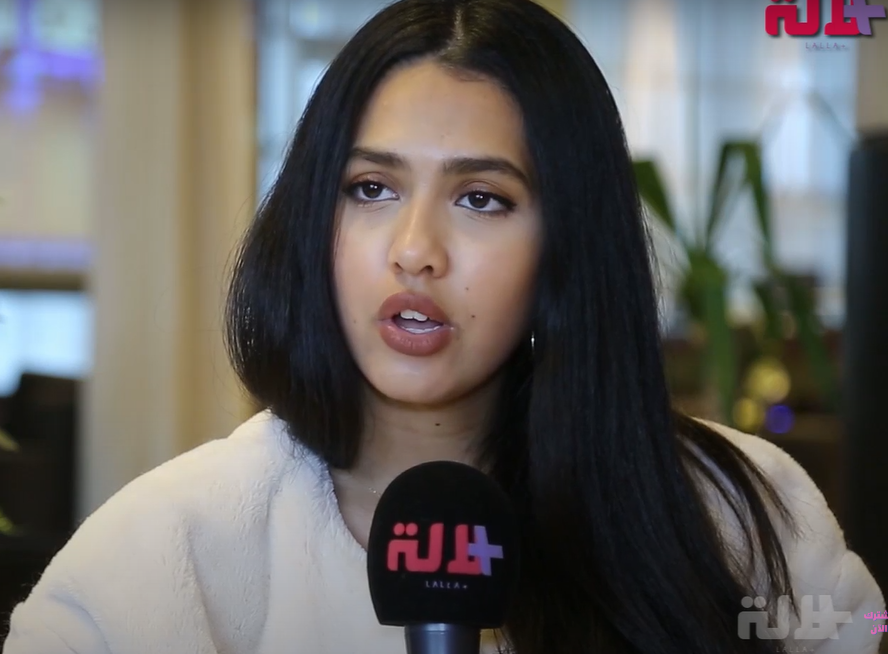
- Manal in 2018

Background information
- Also known as: Manal BK
- Born: Manal Benchlikha منال بنشليخة; 18 September 1993 (age 33); Marrakesh, Morocco
- Genres: Pop; R&B; rap; Moroccan pop
- Occupations: Singer; songwriter
- Instruments: Vocals; guitar
- Years active: 2015–present
- Labels: Bench & Guess Entertainment; RCA; Sony Music

Manal Benchlikha (Arabic: منال بنشليخة; born 18 September 1993), better known mononymously as Manal, is a Moroccan singer-songwriter. Since her debut in 2015, she has risen to prominence. Manal has released two studio albums: 360 (2021) and Arabian Heartbreak (2024).

== Biography ==
Manal grew up in Marrakesh where she studied business and finance. Having always wanted to be a musical artist, she posted covers on YouTube and was discovered by Hamza Ait Khali, the partner of Moroccan producer DJ Van.

After a short stint with DJ Van's label Magic Castle Entertainment and the release of her debut single Denia, which earned her the 'Best Female Artist in Northern Africa' award at the Africa Music Awards in 2015, she switched management to Tarik Azzougarh, better known as Cilvaringz, producer and conceptualizer of the world's most expensive musical work ever sold, Wu-Tang Clan's Once Upon A Time in Shaolin.

Manal followed up her debut single with her song Koulchi Ban, the last song she would do with DJ Van. The release of Koulchi Ban received critical acclaim from fans and sparked the interest of Sony Music Middle East. In October 2017, Manal became one of the first Moroccan artists to sign to a major label in the Arab world.

In February 2018, Manal released her third single Taj (Crown). Due to its music video and a significant departure from Manal's signature sound, Taj started a buzz and garnered millions of views quickly. It is one of the most viewed Arabic rap songs performed by a female artist. After Taj, Manal released the song Nah featuring Moroccan rap duo Shayfeen and then had one of her biggest singles to date, Slay, in collaboration with ElGrandeToto.

In November 2019, Manal signed a distribution deal with RCA Records, a division of Sony Music France, through her record company Bench & Guess Entertainment.

Currently, she is under an exclusive license agreement with the same label, and under a music publishing agreement with Universal Music Publishing.

Manal's current management team includes Anissa Jalab, former manager of Belgian rapper Damso, head of Wagram Belgium, and also manager of ElGrandeToto.

In May 2021, Manal released her first album titled 360, which included the hit single "Niya".

Deprived of the stage during the COVID-19 pandemic, she launched, with the help of her husband Moncef Guessous, a streetwear brand called Bari & Soch.

In November 2021, Manal earned the 'Best Female Artist in Northern Africa' award at the 2021 All Africa Music Awards for the second time in her career.

In May 2022, Manal performed "3ARI" for COLORS. In October 2022, she was chosen to feature in Light The Sky, a song for the 2022 FIFA World Cup in Qatar, collaborating with artists, RedOne, Balqees, Rahma Riad and Nora Fatehi.

== Discography ==
=== Albums ===
Title	Released	Record label
360	21 May 2021	Bench & Guess Entertainment / Sony Music France
Arabian Heartbreak	20 Sept 2024	Bench & Guess Entertainment / Sony Music France

=== Singles ===
List of singles as a lead artist, with selected chart positions, showing year released and album name
Title	Year	Album
"Dua"	2014	Non-album singles
"Koulchi Ban"	2017	Non-album singles
"Taj"	2018	Non-album singles
"Nah" (featuring Shayfeen)	2018	Non-album singles
"Slay" (featuring ElGrandeToto)	2018	Non-album singles
"Pas Le Choix"	2019	Non-album singles
"NTA"	2019	Non-album singles
"360"	2020	360
"Niya"	2020	360
"Lyali"	2021	Non-album singles
"3iytou Lbouliss"	2021	360
"Call Me"	2021	360

=== Other appearances ===
List of other appearances, with selected chart positions, showing year released and album name
Title	Year	Peak chart positions	Album	
Title	Year	LBN	Album	
"Mantsayadch" (DJ Van featuring Ahmed Soultan, Dizzy Dros, Manal, Muslim & Shayfeen)	2014	—	Non-album singles	
"Tarikhona Fakhrona" (Soundtrack of the series "Tarikhona Fakhrona" on Medi 1 TV)	2015	—	Non-album singles	
"Ana Mani Fiyach" (with Masta Flow; 2015 Moroccan Music Awards original performance)	2015	—	Non-album singles	
"Sans Toi" (La Relève Deezer)	2020	—	Non-album singles	
"Lonely Days" (Draganov featuring Manal)	2020	—	Galess Fdar	
"Safe Salina (Moroccan Remix)" (Tawsen featuring Manal and ElGrandeToto)	2020	—	Non-album singles	
"Pas Le Choix - Manal Mix" (Now United Remix)	2020	—	Non-album singles	
"Lyali" Soundtrack of the series "Dayzou Lakwam" on 2M)	2021	—	Non-album singles	
"Maak" (Tagne featuring Manal)	2022	—	Non-album singles	
"Zina" (Slimane featuring Manal)	2022	—	Chroniques d'un cupidon	
"Waray" (Issam Alnajjar and R3hab featuring Manal)	2023	1	Waray (EP)	—
"Kentili" (zeyne featuring Manal)	2026	—		
Non-album singles	2026			
"—" denotes a recording that did not chart or was not released in that territory.
