= Old Abattoirs =

- المسالخ القديمة; Anciens Abattoirs
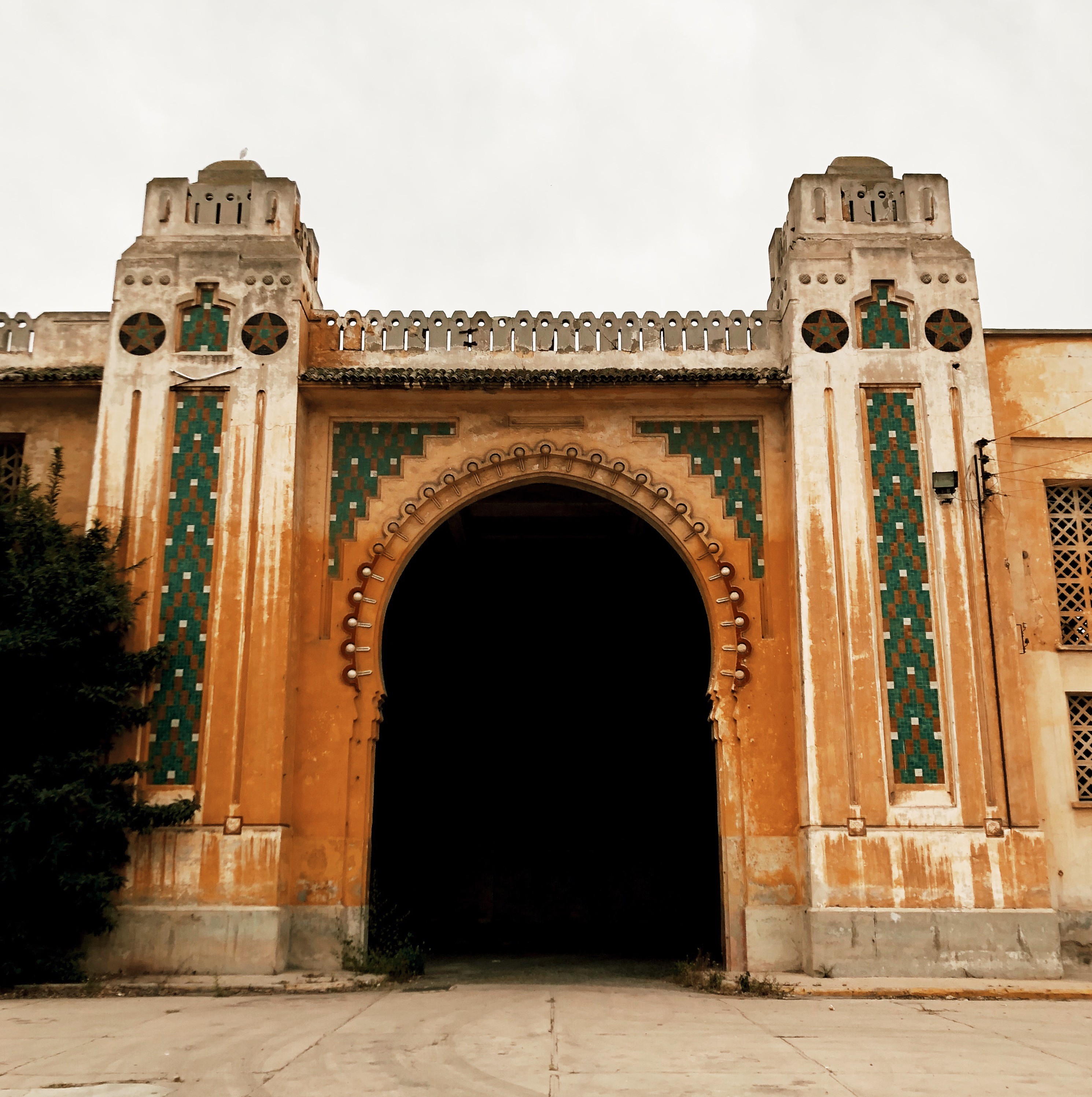
- Interactive map of the Old Abattoirs area

General information
- Location: Casablanca, Morocco
- Coordinates: 33.5948°N 7.5819°W
- Groundbreaking: 1912
- Renovated: 1922

Design and construction
- Architects: George-Ernest Desmarest, renovated by Henri Prost

The Old Abattoirs or the Old Slaughterhouses of Casablanca (Arabic: مسالخ الدار البيضاء القديمة, French: Anciens Abattoirs de Casablanca) were constructed under the French protectorate in Morocco in 1912 in the neighborhood of Hay Mohammadi in Casablanca.

== History ==
The one-time slaughterhouses of Casablanca were constructed by architect George-Ernest Desmarest in 1912 and modernized in 1922 by Henri Prost.

They were expanded in 1951, then closed in 2002, substituted by new slaughterhouses in the periphery of Casablanca.

Abandoned since 2002, the approximately 14 acre complex became host to a public art movement, with free performances, workshops, and concerts. Theatre Nomade is still based there.

== Architecture ==
The Old Abattoirs were built in a style inspired by Neo-Mauresque, or Moorish Revival, as well as Art Deco.
