= L'Morphine =

Moroccan rapper (born 1984)

- Also known as: Lmorpho, Chiekh Rap, M-Psy
- Born: Mehdi Mouhib; November 19, 1984 (age 41); Midelt, Morocco
- Genres: rap; Moroccan hip-hop
- Occupations: Rapper, Songwriter
- Years active: 2004-present
- Formerly of: Piranha-Labo

Mehdi Mouhib (born November 19, 1984), known professionally as L'Morphine, (formally as M-Psy), is a Moroccan rapper and songwriter from Midelt. Mouhib is recognized for his distinctive lyrical approach, characterized by sophisticated literary techniques (extended metaphors, metonymy, alliteration, & symbolism) and profound philosophical themes. Widely considered to be one of the best Moroccan rappers, and to have the biggest rap music catalog in Morocco with over 200 singles.

== Life and education ==
=== Personal life ===
Born in 1984 in Midelt, Morocco, and spent his childhood and adolescence in Midelt and Meknes. Currently married, he is the father of two children.

=== Education ===
Coming from an academic family background, his mother served as a physician while his father practiced as a private medical doctor, he pursued higher education in Canada, graduating with a degree in tourism management. Professionally, he maintains dual occupations in both the tourism sector and the commercial trade of geological specimens, specializing in rocks and fossils.

== Career ==
Mouhib began his artistic journey in the early 2000s under the stage name "M-Psy," drawing inspiration from American hip-hop. Initially treating rap as a hobby, he didn't upload his work online until 2004 when he began engaging with audiences. In 2006, he joined the Salé-based rap collective Piranha-Labo before departing in 2010 to focus on his solo career.

=== Artistic style ===
Renowned for his complex metaphorical lyricism, Mouhib has earned the nickname "King of Metaphors" in Moroccan rap. His writing demands careful analysis, fostering deep audience engagement. Distinctively, he records tracks immediately after writing and rarely when he appears in music videos.

He made his live debut at Le Boulevard festival in Casablanca (2022), one of the biggest festivals in the world. In 2025, he performed at Mawazine and was part of the 40+ rapper line-up performing at EGREGORE Festival, celebrating 40 years of hip-hop in Morocco.

=== Career milestones and fanbase growth ===
From modest beginnings, Mouhib's popularity grew significantly:

- 2015: Formation of dedicated fan group 2020 SQUAD
- 2020: Mainstream breakthrough following media appearances
- 2022: Spotify debut with GALA EP
- Highly anticipated album Excelsior (in development since 2015)

== Influence ==
Mouhib has established himself as one of Morocco's most prominent battle rappers, recognized for his lyrical prowess in high-profile feuds within the hip-hop scene. His reputation in this competitive arena led to his selection as a guest judge for the rap battle episode of Jamshow, Morocco's televised rap competition on 2M, where he evaluated contestants based on flow, wordplay, and improvisational skills.

Mouhib has influenced the careers of many rappers in Morocco, including as Pause Flow, Hamza 15-3, Raid, Diib and others.

== Discography and musical evolution ==
With over 200 recorded tracks, Mouhib's career highlights include:

- Mixtape Maxi Mighnatiss (2006, with Pirahna Labo)
- Mixtape Maxi Na9ouss (2009, solo)
- Mixtape Maxi Morphine (2011, solo)
- Mixtape Total (2012)
- Mixtape Paprika (2013)
- Mixtape INK (2019)
- LMorphiniya series (2015-present, currently at 35 installments)
- EP GALA (2020)
- EP Yakine (2024)
- Mixtape Mo3wa9 Chaytlo 39el (2025)
- EP KAIZEN (2026)

== See also ==
- Moroccan hip-hop
- Arabic Hip Hop
- Diss Track
- EP (Extended Play)
