= Ahmed El Bidaoui =

Moroccan musician (1918–1989)

Ahmed El Bidaoui احمد البيضاوي
- Born: 1918
- Origin: Morocco
- Died: 1989 (aged 70–71)

Ahmed El Bidaoui (Arabic: احمد البيضاوي; 1918 – c. 1989) was a Moroccan musician and singer.

== Biography ==
It is difficult to find precise traces in the chronology of his life; it is known however that since his childhood, he evolved/moved in the musical environment of his family. Afterwards, he attended school to learn from masters the principles of the modalism and Arabic rhythmic styles.

Ahmed El Bidaoui defined the function of the type-setter who according to him organizes, according to a system which is clean for him and which characterizes musical work, as a succession of sounds.

== His view of the music ==
Ahmed El Bidaoui noted:

A type-setter of music is a creative musician of music. It is also said that the written type-setter of the music, whereas this one is not inevitably immediately retranscribed on a partition. Indeed, the word 'type-setter' tends to be employed whatever the kind and the type of music concerned.

It will also say that the concept of type-setter, who "thinks" and the music – for the music "writes" having a system of notation, supposes the existence of an interpreter, who carries out this one. –Ahmed El Bidaoui

Being a complete artist, Ahmed El Bidaoui composed and interpreted almost all of his songs.

== Songs ==
- Al far'ha al koubra (La grande joie)
- Ya Sahiba Essawlati wa Sawlajane
- Nachid Ndaâ El Watan
- Ya Mawtteni
- Ounchoudat lhoub
- Yahabibi afiq
- Habibi ta âla
- An ser dam'i betess' al leih
- Ilayki
- 3odta ya khayra imami
