= Muslim (rapper) =

Moroccan rapper

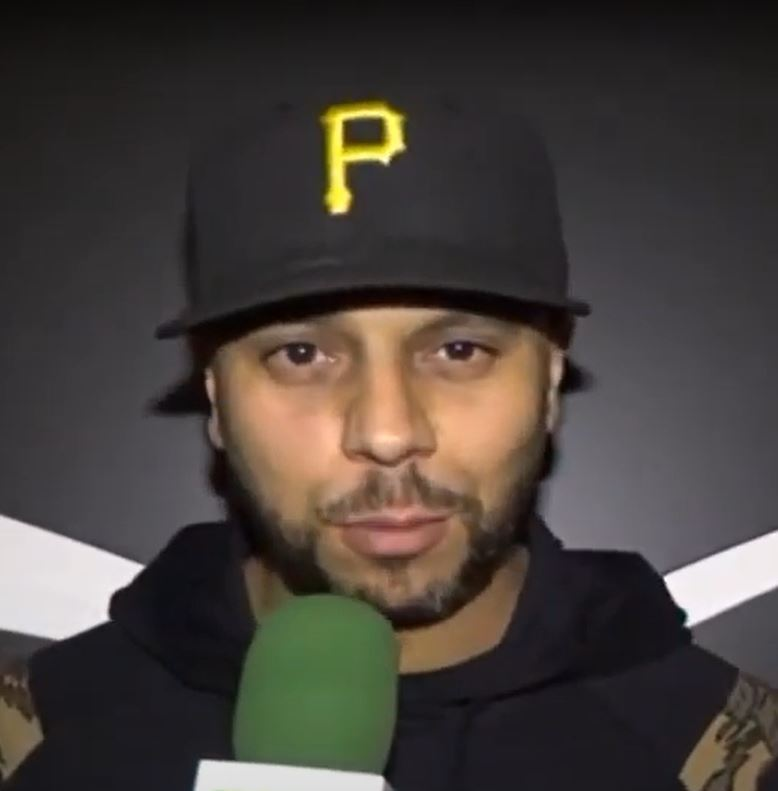

Background information
- Also known as: Muslim, Caballero
- Born: Mohamed Al-Hadi Al-Mazouri; December 10, 1981 (age 44); Tangier, Morocco
- Genres: Rap . Boom bap
- Occupation: Rapper . Businessman
- Years active: 1998-present
- Formerly of: Zanka Flow
- Website: caballero.ma

Mohamed Al-Hadi Al-Mazouri (born December 10, 1981), better known by his stage name Muslim, is a Moroccan rapper and entrepreneur. He is widely recognized as a key figure in Maghreb rap and is considered one of the most popular and prolific Moroccan rappers of his generation. He has also been described as one of the most influential Arab rappers.

== Early life ==
Mohamed Al-Hadi Al-Mazouri was born on December 10, 1981, in a working-class neighborhood in Tangier, Morocco. Muslim discovered rap when he heard a tape by Tupac, and he was immediately inspired to start rapping.

== Career ==
He began rapping with his friends around the ages of 16 or 17. In 1998, he formed the rap group Zanka Flow alongside rapper Larbe. Together, they released their debut album, Tanjawa Daba, in 2001 that would go on to become one of the highlights of Moroccan rap. The group disbanded in 2006. Muslim would later go on to form a collective of former rappers called Kachela Records.

In 2010, Muslim released his first album entitled Rahman, which sought to explore the artistic community, especially in the Maghreb rap genre.

Muslim performed at Mawazine Festival in 2012 and in 2014.

In 2017, Muslim was named best Moroccan rapper by the Ministry of Culture. In 2021, he received a nomination for Best Male Artist in North Africa at the All Africa Music Awards. He was among five Moroccan singers, including Hamza El Fadly, L7OR, Dizzy Dros, and Safwan Rahman, competing for the title.

In 2018, amidst a Moroccan product boycott, Muslim faced criticism for dismissing the boycott of items like mineral water and milk, stating he was "too old for such actions". This drew backlash from followers who found it contradictory to the themes in his songs and perceived it as condescension toward fans and critics.

Described as an "idol of the masses," Muslim's music has also seen significant success outside of Morocco, in Europe and the Arab world. He has held multiple performances throughout Spain, including shows in Madrid, Málaga, Ceuta, and at the Razzmatazz in Barcelona.

Regarding his pseudonym, he has stated that "I'm often asked about the origin of my pseudonym, and I still don't know how to explain it".

== Style ==
Muslim's rap style is defined by its lyricism and old school flow, falling under the category of socially conscious or social rap. He draws most of his inspiration from the American rap of the 90s, such as the music of Tupac Shakur. His verses convey positive messages while addressing and condemning prevalent issues in Moroccan society, such as emigration and delinquency forced by misery, the challenges faced by struggling single mothers, government mismanagement, the need for improved education and healthcare systems, corruption, lack of opportunity, and youth unemployment. Muslim advocates against drug use and radicalization. He refrains from using profanity in his music.

Through his music, Muslim aims to break through collective indifference and inspire listeners to transform their troubled society. His music videos portray urban spaces as menacing and highlight the need for personal responsibility and intervention to reclaim them. This pedagogical approach connects neoliberal ideologies with state agendas for urban "renewal." In an interview with the All Africa, he defines the message of his album Al Rissala (The Message) as a call "to revolt against anything negative in our lives or anything that can have negative psychological effects."

== Personal life ==
Muslim is married to Moroccan actress Amal Essaqr and has two children from his first wife.

== Discography ==
=== Albums ===
- Tanjawa Daba (2001)
- Jebha (2003)
- Strictly For My Souljaz (2005)
- Dem w Dmou3 Feat. Zanka Flow (2006)
- Katra (2006)
- Bghini Wela Kerahni (2006)
- Mor Ssour (2008)
- Al Tamarrod, Vol 1: Moutamarrid (2010)
- Al Tamarrod, Vol 2: Al Rissala (2014)

=== Singles ===
- "L'Marhoum" (2013)
- "Berrani" (2025)

== See also ==
- Moroccan hip-hop
- Moroccan music
