= ElGrandeToto =

Moroccan rapper (born 1996)

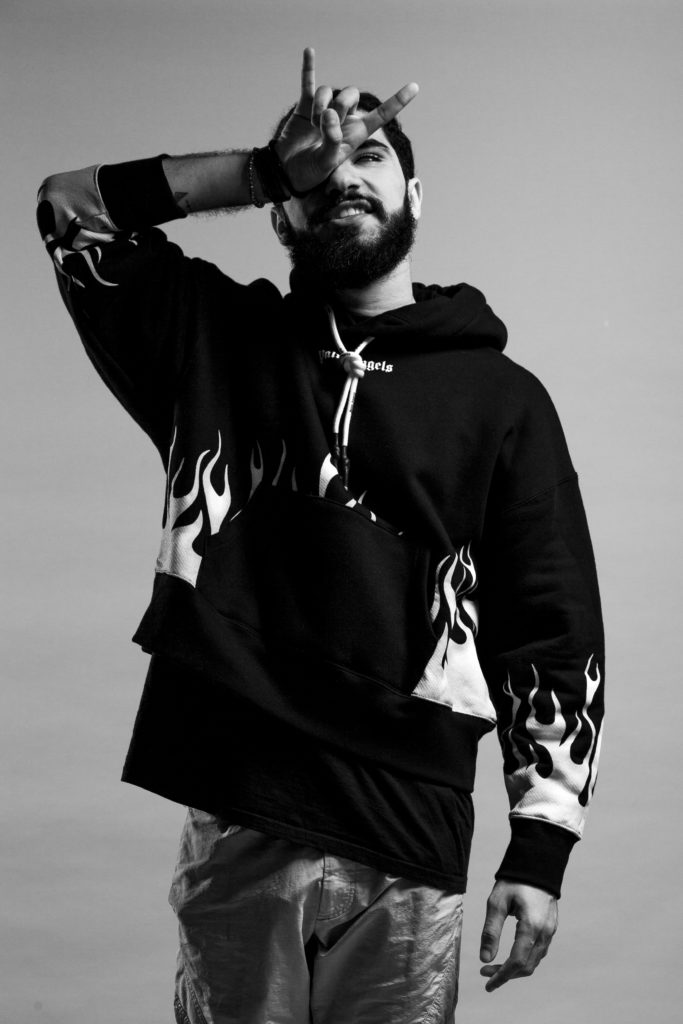
- ElGrandeToto
- Born: Taha Fahssi طه فحصي; 3 August 1996 (age 30); Casablanca, Morocco
- Other names: EGT, Toto, ElGrandeToto
- Occupation: Rapper
- Years active: 2016-present
- Musical career
- Instrument: Vocals
- Labels: BNJ City Block; RCA / Sony
- Website: https://www.egtworld.com/

Taha Fahssi (Arabic: طه فحصي, born August 3, 1996), better known by his stage name ElGrandeToto, EGT or just Toto, is a Moroccan rapper from Casablanca. He has been the most streamed artist in Morocco for five consecutive years (2021-2025) and was the most listened-to artist in the MENA region on Spotify in 2021 and 2023. He is also the most viewed Moroccan rapper on YouTube. Fahssi is widely regarded as one of Morocco's best rappers of all time.

Fahssi began his rapping career in 2016, rising to prominence with his 2017 single Pablo. His debut EP, Illicit followed in 2018. His debut studio album, Caméléon (2021) ranked among the top six global album debuts on Spotify at the time of its release and he was named the most-streamed Arab artist globally. His collaboration with Nigerian artist CKay on the remix of "Love Nwantiti" earned a diamond certification from the SNEP in France, making him the first Moroccan artist performing in Darija to receive that distinction. His second studio album, 27 (2023) debuted at number three on Spotify's Top Album Debut Global Chart. A third studio album, SALGOAT followed in 2024.

His accolades include three Billboard Arabia Music Awards (including Artist of the Year), Best Hip Hop/Rap Artist at the African Entertainment Awards USA, and All Africa Music Awards' (AFRIMA) Most Promising African Artist. He is also known by his collaborations with prominent artists from around the world, including CKay, Morad, Baby Gang and Niro. In 2021, he has been included on Forbes' list of the 50 most successful music stars in the Arab world, and Rolling Stone included his single "Mghayer" in their list of the 50 Best Arabic Pop Songs of the 21st Century. In 2025, DimaTOP Magazine named him the best rapper of the year and described him as "Morocco's first homegrown rap superstar".

== Career ==
=== 2016–2021: Early career and breakthrough ===
Since he was a child, Fahssi was passionate about rap music and also practiced the krump dance. He began his rapping career in 2016. His 2017 single "Pablo" is credited as the breakthrough hit that propelled him to the forefront of the Moroccan music scene. He released his debut EP, Illicit, in 2018.

The year 2020 was a period of significant achievements and personal loss. He was named the eighth most-streamed Arab artist in the MENA region on Deezer, with his song "Hors Série" ranking as the platform's seventh most-streamed track. He also won the award for Best Hip-Hop/Rap Artist at the 2020 African Entertainment Awards USA. In tribute to his mother, who died in 2020, he released the single "Mghayer" in January 2021; it became his most-viewed music video on YouTube, surpassing 137 million views by September 2025.

His debut album, Caméléon, released in March 2021, marked a major milestone. It ranked among the top six global album debuts on Spotify, an unprecedented achievement for an Arab artist at the time. That year, he was included on Forbes' list of the 50 most successful music stars in the Arab world and was awarded the title of most-streamed Arab artist globally and in the MENA region by Spotify.

=== 2022–present: International success ===
In 2022, Fahssi gained significant international recognition. His collaboration with Nigerian singer CKay on the remix of "Love Nwantiti" (2021) was certified diamond in France by the SNEP, making him the first Moroccan artist performing in Darija to receive this certification. The single was also a commercial success cahrting in several European countries. He is signed to an exclusive license agreement with RCA Records, a division of Sony Music France.

His second studio album, 27, was released on November 24, 2023. Its launch was promoted on digital billboards in Times Square and the Toronto Eaton Centre. The album debuted at number 3 on Spotify's Top Album Debut Global Chart and garnered over 10 million streams within its first three days. He supported the album with the "Twenty-Seven Tour," performing across Europe and North America.

In 2024, Fahssi served as a judge alongside Dizzy DROS on the Moroccan rap competition television show JamShow. At the inaugural Billboard Arabia Awards, he won three awards: Artist of the Year – Arabic Hip-Hop, Top Arabic Hip-Hop Male Artist, and Top Arabic Hip-Hop Song for his single "Blue Love."

On June 28, 2025, Fahssi performed as the opening act for Lil Baby at the Mawazine Festival in Rabat, becoming the first Morocco-born-and-raised artist to headline the festival's OLM Souissi stage before a reported crowd of 400,000 people.

== Artistry ==
=== Musical style ===
Fahssi is known for his hip-hop and rap music, performed in a mixture of Moroccan Darija, French, Spanish and English. His music often incorporates Afrobeat influences, marseille, trap and to less extent morap.

=== Influences and persona ===
Among his biggest influences is the American rapper 2Pac, about whom he has said: "I love Pac. Pac stood for something, he defended his ideas." A known supporter of the Moroccan football club Wydad AC, Fahssi referenced his fandom in his early hit "Pablo."

=== Name ===
Fahssi derived his stage name "ElGrandeToto" from the notorious Italian mafia figure Salvatore "Toto" Riina.

== Political views and activism ==
Fahssi has publicly engaged in internet activism on both international and domestic issues. In 2024, he participated in a charity concert in Paris on May 22 in support of Palestine during the Gaza genocide, performing alongside other North African artists, with “all proceeds … to Medical Aid for Palestinians”.

In the context of growing discontent in Morocco in 2025, Fahssi voiced support for the Gen Z protests demanding reforms in healthcare, education and governance. He wrote on Instagram "in the most beautiful country in the world, this youth is being targeted and is screaming out, but only for their rights. ... This Moroccan youth isn't backing down; they want a better tomorrow."

== Reception ==
Fahssi is frequently described as a dominant commercial force in the MENA region. Rolling Stone included his single "Mghayer" in their list of 50 Best Arabic Pop Songs of 21st Century. Billboard magazine has characterized him as "a force to be reckoned with," noting his consistent chart performance and streaming numbers. Upon its release, his album Caméléon landed among the top six global album debuts on Spotify, a first for an Arab artist at the time. Fahssi was the most-streamed Moroccan artist on Spotify for consecutive years from 2021 through 2024.

Le Monde called ElGrandeToto “one of the most listened-to artists in the Arab world” at age 27, adding that “he gives voice to a youth on the margins, ravaged by unemployment … whose everyday life is described in his lyrics”. SceneNoise referred to him as “the chameleon of Moroccan rap,” a nickname relating to his fluid style that shifts across languages, moods, and subgenres. Forbes lauded his stage presence at Mawazine in 2025, writing that he “wows 320K fans” and calling him “Morocco’s answer to Travis Scott.”

In DimaTOP Magazine’s "Top 10 Moroccan Rap Albums of All Time", Fahssi’s Caméléon (2021) is ranked #6, praised for his “versatility and artistic range.” His later album, 27 (2023), holds the #4 position on the same list and is described as “a deeply personal and resilient work” where he addresses his personal life and family. The publication has also ranked him as the third best Moroccan rappers of all time in industry-wide polls, describing his as "a dominant force in streaming, and a leading global ambassador for the genre." The same publication also named him the best rapper of 2025, citing his record-breaking views on 2M TV and his draw at the Mawazine festival, calling him "Morocco's first homegrown rap superstar."

His artistry and influence have been recognized through several major awards. At the inaugural Billboard Arabia Music Awards in 2024, Fahssi won three awards, including Artist of the Year – Arabic Hip-Hop and Top Arabic Hip-Hop Song for "Blue Love". He has also received international recognition, winning Best Hip-Hop/Rap Artist at the African Entertainment Awards USA and being named Most Promising African Artist at the All Africa Music Awards (AFRIMA).

Fahssi ranked as the MENA region's second most-streamed artist of 2025, placing behind Egyptian singer Amr Diab. According to a January 2026 report in The Times, Morocco's Crown Prince Moulay Hassan is a fan of ElGrandeToto.

== Personal life ==
Fahssi was born and raised in the Benjdiya neighborhood, Casablanca. Affected by his mother's death from cancer and a fire that destroyed his family home, he dedicated his album 27 to these events, symbolized by its cover art of a burning door. His hit song "Mghayer" is a tribute to his mother. Fahssi is married and has a son.

== Legal history ==
=== 2022 cannabis comments ===
In September 2022, Fahssi sparked a significant controversy during a festival press conference by defending his recreational use of cannabis, stating, "I smoke hash, so what? ... It doesn’t mean I set a bad example." The following month, he issued a public apology for his remarks.

Subsequently, complaints were filed against the rapper by three artists, a journalist, and a police officer. He was taken into custody as authorities launched an investigation into his public statements and digital content for elements "likely to be punishable by law." His lawyer argued that his client should not be used as a tool to "settle political scores."

Most complaints were later withdrawn. The public prosecution office in Casablanca released him on a bail of 20,000 MAD ($2200). On January 18, 2023, a Casablanca court sentenced him to an eight-month suspended prison sentence and a fine of 10,000 MAD ($1100).

=== 2023 Madrid concert incident ===
A concert in Madrid on July 20, 2023, turned controversial following an interaction with a fan. In a traditional Moroccan gesture of appreciation, often directed at shickats (traditional performers), a fan tucked 20 euro notes into Toto's clothing. The rapper interpreted the act as humiliating and responded with a profanity-laden tirade directed at the audience.

=== 2024 Bordeaux concert incident ===
In February 2024, Fahssi sparked significant online backlash following another interaction with a fan at a concert in Bordeaux. While performing his track Haram (Pablo II), the rapper was struck in the face by a concertgoer who threw a Wydad AC jersey on the stage. Visibly enraged, Fahssi threw the jersey back, paused the show, and lashed out with verbal insults towards the fan. A video of the incident circulated on social media, where football fans criticized his reaction and accused him of disrespecting the Casablanca-based club.

Fahssi delivered a response a few days later on X, stating that the fan had been disrespectful towards him since the beginning of the concert. Regarding the jersey, Fahssi wrote "If you want me to raise a jersey - welcome, but don't throw it at my face." The rapper concluded the post by apologizing to his fans.

=== 2024 political remarks ===
In September 2024, former prime minister Abdelilah Benkirane sparked backlash after criticizing Fahssi at a political congress, referring to him as a "scum" in Moroccan Darija, (salgot). The criticism came after the rapper's music was played at a youth congress held by the opposing, ruling Rally of Independents (RNI) party.

In response, Fahssi declared he had no affiliation with any political party. He also altered his Instagram bio to include the word "SALGOAT," a portmanteau combining the Moroccan Arabic word for "scum" (salgot) and the acronym "GOAT" (Greatest of All Time).

=== 2025 Kenitra Festival controversy ===
On August 25, 2025, Fahssi faced a major public and legal controversy following his performance at the inaugural Kenitra Festival. Critics and local residents labeled his set as “immoral” and “catastrophic” due to his vulgar speech and explicit lyrics which echoed past the festival grounds and into nearby residential neighborhoods. The Association Printemps du Cinéma filed a formal legal complaint against the rapper with the Minister of Justice. The lawsuit accused him of public indecency and violating the behavioral standards expected at state-sponsored events under Article 483 of the Penal Code.

In response, Fahssi posted videos criticizing the association with insults. Rather than remaining in the kingdom to face legal proceedings, Fahssi announced that he was relocating his professional activities to France.

== Discography ==
=== Albums ===
- Illicit EP (2018)
- Caméléon (2021)
- 27 (2023)
- SALGOAT (2024)
- SALGOAT (Vol.2) (2026)

== Awards and nominations ==
Fahssi has received significant recognition for his work, including awards from the Billboard Arabia Music Awards and multiple nominations at the All Africa Music Awards (AFRIMA). His accolades reflect his dominance in the Arab hip-hop scene and his growing influence across the African continent.

List of awards and nominations
Award	Year	Recipient(s) and nominee(s)	Category	Result	Ref.
Billboard Arabia Music Awards	2024	Himself	Top Arabic Hip-Hop Male Artist	Won	
Billboard Arabia Music Awards	2024	Himself	Artist of the Year – Arabic Hip-Hop	Won	
Billboard Arabia Music Awards	2024	"Blue Love"	Top Arabic Hip-Hop Song	Won	
All Africa Music Awards (AFRIMA)	2021	Himself	Most Promising African Artist	Won	
All Africa Music Awards (AFRIMA)	2025	Himself	Artiste of the Year	Nominated	
All Africa Music Awards (AFRIMA)	2025	Himself	Best Male Artist in Northern Africa	Nominated	
All Africa Music Awards (AFRIMA)	2025	"Diplomatico"	Song of the Year	Nominated	
All Africa Music Awards (AFRIMA)	2025	SALGOAT	Album of the Year	Nominated	
All Africa Music Awards (AFRIMA)	2025	"Kafini" (with Tif)	Best African Act in Diaspora (Male)	Nominated	

== See also ==
- Moroccan hip-hop
- Arabic hip-hop
