= H-Kayne =

Moroccan rap group

- Origin: Meknes
- Genres: Moroccan hip hop, Hip hop music and Rap music
- Years active: 1996–present
- Label: Platinum Music
- Members: Hatim Bensalha (HB2), Adil Benchakroune (Sif Lssane), Azzedine Ter-Hoor, Otmane, DJ Khalid

H-Kayne (meaning "What's happening?" in Moroccan Arabic) is a pioneering Moroccan rap group formed in 1996 in Meknes. The original lineup consists of Adel Benchekroun (Sif Lssan), Hatim Bensalha (HB2), Ezzedine Bouhout (Ter 7or), Othman Benhami, and DJ Khalid.

The group's breakthrough came in 2003 when they won first prize at Casablanca's prestigious music festival, L'Boulevard des Jeunes Musiciens. This victory led to their signing with Universal Music's Platinum label, marking them as one of the first Moroccan rap acts to secure an international recording contract. Their success at this competition demonstrated rap music's growing acceptance in Moroccan culture and paved the way for future artists.

H-Kayne achieved widespread fame through their signature hit "Issawa Style" (2004), as well as others like "F'mo Hadak," "Hdaw Hdaw," and "Jil Jadid." These tracks showcased their ability to merge traditional Moroccan musical elements with contemporary hip-hop, earning them recognition as pioneers of Maghrebi rap, also known as Morap. Their cultural significance was formally acknowledged when King Mohammed VI honored the group with the Order of Ouissam Alaouite, one of Morocco's highest civilian distinctions, cementing their status as national cultural ambassadors.

== Career ==
=== Origins and Beginnings ===
The group, a pioneer of rap in Morocco, was originally formed under the name Dogs. It was initially composed of four members: Adil, Azeddine, Othman, and Hatim. The idea for the group emerged around 1996 in Meknes. At that time, all the future members were passionate about hip-hop, exploring all elements of the culture: freestyling, beatboxing, and breakdancing.

In February 2001 in Montpellier, DJ Khalid met Hatim, a member of the group who was pursuing studies in France. After listening to Dogs' first album, Hdaw Dogs Jaw, DJ Khalid was interested in a project with the group. A year later, in 2002, the collective gathered, along with Dj Khalid, in Morocco to create the first H-Kayne productions, but the recording session planned for Montpellier was compromised due to a visa refusal. The group then began recording the demo for the album in a makeshift studio set up in a 9 m² room, using blankets for soundproofing. After three weeks, the demo was ready.

=== 1 Son 2 Bled'Art and HK 1426 ===
On May 30, 2003, H-Kayne made its first stage appearance at the Boulevard des Jeunes Musiciens event (known locally as L'Boulevard) in Casablanca and won first prize in the rap and hip-hop categories. Their performance did not go unnoticed, and offers began pouring in. On June 24, the group continued its momentum by giving a one-and-a-half-hour concert at the French Institute in Meknès for a large audience. This performance led to H-Kayne being offered a tour of several French Institutes across the kingdom in 2004. In January 2004, H-Kayne self-produced and released its first album, titled 1 Son 2 Bled'Art, which was a major success throughout Morocco.

H-Kayne signed with the label Platinium Music, a record company and subsidiary of Universal Records, and released its second album, HK 1426, in 2005. Jeune Afrique ranked the album eighth on its list of ten albums that marked the history of African rap. The album includes the hit single Issawa Style. This single gained traction and became popular in 78 countries. HK 1426 and 1 Son 2 Bled'Art would become worldwide hits in 2006 and 2008, respectively. In 2006, H-Kayne performed at the Bataclan in Paris, making them the first and only Moroccan rappers to have done so.

=== H-Kaynology and the upcoming album ===
Prior to the release of their third album, the group performed a series of concerts in Morocco and abroad, notably in Spain, France, Belgium, the Netherlands, Germany, Egypt, Tunisia, and Algeria. On August 10, 2009, H-Kaynology was released, containing twelve tracks and produced by, among others, Sayd (producer for Rohff, Booba, Diam's, etc.) and Hammadi Boujmal, who has also produced tracks for MTV and Ludacris. In 2011, H-Kayne was appointed as a Goodwill Ambassador in Morocco for the United Nations Development Programme. In 2013, the group was decorated by Morocco's King, Mohammed VI, with the Order of Ouissam Alaouite, one of Morocco's highest civilian distinctions.

In early 2016, H-Kayne collaborated with French singer Kenza Farah on a song titled On est posé, which was accompanied by a music video filmed in Marrakech. Around 2016-2017, the group announced the release of a new album. In January 2017, they released the single Gana, taken from their upcoming album, along with a music video. In August 2017, the group released another single, Ana hor, arranged by DJ Abdel and also accompanied by a music video, filmed in the Agafay Desert near Marrakech, which is a fusion of several musical styles.

=== Festivals ===
H-Kayne achieved great success in Europe, particularly France and Spain. They have also participated in numerous festivals in Morocco, such as those organized by Maroc Telecom, Meditel, Wana, and the Mawazine Festival.

== Discography ==
=== Albums ===
- 1 Son 2 Bled'Art (2004)
- HK 1426 (2005)
- H-Kaynology (2009)
