= Don Bigg =

Moroccan rapper (born 1983)

Taoufik Hazeb
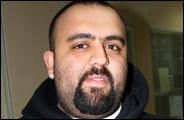
- Hazeb in 2006
- Born: Taoufiq Hazeb; October 8, 1983 (age 42); Casablanca, Morocco
- Other names: Don Bigg, Bigg da Don, Bigg
- Occupations: Rapper, producer
- Years active: 1999-present
- Musical career
- Instrument: Vocals

Taoufiq Hazeb (born 8 October 1983) better known by his stage name Don Bigg, Bigg da Don or simply Bigg, is a Moroccan rapper and producer from Casablanca.

Bigg is widely regarded as one of Morocco’s most influential rappers, renowned for his sharp lyricism, impeccable flow, and socially conscious themes. His music resonates deeply with urban Moroccan youth, addressing pressing issues such as corruption, social inequality, and everyday struggles with unflinching honesty.

== Biography ==
Fluent in English, Don Bigg began singing in English before Masta Flow, a rapper very close to him, advised him to sing in Darija to be understood by all Moroccans . In 2006 his first album Mgharba Tal mout was released .

At the end of 2015, he collaborated with nine other artists — DJ VAN, Asmaa Lamnawar, Ahmed Soultan, Ahmed Chawki, Douzi, Nabyla Maan, Khansa Batma, Hamid El Kasri and Rachida Talal, Dizzy DROS — in Kafana Soukout, a piece for road safety subsidized by Renault Maroc .

At the end of 2018, a clash pitted him against "new generation" rappers, notably when he released his title 170 kg and others.

In 2025, Bigg, alongside fellow rap star Shobee, took on the role of head judge for JamShow, a nationally televised rap competition aimed at showcasing Morocco's rising hip-hop talent.

== Discography ==
=== Albums ===
2006 : Mgharba Tal Moute

No ^{_}	Title	Duration
1.	Intro	00:11
2.	Mgharba 'Tal Moute	04:34
3.	3a9el	02:59
4.	Family (feat. Fnaïre)	04:17
5.	Banda Hamra (feat. Loubna)	03:45
6.	6 Min 3likum	06:00
7.	Khellina Ghir Hna (feat. Masta Flow & 9mm )	03:32
8.	Skit	02:08
9.	Tgallia Hbass	03:45
10.	3a9lia (feat. DJ Key)	04:28
11.	Bladi Bl (feat. Colonel)	04:54
12.	Ga3 Nass (feat. Loubna)	03:04
13.	Lga3 Lli Bhalek (feat. 9mm & Y-Cine)	03:27
14.	Interlude	01:10
15.	Hello	03:12
16.	Ma Bine Llil Ou Nhar (feat. Caprice & Lotfi)	03:29
17.	Marra Marra	02:45
18.	1983...2006	04:06
19.	Mimti (feat. Tizaf & Loubna)	03:13
20.	Al Khouf	03:48
21.	Hello	01:18
22.	Wahed Jo (feat. Muslim)	02:32
23.	Skizo Fri3 (feat. Skizo)	03:
24.	Outro	03:49
01:20:17

2009 : Byad Ou K7al

No ^{_}	Title	Duration
1.	Byad Ou K7al	03:57
2.	Casanegra	05:28
3.	La3bine (feat. La Fouine)	04:10
4.	Ifri9ia	03:06
5.	Hip Hop Interlude 1 (feat. Masta Flow)	02:35
6.	Chno Ndir	03:06
7.	Would Zen9a	03:26
8.	Lik (feat. Oum)	04:00
9.	Bjouj	04:11
10.	Kinbghik (feat. Loubna Souiri)	04:03
11.	16/05	04:40
12.	Karianist (feat. Momo Cat)	04:30
13.	Bouliss	03:06
14.	Hip Hop Interlude 2 (feat. Masta Flow)	04:56
15.	2 Sba3 Lsma	05:19
16.	Itoub	04:34
17.	Bjouj (Leo Veil Remix)	02:58
18.	L7asoul	03:26
01:11:38

2015 : Talet

No ^{_}	Title	Duration
1.	Lbedia	01:28
2.	Ma Ghatwsalch	03:52
3.	MVP's (feat. Nessyou & Masta Flow)	04:00
4.	Hna Maliha	03:29
5.	T-JR (feat. Ahmed Soultan)	04/00
6.	Talkinha Tesrah	04:08
7.	Lqaleb	03:29
8.	Melli Kount Sghir (feat. Marwan)	04:49
9.	Gaama Ala Balna	03:12
10.	Ghadi Bellour	03:35
11.	Galouli	03:51
12.	2006...2014 (feat. Nadeer)	04:48
13.	Lmerd Lkbih	03:30
14.	Ghatchathi	05:29
15.	Maliach (feat. Aub & Adil Babel)	07:04
16.	Lmizane (feat. Small X & P.Mouchkil)	05:26
17.	Ana	03:55
18.	Lmsalia	01:28
01:11:38

2022 : ٤in

No ^{_}	Title	Duration
1.	Dekhla	01:28
2.	Lawal (3reft Trap)	03:52
3.	Freedom	04:00
4.	٤in	03:29
5.	Sanae (Skit)	04/00
6.	Run	04:08
7.	Tebbi	03:29
8.	VFX (feat. Vortex & Flipperachi)	04:49
9.	Ghi T9al (Et2al) (feat. Marwan Moussa)	03:12
10.	The Stranger (feat. Reda Taliani)	03:35
11.	M9awda	03:51
12.	L7essada (feat. Said Senhaji & Abdelaziz Stati)	04:48
13.	Weld L3abd (feat. Teni & Hamid Elkassri)	03:30
14.	Arahmini	05:29
15.	Houa Wyaha	07:04
16.	Wlad L'Hazeb (feat. Pappy Mouchkil, TJR, Kookie Célia, Betty & Souky)	05:26
17.	Sparta	03:55
18.	Allaho Akbar (feat. The Game & Obie Trice)	01:28
19.	Jale (feat. Noveen Morris)	01:28
20.	Tmechay (feat. Skales)	03:32
01:11:38

=== Mixtapes ===
2009 : Byad Ou K7al Mixtape

No ^{_}	Title	Duration
1.	Mat3anedch (Pappy Mouchkil feat. Don Bigg)	02:29
2.	Lik (feat. Oum)	04:04
3.	Hamdine Lah	02:46
4.	Itoub Itoub	02:29
5.	Freestyle	03:18
6.	Jamhouri 7kam	03:22
7.	Album Byad Ou K7al	01:10
8.	Excerpt Album 2009	00:50
9.	Freestyle in London	01:16
21:44

=== Music Videos ===
Year	Title	Director
2011	Mabghitch	Khalid Douache
2015	LQALEB	Final Company
2015	T-JR	Sebastien Rossi
2019	Psycho Wrecking	Sebastien Rossi
2020	LMERYOULA	Mohammed Ali Laaaouini
2023	Arahmini	Actarus Aksas

=== Appearances ===
- 2006

Ahmed Soultan feat. Don Bigg & Azed – Bladi
Don Bigg feat. Muslim & L3arbi – (Zanka flow) – Ghir bnadem khaser

== See also ==
- Moroccan Hip Hop
- Dizzy DROS
- Shayfeen
- Tagne
