= Charity record =

Release of a song for a specific charitable cause

A charity record, charity album, charity song, or charity single is a recording with most or all proceeds raised going to a dedicated foundation or charity. In 1956, The Lord's Taverners released a 78 rpm disc which contained six tracks donated by popular artists at the time. The record was released by The Decca Record Company and the entire profits of the record together with the royalties and fees from artists, publishers, etc., were donated to The National Playing Fields Association. This was the first charity record to make the UK charts and reached Number 2. Due to its success, it was followed by a second compilation in 1957.

George Harrison's "Bangla Desh" single in 1971 is commonly regarded as the first successful international charity single; it was recorded to help fund relief efforts following the 1970 Bhola cyclone and the Bangladesh Liberation War. The money raised was donated to UNICEF, as were takings from Harrison's Concert for Bangladesh (again, the first of its kind) held at Madison Square Garden, New York, and its spin-off live album and concert film. This is one way of using artistic talent as art for charity.

Some of the other early charity records came from the January 1979 Music for UNICEF Concert, with the likes of ABBA's "Chiquitita" and the Bee Gees' "Too Much Heaven" released as singles, all the royalties from which went to UNICEF. Band Aid's "Do They Know It's Christmas?" in November 1984 began the revolution of the charity record, which would be popularised throughout the 1980s.

In the United States, charity records reached their peak with USA for Africa's "We Are the World" in 1985, but then essentially died out afterwards. In the United Kingdom, however, charity singles (especially Comic Relief), have become annual hits.

== Notable charity singles ==
=== 1970s ===
Release date	Title	Artists	Charity/Cause	Highest Chart Position
July 1971	"Bangla Desh"	George Harrison	UNICEF fund for Bangladesh refugees	10 (UK), 23 (US), 2 (Switzerland), 3 (Norway), 7 (Netherlands)
February 1975	"Santa Never Made It into Darwin"	Bill and Boyd	Rebuilding Darwin after Cyclone Tracy devastation	2 (Australia)
January 1979	"Too Much Heaven"	Bee Gees	UNICEF	1 (US)
January 1979	"Da Ya Think I'm Sexy?"	Rod Stewart	UNICEF	1 (US)

=== 1980s ===
Release date	Title	Artist(s)	Charity/cause	Highest chart position
March 1983	"I Was Only 19"	Redgum	Vietnam Veterans Assoc of Australia	1 (Australia)
June 1984	"Pink Frost"	The Chills	Cancer Research	17 (New Zealand)
November 1984	"Do They Know It's Christmas?"	Band Aid	famine in Ethiopia through the Band Aid Trust	1 (UK, Australia, Netherlands)
December 1984	"Last Christmas"/"Everything She Wants"	Wham!	Ethiopian Famine appeal (not originally a charity record, but George Michael acceded to give royalties to the Band Aid Trust)	2 (UK, Netherlands)
March 1985	"Tears Are Not Enough"	Northern Lights	famine in Ethiopia	1 (Canada)
March 1985	"Starvation/Tam Tam Pour L'Ethiopie"	Starvation/Tam Tam Pour L'Ethiopie	famine in Ethiopia	33 (UK)
March 1985	"Show some Concern"	The Concerned	famine in Ethiopia	1 (Ireland)
March 1985	"We Are the World"	USA for Africa	famine in Ethiopia and Sudan	1 (US, UK, Australia, Netherlands)
May 1985	"Stars"	Hear 'n Aid	famine in Ethiopia	26 (UK) 1 (Norway)
May 1985	"Éthiopie"	Chanteurs sans Frontières	famine in Ethiopia	1 (France)
May 1985	"Les Yeux de la faim"	Fondation Quebec-Afrique	famine in Africa	1 (Quebec)
June 1985	"One Big Family"	Heart of Nashville	famine in Ethiopia and Africa	61 (US Country)
June 1985	"You'll Never Walk Alone"	The Crowd	Bradford City stadium fire	1 (UK, Ireland), 30 (Netherlands)
June 1985	"Ben"	Marti Webb	Ben Hardwick Memorial Fund	5 (UK)
August 1985	"Dancing in the Street"	David Bowie and Mick Jagger	Famine in Ethiopia through the Band Aid Trust	1 (UK, Australia, Ireland), 7 (US)
August 1985	"The Garden"	Australia Too	Freedom from Hunger	38 (Australia)
October 1985	"Sun City"	Artists United Against Apartheid	protests/boycotts against apartheid	38 (US), 21 (UK), 4 (AUS)
November 1985	"Do You Believe in Miracles"	Slade	Band Aid Trust and NSPCC	54 (UK)
November 1985	"Almost Seems (Too Late to Turn)"	Clannad	Children in Need	80 (UK)
November 1985	"That's What Friends Are For"	Dionne Warwick, Stevie Wonder, Gladys Knight and Elton John	American Foundation for AIDS Research (AmFAR)	1 (US, Australia), 16 (UK), 13 (Netherlands)
April 1986	"Living Doll"	Cliff Richard and the cast of The Young Ones	Comic Relief	1 (UK, Australia, Netherlands)
May 1986	"Make It Work"	Christy Moore, Paul Doran and The Self Aid Band	Unemployment	1 (IRE)
May 1986	"Everybody Wants to Run the World"	Tears For Fears	Sport Aid	5 (UK)
May 1986	"Hands Across America"	Voices of America	Hands Across America	65 (US)
November 1986	"O' My Father Had A Rabbit"	Ray Moore	Children In Need	24 (UK)
November 1986	"Give Give Give"	Dance Aid	multiple sclerosis research	85 (UK)
March 1987	"Amor & Paz" (Amor E A Paz)	AUA (Artistas Unidos da América)	famine and poverty around the world	3 (US), 2 (Portugal)
March 1987	"Let It Be"	Ferry Aid	Herald of Free Enterprise disaster at Zeebrugge	1 (UK), 4 (Netherlands)
March 1987	"Sailing"	Rod Stewart	Herald of Free Enterprise disaster at Zeebrugge	41 (UK), 30 (Ireland)
November 1987	"Bog Eyed Jog"	Ray Moore	Children In Need	61 (UK)
November 1987	"The Wishing Well"	G.O.S.H.	Great Ormond Street Hospital Wishing Well Appeal	22 (UK)
December 1987	"Rockin' Around the Christmas Tree"	Mel & Kim (Mel Smith and Kim Wilde)	Comic Relief	3 (UK)
February 1988	"Man in the Mirror"	Michael Jackson	Michael Jackson Burn Center, Childhelp, United Negro College Fund.	1 (USA, UK R&B), 13 (Netherlands), 2 (UK [2009])
April 1988	"Let's All Chant"	Pat and Mick	Capital Radio 1988 Help a London Child Appeal	11 (UK)
May 1988	"With a Little Help from My Friends"	Wet Wet Wet	ChildLine	1 (UK)
May 1988	"You're Not Alone"	Australian Olympians	Australian Olympic Federation for the 1988 Summer Olympics	18 (Australia)
July 1988	"Another Part of Me"	Michael Jackson	Michael Jackson Burn Center, Childhelp	1 (US R&B), 8 (Netherlands)
August 1988	"Running All Over the World"	Status Quo	Sport Aid	17 (UK)
November 1988	"Children in Need"	Spirit of Play with Paul McCartney	Children In Need	72 (UK)
January 1989	"Self Destruction"	The Stop the Violence Movement	National Urban League	33 (New Zealand), 75 (UK)
February 1989	"Help!"	Bananarama & La na nee nee noo noo (French and Saunders with Kathy Burke)	Comic Relief	3 (UK), 24 (Netherlands)
February 1989	"Pour toi Arménie"	Charles Aznavour & many other French artists	Earthquake in Armenia	1 (France), 3 (Belgium)
March 1989	"I Haven't Stopped Dancing Yet" version	Pat and Mick	Capital Radio 1989 Help a London Child Appeal	9 (UK)
April 1989	"Ferry Cross the Mersey"	The Christians, Holly Johnson, Paul McCartney, Gerry Marsden, Stock Aitken Waterman	Hillsborough disaster	1 (UK), 21 (Netherlands)
November 1989	"If You Want To Help"	BBC Children in Need Choir	Children In Need	78 (UK)
November 1989	"It Takes Two"	Bruno Brookes and Liz Kershaw featuring Jive Bunny and Londonbeat	Children In Need	53 (UK)
December 1989	"Smoke on the Water"	Rock Aid Armenia	victims of the 1988 Armenian earthquake	39 (UK)
December 1989	"Do They Know It's Christmas?"	Band Aid II	famine in Ethiopia	1 (UK), 20 (Netherlands)

=== 1990s ===
Release date	Title	Artist(s)	Charity/cause	Highest chart position
January 1990	"Starmaker"	The All Stars	fundraising campaign for children in the developing world	57 (Netherlands)
April 1990	"Use It Up and Wear It Out"	Pat and Mick	Capital Radio 1990 Help a London Child	22 (UK)
May 1990	"We're All in the Same Gang"	The West Coast Rap All-Stars	anti-violence message	11 (New Zealand), 35 (US)
June 1990	"Sacrifice/Healing Hands"	Elton John	Aids Charities	1 (UK)
June 1990	"You've Got a Friend"	Big Fun, Sonia, featuring Gary Barnacle on saxophone	ChildLine	14 (UK)
July 1990	"Nobody's Child"	Traveling Wilburys	Romanian Angel Appeal	44 (UK)
November 1990	"Let's Dance"	Bruno and Liz and the Radio 1 DJ Possee	Children in Need	54 (UK)
November 1990	"Rap Against Rape"	Jocks & CO	Rape Crisis Center	16 (IRE)
February 1991	"Voices that Care"	Voices that Care	To boost the morale of U.S. troops involved in Operation Desert Storm	11 (US), 61 (Canada)
March 1991	"The Stonk"	Hale and Pace (backing band includes David Gilmour)	Comic Relief	1 (UK)
August 1991	"Stop the War in Croatia"	Tomislav Ivčić and children	Children in Croatia	7 (Australia)
November 1991	"Don't Let the Sun Go Down on Me"	George Michael, Elton John	10 charities for AIDS, children and education	1 (UK, US, Netherlands)
December 1991	"Bohemian Rhapsody"	Queen	Terrance Higgins Trust	1 (UK)
March 1992	"One"	U2	Proceeds going towards AIDS research	7 (UK), 1 (Ireland), 10 (US), 4 (Australia)
April 1992	"(I Want To Be) Elected"	Smear Campaign (Bruce Dickinson, Rowan Atkinson, Angus Deayton)	Comic Relief	9 (UK)
September 1992	"Suicide Is Painless"	Manic Street Preachers	The Spastics Society (now SCOPE)	7 (UK)
November 1992	"Heal the World"	Michael Jackson	Heal the World Foundation	1 (Spain), 2 (UK, Ireland, Australia), 4 (Netherlands)
February 1993	"Tell Me Why"	Genesis	A royalty from the single was donated to the Bosnian Save the Children and Red Cross charities.	40 (UK)
February 1993	"Stick It Out"	Right Said Fred and friends	Comic Relief	4 (UK)
May 1993	Five Live	George Michael, Queen and Lisa Stansfield	Mercury Phoenix Trust	1 (UK)
April 1994	"Watch Your House for Ireland"	Coca-Cola Republic of Ireland national football team	GOAL charity	1 (Ireland)
May 1994	"Absolutely Fabulous"	Pet Shop Boys with Jennifer Saunders and Joanna Lumley (of the television series Absolutely Fabulous)	Comic Relief	6 (UK), 2 (Australia)
August 1994	"Love Can Build a Bridge"	Children for Rwanda	Save the Children	57 (UK)
October 1994	"What's Going On"	Music Relief '94	Rwandan genocide	70 (UK)
February 1995	"Land"	Midnight Oil, Daniel Lanois, Hothouse Flowers, Crash Vegas, The Tragically Hip	Protest Logging	63 (Australia)
March 1995	"Love Can Build a Bridge"	Cher, Chrissie Hynde, Neneh Cherry and Eric Clapton	Comic Relief	1 (UK), 41 (Netherlands)
November 1995	"You Better Believe It (Children in Need)"	Patsy Palmer and Sid Owen	Children in Need	60 (UK)
November 1995	"Come Together"	Smokin' Mojo Filters	War Child	19 (UK)
November 1995	"Earth Song"	Michael Jackson	Heal the World Foundation, Environmental Awareness	1 (UK, Spain Sweden), 3 (Netherlands)
November 1995	"The Gift of Christmas"	Childliners	ChildLine	9 (UK)
October 1996	"God Bless the Child"	Shania Twain	Second Harvest/Kids Cafe	75 (US)
November 1996	"When Children Rule The World"	Red Hill Children	Children in Need	40 (UK)
December 1996	"Knockin' on Heaven's Door/Throw These Guns Away"	Ted Christopher (aka Dunblane), Mark Knopfler	Aid of victims of the Dunblane massacre	1 (UK)
December 1996	"Goodbye Girl"	Shane O'Donoghue and Paul Harrington	2FM Christmas Appeal	14 (Ireland)
March 1997	"Mama"/"Who Do You Think You Are"^{1}	The Spice Girls	Comic Relief	1 (UK), 13 (Australia), 3 (Netherlands)
September 1997	"Candle in the Wind 1997"/"Something About The Way You Look Tonight"	Elton John	Diana, Princess of Wales Memorial Fund	1 (US, UK, Australia, Netherlands)
October 1997	"Perfect Day"	Various Artists, see specific article for full list	Children in Need	1 (UK), 6 (Netherlands)
November 1997	"What If"	Reba McEntire	The Salvation Army	50 (US)
May 1998	"Let the Music Heal Your Soul"	Bravo All Stars	Nordoff–Robbins music therapy	36 (UK)
November 1998	"Especially for You"	Denise van Outen and Johnny Vaughan featuring Steps	Children in Need	3 (UK)
March 1999	"When the Going Gets Tough, the Tough Get Going"	Boyzone	Comic Relief	1 (UK)
September 1999	"New Day"	Wyclef Jean and Bono	NetAid	23 (UK)
November 1999	"Talking in Your Sleep/Love Me"	Martine McCutcheon	Children in Need	6 (UK)
December 1999	"The Millennium Prayer"	Cliff Richard	Children's Promise	1 (UK)
December 1999	"It's Only Rock 'n Roll (But I Like It)"	Various Artists	Children's Promise	14 (UK)

- ^1 "Who Do You Think You Are" is the Comic Relief side

=== 2000s ===
Release date	Title	Artists	Charity/Cause	Highest Chart Position
December 2000	"Never Had a Dream Come True"	S Club 7	Children in Need	1 (UK), 10 (US)
December 2000	"If That Were Me"	Melanie C	Kandu Arts	18 (UK), 22 (Sweden), 29 (Australia), 41 (Netherlands)
March 2001	"Uptown Girl"	Westlife	Comic Relief	1 (UK), 6 (Australia), 2 (Netherlands)
September 2001	"The Star-Spangled Banner"	Whitney Houston	9/11 charities	6 (US; 2001 reissue only)
September 2001	"El Ultimo Adios (The Last Goodbye)"	Various Latin American Artists	9/11 charities	197 (US)
October 2001	"What's Going On"	All Star Tribute	Artists Against AIDS Worldwide and 9/11 victims	27 (US), 6 (UK), 38 (Australia), 26 (Netherlands)
November 2001	"Have You Ever"	S Club 7	Children in Need	1 (UK), 48 (Australia)
December 2001	"Cry"	Michael Jackson	9/11 Relief	16 (Denmark), 39 (Netherlands)
December 2001	"Never Too Far/Hero Medley"	Mariah Carey	9/11 victims	5 (Japan), 81 (US), 67 (Netherlands)
May 2002	"65 Roses"	The Wolverines	Cystic fibrosis research	23 (Australia), #1 (New Zealand)
May 2002	"Here Come the Good Times"	The Irish World Cup Squad featuring Various Artists	Our Lady's Children's Hospital, Crumlin	1 (Ireland)
July 2002	"Your Song"	Elton John and Alessandro Safina	Sport Relief	4 (UK), 88 (Netherlands)
November 2002	"Don't Let Me Down/You and I"	Will Young	Children in Need	2 (UK)
December 2002	"Nothing Sacred – A Song for Kirsty"	Russell Watson	Kirsty Appeal	17 (UK)
March 2003	"Spirit in the Sky"	Gareth Gates and the Kumars	Comic Relief	1 (UK), 11 (Netherlands)
April 2003	"Soldier's Heart"	R. Kelly	the families of American soldiers	80 (US)
September 2003	"Pandora's Kiss/Don't Give Up"	Louise	Breast Cancer Care	5 (UK)
November 2003	"I'm Your Man"	Shane Richie	Children in Need	2 (UK)
March 2004	"Macushla"	Bernie Nolan	Stllbirth and Neo – Natal Death Society	38 (UK)
July 2004	"Some Girls"	Rachel Stevens	Sport Relief	2 (UK)
September 2004	"I Hope You Dance"	Ronan Keating	Brest Cancer Care	2 (UK)
November 2004	"I'll Stand By You"	Girls Aloud	Children in Need	1 (UK), 85 (Netherlands)
November 2004	"Do They Know It's Christmas?"	Band Aid 20	famine in Ethiopia	1 (UK), 9 (Australia), 3 (Netherlands)
November 2004	"Y'a pas un homme qui soit né pour ça"	Sidaction (Florent Pagny / Calogero / Pascal Obispo)	AIDS	20 (France)
December 2004	"Twelve Days of Christmas"	Dreamtime Christmas All-Stars	Starlight Foundation and Youth Off the Streets	26 (Australia)
December 2004	"Against All Odds (Take a Look at Me Now)"	Steve Brookstein	Asian Tsunami Fund	1 (UK)
December 2004	"Father And Son"	Ronan Keating featuring Yusuf Islam	Band Aid Foundation	2 (UK), 84 (Netherlands)
December 2004	"Come on Aussie, Come On"	Shannon Noll	Australian Red Cross' Good Start Breakfast Club	2 (Australia)
December 2004	"We are the world (Cantonese)"	Various Chinese Artists	2004 Indian Ocean earthquake	1 (Hong Kong)
January 2005	"Grief Never Grows Old"	One World Project	2004 Asian tsunami relief	4 (UK)
January 2005	"Hvor små vi er"	Giv til Asien	2004 Asian tsunami relief	1 (Denmark)
February 2005	"Evie Parts 1, 2 and 3"	The Wrights	Stevie Wright, The Salvation Army and 2004 Asian tsunami relief	2 (Australia)
March 2005	"All About You/You've Got a Friend"	McFly	Comic Relief	1 (UK)
March 2005	"Is This the Way to Amarillo?"	Tony Christie featuring Peter Kay	Comic Relief	1 (UK)
March 2005	"You're the First, the Last, My Everything"	Howard Brown	NSPCC	13 (UK)
July 2005	"Sgt. Pepper's Lonely Hearts Club Band"	Paul mcCartney and U2	Global Call to Action Against Poverty	41 (US)
July 2005	"Anchor Me"	Greenpeace	Sinking of the Rainbow Warrior	3 (New Zealand)
August 2005	"Reaching Out"	Queen + Paul Rodgers	Rock Therapy	33 (Netherlands)
October 2005	"Do They Know It's Hallowe'en?"	The North American Hallowe'en Prevention Initiative	UNICEF	4 (Canada)
October 2005	"We Laughed"	Rosetta Life featuring Billy Bragg	Trimar Hospice	11 (UK)
November 2005	"A Night to Remember"	Liberty X	Children in Need	6 (UK)
April 2006	"Real Soon"	DPGC featuring Snoop Dogg, Kurupt, Daz Dillinger and Nate Dogg	support the clemency for Stanley Williams	49 (Australia)
July 2006	"Please, Please/Don't Stop Me Now"	Mcfly	Sport Relief	1 (UK)
July 2006	"L'Or de nos vies"	Fight Aids	F.A.M. (Fight Aids Monaco)	5 (France)
August 2006	"Something In the Air"	Hayley Sanderson	TreeHouse	61 (UK)
October 2006	"Janie Jones"	Babyshambles	Strummerville	17 (UK)
November 2006	"The Saints Are Coming"	U2 and Green Day	Hurricane Katrina	2 (UK)
November 2006	"Downtown"	Emma Bunton	Children in Need	3 (UK)
March 2007	"Walk This Way"	Girls Aloud vs. Sugababes	Comic Relief	1 (UK)
March 2007	"I'm Gonna Roll (500 Miles)"	Matt Lucas (as Andy Pipkin) and Peter Kay (as Brian Potter)	Comic Relief	1 (UK)
April 2007	"I'll Stand By You"	Carrie Underwood	Idol Gives Back	6 (US)
May 2007	"Hey You"	Madonna	Live Earth	57 (Canada)
June 2007	"Any Dream Will Do"	Lee Mead	Children in Need	2 (UK)
October 2007	"Sing"	Annie Lennox in collaboration with Madonna and 22 other artists	HIV/AIDS organization Treatment Action Campaign	29 (U.S. Adult Contemporary) 18 (U.S. Hot Club Play) 161 (UK)
November 2007	"Headlines (Friendship Never Ends)"	Spice Girls	Children in Need	11 (UK), 90 (US), 52 (Netherlands)
December 2007	"What A Wonderful World"	Eva Cassidy and Katie Melua	British Red Cross	1 (UK)
February 2008	"The Ballad of Ronnie Drew"	U2, The Dubliners, Kíla and A Band of Bowsies	Irish Cancer Society	1 (Ire)
March 2008	"Better in Time/Footprints in the Sand"	Leona Lewis	Sport Relief	2 (UK)
August 2008	"Look Out Sunshine!"	The Fratellis	Teenage Cancer Trust	1 (Scot), 70 (UK)
September 2008	"Just Stand Up!"	Mariah Carey, Beyoncé, Mary J. Blige, Rihanna, Fergie, Sheryl Crow, Melissa Etheridge, Natasha Bedingfield, Miley Cyrus, Leona Lewis, Carrie Underwood, Keyshia Cole, LeAnn Rimes, Ashanti, Ciara	Stand Up to Cancer	11 (US), 3 (Italy), 10 (Canada), 26 (UK), 39 (Australia)
October 2008	"Náttúra"	Björk and Thom Yorke	protection of the Icelandic environment	39 (Sweden)
October 2008	"Hero"	The X Factor Finalists	Help for Heroes	1 (UK)
November 2008	"Get Up on the Dance Floor/Headz Up"	George Sampson	Great Ormond Street Hospital	30 (UK)
November 2008	"Do Ya/Stay with Me"	McFly	Children in Need	18 (UK)
December 2008	"Once Upon a Christmas Song"	Geraldine McQueen	NSPCC	5 (UK)
March 2009	"Do You Believe"	Julie-Anne Dineen	Cancer Research	1 (Ireland)
March 2009	"Just Can't Get Enough"	The Saturdays	Comic Relief	2 (UK)
March 2009	"(Barry) Islands in the Stream"	Vanessa Jenkins, and Bryn West featuring Tom Jones and Robin Gibb	Comic Relief	1 (UK)
March 2009	"The Haggis"	Clax	Comic Relief	1 (Scot)
May 2009	"Domani 21/04.09"	50+ artists, including Mauro Pagani (original recording from 2003), Afterhours, Albano Carrisi, Claudio Baglioni, Elisa, Franco Battiato, Gianna Nannini, Gianni Morandi, Giorgia, Giusy Ferreri, J-Ax, Jovanotti, Laura Pausini, Ligabue, Marracash, Negramaro, Tiziano Ferro, Zucchero and many more.	2009 L'Aquila earthquake	1 (Italy)
August 2009	"Send It On"	Demi Lovato, Jonas Brothers, Miley Cyrus, Selena Gomez	Disney's Friends for Change	20 (US)
October 2009	"I Got Soul"	Young Soul Rebels	War Child UK	10 (UK), 19 (Ireland)
November 2009	"I've Got Nothing"	Chartjackers	Children in Need	36 (UK)
November 2009	"You Are Not Alone"	The X Factor Finalists	Great Ormond Street Hospital	1 (UK), 1 (Ireland)
November 2009	"The Official BBC Children in Need Medley"	Peter Kay's Animated All Star Band	Children in Need	1 (UK), 6 (Ireland)

=== 2010s ===
Release date	Title	Artists	Charity/Cause	Highest Chart Position
January 2010	"Oh Africa"	Akon, Keri Hilson	Konfidence	56 (UK), 4 (Hungary)
February 2010	"Everybody Hurts"	Alexandra Burke, Cheryl Cole, JLS, James Blunt, James Morrison, Joe McElderry, Jon Bon Jovi, Kylie Minogue, Leona Lewis, Mariah Carey, Michael Bublé, Mika, Miley Cyrus, Robbie Williams, Rod Stewart, Susan Boyle, Take That, Westlife	2010 Haiti earthquake relief	1 (UK)
February 2010	"We Are the World 25 for Haiti"	70+ artists, including Michael Jackson (original recording from 1985), Akon, Tony Bennett, Brandy, Toni Braxton, Harry Connick Jr., Miley Cyrus, Celine Dion, Snoop Dogg, Josh Groban, Jennifer Hudson, Enrique Iglesias, LL Cool J, Janet Jackson, Kanye West, Gladys Knight, Jason Mraz, Pink, Carlos Santana, Jordin Sparks, Barbra Streisand, Usher, etc.	2010 Haiti earthquake relief	2 (US)
February 2010	"Make a Wave"	Demi Lovato and Joe Jonas	Disney's Friends for Change	84 (US)
March 2010	"Wavin' Flag"	K'naan, Nelly Furtado, Sam Roberts, Avril Lavigne, Pierre Bouvier, Tyler Connolly, Kardinal Offishall, Jully Black, LIGHTS, Deryck Whibley, Serena Ryder, Jacob Hoggard, Emily Haines, Hawksley Workman, Drake, Chin Injeti, Ima, Pierre Lapointe, Elisapie Isaac, Esthero, Corb Lund, Fefe Dobson, Nikki Yanofsky, Matt Mays, Justin Nozuka and Justin Bieber, etc.	2010 Haiti earthquake relief	1 (Canada)
March 2010	"Somos El Mundo 25 Por Haiti"	Artists for Haiti	2010 Haiti earthquake relief	31 (Spain)
March 2010	"Morning Sun"	Robbie Williams	Sport Relief	45 (UK)
March 2010	"Autumn"	Sarah Phillips	Cancer Research	49 (UK)
May 2010	"Donna d'Onna"	Gianna Nannini, Laura Pausini, Giorgia, Elisa & Fiorella Mannoia	2009 L'Aquila earthquake	8 (Italy)
May 2010	"Over The Rainbow"	Danielle Hope	BBC Performing Arts Fund and Prostate UK	29 (UK)
September 2010	"This Little Light"	LZ7	Shine Your Light	26 (UK)
October 2010	"In the Army Now"	Status Quo and the Corps of Army Choir	Royal British Legion and Help for Heroes	31 (UK)
November 2010	"Love You More"	JLS	Children in Need	1 (UK)
November 2010	"Heroes"	The X Factor 2010 Finalists	Help for Heroes	1 (UK)
December 2010	"Happy Pledis 1st Album"	After School	Save the Children	8 (South Korea)
December 2010	"Boots"	The Killers	Product Red	53 (UK)
February 2011	"Just the Way You Are (Drunk at the Bar)"	Brian McFadden	Rape Victims	49 (Australia)
March 2011	"Gold Forever"	The Wanted	Comic Relief	3 (UK)
March 2011	"I Know Him So Well"	Geraldine McQueen and Susan Boyle	Comic Relief	11 (UK)
March 2011	"You & Me"	Superfly"	victims of the 2011 Tōhoku earthquake and tsunami in Japan.	4 (Japan Hot 100)
March 2011	"Side by Side"	Feeder	victims of the 2011 Tōhoku earthquake and tsunami in Japan.	57 (Japan), 91 (UK)
April 2011	"Dareka no Tame ni (What Can I Do for Someone?)" (ja)	AKB48	2011 Tōhoku earthquake and tsunami relief	17 (Billboard Japan), 2 (RIAJ)
July 2011	"Freedom for Palestine"	Various	War on Want	79 (UK)
July 2011	"Don't Let Go (In This Together)"	Aleksander Walmann	2011 Norway attacks relief	5 (Norway)
November 2011	"Wishing on a Star"	JLS, One Direction, and The X Factor Finalists 2011	Together for Short Lives	1 (UK)
November 2011	"2 Minute Silence"	Royal British Legion	The Royal British Legion	20 (UK)
December 2011	"Forever Yours"	Alex Day	World Vision	4 (UK)
December 2011	"Wherever You Are (Military Wives song)"	Military Wives featuring Gareth Malone	Royal British Legion and SSAFA Forces Help	1 (UK)
January 2012	"Cuestión de Príoridades por el Cuerno de África"	Melendi featuring Dani Martín, Pablo Alborán, La Dama, Rasel, Malú and Carlos Baute	Horn of Africa famine	36 (PROMUSICAE Spanish chart)
January 2012	"Higher Love"	James Vincent McMorrow	Headstrong	4 (Ire), 21 (UK)
March 2012	"Proud"	JLS	Sport Relief	6 (UK)
May 2012	"The Rocky Road to Poland"	Damien Dempsey, The Dubliners, Bressie, Danny O'Reilly and Republic of Ireland national football team	Irish Cancer Society	1 (Ireland)
May 2012	"Sing"	Gary Barlow & The Commonwealth Band featuring Military Wives	Queen's Diamond Jubilee Trust	1 (UK)
August 2012	"Feel Inside (And Stuff Like That)"	Flight of the Conchords	the New Zealand children's health research charity Cure Kids	1 (New Zealand)
September 2012	"Ronan"	Taylor Swift	Stand Up to Cancer	16 (US)
November 2012	"A Song For Lily Mae"	Various Artists	Neuroblastoma research	1 (Ireland)
November 2012	"Something New"	Girls Aloud	Children in Need	2 (UK)
December 2012	"He Ain't Heavy, He's My Brother"	Justice Collective	Hillsborough disaster	1 (UK)
December 2012	"Impossible"	James Arthur	Together for Short Lives	1 (UK), 1 (Ireland), 2 (Australia)
February 2013	"One Way or Another (Teenage Kicks)"	One Direction	Comic Relief	1 (UK)
March 2013	"Let's Get Ready to Rhumble"	PJ & Duncan	Childline	1 (UK)
May 2013	"Clouds"	Zach Sobiech	Zach Sobiech Osteosarcoma Fund	50 (UK)
June 2013	"Sensitive to a Smile"	Aotearoa Reggae All Stars	violence-free parenting advocacy charity Mana Ririki	2 (New Zealand)
August 2013	"Woman's World"	Cher	GlobalGiving	26 (Switzerland)
October 2013	"I'll See Your Face One Day"	Jonathan Cordiner	Ellon Wheel Park development fund.	(15 Scot)
November 2013	"I Will Be Here"	Edvin Berg feat. Idol (Sweden)	Cancer research	27 (Sweden)
November 2013	"The Call (No Need To Say Goodbye)"	Poppy Girls	The Royal British Legion	13 (UK)
December 2013	"Skyscraper"	Sam Bailey	Great Ormond Street Hospital, Together for Short Lives	1 (UK)
December 2013	"I Wish It Could Be Christmas Everyday"	Five, 911, Atomic Kitten, B*Witched, Blue, Honeyz and Liberty X	Age UK, Barnardo's, BeatBullying,British Heart Foundation, CLIC Sargent and Help the Hospices.	21 (UK)
February 2014	"Invisible"	U2	Product Red	6 (Italy)
February 2014	"Royals/"White Noise"(Live from the Brits)	Disclosure and Lorde	War Child	72 (UK)
March 2014	"Word Up!"	Little Mix	Sport Relief	6 (UK)
April 2014	"Heart of Glass"	Gisele and Bob Sinclar	H&M 2013	27 (Spain)
June 2014	"Hope Ain't a Bad Thing"	The Neon Brotherhood	Teenage Cancer Trust	16 (UK)
September 2014	"Kiss & Love"	Sidaction	AIDS	47 (France)
October 2014	"To Me, To You (Bruv)"	Tinchy Stryder & the Chuckle Brothers	African-Caribbean Leukaemia Trust	92 (UK)
October 2014	"God Only Knows"	Brian Wilson and Various	Children in Need	20 (UK)
November 2014	"Wake Me Up"	Gareth Malone's All Star Choir	Children In Need	1 (UK)
November 2014	"Do They Know It's Christmas?"	Band Aid 30	Aid for those affected by Ebola	1 (UK)
November 2014	"No Man's Land (Green Fields Of France)"	Joss Stone featuring Jeff Beck	The Royal British Legion	49 (UK)
December 2014	"Something I Need"	Ben Haenow	Together for Short Lives	1 (UK)
December 2014	"Got No Fans"	The Wealdstone Raider	Great Ormond Street Hospital	5 (UK)
March 2015	"Lay Me Down"	Sam Smith featuring John Legend	Comic Relief	1 (UK)
March 2015	"We Love The Same (A Song for Equality)"	Choral Con Fusion lgbts Choir Cork	Marriag Equality and The Yes Campaign.	60 (Ireland)
April, 2015	"Fly"	Avril Lavigne	Special Olympics	92 (Canada)
August 2015	"Wonderful Life"	Katie Melua	Great Ormond Street Hospital and Sheffield Children's Hospital	73 (UK)
September 2015	"Team Ball Player Thing"	#KiwisCureBatten	research into Batten disease via the New Zealand charity Cure Kids	2 (New Zealand)
October, 2015	"I Was Me"	Imagine Dragons	One4 Project	30 (Spain)
December 2015	"A Bridge over You"	Lewisham and Greenwich NHS Choir	Healthcare charities including Carers UK and Mind	1 (UK)
March 2016	"Running"	James Bay	Sport Relief	60 (UK)
May 2016	"Flesh & Blood"	Invictus Games Choir and Gareth Malone	Invictus Games Foundation	29 (UK)
June 2016	"I'll Be There"	The Neales	National Charity Partnership	22 (UK)
July 2016	"Love Make the World Go Round"	Jennifer Lopez and Lin-Manuel Miranda	Hispanic Federation's Somos Orlando fund	72 (US)
August 2016	"Where's the Love"	The Black Eyed Peas featuring The World	i.am.angel	47 (UK)
October 2016	"Fresh Eyes"	Andy Grammer	Union Rescue Mission, Los Angeles	84 (US)
December 2016	"When Christmas Comes Around"	Matt Terry	Together For Short Lives and Shooting Star Chase	3 (UK)
December 2016	"The Living Years"	London Hospices Choir/Paul Carrack	Various Hospices in London	81 (UK)
March 2017	"What Do I Know?"^{2}	Ed Sheeran and Kurupt FM	Comic Relief	9 (UK)
June 2017	"Bridge over Troubled Water"	"Artists for Grenfell": Angel, Anne-Marie, Bastille, Brian May, Carl Barât, Craig David, Deno, Donae'o, Dua Lipa, Ella Eyre, Ella Henderson, Emeli Sandé, Fleur East, Gareth Malone's All Star Choir, Geri Halliwell, Gregory Porter, James Arthur, James Blunt, Jessie J, Jessie Ware, John Newman, Jon McClure, Jorja Smith, Kelly Jones, Labrinth, Leona Lewis, Liam Payne, London Community Gospel Choir, Louis Tomlinson, Louisa Johnson, Matt Goss, Matt Terry, Mr Eazi, Nathan Skyes, Nile Rodgers, Omar, Paloma Faith, Pixie Lott, Ray BLK, Raye, Rita Ora, Robbie Williams, Shakka, Stormzy, The Who, Tokio Myers, Tom Grennan, Tony Hadley, Tulisa, WSTRN	Victims of the Grenfell Tower fire in North Kensington, London	1 (UK)
June 2017	"One Last Time"	Ariana Grande	We Love Manchester Emergency Fund	2 (UK)
June 2017	"Inspired"	Miley Cyrus	Happy Hippie Foundation	97 (Australia)
June 2017	"Smile for Bradley"	LIV'N'G	the Bradley Lowery Foundation	28 (UK)
July 2017	"Aliens"	Coldplay	Migrant Offshore Aid Station	87 (France)
October 2017	"Almost Like Praying"	Lin-Manuel Miranda, Jennifer Lopez, Camila Cabello, Gloria Estefan, Marc Anthony, John Leguizamo, Rubén Blades, Pedro Capó, Dessa, Luis Fonsi, Juan Luis Guerra, Alex Lacamoire, Rita Moreno, Ednita Nazario, Joell Ortiz, Anthony Ramos, Gina Rodriguez, Gilberto Santa Rosa, PJ Sin Suela, Ana Villafañe, Tommy Torres	Hispanic Federation's UNIDOS Disaster Relief and Recovery Program	20 (US)
December 2017	"Streets of London"	Ralph McTell and Annie Lennox	Crisis	92 (UK)
March 2018	"Found/Tonight"	Lin-Manuel Miranda and Ben Platt	March for Our Lives anti-gun violence movement	49 (US)
July 2018	"With A Little Help From My Friends"	"NHS Voices": Alexandra Burke, Ali Campbell, Astro, Aston Merrygold, Ben Willis, Beverley Knight, Blue, Chris Difford, Coleen Nolan, Danny Jones, Dennis Greaves, Engelbert Humperdinck, Gabrielle, Gary Stringer, Glenn Tilbrook, Guy Garvey, HRVY, Jack and Tim, Lewisham and Greenwich NHS Choir, Louisa Johnson, Marina and the Diamonds, Mark Feltham, Mark King, Myleene Klass, Nile Rodgers, Rick Astley, Seal, Simon Hanson, Tom Smith, Tony Hadley, Una Healy	NHS Charities Together	89 (UK)
October 2018	"Killer Queen"	5 Seconds of Summer	Fighting Against Hiv/Aids	18 (New Zealand)
December 2018	"The Power of Love"	Dalton Harris featuring James Arthur	Together For Short Lives and Shooting Star Children's Hospices	4 (UK)
December 2018	"We Built This City (On Sausage Rolls)"	LadBaby	in aid of The Trussell Trust.	1 (UK)
April 2019	"Earth"	Lil Dicky, Justin Bieber, Ariana Grande, Halsey, Zac Brown, Brendon Urie, Hailee Steinfeld, Wiz Khalifa, Snoop Dogg, Kevin Hart, Adam Levine, Shawn Mendes, Charlie Puth, Sia, Miley Cyrus, Lil Jon, Rita Ora, Miguel, Katy Perry, Lil Yachty, Ed Sheeran, Meghan Trainor, Joel Embiid, Tory Lanez, John Legend, Psy, Bad Bunny, Kris Wu, Backstreet Boys, Leonardo DiCaprio	Climate change - through the Leonardo DiCaprio Foundation.	17 (US), 21 (UK)
May 2019	"Let Nature Sing"	RSPB	Royal Society for the Protection of Birds	18 (UK)
June 2019	"Sad Forever"	Lauv	Time to Change and Beyond Blue	18 (New Zealand)
August 2019	"Looking for America"	Lana Del Rey	Gilroy Garlic Festival Victims Relief fund	52 (Scot)
October 2019	"Orphans"	Coldplay	refugee charity Hopeland	27 (UK)
November 2019	"Yellow"	Jodie Whittaker	Children in Need	16 (Scot)
December 2019	"Run"	X Factor Celebrities	Together For Short Lives and Shooting Star Children's Hospices	87 (UK)
December 2019	"I Love Sausage Rolls"	LadBaby	in aid of The Trussell Trust.	1 (UK)
December 2019	"Running the World"	Jarvis Cocker and The Kaiser Quartet	aid of Shelter.	48 (UK)

- ^2 Unlike the single by Sam Smith in 2015, the charity version of "What Do I Know?" was combined with the original's sales when calculating the chart position with no official listing for Kurupt FM.

=== 2020s ===
Release date	Title	Artists	Charity/Cause	Highest Chart Position
January 2020	"Let It Rain"	Delta Goodrem	2019–20 Australian bushfire season	90 (Australia)
January 2020	"My Way"	Margaret Mackie and Jamie Lee Morley	The Alzheimer's Society and Dementia UK	2 (Scot)
February 2020	"Monsters"	James Blunt	Help for Heroes and British Legion	74 (UK)
March 2020	"Dance Again"	Selena Gomez	MusiCares COVID-19 Relief Fund	14 (New Zealand), 96 (Canada)
April 2020	"Fight as One"	Eason Chan and Taiwanese singer Jolin Tsai	COVID-19 Solidarity Response Fund	15 (China)
April 2020	"You Taught Me What Love Is"	Beth Porch	NHS Charities Together and Great Ormond Street Hospital for Children NHS Foundation Trust	25 (UK)
April 2020	"Thank You Baked Potato"	Matt Lucas	The FeedNHS Campaign	34 (UK)
April 2020	"You'll Never Walk Alone"	Michael Ball, Captain Tom Moore, The NHS Voices of Care Choir	NHS Charities Together	1 (UK)
April 2020	"Times Like These"	Live Lounge Allstars	COVID-19 Solidarity Response Fund, Children in Need, Comic Relief	1 (UK)
April 2020	"Lean On Me"	ArtistsCAN	Canadian Red Cross	13 (Canada)
April 2020	"Uuden edessä"	Toivon kärki	COVID-19 Solidarity Response Fund	2 (Finland)
April 2020	"Level of Concern"	Twenty One Pilots	Crew Nation	23 (US), 42 (UK)
April 2020	"Kivotos"	Katy Garbi featuring Antonis Remos	Kivotos tou Kosmou.	1 (Cyprus), 9 (Greece)
April 2020	"Resistiré México"	Artists for Mexico	COVID-19 pandemic in Mexico	4 (Mexico)
May 2020	"Stuck with U"	Ariana Grande, Justin Bieber	First Responders Children's Foundation	4 (UK), 1 (US)
May 2020	"Savage (Remix)"	Megan Thee Stallion featuring Beyoncé	Bread of Life	1 (US) 3 (UK)
May 2020	"Saved My Life"	Sia	AmeriCares and CORE Response	79 (Switzerland)
June 2020	"Black Parade"	Beyoncé	BeyGOOD's Black Business Impact Fund, administered by the National Urban League	37 (US), 49 (UK)
June 2020	"Dreams"	Irish Women in Harmony	Safe Ireland	15 (Ireland)
July 2020	"You Are My Sunshine"	Gareth Malone, London Symphony Orchestra and participants in the Great British Home Chorus initiative	NHS Charities Together.	57 (UK), 1 (Scot)
August 2020	"Smile"	Twenty★Twenty	COVID-19 Solidarity Response Fund	1 (Japan Hot 100)
August 2020	"Love on Top"	The Bellas	UNICEF	26 (Scot)
September 2020	"Elle S'appelle Beyrouth"	Khaled and DJ Rodge	Various charities for the victims of the 2020 Port of Beirut Explosion, including Global Citizen and Lebanese Red Cross.	1 (Lebanon)
November 2020	"Four Notes – Paul's Tune"	Paul Harvey and BBC Philharmonic	Alzheimer's Society and Music for Dementia	32 (UK), 1 (Scot)
November 2020	"Stop Crying Your Heart Out"	BBC Radio 2 Allstars	Children In Need	7 (UK)
November 2020	"Protect the Land" / "Genocidal Humanoidz"	System of a Down	Armenia Fund	20 (New Zealand), 88 (Canada)
December 2020	"Don't Stop Me Eatin'"	LadBaby	in aid of The Trussell Trust.	1 (UK)
December 2020	"Holy"	Justin Bieber and The Lewisham and Greenwich Choir	NHS Charities Together	41 (UK)
March 2021	"Midnight Blue (Love Streaming)"	B.I	World Vision, to support children in crisis across the globe.	14 (South Korea)
May 2021	"Anywhere Away from Here"	Rag'n'Bone Man, Pink and The Lewisham and Greenwich Choir	Lewisham and Greenwich NHS Trust, NHS Charities Together	9 (UK)
June 2021	"Waterfall"	B.I	The "Basic for Girls" project.	6 (South Korea)
November 2021	"Everywhere"	Niall Horan and Anne-Marie	Children In Need	23 (UK), 49 (Ireland)
December 2021	"Merry Christmas"	Ed Sheeran and Elton John	AIDS Healthcare Foundation	1 (UK)
December 2021	"Sausage Rolls for Everyone"	LadBaby featuring Ed Sheeran and Elton John	in aid of The Trussell Trust.	1 (UK)
April 2022	"Hey, Hey, Rise Up!"	Pink Floyd featuring Andriy Khlyvnyuk	in aid of Stand Up For Ukraine	49 (UK)
December 2022	"Food Aid" LadBaby achieved the Christmas number one for the fifth consecutive year, making them the first act to achieve five UK Christmas number-one singles, surpassing the record set by the Beatles.	LadBaby	in aid of The Trussell Trust and Band Aid Trust.	1 (UK)
March 2023	"People Help the People"	Artiesten voor 12-12	Syria Turkey 1212	1 (Belgium)
October 2023	"Rajieen" All of the revenue generated by the song was donated to the Palestine Children's Relief Fund.	Saif Safadi, Dana Salah, Ghaliaa Chaker, Afroto, Nordo, Shroof, A5rass, Issam Alnajjar, Amir Eid, Balti, Wessam Qutob, Dina El Wedidi, Bataineh, Omar Rammal, Alyoung, Randar, Vortex, Small X, A.L.A, Fuad Gritli, Donia Wael, Zeyne, Marwan Moussa, Dafencii and Marwan Pablo	Palestine Children's Relief Fund	2 (Egypt)
December 2023	"I Wish It Could Be Christmas Everyday"	Creator Universe	The Trussell Trust	29 (UK)
March 2024	"Going Home (Theme from Local Hero)" The sessions were recorded at British Grove Studios, although some performances were submitted remotely.	Mark Knopfler's Guitar Heroes	Teenage Cancer Trust and Teen Cancer America	18 (UK), 32 (NZ)
May 2024	"Hind's Hall"	Macklemore	pro-Palestinian protests on university campuses	61 (Canada), 51 (UK), 33 (NZ)
December 2024	"Do They Know It's Christmas?"	Band Aid 40	Crisis in Ethiopia	8 (UK)
December 2024	"Freezing This Christmas"	Sir Starmer and the Granny Harmers	Elderly Charities	37 (UK)
July 2025	"Changes"	Yungblud, Nuno Bettencourt, and Frank Bello featuring Adam Wakeman and II	Acorns Children's Hospice, Birmingham Children's Hospital and Cure Parkinson's.	90 (UK), 17 (New Zealand)
December 2025	"Lullaby"	Together for Palestine	Choose Love	5 (UK)
January 2026	"Light of a Clear Blue Morning"	Dolly Parton featuring Lainey Wilson, Miley Cyrus, Queen Latifah, Reba McEntire, The Christ Church Choir and David Foster	Pediatric Cancer Research	36 (New Zealand)
January 2026	"Opening Night"	Arctic Monkeys	War Child	16 (UK)
