= Shayfeen =

Moroccan hip-hop duo (2006-2021)

- Born: Chouaib Ribati (Shobee), Abdessamad Lamriq (Small X)
- Origin: Safi, Morocco
- Genres: rap, trap music
- Years active: 2006-2021
- Members: None
- Past members: Small X, Shobee (rapper)

Shayfeen was a Moroccan hip-hop duo composed of rappers Small X and Shobee, recognized for their dynamic flows and lyrics centered on themes of ambition, money, and motivation. The duo has cultivated a substantial fanbase not only in Morocco and North Africa but also internationally, thanks to their catchy music and collaborations with international artists like Laylow and Lacrim.

After maintaining a successful musical partnership for more than 15 years, the duo parted ways in 2021 to pursue independent solo careers.

== Career ==
In 2010, following a successful performance at the Génération Mawazine festival, Shayfeen released their debut mixtape, Energie, featuring 15 tracks. This project marked their entry into the Moroccan hip-hop scene. In early 2015, they dropped their first EP, 07—a title referencing their hometown of Safi—which included seven songs and further showcased their evolving style.

A major breakthrough came in 2018 with the release of "Tcha Ra", a collaborative track featuring ElGrandeToto, Madd, Ouenza, and West. The song became a hit. That same year, Shayfeen joined Naar, an international artist collective, and contributed to the album Safar (2019), expanding their reach beyond Morocco. Shayfeen has released several successful singles, including "Wach Kayn Maydar" (Is There Something to do) and "7it 3arfini" (Cuz They Know Me). They have also collaborated with various Moroccan and international artists, such as Dizzy Dros, Tagne, 7liwa, Lacrim, Lomepal and Manal.

In 2018, the duo's journey was documented in Wa Drari, a film directed by Fatim Zahra Bencherki and produced by Nabil Ayouch. The documentary, which aired on 2M, explores their rise in the music industry and the challenges they faced as young artists pursuing their dreams. Bencherki described the film as an effort to "show how very young people take the risk of becoming artists and following their dreams, however crazy they may be." Wa Drari received critical acclaim, winning two awards at the 2019 Mediterranean in Images festival, including the prestigious PRIMED: International Prize for Mediterranean Documentary and Reporting.

== Style ==
Shayfeen's musical style and philosophy is summed in their energetic and versatile approach to hip-hop. The duo is known for their dynamic flows, sharp lyricism, and ability to blend various influences into their music. Their style is deeply rooted in Moroccan culture, particularly through their use of Darija (Moroccan Arabic), while also incorporating global hip-hop elements, making their sound both locally resonant and internationally appealing.

Shayfeen's philosophy revolves around motivation and ambition. They focus on creating music that reflects their personal experiences and aspirations, often addressing themes like success, perseverance, and the challenges of pursuing dreams in a competitive industry.

Shayfeen also emphasizes the importance of hard work and continuous growth, encapsulated by the phrase "l'appétit vient en mangeant" (appetite comes with eating), which suggests that their hunger for success grows as they achieve more. This mindset has driven their evolution as artists, allowing them to experiment with new sounds and expand their reach both within Morocco and beyond.

== Discography ==
=== Albums and EPs ===
- L'energie (2011)
- 07 (2015)

=== Singles ===
- "Khalla Daro" (2009)
- "7amesni" (2009)
- "Hip Hop Flippa" (2010)
- "Marock" (With Shobee & Yassine Of Fez City Clan) (2010)
- "Ntouma Malkoum" (2010)
- "Motivated" (2011)
- "Sahbi" (2011)
- "Aji Tchoufna" (2011)
- "S.O.S To Freedom" (2012)
- "Aal Slama" (2012)
- "Would Asfi Boss" (2013)
- "Wach Katsma3 Oula" (Shobee Of Shayfeen) (2013)
- "Darss Dl'Flow" (2013)
- "Ghayb9aw Jouj" (2014)
- "Maghandwish" (2014)
- "7it 3arfinni" (2015)
- "YDF" (Small X Of Shayfeen) (2016)
- "Wach Kayn Maydar" (2017)
- "OMG" Feat. Tagne, Madd, West (2017)
- "Bzzaf" Feat. 7liwa (2017)
- "Nah" Feat. Manal (2018)'
- "For The Love" Feat. Madd, West, Nor, Jonas Benyoub (2018)
- "Tchara" Feat. Ouenza, ElGrandeToto, West (2018)'
- "Kssiri" Feat. Dosseh (2019)
- "HLG" (Small X Of Shayfeen) (2019)
- "L'VIBE" (Shobee Of Shayfeen) (2019)
- "BLESSED" (2019)
- "Koun Wajed" (2020)

== See also ==
- Moroccan Hip Hop
- ElGrandeToto
- Dizzy DROS
- Stormy
- 7liwa
