= Free Palestine Tour =

2026 benefit concerts by Macklemore and Friends

- Benefit tour by Macklemore (Note: Billed as Macklemore and Friends)
- Location: Dublin; Paris; London
- Start date: October 26, 2026
- End date: October 30, 2026
- Legs: 1
- No. of shows: 3
- Website: macklemore.com/free-palestine-tour/

Macklemore chronology
- The Ben Tour (2023–24); Free Palestine Tour (2026)

The Free Palestine Tour is a benefit concert tour by American rapper Macklemore (billed as Macklemore and Friends) with proceeds going to charities supporting Palestinians. The tour was announced on September 2026 as a result of the controversy that saw Macklemore dropped as a supporting artist from Ed Sheeran's Loop Tour due to pro-Palestine onstage actions. Three shows were held in Dublin, Paris, and London in October 2026, with U.S. dates to be announced at a later date.

== Background ==
On September 4 and 5, 2026, Macklemore made comments calling for a "free Palestine" and displayed images of the Gaza war while on stage as a supporting act for Sheeran's Loop Tour at MetLife Stadium in East Rutherford, New Jersey. He was subsequently removed from the tour on September 14, with stadium owner Robert Kraft accusing him of antisemitism. On September 24, Macklemore announced his own tour to benefit organizations supporting Palestinians, with three European shows scheduled for the end of October, and U.S. dates to be announced. The organizations and charities benefiting from the proceeds include Medical Aid for Palestinians, the Palestine Children's Relief Fund, Gaza Soup Kitchen, Jewish Voice for Peace, and UNRWA USA.

On November 6, Macklemore posted a statement accusing nine U.S. arenas of not wanting to host any tour dates, namely Madison Square Garden and Barclays Center in New York City, Prudential Center in Newark, UBS Arena in Elmont, Intuit Dome and Kia Forum in Inglewood, Crypto.com Arena in Los Angeles, Chase Center in San Francisco, and Climate Pledge Arena in Macklemore's hometown of Seattle. However, he said he would "keep working with other artists and organizers" to bring the tour to the U.S.

== European shows ==
The tour's first show was on October 26 at the 3Arena in Dublin, Ireland. Additional performers included hip-hop trio Kneecap, folk band Beoga, singer-songwriter Hozier, and Palestinian singer Lina Makoul. In addition, the show featured video messages from Mark Ruffalo, Cynthia Nixon, and Julian Casablancas and an appearance from Dead Prez. Hozier performed "Too Sweet", "Work Song", "Swan upon Leda", a cover of "The Prayer of Shiel", "From Eden", and "Take Me to Church".

The second show held on October 29 at Accor Arena in Paris featured Aurora, Pomme, Portugal. The Man, Siba, Tamer Nafar, Xiuhtezcatl Martinez, and Zeyne. Guest speakers at the show included Ahmed Shihab-Eldin, Carice van Houten, and Francesca Albanese, the UN Special Rapporteur on the occupied Palestinian territories, while Susan Sarandon and Javier Bardem delivered video messages. Aurora performed "The Seed", while Zeyne performed "Asli Ana".

At the third show held at Wembley Arena in London on October 30, Macklemore was joined by Aja Monet, Cure for Paranoia, Dana Salah, Nemahsis, Lucas Jones, Paloma Faith, Roze, Shadia Mansour, and Vic Mensa. Guest speakers included Greta Thunberg and Arab Barghouti, while Melissa Barrera was among the actors delivering video messages.

== Critical reception ==
Alexis Petridis of The Guardian praised the Dublin show, calling it "a worthwhile triumph". Imogen West-Knights of Slate complimented Macklemore's energy at the London show.

== Set list ==
This set list is from the Dublin concert and does not represent all shows.

1. "Chant" (with Tones and I)
2. "Thrift Shop"
3. "White Walls"
4. "Same Love" (with Mary Lambert)
5. "Hind's Hall"
6. "These Days"
7. "Glorious" (with Tones and I)
8. "Good Old Days" (with Tones and I)
9. "Where's Our Love"
10. "Can't Hold Us"

== Tour dates ==
List of concerts, showing date, city, country, venue, supporting acts and guest speakers
Date (2026)	City	Country	Venue	Supporting act(s)	Guest speaker(s)
October 26	Dublin	Ireland	3Arena	Kneecap; Beoga; Hozier; Lina Makoul	Dead Prez
October 29	Paris	France	Accor Arena	Aurora; Pomme; Portugal. The Man; Tamer Nafar; Xiuhtezcatl Martinez; Zeyne	Ahmed Shihab-Eldin; Carice van Houten; Francesca Albanese
October 30	London	England	OVO Arena Wembley	Aja Monet; Cure for Paranoia; Dana Salah; Nemahsis; Lucas Jones; Paloma Faith; Roze; Shadia Mansour; Vic Mensa	Greta Thunberg; Arab Barghouti
