= Shobee =

Moroccan rapper and record producer (born 1991)

Shobee شعيب رباطي
- Also known as: Shobee, Lone Wolf
- Born: Chouaib Ribati; May 12, 1991 (age 34)
- Origin: Safi, Morocco
- Genres: Trap; hip-hop
- Occupations: rapper, songwriter, music producer
- Years active: 2006-present
- Label: War Entertainment
- Formerly of: Shayfeen

Chouaib Ribati (Arabic: شعيب رباطي; born May 12, 1991) better known by his stage name Shobee, is a Moroccan rapper, songwriter and music producer. Shobee first gained widespread recognition as one half of the influential rap duo Shayfeen, alongside Abdessamad Lamriq, known as Small X.

For over a decade, this duo was one of the most influential hip hop acts in Moroccan rap. Together, they helped bring Moroccan rap to the international stage. They are sometimes credited with popularizing trap music in Morocco, alongside 7liwa. Shobee's influence expanded further through his involvement with the international NAAR collective to contribute to the album Safar.

Beyond his work with the group, Shobee also made a name for himself as a solo artist. He notably collaborated with Lomepal on the track “Ciel” and with Madd and Laylow on “Money Call”. Both songs amassed millions of streams on digital platforms. He has released several successful singles, such as "Tcha Ra" (2018), “L’Vibe” (2019), “Dat Way” (2020), “Makayn Tahed” (2021), and “Power – A ColorsxStudios” (2023). That same year, he dropped his debut solo album, titled Howls, which was also well received by audiences.

== Early life ==
Chouaib Ribati was born on May 12, 1991, in Safi, a coastal city in Morocco. His formative years in Safi exposed him to a diverse array of musical genres, which fostered his passion for music and ultimately led him to pursue rap and hip-hop.

== Career ==
=== As Shayfeen ===
In 2006, Shobee co-founded the rap duo Shayfeen with Abdessamad Lamriq, or Small X. This partnership quickly became a significant force within the burgeoning Moroccan hip-hop scene. Shayfeen distinguished themselves through their unique sound and compelling lyrics, which frequently explored themes of ambition, societal challenges, and personal experiences. They are credited with popularizing trap music to Morocco mid-2010s. This new style was initially met with some misunderstanding, but it subsequently gained immense popularity following the release of their 2016 EP "07".

In 2019, Shobee, as part of Shayfeen, joined the international artist collective NAAR. This affiliation provided a crucial platform for broader collaborations and significantly expanded their artistic reach beyond the borders of Morocco.

As a member of NAAR, Shobee contributed to the Safar album, released in 2019. This album notably featured his solo appearances and significant collaborations, including "Ciel" with Lomepal and "Money Call" with Madd and Laylow. These tracks garnered millions of listens across platforms, further propelling Shobee to the forefront of the music scene. Additional collaborations within the NAAR collective include "Can't Wait" with Amir Obè.

=== Solo ===
Following the disbandment of Shayfeen in 2021, Shobee fully transitioned into his solo career. His debut solo project, the album HOWLS, was released on June 22, 2023, featuring 18 tracks. In his solo work, Shobee continues to expand the artistic boundaries of Moroccan rap, showcasing his versatility as an artist. Lyrically, his compositions delve into themes of personal upbringing, societal observations, youth experiences, and ambition.

Shobee is particularly noted for his dynamic vocal delivery, which is often set against a backdrop of atmospheric, bass-heavy instrumentation. His ability to effortlessly switch between Arabic and English within his tracks is a defining characteristic of his unique sound. His transition to a solo career after Shayfeen's separation allowed him to further develop his unique artistic voice.

Other notable solo releases include the single "POWER - A COLORS SHOW," released on March 16, 2023, which was a standout track from his then-forthcoming debut album, making him the first Moroccan on ColorsxStudios. His solo discography also features "Makayn Tahed", "Dat Way", and "L'VIBE". His collaborative efforts are extensive, including tracks like "Train De Vie" (featuring Laylow), "Committed" (featuring Snor), and "Work" (featuring Madd), among many others.

== Reception and impact ==
His debut solo album, HOWLS, released in 2023, has garnered critical acclaim. A collective analysis by DimaTOP Magazine awarded the album an overall rating of 8.1/10, bestowing upon it a "TOP" rating for "Artistic Excellence & Impact". The review specifically highlighted its Lyricism (3.75/5), Flow and Delivery (4.42/5), Production (4.54/5), Coherence (4.21/5), and Impact and Influence (3.38/5). This strong positive reception for his solo debut indicates his continued artistic relevance and ability to produce impactful work.

His music has served as a catalyst for the "empowerment and emancipation of young Moroccans in the wake of the Arab Spring". Shobee's lyrical content frequently mirrors the realities and struggles faced by youth, employing indirect messages or slang that resonate deeply with his audience. He has articulated his artistic purpose as a "mission to push Moroccan youth to reach the end of their ambitions," demonstrating that success is attainable despite prevailing difficulties.

== Discography ==
=== As Shayfeen ===
- L’Energie (Mixtape, 2012)
- 07 (EP, 2016)

=== Solo ===
- HOWLS (Album, 2022)
