= Free Palestine =

"Free Palestine" is a slogan associated with Palestinian nationalism, anti-Zionism and Gaza war protests. It may also refer to:

== Music ==
- "Free Palestine", a 2024 song by Lebanese-Swedish singer Maher Zain
- "Freedom for Palestine", a 2011 song by largely UK-based collective OneWorld
- Free Palestine Tour, a 2026 European concert tour by American rapper Macklemore

== Politics ==
- "Free Palestine," the last words of US Air Force member Aaron Bushnell during his self-immolation in 2024
- Free Palestine (Australia), an anti-Hamas political party formed by Avi Yemini in 2026
- Free Palestine Movement, a community organization and former armed resistance group led by Palestinians in Syria, formed c. 2003
- Free Palestine Movement (California), a United States-based group affiliated with the Free Gaza Movement, a human rights coalition
- Free Palestine Party, a pro-Palestinian European political alliance formed in 2024
- Free Palestine Party (New Zealand), an anti-Zionist political party formed in 2026
- National March on Washington: Free Palestine, a 2023 protest at the National Mall in Washington, D.C.

== See also ==
- Freedom
- From the river to the sea
- Globalize the intifada
- Israeli-Palestinian conflict
