= List of number-one singles of 1994 (Ireland) =

The following is a list of the IRMA's number-one singles of 1994. Take That reached the top of the Irish charts for the first time, with "Babe".

Issue date	Song	Artist	Ref.
7 January	"Babe"	Take That	
14 January	"It's Alright"	East 17	
21 January	"All for Love"	Bryan Adams, Rod Stewart and Sting	
28 January	"All for Love"	Bryan Adams, Rod Stewart and Sting	
4 February	"All for Love"	Bryan Adams, Rod Stewart and Sting	
11 February	"Return to Innocence"	Enigma	
18 February	"Without You"	Mariah Carey	
25 February	"Without You"	Mariah Carey	
4 March	"Without You"	Mariah Carey	
11 March	"Without You"	Mariah Carey	
18 March	"Without You"	Mariah Carey	
25 March	"Streets of Philadelphia"	Bruce Springsteen	
1 April	"Streets of Philadelphia"	Bruce Springsteen	
8 April	"Streets of Philadelphia"	Bruce Springsteen	
15 April	"Streets of Philadelphia"	Bruce Springsteen	
22 April	"Streets of Philadelphia"	Bruce Springsteen	
29 April	"Watch Your House for Ireland"	Coca-Cola Official Irish Team	
5 May	"Riverdance"	Bill Whelan	
12 May	"Riverdance"	Bill Whelan	
19 May	"Riverdance"	Bill Whelan	
26 May	"Riverdance"	Bill Whelan	
2 June	"Riverdance"	Bill Whelan	
9 June	"Riverdance"	Bill Whelan	
16 June	"Riverdance"	Bill Whelan	
23 June	"Riverdance"	Bill Whelan	
30 June	"Riverdance"	Bill Whelan	
7 July	"Riverdance"	Bill Whelan	
14 July	"Riverdance"	Bill Whelan	
21 July	"Riverdance"	Bill Whelan	
28 July	"Riverdance"	Bill Whelan	
5 August	"Riverdance"	Bill Whelan	
12 August	"Riverdance"	Bill Whelan	
19 August	"Riverdance"	Bill Whelan	
26 August	"Riverdance"	Bill Whelan	
2 September	"Riverdance"	Bill Whelan	
9 September	"Guaglione"	Pérez Prado	
16 September	"Guaglione"	Pérez Prado	
23 September	"Saturday Night"	Whigfield	
30 September	"Saturday Night"	Whigfield	
7 October	"Saturday Night"	Whigfield	
14 October	"Saturday Night"	Whigfield	
21 October	"Love Me for a Reason"	Boyzone	
28 October	"Saturday Night"	Whigfield	
4 November	"Always"	Bon Jovi	
11 November	"Always"	Bon Jovi	
18 November	"Spanish Lady"	Dustin	
25 November	"Spanish Lady"	Dustin	
2 December	"Spanish Lady"	Dustin	
9 December	"Spanish Lady"	Dustin	
16 December	"Stay Another Day"	East 17	
23 December	"Stay Another Day"	East 17	
30 December	"Love Me For a Reason"	Boyzone	

== See also ==
- 1994 in music
- List of artists who reached number one in Ireland
