= Small X =

Moroccan rapper (born 1991)

- Born: Abdessamad Lamriq; March 1, 1991 (age 35); Safi, Morocco
- Genre: Hip hop
- Years active: 2004–present
- Label: Mass Appeal Records
- Formerly of: Shayfeen

Abdessamad Lamriq (born March 1, 1991), professionally known as Small X, is a Moroccan rapper and songwriter from Safi city. In 2006, alongside Chouaib Ribati, known by his stage name Shobee, co-founded the rap duo Shayfeen, which became a significant force in the Moroccan hip-hop scene. Small X later pursued a solo career, beginning in early 2021.

== Career ==
Shayfeen gained widespread recognition for their impactful music, with several tracks—such as Ntouma Malkoum, Sahbi, Ghayb9aw Jouj, Khchi F Wednek, Wach Kayn Maydar, Tcha Ra, and 7it 3arfinni—each surpassing one million views on YouTube and setting records on streaming platforms like Spotify and Deezer. Their work has left a lasting mark on the Moroccan rap scene.

In 2019, as part of the Naar collective, Small X collaborated with French rapper Dosseh on the track Kssiri. After Shayfeen's success, Small X embarked on a solo career in early 2021, releasing projects such as XXL and Phoenix, followed by a 7-track EP.

In March 2021, he was featured on ElGrandeToto's album Caméléon, contributing to the track Thezz.

In October 2023, Small X was among the 25 Middle Eastern and North African artists who collaborated on the single Rajieen, released to raise funds in response to the Gaza genocide amid the Gaza war.

In April 2025, Small announced that he signed a deal with New York-based record label Mass Appeal, making him as the first rapper from North Africa to join the influential label's roster.

== Discography ==
=== EPs/Mixtapes ===
- 2021: Phoenix
- 2023: X TAPE : CHROMOSOM
- 2025: NAFIDA

=== Collaborative EP/Mixtape (with Shobee) ===
- 2012: Energie (as Shayfeen)
- 2016: 07 (as Shayfeen)

=== Singles ===
- 2021: XXL
- 2021: Thezz feat. ElGrandeToto
- 2021: Ouh ouh feat. Inkonnu
- 2022: Price
- 2022: Manasich
- 2023: Lamouni feat. Wegz & Soufiane AZ
- 2024: Gaslight
- 2024: 7 (ح)

== See also ==
- Moroccan Hip Hop
- Dizzy DROS
- Tagne
