= Lush (company) =

British cosmetics company

Lush Ltd.

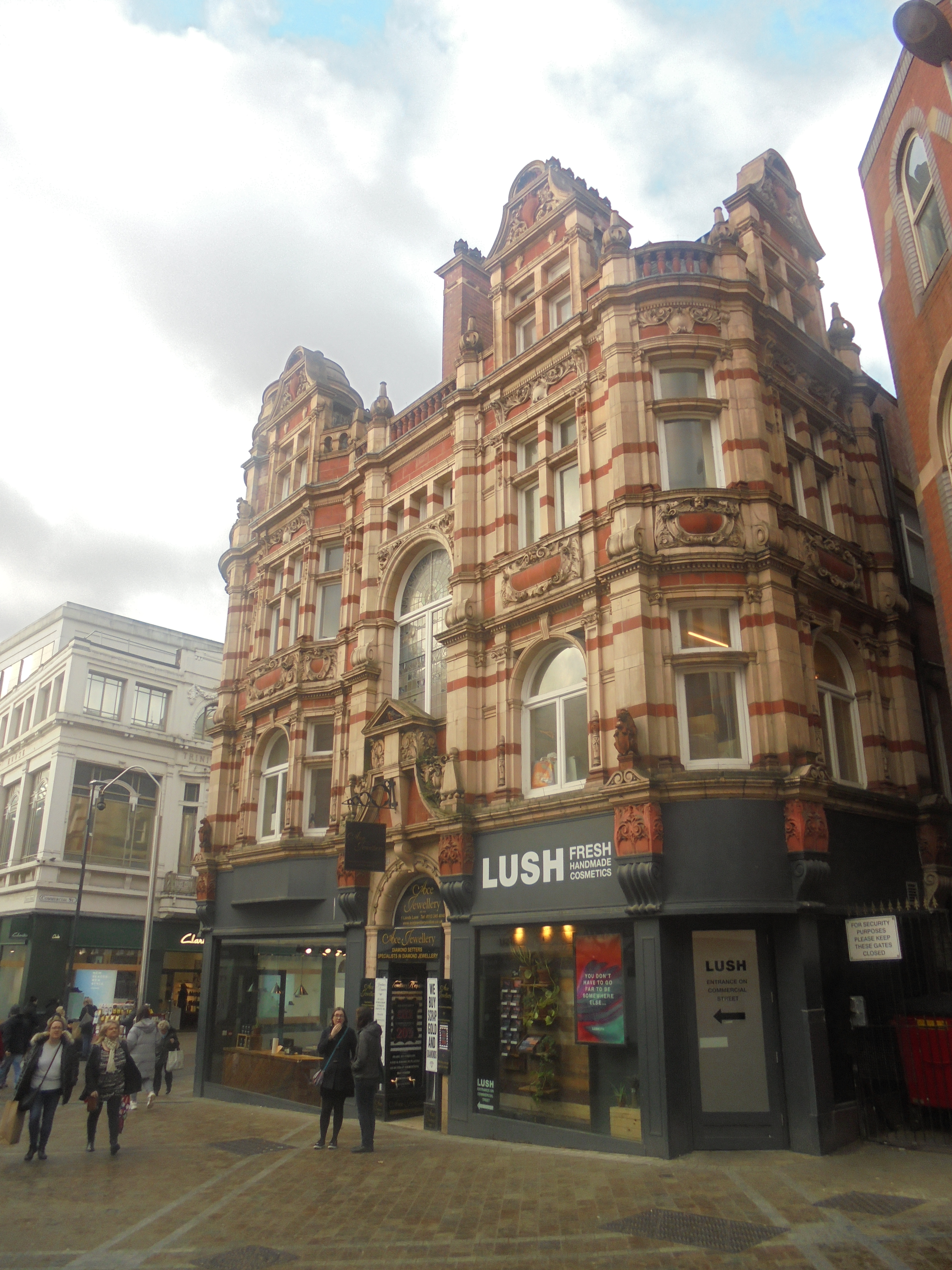
- Lush store in Leeds in February 2020
- Type: Private
- Industry: Cosmetics
- Founded: 17 June 1994; 32 years ago
- Founders: Mark and Mo Constantine, Liz Weir, Rowena Bird, Helen Ambrosen, Karl Bygrave and Paul Greeves
- Headquarters: Poole, England
- Number of locations: 886 stores (2024)
- Key people: Mark Constantine (CEO)
- Products: Skin care
- Revenue: £736.2 million (2025)
- Operating income: £6 million (2025)
- Number of employees: <13,000 employees (2025)
- Website: lush.com

Lush Ltd. is a British cosmetics retailer which is headquartered in Poole, England. It was founded in 1995 by trichologist Mark Constantine, his wife Mo Constantine and five other founders.

It produces and sells creams, soaps, shampoos, shower gels, lotions, moisturisers, scrubs, masks, and other cosmetics for the face and hair.

The organisation states it uses only vegetarian recipes, 95% of which are also vegan. The company operates stores in 51 countries globally, as well as production facilities located in the United Kingdom, Canada, Croatia, Germany, Japan, Australia, Poland, Hungary and Romania.

== History ==
=== Early years ===
The original Lush store in Poole

Co-founders Mark Constantine and Liz Weir met in the 1970s and subsequently set up a cosmetics business. Constantine began training as a hairdresser and, after completing his training, began working for Elizabeth Arden in London. Constantine began working at Marc Young's Beauty Salon in Poole, where he met Liz Weir, who was freelancing at the salon as a beauty therapist. Weir and Constantine started their own business selling natural hair and beauty products.

Constantine and Weir started supplying Anita Roddick's Body Shop when she launched her second shop in 1977. The pair would become the Body Shop's biggest supplier until, in the early 1990s, the retailer became uncomfortable with not owning the formulations of many of its products. The Body Shop bought Constantine and Weir out, paying them £6 million for the manufacturing rights to the products they had been supplying. Both co-founders signed a non-competition agreement, which was enforced until 1994.

The former Lush logo

=== Creation of Lush ===
In 1995, Constantine and Weir opened a cosmetics shop on High Street in Poole, creating cosmetics from freshly purchased fruits and vegetables. The company's name was chosen after a customer competition in the store's newsletter. Lush opened two new stores in Covent Garden and King's Road, London. Lush expanded into other countries. Just one year after opening 29 High Street, in 1996 Lush opened its first store outside of the UK… 1118 Denman Street, Vancouver, Canada, then with stores in Croatia and then Australia in 1997, Brazil in 1999 and Dublin, Ireland, in 2000.

"B Never Too Busy To Be Beautiful" was an experimental brand launched in 2003 by Lush. The first B Never store opened in 2003 and was located on Carnaby Street in London, before Lush expanded to opening 205 stores overseas. B Never closed its stores in 2009.

=== Recent history ===
In 2010, Lush launched Gorilla Perfume, a collaboration between perfumers Mark Constantine and his son Simon Constantine. In December 2010, Mark and his wife Mo Constantine were awarded the OBE in the New Year's Honours list, for services to the beauty industry. In 2014, Gorilla perfume opened its own standalone store in Islington, London. In December 2018, Lush launched its Naked skincare range, which includes solid facial oils and cleansers and a seaweed gel eye mask, and opened a number of Naked shops, in Manchester, Milan and Berlin. In 2019, Lush opened its biggest store in the world in Liverpool.

At the beginning of the COVID-19 pandemic, Lush offered the public free handwashing in all its stores, as a means to help slow the spread of the virus. However, due to the pandemic, Lush temporarily closed all North American stores on 16 March 2020, but continued to pay staff, with stores in Australia closing four days later and those in the UK closing on 21 March. Later in March, the company announced it was laying off staff in Canada due to the impact that the pandemic was having on its operation, facing a future with a "much smaller business".

In 2021, Lush removed its Facebook, Instagram, Snapchat and TikTok accounts citing negative mental health and body image effects caused by such services. In February 2022, following the 2022 Russian invasion of Ukraine, the company announced that it would be closing all 15 of its stores in Ukraine due to safety concerns.

In 2023, the company partnered with Nintendo and Illumination to make cosmetics based on The Super Mario Bros. Movie.

In 2025, Lush entered into a partnership with Download Festival, with Lush producing a “wash-pit” set which included a bath bomb, an "Ace Of Sprays" body spray and soap. However in 2026, Lush ended the partnership in response to the event organisers’ policy regarding which toilet facilities trans people can use.

== Business structure ==
Lush is a privately owned company with a small number of shares available on an invitation-only basis. The company operates in 49 countries, with approximately 20% of its stores located in the US as of 2017.

Many of the global operations outside the UK were founded via joint venture agreements between Lush and third parties. In 1996, a joint venture agreement was signed to expand the cosmetics operation to North America. This began by opening stores in Canada, and six years after the initial move into the North American market, Lush opened its first store in the United States. A similar arrangement saw the launch of Lush Australia in 1997, when the first store opened in the country.

The company follows a "no advertising policy", in which it does not spend money on TV campaigns or celebrity endorsements, and instead relies heavily on user-generated content. However, the company partnered with drag queens from RuPaul's Drag Race alumnae Kim Chi, Detox and Shea Couleé in the holiday season of 2018 to create photo campaigns for their new products. Products are also advertised through staff engaging in "random acts of kindness", where they are allowed to give away products to customers. Lush states that it does not have a target demographic, and that as a brand it is "trying to make [its] stores welcoming to all".

== Ingredients and ethics ==
Lush does not buy from companies that carry out, fund, or commission any animal testing. They test their products on human volunteers.

In the 1980s, the founders worked with Cruelty Free International (previously known as BUAV), with the aim of developing an ethical testing standard, specifically for cosmetic companies. The project led to the creation of cruelty-free standards still used today in the field of cosmetics.

Lush stipulates that they will not knowingly purchase from suppliers or supply chains that have been party to animal testing in any way, including the testing of raw materials on animals. This stance against animal testing has meant that there are some countries where Lush refuses to sell its products. An exception to this is REACH legislation, which was implemented by the European Union in 2007.

In late 2007, Lush introduced its first palm oil-free soap entitled "Greenwash", utilising a blend of sunflower oil, rapeseed oil, and coconut oil. Due to the soap's success, the company decided to switch both UK and overseas production from palm oil to this blend, significantly reducing the amount of palm oil the company purchased. However, many Lush products continue to contain palm oil, and palm-oil derivatives such as stearic acid, cetostearyl alcohol and sodium stearate. Since 2017, Lush has campaigned against the production and harvesting of palm oil, which is associated with orangutan habitat destruction in Sumatra, and since 2018 has purchased two plots of land bordering the Leuser Ecosystem on Sumatra to reforest.

Lush products are 100% vegetarian, and 95% of the products are also vegan. They often contain fruits and vegetables such as grapefruit juice, vanilla beans, aloe vera, avocado butter, rosemary oil, fresh papaya, and coconut. However, some products contain honey, and/or beeswax. Eggs used to be in products but were removed early 2019 and replaced by aquafaba, similarly lanolin was removed from all formulas in 2023. Parabens are used to preserve a number of the products.

Lush focuses on limited packaging for its product range, or package-free products.

The Environment Possibility Award conferred the "Award of Earth Defender" to Lush in 2020.

== Donations and campaigns ==
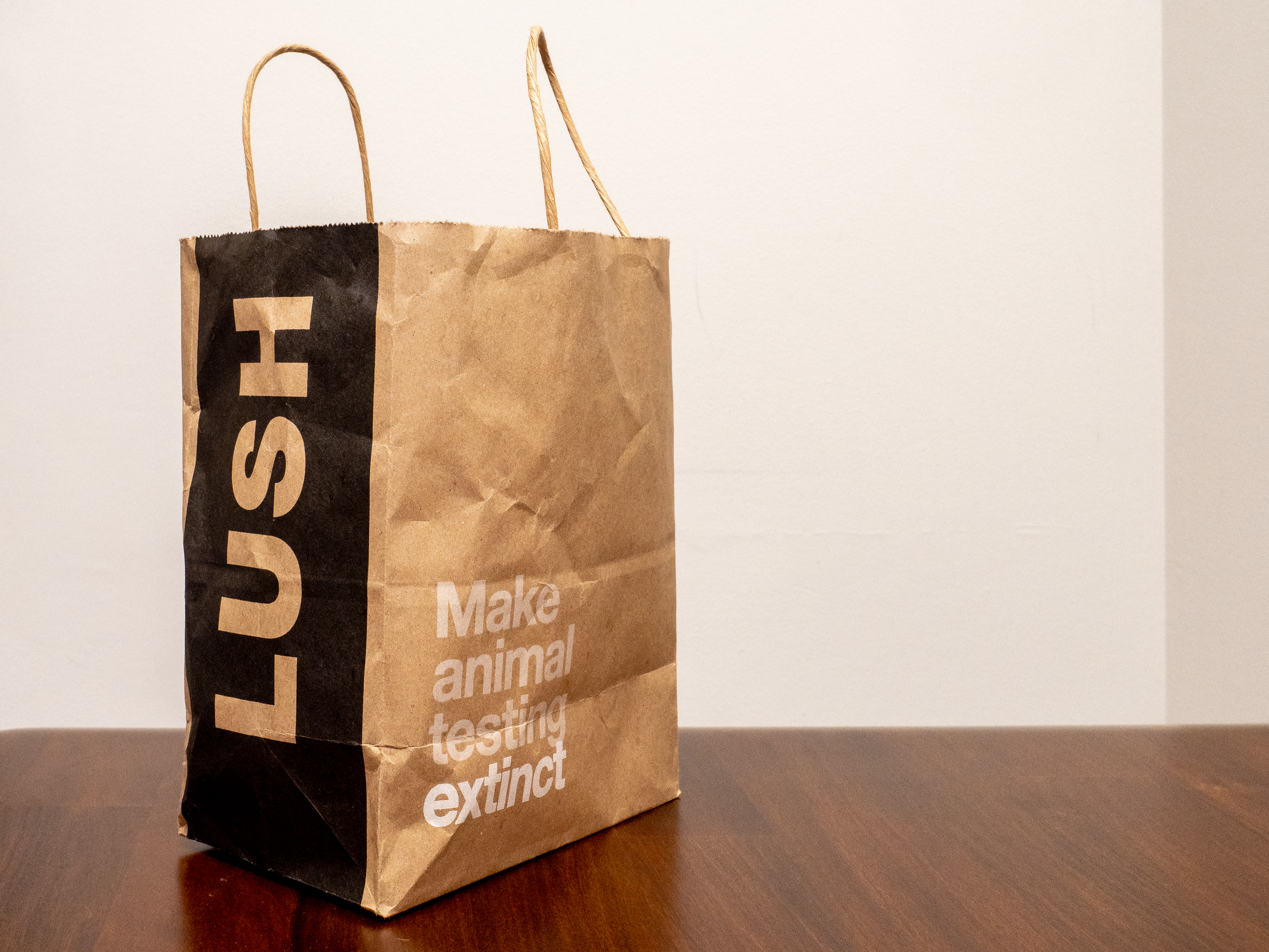
Lush packaging printed with "Make animal testing extinct"

In 2006, the REACH legislation was proposed by the European Union and contained legislation that Lush believed would increase animal testing. The cosmetics company wrote to its European customers and also ran an in-store marketing campaign, asking for postcards objecting to the legislation be sent to MEPs, a move which resulted in 80,000 Lush customers sending postcards. In December 2006, Lush protested outside the European Parliament in Strasbourg, by attempting to dump horse manure outside the building.

Lush is a supporter of direct action, animal rights operations including Sea Shepherd. Lush has been a supporter of anti-taxation-avoidance grouping UK Uncut and became the first multinational high-street retailer to secure a Fair Tax Mark in 2015.

In 2007, Lush started openly supporting campaigning groups by sending a dozen cheques for £1,000 each, including road protests groups such as Road Block and NoM1Widening, Hacan Clear Skies (anti-aviation group), and Dump the Dump (which is fighting against an incinerator). In 2011, Lush supported OneWorld's track Freedom for Palestine, which led to backlash from Israel advocacy groups, such as StandWithUs. Lush has since said it supports collaboration between the two nations especially in almond farming. In 2012, Lush had a performance artist endure ten hours of animal testing in the window of their Regent Street store window as part of their 'Fight Animal Testing' campaign.

Lush Cosmetics donated £3.8million to charities in 2014. In 2014, Lush supported the first Hen Harrier Day, with all its UK stores prominently highlighting the illegal persecution of hen harriers on upland grouse moors.

Following the 2019–20 Australian bushfire season, Lush launched a campaign titled All The Wild Things, with proceeds from the sales of the koala-shaped soap bars would go to relief efforts aimed for Australian wildlife affected by the bush fires.

In 2024, Lush announced that it had raised £100 million in charitable giving since 2007. It also announced that its charitable giving stream, Charity Pot would be discontinued. To follow, Lush announced the launch of Watermelon Slice soap, with profits going towards childhood mental health services in Palestine and Flame Fighters soap with profits raised to support communities in LA and the Amazon recover and protect from forest fires.

On 3 September 2025, Lush announced that they closed all its shops, website and factories in the UK and Australia for one day in solidarity with the people of Gaza, with the message "Stop starving Gaza" on the company's website.

=== #Spycops campaign ===
On 31 May 2018, Lush launched a campaign aimed to highlight previous abuses by undercover police officers in the UK. The company put up window displays in its stores with a mock-up of a police officer in and out of uniform alongside the tag-line "Paid to lie #Spycops". In some stores replica police tape was put on the shopfront windows with: "Police have crossed the line". The campaign attracted criticism on social media due to its "broad brush" approach which appeared to suggest that all police officers were liars and involved in a cover-up. Calum MacLeod, chair of the Police Federation and the Home Secretary, Sajid Javid, criticised the campaign. Lush responded that the campaign was "not an anti-state/anti-police campaign" and that they were aware "police forces of the UK are doing an increasingly difficult and dangerous job whilst having their funding slashed". They also stated that the campaign was "not about the real police work done by those front line officers who support the public every day – it is about a controversial branch of political undercover policing that ran for many years before being exposed." Lush suspended the window campaign "for the safety of our staff" on 8 June 2018, and resumed it on 13 June.

=== Boycott Israel Dublin shop window ===
After Hamas' October 7th attacks on Israel, a sign was placed in front of Lush's Dublin store saying "Boycott Israel". This caused a backlash with their call to boycott. Lush released the following statement: "Recently, one shop within the UK&I business briefly displayed a 'Boycott Israel' message in their window. It was an isolated occurrence that does not represent the Lush ethos that 'All Are Welcome. Always.' and was swiftly removed. Lush deplores all acts of violence and our wish is for peace and safety for all Israeli and Palestinian people. We support the upholding of international law and the human rights of all peoples."

== Lush Prize ==
In 2012, Lush created The Lush Prize, a global award and grant given to researchers that find solutions and alternatives to animal testing. Since its launch in 2012, the Lush Prize has funded £2.7 million. Past winners of the award have included PETA and a research team at the University of Cambridge. Recently the Lush Spring Prize was introduced, a biennial award with prize fund for projects that assist repairing the planet's damaged systems.

== Lavender Hill Mob incense ==
In 2015, Lush was criticised for insensitivity when it stocked a new product, Lavender Hill Mob – a brand of incense inspired by the 2011 London riots, featuring a graphic of a burning building. Lavender Hill had been targeted by looters and rioters. Lush stated that the product was "created to emphasise the importance of community".

== Labour relations ==
In July 2018, Lush Australia admitted owing more than 5,000 staff members up to $2 million in back pay. Lush Australia director Peta Granger said staff across the retail and manufacturing businesses have been underpaid since 2010 due to incorrect interpretations of the retail award. In 2020, The Guardian raised concerns about the labour conditions at the Lush kitchen in Sydney, Australia, due to the high rate of injury reported by factory staff. During the August 2020 resurgence of COVID-19 in Auckland, New Zealand, Lush employees were given 48 hours notice that they would not receive pay for the duration of level 3 restrictions when the stores were unable to open, prompting negotiations between Lush and First Union New Zealand. Lush were ineligible for the government wage subsidy for staff, as their revenues had not decreased enough during this period.

Beginning in 2020, Lush North America faced criticism for union busting and poor working conditions. In September 2020, Lush workers in Toronto, Canada launched a campaign to unionise. Employees complained about having their voices stifled by the company; facing retaliation for speaking out; having pay well below a living wage; and unfairly barring some employees from stability and benefits by abusing the company's seasonal contract policies. In response, Lush handed out anti-union leaflets, held captive audience meetings, and allegedly targeted union organisers. This is in contrast to the company's ethical buying policy, which states the importance of collective bargaining. Workers United Canada Council, the union representing Lush Workers, filed charges against the company in both the United States and Canada. The charges allege that the company's actions in response to the union organising drive, as well as retaliation against individual employees was unlawful.

== See also ==
- List of vegetarian and vegan companies
