= Rajieen =

2023 charity single

Single
- Language: Arabic
- Released: 31 October 2023
- Length: 8:20
- Label: Empire
- Composers: Nasir Al-Bashir; Marwan Moussa; Amr Shomali
- Lyricists: Afroto; A.L.A; Alyoung; Balti; Nasir Al-Bashir; Saif Bataineh; Dafencii; Amir Eid; Marwan Moussa; Nordo; Marwan Pablo; Wessam Qutob; Randar; Saif Shroof; Small X; Vortex; Dina El Wedidi
- Producers: Nasir Al-Bashir; Marwan Moussa; Amr Shomali

Music video
- "Rajieen" on YouTube

"Rajieen" (Palestinian Arabic: راجعين, transl. "[We] Will Return") is a 2023 charity single by 25 different artists from 11 Middle Eastern and North African countries. The song was released on 31 October 2023 to raise awareness of the suffering of the Palestinian population amid the Gaza war. All of the revenue generated by the song was donated to the Palestine Children's Relief Fund.

== Featured artists ==
The song features 25 artists, namely Saif Safadi, Dana Salah, Ghaliaa Chaker, Afroto, Nordo, Shroof, A5rass, Issam Alnajjar, Amir Eid, Balti, Wessam Qutob, Dina El Wedidi, Bataineh, Omar Rammal, Alyoung, Randar, Vortex, Small X, A.L.A, Fuad Gritli, Donia Wael, Zeyne, Marwan Moussa, Dafencii and Marwan Pablo.

== Themes ==
The song addresses a range of themes related to the broader Israeli–Palestinian conflict, such as the displacement of Palestinians, the West's support for Israel and the desire of Palestinians to return to their land. Furthermore, specific incidents are mentioned, such as the killing of Muhammad al-Durrah during the Second Intifada, and the Al-Ahli Arab Hospital explosion.

== Reception ==
Writing for the Institute for Palestine Studies, Asmahan Qarjouli wrote:

"Hopefully, 'Rajieen' would be the song that my generation and those who are much younger would listen to instead of inheriting 'The Arab Dream'. Return to Palestine is not a mere dream, it is destiny."

== Charts ==
Weekly chart performance for "Rajieen"
Chart (2023)	Peak position
Egypt (IFPI)	2
