= Khtek =

Moroccan rapper and activist

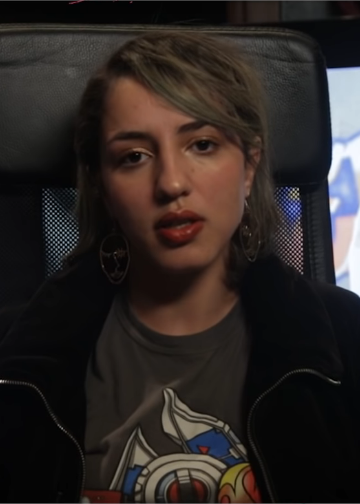
- Houda Abouz in 2020

Background information
- Born: Houda Abouz; 1996 (age 29–30); Khemisset
- Genres: Rap

Houda Abouz (Arabic: هدى عبوز) is a Moroccan rapper and women's rights advocate, known by her stage name Khtek (in Moroccan Arabic, meaning "your sister").

== Early life and education ==
Born in Khemisset in 1996, Abouz majored in film studies at the Abdelmalek Essaâdi University in Tétouan.

== Music career ==
Abouz chose her stage name "Khtek", which means "your sister" in Darija (Moroccan Arabic), as a deliberate challenge to the misogynistic language often found in rap. The term is commonly used by men as an insult, referencing a perceived point of vulnerability. By adopting the name, she aimed to reclaim the term and subvert its intended use. Although initially controversial, some radio hosts avoided saying it directly, the name garnered her significant public attention.

Abouz began freestyling and performing at festivals before recording any official tracks. Her popularity grew significantly after she started sharing her work on social media, leading to widespread recognition. In 2020, she collaborated with prominent Moroccan rappers, featuring on "Hors Série" alongside ElGrandeToto, Draganov, and Don Bigg, and on "Fratello" with Tagne and Stormy.

In February 2020, Abouz released her debut single "KickOff", which critiques a society she describes as denying equal opportunities to women.

Abouz's lyrics, primarily in Moroccan Arabic and occasionally incorporating French and English, often address societal themes. She identifies as a feminist, and has cited the 2011 pro-democracy protests in Morocco during the Arab Spring as an influence. While her music reflects everyday life and social realities, she has stated that it does not pursue a political agenda.

In December 2025, she launched the "X Tour", described as the first female-led rap tour in North Africa.

== Awards and recognitions ==
In November 2020, Khtek was announced as one of the BBC's 100 Women for 2020.

In 2024, Abouz won the "Top Arabic Hip-Hop Female Artist" award at the inaugural Billboard Arabia Music Awards.

== Personal life ==
Abouz has spoken publicly about her mental health, revealing that she has experienced depression since childhood and was diagnosed with bipolar disorder in 2016.

== Discography ==
=== Singles ===
- "KickOff" (2020)
- "5OTTA (32 Bar)" (2023)

=== As featured artist ===
- "Hors Série" (with ElGrandeToto, Draganov, and Don Bigg)
- "Fratello" (with Tagne and Stormy)
