= Stormy (rapper) =

Moroccan rapper and songwriter

- Also known as: Stormy
- Born: Yasser El Malih; 1996 or 1997 (age 29–30); Rabat, Morocco
- Occupations: Rapper, songwriter
- Years active: 2016-present

Yasser El Malih (born on February 14, 1997), known professionally as Stormy, is a Moroccan rapper and songwriter. Born into a musical family in Rabat, he was exposed to diverse genres, including metal and hip-hop, through his brothers during his formative years. Stormy is known for his singing and rapping versatility and often listed among the best Moroccan rappers.

The artist achieved critical and commercial breakthrough in 2024 with his debut solo album Iceberg. The lead single "Popo," a Brazilian funk-inspired rap track accompanied by a music video filmed in Rio de Janeiro, became a summer hit, amassing over 45 million YouTube views and 20 million streams as of March 2025, ranking among Morocco's most-watched music videos. For this commercial success, the song "Popo" was adopted as a jingle for Moroccan telecommunications company Inwi, featuring a branded lyrical revision and cameo appearance by footballer Achraf Hakimi.

== Early life ==
Stormy grew up with two older brothers, both of whom first exposed him to music. His eldest brother exposed him to metal bands like Slipknot and Slayer, while his middle brother—an aspiring rapper—shared Moroccan hip-hop and American icons like Eminem and 50 Cent.

Initially torn between metal and rap, Stormy ultimately chose hip-hop, drawn to the lyrical mastery of Jay-Z and Nas. Though his limited English initially hindered comprehension, he connected with their artistic confidence and rhythmic flow. As his language skills improved, he gained deeper appreciation for their wordplay—an element that would later define his own approach to music.

== Career ==
Stormy first gained significant attention in 2020 with a series of successful singles: "Fratello" (featuring Khtek and Tagne), "777", "Africain", and "Si tu savais" (featuring Anys). His career reached new heights in 2021 through the collaborative album Jackpot with Tagne, which significantly expanded his fan base.

Other standout tracks like "Maradona" and "Nikey" (featuring Dizzy DROS) each surpassed 10 million streams, further cementing the album's success. Demonstrating his creative versatility, Stormy unexpectedly released an EP titled OMEGA in January 2025 without prior promotion, which was met with positive reception from both fans and critics.

== Musical style ==
Stormy has cultivated a distinctive musical style that blends sharp lyricism with melodic elements, often incorporating autotune. His clever wordplay and quotable bars have permeated Moroccan pop culture, with lines from his songs becoming part of everyday vernacular. He usually raps in Moroccan Arabic and French. Stormy is praised for his versatility, with his music spanning a range of genres including afrobeat, Brazilian funk, trap, and drill.

While contemporaries often prioritize melodic trends, Stormy champions rap’s foundational emphasis on lyricism. "Lyrics give music longevity," he asserts, citing how Tupac and Biggie’s work remains culturally resonant compared to fleeting 2010s hits. This conviction stems from his teenage years of uploading YouTube freestyles and meticulously refining his craft based on audience feedback.

== Discography ==
Studio albums

- Iceberg (2024)

Collaborative albums

- Jackpot (with Tagne) (2021)

EPs/Mixtapes

- Omega (2025)

== See also ==
- Moroccan Hip-Hop
- ElGrandeToto
- Don Bigg
- 7liwa
