= Marwan Moussa =

Egyptian rapper and music producer (born 1995)

Marwan Moussa مروان موسى
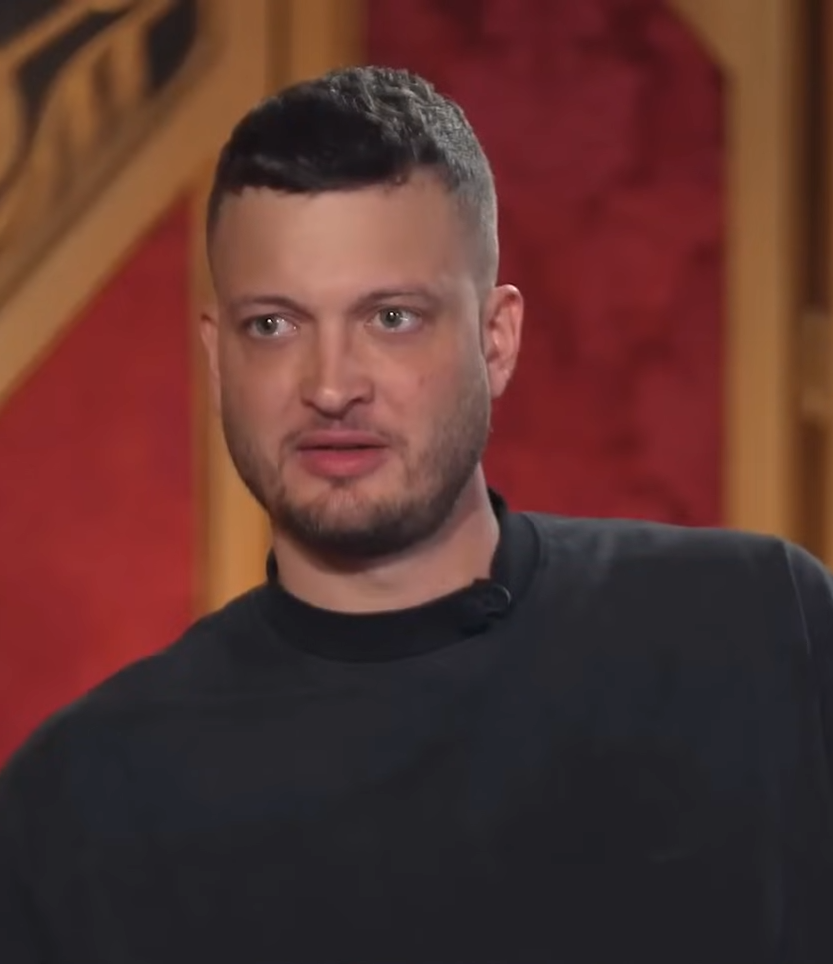

Background information
- Also known as: Maro, Mario
- Born: Marwan Mohamed Ali Moussa; January 10, 1995 (age 31); Ismailia, Egypt
- Genres: Egyptian hip-hop; Egyptian Arabic Rap; Trap; Shaabi
- Years active: 2016–present
- Labels: Universal Arabic Music; The Basement Records; Ra2s Mal
- Member of: Beatroot Records
- Formerly of: Ra2s Mal

Marwan Mohamed Ali Moussa (Arabic: مروان موسى, born 10 January 1995), better known as Marwan Moussa, is an Egyptian rapper and music producer. One of the most prominent figures in the Egyptian hip-hop scene, Moussa won 2 All Africa Music Awards (AFRIMA) awards: Best African Rapper/Lyricist and Best Duo or Group in African Hip Hop in 2022.

== Early life and education ==
Marwan Moussa was born in Ismailia to an Egyptian father and a German mother. He studied cinema and directing at The American University of Rome in Italy for four years before pursuing music studies. In late 2016, he began studying music production and sound engineering in Los Angeles.

== Career ==
Marwan began his musical career in 2016, initially focusing on singing and songwriting. His first song, "Hayla," was released that same year. In 2017, he released his debut album "Bel Monasba".

He received two awards at the All Africa Music Awards (AFRIMA) in Dakar, Senegal, Best African Rapper/Lyricist and Best Duo or Group in African Hip Hop.

In August 2022, Marwan participated in an African fusion remix of the hit song "Pasoori" by Ali Sethi on Coke Studio Africa, which featured a blend of Nigerian Afrobeats, Egyptian rap, and Pakistani vocals.

Spotify data from 2023 showed Marwan Moussa as the third most streamed Arabic hip-hop artist of all time across the Middle East and North Africa (MENA) region.

In 2023, he was featured as a co-writer and performer in the single "Rajieen", a collaboration with 24 artists from 11 Middle Eastern and North African countries. The song was created to raise awareness of the Palestinian struggle amid the 2023 Gaza war.

== Discography ==
=== Albums ===
- 2017 – Bel Monasba
- 2021 – Florida
- 2023 – Import//Export
- 2025 – AL RAGOL ALZY FQAD QLBO (The Man Who Lost His Heart)
- 2025 - MATADOR

=== Selected singles ===
Notable Singles
Year	Title	Notes	Ref
2022	"Batal 3alam"	Solo single	
2023	"Rajieen"	Featured artist	

== Awards ==
Marwan Moussa has received several awards during his career, including:

- Best African Rapper/Lyricist – AFRIMA 2022
- Best Duo or Group in African Hip Hop – AFRIMA 2022
