= Zeyne (singer) =

Palestinian-Jordanian singer-songwriter (born 1997)

Zeyne زين
- Born: Zein Izzat Sajdi; 15 December 1997 (age 28); Amman, Jordan
- Genres: Arabic; jazz; pop; R&B; soul
- Occupations: Singer; songwriter; musician; producer
- Instruments: Vocals; piano
- Years active: 2021–present
- Labels: Keife Records; Scarab Records; MDLBEAST Records
- Website: zeyne.co

Zein Izzat Sajdi (Arabic: زين عزت ساجدي; born 15 December 1997), known as Zeyne, is a Palestinian-Jordanian singer, songwriter, musician and producer.

== Early life and education ==
Sajdi was born and raised in Amman, Jordan, the youngest child in a Palestinian-Jordanian family (her grandparents hailing from Nablus) with a passion for music and dance – her father is a collector of music records, her mother is an amateur singer who managed a dabke troupe for over twenty years, and her oldest sister Lina is a pianist. She joined a dabke group at the age of five, started taking piano lessons from a Russian teacher at six, and was introduced to classical singing a few years later by a Japanese teacher.

She pursued a degree in Media Communications and Sociology at the University of Sussex in Brighton and Hove.

== Career ==
After graduating in 2020, Sajdi briefly returned to Amman in order to prepare to move to London, where she had accepted a job offer at a public relations firm. Due to the COVID-19 pandemic, however, she was unable to travel outside the country and started an Instagram account where she posted song covers. The page garnered significant following in a short time and, after joining the Jordanian Female Artist Collective, Sajdi was invited to perform at the Amman Jazz Festival. She became acquainted with fellow musician Hana Malhas and producer Nasir Al Bashir, and the founders of Keife Records offered her a record deal shortly after.

Encouraged by Al Bashir, she began composing her own songs. Her debut single "Minni Ana", featuring mixed English and Arabic lyrics, was released in March 2021, shortly followed by "Nostalgia". After releasing her single "Atoul", Sajdi collaborated with Palestinian artist Saint Levant on the July 2022 single "Balak". Sajdi has gone on to write music for other artists, including Elyanna and Massari and, most importantly, several songs contained in Issam Alnajjar's 2021 debut album Baree? and 2023 debut EP Waray. In the same period, she released the single "Ana Wein", co-written with Al Bashir and Lina Makoul.

In October 2023, in response to the Gaza genocide amid the Gaza war, 25 Middle Eastern and North African artists, including Sajdi, collaborated on the charity single "Rajieen". Sajdi then released the love song "Ma Bansak" in February 2024 before writing "Bali", released in June 2024 and recounting her mental state during the humanitarian crisis in Gaza.

In November 2024, Sajdi released the double single "7arrir 3aqlak / Asli Ana", with the latter track being an R&B song set to the rhythm of traditional Levantine folk dance dabke; the accompanying music video features Sajdi herself dancing alongside professional dabke dancers.

In July 2025, Sajdi released "Hilwa", the lead single from her upcoming debut album Awda. The song is an homage to her mother and grandmother, and Palestinian women in general. The album, preceded by a second single, was released in mid-October 2025, and features collaborations with Saint Levant and Bayou as well as her 2024 song "7arrir 3aqlak / Asli Ana".

Zeyne is set to embark on a European tour, named AWDA Tour, in September 2026. Originally planned for March–April 2026, the tour was postponed following the outbreak of the war on Iran.

== Artistry ==
Sajdi's musical style has been described as "eclectic", incorporating elements of Arabic music, jazz (including South African jazz), R&B, soul, hip hop and Albanian folk music as well as drawing inspiration from the work of artists like Ziad Rahbani, Elias Rahbani, Fairuz, Lauryn Hill, H.E.R., Destiny's Child, Billie Eilish, Rosalía, Manal, Angèle and Dua Lipa, in addition to Palestinian poet Mahmoud Darwish.

As of July 2025, Sajdi has totalled over 51 million streams across platforms.

== Discography ==
=== Albums ===
- Awda – عودة – 2025

=== EPs ===
- Awda – عودة (Live Studio Sessions) – 2026

=== Singles ===
List of charted songs, with selected chart positions, showing year released and album name
Title	Year	Peak chart positions					Album or EP
Title	Year	ARB	EGY	GRE	Indie Arab	LBN	Album or EP
"Minni Ana"	2021	—	—	—	—	—	Non-album singles
"Yamma Mweil il Hawa"	2021	—	—	—	—	—	Non-album singles
"Nostalgia"	2021	—	—	—	—	—	Non-album singles
"Bala Wa Shi"	2021	—	—	—	—	—	Non-album singles
"Atoul"	2022	—	—	—	—	—	Non-album singles
"Atoul (Gruzzman Remix)"	2022	—	—	—	—	—	Non-album singles
"Atoul (AudiobySamuel Remix)"	2022	—	—	—	—	—	Non-album singles
"Balak" (featuring Saint Levant)	2022	87	—	—	18	24	Non-album singles
"Ana Wein"	2023	—	—	—	—	—	Non-album singles
"Mish Asfeh"	2023	—	—	—	—	—	Non-album singles
"Wala Forsa"	2023	—	—	—	—	—	Non-album singles
"Rajieen" (featuring various)	2023	—	2	—	—	—	Non-album singles
"Ma Bansak"	2024	—	—	—	—	—	Non-album singles
"Ma Bansak – A Colors Show"	2024	—	—	—	—	—	Non-album singles
"Bali"	2024	—	—	—	—	—	Awda
"Goodbye"	2024	—	—	—	—	—	Non-album singles
"Lonely Nights"	2024	—	—	—	—	—	Non-album singles
"Mesh Haseebek" (Bayou ft. Zeyne)	2024	—	—	—	18	—	Non-album singles
"7arrir 3aqlak"	2024	—	—	—	—	—	Awda
"Asli Ana"	2024	—	—	—	19	26	Awda
"Rajawi Falasteeni (Ma Nisma7 Feek Ya Gaza)"	2024	—	—	—	—	—	Non-album single
"Hilwa"	2025	—	—	—	—	—	Awda
"Arrib Minni"	2025	—	—	—	—	—	Awda
"Kollo Lena"	2025	—	—	—	—	—	Awda
"A'ti" (with Marina Satti)	2026	—	—	8	—	—	Non-album singles
"Kentili" (with Manal)	2026	—	—	—	—	—	Non-album singles
"—" denotes a recording that did not chart or was not released in that territory.
