= Beth Porch =

- Birth name: Elizabeth Grace Porch
- Born: 13 November 1994 (age 30); Dawlish, Devon
- Genres: Pop
- Occupation(s): Singer, songwriter, paediatric nurse
- Years active: 2020–present

Beth Porch (born 13 November 1994) is an English pop singer, who rose to fame after appearing on the fourteenth series of Britain's Got Talent. She performed an original song for her audition, "You Taught Me What Love Is", which was subsequently released as a single to raise money for the NHS during the COVID-19 pandemic. Porch is also a children's nurse at Great Ormond Street Hospital. Through her semi final performance, she sang another original song called 'everyday heroes', in October 2020. After she got eliminated from BGT, she continued to work in children's hospitals throughout the pandemic.

Her performance of "You Taught Me What Love Is" on Britain's Got Talent was filmed in January but aired during the COVID-19 pandemic, and Porch revealed that she had contracted the disease herself.

Her paternal grandfather was doctor and antarctic explorer Antony G Davies, the namesake of Davies Top.
