= Sarah Phillips (singer) =

Sarah Phillips (born 4 August 1993) is an English singer. She recorded a cover of Paolo Nutini's "Autumn", using a mobile phone, as a tribute to her mother, who died after a four-year battle with cancer. Phillips' cover of the track was put onto YouTube, and garnered a UK release. The track reached No. 49 in the UK Singles Chart.

Phillips has also recorded "Blue Chair", a song she wrote herself, as well as various other cover versions of songs for an EP to raise money for the charity established in memory of her mother.
