= You Taught Me What Love Is =

2020 song by Beth Porch

Single by Beth Porch
- Released: 18 April 2020
- Genre: pop
- Length: 3:28
- Songwriter: Beth Porch

"You Taught Me What Love Is" is a song by English singer-songwriter Beth Porch, released after her performance on Britain's Got Talent which aired on 18 April 2020.

The song was at number four on the Official Chart First Look the following day, but ultimately the song entered the UK Singles Chart at number 25, spending a single week in the top 40.

== Background ==
Porch is a children's nurse at Great Ormond Street Hospital and the song was inspired by the families and patients she works with.

The performance on the fourteenth series of Britain's Got Talent was filmed in January 2020 but aired during the COVID-19 pandemic, and Porch revealed that she had contracted the disease herself.

Proceeds from the single were shared between NHS Charities Together and Great Ormond Street Hospital for Children NHS Foundation Trust.

== Charts ==
Chart (2020)	Peak position
UK Singles (OCC)	25
