= Tagne =

Moroocan rapper (born 1997)

- Also known as: Tagne
- Born: Ilies Tagne; July 13, 1997 (age 29); Casablanca, Morocco
- Genres: Rap . Afro
- Years active: 2010–present

Ilies Tagne (Arabic: إلياس طاني, born in July 13, 1997), known mononymously as Tagne, is a Moroccan rapper of Cameroonian descent. Tagne began his rap career as a teenager, 1/2 of the duo Xacto with his partner Madd. The pair received early support from Shayfeen through WA DRARI, a collective that played a key role in nurturing their talent. He is often listed among Morocco's best and most streamed rappers.

After releasing their Ep Extase (2016) and several other projects under the Xacto name, the duo eventually parted ways. Tagne rose to prominence during the COVID-19 pandemic with the release of his debut solo album, Moroccan Dream (2020). He is amongst the most streamed Moroccan rappers.

== Biography ==
Tagne was born in 1997 in the Kedima neighborhood of the old medina in Casablanca. His father is a migrant from Cameroon, while his mother is Moroccan. He developed an interest in rap music in 2010, drawing inspiration from American and French rap. In 2020, Tagne made history as the first Moroccan rapper to perform in Darija, the Moroccan dialect, on SkyRock's PlanèteRap. His unique style and bilingual background have contributed to his distinctive approach to the genre.

Tagne expressed that some of his inspirations are rai stars like Cheb Bilal and Cheb Hasni as well as afro stars like Burna Boy and Wizkid.

== Discography ==
=== Studio albums ===
- Moroccan Dream (2020)
- Lmektoub (2023)

=== Collaborative albums ===
- Jackpot (with Stormy) (2021)

=== Singles ===
- 2020: Thellaw
- 2020: ROUTINE
- 2020: KIKI
- 2020: FLOUKA
- 2020: Hustler
- 2020: Fratello (with Stormy and Khtek)
- 2021: Omri Ana
- 2021: Layli
- 2021: Sebyan
- 2021: Youm Wara Youm
- 2021: Tchin Tchin
- 2021: Ok ok
- 2021: J'en ai marre
- 2021: Nadi Canadi
- 2022: Ma colombe (Moroccan Remix) de Nej' (SOS (Chapitre 2))
- 2022: Maak (duo with Manal)
