= Safe Ireland =

Safe Ireland (also styled as safeireland) is an Irish organisation dedicated to preventing and combatting domestic violence and abuse and running a Women's Refuge (MWSS).

By its own report, the vast majority of its member services work specifically with female and underage victims, not with adult male victims.

Its self-reported 2021 and 2022 funding were 1,892,546 EUR and 1,689,303 EUR, respectively. Its main funding source is the governmental Child and Family Agency.

As of November 2023, it reports having 37 member organisations spread out over Ireland.

In 2016, it supported an UN Women HeForShe event at which Hozier performed his song Cherry Wine.
