= Ghaliaa Chaker =

Syrian musical artist

Ghaliaa Chaker غالية شاكر
- Also known as: Ghaliaa
- Born: 1998 (age 26–27); Damascus, Syria
- Origin: Al Ain, United Arab Emirates
- Genres: R&B; hip hop; electropop; indie; jazz; khaliji
- Occupations: Singer; songwriter; composer; record player
- Website: ghaliaaofficial.com

Ghaliaa Chaker (Arabic: غالية شاكر; born 1998), often known mononymously as Ghaliaa, is a Syrian singer, songwriter, composer, record player, and multi-instrumental artist.

Chaker has released two albums titled Amygdala and Kel Yli 9ar, and her discography includes more than thirty songs. Some of her most famous songs include "3abali", "Nas", "Cause You Trouble", "Don't You Dare", "Praying", and "Go Away".

== Early life and education ==
Chaker was born in Damascus in 1998. Her family decided to move from Damascus to the United Arab Emirates when she was a year old. She grew up in Al Ain, with her parents and sister. She received her degree from the Al Ain campus of Abu Dhabi University.

== Career ==
Chaker began her career at the age of 16 by composing and writing lyrics. She is inspired by her life experiences and performs in numerous languages. Chaker make her debut in August 2018 with the R&B rocker "Why?", followed by "Kel El Kalam". "Why?" was ranked one of the Top 10 Releases of 2018 by Apple Music. She released two more singles in 2018, "Praying/Je Prie", a glacial ode to forgiveness and redemption sung in English and French, and the radio-friendly Arabic power-ballad "Shou Bidak". A music video was later released for the song "Praying", shot on the Jebel Hafeet.

Chaker was featured in the Emirates Woman's Balcony Sessions at the Apple Store, Dubai Mall, in December 2018. In 2020, Chaker performed in UAE's online music festival, The Beat DXB Lockdown, which featured 33 artists performing over nine hours. They performed a ten-minute set from home, using the social media platform Instagram.

In October 2023, Chaker was among the 25 Middle Eastern and North African artists who collaborated on the single "Rajieen", released to raise funds in response to the Gaza genocide amid the Gaza war.
