= Freedom for Palestine =

2011 single by OneWorld

"Freedom for Palestine" is a song by OneWorld, a collective of musicians, artists, campaign groups and charities working together to "raise awareness of the Israeli occupation of Palestine and the resulting poverty and other human rights abuses." The song, released on 3 July 2011, is a compilation number, similar to "Free Nelson Mandela" or "Feed the World". Its lyrics mention "catastrophes, refugees, crimes against humanity, prison camps, occupation, human rights and justice."

Artists on the video include Maxi Jazz (Faithless), Dave Randall (Slovo/Faithless), LSK, the Durban Gospel Choir, members of the London Community Gospel Choir, Jamie Catto (1 Giant Leap) and musicians from around the world. Proceeds from the song go to the charity War on Want for projects in Palestine.

The song went in at number 10 in the UK indie charts and entered the UK Singles Chart on 10 July 2011 at number 79.

== Background ==
According to the project website: "Palestine is in crisis. Today Palestinians face daily human rights abuse and live in crushing poverty in refugee camps and under Israeli Occupation. In response to this injustice, a group of international musicians are releasing the song Freedom for Palestine by OneWorld."

According to the song's official website, it is supported by War on Want, A. M. Qattan Foundation, Palestine Solidarity Campaign, Jews for Justice for Palestinians, A Just Peace for Palestine, Friends of al-Aqsa, Israeli Committee Against House Demolitions UK, Stop the War Coalition and Trust Greenbelt.

== Reception ==
Archbishop Desmond Tutu, musician Roger Waters, Bristol based trip hop duo Massive Attack, British actress Julie Christie, UK Hip-hop artist Lowkey, singer-songwriter Sami Yusuf, musician and activist Billy Bragg, film director Ken Loach, writer and dub poet Benjamin Zephaniah, comedian Mark Thomas, and award winning author and civil rights activist Alice Walker all endorsed the song. UK natural cosmetics manufacturer and retailer Lush also publicly supported the song.

An Early Day Motion was proposed in the British Parliament by Liberal Democrat MP Bob Russell, seconded by Peter Bottomley, commending Tutu for his promotion of the song, and calling on the "Government to join forces with governments around the world to put pressure on Israel to honour UN resolutions." In the United States, Glenn Beck was critical, calling it "evil" and "pure propaganda" on his Fox News television show.

== Coldplay ==
On 1 June 2011, UK rock band Coldplay posted on their Facebook page "Some of our friends are involved in OneWorld's new 'Freedom for Palestine' single" with a link to the website and the video clip, causing controversy. Over 6,000 Facebook users quickly used the "Like" feature, and the posting soon received 12,000 comments. Coldplay's link to the video drew attention from many fans, both agreeing and disagreeing with the message of the song. On 6 June reports indicated that Coldplay had removed the link to the song from their Facebook wall with no explanation. According to Frank Barat of OneWorld, the link was not removed by Coldplay, but by Facebook after thousands of people reported it as abusive."
