= Issam Alnajjar =

Palestinian-Jordanian musical artist (born 2003)

Issam Alnajjar عصام النجار
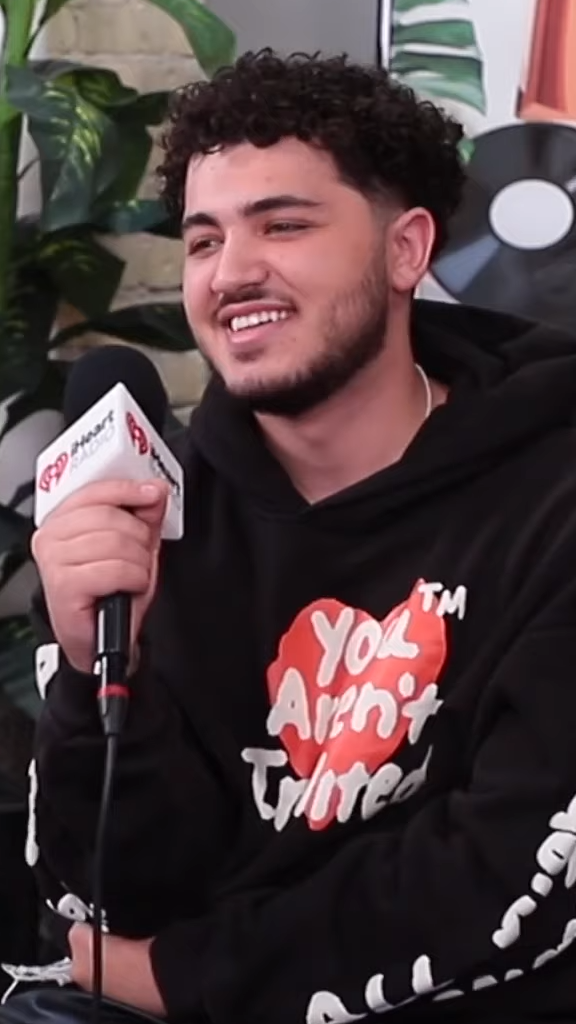
- Alnajjar in 2023

Background information
- Born: 12 May 2003 (age 23); Amman, Jordan
- Genre: Pop
- Occupations: Singer; guitarist; actor
- Instrument: Vocals
- Years active: 2020–present
- Label: Universal Arabic Music
- Website: www.issamalnajjar.com

Issam Alnajjar (Arabic: عصام النجار; born 12 May 2003) is a Palestinian-Jordanian musician. He is most notable for his debut single "Hadal Ahbek", which went viral on TikTok.

He was the first artist to sign with Universal Arabic Music. His debut studio album, Baree?, was released in 2021. An extended play, Waray, was released in 2023.

== Early life ==
Issam Alnajjar was born on 12 May 2003 in Amman, Jordan to Palestinian parents. His family has been living in Jordan for more than eighteen years. His father grew up in Kuwait and his mother grew up in Lebanon.

== Career ==
=== 2020–2021: TikTok breakthrough, Universal Arabic Music and Baree? ===
Issam Alnajjar first began his musical career by posting videos on his Instagram page and YouTube channel of him singing cover songs of popular music. On 29 June 2020, Alnajjar released a single on Spotify titled "On of a Kind".

On 23 September 2020, Alnajjar released "Hadal Ahbek". Popular influencers David Dobrik, Addison Rae, and Caroline Carr all used Alnajjar's audio which further boost popularity to the original song. The hashtag #hadal_ahbek came up with more than 300 million results.

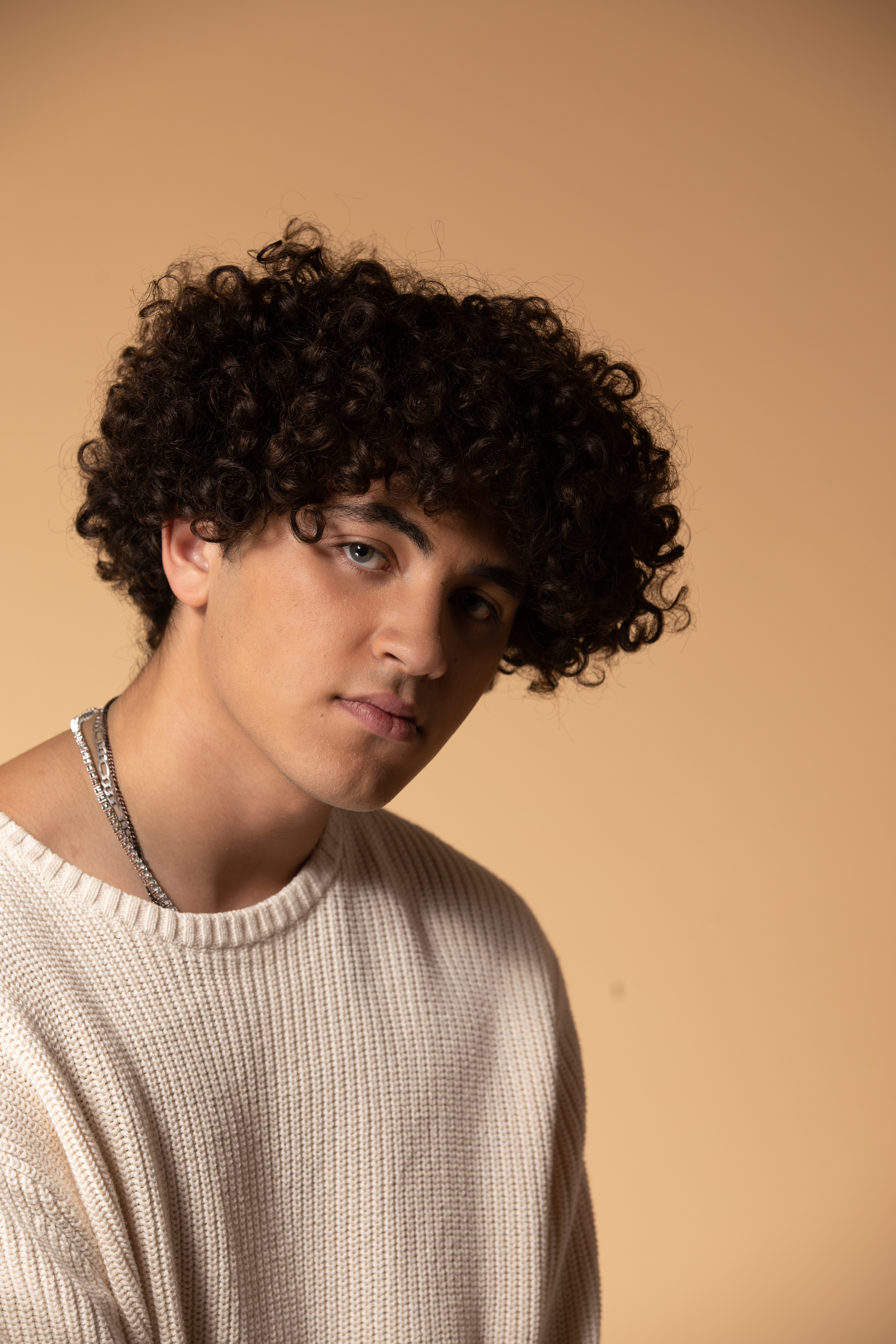
Issam Alnajjar in August 2021

On 6 April 2021, Alnajjar became the first artist to be signed to Universal Arabic Music, a division of Universal Music Group. With the signing of the label, Alnajjar was chosen by The Weekend's manager Wassim Slaiby. On 9 April, Alnajjar teamed up with Spotify to release the first Arabic song in the "RADAR" series with the release of "Turning Me Up." This single was an English remix and was produced by Loud Luxury and featured vocals from Ali Gatie. As part of promotion for the single, Alnajjar was featured on the Times Square billboard in New York City.

On 9 July, Alnajjar released "Mn Gheirik Enti". On 17 September, Alnajjar released "Hada Ghareeb" featuring Elyanna. On 27 September, Alnajjar released a Spanish remix of "Hadal Ahbek" titled "Si Tú Vuelas," which featured Spanish vocals from Danna Paola and was produced by Alok.

On 1 October, Alnajjar's debut studio album, Baree?, was released on digital download and streaming.

=== 2022–present: Hadal Ahbek Tour, Waray and 2025 resurface ===
On 3 May, Alnajjar was the opening act at the Maroon 5 tour in Dubai.

On 6 October, Alnajjar featured on the Arabic remix of Alok and Alan Walker's "Headlights" which also featured KIDDO. On 2 December, Alnajjar released "Ansaki". On 28 April 2023, Alnajjar released "TMO", which featured Mohamed Ramadan and featured French vocals from Gims. On 14 July, Alnajjar released his first extended play, Waray.

On 31 October 2023, Alnajjar was featured alongside 24 other artists from the Middle East and North Africa on the charity single "Rajieen", which was released in aim to raise money for the Palestine Children's Relief Fund due to the ongoing Gaza war.

On July of 2025, Issam Alnajjar's popular song "Hadal Ahbek" Blew up on TikTok for a second time, because of a misheard lyric which people translated to "Obama have d-" Instead of responding with hatred, Issam embraced this meme as you can see in his TikTok bio.

== Discography ==
=== Studio albums ===
Title	Details
Baree?	Released: 1 October 2021; Label: Universal Arabic Music, Republic; Formats: Digital download, streaming
Nights in Cairo	Released: 19 June 2026; Label: SALXO, Virgin Music Group; Formats: Digital download, streaming

=== Extended plays ===
Title	Details
Waray	Released: 14 July 2023; Label: Universal Arabic Music, Republic; Formats: Digital download, streaming

=== Singles ===
==== As lead artist ====
Title	Year	Peak chart positions			Certifications	Album or EP
Title	Year	CAN	LBN	POL	Certifications	Album or EP
"Hadal Ahbek"	2020	—	—	45	ZPAV: Gold	Baree?
"Turning Me Up (Hadal Ahbek)" (with Loud Luxury and Ali Gatie)	2021	47	10	—	MC: Gold	Baree?
"Mn Gheirik Enti"	2021	—	4	—		Baree?
"Hada Ghareeb" (featuring Elyanna)	2021	—	1	—		Baree?
"Si Tú Vuelas" (with Alok and Danna Paola)	2021	—	—	—		Baree?
"Ansaki"	2022	—	2	—		Waray
"TMO" (featuring Mohamed Ramadan and Gims)	2023	—	1	—		Waray
"Waray" (with R3hab featuring Manal)	2023	—	1	—		Waray
"Ya Leil"	2024	—	3	—		Nights in Cairo
"Zaffeh"	2025	—	—	—		Nights in Cairo
"Hayati"	2025	—	—	—		Nights in Cairo
"Poisoned"	2026	—	—	—		Nights in Cairo
"—" denotes a recording that did not chart or was not released in that territory.

==== As featured artist ====
Title	Year	Album
"Headlights" (Alok and Alan Walker featuring Kiddo and Issam Alnajjar)	2022	Non-album singles

==== Charity singles ====
List of charity songs, with selected chart positions, showing year released and album name
Title	Year	Peak chart positions	Album or EP	Notes
Title	Year	EGY	Album or EP	Notes
"Rajieen"	2023	2	Non-album single	Produced by Palestinian artists and released to raise money for the Palestine Children's Relief Fund.

=== Other charted songs ===
Title	Year	Peak chart positions	Album
Title	Year	LBN	Album
"Taawadt Aleiki"	2022	6	Baree?

=== Music videos ===
Title	Year	Director(s)	Ref.
As lead artist
"Hadal Ahbek"	2021	Alex Loucas	
"Turning Me Up" (with Loud Luxury and Ali Gatie)	2021	Danielle Okon	
"Mn Gheirik Enti"	2021	Omar Rammal	
"Hada Ghareeb" (featuring Elyanna)	2021	John Prímo	
"Si Tú Vuelas" (with Alok and Danna Paola)	2021	Edgar Esteves	
"Taawadt Aleiki"	2022	John Prímo	
"Ansaki"	2022	John Prímo	
"TMO" (featuring Mohamed Ramadan and Gims)	2023	John Prímo	
"Waray" (with R3hab featuring Manal)	2023	Unknown	
"Ya Leil"	2024	Spaced Visuals	
"Zaffeh / زفّة"	2025	Abanoub Ramsis	
As featured artist	2025		
"Rajieen" (with various artists)	2023	Omar Donga	

== Awards and nominations ==
Year	Award	Category	Receipt	Result	Ref.
2022	Nickelodeon Kids' Choice Awards	Favourite Star (Arabia)	Himself	Nominated	
2023	Nickelodeon Kids' Choice Awards Abu Dhabi	Favourite Artist	Himself	Nominated	
