= Watch Your House for Ireland =

- One-sheet advertisement

Single by Coca-Cola Official Irish Team
- Released: 1994
- Recorded: 1994
- Studio: Dublin
- Genre: Novelty
- Length: 3:45
- Label: RCA Records

"Watch Your House for Ireland" is a song by the 1994 Republic of Ireland football squad, sponsored by Coca-Cola and with lead vocals by Christy Dignam. It was made for Ireland's 1994 World Cup campaign. The song reached the number one position in the Irish Singles chart in 1994 in the week it was released. The proceeds went to the GOAL charity.

== Lyrics ==
Watch your house was an idiom used in Irish soccer circles, meaning "watch your back." The song featured a famous chant from the Irish defeat of England in UEFA Euro 1988: "What's the score? Up one-nil! Are you listening, Jimmy Hill?"

== Reception ==
Balls.ie described the song as "divisive," while RTÉ described it as "flaccid" and "dull, dull, dull!"
