= Dana Salah =

Jordanian-Palestinian singer-songwriter

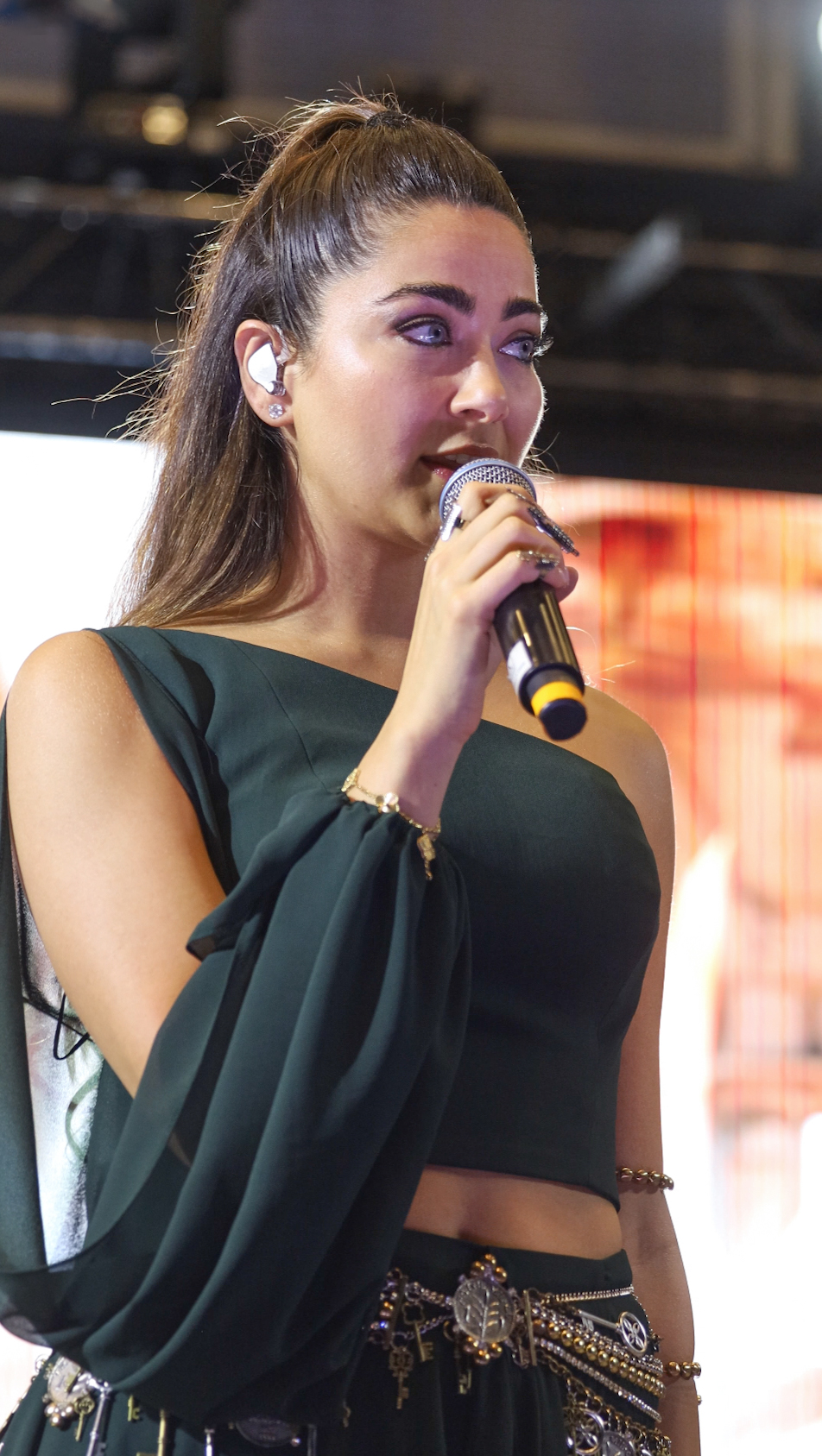
- Salah performing in Houston, Texas in 2025
- Born: 1989 (age 36–37); Amman, Jordan
- Other names: King Deco
- Education: Duke University
- Occupations: Singer; songwriter; producer
- Years active: 2014–present
- Musical career
- Origin: New York City, U.S.
- Genres: Arabic; electronic
- Labels: Universal; Republic
- Website: danasalah.com

Dana Salah (Arabic: دانا صلاح, Levantine Arabic pronunciation: [ˈdæːnæː ˈsˤlˤɑːħ]; born 1989) is a Jordanian singer, songwriter and producer of Palestinian descent.

== Early life and education ==
Salah, whose family was expelled from Haifa, Palestine, in 1948, was born and raised in Amman, Jordan, where she started writing music at the age of 9. As a child, she was diagnosed with ADHD. Following her education at Duke University, North Carolina, she pursued her music career in New York City. She graduated with a B.S. in Economics and a B.A. in Theater Studies in 2012.

== Career ==
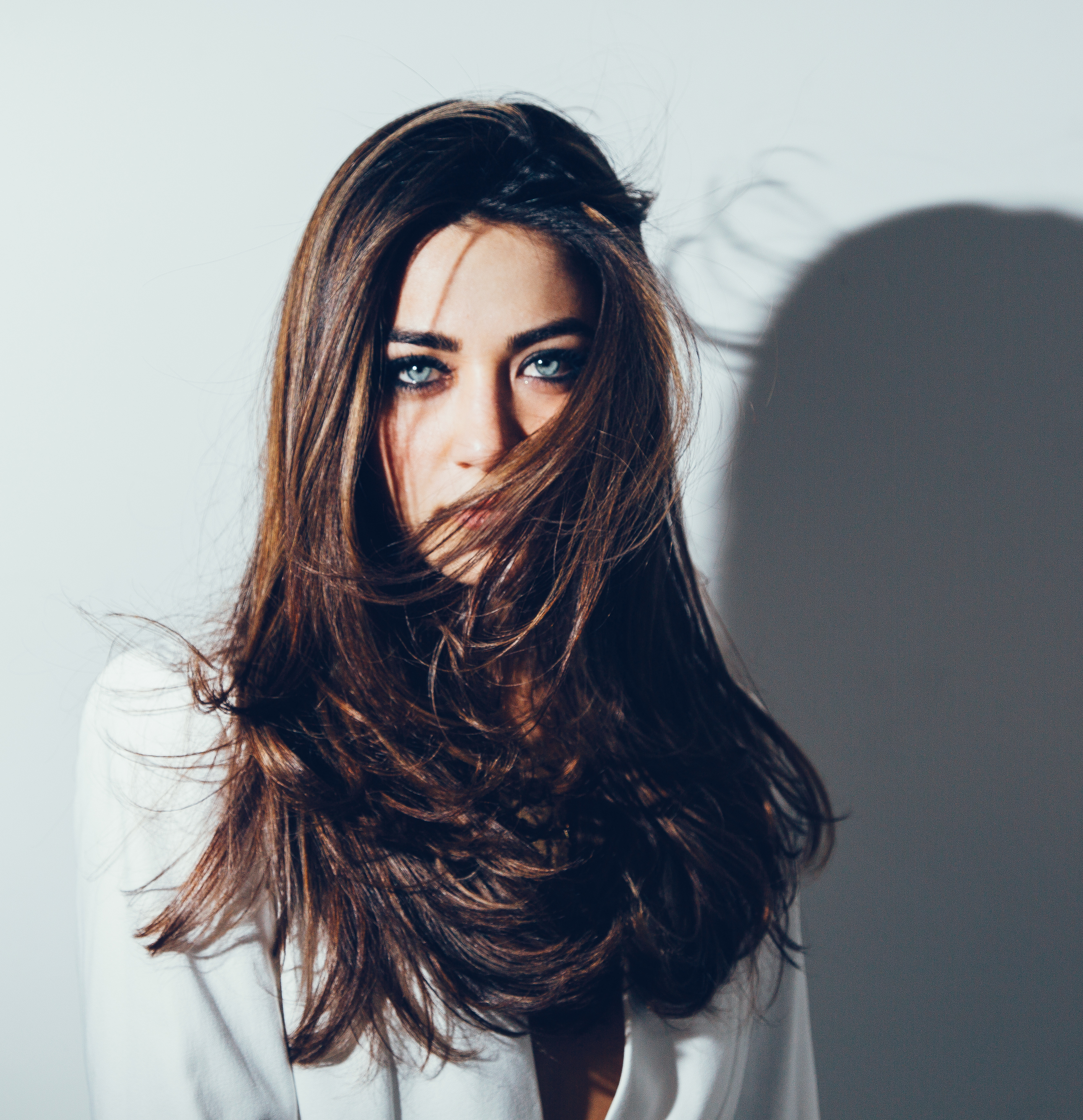
Salah in 2013

Under the stage name King Deco, Salah started her career as a DJ in Brooklyn and as a songwriter for other artists and TV advertising, with one her songs featuring in a Maybelline commercial. She also briefly worked as a model for Bobbi Brown Cosmetics. Her 2017 single "Move That Body" garnered over 11 million streams on Spotify, reached #6 on the US iTunes Dance charts, and peaked at #25 on the Billboard Dance charts. She returned to Jordan in 2018.

In 2021, during the COVID-19 pandemic and following the success of her 2019 single "Castaway", Salah released her first Arabic single, "Weino", under her own name, incorporating sounds of the daf and other traditional Arab instruments. It generated over 1 million views in 3 months on YouTube and was added to more than 1000 personal playlists on Spotify. In 2022 Salah became a Spotify Equal ambassador, making her the first female Jordanian artist to be featured on a billboard in Times Square.

In October 2023, in response to the genocide amid the Gaza war, 25 Middle Eastern and North African artists, including Salah, collaborated on the single "Rajieen". She also released her single "Ya Tal3een" based on the coded Palestinian folk song "Yā Ṭāliʻīn ʻalā l-Jabal" (يا طالعين على الجبل), traditionally sung by women to men jailed in Israeli prisons.

She released the single "Bent Bladek" in June 2025.
