= 7liwa =

Moroccan rapper (born 1996)

- Also known as: 7liwa, Wa7li
- Born: Ihab Ikbal; January 19, 1996 (age 30); Casablanca
- Genres: Rap; trap; rage
- Occupations: Rapper; songwriter
- Years active: 2011-present

Ihab Ikbal (Arabic: إيهاب إقبال; born January 19, 1996), better known by his stage name 7liwa (Arabic: حليوة), is a Moroccan rapper and songwriter from Casablanca. Often considered one of the most influential artists in Moroccan rap, he is credited with pioneering the popularization of trap and rage music in the region. His distinctive fast-flowing style, use of auto-tune, and provocative lyrics have inspired many artists in the scene and paved the way for emerging rap stars such as Inkonnu, ElGrandeToto, and Ily. Some refer to him as "the Lil Wayne of Morocco". 7liwa draws a parallel to Lil Wayne's role in launching the careers of rap stars such as Drake, Tyga, and Nicki Minaj.

== Early life ==
Ihab Ikbal was born in 1996 in Casablanca, Morocco.

== Career ==
7liwa began his musical career around 2011-2012, initially releasing his music on YouTube. His early tracks, such as "Da7k T9ada" and the ten-minute chorus-less song "Batal L3alam", were pivotal in building his reputation for sharp lyricism and establishing his early fame. In 2014, 7liwa collaborated with French rapper Soolking on the track "Bilal". He gained mainstream recognition in 2016 with the music video for "NIK DT", which amassed millions of views, followed by other popular tracks such as "Adidas" and "Haribo". That same year, he performed a concert at Oukacha Prison, the largest penitentiary in Casablanca.

The year 2017 marked a period of prolific activity with the release of three music videos in three months, including "Mimi", which garnered over 22 million views on YouTube. A milestone in his career was signing with Sony Music Entertainment Middle East in 2019. In 2022, he signed a worldwide publishing deal with PopArabia and Reservoir Media, covering his existing catalog and future works.

In 2025, 7liwa announced that he is working on his "retirement album".

== Artistic style and influences ==
7liwa primarily raps in Darija, while also incorporating French and English. He is known for his fast-paced vocal delivery, sharp lyrics, and a provocative approach that often explores themes of personal struggle, societal issues, and darker subjects.

His influence extends beyond his own music; through his Zawa City collective, he helped launch the careers of famous Moroccan rappers such as ElGrandeToto and Inkonnu.

His 2014 horror-inspired music video for the song "Mosi9t Chitan" ("Music of the Devil") was influential in Morocco's music scene.

== Impact ==
7liwa is frequently listed in rankings of top Moroccan rappers. DimaTop Magazine’s “Top 10 Moroccan Rappers” lists him at 4th, noting that modern Moroccan rap is built in large part upon his influence. He is listed among the top five most notable Moroccan rappers by Pan African Music, as well as 5th best Moroccan rapper by Kulture Vulturez.

== Discography ==
=== Albums ===
- La Street (2019)
- Weld Fatima II (2021)
- Champion (2024)

=== Mixtapes ===
- Ktabi Baki (2014)
- #WF (2017)
