= Emirati diaspora =

Emirati diaspora الشتات الإماراتي

Total population
- 203,214

Regions with significant populations
- Kuwait: 26,760
- Canada: 22,608
- Oman: 18,978
- United States: 18,046
- United Kingdom: 17,161
- India: 12,470
- Qatar: 9,558
- Bahrain: 7,954
- France: 5,194
- Australia: 4,415
- Sweden: 3,292
- Netherlands: 2,076
- Germany: 1,152

Languages
- Arabic (Emirati, Gulf, Standard, Shihhi, Omani)

Religion
- Islam (majority Sunni, minority Shia)

Related ethnic groups
- Emiratis

The Emirati diaspora (Arabic: الشتات الإماراتي) refers to Emirati citizens who have emigrated from the United Arab Emirates (UAE) and reside abroad, including those born outside the country, as well as individuals of Emirati ancestry who hold foreign nationality.

== Background ==
A part of the worldwide Arab diaspora, the Emirati diaspora is very small, mainly because of the adequate opportunities provided to citizens in the UAE, removing the need for many to live and work in other countries. Many UAE locals also prefer not to work in menial jobs, opting for well paid government jobs instead. However, some skilled Emirati nationals move abroad to avail better work opportunities or gain valuable experience. According to one report, two out of three UAE nationals who moved abroad tended to have skilled credentials. In response to this, and with the growing number of positions in both the public and private sectors in the UAE over the past few years, the UAE government has promoted Emiratisation and started an initiative called "Return2Home" as part of a reverse brain drain, encouraging job opportunities for expatriate Emiratis returning home.

In addition, many Emiratis go abroad for purposes such as pursuing education in foreign universities, tourism, medical treatment or conducting business. For many Emirati students, studying abroad is an experience of broadening their horizons, international experience and work opportunities, while also reinforcing and keeping most their cultural values.

Most of the small Emirati diaspora is concentrated in the Middle East (mainly the GCC), North America, parts of Europe and Australia. The UAE maintains an extensive diplomatic presence and network of embassies throughout the world.

Emirati nationality law does not offer dual citizenship, hence those who become citizens of other countries have to give up their UAE nationality. The giving up of UAE citizenship is generally frowned upon in Emirati society. Government figures show that around 250 Emiratis became British citizens between 1990 and 2012, while a few others also gained American and Western citizenships over the years. Most such cases are typically of those who have been settled in their resident countries for long periods, or have married foreign spouses.

== Population distribution ==
=== Middle East ===
Many UAE nationals live, study or work in the Arab states of the Arabian Gulf which form the GCC. This is made easier by the fact that citizens of GCC states enjoy freedom of movement throughout all the GCC member countries, including the right to reside and work, with almost no restrictions.

=== South Asia ===
A small number of UAE nationals, including students, are also present in South Asia, mainly in India. and Pakistan

=== Southeast Asia ===
Around 200 Emirati students were studying in Malaysia as of 2012. As of 2009, there were about a hundred UAE citizens in Indonesia.

=== North America ===
The population of Emirati-Americans is estimated at a few thousand. Most UAE nationals in the US are international students. There is also a small Emirati population in Canada, which includes students.

=== Europe ===
There are over 5,400 Emiratis in the United Kingdom. The UK is the most popular destination for Emirati students. About 3,400 students from the UAE were studying in various UK universities. London has the most significant concentration of the Emirati population in the UK. In addition, there are Emiratis in other various countries throughout Europe, mainly students.

=== Oceania ===
In Australia, there were over 1,700 Emirati students as of 2010. There are also a small number of UAE students in New Zealand.

== See also ==
- Arab diaspora
- Foreign relations of the United Arab Emirates
- Emirati passport
- Visa requirements for United Arab Emirates citizens
- Expatriates in the United Arab Emirates
