= Marc Reaidy =

Lebanese opera singer

- Also known as: Marc Reaidy Baz
- Origin: Ghazir, Lebanon
- Genres: Classical crossover; Opera; Pop
- Occupations: Singer; Vocal coach

Marc Reaidy (aka Marc Reaidy Baz, Arabic: مارك رعيدي باز), is a Lebanese tenor, opera crossover singer, actor, and vocal coach. Reaidy is one of the leading classical crossover singers of the Arab World; in 2019, he participated in The Voice Arabia where he was exceptionally inducted into Mohamed Hamaki's already full team of competitors. Reaidy went on to garner widespread acclaim and awards.

== Early life and education ==
Reaidy was born in Ghazir, Lebanon. He is the eldest of three children born to Lebanese army general Gaby Reaidy and Nicole Baz. He completed his musical studies under Russian professor Galina Khaldeeva at the Ecole des Arts Ghassan Yammine, and attended vocal and drama workshops and master classes in Lebanon, Russia, France and the United States.

== Career ==
Reaidy is an accomplished musical artist, and one of the best known tenors of the Arab World. His musical repertoire includes opera music and oratoria from a wide range of European composers. Reaidy is versed in Russian, he sings operatic works by Russian composers such as Tchaikovsky and Rachmaninov, among others. He also sings in Turkish, and Polish in addition to Russian. In 2013, he sang the role of Don José in Bizet's Carmen, produced by The Lebanese Higher National Conservatory with the Lebanese Philharmonic Orchestra. In 2015, he participated in the Beirut Spring Festival where he sang the role of the Pasha, in Turkish, under the direction of Ivan Caracalla.

In 2019, Reaidy sang opera in the Arabic version of The Voice. He garnered praise, and controversy when Egyptian star and panel judge Mohamed Hamaki bent the show rules by adding him to his already full team of competitors; this sparked the contention, then approval of other panel judges. Reaidy continued to the show's next round within Hamaki's team.

In addition to his musical career, Reaidy is a voice coach; he has appeared in television productions Habibi al-Ladoud (My Arch-lover - 2018), and Al-Haremlik (2019); he also serves, sinve 1996, as CFO of A.N. BouKhater, a Lebanese holding company.

== Philanthropy, recognition, and awards ==
Reaidy supports The Neonate Fund, a Lebanese organization that supports needy families of premature and ill newborns, and the Children's Cancer Center of Lebanon. He received the 2021 Best foreign pop-opera singer award in the Ata Çağlayan International Star Awards held in Turkey, and in 2022 the Foreign Music Artist Award at the Altın Çilek Ödülleri music awards, also in Turkey. Reaidy was awarded in 2021 the UAE golden visa for creative people in culture and art.
