= Dumooa Tahseen =

Iraqi singer

- Born: Dumooa Tahseen; February 25, 1991 (age 35); Baghdad, Iraq
- Occupation: Singer
- Notable work: The Voice

Dumooa Tahseen (born 25 February 1991) is an Iraqi singer, known for her Iraqi folk singing. She got her fame after winning The Voice: Ahla Sawt in the fourth season. She also sings in kurdish language.

== Life ==
Tahseen was born in Baghdad to a family of Kurdish descent. She lived with her mother after her parents divorced. She began singing in the restaurants of Amman. She got her fame after her first appearance in The Voice: Ahla Sawt. She teamed up with Ahlam, reaching the final and winning the fourth season of the program.

Awards and achievements
Preceded by Nedaa Sharara	The Voice: Ahla Sawt Winner; 2018	Succeeded by Mehdi Ayachi
