= The Voice Ahla Sawt season 5 =

The Voice Ahla Sawt
- Season 5
- Hosted by: Nardine Farag; Badr Al Zaidan
- Judges: Hamaki; Ahlam; Ragheb Alama; Samira Said
- Winner: Mehdi Ayachi

Release
- Original network: MBC1; MBC Masr
- Original release: September 21, 2019 – present

The fifth season of the Arabic reality talent show The Voice premiered on September 21, 2019, on MBC1 and MBC Masr. Mohamed Hamaki and Ahlam returned as coaches. Ragheb Alama and Samira Said replaced long time coach Assi El Helani and Elissa as coaches.

== Teams ==
Color key

- Winner
- Runner-up
- Third place
- Fourth place
- Eliminated in Live Shows
- Eliminated in the Live Playoffs
- Stolen in the Knockout rounds
- Eliminated in The Knockouts
- Stolen in the Battle rounds
- Eliminated in the Battle rounds
- Withdrew

Coaches	Top 48 artists
Mohamed Hamaki	
Mohamed Hamaki	Marc Reaidy
Elissa	
Ragheb Alama	
Samira Said	
Note: Italicized names are stolen artists (names struck through within former teams). Underlined names are artists who were saved by their coach in the Knockouts and advanced to the Live Playoffs.

== Blind auditions ==
A new feature within the Blind Auditions this season is the Block, which each coach can use once to prevent one of the other coaches from getting a contestant.

Color key

✔	Coach pressed "I WANT YOU" button
	Artist defaulted to a coach's team
	Artist elected a coach's team
	Artist eliminated with no coach pressing their button
✘	Coach pressed the "I WANT YOU" button, but was blocked by Hamaki from getting the artist
✘	Coach pressed the "I WANT YOU" button, but was blocked by Elissa from getting the artist
✘	Coach pressed the "I WANT YOU" button, but was blocked by Ragheb from getting the artist
✘	Coach pressed the "I WANT YOU" button, but was blocked by Samira from getting the artist

=== Episode 1 (Feb. 26) ===
Order	Artist	Song	Coach's and artist's choices			
Order	Artist	Song	Hamaki	Elissa	Ragheb	Samira
1	Mehdi Ayachi	الليل زاهي	✔	✔	✔	✔
