= Jaylann =

Moroccan singer (born 1994)

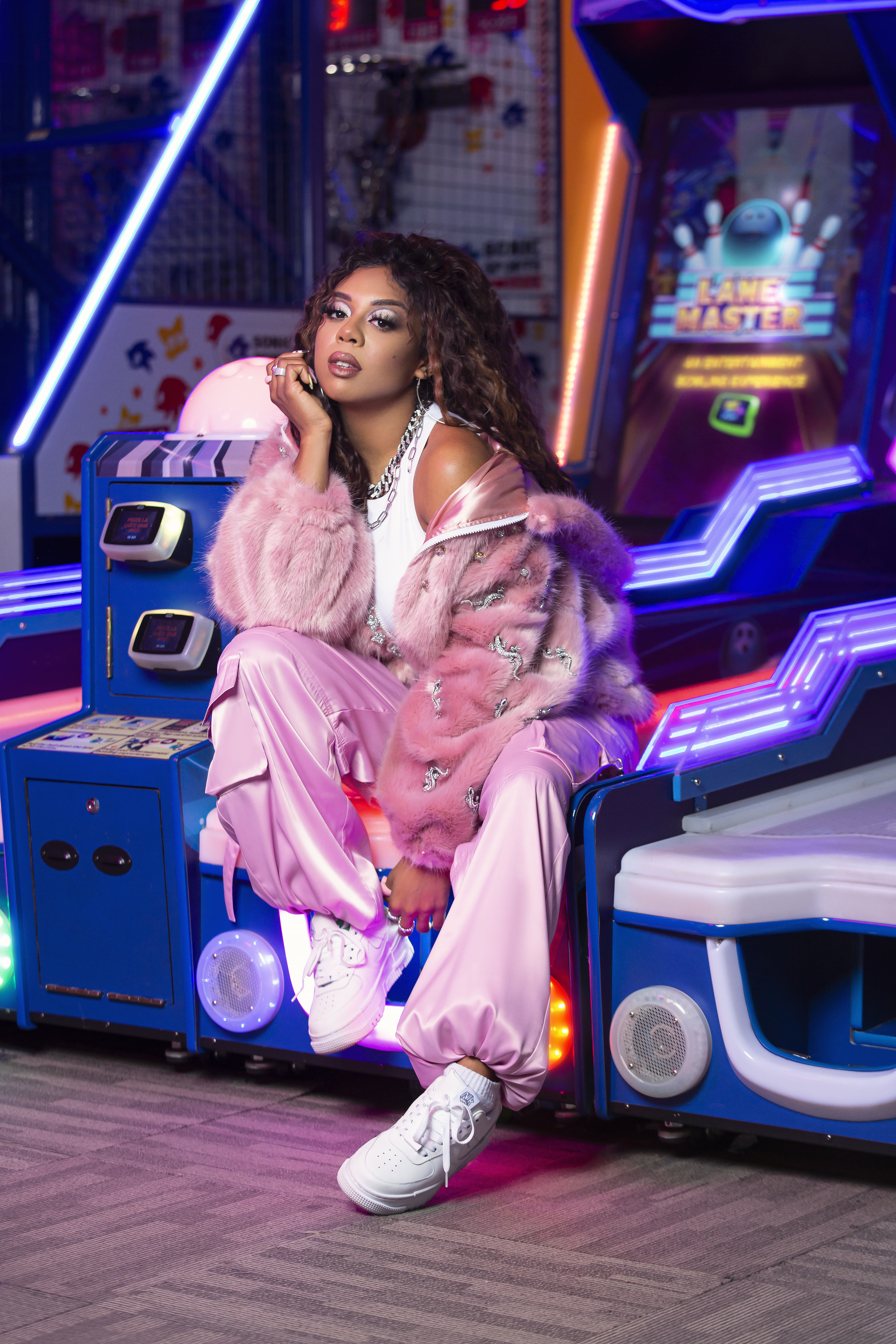

Background information
- Born: Khaoula Moujahid; January 9, 1994 (age 32); Rabat, Morocco
- Genres: Moroccan pop; R&B; Afrobeats; Raï; Chaabi
- Occupations: Singer; Songwriter
- Years active: 2014–present
- Spouse: Abdelilah Arraf (m. 2020)

Khaoula Moujahid (Arabic: خولة مجاهد; born 9 January 1994), known professionally as Jaylann is a Moroccan singer-songwriter.

== Early life and background ==
Khaoula Moujahid was born on 9 January 1994 in Rabat, Morocco. She grew up in a musical environment, as her father, Said Moujahid, is a violinist. She was exposed to music from an early age and developed an interest in both classical Arabic music and international genres, and began singing at the age of nine.

== Musical career ==
Before adopting the stage name Jaylann, she first gained public attention through televised music competitions, including Studio 2M and The Voice: Ahla Sawt in 2014. She went on to appear on Coke Studio, which helped increase her visibility in Morocco and across the Arab music scene.

Jaylann's professional recording career began in 2014 with the release of her debut single, "Kanshofak". In 2016, she collaborated with Black Jaguar on the track "Zaz Louz", which further established her presence in the Moroccan music scene.

Her breakthrough came in 2017 with the release of "Mama", an emotional tribute to motherhood. The song gained widespread popularity online, amassing millions of views across various digital platforms. A year later, following this success, she signed with the Moroccan production company B-Magnitude. It was during this period that she adopted the stage name Jaylann. She has stated that she chose the new name for easier international pronunciation and recognition, noting that her birth name, Khaoula, could be challenging for non-Arabic speakers. According to her, "Jaylann" is of Arabic origin and carries a meaning similar to her real name — "gazelle".

"Ha Wlidi" (2025), a remake of the 1972 song by the Moroccan band Lemchaheb, is regarded as one of Jaylann's most notable releases. Released on 13 June 2025, the track reinterprets the original as a contemporary tribute to Moroccan identity, unity, and cultural pride. Its accompanying music video features traditional Moroccan elements, including kaftans, architecture, and scenes of everyday life, and was widely received by audiences.

Jaylann performed "Ha Wlidi" live at the opening ceremony of the 2024 Women's Africa Cup of Nations, where her performance was praised for its emotional delivery and stage presence. She later took part in the opening ceremony of the 2025 Africa Cup of Nations in Morocco, performing alongside artists such as Angélique Kidjo and L'Artiste.

== Discography ==
=== Singles ===
Title	Year
"L'weekend" (الويكند)	2016
"Ana Kangoul" (أنا كانقول)	2016
"MAMA" (ماما)	2017
"Yalah" (يالاه) (featuring Issam Kamal, Muslim, Foulane Bouhssine and Dj VAN)	2017
"Ana Kangoul" (أنا كانقول)	2016
"Je T'aime"	2017
"Let's Play"	2018
"Allo Allo"	2019
"Chi Wqat" (شي وقات) (featuring Beathoven)	2020
"Étranger" (featuring Beathoven)	2020
"Te Amo"	2021
"Oui Oui"	2022
"DJ"	2023
"Rouhani"	2023
"Nivo Tla3" (النيفو طلع) (with Redouane Ghazir and Stormy)	2024
"Ya Salam" (يا سلام)	2024
"Labass"	2024
"Ha Wlidi" (ها وليدي)	2025
"KHAMSSA W KHMISS" (خمسة و خميس)	2025
"Africallez" (with Lartiste and Angélique Kidjo)	2025
"LA COTE"	2026

== Awards and distinctions ==
She was nominated for the AFRIMA Award for Best Female Artist in North Africa in 2019 (won by Nada Azhari), 2021 (won by Manal), 2022 (won by Faouzia), and 2023.
