= Simor Jalal =

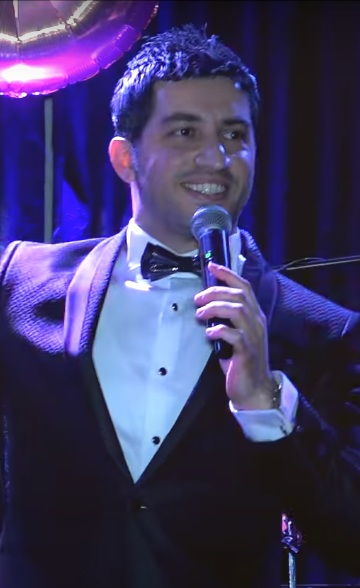
- 2018 New Years Eve concert, Toronto

Background information
- Birth name: Simor Jalal
- Born: July 27, 1983 (age 42)
- Origin: Baghdad, Iraq
- Genres: Classical crossover, Arabic, Arab pop, world, Turkish
- Occupation(s): Musician, composer, singer
- Instrument(s): Oud, Bağlama, Piano, Violin
- Years active: 1999–present

Simor Jalal (Arabic: سيمور جلال; born July 27, 1983), is an Iraqi singer, composer, and musician.

== Career ==
He entered the music department of the Institute of Fine Arts in Baghdad in 1999 and completed his studies there in 2004. Simor studied the oud and Turkish saz, and is also fluent in playing the piano and violin. He has recorded many Iraqi songs, some of his own composing and others composed by well-known Iraqi composers.

He first became well known in the Arab world due to his participation in MBC The Voice, a program on the channel MBC, where he got positive comments from all judges for his musical and vocal skills. He also sang in Syriac and Turkish.

In the summer of 2014 Simor participated in the International Festival of Carthage in Tunisia as an honored guest in at a Saber Rebaï concert.

== "Our people" Charity Campaign -with Naseer Shamma ==
Simor participated in the campaign (our people: Ahlona), along with Iraqi musician Naseer Shamma in 2015. He held a charity concert to collect donations for Iraqi refugees; and at that concert he released two songs composed by musician Naseer Shamma titled: Baghdad and Good morning, my mother. This concert was released in the National Theater 04/05/2015 in Baghdad.

== See also ==
- Saber Rebaï
- Kadhim Al-Sahir
- Mohammed Abdel Wahab
- Nazem Al-Ghazali
- Naseer Shamma
- İbrahim Tatlıses
