= Emirati nationality law =

Federal Law No.17 of 1972

Parliament of the United Arab Emirates
- Long title: An Act relating to Emirati citizenship
- Enacted by: Government of the United Arab Emirates
- Status: Current legislation

Emirati nationality law governs citizenship eligibility in the United Arab Emirates (UAE). The law is primarily jus sanguinis. Foreigners who meet certain criteria and contribute to the UAE may be naturalized and granted citizenship. Gulf Cooperation Council citizens are allowed to live in the UAE without restriction and have the right of freedom of movement.

== Authority ==
The Emirati nationality law is derived from the Federal Law No.17 of 1972 on Nationality and Passports, and is administered by the General Directorate of Residency and Foreigners Affairs (GDRFA) in each emirate.

== Birth in the United Arab Emirates ==
In general, birth in the United Arab Emirates does not, in itself, confer Emirati citizenship as its law utilizes the jus sanguinis principle of nationality law. Exceptions are made for foundlings and adopted children.

In 2022, a new federal law was enacted to allow unmarried mothers to be issued birth certificates for their children born in the UAE.

== Descent ==
The following persons are automatically Emirati citizens by descent:

- Any Arab family settled in any of the member Emirates during or before year 1925, and who has maintained Emirati residence until the coming into force of enforcement of Federal Law No.17 of 1972.
- A person born in the UAE or abroad to an Emirati father.
- A person born in the UAE or abroad to an Emirati mother and whose affiliation to the father is not legally established.
- A person born in the UAE or abroad to an Emirati mother and an unknown or stateless father.
- A person born in the UAE of unknown parents. Unless otherwise established, the foundling shall be deemed born in the UAE.

Children born to an Emirati father or an unknown or stateless father and an Emirati mother are Emirati citizens by descent, irrespective of the place of birth. Until 2017, children born to an Emirati mother and a foreign father could apply and receive Emirati citizenship once they reached age 18. Since October 2017 an Emirati mother can now confer Emirati nationality to her children once they reach six years of age.

== Marriage ==
A foreign woman married to an Emirati national may acquire citizenship provided that the marriage lasts for at least seven years with the condition of having at least one child, or ten years in the absence of children. The wife of a naturalized male citizen may also acquire Emirati citizenship.

== Naturalization ==
Naturalization is restricted due to fear of loss of Emirati national identity and its conservative culture. The basis for these concerns is the prospect of foreigners outnumbering native Emiratis.

Nationality is granted to a foreigner if they fulfill the following conditions and are:

- An Arab with ancestral origins in Bahrain, Oman and Qatar who has been legally settled in the UAE for at least three years and has maintained a good reputation and has not been convicted of a crime.
- Arab individual who enjoys full legal capacity, has continuously and lawfully resided in the member emirates for at least seven years at the date of submitting a naturalisation application, has lawful source of income, is of good reputation and good conduct, and not convicted of any offence involving moral turpitude or dishonesty.
- Any person with Arabic proficiency who has been legally settled in the UAE since 1940 and has maintained a good reputation and has not been convicted of a crime.
- Any person with Arabic proficiency who has been legally settled in the UAE for no less than 30 years with at least 20 years spent after the effective date of the 1972 law and has maintained a good reputation and has not been convicted of a crime.

The residency requirements for Emirati citizenship may be waived:

- by decree from the UAE President.
- to any person who renders honorable service to the UAE.

Any person who wishes to apply for naturalization has to be proficient in the Arabic language, has a legal source of income and has been in a continuous residence in the UAE, has an academic qualification, does not have a bad reputation, and has not been convicted of any crime. A person convicted for misdemeanor or dishonesty may apply on the condition of fulfilling recuperation or rehabilitation. A wife of an Emirati national does not need to have an academic qualification to be eligible for naturalization.

Nationality is granted after:

- a state security background check.
- a ceremony in which the person has sworn allegiance to the UAE.

The right to vote or the right to a nomination for parliament or governmental authority is limited to Emirati citizens by descent. Nationality is only granted once.

== Dual citizenship ==
Dual citizenship, which was earlier banned in the Emirates has been permitted since 2021. The UAE approved amendments in the Emirati Nationality Law to allow investors, professionals, special talents and their families to acquire the Emirati nationality and passport under certain conditions.

The UAE's Prime Minister and ruler of Dubai, Sheikh Mohammed bin Rashid Al Maktoum stated that this amendment to the law was made to attract and retain individuals with specialised skills including scientists, doctors, engineers, creative talent like artists and authors along with their families. Apart from a few common requirements, most requirements are field specific.

Doctors must specialise in unique disciplines or in disciplines which are highly sought after in the UAE. The applicant also need to have contributed to research of scientific value, have a practical experience of 10 years or more, and have obtained a membership to a notable organisation in their field of specialisation.

== Loss of citizenship ==
A citizen by descent may lose Emirati citizenship if:

- they engage in military service of a foreign state without authorization from the UAE government and despite been instructed to abandon the service.
- they act for the interest of an enemy state.

A citizen by naturalization may additionally lose Emirati citizenship if:

- they commit or attempts to commit any act deemed dangerous against the state's security and safety.
- they are convicted repeatedly for disgraceful crimes.
- any forgery, fraud or adulteration is used in the acquisition of nationality.
- they reside outside the UAE without a valid reason for over four consecutive years.

Citizens are allowed to voluntarily give up Emirati citizenship.

== Permanent residency ==
Subject to additional criteria, investors and professionals in healthcare, engineering, science and art are eligible for permanent residency. The permanent residency scheme will be overseen by the Federal Authority for Identity and Citizenship (ICA) and is expected to generate foreign investment, encourage entrepreneurship, and attract engineers, scientists and exceptional students.

== See also ==
- Emirati passport
- Emirati diaspora
- Visa requirements for Emirati citizens
