= The Voice: Ahla Sawt =

Arabic television show

- Genre: Reality television
- Created by: John de Mol Jr.
- Presented by: Arwa Gouda (2012–2014); Mohammad Kareem (2012–2014); Nadine Wilson Njeim (2012–2014); Aimée Sayah (2015); Momen Nour (2015); Nardin Faraj (2018–2019); Badr Al Zaidan (2018); Yasir Al-Saggaf (2019–)
- Judges: Assi El Helani (2012–2018); Sherine (2012–2015); Saber Rebaï (2012–2015); Kadim Al Sahir (2012–2015); Elissa (2018-2018); Ahlam (2018–2019); Mohamed Hamaki (2018–2019); Ragheb Alama (2019); Samira Said (2019); Nassif Zeytoun (2025–present); Rahma Riad (2025–present); Ahmed Saad (2025–present)
- Country of origin: Arab world
- Original language: Arabic
- No. of seasons: 6
- No. of episodes: 68

Production
- Production companies: Talpa (2012–2019); Sony Pictures Television Arabia (2012–2014); ITV Studios (2025–)

Original release
- Network: MBC 1, LBCI
- Release: 14 September 2012 – 21 December 2019
- Release: 29 October 2025 – present

The Voice: Ahla Sawt (Arabic: ذا فويس: أحلى صوت; Ahla Sawt meaning "The Most Beautiful Voice") is the Arabic version of Dutch show The Voice of Holland created by John de Mol Jr. and produced by Talpa Media Group. The first season of MENA's version of The Voice debuted on 14 September 2012 and was broadcast worldwide from Beirut, Lebanon via MBC 1, a pan-Arabian television station. Through an agreement, the show was also simulcast via LBCI's channels. The first two season's main host was Egyptian actor Mohammad Kareem and Arwa Gouda. Nadine Wilson Njeim hosted from backstage.

The format of The Voice: Ahla Sawt has three stages, which are the blind auditions, the battle rounds, and the live performances. In the blind auditions, each contestant will be allowed to sing for 90 seconds with each of the coaches having their backs to the singer. When a coach wants a singer on their team, the coach presses a red button that results in the chair being turned around to reveal who the singer is to that coach and the singer joining their team. If two or more coaches turn around for that singer, the singer gets to decide which team they want to join. Each coach will have to select 12 singers to form their team from a group of 100 contestants.

Once the blind auditions finish, the battle rounds will begin where the coaches will pair two singers on each team to compete against each other singing the same song on stage. The coaches will then have to decide which contestant will stay and which will be eliminated. After a series of eliminations, live performances will occur where the public can decide which singer will represent the Arab World as "The Voice".

The winner of season 1 of The Voice Ahla Sawt was Murad Bouriki from Team Assi who received the highest number of votes beating out Yousra Mahnouch, Farid Ghannam, and Qusai Hatem.

Due to the high ratings and big popularity the series got in the Arab World, MBC renewed the show for a second season which aired in 2013. All 4 coaches of season 1 came back for season 2. The second season premiered on Saturday, 28 December 2013.

The Voice: Ahla Sawt seasons 1 and 2 were produced by Sony Pictures Television Arabia for MBC and Season 3 was produced by Talpa Middle East.

In season two, during an intense finale which drew millions of viewers across the Middle East & North Africa, guest star Ricky Martin took the stage to perform his new songs "Adrenalina" and "Come With Me". Iraq's Sattar Saad from Team Kadim won the title after receiving the highest number of votes beating out Iraq's Simor Jalal, Egypt's Wahm and Syria's Hala Al Kaseer.

All four coaches once again returned for season three of The Voice Ahla Sawt, which started airing on MBC on 26 September 2015. On 26 December 2015, the winner of season three was Jordan's Nedaa Sharara from Team Sherine who beat out Lebanon's Christine Said from Team Kadim, Iraq's Ali Yousef from Team Assi, and Tunisia's Hamza Fadlaoui from Team Saber.

In 2015, a spin-off of the show featuring children as contestants debuted under the title The Voice Kids – Ahla Sawt.

In 2018, there was a change in the judging panel. The season 4 judges were Elissa, Mohamed Hamaki, Assi El Helani (who had not been replaced since season 1) and Ahlam. The title was won by Iraqi contestant Doumou' Tahseen from Team Ahlam.

The first episode of the fifth season was broadcast on 21 September 2019. In addition to previous coaches Ahlam and Hamaki, the season saw two new coaches: Moroccan singer Samira Said and Lebanese popstar Ragheb Alama, the latter of whom had the winner team this season.

The sixth season premiered on 29 October 2025 with a panel reduced to three coaches: Nassif Zeytoun, Rahma Riad, and Ahmed Saad. Joudy Shahen from Team Rahma was the winner of the season.

== The Voice coaches ==
=== Coaches' timeline ===
Coaches	Seasons					
Coaches	1	2	3	4	5	6
Assi El Helani						
Kadim Al Sahir						
Sherine						
Saber Rebaï						
Ahlam						
Mohamed Hamaki						
Elissa						
Ragheb Alama						
Samira Said						
Nassif Zeytoun						
Rahma Riad						
Ahmed Saad						

- Kadim Al Sahir – Iraqi composer-musician, singer and poet
- Sherine – Egyptian pop star and actress
- Assi El Helani – Lebanese singer
- Saber Rebaï – Tunisian composer-musician
- Elissa – Lebanese singer
- Ahlam – Emirati singer
- Mohamed Hamaki – Egyptian singer
- Ragheb Alama – Lebanese singer
- Samira Said – Moroccan pop singer
- Nassif Zeytoun – Syrian pop singer
- Rahma Riad – Iraqi singer
- Ahmed Saad – Egyptian singer

== Series overview ==
Color key

- Team Kadim
- Team Sherine
- Team Saber
- Team Assi
- Team Mohamed
- Team Ahlam
- Team Elissa
- Team Ragheb
- Team Samira
- Team Nassif
- Team Rahma
- Team Ahmed

Season	Aired	Winner	Runner-up	Third Place	Fourth Place	Winning coach	Host	Coaches (chair's order)			
Season	Aired	Winner	Runner-up	Third Place	Fourth Place	Winning coach	Host	1	2	3	4
1	2012	Mourad Bouriki	Fareed Ghanam	Qusai Hatem	Yousra Mahnouch	Assi El Helani	Mohammed Kareem	Kadim	Sherine	Saber	Assi
2	2013-2014	Sattar Saad	Hala Alina Quasser	Simour Jalal	Wahm	Kadim Al Sahir	Mohammed Kareem	Kadim	Sherine	Saber	Assi
3	2015	Nedaa Sharara	Christine Saïd	Ali Youssef	Hamza Fadlaoui	Sherine	Aimée Sayah	Kadim	Sherine	Saber	Assi
4	2018	Dumooa Tahseen	Issam Sarhan	Yusuf Sultan	Hela Melki	Ahlam	Nardine Farag	Assi	Ahlam	Elissa	Mohamed
5	2019	Mehdi Ayachi	Iman Ghani	Fahd Mouftakhi	Radwan Al Asmar	Ragheb Alama	Nardine Farag	Mohamed	Ahlam	Ragheb	Samira
6	2025-2026	Joudy Shahen	Ashraqat Ahmed	Mohannad Al-Basha	—N/a	Rahma Riad	Yasir Al-Saggaf	Ahmed	Rahma	Nassif	—N/a

== The Voice Senior – أحلى صوت ==
Color key

- Team Melhem
- Team Samira
- Team Najwa
- Team Hany

Season	Aired	Winner	Runner-up	Other finalists		Winning coach	Host(s)	Coaches (chair's order)			
Season	Aired	Winner	Runner-up	Other finalists		Winning coach	Host(s)	1	2	3	4
1	2020	Abdou Yaghi	Suad Hassan	Faisal Al Hallaq	Mervat Kamel	Melhem Zein	Annabella Hilal	Hany	Samira	Najwa	Melhem

=== Coaches' timeline ===
Coaches	Seasons
Coaches	1
Melhem Zein	
Samira Said	
Najwa Karam	
Hany Shaker	

== The Voice finalists ==
Color key
– Winning coach and their team.
Winners are in bold, finalists in finale listed first, eliminated artists are in small font.

Season	Coaches and their finalists			
1	Assi El Helani	Saber Rebaï	Sherine	Kadim Al-Saher
1	**Mourad Bouriki**; Mory Hatem; Hassan Amara; Elie Asmar; Marina Chebel; Inas Lattouf	Qusai Hatem; Lamia Zaïdi; Samer Abu Taleb; Lamia Jamal; Christian Abu Anni; Mona Roukhachi	Farid Ghannam; Mohammad Adli; Enji Amin; Abdel Azeem Zahabi; Alaa Ahmad; Yousra Mansour	Yousra Mahnouch; Nour Ereksousi; Xriss Jor; Rouba Khouri; Roni Shemali; Rawdan Katrish
2
2	Hala Al Qasser; Adnan Bresim; Ghazi Al-Amir; Reem Mehrat; Amer Tawfik; Sahar Seddiki; Rabih Jaber; Nadia Khaless	Simour Jalal; Mohammed Fares; Marwa Nagy; Samer Al-Saeed; Eyad al-Quassam; Nancy Nasrallah; Aïda Mohammed; Hossam Hosny	Wahm; Nile; Karar Salah; Khaled El-Khayat; Mohamed Dahleb; Mahmoud Tourabi; Wael Al Muallem; Alaa Fouad	**Sattar Saad**; Khaoula Moujahid; Ammar Khattab; Ahmad Hussein; Ghazi Khattab; Ingrid Bawab; Sanae Abdel-Hamid; Mehvan Saleh
3
3	Ali Yousef; Omar Dean; Nayress Ben Gaga; Rehab Saleh; Ahmed Nasser; Hossam Al Shami	Hamza Fadhlaoui; Aboud Barmada; Mahrazia Touil; Jad Abi Haydar; Ranine Al Shaar; Abdulsamad Jabran	**Nedaa Sharara**; Ghassan Ben Brahim; Eyad Bahaa; Abdulmajeed Ibrahim; Mohamed Al Tayeb; Reham Mustafa	Christine Said; Najat Rajoui; Radwan Sadek; Tamer Najm; Amjad Shaker; Nasser Atoui
4	Assi El Helani	Ahlam	Elissa	Mohamed Hamaki
4	Yusuf Sultan; Eya Daghnouj; Maryse Ferzly; Safa Saad; Rita Camilos; Batoul Bani	**Dumooa Tahseen**; Faisal Al-Ansari; Olga El Kadi; Souha El Masri; Abdelrahman Al Mofarij; Fouad El Jaritly	Hela Melki; Khaled Helmi; Hassan El Attar; Ahmed El Hellak; Giana Ghantous; Rabih Hajjar	Issam Sarhan; Houcine Ben Haj; Chaima Abdelaziz; Rana Atiq; Elyas Mabrouk; Ali Rasheed
5	Ragheb Alama	Ahlam	Samira Said	Mohamed Hamaki
5	**Mehdi Ayachi**; Michel Chalhoub; Dua Lahyaoui; Youssef Hennad; Nouha Rhaiem; Charaf Ahmed	Eman Abdelghani; Rabab Najid; Aida Oulmou; Ibrahim Machwali; Nourhan El Morshdi; Ali al-Shareefi	Redwan El Asmar; Cindy Latty; Maher Sami; Clara Atallah; Omar Al Attas; Toufic Al Kalash	Fahd Mouftakhir; Yamane El Haj; Hafida Falkou; Bahaa Khalil; Ahmed Abdelaziz; Wiam Redouane
	Stolen contestants italicized			
