= Emirati passport =

Passport of the United Arab Emirates issued to Emirati citizens

Emirati passport; Arabic: جَوَاز ٱلسَّفَر ٱلْإِمَارَاتِي, romanized: Jawāz As-Safar Al-ʾImārātī
- Front cover of the current Emirati passport (with chip), issued since December 2011

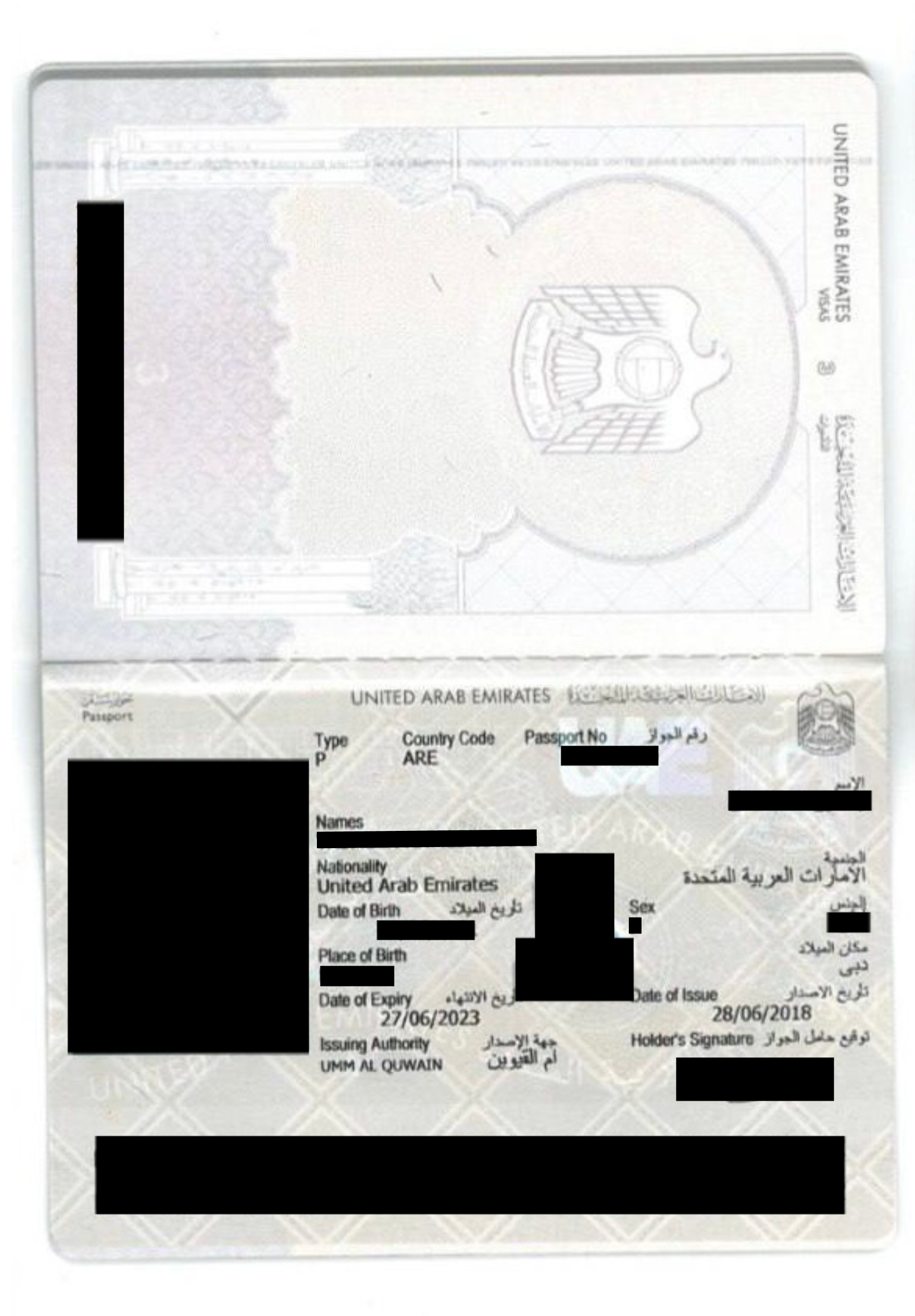
- The identity information page of a contemporary Emirati biometric passport
- Type: Passport
- Issued by: United Arab Emirates Federal Authority for Identity, Citizenship, Customs & Port Security (ICP): (Regular and Temporary); Ministry of Foreign Affairs: (Diplomatic, Special, and Service)
- First issued: 1971 (first version); December 11, 2011 (biometric); September 2022 (Second Generation Biometric Passport)
- Purpose: Identification
- Eligibility: Emirati citizenship
- Expiration: 10 years after acquisition for applicants aged 21 or over, 5 years for applicants under 21 years old
- Cost: 40 (US$10.89) For 5 Years; 90 (US$24.51) For 10 Years; 40 (US$10.89) For replacement

The Emirati passport (Arabic: جَوَاز ٱلسَّفَر ٱلْإِمَارَاتِي, romanized: Jawāz As-Safar Al-ʾImārātī) is a travel document issued by the government of the United Arab Emirates (UAE) to individuals holding any form of Emirati nationality. It grants the bearer international passage in accordance with visa requirements and serves as proof of UAE citizenship. It also facilitates access to consular assistance from the UAE embassies around the world.

According to the Passport Index 2026, the UAE passport ranks 1st globally in terms of mobility score, with access to 181 destinations without requiring a prior visa. That includes 44 visa on arrival, and 10 with electronic travel authorization.

== History ==
Prior to the formation of the United Arab Emirates in 1971, each constituting emirate issued its own passports or travel documents. These documents were printed in both Arabic and English and often made a reference to the issuing emirate and its ruling sheikh.

Emirati passports issued since 11 December 2011 have been biometric passports. The UAE is the second GCC state (after Qatar) to issue such passports.

== Types ==
Emirati passports types are indicated by Federal Law No.27 regarding Nationality and Passports issued in 1972:

- Regular Passport (navy blue cover): issued to UAE citizens.
- Special Passport (green cover): issued to members of the Federal National Council, retired high-ranking government officials and their families. The passport can also be issued by a federal decision from the Supreme Federal Council to Emirati state representatives. This passport has the same visa regime as the diplomatic passport.
- Diplomatic Passport (red cover): issued to members of the Federal Supreme Council and diplomats serving in Emirati embassies abroad and to high-ranking officials from the executive branch and their families during their period of service.
- Service or Temporary Passport (cyan cover): issued to citizens and non-citizens for a specific period of time to perform a service or a particular task of interest to the state. This passport if issued to non-citizens does not bestow a right of abode in the UAE.
- Emergency Passport (grey cover): issued to citizens of the UAE who lost their passport abroad or lost their identity card in the GCC or their passport expired abroad or issued in times of a natural disaster or evacuation.

== Physical appearance ==
The first and last pages are made of hard paper, thicker than that of the old design. The first page contains a watercolour outline of the outer frame of Sheikh Zayed Grand Mosque and the last page contains a drawing of the actual mosque with domes and columns. The passport identity page has all the particulars printed and laminated. The new passports contain data to resolve name duplication, an issue that existed with old passports.

Like passports of other states whose official language is written from right-to-left, the Emirati passport is similarly opened from the left-hand side.

=== Generic design ===
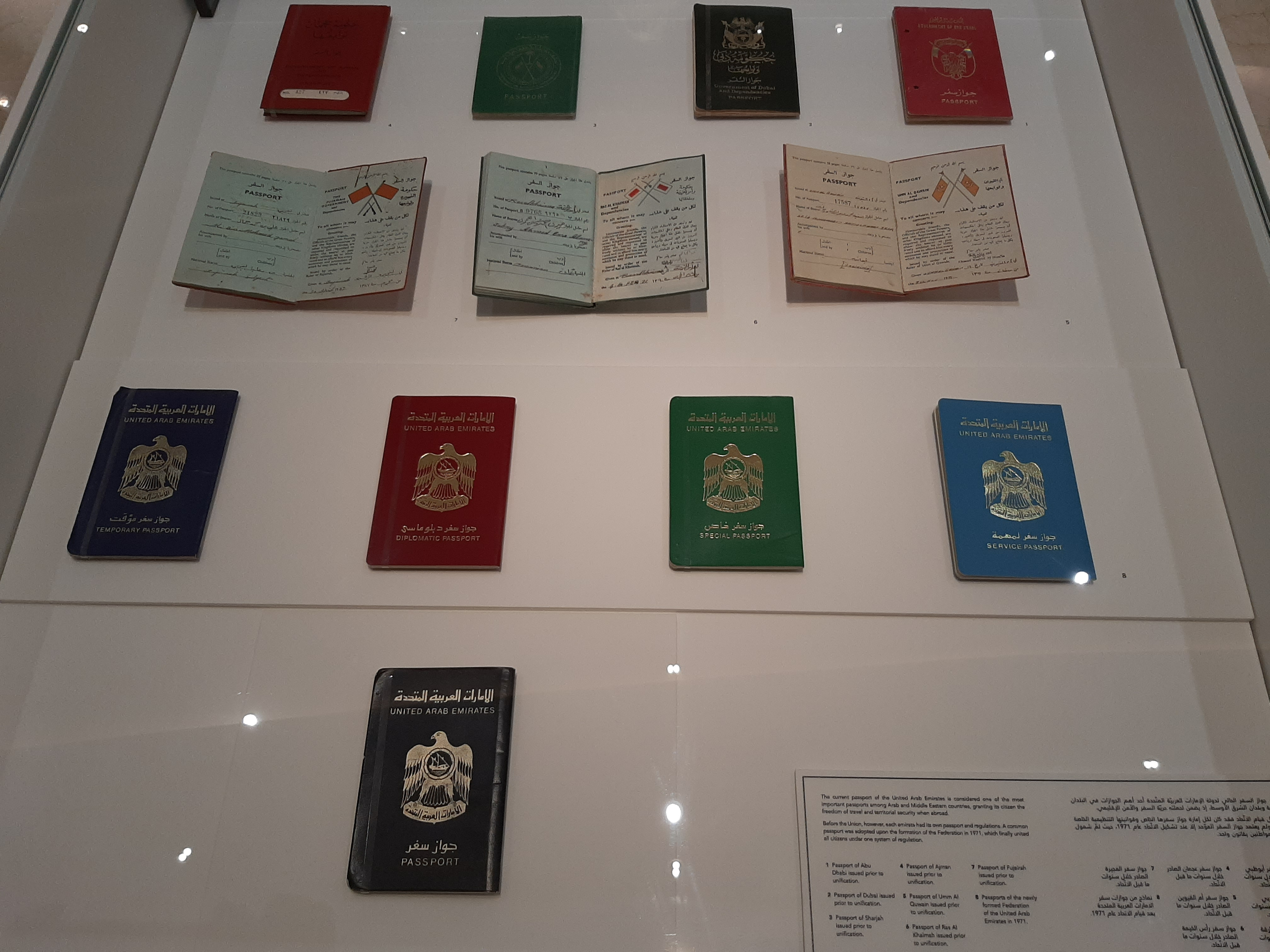
Old and New passports

On the front cover of the each passport type, there is a representation of the emblem of the United Arab Emirates in the centre. The emblem was modified in 2008, and passports issued afterwards incorporated the new design. "United Arab Emirates" (in Arabic: "دولة الامارات العربية المتحدة" (in Arabic calligraphy) and in English) appears above the coat of arms.

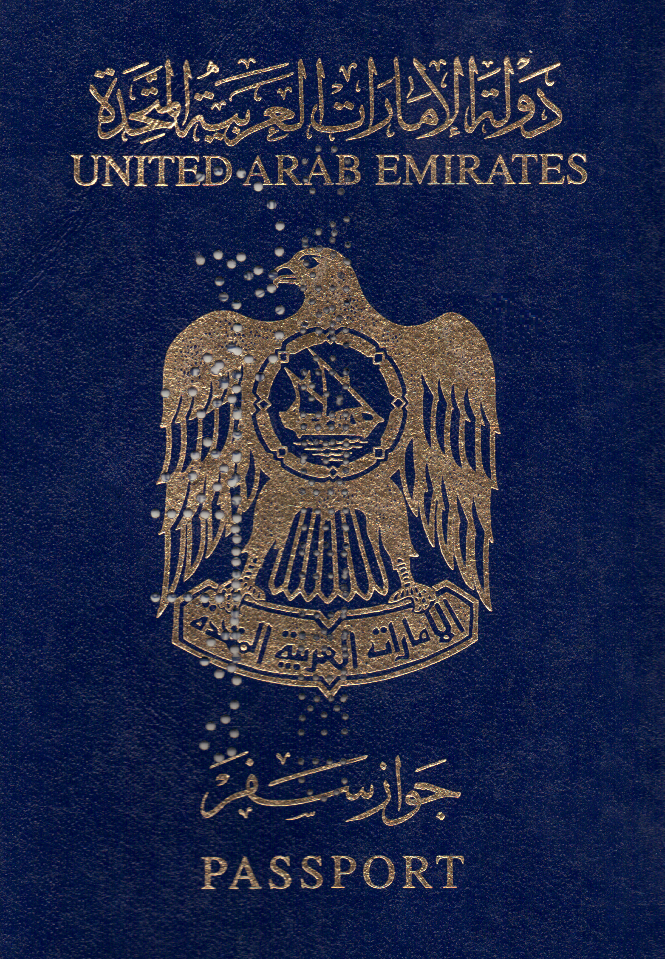
Older passport.

Regular passports have Arabic: "جواز سفر" in Arabic calligraphy and "PASSPORT" in English below the coat of arms.

Special passports have Arabic: "جواز سفر خاص" in Arabic calligraphy and "SPECIAL PASSPORT" in English below the coat of arms.

Diplomatic passports have Arabic: "جواز سفر دبلوماسي" in Arabic calligraphy and "DIPLOMATIC PASSPORT" in English below the coat of arms.

A biometric passport has the biometric passport e-passport symbol at the bottom. There are 62 pages in all biometric passport, and the last page contains encrypted biometric data to prevent forgery.

=== Identity Information page ===
The second page of an Emirati passport is security laminated and includes the following data:

- Photo of passport owner
- Type of document (P = passport)
- Code for issuing country (ARE = United Arab Emirates)
- Passport number (9 alphanumeric digits, chosen from numerals 0–9 and letters C, F, G, H, J, K, L, M, N, P, R, T, V, W, X, Y, Z. Thus, "0" denotes the numeral, not the letter "O".)
- Full Name
- Date of birth
- Sex
- Nationality
- Place of birth
- Date of issue
- Date of expiry
- Authority that issued the passport
- Owner's signature
- ID Number

The page ends with a 2-line machine readable zone, according to ICAO standard 9303. The country code is ARE as is the standard country code for United Arab Emirates (according to ISO 3166-1 alpha-3).

=== Inside cover ===
UAE-issued Emirati passports contain on their inside cover the following words:

In Arabic:

"باسم صاحب السمو رئيس دولة الإمارات العربية المتحدة، يرجو سعادة رئيس الهيئة الاتحادية للهوية والجنسية والجمارك وأمن المنافذ من جميع المعنيين بدولة الإمارات العربية المتحدة والدول الأخرى أن يسمحوا لحامل هذا الجواز بالمرور بحرية وأن يقدموا له كل مساعدة وحماية قد يحتاج إليها"

In English:

By the Name of H. H. The President of the United Arab Emirates, His Excellency the Chairman of the Federal Authority for Identity & Citizenship, Customs & Port Security requests all the concerned in the United Arab Emirates and other countries to allow the holder of the passport free passage and to provide him with all assistance and protection he may need.

=== Languages ===
The data/information page is printed bilingually in both Arabic and English in all fields except for a white label in the next-to-last page in the passport which contains the United Arab Emirates Ministry of Interior emblem and documents the citizen's military specific claim number and uniform number.

== Visa requirements ==
Visa requirements for Emirati citizens United Arab Emirates Freedom of movement Visa not required Visa on arrival eVisa Visa available both on arrival or online Visa required Travel banned by the UAE government due to safety concerns or admission refused

Visa requirements for Emirati citizens are administrative entry restrictions by the authorities of other states placed on citizens of the UAE.

As of April 2026, Emirati citizens have visa-free or visa on arrival access to 187 countries and territories, ranking the Emirati passport 2nd in the world in terms of travel freedom, tied with Japan and South Korea, according to the Henley Passport Index.

The Emirati passport is one of five passports with the greatest improvement in visa-free rating in the 2006–2016 time period.

In 2017, The UAE Ministry of Foreign Affairs and International Cooperation planned to make the UAE passport one of the five strongest passports in the world by 2021. According to The Passport Index, this goal was achieved by December 2018, ranking the Emirati passport as the strongest passport in the world with a visa-free score of 170.

The UAE, Albania and Kosovo are the only Muslim-majority countries where citizens have the right to travel to Israel without a pre-arranged travel visa.

UAE citizens can check visa requirements for their destination by visiting the Ministry of Foreign Affairs website.

== See also ==
- Visa requirements for Emirati citizens
- Visa policy of the United Arab Emirates
- Emirati nationality law
