= Xriss Jor =

Lebanese singer (born 1986)

Xriss Jor (first name pronounced ‘Chris’; born June 17, 1986) is a Lebanese singer and artist. Born and raised in Yahchouch, Mount Lebanon, Lebanon, she gained prominence after her appearance on the talent show The Voice: Ahla Sawt. In 2012, Jor came in fourth but went on to win the Dubai Music Week in 2013 where she received a management contract from Quincy Jones. Jor went on to cover Michael Jackson's "They Don't Care About Us" to comment on the garbage crisis happening in Lebanon, with Quincy's full support of her political statement. Her version of the song not only supports the "You Stink" movement in Lebanon, but also is a commentary on political dysfunction in Lebanon.
