= Mohamed Hamaki =

Egyptian singer (born 1975)

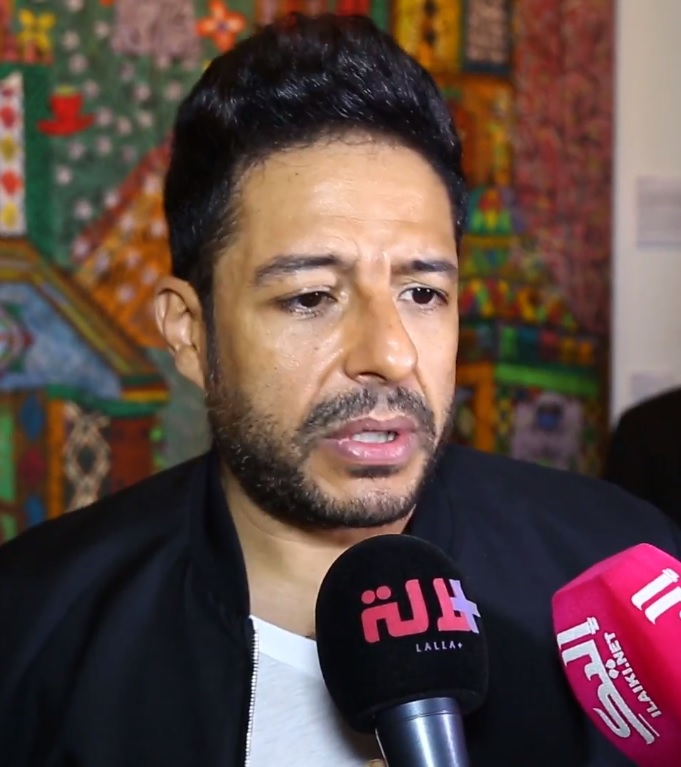

Background information
- Born: Mohamed Ibrahim Mohamed El Hamaki; 4 November 1975 (age 50); Cairo, Egypt
- Genres: Pop; egyptian music
- Occupations: Singer; songwriter; actor
- Instruments: Vocals; guitars; piano; percussion; drums; keyboard
- Years active: 1997–present
- Labels: Delta Sound; Nogoum Records; Ki Records
- Website: hamaki.me

Mohamed Ibrahim Mohamed El Hamaki (Arabic: محمد إبراهيم محمد الحماقي [mæˈħæm.mæd ebɾɑˈhiːm elˈħæˈmæːʔi]; born 4 November 1975) is an Egyptian singer. In 2010, he won the "Best Arabia Act" award from MTV Europe Music Awards and the Music Award in 2006, for "Ahla Haga Fiki". He was a coach at the fifth season of The Voice Ahla Sawt in 2019.

== Early life and career ==
Mohamed Hamaki was born on 4 November 1975.

On 3 July 2011, Hamaki was rushed to hospital after suffering multiple heart attacks whilst recording for his album, Mn Alby Baghany .

In September 2021, Hamaki collaborated with the American company Epic Games for a concert in the creative mode of the popular videogame Fortnite. In this concert several of his songs could be heard. Additionally, his song Leilet El Omr was premiered in the same concert, along with this an emote with part of this song was made available for purchase in the game's Item Shop.

== Personal life ==
On December 7, 2011 Hamaki Married Nahla El Hagry. They later divorced in 2014. In April 2016, two years after their divorce, Hamaki and Nahla reconciled and remarried. Hamaki announced that his wife had given birth to a girl on June 6, 2017 whom he named Fatma.

== Discography ==
- Khallina Neysh (2003)
- Ya Ana Ya Enta (2005)
- Kheles El Kalam (2006)
- Bahebak Kol Youm Aktar (2007)
- Naweeha (2008)
- Haga Mosh Tabeaya (2010)
- Mn Alby Baghany (2012)
- Omro Ma Yegheeb (2015)
- Kol Youm Men Dah (2019)
- Ya Fatenny (2021)
- Howa El Asas (2024)
- Samma3ony (2026)
