= Mehdi Ayachi =

Mehdi Ayachi مهدي عياشي
- Born: 9 July 1985 (age 41); Zarzouna, Bizerte, Tunisia
- Genres: Arabic pop; Hadra
- Occupations: Singer; Composer
- Instrument: Vocals
- Years active: 2017–present
- Award: The Voice: Ahla Sawt fifth season Winner

Mehdi Ayachi (Arabic: مهدي عياشي; born on 9 July 1985 in Zarzouna, Bizerte, Tunisia) is a Tunisian singer and composer. On 21 December 2019, he won the title of the fifth season of The Voice: Ahla Sawt as a member of coach Ragheb Alama's team.

Ayachi is married and has a daughter.

== Discography ==
=== Singles ===
- 2017: I saw eyes (شفت عيون)
- 2017: My greedy eyes (عيني الطماعة)
- 2019: Sailor (بحار)
- 2021: A song for my father (غناية لبابا)
- 2021: Laugh with who (اضحك مع مين)
- 2022: Confusing wounds (محير لجراح)
- 2023: Your love is medicine (حبك دواء)
- 2024: I got (حصلت)
- 2025: You're not like them (ماكش كيفهم)
- 2025: Arab son (ولد عرب)
- 2025: She is fleeting (راهي فانية)
- 2025: The gate of paradise (باب الجنة)

== Awards ==
Year	Award	Result	Ref.
2019	The Voice: Ahla Sawt	Won	
