= Visa requirements for Emirati citizens =

Administrative entry restrictions

The cover of a biometric Emirati passport

Visa requirements for Emirati citizens are administrative entry restrictions by the authorities of other states placed on citizens of the United Arab Emirates.

As of 2026, Emirati citizens have visa-free or visa on arrival access to 187 countries and territories, ranking the Emirati passport 2nd in the world according to the Henley Passport Index.

The Emirati passport is one of five passports with the greatest ranking improvement in the 2006–2016 time period.

Emirati citizens do not need a visa to enter other Gulf Cooperation Council (GCC) countries and also have the right to work and reside in those countries. Similarly, citizens of other GCC states do not need a visa to enter the UAE. GCC citizens can use a GCC national identity card (rather than a passport) to enter the United Arab Emirates.

== History ==
Visa requirements for Emirati citizens were lifted by New Zealand (in July 1999), Brunei (11 October 2003), Kyrgyzstan (July 2012), Kazakhstan (July 2014), the Schengen Area countries (7 May 2015), Belarus (30 April 2016), Moldova (24 March 2017), São Tomé and Príncipe (25 April 2017), Argentina (16 May 2017), Chad and Saint Lucia in October 2017, Nauru (19 November 2017), Solomon Islands (19 November 2017), Chile (16 December 2017), Rwanda (30 December 2017), Ukraine (31 December 2017), China (16 January 2018), Burkina Faso (30 January 2018), Ireland (31 January 2018), Uruguay (5 April 2018), Tonga (24 May 2018), Honduras (25 May 2018), Brazil (2 June 2018), Canada (5 June 2018), Barbados (1 July 2018), Mexico (31 October 2018), Russia (17 February 2019), Uzbekistan (20 March 2019) South Africa (15 August 2019), Paraguay (16 August 2019), Central African Republic (8 October 2019), Kiribati (23 October 2019), Israel (22 October 2020), Peru (8 November 2020), Tajikistan (January 2022), Japan (28 September 2022), Angola (September 2023), Turkey (1 January 2024) United Kingdom (22 February 2024), and Bolivia (1 December 2025).

The first possibility of electronic visas for Emirati citizens began with the United Kingdom's electronic visa waiver (EVW) program that commenced on 1 January 2014, followed by India in November 2014, Lesotho on 1 May 2017, Benin on 1 January 2018, Uzbekistan on 15 July 2018, and Tanzania on 26 November 2018.

Visas on arrival for UAE citizens were introduced by Gabon in October 2017, Guyana on 28 May 2018, Pakistan on 14 March 2019, Mongolia on 15 May 2019 and Equatorial Guinea on 28 July 2019 (Diplomatic and Official passport).

== Visa requirements map ==
Visa requirements for Emirati citizens holding ordinary passports United Arab Emirates Freedom of movement Visa not required / ETA (Note: ETA required for Canada if arriving by air, Israel, Kenya, New Zealand, Saint Kitts and Nevis, Seychelles and the United Kingdom) Visa on arrival eVisa Visa available both on arrival or online Visa required

== Visa requirements ==
Country	Visa requirement	Allowed stay	Notes (excluding departure fees)
Afghanistan	Travel restricted		e-Visa : Visitors must arrive at Kabul International (KBL).; Visitors may apply for an e-Visa in other countries, excluding some countries of residence (include United Arab Emirates).; The Emirati government restricts Emirati citizens from travelling to Afghanistan except for diplomats, emergency treatment cases and pre-authorized official, scientific and economic delegations.
Albania	Visa not required	90 days	
Algeria	Visa required		Persons may be denied entry if entering with a passport containing visas or stamps issued by Israel.; Visitors on tours organized to some southern regions by an approved travel agency may obtain a visa on arrival for up to 30 days.
Andorra	Visa not required		
Angola	Visa not required	30 days	30 days per trip, but no more than 90 days within any 1 calendar year for tourism purposes only.; Visitors must have a return/onward ticket and a hotel reservation confirmation.; An International Certificate of Vaccination is required.
Antigua and Barbuda	Visa not required	30 days	
Argentina	Visa not required	90 days	
Armenia	Visa not required	180 days	
Australia	Online Visa required		May apply online (Online Visitor e600 visa).
Austria	Visa not required	90 days	90 days within any 180-day period in the Schengen Area.
Azerbaijan	Visa not required	90 days	90 days within any 180-day period.
Bahamas	Visa not required	3 months	
Bahrain	Freedom of movement	Freedom of movement.; ID card valid.	
Bangladesh	Visa on arrival	30 days	
Barbados	Visa not required	90 days	
Belarus	Visa not required	90 days	90 days within any 180-day period.
Belgium	Visa not required	90 days	90 days within any 180-day period in the Schengen Area.
Belize	Visa required		Permanent residents and holders of multiple entry visa of the United States may obtain a visa on arrival. Bearers of valid visas issued by a Schengen Member State are visa exempt for a maximum stay of 90 days.
Benin	Visa not required	90 days	Must have an international vaccination certificate.
Bhutan	eVisa	90 days	The Sustainable Development Fee (SDF) of 200 USD per person, per night for almost all visitors to Bhutan. Additionally, if payment is made in US dollars from September 1, 2023 to August 31, 2027, the SDF is 100 USD.
Bolivia	Visa not required	90 days	
Bosnia and Herzegovina	Visa not required	90 days	90 days within any 6-month period.
Botswana	Visa not required	90 days	
Brazil	Visa not required	90 days	
Brunei	Visa not required	30 days	
Bulgaria	Visa not required	90 days	90 days within any 180-day period in the Schengen Area.
Burkina Faso	Visa not required	30 days	The change is not reflected in IATA Timatic, so travelers may be denied boarding.
Burundi	Online Visa / Visa on arrival	1 month	Pre-arranged visa can be collected on arrival.
Cambodia	eVisa / Visa on arrival	30 days	
Cameroon	eVisa		
Canada	Electronic Travel Authorization	6 months	eTA required if arriving by air, but are not required when arriving by car, bus, train or boat (including a cruise ship).
Cape Verde	Visa on arrival (EASE)	30 days	Visa on arrival may applied for via the online platform (EASE) and issued at international airports in Sal, Boa Vista, São Vicente or Santiago. Visa fee is approximately 25–30 EUR.; Visitors must pay the Airport Security Fee (TSA) before visiting. The cost is 3,400 CVE (approx. 31 EUR) and can be paid via the online platform (EASE).
Central African Republic	Visa on arrival		The change is not reflected in IATA Timatic, so travelers may be denied boarding.
Chad	Visa not required	90 days	
Chile	Visa not required	90 days	
China	Visa not required	30 days	
Colombia	Visa not required	90 days	90 days - extendable up to 180-days stay within a one-year period.
Comoros	Visa on arrival	45 days	
Republic of the Congo	Visa on arrival	30 days	Visa not required for passengers with a VIP invitation letter.
Democratic Republic of the Congo	eVisa	7 days	Passenger with a letter (Visa Volant) issued by the Ministry of Interior and Security can obtain a visa on arrival.
Costa Rica	Visa not required	90 days	
Côte d'Ivoire	eVisa	3 months	e-Visa holders must arrive via Port Bouet Airport.
Croatia	Visa not required	90 days	90 days within any 180-day period in the Schengen Area.
Cuba	Visa not required	90 days	
Cyprus	Visa not required	90 days	90 days within any 180-day period.
Czech Republic	Visa not required	90 days	90 days within any 180-day period in the Schengen Area.
Denmark	Visa not required	90 days	90 days within any 180-day period in the Schengen Area.
Djibouti	eVisa / Visa on arrival	90 days	
Dominica	Visa not required	21 days	
Dominican Republic	Visa not required	90 days	
Ecuador	Visa not required	90 days	
Egypt	Visa not required	90 days	
El Salvador	Visa not required	90 days	
Equatorial Guinea	eVisa / Visa on arrival		
Eritrea	Visa required		Pre-arranged visa can be picked up on arrival.
Estonia	Visa not required	90 days	90 days within any 180-day period in the Schengen Area.
Eswatini	Visa not required	30 days	
Ethiopia	eVisa / Visa on arrival	90 days	Visa on arrival is obtainable only at Addis Ababa Bole International Airport.; e-Visa holders must arrive via Addis Ababa Bole International Airport.; e-Visa is available for 30 or 90 days.
Fiji	Visa not required	4 months	
Finland	Visa not required	90 days	90 days within any 180-day period in the Schengen Area.
France	Visa not required	90 days	90 days within any 180-day period in the Schengen Area.
Gabon	eVisa	90 days	e-Visa holders must arrive via Libreville International Airport.
Gambia	Visa not required	90 days	
Georgia	Visa not required	360 days	
Germany	Visa not required	90 days	90 days within any 180-day period in the Schengen Area.
Ghana	eVisa / Visa on arrival	30 days	According to IATA, UAE citizens can no longer obtain a visa on arrival.
Greece	Visa not required	90 days	90 days within any 180-day period in the Schengen Area.
Grenada	Visa not required	3 months	
Guatemala	Visa not required	90 days	
Guinea	eVisa / Visa on arrival	90 days	
Guinea-Bissau	Visa on arrival	90 days	
Guyana	Visa not required	30 days	
Haiti	Visa not required	3 months	
Honduras	Visa not required	90 days	90 days within any 180-day period.
Hungary	Visa not required	90 days	90 days within any 180-day period in the Schengen Area.
Iceland	Visa not required	90 days	90 days within any 180-day period in the Schengen Area.
India	eVisa / Visa on arrival	30 days / 60 days	e-Visa holders must arrive via 32 designated airports (Note: Ahmedabad; Amritsar; Bagdogra; Bengaluru; Bhubaneswar; Chandigarh; Chennai; Coimbatore; Delhi; Gaya; Goa-Dabolim; Goa-Manohar; Guwahati; Hyderabad; Indore; Jaipur; Kannur; Kochi; Kolkata; Kozhikode; Lucknow; Madurai; Mangaluru; Mumbai; Nagpur; Port Blair; Pune; Surat; Thiruvananthapuram; Tiruchirappalli; Varanasi; Visakhapatnam) or 5 designated seaports. (Note: Chennai; Cochin; Mormugao; Mumbai; Mangalore); An Indian e-Tourist Visa may only be obtained twice within 1 calendar year.; Foreigners of Pakistani origin or who hold a Pakistani Passport are not eligible for an e-Visa. Foreigners who are not Pakistani nationals, but whose parents or grandparents (either paternal or maternal) were born in, or were permanent residents in Pakistan, are also not eligible for an e-Visa.; Visa on arrival is applicable to UAE citizens if they had earlier obtained e-Visa or regular/paper visa for India. This facility is not available to citizens if they or either of their parents or grandparents (paternal or maternal) was born in or is a permanent resident of Pakistan.; Visa on arrival is only available at the following airports: Bengaluru; Chennai; Delhi; Hyderabad; Kolkata; Mumbai; Kochi; Kozhikode; Ahmedabad
Indonesia	e-VOA / Visa on arrival	30 days	
Iran	Visa not required	15 days	
Iraq	eVisa	30 days	
Ireland	Visa not required	90 days	
Israel	Electronic Travel Authorization	90 days	Validity of ETA-IL is 2 years from the date of approval.
Italy	Visa not required	90 days	90 days within any 180-day period in the Schengen Area.
Jamaica	Visa on arrival	30 days	The change is not reflected in IATA Timatic, so travelers may be denied boarding.
Japan	Visa not required	90 days	
Jordan	Visa not required	3 months	
Kazakhstan	Visa not required	30 days	
Kenya	Electronic Travel Authorisation	90 days	Applications can be submitted up to 90 days prior to travel and must be submitted at least 3 days in advance.; eTA fee is 32.50 USD.; Proof of reservation at the hotel where visitors plan to stay is required (if staying with friends, an invitation letter is also acceptable).; Yellow fever vaccination certificate is required if coming from endemic countries.; Visitors can also be entered on an East Africa tourist visa issued by Rwanda or Uganda.
Kiribati	Visa not required	30 days	
North Korea	Visa required		
South Korea	Visa not required	90 days	K-ETA exemption until the end of 2026.; The validity period of a K-ETA is 3 years from the date of approval.
Kuwait	Freedom of movement	Freedom of movement.; ID card valid.	
Kyrgyzstan	Visa not required	60 days	
Laos	eVisa / Visa on arrival	30 days	18 (Note: Savannakhet Airport; Lanetoui - Mengkang (China); Meuangmom - Wan Pong (Myanmar); Banvang - Ban Khok Phai (Thailand); Namngeun - Huay Kon (Thailand); Paksan - Bueng Kan (Thailand); Paktaphan - Pak Saeng (Thailand); Pangmon - Ban Huak (Thailand); Phoudou (Thailand); Dak ta ock - Nam Giang (Vietnam); La Lai (Vietnam); Namkan (Vietnam); Namphao - Cau Treo (Vietnam); Namsoy - Na Meo (Vietnam); Naphao - Cha Lo (Vietnam); Pahang - Long Sap (Vietnam); Panghok - Tây Trang (Vietnam); Phoukeua - Bo Y (Vietnam)) of the 33 border crossings are only open to regular visa holders.; e-Visa may be used to enter Laos through the Luang Prabang, Pakse and Vientiane international airports, 3 Thai-Lao Friendship Bridges (Note: Vientiane (Friendship Bridge 1); Savannakhet (Friendship Bridge 2); Bokeo (Friendship Bridge 4)), in Boten (road and railroad), and in Vientiane (at Khamsavath railway station).; Visa on arrival is available at the Luang Prabang, Pakse and Vientiane international airports, 4 Thai-Lao Friendship Bridges (Note: Vientiane (Friendship Bridge 1); Savannakhet (Friendship Bridge 2); Khammouane (Friendship Bridge 3); Bokeo (Friendship Bridge 4)) and 7 border crossings. (Note: Nongnokkheane - Trapeang Kriel (Cambodia); Boten - Bo han (China); Golden Triangle/Samliemkham (Thailand); Khamsavath railway station (Thailand); Namheuang - Ban Na Kraseng (Thailand); Vang tao - Chongmek (Thailand); Dansavan - Lao Bảo (Vietnam))
Latvia	Visa not required	90 days	90 days within any 180-day period in the Schengen Area.
Lebanon	Visa not required	6 months	Emiratis do not need a visa to enter Lebanon. (6 months - extendable to 1-year).
Lesotho	Visa required		
Liberia	e-VOA	3 months	
Libya	eVisa		
Liechtenstein	Visa not required	90 days	90 days within any 180-day period in the Schengen Area.
Lithuania	Visa not required	90 days	90 days within any 180-day period in the Schengen Area.
Luxembourg	Visa not required	90 days	90 days within any 180-day period in the Schengen Area.
Madagascar	eVisa / Visa on arrival	90 days	For stays of 61 to 90 days, the visa fee is 59 USD.
Malawi	eVisa / Visa on arrival	30 days	
Malaysia	Visa not required	3 months	
Maldives	Free visa on arrival	30 days	
Mali	Visa not required	90 days	
Malta	Visa not required	90 days	90 days within any 180-day period in the Schengen Area.
Marshall Islands	Visa on arrival	90 days	
Mauritania	eVisa	30 days	Available at any international airport or land border crossing.
Mauritius	Visa not required	90 days	
Mexico	Visa not required	180 days	
Micronesia	Visa not required	30 days	
Moldova	Visa not required	90 days	90 days within any 180-day period.
Monaco	Visa not required		
Mongolia	Visa not required	30 days	
Montenegro	Visa not required	90 days	
Morocco	Visa not required	3 months	
Mozambique	Electronic Travel Authorization	30 days	Visitors must register their ETA on the e-Visa platform at least 48 hours before travel and pay a processing fee of 48 USD. In addition, an extension of 30 days is possible.
Myanmar	Visa required		Visa on arrival if passengers with a letter of approval issued by the Ministry of Hotels and Tourism.
Namibia	eVisa / Visa on arrival	3 months / 90 days	Visa on arrival is available at the following locations: Hosea Kutako International Airport; Impalila Island; Katima Mulilo; Ngoma; Trans Kalahari (Buitepos); Walvis Bay Airport
Nauru	Visa not required	90 days	
Nepal	Online Visa / Visa on arrival	90 days	
Netherlands	Visa not required	90 days	90 days within any 180-day period in the Schengen Area.
New Zealand	Electronic Travel Authority	3 months	International Visitor Conservation and Tourism Levy must be paid upon requesting an Electronic Travel Authority.; Holders of an Australian Permanent Resident Visa or Resident Return Visa may be granted a New Zealand Resident Visa on arrival permitting indefinite stay (pursuant to the Trans-Tasman Travel Arrangement), subject to meeting character requirements and obtaining an Electronic Travel Authority prior to departure. Such travellers are not required to pay the International Visitor Conservation and Tourism Levy.
Nicaragua	eVisa		
Niger	Visa on arrival		
Nigeria	eVisa	30 days	Holders of written e-Visa approval issued by the Immigration Authority can obtain a visa on arrival, provided they hold a visa application form and e-Visa application payment receipt and have an invitation letter from a Nigerian company accepting immigration responsibilities.
North Macedonia	Visa not required	90 days	
Norway	Visa not required	90 days	90 days within any 180-day period in the Schengen Area.
Oman	Freedom of movement	Freedom of movement.; ID card valid.	
Pakistan	Visa not required	90 days	
Palau	Free visa on arrival	30 days	
Panama	Visa not required	90 days	
Papua New Guinea	eVisa / Visa on arrival	60 days	Visa on arrival available at Port Moresby airport.; You can apply for a visa online under the "Tourist - Own Itinerary" category.
Paraguay	Visa not required	90 days	
Peru	Visa not required	90 days	90 days within any 180-day period.
Philippines	Visa not required	30 days	A single or multiple entry eVisa for stays of up to 59 days is also available.
Poland	Visa not required	90 days	90 days within any 180-day period in the Schengen Area.
Portugal	Visa not required	90 days	90 days within any 180-day period in the Schengen Area.
Qatar	Freedom of movement	Freedom of movement.; ID card valid.	
Romania	Visa not required	90 days	90 days within any 180-day period in the Schengen Area.
Russia	Visa not required	90 days	90 days within any 180-day period.; As of June 30, 2025, foreigners entering Russia without a visa must pre-register in the Gosuslugi RuID Gosuslugi RuID mobile app and receive a digital code at least 72 hours before entry.
Rwanda	eVisa / Visa on arrival	30 days	Visitors can also be entered on an East Africa Tourist Visa issued by Kenya or Uganda.
Saint Kitts and Nevis	Electronic Travel Authorisation	3 months	
Saint Lucia	Visa not required	60 days	
Saint Vincent and the Grenadines	Visa not required	3 months	
Samoa	Entry permit on arrival	90 days	
San Marino	Visa not required		
São Tomé and Príncipe	Visa not required	15 days	
Saudi Arabia	Freedom of movement	Freedom of movement.; ID card valid.	
Senegal	Visa not required	90 days	
Serbia	Visa not required	90 days	
Seychelles	Electronic Border System	3 months	Application can be submitted up to 30 days before travel.; Visitors must upload a reservation confirmation(s) for each visitor's location of stay in Seychelles.; Yellow fever vaccination certificate is required if coming from endemic countries.; Payment of the fee (EUR 10) by credit or debit card.; Valid for one journey only and it expires once exit the country.
Sierra Leone	eVisa / Visa on arrival	3 months / 30 days	
Singapore	Visa not required	30 days	
Slovakia	Visa not required	90 days	90 days within any 180-day period in the Schengen Area.
Slovenia	Visa not required	90 days	90 days within any 180-day period in the Schengen Area.
Solomon Islands	Visa not required	90 days	
Somalia	eVisa	30 days	
South Africa	Visa not required	90 days	
South Sudan	eVisa		Obtainable online 30 days single entry for 100 USD, 90 days multiple entry for 200 USD and 180 days multiple entry for 350 USD.; Printed visa authorization must be presented at the time of travel.
Spain	Visa not required	90 days	90 days within any 180-day period in the Schengen Area.
Sri Lanka	ETA / Visa on arrival	30 days	
Sudan	Visa not required		
Suriname	Visa not required	90 days	An entrance fee of USD 50 or EUR 50 must be paid online prior to arrival.; Multiple entry e-Visa is also available.
Sweden	Visa not required	90 days	90 days within any 180-day period in the Schengen Area.
Switzerland	Visa not required	90 days	90 days within any 180-day period in the Schengen Area.
Syria	eVisa / Visa on arrival		According to IATA, visitors can be issued a visa on arrival.
Tajikistan	Visa not required / eVisa	30 days / 60 days	
Tanzania	eVisa / Visa on arrival	90 days	
Thailand	Visa not required	60 days	Maximum 2 visits annually if not arriving by air.
Timor-Leste	Visa on arrival	30 days	
Togo	eVisa	15 days	
Tonga	Visa not required	60 days	
Trinidad and Tobago	Visa not required	90 days	
Tunisia	Visa not required	90 days	
Turkey	Visa not required	90 days	90 days within any 180-day period.
Turkmenistan	Visa required		10-day visa on arrival if holding a letter of invitation provided by a company registered in Turkmenistan with a prior approval from the Foreign Ministry. Visitors can apply to extend their stay for an additional 10 days.; When transiting between two non-bordering countries, visitors can obtain a Turkmenistan transit visa for a five-day stay. This must be applied for in advance at the Turkmenistan Embassy. Visitors must also submit copies of the visas for the country of entry into Turkmenistan and the country of departure from Turkmenistan. Visa fee is 20 USD.
Tuvalu	Visa on arrival	1 month	
Uganda	Visa not required	90 days	Visitors can also be entered on an East Africa Tourist Visa issued by Kenya or Rwanda.
Ukraine	Visa not required	90 days	
United Kingdom	Electronic Travel Authorisation	6 months	Authorisation lasts up to 2 years, with multiple entries permitted.
United States	Visa required		
Uruguay	Visa not required	3 months	
Uzbekistan	Visa not required	30 days	
Vanuatu	Visa not required	90 days	
Vatican City	Visa not required		
Venezuela	eVisa		Introduction of Electronic Visa System for Tourist and Business Travelers.
Vietnam	eVisa		e-Visa is valid for 90 days and multiple entry.
Yemen	Visa on arrival	3 months	Separately, Yemen introduced an e-Visa system for visitors who meet certain eligibility requirements (group travel of 10 or more people, business trips, and transit etc.).
Zambia	Visa not required	30 days	Also eligible for a universal visa allowing access to Zimbabwe.
Zimbabwe	eVisa / Visa on arrival	1 month	Also eligible for a universal visa allowing access to Zambia.

== Dependent, disputed, or restricted territories ==
=== Unrecognized or partially recognized countries ===
Territory	Conditions of access	Allowed Stay	Notes
Abkhazia	Visa required		Tourists from all countries (except Georgia) can visit Abkhazia for a period not exceeding 24 hours as part of an organized tourist group.
Kosovo	Visa not required	90 days	
Northern Cyprus	Visa not required	90 days	
Palestine	Visa not required		Arrival by sea to Gaza Strip not allowed.
Sahrawi Arab Democratic Republic			Undefined visa regime in the Western Sahara controlled territory.
Somaliland	Visa on arrival	30 days	30 days for 30 USD, payable on arrival.
South Ossetia	Visa required		To enter South Ossetia, visitors must have a multiple-entry visa for Russia and register their stay with the Migration Service of the Ministry of Internal Affairs within 3 days.
Taiwan	eVisa	30 days	Emiratis can apply for a single-entry e-Visa.; e-Visa is valid for 3 months from the date of issue, permitting a 30-day non-extendable stay.
Transnistria	Visa not required	24 hours	Registration required after 24h.

=== Dependent and autonomous territories ===
Territory	Conditions of access	Allowed Stay	Notes
China
Hong Kong	Visa not required	30 days	
Macau	Visa not required	30 days	
Denmark
Faroe Islands	Visa not required		
Greenland	Visa not required		
Ecuador
Galápagos	Pre-registration required	60 days	60 days; Visitors must pre-register to receive a 20 USD Transit Control Card (TCT).
France
Clipperton Island	Special permit required		
French Guiana	Visa not required	90 days	90 days within any 180-day period.
French Polynesia	Visa not required	90 days	90 days within any 180-day period.
Guadeloupe	Visa not required	90 days	90 days within any 180-day period.
Martinique	Visa not required	90 days	90 days within any 180-day period.
Saint Barthélemy	Visa not required		
Saint Martin	Visa not required		
Mayotte	Visa not required	90 days	90 days within any 180-day period.
New Caledonia	Visa not required	90 days	90 days within any 180-day period.
Réunion	Visa not required	90 days	90 days within any 180-day period.
Saint Pierre and Miquelon	Visa not required	90 days	90 days within any 180-day period.
Wallis and Futuna	Visa not required	90 days	90 days within any 180-day period.
Netherlands
Aruba	Visa not required	90 days	
Bonaire	Visa not required	90 days	
Sint Eustatius	Visa not required	90 days	
Saba	Visa not required	90 days	
Curaçao	Visa not required	90 days	
Sint Maarten	Visa not required	90 days	
New Zealand
Cook Islands	Visa not required	31 days	
Niue	Visa not required	30 days	
Tokelau	Visa required		
Norway
(Norway) Jan Mayen	Permit required		Permit issued by the local police required for staying for less than 24 hours and permit issued by the Norwegian police for staying for more than 24 hours.
(Norway) Svalbard	Visa not required		Unlimited period under Svalbard Treaty.
United Kingdom
Akrotiri and Dhekelia	Visa not required		Same visa regime as Cyprus.
Anguilla	eVisa		Holders of a valid visa issued by the United Kingdom do not require a visa.
Bermuda	Visa not required(conditional)		Visa-free for a maximum stay of 3 months if arriving from or transiting through the United Kingdom.
British Indian Ocean Territory	Special permit required		Special permit required.
British Virgin Islands	Visa required		
Cayman Islands	Visa required		
Falkland Islands	Visa not required		A visitor permit is normally issued as a stamp in the passport on arrival, The maximum validity period is 1 month.
Gibraltar	Visa required		
Montserrat	eVisa		
Pitcairn Islands	Visa not required	14 days	Landing fee 35 USD or tax of 5 USD if not going ashore.
Saint Helena	eVisa		
Ascension Island	eVisa	3 months	3 months within any year-period.
Tristan da Cunha	Permission required		Permission to land required for £15/30 (yacht/ship passenger) for Tristan da Cunha Island or £20 for Gough Island, Inaccessible Island or Nightingale Islands.
South Georgia and the South Sandwich Islands	Permit required		Pre-arrival permit from the Commissioner required (72 hours/1 month for £110/160).
Turks and Caicos Islands	Visa not required	90 days	
United States
American Samoa	Visa required		
Guam	Visa required		
Northern Mariana Islands	Visa required		
Puerto Rico	Visa required		
U.S. Virgin Islands	Visa required		
Antarctica and adjacent islands
Antarctica	Special permits required		Special permits required for Bouvet Island, British Antarctic Territory, French Southern and Antarctic Lands, Argentine Antarctica, (Australia) Australian Antarctic Territory, (Antártica Chilena Province) Chilean Antarctic Territory, (Australia) Heard Island and McDonald Islands, (Norway) Peter I Island, (Norway) Queen Maud Land, (New Zealand) Ross Dependency.

== Non-visa restrictions ==
=== Blank passport pages ===
Many countries require a minimum number of blank pages to be available in the passport being presented, typically one or two pages. Endorsement pages, which often appear after the visa pages, are not counted as being valid or available.

=== Vaccination ===
Cover of the new International Certificate of Vaccination issued by the Bureau of Quarantine in the Philippines since 2021

The African countries of Angola, Benin, Burkina Faso, Burundi, Cameroon, Central African Republic, Democratic Republic of the Congo, Republic of the Congo, Côte d'Ivoire, Gabon, Ghana, Guinea-Bissau, Mali, Niger, Sierra Leone and Togo, South Sudan and Uganda, along with French Guiana in South America, require all incoming passengers older than nine months to one year, to have a current International Certificate of Vaccination or Prophylaxis.

Some other countries require vaccination only if the passenger is coming from an infected area or has visited one recently or has transited for 12 hours in those countries: Algeria, Botswana, Cabo Verde, Chad, Djibouti, Egypt, Eswatini, Ethiopia, Gambia, Ghana, Guinea, Lesotho, Libya, Equatorial Guinea, Eritrea, Madagascar, Malawi, Mauritania, Mauritius, Mozambique, Namibia, Nigeria, Papua New Guinea, Seychelles, Somalia, South Africa, Sudan, Tunisia, Uganda, Tanzania, Zambia and Zimbabwe.

=== Passport validity length ===
Very few countries, such as Paraguay, just require a valid passport on arrival.

However many countries and groupings now require only an identity card – especially from their neighbours. Other countries may have special bilateral arrangements that depart from the generality of their passport validity length policies to shorten the period of passport validity required for each other's citizens or even accept passports that have already expired (but not been cancelled).

Some countries, such as Japan, Ireland and the United Kingdom, require a passport valid throughout the period of the intended stay.

In the absence of specific bilateral agreements, countries requiring passports to be valid for at least 6 more months on arrival include Afghanistan, Algeria, Anguilla, Bahrain, Bhutan, Botswana, British Virgin Islands, Brunei, Cambodia, Cameroon, Cape Verde, Cayman Islands, Central African Republic, Chad, Comoros, Costa Rica, Côte d'Ivoire, Curaçao, Ecuador, Egypt, El Salvador, Equatorial Guinea, Fiji, Gabon, Guinea Bissau, Guyana, Haiti, India, Indonesia, Iran, Iraq, Israel, Jordan, Kenya, Kiribati, Kuwait, Laos, Madagascar, Malaysia, Marshall Islands, Mongolia, Myanmar, Namibia, Nepal, Nicaragua, Nigeria, Oman, Palau, Papua New Guinea, Peru, Philippines, Qatar, Rwanda, Samoa, Saudi Arabia, Singapore, Solomon Islands, Somalia, Sri Lanka, Sudan, Suriname, Tanzania, Thailand, Timor-Leste, Tokelau, Tonga, Turkey, Tuvalu, Uganda, United Arab Emirates, Vanuatu, Venezuela, and Vietnam.

Countries requiring passports valid for at least 4 months on arrival include Micronesia and Zambia.

Countries requiring passports with a validity of at least 3 months beyond the date of intended departure include Azerbaijan, Bosnia and Herzegovina, Honduras, Montenegro, Nauru, Moldova and New Zealand. Similarly, the EEA countries of Iceland, Liechtenstein, Norway, all European Union countries (except Ireland) together with Switzerland also require 3 months validity beyond the date of the bearer's intended departure unless the bearer is an EEA or Swiss national.

Countries requiring passports valid for at least 3 months on arrival include Albania, North Macedonia, Panama, and Senegal.

Bermuda requires passports to be valid for at least 45 days upon entry.

Countries that require a passport validity of at least one month beyond the date of intended departure include Eritrea, Hong Kong, Lebanon, Macau, the Maldives and South Africa.

==== Maximum passport age ====
Countries of the Schengen area require non-EU passports to be less than 10 years old upon entry.

=== Criminal record ===
Some countries, including Australia, Canada, Fiji, New Zealand and the United States, routinely deny entry to non-citizens who have a criminal record, while others impose restrictions depending on the type of conviction and the length of the sentence.

=== Persona non grata ===
The government of a country can declare a diplomat persona non grata, banning them from entering the country or expelling them if they have already entered. In non-diplomatic use, the authorities of a country may also declare a foreigner persona non grata permanently or temporarily, usually because of unlawful activity.

=== Israeli stamps ===
Kuwait, Lebanon, Libya, and Yemen do not allow entry to people with passport stamps from Israel or whose passports have either a used or an unused Israeli visa, or where there is evidence of previous travel to Israel such as entry or exit stamps from neighbouring border posts in transit countries such as Jordan and Egypt.

To circumvent this Arab League boycott of Israel, the Israeli immigration services have now mostly ceased to stamp foreign nationals' passports on either entry to or exit from Israel (unless the entry is for some work-related purposes). Since 15 January 2013, Israel no longer stamps foreign passports at Ben Gurion Airport. Passports are still (as of 22 June 2017) stamped at Erez when passing into and out of Gaza.

Iran refuses admission to holders of passports containing an Israeli visa or stamp that is less than 12 months old.

=== Biometrics ===
Several countries mandate that all travellers, or all foreign travellers, be fingerprinted on arrival and will refuse admission to or even arrest travellers who refuse to comply. In some countries, such as the United States, this may apply even to transit passengers who merely wish to change planes rather than go landside.

Fingerprinting countries/regions include Afghanistan, Argentina, Brunei, Cambodia, China, Ethiopia, Ghana, Guinea, India, Japan, Kenya (both fingerprints and a photo are taken), Malaysia upon entry and departure, Mongolia, Saudi Arabia, the Schengen Area, Singapore, South Korea, Taiwan, Thailand, Uganda, the United Arab Emirates and the United States.

Many countries also require a photo be taken of people entering the country. The United States, which does not fully implement exit control formalities at its land frontiers (although long mandated by its own legislation), intends to implement facial recognition for passengers departing from international airports to identify people who overstay their visa.

Together with fingerprint and face recognition, iris scanning is one of three biometric identification technologies internationally standardised since 2006 by the International Civil Aviation Organization (ICAO) for use in e-passports and the United Arab Emirates conducts iris scanning on visitors who need to apply for a visa. The United States Department of Homeland Security has announced plans to greatly increase the biometric data it collects at US borders. In 2018, Singapore began trials of iris scanning at three land and maritime immigration checkpoints.

== See also ==
- Visa policy of the United Arab Emirates
- Emirati passport

== Notes ==
How to apply for Thailand Visa for UAE Residents? - Emirates E-Portal
