= Visa policy of the United Arab Emirates =

Policy on permits required to enter the United Arab Emirates

Visitors to the United Arab Emirates must obtain an Online Visa through Smart Service or airlines unless they are citizens from one of the visa-exempt countries.

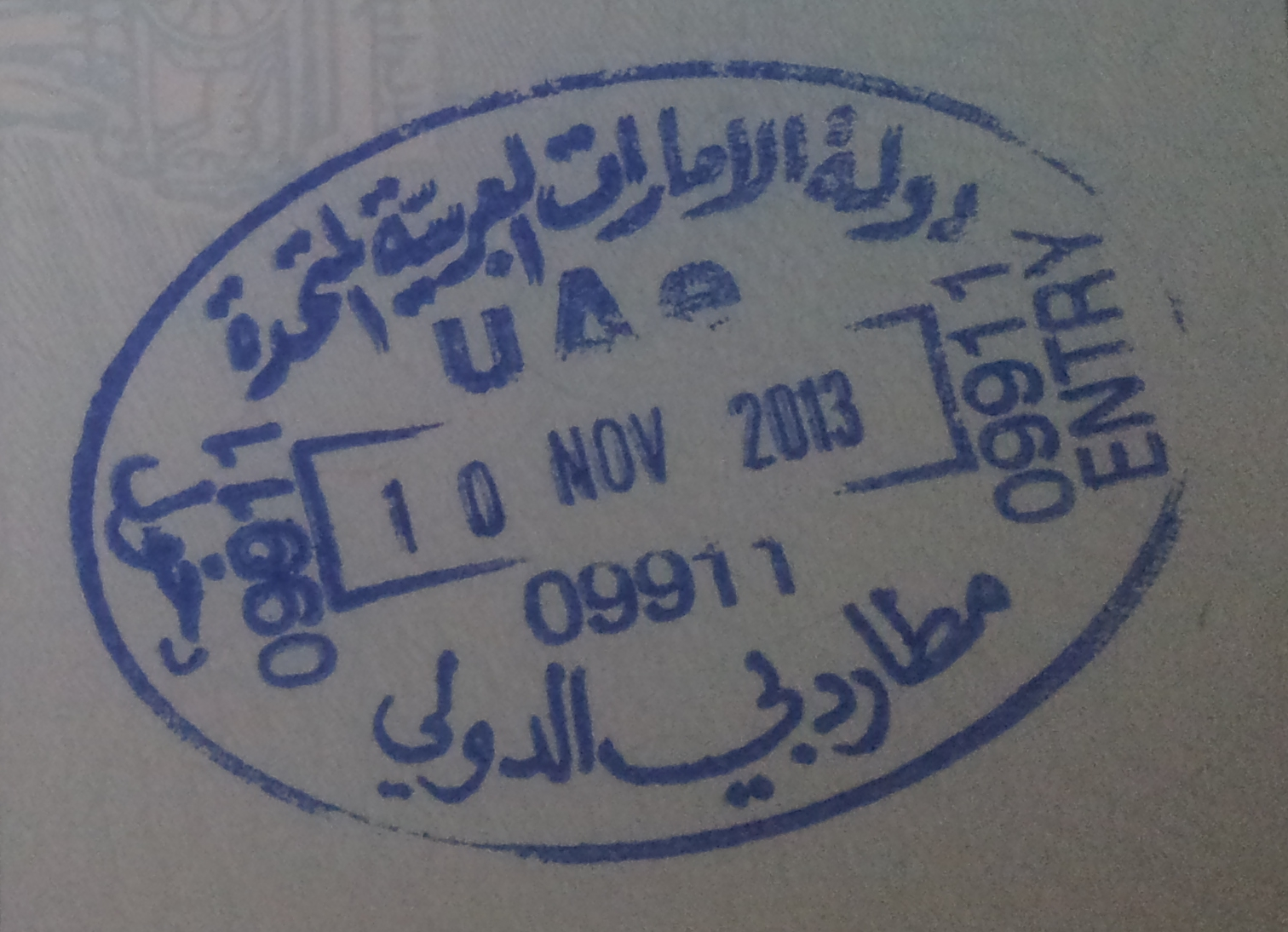
UAE entry stamp from Dubai International Airport

All visitors must have a passport valid for at least 6 months, or 3 months if holding a residence permit. Citizens of Gulf Cooperation Council countries need only show a government-issued ID card.

== Visa policy map ==
Visa policy of the United Arab Emirates United Arab Emirates Freedom of movement Visa not required (180 days) Visa not required (90 days) Visa not required (30 days) Visa on arrival if holding a valid visa issued by any European Union member state, Canada, the UK or the US, or a residence permit issued by any European Union member state, Australia, Canada, Japan, New Zealand, Singapore, South Korea, the UK or the US; otherwise, Online Visa Online Visa Admission refused

== Visa exemption ==
=== Ordinary passports ===
Citizens of the following countries and territories may enter the UAE without a visa for the following period:

Freedom of movement

- Bahrain^{ID}
- Kuwait^{ID} ^{1}
- Oman^{ID}
- Qatar^{ID}
- Saudi Arabia^{ID}

180 days

- Albania
- Mexico^{2}

90 days within any 180 days

- European Union member states (except Ireland)

- Argentina
- Armenia
- Australia
- Azerbaijan
- Bahamas
- Barbados
- Belarus
- Bosnia and Herzegovina
- Brazil
- Canada
- Chile
- China^{3}
- Colombia
- Costa Rica
- Ecuador
- El Salvador
- Fiji
- Georgia
- Guyana
- Honduras
- Iceland
- Israel
- Japan
- Kiribati
- Kosovo
- Liechtenstein
- Maldives
- Moldova
- Montenegro
- Nauru
- New Zealand
- Norway
- North Macedonia
- Papua New Guinea
- Paraguay
- Peru
- Russia
- Saint Vincent and the Grenadines
- San Marino
- South Korea
- Serbia
- Seychelles
- Singapore
- Solomon Islands
- Switzerland
- United Kingdom^{4}
- United States
- Uruguay

30 days (Note: The stay may be extended for an additional 30 days.)

- Andorra
- Brunei
- Hong Kong^{3}
- Ireland
- Kazakhstan
- Macau^{3}
- Malaysia
- Mauritius
- Monaco
- Mongolia
- Ukraine
- Uzbekistan
- Vatican City

_{ID – May enter with an ID card.}
_{1 – For holders of biometric passports without "Article 17" stamp.}
_{2 – Days above are for holders of ordinary passports only, non-ordinary passports are visa-exempt for 90 days within any 180 days period instead.}
_{3 - For Chinese citizens with People's Republic of China passports, Hong Kong Special Administrative Region passports or Macau Special Administrative Region passports only.}
_{4 – For British citizens only.}

Date of visa changes
- 6 May 2015: All European Union member states
- 16 July 2015: Seychelles
- 16 May 2017: Argentina
- 1 July 2017: Japan
- 16 December 2017: Chile
- 31 December 2017: Ukraine
- 16 January 2018: China
- 10 March 2018: Kazakhstan
- 31 March 2018: Montenegro
- 25 May 2018: Honduras
- May 2018: Saint Vincent and the Grenadines
- 29 April 2018: Uruguay
- 2 June 2018: Brazil
- 1 July 2018: Barbados
- 31 October 2018: Mexico
- January 2019: Paraguay
- 17 February 2019: Russia
- 6 May 2019: Serbia
- 16 August 2019: Paraguay
- 5 March 2020: Colombia
- 16 January 2021: Belarus
- 1 July 2021: Israel
- 20 April 2023: Albania
- 8 July 2023: Azerbaijan
- 6 November 2023: Bosnia and Herzegovina
- 28 December 2023: Mongolia
- 1 February 2024: Armenia
- 16 February 2024: Uzbekistan
- 22 February 2024: Kosovo
- 8 December 2024: Ecuador
- 29 May 2025: North Macedonia
- 18 September 2024: Australia, Brazil, Canada, China, Japan, Singapore, the United Kingdom and the United States (maximum length of stay extended to 90 days within any 180 days)
- 5 September 2025: Moldova

=== Non-ordinary passports ===
In addition to countries whose citizens are visa-exempt, holders of diplomatic or official/service passports of Algeria, Benin, Burkina Faso (30 days), Cameroon, Central African Republic, Colombia, Congo, Cuba, Egypt, Equatorial Guinea, Ghana, Grenada, India, Indonesia (30 days), Jamaica, Jordan, Liberia, Morocco, Rwanda, Serbia, Thailand (30 days), Tonga, Tunisia, Turkey, Turkmenistan, Vanuatu, Vietnam (30 days) and holders of diplomatic passports of Armenia, Chad, Congo DR, Ethiopia, Guinea, Kyrgyzstan, Mali, Mauritania, Niger, Senegal, Uzbekistan may enter the United Arab Emirates without a visa for up to 90 days (unless otherwise noted).

=== Future changes ===
The United Arab Emirates has signed visa exemption agreements with the following countries, but they have not yet been ratified or applied:

Country	Passports	Agreement signed on
Trinidad and Tobago	Diplomatic	29 September 2025
Ghana	All	6 August 2021
South Sudan	Diplomatic	23 April 2019
Burundi	All	4 January 2019
Kenya	Diplomatic	25 February 2017

== Visa on arrival ==
=== Substitute visa ===
Citizens of the following countries may obtain a visa on arrival for 14 days, which may be extended for an additional 14 days for one time only (AED 100) or may obtain a visa on arrival for 60 days straight away, which cannot be extended (AED 250) if holding a valid visa issued by any European Union member state, Canada, the United Kingdom or the United States, or a residence permit issued by any European Union member state, Australia, Canada, Japan, New Zealand, Singapore, South Korea, the United Kingdom or the United States:

- India

Citizens of the following countries may obtain a visa on arrival for 14 days, which may be extended for an additional 14 days for one time only (AED 100) or may obtain a visa on arrival for 60 days straight away, which cannot be extended (AED 250) if holding a residence permit issued by any European Union member state, Australia, Canada, Japan, New Zealand, Singapore, South Korea, the United Kingdom or the United States:

- Indonesia
- Kenya
- Philippines
- South Africa
- Thailand
- Vietnam

== Online Visa ==
Citizens of other countries have the option to obtain an online visa by 2 ways:

=== Smart Service ===
Visitors may obtain a visa online through Smart Service for Dubai or other emirates. Passengers must have a printed Online Visa confirmation.

=== Airline visa ===
Visitors may obtain a visa online through an airline if they are arriving on Air Arabia, Air Astana, Emirates, Etihad (and Air Baltic, Air Serbia, flydubai, Turkish Airlines and Indigo Airlines.

== Transit visa ==
Passengers on all international airlines may enter the United Arab Emirates for 96 hours after obtaining a transit visa at the airport.

The time difference between the 2 flights must be over 8 hours and the passenger must continue to a third destination.

Passengers also must have a hotel booking. This is not applicable to citizens of Afghanistan, Iraq, Niger, Syria, Somalia, Yemen.

All travellers in transit are exempt from entry fees for the first 48 hours; this short time may be extended for up to 96 hours for a fee of AED 50.

== Residency types ==
=== Blue Residency ===
Blue Residency is a new type of long-term residency in the United Arab Emirates, launched in 2024. It is granted to individuals who make exceptional contributions in the fields of environmental protection and sustainability, whether within the UAE or internationally.

=== Golden Residency ===
The Golden Residency is one of the leading initiatives of the Federal Authority for Identity, Citizenship, Customs, and Port Security. It offers eligible individuals the opportunity to obtain a long-term residency in the UAE, ranging from five to ten years, with automatic renewal and no need for a sponsor.

=== Green Residency ===
The Green Residency is a type of long-term residency permit, valid for five years and renewable, granted through self-sponsorship. It allows the holder to live and work without needing a sponsor within the country. This system is one of the UAE’s strategic initiatives to enhance the living and working environment and attract global talent, investors, and freelancers by providing a flexible long-term residency model that ensures greater stability and flexibility in living within the country.

== Admission restrictions ==
=== Iran ===
Due to 2026 Iran war, citizens of Iran are refused from entering or transiting UAE, even if not leaving the aircraft and proceeding on the same flight.

=== South Sudan ===
Citizens of South Sudan who hold a "business passport" are refused entry into the United Arab Emirates, but are allowed airside transit through the UAE without entry.

== Use UAE visa or residence permit for other countries ==
The UAE visa or residence permit is accepted as a substitute visa and this visa allows simplified entry into the following countries:

- Armenia – UAE residents may obtain a visa on arrival valid for up to 120 days.
- Azerbaijan – UAE residents may obtain a visa on arrival for a maximum stay of 30 days if they have a residence permit valid for at least 6 months from the arrival date.
- Egypt - UAE residents may obtain a visa on arrival for a maximum of 30 days.
- Georgia – Holders of UAE visa or UAE residents may enter Georgia without visa for 90 days within any 180-day period. UAE visa and/or a residence permit must be valid on the day of entry into Georgia.
- Kyrgyzstan – Citizens of Algeria, Bangladesh, Egypt, India, Jordan, Lebanon, Morocco, Nepal, Pakistan, Sri Lanka, Tunisia and Yemen who are UAE residents may obtain a short-term entry-exit visa under a simplified procedure.
- Kuwait - UAE residents may apply for an e-Visa.
- Morocco - UAE residents may apply for an e-Visa.
- Oman - UAE residents may enter Oman without a visa for up to 14 days.
- Philippines – UAE residents may apply for an e-Visa through the official Philippine eVisa website. They have to show their valid UAE residence visas when applying for e-Visas.
- Uzbekistan – UAE residents with a residency valid for at least 90 days may enter Uzbekistan without a visa for up to 30 days.

== Visitor statistics ==
=== Emirate of Abu Dhabi ===
Hotel guests (Note: Excluding Emirati citizens) checking in hotels in the Emirate of Abu Dhabi were from the following countries of nationality:

Country	2019	2018	2017
India	450,000	416,000	360,000
China	396,000	401,000	372,000
United Kingdom	267,000	278,000	261,000
United States	204,000	194,000	164,000
Egypt	184,000	169,000	160,000
Philippines	175,000	183,000	181,000
Saudi Arabia	163,000	168,000	152,000
Germany	128,000	142,000	131,000
Total	5,100,000	5,043,821	4,852,405

=== Emirate of Dubai ===
Most visitors (Note: International visitors who spend one night at least in Dubai including air, land & sea visitors, excluding United Arab Emirates residents, local Emiratis and aircrews & marines) arriving in the Emirate of Dubai were from the following countries of nationality:

Country	2022	2019	2018	2017	2016	2015
India	1,842,000	1,970,000	2,032,000	2,073,000	1,800,000	1,601,000
Oman	1,311,000	1,030,000	829,000	862,000	1,037,000	1,002,000
Saudi Arabia	1,216,000	1,565,000	1,568,000	1,529,000	1,638,000	1,542,000
United Kingdom	1,043,000	1,200,000	1,212,000	1,265,000	1,245,000	1,188,000
Russia	758,000	728,000	678,000	530,000	240,000	211,000
United States	590,000	667,000	656,000	633,000	607,000	602,000
Germany	422,000	560,000	567,000	506,000	462,000	461,000
China	n/a	989,000	857,000	764,000	540,000	450,000
Pakistan	n/a	501,000	513,000	598,000	607,000	513,000
Total	14,360,000	16,730,000	15,920,000	15,790,000	14,900,000	14,200,000

== See also ==
- Visa requirements for Emirati citizens
