= List of ski areas and resorts in Asia =

This is a list of ski areas and resorts in Asia and Eurasia.

== Armenia ==
- Ashotsk
- Jermuk
- Lernanist
- Tsaghkadzor Ski Resort

== Azerbaijan ==
- Agbulag Ski Resort
- Murovdag Winter Resort
- Shahdag Mountain Resort
- Tufandag Ski Resort

== China ==
- Beidahu, Jilin
- Xiaohaituo Alpine Skiing Field, Yanqing
- Yabuli Ski Resort, Heilongjiang
- Jikepulin Ski Resort, Xinjiang

== Georgia ==
- Bakuriani
- Gudauri
- Mestia

== India ==
Himachal Pradesh

- Kufri
- Manali
- Narkanda

Uttarakhand

- Auli
- Dayara Bugyal
- Mundali

Sikkim

- Lachung
- Yumthang

Jammu and Kashmir

- Gulmarg
- Pahalgam

Arunachal Pradesh

- Tawang

== Iran ==
- Alvares
- Dizin
- Fereydunshahr
- Pooladkaf
- Shemshak
- Tochal

== Israeli-occupied territories ==
- Mount Hermon ski resort

== Kazakhstan ==
- Akbulak
- Shymbulak
- Tabagan

== North Korea ==
- Masikryong Ski Resort, Kangwon Province

== Kyrgyzstan ==
- Chon Tash
- Karakol
- Orlovka

== Lebanon ==
- The Cedars
- Faqra
- Mzaar Kfardebian
- Laqlouq
- Zaarour

== Mongolia ==
- Sky Resort

== Pakistan ==
Azad Jammu & Kashmir

- Arang Kel

Gilgit Baltistan

- Astore Valley
- Fairy Meadows
- Karakoram
- Naltar ski resort
- Rattu
- Shimshal

Khyber Pakhtunkhwa

- Malam Jabba ski resort
- Nathia Gali

== Russia ==
- Dombay, Karachay-Cherkessia
- Rosa Khutor Alpine Resort, Krasnodar Krai
- Sheregesh, Kemerovo Oblast

== Syria ==
- Bloudan

== Tajikistan ==
- Safed Dara (formerly Takob)

== Turkey ==
- Bozdağ
- Davraz
- Elmadağ
- Erciyes Ski Resort
- Ilgaz
- Kartalkaya
- Kartepe
- Palandöken Mountain
- Saklıkent
- Sarıkamış
- Nemrut
- Uludağ

== Turkmenistan ==
- Kopet Dag

== United Arab Emirates ==
- Ski Dubai

== Uzbekistan ==
- Chimgan
