= Culture of Tehran =

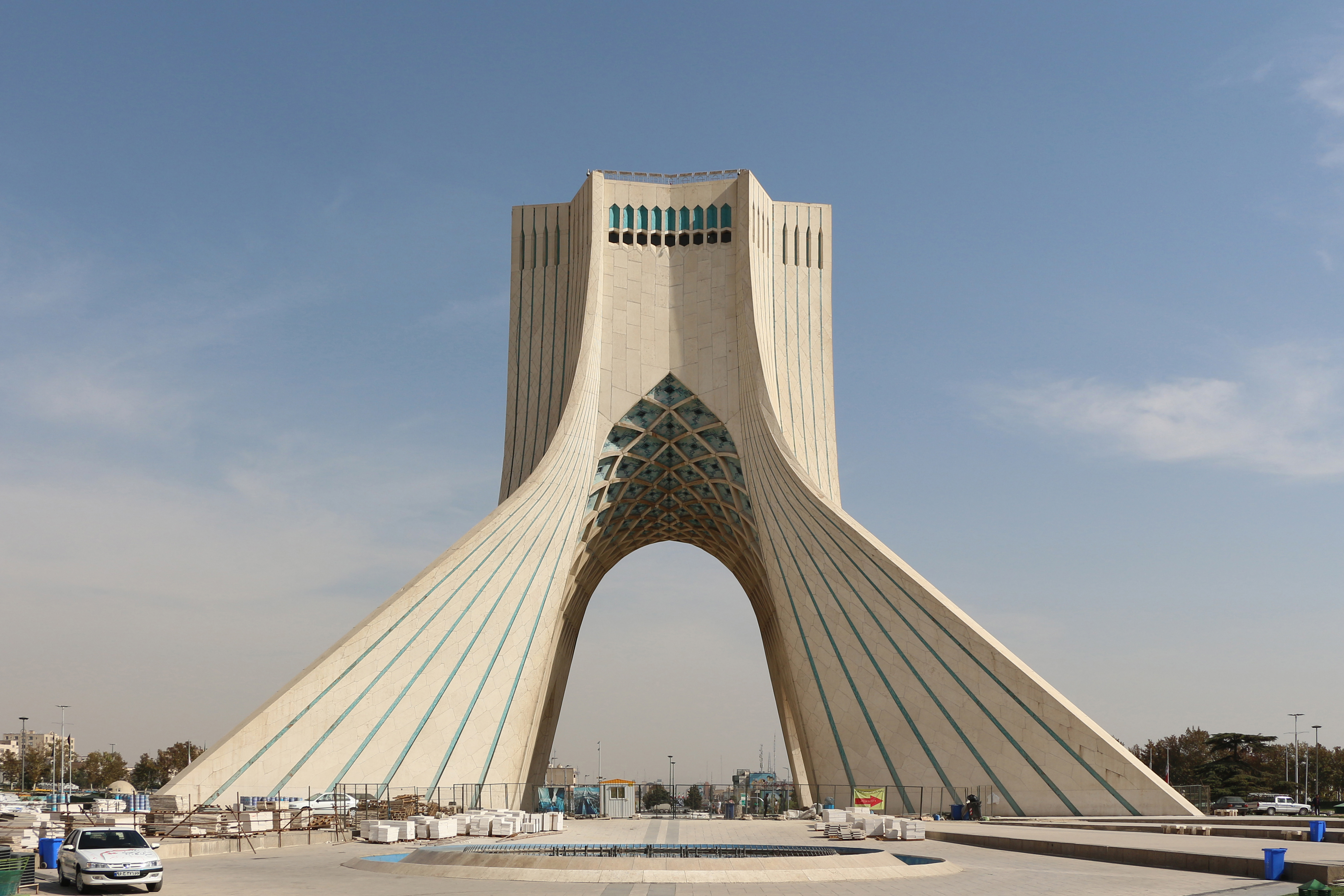
Azadi Tower, Main cultural icon of Tehran.

The culture of Tehran concerns the arts, music, museums, festivals, many Persian entertainments and sports activities in Tehran, the capital city of Iran. Iranian festivals are held throughout the year by the people of Tehran, which can be attractive to tourists.

There are several artistic, historic and scientific museums in Tehran, including the National Museum of Iran, and the Carpet Museum. There is also the Museum of Contemporary Art, which hosts works of artists such as Andy Warhol, Pablo Picasso and Van Gogh.

There are also numerous websites, news agencies and international media in Tehran.

== Architecture ==
The oldest surviving architectural monuments of Tehran are from the Qajari and Pahlavi eras. Although, considering the area of Greater Tehran, monuments dating back to the Seljuk era remain as well; notably the Toqrol Tower in Ray. There are also remains of Rashkan Castle, dating back to the ancient Parthian Empire, of which some artifacts are housed at the National Museum; and the Bahram fire temple, which remains since the Sassanian Empire.

Tehran only had a small population until the late 18th century, but began to take a more considerable role in Iranian society after it was chosen as the capital city. Despite the regular occurrence of earthquakes during the Qajar period and after, some historic buildings have remained from that era.

Tehran is Iran's primate city, and is considered to have the most modernized infrastructure in the country. However, the gentrification of old neighborhoods and the demolition of buildings of cultural significance has caused concerns.

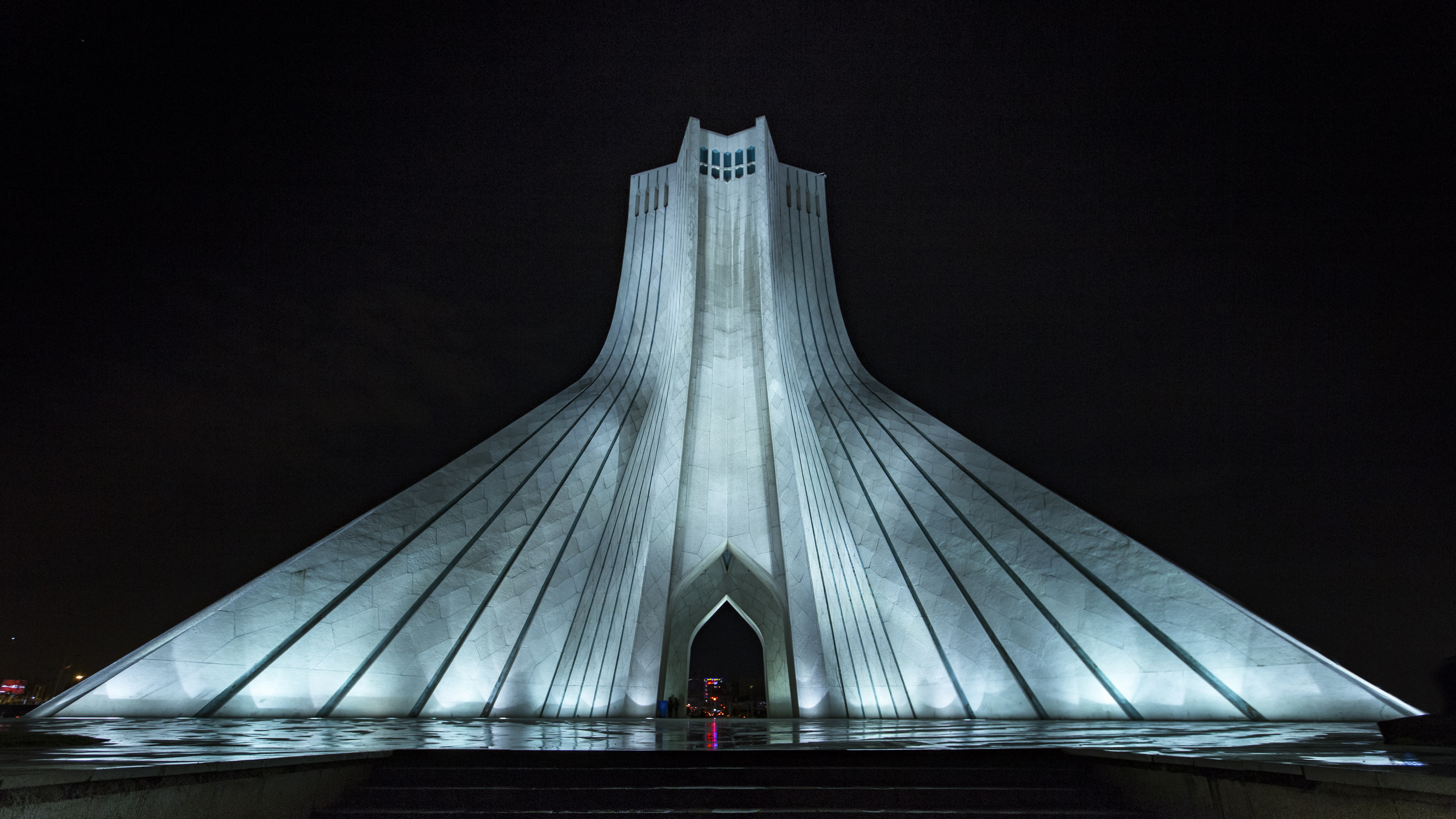
Azadi Tower

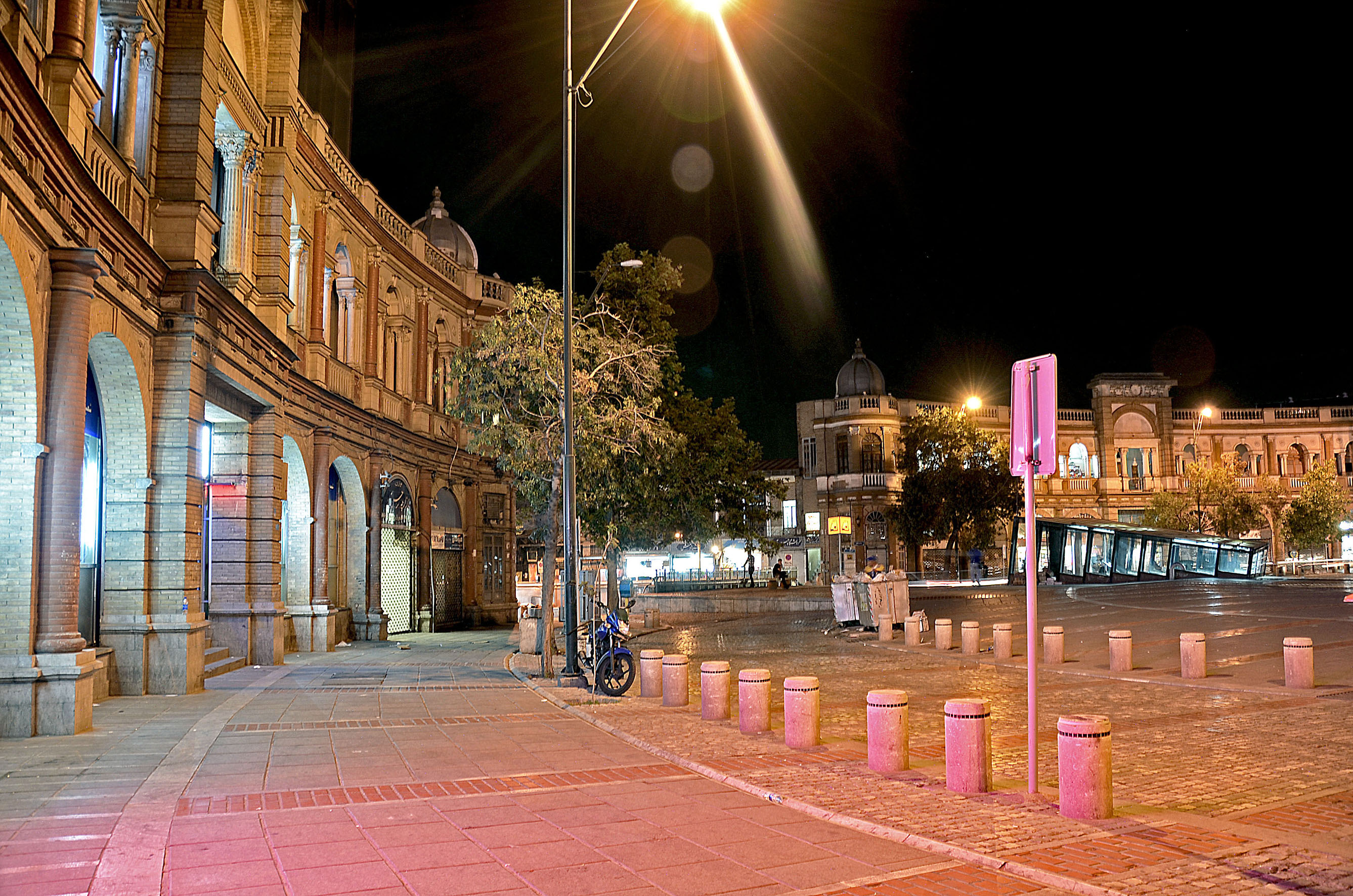
Hasanabad Square

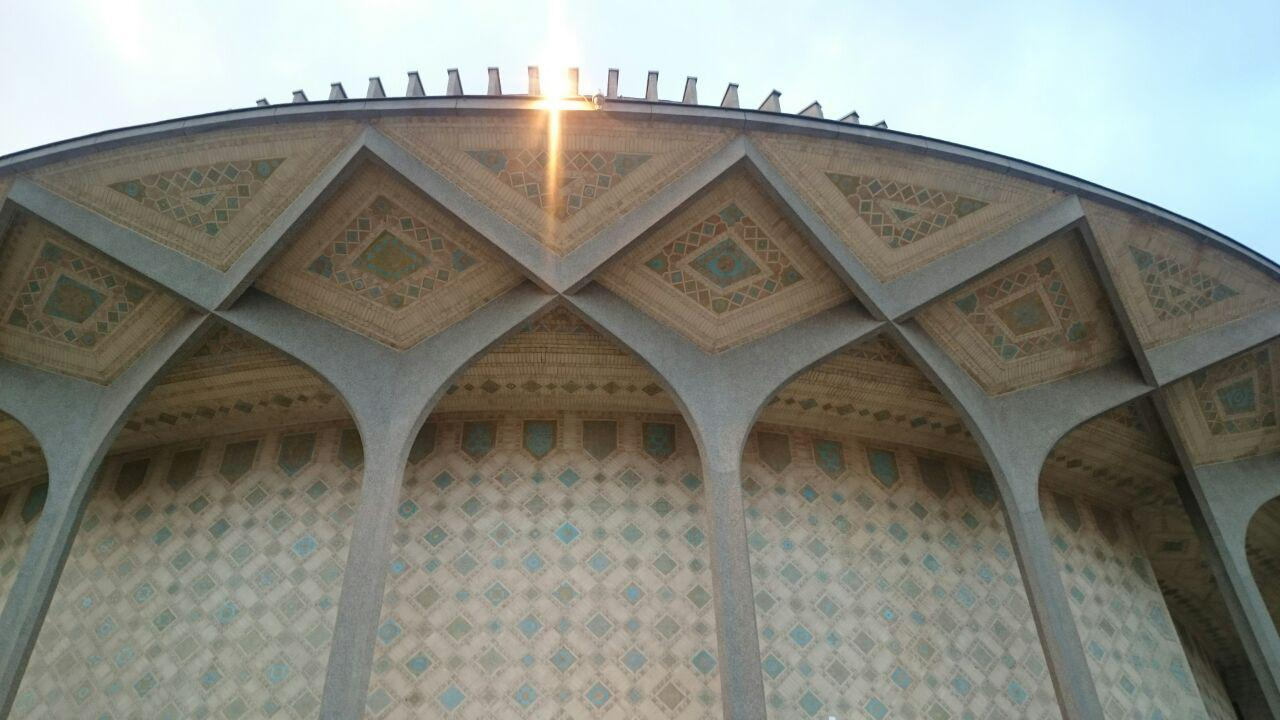
A view of the building of the City Theater of Tehran

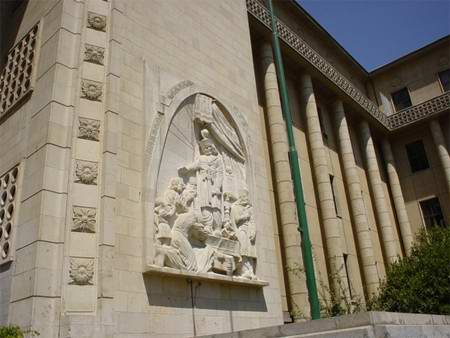
The Courthouse of Tehran

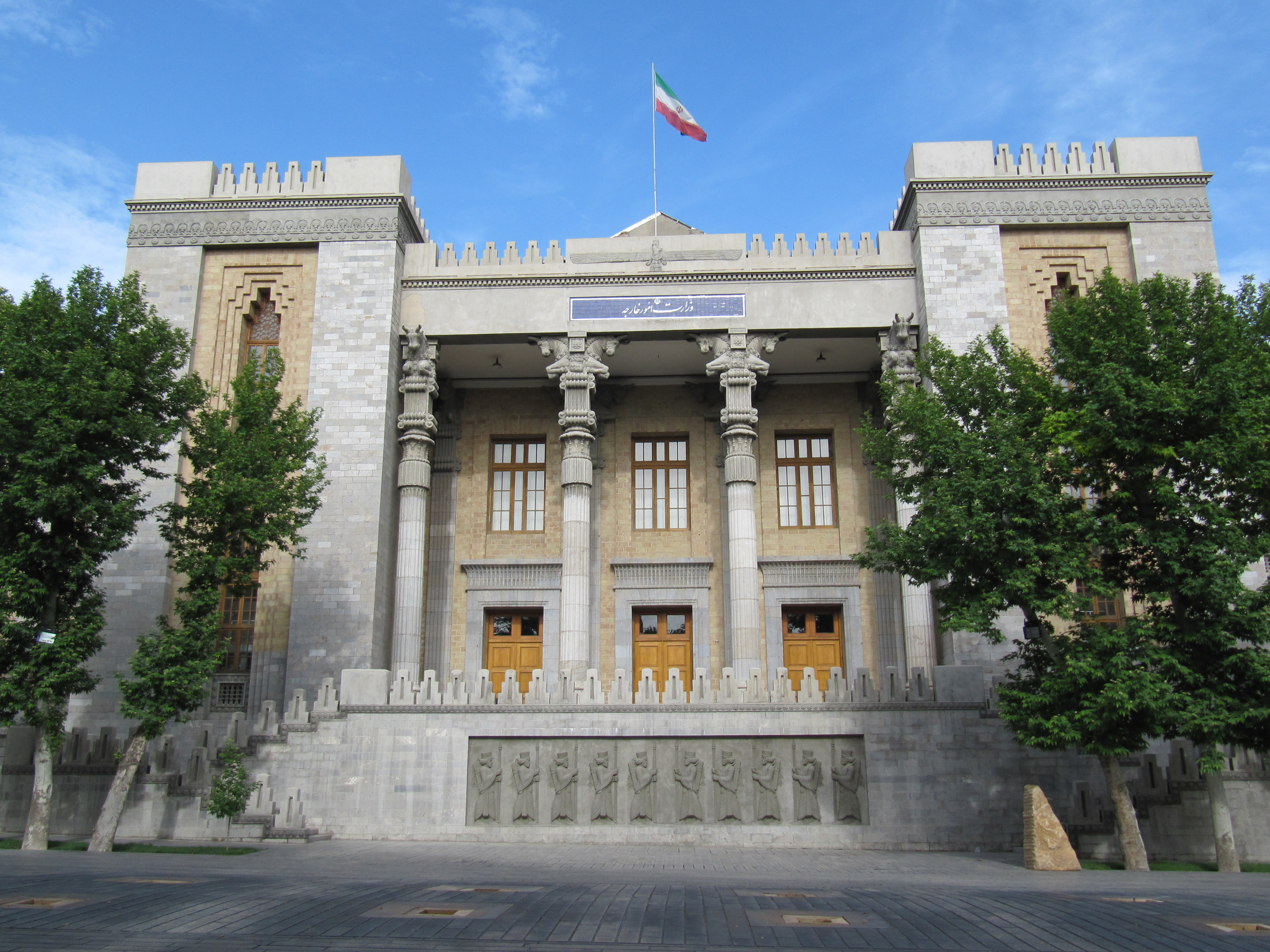
Police House,
the National Garden

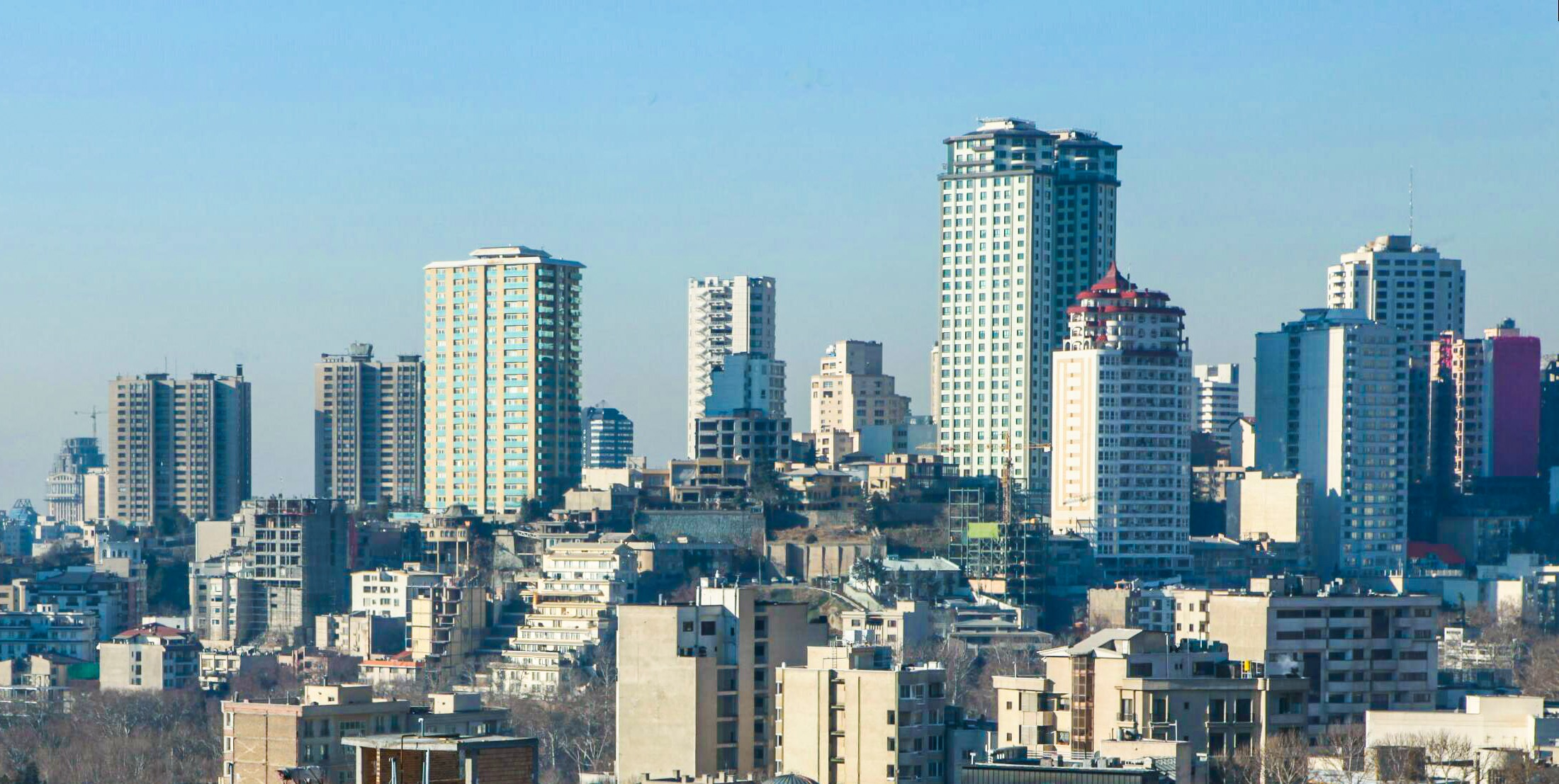
Qeytarie in February 2010

Previously a low-rise city due to seismic activity in the region, modern high rise developments in Tehran have been built in recent decades in order to service its growing population. There have been no major quakes in Tehran since 1830.

Tehran's International Tower is the tallest residential building in Iran. It is a 54-story building located in the northern district of Yusef Abad.

The Azadi Tower, a memorial built under the reign of the Pahlavi dynasty, has long been the most famous symbol of Tehran. Originally constructed in commemoration of the 2,500th year of the foundation of the Imperial State of Iran, it combines elements of the architecture of the Achaemenid and Sassanid eras with post-classical Iranian architecture. The Milad Tower, which is the sixth tallest tower and the 24th-tallest freestanding structure in the world, is the city's other famous landmark tower. Leila Araghian's Tabiat Bridge, the largest pedestrian overpass in Tehran, was completed in 2014 and is also considered a landmark.

== Theater ==
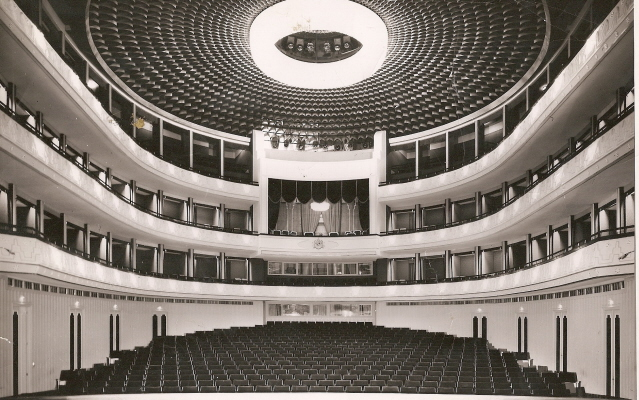
The Roudaki Hall, Tehran

Under the reign of the Qajars, Tehran was home to the royal theater of Tekye Dowlat, located to the southeast of the Golestan Palace, in which traditional and religious performances were observed. It was eventually destroyed and replaced with a bank building in 1947, following the reforms under the reign of Reza Shah.

Before the 1979 Revolution, the Iranian national stage had become the most famous performing scene for known international artists and troupes in the Middle East, with the Roudaki Hall of Tehran constructed to function as the national stage for opera and ballet. The hall was inaugurated in October 1967, named after prominent Persian poet Rudaki. It is home to the Tehran Symphony Orchestra, the Tehran Opera Orchestra, and the Iranian National Ballet Company.

The City Theater of Tehran, one of Iran's biggest theater complexes which contains several performance halls, was opened in 1972. It was built at the initiative and presidency of empress Farah Pahlavi, and was designed by architect Ali Sardar Afkhami, constructed within five years.

The annual events of Fajr Theater Festival and Tehran Puppet Theater Festival take place in Tehran.

== Cinema ==
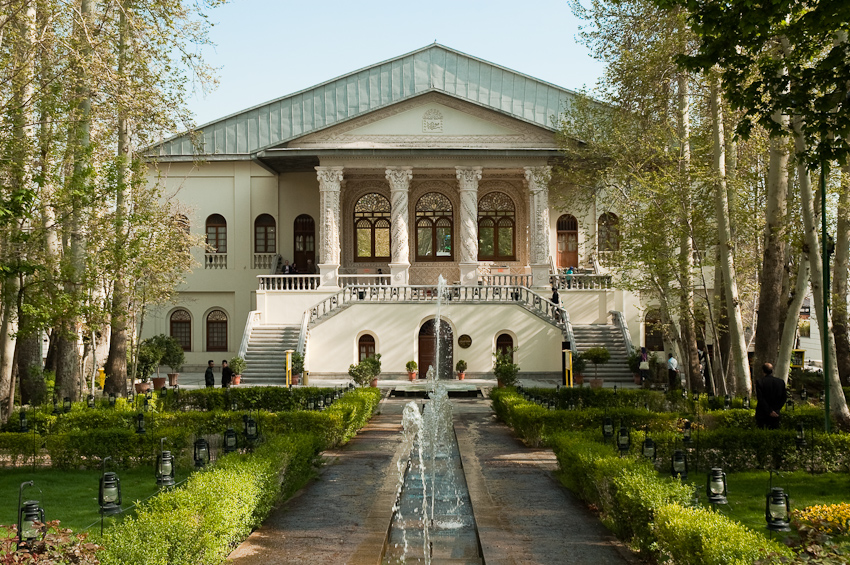
Ferdows Garden houses Iran's Cinema Museum.

The first movie theater of Tehran was established by Mirza Sahhafbashi in 1904. Until the early 1930s, there were 15 theaters in Tehran Province and 11 in other provinces.

In present-day Tehran, most of the movie theaters are located downtown. The complexes of Kourosh Cinema, Mellat Gallery and Cineplex, Azadi Cinema, and Cinema Farhang are among the most popular cinema complexes in Tehran.

Several film festivals are held in Tehran, including Fajr Film Festival, Children and Youth Film Festival, House of Cinema Festival, Mobile Film and Photo Festival, Nahal Festival, Roshd Film Festival, Tehran Animation Festival, Tehran Short Film Festival, and Urban Film Festival.

== Music ==
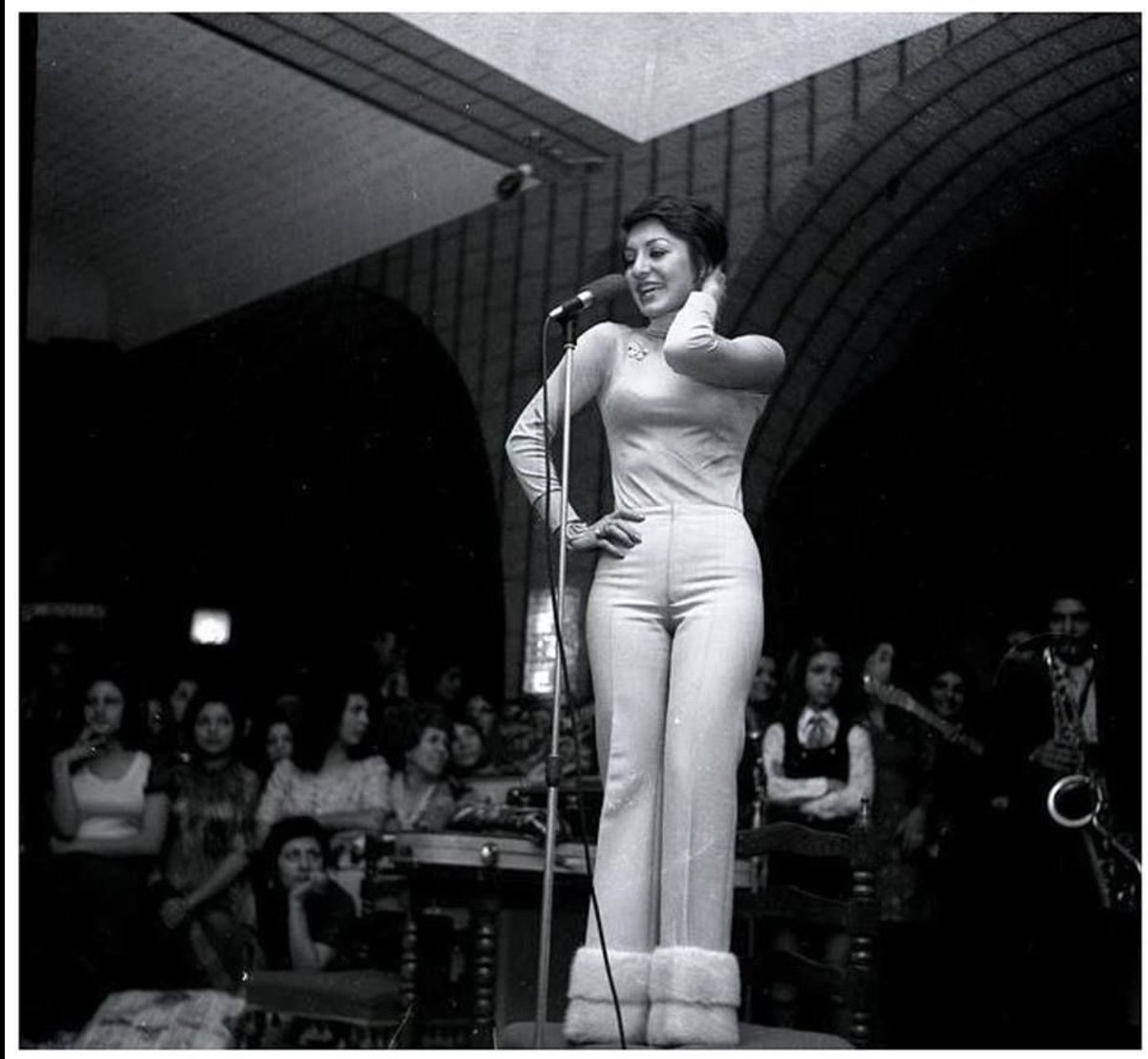
Googoosh performing in 1969

Tehran is also one of the most important cities in Asia for the recorded music industry. Tehran is home to two professional orchestras, including the Tehran Symphony Orchestra and Iran's National Orchestra. There are also several concert halls in the city. Many popular singers started their work in Tehran, including Dariush, Ebi, Leila Forouhar, Googoosh, Hayedeh and Mahasti.

== Museums and galleries ==
There are several artistic, historic and scientific museums in Tehran, including the National Museum of Iran, and the Carpet Museum. There is also the Museum of Contemporary Art, which hosts works of artists such as Andy Warhol, Pablo Picasso and Van Gogh. The Iranian Imperial Crown Jewels, are also on display at Tehran's National Jewelry Museum.

== Sports and athletics ==
Football and volleyball are the city's most popular sports, while aerobics, basketball, futsal, physical exercise, pilates and wrestling are also major parts of the city's sporting culture.

12 ski resorts operate in Iran, the most famous being Tochal, Dizin, and Shemshak, all within one to three hours from the city of Tehran.

Tochal's resort is the world's fifth highest ski resort at over 3,730 meters (12,240 feet) above sea level at its highest point. It is also the world's nearest ski resort to a capital city. The resort was opened in 1976, shortly before the 1979 Revolution. It is equipped with an 8-kilometre-long (5 mi) gondola lift that covers a huge vertical distance. There are two parallel chair ski lifts in Tochal that reach 3,900 meters (12,800 feet) high near Tochal's peak (at 4,000 m/13,000 ft), rising higher than the gondola's 7th station, which is higher than any of the European ski resorts. From the Tochal peak, there are views of the Alborz range, including the 5,610-metre-high (18,406 ft) Mount Damavand, a dormant volcano.

Tehran is the site of the national stadium of Azadi, the biggest stadium by capacity in West Asia, where many of the top matches of Iran's Premier League are held. The stadium is a part of the Azadi Sport Complex, which was originally built to host the 7th Asian Games in September 1974. This was the first time the Asian Games were hosted in West Asia. Tehran played host to 3,010 athletes from 25 countries/NOCs, which was at the time the highest number of participants since the inception of the Games. That followed hosting the 6th AFC Asian Cup in June 1976, and then the first West Asian Games in November 1997. The success of the games led to the creation of the West Asian Games Federation (WAGF), and the intention of hosting the games every two years. The city had also hosted the final of the 1968 AFC Asian Cup. Several FIVB Volleyball World League courses have also been hosted in Tehran.

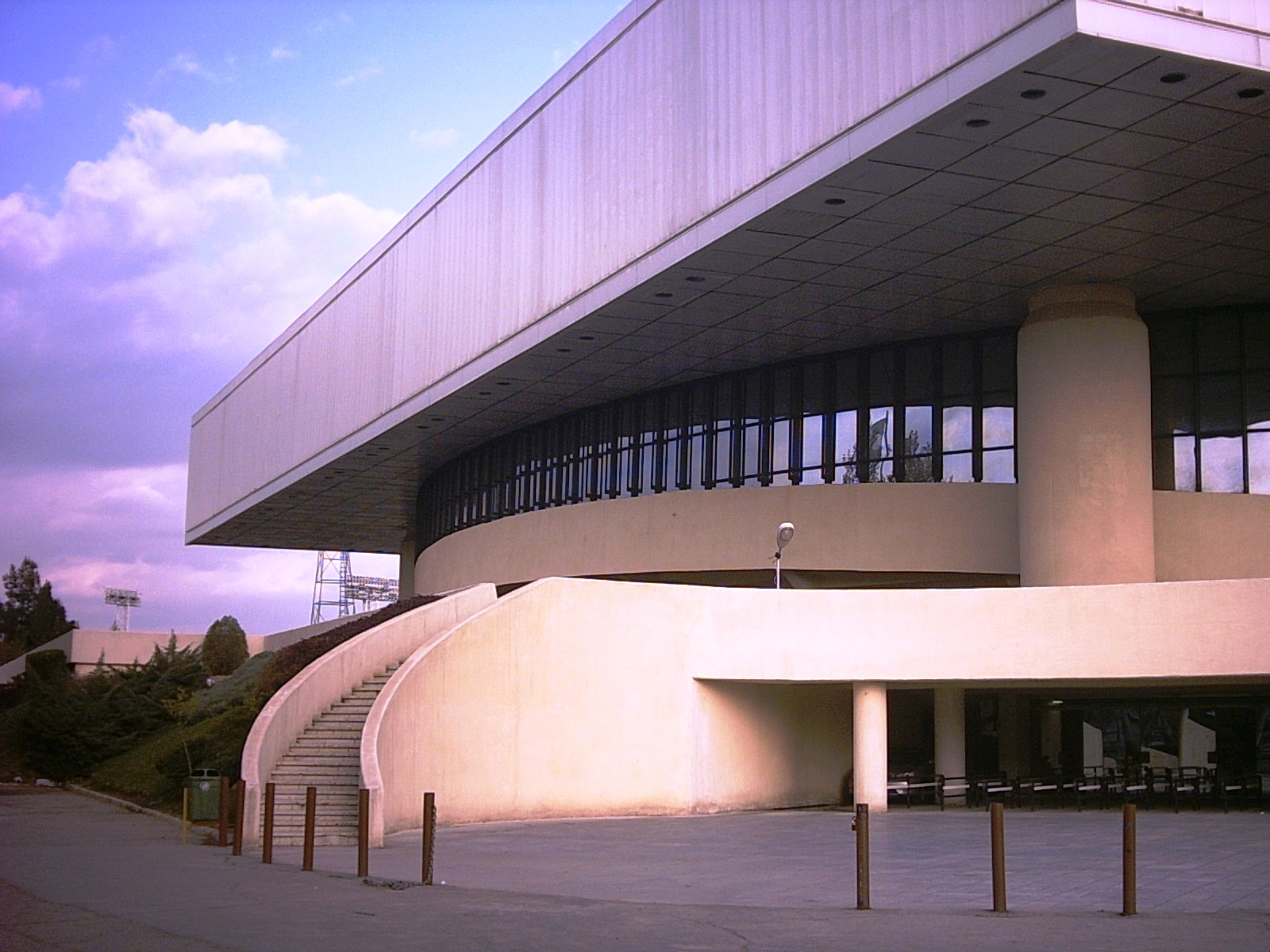
Azadi Indoor Stadium

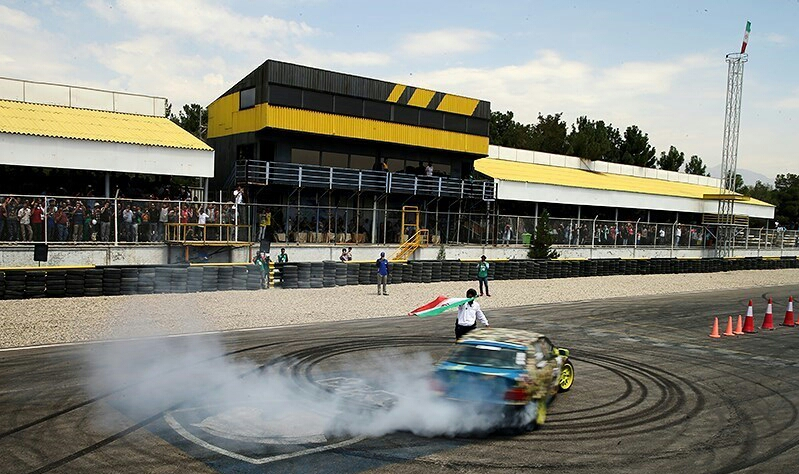
Azadi automobile Circuit

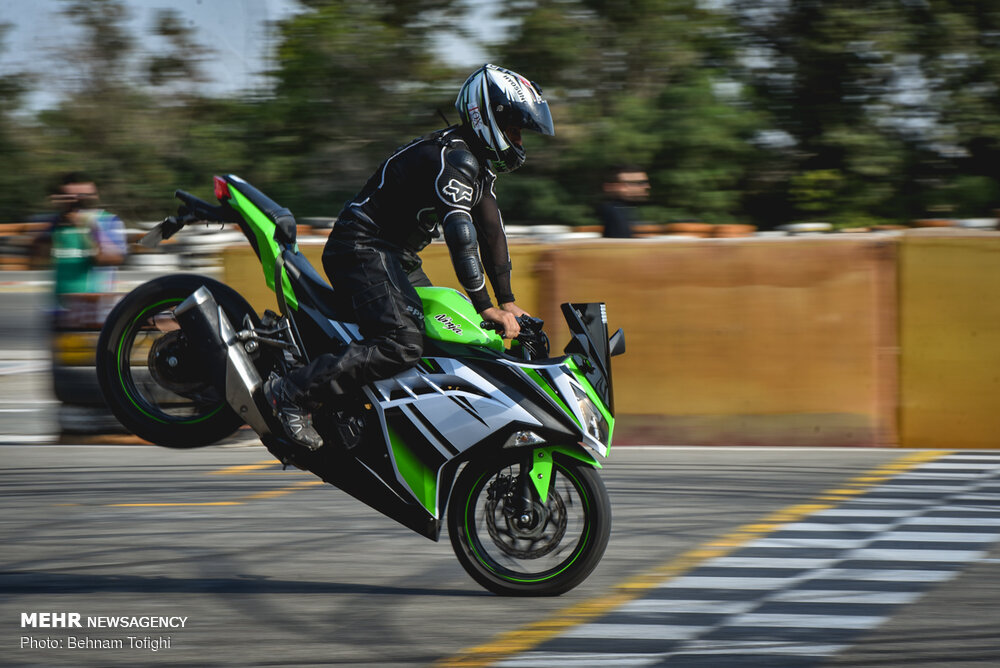
Azadi motorcycle circuit

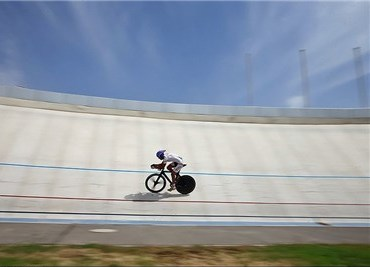
Azadi Velodrome

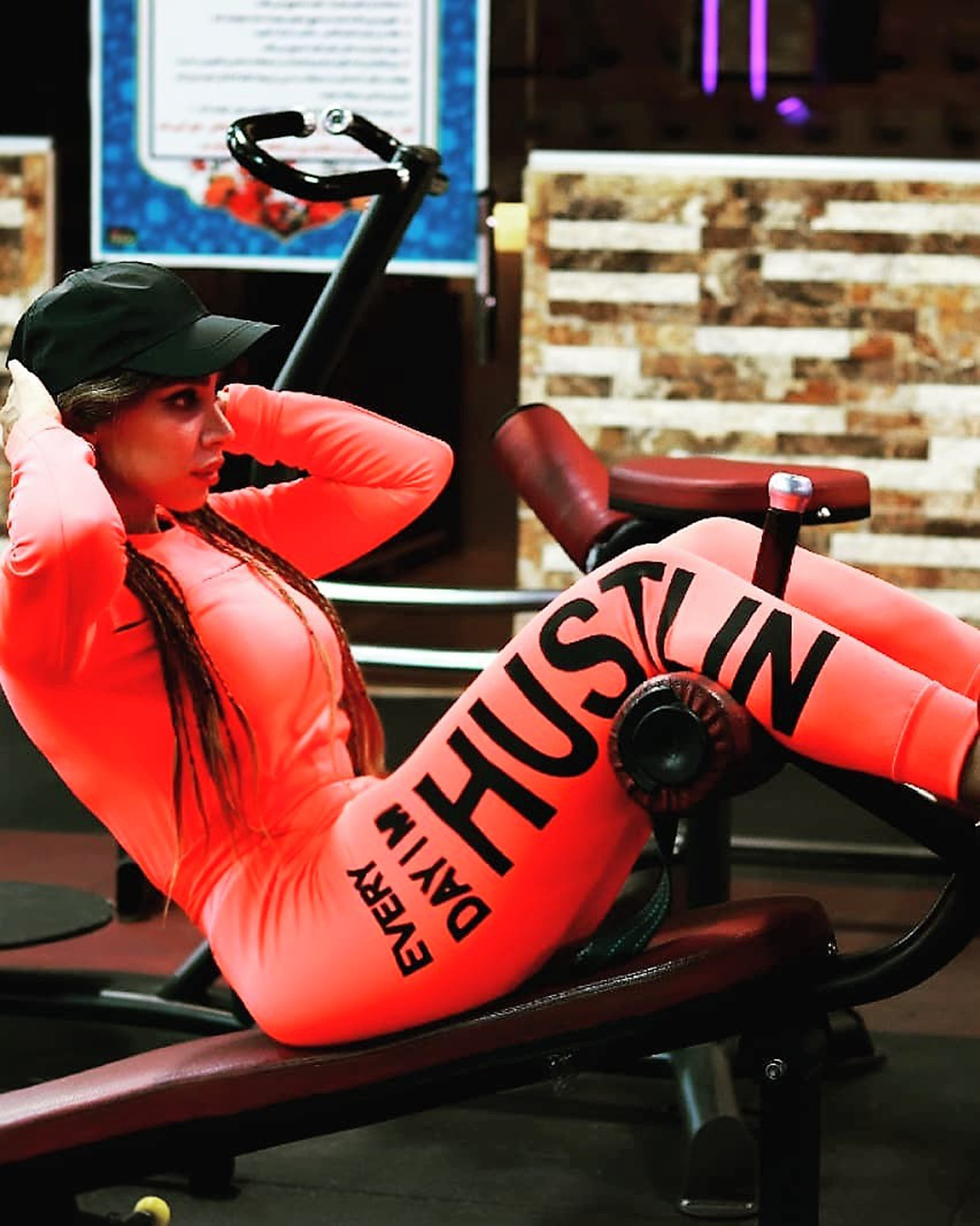
An Iranian woman doing physical exercise in a gym in Tehran

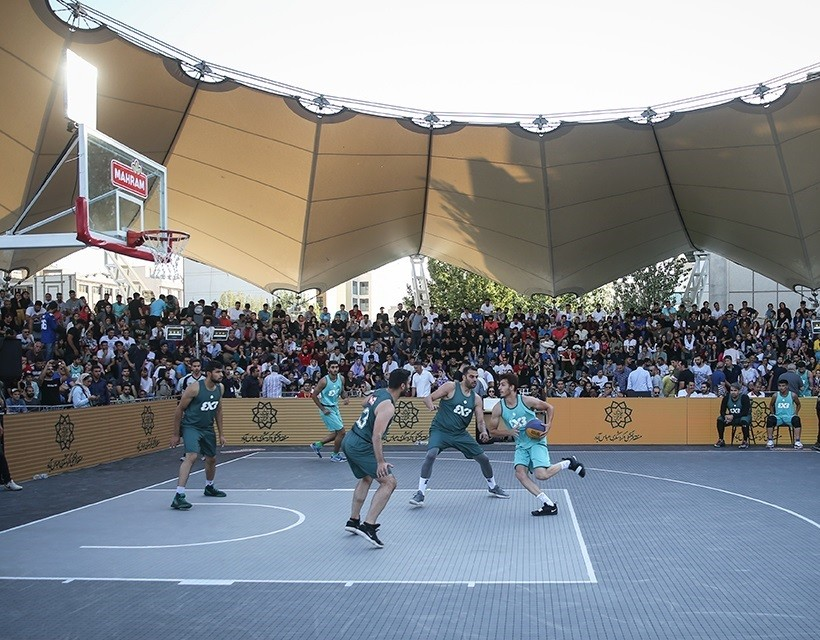
Streetball in Ab-o-Atash Park

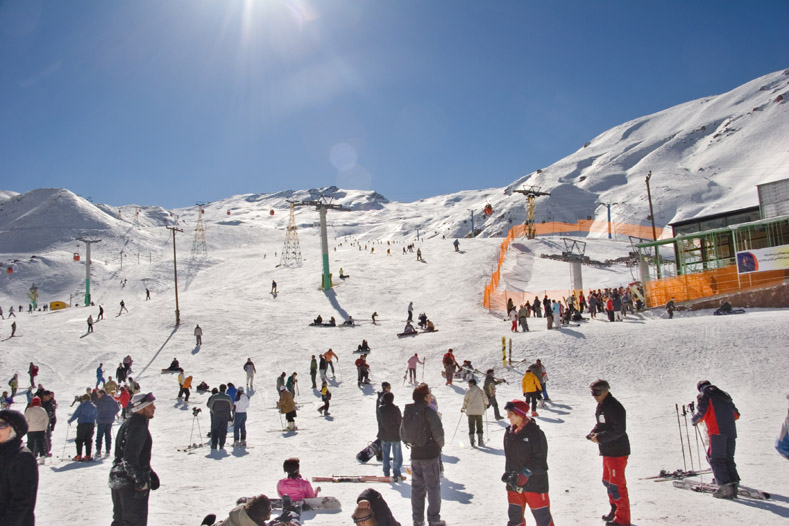
Dizin, Iran's largest ski resort, is located near Tehran.

=== Football ===
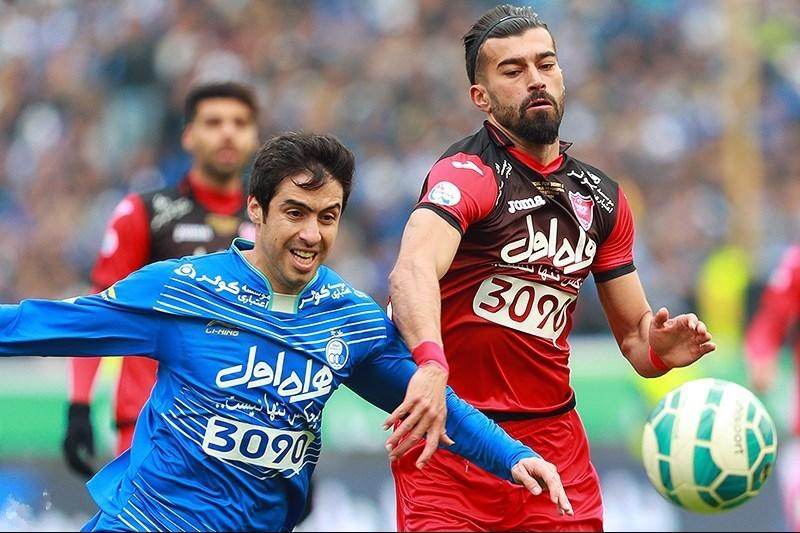
Tehran Derby, a football match between Esteghlal and Persepolis. This match was declared as the most important derby in Asia and 22nd most important derby in the world in June 2008 by World Soccer magazine.

The first football club of Tehran, named Iran Club, was founded in 1920 and dissolved within two years in 1923. Today, Tehran's oldest existing football club is Rah Ahan, which was founded in 1937. Persepolis and Esteghlal, which are the city's biggest clubs and two of the biggest clubs in Asia, compete in the Tehran derby. Tehran is also home to the football club of Ararat, a popular Armenian football team based at the Ararat Stadium.

=== Professional Clubs ===
Tehran's major clubs:

Club	Sport	Founded	League
Ararat	Association football	1944	Tehran Province League
Esteghlal	multisport club	1945	Iran Pro League (IPL)
Persepolis	multisport club	1967	Iran Pro League (IPL)
Paykan	multisport club	1967	Iran Pro League (IPL)

Smaller clubs based in Tehran:

Club	Sport	League
Baadraan F.C.	Association football	Azadegan League
Parseh F.C.	Association football	Azadegan League
Nirooye Zamini F.C.	Association football	2nd Division
Kaveh F.C.	Association football	2nd Division
Moghavemat F.C.	Association football	2nd Division
Oghab F.C.	Association football	3rd Division
Entezam F.C.	Association football	3rd Division
Naftoon F.C.	Association football	3rd Division

== Cuisine ==
There are many high-end restaurants and cafes in Tehran, both modern and classic, serving both Iranian and cosmopolitan cuisine. Pizzerias, sandwich bars, and kebab shops make up the majority of food shops in Tehran.

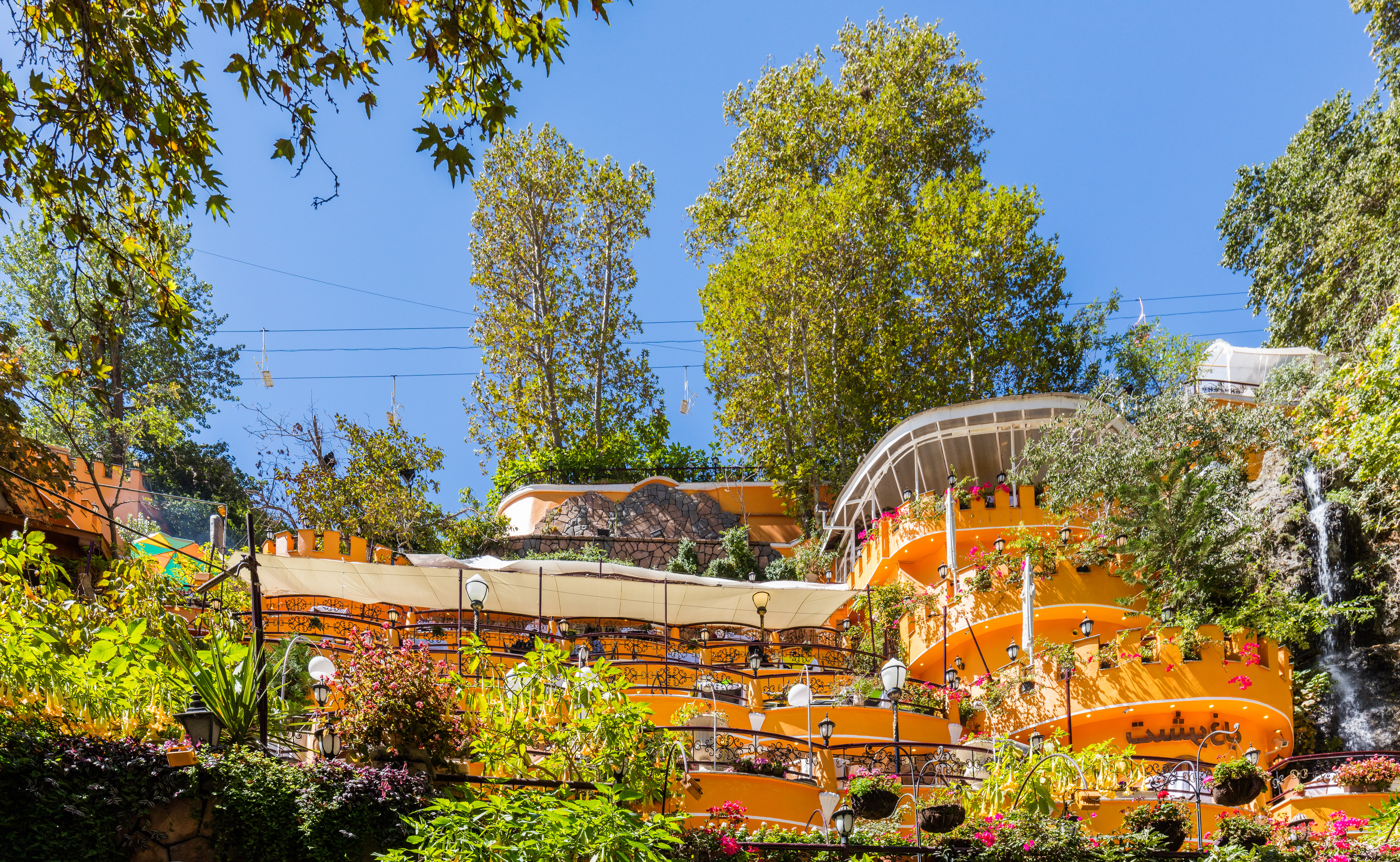
A restaurant in Darband

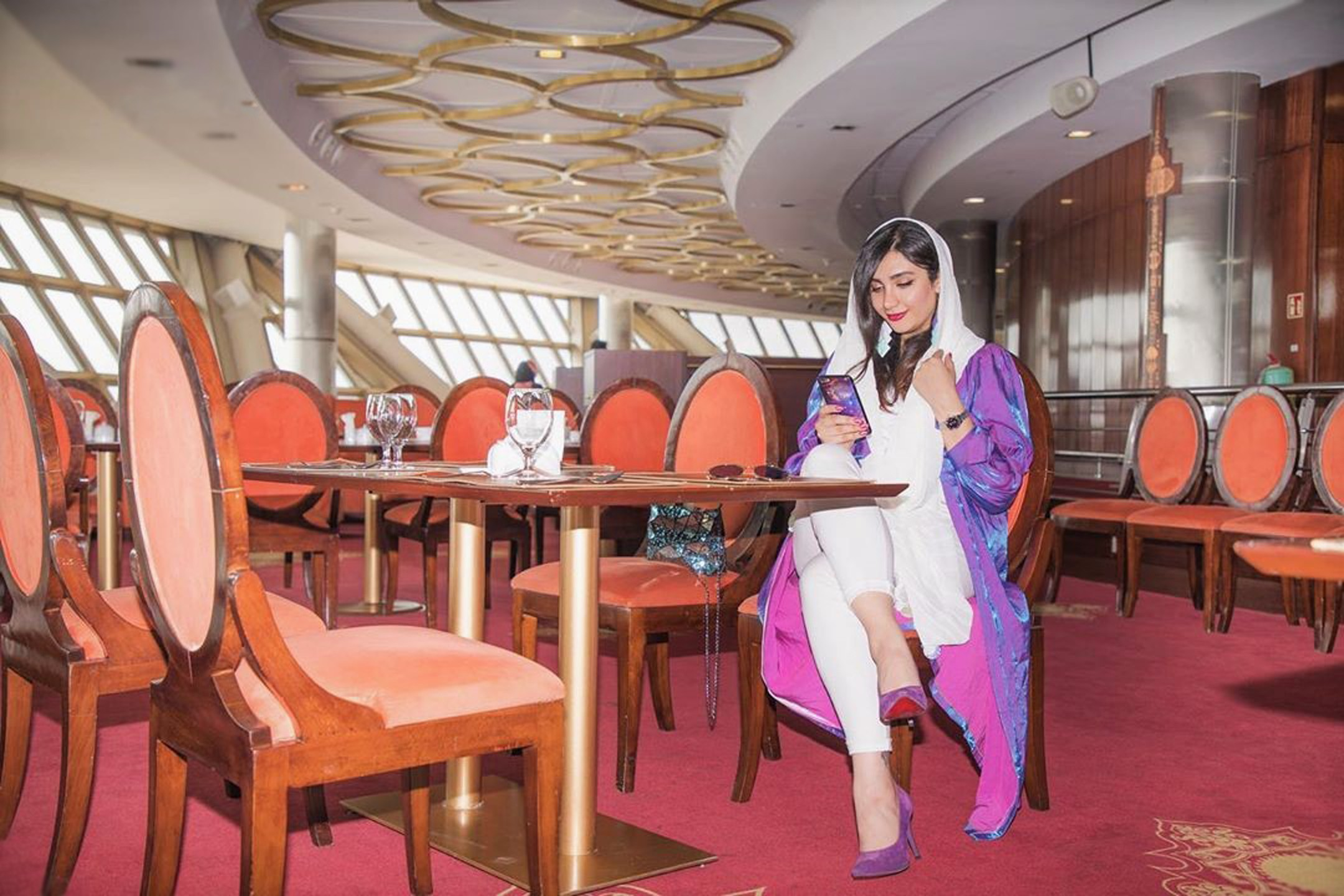
Milad Tower Revolving Restaurant

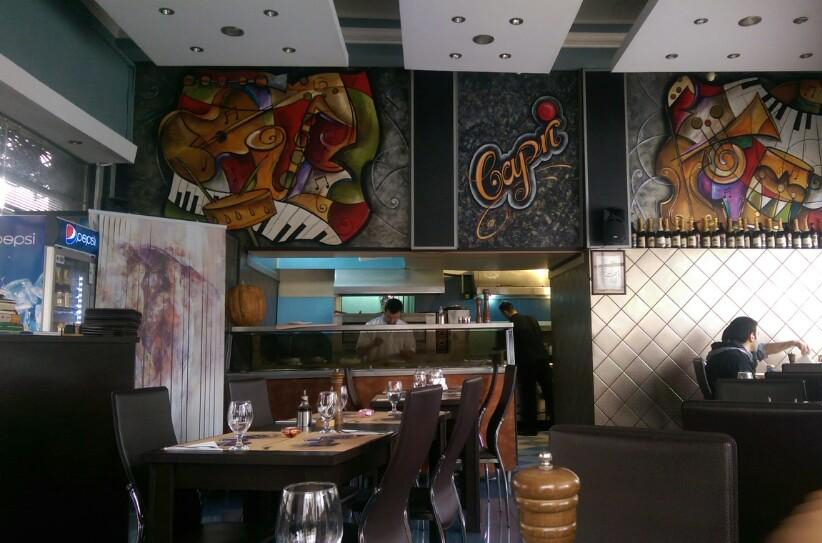
A pizzeria in Kamyab Street, Tehran

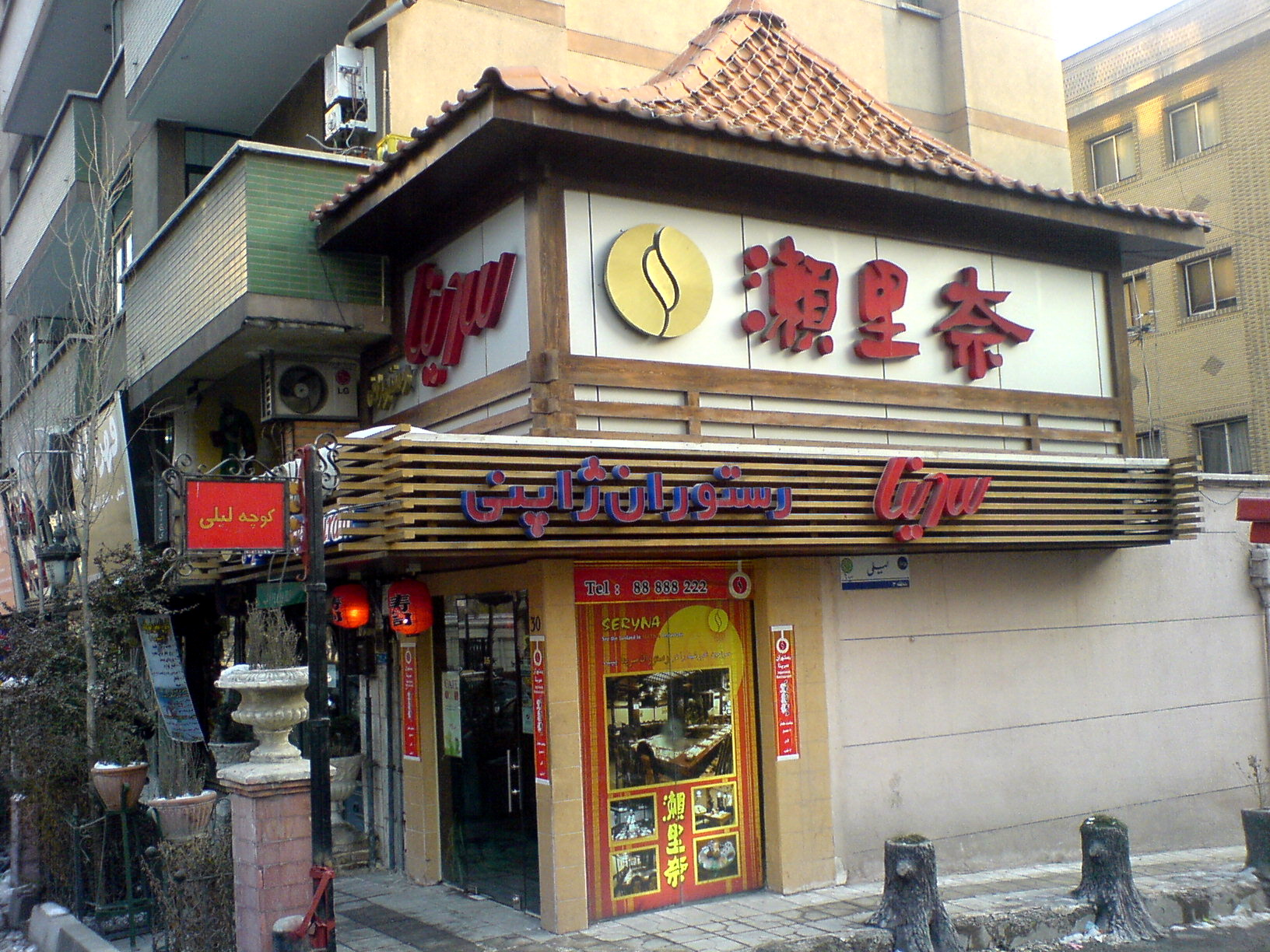
A Japanese restaurant in Tehran

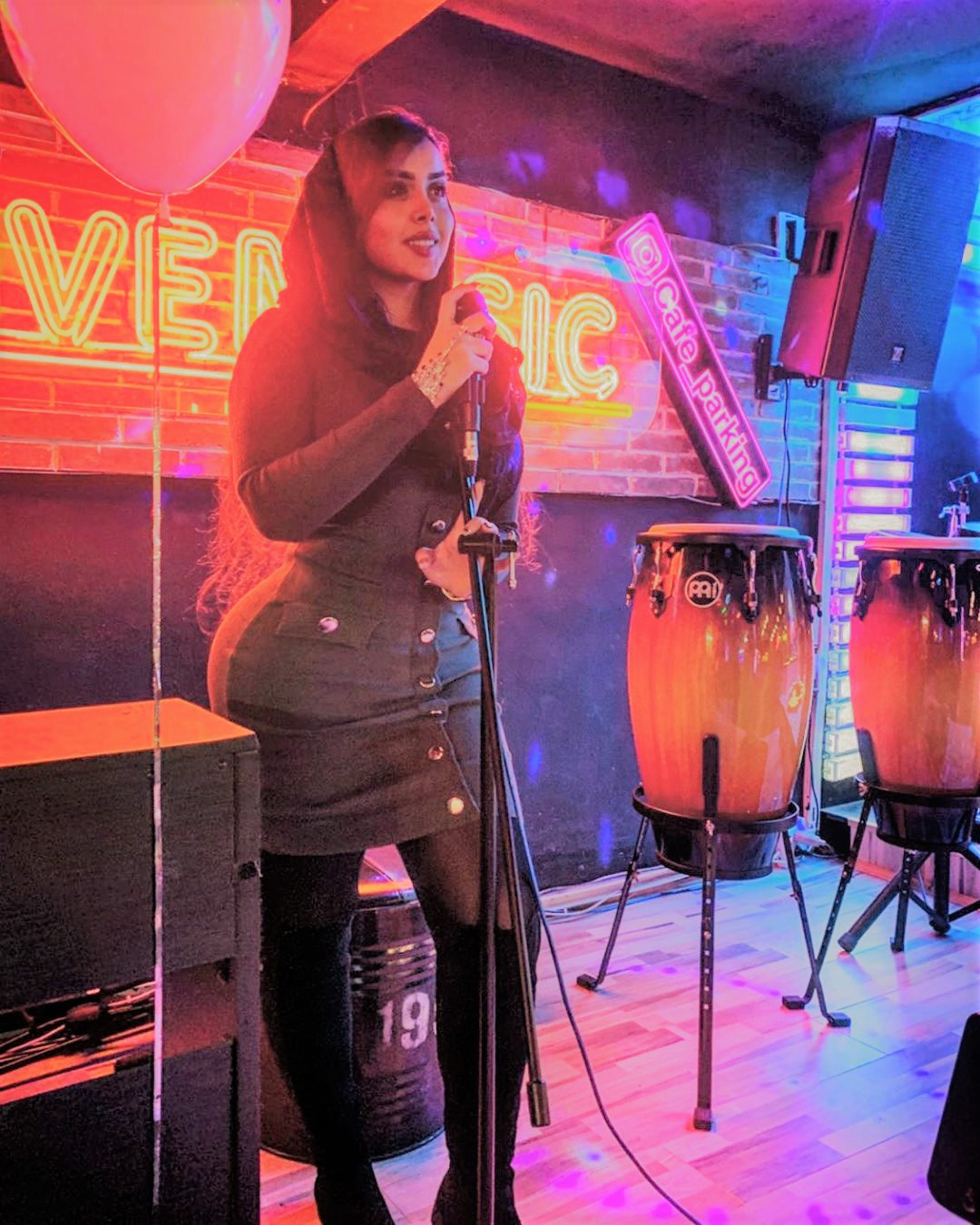
The Parking Café/Restaurant

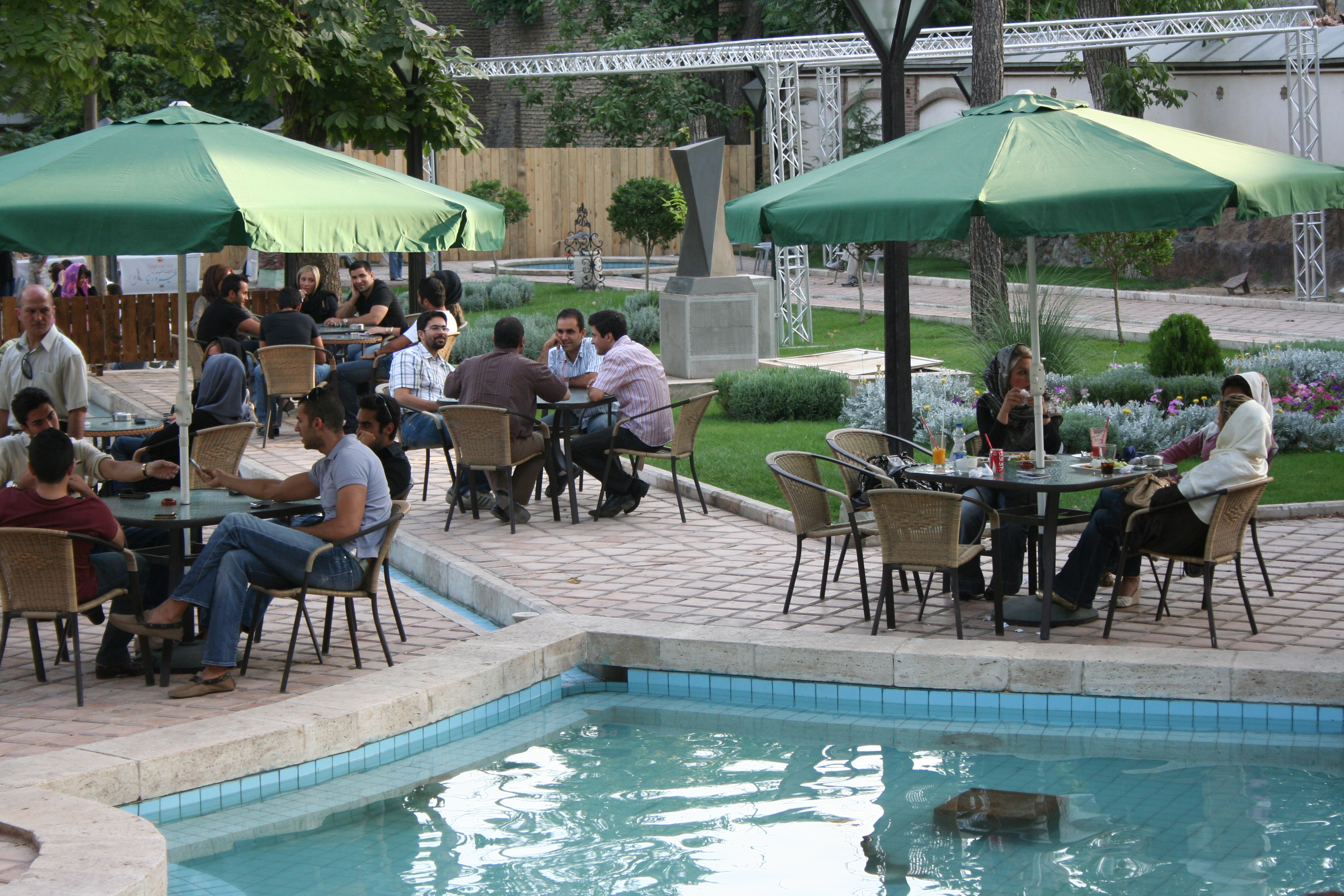
Shemroon Cafe, in Tehran's Iranian Art Museum

== Fashion ==
The city has produced many notable Iranian design houses and clothing companies. Fashion events are also held in some areas of the city. Many famous Iranian models were born in Tehran, including Nazanin Afshin-Jam, Cameron Alborzian, Sahar Biniaz, Elnaaz Norouzi, Shermine Shahrivar and Sadaf Taherian.

== Festivals and holidays ==
=== Iranian festivals ===
==== Nowruz ====
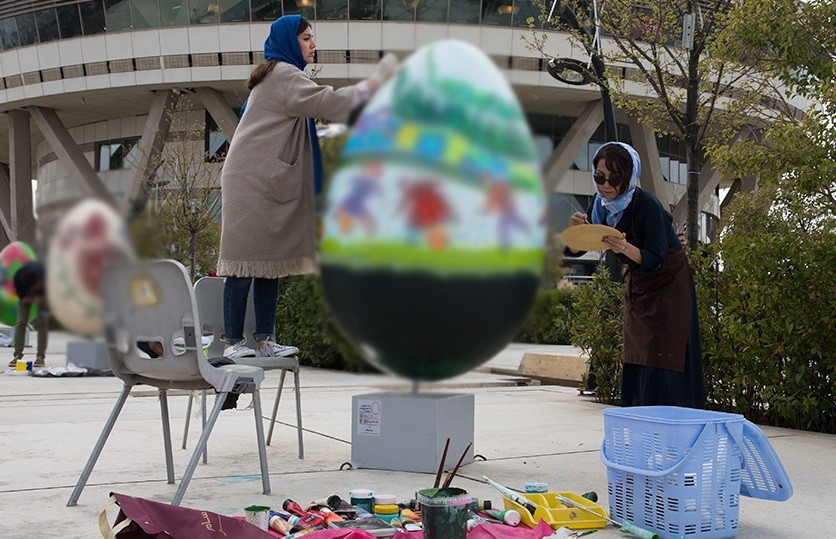
Painting huge eggs for Nowruz at Milad Tower

Iran's official New Year begins with Nowruz, an ancient Iranian tradition celebrated annually on the vernal equinox. It is enjoyed by people adhering to different religions, but is considered a holiday for the Zoroastrians. It was registered on the UNESCO's list of Masterpieces of the Oral and Intangible Heritage of Humanity in 2009, described as the Persian New Year, Tehran Municipality organizes festivals during Nowruz. During Nowruz, many tourists visit the city and Nowruz is one of the best times for visiting Tehran. Also, Tehran hotels offer discounts during Nowruz.

==== Chaharshanbe Suri ====
Chaharshanbe Suri is one of the most popular festivals in Tehran. On the eve of the last Wednesday of the preceding year, as a prelude to Nowruz, the ancient festival of Čāršanbe Suri celebrates Ātar ("Fire") by performing rituals such as jumping over bonfires and lighting off firecrackers and fireworks.

==== Sizdah Be-dar ====
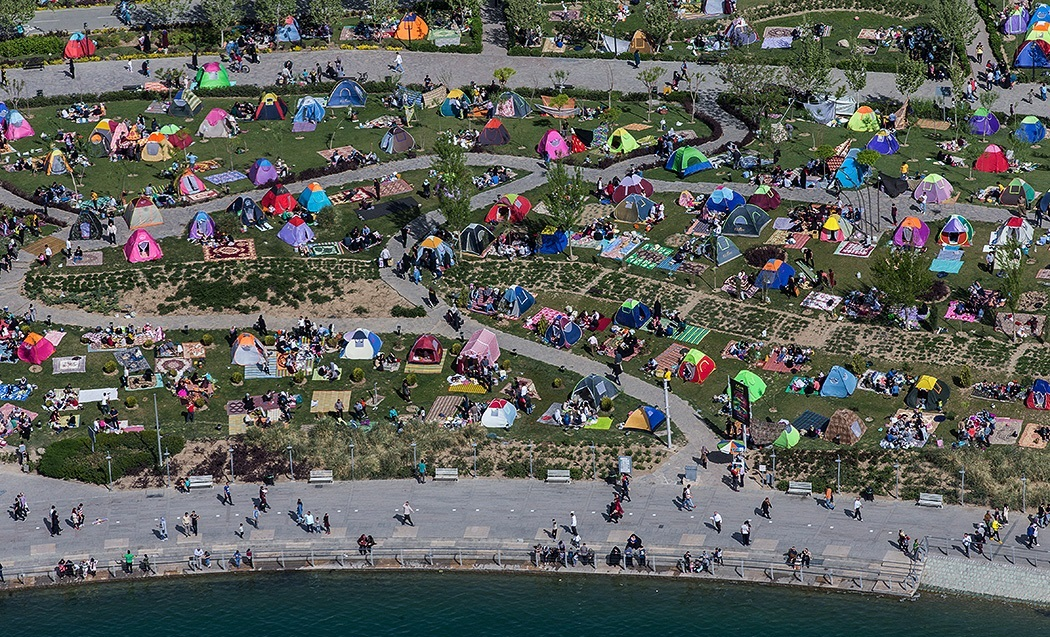
Sizdah Be-dar in Tehran. (2018)

The Nowruz celebrations last by the end of the 13th day of the Iranian year (Farvardin 13, usually coincided with 1 or 2 April), celebrating the festival of Sizdebedar, during which the people traditionally go outdoors to picnic. On this day, Tehran's people go to the city's parks and green spaces.

==== Yaldā Night ====
Yaldā, another nationally celebrated ancient tradition, commemorates the ancient goddess Mithra and marks the longest night of the year on the eve of the winter solstice (čelle ye zemestān; usually falling on 20 or 21 December), during which families gather together to recite poetry and eat fruits—particularly the red fruits watermelon and pomegranate, as well as mixed nuts.

==== Mehregan ====
Mehregan is an Iranian festival that also widely referred to as the Persian Festival of Autumn.

=== Religious holidays and festivals ===
Alongside the ancient Iranian celebrations, Islamic annual events such as Ramezān, Eid e Fetr, and Ruz e Āšurā are marked by the country's large Muslim population, Christian traditions such as Noel, Čelle ye Ruze, and Eid e Pāk are observed by the Christian communities, Jewish traditions such as Purim, Hanukā, and Eid e Fatir (Pesah) are observed by the Jewish communities, and Zoroastrian traditions such as Sade and Mehrgān are observed by the Zoroastrians.

=== Industrial and art festivals ===
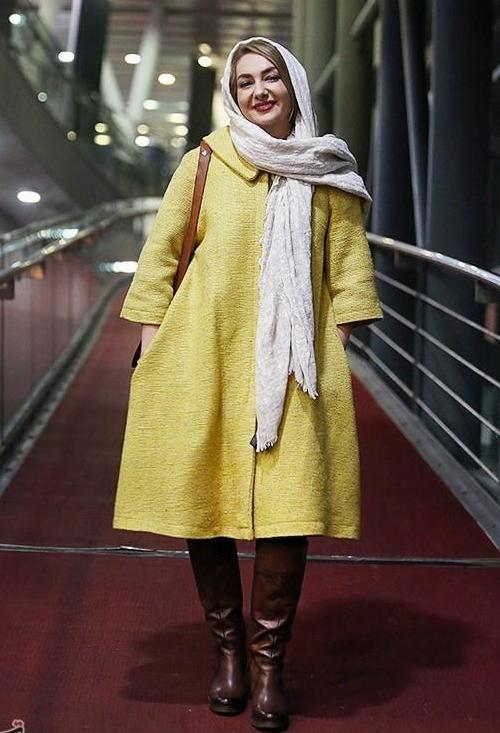
Hanieh Tavassoli at 35th Fajr International Film Festival

There are many fairs and festivals in Tehran that are the best of their kind in the Middle East. Some Tehran festivals are newly established such as Tehran Auto Show.

== Graffiti ==
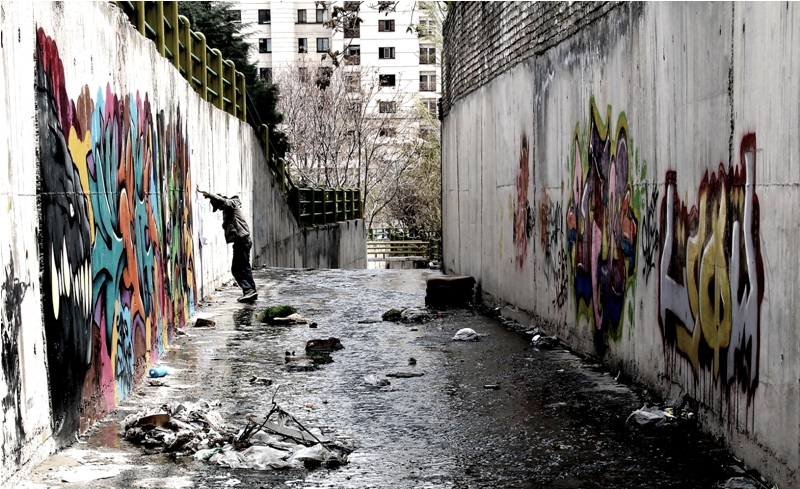
A scene from the 2016 documentary film Writing on the City, showing graffiti in Tehran's Sa'adat Abad

Many styles of graffiti are seen in Tehran. Some are mainly political and revolutionary slogans painted by governmental organizations, and some are works of art by ordinary citizens, representing their views on both social and political issues. However, unsanctioned street art is forbidden in Iran, and such works are usually short-lived.

During the 2009 Iranian presidential election protests, many graffiti works were created by people supporting the Green Movement. They were removed from the walls by the paramilitary Basij forces.

In recent years, Tehran Municipality has been using graffiti in order to beautify the city.

Several graffiti festivals have also taken place in Tehran, including the one organized by the Tehran University of Art in October 2014.
