= List of ski areas and resorts in Iran =

This is a list of ski areas and resorts in Iran. This list contains 25 ski resorts.

== Tehran province ==
- Darbandsar Ski Resort
- Tochal
- Abali
- Shemshak

== Alborz province ==
- Dizin
- Khor Ski Resort

== Ardabil province ==
- Alvares
- Fandoqlu Grass Skiing Resort

== Markazi province ==
- Shazand Ski Resort

== Fars province ==
- Tributbadani Fars Ski Resort
- Pooladkaf

== West Azerbaijan province ==
- Khoshaku

== East Azerbaijan province ==
- Sahand Ski Resort
- Yam Ski Resort

== Kurdistan province ==
- Nassar Ski Resort
- Saqqez Ski Resort

== Chaharmahal and Bakhtiari province ==
- Kuhrang (Chelgerd) Ski Resort

== Kohgiluyeh and Boyer-Ahmad province ==
- Kakan

== Hamedan province ==
- Tarik-darreh

== Semnan province ==
- Shahmirzad Ski Resort

== Razavi Khorasan province ==
- Shirbad

== Isfahan province ==
- Fereydunshahr Ski Resort

== Qazvin province ==
- Kamaan

== Zanjan province ==
- Papaei Ski Resort

== See also ==
- List of ski areas and resorts in Asia
