= Alvares (ski resort) =

Iranian ski area

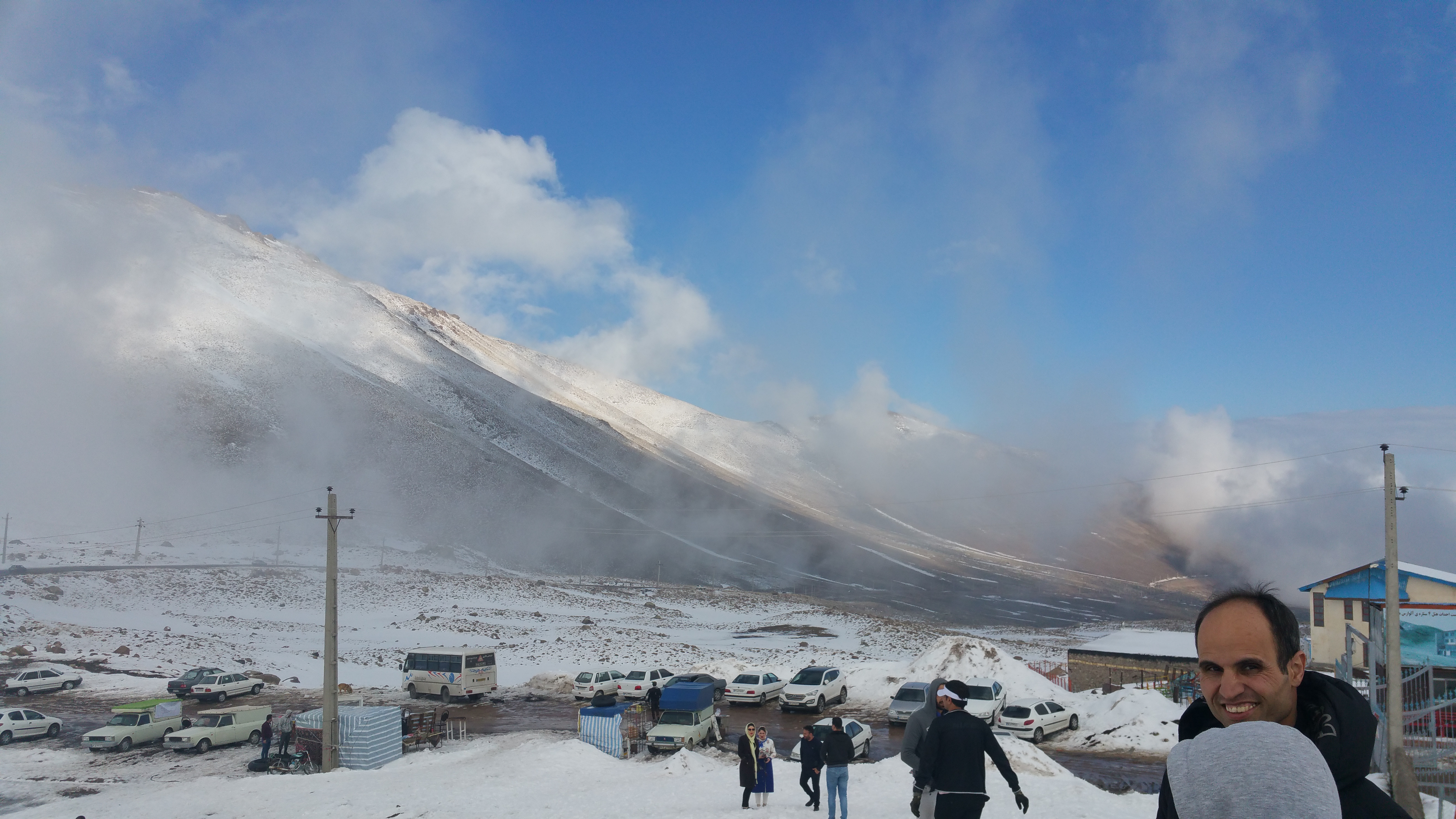
- Hills around Alvares Ski Resort.

- Location within Iran
- Location: Alvares, Iran
- Coordinates: 38°20′00″N 47°56′50″E
- Top elevation: 3,200 m (10,500 ft)
- Base elevation: 3,000 m (9,800 ft)
- Trails: 1
- Lift system: 1 chairlifts 1 Surface lifts
- Snowmaking: No
- Night skiing: No

Alvares is a ski resort located 24 kilometres from the city of Sareyn in the Iranian province of Ardabil. Alvares is the second standard ski resort in Iran after Dizin. The resort is at an elevation of roughly 3,200 meters above sea level.

== See also ==
- List of ski areas and resorts in Iran
