= Shemshak (ski resort) =

Ski resort in Iran

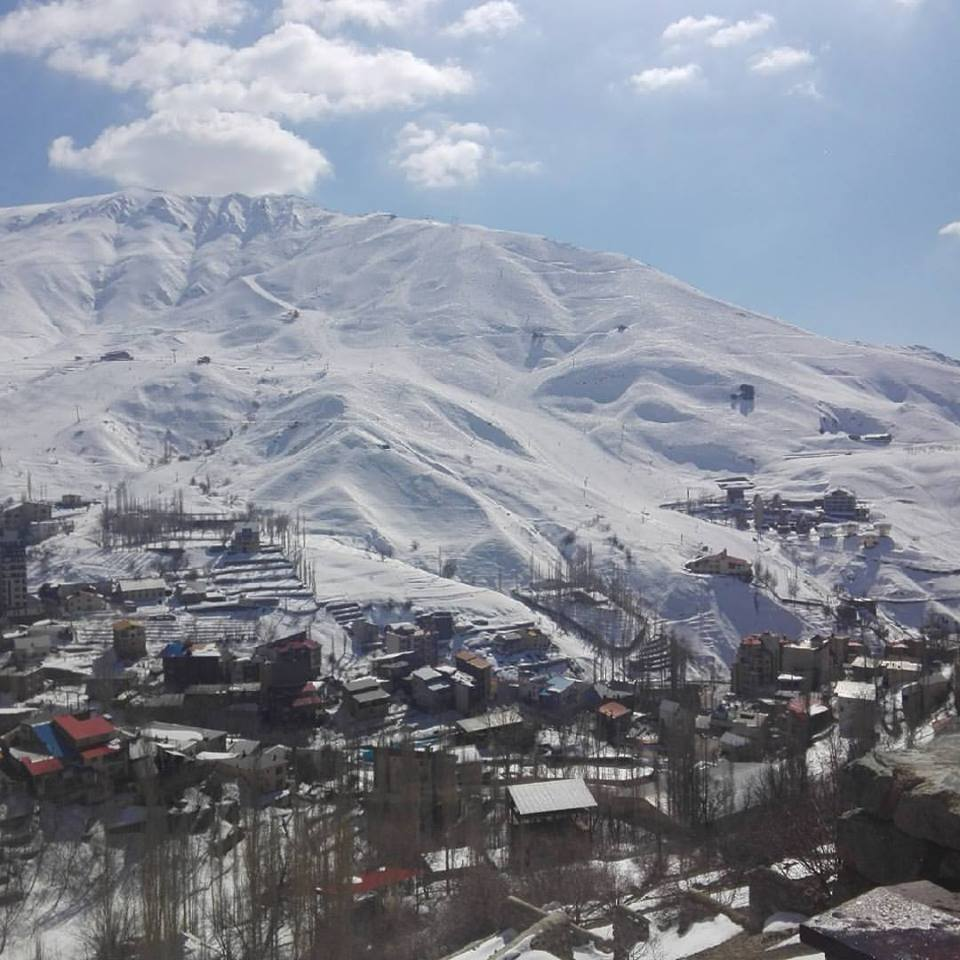
- Shemshak ski resort

- Location within Iran
- Location: Shemshak, Iran
- Coordinates: 36°0′31.5″N 51°29′41″E
- Top elevation: 3,050 m (10,010 ft)
- Base elevation: 2,550 m (8,370 ft)
- Trails: 4
- Lift system: 2 chairlifts 3 Surface lifts
- Snowmaking: No
- Night skiing: Yes

Shemshak is a ski resort situated to the north-east of Tehran in the Alborz mountain range. Shemshak is the second-largest ski area in Iran after Dizin and Darbandsar. It came into operation in 1958. It includes two chairlifts and three surface lifts. The slopes lie at an altitude of 2,550 m to 3,050 m above sea level. The resort includes two main slopes, each with a chair lift at the apex and several lifts. There are no lighting facilities for night skiing.

== Location ==
Shemshak Ski Resort is located 57 kilometers northeast of the Iranian capital of Tehran, and is located in the city of Shemshak. The ski resort is about a 90-minute drive away from Tehran.

== History ==
Skiing on Shemshak started in 1949, but it was not until 1959 when the first lift was constructed on the mountain. In 1996, after renovations on the mountain, the ski resort was recognized as an internationally accepted course by the International Ski Federation.

== Pistes ==
Shemshak has traditionally catered to more advanced skiers while Dizin has drawn beginner, intermediate and advanced skiers. The slopes are quite steep and many of the runs are mogul runs.

Ski season is usually four months from early December to late March depending on the weather with the slope open from 8:00 a.m. to 3:30 p.m. and the night slope from 4:00 p.m. to 08:00 p.m. Unfortunately, due to problems, Shemshak ski resort has been closed for two years.

== Infrastructure ==
Two of the most popular residential complexes in Shemshak are the one built by ASP before the revolution and the Sepahan residence complex, which was finished at the end of 2012 in front of the Gazoil piste. There are two hotels, four restaurants, and a coffeehouse.

== See also ==
- List of ski areas and resorts in Iran
