= Tabagan =

Ski resort near Almaty, Kazakhstan

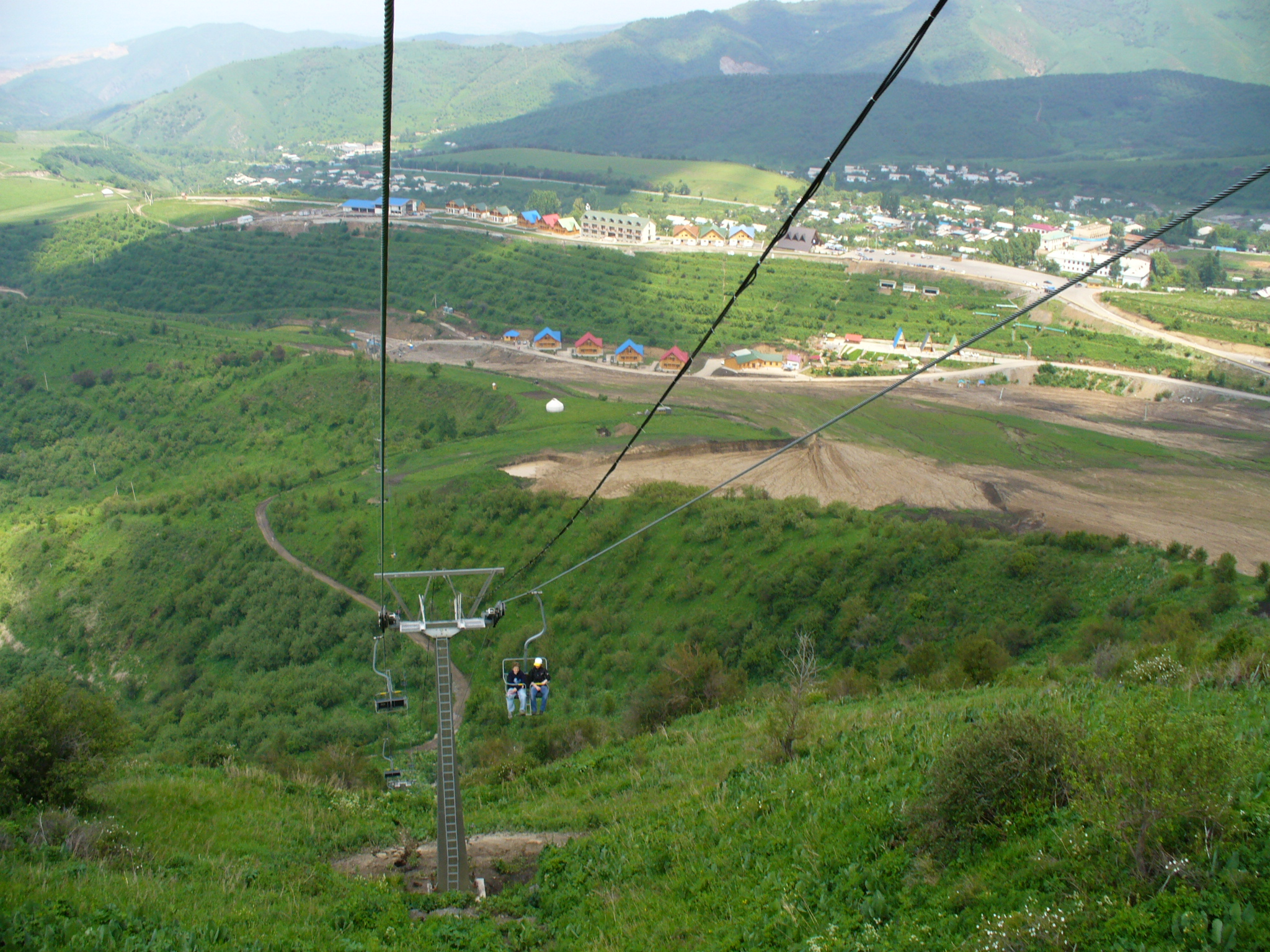
- View of the complex from the cable car
- Interactive map of Tabagan
- Location: Almaty region
- Nearest city: Almaty
- Total length: 37 km (23 mi)

Tabagan (Russian: Табаган, tr. tabagan) - a ski resort near Almaty city, located in Talgar district of Almaty region, Kazakhstan.

The name comes from the word toboggan, which means "to descend, to ride down the mountain". In the North American Indian tribes it meant "broad-brimmed wooden winter sled".

== History ==
Built in 2005 about 17 kilometres (11 mi) away from Almaty, the area of the complex is 91 hectares (220 acres). The highest point of the slope is at 1,650 metres (5,410 ft) above sea level.

The official presentation of the resort took place in January 2006. At the same time the first Cup of the Federation of snowboarding and extreme sports (FESES) was contested on Tabagan. In April 2006, the Eurasian Media Forum was held here.

In 2011, the seventh Asian Winter Games were held on freestyle acrobatics discipline, where Zhibek Arapbaeva and Ruslan Ablyatifov won silver and bronze medals, respectively.

In 2017, the competitions in ski acrobatics and big-air (a type of competition where it is needed to perform stunts after a ski jump) were held here as part of the Winter Universiade. In ski acrobatics Zhibek Arapbayeva won a silver medal and Zhanbota Aldabergenova won a bronze medal.

== Characteristics ==
The ski track:

- Amount of slopes - 6 (3 easy-level slopes, 3 difficult-level slopes)
- Total length of slopes - 37 km (23 mi)
- Time interval of passage - 20 min
- Height difference - 400 metres (1,300 ft)

Two rope tow elevators and a chairlift operate on the territory of the resort.
