= Pooladkaf =

Pooladkaf ski resort پیست اسکی بین المللی پولادکف
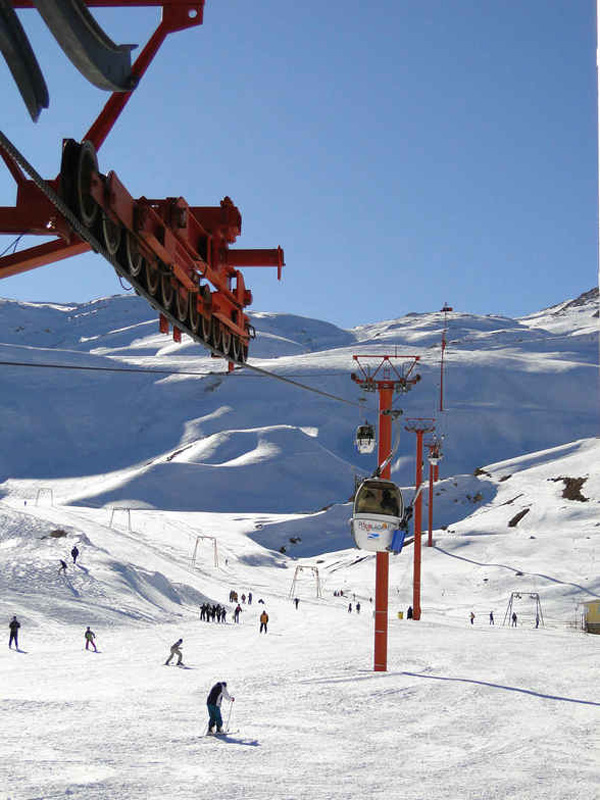
- Pooladkaf ski resort
- Interactive map of Pooladkaf ski resort پیست اسکی بین المللی پولادکف
- Location: Sepidan, Iran
- Nearest city: Ardakan, Fars
- Coordinates: 30°22′13″N 51°54′26″E
- Top elevation: 3,231 m (10,600 ft)
- Base elevation: 2,810 m (9,220 ft)
- Trails: 8
- Lift system: 1 gondola 3 chairlifts
- Snowmaking: Yes
- Night skiing: Yes

Pooladkaf opened in 2002 is a ski resort in the southwest of Iran.

== Location ==
Pooladkaf is located in the northwest of Fars province in the middle of Zagros Mountains. It is 15 km from Ardakan city and 85 km from Shiraz. The nearest international airport is Shiraz international airport.

== Facilities ==
A gondola lift runs 2100 m and surface lifts support skiers. As of 2012 a hotel restaurant was under construction. Snowmobiles and ATVs are available along with Segways, bikes, horses and pedalo boats.

== Image gallery ==
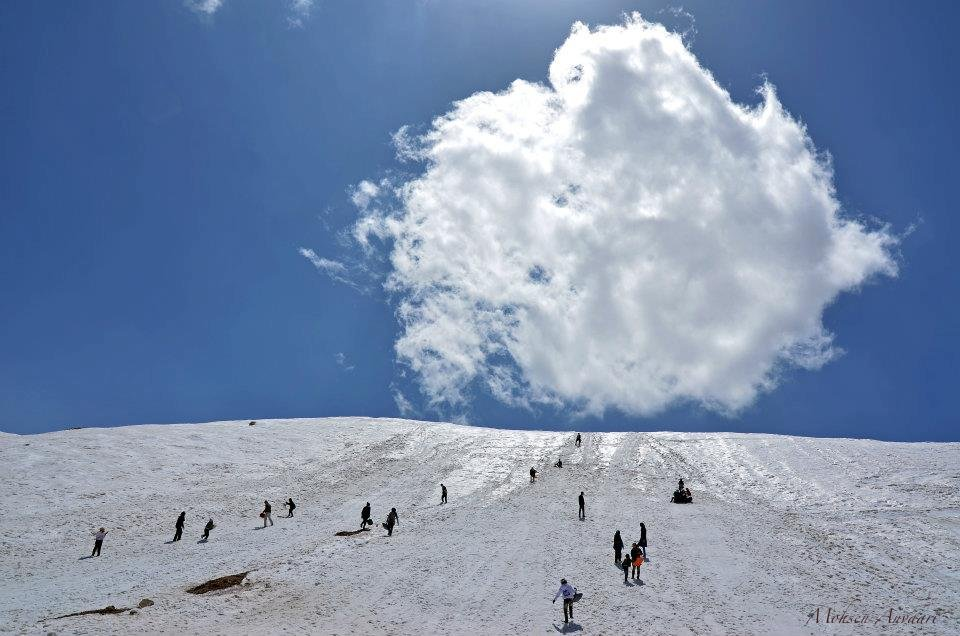
People sliding on the snow in Pooladkaf

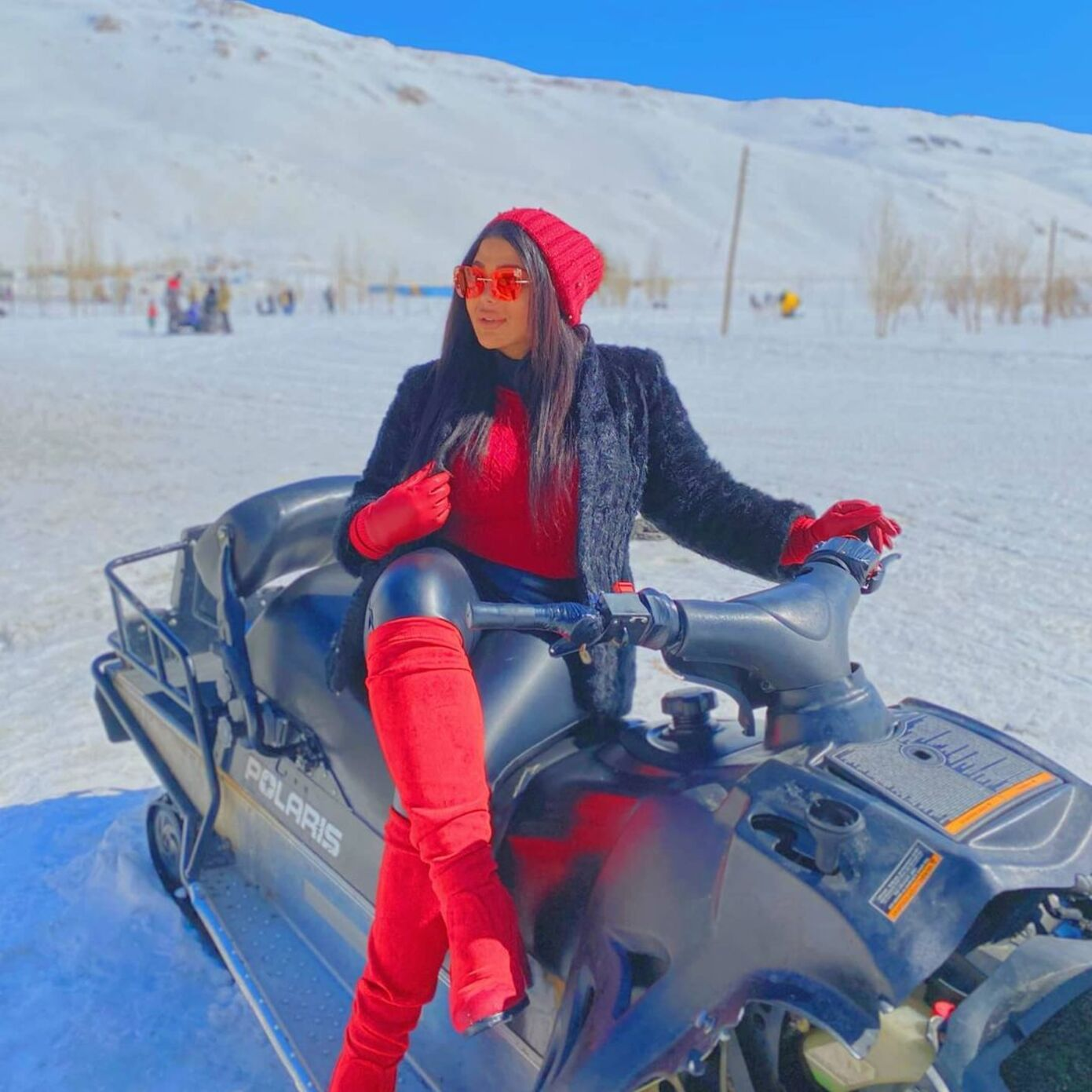
Outdoor recreation in Pooladkaf

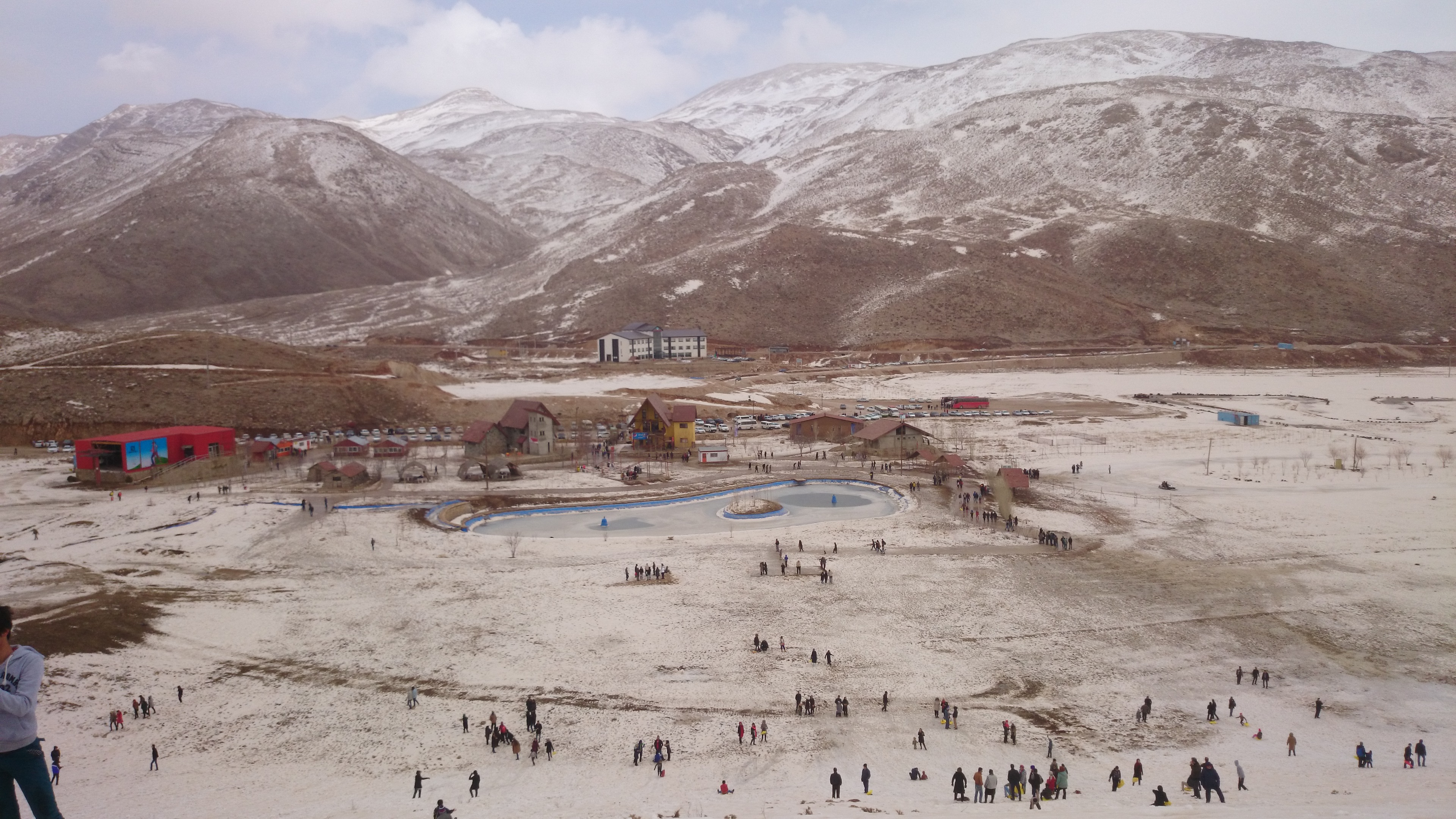
A view of the resort

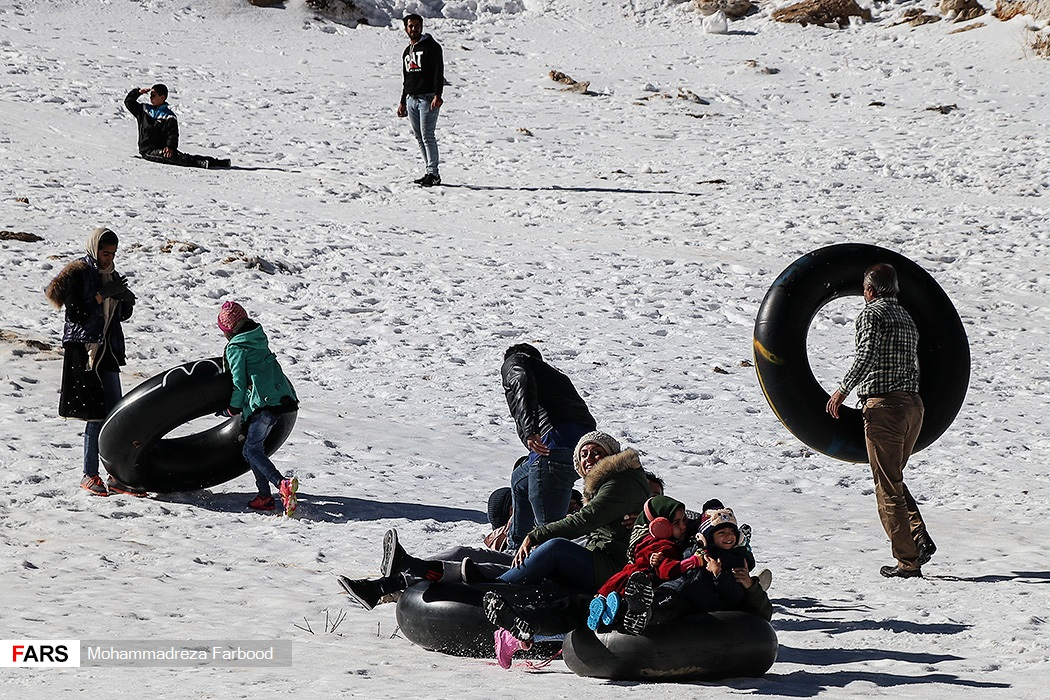
A view of the resort

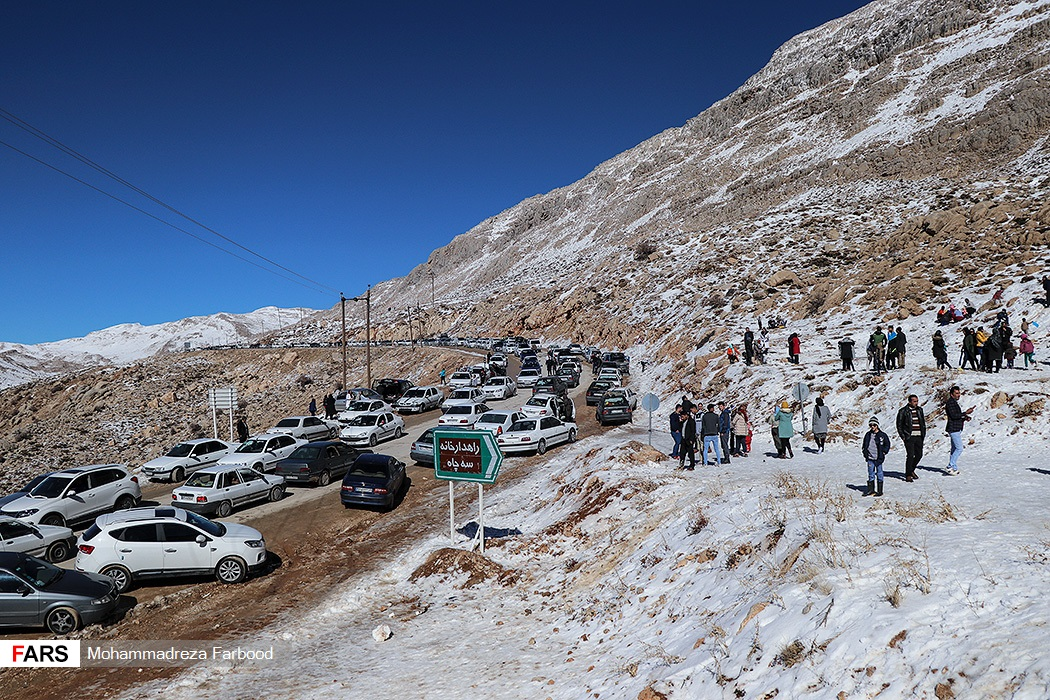
A view of the resort

== See also ==
- List of ski areas and resorts in Iran
