= Lernanist =

Lernanist Լեռնանիստ
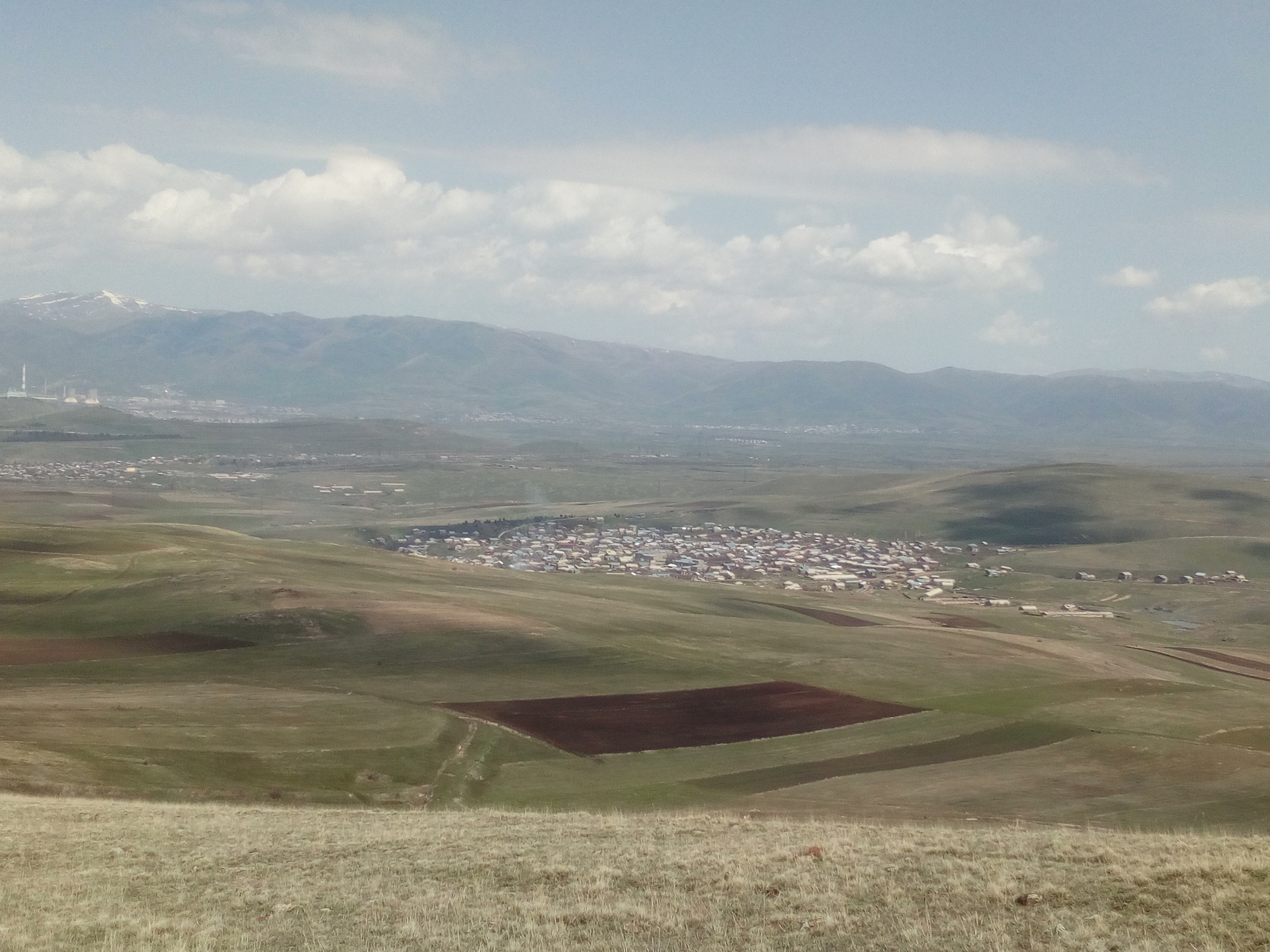

- Location within Armenia
- Coordinates: 40°28′03″N 44°47′53″E
- Country: Armenia
- Marz (Province): Kotayk
- Elevation: 1,922 m (6,306 ft)

Population (2018)
  - Total: 2,887
- Time zone: UTC+4 ( )
  - Summer (DST): UTC+5 ( )

Lernanist (Armenian: Լեռնանիստ, also Romanized as Lerrnanist; formerly, Verin Akhta and Verkhnyaya Akhta) is a village in the Kotayk Province of Armenia. It is home to the descendants of Armenian settlers from Van who survived the Armenian genocide.

== See also ==
- Kotayk Province
