= Fereydunshahr (ski resort) =

Ski resort in Iran

Coordinates: 32.9505°N 50.0485°E

Fereydunshahr فریدون‌شهر
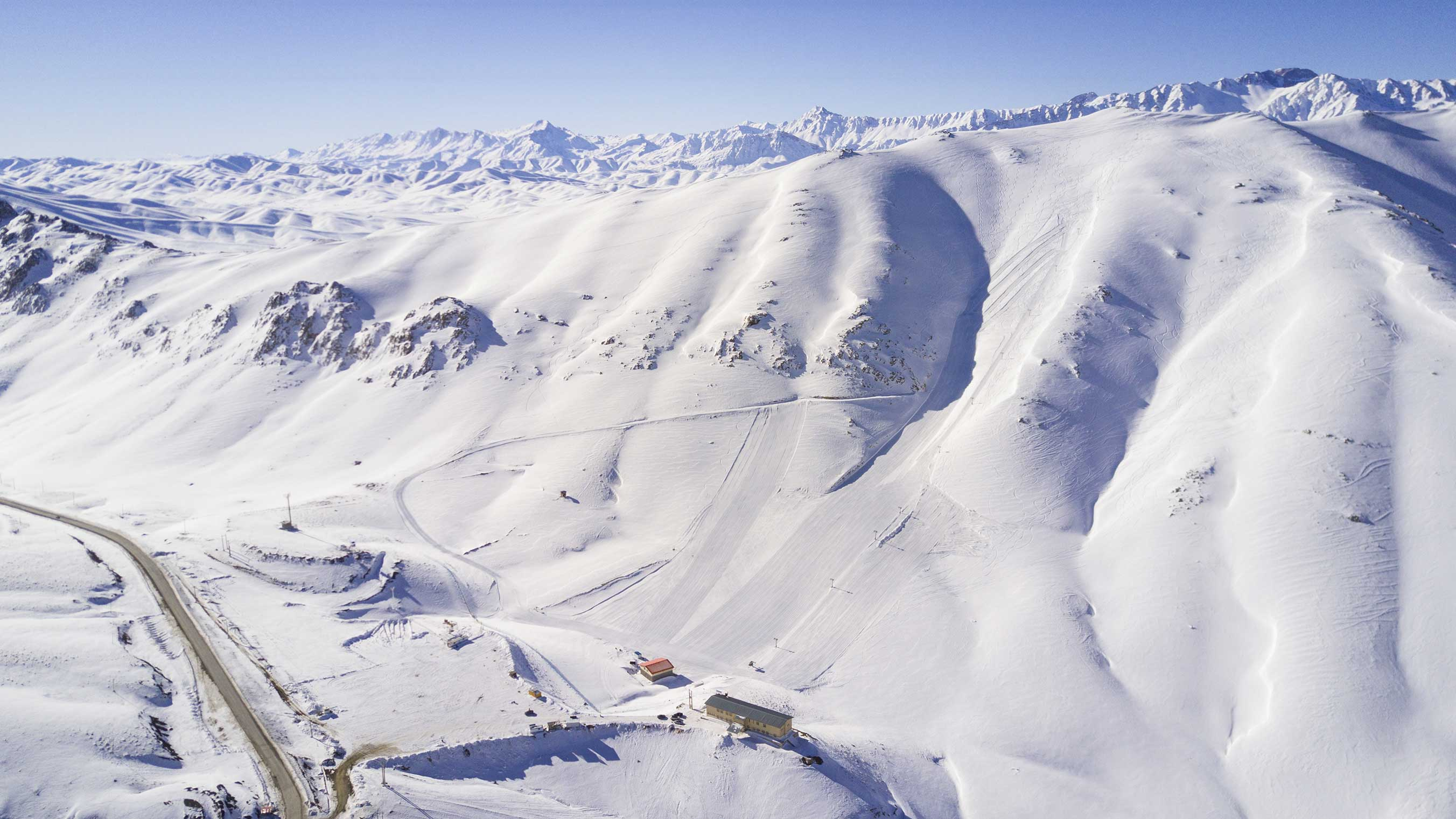
- Interactive map of Fereydunshahr فریدون‌شهر
- Location: Fereydunshahr, Isfahan province, Iran
- Nearest city: Fereydunshahr
- Top elevation: 3,000 m (9,800 ft)
- Base elevation: 2,630 m (8,630 ft)
- Trails: 2
- Night skiing: No
- Website: https://skifa.ir

Fereydunshahr ski resort is the only standard ski resort of Isfahan province. It is located in the Zagros Mountains, near Fereydunshahr and also the village of Choqyurt.

== See also ==
- List of ski areas and resorts in Iran
- List of ski areas and resorts
- Sport in Iran
