= Dizin =

Iranian ski resort

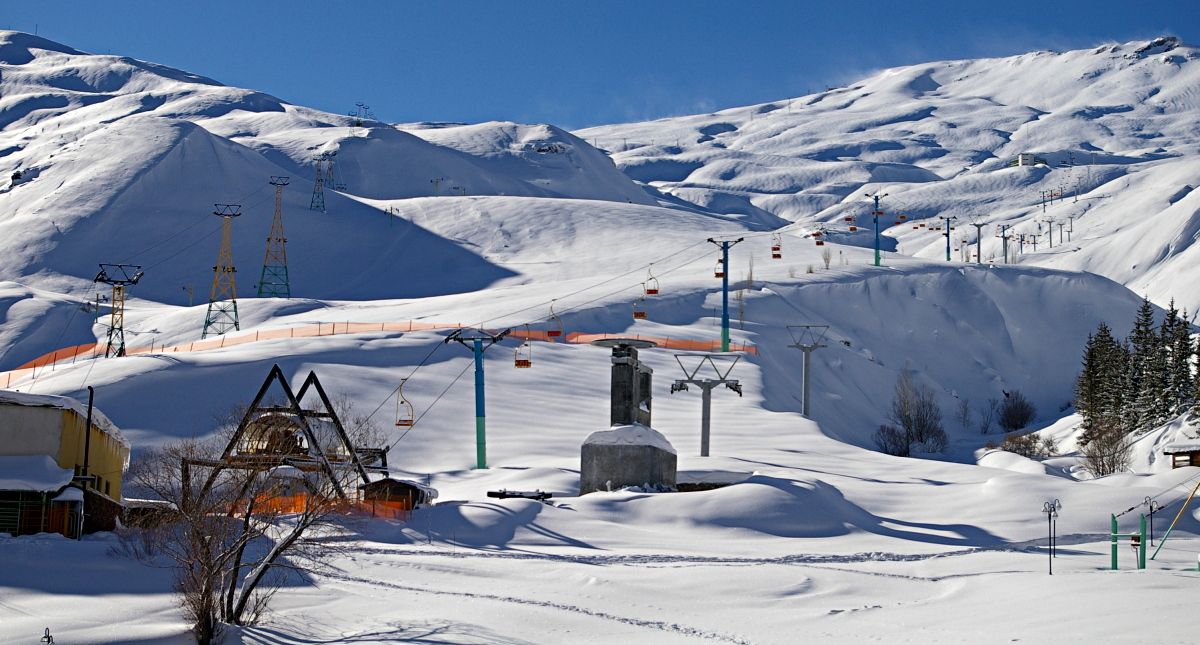
- Dizin ski resort

- Location within Iran
- Location: Karaj, Iran
- Coordinates: 36°02′57″N 51°25′02″E
- Top elevation: 3,600 m (11,800 ft)
- Base elevation: 2,650 m (8,690 ft)
- Skiable area: 469 ha (1,160 acres)
- Trails: 24
- Lift system: 4 gondolas 3 chairlifts 9 Surface lifts
- Snowmaking: No
- Night skiing: No
- Website: http://www.dizinskiresort.com

Dizin (Persian: دیزین) is an Iranian ski resort. It is located in the Alborz mountain range, about 70 km North from Tehran. It was established during the 1960s.

Dizin is the first ski and winter sport resort in Iran which has been officially recognized and granted the title by the International Ski Federation for its capability in administering official and international competitions.

The ski season in Dizin lasts from December to May. The highest ski lift reaches 3,600 m (11,800 ft).

== Ski resort ==
Dizin ski amenities include hotels, cottages, restaurants, villas and private apartments.

== Ski area ==
The ski area includes 4 gondolas, 3 chairlifts, and 9 surface lifts. Dizin is 70 km north of the capital city of Tehran.

== Image gallery ==
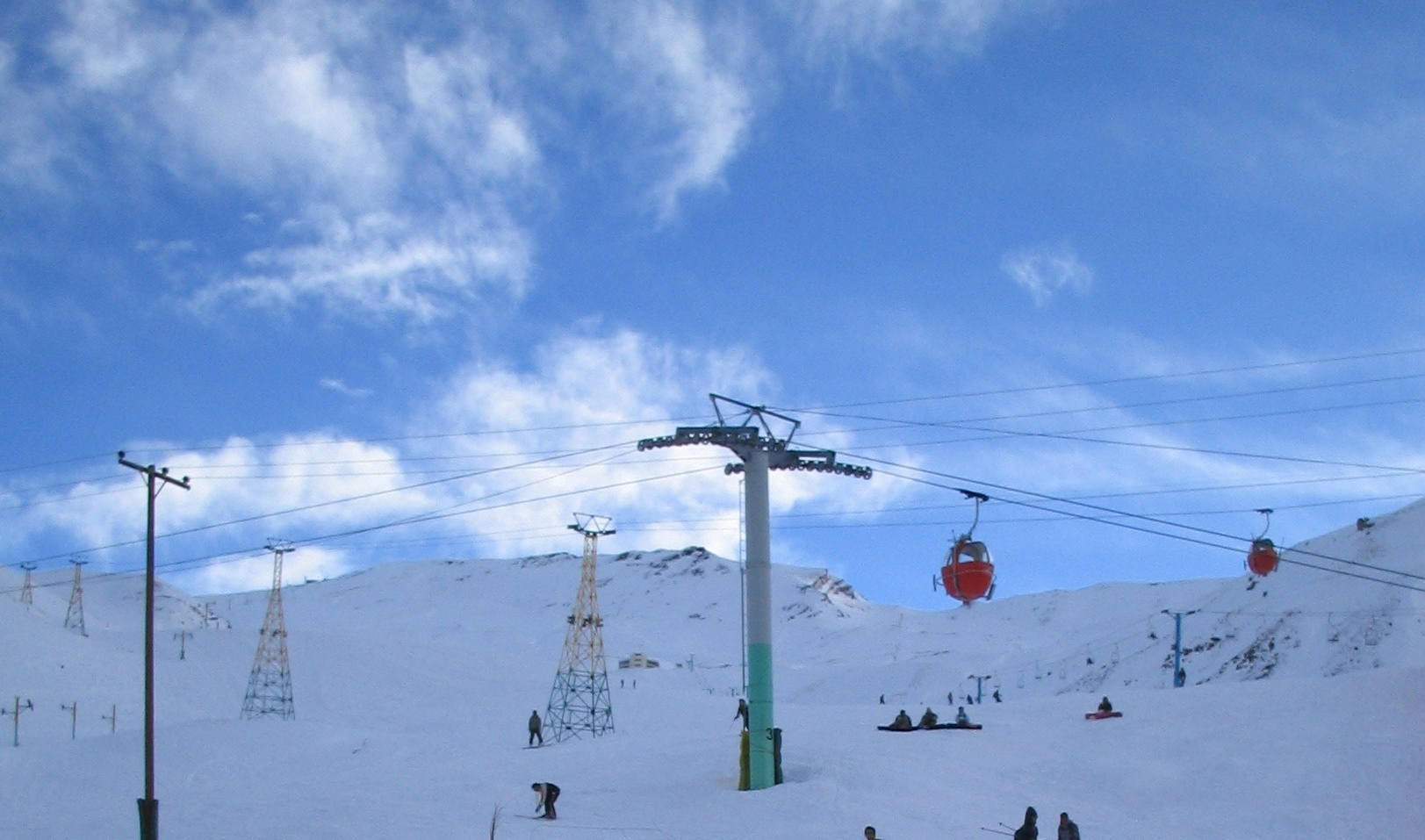
Dizin ski resort and gondola lift

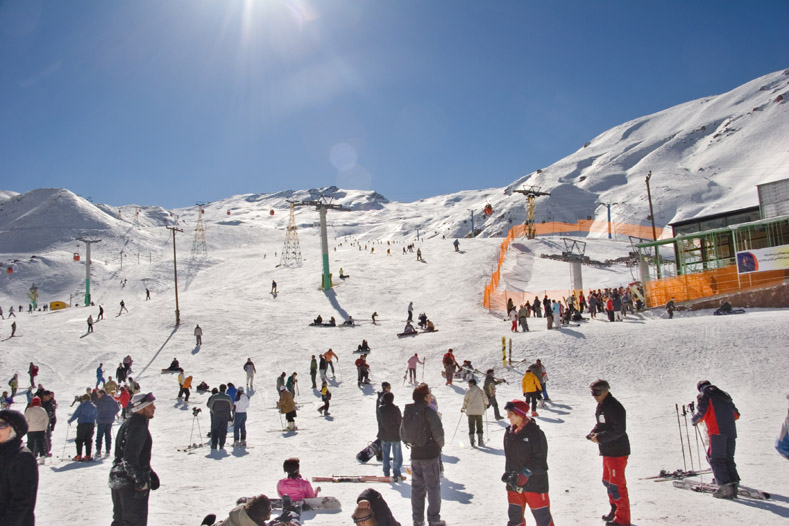
Skiers and snowboarders at the resort

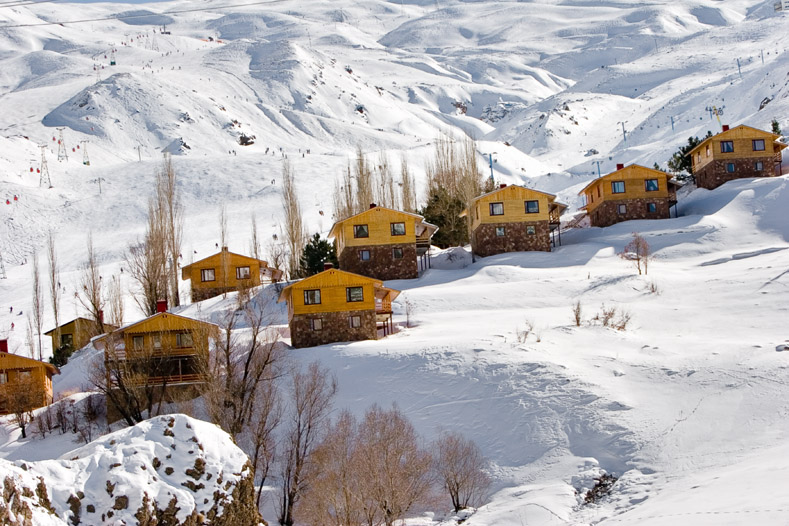

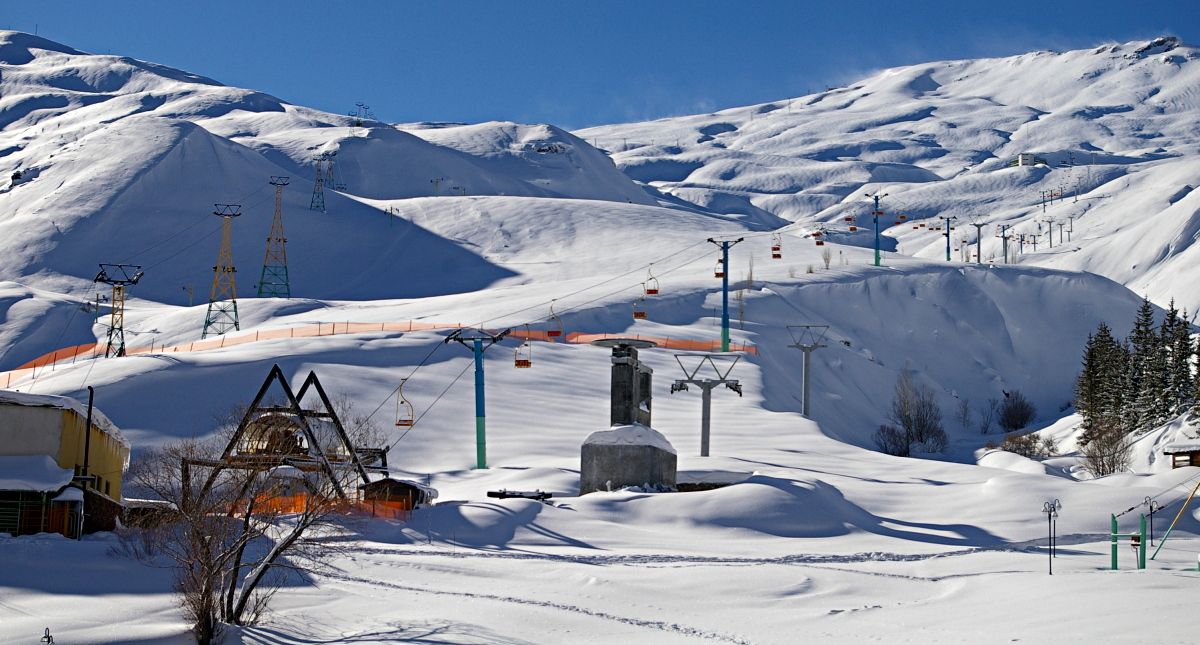

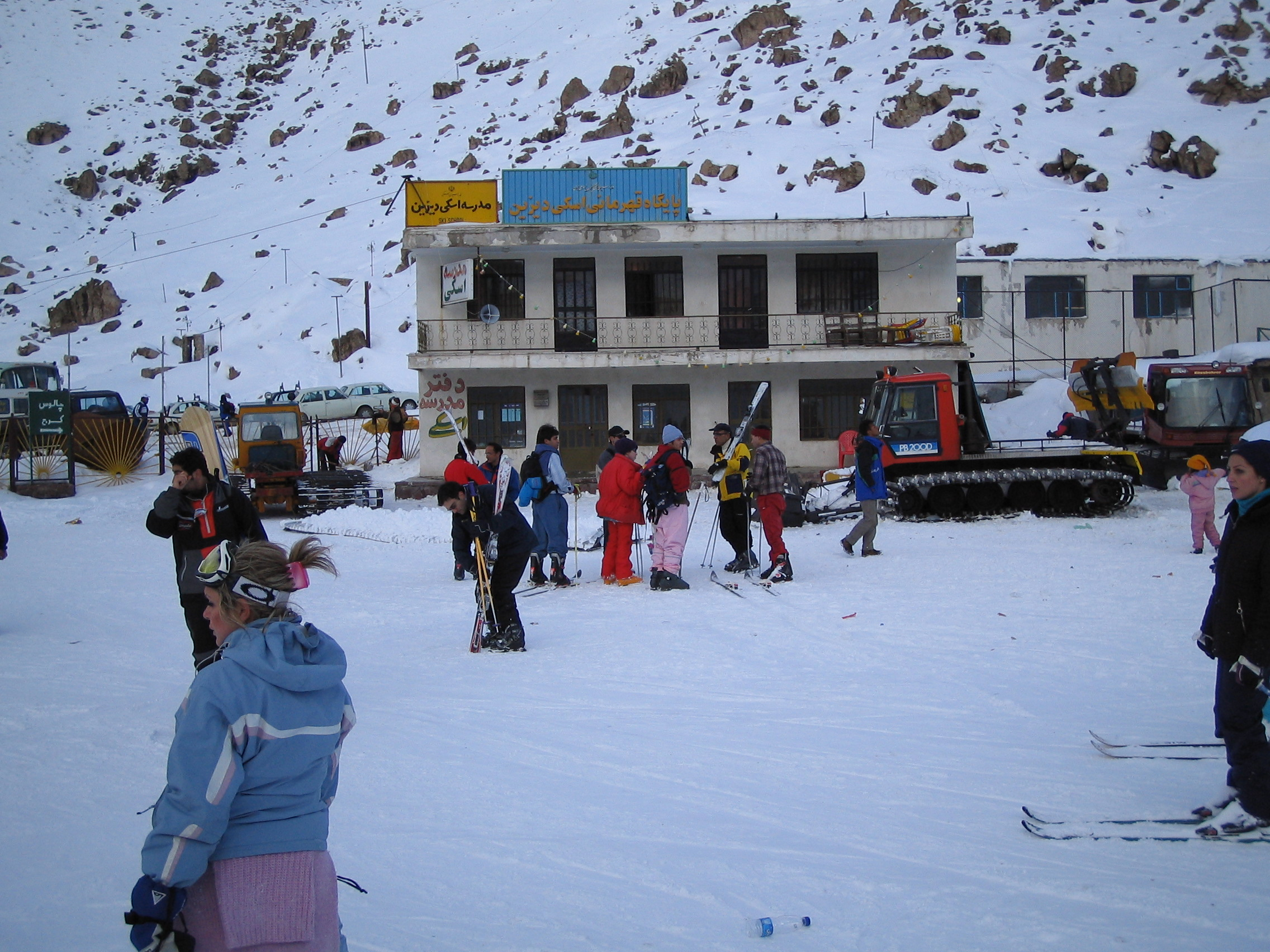

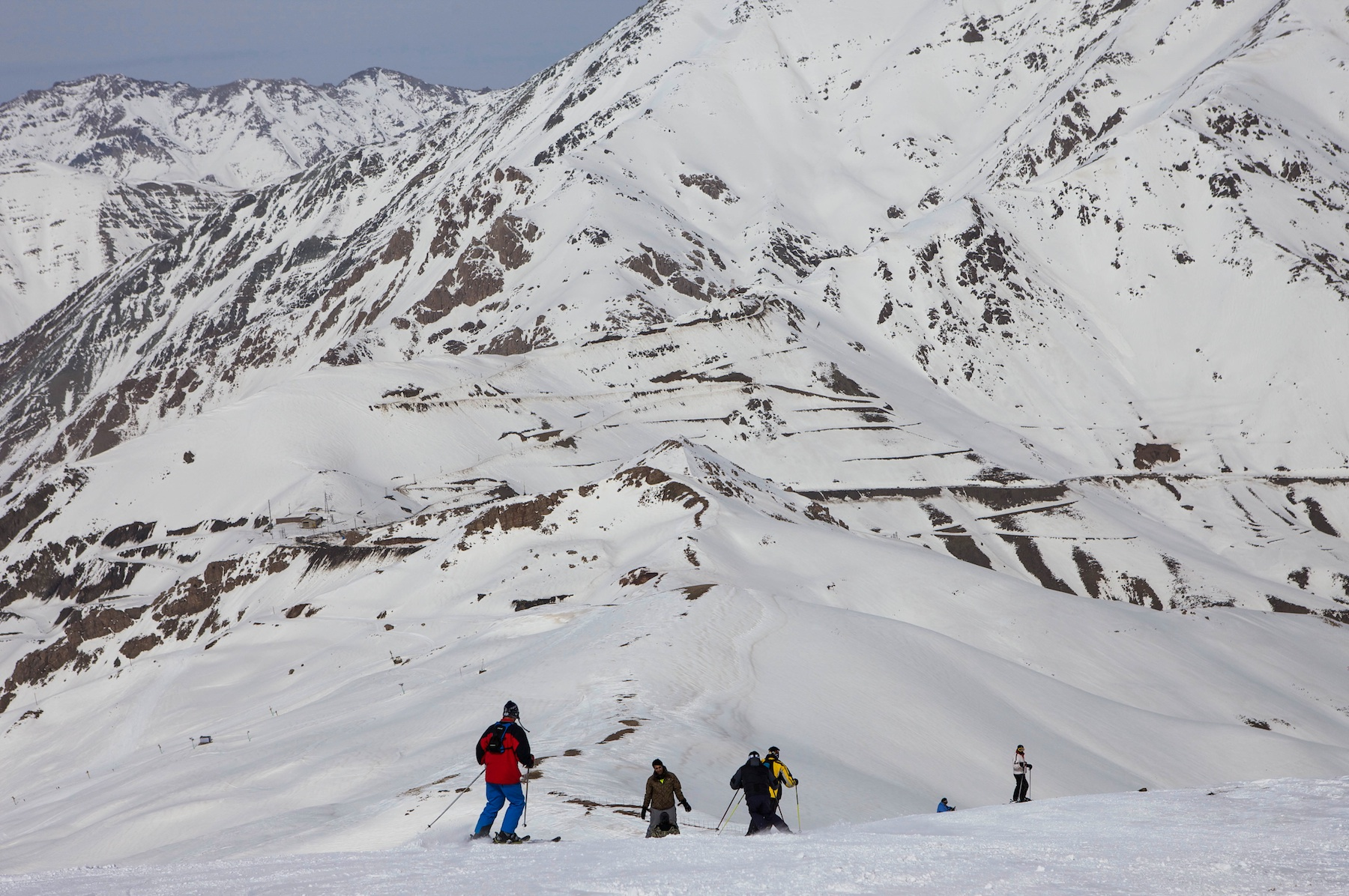

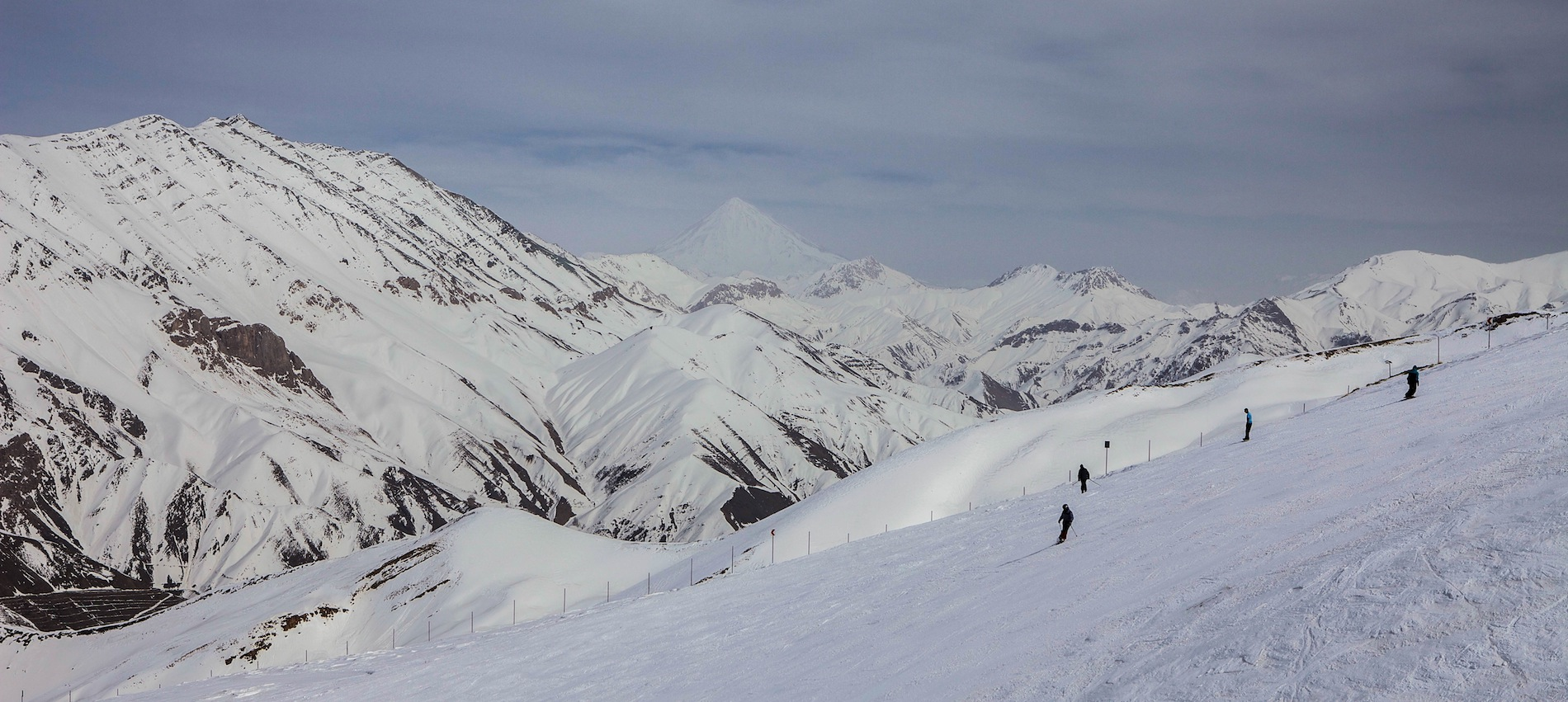

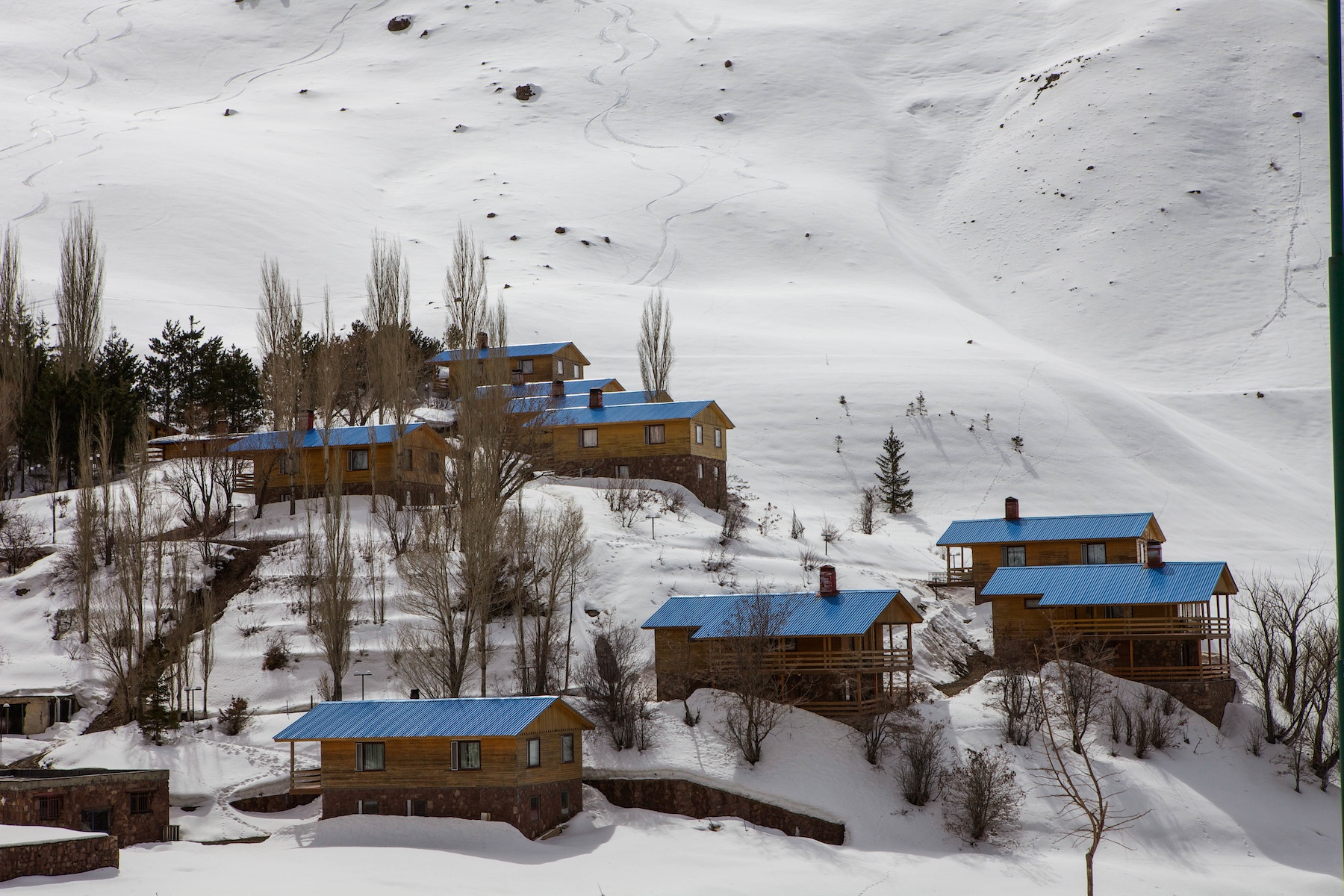

== See also ==
- List of ski areas and resorts in Iran
- List of ski areas and resorts
- Sports in Iran
