= List of anti-war songs =

Some anti-war songs lament aspects of wars, while others patronize war. Most promote peace in some form, while others sing out against specific armed conflicts. Still others depict the physical and psychological destruction that warfare causes to soldiers, innocent civilians, and humanity as a whole. Many of these songs are considered protest songs, and some have been embraced by war-weary people, various peace movements, and peace activists.

== General pacifist and anti-war songs ==
Year	Song	Artist
1992	"Afraid to Shoot Strangers"	Iron Maiden
1979	"5.45"	Gang of Four
1966	"7 O'Clock News/Silent Night"	Simon & Garfunkel
2009	"21 Guns"	Green Day
1984	"99 Luftballons"	Nena
1995	"The Aftermath"	Iron Maiden
2005	"Against"	Mischief Brew
1968	"American Eagle Tragedy"	Earth Opera
2004	"American Idiot"	Green Day
2005	"An Tagen wie diesen"	Fettes Brot
1980	"Army Dreamers"	Kate Bush
2023	"Asteria"	Xandria
1979	"Aux armes et cætera"	Serge Gainsbourg
1901	"The Battle Hymn of the Republic, Updated"	Mark Twain
1974	"Billy, Don't Be a Hero"	Paper Lace, Bo Donaldson & the Heywoods
1988	"Blackened"	Metallica
1963	"Blowin' in the Wind"	Bob Dylan
1984	"Born in the U.S.A."	Bruce Springsteen
1982	"Borderline"	Chris de Burgh
1971	"Bring the Boys Home"	Freda Payne
2019	"British Bombs"	Declan McKenna
1985	"Brothers in Arms"	Dire Straits
1996	"Bulls on Parade"	Rage Against the Machine
1968	"Butcher's Tale"	The Zombies
1965	"Buy a Gun for Your Son"	Tom Paxton
2016	"Call to Arms"	Sturgill Simpson
1970	"Child in Time"	Deep Purple
1971	"Children of the Grave"	Black Sabbath
1964	"Chimes of Freedom"	Bob Dylan
1990	"Civil War"	Guns N' Roses
1959	"La Colombe"	Jacques Brel (France)
1963	"Come Away Melinda"	Harry Belafonte
1969	"Cranes" (Журавли́)	Rasul Gamzatov / Yan Frenkel / Mark Bernes
1988	"The Crest"	The Men They Couldn't Hang
1966	"The Cruel War"	Peter, Paul and Mary
2011	"The Cruel Wars"	The Dreadnoughts
1971	"El Derecho De Vivir En Paz" (The Right to Live in Peace)	Víctor Jara
1954	"Le Déserteur"	Boris Vian (France)
2007	"The Desolation of Ares"	Be'lakor
1972	"Dialogue"	Chicago
1986	"Disposable Heroes"	Metallica
1987	"The Dogs of War"	Pink Floyd
1967	"(Don’t Put Your Boys in the Army), Mrs. Ward"	The Idle Race
1980	"Не стреляй!" ("Don't Shoot!")	DDT
1982	"Ein bisschen Frieden"	Nicole
2005	"Empire"	Dar Williams
1965	"Eve of Destruction"	Barry McGuire
1968	"Everybody's Cryin' Mercy"	Mose Allison
1969	"The Fiddle and the Drum"	Joni Mitchell
1984	"Fight Fire With Fire"	Metallica
1995	“Зезагаш” (“Flowers”)	Alimsultan Imam (Soviet/Chechen)
1973	"For the Peace of All Mankind"	Albert Hammond
1967	"For What It's Worth"	Buffalo Springfield
1984	"For Whom the Bell Tolls"	Metallica
1969	"Fortunate Son"	Creedence Clearwater Revival
1995	"Fortunes of War"	Iron Maiden
1969	"Galveston"	Glen Campbell
1980	"Games Without Frontiers"	Peter Gabriel
1974	"The Gates of Delirium"	Yes
1998	"The General"	Dispatch
1980	"Generals and Majors"	XTC
1994	"Genocide"	The Offspring
2022	"Gimme Hope	Asian Kung-Fu Generation
1986	"Gimme Peace on the Earth'"	Modern Talking
1973	"Give Me Love (Give Me Peace on Earth)"	George Harrison
1969	"Give Peace a Chance"	Plastic Ono Band, John Lennon
1987	"Gods of War"	Def Leppard
1963	"Gone the Rainbow"	Peter, Paul and Mary
1996	"Graveland"	In Flames
1966	"La Guerra Di Piero"	Fabrizio De André (Italy)
1962	"La Guerre De 14–18"	Georges Brassens (France)
2013	"Gun"	My Chemical Romance
1987	"Gun Shy"	10,000 Maniacs
1983	"The Gunner's Dream"	Pink Floyd
2007	"Gunslinger"	Avenged Sevenfold
2010	"Half a World Away"	Joe Cerisano
1966	"Handsome Johnny"	Richie Havens
1971	"Happy Xmas (War Is Over)"	The Plastic Ono Band
2010	"Harmony"	Never Shout Never
1969	"Harold Land"	Yes
1976	"Harvest for the World"	The Isley Brothers
1996	"Hero of the Day"	Metallica
1992	"Heal the World"	Michael Jackson
2008	"Hero of War"	Rise Against
2007	"Heroes And Martyrs"	Bad Religion
2024	"Hind's Hall"	Macklemore
1991	"Hole in the Bucket"	Michael Franti
2004	"Holiday"	Green Day
2010	"Holy War"	Asia
2019	"Home Back"	Jinjer (Ukraine)
1968	"The House at Pooneil Corners"	Jefferson Airplane
1985	"How Many Tears?"	Helloween
1988	"Hund des Krieges"	Peter Maffay
2006	"Hymn for the Dead"	Anti-Flag
1965	"I Ain't Marching Anymore"	Phil Ochs
1987	"I Don't Want to Be a Hero"	Johnny Hates Jazz
2023	"Igor"	Heinz-Rudolf Kunze
1984	"I Hope You Get Drafted"	Dicks
2009	"I Know"	The Proclaimers
1982	"I Love a Man in a Uniform"	Gang of Four
2020	"I Want to Die in a War"	Jreg
1971	"I'd Love to Change the World"	Ten Years After
1960	"If I Had a Hammer"	Peter, Paul and Mary
1974	"I'm Asking You, Sergeant, Where's Mine?"	Billy Connolly
1954	"I'm in Korea"	J. B. Lenoir
1971	"Imagine"	John Lennon
1981	"In the Army Now"	Bolland & Bolland
1981	"Invisible Sun"	The Police
1983	"It's a Mistake"	Men at Work
1989	"Jennifer Lost the War"	The Offspring
2001	"Jet Fighter"	Butthole Surfers
1962	"John Brown"	Bob Dylan
2002	"John Walker's Blues"	Steve Earle
1867	"Johnny I Hardly Knew Ye"	Traditional
2013	"Johnny S'en Va En Guerre"	Les Sales Majestés
1976	"Johnny Was"	Bob Marley & the Wailers
1978	"Junior's Eyes"	Black Sabbath
1955	"Les Joyeux Bouchers"	Boris Vian (France)
1989	"Kill the President"	The Offspring
2014	"Killing Strangers"	Marilyn Manson
2013	"Krieg Kennt Keine Sieger"	Saltatio Mortis
1971	"La riva bianca, la riva nera"	Iva Zannichi
1974	"La La Peace Song"	Al Wilson, O. C. Smith
1971	"Lady in Black"	Uriah Heep
1980	"Last Chance"	Shooting Star
1950	"Last Night I Had the Strangest Dream"	Ed McCurdy
1973	"Lay Down Your Arms"	Doron Levinson (Israel)
1986	"Lay Down Your Guns"	Emerson, Lake & Powell
2013	"Letters Home"	Radical Face
1979	"Little Boy Soldiers"	The Jam
1983	"A Little Good News"	Anne Murray
1986	"Live in Peace"	The Firm
2006	"Living With War"	Neil Young
1990	"Love Can Build a Bridge"	The Judds
1973	"Love Train"	The O'Jays
1970	"Lucky Man"	Emerson, Lake, and Palmer
1973	"Luglio, Agosto, Settembre (Nero)"	Area
1982	"Lysistrata"	Utopia
2012	"Machine Gun to Keiyōshi" (Machine Guns and Adjectives)	Asian Kung-Fu Generation
2008	"Make Dub Not War"	Quantic Presenta Flowering Inferno
2006	"Mama"	My Chemical Romance
1977	"Man of War"	The Jackson 5
1985	"The Man's Too Strong"	Dire Straits
1991	"March for Me, Die for Me"	Cyclone Temple
1997	"March With Me"	Montserrat Caballé and Vangelis
1963	"Masters of War"	Bob Dylan
2016	"A Matter of Habit"	Moddi
1962	"May There Always Be Sunshine" ("Пусть всегда будет солнце!")	Lev Oshanin / Arkady Ostrovsky / Maya Kristalinskaya
2003	"Meneer De President"	K3
1986	"Method to Your Madness"	Metal Church
2005	"M.I.A."	Avenged Sevenfold
1971	"Military Madness"	Graham Nash
1973	"Mind Games"	John Lennon
1961	"Miss Guéguerre"	Léo Ferré
2010	"Mother of Mercy"	Iron Maiden
1982	"Mothers, Daughters, Wives"	Judy Small
1964	"Mr. Lonely"	Bobby Vinton
2015	"Murder Song (5, 4, 3, 2, 1)"	Aurora (singer)
1993	"Né en 17 à Leidenstadt"	Jean-Jacques Goldman
1987	"Nein, meine Söhne geb' ich nicht"	Reinhard Mey
1970	"Never Kill Another Man"	Steve Miller Band
2008	"No.9"	Asian Kung-Fu Generation
1980	"No Dudaría"	Antonio Flores
1984	"No Fuckin' War"	Dicks
1976	"No Man's Land"	Eric Bogle
2018	"No More"	Disturbed
1978	"No More Trouble"	Bob Marley & the Wailers
1983	"No Remorse"	Metallica
2024	"Nobody’s Soldier"	Hozier
2018	"Non mi avete fatto niente"	Ermal Meta and Fabrizio Moro
1983	"Not Now John"	Pink Floyd
1970	"Ohio"	Crosby, Stills, Nash & Young
1988	"One"	Metallica
1964	"One More Parade"	Phil Ochs
1969	"One Tin Soldier"	The Original Caste, Coven
2007	"Our Solemn Hour"	Within Temptation
2018	"Over the Battlefield"	Omnium Gatherum
1961	"Pacific Blues"	Léo Ferré
1971	"Parachutiste"	Maxime le Forestier
1971	"The Park"	Uriah Heep
1982	"Part III"	Bad Religion
1988	"Part IV (The Index Fossil)"	Bad Religion
1972	"The Patriot's Dream"	Gordon Lightfoot
2002	"Paz Y Amor" ("Peace And love")	Gisela
1981	"Peace"	Roger Lee Hall
2025	"Peacefield"	Ghost
1971	"Peace Train"	Cat Stevens
1977	"Peace Will Come"	Tom Paxton
1970	"Peace Will Come (According to Plan)""	Melanie Safka
1972	"People, Let's Stop the War"	Grand Funk Railroad
2000	"Pick Up the Bones"	Alice Cooper
1982	"Pipes of Peace"	Paul McCartney
1986	"Plantas Embaixo do Aquário"	Legião Urbana
1972	"Political Science"	Randy Newman
2002	"Poor Places"	Wilco
1971	"Power to the People"	John Lennon
1958	"Prayer for Peace"	Perry Como
2002	"Prisoners of War"	Funker Vogt
1969	"Prologue, August 29, 1968"	Chicago
1976	"Protocol"	Gordon Lightfoot
2015	"Psycho"	Muse
1987	"Put Down That Weapon"	Midnight Oil
1985	"Querida Milagros"	El Último de la Fila
1969	"Questions 67 & 68"	Chicago
2018	"Raise Your Banner"	Within Temptation
1979	"Ratziti Sheteda"	Uzi Hitman
1982	"Remember the Heroes"	Sammy Hagar
1992	"Rest in Peace"	Extreme
2018	"The Reckoning"	Within Temptation
1967	"Requiem for the Masses"	The Association
1968	"Revolution"	The Beatles
1985	"Ride Across the River"	Dire Straits
2006	"Right in Two"	Tool
2005	"Road to Joy"	Bright Eyes
1975	"Rock Around the Bunker"	Serge Gainsbourg
1992	"Rooster"	Alice in Chains
2012	"Royay E Ma" ("Our Dream")	Ebi, Shadmehr Aghili
1985	"Russians"	Sting
1972	"Sail Away"	Randy Newman
1962	"Sag Mir, Wo Die Blumen Sind"	Marlene Dietrich
1971	"Sam Stone"	John Prine
2018	"Sayōnara Soldier" (Goodbye Soldier)	Asian Kung-Fu Generation
1970	"Shir LaShalom"	Lehakat HaNachal
1982	"Short Memory"	Midnight Oil
1984	"Showdown"	Jefferson Starship
1966	"The Side of a Hill"	Paul Simon
1971	"Simon the Bullet Freak"	Uriah Heep
1968	"Six White Horses"	Henson Cargill
1968	"Sky Pilot"	The Animals
1970	"Sloth"	Fairport Convention
1984	"Soldados"	Legião Urbana
1971	"Soldier Blue"	Buffy Sainte-Marie
1962	"Soldier Boy"	The Shirelles
1986	"Soldier of Plenty"	Jackson Browne
2005	"Soldier Side"	System of a Down
1981	"Soldiers"	ABBA
2011	"Soldier's Angel"	Stevie Nicks
2006	"Soldier's Poem"	Muse
1987	"Soldiers of Love"	Liliane Saint-Pierre
1971	"Soldiers Who Want to Be Heroes"	Rod McKuen
1969	"Some Mother's Son"	The Kinks
2008	"Something to see"	Tracy Chapman
1972	"State of Union"	Chicago
1995	"Still Spinning Shrapnel"	Skyclad
2010	"Stop the War"	Sugar Blue
1970	"Stop the War Now"	Edwin Starr
1982	"Stories of a Hero"	Frank Marino
1985	"Stupid, Stupid War"	Dirty Rotten Imbeciles
1967	"Suppose They Give a War and No One Comes"	The West Coast Pop Art Experimental Band
2011	"Survivor Guilt"	Rise Against
2005	"Sweet Neo Con"	The Rolling Stones
1992	"Systematic Execution"	Malevolent Creation
2005	"Tassavor Kon" ("Imagine")	Siavash Ghomayshi
1991	"Tell Me Why"	Genesis
1985	"Territories"	Rush
1971	"That's What I'd Like to Know"	Colonel Bagshot
2016	"The Sun Is Not Down"	Gotch
1964	"The Times They are a-Changin'"	Bob Dylan
1964	"There but for Fortune"	Phil Ochs
1967	"There Won't Be Many Coming Home"	Roy Orbison
1981	"They All Look the Same"	Grace Slick
2017	"This Is War"	Bush
1986	"Through the Barricades"	Spandau Ballet
1969	"To Susan on the West Coast Waiting"	Donovan
2003	"To Washington"	John Mellencamp
1978	"Too Much War"	Inner Circle & the Fat Man Riddim Section
1993	"Too Young to Die"	Jamiroquai
2010	"Trigger-Happy Hands"	Placebo
1959	"Turn! Turn! Turn!"	Pete Seeger
2022	"Twenties"	Ghost
1984	"Two Tribes"	Frankie Goes to Hollywood
1993	"Under the Same Sun"	Scorpions
1971	"Ungena Za Ulimwengu (Unite the World)"	The Temptations
1964	"Universal Soldier"	Buffy Sainte-Marie / Glen Campbell
1989	"Unity"	Operation Ivy
2006	"Unknown Soldier"	Breaking Benjamin
1968	"The Unknown Soldier"	The Doors
1973	"Us and Them"	Pink Floyd
2008	"Violet Hill"	Coldplay
1993	"Vrede"	Ruth Jacott
1967	"Waist Deep in the Big Muddy"	Pete Seeger
2021	"Waiting on a War"	Foo Fighters
1979	"Walked in Line"	Joy Division
1984	"Walking on a Thin Line (song)"	Huey Lewis and the News
1976	"War"	Bob Marley and the Wailers
1986	"War"	Bruce Springsteen
1970	"War"	Edwin Starr
1984	"War"	Frankie Goes to Hollywood
2003	"War"	Joan Osbourne
1980	"War"	Zounds
1998	"War?"	System of a Down
1988	"Война" ("War")	Kino (band)
1994	"War Again"	Oingo Boingo
1987	"War Baby"	Mick Jagger
1987	"War inside My Head"	Suicidal Tendencies
1970	"War Pigs"	Black Sabbath
1997	"War Pimp Renaissance"	Lard
1984	"The War Song"	Culture Club
1972	"War Song"	Neil Young and Graham Nash
1967	"War Sucks"	Red Krayola
2006	"War Sucks, Let's Party!"	Anti-Flag
2017	"War TV"	Gerry Cinnamon
1980	"Wardance"	Killing Joke
1992	"Wargasm"	L7
2008	“Warm Winter”	Seth Sentry
2004	"Warrior"	Steve Earle
2015	"Wars for Nothing"	Boggie
1980	"Washington Bullets"	The Clash
2023	"Watergun"	Remo Forrer
2007	"The Way the Wind Blows"	Rush
1981	"We Don't Need the Army"	Slime
1971	"We Got to Have Peace"	Curtis Mayfield
1965	"We Gotta Get Out of This Place"	The Animals
1967	"We Love You"	The Rolling Stones
2011	"Welcome to Your Wedding Day"	The Airborne Toxic Event
1966	"Welterusten meneer de president"	Boudewijn de Groot
1964	"What Are You Fighting For"	Phil Ochs
2002	"What If We All Stopped Paying Taxes?"	Sharon Jones & the Dap-Kings
1965	"What the World Needs Now Is Love"	Hal David/Burt Bacharach
1971	"What's Going On"	Marvin Gaye
2002	"What's Left of the Flag"	Flogging Molly
1974	"(What's So Funny 'Bout) Peace, Love, and Understanding"	Nick Lowe
1990	"When Hell Breaks Loose"	Peer Günt
2014	"When Two Empires Collide"	Jinjer
1980	"When Ya Get Drafted"	Dead Kennedys
1961	"Where Have All the Flowers Gone?"	Pete Seeger
2003	"Where Is the Love?"	Black-Eyed Peas
2010	"White Flag Warrior"	Flobots
1980	"Who's Gonna Win the War?"	Hawkwind
1975	"Why Can't We Be Friends?"	War (band)
1973	"Why Can't We Live Together"	Timmy Thomas
1979	"Why Go to War"	William Onyeabor
1970	"Wicked World"	Black Sabbath
1991	"Wind of Change"	Scorpions
1964	"With God on Our Side"	Bob Dylan
2011	"The Words That Maketh Murder"	PJ Harvey
2014	"World Peace Is None of Your Business"	Morrissey
1981	"World Turned Upside Down"	Dick Gaughan
2004	"World War"	Yellowman
1981	"Wozu Sind Kriege Da?"	Udo Lindenberg
1969	"The Yard Went on Forever"	Richard Harris
1979	"Yihye Tov (It Will Be Good/Things Will Be Better)"	David Broza
2003	"Your Revolution Is a Joke"	Funeral for a Friend
1971	"Yours Is No Disgrace"	Yes
2007	"Zero Sum"	Nine Inch Nails
1994	"Zombie"	The Cranberries
1976	"Zombie"	Fela Kuti
2008	"Blessed Are the Land Mines"	Brave Saint Saturn
1989	"Of Rage and War"	Savatage
1986	"Wings of Destiny"	Fifth Angel

== Thirty Years War ==
Year	song	Artist
2012	En Livstid I Krig/A Lifetime of War	Sabaton

== American Civil War ==
Year	Song	Artist
2009	"Abraham Lincoln"	Clutch
1861-1863	"All Quiet Along the Potomac Tonight"	Ethel Lynn Beers (lyrics,1861); John Hill Hewitt (music, 1863)
1969	"Arkansas Grass"	Axiom
1995	"Ben McCulloch"	Steve Earle
1962	"The Big Battle"	Johnny Cash
1974	"Billy Don't Be a Hero"	Paper Lace
2013	"Bloodshed"	Soulfly
2011	"Broken Hymns"	Dropkick Murphys
1991	"Civil War"	Guns N' Roses
2003	"Cross the Green Mountain"	Bob Dylan
1962	"Cruel War"	Peter, Paul and Mary
2004	"The Devil to Pay"	Iced Earth
1987	"Gettysburg"	The Brandos
1983	"God Bless Robert E. Lee"	Johnny Cash
1963	"In the Hills of Shiloh"	Shel Silverstein/Bobby Bare
1959	"Johnny Reb"	Johnny Horton
1968	"The Klan"	Richie Havens
1993	"Lincoln's Army"	Johnny McEvoy
2008	"Lone Pine Hill"	Justin Townes Earle
1865	"Marching Through Georgia"	Henry Clay Work
1969	"The Night They Drove Old Dixie Down"	The Band / Joan Baez
1863	"Poor Kitty Popcorn"	Henry C. Work
1991	"Rebel Soldier"	Waylon Jennings
1999	"Shiloh Town"	Tim Hardin
1998	"Silent Reign of Heroes"	Molly Hatchet
1968	"Six White Horses"	Tommy Cash
2012	"Some Nights"	Fun
1978	"The Southland's Bleeding"	Waylon Jennings
1986	"Swan Swan H"	R.E.M.
2004	"Tears of God"	Josh Turner
1863	"Tenting on the Old Camp Ground"	Walter Kittredge
1993	"Two Soldiers"	Bob Dylan
1861	"The Vacant Chair"	George F. Root
1921	"Wildwood Flower"	Carter Family

== American Indian Wars ==
Year	Song	Artist
1964	"Apache Tears"	Johnny Cash
2008	"Battle at Little Big Horn"	White Lion
1980	"Buffalo Soldier"	Bob Marley
1997	"Bury My Heart at Wounded Knee"	Walela
1967	"Castles Made of Sand"	Jimi Hendrix
1986	"Cherokee"	Europe
1960	"Comanche (The Brave Horse)"	Johnny Horton
1997	"Cowboy Dan"	Modest Mouse
2004	"Creek Mary's Blood"	Nightwish
1969	"Custer Died for Your Sins"	Floyd Westerman
1992	"Freedom"	Rage Against the Machine
1980	"Genocide (The Killing of the Buffalo)"	Thin Lizzy
1977	"Indian Man"	The Charlie Daniels Band
1971	"Indian Reservation (The Lament of the Cherokee Reservation Indian)"	Paul Revere & the Raiders
1987	"Indians"	Anthrax
1971	"Indian Sunset"	Elton John
1991	"Little Big Horn"	Running Wild
1973	"The Lone Ranger"	Oscar Brown
2001	"Mick Ryan's Lament"	Tim O'Brien and Robert Dunlap
1960	"Mr. Custer"	Larry Verne
1964	"Now That the Buffalo's Gone"	Buffy Sainte-Marie
1979	"Pocahontas"	Neil Young
1982	"Run to the Hills"	Iron Maiden
1971	"Soldier Blue"	Buffy Sainte-Marie
1962	"Some Fool Made a Soldier of Me"	The Kingston Trio
2001	"Stars And Stripes"	Anti-Flag
1971	"Then Came the White Man"	The Stampeders
2002	"Wampum Prayer"	Tori Amos
1973	"We Were All Wounded at Wounded Knee"	Redbone
1976	"White Man"	Queen

== World War I ==
Year	Song	Artist
1991	"1916"	Motörhead
1999	"1917"	Linda Ronstadt
2014	"Argonne"	Garrison Keillor
2011	"All And Everyone"	PJ Harvey
1982	"All Quiet on the Western Front"	Elton John
1990	"All Together Now"	The Farm
1972	"And the Band Played Waltzing Matilda"	Eric Bogle
1997	"Belleau Wood"	Garth Brooks
1968	"Butcher's Tale (Western Front 1914)"	The Zombies
1985	"Children's Crusade"	Sting
1977	"Christmas 1914"	Mike Harding
1984	"Christmas in the Trenches"	John McCutcheon
2011	"The Colour of the Earth"	PJ Harvey
1917– 1944	"Der Kaiser von Atlantis"	Viktor Ullmann
1980	"Es Ist an der Zeit"	Hannes Wader
1982	"Gallipoli"	The Fureys
2005	"The Green Fields of France"	Dropkick Murphys
2009	"Harry Farr"	Stray
2009	"Harry Patch (In Memory Of)"	Radiohead
1914	"I Didn't Raise My Boy to Be a Soldier"	Peerless Quartet
1918	"Oh! It's a Lovely War"	Ernest Pike and George Baker (baritone)
2011	"On Battleship Hill"	PJ Harvey
2000	"I Fought in a War"	Belle and Sebastian
1996	"It Could Happen Again"	Collin Raye
2015	"Nachts Weinen die Soldaten"	Saltatio Mortis
1976	"No Man's Land" a.k.a. "Green Fields of France"	Eric Bogle
2014	"Nuclear"	Mike Oldfield
1988	"One"	Metallica
2003	"Paschendale"	Iron Maiden
1987	"Remembrance Day"	Bryan Adams
2007	"Scream Aim Fire"	Bullet for My Valentine
1969	"Some Mother's Son"	The Kinks
1914	"Stay Down Here Where You Belong"	Irving Berlin
1980	"Stop the Cavalry"	Jona Lewie
2008	"The Price of a Mile"	Sabaton
1969	"Yes Sir, No Sir"	The Kinks

== Spanish Civil War ==
Year	Song	Artist
1985	"For Whom the Bell Tolls"	Metallica
1998	"If You Tolerate This Your Children Will Be Next"	Manic Street Preachers
1990	"Lorca's Novena"	The Pogues
2003	"Skeletons of Quinto"	The Folksmen
1983	"Sketches of Spain"	The Nits
1979	"Spanish Bombs"	The Clash
1963	"Spanish Civil War Song" (or "Spanish Lament")	Phil Ochs

== World War II ==
Year	Song	Artist
2016	"1944"	Jamala
1984	"Aces High"	Iron Maiden
2004	"Alive With the Glory of Love"	Say Anything
1989	"Ausgebombt"	Sodom
1986	"Angel of Death"	Slayer
1979	"Another Brick in the Wall (Part 1)"	Pink Floyd
1945	"At Mail Call Today"	Gene Autry
1964	"The Ballad of Ira Hayes"	Johnny Cash
2006	"Brighter than a Thousand Suns"	Iron Maiden
1979	"Bring the Boys Back Home"	Pink Floyd
1968	"Corporal Clegg"	Pink Floyd
1986	"Dieppe"	Vilain Pingouin
1980	"Enola Gay"	Orchestral Manoeuvres in the Dark
1979	"Goodbye Blue Sky"	Pink Floyd
1977	"Hiroshima"	Utopia
1979	"In the Flesh"	Pink Floyd
1982	"Kristallnaach"	BAP
2006	"The Longest Day"	Iron Maiden
1985	"Manhattan Project"	Rush
1969	"Mr. Churchill Says"	The Kinks
1984	"Red Sector A"	Rush
1973	"Roads to Moscow"	Al Stewart
1993	"Sullivan"	Caroline's Spine
2010	"Thank You, Mr. Churchill"	Peter Frampton
2022	"Twenties"	Ghost
1943	"Und was bekam des Soldaten Weib?"	Lotte Lenya and Kurt Weill; words by Bertolt Brecht
1979	"Vera"	Pink Floyd
2005	"The War"	Angels and Airwaves
1982	"War Is Hell (On the Homefront Too)"	T.G. Sheppard
2007	"What I've Done"	Linkin Park
1982	"When the Tigers Broke Free"	Pink Floyd

== Cold War and nuclear arms race ==
Year	Song	Artist
1984	"2 Minutes to Midnight"	Iron Maiden
2007	"4 Minute Warning"	Radiohead
1967	"20 Tons of TNT"	Flanders and Swann
1983	"99 Luftballons" and "99 Red Balloons"	Nena
1968	"1983... (A Merman I Should Turn to Be)"	The Jimi Hendrix Experience
1982	"1999"	Prince
1982	"America"	The Au Pairs
1985	"America"	Prince
1991	"The American"	Simple Minds
1984	"Amerika"	Herbert Grönemeyer
1985	"And Then There Were None"	Exodus
1979	"Armageddon"	Prism
1986	"Ask"	The Smiths
1978	"Atomic Bomb"	William Onyeabor
1992	"Atomic Garden"	Bad Religion
1988	"Battalions of Fear"	Blind Guardian
1981	"Battalions of Strangers"	Fischer Z
1984	"Be Not Always"	The Jacksons
1984	"Beyond the Black"	Metal Church
2007	"Big Joe Blues"	Pete Seeger
1988	"Blackened"	Metallica
1992	"Born to End"	Manic Street Preachers
1980	"Breathing"	Kate Bush
2006	"Brighter than a Thousand Suns"	Iron Maiden
1985	"Burning Heart"	Survivor
2010	"Burning in the Skies"	Linkin Park
1971	"Children of the Grave"	Black Sabbath
1986	"Christmas at Ground Zero"	"Weird Al" Yankovic
1982	"Cold War"	Oppenheimer Analysis
2000	"Cold War"	Funker Vogt
1963	"Come Away Melinda"	Harry Belafonte
1960	"Crawl Out Through the Fallout"	Sheldon Allman
1980	"Crazy Train"	Ozzy Osbourne
1981	"Cruise Missiles"	Fischer-Z
1982	"De Bom"	Doe Maar
1984	"De Bom Valt Nooit"	Herman van Veen
1981	"Fire in the Sky"	Saxon
1999	"Destruction Preventer"	Sonata Arctica
1982	"Der Blaue Planet"	Karat
1961	"Do the Russians Want War?" ("Хотят ли русские войны?")	Mark Bernes
2008	"Down From the Sky"	Trivium
1981	"Dumb All Over"	Frank Zappa
1988	"Eagle Fly Free"	Helloween
1983	"East at Easter"	Simple Minds
1982	"Ein Bißchen Frieden"	Nicole Seibert
1970	"Electric Funeral"	Black Sabbath
1969	"Epitaph"	King Crimson
1965	"Eve of Destruction"	P.F. Sloan (also recorded by Barry McGuire and The Turtles)
1984	"Every Bomb You Make"	The Police
1985	"Everybody Wants to Rule the World"	Tears for Fears
1989	"Fabulous Disaster"	Exodus
1988	"Fallout"	Liege Lord
1990	"Famous Last Words"	Tears for Fears
1984	"Fight Fire with Fire"	Metallica
1980	"Final Day"	Young Marble Giants
1984	"Forever Young"	Alphaville
2005	"Fuel the Hate"	Soulfly
1974	"Future Legend"	David Bowie
1986	"The Future's So Bright, I Gotta Wear Shades"	Timbuk3
1980	"Fylingdale Flyer"	Jethro Tull
1980	"Going Underground"	The Jam
1994	"A Great Day for Freedom"	Pink Floyd
1984	"Hammer to Fall"	Queen
1962	"A Hard Rain's A-Gonna Fall"	Bob Dylan
1982	"Heatwave"	Fay Ray
1971	"Hiroshima"	Wishful Thinking
1966	"I Come and Stand at Every Door" (based on a poem by Nazım Hikmet)	Pete Seeger
1983	"I Won't Let the Sun Go Down on Me"	Nik Kershaw
1982	"I've Known No War"	The Who
1983	"It's a Mistake"	Men at Work
1988	"Killing Fields"	Scanner
1986	"Killer of Giants"	Ozzy Osbourne
1973	"Kuiama"	Electric Light Orchestra
1986	"Land of Confusion"	Genesis
1986	"Legacy of Morons"	The Trilobites
1989	"Leningrad"	Billy Joel
1986	"Let Us Begin"	John Denver with Alexander Gradsky
1981	"Let's All Make a Bomb"	Heaven 17
1980	"Living Through Another Cuba"	XTC
1985	"Manhattan Project"	Rush
1984	"Minutes to Midnight"	Midnight Oil
1965	"MLF Lullaby"	Tom Lehrer
1985	"Mothers Talk"	Tears For Fears
1983	"Moya"	Southern Death Cult
1981	"Mutually Assured Destruction"	Gillan
1983	"New Year's Day"	U2
1985	"Nikita"	Elton John
1986	"No Nuclear War"	Peter Tosh
2007	"No One Would Riot for Less"	Bright Eyes
1987	"Nuclear War"	Nuclear Assault
1987	"Nuclear Winter"	Sodom
2000	"Nuclear Winter"	Funker Vogt
1982	"Nuku Pommiin"	Kojo
1946	"Old Man Atom"	Vern Partlow
1988	"Part IV (The Index Fossil)"	Bad Religion
1985	"Party at Ground Zero"	Fishbone
1988	"Pre-War America"	The Beatnigs
1987	"Protect and Survive"	The Dubliners
1982	"Radiance"	Oppenheimer Analysis
1987	"Radio K.A.O.S."	Roger Waters
1986	"Ready or Not"	Bananarama
1982	"Red Skies"	The Fixx
1981	"Red Skies over Paradise"	Fischer-Z
1990	"Reduced to Ash"	Annihilator
1979	"Remember Russia"	Fischer-Z
1990	"Right Here, Right Now"	Jesus Jones
1983	"Rival Leaders"	The Exploited
2009	"Ruination"	Job for a Cowboy
1985	"Russians"	Sting
1990	"Rust in Peace... Polaris"	Megadeth
1986	"SDI"	Bonfire
1983	"Seconds"	U2
1988	"Set the World Afire"	Megadeth
1980	"Seven Minutes to Midnight"	Wah! Heat
1987	"Showdown at Big Sky"	Robbie Robertson
1984	"Since Yesterday"	Strawberry Switchblade
1965	"So Long, Mom (A Song for World War III)"	Tom Lehrer
1983	"Somethin's Goin' On"	Ian Hunter
1983	"Sonderzug nach Pankow"	Udo Lindenberg
1983	"Standing in the Dark"	Platinum Blonde
1963	"The Sun Is Burning"	Ian Campbell Folk Group
1988	"Surfin' USSR"	Ray Stevens
1986	"Survival of the Fittest"	Slave Raider
1957	"Talking Atom"	Oscar Brand
1986	"Thank God for the Bomb"	Ozzy Osbourne
1979	"They've Got a Bomb"	Crass
1954	"Thirteen Women and Only One Man in Town"	Bill Haley and the Comets
1983	"Time After Time"	Electric Light Orchestra
1983	"Two Suns in the Sunset"	Pink Floyd
1984	"Two Tribes"	Frankie Goes to Hollywood
1982	"US Forces"	Midnight Oil
1983	"Vamos a la playa"	Righeira
1983	"Walking in Your Footsteps"	The Police
1985	"Warnings Moving Clockwise"	Do-Re-Mi
1987	"Wartime"	Pentagram
1984	"Watching Joey Glow"	Steve Goodman
1966	"Welterusten meneer de president"	Boudewijn de Groot
1959	"We Will All Go Together"	Tom Lehrer
1986	"When the Wind Blows"	David Bowie
1991	"When Two Worlds Collide"	Simple Minds
1965	"Who's Next?"	Tom Lehrer
1982	"Why Did I Fall for That?"	The Who
1986	"Воля и Разум" ("Will And Reason")	Aria
1985	"Will the Sun Rise"	Dokken
1990	"Wind of Change"	Scorpions
1988	"World Leader Pretend"	R.E.M.
1984	"World War III"	Grandmaster Melle Mel and the Furious Five
1980	"Ivan Meets G.I. Joe"	The Clash

== Vietnam War ==
Year	Song	Artist
1966	"7 O'Clock News/Silent Night"	Simon & Garfunkel
1985	"19"	Paul Hardcastle
1968	"2 + 2 = ?"	Bob Seger System
1969	"21st Century Schizoid Man"	King Crimson
1971	"A Summer Prayer for Peace"	The Archies
1973	"Aladdin Sane"	David Bowie
1967	"Alice's Restaurant Massacree"	Arlo Guthrie
2010	"American Scream"	Alkaline Trio
1986	"Black Wall"	Dennis DeYoung
1970	"Ball of Confusion (That's What the World Is Today)"	The Temptations
1972	"The Ballad of Penny Evans"	Steve Goodman
1984	"Born in the USA"	Bruce Springsteen
1977	"Born on the Fourth of July"	Tom Paxton
1971	"Bring the Boys Home"	Freda Payne
1966	"Bring Them Home"	Pete Seeger
1965	"Business Goes on As Usual"	Chad Mitchell Trio
1984	"The Captain"	Leonard Cohen
1966	"C'era Un Ragazzo Che Come Me Amava I Beatles E I Rolling Stones"	Gianni Morandi
1970	"Child in Time"	Deep Purple
1989	"Compulsory Hero"	1927 (band)
1988	"Copperhead Road"	Steve Earle
1965	"Dear Uncle Sam"	Loretta Lynn
1969	"Declaration"	The Fifth Dimension
1969	"Disk of Sun"	Ewan MacColl
1968	"Draft Morning"	The Byrds
1970	"Draft Resister"	Steppenwolf
1995	"The Edge of Darkness"	Iron Maiden
1965	"Eve of Destruction"	Barry McGuire and P.F. Sloan
1969	"The Fiddle and the Drum"	Joni Mitchell
1967	"I-Feel-Like-I'm-Fixin'-to-Die Rag" / "Fixin to Die Rag"	Country Joe McDonald
1967	"For What It's Worth"	Buffalo Springfield
1969	"Fortunate Son"	Creedence Clearwater Revival
1970	"Frightened Lady"	The Hollies
1977	"Front Line"	Stevie Wonder
1966	"Get It While You Can"	Janis Joplin
1969	"Gimme Shelter"	Rolling Stones
1969	"Give Peace a Chance"	The Plastic Ono Band
1972	"Golden Ribbons"	Loggins and Messina
1981	"Goodnight Saigon"	Billy Joel
1971	"The Grave"	Don McLean
1972	"The Great Compromise"	John Prine
1972	"Guns, Guns, Guns"	The Guess Who
1970	"Hand of Doom"	Black Sabbath
1973	"Hallelujah Day"	Jackson 5
1971	"Happy Xmas (War Is Over)"	John Lennon & Yoko Ono/The Plastic Ono Band
1965	"I Ain't Marching Anymore"	Phil Ochs
1968	"I Don't Wanna Go to Vietnam"	John Lee Hooker
1970	"I Should Be Proud"	Martha and the Vandellas
1983	"I Was Only 19 (A Walk in the Light Green)"	Redgum
1971	"I'd Love to Change the World"	Ten Years After
1970	"I'm Your Captain (Closer to Home)"	Grand Funk Railroad
1981	"In the Army Now"	Status Quo
1968	"Kay"	John Wesley Ryles
1978	"Khe Sanh"	Cold Chisel
1966	"Kill for Peace"	The Fugs
1970	"Kill Your Sons"	Lou Reed
1974	"La La Peace Song"	Al Wilson, O. C. Smith
1970	"Last Train to Nuremberg"	Pete Seeger
1970	"Lay Down (Candles in the Rain)"	Melanie Safka
1973	"Luang Prabang"	Dave Van Ronk
1965	"Lyndon Johnson Told the Nation"	Tom Paxton
1970	"Machine Gun"	Jimi Hendrix
1970	"Mama Bake a Pie (Daddy Kill a Chicken)"	Tom T. Hall
1971	"Man in Black"	Johnny Cash
1973	"March to the Witch's Castle"	Funkadelic
1969	"Monster"	Steppenwolf
1971	"Moratorium"	Buffy Sainte-Marie
1989	"More Than A Name On A Wall"	The Statler Brothers
1966	"My Name Is Lisa Kalvelage"	Pete Seeger
1966	"My Son John"	Tom Paxton
1972	"Napalm Sticks to Kids"	Covered Wagon Musicians
1972	"Now or Never"	Yoko Ono
1985	"Old Hippie"	The Bellamy Brothers
1967	"On the Path of Glory"	Petula Clark
1964	"One More Parade"	Phil Ochs
1971	"One Tin Soldier"	Coven
1988	"Orange Crush"	R.E.M.
1972	"The Patriot's Dream"	Gordon Lightfoot
1971	"People, Let's Stop the War"	Grand Funk Railroad
1968	"Por Vietnam"	Quilapayún
1982	"Pull Out The Pin"	Kate Bush
1970	"Question"	The Moody Blues
1972	"Readjustment Blues"	John Denver
1967	"Requiem for the Masses"	The Association
1992	"Rooster"	Alice in Chains
1970	"Running Gun Blues"	David Bowie
1967	"Saigon Bride"	Joan Baez
1971	"Sam Stone"	John Prine
1970	"Silent Homecoming"	Ringo Starr
1968	"Simple Song of Freedom"	Bobby Darin
1971	"Singing in Vietnam Talking Blues"	Johnny Cash
1970	"Sit Down Young Stranger"	Gordon Lightfoot
1971	"Six White Horses"	Waylon Jennings
1968	"Sky Pilot"	Eric Burdon and the Animals
1969	"Smiley"	Ronnie Burns
1976	"Soldier"	Stephen Stills
1990	"Something to Believe In"	Poison
1969	"Someday (August 29, 1968)"	Chicago
1983	"Song for the Dead"	Randy Newman
1982	"Still in Saigon"	The Charlie Daniels Band
1970	"Stoned Love"	The Supremes
1969	"Story of Isaac"	Leonard Cohen
1971	"Student Demonstration Time"	The Beach Boys
1971	"Sunshine"	Jonathan Edwards
1967	"Super Bird"	Country Joe and the Fish
1969	"Sweet Cherry Wine"	Tommy James and the Shondells
1967	"Take It Back"	Cream
1964	"Talkin' Vietnam"	Phil Ochs
1968	"Talking Vietnam Potluck Blues"	Tom Paxton
1968	"Three-Five-Zero-Zero"	from the musical, Hair
1969	"To Susan on the West Coast Waiting"	Donovan
2002	"Travelin' Soldier"	The Chicks
1968	"The Unknown Soldier"	The Doors
1984	"Viet Nam"	Minutemen
1966	"Vietcong Blues"	Junior Wells
1962	"Vietnam"	Phil Ochs
1970	"Vietnam"	Jimmy Cliff
1966	"Vietnam Blues"	Kris Kristofferson
1967	"Waist Deep in the Big Muddy"	Pete Seeger
1970	"War"	Edwin Starr
1968	"War Games"	The Monkees
1965	"The War Drags On"	Donovan
1968	"The War Is Over"	Phil Ochs
1971	"War Movie"	Jefferson Airplane
1970	"War Pigs"	Black Sabbath
1969	"Wasted Words"	The Motions with Robbie van Leeuwen
1965	"We Didn't Know"	Tom Paxton
1966	"Welterusten meneer de president (Sleep Well Mr. President)"	Boudewijn de Groot
1964	"What Did You Learn in School Today?"	Tom Paxton
1971	"What's Going On"	Marvin Gaye
1973	"Where Are You Now, My Son?"	Joan Baez
1968	"White Boots Marching in a Yellow Land"	Phil Ochs
1972	"Why Can't We Live Together"	Timmy Thomas
1965	"The Willing Conscript"	Tom Paxton
1969	"Wooden Ships"	Crosby, Stills & Nash and Jefferson Airplane
1970	"Woodstock"	Joni Mitchell and Crosby, Stills, Nash & Young
1971	"Your Flag Decal Won't Get You Into Heaven Anymore"	John Prine
1971	"Yours Is No Disgrace"	Yes
1967	“The Windows of the World”	Dionne Warwick
1981	"Straight to Hell"	The Clash
1966	"Last Train to Clarksville"	The Monkees

== Dominican Civil War ==
Year	Song	Artist
1966	"The Marines Have Landed on the Shores of Santo Domingo"	Phil Ochs

== Turkish invasion of Cyprus ==
Year	Song	Artist
1976	"Panagia Mou, Panagia Mou"	Mariza Koch and Michael Fotiades

== Sino-Vietnamese War ==
Year	Song	Artist
1987	"Last Shot"	Cui Jian

== Soviet-Afghan War ==
Year	Song	Artist
1980	"Bombs Away"	The Police
1986	"Versante est"	Litfiba
1988	"Группа крови" ("Blood Type")	Kino
1988	"Афганский синдром" ("Afghan Syndrome")	Instruktsiya po Vyzhivaniyu
1988	"Мы Уходим" ("We're Leaving)	VIA Kaskad

== Iran-Iraq War ==
Year	Song	Artist
1988	Solh ("Peace")	Hassan Shamaizadeh, Elaheh, Fataneh
1988	Tanin E Solh ("The Peace Resonance")	Moein, Morteza, Fataneh, Andy, Kouros, Elton Ahi

== The Troubles of Northern Ireland ==
Year	Song	Artist
1978	"78 RPM"	Stiff Little Fingers
1978	"90 Miles From Dublin"	Christy Moore
1978	"Alternative Ulster"	Stiff Little Fingers
1991	"La Ballade Nord-Irlandaise"	Renaud
1995	"Belfast"	Elton John
1989	"Belfast Child"	Simple Minds
1979	"Bloody Sunday"	Stiff Little Fingers
1994	"Bomb"	Bush
1986	"Corridor of Cells"	Test Dept
1982	"Damned to Be Free"	Bad Religion
2002	"Drunken Lullabies"	Flogging Molly
1989	"Easter"	Marillion
1979	"Ether"	Gang of Four
1980	"Fly the Flag"	Stiff Little Fingers
1983	"Forgotten Sons"	Marillion
1967	"Four Green Fields"	Tommy Makem
1989	"Get Out of Ireland"	Blaggers ITA
2012	"Get Your Dead Hand Off My Shoulder"	Therapy?
1972	"Give Ireland Back to the Irish"	Paul McCartney and Wings
1998	"Heal This Land"	Maire Brennan
1990	"Holy Wars...The Punishment Due"	Megadeth
1983	"The House of Orange"	Stan Rogers
1976	"If They Come in the Morning" a.k.a. "No Time for Love"	Jack Warshaw
1979	"Into the Valley"	Skids
1981	"Invisible Sun"	The Police
1985	"The Island"	Paul Brady
1981	"It's Going to Happen!"	The Undertones
1983	"Like a Song"	U2
1992	"Look Mum, No Hands!"	Carter the Unstoppable Sex Machine
1996	"Minds Locked Shut"	Christy Moore
1982	"The More I See (The Less I Believe)"	Fun Boy Three
1984	"My Youngest Son Came Home Today"	Mary Black
1979	"No More of That"	Stiff Little Fingers
1995	"North And South of the River"	Christy Moore
1979	"Oliver's Army"	Elvis Costello and the Attractions
1985	"Out in the Fields"	Gary Moore and Phil Lynott
1999	"Paper Sun"	Def Leppard
2000	"Peace on Earth"	U2
1997	"Please"	U2
1978	"The Saints Are Coming"	The Skids
1987	"Scaling the Derry Wall"	The Exploited
1983	"Section 31"	Christy Moore
1979	"State of Emergency"	Stiff Little Fingers
1988	"Streets of Sorrow/Birmingham Six"	The Pogues
1972	"Sunday Bloody Sunday"	John Lennon and Yoko Ono
1983	"Sunday Bloody Sunday"	U2
1998	"Sunrise"	The Divine Comedy
1992	"Ten Men Dead"	Blaggers ITA
1989	"That's Just the Way It Is"	Phil Collins
1985	"There Were Roses"	Tommy Sands
1997	"This Is Not Your Country"	Morrissey
1986	"Through the Barricades"	Spandau Ballet
1973	"The Town I Loved So Well"	Phil Coulter
1981	"Troops Out"	The Passage
1977	"Ulster"	Sham 69
1978	"Wasted Life"	Stiff Little Fingers
1993	"We Wait and We Wonder"	Phil Collins
1987	"Wild Frontier"	Gary Moore
1972	“Soldier”	Harvey Andrews
1994	"Zombie"	The Cranberries

== Falklands War ==
Year	Song	Artist
1995	"2 de Abril"	Attaque 77
1991	"Another Man's Cause"	Levellers
1990	"The Ballad of Robbie Jones"	Levellers
1982	"Blue Skinned Beast"	Madness
1985	"Brothers in Arms"	Dire Straits
1998	"Como Estais Amigos"	Iron Maiden
1988	"Company Policy"	Martin Carthy
1985	"Comunicado #166"	Los Violadores
1983	"Death 'N' Glory Boys"	Ian Hunter
1985	"Eddie"	Latin Quarter
1982	"El Banquete"	Virus
1998	"El Visitante"	Almafuerte
1983	"Get Your Filthy Hands Off My Desert"	Pink Floyd
1984	"Island of No Return"	Billy Bragg
1983	"La Isla De La Buena Memoria"	Alejandro Lerner
1983	"Let's Start a War"	The Exploited
1982	"No Bombardeen Buenos Aires"	Charly Garcia
1983	"The Post War Dream"	Pink Floyd
1982	"Postkort Fra Port Stanley"	C.V. Jørgensen
1983	"Reina Madre"	Raúl Porchetto
1983	"The Right Side Won"	What Fun!
1982	"Sheep Farming in the Falklands"	Crass
1983	"Shipbuilding"	Elvis Costello and the Attractions
1983	"Southampton Dock"	Pink Floyd
1986	"Tango Atlantico"	Joe Jackson
1984	"Spirit of the Falklands"	New Model Army
1984	"Wha Dat"	Yellowman
1983	"Yes Sir, I Will"	Crass

== Contras, Latin America ==
Year	Song	Artist
1984	"All She Wants to Do Is Dance"	Don Henley
1982	"Bleed for Me"	Dead Kennedys
1987	"Bullet the Blue Sky"	U2
1983	"El Salvador"	Cybotron
1983	"El Salvador"	Noel Stookey and Jim Wallis
1985	"El Salvador"	White Lion
1986	"The Flowers of Guatemala"	R.E.M.
1984	"If I Had a Rocket Launcher"	Bruce Cockburn
1985	"Lives in the Balance"	Jackson Browne
1987	“Mothers of the Disappeared”	U2
1984	"Nicaragua"	Bruce Cockburn
1990	"Nicaragua, Nicaraguita"	Billy Bragg
1984	"No Más!"	John McCutcheon
2007	"Student Visas"	Corb Lund
1984	"Untitled Song for Latin America"	Minutemen
1980	"Washington Bullets"	The Clash
1989	"Wish I Was in El Salvador"	Jello Biafra with DOA

== Nagorno-Karabakh conflict ==
Year	Song	Artist
2020	"Genocidal Humanoidz"	System of a Down
2020	"Protect the Land"	System of a Down

== Yugoslav Wars ==
Year	Song	Artist
1992	"Bili Cvitak" ("White flower")	Jura Stublić
1996	"Bosnia"	The Cranberries
1997	"Bosnia"	Spinetta y Los Socios del Desierto
1995	"Christmas Eve/Sarajevo 12/24"	Trans-Siberian Orchestra
1993	"Čovek Sa Mesecom U Očima"	Đorđe Balašević
1994	"Crv"	Angel's Breath
1995	"Dead Winter Dead"	Savatage
2000	"Dok Gori Nebo Nad Novim Sadom"	Đorđe Balašević
1993	"Gde Si"	Bajaga i Instruktori
1991	"Isabelle"	Greg Johnson
1995	"Kad Sve Ovo Bude Juče"	Dino Merlin
1993	"Krivi Smo Mi"	Đorđe Balašević
1997	"Lucky"	Radiohead
1995	"Miss Sarajevo"	Passengers
1991	"Nebo, Nebo Pplavo Je"	Obojeni Program
1995	"Neću III Svetski"	Babe
2006	"No Bravery"	James Blunt
1993	"Ovo Je Balkan"	Bajaga i Instruktori
1995	"Peppers And Tomatoes"	Ralph McTell
1995	"Prayer of the Children"	Kurt Bestor
1999	"Pretty Good Day"	Loudon Wainwright III
1995	"Pure Massacre"	Silverchair
1996	"Regruteska"	Đorđe Balašević
1993	"Schöne Neue Welt"	Böhse Onkelz
2000	"Sevdalinka"	Đorđe Balašević
1992	"Slušaj 'Vamo"	Rimtutituki
1991	"Stop the War in Croatia"	Tomislav Ivčić
1995	"Vrbana Bridge"	Jill Sobule

== Gulf Wars, Iraq, 9/11, and the war on terror ==
Year	Song	Artist
2009	"21 Guns"	Green Day
2002	"911"	Gorillaz and D12
2002	"911 for Peace"	Anti-Flag
2008	"20 Dollar Nose Bleed"	Fall Out Boy
2004	"Act III Scene 2 (Shakespeare)"	Saul Williams
2003	"Aftermath"	Strapping Young Lad
2005	"All the Young Fascists"	Shihad
2004	"All These Things That I've Done"	The Killers
2005	"America First"	Merle Haggard
2004	"American Idiot"	Green Day
1993	"American Jesus"	Bad Religion
2003	"American Life"	Madonna
2004	"Amerika"	Rammstein
2007	"Amerikhastan"	Megadeth
2009	"Another Bag of Bones"	Kevin Devine
2004	"Apocalypse Please"	Muse
2019	"Arabesque"	Coldplay
1992	"Architecture of Aggression"	Megadeth
2007	"As It Was, As It Soon Shall Be"	Exodus
2004	"Ashes of the Wake"	Lamb of God
1992	"Atomic Garden"	Bad Religion
2008	"Audience of One"	Rise Against
2000	"B.O.B"	Outkast
2005	"B.Y.O.B."	System of a Down
1991	"New Damage"	Soundgarden
1991	"Baghdad"	The Offspring
2005	"Bin Laden"	Immortal Technique
2007	"Black Rain"	Ozzy Osbourne
2008	"Blessed Are the Landmines"	Brave Saint Saturn
2007	"Bloodsports"	New Model Army
1990	"Bloodtrails"	Sodom (band)
2003	"Blood on Your Hands"	The Proclaimers
2002	"Boom!"	System of a Down
1992	"The Bravery of Being Out of Range"	Roger Waters
2006	"Brother's Song"	Brand New
2004	"Cambaz"	Mor ve Ötesi
2005	"Camilo"	State Radio
2008	"Can't Happen Here"	Atreyu
2004	"Caped Crusader"	Jello Biafra with the Melvins
2007	"Capital G"	Nine Inch Nails
2007	"Captain Sterling's Little Problem"	The Coup
2003	"The Cause of Death"	Immortal Technique
2008	"Cheney's Toy"	James McMurtry
2004	"Cinnamon Girl"	Prince
2009	"Civilian Ways"	Rancid
2007	"Clenching the Fists of Dissent"	Machine Head
2004	"Condi, Condi"	Steve Earle
2008	"Confrontation"	OTEP
2009	"Contractor"	Lamb of God
2004	"Counting Bodies Like Sheep to the Rhythm of the War Drums"	A Perfect Circle
2007	"Dad's Gonna Kill Me"	Richard Thompson
2006	"Dangerous Game"	Bill Madden
2007	"Dark Side of the Sun"	Tori Amos
2004	"Day After Tomorrow"	Tom Waits
2007	"Dead Man Walking"	Bloodsimple
2004	"Dear America"	N.EX.T (featuring Psy)
2007	"Dear Mr. President"	Pink
2004	"Deja Vu (All Over Again)"	John Fogerty
2003	"Der Sheriff"	Deutsch Amerikanische Freundschaft
1991	"Desert Angel"	Stevie Nicks
2005	"Devils & Dust"	Bruce Springsteen
2008	"Devour"	Shinedown
1991	"Die for Oil Sucker"	Jello Biafra
2006	"Dirty Bombs"	Body Count
2005	"Dirty Harry"	Gorillaz
2002	"Don't Bomb When You're the Bomb"	Blur
2007	"Don't Make Me a Target"	Spoon
2008	"Down From the Sky"	Trivium
1993	"A Drug Against War"	KMFDM
2008	"The Drums of War"	Jackson Browne
1999	"Easily"	Red Hot Chili Peppers
2004	"The Empire Strikes First"	Bad Religion
2007	"Empty Walls"	Serj Tankian
2003	"Ether"	Nothingface
2006	"Everybody's Gone to War"	Nerina Pallot
2004	"Everybody Wake Up (Our Finest Hour Arrives)"	Dave Matthews Band
2006	"Exit Strategy"	Valient Thorr
2003	"Façade of Reality"	Epica
2003	"Fall Dog Bombs the Moon"	David Bowie
2009	"Far From Home"	Five Finger Death Punch
2007	"A Farewell to Arms"	Machine Head
1992	"Afraid to Shoot Strangers"	Iron Maiden
1991	"Fertile Crescent"	Bad Religion
2004	"Final Straw"	R.E.M.
2006	"Final Transmission"	Street Dogs
2006	"For the Greater Good of God"	Iron Maiden
2003	"Franco Un-American"	NOFX
2008	"Friends in the Armed Forces"	Thursday
2005	"Frontlines"	Soulfly
2009	"Fuck You"	Lily Allen
2006	"Fun And Games"	Barenaked Ladies
2007	"George W. Told the Nation"	Tom Paxton
2006	"The Getaway"	Voivod
2005	"God's Army"	Smile Empty Soul
2003	"Good Song"	Blur
2009	"Ground Zero"	Chris Cornell
1994	"Gulf War Song"	Moxy Früvous
2007	"Gunslinger"	Avenged Sevenfold
2008	"Hammerhead"	The Offspring
2005	"The Hand That Feeds"	Nine Inch Nails
2007	"Hands Held High"	Linkin Park
2006	"Hard-On for War"	Mudhoney
2006	"Harrowdown Hill"	Thom Yorke
1992	"Heaven Is Falling"	Bad Religion
2012	"Hell Broke Luce"	Tom Waits
1992	"Hero"	Ministry
2008	"Hero of War"	Rise Against
2008	"Hey Ma"	James
1991	"Highwire"	The Rolling Stones
2004	"Holiday"	Green Day
2006	"The Holidays Are Here (And We're Still at War)"	Brett Dennen
1991	"Holy War"	Matthew Sweet
2008	"Home Front"	Drive-By Truckers
2004	"Home to Houston"	Steve Earle
1991	"How Much Longer"	Paul Leary
2007	"I Can't Take It No More"	John Fogerty
2003	"I Will"	Radiohead
2006	"If This Is Goodbye"	Mark Knopfler with Emmylou Harris
2004	"If Wishes Were Horses"	David Baerwald
2007	"Illegal Attacks"	Ian Brown
2003	"In a World Gone Mad"	Beastie Boys
2003	"Into the Fire"	Bruce Springsteen
2007	“Intervention”	Arcade Fire
2006	"Is It Any Wonder?"	Keane
2002	"Jacob's Ladder"	Chumbawamba
2002	"Jerusalem"	Steve Earle
2002	"John Walker's Blues"	Steve Earle
2009	"Kid Next Door"	The Bottle Rockets
2004	"Kimdir O"	Barış Akarsu
2007	"Last to Die"	Bruce Springsteen
2004	"Leaving Beirut"	Roger Waters
2004	"Left Right"	The Chemical Brothers
2004	"Let Them Eat War"	Bad Religion
2011	"Let's Be Real"	Soulja Boy
2003	"Let's Get Free"	Sheryl Crow
2006	"Let's Impeach the President"	Neil Young
2002	"Let's Roll"	Neil Young
2006	"Letter From Iraq"	Bouncing Souls
2004	"Letters From Home"	John Michael Montgomery
2006	"Lift the Veil, Kiss the Tank"	The Blood Brothers
2006	"Light Up Ya Lighter"	Michael Franti
2007	"The Little Things Give You Away"	Linkin Park
2008	"Love Me, I'm a Liberal"	Kevin Devine
2001	"Makeshift Patriot"	Sage Francis
2006	"Mama"	Godsmack
2004	"The Man Who Would Be King"	Dio
2002	"Manhattan-Kaboul"	Axelle Red and Renaud
2004	"The Mob Goes Wild"	Clutch
2004	"Mosh"	Eminem
2003	"New Killer Star"	David Bowie
2006	"No End in Sight"	Toto (band)
2006	"No More"	Bob Seger
2005	"No Sure Way"	Loudon Wainwright III
2005	"No Time Flat"	Kevin Devine
2003	"No War"	Esham
2003	"Not in My Name"	Saul Williams
2003	"Nothing Man"	Bruce Springsteen
2004	"Now You've Got Something to Die For"	Lamb of God
2011	"On the Backs of Angels"	Dream Theater
2007	"On With the Song"	Mary Chapin Carpenter
2003	"Out of Time"	Blur
2005	"Overburdened"	Disturbed
2003	"Paradise"	Bruce Springsteen
2009	"People of the Lie"	KMFDM
2002	"Politik"	Coldplay
2003	"The Price of Oil"	Billy Bragg
2006	"Pulse of the Maggots"	Slipknot
2017	"Refuge"	Steven Wilson
2004	"Rich Man's War"	Steve Earle
2002	"The Rising"	Bruce Springsteen
2007	"Rumors of War"	High on Fire
2007	"S-O-R-R-Y"	The Proclaimers
2005	"Sacred Lie"	Disturbed
2005	"Sacrificed Sons"	Dream Theater
2006	"Shock And Awe"	Neil Young
2003	"Sick City Sometimes"	Buzzcocks
2005	"Sixteen Military Wives"	The Decemberists
2002	"Skylines And Turnstiles"	My Chemical Romance
1991	"Slap Leather"	James Taylor
2008	"Sleep Through the Static"	Jack Johnson
2005	"The Sodom And Gomorrah Show"	Pet Shop Boys
2014	"A Song to Stifle Imperial Progress"	The Used
2002	"Square Dance"	Eminem
2007	"Stand Up"	Flobots
2002	"Still Waiting"	Sum 41
1992	"Such a War Has Never Been"	Les Barker/Martin Carthy
2004	"Support Our Troops OH! (Black Angels OH!)"	Xiu Xiu
2007	"Sweet Neo Con"	The Rolling Stones
2008	"That Man I Shot"	Drive-By Truckers
2003	"This Is War"	Smile Empty Soul
2016	"The Threat Is Real"	Megadeth
2004	"To Kill the Child"	Roger Waters
1992	"Too Much Rope"	Roger Waters
2006	"Trot Out the Dead"	Hammers of Misfortune
1994	"Turkey Shoot"	Killdozer
2005	"Twenty"	Robert Cray
2006	"Two Weeks From Twenty"	Yellowcard
2004	"Unknown Soldier"	The Casualties
2011	"Victory Stinks"	Jello Biafra and the Guantanamo School of Medicine
2006	"Waiting on the World to Change"	John Mayer
2003	"Walk On"	Hilltop Hoods
2007	"War"	Emigrate
1994	"War Again"	Oingo Boingo
2003	"War All the Time"	Thursday (band)
2002	"War on War"	Wilco
1992	"Wargasm"	L7
2008	“Warm Winter”	Seth Sentry
2012	"Warzone"	Pagoda
2013	"Waves"	Portugal. the Man
2004	"We're All to Blame"	Sum 41
2003	"What Are We Fighting For"	Live
2005	"When the President Talks to God"	Bright Eyes
2004	"Where Is the Love?"	The Black Eyed Peas (Featuring Justin Timberlake)
2001	"Where Were You (When the World Stopped Turning)"	Alan Jackson
2006	"Where'd You Go"	Fort Minor
2007	"Would You Be Impressed"	Streetlight Manifesto
2010	"White Flag Warrior"	Flobots ft. Tim McIlrath
2007	"White People for Peace"	Against Me!
2011	"Words I Never Said"	Lupe Fiasco
2006	"World Wide Suicide"	Pearl Jam
2003	"WWIII"	KMFDM
1992	"Yellow Ledbetter"	Pearl Jam
2006	"Yellowcake"	Ministry
2007	"Yo George"	Tori Amos
1991	"You Shoulda Killed Me Last Year"	Ice-T
2003	"Your Silence"	Suicide Machines
2005	"Zerstören"	Rammstein

== Israeli-Palestinian conflict ==
Year	Song	Artist
1967	"Zahrat al-Mada'en"	Fairuz
1985	"Ya Falasteeniyah"	Sheikh Imam
1988	"Under Sions Kalla Stjärna" (Under The Cold Star Of Zion)	Björn Afzelius
1995	"Israel's Son"	Silverchair
1998	"Every Grain of Palestinian Sand"	Muslimgauze
2001	"Min Erhabi"	DAM
2002	"Intifada"	Ska-P
2008	"One Day"	Matisyahu
2011	"Words I Never Said"	Lupe Fiasco
2012	"Occupied Tears"	Serj Tankian
2019	"Cavalry"	Mashrou' Leila
2021	"Inn Ann"	Daboor & Shabjdeed
2023	"Rajieen"	Multiple artists
2023	"Harbu Darbu"	Ness and Stilla
2024	"Deira"	Saint Levant & MC Abdul
2024	"From the River (من النهر)"	Ethel Cain
2024	"Hind's Hall"	Macklemore
2024	"Hind's Hall 2"	Macklemore (featuring Anees, MC Abdul, Amer Zahr)
2024	"Karmageddon"	Iyah May
2024	"Palestine Will Rise"	Abe Batshon, Samer & Sammy Shiblaq
2024	"Voice of a Child"	Eric Clapton
2024	"War Isn't Murder"	Jesse Welles
2024	"Gaza is Calling"	Mustafa the Poet
2025	"Fucked Up"	Macklemore
2025	"Over Jerusalem"	Jethro Tull
2026	"Palestine"	Kneecap

== Russian invasion of Ukraine ==
Year	Song	Artist
2022	"12"	Morgenshtern
2022	"Buczy"	Pidżama Porno
2023	"Crushed"	Imagine Dragons
2022	"Don't Give Up"	Erekle Getsadze and Helen Kalandadze
2022	"Не стреляйте" ("Don’t Shoot")	Zemfira
2022	"Freedom"	Tvorchi
2023	"GASOLINE"	Måneskin
2022	"Generation Cancellation"	Little Big
2022	"Hey, Hey, Rise Up!"	Pink Floyd ft. Andriy Khlyvnyuk
2022	"I'm Alive"	Ruslana
2022	"Imagine"	Julian Lennon ft. Nuno Bettencourt
2022	"Kalyna"	Go_A
2022	"Love Is All We Got"	The Roop
2022 (Note: The song had been previously released but was re-released with amended lyrics to raise money to support charities aiding those affected by the conflict.)	"Mistsya shchaslyvykh lyudey" (Місця щасливих людей)	Skryabin (Note: Features uncredited vocals from Oleksandra Zaritska, Artem Pivovarov, Sergii Tanchynets, Fahot, Nataliya Mogylevska, Ivan NAVI, and Ruslana.)
2023	"Mama ŠČ!"	Let 3
2022	"Nasze Domy"	Kalush Orchestra and Szpaku
2022	"Ne zalyshay" (Не залишай)	Anna Trincher
2022	"Nezlamna" (Незламна)	Zlata Dziunka
2022	"Oyda"	Oxxxymiron
2023	"PODNHA" ("Motherland")	Zemfira
2022	"Soldier"	Manizha
2022	"Stefania"	Kalush Orchestra
2023	"Stiny" (Стіни)	Kalush Orchestra and Jerry Heil
2023	"Tango"	Tananai
2022	"What They Fighting For?"	EES ft. Ras Sheehama
2023	"Kyiv"	Lebanon Hanover

== Anti-draft ==
Year	Song	Artist
1967	"Alice's Restaurant Massacree"	Arlo Guthrie
1989	"Black Steel in the Hour of Chaos"	Public Enemy
1974	"Botas Locas"	Sui Generis
1980	"The Call Up"	The Clash
1965	"Draft Dodger Rag"	Phil Ochs
1967	"Draft Morning"	The Byrds
1969	"Draft Resister"	Steppenwolf
1969	"Fortunate Son"	Creedence Clearwater Revival
1981	"I Don't Wanna Get Drafted"	Frank Zappa
1986	"Nein, meine Söhne geb' ich nicht" ("No, I Will Not Give [You] My Sons")	Reinhard Mey
1971	"One Man Rock And Roll Band"	Roy Harper
1994	"Refuse/Resist"	Sepultura
1991	"Sgt. Baker"	Primus
1984	"State of the Nation"	Industry
2002	"Square Dance"	Eminem
1967	"Take it Back"	Cream
1990	"Train"	Uncle Tupelo
1982	"War Party"	Eddy Grant
1980	"When Ya Get Drafted"	Dead Kennedys

== Traditional music ==
Apart from the various genres of modern music, some traditional and contemporary folk songs reflect the futile efforts of war and the attitudes of objectors prior to the major wars of the 20th century. Some of these include:

- "Ain't Gonna Study War No More" also known as "Down by the Riverside", has a similar tune to "Hand Me Down, My Walking Cane," – African-American traditional anti-war song recorded by The Weavers and many others.
- "Arthur McBride" – While first curated in the 19th century, this song likely came into existence during the 17th century in response to the War of the Grand Alliance, or especially the Williamite War in Ireland, after which the Irish Jacobite army was sent to France as agreed in the Treaty of Limerick on October 3, 1691.
- "The Cruel War" – Made famous in its current form by Pete Seeger and Peter Paul and Mary, this anti-war song has roots at least as far back as the American Civil War, and can probably be traced to an older English song.
- "Ich bin Soldat, doch bin ich es nicht gerne" de – German song popular during the Franco-Prussian War, tells of the futility of being a soldier, and ends with a call for reconciliation between nations and the overthrow of tyrants.
- "Johnny I Hardly Knew Ye" – Irish traditional anti-war and anti-recruiting song that was the basis for the song "When Johnny Comes Marching Home", and recorded as "Fighting for Strangers" by Steeleye Span.
- "Join the British Army" – Irish rebel song, recorded by Ewan MacColl and the Dubliners.
- "Kannoneer Jabůrek" is a popular Czech song mocking war heroism, referring to the events of the 1866 Austro-Prussian War
- "Lincoln's Army" - the Irish Rovers
- "Lowlands of Holland" — Martin Carthy
- "Mrs. McGrath" is an Irish song describing a young man named Ted who enters the British Army and returns seven years later having lost his legs to a cannonball while fighting against Napoleon presumably at the Battle of Fuentes de Oñoro (fought between 3 and 5 May 1811). Bruce Springsteen recorded a version of this song on his 2006 album We Shall Overcome: the Seeger Sessions, and it appears on the subsequent live 2007 album Bruce Springsteen with the Sessions Band: Live in Dublin

== Musicals ==
Year	Title	Artist	Theme
1967	Hair	Gerome Ragni, James Rado, and Galt MacDermot	The Vietnam War
1936	Johnny Johnson	Kurt Weill	World War I
1959	The Sound of Music	Rodgers & Hammerstein	World War II
1989	Miss Saigon	Claude-Michel Schönberg	The Vietnam War
1963	Oh, What a Lovely War!	Joan Littlewood	World War I

== See also ==
- Anti-war movement
- Protest songs
- List of anti-war books
- List of anti-war films
- List of anti-war plays
- List of peace activists
- Vietnam War Song Project
