= Hind's Hall 2 =

2024 single by Macklemore featuring Anees, MC Abdul and Amer Zahr

Single by Macklemore featuring Anees, MC Abdul and Amer Zahr
- Released: September 21, 2024
- Recorded: 2024
- Genre: Political hip hop; R&B
- Length: 5:17
- Label: Bendo
- Songwriter: Ben Haggerty
- Producer: Macklemore

Macklemore singles chronology
"Hind's Hall" (2024)	"Hind's Hall 2" (2024)	"Fucked Up" (2025)

Anees singles chronology
"Kiss My Wounds" (2024)	"Hind's Hall 2" (2024)	"Thrive" (2024)

MC Abdul singles chronology
"Deira" (2024)	"Hind's Hall 2" (2024)	"I May Be Young" (2024)

Amer Zahr singles chronology
"Hind's Hall 2" (2024)

Lyric video
- "Hind's Hall 2" on YouTube

"Hind's Hall 2" (stylized in all caps) is a protest song by American rapper Macklemore featuring Anees, MC Abdul and Amer Zahr, released on September 21, 2024, as a sequel to his May 2024 single "Hind's Hall". Like the original, the song expresses solidarity with the Palestinian people amid the Gaza war and takes its title from the renaming of Hamilton Hall at Columbia University to "Hind's Hall" by pro-Palestinian student protesters, in honor of Hind Rajab, a five-year-old Palestinian girl killed by Israeli forces in Gaza City. As with the first song, all proceeds were designated for UNRWA.

== Background and composition ==
"Hind's Hall 2" features guest contributions from Palestinian-American singer Anees, Gaza-born rapper MC Abdul, and Palestinian-American comedian and author Amer Zahr, who sings and plays the oud on the track. The song also includes choir vocals from the LA Palestinian Kids Choir, the Lifted! Youth Gospel Choir, and Tiffany Wilson and Friends.

Rolling Stone described MC Abdul as a Gaza-born rapper, and Dawn's Images and the Palestine Chronicle both specified his age as 15 at the time of the song's release, noting his verse recounts surviving the war and losing family members. Anees, credited across sources as Anees Mokhiber, is described as a Palestinian-American singer who opens the track and delivers its central chorus line. Amer Zahr is identified as a Palestinian-American comedian and author who both sings and plays the oud on the song, leading a bilingual Arabic-and-English rendition of the chorus alongside the featured choirs.

Musically, Dawn's Images described the song as softer and more melodic than the original "Hind's Hall," opening with a sung verse from Anees before Macklemore's rap enters around the three-minute mark, delivered over a beat carried over from the first song. Amer Zahr and the choirs perform a bilingual chorus in English and Arabic built around a message of Palestinian resilience.

In his verse, Macklemore addresses Vice President Kamala Harris, then the Democratic Party's presidential nominee, warning that continued US military support for Israel could cost her the state of Michigan, and references the Uncommitted National Movement, an effort urging voters to withhold support from Harris over the administration's Gaza policy. The song also incorporates the phrase "from the river to the sea, Palestine will be free," which Billboard noted the American Jewish Committee has described as a rallying cry used by pro-Palestinian activists that some view as calling for the elimination of the State of Israel.

Accounts differed on the song's accompanying visuals: Dawn's Images reported that, unlike the original "Hind's Hall," the song was not released with a music video and instead used a photograph of Palestinian children by photojournalist Motaz Azaiza, while the Palestine Chronicle described the release as including a music video incorporating archival and contemporary news footage from Gaza alongside historical footage referencing the Irish Republican Army, Malcolm X, and the Black Panther Party.

== Release ==
The song was released on September 21, 2024, four months after the original "Hind's Hall". XXL described "Hind's Hall 2" as released on September 20, one day ahead of Macklemore's live performance at the Palestine Will Live Forever Festival, an event held in benefit of UNRWA. Macklemore performed "Hind's Hall 2" live for the first time that weekend at the Palestine Will Live Forever Festival at Seward Park Amphitheatre in his hometown of Seattle. During the performance, after the crowd shouted at him, Macklemore led the audience in a chant of "fuck America," and stated that the war constituted "a genocide" that he said had been ongoing "since 1948." XXL's account of the same moment quoted Macklemore telling the crowd, "Straight up, say it, I'm not gonna stop you," before adding, "Um, yeah, fuck America."

== Reception ==
Billboard's Gil Kaufman noted the song's political content and provocative live debut, including Macklemore's remarks at the Seattle show. Dawn's Images outlet described Macklemore's verse as "memorable and powerful," consistent with the reception of the original song. Sammy Baroud, writing for the Palestine Chronicle, called the track a "highly anticipated" follow-up and highlighted its guest performances as an "empowering" display of solidarity.

== Legacy ==
In February 2025, Macklemore released a further protest song, "Fucked Up", which criticized Donald Trump and Elon Musk alongside continued commentary on the Gaza war; The New Arab noted the track as a follow-up to the "Hind's Hall" songs and stated that proceeds from it were also designated for UNRWA.

== Charts ==
Chart performance for "Hind's Hall 2"
Chart (2024)	Peak position
UK Singles Sales (Official Charts)	51
US R&B/Hip-Hop Digital Song Sales (Billboard)	8
