= Hind's Hall =

2024 single by Macklemore

Single by Macklemore
- Released: May 6, 2024
- Recorded: 2024
- Genre: Political hip hop; hardcore hip hop
- Length: 2:48
- Label: Bendo
- Songwriter: Ben Haggerty
- Producer: Macklemore

Macklemore singles chronology
"No Bad Days" (2023)	"Hind's Hall" (2024)	"Hind's Hall 2" (2024)

Music video
- "Hind's Hall" on YouTube

"Hind's Hall" is a protest song written, produced, and performed by American rapper Macklemore. Released as a single on May 6, 2024, it expresses support for the pro-Palestinian protests on university campuses that call for an end to the Gaza genocide, divestment from Israel, and a ceasefire in the Gaza war.

The song's title is a reference to pro-Palestinian activists' renaming of Hamilton Hall at Columbia University to "Hind's Hall" in honor of Hind Rajab, a five-year-old Palestinian girl killed by Israeli forces in the Gaza Strip. In the song, Macklemore is critical of the United States's funding of Israel; he describes Israel's occupation of the Palestinian territories as apartheid. Additionally, Macklemore announces his opposition to the music industry for their silence on the issue, and to President Joe Biden because of his support for the Israeli government and military.

== Background ==
Hind Rajab, a five-year-old Palestinian girl who was killed by the Israeli military, is referenced in the song.

In 2024, pro-Palestinian protests on university campuses took place across the world, particularly in the United States, as protesters called on their universities to sever links with Israeli entities due to Israel's actions in the Gaza war. Protestor encampments were raided by US police, who arrested more than 2,300 students, many of whom face expulsion and campus bans.

Protests at Columbia University have been prominent. At Columbia, activists occupied Hamilton Hall and renamed the building as "Hind's Hall" in honor of Hind Rajab, a five-year-old Palestinian girl who was killed by Israeli forces in Gaza City along with her relatives and paramedics who came to her rescue. On April 30, 2024, New York police sieged Hamilton Hall and arrested the protesters inside.

== Composition ==
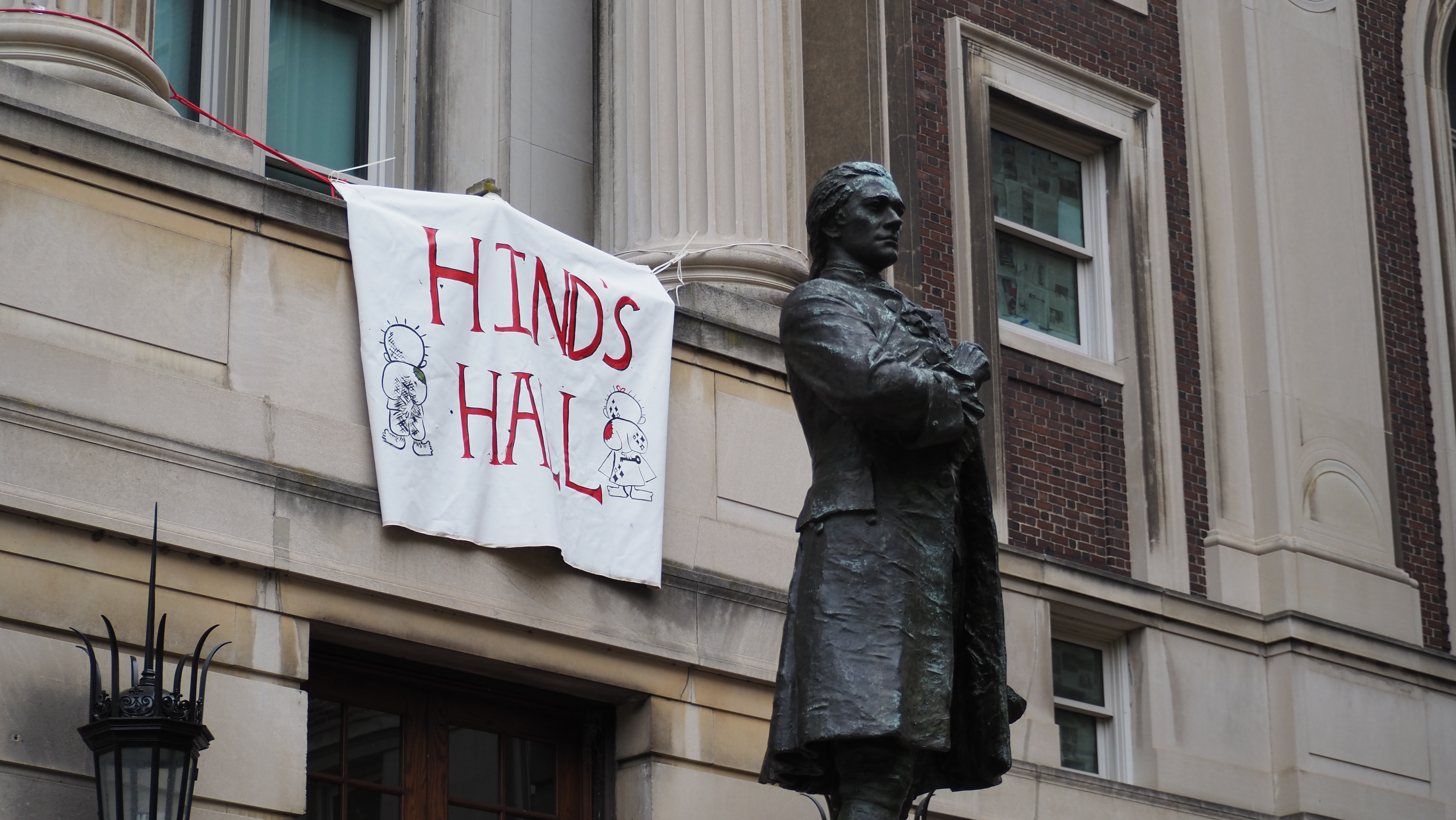
A banner hangs after protesters occupied Hamilton Hall, renaming it "Hind's Hall" for Hind Rajab. William Ordway Partridge's 1908 statue of Alexander Hamilton is in the foreground.

"Hind's Hall" was composed and produced by Macklemore, and samples "Ana La Habibi" by Lebanese singer Fairuz. In his lyrics, Macklemore is critical of the United States' funding of Israel and describes Israel's occupation of the Palestinian territories as apartheid. He also criticizes US politicians' acceptance of donations from pro-Israel lobbying organizations such as Christians United for Israel (CUFI) and the American Israel Public Affairs Committee (AIPAC). Macklemore characterizes Israel's military operations during the war as "a genocide", and makes references to the Nakba and the Israeli military's killing of Palestinian children in the Gaza Strip.

Macklemore calls for a ceasefire in the Gaza war. He condemns the music industry's "platform of silence" on the war. He also references the ongoing feud between rappers Drake and Kendrick Lamar, saying he considers it a minor issue compared to the war. Additionally, Macklemore declared President Joe Biden as complicit in the Israeli government's mass murder of Palestinian civilians, saying "The blood is on your hands, Biden". Macklemore also proclaimed in May 2024 that he would not vote for Biden in the 2024 United States presidential election, and that he was undecided.

The song also denounces Congress' banning of TikTok, the white supremacy apparent in policing and policy decisions, and the conflation of antisemitism with anti-Zionism. Macklemore quotes the title of the 1988 song "Fuck tha Police" by hip hop group N.W.A.

== Release ==
The single was released on social media on May 6, 2024. Macklemore announced that once the song was available on streaming services, all of the single's proceeds would be donated to UNRWA. Macklemore performed the song live for the first time on May 9, 2024 in New Zealand, saying, "I stand here today and every day forward for the rest of my life in solidarity with the people of Palestine, with an open heart, in the belief that our collective liberation is at stake – that we all deserve freedom in this life of ours". On May 11, the song was made available on major streaming platforms including Spotify, Apple Music, and Amazon Music.

The song's music video includes a photo of a college building spray-painted with the phrase "Free Palastine [sic]". Some internet users erroneously believed the photo was taken at Columbia University and used it to criticize the protesters. The photo was taken of Tabaret Hall at the University of Ottawa in Canada.

=== Hind's Hall 2 ===
On September 21, 2024, Macklemore released a new version of the song titled "Hind's Hall 2", featuring Palestinian and Palestinian American artists Anees, MC Abdul, Amer Zahr, the LA Palestinian Kids Choir, the Lifted! Youth Gospel Choir, and Tiffany Wilson. In the song, he endorsed the Uncommitted National Movement, warning presidential candidate Kamala Harris that she would lose the state of Michigan in the 2024 United States presidential election unless she supported an arms embargo on Israel. All proceeds from this version would be donated to UNRWA.

He performed the song at the Palestine Will Live Forever Festival in Seward Park Amphitheatre in Seattle on September 21, 2024.

== Reception ==
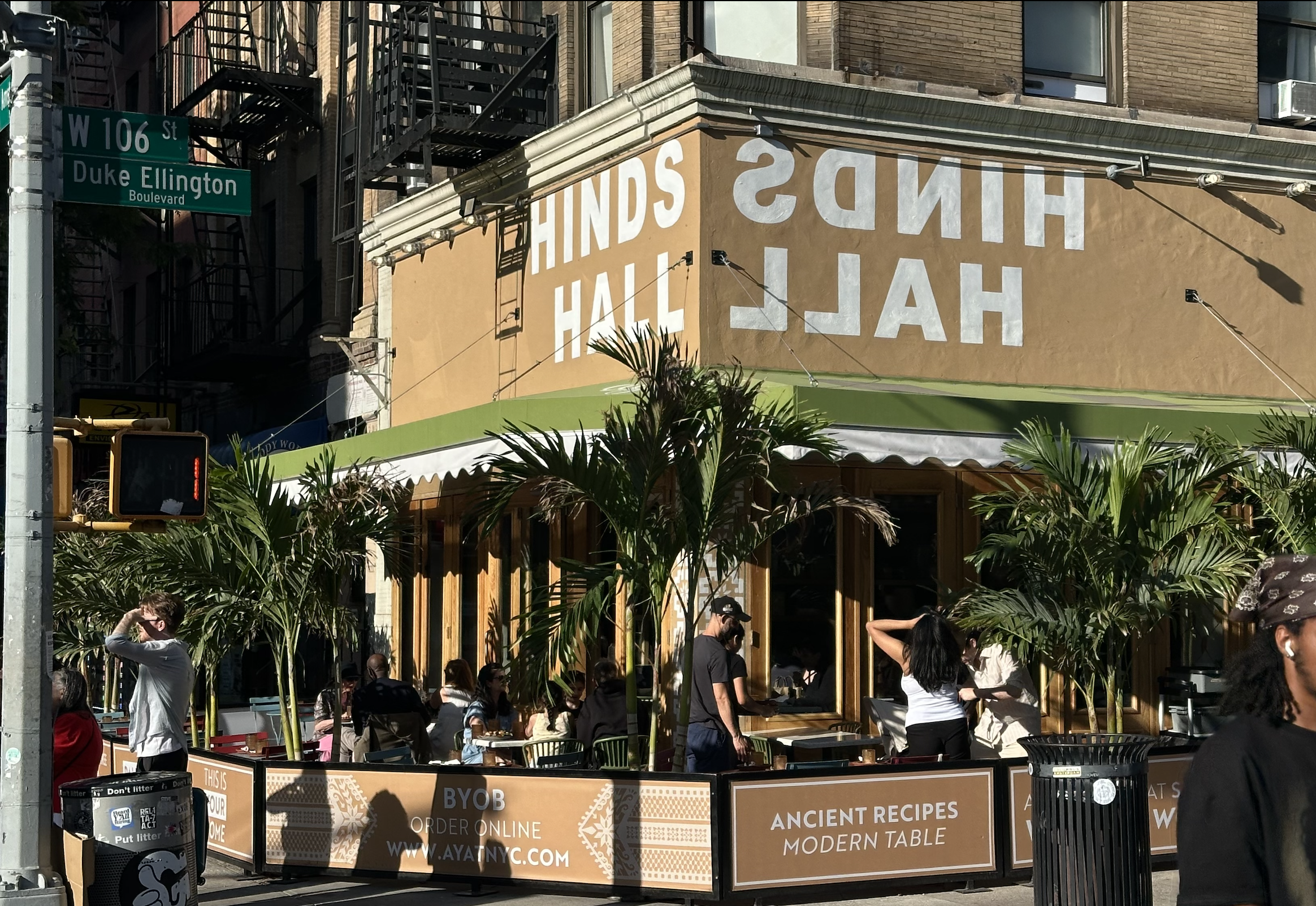
In 2026, a Palestinian restaurant named Hinds Hall opened on the Upper West Side.

Solcyre Burga in Time called it "the latest addition to the catalog of American protest songs that includes Billie Holiday's "Strange Fruit" and Crosby, Stills, and Nash & Young's [sic] "Ohio." Guitarist Tom Morello of Rage Against the Machine tweeted: "Honestly @macklemore’s 'Hind’s Hall' is the most Rage Against The Machine song since Rage Against The Machine." Jill Stein, the Green Party's presidential candidate in 2024, publicly thanked Macklemore for making the song. Reception from social media has been positive, with many users praising Macklemore's use of his platform to protest. Aja Romano of Vox called the song "electrifying" due to its surprise release; they noted that Macklemore's position as a white independent artist has helped him to express himself freely without career-ending consequences, especially considering the song's contentious subject matter.

On 15 September 2026, "Hind's Hall" reached number ten on the iTunes Top Songs chart following Mackelmore's controversial removal from Ed Sheeran's Loop Tour.

== Charts ==
Chart performance for "Hind's Hall"
Chart (2024)	Peak position
Australia (ARIA)	85
Australia Hip Hop/R&B (ARIA)	18
Canada Hot 100 (Billboard)	61
France (SNEP)	125
Global 200 (Billboard)	184
Greece International (IFPI)	67
Ireland (IRMA)	19
Netherlands (Single Tip)	12
New Zealand (Recorded Music NZ)	33
Switzerland (Schweizer Hitparade)	61
UK Singles (Official Charts)	51
UK Hip Hop/R&B (Official Charts)	13
UK Independent (Official Charts)	8
US Digital Song Sales (Billboard)	7
US R&B/Hip-Hop Digital Song Sales (Billboard)	3

== Release history ==
Release history for "Hind's Hall"
Region	Date	Format(s)	Label	Ref.
Various	May 6, 2024	Social media	—N/a	
Various	May 10, 2024	Digital download; streaming	Bendo	

== See also ==
- List of anti-war songs
- "FDT", anti–Donald Trump protest song with remix featuring Macklemore
- "Fucked Up", a 2025 song by Macklemore, talking more on the Gaza War, criticizing Donald Trump and Elon Musk
- Blockout 2024
