= VIA Kaskad =

Soviet VIA band (1983–Present)

VIA Kaskad ВИА Каскад
- Origin: Bagram, Democratic Republic of Afghanistan
- Genres: Pop music, rock music, military realism
- Years active: 1983-Present
- Labels: Melodiya; KDK Records

VIA Kaskad (Russian: ВИА Каскад) is Soviet VIA band from the Soviet-Afghan War, formed in 1983. They regularly toured Soviet military bases during the war, and had over 400 concerts. The group's music has been described as “military-patriotic”.

== History ==
The band was first formed in late 1983 from the band VIA Tankist (ВИА Танкист), which had been formed in 1981. Tankist was formed out of the orchestra of the 177th Motor Rifle Regiment. They made the first recording of songs written by soldiers of the KGB Group "Cascade", namely Igor Morozov and Yuri Kirsanov.

Kaskad was formed in a garrison house in Bagram, a town in the Democratic Republic of Afghanistan, in 1983. Its key founder was Andrei Sukhov, a Soviet officer and military conductor. He had been ordered to organize an ensemble for a concert for Victory Day on 9 May 1983. He organized several musicians and other performers together and performed a well-received three-hour long concert. They were then sent to perform concerts in distant outposts around Afghanistan. This resulted in Sukhov cutting the amount of members from fifteen to just four.

Kaskad's name came from the KGB detachment. The ensemble did not originally have a name, but the audiences of their concerts named them Kaskad for the KGB detachment from which their songs came from. These songs were discovered in the summer of 1983, as they began to become a traveling ensemble, when they heard the tapes. Most were written by Morozov and Kirsanov; their names were not known, as someone had merely written the word "Kaskad" on the tape. The band arrived in Khenjan to perform and were greeted by posters welcoming the Kaskad band. The members of Sukhov's ensemble asked what ensemble was also there, only to be told: "So it's you!"

Alongside preexisting songs from Cascade, the ensemble drew on the words of soldiers' poems. Sukhov would take these and arrange them for different instruments and also clean up the words. Initially, Soviet officials did not like the “freedom of expression” the group used to sing about the Soviet-Afghan War. They were forced to perform their songs “underground”. These would be in remote military bases, and the songs could not be performed in cities like Kabul. Their songs were recorded on cassettes and became immensely popular amongst soldiers. However, they were forbidden to be sent across the border, as Kaskad's songs were listed at the border alongside banned items like weapons, ammunition, and drugs. Sukhov discovered a method to unwind tapes, wrap it in a postcard, cover it in paper, put it in an envelope, and send it off. In the envelope was instructions on how to rewind the tape. Hundreds then began taking Kaskad's songs across the border into the Soviet Union. In 1985, the group was finally greenlit.

Major Alexander Kolesnikov took over for Sukhov as the group's artistic director in 1985. He helped get their first official album, titled “Let's Remember, Guys!” (Вспомним, ребята!) get released by Melodiya. The band's second lineup was the largest, with a saxophonist, trombonist, and keyboard player, among other instruments. The band's third lineup was formed in 1988 after another rotation, and it was now led by Alexander Khalilov. Their next album, "Let Memory Speak" (Пусть память говорит), was released in 1989. Due to ideological obstacles, there were songs included that were not very popular. Songs that were not included in the album were "We're Leaving" and "Allah Akhbar", with only demo tracks being recorded.

The group seemed like it would end after the withdraw of Soviet troops from Afghanistan. However, the band was revived by one Ivan Khokhlov. By May 1989, the fourth lineup of Kaskad had been formed. The band recorded on Uzbek Central Television and Radio Mayak. They released a third album in 1991, titled “Southern Cross” (Южный Крест), together with the band Kontingent. The group split up shortly after.

Offshoots of Kaskad with the same name were formed in the cities of Mogilev, Belarus; Alma-Ata, Kazakhstan; Termez, Uzbekistan, and Yaroslavl, Russia. The two naming exceptions were a group from Ukraine, named Memory, and the Yaroslavl group that was known as "Andrey Sukhov's ensemble". All of these groups performed the same Afghan songs all over the countries of the CIS.

In late 2011, Sukhov was invited to perform several songs for a concert. Sukhov called several former members of Kaskad and then played multiple songs, lasting about five hours. In 2012, Andrei Sukhov was invited to sing three songs at a concert in Crocus City. It was to celebrate the 70th anniversary of the 108th Division stationed in Bagram, which Kaskad had formed out of. Sukhov met with the men he had been with at the last concert and did three songs. Sukhov then named the group Veterans of the Group Kaskad. They later released multiple albums.

Andrey Sukhov died in 2022. Veterans of the Group Kaskad still continues tours of the former Soviet Union. They are based in Moscow.

== Albums ==
=== Illegal, as Kaskad ===
- Афганская кассета No. 1 (Afghan Cassette No. 1) - 1983
- Запись с концерта в Афганистане (Recordings from Concerts in Afghanistan) - 1983

=== Legal, as Kaskad ===
- Вспомним, Ребята... (Let's Remember, Guys...) - 1987
- Пусть Память Говорит (Let Memory Speak) - 1989
- Южный Крест (Southern Cross) - 1991

=== As Sukhov's Kaskad ===
- Виват, Шурави (Live on, Shuravi) - 1991
- Вспомним ребята! (Let's Remember, Guys!) - 2004
- Кукушка (Cuckoo) - 2004
- Лучшие песни (Best Songs) - 2007

=== As Veterans of the Kaskad Group ===
- Мы выходим (We're Leaving) - 2012
- 30 лет спустя (30 Years Later) - 2013
- Шагнувшие в пламя (Stepped Into the Flame) - 2016
- Концерт в Баграме (Live) (Concert in Bagram (Live)) - 2020, recorded 1988
- Tак почему сегодня нам не спеть (So Why Shouldn't We Sing Today) - 2021
- Афган: Лучшие песни (Afghanistan: The Best Songs) - 2022
