= Stop the War in Croatia =

Single by Tomislav Ivčić

from the album Stop the War in Croatia
- Written: Tomislav Ivčić
- Released: 12 August 1991
- Recorded: 31 July 1991
- Studio: Croatia Records
- Genre: Anti-war, pop, country
- Length: 3:20
- Songwriter: Tomislav Ivčić

"Stop the War in Croatia" is a Croatian anti-war and peace song from 1991. It was written by the Croatian pop singer, songwriter and politician Tomislav Ivčić. For several weeks in 1991, the song was listed among Billboard's 100 most popular records.

Croatian Radiotelevision broadcast the song for first time on 12 August 1991, and the following day it was played by the BBC, CNN and 44 other broadcasters. Hundreds of news reports and cover pages followed. "Stop the War in Croatia" received global air-time. In Australia, the song got to the top of the 10 most listened to songs.

"Stop the War in Croatia" caught the eye of many celebrities including Phil Collins, who asked people "to give as much as they could to help the children in Croatia". According to Croatian Radiotelevision, the song helped promote the cause of Croatian independence on the global stage, leading to its international recognition.

== Chart ==
Chart (1991)	Peak position
Australia (ARIA)	7
