= Kaskad (KGB unit) =

KGB unit

- Каскад
- Active: 1980-1983
- Country: Soviet Union
- Branch: KGB
- Type: Special forces
- Size: ~1000-1600
- Engagements: Soviet-Afghan war

"Kaskad" was a reconnaissance squad of KGB, created on 18 July 1980 for participation in the Soviet-Afghan war.

== History ==
Kaskad was formed by the Resolution of the Central Committee of the CPSU and the Council of Ministers of the USSR No. 615-200 of July 18, 1980. The core of the detachment consisted of fighters from the Krasnodar and Alma-Ata regiments and the Tashkent battalion of the OBrON, as well as former fighters of the OSN Zenit and special reservists of the KGB of the USSR from among the graduates of the KUOS. The detachment's tasks and functions were defined by Order No. 00100 of the Chairman of the KGB of the USSR dated July 22, 1980, and included:

- Assistance to Afghans in establishing local security agencies;
- Organization of undercover operations against existing gangs;
- Organization and implementation of special operations against the most aggressive opponents of the existing Afghan people's regime and the USSR.

In total, the Kaskad detachment consisted of approximately 1,000 personnel. Structurally, the detachment consisted of a command post, headquarters, and eight special combat groups: Ural (based in Kabul), Kavkaz (based in Kandahar), Karpaty (based in Herat), Karpaty-1 (based in Shindand), Tibet (based in Jalalabad), Sever-1 (based in Mazar-i-Sharif), Sever-2 (based in Kunduz), and Altai (based in Ghazni).

In total, five Kaskad special forces units operated in Afghanistan from July 1980 to April 1984: Kaskad-1 (6 months), Kaskad-2 (6 months), Kaskad-3 (9 months), Kaskad-4 (1 year), and the Omega detachment (1 year). The commander of the first three units was Major General A. I. Lazarenko, and Cascade-4 was headed by Colonel E. A. Savintsev; all of them were employees of the KGB's foreign intelligence division. During its operations in Afghanistan, the detachment lost 6 officers killed. In the autumn of 1980, the "Kobalt" special operations unit of the USSR Ministry of Internal Affairs was transferred to the command of the Kaskad detachment. The "Kobalt" detachment consisted of 600 personnel—officers of the USSR Ministry of Internal Affairs. In 1983, the "Cascade" detachment was replaced by the "Omega" detachment, led by Colonel V. I. Kikot.

== Leadership ==
=== Commanders ===
- Lazarenko, Alexander Ivanovich (1980-1982)
- Savintsev, Evgeny Alexandrovich (1982-1983)

=== Chiefs of Staff ===
- Polyakov Alexey Konstantinovich (1980-1981)
- Bogdanovich Vladimir Vladimirovich (1981)
- Sopryakov Vadim Nikolaevich (1981-1982)
- Kim Viktor Nikolaevich (1982-1983)
