= Hamilton Hall (Columbia University) =

Academic building in Manhattan, New York

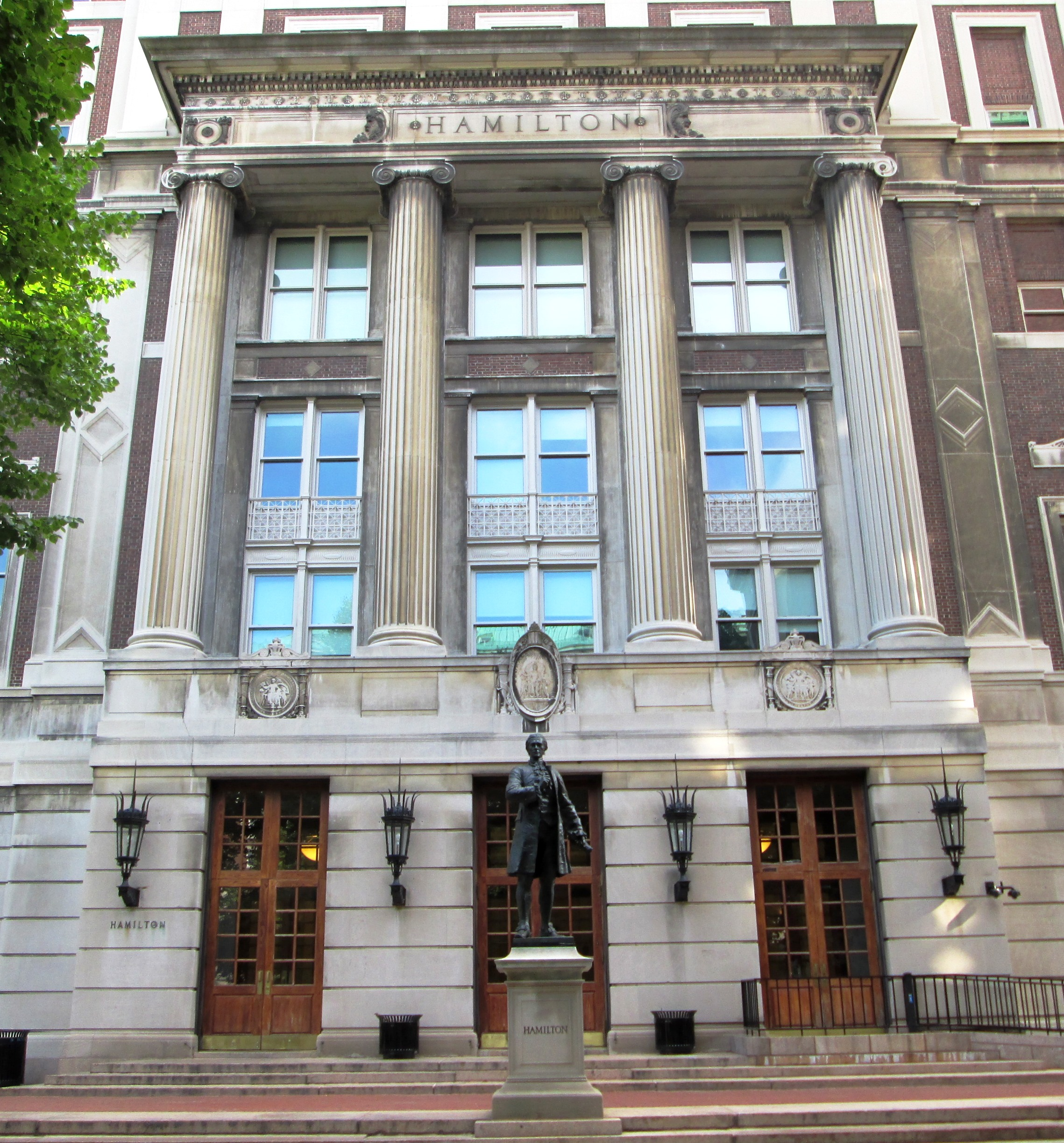
- The facade of Hamilton Hall at the entrance, with the statue of Alexander Hamilton prominent in front of the building

General information
- Architectural style: Neoclassical
- Coordinates: 40°48′24.66″N 73°57′42.14″W
- Current tenants: Columbia College
- Year built: 1905–1907
- Owner: Columbia University

Design and construction
- Architect: McKim, Mead & White

Hamilton Hall is an academic building on the Morningside Heights campus of Columbia University on College Walk (West 116th Street) at 1130 Amsterdam Avenue in Manhattan, New York City, serving as the home of Columbia College. It was built in 1905–1907 and was designed by McKim, Mead & White in the Neoclassical style; the building was part of the firm's original master plan for the campus. The building was the gift of the John Stewart Kennedy, a former trustee of Columbia College, and is named after Alexander Hamilton, who attended King's College, Columbia's original name. A statue of Hamilton by William Ordway Partridge stands outside the building entrance. Hamilton Hall is the location of the Columbia College administrative offices.

Hamilton Hall has been occupied at several times by student protest movements at Columbia: it was occupied and renamed Malcolm X Liberation College in honor of Malcolm X in 1968; Mandela Hall for Nelson Mandela in 1985; and Hind's Hall for Hind Rajab in 2024.

== History ==
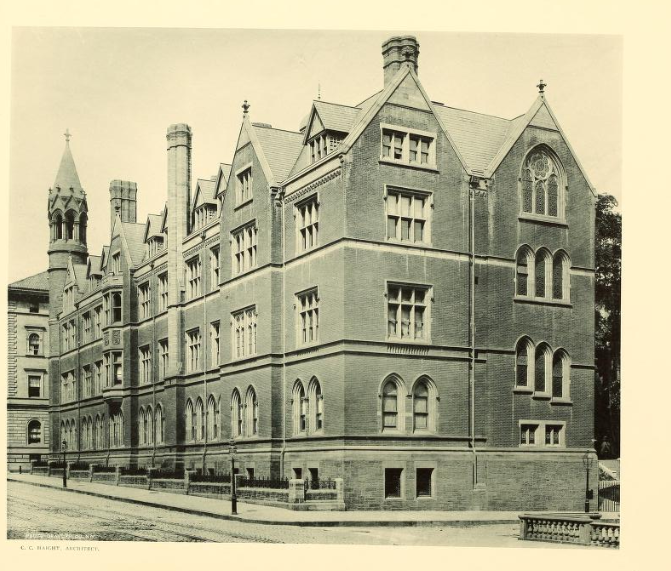
The original Hamilton Hall at 49th Street and Madison Avenue, in 1886

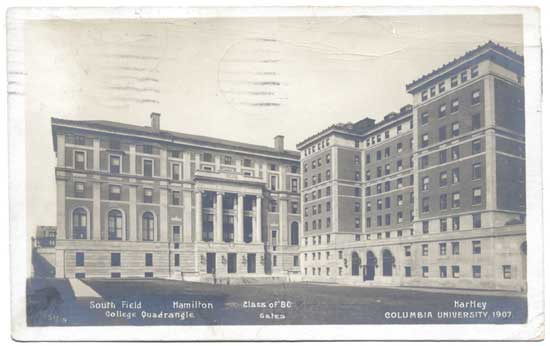
Hamilton Hall (left), new home of Columbia College, and Hartley Hall, the college's first dormitory, in 1907

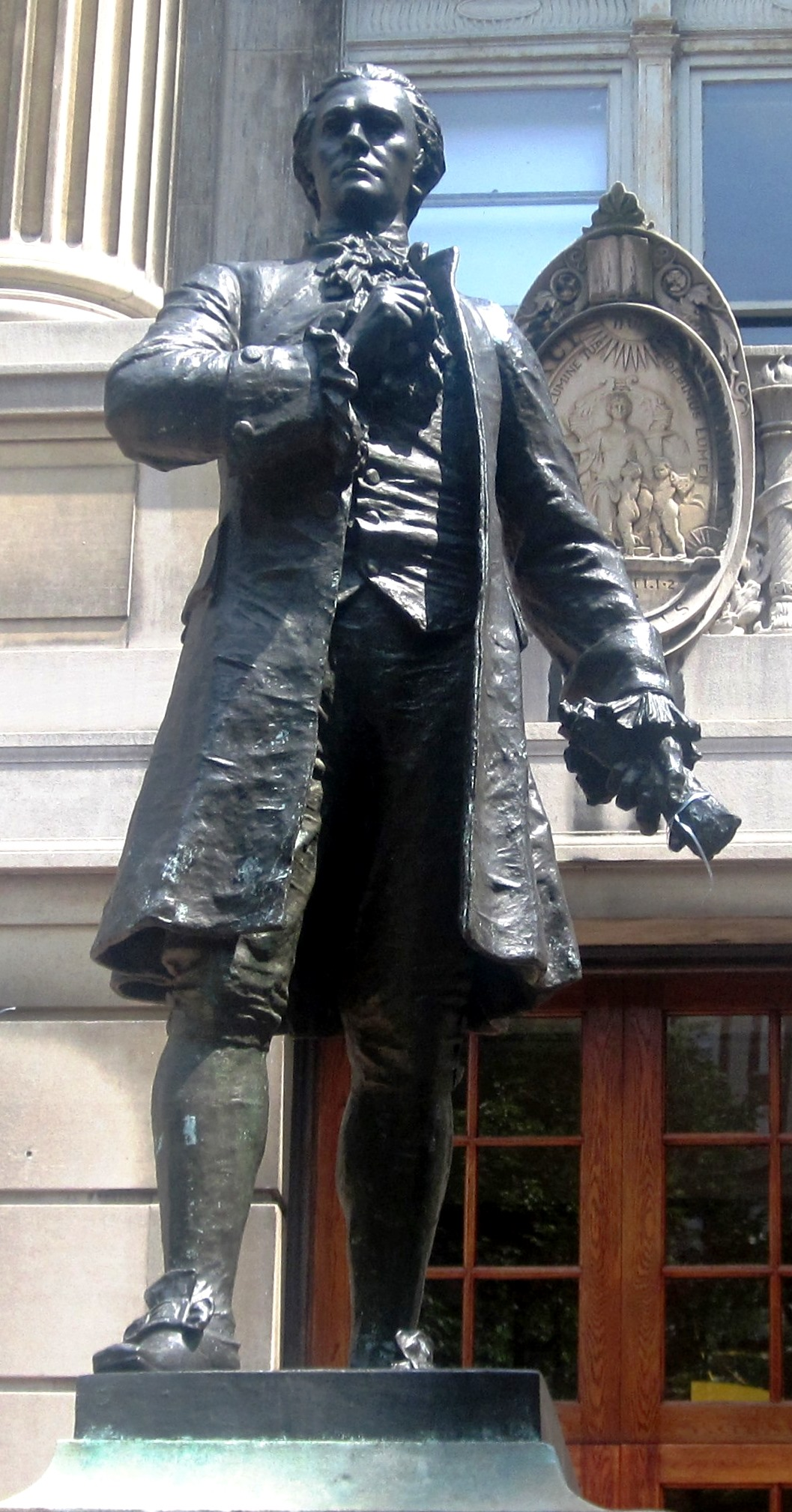
William Ordway Partridge's statue of Alexander Hamilton (1908)

The original Hamilton Hall was built in 1878 in the Gothic Revival style and located on Madison Avenue between 49th and 50th streets on the college's former Midtown campus, directly across 50th Street from the Villard Houses. It was five stories tall and had an elaborate turret at its northwest corner. The property of Columbia's former Midtown campus was sold in 1898. The Berkeley School relocated from West 44th Street to occupy the southern half of Hamilton Hall, where it remained until 1902 when the property was sold and the school relocated to a new site on the Upper West Side.

When Columbia became a university and relocated to Morningside Heights in the 1890s, there were originally no plans for the area south of 116th Street, where Hamilton Hall now sits, or for any facilities dedicated to the undergraduate college. Nevertheless, college advocates persevered and the cornerstone for the new Hamilton Hall was laid in 1905. The building was designed by the firm of McKim, Mead, and White in the neoclassical style, in conformity with most of the other buildings on the Morningside campus. It was completed in 1907.

In 2002, a renovation of Hamilton Hall was completed. Two stained glass windows depicting Sophocles and Virgil, gifts from the class of 1885 and 1891 respectively, were installed in the Hamilton Hall lobby in 2003, having sat in storage for nearly 60 years. The building houses many of the classes of Columbia College's Core Curriculum.

== Protests ==
=== Malcolm X Liberation College: 1968 protest during the Vietnam War and Black freedom movement ===
Starting in the latter half of the 20th century, Hamilton Hall was taken over several times in the course of student activism at Columbia University, first during the protests of April 1968. In the course of this protest, a multiracial group first barricaded themselves inside the building, imprisoning acting dean Henry S. Coleman in his office. The black students renamed the building "Malcolm X Liberation College" and eventually asked the white students to leave, prompting the latter's takeover of several other university buildings. After the violent end to the April activities, Hamilton was the most peacefully cleared hall but was briefly reoccupied in May 1968.

=== Mandela Hall: 1985 protest to divest from Apartheid South Africa ===
The building was then the site of a major 1985 student strike and barricade to demand university divestment from South Africa, which was under the apartheid system at the time, as well as ethnic studies classes at the university. During the 1985 strike, the building was renamed "Mandela Hall" by the occupying students.

=== Hind's Hall: 2024 protest to divest from Israel ===
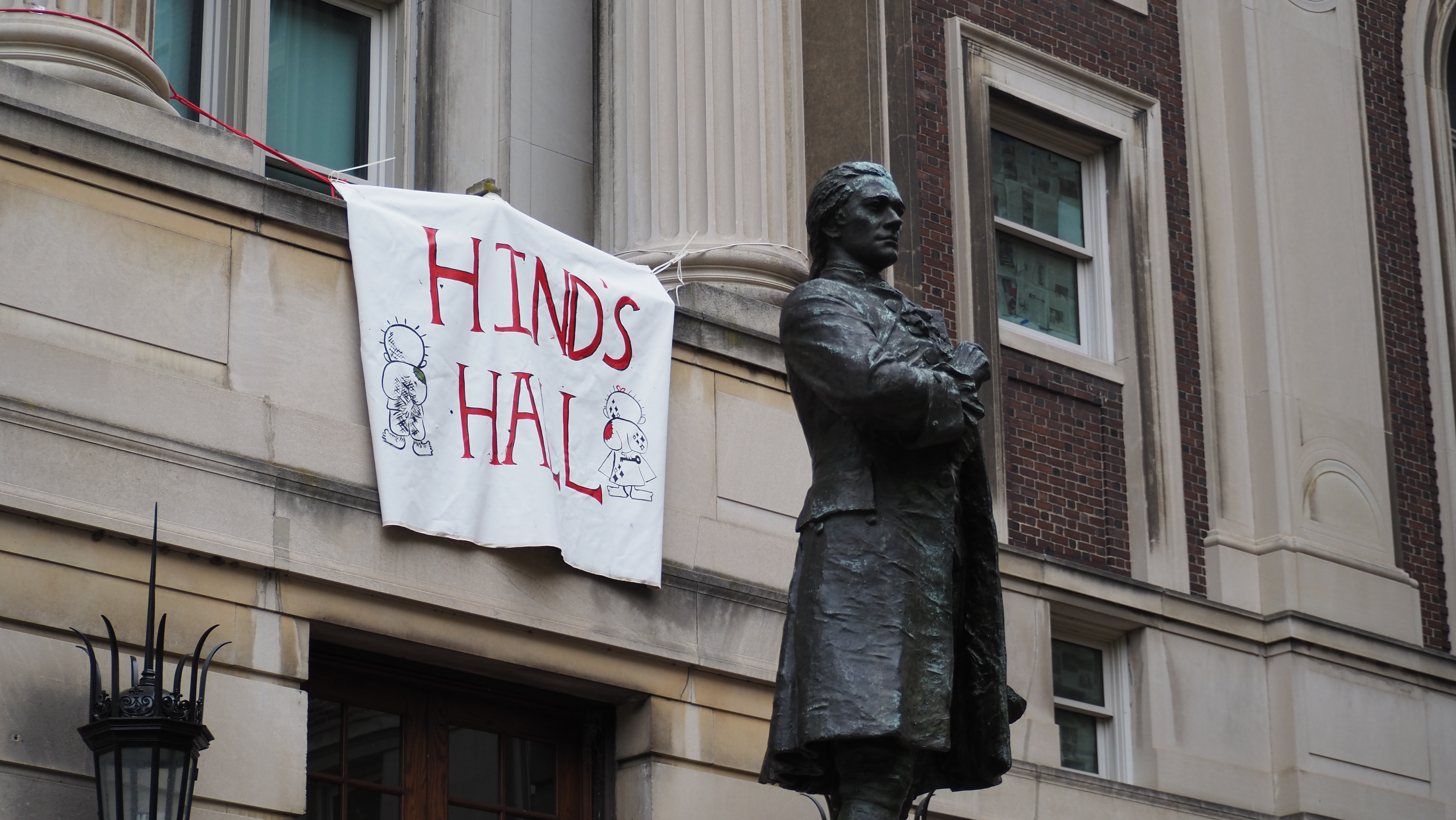
A banner hangs after protesters occupied the building, renaming it "Hind's Hall" for Hind Rajab. William Ordway Partridge's 1908 statue of Alexander Hamilton is in the foreground.

In the early hours of April 30, 2024, the hall was occupied by a group of students, staff, alumni, and others who had been participating in the Gaza Solidarity Encampment (April 17–30, 2024), a protest encampment calling on Columbia to divest from Israel during the war and genocide in Gaza. During the occupation of Hamilton Hall, protesters unfurled a large banner and renamed the building "Hind's Hall" in reference to Hind Rajab, a five-year-old Palestinian girl killed by the Israel Defense Forces. The hall was forcibly cleared by the New York Police Department that evening.

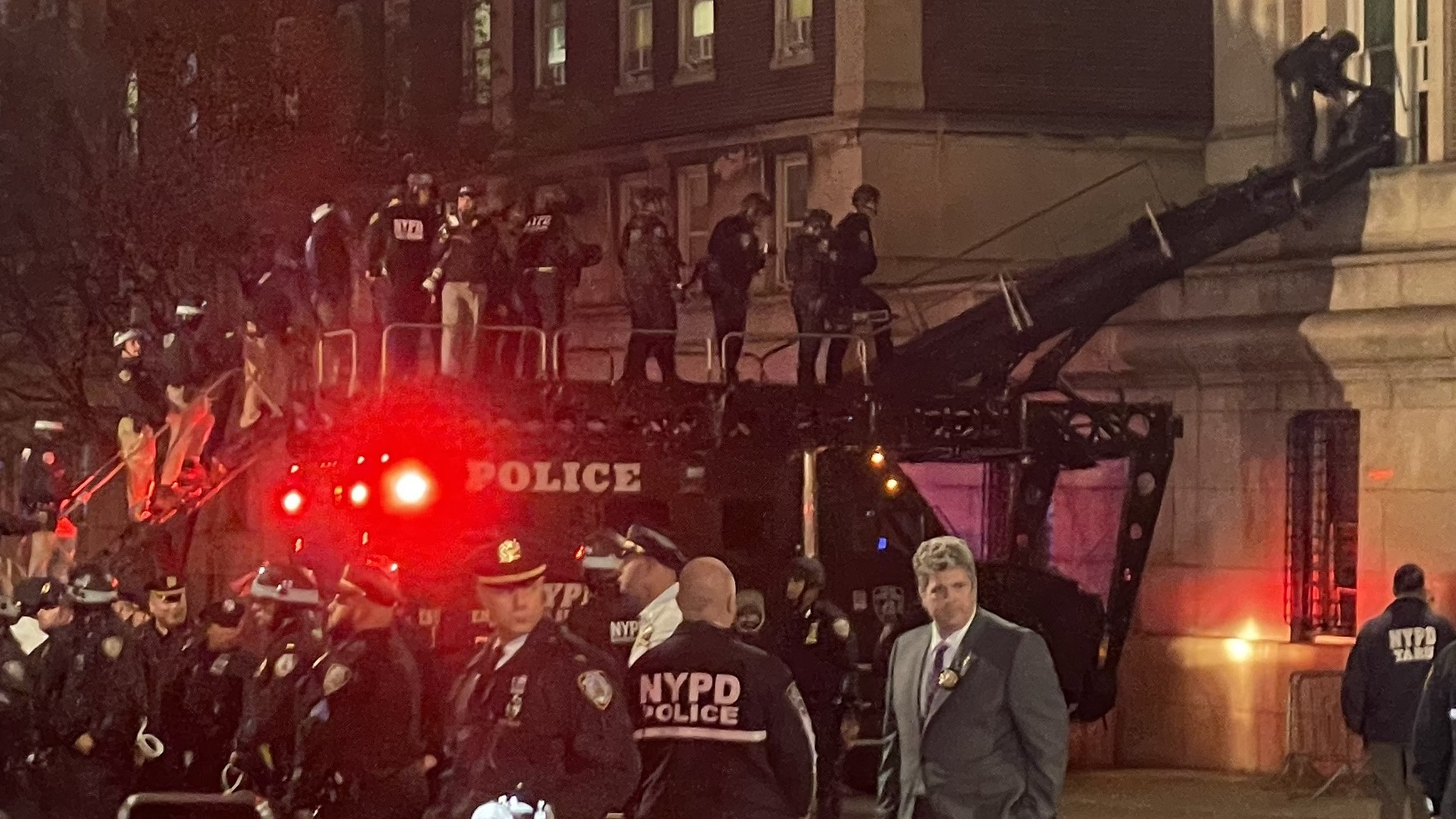
NYPD using a Lenco Bearcat vehicle to break into the university hall to clear it of protesters, April 30, 2024.

According to the Columbia University Senate's 2025 Sundial Report, over 600 NYPD officers were deployed to Columbia University on April 30. Officers of the NYPD's Strategic Response Group (SRG) were used again in April 30 sweep, as they had been in the first sweep of the Gaza Solidarity Encampment on April 18. The administration told students to shelter in place due to "heightened activity". The NYPD prepared to raid the campus after a letter from Shafik gave it permission. Protesters appeared undeterred, continuing chants. At around 9 pm, with administration approval, hundreds of NYPD officers entered campus. The administration blamed protesters for escalating by taking Hamilton Hall. According to Shafik's letter to the NYPD Deputy Commissioner of Legal Matters requesting police intervention, someone hid in the building until it closed, then let others in. Columbia believed that while students were among those who entered, their leaders were unaffiliated with the university. Police used flash-bang grenades to breach the building and arrested more than 100 protesters. Officers were seen entering the building with weapons drawn, and a shot was fired inside the building. The district attorney's office said no one was injured and their Police Accountability Unit was reviewing the incident. By the end of the night, Hamilton Hall and the entire campus were cleared, including the encampment.

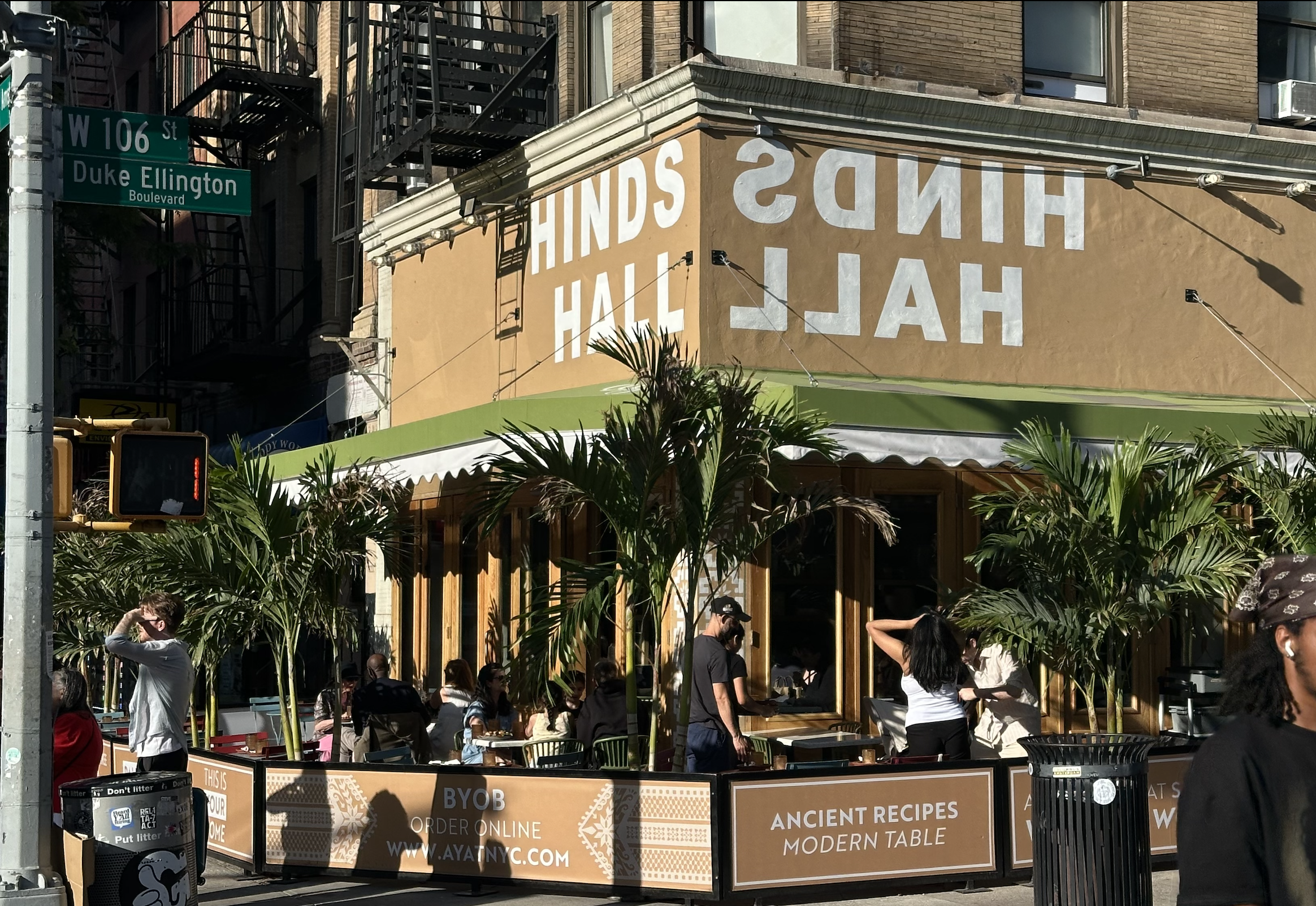
A Palestinian restaurant on the Upper West Side named Hinds Hall, in reference to Hind Rajab and the 2024 occupation of Hamilton Hall.

The Washington Post reported that billionaires and titans of business in a WhatsApp group with Mayor Eric Adams encouraged him to send police to sweep the Columbia protests. The Post reported that a group including Daniel Lubetzky, Daniel S. Loeb, Len Blavatnik, and Joseph Sitt joined a Zoom call with Adams on April 26, a week after he first sent the NYPD onto Columbia's campus to arrest students, and some spoke of making political donations to Adams. Ways members of the WhatsApp group could pressure Columbia's trustees and administration to summon the police on the protesters were also discussed.

American musician Macklemore released an anti-war protest song, "Hind's Hall," in reference to the slain child and the occupation of the hall.
