= We're Leaving =

Song by VIA Kaskad
- Language: Russian
- Released: 1988
- Genre: Russian chanson
- Composer: Alexander Khalilov
- Lyricist: Igor Morozov

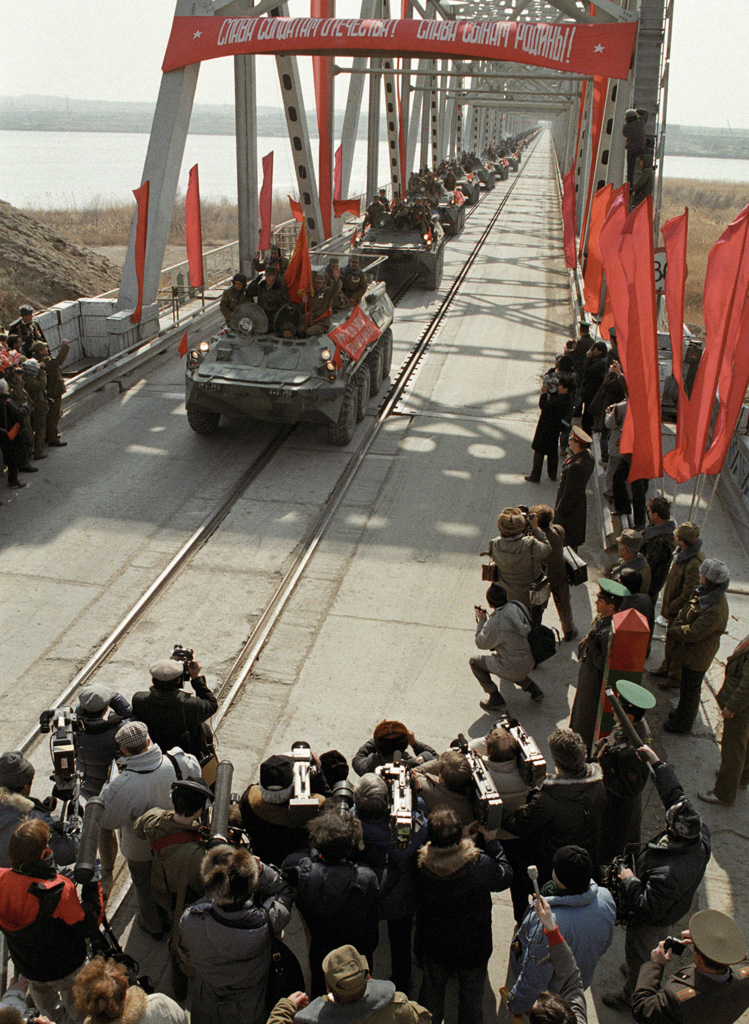
The last Soviet troops leaving Afghanistan, 15 February 1989

"We're Leaving" (Russian: Мы Уходим), alternatively known as "Farewell to the Mountains" (Russian: Прощайте, горы), is a 1988 song based off a poem by the Soviet officer Igor Morozov, with music by Alexander Khalilov. It references the Soviet withdrawal from Afghanistan, and is the best-known song performed by VIA Kaskad; they received first place in the 1988 When Soldiers Sing competition for it. The song has been described as the anthem of Soviet soldiers who fought in the war.

== Creation ==
The Soviets had been fighting in the Soviet–Afghan War for nine years, "with little to show for their bloody struggle". Officer Igor Morozov wrote a poem titled "We're Leaving" in May 1988. On 4 September 1988, Alexander Khalilov, the leader of Kaskad, sat down to sort out papers. He found the poem by Morozov in the stack and it got stuck in his head. He then went and wrote the music for the song.

== Song ==
"We're Leaving" is divided into five stanzas and six refrains. The content of each chorus is different, though all begin with "farewell, mountains, you witnessed" (Прощайте, горы, вам видней).

=== Content ===
The first stanza of the song begins by describing the landscape of Afghanistan by the end of the war. The first refrain criticizes "desk-scholars" (Нас кабинетный грамотей), and tells them not to judge what they don't understand. The second stanza says that "it is not right to remember kindly of you [Afghanistan]" (Не пристало добром вспоминать тебя вроде), and remembers it as an "illusory world" (этот призрач-ный). The second refrain raises the question of how Afghanistan will atone for the tears of mothers of sons killed in the war.

The third stanza wonders how many people were killed by this uncompleted mission. The third refrain states that the enemy won the war. The fourth stanza mentions three rations of alcohol, as that's "that's how many of us survived in the dashing reconnaissance platoon" (Столько нас уцелело в лихом развевзводе). A third toast is also traditionally raised to the dead. The fourth refrain says that the Soviet soldiers lived amongst the people and gave what they had. The fifth and final stanza states that sociologists could "squeeze [soldier's] biographies in half a dozen lines" (Социологи втиснут, сейчас они в моде), but then asks if the sociologists would be able to handle Afghanistan.

It is followed by two refrains, the first of which is a repeat of the first refrain that criticizes desk-scholars" (Нас кабинетный грамотей), and the second of which repeats the third refrain. The song concludes with the phrase "we are leaving the East" (Мы уходим с Востока) twice, and then "leaving" (Уходим).

== Usage ==
The song was played constantly during the end of the Soviet-Afghan War. The song was allegedly played each morning by the 345th Independent Guards Parachute Assault Regiment, which was guarding Salang Pass during the Soviet withdraw.

The song is also associated with the Chechen Wars.

== Reception ==
Kaskad performed the song at the When Soldiers Sing contest hosted for the 70th anniversary of the October Revolution and founding of the Soviet Armed Forces. "We're Leaving" received a record high number of votes (1,792), and Kaskad was awarded a special prize by the East German Ministry of National Defence.

The song was described as a symbolic epitaph to the soldiers who fought in the Soviet-Afghan War. "It was a song of departure with no closure."
