= MC Abdul =

Palestinian rapper

- MC Abdul performing at The Internet for Palestine concert in Los Angeles in 2026

Background information
- Also known as: MCA Abdul
- Born: Abdel Rahman Al-Shantti; 2008 or 2009 (age 17–18); Gaza, Palestine
- Genre: Hip-hop
- Instrument: Vocal
- Years active: 2020–present
- Website: Youtube channel

Abdel-Rahman Al-Shantti (Arabic: عبد الرحمن الشنطي; born September 14, 2008) known professionally as MC Abdul or MCA Abdul is a Palestinian rapper from Gaza, Palestine. He gained popularity when he sang a rap about freedom in front of his school in Gaza which garnered hundreds of thousands of views on social media. As of July 2025, his videos for "Shouting At The Wall" and "Palestine" have received more than 3 million views and 1.8 million views, respectively, on YouTube.

== Early life ==
Abdel-Rahman Al-Shantti was born in Gaza, Palestine. His mother had surgery to treat CNV bleeding in Egypt around 2007, but Al-Shantti said his mother was not able to maintain the surgery due to the blockade of Gaza by Israel. He started rapping and writing songs at age nine. He began recording cover versions of his favorite tracks and sharing them with friends and online. His family exposed him to artists such as Eminem and fellow Palestinian DJ Khaled, the former of which Abdul considers to be one of his four favourites; the others are NF, Tupac and Jay-Z. He said he would like to go on Arab Idol like fellow Palestinian Mohammed Assaf.

At the start of the 2023 genocide in Gaza, Al-Shantti is living in Los Angeles, although his family, including his younger siblings, are still living in Gaza. 81 of his family members were killed during the war.

== Career ==
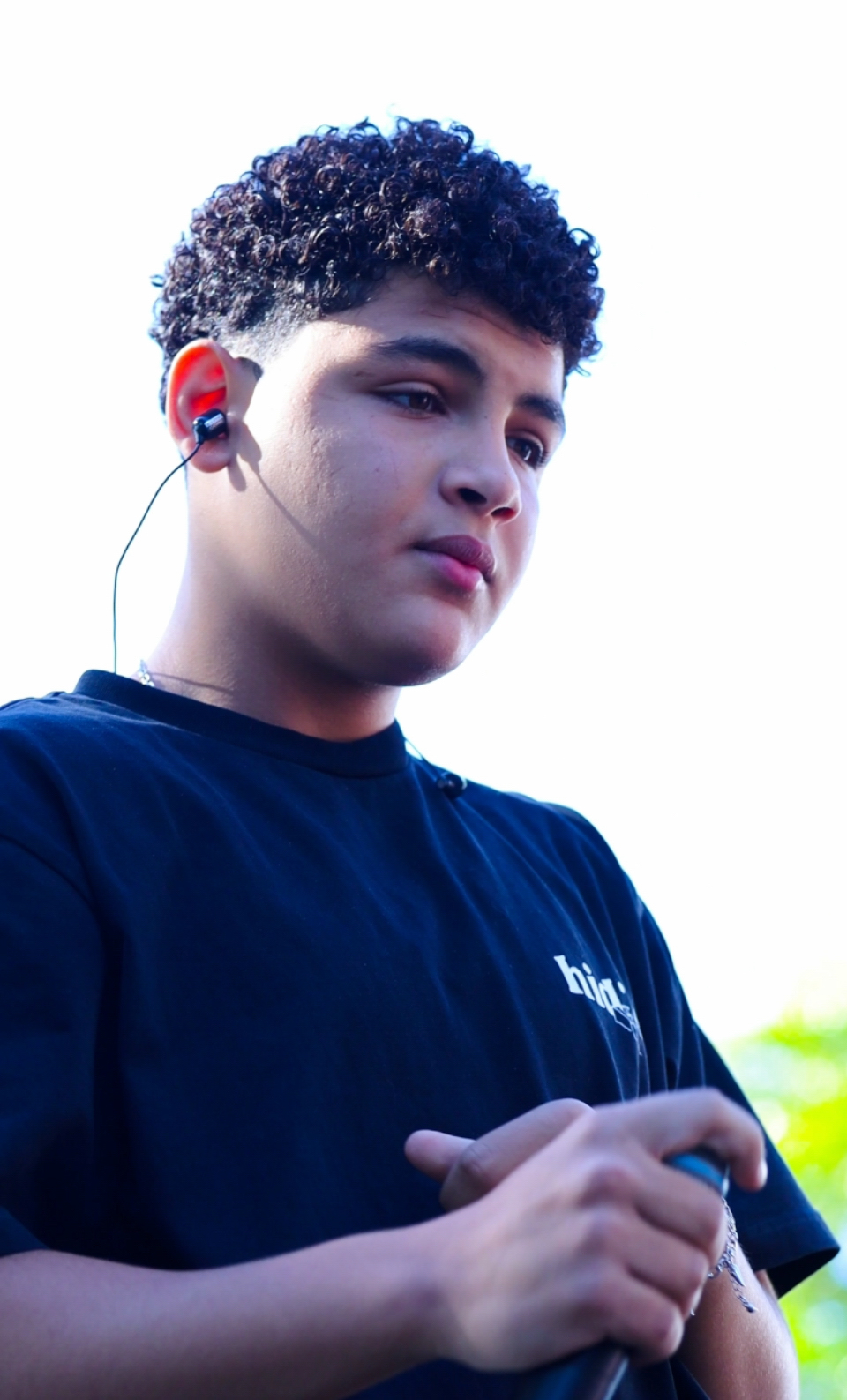
MC Abdul performing at UNRWA USA's Gaza 5k fundraising event in Dallas, Texas, on 28 September 2024

In 2020, Al-Shantti advocated on behalf of Palestinian families in Gaza who were bombed by releasing the song "Shouting at the Wall". Following the release, he caught the attention of the record label Empire. MC Abdul spoke about the importance of rapping as a tool for coping with challenging times saying “The power that I have in my pen when I'm writing, I am unstoppable. The microphone is the only escape possible”. In 2022, he performs his first concert as part of the FIFA World Cup festivities in Qatar.

In 2024, MC Abdul featured on Saint Levant's single "Deira" (about the destruction of Al Deira Hotel in an Israeli bombing), which has over 2.5 million streams on Spotify and over 2.9 million views on the music video on YouTube. The track is included in Saint Levant's debut album Deira.

He released his debut album, Day By Day, Shawy Shway, in October 2026.

== Artistry ==
Al-Shantti has cited Tupac, Eminem, and Nas as influences on his music.

== Discography ==
=== Studio albums ===
- Day By Day, Shawy Shway (2026)

=== Extended plays ===
- Can I Live (2024)

=== Singles ===
==== As lead artist ====
- "Shouting At The Wall" (2021)
- "Palestine [Freeverse]" (2021)
- "Can I Live" (2022)
- "It's All Good" (2023)
- "Killing The Game" (2023)
- "The Pen & The Sword" (2023)
- "I May Be Young" (2024)
- "Through My Eyes" (2025)
- "Light It Up" (2025)
- "Wait for Me" (featuring Nai Barghouti) (2026)
- "Wein Abdul?" (2026)
- "Shway Shway" (2026)

==== As featured artist ====
List of singles as lead artist, with selected chart positions, showing year released and album name
| Title | Year | Peak chart positions | Album or EP |
| Title | Year | LBN | Album or EP |
|---|---|---|---|
| "The Beat Never Goes Off" (Tamer Nafar featuring MC Abdul & Noel Kharman) | 2021 | — | In the name of the father, the Imam & John Lennon |
| "Deira" (Saint Levant featuring MC Abdul) | 2024 | 1 | Deira |
| "Hind's Hall 2" (Macklemore featuring Anees, Amer Zahr & MC Abdul) | 2024 | — | Non-album single |
