= Tomislav Ivčić =

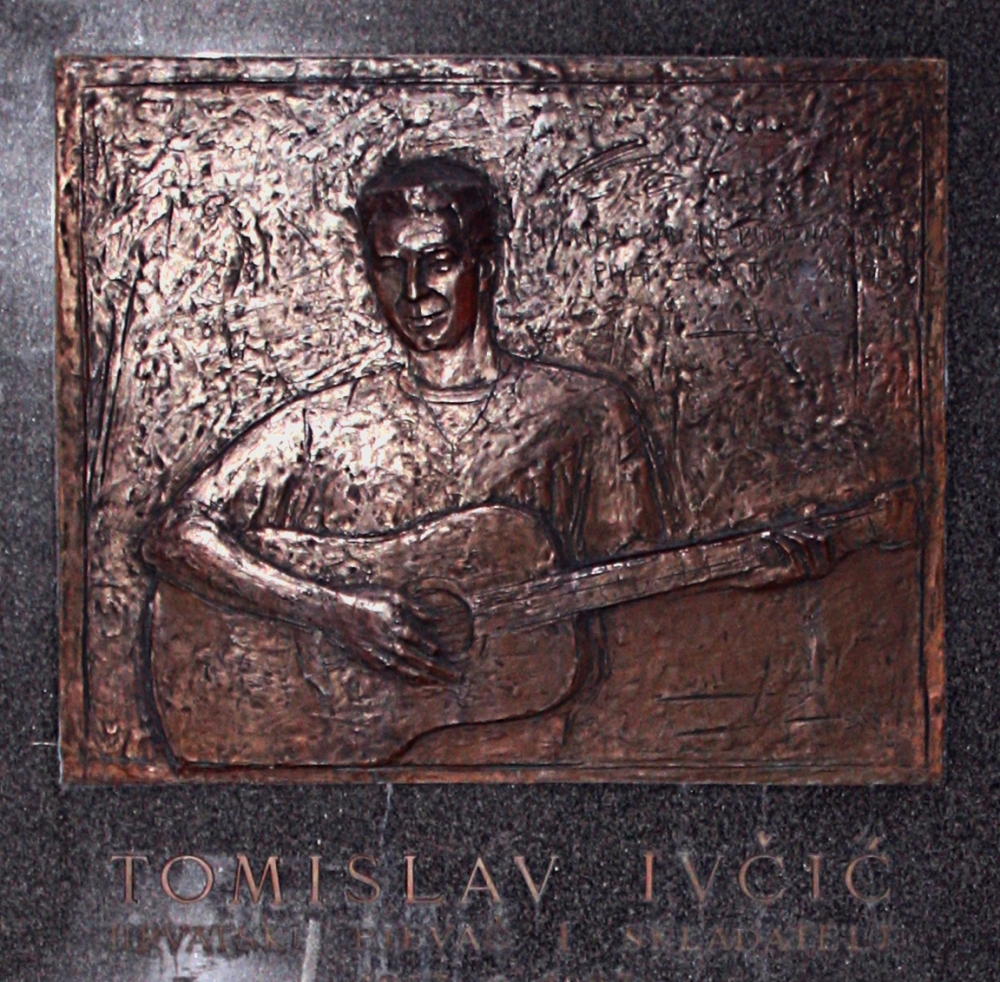

Background information
- Born: 6 January 1953; Zadar, PR Croatia, FPR Yugoslavia
- Died: 4 March 1993 (aged 40) Zagreb, Croatia
- Occupation: Singer
- Years active: 1970s–1993

Tomislav Ivčić (6 January 1953 – 4 March 1993) was a Croatian pop singer, songwriter and politician. He died in a car accident and is buried in Zagreb at the Mirogoj Cemetery.

== Life and career ==
A native of Zadar, Tomislav Ivčić became one of the most popular singers and songwriters following his appearances on 1970s pop music festivals. His specialty was pop music inspired by Dalmatian folklore. One of his early hits included the country-rock influenced single "Nemam za kavu" from 1979. Ivčić also wrote and performed "Večeras je naša fešta", a song that would become a semi-official anthem of Dalmatia, often sung and performed whenever a Dalmatian athlete or sports team won a title or important game. He wrote over two hundred songs and released twenty three albums during his career.

During the Croatian War of Independence, Ivčić wrote the song "Stop the War in Croatia" which charted in the Top 10 in Australia in 1991. In February 1993, he ran as an independent candidate for the House of Chambers in the Croatian Parliament and won a seat. A few weeks before he was supposed to take office, and shortly after a Globus interview in which he was described as the "first Croatian senator," his automobile was involved in a traffic accident that would claim the lives of him and three other people.

His older half-brother Đani Maršan is also an accomplished singer and songwriter, as well as his other older brother Vedran Ivčić, albeit to a lesser degree.

== Discography ==
=== Singles ===
List of singles, with selected chart positions
Title	Year	Peak chart positions
Title	Year	AUS
"Stop the War in Croatia"	1991	7

== Acknowledgements ==
- Honorary citizen of Zadar (2021)
