= Fucked Up (song) =

2025 song by Macklemore

Single by Macklemore
- Released: February 12, 2025
- Recorded: 2025
- Genre: Political hip hop; protest
- Length: 3:39
- Label: Bendo
- Songwriter: Ben Haggerty
- Producer: Macklemore

Macklemore singles chronology
"Hind's Hall 2" (2024)	"Fucked Up" (2025)

Music video
- "Fucked Up" on YouTube

"Fucked Up" (also stylized as "f****d up") is a protest song by American rapper Macklemore, released on February 12, 2025. The song criticizes Donald Trump, Elon Musk, and the Gaza war, continuing themes from Macklemore's 2024 singles "Hind's Hall" and "Hind's Hall 2". Sources differ on the exact release date, with Billboard reporting the song was posted to YouTube on Wednesday, February 12, while Rolling Stone described it as released on Thursday. As with his previous two singles, Macklemore said all proceeds from the song would go to UNRWA USA, a nonprofit that assists Palestinian refugees.

== Background ==
"Fucked Up" followed Macklemore's 2024 singles "Hind's Hall" and "Hind's Hall 2", both of which expressed support for Palestinians amid the Gaza war and drew renewed attention after Macklemore led a "fuck America" chant while performing "Hind's Hall 2" at a September 2024 benefit concert in Seattle. Macklemore later said of the chant, "My thoughts and feelings are not always expressed perfectly or politely. Sometimes, I slip up and get caught in the moment."

The song's release came roughly two weeks into Donald Trump's second presidential term, shortly after Trump proposed the United States take control of the Gaza Strip, and days after Elon Musk made a gesture at a Trump inauguration event that several outlets described as resembling a Nazi salute.

== Composition and lyrics ==
The song was self-produced by Macklemore. Rolling Stone's Andre Gee described the roughly three-minute, horn-driven track as opening with the line "The world's on fire, we don't own the water y'all," which he characterized as both a reference to the Los Angeles wildfires and a broader commentary on class disparity. In the song, Macklemore criticizes the Trump administration, Musk's role in the federal government, and mass deportation efforts by U.S. Immigration and Customs Enforcement, while also referencing ongoing conflicts in Gaza, Sudan, and the Democratic Republic of the Congo.

The music video, directed by Omar Alali, opens with a quote attributed to socialist Eugene V. Debs and features a montage of footage including pro-Palestinian and anti-Trump demonstrations, images of tech billionaires including Musk, Mark Zuckerberg, and Jeff Bezos, and a clip of Musk's inauguration-event gesture. The video also juxtaposes an image of a Palestinian child in Jenin raising his hands with a well-known photograph from the Warsaw Ghetto during the Holocaust, a comparison that was highlighted by several Jewish and pro-Israel outlets as controversial.

== Reception ==
Reception to "Fucked Up" split along ideological lines. The World Socialist Web Site's Ed Hightower gave the song a strongly positive review, praising it as a "powerful work" connecting the Gaza war to domestic issues including immigration enforcement, internet censorship, the Los Angeles wildfires, and economic inequality, and writing that Macklemore "deserves commendation and support" for a stance he described as bolder than that of other prominent musicians. Hightower noted that, at the time of his review, no major media outlet had yet published a review of the song.

Jewish and pro-Israel commentators were sharply critical. Jewish Telegraphic Agency's Ben Sales described the song and video as alleging "nefarious control of banks and the media," and noted its Warsaw Ghetto comparison drew criticism online, while reporting that the video had accumulated more than 14 million views on X. The Algemeiner's Shiryn Ghermezian wrote that the video "again accuses the Jewish state of genocide" and calls Israeli prime minister Benjamin Netanyahu a "colonizer." On social media, Disturbed frontman David Draiman, a vocal supporter of Israel, criticized what he characterized as insufficient pushback from Jewish public figures against the song.

== Charts ==
Chart performance for "Fucked Up"
Chart (2025)	Peak position
US R&B/Hip-Hop Digital Song Sales (Billboard)	9
