= Amer Zahr =

Jordanian-American comedian, filmmaker, and activist

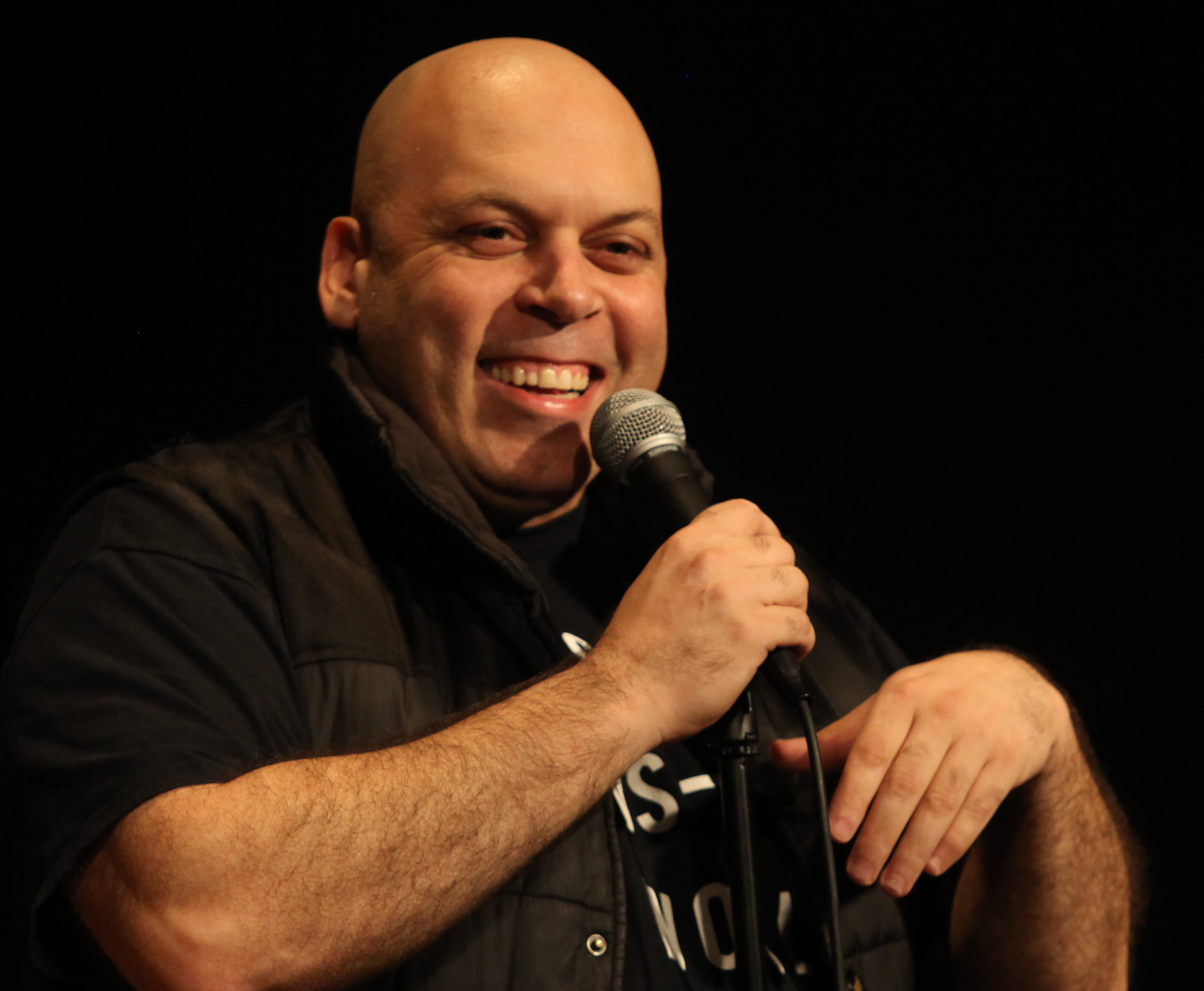
- Born: 1977 (age 48–49); Jordan
- Education: University of Michigan (BA, MA, JD)
- Website: Official website

Amer Zahr (Arabic: عامر زهر; born 1977) is a Palestinian-American author, comedian and political activist.

== Early life ==
Zahr was born in Jordan to refugee parents of Palestinian heritage originally from Nazareth, and then moved to the United States when he was three years old. His father is Christian and his mother is Muslim, and he was raised with both traditions in the Philadelphia area.

== Career ==
In 2013, Zahr founded the "1001 Laughs Dearborn Comedy Festival," which continues annually. He wrote "Being a Palestinian Makes Me Smile" and made the documentary We’re Not White, which was released in August 2017.

In 2016, Zahr served as a national surrogate for presidential candidate Bernie Sanders.

Jill Stein, the presumptive Green Party nominee for President, was reportedly considering Zahr to be her running mate in the 2024 United States presidential election, despite his being Constitutionally ineligible for the office.

== Personal life ==
Zahr lives, and is based in, Dearborn, Michigan. He is an adjunct professor at the University of Detroit Mercy School of Law. Zahr also holds Israeli citizenship through his mother, who was born in Acre, Israel.
