= Saint Levant discography =

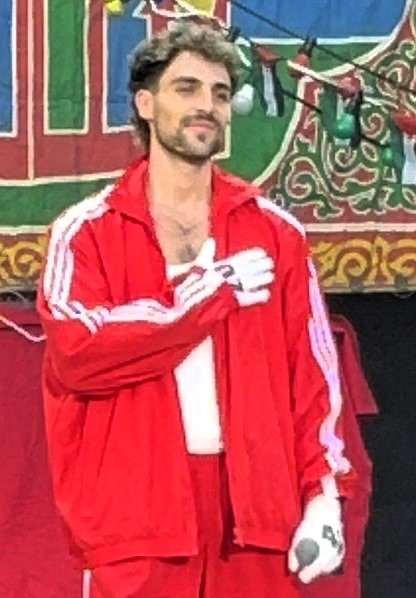
- Saint Levant on stage in Madrid in July 2025
- Studio albums: 2
- EPs: 2
- Singles: 35
- Music videos: 28

The discography of Palestinian rapper and singer Saint Levant includes two studio albums, two extended plays (EPs), thirty-five singles (including four as a featured artist), and twenty-eight music videos.

After his breakthrough with "Jerusalem Freestyle" and "Nirvana in Gaza" in 2020, Saint Levant went viral with "Very Few Friends" at the end of 2022, rising to mainstream popularity. Since then, he has collaborated with a number of artists on both his singles and albums – including EPs From Gaza, with Love (2023) and Love Letters (2025), charting in both Western and MENA countries. He has been signed with Universal Arabic Music (UAM) since 2024, when he released his debut studio album Deira. A second studio album, Afandi, was released in August 2026.

== Albums ==
| Title | Album details | Peak chart positions | | |
| Title | Album details | BEL (WA) | FRA | SWI |
|---|---|---|---|---|
| Deira | Release date: June 7, 2024; Label: SALXCO, UAM; Formats: digital download, streaming, vinyl | 131 | 84 | 35 |
| Afandi / افندي | Release date: August 21, 2026; Label: SALXCO, UAM; Formats: digital download, streaming, vinyl | — | — | — |

== Extended plays ==
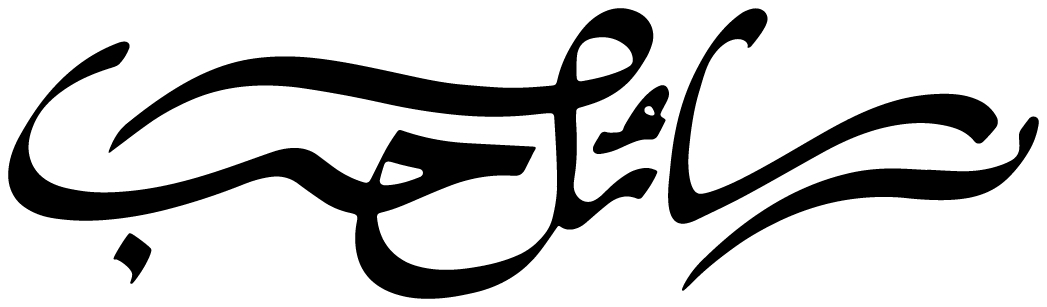
Promotional logo artwork for Love Letters / رسائل حب

| Title | EP details |
|---|---|
| From Gaza, with Love | Release date: March 6, 2023; Label: 2048; Formats: digital download, streaming |
| Love Letters / رسائل حب | Release date: February 14, 2025; Label: SALXCO, UAM; Formats: digital download, streaming |

== Singles ==
=== As lead artist ===
List of singles as lead artist, with selected chart positions, showing year released and album name
| Title | Year | Peak chart positions | | | | | | Album or EP |
| Title | Year | ARB | EGY | LBN | MENA | KSA | UAE | Album or EP |
|---|---|---|---|---|---|---|---|---|
| "Jerusalem Freestyle" | 2020 | * | | — | * | * | | Non-album singles |
| "Nirvana in Gaza" | 2020 | * | | — | * | * | | Non-album singles |
| "7ajir" | 2021 | * | | — | * | * | | Non-album singles |
| "Tourist" | 2021 | * | | — | * | * | | Non-album singles |
| "Haifa in a Tesla" | 2021 | * | | — | * | * | | Non-album singles |
| "Desert Rose" (feat. Bayou) | 2021 | * | | — | * | * | | Non-album singles |
| "Sahrawi" | 2021 | * | | — | * | * | | Non-album singles |
| "1001 Nights" | 2021 | * | | — | * | * | | Non-album singles |
| "Jon Carlow Freestyle" (feat. Jon Carlow) | 2022 | * | | — | * | * | | Non-album singles |
| "Nasser" | 2022 | * | | — | * | * | | Non-album singles |
| "Caged Birds Sing" | 2022 | * | | — | * | * | | Non-album singles |
| "Mandela" | 2022 | * | | — | * | * | | Non-album singles |
| "Tête à Tête / Eye to Eye" | 2022 | * | | — | * | * | | Non-album singles |
| "By the Sea" | 2022 | * | | — | * | * | | Non-album singles |
| "One More Time" | 2022 | * | | — | * | * | | Non-album singles |
| "Baby" | 2022 | * | | — | * | * | | Non-album singles |
| "Mistakes" | 2022 | * | | — | * | * | | Non-album singles |
| "Here and There" (feat. Bayou) | 2022 | * | | — | * | * | | Non-album singles |
| "Very Few Friends" | 2022 | * | | — | * | * | | From Gaza, with Love |
| "I Guess" (feat. Playyard) | 2022 | * | | — | — | * | | Non-album single |
| "FaceTime" | 2023 | * | | — | — | * | | From Gaza, with Love |
| "Nails" | 2023 | * | | — | — | * | | Non-album single |
| "Deira" (feat. MC Abdul) | 2024 | 7 | — | 1 | — | — | — | Deira |
| "5am in Paris" | 2024 | 29 | — | — | — | — | — | Deira |
| "Galbi" | 2024 | — | — | 2 | — | — | — | Deira |
| "Daloona / دلعونة" (feat. 47Soul, Shadi Alborini and Qasem AlNajjar) | 2024 | 65 | — | — | — | — | — | Love Letters |
| "Wazira / وزيرة" | 2025 | 11 | — | 18 | — | — | — | Love Letters |
| "Exile / معاكي" | 2025 | — | — | — | — | — | — | Love Letters |
| "Sabah El Ward / صباح الورد" | 2026 | 2 | — | 9 | 8 | — | 7 | Afandi |
| "Nano" (with Tul8te) | 2026 | 2 | 1 | 6 | 2 | 3 | 3 | Non-album singles |
| "Bahebbek" (Note: Also spelled "Bahibek" in official releases. Lebanese Arabic: بحبك.) (with Haifa Wehbe) | 2026 | 12 | — | 20 | 12 | 15 | — | Non-album singles |
| "Mitsubishi / متسوبيشي" (with Haifa Wehbe) | 2026 | 6 | — | 2 | 10 | — | 13 | Afandi |
| "Maskara / مسكرة" (with Mohammed Assaf) | 2026 | 13 | — | — | — | — | 9 | Afandi |
"—" denotes a recording that did not chart or was not released in that territory. "*" denotes that the chart did not exist at that time.

=== As featured artist ===
List of singles as featured artist, with selected chart positions, showing year released and album name
| Title | Year | Peak chart positions | Album or EP |
| Title | Year | ARB | Album or EP |
|---|---|---|---|
| "Balak" (Zeyne feat. Saint Levant) | 2022 | 87 | Non-album singles |
| "Nasty" (Zeina feat. Saint Levant) | 2023 | — | Non-album singles |
| "Sak Pase" (Michaël Brun feat. Saint Levant and Lolo Zouaï) | 2023 | — | Non-album singles |
| "Men Alby / من قلبي" (Tamer Hosny feat. Saint Levant) | 2026 | 85 | Non-album singles |
"—" denotes a recording that did not chart or was not released in that territory.

== Other charted songs ==
List of other charted songs as lead artist, with selected chart positions, showing year released and album name
| Title | Year | Peak chart positions | | | | | | Album or EP |
| Title | Year | ARB | EGY | LBN | MENA | KSA | UAE | Album or EP |
|---|---|---|---|---|---|---|---|---|
| "On This Land" (feat. Sol Band) | 2024 | 26 | — | — | — | — | — | Deira |
| "Let Her Go" (feat. Cheb Bilal) | 2024 | 41 | — | — | — | — | — | Deira |
| "Allah Yihmeeki" (feat. Kehlani) | 2024 | 9 | — | 1 | — | — | — | Deira |
| "Kalamantina / كلمنتينا" | 2025 | 2 | 6 | 3 | 3 | 9 | 19 | Love Letters |
| "Diva / بنت الذهبية" | 2025 | — | — | 13 | — | — | — | Love Letters |
| "Nari Nari Nari / ناري ناري ناري" | 2025 | 13 | — | — | — | — | — | Love Letters (Deluxe) |
| "Do You Love Me? / سنيورة" (feat. Fares Sokar) | 2025 | 7 | 5 | 3 | 15 | — | — | Love Letters (Deluxe) |
| "Samra / سمرة" (feat. Babylone) | 2025 | — | — | 19 | — | — | — | Love Letters (Deluxe) |
"—" denotes a recording that did not chart or was not released in that territory.

== Music videos ==
List of music videos
| Title | Year | Other artist(s) | Guest star(s) | Director(s) | Ref. |
|---|---|---|---|---|---|
| "Jerusalem Freestyle" (Lyric video) | 2020 | —N/a | —N/a | @rotae-palestine | |
| "7ajir" | 2021 | —N/a | —N/a | Unknown | |
| "Haifa in a Tesla" | 2021 | —N/a | —N/a | Unknown | |
| "Sahrawi" | 2021 | —N/a | —N/a | Diego Villanueva, Drew Nelson | |
| "1001 Nights" | 2021 | —N/a | —N/a | Diego Villanueva | |
| "Mandela" | 2022 | —N/a | —N/a | Unknown | |
| "By the Sea" | 2022 | —N/a | —N/a | Diego Villanueva | |
| "One More Time / Baby" | 2022 | —N/a | —N/a | Diego Villanueva | |
| "Mistakes" | 2022 | —N/a | —N/a | Diego Villanueva | |
| "Very Few Friends" | 2022 | —N/a | —N/a | Carlos Ramirez | |
| "I Guess" | 2022 | Playyard | —N/a | Zaid Wazzan | |
| "Tell Me I'm Dreaming" | 2023 | —N/a | —N/a | Carlos Ramirez | |
| "From Gaza, with Love" (Lyric video) | 2023 | —N/a | —N/a | Pedro Damasceno | |
| "Nails" | 2023 | —N/a | Mia Khalifa | Mattias Russo-Larsson | |
| "Deira" | 2024 | MC Abdul | —N/a | Mattias Russo-Larsson | |
| "5am in Paris" | 2024 | —N/a | —N/a | Carlos Ramirez | |
| "Galbi" | 2024 | —N/a | Naïka | Carlos Ramirez | |
| "Comme c'est beau" | 2024 | —N/a | —N/a | Pedro Damasceno, William Chapin | |
| "Forgive Me" | 2024 | TIF | —N/a | Pedro Damasceno, William Chapin | |
| "Let Her Go" | 2024 | Cheb Bilal | —N/a | Pedro Damasceno, William Chapin | |
| "Allah Yihmeeki" | 2024 | Kehlani | —N/a | Pedro Damasceno, William Chapin | |
| "On This Land" | 2024 | Sol Band | —N/a | Pedro Damasceno, William Chapin | |
| "Daloona / دلعونة" | 2024 | 47Soul, Shadi Alborini, Qasem AlNajjar | —N/a | Tarzan and Arab Nasser | |
| "Exile / معاكي" | 2025 | —N/a | —N/a | Lyna Zerrouki | |
| "Diva" | 2025 | —N/a | —N/a | Lyna Zerrouki, Valentin Guiod | |
| "Do You Love Me? / سنيورة" | 2025 | Fares Sokar | —N/a | Abanoub Ramsis | |
| "Sabah El Ward / صباح الورد" | 2026 | —N/a | Yasmina Zaytoun | Mohamed Sqalli, Saint Levant | |
| "Maskara / مسكرة" | 2026 | Mohammed Assaf | Al-Ajaweed | Bishop Nast, Saint Levant, Mohamed Sqalli | |
