= Saint Levant =

Palestinian rapper and musician (born 2000)

Saint Levant سانت ليفانت
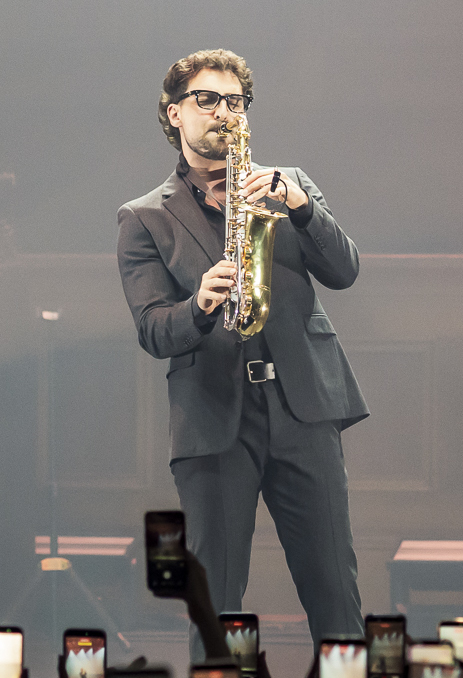
- Saint Levant performing at Melbourne Town Hall as part of the Rising arts festival, June 2026

Background information
- Born: Marwan Abdelhamid; October 6, 2000 (age 26); Jerusalem, Palestine
- Origin: California, U.S.
- Genres: Pop; R&B; alternative R&B; hip hop; Palestinian hip hop; Arab pop; world music
- Occupations: Rapper; singer; songwriter; musician
- Instruments: Vocals; guitar; saxophone; piano
- Works: Discography
- Years active: 2020–present
- Labels: Peace Hill Records (2020); Impact Records (2020); Levantine Music Group (2021); 2048 (2021–2023); MDLBEAST Records (2023); Universal Arabic Music (2024–); SALXCO (2024–)
- Partner: Naïka (2023–2025)
- Website: saintlevant.com

Marwan Abdelhamid (Arabic: مروان عبد الحميد; born October 6, 2000), known professionally as Saint Levant (French: [sɛ̃ ləvɑ̃]; Arabic: سانت ليفانت), is a Palestinian singer-songwriter and rapper. A multilingual artist, he became known for his 2022 song "Very Few Friends". As of August 2026, he has released two EPs and two studio albums, and has toured in the Middle East, Europe, the US, and Australia.

== Early life and education ==
Marwan Abdelhamid was born on October 6, 2000 in Jerusalem at the start of the Second Intifada to an Algerian-French mother, Maria Mohammedi, and a Palestinian-Serbian father, Rashid Abdelhamid, who were both raised in Algeria. His father, the son of a Serbian medical doctor and a Palestinian from Safad who studied engineering in Yugoslavia following his expulsion as a child in 1948, has worked as an architect, hotel entrepreneur, DJ and film producer; his mother, the daughter of a French female pianist and former music teacher at the French lycée in Algiers, has worked for UNRWA. He has a younger brother, named Khaled.

Shortly after Abdelhamid's birth, the family joined his paternal grandparents in the Gaza Strip, where his parents built a 22-room beachfront hotel in Rimal based on an architectural project by his father, named "Al Deira". He spent his childhood primarily there, attending the American International School, until the 2007 Battle of Gaza, after which he and his family relocated to Amman, Jordan. He has described the time spent in Gaza as "the best years of [his] life".

Abdelhamid took up the passion for music from his father and his maternal grandmother, studying piano and saxophone. Growing up, he communicated in French at home, English at school, and Arabic at the Palestinian refugee camp of Al-Wehdat, where he played football with the local team after school.

In 2018, aged 17, Abdelhamid moved to the United States to pursue a bachelor's degree in International Relations at the University of California, Santa Barbara, from which he graduated in 2022.

== Musical career ==
Before taking on the name Saint Levant (a pun on French luxury fashion brand Yves Saint Laurent and his native Levant region), Abdelhamid wrote "Jerusalem Freestyle" and "Nirvana in Gaza", both of which discussed political issues. Around the same time, he began posting videos on TikTok in which he discussed Palestinian history, as well as commentary on toxic masculinity in Arab culture.

In November 2022, Saint Levant released his trilingual (English, French, and Arabic) rap track "Very Few Friends", which was streamed approximately 2 million YouTube views in one month. The song soon became popular on TikTok and Instagram, as well as on Spotify, where it peaked at number 1 in nineteen countries and number 2 in the United States, and reached number 2 on the Global Viral 50 chart.

In 2023, Saint Levant released the EP From Gaza, with Love. He was named among the 2023 "Men of the Year" by GQ Middle East. In 2024, he signed with Universal Arabic Music (UAM) and released, together with MC Abdul, "Deira", a song in the chaabi musical style of Algiers dedicated to his father's hotel in Gaza, which went destroyed in an Israeli bombing in January 2024 during Israel's war on Gaza; the song featured as the title track on his debut album Deira, containing duets with other artists like Cheb Bilal and Kehlani. Saint Levant performed at Coachella 2024, using his performance to bring awareness to the ongoing war taking place in Gaza. The following 22 May, he was part of the lineup of a Palestine charity concert at Zénith Paris, whose revenue was destined to Medical Aid for Palestinians.

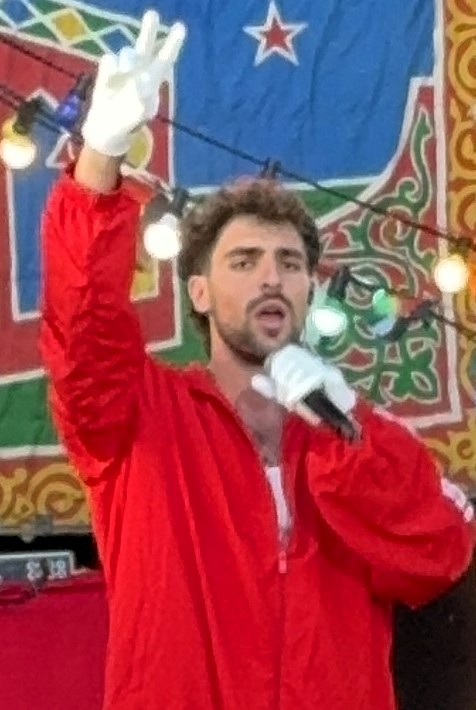
Saint Levant performing in Madrid, July 2025

On February 14, 2025, on the occasion of Saint Valentine's Day, Saint Levant released the EP Love Letters / رسائل حب, divided between a "side A" (Love Letters from Saint Levant) and a "side B" (رسائل حب من مروان, Rasāʾil ḥubb min Marwān), and featuring three unreleased tracks out of six. A deluxe edition of the album was released on August 22, 2025, featuring four bonus tracks which included three collaborations with North African artists – namely Tunisian rapper Nordo, Egyptian mahraganat singer Fares Sokkar, and Algerian band Babylone.

Following the release of the singles "Sabah El Ward" (صباح الورد) and "Nano", in early June 2026 Saint Levant was touring Australia. After playing to a sold-out crowd on June 4 at Melbourne Town Hall as part of Rising festival, he played at City Recital Hall in Sydney as part of Vivid Sydney, and then at Princess Theatre in Brisbane. On August 21, 2026, Saint Levant released his second studio album, Afandi / افندي, his first album release entirely in Arabic, which had been anticipated by "Sabah El Ward" and the Haifa Wehbe collaboration "Mitsubishi"; the third single from the album was "Maskara" (مسكرة) with Mohammed Assaf. The release is accompanied by a world tour originally scheduled between August and December 2026; the North American dates were later postponed until spring 2027 due to issues related to new US visa requirements for immigrants.

== Other ventures ==
In May 2023, Saint Levant was chosen as Dior's first fragrance ambassador in the Middle East.

On February 17, 2025, he featured alongside Lourdes Leon in a promotional video for Yves Saint Laurent and Peter Park's new omakase restaurant Sushi Park Paris.

In July 2025, cosmetics brand Huda Beauty launched a new shade and scent of lip oil in partnership with Saint Levant, named "Kalamantina" (كلمنتينا, Arabic for 'clementine') after a track from his latest album.

In June 2026, Abdelhamid became Prada's first Palestinian brand ambassador, for the 2027 spring/summer season.

== Artistry, activism, and public image ==
Saint Levant cites artists like Wyclef Jean, Cheb Khaled, Fairuz, Marwan Moussa, Lenny Kravitz, Michael Jackson, Stromae, Timbaland, Eminem, Mika, and Bruno Mars as providing inspiration for his music.

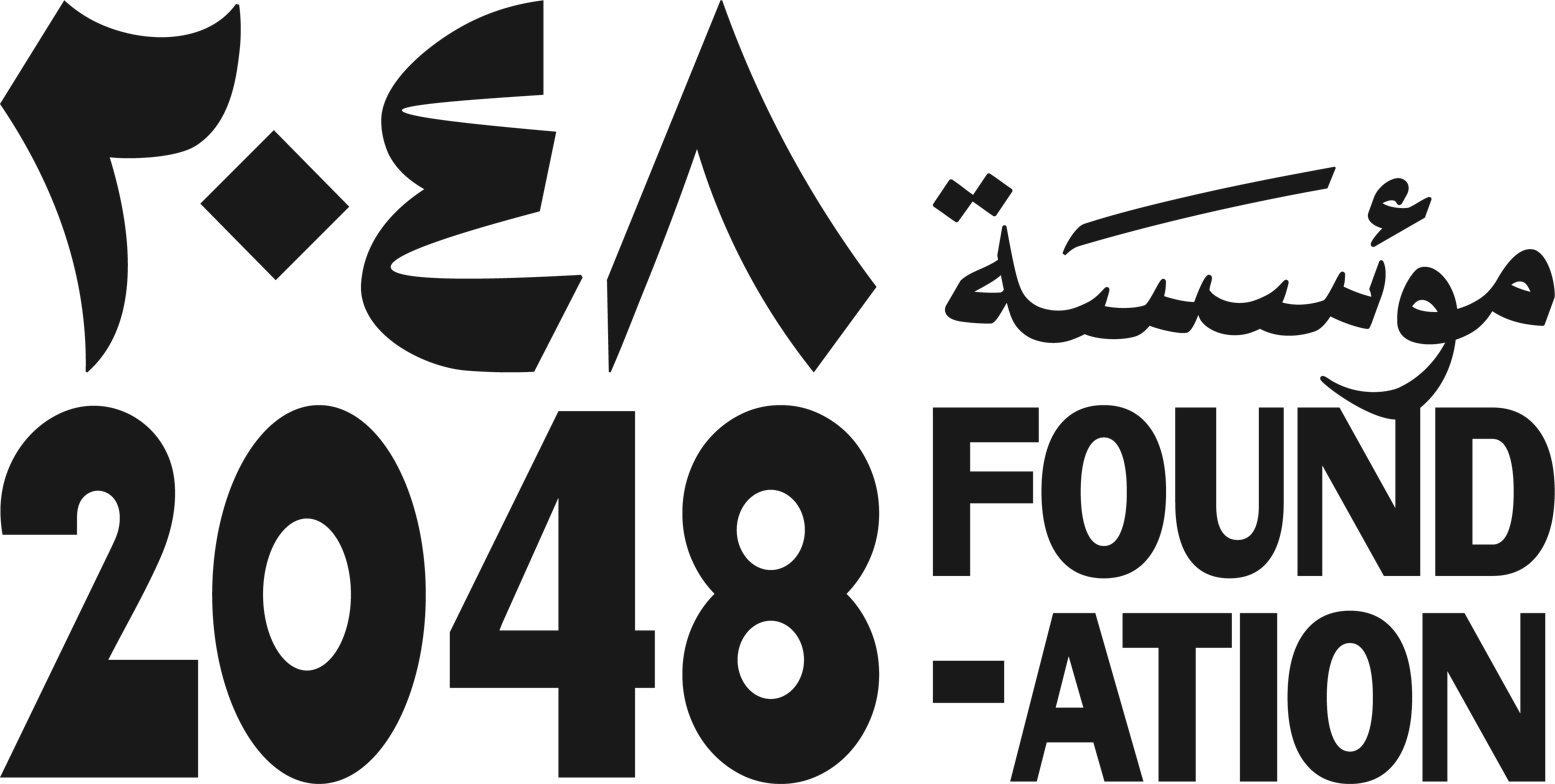
Logo of the 2048 Foundation

Early in his career, Abdelhamid co-founded GrowHome, which connects Palestinian entrepreneurs with individuals who can help fund their projects. In early 2022, alongside Stephanie Moukhaiber, he started the 2048 Fellowship – a project providing financial support and mentorship for Palestinian creatives; its name, which was changed to "2048 Foundation" in 2024, references the 100th anniversary of the Nakba. In early 2026, the foundation launched the $5,000 Loubani Grants, destined to 40 Palestinian artists.

Saint Levant is outspoken on the struggle in Palestine, telling Harper's Bazaar:

"Everything that I do is Israeli-focused and based on the Palestinian cause and struggle, doing a lot of contextualizing [...] because I came to America, man, and I realized that a lot of people thought that [...] it's a conflict between these two equal[s who] just hate each other for some reason, [that] Palestinians just hate Israelis. And what people don't understand is that it's 80 years of occupation and oppression and displacement and ethnic cleansing, so I think it's very important to just push that forward always and I try to do it through the music; I try to do it through my actions, and everything that I do."

Following the outbreak of the Gaza war, Saint Levant has stated that a sense of "survivor's guilt" has contributed to shaping his artistic production.

Abdelhamid identifies as having a feminist upbringing, with much of his early social media content focusing on women's rights.

=== Criticism ===
In February 2025, pro-Israel groups and media criticized Yves Saint Laurent's collaboration with Abdelhamid as a partnership with an "antisemite" (reportedly for "anti-Jewish statements" which included support for the attacks against Maccabi Tel Aviv fans in November 2024), and called for boycotting the brand. A similar reaction was prompted by Prada's 2026 ambassador announcement, which featured the rapper wearing a silver neck pendant in the shape of historic Palestine; aside from Abdelhamid's "hate" history, some felt his necklace promoted the erasure of the state of Israel, otherwise viewed as endorsement of a one-state solution.

Saint Levant's shade of lip oil produced for Huda Beauty in July 2025, "Kalamantina", was promoted with various videos featuring him and Huda Kattan surrounded by clementines, with proceeds originally intended to fund projects for Palestinian agriculture and cultural preservation. The move, whose timing coincided with the most critical stage of Israel's starvation of Gaza and its daily shootings of Palestinian aid seekers, was met with mixed feelings; a social media user called it "tone deaf", while Palestinian Pulitzer Prize winner Mosab Abu Toha criticized it as insensitive to Gazans' "feelings as human beings" regardless of financial support. In response, Kattan chose to instead donate 100% of the campaign proceeds to Doctors Without Borders for their work in Gaza.

On August 1, 2026, Saint Levant was the object of "SLV", a diss track in which fellow Palestinian rapper Shabjdeed criticized his mainstream commercial success and accused him of commodifying the Palestinian cause, using it as a mere aesthetic to light-themed works in order to appeal to Western audiences. The song sparked a debate over Palestinian representation amid the Gaza genocide, and has brought up the question of the national identity of a people with different lived experiences in different parts of Palestine and the diaspora.

== Personal life ==
Abdelhamid is a Muslim. He lives in Los Angeles, though he regularly returns to Amman.

In December 2023, he started a relationship with French-Haitian singer Naïka; the couple announced their breakup via Instagram on September 25, 2025.

== Discography ==
=== Albums ===
- Deira (2024)
- Afandi / افندي (2026)

=== EPs ===
- From Gaza, with Love (2023)
- Love Letters / رسائل حب (2025)

== Tours ==
=== Deira Tour (2024) ===
Date	City	Country	Venue
September 22	Austin, Texas	United States	Emo's
September 23	Houston, Texas	United States	Warehouse Live
September 25	Dallas, Texas	United States	The Studio at The Factory
September 28	Los Angeles, California	United States	The Fonda Theatre
September 30	San Francisco, California	United States	The Fillmore
October 1	San Francisco, California	United States	The Independent
October 4	Vancouver, British Columbia	Canada	Commodore Ballroom
October 6	Seattle, Washington	United States	The Showbox
October 7	Portland, Oregon	United States	Wonder Ballroom
October 15	Nantes	France	Stereolux
October 17	Paris	France	L'Olympia
October 28	Marseille	France	Espace Julien
October 30	Milan	Italy	Alcatraz
November 1	Lausanne	Switzerland	Les Docks
November 2	Munich	Germany	Strom
November 4	Berlin	Germany	Metropol
November 6	Stockholm	Sweden	Debaser
November 8	Oslo	Norway	Cosmopolite
November 12	Amsterdam	Netherlands	Paradiso
November 13	Copenhagen	Denmark	Pumpehuset
November 16	Zurich	Switzerland	Plaza Klub
November 18	Brussels	Belgium	Ancienne Belgique
November 20	Manchester	England	New Century Hall
November 23	Glasgow	Scotland	SWG3 Warehouse
November 27	Dublin	Ireland	The Academy
November 28	London	England	Kentish Town Forum
December 8	Montreal, Quebec	Canada	M Telus
December 9	Toronto, Ontario	Canada	Danforth Music Hall
December 11	Boston, Massachusetts	United States	Citizens House of Blues
December 12	Washington, D.C.	United States	9:30 Club
December 13	New York, New York	United States	Terminal 5
December 15	Detroit, Michigan	United States	Saint Andrew's Hall
December 16	Chicago, Illinois	United States	Metro

=== Afandi World Tour (2026–27) ===
Date	City	Country	Venue
August 1	London	England	Mahrajan Festival at Crystal Palace Bowl
August 13	Amman	Jordan	Abdali Downtown
August 15	Kfardebian	Lebanon	Ahlam Village at Mzaar Ski Resort
October 29	Dublin	Ireland	National Stadium
November 2	Paris	France	Zénith
November 3	Paris	France	Zénith
November 5	Antwerp	Belgium	De Roma
November 6	Antwerp	Belgium	De Roma
November 9	Cologne	Germany	Carlswerk Victoria
November 11	Luxembourg City	Luxembourg	Rockhal
November 13	Utrecht	Netherlands	TivoliVredenburg
November 14	Amsterdam	Netherlands	Melkweg
November 16	Berlin	Germany	Columbiahalle
November 18	Copenhagen	Denmark	Vega
November 19	Oslo	Norway	Rockefeller Music Hall
November 21	Stockholm	Sweden	Fållan
November 24	Zurich	Switzerland	Komplex 457
November 26	Milan	Italy	Alcatraz
November 28	Barcelona	Spain	Razzmatazz
November 30	Madrid	Spain	La Riviera
December 1	Lisbon	Portugal	Lisboa ao Vivo
December 3	Casablanca	Morocco	Complex Mohammed V
December 8	Athens	Greece	Floyd
December 10	Istanbul	Turkey	Volkswagen Arena
December 11	Doha	Qatar	900 Park
December 12	Muscat	Oman	Muscat Eat 9 at Sultan Qaboos Sports Complex
December 19	Dubai	United Arab Emirates	Dopa World Festival at Jubilee Park, Expo City
TBA spring 2027	Boston, Massachusetts	United States	Citizens House of Blues
TBA spring 2027	Brooklyn, New York	United States	Brooklyn Paramount
TBA spring 2027	Toronto, Ontario	Canada	History
TBA spring 2027	Silver Spring, Maryland	United States	The Fillmore
TBA spring 2027	Detroit, Michigan	United States	The Fillmore
TBA spring 2027	Chicago, Illinois	United States	House of Blues
TBA spring 2027	Philadelphia, Pennsylvania	United States	Theatre of Living Arts
TBA spring 2027	Atlanta, Georgia	United States	Buckhead Theatre
TBA spring 2027	Charlotte, North Carolina	United States	The Underground
TBA spring 2027	Miami Beach, Florida	United States	The Fillmore at Jackie Gleason Theatre
TBA spring 2027	Dallas, Texas	United States	South Side Ballroom
TBA spring 2027	Austin, Texas	United States	Stubb's Waller Creek Amphitheater
TBA spring 2027	Houston, Texas	United States	Bayou Music Center
TBA spring 2027	Denver, Colorado	United States	Summit Music Hall
TBA spring 2027	Los Angeles, California	United States	The Wiltern
TBA spring 2027	San Diego, California	United States	SOMA
TBA spring 2027	Anaheim, California	United States	House of Blues
TBA spring 2027	San Francisco, California	United States	The Masonic
TBA spring 2027	Portland, Oregon	United States	Crystal Ballroom
