= Mzaar Kfardebian =

Ski area in Lebanon

Coordinates: 34°00′39.90″N 35°49′29.38″E

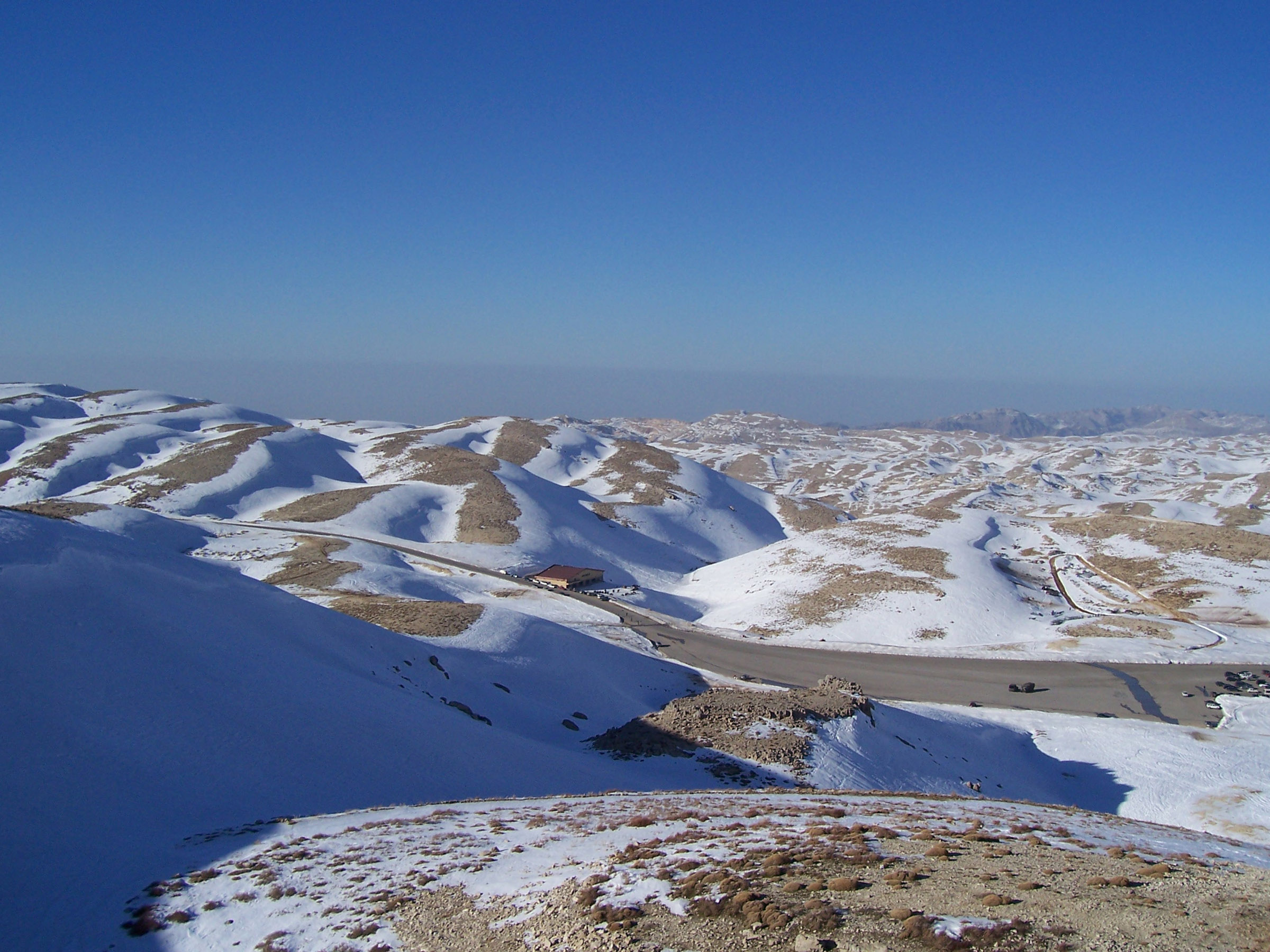
Mountains half covered by the snow in Kfardebian

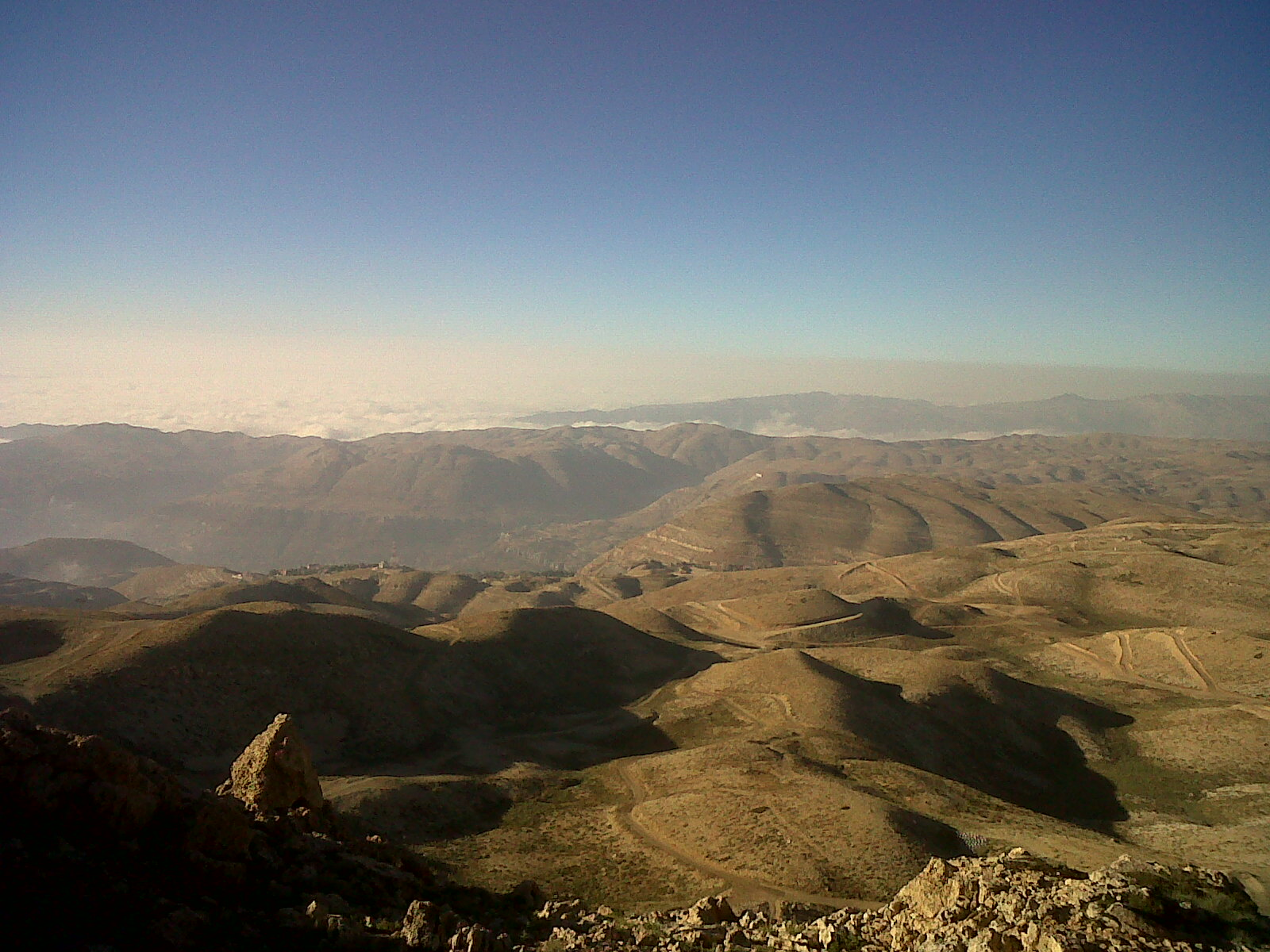
Oyoun el Siman in Kfardebian

Mzaar Kfardebian (Arabic: مزار كفردبيان), formerly Faraya Mzaar, is a ski area in Lebanon and the largest ski resort in the Middle East. It is located in Faraya and Kfardebian, one hour away from the capital Beirut. It is also referred to as Ouyoune el Simane (Arabic: عيون السيمان, lit. 'Quail Springs') after the mountain on which it lies.

== History ==
In 1960, Sami Geammal, Emile Riachi and a group of pioneers installed the first ski lift imported from Switzerland, on the "refuge" hill and built the first four chalets in the region. One year later, they bought 160,000 square metres (40 acres) of property from Prosper Gay-Para in order to expand the resort area.

In 1963, the Faraya Mzaar - Tourism and Winter Sports Company acquired the concession to build and operate ski lifts on lands belonging to the Kesrouan district municipalities. In 1965, the Mzaar Hotel opened its doors, and the company installed the first chairlift on the Jabal Dib Hills. The junction between "Refuge" and "Jabal Dib" was achieved in 1968 through the installation of the resort's third lift which was named "Jonction".

In the 1980s, during the civil war, the Mzaar Company was taken over by the Saudi Group al Mabani. In 1993, after the Lebanese civil war ended, the new group started expansion of the resort. In 2012, the resort's number of lifts reached 20 with around 80 kilometres (50 mi) of slopes.

== Etymology ==
Mzaar is the Arabic word for 'shrine' or 'sanctuary'. The highest peak in Ouyoune el Simane was called Jabal el-Mzaar ('Mountain of the Shrine') after a small Roman temple built on its top. It is believed that the Romans were using fire as signals to communicate between the coastal area and Baalbeck (or Heliopolis) through Faqra and the Mzaar peak.

The official name of the area is Ouyoune el Simane, which means 'Quail Springs', and it is administratively under the jurisdiction of the municipality of Kfardebian, which is also the case for the Faqra ski resort.

== Skiing area ==
Ski season usually stretches from early December to early April.

The peaks of the Mzaar-Kfardebian mountain range vary between heights of 1,913 and 2,465 metres (6,276 and 8,087 ft). The highest peak is Mzaar, followed by Wardeh and Jabal Dib (mountain of the wolf) Peak. Three other peaks are well suited for beginners, and even more are adapted to skier of intermediate level. In addition, there are a number of cross-country trails. Usually, opening hours during the week is from 8am to 3:30pm but it extends until 4pm during the weekend. A variety of other activities and excursions are also available.

Along with traditional alpine skiing, people can practice ski-doo, night skiing, snow boarding. Entertainment such as ski shows and fashion shows are organized to promote the resort.

== Natural and historical sites ==
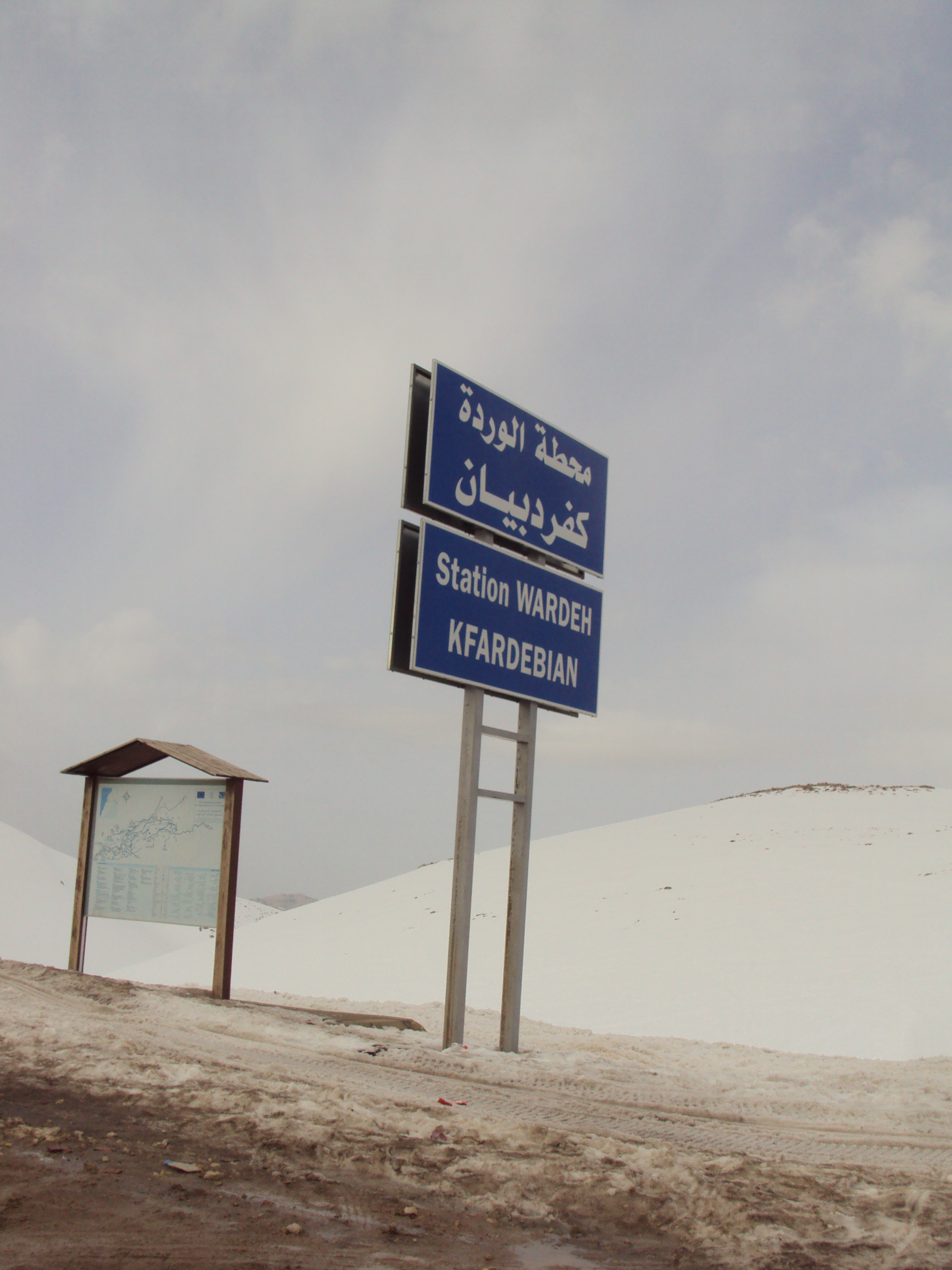
Warde Station

On the way to the ruins of Qalaat Faqra, one can see a natural water-crafted bridge called "Jisr al-Hajar" or the "Stone Bridge" with an arch measuring 38 metres (125 ft).

== Ski clubs ==
Mzaar-Kfardebian is home to different ski clubs.

== See also ==
- List of ski areas and resorts in Asia
- Asian Alpine Ski Championships-2000, 2008, 2009, 2016, 2017, 2022.
