= Deira (album) =

Studio album by Saint Levant
- Released: June 7, 2024
- Recorded: 2024
- Genre: Hip-hop; pop rap; contemporary R&B; Arabic pop; Maghrebi folk; raï; chaabi; Palestinian folk; world music
- Length: 20:15
- Label: SALXCO; UAM
- Producer: Marwan Abdelhamid; Khalil Cherradi; Abdellah Messous; Ratchopper; Mehdi Ryan; Blaise Batisse

Saint Levant chronology
From Gaza, with Love (2023)	Deira (2024)	Love Letters / رسائل حب (2025)

Singles from Deira
- 1. "Deira" Released: February 23, 2024; 2. "5am in Paris" Released: April 11, 2024; 3. "Galbi" Released: May 3, 2024

Deira (stylized in all caps; Arabic: ديرة) is the debut studio album by Palestinian rapper Saint Levant, released through SALXCO and Universal Arabic Music (UAM) on June 7, 2024. The album features guest appearances from other Palestinian and international artists, namely MC Abdul, Kehlani, Cheb Bilal, TIF and Sol Band, with additional backing vocals by Zeyne and Naïka.

The album pays homage to Saint Levant's diverse cultural background, blending contemporary music with traditional styles as well as mixing English-, French- and Arabic-language lyrics. Thematically, it revolves around the Palestinian right of return and the longing for the country's liberation, having been described as a "tribute" or "ode to Palestine". The title track and lead single, "Deira", performed in the chaabi musical style of Algiers, is dedicated to Saint Levant's family-owned hotel in Gaza, which went destroyed in an Israeli bombing in January 2024 during Israel's war on Gaza. The opening track, "On This Land", performed with the Gazan group Sol Band, incorporates parts of the Palestinian patriotic song and unofficial anthem "Mawtini", and explores the theme of martyrdom; its title references a poem by Mahmoud Darwish.

The album's release was preceded by three singles in February, April and May 2024, respectively, and was followed by a tour across Europe and North America between September 22 and December 15, 2024.

== Track listing ==
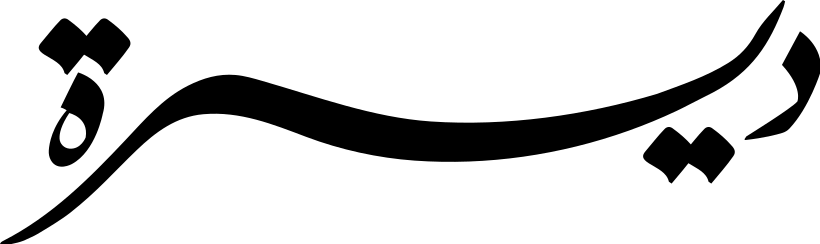
Promotional logo artwork for the album

Deira track listing
No.	Title	Writer(s)	Producer(s)	Length
1.	"On This Land" (featuring Sol Band)	Marwan Abdelhamid	Khalil Cherradi	2:14
2.	"Forgive Me" (featuring TIF)	Marwan Abdelhamid; Toufik Bouhraoua; Abdellah Messous; Blaise Batisse; Mounir Maarouf; Souhayl Guesmi; Senpaï Katchy	Khalil Cherradi; Abdellah Messous; Ratchopper; Blaise Batisse	2:51
3.	"Galbi"	Marwan Abdelhamid; Abdellah Messous; Victoria Richard; Moez Bouali	Abdellah Messous	2:23
4.	"5am in Paris"	Marwan Abdelhamid; Khalil Cherradi	Khalil Cherradi	2:09
5.	"Let Her Go" (featuring Cheb Bilal)	Marwan Abdelhamid; Bilal Mouffok; Khalil Cherradi; Mohamed Khafage	Khalil Cherradi	2:39
6.	"Allah Yihmeeki" (featuring Kehlani)	Marwan Abdelhamid; Khalil Cherradi; Victoria Richard; Moez Bouali; Ben Thompson; Victor Martinez; Elian Margieh	Marwan Abdelhamid; Khalil Cherradi	2:43
7.	"Comme c'est beau"	Marwan Abdelhamid; Abdelhakim Rouidi	Khalil Cherradi; Abdellah Messous	2:27
8.	"Deira" (featuring MC Abdul)	Marwan Abdelhamid; Khalil Cherradi	Khalil Cherradi	2:49
Total length:				20:15

== Music personnel ==
- Saint Levant – lead vocals (all tracks)
- Cheb Bilal – lead vocals (track 5)
- Sol Band – lead vocals (track 1)
- TIF – lead vocals (track 2)
- Bayou – backing vocals (track 6)
- Katara Studios Choir – backing vocals (track 1)
- Naïka – backing vocals (track 5)
- Zeyne – backing vocals (tracks 1, 6, 8)
- Abdelhakim Rouidi – guitar (tracks 7, 8)
- Ben Thomson – guitar (track 6)
- Daniel Malet – guitar (track 1)
- Domenico Lorenzo "Buddy" Caderni – bass (track 6), piano (track 7), keyboards (track 8)
- Hisham Dahud – percussions (track 1)
- Mehdi Ryan – percussions (track 8)
- Moez Bouali – violin (tracks 1, 3, 5, 6, 8)
- Nazim Bakour – guitar (tracks 1, 2, 5, 7), oud (track 1)
- Senpaï Katchy – guitar (track 2)
- Victor Martinez – guitar (track 6)
- Yasmeen Al-Mazeedi – violin (track 7)

== Charts ==
Weekly chart performance for Deira
Chart (2024)	Peak position
Belgian Albums (Ultratop Wallonia)	131
French Albums (SNEP)	84
Swiss Albums (Schweizer Hitparade)	35
