= Emile Riachi =

Pr. Emile Riachi
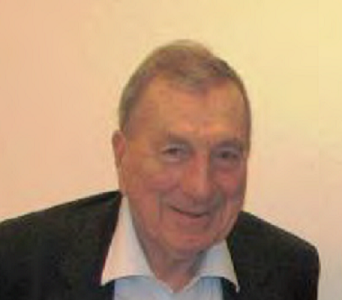
- Born: November 2, 1926
- Died: June 15, 2014 (aged 87)

Emile Riachi (November 2, 1926 – 15 June 2014) was a renowned orthopaedic surgeon in Lebanon.

== Biography ==
Riachi was born in Beirut, Lebanon, in 1926. He graduated from the "Faculté Francaise de Médecine" in Beirut in 1950 as MD and then moved to Chicago to specialize in Orthopaedic Surgery at Cook County Hospital with Professor Hampar Kelikian. Returning to Lebanon, Riachi founded the first service of Orthopaedic Surgery and Traumatology in the Middle-East in 1954, within Beirut's St George Hospital. He was also the founder and first President of the Lebanese Orthopaedic Association.

He was also an honorary member of the SOFCOT, the French Orthopaedic Association.

In 1960, Emile Riachi, founded the Lebanese Ski Federation and became its first President until 1996. Ski au Liban - histoire et evolution - Lebanese Ski Federation. Under his leadership, Lebanon has become a destination for high level ski champions. From 1962 until 1975 when the civil war in Lebanon erupted, the famous championships known as "Semaine Internationale de Ski au Liban" attracted the best champions from alpine countries.

He was also one of the pioneers who founded Faraya Mzaar Kfardebian, Lebanon's most famous ski resort.

== Representative scientific publications ==
- Riachi, E.; Phares, A. (1963). "An Unusual Deformity of the Medial Semilunar Cartilage" (PDF). Journal of Bone and Joint Surgery. 45-B: 146–147. doi:10.1302/0301-620X.45B1.146. Archived from the original (PDF) on 2020-04-12.
- Kelikian, E J (1957). "Restoration of quadriceps function in neglected tear of the patellar tendon". Surgery, Gynecology & Obstetrics. 104 (2): 200–4. PMID 13422134.
- Riachi (1964). "Hazards and Complications of Intra-Articular Injections in the Knee". Revue Médicale du Moyen-Orient. 21: 67–70. PMID 14133004.
- Riachi (1971). "Closed treatment of leg fractures by the 3 pin method". La Presse Médicale. 79 (24): 1126–7. PMID 5580544.
- Khalil, G E W (1980). "Benign chondroblastoma. A case report and review of the literature". Le Journal Médical Libanais. 31 (1): 3–14. PMID 16295323.

== Literary writings ==
- RIACHI, Emile (2007) Ma Vie Editions Tamyras ISBN 9953-0-0348-3
- RIACHI, Emile (2011) "L'Orthopédie à la portée de tous" Dar al Kotob

== See also ==
- Faraya Mzaar Kfardebian
- Skiing in Lebanon
