= Faqra =

Ski resort in Lebanon

- Location in Lebanon
- Location: Mount Lebanon
- Nearest city: Jounieh
- Coordinates: 33.9851°N 35.8109°E
- Vertical: 1,000 m (3,280 ft)
- Top elevation: 2,000 m (6,560 ft)
- Base elevation: 1,500 m (4,920 ft)
- Website: www.faqraclub.com

Faqra is a ski resort on the outskirts of the Kfardebian village in the Keserwan District in Mount Lebanon, 47 km (29 mi) from Beirut and 36 km (22 mi) from Jounieh.

The resort is located at an altitude ranging from 1500 m to 2000 m at the foot of Mount Sannine.

The resort is centered around Faqra Club, which was founded in 1974. The main hotel is the Auberge de Faqra. Another hotel is Terre Brune. From atop the tracks, the Mediterranean and Beirut are visible.

In addition to skiing, the resort offers other snow sports, such as snowboarding, luge and snowshoeing. With more than 7 km of trails, it offers snowboarders and skiers a variety of slopes, including a 240 m vertical drop.

The resort overlooks Qalaat Faqra, a Roman archeological site and one of the most important sites of the UNESCO-listed Nahr al-Kalb valley. Another attraction nearby is a 35 m-long limestone natural bridge.

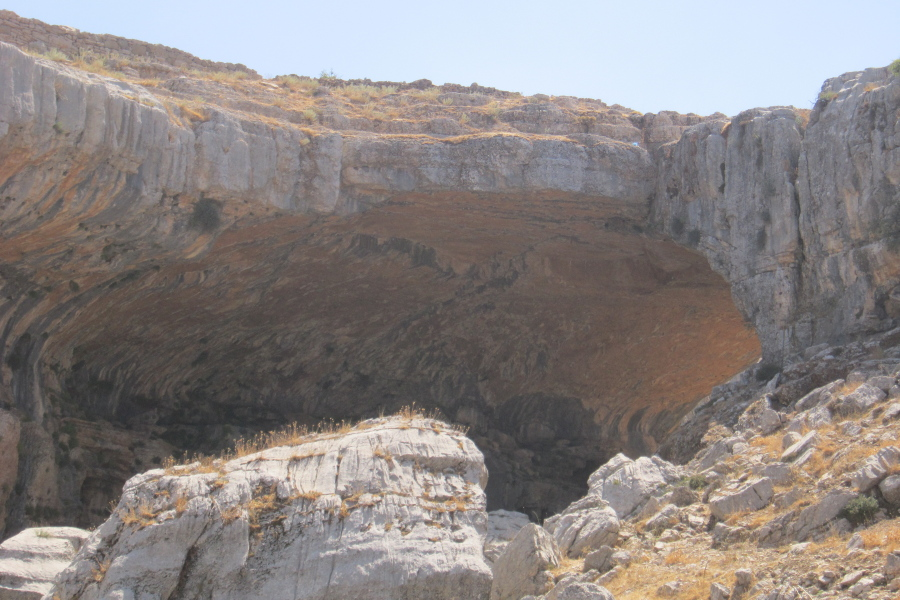
Faqra Views

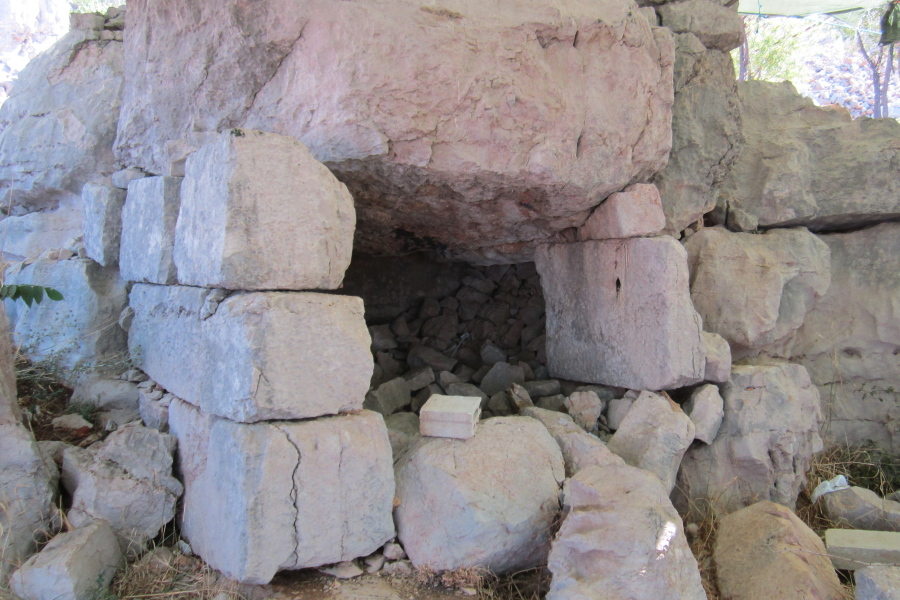
Faqra nawawis

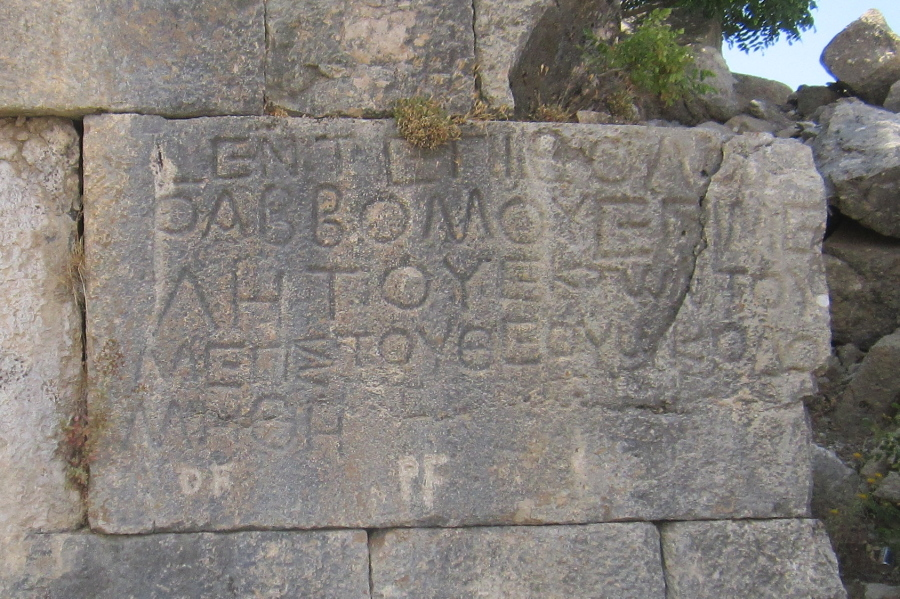
Faqra ruins
