= Tower of Qalaat Faqra =

Roman-period tower in Mount Lebanon

- برج قلعة فقرا (Arabic)
- The Tower of Claudius at Qalaat Faqra

- Location within Lebanon
- 34.001767°N 35.805064°E

History
- Founded: AD 43–44
- Built for: Sanctuary of Beelgalasos

Site notes
- Elevation: 1,500 metres (4,900 ft)
- Height: 10 metres (33 ft) surviving
- Architectural styles: Greco-Roman, Phoenician, Egyptianizing

The tower of Qalaat Faqra (Arabic: برج قلعة فقرا; also known as the Tower of Claudius, Altar-Tower of Faqra, Tower of Fakra) is a monumental Roman-period structure near the sanctuary of Qalaat Faqra, on the slopes of the Mount Lebanon, Lebanon. Inscriptions in Greek date the structure to 43–44 AD. It is the largest of four ancient monuments on the ridge above the Qalaat Faqra sanctuary.

The tower consists of a massive, near-cubic limestone socle measuring approximately 15.67 metres (51.4 ft) on each side, with a surviving height of roughly ten meters (33 ft). Its lost upper floor originally featured pilasters and central columns with proto-Aeolic capitals, supporting a Doric entablature, an Egyptian-style cavetto cornice, and a parapet adorned with stepped Phoenician merlons. Inscriptions on the building identify its funding from the treasury of the local deity Beelgalasos, under the provincial administration of the Syrian governor Gaius Cassius Longinus.

While early nineteenth-century European travelers often categorized the monument as a funerary tower-tomb, twentieth-century scholars ruled this out as there are no burial features, and the building has defensive drop-barriers and internal locking mechanisms instead. The tower is now interpreted as a multifunctional civic and religious structure that functioned as a sanctuary treasury (thesauros) and watchtower overlooking the high-altitude routes of the Keserwan region.

== Location and setting ==
The tower of Qalaat Faqra stands on an exposed limestone ridge at an elevation of approximately 1,500 metres (4,900 ft) above sea level in the Keserwan District of Mount Lebanon. It lies roughly twenty kilometers (12 mi) inland, as the crow flies, from the coast at the Bay of Jounieh.

The tower belongs to the wider site of Qalaat Faqra, a karst landscape divided into three sectors. The northern sector, set on the highest elevated point of the plateau, is dominated by the tower of Qalaat Faqra and three accompanying stone altars. The tower overlooks both the surrounding landscape and the routes by which the site was approached from the valleys. Jean-Paul Rey-Coquais noted the prominence of the tower on the approach to the site. The central sector located in a lower basin directly south of the ridge; it contains the Great Sanctuary of Zeus Beelgalasos, featuring a large colonnaded temenos enclosure surrounding a peripteral temple carved partly into the natural bedrock. The southern sector is on the lower slopes, with a complex that centers on the Small Temple dedicated to the Syrian goddess Atargatis. The latter temple was converted during the early fifth century AD into a three-nave Byzantine Christian basilica. The terrain around the site's northern sector is defined by heavily eroded gray limestone formations (lapiez).

== Historical context ==
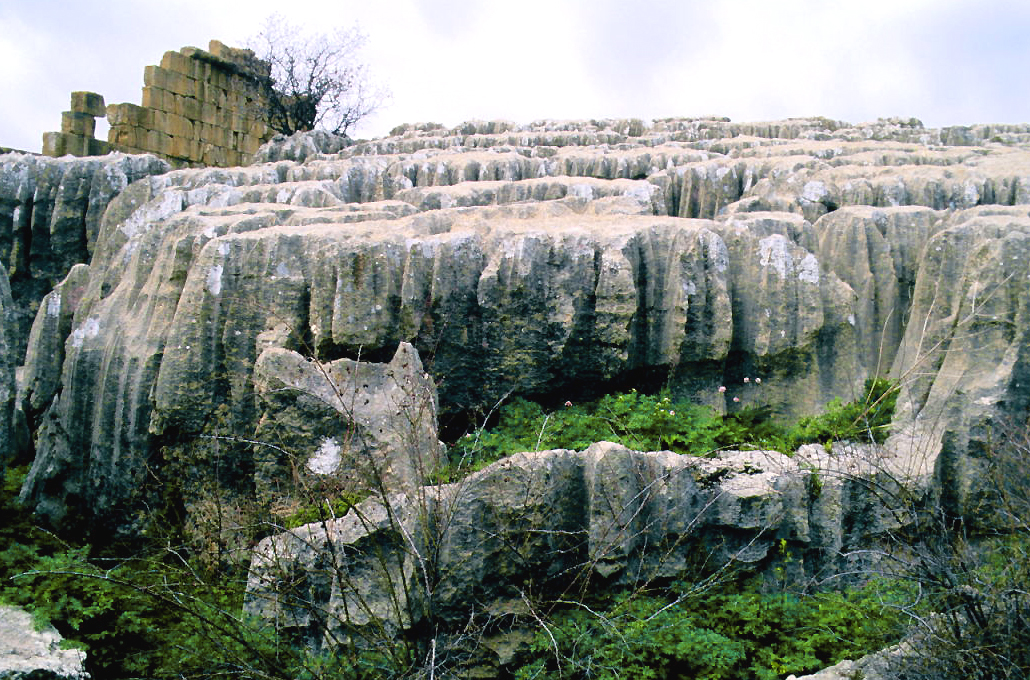
Karst formations around the temple of Faqra

According to Swiss archaeologist Paul Collart, the tower of Qalaat Faqra was built amid the reorganization of client kingdoms in the Roman Near East during the mid-first century AD. He posited that tensions between the Jewish client king Herod Agrippa and the Roman governor Marsus, set against the wider redistribution of client kingdoms in the region, left the sanctuary community at Qalaat Faqra exposed. Following the death of Agrippa I in 44 AD and the subsequent reorganization of Levantine client territories under direct Roman provincial authority, Gaius Cassius Longinus, legate of Syria, took charge of the region. Collart furhter notes that, because mountain sanctuaries in Mount Lebanon lacked direct city-state (polis) protection during administrative shifts between client kingdoms and provincial governors, local populations faced economic and political vulnerabilities. The scholar posited that dedicating a tower to Emperor Claudius and to Beelgalasos was an act of political diplomacy, and that by erecting a monument bearing official imperial dedications alongside local governors, the local community of Nebaa el-Leben placed the sanctuary's assets under direct imperial protection.

The French orientalist Jean-Paul Rey-Coquais proposed that Qalaat Faqra may originally have belonged to the Ituraean kingdom of northern Lebanon rather than lying within or immediately beside the domains of Agrippa I. He associated this possibility with the presence or political dominance of an Arab clan in the area. He further presents that Qalaat Faqra was incorporated into the Roman province of Syria following the death of the Ituraean ruler Sohem and Emperor Claudius’s annexation of his kingdom. He posits that the construction and dedication of the tower in AD 43–44 may have marked the community’s transfer to direct Roman rule and served as a public declaration of loyalty to Claudius as its new sovereign. Rey-Coquais further proposed that the area subsequently became part of Agrippa II’s domains when the ruler received territories in Lebanon in 53 AD. Rey-Coquais also connected this chronology with a separate dedication to Agrippa and Berenice at the site.

== Architecture and description ==
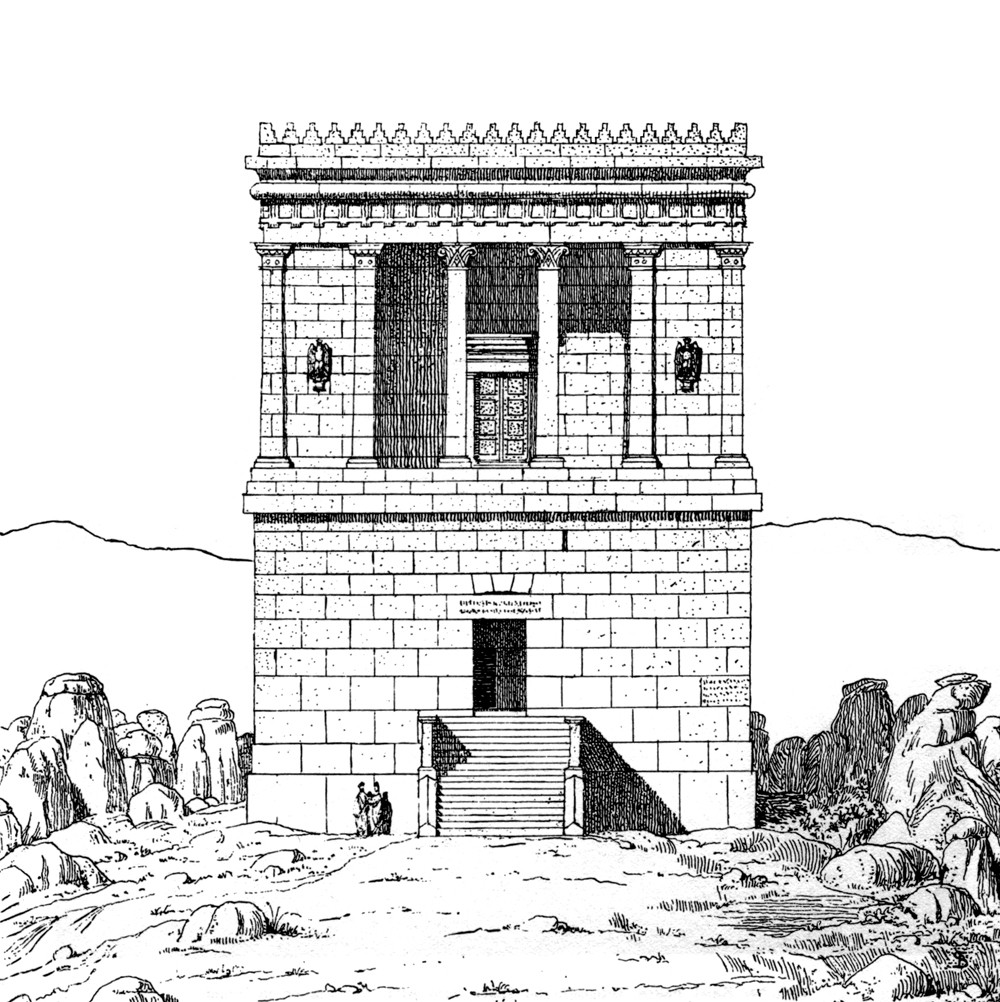
Schulz' reconstruction of the facade of the Faqra Tower

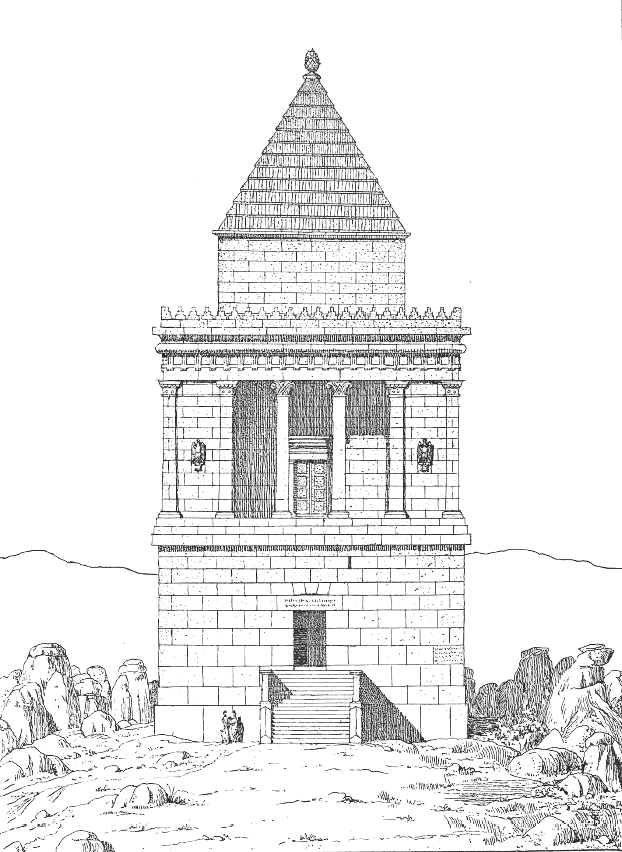
Alternative reconstruction with a pyramid

The tower of Qalaat Faqra is built from large, local limestone ashlar blocks fitted without mortar, using the tight joints typical of Roman-period Levantine monumental masonry. The remaining lower portion consists of a massive cubic socle measuring 15.67 meters (51.4 ft) on each side, which reaches a preserved height of approximately ten meters (33 ft).

Architectural reconstructions based on structural fragments scattered around the site indicate that the lost upper elevation was highly articulated. Above the solid lower socle, the main upper story had outer wall faces decorated with engaged pilasters framing two central freestanding columns. The columns were topped with proto-Aeolic capitals, an archaic Levantine style characterized by outward-curling volutes that predated classical Ionic forms. (Note: Proto-Aeolic capitals represent an ancient Iron Age Levantine architectural tradition that persisted in local stonecutting practices into the Roman period.) The superstructure supported a composite entablature comprising three distinct architectural traditions: a Doric frieze with alternating metopes and triglyphs, an Egyptianizing cavetto cornice above the frieze, and a parapet crowned with stepped Phoenician merlons (crenellations) along the roofline. An open loggia set into the eastern elevation aligned with the primary doorway. Rey-Coquais rejected the central arrangement of the loggia and doorway, arguing that the loggia was instead accessed laterally. Excavations in this area yielded fragments of a double molded statue base, which scholars suggest held two statues representing Emperor Claudius and the ancestral god Beelgalasos. Stair treads built into the masonry show that the roof once formed an accessible terrace.

Nineteenth-century travelers and early architectural historians, including Daniel Krencker and Willy Zschietzschmann, proposed that the monument was originally topped by a steep stone pyramid, drawing stylistic comparisons to nearby tower-tombs such as the Monument at Hermel in Lebanon, or the Tomb of Suweis at Homs, Syria. However, the examination of collapsed masonry revealed no pyramid capping stones or sloped corner blocks. Scholars like Collart and Bargfeldt hold that the tower was topped by a flat roof terrace, enclosed by the stepped stone merlons found on site.

=== Interior layout and secure chambers ===
Entry to the tower was controlled through two doorways. A primary one at mid-height on the eastern face, about three meters (9.8 ft) up, reached by roughly eighteen external steps, and a smaller secondary portal near the base of the southeastern corner giving direct access to the internal stair corridors. The internal layout consists of a narrow, vaulted perimeter corridor system that winds around a solid rectangular core of masonry. Movement through the corridors was systematically restricted by defensive features, including vertical grooves cut into the stone walls designed to hold drop-down stone or timber security barriers (herses), heavy iron-reinforced door sockets, and narrow turnings. The elevated main doorway opened into an antechamber that led directly to a windowless inner rectangular vault set within the center of the structure, which could be locked off from the exterior corridor using heavy metal grilles or gates.

=== Epigraphy and dedications ===
The tower preserves two inscriptions in Greek carved directly into its limestone ashlar blocks. Carved across the lintel stone spanning the primary elevated doorway on the eastern facade, the text dedicates the monument to the Emperor Claudius (referred to under his full imperial titles) and to the local ancestral deity Beelgalasos. It names Gaius Cassius Longinus, the governor of Syria. (Note: Paul Mouterde interpreted the term "Πηγαγαλάξιοι" as an ethnic/demonym for Nebaa el-Leben, a toponym in Faqra. Paul Collart picked up on this interpretation in his monograph on the Tower of Claudius.)

Line	Main doorway inscription	Translation (Note: Reconstructed text is enclosed in [square brackets], and text enclosed in (round brackets) denotes abbreviation in the text or inferred from the context that were expanded or resolved by scholars..)
(1)	Αὐτοκράτορι Τιβερίωι Κλαυδίωι Καίσαρι	To the emperor Tiberius Claudius Caesar
(2)	Σεβαστῶι και θ[εῶι] πατ[ρώι Βε]ελγαλασωι ἐπὶ Γαίου Κα…	Augustus and the ancestral god Beelgalasos, under Gaius Ca(ssius) ...

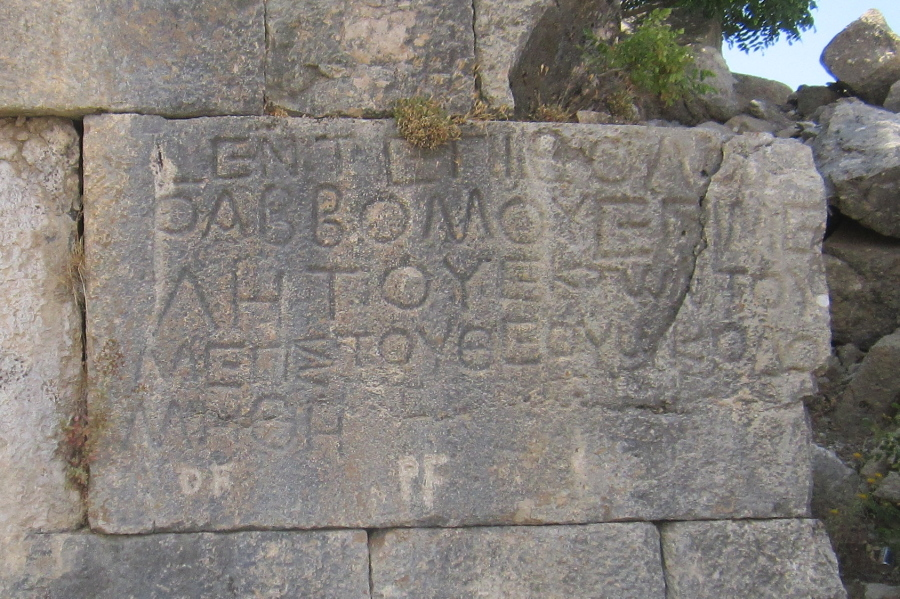
Inscription at the side of the main entrance

Positioned at eye level on a corner ashlar block at the northeastern edge of the lower socle, this second inscription is intact and records the date of construction and the official who oversaw it. It records that construction was completed in year 355 of the Seleucid era, corresponding to 43–44 AD. The text notes that the project was executed under the direct oversight of a local magistrate named Tholos, son of Rabbomus, and was paid for using dedicated funds drawn directly from the sacred treasury of the local god.

Line	Main doorway inscription	Translation
(1)	L ENT ἐπὶ Θολου	In 355, under Tholos,
(2)	Ραββομου ἐπιμε-	son of Rabbomus, the pres-
(3)	λητοῦ ἐκ τῶν τοῦ	ident, at the
(4)	μεγίστου θεοῦ ώκοδο-	Great God's expenses
(5)	μήθη	this was built

== Associated monuments ==
The northern ridge occupied by the tower of Qalaat Faqra contains three further ancient structures close to the tower.

=== Great Altar ===
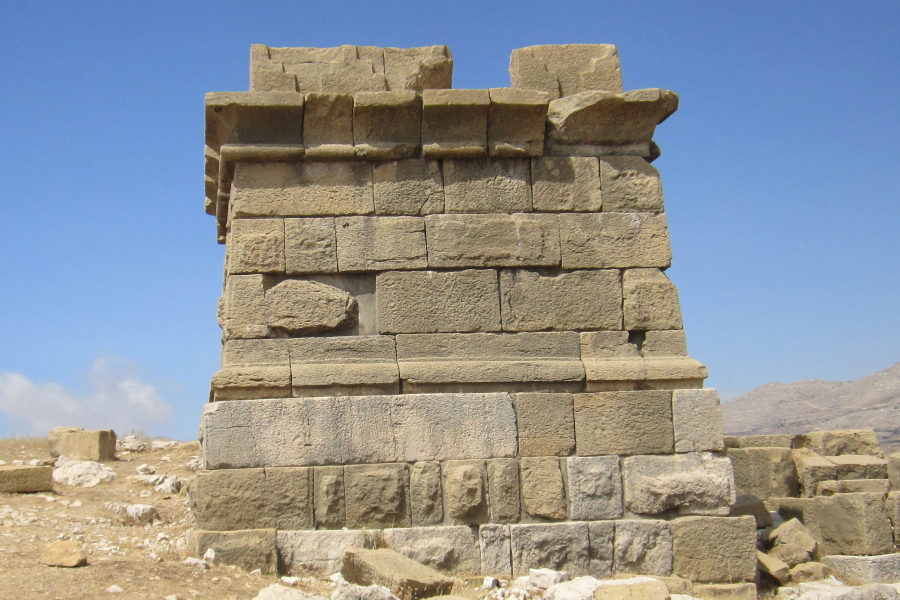
The Great Altar of Faqra

Situated approximately 50 meters (160 feet) directly east of the tower, the Great Altar is a monumental stone tower-altar standing roughly six meters (20 ft) high on a square base measuring 5.3 by 5.3 metres (17 ft × 17 ft). The altar is built of three courses of dressed limestone; its upper section carries a relief of pyramidal stepped crenellations, and its low perimeter wall bears a relief of a bull's head (bucranium). The sacrificial platform at the top was accessible via portable ladders inserted through small breaks in the stone parapet, a physical constraint that restricted sacrifices on the platform to smaller animals such as sheep, goats, or birds. Architectural measurements conducted by the Lebanese archaeologist Haroutune Kalayan indicated that the tower of Qalaat Faqra and the Great Altar were aligned on the same axis. From the altar’s upper platform, the loggia and the statues displayed within it would have been clearly visible. Rey-Coquais distinguished the tower from the altar standing before it. He interpreted the tower as a cult building displaying divine and imperial statues, while the separate Great Altar served as the place of sacrifice. He compared the tower-and-altar arrangement with the sanctuary at Amrit, where a tower-like cult structure containing a divine image faced a separate altar. He also mentioned the Nereid Monument at Xanthos as a more distant architectural parallel.

=== Colonnaded monument ===
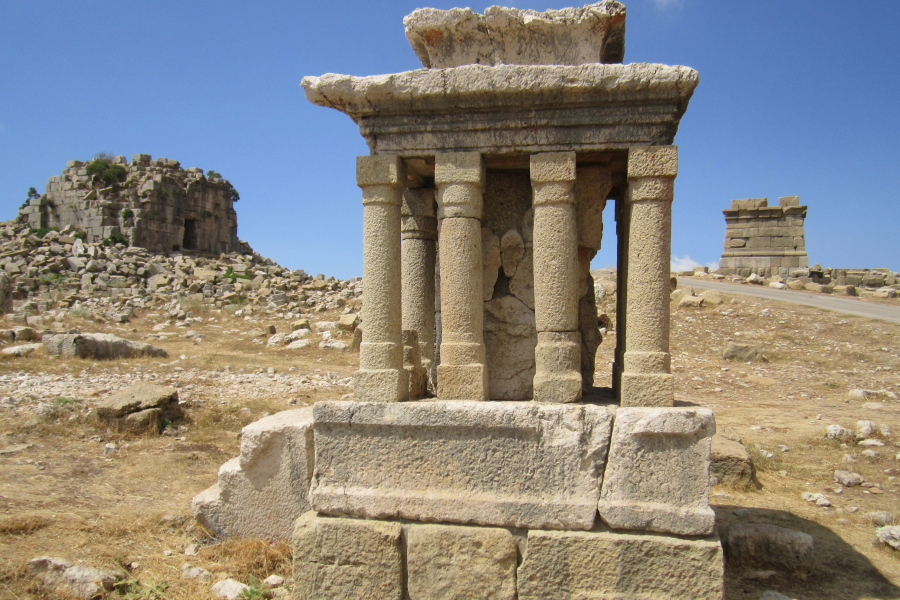
The colonnaded monument after restoration

Standing at a short distance south of the main tower, this smaller monument (variously referred to as the Small Altar or édicule à colonnettes) stands 3.2 metres (10 ft) high. Restored by the French mandatory antiquities service between 1943 and 1945, the monument consists of a square masonry platform supporting a four-column peristyle surrounding a solid internal stone core, all crowned by a double Egyptianizing cavetto cornice. Similar architectural votive structures have been documented at other contemporary Near Eastern sanctuary sites, including Machnaqa, Hosn Niha, Qsarnaba, and Palmyra. Jona Lendering interprets the monument as a shrine rather than an altar, on the basis of its interior niche.

=== Destroyed altar ===
Located directly between the Great Altar and the colonnaded monument, the remains of a fourth altar survive today as an unrestored mound of fallen ashlar blocks and broken molded cornices. Additional unexcavated features recorded on the northern ridge include a circular water cistern cut into the karst bedrock, stone wall footings extending south toward the main temple enclosure, and paved flagstone foundations connecting the altars to the eastern access steps of the main tower.

== Research history and scholarly interpretations ==
The monuments at Qalaat Faqra were recorded by several eighteenth- and nineteenth-century travellers, including François de Pagès, who visited the site in 1770–1771 and copied the dated inscription on the tower’s southeastern corner. The German classicist Otto Puchstein later documented the site and copied its inscriptions; this work was incorporated into Daniel Krencker and Willy Zschietzschmann’s Römische Tempel in Syrien, published in 1938. Haroutune Kalayan of Lebanon’s Directorate General of Antiquities subsequently conducted excavations and restoration work at the nearby sanctuary of Qalaat Faqra and discovered additional inscriptions. His examination of the tower identified an elongated base, in the upper loggia, probably intended to support two statues. His findings also indicated that the loggia was entered from the side rather than through the central doorway shown in earlier reconstructions.

In 1939, the French archaeologist and epigraphist René Mouterde had interpreted the damaged text as naming the dedicating community:Greek: Πηγηγαλάξιοι, romanized: Pègègalaxioi. Mouterde understood this as an ethnic or community name meaning approximately "the people of the Source of Milk". He connected it with the nearby locality of Nebaa el-Leben, literally the “Spring of Milk,” whose source is close to Qalaat Faqra. This interpretation required alterations to letters recorded by earlier copyists like Otto Puchstein. Following the discovery of two independent dedications naming Zeus Beelgalasos or Baelgalasos, Rey-Coquais restored the passage as a joint dedication to Emperor Claudius and the ancestral god Beelgalasos. The supposed reference to a community associated with Nebaa el-Leben was therefore rejected as a misreading of the deity’s name.

During the nineteenth and early twentieth centuries, European explorers and antiquarians, including Ernest Renan, Léon de Laborde, J. L. Porter, and Edward Robinson, offered various theories regarding the original function of the tower. Because its massive square profile and mixed architectural decoration resemble regional tower-tombs (such as those found in Palmyra or Hermel), early documentation categorized the site as a funereal monument. Mid-twentieth-century archaeologists Paul Collart and Ernest Will rejected the funerary hypothesis based on structural and epigraphic evidence including the absence of funerary infrastructure. In his analysis, Will argued for a cultic destination over a sepulchral function, while Collart's detailed monograph noted the complete absence of burial elements. Collart also relied on epigraphic evidence, arguing that Greek dedications to a living emperor (Claudius) and to a god (Beelgalasos) fit the pattern of civic, honorific, or religious monuments, not private tombs. Collart also based his interpretation on the building's restricted interior, including narrow passages, barriers and a secure central chamber. He proposed that the latter was used as a sanctuary treasury (thesauros) for objects belonging to Beelgalasos. According to Rey-Coquais, the tower’s alignment with the Great Altar, together with the probable statue base in its upper loggia, supports its interpretation as a cult building, specifically as a monument of the imperial cult, in which the emperor and the local ancestral deity were jointly honored.

== Conservation status ==
Clearance and consolidation work began in 1944 by the Lebanese Directorate General of Antiquities, overseen by archaeologists Paul Collart and Henri Seyrig.

Restoration efforts continued intermittently until 1975, stabilizing the lower socle, reconstructing elements of the colonnaded monument, and documenting the surrounding epigraphic corpus.

== See also ==
- Museiliha inscription – First-century AD inscribed boundary marker
- Qalaat Faqra – Archaeological site in Lebanon
- Roman Phoenicia – Period in the history of Lebanon from 64 BCE to the 7th century
- Roman temple of Bziza – Cultural heritage building in Bziza, Lebanon
- Sanctuary of Yanouh – Ancient sanctuary in Lebanon
