= Hampar Kelikian =

Armenian American orthopedic surgeon

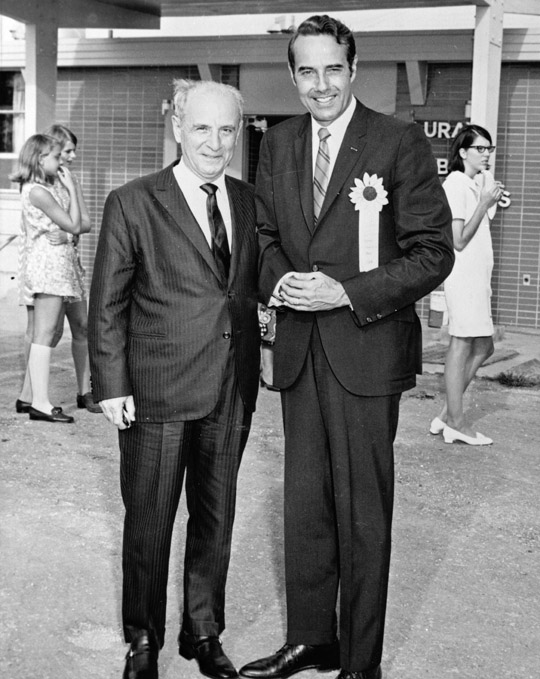
- Kelikian and Bob Dole posing for a picture
- Born: January 17, 1899; Hadjin, Ottoman Empire
- Died: July 24, 1983 (aged 84); Chicago, Illinois, United States
- Occupation: Orthopedic Surgeon

Hampar Kelikian (Armenian: Համբար Քելիքեան; January 17, 1899 – July 24, 1983) was an Armenian American orthopedic surgeon. A pioneer in the restoration of damaged limbs, he was instrumental in treating U.S. Senator Bob Dole. When Dole returned from World War II with injuries that left his right arm frozen and about to be amputated, Kelikian fixed the shattered shoulder and allowed Dole to regain some use of his arm.

== Biography ==
Kelikian was from Hadjin in the Ottoman Empire. Born Hamparzoum Keklikian, he came to the United States in 1920 to escape the Armenian genocide, an event in which his three sisters had been killed. He was inspired to become a surgeon by his uncle, who worked as a physician in the Ottoman army. After emigrating to Chicago in 1920 under the sponsorship of Rev. Antranig A. Bedikian, Kelikian worked as a waiter at the University of Chicago. At the University of Chicago, he received a scholarship from President Harry Pratt Judson to study there and at Rush Medical College. He finished an internship at Cook County Hospital, and in 1929, he became an assistant to Philip Kreuscher, who had been in practice with the bone specialist John Murphy.

During World War II, Kelikian served as chief orthopedic surgeon and lieutenant colonel at the 297th General Hospital. Bob Dole was one of his many patients, and Kelikian refused to accept any fees from the young veteran, since his brother Siragan had been killed in Italy in 1943. In total, Kelikian performed seven operations between 1947 and 1953 to restore the use of Dole's arm by transplanting leg bone and muscle to the right shoulder and hand. He saved the left arm of a young Victor A. Lundy, who would become a leading architect of the Sarasota Modern school; Kelikian never discharged his patient, who would serve as his medical artist. Upon his return to Chicago, he joined the staff of Wesley Hospital and Northwestern Medical School.

Kelikian later became an emeritus associate professor of orthopedic surgery, performing ten operations a week when he was 80. Kelikian wrote three classic monographs on hand, ankle, and foot surgery, as well as a book on Armenian poetry. He also specialized in congenital deformities, particularly gigantism and phocomelia due to thalidomide. He never charged Armenians for treatment.

Kelikian had a son Armen, also a surgeon, and two daughters, Alice and Virginia, by his wife Ovsanna (née Kupelian). He died on Sunday July 24, 1983, at Northwestern Memorial Hospital in Chicago. He was 84.

== Achievements ==
While he was working for the United States Army, his services were recognized by President Harry Truman, who gave him a citation and a medal. He also received a citation from the Queen while working as a consulting orthopedic surgeon at the Ronkswood General Hospital in Worcester. In 1969, he was appointed to President Nixon’s Task Force for the Disabled. In 1966, he was invited to visit Lebanon by Professor Emile Riachi, his former resident, and was awarded the Order of the National Cedars of Lebanon by President Charles Helou.
