= Sol Band =

Palestinian folk-pop band

Sol Band فرقة صول
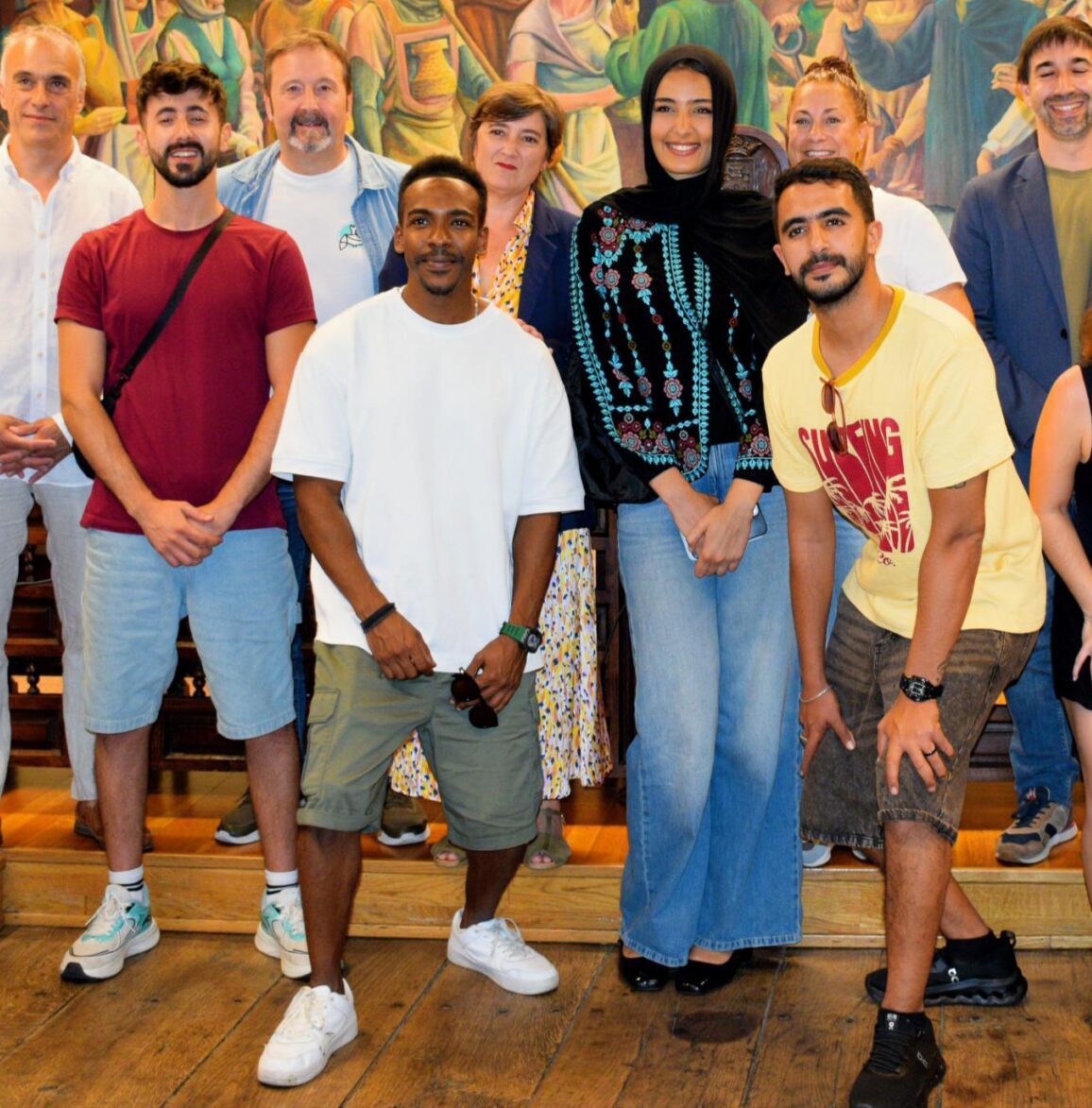
- Four members of the band in September 2025 (front row, L–R): Nasrallah, Fadel, Shamaly and Anbar

Background information
- Origin: Gaza Strip, Palestine
- Genres: Arab folk; Arab pop; pop
- Years active: 2012–present
- Members: Rahaf Shamaly; Hamada Nasrallah; Fares Anbar; Said Fadel; Abood Abuqassim; Ahmed Haddad
- Past members: Mohammed Shoman; Majd Antar; Reem Anbar
- Website: solbandgaza.com

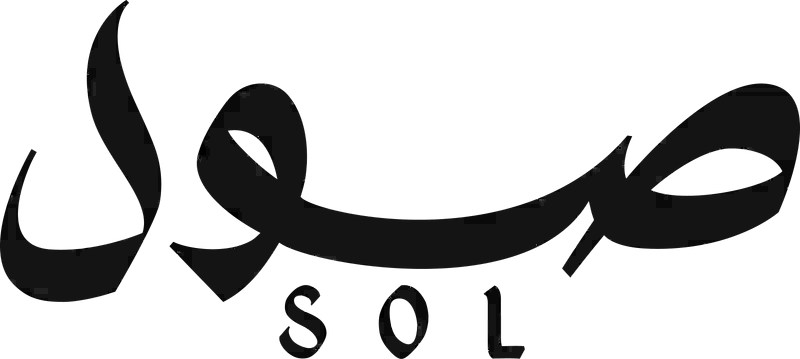
The group's logo since September 2025

Sol Band (Arabic: فرقة صول, romanized: Firqat Ṣūl), sometimes known as just Sol, is a Palestinian band from the Gaza Strip, established in 2012. They are best known for their 2022 song "Raweq wa Haddy".

== History ==
Sol Band (named after the musical note but also reminiscent of the Arabic word جول, jawl/jōl, 'roaming, wandering') was founded in late 2012, in the wake of the Israeli offensive on Gaza that November, by a group of youths who had met in 2011. Shortly after, they started sharing their music on YouTube and Facebook. In 2016, the band opened the "Sayed Darwish Music School" (named after the Egyptian singer) in Gaza City. The students included Nana Ashour, who became known as "Gaza's first girl drummer", and singer Rafah Shamaly, who joined the band in 2018.

In 2019, they collaborated with the Falastini TV channel to record a number of Arab folk songs. At the end of the year, most of the band relocated to Istanbul, Turkey. Five members returned to Gaza in August 2023 to record an album, but the outbreak of the Gaza war halted their plans until they were evacuated to Qatar in April 2024; vocalist Hamada Nasrallah denounced an IDF soldier for stealing a guitar he had been gifted by his late father, who was killed by Israel in the 2014 Gaza war. The following June, Sol Band appeared on a track from Saint Levant's debut album Deira.

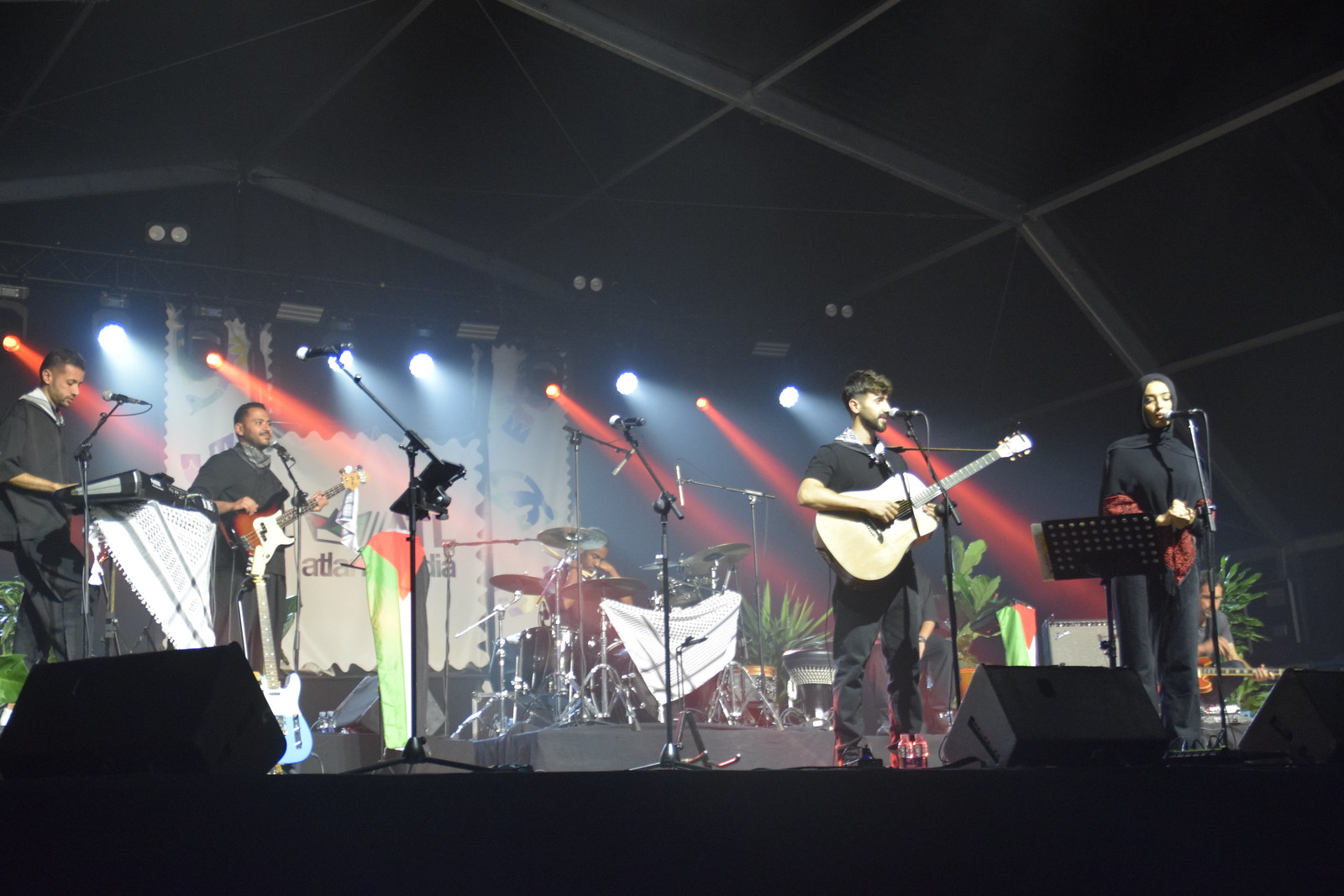
The band performing in Errenteria, Basque Country, in 2025

The group has performed at local and international events, including at the French Institute (Gaza, 2015; Jerusalem, 2020), the Palestine International Festival (2018), the Palestine Music Expo (Ramallah, 2019), the EU-sponsored Rooftop Festival (Palestine, 2018), the Arabesques Festival (Montpellier, 2021), the Copacobana Festival (Ghent, 2021), the Jerash Festival (Jordan, 2023), and the Maite Zaitut Festival (Basque Country, 2025). In June 2025, they played in Bilbao (Basque Country, Spain) at the closing ceremony of a protest organized by Gure Esku for the right of self-determination of the Basque people, as well as "in solidarity with other peoples in their struggle for liberation". They have since taken part in other events in the Basque Country, including the local university, as well as elsewhere in Spain (Barcelona), and they toured Europe and the Middle East between late 2025 and early 2026.

== Artistry ==
Sol Band's repertoire includes patriotic songs about resistance and livelihood in Palestine, as well as music from historic Arab artists like Umm Kulthum, Mohamed Abdel Wahab, Wadih El Safi and Fairuz.

Founding member Fares Anbar also founded "Fares Anbar Music House", a physical and online school of percussion, songwriting and music theory.

== Reception ==
Sol Band gained a significant following since its establishment, but some conservative figures in Palestinian society have been critical of a mixed-gender band performing in public and its members reported having faced severe restrictions by the Hamas administration of the Gaza Strip. However, support for them grew among Palestinians in Gaza during the genocide, as their music would help children cope with their situation.

== Band members ==
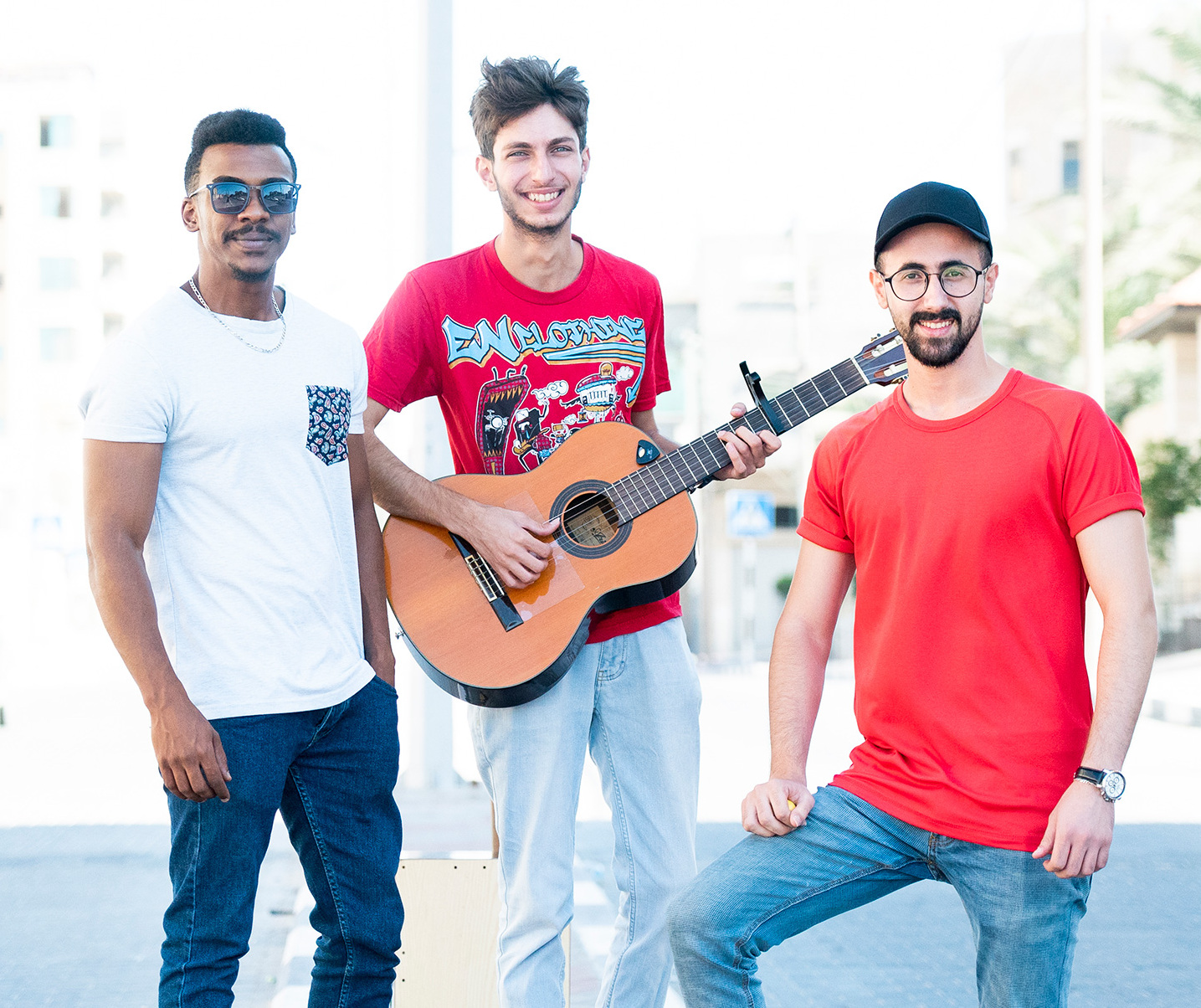
Three members of the band in 2019; left to right: Said Fadel, Mohammed Shoman and Hamada Nasrallah

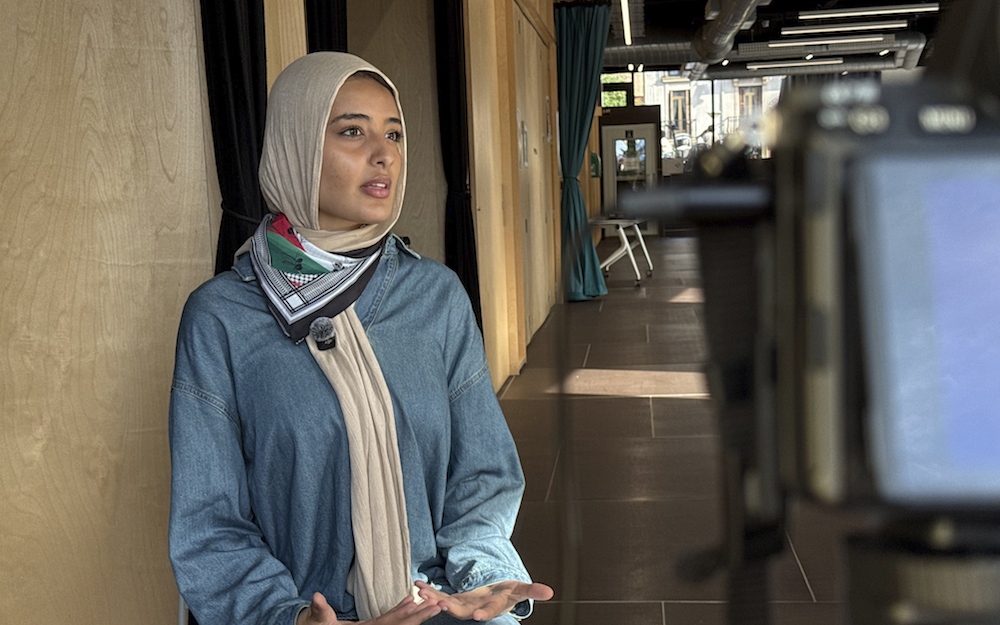
Rahaf Shamaly in September 2025

=== Current members ===
- Rahaf Shamaly – vocals
- Hamada Nasrallah – vocals
- Fares Anbar – percussions
- Said Fadel – percussions, keyboards, oud
- Abdelkader "Abood" Abuqassim – keyboards
- Ahmed Haddad – guitar
- Samir Alborno – sound engineer

=== Past members ===
- Mohammed Shoman – guitar, bass
- Majd Antar – drums
- Reem Anbar – oud

== Discography ==
=== Albums and EPs ===
- Sol Band (فرقة صول) – EP, 2022

=== Singles ===
- "Rafei Rasi" (رافع راسي) – 2018
- "Khaleek" (خليك) – 2019
- "Alooli" (قالولي) – 2019
- "Ghazza al Helwa" (غزة الحلوة) – 2019
- "Wein al Malayeen" (وين الملايين) – 2019
- "Zahrat al-Mada'en" (زهرة المدائن) – 2019
- "Wein a Ramallah" (وين ع رام الله) – 2020
- "Shaddu al-Himma" (شدوا الهمة) – 2020
- "Muntasib al-Qama" (منتصب القامة) – 2020
- "Laji Sammuni Laji" (لاجئ سموني لاجئ) – 2020
- "Nehna Mish Irhabiyeen" (نحنا مش إرهابيين) – 2020
- "Ana Betnaffas Horriyi" (أنا بتنفس حرية) – 2020
- "Ounadikom" (أناديكم) – 2020
- "Ashiq min Filastin (A Lover from Palestine)" (عاشق من فلسطين) – 2021
- "Dal'ouna" (دلعونا) – 2021
- "3aros al Falasteniya" (عروس الفلسطينية) – 2022
- "Hikayat Madina" (حكاية مدينة) – 2022
- "Raweq wa Haddy" (روِق وهدي) – 2022
- "Shili" (شيلي) – 2023
- "Ala Mad al Shoof" (على مد الشوف) – 2023
- "Eftah Aza Yalsan" (افتح عزا يا لسان) – 2023
- "Ma Hal Helalek Ghazzetna" (ما هل هلالك غزتنا) – 2024
- "My Children Are Birds in Heaven" (أولادي عصافير في الجنة) – 2024
- "Let's Build" (يلا بيني) – 2024
- "Ma Dal Haki" (ما ضل حكي) – 2024
- "Palestinians" (فلسطينية) – 2024
- "Metghreb" (متغرب) – 2024
- "Open Mourning (Eftah Aza)" (افتح عزا) – 2025
- "Teshtaaq" (تشتاق) – 2025
