= Qalaat Faqra =

Archaeological site in Lebanon

The Ruins of Faqra - Kfardebian
- The Tower of Claudius (part of the Roman and Byzantine ruins of Faqra) located in Kfardebian, Keserwan District, Lebanon

- location in Lebanon
- 34.001667°N 35.805°E

History
- Built: first-second centuries
- Built by: Romans
- Abandoned: fourth century

Site notes
- Condition: greatly destroyed
- Public access: yes
- (also there it is a 5th century Byzantine basilica)

The Ruins of Faqra - Kfardebian is an archaeological site in Kfardebian, Lebanon, with Roman and Byzantine ruins. Located near the Faqra ski resort on the slopes of Mount Sannine at an altitude of 1500 m (and exactly half-way between Berytus and Heliopolis, the two main Roman cities in Roman Phoenicia), it is one of the most important sites of the UNESCO-listed valley of Nahr al-Kalb (the classical "Lycus river").

== Data ==
The ruins are the most extensive Roman archeological site in Mount Lebanon and consists of columns, altars tombs and temples. They are divided into three sectors: that of the Tower of Claudius and the monumental altars, on the hill to the north; that of the Small Temple, to the south and below, towards the stream of Nabaa el-Laban; and that of the Great Sanctuary, between the first two.

The remains of an ancient settlement (Roman and perhaps proto-Byzantine) are visible near the tower and between the small temple and the large sanctuary. The little Roman settlement was probably made mainly by Roman veterans of the two legions settled by Augustus in Berytus (the fifth Macedonian and the third Gallic). The area of Faqra was located within the Roman district of Berytus: it was linked to the tentative of Romanization of the area around Berytus, that was done by the Romans in the first and second centuries in order to strengthen their Roman Empire in the eastern shores of the Mediterranean Sea.

Faqra - or, to use its full name: Qalaat Faqra, "Castle Faqra" - is situated along one of the roads from the coast to Baalbek, high up the western slopes of the Lebanon range. On a hill in a landscape full of bizarre rocks, there are four altars, one of them rebuilt during the reign of the emperor Claudius and therefore named "tower of Claudius". You can also find a "large altar", a nicely restored "small altar", and the remains of a "destroyed altar". Livius

A bit lower on a slope, to the south of actual Faqra, are the remains of two ancient temples: the largest of these is dedicated to Adonis and the other one to Atargatis, the "Syrian goddess". This Sanctuary can be dated to the second half of the first century, under emperor Claudius.

In Late Antiquity, the last-mentioned shrine was partly dismantled, and a Byzantine Basilica was built next to it.

Roman Faqra includes the famous Tower of Claudius with its Greek & Latin inscriptions that state that the building, which at one time was topped with a pyramid-shaped roof like Kamouh el Hermel, was renovated by the Roman emperor Claudius in honor of Adonis in CE 43-44. The tower has a 16m square base.

The site also includes a temple to Zeus Beelgalasos, a sanctuary of Atargatis dedicated to Agrippa II and his sister Berenice, and two altars, built in 44 A.D.

According to some archaeologists, like Yassmine and Alioquot, the two most important archaeological areas of Qalaat Faqra are the "Tower of Claudius" and the "Great Sanctuary":

=== The Claudius Tower ===
It rests on a cubic plinth of 15.67 m on each side with two doorways: halfway up, perpendicular to the eastern side of the Claudius tower, an external staircase of eighteen steps leads to the main door, while another, smaller door is at ground level in the southeast corner. Above the plinth, a few blocks belonging to the upper parts of the building allow its elevation to be restored. On the upper course of the plinth rest two steps, where stands the floor decorated with pilasters topped with capitals with brackets. The pilasters support a Doric entablature, crowned by a cornice adorned with a torus and an Egyptian throat. A loggia opens onto the eastern facade, directly above the main entrance. A system of narrow corridors and sideways spiral staircases allows circulation inside the building and ends in a small rectangular room in the central core of the matched masonry block.

=== The Great Sanctuary ===
The sanctuary is nestled in the dolomitic limestone formations, between the tower sector to the north and that of the small temple to the south. Its peribolus wall delimits an enclosure approximately 75 m long and 35 m wide, with the long sides to the north and south.

Ruins of the "Great Sanctuary"

Towards the west, it only continues for about 30m to the north and 15m to the south, before hitting the rocks. In the north, these have been roughly cut to give an approximately regular shape to the temenos. To the west and south, however, they are in the rough, so the temple clings to the rock face. To the east, the facade of the sanctuary is adorned with engaged pilasters and bordered by a decastyle portico about 6 m deep. This portico was recently restored. Clearing the area east of the enclosure revealed a limestone altar-tower measuring approximately 4.30 m by 4.10 m, devoid of moldings at the base and crowned with an Egyptian gorge.

A large door fitted in the middle of the facade of the peribola gives access to the Sanctuary. The interior space of the temenos is divided into two parts: a paved courtyard, roughly square and bordered by Tuscan porticos on three sides, precedes the upper terrace where the temple rises, beyond a flight of 'staircase covering the entire width of the sanctuary. The remains of a monumental sandstone and limestone altar are preserved in the courtyard, slightly offset to the south from the median axis of the temple.

The temple is aligned with the median axis of the peribolus. It rests on a solid foundation and not on a real podium. It was a hexastyle prostyle temple of the Corinthian order, about 40 m. long and 18 m. wide, with a pronaos and a long cella at the bottom of which rose the platform of an adyton. The walls of the building are built in double apparatus, mainly with blocks cut in the yellow ocher sandstone, while the prostyle consists of blocks of gray limestone.

Julie Yasmine date the construction of the Sanctuary in the middle of the 1st century, under Claudius. The attribution of the Sanctuary to the Heliopolitan Jupiter is admitted also by other archaeologists, like D. Krencker and W. Zschietzschmann.

== See also ==
- Roman Phoenicia
- Augustus Pagus
- Hosn Niha
- Heliopolis
- Berytus
- 1st century in Lebanon
- 2nd century in Lebanon

== Bibliography ==
- Aliquot, Julien. LA VIE RELIGIEUSE AU LIBAN SOUS L'EMPIRE ROMAIN Chapter 3: Villages et Sanctuaries (p. 71-126). Institut français du Proche-Orient. Beirut, 2009 ()
- Mommsen, Theodore. The Provinces of the Roman Empire from Caesar to Diocletian. Press Holdings International. New York, 2004. ISBN 9781410211675
- Nordiguian, L. Temples de l’époque romaine au Liban. Beyrouth, 2005
- Krencker D. and W. Zschietzschmann. Römische Tempel in Syrien. De Gruiter ed. Berlin, 1938
- Taylor, George. "The Roman Temples of Lebanon". Dar el Mashreq Publishers. Beyrut, 1971
- Yasmine, J. Remaniement de temples d’époque romaine; les cas de Niha et de Faqra. Apport de la métrologie. In BAAL 9, 2007, Beyrouth.
