= Naïka =

American and French-Haitian singer-songwriter (born 1995)

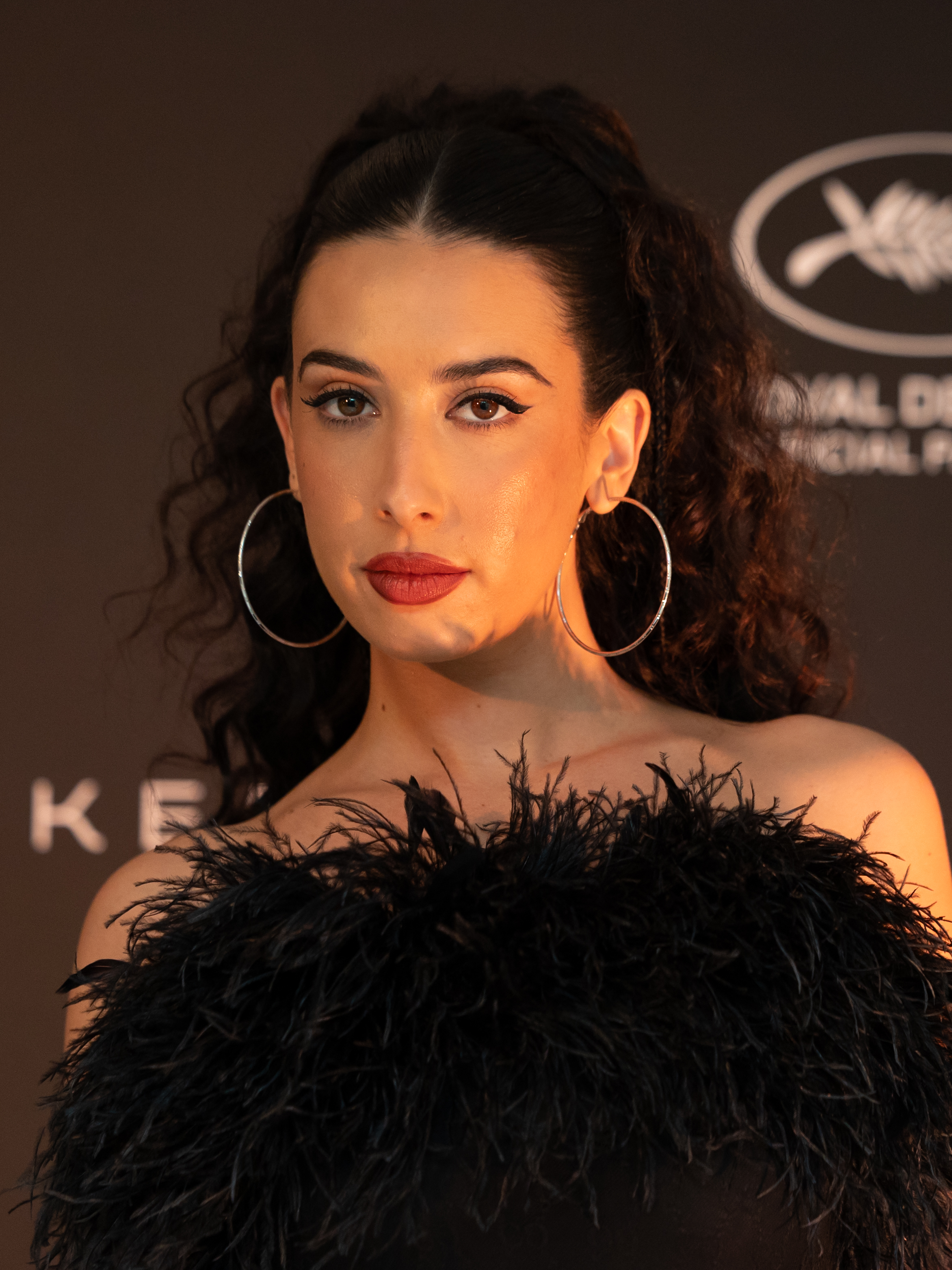
- Naïka at the 2026 Cannes Film Festival

Background information
- Born: Victoria Naika Richard (Note: Sometimes credited as Victoria Naicka Richard.); March 2, 1995 (age 31); Miami, Florida, U.S.
- Origin: Los Angeles, California, U.S.
- Genres: Pop; neo soul; contemporary R&B; world music; rasin
- Occupations: Singer; songwriter
- Instrument: Vocals
- Years active: 2016–present
- Labels: Capitol; Universal; AWAL
- Partner: Saint Levant (2023–2025)
- Website: www.naikaofficial.com

Victoria Naika Richard (born March 2, 1995) known professionally as Naïka, is an American and French-Haitian singer-songwriter.

== Early life and education ==
Naïka was born in Miami to a Haitian mother of Palestinian, Syrian and Lebanese origin and a French father who was raised in Madagascar. She and her mother traveled with him as he moved for work. As a child, Naïka lived in various countries and regions, namely Guadeloupe, Vanuatu, Nairobi, Paris, and South Africa, before moving back to Miami when she was 16. She developed her musical interests at an early age, attending tamure classes during her time in Vanuatu and receiving two years of classical piano training in South Africa.

In 2015, Naïka placed second in the BMI John Lennon Foundation Scholarship competition. She studied Performance as her major at Berklee College of Music in Boston, and was selected during her first year for a tour with Michael Bolton. She participated in the NBC casting show The Voice and, during her 7th semester, she was selected to take part in a bootcamp class by songwriter Kara DioGuardi. She created the song "Ride", which she would release after her debut single "Call Me Marilyn". Following graduation, she moved to Los Angeles to pursue a musical career.

== Career ==
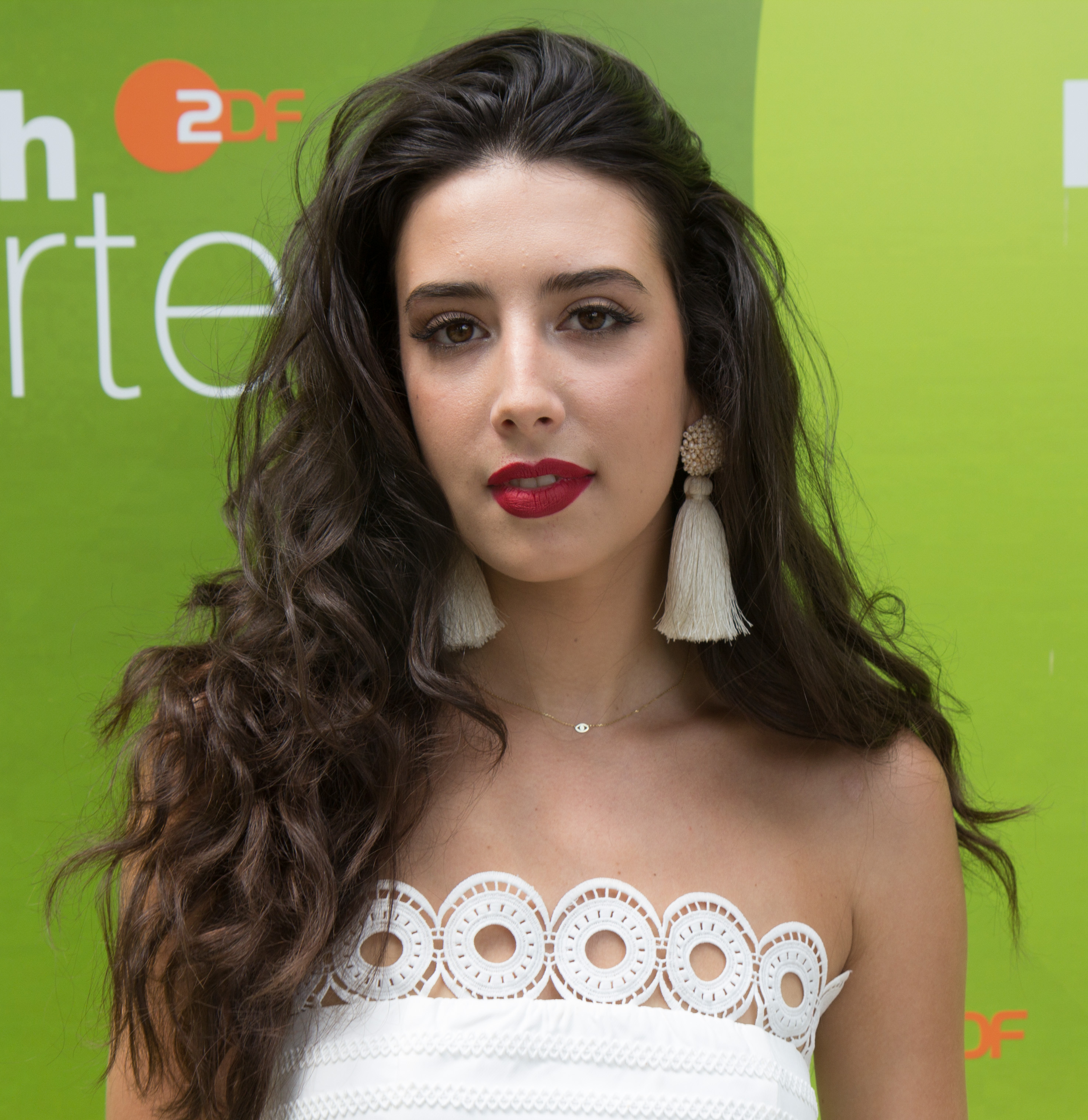
Naïka on the German TV show ZDF-Fernsehgarten

Her 2016 rendition of the Haitian traditional song "Papa Gèdè (Bel Gason)" received 200,000 clicks within two days and a total of over 1 million views. After the success of her 2017 debut single "Ride", which obtained 5 million Spotify streams – resulting in a second place on the platform's Global Viral chart – and charted in twelve countries, she signed a two-year contract with Capitol Records (a division of Universal Music).

After releasing several singles between 2017 and 2019, she rose to prominence in early 2020, when a TikTok video of her version of "Don't Rush" garnered over 20 million views in three months, drawing the attention of the original artists Young T & Bugsey. In 2020 and 2021, respectively, she released the EPs Lost in Paradïse, Pt. 1 and Lost in Paradïse, Pt. 2, under the label AWAL. In 2021, her song "Sauce" debuted in an Apple iPhone commercial during the Grammys telecast. In April 2024, Naïka made an appearance during Saint Levant's performance at Coachella 2024, duetting to an unreleased song. Her debut album, Eclesia, was released on February 20, 2026.

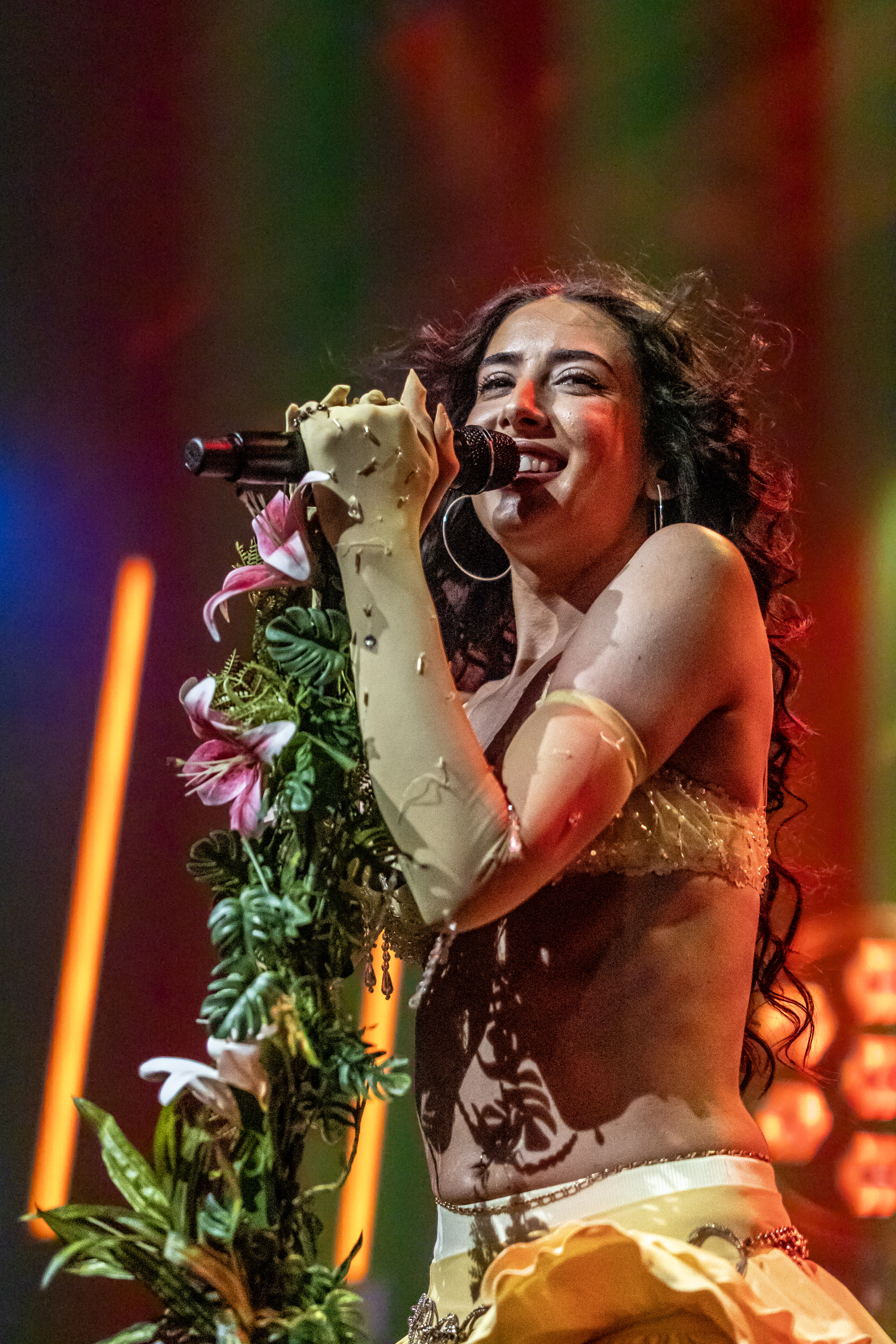
Naïka performing at the 60th Montreux Jazz Festival in 2026.

=== Artistry ===
Naïka is a multilingual artist, singing in French, Haitian Creole, and English. Her musical style, which she defines "world pop", is based on a mix of world music – blending European (particularly French), African, Caribbean and Afro-Caribbean music – with pop, soul and R&B. She cites childhood influences from Britney Spears, Destiny's Child, Usher, the Black Eyed Peas, Bob Marley, Miriam Makeba, Brenda Fassie and Nameless, as well as classical composers like Wolfgang Amadeus Mozart.

== Personal life ==
Naïka lives and works in Los Angeles. She identifies as a "third culture kid".

In December 2023, she started a relationship with Palestinian rapper Saint Levant; the couple announced their breakup via Instagram on September 25, 2025.

== Discography ==
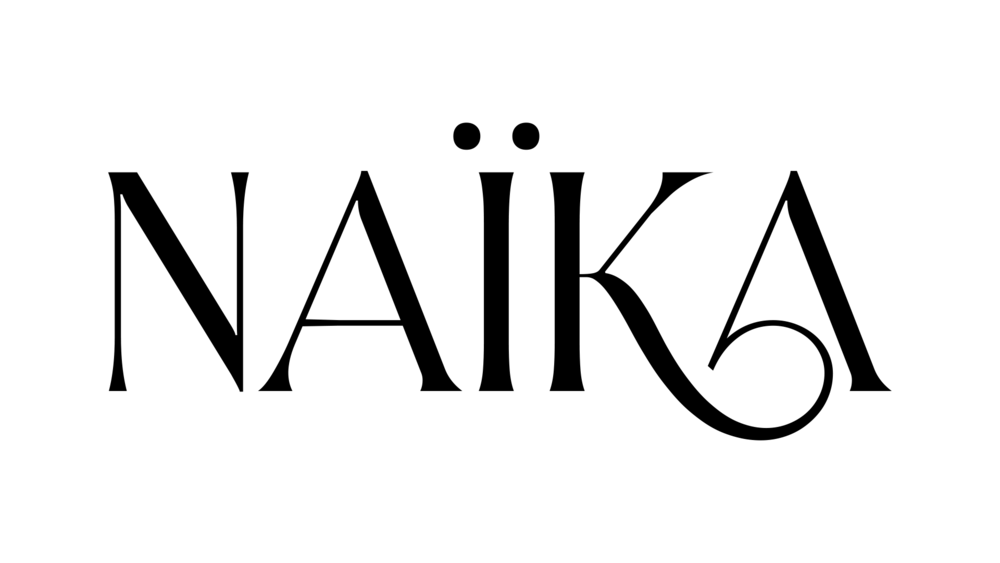
Naïka's logo in use since 2020

=== Albums ===
- Eclesia (2026)

=== EPs ===
- Lost in Paradïse, Pt. 1 (2020)
- Lost in Paradïse, Pt. 2 (2021)
- Transitions EP (2022)

=== Singles ===
- "Call Me Marilyn" (2017)
- "Ride" (2017)
- "Limbo" (2017)
- "Serpentine" (2018)
- "Oh Mama" (2018)
- "Blame" (2018)
- "Snowing in L.A." (2018)
- "Deja Vu" (2019)
- "Enchanté" (with SACHI; 2020)
- "Head in the Clouds" (feat. TeaMarrr; 2020)
- "Water" (2020)
- "African Sun" (2020)
- "Sauce" (2021)
- "Belle, Belle!" (2021)
- "Don't Lie" (2021)
- "H2O" (2022)
- "My Body, My Choice" (2022)
- "Guava" (2023)
- "Milkman" (2023)
- "Messi" (with June Freedom; 2023)
- "1+1 (Acoustic)" (2024)
- "6:45 (Acoustic)" (2024)
- "Messi (Sunset Mix)" (with June Freedom and Peace Control; 2024)
- "Layers" (2025)
- "Bloom" (2025)
- "Blessings" (2025)
- "Matador" (2025)
- "One Track Mind" (2026)
- "Welcome To Eclesia" (2026)
- "One Track Mind Part II" (with Kalash) (2026)

==== Charted singles ====
List of charted singles, showing year released, chart positions and album name
Title	Year	Peak chart positions					Album
Title	Year	FRA Air.	LBN	LBN Eng.	ROU Air.	ROU TV Air.	Album
"1+1"	2023	—	—	13	—	—	Non-album singles
"6:45"	2024	—	—	17	—	—	Non-album singles
"One Track Mind"	2026	6	—	*	43	17	Eclesia
"Welcome to Eclesia"	2026	—	15	*	—	—	Eclesia
"—" denotes a recording that did not chart or was not released in that territory. "*" denotes that the chart did not exist at that time.

==== As a featured artist ====
- "Blame" (Party Favor feat. Naïka; 2018)
- "Vynil" (Joss Austin feat. Nessly & Naïka; 2022)
- "Agua" (Michaël Brun feat. Naïka; 2024)
