= Kfardebian =

Kfardebian كفردبيان
- Municipality
- Location in Lebanon
- Coordinates: 33°59′11″N 35°46′16″E
- Country: Lebanon
- Governorate: Keserwan-Jbeil
- District: Keserwan

Area
  - Total: 40 km^{2} (15 sq mi)
- Elevation: 1,220 m (4,000 ft)
- Highest elevation: 2,465 m (8,087 ft)
- Lowest elevation: 600 m (2,000 ft)
- Time zone: UTC+2 (EET)
  - Summer (DST): UTC+3 (EEST)
- Dialing code: +961

Roman and Byzantine ruins of Faqra - Kfardebian

Kfardebian (Arabic: كفر دبيان, romanized: Kfar Dibiyān; also spelled Kfar Dibiane and also known as mazraat kfardebian) is a municipality in the Keserwan District of the Keserwan-Jbeil Governorate in Lebanon. It is located 45 kilometers north of Beirut. Its average elevation is 1,220 meters above sea level and its total land area is 2,960 hectares. Kfardebian inhabitants are predominantly Melkite and Maronite Christians.

Kfardebian gathers the oldest and largest skiing resorts in Lebanon and the Middle East, such as Mzaar ski resort and Faqra Kfardebian, as well as many historical and touristic sites, such as Roman and Byzantine ruins of Faqra.

In August 2023, the municipalities of Toulouse, France and Kfardebian signed an agreement of cooperation.

== Etymology ==
Kfardebian consists of two parts: Kfar which is Syriac word means small village, and Debian is another Syriac word, which literally means deer, thus Kfardebian means village of deer.

== History ==
In 1838, Eli Smith noted Kefr Dhibyân (كفر ذبيان) as a village located in "Aklim el-Kesrawan, Northeast of Beirut; the chief seat of the Maronites".

== See also ==
- Roman and Byzantine ruins of Faqra.

== Bibliography ==
- Robinson, E.; Smith, E. (1841). Biblical Researches in Palestine, Mount Sinai and Arabia Petraea: A Journal of Travels in the year 1838. Vol. 3. Boston: Crocker & Brewster.
