= Babylone (band) =

Algerian musical group

- Origin: Algeria
- Genres: Dziri style (Pop)
- Years active: 2012-present
- Labels: Aswatt Studio
- Members: Amine Mohamed Djemal; Rahim El Hadi; Ramzy Ayadi

Babylone (Arabic: بابيلون) is an Algerian musical group established in 2012 with three principal members: Amine Mohamed Djemal, Rahim El Hadi and Ramzy Ayadi. The band has released the studio album Brya in 2013 after huge success of their single "Zina" that won Algerian Song of the Year during the Algerian Music Awards 2014 with the band itself winning "Algerian Band of the Year". Babylone sings mainly in Algerian Darija in a musical style known as "dziri style", being Algerian world music with various international music influences. Their signature song "Zina" has been praised by several publications including Le Monde, Le Point, as well as being included in "the 50 Best Arabic Pop Songs of the 21st Century" by Rolling Stone. The song has been covered by multiple notable musicians including Chimène Bady, Julie Zenatti, La Fouine, and Kendji Girac.

== Career ==
The band's break came when they were featured in the popular Algerian radio show "Serial Taggeur" that encouraged young musical talents in the country. Their debut album Brya (The letter) was released in June 2013 with 10 songs including the band's massive hit "Zina" produced by Aswatt Studio. The song won the "Song of the Year" in Algeria.

The group promotes Algerian folk tradition from various localities mixing them with Andalousian, Arab, Mediterranean, Western, Oriental and African styles. In 2015, the group was nominated as one of the six finalists for "Best Traditional Group of Africa" during the Kora Awards (The KORA All Africa Music Awards 2016).

== Members ==
The band was launched in 2012 by Amine Mohamed Djemal, a singer songwriter and by Rahim El Hadi, a guitarist and composer coming from a very musical family. Childhood friends both originating from Gouraya, Tipaza, Algeria. With Djemal specializing in dentistry and El Hadi as a software specialist, they joined forces with Ramzy Ayadi, a university colleague and guitarist / composer originating from Constantine, Algeria specializing at the time as a software engineer at the same university.

In studio and in live concerts, to achieve a more complete sound, they are joined by guitarist Rafik Chami, bass player Redouane Nehar and percussionist Fouad Tourki.

Main

- Amine Mohamed Djamel - vocals and guitar
- Rahim El Hadi - lead guitar
- Ramzy Ayadi - guitare

Auxiliary

- Rafik Cham - guitar
- Redouane Nehar - bass
- Fouad Tourki - percussion
- Islam Benzina (supervisor)

== Discography ==
=== Albums ===
- 2013: Brya

=== Singles ===
- 2012: "Zina"
- 2014: "Kahlete Laâyoune"
- 2017: "Bekitini"
- 2018: "La La"
- 2018: "Alach"
- 2021: "Kataa Lbhour" (in Arabic قاطع لبحور)

== See also ==
- Khaled
- Cheb Mami
- Music of Algeria
