= Cheb Bilal =

Algerian raï folk singer (born 1966)

Cheb Bilal الشاب بلال
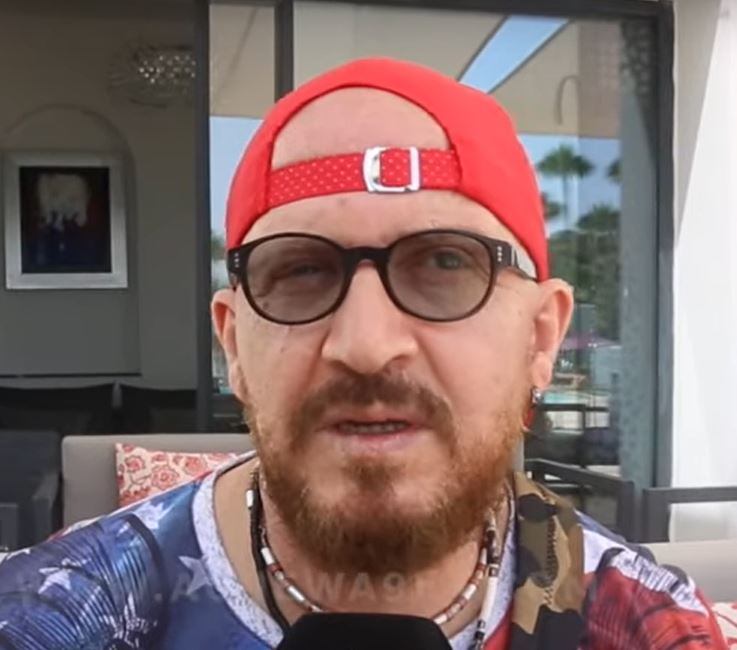
- Cheb Bilal 2021

Background information
- Birth name: Bilal Mouffok
- Born: 23 July 1966 (age 58); Cherchell, Algeria
- Origin: Oran, Algeria
- Genres: Raï
- Occupation: Singer
- Years active: 1980–present
- Labels: RedSone, Sun House, AVM Edition
- Website: bilalofficiel.com

Bilal Mouffok (Arabic: بلال موفق, romanized: Bilāl Muwaffaq; born 23 July 1966), known professionally as Cheb Bilal (Arabic: الشاب بلال, romanized: ash-Shābb Bilāl, lit. 'the Young Bilal'), is an Algerian raï singer, He produces traditional music that includes instruments like congas and violins.

== Career ==
Bilal spent much of his youth in Oran, where he studied at the conservatory of music. He was raised by his grandparents after his parents divorced at a young age.

Initially, Cheb Bilal performed at weddings and festivals around Oran. In 1980, he created the group El Ahouar. In 1989, he went to Marseille, France, which he described as a turning point in his career.
