= Ab-o-Atash Park =

Park in Tehran, Iran

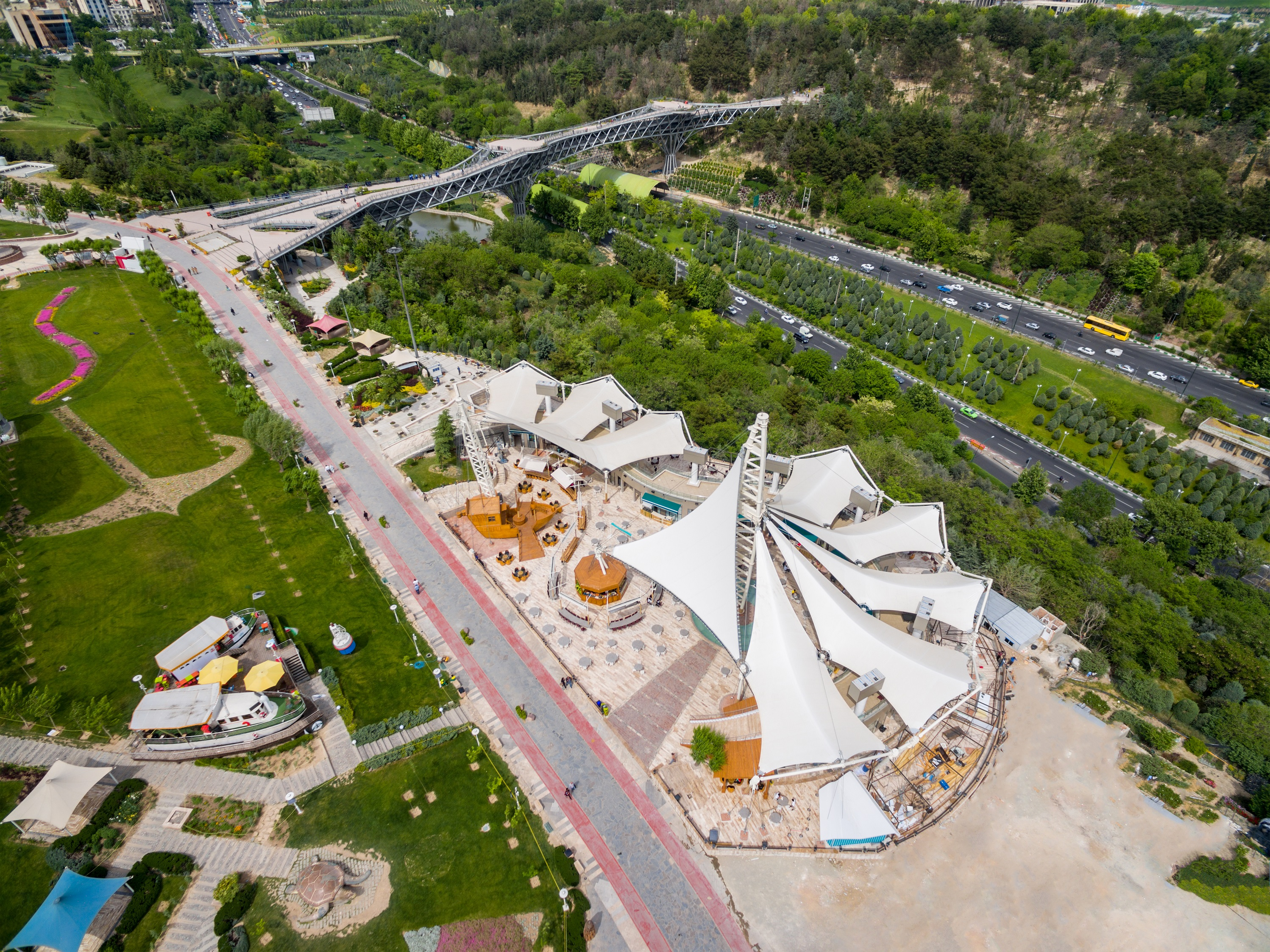
- Ab-o-Atash and Banader parks are attached together
- Interactive map of Ab-o-Atash Park
- Type: Urban park
- Location: Northern Tehran, Iran
- Coordinates: 35°45′14.869″N 51°25′5.809″E
- Area: Over 24,000 square meters (260,000 sq ft)
- Status: Open

Ab-o-Atash Park (Persian: پارک آب و آتش, romanized: Pārk-e Āb-o-Ātaš, lit. 'Water-and-Fire Park'), also known as the Ebrahim Park (Persian: پارک ابراهیم, Pārk-e Ebrāhim), is a park in northern Tehran, Iran. With an area over 24,000 square meters (260,000 sq ft), the park was opened on June 27, 2009 by the 55th Mayor of Tehran, Mohammad Baqer Galibaf.

== Features ==
The park has an exclusive area designed for water-playing. There is also an amphitheater in the park.

== Events ==
=== Water fight ===
On 29 July 2011, a water fight event organized by Facebook was held at the park. It ended with the arresting of 10 participants who were accused of "unacceptable behavior."

== Gallery ==
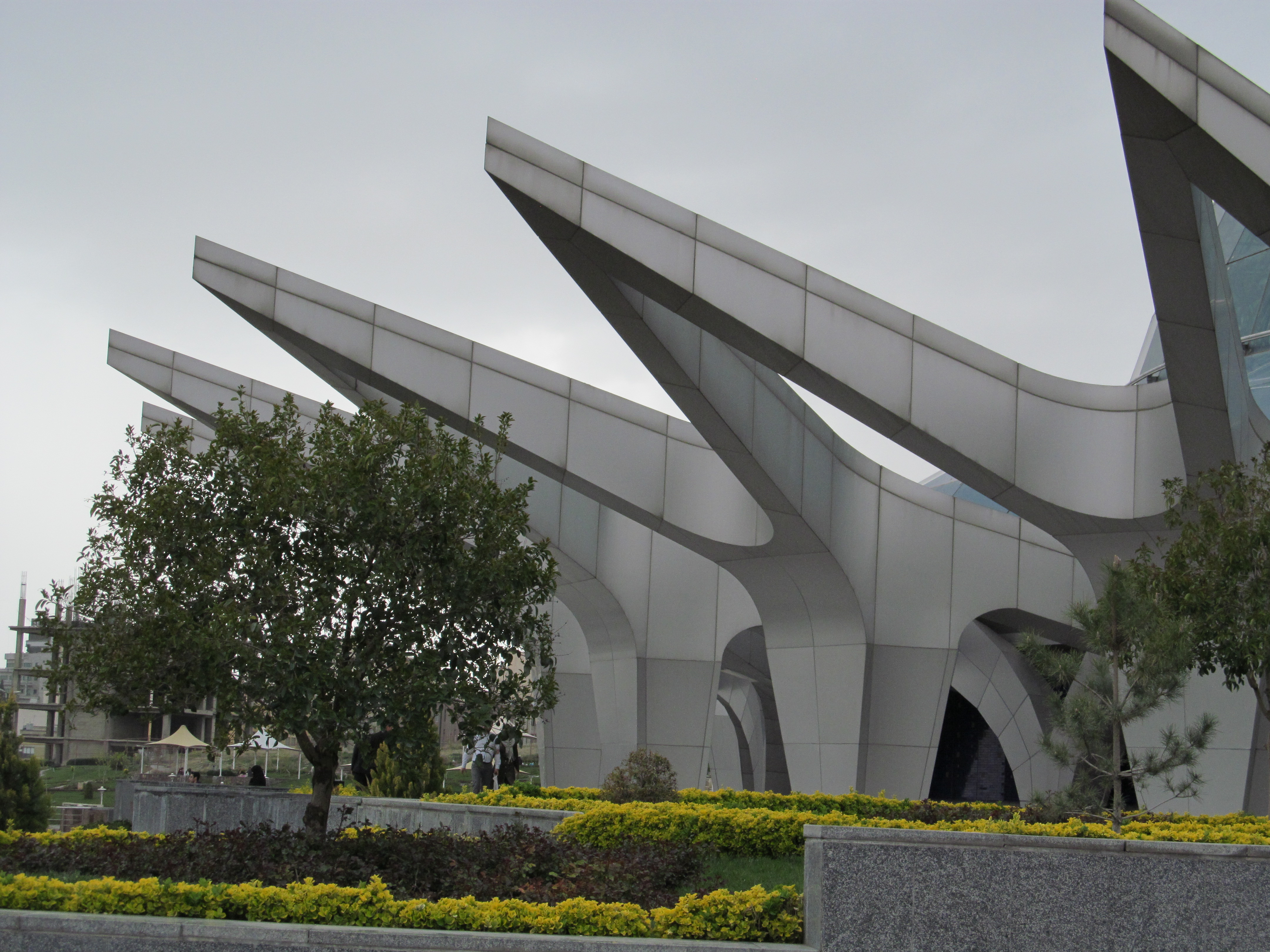
The planetarium at the park

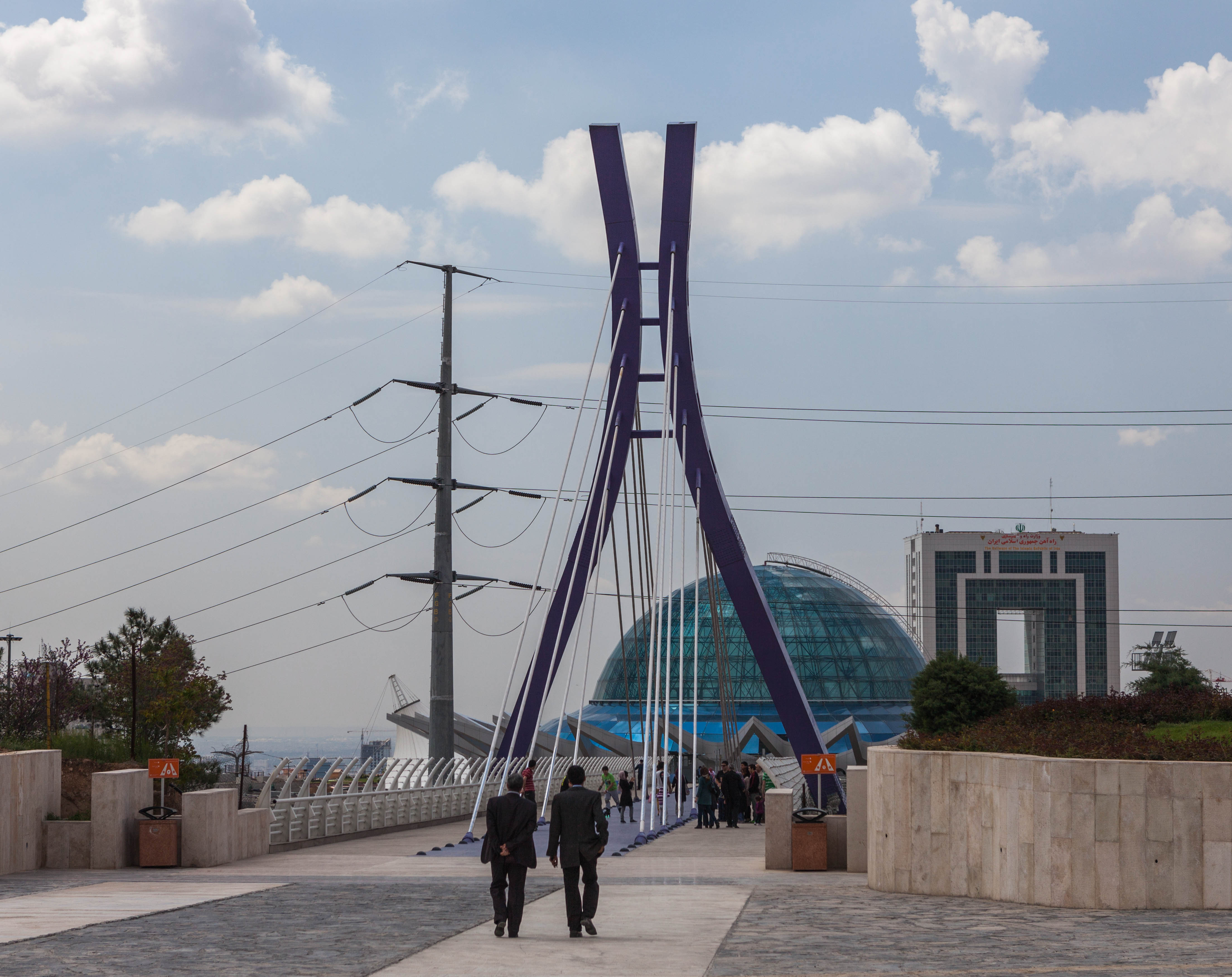
Abrisham Bridge connects the park to Nowruz Park

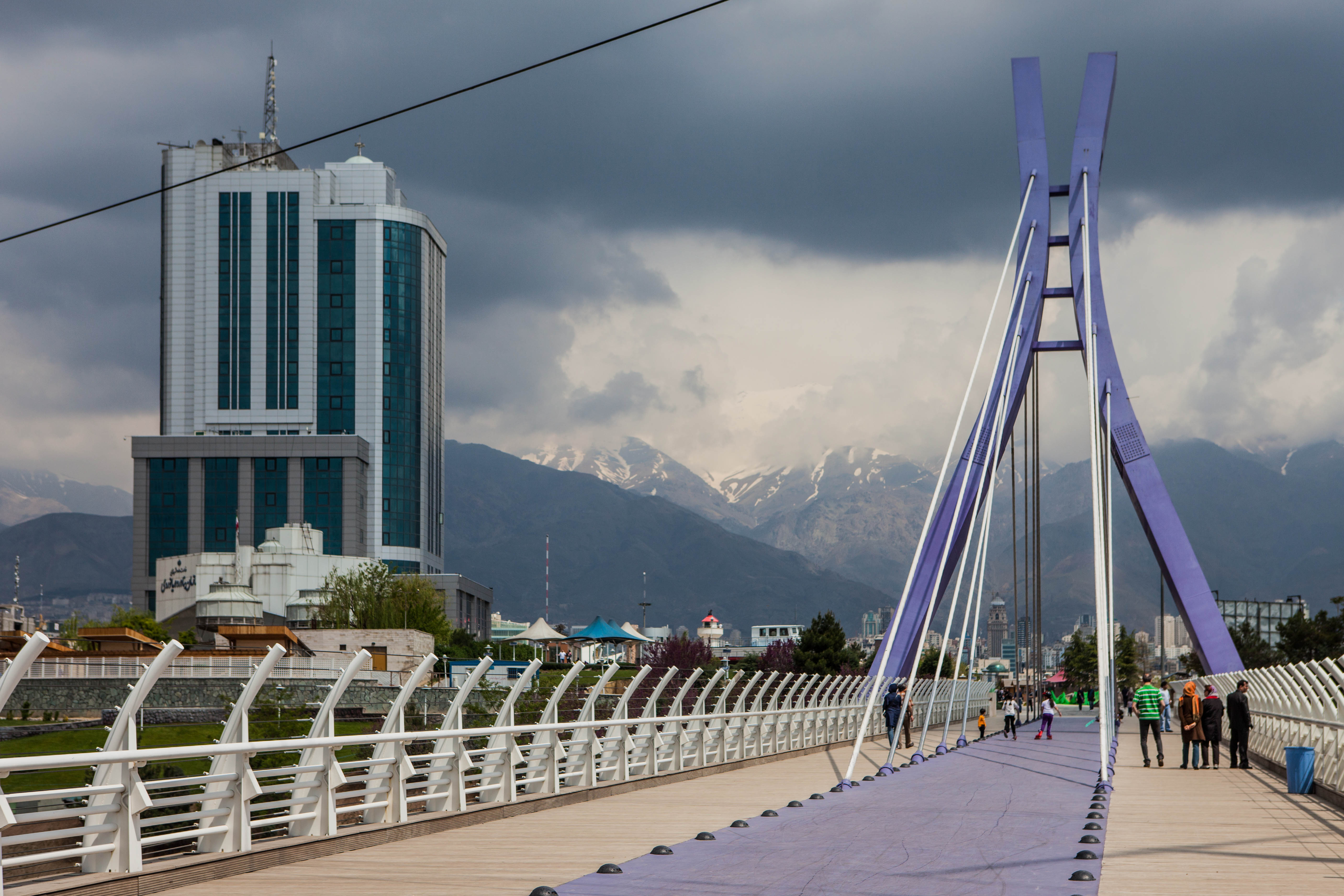
Another view of the Abrisham Bridge

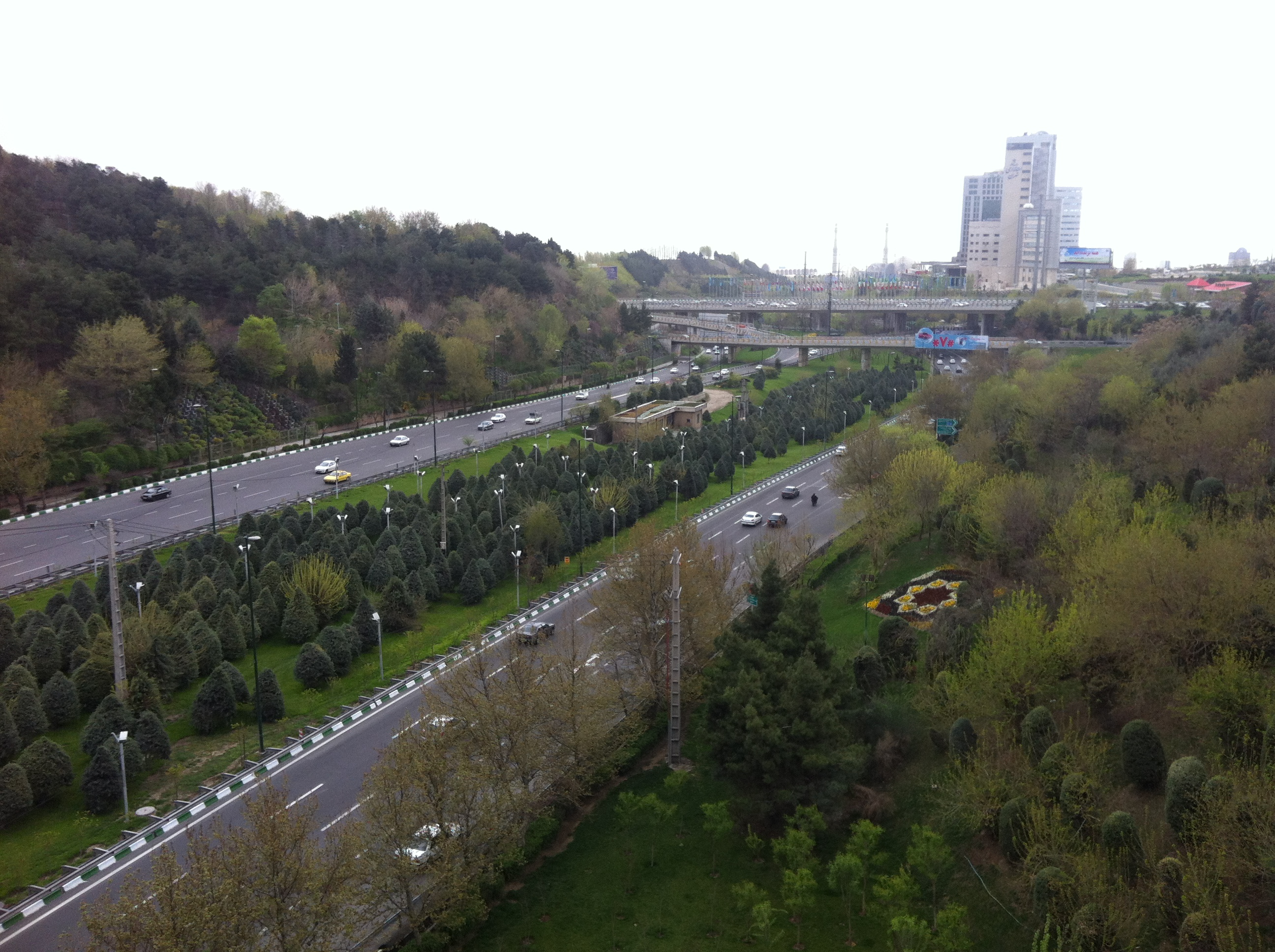
Modares Expressway seen from Tabiat Bridge

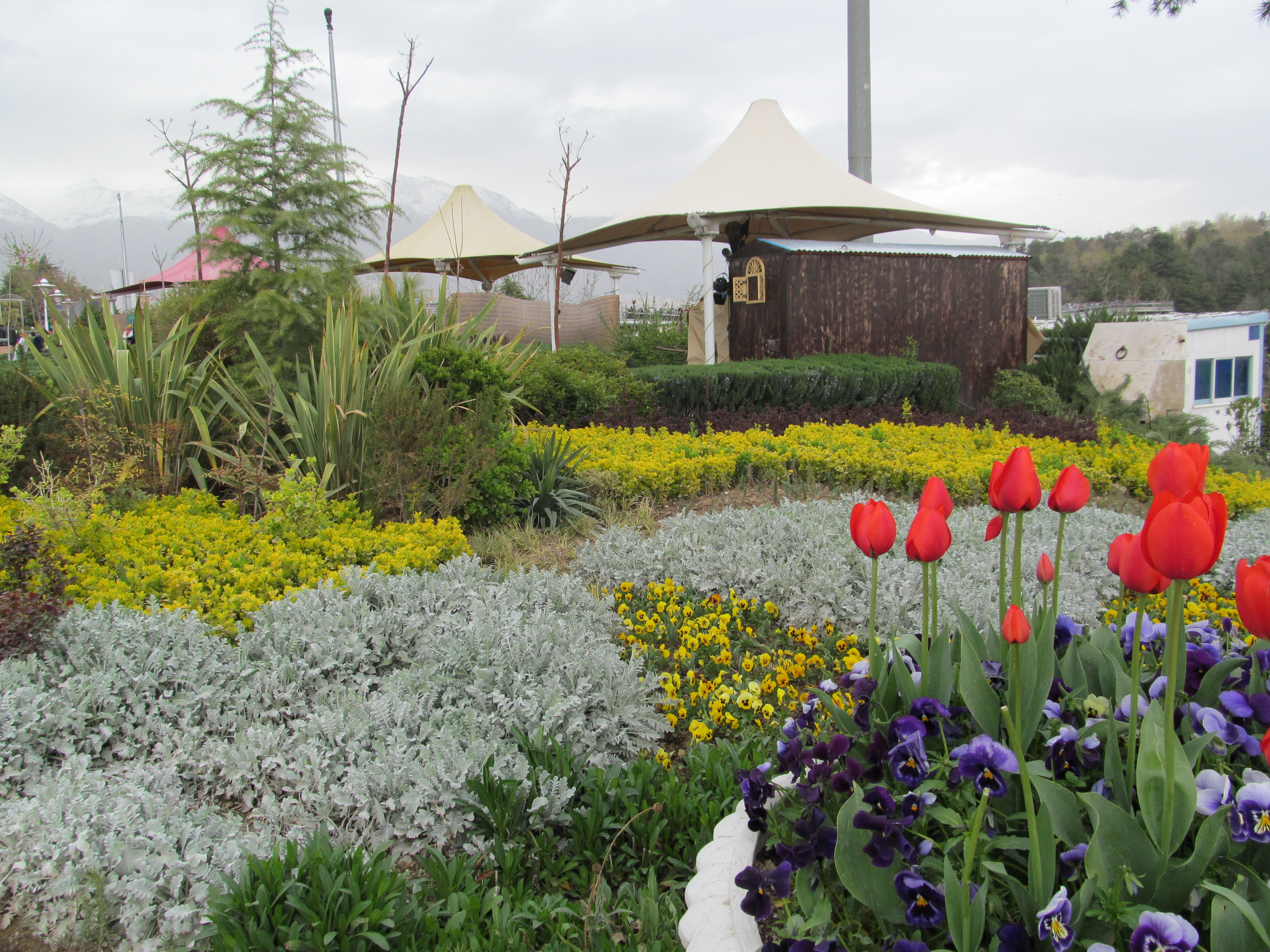
Botanic gardens at Ab-o-Atash Park

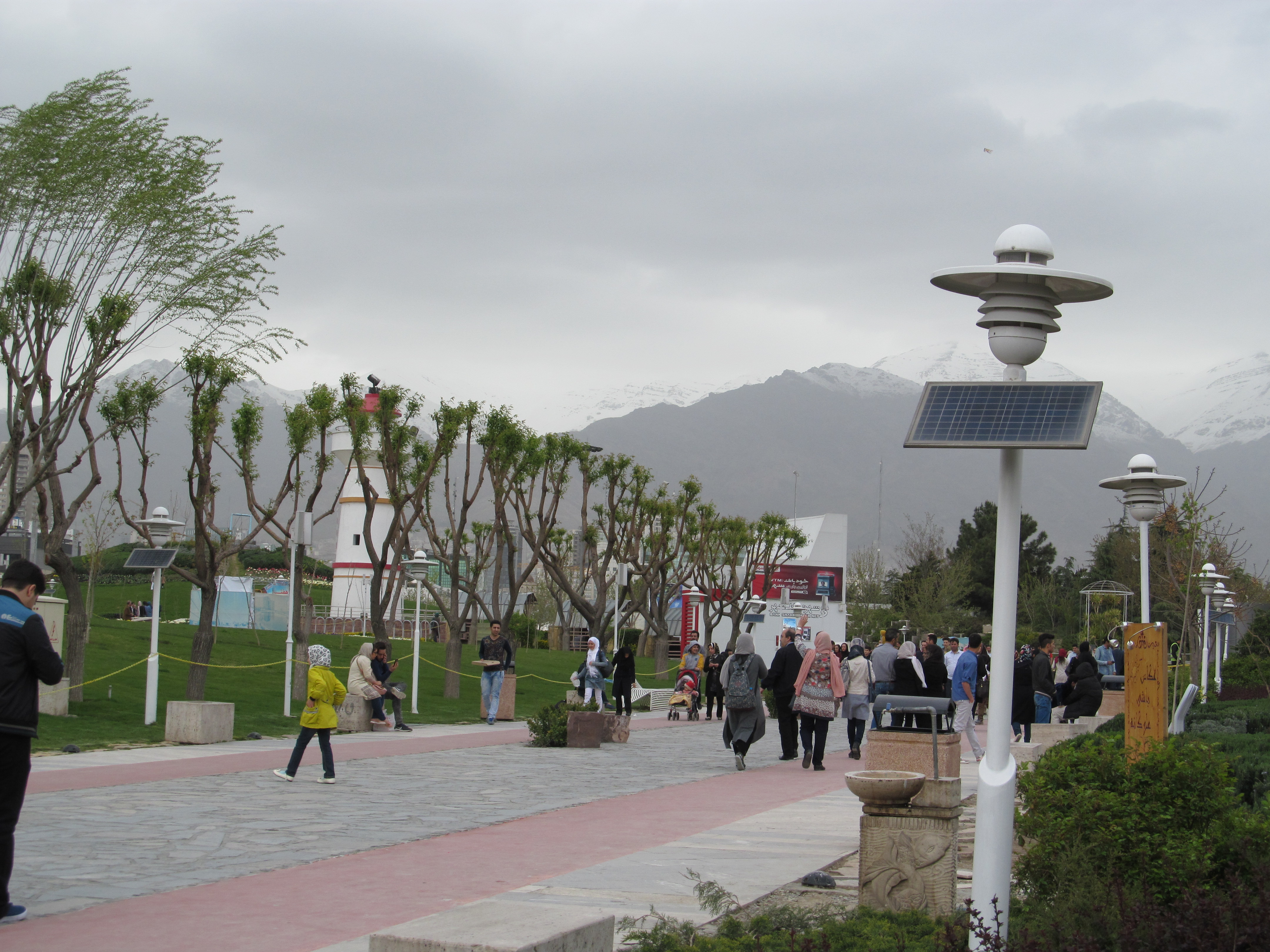
Ab-o-Atash Park is packed with visitors during the Iranian New Year

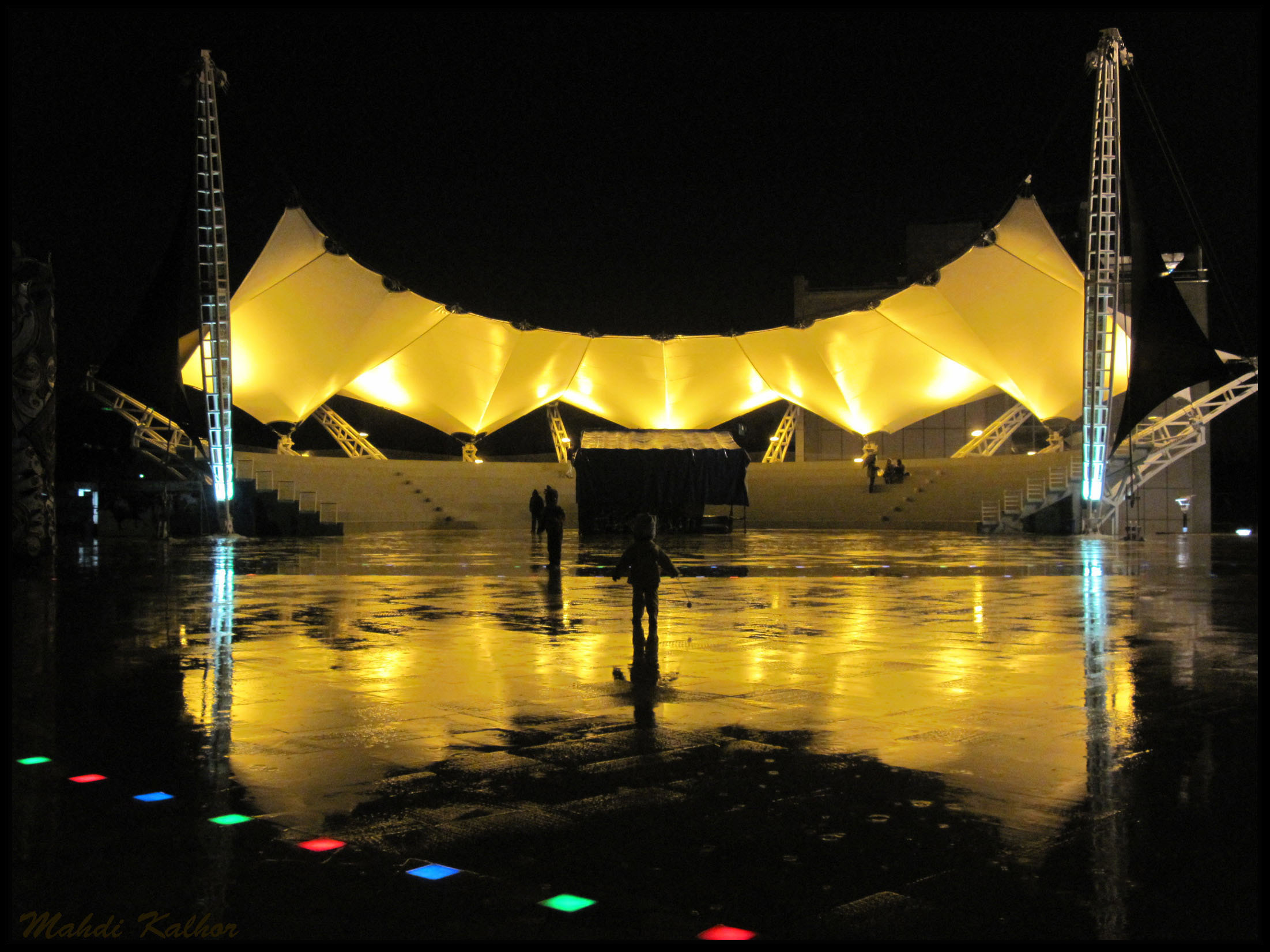
Park at night

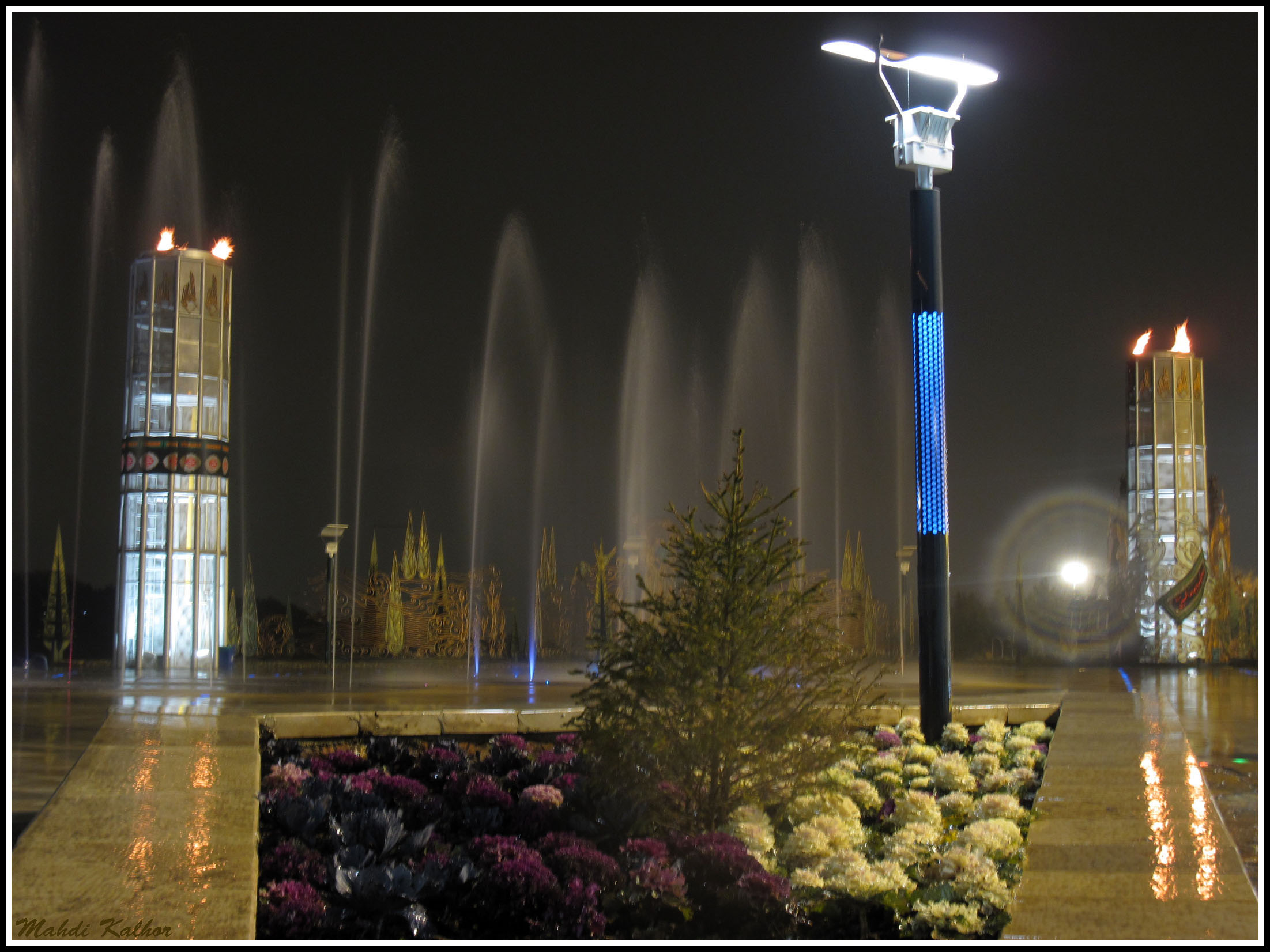
Water fountains at night

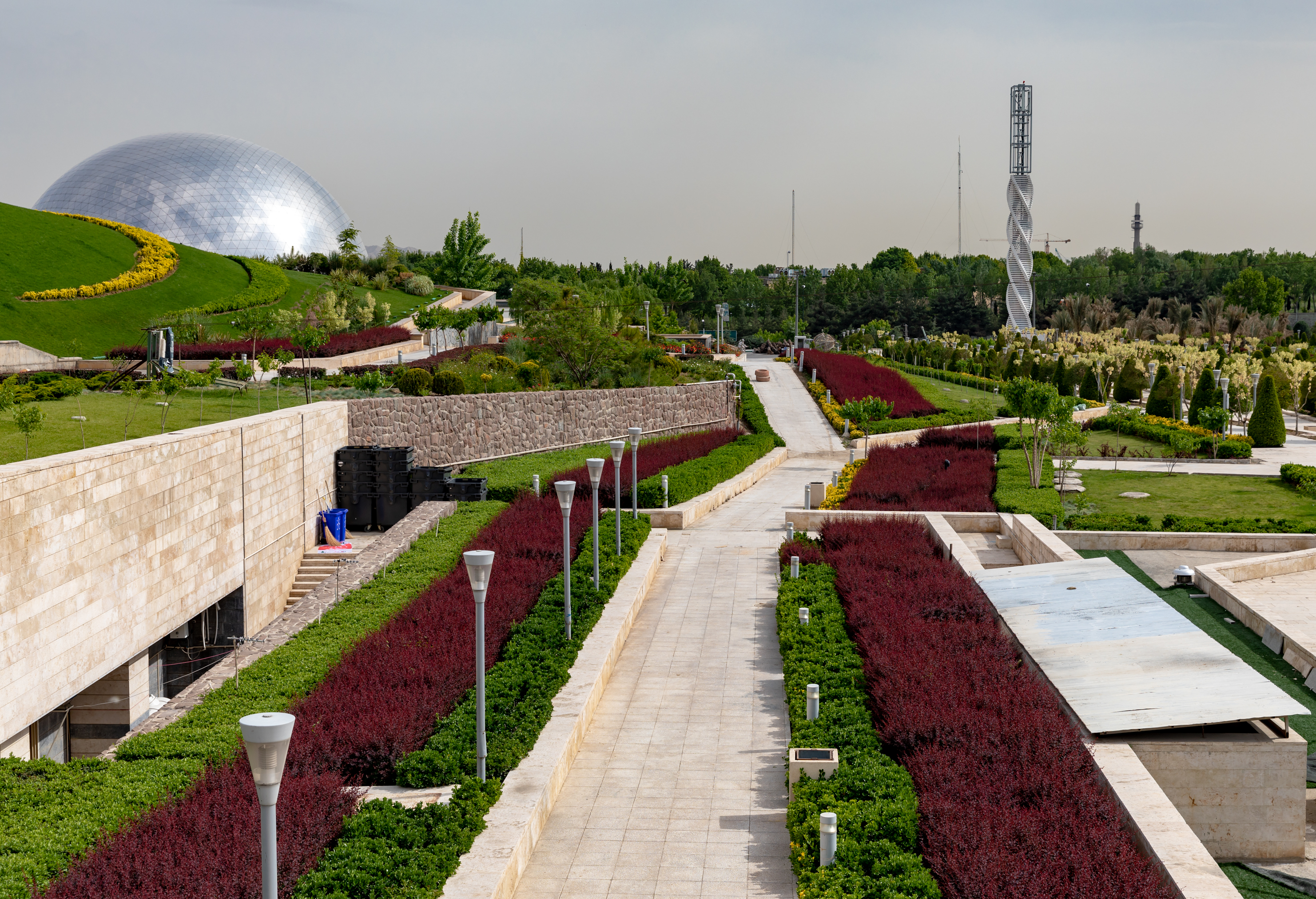
Holy Defense Museum

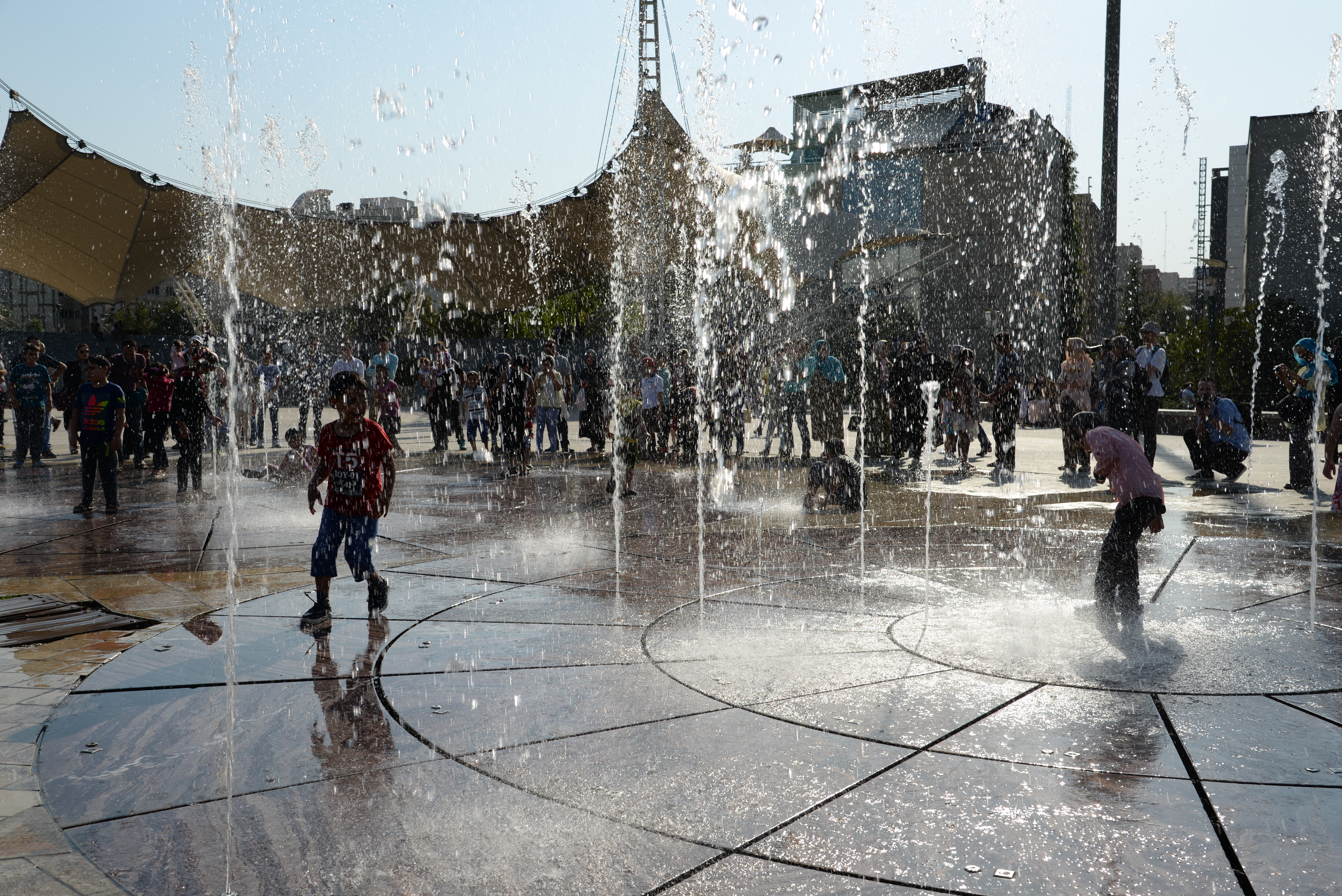
Children's water play in the fountains of the park.

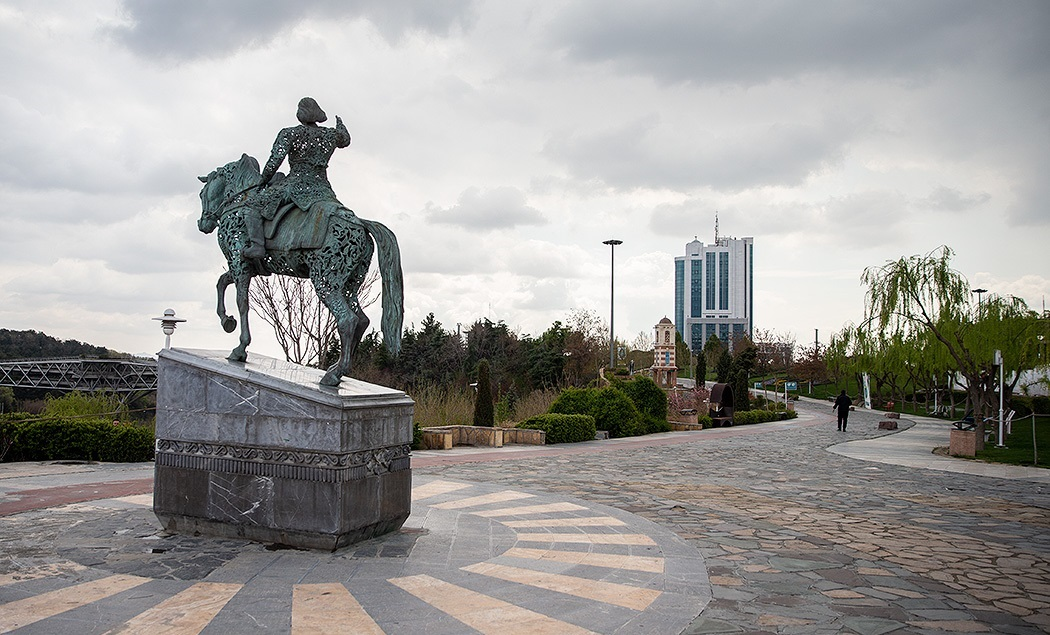
Statue of Siyâvash from the Shahnameh

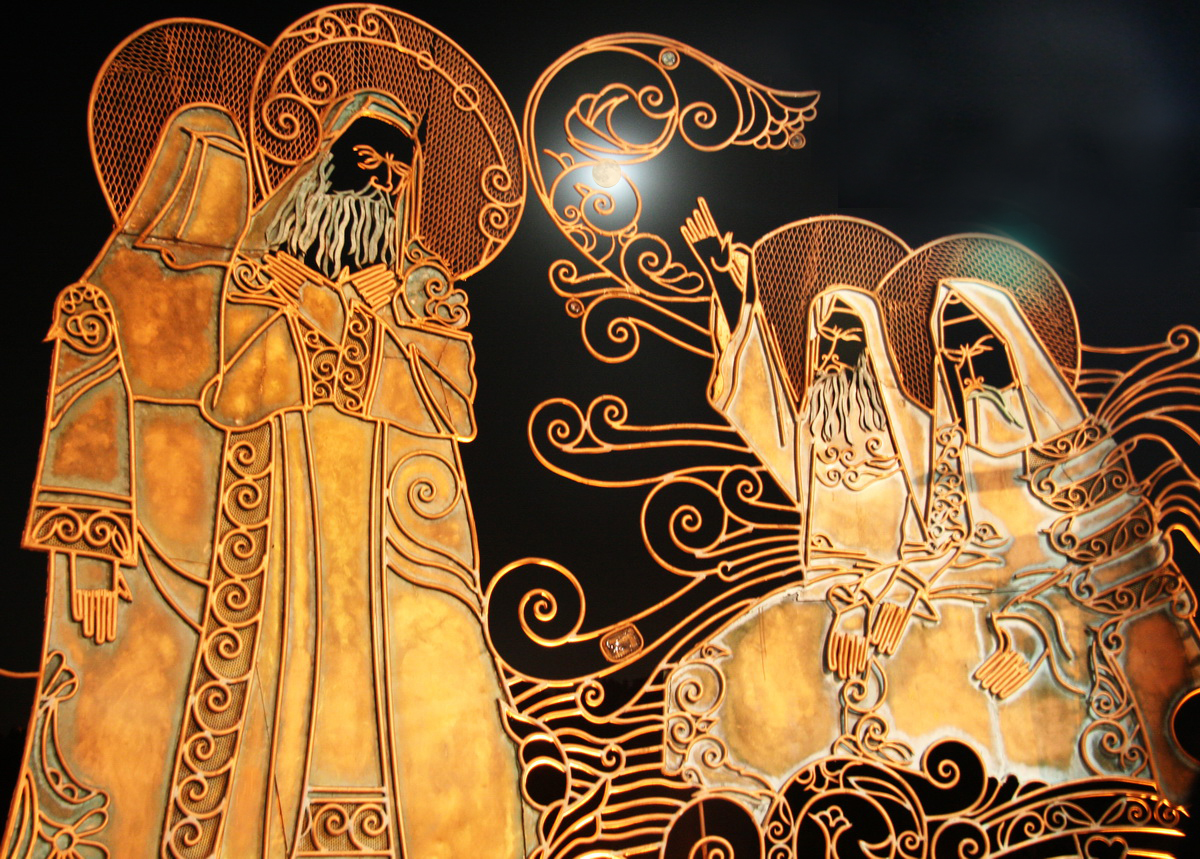
Statue of Ebrahim in fire

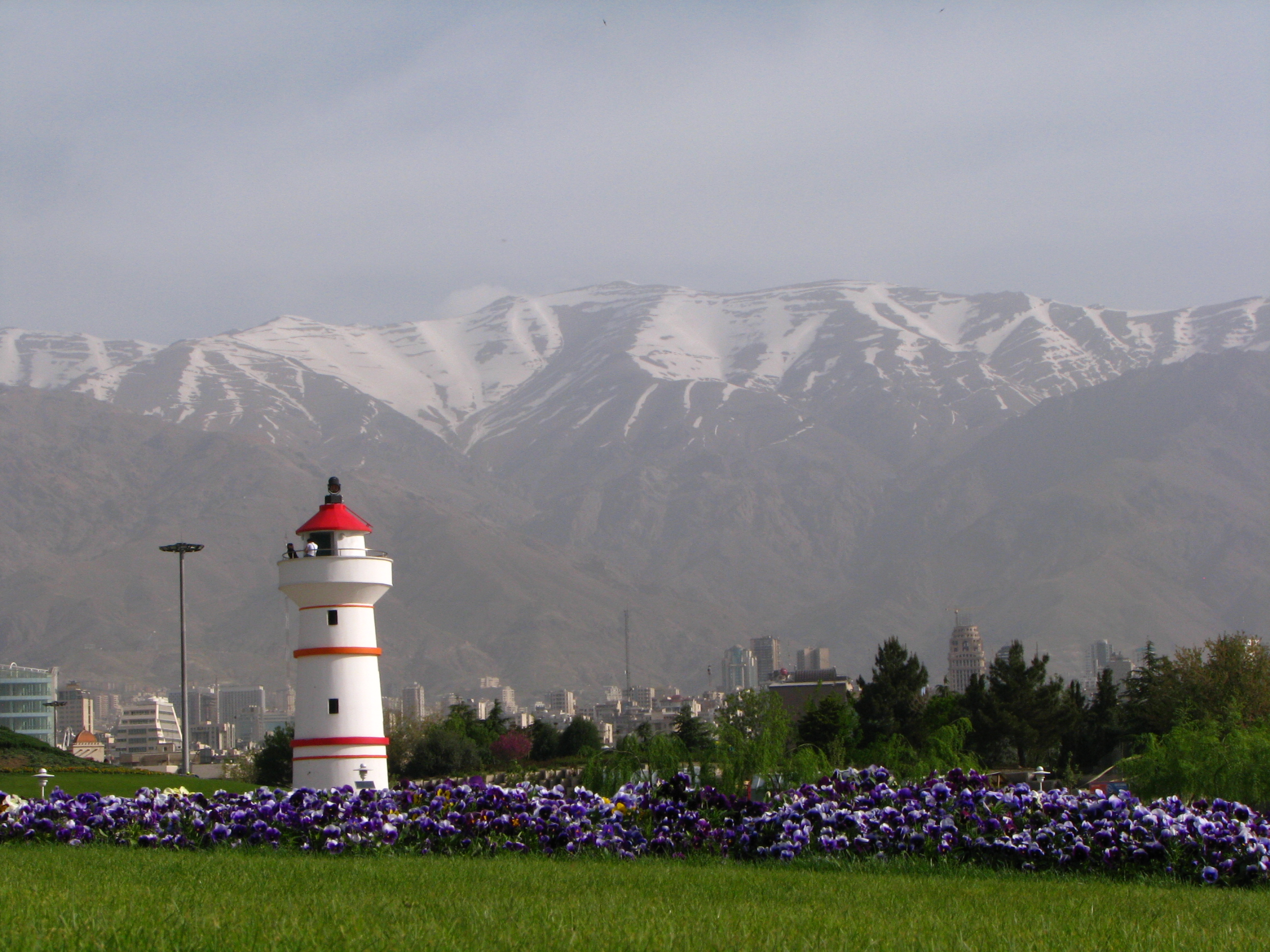
Park's lantern
