= Abrisham Bridge =

Bridge in Iran

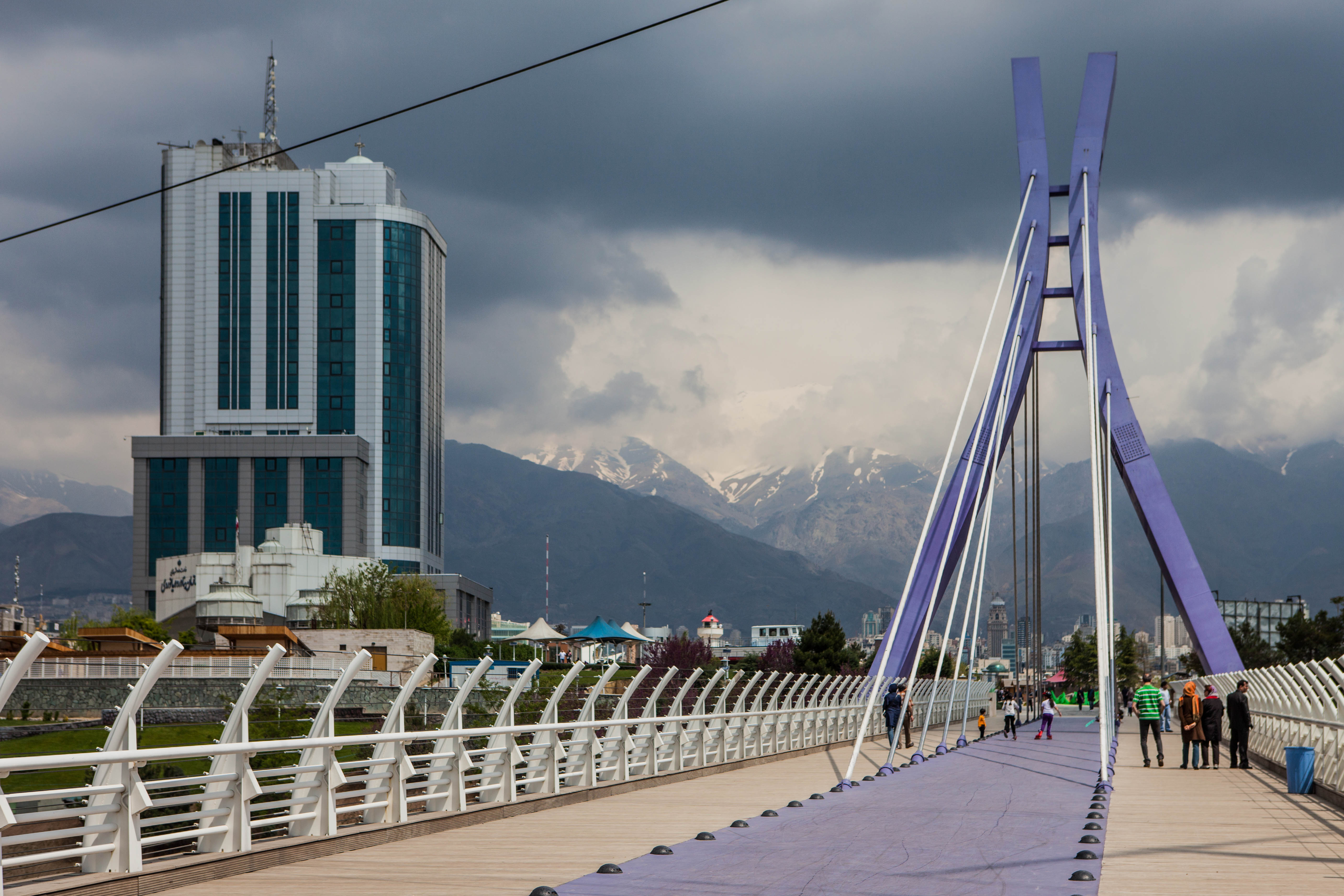
- Coordinates: 35.750992°N 51.418499°E

History
- Opened: 2008; 18 years ago

Location
- Interactive map of Abrisham Bridge

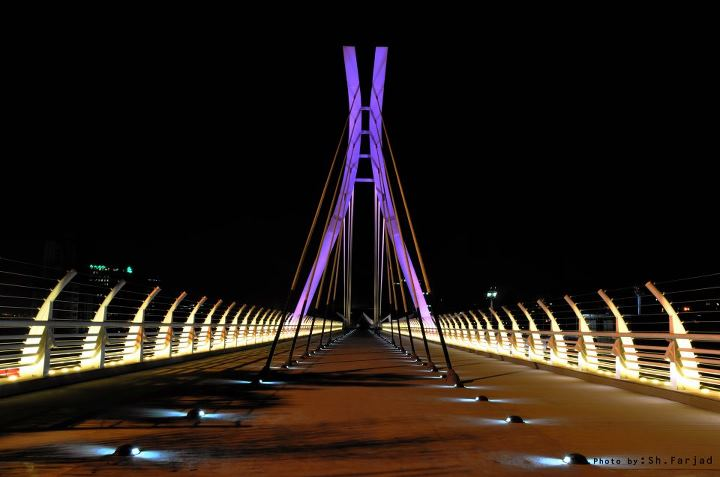
Abrisham Bridge at night

Abrisham Bridge (Persian: پل ابریشم, Pol-e Abrišam), literally the "Silk Bridge", is a cable-stayed bridge in Northern Tehran, Iran. It is located about 100 meters south of the Iran's Shipping Lines Tower, in the district of Abbas Abad. Extending in a north-south direction, it is intended solely for pedestrian traffic. It bridges the urban highway Hemmat Expressway, and connects the parks Ab-o-Atash and Nowruz.

Abrisham Bridge was designed in 2007-08, and built by local Iranian contractors. The cable manufacturing company was a major associate with the Liuzhou OVM Machinery, a Chinese manufacturer of cables. The structure of the bridge has a tilted pylon on its north side. Regarding its tilted tower, it was the first of its kind in Tehran. The footpath is supported by 20 cables composed of 12 wires, asymmetrically distributed on the two sides. The length of the longest cable is about 53 meters, and the shortest is about 20 meters; the height of the pylon is about 40 meters; the greatest span of the bridge is about 132.85 meters; and the width of the whole bridge is about 10.5 meters.
