= Leila Araghian =

Iranian architect (born 1983)

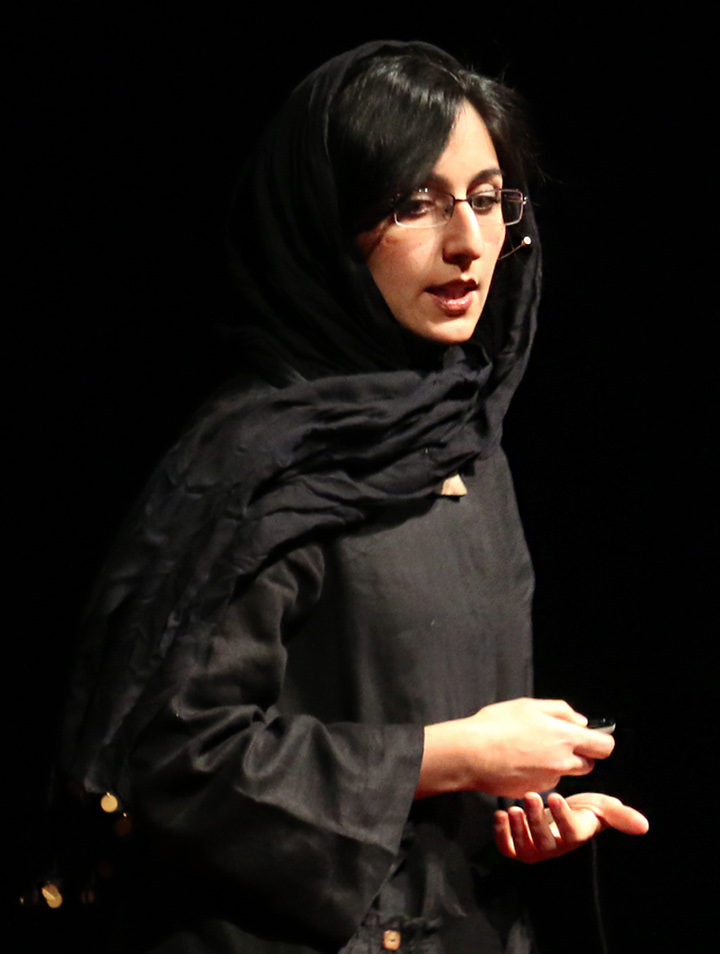
- Born: Leila Araghian; 1983 (age 42–43); Tehran, Iran
- Education: Shahid Beheshti University; University of British Columbia
- Occupation: Architect
- Buildings: Tabiat Bridge

Leila Araghian (Persian: لیلا عراقیان; born 1983) is an Iranian architect. She has a master's degree in architecture from the University of British Columbia, where she won the UBC Architecture Alumni Henry Elder Prize. She previously studied architecture in Iran, at Shahid Beheshti University.

In 2005, Araghian co-founded Diba Tensile Architecture, a company specialising in the design, manufacture and installation of membrane structures. She was chief architect and designer of the Tabiat Bridge in Tehran, a pedestrian bridge opened in late 2014 which has won several prizes, including the 2016 Aga Khan Award for Architecture for Architecture, and the Popular Choice award in the Highways & Bridges category of Architizer's 2015 A+ Awards.

Araghian's Iranian heritage has restricted her international exposure; she was not allowed to enter the World Architecture Festival because of sanctions against Iran. The architect herself spoke out against the sanctions because according to her, "this is ridiculous, I’m an Iranian architect and this is a cultural activity, it has absolutely nothing to do with politics."

She was photographed in September 2015 by Brandon Stanton for the Humans of New York trip to Iran.

== Projects by Diba Tensile Architects (selection) ==
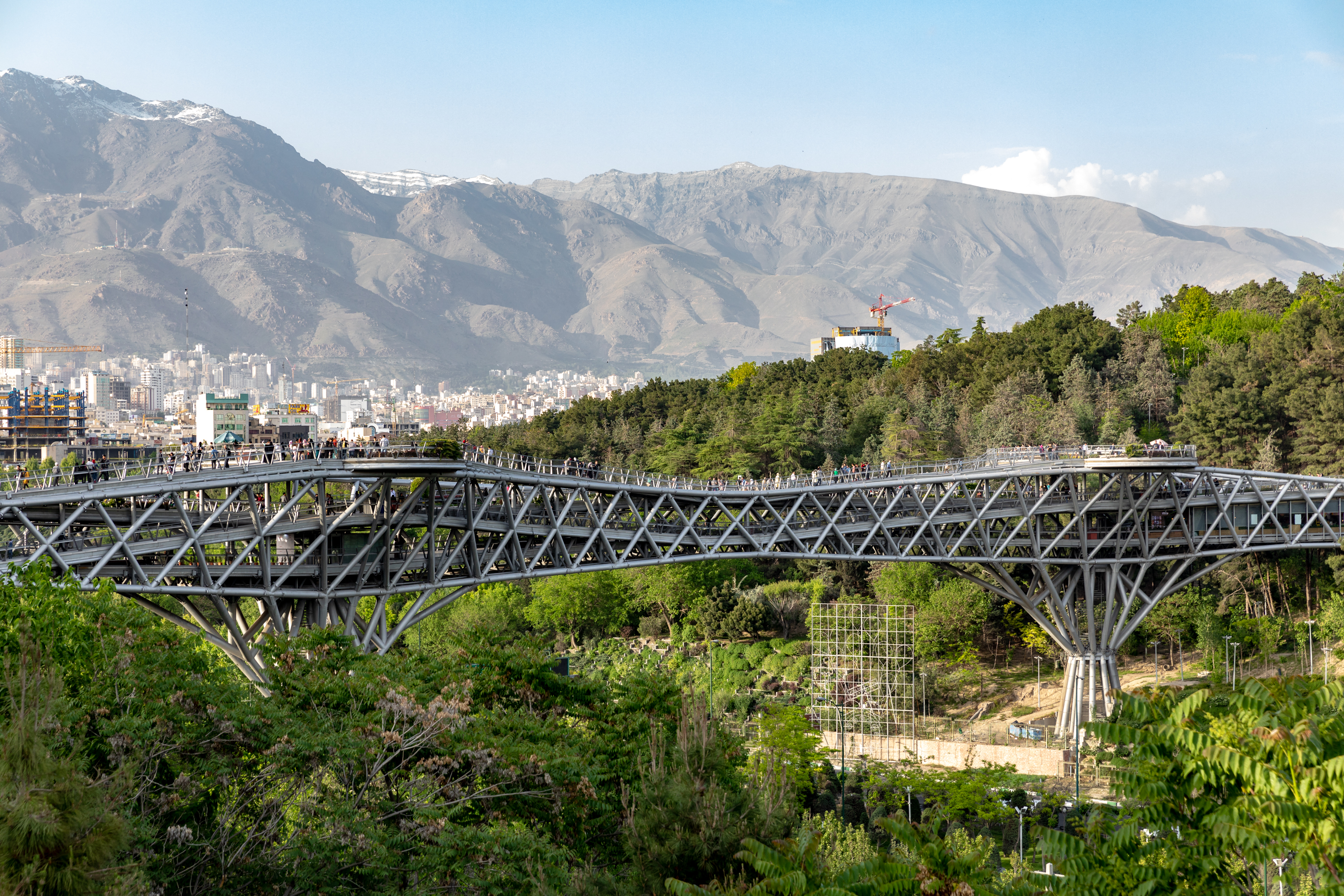
Tabiat pedestrian bridge, Tehran

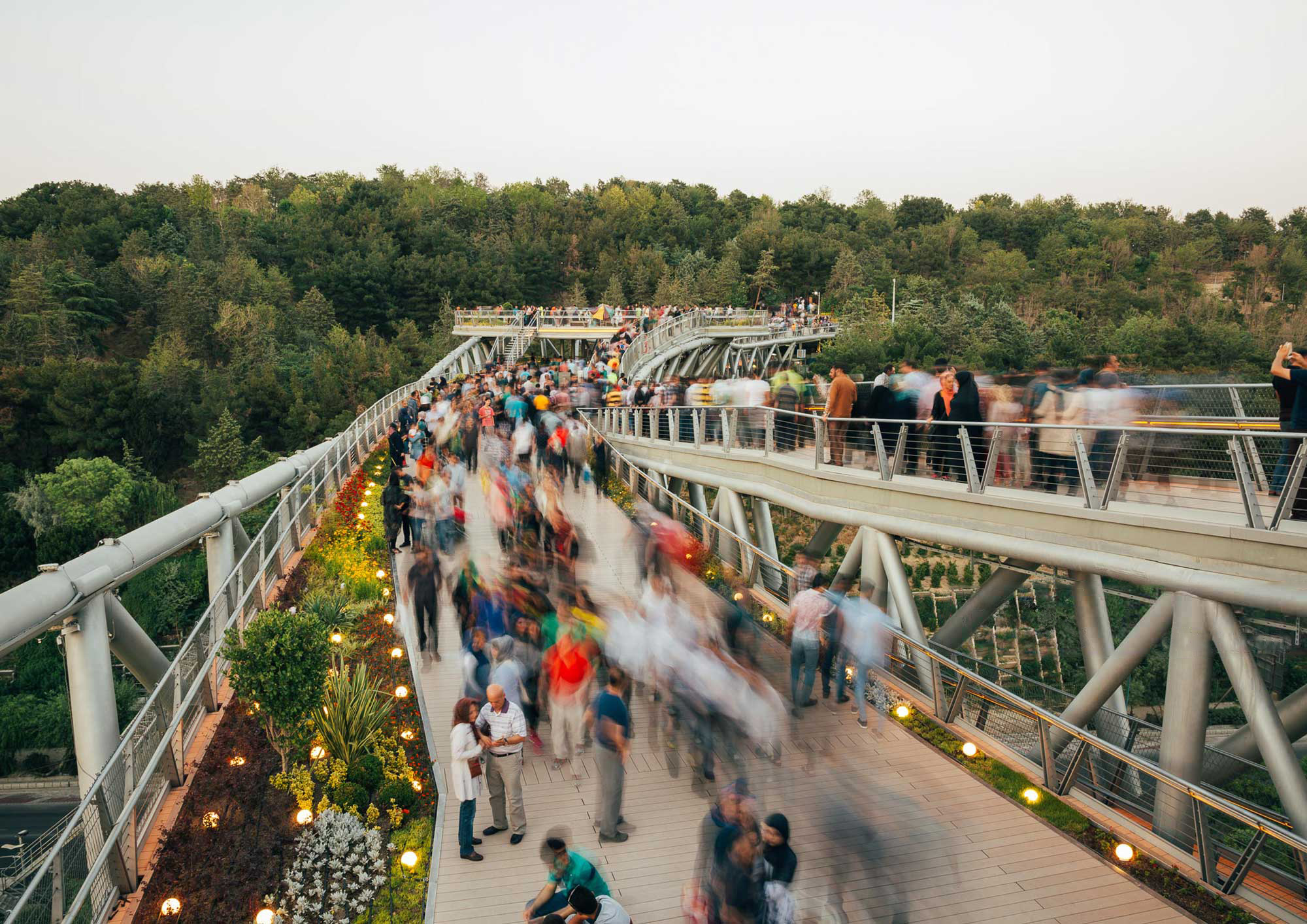
Tabiat pedestrian bridge

- Tabiat pedestrian bridge, Tehran (2014).
- Facade of platinum shopping center, Tehran (2019).
- Covered entrance of the Bazarganan hospital (2019).
- Azadi Innovation Factory. Conversion of an electrode factory into a house for rentable offices (2019).
- Corridor roofing at Baghdad International Airport (2021).
