= Tabiat Bridge =

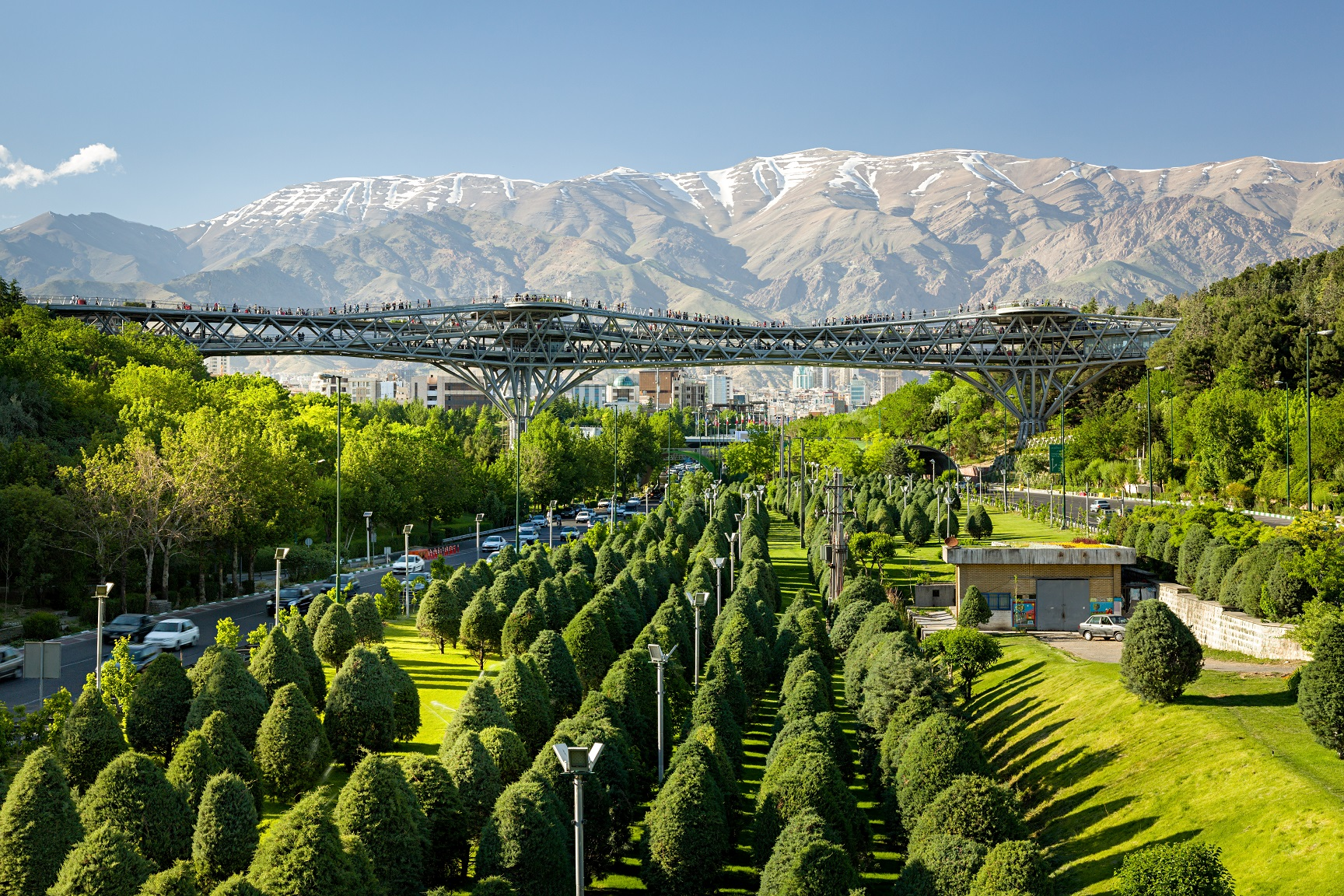
- Coordinates: 35°45′16″N 51°25′14″E
- Crosses: Modares Expressway
- Locale: Tehran, Iran
- Official name: Pole Tabiat

Characteristics
- Design: Footbridge

History
- Designer: Leila Araghian
- Contracted lead designer: Diba Tensile Architecture
- Construction start: 2010
- Construction end: 2014

Location
- Interactive map of Tabiat Bridge

The Tabi'at Bridge (Persian: پل طبیعت, lit. 'The bridge of nature') is the largest pedestrian overpass in Tehran, Iran. The 270-metre (890 ft) bridge connects two public parks — Taleghani Park and Abo-Atash Park — by spanning Modarres Expressway, one of the main highways in northern Tehran.

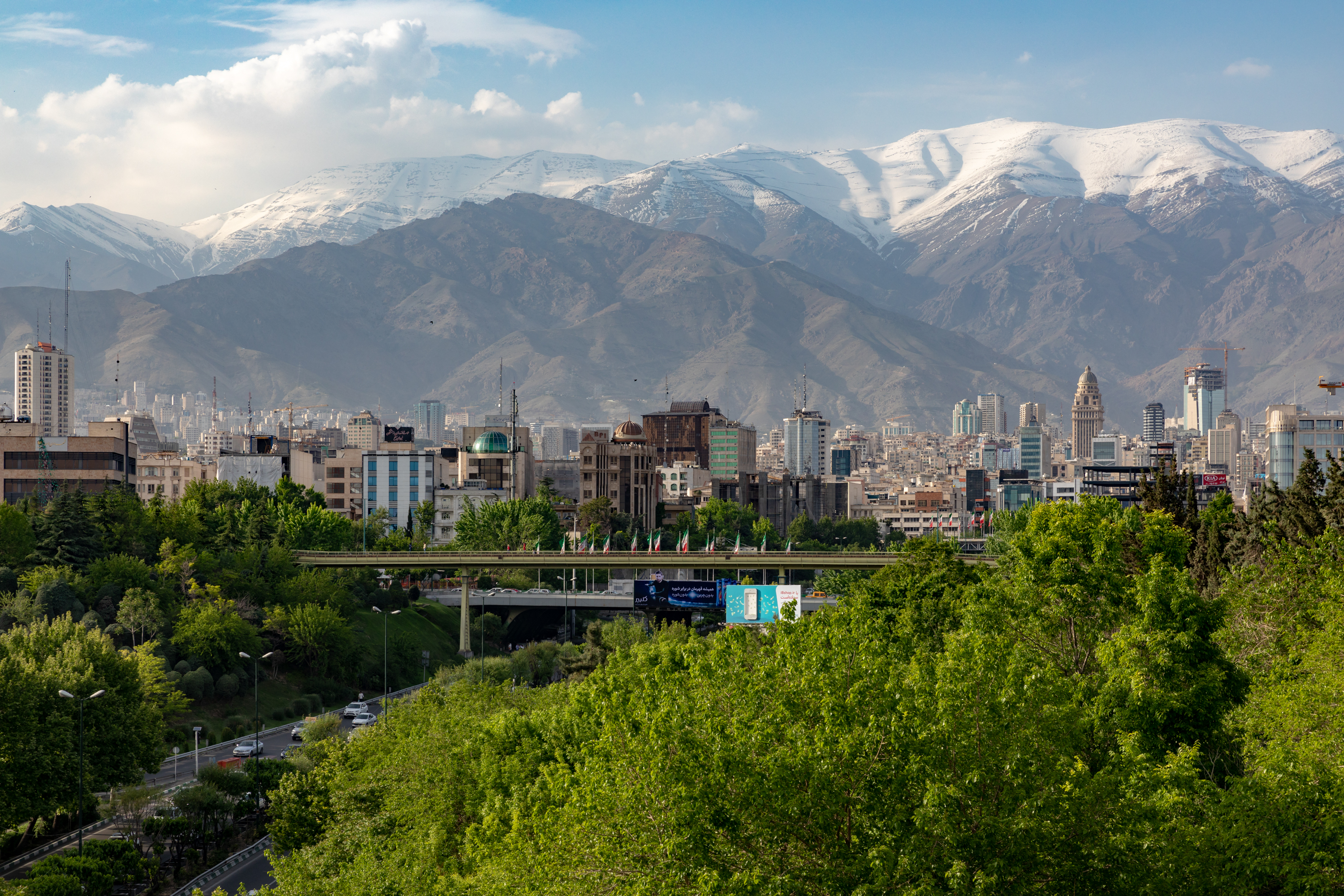
Tabiat Bridge in April 2018

The bridge was designed by Diba Tensile Architecture (Leila Araghian and Alireza Behzadi). It has won several awards, including the Popular Choice Prize for Highways & Bridges from the Architizer A+ Awards, a global architectural competition based in New York. The bridge also won the 2016 Aga Khan Award for Architecture for its exemplary approach to an infrastructure project, "a breath of fresh air" according to the award jury.

== History ==
Designed by Leila Araghian, the Tabiat Bridge emerged as the winning proposal in a local design competition aimed at linking two parks in northern Tehran that were divided by a major highway. In designing the bridge, a process which took a total of 4 years, Araghian wanted it to "be a place for people to stay and ponder, not simply pass." To achieve this, the bridge is not straight and contains benches and seating.

Construction of the bridge started in 2010, using a total of 2000 tonnes of steel and 10000 cubic metres of concrete before it was finished in October 2014. Construction of the bridge over a large highway was described as a big challenge, with platforms and temporary tunnels built to ensure that nothing fell onto the road below.

== Architecture ==
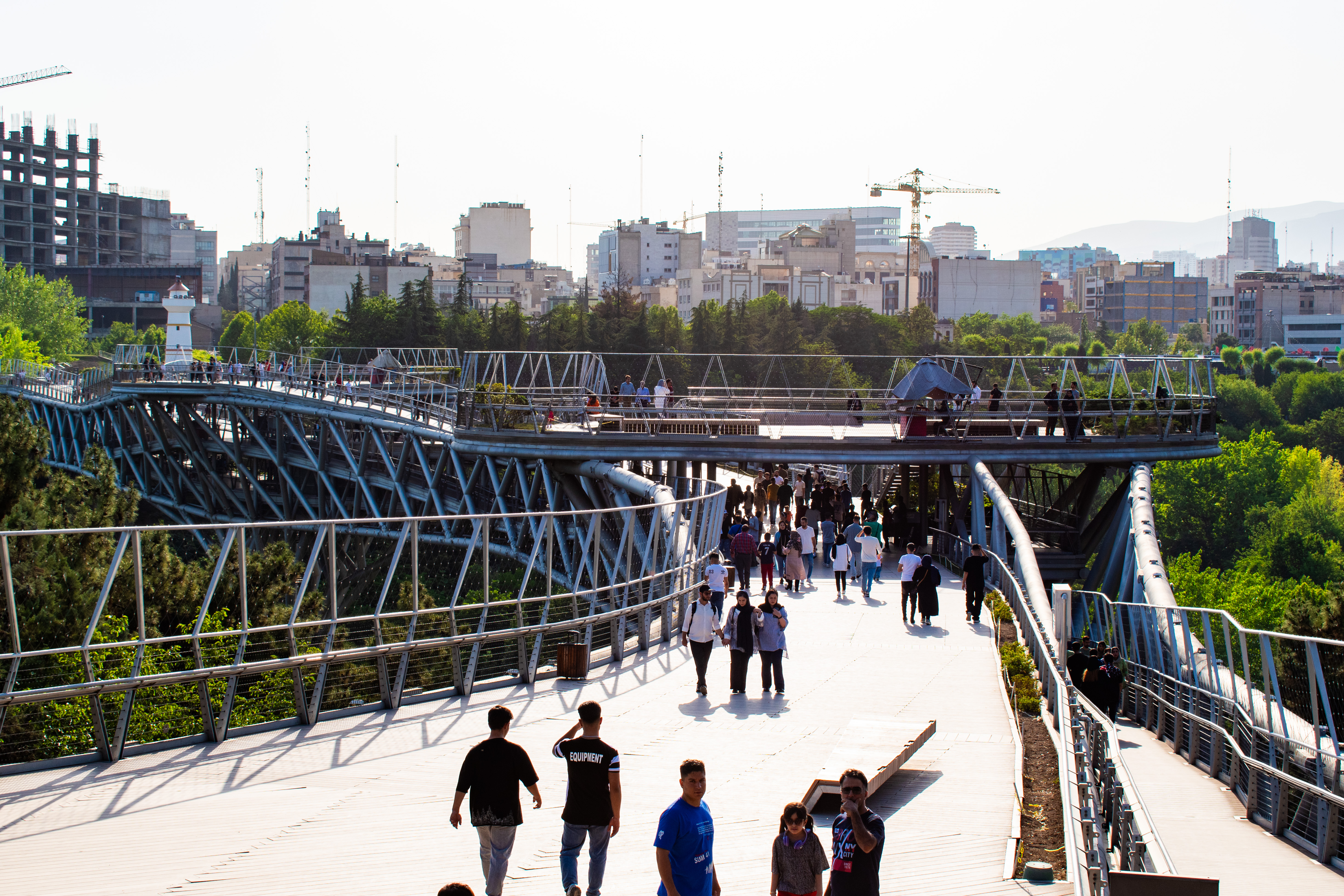
Tabiat Bridge in 2024.

Three tree-shaped columns support two continuous deck levels, which makes the lower level covered and suitable for use in all seasons. A third level is located where the truss meets the column branches. The complex steel structure has a dynamic three-dimensional truss^{^{[1]}} and the surface is curved with a varying width. Structural elements of the bridge use a latent geometrical order rotated and repeated in all three dimensions.

Restaurants serve customers at either end of the bridge with seating areas and kiosks between. Some areas of the bridge are open to allow trees to grow and the bridge itself has green spaces to encourage visitors to linger. The bridge offers viewing areas for scenery without itself blocking the view of the Alborz mountains and has a small footprint that blends in with its environment.

Each of the two parks that the bridge connects has multiple pathways leading visitors onto the bridge.

== Gathering Place ==
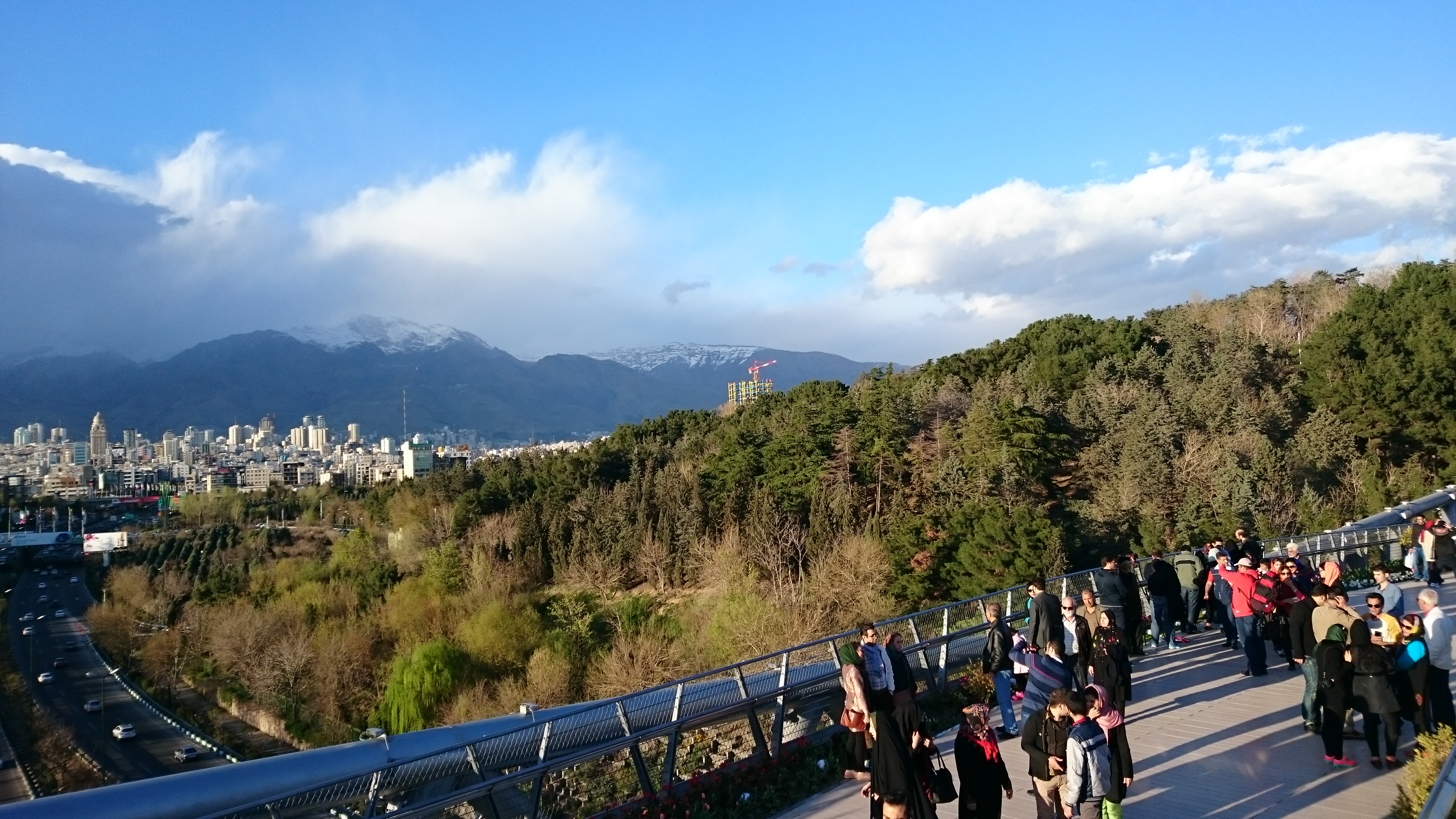
Tabiat Bridge in 2015

The bridge not only connects two parks, it is a popular gathering place for the community in its seating areas and restaurants, acting as a place for people to stay not just pass. Some have described walking on the bridge as feeling like walking through a forest and a place of positive energy where they can come to reenergize when feeling low. Four million people visited the bridge the first year it was open.

== See also ==
- Ab-o-Atash Park
