= Arab Idol season 2 =

Arab Idol
- Season 2

Release
- Original network: MBC 1
- Original release: 8 March – 22 June 2013

Season chronology
- ← Previous; Season 1 Next → Season 3

Following the huge success of the first season of Arab Idol, MBC launched the second season on 8 March 2013. The jury panel, composed of Ahlam, Ragheb Alama and Hassan El Shafei, is completed by Lebanese pop star Nancy Ajram. The top 27 was announced on 6 April 2013 and the first prime is scheduled for 19 April. 13 contestants should reach the final stage, compared with the first season where only 10 contestants were picked. On finale night, Mohammed Assaf from Palestine won the competition against Ahmad Gamal and Farah Youssef. There was an estimated 60 million votes. media and was welcomed with joy by Palestinians and the rest of the Arab world. This year was a premiere since it will be the first time that there is a non-Arab/non-Arabic speaker contestant (Parwas Hussain, from the Kurdish part of Iraq).

== Auditions ==
Ten dates were set for the auditions, which took place in 8 Arab countries (three audition dates in three different Egyptian cities).

- Luxor, Egypt, October 11, 2012
- Alexandria, Egypt, October 15, 2012
- Cairo, Egypt, October 19, 2012
- Casablanca, Morocco, October 28, 2012
- Tunis, Tunisia, November 2, 2012
- Amman, Jordan, November 8, 2012
- Erbil, Iraq, November 11, 2012
- Dubai, United Arab Emirates, November 15, 2012
- Beirut, Lebanon, November 19, 2012
- Doha, Qatar auditions were originally scheduled for November 15, 2012, but the city was excluded after the citizens of Qatar made a campaign on the internet to prevent the arrival of the show crew, in the excuse that the show doesn't align with the habits and traditions of the conservative Qatari community and the Islamic values.

== Second round ==
After more than 15,000 auditions, the judges picked 95 to go onto the following round in Beirut, Lebanon. The second round of auditions consisted of three parts, the first of which saw candidates sing a song of their choice for 60 seconds in front of the panel in groups of 10. Only 61 made it through to the second part of the second round. In this part of the competition, candidates were split into 11 groups of 5 or 6, and had to perform iconic Arabic songs from movies and plays from the previous century. The repertoire consisted of the following songs :

For the girls:

- "Mali" (by Warda Al-Jazairia) from the movie "Sawt El Hob" (1973)
- "El Ward Gamil" (by Umm Kulthum) from the movie "Fatmah" (1947)
- "Rajain Ya Hawa" (by Fairuz), from the Rahbani Brothers's play "Loulou" (1974)
- "Ya Wad Ya Teel" (by Souad Hosni) from the movie "Khali Balak Min Zouzou" (1972)
- "Imta Hataaraf/ Layali El Ouns" (by Asmahan) from the movie "Gharam wa Intiqam" (1944)

For the guys:

- "Ya Msafer Wahdak" (by Mohammed Abdelwahab), from the movie "Mamno' El Hob" (1942)
- "Gana El Hawa" (by Abdelhalim Hafez), from the movie "Abi Foq El Shagara" (1969)
- "Gharibeyn Ou Layl" (by Ghassan Saliba), from the Rahbani Brothers' play "Saif 840" (1987)
- "Gabbar" (by Abdelhalim Hafez), from the movie "Maabodat El Gamahir" (1963)
- "Habeena" (by Farid El Atrash), from the movie "Nagham Fi Hayati" (1975)
- "Ana Elli Alayki Mishta'" (by Joseph Sakr), from Ziad Rahbani's play "Nazl El Sourour" (1974)

After further cuts, only 46 contenders remained, and moved onto the third and final part of the second round of auditions. The remaining competitors had to sing for their lives, of whom only 20 were to be chosen. However, this task proved to be too hard for the judges because of the great talent present. Thus, 27 contestants were hand-picked instead of 20 for the public vote, who had to choose only 12 of them to reach the final round of competitions.

The 27 contestants representing 10 Arab countries were revealed on April 6, 2013, and they are :

From Egypt: Karim Houssam (18), Sabrine El Nagily (20), Mirna Hisham (15), Ahmad Gamal (24), Haidy Moussa (19), Meriem Mohammad (16), Nourhane El Boghdadi (23)
From Morocco: Fatima-Zahra El Qortoubi (27), Salma Rachid (18), Omar El Idrissi (24), Jamal Abbad (25), Yousra Saouf (20)
From Tunisia: Mohammed Dughman (24), Zouhour El Shaari (23), and Mohammed Amer (26)
From Syria: Farah Youssef (21), Abdelkarim Hamdan (25)
From Iraq: Parwas Hussain (24), Oussama Naji (23), Mohannad Almarsoumi (27)
From Lebanon: Ziad Khouri (24), Wael Said (18)
From Saudi Arabia: Ibrahim Abdallah (25), Fares El Madani (27)
From Algeria: Saad Nizar (28)
From Bahrain: Hanane Reda (21)
From Palestine: Mohammed Assaf (23)

== Semi-final ==
Top 15 Males			Top 12 Females		
Contestant	Song Choice	Result	Contestant	Song Choice	Result
Ahmad Gamal	Mawaoud – Abdel Halim Hafez	Advanced	Mirna Hisham	Ma Taatazirsh – Sherine	
Oussama Naji	Fog El Nakhl – Nazem Al Ghazali		Yousra Saouf	Oyoun El Alb – Nagat Al Saghira	Wild Card
Mohammed Ammar	Yalli Taabna Sineen Fi Hawa – George Wassouf		Zouhour El Shahri	El Asami – Thekra	
Wael Said	Sayyajna Lebnan – Wadih El Safi	Wild Card	Heidi Moussa	Lola Al Malama – Warda Al-Jazairia	
Omar El Idrissi	Balash Tbousni – Mohammed Abdel Wahab		Hanane Reda	Galo Habaybak Msafer – Thekra	Wild Card
Karim Houssam	Al Dounia alametni – Wael Jassar		Sabrine El Nagily	Arouh Limeen – Umm Kulthum	Advanced
Fares El Madani	Ya Ghali Elathman – Mohammed Abdu	Wild Card	Parwas Hussain	Kurdish version of Qaduka Almayas – Sabah Fakhri	Advanced
Saad Nizar	C'est La Vie – Cheb Khaled		Meriem Mohammed	Yamma Alamar al Bab – Fayza Ahmed	
Mohammad Assaf	Ya Sghiri – Melhem Zein	Advanced	Salma Rachid	Zaman El Samt – Talal Maddah	Wild Card
Ibrahim Abdallah	La Toudayekoun El Tarf – Mohammed Abdu		Nourhane El Boghdadi	Hayati – Assala Nasri	
Ziad Khouri	Ya'bni – Wadih El Safi, Khatarna Ala Balak – Tony Hanna	Advanced	Fatima El Qortoubi	Byahsidouni Aleh- Nawal El Kuwaitia	
Mohammed Daghman	Aaz El Habayeb – Saber Rebaï		Farah Youssef	Madam Tihibb Bitinkr Leih – Umm Kulthum	Advanced
Abdelkarim Hamdan	Qaduka Almayas – Sabah Fakhri	Advanced			
Mohanad Almarsoumi	Talaa Men Beit Abouha – Nazem Al Ghazali	Advanced			
Jamal Abbad	Ibaatli Jawab – Sabah Fakhri				

== Top 13 Elimination chart ==
Female	Male	Wild Card	Top 13	Winner

Safe	Safe First	Safe Last	Eliminated	Judges' Save

Stage:		Semi Finals	Finals								
Week:		Apr 19–20	Apr 27	May 4	May 11	May 18	May 25	Jun 1	Jun 8	Jun 15	Jun 22
Place	Contestant	Result									
1	Mohammed Assaf	Top 13									Winner
2–3	Ahmad Gamal	Top 13						Bottom 3			Runner-up
2–3	Farah Youssef	Top 13									Runner-up
4	Ziad Khouri	Top 13					Bottom 3	Bottom 3	Bottom 3	Eliminated	
5–6	Salma Rachid	Wild Card		Bottom 4					Eliminated		
5–6	Parwas Hussain	Top 13				Bottom 4			Eliminated		
7	Abdelkarim Hamdan	Top 13			Bottom 3	Bottom 4	Bottom 3	Eliminated			
8	Mohanad Almarsoumi	Top 13		Bottom 4			Eliminated				
9–10	Yousra Saouf	Wild Card			Bottom 3	Eliminated					
9–10	Fares El Madani	Wild Card			Saved	Eliminated					
11–12	Sabrine El Nagily	Top 13	Bottom 3	Eliminated							
11–12	Hanane Reda	Wild Card	Bottom 2	Eliminated							
13	Wael Said	Wild Card	Eliminated								

== Repertoire ==
Week 1 (April 26, 2013)
Guest/Mentor: Nawal El Kuwaitia

Mohammed Assaf	Aala Hisb Oudad – Abdelhalim Hafez
Salma Rachid	Lazraalak Bostan Worood – Fouad Ghazi
Mohanad Almarsoumi	Bayn Edaya – Majid Al Muhandis
Hanane Reda	Wa Hayati Aandek – Thekra
Farah Youssef	Helm – Umm Kulthum
Wael Said	Ma Aad Baddiyak – Melhem Zein
Fares El Madani	Yaben Esshoug – Abadi Al Johar
Ahmad Gamal	Younis – Mohammed Mounir
Sabrine El Nagily	Kahil El Ain – Asma Lamnawar
Parwas Hussein	Magadir – Talal Maddah
Abdelkarim Hamdan	Salam Aaliha Ya Hawa – Melhem Barakat
Yousra Saouf	El Amaken – Mohammed Abdo
Ziad Khouri	Deggou El Mahabij – Fairouz

Week 2 (May 3, 2013)
Guest/Mentor: Samira Said

Farah Youssef	Habina wa Thabina – Mayada El Henawi
Mohanad Almarsoumi	Law wa Lawl wa Lowa – Saadoun Jaber
Salma Rachid	Aal Bal – Samira Said
Abdelkarim Hamdan	Aala Rimsh Ayounha – Wadih El Safi
Yousra Saouf	Elli Kan – Nancy Ajram
Fares El Madani	Ma Aad Badri – Mohammed Abdo
Hanane Reda	Ahebak Moot – Ahlam
Ziad Khouri	Yalli Bi Jamalak – Saber Rebaï
Mohammed Assaf	Ya Reit – Ragheb Alama
Sabrine El Nagily	Elli Lamooni – Thekra
Ahmad Gamal	Imta El Zaman – Mohammed Abdel Wahab
Parwas Hussein	Nergiz – Tipa Duhok / Aal Ain Mouliyatin – Samira Tawfik

Week 3 (May 10, 2013)
Guest/Mentor: Ramy Ayach

Ahmad Gamal	Misheet Khalas – Wael Jassar
Ziad Khouri	Ana Ya Tayr Dayaani Nasseebi – Fouad Salem
Parwas Hussain	Shloonek Eini Shloonek – Salah Abdelghafour
Salma Rachid	Li Saber Houdoud – Umm Kulthum
Fares El Madani	Million Khater – Abdelmajeed Abdullah
Mohammed Assaf	Gatalouni Oyoun Essoud – Wadih El Safi
Mohanad Almarsoumi	Eni Khayartouki – Kadhem Al Saher
Farah Youssef	La Ashad Hobak – Najwa Karam
Yousra Saouf	In Raht Minek Ya Ain – Shadia
Abdelkarim Hamdan	Ya Mal El Sham – Sabah Fakhri

Week 4 (May 17, 2013)
Guest/Mentor: Nawal El-Zoughby

Parwas Hussain	Ahebak – Samira Tawfik
Yousra Saouf	Ana Albi Lek Meyal – Fayza Ahmed
Ziad Khouri	Zaraanaha Galoub – Wadih El Safi
Abdelkarim Hamdan	Elli Nisak Insak – Abdallah Al Rowaished
Salma Rachid	Zay El Assal – Sabah
Mohanad Almarsoumi	Inta Aala Bali – Iraqi folklore
Ahmad Gamal	Rouh – Fadel Shaker
Fares El Madani	Ouli Aamalak Eih – Mohammed Abdel Wahab
Farah Youssef	Lagetak – Issam Rajji
Mohammed Assaf	El Zina Labsat Khalkhalaha – Samir Yazbek

Week 5 (May 24, 2013)
Guest/Mentor: Mohammed Mounir

Salma Rachid	Ana Baasha'ak – Mayada El Henawi
Mohanad Almarsoumi	Goul Ya Helo – Nazem Al Ghazali
Parwas Hussein	Baeed Aanak – Umm Kulthum
Abdelkarim Hamdan	Aal Tayer – Saber Rebaï
Ziad Khouri	Wala Mara – Melhem Barakat
Mohammed Assaf	Aanabi – Karem Mahmoud
Farah Youssef	Ehsas Jdeed – Nancy Ajram
Ahmad Gamal	Sawah – Abdelhalim Hafez

Week 6 (May 31, 2013)
Guest/Mentor: Cheb Khaled

Ziad Khouri	Lahjour Gassrak – George Wassouf
Abdelkarim Hamdan	Aala Aagig – Sabah Fakhri
Farah Youssef	Awedak – Souad Mohammed
Ahmad Gamal	Albi Aasha'ha – Ragheb Alama
Parwas Hussein	Wa Baad Kentom – Mohammed Abdo
Mohammed Assaf	Ya Tayr Ya Tayer – Mohammed Mounir
Salma Rachid	Katar Kheiry – Sherine

Week 7 (June 7, 2013)
Guest/Mentor: Diana Haddad

Farah Youssef	Ya Bidii El Ward – Asmahan
Mohammed Assaf	Sawt El Heda – Assi El Helani
Salma Rachid	Nawilak Aala Niya – Ahlam
Parwas Hussein	Saalouni Ennas – Fairuz
Ziad Khouri	Mamnounak Ana – Melhem Zein
Ahmad Gamal	Wahiyatek Ya Habibi – Sayed Mekawy

Week 8 (June 14, 2013)
Guest/Mentor: Sherine

Farah Youssef	Eatazalt El Gharam – Majida El Roumi	El Oyoun Essoud – Warda Al-Jazairia
Ahmad Gamal	Wahashtini Oyounak – Ahmad Saad	Amana Aalik – Karem Mahmoud
Ziad Khouri	Ramshet Ain – Wadih El Safi	Garahona – George Wassouf
Mohammed Assaf	Kol Da Kan Leih – Mohammed Abdel Wahab	Nemshi wa Nemshi – Saber Rebaï

Week 9 (June 21, 2013)
Guest/Mentor: Assi El Helani

Ahmad Gamal	Ala Nar – Saber Rebaï	Fagdatek – Hussain Al Jasmi	Ahlef Bi Samaha wa Torabha – Abdelhalim Hafez
Farah Youssef	Qodoud El Halabiya – Syrian folklore	Gallaw Tari – Abadi Al Johar	Baktob Ismek Ya Bladi – Joseph Azar
Mohammed Assaf	Ya Ain Ala Saber – Wadih El Safi	Lena Allah – Mohammed Abdu	Aali El Kuffiyeh – Palestinian folklore
