= Arab Idol season 1 =

Arab Idol
- Season 1

Release
- Original network: MBC 1
- Original release: 9 December 2011 – 23 March 2012

Season chronology
- Next → Season 2

The first season of Arab Idol was launched on MBC 1 on 9 December 2011. MBC decided to launch a more stylish version of Pop Idol after the 5 seasons of Super Star, the previous Arabic license of the show. The season was presented by Lebanese model Annabella Hilal and Kuwaiti actor Abdallah Tulehi. The judging panel consisted of Lebanese singer Ragheb Alama, Emirati diva Ahlam and Egyptian music producer, record producer and musician Hassan El Shafei. On finale night, 24 March 2012, Carmen Suleiman from Egypt was crowned the winner of the first season of Arab Idol in a tough competition against Dounia Batma from Morocco. The high ranking of this first season encouraged MBC to launch a second season in 2013.

== Auditions ==
In July 2011, the following audition cities were revealed on the official MBC 1 website, and in August the dates were revealed.

- Cairo, Egypt, 4 September 2011
- Casablanca, Morocco, 8 September 2011
- Dubai, United Arab Emirates, 15 September 2011
- Kuwait City, Kuwait, 19 September 2011
- Amman, Jordan, 26 September 2011
- London, UK, 1 October 2011
- Tunis, Tunisia, 5 October 2011
- Beirut, Lebanon, 14 October 2011
- Damascus, Syria auditions were originally scheduled for 26 September 2011, but the city was excluded after political unrest in the country.

== Top 20 ==
On 13 January 2012, the hand-picked Top 20 was revealed. Representing 9 Arab countries were:

From Egypt: Carmen Suleiman (17), Yahya Yacoub (27), Rasha Sharnoubi (22), Shaza Youssef (17), Karim Mohammad (24)
From Tunisia: Hassan Kharbech (23), Ghofran Fatouhi (19), Shirine Ljmi (16), Amin Bourguiba (17)
From Morocco: Dounia Batma (20), Imane Karkibou (23), Habiba Bouziri (23)
From Jordan: Youssef Arafat (18), Ghazal Shashaah (23)
From Saudi Arabia: Mohamed Taher (23), Marwan Fagui (24)
From Iraq: Mohammad Oulwan (20)
From Oman: Mahmoud Noufli (21)
From Palestine: Ahmad Abbasi (25)
From Syria: Nadia Manfoukh (28)

Top 10 Females		Top 10 Males	
Carmen Suleiman	Meen Da Elli Nseek – Nancy Ajram	Ahmed Abassi	Wala Marra – Melhem Barakat
Dounia Batma	Magadir – Talal Maddah	Amine Bourguiba	Elly Nissak – Abdallah Al Rowaished
Ghazal Shashaah	Ah Ya Ainy Ya Leil – Loai	Hassan Kharbech	Ya Rait – Ragheb Alama
Ghofran Fatouhi	El Assami – Thekra	Karim Mohammad	Ya Bahr Al Nile – Diab
Habiba Bouziri	Deggou El Mahabej – Fairuz	Mahmoud Noufli	Mata Mata – Hussain Al Jasmi
Imane Karkibou	Harramt Ahebak – Warda Al-Jazairia	Marwan Fagui	Zaman Al Samt – Talal Maddah
Nadia Manfoukh	Aal Nadda Annada – Sabah	Mohamed Oulwan	Taala Min Beit Abuha – Nazem Al Ghazali
Rasha Sharnoubi	Mesh Ayza Gherak Enta – Sherine	Mohamed Taher	Metghayer Alai – Abdel Majeed Abdallah
Shaza Youssef	Kattar Khayre – Sherine	Yahya Yacoub	Wallah – Ziad Bourji
Shirine Ljmi	Ma Room – Yara	Youssef Arafat	Aala Babi Waaef Amarain – Melhem Barakat

== Top 10 ==
Contestants		28 Jan	4 Feb	11 Feb	18 Feb	25 Feb	3 Mar	10 Mar	17 Mar	24 Mar
1	Carmen Suleiman						Btm 2	Btm 2		Winner
2	Dounia Batma									Runner-up
3	Youssef Arafat				Btm 3				Elim	
4	Nadia Manfoukh			Btm 3	Btm 2	Btm 3		Elim		
5	Mohammed Taher					Btm 2	Elim			
6	Hassan Kharbech			Btm 3		Elim				
7	Ghofran Fatouhi	Btm 3	Btm 2		Elim					
8	Mohammed Oulwan		Btm 3	Elim						
9	Sherine Lejmi	Btm 2	Elim							
10	Yahya Yacoub	Elim								

== Repertoire ==
Week 1 (27 January 2012)
Guest/Mentor: Saber Rebaï

Hassan Kharbech	Bataabni Aala Kelma – George Wassouf
Yahya Yacoub	Allah A'ala El Dounya – Saber Rebaï
Mohammad Oulwan	Bahlam Beek – Abdelhalim Hafez
Ghofran Fatouhi	E'z El Habayeb – Saber Rebaï
Dounia Batma	Youm Aleik – Thekra
Shirine Ljmi	Barsha – Saber Rebaï
Youssef Arafat	La Tashkki Feyeh – Melhem Zein
Mohamed Taher	Sidi Mansour – Saber Rebaï
Nadia Manfoukh	3al Tayer – Saber Rebaï
Carmen Suleiman	Ana Fintizarak – Umm Kulthum

Week 2 (3 February 2012)
Guest/Mentor: Sherine

Mohammad Oulwan	Ha Habibi – Kadim Al Sahir
Nadia Manfoukh	Debna A Ghyabak – George Wassouf
Shirine Ljmi	Aala Bali – Sherine
Mohamed Taher	Tihagag Mounaya – Rashed Al-Majed
Carmen Suleiman	Ibaad (Leila Leila) – Mohammed Abdu
Hassan Kharbech	El Nas El Rayaa – Rami Ayach
Ghofran Fatouhi	Aala Bali – Adam
Dounia Batma	Daret El Ayam – Umm Kulthum
Youssef Arafat	Andak Bahriya – Wadih El Safi

Week 3 (10 February 2012)
Guest/Mentor: Assi El Helani

Carmen Suleiman	Zay El Assal – Sabah (singer)
Youssef Arafat	Donya El Walah – Abdallah Al Rowaished
Nadia Manfoukh	Ya Msafer Wahdak – Mohammed Abdel Wahab
Mohamed Taher	Awel Marra – Abdel Halim Hafez
Dounia Batma	Lashhad Hobak – Najwa Karam
Mohammad Oulwan	Reddou Habibi – Melhem Zein
Hassan Kharbech	Leila – Abdel Rab Idris
Ghofran Fatouhi	El Ayoun El Soud – Warda Al-Jazairia

Week 4 (17 February 2012)
Guest/Mentor: Majid Al Muhandis

Hassan Kharbech	Aa Hadeer Elbosta – Fairouz
Dounia Batma	Habina wa Thabina – Mayada Al Henawy
Nadia Manfoukh	Abeek – Abdallah Al Rowaished
Carmen Suleiman	Mathasibneesh – Sherine
Ghofran Fatouhi	Lamma Rah Alsabr Minno – Sharifa Fadel
Mohamed Taher	Moo Aala Kefak – Majid Al Muhandis
Youssef Arafat	Misheet Khalas – Wael Jassar

Week 5 (24 February 2012)
Guest/Mentor: Nawal Al Zoghbi

Youssef Arafat	Khatarna Aala Balak – Tony Hanna
Hassan Kharbech & Carmen Suleiman	Ya Rab – Marwan Khoury & Carole Samaha
Mohamed Taher	Sammi – Mohammed Abdu
Youssef Arafat & Nadia Manfoukh	Mas Wa Louli – Cheb Khaled & Diana Haddad
Hassan Kharbech	Law Aala Albi – Fadl Shaker
Carmen Suleiman	Seedi Wesalak – Angham
Mohamed Taher & Dounia Batma	Khayna – Rashed Al-Majed & Asma Lamnawar
Nadia Manfoukh	Medley – Samira Tawfiq
Dounia Batma	Akthar Min Awal – Ahlam

Week 6 (2 March 2012)
Guest/Mentor: Elissa (singer)

Mohamed Taher	Sahran Maak Elleila – Ahmed El-Sharif	Wainak Habibi – Rashed Al-Majed
Carmen Suleiman	Mostaheel – Warda Al-Jazairia	La Tebki Ya Worood El Dar – Najwa Karam
Nadia Manfoukh	Aahd Allah – Melhem Barakat	Lazraalak Bostan Worood – Fouad Ghazi
Youssef Arafat	Kel El Asayed – Marwan Khoury	Reda Wallah Wa Radeinak – Talal Salama
Dounia Batma	Olli Aamallak Eh Albi – Mohammed Abdel Wahab	Aal Bal – Samira Said

Week 7 (9 March 2012)
Guest/Mentor: Kadim Al Sahir

Dounia Batma	Ma Aad Badri – Mohammed Abdu	Akthar – Asala Nasri
Youssef Arafat	Aala Remsh E'younha – Wadih El Safi	Omry Killo – Wael Kfoury
Carmen Suleiman	Ya Mounyati – Abdelmohsen Almohanna	Adwaa El Shohra – Carole Samaha
Nadia Manfoukh	Emmi Namet Aa Bakkir – Fairuz	Wahashtini – Souad Mohammad

Week 8 (16 March 2012)
Guest/Mentor: Nancy Ajram

Youssef Arafat	Lalhin Ahebha – Nabil Shoail	La Trouhi – Joseph Attieh	Alli Gara – Oulaya
Carmen Suleiman	Albi Dalili – Laila Mourad	Ma Yhimmak – Yara	Alhin Ahebak – Thekra
Dounia Batma	Mali – Warda Al-Jazairia	Wagif Aala Babikom – Naima Samih	Tashakurat – Fulla

Week 9 (23 March 2012)
Guest/Mentor: Najwa Karam / Latifa (singer)

Carmen Suleiman	Wallah Oyonak – Samira Said	Enta Omri – Umm Kulthum	El Rasayel – Mohamed Abdu
Dounia Batma	Ebtaed Anni – Talal Maddah	Marsoul El Hob – Abdelwahab Doukkali	Hob Eh – Umm Kulthum
