= Shaklak Mish Ghareeb =

2014 Arabic TV series or program

- Genre: Reality television
- Presented by: Tony Abou Jaoudeh
- Judges: Haifa Wehbe; Hakim; Mohammed Sami
- Country of origin: Arab World
- Original language: Arabic
- No. of seasons: 1

Production
- Running time: Varies

Original release
- Network: MBC 1 Wanasah TV
- Release: 19 April – 21 June 2014

Shaklak Mish Ghareeb (Arabic: شكلك مش غريب) is an Arabic television show based on the show Your Face Sounds Familiar. The first season premiered on 19 April 2014 on MBC 1 and Wanasah TV.

== Season 1 ==
The judges on the show included

- Haifa Wehbe - Singer
- Hakim - Singer
- Mohammed Sami - Film and TV Director

And the show is presented by Lebanese comedian Tony Abou Jaoudeh.

The eight celebrity contestants who randomly take on different character transformation challenges every week on the show are:

- Wael Mansour
- Tamer Abdulmonem
- Mais Hamdan
- Bassima
- Khaled Al Shaer
- Abdulmonem Amairy
- Dima Kandalaft
- Jennifer Grout

=== Episodes ===
	episode 1	episode 2	episode 3	episode 4	episode 5	episode 6	episode 7	episode 8	episode 9	the final
Abdulmonem	Kadim Al Sahir	George Wassouf	Farid al-Atrash	Fahd Ballan	Abdul Rabb Idriis	Melhem Barakat	Duraid Lahham (Ghawar Al Toshi)	Abdel Halim Hafez	Saadoon Jaber	Wadih El Safi
Khalid	Khaled	Rabeh Sager	Tamer Hosny	Toni Hanna	Nazem Al-Ghazali	Rashed Al-Majed	Ilham al-Madfai	Lionel Richie	Amitabh Bachchan	Mohamed Mounir
Bassima	Sabah	Edith Piaf	Ricky Martin	Warda Al-Jazairia	Tina Turner	Layla Murad	Taroob	Whitney Houston	Oum Kalthoum	Dalida
Mais	Latifa	Assala Nasri	Samira Said	Nancy Ajram	Angham	Thekra	Diana Haddad	Elissa	Sherihan	Myriam Fares
Dima	Najwa Karam	Soad Hosny	Samira Tewfik	Marilyn Monroe	Dalida	Lady Madonna	Shakira	Nawal Al Zoghbi	Cher	Patricia Kaas
Tamer	Hani Shaker	Amr Diab	Nabil Shuail	Mohammed Abdel Wahab	Mohammad Fouad	Hisham Abbas	Shaaban Abdel Rahim	Walid Toufic	Ragheb Alama	Adel Emam
Wael	PSY	Abdel Halim Hafez	Bahaa Sultan	James Brown	Tarkan	Sayed Mekawy	Andrea Bocelli	Mohammed Abdu	Sabah Fakhri	Assi El Helani With Jennifer Grout-Karol Sakr
Jennifer	Majida El Roumi	Celine Dion	Asmahan	Ahlam	Sherine	Madonna	Shadia	Mayada El Hennawy	Alicia Keys	Karol Sakr With Wael Mansour-Assi El Helani

=== Weekly statistics ===
	Espoide 1	Espoide 2	Espoide 3	Espoide 4	Espoide 5	Espoide 6	Espoide 7	Espoide 8	Espoide 9	Total marks	final
Abdulmonem	sixth	winner	sixth	seventh	fourth	third	fourth	fifth	fourth	fourth	winner
Khaled	seventh	fourth	second	winner	sixth	second	fifth	fourth	third	first	second
Bassima	fifth	second	second	fifth	third	fifth	losser	winner	winner	second	third
Mais Hamdan	second	fifth	winner	losser	second	sixth	fifth	second	second	third	fourth
Dima Kandlaft	Third	Sixth	fourth	third	fifth	Winner	second	losser	fifth	fifth	fifth
Tamer	losser	third	fourth	sixth	winner	sixth	third	seventh	losser	sixth	sixth
Wael	Winner	seventh	losser	second	sixth	fourth	seventh	sixth	losser	seventh	seventh
Jennifer	third	losser	losser	fourth	losser	losser	winner	third	sixth	Eighth	Eighth

=== Weekly assessments ===
	first Espoide	second Espoide	third Espoide	Espoide 4	Espoide 5	Espoide 6	seventh Espoide	Espoide 8	Espoide 9	Total scores	Final
Abdulmonem	25	49	29	17	25	32	31	22	30	260	winner
Khaled	23	26	33	51	21	33	28	27	33	275	second
Bassima	27	37	33	22	27	23	18	50	35	272	third
Mais	30	23	38	13	44	19	21	44	34	266	fourth
Dima	28	20	30	33	23	49	34	15	27	259	fifth
Tamer	21	36	30	20	45	19	33	16	21	244	sixth
Wael	41	18	15	39	21	30	19	20	21	224	seventh
Jennifer	28	14	15	28	17	18	39	29	22	210	Eighth
