= Dounia Batma =

Moroccan actress and singer (born 1991)

- دنيا بطمة
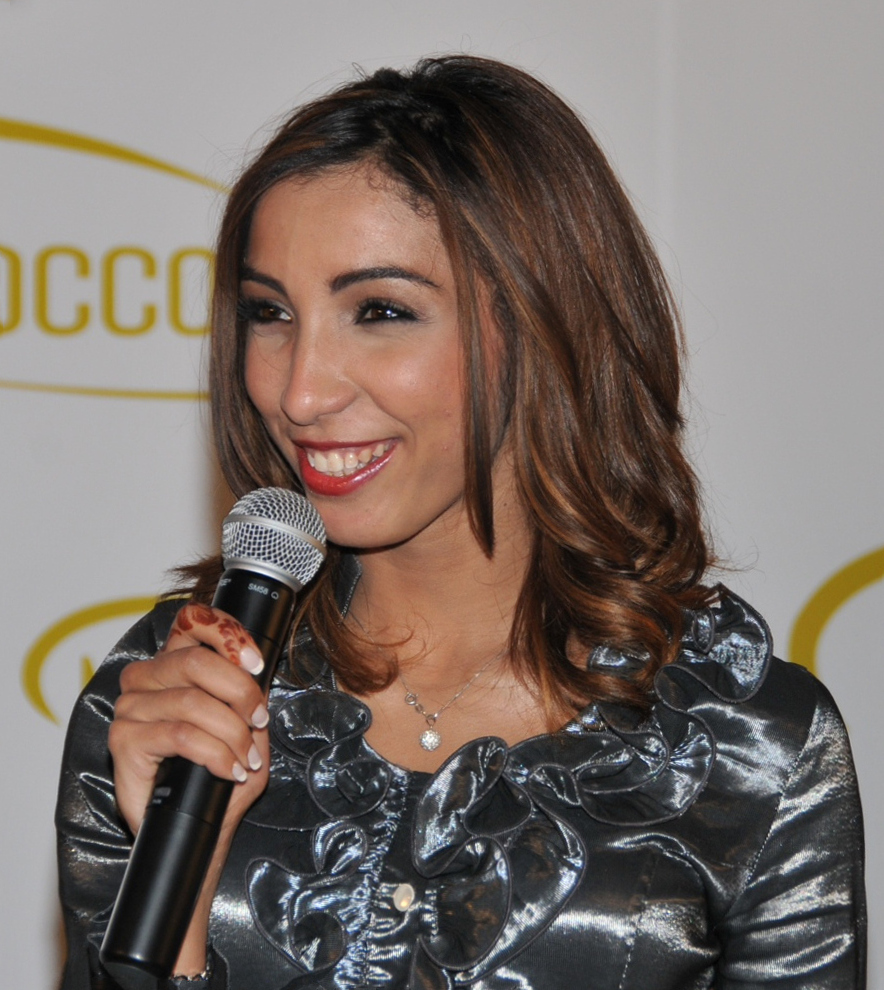
- Batma in 2012
- Born: 1 April 1991 (age 35); Casablanca, Morocco
- Occupations: actress, singer
- Musical career
- Genres: Arab pop, Arabic music, Moroccan music, Moroccan pop, Middle Eastern music, Raï
- Label: Al-Turk Production

Dounia Batma (Arabic: دنيا بطمة; born 1 April 1991) is a Moroccan singer and actress who rose to popularity as the runner-up of the first season of Arab Idol (the Arabic version of Pop Idol) on MBC. She lost the title against Egyptian contestant Carmen Suleiman.

Batma was born and raised in Hay Mohammadi, in the Ain Sebaa-Hay Mohammedi district of Casablanca, Morocco. Her father, Hamid Batma, played for different bands including Mesnawa and Nass El Ghiwane, and her uncle, Laarbi Batma, is the leader of Moroccan fusion group Nass El Ghiwane, considered by Martin Scorsese as "Africa's Rolling Stones". She studied tourism after high-school, without stopping to dream about a musical career. In 2010, at the age of 18, inspired by her already-famous older cousin Khansa Batma (Mohamed Batma's daughter), she took part in a Moroccan musical competition, called Studio 2M, broadcast on 2M TV, in the Oriental category. She sang various songs of both Moroccan and Middle-Eastern repertoires, and reached the semi-finals. She did not reach the final, but managed to release a single "Aalash Tgheeb" (Why are you hiding?) in Moroccan Arabic which didn't become very successful. But she realized that she would need to go further to get the career she was expecting and Arab Idol was a great venue to reach the Arab World's heart.

== Breakthrough ==
On 8 September 2011, Batma auditioned for the Arabic music competition Arab Idol. The show is the pan-Arab version of Pop Idol and a rebirth of Future TV's show SuperStar. The winner of the competition wins a contract with recording label Platinum Records and Chevrolet Corvette (C6) as well as an important advertisement campaign with Pepsi.

She auditioned in Casablanca, and performed La Tfaker (by late Tunisian singer Thekra) in front of the jury composed by Lebanese pop singer Ragheb Alama, Emirati diva Ahlam and Egyptian music producer and musician Hassan Shaf'ei. They invited her to join in, which introduce her to the Arab audience. She was selected in the top 10 against contestants from Tunisia, Syria, Jordan, Saudi Arabia, Iraq and Egypt.

Batma's vocal abilities amazed the members of the jury and made her among the favorites since the very first prime, where she performed Talal Maddah's "Magadir". Her performance was so strong and so intense that it made Ahlam cry out of emotion. She then excelled in various dialects and various styles from classic Egyptian songs (Umm Kulthum, Mohammed Abdel Wahab, Warda, Faiza Ahmed), to Arabic pop music (Samira Said, Fulla, Najwa Karam, Asala Nasri) and Gulf music (Ahlam, Mohammed Abdu, Talal Maddah).

Among her most notable performances were her rendition of Umm Kulthum's Darrat El Ayam, for which she received unanimous praises from the jury and her singing of Ahlam's Akhtar Men Awal Ahebak (in Gulf Arabic), for which Ahlam (the singer of this song and member of the jury) said : "It is an honor that you sung this for me".

On 24 March, she lost the title against the Egyptian contestant Carmen Suleiman.

During a press conference, Batma seized the chance to clarify that her try in the Middle East is due to the opportunities that can be offered there, and added that "the launch of my artistic career from the East won't affect my contribution to the promotion of Moroccan art, and won't also affect my pride of my mother tongue". Many viewers noticed that Batma didn't use her Moroccan Arabic whenever she was speaking in front of the audiences and switched to another Arabic dialect (mostly the Khaliji dialect) as most Moroccan artists usually do when they travel to the Middle East. She considers Asma Lamnawar and Hoda Saad as role models.

After the show, the CEO of Saudi Platinum Records, Rashed Al-Majed, signed her to the label, saying that her voice was "rare".

== Performances in Arab Idol ==
- First casting (Casablanca) : "La Tfaker" by Thekra
- Second casting (Beirut) : "Hob Eih" by Umm Kulthum
- Top 10 Girls : "Magadir" by Talal Maddah
- 1st Prime : "Youm Leek" by Thekra
- 2nd Prime : "Darrat El Ayam" by Umm Kulthum
- 3rd Prime : "Lashhad Hobbak" by Najwa Karam
- 4th Prime : "Habina Wa Thabina" by Mayada El Henawi
- 5th Prime : "Akhtar Min Awal Ahebak" by Ahlam
- 5th Prime : "Khayna" by Rashed Al-Majed and Asma Lamnawar
- 6th Prime : "Olli A'amalak Eh Albi" by Mohammed Abdel Wahab
- 6th Prime : "Aal Bal" by Samira Said
- 7th Prime : "Ma Aad Badri" by Mohammed Abdu
- 7th Prime : "Akthar" by Asala Nasri
- 8th Prime : "Tab Wa Ana Mali" by Warda Al-Jazairia
- 8th Prime : "Wagif Aala Babikom" by Naima Samih
- 8th Prime : "Tashakurat" by Fulla
- Final : "Allah Ya Moulana" by Nass El Ghiwane
- Final : "Ebta'ad Aani" by Talal Maddah
- Final : "Marsoul El Hob" by Abdelwahab Doukkali
- Final : "Hob Eih" by Umm Kulthum

Medleys in Saturday's results show

- 1st Prime's Results : "Yalli Bjamalek" by Saber Rebaï
- 2nd Prime's Results : "Bataminak" by Sherine
- 3rd Prime's Results : "Bab Am Yabki" by Assi El Helani
- 4th Prime's Results : "Bin Edeya" by Majid El Muhandes
- 5th Prime's Results : "Bilba'lak" by Nawal El-Zoughby
- 6th Prime's Results : "Law Taarafo" by Elissa
- 7th Prime's Results : "Zidini Ashqan" by Kadhem Al Saher
- 8th Prime Results : "Akhasmak Ah" and "El Donia Helwa" by Nancy Ajram
- 8th Prime Results : "Sit El Habayeb" by Fayza Ahmed

== Discography ==
Bcharat Khir
Alamtani
Nawyiin Niya
Arqos
Rayora
Mashi Shoghli
Hob Seeni
Omy Daeatly
Mazyan wa3ar
Ya Hbib l9alb
Almarrib marribona
Ah ya9amar
7ob iih
7obak 3asal
Aalach ya rzali
Aayach rarib
Aktar bali ahlam bih
Aktar min awal hobak
Alh ya molana
Alyom abik
Ay thibini
Badri
Bin idiya
Btaminak
Darat layam
Fii tali alil
Hani hani
Ibta3id 3ani
In kont nasi
Kif tahwani
Ma3ad badri
Ma9adir
Maali
Manta raya9
Marsol lhob
Mno hobak
Tachakorat
Tok tji
Waa9if
Wla fakhbaro
