= Carmen Suleiman =

Egyptian singer

Carmen Suleiman كارمن سليمان
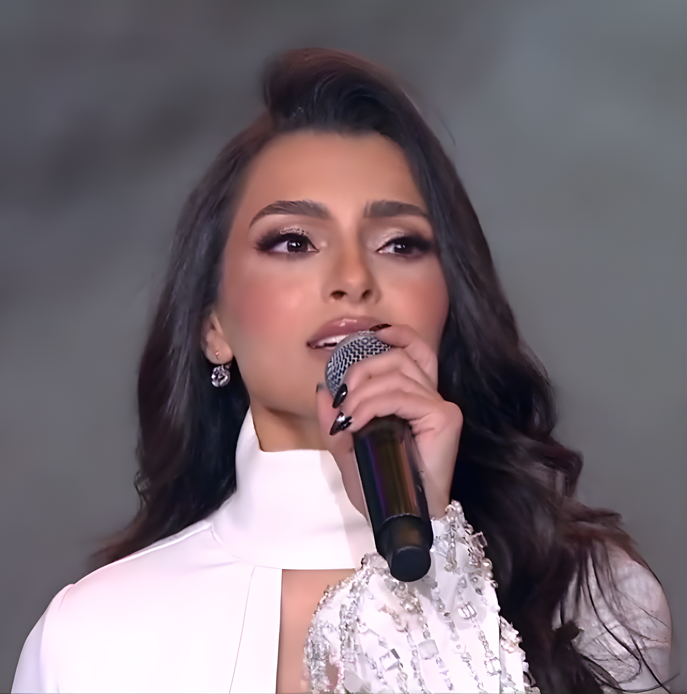
- Carmen Suleiman performing in a live concert (2023)

Background information
- Born: Carmen Essam Soliman كارمن عصام سليمان; 7 October 1994 (age 32); Zagazig, Sharqia, Egypt
- Genre: Pop
- Occupation: Singer
- Instrument: Singing
- Years active: 2012–present
- Label: Platinum Records

Carmen Essam Soliman (Arabic: كارمن عصام سليمان; born on 7 October 1994), better known by her stage name Carmen Suleiman (Arabic: كارمن سليمان), is an Egyptian singer.

== Life and career ==
Soliman won the first season of Arab Idol song contest in 2012 broadcast live on MBC 1, winning a recording contract with Platinum Records. After grueling rounds of televised eliminations, and critical evaluations by celebrity judges Ragheb Alama, Nancy Ajram, Ahlam and Egyptian music producer Hassan El Shafei, Carmen Soliman prevailed against 20 other contestants to become the first winner of the hit series on 24 March 2012 with the highest number of votes. Her first single, "Kalam Kalam" was released on 4 March 2013 jumping to No. 1 on the Egyptian charts, and her first album was released in January 2014. Carmen followed with numerous hit singles, including "Akhbari" and "Azama Ala Azama" a trio with fellow Idol contestants, Dounia Batma and Youssef Arafat.

Carmen released her first single "Kalam Kalam" on 4 March 2013, and did the singing voice of Moana in the Arabic dub.

== Performances in Arab Idol ==
- First casting (Cairo) : "Magadir" by Talal Maddah
- Second casting (Beirut) : "Yana Yana" by Sabah
- Top 10 Girls : "Meen Da Elli Nseek" by Nancy Ajram
- 1st Prime : "Ana Fintizarak" by Umm Kulthum
- 2nd Prime : "Abaad Kontom" by Mohammed Abdu
- 3rd Prime : "Zay El Assal" by Sabah
- 4th Prime : "Mathasibneesh" by Sherine
- 5th Prime : "Seedi Wesalak" by Angham
- 5th Prime : "Ya Rub" by Marwan Khoury and Carole Samaha
- 6th Prime : "Mostaheel" by Warda Al-Jazairia
- 6th Prime : "La Tebki Ya Worood El Dar" by Najwa Karam
- 7th Prime : "Ya Mounyati" by Abdel Mohsen El-Mohanna
- 7th Prime : "Adwaa El Shohra" by Carole Samaha
- 8th Prime : "Ana Albi Dalili" by Laila Mourad
- 8th Prime : "Ma Yhimmak" by Yara
- 8th Prime : "Alhin Ahebak" by Thekra
- 9th Prime : "Bala Hob" by Rouwaida Attieh
- Final : "Wallah Oyonak" by Samira Said
- Final : "Enta Omri" by Umm Kulthum
- Final : "El Rasayel" by Mohamed Abdu
- Final: :"Helwa Ya Baladi" – Dalida

Medleys in Saturdays' results Show

- 1st Prime's Results : "Bebasata" by Saber Rebaï
- 2nd Prime's Results : "Sabri Aleel" by Sherine
- 3rd Prime's Results : "El Hawa Tayer" by Assi El Helani
- 4th Prime's Results : "Ana Bdeera" by Majid al-Muhandis
- 5th Prime's Results : "Sho Akhbarak" by Nawal Al Zoghbi
- 6th Prime's Results : "Abali Habibi" by Elissa
- 7th Prime's Results : "Ala Rasi" by Kadhim Al-Sahir
- 8th Prime Results : "Ebn El Geeran" and "Mashi Haddi" by Nancy Ajram
- 8th Prime Results : "Sit El Habayeb" by Fayza Ahmed
