= Salma Rachid =

Morccan singer (born 1994)

- سلمى رشيد
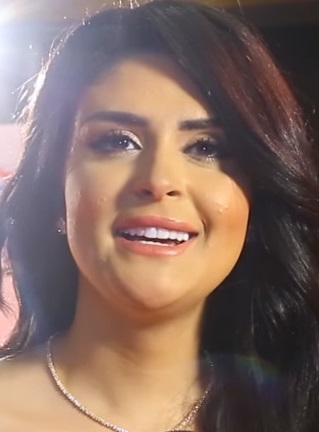
- Rachid in December 2017
- Born: 13 June 1994 (age 32); Casablanca, Morocco
- Occupations: Actress; singer
- Musical career
- Genres: Arab pop, Arab tarab, Moroccan pop, Middle Eastern music, raï
- Label: Humam FM (HFM) Productions

Salma Rachid (Arabic: سلمى رشيد, Moroccan Arabic pronunciation: [ˈsælmæ ɾɑˈʃiːd]; born 13 June 1994) is a Moroccan pop singer and actress who gained fame at the age of 18 following her participation in the second season of Arab Idol, broadcast on MBC. The youngest contestant, she earned fifth place and was praised for the strength of her voice, her ability to master various styles, and her charisma. She was nicknamed El Sultana by her fans and considers Umm Kulthum among her main inspiration.

== Early life ==
Originally from the Tafilalt oasis in south-east Morocco, Salma was born and raised in the Hay Mohammedi neighbourhood of the Ain Sebaa-Hay Mohammedi district of Casablanca. From a very young age, Salma was passionate about music, drawing and fashion. During an interview with MBC, she revealed that she used to steal clothes from her family, tear them apart, and stitch them together to create new outfits. In the same interview, she also said that she had once almost been hit by a car, but her best friend had saved her by losing her own life. Salma graduated from high school in June 2012 with her baccalauréat, after which she enrolled at university to study economics.

== Participation in Arab Idol ==
At the age of 18, Salma decided to take a chance and auditioned for the second season of Arab Idol. The Moroccan audition took place in Casablanca, and Salma performed "Ya Moniyati", a Yemeni song that is extremely popular throughout the Persian Gulf region, in front of the jury panel composed by Arabic superstars Ragheb Alama, Ahlam, Nancy Ajram and Egyptian producer Hassan El Shafei. Salma was then accepted by all of them and flew to Beirut, Lebanon, to pursue the casting process.

She performed then "El Ward Gamil" from Umm Kulthum with five other contestants, than she performed "Awal Marra" by Abdelhalim Hafez and managed to be picked among the 27 finalists who would compete to get into the finale stage. During the first prime, she performed Talal Maddah's classic "Zaman El Samt", but even if the jury was convinced by her beautiful and powerful voice, her interpretation was judged too aggressive. Ahlam nevertheless said that if she just focused a bit more and doesn't get carried away in her performances, she would "break" the Arab world (as being the new Arabic musical sensation). Unfortunately, Salma didn't manage to get enough votes, and she was one of the eight contestants picked by the jury to perform in order to get one of the 4 wildcards. She was picked by Ragheb Alama and performed Umm Kulthum's "Ya Msaharni" for survival. She was eventually saved alongside Bahraini contestant Hanane Reda, which allowed her to finally be part of the thirteen finalists.

Salma performed various songs during the competition, from classic singers such as Sabah, Umm Kulthum, Mayada El Henawi, to folk singer such as Fouad Ghazi or Arabic pop singers like Samira Said or Sherine. What was remarkable about Salma's path is that even if she didn't get enough votes in the beginning, she managed to be in the safe zone most of the time, thanks to her on-growing fanbase. She was acclaimed by the jury and the audience each Friday and even Egyptian superstar Mohammed Mounir told her : "You have something rare in the Arab world : a great voice with a huge charisma". She was contacted by many people from the Arabic music scene who praised her for her voice, such as Syrian singer Rouwaida Attieh and Lebanese lyricist Salim Assaf (who wrote songs for top singers like Carole Samaha, Najwa Karam, Ramy Ayach and who told her he will write her a song) as well as various people from the Moroccan scene.

On the 7th prime, she performed Ahlam's tube "Nawaylak Ala Niya", then sung with Lebanese pop singer Diana Haddad the folk song "Bayn El Assr wa El Maghreb" during a medley dedicated to the star of Bedouin music Samira Tawfik and rended the cult song "Mistaniyak" from Moroccan diva Aziza Jalal with the two other female contestants. On 8 June 2013, she was voted off with Kurdish contestant Parwas Hussein, being ranked 5th. Even if she lost the competition, she was praised by the jury as being the surprise of this edition, and as being a rare voice. According to jury member Hassan El Shafei's Twitter, Salma signed a ten-year contract with Platinum Records, the music recording label affiliated with MBC and directed by Saudi superstar Rashed Al-Majed. She will tour with Ragheb Alama in all his concerts and was chosen with Mohammed Assaf from Palestine, Ahmad Gamal from Egypt and Farah Youssef from Syria to be a part of the contestants who will tour throughout the Arab world.

== Performances in Arab Idol ==
=== Performances during the auditions ===
- Casting (Casablanca): "Ya Monyati" by Abdelmohssen El Mohanad
- Casting Beirut (Group audition): "El Ward Gamil" by Umm Kulthum
- Casting Beirut (Finale audition): "Awal Marrah" by Abdelhalim Hafez

=== Performances during the primes ===
- Top 27: "Zaman El Samt" by Talal Maddah
- Wildcards Survival Prime: "Ya Msaharni" by Umm Kulthum
- 1st Prime: "Lazraalak Boustan Worood" by Fouad Ghazi
- 2nd Prime: "Aal Bal" by Samira Said
- 3rd Prime: "Li Sabr Hdoud" by Umm Kulthum
- 4th Prime: "Zay El Aassal" by Sabah
- 5th Prime: "Ana Baash'ak" by Mayada El Hennawi
- 6th Prime: "Kattar Kheiry" by Sherine
- 7th Prime: "Nawaylak Ala Niya" by Ahlam
