= Yousra Saouf =

Moroccan singer

Yousra Saouf يسرا سعوف
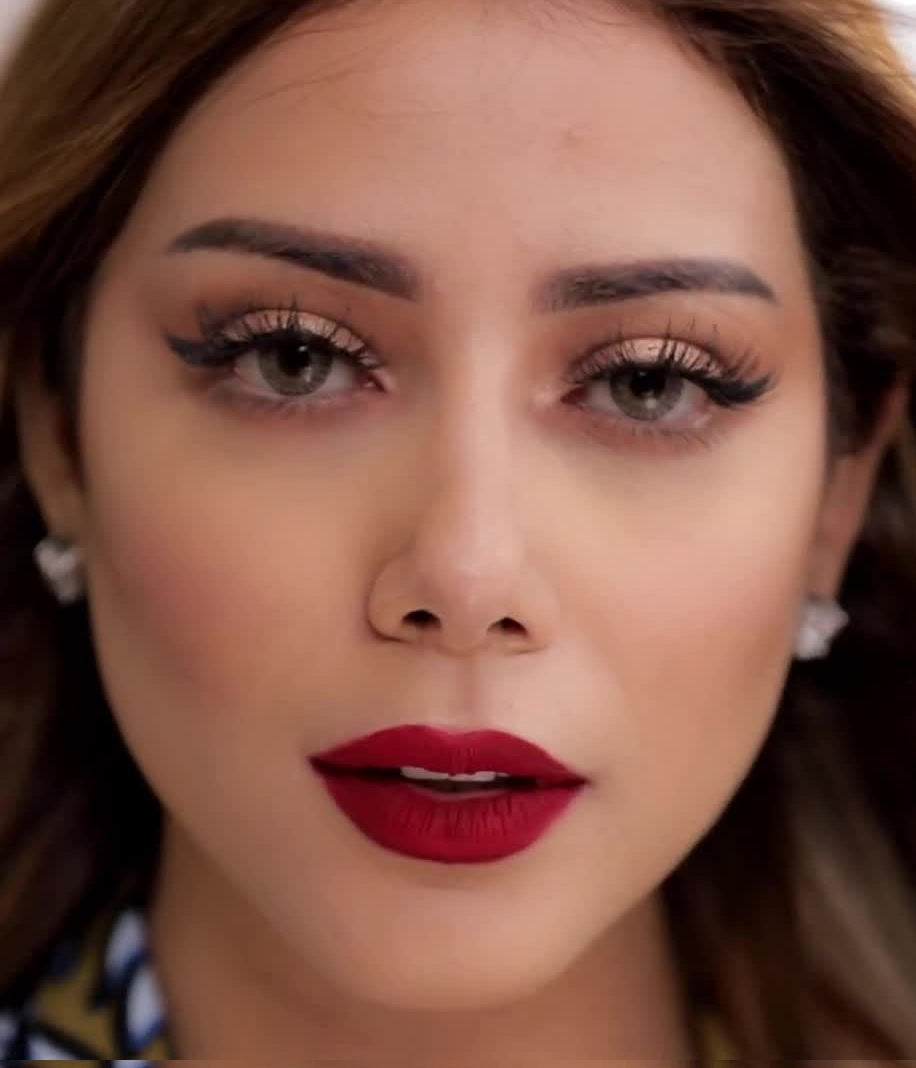
- Saouf in 2019

Background information
- Born: 29 April 1992 (age 34); Casablanca, Morocco
- Genres: Arab pop, Arab tarab, khaleeji, Moroccan pop, Middle Eastern music, raï
- Occupation: Singer

Yousra Saouf (Arabic: يسرا سعوف; born 29 April 1992) is a Moroccan singer who rose to fame in the Arab world at the age of 20 following her participation in the second season of Arab Idol, broadcast on MBC. She was acclaimed by the jury and the public, her voice being linked to the Egyptian diva Najat Essaghira. She was ranked ninth in the competition.

== Early life ==
Yousra Saouf is from Casablanca, Morocco.

== Performances in Arab Idol ==
=== Performances during the auditions ===
- Casting (Casablanca): "Akthar Min Awal Ahebak" by Ahlam
- Casting Beirut (Group audition): "Mali" by Warda Al-Jazairia
- Casting Beirut (Finale audition): "Ana Fintizarak" by Umm Kulthum

=== Performances during the primes ===
- Top 27: "Oyoun El Alb" by Najat Essaghira
- Wildcards Survival Prime: "Ma Thasabnish" by Sherine
- 1st Prime: "El Amaken" by Mohammed Abdu
- 2nd Prime: "Elli Kan" by Nancy Ajram
- 3rd Prime: "In Raht Minek Ya Ain" by Shadia
- 4th Prime: "Ana Albi Lek Meyal" by Fayza Ahmed

== After Arab Idol ==
After leaving the program, Yousra was contacted by the Emirati lyricist Mosaab El Anzi, who, charmed by her voice, wrote her first song "Bghito Yahlali". The song, written in Moroccan Arabic, will be included in an upcoming debut album. Yousra shared the stage with Ahlam during her concert on 30 May 2013 at the Mawazine music festival in Rabat, Morocco. She sang "Akthar Min Awal Ahebak" and "Ma Isah Illa Sahih".
