= Farrah Yousef =

Syrian singer (born 1989)

Farrah Yousef فرح يوسف
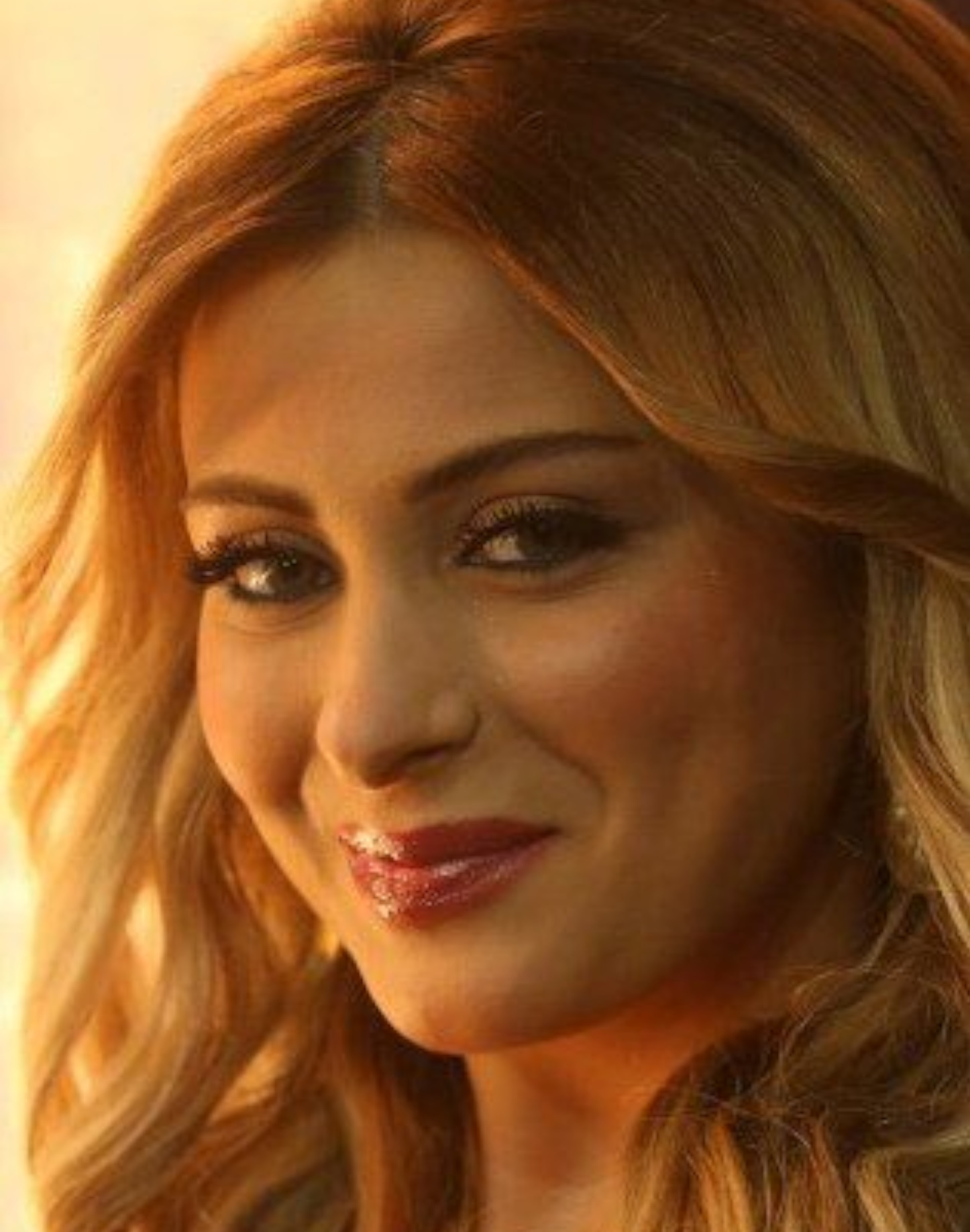

Background information
- Also known as: Farah Youssef, Farah Yousef
- Born: Farrah Mahmoud Yousef فرح محمود يوسف; July 20, 1989 (age 37); Tartus, Syria
- Genres: Pop, country, Arabic pop
- Instruments: Cello, oud
- Label: Platinum Records
- Website: www.farrahyousef.com

Farrah Yousef (Arabic: فرح يوسف; born July 20, 1989) is a Syrian singer who was the first runner-up on the second season of the television program Arab Idol in 2013.

== Biography ==
=== Early life and early career ===
Farrah Yousef was born on July 20, 1989, in Tartus, a city on the Mediterranean coast of Syria. Her first performance on stage was at the age of seven at the Abu Dhabi Cultural Center, where she sang "Sit Al Hbayib" in the presence of a large crowd of diplomats and the presence of Sheikh Zayed's wife Sheikha Fatima. Farrah won the applause of the audience, and since then she has aspired to become an artist.

After graduation from high school, Farrah gained a scholarship to study medicine in Italy, where she gained experience in western styles of singing and learned to sing in English, French and Italian. In 2011 Yousef had the chance to perform the theme song of a Syrian series, "Wilada Mina Al Khassira". In 2012 she performed the theme song for two series, "Bet Amer" and "Al Amemy".

=== Arab Idol ===
Following the success of the first season of Arab Idol, MBC launched the second season on March 8, 2013. Back in Syria, the civil war was affecting the whole country, resulting in Yousef being hesitant to audition. She was encouraged by her friends and family to achieve her dream. She said that watching the program inspired her to give it a try. She almost failed to leave Syria as her car was caught in the middle of a shootout as she left Damascus to audition in Beirut.

Television viewers first saw Yousef during the audition episodes at the beginning of Arab Idol's second season. The show's judges included Ragheb Alama, Nancy Ajram, Ahlam and Hassan El Shafei. Farrah performed "Ifrah Ya Albi" by Umm Kulthum and got accepted to the next round. In Beirut, where the competition was held, outdoor cafes put up big screens and the sound of Yousef's voice drifted down streets.

Yousef said her performance mirrored the way she feels when singing on stage when she often thinks of her family. She has said that she feels a sense of responsibility to the audience and that there is always that deep happiness mixed with fear. She says that she tries to make people love one another again using the healing power of music. Yousef performed many kinds of music during the competition, including Arabic pop songs and Classic songs by great Arabic singers like Umm Kulthum, Fairuz, Asmahan and Najwa Karam, and also Someone Like You by Adele.

=== Songs ===
Farrah Yousef -Songs
Year	Song name	Link
2019	Please	Farrah Yousef - Please
2018	El Hekaya	Farrah Yousef - El Hekaya
2018	Mako B Halatak	Farrah Yousef - Mako B Halatak
2017	A'aed El Sineen	Farrah Yousef - A'aed El Sineen
2017	Aza Albi	Farrah Yousef - Aza Albi
2016	Tani Tani	Farrah Yousef - Tani Tani
2016	Lahzet Rojou3ak	Farrah Yousef - Lahzet Rojou3ak
2016	Hayati LaMeen	Farrah Yousef - Hayati LaMeen
2016	MAMA	Farrah Yousef - MAMA
2013	Tarik Gideed	Farrah Yousef - Tarik Gideed
2012	Bet Amer (soundtrack)	Farrah Yousef - Law Yrjaa Elly kan
2012	Al-Ammimi (soundtrack)	Farrah Yousef - Eghlou El-Sham
2011	Wiladeh Min Alkhasirah (soundtrack)	Farrah Yousef - Wiladeh Min Alkhasirah

=== Arab Idol performances ===
Farrah Yousef performances - Arab Idol
Week #	Song choice	Original artist
Audition	Ifrah Ya Albi	Umm Kulthum
Round 2	Emta Ha Taaraf	Asmahan
Round 3	Mdam Bthb	Umm Kulthum
Round 3 results	Khdni Ma'ak	Salwa Atreeb
Round 4 Prime 1	Helm	Umm Kulthum
Round 4 Prime 2	Habena	Mayada Al Hinawi
Round 4 Prime 3	La Shhad Hobak	Najwa Karam
Round 4 Prime 4	Laqetak W Dneh Lel	Diana Haddad
Round 4 Prime 5	Ihsas Jdeed	Nancy Ajram
Round 4 Prime 5 results	Kiefak; Someone Like You	Fairuz; Adele
Round 4 Prime 6	Aw3dak	Soad Mohamad
Round 4 Prime 7	Ya Bd3 El Ward	Asmahan
Round 4 Prime 8	Etazlet Al Gharam	Majida El Roumi
Round 4 Prime 9	Al Oun El Sood	Warda
Final	Qdood; Qalo Tara; Bktob Esml ya Bladi	Abadi Al Johar
Final Results	Ifrah Ya Albi	Umm Kulthum
