= Badr bin Abdul Mohsen Al Saud =

Saudi prince and poet (1949–2024)

- بدر بن عبد المحسن آل سعود
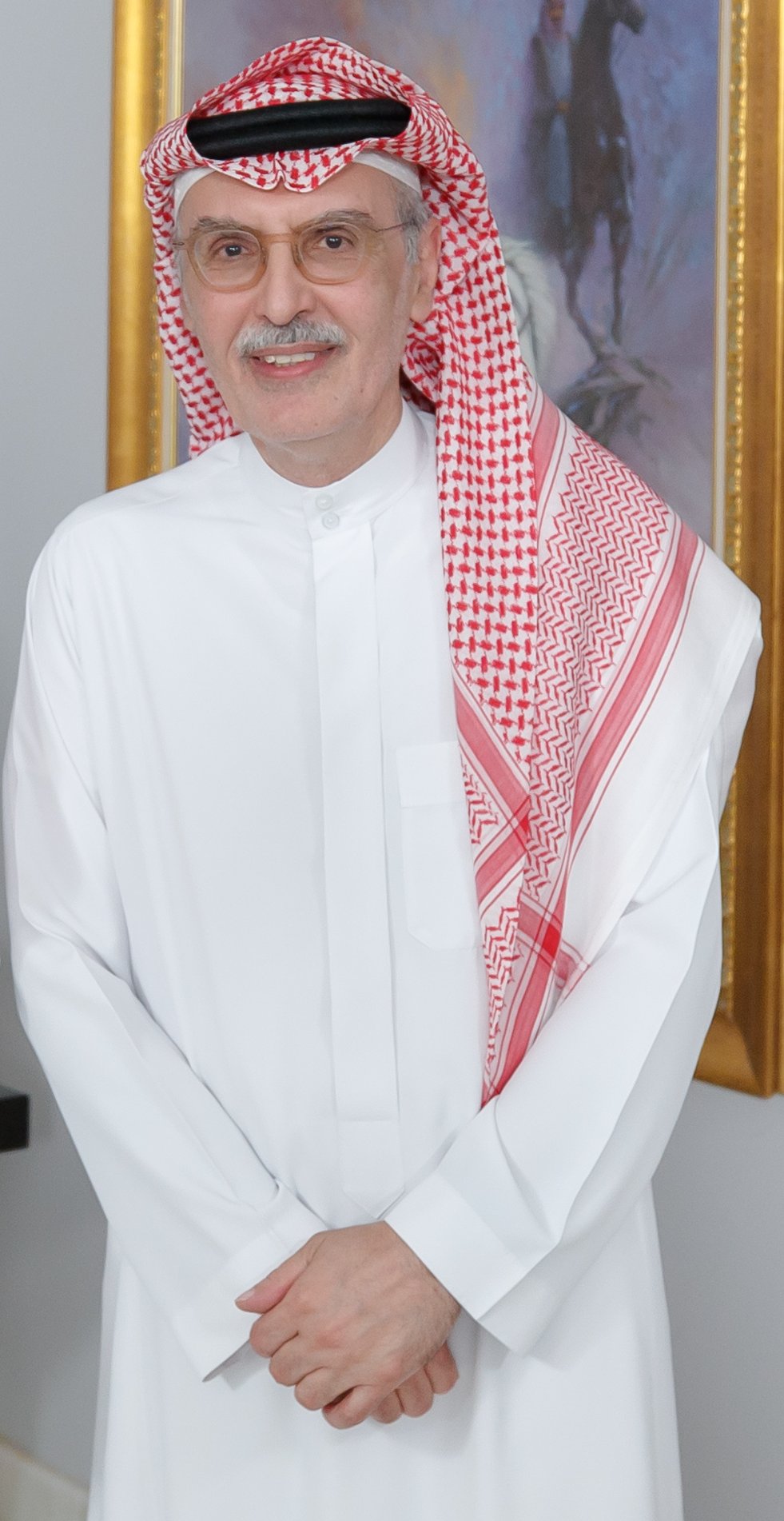
- Badr bin Abdul Mohsen Al Saud
- Born: 2 April 1949
- Died: 4 May 2024 (aged 75)
- Occupations: Poet, painter
- Father: Abdul Muhsin bin Abdulaziz Al Saud
- Family: House of Saud

Badr bin Abdul Mohsen Al Saud (Arabic: بدر بن عبد المحسن آل سعود; 2 April 1949 – 4 May 2024) was a Saudi prince, Arabic poet and painter. He was a son of Prince Abdul Muhsin bin Abdulaziz Al Saud and nephew of all Saudi kings since 1953. He was a grandson of Saudi's founder King Abdulaziz. He is known in the Arab world for his five poetry collections, where he combined both traditional and modernist styles of Arabic poetry.

== Biography ==
Al-Badr, as he was called, started writing poetry at the age of 16. Author of five poetry collections, he drew inspiration from two different styles of Arabic poetry, vernacular Nabati Bedouin tradition and modernist Arabic poetry. Further, he was known for his innovations of contemporary Arabic poetry. Some of his sentimental and romantic verses also became lyrics for Arabic songs. Among other public events, his works were performed in 2018 at the Jenadriyah festival. In 2023, he performed at a poetry evening at the King Abdulaziz Center for World Culture and opened his first art exhibition in Saudi Arabia entitled "Masterpieces of Al-Badr". According to literary scholar Mouneera Al-Ghadeer, his "spiritual and humanist tone" resembles that of Lebanese-American poet Kahlil Gibran.

In 2019, King Salman bin Abdulaziz awarded him the King Abdulaziz Medal. In 1973, he became president of The Saudi Arabian Society for Culture and Arts and later chaired the Saudi Poetry Organization.

== Death ==
Badr Bin Abdulmohsin died on 4 May 2024 at the age of 75. His death was mourned in numerous tributes and obituaries in TV programmes and newspapers of the Gulf region and the Arab world.

== Legacy ==
In June 2024, King Salman ordered a road in Riyadh to be named after Badr bin Abdul Mohsen, following a recommendation from Crown Prince Mohammed bin Salman. The road is located west of Princess Nourah bint Abdulrahman University, bordered by King Salman Road to the north and Al Thoumamah Road to the south.

== Awards and recognition ==
- King Abdulaziz Medal, 2019
- UNESCO World Poetry Day, 2019
- Personality of the Year, Kuwait, 2023

== Works ==
All Arabic original titles given in English translation:

- What the Sparrow Engraves on the Date (1989)
- A Letter from a Bedouin (1990)
- A Painting, Perhaps a Poem (1996)
- The Nectar of Letters (2022)
- The Peaks of Clouds (2022)

== National works ==
- Above the Peaks of the Clouds (Fawq Hām al-Suḥub) – performed by Mohammed Abdu.
- Allah Al-Badi – operetta, 1410 AH (1990).
- Janadriyah Festival Operetta No. 7: Waqfat Haqq (A Stand for Justice), 1412 AH (1992).
- Janadriyah Festival Operetta No. 14: Fares Al-Tawhid (Knight of Monotheism), 1419 AH (1999).
- Janadriyah Festival Operetta No. 24: Watan Al-Shumous (Homeland of the Suns), 1430 AH (2009).
- Janadriyah Festival Operetta No. 32: A’immah wa Muluk (Imams and Kings), 1439 AH (2018).
- Kingdom of Love and Peace – operetta performed at the launch ceremony of the Saudi Ministry of Culture Vision, 1440 AH (2019).
- Swords of Glory – performed by Mohammed Abdu.
- Speak to Us, Highlands of Najd – performed by Mohammed Abdu.
- Awafi – performed by Mohammed Abdu.
- Pride of the Homeland – performed by Talal Maddah.
- The Cry – performed by Talal Maddah.
- We Are All Salman – performed by Diana Haddad.
- Ya Dar – performed at the opening ceremony of the Souq Okaz Festival in 2017.
- Ya Tuwaiq – performed by Ayed.
- God Is One – performed by Mohammed Abdu.
- Contributed to writing the Symphony of the Beginning (Simfūniyyat Al-Bidāyah), an orchestral performance marking Saudi Founding Day on 22 February 2024, in collaboration with Khalid Al-Faisal and poets Najla Al-Muhaia (Mo‘tezah), Fahd Aafit, and Nayef Saqr.
- Our Home Is Like a Bride, and We Are All Her Suitors – performed by Mohammed Abdu.
- Who Can Believe It? Saudi National Day 2024 – performed by Mohammed Abdu.
