= Haidy Moussa =

Egyptian singer and actress

Haidy Moussa هايدي موسى
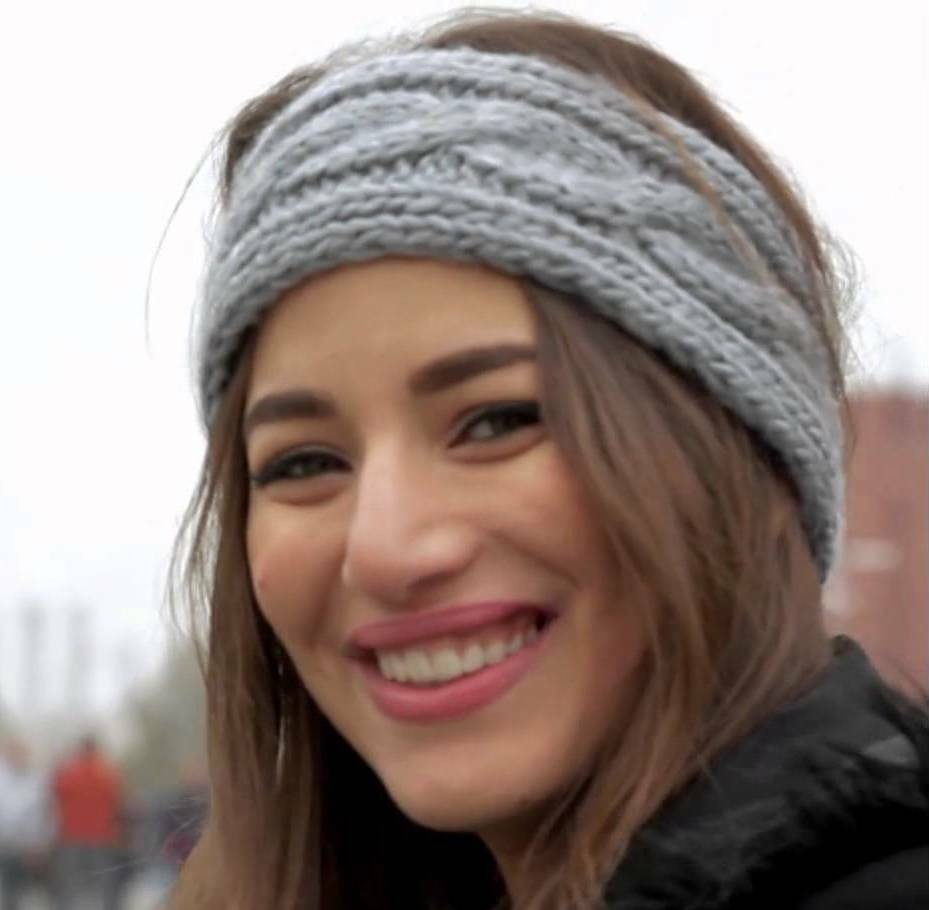
- Haidy Moussa at Moscow in 2015.

Background information
- Born: November 15, 1993 (age 31); Mansoura, Dakahlia, Egypt
- Genres: Arabic music; Arabic pop music
- Occupations: Singer; Actor
- Instrument: Vocals
- Years active: 2015–present
- Labels: Mazzika; Pause Production

Haidy Moussa (Arabic: هايدي موسى), is an Egyptian singer and actress. In 2016 and 2017 she received DG (Dear Gest) and MEMA Award (Middle East Music awards) for best rising singer. Haidy started her musical Career in Cairo Opera House which is considered one of the most significant places that related to music in Egypt.

== Early life ==
Haidy was born on November 15, 1993, in Mansoura, she is the youngest one in her family, she has two brothers Sharef and Hisham. Haidy lives in artistic family, her father Moussa Moussa and brother Hisham are popular in the field of fine art.

== Career ==
Haidy's father had insisted to grow her talent so Haidy joined to The Palace Of Culture in Mansoura, in addition to that, at age 9, the Egyptian Maestro Selim Sahab heard Haidy's voice, after that he insisted to see Haidy joining to him in the "Operah", in spite of the distance between Cairo and Mansoura, Haidy trained, practiced, singing and developed her talent beside to Selim Sahab in the Operah.

=== Musical Shows ===
At age 19 Haidy participated in Arab Idol (season 2) in 2012 and reached the live episodes and was excluded after the second live prime. Since that program until 2015 Haidy presented two singles, one of her country Egypt and the other in the gulf accent. During that period she also studied Media studies in Mansoura University. In 2015 Haidy joined to Star Academy Arab World competition and reached the final.

In 2016 Haidy released her first single Noa'ta w mn awl elstr.

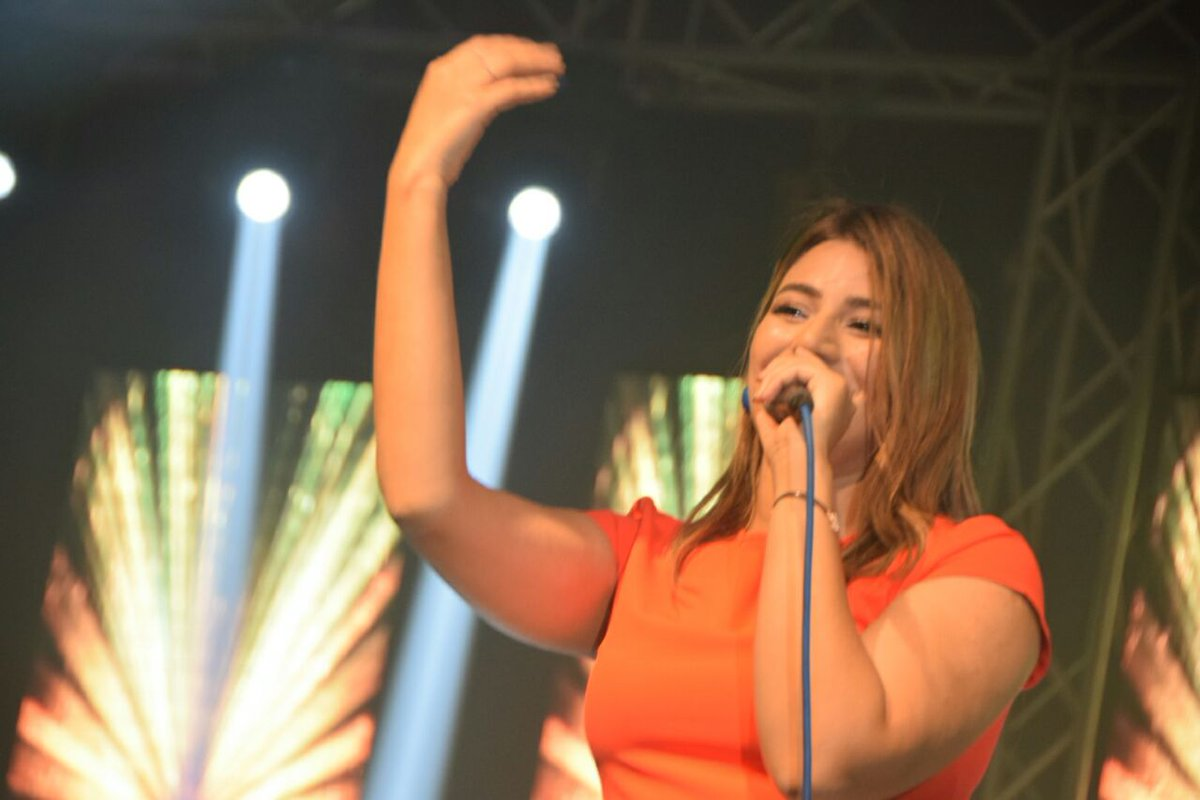
Haidy Moussa in 2017.

in 2017 Haidy released her second single Lama ted7akly.

in 2018 Haidy released her first album Henyat El-Donia.

== Awards and honors ==
- DG Best Female Rising Singer 2016.
- MEMA Best Female rising star 2017.
- Top Beauty World's 100 Most Beautiful Women List: 2016 (38th), 2017 (13th), 2018 (?) and 2019 (33rd).

== Discography ==
- Henyat El-Donia (2018)

== Filmography ==
- L'la Se'r (2017)
