= Melhem Barakat =

Lebanese musician

Melhem Barakat ملحم بركات
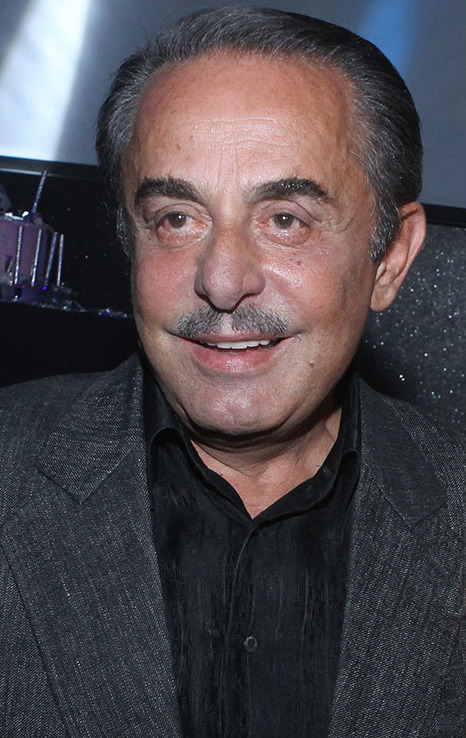
- Barakat on October 14th, 2014.

Background information
- Born: 15 August 1945; Kfarshima, Lebanon
- Died: 28 October 2016 (aged 71) Achrafieh, Lebanon
- Genres: Lebanese music Arabic pop
- Occupations: Singer; Songwriter; Composer
- Years active: 1960–2016
- Labels: Relax-In International; EMI Arabia

Melhem Barakat (Arabic: ملحم بركات; 15 august 1945 – 28 October 2016), also known as Melhim Barakat or Abou Majd, was a Lebanese singer, songwriter, and composer. Barakat was a renowned singer in Lebanon and the wider Arab world. He toured Australia, South America, Canada, and the United States.

== Early life ==
Barakat was born on 15 August 1945, in Kfarshima, Lebanon. He inherited his affinity for music from his father, who was a carpenter and taught Melhem how to play the oud. In 1960, Barakat dropped out of school at the age of 15 and enrolled in the National Institute of Music without his father's knowledge. He studied music theory, solfège and Eastern singing. He would drop out of the institute four years later on the advice of Philemon Wehbe, beginning his professional career.

== Career ==
Barakat started his career in the 1960s. He participated as an actor and singer in many of the Rahbani brothers' musicals and operettas. In 1968, he left the brothers to pursue a solo career.

Since the 1990s, Melhem Barakat had several popular songs, such as "Habibi Enta," which was later sung by his ex-wife May Hariri. He also collaborated with Najwa Karam, Karol Sakr, Shatha Hassoun, and Majida El Roumi.

== Musical style ==
Barakat composed music for some of the best Arab singers of the past century, including Sabah, Samira Tewfik, Wadih El Safi and Majida El Roumi ("I'tazalt al-Gharam"). Barakat was known for his energetic songs that mixed classical music with his personal improvisations.

== Notable songs ==
Year	Original Title	Translation	Songwriter(s)	Label
1975	Ya Shaweesh El Karakon - with Fairuz & William Hasswani - from the musical Ya'eesh Ya'eesh	---	Assi & Mansour Rahbani	Voix de l'Orient
1975	Belghi Kul Mawaidi - duet with Georgette Sayegh	I'll Cancel All My Appointments	Melhem Barakat, Maroun Karam	Voix de l'Orient
1978	Ya Ahl El Habayeb - from the musical Amira Zmourod	Parents of the Lovers	Romeo Lahoud	Voix de l'Orient
1980	Can El Zaman W Kan - a.k.a. Hanna Al Sakran	Hanna the Drunk	Elias Rahbani	Voix de l'Orient
1980	Shu Natir	What Are You Waiting For	Assi & Mansour Rahbani	Voix de l'Orient
1980	Habbeytak Ou Behebbak	I Loved You and I Still Do	Assi & Mansour Rahbani	Voix de l'Orient
1981	Wahdi Ana	On My Own	Ghadi Rahbani, Marwan Rahbani	Voix de l'Orient
1994	Ala Baby Wa'if Amarain	The Beautiful One at My Door	Melhem Barakat, Shafiq al-Mughrabi	Relax-In
1994	Ya Hobbi Elly Ghab	My Love Who's Gone	Melhem Barakat, Mounir Abdel Nour	Relax-In
1996	Keef	How	Melhem Barakat, Michel Geha	Relax-In
2006	I'tazalt Al Gharam - performed by Majida El Roumi	I Forgot About Love	Melhem Barakat, Nizar Francis, Majida El Roumi	EMI
2009	Taa Nensa	Let's Forget	Melhem Barakat, Nizar Francis	Music Box
2016	Kermal Al Nisyan	In Memory	Melhem Barakat, Nizar Francis	Music Box

== Personal life ==
Barakat was first married to Souad Feghali, the sister of Lebanese singer Sabah. He later married Randa Azar with whom he had three children: Majd (hence Melhem's alias Abou Majd), Waad and Ghinwa. His third and final marriage was to Lebanese singer and actress May Hariri, with whom he had a child, Melhem Junior, before the couple divorced. He was Antiochian Orthodox Christian.

== Death ==
He died of prostate cancer on 28 October 2016 at Hôtel-Dieu de France hospital in Achrafieh, Lebanon. He was 71. His funeral took place at Saint Nicolas Church in Achrafieh, Beirut. Many Lebanese singers and politicians were present at the funeral mass, including Ragheb Alama, Fares Karam, Majida El Roumi, Rola Saad and Barakat's ex-wife May Hariri.

== Tribute ==
On August 15, 2021, Google celebrated his 76th birthday with a Google Doodle.
