= May Hariri =

Lebanese pop artist

May Hariri (Arabic: مي حريري) born 1968 is a Lebanese pop artist, actress and the ex-wife of singer Melhem Barakat.

== Discography ==
=== Studio albums ===
- 2002: Monawat
- 2004: Hasahar Oyono
- 2006: Habibe Inta
- 2008: Omry Tani
- 2011: Jani O Jani
- 2012: Bhebak Ana Bejnoun
- 2015: Bahwak
- 2016: Nadmana
