= Selim Sahab =

Lebanese-Egyptian conductor and music educator

Selim Sahab سليم سحاب
- Born: 1941 (age 84–85); Jaffa, Mandatory Palestine
- Genres: Arabic music, classical music
- Occupations: Conductor, composer, music educator, writer
- Member of: Cairo Opera House (Artistic Director); National Arab Music Ensemble (Founding Conductor)
- Formerly of: Cairo Opera Children's Choir (Artistic Director), Egyptian Children Choir (Founder)

Selim Sahab (Arabic: سليم سحاب; born 1941) is a Lebanese-Egyptian conductor, composer, music educator and writer born in Jaffa, Mandatory Palestine. He established the Beirut Arab Music Ensemble in 1980 and was the founding conductor of the National Arab Music Ensemble at the Cairo Opera House in 1989. He also founded the Cairo Opera Children's Choir and later developed music education initiatives for children in Egypt.

== Early life and education ==
Sahab was born into a Lebanese family in Jaffa. His family moved to Amman in 1945 and later settled in Lebanon. His brothers, Elias and Victor Sahab, also became writers on music. The family listened to Arabic and European classical music, and Sahab developed an interest in orchestral conducting during his youth.

He studied music theory at the Beirut Conservatory, where his teachers included Salvador Arnita. He subsequently received a scholarship to study in the Soviet Union, completing studies in choral conducting at the Gnessin Russian Academy of Music in 1971 and in symphonic and operatic conducting at the Tchaikovsky Moscow State Conservatory in 1976.

== Career in Lebanon ==
After returning to Lebanon in 1977, Sahab worked as a music supervisor for Lebanese state radio and wrote about music for publications including Al-Fikr al-Arabi and As-Safir. In 1980 he established the Beirut Arab Music Ensemble, which he conducted until its final concerts in 1997. He founded a children's choir devoted to Arabic music in 1986. Both ensembles were initially associated with the Arab Cultural Club.

== Career in Egypt ==
In 1988 Sahab was invited to perform in Egypt by the Ministry of Culture. His first concert there took place on 3 March at the Sayed Darwish Hall. He accepted an offer to teach at the Higher Institute of Arabic Music and settled in Egypt. He acquired Egyptian citizenship in 1994.

In 1989, during the tenure of opera chairperson Ratiba El-Hefny, Sahab became the founding conductor of the National Arab Music Ensemble. The ensemble was created to preserve and present the musical heritage of the Arab world. Its repertoire included traditional Arabic vocal and instrumental forms, and Sahab adapted Western orchestral techniques to the performance of Arabic music.

At the Babylon Music Festival in Iraq, the ensemble received a gold medal and Sahab received a silver medal during its first year. The ensemble toured internationally, appearing at the Carthage Festival in Tunisia in 1990, the Silk Road Festival in Japan in 1991, and celebrations marking the centenary of Umm Kulthum in Paris in 2001.

Sahab conducted performances with singers including Fairuz, Wadih El Safi, Souad Mohamed and Lotfi Bouchnak. In 2016, Ahram Online described him as an artistic director at the Cairo Opera House.

== Music education ==
Sahab founded the Cairo Opera Children's Choir in 1989 and served as its first artistic director. Singers associated with the choir include Sherine Abdel Wahab, Tamer Hosny, May Farouk, Reham Abdel Hakim and Ahmed Saad.

In 2014, Sahab launched the Egyptian Children Choir to offer musical instruction to orphans and children experiencing homelessness. The project subsequently worked with residential care institutions and received support from cultural, educational and social welfare organizations.

In July 2025, Egypt's Ministry of Culture announced the Egypt National Choir and Orchestra project under Sahab's direction. It was designed to recruit and train young vocalists and instrumentalists across the country. Rehearsals were underway in Cairo by March 2026.

== Writing and recordings ==
Sahab has written on the history and theory of Arabic music. His book A‘lam Musiqiyya (Musical Figures), published in 2014 by Egypt's National Library and Archives, contains studies of Arab and European musicians and composers. With his brothers Elias and Victor, he also co-authored Music and Singing in Palestine Before and After 1948 (2021). Selim and Elias wrote the historical section covering the period before 1948, which had previously appeared in the Palestinian Encyclopedia.

In 2009, a recording titled Muwashshahat was released, featuring live performances by the Beirut Arab Music Ensemble drawn from concerts at the American University of Beirut in 1986, 1987 and 1991. The collection included works by composers such as Sayed Darwish, Zakariyya Ahmad and Dawood Hosni.

== Honors ==
In 2019, Sahab was among the artists honored on the 31st anniversary of the Cairo Opera House. In January 2023, he received a distinction at the eighth edition of the Carthage Musical Days festival in Tunisia. He was also honored at the Spirits in the City cultural celebration at Cairo Opera House in June 2025.
