= Karol Sakr =

Lebanese actress & singer (born 1969)

Karol Sakr كارول إتيان قيصر صقر
- Born: Karol Etienne Sakr; August 11, 1969 (age 56); Zahlé, Lebanon
- Origin: Lebanon
- Genres: Lebanese Music, Pop
- Years active: 1980s–present

Karol Etienne Sakr (Arabic: كارول إتيان صقر, alternative spelling Carole Sakr or Carole Saqr; born August 11, 1969) is a Lebanese singer who is most known for her English songs in the 1980s. She is the daughter of the Lebanese Maronite exiled politician Etienne Sakr, a former member of the Lebanese Forces and leader of the far-right Guardians of the Cedars.

Carole Sakr gained fame as the lead singer for the Lebanese music band "ZED". ZED was a music duo project consisting of Carole and music composer Hadi Sharara. Together they released an album entitled Away in the early 1990s, which included singles like "My One 4 Everything", part of the song being also used as a promotional jingle for Radio One Lebanon, "Shout" and the title track "Away" for which a vid was shot and aired on local TV stations. The duo also took part in international musical festivals. Their last recording as ZED was a non-album single exclusively played on Radio One Lebanon. After the split-up of the band, Karol continued to enjoy a solo music career.

In the early 1990s, Karol emigrated to Australia, where she resided for five years, taking part in the Australian version of Star Search and winning the first prize. She then traveled to the United States where she took part in American Star Search, coming in second.. She returned in 1994 to Lebanon, reappearing on the music scene with a new Arabic album which made her steps back in the music industry.

In year 2006, Hadi Sharara supported his wife Karol Sakr in driving her new album entitled Daiet Albak to reach the top albums in the Arab world. He arranged all the album songs and composed the song "Wayn Blaeek". He also took part beside Karol and the musician Melhem Barakat in shooting the music video for the "Daiet Albak" song.

== Personal life ==
Karol Sakr married Hadi Sharara, son of the renowned television personality Riad Sharara and a member of the ZED band alongside Karol. They have two children together, a daughter and a son.

Karol is the sister of Lebanese singer Pascale Sakr.
