= Asma Lamnawar =

Moroccan actress and singer (born 1978)

- أسما لمنور
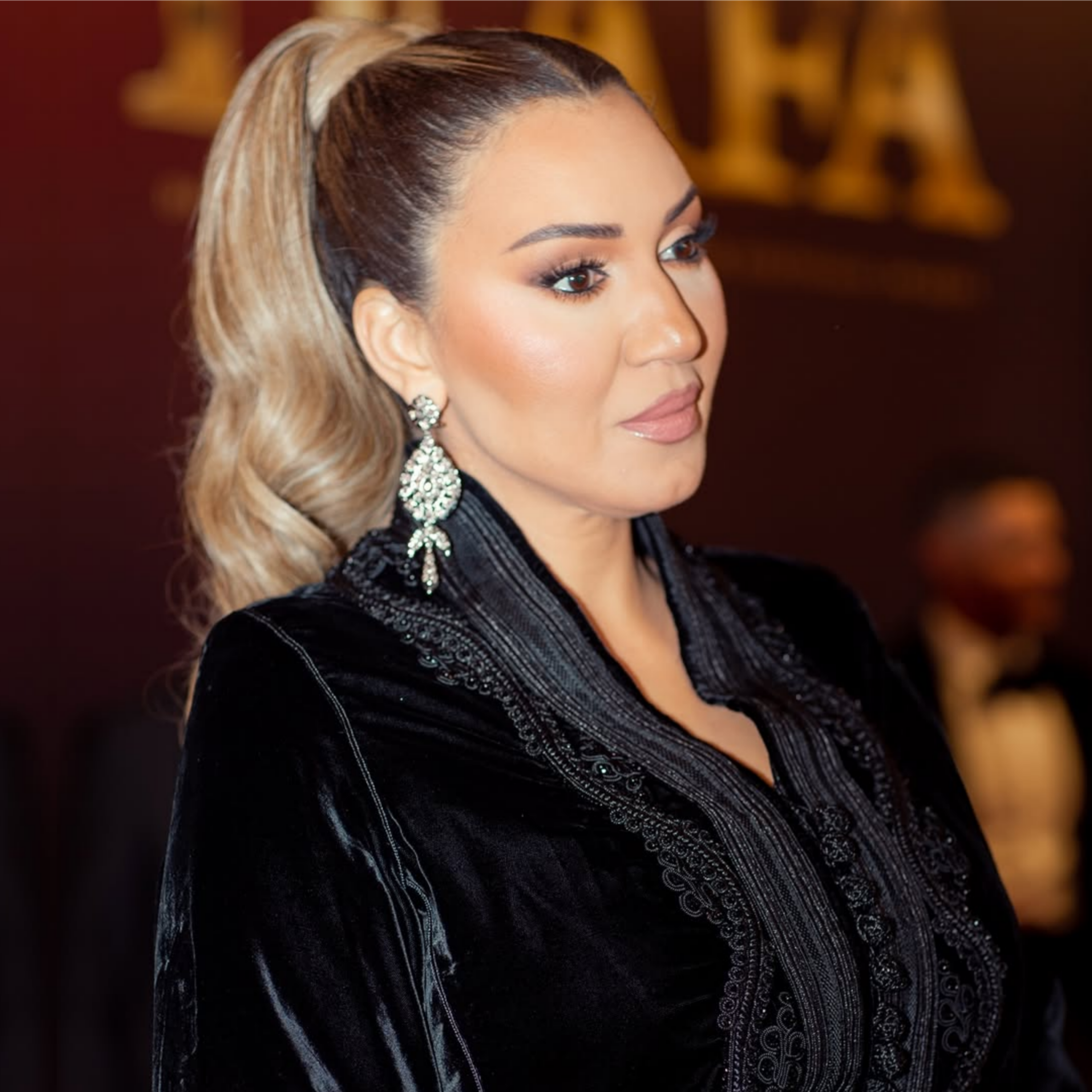
- Asma Lamnawar at DIAFA awards
- Born: 25 July 1978 (age 48); Casablanca, Morocco
- Occupations: Singer; actress
- Years active: 2002–present
- Musical career
- Genre: Arabic music
- Instrument: Vocals
- Label: Rotana

Asma Lamnawar (Arabic: أسماء لمنور; born 25 July 1978) is a Moroccan singer and actress.

== Career ==
She made her singing debut in 1995 with "Angham", a festival produced by Moroccan Radio and TV, where she won the prize for best interpretation, though she delayed beginning her musical career until 2002. She has recorded music for Moroccan television serials and films. She toured with the ensemble "Oriental Mood" in Denmark, Sweden and especially in Egypt.

Her first album, "وا ناري" ("Fiery"), was released in 2002. "شي عادي" ("Something Normal") was released by Art-Jazeera Saudi Arabia in 2005, and she sang a duet with Abu the same year. She signed to Rotana in 2008, and released an album "من هنا لبكره" ("Men Hina L Bukra") with them the same year. Another album (Rouh) was released with Rotana in 2010. Asma released the album Sabiya, produced by Rotana, in 2017 and in 2019 she released a khaleeji album "أوساط النجوم".

Asma was one of the singers that took part in the 2022 FIFA Club World Cup official song entitled “Welcome to Morocco”, that took place in Morocco.

== Discography ==
=== Singles ===
- Lytima (2017)
- Ha 7na Jina (2017)
- Hayna (2020)
- Omri Wi Shouqi (2021)
- Ya Aghla Men Nafsi (2021)
- Ydirha Lhob (2021)
- We9tach (2021)
- Ana Low (2021)
- Mowarey (2022)
- Sid Lghram (feat. Assala) (2022)
- Hada Hali Min Baadak (2023)
- Pub Orange (2024)
- Ala Ma Aden (2024)
- Beshwesh (2025)
- Hada Galbi (feat. Mehdi Mozayine) (2025)
- Ch7al S3ib (2025)
- Galbi Kebeer (2025)
- Mgharba (2025)
