= George Wassouf =

Syrian actor and singer (born 1961)

- جورج وسوف
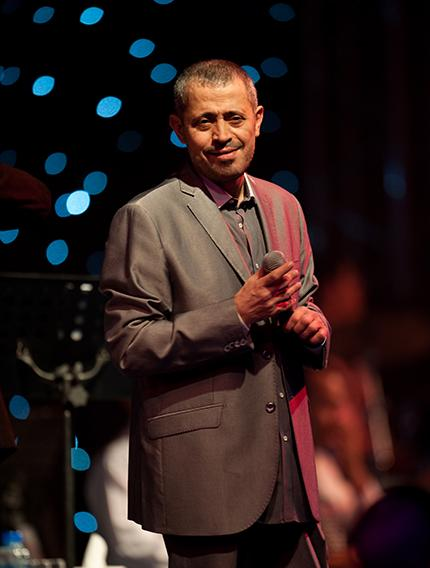
- Wassouf in 2009
- Born: 23 December 1961 (age 64); Kafroun, Syria
- Occupations: Actor; singer
- Spouses: Shalimar Wassouf (m. 1982; div. 2009) Nada Zeidan (m. 2014; div. 2016)
- Children: 4
- Musical career
- Genres: Arabic Music
- Years active: 1971–present
- Labels: Rotana; Relax-In; EMI Music Arabia

George Wassouf (Arabic: جورج وسوف; born 23 December 1961) is a Syrian singer. In a career spanning more than four decades, he has released more than 30 albums, with a significantly large audience of fans throughout the Arab world. Dubbed Sultan El-Tarab (Arabic: سلطان الطرب), he is one of the most successful Arab singers selling over 60 million records worldwide.

== Early life and career ==
Wassouf was born in Kafroun, Syria to a Greek Orthodox Christian family. Wassouf started singing at the age of 9 in his hometown Kafroun. He was discovered by his first manager and producer George Yazbeck at a wedding party that Wassouf was performing at, aged 12 years old. At the age of 16, he was called Sultan El-Tarab (The Sultan of Music) by the Lebanese journalist George Ibrahim El Khoury, a magazine director, with his classic song "el-Hawa Sultan". At age 19, he appeared on the 1980 Lebanese show Studio El Fan as Sultan of Tarab. Wassouf also holds Lebanese citizenship.

Wassouf preferred not to shoot music videos for his songs saying: "I don't feel I can act... I really can't... I only find myself when I'm on the stage... singing, but the video clip forces me to act".

== Personal life ==
George Wassouf married his first wife, Shalimar, at the age of 21. They had three children: Wadih, Hatem and George Jr. The couple separated after 28 years of marriage in 2009. On January 6, 2023, their eldest son Wadih died due to complications from a gastric bypass surgery.

In 2014, he married Qatar rally champion Nada Zeidan, his second wife. They divorced in 2016. Their daughter, Oyoon, was born in October 2015.

Wassouf was a prominent supporter of President Bashar al-Assad's government throughout the Syrian Civil War.

In 2008, he was arrested in Sweden for possession of cocaine.

== Discography ==
- 1983: Ouwidni Salmtek Byied Allah
- 1984: El Hawa Sultan
- 1992: Rouh El Rouh
- 1993: She' Ghareeb
- 1995: Kalam El Nass
- 1997: Leil Al Ashiqeen
- 1998: Lissa El Dounya Bi Khair
- 1999: Tabeeb Garrah
- 2000: Dol Mush Habayib
- 2001: Zaman El Ajayib
- 2002: Inta Gherhom
- 2003: Salaf Wi Deine
- 2004: Etakhart Kteer
- 2006: Heya El Ayam
- 2008: Kalamak Ya Habibi
- 2009: Allah Kareem, Shoukran
- 2012: Best of Wassouf
- 2015: Shtaanelak

=== Live Albums ===
- Sings Oum Kolthoum Vol. 1, 1983.
- Sings Oum Kolthoum Vol. 2, 1995.
- Sings Oum Kolthoum Vol. 3, 1997.
- Sings Abdel Halim Hafez, 1998.
- Sings Warda, 1999

=== Singles ===
- "Ahla Ayam El Omr", 1995.
- "Amri Lellah", 1995.
- "Mahlak Tmahal Ya Malak", 1995.
- "Rahal El Batal", 2000.
- "Ferhat Rejouak Ya Loubnan", 2010.
- "Dawarat El Ayam", 2010.
- "Aady Ya Donia", 2011.
- "Biyehsedouni", 2011.
- "Seket El Kalam", 2013
- "Bisaalouni Aleik", 2013.
- "Ya Oumi", 2013.
- "Zekrayat", 2013.
- "Shouq El Omr", 2013.
- "Tarakni Ghab", 2014.
- "Bandahlak", 2017.
- "Malikat Gamal El Rouh", 2018
- "Hal El Garih", 2019.
- "Sahi El Leil", 2020.
- "Byetkallem Aalaya", 2022.
- "Noss Omry", 2023.

=== Clips ===
- Yalli Taebna Senin Fi Hawah, 1986.
- Ya Moualdani, 1986.
- Kalam El Nass, 1994.
- Erda Bel Nassib, 1996.
- Lissa El Donya Bkheir, 1998.
- Tabib Garah, 1999.
- Ana Assef, 1999.
- Dul Mush Habayeb, 2000.
- Ma Teoulou Leih, 2000.
- Zaman El Agayeb, 2001.
- Youm El Wadaa, 2001.
- Salaf We Dayn, 2003.
- Etakhart Ktir, 2004.
- Sehert El Leyl, 2004.
- Leilat Wadaana, 2006.
- Asaab Fourak, 2008.
- Aallem Albi El Shouk, 2008.
- Ferhat Rejouak Ya Loubnan, 2010.
- Dawarat El Ayam, 2010.
- Biyehsedouni, 2011.
- Malikat Gamal El Rouh, 2018.
- Hal El Garih, 2019.
- Sahi El Leil, 2020.
