= Majid Al Mohandis =

Iraqi-Saudi actor, singer, and composer (born 1971)

Majid Al Mohandis ماجد المهندس
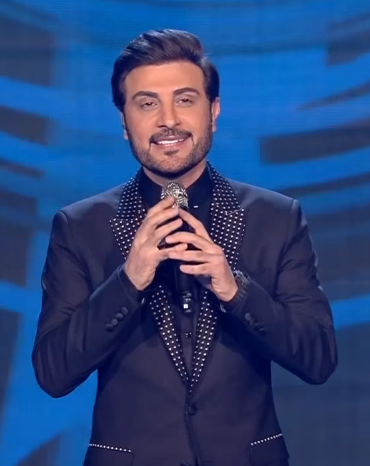
- Majid Al Mohandis in 2017

Background information
- Born: Majid Abd al-Amir Adir al-Attabi ماجد عبد الأمير عذير العتيبي; 25 October 1971 (age 55); Baghdad, Iraq
- Genre: Arabic music
- Years active: 1992–present
- Labels: Al-Khoyool; Rotana

Majid Abd al-Amir Adir al-Attabi (Arabic: ماجد عبد الأمير عذير العتابي; born 25 October 1971), better known as Majid Al Mohandis (ماجد المهندس), is an Iraqi-Saudi singer and composer. His success in the Arab world has earned him the titles of "the Engineer of the Arabic song" (مهندس الاغنية العربية) and "Voice of Diamond" (صاحب الصوت الماسي).

== Biography ==
Majid Al Mohandis was born 25, October 1971 in Baghdad, Iraq. He studied Engineering in Baghdad, hence the nickname "Al Mohandis (المهندس)," which means "the engineer" in Arabic. He was raised in a large Muslim family, where he was diligent about work. Upon finishing his university studies, he maintained an interest in arts. Al Mohandis had always aspired to become a musician, despite his family's opposition and anger in the matter; he opposed his parents' desire, however, and finished his higher education besides his lifelong passion: Music. Majid even worked as a tailor for several years while chasing his artistic ambitions. It was then when he had bought himself his first 'oud to practice and evolve as a musician.

He was a featured performer on the fourth season of Arab Idol in 2017. And in 2022 he joined the jury for Saudi Idol together with Aseel Abu Bakr, Ahlam, and Assala.

== Personal life ==
Al Mohandis married a French woman, who is of Arab descent, and they had a son named Muhammed before later divorcing.

In 2010, Al Mohandis was given Saudi citizenship by King Abdullah while retaining his Iraqi citizenship, amid criticism from some Iraqis.

== Discography ==
=== Studio albums ===
- "Mo Bas Ahebek" (2000)
- "Enta Tejanen" (2001)
- "Dagat Galby" (2002)
- "Wahishni Moot" (2005)
- "Enjaneat" (2006)
- "Ensaa" (2008)
- "Ezkerini" (2009)
- "Layali Februrai" (2011)
- "Ana Wayyak" (2013)
- "Mohami" (2015)
- "Febrayer ElKuwait 2015" (2015)
- "Majid Almuhandis" (2015)
- "Akh Qalby" (2016)
- "Eldenya Dawaarah" (2018)
- "Shahd El Hourouf" (2020)
- "Wahish Al Denya" (2021)
- "Meshtaqelak" (2022)
- "Eateni Waqtan" (2022)
- "Bdet Ateeb" (2023)

=== Charted songs ===
Title	Year	Peak chart position			Album
Title	Year	MENA	KSA	UAE	Album
"Bdet Ateeb"	2023	4	9	*	Bdet Ateeb
"Janant Galbi"	2023	1	1	17	Non-album single
"*" denotes the chart did not exist at that time.
