= Samira Tewfik =

Samira Toufic
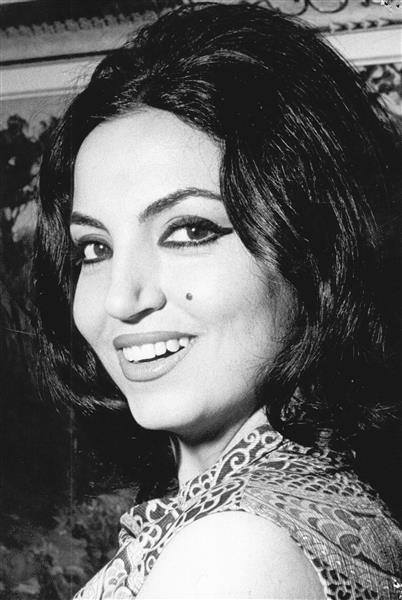
- Samira Toufic in the 1960s
- Born: Samira Ghastin Karimona; 25 December 1935 (age 90); Beirut, Lebanon
- Musical career
- Genres: Arabic music, Bedouin music
- Occupations: Singer, actress
- Instrument: Vocals

Samira Ghastin Karimona (Arabic: سميرة غسطين كريمونة; born 25 December 1935), better known by her stage name Samira Toufic (Arabic: سميرة توفيق, surname also spelled Tawfik, Tawfiq, Toufiq or Taoufiq) is a Lebanese singer who gained fame in the Arab world for her specializing in singing in the Bedouin Shawi Arabic.

== Biography ==
Samira was born into a Lebanese Christian family in the village of Rmayleh, Lebanon. She lived in the Rmayleh neighborhood of Beirut, Lebanon, with her sister and brother in law . As a child, she enjoyed Classical Arab music and was particularly a fan of Farid al-Atrash. She often climbed a tree at her home and sang his songs aloud. She was heard by musician Albert Ghaoui, who was impressed with her voice and asked her father to become her musical mentor. Ghaoui introduced Samira to the Egyptian musician Tawfiq Bayoumi who taught her the tawashih musical form. She gained her stage name "Tawfiq" (or "Tewfik") ("Success") when she declared al-Tawfiq Min Allah (success is from God). Her first hit on Radio Beirut was a song originally sung by Bayoumi called Maskin Ya Qalbi Yama Tlaawat ("Oh My Heart How You Have Suffered").

She struggled for success in Lebanon, due to the highly popular competing acts of Fairuz, Sabah and Wadi al-Safi, but she excelled after basing herself in Jordan in the 1960s and 1970s. There, the Jordanian Broadcasting Authority (JBA) employed her with the request that she sing in the Jordanian dialect. The JBA trained her to sing in the local dialect to make her music genuinely sound Jordanian. Her first song played by Jordanian radio was her first hit, Maskin Ya Qalbi Yama Tlaawat. Samira performed her first concert at a Jordanian village called Ainata and the following day was invited to perform at an event attended by King Hussein. King Hussein became a fan of her East Jordanian tunes and mawawil. She became the representative of Jordanian music to the Arab world by singing with the dialect of Jordan.

Samira would often perform in flamboyant, Jordanian-traditional-style dress, which gave her a "Jordanian aura". She became famous in Jordan for the nationalist-inspired songs Diritna al-Urduniya ("Our Jordanian Home Land") and Urdunn al-Quffiya al-Hamra ("Jordan of the Red Kuffiyah"), both songs that sought marry the concepts of the traditional Arab Jordanian culture and a Jordanian sense of nationhood. Her most commercially successful love song was Al Eyn Mulayitain ("Two Trips to the Water Spring"), which was about a rural girl who crosses a bridge multiple times a day ostensibly to collect water for her family, but with the actual intent of meeting a young man she is in love with.

Samira is generally considered the first major artist to represent Jordanian music and make it popular in the Arab world. Nonetheless, Samira's popularity was not matched by other Jordanian singers until the early 1990s with the singer Umar al-Abdallat.

Samira currently lives in the UAE where she moved in 2015 at the request of members of the Abu Dhabi royal family. She has never married or had any children.

== Bibliography ==
- Massad, Joseph A. (11 September 2001). Colonial Effects: The Making of National Identity in Jordan. Columbia University Press. ISBN 978-0-231-50570-3.
- Horn, David (2005), Continuum Encyclopedia of Popular Music of the World Part 2 Locations, vol. 5, Bloomsbury Academic, ISBN 9780826474360
- Massad, Joseph A. (2012), Colonial Effects: The Making of National Identity in Jordan, Columbia University Press, ISBN 9780231505703
- Shoup, John A. (2007), Culture and Customs of Jordan, Greenwood Publishing Group, ISBN 9780313336713
- Suleiman, Yasir (2013), Language and Society in the Middle East and North Africa, Routledge, ISBN 9781317849377
