= Mohammed Abdu =

Saudi singer (born 1949)

Mohammed Abdu محمد عبده
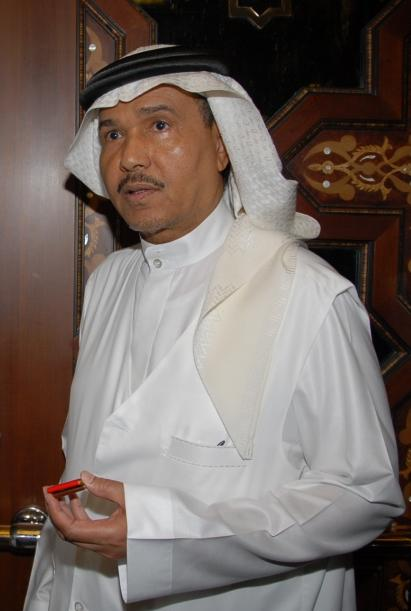

Background information
- Also known as: The Artist of the Arabs
- Born: Mohammed Abdu Othman; June 13, 1949 (age 77); Al Darb, Jazan, Saudi Arabia
- Genres: Saudi Arabian, Arabic music
- Occupations: Singer, composer
- Instruments: Oud, vocal
- Years active: 1961–present
- Label: Rotana

Mohammed Abdu (Arabic: محمد عبده; born June 12, 1949) is a Saudi singer. He has been described as the "Artist of the Arabs".

== Early years ==
Mohammed Abdu was born on June 12, 1949 in Al Shuqaiq, Jazan. His father, Abdu Othman Al-A'asiri, was a poor fisherman in Tihamah who had six children with his wife, Salma Nasr-Allah. At the time, Saudi Arabia at the time was in the midst of a smallpox epidemic, and almost all of their children died, including a three-year-old son named Mohammed. The couple vowed to name their next child in memory of him. The family then moved to Jeddah. His father left his job as a fisherman and became a bricklayer. In 1953, Abdu Othman Al-A'asiri left the family after he fell ill, dying before Mohammed took his first steps.

As a three-year-old orphan, Mohammed went with his mother and siblings to an orphanage house called Ribat Abu-Zinadah, a local Yemenite hostel for orphaned families. With the financial aid of the soon-to-be crown prince Faisal, the children were accepted. Mohammed Abdu commented on the home, saying "I learned how to live and depend on myself." After his graduation from sixth-grade, he started taking multiple menial jobs until he joined a vocational institute to make a living for himself and his family. He eventually moved back with his family and bought a new house with the little money he was given as a graduation gift.

In 1989, his mother died, and Mohammed stopped singing altogether. It was "one of the saddest moments in my entire life," as he described. She was the love of his life and the person Abdu sang for. Abdu was so saddened by her death that he decided not to release any more albums from 1989 until 1997.

Finally, in 1997, he sang at a National Day celebration to an audience amazed at how mature his voice had become; his voice was marvelous and more tact. That year, he went to London to sing at three concerts with Warda Al-Jazairia and released five albums in the following three months.

The next year saw his official comeback when he sang at the Abha Music Festival in 1998, releasing another three albums concurrently. Follow-up concerts in Qatar, Dubai, and Cairo were the much-needed efforts to put him back on the Arab musical map.

== Career ==
Abdu early in the start of his career

Mohammed Abdu began his music career at the beginning of the 1960s. He entered the world of singing at an early age, during his time at the Institute of Industrial Jeddah, where he graduated in 1963.

Abdu's music was based on the older generation's ageless talents and songs of deep heritage. He was credited with preserving many songs called mawrouth (the inherited songs) without changing them significantly. His Chaabyat albums that he released through his label "Voice of Al-Jazeerah" in the 1990s were his attempt at documenting that old tradition. These jalsat (sittings) were where his talent was best showcased; the oud was the instrument which he connected with most; only some musicians have shown this connection; these include: Farid al-Atrash, Baligh Hamdi, and Talal Maddah. Abdu even sang one of Baligh's compositions, 'Sert Al-Houb' (Love Story), for Umm Kulthum on her 69th birthday.

His earliest songs that he used to sing were religious chants and anasheed (Islamic songs that people are allowed to sing) and reciting the Quran after prayer time or in his school's celebrations. Students and teachers alike used to gather around him to hear him sing at breaks. Fearing that he might quit school to follow a career as a singer, his mother asked him to sing only by invitation when the older singers were around so that her son would stay a pupil to these established singers. His voice and oud playing overcame this fear when jaws dropped after he gave a rendition of an old Yemeni adwar (old songs of known Maqama) known for their near impossibility for a young singer to master. These songs were old chants that Yemeni singers sang and competed against each other with, to take each other to tarab.

On 30 September 2021, Abdu performed at the opening ceremony of Expo 2020 in Dubai, where he sang "If You're Out There?" with Angélique Kidjo.

== Personal life ==
From 1983 until 2009, Mohammed was married to Umm Noura with whom he has seven children.

in 2011, he remarried a French woman of Algerian origin following a stay in France for health reasons. He has two children from this new union: a son, Khalid, his eighth child, and in 2018, a daughter named Anoud.
