= Fayza Ahmed =

Syrian-Egyptian singer and actress (1934–1983)

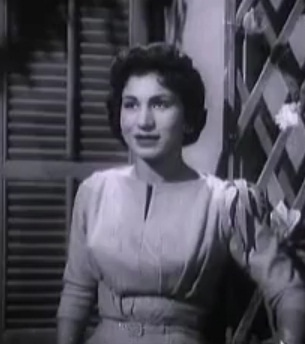
- Ahmed in 1959
- Born: 5 December 1934; Sidon, Mandate for Syria and the Lebanon
- Died: 24 September 1983 (aged 48); Cairo, Egypt
- Occupations: Singer and actress
- Years active: 1934–1983
- Children: Five

Fayza Ahmed (Arabic: فايزة أحمد; 5 December 1934 – 24 September 1983) was a Lebanese singer and actress.

During her career, she appeared in six films.

== Early life ==
Fayza Ahmed was born in 1934 in Sidon, Lebanon, to a Lebanese father from Sidon and a Lebanese mother from Tripoli.

== Competition ==
In singing, Ahmed emerged at a time when the field was already crowded with formidable competitors. These included Najat Al Saghira.

== Death ==
Ahmed died in 1983 in Cairo from breast cancer.

== Selected filmography ==
- Tamr Henna (1957), with Naima Akef, Ahmed Ramzy, and Rushdy Abaza
- Ana wa Banati (1961), with Salah Zulfikar, Zaki Rostom, and Zahrat El-Ola
