= Wadih El Safi =

Lebanese singer and guitar player (1921–2013)

Wadih El Safi وديع الصافي
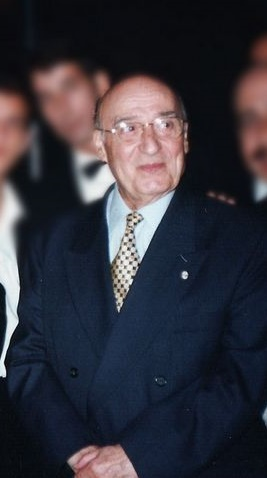

Background information
- Also known as: The Immortal Voice of Lebanon, The Lebanese Giant
- Born: Wadih Bishara Yousef Francis وديع بشارة يوسف فرنسيس; November 1, 1921; Niha, Greater Lebanon
- Died: October 11, 2013 (aged 91) Mansourieh, Lebanon
- Genres: Tarab, Folk
- Occupations: Singer, songwriter, composer, instrumentalist
- Instrument: Oud
- Years active: 1938–2013

Wadih El Safi (Arabic: وديع الصافي, romanized: Wadīʿ aṣ-Ṣāfī, born Wadih Francis; November 1, 1921 – October 11, 2013) was a Lebanese singer and composer. Born in Niha, Lebanon, Wadih El Safi started his artistic journey at the age of sixteen when he took part in a singing contest held by Lebanese Radio and was chosen the winner of all categories among 40 other competitors.

== Early life ==
Wadih El Safi was born into a Maronite family in Niha, Chouf on November 1, 1921. He was the second of eight children. His father Bishara Youssef Gabriel Francis, was a sergeant in the Lebanese gendarmerie and his sister Hanaa Al-Safi was a singer. Wadih El Safi's family moved to Beirut in 1930, and he entered the Deir El Mukhlis Catholic School, where he was the only Maronite in the choir and the lead singer. Three years later, he left school to earn money to support his family by singing.

== Style and career ==
Wadih El Safi being a classically trained tenor is not a verified fact since none of his known works provide proof of classical singing techniques. He has been known for singing in the belting school class, and his phonation is a testimonial of this practice. This is further confirmed in what arguably is his most famous song "Lebnan Ya Ote'et Sama" ("لبنان يا قطعة سما" in Arabic, specifically Lebanese dialect) in which his voice shifts to the so-called Falsetto or more widely recognized today as the "Voce Piena Testa" or the full head register on the second transition "Secondo passagio" around "EB4" note above middle "C4" not overlapping "F4", meaning that his voice falls in the Baritone categorization rather than a tenor precisely a lyric baritone which is often linked to these transition areas. Although El Safi has records for singing the "B4" and "C5" tenors' famous "High C" which are the characteristic signature of a tenor's laryngeal mechanism (constriction of the pharynx).

He gained national recognition when, at sixteen, he won a vocal competition sponsored by Radio Lebanon. His winning song was "Ya Mursil al-Nagham al-Hanoun", written by the then-unknown poet, Nimatallah Habika who was a Catholic monk.

El Safi began composing and performing songs that drew upon his rural upbringing and love of traditional melodies, blended with an urban sound, and creating a new style of modernized Lebanese folk music.

In 1947, El Safi traveled to Brazil where he remained until 1950. El Safi toured the world, singing in many languages, including Arabic, Syriac, French, Portuguese and spanish, accompanied by his sons George and Antoine who played alongside him and perform backup vocals since 1978.

In the late fifties, he worked with other musicians such as Philimon Wehbe and the Rahbani brothers as well Zaki Nassif among others to revive Lebanese folk music through the Baalbeck International Festival.

== Songs and recordings ==
Wadih El Safi has sung over 5000 songs. He is well-known for his mawawil (an improvised singing style) of 'Ataba, Mijana, and Abu el Zuluf. He has performed and recorded with many well-known Lebanese musicians such as Fairouz and Sabah.

== Personal life ==
In 1952, he married his cousin Melvina Tanios Francis. They had six children: Dunia, Marlene, Fadi, Antoine, George, and Milad. After the Lebanese Civil War began, he moved to Egypt and then Paris. He held citizenship in four different countries: Lebanon, Egypt, France and Brazil.

== Health problems and death ==
In 1990, Wadih El Safi underwent open-heart surgery. In 2012, he broke his leg and had to have surgery to mend the fracture. After the surgery, his health deteriorated rapidly. In 2013, he was admitted to hospital, suffering from pulmonary consolidation. On October 11, 2013, he fell ill at his son's home and was rushed to the Bellevue Medical Center where he died. His funeral was held at Saint George Maronite Cathedral, Beirut on October 14, 2013.

== Tribute ==
On November 1, 2016, Google celebrated his 95th birthday with a Google Doodle.

== Discography ==
=== As performer ===
- Best of Wadi – Vol. 1 (EMI, 1999)
- Best of Wadi – Vol. 2
- Best of Wadi – Vol. 3
- Inta Omri (2000)
- The Two Tenors: Wadi Al Safi & Sabah Fakhri (Ark 21, 2000)
- Wadih El-Safi and José Fernandez (Elef Records)
- Wetdallou Bkheir
- Rouh ya zaman al madi atfal qana
- "W Kberna" Duet with Najwa Karam (2002)
- Chante Le Liban
- Wadi El Safi / Legends Of The 20th Century
- Mersal El Hawa
- Mahrajan Al Anwar
- Youghani Loubnan
- Ajmal El Aghani

=== As composer ===
- Cantiques de l'Orient (Harmonia Mundi Fr., 1996)
- Psaumes Pour Le 3ème Millénaire (Angel Records, 2002)

=== As sideman ===
- Music of Arabia, Hanaan and her ensemble. Request Records (New Rochelle, New York) SRLP 8083 (as Wadih El-Saffi on oud)

== See also ==
- List of Lebanese people
- Lebanon
- Fairuz
- Sabah
- Zajal
