= Ragheb Alama =

Lebanese singer-songwriter and entertainer (born 1962)

Ragheb Alama راغب علامة
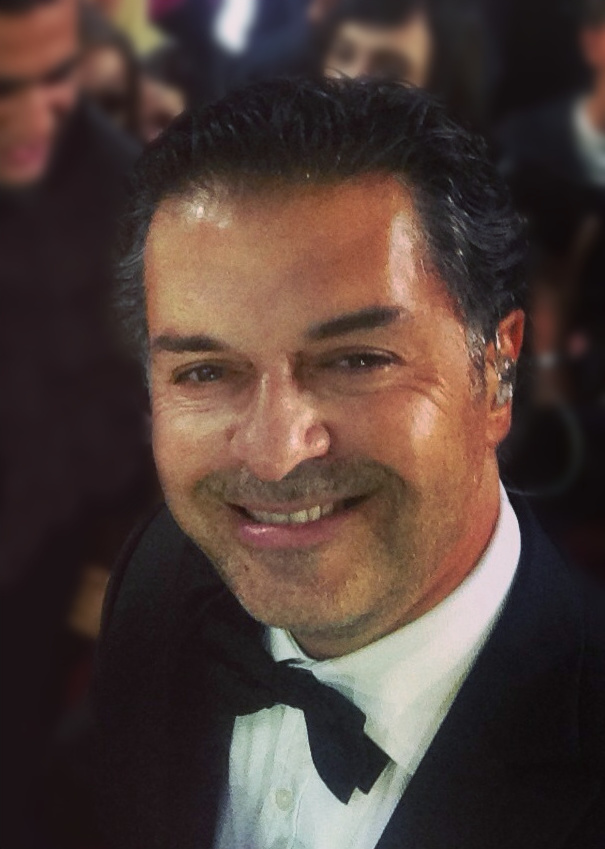
- Alama in 2014

Background information
- Also known as: "The Superstar", "The Landmark"
- Born: Ragheb Sobhi Alama راغب صبحي علامة; 7 June 1962 (age 64); Ghobeiry, Mount Lebanon, Lebanon
- Genre: Arabic pop
- Occupations: Actor, composer, singer, television personality
- Instruments: Vocals, oud
- Years active: 1982–present
- Label: Backstage Production
- Spouse: Jihan Alama (m. 1996)

Ragheb Sobhi Alama (Arabic: راغب صبحي علامة; born 7 June 1962) is a Lebanese music artist and television personality. Alama began his career in the 1980s when he appeared as a contestant on the talent show broadcast Studio El Fan, on which he received the Platinum Award.

Alama rose to fame after winning Studio El Fan, since then releasing yearly albums and number-one hit singles such as "Ya Rait" (If Only), "'Aan Jad" (Seriously) and "Alby Asheq'ha" (My Heart Adores Her), which was the first Arabic song in history to be made into a music video. Alama continued his success into the 2000s with the release of his chart-topping albums Saharony El Leil (2001), Tab Leh (2002), El Hob El Kebeer (2004) and Ba'asha'ak (2008), the latter which earned the artist the Platinum certification from Virgin Megastores for its record sales. In 2009, he is appointed as the United Nations Ambassador of Climate Change. In 2010, his album Seneen Rayha saw the artist team with Starbucks for its release and sale, making him the first Arab artist to have his album sold at Starbucks. His follow-up album Habib Dehkati also included a song featuring international pop artist Shakira.

Alama has won two Murex d'Or Awards and several other awards during his career. His albums have made him one of the most commercially successful singers in the Arab world. In mid-2011, it was announced that Alama would head the judging panel for the pan-Arab version of the American Idol series.

== Early life ==
Alama was born in Ghobeiry near Beirut, Lebanon, into a Shia family, the son of Sobhi Alama and Wafiqa Alama. He has four brothers (Mohammad, Ahmad, Khoder and Hassan) and three sisters (Sabiha, Rima, and Lina) – of which he is the middle child. His father named him after the first Lebanese judge, Ragheb Beik Alama. At eight years old, Ragheb took up playing the oud and participated in a live radio program to showcase his talent.

In 1996, he married Jihane al-Ali, who gave birth to his two sons, Khaled (born 1998) and Louai (born 2001).

== Entertainment career ==
=== 2000–2006: Tab Leh and Hob El Kebeer ===
In 2000, Alama recorded "Betgheeb Betrouh" with then-rising singer Elissa. In 2003, he released "Tab Leh" (Oh Why?) under the recording label Alam El Phan and the title track entered the number one spot for several weeks. He also featured famous Iranian-Armenian singer-songwriter Andy Madadian on a track titled "Yalla Ya Chabab" (Let's Go Guys).

At the end of 2004, he released "El Hob el Kebeer" (The Great Love) which included the hit single "Naseeni el Dunya" (Make Me Forget the World) and the title track which was released in July 2005 and directed by Wissam Smayra in a huge production shot in Malaysia.

In 2006, Alama participated in the pro-celebrity Formula One race, held in Bahrain, as an introductory show to the competition. He placed third and signed an agreement with Formula One Management to participate in the next race that was held in Shanghai, China.

=== 2008–present: Backstage Production ===
In May 2008, Ragheb Alama released Baa'sha'ak, which was certified Platinum by Virgin Megastores Dubai by April 2009 for its record sales. The album was produced by his own company Backstage Production and included the hits "Yighib" and "Ser Hobbi"

In 2010, and again under his own production company Backstage Production, Ragheb released the environment-themed album Seneen Rayha which included the number one singles "Seneen Rayha" and "Betfell". The album solidified Alama's position as the number one artist in the Arab world and was sold in all branches of Starbucks Coffee along with a B-side compilation album titled Starz Vol. 1 that included the hit collaboration with Shakira "Good Stuff (Remix)".

In 2014, Ragheb released Habib Dehkati (English: The Reason I Smile) under Backstage Production which contained fourteen songs.

=== Other work ===
Near the end of 2011, Alama was announced as the head of jury for the new MBC show Arab Idol, which is a remake of the show, American Idol. Joining Alama on the panel were Ahlam, Nancy Ajram and Hassan El Shafei. The Arab Idol team began its auditioning tour around the Middle East and the UK in September 2011.

In 2013, he was appointed by the United Nations Environmental Program (UNEP) as the Goodwill Ambassador in West Asia.

In 2015, he was a jury of The X Factor beside Elissa and Donia Samir Ghanem. In 2019, he was on the fifth season of The Voice: Ahla Sawt, leading his act Mahdi to victory.

=== Saint George Schools ===
At the beginning of his musical career in the 1980s, Ragheb Alama opened the Saint George Schools. His goal was to provide education to as many students as possible. His goal was achieved with the help of his brother, Ahmad Subhi Alama, who has been the General Manager of Saint George Schools since the beginning. Ahmad built the organization from the ground up, starting with the first Block in Haret Hreik which had nearly 200 students but has now grown to almost 2000 students spread into 4 Blocks total (1 in Haret Hreik, 2 in Hadath, and 1 in Hay el Amerkan.)

== Endorsements ==
Throughout his career, Ragheb has been endorsed by several international companies and has been the face of their many marketing campaigns. The companies that endorsed Ragheb and featured him as part of their promotions include Hublot, United Nations, Starbucks, Mercedes-Benz, Samsung, Malaysian Ministry of Tourism, Malaysia Airlines, Middle East Airlines, Persol and The Pearl Island.

== Studio albums ==
- 1986: Ya Rayt
- 1987: Al Hadiya
- 1988: Dawa el Leil
- 1989: Ma Y'gooz
- 1991: Alby Ashe'ha
- 1993: Ya Hayati
- 1995: Taw'am Ruhy
- 1996: Sayedati el Gameela
- 1997: Bravo 'Alaiky
- 1999: Habeeby Ya Nasy
- 2001: Saharooni el Leil
- 2002: Tab Leih
- 2004: El Hob el Kebeer
- 2008: Baa'sha'ak
- 2010: Seneen Rayha
- 2014: Habeeb Dehkati
