= Talal Maddah =

Saudi Arabian singer and composer (1940 - 2000)

Talal Maddah طلال مداح
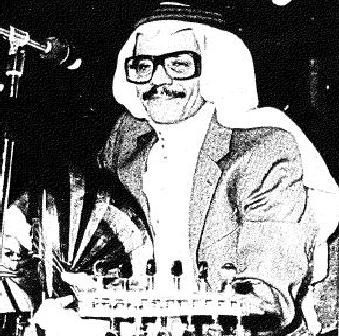

Background information
- Also known as: The Earth's Voice
- Born: Talal bin Abdul-Sheikh bin Ahmed bin Jaafar Al-Jabri; 5 August 1940; Mecca, Saudi Arabia
- Origin: Saudi Arabia
- Died: 11 August 2000 (aged 60) Abha, Saudi Arabia
- Genres: Saudi Arabian, Arabic Music
- Occupations: Singer, composer
- Instruments: Oud, guitar, violin, piano
- Years active: 1958–2000

Talal Maddah (5 August 1940 – 11 August 2000; Arabic: طلال مدَّاح) was a Saudi Arabian musician and composer . He was named Maddah after his mother's family and was commonly nicknamed as "The Earth's Voice" (Arabic: صوت الارض). He had a substantial influence over 20th century-Arabian culture.

Maddah began his career emulating Hijazi singers such as Hassan Jawa and Mohammed Ali Sindi. During his career, he participated in many festivals in Saudi Arabia between 1960 and 2000. He also participated in many festivals in the Arabian Peninsula, Egypt, Syria, Lebanon, Algeria, Tunisia and Libya.

== Professional career ==
=== Early career ===
Maddah was born in Mecca, Saudi Arabia. He was raised by his uncle.

Maddah began singing in school concerts when he was a student in Al-Taif. Abdul Rahman Khundaneh, one of Maddah's classmates, played the oud and became his accompanist. Since the two boys had to keep the oud at Maddah's house to hide it from Khundaneh's father, Maddah also learned to play the instrument.

In the mid-1950s, Maddah attended a wedding in Al-Taif that featured a selection of artists such as Tariq Abdul-Hakim, Abdullah Mohammed and Abdullah Morshidi. Maddah was astonished to see a concert with a full orchestra. At the concert, he was introduced to Abbas Fayegg Ghazzawi who was then a director at Radio Jeddah. Ghazzawi encouraged him to come to record his first songs. Maddah's first song is called "Wardak Ya Zarea Al Ward" (Grower of Roses, Arabic: وردك يا زارع الورد). The song was a success and was played on the radio daily in the mid-1950s.

In the 1960s, Talal Maddah became famous due to the birth of Saudi Arabia's official radio. Along with other artists like Muhammad Ali Sindi, Fawzi Mhasson and Abdullah Mohammed, he was one of the most popular singers of the era.

=== The Arab world ===
Gradually, his music was introduced to the rest of the Arab world after his songs were played in Cairo. Egyptian composers like Mohammed Abdel Wahab, Mohammed Al Mogy and Baligh Hamdi began to write songs for him. In 1976, he had his first pan-Arab hit with "Muqadir". Over the course of his long career, Maddah collaborated with many composers, including Ibrahim Raafat, Gamal Salama, Tariq Abdul Hakim, Abu Bakr Salem Belfkih, Sami Ihsan and Mohammed Shafiq. He also discovered and trained fellow singer Abadi al Johar.

== Talal Maddah albums ==
Maddah recorded about 66 official albums and 40 other albums. During his 50-year career, Maddah composed more than 1,000 songs.

== Death ==
Maddah, who had just celebrated his 60th birthday, collapsed and died suddenly of a heart attack on Al Meftaha Stage (Arabic: مسرح المفتاحة) in Abha in front of his fans shortly after he performed an intro to one of his famous songs. The concert was aired live on Saudi National Television. Later on, the official Saudi Press Agency made a statement confirming his death and paid tribute to him and to his legacy.

Maddah's funeral was held in the city of Jeddah. He is buried in Makkah.

== Awards ==
Maddah was the first Saudi artist to receive awards outside of Saudi Arabia. He received a Prize from Habib Bourguiba, the former president of Tunisia. Muammar Gaddafi and Hosni Mubarak also gave him awards. In 1984, King Fahd of Saudi Arabia awarded Maddah the Order of Merit of the Custodian of the Two Holy Mosques for his work.
