= Warda Al-Jazairia =

Algerian singer (1939–2012)

Warda Al-Jazairia وردة الجزائرية
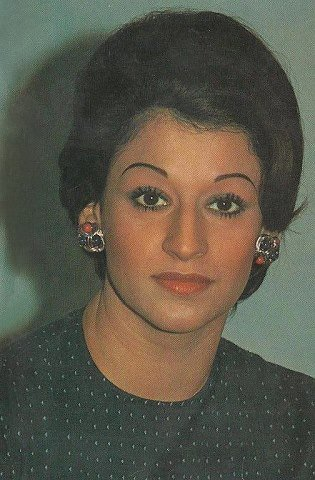
- Warda Al-Jazairia, 1977

Background information
- Born: Warda Mohammed Ftouki; 22 July 1939; Paris, France
- Died: 17 May 2012 (aged 72) Cairo, Egypt
- Genres: Egyptian music; Arabic pop
- Occupation: Singer
- Years active: 1951–1962; 1972–2012
- Labels: EMI Arabia; Virgin/EMI Records
- Spouse: Baligh Hamdi

Warda Mohammed Ftouki (Arabic: وردة محمد فتوكي; 22 July 1939 – 17 May 2012), known professionally as Warda Al-Jazairia (وردة الجزائرية, 'Rose, the Algerian' or 'the Algerian Rose', pronounced [ˈwɑrdæ l(d)ʒæzæːʔɪˈrɪjjæ]), was an Algerian singer. She was well known for her Egyptian Arabic songs and music. Her name was sometimes shortened to just Warda in the Arab world.

== Early life ==
Warda Ftouki was born in Paris, France, on July 22, 1939. Her father, Mohammed Ftouki, was an Algerian from Souk Ahras, and her mother was Lebanese. She was the youngest of five children.

Warda began singing in the 1950s. She made her debut at the Tam-Tam, a cabaret owned by her father located on rue Saint-Séverin, in the Latin Quarter; it is home to many famous stars of Arabic music, such as Safia Chamia and Farid El Atrache.

=== The TAM-TAM: Warda's first stage ===
Warda's father, Mohammed Ftouki opened the Tam-Tam in 1951. The name was derived from an acrostic of "Tunisia - Algeria - Morocco", at a time when several other establishments of the kind appeared such as El Djazaïr, El Koutoubia, and the Baghdad. The establishment quickly became very successful. Farid al-Atrash performed there. As well as Salim Al Hillali, the other souk-ahrassien, who had sung there every night for years. Receptacles and laboratories of modern Arab singers, these cabarets were also meeting places for diasporic communities where ideas circulated; genuine places of expression of thought. Thus, during the War of Liberation, the Tam-Tam became a secret address of the French Federation of the FLN, as a cache of weapons. Indeed, "Le Tam-Tam" was linked to the headquarters of the MTLD, the Movement for the Triumph of Democratic Freedoms, the political party for Algerian independence. The cabaret adjoined the MTLD headquarters and was under police surveillance. Mohammed Ftouki was subsequently denounced and imprisoned.

Following his release, he went into exile in Beirut with his family and devoted himself to the artistic training of his children, in particular Warda and Messaoud, a percussionist and composer. Both Warda and her brother's talents thrived thanks to the devoted efforts of their father. Mohammed Ftouki died in Cairo in 1961 where he is buried.

== Career ==
=== Career beginnings ===
At the age of 11, Warda sang in a show hosted by Ahmed Hachlaf, which was broadcast on Paris Inter. In 1950, she recorded her first record for Pathé-Marconi.

In 1956, after the outbreak of the Algerian war, weapons intended for the FLN (Algerian National Liberation Front) were discovered by the police in her father's cabaret. The establishment was closed, and their family expelled. They made plans to move to Hamra, a district of Beirut known for its nightlife. However, her mother died before they could arrive.

Warda sang in Beirut's cabarets. In 1959, at a casino in Aley, she met the composer Mohammed Abdel Wahab, who taught her the art of classical singing and adapted the poet Ahmed Shawqi's qasida "Bi-Omri Kullo Habbitak" for her. This led to her introduction to the Egyptian president, Gamal Abdel Nasser, who suggested that she be cast in a pan-Arab opera and perform the song "Al Watan Al Akbar" by Mohammed Abdel Wahab. Warda recorded it, as did other singers such as Abdel Halim Hafez and Fayza Ahmed. The Egyptian director of musicals, Helmy Rafla, signed her to a contract, enabling her to pursue a musical and film career in Egypt. She appeared in two of Rafla's films, "Almaz We Abdo El-Hamouly" and "Amirat al-Arab."

=== Career interruption ===
Warda's father died in 1961. After independence, she went to Algeria for the first time and married an officer who forbade her to sing. She took a ten-year hiatus from music, instead choosing to raise her children. She had a daughter named Widad and a son named Riad, who was named after the composer Riad Al Sunbati.

=== Return to singing ===
In 1972, at the request of Algerian president Houari Boumédiène, Warda took part in the commemoration of the 10th anniversary of Algeria's independence by performing in Algiers with an Egyptian orchestra.

Following that performance, Warda and her husband divorced by mutual consent, and she decided to resume her career. She returned permanently to Egypt, where she married the composer Baligh Hamdi. She enjoyed great popularity and had the opportunity to work with the greatest Arab composers, such as Helmi Bakr, Riad Al Sunbati, Sadok Thraya, Mohammed Abdel Wahab, Mohammed Al-Mougi, and Sayed Mekawy. Egyptian president Anwar Sadat banned her from performing in Egypt because a song from her repertoire, "Inkan el-Ghala Yenzad", praised the Libyan leader Muammar Gaddafi. The ban was lifted thanks to the intervention of his wife Jehan.

In 1979, Warda returned to France to give a recital at the Olympia.

=== 1990s–2000s ===
In 1990, Warda divorced her second husband, who died in Paris three years later. Her career went into eclipse as new musical styles emerged. However, she was able to return to the forefront due to her popular performances of songs by the composer Salah El-Sharnoubi, such as "Harramt Ahebak", "Batwanes Beek", and "Ya Khsara".

She began to develop health problems, which kept her away from the stage. In 1996, she underwent heart surgery, which was followed by a liver transplant in the early 2000s.

In 1999, a Best Of compilation called Nagham El-Hawa was released, which featured her most popular songs. Her last studio album was recorded in 2001.

Warda visited Lebanon in the 2000s to perform at the Baalbeck International Festival. She sang there in 2005 and again in 2008, attracting nearly 3,000 spectators. That same year, she travelled to Algeria and gave various concerts in Djemila, at the Casif Theatre in Sidi Fredj, and at the 4th International Festival. In 2009, Warda took part in the opening night of the 2nd Pan-African Festival in Algiers. She also performed in Morocco during the 8th edition of the Mawazine, where she sang in front of 30,000 people. One of her last concerts took place in Lebanon in September 2011.

== Political engagement ==
The first song Warda recorded in the 1950s was a patriotic Algerian song. She later sang songs celebrating the struggle and independence of Algeria, such as Saïdouna Ila El Djibal, Min baide (From afar), Aid El Karama (The Festival of Dignity), Soummam and Biladi Ouhibouki. Before her death, the singer made a video-clip entitled Mazal wakfin (We are still standing), celebrating the fiftieth anniversary of independence.

== Death and aftermath ==
Warda died on 17 May 2012 at her home in Cairo following a cardiac arrest that occurred during her sleep. She was 72 years old. Her body was flown back to her homeland, Algeria, and she was given a state funeral. She was buried on 19 May in the "Martyrs' Square" of the El Alia Cemetery in Algiers, which is reserved for national heroes.

Her death interrupted the filming of the music video for the song "Eyyam", directed by Mounes Khammar. In May 2013, the music video was presented to the press. The sequences featuring the missing singer were digitally inserted using the animation technique, rotoscoping. The song, which was composed by Bilal Zain and written by lyricist Mounir Bou Assaf, was recorded in 2009.

== Legacy ==
=== Musical style and posterity ===
The musicologist Daniel Caux considered Warda to have possessed all the qualities necessary for a singer from the Arab world. He emphasized the accuracy of her intonation, her sense of rhythm and her mastery of nuances, in particular, which he thought enriched her singing. According to Caux, Warda succeeds in combining power and delicacy.

Warda was one of the few singers renowned throughout the Arab world, from the Maghreb to the Mashriq. She is considered a "diva" of Arab song, in the same way as Umm Kulthum, Sabah, and Fairuz. Her repertoire includes more than 300 songs. During her career, Warda has sold tens of millions of albums.

=== Tributes ===
On 10 March 2018, the Ensemble Mazzika in Paris paid tribute to Warda in a concert at the Cabaret Sauvage.

On 30 November 2019, a concert in tribute to Warda was organised by the Ensemble Mazzika and the Lebanese singer Ranine Chaar at the Bataclan Theatre in Paris.

On 2021, the Arab World Institute in Paris paid tribute to "The Arab World Divas", among them, Warda. The exhibition displayed the greatest female Arab artists in the 20th century, legendary artists, timeless icons, all the actresses and singers who took part in the evolution of the post-war Arabic societies and who remain references idolized by everyone.

Warda was a gourmet cook, and did not let being a Muslim stand in the way of using wine in cooking. She told the Egyptian newspaper Al-Akhbar, at her home overlooking the Nile, she loved: "Cooking, looking after my beloved cats and listening to old songs."

== Distinctions ==
In November 2004, on the fiftieth anniversary of the Algerian Revolution, Warda was awarded the El-Athir Medal of the Order of National Merit. In 2009, she was made Commander of the Moroccan Order of Ouissam Alaouite on the instructions of King Mohammed VI, and the Wali of Rabat gave her the keys to the city. In 2012, she was appointed by the French President Nicolas Sarkozy to the rank of Knight of the Order of Arts and Letters.

In 2021, the singer was included in the list of 318 Heroes of Diversity appointed by the government of President Emmanuel Macron. The singer was one of 251 men and 67 women, representative of "territorial diversity", who may inspire future street names or public buildings in France. Among the nominees are great names from literature, art, politics and science, including Emile Zola, Guillaume Apollinaire, Dalida, Serge Gainsbourg, Léopold Sédar Senghor, Salvador Dalí, Pablo Picasso and Emir Abdel Kader.

== Filmography ==
Warda has appeared in several film and television productions, including:

=== Film ===
- 1962: Almaz wa Abdou Alhamoli (ألمظ وعبده الحامولي) with Adel Mamoun
- 1963: Amirat Al Arab (أميرة العرب)
- 1973: Sout Al Hob (The Voice of Love) with Hassan Yousef
- 1974 : Hekayti maa al-Zaman (حكايتي مع الزمان) with Rushdie Abaza
- 1977 : Ah ya leil ya zaman
- 1993: Lih Ya Donia

=== Television ===
- 1979: Awraq el Ward (أوراق الورد, Rose petals) with Omar al-Hariri
- 2006: Han al Awan (آن الأوان, Le Temps est venu) by Youssef Maati, directed by Ahmad Sakr

== Bibliography ==
- Andrew Hammond, Pop Culture Arab World! Media, Arts, and Lifestyle, ABC-CLIO, 2005, 376 p. (ISBN 9781851094493, read online [archive].), p. 170-171.
