= Ahlam (singer) =

Emirati actress and singer (born 1968)

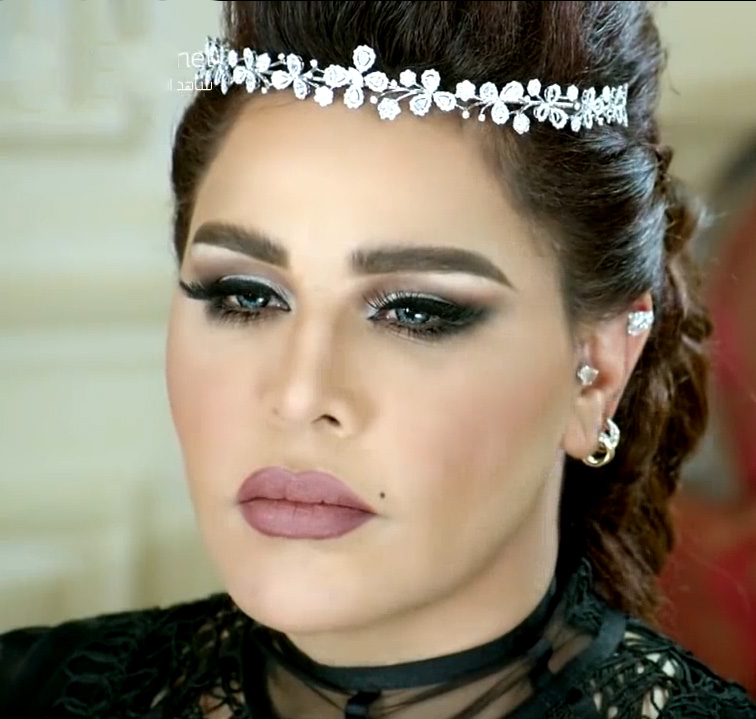
- Ahlam in 2014
- Born: Ahlam bint Ali bin Hazeem Al Shamsi أحلام بنت علي بن هزيم الشامسي; 13 February 1968 (age 58); Abu Dhabi, Trucial States
- Occupations: Singer and actress
- Years active: 1995–present
- Spouse: Mubarak Al-Hajiri
- Children: 3
- Musical career
- Genres: Classical Arabic, Khaliji, Pop
- Labels: Funoon Al Emarat; Alam El Phan; Rotana; Queen International
- Website: http://ahlam-alshamsi.com/

Ahlam bint Ali bin Hazeem Al Shamsi (Arabic: أحلام بنت علي بن هزيم الشامسي; born 13 February 1968), better known mononymously as Ahlam (Arabic: أحلام), is an Emirati singer and actress. She has released a total of 14 albums and numerous singles. In 2011, Ahlam joined MBC's Arab Idol judging panel, for the inaugural season and the following three seasons. She was also judge and coach for season 4 in The Voice: Ahla Sawt singing competition.

== Biography ==
Ahlam bint Ali bin Hazeem Al Shamsi was born in Abu Dhabi, United Arab Emirates, to an Emirati father and a Bahraini mother. Her father is an Emirati folk singer, Ali Al Shamsi. Ahlam was raised as a child in Bahrain. She is married to the Qatari rally champion, Mubarak Al-Hajiri, with whom she has three children, Fahed (born 2004), Fatima (2008) and Lulwa (2010).

Ahlam began performing at weddings and small private gatherings during her youth, with her musical style rooted in the Khaleeji tradition.

Her breakthrough came in the mid-1990s when music producers recognized the potential of her voice and stage presence. She subsequently signed her first professional recording contract and released her debut album, Ahbak Moot (I Love You to Death), in 1995, which quickly gained popularity.

Ahlam’s career developed rapidly, with her early music combining traditional Khaleeji (Gulf) sounds with contemporary pop. This fusion resonated with audiences, while her powerful voice, marked by its rich tone and emotional delivery, helped distinguish her in an industry largely dominated by male performers.

During the late 1990s and early 2000s, she released a series of successful albums, including Ma Yeseh Ela Al Saheeh (Only the Truth Matters) and Akher Gharam (Last Love). Her music received recognition for its lyrical depth and wide vocal range, helping her build a strong and dedicated fan base.

By the early 2000s, Ahlam had become a prominent name in Arabic music. She performed at major festivals, including the Carthage Festival in Tunisia, the Jerash Festival in Jordan, and the Hala February Festival in Kuwait, further establishing her reputation as one of the leading figures in the Arab music scene.

She participated in many festivals around the Arab region and Western region, particularly the "Layali Dubai" festival. She has also been honored at several festivals across the Arab region and in the USA including at the Dolby Theatre. She was crowned queen of Arab art in the Doha-Qatar Festival in 2003. She performed at the UNESCO Festival and Ledo Festival in France where she was the first Arab singer to sing twice. She also had performances at the Washington Festival in the US, the Albert Hall Festival in the UK and many other festivals in London.

In 2011, Ahlam joined MBC's Arab Idol judging panel alongside Lebanese singers Wael Kfoury and Nancy Ajram and Egyptian composer Hassan El Shafei. She stayed in the position for 4 consecutive seasons 1-4 broadcast 2012-2014 and 2017. She was also a judge and a coach in 2018 for season 4 of The Voice: Ahla Sawt singing competition.

In March 2016, after the first episode of her show The Queen was broadcast on Dubai TV, a trending Twitter hashtag demanding that the program be stopped for moral reasons such as "lack of manners" and displaying "degrading acts". Several Lebanese journalists and known personalities took the opportunity to further criticize her for her opinions about the Lebanese including a Twitter hashtag to prevent her from entering Lebanon and other Arab countries. The program was dropped one episode by the Khaleeji broadcaster.

In February 2018, Dar of Al-Teeb Perfumes launched a new fragrance named "Ahlam" with a promotional campaign. The promotional video for the perfume, filmed in France, featured her portraying an artist in an interview with a French TV channel. When asked by the host about her secret, she replied, "My secret is my perfume." In November 2021, she launched her second perfume titled "Noor Jihan," which she described as "made from special Indian roses."

In 2022, Ahlam joined the panel of Saudi Idol, alongside Aseel Abu Bakr, Assala and Majid al Mohandis.

== Discography ==
=== Albums ===
- أحبك موت (I Love You Till Death) (1995)
- مع السلامة (Goodbye) (1996)
- كيف ارضى (How Do I Accept) (1997)
- ما يصح الا الصحيح (Nothing is Right But Right) (1998)
- طبيعي (Natural) (1999)
- مختلف (Different) (2000)
- لعلمك بس (Just To Let You Know) (2001)
- أحسن (Better) (2003)
- الثقل صنعه (Weight) (2006)
- هذا أنا (This Is Me) (2009)
- موعدك (Your Time) (2013)
- أبتحداك (Challenge You) (2015)
- يلازمني خيالك (Your Fantasy Is Living With Me) (2016)
- فدوة عيونك (Love Of Your Eyes) (2021)

== Awards and nominations ==
She was rewarded by the Minister of Foreign Affairs in the United Arab Emirates by his Highness Sheikh Abdullah bin Zayed at the "Lamst Wafa" honouring Event. On July 21, 2011, it was announced that Ahlam would be on the judging panel of "Arab Idol", the Arabic version of the American Idol. Based on online statistics, Ahlam is first in terms of social media followers in the Middle East, one of the most active people online and her name has been one of the most searched keywords in the Google search engine.

In 2024, she won a Murex d'Or award.
