= Alam =

Family name, Arabic term, and type of insignia

Alam is a masculine name derived from several ancient languages.

== Derivations ==
Alam may derive from::

1. Arabic: عالم (Ālam) meaning 'world' or 'universe'
2. Hebrew: cognate word עולם is transcribed as Olam or Ulam, also meaning 'World'
3. Tagalog: Alam means 'Knowledge' (Wisdom); adjective maalam is referred to as the one who is knowledgeable and wise.
4. Bengali: Alom means 'the whole world' or 'world'.
5. Malay: Alam means 'Field of interest', 'nature', 'realm', 'world'. Ilmu alam means 'Natural Studies' or 'Geography'.
6. Hindi: Alam means 'the whole world' or 'world'.
7. Urdu: Alam means 'the whole world' or 'world'.

== Use in literature ==
Arabic literature and ancient texts use Alam in phrases like "Rab-ul-Alam-een" = "the Lord of all Worlds/Universes" referring to The Absolute and Highest Divinity.

In Hebrew, Olam is used in phrases like "Adon Olam", meaning "Master of the World," one of the names of God in Judaism.

== People with the surname ==
=== Surname عالم ('world') ===
- Intikhab Alam (born 1941), British Indian (Pakistani) cricketer
- MM Alam (1935–2013), Pakistani flying ace
- Said Alam, Pakistani pediatric surgeon and political activist

=== Other surnames transliterated as Alam ===
- Abdul Qadir Alam, governor of Ghor Province, Afghanistan
- Mustafa Ali (Adeel Alam, born 1986), Pakistani-American wrestler
- Aftab Alam (disambiguation), several people
- Aftabuddin Alam (born 1993), Indian cricketer
- Ahmed Alam (born 1972), field hockey player
- Alexander Alam (1896–1983), Australian businessman, politician, and philanthropist
- Amir-Hossein Khozeimé Alam (1919–2002), eldest son of Amir Ma'soum Khan Khozeiméh
- Ammad Alam (born 1998), Pakistani cricketer
- Arish Alam (born 1986), Indian cricketer
- Ashraful Alam (educationist), Bangladeshi educationist and vice chancellor of Sylhet International University
- Hero Alom (Ashraful Alom, born 1982), Bangladeshi media personality and politician
- Asadollah Alam (1919–1978), Iranian politician
- A. T. M. Zahirul Alam (born 1952), retired lieutenant general of Bangladesh Army
- Ava Alam (1947–1976), Bangladeshi singer and music teacher
- Badiul Alam (born 1949), Bangladeshi academic
- Didarul Alam (born 1968), Bangladesh Awami League politician
- Faisal Alam (born 1977), gay Pakistani American who founded the Al-Fatiha Foundation
- Fakrul Alam (born 1951), Bangladeshi academic, writer, and translator
- Fareena Alam (born 1978), English journalist and was editor
- Faria Alam (born 1966), Bangladeshi society figure and television personality
- Faruque Alam (1940–2020), Bangladeshi civil engineer and wood technologist
- Fawad Alam (born 1985), Pakistani cricketer and actor
- Fouad Salam Alam (born 1951), Egyptian volleyball player
- Ghulam Dastagir Alam (1933–2000), Pakistani theoretical physicist and professor
- Gulzar Alam (born 1959), Pashto singer
- Gurdas Ram Alam (1912–1989), Punjabi language poet
- Ikhfanul Alam (born 1984), Indonesian footballer
- Israfil Alam (born 1966), Bangladesh Awami League Politician
- Jafar Alam (born 1957), Bangladeshi politician
- Jahanara Alam (born 1993), Bangladeshi cricketer
- Javeed Alam (1943–2016), activist and thinker
- Johnny Alam, Canadian researcher, visual artist, and curator
- Khorshed Alam (1935–2021), fifth Governor of Bangladesh Bank
- Khurshid Alam (born 1940s), Bangladeshi playback singer
- Leena Alam (born 1978)
- Leon Alam (born 1996), German politician
- Sayful Alam (1934–1997), Bangladeshi politician and teacher
- Mohammad Shahid Alam, Pakistani economist, academic, and social scientist
- Mohammad Habibul Alam, Vice-chairman of the World Scout Committee
- Mozaffar Alam (1882–1973), Iranian military and political figure
- Nawab Alam Yar Jung Bahadur (1890–1970), Indian politician
- Qasa Alom, British-Bangladeshi journalist and presenter

=== Compound names ===
- Alamgir
- Badrul Alam (disambiguation)
- Jahangir Alam (disambiguation)
- Mahbubul Alam (disambiguation)
- Nurul Alam (disambiguation)
- Shamsul Alam (disambiguation)

== People with the given name ==
=== Given name عالم ('world') ===
- Alam Channa (1953–1998), son of Nasir Channa of Dhoke Kashmirian was the world's tallest living man at 232.4 cm (7 ft 7 inch) high. During his life he had been billed at various heights of up to 7 ft 6 while working at a circus
- Alam Lohar (1928–1979), prominent Punjabi folk music from the Punjab region of Pakistan, formerly British India. He is credited with popularising the musical term Jugni
- Alom Shaha (born 1973), British-Bangladeshi teacher, writer and filmmaker

=== Other given names transliterated as Alam ===
- Alam al-Din al-Hanafi (1178–1251), Egyptian mathematician, astronomer and engineer
- Alam al-Malika (died 1130), leader of Zubayd in Yemen
- Alam Dad Lalika (born 1987), Pakistani politician
- Alam Khan (actor), Indian actor, model, and dancer
- Alam Khan (composer), Bangladeshi composer and music director
- Alam Khattak, Pakistani army general
- Alam Gul Kuchi, Afghan politician
- Alam Mir (born 1944)
- Alam Muzaffarnagari (1901–1969), pseudonym of Muhammad Ishaaq, Indian poet
- Alam Shah, the fourth and last ruler of the Sayyid dynasty
- Alam Zeb (athlete) (born 1930), Pakistani middle-distance runner

== Fictional characters ==
- Alam Ara, eponymous protagonist of a 1931 film directed by Ardeshir Irani, the first Indian sound film

== See also ==
- Alama, a given name and surname
- Alamabad (disambiguation)
- Alamal (disambiguation) (al-amal "hope" or al-ʿamal "work")
