= Alamgir =

Alamgir or Alomgir may refer to:

== People ==
=== Regnal title ===
- Aurangzeb (1618–1707), also known by his regnal title Alamgir, ruler of the Mughal Empire

=== Given name ===
- Alamgir II (1699–1759), also known as Aziz-ud-Din, ruler of the Mughal Empire 1754–1759
- Alamgir Mohammad Mahfuzullah Farid, Bangladeshi politician
- Alamgir Haq (born 1955), pioneer of pop music in Pakistan, known mononymously as Alamgir
- Alamgir Hashmi (born 1951), British-Pakistani poet and writer
- Alamgir Hasan (born 1970), Bangladeshi footballer
- Alamgir Hossain (politician) (fl. 1988–1990), Bangladeshi politician
- Alamgir Hossain (hurdler), Bangladeshi hurdler - see 2017 Asian Athletics Championships – Men's 400 metres hurdles
- Alamgir Kabir (disambiguation), multiple people
- Alamgir Karim, American physicist
- Alamgir Khan (disambiguation), multiple people
- Alamgir Kumkum (1942–2012), Bangladeshi filmmaker, producer and director
- Alomgir Molla (born 2000), Bangladeshi footballer
- Alamgir Muhammad Serajuddin (born 1937), Bangladeshi academic and vice-chancellor
- Alamgir Sheriyar (born 1973), British-Pakistani cricketer
- Alamgir Siddique (1926–1977), Bangladeshi politician and language activist
- Alamgir Tareen (1959–2023), Pakistani businessman

=== Surname ===
- Akhtaruzzaman Alamgir, Bangladeshi politician
- ATM Alamgir (1950–2020), Bangladeshi politician, advocate and freedom fighter
- Gazi Alamgir (born 1982), Bangladeshi first-class cricketer
- Jalal Alamgir (1971–2011), Bangladeshi professor of political science
- Md. Alamgir (born 1962), Election Commissioner of Bangladesh
- Mirza Fakhrul Islam Alamgir (born 1948), President of Bangladesh
- Mohiuddin Ahmad Alamgir (born 1950), also known as Alamgir (actor), Bangladeshi actor
- Muhammed Alamgir (born 1963), Bangladeshi academic and vice-chancellor
- Muhiuddin Khan Alamgir (born 1942), Home Affairs Minister of Bangladesh
- Niloy Alamgir (born 1984), Bangladeshi model and actor
- Shah Alamgir (1957–2019), director-general of the Press Institute of Bangladesh
- Syed Alamgir (born 1951), Bangladeshi business executive

== Pakistan Navy warships ==
- PNS Alamgir (F260), a U.S. Navy frigate transferred to the Pakistan Navy
- PNS Alamgir (D160), U.S. Navy destroyer transferred to the Pakistan Navy

== Villages in Punjab, India ==
- Alamgir, Bhogpur
- Alamgir, Kapurthala
- Alamgir (Ludhiana West)

== Other uses ==
- Alamgir Mosque, Varanasi, India
- Alamgir Mosque, Aurangabad, India
- Alamgir Tower Lahore, a building in the Pakistani state of Punjab
- Alamgir Welfare Trust, Pakistani charity
- Alamgir Town Halt railway station in the Pakistani state of Punjab

== See also ==
- Sarai Alamgir, a village in the Pakistani state of Punjab
  - Sarai Alamgir Tehsil, an administrative subdivision in the Pakistani state of Punjab
  - Sarai Alamgir railway station
- Alamgeer, a Hindi play by Indian writer Bhisham Sahni
