= Badr (Arabic name) =

Badr or Badre is a unisex given name and surname of Arabic origin. Notable people with the name include:

== Given name ==
=== Badr ===
- Badr Abdelatty (born 1966), Egyptian diplomat and politician
- Badr Ahmad (born 1979), Yemeni writer
- Badr al-Maluk Bamdad (1898–1987), Iranian journalist, teacher, and women's rights activist
- Badr Bashir (born 1997), Saudi footballer
- Badr Benoun (born 1993), Moroccan footballer
- Badr Bilal (born 1962), Qatari footballer
- Badr Bilal (Emirati footballer) (born 1996), Emirati footballer
- Badr Boulahroud (born 1993), Moroccan footballer
- Badr bin Hamad Al Busaidi (born 1960), Omani diplomat and politician
- Badr bin Saud al Busaidi (died 2023), Omani politician
- Badr Gaddarine (born 1997), Moroccan footballer
- Badr al-Zaman Gharib (1929–2020), Iranian linguist
- Badr Hamed (born 1959), Egyptian footballer
- Badr al-Hammami (died 923), Abbasid general and governor
- Badr Hari (born 1984), Moroccan-Dutch kickboxer
- Badr ibn Hasanwayh (died 1014), ruler of the Hasanwayhids
- Badr Jafar (born 1979), Emirati businessman
- Badr Jajarmi (died 1287), Persian poet
- Badr al-Jamali (died 1094), Fatimid military commander and statesman
- Badr ul-Alam Syarif Hasyim Jamaluddin, sultan of Aceh
- Badr El Kaddouri (born 1981), Moroccan footballer
- Badr Jahan Khanom (1771–??), Iranian royal consort
- Badr Lama (1907–1947), Palestinian actor
- Badr Mohammed Al Meer, Qatari businessman
- Badr Mirza (born 1984), Emirati racing cyclist
- Badr al-Molouk (1897–1979), Iranian queen consort
- Badr al-Mu'tadidi (died 912), Abbasid military commander
- Badr Zaki Nacer (born 1988), Moroccan footballer
- Badr Salem Nayef (born 1972), Qatari-Bulgarian weightlifter
- Badr El Ouazni (born 1991), Italian footballer
- Badr bin Saif (died 1806), Omani regent
- Badr bin Abdul Mohsen Al Saud (1949–2024), Saudi prince, poet, and painter
- Badr bin Abdulaziz Al Saud (1932–2013), Saudi royal
- Badr bin Abdullah Al Saud (born 1985), Saudi businessman and politician
- Badr bin Muhammad Al Saud, Saudi royal
- Badr bin Saud Al Saud (1934–2004), Saudi royal
- Badr bin Sultan Al Saud (born 1980), Saudi royal
- Badr Shakir al-Sayyab (1926–1964), Iraqi poet
- Badr Khan Shahsevan, Iranian tribal leader
- Badr Shirvani (1387–1450), Persian poet
- Badr Siwane (born 1994), Moroccan triathlete
- Badr Al-Sulaitin (born 1990), Saudi footballer
- Badr ul-Alam Syah (died 1765), sultan of Aceh
- Badr Khan Ustajlu, Turkoman military officer and governor
- Badr Al-Yaqoub (1946–2025), Kuwaiti academic and politician

=== Badre ===
- Badre Alam (born 1992), Indian cricketer

== Surname ==
=== Badr ===
- Ageel bin Muhammad al-Badr (born 1973), Yemeni royal
- Ahmad bin Ibrahim Badr (1920–2009), Saudi artist
- Bashir Badr (1935–2026), Indian poet
- Ibrahim Badr, Lebanese musician
- Jamaluddin Badr, Afghan politician
- Kamal Badr (born 1954), Lebanese academic
- Liana Badr (born 1950), Palestinian writer
- Mai Badr (born 1968), Syrian-British journalist
- Mohamed Badr (born 1929), Egyptian wrestler
- Muhammad al-Badr (1926−1996), Yemeni king and Zaydi Imam
- Nusrat Badr (died 2020), Indian lyricist
- Sara Badr (born 1987), Egyptian squash player
- Sawsan Badr (born 1959), Egyptian actress
- Shafiq Badr (died 2013), Lebanese politician
- Wael Badr (born 1978), Egyptian basketball player
- Zaki Badr (1926–1997), Egyptian politician
