= IFCO =

IFCO may refer to:

- Independent Filmmakers Cooperative of Ottawa, a co-operative that supports independent filmmakers in Ottawa
- Interreligious Foundation for Community Organization, an international religious and political organization
- Irish Film Classification Office, an organisation responsible for film and some video game classification and censorship within the Republic of Ireland
- IFCO RPC, a type of packaging
