= Olam =

Olam may refer to:

- Olam International, a food and agri-business company
- Olam (network), a network of Jewish and Israeli development and humanitarian organizations
- Justin Olam (born 1993), Papua New Guinean rugby league footballer
- Olam.uz, a former Uzbek internet portal

== See also ==
- Alam, a name
- El (deity), or El olam
