= Shah Alam (disambiguation) =

Shah Alam is a city in Malaysia.

Shah Alam may also refer to:

== People ==
- Shah Alam I (1643–1712), seventh Mughal emperor
- Shah Alam II (1728–1806), sixteenth Mughal emperor
- Shah Alam (Indian politician) (born 1973), Indian politician
- Shah Alam (Bangladeshi politician) (fl. 1988–1991)
- Shah Alam (Bangladeshi politician, born 1951)
- Shah Alam (CPB politician)
- Shah Alam (filmmaker) (born 1981), Indian social activist and documentary film maker
- Shah Alam Khan (1921–2017), Indian industrialist
- Mohamed Shah Alam (1962–1989), Bangladeshi sprinter
- Mohammad Shah Alam (academic) (1951–2020), Bangladeshi law professor

== Places ==
- Shah Alam (federal constituency), Malaysia
- Shah Alam, Tank, an administrative unit in Pakistan

== See also ==
- Ali Shahalom (born 1992), British-Bangladeshi comedian and presenter
- Shah (disambiguation)
- Alam (disambiguation)
