= Habibul =

Habibul is a Bengali name. Notable people with the name include:

- Habibul Ahsan, Bangladeshi epidemiologist
- Mohammad Habibul Alam, Bangladeshi politician
- Habibul Bashar (born 1972), Bangladeshi cricketer
- Habibul Islam Habib, Bangladeshi politician
- Syed Habibul Haque, Bangladeshi politician
