= The Official Lebanese Top 20 =

Lebanese music chart

- Country: Lebanon

Links
- Website: website

The Official Lebanese Top 20 is the first weekly chart in Lebanon, listing the most popular local and international hits across the country. The songs' popularity is solely determined by radio airplay frequency throughout a given week, audited and compiled by Ipsos SA. The Official Lebanese Top 20 was created by John Saad, an established Lebanese TV and radio personality. It is distributed through at least five media outlets ranging from TV stations to magazines and newspapers.

== Media partners ==
The Official Lebanese Top 20 can be heard every Sunday from 7pm on Sawt El Ghad 96.7FM, every Monday from 7pm on Mix FM 104.4FM, and every Friday from 5:30pm on Radio Liban 98.5FM ! It is also published & distributed weekly via all the Media Partners (Lebtivity, Beiruting, Agenda Culturel, Bisara7a, VDL24 & Ici Beyrouth), OMG LEDs, OLT20 Mobile App, and on Location).

- Murr Television
- Mix FM Lebanon
- NRJ Lebanon
- Sawt Al Ghad
- The Daily Star
- Agenda Culturel
- L'Hebdo Magazine
- Nadine Magazine
- Mondanité Magazine
- OMG - Outdoor Media Group
- Grand Cinemas
- Disc Jockey
- Born Interactive
- Beiruting
- Purple
- Apps2you

== Number-one songs ==
- List of number-one songs of 2018 (Lebanon)
