= Identiv =

American internet-of-things company

Identiv, Inc.
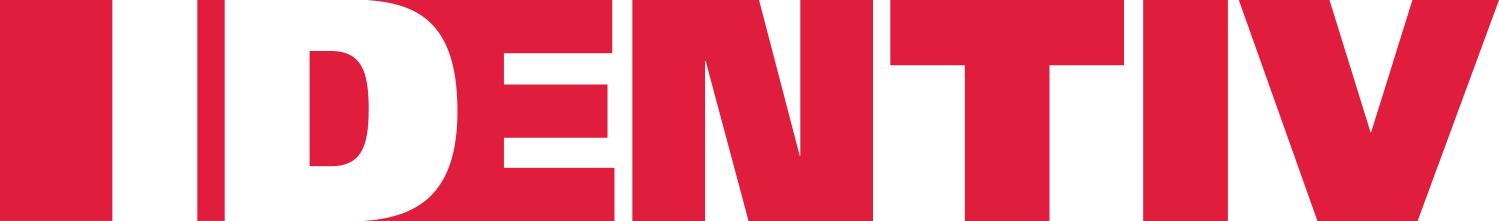
- Traded as: Nasdaq: INVE
- ISIN: ISIN: US45170X2053
- Industry: Technology
- Founded: 1990
- Headquarters: Fremont, California, United States
- Key people: Kirsten Newquist, CEO
- Revenue: ▲$116.38m (2023)
- Net income: ▼$5.49m (2023)
- Total assets: ▲$109.72m (2023)
- Number of employees: 394
- Website: https://www.identiv.com/

Identiv (originally SCM Microsystems) is a publicly traded Internet of Things technology company listed on the Nasdaq stock market.

Identiv provides physical and digital products utilizing radio frequency identification (RFID) subsets such as near field communication (NFC), Bluetooth low-energy (BLE) as well as others. The company is focused on Internet of Things (IoT) applications. The company has customers in the government, enterprise, consumer, education, healthcare and transportation sectors.

Identiv is headquartered in Fremont, California, and has additional locations in the Americas, Europe, the Middle East, and the Asia-Pacific.

== History ==
Identiv was founded in 1990 in Munich, Germany as SCM Microsystems GmbH. It received venture capital from Index Ventures and made its initial public offering on the Nasdaq stock market in 1997, then headquartered in California, USA.

In 2009, SCM Microsystems merged with Hirsch Electronics and acquired Bluehill ID. The new combination was renamed to Identive Group, shortened to Identiv in 2014. In 2018, Identiv acquired Thursby Software Systems and 3VR. In 2025, Identiv collaborated with IFCO to enhance digital traceability in the global fresh grocery supply chain, and with Novanta to advance RFID technology adoption for healthcare OEMs.
