= Shipping container =

Heavy duty container used for shipping

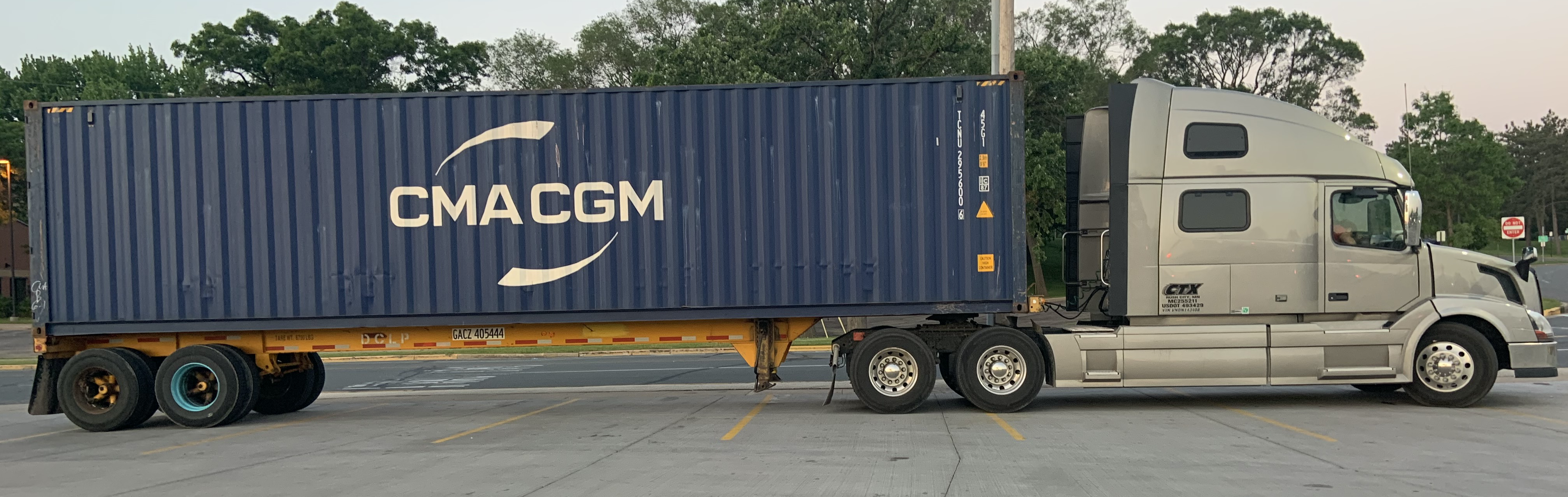
40 foot container

A shipping container is a container with strength suitable to withstand shipment, storage, and handling. Shipping containers range from large reusable steel boxes used for intermodal shipments to the ubiquitous corrugated boxes. In the context of international shipping trade, "container" or "shipping container" is virtually synonymous with intermodal freight container (sometimes informally called a "sea can"), a container designed to be moved from one mode of transport to another without unloading and reloading.

== Intermodal freight containers ==
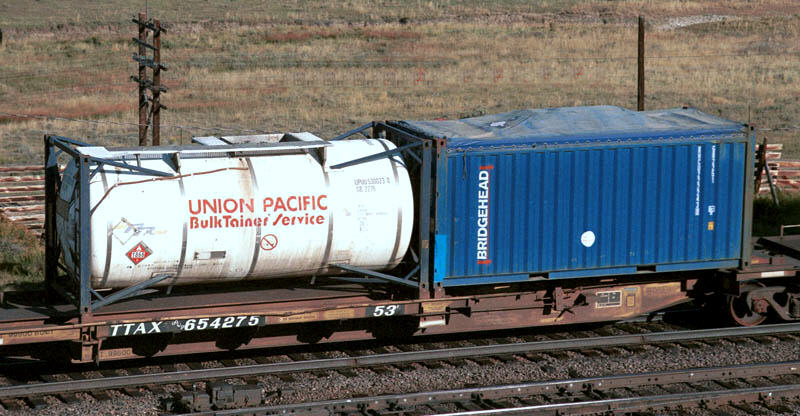
A flatcar with a 20 ft tanktainer and an open-top 20 ft container with canvas cover

Freight containers are a reusable transport and storage unit for moving products and raw materials between locations or countries. There are about seventeen million intermodal containers in the world, and a large proportion of the world's long-distance freight generated by international trade is transported in shipping containers. In addition, it is estimated that several million of these containers have now been discarded due to the shipping cost of sending them back to their port of origin. Their invention made a major contribution to the globalization of commerce in the second half of the 20th century, dramatically reducing the cost of transporting goods and hence of long-distance trade.

Specialized shipping containers include: high cube containers (providing an extra 1 ft (305 mm) in height to standard shipping containers), pallet wides, open tops, side loaders, double door or tunnel-tainers, and temperature controlled containers. Another specialized container, known as Transtainer, is a portable fuel and oil freight container. The hybrid bulk fuel tank is originally intended for the construction, mining, logging and farming sectors. The tank can be used to transport and store bulk fuels as well as dangerous liquids, by road, rail and sea. Sea containers are crucial for modern logistics, offering a cost-effective storage and shipping solution. These durable containers, designed for international transportation, provide secure storage for goods with robust steel construction. Beyond shipping, they find applications in on-site storage and modular living or workspaces. Sea containers for sale provide an accessible and convenient solution, meeting diverse needs and promoting sustainability through their reuse.

Reusable steel boxes for use as truck-sized shipping containers first came into use around 1956. It took some time for businesses to devise a structured process to utilize and to get optimal benefits from the role and use of shipping containers. Over time, the invention of the modern telecommunications of the late 20th-century made it highly beneficial to have standardized shipping containers, and made these shipping processes more standardized, modular, easier to schedule and easier to manage.

== Corrugated box ==
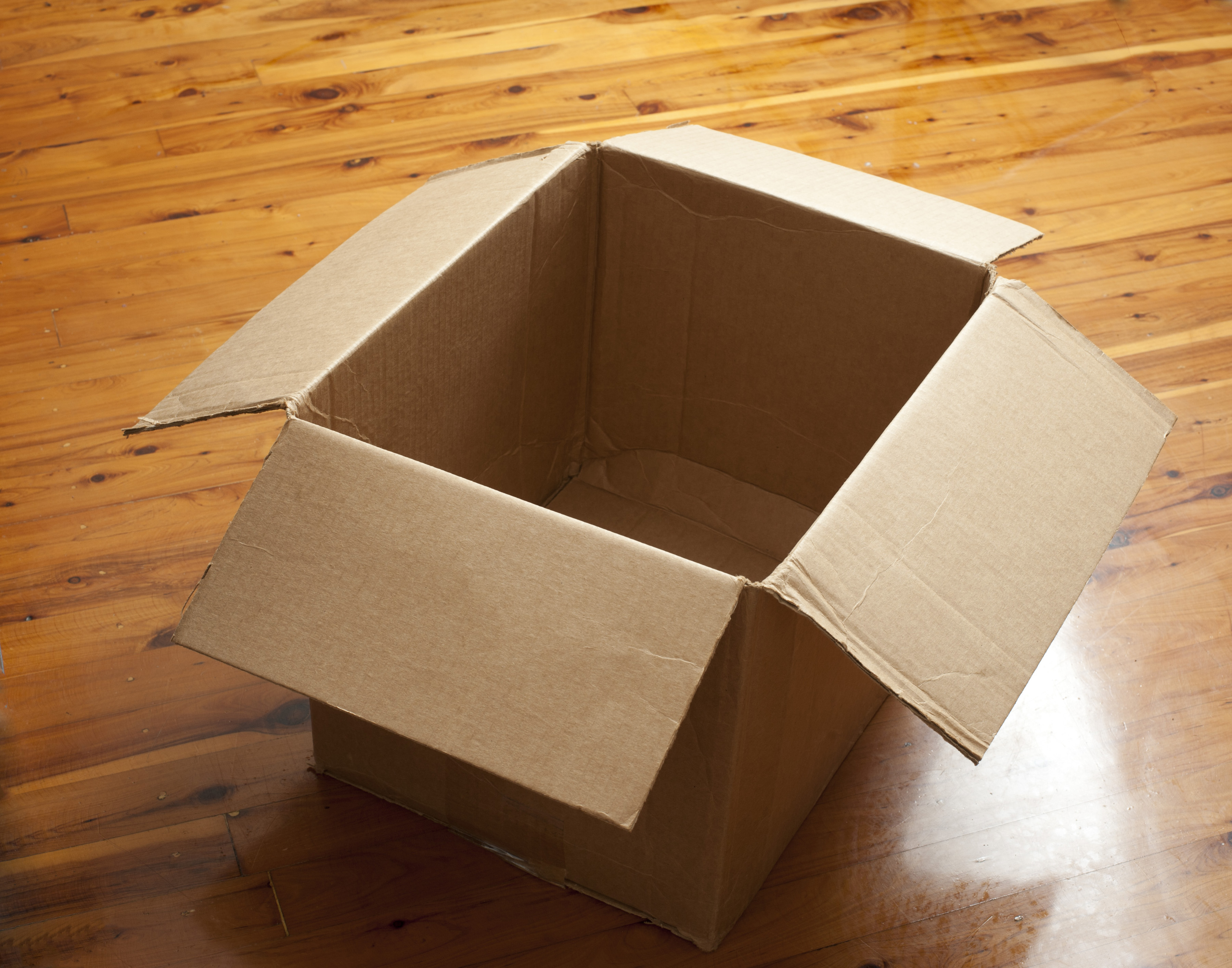
Typical corrugated box (RSC)

Corrugated boxes are commonly used as shipping containers (more than 90% of all shipping containers are of this type). They are made of corrugated fiberboard which is lightweight, recyclable, and strong enough to ship a variety of products.

== Wooden box ==
Wooden boxes are often used for shipping heavy and dense products. They are sometimes specified for shipments of government or military shipments.

== Crate ==
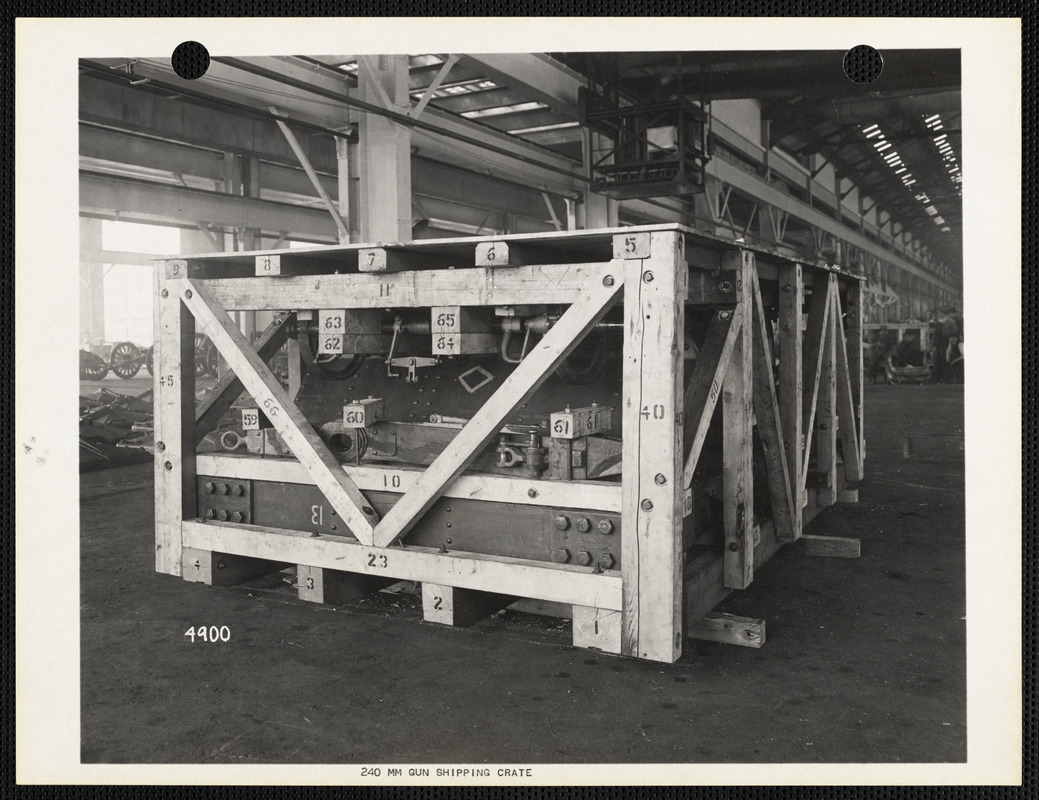
Military shipping crate

A crate is a large container, often made of wood, used to transport large, heavy or awkward items. A crate has a self-supporting structure, with or without sheathing.

Reusable plastic versions include:

- Euro container
- Systainer, for shipping tools.

== Intermediate bulk shipping container ==
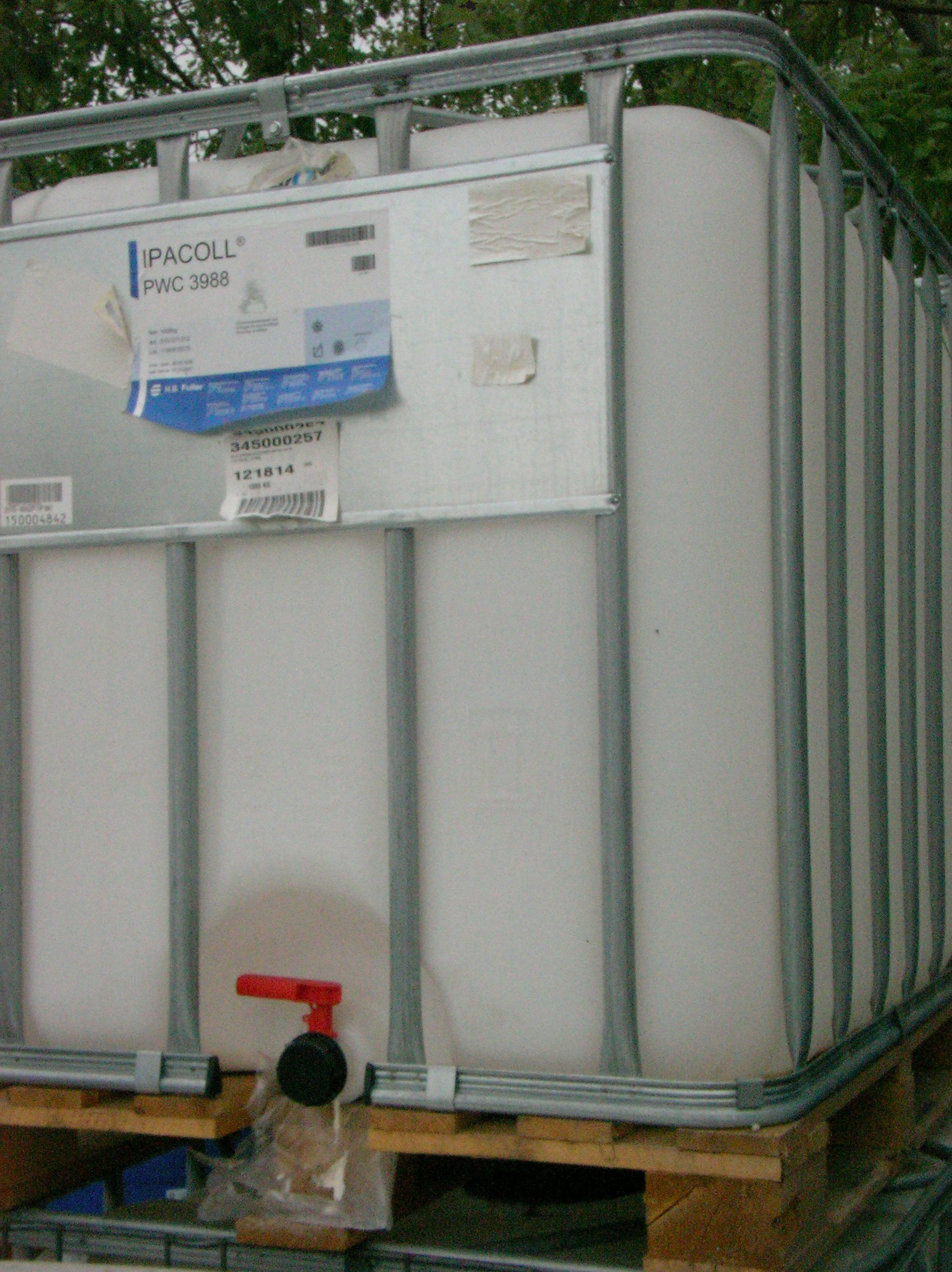
A typical IBC.

An intermediate bulk container (IBC, IBC Tote, IBC Tank) is a multi-use container employed for the general transport, storage, and handling of bulk fluids and materials. IBC tanks are compatible with, and resistant to, an extensive list of chemicals, acids, caustics, as well as inert materials and food grade consumables. IBCs are commonly manufactured from the following materials:

- Plastic (high-density polyethylene)
- Composite: steel and plastic
- Carbon steel
- Stainless steel (304 and 316/316L SS grades)

Some IBC engineering models are foldable (collapsible) for space-saving breakdown following use.

=== Flexible intermediate bulk container ===
A flexible intermediate bulk container, FIBC, big bag, bulk bag, or super sack is a standardized container in large dimensions for storing and transporting granular products. It is often made of a woven synthetic material.

== Bulk box ==
A bulk box, bulk bin, skid box, or tote box is a pallet size box used for storage and shipping of bulk quantities.

== Drum ==
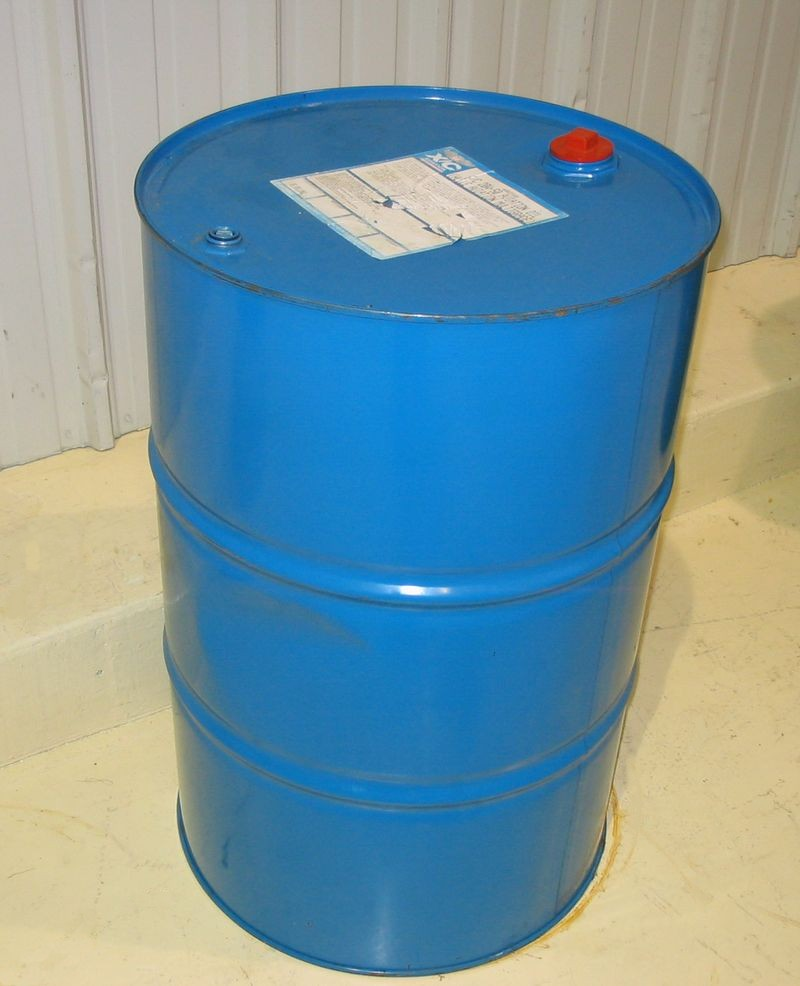
Example of steel drum

Drums are cylindrical shipping containers made of steel, plastic or fiber. They are often used for liquids and granular materials.

== Insulated ==
Insulated shipping containers are a type of packaging used to ship temperature sensitive products such as foods, pharmaceuticals, and chemicals. They are used as part of a cold chain to help maintain product freshness and efficacy.

== Pail ==
Some pails are used as shipping containers.

== Unit load device ==
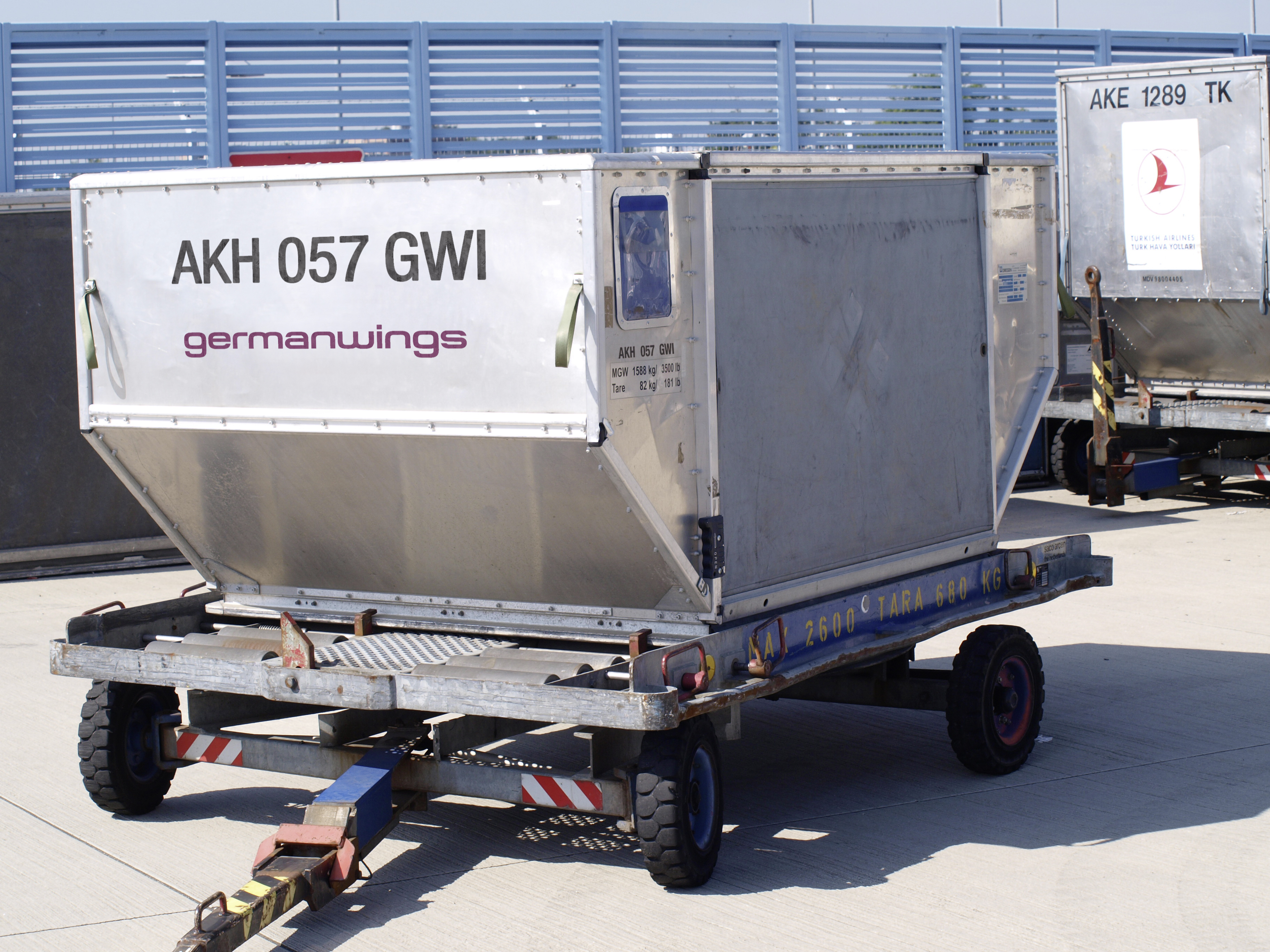
A "LD3-45" unit load device on a trailer

A Unit Load Device (ULD), is a container used to transport cargo on commercial aircraft. It can be a pallet or container used to load luggage, freight, and mail on wide-body aircraft and specific narrow-body aircraft. It allows a large quantity of cargo to be bundled into a single unit. Since this leads to fewer units to load, it saves ground crews time and effort and helps prevent delayed flights. Each ULD has its own packing list, manifest, or tracking identification to improve control and tracking of contents.

== Specialized ==
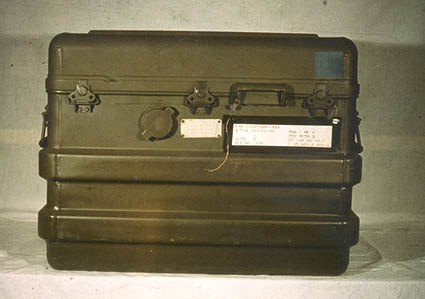
A container for shipping weapons, with carrying handles

Custom containers are used for shipments of products such as scientific instruments, weapons and aviation components. Customized cushioning, blocking and bracing, carrying handles, lift rings, locks, etc. are common to facilitate handling and to protect the contents. Often, these shipping containers are reusable.

The reusable ifco tray ("international fruit container") is used in Europe for transportation of fruit, vegetables, and fish.

=== Transit and flight cases ===
Flight cases and transit cases are usually custom designed for shipping and carrying fragile equipment: audio visual, camera, instruments, etc. Although generally light in construction, they tend to have reinforced edges and corners.

=== Road cases ===
Road cases are often used for shipping musical instruments and theater props.

== Re-use ==
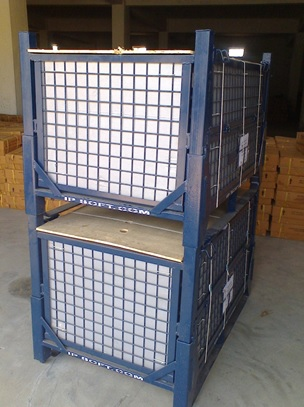
A steel cage or rack commonly used in auto industry

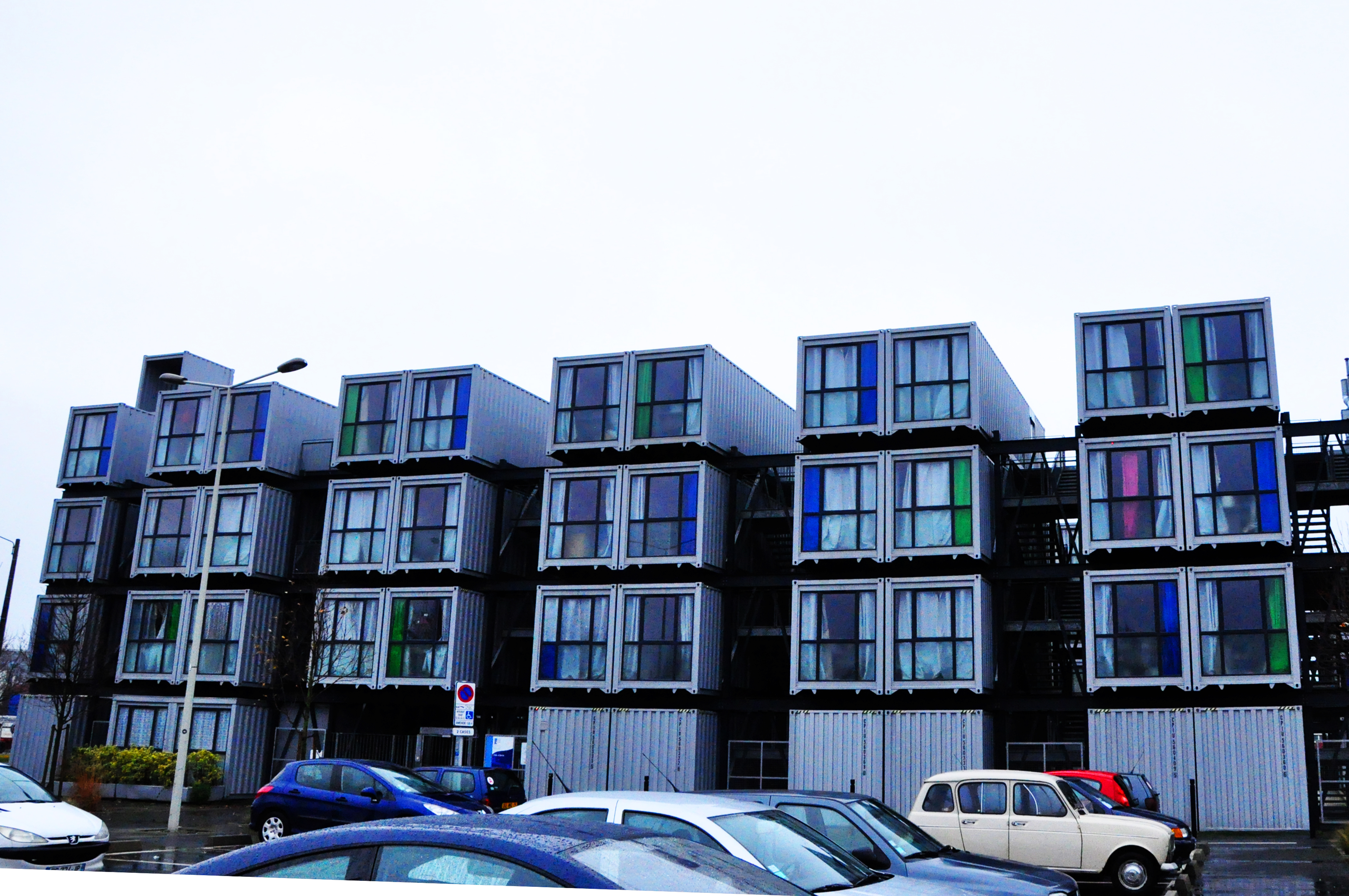
Student apartments built out of shipping containers in Le Havre, France

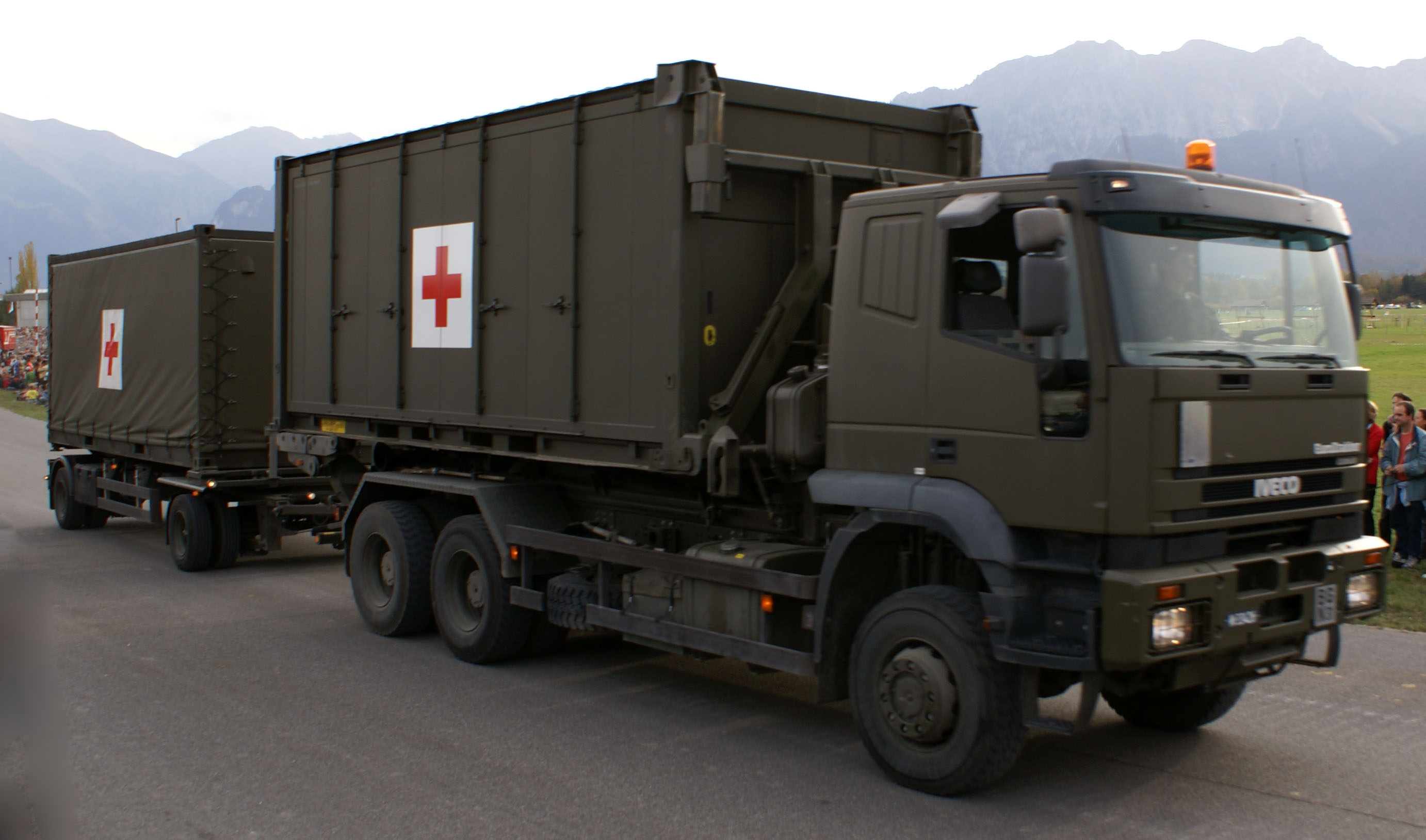
Transport truck of the Swiss Army with field hospital in container.

Many types of shipping containers are reusable. Steel drums are frequently reconditioned and reused. Gas cylinders, transit cases and sometimes even corrugated boxes are reused.

=== Reuse of intermodal steel shipping containers ===
The widespread availability and relative cheapness of used intermodal shipping containers meant that architects began to consider them as an alternative to traditional building materials. Used shipping containers have been converted for use in housing, and as retail and office spaces. Examples of its use include the Cité A Docks student housing project in Le Havre, France; the Wenckehof container village in Amsterdam; the portable Puma City store in US cities; the food and retail Boxpark in London; the Dordoy Bazaar in Bishkek, Kyrgyzstan; the temporary mall Re:START in Christchurch, New Zealand built after the 2011 Christchurch earthquake, and as intensive-care units in temporary hospitals during the COVID-19 pandemic. The Smoky Park Supper Club in Asheville, North Carolina, opened in 2015, was constructed from 19 containers and is considered " "America's largest recycled shipping container restaurant."

It has however been pointed out there are problems with recycling shipping containers, that it may not be as ecologically friendly or cheap an option as it might appear. The containers may be coated with harmful chemicals such as chromate, phosphorus, and lead-based paints, while its wooden floors may be treated with toxic insecticides, and some cost and effort are involved in modifying containers to make them habitable. Others have noted various issues such as space constraint, insulation, and structural weakness if too much steel is cut out of the containers.

Shipping containers are used in the film and television industry for building temporary sets. Shipping containers can be stacked on top of each other and used as reinforced scaffold that large-scale film sets can be built against. An example can be seen at Leavesden Studios, England; an area of the studio backlot is allocated to spare containers when not in use.

=== Reefer container housing units ===
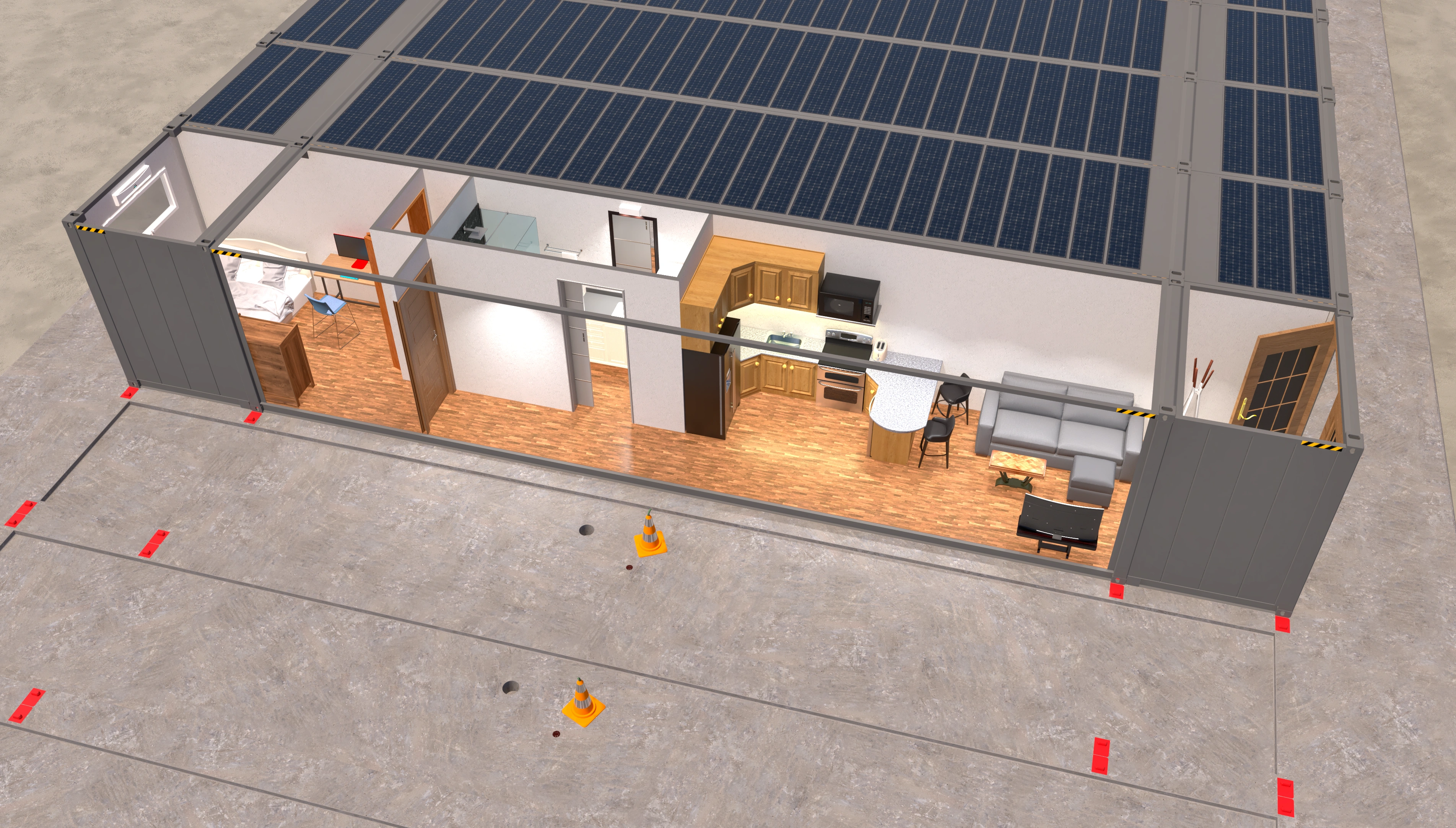
53 foot reefer container home

Reefer containers or refrigerated containers are containers built to haul refrigerated or frozen products. These containers can be repurposed for container housing or prefabricated for housing purposes. The advantage is the insulation in the walls, ceiling, and floor compared to corrugated metal in standard shipping containers that can get very hot or cold from the weather outside. Prefabricated reefer containers with the wiring ran through the walls and the plumbing ran through the ceiling and floor before the insulation, interior walls, and floors are installed would be more practical than trying to do that with a repurposed used reefer container.

== See also ==
- Containerization
- Container garden
- Dumpster
- Dutch flower bucket
- Euro container
- Fumigation
- Intermodal container
- Logistics
- Nuclear flask
- NYC container
- Packaging
- Pallet
- Roll trailer
- Shed
- Sidelifter - Specialized vehicle for shipping containers.
- Skip (container)
