= Alam (disambiguation) =

Alam is a masculine name derived from several ancient languages.

Alam or ALAM may also refer to:

== Places ==
- Alam's House (خانه اعلم), a historical house in Isfahan, Iran
- Alam Bridge, bridge in Pakistan known for Alam Bridge inscriptions

== Organizations ==
- Association of Licensed Automobile Manufacturers, activist organization
- Alam Group, a privately owned conglomerate in Uganda

== Other uses ==
- Alam (finial), a type of Islamic flagpole with finial used in Islamic societies
- Alam (Muharram rituals), a decorated standard used in Shi'a mourning rituals

== See also ==
- Alama, a given name and surname
- Alamabad (disambiguation)
- Alamal (disambiguation) (al-amal "hope" or al-ʿamal "work")
- Alum, chemical compound
