= Badrul Alam (disambiguation) =

Badrul Alam (Arabic: بدر العالم), also rendered as Badr-e Alam (بدر عالم), is a Muslim masculine given name of Arabic origin. It may refer to:

- Badr ul-Alam Syarif Hasyim Jamaluddin (r. 1699–1702), eighteenth sultan of Aceh in Northern Sumatra
- Badr ul-Alam Syah (died 1765), twenty-sixth sultan of Aceh in Northern Sumatra
- Badre Alam Merathi (1898–1965), Pakistani Islamic scholar and poet
- Badrul Alam (1929–1980), Bangladeshi physician
- Badrul Alam (1948–2023), Squadron Leader of Bangladesh Air Force
- Badre Alam (born 1992), Indian cricketer

== See also ==
- Badr (Arabic name)
- Alam
