= Johnny Alam =

Canadian researcher

Johnny Alam is a Canadian researcher, visual artist, and curator. His art and research revolve around questions of memory, technology and representation with a special interest in photography, history and war.

Alam curated the research-exhibition 'Art on a Green Line' at Carleton University Art Gallery between January 19 – April 14, 2015.

== Artwork Series ==
Inspired by one of his professor's collage techniques, Alam developed a theoretical framework to create a series of documentary paintings titled "Timeline Series" in which he transfers photo emulsion and print pigments onto his painted canvases. The series borrows from historical and video editing timeline forms to create mixed media artworks. In another series titled "Ephemeral Commemorations", Alam photographs several roadside commemorative installations by the friends and families of the victims of car accidents. Beyond painting and photography, Alam has experimented with video and film through the Independent Filmmakers Cooperative of Ottawa (IFCO).

== Exhibition reviews ==
Peter Simpson from the Ottawa Citizen wrote: "The Green Line separated two armies, each fighting the other while jockeying for position on their own sides. Nowhere is the line more viscerally rendered than in Alam’s map of Beirut in the 1920s, shortly after the League of Nations’ contentious creation of Lebanon from the vestiges of the Ottoman Empire. On Alam's map the Green Line runs through the city like a surgical scar, the two sides held together by thick thread. Next to the map hangs a blanket given to Alam's family during the war by a humanitarian aid program that was, he writes, co-sponsored by an unidentified king who was "supporting enemy factions on the other side of the Green Line."" In her article for Herd Magazine, Lital Khaiken states: "By assembling objects that relate to alternately personal and public significance, Alam considers the memory of war and the communication of its narrative within diasporic communities. The Green Line is more vaguely referenced in the work of artists from diasporic communities, who are further removed from the specific site of conflict. Alam explains that "the sectarian language that expresses the memory of the Lebanese wars is neither tolerable nor comprehensible within nations such as Canada"." Writing for the L'Hebdo Magazine Beirut, Pauline Mouhanna concludes: "En fait, Alam explique qu’il a essayé de montrer comment «ces œuvres variées nous aident à nous souvenir et, peut-être, commémorer les guerres au Liban». Mais il est tout autant important, selon lui, «d’examiner les façons dont ces œuvres font oublier certains aspects des guerres et des conflits plus récents»."
