= Beirut Knights =

2013 novel by Jasmina Najjar

- First edition cover (publ. Turning Point)
- Author: Jasmina Najjar
- Publisher: Turning Point
- Publication date: December 1, 2013
- ISBN: 978-9-953-02790-6

Beirut Knights is a 2013 novel by Jasmina Najjar. It is a series of humorous short stories about real-life Lebanese dating disasters.

After publishing Beirut Knights, Najjar published a related article in Executive and spoke at TEDxLAU.

== Background ==
Jasmina Najjar explained that there's great pressure to get married in Lebanon. The stories in Beirut Knights are told through the main character, Nadia, who was raised in London, and her friends who from come from different backgrounds and walks of life. This resulted in stories from different perspectives. While written to entertain through its tales of dating disasters, Beirut Knights also touches upon certain elements of Lebanese society and sociocultural issues in a light manner.

== Reception ==
Beirut Knights received mainly positive reviews, including from Al Arabiya News, L'Orient-Le Jour, and l'Hebdo Magazine. It was also mentioned on popular Lebanese blogs, including Blog Baladi and Aishti Blog.
