= Badr Jajarmi =

13th century Persian poet (died 1287)

Badr al-Din ibn Umar Jajarmi (died c. 1287; Persian: بدرالدین ابن عمر جاجرمی), known as Badr Jajarmi, was a prominent Persian poet of the 13th century.

== Biography ==
Badr Jajarmi was born in Jajarm, located in the Khorasan region of Iran. Although the exact date of his birth remains unknown, he spent his youth in Khorasan, where he pursued his education. Later, he traveled to Isfahan with the hope of serving in the court of Baha al-Din Muhammad Juvayni, the ruler of Isfahan (r. 1250–1279). In Isfahan, Badr Jajarmi gained recognition for his poetic talent and received the title Malik al-Shu'ara (ملک الشعراء; lit. King of Poets) for his dedication to praising Baha al-Din. During his time there, he became acquainted with the esteemed poet Majd al-Din Hamgar and benefited from his knowledge and experience. Since Majd al-Din Hamgar was older and more established as a poet, most biographers have considered Badr Jajarmi as Hamgar's pupil.

His son, Muhammad ibn Badr, commonly known as Jajarmi, was also a notable Persian poet and anthologist of the 14th century, originating from Isfahan. Although little is known about Muhammad's life, his only surviving work is the anthology Mo'nes al-Ahrar fi Daqa'iq al-Ash'ar. This anthology compiles poems by nearly two hundred of the greatest poets contemporary to both his father and himself.

Badr Jajarmi passed away in approximately 1287 CE, shortly after the deaths of Majd al-Din Hamgar. It is noteworthy that some biographers have mistakenly conflated Badr Jajarmi's biography with that of another poet named Badr Chachi, likely due to the similarity of their names.

== Works ==
Around four thousand verses of his poetry have survived, mostly consisting of qasidas (odes), ghazals, quatrains, and fragments. His son, Muhammad, compiled these poems in Mo'nes al-Ahrar. The themes of his poetry largely encompass monotheism, praise of the Prophet Muhammad, eulogies, and references to historical events like births and deaths. It appears that Badr Jajarmi was also familiar with medicine and astronomy, as he composed 232 verses about bodily movements, known as ikh tilajat al-a'da (اختلاجات اعضا) and lunar phases, ikhtiyarat al-qamar (اختیارات قمر).

Most of Badr Jajarmi's qasidas were composed in praise of Baha al-Din Muhammad Juvayni, the ruler of Isfahan. He also wrote poetry in honor of Shams al-Din Juvayni, Baha al-Din's father, and Ata-Malik Juvayni, his brother. The content of his poetry suggests that he remained in the service of the Juwayni family until their downfall. After the assassination of Shams al-Din Juvayni by the Mongols in 1284, Badr composed an elegy mourning his death.

=== Poetic style ===
Badr Jajarmi was proficient in Arabic and drew inspiration from Arabic poetic works. One of his known contributions is a Persian translation of an Arabic poem by Abu al-Fath al-Busti.

His poetic style is known for its intricacy and deliberate use of various literary devices, such as interweaving (mutashabik), crossing (mutaqaati'), decorating (tashmit), punning (tajnis), embellishing (tawshih), and repetition (radd al-sadr, radd al-'ajz). He prided himself on mastering this sophisticated approach, considering himself superior to his contemporaries. However, the extensive use of these literary techniques rendered his poetry devoid of delicacy and charm. The style of his qasidas was influenced by the poets of 12th-century Khorasan.
