= Art on a Green Line =

Art on a Green Line was an art exhibition featuring the work of Lebanese artists active during the Lebanese Civil War at Carleton University, Ottawa, Canada between January 19 and April 14, 2015. The exhibition was curated by Johnny Alam.

== Exhibition ==
=== Wall text ===
Between 1975 and 1990, Lebanon was a battleground for local, regional, and international conflicts commonly referred to as the Civil Wars by foreigners and as the "foreign wars on our grounds," or the "Ahdeth" [events], by the Lebanese. Beirut was split by competing ideologies that divided the nation. East Beirut was controlled by the Christian parties claiming to fight for the preservation of the Lebanese nation-state against increasing Palestinian militancy. West Beirut was controlled by a coalition of Palestinian, Leftist, and Muslim parties claiming to fight for the primacy of the Palestinian cause, against a hegemonic Christian regime. A demarcation line separating East and West Beirut came to be known as the Green Line.

While the origin of this designation is not certain, the Green Line aptly described the post-apocalyptic cityscape it traversed, where streets and buildings were overtaken by wild vegetation. Although the boundary has ceased to exist physically, it still remains psychologically present today as a negative site of memory that has at least two levels of meaning. First, it is a symbol of atrocity, a location of ruthless battles, kidnappings, and war crimes. Second, it represents a national identity crisis that continues to divide citizens along ideological lines. It is hard to think of a better location to start writing the unwritten official history of the ongoing Lebanese wars and to document their intergenerational traumas.

...The makers of these works offer vivid experiences of everyday life during wartime, which history books simply cannot convey. The artists' firsthand experience of war at an early age gives their stories a heightened sense of reality. In their works, they blur the lines between truth and fiction, past and present, memory and history, home and exile, and personal and collective trauma. Each work comes to operate as an alternative form of history and memory, transporting knowledge and narratives about the Lebanese wars across borders, places and times.

=== Featured artists ===
- Hassan Choubassi
- Joana Hadjithomas
- Khalil Joreige
- Merdad Hage
- Lamia Joreige
- Jayce Salloum
- Pierre Sidaoui

=== Pieces ===
The exhibition included "photographs, videos, books, postcards, and even a metro map".

== Exhibition reviews ==
Reviews of this exhibition and interviews with the curator appeared in the Ottawa Citizen, Herd Magazine, L'Hebdo Magazine, Study28, and Apartment613 among others.
