= Nurul Alam (disambiguation) =

Nurul Alam (Arabic: نور العالم, lit. 'Light of the world'), also rendered as Noor-e Alam (نور عالم), is a Muslim masculine given name. It may refer to:

== People ==
- Nurul Alam Naqiatuddin Syah (r. 1675–1678), Sultana of Aceh
- ABM Nurul Alam (1929–1971), Bangladeshi physician
- Noor Alam (1929–2003), Pakistani field hockey player
- Nur Alam Ziku (1938–2010), Bangladeshi politician
- Nure Alam Chowdhury (1943–2021), former Chief Justice of Calcutta High Court
- Nur-e-Alam Siddique (1944–2023), founding chairman of Doreen Group, Bangladesh
- Nurul Alam Chowdhury (1945–2019), Bangladeshi diplomat
- Noor Alam Khalil Amini (1952–2021), Indian Islamic scholar, academic and litterateur
- Noor-E-Alam Chowdhury Liton (born 1964), 8th Chief Whip of Bangladeshi parliament
- Noor Alam Saddam (born 1995), Bangladeshi cricketer
- Nurul Alam, Bangladeshi politician
- Noor Alam Khan, Pakistani politician
- Nurul Alam Atique, Bangladeshi television dramatist, scriptwriter and film-maker

== See also ==
- Noor
- Alam
- Nur Qutb Alam (died 1416), Islamic scholar
