= Aftab Alam =

Aftab Alam may refer to:

- Aftab Alam (judge) (born 1948), Indian judge
- Aftab Alam (Afghan cricketer) (born 1992), Afghan cricketer
- Aftab Khan (fielding coach) (born 1984), Former Pakistani cricketer and coach
- Aftab Alam (died 2015), Pakistani journalist
- Mohammad Aftab Alam, Nepali politician
