= Alamgir Karim =

Polymer materials scientist

- Education: St. Stephen's College, Delhi; Northwestern University
- Scientific career
- Workplaces: University of Houston
- Thesis: Neutron reflection studies of interdiffusion in polymers (1990)
- Doctoral advisor: Gian P. Felcher
- Other academic advisors: Matthew Tirrell
- Website: Karim Research Group

Alamgir Karim is a professor of chemical and biomolecular engineering at the University of Houston noted for his work on polymer and polymer nanocomposite materials.

== Education ==
Karim received a B.Sc. degree in physics from St. Stephen's College, Delhi in 1985. He worked under [[]] at Northwestern University, where he received a PhD in physics in 1991. He worked as a postdoctoral research associate under Matthew Tirrell at the University of Minnesota in 1991 -- 1992.

== Career ==
Karim joined the Polymers Division at the National Institute of Standards and Technology in 1993, advancing from Physicist to Group Leader. In 2004 he was named a Fellow of the American Physical Society from the Division of Polymer Physics for pioneering research on polymer thin films and interfaces, polymer brushes, blend film phase separation, thin film dewetting, pattern formation in block copolymer films, and the application of combinatoric measurement methods to complex polymer physics. In 2008 he moved to the Department of Polymer Engineering at the University of Akron, where he was the Goodyear Chair Professor. In 2017 he joined the Department of Chemical & Biomolecular Engineering at the University of Houston (UH), where he is the Dow Chair and Welch Foundation Professor.

Karim is an expert in the processing of polymer thin films, polymer brushes block copolymers, polymer blends, and polymer-nanoparticle mixtures. He has applied these materials to produce membranes, phase gratings, and sensors, among other applications.

At UH, he has developed methods to process chitin, increase the energy density of capacitors and manipulate polyelectrolyte coacervate droplets. In 2024 he proposed that coacervate droplets suspended in deionized water could potentially act as protocells for the origins of life.

His most-cited research article demonstrated a method to calculate the elastic moduli of polymer thin films from the spacing of wrinkles on polymer films.

== Awards and recognition ==
- 2002 — Bronze Medal Award, United States Department of Commerce
- 2004 — Fellow, American Physical Society
- 2012 — Fellow, American Association for the Advancement of Science
- 2021 — National Science Foundation Special Creativity Award
