= Backstage Production =

- Industry: Music, entertainment
- Genre: Various
- Founded: 1999
- Headquarters: Beirut, Lebanon
- Key people: Khodr Alama (CEO)
- Products: Music, entertainment
- Website: www.backstageproduction.me

Backstage Production (or simply Backstage) is a pan-Arab artist management company based in the Middle East and controlled by CEO Khodr Alama.

== History ==
The company was founded in 1999 by Khodr Alama with an initial objective of managing the work of his brother superstar Ragheb Alama's musical and artistic work. The success of the company came with Alama's ability to incorporate international record labels and artists in his events, which further flourished Ragheb's career as a performer. After the success of Ragheb Alama, the company expanded to manage artists such as Maria Nadim, and collaborating with international artists such as DJ Karma, David Vendetta and Shakira.

In 2009, Backstage Production's Ragheb Alama received the Platinum Award from Virgin Megastore Middle East for his album Ba'sha'ak.

In 2010, Backstage Production struck a deal with Starbucks coffee to sell its albums at its coffee shops.

== List of backstage production artists ==
- Ragheb Alama

== See also ==
- Ragheb Alama
