= Jajarmi =

Persian poet and anthologist

Muhammad ibn Badr (Persian: محمد ابن بدر, lit. 'Muhammad son of Badr'), commonly known as Jajarmi, was a 14th-century Persian poet and anthologist from Isfahan, Iran. Little is known about his life, but he was the son of Badr al-Din ibn Umar Jajarmi, and his only surviving work is an anthology of poems titled Moʾnes al-aḥrār fi daqāʾeq al-ašʿār ("The Free Man's Companion to the Niceties of Poems").

== Sources ==
- Beelaert, Anna Livia (2008). "Jājarmi". In Yarshater, Ehsan (ed.). Encyclopædia Iranica. Vol. XIV/4: Jade III–Jamalzadeh, Mohammad-Ali II. Work. London and New York: Routledge & Kegan Paul. pp. 397–398. ISBN 978-1-934283-04-2.
