= The Beautiful Bedouin =

Al-Badawiyah Al-Hasnaa
- Directed by: Ibrahim Lama
- Screenplay by: Badr Lama; Al-Sayed Ziyada
- Starring: Badr Lama; Badria Raafat
- Cinematography: Mahmoud Nasr (indoor scenes); Rishard Salama (outdoor scenes)
- Edited by: Badr Abdullah
- Release date: February 17, 1947
- Running time: 95 minutes
- Country: Egypt
- Language: Arabic

The Beautiful Bedouin (Al-Badawiyah Al-Hasnaa - البدوية الحسناء ) is an Egyptian film released in 1947. It was written by Badr Lama and Al-Sayed Ziyada, directed by Ibrahim Lama, and starred Badr Lama and Badria Raafat.

== Plot ==
Mehoub, a Bedouin youth, spends some time in the city to receive an education. While there, he meets Badriya, who soon disappears. He returns to his tribe and is invited by his friends to attend a celebration in honor of the recovery of the tribe's sheikh, Awf. There he meets Badriya again and discovers that she is engaged to her cousin Diab, which sparks jealousy and animosity between Mehoub and Diab. The two lovers secretly marry at the home of Sheikh Fadel, the tribe's official, but Diab harasses Mehoub and kills him, fleeing the scene. The tribe's horsemen pursue him, while the sheikh falls into a dangerous situation on a desert road. Fate sends Mehoub to the sheikh's rescue at the critical moment. Mehoub manages to save the sheikh, who forgives him and announces his pardon. The hearts, concepts, and emotions change, and the two tribes can declare the young man's marriage to the girl without shame or hatred.

== Cast ==
- Badr Lama
- Badria Raafat
- Alawiyah Jameel
- Mounir Fakhry
- Tharwat Fakhr
- Thuria Fakhry
- Al-Sayed Bedeir
- Mohammed Al-Deeb
- Soad Ahmed
- Abdelsalam Al-Nabulsi

== Crew ==
- Director: Ibrahim Lama
- Screenplay: Badr Lama, Al-Sayed Ziyada
- Cinematography: Mahmoud Nasr (indoor scenes), Rishard Salama (outdoor scenes)
- Editor: Badr Abdullah
