= Alamgir Kumkum =

- আলমগীর কুমকুম
- Born: January 12, 1942; Dhaka, Bangladesh
- Died: 27 February 2012 (aged 70); Apollo Hospitals, Dhaka, Bangladesh
- Resting place: Banani graveyard, Dhaka, Bangladesh
- Occupations: Producer, Director
- Years active: 1968–2010
- Notable work: Amar Jonmovumi, Mayer Doa

Alamgir Kumkum was a Bangladeshi filmmaker, producer and director.

== Career ==
In 1968, Alamgir Kumkum came to the Bengali film industry as an Assistant Director with his uncle ER Khan. His first directed film was "Chena Ochena". Then he also worked as assistant director of the film "Rupabener Rupkataha" and "Madhubala". In 1969, Alamgir Kumkum debuted as a film director. His notable films are Smitituku Thak, Amar Jonmovumi, Gunda, Mayer Doa। His last directed film was Jibon Chabi.।

== Filmography ==
- Smrituku Thak
- Amar Jonmovumi
- Gunda
- Momota
- Aguner Alo
- Kapurush
- Sonar Cheye Dami
- Rajbondi
- Bhalobasha
- Rajar Raja
- Kabin
- Shamsher
- Roki
- Mayer Doa
- Amor Sangi
- Jibon Chabi
