= Ahmad bin Ibrahim Badr =

Saudi Arabian goldsmith

Ahmad bin Ibrahim Badr (Arabic: أحمد بن إبراهيم بدر; 1920– 6 November 2009) is the chief artist who recast the golden door of the Kaaba.

== Biography ==
Badr was born at his ancestral home in the Qashashiya quarter of Makkah in 1920. After studying at the local Falah school he joined his father at his gold and silver workshop at the age of 15.

He had been working at his father's shop in the Goldsmiths' street in Mecca all his life. He belonged to a family of artists known for exquisite gold works. He learned his art from his father Ibrahim Badr who originally designed and built the door when King Abdul Aziz ordered him to in 1942.

Badr died at the age of 89 in the city of Mecca on Friday 6 November 2009. The Grand Mosque held funeral prayers at dawn on the following Saturday.

== Notable Works ==
He made the Kaaba door using 300 kg of gold at the orders of King Khaled bin Abd al-Aziz in October 1979. The work was carried out at a workshop prepared exclusively for the project. The prayer "Ya Hayy Ya Qayyum" (O the Living O the Lasting), verses of the Quran and the words Allah and Muhammad were inscribed on the door. He also refurbished the meezab, the spout at the top of Kaaba, and the Black Stone's silver frame. Badr and his two relatives, Mahmoud and Ibrahim Badr, cast the door in gold, taking a year to complete the work. The interior pillars and the meezab, made with 25 kg of 24-carat gold, were also completed during that time.
