= Ulam (surname) =

Ulam is a surname. Notable people with this surname include:

- Stanisław Ulam (1909–1984), Polish-American mathematician who participated in the Manhattan Project
- Adam Ulam (1922–2000), Polish-American professor of history and political science at Harvard University, brother of Stanislaw Ulam
- Françoise Aron Ulam (1918–2011), wife of Stanislaw Ulam, part of the Manhattan Project team
