= Fouad Salam Alam =

Egyptian volleyball player (born 1951)

Personal information
- Nationality: Egyptian
- Born: 9 October 1951 (age 73)

Sport
- Sport: Volleyball

Fouad Salam Alam (born 9 October 1951) is an Egyptian volleyball player. He competed in the men's tournament at the 1976 Summer Olympics.
