= Olam.uz =

Former Uzbek internet portal

- Founded: 2011; 15 years ago
- Headquarters: Tashkent, Uzbekistan
- Area served: Uzbekistan
- Services: Web portal and online services
- Owner: Mobile Mass Media LLC

Olam.uz was an Uzbek web portal owned by Mobile Mass Media LLC. Established in 2011, it was an independent website in the Russian language. The liberal nature of its comment section (countering its self-censorship, which was common among Uzbek websites of the time) led to it being suspended for seven months in 2013 and was later shut down after its revival. Despite being in Russian, the website gained popularity among local netizens.

== History ==
Olam.uz launched on 1 March 2011. In its initial phase it carried news, e-mail services, a search engine, TV schedules, vacancies and weather details. The website planned to add new features at the short term, such as a social media platform, blogs and a dictionary service. A blog service was added in April. The social network My Olam started later that year; in September, it partnered with Uztelecom for a sweepstakes campaign. In February 2012, its editors started Interactive Power, where readers gave their opinions to several Uzbek ministries. By year-end 2012, readers had received replies from at least eight ministries. On 24 September, it won the Best Mass Media Website category at the National Domain Internet Festival, alongside Gazeta.uz and Kun.uz.

On 19 January 2013, the website was replaced by a message in Russian saying that it was down due to "technical improvements", later, according to Uzbek netizens, its website and social media platforms went offline. While the website's team thought it was due to "technical reasons", independent news website CA-NEWS reported on 28 January that it was due to a criminal case against Olam. The report referred to Olam as supporting a foreign state in hostilities against Uzbekistan, treason, espoionage, sabotage and destruction of files containing state secrets, as well as using news items from the wires of the Uzbek National Information Agency "violating copyright laws". The BBC's Uzbek service visited its Facebook page; some users believed that its suspension was due to winning a prize from Gulnara Karimova's foundation in the previous year. The website reopened in August 2013 with the solving of the problems faced in January, as well as a new interface. The video, job vacancy and music sections were to be readded later. The new version still had comments, but these weren't visible yet; likely because its earlier closure was due to opinions from users.
