= Badr Lama =

Palestinian actor (1907–1947)

- Born: 23 April 1907
- Died: 1 October 1947 (aged 40)
- Occupation: Actor
- Years active: 1928-1947

Badr Lama (Arabic: بدر لاما, born Badro Lamas or Badro el A‘ma, 23 April 1907 - 1 October 1947) was an actor. He appeared in more than twenty films from 1928 to 1947, including the 1941 film Saladin.

== Filmography ==
The filmography of Badr Lama includes a diverse range of movies spanning from 1928 to 1943.

- 1928: A Kiss in the Desert (Qoublah fil-sahrâ’)
- 1928: A Tragedy on the Pyramid (Fâgui‘ah fawq el haram)
- 1930: The Miracle of Love (Mou‘guizat el houbb)
- 1934: The Ghost of the Past (Chabah el mâdî)
- 1935: Maarouf the Bedouin (Ma‘rouf el badawî)
- 1936: The Runaway (el hârib)
- 1937: Just What's Needed (‘Izz el talab)
- 1938: Bewildered Souls (Noufous hâ’irah)
- 1939: The Lost Treasure (el kanz el mafqoud)
- 1939: Qais and Laila (Qays wa Layla)
- 1940: A Man Torn between two Women (Ragoul bayna Imra ’tayn)
- 1940: A Cry in the Night (Sarkhah fî-l-layl)
- 1941: Saladin (Salah Eddine el Ayyoubî)
- 1942: Child of the Desert (Ibn al saharâ’)
- 1943: Cleopatra (Cleôbatra)
- 1943: The Call of Blood (Nidâ’ el dam)
- 1943: Rabha (Râbha)
- 1947: The Beautiful Bedouin
