= Shafiq Badr =

Lebanese politician

Shafiq Badr (died June 27, 2013) was a Lebanese politician. He was MP for Chouf (1972–1992).
