= Habibul Ahsan =

Bangladeshi epidemiologist

- Born: Bangladesh
- Education: University of Dhaka; University of Western Australia
- Known for: Health Effects of Arsenic Longitudinal Study
- Scientific career
- Fields: Epidemiology
- Workplaces: University of Chicago; Columbia University

Habibul Ahsan is a Bangladeshi epidemiologist. He is the Louis Block Distinguished Service Professor at the University of Chicago, where he serves as Dean for Population and Precision Health and directs the Institute for Population and Precision Health. His research focuses on the health effects of arsenic exposure from drinking water — particularly through the Health Effects of Arsenic Longitudinal Study, a large cohort study in Bangladesh — and on the genetic epidemiology of cancer and other diseases.

== Biography ==
Habibul Ahsan was born in Bangladesh. After earning his Bachelor of Medicine, Bachelor of Surgery at the University of Dhaka in 1989, Ahsan completed a master's in medical science at the University of Western Australia in 1992.

He conducted postdoctoral research in molecular epidemiology at Columbia University from 1993 to 1995. He was an associate professor of epidemiology at Columbia University's Mailman School of Public Health before moving to the University of Chicago in 2006.

In 2018, the University of Chicago appointed Ahsan to the Louis Block Distinguished Service Professorship within the Department of Public Health Sciences. He serves as the Dean for Population and Precision Health and director of the university's Institute for Population and Precision Health.

== Research ==
Naturally occurring arsenic in the groundwater of Bangladesh, affecting an estimated 35 to 77 million people, has been described in the Bulletin of the World Health Organization as the largest mass poisoning of a population in history. Ahsan was a principal investigator of the Health Effects of Arsenic Longitudinal Study (HEALS), a prospective cohort study in Araihazar, Bangladesh. A 2004 study of children in Araihazar, co-authored by Ahsan, reported that higher arsenic concentrations in drinking water were associated with reduced intellectual function.

A 2010 analysis from the cohort, published in The Lancet with Ahsan as senior author, found that chronic arsenic exposure through drinking water was associated with increased all-cause and chronic-disease mortality. The study, which linked roughly one in five deaths in the exposed population to arsenic, received international news coverage. A 2013 study using the HEALS cohort, with Ahsan as senior author, found that higher consumption of rice was associated with greater arsenic exposure and a higher prevalence of arsenical skin lesions, suggesting that rice can be a source of arsenic beyond drinking water.

Ahsan has also worked on the genetic epidemiology of cancer and other complex diseases. He was the first author of a 2014 genome-wide association study of early-onset breast cancer that identified PFKM as a novel breast cancer gene. As a participant in large international research consortia, he was among the authors of a 2017 study in Nature that analysed more than 120,000 breast cancer cases and identified 65 new risk loci, a 2018 meta-analysis in Nature Communications identifying risk variants for type 2 diabetes, and the eQTLGen Consortium's 2021 analysis in Nature Genetics of genetic effects on blood gene expression.

In addition to his work in Bangladesh, Ahsan leads the ChicagO Multiethnic Prevention and Surveillance Study (COMPASS), a University of Chicago cohort begun in 2013 that examines how lifestyle, environmental, and genetic factors contribute to disparities in cancer and chronic disease.
