= Polymer nanocomposite =

Polymer nanocomposites (PNC) are composite materials consisting of inorganic nanoparticles dispersed within a polymer matrix. They offer enhanced material properties such as increased stiffness, thermal stability, increased fire barrier resistance and more. The classification of PNCs depends on the dimension of the nanoparticle, type of polymer, morphology of the nanoparticle-polymer matrix and other factors. PNCs are commonly prepared via in-situ polymerization, melt extrusion, solution dispersion. Other classifications of PNCs exist such as carbon-based, metal-based and ceramic-based nanoparticles. Depending on the preparation method, PNCs can be prepared following a bottom-up or top-down approach. The bottom-down approach involves creating the nanoparticle inside the polymer matrix or monomer solution. The top-down approach involves producing the nanoparticles first and then mixing them in the polymer matrix.

Nanoparticles or nanostructures are better suited for polymer composites compared to macro- or micro-particles due to the greater interaction between the nanoparticles and the polymer matrix. With this greater interaction, PNCs offer enhanced properties of polymers by improving thermal, mechanical, barrier and optical properties.

Although there are many advantages to PNCs, synthesis of PNCs can be challenging. Common challenges include achieving uniform dispersion of nanoparticles within polymer matrix, strong interfacial bonding to prevent accumulation of the nanoparticles within the polymer matrix and controlling the orientation of the nanoparticles within the polymer matrix.

PNCs are used in various fields such as biomedical, pharmaceutical, engineering and more. Silver-embedded PNCs are used to for antibacterial activity. The biocompatible composite MXene, poly (2-(dimethylamino) ethyl methacrylate) (P(2(DMA)EMA), can be used in oral insulin drug delivery. PNCs with conductive nanoparticles such as carbon nanotubes can be used for glucose biosensors.

== Synthesis of Polymer Nanocomposites ==
=== Sol-gel synthesis of polymer nanocomposites ===
The sol-gel process involves the conversion of precursors to particles using hydrolysis and condensation. For PNCs, the nanoparticles are dispersed into a monomer solution and results in a network of polymer and nanoparticles interactions. Therefore, the polymer contributes to the nucleation and growth of the nanoparticles through the monomer solution. It has advantages with uniform nanoparticle distribution, control over particle size, can be done under low temperatures and can control porosity.

=== In-situ polymerization of polymer nanocomposites ===
For in-situ polymerization of PNCs, the nanoparticles are dispersed within a monomer solution and polymerization starts with heat, UV-light exposure, initiator diffusion and/or by use of a catalyst. Therefore, the monomers polymerize with the nanoparticles in the mixture. This can form intercalated or exfoliated nanocomposites. Where intercalated nanocomposites means the polymer chains insert themselves within the layers of nanoparticles creating relatively thick layers of 20–80 Å. Exfoliated nanocomposites, however, form nanometer-scaled layers between the nanoparticles. This method has advantages of high dispersion of the nanoparticles, strong interfacial interaction (between the nanoparticles and the polymer) and versatile.

=== Electro-spinning of polymer nanocomposites ===
In electro-spinning the formation of fibers is done by passing a polymer solution through a high-voltage syringe with a counter electrode (commonly an aluminum sheet) is placed underneath generating an electric field. By dispersing the nanoparticles within the polymer solution, the formation of PNCs is possible. This method has the advantages of control over the diameter of the fibers, of the morphology and of the composition.

== Bio-hybrid polymer nanofibers ==
Many technical applications of biological objects like proteins, viruses or bacteria such as chromatography, optical information technology, sensorics, catalysis and drug delivery require their immobilization. Carbon nanotubes, gold particles and synthetic polymers are used for this purpose. This immobilization has been achieved predominantly by adsorption or by chemical binding and to a lesser extent by incorporating these objects as guests in host matrices. In the guest host systems, an ideal method for the immobilization of biological objects and their integration into hierarchical architectures should be structured on a nanoscale to facilitate the interactions of biological nano-objects with their environment. Due to the large number of natural or synthetic polymers available and the advanced techniques developed to process such systems to nanofibres, rods, tubes etc. make polymers a good platform for the immobilization of biological objects.

=== Bio-hybrid nanofibres by electrospinning ===
Polymer fibers are, in general, produced on a technical scale by extrusion, i.e., a polymer melt or a polymer solution is pumped through cylindrical dies and spun/drawn by a take-up device. The resulting fibers have diameters typically on the 10-μm scale or above. To come down in diameter into the range of several hundreds of nanometers or even down to a few nanometers, Electrospinning is today still the leading polymer processing technique available. A strong electric field of the order of 103 V/cm is applied to the polymer solution droplets emerging from a cylindrical die. The electric charges, which are accumulated on the surface of the droplet, cause droplet deformation along the field direction, even though the surface tension counteracts droplet evolution. In supercritical electric fields, the field strength overbears the surface tension and a fluid jet emanates from the droplet tip. The jet is accelerated towards the counter electrode. During this transport phase, the jet is subjected to strong electrically driven circular bending motions that cause a strong elongation and thinning of the jet, a solvent evaporation until, finally, the solid nanofibre is deposited on the counter electrode.

=== Bio-hybrid polymer nanotubes by wetting ===
Electro spinning, co-electrospinning, and the template methods based on nanofibres yield nano-objects which are, in principle, infinitively long. For a broad range of applications including catalysis, tissue engineering, and surface modification of implants this infinite length is an advantage. But in some applications like inhalation therapy or systemic drug delivery, a well-defined length is required. The template method to be described in the following has the advantage such that it allows the preparation of nanotubes and nanorods with very high precision. The method is based on the use of well defined porous templates, such as porous aluminum or silicon.

The basic concept of this method is to exploit wetting processes. A polymer melt or solution is brought into contact with the pores located in materials characterized by high energy surfaces such as aluminum or silicon. Wetting sets in and covers the walls of the pores with a thin film with a thickness of the order of a few tens of nanometers.

Gravity does not play a role, as it is obvious from the fact that wetting takes place independent of the orientation of the pores relative to the direction of gravity. The exact process is still not understood theoretically in detail but its known from experiments that low molar mass systems tend to fill the pores completely, whereas polymers of sufficient chain length just cover the walls. This process happens typically within a minute for temperatures about 50 K above the melting temperature or glass transition temperature, even for highly viscous polymers, such as, for instance, polytetrafluoroethylene, and this holds even for pores with an aspect ratio as large as 10,000. The complete filling, on the other hand, takes days. To obtain nanotubes, the polymer/template system is cooled down to room temperature or the solvent is evaporated, yielding pores covered with solid layers. The resulting tubes can be removed by mechanical forces for tubes up to 10 μm in length, i.e., by just drawing them out from the pores or by selectively dissolving the template. The diameter of the nanotubes, the distribution of the diameter, the homogeneity along the tubes, and the lengths can be controlled.

=== Applications ===
The nanofibres, nanocomposites, hollow nanofibres, core–shell nanofibres, and nanorods or nanotubes produced potentially have a broad range of applications including homogeneous and heterogeneous catalysis, dental restorative materials, sensorics, filter applications, and optoelectronics. Here we will consider a limited set of applications related to life science.

==== Tissue engineering ====
This is mainly concerned with the replacement of tissues which have been destroyed by sickness or accidents or other artificial means. The examples are skin, bone, cartilage, blood vessels and may be even organs. This technique involves providing a scaffold on which cells are added and the scaffold should provide favorable conditions for the growth of the same. Nanofibres have been found to provide very good conditions for the growth of such cells, one of the reasons being that fibrillar structures can be found on many tissues which allow the cells to attach strongly to the fibers and grow along them as shown.

Nanoparticles such as graphene, carbon nanotubes, molybdenum disulfide and tungsten disulfide are being used as reinforcing agents to fabricate mechanically strong biodegradable polymeric nanocomposites for bone tissue engineering applications. The addition of these nanoparticles in the polymer matrix at low concentrations (~0.2 weight %) leads to significant improvements in the compressive and flexural mechanical properties of polymeric nanocomposites. Potentially, these nanocomposites may be used to create novel, mechanically strong, light weight composite bone implants. The results suggest that mechanical reinforcement is dependent on the nanostructure morphology, defects, dispersion of nanomaterials in the polymer matrix, and the cross-linking density of the polymer. In general, two-dimensional nanostructures can reinforce the polymer better than one-dimensional nanostructures, and inorganic nanomaterials are better reinforcing agents than carbon based nanomaterials.

==== Delivery from compartmented nanotubes ====
Nano tubes are also used for carrying drugs in general therapy and in tumor therapy in particular. The role of them is to protect the drugs from destruction in blood stream, to control the delivery with a well-defined release kinetics, and in ideal cases, to provide vector-targeting properties or release mechanism by external or internal stimuli.

Rod or tube-like, rather than nearly spherical, nanocarriers may offer additional advantages in terms of drug delivery systems. Such drug carrier particles possess additional choice of the axial ratio, the curvature, and the "all-sweeping" hydrodynamic-related rotation, and they can be modified chemically at the inner surface, the outer surface, and at the end planes in a very selective way. Nanotubes prepared with a responsive polymer attached to the tube opening allow the control of access to and release from the tube. Furthermore, nanotubes can also be prepared showing a gradient in its chemical composition along the length of the tube.

Compartmented drug release systems were prepared based on nanotubes or nanofibres. Nanotubes and nanofibres, for instance, which contained fluorescent albumin with dog-fluorescein isothiocyanate were prepared as a model drug, as well as super paramagnetic nanoparticles composed of iron oxide or nickel ferrite. The presence of the magnetic nanoparticles allowed, first of all, the guiding of the nanotubes to specific locations in the body by external magnetic fields. Super paramagnetic particles are known to display strong interactions with external magnetic fields leading to large saturation magnetizations. In addition, by using periodically varying magnetic fields, the nanoparticles were heated up to provide, thus, a trigger for drug release. The presence of the model drug was established by fluorescence spectroscopy and the same holds for the analysis of the model drug released from the nanotubes.

==== Immobilization of proteins ====
Core shell fibers of nano particles with fluid cores and solid shells can be used to entrap biological objects such as proteins, viruses or bacteria in conditions which do not affect their functions. This effect can be used among others for biosensor applications. For example, Green Fluorescent Protein is immobilized in nanostructured fibres providing large surface areas and short distances for the analyte to approach the sensor protein.

With respect to using such fibers for sensor applications fluorescence of the core shell fibers was found to decay rapidly as the fibers were immersed into a solution containing urea: urea permeates through the wall into the core where it causes denaturation of the GFP. This simple experiment reveals that core–shell fibers are promising objects for preparing biosensors based on biological objects.

Polymer nanostructured fibres, core–shell fibres, hollow fibres, nanorods and nanotubes provide a platform for a wide range of applications in both materials science and life science. Biological objects of varying complexity, as well as synthetic objects with specific functions, can be incorporated into such nanostructured polymer systems while retaining their functional properties. Potential applications include biosensors, tissue engineering, drug delivery and enzymatic catalysis. The incorporation of viruses, bacteria and microorganisms into such biohybrid systems represents a further area of ongoing research.

== Engineering applications ==
=== Polymer nanocomposites for automotive tire industry ===
Polymer nanocomposites are important for the automotive tire industry due to the possibility of achieving a higher fuel efficiency by designing polymer nanocomposites with suitable properties.

The most common type of filler particles utilized by the tire industry had traditionally been Carbon black (Cb), produced from the incomplete combustion of coal tar and ethylene. The main reason is that the addition of Cb to rubbers enables the manufacturing of tires of a smaller rolling resistance which accounts for about 4% of the worldwide CO_{2} emissions from fossil fuels. A decrease in the rolling resistance of the car tires produced worldwide is anticipated to decrease the overall fuel consumption of cars due to the fact that a vehicle with tires of a smaller rolling resistance requires less energy to thrust forward. However, a smaller rolling resistance also leads to a lower wet grip performance, which poses concerns of the passenger's safety.

The problem can be partially solved by replacing Cb with silica, because it enables the production of "green" tires that display both improved wet grip properties as well as a smaller rolling resistance.

The main difference in the relevant properties of Cb and silica is that Cb is hydrophobic (as are the polymers used in the manufacturing of car ties) whereas silica is hydrophilic. So in order to increase the compatibility among the silica fillers and the polymer matrix, the silica is usually functionalized with coupling agents, which gives the possibility of tuning the filler-polymer interactions and thus producing nanocomposites of specific properties.

Overall, the main unresolved issue on the mechanical properties of filled rubbers is the elucidation of the exact mechanism of their mechanical reinforcement and of the so-called Payne effect; and owing to a lack of suitable theoretical and experimental approaches, both of them are still poorly understood.

== Size and pressure effects on nanopolymers ==
The size- and pressure- dependent glass transition temperatures of free-standing films or supported films having weak interactions with substrates decreases with decreasing of pressure and size. However, the glass transition temperature of supported films having strong interaction with substrates increases of pressure and the decrease of size. Different models like two layer model, three layer model, T_{g} (D, 0) ∝ 1/D and some more models relating specific heat, density and thermal expansion are used to obtain the experimental results on nanopolymers and even some observations like freezing of films due to memory effects in the visco-elastic eigenmodels of the films, and finite effects of the small molecule glass are observed. To describe T_{g} (D, 0) function of polymers more generally, a simple and unified model recently is provided based on the size-dependent melting temperature of crystals and Lindemann's criterion

T_{g} (D, 0) / T_{g} (∞, 0) ∝ σ_{g}^{2} (∞, 0) / σ_{g}^{2} (D, 0)

where σ_{g} is the root of mean squared displacement of surface and interior molecules of glasses at T_{g} (D, 0), α = σ_{s}^{2} (D, 0) / σ_{v}^{2} (D, 0) with subscripts s and v denoting surface and volume, respectively. For a nanoparticle, D has a usual meaning of diameter, for a nanowire, D is taken as its diameter, and for a thin film, D denotes its thickness. D_{0} denotes a critical diameter at which all molecules of a low-dimensional glass are located on its surface.

== Conclusion ==
Devices that use the properties of low-dimensional objects, such as nanoparticles, are promising due to the possibility of tailoring a number of mechanical, electrophysical, optical and magnetic properties granting some degree of control over the size of nanoparticles during synthesis. In the case of polymer nanocomposites we can use the properties of disordered systems.

Here recent developments in the field of polymer nano-composites and some of their applications have been reviewed. Though there is much use in this field, there are many limitations also. For example, in the release of drugs using nanofibres, cannot be controlled independently and a burst release is usually the case, whereas a more linear release is required. Let us now consider future aspects in this field.

There is a possibility of building ordered arrays of nanoparticles in the polymer matrix. A number of possibilities also exist to manufacture the nanocomposite circuit boards. An even more attractive method exists to use polymer nanocomposites for neural networks applications. Another promising area of development is optoelectronics and optical computing. The single domain nature and super paramagnetic behavior of nanoparticles containing ferromagnetic metals could be possibly used for magneto-optical storage media manufacturing.

== See also ==
- Nanocomposite
- Biopolymer
- Copolymer
- Electroactive polymers
- Nanocarbon tubes
