= Alamgir, Kapurthala =

Alamgir
- Village
- Location in Punjab, India Alamgir (India)
- Coordinates: 31.2569°N 75.4432°E
- Country: India
- State: Punjab
- District: Kapurthala

Government
  - Type: Panchayati raj (India)
  - Body: Gram panchayat

Languages
  - Official: Punjabi
  - Other spoken: Hindi
- Time zone: UTC+5:30 (IST)
- Telephone code: 01822
- ISO 3166 code: IN-PB
- Vehicle registration: PB-09
- Website: https://kalasanghian.com/

Alamgir is a village located in Kapurthala district, Punjab.

== Demography ==
As per Population Census 2011, the Alamgir village has population of 4952 of which 2583 are males while 2369 are females. The village is administrated by Sarpanch an elected representative of the village. The population of children under the age of 6 years is 469 which is 9.47% of total population of Alamgir, and child sex ratio is approximately 818 lower than state average of 846.

== Population data ==
Particulars	Total	Male	Female
Total No. of Houses	1,030	-	-
Population	4,952	2,583	2,369
Child (0–6)	469	258	211
Schedule Caste	1,712	907	805
Schedule Tribe	0	0	0
Literacy	81.11 %	85.16 %	76.74 %
Total Workers	1,677	1,434	243
Main Worker	1,587	0	0
Marginal Worker	90	51	39
