= Alamgir Kabir =

Alamgir Kabir (Bengali: আলমগরী কবীর) is a Bengali masculine given name and may refer to:

- Alamgir Kabir (film maker) (1938–1989), Bangladeshi film director
- Alamgir Kabir (cricketer) (born 1981), Bangladeshi test cricketer
- Alamgir M. A. Kabir (1911–1996), Bangladeshi police officer and recipient of the Independence Award
- Alamgir Kabir (politician) (born 1948), Bangladesh Nationalist Party politician
- Sheikh Alamgir Kabir Rana (born 1990), Bangladeshi footballer
