= Alamgir Welfare Trust =

Social welfare organization in Pakistan

Alamgir Welfare Trust International
- عالمگیرویلفیرٹرسٹ
- Founded: 1993
- Founder: Shaheed Anwer Naseem Chandna
- Location: Karachi, Sindh, Pakistan
- Key people: Chaudary Nisar Ahmed, Chairman AWT
- Website: http://alamgirwelfaretrust.com.pk

Alamgir Welfare Trust (Urdu: عالمگیر ٹرسٹ) is a social welfare organization and charity in Karachi, Pakistan which provides services in a wide variety of domains including health, education and feeding the underprivileged, etc. It was established in 1993 and is headquartered at Bahadurabad, Karachi.

AWT was founded by Shaheed Anwar Naseem Chandna, who was murdered in 2001. It is presently headed by Chaudary Nisar Ahmed. It first started its services by collecting left-over food from local marriage halls and distributing it amongst over 500 needy people every day. With an annual expenditure of more than 1 billion Rupees, AWT distributes about 45,000 kg. of meat each month from its Sadaqah/Aqeeqa Bakras service in jails, hospitals, madaris, poor students, orphanages, and poor population. More than 5000 packets of food are provided to jails, religious seminaries, hospitals as well as traffic police personnel and others during the month of Ramadan.

AWT also has its own health care centre, Alamgir Health Care Centre. All patients are treated free of cost from Zakat fund. Leading private hospitals are on their panel. Patients needing hospitalization, investigation or surgery are referred to these hospitals where they get complete medical health free of cost. Almost 500 patients are treated and provided free medicines daily in the outpatient department of the Alamgir Health Care Centre. Ambulance services are also provided for transfers of patients.

Many notable personalities have visited Alamgir's Office in Karachi including Consul-General of Japan Mr. Toshikazu Isomura and the key bearer of Kaaba, Al Sheikh Abdul Qadir Al Shaibi.
