= Majd al-Din Hamgar =

Persian Poet and Courtier of 13th century

Majd al-Din Hamgar (Persian: مجد الدین همگر; 1210 – 1287), also known as Majd-i Hamgar (مجد همگر), was a Persian poet and courtier of the 13th-century. While most likely born in Yazd, he is regularly referred to as "Shirazi", and often referred to himself as "Majd-i Parsi", which connects him to the southwestern Iranian region of Pars (Fars).

== Sources ==
- Allegranzi, Viola (2021). "Majd al-Dīn Hamgar". In Fleet, Kate; Krämer, Gudrun; Matringe, Denis; Nawas, John; Rowson, Everett (eds.). Encyclopaedia of Islam (3rd ed.). Brill Online. ISSN 1873-9830.
- Safa, Zabihollah (2003). "Hamgar, Majd-al-Din". In Yarshater, Ehsan (ed.). Encyclopædia Iranica. Vol. XI/6: Ḥājj Sayyāḥ–Harem I. London and New York: Routledge & Kegan Paul. p. 538. ISBN 978-0-933273-70-2.
