= Khodr Alama =

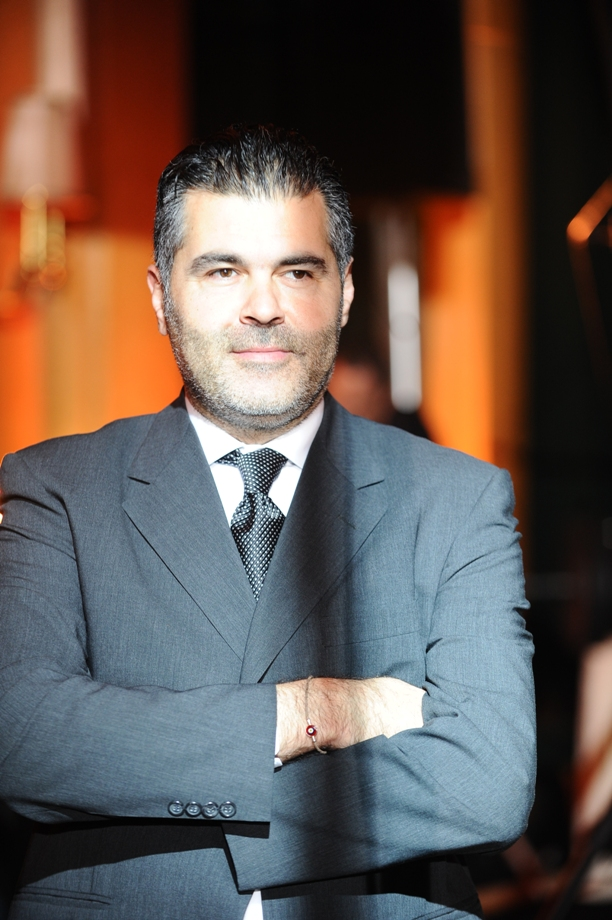
- Alama in 2007

Background information
- Born: December 3, 1963 (age 61)
- Occupation(s): Founder and chief executive officer, Backstage Production
- Years active: 1980s-present
- Labels: Backstage Production (1999–present)

Khodr Alama, sometimes written as Khodr Alameh or Khodr Alame (Arabic: خضر علامة; born December 3, 1963), is a Lebanese music executive and entrepreneur. He is the founder and current CEO of Backstage Production. He is the brother and manager of Lebanese singer Ragheb Alama.

== Life and career ==
Alama is a graduated from the York University with a major in business. He then began a career in the music industry as a guitarist and manager for his brother Ragheb Alama, who won the Platinum Medal on the Lebanese TV show Studio El Fan in 1980.

Alama was the first to bring music videos to the Middle East with Ragheb Alama's song "Albi A'she'aha," After disputes with record labels at the time of releasing Ragheb's album "Al Hob El Kebeer," Alama established his own artist management and entertainment company, Backstage Production, to manage the works of his brother.

=== Backstage Production ===
Alama founded Backstage Production in 1999 and secured deals with Samsung, Mercedes-Benz, Persol, the Malaysian Ministry of Tourism, and the Lou Loua Project in Qatar. Ragheb achieved a Platinum Certification from Virgin Megastores in Dubai for the album "Ba'sha'ak." Ragheb also featured a song with Colombian singer Shakira, featured on the Backstage-produced album "Starz Vol. 1" sold at Starbucks Coffee shops. Alama also signed international artists such as DJ Karma.
