= Leon Alam =

German politician (born 1996)

Member of the Hamburg Parliament
- Incumbent
- Assumed office 26 March 2025

Personal details
- Born: 1996 (age 29–30) Hamburg
- Party: Alliance 90/The Greens (since 2002)

Leon Alam (born 1996 in Hamburg) is a German politician serving as a member of the Hamburg Parliament since 2025. He has served as co-chairman of Alliance 90/The Greens Hamburg since 2023.
