= Alama =

Alama is both a surname and a given name. Notable people with the name include:

== Surname ==
- Ikaika Alama-Francis (born 1984), American football player
- Khodr Alama (born 1963), Lebanese businessman and music executive
- Ragheb Alama (born 1962), Lebanese singer, composer, television personality and philanthropist

== Given name ==
- Alama Ieremia (born 1970), New Zealand rugby union player and coach
