= Alamgir Tower Lahore =

Coordinates: 31.5145°N 74.3436°E

Alamgir Tower
- Interactive map of the Alamgir Tower area

General information
- Status: On hold
- Type: Mixed use
- Location: Lahore, Pakistan

Height
- Roof: over 137 m (449 ft)

Technical details
- Floor count: 31
- Floor area: Unknown
- Lifts/elevators: 12

Design and construction
- Architect: Alamgir Developers

The Alamgir Tower was a proposed high rise building in Lahore, Pakistan.

Alamgir Tower had applied for approval of digging 80 feet deep below ground level but the application was not approved. As of August 2011 Alamgir Tower had until on August 20 they paid the fine. Construction started again and would have been completed by end of 2017.

As of 2026, Alamgir Tower has not been completed and work has not been done since a decade. It is assumed the project was abandoned.
