= The Free Man's Companion to the Niceties of Poems =

1341 anthology of poems by Jājarmi

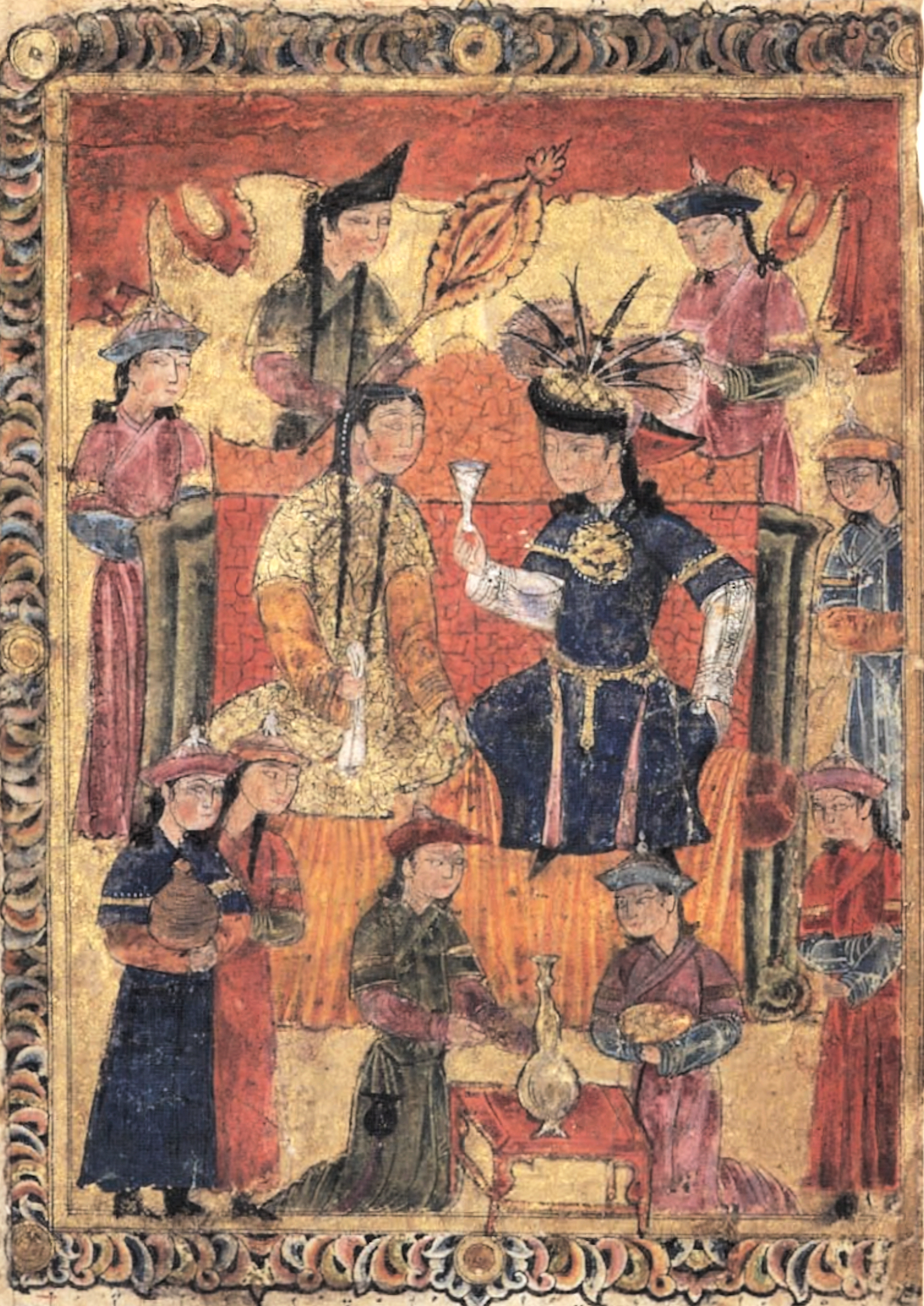
Mu'nis al-ahrar, left frontispiece, 1341. The clothing is Mongol, and the style corresponds to the Mongol Ilkhanid court of Iran.

The Free Man's Companion to the Niceties of Poems (Persian: Mu'nis al-ahrar fi daqa'iq al-ash'ar, often shortened to Mu'nis al-ahrar) is an anthology of poems written in 1340/41 by the Persian poet and anthologist from Isfahan, Jajarmi. The 1341 manuscript was probably made in Isfahan.

There is a lot of uncertainty about the identity of the enthroned couple in the frontispiece, knowing that the manuscript was completed in Isfahan in 1341, and a frontispiece typically represent the sponsor or the ruling authority commissioning the work. Most agree that this is "a Mongol royal couple". Around 1341, Isfahan was indeed controlled by the Mongol Chūbanid Shaykh Hasan, whose nominal Ilkhanid Suleiman Khan had suzerainty over the region. Others have suggested that this could be a contemporary depiction of the Ilkhanid empress Sati Beg (enthroned, left), with her husband Arpa Ke'un or her son. For other authors, this could be Abu Ishaq Inju, promoted Governor of Isfahan by the Mongol Chūbanid Shaykh Hasan in 1341, also based on stylistic similarities with the frontispiece of another manuscript probably commissioned by Abu Ishaq, the Shiraz Shahnama of 1352.

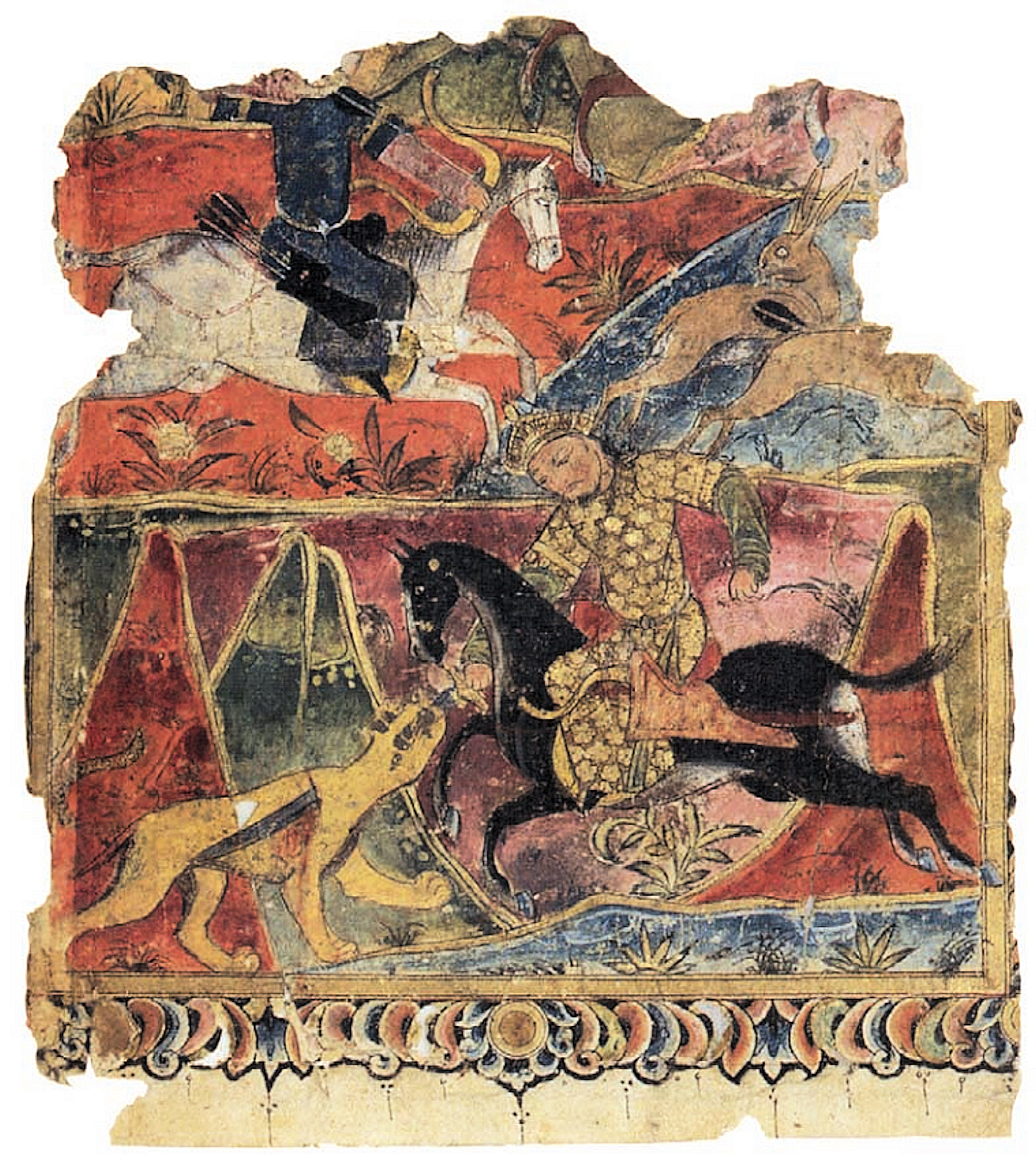
Horseriders in Mongol attire. Mu'nis al-ahrar, right frontispiece (fragment), 1341.

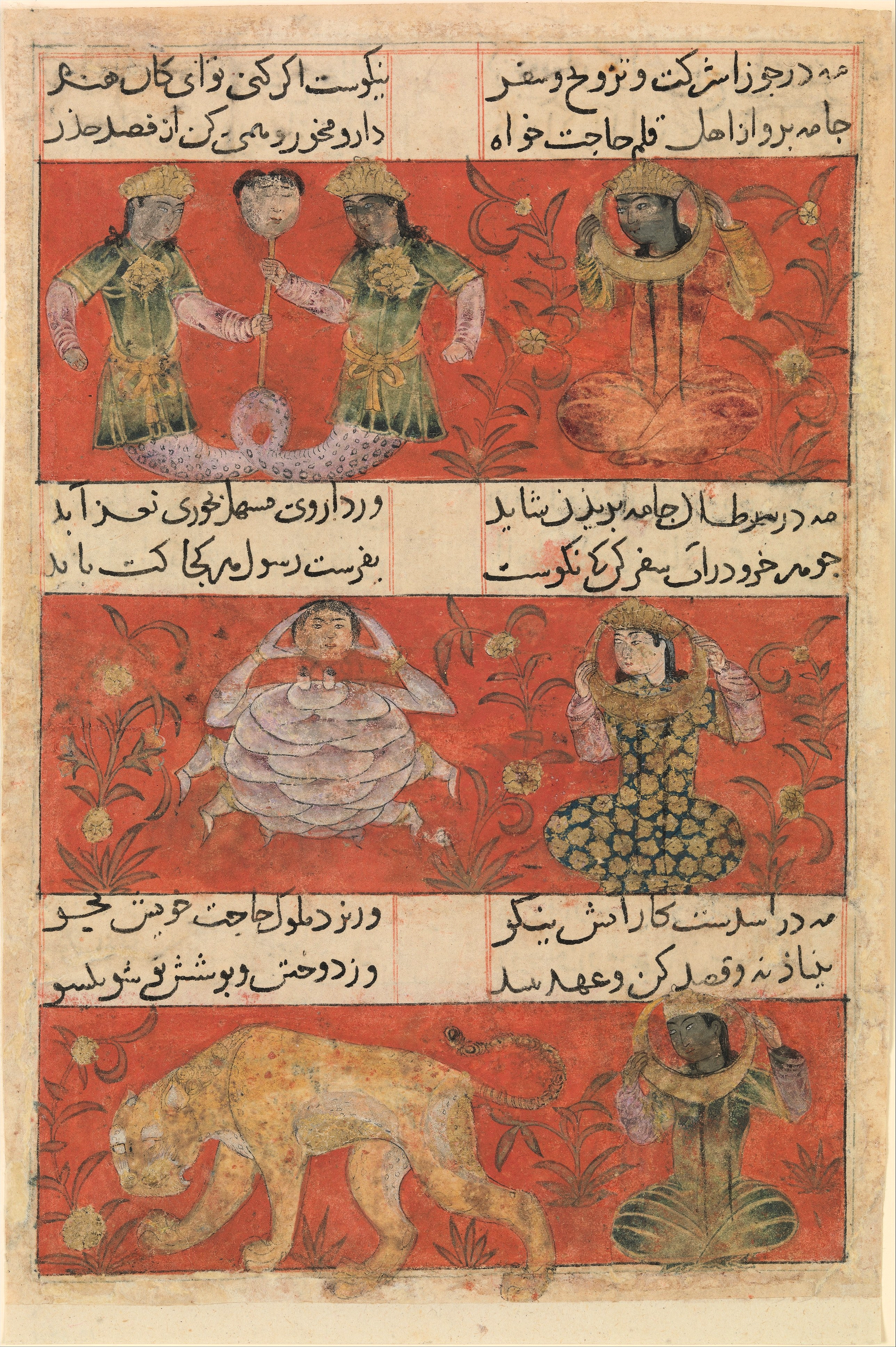
Folio from a Mu'nis al-ahrar; dated 741 AH/1340–41.

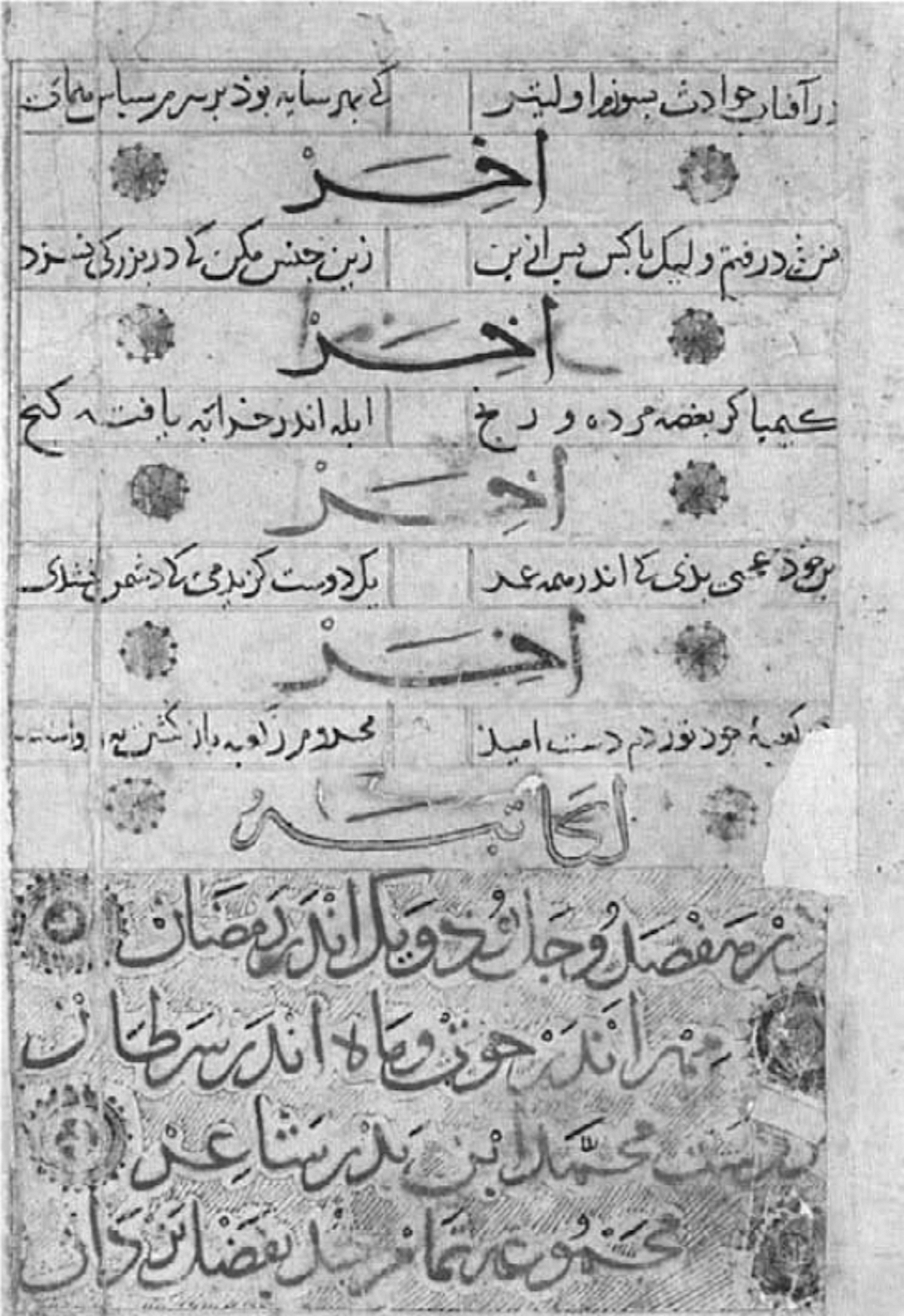
Mu'nis al-ahrar colophon with 1341 date.

== Sources ==
- Beelaert, Anna Livia (2008). "Jājarmi". In Yarshater, Ehsan (ed.). Encyclopædia Iranica. Vol. XIV/4: Jade III–Jamalzadeh, Mohammad-Ali II. Work. London and New York: Routledge & Kegan Paul. pp. 397–398. ISBN 978-1-934283-04-2.
- Carboni, Stefano (1994). Illustrated Poetry and Epic Images. Persian paintings of the 1330s and 1340s (PDF). New York: Metropolitan Museum of Art.
