= Death of Aftab Alam =

- Location: North Karachi
- Date: September 8, 2015 (PKT (+5 UTC))
- Attack type: Firearm
- Weapon: 0.9mm pistol
- Deaths: 5
- Victim: Aftab Alam
- Perpetrator: Suspects
- Motive: Provoke sectarian violence

Journalist Aftab Alam and four others were killed in several related attacks in North Karachi, Sindh, Pakistan. Alam was killed in a targeted attack by the Sipah-e-Muhammad Pakistan (SMP) to provoke sectarian violence in Pakistan, as he was from the Deobandi movement, and to attract widespread news coverage that a journalist's killing typically receives. At least four others were killed in the same terrorist operation.

== Aftab Alam ==
Aftab Alam was born around 1970. He lived with his extended family in the 11-C area of North Karachi, which is close to the Sir Syed market. On the day of his murder, he was arriving home from picking up his children from school. After the attack he died on the way to the hospital. He was 44 years old at the time of his murder.

Alam began his career with Geo TV, where he produced business news. He later joined Samaa TV as an assignment editor. In addition to his journalism, he worked at the Karachi Stock Exchange and was engaged in real estate. Unemployed at time of his death.

== Attacks ==
Aftab Alam
- Born: 1970; Pakistan
- Died: September 8, 2015 (aged 44–45); 11-C area of North Karachi
- Cause of death: Multiple gunshot wounds
- Occupation: TV Journalist
- Employer(s): Geo News, Samaa TV
- Movement: Deobandi movement

Karachi is the city in Pakistan where Aftab Alam was murdered, and is shown relative to Islamabad which is the capital of Pakistan.

The attack on Aftab Alam was carried out by Sipah-e-Muhammad Pakistan's Manzar Imam group, which is a Shiite terrorist group operating in Pakistan and Indian. Alam's name was on the group's hit list of members of the Deobandi movement.

The murders of Alam and others targeted by the group were timed to take place before the month of Muharram, which for the SMP is full of religious significance. Pakistani counter-terrorism in Karachi was bracing for further violence from Lashkar-e-Jhangvi, Sipah-e-Muhammad Pakistan (SMP), Mehdi Force, affiliates of the Tehrik-i-Taliban Pakistan, Jundullah, and al-Qaeda and reported that 86 people had been killed in 2015 from sectarian violence.

Aftab Alam was murdered the day after Geo TV's satellite technician Arshad Ali Jaffery, also transliterated as Jafri or Jaffari, was killed. At least four other journalists were killed in Pakistan in 2015.

Around the same time frame as Jaffery and Alam, another journalist, Abdul Azam, was shot three times in Peshawar, Khyber Pakhtunkhwa, Pakistan, which is close to the Afghanistan border.

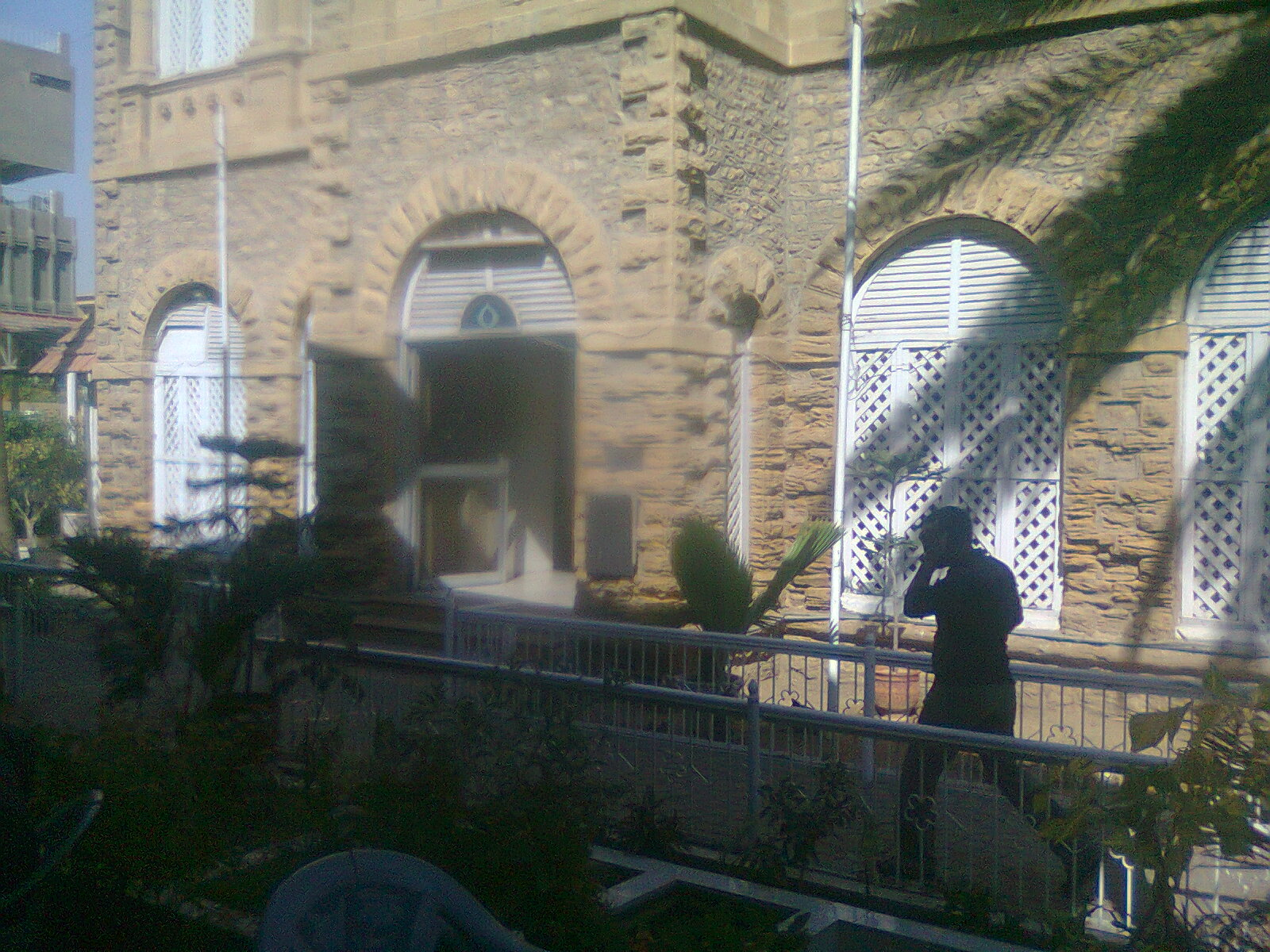
The Karachi Press Club is active after the death of two journalists over two days.

The Counter Terrorism Department arrested four suspects in the case, including Syed Zeeshan Haider Zaidi (known as Zeeshan Haider), who they say confessed to the crime, acted as mastermind, and was trained in Iran. Police fingered Zaidi as the leader of one of three teams and shooter and Adeel Raza as the driver of the motorcycle. According to the scenario sketched by police, the two pulled up on a motorcycle as Aftab was outside his home and Haider is believed to have shot him in the head. Alam took two bullets to his head and one other to his neck. The CTD spokesperson pointed to suspect Shah Gee, also transliterated as Ji, as the supplier of the 0.9mm pistol. Another team was led by Salman, also transliterated as Suleman. The same group from SMP was also held responsible by the CTD for killing two other men at a bakery in Nazimabad (5-B-1 area) of Karachi. The two men were also from the Deobandi sect. Another group was responsible for an attack that killed two at Rasheed Qaurma Hotel, also in Nazimabad.

The main motive of the terrorists was to stoke sectarian violence by targeting members of the Deobandi sect. The arrests were carried out between September 11 and 14 with Haider's arrest followed by the others implicated. A weapon and mobile phones were confiscated from the search and arrest.

== Reactions ==
The Karachi Union of Journalists held a protest immediately after the murders of Arsad Ali Jaffery and Aftab Alam at the Karachi Press Club.

Sindh Governor Dr. Ishratul Ebad Khan has condemned the killing of Jaffery and Alam. "The authorities need to further strengthen the existent security arrangements for the people, particularly journalists," he said.

Khurshid Abbasi, secretary general of the Pakistan Federal Union of Journalists (PFUJ), called the two murders a "conspiracy against the media."

Irina Bokova, director-general of UNESCO, "I condemn the killing of Arshad Ali Jaffari and Aftab Alam. Violence and fear must not be allowed to prevent journalists and media workers from doing their work. The safety of journalists and media workers is an essential condition for the press to keep the public informed. It is important that the authorities investigate these cases and bring those responsible for them to trial."

== See also ==
- Human rights in Pakistan
- Censorship in Pakistan
