= Jahangir Alam =

Jahangir Alam (Bengali: জাহাঙ্গীর আলম) is a Bengali masculine given name and may refer to:

- Jahangir Alam Sarkar (born 1948), Bangladeshi politician
- Jahangir Alam Khan (born 1952), Bangladeshi agricultural economist and researcher
- Jahangir Alam Chowdhury (born 1953), former Chief of the Bangladesh Rifles
- Md. Jahangir Alam (born 1960), Bangladeshi academic, earthquake expert, and vice-chancellor of Rajshahi University of Engineering & Technology
- Jahangir Alam (umpire) (born 1962), Bangladeshi cricket umpire
- Jahangir Alam Talukdar (born 1968), Bangladeshi cricketer
- Jahangir Alam (cricketer, born 1973), Bangladeshi cricketer
- Mohammad Jahangir Alam (born 1973), Bangladeshi army brigadier general
- Zahangir Alam (born 1979), Bangladeshi politician
- Zahangir Alam (chemist), Bangladeshi academic and vice-chancellor of Atish Dipankar University of Science and Technology
- Md Jahangir Alam, Bangladeshi academic and vice-chancellor of Jatiya Kabi Kazi Nazrul Islam University
- Jahangir Alam (cricketer, born 1991), Bangladeshi cricketer
- Zahangir Alam (diplomat), former Ambassador of Bangladesh to Uzbekistan
