= Arish Alam =

Indian cricketer

Personal information
- Born: 19 November 1986 (age 39); Jalaun, Uttar Pradesh, India
- Batting: Right-handed
- Bowling: Right arm off break
- Role: Batsman

Domestic team information
- Years: Team
- 2005/06–2014/15: Uttar Pradesh

Career statistics
Competition	FC	LA	T20
Matches	24	7	3
Runs scored	1119	133	99
Batting average	34.96	22.16	33.00
100s/50s	3/5	0/1	0/0
Top score	118*	53	39
Balls bowled	804	198	54
Wickets	24	5	1
Bowling average	43.70	26.80	60.00
5 wickets in innings	0	0	0
10 wickets in match	0	0	0
Best bowling	2/18	4/42	1/20
Catches/stumpings	22/–	0/–	2/–
- Source: CricketArchive, 22 May 2016

Arish Alam (born 19 November 1986) is an Indian cricketer, who played first-class cricket for Uttar Pradesh. He was a batsman, and off break bowler.

== Career ==
In 2004, Alam represented the Central team in the Hemu Adhikari Memorial inter-Academy cricket tournament. He made his first-class debut for Uttar Pradesh against Haryana in a 2005/06 Ranji Trophy match; Alam scored 19 and 13. In 2011, he represented Unity Cricket Club in the SS Hussain Memorial State Cricket Tournament match; in the final against Lucknow Cricket Academy, Alam scored 63, and took 3/27. Alam was also awarded the "Man of the Series" award for the tournament. In the 2012–13 Ranji Trophy, Alam scored centuries in matches for Uttar Pradesh against Baroda and Vidarbha.
