= Gazi Alamgir =

Bangladeshi cricketer (born 1982)

Gazi Mohammad Alamgir (born 15 December 1982 in Chittagong) is a Bangladeshi former first-class cricketer active 2003–2008 who played for Chittagong Division. He was a right-handed batsman and a right-arm fast medium pace bowler.
