= Alamgir Khan =

Alamgir Khan may refer to:

- Alamgir Khan (politician), Pakistani activist and politician
- Alamgir Khan (cricketer) (born 1978), Pakistani cricketer
- Alamgir Khan (footballer) (born 1991), Pakistani footballer
- Alamgir Khan (singer), Indian playback singer
- Alamgir Hyder Khan (1954–2016), Bangladeshi politician
