= Javeed Alam =

Activist, intellectual

- Born: 12 August 1943; State of Hyderabad
- Died: 5 December 2016 (aged 72)
- Occupation: Academician
- Known for: Activist, Thinker

Javeed Alam (12 August 1943 – 5 December 2016) was an activist and thinker who served as Chairman of the Indian Council for Social Science Research from 2008 to 2011.

== Early life ==
Javeed Alam was born to Khadija and Alam Khundmiri in the erstwhile State of Hyderabad that was ruled by the Nizam of Hyderabad. His parents were leftist activists in Hyderabad and his family were deeply involved in the Telangana struggle of the peasantry. He completed his BA and MA degrees at Osmania University, getting a gold medal for standing first in the MA. He did his PhD at the Indian School of International Studies (ISIS), Delhi, and got his doctorate from Jawaharlal Nehru University (JNU) since ISIS was merged with JNU.

== Activism and career ==
Alam, described as a Marxist, was associated with the CPI(M) since the 1970s. His teaching career at Delhi University’s Salwan College was terminated since he married Jayanti Guha, a Hindu. This led to a larger agitation that was backed by the Teachers' association and defended the secular character of the University. From 1973 to 1999 he taught at Himachal Pradesh University (HPU). He returned to Hyderabad in the late 1990s and taught at the English and Foreign Languages University from which he retired in 2005. He was Chairman of the Indian Council for Social Science Research from 2008 to 2011.

== Publications ==
- Dissent and Domination: Peasants and Politics (1985)
- India: Living With Modernity (1999)
- Who Wants Democracy? (2004)
- Gandhi: A Philosophical Debate (Special Issue of Social Scientist, May–June 2006).
