= Olam (network) =

Jewish non-profit organization

OLAM
- Founded: 2015
- Founder: Alliance for Global Good; Charles and Lynn Schusterman Family Philanthropies; Pears Foundation
- Founded at: Israel
- Headquarters: Jerusalem
- Chief executive officer: Dyonna Ginsburg
- Website: olamtogether.org

Olam (stylized OLAM) is a network of Jewish and Israeli organizations that work in the fields of global service, international development and humanitarian aid. It was launched in 2015 by the Alliance for Global Good, Charles and Lynn Schusterman Family Philanthropies, and the Pears Foundation.

The organization's name derives from the Hebrew term tikkun olam, which translates in English to "repairing the world" and is one of the "central tenets of Jewish tradition". As of 2024, Olam works with 81 partner organizations.
