= Mohammad Habibul Alam =

Bangladeshi leader in Scouting

- হাবিবুল আলম

Vice-Chairman of the World Scout Committee

Personal details
- Education: Dhaka Residential Model College
- Awards: 334th Bronze Wolf Award

Mohammad Habibul Alam (Bengali: হাবিবুল আলম, born May 15, 1950, in Dhaka, Bangladesh) served as the vice-chairman of the World Scout Committee as well as vice-president and chairman, International Committee of the Bangladesh Scouts.

In 2012, he was awarded the 334th Bronze Wolf Award, the only distinction of the World Organization of the Scout Movement, awarded by the World Scout Committee for exceptional services to world Scouting.

He attended Dhaka Residential Model College. He lives in Dhaka, Bangladesh.
