= Independent Filmmakers Cooperative of Ottawa =

Independent Filmmakers Co-operative of Ottawa
- Formation: 1992
- Type: Co-operative
- Location: Ottawa, Ontario, Canada
- Executive Director: Patrice James
- Website: www.ifco.ca

Independent Filmmakers Co-operative of Ottawa (IFCO) is a Co-operative that supports independent filmmakers in Ottawa, Ontario, Canada by providing low-cost equipment rentals, workshops, grants, and promotions. Membership fees are $80 ($25 for students) and full membership privileges are granted to members who donate at least 20 volunteer hours in service to the co-operative.

== Objects of the association ==
The Independent Filmmakers Co-operative of Ottawa (IFCO) is a centre for artists who express their ideas, values and experiences using the medium of film. IFCO provides, on a co-operative basis, training, facilities, equipment, funding, information resources and means to exhibit work. IFCO aims to encourage a critical discourse in and an historical appreciation of film and to develop, support and sustain an innovative and diverse Ottawa-based community of artists.

According to the IFCO's bylaws, the objects of the association are to:

1. focus specifically on the cultural aspects of filmmaking;
2. foster independent filmmaking and to ensure that complete creative control of works produced is retained by the filmmaker;
3. provide equipment, facilities, and funds for the production of independent films by IFCO members;
4. nurture beginning filmmakers by providing facilities and instruction for training and to encourage originality;
5. promote public interest and awareness of independent filmmaking in the Ottawa area;
6. gather and share information relevant to the production of independent films.

== History ==
IFCO was created in the summer of 1991. It began as a result of the vision of a small, enthusiastic group of up-and-coming filmmakers. This vision was to create an organization which provided filmmakers in the Ottawa area with the facilities, training and funds required to make independent Super 8mm, 16mm and/or 35mm films. IFCO remains, to this day, the only organization which provides this service in Ottawa.

IFCO initially consisted of five founding members (Monica Szentesky, Scott Galley, Wayne Meade, David Chow and Glen Cross) and several volunteers who helped initiate and develop the programs and services that IFCO offered to the region. IFCO was incorporated as a non-profit co-operative corporation in January 1992, and in June 1992 received office space in the Arts Court Building, located in the heart of downtown Ottawa. In June 2009 IFCO became a registered charity.

== Funding ==
IFCO receives funding from the Canada Council for the Arts, The Ontario Arts Council and the City of Ottawa, as well as earned revenues through workshop fees, equipment rentals, fundraisers, and annual membership dues; plus in-kind and/or financial support from foundations, private funders and corporate sponsors.

== Controversy ==
IFCO was involved in a brief controversy in 2004 when its selection committee chose to grant $1000 to fund a film by Ken Takahashi. The film, to be entitled Last Night With Jesse, was to involve a sexual relationship between an adolescent boy and an older man. When word of the grant and the film subject got out following an article by Susannah Sears, a freelancer, who creates crossword puzzles for the Ottawa Citizen, there was quick criticism of public money funding a film "promoting pedophilia". With city councillors threatening to withdraw city funding and Ontario's Minister of Culture saying that she was "uncomfortable with government funding for any film that depicts a sexual relationship between an adult and a child", the IFCO's board quickly quashed the grant citing concerns about the legality of the film. The IFCO board stated that Takahashi couldn't confirm whether he planned to use a minor as an actor and therefore could contravene a bill, which became federal law July 20, 2005, that eliminates artistic merit as a defense for those accused of making child pornography.

Takahashi said the issue was "blown out of proportion" and that his movie would not have contained any graphic depictions of sexual relations between a minor and an adult. He described his film as a coming of age story about "a relationship between an older man and an individual coming into sexual maturation". IFCO denied that the public outcry or threats of funding losses played any part in the decision and that they would have likely funded the film with a reassurance from Takahashi that a person of the age of majority would play the part.
