= L'Hebdo Magazine =

News magazine in Lebanon (1956–2019)

- Cover of L'Hebdo Magazine
- Categories: News magazine
- Frequency: Weekly
- Founded: 1956
- Final issue: December 2019
- Country: Lebanon
- Based in: Beirut

L'Hebdo Magazine, more commonly as Magazine, was a French-language weekly magazine published in Beirut, Lebanon. It was launched in 1956. The magazine ceased publication in 2019 due to the low level of revenues.
