= Ifco tray =

Type of reusable packaging

IFCO trays (also known as RPCs, the abbreviation for reusable packaging containers, or as reusable containers, or reusable crates) are a type of reusable packaging for transporting fresh food produce. IFCO SYSTEMS is the name of the company that first developed a pooling service for reusable plastic trays for fresh produce in 1992, when the company was founded in Pullach, Germany. IFCO is the acronym for International Food Container Organization.

They are attractive for environmental reasons due to their ease of reuse, their capability of being stacked when full of produce in many different configurations and their ability to be flattened when empty for compact return to producers/shippers/growers or for storage purposes.

== Reusable packaging ==
The IFCO RPCs and trays are used for transporting perishable products and are available in different designs customized to the requirements of the produce. There are IFCO trays for fresh food, fruit and vegetables, bananas, baked goods, eggs, dairy, convenience foods, meat and fish.

== Zero Waste ==
When the IFCO trays reach the end of their service life and can no longer be repaired, they are granulated and made into new IFCO RPCs. The raw material stream for the IFCO reusable crates is fully traceable. The company uses 100% of the available material from the broken or end-of-use crates. The IFCO trays generally have a life span of more than 10 years, before they are made into new crates. There is no packaging waste and there is a 100% material reutilization.

== Pooling ==
IFCO trays are only available through the IFCO pooling service. Customers of the service share the reusable containers in a continuous closed loop. IFCO SYSTEMS refer to this pooling loop as the IFCO SmartCycle.

IFCO supplies the reusable containers to farmers and producers of fresh produce and perishable items. Customers that use the SmartCycle are supplied with clean, sanitized IFCO RPCs at harvest or at the end of the production cycle. The produce is shipped or transported in the reusable plastic containers on pallets to the retailers, where the produce generally goes on display at the Point of Sale in the IFCO trays. This reduces the number of touchpoints with the produce and aims to reduce the potential for produce damage and waste, extending the shelf life of the fresh food produce in the process.

When empty and used, the reusable containers are recovered and returned to the IFCO wash centers, where they are checked, repaired (if necessary), washed, and then supplied to customers and used again.

== Circular economy model ==
The IFCO pooling service of RPCs and material reutilization is based on the circular economy model, which promotes the reuse, sharing, repair, refurbishment, remanufacturing and recycling within a closed-loop system in order to avoid waste and reduce the environmental impact of industrial designs.

== Sustainability ==
Compared to disposable products and packaging, reusable containers help reduce the overall environmental impact of the fresh grocery supply chain.

As the IFCO trays can be folded compactly, they require less space in the reverse logistics as they are mainly the same size and are therefore compatible when folded. More IFCO RPCs can be stacked in trucks and in storage, saving food miles, energy consumption and storage costs.
