= Yakub =

- Gender: male

Other names
- Related names: Jacob, Jakub, Yacob, Yakup

Yakub, Yaqub, Yaqoob, Yaqoub, Yacoub, Yakoob, Yakoub, Yoqub or Yaâkub (Arabic: يعقوب, romanized: Yaʿqūb or Ya'kūb, also transliterated in other ways; Yakob, as commonly westernized) is a male given name. It is the Arabic version of Jacob and James. The Arabic form Ya'qūb/Ya'kūb may be direct from the Hebrew or indirectly through Syriac. The name was in use in pre-Islamic Arabia and is a common given name in Arab, Turkish, and Muslim societies. It is also used as a surname. It is common in Polish, Czech, Slovak, Belarusian and Bosnian languages, where it is transliterated as Jakub.

== Given name ==
=== Pre-modern world ===
Ordered chronologically

- Yaˈqub bin Isḥāq bin Ibrāhīm (Jacob), prophet of Islam
- Ya'qub ibn Tariq (died 796), Persian astronomer and mathematician
- Yaqub ibn Ibrahim al-Ansari (729–798), chief judge during the reign of Harun al-Rashid
- Yaqub al-Mansur (died 1199), third Almohad ruler, who reigned from 1184 to his death in 1199
- Yaqub Ibn as-Sikkit (died 857), philologist tutor, grammarian and scholar of poetry
- Ya'qub ibn al-Layth al-Saffar (840–879), Persian leader, founder of the Saffarid dynasty of Sistan
- Ya'qub ibn Killis (930–991), Egyptian vizier
- Yakub I of Germiyan (died 1340), founder of the Germiyanid beylik
- Yaqub al-Charkhi (1360–1447), Naqshbandi Sheykh and student of Khwaja Baha' al-Din Naqshband
- Yakub Çelebi (1362–1389), Ottoman prince, son of Sultan Murad I
- Yaqub Spata (1369–1416), last lord of Arta
- Yakub II (died 1429), bey of Germiyan
- Yaqub al-Mustamsik (died 1521), figurehead caliph of the Mamluk Sultanate

=== Modern world ===
- Yacoub G. Al-Atrash (born 1978), Palestinian composer and maestro
- Yacoub Al-Mohana (born 1975), Kuwaiti film and music director
- Yacoub Artin (1842–1919), ethnic Armenian educator and scholar
- Yakub Beg of Yettishar (1820–1877), Emir of Yettishar
- Yacoub Sidi Ethmane (born 1995), Mauritanian footballer
- Yacoub Makzoume (born 1995), Syrian tennis player
- Yacoub Masboungi (born 1948), Lebanese former swimmer
- Yacoub Romanos (1935–2011), Lebanese wrestler
- Yacoub Sarraf (born 1961), Lebanese politician
- Yacoub Shaheen (born 1994), Palestinian singer
- Yacoub Zaiadeen (1922–2015), Jordanian politician and surgeon
- Yacub Addy (1931–2014), Ghanaian drummer, composer, choreographer and educator
- Yakub Ali Chowdhury (1888–1940), Bengali essayist
- Yakub Ali, politician
- Yakub Cemil (1883–1916), Ottoman soldier in the 1913 Ottoman coup d'état
- Yakub Guznej (1892–??), Belarusian socio-political and military leader
- Yakub Hasan Sait (1875–1940), Indian businessman, freedom-fighter and politician
- Yakub Holovatsky (1814–1888), Galician historian, literary scholar, ethnographer, linguist, bibliographer, lexicographer, and poet
- Yakub Idrizov (born 1993), Bulgarian footballer
- Yakub Kadri Karaosmanoğlu (1889–1974), Turkish diplomat
- Yakub Khan Mehboob Khan (1904–1958), Indian film actor and director
- Yakub Kolas (1882–1956), Belarusian writer
- Yakub Memon (1962–2015), Indian terrorist
- Yakub Shah Chak (1565–1593), last native ruler of Kashmir
- Yakub Shevki Pasha (1876–1939), General of the Ottoman Army and Turkish Army
- Yaqoob Al-Qasmi (born 1990), Omani footballer
- Yaqoob Ali (born 1980), Pakistani-born Irish cricketer
- Yaqoob Bizanjo, Pakistani politician
- Yaqoob Butt (born 1988), footballer
- Yaqoob Juma Al-Mukhaini (born 1982), Omani footballer
- Yaqoob Salem Eid (born 1996), Bahraini sprinter
- Yaqoub Al-Balochi (born 1990), Emirati footballer
- Yaqoub Alhassan (born 2001), Saudi Arabian footballer
- Yaqoub Al Hosani (born 1987), Emirati footballer
- Yacoub Al-Mohana (born 1975), Kuwaiti film and musical director
- Yaqoub Al Taher (born 1983), Kuwaiti footballer
- Yaqoub Al-Tararwa (born 1994), Kuwaiti footballer
- Yaqoub Al-Youha (born 1993), Kuwaiti sprint runner
- Yaqoub Yousif (born 1997), Emirati footballer
- Yaqub al-Ghusayn (1899–1947), Palestinian leader
- Yaqub Ali Sharif, politician
- Yaqub Eyyubov (born 1945), Azerbaijani politician
- Yaqub Kareem, Nigerian boxer of the 2000s and 2010s
- Yaqub Mirza (born 1946), Pakistani businessman
- Yaqub Qureishi (born 1959), Indian politician
- Yaqub Salimov, Tajik politician
- Yaqub Sanu (1839–1912), Egyptian journalist
- Yoqub Ahmedov (1938–2025), Uzbek actor

== Surname ==
- Abdul Razzak Yaqoob (1944–2014), Pakistani expatriate businessman based in Dubai
- Ahmad Muin Yaacob, Malaysian convicted murderer
- Aminata Aboubakar Yacoub (born 1989), Republic of the Congo swimmer
- Antonio Yakoub (born 2002), Swedish footballer
- Asif Yaqoob (born 1973), Pakistani cricket umpire
- Atta Yaqub (born 1979), Scottish model and actor of Pakistani descent
- Badr Al-Yaqoub (1946–2025), Kuwaiti professor of law and politician
- Charles Yacoub, Lebanese-Canadian bus hijacker
- Chaudhry Yaqoob, Pakistani police officer
- Gabriel Yacoub (1952–2025), French musician, songwriter, and visual artist
- Hala Al-Abdallah Yacoub (born 1956), Syrian cinematographer and director
- Ilyas Yakoub (1903–1958), Indonesian journalist
- Jasem Yaqoub (born 1953), Kuwaiti footballer
- Joseph Yacoub (born 1944), Syrian professor
- Magdi Yacoub (born 1935), Egyptian-British professor
- Mirza Yaqoob (born 1974), Bahraini cricketer
- Mohammad Yakub, Indian cricketer
- Mohammad Yaqoob (born 1990), eldest son of Mullah Mohammed Omar
- Mohammed Yaqoub (disambiguation), multiple people
- Muhammad Hussein Yacoub (born 1956), Arab Islamic scholar
- Muhammad ibn Ya'qub al-Kulayni (868–941), Persian Shia hadith collector
- Muhammad Yaqub (born 1937), a Pakistani banker
- Musa Yakub, Bruneian military officer
- Paola Yacoub (born 1966), Lebanese-born artist
- Rami Yacoub (born 1975), Swedish-Palestinian record producer and songwriter
- Reham Yacoub (1991–2020), Iraqi human rights advocate and doctor
- Roman Yakub (born 1958), American composer
- Rutaba Yaqub, Saudi Arabian singer
- Sahibzada Muhammad Yaqoob (born 1952), Pakistani politician
- Salma Yaqoob (born 1971), British political activist
- Septar Mehmet Yakub (1904–1991), Crimean Tatar lawyer, thinker, and spiritual leader
- Sidi Yacoub (disambiguation), multiple people
- Simon Yacoub (born 1989), Palestinian judoka
- Souheila Yacoub (born 1992), Swiss gymnast and actress
- Talat Yaqoob, a Scottish campaigner, writer, and commentator
- Walaa Eldin Yaqoub (born 2000), Sudanese footballer
- Waleed Yaqub (born 1974), Pakistani cricket umpire
- Younes Yaqoub (born 1986), Qatari footballer
- Zara Mahamat Yacoub, Chadian filmmaker, director and journalist

== See also ==
- Yacob, a list of people with the given name, surname or patronymic Yacob or Yaqob
- Yakup, Turkish form of the name
- Al Yaqoub Tower, a skyscraper in Dubai, United Arab Emirates
- Yaqub-Har, pharaoh of ancient Egypt who reigned in the 17th or 16th century BCE
