= Arab Idol season 4 =

Arab Idol
- Season 4

Release
- Original network: MBC 1
- Original release: 4 November 2016 – 25 February 2017

Season chronology
- ← Previous; Season 3

After more than a year-long hiatus, the fourth series of Arab Idol was relaunched on MBC, with its premiere on 4 November 2016. Once again, just like in the previous season, the jury was composed of singers Wael Kfoury, Nancy Ajram, and Ahlam, as well as music producer Hassan El Shafei, and Ahmad Fahmi returned as host of the show. The first four episodes covered the first round of the show, the auditions process, which took place in nine different Arab countries and, for the first time ever, in Turkey. Although thousands of hopefuls put forth their candidacy, only 64 went through to the second round of auditions in Beirut, Lebanon by the end of which, the 25 semi-finalists were picked to go through to the third round, the live show. The Palestinian contestant Yaacoub Shaheen won the title.

== Judges ==
There was no change in judges from season held in 2014. The judges for the season were:

- Wael Kfoury - singer from Lebanon
- Nancy Ajram - singer from Lebanon
- Ahlam - singer from United Arab Emirates
- Hassan El Shafei - composer, record producer from Egypt

== Auditions ==
The candidates who qualified successfully are listed below. Each candidate is from the host country, unless otherwise stated.

Morocco

- Nisreen El Safi
- Hajar Idelhaj – she was notable because of her ability to sing in not only Arabic but also Hindi.
- Ikram Farraj
- Maysaa Aynas
- Yasmine Chellah
- Iman Foudaib
- Sakina Elhagamy
- Kaoutar Berrani
- Hamza Essaoui

Jordan

- Rawan Aalyan (Palestine)
- Muhannad Alkhatib
- Mohammed Alhawari
- Muhannad Hussein

Turkey

- Ahmed Aldosh (Syria) – disappeared before the group challenge.
- Mohammed Ben Saleh (Tunisia)
- Houssam Al Shoueikhi (Tunisia)
- Matti Sobo (Iraq)
- Fouad Al-Hitar (Saudi Arabia)

Algeria

- Mohammed Fergani – he played an Oud while auditioning.
- Manal Hadly
- Yousef Hamani
- Kawther Khawatmiya – later known as Kamelya Wared. The name change was possibly due to some conflict with judge Nancy Ajram.
- Aya Baghdadi
- Mohammed Saleh

Iraq

- Mohammed Hamza
- Asher Alwaleed
- Ayman Amin
- Houmam Abdulrazak – later known as Houmam Ibrahim. Before his stint in Arab Idol, he was already a well-known singer in Iraq, and had enjoyed minor chart success with a song, "Ma erftani" (You don't know me).
- Muhannad Jassem
- Bejan Jaza

Palestine

- Yacoub Shaheen
- Ameer Dandan
- Nader Hammouda
- Ghianna Ghantous
- Shadi Dakwar
- Nancy Hawa – disappeared before the group challenge; apparently she had voluntarily withdrawn.
- Linda Zamil
- Nadine Khatib
- Said Tarabay

Bahrain

- Abdallah Alkhelifi (from Yemen; but he told the judges he was from Saudi Arabia)
- Badr Al Hassan

Lebanon

- Mahmoud Othman (Syria)
- Aamer Sidawi
- Ibrahim Malouhi
- Tamer Daher
- Waleed Bechara
- Rabih Rabal
- Hussein al Masri
- Rabii Zayyoud (Syria) (he was first eliminated, then qualified successfully after judge Nancy Ajram decided to give him a chance)

United Arab Emirates

- Murshid Atta (Saudi Arabia) – had previously taken part in Arab Idol Season 2 and qualified. In Season 4, he qualified again, but had apparently disappeared before the group challenge.
- Amani Mubarak (Saudi Arabia)
- Ammar Mohammed (Yemen)
- Umniah Hassan (Egypt)
- Munad Abdo (Sudan)
- Bandar Mougri (Saudi Arabia)

Egypt

- Mohammed Moustafa
- Amal Ibrahim (Jordan)
- Dalia Saeed
- Omar Hamdy
- Israa Gamal
- Mohammed Said
- Samar Al Husseini
- Erfan Mohammed
- Ahmed Aljarrah

== Second round ==
This round began with the 64 candidates' arrival to Beirut, Lebanon. Before settling down, the beginning of the group challenge was announced to the candidates by host Ahmad Fahmi. In pre-determined groups of four to six people, these small groups had to each perform a pre-determined song in front of the jury, immediately after which, performers deemed not good enough to continue were cut from the competition. The songs chosen for this round and the results are as follows.

For the female contestants:

Group 1 Group name: Safar Al-Angham (Travel of the Melodies) Song choice: "Galaw habibak Missafer" by Thekra

- Kaoutar Berrani (Morocco) (group leader) – Advanced
- Yasmine Chellah (Morocco) – Advanced
- Iman Foudaib (Morocco) – Advanced
- Sakina Elhagamy (Morocco) – Advanced
- Amani Mubarak (Saudi Arabia) – Advanced

This group comprised four Moroccans and a Saudi. They rendered the late Thekra Mohammed's hit song "Messafer". When their result was announced, judge Ahlam attempted to test the group members' patience by saying that "only one person" had advanced – and that person was "Safar Al-Angham", in other words, the whole group had advanced successfully. All five group members erupted into spontaneous applause.

Group 2 Song choice: "El Areeb minnak Baeed" by Najat El Saghira

- Linda Zamil (Palestine) (group leader) – Advanced
- Samar Al Husseini (Egypt) – Advanced
- Rawan Aalyan (Palestine) – Advanced
- Hajar Idelhaj (Morocco) – Eliminated. She could be seen in tears while judge Hassan El Shafei was halfway speaking to her.

Group 3 Song choice: "Samahtak" by Assala Nasri

- Ikram Farraj (Morocco) (group leader) – Eliminated
- Maysaa Aynas (Morocco) – Eliminated. At one point while she was singing, judge Nancy Ajram was shaking her head in disapproval.
- Dalia Saeed (Egypt) – Advanced
- Israa Gamal (Egypt) – Advanced
- Rula Azar (Palestine) – Advanced

Group 4 Song choice: "Aala Bali" by Sherine Abdel Wahab

- Aya Baghdadi (Algeria) (group leader) – Eliminated
- Nisreen El Safi (Morocco) – Eliminated
- Umniah Hassan (Egypt) – Eliminated
- Amal Ibrahim (Jordan) – Eliminated

This team had a problem with the song that they chose. It turned out that the song, "Aala Bali" by Sherine Abdel Wahab, was not suited for their voices. This had a major impact on their performance and led to the elimination of all the members in this group.

Group 5 Group name: Jazairastin (Algeria and Palestine) Song choice: "Ahou Dalli Sar" by Sayyid Darwich

- Nadine Khatib (Palestine) (group leader) – Advanced
- Ghianna Ghantous (Palestine) – Advanced
- Kamelya Wared (Algeria) – Advanced
- Amal Shaheen (Palestine) – Advanced
- Manal Hadly (Algeria) – Advanced

This team was distinguished by not only the voices of the participants, but also the commonalities that brought them together. The participants were of either Palestinian or Algerian nationality, which inspired their group name, Jazairastin – a portmanteau of "Jazair" (Algeria) and "Falastin" (Palestine). Their creative rendition of Fairuz's "Ahou Dalli Sar" ensured survival of all the members of their team to advance to the next round.

For the male contestants:

Group 1 Group name: Altuyur (Bird) Song choice: "Walla Ya Teir" by Fadel Shaker

- Mohammed Moustafa (Egypt) (group leader) – Advanced
- Mohammed Ben Saleh (Tunisia) – Advanced
- Aamer Sidawi (Lebanon) – Eliminated
- Rabii Zayyoud (Syria) – Advanced
- Shadi Dakwar (Palestine) – Advanced
- Mohammed Said (Egypt) – Advanced

Group 2 Song choice: "Sallamtak Bi Id Allah" by Kadim Al Sahir

- Muhannad Jassem (Iraq) (group leader) – Eliminated
- Hussein Al Masri (Lebanon) – Eliminated
- Matti Sobo (Iraq) – Eliminated
- Ayman Amin (Iraq) – Eliminated
- Humam Ibrahim (Iraq) – Advanced
- Muhannad Hussein (Jordan) – Advanced

Group 3 Song choice: "Zeina Lebset Khelkhalha" by Samir Yazbek

- Mohammed Al Saleh (Algeria) (group leader) – Eliminated
- Tamer Daher (Lebanon) – Advanced
- Muhannad Al Khatib (Jordan) – Advanced
- Asher Alwaleed (Iraq) – Eliminated
- Waleed Bechara (Lebanon) – Advanced
- Saeed Tarabih (Palestine) – Eliminated

Group 4 Group name: Jalsa (Meetup) Song choice: "Ya Munyati", popular Yemeni song

- Badr Al Hassan (Bahrain) (group leader) – Advanced
- Abdallah Alkhelifi (Yemen) – Advanced
- Bandar Mougri (Saudi Arabia) – Advanced
- Ammar Mohammed (Yemen) – Advanced
- Fouad Al-Hitar (Saudi Arabia) – Advanced

This group was composed entirely of Gulf citizens. Their rendition of a popular Yemeni song, completely captivated the jury – so much so that judges Hassan El Shafei and Ahlam gave them a standing ovation at the end. All members of this group qualified for the next stage successfully.

Group 5 Group name: Alkhultat Alsihria (Magic Mix) Song choice: "Aannabi" by Karem Mahmoud

- Munad Abdo (Sudan) (group leader) – Eliminated
- Omar Hamdy (Egypt) – Eliminated
- Nader Hammouda (Palestine) – Advanced
- Ibrahim Malouhi (Lebanon)- Eliminated
- Mohammed Alhawari (Jordan) – Eliminated
- Mohammed Fergani (Algeria) – Advanced

This team comprised six members, each from a different Arab country – which inspired their group name Alkhultat Alsihria (Magic Mix). They performed a song "Annabi", but their magic mix unfortunately did not captivate the jury. Out of their six members, only two – Nader Hammouda and Mohammed Fergani – successfully advanced.

Group 6 Group name: Alwahda (Unity) Song choice: "Khallas Tarak" by Saber Rebai

- Rabih Rahal (Lebanon) (group leader) – Eliminated
- Hussein Mohammed (Egypt) – Advanced
- Bejan Jaza (Iraq) – Eliminated
- Mohammed Hamza (Iraq) – Eliminated
- Ahmed Aljarrah (Egypt) – Eliminated
- Youssef Hamani (Algeria) – Eliminated

Comprising mostly Iraqis and Egyptians, this group was the most unfortunate of the male groups – largely due to the lack of harmony and chemistry between the group members during the performance of the song. The jury decided to allow only one member of this group, Hussein Mohammed of Egypt, to advance.

Group 7 Group name: Assalam (Peace) Song choice: "Ya Salat El Zein" by Sayed Mekawy

- Ameer Dandan (Palestine) (group leader) – Advanced
- Kefah Rustam (Lebanon) – Advanced
- Yacoub Shaheen (Palestine) – Advanced
- Houssam Al Shoueikhi (Tunisia) – Advanced
- Mahmoud Othman (Syria) – Advanced
- Hamza Essaoui (Morocco) – Advanced

This team's rendition of a Sayed Mekawy piece, brought a rousing end to the group challenge, once again with a standing ovation from the judges, as well as all six members advancing successfully to the next round.

By the end of the group challenge, 40 contestants remained : 16 female contestants out of the original 23, and 24 male contestants out of 41. These 40 remaining competitors then had to pick one last song, from a list of 14, for their final individual challenge before the Top 24 is picked. This year, however, a maximum of six people could pick the same song, adding to the pressure competitors had to endure, as it was done on a first-come-first-served basis.

The 14 songs in the individual challenge, and the contestants who chose each song, are as follows:

"Ouli Aamalak Eih" by Mohammed Abdel Wahab

- Israa Gamal (Egypt) – Advanced
- Samar Al Husseini (Egypt) – Advanced
- Mohammed Moustafa (Egypt) – Advanced
- Mohammed Said (Egypt) – Advanced
- Nader Hammouda (Palestine) – Advanced

"Ya Tira Tiri" by Sabah Fakhri

- Houssam El Shouekhi (Tunisia) – Advanced. Judge Wael Kfoury actually joined in the singing at one point.
- Rabii Zayyoud (Syria) – Advanced
- Hussein Muhammad (Egypt) – Advanced
- Mahmoud Othman (Syria) – Eliminated. His performance was especially shocking to judge Wael Kfoury.

"El Oyoun El Soud" by Warda Al Jazairiah

- Dalia Saeed (Egypt) – Advanced
- Rawan Aalyan (Palestine) – initially eliminated, but later Advanced after the jury decided to give her a second chance
- Kaoutar Berrani (Morocco) – Advanced
- Kamelya Wared (Algeria) – Advanced

"Laila bterjaa ya layl" by Fairuz

- Nadine Khatib (Palestine) – Advanced
- Yasmine Chellah (Morocco) – Eliminated

"Eiratni belchib" by Nazem Al-Ghazali

- Houmam Ibrahim (Iraq) – Advanced

"Rasayel" by Mohammed Abdo

- Fouad Al-Hitar (Saudi Arabia) – Eliminated. Judge Ahlam appeared shocked by his performance.
- Bandar Mougri (Saudi Arabia) – Advanced

"Ahebbak law takun hader" by Talal Maddah

- Badr Al Hassan (Bahrain) – Advanced
- Abdallah Alkhelifi (Yemen)- Advanced
- Amani Mubarak (Saudi Arabia) – Eliminated
- Iman Foudaib (Morocco) – Eliminated

"Kama al Reisha" by Abu Bakr Salem

- Ammar Mohammed (Yemen) – Advanced

"Eldayia" by Sabah

- Amal Shaheen (Palestine) – Eliminated

"Emta Hataraf" by Asmahan

- Mohammed Fergani (Algeria) – Eliminated

"Weli Law Yedroun" by Moeen Charif

- Ameer Dandan (Palestine) – Advanced
- Waleed Bechara (Lebanon) – Advanced
- Tamer Daher (Lebanon) – Advanced
- Rula Azar (Palestine) – Eliminated
- Mohammed Ben Saleh (Tunisia) – Advanced

"Ma Dam Tuhibu" by Umm Kulthum

- Ghianna Ghantous (Palestine) – Eliminated

"Sawah" by Abdel Halim Hafez

- Shadi Dakwar (Palestine) – Advanced
- Muhannad Al Khatib (Jordan) – Eliminated
- Linda Zamil (Palestine) – Eliminated
- Manal Hadli (Algeria) – Eliminated

Improvisations

- Yacoub Shaheen (Palestine) – Advanced
- Muhannad Hussein (Jordan) – Advanced
- Hamza Essaoui (Morocco) – Eliminated

By the end of the individual challenge, and after the 24 competitors to advance was announced, the jury felt as though the previously eliminated candidate Rawan Aalyan deserved a second chance, and so, she was asked to come back, bringing the total number of semi-finalists to 25 (7 female and 18 male). These semi-finalists arise from 12 different Arab countries : 6 from Egypt, 6 from Palestine, 2 from Lebanon, 2 from Tunisia, 2 from Yemen, and 1 of each from Algeria, Bahrain, Iraq, Jordan, Morocco, Saudi Arabia and Syria. Each semi-finalist has their own voting number, varying from 1 to 25.

== Semi-finals ==
Voting No.	Contestant	Song Choice	Result
1	Israa Jamal	Ana Fi Intezarak – Umm Kulthum	Wild Card
2	Amir Dandan	Allah Ma'ak Ya Beit Samed Beljanoub – Wadih Alsaffi	Advanced
3	Badr Al Hassan	Ya Beadhum Kelohum – Abdelmajeed Abdulla	Eliminated
4	Bandar Mougri	Bent Alnour – Mohammed Abdu	Advanced
5	Tamer Daher	Ya Seif Aala Alaada Tayel – Marwan Mahfoudh	Wild Card
6	Houssam Al Shoueikhi	Targhali Ya Targhali – George Wassouf	Advanced
7	Hussein Mohammad	Ebaatly Gawab – Sabah Fakhri	Eliminated
8	Dalia Said	Lola Al Malama – Warda Al-Jazairia	Advanced
9	Rabii Zayyoud	Alloulou Almandood – Sabah Fakhri	Eliminated
10	Rawan Aalyan	Aadeit Nejmat Alsama – Mueen Sharif	Eliminated
11	Samar Al Husseini	Yama Alqamar Aal Bab – Fayza Ahmed	Eliminated
12	Shadi Dakwar	Aala Shat Bahr Alhawa – Karem Mahmoud	Wild Card
13	Abdallah Alkhelifi	Kelma Walaw Jabr Khater – Abadi AlJawhar	Eliminated
14	Ammar Mohammad	Waqif Aala Babakum – Naeema Sameeh	Advanced
15	Camelia Ward	Waayouni Sahara – Cheb Jilani	Wild Card
16	Kawthar Berrani	Ma Feeni Shi – Thekra	Advanced
17	Mohammad Ben Saleh	Ta'a Nensa – Melhem Barakat	Wild Card
18	Mohammad Said	Hawa Ya Hawa – Fadl Shaker	Eliminated
19	Mohammad Moustafa	Wala Ya Wala – Abdelghani AlSayed	Eliminated
20	Muhannad Hussein	Sarlak Youmein Ma Aajebni – Mohammad AbdelJaber	Wild Card
21	Nader Hammouda	Badi Shoufak Kol Youm – Wael Jassar	Eliminated
22	Nadine Khatib	Alaeei Zayek Fen Ya Ali – Sabah	Wild Card
23	Houmam Ibrahim	Hayra – Adel Akla	Advanced
24	Walid Bechara	Baktob Ismak Ya Baladi – Joseph Azar	Wild Card
25	Yacoub Shahin	Lahjar Qasrak – Sarya AlSawwas	Advanced

The 8 contestants who received the most votes automatically advanced to the next round. The judges were able to each select two of the remaining contestants as wild cards. Each pair would sing and then the judge would decide whom to save, advancing them to the next round.

=== Wild Card ===
Contestant	Song Choice	Selected by	Result
Israa Jamal	Mali Wana Mali – Warda Al-Jazairia	Nancy Ajram	Advanced
Nadine Khatib	Ya Sa'a Belwaqt Igri – Nour AlHoudda	Nancy Ajram	Advanced*
Mohammad Ben Saleh	Qaletli Kelma – Ali Al Riahi	Hassan El Shafei	Advanced
Shadi Dakwar	Toba Toba – Abdel Halim Hafez	Hassan El Shafei	Eliminated
Camelia Ward	Kan Ya Makan – Mayada El Hennawy	Ahlam	Eliminated
Muhannad Hussein	Ana Ya Tair – Fouad Salem	Ahlam	Advanced
Tamer Daher	Sawt Alheda – Assi El Helani	Wael Kfoury	Eliminated
Walid Bechara	Alazaab – Melhem Barakat	Wael Kfoury	Advanced

*After being initially eliminated, the judges unanimously decided to save Nadine Khatib and she became the 13th Finalist.

== Contestant Progress ==
Week		2	3	4	5	6	7	8	9
Date		6-7 Jan	13-14 Jan	20-21 Jan	27-28 Jan	3-4 Feb	10-11 Feb	17-18 Feb	24-25 Feb
1	Yacoub Shaheen								Winner
2	Amir Dandan								Runner-up
3	Ammar Mohammad								Third Place
4	Mohammad Ben Saleh								Eliminated
5	Muhannad Hussein			Bottom 3	Bottom 4			Eliminated	
6	Dalia Said			Bottom 3	Bottom 4		Eliminated		
7	Houmam Ibrahim		Bottom 4			Eliminated			
8	Walid Bechara		Bottom 4		Eliminated				
9	Kawthar Berrani				Eliminated				
10	Nadine Khatib			Eliminated					
11	Israa Jamal		Eliminated						
12	Bandar Mougri	Bottom 3	Eliminated						
13	Houssam Al Shoueikhi	Eliminated							

== Finals ==
On finale night, February 25, 2017 Yacoub Shaheen from Palestine was crowned the winner of the fourth season of Arab Idol in a tough competition against Ameer Dandan from Palestine and Ammar Mohammed from Yemen . For the first time of Arab Idol history 2 of the last 3 contestants were Palestinian.

The finale night also had two very touching moments. The first was during the performance of the Hussain al Jassmi song "Hobilaha" (My love for her) by finalist Ammar Mohammed of Yemen, who broke down uncontrollably halfway while singing, and judge Ahlam had to come onto stage to console him.

The second was shortly before the crowning ceremony, when the 13 finalists, led by Yacoub Shaheen, Ammar Mohammed, and Ameer Dandan, got together on stage to sing a special song, "Cursed are the wars". Judge Nancy Ajram was seen in tears near the end of the song.
