= Fahita =

Fahita may refer to:

- Fahita (East Timor)
- Abla Fahita, an Egyptian puppet character

== See also ==
- Fajita, in Tex-Mex cuisine, grilled meat usually served as a taco on a flour or corn tortilla
