= Mohammed Yaqoub (disambiguation) =

Mohammed Yaqoub may refer to:

- Mohammed Yacoub (ISN 01004), a captive held in extrajudicial detention, first in Bagram, then Guantanamo – see Afghan captives in Guantanamo
- Mohammed Yaqoub Akhounzada, a captive held in extrajudicial detention at Bagram Theater Internment Facility
- Muhammad Hussein Yacoub (born 1956), an Egyptian cleric
- Mohammed Yacoub Al Madadi, a former Quatari diplomat, fired after triggering a security alert aboard United Airlines Flight 663
