= Rikia Magha =

Moroccan singer and actress

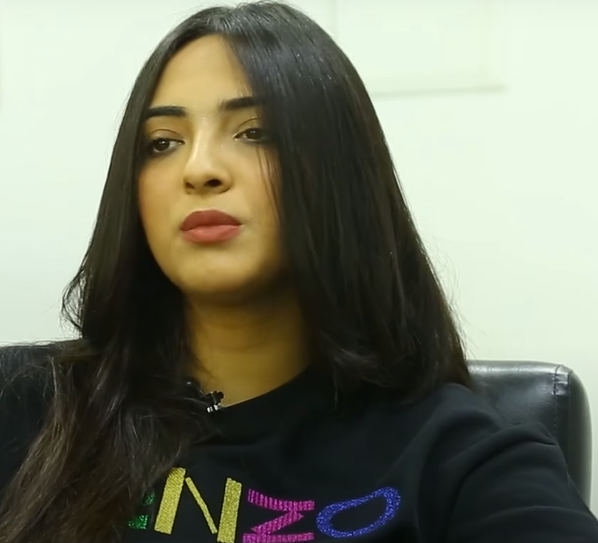
- Magha in 2020

Background information
- Born: 15 October 1993 (age 32); Safi
- Genres: Pop music
- Occupations: Musician, actress
- Years active: 2014–present

Rikia Magha (Arabic: رقية ماغى; born 15 October 1993 in Safi) is a Moroccan singer and actress.

== Career ==
In 2014, she took part in the third edition of the Arab Idol music competition.

In 2015, she revealed Mayhemmak in collaboration with Mahmoud Berhil and Mohamed Noubal, and began a tour in Arab countries.

In July 2019, on the occasion of the Throne Day, Rikia Magha released Lmaghreb W Jamalo, in the format of a music video directed by Noubal.

Coinciding with the 44th anniversary of the Green March, Rikia Magha released a work titled Hadi Sahrati, with rhythms blending modern music and desert tunes. In her second national song of the genre, Magha collaborated with Mohammed Al-Maghraby on the lyrical level, Mehdi Mozayine on the melodic level and Tariq Al-Hujaili for the casting.

In December 2021, Rikia Magha unveils her new single entitled Des Souvenirs, a Raï style title composed by Younes Adam and distributed by Zino Kandour.

== Discography ==
2015 : Mayhemmak

2016: Khayl Al Qasseed

2017 : Al Layl

2017 : Qadar Qadar

2017: Tleatili Min Ween

2017: Eddunya Doros feat. Fayssal Al Jassem

2018 : Rawaea Fezaa

2018: El Qessayed Enta

2018: Chher W Semana

2018: Tebghi Al Sedq

2019: Lmaghreb W Jamalo

2019: Hada Houa Lmaghrebi feat. Karima Gouit, Redone Berhil et Badr Soultan

2020: Hadi Saharti

2021: Kol Deqqat Qalb

2021: Des Souvenirs

== Filmography ==
2019: Hal Wayyana

2021 : Alaaeddine

2022 : Alfanar
