= Hani Mitwasi =

Jordanian singer (born 1983)

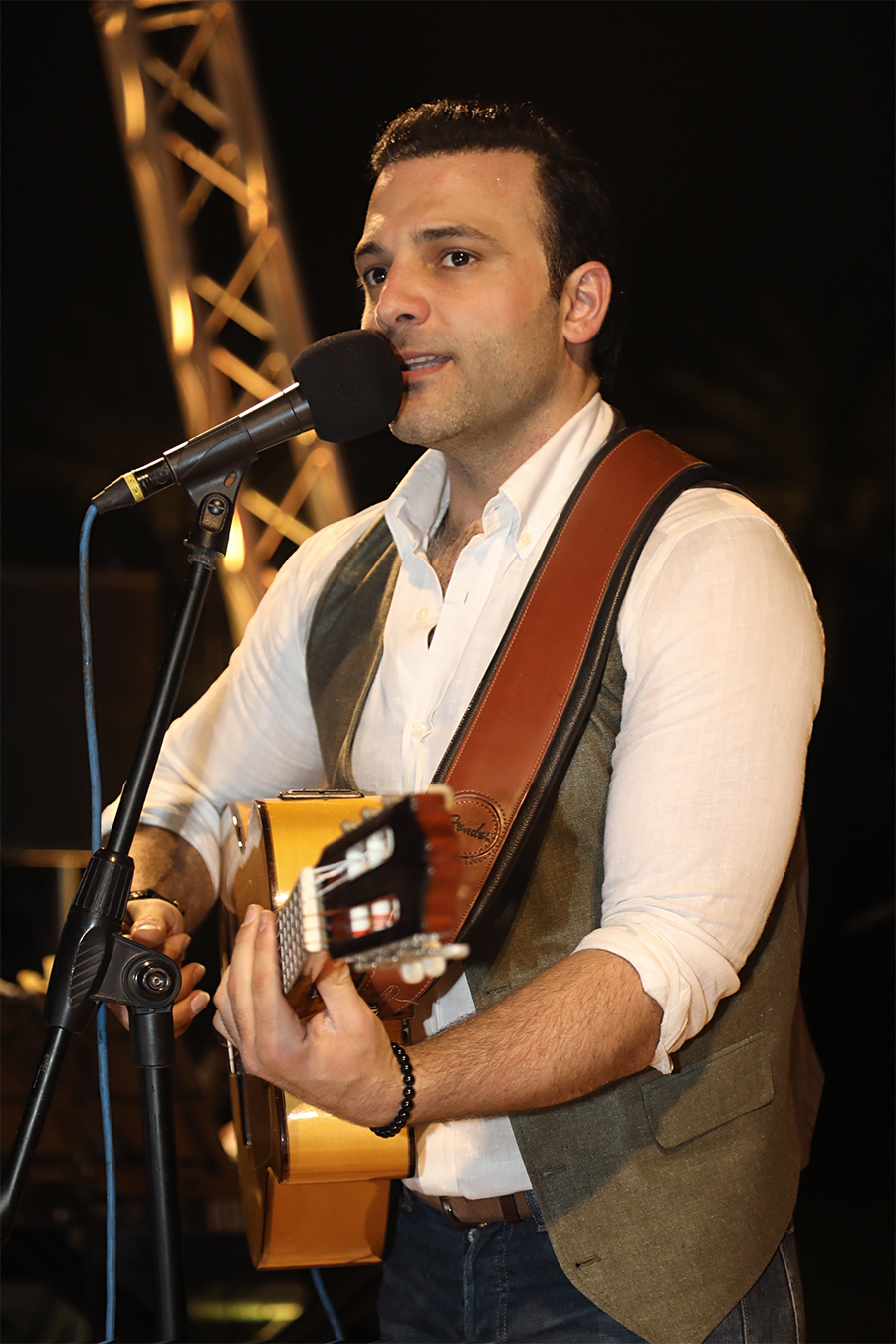

Hani Mitwasi (Arabic: هاني متواسي, born 1983 in Kuwait City) is a Palestinian singer-musician from Jordan who is famous for singing in the ‘Spanish-Levant' music genre. After several years of following his passion of Spanish and Flamenco music, he received his BA in music science at the Jordan Academy of Music in 2005, in addition to his 5 years of studying the flamenco guitar.

== Musical career ==
Mitwasi released his first album Khamrat Al Hob ("The Liquor of Love") in 2006, comprising remakes of six folklore Levant songs in the new ‘Spanish-Levant' line of music. Mitwasi went on to release his second album, Barmi El Salam ("Spreading my Salutation"), in 2007; it contained remakes of five Spanish-Levant songs and a single, "Barmi El Salam".

Following the success of the second album, Platinum Records contracted Mitwasi to produce a new album, Ozran Habibi ("Apologies my love"). This was one of the factors that led Mitwasi to win the Jordan Music Award for best Jordanian artist in 2010. This album was not based on the Spanish-Levant style, but on the modern style of Levant music.

Mitwasi is known for his live performances; in 2012; he reproduced and sang live "Mawtini" ("My homeland"), one of the most famous national songs in Arab history, where it inspired several regional artists to record it in a similar performance. In 2013, Mitwasi performed live along with Alberto Lopez and his band in a Flamenco Levant concert with an audience of 5,000. The concert was recorded and released in an album called Live Concert.

Mitwasi was appointed as one of the judges in the talent show Jordan Star in 2015 and 2017.

== Discography ==
- Khamrat Al Hob 2006
1. Khamrat Al Hob
2. Talaa men Bait Abooha
3. Ya Lour
4. Fog El Nakhal - Hali Hal
5. Ya Msaleeny
6. Ghazale
- Barmi El Ealam 2007
1. Sebooni ya Nas
2. Telet ya Mahla Norha
3. Ya Reem
4. Awal Eshret Mahbooby
5. Ya Tair ya Tayer
6. Barmi El Salam
- Ozraa Habibi 2010
1. Wenak Habibi
2. Sebooni ya Nas
3. Lawn El Bahr
4. Enhebek
5. Ahwaly Matsoresh
6. Jay Ala Bali
7. Men Be'ed
8. Albi Ablak Tah
9. Ozraa Habibi
- Live Concert 2014
1. Hali Hal
2. Khamrat Al Hob
3. Sahar El Layali
4. Lela Ya Samra
5. Seboni Ya Nas
6. Ya Lour
7. Ya Reem
8. Ya Mohra
9. Dalona
10. Slema
11. Sabri Alek Tal
12. Awel Marra
13. Ensa Gharamak
- Singles
1. Wala Ala Baly
2. Ya Mohra
3. Mawtini
4. Haqiq Helem ( World Cup )
5. Ouli El kelme
6. Majnoon Bhobbak
7. Esmy Elazzabi
8. Al Rajol Al Aly
9. Champions Anthem
10. Jerusale Speaks
11. Wala Omrek Tensi
12. Rouh El Rouh
13. Shu Btestany
14. The Path of Legends
