= Yacob =

Yacob, Yakob or Yaqob is a masculine given name associated with Jacob, a surname and a patronymic. Bearers of the name include:

== Given name ==
- Yaqob I, legendary primate of the Church of the East
- Yaqob II (699–?), Patriarch of the Church of the East from 753 to 773
- Yaqob of India, 14th century metropolitan bishop of the St Thomas Christians of Malabar
- Yaqob Abuna (died 1553), Metropolitan of the Church of Malabar of the Saint Thomas Christians
- Yaqob of Ethiopia (c. 1590–1607), Emperor of Ethiopia
- Yaqob Beyene (1936–2025), Ethiopian translator and academic
- Yakob Debesay (born 1999), Eritrean former road cyclist
- Yakob Elias (born 1953), Metropolitan of the Brahmavar Diocese of Malankara Orthodox Syrian Church
- Yacob Haile-Mariam (born 1944), Ethiopian retired law professor, politician and former prisoner of conscience
- Yakob Hashim (born 1960), Singaporean former football goalkeeper
- Yacob Jarso (born 1988), Ethiopian long-distance runner and former steeplechaser
- Yakob Mar Irenaios (born 1949), Metropolitan of the Kochi Diocese of the Malankara Orthodox Syrian Church
- Yacob Mulugetta, British-African professor of energy and development policy
- Yakob Sayuri (born 1997), Indonesian footballer

== Surname ==
- Abune Yacob (1924–2003), second patriarch of the Eritrean Orthodox Tewahdo Church
- Claudio Yacob (born 1987), Argentine former footballer
- Elsa Yacob (born 1961), Eritrean painter
- Kevin Yakob (born 2000), Swedish footballer
- Mohammad Yacob, 21st century Filipino politician
- Zera Yacob (philosopher) (1600–1693), Ethiopian philosopher

== Patronymic ==
- Ahmad Yakob (born 1950), Malaysian politician
- Halimah Yacob (born 1954), Singaporean politician and lawyer, 8th president of Singapore and first woman to hold the office
- Yusof Yacob (born 1955), Malaysian 20th-21st century politician

== See also ==
- Yakub, a given name and surname
- Zara Yaqob (1399–1468), Emperor of Ethiopia
- Zera Yacob Amha Selassie (born 1953), grandson of Emperor Haile Selassie and head of the Imperial House of Ethiopia
