= Arab Idol season 3 =

Arab Idol
- Season 3

Release
- Original network: MBC 1
- Original release: 5 September – 13 December 2014

Season chronology
- ← Previous; Season 2 Next → Season 4

The third season of Arab Idol premiered on 5 September 2014. Auditions were held in Beirut, Bahrain, Kuwait, Algeria, Cairo, Alexandria, Dubai, Morocco, Palestine, Iraq and on the European continent, notably in Paris and Berlin. The airline Emirates was a major sponsor of season 3. The winner of the season was Hazem Shareef from Syria.

== Auditions ==
MBC1 announced on the venues where auditions for Arab Idol would be held, and many cities were added very notably Ramallah in areas of the Palestinian Authority. Arab diaspora applicants were better serviced with addition to could apply like Paris, France and Berlin, Germany.

Venues for auditions were:

- 26 February 2014: Casablanca, Morocco
- 2 March 2014: Paris, France
- 5 March 2014: Berlin, Germany
- 7 March 2014: Tlemcen, Algeria
- 9 March 2014: Alexandria, Egypt
- 13 March 2014: Cairo, Egypt
- 17 March 2014: Ramallah, Palestinian Authority
- 17 March 2014: Kuwait City, Kuwait
- 20 March 2014: Manama, Bahrain
- 22 March 2014: Dubai, United Arab Emirates
- 25 March 2014: Erbil, Iraq
- 30 March 2014: Beirut, Lebanon

== Judges ==
Three of the four judges from season 2 returned with Ragheb Alama being replaced, after two consecutive seasons, by another well-known Lebanese singer, Wael Kfoury, who was recently a judge on the pan-Arabian version of The X Factor. The judging panel comprised:

- Wael Kfoury - Singer and composer
- Ahlam - Singer and composer
- Hassan El Shafei - Music producer, record producer and vocalist
- Nancy Ajram - Singer

== Contestants ==
Eighty candidates were chosen from all venues to be auditioned in Beirut. They were divided into 14 groups, each presenting a group presentation of various genres like Egyptian, Iraqi, Syrian, Lebanese, Khaleeji etc. In episodes 5 and 6, a total of 26 finalists were chosen from the initial group presentations to go to the live rounds.

Season 3 was also notable because of the presence of non-Arabic-speaking contestants at the auditions. Some examples included Nao Koyasu, a Japanese lady who auditioned in Dubai; and sisters Karishma and Prateeka Hemanathan, both from south India, who auditioned in Bahrain, among others. Of these, only Koyasu made it through to the next round, the group challenge, though she did not make it any further.

Male contestants chosen were:

- From Algeria: Mounir Bedouhan (28), Agrad Yagurta (22)
- From Egypt: Mohammad Hassan (30), Mohammad Saeed (26), Yasser Ali (23), Mu'men Khalil (19), Mohammed Rashad (26)
- From Iraq: Ali Najm (20), Ammar al Koufi (23)
- From Lebanon: Georges Najm (29)
- From Morocco: Issam al Mouzni (22)
- From Palestine: Haitham Khalaylee (24), Ahmad Kharroub (34)
- From Saudi Arabia: Abdelaziz al Shareef (22), Majed al Madani (26)
- From Syria: Hazem Shareef (21 years)
- From Tunisia: Ameen Bourguiba (21)
- From United Arab Emirates: Hameed al Abdouli (23)
- From Yemen: Waleed al Jilani (29)

Female contestants chosen were:

- From Egypt: Hiballah Youssef (28), Mirvat Wajdi (18), Salma Ahmad (18), Inath Ezzeddin (27), Iman Abdelaziz (26)
- From Morocco: Sahar Marbouha (20)
- From Palestine: Manal Moussa (25)
- From Syria: Sahar Bou Sharrouf (27)

This way, in the final 26, eleven Arab countries were represented, with Egypt getting 10 nominated candidates of the total 26 contestants.

== Final ranking ==
On finale night, December 13, 2014, Hazem Shareef from Syria was crowned the winner of the third season of Arab Idol in a tough competition against Haitham Khalaily from Palestine and Majed Madani from Saudi Arabia.

1. Hazem Shareef, Syria - Title winner
2. Haitham Khalayla, Palestine - Runner-up
3. Majed al Madani, Saudi Arabia - Second runner-up
4. Mohammad Rashad, Egypt
5. Ammar al Koufi, Iraq
6. Waleed al Jilani, Yemen
7. Manal Moussa, Palestine
8. Inas Ezzeddin, Egypt
9. Mohammad Hassan, Egypt
10. Ajrad Yaghourta, Algeria
11. Sahar Abou Sharouf, Syria
12. Hameed al Abdouli, United Arab Emirates
13. Mu'min Khalil, Egypt
