= Arab Idol =

Television series

- Genre: Reality television
- Created by: Simon Fuller
- Presented by: Annabella Hilal (1-3); Abdallah El Tulehi (1); Ahmed Fahmi (2-4)
- Judges: Ragheb Alama (1–2); Ahlam (1–4); Hassan El Shafei (1–4); Nancy Ajram (2–4); Wael Kfoury (3–4)
- Original language: Arabic
- No. of seasons: 5

Production
- Producer: Arab world
- Production locations: Beirut, Lebanon
- Running time: Varies

Original release
- Network: MBC 1
- Release: 9 December 2011 – 25 February 2017

Arab Idol is an Arabic television show, based on the British show Pop Idol, which was created by Simon Fuller's 19 Entertainment and developed by Fremantle Media. It was recorded in Beirut, Lebanon. The first season premiered on 9 December 2011. The show was broadcast worldwide on MBC 1 and simultaneously aired on LBC. The second season debuted on 8 March 2013, the third season on 5 September 2014, and the fourth season on 4 November 2016 on MBC.

== Background ==
Arab Idol is the successor to a previous pan-Arab rendition of the Idol series called SuperStar, which aired on the Lebanese Future TV for 10 seasons, beginning in 2003. MBC 1 expressed the desire to revive the show in a revamped version. The concept is still the same: ten young contestants from all over the Arab world are selected after many auditions, and perform songs on stage in front of a live audience and the judges on the main weekly show every Friday. Then there is a 24-hour time period during which the viewers can vote for their favourites by SMS. The contestant who receives the fewest votes is eliminated during the following show. This elimination process continues weekly, until a winner is crowned on the show's finale. The winner receives various prizes, including but not limited to a recording contract with Platinum Records (recording label affiliated with MBC) for a debut album, and a Chevrolet Corvette. The show was unveiled to the public on 21 July 2011 when MBC 1 began airing the first advertisement. The name was changed from Super Star to Arab Idol and a new logo was launched.

== Summary ==
Season	From	To	Winner	Runner-up	Host(s)	Judges			
Season	From	To	Winner	Runner-up	Host(s)	1	2	3	4
1	9 December 2011	23 March 2012	Carmen Suleiman	Dounia Batma	Annabella Hilal; Abdallah Tulehi	Ragheb Alama	Ahlam	Hassan El Shafei	N/A
2	8 March 2013	22 June 2013	Mohammed Assaf	Ahmad Gamal	Annabella Hilal; Ahmad Fahmi	Ragheb Alama	Ahlam	Hassan El Shafei	Nancy Ajram
3	5 September 2014	13 December 2014	Hazem Shareef	Haitham Khalayla	Annabella Hilal; Ahmad Fahmi	Wael Kfoury	Ahlam	Hassan El Shafei	Nancy Ajram
4	4 November 2016	25 February 2017	Yacoub Shaheen	Amir Dandan	Ahmad Fahmi	Wael Kfoury	Ahlam	Hassan El Shafei	Nancy Ajram

== Season 1 (2011–2012) ==
The first season was hosted by Kuwaiti actor Abdallah Tulehi and Lebanese model Annabella Hilal. The judging panel consisted of

- Ragheb Alama - Singer and composer
- Ahlam - Singer and composer
- Hassan El Shafei - Music producer, record producer and vocalist

On finale night, 24 March 2012, Carmen Suleiman from Egypt was crowned the winner of the first season of Arab Idol in a tough competition against Dounia Batma from Morocco.

== Season 2 (2013) ==
The second season was hosted by Egyptian singer and actor Ahmed Fahmi and Lebanese model Annabella Hilal. The judging panel consisted of:

- Ragheb Alama - Singer and composer
- Ahlam - Singer and composer
- Hassan El Shafei - Music producer, record producer and vocalist
- Nancy Ajram - Singer

The second season premiered on 8 March 2013.

On finale night, 22 June 2013, Mohammed Assaf from Palestine was crowned the winner of the second season of Arab Idol in a tough competition against Farah Youssef from Syria and Ahmad Gamal from Egypt.

== Season 3 (2014) ==
The third season premiered on 5 September 2014. Auditions were held in Lebanon, Bahrain, Kuwait, Algeria, Cairo, Alexandria, Dubai, Morocco, Palestine, Iraq, and on the European continent, notably in Paris and Berlin. The airline Emirates was a major sponsor of season 3.

Three of the four judges returned with Ragheb Alama being replaced, after two consecutive seasons, by another well-known Lebanese singer, Wael Kfoury, who was recently a judge on the pan-Arabian version of The X Factor. The judging panel comprised:

- Wael Kfoury - Singer and composer
- Ahlam - Singer and composer
- Hassan El Shafei - Music producer, record producer and vocalist
- Nancy Ajram - Singer

Season 3 was notable because of the presence of non-Arabic-speaking contestants at the auditions including a Japanese and two Indian contestants. The Japanese Koyasu made it through to the group challenge, though she did not proceed any further and was eliminated before the Final 26.

On finale night, 13 December 2014, Hazem Shareef from Syria was crowned the winner of the third season of Arab Idol in a tough competition against Haitham Khalaily from Palestine and Majed Madani from Saudi Arabia.

== Season 4 (2016–2017) ==
The fourth season premiered on November 4, 2016. Auditions were held in Beirut, Bahrain, Kuwait, Algeria, Cairo, Alexandria, Dubai, Morocco, Palestine, Iraq and Turkey.

The judging panel comprises:

- Wael Kfoury - Singer and composer
- Ahlam - Singer and composer
- Hassan El Shafei - Music producer, record producer and vocalist
- Nancy Ajram - Singer

On finale night, 25 February 2017, Yacoub Shaheen from Palestine was crowned the winner of the fourth season of Arab Idol in a tough competition against Ameer Dandan also from Palestine and Ammar Mohammed from Yemen. For the first time in Arab Idol history, two of the last three contestants were Palestinian.
