= Abla Fahita =

Egyptian satirical puppet character

The older version of Abla Fahita

Abla Fahita (Arabic: أبلة فاهيتا IPA: [ˈʔɑblɑ fæˈhiːtæ]; "abla" means "teacher" and "fahita" comes from fajita) is an Egyptian satirical puppet character. The character was introduced online in 2010. She featured in Al Bernameg with Bassem Youssef, and has started a show in 2014 Abla Fahita Live from the Duplex on CBC channel. The infamous widow with her sharp tongue and acid humour and an obvious defiance for taboos has gained her both lovers and haters. Being a puppet loved by children yet hosting a show for adults has been her controversy. The highest paid female presenter in the Middle East. However, she also meets with celebrities as they arrive for the Dubai International Film Festival. Erin Cunningham of The Washington Post compared Abla Fahita to a Muppet. Dalia Kholaif of Al Jazeera wrote that Abla Fahita "gained popularity for its off-beat expressions in mocking developments in Egypt". The character has a daughter, Caro (Carcoura) who she treats in a tough way to roughen her up for a rough world. Her son is Boudi, her favorite and most cherished.

The Netflix original Drama Queen was released on March 15, 2021.

== Vodafone advert controversy ==
In December 2013, Abla Fahita had appeared on a Vodafone Egypt advert. In this advert she is looking for the SIM card of her deceased husband. Vodafone, a British company, is Egypt's largest mobile service provider.

A youth regime apologist in Egypt accused the advertisement of being a coded message for a planned attack on a shopping complex. The Egyptian prosecutor general asked the state prosecution service to carry out an investigation into the character. The conspiracy theorist, Ahmed Zebidar or Ahmed Spider, filed a complaint against Vodafone Egypt and stated his intention to have the character imprisoned. The accuser, Ahmed Spider, was supporter of Hosni Mubarak. The puppet was accused of being a British agent, and the accusations stated that the advert had Muslim Brotherhood messages. Egyptian government officials questioned Vodafone executives, and an article in Slate stated that the government had "reportedly" asked those executives to report to court in the near future.

A Twitter stream named #FreeFahita advocated in favor of the character. In January 2014 Abla Fahita and her accuser, Spider, were interviewed on a live primetime TV show on Capital Broadcast Center (CBC) via skype and over the phone, respectively. Abla Fahita denied that there were coded messages in the advert. The Economist wrote that "By and large, Egyptians have poured scorn and ridicule on all this silly talk." and news.com.au wrote that "The official investigation into the puppet has been widely mocked." Cunningham wrote that "The investigation of the puppet is an extreme sign of a climate of fear and paranoia in Egypt that has intensified in recent weeks."

== Abla Fahita singing and acting ==
In 2014, Abla Fahita cooperated with the famous Egyptian composer and Arab Idol judge Hassan El Shafei in a song named "Mayestahloushi" ("they are not worthy") which hit more than a million and a half views in less than a week (considered a lot at that time).

In October 2020, Netflix finished the production phase of Abla Fahita's Drama Queen series, which released on March 15, 2021.

Abla Fahita: Drama Queen consists of 6 episodes full of an action-packed comedy-drama, which is considered as Abla Fahita’s first foyer into the drama world and also highlights her human side. The illustrious diva goes on the run after being implicated in a crime.

The series is directed by Khaled Marei and written by Abla Fahita with the participation of Mohamed El-Gamal, George Azmy, Dina Maher, and Mahmoud Ezzat, and produced by OKWRD Productions in cooperation with Partner Pro and the executive producers, Amin Al-Masri & Rania Hegazy.

In April 2021, Abla Fahita collaborated with Adidas MENA on their new Stan Smith, Forever green campaign.

== Abla Fahita: Drama Queen ==
=== Season 1 (2021) ===
No.	Title	Original release date
1	"Work Kebab"	March 15, 2021
It's the anticipated opening night and Abla Fahita is starring, but a slip soon dethrones the diva, forcing her to pursue an unglamorous route.
2	"Farewell Bonaparte"	March 15, 2021
In haste to flee the scene, Abla loses her kids. With Caro and Boudi stuck in the nightclub, Abla joins forces with an unexpected ally.
3	"The Nono Ripens"	March 15, 2021
Determined to hunt for evidence, a disguised Abla returns to the scene while Caro, the nightclub's newest employee, finds her voice.
4	"Gucci Double Semelle"	March 15, 2021
To unlock the next clues, Abla and Samah embark on a morbid mission. After becoming a viral sensation, Caro is faced with some tough decisions.
5	"Hexadactyly"	March 15, 2021
In a further attempt to prove her innocence, Abla sets Amin up for an icy confession, while Caro navigates her stardom and seeks comfort from Ashwak.
6	"Fangs without a Serpent"	March 15, 2021
For the grand showdown, Abla coaches Caro to take the lead. Emotions run high as their risky plan unfolds and danger looms.
