= Annabella Hilal =

Lebanese model and TV presenter

Annabella Hilal أنابيلا هلال
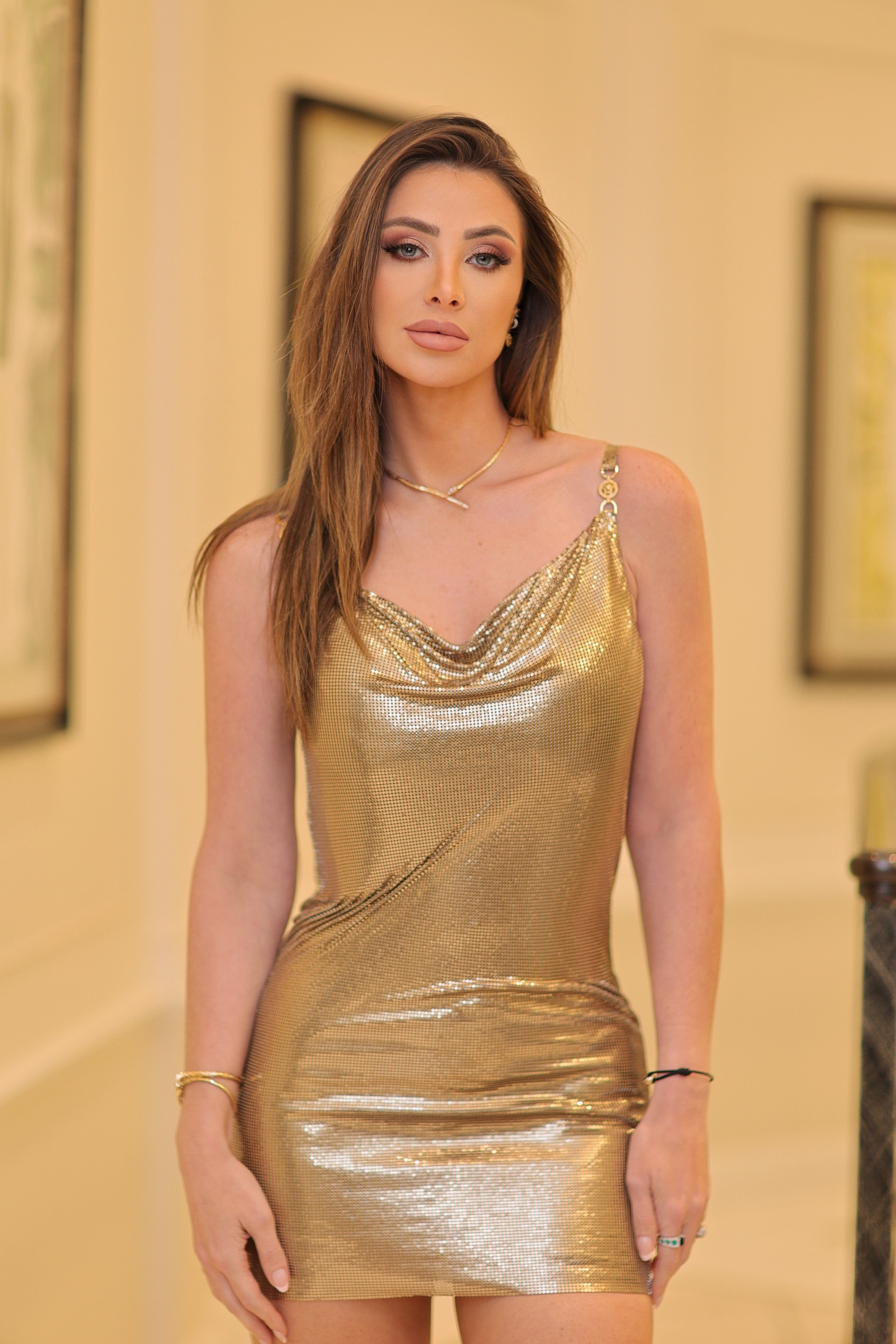
- Hilal in 2025
- Born: Beirut, Lebanon
- Occupations: Television presenter Model
- Notable credit: Arab Idol (MBC 1)
- Beauty pageant titleholder
- Title: Miss World Lebanon 2006
- Years active: 2007–present
- Major competitions: Miss Lebanon 2006 (1st Runner-up); Miss World 2006 (Top 17)

Annabella Samir Hilal (born in Achrafieh, Beirut) is a Lebanese TV host, model and beauty pageant titleholder who appointed as Miss World Lebanon 2006 after placed 1st Runner-up and then represented her country at Miss World 2006 in Poland where she placed Top 17.

== Biography ==
Hilal was born in 1983 into an Orthodox Christian family in Beirut. She is fluent in English and French in addition to her native Arabic. Hilal studied at the Collège des Pères Antonins of Baabda, graduating in 2004 with a Master's in Law. Her ambition is to become a judge.

She represented Lebanon in Miss World 2006 and was ranked among the top seven pageants of the world

The world of television offered to her several opportunities where she worked as an anchor and TV presenter on LBC for the programs Mission Fashion and Helwe w Murra. Annabella believes in the quote that says: “After each storm the sun will smile”, therefore she considers that her ultimate success in the world of TV and media was after being selected to join the MBC team and to present the live music talent show Arab Idol alongside Ahmed Fahmi.

On November 14, 2009, Hilal married Nader Saab, a Lebanese plastic surgeon, in a Christian ceremony in Cyprus. She gave birth to their first child, a daughter named Mayeva, on August 21, 2010.

Hilal is also very active on social media, where she has amassed 7.3 million followers on her official Instagram account.
