= Mohamed El Shaer =

Mohamed Osama El Shaer
- محمد الشاعر
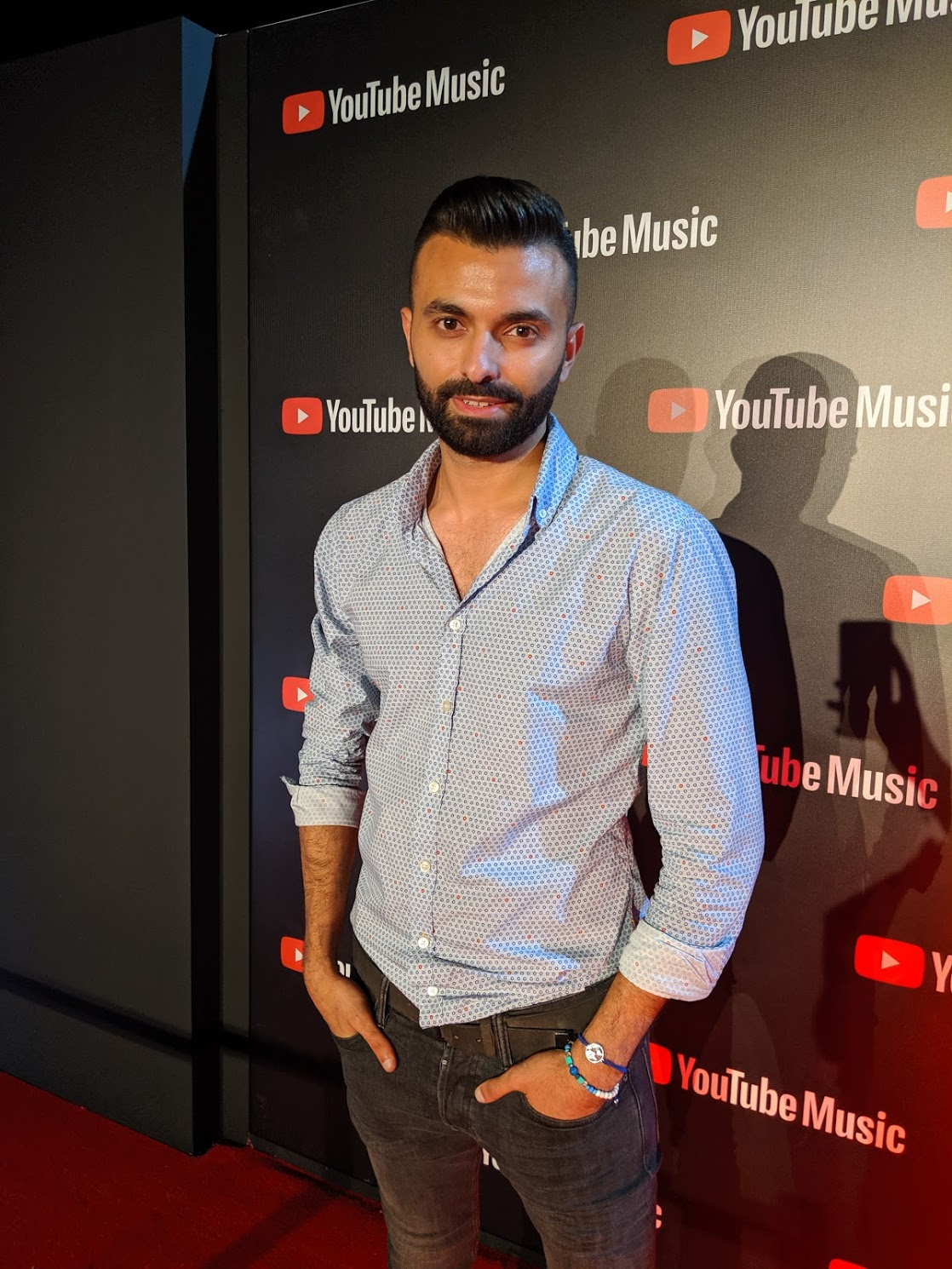
- Born: September 3, 1986 (age 39); Cairo, Egypt
- Website: eg.linkedin.com/in/mohamed-el-shaer-59b22746

Mohamed Osama El Shaer (Arabic: محمد الشاعر; born September 3, 1986) is an Egyptian artist, record producer, entrepreneur and media personality. El Shaer was distinguished by his modern style in choosing music. He also cooperated with important names in the music world from all the Arab countries including his partner Hassan El-Shafei, Sherine Abdelwahab, Mohamed Hamaki, Tamer Ashour, Carmen Soliman, Hamza Namira, Cairokee and others. He was known in Egypt for being a music producer and managing partner of “The Basement Records” that was founded by him and MEMA award-winning artist Hassan El-Shafei as well as the marketing manager for the worldwide Campaign “Tour’n Cure” for treatment of Hepatitis C that featured global ambassadors including football superstars Leo Messi and Dani Alves.

Mohamed El Shaer was chosen in 2024 by Billboard (magazine) Arabia 40 Under 40 list in the music industry.
