= Yacoub Shaheen =

Palestinian Assyrian singer (b. 1994)

Yacoub Shaheen يعقوب شاهين
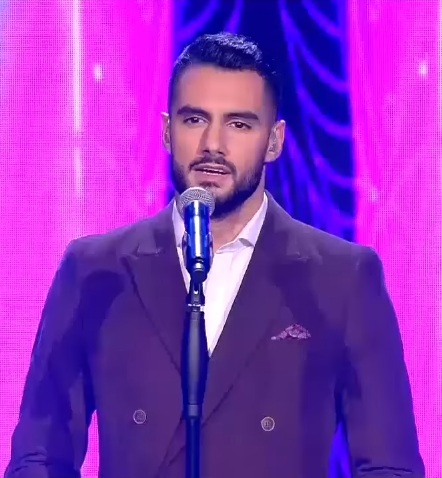
- Shaheen performing on Arab Idol, December 2016

Background information
- Born: February 27, 1994 (age 32); Bethlehem, Palestine
- Genres: Arabic music
- Instruments: Bozouk; Clarinet
- Years active: 2005–present

Yacoub Shaheen (Arabic: يعقوب شاهين; born 27 February 1994) is a Palestinian musician and singer. Born in Bethlehem, Shaheen grew up surrounded by music from an early age, and engaged in musical lessons during his youth. His early experiences in musical education would inspire him to pursue a career as a singer, performing at various festivals and winning competitions.

Shaheen is most well known for participating in the fourth season of Arab Idol, winning the contest in early 2017. His win catapulted him to popularity in his native Palestine, as well as among the Assyrian community in Bethlehem to which he belonged. He has since continued his career as a musician and singer.

== Early life ==
Shaheen was born to an Assyrian Christian family on 27 February, 1994 in the city of Bethlehem; his parents were refugees from Jerusalem, and his father worked as a carpenter. He would spend his childhood in Bethlehem and began to develop a passion for music after discovering Arabic and Assyrian folk-pop music, and he enrolled in the Edward Said National Conservatory of Music. He would learn several musical instruments, including the bozouki and clarinet, while he also developed his skills by participating in school and church choirs. Shaheen also studied interior design at the Palestine Polytechnic University, before eventually pursuing music full time.

== Career ==
In 2005, at age 11, Shaheen participated in the Palestinian Muhawm program where he would win the title of "Star of Palestine". 7 years later, he would win first place in the Palestinian Talent Program, and the following year, he released his first song, "Human Spirit", composed by lyricist Elias Gres alongside himself; the song was recorded at RJ Productions in Bethlehem.

In 2017, Shaheen won the TV program Arab Idol, becoming the second Palestinian to do so after Mohammed Assaf in 2013. He had almost dropped the competition altogether due to a cold. His win was attributed to his singing abilities and his mastery of the Arabic mawwal allowing him to rise very early into the competition, with judge Nancy Ajram noting that he was "charming, magical, and enchanting". During his performance, hundreds of citizens of Bethlehem, including the mayor Vera Baboun as well as Palestinian president Mahmoud Abbas gathered to watch the program live. Fans also set up a PayPal account to raise money for Shaheen, gathering $35,000 to help him win the contest. Many Palestinians celebrated the occasion of Shaheen's win by waving the Palestinian flag and emblems of the Syriac Orthodox Church, as well as playing some of the songs that he performed. Local youth tagged the sides of buildings with graffiti reading "Suryoyo" (Assyrian). His win triggered excitement among Assyrian communities in northern Iraq and the diaspora.

After Shaheen's win on Arab Idol, he was accompanied by the Awtar Band led by The Maestro Yacoub Al-Atrash in some Arab and international festivals. In 2021, he released a song in the Gulf Arabic dialect. Shaheen made his acting debut in the Lebanese film A Big Lie in 2023.

== Personal life ==
Shaheen grew up attending the Syriac Orthodox Church, and was a deacon at his local parish. In one of the Arab Idol episodes, he wrote a message that read "Seyfo 1915" to raise awareness of the Assyrian genocide, of which his grandparents were victims. He is also a member of the Palestine Scout Association and the Syriac Orthodox Scout Club in Bethlehem, and is a fluent speaker of Turoyo.

According to Dutch university teacher Heleen Murre-van den Berg, Shaheen adheres to an Aramean identity. Verbal fights in the diaspora over Assyrian and Aramean nomenclatures resulted in Shaheen's identification with the Palestinian cause passed over, to the point where stories posited he was pressured into hiding his identity on television.

Shaheen has regularly participated in philanthropic activities, including visits and donations to orphanages. After his win on Arab Idol, he visited Palestinian refugee camps in Lebanon, declaring solidarity for Palestinians everywhere. In 2018, Shaheen participated in the 6th annual Palestine Marathon. He also owns a fashion store in his native Bethlehem, and has two sisters. His father passed away in 2022. He became married in July 2023.
