= Sidi Yacoub =

Sidi Yacoub may refer to:

- Sidi Yacoub, Algeria
- Sidi Yacoub, Morocco
- Sidi Yacoub (footballer), Mauritanian footballer
