= Mohammed Assaf =

Libyan–born Palestinian pop singer (born 1989)

- محمد عساف
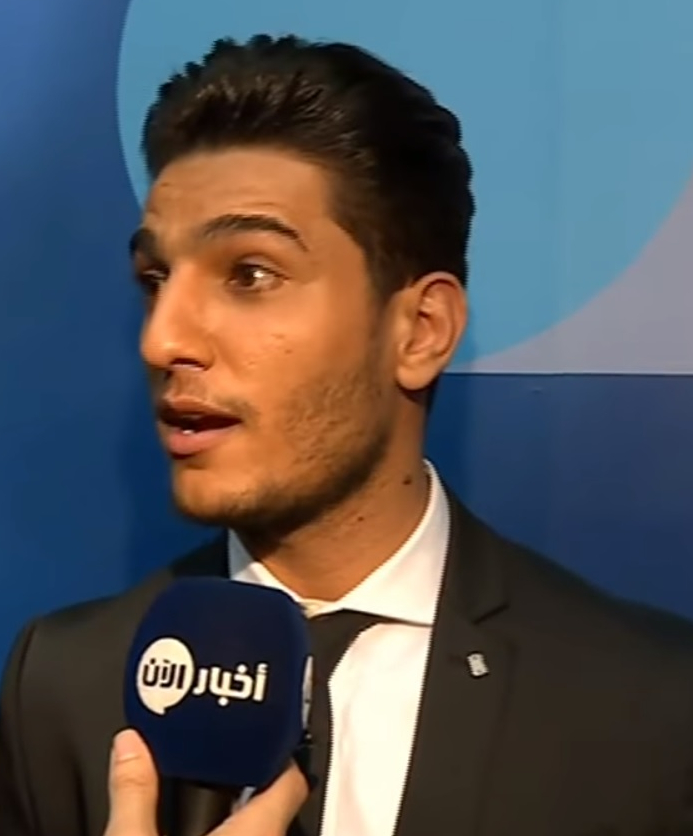
- Assaf in 2012
- Born: Mohammed Jaber Abdul Rahman Assaf محمد جبر عبدالرحمن عساف; 1 September 1989 (age 37); Misrata, Libya
- Occupation: Singer
- Years active: 2008–present
- Known for: Winner of the Arab Idol
- Spouse: Reem Ouda (m. 2020)
- Musical career
- Genres: Arabic; Arabic pop; Palestinian; Mawwal
- Instruments: Oud; Percussion instruments
- Label: Platinum Records Music
- Website: mohammedassaf442.com

Mohammed Jaber Abdul Rahman Assaf (Arabic: محمد جبر عبدالرحمن عساف; born 1 September 1989) is a Palestinian pop singer well known for being the winner of the second season of Arab Idol, broadcast by the MBC network. His victory received worldwide coverage from the media and was welcomed with joy by the Arab world. In 2013, Assaf was named a goodwill ambassador for peace by The United Nations Relief and Works Agency for Palestine Refugees (UNRWA). He was also named ambassador of culture and arts by the Palestinian government and was offered a position with "diplomatic standing" by Palestinian President Mahmoud Abbas. Assaf's story is the basis of the 2015 film The Idol, directed by Hany Abu-Assad. After Arab Idol, Assaf has gone on to enjoy huge popularity in the Arab World and the Arab diaspora and has released two albums and a great number of singles and collaborations. Most of his music is sung in the Iraqi and Gulf dialects, his most famous song is "Ana Dammi Falastini" which means "my blood is Palestinian" and is a cover of a traditional Palestinian song.

== Life ==
Assaf was born in Misrata, Libya, to Palestinian parents. The family of his mother Intisar, a mathematics teacher, hailed from the village of Bayt Daras and his father's family was from Beersheba, both of which areas were seized and depopulated by the nascent IDF in 1948. He has five siblings. The family lived in Misrata until Assaf was four years old. Then they moved to the Khan Yunis Refugee Camp in Gaza, where he grew up and attended an UNRWA elementary school.

Two of Assaf's siblings have also been involved in performing live music. Their mother stated that Assaf began singing at the age of five and "had a voice of someone who was much, much older." Before his role on the television show he was attending Gaza City's Palestine University majoring in media and public relations. Assaf did not have professional training as a singer; he started his career singing at weddings and other private events. He entered the public view in 2000 during a popular local television program where he called in and sang a nationalist song to the host's praise. Afterward, he was frequently offered contracts with local record companies. Sometime after his first performance, he sang in a local event in Gaza attended by then Palestinian president Yasser Arafat.

== Arab Idol ==
Mohammed Assaf travelled from Gaza Strip to Egypt to audition for Arab Idol. It took him two days to reach Egypt by car due to complications on the border. At the beginning, he had to convince the Egyptian security at the border crossing, where he was stuck for two days, to leave Gaza. Once he reached the hotel where the auditions were taking place, the doors were closed in which they did not accept anymore auditions so he jumped over the wall. After he jumped over the wall, he couldn't get a number to audition; he sat hopelessly in the hall where other contestants were waiting for their turn. He started singing to the contestants, and a Palestinian contestant, Ramadan Abu Nahel, who was waiting to audition heard him and gave him his number saying, "I know I won't reach the finals but you will."

He was given the nickname Asaroukh ("The Rocket") by Lebanese singer and Arab Idol judge Ragheb Alama. Assaf was acclaimed by the jury and the public. His voice and appearance have drawn comparisons to Egyptian singer Abdel Halim Hafez, which has garnered Assaf both fame and controversy. Fans merged part of Hafez's name with Assaf's, as in Assaf Hilm Falastine ("Assaf Palestine’s Dream"). Assaf's final performance was his own song that was well known before his rise to fame, "Ali al-kuffiyeh" ("Raise The Kuffiyeh"), a Palestinian song that called on Palestinians to raise their kuffiyehs (a traditional Arab headdress that has become a Palestinian nationalist symbol) and to unite, in light of the split between the two major Palestinian factions, Hamas and Fatah. Hundreds of thousands of Palestinians had tuned in to watch his performance. On 22 June, Assaf was declared the winner of Arab Idol, winning the most votes and coming ahead of two other competitors, Ahmed Gamal and Farah Youssef, from Egypt and Syria, respectively. Massive celebrations by Palestinians ensued after the announcement of his victory, including festivities held on the streets of Gaza City, East Jerusalem, Nablus, Ramallah, Bethlehem, Khan Yunis, Nazareth, Lebanon and Jordan, And when his professional career as an artist began after the title of Arab Idol, he was accompanied by Awtar Band led by The Maestro Yacoub Al-Atrash in Arab and international festivals since then.

=== Performances in Arab Idol ===
Performances during the auditions

- Casting (Cairo): "Safini Mara" by Abdel Halim Hafez
- Casting Beirut (Group audition) : "Ana Elli Alayki Mishtaq" by Joseph Sakr
- Casting Beirut:" Ala Babi Waef Amarin" by Melhem Barakat

Performances during the primes

- Top 27: Ya Sghiri – Melhem Zein
- 1st Prime: Aala Hisb Oudad – Abdel Halim Hafez
- 2nd Prime: Ya Reit – Ragheb Alama
- 3rd Prime: Gatalouni Oyoun Essoud – Wadih El Safi
- 4th Prime: El Zina Labsat Khalkhalaha – Samir Yazbek
- 5th Prime: Aanabi – Karem Mahmoud
- 6th Prime: Wa Baad Kentom – Mohammed Abdu
- 7th Prime: Sawt El Heda – Assi El Helani
- 8th Prime: Kol Da Kan Leih – Mohammed Abdel Wahab and Nemshi wa Nemshi – Saber Rebaï
- Final: Ya Ain Ala Saber – Wadih El Safi and Lena Allah – Mohammed Abdu and "Aali El Kuffiyeh" – Mohammed Assaf*

== International attention ==
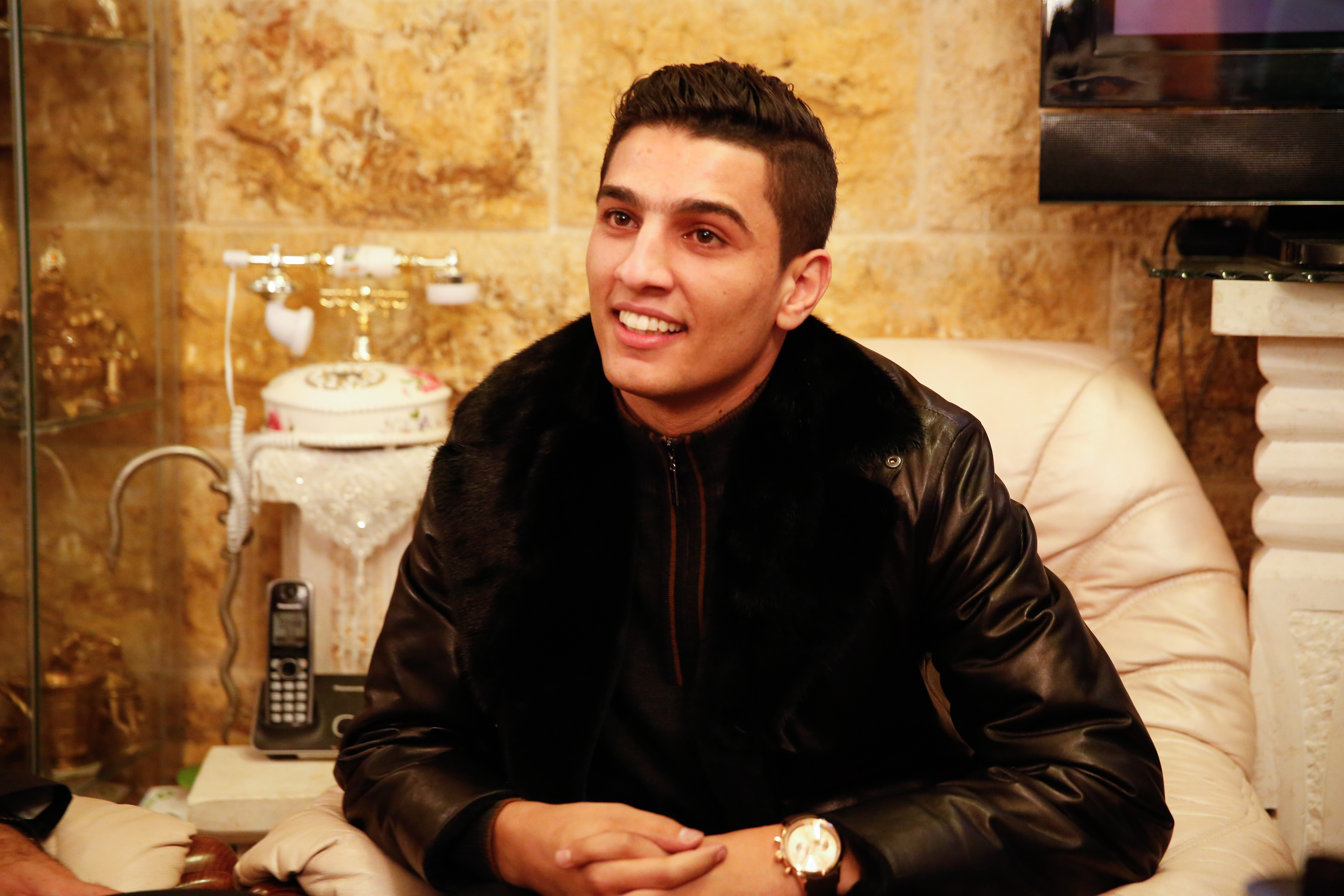
Mohammed Assaf during the interview, in 2014

Assaf has gained widespread popularity throughout the Arab world and among fellow Palestinians from the West Bank, Gaza Strip and the diaspora through his performance of well-known Arabic love songs and patriotic hymns for the Palestinian cause. Family members, neighbors and Palestinians in general have been waiting for his performance in Beirut every Friday night. Board member of Gaza Association for Culture and Arts Jamal Abu Qumsan stated Assaf "has struck a chord with Palestinians by singing classic Arabic songs that deal with issues other than war and struggle ... To many here, that kind of music offers them a sense of stability" amid constantly unstable circumstances due to the conflict with Israel and intra-Palestinian strife. Mohammed Assaf sang in English during one of the live shows of Arab Idol, performing the song "I Want It That Way" by the Backstreet Boys.

The buzz Assaf created has reached the United States, Europe, and recently other parts of Asia due to articles posted by American-based news websites such as Wet Paint, Voice of America, The Japan Times, the CNN news website CNN International, as well as European-based news sites such as Germany's Frankfurter Rundschau. The Guardian published an article titled "Arab Idol favourite Mohammed Assaf carries hopes of Palestinians into final".

Post his widely expected win, Al Jazeera English interviewed him in Doha, Qatar, during his tour, and dedicated an entire episode of the programme Inside Story detailing Assaf's journey through Arab Idol. He was described as "the wedding singer from Gaza who was brought up in a refugee camp, to become an international star and a Palestinian hero."

In May 2023, his 2015 Track 'Ana Dammi Falastini' (My Blood is Palestinian), was removed from Streaming Platforms Spotify and Apple Music which led to a huge public uproar online. Assaf told The New Arab's Arabic-language site that he received an email from Spotify saying his song "Ana Dammi Falastini" was removed under the pretence of "inciting against Israel." A Spotify representative responded to this with a statement regarding the deleted song: “The removal of some of Mohammed Assaf’s content was not determined by Spotify, but rather by the distributor. We anticipate its return in the near future and apologise for any inconvenience caused.” The song was back on Spotify after a couple of days.

== Political impact ==
While Assaf has normally avoided politics on the show, he has stated "I can't differentiate between my art and my patriotic attitude." Assaf condemned the ongoing Israeli occupation of West Bank and the poor living conditions in the Gaza Strip. He also stated that Palestinian prisoner Samer Issawi's long-term hunger strike protest had inspired him. He frequently performed donning the checkered keffiyeh popularly associated with Palestinian nationalism.

He is highly popular in the Palestinian territories, where the Washington Post notes that the "streets of Gaza empty out" when the show goes on air on Fridays and Saturdays. Throughout the West Bank and the Gaza Strip, large posters promoting Assaf have been hung on residences and shops. A source of pride, Assaf has been able to unite Palestinians' sympathies in a way that Palestinian political factions have not been able.

Some Palestinian politicians have shown their support for the singer who has been creating a sense of unity among Palestinians, regardless of differing political beliefs. Salam Fayyad, former Prime Minister of the Palestinian National Authority, called on all Palestinians to support Assaf. Palestinian President Mahmoud Abbas had also called for Palestinians everywhere, including the diaspora, to vote for Assaf.

Although prior to his participation in Arab Idol, Assaf stated he had been briefly detained by the security forces of the conservative Hamas party and paramilitary group—which maintains de facto control over Gaza—on over 20 different occasions in an effort to dissuade him from singing, the group has not suppressed Palestinian support for Assaf or viewership of the show. Signalling a shift in attitude, a Gaza-based Hamas MP, Yahya Mousa, lauded Assaf and referred to him the "ambassador for Palestinian art."

== Film The Idol ==
The Idol is a 2015 Palestinian drama film and biopic about Assaf's life, directed by Hany Abu-Assad. It was shown in the Special Presentations section of the 2015 Toronto International Film Festival. The Idol was partially filmed on location in Gaza, the first feature film to be shot there in decades, with further filmings in Jenin, Amman, Beirut and Cairo. The Idol was produced in association with the Doha Film Institute and the support of the Netherlands Film Fund. the film was selected as the Palestinian entry for the Best Foreign Language Film at the 89th Academy Awards but it was not nominated.

== After Arab Idol ==
Assaf has enjoyed pan-Arab and Arab diaspora popularity internationality engaging in sold-out tours. He released a number of music videos and in 2014, was invited to sing during FIFA World Cup celebrations with "Yalla Yalla". He has also released a number of collaborative singles. His 2017 hit "Baddek Enayah" (in Arabic بدّك عناية) features the Cuban reggaeton group Gente de Zona. Also in 2017, he released "Rani" as a bilingual Arabic and French duet with French Algerian raï singer Faudel and in 2018 collaborated with Lebanese-Canadian Massari in the single "Roll with It".

Along with Wafaa Alnjeili, Badeel Band, and Palestine's first heavy metal band, Osprey V., Mohammed Assaf was one of the artists to take part in the April 2021 "Live for Gaza" livestream concert event that also included Roger Waters, Tom Morello, and Brian Eno.

== Personal life ==
Assaf married the 28-year-old Reem Ouda in an intimate wedding on August 8, 2020. Only family and handful of friends attended. Ouda is a Palestinian-Danish woman who lived with her family in Saudi Arabia for a few years, before moving to Denmark after her father died.

== Discography ==
=== Albums ===
- 2014: Assaf (Arabic: عساف)
- 2017: Ma Wahshnak (Arabic: ما وحشناك)
- 2021: Qesas min Flistin (Arabic: قصص من فلسطين)

=== Singles and music videos ===
- 2014: "Ya Halali Ya Mali" (Arabic: يا حلالي يا مالي)
- 2015: "Aywa Ha Ghanni" (Arabic: ايوه هغني)
- 2015: "Dammi Falastini" (Arabic: دمي فلسطيني)
- 2016: "Seyouf El Ezz" (Arabic: سيوف العز)
- 2017: "Baddek Enayah" (feat. Gente de Zona) (Levantine Arabic: بدّك عناية)
- 2017: "Rani" (with Faudel)
- 2018: "Roll with It" (with Massari)
- 2019: "Kermalak Enta"
- 2020: "Shhalhalawa"
- 2020: "Dalaa Dalouna"
- 2020: "Salam Allah"
- 2020: "Filastin 'int alruwh" (Levantine Arabic: فلسطين إنت الروح)
- 2020: "Al Hayat" (Arabic: الحياة)
- 2021: "Mraytak"
- 2021: "Al Hara"
- 2021: "Bahrek Gaza" (Arabic: بحرك غزة)
- 2021: "Salute to Al Quds"
- 2021: "Ya Banat Bladna" (Arabic: يا بنات بلدنا)
- 2023: "Ben Jeddah"
- 2024: "Salam Lighaza" (Arabic: سلامُ لغزة)
- 2026: "Maskara" (with Saint Levant) (Arabic: مسكرة)
