= Elsa Yacob =

- Born: 1961
- Occupation: Painter

Elsa Yacob Temenwo (born 1961) is an Eritrean painter and former resistance fighter in the Eritrean War of Independence.

After completing her tenth grade of school in Keren, Elsa Yacob joined the Eritrean People's Liberation Front (EPLF). She fought in her first battle in 1979 at the age of seventeen. The EPLF formed an Art Division to expand their resistance to the cultural front and recruited Yacob and about a dozen other artists. Her most notable work, and one of the few Eritrean paintings to receive international attention, was Woman Hero (1984). The painting centers a defiant female resistance fighter gripping an AK-47 and a grenade with a dead Ethiopian soldier at her feet and two male resistance fighters taking cover. The original oil painting disappeared with a number of other Eritrean artworks being transported from Italy to North America for exhibition, but the image was widely reproduced as a poster. Other combat-themed paintings by Yacob include The Tanks Crushed My Mom (1988), featuring a male resistance fighter holding a crying toddler, and Enemy Plane Bombardment (1990), featuring a mother and child cowering next to some donkeys. She spend most of the war in Sahel and her time there inspired a series of paintings featuring the everyday lives of the semi-nomadic inhabitants.

Following the war she worked as an art teacher at the Asmara Art School. She married and had three children.

She appeared in the documentary The Dream Becomes a Reality: Nation Building and the Continued Struggle of the Women of the Eritrean People's Liberation Front (1995).
