= Yakub Guznej =

Belarusian military leader (1892-?)

Yakub Guznej or Jakub Guzney (born 1892 in the Russian Empire - ?) was a Belarusian socio-political and military leader. He was a member of the Slutsk Defence Action in 1920, and commander of the first company in the First Brigade of the Army for the Belarusian People's Republic.
