= Yacoub Al-Mohana =

Kuwaiti film and musical director (born 1975)

- Born: March 21, 1975 (age 50); Al Kuwait, Kuwait
- Known for: Film and music video director
- Website: Official Facebook Fanpage

Yacoub Yousef Al-Mohana (born March 21, 1975) is a Kuwaiti film and musical director. He had worked musical videos of the Persian Gulf region's popular vocalists such as Rashed Al-Majed, Rahma Mezher and Ali Al Badr. He was noted for his many works of art, including paintings and poetry, and being a very well versed musician, as he acquired skills from his well-versed family of musicians. He has worked on many television commercials, documentaries and concerts. His recent clip was from a notably famous singer from Saudi Arabian artist Rashed Al-Majed song entitled "El Batool".

== Early life ==
Yacoub or Jacob as known to his friends was born in Kuwait. His father was the artistic Kuwaiti musician Yousef Al-Muhanna, and his mother a Lebanese national. He grew up in an artistic family, with a love of art, music and poetry. He learned expertise in music from his uncle, singer and poet, Abdul Mohsen Al-Muhanna Majid Al-Muhanna. Though he grew up in a family of musicians, he chose the field of filmmaking and television for self-expression and artistic passion. He completed high school in the New English School (Kuwait), attended College in City University of Seattle and pursued postgraduate studies in Master of Business Administration in Arab Academy of Science. To develop his artistic talent he traveled to Germany (Hamburg and Wuppertal) and Barcelona, Spain to get expertise in the field of directing and to hone his talent in the field of directing and cinematography.

== Kung Fu Sanda ==
Apart from being a director, Yacoub managed to acquire another skill, of martial arts. Though it may be taken as a hobby, this Kung Fu Sanda as he refers to himself, has won the first bronze medal in the Gulf Kuwaiti official weight of 90 kg. in the Arab Championship in Jordan, in two consecutive years, 2008 and 2009. Though he may have devoted himself as a director, his mental focus could not be restrained from directing only. His strong determination and drive brought him to become a karate champion with an outstanding expertise in martial arts of Islam Fouad of Egypt.
