= Ar Rujum district =

Coordinates: 15.4100°N 43.6606°E

Ar Rujum District
- District
- Interactive map of Ar Rujum District
- Country: Yemen
- Governorate: Al Mahwit

Population (2003)
  - Total: 75,708
- Time zone: UTC+3 (Yemen Standard Time)

Ar Rujum District is a district of the Al Mahwit Governorate, Yemen. As of 2003, the district had a population of 75,708 inhabitants.
