= Yacoub G. Al-Atrash =

Palestinian composer and conductor (born 1978)

- Born: 1978; Beit Sahour, Palestine
- Genres: Arabic; Palestinian
- Occupation: Music composer
- Years active: 2007–present

Yacoub G. Al-Atrash (born 1978) is a music composer and conductor from Palestine. Over the years, Al-Atrash has participated and performed in festivals such as International Festival of Carthage, Jerash Festival, and Mawazine.

Al-Atrash has led orchestras with artists such as Mohammed Assaf, Assala, Omar Al-Abdallat, and Hany Shaker.

== Biography ==
Al-Atrash was born in 1978 in the town of Beit Sahour in Palestine. His father is an olivewood artist known for making ouds from olivewood. From an early age, he was interested in musical instruments, especially the oud and learned the art from his father.

Al-Atrash studied music at the Jordan Academy of Music. He then came back to Palestine to continue studying the oud at Edward Said National Conservatory of Music.

In 2007, he founded Awtar Studio. In the following year, he started the band Awtar which included 18 musicians.

In 2012, he composed the music for the play Nimrod.

In 2014, his work, Palestine Light of Hope, received the Palestine International Award.

In 2021, he started Our Voices with Your Songs project.

== Awards and recognition ==
- 2014: Palestine International Award
