= Younes Yaqoub =

Qatari footballer (born 1986)

Personal information
- Full name: Younes Yaqoub Darwish
- Date of birth: 14 March 1986 (age 40)
- Place of birth: Qatar
- Position: Defender

Senior career*
Years	Team	Apps	(Gls)
2006–2010	Qatar		
2010–2013	Umm Salal	18	(0)
2013–2018	Al-Rayyan	23	(0)
2018–2020	Al-Shahania	17	(1)
- * Club domestic league appearances and goals

Younes Yaqoub (Arabic:يونس يعقوب) (born 14 March 1986) is a Qatari footballer.
