= United Airlines Flight 663 =

2010 aviation incident

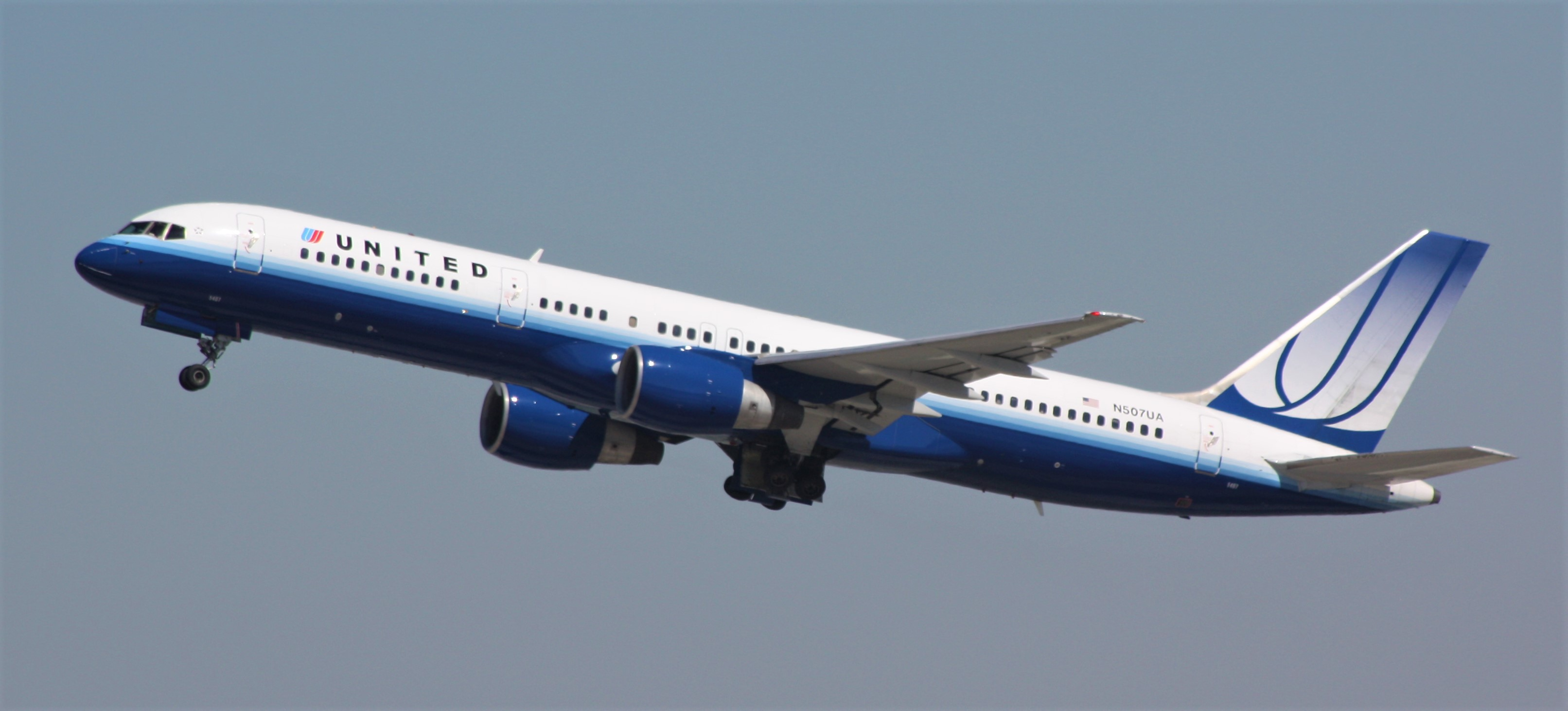
- N507UA, the aircraft involved in the incident, seen in September 2010

Incident
- Date: 7 April 2010
- Summary: Suspected terrorist attack
- Site: en route Washington D.C. to Denver

Aircraft
- Aircraft type: Boeing 757-222
- Operator: United Airlines
- Call sign: UNITED 663
- Registration: N507UA
- Flight origin: Ronald Reagan Washington National Airport, Crystal City, Virginia, U.S.
- Stopover: Denver International Airport, Denver, Colorado, U.S.
- Destination: Las Vegas International Airport, Las Vegas, Nevada, U.S.
- Occupants: 163
- Passengers: 157
- Crew: 6
- Fatalities: 0
- Survivors: 163

United Airlines Flight 663 was a "minor international incident" in 2010 involving a Qatari diplomat on the leg of a United Airlines flight from Ronald Reagan Washington National Airport (Washington, D.C.) to Denver International Airport (Denver, Colorado). The diplomat prompted a mid-air terrorism alert after smoking in the aircraft lavatory, which led the Qatari government to recall him two days later.

== Incident ==
Flight 663 was a flight between Ronald Reagan Washington National Airport in Washington, D.C. and Denver International Airport, continuing on to Las Vegas International Airport using an aircraft different from the one that operated the Washington–Denver sector. On 7 April 2010, a disturbance involving a passenger happened en route from Washington, D.C. to Denver.

Officials identified the passenger as Mohammed al-Madadi, a diplomat from the Embassy of Qatar in Washington, D.C. Officials took al-Madadi into custody, and the plane landed safely in Denver.

The North American Aerospace Defense Command scrambled two F-16 fighters to intercept and escort the aircraft into Denver. Officials said the incident was a misunderstanding after al-Madadi attempted to smoke a pipe in the lavatory, then made "an unfortunate remark" after being confronted by two members of the Federal Air Marshal Service. Law enforcement officials said al-Madadi mentioned "lighting his shoes", taken as a reference to shoe bomber Richard Reid.

Qatari Ambassador to the United States Ali Bin Fahad Al-Hajri issued a statement on the Embassy website:

Press reports today regarding an incident aboard a commercial flight from Washington, DC to Denver, CO indicate that a Qatari diplomat was detained for suspicious behavior. We respect the necessity of special security precautions involving air travel, but this diplomat was traveling to Denver on official Embassy business on my instructions, and he was certainly not engaged in any threatening activity. The facts will reveal that this was a mistake, and we urge all concerned parties to avoid reckless judgments or speculation.

The Associated Press reported that al-Madadi was traveling on official embassy business to visit Ali Saleh Kahlah al-Marri, a jailed al-Qaeda conspirator held at United States Penitentiary, Florence. Department of Homeland Security Secretary Janet Napolitano praised the air marshals, who had been deployed in greater numbers following the attempted in-air bombing by Umar Farouk Abdulmutallab on December 25, 2009.

Felony charges would be applicable for non-diplomats. U.S. officials said al-Madadi would not face criminal charges because of diplomatic immunity. The suspect was released following interviews with law enforcement officials. United States Department of State officials said al-Madadi was removed from the country by Qatar, rather than being declared persona non grata by the U.S. government and expelled from the United States. Al-Madadi left the United States on April 9, 2010. Qatar's Minister of State for Foreign Affairs Ahmed bin Abdullah Al Mahmood said that al-Madadi would be disciplined.

== Analysis and debate ==
The incident sparked international debate about how a matter of this nature should be handled. In the United States, some analysts objected that Qatar would not be asked to reimburse taxpayers, inconvenienced passengers, and the airline for costs of the incident. Though smoking was banned aboard U.S. commercial airliners in 1990, the cases brought by the Federal Aviation Administration rarely lead to more than a fine. Because of this, the Washington Post reported that some diplomats felt that the incident was a case of racial profiling of Arabs and Muslims. A Wall Street Journal editorial asserted that new profiling techniques based on behavior enjoy "widespread public support." A Scripps News editorial agreed, stating "the success so far of preventing a reprise of 9/11 may just depend on the highest-level reaction and then sorting it all out later." One passenger, author Michael Lind, argued in the Financial Times that "there should have been a debate about overreaction to false alarms. I am as angry as anyone at the Qatari diplomat who escaped prosecution thanks to diplomatic immunity. But the incident was the result of the toxic interaction between his arrogance and foolishness and an airline security system that is irrational as a whole."

In Qatar, the incident provoked criticism of the foreign ministry. An editorial by Ahmad Al Sulaiti in the daily Al-Watan called the event "embarrassing," adding, "While I do not intend to give lessons to the foreign ministry, I wish [Minister] Al Mahmood would tell me if our diplomats are properly groomed before they are sent to our embassies abroad and whether they acquire skills from our veteran ambassadors." Al Mahmood replied that the incident was "an individual misjudgment that should not be over-generalised."
