= Ahmad Gamal (singer) =

Egyptian singer (born 1988)

Ahmad Gamal أحمد جمال
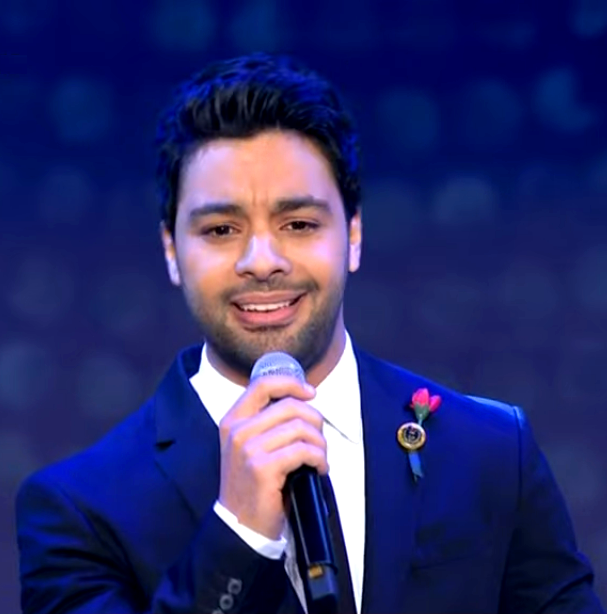

Background information
- Also known as: Esultan (The Sultan), Elking Elsagheer (The Little King ), Elandaleeb Elgedeed (The New Nightingale)
- Born: Ahmad Gamal Abdel Nasser أحمد جمال عبد الناصر; April 2, 1988 (age 37); Tanta, Gharbia Governorate, Egypt
- Genres: Arabic pop music, House music
- Occupations: Singer, composer, pharmacist
- Instrument: Oud
- Years active: 2008–present
- Labels: Platinium Records

Ahmad Gamal (Arabic: أحمد جمال; born 2 April 1988) is an Egyptian singer who rose to fame as the runner-up of the second season of Arab Idol 2013, broadcast by the MBC network. Gamal was among the top three who reached the finals, but he ended up in the second place. Despite his ending as a runner-up, he won the hearts of millions around the Arab world. The Egyptian singer and composer also has a degree in chemistry and is a licensed pharmacist. Before Arab Idol, Gamal caught the attentions of many big musicians such as Ammar El Sherei, Hany Mahanna and Mohammed Elhelw. Gamal likes both Eastern and Western music, especially the Egyptian Folk music and House Music. Most of his songs are of his composition. Gamal was distinguished in Arab Idol with his deep strong sensitive voice, that one of the critics said: "his voice is like a violin and doesn't need music while singing". Gamal became widely known with his title Esultan (The Sultan), given to him by Arab Idol judges. Moreover, his fans have given him many titles such as, Elking Elsagheer (The Little King), and Elandaleeb Elgedeed (the New Nightingale).
