= Muhammad Hussein Yacoub =

Egyptian Islamic scholar

Abu 'Alala' Muhammad ibn Hussein ibn Yacoub
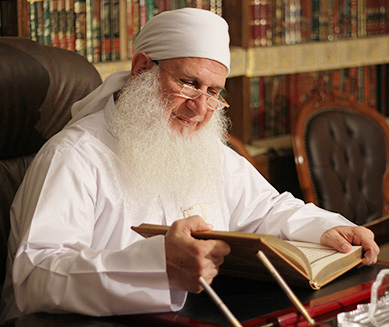

Personal life
- Born: 1956 (age 69–70) Giza, Egypt
- Era: Modern era
- Region: Saudi Arabia

Religious life
- Religion: Islam
- Denomination: Sunni
- Movement: Salafism

Muslim leader
- Influenced by: Abd al-Aziz ibn Baz Muhammad ibn al Uthaymeen Muhammad Abu Khubza

Muhammad Hussein Yacoub (Arabic: محمد حسين يعقوب) is a Salafi Islamic scholar in the Arab world who has given hundreds of lectures in Da'wah. A number of his books are currently being published.

== Early life ==
He was born in 1956 in the Matimdiyah area of Imbaba, in the Al Jizah Governorate in Egypt. Yacoub is the oldest of four brothers and has one older sister.

== Education ==
Yacoub memorized the entire Qur'an at an early age, and learned about the study of Hadith. He studied the six canonical books of Sunni Islam with Moroccan scholar Muhammad Abu Khubza, in addition to studying with fellow Egyptian Abd al-Hamid Kishk. He then lived in Saudi Arabia from 1980 to 1985, studying with Saudi clerics Abd al-Aziz ibn Baz and Muhammad ibn al Uthaymeen.

== Reception ==
In June 2021, Yacoub was summoned to the Cairo Tora Court complex for urging the public to mobilize "in support of legitimacy" during the events of the 2013 Egyptian coup d'état.

== Works ==
He had various lessons and lectures such as:

- “Cures” (In Arabic: الأدوية).
- “How to Repent” (In Arabic: كيف أتوب؟).
- “Bring upon us to the direction” (In Arabic: إلى الهدى ائتنا).

Moreover, he wrote lots of books, such as:

- “Description of Conformer Woman” (In Arabic: صفات الأخت الملتزمة).
- “The serious Conformer”. (In Arabic:الجدية في الالتزام).
- "The secrets of Ramadan lovers ". (In Arabic:أسرار المحبين في رمضان).
- "A new heart for those who want." (In Arabic: قلب جديد لمن يريد).
