= Jordan Academy of Music =

Jordanian private university

Coordinates: 31.9708°N 35.8949°E

- الأكاديمية الأردنية للموسيقى
- Established: 1989
- Location: Amman, Jordan
- Nickname: JAM
- Website: http://jam.edu.jo

Jordan Academy of Music is a private university located in Amman, Jordan. Established in 1989, its goal is to develop musical culture in the country.
