= Hassan El Shafei =

Egyptian record producer

- حسن الشافعي
- Born: 9 October 1982 (age 44); Cairo, Egypt

Hassan El Shafei (Arabic: حسن الشافعي; born 9 October 1982) is an Egyptian record producer and media personality. He won the best music producer award at the Middle East Music Awards in 2009.

== Biography ==
El Shafei won DG magazine's award for Best Music Arranger in 2007 and 2009. El Shafei has produced and arranged for Amr Diab, Hossam Habib, Angham, Sherine, Abdel Mejid Abdallah and Nancy Ajram. He founded the Basement Records label in 2010 with his business partner Mohamed El Shaer. He was a judge on multiple seasons of Arab Idol, which premiered in 2011. In 2014 he released 'Mayestahlushi' under his own name, featuring Abla Fahita. In 2024 he mastered the song Dahaya ('Victims') which criticised Israel in the Gaza war.

== See also ==
- Arab Idol
