= Yacoub Sidi Ethmane =

Mauritanian footballer (born 1995)

Personal information
- Full name: Yacoub Sidi Ethmane
- Date of birth: 10 December 1995 (age 30)
- Place of birth: Nouakchott, Mauritania
- Height: 1.88 m (6 ft 2 in)
- Position: Midfielder

Team information
- Current team: Al Tahaddy

Senior career*
Years	Team	Apps	(Gls)
2018–2020	Nouadhibou		
2020–2022	Vita Club		
2022–2023	Nouadhibou		
2023–2024	Al Khums		
2024–2025	Al Ittihad Tripoli	9	(0)
2025	Al Ittihad Misurata	5	(0)
2025–	Al Tahaddy	7	(0)

International career^{‡}
2019–	Mauritania	16	(1)
- * Club domestic league appearances and goals as of 10:42, 20 February 2026 (UTC) ‡ National team caps and goals as of 20:55, 5 September 2025 (UTC)

Yacoub Sidi Ethmane (Arabic: يعقوب سيدي عثمان; born 10 December 1995) is a Mauritanian professional footballer who plays as a midfielder for Libyan Premier League club Al Tahaddy and the Mauritania national team.

== International career ==
Yacoub has scored one goal for Mauritania; it came in a 4–1 friendly loss to Algeria on 3 June 2021.

== Career statistics ==
=== International goals ===
Mauritania score listed first, score column indicates score after each Yacoub goal.

List of international goals scored by Sidi Yacoub
No.	Cap	Date	Venue	Opponent	Score	Result	Competition	Ref.
1	4	3 June 2021	Mustapha Tchaker Stadium, Blida, Algeria	Algeria	1–1	4–1	Friendly	

== Honours ==
Nouadhibou

- Ligue 1 Mauritania: 2018–19, 2019–20
