= Wael Kfoury =

Lebanese singer-songwriter (born 1974)

- وائل كفوري
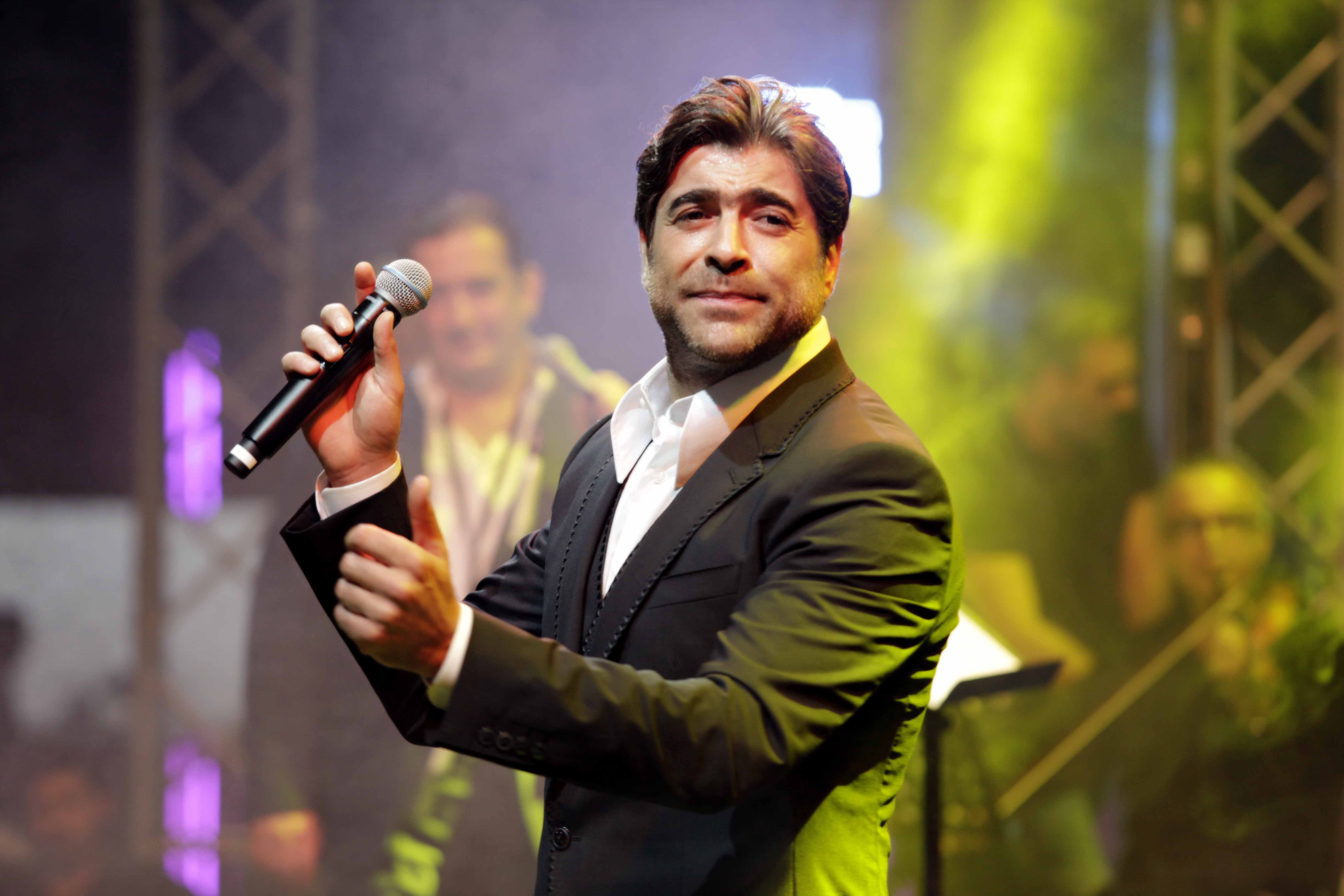
- Kfoury in July 2017
- Born: Michel Émile Kfoury ميشال إميل كفوري; 14 September 1974 (age 52); Zahlé, Lebanon
- Occupations: Singer; musician; songwriter; actor
- Years active: 1992–present
- Height: 5 ft 9 in (175 cm)
- Spouse: Angela Bechara (m. 2010)
- Children: 2
- Musical career
- Genres: Arabic pop; mawwal; folk
- Labels: Rotana Music Group; Music Box International; EMI Music Arabia

Michel Émile Kfoury (Arabic: ميشال إميل كفوري; born 14 September 1974), known by his stage name Wael Kfoury (Arabic: وائل كفوري), is a Lebanese singer, musician, songwriter, and actor.

== Career ==
Wael studied solfège at the Holy Spirit University of Kaslik.

== Commercial deals ==
Kfoury signed a publicity campaign deal for PepsiCo's PepsiArabia affiliate. Following this deal, he starred in the PepsiCo-sponsored movie "Bahr el Noujoum" (Sea of Stars).

In February 2009, he announced cooperation with LG Electronics for a search for future music stars.

== Personal life ==
Kfoury was born into a Melkite Greek Catholic family. He is married to Angela Bechara; their relationship and marriage was kept a secret for some time from the press. The couple have two daughters: one named Michèle (b. September 10, 2011), whose name comes from the feminine equivalent of her father's name Michel; and one named Milana (b. June 1, 2016).

== Albums ==
- 1994: Shafouha W Sarou Y'oulou (شافوها وصارو يقولوا)
- 1995: Mayyet Fiki (ميت فيكي)
- 1996: Ba'd el Sentayn (بعد السنتين)
- 1997: Tna'shar Shaher (اتنعشر شهر)
- 1998: Shubbak el Houb (شباك الحب)
- 1999: Hikayat 'Asheq (حكاية عاشق)
- 2000: Sa'alouni (سألوني)
- 2001: Shou Ra'yak (شو رأيك)
- 2003: Oumry Killo (عمري كلو)
- 2004: Qorb Liyya (قرب ليى)
- 2005: Bhebak Ana Ktir (بحبك أنا كتير)
- 2007: Byihenn (بيحنّ)
- 2010: Kfoury Classic perfect
- 2012: Ya Dalli Ya Rouhi (يا ضلي يا روحي)
- 2014: Al Gharam El Moustahil (الغرام المستحيل)
- 2017: W.
- 2025: WK 25
