= Music of Palestine =

The music of Palestine (Arabic: الموسيقى الفلسطينية) is one of many regional subgenres of Arabic music. While it shares much in common with Arabic music, both structurally and instrumentally, there are musical forms and subject matter that are distinctively Palestinian.

== Pre-1948 ==
In the areas now controlled by both Israel and Palestine, multiple ethnic groups and religions have long held on to a diversity of cultures. Mandatory Palestine population with Arabs (including urban and rural Muslim classes, Arab Christians, Druze and Muslim Bedouin) constituted the largest group, followed by Jews (including Sephardim, Mizrahim and Ashkenazim), Samaritans, Circassians, Armenians, Dom and others. Wasif Jawhariyyeh was one oud player, famous for his post-1904 diary.

=== Folk music ===
Early in the 20th century, Palestinian Arabs lived in cities and in rural areas, either as farmers or as nomads. The fellahin (farmers) sang a variety of work songs, used for tasks like fishing, shepherding, harvesting and making olive oil. Traveling storytellers and musicians called zajaleen were also common, known for their epic tales. Weddings were also home to distinctive music, especially the dabke. Popular songs made use of widely varying forms, particularly the mejana and dal'ona.

== Post-1948 ==
=== Folk music ===
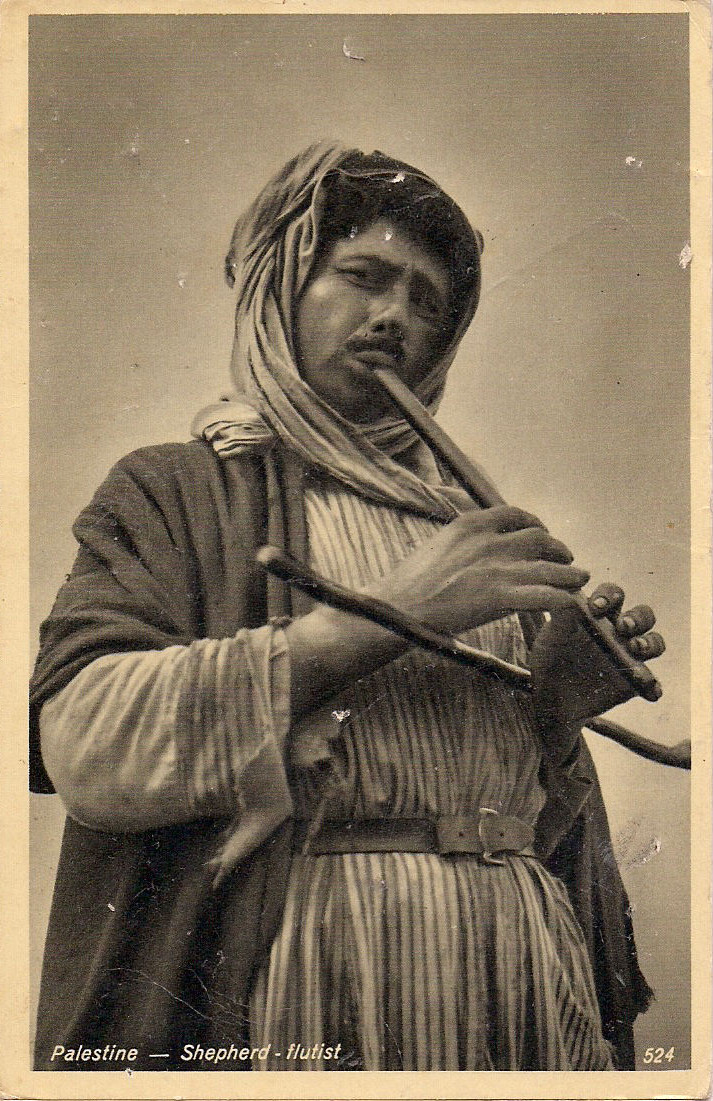
Palestinian shepherd flutist in traditional dress, c.1910–1920

After the creation of Israel in 1948, large numbers of Arab Palestinians fled to, or were forced into, refugee camps in the West Bank and Gaza Strip. The most popular recorded musicians at the time were the superstars of Arab classical music, especially Umm Kulthum and Sayed Darwish. The centers for Palestinian music were in the Palestinian towns of Nazareth and Haifa, where performers composed in the classical styles of Cairo and Damascus. A shared Palestinian identity was reflected in a new wave of performers who emerged with distinctively Palestinian themes, relating to the dreams of statehood and the burgeoning nationalist sentiment.

In the 1970s, a new wave of popular Palestinian stars emerged, including Sabreen, Mustafa Al-Kurd and Al Ashiqeen. After the First Intifada (1987), a more hard-edged group of performers and songwriters emerged, such as al- Funoun, Suhail Khoury, Jameel al-Sayih, Thaer Barghouti's Doleh song and Sabreen's Mawt a'nabi.

In the 1990s, the Palestinian National Authority was established, and Palestinian cultural expression began to stabilize. Wedding bands, which had all but disappeared during the fighting, reappeared to perform popular Egyptian and Lebanese songs. Other performers to emerge later in the 90s included Yuad, Washem, Mohsen Subhi, Adel Salameh, Issa Boulos, Wissam Joubran, Samir Joubran, and Basel Zayed with his new sound of Palestine and Turab group founded in 2004 with the CD Hada Liel.

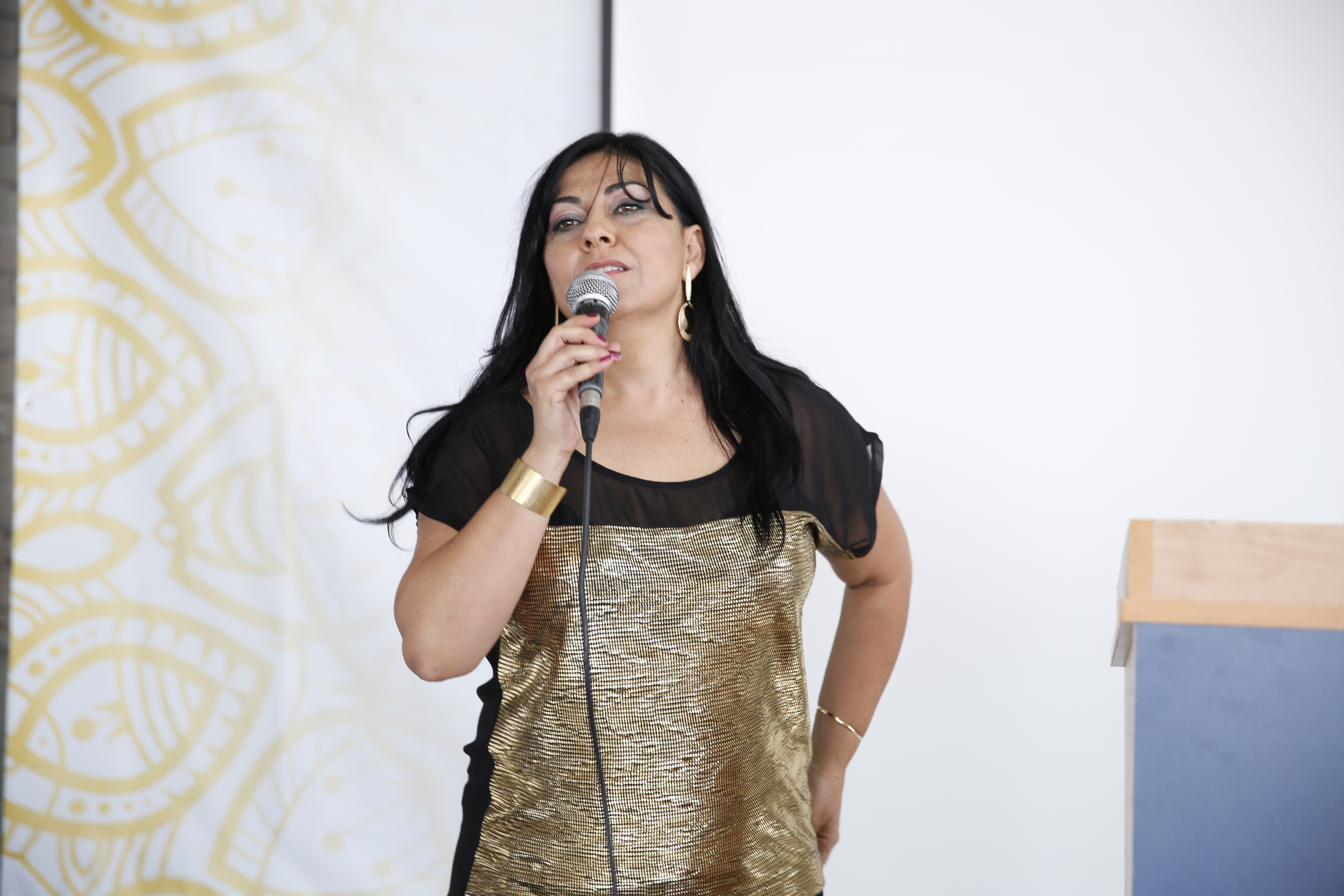
Amal Murkus is a Palestinian singer.

The Diaspora Palestinian Reem Kelani is one of the foremost present day researchers and performers of music with a specifically Palestinian narrative and heritage. Her 2006 debut solo album Sprinting Gazelle – Palestinian Songs from the Motherland and the Diaspora comprised Kelani's research and arrangement of five traditional Palestinian songs, whilst the other five songs were her own musical settings of popular and resistance poetry by the likes of Mahmoud Darwish, Salma Khadra Jayyusi, Rashid Hussein and Mahmoud Salim al-Hout. All the songs on the album relate to pre-1948 Palestine.

A large part of Palestinian music comprises wedding songs and dances. Due to the large amount of weddings in Palestinian culture, wedding singers have been able to maintain the tradition of Palestinian songs whilst incorporating modern vocals and rhythms. Wedding singers draw from a repertoire of ceremonial material including henna songs sung at the henna ceremony, wedding processionals (zeffat), and popular debkah and dance songs.

=== Classical music ===
Before 1948, the Palestinians formed a part of the Arab cultural mosaic in the Levant, and it was difficult to separate them from the cultural and musical composition of the Syrian people. Although the popular music was limited to the genre of folk music that served the needs of ritual and social events varied, but the beginnings of a serious musical phenomenon began to form in Palestine with the presence of profound composers of the first generation, such as Augustin Lama, Yousef Khasho, Salvador Arnita and others. The second generation of composers included among others, Patrick Lama, Amin Nasser, Nasri Fernando Dueri and Saleem Zoughbi. The third generation includes younger musicians such as Habib Hasan Touma, Mounir Anastas, Bichara El Khail and Sam Gebran.

During the Israeli occupation, Palestinian classical music continued to grow, with several symphony orchestras founded (such as the Palestinian Youth Orchestra, and West-Eastern Divan, founded by Daniel Barenboim and Edward Said) as well as string quartets and quintets. This gave the Palestinian Territories the highest number of orchestras among Arab countries.

=== Palestinian composers ===
- Salvador Arnita (1914–1985)
- Daniel Barenboim (born in Buenos Aires, 1942)
- Habib Hasan Touma (born in Nazareth, 1934, died in Berlin 1998)
- Nasri Fernando Dueri (born 1932)
- François Nicodeme (born in Jerusalem 1935) and his brother William Nicodeme
- Amin Nasser in Ramleh 1935
- Patrick Lama
- Abdel-Hamid Hamam
- Saleem Zoughbi
- Mahmoud Abuwarda (born in Gaza, 1990)

=== War songs ===
Palestinian war songs prominently feature references to resistance against the occupation of Palestine, calling on Palestinians to fight the occupation and stay in their land, and describing historic events.

== Music and identity ==
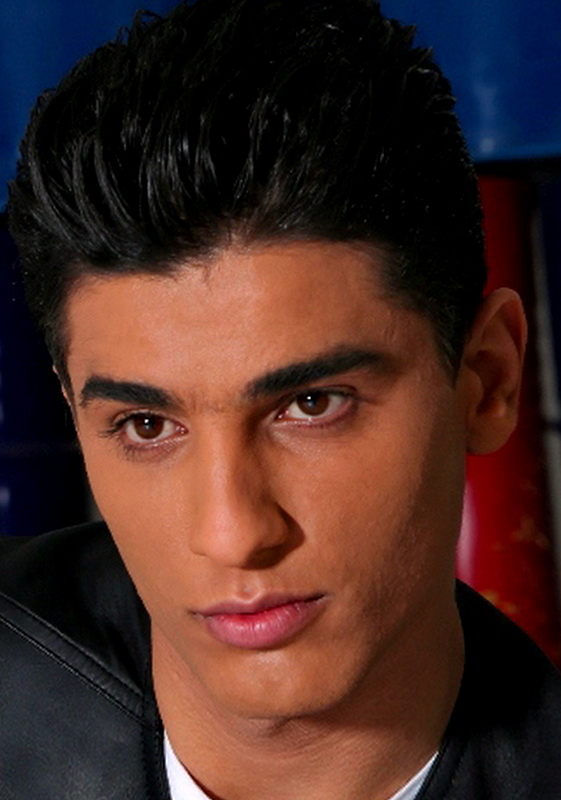
Mohammed Assaf is a Palestinian pop singer.

Palestinian music reflects Palestinian experience. As might be expected, much of it deals with the struggle of living under Israeli occupation, the longing for peace, and the love of the land of Palestine. A typical example of such a song is Baladi, Baladi (My Country, My Country), which has become the unofficial Palestinian national anthem:

Palestine, Land of the fathers,
To you, I do not doubt, I will return.
Struggle, revolution, do not die,
For the storm is on the land.

Ya Zareef Al- Tool is one of the most popular Palestinian songs of today and can be traced back decades. The song encourages Palestinians not to leave their homeland:

يا زريف الطول وقّف تاقلك ... رايح عالغربة و بلادك أحسنلك
خايف يا زريف تروح و تتملك .. و تعاشر الغير و تنساني أنا

"O, elegant and tall one stop so I can tell you
You are going abroad and your country is better for you
I am afraid you will get established there
And find someone else and forget me"

Mohammad Assaf (born in 1989) rose to international fame and brought attention to Palestinian music when he became the first Palestinian to win the Arab Idol competition in 2013 in the second season. In 2015, he released a single Ana Dammi Falastini ("My Blood is Palestinian"), which became a Palestinian anthem of sorts.

Mohammad Assaf would go on to be one of the highest selling Palestinian artists of all time.

== Forms of traditional Palestinian songs ==
Armure Hijaz 01

Armure Hijaz 02

Armure Hijaz 03

Unlike many other cultures, traditional Palestinian songs have no set lyrics but rather a set rhythm. The singers are usually family members or close friends who make up the lyrics on the spot. At modern Palestinian events there may be a professional singer, but the forms mentioned below, still very popular today, were created before the popularization of professional singers. Therefore, the song lyrics differ from city to city. Many types of Palestinian songs, including Atab/Mejana and Dal'ona, have transcended time. Due to the relevance of the subject matter and the need to maintain tradition and culture, traditional types of Palestinian songs can still be heard at events of today, such as weddings or gatherings. They still remain extremely popular throughout the Palestinian culture. Among the forms:

- Ataaba is the most popular type of song in Palestine. It is often sung by farmers, workers, and shepherds as a work song. However, weddings are the main environment for the songs. As with the other forms of songs, Mejana is based on poetry. Usually the singer starts with the long sound of "Ooaaaff". Then the verses of ataba follow. Ataba is composed of four verses of poetry. The first three end with the same word in sound but different meanings. The fourth verse ends with a word that usually ends with a sound like "Aab or Aywa!"
- Dal'ona is the second most popular type of song in Palestine. It is easier to compose than ataba because it does not require the similar sound of the ends of the first three verses. However, like ataba, dal'na has four verses of poetry, where the first three have similar endings and the fourth usually ends with a sound like "Oana". Dal'ona is the sound of the Palestinian popular dance, dabka, where the dancers sing it along with the sound of the shubbabah (flute), yarghool or mijwiz.
- The Sahja is another popular form of Palestinian song usually sung at weddings. It may be done by men or women and involves clapping to the rhythm of the song that is being sung to the bride by women, or groom by men. The men gather in two lines facing each other, or surround the groom. Then the zajal leads the sahja. The zajal is a talented singer or close family member who sings the sahja on the spot. The zajal leads the sahja with a verse, and the entire group repeats. The sahja done by women carries out the same process but with many women leading (usually older women) while the young women repeat. Also, the women may add a loud, "Lolololeey" during and at the end of the sahja. There is no female zajal.
- Zaghareet (pl), one of the oldest forms of Palestinian song, is another important form of song during Palestinian weddings. The zaghreet is traditionally sung by women at weddings or important events. One woman starts the zaghroot with a loud "Heeey Hee..." or "Aweeha...". She then continues with a short poem or few rhyming words. After the women are done, they all join with a loud, "Lolololoolololoeeeey" sound. Unlike the women's sahja, the zaghroot involves no clapping, and only one woman must take turns to offer a zaghareet.

== Palestinian hip hop ==
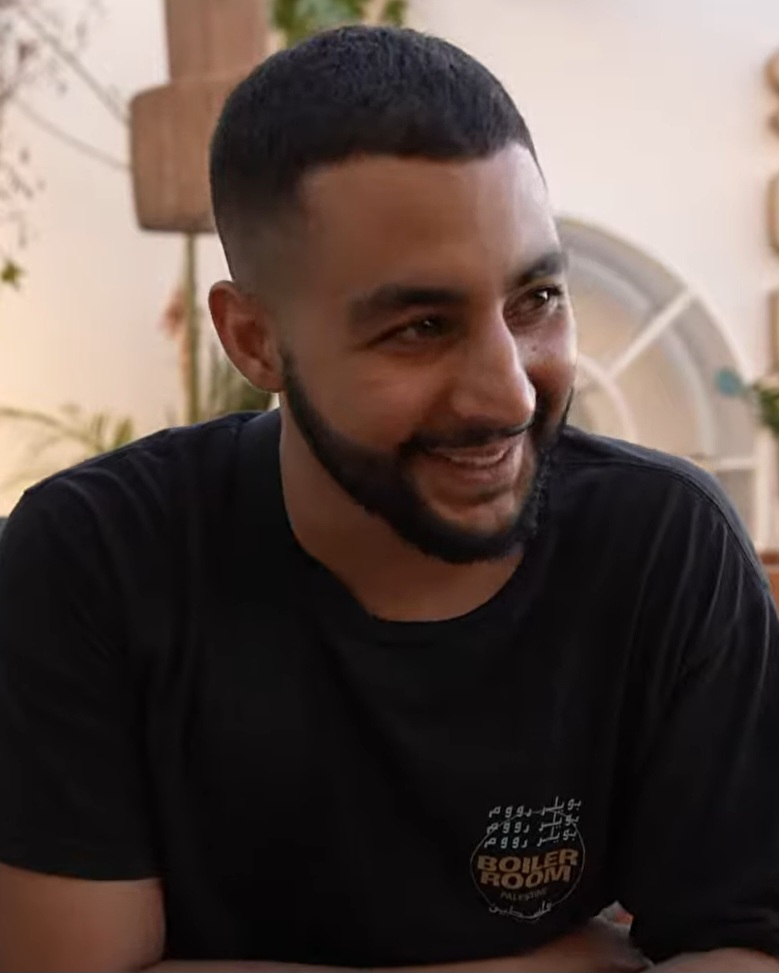
Palestinian Rapper Shabjdeed

Beginning in the late 1990s, Palestinian youth forged a new Palestinian musical subgenre – Palestinian rap or hip hop – which blends Arabic melodies and Western beats, with lyrics in Arabic, English and even Hebrew.

Borrowing from traditional rap music that first emerged in the ghettos of Los Angeles and New York in the 1970s, "young Palestinian musicians have tailored the style to express their own grievances with the social and political climate in which they live and work."

DAM were pioneers in forging this blend. As Arab citizens of Israel, they rap in Arabic, Hebrew, and English, often challenging stereotypes about Palestinians and Arabs head-on in songs like "Meen Erhabe?" ("Who's a terrorist?")

More peculiar is the West Bank group Ramallah Underground, found by the two brothers Boikutt and Stormtrap. Their sound is a mix of hip hop, trip hop, and downtempo alongside traditional Arab music. There are many rappers who defend Palestinian nationalism, an example being, Ortega (Alhasan) who caused a sensation in the Israeli media in 2012 because of his songs' hostility to Israel. Ortega (Alhasan) is considered a better performer of Palestinian rap in the Persian Gulf region, because he was born in the United Arab Emirates.

[[Shabjdeed|Oday Abbas (Arabic: عدي عباس; born 1995), better known by his stage name Shabjdeed (Levantine Arabic: شب جديد or شبجديد, lit. 'New Guy'), is a Palestinian rapper from Kafr 'Aqab, Jerusalem.]] Based in the city of Ramallah, he has become an influential figure in underground Palestinian hip-hop.

In the diaspora are the Abu-Ghaben brothers, who founded Jaffa Phonix in Cairo, Egypt. They blended big-beat, hip hop, and vocal punk elements.

== Opposition to music ==
According to the human rights organization Freemuse, Palestinian musicians feared what was going to happen in the Palestinian territories where Islamic fundamentalists have become increasingly assertive since the militant Hamas group scored political gains in the Palestinian Authority local elections of 2005.

In 2005 an outdoor music and dance performance in Qalqiliya was suddenly banned by the Hamas led municipality, for the reason that such an event would be forbidden by Islam. The municipality also ordered that music no longer be played in the Qalqiliya zoo, and mufti Akrameh Sabri issued a religious edict affirming the municipality's decision. In response, the Palestinian national poet Mahmoud Darwish warned that "There are Taliban-type elements in our society, and this is a very dangerous sign".

The Palestinian columnist Mohammed Abd Al-Hamid, a resident of Ramallah, warned that this religious coercion could cause the migration of artists, and said "The religious fanatics in Algeria destroyed every cultural symbol, shattered statues and rare works of art and liquidated intellectuals and artists, reporters and authors, ballet dancers and singers – are we going to imitate the Algerian and Afghani examples?"

== Musicians and instruments from Palestine, anno 1860 ==
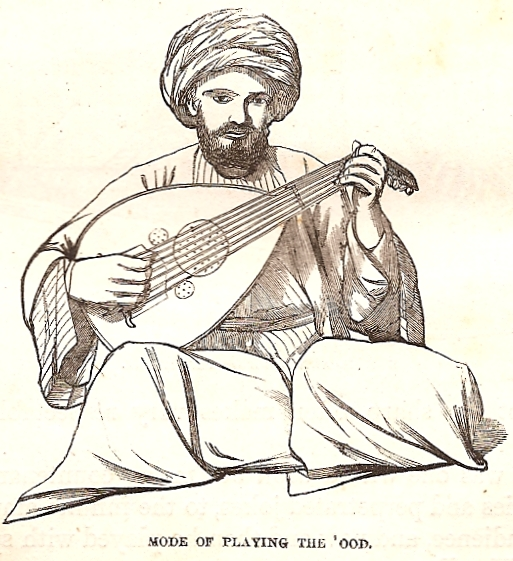
Palestinian Oud player

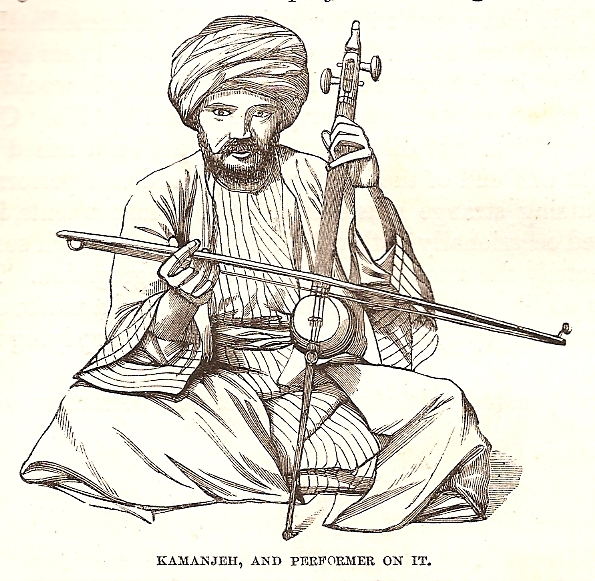
Palestinian Kamanjah player

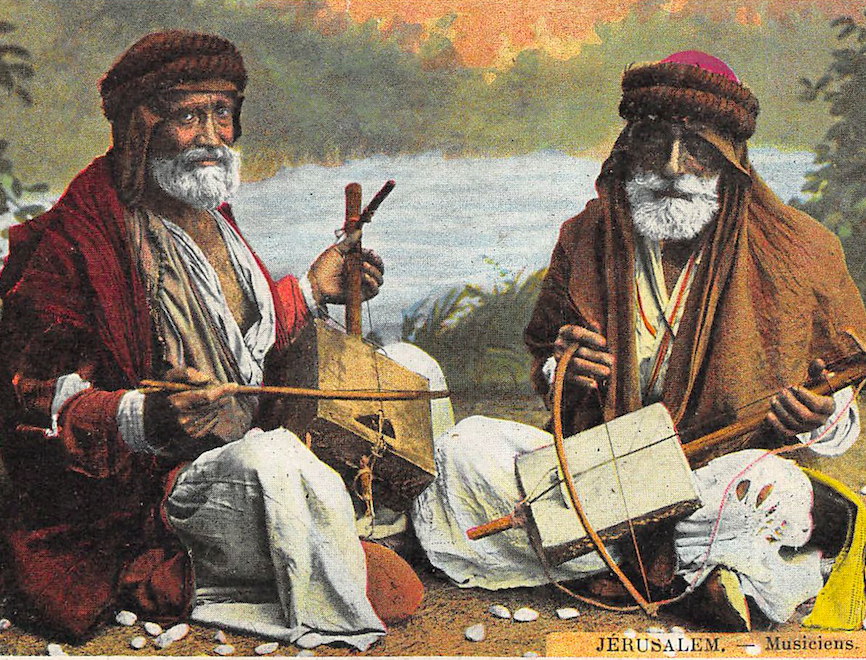
Musicians in Jerusalem, late 19th century

== See also ==
- List of Palestinians: Musicians
- Palestinian Arabic
- Palestinians
- Louis Brehony
- Muhareb Theeb

== Books ==
- Morgan, Andy and Mu'tasem Adileh. "The Sounds of Struggle". 2000. In Broughton, Simon and Ellingham, Mark with McConnachie, James and Duane, Orla (ed.), World Music, Vol. 1: Africa, Europe and the Middle East, pp. 385–390. Rough Guides Ltd, Penguin Books. ISBN 1-85828-636-0
