= Joffa =

Joffa may refer to:

== People ==
- Joffa Corfe, Australian (born 1964), leader of the Collingwood Football Club cheer squad
- Joff Ellen (1915–1999), "Joffa boy", Australian entertainer, actor and comedian
- Joffa Smith, British games programmer
- Anna Joffa Vardi, mother of American viola player Emanuel Vardi
- Colleen Howe (born Colleen Joffa, 1933–2009), American sports agent who founded Power Play International and Power Play Publications
- Bernard Joffa, nominated for Best Live Action Short Film, see 63rd Academy Awards

== Other ==
- Joffa: The Movie, a 2010 Australian buddy comedy film
- Joffa, combination chin and mouthguard strapped onto the bottom of a BMX racer's helmet, see John Purse
- Jofa, Jonssons Fabriker
- Jewish Orthodox Feminist Alliance or JOFA

== See also ==
- Jaffa (disambiguation)
- Jaffe
- Jaffee
- Joffe (disambiguation)
