= Mahmoud Abuwarda =

Palestinian composer and guitarist (born 1990)

Mahmoud Abuwarda محمود أبو وردة
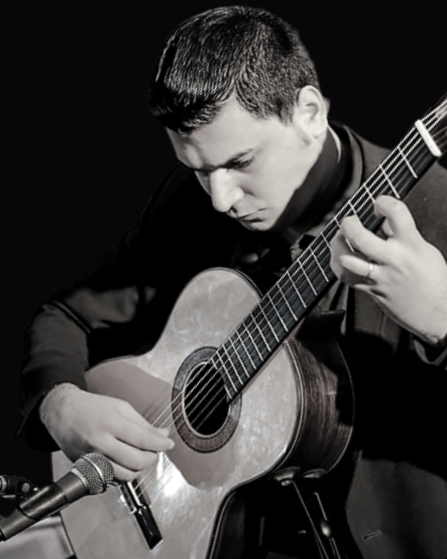
- Mahmoud Abuwarda

Background information
- Born: September 28, 1990 (age 35); Gaza Strip
- Origin: Palestine
- Genres: Contemporary
- Occupations: Composer and guitarist
- Instrument: Guitar
- Label: Halidon
- Publisher: Halidon Music
- Website: mahmoudabuwarda.com

Mahmoud Abuwarda (born 1990) is a Palestinian composer, classical guitarist, and music educator based in Istanbul. His compositions, which include chamber, orchestral, and solo instrumental music, combine traditional Arabic music with Western classical traditions. His works have been performed in the Middle East, Europe, the United Kingdom, and the United States.

== Early life and education ==
Abuwarda was born in Gaza in 1990. He studied in classical guitar at the Edward Said National Conservatory of Music in Palestine, where he studied under guitarist Pedro López de La Osa. He later studied music theory and composition through Berklee College of Music on a Gary Burton Scholarship. He also studied composition privately with Houtaf Khoury, Julian Broughton, Nejc Kuhar, and Maurice Saylor.

== Music style ==
Abuwarda's compositions incorporate themes related to his background in Gaza. The Fondazione Milano described his music as addressing themes of fear and loss, noting his use of contrasting musical dynamics to reflect these experiences. Stylistcally, his works integrate traditional Arabic musical modalities with contemporary Western classical music, spanning symphonic, chamber, and solo instrumental genres.

== Career and compositions ==
Between 2012 and 2022, Abuwarda taught guitar, composition, and music theory at the Edward Said National Conservatory of Music, where he also served as head of the guitar department and academic supervisor. He has also taught at Zemas College in Istanbul. In Turkey, Abuwarda co-founded the Istanbul International Conservatory of Music and serves as its academic director. He has also taught at Rumeli International College.

Abuwarda served as the Sea and Freedom Music Festival in Palestine, and participated in the Lisbon and Sintra Film Festival (LEFFEST) in Portugal.

In 2025, Abuwarda's orchestral work A Story to Tell premiered in Portugal, performed by the Orquestra Sinfonietta de Lisboa at the Festa do Avante festival. In 2026, he was announced as a winner of the JERUS-IT-ARTS International Contest, a European initiative promoting intercultural dialogue.

In the field of music education, his pedagogical approach and his co-authored collection Scenes from Palestinian Childhood were discussed and analyzed in an April 2026 article published in the American MTNA e-Journal.

While his primary performance instrument is the classical guitar, his compositional work frequently focuses on the piano. In April 2026, he collaborated with Italian pianist Alberto Nones to co-compose Nocturne No. 6: Nothing or Something. The piece, recorded in Pesaro, Italy, was scheduled for release by the Italian classical record label Halidon Music.

In 2026, Abuwarda composed the original music for ''Invisible'', an immersive documentary film exploring the destroyed cultural heritage of Gaza. Produced by the French studio Iconem in collaboration with Palestinian art collectives, the 3D exhibition premiered at the Sahab Festival at La Gaîté Lyrique in Paris. In July 2026, a Mandela Day fundraiser concert titled Notes from Exile was held in Cape Town, South Africa. The program consisted of ten original compositions by Abuwarda, performed by local musicians. The event was covered by publications including Time Out Cape Town and the Atlantic Sun. In August 2026, Abuwarda's works were featured in the program of the Sounding Jerusalem festival in Tel Aviv, Jerusalem, and Ramallah, alongside works by classical and contemporary composers.

== Performances and collaborations ==
Abuwarda's works include orchestral, chamber, and solo compositions. His piece A Distant Lament has been performed in the Old City of Jerusalem and at cultural venues in Italy.

In Europe, Abuwarda's compositions have been performed in collaboration with academic institutions and musicians. The Conservatorio di Vicenza in Italy hosted a concert featuring his works. His piano compositions, including the Nocturnes, have been recorded by Italian pianist Alberto Nones and featured on the Fazioli Pianos artist platform. In 2025, his piece Nocturne No. 2 – Notturno di Gaza premiered at the Montecassiano Music Festival in Italy, performed by Alberto Nones. Two of Abuwarda's compositions were given their world premiere recordings by Italian pianist Alberto Nones: the solo piano nocturne Stars Over the Sleeping City and the duet for cello and piano Fragments of Memory Falling.

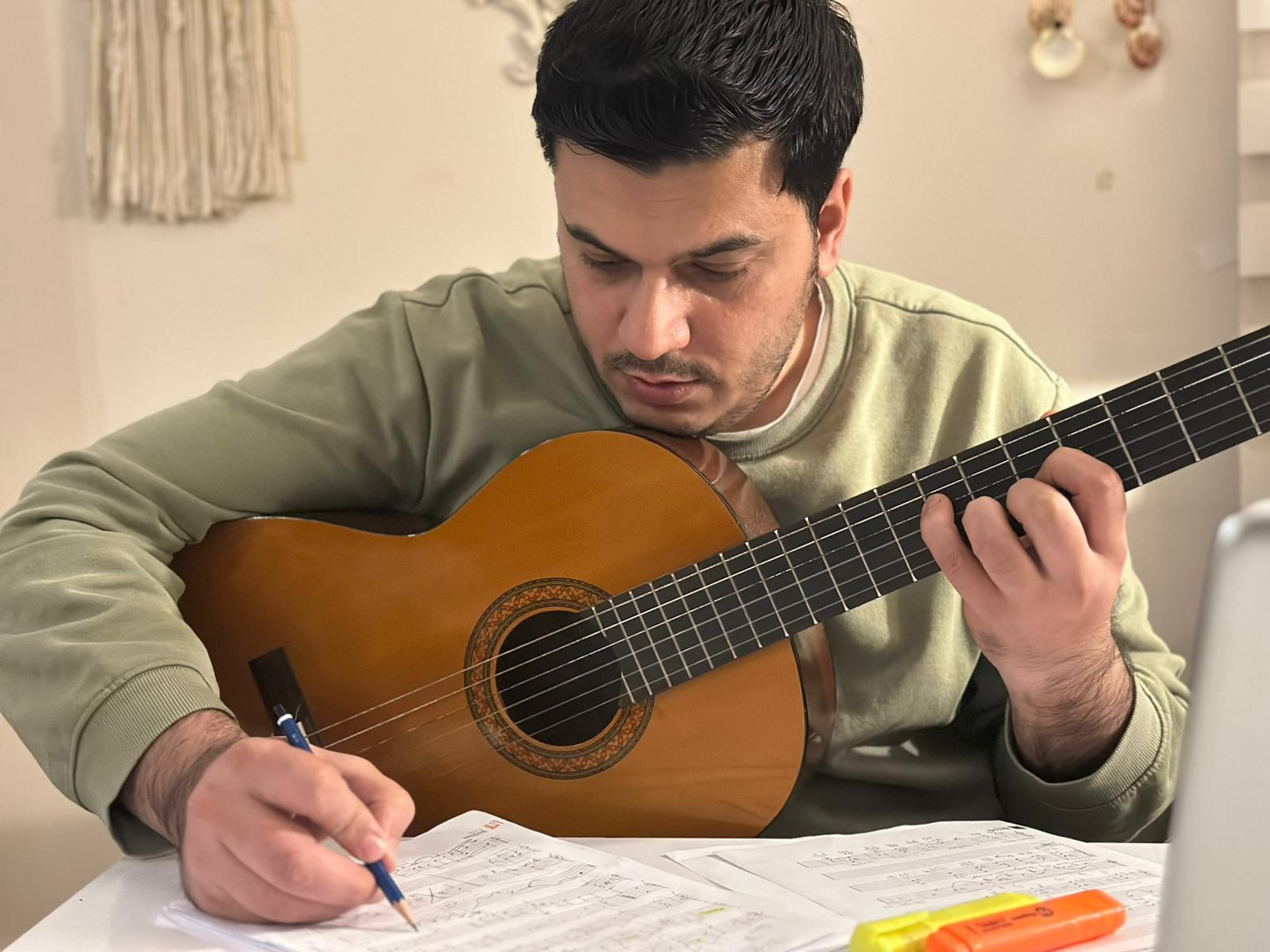
Mahmoud Abuwarda composing music

In the United Kingdom, his composition A Voice from Afar was performed by the duo Cellocroí and was covered in Buzz Magazine described the work as featuring "melancholy notes" and referred to the composer's "gratitude and enduring hope".

Abuwarda composed the music for the virtual project Sahab Museum in collaboration with the Hawaf collective. The project was featured at the Art Explora Festival.

Abuwarda is a member of the Dahaleez Collective and has contributed to sound installations presented at the OTO Sound Museum, which also includes his composition A Story to Tell in its permanent collection. His music has also been featured in cultural events in Europe related to human rights and solidarity initiatives, including the Nessun Dorma event in Italy.

Abuwarda has also actively engaged in international cultural events. He participated in "Palestine All the Time," a 24-hour continuous program hosted by Gallery TPW. Collaborating with the Palestinian collective Dahaleez, his contribution featured music and sound works designed to center and reflect on Palestinian cultural life and struggle.

In April 2026, Abuwarda collaborated with Italian pianist and musicologist Alberto Nones to compose Nocturne No. 6: Nothing or Something. The piece is dedicated to his student Lubna Alyaan, who was killed in Gaza. It was recorded in Pesaro, Italy, with participation from Italian musicians including baritone Gabriele Spina, violinist Marco Santini, and the Giardino delle Voci children's choir. The composition includes lyrics in Arabic, English, and Italian. It was scheduled for release by the Italian label Halidon Music, alongside a collection of Abuwarda's solo piano nocturnes.

== Pedagogical works ==
Abuwarda collaborated with American-Jewish piano educator Penny Lazarus on the piano collection Scenes from Palestinian Childhood. The collection was designed as an educational resource introducing students to Middle Eastern musical elements.The work includes a composition combining elements of traditional Palestinian and Jewish folk melodies.

In April 2026, the collection and Abuwarda's pedagogical approach were discussed in a bilingual (Arabic and English) article published in the MTNA e-Journal and authored by Vanessa Cornett and Salam Murtada.The article examined the collection in the context of piano instruction for children and included analyses of Abuwarda's compositions Dream of a Quiet Sky and Reflections in Turmoil.

Abuwarda has delivered guest lectures at the University of Oklahoma on world music and rhythmic structures in Middle Eastern music. His work has also been covered by European media outlets, including Italian television.

== Compositions ==
Abuwarda's musical catalog includes orchestral works, chamber music, keyboard pieces, and solo instrumental compositions. His works are registered with Broadcast Music, Inc. (BMI).

=== Orchestral ===
- A Story to Tell (2021) for strings, timpani, glockenspiel, and woodwinds
- Escape to the Light (2021) for string orchestra, clarinet, and flute
- Oracle (2021) for string orchestra

=== Chamber music ===
- Chaconne No. 1 (2021) for violin and piano
- Shattered Tent (2024) for cello and guitar
- A Voice from Afar (2025) for cello duet
- Falling into Memory (2025) for cello and piano
- Fragments of Memory Falling (2025) for cello and piano
- Nisf Hayat (2025) for clarinet and guitar
- Trio No. 1 (2025) for clarinet, cello, and piano
- Duet No. 1 (2025) for bassoon and violin

=== Vocal ===
- Nocturne No. 6: "Nothing or Something" (2026) for choir, piano, violin, and baritone

=== Keyboard ===
- Nocturne No. 1: "Last Day in Gaza" (2021) for solo piano
- Reflections in Turmoil (2024) for solo piano
- Rubble of Houses (2024) for solo piano
- Dream of a Quiet Sky (2025) for solo piano
- Nocturne No. 2: "Stars Over the Sleeping City" (2025) for solo piano
- Nocturne No. 3: "Scorched Hunger" (2025) for solo piano
- Nocturne No. 4: "The Ones Who Believed" (2025) for solo piano
- Nocturne No. 5: "Nocturne Tanguero" (2025) for solo piano

=== Solo ===
- A Distant Lament (2024) for solo cello
- Echoes of the Past (2024) for solo guitar
- Known Caller (2024) for solo cello
- Last Solo (2024) for solo guitar
- Olive Grove (2024) for solo guitar
- Fantasia on Displacement (2025) for solo guitar
- Night Thoughts (2025) for solo guitar
- Sonata Fantasia (2025) for solo cello
- The Other Side of Silence (2025) for solo guitar
- Because I'm From There (2026) for solo flute
- A Temporary Eternity (2026) for solo bassoon
- Eid, Long Ago (2026) for solo clarinet

=== Film scoring ===
- Sahab Musem (2024) for full orchestra
- (In)visible (2026) for strings orchestra

== Publications ==
- "The East Classics" 30 Arabic Songs Arranged for Classical Guitar. ISBN 9798298335423
- Scenes of a Palestinian Childhood (Five piano pieces, co-authored with Penny Lazarus).
- Harmonious Beginnings (Method for teaching music at international schools).

== Awards and recognitions ==
- 2026: Winner of the JERUS-IT-ARTS International Contest.
- 2020: The Gary Burton Berklee College of Music Scholarship.
- 2020: A.M. Qattan Foundation Scholarship in Performing Arts.
- 2016: Arab Fund for Arts and Culture (AFAC) grant for "The Arabic Songs for Classical Guitar".
