= Jaffee =

Jaffee is the surname of:

- Al Jaffee (1921–2023), American cartoonist best known for his work for Mad magazine
- Elizabeth Jaffee, American medical researcher
- Ellen Jaffee (born 1944), member of the New York State Assembly
- Irving Jaffee (1906–1981), American speed skater and double gold medalist at the 1932 Winter Olympics
- Rami Jaffee (born 1969), American keyboardist of the rock band The Wallflowers
- Sara Jaffee, American psychologist
- Susan Nirah Jaffee, American screenwriter and television producer

== See also ==
- Jaffee v. Redmond, 518 U.S. 1 (1996)
- Jaffe family
- Jaffa (disambiguation)
- Jaffe (disambiguation)
- Joffa (disambiguation)
- Joffe (disambiguation)
