= Jaffe =

יפה
- Romanization: Jaffe; Jaffee; Jaffé; Yaffe; Yaffé; Yoffe; Joffe; Yuffa; Jouffa; Joffo; Jaffa; Yafo

Origin
- Language: Hebrew
- Origin: yafe
- Meaning: beautiful, pleasant

Other names
- Variant forms: Joffe, Jaffee

Jaffe and its variant spellings Jaffé, Yaffe and Yaffé (Hebrew: יפה) are Hebrew-language surnames.

The surname was recorded in Prague in the 16th century. It was recorded in the United Kingdom in the 1881 census, mostly in London.

The Jaffe family (Hebrew: יפה) is a distinguished Ashkenazi Jewish Rabbinic family, members of which have produced numerous famous rabbis, court Jews, Talmudic scholars, scientists, businessmen, academics and politicians.

Other notable people with this surname include:

== Jaffe ==
- Aaron Jaffe (born 1930), American politician
- Allan Jaffe (1935–1987), American jazz musician
- Andrew Jaffe (1938–2010), American journalist
- Aniela Jaffé, (1903–1991), Swiss analyst who was a co-worker of Carl Jung
- Arthur Jaffe (born 1937), American mathematical physicist
- Ben Jaffe (born 1971), American jazz musician
- Bernard Jaffe (1896–1986), American chemist and historian of chemistry
- Billy Jaffe (born 1969), color analyst for the Boston Bruins on NESN
- Bracha Jaffe (born 1989), American singer
- Chapelle Jaffe, Canadian actress
- Charles Jaffe (c. 1879–1941), Belarusian-American chess master
- Charles Jaffe (conductor) (c. 1917–2011), American conductor and musical director
- Daniel Jaffe, American astronomer
- Daniel Joseph Jaffe (1809–1874), German merchant who came to Belfast in 1850 to establish a linen export business
- David Jaffe (born 1971), American video game designer and director
- David A. Jaffe (born 1955), American composer of contemporary classical and electronic/computer music
- Edgar Jaffé (1866–1921), German economist and politician
- Elaine Jaffe (born 1943), American pathologist, expert in hematopathology
- Eliezer Jaffe (1933–2017), Israeli professor
- Frederick S. Jaffe, (1925–1978), vice president of Planned Parenthood and founder of the Guttmacher Institute
- Herb Jaffe (1921–1991), American film producer
- Ina Jaffe (1948–2024), American journalist
- Irma B. Jaffe (1917–2018), American art historian, curator, and educator
- Jeffrey M. Jaffe (born 1954), computer scientist and Jewish philosopher
- Jerome Jaffe (born 1933), psychiatrist
- Louis Isaac Jaffe (1888–1950), American journalist
- Marielle Jaffe (born 1989), American model and actress
- Matt Jaffe (born 1995), American singer-songwriter
- Max Jaffa, born Max Jaffe (1911–1991), British violinist and bandleader
- Michael Jaffé (1923–1997), British art historian and curator
- Michael Jaffe (born 1945), American television producer
- Moe Jaffe (1901–1972), American songwriter and band leader
- Naomi Jaffe (born 1943), American activist
- Nat Jaffe (1918–1945), American jazz pianist
- Nicole Jaffe (born 1941), Canadian actress
- Noah Jaffe (born 2003), American Paralympic swimmer
- Norman Jaffe (1932–1993), American architect
- Otto Jaffe (1846–1929), German-born British Jewish businessman, High Sheriff and Lord Mayor of Belfast
- Peter Jaffe (1913–1982), British sailor and Olympic silver medalist
- Philipp Jaffé (1819–1870), German historian and philologist
- Philip Jaffe (1895–1980), American left-wing editor and writer
- Rivke Jaffe (born 1978), Dutch anthropologist and professor
- Robert Jaffe (physicist) (born 1946), American physicist and professor
- Robert Jaffe (stockbroker) (born 1944), American associate of Bernard Madoff
- Rona Jaffe (1931–2005), American author
- Sam Jaffe (1891–1984), American film actor
- Sam Jaffe (producer) (1901–2000), American film producer later in England
- Sarah Jaffe (born 1986), American singer-songwriter
- Scott Jaffe (born 1969), American freestyle swimmer
- Stanley R. Jaffe (1940–2025), American film producer
- Stephen Jaffe (born 1954), American composer
- Taliesin Jaffe, (born 1977), American voice actor
- Theodor Julius Jaffé (1823–1898), German actor
- Werner Jaffé (1914–2009), German chemist and university professor

== Yaffe ==
- David Yaffe (music critic) (1973–2024), American music critic
- Deborah Yaffe (born 1965), author
- Dov Yaffe (1928–2017), Lithuanian-born Israeli rabbi
- Elisha Yaffe, comedian, actor and writer
- Eyal Yaffe (born 1960), Israeli basketball player
- Leib Yaffe (1876–1948), Hebrew poet, journalist and editor
- Leo Yaffe (1916–1997), Canadian nuclear chemistry scientist
- Martin Yaffe (born 1942), American philosopher
- Maurice Yaffé (1944/45–1989), British psychologist
- Michael B. Yaffe, American scientist, professor, surgeon and retired colonel
- Richard Yaffe (1903–1986), journalist

== See also ==
- Jaffee
- Joffe
- Yoffe
- Ioffe
