= Joffe =

יפה, יאָפע
- Romanization: Jaffe; Jaffé; Yaffe; Ioffe; Joffe; Yuffa; Jouffa

Origin
- Language: Hebrew
- Origin: yafe
- Derivation: Jaffe
- Meaning: beautiful

Joffe (Joffé, Иоффе, Ioffe, Yoffe) is a Hebrew-language surname, a variant of Jaffe. Notable people with this surname include:

- Abraham Z. Joffe, Soviet and then Israeli mycologist
- Abram Fedorovich Ioffe, Russian physicist
- Adolph Joffe (Adolf Joffe), Russian Marxist revolutionary and Soviet politician
- Avraham Yoffe, Israeli general and politician
- Boris Yoffe (born 1968), Russian-born Israeli composer
- Carole Joffe, American sociologist and reproductive rights advocate
- Chantal Joffe, English painter
- Charles H. Joffe, American film producer
- Dina Joffe (born 1952), Latvian pianist, Israeli citizen
- Emily Yoffe, American journalist
- Inna Yoffe (born 1988), Israeli Olympic synchronized swimmer
- Jasper Joffe, British contemporary artist and novelist
- Joel Joffe, Lord Joffe, British life peer, former head of Oxfam, former lawyer to Nelson Mandela
- Josef Joffe, German and American journalist and international studies scholar
- Julia Ioffe, Russian-American journalist and blogger
- Manne Joffe, Swedish chess master
- Mark Joffe, Australian film director
- Mordecai Yoffe, East European rabbi and Judaism scholar
- Nadezhda Joffe, Soviet Trotskyist
- Natalie Yoffe, Uruguayan model and television personality
- Rodney Joffe, internet entrepreneur and an internet data expert
- Roland Joffé, English-French film director
- Yudl Yoffe, Yiddish writer, translator and sculptor

== See also ==
- Jaffe family
- Jaffa (disambiguation)
- Jaffee
- Joffa (disambiguation)
- Yoffie
