= Janeite =

Culture of adoring Jane Austen

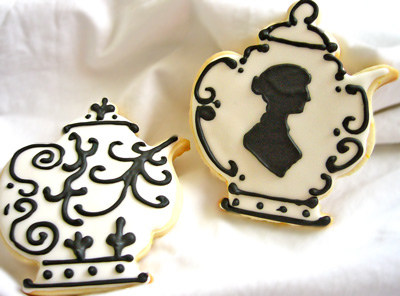
Jane Austen teapot cookies

The term Janeite has been both embraced by devotees of the works of Jane Austen and used as a term of opprobrium. According to Austen scholar Claudia Johnson Janeitism is "the self-consciously idolatrous enthusiasm for 'Jane' and every detail relative to her".

== History ==
Janeitism did not begin until after the publication of J. E. Austen-Leigh's A Memoir of Jane Austen in 1870, when the literary elite felt that they had to separate their appreciation of Austen from that of the masses. The term Janeite was originally coined by the literary scholar George Saintsbury in his 1894 introduction to a new edition of Pride and Prejudice. As Austen scholar Deidre Lynch explains, "he meant to equip himself with a badge of honor he could jubilantly pin to his own lapel". It has been said that the early twentieth century, Janeitism was "principally a male enthusiasm shared among publishers, professors, and literati". Rudyard Kipling even published a short story entitled "The Janeites" about a group of World War I soldiers who were secretly fans of Austen's novels. There were, however, late nineteenth and early twentieth-century female devotees of Austen, especially in the New Woman movement and among women's suffrage activists.

During the 1930s and 1940s, when Austen's works were canonised and accepted as worthy of academic study, the term began to change meaning. It was used to signify those who appreciated Austen in the "wrong" way and the term, according to Lynch, began to be "used almost exclusively about and against other people" (emphasis in original). This is no longer necessarily the case, as Austen appreciators have reclaimed the term in books and on social media.

== Present day ==
Modern Janeites are described by their most fervent detractors in the same tones as Trekkies; academically speaking, the Janeite phenomenon can be seen as the first "subculture" with all the attendant aspects, including pejorative but also positive. Johnson noted Janeites are "derided and marginalized by dominant cultural institutions bent on legitimizing their own objects and protocols of expertise". However, though academics dismiss the Janeites as the literary equivalent to Trekkies, there is a difference in that Austen's works are considered to be high culture unlike Star Trek. It remains a popular interest however, with publication of such recent books as 2013's Among the Janeites: A Journey through the World of Jane Austen Fandom and Global Jane Austen: Pleasure, Passion, and Possessiveness in the Jane Austen Community.

At the same time, Austen remains a topic of serious academic inquiry at top global universities in a way to which very recent subcultures are only just beginning to aspire. The male Janeites have often been attacked as unmanly. For an example, the British scholar H. W. Garrod delivered "A Depreciation of Jane Austen" before the Royal Society for Literature in May 1928, which Johnson called extremely misogynistic and homophobic, as he attacked Austen as a writer for no other reason than she was a woman, whose male characters were all "soft", and contemptuously stated that any man who liked Austen was effeminate and not a real man at all. Johnson argued that attacks such as Garrod's on the Janeites might help explain why the Janeites were once wrongly understood to be predominately female.

Scholars such as Johnson and Lynch study "the ludic enthusiasm of [the] amateur reading clubs, whose 'performances' include teas, costume balls, games, readings, and dramatic representations, staged with a campy anglophilia in North America, and a brisker antiquarian meticulousness in England, and whose interests range from Austenian dramatizations, to fabrics, to genealogies, and to weekend study trips". Lynch has described committed Janeites as members of a cult, comparing their travels to places Austen lived or places described in her novels or their adaptations as pilgrimages, for example. She argues that such activities provide "a kind of time-travel to the past, because they preserve an all but vanished Englishness or set of 'traditional' values....This may demonstrate the influence of a sentimental account of Austen's novels that presents them as means by which readers might go home again – to a comfortable, soothingly normal world." More recently, scholars have been less dismissive of the cultural importance, rich history, and social power of literary fandoms, including Austen's.

== Bibliography ==
- Johnson, Claudia L. "Austen cults and cultures". The Cambridge Companion to Jane Austen. Eds. Edward Copeland and Juliet McMaster. Cambridge: Cambridge University Press, 1997. ISBN 0-521-49867-8.
- Looser, Devoney. The Making of Jane Austen. Baltimore, MD: Johns Hopkins University Press, 2017 ISBN 1421422824
- Luetkenhaus, Holly and Zoe Weinstein. Austentatious: The Evolving World of Jane Austen Fans. Iowa City: University of Iowa Press, 2019. ISBN 978-1-60938-639-9
- Lynch, Deidre. "Cult of Jane Austen". Jane Austen In Context. Ed. Janet Todd. Cambridge: Cambridge University Press, 2005. ISBN 0-521-82644-6.
- Lynch, Deidre. "Introduction: Sharing with Our Neighbors". Janeites: Austen's Disciples and Devotees. Ed. Deidre Lynch. Princeton: Princeton University Press, 2000. ISBN 0-691-05005-8.
- Lynch, Deidre. "Sequels". Jane Austen In Context. Ed. Janet Todd. Cambridge: Cambridge University Press, 2005. ISBN 0-521-82644-6.
- MacDonald, Gina and Andrew MacDonald, eds. Jane Austen on Screen. Cambridge: Cambridge University Press, 2003. ISBN 978-0-521-79728-3

== See also ==
- The Jane Austen Club - 2007 film based on the book by Karen Joy Fowler
- Bibliophilia
- https://jasna.org/ - website of the Jane Austen Society of North America
