= Sonja Hegasy =

Sonja Hegasy is a German academic who is the guest professor for Postcolonial Studies at the Barenboim-Said Akademie (2019-2021), a private music academy in Berlin. Since 2008, she is Vice Director of the Leibniz-Zentrum Moderner Orient (ZMO). She studied Arabic and Islamic Studies at the American University in Cairo, the Universities of Witten/Herdecke and Bochum, graduating from Columbia University in 1990 with a thesis on Violent Narratives – Narrative Violence. Her PhD on State, Public Sphere and Civil Society in Morocco was published in German in 1996. Her research and publications focus on modern Arab intellectual thought, civil society and social mobilisation, as well as the politics of memory in post-conflict societies. Sonja Hegasy has been active in introducing the work of contemporary Moroccan philosopher Mohamed Abed al-Jabiri in Germany. In 2016, she was a Fulbright Fellow at the City University of New York. She holds numerous honorary positions on academic advisory councils, including chairing the Advisory Board for Science and Current Affairs of the Goethe-Institut in Munich from 2009 to 2016, and being a member of the Trajectories of Change program at the ZEIT-Stiftung.

== Publications ==
- »Der Text liest den Leser.« Apropos Mohammed Abed Al-Jabri, 1935–2010. In: polylog. Forum für interkulturelles Philosophieren e.V., Wiener Gesellschaft für interkulturelle Philosophie (Hrsg.), Heft Nr. 44, 2021, 129-136.
- »Kann der Kapitalismus – oder der Imperialismus – sich in eine humanistische Bewegung transformieren? Das bezweifle ich!« Mohammed Abed Al-Jabri im Interview mit Sonja Hegasy. Casablanca 6. Mai 1993. In: polylog. Forum für interkulturelles Philosophieren e.V., Heft Nr. 44, 2021, 137-149.
- Guest Co-Editor Memories of Violence, Social Life and Political Culture in the Maghreb and Mashreq, Memory Studies, Special Issue, 12.3, June 2019. (with N.S. Nikro)
- Dare to be wise! On the Reception of Mohammed Abed al-Jabri Post-2011. In: F. Corrao, Z. Eyadat, M. Hashas (eds) Islam, State, and Modernity: Mohammed Abed Al Jabri and the Future of the Arab World. New York: Palgrave, 2018, 183-204.
- Co-Editor The Social Life of Memory: Violence, Trauma, and Testimony in Lebanon and Morocco. New York: Palgrave, 2017. (with N.S. Nikro)
- Letter to Oneself. Acknowledging Guilt in Post-war Lebanon. In: Karine Deslandes, Fabrice Mourlon, Bruno Tribout (eds) Civil War and Narrative. Testimony, Historiography, Memory. New York: Palgrave, 2017, 39-57.
- Co-Editor Herausforderungen in arabischen Staaten. Die Friedrich-Ebert-Stiftung im Nahen Osten und in Nordafrika. Bonn: Dietz-Verlag, 2016. (with V. Vinnai, S. Faath, A. Vogt)
- Co-Editor Gendered Memory in the Middle East and North Africa: Cultural Norms, Social Practices, and Transnational Regimes. Special Issue of the Journal for Middle Eastern Women Studies (JMEWS). Vol. 8, 2012, No. 1. (with B. Dennerlein)
- Young Authority: Quantitative and Qualitative Insights into Youth, Youth Culture, and State Power in Contemporary Morocco. In: The Journal of North African Studies, Volume 12, Issue 1 March 2007, (S. 19–36).
- Changing Values among Youth. Examples from the Arab World and Germany (ed. with Elke Kaschl), Berlin: ZMO-Studien, 2007
- Staat, Öffentlichkeit und Zivilgesellschaft in Marokko: Die Potentiale der sozio-kulturellen Opposition (Politik, Wirtschaft und Gesellschaft des Vorderen Orients) ISBN 3-89173-045-4

== Essays ==
- Palestine Isn’t Just Another Country. A German-Egyptian Memory of Edward Saiʿd. Berlinbazzar, January 2021.
- »I did not forgive him. But after many years, I allowed myself to accept his apology.« A Report on the Conference Circumstances from Post-Apartheid South Africa. In: Muslim Worlds–World of Islam? New Directions in Research. Berlin, 46-49.
- Die Bedeutung von Geschichtsbildern und Geschichtswissenschaft in Gesellschaften der arabischen Welt von heute. VHD Journal Themenheft Geschichte - Politik - Gesellschaft. Wie politisch ist Erinnerung? Heft 7, Juli 2018, 23-27.
- Islam und Philosophie in der nahöstlichen Moderne, Review Anke von Kügelgen (ed.): Wissenschaft, Philosophie und Religion. Religionskritische Positionen um 1900’. Qantara.de, 22.9.2017.
