= Ioffe (disambiguation) =

Ioffe is a Jewish surname.

Ioffe may also refer to:

- Akademik Ioffe, Soviet/Russian research vessel
- 5222 Ioffe, main-belt asteroid
- Ioffe (crater), Moon crater
- Ioffe Institute, Russia
