= Yafa =

Yafa can refer to:

== Places ==
- Jaffa, the ancient Levantine port city proximate with Jaffo, Israel
- Yafa an-Naseriyye, an Arab town in Israel
- Yafa'a District, in Yemen

== People ==
- Yafa', a tribe in Yemen
- Yafa Yarkoni, an Israeli singer

== See also ==
- Yafai
- Jaffa (disambiguation)
