= Edward Said National Conservatory of Music =

Palestinian institution for musical education

Coordinates: 31.9701°N 35.2011°E

- Children at the Edward Said National Conservatory of Music, July 2012
- West Bank, Gaza Strip, Palestine

Information
- Established: 1993
- Website: ncm.birzeit.edu

The Edward Said National Conservatory of Music (Arabic: معهد ادوارد سعيد الوطني للموسيقى Ma`had Edward Sa`īd al-Waṭaniy lil-Musīqā) is a Palestinian music conservatory with branches in Ramallah, East Jerusalem, Bethlehem, Nablus and Gaza City. In total, there are more than 1,000 students. It was established in 1993 as The National Conservatory of Music, with its first branch in Ramallah, opening in October of that year.

In September 2004, the name of the conservatory was changed to The Edward Said National Conservatory of Music in honor of the Palestinian music critic and intellectual Edward Said, the accomplished classical pianist and scholar of international studies, and a founder and benefactor of music for east–west dialogue (see the West-Eastern Divan Orchestra and Barenboim-Said Akademie).

== Orchestras and ensembles ==
The ESNCM administrates the Palestine Youth Orchestra and the Palestine National Orchestra, in addition to a number smaller projects. The recently formed Palestine Strings ensemble performed with Nigel Kennedy in 2012, and toured the US in 2011. Its youth orchestra - the PYO - has performed in Palestine, Italy, Jordan, Greece, Bahrain, Germany, Syria and Lebanon. It enjoys the support of international partner institutions including the Oslo Philharmonic Orchestra. The ESNCM's professional orchestra - the PNO - formed in December 2010, has performed in Palestine, Jordan and Indonesia. Both orchestras have an agenda of promoting music by living Arab composers. The ESNCM Orchestra, the only Palestinian symphony orchestra performing in Palestine today where all the musicians are drawn from the local communities, promotes concerts throughout the year in the main Palestinian towns and cities. It performs an eclectic mix of film western classical music, opera, arrangements of Arabic music, and film music. The ESNCM has several resident Arabic music ensembles, student and professional, which have toured throughout the world, and its students have taken part in collaborative projects with well-known international musicians.

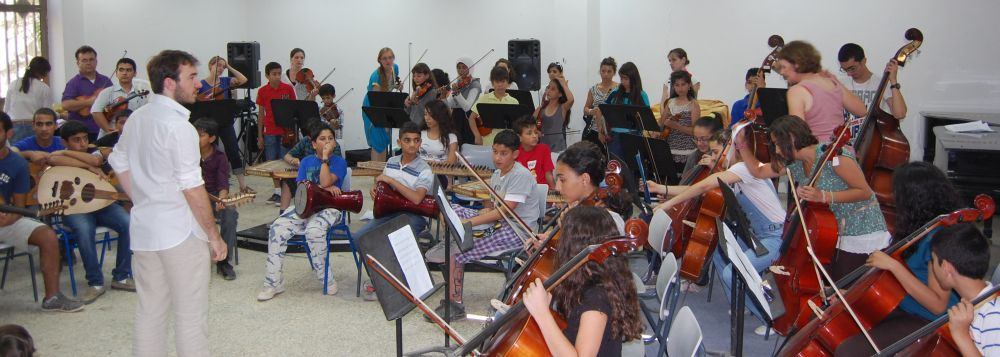
Edward Said National Conservatory of Music; July 2012

== Festivals and concerts ==
In addition to administrating two major festivals, the ESNCM promotes concerts of Arabic, western classical, and jazz music throughout Palestine at all times of year. It is responsible for the annual Arabic music Layali Tarab fi Quds al Arab festival, and the mainly classical Jasmine Festival.

== Background ==
In 1990, five Palestinian musicians and music teachers conducted a study on the status of music in Palestine upon a request by the Welfare Association. The preliminary findings of the study convinced the team that there was an urgent need to establish a music school to fill the huge gap in music education within the Palestinian society. In 1993, after three years of concerted efforts by these musicians, and with the support and encouragement of friends, foremost amongst whom were Edward Karkar, Munther Nabulsi, Huda Khoury and Linda Khalil Khoury, the conservatory was launched as the National Conservatory of Music, falling under the umbrella of the Board of Trustees of Birzeit University, who offered the Conservatory premises in the University Board building in Ramallah and appointed the following founders to the Supervisory Board at the Conservatory: Salwa Tabri, Rima Tarazi, Amin Nasser, Nadia Abboushi and Suhail Khoury.

In October of that year, the first branch of the Conservatory opened in Ramallah. There were 40 students, three part-time teachers, a secretary, and a volunteer director – one of the co-founders, Amin Nasser. A few years later, the Conservatory opened two other branches in Jerusalem and Bethlehem. And in summer of 2010 the launch of Nablus branch. In September 2004, as a tribute to the late Edward Said, an honorary member of the Board, the name of the Conservatory was changed to The Edward Said National Conservatory of Music.

== Branches ==
The branche of East Jetusalem

There are five branches of the ESNCM, located in East Jerusalem, Ramallah, Bethlehem, Nablus and Gaza City (inaugurated in 2012), with over 1,000 students altogether. Each Branch has its own academic director and administrative manager who handle the day-to-day running of their schools. This setup makes room for the future opening of new branches on one hand, and on the other hand, it guarantees the same level of education and services to the students and community in whichever city the ESNCM has or opens a branch.

The buildings and equipment of the Gazan antenna were completely destroyed by Israeli bombs during the war in Gaza that began in 2023. Classes are now held in refugee camp tents. Music teachers of the Institute found Gaza Birds Singing, a musical group made up of displaced Palestinian children. In 2026, they release The Drone Song, performed to the buzz of Israeli military drones overhead and that become viral.

== Academic programs ==
Students of the Edward Said National Conservatory of Music

The ESNCM offers two programs of study - the regular and the amateur program.

"The Regular Program"

The music program of study at the ESNCM has been designed to give regular students a broadly structured instrumental and theoretical musical education. It consists of three levels:

1. The Preparatory level. This is not a mandatory level.
1. The Elementary level.
1. The Intermediate level.

After completing the three levels successfully, students will be eligible for a diploma that will qualify them to the university level program at the ESNCM (not open yet), which will train them to become professional musicians.

=== The Regular Program ===
consists of training in a Western or Arabic instrument, with examinations in 8 grades, each of which can be completed in a maximum of 20 months. It also includes theory, ear training, and history and appreciation of Arabic, classical, jazz and world music. The program also emphasizes group playing, choirs and group Arabic percussion.

=== The Amateur Program ===
Private lessons are also offered to amateurs and music lovers without having to comply with the regular curriculum or to sit for exams. In some cases amateur students may register for other group courses subject to the approval of the teacher of the course, and provided that the student is at a level at which he/she could benefit from it. Students in the amateur program do not get credit or certificates for classes and courses that they have attended.
