= Jaffa (disambiguation) =

Jaffa is part of the city of Tel Aviv in Israel.

Jaffa (or sometimes Jafa and other transliterations from Hebrew or Arabic) may also refer to:

== Arts ==
- Jaffa (2009 film), an Israeli drama directed by Keren Yedaya
- Jaffa (2013 film), a Telugu black comedy written and directed by Vennela Kishore
- Jaffa (Stargate), a fictional race in the military sci-fi television series
- Jaffa Phonix, a Palestinian band

== Food and drink ==
- Jaffa (soft drink), popular in Finland
- Jaffa Cakes, a snack popular in the UK
- Jaffa Crvenka, a Serbian confectionery company
- Jaffa orange, a variety of orange originating in Palestine
- Jaffas, a confectionery popular in Australia and New Zealand

== People ==
- Harry V. Jaffa (1918–2015), American academic
- Max Jaffa (1911–1991), British violinist
- Jaffa Lam (born 1973), Hong Kong visual artist
- Brahmanandam, Indian actor and comedian, nicknamed Jaffa

== Places ==
=== Australia ===
- Jaffa, Queensland, a locality in the Cassowary Coast Region
- Cape Jaffa, a headland in South Australia
- Cape Jaffa Lighthouse, in South Australia

=== North America ===
- Jaffa, Ontario, a town in Canada
- Jaffa Shrine Center, an arena in Pennsylvania, US

=== Western Asia ===
- County of Jaffa and Ascalon in the Crusader state Kingdom of Jerusalem

==== Jerusalem ====
- Jaffa Gate, one of the seven main open Gates of the Old City of Jerusalem
- Jaffa Road, one of the longest and oldest major streets in Jerusalem
- Jaffa Gate Mill, a windmill

==== Tel Aviv ====
- Old Jaffa, the historical part of Jaffa
- Jaffa Port, an ancient port on the Mediterranean Sea
- Jaffa Clock Tower
- Jaffa Light, a lighthouse
- Jaffa Railway Station

==== Galilee ====
- Yafa an-Naseriyye, or Jaffa of Nazareth

== War and diplomacy ==
- Battle of Jaffa (1192), crusader battle with Richard the Lionhart
- Battle of Jaffa (1917), World War One battle between forces of the British Empire and Ottoman Empire
- Siege of Jaffa, by Napoleon against the Ottomans
- Treaty of Jaffa (disambiguation), between the Crusaders and the Saracens

== Other uses ==
- Jafa, occasionally "Jaffa", a derogatory term in New Zealand for an Aucklander
- Jaffa (cricket), an exceptionally well bowled delivery
- The Jaffa Institute, an Israeli social services agency

== See also ==
- Jaffe (disambiguation)
- Yafa (disambiguation)
