= Ioffe =

Ioffe is a Jewish surname. Notable people with the surname include:

- Abram Ioffe (1880–1960), Ukraine-born Soviet physicist
- Adolph Joffe or Ioffe (1883–1927), Soviet diplomat
- Dmitry Ioffe (1963–2020), Israeli mathematician
- Grigory Ioffe (born 1951), American geographer
- Julia Ioffe (born 1982), Russian-born American journalist
- Mikhail Ioffe (1917–1996), Soviet/Russian physicist
- Yuliy Ioffe (born 1940), Ukrainian politician

== See also ==
- Jaffe family
- Joffe
- Jaffe
- Yoffe
- Yaffe
