= Yoffie =

Yoffie is a surname. Notable people with the surname include:

- David B. Yoffie, American academic
- Eric Yoffie (born 1947), American rabbi
- Leah Rachel Yoffie (1883–1956), American writer, educator, and folklorist

== See also ==
- Joffe
- Jaffe family
