= Ataaba =

Traditional Arabic musical form

The ataaba (Arabic: عتابا, meaning "plaint" or "dirge", also transliterated 'ataba) is a traditional Arabic musical form sung at weddings, festivals, and other occasions. Popular in the Middle East, it was originally a Bedouin genre, improvised by a solo poet-singer accompanying themselves on the rababa. As part of Arab tradition, ataabas are generally performed by a vocal soloist, without instrumental accompaniment, who improvises the melody using folk poetry for the verse.

Sung unmetered in stanzas comprising four lines, the last word of the first three lines are homonyms, each with a different meaning, creating a pun. In urban settings, the ataaba is often paired with a metric choral refrain called a mījanā.

The ataaba is also used to express grief or reproach. The most common theme of an ataaba is love, though eulogies are also common. Less common themes include moral instruction, and descriptions of nature.

== Structure ==
About half of all ataabas do not use fixed meter, while the other half use a standard rajaz or wāfir meter. Generally composed of four verses of poetry, the first three end with the same sound. The end of a verse or quatrain in an ataaba is marked by adding a word ending in "-ba" to the end of the fourth hemistich. The fourth and final verse usually ends with a word ending in the sound aab or awa.

While there are four lines of verse in an ataaba, these are usually sung as two musical phrases. These phrases are often a melodic curve beginning on the fourth or fifth, descending to the cadence and ending on the supertonic or tonic. All ataabas are performed by a soloist, who often begins by singing a long melismatic phrase on the syllable ōf. While this opening sequence is not necessarily a part of the ataaba, the closing melismatic phrase sung to words such as yā bā ("O father"), yā mā ("O mother"), or yā eyn ("O eyes"), etc., is an integral part of the song's structure and is unique to this musical form.

== Performances ==
The ataaba is one of many Palestinian folk music traditions that continues to be performed at weddings and festivals in Palestine, as well as by Palestinians in the West Bank and Gaza Strip. The ataaba and other forms of improvised poetry such as the mawwal and mijana have been used by Palestinians since the 1960s, "to express outrage and grief at the razing and appropriation of Palestinian villages by Israelis." Ataabas are also performed by famous Arab singers, such as the Lebanese singer and composer, Wadi' al-Safi.

== See also ==
- Anasheed

== Bibliography ==
- Armitage, Susan Hodge; Hart, Patricia; Weathermon, Karen (2002), Women's Oral History: The Frontiers Reader, University of Nebraska Press, ISBN 978-0-8032-5944-7
- Cohen, Dalia; Katz, Ruth (2006), Palestinian Arab Music: A Maqām Tradition in Practice, University of Chicago Press, ISBN 978-0-226-11299-2
- Farsoun, Samih K. (2004), Culture and Customs of the Palestinians, Greenwood Publishing Group, ISBN 978-0-313-32051-4
- Palva, Heikki; Harviainen, Tapani; Parpola, Asko; Halén, Harry (1995), Dialectologia Arabica: A Collection of Articles in Honour of the Sixtieth Birthday of Professor Heikki Palva, Finnish Oriental Society, ISBN 978-951-9380-25-4
- Kaschl, Elke (2003), Dance and Authenticity in Israel and Palestine: Performing the Nation, Brill, ISBN 978-90-04-13238-2
- World and Its Peoples: Middle East, Western Asia, and Northern Africa, Marshall Cavendish Reference, 2007, ISBN 978-0-7614-7571-2
- Shiloah, Amnon (1997), The Performance of Jewish and Arab Music in Israel Today: A Special Issue of the Journal Musical Performance, Taylor & Francis, ISBN 978-90-5702064-3
