= West–Eastern Divan Orchestra =

Orchestra based in Seville, Spain

West-Eastern Divan Orchestra
- Orchestra
- Founded: 1999
- Location: Seville, Spain
- Website: west-eastern-divan.org

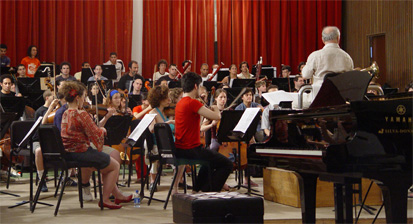
Rehearsal under the direction of Daniel Barenboim, in Pilas, Spain, on 25 July 2005

The West–Eastern Divan Orchestra is based in Seville, Spain, and consists of musicians from countries across the Hispanophone world and the Middle East—of Egyptian, Iranian, Israeli, Jordanian, Lebanese, Palestinian, Syrian, and Hispanic background.

It was jointly founded in 1999 by Argentine-Israeli conductor Daniel Barenboim and Palestinian-American academic Edward Said, who named the Orchestra and workshop after West-östlicher Divan, an anthology of poems written by the German polymath Johann Wolfgang von Goethe - a central work for the development of the concept of world culture.

In 2015, Argentine pianist Martha Argerich, as Barenboim's long term performing musical partner, was designated as an honorary member of the Divan Orchestra.

In 2016, the Barenboim–Said Akademie was established in Berlin, Germany, as a state-accredited music conservatory offering Bachelors of Music and Artist Diplomas. The Akademie, for which Barenboim serves as president, is based on the founding aims of the West–Eastern Divan Orchestra.

== History ==
=== Establishment ===
In 1999, Barenboim and Said, who had become friends in the early 1990s, founded the West—Eastern Divan Orchestra in order to foment a feeling of sympathy and co-existence, chiefly between Arabs and Israelis, through Middle Eastern musical ensembles. Shortly after it was founded, the first workshop was opened in Weimar, Germany, after the organization had received over 200 applications from Arab music students. Barenboim has also expressed interest in musicians from Iran, allocating three chairs for Iranian musicians to play in the orchestra each year; though Iran is not an Arab country and therefore has not been a belligerent in the Arab–Israeli conflict, that particular environment exists in light of the Iran–Israel proxy conflict, which began a few years after Iran's Islamic Revolution in 1979.

In 2016, Ban Ki-moon, the erstwhile United Nations Secretary-General, designated the West–Eastern Divan Orchestra as a United Nations Global Advocate for Cultural Understanding, praising the organization's push for peace and unity, particularly between Israelis and Palestinians.

=== Performances ===
Since 2011, the West–Eastern Divan Orchestra has participated in an annual concert at the Waldbühne in Berlin, Germany.

On 11 July 2012, in the presence of Italian president Giorgio Napolitano and his wife Clio Maria Bittoni, Barenboim led the West–Eastern Divan Orchestra's performance for Pope Benedict XVI in the courtyard of the Apostolic Palace of Castel Gandolfo. The event commemorated the Christian feast day of the 6th-century Italian monk Benedict of Nursia (the abbot who founded the Benedictines), and thus the Pope's name day.

A few days after the performance for Benedict XVI, Barenboim conducted the Orchestra's performance of the complete symphonic cycle of Ludwig van Beethoven at the BBC Proms in London, England, marking the first time that all nine symphonies were performed under a single conductor in a single Prom season since English conductor Henry Wood did so in 1942.

In September–November 2012, the West–Eastern Divan Orchestra participated in the 9th Gwangju Biennale (ROUNDTABLE), held in Gwangju, South Korea.

In May 2022, the orchestra opened the prestigious Prague Spring Festival with two concerts of Bedřich Smetana's tone poem Má vlast (My Country). The originally scheduled conductor, Mo Daniel Barenboim, was replaced by conductor Thomas Guggeis due to illness.

== Purpose ==
The West–Eastern Divan Orchestra was founded to effectively promote understanding between Israelis and Palestinians and pave the way for a peaceful and fair resolution of the Arab–Israeli conflict and the Israeli–Palestinian conflict. Barenboim himself has spoken of the ensemble as follows:

"The Divan is not a love story, and it is not a peace story. It has very flatteringly been described as a project for peace. It isn't. It's not going to bring peace, whether you play well or not so well. The Divan was conceived as a project against ignorance. A project against the fact that it is absolutely essential for people to get to know the other, to understand what the other thinks and feels, without necessarily agreeing with it. I'm not trying to convert the Arab members of the Divan to the Israeli point of view, and [I'm] not trying to convince the Israelis to the Arab point of view. But I want to—and unfortunately I am alone in this now that Edward died a few years ago—create a platform where the two sides can disagree and not resort to knives."

One of the organization's young Israeli musicians reinforced this point:

"Barenboim is always saying his project is not political. But one of the really great things is that this is a political statement by both sides. It is more important not for people like myself, but for people to see that it is possible to sit down with Arab people and play. The orchestra is a human laboratory that can express to the whole world how to cope with the other."

== Andalucía ==
The orchestra has performed around the world. It has an annual summer school in Seville. Since 2002, the Junta de Andalucía (Regional Government of Andalusia) and a private foundation have provided a base for the ensemble in Seville, Spain. Young musicians from Spain now also take part in the orchestra.

The West–Eastern Divan Workshop takes place during several weeks each summer in Andalucía. Once the working period is over, the concert tour of the West–Eastern Divan Orchestra starts. The orchestra has been awarded several prizes since its creation, among them the Príncipe de Asturias concord award in 2002 for Said and Barenboim, and the Premium Imperiale awarded by the Japan Arts Association.

In 2004, the Barenboim–Said Foundation, based in Seville and financed by the Junta de Andalucía was established with the purpose of developing several education through music projects based on the principles of coexistence and dialogue promoted by Said and Barenboim. In addition to managing the orchestra, the Barenboim–Said Foundation assists with other projects such as the Academy of Orchestral Studies, the Musical Education in Palestine project and the Early Childhood Musical Education Project in Seville.

== In popular culture ==
A film by Paul Smaczny about the orchestra, Knowledge is the Beginning, won the Emmy Award for best documentary related to arts of 2006. In 2007, the orchestra received the Praemium Imperiale Grant for Young Artists. It has recorded for the Teldec label. The current concertmaster is Michael Barenboim, the son of Daniel Barenboim.

== See also ==
- Barenboim–Said Akademie
- Edward Said National Conservatory of Music
- Middle Eastern music
  - Jewish music
    - Music of Israel
  - Arab music
    - Music of Palestine
