= Treaty of Jaffa =

Treaty of Jaffa may refer to:

- Treaty of Jaffa (1192), ended the Third Crusade
- Treaty of Jaffa (1229), ended the Sixth Crusade
