= Salam Murtada =

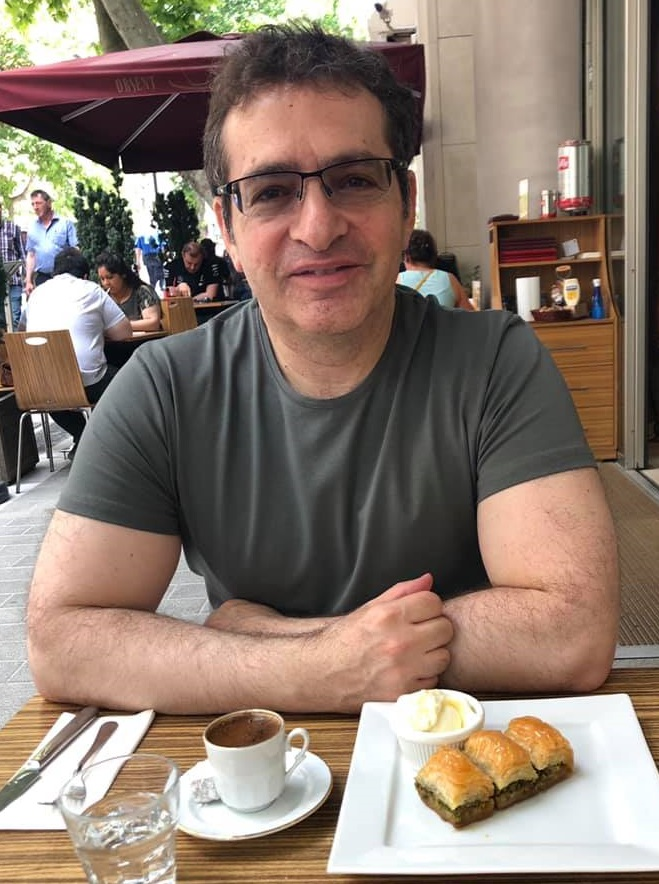
Salam Murtada in İstanbul, Türkiye in 2019

Salam Murtada (Arabic: سلام مرتضى) (born Salam Muwaffaq Abdel-Majid Hussein Murtada on March 3, 1967) is a Jordanian-American pianist and composer of contemporary classical music.

== Early life ==
Salam Murtada was born in Amman, in the Hashemite Kingdom of Jordan, to Muwaffaq Murtada (1938–2015), Deputy Director General of Civil Aviation of Jordan, and Lebanese pianist Maysoon Ghorayeb (1940–1979). His mother attended the Lebanese National Higher Conservatory of Music in Beirut as a young adult, studying piano under Diana Takieddine. Salam's mother served as his first piano teacher. The family lived primarily in Amman, but also resided briefly in Lyon, Los Angeles, and in Beirut during the Lebanese Civil War. On June 30, 1973, Salam and his family survived the crash of Aeroflot Flight 512, a Tupolev 134A passenger plane, in Amman. Salam's mother died when she was 39 and he was 12. He said, "I coped with my mother's death by practicing a lot of music, and I realized how much music improved me emotionally. I also saw that, like science, art seeks truth. In science you look on the outside for empirical evidence. In art, you look inside your soul."

Salam continued to study piano with Samia Abu-Khader Ghannoum in Amman. He attended high school at the Terra Santa College of Amman and graduated with a General Certificate of Education (GCE). At age 16, he moved to the United States to attend college. He attended the University of Texas at Austin, studying piano with Lita Guerra in the Butler School of Music and engineering at the Cockrell School of Engineering. Obliged to choose between music and engineering degree programs, he chose the latter. He graduated with dual degrees in Architectural Engineering and Petroleum Engineering. He attended West Virginia University for graduate school, studying piano with Christine Kefferstan, and earning an M.S. in Petroleum and Natural Gas Engineering and an M.S. in Civil and Environmental Engineering.

== Career ==
Salam is an environmental engineer and hydrologist who performs and composes music. He has discussed both the challenges and the freedoms of pursuing music as a non-career musician. He worked as an environmental engineer at the North Carolina Department of Environmental and Natural Resources (now the North Carolina Department of Environmental Quality) until 2008. He is currently a floodplain hydrologist for the Minnesota Department of Natural Resources. He is a licensed Professional Engineer (PE), Professional Hydrologist (PH) and a Certified Floodplain Manager (CFM). He currently serves as the President of the American Institute of Hydrology.

After college, Salam continued his study of piano with John Ruggero in Raleigh, North Carolina, and was coached and mentored by concert artist Walter Hautzig. He is currently coached by Vanessa Cornett, and has performed in master classes for Russell Sherman, Michelle Cann, and Walter Hautzig. He studied composition briefly with James Callahan at the University of St. Thomas in St. Paul, Minnesota. As a classical performer, he was a semi-finalist in the Fourth Van Cliburn International Competition for Outstanding Amateurs (2004), a semi-finalist in the Washington International Piano Arts Council competition (2006), and a prize winner in the Greensboro Music Academy (now the Music Academy of North Carolina) National Piano Competition (2000). A winner of the Masters Concerto and Aria Competition in 2019, he performed Beethoven's Piano Concerto No. 4 with the Kenwood Symphony Orchestra under the baton of Yuri Ivan.

His perspective as a musician and engineer has been featured on WDAV 89.9 FM radio (Charlotte, NC), The Dallas Morning News, Fort Worth Star-Telegram, the London Times, and BBC Radio. His experience with performance anxiety was featured in the book The Mindful Musician: Mental Skills for Peak Performance (Oxford University Press). He currently lives in the Twin Cities, Minnesota.

== Works ==
Salam's compositional style explores the intersection of traditional Arabic culture, including Arabic folk melodies and dance rhythms, with contemporary musical idioms. Inspired by nomadic Bedouin cultures, his style is often characterized by lyrical melodies and occasional percussive dissonance. Specific Arabic cultural elements that can be found in his music include fragments of Arabic scales (maqāmāt) including use of the harmonic minor second to reference traditional Arabic tuning systems (gadwal), polyphony, original melodies and traditional folk songs, dabkeh rhythms, references to pre-Islamic poetry (Mu'allaqāt), and representations of ululation and improvised chants on the traditional trope "ya leyl" ("oh, night"). His compositions have been premiered in the USA, Canada, Sweden, Estonia, Australia, Ukraine, Colombia, Egypt, and Jordan.

=== Solo piano ===
- Wadi Rum (2006)
- Mu'allaqah Suite (2017): I. Atlal, II. Rahil, III. Ghazal, IV. Fakhr
- The Patriot (2018) for kneeling pianist (with Vanessa Cornett)
- Echoes From Petra (2018)
- Our Masterpiece Destroyed! (2020)
- The Phoenix: "Still We Rise" (2022)
- Ritha' [Elegy] for Gaza (2023)
- Toccata on a Jordanian Folk Tune (2024)
- Tafta Hindi (2025)
- Nidaa [The Call] (2026)

=== Voice and piano ===
- The Eternal Nomad (2020)
- The Nabatean (2020)
- Lamma Bada Yatathanna (2021)
- Ya Asmar Illown (2021)
- La Rosa Enflorece (2021)
- La Piragua (2024)

=== Cello and piano ===
- Elegy: Prelude and Fugue (2015)

=== Guitar and cello ===
- Lamma Bada Yatathanna (2023)
- Tafta Hindi (2025)

=== Arrangements for piano four hands ===
- Valse (2018) by Alfred Schnittke, arr. Salam Murtada
- A Prayer for Ukraine (2022) by Mykola Lysenko, arr. Salam Murtada and Vanessa Cornett
