= Yudl Yoffe =

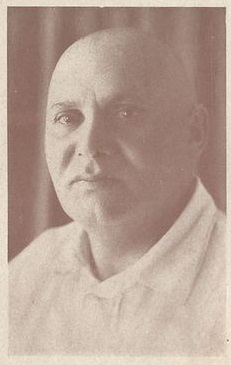
Yudl Yoffe

Yudl Yoffe or Yudl Yofe (Yiddish: יודל יאָפע, Russian: Юдл Иоффе; Юдель Иофе, 1882–1941/1942) a was Yiddish writer, translator and sculptor.

== Biography ==
Yoffe was born in 1882 in Borzna, Chernigov Governorate. Left an orphan early, he was brought up by his sister in Nizhyn, worked as an apprentice for a tailor, joined the revolutionary movement and, as an agitator, traveled around the Jewish miasteczkoes of Ukraine and Bessarabia, was arrested. Until 1926 he was a tailor. He began his literary work in the magazine «Lebn un Wisnschaft» (Yiddish: לעבן און וויסנשאַפֿט — Life and Science) under the pseudonym «Folkskind» (Yiddish: פאָלקסקינד — Child of the Folk). In 1903 he published an essay in an illegal publishing house in Chișinău. After the 1905 revolution in Russia, he became close to the anarchists. He began his literary career in 1915 with the publication of the story «Dos Eidem» (Son-in-law) in the magazine «Die idische Welt» (The Yiddish World) (1915). At one time he was engaged in sculpture (self-taught), took part in the Kyiv exhibition of Jewish artists in 1920. He was one of the founders of the Jewish section of the Moscow Association of Proletarian Writers. In 1921 he moved to Moscow. Collaborated in Jewish newspapers, magazines. The following books were published: «In Kessl grub» (In the Boiler-Pit; 1929), «A dire» (Flat; 1929), «In groissn NEP Hoif» (In the Large NEP Homestead; 1929), «In Kamf» (In the Fight; 1932), «Onwuks» (Tumor; 1932), «Fun trep, zu trep» (From the Steps to the Steps; 1933), dedicated to the civil war in Ukraine, the years of the New Economic Policy, and socialist construction. Yoffe is a realist writer leaning towards portraiture and lyrical sketching. Workers, worker correspondents, student workers, responsible workers, NEPmans — this is the social type of his works. All his works are imbued with the pathos of the struggle for socialist life and culture. He published essays and poems in various Jewish periodicals. He translated the works of Russian classics into Yiddish.

Yoffe died in 1941 or 1942 in Moscow.

== Works ==
- 1915 דאָס איידעם
- 1929 א דירע : דערציילונגען
  - 2004 א דירע : דערציילונגען
- 1929 אין קעסל-גרוב : דערציילונגען
- 1929 אין גרויסן נעפ הויף
  - in 1930, the book «אין גרויסן נעפ הויף» was published in an authorized translation in Russian under the title: «На нэповском подворьи»
- 1932 אנוווקס : (ראמאן אין פיר טיילן)
- 1932 אין קאמף : דערציילונגען
- 1933 פון טרעפ צו טרעפ
- 1934 ארטשיק ברוק : דערצײלונג פאר קינדער
  - 2003 ארטשיק ברוק : דערצײלונג פאר קינדער
- 1936 דאָס איידעמל : ראָמאנ
- 1936 דערצײלונגענ
- 1936 מעלוכע־פארלאג פונ װײסרוסלאנד
- 1938 אלע וועלטנ : דערציילונגענ
- 1938 פונ אמאל
- 1940 פרישע קויכעס : ראמאנ
- 1940 גינגאָלד
- 1941 אפנ גלייכנ וועג : דערציילונגענ
