= Maurice Yaffé =

British psychologist

Maurice Yaffé (1944/45 - 27 October 1989) was a British psychologist who was Principal Clinical Psychologist at Guy's Hospital. He studied the psychology of sex and fear of flying, and served on the British Olympic Association's medical advisory committee.

In the 1970s he worked on the Longford Report.

His book "Sexual Happiness: a practical approach" was described as pervaded by a "healthy optimism".

== Books ==
- Yaffé, Maurice (1982). The Influence of pornography on behaviour. London: Academic Press. ISBN 0127678506.
- Yaffé, Maurice (1988). Sexual happiness : a practical approach (1st American ed.). New York: H. Holt. ISBN 0805006915.
- Yaffé, Maurice (1998). Take the fear out of flying (New rev. ed.). London: Robinson. ISBN 9781854878649.
