= Rivke Jaffe =

Dutch anthropologist (born 1978)

Rivke Jaffe (born 1978) is an American-born Dutch anthropologist by background, as of 2016 appointed professor of Urban Geography at the University of Amsterdam.

== Career ==
Born in 1978, in Charlottesville, Virginia, Jaffe studied Cultural Anthropology and Development Sociology at Leiden University, where she also wrote a Ph.D. dissertation on urban environmental problems and community involvement in Kingston, under the supervision of Peter Nas. Together with later fieldwork in Jamaica as well as Curaçao her dissertation formed the basis for the monograph Concrete Jungles. After writing her dissertation Jaffe held positions as postdoctoral researcher at the Royal Netherlands Institute of Southeast Asian and Caribbean Studies (KITLV) and lecturer at Leiden University and University of the West Indies. From 2012 she worked as assistant professor at the University of Amsterdam, where she was appointed associate professor in 2013. Over her career Jaffe has been awarded various research grants, including an NWO VENI grant for the research project Between the Street and the State: Crime and Citizenship in Kingston, Jamaica, a NWO VIDI and Aspasia grant for a five-year research project on The Politics of Security: The Impacts of Public-Private Security Assemblages on Governance and Citizenship, and an ERC Starting grant for the five-year research project Transforming Citizenship through Hybrid Governance: The Impacts of Public-Private Security Assemblages. She is web editor and editorial board member of the International Journal of Urban and Regional Research, co-editor of the European Review of Latin American and Caribbean Studies and editorial board member of American Anthropologist.

In 2016, Jaffe was appointed professor of Cities, Politics and Culture at the University of Amsterdam. In her inaugural lecture she argued for a combination of methods from humanities and social sciences, such as long-term ethnography and cultural analysis, to develop new understandings of the political and the urban.
