= Barenboim–Said Akademie =

German music school

Coordinates: 52°30′56″N 13°23′46″E

Barenboim-Said Akademie
- Type: Public–private
- Established: 2016
- Founders: Daniel Barenboim; Edward Said
- Students: 90
- Location: Berlin, Germany
- Website: barenboimsaid.de

The Barenboim–Said Akademie (German: Barenboim-Said Akademie, Arabic: أكاديمية بارنبويم-سعيد, Hebrew: אקדמיית ברנבוים-סעיד) is an academy located in Berlin, Germany, offering bachelor's degrees and Artist Diploma certificates in music; it opened on 8 December 2016. It was co-founded by the conductor and pianist Daniel Barenboim and the literary theorist Edward Said. The academy was financed to a capacity of 90 young musicians, with an admissions focus on the Middle East and North Africa, in the spirit of the West–Eastern Divan Orchestra. The academy features a concert hall for chamber music, the Pierre Boulez Saal.

== Background ==
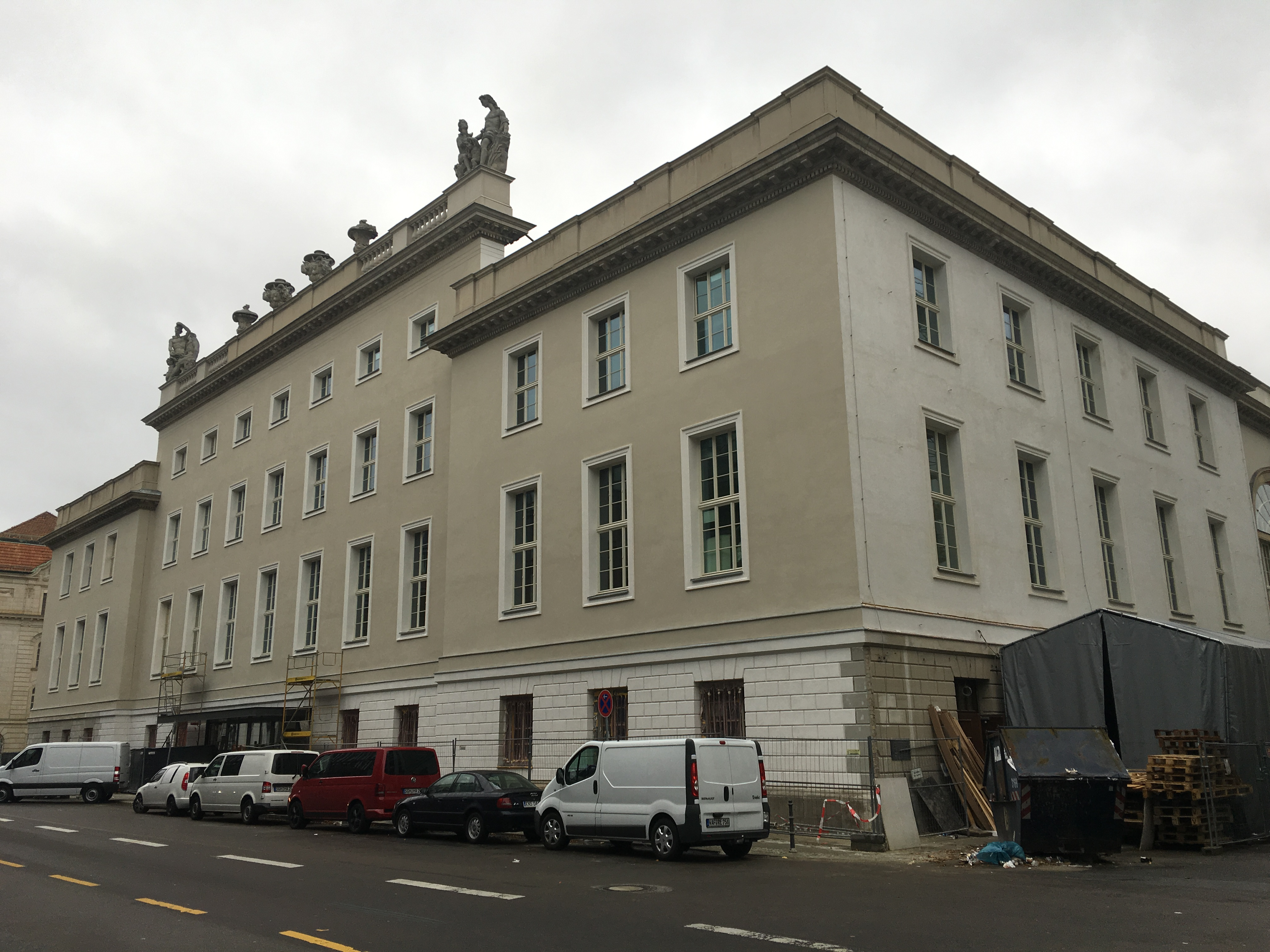
The façade of the Barenboim–Said Academy on Französische Straße

The creation of the Barenboim–Said Akademie in 2015 was rooted in a pre-existing peace project, the West-Eastern Divan Orchestra. Edward Said and Daniel Barenboim co-founded the West–Eastern Divan Orchestra in Weimar, Germany in 1999, named after the West–östlicher Divan (West–Eastern Divan), an anthology of poems by Johann Wolfgang von Goethe, who took his inspiration from the Persian poet Hafez. The first ensemble workshop took place in 1999, part of Weimar's program as the European Capital of Culture. The academy, which emerged from the Orchestra, offers a program jointly in the music and in humanities, with the intent "to train excellent musicians who are also curious and well-educated."

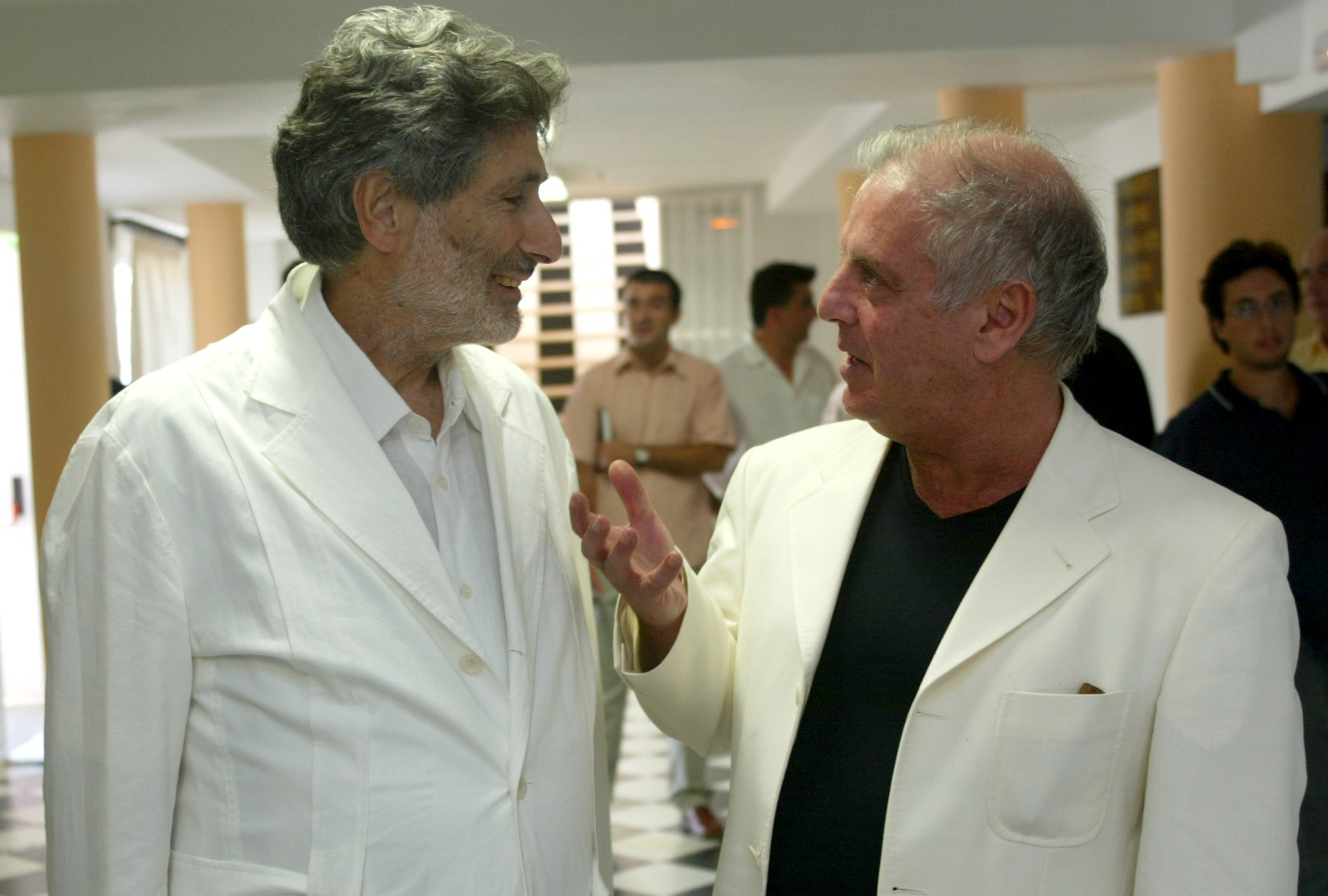
Edward Said and Daniel Barenboim in Seville, 2002

Edward Said said of the founding of the Western-Eastern Divan Orchestra,

"Separation between peoples is not a solution for any of the problems that divide peoples. And certainly ignorance of the other provides no help whatever. Cooperation and coexistence of the kind that music lived as we have lived, performed, shared and loved it together, might be."

== Faculty ==
- Radek Baborák
- James Helgeson, Academy Dean
- Frans Helmerson
- Michael Naumann (retired 2021)
- Emmanuel Pahud
- Joseph Pearson
- András Schiff
- Klaus Thunemann
- Jörg Widmann

== Facilities ==
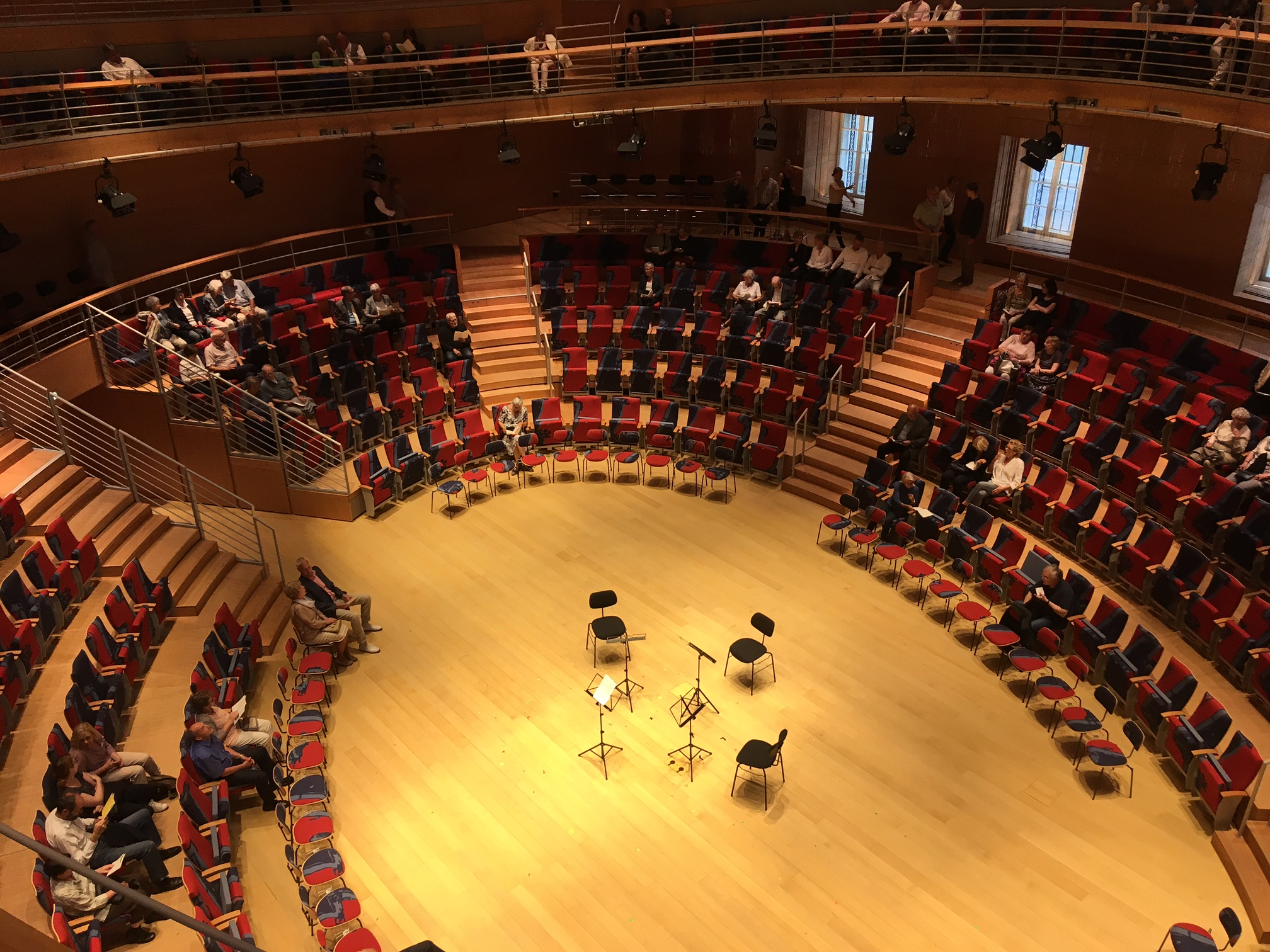
Pierre Boulez Saal

The Barenboim–Said Akademie is located in the Mitte district of Berlin, housed in the former depot for stage sets of the Staatsoper Unter den Linden. It was rebuilt after its destruction in World War II between 1951 and 1955 by the architect Richard Paulick. The building is landmark protected; its exterior and the main parts of its interior have been restored. A total of 6,500 m^{2} of floor space houses 21 rehearsal rooms, an auditorium, offices and ancillary spaces. The main addition to the building is a 682-seat Pierre Boulez Saal in the eastern wing of the building, based on a design by Frank Gehry and planned by Yasuhisa Toyota as chief acoustician. The design of the concert hall reflects the ideas of French composer, director and theoretician Pierre Boulez, who was also consulted on the project. Construction costs are estimated at €36 million, financed by private donors and a €20 million grant from the German Federal Government. The Barenboim–Said Academy moved into the space in the fall of 2016. The concert hall was inaugurated on 4 March 2017.

== Depictions in popular culture ==
The Netflix miniseries Unorthodox based its fictional music academy on the Barenboim–Said Akademie.

== Relevant publications and performances ==
- Barenboim, Daniel; West-Eastern Divan Orchestra (2012), Knowledge is the beginning (in no linguistic content), Berlin: EuroArts Music International, OCLC 1188354496
- Barenboim, Daniel; Said, Edward W.; Guzelimian, Ara (2004). Parallels and paradoxes : explorations in music and society. New York: Vintage Books. ISBN 1-4000-7515-7. OCLC 54858478.
- "Remembering Edward W. Said. Ara Guzelimian and Daniel Barenboim in Conversation." ICLS Columbia, 1 February 2013 iTunes
- Cheah, Elena (2009). Die Kraft der Musik das West-Eastern Divan Orchestra (in German). München: Bertelsmann. ISBN 978-3-570-58009-7. OCLC 437034507. Mit einem Vorwort von Daniel Barenboim. Edition Elke Heidenreich, C. Bertelsmann.
- "Palestinian-Israeli orchestra marks 10th anniversary" (al Jazeera English), 21 August 2009 on YouTube
- Daniel Barenboim: Beethoven for All – Symphonies (Decca Classics), 18 January 2012 on YouTube
- Yammine, Georges; Barenboim, Daniel (2014). Funkelnde Hoffnung : das West-Eastern Divan Orchestra und die Kraft der Musik (in German). Wiesbaden: Corso. ISBN 978-3-7374-0704-5. OCLC 908681045.
