= Deborah Yaffe =

American author (born 1965)

- Born: 1965 (age 60–61)

Deborah Yaffe (born 1965) is a freelance journalist and the author of two books, Other People's Children: The Battle for Justice and Equality in New Jersey's Schools (Rutgers University Press/Rivergate Books, 2007) and Among the Janeites: A Journey through the World of Jane Austen Fandom (Houghton Mifflin Harcourt/Mariner, 2013).

Among the Janeites is a nonfiction look at the quirky subculture of passionate Jane Austen fans, known as "Janeites," among whom Yaffe includes herself. The book was reviewed in the New York Times Book Review, The Daily Beast, Publishers Weekly, and Kirkus Reviews, among others.

Other People's Children was the first narrative history of Robinson v. Cahill and Abbott v. Burke, New Jersey's long-running school finance lawsuits, which sought to equalize the funding available to the state's wealthy and low-income school districts.

Yaffe has been a newspaper reporter in Jersey City, Freehold and Trenton, New Jersey, and in San Francisco. She now works as a freelance journalist.
