= Jaffa Phonix =

- Origin: Egypt
- Genres: Hip hop Techno; Big beat
- Years active: 2003–present
- Labels: None
- Members: DJ Feedo; MC Ali; Feedo
- Website: / JaffaPhonix@MySpace

Jaffa Phonix is a Palestinian band whose music consists of electronica, hip hop and big beat. The previous band members are Khalil (composer/vocalist), Ali (lyricist/vocalist), DJ Feedo (turntablist). After several live performances, the band started to deviate from hip hop to a style which combined big beat and dance instrumentals with varied lyrical elements.

Jaffa Phonix first emerged from the underground hip/hop scene in Egypt, and garnered mainstream recognition after a track from their first album, "Osti" (My Story), was played on the Egypt's biggest radio station, Nile FM.

The band's performance took place in Cairo, November 24, 2006, was in front of almost 15,000 people at the second SOS music festival.
