= Arabic music =

Music of the Arab World

Arabic music (Arabic: الموسيقى العربية, romanized: al-mūsīqā l-ʿarabiyyah) is the music of the Arab world with all its diverse music styles and genres. Arabs have created varied styles of music with songs and instrumental ensembles in many linguistic varieties, with each country and region having their own folk, classical and modern musical styles.

Arabic music, which is based on the maqam system, has experienced a long history of exchange with other regional musical styles and genres. It represents the music of the people that make up the Arab world today.

== History ==
=== Pre-Islamic period ===
Pre-Islamic Arabia was the cradle of early achievements in music, musical theory and the development of musical instruments. In historical Yemen, the main center of pre-Islamic Arab sciences, literature and arts, musicians benefited from the patronage of the Kings of Sabaʾ who encouraged the development of music. For centuries, the Arabs of Hejaz recognized that the best Arabic music came from Yemen, and Hadhrami minstrels were considered to be superior musicians.

Pre-Islamic Arabian peninsular music was similar to that of ancient Middle Eastern music. Most historians^{[who?]} agree that there existed distinct forms of music in the Arabian peninsula in the pre-Islamic period between the 5th and 7th century AD. Arab poets of that time—called shu`ara' al-jahiliyah (Arabic: شعراء الجاهلية) or "Jahili poets", meaning "the poets of the period of ignorance"—used to recite poems sung with high notes.

Some people believed that Jinns revealed poems to poets and music to musicians. The choir at the time served as a pedagogic means where poets would recite their poems. Singing was entrusted to women with beautiful voices who would learn how to play some instruments used at that time such as frame drums, the lute or the rebab, and perform their songs while respecting the poetic metre. The compositions were simple and every singer would sing in a single maqam. Among the notable songs of the period were the huda (from which the ghina derived), the nasb, sanad, and rukbani.

=== Early Islamic period ===
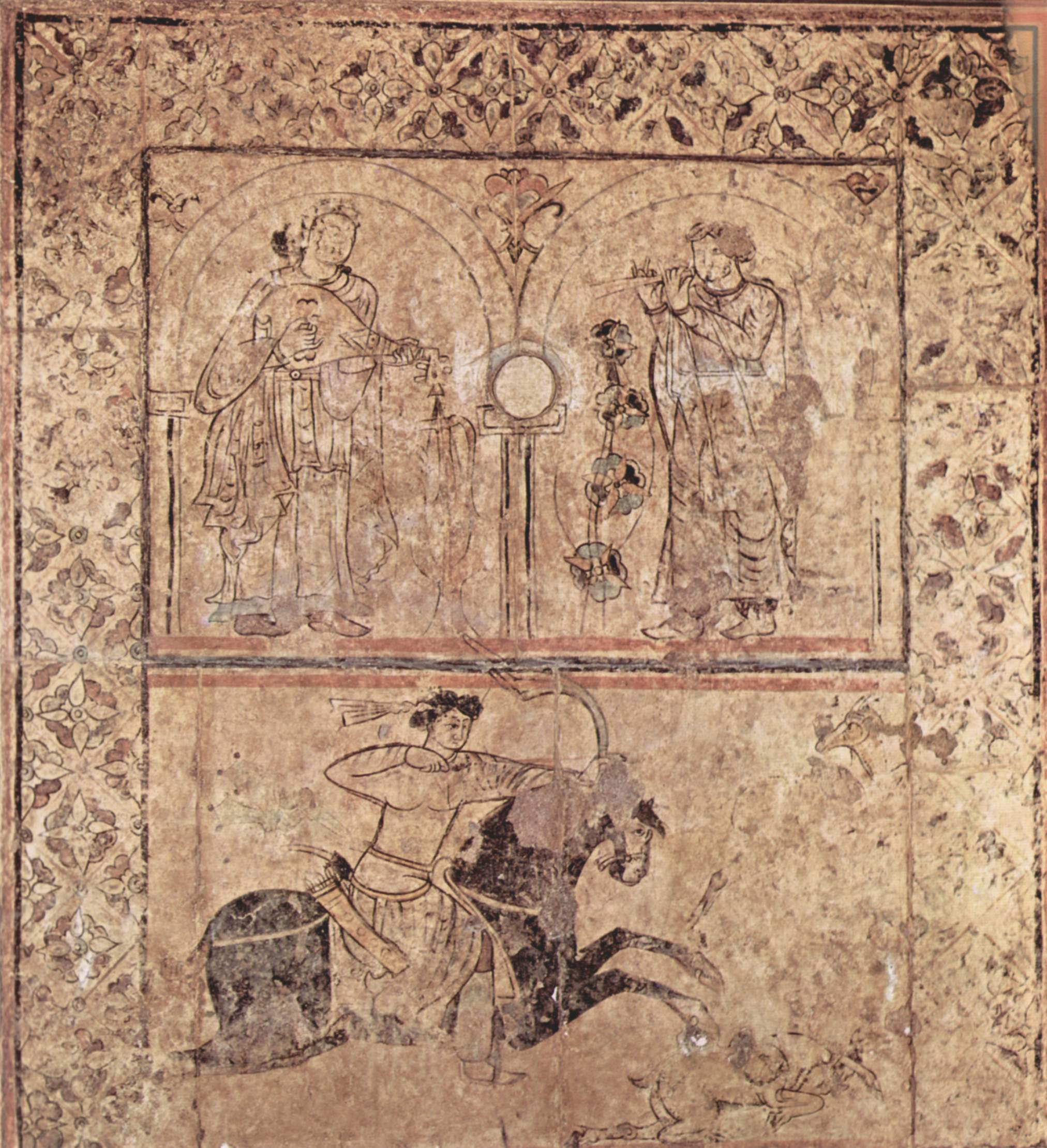
An 8th-century Umayyad fresco with musicians from Qasr al-Hayr al-Gharbi, Syria.

Al-Kindi (801–873 AD) was a notable early theorist of Arabic music. He was joined by al-Farabi (872–950) in proposing the addition of a fifth string to the oud. Al-Farabi published several tracts on musical theory, including the cosmological connotations of music. He identified twelve tones on the Arabic musical scale, based on the position of the fingerson the strings of the oud. Al-Farabi wrote a notable book on Islamic music titled Kitab al-Musiqa al-Kabir (The Great Book of Music). His Arabian tone system is still in use. Abulfaraj (897–967) wrote the Kitab al-Aghani, an encyclopedic collection of poems and songs that contains over 20 volumes in modern editions. Al-Ghazali (1059–1111) wrote a treatise on similar music in Persia in which he declared "Ecstasy means the state that comes from listening to music."

In 1252, Safi al-Din developed a new form of musical notation, where rhythms were indicated by geometric representation. – A similar geometric representation would not appear in the Western world until 1987, when Kjell Gustafson published a method to represent a rhythm as a two-dimensional graph.

==== Al-Andalus ====
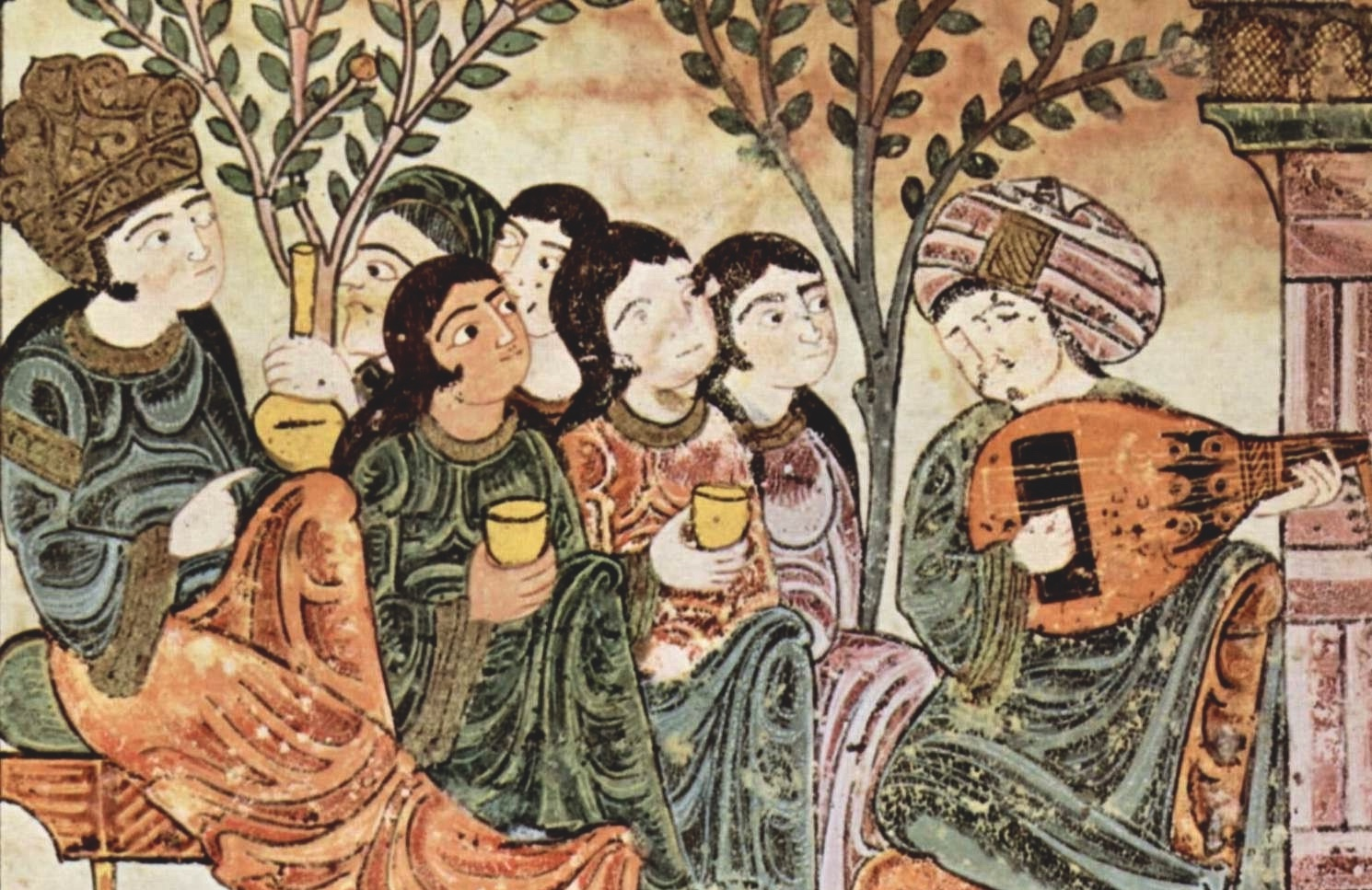
A lady and qiyan with an oud player. 13th-century, Al Andalus

By the 11th century, Islamic Iberia had become a center for the manufacture of musical instruments. These instruments spread gradually throughout France, influencing French troubadours, and eventually reaching other regions of Europe. The English words lute, rebec, and naker are derived from Arabic oud, rabab or Maghreb rebab, and naqareh.

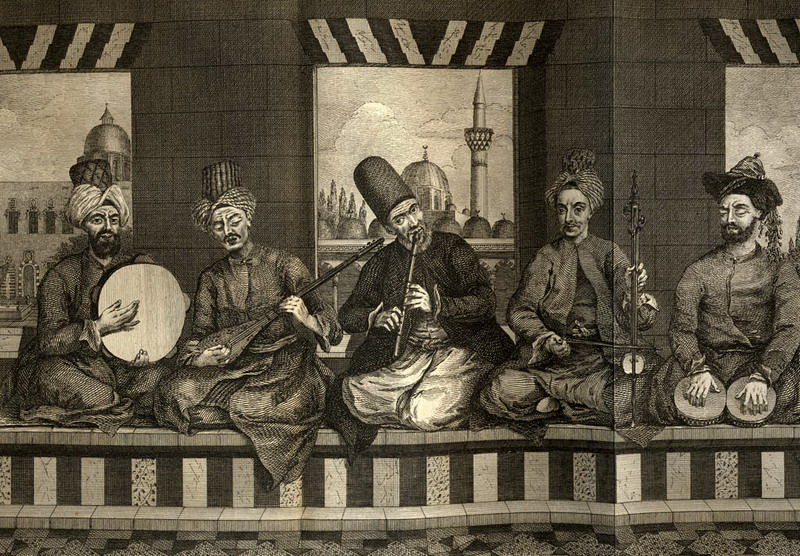
Musicians in Ottoman Aleppo, 18th century. A Turk beats the daf, a Christian plays tanboor, a Dervish plays ney, a Christian plays kamangi and the fifth man beats on nakara.

=== 16th to 19th century ===
Bartol Gyurgieuvits (1506–1566) spent 13 years as a slave in the Ottoman Empire. After escaping, he published De Turcarum ritu et caermoniis in Amsterdam in 1544. It is one of the first European books to describe music in Islamic society.

=== 20th century–present ===
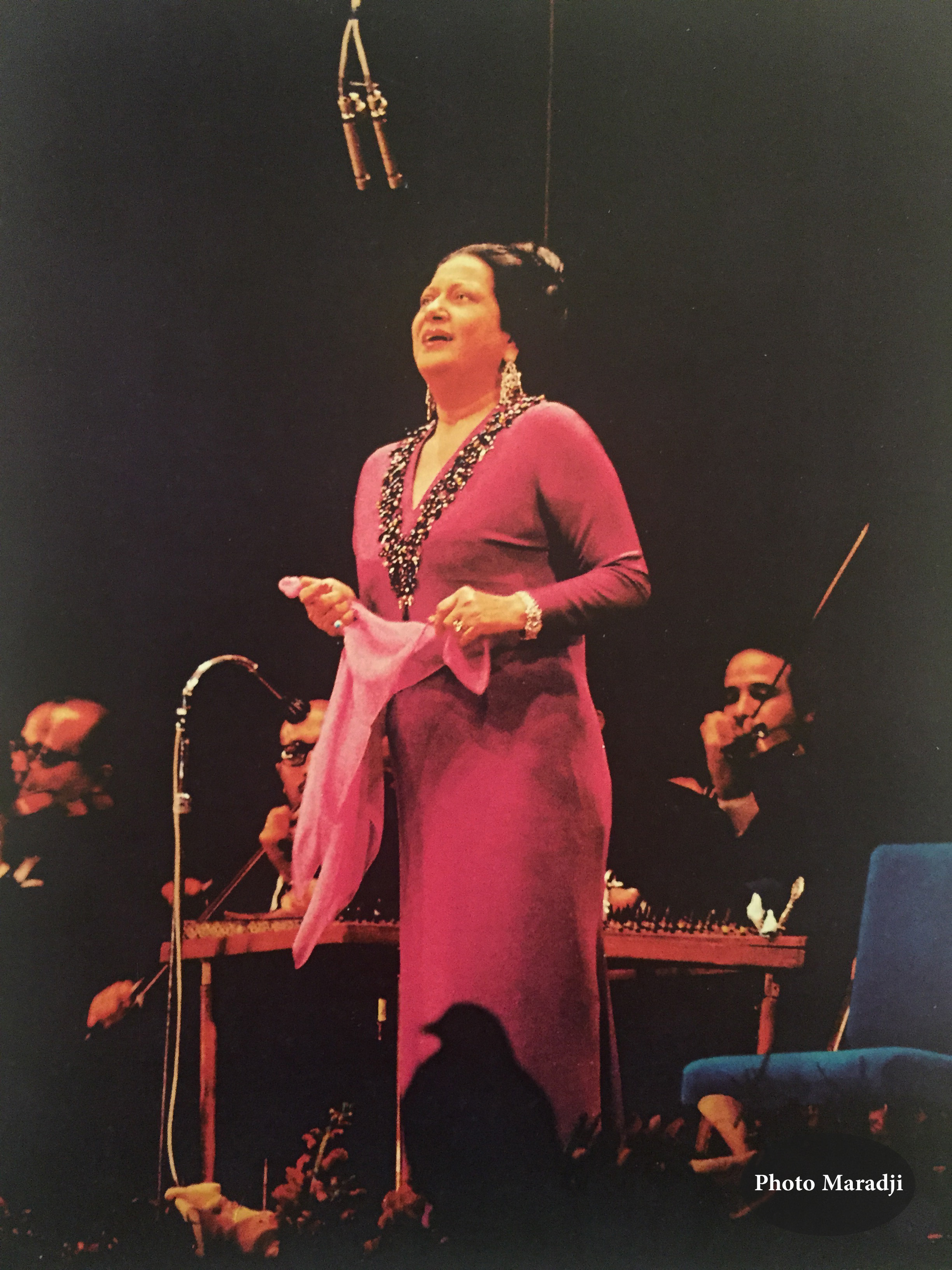
Umm Kulthum

In the early 20th century, Egypt was the first in a series of Arab countries to experience a sudden emergence of nationalism. English, French and European songs were replaced by national Egyptian music. Cairo became a center for musical innovation.

Female singers were some of the first to adopt a secular approach. Egyptian performer Umm Kulthum and Lebanese singer Fairuz were notable examples of this. Both have been popular through the decades that followed and considered legends of Arabic music. Moroccan singer Zohra Al Fassiya was the first female singer to achieve wide popularity in the Maghreb region, performing traditional Arab-Andalusian songs and recording numerous albums of her own.

During the 1940s and into the 1960s, Arabic music began to take on a more Western tone – Egyptian artists Umm Kulthum and Abdel Halim Hafez along with composers Mohammed Abdel Wahab and Baligh Hamdi pioneered the use of western instruments in Egyptian music. By the 1970s other singers had followed suit and a strand of Arabic pop was born. Arabic pop usually consists of Western-styled songs with Arabic instruments and lyrics. Melodies and arrangements are often a mix between Eastern and Western.

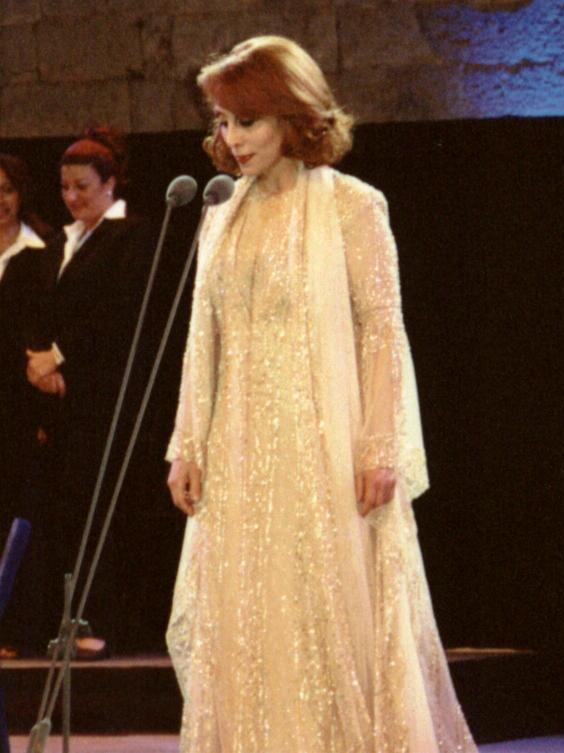
Fairuz

Western pop music was also influenced by Arabic music in the early 1960s, leading to the development of surf music, a rock music genre that later gave rise to garage rock and punk rock. Surf rock pioneer Dick Dale, a Lebanese American guitarist, was greatly influenced by the Arabic music he learnt from his uncle, particularly the oud melodies and skills which he later applied to his electric guitar playing when recording surf rock in the early 1960s.

Baligh Hamdi who created and composed many hit songs for several Arab singers, frequently said that he drew upon musical ideas and aesthetics in Egyptian folk melodies and rhythms in composing his songs. He also drew on ideas in the contemporary music of his time. His sound has a classical flavor due to the heavy use of the string orchestra. But he also made some use of electronic keyboards and guitars in harmony with the strings, or alternating with the strings. His best work is published as recordings under the name of the singer. The singers include Umm Kulthum, Abdel Halim Hafez, Shadia, Layla Murad, Najat Al Saghira, Fayza Ahmed, Warda (whom he was married to for a decade), Sabah, and other singers. He had also collaborated with the legendary singer Aziza Jalal who promoted her songs Mestaniak and Haramt El Hob Alaya one of the best Arabic songs in the 80s.

In the 1990s, Arab artists who took up this style were Amr Diab, Moustafa Amar, Najwa Karam, Elissa, Nawal Al Zoghbi, Nancy Ajram, Haifa Wehbe, Angham, Fadl Shaker, Majida Al Roumi, Wael Kfoury, Asalah Nasri, Myriam Fares, Carole Samaha, Yara, Samira Said, Hisham Abbas, Kadhem Al Saher, Ehab Tawfik, Mohamed Fouad, Diana Haddad, Mohamed Mounir, Latifa, Cheb Khaled, George Wassouf, Hakim, Fares Karam, Julia Boutros, and Amal Hijazi. In 1936, Iraq Radio was established by the Iraqi Jewish musicians, Saleh and Daoud al-Kuwaity. The brothers played a pioneering role in the modern music of Iraq. Saleh was considered the father of Iraqi maqam and wrote the first song. He also composed for famous singers of that era in Iraq and the Arab world, such as Salima Murad, Afifa Iskandar, Nazem al-Ghazali, Umm Kulthum, Mohammed Abdel Wahab.

One of the main reasons for the predominance of Jewish instrumentalists in early 20th century Iraqi music was a school for blind Jewish children in Baghdad founded in the late 1920s by the qanunji ("qanun player") Joseph Hawthorne (Yusef Za'arur) (Hebrew: דנדהי ללוואלד-יוסף זערור).

Salima Pasha was one of the most famous singers of the 1930s–1940s. The respect and adoration for Pasha were unusual at the time, since public performance by women was considered shameful in the region, and most female singers were recruited from brothels.

The music in Iraq began to take a more Western tone during the 1960s and 1970s, notably by Ilham Madfai, with his Western guitar stylings with traditional Iraqi music which made him a popular performer in his native country and throughout the Middle East.

== Influence of Arabic music ==
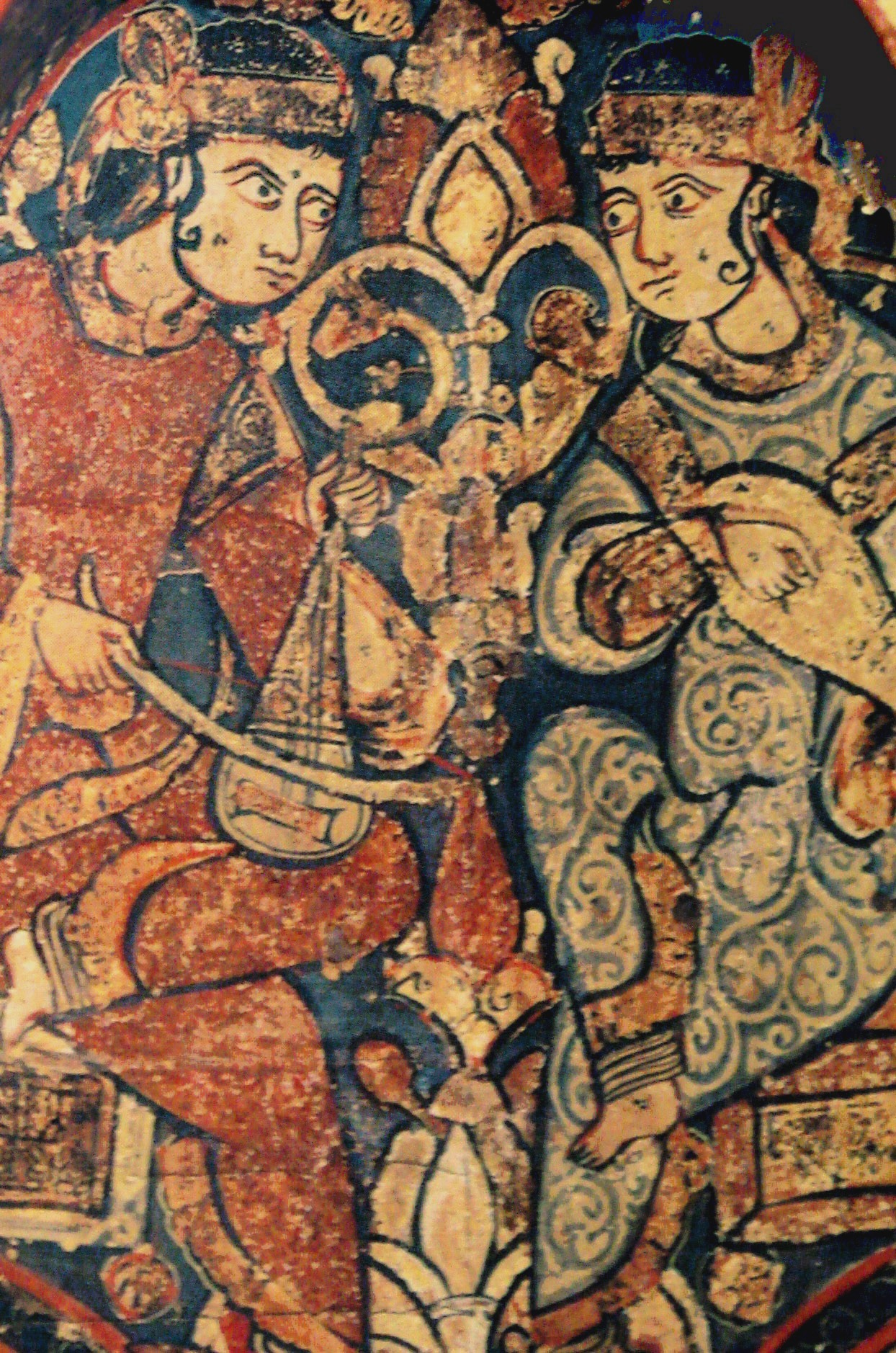
12th-century Arabic painting of musicians in Palermo, Sicily.

The majority of musical instruments used in European medieval and classical music have roots in Arabic musical instruments that were adopted from the medieval Arab world. They include the lute, which shares an ancestor with the oud; rebec (an ancestor of the violin) from rebab, guitar from qitara, naker from naqareh, adufe from al-duff, alboka from al-buq, anafil from al-nafir, exabeba (a type of flute) from al-shabbaba, atabal (a type of bass drum) from al-tabl, atambal from al-tinbal, the balaban, castanet from kasatan, and sonajas de azófar from sunuj al-sufr.

The Arabic rabāb, also known as the spiked fiddle, is the earliest known bowed string instrument and the ancestor of all the European bowed instruments, including the rebec, the Byzantine lyra, and the violin. The Arabic oud in Arab music shares an ancestor with the European lute. The oud is also cited as a precursor to the modern guitar. The guitar has roots in the four-string oud, brought to Iberia by the Moors in the 8th century. A direct ancestor of the modern guitar is the guitarra morisca (Moorish guitar), which was in use in Spain by the 12th century. By the 14th century, it was simply referred to as a guitar.

A number of medieval conical bore instruments were likely introduced or popularized by Arab musicians, including the xelami (from zulami).

Some scholars believe that the troubadors may have had Arabian origins, with Magda Bogin stating that the Arab poetic and musical tradition was one of several influences on European "courtly love poetry". Évariste Lévi-Provençal and other scholars stated that three lines of a poem by William IX of Aquitaine were in some form of Arabic, indicating a potential Andalusian origin for his works. The scholars attempted to translate the lines in question and produced various different translations. The medievalist Istvan Frank contended that the lines were not Arabic at all, but instead the result of the rewriting of the original by a later scribe.

The theory that the troubadour tradition was created by William after his experience of Moorish arts while fighting with the Reconquista in Spain has been championed by Ramón Menéndez Pidal and Idries Shah. George T. Beech states that there is only one documented battle that William fought in Spain, and it occurred towards the end of his life. Beech adds that William and his father did have Spanish individuals within their extended family, and that while there is no evidence he himself knew Arabic, he may have been friendly with some Europeans who could speak the language. Others state that the notion that William created the concept of troubadours is itself incorrect, and that his "songs represent not the beginnings of a tradition but summits of achievement in that tradition."

Most scholars believe that Guido of Arezzo's solfège musical notation system had its origins in a Latin hymn, but others suggest that it may have had Arabic origins instead. The Solfège syllables (do, re, mi, fa, sol, la, ti) may have been derived from the syllables of an Arabic solmization system Durr-i-Mufassal ("Separated Pearls") (dal, ra, mim, fa, sad, lam). This was first proposed by Meninski in his Thesaurus Linguarum Orientalum (1680). However, there is no documentary evidence for this theory, and no Arabic musical manuscripts using sequences from the Arabic alphabet are known to exist. Henry George Farmer believed that there is no firm evidence on the origins of the notation and therefore the Arabic origin theory and the hymnal origin theories are equally credible.

== Improvised music ==
Ethnomusicologist Ali Jihad Racy wrote about the improvisation style of music that is present in much of the Arab world. Racy discussed the regional attitudes towards improvisation in Middle Eastern music by stating that improvisation can suggest casual or untrained or even non-professional music-making. This is held only by certain communities within the Arabic world and can differ from each region or community. Some regions understand improvisation music as the intuitive artistic ability that momentarily expresses the intuition of the player. Other groups tend to view improvisation as though it is the fulfillment of music transcending the classical maqam style or other styles of music playing. Other schools of thought on improvisation music, in the Arab world, believe that improvisation music shows a lack of understanding in musical training. Racy does not specify which groups have what views. Rather, the discussion is more focused on the idea that the Arabic music world is not monolithic in its view on improvisation in music. Other groups view improvisation as only learned through trial and error taking many years to perfect thus being a style played professionals.

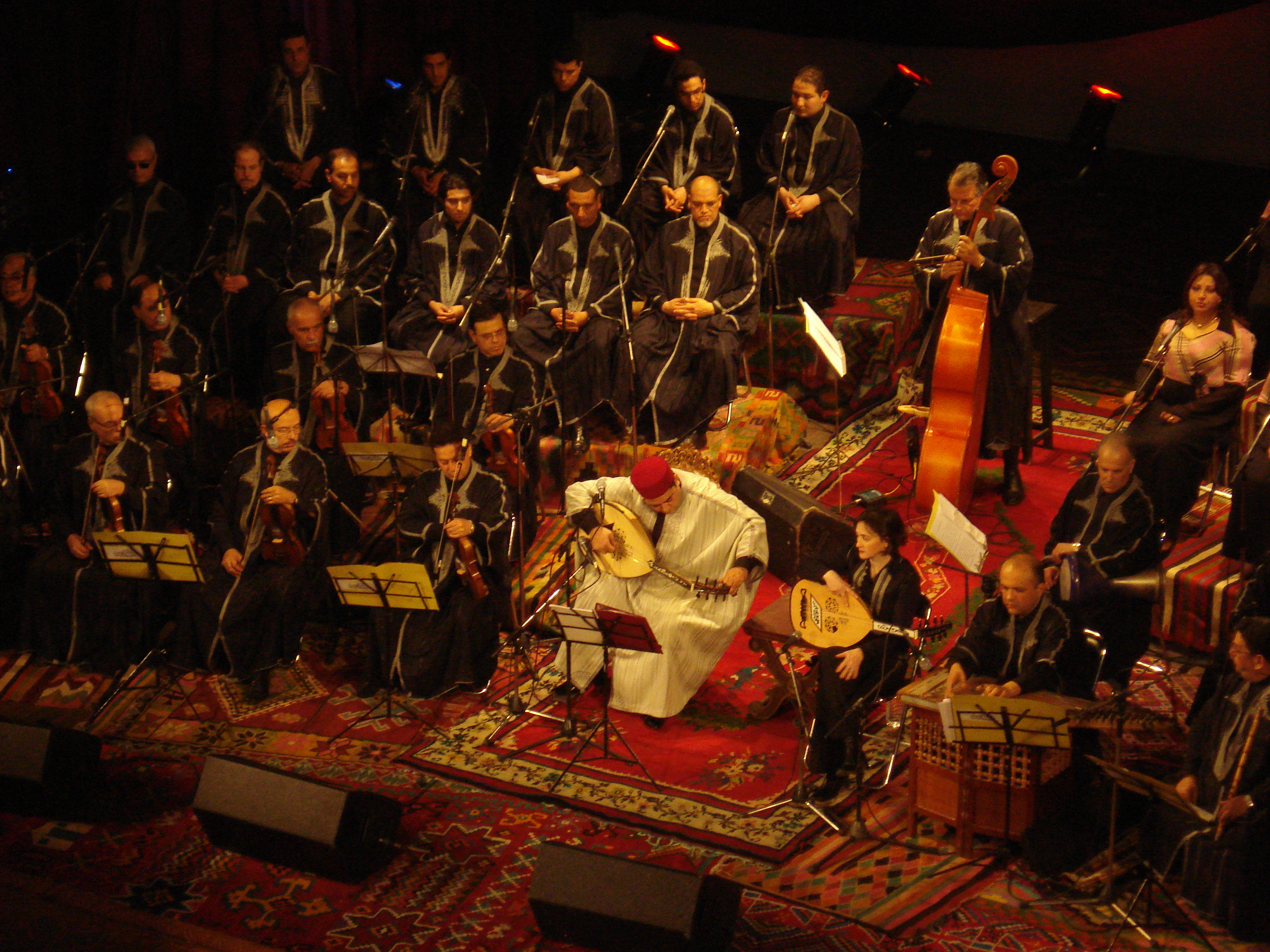
The Rachidia music ensemble in Tunisia

=== Taqsim ===
A respected tradition in Arabic musical improvisation is known as taqsim. Taqsim is based on a specific maqam and the musician improvises the mode and structure of the musical piece, which may create a cathartic experience for the listener. Further, the improvisation aspects go beyond the form and are expressed in the quartertones of the song. This tradition historically was performed as a chant. Now it is used by performers on the oud, violin, or ney, a type of end-blown flute. This style of improvisation is known for the effects it can conjure up in a listener. Listeners may laugh, cry, and shout at different points in the performance due to the emotions evoked by the music.

=== Improvisation in Chant ===
- A certain type of Arabic chant is in the melismatic style and is both long and highly ornamented. It has specific elements of free rhythm and improvisation as part of its structure. Syllabic chant is isochronic and is accompanied by an al-durbkkeh (a percussion instrument or drum) while being relatively fast in its nature. There is usually participation from the listeners who contribute through the clapping of hands to the rhythm.
- Ethnomusicologist Jargy tells of another type of improvisation music in which he uses the name Median. This music is a combination of the syllabic chant and the melismatic style. Median improvisation music uses more extreme improvisation methods and expands the boundaries of improvisation and is usually faster than syllabic chant.
- The last improvisation style discussed by Jargy is the recitative style that is sung predominantly by women and is built on aural tradition.

== Genres ==
=== Franco-Arabic ===
Franco-Arabic music is a form of music similar to modern Arabic Pop. The genre was popularized by artists such as Dalida from Egypt, Sammy Clark from Lebanon and Aldo from Australia. Franco-Arabic music includes a variety of languages, including Arabic, Italian, French Arabic and English.

=== Arabic R&B, reggae, and hip hop ===
A rise of Arabic R&B, reggae and hip hop has been taking place since the early 2010s. These songs usually feature a rapper in a traditional Arab pop song (such as Ishtar's song 'Habibi Sawah'). The Moroccan singer Elam Jay developed a contemporary version of the Gnawa genre that is fused with R&B, named Gnawitone Styla. Another variation of contemporary Gnawa played in Morocco was introduced by the band Darga. Based in Casablanca, the group utilises a mix Gnawa and Reggae in some of their songs.

Political Reggae artists such as TootArd from the occupied Syrian Golan Heights started gaining popularity in Palestine in 2011 after the release of a song about the Arab Spring (mainly the Tunisian revolution), called "The Green Revolution". It was sung by them and an ensemble of Palestinian artists, most notable among them being Mahmoud Jrere of DAM. Another notable Arab artist is Shadia Mansour, who is a Palestinian British rapper known as "The First Lady of Arab Hip Hop. Much of her music focuses on the Palestinian cause.

Starting in the 2010s, some artists such as Darine began to utilise fully R&B and reggae beats in their songs. This has been met with mixed reviews and mixed commercial performance.

=== Arabic electronica ===
A combination of electronic music with traditional Middle Eastern instruments has been popularized by Richii with songs like "Ana Lubnaneyoun".

=== Arabic jazz ===
Arabic jazz using jazz instruments has become popular. Musicians like Samir Suroor began to play the saxophone in the "oriental" style. Abdel Halim Hafez, Kadim Al Sahir and Rida Al Abdallah also play in this style. The first mainstream jazz elements were incorporated into Arabic music by the Rahbani brothers. Fairuz's later work was almost exclusively made up of jazz songs, composed by her son Ziad Rahbani. Ziad Rahbani also pioneered today's oriental jazz movement, to which singers including Rima Khcheich, Salma El Mosfi, and (on occasion) Latifa adhere. We can also find a lot of jazz music in Mohamed Mounir's songs starting from his first album Alemony Eneeki in 1977, and he is considered to be the King of Arabic Jazz and Arabic Music generally. Another notable performer of this genre is the Palestinian singer Reem Kelani who blends jazz with Arabic music, both in her own compositions and in her arrangements of traditional songs.

Arabic Jazz has met many new kinds of composition since the end of the 20th century:

- Modal forms with Anouar Brahem and Rabih Abou Khalil
- Mixed electric sound experiences with Dhafer Youssef and Kamal Musallam
- New pop jazz styles with Titi Robin and Toufic Farroukh
- Other acoustic youth experiences with Hamdi Makhlouf, Amine & Hamza M'raihi and Jasser Haj Youssef

=== Arabic rock ===
There have been many Arab rock bands along the years that fused rock, metal and alternative rock sounds with traditional Arab instruments.

Arabic rock has been gaining attention in the Middle East since the early 2000s, with bands such as Tanjaret Daghet, JadaL, Kayan, Autostrad, El Morabba3, Akher Zapheer, The Wanton Bishops, Mashrou' Leila, Adonis and Meen, Cairokee, Massar Egbari, Sahara, Wyvern, Cartoon Killerz, Khalas, Chaos and Acrassicauda all gaining popularity.

Recently, there has been a new wave of bands emerging in the underground scene across the Arab world. These include Shaghaf, Khayal, Sada That, Code Masr and Hawas of Egypt and Ayloul of Lebanon.

== Musical subgenres ==
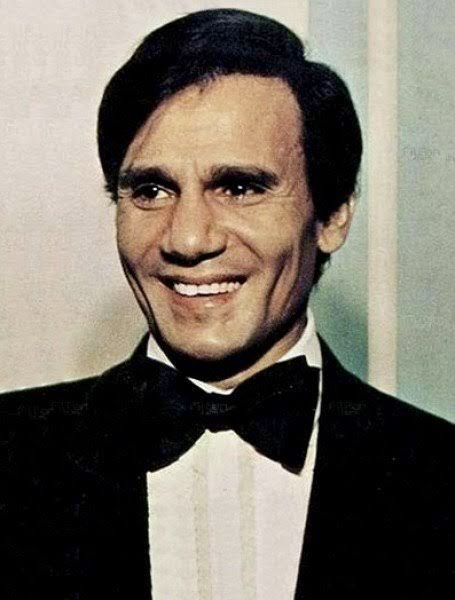
Abdel Halim Hafez (1929–1977), Egyptian leading pop star

Since the early 20th century, modern Arabic music has been influenced by musical trends from Cairo, Egypt. The city is considered one of the important cultural centers in the Arab world. Later innovations in Arabic pop music have also abounded from Morocco to Saudi Arabia. In recent years, Beirut has become an important city where singers may sing in different varieties of Arabic. Other regional styles that have enjoyed popular music status, include:

=== North Africa ===
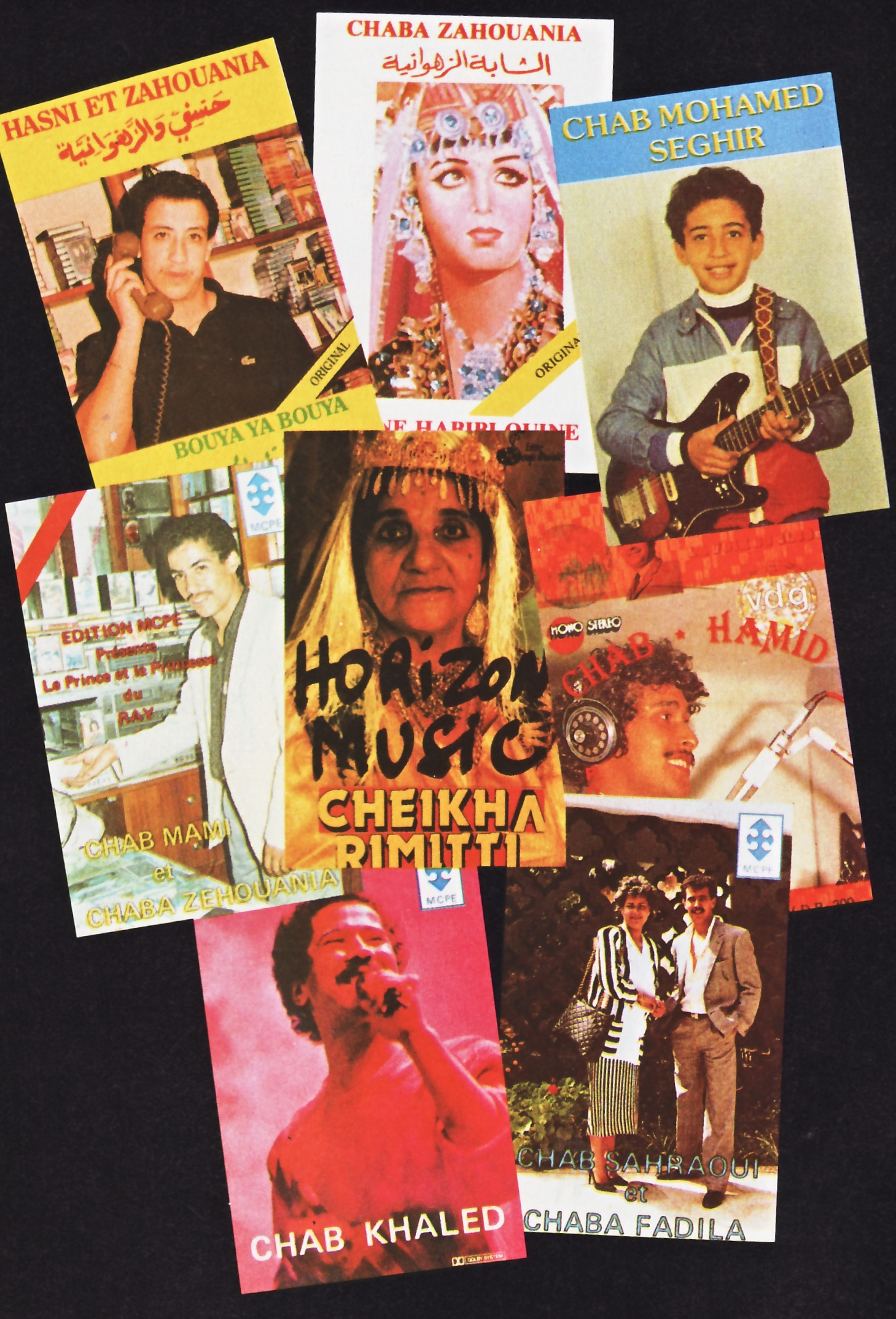
A collection of 1980s Raï albums.

- Raï (Algeria)
- Chaabi (Algeria)
- Chaabi (Morocco)
- Gnawa (Morocco and the southwest of Algeria)
- Al Jeel (Egypt)
- Shaabi music (Egypt)
- Hageeba (Sudan)

=== Arabian Peninsula ===
- Adani
- Dan Hadhrami
- Ardah
- Ardham
- Bandari Khaliji
- Dazah
- Fann at-Tanbura
- Fijiri
- Hadhrami Music
- Khabayti
- Khaliji
- Khuwizaani
- Lahji
- Liwa
- Mizmar
- M'alayah
- Rumba Khaliji
- Samri
- Sana'ani
- Sawt
- Shaabi Khaliji
- Yanbaawi
- Yowlah
- Zafah Khaliji
- Music of Yemen

== Sacred and art music ==
=== Sacred music ===
Arabic religious music includes Christian and Islamic musical traditions. However, Islamic music is structurally equivalent to Arabic secular music, while Christian Arab music has been influenced by Syriac Orthodox, Catholic, Greek Orthodox, Anglican, Coptic, and Maronite church music.

=== Art music ===
Secular art musical genres include maqam al-iraqi, andalusi nubah, muwashshah, Fijiri songs, qasidah, layali, mawwal, taqsim, bashraf, sama'i, tahmilah, dulab, sawt, and liwa.

== Characteristics of Arabic music ==
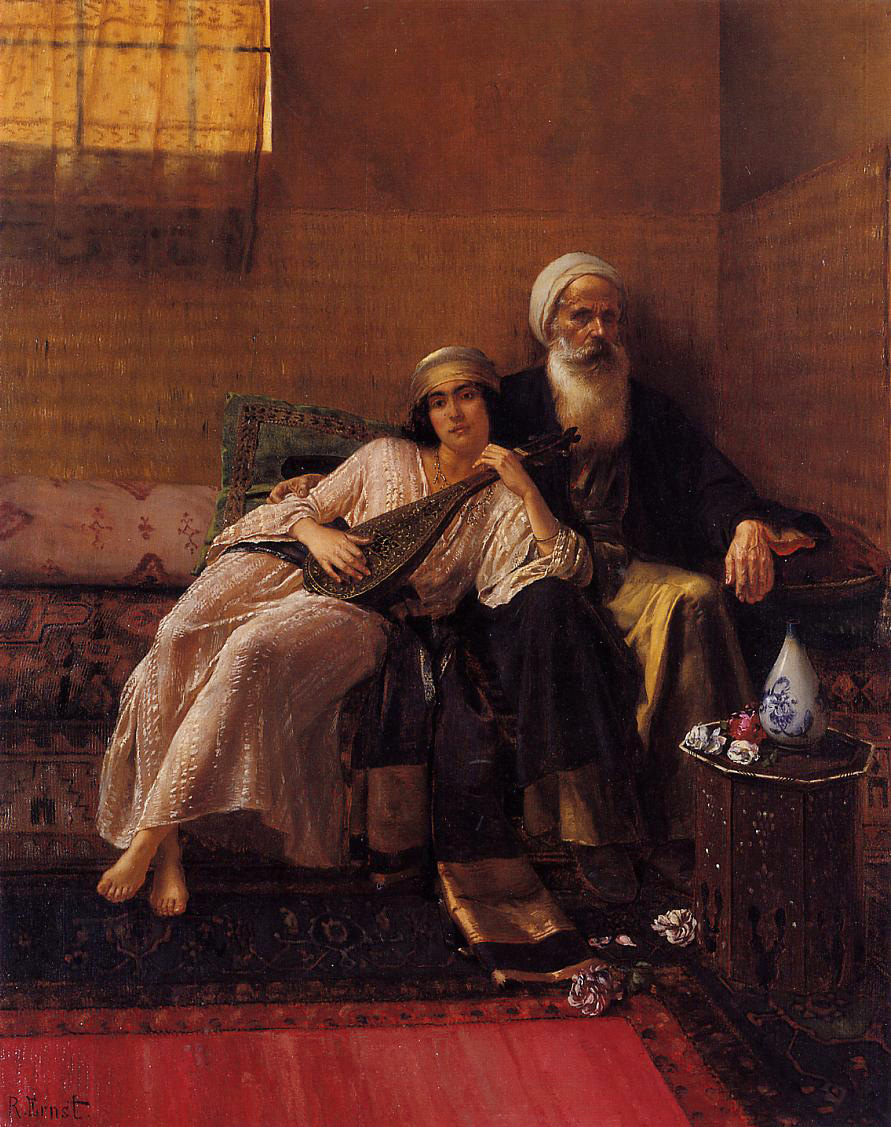
The Musician by Rudolf Ernst.

Much of Arabic music is characterized by an emphasis on melody and rhythm, as opposed to harmony. There are some genres of Arabic music that are polyphonic, but typically, Arabic music is homophonic.

Habib Hassan Touma submits that there are five components that characterize Arabic music:

1. The Arab tone system; that is, a musical tuning system that relies on specific interval structures and was invented by al-Farabi in the 10th century
2. Rhythmic-temporal structures that produce a rich variety of rhythmic patterns, known as awzan or "weight", that are used to accompany metered vocal and instrumental genres, to accent or give them form.
3. A number of musical instruments that are found throughout the Arab world that represent a standardized tone system, are played with generally standardized performance techniques, and display similar details in construction and design.
4. Specific social contexts that produce sub-categories of Arabic music, or musical genres that can be broadly classified as urban (music of the city inhabitants), rural (music of the country inhabitants), or Bedouin (music of the desert inhabitants)..."
5. An Arab musical mentality, "responsible for the esthetic homogeneity of the tonal-spatial and rhythmic-temporal structures throughout the Arab world whether composed or improvised, instrumental or vocal, secular or sacred."

=== Maqam system ===
A Maqam tone level example

The basis of Arabic music is the maqam (pl. maqamat), which looks like the mode, but is not quite the same. The tonic note, dominant note, and ending note (unless modulation occurs) are generally determined by the maqam used. Arabic maqam theory as described in literature over the ages names between 90 and 110 maqams, that are grouped into larger categories known as fasilah. Fasilah are groupings of maqams whose first four primary pitches are shared in common.

==== Ajnas ====
An Ajnas tone level example

The maqam consists of at least two ajnas, or scale segments. Ajnas is the plural form of jins, which in Arabic comes from the Latin word genus, meaning "type". In practice, a jins is either a trichord (three notes), a tetrachord (four notes), or a pentachord (five notes). A maqam usually covers only one octave (usually two ajnas), but can cover more. Like the melodic minor scale, some maqamat use different ajnas when descending and ascending. Due to continuous innovation and the emergence of new ajnas, and because most music scholars have not reached consensus on the subject, a solid figure for the total number of ajnas in use is uncertain. In practice, however, most musicians would agree there are at least eight major ajnas: rast, bayat, sikah, hijaz, saba, kurd, nahawand, and ajam, and commonly used variants such as nakriz, athar kurd, sikah beladi, saba zamzama. For example, Mukhalif is a rare jins (in the Sikah) family used almost exclusively in Iraq, and it is not used in combination with other ajnas.

=== Microtones in Arabic music ===
Unlike the tradition of Western music, Arabic music contains microtones, which are notes that lie between notes in the Western chromatic scale. While notes in the chromatic scale are separated by semitones (or half steps), notes in Arabic music can be separated by quarter tones. In some treatments of theory, the quarter tone scale or all twenty four tones should exist, but according to Yūsuf Shawqī (1969), fewer tones are used in practice.

Additionally, in 1932, at the Cairo Congress of Arab Music held in Cairo, Egypt—and attended by such Western luminaries as Béla Bartók and Henry George Farmer—experiments were done that determined conclusively that the notes in actual use differ substantially from an even-tempered 24-tone scale. Furthermore, the intonation of many of those notes differ slightly from region to region (Egypt, Turkey, Syria, Iraq).

==== Regional scales ====
As a result of these findings, the following recommendation was issued: "The tempered scale and the natural scale should be rejected. In Egypt, the Egyptian scale is to be kept with the values, which were measured with all possible precision. The Turkish, Syrian, and Iraqi scales should remain what they are...." Both in modern practice, and evident in recorded music over the course of the last century, several differently-tuned Es in between the E-flat and E-natural of the Western Chromatic scale are used, that vary according to the types of maqams and ajnas used, and the region in which they are used.

==== Practical treatment ====
Musicians and teachers refer to these in-between notes as quarter tones, using "half-flat" or "half-sharp" as a designation for the in-between flats and sharps, for ease of nomenclature. Performance and teaching of the exact values of intonation in each jins or maqam is usually done by ear. It should also be added, in reference to Habib Hassan Touma's comment above, that these quarter tones are not used everywhere in the maqamat: in practice, Arabic music does not modulate to 12 different tonic areas like the Well-Tempered Klavier. The most commonly used quarter tones are on E (between E and E♭), A, B, D, F (between F and F♯), and C.

=== Vocal traditions ===
Arab classical music is known for its famed virtuoso singers, who sing long, elaborately ornamented, melismatic tunes, coloraturas unheard in any other musical genres and are known for driving audiences into ecstasy. Its traditions come from pre-Islamic times, when female singing slaves entertained the wealthy, inspired warriors on the battlefield with their rajaz poetry, and performed at weddings. A vast number of female Arab vocalists are mezzo-sopranos who cultivate darker and richer tones than generic Soprano voices.

=== Instruments and ensembles ===
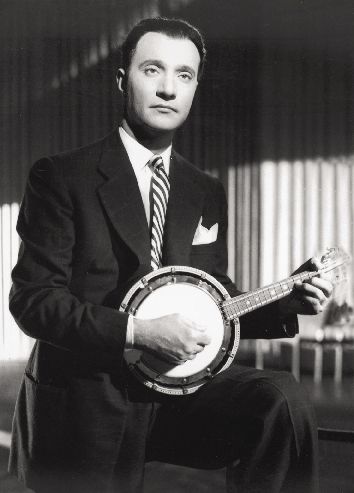
Mohamed Abdel Wahab playing a mandolin-banjo in Ghazal al-Banat.

The prototypical Arabic music ensemble in Egypt and Syria is known as the takht, and includes, (or included at different time periods) instruments such as the 'oud, qānūn, rabab, ney, violin (introduced in the 1840s or 50s), riq and dumbek. In Iraq, the traditional ensemble, known as the chalghi, includes only two melodic instruments—the jowza (similar to the rabab but with four strings) and santur—accompanied by the riq and dumbek. The Arab world has incorporated instruments from the West, including the electric guitar, cello, double bass and oboe, and incorporated influences from jazz and other foreign musical styles.

The singers have remained the stars, however, especially after the development of the recording and film industry in the 1920s in Cairo. These singing celebrities are (or were) the biggest stars in Arabic classic music, they include Farid Al Attrache, Asmahan, Abdel Halim Hafez, Sayed Darwish, Mohamed Abdel Wahab, Warda Al-Jazairia, Wadih El Safi, Fairuz, Sabah, and Umm Kulthum.

== Research and documentation of Arabic music ==
Even though musical traditions in the Arab world have been handed down orally, Arab scholars Al-Kindi, Abulfaraj or Al-Farabi and later Safi al-Din published treatises in Arabic music since at least the 9th century AD. In 1932, the first Congress of Arab Music was held in Cairo, where scholarship about the past, present and future of Arabic music was presented both from Western as well as Arab experts. The results were later documented, both in writing as well as in the form of audio recordings.

Research on Arabic music is a focus of departments of ethnomusicology at universities worldwide, and the global interest in World music has led to a growing number of studies and re-issues of historic recordings by independent researchers or private companies.

Making use of digital archives for texts, pictures and sounds, detailed information on the history of Arabic music is also made accessible over the Internet. The Lebanese foundation AMMAR, for example, is committed to the preservation and dissemination of traditional Arab music and has published a host of historical documents.

== See also ==
- Arabic poetry
- Byzantine music
- Egyptian Music
- Durood
- Hamd
- Islamic music
- Islamic poetry
- Mawlid
- Mehfil
- Middle Eastern music
- Music of Africa
- Music of Asia
- Music of Southeastern Europe
- Na'at
- Nasheed
- North African music
- Pizmonim
- Sufi music
- Sufi poetry
- Sufism
- History of Sufism
- Arabic Oud House
- Amsterdam Andalusian Orchestra
- Arabic pop music
