= Arabic rock =

Music genre of the Arab world

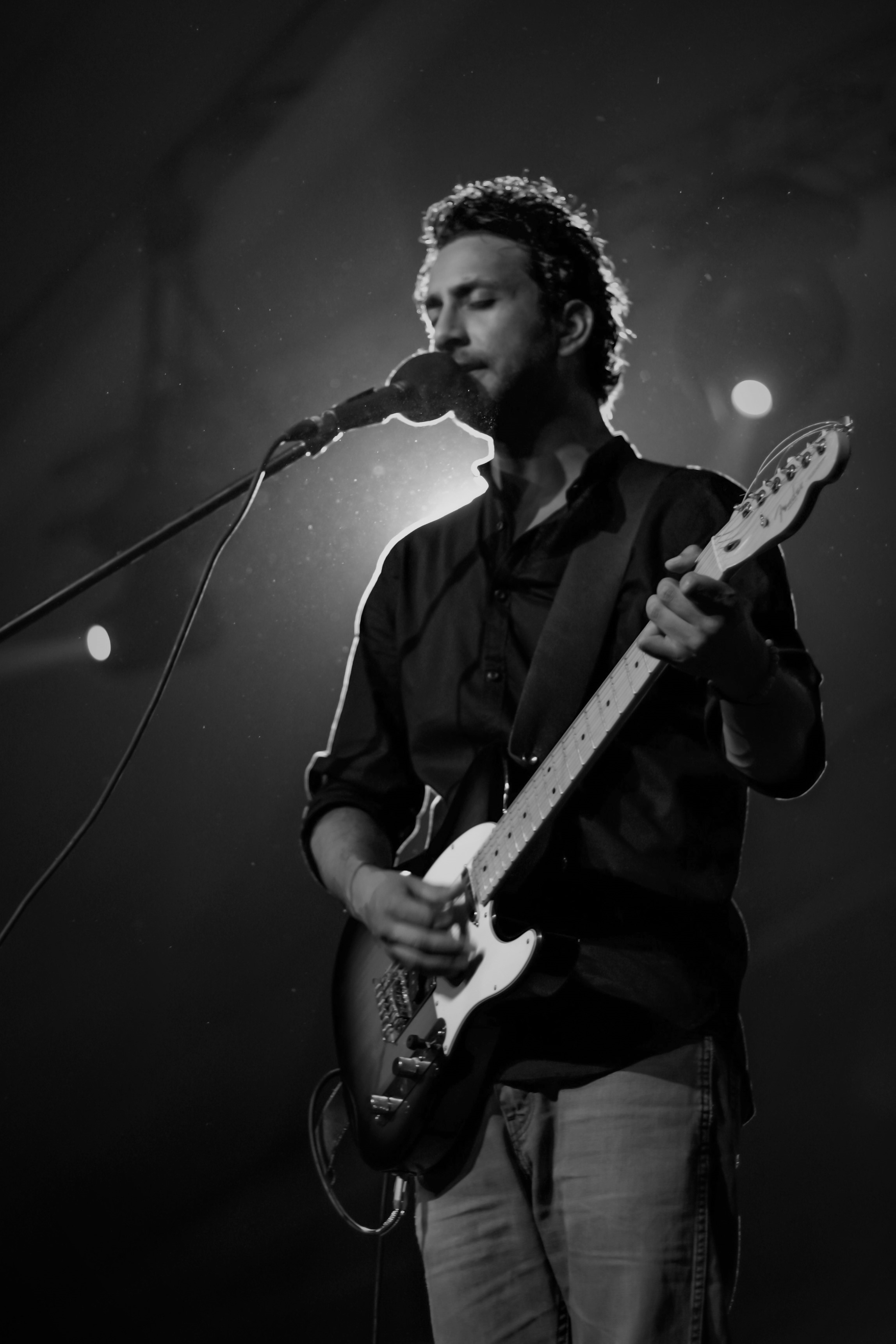
Mahmoud Radaideh, founder of JadaL, performing in 2014

Arabic rock describes a wide variety of forms of music made in the Arab world.

There were few Arabic rock bands in the late 20th century, with the notable exception of The Seaders (known as "Lebanon's Beatles") founded in the early 1960s, the psychedelic and Brazilian influenced trio Ferkat Al Ard (also from Lebanon) in the 1970s, and enigmatic Saudi band Sound Of Ruby in the 1990s. However, the alternative music scene boomed in the 21st century with the creation of popular bands like The Kordz, Mashrou' Leila, Lumi, Meen, The Wanton Bishops and the all-female experimental band Sanam (Lebanon), Inversion (Saudi Arabia) and JadaL and Jabal Al-Mareikh (Jordan). While JadaL is considered to the be the first to adopt "Arab rock" as a specific genre name, many Arab musicians have adopted musical forms foreign to Arab culture, like rock music, and have attempted to arabize them.
