= Akher Zapheer =

Jordanian rock band

Akher Zapheer آخر زفير (Arabic Name)
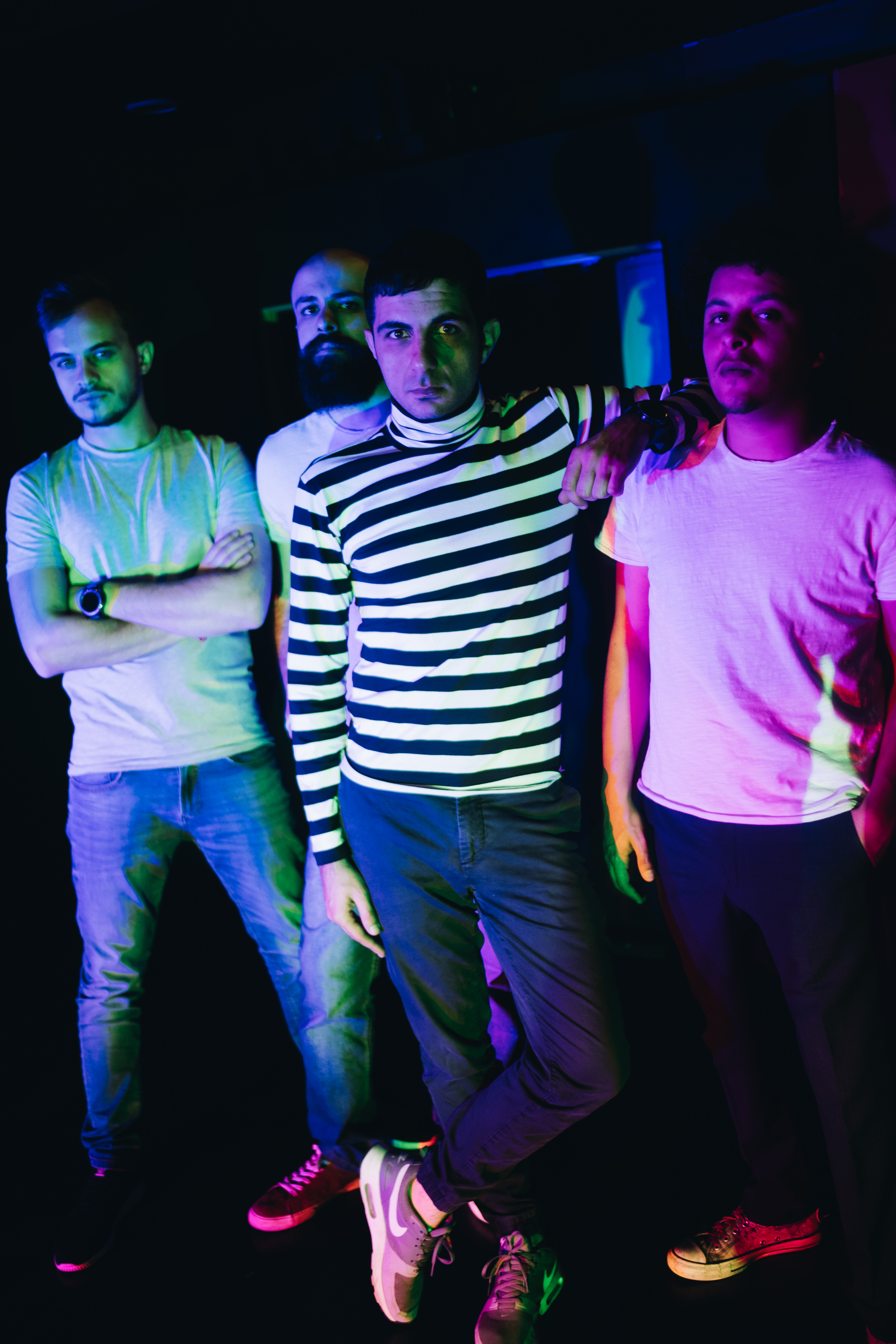
- Akher Zapheer

Background information
- Origin: Amman, Jordan
- Genres: Alternative rock; grunge; rock; hard rock; punk rock
- Years active: 2007–present
- Label: Independent
- Members: Basem Sayej; Rami Alqasem; Amr Abukhalaf; Masis Mardirossian
- Website: www.akherzapheer.com

Akher Zapheer (Arabic: أخِر زَفير meaning Last Exhale) is a Jordanian grunge Arabic rock band from Amman, Jordan, formed in late 2007. The band was founded by vocalist and guitarist Basem Sayej who has been the only constant member throughout multiple line-up changes. The current line-up since 2020 consists of Basem Sayej alongside Rami Alqasem (bass guitar), Amr Abukhalaf (lead guitar) and Masis Mardirossian (drummer)

== History ==
=== Formation and debut album (2007–2012) ===
Akher Zapheer's frontman Basem Sayej discovered his passion towards music at an early age mentioning that he started writing songs when he was 12 and kept writing during his adolescence before forming the band. The band's name, which means "Last Exhale" simply refers to the relief after getting things off chest. Basem Sayej also mentioned that the name was inspired by Kurt Cobain's exhale while performing Nirvana's "Where Did You Sleep Last Night". Basem co-founded Akher Zapheer with his childhood friend and neighbor, guitarist Salem Dallal. Basem said that he used to write songs in English, then he stopped and starting writing in Arabic instead. Basem and Salem kept writing songs until they met drummer Kayed Qunibi and then they started jamming together at Kayed's building which made them face troubles with the neighbors, so they moved their instruments into Mohamed Salem's library in one of Amman's loudest and busiest streets so no one could be annoyed by their jams. The band's first bassist was Mohammad Awwad who was originally a guitarist but he agreed to turn into Bass in order to join the band. Akher Zapheer kept rehearsing together until they met sound engineer and musical producer Sari Abuladel who liked their music and decided to make an album with the band. Akher Zapheer started working on the new album besides performing live shows which helped building a fanbase for the Jordanian rockers. The bassist Mohammad Awwad left the band between 2009 and 2010 and was replaced by bassist Yazan Risheq.

In 2011, Akher Zapheer released their hit and most successful song to the day "Akherto Lahen Hazeen" as a video clip. It was the first single from their debut album Converse Culture. Starting from October 2012, Akher Zapheer started releasing their album which consisted of 11 songs as a song per day. On January 2, 2013, Akher Zapheer released "Arba’ Seneen" the final song of their album as a video clip.

"Converse Culture" was well received by the audience and helped the band to expand its fanbase and become one of the best bands in the alternative scene.

At late 2013, Akher Zapheer released an acoustic version of their new single "Bein el waraq" which featured only Basem Sayej and Yazan Risheq on acoustic guitars.

=== Hiatus (2013-2016) - (2016-2018) ===
Akher Zapheer took a break for 3 years due to Basem's engagement outside of Jordan. Basem took advantage of these 3 years writing new material for their new album Emm Elmousiqa. The band reformed in 2016 with 3 new members: bassist Rami Alqasem, guitarist Amr Abukhlaif drummer Motaz Almasri, replacing the former ones to start promoting for their new album.

The new formation of the band performed four live shows together between Jordan and Egypt before going on a hiatus once again for 2 years.

=== Comeback and new music (2018- ) ===
In September 2018, a shocking comeback was announced when Akher Zapheer's name headlined Egyptian music festival "Music Park 2". The band returned with the same members. The band mentioned during its first interaction with the fans after the comeback that as soon as they are done with "Music Park 2" they are gonna be fully active and will start working on their new album Emm Elmousiqa. Basem Sayej also added that he wrote new material in 2018 for a 3rd album that will be named Tho3ban.

On October 5, 2018, Akher Zapheer performed at Music Park festival for an epic comeback performance. The setlist featured songs from their debut album Converse Culture and their next 2 albums Emm Elmousiqa and Tho’ban. In March 2019, It was announced that Akher Zapheer are participating in Redbull Soundclash in Egypt playing against Jordanian band Autostrad on April 4 of the same year.

Akher Zapheer showed a huge talent at Redbull Soundclash and their performance was admired by those who attended the show as they played a couple of their songs on the Warm-up round. They covered Egyptian veteran Mohamed Mounir's " Ashky Lmeen", turning it into a rock tune on "The Cover" round. Akher Zapheer's performance witnessed their talent in playing different genres other than rock such as Jazz, Reggae and Electronic.

In May 2019, photos of Akher Zapheer in the rehearsal room showed Masis Mardirossian on drums replacing Motaz Almasri who left the band. Masis played his very first live performance with Akher Zapheer on PPTT Red Online Concert. The band's performance featured 3 of their big hits in addition to a new song named "Kaslan".

In June 2019, Akher Zapheer performed in the celebration of Europe Day in Jordan.

In July 2019, Akher Zapheer headlined Jordanian music festival "Redbull Local Vocals".

In August 2019, Akher Zapheer Played an epic sold out show in Alexandria. The band's performance was 2 hours long and the setlist contained 22 songs.

In October 2019, Akher Zapheer played their very first gig in Lebanon.

=== Emm Elmousiqa and live gigs ===
On January 3, 2020, Akher Zapheer released a video clip of their new song Metfaje’ as the first single of their new album "Emm Elmousiqa".

Emm Elmousiqa is the band's second studio album that came after 8 years from the release of their debut album Converse Culture. The 2nd album was released as singles and contained 10 songs.

On January 9, Akher Zapheer headlined the Middle East Music Event in Egypt.

On March 5, Akher Zapheer played an epic sold-out show at Elsawy Culture Wheel in Egypt.

=== Tho3ban 2022 ===
On June 8, Akher Zapheer released the song "Shakhsi El da’em" as the first single from their third studio album Tho3ban.

Shakshi El da'em's video clip was shot in Beirut and was directed by Basem's sister, Sandra Sayej.

On June 14, Akher Zapheer released Urtuwazi as the second single of Tho3ban. The footage of Urtuwazi's video clip was fully generated by Artificial Intelligence, the first of its kind in the Middle East.

On June 17, Akher Zapheer released their third studio album Tho3ban, containing 7 tracks.

== Musical style, lyrical themes and influences ==
Throughout its career, Akher Zapheer has been described as Alternative rock, Grunge, Hard rock, Punk rock. The band's musical style is hugely influenced and driven by the grunge scene in Seattle. The band has mentioned that they have been influenced by many bands such as: Nirvana, Duman, Radiohead, Deftones, Muse, Placebo, Arctic Monkeys, Slipknot and Dream Theater.

Akher Zapheer songs are all written by Basem Sayej. The band's lyrics are mainly melancholic and enraged.

Akher Zapheer lyrics tackle social issues, political issues, love and depression. Basem Sayej mentioned that all the lyrics are inspired by true events that influenced him to write about. Sayej discussed his writing process mentioning that he always has to be sad in order to write new songs and he has never been able to write new songs while he was happy.

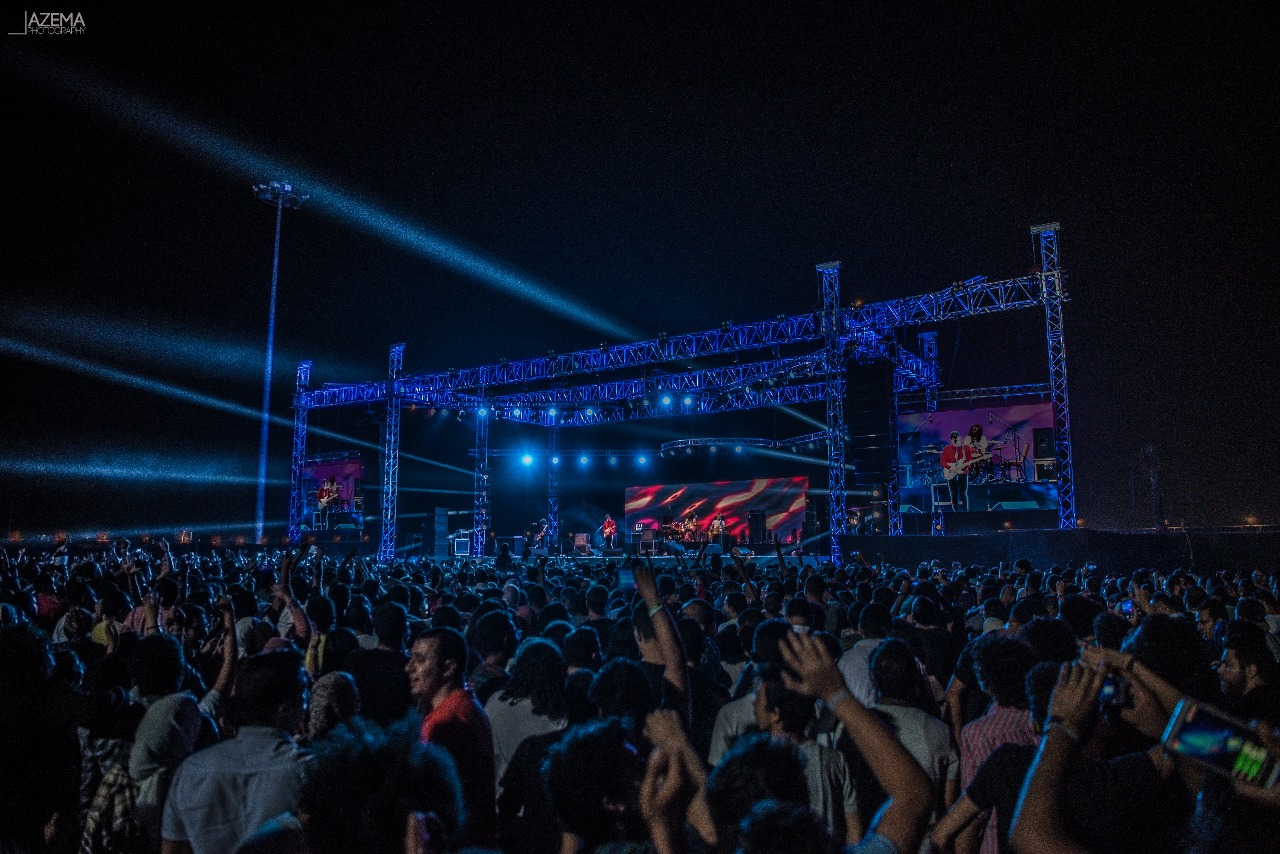
Music Park 2018

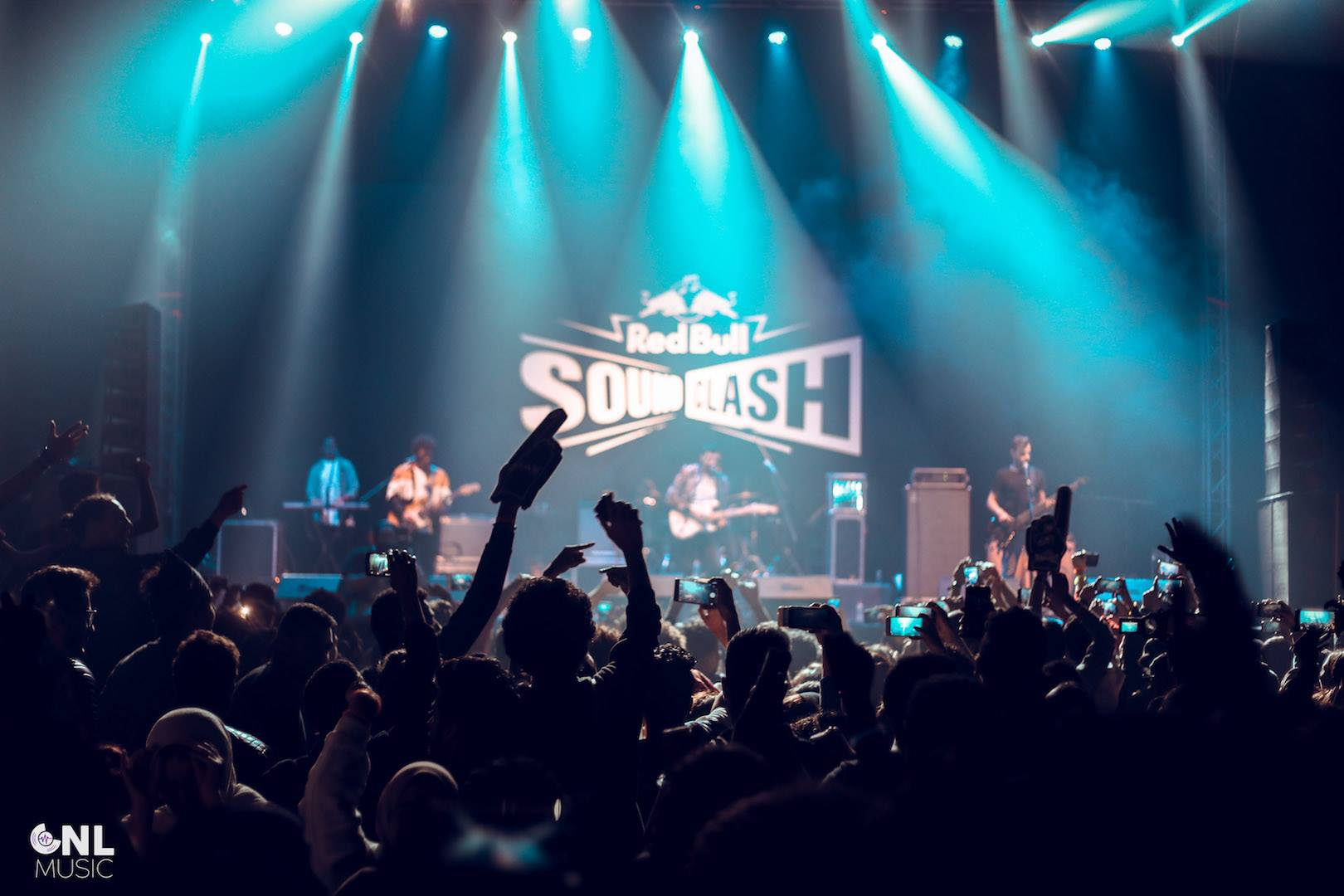
Soundclash 2019

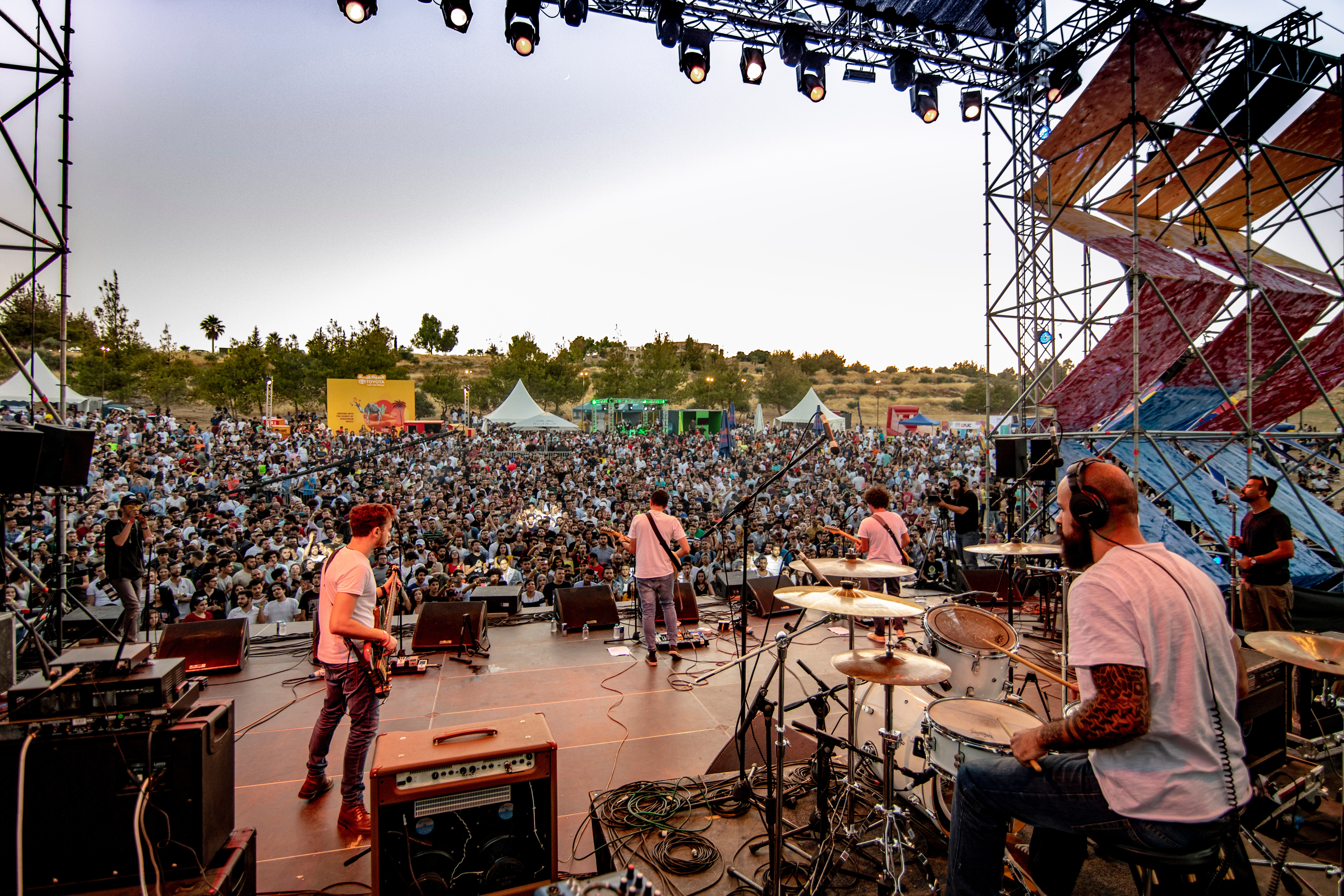
Redbull Local Vocals 2019

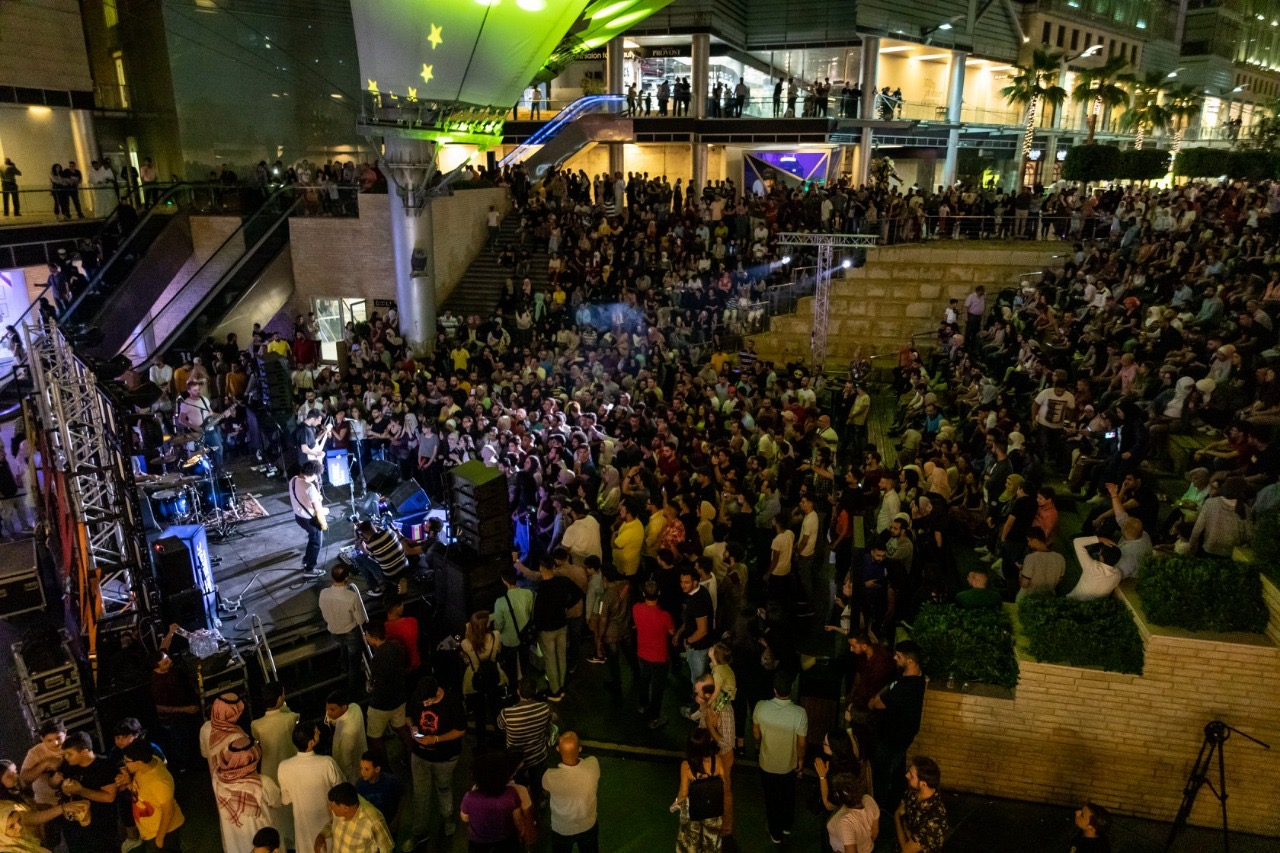
Akher Zapheer at the Boulevard 2019

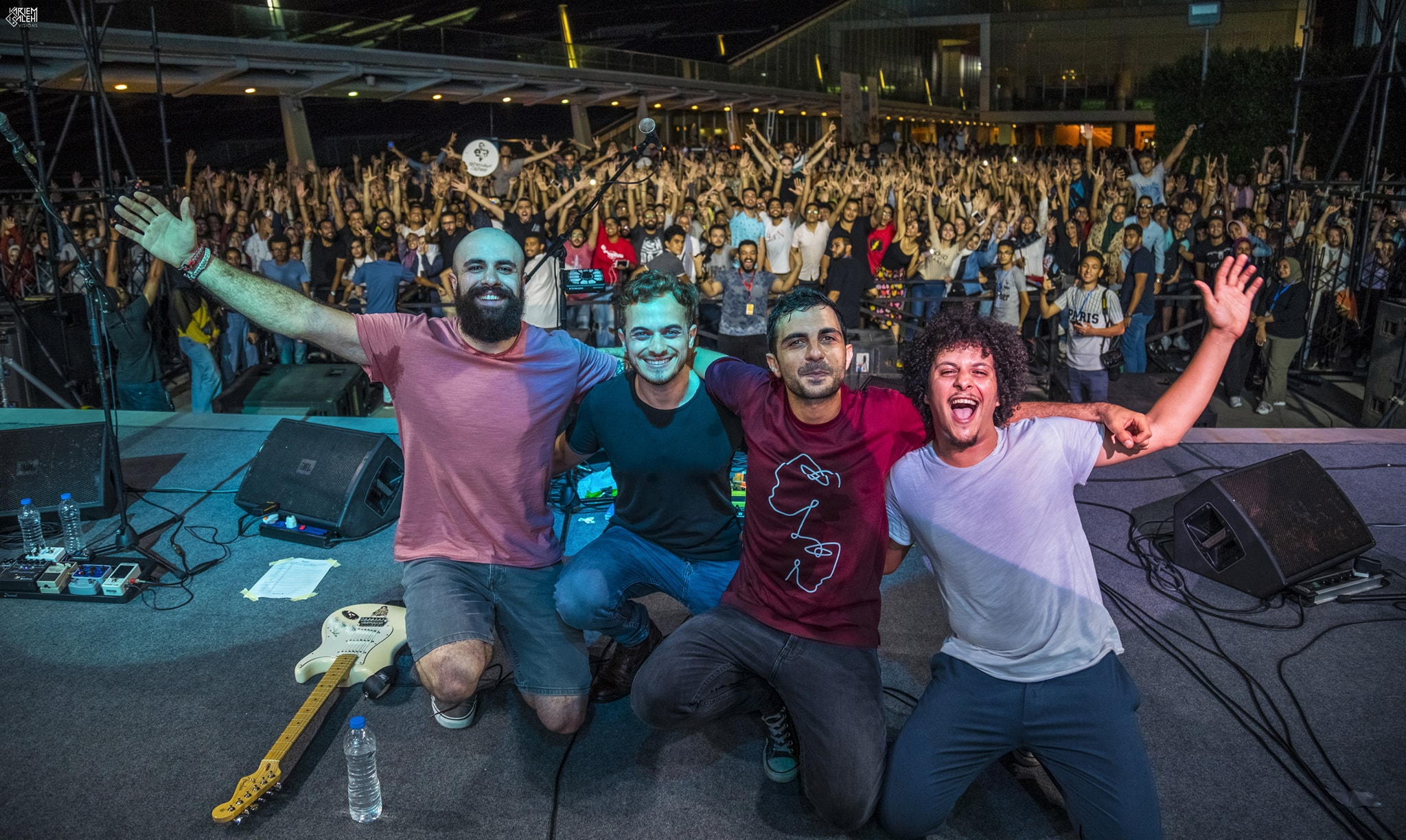
Alexandria 2019

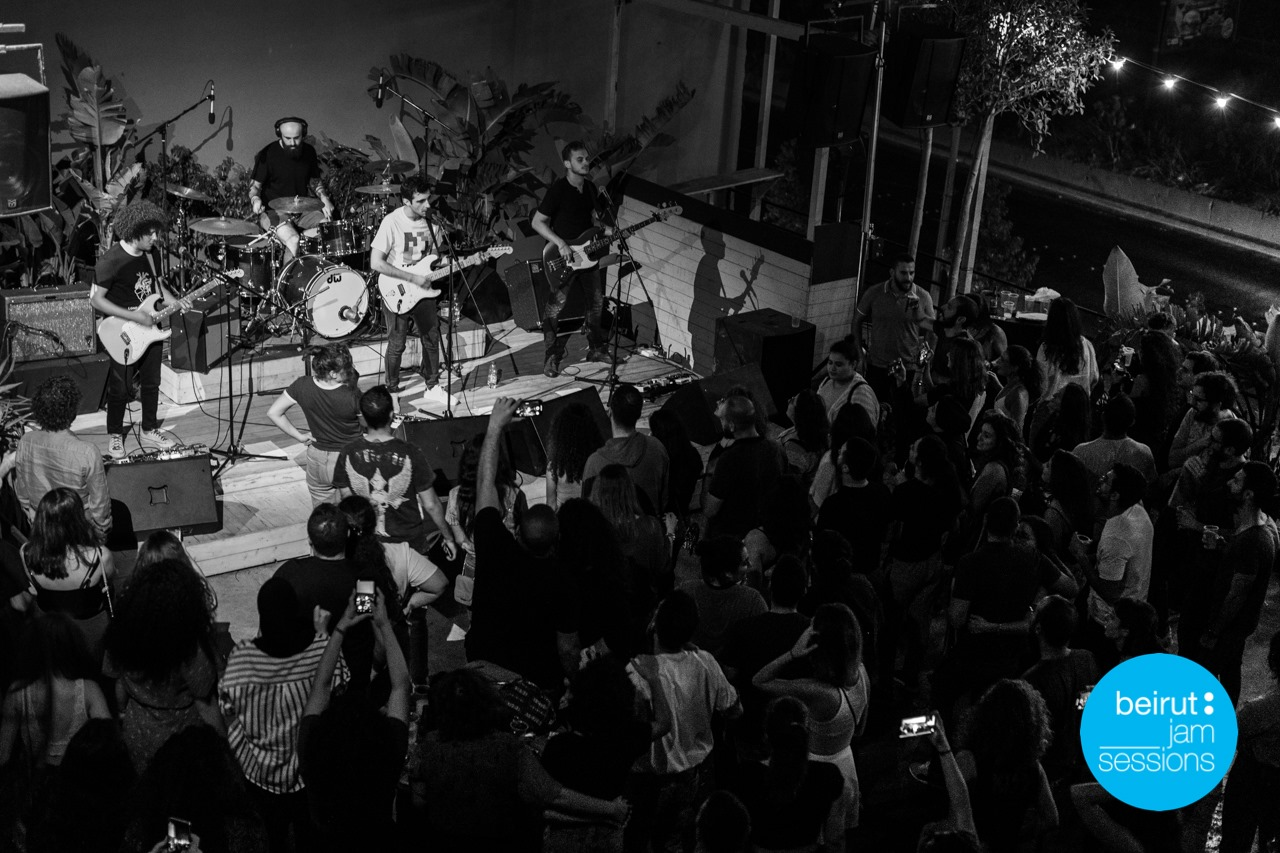
Beirut 2019

== Members ==
Present

- Basem Sayej - electric guitar and vocals (2007–Present)
- Rami Alqasem - Bass guitar (2016–Present)
- Amr Abukhlif - Lead guitar (2018–Present)
- Masis Mardirossian - Drums (2019–present)

Past

- Mohammad Awwad - Bass Guitar (2007-2009)
- Kayed Qunibi - Drums (2007 - 2013)
- Salem Dallal - Lead Guitar (2007-2013)
- Yazan Risheq - Bass guitar (2009-2013)
- Motaz Almasri - Drums (2016-2019)

== Discography ==
=== Albums ===
- Converse Culture (2012)
- Emm El Mousiqa (2020)
- Tho3ban (2022)
- Mesh Fann (2023)
