= Momken =

Studio album by Mohamed Mounir
- Released: 1995
- Recorded: Digitec Studio (Cairo, Egypt)
- Genre: Pop
- Label: Digitec (disbanded)

Mohamed Mounir chronology
Eftah Albak (1994)	Momken (1995)	Men Awel Lamsa (1997)

Momken ("Possible") (Arabic: ممكن) is a 1995 studio album by Mohamed Mounir.

== Track listing ==
Standard version
No.	Title	Writer(s)	Music Producer/Arranger	Length
1.	"El-Leila Deya"	Abdel Rahman el-Abnudi, Amr Mahmoud	Amr Mahmoud	3:34
2.	"Nazra Wahda"	Hamdy Eid, Hamdy Raouf	Ashraf Mahrous	4:02
3.	"Hawadeet"	Magdy Naguib, Ahmed Mounib	Mahrous	3:38
4.	"Burg Hamam"	Hassan Reyadh, Medhat El-Kholy	Amr Abuzekry	4:33
5.	"Ya Bent Yally" (Folklore)	Kawthar Mustafa (Lyrics)	A.Mahmoud	4:31
6.	"Sheta"	Kawthar Mustafa, Hussien Gasser	A.Mahmoud	4:13
7.	"Momken"	Naguib, Wagih Aziz	Abuzekry	3:53
8.	"Agmal Hekaya"	Kawthar Mustafa, Agmal Hekaya	A.Mahmoud	4:11

== Personnel ==
- Accordion – Farouk Mohamed
- Bass guitar – Romany Krishna
- Guitar – Tarek Hamouda, Amr Paulino, Mohamed Mabrouk
- Duff – Salim Sha'rawy, Mohamed Laziz
- Kavala – Ibrahim Fathy
- Mixed by – Amr Mahmoud, Mohamed Sakr
- Oud – Hussein Saber
- Percussion – Ayman Sedky, Khaled Gomaa
- Violin – Mounir Nasr El-din
