= Te3b (Mohamed Mounir song) =

2026 song by Mohamed Mounir

Song by Mohamed Mounir
- Released: 2026
- Genre: Arabic music
- Songwriter: Ahmed Shabaka
- Composer: Ahmed Hamdy Raouf

Te3b (Arabic: تعب) is a song performed by Egyptian singer Mohamed Mounir. The song was written by Ahmed Shabaka and composed by Ahmed Hamdy Raouf. It was released in 2026 as the opening theme of the Egyptian television series Had Aqsa.

== Background ==
The song was produced as the opening theme for the Egyptian drama series Had Aqsa, which aired during the Ramadan 2026 television season. The music was composed by Egyptian composer Ahmed Hamdy Raouf, with lyrics written by Ahmed Shabaka, and performed by Mohamed Mounir.

The release of the song marked Mohamed Mounir's return to performing theme songs for television dramas.

== Credits ==
- Vocals – Mohamed Mounir
- Lyrics – Ahmed Shabaka
- Composition – Ahmed Hamdy Raouf
