= Arabic Rocks =

Studio album by JadaL
- Released: August 8, 2009
- Genre: Rock, Alternative Rock
- Length: 59:42
- Language: Arabic
- Label: eka3
- Producer: Mahmoud Radaideh

JadaL chronology
Arabic Rocks (2009)	El Makina (2012)

Arabic Rocks is the debut studio album by the Jordanian Arabic rock band JadaL, released through eka3 records in August 2009. It contains 14 songs in JadaL's Arabic Rock Style. The album showcases a myriad of subgenres of rock from the emo-rock of Bayya’ El Kastana, the flamenco rock on Galbi Metlel Ward to the rap rock on Ya Bani Adam.

== Track listing ==
No.	Title	Length
1.	"Iss" (Instrumental)	1:46
2.	"Salma"	2:34
3.	"Ya Bani Adam (feat. Dam)"	3:11
4.	"Omr Jdid"	5:24
5.	"Ya Ahla O'yoon"	4:47
6.	"El-Tobah (Abdel Halim Hafez Cover)"	5:09
7.	"Min Shaf Habibi"	5:04
8.	"Nyalek"	4:05
9.	"El-Daraweesh"	3:19
10.	"La Tloum"	5:14
11.	"Galbi Metlel Ward"	5:07
12.	"Nsit Ahla Thekra"	5:24
13.	"Bayya' El Kastana"	3:19
14.	"Rah Bakkir"	5:19
Total length:		59:42
