= Music of Lebanon =

The music of Lebanon has a long history. Beirut, the capital city of Lebanon, has long been known, especially in a period immediately following World War II, for its art and intellectualism. Several singers emerged in this period, among some of the most famous Fairuz, Sabah, Zaki Nassif, and Wadih El Safi.

During the fifteen-year civil war and the Israeli occupation of Lebanon, most of the Lebanese music stars moved to Cairo or Paris, with a large music scene in Beirut only returning after 1992. Modern pop stars include Najwa Karam, Maya Diab, Nawal Al Zoghbi, Elissa, Ragheb Alama, Haifa Wehbe, Nancy Ajram, Myriam Fares, Wael Jassar, and more. While traditional folk music is important to Lebanese music, other styles like rock, house and electronic music have gained popularity in Lebanon with the rise of Arabic influence in these music genres. Consequently, new Lebanese record labels have emerged to support artists in a variety of music styles. Music has also been used as a tool in Lebanon's revolutions. Lebanese music is also characterized by its use of string and percussion instruments.

== Traditional music in Lebanon ==
Traditional Lebanese music shares influences with nearby countries including Syria and Egypt. Beirut music also features similarities with Bedouin tradition as well as folk music from Lebanon’s more rural regions. The capital's secular music was heavily shaped by the Ottomans and music guilds offering some form of protection to artists despite Lebanese society's view of them coming from a lower status.

Lebanese folk music features Aramaean, Byzantine and later Islamic styles of music found across the Levant, with significant religious influences. Key features include poetic and rhythmic tunes that have a typically unison melody sung solo or with a group. Zajal poetry is considered one of the most well-known forms of traditional music in Lebanon as well as other styles like ma'anna, a part of the melismatic and syllabic music type, and qarrâdi known for its charming village feel. These music styles are often paired with dabke and feature a range of popular instruments in Lebanon.

Nahda Music (1885-1940), translating to "Arab Renaissance" is attempted to be revived through Tajdīd min al-Dakhil translating to "Renewal from Within" which is an effort in preserving traditional music that has gained support in Lebanon after 2009. Supported by the Music Institute at Antonine University and the Arabic Music Archiving and Research (AMAR) Foundation, the group was centered on recovering Nahda performances, styles and instruments. Specifically, they have collected music records, reels and wax cylinders from across the Middle East including Lebanon in an effort to preserve traditional music.

== Influence of international popular music in Lebanon ==
Rock is very popular in Lebanon and during the Lebanese Civil War, Ziad Rahbani, a Lebanese composer (and Fairuz's son) worked with different types of music groups in Beirut including rock, jazz and funk. Rock was a popular genre of music played by radio stations in Beirut, with The Rolling Stones, The Beatles and The Kinks being especially popular at the time. Local rock bands were also created such as The Force, which performed despite political tension.

The underground music scene became vibrant in Lebanon after the end of the civil war in 1990, spearheaded by the rock-pop duo Zeid Hamdan and Yasmine Hamdan who together were known as Soap Kills. This duo was considered revolutionary for their time as they used grooveboxes, synthesisers and vocals in their pieces while blending Western and Arab influences.

In 2011, Lebanese rock band The Kordz released their debut album Beauty and the East. The band has performed as the opening act for high-profile artists including Placebo, Robert Plant and Deep Purple and has toured internationally, performing concerts in England (at Musexpo Europe 2009), Dubai, Canada, the Czech Republic and Germany. The mid 2010s featured a new emergence of artists such as those in indie or alternative rock including Mashrou' Leila who has an openly gay lead singer and discusses sexuality as well politics in the lyrics of their songs. IJK (singer songwriter) is another Lebanese rock singer increasingly recording in the West and releasing material in English.

Beirut has also been known for its club culture which has featured electronic and house music since the 1990s. Typically, it was more European inspired music but musicians such as Jessika Khazrik, a Berlin based Lebanese DJ, have been combining sounds from Lebanon into their music. Arabic-inspired house music is described to have started in the early 2000s with Said Mrad being one of the first through his remix of Umm Kulthum's, Alf Laila wa Laila. The popularity of Afro-house has also entered the Lebanese music scene. International DJs such as Keinmusik's remix of Arabic songs like Nour el Ein have continued to popularize this type of music in Lebanon.

== Lebanese record labels ==
Baidaphon was a Lebanese-owned record company, established by the Baida family in the 20th century. It was founded in Berlin, where Michel Baida alongside his two cousins Butrus, Jibran, and Farajallah, a Lebanese recording artist, had sealed a business deal with a German company. Baidaphon recordings were made in Berlin and marketed and sold in Beirut. With the help of European engineers, the label began recording in Lebanon in 1907. By the mid 1920s Baidaphon had offices across the Arab world, becoming an important Middle Eastern record company. Mail-order businesses, located in Berlin, sold items to European markets and reached North and South American markets as well. In the early 1930s, the partners split apart after the death of Butrus Baida. The Egyptian singer and composer Mohammed Abdel Wahab became the new partner and helped transform the Egyptian branch of the company, by naming it “Cairophone Records” in the 1940s. Meanwhile, Baidaphon had expanded its influence in the Levant and North African regions.

The Lebanese electronic music label, Thawra Records was developed by Red Bull Music Academy and producer Etyen in 2019 with the mission of giving voices to local artists. Beirut Records, founded by Hiba Abou Haidar helps support Lebanese rappers.

== Music in revolution ==
Before the Civil War music was popularized through musical theater and music festivals or events. However, approaching the Lebanese civil war, music was used as a tool in revolution and distributed through cassettes for wider reach. Different political sects even used music to rally supporters.

During the 2019 protests, revolutionary music was used as a tool to resist the government. DJ Madi Karimeh, was one of the artists who performed in Tripoli while protesters were in the streets transforming these revolutions into party-like events. He combined nationalist songs with techno beats attracting attention from the youth and Lebanese diaspora to these protests. El Rass is another Lebanese musician who produced Arabic rap often played in protests and wrote new songs criticizing the Lebanese government while outlining the protesters' hopes. The revival of older Lebanese songs have found their place in the October 17 revolution including "Ghabet Shams el-Hak" translating to the sun of justice has gone down, originally composed decades prior. In addition to "Nehna el-Sawra wel-Ghadab" translating to we are the revolution and the anger composed by Nabil Abu Abdo and Julia Boutros' brother Ziad Boutrous. Beyond the use of entire songs in revolution were also chants, one famously being "Kellon Yaani Kellon" translating to all of them means all of them in reference to all the Lebanese politicians being told to step down.

== Instruments of Lebanon ==
- Oud
- Mijwiz
- Tablah
- Daf
- Buzuq
- Qanun

== See also ==
- Culture of Lebanon
- Chalga
- Pop-folk
- Arabic music
- Arabic pop music
- Mizrahi music
- Laiko
- Coma Dance Festival
- Beirut Jam Sessions

== Notes ==
- Badley, Bill and Zein al Jundi. "Europe Meets Asia". 2000. In Broughton, Simon and Ellingham, Mark with McConnachie, James and Duane, Orla (Ed.), World Music, Vol. 1: Africa, Europe and the Middle East, pp 391–395. Rough Guides Ltd, Penguin Books.
