= Duman =

Duman is a Turkish given name and surname. Notable people with the surname include:

== People ==
- Aslı Duman (born 1992), Turkish female water polo player
- Ayşenur Duman (born 1999), Turkish female Olympian cross-country skier
- Besra Duman (born 2001), Turkish Paralympic powerlifter
- Hatice Duman (born 1974), Turkish female journalist and editor
- Hatice Duman (table tennis) (born 1994), Turkish para table tennis player
- Nikol Duman (1867–1914), Armenian fedayee
- Nurduran Duman (born 1974), Turkish poet, writer, essayist, translator
- Osman Kürşat Duman (born 1987), Turkish footballer
- Ronald Duman, American medical researcher
- Ronnie Duman (1929–1968), American racecar driver
- Sibel Duman (born 1990), Turkish female footballer

== See also ==
- Duman (band), Turkish rock band
- Duman, Çan
- Duman, Karaçoban
- Duman, Susurluk, a village in Turkey
- Duman, Islamabad, a town in Pakistan
- The Duman River, which flows between Russia and North Korea
- Duman, a variant of pinipig in Philippine cuisine
