= JadaL =

Jordanian "Arab rock" band, formed in 2003

JadaL جَدلْ
- JadaL Logo

Background information
- Origin: Amman, Jordan
- Genres: Arabic rock; indie rock; alternative rock
- Years active: 2003–present
- Labels: Unsigned, past labels: Eka3
- Members: Mahmoud Radaideh; Bader AlHelalat; Lutfi Malhass; Saif Abuhamdan; Guest Performers: Ahmad Farah; Qais Raja; Qased Othman; Chris Mullender
- Past members: Kamel Almani; Hakam Abu Soud; Yazan Risheq; Ahmad Zou'bi; Laith Nimri; Rami Delshad; Hani Mezian; Maen Hijazeen; Amjad Shahrour; Ammar Urabi
- Website: Official Website; Official Fan Page

Jadal (English: Controversy) (Arabic: جدل) is a Jordanian Arabic Rock band and music project from Amman, Jordan, formed in 2003 by Composer/Music Producer/Guitarist Mahmoud Radaideh, which has held various members over the years.

== Biography ==
Jadal has four studio albums released, their latest was released on 24 September 2021 and was called La Tlou' El Daw, contained 11 tracks, composed, written and produced by Mahmoud Radaideh and Jude Hamoud.

When Jadal released their first single ‘El Tobah’ (Repentance), a cover of Abdul Halim Hafez’s legendary love song, their musical style, coined as Arabic Rock, was described as ‘groundbreaking’ due to its unique blend of rock and Arabic, or more specifically Jordanian, lyrics.

Jadal then released their first original single, Salma that Mahmoud Radaideh wrote and composed for his niece, which quickly became a radio hit and gained many followers, thus cementing JadaL ‘as one of the premier Arabic rock bands in the country and the region’. Shortly after, Jadal’s debut album 'Arabic Rocks' was released in 2009, the members back then consisted of Mahmoud Radaideh (Guitars, Compositions), Kamel Almani (Bass, Compositions), Rami Delshad (Vocals) and Laith Nimri (Drums). The album was well-received, staying true to their principles and ‘polished’ rock sound. Produced by Mahmoud Radaideh & Hanna Gargour, the album also featured Palestinian Hip-hop artist DAM (band) on the track ‘Ya Bani Adam’ (Ya Human Being).

In 2011 a new single was released, 'Bye Bye 3azizi' (Arabic: باي باي عزيزي) (Bye Bye My Dear), written and composed by Mahmoud Radaideh and main vocals performed by Ahmad Zoubi.

The second album 'El Makina' (Arabic: الماكينه) was released Dec 2012, composed written and produced by Mahmoud Radaideh, performed by: Vocals:Ahmad Zoubi, Mahmoud Radaideh. Acoustic Drums: Ammar Urabi. Bass: Amjad Shahrour, Keyboards and Synthesisers: Bader Helalat, Mahmoud Radaideh, Hani Mezian. Guitars: Mahmoud Radaideh. Mixed by: David Scott. Recorded at Sweetspot Sound works studios in Amman.

The third album Malyoun was released in Jul 2016, here is when Mahmoud Radaideh performed the vocals solely on the album. The album was performed by, Mahmoud Radaideh: vocals, guitars, synths, electric beats. Bader Helalat: Keyboard. Yazan Risheq: Bass guitar. Hakam Abu Soud: Drums.

Malyoun was a success, with hit songs such as Malyoun, Yumain O leila, Ashrar and others.

== Discography ==
=== Albums ===
- Arabic Rocks (2009)
- El Makina (2012)
- Malyoun (2016)
- La Tlou' El Daw (2021)
- Hami Barid (2025)

== See also ==
- Music of Jordan
- Arabic music
