= Malyoun =

Studio album by JadaL
- Released: July 2016
- Language: Arabic
- Producer: Mahmoud Radaideh

JadaL chronology
El Makina (2012)	Malyoun (2016)	La Tlou' El Daw (2021)

Malyoun (Album) (English: Million) (Arabic: مليون) is the third studio album by Jordanian rock band JadaL. It was released in July 2016. This album contains 12 tracks the Album was launched for first time on 28 July 2016 at Amman Citadel Jabal al-Qal'a, (جبل القلعة). Composed and written by Mahmoud Radaideh.

== Track listing ==
No.	Title	Length
1.	"Itha Ihna Rohna"	2:52
2.	"Kanz"	4:50
3.	"Malyoun"	4:53
4.	"Ashrar"	7:22
5.	"Ana Winta"	4:13
6.	"Ma Fe Gheirak"	3:26
7.	"Mish Maktoobeh"	3:53
8.	"galbi metlel ward"	2:40
9.	"Yumain O Leila"	7:55
10.	"Bnehki Feh Bel Hilem"	3:56
11.	"Mesh Hadool Nasak"	4:18
12.	"Sotko A'ala Min El Samma'at"	6:24
Total length:		54:02
