= Darine =

Swedish singer-songwriter (born 1984)

Darine دارين
- Birth name: Darine Afyouni دارين افيوني
- Born: 20 August 1983 (age 41); Tripoli, Lebanon
- Origin: Lebanon Sweden
- Genres: Pop, R&B, Arabic music
- Occupation: Singer-songwriter
- Years active: 2004–present
- Labels: EMI Music Arabia (2004—2006)

Darine Afyouni (Arabic: دارين افيوني; born 20 August 1983), known by the mononym Darine (Arabic: دارين), is a Lebanese-Swedish singer-songwriter. With two albums in account, her debut single was "Aiwa" on her album Ma Rulez. In 2006, she released her second studio album My Compliments.

== Biography ==
Darine was born in Tripoli, Lebanon in 1983 to a Lebanese father and Romanian mother.

=== Career ===
Darine's debut single, "Aiwa", was released in summer 2004, and it was produced by EMI Music Arabia & PRO Music. After that, she released her debut album Ma Rulez, which included two versions of the song "Aiwa" along with eighteen new tracks. The album included "Ja Leily" (pronounced "Ya Leily"). This was Darine's second single.

The album was re-issued for the European region which had a different cover with more English songs. Darine released a second album in 2006 which was titled My Compliments, which is again under EMI. The album had 17 tracks in both English and Arabic languages. The first single of this album was called "Ma Fi Ella Enta" and the album generally received good reviews. However, Darine was going through management changes and she changed her management label and she did not continue to promote her second album. Since then Darine has been absent from the music industry and she did few tracks independently and she has been aiming to do a comeback. Currently, she is not signed to any label.

Darine released an extended play in summer 2022 with never-heard-before demos along with two new tracks.

==== Albums ====
1. Ma Rulez (2004)
2. My Compliments (2006)
