= El Ard, El Salam =

El Ard... El Salam

Studio album by Mohamed Mounir
- Released: 2002
- Label: Africana

Mohamed Mounir chronology
'Ana Alby Masaken Shabya' (2001)	El Ard... El Salam (2002)	'Ahmar Shafayef' (2003)

Professional ratings
Review scores
Source	Rating
Allmusic	4/5 stars

El Ard... El Salam (Arabic: الأرض..السلام) is a 2002 studio album by Mohamed Mounir. In contrast to Mounir's largely secular catalogue of albums, El Ard... El Salam (The Earth... Peace) features religiously themed lyrics. The album features various Western musicians, including the German oud-player, guitarist and composer Roman Bunka.

Following the September 11th attacks, Mounir feared that Islam was increasingly being associated with terrorism and intolerance in the West and was thus driven to learn more about his religion. This desire lead the artist to perform the hajj in 2001. He returned critical of both fellow Muslims for not seeking the true meaning of the religion, and non-Muslims for judging a religion which felt that they knew very little about. These experiences led him to release El Ard... El Salam, with the hope that this album would present a truer, more peaceful image of Islam.

== Track listing ==
1. "Maddad Ya Rasul Allah" - 6:05
2. "Sali Ya Waheb El Safa" - 4:25
3. "Allahoo Ya Allahoo" - 4:42
4. "Salatun Fi Sirri wa Gahri" - 6:57
5. "Salatu Allah Ya Mawlay " - 4:34
6. "Salatun ala Mustapha " - 3:13
7. "Absheru Ya Shabab" - 4:08
8. "Ashraku El Badr" - 3:48
9. "Maddad" (Germany) - 4:53
