= El Makina =

Album by JadaL

Studio album by JadaL
- Released: December 29, 2012
- Genres: Rock, Alternative Rock, Indie Rock
- Language: Arabic
- Label: CD Baby
- Producer: Mahmoud Radaideh

JadaL chronology
Arabic Rocks (2009)	El Makina (2012)	Malyoun (2016)

El Makina (English: The Machine) (Arabic: الماكينة) is the second studio album by Jordanian rock band JadaL. It was released on December 29, 2012. This album contains 10 tracks talks about social and personal issues matters to youth in the Middle East. Composed and written by Mahmoud Radaideh.

== Track listing ==
No.	Title	Length
1.	"Ghabeh B'eed"	4:59
2.	"Ana Bakhaf Min El Commitment"	4:20
3.	"Fe Nabd Ana Has"	3:52
4.	"El Makina"	4:57
5.	"I'm in Love With Wala Bint"	3:30
6.	"Yum El Jum'a Dayman Ashwab"	3:54
7.	"Zad El Sheib"	4:36
8.	"Bye Bye Azizi"	4:00
9.	"Ma Raddatish"	4:50
10.	"Hada Yakhud Makani"	2:33
Total length:		41:31
