= Shababeek =

1981 studio album by Mohamed Mounir

Studio album by Mohamed Mounir
- Released: 1981
- Length: 42:50
- Language: Egyptian Arabic
- Label: Slam!
- Producer: Yehya Khalil Band

Mohamed Mounir chronology
Benetweled (1978)	Shababeek (1981)	Etkalemy (1983)

Shababeek (Egyptian Arabic: شبابيك, romanized: Shabābīk, lit. 'Windows') is a 1981 studio album by Egyptian singer Mohamed Mounir.

== Track listing ==
Side one
No.	Title	Lyrics	Music	Length
1.	"El Leila Ya Samra" (الليلة يا سمرا Tonight, O Dark-Skinned One; Mohamed Hamam cover)	Fouad Haddad	Ahmed Mounib	5:40
2.	"Shababeek" (شبابيك Windows)	Magdy Naguib	Mounib	4:44
3.	"Shagar El Lamoon" (شجر اللمون Lemon Trees)	Abdel Rahim Mansour	Mounib	4:53
4.	"Crescendo" (كريشندو)	Shawky Hegab	Yehya Khalil	6:30
Total length:				21:47

Side two
No.	Title	Lyrics	Music	Length
1.	"Ashky Lemeen" (أشكي لمين To Whom Can I Complain?; Mohamed El Helw cover)	Baligh Hamdi (Note: Credited under the pseudonym "ابن النيل" (Ibn al-Nīl, 'Son of the Nile').); Mansour	Hamdi	6:35
2.	"Ya Zamany" (يا زماني O My Time)	Naguib	Aziz El Nasser	5:04
3.	"'Al-Madina" (ع المدينة To the City)	Mansour	Mounib	4:49
4.	"El Koun Kolo Beydour" (الكون كله بيدور The Whole Universe is Spinning)	Mansour	Hussein Gasser	4:35
Total length:				21:03 42:50

== Personnel ==
Credits adapted from the album's liner notes.

- Mohamed Mounir – performer
- Yehya Khalil Band – performer, arrangement
  - Aziz El Nasser – acoustic and electric guitar
  - Fathy Salama – keyboards
  - Michael Kokios – electric bass
  - Yehya Khalil – drums, percussion
- Tarek El Kashef – engineering
