= Wagih Aziz =

Egyptian composer and singer

Wagih Aziz (Arabic: وجيه عزيز) (born 1961) is an Egyptian composer and singer who has had his debut back in 1988.

== About Wagih ==
Wagih Aziz made his debut back in 1988 through a theatrical adaptation of Fouad Haddad poems. Over the years, Wagih developed a taste chiefly influenced by two styles, those of Sayyed Darwish and The Rahbanis — an influence that made its way into his own style. Both Wagih's and Darwish's tunes are inspired by and based on their compatriots' concerns and propensity with a spectrum of their strata. While the Rahbanis, above all other Arab experiments, are regarded by Wagih as the model, in terms of the greatest lyrics and melodies.

Wagih's melodies rely on words. As for the poets he may sing or melodize their works, he generally favors those whose vocabulary and themes reflect Egyptian culture. Therefore, his favorite Egyptian poet of all times is Salah Jahin, while Ali Salama – who has been known almost through Wagih's works – is his most frequent choice among the contemporary.

Socially, Wagih was born to an Upper-Egyptian middle-class family, many of its members exercising artistic hobbies, such as drawing, sculpture and photography. Regarding his own interest in music, Wagih says that he did not intended to be a musician, singer, or even a music lover, and most likely is that music itself is selective with the people it "calls"!

== Albums ==
Wagih's first album "Bellil" (At Night) was released in 1997, and was produced by the Ministry of Culture. His next album was "Zaalan Shewaya" (A Bit Down), released in 2004. His third studio album entitled "Na-es Hetta" (Missing A Piece), released in 2008, was perceived by critics as a candid portrayal of Egyptians.

== Collaborations ==
Wagih composed music for many plays and movies, from "Karawan El Fan" (Artistic Curle) in 1988 to his most recent theatrical work "El Fan Sas" (Art Led) in 2005. Throughout his career, he composed songs for many artists since his first collaboration with Mohamed Mounir on Mounir's album "El Tool We El Loon We El Horria" in 1993.

=== Songs for Mohamed Mounir ===
- Asfoor (A Sparrow), From "EL Tool We El Loon We El Horria"
- Sagher Al Sen (Youngster) From "EL Tool We El Loon We El Horria"
- Heeh (Hurray) From "EL Tool We El Loon We El Horria"
- Taalaly (Come To Me) From "EL Tool We El Loon We El Horria"
- Momken (I May) From "Momken"
- Men Awel Lamsa (First Touch) From "Men Awel Lamsa"
- Albek El Shater (Where Are You Love) From "El Farha"
- Hader (At Your Command) From "El Farha"
- Edaya Fi Geuoby (Hands In My Pocket) From "Embareh Kan Umri Eshreen"
- Law Kan Lezama Frome "Taam Elbyout"
- Maaky Frome "Taam Elbyout"

=== Songs for Simon ===
- Mesh Nazra We Ebtesama (More Than A Look Or Smile), Written By: Mohamed Naser | Arranged By: Ahmed El Naser
- Mashya Fe Haly (Minding My Own Business), Written By: Mohamed Naser | Arranged By: Ahmed El Naser
