= Beirut Jam Sessions =

Lebanese concert promoter

Beirut Jam Sessions is a Lebanese concert promoter, booker, music management agency and media company founded in 2012 by Anthony Semaan, Jessica Naime, Talia Souki and Roy Jamhouri in Beirut, Lebanon. The organization plays a central role in developing and defining the Lebanese alternative music scene, namely by organizing filmed jam sessions between the more established international acts they book and the local Lebanese acts who they arrange to open for them at concerts.

== Artists ==
=== Concerts ===
As concert promoters, Beirut Jam Sessions have worked with a wide range of alternative music acts from around the world, including Pony Pony Run Run, The Royal Concept, Thomas Azier, Mike Dawes, We Were Evergreen and Son of Dave.

== Management ==
Beirut Jam Sessions has also managed the Lebanese folk act Postcards.

== Videos ==
One of Beirut Jam Sessions main ways of creating an audience for Lebanese artists is through the production of high-quality music videos on its YouTube channel. The videos are meant to be in "raw conditions, completely unplugged, in a random location in the country".
