= Duman, Islamabad =

Duman
- Town
- Location within Pakistan
- Coordinates: 33.16°N 73.18°E
- Country: Pakistan
- Province: (Islamabad Capital Territory) Islamabad C.T
- Elevation: 447 m (1,467 ft)

Population
  - Total: 117,591
- Time zone: UTC+5 (PST)

Duman is a town in the Islamabad Capital Territory of Pakistan. It is located at 33° 16' 45N 73° 18' 40E with an altitude of 447 metres (1469 feet).
