= Alemony Eneeki =

Studio album by Mohamed Mounir
- Released: 1977
- Label: Sonar
- Producer: Hani Shenouda

Mohamed Mounir chronology
Alemony Eneeki (1977)	Bnetweled (1979)

Alemony Eneeki (Arabic: علموني عنيكي, tr: "Teach me about you") is a 1977 studio album by Mohamed Mounir.

== Track listing ==
- All lyrics by Abdulrahim Mounsour. Music by Ahmed Mouib, except where noted.
1. "Alemony Eneeki" – 02:11 (Hani Shenouda)
2. "Dunia Rayha" – 06:01
3. "Ya Sabia" – 04:15
4. "Amana Ya Bahr" – 03:42 (Shenouda)
5. "Qool Lel Ghareeb" –
6. "Fi Eniky Ghorba" – 04:20
7. "Ya Azab Nafsy" – 03:25 (Shenouda)
8. "Eh Ya Blad Ya Ghareeba" – 03:32 (Shenouda)
9. "Yamaah" – 05:55
10. "El Rezq Ala Allah" – 04:01
