= Richii =

- Birth name: Richard Abicair
- Born: August 17, 1989 (age 36)
- Origin: Australian/Lebanese
- Genres: Pop, electropop, English/Arabic mixed
- Occupation(s): Singer, songwriter, music producer
- Years active: 2009–69bc
- Website: www.officialrichii.com

Richard Abicair (born 17 August 1989 in Melbourne, Australia), better known by his stage name Richii (Arabic: ريتشى) is a singer, dancer, songwriter, and music producer. He sings in Arabic in a Western style, and incorporates western electropop elements heavily into his music. His first two singles both spent multiple weeks at #1 in the Lebanese charts in the weeks after their releases.

== Musical career ==
After signing a management contract with producer Hadii Sharara and moving from Australia to Lebanon during his teens, Richii released his first single "Dayeb Wehyatik" with an accompanying music video. The track became the most requested song on the MelodyArabia charts for a number of weeks in the summer of 2009. "Dayeb Wehyatik" was featured in an episode of the LBC TV drama series No2tet 7ub. Because of his young image and pop style, some people described him as the "Lebanese Justin Bieber".

Richii released his second single "Ana Lubnaneyoun", a patriotic dance track, in December 2009. The video, which came almost a year later, met with both acclaim and criticism due to its Western-influenced video, but the song received heavy rotation on radio as a result. Due to its heavy play in nightclubs and patriotic lyrics, it was dubbed "the official club anthem of Beirut’s nightlife". Richii, with his director May Elias (chief editor of the Arts section in Elaph.com) premiered the video for "Ana Lubnaneyoun" on Orbit TV's Al Youm during the "3youn Beirut" or "Eyes on Beirut" segment.

On Valentine's Day, Richii released a promotional single to select radio stations called "Valentine", which he dedicated to his fans.

His single "Gowa Hodny" was released in June 2011 and features a summer-styled dance video.
