= Darga (band) =

Moroccan musical group

Darga is a musical group based in Casablanca, Morocco founded in 2001 by students of an Art school. They play Gnawa music and fusions of traditional music with Western styles.

== Official site ==
- Official website
