= Meen (band) =

- Origin: Beirut, Lebanon
- Genres: Rock, Lebanese
- Years active: 2006–present
- Label: Banadoura
- Members: Ralf Choueiri; Makram Aboulhusn; Bernard Najm; Joseph Hammam; Toni Yammine; Fouad Yammine
- Past members: Dory Francis; Tareck Annish; Mike Ghanimeh
- Website: www.meentheband.com

MEEN (Arabic: مين) is a Lebanese rock band founded by Fouad and Toni Yammine in 2006. The band is best known for its humorous and sarcastic style, and most notably for performing in native Lebanese, not traditional Arabic.

== Projects and involvements ==
In 2006, Meen had its very first concert at the Saint Joseph University in Beirut, where, for the first time, the band performed for a small crowd of 300 people. Soon, the band was touring in other Lebanese Universities. Late 2006, Meen's single Banadoura was published in the Banadoura compilation, a Lebanese compilation featuring Lebanese underground music for the latest 20 years.

In 2007, Meen wrote and released “Yalla Nerkoud”, the official song of that year's Beirut Marathon and performed the song on the finish line the day of the event.

In 2008, the An-Nahar national newspaper contacted Meen and asked them to compose songs for the yearly memorial event of Gebran Tueni. Meen wrote five songs for the event, and all were released as an album entitled “Adar el A7rar” (Destiny of the Free). Meen performed the songs live in an event that was broadcast live on all Lebanese TV stations.

In 2009, the band released the album “Teer w 3aleh ya Balon” with 5 original songs composed and recorded for the children's play of the same name. In May 2009, the band performed in a big concert at the heart of the city at "theatre tournesol". This event was recorded and later released as a live album, on December 8, comprising thirteen original songs in pure Meen style. On the same date, Meen also released an 8 tracks studio Christmas album entitled "Min L Manjam 3al marrekh.

In 2010, Meen was touring all around the country and performing in private and public events and festivals.

In August 2011, Meen launched their album, 3arouset Bkeseen.

In September 2016, Meen launched their latest album "Rishineh Bel Kalash". This album by the Lebanese rock band MEEN features 13 songs.

== Lyrics and songs topics ==
The band is best known for its humorous and sarcastic style, and most notably for performing in native Lebanese, adding a twist and a bit of flare to traditional rock music. As stated in numerous interviews, Meen fervently promotes the Lebanese dialect versus the culturally adopted traditional Arabic. The band members consider it only normal to sing in the spoken language of everyday conversations, even including the occasional English or French words that naturally occur in them. Their lyrics reflect this unique and rare approach.

Meen’s song topics are varied and are usually quite mordant and sometimes critical of the political climate in Lebanon. In their single, “Kamlo l 7arb” (“Continue the War”), released in 2006, Meen mockingly sings on in a beautiful ballad “let the war carry on, and let the children die”.

Another fan favorite, “Nasheed el Banadoura” (“Anthem of the Tomato”), invites people to use tomatoes as weapons for an artistic revolution.

== Music and style ==
Banadoura (Live), song by Meen

Meen's music style is purely western. Even though oriental instruments are occasionally used, like the buzuk, the riq, the oud, and others, the music is mainly considered rock/blues, with a traditional rock composition of two guitars, one bass guitar, drums, and a synth.

== Creative Commons ==
Meen is the first Lebanese band to release its music under the Creative Commons license since 2006. The band has licensed its material as Attribution Non-Commercial No Derivatives (by-nc-nd).

== Discography ==
- "Qamlo L 7arb" (single, 2006)
- Meen Live (2009)
- 3arouset Bkeseen (2011)
- Rishineh Bel Kalash (2016)

== References and press interviews ==
Other interviews and reviews

- MEEN TV Interviews Compilation (Television production). Lebanon: Compilation from many lebanese stations. 2009.
- Reportage about Meen on Future TV (Television production). Lebanon: Future News. 2010.
- Reportage about Meen Live Album (Television production). Lebanon: Future News. 2009.
- "فرقة "مين": روك ساخر باللهجة اللبنانيّة", Al-Akhbar Newspaper, Lebanon, 30 May 2009
- "Review about Festival Deir El Amar", Almustaqbal Newspaper, Lebanon, 10 August 2010
- ""Fete de la musique" 2010 Review", Almustaqbal Newspaper, Lebanon, 24 June 2010
- "Interview About May 2009 Concert", Daleel Annahar Newspaper, Lebanon, 22 May 2009
- "Interview", Time Out Beirut, Lebanon, Oct 2008
- "Radio Interview" on Voix Du Liban Radio, Lebanon

- "بالصور- فرقة الروك اللبنانية "مين" تطلق البومها الجديد وسط جمهورها", Bisara7a, Lebanon, 23 September 2016
- "فريق (مين) يطلق ألبومه الجديد – بالصور", Al Jaras, Lebanon, 23 September 2016
- "فؤاد يمين وفرقته… "رشّيني بل كلش"", Hasriyan, Lebanon, 23 September 2016, archived from the original on 12 October 2016
- "فرقة الروك اللبنانية "مين" تطلق البومها الجديد وسط جمهورها", Lebanon Debate, Lebanon, 23 September 2016
- ""رشّيني بل كلش"... فرقة الروك اللبنانية "مين" تُطلق ألبومها", Annahar, Lebanon, 23 September 2016
