= Osman Kürşat Duman =

Turkish footballer

Personal information
- Date of birth: 13 March 1987 (age 39)
- Place of birth: Istanbul, Turkey
- Height: 1.75 m (5 ft 9 in)
- Position: Defender

Team information
- Current team: Yalovaspor

Youth career
- 2002–06: Fenerbahçe PAF

Senior career*
Years	Team	Apps	(Gls)
2002–06	Fenerbahçe PAF	54	(3)
2006–09	Fenerbahçe	2	(0)
2006–09	Yalovaspor	?	(?)
- * Club domestic league appearances and goals

Osman Kürşat Duman (born 13 March 1987) is a Turkish professional footballer. He currently plays for Yalovaspor.

== Career ==
Fenerbahçe transferred Duman when he was fifteen years old. He made his debut for the club on 11 November 2006 in a Turkish Cup match against Sivasspor. He was brought on in the 88th minute.

Duman played 54 times for Fenerbahçe PAF and 2 times for Turkey U17.

== Honours ==
- Süper Lig (1): 2006–07
