= Mahmoud Radaideh =

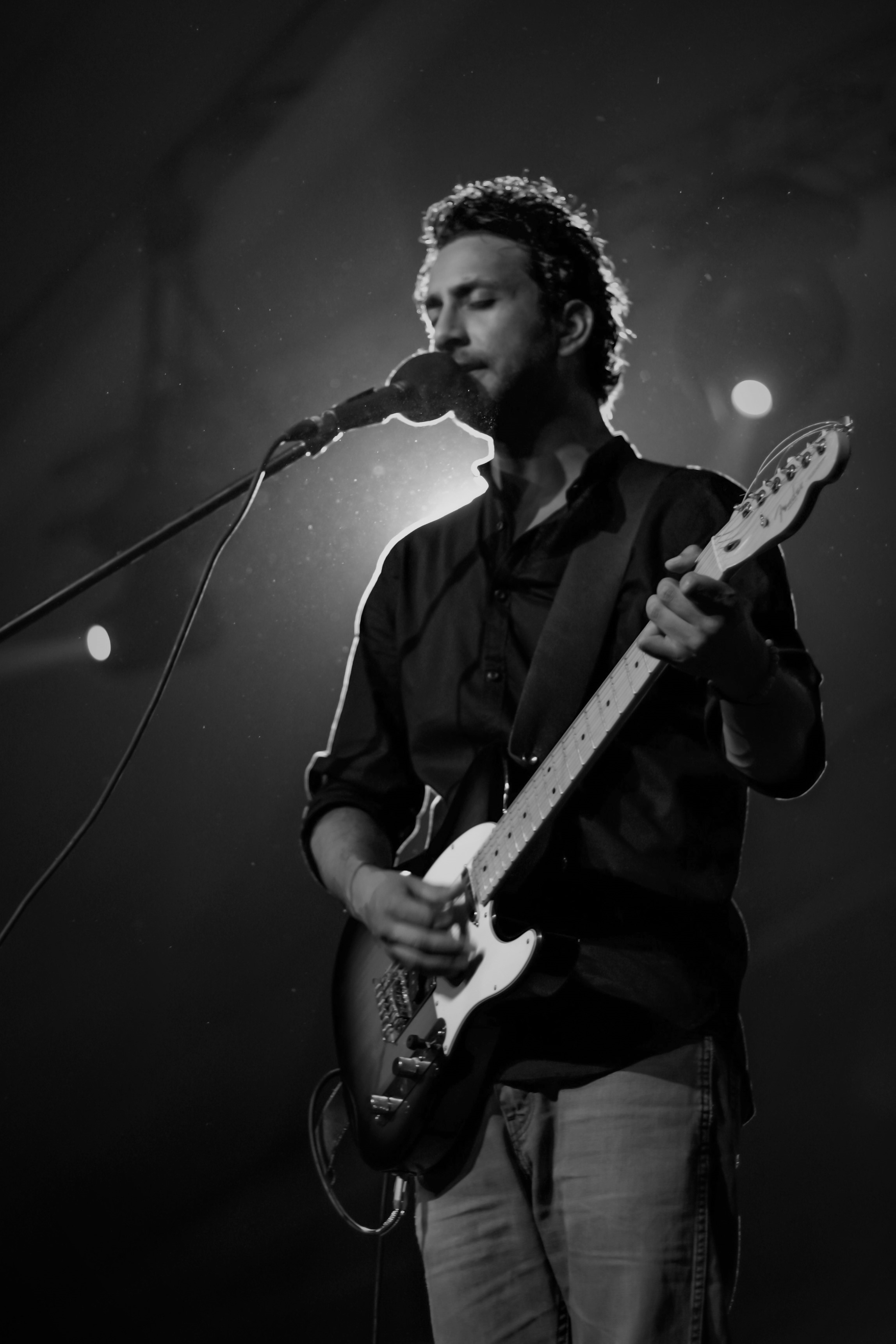
- Radaideh in 2014

Background information
- Born: Amman, Jordan
- Genres: Arabic rock, pop rock, alternative rock, funk rock, pop
- Occupations: Musician, singer-songwriter, guitarist, music producer, entrepreneur
- Instruments: Guitars, vocals, keyboard, bass, rhythm
- Years active: 1998–present
- Website: jadalband.com

Mahmoud Radaideh (Arabic: محمود ردايدة) is a Jordanian songwriter, guitarist, music producer and vocalist, Born in Amman best known as the founder of the pioneer Arabic rock band JadaL.

== Early life ==
Born and raised in the city Amman capital of Jordan, at an early age of 10, started playing guitar after his older brother, he then formed his first band at the age of 14, the formation included musicians such as Muhammad Abdalla (El Morabba3), Tareq Abu Kwaik (el Far3i) and other musicians.

Studied IT at the Jordanian University and graduated in 2005.

== JadaL ==
In 2003 Mahmoud Radaideh formed JadaL which was then one of the pioneer Arabic rock bands in the Arab region. In leading JadaL, Radaideh played many roles, including songwriter, guitarist, producer and later also as a vocalist (2012–present).

he started songwriting by composing the majority of JadaL's first album, Arabic Rocks, such as "Salma", which he composed for his yet to be born niece, asking his sister to name her Salma. It was first released as a single in 2007; the song helped JadaL reach national and regional recognition after JadaL's first release which was a rock rearrangement of "Kol Ma gol El tobah", for Abdel Halim Hafez which was released in 2004. Later on, "Salma" and many other compositions by Radaideh formed the majority of JadaL's first album "Arabic Rocks" released in 2009.

In 2012, Radaideh collaborated with musicians to record and release his compositions in a second album, El Makina that was released 29 December 2012 and contained hit songs, such as "Ana bakhaf min el commitment" and "El Makina", both of which helped JadaL gain even larger recognition and expand their fan base.

In 2016 Mahmoud Radaideh wrote and produced JadaL's Album Malyoun and performed in it as the sole Vocalist for the first time in his career, as well as all Guitars and some keyboards.

== Side projects ==
Radaideh co-founded KazaMada, an Arabic electro/pop/rock/folk project in 2011, where he toured and recorded with them for a year along with artists Tamer abu Ghazaleh, Zeid Hamdan, and Donia Massoud.

In late 2014, Radaideh collaborated with musician, friend, and songwriter Ahmad Farah to form their folktronica side project, Badal FaQed. This project is built on Ahmad Farah's songs written for his solo act but produced electronically by Radaideh. Badal Faqed has released only two singles as of 2015.
