= The Kordz =

Lebanese rock band

The Kordz are a rock group from Lebanon. The band have released one EP, 2003's Last Call, and one album, 2011's Beauty & The East.

The band's lead singer is Moe Hamzeh, a former geology student from American University of Beirut. According to historian and musician Mark LeVine, writing in 2008, Kordz was, "One of the biggest rock bands in Lebanon and the Middle East," at the time. Hamzeh's goal was to rebel against the oppressive Lebanese political system from a spiritual point of view.
