= Mohamed Mounir =

Egyptian singer and actor, born 1954

Mohamed Mounir محمد منير
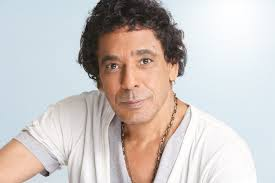
- Official poster of Mohamed Mounir, known as The King.

Background information
- Also known as: The King
- Born: Mohamed Mounir; October 10, 1954 (age 71); Aswan, Egypt
- Origin: Egypt
- Genres: Egyptian pop music; Nubian classics; blues; jazz; reggae
- Occupations: Singer, actor
- Instruments: Vocals, bendir
- Years active: 1977–present
- Labels: Sonar; Sound of America; Digitec; FreeMusic; Mirage; Africana; Alam El-Phan
- Website: mohamedmounir.com

Mohamed Mounir (Arabic: محمد منير; born October 10, 1954) is an Egyptian singer and actor, with a musical career spanning more than four decades. He incorporates various genres into his music, including classical Egyptian music, Nubian music, Blues, Jazz and Reggae. His lyrics are noted both for their philosophical content and for their passionate social and political commentary. He is affectionately known by his fans as "El King" in reference to his album and play "El Malek Howwa El Malek" (The King is The King). Mounir's family is from Nubia, Southern Aswan, Egypt.

In April 2021, he appeared in the opening musical sequence as a singer for the Pharaohs' Golden Parade on an Egyptian funerary boat on the lake in front of the National Museum of Egyptian Civilization.

== Early life ==
Born into a Nubian family in Aswan, Mounir spent most of his early childhood in the village of Manshyat Al Nubia, where he shared his father's interests in both music and politics. As a teenager, he and his family were forced to relocate to Cairo when his village was lost in the floods that followed the construction of the Aswan Dam. It was here that he studied photography at the Faculty of Applied Arts at Helwan University. During this period, he would often sing for friends and family at social gatherings. His singing voice was noticed by the lyricist Abdel-Rehim Mansour, who would go on to introduce Mounir to the renowned folk singer Ahmed Mounib.

== Musical career ==
Following his college graduation, he was called up for military service in 1974, during which he continued his professional musical career by performing in various concerts. He performed his first such concert in 1975. Although the public were initially critical of Mounir for performing in casual attire at a time where many Egyptian singers were expected to wear suits, they eventually warmed to his laidback image.

After completing his military service, Mounir released his 1977 debut solo album Alemony Eneeki on the Sonar record label. Mounir went on to release five more consecutive official albums and featured on one soundtrack album under the Sonar label. To date, Mounir has released a total 22 official albums and featured on six soundtrack albums under a number of different record labels.

Mounir's single "Maddad" from this album caused controversy, as its lyrics could be interpreted as a call for intercession from Muhammad. Among Muslims there are differing views as to whether Muhammad can provide intercession between God's and his believers. This resulted in the music video being banned from Egyptian television for a time. Mounir responded by saying "It is this fight against rigid thought that makes something out of you".

On his 2003 follow-up album "Ahmar Shafayef" (Red Lipstick), he returned to his more familiar style of mainly secular lyrics. In the summer of 2003, following the release of this album, Mounir toured Austria, Germany and Switzerland alongside the Austrian pop musician Hubert von Goisern, and later that year the two musicians performed at a concert in Asyut.

In May 2004 he held a large concert at the pyramids of Giza, during which he was physically attacked by a drunken fan. Despite sustaining minor injuries, he continued his performance until the end of the concert.

He continued recording albums infused with social commentary with the release of his 2005 album Embareh Kan Omry Eshren (Yesterday I Was Twenty) and his album Ta'm El Beyout (Taste of Homes), released in 2008. Ta'm El Beyout was noted for its creativity, but initially did not perform as well as expected in terms of album sales. In 2012, Mounir released his album Ya Ahl El Arab we Tarab.

In 2008 Mounir postponed his New Year's Eve concert at Cairo Opera House in solidarity with the Palestinians suffering the effects of the Gaza War. He issued the statement: "Delaying the concert is a message sent to the whole world, so that it would move forward and help the people in Gaza."

He headlined the Liverpool Arabic Arts Festival 2010 on July 9, at the Liverpool Philharmonic Hall. He is the predecessor to recent musical groups like Black Theama

In February 2021 Mounir announced that he would be playing at concerts in Jerusalem, Haifa, Ramallah and Gaza City, to be the first Egyptian musician to perform in Israel, as he mentioned: "I will be a peace delegate, like Sadat". However, he later declared that he would only tour the Palestinian cities of Ramallah and Gaza.

== Acting career ==
As well as his career as a popular singer, Mounir also has an active acting career. He has appeared in 12 movies, 4 television series and 3 plays. His movie career began in 1982, when he acted in Youssef Chahine's film 'Hadouta Masreia (An Egyptian Story), also being featured on the soundtrack album. In 1997 he played the role of the bard in another movie by Youssef Chahine, the French-Egyptian historical drama Al Maseer (Destiny), which was screened out of competition at the 1997 Cannes Film Festival.

Mounir played the part of the blind poetry professor "Bashir" in the controversial 2005 film Dunia, which centers around the title character Dunia, a belly dancer and poet played by Egyptian actress Hanan Tork. When the film was shown at the 2005 Cairo International Film Festival, it left the audience split between those supporting the film's calls for women's rights and its message against female genital mutilation, and those disapproving of either the title character's desire to express herself through dance, or of the scenes shot in Cairo's slums, judged as tarnishing Egypt's international image.

== Discography ==
=== Official albums ===
- Alemony Eneeki (Your Eyes Taught Me) – 1977
- Bnetweled (We Are Being Born) – 1978
- Shababeek (Windows) ^{YKB} – 1981
- Etkalemy (Speak) ^{YKB} – 1983
- Bareea(innocent) ^{YKB} – 1986
- West El Dayra (In The Middle of The Circle) ^{YKB} – 1987
- Shokolata (Chocolate) – 1989
- Ya Eskenderia (O Alexandria) – 1990
- Meshwar (Trip) – 1991
- El Tool We El Loon We El Horya (The Length, Colour, and Freedom) – 1992
- Eftah Albak (Open Your Heart) – 1994
- Momken (Maybe) – 1995
- Men Awel Lamsa (From The First Touch) – 1996
- El Farha (The Joy) – 1999
- Fi Eshg El Banat (The Love of Girls) – 2000
- Ana Alby Masaken Shabya (My Heart is Public housing) – 2001
- El Ard... El Salam (The Earth... Peace) – 2002
- Ahmar Shafayef (Lipsticks) – 2003
- Hawadeet (Stories) – 2004
- Embareh Kan Omry Eshren (Yesterday I Was Twenty) – 2005
- Ta'm El Beyout (Taste of Homes) – 2008
- Ahl El Arab Wel Tarab (People Of Arabs and Music) – 2012
- El-Rooh Lel-Rooh Dayman Bet'hen (Souls Always Long for Each other) – 2017
- Watan (Homeland) – 2018
- Bab El Jamal (Door of Beauty) – 2021 AA

YKB: Featuring Yahia Khalil's band

== Filmography ==
=== Movies ===
Year	Film	Role	Notes
1982	Hadouta Masreia (An Egyptian Story)	Mahdi	
1986	Al Yawm Al Sades (The Sixth Day)	The Boatman	
1987	Al Tokk Wa Eswera (Ring and Bracelet)	Mr. Mohamed	
1988	Youm Mor We Youm Helw (A Bad Day & A Good Day)	Oraby	
1990	Shabab Ala Kaf Afreet (Youth on the palm of a ghost)		
1991	Ishtebah (Suspicion)	Medhat	
1991	Leih Ya Haram (Why Pyramid)	Ahmed Shafek	
1992	Hekayat Al Ghareb (Stranger Tale)	Saed	
1994	Al Bahth An Tut Ankh Amun (Search for Tutankhamen)	Gad	
1997	Al Maseer (Destiny)	Marwan (The Bard)	
2005	Kiss Me Not on the Eyes	Dr. Bashir	
2006	Mafesh Gher Keda (Nothing but this)	Himself	

=== Television ===
- Bakkar
- Ali Elewa
- Gomhoreyat Zefta (Republic of Zefta)
- Al Moghani (The Singer)

=== Theatre ===
- El Malek; El Malek
- Al Shahateen
- Masa' Al Kheer Ya Masr

== Awards ==
- Peace Award from CNN for his album Earth Peace
- Diamond Award from "Bama Awards"
- Best Singer award in the July 2008 MEMA competition.
- He was honored by the management of the Alexandria Film Festival at the opening of its 30th session
- Platinum Award for the best Egyptian and Arab singer for the song Yasmina, in which the international singer Adel Al-Taweel participated with the Ich und Ich team, the most famous international band at present, and he deserved the Universal International Award, after he distributed the disc that includes the song Taht Al-Yasmina 700,000 copies, achieving the highest distribution rate in Germany. Mounir also won, in the same year and for the same song, in Arabic and English, third place in the public referendum organized by the Proseven channel for the competition for the best song in Germany.
- The song El-leila Ya Samra won a BBC poll of the 50 best African songs of the 20th century.
- Honorable Award in 2005 for the movie Kiss Me Not on the Eyes.
