= Music of Jordan =

The traditional music of Jordan has a long history. Rural zajal songs, with improvised poetry played with a mijwiz, tablah, arghul, oud, rabab, and reed pipe ensemble accompanying is popular. The transition of old cultural music into hit pop songs is known worldwide. Recently, Jordan has seen the rise of many prominent DJs and pop stars.

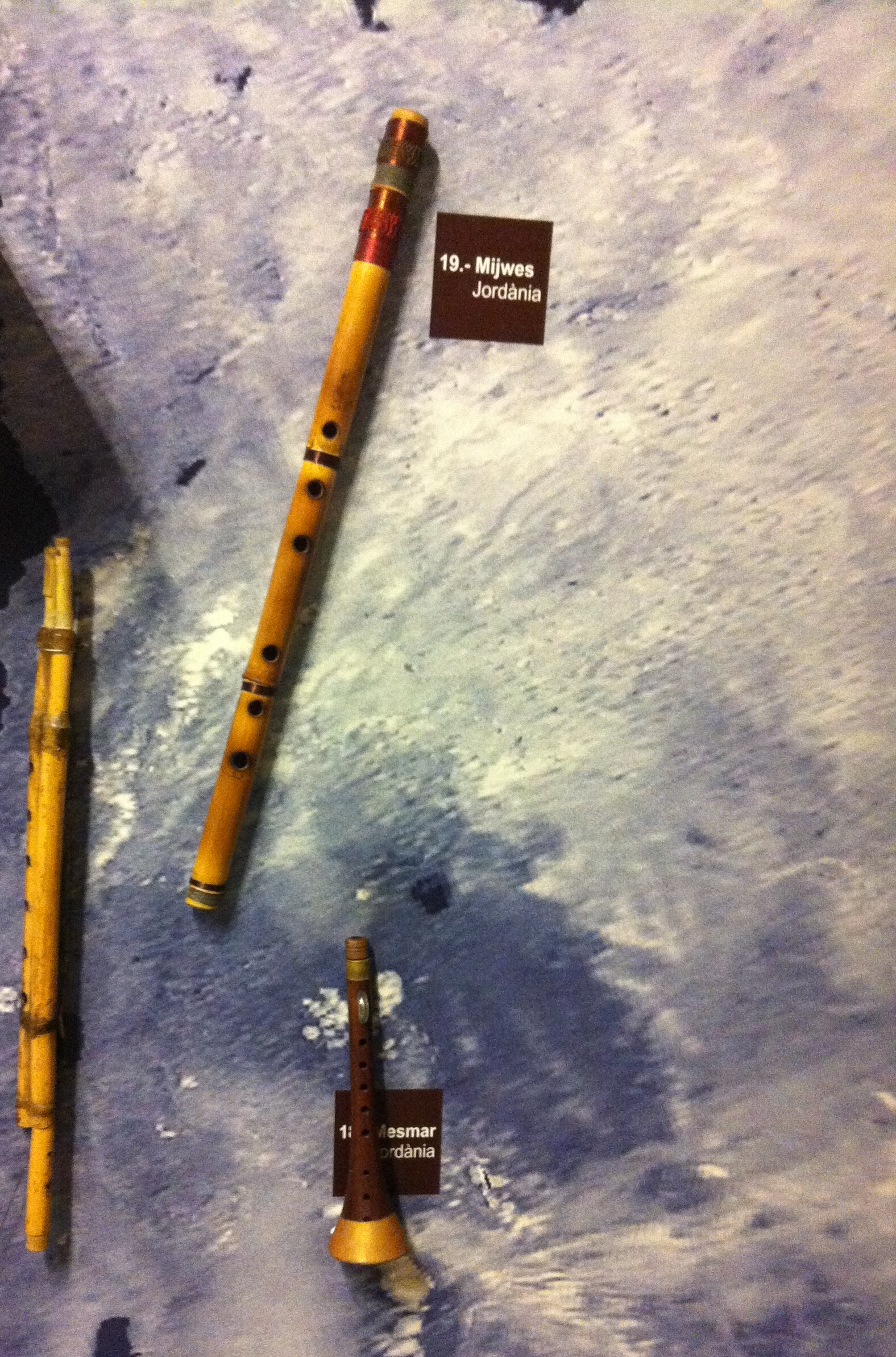
Shababa, mijwiz and yarghul

== Traditional Jordanian musical instruments ==
Jordanian music has a diversity and a range of components that make it a popular art. Over the centuries music has evolved and so did its instruments. Jordanian music comes with a variety of instruments.

- Flute/reed pipe known as Shababa
- Mizmar
- Mijwiz
- Arghul known as Yarghul
- Oud
- Tablah
- Rebab
- Bagpipes known as Gerbeh
- Riq
- Daf
- Simsimiyya, found in the port city of Aqaba and the southern desert

== Popular music ==
Generally, there are two types of Jordanian music, each with unique platforms and various tracks: cheerful/fun/happy cultural songs and strong-meaning patriotic songs. Over the years, new varieties of singers and composers have emerged.

Jordan's music formed from the strong Bedouin and sub-Arabian area. It has a diverse variety of elements which creates a unique platform. Jordanian bands and artists are blending Arab-Western electronic pop to the world stage. Over the past decades Diana Karazon and others were the most popular among the mass audience, in mid-2000s Indie bands such as JadaL and others emerged and found a moderate amount of success amongst the youth in Jordan and the region. The Bedouin singer Omar Al-Abdallat (known for his patriotic song "Hashemi, Hashemi"), Toni Qattan, and singer Hani Mitwasi (the winner of the Jordan Awards 2010) are perhaps Jordan's biggest stars.

In Amman, the capital of Jordan, there has been a movement of alternative music in the last decades. Rock bands that mix Western and Eastern influences are becoming more popular. Notable local music groups in this spectrum include Hayajan. The local and regional scene also flourished with bands such as JadaL (2003), Autostrad (band) (2007), Akher Zapheer (2007), El Morabba3 (2008), Aziz Maraka, and others.

Jordan also has an underground heavy metal scene with bands such as Bilocate.

Arabic hip hop and Arabic rap artists in Jordan have added to the music scene. Notable artists include El Far3i and Torabyeh.

Electronic dance music and pop music producers from Jordan have thrived in the last decade. Notable artists include Ayah Marar, known for her global hit "Thinking About You" with Calvin Harris. The Jordanian-Egyptian duo Bedouin has also broken onto the world scene, having collaborated with artists like Virgil Abloh and Black Coffee. In 2022 they recorded a hybrid live set for Cercle in Petra. Other recent electronic and pop acts include Dana Salah and Zeyne. The artist Zaid Khaled, active since the early 2020s, is known for sentimental melodies, auto-tuned vocals, and lyrics drawn from his personal experiences.

Although some music in the region does not adhere to a specific cultural tradition, artists such as Llunr (pop) and Pinwheel Valley (indie rock) have produced works that promote messages of peace.

Classical music performers and composers of Jordanian origin include Zade Dirani and Salam Murtada.

== See also ==
- Arabic music
- Arabic pop music
- Tawfiq Al-Nimri
