= Haifa Kamal =

Jordanian singer

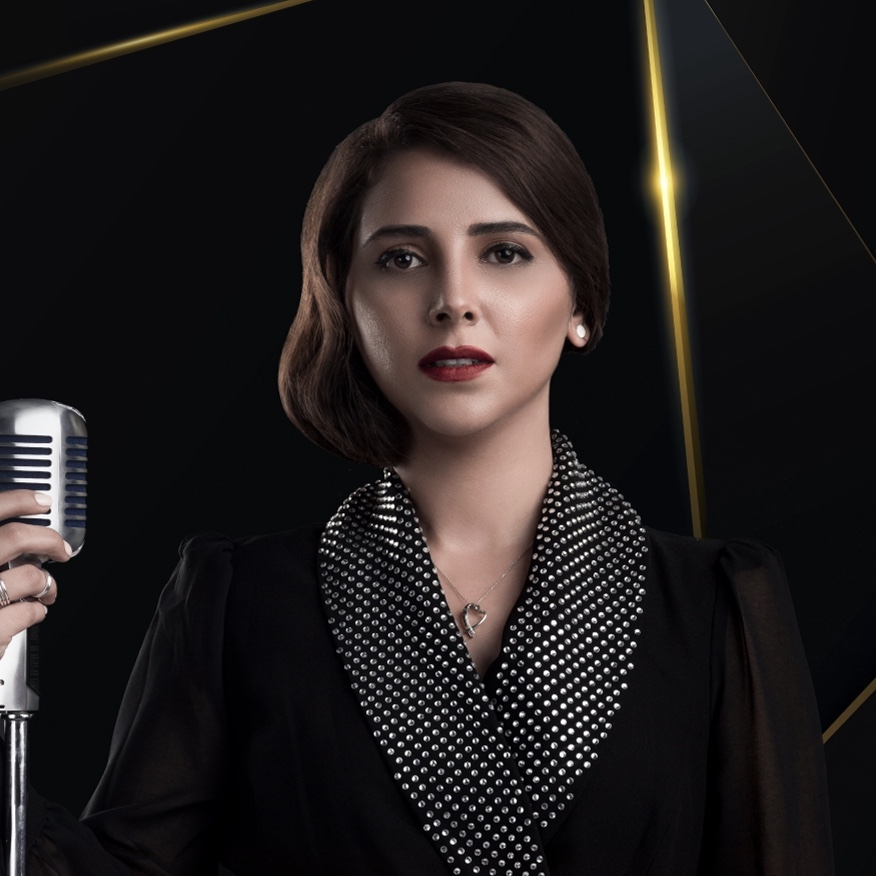

Background information
- Born: December 1983 (age 42); Jordan
- Origin: Palestinian
- Genres: Arabic music, pop, EDM, alternative music
- Occupations: Singer, record producer
- Years active: 2003–present

Haifa Kamal (Arabic: هيفاء كمال) (born December 1983) is a Jordanian singer and record producer of Palestinian descent.

== Early life and career ==
Kamal started at the age of six to learn Arabic singing, under the supervision of her father, Palestinian musician and composer Kamal Khalil, as the youngest member of his musical band (Baladna). After graduating from high school, she studied mathematics at Zarqa University, and graduated with BA degree in mathematics. To pursue her professional musical career, she enrolled herself in the Bachelor of Arabic music program at the National Music Conservatory - Jordan and graduated in 2011 with a sub-branch of Arabic Singing.

After earning a bachelor's degree in Arabic music and singing, Kamal, continued to participate in concerts with her father's musical group (Baladna), in addition to the regular Arabic music concerts in the National music conservatory, alongside Amman Symphony Orchestra.

Kamal has performed as a solo vocalist with many professional musical groups and orchestras locally in Jordan and internationally, including Baladna (Kamal Khalil), Rum (Tareq Al Nasser), Razz (Aziz Maraka), National music conservatory orchestra, Amman Symphonita, Amman Arabic string Quartet.

=== Solo music career ===
In 2014, Kamal produced her first album Denya with 10 tracks from different music genres in collaboration with Lebanese producer and composer (Mike Massy), Saudi Arabian-Iranian Musician (Alaa Wardi) and Jordanian Composer (Aziz Maraka).

A second mini Album (EP) named (#THEEDMProject) was released by Kamal late in 2018, in which She reproduced traditional Arab music (especially Levantine) in EDM (electronic dance music) style, and the album was very well received by critics, as she tried to revive traditional and folk music, making it more popular among youth audience, with a modern musical arrangement.

In 2019, Kamal produced the first Arabic anime music video, directed and animated by Arab animators Hilal Ashour and Kamal Khdeim-Allah, featuring her opening song of (Denya).

During the COVID-19 pandemic in 2020 and 2021, Kamal collaborated with the Spanish flamenco band Obaider to produce a three-track mini-album (A Córdoba), performing three Arabic poems accompanied by Flamenco compositions and musical arrangements. Due to the global lockdown and curfew conditions during the pandemic, it took the production team nearly 18 months to execute and release the project.

Early in 2022, Kamal and Obaider band were awarded two golden medals at the (Global Music Awards) for best female vocalist, and best world music production 2021 for their latest mini album (A Córdoba) .

== Discography ==
=== Albums ===
- Denya – 2014
- #TheEDMProject – 2018
- A Córdoba - 2021 (with Obaider)

=== Singles ===
- "Ya Rait Ashoofak"
- "Malak"
- "Zaman"
- "Ya Zareef Al Tool"
- "Rah Aghanni"
- "Wesh Rajjaak"
- "Shu Kteer" (ft. Yazan Al Rousan)
- "Ta’al" (ft. Alaa Wardi)
- "Hebbi Daani"
- “Al Rozana”
- “Ghanna El Hadi”

Music videos

- Ta’al (ft. Alaa Wardi)
- Fairuz Medley (Alaa Wardi ft. Haifa Kamal)
- Denya (anime)
- Bayyaeen El Enab
- Ala Meen ( Alaa Wardi ft. Haifa Kamal)
