= Tawfiq Al-Nimri =

Tawfiq ll-Nimri
- Born: 10 June 1918; Al Husn
- Origin: Jordan
- Died: 23 October 2011 (aged 93) Amman
- Genres: Jordanian folklore, Arabic music
- Occupations: Vocalist, composer, lyricist
- Instrument: Oud (Arabic:عود)

Tawfiq Nimri (Arabic: توفيق نمري; June 10, 1918 – October 23, 2011) was a Jordanian singer and composer.

He was the first Jordanian to collect, write, sing, and compose Jordanian folkloric music. He presented and appeared in more than 750 works, many of which were covered by other Arab singers such as Wadih El Safi, Nasri Shamseddine and Omar Al-Abdallat. Tawfiq's last performance was with the Lebanese singer Wadih El Safi.

== Early life and education ==
Nimri was born in the town of Al Husn, Jordan, in 1918, he spent his childhood with his grandfather Rizqalla Al-Nimri after the death of his father. Tawfiq's childhood name was Fad'ous (Arabic: فـدعوس); the name was given by one of sheikhs whose name was the same, he was later renamed Tawfiq by the principal of his school. He is best known for Folkloric songs. He studied at the Catholic School for two years, during which was the supervisor of the chorale of the church. He learned the Greek language to perform hymns in Greek Byzantine style.

== Career ==
This se the British Army during World War II, and was assigned to Haifa-Baghdad Road as a payroll officer. As entertainment, Nimri often played his oud and sang with the British soldiers – he even learned to play and sing the German love song Lili Marlene.

Nimri left after seven years in service and relocated in 1949 to Ramallah where he worked at a local radio station and composed many songs, one of which was performed during the visit of Abdullah I of Jordan. Ten years later, he moved to Amman where he joined Jordan Radio and performed/composed many songs.
