= Michael Massey (disambiguation) =

Michael or Mike Massey may refer to:

- Mike Massey (born 1947), American professional pool player
- Mike Massey (baseball) (born William Herbert Massey; 1893–1971), American baseball second baseman
- Michael Massey (born 1998), American baseball second baseman

== See also ==
- Michael Massee (1952–2016), American actor
- Michael Masi (born 1978), Australian motorsports official
- Mike Massie (born 1954), American politician
- Mike Massy (born 1982), Lebanese-born singer, songwriter, and celebrity vocal coach
