= 47Soul =

Palestinian-Jordanian music band

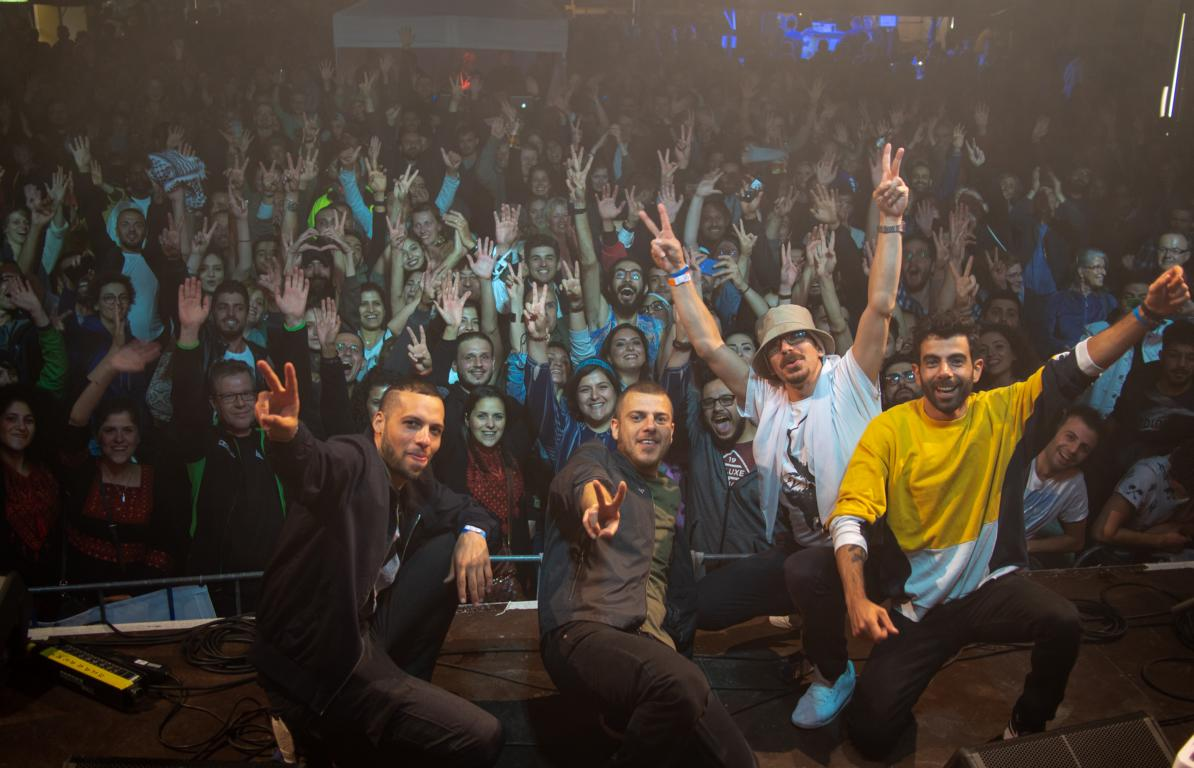
- The group performing in Germany in 2018

Background information
- Origin: Jordan / Palestine
- Genres: Mijwiz, Electronic, Shamstep
- Years active: 2013–present
- Members: Tareq Abu Kwaik (vocals, darbuka); Ramzy Suleiman (vocals, synthesiser, keyboard); Walaa Sbeit (vocals, bass drum)
- Past members: Hamza Arnaout (guitar, electronics, Producer)
- Website: 47soul.com

47Soul is a Palestinian Jordanian electronic music group who are one of the main forces behind the Shamstep electronic dance music movement in the Middle East. The band's first album, Shamstep, was released in 2015.

== Background ==
The group formed in Jordan in 2013. Their debut album Shamstep was released in 2015. In 2017, 47Soul released their second album Balfron Promise, which takes its name from the east London tower block Balfron Tower, where the record was created. It also refers to the Balfour Declaration of 1917 through which the British government committed itself to the creation of a Jewish homeland in Palestine. The group had been residents of Balfron Tower for two years while creating their album. The album received 4 out of 5 stars in a January 2018 review in The Guardian.

The band played at festivals in 2018 like Walthamstow Garden Party, Fusion festival and Festival Med. and NYU Abu Dhabi's Barzakh festival.

On 26 August 2019, NPR released a YouTube video of 47Soul appearing on their "Tiny Desk Concerts" series.

In January 2020, electric guitar player and band member Hamza Arnaout announced his departure from 47Soul citing the need to focus on creating music without the pressure to constantly perform live.

== Band members ==
- Tareq Abu Kwaik – vocals, darbuka, electronics – known independently as El Far3i
- Ramzy Suleiman – vocals, synthesiser, keyboard – known independently as Z the People
- Walaa Sbait – vocals, bass drum

Past member(s):

- Hamza Arnaout – electric guitar – known independently as El Jehaz

== Musical style ==
47Soul's style, Shamstep, is based on mijwiz (a Levantine folk musical style) and electronic dance. "Shamstep" is a portmanteau: 'Sham' refers to the Levant region, which is locally referred to as "Bilad al-Sham", and 'step' refers to the musical style dubstep. The band's music is also associated with the traditional dance called Dabke.
