= Torabyeh =

Torabyeh تُرابية
- Origin: Amman, Jordan
- Genres: rap, Hip hop
- Years active: 2009–present

Torabyeh (Arabic: تُرابية) is a Jordanian rap band from Amman, Jordan, formed in 2009. They gained worldwide attention after Benjamin Netanyahu chose one of their songs in his Likud Party advertisement, which had infuriated the band as they have considered this as what they called 'a move that threatened them by linking them with terrorist organizations'. They threatened taking legal actions, a week later youtube removed the video due to the copyright infringement.

== See also ==
- Music of Jordan
- Arabic music
