= Autostrad =

Jordanian indie rock group

Autostrad أوتوستراد
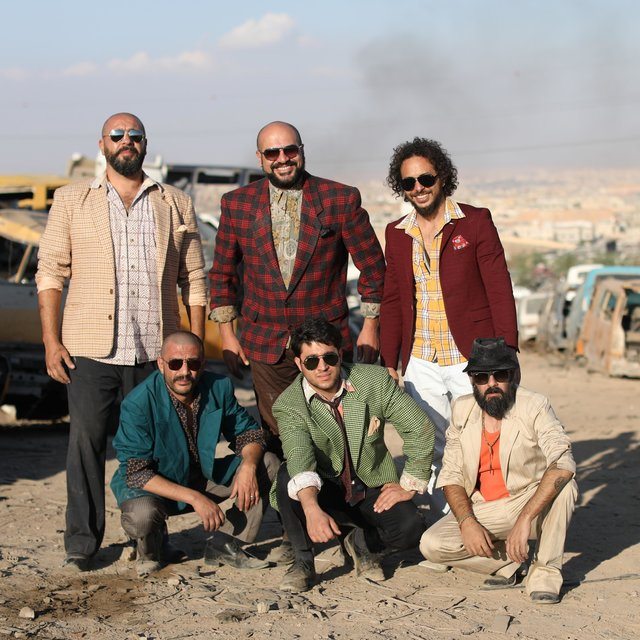
- Autostrad in 2019

Background information
- Origin: Amman, Jordan
- Genres: Alternative rock, Reggae, Funk, Indie
- Years active: 2007–present
- Members: Avo Demerjian; Yazan Sarayrah; Bashar Hamdan; Yazan Al Rousan; Burhan Al Ali; Mohannad Shwayat
- Past members: Hamzeh Arnaout aka El Jehaz; Wisam Qatawneh; Abdulrahman Atari

ِAutostrad (Arabic: أوتوستراد) is a Jordanian indie band from Amman, Jordan, formed in 2007.

== Members ==
Autostrad's original lineup consisted of

- Avo Demerjian - bass guitar and vocals
- Bashar Hamdan - saxophone and keyboard
- Hamzeh Arnaout - guitar and vocals
- Wisam Qatawneh - keyboard and vocals
- Yazan Al Rousan - guitar and main vocals
- Burhan Al Ali (Bob) - drums and vocals

There has been some changes in the line-up of the band with Hamzeh Arnaout (guitar) leaving in 2013 and Wisam Qatawneh (keyboards) also leaving and admission of Yazan Sarayrah (guitars) and Mohannad Shwayat (keyboards).

The present line-up is now made up of:

- Avo Demerjian - bass guitar and vocals
- Bashar Hamdan - saxophone and keyboard
- Yazan Al Rousan - guitar, percussion and main vocals
- Burhan Al Ali (Bob) - drums and vocals
- Yazan Sarayrah - lead guitar
- Mohannad Shwayat - Keyboard

== Music ==
Autostrad's music is influenced by a mix of rock, reggae, Latin and funk combined with their own lyrics written in the Jordanian dialect. The topics draw inspiration from everyday life in Jordan, the group conveys stories of love, struggle, financial challenges, drug abuse, and finding oneself through their music. The band has gained popularity amongst Jordanian youth because of their music evokes daily life in the country. They have released four studio albums: Fi Autostrad (2008), Autostrad (2011), Nitrogen (2013) and Turathi (2017).

== Discography ==
=== Albums ===
Fi Autostrad (2008)
No.	Title	Length
1.	"Safar"	7:30
2.	"Mirsal"	3:16
3.	"Kul Shay Jotabel"	4:22
4.	"Fekrak"	3:26
5.	"Asmar"	4:09
6.	"Habseh o Lamseh"	5:38
7.	"Kanabaye"	4:23
8.	"Mafi Eshi Tsawi 8:24"	8:24
9.	"Alf Ta7ieh"	3:05
10.	"Ya Salam"	3:30
Total length:		47:43

Autostrad 2011 (2011)
No.	Title	Length
1.	"Ana Bukra M3atel"	4:16
2.	"Ihna Inhabasna"	3:44
3.	"Kul Yom"	3:51
4.	"Istanna Shwai"	6:32
5.	"Galbi"	5:22
6.	"Kanabay"	3:34
7.	"Rahat Ya Khal"	8:32
Total length:		35:51

Nitrogen (2013)
No.	Title	Length
1.	"Khalas"	3:22
2.	"Malak Malak"	4:14
3.	"Mashtoob"	4:34
4.	"Mashi Bi Sur3it Alf"	3:08
5.	"Mish Gader"	3:53
6.	"Seebak min Asaleebak"	3:01
7.	"Tafjeer"	5:54
Total length:		28:06

Turtathy (Inward Expansion) (2017)
No.	Title	Length
1.	"Om El Dibal"	5:06
2.	"Rodi Sha'ratek"	4:52
3.	"Ya Mshabeb"	4:30
4.	"Al Samer"	4:08
5.	"Dar AlHebaieb"	3:40
6.	"Arous Al Bahr"	5:33
7.	"Ya Zareef Al-Toul"	5:09
8.	"Ya Rouman"	4:13
9.	"Hjeini"	4:26
10.	"Ya Ain"	5:36
11.	"Ala Al Salasel"	3:27
Total length:		50:40

=== Singles ===
- Habeetak Bel Turki (2015)
- Orkod 3al Gym (2018)
- Mgat3ni (2018)
- Alber (2019)
- Dawwar (2020)
- Ghareeb (2020)
- Matrooh (2020)
- Mafi Wagt (2021)
- Fekrak (vol.2) (2021)
- Betloom (2022)
- Beghyabek (2022)
- Talajat (2023)
- Nasini (2023)
- احكي فلسطين (Say Palestine) (2023)

== Tours and appearances ==
In 2014, they were invited to play in London as part of their tour. It was their first time playing outside the Arab World.

They have also appeared several times on television, most notably when they were featured in a show by Ro'ya TV and also when they were hosted by Bassem Youssef on Egyptian TV show called Al Bernameg. They have also appeared in a number of RedBull SoundClash concerts, their first being in 2014 against Jordanian band El Morabba3.

== See also ==
- Music of Jordan
- Arabic music
