= Aziz Maraka =

Jordanian composer, singer, performer, recording artist, and producer

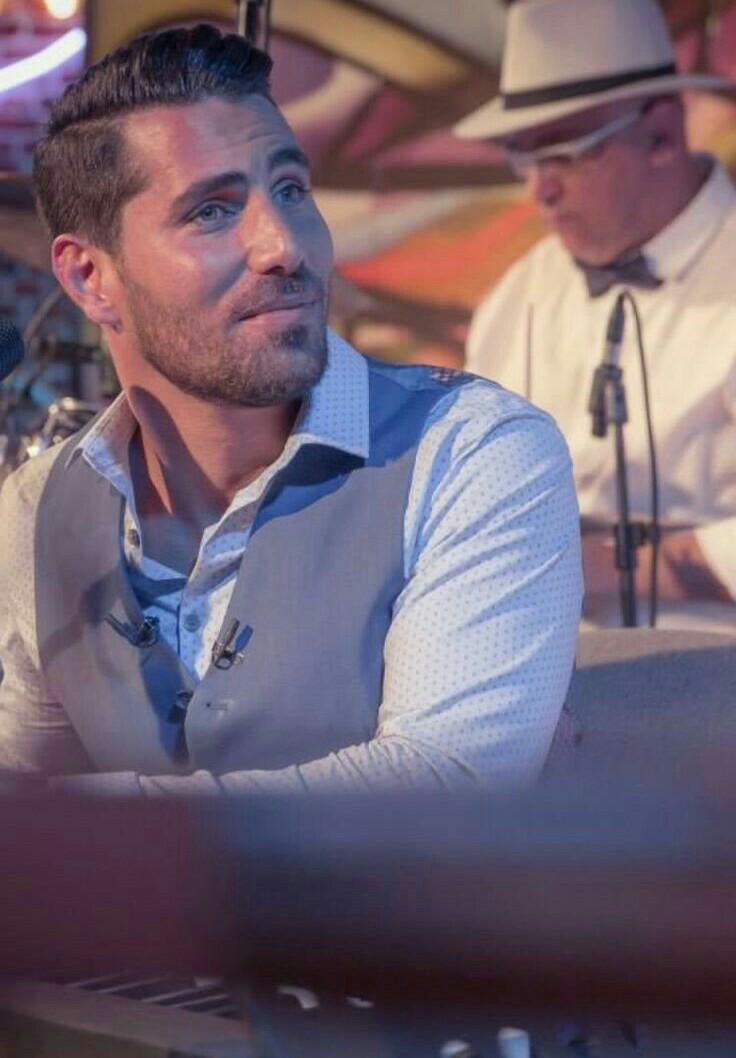
- Born: Abdul Aziz Maraka; 22 June 1983 (age 43); Tunis, Tunisia
- Occupations: Performer, producer
- Years active: 1996–present
- Website: www.azizmaraka.com

Aziz Maraka (Arabic: عزيز مرقة; born 22 June 1983), is a Jordanian composer, singer, performer, and producer. Maraka created a music style called "Razz", an Arabic rock-jazz fusion that garnered regional attention. He also released materials as Azis Maraka & Razz, including the album Master Copy.

== Early life ==
Maraka was born in Tunisia to a Palestinian father and a Lebanese mother. With the support of his parents, Aziz began performing keyboard for his school band. At the age of 12, he won a nationwide competition for original composition on keyboard. Moving to Jordan, after attending the Music School in Amman, he received a scholarship for PLUS Program to study in the United States. His first hit song, "Bent El Nas", was written as part of his senior graduation project, along with several other songs from his self-titled debut album. This album was later distributed by the Lebanese record label Ekaa in 2008.

== Career ==
Aziz released his first album Master Copy in 2008. The song "Bint Al Nas" (Arabic: بنت الناس) (girl of the people in Arabic) was the first of his songs to become known throughout the Arabic pop-music culture. His next official radio release was in 2009, "Najeh", (Arabic: ناجح meaning Successful) for the senior class after passing their final exams. The song became hugely popular for teenagers across the region. "Ma Baqool Assef" (Arabic: ما بقول أسف meaning I don't say sorry) debuted on radios in 2010.

Maraka has performed with a new style of music, which he termed as "Razz", an Arabic Jazz-Rock fusion. Maraka traveled around the world in several festivals and events, including a Red Bull soundclash event with a local alternative rock band; JadaL. The concert reportedly gathered a 4,000 people audience.

In 2011, Aziz created his company "Maestro Entertainment" as a music and event production business. In October 2011, Maestro Entertainment launched "BAB 1" (Bands Across Borders) as the first annual concert and comedy platform in Jordan. It featured local popular comedian Mohammed Lahham and singers Farah Siraj, Yazan Haifawi, and Alaa Wardi.

A BAB Music Festival was in August 2016 and featured a lineup of alternative and hip hop artists, including Adonis, DJ Sotosura, Muqata’a, Satti, El Far3i, Amer Al Taher, El Morabba3, Dakn, Edd Abbas, and Yazan Haifawi.

== Discography ==
=== Albums ===
- 2008: Master Copy (Aziz Maraka & Razz)
- 2010: Leka@Eka3 (in Arabic لقاءات إيقاع) (Aziz Maraka & Razz, Ressala, Mashrou3 Leila)

== Videography ==
- 2014 – Sme3tek – Directed by David Frost
- 2014 – Meen Gallak – Directed by David Frost
- 2014 – Time – Directed by David Frost
- 2015 – Beat it (Cover) – Directed by David Frost
