= Mike Massy =

Lebanese singer (born 1982)

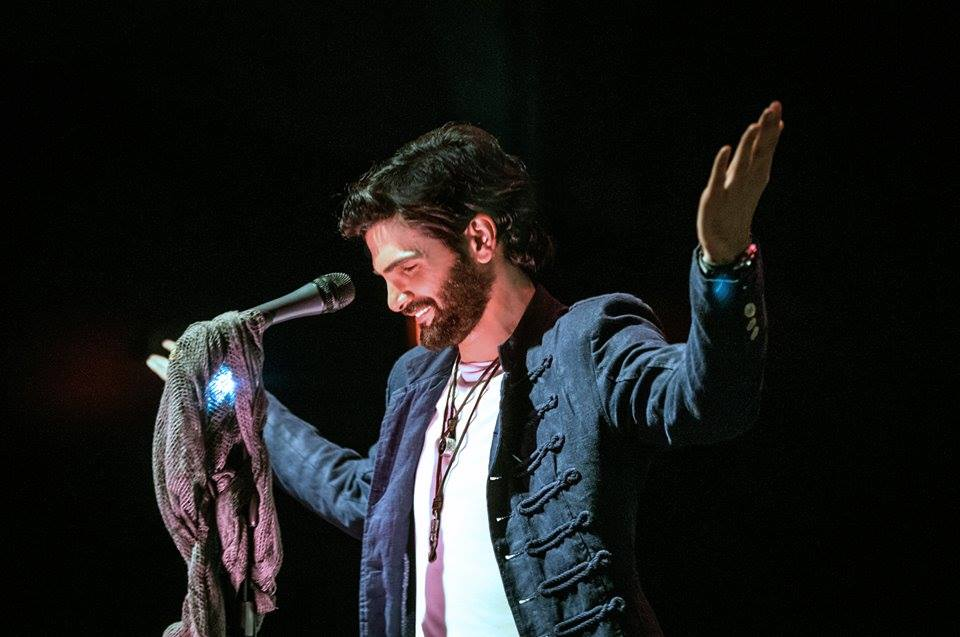
- Massy performing, March 2014

Background information
- Born: Michael El Massih; 31 March 1982 (age 44); Jounieh, Lebanon
- Origin: Anfeh, Lebanon
- Genres: Jazz, Arabic, pop, baroque, Andalusian, world music, chanson
- Occupations: Singer, songwriter, composer, actor, voice coach, music producer
- Instruments: Vocals, piano
- Years active: 2003–present
- Website: www.mikemassy.com

Michael El Massih (born 31 March 1982), known professionally as Mike Massy (Arabic: مايك ماسي), is a Lebanese-born singer, songwriter, film score composer, arranger, pianist, actor and celebrity vocal coach whose musical register fluctuates between Arabic lyrical singing, the repertoire of world music and French chansons. He began his career in 2003 by releasing his debut album Anta Houriyati. In 2011, Massy released Ya Zaman (O Good Old Days), to critical acclaim, peaking atop of the Lebanese charts, earning him the Murex d'Or (Golden Murex award) for "Innovation in Music". In 2015, he founded "Voice Matters Workshop" the first vocal coaching and oratory communication hub in the MENA region.

During his long years of experience, he has collaborated with big names in the international music scene such as Dominick Farinacci, Tommy LiPuma, The Sofia Metropolitan Philharmonic Orchestra, Fadia Tomb El Hage, Jahida Wehbe, Sary and Ayad Khalifeh, etc.. In 2017, Mike Massy released his first EP in French, entitled "Le Délire". This EP was a success in the World Music charts in Europe, as it reached Number 1 on "iTunes" in "Switzerland" and Number 3 in "France". His collaboration with Pascal Obispo and Christophe Barratier, who offered him to play the title role in Jésus de Nazareth à Jérusalem opened the doors to his career in France. Massy's discography combines more than 17 albums (7 Studio Albums, 5 Live Albums, 5 Original Soundtracks), numerous music videos, multiple musical shows, television series, short films and plays.

== Career ==
=== Musical journey and influences ===
Originally from the Lebanese town of Anfeh, Mike Massy was born in 1982 in the city of Jounieh, where he was raised. Amidst the raging battles and the ugliness of war, he found a harbor of peace in the angelic voice of Fairuz and the nostalgic melodies of Zaki Nassif. Soon, he was fascinated by the new world he had discovered and at the age of nine, he started his first piano lessons. Growing up, he was drawn to the French chanson music genre, in particular the authentic poetry of Jacques Brel and the grandeur of Charles Aznavour. At the age of twelve, Massy joined the National High Conservatory of Music where he continued his classical piano training. At seventeen, his deep natural curiosity and immense love of challenge pushed him to learn Arabic opera and old Andalusian mouwachahat. He also trained in Oriental and Occidental singing. However, Massy's artistic thirst was not quenched. Driven by his passion for theatre, he joined the Faculty of Fine Arts where he graduated in Dramatic Art from the Lebanese University in Beirut. Simultaneously, he followed Jazz Ballet courses at the Arabesque dancing school, eventually joining its acclaimed troupe. Mike Massy's composing and singing started very early on, when he was a child behind his piano. His innate talent and solid musical and artistic education evolved into a new style marked with novelty, distinctiveness and refinement, remaining both simple and inimitable.

=== Bravo, the borderline album ===
After playing the role of "Jesus" in France, Mike Massy returns to the music scene with a 9th studio album, "Bravo", written, composed and produced by Massy himself. This album comprising 9 tracks in Lebanese and literary Arabic, was written and recorded between Brussels and Beirut. "Bravo" refers to one of the songs on the album.It features Mike Massy's vocal signature, accompanied by a pop production, combined with a classical‐acoustic orchestration. Mixing acidic lyrics with pop melodies, Mike Massy launches the challenge of a new sound. With a subtle blend of tradition and modernity, this album is the new positioning of Mike Massy, who manages the transition from traditional to modern with astonishing ease.

=== Ya Zaman, the breakthrough ===
Released in November 2011, Ya Zaman marked the real debut of Mike Massy's career. Described as gracefully rooted in nostalgia, the album was an immediate success, scoring the first rank on the list of albums sold in Lebanon for more than eight consecutive weeks, and remaining on top of the radio charts in the Middle East and North Africa for around two years." With major hits like "Ghayyer Lawn Ouyounak" (Change the color of your eyes) and "Khalasna Ba’a" (Enough is enough), Massy left a fresh mark on the Lebanese, Middle Eastern and world music scene ranging between deep romance and harsh social critique. His cover of "Ya Achikata l Wardi" (Lover of the roses) by the great Zaki Nassif was highly acclaimed as reviving Lebanon's musical heritage in a modern, stylish and respectful way. With 11 original tracks written, composed and arranged by Mike Massy, Ya Zaman sales exceeded expectations. The album went viral bringing Massy's unique music and identity to thousands of fans from all over the world. It also thrust Massy on national and international stages and owned him the prestigious Murex d’Or for innovation in Music in 2012.

=== Tannoura Maxi ===
In 2012, he wrote and composed the soundtrack of the controversial Tannoura Maxi, the feature-film debut of Lebanese director Joe Bou Eid.

=== Mike Massy Live on Broadway then Bulgaria ===
Massy's continued success in the Arabic music scene raised interest in the United States, where Massy made his debut Broadway concert in 2013 at the Merkin Concert Hall. Massy performed songs from his repertoire, in addition to well-known Lebanese and Arabic classics. Mike Massy's concert on Broadway led to a collaboration with Bulgarian Producer Vlada Tomova for a number of concerts in Bulgaria. Massy also composed an orchestral piece and recorded it with the Philharmonic Symphony Orchestra of Bulgaria.

=== Oriental Music Scene at Stanford University ===
Mike Massy was invited to Stanford University in March 2014 for a concert on oriental music and a lecture about the Middle Eastern music scene and his musical influences. Mike Massy's lecture got great positive feedback at Stanford; he was again invited to give another concert and lecture in March 2015.

=== Naseej ===
While working on new projects, Mike Massy met Ayad & Sary Khalifé and decided to create a Sufi Andalusian music with a hint of Jazz and Oriental that later on sees light at the Zouk Mikael Festival. The album, entitled Naseej (literally "the action of weaving") was composed and recorded in Paris, France, and again, in Ghent, and Brussels like Massy's last album. The project had its premiere at the Zouk Mikael Festival on August 7, 2014, with the album released the same month.

=== Oriental Jazz ===
In April 2015, Mike Massy was the first Middle Eastern Arabic singer/ songwriter to conquer the heart of "Jazz at Lincoln Centre", as a guest artist in its extension in Doha, Qatar, where he performed with the musicians of the "Jazz at Lincoln Centre" and the "Qatar Philharmonic Orchestra". Twelve consecutive performances at the "Jazz at Lincoln Centre", and another outdoor concert by the gulf, at the "Museum of Islamic Arts" in Doha took place in Qatar presenting Oriental Jazz and introducing the traditional Lebanese Dabkeh to the jazz rituals.

=== Mike Massy Kan Yama Cannes live in the heart of the Croisette ===
In May 2015, Massy held a concert during the Cannes Film Festival at the Croisette that was live streamed on the internet and on big screen on the Croisette avenue. He sang in Lebanese, French and English. .

=== Music production career ===
In addition to composing arranging more than 32 albums for children in English and French language, produced by Editions Kédémos, Mike Massy musically produced 3 albums topping the Lebanese hits for different artists [Sevine] Je Grandis (2016), [Re-Mi Bendali] Ma Nseet (2015) and [Yvonne El Hachem] Maaleish (2015), [Nada] Yemken, Sayf W Layl, Al Baadou Nouhibbouhoum, Ave Maria, My Mood that Day. And Composed, Arranged and Produced a number of singles for Lebanese and Jordanian Artists: [Cynthya Karam] Albi Byehmoul, [Macadi Nahas] Kholis el Haki, Tiji Nsafer, [Jahida Wehbe], [Tania Kassis] Kam Marra, [Haifa Kamal] Ma Tensa Ouyouni.

== Discography ==
- Ila ssama atba’ouka (2003)
- Itsy Bitsy Spider (Soundtrack) (2008)
- Ya Zaman (2011)
- Tannoura Maxi (Soundtrack) (2012)
- B Beirut (Beirut Marathon Official song) (2012)
- One Woman Song (UN Women theme song for International Women's Day) (2014)
- Naseej (Mike Massy, Ayad & Sary Khalifé) (2014)
- Kalbon Kabeer (BraveHeart NGO song) (2015)
- Anta Houriyati [Remastered Version] (2016)
- Kermali In collaboration with ABAAD NGO and women survivors of domestic violence (2016)
- Le Délire, EP French songs containing a cover of "Ne Me Quitte Pas" by the legendary Jacques Brel, adapted in Lebanese (2017)
- Jésus de Nazareth à Jérusalem Soundtrack Musical in France (2017)
- Bravo (2018)

== Awards ==
Year	Award	Category	Work	Result
2011	Murex d'Or	Innovation in Music	"Ya Zaman"	Won
