= Zaid Khaled =

Jordanian musician

- Origin: Amman, Jordan
- Genres: Jordanian, Arabic Music, Pop music
- Occupation: Musician
- Years active: since 2021

Zaid Khaled (Arabic: زيد خالد) is a Jordanian-Palestinian pop-alternative musician, songwriter, and visual artist from Amman, Jordan. Emerging during the COVID-19 pandemic in the beginning of the 2020s, Khaled is known for music that merges 1990s Arabic pop, alternative, and electronic influences and for his distinctive personal style that challenges regional gender and fashion norms.

== Life and career ==
Zaid Khaled was born and raised in Amman, Jordan. He studied filmmaking at a university in Amman and was active in Jordan's art and music scenes from the early 2010s, working in videography, music video production, and event management. He contributed visual work to other artists; for example, he created a digital visual loop installation for the indie electro-pop band Garaseen's sonic exhibition at the Jordan National Gallery of Fine Arts.

He began writing and recording music in 2020 during the COVID-19 lockdown, describing the initial process in an interview as a form of therapy. Encouraged by peers in the Amman music community, including artists Idreesi and Synaptik, he publicly shared his work and quickly garnered attention. His debut album, Tayarat O Sayarat, was produced in collaboration with Egyptian producer El Waili. He also has other collaborations with this producer.

His 2022 double single EP Le Blad was recorded with Egyptian hip-hop producer 5mstashr. In 2025, he released the single Khatem, a collaboration with Syrian producer Ahmed Diaa.

== Musical style and artistry ==
Khaled's music is described as pop-alternative, characterized by sentimental melodies, auto-tuned vocals, and lyrics drawn from his personal experiences. He cites a contrast of influences including 1990s Arabic pop, the band Mashrou' Leila, and the artist Enzel, alongside the broader alternative and hip-hop waves that grew out of the Arab Spring era. His work has been compared to Moustafa Amar.

== Public identity and advocacy ==
Zaid Khaled has a characteristic fashion style, which incorporates vests, flared pants, mixed textures, hats, wigs, and bandanas. He describes his style as a deliberate push against mainstream masculine dress codes and gender binaries in the region.

A central aspect of his public identity is his openness about his experience with eczema, a chronic inflammatory skin condition he has had since childhood. He has spoken about the social stigma associated with hair loss and skin conditions, using his platform to foster discussion. A pivotal moment was a 2020 Instagram post where he publicly discussed his condition and chose to stop covering his head with hats, embracing it as part of his identity. He connects this directly to his artistry, stating that eczema shaped his personality and that he often writes songs when experiencing physical pain from the condition.

== Discography ==
Albums

- Tayarat O Sayarat (2021)
- Ahla Ayam Hayati (2023)

EPs

- Le Blad (double single, 2022)

Singles

- "Khatem" (2025)

Featured Appearances

- "3dd El Sokan" by El Waili
- "Leh La" on Arsinek's EP SAYAD (2025)
