= Alaa Wardi =

Saudi singer of Iranian origin

- Born: 13 January 1987 (age 39); Riyadh, Saudi Arabia
- Genres: Pop
- Occupations: Singer, songwriter, YouTuber
- Years active: 2011–present
- Member of: Hayajan
- Website: www.alaawardi.com

Alaa Wardi (Arabic: علاء وردي, Persian: علا واردی; born 13 January 1987) is a Saudi-born singer, songwriter, a cappella artist, and producer. He gained popularity through the online video sharing platform, YouTube, where he publishes covers of Middle Eastern, English, Bollywood and K-pop hits, and original ballads. Wardi released his album Fi Ba7ri in 2015 and Madinat Al Salah in 2016. He is also part of the Arab rock and pop band Hayajan.

== Career ==
Alaa Wardi studied music and sound engineering at the University of Jordan, and after graduating in 2008, he moved back to Riyadh to work and focus on his music.

He produced the popular English language musical video "No Woman, No Drive" in October 2013 with comedians Hisham Fageeh and Fahad Albutairi as a satirical comment on the Saudi Arabian ban on women drivers. It is sung a capella by Fageeh backed by Wardi and Albutairi to the tune of Bob Marley's "No Woman, No Cry".

In June 2015, Wardi released his album Fi Ba7ri. The lyrics for the album's songs were written by Aziz Maraka, a Jordanian musician. His Hindi cover versions of Bollywood hits "Pehla Nasha" and "Jiya Re" became famous, as well as his mash-up "Evolution of Arabic Music" which is an a capella mash-up of 42 Arabic songs from the 1930s to 2010s. He has collaborated with a great number of other Arab and international artists including Peter Hollens.

In August 2019, Wardi released an a capella medley of songs by Lebanese singer Fairuz, featuring Jordanian indie singer Haifa Kamal. The song went viral, with the video reaching more than 800,000 views in 9 days. Wardi was then contacted by representatives of Rahbani family, to immediately remove the video or serious legal action would be taken.

== Personal life ==
He was born to Iranian parents in Riyadh, Saudi Arabia. His family owns a furniture business in Riyadh. He married Sinem Güneş in 2015 in Bodrum, Turkey.

== Discography ==
=== Solo albums ===
Album name	Release date	Tracks
Fi Ba7ri	2015	1. "Ya Fata" (2:49); 2. "Fi Biladi" (1:44); 3. "Fi Ba7ri" (2:47); 4. "Thona2i" (2:36); 5. "5Asran" (2:05); 6. "Amwaaj" (3:14); 7. "Simba" (2:08); 8. "Sa7rawi" (2:28)
Madinat Al Salah	2016	1. "Madinat Al-Salah" (2:28); 2. "Yawrood" (2:35); 3. "Tkooni Ma3ay" (2:30); 4. "Weli" (2:23); 5. "Ya Rabbi" (1:51); 6. "Last Drop of Hope" (2:35)

=== Original singles ===
- "Sha3ri Yot3eboni"
- "Risala Ela..."
- "Ye5lef"
- "Garfan Bel-So3odia"
- "Fe Shi Makan" (feat. Angie Obeid)
- "Laying in Bed After a Good Day"
- "7aram"
- "Ma3gool"
- "Shalamonti Fel7al"
- "Wenti Mastaneti"
- "Evolution of Arabic Music"
- "Overpopulated"

=== Cover songs ===
Song title	Featuring	Cover of
Jee Le Zaraa		Talaash
Happy (Telfaz11 cover)		Pharrell Williams
Aïcha		Jean-Jacques Goldman and Cheb Khaled
Royals (Arabic Beat) cover		Lorde
No Woman, No Drive	Fahad Albutairi, Hisham Fageeh	Adaptation of Bob Marley song "No Woman, No Cry"
Jai Ho	Peter Hollens	Soundtrack from Slumdog Millionaire
Mr. Simple	Wonho Chung	Super Junior
Pehla Nasha		Soundtrack of Pehla Nasha
Jiya Re		Soundtrack of Jab Tak Hai Jaan
Stay	Mikky Ekko	Rihanna
Ela Mata	Sultan Al-Jameel	Asala Nasri
Osad Einy		Amr Diab
Wa7ashteny	Mohab	Amr Diab
Şıkıdım		Tarkan
Chandelier	Dima Bawab	Sia
Desert Rose	Peter Hollens	Sting / Cheb Mami
Fairuz Medley	Haifa Kamal	Fairuz
