= Toni Qattan =

Arab singer (born 1985)

- طوني قطان
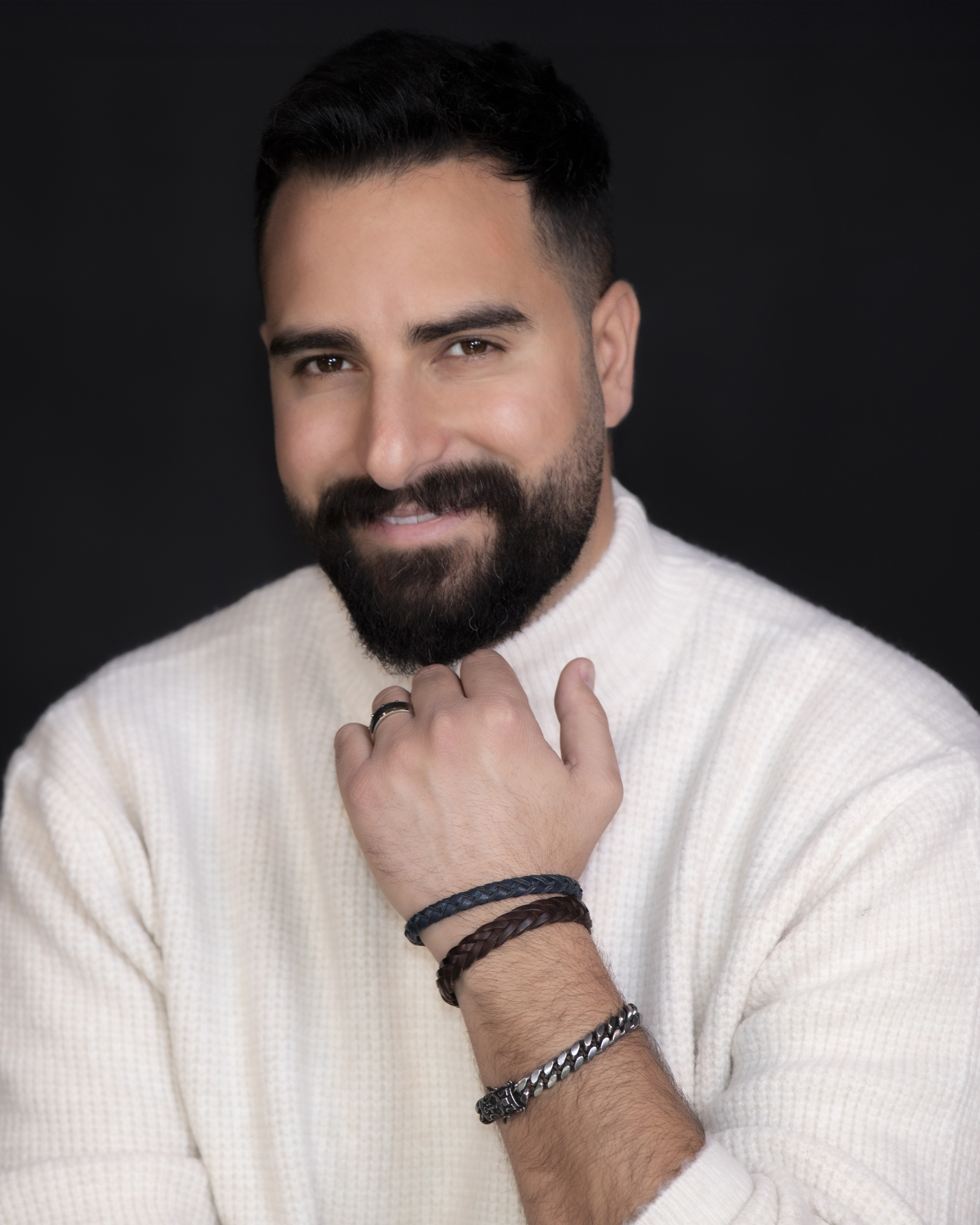
- Toni Qattan in 2025
- Born: Anton George Qattan; 11 August 1985 (age 40); Jerusalem
- Education: Applied Science Private University
- Spouse: Dana Abu Khader (2011–present)
- Children: 2
- Musical career
- Genres: Arab pop
- Occupations: Singer; songwriter; music producer; composer; actor
- Instruments: Vocal, piano, guitar
- Years active: 2005–present
- Label: TQ Music
- Website: www.toniqattan.net

Toni Qattan (Arabic: طوني قطان; born 11 August 1985) is a Jordanian singer, songwriter, and music producer of Palestinian origin from the town of Beit Jala. Toni Qattan was born on August 11, 1985, in Jerusalem. His musical talent emerged early; at the age of eight, he began learning to play the guitar and piano. After mastering composition, he studied both Arabic (Eastern) and Western singing styles. He also holds a bachelor's degree in Business Administration from the University of Applied Science in Amman.

Toni Qattan is regarded as one of the first Jordanian singers to achieve Arab-wide fame without participating in talent shows. He is also considered the first Jordanian singer to produce his own original songs and music videos, paving the way for many Jordanian artists who later inspired others to create their own music rather than limit themselves to national or classical song renditions.

== Early life ==
Toni Qattan was born into a middle-class family. Although his father worked as a civil engineer, he was deeply passionate about music and recognized Toni's artistic talent from a young age. He supported his son's musical development by bringing him professional teachers specialized in singing and instrumental training. As a child, Toni learned to play the oud, then moved on to master the guitar and piano, in addition to studying Andalusian muwashahat and classical Arabic songs under the guidance of expert vocal coaches. In 2003, Qattan enrolled at the University of Applied Science in Amman, initially intending to study civil engineering like his father. However, during his first year, he met lyricist Omar Sari and music arranger Khaled Mustafa, with whom he collaborated to produce his first original songs — marking the beginning of his professional music career. He later changed his major and graduated with a bachelor's degree in Business Administration instead of engineering.

== Music career ==
Toni Qattan became a professional singer in 2005, when he presented a number of musical works:

In 2005 He released a single titled "Awadtani Sahar Al-Layali" (عودتني سهر الليالي), with lyrics by Bilal Al-Sari, composed by Toni Qattan, arranged by Khaled Khawalda. It was filmed as a music video with director Bilal Al-Sari in the Jabal Al-Luweibdeh area in Jordan.

In 2006 He released two singles:

"Men Donak" (من دونك), with lyrics and composition by Toni Qattan, arranged by Khaled Mustafa. It was filmed in the Ballouneh area and at the Aquamarina Hotel in Tabarja, north of Beirut, with director Hani Khachfeh.

"Ayouni Sahrana" (عيوني سهرانة), with lyrics by Shadi Farah and arranged by Roger Abi Akl. The video was filmed with director Hani Khachfeh in the Chouf region in Lebanon.

In 2007 He released a music video for the song "Eb’ed w Rouh" (إبعد وروح), with lyrics and composition by Bilal Al-Sari and arrangement by Wissam Ghazawi. It was filmed in a garage for old buses in Beirut, Lebanon.

In 2008 He released his first album, produced by Radio Fann, Mazzika, and Alam El-Fan, in April, titled "Malkesh Zay" (ملكش زي). It contains 10 songs. On the lyrics side he cooperated with the poets Omar Sari, Bilal Al-Sari, and Abu Zeid Hassan, and some songs were written by Toni himself. All the melodies were composed by Toni Qattan, and the musical arrangements were by Khaled Mustafa and Khaled Khawalda. The song "Malkesh Zay" was filmed as a music video with director Jad Sawaya in the Batroun area in Lebanon.

Songs of the album “Malkesh Zay” in order:

Malkesh Zay

Ma Ba’etsh Leek

Fein El-Malak

Beyes’ab Alayya

Safri

Hal-‘Omar

‘Ashanak Enta

La Tzeed

Awwal Dam‘a

Ma Ba’etsh Leek (instrumental)

He also released, in October of the same year, a single titled "Ahlef Yameen Allah" (أحلف يمين الله), with lyrics by the poet Omar Sari, and composed and arranged by Toni Qattan.

In 2009 Toni Qattan presented a song titled "Rah Terja‘ Falasteen" (راح ترجع فلسطين), which he wrote and composed in January 2009.

In June of the same year, he was chosen to compose and sing a song titled "Ahl Al-Himma" (أهل الهمة), which was the official song for the initiative of Her Majesty Queen Rania Al-Abdullah of Jordan, on the occasion of the 10th anniversary of His Majesty King Abdullah II ibn Al-Hussein assuming his constitutional powers. The song featured the participation of Jordanian artist Omar Al-Abdallat.

In 2010 He released a single in March titled "Maghrum" (مغروم), written and composed by himself, with musical arrangement by Haitham Qa‘war. It was filmed as a music video under the direction of Lebanese director Marc Karam.

He also released a single in October of the same year titled "Rouhi w Rouhak" (روحي وروحك), written, composed, and arranged by Wael Al-Sharqawi.

In 2011 He released a single titled "Law Maktoub Alayya" (لو مكتوب عليا), written, composed, and arranged by himself. The song talks about his struggle with illness and expresses a psychological state he was going through at the beginning of his diagnosis.

In 2012 He released a single in February titled "Afa Ya Ghali" (أفا يا غالي), a Gulf-dialect song, with lyrics by the poet Omar Sari and composed and arranged by Qattan himself.

He also released a single in May of the same year titled "‘Al Waad" (عالوعد), written, composed, and arranged by Wael Al-Sharqawi.

He released a single in July of the same year titled "Ahwetko Mashroubeh" (قهوتكو مشروبة), a Jordanian-dialect song written, composed, and arranged by Ali Khair.

In 2013 In February, he released the music video for his famous song "Afa Ya Ghali", which he filmed in Amman under the direction of Rouhi Lutfi.

He also released, in May of the same year, a single titled "‘Einha Alayya" (عينها عليا), with lyrics by Abdulrahman Assem, composed by Karim Ashour, and arranged by Mansi. It was produced in Cairo.

In 2015 He released a single in January titled "Ba‘shaqak Sadeqni" (بعشقك صدقني), with lyrics by Areej Dou, composed by Salim Salameh, and arranged by Rojie Khoury. It was recorded in Lebanon.

He released a single in April of the same year titled "El-Bilad Talabet Ahlha" (البلاد طلبت اهلها), written and composed by himself and arranged by Haitham Qa‘war.

He released a song titled "Bas Bas" (بس بس), which achieved very wide success, in late July of the same year. The song is written, composed, and arranged by Toni Qattan himself, and was recorded at Qa‘war Studios.

He released a single titled "Serti Halali" (صرتي حلالي), written, composed, and arranged by Wael Al-Sharqawi, which garnered more than 20 million views on YouTube.

At the end of 2015 he released a song titled "Ah Ya Weili" (آه يا ويلي), with lyrics by Omar Sari, composed by Toni Qattan himself, and arranged by Seif.

In 2016

At the beginning of 2016 he released a song titled "Allah Yerham" (الله يرحم), with lyrics by Omar Sari, composed by Toni Qattan, and arranged by Ahmad Rami.

In February 2016 he released a song titled "Enti Enti" (انتي انتي), with lyrics and composition by Suleiman Abboud and arrangement by Mounir Ja‘far.

In March 2016 he released the song "Sheltak Min Hayati" (شلتك من حياتي), written, composed, and arranged by himself.

In 2017 He released the song "Dinya Ma Teswa" (دنيا ما تسوى), with lyrics and composition by Mohammad Sha‘ath and arrangement by Yousef Baltaji, and directed by Hamoudeh Saadeh.

In 2017 he released a new music video for the song "Ya ‘Eib El-‘Eib" (يا عيب العيب), with lyrics, composition, and arrangement by Wael Al-Sharqawi, filmed in cooperation with director Abdulrahman Issa.

He released the song "Yalli Betheb El-Na‘na‘" (يلي بتحب النعنع), which achieved massive success, surpassing 100 million views on YouTube.

He released the single "Tal El-Qamar" (طل القمر), with lyrics by Omar Sari, composed by Toni Qattan, and musically arranged by Mohammad Al-Qaisi, which surpassed more than 20 million views on YouTube.

In 2018

He released the song "Mostaheel" (مستحيل), with lyrics by Amer Lawand and composition by Salim Salameh; it was filmed as a music video with director Abdulrahman Issa.

He released the song "Ma Baddi Hob" (ما بدي حب), with lyrics by Imad Issa and composition by Omar Al-Khair, filmed with director Abdulrahman Issa. He released the song "Rahou" (راحوا), with lyrics by Omar Sari, composed by Toni Qattan, and arranged by Seif El-Din Muneer.

In 2019

He released the song "Kouni Li El-Mousiqa" (كونيلي الموسيقى), with lyrics by Omar Sari, composition by Mohammad Bashar, and arrangement by Rami Raees, filmed with director Abdulrahman Issa.

He released the duet "Hatha Qalbi" (هذا قلبي) with Bisan Ismail, with lyrics by Mohammad Al-Jubouri, composition by Haider Kittara, and arrangement by Haider Kittara, filmed with director Abdulrahman Issa.

He released the song "‘Ammal Tehlo" (عمال تحلو), with lyrics and composition by Aziz El-Shafie and arrangement by Toni Qattan.

In 2020

He released the song "Wahid Etneen" (واحد اتنين), with lyrics by Riyad Al-Ali, composition by Mohammad Issa, and arrangement by Toni Qattan.

In 2021

He released the song "Bint Bladi" (بنت بلادي), with lyrics, composition, and arrangement by Wael Al-Sharqawi, filmed as a music video with director Abdulrahman Issa.

He released the song "Hobna Dawla" (حبنا دولة), with lyrics by Bashar Hawamdeh, composition by Mohammad Bashar, and arrangement by Khaled Mustafa, filmed with director Abdulrahman Issa.

He released the song "Nessini w Ghab" (نسيني وغاب), with lyrics by Ibrahim Mohammad, and composition and arrangement by Toni Qattan, filmed with director Abdulrahman Issa.

In 2022

He released the duet "Bedna N’alebha Aleq" (بدنا نقلبها قلق) with Muhannad Khalaf, with lyrics by Yasser Hamad, composition by Toni Qattan and Muhannad Khalaf, and arrangement by Toni Qattan, filmed with director Abdul Fattah Ismail.

He released the song "Wenak Ya Hob" (وينك يا حب), written, composed, and arranged by Toni Qattan himself.

In 2023

He released the song "Jadeer Bel Zikr" (جدير بالذكر), with lyrics by Ibrahim Mohammad, composition by Rami Gamal, and arrangement by Toni Qattan, filmed with director Abdulrahman Issa.

In 2024

He released the song "Khalina Waqe‘iyyeen" (خلينا واقعيين), written, composed, and arranged by Toni Qattan.

He released the song "Lel-Beia‘" (للبيع), with lyrics by Omar Sari, composition by Mohammad Bashar, and arrangement by Toni Qattan.

In 2025

He released the song "Aqwa Noa‘" (أقوى نوع), with lyrics and composition by Ihab Rouza and arrangement by Ayham Rouza Al-Fa‘ouri.

He released the song "Yalla Nwalla‘ha" (يلا نولعها), with lyrics by Ibrahim Mohammad, composition by Toni Qattan, and arrangement by Amin Nabil.

He released the song "Ya Amar" (يا قمر), with lyrics by Khaled Al-Nimri, and composition and arrangement by Toni Qattan.

He released the song "Mahla Bentak Ya Hammati" (محلى بنتك يا حماتي), with lyrics by Khaled Al-Nimri, composition by Toni Qattan, and arrangement by Fadi Al-Fahmawi.

He released the song "Akhir Hammi" (آخر همي), with lyrics by Khaled Al-Nimri, and composition and arrangement by Toni Qattan.

=== Singles ===
| Song | Lyrics | Composition | Arrangement | Studio | Year |
|---|---|---|---|---|---|
| Ya Ghayeb (يا غايب) | Khaled Al-Nimri | Toni Qattan | Toni Qattan | TQ MUSIC | 2025 |
| ‘Aziza (عزيزة) | Toni Qattan | Toni Qattan | Toni Qattan | TQ MUSIC | 2025 |
| Akhir Hammi (آخر همي) | Khaled Al-Nimri | Toni Qattan | Toni Qattan | TQ MUSIC | 2025 |
| Mahla Bentak Ya Hammati (محلى بنتك يا حماتي) | Khaled Al-Nimri | Toni Qattan | Fadi Al-Fahmawi | Fadi Al-Fahmawi | 2025 |
| Ya Amar (يا قمر) | Khaled Al-Nimri | Toni Qattan | Toni Qattan | TQ MUSIC | 2025 |
| Jirani Halla Halla (جيراني هالله هالله) | Folk | Folk | Khaled Al-Ali | Khaled Al-Ali | 2025 |
| Yalla Nwalla‘ha (يلا نولعها) | Ibrahim Mohammad | Toni Qattan | Amin Nabil | Amin Nabil | 2025 |
| Aqwa Noa‘ (أقوى نوع) | Ihab Rouza | Ayham Rouza | Al-Fa‘ouri | TQ MUSIC | 2025 |
| Khalina Waqe‘iyyeen (خلينا واقعيين) | Toni Qattan | Toni Qattan | Toni Qattan | TQ MUSIC | 2024 |
| Lel-Beia‘ (للبيع) | Omar Sari | Mohammad Bashar | Toni Qattan | TQ MUSIC | 2024 |
| Shaghel Bali (شاغل بالي) | Toni Qattan | Toni Qattan | Toni Qattan | TQ MUSIC | 2024 |
| Zaffeh Mahlakou (زفة محلاكو) | Wael Al-Sharqawi | Wael Al-Sharqawi | Wael Al-Sharqawi | Wael Al-Sharqawi | 2023 |
| Birjlek El-Yameen (برجلك اليمين) | Wael Al-Sharqawi | Wael Al-Sharqawi | Wael Al-Sharqawi | Wael Al-Sharqawi | 2023 |
| Jadeer Bel Zikr (جدير بالذكر) | Ibrahim Mohammad | Rami Gamal | Toni Qattan | Toni Qattan | 2023 |
| Wenak Ya Hob (وينك يا حب) | Toni Qattan | Toni Qattan | Toni Qattan | Toni Qattan | 2022 |
| Allo Ya Albi (الو يا قلبي) | Ibrahim Mohammad | Toni Qattan | Toni Qattan | Toni Qattan | 2022 |
| Bedna N‘alebha Aleq (بدنا نقلبها قلق) (duet with Muhannad Khalaf) | Yasser Hamad | Toni Qattan & Muhannad Khalaf | Toni Qattan | Toni Qattan | 2022 |
| Mesh La‘eb (مش لاعب) | Ibrahim Mohammad | Toni Qattan | Toni Qattan | Toni Qattan | 2021 |
| ‘Ayesh Hayati (عايش حياتي) | Toni Qattan | Toni Qattan | Toni Qattan | Toni Qattan | 2021 |
| Bint Bladi (بنت بلادي) | Wael Al-Sharqawi | Wael Al-Sharqawi | Wael Al-Sharqawi | Wael Al-Sharqawi | 2021 |
| Hobna Dawla (حبنا دولة) | Bashar Hawamdeh | Mohammad Bashar | Khaled Mustafa | Khaled Mustafa | 2021 |
| Nessini w Ghab (نسيني وغاب) | Ibrahim Mohammad | Toni Qattan | Toni Qattan | Toni Qattan | 2021 |
| Wahid Etneen (واحد اتنين) | Riyad Al-Ali | Mohammad ‘Issa | Toni Qattan | Toni Qattan | 2020 |
| Lali (لالي) | Raed Shatnawi | Toni Qattan | Toni Qattan | Toni Qattan | 2019 |
| Kouni Li El-Mousiqa (كونيلي الموسيقى) | Omar Sari | Mohammad Bashar | Rami Raees | The Studio | 2019 |
| Allah Yesamehek (الله يسامحك) | Wael Al-Sharqawi | Wael Al-Sharqawi | Wael Al-Sharqawi | Wael Al-Sharqawi | 2019 |
| Yalla (يلا) | Toni Qattan | Toni Qattan | Toni Qattan | Toni Qattan | 2019 |
| ‘Ammal Tehlo (عمال تحلو) | Aziz El-Shafie | Aziz El-Shafie | Toni Qattan | Toni Qattan | 2019 |
| Halla w Ghala (هلا وغلا) | Omar Sari | Mohammad Bashar | Toni Qattan | Toni Qattan | 2019 |
| Ana El-Hob (انا الحب) | Ibrahim Mohammad | Toni Qattan | Toni Qattan | Toni Qattan | 2019 |
| Hatha Qalbi (هذا قلبي) (duet with Bisan Ismail) | Mohammad Jabouri | Haider Kittara | Haider Kittara | Haider Kittara | 2019 |
| Akthar w Akthar (اكثر وأكثر) | Mohammad Jabouri | Mohammad Al-Fares | Haider Kittara | Haider Kittara | 2018 |
| Mostaheel (مستحيل) | Amer Lawand | Salim Salameh | Rayn | Rayn | 2018 |
| Ma Baddi Hob (ما بدي حب) | Imad Issa | Omar Al-Kheir | Seif El-Din Muneer | Safe Productions | 2018 |
| Mazabet Hali Ma‘ha (مزبط حالي معها) | Riyad Al-Ali | Mohammad ‘Issa | Toni Qattan | Toni Qattan | 2018 |
| Rahou (راحوا) | Omar Sari | Toni Qattan | Seif El-Din Muneer | Safe Productions | 2018 |
| Kanat Thawani (كانت ثواني) | Haider Al-Aseer | Hammam Hassan | Mustafa Basem | Mustafa Basem | 2017 |
| Sho Ma Alou (شو ما قالوا) | Ali Khair | Ali Khair | Osama Al-Nabr | Toni Qattan | 2017 |
| Tal El-Qamar (طل القمر) | Omar Sari | Toni Qattan | Mohammad Al-Qaisi | Music Sound | 2017 |
| Yalli Betheb El-Na‘na‘ (يلي بتحب النعنع) | Mousa Hafez | Palestinian folk | Baha’ Dawoud | Toni Qattan | 2017 |
| El-Hob El-Hob (الحب الحب) | Toni Qattan | Toni Qattan | Toni Qattan | Toni Qattan | 2017 |
| Ya ‘Eib El-‘Eib (يا عيب العيب) | Wael Al-Sharqawi | Wael Al-Sharqawi | Wael Al-Sharqawi | Wael Al-Sharqawi | 2017 |
| Dinya Ma Teswa (دنيا ما تسوى) | Mohammad Sha‘ath | Mohammad Sha‘ath | Yousef Baltaji | Sync Media | 2017 |
| ‘A Saderi Daqeitlak (عصدري دقيتلك) | Khalil Rouza | Toni Qattan | Ahmad Rami | Solo Studio | 2016. |
| Sheltak Min Hayati (شلتك من حياتي) | Toni Qattan | Toni Qattan | Toni Qattan | Toni Qattan | 2016 |
| Enti Enti (انتي انتي) | Suleiman Abboud | Suleiman Abboud | Mounir Ja‘far | Koda Studio | 2016 |
| Allah Yerham (الله يرحم) | Omar Sari | Toni Qattan | Ahmad Rami | Solo Studio | 2016 |
| Ah Ya Weili (آه يا ويلي) | Omar Sari | Toni Qattan | Seif | Solo Studio | 2015 |
| Serti Halali (صرتي حلالي) | Wael Al-Sharqawi | Wael Al-Sharqawi | Wael Al-Sharqawi | Wael Al-Sharqawi | 2015 |
| Bas Bas (بس بس) | Toni Qattan | Toni Qattan | Toni Qattan | Haitham Qa‘war | 2015 |
| El-Bilad Talabet Ahlha (البلاد طلبت اهلها) | Toni Qattan | Toni Qattan | Haitham Qa‘war | Haitham Qa‘war | 2015 |
| Ba‘shaqak Sadeqni (بعشقك صدقني) | Areej Dou | Salim Salameh | Rojie Khoury | Boudy Naoum | 2015 |
| ‘Einha ‘Alayya (عينها عليا) | Abdulrahman ‘Asim | Karim ‘Ashour | Hazem Mansi | Hazem Mansi | 2013 |
| Ahwetko Mashroubeh (قهوتكو مشروبة) | Ali Khair | Ali Khair | Ali Khair | Abu Laghd | 2012 |
| ‘Al Waad (عالوعد) | Wael Al-Sharqawi | Wael Al-Sharqawi | Wael Al-Sharqawi | Wael Al-Sharqawi | 2012 |
| Afa Ya Ghali (افا يا غالي) | Omar Sari | Toni Qattan | Toni Qattan | Haitham Qa‘war | 2012 |
| Law Maktoub (لو مكتوب) | Toni Qattan | Toni Qattan | Toni Qattan | Haitham Qa‘war | 2011 |
| Rouhi w Rouhak (روحي وروحك) | Wael Al-Sharqawi | Wael Al-Sharqawi | Wael Al-Sharqawi | Wael Al-Sharqawi | 2010 |
| Maghrum (مغروم) | Toni Qattan | Toni Qattan | Haitham Qa‘war | Haitham Qa‘war | 2010 |
| Ahlef Yameen (احلف يمين) | Omar Sari | Toni Qattan | Toni Qattan | Ahmad Rami | 2009 |
| Eb‘ed w Rouh (ابعد وروح) | Bilal Al-Sari | Bilal Al-Sari | Wissam Ghazawi | Hadi Sharara | 2007 |
| ‘Ayouni Sahrana (عيوني سهرانة) | Shadi Farah | Roger Abi Akl | Roger Abi Akl | Roger Abi Akl | 2006 |
| Men Donak (من دونك) | Toni Qattan | Toni Qattan | Khaled Mustafa | Khaled Mustafa | 2005 |
| ‘Awadtini (عودتني) | Bilal Al-Sari | Toni Qattan | Khaled Khawalda | Abu Laghd | 2005 |
| Bteghib ‘Alayya (بتغيب عليا) | Toni Qattan | Toni Qattan | Khaled Mustafa | Abu Laghd | 2004 |

=== Albums ===
Album "Malkesh Zay" (ملكش زي), 2008

| Song | Lyrics | Composition | Arrangement |
|---|---|---|---|
| Malkesh Zay (ملكش زي) | Omar Sari | Toni Qattan | Khaled Mustafa |
| Ma Ba’etsh Leek (ما بقتش ليك) | Toni Qattan | Toni Qattan | Khaled Khawalda |
| Fein El-Malak (فين الملاك) | Bilal Al-Sari | Toni Qattan | Khaled Khawalda |
| Beyes‘ab ‘Alayya (بيصعب عليا) | Toni Qattan | Toni Qattan | Khaled Mustafa |
| Safri (سافري) | Bilal Al-Sari | Toni Qattan | Khaled Khawalda |
| Hal-‘Omar (هالعمر) | Omar Sari | Toni Qattan | Khaled Khawalda |
| ‘Ashanak Enta (عشانك انت) | Abu Zeid Hassan | Toni Qattan | Khaled Khawalda |
| La Tzeed (لا تزيد) | Omar Sari | Toni Qattan | Khaled Mustafa |
| Awwal Dam‘a (أول دمعة) | Omar Sari | Toni Qattan | Khaled Mustafa |

=== Music Videos ===
| Song | Lyrics | Composition | Arrangement | Director | Year |
|---|---|---|---|---|---|
| Jadeer Bel Zikr (جدير بالذكر) | Ibrahim Mohammad | Rami Gamal | Toni Qattan | Abdulrahman Issa | 2023 |
| Bedna N‘alebha Aleq (بدنا نقلبها قلق) (duet with Muhannad Khalaf) | Yasser Hamad | Toni Qattan & Muhannad Khalaf | Toni Qattan | Abdul Fattah Ismail | 2022 |
| Mesh La‘eb (مش لاعب) | Ibrahim Mohammad | Toni Qattan | Toni Qattan | Abdulrahman Issa | 2021 |
| Bint Bladi (بنت بلادي) | Wael Al-Sharqawi | Wael Al-Sharqawi | Wael Al-Sharqawi | Abdulrahman Issa | 2021 |
| Hobna Dawla (حبنا دولة) | Bashar Hawamdeh | Mohammad Bashar | Khaled Mustafa | Abdulrahman Issa | 2021 |
| Nessini w Ghab (نسيني وغاب) | Ibrahim Mohammad | Toni Qattan | Toni Qattan | Abdulrahman Issa | 2021 |
| Kouni Li El-Mousiqa (كونيلي الموسيقى) | Omar Sari | Mohammad Bashar | Rami Raees | Abdulrahman Issa | 2019 |
| Hatha Qalbi (هذا قلبي) (duet with Bisan Ismail) | Mohammad Al-Jubouri | Haider Kittara | Haider Kittara | Abdulrahman Issa | 2019 |
| Mostaheel (مستحيل) | Amer Lawand | Salim Salameh | Rayn | Abdulrahman Issa | 2018 |
| Ma Baddi Hob (ما بدي حب) | Imad Issa | Omar Al-Kheir | Seif El-Din Muneer | Abdulrahman Issa | 2018 |
| Sho Ma Alou (شو ما قالوا) | Ali Khair | Ali Khair | Osama Al-Nabr | Abdulrahman Issa | 2017 |
| Ya ‘Eib El-‘Eib (يا عيب العيب) | Wael Al-Sharqawi | Wael Al-Sharqawi | Wael Al-Sharqawi | Abdulrahman Issa | 2017 |
| El-Hob El-Hob (الحب الحب) | Toni Qattan | Toni Qattan | Toni Qattan | Anas Al-Najjar | 2017 |
| Dinya Ma Teswa (دنيا ما تسوى) | Mohammad Sha‘ath | Mohammad Sha‘ath | Yousef Baltaji | Hamoudeh Saadeh | 2017 |
| Serti Halali (صرتي حلالي) | Wael Al-Sharqawi | Wael Al-Sharqawi | Wael Al-Sharqawi | Ahmad Bawzeer | 2015 |
| Afa Ya Ghali (افا يا غالي) | Omar Sari | Toni Qattan | Toni Qattan | Rouhi Lutfi | 2012 |
| Maghrum (مغروم) | Toni Qattan | Toni Qattan | Haitham Qa‘war | Marc Karam | 2010 |
| Malkesh Zay (ملكش زي) | Omar Sari | Toni Qattan | Khaled Mustafa | Jad Sawaya | 2008 |
| Eb‘ed w Rouh (ابعد وروح) | Bilal Al-Sari | Bilal Al-Sari | Wissam Ghazawi | Adeeb Al-Mufti | 2007 |
| ‘Ayouni Sahrana (عيوني سهرانة) | Shadi Farah | Roger Abi Akl | Roger Abi Akl | Hani Khachfeh | 2006 |
| Men Donak (من دونك) | Toni Qattan | Toni Qattan | Khaled Mustafa | Hani Khachfeh | 2005 |
| ‘Awadtini (عودتني) | Bilal Al-Sari | Toni Qattan | Khaled Khawalda | Bilal Al-Sari | 2005 |

=== National Songs ===
| Song | Lyrics | Composition | Arrangement | Year |
|---|---|---|---|---|
| La Ya Amman (لا يا عمان) (group) | Omar Sari | Toni Qattan | Khaled Mustafa | 2005 |
| Ahl Al-Himma (أهل الهمة) (Jordan) | Mada Fayez | Toni Qattan | Haitham Qa‘war | 2009 |
| Rah Terja‘ Falasteen (راح ترجع فلسطين) | Toni Qattan | Toni Qattan | Toni Qattan | 2009 |
| Falastini (فلسطيني) | Toni Qattan | Toni Qattan | Ahmad Rami | 2015 |
| Ya Kheirat El-Bilad (يا خيرة البلدان) | Suleiman Al-‘Assaf | Toni Qattan | Toni Qattan | 2016 |
| Falastini (فلسطيني) | Wael Al-Sharqawi | Wael Al-Sharqawi | Wael Al-Sharqawi | 2020 |
| Habbu El-Filastiniyya (هبوا الفلسطينية) | Wael Al-Sharqawi | Wael Al-Sharqawi | Wael Al-Sharqawi | 2021 |
| Talli Ya Shams (طلي يا شمس) | Omar Sari | Toni Qattan | Toni Qattan | 2022 |
| Ya ‘Eini ‘Al-Nashama (يا عيني عالنشامى) | Khaled Al-Nimri | Khaled Al-Nimri | Fadi Al-Fahmawi | 2024 |
| Ordoni wa Aftakher (أردني وأفتخر) | Khaled Al-Nimri | Khaled Al-Nimri | Fadi Al-Fahmawi | 2024 |
| Ana El-Falastini (أنا الفلسطيني) | Wael Al-Sharqawi | Wael Al-Sharqawi | Wael Al-Sharqawi | 2025 |
| Al-Nashama w Bas (النشامى وبس) | Khaled Al-Nimri | Toni Qattan | Fadi Al-Fahmawi | 2025 |

== Concerts and shows ==
The most prominent festivals in which Toni Qattan has participated:

Jerash Festival – Jordan, in 2016, 2018, 2022, 2024, and 2025.

Expo 2020 Dubai – United Arab Emirates, in 2021.

16th Palestine Festival – United Kingdom, in 2021.

Umm Qais Festival – Jordan, in 2016.

Ziryab International Festival – Malaysia, in 2007 and 2008.

Amman Summer Festival – Jordan, in 2007, 2008, 2009, 2010, 2011, 2012, 2015, 2016 and 2017.

Jordan Festival – Jordan, in 2008 and 2009.

Monte Carlo International Music Awards (Festival) – in 2007.

Palestine Summer Festival – Ramallah, Palestine, in 2007.

Oktoberfest Festival – Shefa-‘Amr, Palestine, in 2017.

Nablus Festival – Nablus, Palestine, in 2008.

Tyre Festival – Tyre, Lebanon, in 2008.

Orange Festival – Jericho, Palestine, in 2011.

Dead Sea Nights Festival – Jordan, in 2011 and 2012.

Heritage Festival in Birzeit – Palestine, in 2012.

Castle Nights Festival – Jordan, in 2012 and 2017.

He took part in the “Neutrality Day” celebration on 12 December 2015 in the Turkmen capital Ashgabat, at the official invitation of the state of Turkmenistan and in the presence of Turkmen president Gurbanguly Berdimuhamedow, along with 12 other heads of state. The event also featured a number of international stars, including the Italian legend Toto Cutugno, Russian singer Polina Gagarina, and other artists from Turkey, Georgia, and elsewhere.

He participated in the musical pageant “Ya Biladi” (O My Country) with a group of Jordanian artists, performing before King Abdullah II ibn Al-Hussein at Al-Husseiniya Palace in the Jordanian capital Amman during the celebration of the 76th Independence Day of the Kingdom on 25 May 2022.

He has also performed a large number of concerts and festivals in Lebanon, Egypt, Palestine, Jordan, Qatar, Malaysia, Turkey, Sweden, Chile, the United States, Germany, the United Kingdom, the United Arab Emirates, and other countries.

== Acting ==
Toni Qattan took part as an actor in the TV series “Al-Hob Al-Hob” (الحب الحب), playing the role of Nasser. The series was produced by Roya TV in 2017 and directed by Mohammad Al-Hashki, and starred Raja’i Qawas and Maisa Abd Elhadi. He also performed the show's theme song (opening title).

== Personal life ==
Toni Qattan is the eldest child of his parents and has a younger brother and sister. He is married to the Jordanian media personality and television presenter Dana Abu Khader. They were married on September 14, 2011, in a grand ceremony held in Amman, attended by numerous media, artistic, and diplomatic figures from Jordan. They have two children:

Gianna, born May 8, 2016.

George, born December 7, 2018.

== Health Struggles ==
=== Liver Transplant ===
Arab media sources reported in 2010 that Toni Qattan was suffering from liver cirrhosis. Doctors stated that the condition resulted from a chronic congenital disease called biliary duct sclerosis, which usually shows no symptoms until its final stages, when the patient becomes in need of a liver transplant, as there is no other treatment for this disease. The same sources also reported that Queen Rania Al Abdullah of Jordan covered the cost of Qattan's treatment at the King Hussein Medical Center in Amman. News reports confirmed that by early 2013, Qattan had been receiving treatment in Italy and was preparing for a liver transplant there. On March 10, 2014, media outlets reported that the surgeon in charge of performing the liver transplant for Qattan at the Niguarda Hospital in Milan, Italy, had postponed the surgery just minutes before it was to begin after discovering that the donor liver was not suitable for transplantation and could pose a risk to Qattan's life. The procedure was therefore postponed until a new donor could be found. Eventually, Toni Qattan successfully underwent liver transplantation at Niguarda Hospital in Milan on April 26, 2014. He recovered well and returned to his normal life and artistic career.

=== Open-Heart Surgery ===
Media outlets announced that Toni Qattan underwent open-heart surgery to replace his aortic valve on Sunday, November 27, 2022, in Amman, Jordan. His wife, Jordanian media personality Dana Abu Khader, confirmed that he was in the recovery phase in a statement she shared online.
