= El Morabba3 =

Arabic rock band

El Morabba3 المُرَبَع
- Origin: Amman, Jordan
- Genres: Post-rock; progressive rock; indietronica; psychedelic; alternative rock
- Years active: 2009–present
- Members: Muhammad Abdullah, Basel Naouri
- Past members: El Far3i; Odai Shawagfeh; Dirar Shawagfeh
- Website: elmorabba3.com

El Morabba3 (Arabic: المربّع meaning "The Square") is an Arabic rock band from Amman, Jordan, formed in 2009.

== Biography ==
The Jordan-based group was formed in 2009 as an Arab rock band. In July 2012 they released their debut album, titled El Morabba3 (The Square), afterwards they gained huge popularity across the region. In 2015 they launched a crowdfunding campaign for their newest album, Taraf Al Khait. The band's fan base throughout the Arab world and internationally has been steadily growing. In 2014, they appeared in front of thousands of fans as part of a major musical competition called SoundClash in Amman against another Jordanian band called Autostrad.

== Current members ==
- Muhammad Abdullah - Co-founder, singer songwriter and bassist
- Basel Naouri - Producer, synth and trumpet player

== Former members ==
- El Far3i - acoustic guitar and vocals
- Odai Shawagfeh - Co-founder, production, electric guitar, keyboards & synth
- Dirar Shawagfeh - Co-founder, drums, percussion

== Festivals/tours ==
- Soundclash Jordan (2014)
- El rab3 (2014)
- Al Balad Music Festival (2015)
- London Sound (2015)
- Alexandria (2015)
- Bala Feesh (2015)
- Jerash Roman Theater (2015)
- Amman New York Fusion (2016)
- Oshtoora Festival (2016)
- Music Park Festival (2017)
- Visa for Music (2017)

== Discography ==
=== Albums ===
- El Morabba3 (album) (The Square) (2012):
  1. El Morabba3 - Asheek
  2. El Morabba3 - Ma Indak Khabar
  3. El Morabba3 & El Far3i - Taht il Ard
  4. El Morabba3 - Tarweej
  5. El Morabba3 & El Far3i - Ya Zein
  6. El Morabba3 - Cigara Qabel Ma Nqoom
  7. El Morabba3 & El Far3i - Laykoon
  8. El Morabba3 - Aghanneek
  9. El Morabba3 & El Far3i - Hada Tani
- Taraf Al Khait (2016):
  1. El Morabba3 - Intro
  2. El Morabba3 - Ilham
  3. El Morabba3 - Abaad Shwaii 1
  4. El Morabba3 - El Bath El Haii
  5. El Morabba3 - Shiber Maii
  6. El Morabba3 - Biddeesh Aaraf Ana Min Wein
  7. El Morabba3 - El Mokhtalifeen
  8. El Morabba3 - 100000 Malion Meel
  9. El Morabba3 - Abaad Shwaii 2
  10. El Morabba3 - El Raai

== See also ==
- Music of Jordan
- Arabic music
