= El Far3i =

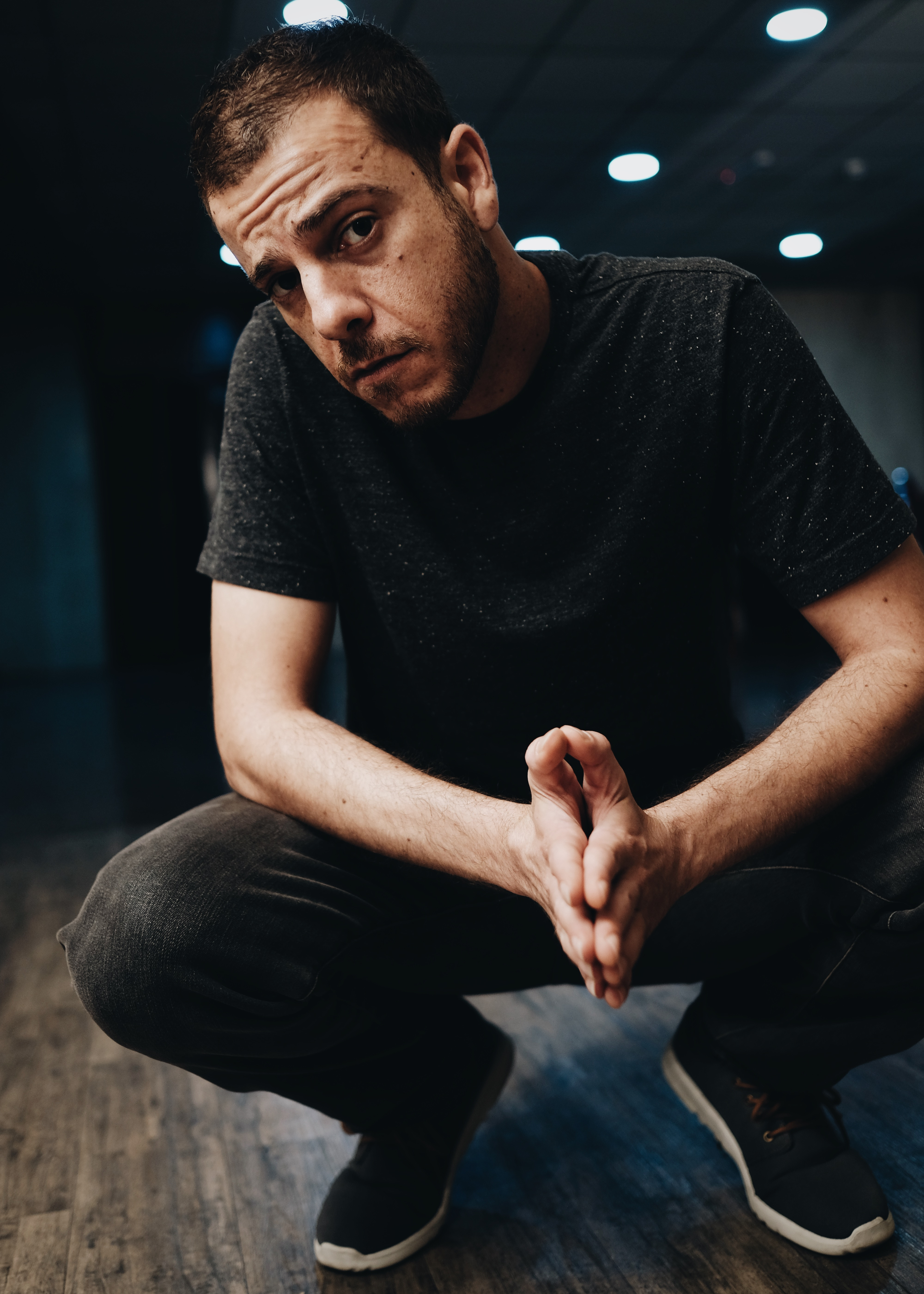

Background information
- Born: 14 August 1983
- Origin: Jordan, Palestine
- Genres: Arabic rap
- Years active: 2012–present
- Website: www.elfar3i.com

Tareq Abu Kwaik (Arabic: طارق ابو كويك), known by his stage name El Far3i (Arabic: الفرعي), is a rapper, singer, songwriter, and drummer. He is Palestinian-Jordanian, currently a member of the Shamstep band 47Soul, and was formerly a member of the Arabic rock band El Morabba3. Since 2012, he has released six solo albums.

== Biography ==
=== Solo career ===
El Far3i started his solo career in Amman, Jordan, around 2008 by performing his original acoustic and rap songs in small local venues while recording his first full-length album.

The year 2012 witnessed the release of El Far3i's first two albums, his debut acoustic record "Sout Min Khasab" and his debut in Arabic rap under the name "Far3 El Madakhel".

In 2014, he collaborated with the Jordanian producer Damar to release his second rap album (and third album in total) "Kaman Dafsheh", which was based on various samples of Arabic music.

Following the same pattern of alternating between Arabic rap and acoustic albums, El Far3i released "El Rajol El Khashabi" in 2017 as the second installment of an acoustic albums trilogy following 2012's "Sout Min Khashab" and preceding "Nas Min Khashab" which is expected to be released in 2022.

The album found great success with audiences particularly following the release of the single "Tghayarti", generally considered to be El Far3i's most famous song.

In 2021 El Far3i released the rap album "Lazim Tisa" after promoting it with a live online performance from London.

== Discography ==
Albums

- Soat Min Khashab (2012)
- Far3 El Madakhel (2012)
- Kaman Dafsheh (2014)
- El Rajol El Khashabi (2017)
- Lazim Tisa (2021)
- Nas Min Khashab (2022)

EP’s

- Far3 El Madakhil EP (2019)
- Mayadeenik EP (2022)
- Abu El Dahab EP (2023)
