= Shamstep =

Music genre

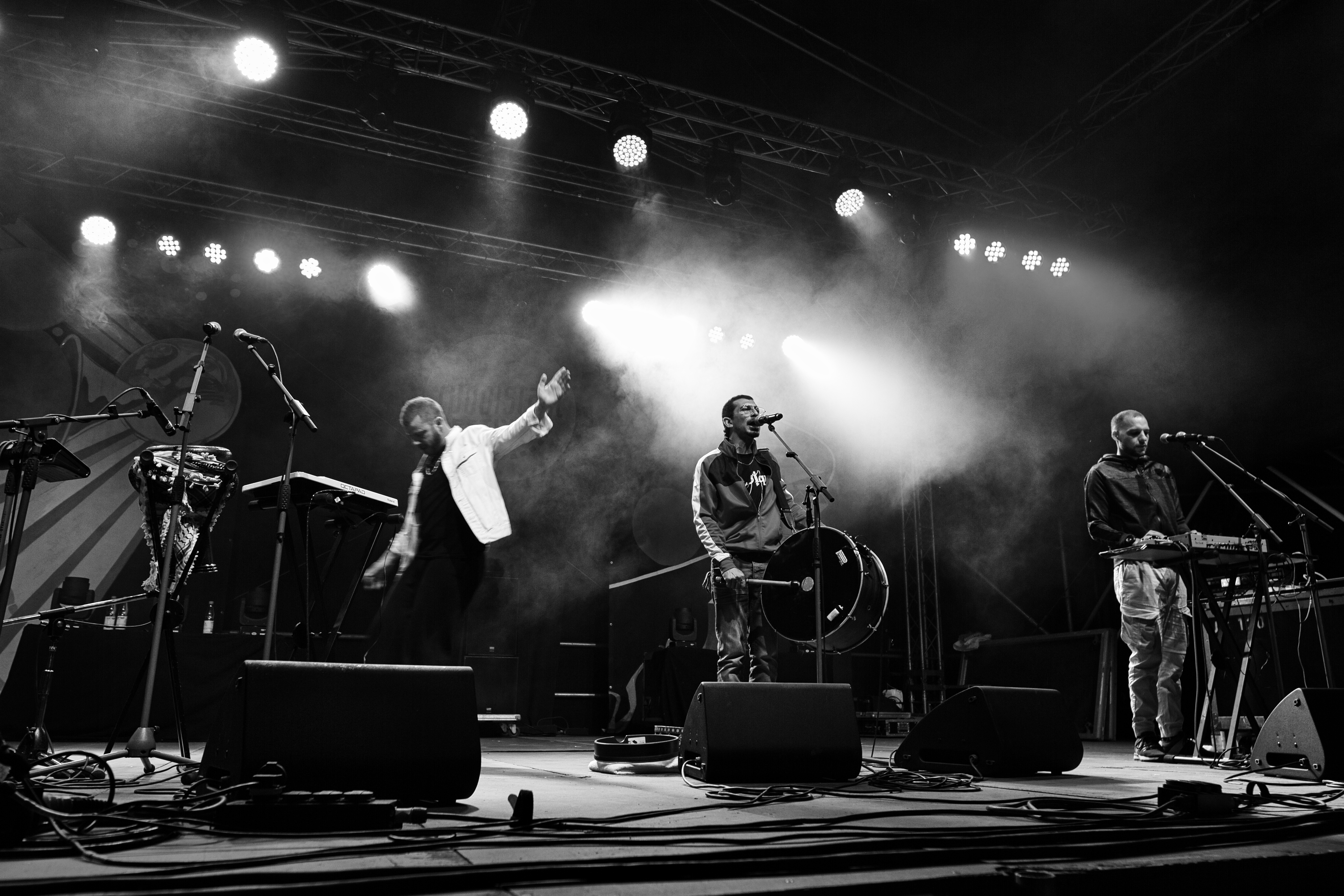
47Soul at Rudolstadt-Festival (2022)

Shamstep is a Levantine genre of electronic dance music that combines the traditional forms of Dabke music with electronic instruments. 'Sham' is the Arabic name for the region of Greater Syria, Syria-Palestine or the Levant. The term 'Shamstep' was coined by the Jordanian-Palestinian band 47Soul to describe their music.

Shamstep has been described as 'more than just a byword for hipsterfied east–west fusion. In 47Soul's home region, it's becoming part of the soundtrack for Arab youth.' The band has stated that it believes the region of Sham is "too divided with borders... In 1947, it was accessible to travel between our little cities...[but] we still see [the region] as a whole." 47 Soul's music is also defined by its fusion with Afro-American styles of music like Hip Hop and Reggae, due to some similarities between Arabic and African music .

Other musicians who play similar forms of Dabke using electronic instruments include Omar Souleyman, and Egyptian groups like Islam Chipsy, whose music is seen as part of the Egyptian new wave called Shaabi or Electro Shaabi. The website Rhythmpassport.com groups all these forms under the heading 'electro Dabke'.

AlAraby has described 47 Soul's music as a "reinterpretation of traditional Arabic instruments, modal scales and rhythms found in chobi and mijwiz wedding music - and paralleled in the Egyptian electro-shaabi scene".
