= Hayajan =

Arabic musical band

- Origin: Jordan; Iran
- Genres: Rock, Pop
- Years active: 2013–present
- Members: Alaa Wardi (lead vocals, keyboards); Odai Shawagfeh (electric guitar); Mohammed Idrei (electric guitar); Amjad Shahrour (bass); Hakam Abu Soud (drums)
- Website: www.hayajanband.com

Hayajan (هيجان) is an Arabic independent rock and pop band formed in 2011. The group launched their first album Ya Bay in May 2013, and their second album Khusouf Al-Ard in 2019.

== Band members ==
- Alaa Wardi – lead vocals, keyboards
- Odai Shawagfeh – electric guitar
- Mohammed Idrei – electric guitar
- Amjad Shahrour – bass
- Hakam Abu Soud – drums

== Discography ==
Album name	Release date	Tracks
Ya Bay	May 2013	1. "Ya 7weneh" (4:11); 2. "Wel Loom Ramani" (4:29); 3. "Safina" (3:28); 4. "Fish Majal" (5:36); 5. "Ween El-Kalam" (4:16); 6. "Risala" (3:14); 7. "Ween Min eSneen" (4:57); 8. "Wyama" (4:17); 9. "Nude" (Radiohead Cover) (6:31); 10. "Comfortably Numb" (Pink Floyd cover) (6:31)
Khusouf Al-Ard	January 2019	1. Yalla Bina; 2. Ardon Wahed; 3. Zubalah; 4. Insan; 5. El-Hob Mawjoud; 6. Jibna Al-Eid; 7. Mashakel; 8. Al-Ghabah; 9. Kbirna; 10. Dinya Mosh Aminah
