= Tannoura Maxi =

2012 film directed by Joe Bou Eid

Tannoura Maxi - Taking Away the Community's Virginity - is a Lebanese movie, directed by Joe Bou Eid. The film premiered at the 2011 Dubai International Film Festival. It has been released on May 3, 2012. The movie participated in more than 20 international film festival, and won 11 awards.

== Starring ==
- Joy Karam
- Chady El Tineh
- Carole Abboud
- Tamara Abou Jaoudeh
- Siham Haddad
- Antoine Balabane
- Joseph Sessin
- Nawal Kamel
- Dory Moukarzel
- Sarah Haidar
- Daniel Balaban
- Diamand Bou Abboud
- Andree Nakkouzi
- Rita Choueiri
