= Omar Al-Abdallat =

Jordanian singer-songwriter (born 1972)

Omar Al-Abdallat عمر العبداللات
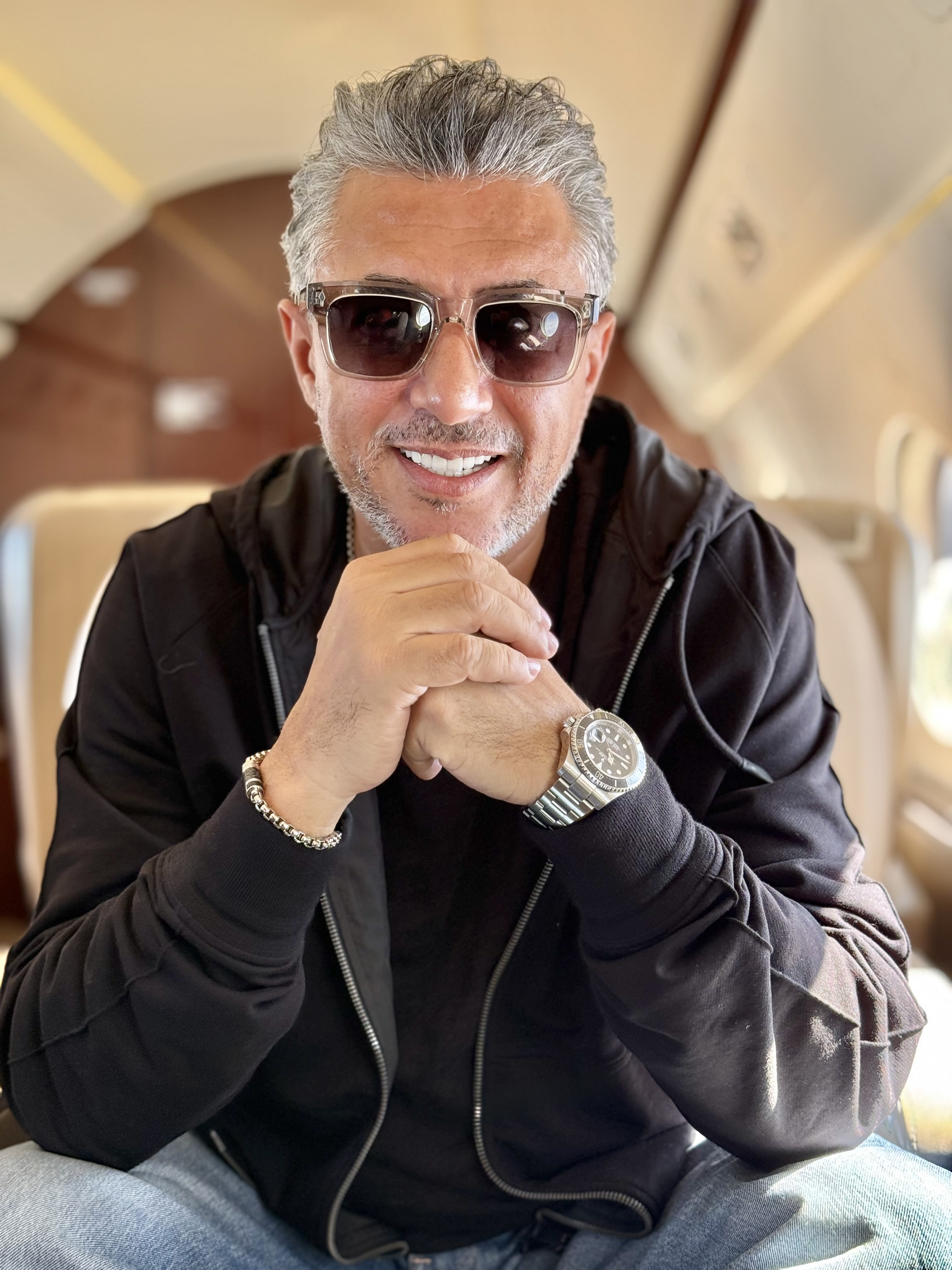

Background information
- Born: 15 October 1972 (age 54); Al-Salt, Jordan
- Genre: Arabic music
- Occupations: Singer, actor
- Instruments: Vocals, oud
- Years active: 1988–present
- Label: Rotana Records

Omar Al-Abdallat (Arabic: عمر العبداللات, romanized: ʿUmar al-ʿAbdallāt; born 15 October 1972) is a Jordanian singer-songwriter credited with popularizing Bedouin music. He has produced and/or performed a number of patriotic Jordan standards, including "Hashimi, Hashimi" and "Jeishana", and traditional Jordanian songs. He represented his country in events throughout the world and is popular in some cities of other Arab countries. In 2019, he entered the Order of Culture, Science and Arts at the "level of brilliance".
