= Amr Diab discography =

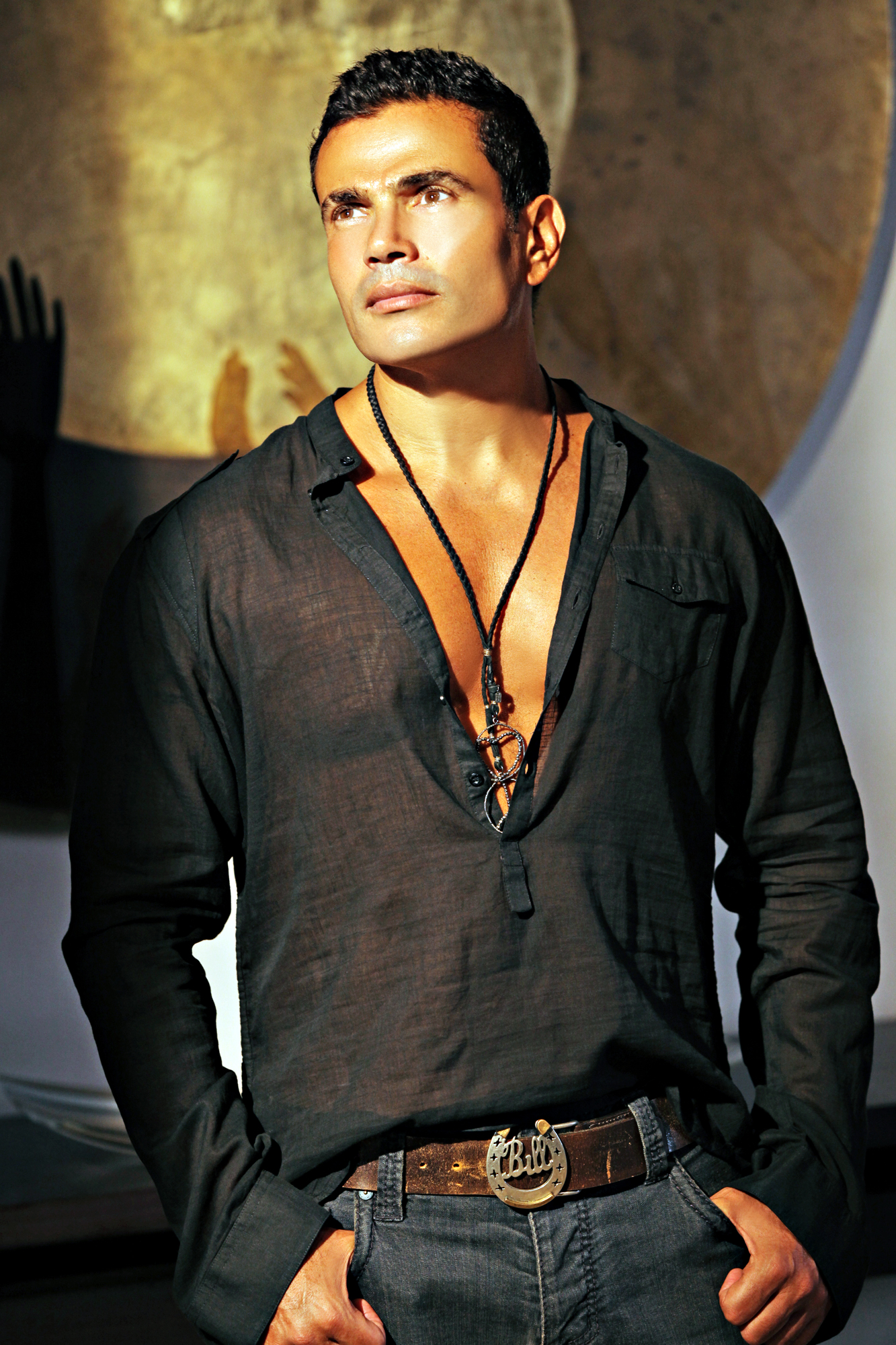
- Amr Diab while shooting his music video "Ba'dem Alby" in 2009
- Studio albums: 33
- Singles: 74
- Music videos: 40

Amr Diab, Arash Mohseni in an audio cover (2020)

The discography of Amr Diab, an Egyptian popular pop, dance, folk dance singer, consists of 33 studio albums of which several have been well received by critics and fans from AllMusic. He was born on the October 11, 1961 in Portsaid, Egypt. He began singing at age three and at six, he performed the Egyptian national anthem at the July 23rd Festival in Portsaid. He was awarded a guitar by the governor for his performance and his career course was set. After that he was discovered by the great Emad Badawy when he was only 7, he has 74 singles, and 41 music videos. He's recognized as one of the most famous Egyptian singers worldwide holding the Guinness world record for Most World Music Awards for Best Selling Middle Eastern Artist with four. Some of his albums and songs have entered different charts on Billboard.

== Albums ==
=== 1983–1998: Delta Sound Records ===
Year	Original Title	Translation	Producer	Main Tracks
1983	Ya Tareeq	O Road		
1984	Ghanny Men Albak	Sing From Your Heart	Tarek Madkour; Fathi Salama; Mohamed Helal	Ghanni Min Albak; Ashof Ainaik
1986	Hala Hala	Welcome Welcome	Mohamed Helal; Ibrahim El Radio	Hala Hala
1987	Khalseen	We're Done	Fathi Salama	Khalseen
1988	Mayal	Leaning	Hamid Al Shaeri; Fathi Salama; Tarek Madkour	Mayal Toubah Na'sha'il Amar
1989	Shawa'na	We Miss	Hamid Al Shaeri; Fathi Salama	Shawa'na; Enty Elly Arfa
1990	Matkhafesh	Don't Be Afraid	Hamid Al Shaeri	Matkhafesh; W Nendam
1991	Habibi	Baby	Hossam Hosni	Habibi Aieh Bas Elly Ramak
1992	Ayamna	Our Days	Hamid Al Shaeri	Ayamna; El Mady
1993	Ya Omrena	O Our Life	Tarek Madkour	Kan Andak Haq; Eyoun Habibi
1994	We Yloumouni	Let Them Blame Me	Hamid Al Shaeri	Ahlef Belayaly; Matfakarnish
1995	Ragein	We're Coming Back	Tarek Madkour Yasser Abdel Rahman; Ashraf Mahrous	Ragein; Ma Yethekish Alieha
1998	Awedony	Made Me Used To You	Hamid Al Shaeri	Awedony; Kol El Kalam; Weghalawtec

=== 1996–2003: Alam El Phan Records ===
Year	Original Title	Translation	Producer	Main Tracks
1996	Nour El Ain	Light of the Eye	Hamid Al Shaeri	Nour El Ain; Nafs El Makan
1999	Amarain	Two Moons	jana Basyouni Hamid Al Shaeri; Farid Awamer	Amarain; Alby – with Khaled; Ana; Bahibak Aktar
2000	Tamally Maak	Always With You	Tarek Madkour	Tamally Maak; El Alem Allah; Alby Ekhtarak; W Heya Amla Eh
2001	Aktar Wahed	The Most One	Tarek Madkour	Aktar Wahed; Wala Ala Balo; Kan Tayeb; Baed Al Layaly
2003	Allem Alby	Teach My Heart	Fahd; Hany Yacoub; Amr Shaker	Allem Alby; Ana Ayesh; Khalleeni Ganbak

=== 2004–2014: Rotana Records ===
Year	Original Title	Translation	Producer	Main Tracks
2004	Leily Nahary	My Night and Day	Nader Hamdy; Tarek Tawakoul	Lealy Nahary Qusad Einy
2005	Kammel Kalamak	Keep Talking	Tarek Madkour; – Adel Hakki – Fahd	Kammel Kalamak; We Maloh
2007	El Lilady	Tonight	Hassan El Shafei; Fahd	El Lilady Khalik Ma'aya
2009	Wayah	With Her	Hassan El Shafei	Wayah Yehemak Fe Eih Allah Ala Hobak
2011	Banadeek Taala	Come I'm Calling You	Adel Hakki	Banadeek Taala; Ma'drrsh Ana
2013	El Leila	This Night	Adel Hakki; Osama Elhendy	El Leila; Sebt Faragh Kibeer Khalina Lewahdina
2014	Shoft El Ayam	I Saw the Days	Adel Hakki; Osama Elhendy	Shoft El Ayam; Gamalo; Ana Mosh Anany

=== Since 2016: Nay For Media ===
Year	Original Title	Translation	Producer	Main Tracks
2016	Ahla W Ahla	Sweeter and Sweeter	Osama Elhendy; Adel Hakki	Aks Baad; Ragea; Ana W Enta Ala Hobak
2017	Meaddy El Nas	Greater than Other People	Osama Elhendy	Meaddy El Nas; Ya Agmal Oyoun; Naghmet El Herman
2018	Kol Hayaty	All My Life	Osama Elhendy; Nader Hamdy; Tarek Madkour; Nadem Elshaeri; Marshmello	Kol Hayaty Yetalemo; Hadded; Da Law Etsab
2020	Sahran	Up All Night	Tarek Madkour; Nader Hamdy; Osama Elhendy; Ramy Samir	Makanak Fe Alby; Hayeish Yeftekerni; Zay Manty Youm Talat Odam Merayetha
2020	Ya Ana Ya La	Either Me or No One	Adel Hakki; Ramy Samir; Ahmed Adel; Wesam Abdel Munem; Nader Hamdy; Tooma	Ya Ana Ya La; Mahsoud; El Gaw Gameel
2023	Makanak	Your Place	Ahmed Ibrahim; Wesam Abdel Munem; Osama Elhendy; Adel Hakki; Sherif Fahmy	Makanak; Ma'arfsh Had Belesm Da; Ya Amar; Mabetghebsh

=== Since 2025: Sony Music Middle East ===
Year	Original Title	Translation	Producer	Main Tracks
2025	Ebtadena	We Started	Osama Elhendy; Ahmed Ibrahim; -Adel Hakki: Sherif Fahmy; Tooma; Wesam Abdel Munem	Khatfoony; Baba; Ebtadena; Malish Badeel; Mate’laash

=== Other studio albums ===
Year	Original Title	Translation	Producer	Label	Main Tracks
1983	Ya Tareeq – First Album of Amr Diab	Oh Road	Aziz Al Nasser	Sawt Al Madina	Ya Tareeq
1987	Assif	Sorry	Sayid Ismail	Randaphone	Assif
1992	Ice Cream Fi Glym – Soundtrack From Khairy Beshara's Motion Picture	Ice Cream in Glym	Hossam Hosni	Delta Sound	Ice Cream in Glym; Wehna Maak
2016	Mn Asmaa Allah Al Hosna – Religious album	From The Names of God	Osama Elhendy; Hamid El Shaeri	Nay for Media	

== Singles ==
Year	Original Title	Producer	Label
1999	Eleos – with Angela Dimitriou	George Theofanous	EMI
1999	Ana Mahma Kibirt	Hamid El Shaeri	Alam El Phan
2000	El Quds De Aredna	Tarek Madkour	Rotana
2000	El Helm Da Helmena	Tarek Madkour	Rotana
2002	Bahebak Nefsi Aaolhalak	Fahd	Alam El Phan
2003	Rouh Alby	Nader Hamdy	Alam El Phan
2005	Elly Beiny We Beinak	Fahd	Rotana
2007	Allah Aliha	Fahd	Rotana
2008	Oldies Singles	Fahd: Hany Yacoub; Nader Hamdy; Tarek Tawakoul	Rotana
2009	Leh Youm Ma Abeltak	Hassan El Shafei	Rotana
2009	Makontsh Nawy	Hassan El Shafei	Rotana
2010	Nokia 5800 Releases	Hassan El Shafei Fahd	Rotana
2010	Aslaha Betefre’a	Adel Hakki	Rotana
2011	Masr Alet "Egypt Said"	Adel Hakki	Nay for Media
2011	La' Yestaheil	Adel Hakki	Rotana
2012	Fe Haga Feek	Adel Hakki	Rotana
2012	We Redet	Adel Hakki	Rotana
2012	Ayesh Maak	Osama Elhendy	Rotana
2013	Dawam El Haal	Osama Elhendy	Rotana
2014	Mesh Kol Wahed	Osama Elhendy	Rotana
2014	Ya Hob Dawebna	Adel Hakki	Rotana
2015	Balash Teb'ed	Sherif Mekkawy	Nay for Media
2016	Al Qahera – ft. Mohamed Mounir	Osama Elhendy	Nay for Media
2017	El Farha El Leila	Osama Elhendy	Nay for Media
2018	Bahebak Ana	Osama Elhendy	Nay for Media
2019	Maa'darsh Al Nesyan	Mohamed Hamdy	Nay for Media
2019	Gamaa Habybak	Osama Elhendy	Nay for Media
2019	Africa (2019 Edition)	Osama Elhendy	Nay for Media
2019	Aha Gheir	Osama Elhendy; Tarek Madkour; Ramy Samir	Nay for Media
2020	Ya Baladna Ya Helwa	Tarek Madkour	Nay for Media
2020	Amaken El Sahar: Including: Ahe Ahe ft. Eirini Papadopoulou	Osama Elhendy Adel Hakki Salvatore Ganaci Nabchodonsaur Poly	Nay for Media
2021	Inta El Haz	Ahemd Ibrahim; Adel Hakki; Wesam Abdel Munem; Tarek Madkour; Nader Hamdy; Tooma	Nay for Media
2022	El Ser	Wesam Abdel Munem; Adel Hakki; Ahmed Ibrahim; Ramy Samir; Mohamed Hamdy; Tooma	Nay for Media
2023	Shokran Min Hena Le Bokra	Osama Elhendy; Ahemd Ibrahim; Wesam Abdel Munem; Adel Hakki; Mohamed Kammah; Jalal El Hamdaoui	Nay for Media

== Compilations ==
Year	Original title	Label
1994	Zekrayat	Delta Sound
1998	Habibe (The Remix Album)	EMI
1999	The Best Of Amr Diab – 1999 Edition	EMI
2001	The Best Of Amr Diab – 2001 Edition	EMI
2002	Rewind (Remix Album)	Delta Sound
2004	Greatest Hits 1986–1995	EMI
2005	Greatest Hits 1996–2003	EMI
2013	Greatest Hits: (2004–2013)	Rotana
2016	Ahla Ma Ghana Amr Diab	Rotana
2016	Ahla W Ahla (Summer Edition)	Nay for Media
2019	Remixes Feat. R3HAB	Nay for Media

== Charted songs ==
Title	Year	Peak chart position	Album
Title	Year	MENA	Album
"El Hafla"	2023	12	Non-album single

== Music videos ==
Year	Song	Album	Director
2025	"Khatafoony"(featuring Jana Diab)	Ebtadena	Tarik Elaryan
2021	"El Donia Betoro's"		Tarik Elaryan
2020	"Amaken El Sahar"		Ahmed Al Naggar
2020	"Ya Baladna Ya Helwa"		Tarik Elaryan
2017	"Maak Alby"	Ahla W Ahla	Hadi El Bagoury
2016	"Al Qahira" (featuring Mohamed Mounir)		Sherif Sabry
2014	"Gamalo"	Shoft El Ayam	Moneer Barakat
2013	"Al Leila"	Al Leila	Michael Bernard
2011	"Banadeek Taala"	Banadeek Taala	Jac Mulder
2009	"Ba'dem Alby"	Wayah	Inspired By : Amr Diab
2009	"Wayah"	Wayah	Cameron Casey
2007	"Ne'oul Eh"	El Lilady	Marwan Hamed
2005	"We Malo"	Kammel Kalamak	Inspired By : Amr Diab
2004	"Lealy Nahary"	Lealy Nahary	Cameron Casey
2003	"Ana Ayesh"	Allem Alby	Stuart Gosling
2001	"Wala Ala Balo"	Aktar Wahed	Sherif Sabry
2000	"Tamally Maak"	Tamally Maak	Sherif Sabry
2000	"El Allem Allah"	Tamally Maak	Sherif Sabry
2000	"El Kods De Ardna"		Sherif Sabry
1999	"Amarain"	Amarain	Sherif Sabry
1998	"Awedouny"	Awedouny	Tarik Elaryan
1996	"Nour El Ain"	Nour El Ain	Tarik Elaryan
1995	"Ragein"	Ragein	Tarik Elaryan
1994	"We Yloumouni"	We Yloumouni	Tarek Nour
1993	"Kan Andek Hak"	Ya Omrena	Tarek Elkashef
1993	"Dehket Oyoun Habiby"	Ya Omrena	Ashraf Sheha
1993	"Ya Omrena"	Ya Omrena	Tarek Elkashef
1992	"El Mady"	Ayamna	Ashraf Sheha
1992	"Ice Cream in Glym"	Ice Cream in Glym	Khairy Beshara
1992	"Wehna Maak"	Ice Cream in Glym	Khairy Beshara
1991	"Habibi"	Habibi	Mohsen Ahmed
1990	"Matkhafesh"	Matkhafesh	Ashraf Sheha
1990	"Mayal"	Mayal	Adel Makin
1990	"Awel Ma'oul"	Mayal	
1987	"Khalseen"	Khalseen	
1986	"Malo"	Hala Hala	
1986	"Hala Hala"	Hala Hala	
1986	"Rahel"	Hala Hala	
1984	"Ghanni Min Albak"	Ghanni Min Albak	Youssef Haji
1984	"Betghanni Lmeen"	Ghanni Min Albak	
1983	"El Zaman"	Ya Tareeq	
