= Amarain =

1999 studio album by Amr Diab

Studio album by Amr Diab
- Released: 28 July 1999
- Studios: M. Sound (Cairo, Egypt); Plus XXX (Paris, France); Cargo (Montreuil, France); Artistic Palace (Paris, France); Libra (Athens, Greece)
- Length: 33:13
- Language: Arabic (Note: Except track 4 partly composed of Greek lyrics.)
- Labels: Alam El Phan; EMI Arabia
- Producers: Tarek Madkour; Hamid Al Shaeri; Farid Awamer

Amr Diab chronology
Awedony (1998)	Amarain (1999)	Tamally Maak (2000)

Amarain or Amarein (Egyptian Arabic: قمرين, romanized: Amarēn, lit. 'Two Moons', IPA: [ʔɑmɑˈreːn]) is a 1999 album by Amr Diab that contains his international hit "Amarain" of the same name.

The album also contains two international cooperations of Diab, one with the famous raï musician Khaled in "Alby" (Arabic: قلبي) and the second with Angela Dimitriou in the bilingual Arabic/Greek "Bahibak Aktar" (Arabic: بحبك أكتر).

== Track listing ==
The unofficial italicised English titles listed below are the closest and most accurate translations of the original titles.

Amarain track listing
No.	Title	Lyrics	Music	Length
1.	"Amarain" (قمرين Two Moons)	Mohamed Refai	Sherif Tag	4:26
2.	"Ana" (أنا I Am)	Abdel Moneim Taha	Amr Mahmoud	4:55
3.	"Alby" (قلبي My Heart; with Khaled)	Magdy El Naggar	Tag; Khaled	4:23
4.	"Bahibak Aktar" (بحبك أكتر I Love You More Σ' αγαπώ πιο πολύ; with Angela Dimitriou)	Refai; Panos Falaras	Tag	3:36
5.	"Betwhashny" (بتوحشني I Miss You)	Adel Omar	Ibrahim Fahmy	3:49
6.	"We Lesa Bethebo" (ولسه بتحبه So You Still Love Him?)	Ayman Bahgat Amar	Walid Saad	4:41
7.	"Khalik Fakerny" (خليك فاكرني Always Remember Me)	Omar	Amr Mostafa	3:27
8.	"Hekayati" (حكاياتي My Stories)	Amar	Amr Diab	3:56
Total length:				33:13

== Personnel ==
Credits adapted from the album's liner notes.

Studios

- All tracks were recorded at M. Sound Studios (Cairo)
- Parts of tracks 1 and 2 were recorded at Studio Plus XXX (Paris)
- Parts of track 3 were recorded and mixed at Studio Cargo and Artistic Palace Studios
- Parts of track 4 were recorded at Libra Studio (Greece)

Musicians

- Amr Diab – primary artist
- Tarek Hamouda – guitar solo (track 1)
- Antoine Abardonado – guitar solo (track 1)
- Gerard Ferrer – guitar (track 1)
- Ahmed Ragab – bass guitar (tracks 1, 7)
- Tarek Madkour – piano (track 1)
- Orlando Poleo – percussion (track 1)
- Ayman El Hanbouli – cello (track 1)
- Yves Le Carboulec – trumpet (track 2)
- Pino Fares – guitar (tracks 2, 7), guitar solo (track 8)
- Hussein Saber – oud (tracks 2, 3, 6)
- Khaled – guest artist (track 3)
- Reda Bedair – nay (track 3)
- Maged Sorour – qanun (track 3)
- Angela Dimitriou – guest artist (track 4)
- Yannis Bithikotsis – bouzouki (track 4)
- Yehia El Mougy – violin (track 4)
- Ahmed El Ayadi – percussion (track 4)
- Farouk Mohamed Hassan – accordion (track 5)
- Ibrahim Fathy – kawala (track 5)
- Said El Artist – percussion (tracks 5, 6, 8)
- Hisham El Araby – riq (tracks 5, 6, 8)
- Raafat Misso – saxophone (track 6)
- Nabil Bergas – nay (track 6)
- Mohamed Mabrouk – guitar (track 8)

Technical

- Tarek Madkour – arrangement (tracks 1, 2, 4, 7, 8), digital mastering
- Hamid Al Shaeri – arrangement (tracks 5, 6)
- Farid Awamer – arrangement (track 3)
- Yehia El Mougy – string arrangement (tracks 1, 3, 7)
- Amir Mahrous – engineering (tracks 1–4, 7, 8), mixing (tracks 1, 2, 4, 7, 8)
- Ahmed Gouda – engineering, mixing (tracks 5, 6)
- Jean Lamoot – engineering, mixing (track 3)
- Pascal Garnon – engineering (tracks 1, 2)
- Tolis Ketselidis – engineering (track 4)

Artwork

- Khaled Roshdy – poster, cover design
- Thierry Gicquel – inside photos
- Ahmed Mokhtar – poster, cover
