= Ahmed Mounib =

Egyptian musician

The Enchanter of the South Ahmed Mounib أحمد منيب
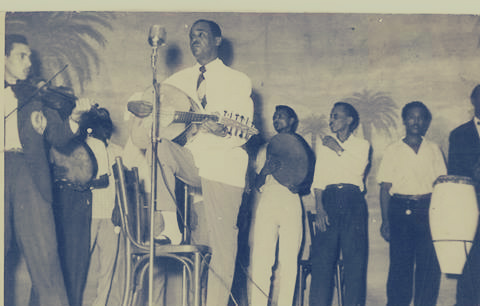

Background information
- Born: January 4, 1926; Thomas Afia
- Origin: Egypt
- Died: February 27, 1990 (aged 64)
- Occupation: Composer

Ahmed Mounib (Arabic: أحمد منيب; born 4 January 1926 – 27 February 1990) was an Egyptian Nubian, singer, composer, and oud player. He is regarded as one of the pioneers of Nubian music, he was also a mentor to the Egyptian singer Mohamed Mounir. Mounib was nicknamed "The Enchanter of the South" and was active from the 1950s until his death.

== Early life ==
Ahmed Mounib was born In Thomas Afia, a small village in Old Nubia in January 4 1926. Life was simple, with no radio or electricity, Mounib grew up on Nubian weddings as a form of entertainment, and a source of his inspiration. He started learning the oud at a young age, becoming one of the earliest artists to adopt the instrument in Nubia.

The first displacement caused by the Aswan dam occurred when Mounib was only 12 years old. And then the second one which finally displaced him happened when he was 18 years old, Mounib was displaced to Esna, which he sang about in his song 'Kan Mashe Ala Shat El Nil.' He later moved to Alexandria and finally Cairo. This change in environment influenced his music. Mounib married young and worked at an Iron and steel company.

== Music career ==
Mounib's public career began after the 1952 July Revolution, when cultural ties between southern Egypt and Sudan attracted increased official attention. In 1954, Egyptian radio established Nile Valley Radio to strengthen links with southern Egypt and Sudan. Mounib and a poet colleague appealed directly to President Gamal Abdel Nasser to allow Nubian music airtime. The resulting programme From the Inspiration of the South (Arabic: من وحي الجنوب) featured songs in the Nubian language performed by Abd al Fattah Wali, with instrumental accompaniment and arrangements by Ahmed Mounib. This brought Nubian music to a wider Egyptian audience.

Although Mounib succeeded in bringing Nubian language and music to Egyptian radio, Egyptian music at the time was mostly dominated by figures such as Umm Kulthum and Mohammed Abdel Wahab. For several years, his work remained mostly confined to Nubian weddings and celebrations in Cairo and Alexandria.

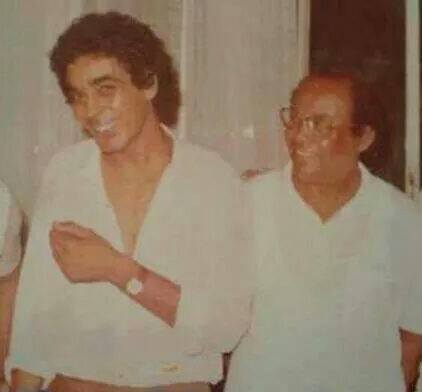
Ahmed Mounib and Mohamed Mounir

By the late 1970s, Mounib formed a creative partnership with poet Abdelrahim Mansour and the young singer Mohamed Mounir. This collaboration was largely successful, as it launched Ahmed's Mounib's career in Cairo. It also played a key role in launching Mohamed Mounir's career. Mounib launched his first album Mushtaqeen at the age of 59, after the success of the album, he produced three more albums all of which were also successful.

== Compositions and songs ==
Mounib composed approximately 85 songs over the course of his career. He recorded 51 of his own compositions across seven albums and wrote dozens of songs for other performers. He composed 45 songs for Mohamed Mounir across the singer's first ten albums. His works have been performed by a wide range of artists from across the Arab world, Libyan singer Hameed al Shaeri, and Egyptian artists such as Amr Diab, Ehab Tawfik, Mohamed Fouad, Hanan, and Hisham Abbas.

=== Popular songs ===
- Mushtaqeen (مشتاقين)
- Ya 'Ashra (يا عشرة)
- Kan wa Kan (كان وكان)
- Bilad al-Dahab (بلاد الدهب)
- Rah Aghanny (راح أغني)
- Qisma wa Nasib (قسمة ونصيب)
- Hadouta Masriya (حدوتة مصرية)

Mounib was also the main composer behind many of Mohamed Mounir's early songs, including Umm al-Dafayer, Atkallemi, Iftaḥ Qalbik, Al-Rizq 'ala Allah, Al-Layla Ya Samra, Shagar al-Laymun and Ba'tatib 'Alayki.

== Death ==
Ahmed Mounib died on 27 February 1990 at the age of 64.

== Mounib Band ==
In 2010, Khaled Ahmed Mounib, the composer's son, founded the ensemble Mounib Band to perform Nubian repertoire as well as the works of Ahmed Mounib.
