= Awedony =

1998 studio album by Amr Diab

Studio album by Amr Diab
- Released: 1998
- Studios: M. Sound (Cairo, Egypt)
- Length: 36:39
- Language: Egyptian Arabic
- Labels: Delta Sound; Alam El Phan; EMI Arabia
- Producer: Hamid Al Shaeri

Amr Diab chronology
Nour El Ain (1996)	Awedony (1998)	Amarain (1999)

Awedony or Awwendouni (Egyptian Arabic: عَوِّدوني, romanized: ʻAwwidūnī, lit. 'They Got Me Used To', IPA: [ʕaw.we.ˈdoːni]) is a 1998 album by Amr Diab that contains his international hit "Awedony" of the same name.

== Track listing ==
The unofficial italicised English titles listed below are the closest and most accurate translations of the original titles.

Awedony track listing
No.	Title	Lyrics	Music	Length
1.	"Awedony" (عودوني They Got Me Used To)	Abdel Moneim Taha	Amr Tantawy	5:20
2.	"Khalast Feek Kol El Kalam" (خلصت فيك كل الكلام I've Run Out of Words About You)	Taha	Tantawy	5:00
3.	"El Malak El Bare'" (الملاك البريء The Innocent Angel)	Mostafa Kamel	Saleh Abu El Dahab	3:53
4.	"Enta Yalli Bahebak" (إنتَ ياللي بحبك You, the One I Love)	Adel Omar	Ibrahim Fahmy	5:23
5.	"Nari (Ya Habiba)" (ناري [يا حبيبة] My Fire [O Lover])	Ahmed Sheta	Hassan Donia	4:47
6.	"Layali El Omr" (ليالي العمر The Nights of a Lifetime)	Magdy El Naggar	Amr Diab	5:12
7.	"We-Ghalawtek" (وغلاوتك By Your Preciousness)	Mohamed Refai	Mohamed Rahim	3:30
8.	"Melk Edeik" (مِلْك إيديك Owned by Your Hands)	Medhat El Adl	Riad El Hamshari	3:34
Total length:				36:39

== Personnel ==
Credits adapted from the album's liner notes.

Studios

- Recorded and mixed at M. Sound Studios

Musicians

- Amr Diab
- Yehia El Mougy
- Farouk Mohamed Hassan
- Maged Sorour
- Amr Tantawy
- Ibrahim Fathy
- Said El Artist
- Raafat Misso
- Hisham El Araby
- Hussein Saber

Technical

- Hamid Al Shaeri – arrangement
- Yehia El Mougy – string arrangement (tracks 1, 6)
- Mohamed Arram – string arrangement (track 4)
- Ahmed Gouda – engineering
- Tarek Madkour – digital mastering

Artwork

- Mohamed Gabr – cover photography
- Osama Nadir – cover design
- Shaher Wahba – production
