= Allem Alby =

2003 studio album by Amr Diab

Studio album by Amr Diab
- Released: 2003
- Studios: Leila (Giza, Egypt); ART (Giza, Egypt); Sout El Hob (Giza, Egypt); Cornet (Giza, Egypt); M. Sound (Cairo, Egypt)
- Length: 51:12
- Language: Egyptian Arabic
- Labels: Alam El Phan; Mazzika
- Producers: Fahad; Hany Yacoub; Amr Shaker

Amr Diab chronology
Aktar Wahed (2001)	Allem Alby (2003)	Leily Nahary (2004)

Allem Alby (Egyptian Arabic: عَلِّم قلبي, romanized: ʻAllim Albī, lit. 'Teach My Heart', IPA: [ˈʕællem ˈʔælbi]) is a studio album by Amr Diab, and was released on 4 February 2003. It contains 13 tracks, including the hit of the album "Ana Ayesh."

== Commercial performance ==
Allem Alby album sales reached over 750,000 copies. Although the album did not reach the number of sales of Diab's previous album Aktar Wahed, it left an imprint in Arabic music for its musical arrangements and melodies. The album contains a variety of musical genres, including hip-hop, R&B, pop and rock.

== Singles ==
"Ana Ayesh" which was track number 2 was chosen to be the lead single for the album. The music video for the single was directed by Stuart Gosling. It was aired with the release of the Alam El Phan new Channel Mazzika.

== Track listing ==
The unofficial italicised English titles listed below are the closest and most accurate translations of the original titles.

Allem Alby track listing
No.	Title	Lyrics	Music	Length
1.	"Allem Alby" (علم قلبي Teach My Heart)	Walid Galal	Khaled Ezz; Amr Diab	3:33
2.	"Ana Ayesh" (أنا عايش I'm Alive)	Rabea El Seufy	Amr Mostafa; Diab	3:47
3.	"Ally El Wada'" (قالّي الوداع He Told Me Goodbye)	Bahaa El Din Mohamed	Ezz	3:14
4.	"Ya Kinzy" (يا كنزي O My Treasure)	Mohamed Refai	Rachida El Haris	3:34
5.	"Te'dar Tetkallem" (تقدر تتكلم You Can Talk)	Refai	Refai	4:54
6.	"Law Ash'any" (لو عشقاني If You Adore Me)	Mohamed	Mohamed Rahim	4:23
7.	"Khalleeny Ganbak" (خليني جنبك Let Me Be by Your Side)	instrumental	Nader Nour; Diab	2:14
8.	"Allemny Hawak" (علمني هواك Your Love Taught Me)	Reda Amin	Sherif Tag	3:21
9.	"Habiby Ya Omry" (حبيبي يا عمري My Love, O My Life)	Mohamed	Ezz	5:03
10.	"Enta Ma Oltesh Leh" (إنتَ ما قُلتِش ليه Why Didn't You Say So?)	Mohamed	Diab	3:38
11.	"Hanneit" (حنيت I Yearned)	Hany El Sagheer	Ezz	4:16
12.	"Kollohom" (كلهم All of Them)	Ayman Bahgat Amar	Mostafa	3:57
13.	"Khalleeny Ganbak"	Refai	Nour; Diab	5:18
Total length:				51:12

Bonus track on some editions (with track 7 removed)
No.	Title	Lyrics	Music	Length
13.	"Allem Alby" (remix)	Galal	Ezz; Diab	4:13
Total length:				53:18

== Personnel ==
Credits adapted from the album's liner notes. The track numbering in this section is based on that of the album's standard edition.

Studios

- Recorded and mixed at Leila Studios, ART Studios, Sout El Hob Studios, Cornet Studio, and M. Sound Studios

Musicians

- Amr Diab – vocals (all tracks), instrumental solo composition (track 9), music direction
- Yasser Malallah – Khaliji percussion (tracks 1, 4)
- Reda Bedair – nay (track 1), soloist (tracks 9, 12)
- Mostafa Aslan – Spanish guitar (tracks 2, 3, 6, 12, 13), electric guitar (track 8)
- Ahmed El Ayadi – tabla (tracks 2, 10, 12, 13)
- Hany Farahat – oriental violin solo (tracks 2, 4)
- İsmail Tunçbilek – buzuq (track 3)
- Aytaç Doğan – qanun (track 3)
- Pino Fares – electric guitar (tracks 3, 4), guitar solo (tracks 4, 5), folk guitar (track 5), guitar (track 13)
- Fahad – piano (track 5)
- Ibrahim Fathy – kawala (track 6)
- Hussein Saber – oud (tracks 6, 10), soloist (tracks 9, 12)
- Farouk Mohamed Hassan – soloist (tracks 9, 12)
- Maged Sorour – soloist (tracks 9, 12)
- Khaled Ezz – instrumental solo composition (track 10)
- Hassan Anwar – riq (track 10)
- Amr Shaker – Fender Rhodes solo (track 11)
- Mahmoud Sorour – soloist (track 12)
- Ousso – electric guitar solo (track 13)
- Ahmed Ragab – bass guitar (track 13)
- Kashmir – clarinet (track 13)

Technical

- Fahad – arrangement (tracks 1, 3–5, 7, 9, 10, 13)
- Hany Yacoub – arrangement (tracks 2, 6, 8, 12), remix (bonus track)
- Amr Shaker – arrangement (track 11)
- Hany Farahat – string arrangement (tracks 1–5, 7, 13)
- Yehia El Mougy – oriental arrangement (track 9)
- Mohamed Sakr – engineering; mixing (tracks 1–4, 6–8, 11–13), digital mastering
- Yasser Anwar – engineering; mixing (tracks 5, 9, 10)
- Khaled Raouf – engineering
- Fady Temsah – engineering
- Yasser Hussein – engineering
- Ahmed Gouda – engineering

== External Reviews ==
Album Review on AllMusic
