= Nour El Ain =

1996 studio album by Amr Diab

Studio album by Amr Diab
- Released: 1996
- Studios: M. Sound (Cairo, Egypt); Sono Cairo (Cairo, Egypt)
- Length: 39:35
- Language: Egyptian Arabic
- Labels: Alam El Phan; EMI Arabia
- Producer: Hamid Al Shaeri

Amr Diab chronology
Ragein (1995)	Nour El Ain (1996)	Awedony (1998)

Singles from Nour El Ain
- 1. "Nour El Ain" Released: 1996

Nour El Ain or Nour El Ein (Egyptian Arabic: نور العين, romanized: Nūr el-ʿēn, lit. 'Light of the Eye', IPA: [nuːɾ elˈʕeːn]) is Egyptian singer Amr Diab's most successful album. It was released in 1996 and became a tremendous success not only in the Middle East but worldwide. The album was recognized at the World Music Awards for the best-selling album in the Middle East for 1996. The music video for the song Nour El Ain was filmed in the Egyptian city of Hurghada.

== Track listing ==
The unofficial italicised English titles listed below are the closest and most accurate translations of the original titles.

Nour El Ain track listing
No.	Title	Lyrics	Music	Length
1.	"Nour El Ain" (نور العين Light of the Eye)	Ahmed Sheta	Nasser al-Mezdawi	5:05
2.	"Moush Had'af" (مش هضعف I Won't Weaken)	Magdy El Naggar	Amr Diab	5:22
3.	"Nafs El Makan" (نفس المكان The Same Place)	Medhat El Adl	Riad El Hamshari	4:35
4.	"Leila Men Omri" (ليلة من عمري A Night of My Life)	Sheta	Diab	4:53
5.	"Ayzeen Yeghayyarook" (عايزين يغيروك They Want to Change You)	El Adl	El Hamshari	5:52
6.	"Men Awwel Marrah (Mehtaglaha)" (من أول مرة [محتاجلها] From the First Time [I Need Her])	El Naggar	Al-Mezdawi	4:34
7.	"Ew'idni" (اوعدني Promise Me)	Mostafa Kamel	El Hamshari	5:24
8.	"Yomenhom" (يومينهم Their Days)	El Naggar	Diab	3:50
Total length:				39:35

== Personnel ==
Credits adapted from the album's liner notes.

Recording locations

- Recorded and mixed at M. Sound Studios and Sono Cairo Studios

Musicians

- Amr Diab
- Samir Sorour
- Farouk Mohamed Hassan
- Amr Tantawy
- Fouad Rahim
- Khaled Gomaa
- Maged Sorour
- Ibrahim Fathy
- Nabil Bergas
- Tarek El Tahtawi

Technical

- Hamid Al Shaeri – arrangement
- Mohamed Arram – string arrangement
- Yehia El Mougy – string arrangement (tracks 4, 8)
- Ahmed Gouda – recording, mixing
- Tarek Madkour – digital mastering

Artwork

- Fouad Burham – photography
