= Aktar Wahed =

2001 studio album by Amr Diab

Studio album by Amr Diab
- Released: 2001
- Length: 43:43
- Language: Egyptian Arabic (Note: Except track 1 partly composed of English lyrics.)
- Labels: Alam El Phan; EMI Arabia
- Producer: Tarek Madkour

Amr Diab chronology
Tamally Maak (2000)	Aktar Wahed (2001)	Allem Alby (2003)

Aktar Wahed (Note: Egyptian Arabic: أكتر واحد, romanized: Aktar Wāḥid, lit. 'The Most One', IPA: [ˈʔaktar ˈwaːħed]) (also known as Aktar Wahed Beihebak (Note: Egyptian Arabic: أكتر واحد بيحبك, romanized: Aktar Wāḥid Bīyḥibbak, lit. 'The One Who Loves You the Most', IPA: [ˈʔaktar ˈwaːħed biˈħebbak])) is a studio album by Amr Diab, and was released in 2001 following the success of the previous album Tamally Maak, it contains 10 tracks, as the head of the album was "Wala Ala Baloh". The album received the World Music Award for the best-selling album in the Middle East for 2001.

== Commercial performance ==
After the great success of Tamally Maak in 2000, the album Aktar Wahed achieved the highest sales in the history of singing in the Middle East and North Africa, where its sales reached 11 million copies.

== Track listing ==
The unofficial italicised English titles listed below are the closest and most accurate translations of the original titles.

Aktar Wahed track listing
No.	Title	Lyrics	Music	Length
1.	"Wala Ala Baloh" (ولا على باله Not on His Mind)	Mohamed Refai	Mohamed Rahim	5:12
2.	"Aktar Wahed" (أكتر واحد The Most One)	Ahmed Ali Mousa; Ayman Bahgat Amar	Amr Mostafa	4:31
3.	"Kan Tayeb" (كان طيب He Was Kind)	Amar	Amr Diab	5:21
4.	"Ba'ed El Layali" (بَعِّد الليالي I Count the Nights)	Refai	Khaled Ezz	4:30
5.	"Olt Eih" (قُلت إيه What Do You Think?)	Khaled Tag El Din	Mostafa	4:03
6.	"Wala Leila" (ولا ليلة What a Night)	Amar	El Badri Kelbash	4:07
7.	"Adini Rege'telek" (أديني رجعتلك Here I Am, Back to You)	Bahaa El Din Mohamed	Diab	3:41
8.	"Sada'ni Khalas" (صدقني خلاص Believe Me, That's It)	Amar	Mostafa	3:51
9.	"Ahebbek Akrahek" (أحبك أكرهك I Love You, I Hate You)	Amar	Mostafa	4:33
10.	"Ya Habibi La" (يا حبيبي لا No, My Love)	Mohamed	Mostafa	3:54
Total length:				43:43

Bonus track on some editions
No.	Title	Lyrics	Music	Length
11.	"Wala Ala Baloh" (oriental mix)	Refai	Rahim	3:33
Total length:				47:16

== Personnel ==
Credits adapted from the album's liner notes.

Musicians

- Amr Diab – vocals (all tracks), string composition (track 4), music direction
- Hussein Saber – oud (tracks 1, 6, 7, 11)
- Reda Bedair – nay (tracks 1, 11)
- Maged Sorour – qanun (tracks 1, 4, 7, 11)
- Sandman – rap vocals (track 1)
- Pino Fares – Spanish guitar solo (tracks 2, 5, 6, 8, 9), rhythm Spanish guitar (track 2), instrumental solo composition (track 9)
- Ahmed El Ayadi – tabla (tracks 2, 3)
- Mostafa Aslan – guitar (track 3), rhythm Spanish guitar (tracks 4–9), lead and rhythm folk guitar (track 10)
- Nabil Bergas – nay (track 3)
- Hisham El Araby – riq (track 3)
- Farouk Mohamed Hassan – accordion (track 6)
- Ibrahim Fathy – kawala (track 7)
- Yehia El Mougy – violin (tracks 7, 10)
- Tarek Madkour – piano (track 8), vibraphone (track 9), instrumental solo composition (track 10)

Technical

- Tarek Madkour – arrangement (all tracks), music direction, final mixing, editing, digital mastering
- Yehia El Mougy – string arrangement
- Yasser Anwar – recording, mixing

Artwork

- Khaled Roshdy – layout, cover design

== Covers of some songs ==
- The Serbian singer Jami, in her 2004 album, released a song entitled "One stvari", which is a Serbian cover version of Diab's "Wala Ala Baloh". One year later, the Uzbek singer Yodgor Mirjazajonov released an Uzbek language version of the same song entitled "Gózalim".
