= Leily Nahary =

Studio album by Amr Diab
- Released: 2004
- Studios: Leila (Giza, Egypt); Jana (Giza, Egypt)
- Length: 39:08
- Language: Egyptian Arabic
- Labels: Rotana; Stallions
- Producers: Nader Hamdy; Tarek Tawakol

Amr Diab chronology
Allem Alby (2003)	Leily Nahary (2004)	Kammel Kalamak (2005)

Leily Nahary or Lealy Nahary (Egyptian Arabic: ليلي نهاري, romanized: Leilī Nahārī, lit. 'My Night, My Day', IPA: [ˈleːli nɑˈhɑːri]) is an album by Amr Diab released in the summer of 2004.

The album contains 10 tracks, including a video clip for "Leily Nahary", which was directed by Cameron Casey. It was the biggest release of 2004 in Egypt and many Arab countries, marking Amr Diab's first album recorded with Rotana after leaving Alam El Phan in 2003.

== Track listing ==
The unofficial italicised English titles listed below are the closest and most accurate translations of the original titles.

Leily Nahary track listing
No.	Title	Lyrics	Music	Length
1.	"Leily Nahary" (ليلي نهاري My Night, My Day)	Khaled Tag El Din	Amr Mostafa	4:06
2.	"Wahashtiny" (وحشتيني I Miss You)	Ayman Bahgat Amar	Mostafa	3:57
3.	"Tinsa Wahda" (تنسى واحدة Forget One)	Bahaa El Din Mohamed	Amr Diab	4:24
4.	"Khad Alby Ma'ah" (خَد قلبي معاه He Took My Heart with Him)	Amar	Amr Tantawy	4:03
5.	"Yedu' El Bab" (يدق الباب The Door Knocks)	Mohamed	Mohamed Yehia	3:32
6.	"Dayman Fi Baly" (دايمًا في بالي Always on My Mind)	Khaled Mounir	Mohamed Rahim	3:47
7.	"Khaleena Neshofak" (خلينا نشوفك Let Us See You)	Nader Abdallah	Yehia	3:58
8.	"Osad Einy" (قصاد عيني In Front of My Eyes)	Tag El Din	Mostafa	4:24
9.	"Illa Heya" (إلا هي Except Her)	Magdy El Naggar	Mostafa	3:43
10.	"Rihet El Habayib" (ريحة الحبايب The Scent of Loved Ones)	Abdallah	Yehia	3:14
Total length:				39:08

== Personnel ==
Credits adapted from the album's liner notes.

Studios

- Recorded at Leila Studios and Jana Studio
- Mastered at Metropolis Studios (London, England)

Musicians

- Amr Diab – vocals (all tracks), music direction
- Mostafa Aslan – rhythm Spanish guitar (tracks 1, 5), Spanish guitar solo (track 5), guitar (track 9), electric guitar (track 10)
- Ahmed Rocket – Spanish guitar solo (track 1), Spanish guitar (track 3), lead and rhythm folk guitar (track 8), guitar (track 10)
- Ashraf Fouad – timbales (track 1)
- Ahmed El Ayadi – tabla (tracks 1, 5)
- Amr Tantawy – guitar (track 2)
- Nader Hamdy – piano (tracks 2, 8), percussion (track 4)
- Said El Artist – tabla (tracks 3, 4, 7)
- Farouk Mohamed Hassan – accordion (tracks 4, 9)
- Ousso – electric guitar solo (track 5)
- Nabil Bergas – nay (tracks 5, 7, 10)
- Yehia El Mougy – violin (tracks 5, 10)
- Hussein Saber – oud (track 6)
- Alaa Saber – buzuq (track 6)
- Ahmed Abdel Fattah – accordion (track 7)
- Ibrahim Fathy – kawala (track 9)

Technical

- Nader Hamdy – arrangement (tracks 1–6, 8–10)
- Tarek Tawakol – arrangement (track 7)
- Yehia El Mougy – string arrangement (tracks 3, 4, 7)
- Mark "Killaloop" Lewis – drum programming (track 4)
- Tamer El Zoueibi – recording, engineering, mixing
- Tim Young – digital mastering
- Martin Granville-Twig – digital mastering

Artwork

- Khaled Roshdy – album cover, layout design
