= Tamally Maak (album) =

2000 studio album by Amr Diab

Studio album by Amr Diab
- Released: 2000
- Studios: M. Sound (Cairo, Egypt)
- Length: 42:57
- Language: Egyptian Arabic
- Labels: Alam El Phan; EMI Arabia
- Producer: Tarek Madkour

Amr Diab chronology
Amarain (1999)	Tamally Maak (2000)	Aktar Wahed (2001)

Tamally Maak or Tamally Ma'ak (Egyptian Arabic: تملي معاك, romanized: Tamallī Maʻāk, lit. 'Always with You', IPA: [tæˈmæl.li mæˈʕæːk]) is a 2000 album by Amr Diab that contains his international hit single of the same name. The album earned a huge success in MENA and worldwide.

== Track listing ==
The unofficial italicised English titles listed below are the closest and most accurate translations of the original titles.

Tamally Maak track listing
No.	Title	Lyrics	Music	Length
1.	"El Alem Allah" (العالِم الله God Knows)	Amir Teima	Amr Mostafa; Amr Diab	4:04
2.	"Tamally Maak" (تملي معاك Always with You)	Ahmed Ali Mousa	Sherif Tag	4:29
3.	"Keda Einy Einak" (كده عيني عينك Just Like That, Right in Front of My Eyes?)	Ayman Bahgat Amar	Diab	4:13
4.	"We Heya Amla Eih" (وهي عاملة إيه And How Is She?)	Bahaa El Din Mohamed	Essam Karika	4:42
5.	"Senien" (سنين Years)	Mohamed Refai	Tag	4:30
6.	"A'mel Eih" (أعمل إيه What Should I Do?)	Teima	Mostafa	4:31
7.	"Law Kan Yerdik" (لو كان يرضيك If That Pleases You)	Amar	Walid Saad	4:25
8.	"Ba'teref" (بعترف I Confess)	Amar	Mostafa	4:11
9.	"Alby Ekhtarak" (قلبي اختارك My Heart Chose You)	Rabea El Seufy	Tag	4:11
10.	"Sa'ban Alaya" (صعبان عليا It's Hard for Me)	Refai	Tag	3:41
Total length:				42:57

Bonus track on some editions (placed at the top of the list)
No.	Title	Length
1.	"El Alem Allah" (music video, directed by Sherif Sabri)	4:22
Total length:		47:19

== Personnel ==
Credits adapted from the album's liner notes.

Studios

- Recorded and mixed at M. Sound Studio Two

Musicians

- Amr Diab – vocals (all tracks)
- Pino Fares – guitar solo (tracks 1, 2, 5, 9), rhythm guitar (track 1), guitar (track 8)
- Amr Tantawy – rhythm guitar (tracks 2, 5, 10)
- Hisham El Araby – riq (tracks 3, 6, 7)
- Ahmed El Ayadi – tabla (tracks 3, 6, 7), duf (track 4)
- Yehia El Mougy – violin solo (tracks 5, 10)
- Aytaç Doğan – qanun (tracks 6, 7)
- İsmail Tunçbilek – buzuq (track 6)
- Hussein Saber – oud (track 7)
- Ibrahim Fathy – kawala (track 7)
- Tarek Madkour – piano (track 8)

Technical

- Tarek Madkour – arrangement (all tracks), drum programming, digital mastering
- Yehia El Mougy – string arrangement
- Amir Mahrous – recording, mixing
- Ibrahim Ezzat – engineering
- Zakaria – engineering
- Maher Sadek – copy mastering
- Wael – copy mastering

Artwork

- Khaled Roshdy – layout, cover design
- Mohamed Gabr – photography
