= Amira (Egyptian singer) =

Egyptian pop singer (born 1974)

Amira (Hanan Ahmed Mohamed) أميرة
- Born: Hanan Ahmed Mohamed حنان أحمد محمد; February 25, 1974 (age 52)
- Origin: Giza, Egypt
- Genres: Egyptian music
- Occupation: Singer
- Years active: 1989–1997
- Labels: Free Music; Alam El Phan; Mazzika

Hanan Ahmed Mohamed is an Egyptian singer, she is also known as Amira (Princess).

== Early life ==
Hanan was born Cairo, and grew up in an artistic family. Her grandmother was Amira Kamel, the opera singer, and her aunt Fayda Kamel is an Egyptian singer and politician. She graduated from The Higher Institute of Arabic Music.

== Career ==
- Hanan began her artistic career after graduating to sing at the institute, then sang at the Cairo Opera House.
- Hanan was distinguished by her sweet voice during the nineties. Her career began by chance, when she met With Hamid Al Shaeri, who participated with Badiou in her first album, in addition to producing it.
- She contracted with Al Sharq Company to distribute the album and participate in its production. (Alam El Fan or Mazzika currently after it bought the East).
- Everyone expected that Hanan would succeed, and her fame would spread and producers would rush to her due to the spread of her album, but this did not happen. She disappeared after the release of her album in 1994 and did not appear again and it was said that she got married.

== Works ==
- Hamid Al Shaeri participated in the album Kawahel, after which Hamid introduced her to the producer Tareq Abdullah and she participated in the album "High Quality" with two songs; Layli and Ghair Qalbak.
- Hanan's fame spread, so she collaborated with Alaa Abdel Khaleq in the song "I Love You Constantly", which was a turning point in their artistic career. Hanan became the singer who collaborated the most with other singers in duets, most notably Mohamed Mounir, and she sang with him the magic of the singer.
- She presented her first and last album, Awwal Kalamy, in 1993, which collected a number of Distinguished authors and composers, writing was presented by Adel Omar, Hani Al-Sagheer, Sameh Al-Ajami and Mustafa Zaki, and composed by Mustafa Kamel and Essam Karika in the song "Qawi", and Moustafa Amar, Ashraf Al-Sarkhogly, Hamid Al-Shaeri and Mohsen Taher, and Nasser Al-Mazdawi composed and wrote "Like Birds", and Hamid Al-Shaeri participated in singing it to present at the time with Amira one of the best and most famous duets.
- She presented the duet "Wast El-Daera" with Mohamed Mounir, at the opening of the Mediterranean Games.
