= Kammel Kalamak =

2005 studio album by Amr Diab

Studio album by Amr Diab
- Released: 2005
- Length: 39:36
- Language: Egyptian Arabic
- Label: Rotana
- Producers: Tarek Madkour; Adel Hakki; Fahad

Amr Diab chronology
Leily Nahary (2004)	Kammel Kalamak (2005)	El Lilady (2007)

Kammel Kalamak (Egyptian Arabic: كَمِّل كلامك, romanized: Kammil Kalāmak, lit. 'Keep Talking', IPA: [ˈkæmme-l kɑˈlæːmæk]) is the 22nd album by Amr Diab, and the second with Rotana was released at the end of 2005.

== Sales ==
The album has sold over 1,500,000 copies since its release.

== Track listing ==
The unofficial italicised English titles listed below are the closest and most accurate translations of the original titles.

Kammel Kalamak track listing
No.	Title	Lyrics	Music	Length
1.	"Kammel Kalamak" (كمل كلامك Keep Talking)	Amir Teima	Nasser al-Mezdawi	4:00
2.	"We Maloh" (وماله Why Not?)	Khaled Tag El Din	Amr Mostafa	4:48
3.	"Wehkaytak Eih" (وحكايتك إيه And What's Your Story?)	Teima	Mohamed Rahim	4:14
4.	"Ayyam we-Ben'eshha" (أيام وبنعيشها Days We Are Living)	Ayman Bahgat Amar	Mohamed Yehia	3:15
5.	"Allah La Yehremny Minnak" (الله لا يحرمني منك May God Not Deprive Me of You)	Teima	Mostafa	3:52
6.	"Oddam Oyounak" (قدام عيونك In Front of Your Eyes)	Tag El Din	Mostafa	3:48
7.	"Ma'ak Begad" (معاك بجد Truly with You)	Amar	Amr Diab	4:11
8.	"Aywa Ana 'Aref" (أيوة أنا عارف Yes, I Know)	Bahaa El Din Mohamed	Diab	3:51
9.	"Betkhaby Leh" (بتخبي ليه Why Are You Hiding It?)	Amar	Mostafa	4:06
10.	"Agheeb" (أغيب I Disappear)	Mohamed	Diab; Yehia	3:31
Total length:				39:36

== Personnel ==
Credits adapted from the album's liner notes.

Musicians

- Amr Diab – vocals (all tracks), music direction
- Ousso – guitar (tracks 1, 5, 7)
- Juan Cerro – guitar (tracks 2, 6, 10), jazz guitar (track 8), Spanish guitar solo (track 9)
- Nader Hamdy – piano (track 2)
- Hisham El Araby – riq (tracks 3, 7)
- Reda Bedair – nay (tracks 3, 4, 7)
- Mostafa Aslan – guitar and buzuq solo (track 3)
- Essam Abdel Radi – tabla (tracks 3, 7)
- Maged Sorour – qanun (tracks 4, 10)
- Ashraf Fouad – rototom (track 7)
- Pino Fares – guitar (track 8)
- Farouk Mohamed Hassan – accordion (track 8)
- Ibrahim Fathy – kawala (track 9)

Technical

- Tarek Madkour – arrangement (tracks 1–5, 7, 9), music direction, recording, mixing, digital mastering
- Adel Hakki – arrangement (tracks 6, 10)
- Fahad – arrangement (track 8)
- Yehia El Mougy – string arrangement (tracks 3–5, 7)
- Mohamed Sakr – recording, mixing, digital mastering

Artwork

- Khaled Roshdy – album cover, layout design
