= The Arab Dream =

"Al-Ḥulm al-ʿArabī"

Song
- Language: Arabic
- English title: "The Arab Dream"
- Published: 1998
- Recorded: 1996
- Genre: Operetta
- Composers: Salah al-Sharnubi; Helmi Bakr; Hamid al-Sha'iri
- Lyricist: Medhat al-Adl
- Producers: Ahmad al-Aryan; Hamid al-Sha'iri

"The Arab Dream" (Arabic: الحلم العربي, romanized: al-Ḥulm al-ʿArabī) is a 1996 pan-Arab song, discussing themes of Arab unity and pan-Arabism. Often described as an "operetta" in the Arab world, the song includes performances by 22 Arab artists.

The song, first aired in 1998, reached wider popularity in 2000 with the start of the Second Intifada, when satellite channels throughout the Arab world broadcast the operetta's music video as a form of solidarity with Palestinians.

== Featured artists ==
The following performers featured on the track:

- Ahlam
- Ahmed Al Jumairi
- Ahmed Fathi
- Ali Abdul Sattar
- Anoushka
- Assala Nasri
- Diana Haddad
- Ehab Tawfik
- Ghada Ragab
- Hamid Al Sha'iri
- Laila Ghofran
- Latifa
- Majid Al Mazrooqi
- Mohamed El Helw
- Mohamed El Mazem
- Nabil Shuail
- Nasser El Mizdawi
- Nour Mhanna
- Omar Al-Abdallat
- Somayya Hassan
- Thekra
- Walid Toufic

== 2024 version ==
In February 2024, a new version of the song was recorded following a resurgence of popularity due to the Gaza humanitarian crisis during the Gaza war. The recording features vocals by 12 artists, namely Abu, Assi El Hallani, Balqees, Majid Al Mohandis, Mohammed Assaf, Saber Rebai as well as Ahlam, Ahmed Fathi, Assala Nasri, Ehab Tawfik, Omar Al-Abdallat and Walid Toufic, who had been featured in the original version.
