= Wayah =

2009 studio album by Amr Diab

Studio album by Amr Diab
- Released: 28 June 2009
- Studios: Metropolis (London, England)
- Length: 45:46
- Language: Egyptian Arabic
- Label: Rotana
- Producer: Hassan El Shafei

Amr Diab chronology
El Lilady (2007)	Wayah (2009)	Banadeek Ta'ala (2011)

Wayah (Egyptian Arabic: وَيّاه, romanized: Wayyāh, lit. 'With Him', IPA: [wæjˈjæːh]) is a 2009 album by Amr Diab. The album contains 12 tracks.

== Public reception ==
Wayah was released for sale in stores but the album was leaked online and illegally downloaded. Diab fans began a massive boycott of those sites and went to stores to support the artist.

== Commercial performance ==
The album topped the sales list, after selling more than 100,000 copies on the first day of its release, and has achieved sales of more than 3 million since its release in the summer of 2009.

== Track listing ==
The unofficial italicised English titles listed below are the closest and most accurate translations of the original titles.

Wayah track listing
No.	Title	Lyrics	Music	Length
1.	"Wayah" (وياه With Him)	Tamer Hussein	Amr Mostafa	4:52
2.	"Ba'adem Alby" (بقَدِّم قلبي I Offer My Heart)	Ayman Bahgat Amar	Mostafa	2:59
3.	"Illa Habibi" (إلا حبيبي Except My Love)	Abdel Moneim Taha	M'hamed al-Amin Hassan Bey; Amr Diab	3:24
4.	"Allah Ala Hobak" (الله على حبك Oh God, How Beautiful Your Love Is)	Magdy El Naggar	Mostafa	3:42
5.	"Yehemak Fe Eh" (يهمك في إيه What Does It Matter to You?)	Amar	Mohamed Yehia	4:08
6.	"Helwa El Ayam" (حلوة الأيام The Days Are Sweet)	Khaled Tag El Din	Diab	3:50
7.	"Tammeny" (طمنّي Reassure Me)	Tag El Din	El Badri Kelbash	2:52
8.	"Malak" (مالَك What's Wrong with You?)	Amar	Diab	4:08
9.	"Wehyati Khaliki" (وحياتي خليكي For My Sake, Stay)	Taha	Amr Tantawy	3:50
10.	"Einy Wana Shayfo" (عيني وأنا شايفه My Eyes as I See Him)	Bahaa El Din Mohamed	Mostafa	3:23
11.	"Ah Min El Fora'" (آه من الفراق Oh, the Pain of Separation)	Mohamed	Diab	4:27
12.	"Ba'edt Leh" (بَعِّدْت ليه Why Did You Leave?)	Hany Abdel Karim	Khaled Ezz	4:11
Total length:				45:46

== Personnel ==
Credits adapted from the album's liner notes.

Studios

- Recorded, mixed, and digitally mastered at Metropolis Studios (London)
- Track 3 was recorded in Beirut, Lebanon

Musicians

- Amr Diab – performer, music direction
- Mostafa Aslan – guitar (tracks 1, 2, 4–8, 10–12)
- Hany Farahat – violin (track 3)
- Mohamed Saleh – bouzouki (track 3)
- Ali Mazbouh – nay (track 3)
- Ahmed El Ayadi – tabla (tracks 3, 8, 11)
- Hisham El Araby – riq (tracks 3, 8, 11)
- Farouk Mohamed Hassan – accordion (track 8)
- Jon Bishop – guitar (track 9)
- Hassan El Shafei – piano (track 9)
- Maged Sorour – qanun (track 11)
- Reda Bedair – nay (track 11)

Technical

- Hassan El Shafei – production, arrangement (all tracks)
- Yehia El Mougy – string arrangement (tracks 8, 11)
- Tamer El Zoueibi – engineering (tracks 1–6, 12), digital mastering (track 1)
- Mohamed Sakr – engineering (tracks 7–11)
- Tony Cousins – recording (tracks 1, 2, 4–12), mixing (all tracks), digital mastering (tracks 2–12)
- Elie Saba – recording (track 3)

Artwork

- Karim Nour – album photography, design, cover, poster

== Awards ==
- African Music Awards 2009 ( Artist of the Year – Song of the Year – Music Video of the Year – Male Act of the Year )
