= El Lilady =

2007 studio album by Amr Diab

Studio album by Amr Diab
- Released: 11 July 2007
- Studios: Metropolis (London, England)
- Length: 36:34
- Language: Egyptian Arabic
- Label: Rotana
- Producers: Hassan El Shafei; Fahad

Amr Diab chronology
Kammel Kalamak (2005)	El Lilady (2007)	Wayah (2009)

El Lilady (Egyptian Arabic: الليلادي, romanized: el-Leilādī, lit. 'This Night', IPA: [el.leːˈlæː.di]) is a 2007 studio album by Amr Diab. The album was awarded a World Music Award as the best selling album in the Middle East for 2007.

== Commercial performance ==
The album achieved huge sales, with +2,000,000 copies sold and occupied the first place in Egypt for 22 consecutive weeks.

== Track listing ==
The unofficial italicised English titles listed below are the closest and most accurate translations of the original titles.

El Lilady track listing
No.	Title	Lyrics	Music	Length
1.	"Ne'oul Eih" (نقول إيه What Can We Say?)	Ayman Bahgat Amar	Amr Mostafa	4:02
2.	"El Lilady" (الليلادي This Night)	Amar	Mostafa	2:57
3.	"Toul Mana Shaifak" (طول ما أنا شايفك As Long as I See You)	Magdy El Naggar	Mohamed Yehia	3:30
4.	"Hikayat" (حكايات Stories)	El Naggar	Yehia	4:06
5.	"Inta El Ghaly" (إنتَ الغالي You Are the Precious One)	El Naggar	El Badri Kelbash	3:49
6.	"Rohy Mertahalak" (روحي مرتاحالك My Soul Is Comfortable with You)	Amir Teima	Yehia	3:43
7.	"Aletly Oul" (قالتلي قول She Told Me to Say)	Bahaa El Din Mohamed	Amr Diab	3:30
8.	"We-Fhemt Einik" (وفهمت عينيك And I Understood Your Eyes)	Khaled Tag El Din	Mostafa	3:43
9.	"Dehket" (ضحكت She Smiled)	Mohamed	Diab	3:31
10.	"Khalik Ma'aya" (خليك معايا Stay with Me)	Amar	Yehia	3:43
Total length:				36:34

== Personnel ==
Credits adapted from the album's liner notes.

Studios

- Recorded, mixed, and digitally mastered at Metropolis Studios

Musicians

- Amr Diab – performer, music direction
- Mostafa Aslan – guitar (all tracks), buzuq (track 7)
- Saad Mohamed Hassan – violin solo (track 1), violin (track 8)
- Farouk Mohamed Hassan – accordion (track 3)
- Reda Bedair – nay (tracks 3, 5)
- Ahmed El Ayadi – tabla (tracks 3, 7, 9)
- Hisham El Araby – riq (tracks 3, 7)
- Amr Tantawy – guitar (track 6)
- Hany El Badry – nay (track 8)
- Diaa Badr – percussion (track 8)
- Raafat Misso – saxophone (track 9)
- Hussein Saber – oud (track 9)

Technical

- Hassan El Shafei – arrangement (tracks 1–5, 8, 10)
- Fahad – arrangement (tracks 6, 7, 9)
- Yehia El Mougy – string arrangement (tracks 1, 3, 7)
- Mohamed Sakr – engineering (tracks 1–4, 9, 10)
- Tamer El Zoueibi – engineering (tracks 5–8)
- Tony Cousins – recording, mixing, digital mastering

Artwork

- Karim Nour – album photography, design, cover, poster
