= Tamally Maak =

2000 song by Amr Diab

Promotional single by Amr Diab

from the album Tamally Maak
- Language: Egyptian Arabic
- English title: "Always with You"
- Released: 2000
- Studio: M. Sound (Cairo, Egypt)
- Genre: Arabic pop
- Length: 4:29
- Label: Alam El Phan
- Composer: Sherif Tag
- Lyricist: Ahmed Ali Mousa
- Producer: Tarek Madkour

Amr Diab promotional singles chronology
"Bahebbak Aktar" (1999)	"Tamally Maak" (2000)	"El Alem Allah" (2000)

Music video
- "Tamally Maak" on YouTube

"Tamally Maak" or "Tamally Ma'ak" (Egyptian Arabic: تملي معاك, romanized: Tamallī Maʻāk, lit. 'Always with You', IPA: [tæˈmæl.li mæˈʕæːk]) is a song by the Egyptian pop singer Amr Diab from his studio album, Tamally Maak (2000).

"Tamally Maak", meaning "Always with you", is written by Ahmed Ali Moussa and the music for the song was composed by Sherif Tag. Original arrangement was by Tarek Madkour. The very popular video was filmed in Czech Republic and the instrumentation prominently included the classic guitar. The song received positive reviews from critics, with Rolling Stone naming "Tamally Maak" the best Arabic pop song of the 21st century.

== Personnel ==
Credits adapted from the liner notes of Tamally Maak.

- Amr Diab – vocals
- Ahmed Ali Mousa – lyrics
- Sherif Tag – composer
- Pino Fares – guitar solo
- Amr Tantawy – rhythm guitar
- Tarek Madkour – arrangement

== Language covers ==
The song has been interpreted in a large number of languages, including:

- Albanian: "Vetem ty te kam" by Gazmend Rama (Video)
- Armenian: "Vonc Heranam" (Ոնց հեռանամ) by Olga Ayvazyan (Video)
- Bulgarian: "Skitam Se Az" (Скитам се аз) by Ivana (Video)
- English:
  - "Callin U" by Outlandish (Video)
  - "Pretty My Pretty" by Avraam Russo (bilingual with Arabic) (Video)
  - "Callin’ U" by Elyanna (bilingual with Arabic) (Video)
- Greek: "Gia Proti Fora" by Lefteris Pantazis (Video)
- Greek: "Ego Den Mporo" by Makis Dimakis (Video)
- Hebrew: "Ata be libi" (אתה בלבי) by Duo Datz (Video)
- Hebrew: "Tamally Maak" (תמלי מעאכ) by Tsaḥi Halevi (Video)
  - This rendition is in the original Arabic; the title has merely been transliterated into Hebrew.
- Hebrew: "Tamally Maak" (תמלי מעאכ) by Sofi Tsedaka (Video)
  - This rendition is in the original Arabic; the title has merely been transliterated into Hebrew.
- Hindi: "Kaho Na Kaho" (کہو نہ کہو) (कहो ना कहो) by Amir Jamal (bilingual with Arabic) (Video)
- Kannada: "Oho Nasheyo" (ಓಹೋ ನಶೆಯೋ) by Gurukiran (Video)
- Persian: "Didi Goftam" (دیدی گفتم) by Farshid Amin (Video)
- Romanian: "Sunt singur pe drum" by Iulian Copilu (Video)
- Romanian: "INNA - Tamally Maak x Callin' U (Cover)" (Video)
  - This rendition is in English and Arabic
- Russian: "Daleko Daleko" (Далеко-далёко) by Avraam Russo (Video)
- Serbian: "Doživeću ja" (Доживећу jа) by Mile Kitić (Video)
- Spanish: "Te Quiero a Ti" by Antonio Carmona (Video)
- Spanish: "Te Voy a Dejar" by Andrea Del Valle Bela (Video)
- Tamil: "Boomiku Velichamellam" (பூமிக்கு வெளிச்சமெல்லாம்) (only some places in the Interludes) by Gayathri and Vijay Antony from the film Dishyum (2006) (Video)
- Turkish: "Gönül Yarası" by Erkan Guleryuz ((Video)

== Film appearances ==
- The Hindi version ("Kaho Na Kaho") was used for the Soundtrack of the 2004 Hindi film Murder.
- The Tamil version ("Bhoomiku", only the interlude tune) was used for the soundtrack of the 2006 Tamil movie Dishyum.
- The Kannada version was used for the soundtrack of the 2006 Kannada movie Ganda Hendathi.
- The song was used in the French 2009 film Coco.
- The song was used in the Israeli TV series Fauda, sung by Tzachi Halevy.
- The song was used in the American film Just Like A Woman (2012) by Rachid Boucharb in 01:10:49

== Covers ==
In 2000, the song was covered in English by Armenian-Russian singer Avraam Russo. Despite being predominantly in English, Russo did retain the song's Arabic lyrics in a few verses. He also did a full Russian cover with different lyrics (Russian: Потерянный рай, The Lost Paradise).

In 2016, the song was revived by Canadian-Lebanese artist Miray who remixed it into an English/Arabic amalgam, featuring rapper Jay Soul.
