= Simone Philip Kamel =

Simone
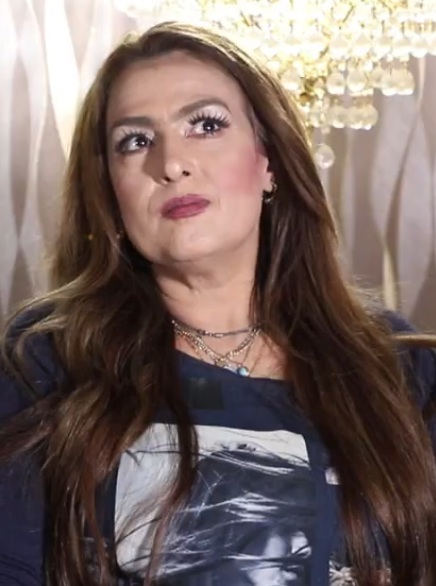
- Simone in 2022

Background information
- Born: Simone Philip Kamel; 14 June 1966 (age 60); Shubra, Cairo, Egypt
- Genre: Pop
- Occupations: Singer; actress
- Years active: 1987–present

Simone Philip Kamel (Arabic: سيمون فيليپ كامل; born 14 June 1966), known mononymously as Simone, is an Egyptian singer, that throughout the 1990s was famous for her soprano voice.

== Life and career ==
=== Early life and education ===
Simone has a bachelor's degree in French literature from the Ain Shams University.

=== Beginning of musical career ===
She participated in the Greek-Egyptian Friendship Festival where she sang a song in Greek.

== Famous songs ==
- "مش نظرة وابتسامة" (Not Just a Look and a Smile)
- "تاكسي" (Taxi)
- "خاف مني" (Fear Me)
- "مبسوطة" (Happy)
- "تاني تاني" (Again, Again)
- "ميرسي" (Thank You)
- "ساعتى مش مظبوطة" (My Watch is not Set)
- "كازانوفا" (Casanova)
- "بتكلم جد" (I'm Talking Seriously)

== Movies ==
- يوم مر ويوم حلو (A Bitter Day and a Sweet Day) (1988)
- الهجامة (The Home Invaders) (1992)
- أيس كريم فى جليم (Ice Cream in Glym) (1992)
- حالة اشتباه (Suspect) (1992)
- فزاع (Fazaa') (2015)

== TV series ==
- ابيض واسود (Black and White) (1989)
- حلم الجنوبى (The Southern Dream) (1995)
- زيزينيا (Zizinia) (1997)
- فارس بلا جواد (A Knight Without a Horse) (2002)
- حدث فى الهرم (It Happened in the Pyramid) (2004)
- قيود من نار (Chains of Fire) (2007)
- بين السرايات ('Bin El Sarayat') (2015)
- الكبريت الاحمر (Red Sulfur) (2017)
- الكبريت الاحمر 2 (Red Sulfur 2)
- عصر الفرسان (The Era of the Knights)
- عائلة شمس (The Family of Shams)

== Plays ==
- لعبة الست (The Lady's Game) (2001)
- كارمن (Carmen) (1999)
- سكة السلامة (The Road of Peace) (2000)
- سيام سيام (Siam Siam)
