= Mohamed El Mazem =

Emirati singer

Mohamed El Mazem محمد المازم
- Born: 1 March 1971 (age 55); Emirate of Abu Dhabi
- Genres: Arabic music, Khaliji
- Occupation: Singer
- Years active: 1989–present

Mohamed El Mazem (Arabic: محمد المازم) is an Emirati singer.

== Early life ==
His debut album, "Habib who is not my heart adored", was released was in 1989. Currently, his discography spans 15 albums, mostly romantic songs.

He announced his retirement from singing and his focus on religious chants in 2007, but later returned to performing patriotic songs.

Mohammed Al-Mazem reversed his retirement in 2018 with the release of his single "Zuroof Al-Waqt" (Circumstances of Time).

== Discography ==
=== Albums ===
- Sweetheart of others, 1989
- Muhammad Al-Mazem 1990
- Muhammad Al-Mazem 1993
- Atheeb Lama, 1994
- Tanch 1995
- Fadec 1995
- Like Candles 1996
- Almazam 1998
- The look of the mazem 2000
- Ayoun Al-Mazem 2001
- I love you 2002
- Al-Mazam Candle, 2003
- Malik Albi, 2007

=== National songs ===
- Emirates of Arabism and generosity
- Operetta uniting the armed forces in Abu Dhabi
- Country of pride with the house band
- Operetta Loyalty and Belonging
- Fadetk our dear mother

== See also ==
- Hussain Al Jassmi
- Esther Eden
- Mehad Hamad
