= Amr Diab =

Egyptian singer and actor (born 1961)

- عمرو دياب
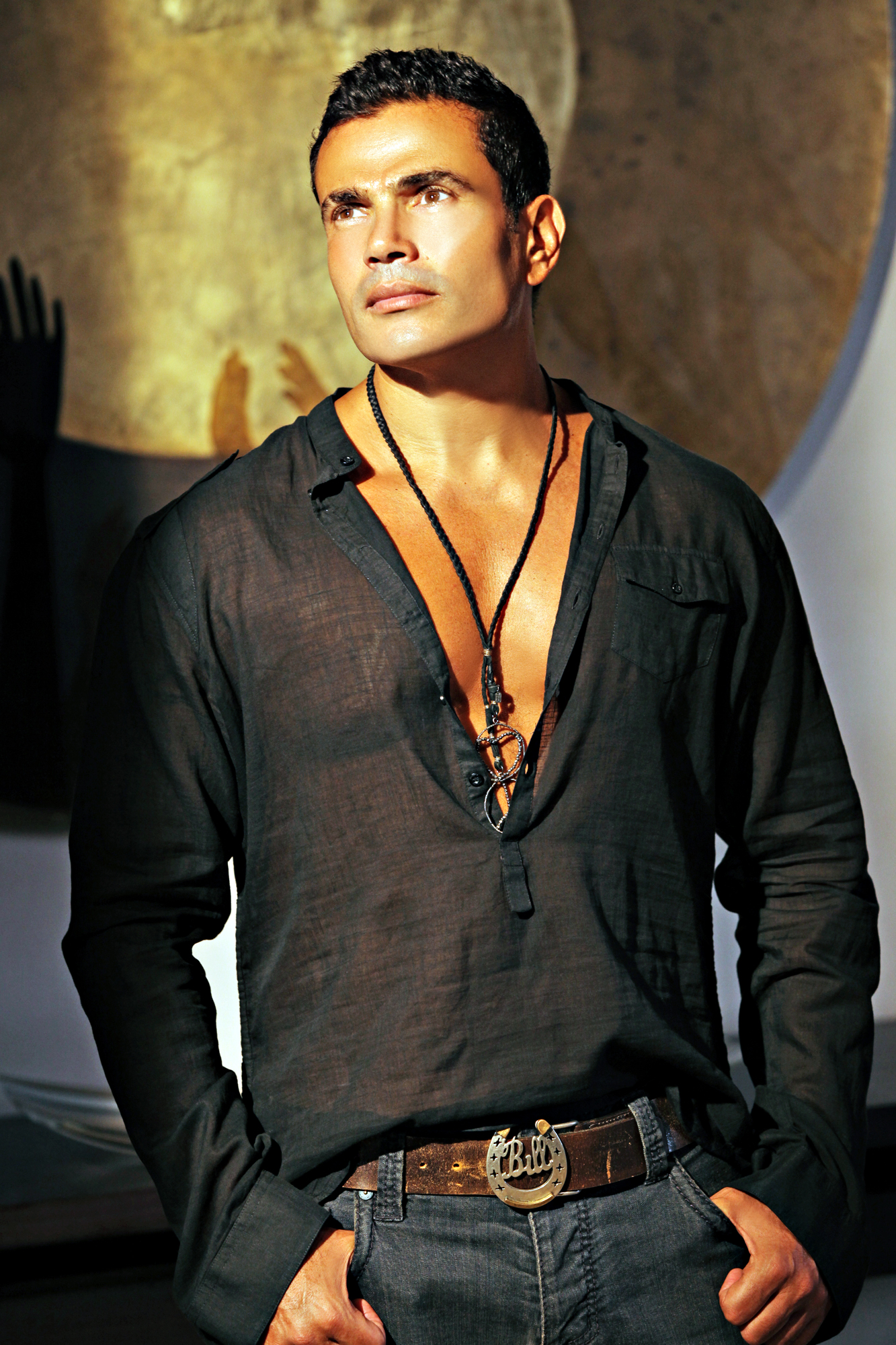
- Amr Diab in 2009
- Born: Amr Abdel Basset Abdel Azeez Diab عمرو عبد الباسط عبد العزيز دياب; 11 October 1961 (age 65); Port Said, Egypt
- Other names: El Hadaba ("The Plateau", "The Hill")
- Occupations: Singer; composer; actor
- Years active: 1983–present
- Spouses: Shereen Reda (m. 1989; div. 1992) Zeina Ashour (m. 1994; div. 2018) Dina El Sherbiny (m. 2018; sep. 2020)
- Children: 4
- Musical career
- Genres: Arabic pop; dance-pop
- Instruments: Vocals; guitar; oud; piano
- Labels: Delta Sound (1984–1998); Alam El Phan (1996–2003); Rotana (2004–2015); Nay for Media (2016–2024); Sony Music (2024–present)
- Website: amrdiab.net

Amr Abdel Basset Abdel Azeez Diab (Arabic: عمرو عبد الباسط عبد العزيز دياب, [ˈʕɑmɾe ʕæbdelˈbɑːsetˤ ʕæbdelʕæˈziːz deˈjæːb]; born 11 October 1961) is an Egyptian singer, composer and actor. He has established himself as a globally acclaimed recording artist and author. He is a Guinness World Record holder, the best selling Middle Eastern artist, a seven-times winner of World Music Awards and five-times winner of Platinum Records.

== Early life ==
Diab was born as Amr Abdel Basset Abdel Aziz Diab on 11 October 1961 in Port Said to a middle-class Egyptian Muslim family from the Nile Delta countryside of Menia Elamh in Sharqia Governorate. Diab graduated with a bachelor's degree in music from the Cairo Academy of Arts in 1986.

== Music career ==
Diab released his first album entitled Ya Tareeq (Oh Road) in 1983. Diab's second album, Ghanny Men Albak (Sing from your heart) (1984), was the first of a series of records he released with Delta Sound; including Hala Hala (1986), Khalseen (We're finished) (1987), and Mayyal (1988). His later releases include Shawa'na (1989), Matkhafesh (1990), Habibi (1991), Ayyamna (Our days) (1992), Ya Omrena (1993), Weylomony (1994), and Rag'een (1995).

By 1992, he became the first Egyptian and Middle Eastern artist to start making high-tech music videos.

In 1996, Diab released his first album with Alam El Phan entitled Nour El Ain, and he won the World Music Award for the first time, which proved an international success and gained Diab recognition beyond the Arabic-speaking world. Diab recorded four more albums with Alam El Phan, including Amarain (1999). Diab also collaborated with Khaled (on the song "Alby") and with Angela Dimitriou (on the song "Bahebak Aktar").

According to research by Michael Frishkopf, he has created a style in the song "Nour El Ain", termed as "Mediterranean music", a blend of Western and Middle Eastern/Egyptian rhythms.

In the summer of 2004, Diab, having left Alam El Phan, released his first album with Rotana Records, Leily Nahary, which he followed up with the hugely successful Kammel Kalamak (2005), and El Lilady (2007).

Wayah was released for sale on the internet on 27 June 2009; however, the album was leaked online and was downloaded illegally amid complaints of slow download speed on the official site. Diab's fans initiated a massive boycott of the sites with the illegal copies.

On 18 October 2009, Diab won four 2009 African Music Awards in the categories of best artist, album, vocalist and song for "Wayah"; Diab had been nominated by the Big Apple Music Awards.

In February 2011, Diab released his hit single "Masr Allet" ("Egypt spoke"), followed by the release of his album Banadeek Taala in September, produced by Rotana. In 2012, Diab hosted the first Google Hangout in the Middle East during his performance in Dubai. In October 2014, Diab released his album Shoft El Ayam, which topped his last album El Leila (2013) and again became the best-selling album in Egypt on iTunes and peaked at No. 1 on the Billboard World Albums Charts, making him the first Egyptian and Middle Eastern performer to accomplish such a feat. In July 2015, Diab released a music video for his song "Gamalo" from his album Shoft El Ayam. In March 2016, he released Ahla w Ahla, his first album since he left Rotana Music. The album was produced by the record label Nay For Media. His new album Maadi el Nas was released in July 2017 with Nay Records.

In October 2018, he released a new album called Kol Hayaty. In 2019, he released a mini-album, Ana Gheir, and in February 2020, he released his 30th album, Sahran, which included 16 songs. In the same year, Amr Diab released another album, Ya Ana Ya La, at the end of the year, 31 December 2020.

From April 2021 to July 2023, Amr Diab released a huge amount of singles, many of which topped the charts on digital listening platforms until his album release in 2023.

In February 2022, Anghami announced an exclusive partnership that will see the Diab's entire Nay Label audio and video catalogue and future releases available only on Anghami.

In December 2023, Amr Diab released an album called Makanak with 12 songs.

Then he released two singles called "El Kelma El Helwa", an advertisement for Vodafone Music (Egypt), and "Hekyatna Helwa" for Hyde Park, both on 11 March 2024.

In April 2024, Rolling Stone picked Tamally Maak to top the Best Arabic Pop Songs of the 21st Century. In July of that year, his exclusive contract with Anghami expired.

In 2024 Amr Diab won top male artist and top male artist in Egyptian dialect. Awarded by Billboard Arabia.

A program produced by Amr Afifi, consisting of 12 parts aired on Rotana Music, Rotana Cinema and Egyptian Channel 1 station. The program detailed the biography of Diab and was scheduled to be launched simultaneously with the release of Amr Diab's new album, but the album's release was postponed to a later date.

== Musical style ==
Diab is known as the "father of Mediterranean music". David Cooper and Kevin Dawe refer to his music as "the new breed of Mediterranean music". According to author Michael Frishkopf, Diab has produced a new concept of Mediterranean music, especially with his international hit, "Nour El Ain". Diab is known as a composer, having composed more than 97 of his own songs.

Diab is one of the first singers to popularize music videos in the whole MENA region and is the first Egyptian singer to appear in music videos.

== Film career ==
Diab's fame in the music industry has led him to experiment with other forms of media, such as film. Diab played himself in his first film, El Afareet, which was released in 1989. It also starred Madiha Kamel. His second film was Hussein El-Imam's production Ice Cream in Gleam (Ays Krim fi Glym), in which Diab starred in 1992, was chosen as one of the best five Egyptian musical films by the University of California, Los Angeles (ULCA) School of Theater, Film and Television. The film was featured in the UCLA Film and Television Archive's new program "Music on the Nile: Fifty Years of Egyptian Musical Films" at James Bridges Theater at UCLA on 6, 8 and 10 April 1999. David Chute of the LA Weekly termed it "observant" and "a big leap". His third movie was released in 1993, and was named Deahk We La'ab (Laughter and Fun). The film premiered in the Egyptian Film Festival in 1993. Diab played alongside international Egyptian movie star Omar Sharif (Lawrence of Arabia, Doctor Zhivago) and Yousra. Overall, Diab did not experience the same level of success in film that he had with his music career. Since 1993, Diab has focused on his singing career.

=== Amr Diab in movies ===
Diab's songs have been used in several films, including:

- "Wala Ala Baloh" in Divine Intervention (2002)
- "Awedouni" in The Dancer Upstairs (2002)
- "El Alem Alah" and "Nour El Ain" in O Clone (2001)
- "Nafs El Makan" in Double Whammy (2001)
- "Tamally Ma'ak" and "Nour El Ain" in Coco (2009)
- "Wala Ala Baloh" in The Dictator (2012)

== Personal life ==
Diab has an elder daughter from his first marriage to Egyptian actress Shereen Reda. In 1994, he was married to Saudi businesswoman Zeina Ashour. They have three children. In 2018, he went on to marry Egyptian actress, Dina El Sherbiny, .However Amr & Zeina Are not yet divorced still appearing together sometimes and visits his family in London.. However, Diab and El Sherbiny separated in late 2020.

=== Egyptian Uprising 2011 ===
During the 2011 uprising, some protesters criticized Diab for staying silent, and for fleeing Egypt for London. A few days after former President Hosni Mubarak stepped down, Diab composed and sang a memorial song, "Masr A'let" (Egypt Said), and released it in conjunction with a music video showing pictures of the martyrs who died in the uprising. He initiated a charity campaign "Masry Begad" ("Truly Egyptian"). His online radio station Diab FM often presents talks and discussions about what the Diab FM team can offer to the community as well as applying it practically by being present in different sites across Egypt with a new humanitarian project each week.

== Discography ==
=== Studio albums ===
Year	Original Title	Translation	Label
1983	Ya Tareeq	O Road	Sawt Al Madina
1984	Ghanni Min Albak	Sing From Your Heart	Delta Sound
1986	Hala Hala	Welcome Welcome	Delta Sound
1987	Khalseen	We're Done	Delta Sound
1988	Mayal	Leaning	Delta Sound
1989	Shawa'na	Make Us Miss You	Delta Sound
1990	Matkhafesh	Don't Be Afraid	Delta Sound
1991	Habibi	Baby	Delta Sound
1992	Ayamna	Our Days	Delta Sound
1993	Ya Omrena	O Our Life	Delta Sound
1994	We Yloumouni	Let Them Blame Me	Delta Sound
1995	Ragein	We're Coming Back	Delta Sound
1996	Nour El Ain	Light of the Eye	Alam El Phan
1998	Awedony	Made Me Used To You	Delta Sound
1999	Amarain	Two Moons	Alam El Phan
2000	Tamally Maak	Always With You	Alam El Phan
2001	Aktar Wahed	The One That Loves You The Most	Alam El Phan
2003	Allem Alby	Teach My Heart	Alam El Phan
2004	Lealy Nahary	Night and Day	Rotana
2005	Kammel Kalamak	Keep Talking	Rotana
2007	El Lilady	Tonight	Rotana
2009	Wayah	With Her	Rotana
2011	Banadeek Ta'ala	Come I'm Calling You	Rotana
2013	El Leila	This Night	Rotana
2014	Shoft El Ayam	I saw the days	Rotana
2016	Ahla W Ahla	Prettier and Prettier	Sony Music
2017	Meaddy El Nas	Greater than People	Sony Music
2018	Kol Hayaty	All My Life	Sony Music
2020	Sahran	Up All Night	Sony Music
2020	Ya Ana Ya La	Either Me or No One	Sony Music
2023	Makanak	Your Place	Sony Music
2025	Ebtadena	We Started	Sony Music
2026	Habeitek	I Loved You	Sony Music

=== Singles ===
Year	Original Title	Translation	Label
1999	Eleos - with Angela Dimitriou	Mercy	EMI
1999	Ana Mahma Kibirt	Whatever I Get Old, I Still Young	Alam El Phan
2000	El Quds De Aredna	Quds is Our "Arabs" Land	Rotana
2000	El Helm Da Helmena	This Dream is Ours	Rotana
2002	Bahebak Nefsi Aaolhalak	I Hope to Say I Love You	Alam El Phan
2003	Rouh Alby	Soul of My Heart	Alam El Phan
2005	Elly Beiny We Beinak	That Between You and Me	Rotana
2007	Allah Aliha	God Bless Her	Rotana
2008	Oldies Singles		Rotana
2009	Leh Youm Ma Abeltak	Why That Happened When I Met You?	Rotana
2009	Makontsh Nawy	I didn't intend to	Rotana
2010	Nokia 5800 Releases		Rotana
2010	Aslaha Betefre’a	It's different	Rotana
2011	Masr Alet	Egypt Said	Sony Music
2011	La' Yestaheil	She deserves	Rotana
2012	Fe Haga Feek	There's Something With You	Rotana
2012	We Redet	I'm Satisfied	Rotana
2012	Ayesh Maak	I Spend Days With You	Rotana
2013	Dawam El Haal	What Goes around Comes around	Rotana
2014	Mesh Kol Wahed	Not Everybody	Rotana
2014	Ya Hob Dawebna	Oh love, Melt us in you	Rotana
2015	Balash Teb'ed	Don't Go Far	Nay for Media
2016	Al Qahera - ft. Mohamed Mounir	Cairo	Nay for Media
2017	El Farha El Leila	The Joy is tonight	Nay for Media
2018	Bahebak Ana	Me, Love You	Nay for Media
2019	Maa'darsh Al Nesyan	I cannot afford to forget	Nay for Media
2019	Gamaa Habybak	Gather Your Loved Ones	Nay for Media
2019	Africa (2019 Edition)		Nay for Media
2019	Aha Gheir	I'm Different	Nay for Media
2020	Ya Baladna Ya Helwa	Our Country is Beautiful	Nay for Media
2020	Amaken El Sahar	Nightlife places	Nay for Media
2021	Inta El Haz	You're the Luck	Nay for Media
2022	El Ser	The Secret	Nay for Media
2023	Shokran Min Hena Le Bokra	Thank you from here on out	Nay for Media

=== Famous songs ===
Year	Original Title	Translation	Composers	Producers	Album
1984	Ghanni Min Albak	Sing From Your Heart	Hani Zaki, Azmi Al Kilany	Mohamed Helal	Ghanni Min Albak
1984	Ashof Ainaik	I See Your Eyes	Traditional, adaptation Issam Abdallah	Mohamed Helal	Ghanni Min Albak
1986	Hala Hala	Welcome Welcome	Magdi El Naggar, Amr Diab	Mohamed Helal	Hala Hala
1987	Khalseen	We're Done	Reda Ameen, Khalil Mostafa	Fathy Salama	Khalseen
1988	Mayal	Leaning	Magdi El Naggar, Haggag Abdel Rahman	Fathy Salama	Mayal
1989	Shawa'na	Make Us Miss You	Magdi El Naggar, Haggag Abdel Rahman	Hamid El Shaeri	Shawa'na
1990	Matkhafesh	Don't Be Afraid	Magdi El Naggar, Amr Diab	Hamid El Shaeri	Matkhafesh
1991	Aeh Pas Ille Ramak	What made you love?	Medhat El Adl, Amr Diab	Hossam Hosny	Habibi
1992	Ice Cream Fi Glym	Ice Cream in Glym	Medhat El Adl, Amr Diab	Hossam Hosny	Ice Cream in Glym
1992	Raseef Nemra Khamsa	Sidewalk Number Five	Medhat El Adl, Amr Diab	Hossam Hosny	Ice Cream in Glym
1992	Wehna Maak	We'll Sing With You	Medhat El Adl, Amr Diab	Hossam Hosny	Ice Cream in Glym
1992	El Mady	The Past	Magdi El Naggar, Abdel Azeez Al Nasir	Hamid El Shaeri	Ayamna
1993	Ya Omrena	Our Days Together	Magdi El Naggar, Amr Diab	Tarek Madkour	Ya Omrena
1994	Africa	Africa	Magdi El Naggar, Amr Diab	Modi El Emam	Zekrayat
1995	Ragein	We're Coming Back	Medhat El Adl, Reyad El Hamshari	Tarek Madkour	Ragein
1996	Nour El Ain	Light of the Eye	Ahmed Sheta, Nasser Al Mezdawy	Hamid El Shaeri	Nour El Ain
1998	Awedouny	Made Me Used to You	Abdel Monem Taha, Amr Tantawy	Hamid El Shaeri	Awedouny
1999	Alby (featuring Khaled)	My Heart	Magdi El Naggar, Amr Mahmoud	Farid Awamer	Amarain
1999	Amarain	Two Moons	Mohamed Refahey, Sherif Tag	Tarek Madkour	Amarain
1999	Bahebbak Aktar (featuring Angela Dimitriou)	I Love You More	Mohamed Refahy, Sherif Tag, Panos Falaras	Tarek Madkour	Amarain
2000	El Alem Allah	God Knows	Amir Teima, Amr Mostafa, Amr Diab	Tarek Madkour	Tamally Maak
2000	Tamally Maak	Always With You	Ahemd Ali Mousa, Sherif Tag	Tarek Madkour	Tamally Maak
2000	We Heya Amleh Eih	And How is She Doing	Bahaa El Din Mohamed, Essam Karika	Tarek Madkour	Tamally Maak
2001	Wala Ala Balo	Not On Her Mind	Mohamed Refahey, Mohamed Rahim	Tarek Madkour	Aktar Wahed
2001	Aktar Wahed	The One Who Loves You Most	Ahmed Ali Mousa, Amr Mostafa	Tarek Madkour	Aktar Wahed
2001	Kan Tayeb	He Was Good	Ayman Bahgat Kamar, Amr Diab	Tarek Madkour	Aktar Wahed
2001	Baed El Layaly	I Count The Nights	Mohamed Refahey, Khaled Ezz	Tarek Madkour	Aktar Wahed
2003	Allem Alby	Teach My Heart	Waleed Galal, Amr Diab, Khaled Ezz	Fahd	Allem Alby
2003	Ana Ayesh	I'm Alive	Rabea El Seuofey, Amr Diab, Amr Mostafa	Hani Yacoub	Allem Alby
2004	Lealy Nahary	Night and Day	Khaled Tag Eldeen, Amr Mostafa	Nader Hamdy	Lealy Nahary
2004	Qusad Einy	In front of My Eyes	Khaled Tag Eldeen, Amr Mostafa	Nader Hamdy	Lealy Nahary
2005	We Maloh	Why Not?	Khaled Tag Eldeen, Amr Mostafa	Tarek Madkour	Kammel Kalamak
2005	Kammel Kalamak	Keep Talking	Amir Teima, Nasser El Mezdawi	Tarek Madkour	Kammel Kalamak
2007	El Lilady	Tonight	Ayman Bahgat Kamar, Amr Mostafa	Hassan El Shafei	El Lilady
2007	Khalik Ma'aya	Stay With Me	Ayman Bahgat Kamar, Mohamed Yehia	Hassan El Shafei	El Lilady
2009	Wayah	With Her	Tamer Hussien, Amr Mostafa	Hassan El Shafei	Wayah
2009	Yehemak Fe Eih	What does it matter to you?	Ayman Bahgat Kamar, Mohamed Yehia	Hassan El Shafei	Wayah
2010	Aslaha Betifrek	It's Different	Magdy El Naggar, Amr Diab	Adel Hakki	Single Release
2011	Banadeek Taala	Come I'm Calling You	Tamer Hussien, Amr Diab	Adel Hakki	Banadeek Taala
2011	Ma'drrsh Ana	I Can't Handle	Tamer Hussien, Amr Tantawi	Adel Hakki	Banadeek Taala
2013	El Leila	This Night	Tamer Hussien, Amr Tantawi	Osama Elhendy	El Leila
2013	Sebt Faragh Kebeer	You've left a trail	Magdi El Naggar, Khalil Mostafa	Adel Hakki	El Leila
2014	Shoft El Ayam	Did You See the Days	Tamer Hussien, Shady Hassan	Adel Hakki	Shoft El Ayam
2014	Gamalo	Her Beauty	Tamer Hussien, Shady Hassan	Osama Elhendy	Shoft El Ayam
2016	Ragea	You're Back!	Tamer Hussien, Islam Zaki	Osama Elhendy	Ahla W Ahla
2016	Amentak	I have Placed a Trust in You	Tamer Hussien, Mohamed El Nady	Osama Elhendy	Ahla W Ahla
2017	Ya Agmal Eyoun	Most Beautiful Eyes	Turki Al Alsheikh, Amr Mostafa	Osama Elhendy	Meaddy El Nas
2018	Yetalemo	They Learn from You	Tamer Hussien, Amr Mostafa	Osama Elhendy	Kol Hayaty
2018	Da Law Etsab	If It Got Left	Ayman Bahgat Kamar, Mohamed Yehia	Osama Elhendy	Kol Hayaty
2019	Youm Talat	On Tuesday	Tamer Hussien, Aziz El Shafei	Osama Elhendy	Sahran
2019	Odam Merayetha	In Front of her Mirror	Tamer Hussien, Aziz El Shafei	Tarek Madkour	Sahran
2020	Zay Manty	You are as You are	Aziz El Shafei	Nader Hamdy	Sahran
2020	Ya Ana Ya La	Either Me or No One	Ayman Bahgat Kamar, Mohamed Yehia	Adel Hakki	Ya Ana Ya La
2020	Amaken El Sahar	Nightlife places	Tamer Hussien, Aziz El Shafei	Osama Elhendy	Single Release
2021	Inta El Haz	You're the Luck	Tamer Hussien, Aziz El Shafei	Wesam Adel Munem	Single Release
2021	Ray'a	When You're in the Mood	Ayman Bahgat Kamar, Mohamed Yehia	Tarek Madkour	Single Release
2022	Hatedalaa	You'll be spoiled	Mohamed El Kayaty, Mohamed Yehia	Ahmed Ibrahim	Single Release
2022	Elly Beina Hayah	What Between Us, is a Life	Aziz El Shafei	Wesam Abdel Munem	Single Release
2023	El Hafla	The Party	Ahmed Marzouk, Mohamed Kammah	Mohamed Kammah	Single Release
2023	Makanak	Your Place	Tamer Hussien, Amr Diab	Ahmed Ibrahim	Makanak
2023	Ya Amar	Oh Moon	Mostafa Hadouta, Amr Diab	Wesam Abdel Munem	Makanak

== Awards ==
He has been awarded the World Music Award for Best Selling Middle Eastern Artist four times: 1996 for album Nour El Ain, 2001 for album Akter Wahed, 2007 for album El Lillady and 2013 for El Leila album. He has also won (Best Egyptian Artist, Best Male Arab Artist and World's Best Arab Male Artist Voted Online) at the World Music Awards 2014. Amr Diab is the only Middle Eastern artist to have received 7 World Music Awards. Five of his albums reached the top 10 of Billboard's World Albums chart, with Shoft El Ayam reaching No. 1 in 2014, the first for an Arabic performer. Alongside that accomplishment, two of his albums (2014's Shoft El Ayam and 2016's Ahla w Ahla) both peaked at 29 and 14 respectively on Billboard's Heatseekers charts.

On 28 September 2016, Diab announced that he achieved a Guinness World Records title for "Most World Music Awards for Best Selling Middle Eastern Artist".

=== List of awards received by Amr Diab ===
- Seven World Music Awards (1997/2001/2007/2014)
- Six African Music Awards (2009/2010)
- Two All Africa Music Awards (2016/2017)
- Guinness World Record (2016)
- Joy Awards (KSA) (2019)
- 1 Billion streams on Anghami (2022)
- Rolling Stone: Tamally Ma'ak - Song of the century (2024)
- Top Male Artist - Billboard Arabia Music Awards (2024)
- Top Male Artist – Egyptian Dialect - BBAMAs (2024)
