= Nasser al-Mezdawi =

Libyan musician (born 1950)

Nasser al-Mezdawi ناصر المزداوي
- Born: Nasser Omar al-Mezdawi; 5 September 1950 (age 75); Mizda, Libya
- Occupations: Musician; songwriter
- Instruments: Vocals; guitar; oud; violin; piano
- Years active: 1967–present
- Formerly of: An-Nusour

Nasser Omar al-Mezdawi (also spelled el-Mizdawi, Arabic: ناصر عمر المزداوي; born 5 September 1950) is a Libyan musician and songwriter.

== Discography ==
- 2000 Wahdani
- 1997 Raja'a
- 1983 Angham libiya
- 1975 Ughniyat an El ghurba (Annusour)

== Biography ==
Mezdawi's first band Annusur, translates to The Eagles, released their first album "Ughniyat an Elghurba" in 1975 gaining instant popularity that rewarded them their first gold record. Mezdawi went on to participate in several international music festivals, giving concerts in Mexico, Cuba, USA, Portugal Malta and Greece. Nasser El Mezdawi is arguably the most popular artist that came out of Libya in the mid seventies. His work has been appreciated by the younger generation in urban North Africa and other Arab countries.

Other local artists have imitated his early work, and some began their careers by covering his songs. He is a guitarist, composer, and singer-songwriter who has worked continuously in the region's music industry.

Darja, the Arabic dialect of North Africa, is the lyrical language of this sound. While the music is not necessarily Arabic, the rhythms are often mixtures of Berber, Arab, African and popular European. Artists usually reflect their diverse ethnic backgrounds through their own distinguishable work. The progressive sound remained local for the most part but Mezdawi's music broke into the international market through other Arab and European performers.

Nasser El Mezdawi is a pioneer in this form of music whom, many believe, is responsible for transforming the way young, urban Arab performers view and express their music today. QTF-1998
