= Said El Artist =

Egyptian percussionist

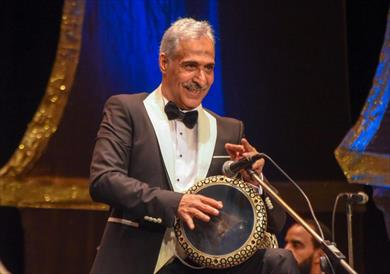

Said EL Artist is an Egyptian drummer/percussionist. He also has a line of signature drums - El Artist Drums. He played a huge role for taking Egyptian Shaabi music to be known worldwide and is most known for his release Spectacular Rhythms, on Hollywood Records, but is featured on many recordings.
