= Hamid Al Shaeri =

Libyan-Egyptian musician and singer

Hamid al-Shaeri حميد الشاعري
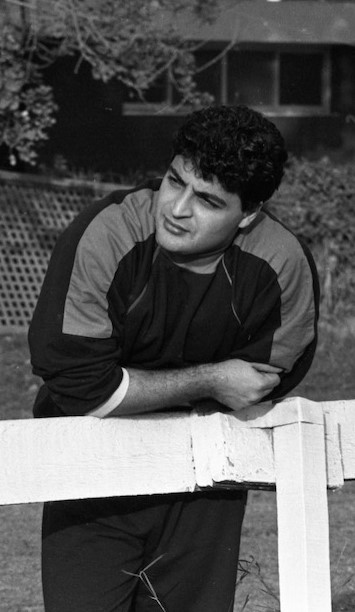

Background information
- Born: Abdelhamid Ali Ahmed al-Shaeri; 29 November 1961 (age 64); Benghazi, United Kingdom of Libya
- Genre: Arabic pop
- Occupations: Musician, Singer
- Years active: 1983-present
- Formerly of: Sons of Africa

Abdelhamid Ali Ahmed al-Shaeri (Arabic: عبد الحميد علي أحمد الشاعري, romanized: ʿAbd al-Ḥamīd ʿAlī Aḥmad ash-Shāʿirī; born 29 November 1961), better known as Hamid al-Shaeri (also al-Sha'eri and al-Sha'iri; Arabic: حميد الشاعري, romanized: Ḥamīd ash-Shāʿirī), is a Libyan-Egyptian singer, songwriter, and producer. He is considered one of the most influential figures in Arabic pop and has been credited for incorporating Western music styles of synth-pop, western dance, and rock and roll influences alongside traditional Arabic musical features, which came to be known as El Geel.

Born in Benghazi to an Libyan father and Egyptian mother, al-Shaeri first achieved fame in Libya as a founding member of the Sons of Africa during the 1970s, before he was forced to move to his maternal country Egypt, where he released his first album, Ayonha, in 1983. Initially unsuccessful, al-Shaeri received widespread critical and commercial acclaim with his second album, Raheel (1984). In addition to his solo work, al-Shaeri has also been noted for his work as producer, including the songs "Law Leki" (1988) performed by Ali Hemeida, and "Ainy" (1997), performed by Hisham Abbas.

== Early life ==
Al-Shaeri was born in 1961 in Benghazi to a Libyan father and an Egyptian mother. One of sixteen children, al-Shaeri was raised in a polygamous household; his mother died when he was 13. He briefly studied aviation in the United Kingdom, where he was first exposed to synth-pop, though his father originally forbade him from pursuing a career as a musician.

== Career ==
After returning to Libya, al-Shaeri briefly served as an organist in the Libyan Radio Band, before becoming a founding member of the Sons of Africa group, composed of Arab and African musicians, which found particular success within Libya. Al-Shaeri subsequently moved to Alexandria, Egypt, reportedly after witnessing the public burning of Western music instruments.

After moving from Alexandria to Cairo, al-Shaeri released his first album, Ayonha, in 1983. Composed of songs recorded during his time in Libya, the United Kingdom, and Egypt, the album found limited commercial and critical success during its initial release. Al-Shaeri's second album, Raheel (1984), received much more acclaim, in addition to it being a commercial success in Egypt.

In addition to his solo career, al-Shaeri also worked as a producer from the 1980s. His song "Law Leki" (1988), performed by Ali Hemeida, featured cymbals and drum machines alongside traditional Libyan clapping and cymbals; the song has since been called emblematic of the al-Jeel genre, which al-Shaeri spearheaded; the song's production techniques were described as "dominating" the next decade of Arabic pop music.

Outside of the Arab world, al-Shaeri received renewed attention in 2017 when his song "Ayonha" was featured on Habibi Funk's seventh compilation. American music website Pitchfork described the song as the "most exciting track" on the album. As a result of renewed interest in al-Shaeri's work, a 2022 compilation of his early songs, entitled The SLAM! Years (1983-1988), was released, also by Habibi Funk.

== Politics ==
Al-Shaeri was critical of Libyan leader Muammar Gaddafi, and following the outbreak of the First Libyan Civil War, he wrote several songs that were used by the Libyan opposition movement. He described Gaddafi as a "disgrace to Libyans", and called on Egyptians to support Libyan citizens.

== Criticism ==
Al-Shaeri faced criticism for "infringing" on Arabic culture and heritage. Egyptian composer Helmy Bakr accused al-Shaeri and other up and coming musicians at the time of tarnishing traditional Arabic music due to their lack of musical education. Al-Shaeri refuted this, stating his musical instinct was more important than his musical knowledge. Al-Shaeri and Bakr appeared to reconcile in 1998 when they both contributed to the so-called operetta "The Arab Dream".

== Discography ==
=== Solo albums ===
Year	Original Title	Translation	Label	Main Tracks
1983	Ayonha	Her Eyes	Slam!	Ayonha
1984	Raheel	Expat	Slam!	Raheel
1986	Akeed	For Sure	Slam!	Samra
1988	Janna	Paradise	Slam!	Janna
1988	Seneen	Years	Slam!	Seneen
1990	Hekaya	Story	El Sharq	Maganeen
1990	Shaabiyat Vol. 1	Popular Music Vol. 1	Sout El Hob	Ana Saber
1991	Shara	Badge	El Sharq	Jaljely
1991	Shaabiyat Vol. 2	Popular Music Vol. 2	Sout El Hob	Al Bahr
1991	Inta Al Nass Al Helo - with Shereen Wagdi	You're the Beautiful Story	Al Jazira	Inta Al Nass Al Helo
1991	Kawahel	Ankles	El Sharq	Kawahel
1991	Halaweit Zaman	Sweets From the Past	Rotana	Sawaah
1993	Lewin	Where to	High Quality	Lewin
1993	Hodoa Moakat	Temporary calm	High Quality	Gayez
1993	Ishr Al Bondok - Soundtrack from Khairy Beshara's Motion Picture	Hazlenut Peel	Mogiphone	Al Koha
1995	Sadeeq	Friend	Megastar	Kol Haga
1995	Wahashtina Ya Shadia	I Miss You Shadia	Sono Cairo	Asmarany Allon
1996	Halawtak Ya Fawzi	Sings Mohamed Fawzi	Sono Cairo	Fattouma
1996	Hayartouna	You Confused Us	Megastar	Boss Shouf
1997	Shaabiyat Vol. 3	Popular Music Vol. 3	Sout El Hob	Raksat Al Magnouna
1997	Ainy	My Eye	Alam El Phan	Ainy - with Hisham Abbas
1997	Ishtaknalkom	We Missed You	Megastar	Washrah Laha
1998	Tegannin Ya Farid	Sings Farid El Atrache	Megastar	Alby Wa Moftaho
1999	Bahebbik Ya Fairuz	Sings Fairuz	New Sound	Sa'alouni Annass
2000	Ghazaly	My Dear	Alam El Phan	Ghazaly - with Moustafa Amar
2006	Roh El Samara	Spirit of My Love	Alam El Phan	Roh El Samara

=== Collaborative work ===
Year	Original Title	Translation	Featured Singer	Label
1990	Betkalem Gad	I Speak the Truth	Simone	Americana
1990	Halal Alek	It's Your Fault	Hisham Abbas	Americana
1997	Ainy	My Eye	Hisham Abbas	Alam El Phan
1998	Kahil Eleain	Beautiful Eyes	Fares	High Quality
2000	Ghazaly	My Dear	Moustafa Amar	Alam El Phan
2006	Leish	Why	Dalinda	Mazzika
2020	Zahmet El Ayam	Busy Days	Hisham AbbasMoustafa AmarEhab Tawfik	Camp
2020	Ya Donia Dawara	The Round World	Youssef	Camp
2020	El Helween Bezyada	Enough Beautiful People	Joury	Camp

=== Producer credits ===
Year	Artist	Original Title	Translation	Label	Main Track
1986	Ahmed Mounib	Meshtakin	I Miss You	Rondo	Al Leila Ya Samra
1987	Lebleba	Bint Misr Al Gedida	The New Girl From Egypt	Alam El Phan	Bint Misr Al Gedida
1988	Ali Hamida	Lolaky	If It Weren't For You	El Sharq	Lolaky
1989	Amr Diab	Shawa'na	We Missed Each Other	Delta Sound	Shawa'na
1989	Randa	Meen Adda	Who's Good Enough	Audio Club	Damak T'eel
1989	Simone	Betkalem Gad	I Speak the Truth	Americana	Betkalem Gad
1990	Hanan	Ray'a	Calm	Slam!	Maak
1990	Amr Diab	Mayal	Leaning	Delta Sound	Meen Gherik
1990	Fares	Sehrak	Your Mystery	High Quality	Sehrak
1991	Simone	Allo		Delta Sound	Rekka
1991	Moustafa Amar	Wassaf	Describer	Slam!	Makateeby
1992	Moustafa Amar	Eskandarani	Born in Alexandria	Slam!	Eskandarani
1992	Amr Diab	Ayamna	Our Days	Delta Sound	El Madi
1992	Hisham Abbas	Hala	Situation	Americana	Halal Alek
1992	Ehab Tawfik	Rasamtek	I Drew You	Slam!	Amarna
1993	Hanan	Testahel	You Deserve It	Slam!	Testahel
1994	Hisham Abbas & Alia	Taala	Come	Americana	Wana Aamal Eh
1994	Amr Diab	We Yloumouni	And They Blame Me	Delta Sound	We Yloumouni
1994	Moustafa Amar	Seket El A'shi'n	Lovers Railway	Slam!	Bahebak
1995	Moustafa Amar	Eftekerni	Think of Me	Slam!	Elle Shabakni
1996	Hisham Abbas	Zay Al Awal	Like the First Time	Americana	Adik
1996	Amr Diab	Nour El Ain	Light of the Eye	Alam El Phan	Nour El Ain
1998	Amr Diab	Awedouny	Make Me Get Used to It	Alam El Phan	Awedouny
1998	Hisham Abbas	Ya Leila	Oh Night	Africana	Ya Leila
1998	Wael Kfoury	Shobbak Al Hob	Window of Love	Music Box	Kalb Wa Jorh Wa Chawk
1998	Fares	Tani	Again	High Quality	Tani
1999	Amr Diab	Amarain	Two Moons	Alam El Phan	Betwaheshny
1999	Moustafa Amar	Eineik Wahshany	I Miss Your Eyes	Founoon	Ah Min Khoudoudoh
2000	Hisham Abbas	Habibi Dah	That's My Love	Delta Sound	Mush Hayin Alaya
2004	Fadl Shaker	Saharny Al Shoq	Love Kept Me Awake	Rotana	Ya Habibi
