= Mazzika =

Recording Company

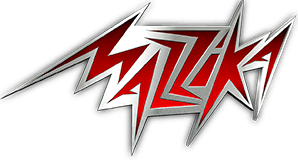
- Founded: 8 April 2003
- Founder: Mohsen Gaber
- Genre: Arabic music
- Location: Cairo, Egypt
- Official website: mazzikagroup.com

Mazzika Group (Egyptian Arabic: مزيكا, lit. 'Music') is a vertically integrated entertainment company founded in Egypt, focused on repackaging and distribution of Arabic content to Arabic-speaking communities and audiences interested in Arab-related content. It was formed in 8 April 2003 by Mohsen Gaber.

== Mazzika TV ==
Mazzika TV is a subsidiary of Mazzika Group and is managed by a team with over thirty years of experience in the music industry.

Egyptian Producer Mohsen Gaber launched the channels in April 2003 to distribute self-produced video clips and concerts.

== Catalogs ==
Following the sale and break-up of EMI in 2013, Mazzika acquired the entire catalogs of Alam El Phan, Soutelphan, Umm Kulthum, Abdel Halim Hafez, and Mohammed Abdel Wahab.
