= Amr Mostafa =

Egyptian singer and composer (born 1979)

Amr Mostafa عمرو مصطفى
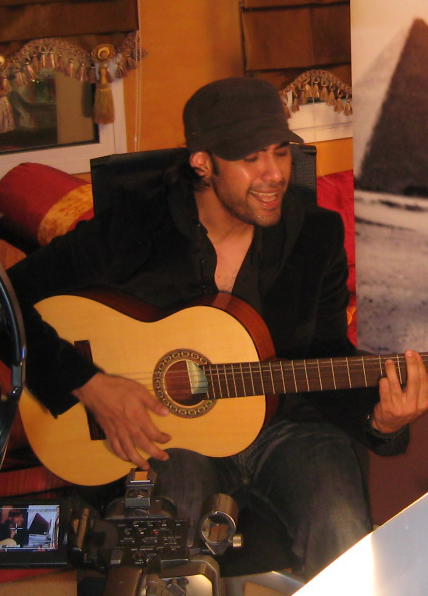
- Mostafa performing in Dubai, United Arab Emirates, in 2009

Background information
- Born: Amr Mostafa Mohamed Alsayed Abo Elmagd; 31 December 1977 (age 48)
- Origin: Cairo, Egypt
- Genres: Egyptian music, Arabic pop music
- Occupations: Singer, composer, musician
- Instrument: Guitar
- Years active: 1998–present
- Labels: EMI, Alam El Phan, Melody Music, Amr Mostafa Studio
- Website: amrmostafa.com

Amr Mostafa Mohamed Alsayed Abo elmagd (Arabic: عمرو مصطفى محمد السيد أبو المجد; born 31 December 1977), known professionally as Amr Mostafa (عمرو مصطفى), is an Egyptian singer and composer.

His professional career began in the late 1990s, was described by Billboard Arabia as a major figure in the history of Arabic music, and has composed more than 350 songs.

Many of which shaped Egyptian and Arab pop music and were later re-recorded in other languages.

His catalogue spans romantic and patriotic tracks, music for film and television, advertisement work, vocal releases, and international collaborations in Turkey, Spain, and Hungary.

His longest-running partnerships include work with Amr Diab, Samira Said, Mohamed Hamaki, and Nawal El Zoghbi.

He has also composed for Mohamed Mounir, Sherine Abdel Wahab, Assala, Ragheb Alama, Hussain Al Jassmi, Mostafa Amar, Hisham Abbas, Bahaa Sultan, Wael Jassar, Carole Samaha, Cheb Khaled and Cheb Mami, among others.

“ He composed hits such as "Ba'teref", "Ana Ayesh", "Aktar Wahed", "Leili Nehari", "We Malo", and "Ne'oul Eih" for Amr Diab. Amr also composed hits for Nawal Al Zoghbi ("Elli Tmanneito", "Be Einak", and "Rouhi Ya Rouhi"), Sherine Wagdy ("We Dah Yerdi Min", "Wala Leila"), Sherine ("Ma Fish Marra"), and Samira Said ("Awini Bik", "Youm Wara Youm", "Ma Khalas", "Bel Salama").”

Amr Mostafa has also released his own albums and is known for introducing innovative musical styles to the Egyptian music industry.

== Early life and career ==
Amr Mostafa's interest in composition developed at an early age and began composing melodies during his childhood, including setting Arabic poems from school textbooks to music. His talent became visible during his time at Cairo University in 1998. He was recognized by the university for his composition work and won a university-level composition title for a song about Palestine.

His professional breakthrough came in 1999 with “Khaleek Fakerny,” composed for Amr Diab.

Which was later celebrated for its 20th year since its release and has been identified as the work that introduced Amr Mostafa to the public as a composer.

Following this success, Mostafa established himself as a prominent composer in the Arab music scene, working with a wide range of artists.

He subsequently collaborated with numerous prominent Egyptian and Arab artists, including Mohamed Hamaki, Mostafa Amar, Mohamed Mounir, Hisham Abbas, Nawal El Zoghbi, Samira Said, Cheb Mami and others, as well as contributing to international projects in countries such as Turkey and Spain.

== Arab World Impact ==
Amr Mostafa has left an imprint in the Arab world's music industry, his tunes are heard throughout the region.

He worked with big names and helped them shape their sound from an earlier stage in their career.

=== Amr Diab ===
Mostafa's collaboration with Amr Diab became one of the main achievements of his career. It began with “Khaleek Fakerny” and continued through songs including "El Alem Allah" "Ba'eterif," "Aamel Eih," "Olt Eih," "Ana Aktar Wahed," "Ana Ayesh" "Leily Nahary," "Wahashtiny," "Qusad Einy," "We Malo," "El Lilady," "Neoul Eih" "Wayah" and "Yet'alemo" followed by "Ebtadeena" and "Khatfoony" when the partnership resumed in 2025.

In 2024, Billboard Arabia counted 43 collaborations ( starting with "Khaleek Fakerni" in the 1999 Album "Qamarein'' up until the 2020 Album "Sahran" ) with Amr Diab stating that Amr Mostafa had supplied more hit compositions to Diab than any other composer.

Resuming later within the 2025 Album "Ebtadena", Mostafa Composed the Title Track "Ebtadena" and "Khatafoony" which later won Amr Diab the Alamein music Festival award where he thanked Amr Mostafa for his contribution on "Khatafoony", which also won Amr Mostafa the MIMA music award for Best Composer in 2025, Sharing the award with Amr Diab as a shared success between the two.

Their work together resumed in the 2026 Album "Habeitak", with the title track, "Eta’akhar Etabna" and " Ana Maak" being composed by Amr Mostafa

His work contributed to Amr Diab breaking the Guinness world record for most world music award wins in 2016, Then being recognized again in 2026 for most weeks as number 1 on Billboard Arabia's top 100 chart .

=== Mohamed Hamaki ===
The pair have been working together since 2003, on albums, singles, commercial work, patriotic songs and special event recordings. Hamaki stated in 2026 that he has sung 40 songs of Amr Mostafa's composition and an earlier billboard Arabia interview counted 35 songs for the pair.

Major titles include "khaleena ne'eesh", "Ahla Haga Feeki", "kan w kan", " Agmal youm" , "Mel bedaya", "Odam elnas", "Baeit maah"

Hamaki went on to receive awards for works composed by Amr Mostafa such as "Ahla Haga Feeki" in 2007, Platinum award for achieving the highest sales with the Album "Khelis el Kalam" which contained 2 songs; "Ba'et aada" and "Ahla haga fiki" composed by Amr Mostafa.

In 2026, Mostafa composed seven tracks on Hamaki's album Sammaouny, including its title track, "Bahareya" , "Hely Hely", "Aalo anni eih"

Amr Mostafa's work on Mohammed Hamaki's Album "Sammaouny" contributed to the album topping Billboard Arabia's top 100 artists and Hot 100 charts in 2026 . The Album was exclusively released to Anghami which generated 15 million streams within days of its release. Was named as one of the biggest music moments on 2026 by Anghami.

Hamaki Held 18 of the 20 spots of the Top 20 Anghami chart with the Album " Sammaouny"

=== Samira Said ===
One of Samira said's most memorable songs was composed by Amr Mostafa, The song was a Duet between Samira Said and the Algerian singer cheb Mami. The song was released within Said's 2002 Album under the name "Youm Wara Youm".The Song was associated with Said's 2003 World Music Award, and she also won the Middle East and North Africa category at the 2003 BBC Radio 3 Awards for World Music.

Their work together continued on the 2004 album "Aweeny Beek" where he composed three songs on the album; The title track, "Bel Salama Bel Salama" and "Saab Alaya".

Their collaboration resumed in 2008 with the song "Nefsy Atkalem" from the album "Ayaam Hayaty" and again in 2023 with the song "Zann", in 2024 with 2 singles "Kan" and "Fan el Taghafol". among other projects together.

Arab Pop Work

During the same period, Mostafa composed for a broad group of Egyptian and Arab performers. including Sherine Abdel Wahab's “Mashrebtesh Men Nilha;” An Egyptian patriotic song. Ragheb Alama's “Saharouni El Leil,” Mohamed Hamaki's “Ahla Haga Feeki,” Nawal El Zoghbi's “El Nas El Ozaz,” and Hussain Al Jassmi's “Boshret Kheir;” Another major patriotic Egyptian song which later went on to being one of Amr Mostafa's biggest successes being a regional phenomenon, not just an Egyptian hit

== Patriotic work ==
Amr Mostafa has been known to contribute to his country through music, he has composed over 40 songs throughout the years for Egypt.

Bushret Kheir

Songs including but not limited to : "Mashrebtish mn Nelha" , "Alemoona f madrasetna", which is sung alongside the national anthem in Egyptian schools. "Tahya Masr " which was composed and performed nationally for the new Suez Canal opening ceremony. "Ya Masriyeen" performed by singer Amal Maher , ''Taeeshy Ya Masr W Teslamy'' sung by Bahaa Sultan.

in 2014, Amr mostafa presented the Arab world with "Bushret Kheir" , The song was a major success and was performed by big name "Hussain Al Jassmi".The song went on to being a regional phenomenon and not just an Egyptian hit.

“The video for “Boshret Kheir” was widely popular, not just in Egypt, but throughout the Middle East. Covers of the song were made in Syria, Lebanon, Jordan, and Palestine. On the first day it was released, it received over five million views on YouTube, and as of December 2015, the video had received more than 125 million views. As of January 2019, it had received more than 348 million views. The video also inspired many national and international parodies and remixes. To this day, the song is frequently played in Egypt and across the region on celebratory or festive occasions”

In December 2016, Egyptian President Abdel Fattah el-Sisi honored Amr Mostafa during the first Youth conference for his patriotic work.

== International impact ==
Amr Mostafa's musical compositions have reached international audiences, with his work extending beyond the Arab world into European markets such as Spain.

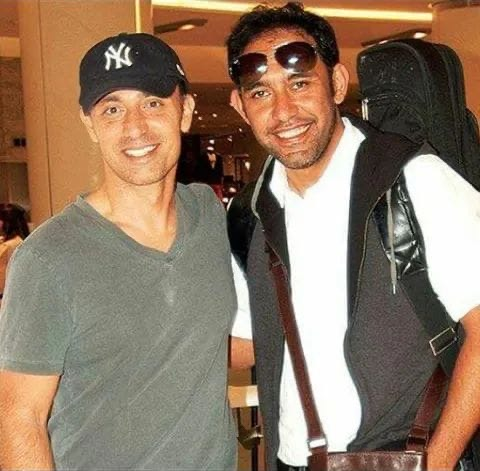
Amr Mostafa with Mustafa Sandal, 2010

Amr Mostafa has collaborated with international artists, including Turkish singer Mustafa Sandal. He composed the song "Sikir Sikir", which was performed by Mustafa Sandal and gained popularity in Turkey.

The song has had 133,253 downloads, making it the country's top-selling digital song of 2011, and received a MÜYAP Digital Sales Award at the 2012 Kral Music Awards.

In 2003, The Greek singer Kaiti Garbi released “Ilios I Vrohi'', An adaptation of Amr Mostafa and Samira Saied's "Youm Wara Youm"

Again in the same year, Greek Singer Giorgos Lempesis released ''To Ksero Oti M' Agapas'', which was a cover of Amr Mostafa and Samira said's song "Allah Yesahilak" which was released in 2002.

A Russian Musical group; FM, released a song in 2003 which was a Russian adaptation of Amr Diab's "Osad Einy" which was composed by Amr Mostafa.

Amr also worked with the Azerbaijani pop singer Zarina in 2011, on the title track of her Album "Delilik" and with the Turkish singer Ebru Gundes on her single "Hayatta Basarilar Diliyorum" which was released in his early years back in 2006.

in 2006, Turkish singer Hakan Peker released an adaptation of "Allah La Yehremni mennak" by Amr Diab, From Amr Mostafa's tunes as well, the song was released under the name “Gel Otur Şöyle”.

In Spain, Mostafa and Raquel Camins released “Awal Maawal (Cómo Decir).”

With Hungarian singer Pflum Orsi, his duet "Law Fi Hayati" (In My Life) with Pflum is considered an example of Arabic–international musical collaboration, blending different languages and musical styles.

In 2008, Amr Mostafa released the album "Alama Fi Hayatak", which involved collaboration with international music arrangers and was recorded in countries including Spain, Turkey, and Hungary.

Turkish singer "Atiye" released "Salla" in 2009 which also was a licensed adaptation of Mohammed Hamaki's "Ahla haga feeki" which is also one of Mostafa's compositions.

"Efsanem Olacaksın" by Burak Kut was released also in 2009 which adapts Amr Mostafa's composition of "Osad Ainy" by Amr Diab. "You can find Amr Mostafa listed with the spelling (Omru Musthafa) which is the Turkish pronunciation for his name)."

Enigma reported that he was then working with the Swedish pop music group Ace of Base on a comeback project in 2010.

In 2013, Amr Mostafa worked with Turkish singer Ayse Hatun Onal on "Selam Dengesiz şarkı sözleri"

In 2019, Amr Mostafa collaborated with Dj Marshmello on Amr Diab's "Bayen Habeit", bringing out a phenomenal Arab and EDM mixture of cultures.

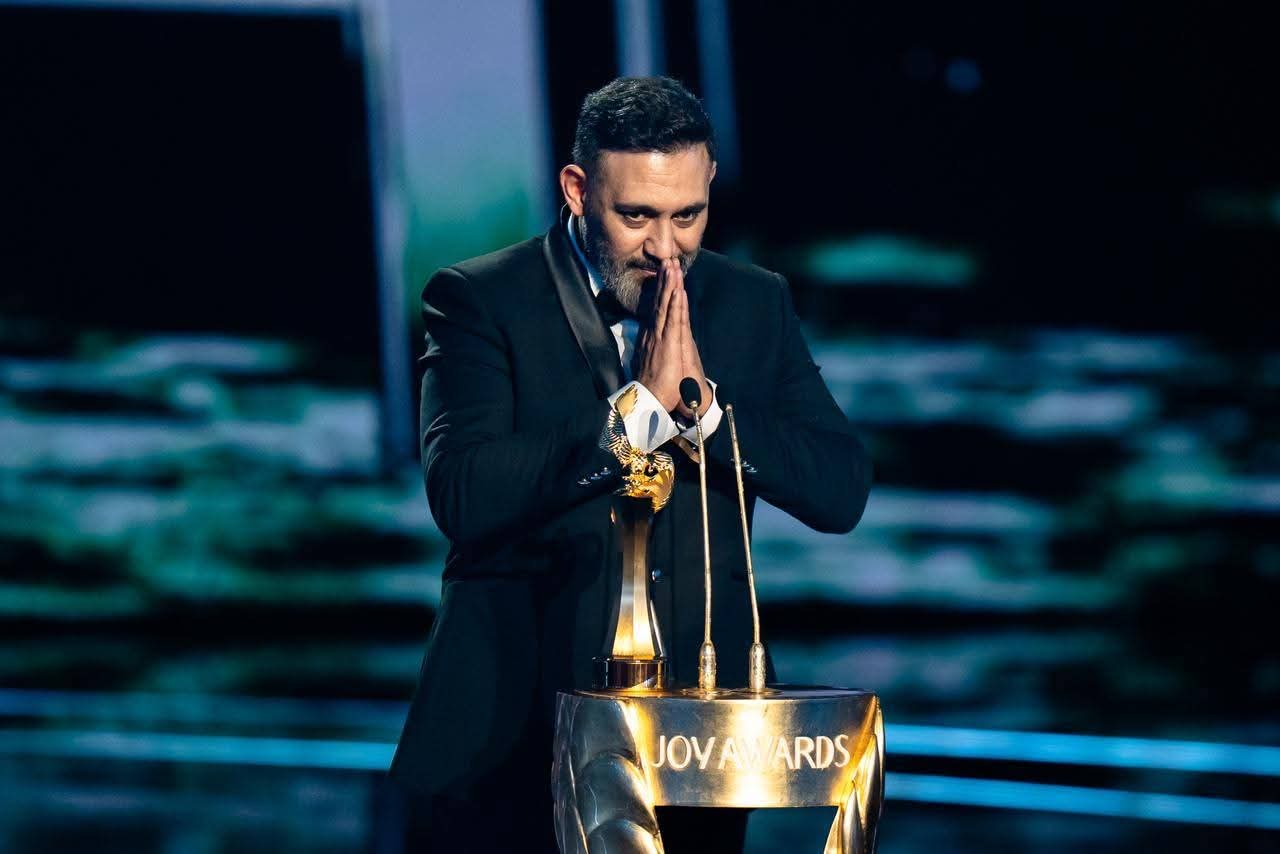
Amr Mostafa receiving a Joy Award in Riyadh, 2026

== Awards and Recognitions ==
- 2026; - DearGuest Award for Best Composer - Honorary entertainment makers Award, Joy Awards
- 2025 - The Best Award for Best composer - Best Composer Award at the MIMA music awards
- 2022 - Awarded Best Arab Singer by Egyptian ministry of culture and the Arab producers Union.
- 2019 - Best Composer at the DearGuest Award.
- 2018 - Best Composer at The MIMA music awards.
- 2016 - Presidential recognition, Egyptian president Abdel fattah Al-Sisi honored Amr Mostafa for his patriotic work through music compositions. - Best Composer at the middle east radio awards
- 2015 - Received the DearGuest Special award for his role in the music industry.
- 2008 - Best selling Album at The EMI awards for his Album "Alama fi Hayatak"

== Discography ==
=== Mohamed Hamaki ===
An El Awan

Khalina Ne'esh

Ahla Haga Feeki

Ba'et Aada

Nefsi Ab'a Gamboh

Gara Eh

Agmal Youm

Kan W Kan

Omro Ma Yegheeb

Neseet

Mainey

Elly Ekhtaro Alby

El Ghali Nasiny

Yezalzel

Kefaya Holoul Wasat

Khodny Eleik

Ba'et Maah

Odam El Nas

Men El Bedaya

Aash Men Shafak

Qadreen Naamelha

Tek

Ayezak Tesmaany

Hayatak Fe Soura

W Da Wa'to

Alby Habbak Gedan

Leilet El Omr

Howa Da Habiby

Samaony

Betes'alony Leh

Meshety

Aalo Any Eh

Hely Hely

Khalina

Habetak Be Hayaty

Keberty Qawam

Ella olily

El Hekaya Hekayetna

=== Amr Diab ===
Khaleek Fakerny

Baaterif

Amel Eh

El Alem Allah

Ya Habiby La

Ahebbak Akarhak

Sada'ny Khalas

Qolt Eh

Ana Aktar Wahed Beyhebbak

Kolhom

Ana Ayesh

Qosad Ainy

Elahy

Wahashtiny

Leily Nahary

Betkhaby Leh

Odam Oyounak

Allah La Yehremny Menak

W Maloh

W Fehemt Einaik

El Leila Di

Neqol Eh

Ainy W Ana Shayfoh

Allah Ala Hobbak Enta

Ba'addem Alby

Wayah

Makontesh Nawy

Sebtak

Rouh Alby

Wahyat Einyak

Hala Hala

Alby Etmannah

Ya Agmal Oyoun

El Farha El Leila

Ya Saher

Bayen Habet

Taala

Malak El Hosn

Yet'allemo

W Bahebbak Ana

Ma'darsh Ala El Nesyan

Halawet El Bedayat

Hay'eish Yeftekrny

Gamda Bas

Ebtadena

Khatafouny

Naqsaak El aada

Aktar W Aktar

Aktar Had Yefarahny

Habetak

E'takhar Etabna

Ana Ma'ak

Hala Hala

Bahebbak Ana

=== Samira Said ===
Youm Wara Youm

Meshta'alak

Allah Yesahellak

La Beena Helm

Kol El Aw'at

Layaly Zaman

Belsalama Belsalama

Saab Alaya

Qawiny Beek

Kolena Ensan

Nefsy Atkalem

Sha'et El Zorouf

W Ana Maak

Kefaya Keda

Ma Khalas

Zan

Ayez Eh Menni

Belsalama Ya Habiby

Kol El Awqat Benadilak

=== Nawal El Zoghbi ===
El Nas El ozaz

Lessa Bagi Ala Balk

Keda Bye Bye

Gowa Albo

Mesh Khayfa

Kam Leila

Habetoh Seneen Towal

Ala Feen

Tool Omry

Elly Etmanneto

Gheeb An ennaya

Ya Habiby Ana

Rouhy Ya Rouhy

Be Einyak

Khod Alby

=== Tamer Hosny ===
Elly Rah

Ya Khosartna

Ba'eesh Ala El Zekra

Bent Meen

Ayezak Tew'edyny

Enta Aqwa

=== Mostafa Amar ===
Habeet

Monaya

Meen Gherak

Habib Hayaty

Ana Bardoh Elly Feen

Law Kont Ghali Aleik

Ha'ollak Eh

Lessa Habayeb

Rah W Ghab Alaya

W Ana Leh

Geetlak

Rouhy Feek

Hen Ya

=== Amer Mounib ===
Aamel Eh Fe Hayatak

Hazzy Men El Sama

Geet Ala Baly

W Ba'oul

Eineyk Alet

Men Gher Lo'ak

Habeet Layalik

=== Sherine ===
Rouh Ensan

Eshra W Meshwar

Fi Leila

Ma Shrebtish Men Nilha

Mafeesh Marra

Tammen Alby

Enta Akher Wahed

Masr El Gameela

Ghalya Aleina Baladna

Gonodna Regala

Balady with Mohammed Nour

Masr Baqya Lelabad

Advertisement for 500500 hospital

=== Sherine Wagdy ===
Law Benna Eh

Wodeeny

Wala Leila

Lafeit Belad

W Da Yerdy Meen

Es'aly

El Leila Benna

Aysha Ala El Ayam

Hatb'ed

Ya Na Ya Na

Aleik Hagat

Aal Ana Fakra

Donia Tanya

=== WAMA ===
Rayha Gaya

Ala Tool Bes'al Aleih

Ya Ghali Alaya

=== Ramy Gamal ===
Beteftekriny

Shayef Eh

Eh Elly Gabak

=== Hossam Habib ===
Fi Ghamdet Ein

Agmal Qesset Hobb

Alby Sa'alny Aleik

Za'lan

Leila

Enta Maaya

Law Kenna Benhebha with Al Magmou'a

Ard El Salam

=== Donia Samir Ghanem ===
Mesh Qadra Asaddaq Einaya

Yama Nefsy A'ollak

Helly Ya Farha Helly

Erqosouloh

Songs from ''Aysha El Door'' series

Songs of "Gat Selima" series

=== Tamer Ashour ===
Entaq Ba'a

Wosoly

=== Hamid Al Shaeri ===
A'a'bal Ashan Elly Bahebbo

Bagheer Aleiky

Akher Sabrak Ya Alby

Efham Ba'a

=== Ehab Tawfik ===
Helly Ya Farha Helly

Leilaty

'ool Keda

Kam Youm

=== Bahaa Sultan ===
Ta'ala

Fi Dahrak

Segara

=== Rashed Al Majed ===
Aktar Shakhs Bel Donia

Law Kan Bekhatry With Amaal Maher

=== Hatem Fahmy ===
Beydok Alby

=== Ahmed El Sherif ===
Einy Fi Einak

=== Abdelfattah Gerini ===
Baheb Ashofak

=== Mina Atta and Mohamed Shahin ===
Ana El Saheb

=== Gamal Yassin ===
Ana Mestanny Aleik

=== Ahmed Khalil ===
Kanet Ayam

=== Ewan ===
Wahyat El Hobb

=== Samo Zain ===
Habetak

=== Ahmed Zaeem ===
Aho Aho

Marra Fi Marra

Aelat Zezo

=== Mohamed Khairy ===
Ala Eh Ba'a

=== Ahmed El Shamy ===
Ana Bahebbak

=== Diab ===
Ya Nasiny

=== Mohamed Attia ===
Leh

=== Mai Kassab ===
Tetool El Gheiba

=== Swar ===
Yama Aaloo

=== Nicole Saba ===
Ya Shaghelny Beek

W Heleftelak Bel Ghali

Qarrart

=== Rania Kurdy ===
Kalemtak Keteer

Shayef Nefsak

Esfaly

Malak Zai

=== Soma ===
Elly Ghadar Beyya

Dehket Leya Seniny

=== Shaza ===
El Layaly

Bergaa Be Omry

Nasyah Rouhy

Yalla Ya Masry

=== Randa Hafez ===
Ya Alby Ertah

Masebtelush Forsa

=== Sandy ===
Malosh Kelma

=== Sofia Marikh ===
Baheb Feek

=== Haifa Wehbe ===
Ya Habiby Ana

Bahebbak Hobb

=== Maya Nasry ===
Makan Fi El Alb

Law Kan Lak Alb

=== Laura Rahal ===
Men Kol Alby

=== Heba ===
Akher Wahed

Elly Ramany

=== Nihal Nabil ===
W Baeesh Awqat

Bent Masr

=== Bushra ===
Howa Meen

El Qatel El Mogrem

=== Rana Samaha ===
Boss Fi Wara'tak

=== Ghada Ragab ===
Naweyalak

Nazareyet El Guafa

=== Yasmin Ali ===
Etfa'alo Bel Kheir

=== Fares ===
Leily Wah

Etkallem

Ehlef Bellah

Taaraf

Beyhebbny Wala

Leila

Wahashtiny

Delwa'ty Bas Ana Baaterif

Benhebb Baad

Hobb W Shawq

=== Yuri Mrakadi ===
Bahebbak Moot

=== Hisham Abbas ===
Eftakaretny

Eftah Albak

Qol Alaya Magnoun

Amalty Eh

Sebha Tehebbak

Meen Elly Gowa Fi Alby

Qolt Eh

Habibak Ana

Wallah Ma Hakallemha

Wailah

Reeh El Madam Series song

Ard El Nefaq Series Song

=== Ahmed El Attar ===
Andy Bel Donia

Maghroura

Eddy Alby

Elly Yet'al

=== Medhat Saleh ===
Gai Ala Nafsak Leh

Dayman Ala Baly

Eh El Gamal Da

Masr Gaya

Mansoreen

=== Wael Jassar ===
Ban Aleik

=== Rola ===
Ala Da El Hal

Men Kol El Alam

=== Fadel Shaker ===
Ma Khalas

Shebe'na Men El Tamseel

=== Amal Maher ===
Toba Foq Toba

Ya Masryeen

Bent Men El Banat

Law Kan Bekhatry Ana with Rashed Al Majed

Botolat

Ediny Forsa

Asl El Ehsas

Albak Kbeer

Agmal Hobb

Hekaya Te'esh

Ma Khalas

=== Ragheb Alama ===
Sahharony El Leil

Madinaty advertisement song "El Hayah Ala Osoulha"

=== Assala ===
Arod Leh

Awez El Haq

Madinaty Madinaty - Madinaty advertisement

Khetwet El Kheir Advertisement - 500 500 hospital

Efraah W Eesh - 500 500 hospital

=== Mohamed Mounir ===
Abky

Banat

Alashan Yeshbahlek

Habibty Ya Om El Donia - Ya Aghla el Awtan

Motahayezz

Fadel Takka

Been Reesha Amala W Reesha Batala - Agricultural bank of Egypt

Salouga advertisement

Enta Aqwa - with Al magmou'a

=== Hussein Al Jassmi ===
Boshret Kheir

Rasamnalk

Ma Tekhafoush Ala Masr

Hala Hala

=== Cheb Khaled ===
Thank You Mr President

Long Live Egypt

=== Cheb Mami ===
Youm Wara Youm

=== Mustafa Sandal ===
Sikir Sikir

El Kbeer Kbeer

Organic

=== Orsi Pflum ===
Law Fi Hayaty

Thousands of Miles

=== Raquel Camins ===
International collaboration

=== Amr Mostafa ===
Ayamy

Alama Fi Hayaty

El Kbeer Kbeer

Qabeltak

Ghalta Omry

Kanet Ayam

Habetaha

El Leila

Baqya Ya Masr

Erhab

Rahty Ganbak

Mahadesh Aghla Men Balady

Hayyou El Alam

Shareeky

Soret El Rahman

Talaat Harb Rage'

Hayyouhom Fein Ma Kontom

Halawet El Donia

Masr W El Sudan

Laabet Ma El Asad

Gahda

Mayhemmneesh

Aseeb Ma Etasabsh

Mafeesh Ghairy

Ostoura

Ghadara

Esmaa El Kalam

Salma

Hatwaheshna

Taala Masr

Ya Masr Ma Tekhafish

Watan

Masr El Naharda

Fi Sheraa Meen

Ashanak Enty

Molook

Ya Masr Oomy

Btefarag El Nas

Law Kol Masry

Quran Kareem

Sabah El Kheir Ya Masr

Efraah

Khetwet El Kheir

=== Collective Works and National Projects ===
Loulouet El Khalij

Tahiyaty

Ajyal Betsallem Ajyal

Kolena Ensan

Law Konna Benhebha

Botolat

Rayha Gaya

Hayatak Fi Soura

W Da Wato

Qadreen Naamelha

Halawet El Donia

Madinaty

Hayah Ala Osoulha

Khetwet El Kheir

Efraah W Eesh

Been Reesha Amala W Reesha Batala

Salouga adv.

Coca-Cola adv.

Heya Di Masr

Tahya Gomhoreyet Masr

Tahya Masr

Masr Elly Begad

Taazim Salam

El Shaab El Aseel

Ajyal

Benaashaqha

Bena Tahya Masr

Olo El Ealam

Shabab El Donia

Ahmy Shaabak

Masr Meftah El Hayah

Men Kol Makan

Ard El Salam

Sonaa El Amal

Ommy Ya Nour Beitna

Adyaet Qanat El Nas

Adya Dineya

Soret El Rahman

Ahlam Shahrazad

Donia Tanya

Nazareyet El Guafa

Reeh El Madam

Ard El Nefaq

Serr Alany

Viva Atata

Wesh Tany

El Khoroug

Fawq Mostawa El Shobohat

Ard El Nefaq

Reeh El Madam

Taqdar

Aysha El Door

Get Selima

Ahlan Ramadan

Film El Dassas

Kabous

Al Qatel El Mogrem

=== International and Foreign Language Works ===
==== Mustafa Sandal ====
Sikir Sikir

Organic

==== Orsi Pflum ====
Law Fi Hayaty

Thousands of Miles

==== Raquel Camins ====
International collaboration

==== Cheb Khaled ====
Thank You Mr President

Long Live Egypt

==== Cheb Mami ====
Youm Wara Youm

International versions

Awel Ma Aoul

Spanish version

International adaptations

El Aalem Allah

Leily Nahary

Works adapted or translated into Turkish, Spanish, French, Greek, Bulgarian, Swedish, German, Persian, Urdu, Hindi, Hungarian, Italian and Russian
