= Alam El Phan =

Egyptian record label

- Founder: Mohsen Gaber
- Genre: Egyptian Music
- Location: Cairo, Egypt
- Official website: mazzikagroup.com

Alam el Phan (Arabic: عالم الفن, lit. 'The World of Art') is an Egyptian media group based in Cairo that supervises, manages, and produces Arabic music records and motion pictures. The company also runs the record label and TV station Mazzika.

== Artists ==
List of notable artists who have recorded for company, including former artists and those who have died:

A

- Abdel Halim Hafez
- Ahlam
- Amal Maher
- Amr Diab
- Amr Mostafa
- Angham
- Asalah
- Aziza Jalal

B

- Bia Mustafa Alloush

D

- Diana Haddad
- Diana Karazon

E

- Ehab Tawfik
- Elissa

F

- Fahd Ballan
- Farid al-Atrash
- Fayza Ahmed

H

- Haifa Wehbe
- Hani Shaker
- Hisham Abbas

I

- Issam Rajji

L

- Latifa

M

- Mai Selim
- May Hariri
- Melissa
- Mostafa Amar

N

- Nora Bo Awadh
- Nawal Al Zoghbi

R

- Ragheb Alama

S

- Shahad Alzahrani
- Sabah
- Samira Said
- Suzanne Tamim

T

- Tamer Hosny

U

- Umm Kulthum

W

- Wael Jassar
- Warda Al-Jazairia

== See also ==
- Lists of record labels
