= Fan translation =

Unofficial translations made by fans

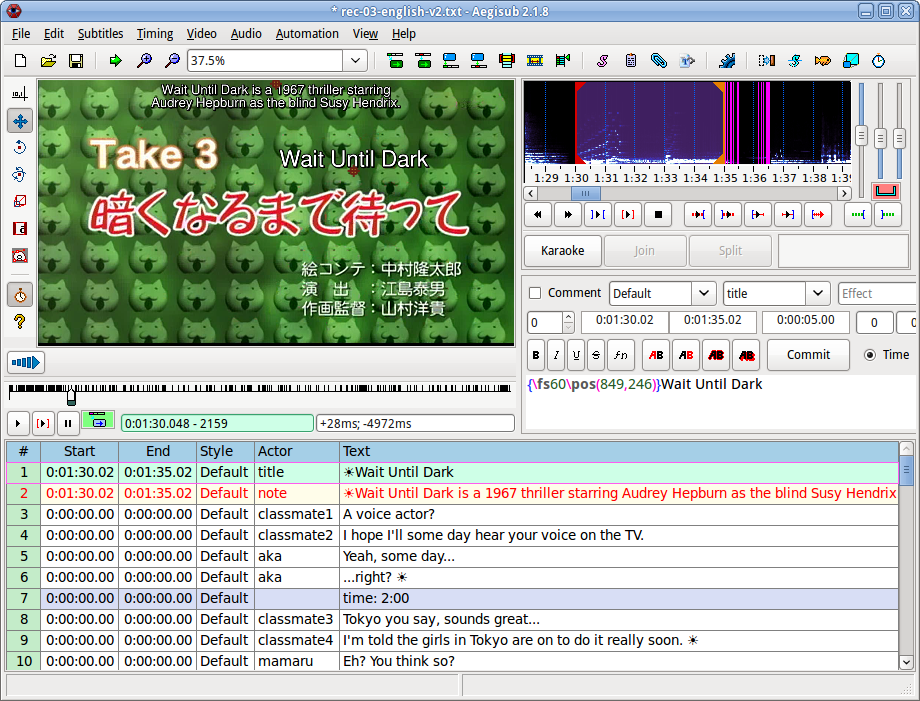
Screenshot of Aegisub

Fan translation (or user-generated translation) is the unofficial translation of various forms of written or multimedia products made by fans (fan labor), often into a language in which an official translated version is not yet available. Generally, fans do not have formal training as translators but they volunteer to participate in translation projects based on interest in a specific audiovisual genre, TV series, movie, etc.

== Media ==
Notable areas of fan translation include:

- Fansubbing – The subtitling of movies, television programs, video games and other audiovisual media by a network of fans. For many languages, the most popular fan subtitling is of Hollywood movies and American TV dramas, while fansubs into English and Hindi are largely of East Asian entertainment, particularly anime and tokusatsu.
- Fan translation of video games – this practice grew with the rise of video game console emulation in the late 1990s and still mainly focuses on older classic games. These translations are typically distributed as unofficial patches that modify the binary files of the original game into new binaries. Vazquez-Calvo (2018) provides an example of how the complex process of fan translating, negotiating the translated product and the subsequent distribution online sets the basis for rich language learning environments. However, there are communities who decide to make use of crowd translation for their fan translation tasks, including fan translation of video games. These fan translation projects are taken up by fans and outsourced by game developers, on the promise that any fan translated version of games will be published as a playable version of the game. While professional translation and localization would be much needed here, it is also true that companies and developers may not always have the budget to allow large-scale multilingual localizations. Additionally, some fans do want to play games in their vernacular language, even though they can understand other languages. An example of these fans are a group of Catalan gamers who decide to translate games from English into Catalan on their own and with the permission of developers. They are plurilingual and can understand, at least, English, Spanish, Aranese (a variant of the Occitan language, with official status in Catalonia), and Catalan. With their linguistic activism, not only do they serve their linguistic community, but also portray interesting linguistic ideologies and configure a complex site for metalinguistic discussion and subsequent language learning prompted by the intercultural and interlinguistic process of fan translating.
- Scanlation – The translation of comics, especially manga, as well as short stories and sometimes full novels, by a fan network. Fans scan the comics, turning them into computer images and translate the text in the images. The resulting translations are then generally distributed only in electronic format. An alternative method of distributing fan-translated sequential art is to distribute only the translated text, requiring readers to purchase a copy of the work in the original language.
- Fandubbing – The dubbing of movies, television programs, video games and other audiovisual products by a network of fans. The translated audio could offer a translation of the original soundtrack or be completely replaced by a new version, normally with humorous purposes, such as a parody or abridged series.

== History ==
Fan translation of audiovisual material, particularly fansubbing of anime, dates back to the 1980s. O'Hagan (2009) argues that fansubbing emerged as a form of protest over "the official often over-edited versions of anime typically aired in dubbed form on television networks outside Japan" and that fans sought more authentic translated versions in a shorter time frame.

Early fansubbing and fandubbing efforts involved manipulation of VHS tapes, which was time-consuming and expensive. The first reported fansub produced in the United States was of Lupin III, produced in the mid-1980s, requiring an average of 100 hours per episode to subtitle.

== Influence ==
The development of cultural industry, technological advances and the expansion of online platforms have led to a dynamic rise in fan translation. This has been followed by an increase in voluntary translation communities as well as in the variety of the content. The largest beneficiaries are the audience, readers and game players who are also fellow fans of various popular culture products, since they are given the chance to receive first-hand information from foreign cultures. The entertainment industry and other cultural industries also benefit because their products are given global exposure, with a consequence of cultural immersion and cultural assimilation. However, people also consider fan translation as a potential threat to professional translation. In fact, fan translation communities are built on the spirit of sharing, volunteering, a do-it-yourself attitude and most importantly, passion and enthusiasm for the same goal. Like a lot of specialization-based and art-based professions, rich experience and related knowledge are highly demanded in translation industry. Therefore, fan translation cannot be regarded as a threat. Instead, to some extent, it includes two significant senses: for fan translators, it means a period of valuable experience and a pack of adequate preparation no matter if they are willing to take their fun hobby into another level; for professional translators, it serves as a type of sources to be referred and consulted once they encounter similar situations. In addition, from the perspective of development of fan translation, the content is no longer limited within movies, video games and fan fictions. Various forms including educational courses, political speeches and critical news reports appear in recent years, which injects brand-new meaning to fan translation by extending its value from entertaining nature towards social significance. Just as Henry Jenkins states: "popular culture may be preparing the way for a more meaning public culture." As a newly emerging phenomenon dependent on the progress of Internet-supported infrastructure, it surpasses its original focus on personal interest and makes itself visible in front of the entire society. As a result, it has to be admitted that fan translation is somehow an inevitable trend.

== Problems concerning copyright and censorship ==
Fan translation often borders on copyright infringement, as fans translate films, video games, comics, etc. often without seeking proper permission from the copyright holders. Studies of fan translators have shown that these fans do so because they are enthusiastic about the works they translate and want to help other fans access the material. Copyright holders often condone fan translation because it can help expose their products to a wider audience. As-well as encouraging their works to be translated, many rights holders threaten creators of fan translations. In 2007, a French teenager was arrested for producing and releasing a translated copy of Harry Potter and the Deathly Hallows in French. In 2013, Swedish police took down a website which hosted fan-made subtitles for users to download. Releasing subtitles without including the original copyrighted work is not generally considered copyright infringement, but works that involve direct release of the copyrighted material like scanlation do infringe copyright law. Japanese copyright holders and publishers in particular often take down fan translations, viewing them as pirated versions of their works.

== See also ==
- Fan fiction
- Fandub
- Fansub
- Mother 3 fan translation
