= Nancy 11 =

Studio album by Nancy Ajram
- Released: July 17, 2025
- Recorded: 2024–2025
- Studios: Play Sound Studios; AB Brothers Studio
- Genres: Arabic pop; R&B; Pop rock
- Length: 34:47
- Label: In2Musica

Nancy Ajram chronology
Nancy 10 (2021)	Nancy 11 (2025)

Singles from Nancy 11
- 1. "Ya Albo" Released: November 11, 2025; 2. "Sidi Ya Sidi" Released: December 11, 2025

Nancy 11 is the eleventh studio album by Lebanese singer Nancy Ajram. It was released on July 17, 2025, by In2Musica, four years after its predecessor Nancy 10 (2021).

== Background and content ==
Ajram first disclosed that she was working on a new album in September 2024. The release date for the album had to be postponed due to the ongoing Middle Eastern crisis. She later discussed the album publicly on the sidelines of the 20th Mawazine music festival in Morocco. On July 11, 2025, she announced the release date for Nancy 11 as July 17, 2025. On her official Instagram account, Ajram published a video featuring a remix of the album's songs. On YouTube, each song was released along with a lyric video and visuals showing Ajram in different looks. The album clips managed to garner engagement on social media. According to its designer, the album's cover was meant to "reflect the maturity Nancy has reached on the artistic, physical, and mental levels". A love letter to her husband, children, and her fans, the album includes 11 songs ranging from rhythmic to romantic and dramatic, reflecting the personal and media attention surrounding Ajram following the 2020 home intrusion incident and subsequent divorce rumors.

== Track listing ==
Standard edition (Note: Credits are adapted from the description boxes of the album videos on Ajram's official YouTube channel.)
No.	Title	Lyrics	Music	Producer	Length
1.	"Baddi Oul Bhebak" (I Want to Say I Love You)	Karim Abdo	Karim Abdo	Alexandre Missakian	2:56
2.	"Ya Albo" (Oh His Heart)	Moustafa Hadouta	Attar	Jalal El Hamdaoui	2:30
3.	"Ana Tbaani?" (You Sold Me Out)	Tamer Hussein	Walid Saad	Amin Nabil	2:56
4.	"Ghyranin" (Jealous)	Nabil Khoury	Nabil Khoury	Bassem Rizk	2:56
5.	"Tarawa" (Freshness)	Aleem	Mohamed Yehia	Jalal El Hamdaoui	3:38
6.	"Ensa" (Forget It)	Salim Assaf	Salim Assaf	Bassem Rizk	3:24
7.	"Sidi Ya Sidi" (My Love)	Moustafa Hadouta	Attar	Jalal El Hamdaoui	2:36
8.	"Loghat Al Hob" (Language of Love)	Mohamed Refai	Walid Saad	Ahmed Adel	3:58
9.	"Gani Bil Leil" (He Came to Me at Night)	Tamer Hussein	Aziz El Shafei	Tarek Madkour	3:23
10.	"Aala Elmi" (As I've Always Known)	Gilbert Abi Nassif	Rayan Bourji	Bassem Rizk	3:10
11.	"Ana Hafdal Aghanni" (I Will Keep Singing)	Tamer Hussein	Aziz El Shafei	Tarek Madkour	3:30
Total length:					34:47

== Personnel ==
Adapted from the album liner notes.

- Roger Abi Akl - mastering, mixing (tracks 1, 4, 6, 10), mastering (tracks 2, 3, 5, 7, 8, 9, 11)
- Jalal El Hamdaoui - mixing (tracks 2, 5, 7), sound engineer (track 2)
- Amin Nabil - mixing (track 3)
- Hany Mahrous - mixing (track 8)
- Tarek Madkour - mixing (track 9, 11)

== Release history ==
Region	Date	Format(s)	Edition(s)	Label(s)	Ref.
Worldwide	July 17, 2025	Digital Download; Streaming	Standard	In2Musica	

== Accolades ==
Year	Award ceremony	Category	Result	Ref.
2025	People Bil Arabi Awards	Album Of The Year	Won	
2026	Murex d'Or	Best Music Video - "Ya Albo"	Won	
2026	Joy Awards	Best Female Singer	Pending	

== Tour ==
Spanning across five continents, the tour commenced on 11 May 2025 in Leiden, Netherlands and is currently scheduled to conclude on 17 July 2027 in Beirut, Lebanon, on the 2-year anniversary of the album.

Set list

This set list is from the 22 May 2026 concert in Paris. It does not represent all shows throughout the tour.

1. "Ya Albo"
2. "Badna Nwalle' El Jaw"
3. "Aala Shanak"
4. "Mashi Haddi"
5. "Albi Ya Albi"
6. "Oul Tani Eih"
7. "Yay"
8. "Men Nazra"
9. "Fi Hagat"
10. "Ehsas Jdeed"
11. "Ah W Noss"
12. "Salamat"
13. "Tarawa"
14. "El Donia Helwa"
15. "Sah Sah" (feat. Marshmello)
16. "Ana Yalli Bahebak"
17. "Law Dallalouni"
18. "Sana Wara Sana"
19. "Ma Tegi Hena"
20. "Ya Tabtab"
21. "Moagaba"
22. "Meen Dah Elly Nseik"
23. "Lawn Oyounak"
24. "Ah W Noss"
25. "Warana Eh"

During the 7 August 2025 concert in Sidon, Lebanon, Ajram performed "Sidi Ya Sidi".

During the 23 May 2026 concert in Paris, Ajram performed "Enta Eih" and "Ya Banat".

Tour dates

List of 2025 dates
Date (2025)	City	Country	Venue	Opening Act	Attendance	Revenue
May 11	Leiden	Netherlands	ECC Leiden	—	—	—
May 22	Doha	Qatar	Qatar National Convention Centre	—	—	—
June 14	Cevizli	Cyprus	Grand Sapphire Casino	—	—	—
June 20	Beirut	Lebanon	American University of Beirut	—	—	—
June 22	Rabat	Morocco	Mawazine Festival	—	—	—
June 28	London	United Kingdom	Royal Albert Hall	—	—	—
July 10	Amman	Jordan	King Hussein Business Park	—	—	—
July 26	New Alamein	Egypt	Layali Marassi	—	—	—
July 31	Jounieh	Lebanon	Casino du Liban	—	—	—
August 2	Carthage	Tunisia	Carthage Amphitheatre	—	—	—
August 7	Sidon	Lebanon	Sidon Sea Castle	—	—	—
August 10	Malmö	Sweden	Malmöfestivalen	—	—	—
August 16	Faqra	Lebanon	Faqra Roman Temple	—	—	—
August 23	Karavas	Cyprus	Karpaz Theatre	—	—	—
August 30	New Alamein	Egypt	U Arena	—	—	—
October 6	Muscat	Oman	Al Bustan Palace	—	—	—
October 31	Düsseldorf	Germany	Plaza Premium Timmendorfer Strand	—	—	—
November 5	Jakarta	Indonesia	Istora Senayan Arena	—	—	—
November 15	Copenhagen	Denmark	K.B. Hallen	—	—	—
November 21	Riyadh	Saudi Arabia	Riyadh Golf Club	—	—	—
December 2	Cairo	Egypt	Garden City Cairo	—	—	—
December 5	Dubai	United Arab Emirates	Atlantis Music Festival	—	—	—
Total					—	—

List of 2026 dates
Date (2026)	City	Country	Venue	Opening Act	Attendance	Revenue
February 9	Punta Cana	Dominican Republic	Blu Mar Music Festival	—	—	—
May 8	New Jersey	United States	Newark Symphony Hall	—N/a	—N/a	—N/a
May 9	Chicago	United States	Greenwood Oasis	—N/a	—	—
May 10	Detroit	United States	Fox Theatre	—N/a	—	—
May 14	Los Angeles	United States	Dolby Theatre	—N/a	—	—
May 15	Temecula	United States	Pechanga Resort Casino	—N/a	—	—
May 22	Paris	France	L'Olympia	Celia Maqâm	—	—
May 23	Paris	France	Palais des Congrès	—	—	—
May 29	Melbourne	Australia	Margaret Court Arena	DJ Chloe Kteily	—	—
May 30	Sydney	Australia	International Convention Centre Sydney	DJ Chloe Kteily	—	—
June 5	Manama	Bahrain	Exhibition World Bahrain	DJ Detour	—	—
June 11	Monte Carlo	Monaco	Monte Carlo Casino	—	—	—
June 13	Kyrenia	Cyprus	Casino Les Ambassadeurs	—	—	—
June 15	Kuwait City	Kuwait	Al Bidaa Theatre	DJ Chloe Kteily	—	—
June 16	Giza	Egypt	Grand Egyptian Theatre	—	—	—
July 17	Cairo	Egypt	Tutankhamun Grand Ballroom	—	—	—
August 7	New Alamein	Egypt	U Arena	—	—	—
September 12	Carthage	Tunisia	Carthage Amphitheatre	—	—	—
October 24	Dubai	United Arab Emirates	Coca-Cola Arena	—	—	—
November 13	Al-Ula	Saudi Arabia	Maraya Concert Hall	—	—	—
December 1	Alexandria	Egypt	AROYA Theatre	—	—	—
December 3	Kuwait City	Kuwait	Al-Soor Roman Theatre	—	—	—
December 19	Beirut	Lebanon	Seaside Arena	—	—	—
December 30	Istanbul	Turkey	Ora Arena	—	—	—
December 31	Amman	Jordan	Four Seasons Grand Ballroom	—	—	—
Total					—	—

List of 2027 dates
Date (2027)	City	Country	Venue	Opening Act	Attendance	Revenue
January 30	Jakarta	Indonesia	Istora Senayan Arena	—	—	—
July 17	Beirut	Lebanon	Forum de Beyrouth	—	—	—
Total					—	—
