= Nancy 9 (Hassa Beek) =

Nancy 9 (Hassa Beek) حاسّة بيك

Studio album by Nancy Ajram
- Released: April 21, 2017
- Recorded: July 2015 – February 2017
- Studio: Various: TK (Cairo); Hadi Sharara (Beirut); Joe Baroudjian (Beirut); AD studio (Beirut); Romantic (Beirut); Jean (Beirut); Boudy Naoum (Beirut)
- Genre: Arabic Pop; Dance; Electropop; R&B; World
- Length: 54:51
- Label: In2Musica
- Producer: Jiji Lamara (exec.); Nancy Ajram (exec.); Tarek Madkour; Bassem Rizk; Hadi Sharara; Ahmed Ibrahim; Hussam Kamil; Boudy Naoum

Nancy Ajram chronology
Nancy 8 (2014)	Nancy 9 (Hassa Beek) حاسّة بيك (2017)	Nancy 10 (2021)

Singles from Nancy 9
- 1. "Aam Betaala' Feek" Released: December 16, 2016; 2. "Hassa Beek" Released: April 6, 2017; 3. "W Maak" Released: March 29, 2018; 4. "El Hob Zay El Watar" Released: February 12, 2019

Nancy 9, also known as Hassa Beek (Arabic: حاسّة بيك, English: I Feel You), is the ninth studio album by Lebanese singer Nancy Ajram. It was released on April 21, 2017, through In2Musica. Ajram began planning the album in 2014. Work continued into 2015, during which she released the new single "Maakoul El Gharam" on November 15, which reached the top 1 on Anghami setting a new record in 12 hours; it was ultimately removed from the final track listing. Nancy 9 was made available for digital download on April 21 through iTunes. This album most notably features Nancy's chart topping hit "Aam Bet’alla Feek".

As executive producers, Nancy and her manager, Jiji Lamara, enlisted previous collaborators Tarek Madkour, Walid Saad, Samir Sfeir, Mohammed Rifai, Ahmed Ibrahim and Hadi Sharara to work alongside new collaborators such as Khaled Tag Eldeen, Salim Assaf, Tamer Hussein and Hicham Boulos. After a middling album in 2014, Nancy 8, this new album was expected to be a great come back for the Lebanese singer. The album was released to positive reviews from music critics and numerous publications included it on their lists of the best albums of 2017.

== Promotion and release ==
On March 26, 2017, Ajram announced the album on her social media accounts, revealing the cover art and pre-order release date. Two days later, she posted the official teaser video previewing 10 second snippets of each track. On March 30, the album was listed for pre-order and the songs were to be available on April 21. The songs "El Hob Zay El Watar" and "Keefak Bel Hob" were released as promotional singles. The first was released digitally on March 31, then was sent to radio one day later. It debuted at number one on Anghami's Top Anghami chart. Billboards featuring the album cover filled the streets of Lebanese and Egyptian cities in early April. The album was digitally released worldwide on April 21, followed by physical CD release two days later in the Arab world.

== Style and composition ==
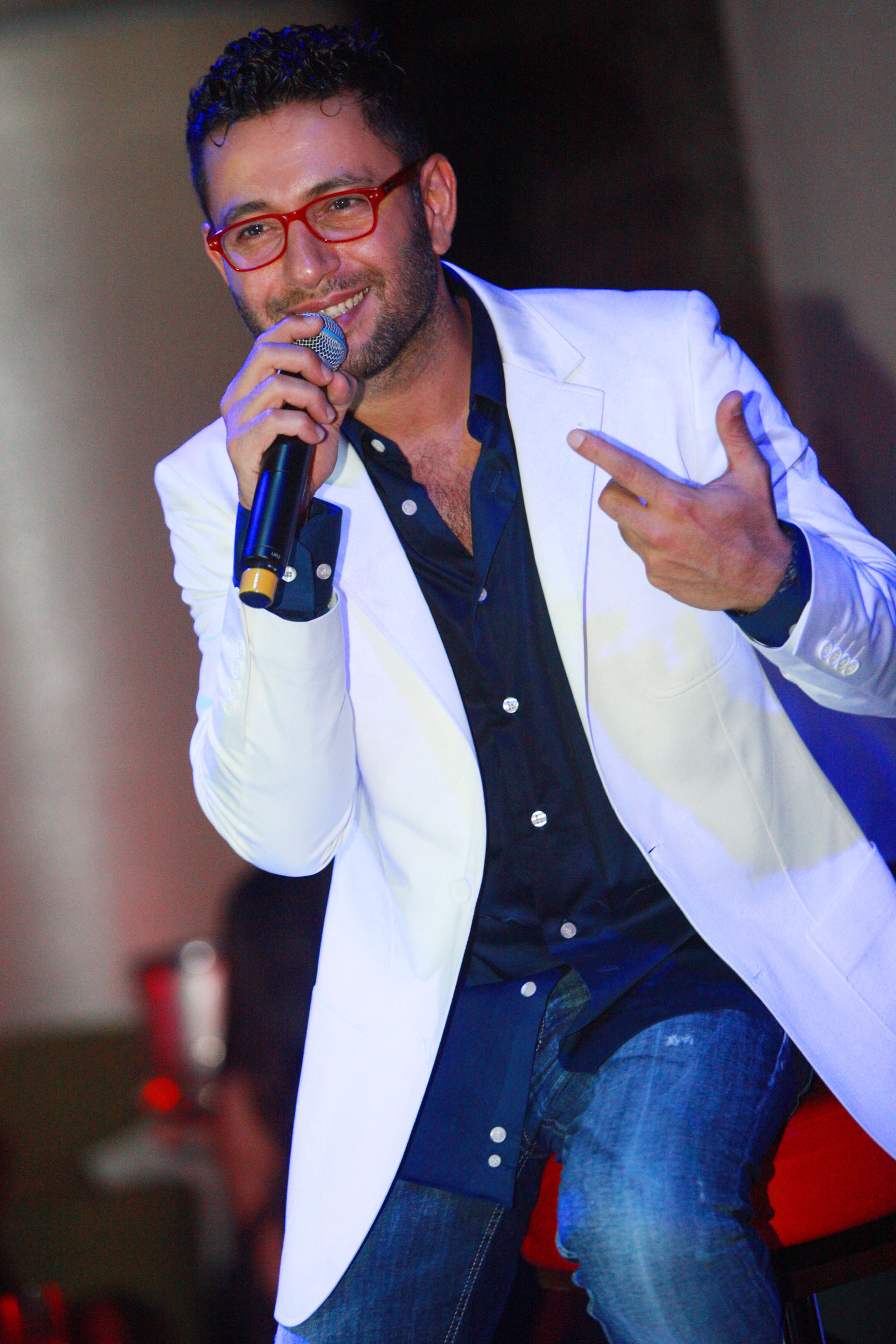
Ziad Bourji, wrote and composed two tracks in the album including the lead single.

Nancy 9 is built around a Mediterranean and South American theme that incorporates pop styles with elements of dance-pop and pop rock. The title track "Hassa Beek" relies on Latin guitar and beat, composed by Egyptian musician Khaled Ezz, whom Ajram collaborates with for the first time. The following track "Helm El Banat" is a folk-pop song, which contains anthemic chorus and Lebanese dabka rhythm. "Khamsa Farfasha" reminds of Ajram's Egyptian pop hits "Ah W Noss" and "Ya Tabtab", just as "Keefak Bel Hob" does.

One of the rhythmic songs in the album, "Albi Biyes'al Einy", is full of violins in a disco way, characterized by its western dance style. "Kharab Byoot" returns Ajram to the Khaleeji folk sound she presented in "La Teloum", which was released in Ah W Noss album. "El Hob Zay El Watar", a romantic sensual style mixed with a Tarab spirit, composed by Egyptian well-known musician Walid Saad, whom Ajram constantly works with. "W Maak" is a house-disco track, in which Ajram presents a completely new genre of the Middle Eastern music.

Another fast-Egyptian track is "Zabbat W Khattat", written by Tamer Hussein, whom Ajram also works with for the first time. "Bel Sodfa" and "Mesh Enta" are deep emotional sad tracks, speaking about a heartbroken woman who finds out her lover is cheating. The other Gulf song in the album is "Ayi Hob W Ayi Gheera", characterized by its rhythmic melody, showing a new side of Ajram's vocal abilities. "Aam Betaala' Feek" was selected as the album's lead single and is a romantic song about the beginning of love feelings. The reggaeton beat in "Rooh Ya Shater", composed by Samir Sfeir and produced by Boudy Naoum, reminds of some best 2000's songs.

== Singles ==
The album's lead single, "Aam Betaala' Feek", was released on December 16, 2016, exclusively through Anghami, which broke a new record as the fastest song to reach one Million streams in the App history. The song also received commercial success, topping several Arabic music charts and radio stations for consecutive weeks. A lyric video of the song was released two weeks later, on January 1, 2017.

"Hassa Beek", the title track, was released as the second single on April 6. The song peaked at number one on Anghami's Top Anghami chart and other music charts in several Arab countries. The official music video, which premiered on the same day, was viewed 1 million times on YouTube in its first 24 hours. The theatrics come alive in "Hassa Beek"'s video, which sees Ajram play the radiant role of an old Hollywood movie star in the midst of a steamy love affair. The almost six-minute video was directed by Leila Kanaan, as a comeback after a 5-year absence.

"W Maak" was released on March 29, 2018, as the album's third official single. The song went to radio stations in the Middle East in April 2017, it peaked at number one on Agmad 7 chart on Nogoum FM seven months prior to its single release. The official music video, also directed by Leila Kanaan, premiered at the same day of the single release, featuring Ajram in an old-school American-style diner, dressed in a metallic baseball jacket and denim shorts and getting weirdly over-familiar with the venue's jukebox. Later on, the video received four international awards and recognition, it was selected at Clipped Music Video Festival's International Top 30 chart, nominated for "Best Music Video" at the International Music Video Underground Festival, won "Merit Special Mention" at the Accolade Global Film Competition and "Best Music Video" at Queen Palm International Festival.

"El Hob Zay El Watar" was originally released as a promotional single for the album on March 31, 2017. Its official release as the fourth single took place on February 12, 2019, the same date its music video was released, marking her third collaboration with director Leila Kanaan in the album.

== Commercial performance ==
Nancy 9 debuted at number one on the HitMarker's Best-Selling Albums Chart and remained atop for 16 continuous weeks since its release. The record topped Virgin Megastores sales in Lebanon for 4 continuous months, while in Egypt it remained atop for 15 continuous weeks, as well as in KSA, UAE and Bahrain for continuous weeks.

== Track listing ==
The track list was announced via iTunes on March 30, 2017.

Standard edition
No.	Title	Lyrics	Music	Producer	Length
1.	"Hassa Beek" (I Feel You)	Khaled Tag Eldeen	Khaled Ezz	Tarek Madkour	3:46
2.	"Helm El Banat" (Charming Prince)	Salim Assaf	Salim Assaf	Bassem Rizk	3:41
3.	"Khamsa Farfasha" (Farfasha Overload)	Ayman Bahgat Amar	Walid Saad	Tarek Madkour	4:29
4.	"Albi Biyes'al Einy" (My Heart Asks My Eye)	Amir Teima	Khaled Ezz	Tarek Madkour	4:15
5.	"Kharab Byoot" (Torment)	Ziad Bourji	Ziad Bourji	Hadi Sharara	3:29
6.	"El Hob Zay El Watar" (Love Is Music to The Soul)	Mohammed Rifai	Walid Saad	Ahmed Ibrahim	4:23
7.	"Keefak Bel Hob" (Tell Me About Your Love)	Mounir Bou Assaf	Hicham Boulos	Bassem Rizk	3:42
8.	"W Maak" (When I'm With You)	Mohammed Rifai	Mohammed Yehia	Hadi Sharara	3:41
9.	"Mesh Enta" (Is It You?)	Mounir Bou Assaf	Hicham Boulos	Bassem Rizk	3:36
10.	"Zabbat W Khattat" (I've Planned It)	Tamer Hussein	Walid Saad	Ahmed Ibrahim	3:17
11.	"Bel Sodfa" (By Chance)	Bahaa Aldin Mohammed	Walid Saad	Ahmed Ibrahim	4:18
12.	"Ayi Hob W Ayi Gheera" (Love and Jealousy)	Khaled Al Marikhi	Talal	Hussam Kamil	4:36
13.	"Aam Betaala' Feek" (I Am Getting Attached to You)	Ziad Bourji	Ziad Bourji	Hadi Sharara	3:36
14.	"Rooh Ya Shater" (Come On Darling)	Safouh Shaghala	Samir Sfeir	Boudy Naoum	3:59
Total length:					54:51

== Personnel ==
Adapted from the album liner notes.

- Ahmed Ragab – bass (tracks 1,3)
- Mostafa Aslan – guitar (tracks 1,3,4,5,10)
- Ehab Farouk – percussion (track 1)
- Yehia EL Mougy – studio choir conducting (tracks 1,4)
- Yehia Zakaria – executive production (tracks 1,3,4)
- Tarek Madkour – producer; mixing; (tracks 1,3,4)
- Elie Barbar – mastering mixing (tracks 2,5,7,8,9,13)
- Farouk Mohammed Hasan – accordion (track 3)
- Reda Bedair – ney (track 3)
- Maged Souror – qanun (tracks 3,10)
- Hisham El Arabi – riq (track 3)
- Ahmed Ayadi – tabla (track 3)
- Mohammed Sakr – mixing (tracks 6,10)
- Ahmed Ibrahim – producer; strings writing (track 6); mixing (track 11); piano (track 11)
- Tamer Ghonim – strings conducting (track 6)
- Wael El Naggar – accordion (track 10)
- Said Kamal – violin (track 11)
- Sherif Fahmy – guitar (track 11)
- Hussam Kamil – producer; mixing (track 12)
- Khaled Abu Munther – general supervision (track 12)
- Boudy Naoum – producer; mixing (track 14)
- Mohamad Seifeedine AKA mSeif – photography
- Jad Aoun – graphic design
- Caroline Cassia Mokbel – styling
- Fady Kataya – make-up
- Mohamad Edelbi – hair dressing
- Elie Saab – dressing

== Release history ==
Region	Date	Format(s)	Edition(s)	Label(s)	Ref.
Worldwide	April 21, 2017	Digital Download	Standard	In2Musica	
Middle East	April 23, 2017	CD; Digital Download	Standard	In2Musica; EWE Productions; Platinum Records; Music Misr	

== Awards and nominations ==
Anghami
Year	Nominee / work	Award	Result
2017	Nancy Ajram	Most Streamed Artist	Won
2017	Aam Betaala' Feek	Most Streamed Song	Won
2017	Nancy 9	Most Streamed Album	Won

Murex d'Or
Year	Nominee / work	Award	Result
2018	Nancy Ajram	Best Female Lebanese Singer	Won
2018	Nancy 9	Best Album	Won
2018	Nancy 9	Best Music Video	Nominated

Arab Nation Music Awards
Year	Nominee / work	Award	Result
2018	Nancy Ajram	Best Arabic Female Singer of 2017	Won
2018	Aam Betaala' Feek	Best Levant Song of 2017	Won
2018	Aam Betaala' Feek	Most Streamed and Downloaded Song of 2017	Won
2018	Aam Betaala' Feek	Song of the Year 2017	Nominated
2018	Nancy 9	Best Levant Song of 2017	Nominated
2018	Nancy 9	Best album of 2017	Nominated
