= Ya Tabtab...Wa Dallaa =

Ya Tabtab...Wa Dallaa يا طَبطَب...ودلّع

Studio album by Nancy Ajram
- Released: February 21, 2006
- Recorded: 2005–2006
- Studios: Various: Leila (Cairo); ART (Cairo); Sout Al Musiqiyyin (Cairo); Al Takamul (Cairo); Hadi Sharara (Beirut); Joe Baroudijian (Beirut)
- Genres: Arabic Pop; World
- Length: 47:58
- Label: Art Line Music
- Producers: Jiji Lamara (exec.); Tarek Madkour; Hadi Sharara; Omar Abdel Aziz; Mohammed Mustafa; Karim Abdel Wahab; Bassem Rizk

Nancy Ajram chronology
Ah W Noss (2004)	Ya Tabtab...Wa Dallaa يا طَبطَب...ودلّع (2006)	Shakhbat Shakhabit (2007)

Singles from Ya Tabtab Wa Dallaa
- 1. "Moegabah" Released: December 21, 2005; 2. "Ya Tabtab" Released: February 11, 2006; 3. "Ana Yalli Bhebbak" Released: May 26, 2006; 4. "Ehsas Jdeed" Released: October 23, 2006; 5. "Elli Kan" Released: July 1, 2007; 6. "Mishtaga Leik" Released: November 29, 2007

Ya Tabtab...Wa Dallaa (Arabic: يا طبطب...ودلع, English: Pat and Pamper) is the fifth studio album by Lebanese singer Nancy Ajram. It was released on February 21, 2006, through Art Line Music. Ajram worked with various producers on the album, including Tarek Madkour, Hadi Sharara, Omar Abdel Aziz, Mohammed Mustafa, Karim Abdel Wahab and Bassem Rizk. Inspired by a humorous traditional rhythm, Ya Tabtab was a remarkable turn in Ajram's career. Its lead single and title track was released as a response for critics who had accused Ajram of singing "with her body". She appeared in the lead single's video fully dressed as a clown, showing no skin and wearing baggy clothes.

Critics gave generally positive reviews of the album, praising its composition and Ajram's new musical direction. The album received four Murex d'Or nominations and two win in the Best Female Lebanese Singer and Best Music Video categories at the 2007 ceremony. The album debuted at number one on several Arabic music charts and topped Virgin Megastores sales in several Arab countries, including Lebanon, Egypt, Jordan, KSA, UAE, Syria, Morocco and more.

Ya Tabtab...Wa Dallaa spawned six singles, including the title track "Ya Tabtab", "Moegaba", "Ana Yalli", "Ehsas Jdeed", "Elli Kan" and "Mishtaga Leik".

== Background and release ==
After her international breakthrough with Ya Salam and Ah W Noss albums, Ajram's next move became a highly anticipated Pop event in the Arab World and media speculation about a fifth Ajram album rose shortly after the release of the final Ah W Noss single, "Inta Eyh". On New Year's Eve 2005, Ajram's manager and Ya Tabtab's executive producer, Jiji Lamara, confirmed that she would be releasing an album and compared the new project to a "stunning circus act".

A circus-themed Coca-Cola commercial featuring Ajram had been airing for a while, with "Moegaba" being sampled in the high-cost clip. "Moegaba" went number one before "Ya Tabtab," the lead single and title track, despite not being released initially. Both singles ended up topping charts in Lebanon and Egypt.

In February 2006, the music video for the lead single, "Ya Tabtab," was released and was directed by longtime collaborator and friend Nadine Labaki. The music video was highly praised by critics and began a circus phenomenon. With the video, the full album was released with 11 songs, to be yet an even bigger success for Ajram.

Ya Tabtab...Wa Dallaa marked a shift in Ajram's career. The seductive small town Egyptian girl style Ajram had employed for the previous two albums was toned down and Ajram instead opposed the general Arabic Pop current. For the album cover, she appears wearing a black cut with a circus hat and a red background.

== Singles and impact ==
=== Official Singles ===
- "Ya Tabtab Wa Dallaa" (Translation: Pat And Pamper) also shortened as "Atabtab" was a song composed in Egyptian Arabic and released in the form of a music video single in February 2006. The video was directed by Nadine Labaki and features Ajram in a clown's outfit and makeup in a nomadic circus bus in a small Egyptian town. In the story, Ajram is on tour with her love interest, a tough and built guy of the jealous and needy type, to whom she is submissive and obedient. During the funny family video, Ajram dances and sings and performs circus acts alongside her lover, whom gets jealous when a clown offers her a flower. They all get into a fight and Ajram ends the video while medicating her bruised up lover. The song went number one in the Arab world including Lebanon, Egypt and Saudi Arabia. It continued a chain of chart-topping hits by Ajram, which started with "Akhasmak Ah" and would go on continuously until 2014 "Ma Tegi Hena" from Nancy 8.
- "Ehsas Jdeed" (Translation: A New Sentiment) was released to radios as the second official single from Atabtab. The high-cost video was directed by Said El Marouk. The song is performed by Ajram in sign language in a storyline where she falls in love with a deaf/silent lover. A love of which the parents in the story disapprove. Filming took place in a romantic natural setting featuring a lake and a hill-side small shack where Nancy and her love interest reside. the Egyptian singer Moustafa Amar, revealed in an interview that the song "Ya Tabtab Wa Dalla" was originally offered to him, but he felt that the song lyrics were feminine and he told the producers that the song would be better performed by a female singer especially Nancy
- "Mishtaga Leik" (Translation: I Miss You) was released as the official third and final single. The song became a Top 10 hit and its video, directed by Mirna Khayat, aired six months after the release of Ajram's following album, the children's Shakhbat Shakhabit.

=== Commercial Singles ===
The following songs were released as singles after their success due to commercial ad features that Ajram collaborated in.

- "Moegaba" (Translation: Admirer) was sampled in 2005 in a Coca-Cola commercial. The song became a radio smash before the lead single, despite its release being delayed. Its music video is set inside a big circus tent with Ajram trying on numerous outfits inspired by the circus. The music video is credited as one of the most expensive videos of all time. "Moegaba" became another big hit and a number one across the Arab Nation.
- "Ana Yalli Bhebbak" (Translation: I'm the One Who Loves You) was made available for radio stations due to its high demand after being featured in a jewelry commercial by Ajram in collaboration with DAMAS Jewelry and the World Gold Council. The song is yet another big smash hit. Its video is in a resto-cafe where ajram performs while youngsters fall in love, dance and celebrate.
- "Elli Kan" (Translation: What Used to Be) was released as another gold commercial with a traditional-themed video.

== Track listing ==
Standard edition

No.	Title	Lyrics	Music	Producer	Length
1.	"Ya Tabtab Wa Dallaa" (Pat and Pamper)	Ayman Bahgat Amar	Tarek Madkour	Tarek Madkour	4:22
2.	"Ehsas Jdeed" (A New Sentiment)	Fares Iskandar	Salim Salameh	Hadi Sharara	4:30
3.	"Moegaba" (Admirer)	Bahaa El Din Mohammed	Walid Saad	Tarek Madkour	3:37
4.	"Mishtaga Leik" (I Miss You)	Sheikh Sabah Nasser Al Sabah	Yaacoub Al Khubayzi	Omar Abdel Aziz	4:27
5.	"Ana Yalli Bhebbak" (I'm the One Who Loves You)	Nizar Francis	Samir Sfeir	Tarek Madkour	3:28
6.	"Ashtiki Menno" (Complain About Him)	Walid el Issawi	Hamdi El Seddeek	Tarek Madkour	3:24
7.	"Oul Hansaki" (Say You'll Forget Me)	Bahaa El Din Mohammed	Hassan Abou El Soud	Mohammed Mustafa	5:54
8.	"Elli Kan" (What Used to Be)	Hani Abdel Karim	Walid Saad	Karim Abdel Wahab	4:32
9.	"Ya Si El Sayed" (Master)	Fawzi Ibrahim	Mohammed Saad	Tarek Madkour	4:20
10.	"Sabrak Alayya" (Have Some Patience)	Hani Abdel Karim	Walid Saad	Mohammed Mustafa	4:52
11.	"Law Dallalooni" (Whatever They Do)	Elias Nasser	Souheil Fares	Bassem Rizk	4:32
Total length:					47:58

== Personnel ==
Adapted from the album liner notes.

- Mohammed Sakr – sound engineer (tracks 1,3,5,6,9)
- Yehia EL Mougy – strings writing and conducting (tracks 1,3,5,6,9)
- Hadi Sharara – producer; sound engineer (track 2)
- Tamer Ghonim – strings writing and conducting (track 2)
- Khaled Raouf – sound engineer (track 4)
- Sameh El Mazini – sound engineer (tracks 4,7,8,10)
- Omar Abdel Aziz – producer; strings writing and conducting (track 2)
- Mustafa Raouf – sound engineer (tracks 7,8,10)
- Hani Farhat – strings writing and conducting (tracks 7,8,10)
- Joe Baroudjian – sound engineer (track 11)
- Bassem Rizk – producer; strings writing and conducting (track 11)
- David Abdallah – photography
- Fares El Jammal – photography
- Tony Haddad – digital mastering
- Georges Yucef – graphic design
- Fady Kataya – makeup
- Wassim Morkos from Pace e Luce – hairdressing
