= Nancy Ajram =

Lebanese singer (born 1983)

- نانسي عجرم
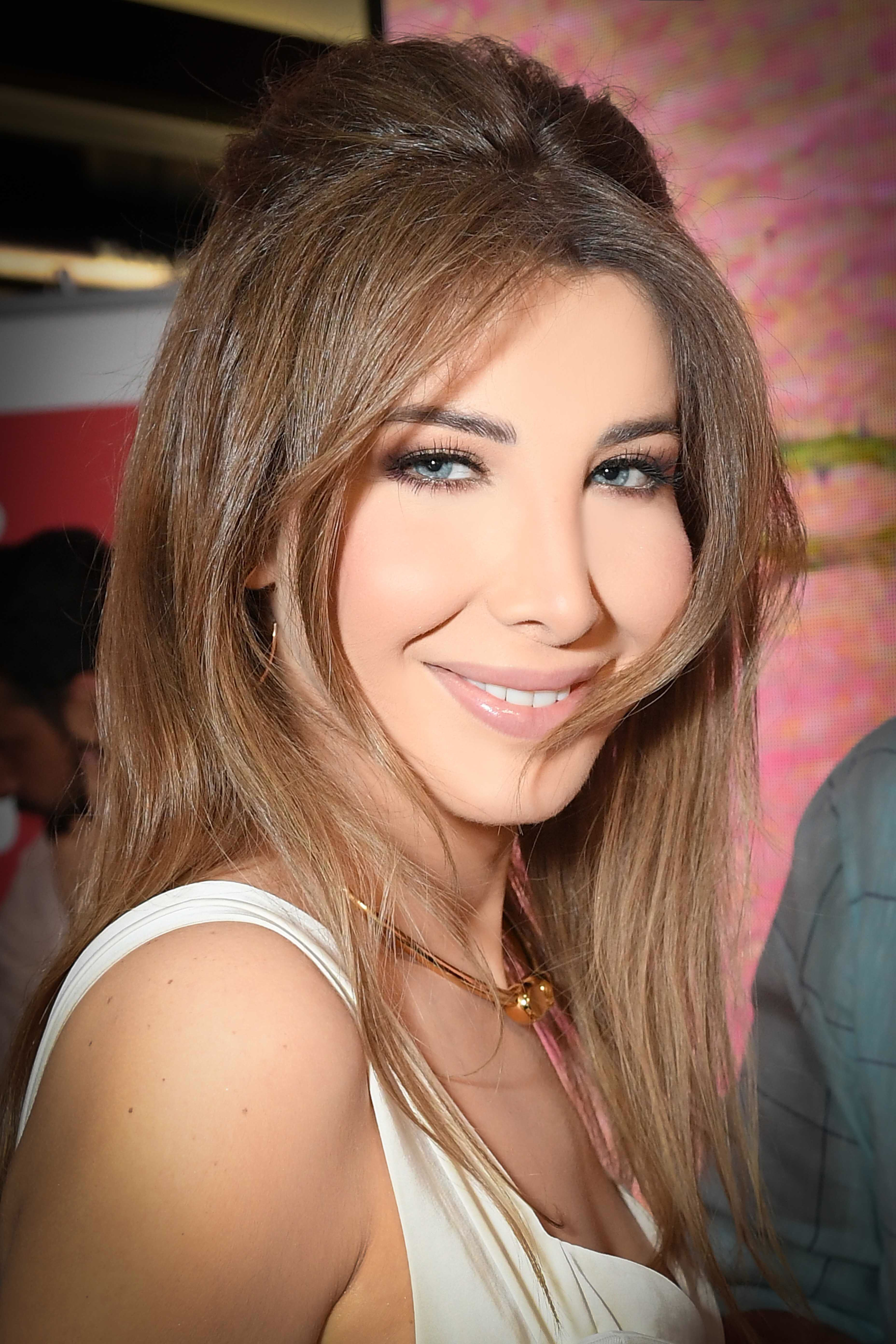
- Ajram during the Nancy 9 album signing ceremony in May 2017
- Born: Nancy Nabil Ajram; May 16, 1983 (age 43); Achrafieh, Beirut, Lebanon
- Occupations: Singer; television judge
- Years active: 1996–present
- Spouse: Fadi El Hachem (m. 2008)
- Children: 3
- Musical career
- Genre: Arabic pop
- Instruments: Vocals; piano; keyboards; oud
- Labels: EMI; Relax-In; Megastar; Art Line Music; EWE; In2Musica
- Website: nancyajram.com

Nancy Nabil Ajram (Arabic: نانسي نبيل عجرم, Lebanese Arabic: [ˈnæːnsi ˈʕæʒræm]; born May 16, 1983) is a Lebanese singer and television personality, often dubbed as the "Queen of Arab Pop". With the support of her father, she began performing as a child and appeared on several television shows in her early years. By the age of 15, Ajram signed a recording contract with EMI and released her debut studio album Mihtagalak (1998). In spite of being under the legal age, Ajram was accepted to the Syndicate of Professional Artists in Lebanon. The following year, she released her second album Sheel Oyoonak Anni (2001).

Her breakthrough occurred with the start of her collaboration with well-known Lebanese producer Jiji Lamara, when she released her hit single "Akhasmak Ah"; created by Egyptian composer Mohamed Saad, and third studio album Ya Salam (2003) in which she adopted a more sensual public image while reinventing her music. Ajram's fourth album Ah W Noss (2004) was another commercial success, spawning the chart-topping singles "Ah W Noss", "Lawn Ouyounak", "Oul Tani Keda" and "Inta Eyh", at which point she had established pop icon status in the Middle East. In 2007, Ajram released her first children's album, Shakhbat Shakhabit, which was the most notable and successful work for children at the time. Betfakkar Fi Eih (2008), her sixth album, produced seven singles including the commercially successful Egyptian hits "Betfakkar Fi Eih", "Min Dally Nseek" and the Lebanese single "Mashi Haddi". It won Ajram her first World Music Award (WMA) for best-selling Middle-Eastern artist, and made her the youngest Arab WMA winner to date.

Having sold over 30 million records as of 2007, Ajram is one of the best-selling Middle Eastern music artists. By 2010 she was announced the best-selling Middle Eastern female singer of the decade (2000–2009). Throughout her career, Ajram has released twelve studio albums to date (including two dedicated for children) and numerous chart toppers such as "Yay", "Ya Tabtab", "Moegaba", "Ehsas Jdeed", "Ibn El Giran", "Fi Hagat", "Ya Kether", "Ma Tegi Hena", "Aam Betaala' Feek", "Badna Nwalee El Jaw", "Salamat", and "Aala Shanak". Ajram is the first and only female spokesperson of Coca-Cola in the Arab world, releasing several promotional Coke anthems that became instant smash-hits, such as "Oul Tani Keda", "El Dounya Helwa", "Noss El Kawn" and "Shaggaa Bi Alamak". Ajram has made the list of Most Powerful Arabs on Arabian Business several times, and was similarly listed by Newsweek as one of the most influential Arab singers.

She has appeared in patriotic songs for her country Lebanon, and has also dedicated seven patriotic songs to Egypt; a country she is widely popular in thanks to her Egyptian hits such as "Akhasmak Ah" and "Ah W Noss". Between 2013 and 2017, Ajram served as a judge on MBC's reality talent show Arab Idol. She also served as a coach on The Voice Kids Arabia for three seasons between 2016 and 2020. In 2020, Nancy was the most-streamed Arab female artist on Spotify, achieving more than 100 million plays of her songs, followed by Lebanese singer Fairuz with 67 million plays.

== Biography ==
=== 1983–2001: Early life and career beginnings ===
Nancy Ajram was born into a Lebanese Orthodox Christian family on May 16, 1983, in Achrafieh, a district in Beirut, Lebanon. She is the eldest child of Nabil Ajram and Raymonda Aoun. She has one sister, Nadine, and one brother, Nabil Jr. Ajram was only eight when she started singing with her grandmother, then carried on with successful participation in children's contests in two local television stations, TL and LBC. In 1995, at the age of twelve, Ajram took part in a variety show, Noujoum Al-Moustakbal (English: Stars of the Future) on Future TV, a Lebanese reality television competition, which finds new solo musical talent. Ajram won a gold medal in the Tarab category after singing a song by Umm Kulthum. Ajram studied music with renowned Lebanese musicians and although she was less than 18 years old, the syndicate of professional artists in Lebanon accepted her as a member. At the age of 13, Ajram released her debut single "Kel Ma B'ello B Albi El Gheere" in 1996, followed by "Oulha Kelma" one year later. In 1998, she signed a recording contract with EMI and released her debut studio album Mihtagalak, followed by Sheel Oyoonak Anni (2001).

=== 2002–2004: Breakthrough and new image ===
In early 2002, Ajram signed a contract with renowned Lebanese producer and artist manager Jiji Lamara, four months after his splitting with Aline Khalaf. They started working together in preparation for the third studio album shifting her musical style and image away from the decent girl. Ajram's breakthrough single, "Akhasmak Ah", was released in December. The music video caused a controversy; reminiscent of older Egyptian films, she appeared as a café manager who dances and flirts with its customers. It received criticism from various news publications, and it was meant to be banned on several Arabic televisions due to its sexually suggestive content. However, in early 2003, Ajram rose to fame, propelled by the success of the single, and the release of her third studio album, Ya Salam which was a best-seller.

Her fourth album, Ah W Noss, was released on April 14, 2004, and it was also an important marking point in Ajram's career. The tremendous success that Ah W Noss achieved, stabilized Ajram's position as an A-List star in the Arab music industry. Ajram then filmed "Lawn Ouyounak" (Color of Your Eyes), which portrayed Ajram as a bride in a wedding. After the release of the album, Ajram signed-up with Coca-Cola to be their official celebrity spokesperson for the Middle East and North Africa region. Her first Coke commercial featured her hit, "Oul Tani Keda?" (Say That Again?), which was filmed with the international Italian director Luca Tomassini. The commercial's success led to it being filmed as a music video behind the scenes of the commercial. The 4th hit single from the album, "Inta Eyh?" (What Are You?), was a slow composed by Samir Sfeir. Lebanese Oscar-nominated producer Nadine Labaki directed the music video that featured Ajram as a wife who sees her husband cheating on her yet she hides it in torment to save their relationship. The music video received tremendous positive reviews and Ajram was greatly praised. Leading Egyptian actors and directors, such as Faten Hamama, praised Ajram's acting abilities, and movie offers doubled for Ajram.

=== 2005–2007: Ya Tabtab...Wa Dallaa and Shakhbat Shakhabit ===
Her fifth album, Ya Tabtab...Wa Dallaa was released on February 21, 2006. Ya Tabtab was considered Ajram's best album back then, with six music videos released, eight radio hits, and five songs used for commercials. The title track's music video was Ajram's last collaboration with Nadine Labaki, as she then started working on her movie Caramel. Ajram then released the video of her Coca-Cola hit "Moegaba" (Admirer), as well as a video and commercial for her newly signed Damas Jewellery contract advertising their "Farfasha" set. The song used was "Ana Yalli" (I'm the One) which was promoted before the album's release. Ajram then cooperated for the first time with prominent Lebanese director Said El Marouk, filming "Ehsas Jdeed" (A New Sentiment) which is widely considered to be the most successful song of the album. The video, which was a salute from Said to his deaf and mute parents, depicted the story of a rich woman who falls in love with a deaf and mute man. In December 2006, Ajram performed alongside Lionel Richie in Egypt at a launching event. Later in 2007, Ajram released all together the video of "Elli Kan" (What Used to Be) for Damas's second campaign, her Coca-Cola Side of Life commercial featuring a new single "El Donia Helwa" (Life is Beautiful), and an album directed towards children, titled Shakhbat Shakhabit (Scribbled Doodles). "El Donia Helwa", Ajram's seventh commercial, is considered one of her most successful commercials representing her style and Coca-Cola's with colors, happiness, and music, and it led her to release a live album featuring the single.

Ajram's first album which was fully dedicated to children included a variety of songs aimed towards teaching children good values and morals, something she has wanted to do for a long time. The music video was her second cooperation with Said El Marouk and featured four songs from her album, the most successful of which were "Shakhbat Shakhabit" & "Shater Shater". Ajram performed these songs at several fund-raising events for children and other children's events, such as the children's TV channel MBC3, and the children's entertainment TV Show "Star Zghar". She then filmed with Fadi Haddad, the director of photography of her previous works with El Marouk, a video for the song "Risala Lil Aalam" (A Message to the World) which talks about world peace. The video was released on May 25, 2008, the day the Lebanese president General Michel Suleiman was elected ending a deadlock that lasted since November. It was the first video for Ajram that had an entirely graphical world that implied the suffering of children worldwide and the need to bring out a more colorful and happy world for them. Old rumors claimed that the video was presented to the UNICEF.

=== 2008–2010: Betfakkar Fi Eih, WMA, FIFA World Cup and Nancy 7 ===
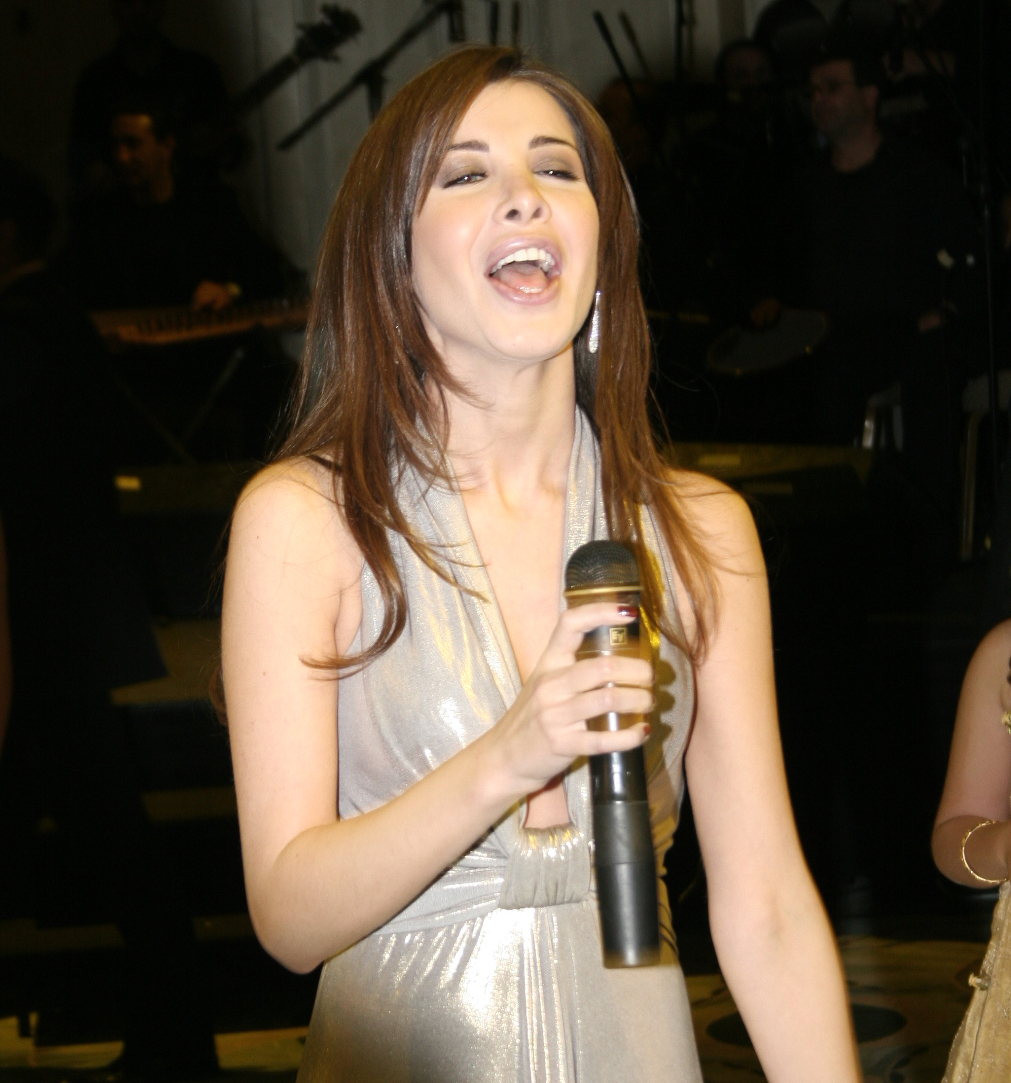
Ajram performing at an event in Cairo, 2008

In February and March 2008, Ajram released three Coca-Cola commercials that featured a brand new hit from her long-awaited album. The song, "Meen Ghairy Ana (Noss El Kawn)" (Who Else But Me?) was made by the successful "Yay" and "Ana Yalli" trio, Nizar Francis, Samir Sfeir, and Tarek Madkour. The single was an instant hit and served as a highly successful promotion 5 months before the release of the album. Ajram released her sixth studio album after several delays on July 30, 2008. This long-awaited comeback album held many surprises for her fans with a huge change in her style that presented her new matured vocal abilities. Ajram's sixth album, Betfakkar Fi Eih, is considered to be one of her most successful albums so far as it won her first World Music Award in her career. The album included her first "Tarab" song called "Biteegy Sirtak" since 1998's Mihtagalak album, and in general had a wide mix of several different styles ranging from dance, beat, pop, to drama, romance, Tarab and oldies. Even though "Betfakkar Fi Eih" music video had mixed opinions, the second single video, "Min Dally Nseek" was much more accepted, peaking at No. 1 for seven consecutive weeks in Melody Hits. On November 9, 2008, about two months after her marriage, Ajram won her first World Music Award for her best-selling album Betfakkar Fi Eih. In her short speech, Ajram thanked her parents, Jiji Lamara, her fans and album makers, and husband, saying "2008 has been a fantastic year – a successful album, my wedding, and now a World Music Award, what can I ask for more?". The same musical trio who created "Ehsas Jdeed" did one of the instant radio-hits of the album, "Lamset Eed" (Touch of a Hand), which was filmed with Leila Kanaan with a high budget, and the song and music video peaked charts for months. With this album Ajram signed a celebrity endorsement deal with Sony Ericsson, as a special w595 phone was released holding Ajram's signature, and "Wana Ben Ideik" was chosen as the commercial song.

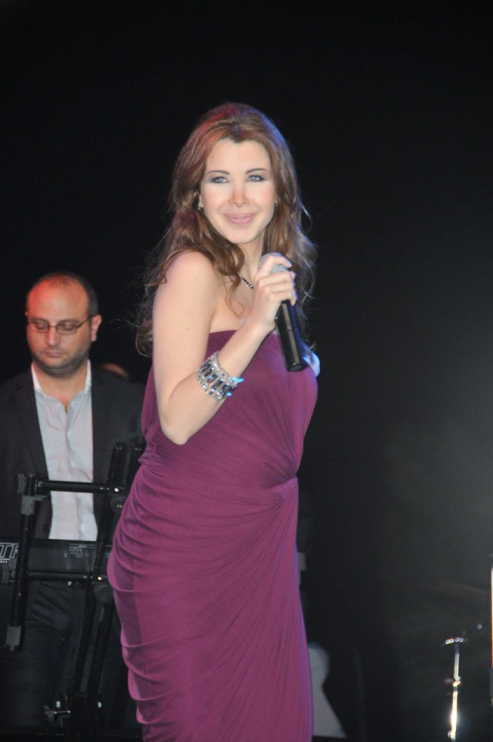
Ajram during a concert in Bahrain, 2010

On September 28, 2009, The Oprah Winfrey Show aired an episode titled "Fame Around the World" that talked about the most famous celebrities around the globe in brief reports. Representing the Middle East region and Arab world, Ajram appeared in a report featured on the show and was described by Oprah as "the Britney Spears of the Middle East". Ajram is the first and only Middle-Eastern artist ever mentioned on the show.

In the summer of 2010, Ajram was nominated by Coca-Cola the Middle East to sing, along with K'naan, his international hit and song for the 2010 FIFA World Cup, "Wavin' Flag". The Arabic version, titled "Shaggaa Be Alamak" and directed to the Middle East region, had its Arabic parts written by Ayman Bahgat Amar (who previously wrote Ah W Noss, Ya Tabtab and Eftah Albak for Ajram) and the music remastered by Tarek Madkour. The original music video was used for K'naan's parts while Ajram's parts were filmed separately in Lebanon on the same protocol under Leila Kanaan's co-direction. Both the video and song were aired heavily during the FIFA season and part of the song was particularly played during commercial breaks on Al Jazeera channel, which exclusively aired the games to the Arab world. One month later, Ajram filmed a commercial for her newly signed contract with Lactalis advertising their Lactel yoghurt.

On August 30, Ajram's official Facebook page posted a 16-second preview of the music video for Ajram's next single, "Fi Hagat". Later, it was announced that Nadine Labaki directed the video, thus making her comeback to music video direction after her 4-year break. The video is also the first collaboration between Ajram and Labaki since 2006's "Ya Tabtab". The full music video premiered on September 6, 2010, at 8:00 pm on Arabica TV and MTV Lebanon, the same day of her seventh full-length studio album release entitled Nancy 7. As of January 2011, Ajram became the first and most viewed Arabic music video owner on the Internet.

=== 2011–2014: Super Nancy, Arab Idol and Nancy 8 ===
In August 2011, Nissan chose Ajram to be the official ambassador in the Middle East and North Africa. On September 7, Ajram officially launched the all-new 2012 Nissan Micra at a special press conference in Lebanon.

On January 6, 2012, it was officially announced that Ajram won her second World Music Award as the World's Best-Selling Middle Eastern Artist for Nancy 7 album sales in 2011.

On September 13, 2012, Ajram released her second album dedicated to children, entitled Super Nancy with the lead single "Ya Banat". By the end of the month, Anlene named Ajram their new regional Ambassador for the fortified adult milk brand. The commercial was filmed in August with Lebanese born American director Oliver Ojeil in Beirut. In a press conference held in Dubai on October 20, Ajram stated that she will help raise awareness of osteoporosis and bone health among women in the Middle East. A month later, it was officially announced that Ajram joined the second season of the popular talent show Arab Idol, joining fellow judges Lebanese singer Ragheb Alama, Emirati singer Ahlam and Egyptian record producer Hassan El Shafei. After many delays, Ajram finally released her eighth full-length studio album entitled Nancy 8 on March 21, 2014, which has been highly anticipated by fans for almost four years. The album's lead single, "Ma Tegi Hena", was well received by music critics who compared it to "Akhasmak Ah," Ajram's breakthrough hit single. Two months later, Ajram received her third World Music Award as the best-selling Middle Eastern artist on May 27, 2014, in Monte Carlo, Monaco.

In September 2014, Ajram returned as a judge on the third season of Arab Idol. Three of the four judges, including her, returned with Ragheb Alama being replaced, after two consecutive seasons, by another well-known Lebanese singer, Wael Kfoury. A month later, October 2, 2014, Huawei announced Ajram as its Middle East and North Africa Brand Ambassador at the launch of the Huawei Ascend Mate 7 smartphone in Dubai. A day before, the TV commercial came out on Ajram's official Facebook page, featuring her hit "Nam Bi Albi" from Nancy 8 album, which was filmed with Lebanese director Said El Marouk and produced by Oliver Ojeil under the label of his production company Chiaroscuro Films. 48 hours later, the music video reached 1 million views.

=== 2015–present: The Voice Kids, Nancy 9, Nancy 10 and Nancy 11 ===
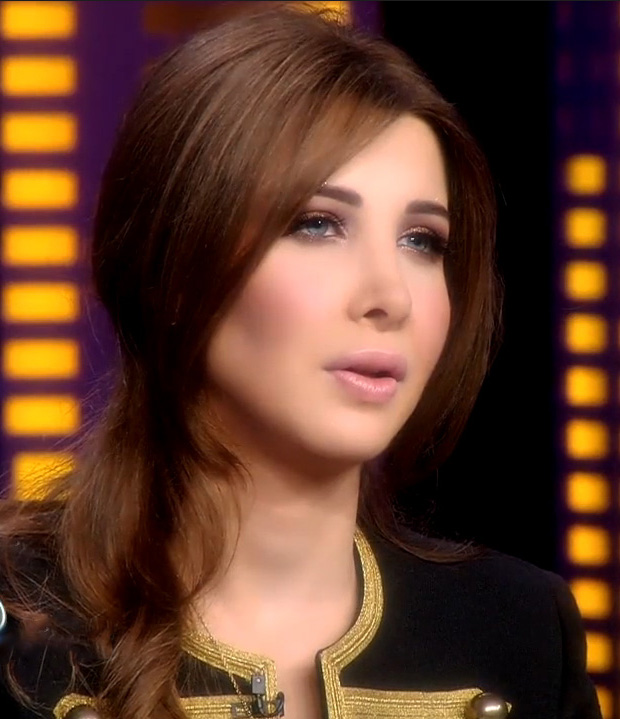
Ajram at the 4th season of Arab Idol in 2016

In July 2015, Ajram was officially confirmed as a judge in the first season of the highly acclaimed TV show The Voice Kids alongside Kadim Al Sahir and Tamer Hosny. The show premiered on MBC1 on January 2, 2016. As of 2020, Nancy was still a judge on the show's 3rd and most recent season wherein her contestant won.

On its 20th anniversary, Home Centre announced Ajram as brand ambassador. During the launching event that took place on October 13, 2015, in Dubai, Ajram said: "I'm delighted to be part of the Home Centre family. Homes are an extension of one's personality through which they are able to express themselves and Home Centre very well gives you the kind of products that help you create that space. As someone who takes pride in my home, Home Centre is certainly a brand I can connect to. I look forward to our association in the months to come."

A year after Ajram began working on her ninth studio album, the single "Maakoul El Gharam" was released on November 15, 2015, which reached the No. 1 spot on Anghami, setting a new record in 12 hours; it was ultimately removed from the final track listing for her ninth studio album. Ajram returned as a judge on Arab Idol for its fourth season alongside fellow judges Wael Kfoury, Ahlam and Hassan El Shafei; the fourth season premiered on November 4, 2016.

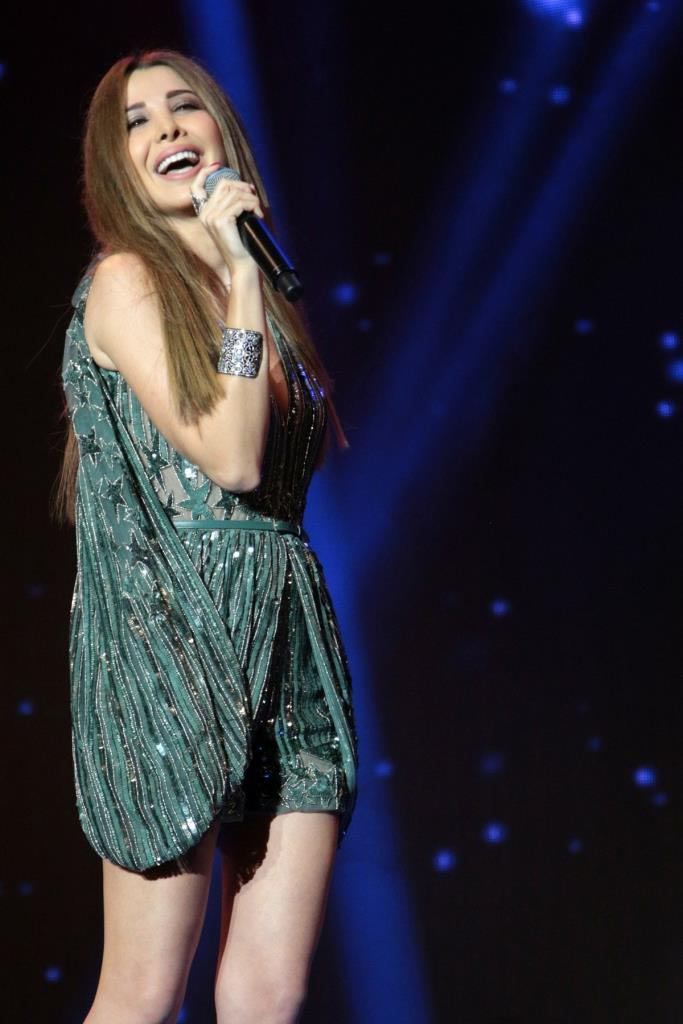
Ajram performing at the 2017 Dbayeh International Festival

On April 21, 2017, Ajram released her ninth studio album, Nancy 9 (Hassa Beek), through In2Musica. The album peaked at number one on the Hit Sorter's Best-Selling Albums Chart and remained atop for 16 continuous weeks since its release. The record topped Virgin Megastores sales in Lebanon for 4 continuous months, while in Egypt it remained atop for 15 continuous weeks, as well as in the KSA, the UAE and Bahrain. The album was supported by the release of two singles, including the lead single "Aam Betaala' Feek", which broke a new record as the fastest song to reach one million streams on Anghami. The song also received commercial success, topping several Arabic music charts and radio stations for consecutive weeks.

In the Arabic dub of "Power of Four," a one-hour special episode of The Powerpuff Girls, Ajram voices the fourth Powerpuff Girl, Bliss, who appears in the episode. "Power of Four" premiered on Cartoon Network MENA on November 9, 2017.

In 2018, Ajram became the first Lebanese singer to surpass 100 million views on YouTube with her song "Ya Banat" on an unofficial YouTube channel. In September 2018, she released the single "Badna Nwalee El Jaw" first on Anghami and then on her official YouTube channel. It was followed by another single "Albi Ya Albi" in January 2020. During the COVID-19 pandemic, Ajram performed in an exclusive live concert on YouTube in May 2020, titled Hope Beyond Borders. It was followed by another live concert on TikTok in September 2020, titled The 2020 Live Show. The event was scheduled to take place in August but was delayed due to the 2020 Beirut explosion.

Ajram marked Mother's Day by releasing the song "Emmi" in March 2021. Between May and July 2021, she released four promotional singles from her upcoming tenth album. The album titled Nancy 10 was released on July 10, 2021.

On 25 July 2022, Ajram's single "Sah Sah" became the first Arabic language song to enter Billboard's Dance/Electronic Songs featuring American DJ Marshmello.

Nancy Ajram released her eleventh studio album, Nancy 11, on July 17, 2025. A love letter to her husband, children, and her fans, the album includes 11 songs ranging from rhythmic to romantic and dramatic, reflecting the personal and media attention surrounding Ajram following the 2020 home intrusion incident and subsequent divorce rumors. It achieved strong chart success, reaching the top ten in Algeria, Bahrain, Egypt, Finland, Jordan, Kuwait, Lebanon, Oman, Qatar, Saudi Arabia, Tunisia, Turkmenistan, and Yemen, and peaking at number one in Algeria, Lebanon, Qatar, Saudi Arabia, and Yemen.

Shortly thereafter, on 5 November 2025, Ajram made history with her first-ever concert in Indonesia, performing at Istora Senayan Arena in Jakarta. The show drew thousands of fans, featured a rotating stage and a setlist of around 18 of her biggest hits, and even included a surprise duet with Indonesian star Ayu Ting Ting on “Ma Tegi Hena”. Media observers noted that this performance marked the first major concert in Southeast Asia by an Arab artist, further cementing Nancy Ajram’s status as an established international icon.

On 11 November 2025, Ajram released the music video for “Ya Albo”, which became the first single from the album. A month later, on 11 December, she released the music video for “Sidi Ya Sidi” as the second single from the album.

In May 2026, Ajram embarked on the Nancy 11 World Tour. The tour is expected to span five continents through July 2027.

== Personal life ==
Ajram began dating the well-known Lebanese dentist Fadi El Hachem in 2005, after knowing him for several years as his patient. The couple managed to keep the relationship from the public and maintain their privacy until being photographed together during a trip to Tunisia. After a three-year relationship, the two married in an intimate ceremony attended by their immediate family and close friends in Cyprus on September 1, 2008. On her 26th birthday, May 16, 2009, she gave birth to their first child, a daughter named Mila. Ajram released a song for her daughter, "Ya Rabi Tekbar Mila" on the same day. In a survey done by Rotana Magazine, Ajram was voted as the "Most Beautiful Mom" of 2009. Ajram kept her daughter Mila from the public until they both appeared on the cover of Prestige Magazine in an exclusive photoshoot. Mila later appeared in the set of Ajram's "Ya Kether" music video in the presence of the media who publicized her pictures. On April 23, 2011, she gave birth to her second daughter, Ella, and released a song for her titled "Hadri Laabek" on the same day. On January 30, 2019, she gave birth to her third daughter, Lya. Four days later, Ajram released a song titled "Lya" for her.

Ajram is one of the most followed Arab celebrities on social media.

== Philanthropy and humanitarian work ==
Ajram has participated in numerous charity events and concerts that she considers a priority in her music career. Ajram also released a song about peace, "Risala Lil Aalam" (A Message to the World), in her first children's album Shakhbat Shakhabit as a music video, which was rumored to be presented to the UNICEF. Ajram also participated among over 100 other prominent Arab artists in a huge operate called "Al Dhameer Al Arabi" (released on February 27, 2008), a 10-year sequel to "El Helm El Arabi" that outlines the major political events in the Arab world in the past ten years.

In June 2008, Ajram participated in The Big Ball, a charity event in Dubai which raised over Dhs 940,000 for helping underprivileged children by auctioning one of her favourite dresses and encouraging children's fund-raising events; she announced, "The Big Ball is doing a wonderful thing and I'm happy to support it. I'm coming for my love of children and because I want to help underprivileged children find a happy place in this world. Children inspired my latest album Shakhbat Shakhabit and especially the song "Risala lil Aalam" (A Message to the World)."

On October 22, 2009, the UNICEF chose Ajram to be the first female regional ambassador for the Middle East and North Africa, as was announced in a press conference held in Beirut. Ajram announced that she will be starting her charity projects in 2010. In late 2009 she appeared in the UNICEF's commercial marking the 20th anniversary of the Convention on the Rights of the Child, joining other influential Middle Eastern celebrities such as Kadim Al Sahir, Saber Rebai, Mahmoud Kabil, Khaled Abol Naga, Djamel Laroussi, Caresse Bashar, Fayez Al Malki and Iranian actress Mahtab Keramati.

In 2013, Ajram performed the theme song for Worth 100 Men ("Bmeet Ragel" in Arabic) – a radio fiction series produced by The Womanity Foundation, which focuses on women's education, training and development.

== Controversies ==
Ajram caused controversy in 2018 when her management team arrived during the Pride festival in Gothenburg and asked for all of the rainbow flags to be removed for her to perform. The Lebanese singer, Hamed Sinno criticized her on a Facebook post and said that they [Mashrou' Leila] played the festival opening while all the pride flags were up. Ajram later clarified through a tweet that it was neither her decision nor her management's to remove the pride flags, but rather the organizer's.

=== Trespassing incident ===
In the early hours of January 5, 2020, an armed trespasser named Mohamed Hassan Moussa broke into Ajram and her husband Fadi El Hachem's villa in Sehaileh, Keserwan District. During the break in Moussa was shot dead by El Hachem. Lebanese prosecutor Ghada Aoun later issued an arrest warrant for El Hachem and opened an investigation into the incident. Ajram herself sustained a minor injury to her right leg. On January 7, El Hachem was released from prison with prevention from travelling abroad until investigations were concluded. Ajram noted that her husband's "reaction to the killer was after intense threatening that took place for almost 6 to 7 minutes".

Local media sources reported that Moussa, who was born in 1989 in Basqala, Idlib Governorate, Syria, was married and was a father. He used to work as a gardener for El Hachem, and had confronted his previous employer with a fake unloaded gun, asking for his unpaid salary. However, Ajram denied both that they knew Moussa and that he worked for them.

The trespasser was seen masked on CCTV footage, and was recorded waiting outside for a couple of hours before entering the villa, despite the presence of bodyguards. Later, he pointed a gun at El Hachem before he entered the children's room. At this point, El Hachem claimed that he acted in self-defense and shot and killed the trespasser. According to the forensic pathology report, Moussa was shot 17 times with a Glock 17 pistol: once in the right forearm, twice in the left shoulder, once under the left armpit, three shots in the chest, two shots in the abdomen, seven shots in the back, and one shot in the left thigh. In the meantime, Ajram was hiding in the bathroom while calling her father. The family of the trespasser initially refused to take his body from the hospital, since El Hachem was released from custody before burial, which contradicts their traditions; however, they took his body to be buried in Damascus as investigations were announced to continue.

On November 24, 2020, El Hachem was charged with intentional murder; however, it was considered as a legitimate act of self-defense. On February 13, 2023, a local court issued a decision clearing El Hachem from murder charges, as the family of the trespasser claimed that the latter should be liable to pay compensations. On October 2, 2023, the Court of Cassation issued its final verdict, clearing El Hachem from all charges.

== Discography ==
Studio albums

- Mihtagalak (1998)
- Sheel Oyoonak Anni (2001)
- Ya Salam (2003)
- Ah W Noss (2004)
- Ya Tabtab...Wa Dallaa (2006)
- Shakhbat Shakhabit (2007)
- Betfakkar Fi Eih (2008)
- Nancy 7 (2010)
- Super Nancy (2012)
- Nancy 8 (2014)
- Nancy 9 (Hassa Beek) (2017)
- Nancy 10 (2021)
- Nancy 11 (2025)

== Videography ==
List of music videos
Year	Title	Album	Music Composer	Director
1997	"Oulha Kelma"	Non-album single	Samir Qibty	Ali El Darzi
1998	"Mihtagalak"	Mihtagalak	Shaker El Mogy	Elie Feghali
2001	"Sheel Oyoonak Anni"	Sheel Oyoonak Anni	Zayen Fares	Guy Zahlan
2002	"Akhasmak Ah"	Ya Salam	Mohamed Saad	Nadine Labaki
2003	"Ya Salam"	Ya Salam	Tarek Madkour	Nadine Labaki
2003	"Yay (Sehr Oyoono)"	Ya Salam	Samir Sifir	Nadine Labaki
2004	"Ah W Noss"	Ah W Noss	Tarek Madkour	Nadine Labaki
2004	"Lawn Ouyounak"	Ah W Noss	Tarek Abou Jawdeh	Nadine Labaki
2005	"Oul Tani Keda"	Ah W Noss	Mohamed Saad	Luca Tommassini
2005	"Inta Eih"	Ah W Noss	Samir Sifir	Nadine Labaki
2006	"Ya Tabtab...Wa Dallaa"	Ya Tabtab...Wa Dallaa	Tarek Madkour	Nadine Labaki
2006	"Moegaba"	Ya Tabtab...Wa Dallaa	Walid Saad	Harry Rankin and Mike Lipscombe
2006	"Ana Yalli Bhebbak"	Ya Tabtab...Wa Dallaa	Tarek Madkour	Pascale D'Ash
2006	"Ehsas Jdeed"	Ya Tabtab...Wa Dallaa	Selima Salama	Said El Marouk
2007	"Elli Kan"	Ya Tabtab...Wa Dallaa	Walid Saad	Diamantino Ferreira
2007	"Mishtaga Leik"	Ya Tabtab...Wa Dallaa	Yaacoub Al Khoubaizi	Mirna Khayat
2007	"Shakhbat Shakhabit" (ft. Katkouta, Shater, Eid Milad)	Shakhbat Shakhabit [Children's Album]	Walid Saad	Said El Marouk
2008	"Risala Ilal Aalam"	Shakhbat Shakhabit [Children's Album]	Walid Saad	Fadi Haddad
2008	"Betfakkar Fi Eih"	Betfakkar Fi Eih	Mohamed El-Nadi	Said El Marouk
2008	"Min Dally Nseek"	Betfakkar Fi Eih	Walid Saad	Said El Marouk
2009	"Lamset Eed"	Betfakkar Fi Eih	Selim Salama	Leila Kanaan
2009	"Ibn El Giran"	Betfakkar Fi Eih	Mohamed Rahim	Mike Harris
2009	"Mashi Haddi"	Betfakkar Fi Eih	Selim Salama	Leila Kanaan
2010	"Shaggaa' Be Alamak" (Wavin' Flag) (feat. K'naan)	Non-album single	Bruno Mars, Philip Lawrence	Codirector: Leila Kanaan
2010	"Fi Hagat"	Nancy 7	Mohamed Rahim	Nadine Labaki
2010	"Sheikh El Shabab"	Nancy 7	Selim Salama	Leila Kanaan
2011	"Ya Kether"	Nancy 7	Samir Sifir	Sophie Boutros
2012	"Super Nancy" (ft. "Ya Banat", "Baousi", "Stoohi")	Super Nancy [Children's Album]	Walid Saad	Leila Kanaan
2012	"Badak Teb'a Fik"	Non-album single	Ziad Burji	Waleed Nassif
2013	"Aamel Aekla"	Non-album single	Ziad Burji	Amir Ta'ema
2014	"Ma Tegi Hena"	Nancy 8	Walid Saad	Joe Bou Eid
2014	"Shaggaa Helmak" (feat. Cheb Khaled)	Non-album single	Hussien El Shafei	Jeff T. Thomas
2014	"Moush Far'a Ktir"	Nancy 8	Rami Gamal	Said El Marouk
2014	"Ma Aw'edak Ma Ghir"	Nancy 8	Talal	Fadi Haddad
2014	"Yalla"	Nancy 8	Mohamed Yehia	Angy Jammal
2015	"W Bkoun Jayi Wade'ak"	Nancy 8	Yahia Hassan	Fadi Haddad
2017	"Hassa Beek"	Nancy 9	Khaled Ezz	Leila Kanaan
2018	"W Maak"	Nancy 9	Mohamed Yehia	Leila Kanaan
2018	"Badna Nwalee El Jaw"	Non-album single	Joseph Jouha	Samir Syriani
2019	"El Hob Zay El Watar"	Nancy 9	Walid Saad	Leila Kanaan
2020	"Albi Ya Albi"	Non-album single	Nabil Khouri	Raja Nehme
2020	"Ila Beirut Al Ontha"	Non-album single	Hesham Boules	Samir Syriani
2021	"Emmi"	Non-album single	Yahia Hassan	Samir Syriani
2021	"Salamat"	Nancy 10	Mohamed Yehia	Samir Syriani
2021	"Miyye W Khamsin"	Nancy 10	Nabil Khouri	Leila Kanaan
2022	"Ma Te'tezer"	Nancy 10	Nabil Khouri	Samir Syriani
2022	"Sah Sah" (with Marshmello)	Non-album single	Ahmed Alaa	Sarah McColgan
2022	"Aala Shanak"	Nancy 10	Belal Sorour	Leila Kanaan
2022	"Ya Eid"	Non-album single	Selim Assaf	Samir Syriani
2023	"Baddi Hada Hebbou"	Nancy 10	Ziad Bourji	Samir Syriani
2023	"Tegy Nenbeset"	Non-album single	Aziz El Shafei	Leila Kanaan
2024	"Meshkeltak Alwahidi"	Nancy 10	Ayman Koumayha	Hass Ghaddar
2024	"Men Nazra"	Non-album single	Ziad Jamal	Samir Syriani
2025	"Toul Omri Negma"	Non-album single	Mohamed Rahim	Richa Sarkis
2025	"Warana Eh"	Non-album single	Mohamed Yahia	Eli Rezkallah
2025	"Ya Albo"	Nancy 11	Attar	Samir Syriani
2025	"Sidi Ya Sidi"	Nancy 11	Attar	Raja Nehme
2026	"Shhadi Ya Deni"	Non-album single	Karim Abdo	Angy Akly Jammal
2026	"Bastafizzak"	Non-album single	Aziz Elshafei	Joe Bou Eid

== Awards and titles ==
Year	Title	Awarded By	Ref.
1995	Gold Medal in the Tarab category	Noujoum Al-Moustakbal	
2003	Best Arab Singer	Video Clip Festival	
2003	Best Music Video – "Akhasmak Ah"	Video Clip Festival	
2003	Best Female Lebanese Singer	Murex d'Or	
2003	Best Music Video – "Ya Salam"	Murex d'Or	
2003	Youngest Arab Singer (Sponsored by Horreyati Magazine)	The Golden Lion Award	
2003	Honor Award	LG Music Award	
2003	Best Female Arab Singer	Zahrat Al Khaleej Magazine	
2004	Best Female Lebanese Singer	Murex d'Or	
2004	Best Female Arab Singer	Arabian Music Awards	
2004	Best Female Arab Singer	Zahrat Al Khaleej Magazine	
2004	Best Music Video – "Lawn Ouyounak"	Zahrat Al Khaleej Magazine	
2005	Most Influential Arab Personalities	Newsweek	
2005	Best Female Arab Artist	Dear Guest Awards	
2005	Honor Award	Opera House of Egypt	
2006	Most Popular Singer	Murex d'Or	
2006	Best Music Video – "Ehsas Jdeed"	Murex d'Or	
2007	Certificate	Pope of Rome	
2007	Most Influential Contemporary Female Singer and One of World's Most Influential Arabs	Arabian Business	
2007	Honor Award	LG Music Award	
2007	Best Female Arab Singer	Mobinil Music Awards	
2007	Best Arab Star (Survey)	Kul al-Arab	
2008	Best Female Lebanese Singer (Student Choice Award)	LAU (Lebanese American University)	
2008	Best Female Arab Star	Al Gomhuria	
2008	World's Best-Selling Middle Eastern Artist – Betfakkar Fi Eih	World Music Awards	
2008	Best Female Arab singer (Survey)	Al Jazirah	
2009	Most Influential Contemporary Female Singer and One of World's Most Influential Arabs	Arabian Business	
2009	Best Female Arab singer (Survey)	Al Jazirah	
2010	Best Female World singer	World Travel Awards	
2010	Best Music Video – "Lamset Eed"	Murex d'Or	
2010	Best Arab Female Singer (Survey)	Panet Website	
2010	Best Arab Female Singer	Arab Sounds Awards	
2010	Best Album – Nancy 7	LBC	
2010	Best Music Video – "Fi Hagat"	LBC	
2010	Best Arabic Album – Nancy 7	Panorama FM	
2010	Best Selling Female Artist of the Decade	Stars Cafe Magazine Awards	
2010	Best Female Artist	Stars Cafe Magazine Awards	
2010	Best Album – Nancy 7	Stars Cafe Magazine Awards	
2010	Best Song – "Fi Hagat"	Stars Cafe Magazine Awards	
2010	Best Lyrics – "Fi Hagat"	Stars Cafe Magazine Awards	
2010	Best Music Arrangement – "Fi Hagat"	Stars Cafe Magazine Awards	
2010	Best Music Video – "Sheikh El Shabab"	Stars Cafe Magazine Awards	
2010	Best Music Video – "Fi Hagat"	Zahrat Al Khaleej Magazine	
2010	Best Female Singer	Jaras Scoop FM Awards	
2010	Best Female Singer	Melody FM Awards	
2011	Best Female Lebanese Singer	Murex d'Or	
2011	Best Music Video "Sheikh El Shabab"	Murex d'Or	
2011	Best Female Singer	Woujouh Men Lebnan Awards	
2011	Most Famous Celebrity in the Middle East	Arabian Business	
2011	Best Music Video "Sheikh El Shabab"	Middle East Music Awards (MEMA)	
2011	Best Music Video "Ya Kether"	Stars Cafe Magazine Awards	
2011	World's Best-Selling Middle Eastern Artist – Nancy 7	World Music Awards	
2012	Best Arab Female Singer	Panet Website	
2012	Best Female Artist	What's Up on OTV	
2013	Best Female Artist	Oscar El Noujoum	
2013	Most Popular Singer	Murex d'Or	
2014	World's Best-Selling Middle Eastern Artist – Nancy 8	World Music Awards	
2014	Ma Tegi Hena – Year's most played and steamed song	The Official Lebanese Top 20	
2014	Best Female Lebanese Singer	Murex d'Or	
2015	Career Honor Award	BIAF (Beirut International Awards Festival)	
2015	Best Arab Female Singer	Panet Website	
2015	Best Music Video – "Ma Awedak"	Murex d'Or	
2015	Most Popular Music Video – "Ma Tegi Hena"	Murex d'Or	
2016	Best Lebanese Song – "Maakoul El Gharam"	Murex d'Or	
2016	Surpassing 100 Million Streams	Anghami	
2016	Best Arab female singer	Panet Website	
2017	Best Female Lebanese Singer	Murex d'Or	
2017	Top Female Arab Celebrity	Forbes	
2017	Surpassing One Million Subscribers	YouTube	
2017	Most Streamed Song – "Aam Betaala' Feek"	Anghami	
2017	Most Streamed Artist	Anghami	
2017	Most Streamed Album – Nancy 9	Anghami	
2018	Best Female Lebanese Singer	Murex d'Or	
2018	Best Album – Nancy 9	Murex d'Or	
2018	Best Celebrity	Middle East Social Media Festival	
2018	Best Arab Singer of 2017	Arab Nation Music Awards	
2018	Best Levant Song of 2017 – "Aam Betaala' Feek"	Arab Nation Music Awards	
2018	Most Streamed and Downloaded Song of 2017 – "Aam Betaala' Feek"	Arab Nation Music Awards	
2018	Social Media Star	Arab Nation Music Awards	
2018	Best Lebanese Song of 2018 – "Badna Nwallee El Jaw"	MBC/Panorama Fm Awards 2018	
2019	Best Arab Female Singer	Oscar Sayidati Magazine	
2021	Best Music Video – "Ila Beirut Al Ontha"	Murex d'Or	
2022	Best Female Singer	ET Bil Arabi Awards	
2022	Best Music Video – "Salamat"	ET Bil Arabi Awards	
2022	Best Song – "Salamat"	Joy Awards	
2023	Best Music Video – "Aala Shanak"	Murex d'Or	
2024	Best Female Artist - Levantine Songs Category	Billboard Arabia Music Awards	
2025	Best Arabic Female Singer	Dear Guest Award	
2025	Album Of The Year - Nancy 11	People Bil Arabi Awards	
2026	Favorite Female Singer - Nancy 11	Joy Awards	
2026	Best Music Video - "Ya Albo"	Murex d'Or	
