= Nancy 8 =

Studio album by Nancy Ajram
- Released: March 21, 2014
- Recorded: 2011–2013
- Studio: Various: TK (Cairo); Hadi Sharara (Beirut); Joe Baroudjian (Beirut); Leila (Cairo); Sout El Hob (Cairo); M. Sound (Cairo)
- Genre: Arabic Pop; World; R&B; Techno; Dance Pop; Ballad; Pop rock
- Length: 61:02
- Label: In2Musica
- Producer: Various: Jiji Lamara (exec.); Nancy Ajram (exec.); Tarek Madkour; Bassem Rizk; Hussam Kamil; Ahmed Ibrahim; Hadi Sharara; Khaled Nabil; Tarek Aakef; Mohamed El Shaer; Muhannad Khoder

Nancy Ajram chronology
Super Nancy (2012)	Nancy 8 (2014)	Nancy 9 (Hassa Beek) (2017)

Singles from Nancy 8
- 1. "Ma Tegi Hena" Released: March 9, 2014; 2. "Mouch Far'a Kteer" Released: May 28, 2014; 3. "Ma Awedak" Released: August 9, 2014; 4. "Yalla" Released: October 23, 2014; 5. "W Bkoun Jayi Wadeak" Released: February 23, 2015

Nancy 8 (also stylized as N #8) is the eighth studio album by Lebanese singer Nancy Ajram. It was released on March 21, 2014, by In2Musica nearly four years after the release and international success of her seventh studio album Nancy 7. Like her previous albums, Ajram collaborated with several producers, including Tarek Madkour, Hadi Sharara and Ahmed Ibrahim, along with new collaborations with Hussam Kamil, Khaled Nabil and Muhannad Khoder. The music of 8 features R&B, ballad, pop rock and dance-pop styles in order to emphasize the singer's vocal abilities.

8 received mixed to positive reviews from music critics. Commercially, it became Ajram's eighth album to reach number one in the Arab World. In order to promote the record, "Ma Tegi Hena" was released as the album's lead single on March 9, 2014, going number one all over the Middle East.

== Promotion and release ==
In mid 2013, Ajram announced via social media that her eighth studio album would be released sometime during the year, serving as the follow-up to her seventh studio album Nancy 7 (2010). However, the album was later scheduled for November. In January 2014, 10-second snippets of the album tracks were leaked online. After a long wait, Ajram finally revealed via social media the new album title and its artwork on February 5, saying: "Happy to reveal to you the album cover..be ready for the songs' samples in a few". One week later, the video teaser of the long-awaited "Ma Tegi Hena" was released. On March 9, the new album was listed for pre-order to be available on March 21. Lebanese streets were filled with the album billboards in early March. After three and a half long years, the wait is finally over, Nancy 8 was digitally released worldwide on March 21, simultaneously with the physical release in MENA region.

== Style and composition ==
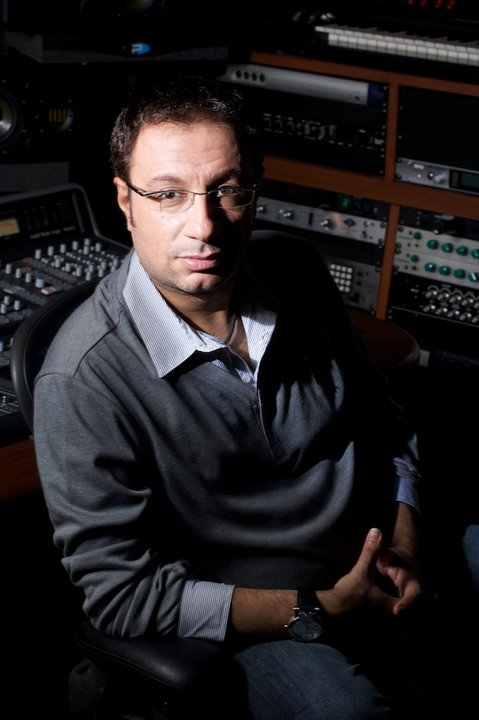
Tarek Madkour, produced three tracks in the album including the lead single.

The opening track and lead single, "Ma Tegi Hena" returns Ajram to her original Egyptian folk sound she became popular with in the early 2000s with her worldwide phenomena "Akhasmak Ah." Ajram later based most of her career's successes on that of the latter hit, taking on its sound as her signature style with later hits like "Ah W Nos" and "Ya Tabtab". "Mouch Far'a Kteer" is a breakup ballad featuring a Pop rock beat and empowering lyrics thematically referring to rising up from heartbreak and agony. "Men El Yawm" was described as "the wedding song" and is sung in Lebanese dialect very reminiscent of 2004 hit "Lawn Ouyounak." The song is about marriage and unity in love. "Yalla", a standout party track, is an encouraging anthem about falling in love which incorporates foreign Pop sounds. "Tisabeg El Rih" is a traditional love song inspired from Khaliji singing gatherings, in which Nancy has taken part of in collaboration with MBC Group. "Rahent Aleik" is a breakup ballad with elements of R&B. "Shou Hal Ossa" is an EDM-inspired love song, which may be Ajram's most experimental song to date, featuring elements of pop and techno, merged with Arabian instruments and sounds. "Nam Bi Albi" speaks of love, while "Etnen Souhab" is an attempt of healing after heartbreak. "Ma Awedak" is a moody traditional Khaliji song with heavier instrumentation from the Persian Gulf. "Ba'a Kol Da" is a deeply regretful song about the inability of life without the presence of a lover who is away. "Fakra Zaman" is a cheerful youth anthem with a hint of sadness for the old days of childhood and teenage and how they were spent, and the effect of this concept of Ajram's way of thinking in the present.

== Singles ==
- "Ma Tegi Hena" was released as the album's lead single on March 9, 2014, its music video is set to premiere on March 21 along with the album's release. The song was well received by music critics who compared it to "Akhasmak Ah," Ajram's breakthrough single. The song became the fastest selling Arabic song in iTunes history, beating Ahmed Chawki's "Habibi I Love You". The song quickly became a number-one hit in several Arabic music charts including Arabic Year End Chart of The Official Lebanese Top 20 as the most streamed song in Lebanon for 2014.
- "Mouch Far'a Kteer" was released as the album's second single on May 28, 2014. The song reached the top ten in several Arab countries including Lebanon. The 7-minute music video for the song, which was directed by Said El Marouk, premiered on May 20 exclusively in Cinema City in Beirut, followed by official release on YouTube and TV channels on May 28. In this video, Ajram tries to get over her ex-boyfriend who cheated on her, during the video she remembers their good times together but eventually makes the decision to break up and gives him his stuff back.
- "Ma Awedak" was released as the album's third offering from the album on August 9, 2014. The song received positive reviews from music critics. It also had chart success especially in Gulf countries. The music video for the song, directed by Fadi Haddad, was filmed in December 2013. The story revolves around a royal love-story between two princes in a palace where they had grown up together. The video was released on August 9, 2014, concurrently with its single release.
- "Yalla" was announced as the album's fourth single on October 23, 2014. It topped Anghami's Top Arabic chart for 12 consecutive weeks. The music video was directed by Angy Jammal as the first collaboration with Ajram. It earnestly recaptured the superstar's youthful girl-next-door image that shot her to worldwide fame. "Yalla" can be described as Hannah Montana in a nutshell. Ajram plays a high school student leading a double life, when she is not having a crush on one hunky curly-haired boy during the day, she is the superstar Nancy by night. As events unfold, her crush invites her out on their first date to a Nancy concert. Undercover Nancy ends up attending the concert with her hot date, while the event organizer frantically searches for the leading lady of the night.
- "W Bkoun Jayi Wadeak" served as the fifth single from the album. The official music video of the song, directed by Fadi Haddad, was released on February 23, 2015.

== Ma Tegi Hena music video ==
Ajram performs Arabic freestyle oriental dance to her customers.

=== Development and content ===
The music video for "Ma Tegi Hena" was directed by Joe Bou Eid. It was filmed on September 30 and October 1, 2013, between Sin El Fil, Jezzine and Sidon in Lebanon. The video premiered on March 21, 2014, at 12:00 a.m. on Arabica TV. The video opens with Ajram, the watermelon merchant, performing Arabic freestyle oriental dance moves to her customers and rubs her body against that of Mister Lebanon winner Ayman Moussa, who plays a police officer, causing a commotion in the market. The next scene shows Ajram coming across an accident, which causes a road traffic, then the policeman comes and arrests her and eventually she somehow manages to escape.

=== Reception ===
The video generated controversy and criticized for its sexual imagery, presenting Ajram's old seductive public image, eliminating her "girl next door" image. Many critics compared the video to her breakthrough hit, "Akhasmak Ah". The conservative crew also have cast a very critical opinion on the provocative piece. Ajram, however, refused to admit her music video is scandalous in the least, defending in a radio interview:

I don't see what I presented as being seductive, and at the end of the day each person is entitled to their own opinion. There are people who watched the clip and did not understand its story and only concentrated on my appearance.

According to Laha Magazine, she added:

The clip really makes me laugh because it is like a short film about a character that is only concerned with selling watermelons to make a living. I always make it a point that any clip I film tells a story, I don't fool people with clips that are merely lipsing and a show of new looks, hair and makeup.

Despite the criticism for Ajram's return to a seductive and sexual appeal, the video broke YouTube records as the fastest viewed Arabic music video of all time, collecting over a million views in less than 24 hours.

== Commercial performance ==
Nancy 8 debuted at number one on the Best-Selling Albums Chart of HitSorter and stayed atop for continuous weeks. It also debuted at number 10 on the Billboard World Albums chart. The album was 2014's highest debut for a female album in the Middle East. As a result, Ajram received World Music Award as the best-selling Middle Eastern Live Act. Nancy 8 topped Virgin Megastores sales in the Arab world for 9 continuous weeks, then remained among the Top 10 highest-selling albums for non-continuous weeks.

== Critical reception ==
The reception to Nancy 8 was mixed to positive.

Bitajarod website gave the album a positive review, saying Ajram "created, excelled, won and refreshed the music scene with an artistic bomb with which she rebelled with performance and emotion".

Lone Reviewer website gave a mixed review to the album, saying "Overall just above-average album from Nancy, some good songs but I expected better." The website criticized the lack of coherence and of inspiration in this album.

== Track listing ==
The track list was announced via iTunes on March 9, 2014.

Standard edition

No.	Title	Lyrics	Music	Producer	Length
1.	"Ma Tegi Hena" (Come Here)	Ayman Bahgat Amar	Walid Saad	Tarek Madkour	4:12
2.	"Mouch Far'a Ktir" (It Doesn't Matter)	Amir Teima	Rami Gamal	Tarek Madkour	5:00
3.	"Men el Yawm (Shrek Beomry)" (From Now (My Life Partner))	Marcel Mdawar	Rawad Raad	Bassem Rizk	3:40
4.	"Yalla" (Come on)	Ayman Bahgat Amar	Mohammed Yehia	Tarek Madkour	3:53
5.	"Tesabeg El Rih" (Racing the Wind)	Al Wissam	Samir Sfeir	Hussam Kamil	3:21
6.	"Rahent Aleik" (I Bet On You)	Mohammed Rifai	Mohammed Rifai; Ahmed Ibrahim	Ahmed Ibrahim	4:07
7.	"Shou Hal Ossa" (What a Story)	Nizar Francis	Samir Sfeir	Hadi Sharara	4:17
8.	"Nam Bi Albi" (Sleep in My Heart)	Samir Nakhleh	Nabil Ajram	Hadi Sharara	3:57
9.	"Etnen Souhab" (Two Friends)	Mohammed El Bougha	Mahmoud Khiyami	Khaled Nabil	4:11
10.	"Ma Awedak" (I Can't Promise)	Mubarak el Houdebi	Talal	Tarek Aakef	4:45
11.	"W Bkoun Jayi Wadeak" (I Come to Say Goodbye)	Kamal Kubaissy	Yehia El Hassan	Bassem Rizk	3:35
12.	"Ba'a Kol Da" (After All That)	Ehab Abdou	Ghazi El Ayadi	Bassem Rizk	3:53
13.	"Fakra Zaman" (I Still Remember)	Mohammed Waziri	Mohammed Waziri	Mohammed El Shaer	4:05
14.	"Ya Khayen" (Traitor)	Marcel Mdawar	Ghazi El Ayadi	Bassem Rizk	3:34
15.	"Bel Raha" (Easy On Me)	Ahmad Alawi	Issam Kamal	Muhannad Khoder	3:56
Total length:					61:02

Notes:

- The song is officially referred to by two different titles in the album's liner notes.

== Personnel ==
Adapted from the album liner notes.

- Ahmed Ragab – bass (tracks 1,2,6,9)
- Amr Tantawy – guitar (track 1)
- Ahmed Ayadi – tabla (tracks 1,9,12)
- Hisham El Arabi – riq (track 1)
- Tarek Madkour – producer; mixing (tracks 1,2,4); keyboards and drums programming (tracks 1,4); synth bass (track 4)
- Yehia EL Mougy – strings writing and conducting (track 2)
- Ousso Lotfy – guitar (track 2)
- Raymond El Hajj – percussion (tracks 3,11)
- Elie Barbar – mastering; mixing engineer (tracks 3,7,8,11,12,14)
- Tamer Ghonim – strings conducting (tracks 3,9,11,12,14)
- Mostafa Aslan – guitar (tracks 3,6,9,10,11,12,14)
- Mostafa Abbas – snare drum (track 4)
- Sherif Said – guitar (track 4)
- Hussam Kamil – producer; mixing engineer (track 5)
- Said Kamal – strings writing (track 6)
- Mohammed Sakr – mixing engineer (tracks 6,13)
- Mohammed Ismail – strings conducting (track 6)
- Farouk Mohammed Hasan – accordion (tracks 9,11,12)
- Khaled Raouf – mixing engineer (track 9)
- Ahmed Khairy – ney (track 9)
- Hisham El Arabi – riq (tracks 9,12)
- Amin Aakef – mixing (track 10)
- Omar Hashem – engineer (track 10)
- Ahmad Al Anwah – percussion (track 10)
- Ismail – buzuq (track 10)
- Aytaç Doğan – qanun (track 10)
- Reda Bedair – ney (tracks 10,12)
- Zaid Al Jilani – Artistic supervision (track 10)
- Maged Souror – qanun (track 12)
- Khaled Sinno – vocal assistant engineering (track 13)
- Tony Anka – percussion (track 14)
- Ali Mazbouh – solo mizmar (track 14)
- Mohammed Esmat – engineer (track 15)
- Jassem Mohammed – mixing (track 15)
- Samir Al Qattan – percussion (track 15)
- Rocket – guitar (track 15)
- David Abdallah – photography
- Aida El Zeenny – photography
- Marlene El Hachem – graphic design
- Fendi – dressing
- Lana El Sahely – styling
- Fady Kataya – make-up
- Wassim Morkos – hair dressing

== Release history ==
Region	Date	Format(s)	Edition(s)	Label(s)	Ref.
Worldwide	March 21, 2014	Digital Download	Standard	In2Musica	
Middle East	March 21, 2014	CD; Digital Download	Standard	In2Musica; Arabic Music; Platinum Records; Music Misr	

== Awards and nominations ==
2014 World Music Awards
Year	Nominee / work	Award	Result
2014	Nancy Ajram	Best Selling Middle Eastern Artist (Nancy 8)	Won

Murex d'Or
Year	Nominee / work	Award	Result
2014	Nancy Ajram	Best Lebanese Female Singer	Won
2015	"Ma Awedak"	Best Music Video	Won
2015	"Yalla"	Best Music Video	Nominated
2015	"Ma Tegi Hena"	Most Popular Music Video	Won
