= Leila Kanaan =

Lebanese director and filmmaker

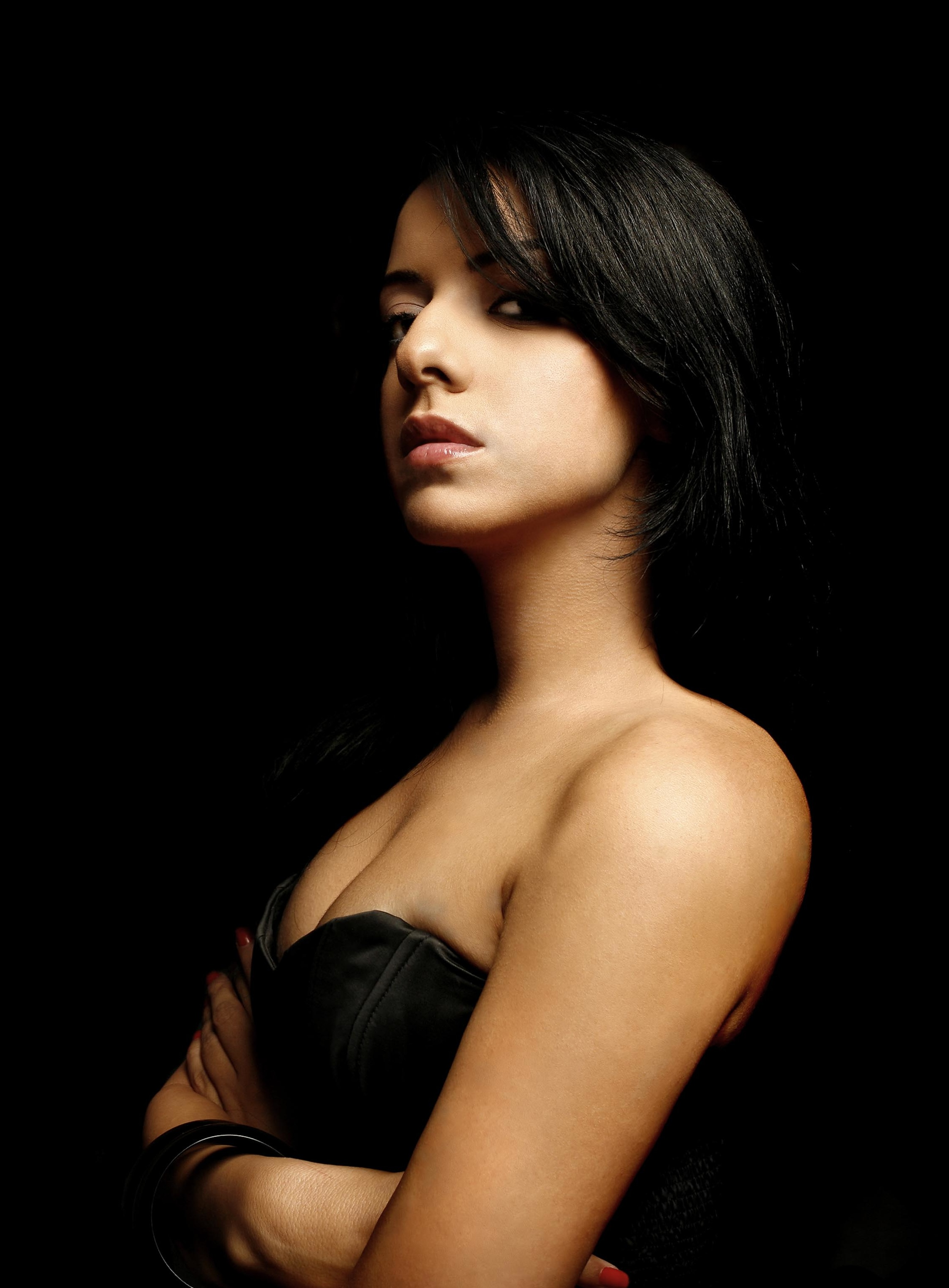
Leila Kanaan in 2006

Leila Kanaan (Arabic: ليلى كنعان) is a Lebanese music video director and filmmaker. She has worked with famous Arab singers such as Nancy Ajram, Cheb Khaled, Rashed el Majed, Haifa Wehbe, Yara, Diana Haddad, Khaled and Myriam Fares.

== Personal life ==
Kanaan married Wadih Safieddine on 30 July 2011.

== Works ==
=== Music videos ===
- “Sayyad”- Bashar Darwish - 2004
- “Mensafer” – Issa Ghandour – 2004
- “Waynik” – Joe Ashkar – 2005
- “Al Khata” – Rashed Al Fares – 2005
- “Bahebbak” – Ayman Al Atar – 2005
- “Twassa Fey” – Yara – 2005
- “Bahebak wa Dari” – Madeleine Matar – 2005
- “Mas & Louly” – Diana Haddad & Khaled – 2006
- “Aadi” – Diana Haddad – 2006
- “Friendship” – Johnson & Johnson – 2006
- “Ma T’oulch Lhad” – Haifa Wehbe – 2006
- “Kelmet Hob” – Sofia Marrikh – 2007
- “Mosh Ananiya” – Myriam Fares – 2008
- “Enta Menni” – Yara – 2008
- “Baba Fen/Lamma Shams Trawwa” – Haifa Wehbe – 2008 (Winner of Murex d'Or 2009 and Middle East Music Award 2009)
- “Lamset Eid” - Nancy Ajram - 2009 (Winner of Murex d'Or 2009)
- "Mashi Haddi" - Nancy Ajram - 2009
- "Al Maw3ad Al dae3" - Rashed el Majed and Yara - 2009
- "Ayez Aghanny" - Karim Wagdy"- 2010
- “Sukkar Ziyada” - Yara - 2010
- “Wavin' Flag” - K'naan featuring Nancy Ajram - 2010
- "Sheikh El Shabab" - Nancy Ajram - 2010 (Winner of Murex d'Or 2010 and the Middle East Music Awards 2010)
- “Super Nancy” - Nancy Ajram - 2012 (Voted Video of the year 2012 on Music Nation Digital Magazine )
- “Hassa Beek” - Nancy Ajram - 2017
- “W Maak” - Nancy Ajram - 2018
- “El Hob Zay El Watar” - Nancy Ajram - 2019
- “Miyye w Khamsin” - Nancy Ajram - 2021
- “Aala Shanak” - Nancy Ajram - 2022

=== Films ===
- “My Father's House” – Short film, 26 min – 2003
- “After the Storm” – Short film, 5min – 2006
