= Super Nancy =

Studio album by Nancy Ajram
- Released: September 13, 2012
- Recorded: 2011–2012
- Studio: Leila (Cairo); Sout El Hob (Cairo); Wassim Bustani (Beirut); Audio Vision (Beirut)
- Genre: Arabic Pop; World
- Length: 27:59
- Label: In2Musica; Arabica Music; Rotana
- Producer: Jiji Lamara (exec.); Nancy Ajram (exec.); Tooma; Osama El Hendy; Wassim Bustani

Nancy Ajram chronology
Nancy 7 (2010)	Super Nancy (2012)	Nancy 8 (2014)

Singles from Super Nancy
- 1. "Ya Banat" Released: September 10, 2012; 2. "Baousi" Released: September 19, 2012; 3. "Stoohi" Released: September 19, 2012

Super Nancy is the second children's album by Lebanese recording artist Nancy Ajram. It was released on September 13, 2012 by In2Musica, Rotana and Arabica Music. Following the critical success of her debut album Shakhbat Shakhabit, which was also exclusively oriented toward kids, Ajram decided to dedicate another record to them to show appreciation for their loyalty to her. The singer worked with several past collaborators she worked with in the previous kids album, while enlisting new ones. Super Nancy was well received by music critics. Three singles, which featured in the music video, were released in September 2012 from the album: "Ya Banat", "Stoohi", and "Baousi". "Ya Banat" received more than 300 million views on YouTube so far, making it one of the most-listened Arab songs of all time.

== Development and release ==
The desire to make "Super Nancy" came especially from my two little girls that I adore, Mila and Ella, who made me fall into the fascinating world of childhood all over again and to whom I would like to dedicate this album, just like I wanted to share the set with them while shooting scenes of the wonderful "Super Nancy" music video. I hope this album will be souvenir for them and that they will hold it in their hands later with much love and tenderness.

I would like to dedicate this album to all the children of the world and all my precious Super Fans: I hope I have managed inject some magic, hope and fantasy into your lives and draw a continuous smile on your faces.

Keep dreaming, be happy and be proud of the child in you!

I love you very much.

Nancy.

During the preparations for her seventh studio album Nancy 7 (2010), Egyptian composer, Walid Saad, offered "Ya Banat" to Ajram, and here she began considering a new album for kids. In early 2011, Ajram announced that she began preparing for the album. On June 6, 2012, Ajram tweeted that the album will be titled Super Nancy, and was initially scheduled for release at the end of month. On August 16, 2012, Ajram gave the first preview of the album during "Ana Wel Assal" TV show, when she sang parts of the lead song, "Ya Banat". A few days later, billboards featuring the album cover filled the streets in Lebanon, and it was then scheduled for release after Eid al-Fitr in late August, but due to delays in filming the music video, a later release date was set. "Ya Banat", the album's lead single, was sent to radios to premiere on September 10. The album was officially released worldwide on September 13.

The music video for Super Nancy, which features a medley of 3 songs from the album, was directed by renowned Lebanese director Leila Kanaan with a budget exceeding $350,000. filming took place between south of Lebanon and a studio in Beirut for four days. Ajram's daughters Mila and Ella were featured in the video. The video premiered on TV six days after the album release, on September 19, 2012.

== Critical reception ==
Professional ratings
Review scores
Source	Rating
MBC	5/5 stars
Rotana	A+
Lebanon Files	(very positive)
HitMarker	(positive)

Super Nancy has been lauded by contemporary music critics, many of whom have praised the song productions and the outstanding vocal performance by Nancy. Lebanon Files gave the album a positive review by adding "... With the end of the year and the beginning of a new year, and in a comprehensive look at what made by Nancy Ajram, we realize that it really deserves the title of 'Super Nancy.' In order to avoid any 'explosion,' has fed the blasts, we will leave this title for her own children and call Nancy Ajram, because her meeting Superstar Ragheb Alama in "Arab Idol" will generate an explosion (as expected).

== Commercial performance ==
Super Nancy debuted at number one on the Best-Selling Albums Chart of HitMarker and stayed atop for continuous weeks. The album topped Virgin Megastores sales in the Arab world, then remained among the Top 10 highest-selling albums for non-continuous weeks. Super Nancy was voted "Video of The Year 2012" and "Album of The Year 2012" on Music Nation website.

== Track listing ==
Standard edition

No.	Title	Length
1.	"Ya Banat" (Oh, Girls)	3:12
2.	"Bo' El Katkout" (The Chick's Mouth)	3:13
3.	"Baousi" (I See You - Hide And Seek)	2:50
4.	"Sana Helwa Ya Gameel" (Happy Birthday, Beautiful)	4:01
5.	"Stoohi" (A cartoon character)	3:51
6.	"Oulo Hela (El Nageh)" (Say 'Hela' (The Successful))	4:06
7.	"Wez Einak" (Seethe)	3:13
8.	"Adi El Beida" (Here Is The Egg)	3:33
Total length:		27:59

== Credits ==
Tracks 1,2,5,8 - Lyrics: Nabil Khalaf, Music: Walid Saad, Production: Tooma

Tracks 4,6 - Lyrics: Nabil Khalaf, Music: Walid Saad, Production: Osama El Hendy

Tracks 3,7 - Lyrics: Adel Rafoul, Music and Production: Wassim Bustani

== Personnel ==
Adapted from the album liner notes.

- Maurice Tawile – vocal recording (tracks 1,2,4,5,6,8)
- Dr. Amira El Nasser – children's choral conducting (tracks 1,2,4,5,6,8)
- Hisham El Gharb – studio choir (tracks 1,2,4,5,6,8)
- Ahmed Ayadi – studio choir (tracks 1,2,4,5,6,8)
- Farouk Mohammed Hasan – studio choir (tracks 1,2,4,5,6,8)
- Mostafa Aslan – studio choir (tracks 1,2,4,5,6,8)
- Mahmoud Souror – studio choir (tracks 1,2,4,5,6,8)
- Tamer El Zoaiby – mixing (tracks 1,2,5,8)
- Osama El Hendy – producer; mixing (tracks 4,6)
- Tony Haddad – mastering
- David Abdallah – photography
- Joe Saliba – photography
- Karine Wehbe – graphic design

== Release history ==
Region	Date	Format(s)	Edition(s)	Label(s)	Ref.
Worldwide	September 13, 2012	Digital Download	Standard	In2Musica; Arabica Music	
Middle East	September 13, 2012	CD; Digital Download	Standard	In2Musica; Arabica Music; Music Misr; Lord Sound	
