= Sheel Oyoonak Anni =

Sheel Oyoonak Anni شيل عيونك عني

Studio album by Nancy Ajram
- Released: July 1, 2001
- Recorded: 2000–2001
- Studio: Boudy Naoum (Beirut)
- Genre: Arabic Pop; World
- Length: 33:16
- Label: EMI
- Producer: Elie Al Aliya

Nancy Ajram chronology
| Mihtagalak (1998) | Sheel Oyoonak Anni شيل عيونك عني (2001) | Ya Salam (2003) |

Singles from Sheel Oyoonak Anni
- 1. "Sheel Oyoonak Anni" Released: July 1, 2001

Sheel Oyoonak Anni (Arabic: شيل عيونك عني, English: Stop Staring at Me) is the second studio Album by Lebanese singer Nancy Ajram. It was released on July 1, 2001, through EMI Music Arabia.

== Background and composition ==
In 2000, Lebanese renowned lyricist and musician Issam Zgheib met Ajram and decided to adopt her talent, they agreed to the deal with the stipulation that she sings in Lebanese dialect only. The Album was written entirely by Zgheib, composed by Lebanese singer, composer and lyricist Wissam Al Amir, composer Suhail Fares and produced by maestro Elie Al Aliya. Production for the album took place during 2000 to 2001 at Boudy Naoum recording studio in Beirut. Musically, the album is Lebanese oriental music styled, and lyrically it speaks of love and romantic relationships.

== Release and promotion ==
Sheel Oyoonak Anni was officially released on July 1, 2001 in the Arab world. In a launch party organized by EMI, Ajram celebrated the release of the album on September 12, she performed the entire album in addition to a song by Fairuz and another by Sabah. During the party, EMI announced that they settled on "Sheel Oyoonak Anni" to be filmed by Lebanese director Guy Zahlan.

== Track listing ==
Standard edition

| No. | Title | Lyrics | Music | Arranger | Length |
|---|---|---|---|---|---|
| 1. | "Ananiyah" (Selfish) | Issam Zgheib | Wissam Al Amir | Elie Al Aliya | 4:32 |
| 2. | "Moktanaa Heyk" (I'm Satisfied) | Zgheib | Al Amir | Al Aliya | 4:20 |
| 3. | "Sheel Oyoonak Anni" (Stop Staring at Me) | Zgheib | Suhail Fares | Al Aliya | 5:21 |
| 4. | "Kan Omri Ashra" (I Was Only Ten Years Old) | Zgheib | Al Amir | Al Aliya | 4:13 |
| 5. | "Am Byesal Albi" (I Wonder) | Zgheib | Fares | Al Aliya | 4:25 |
| 6. | "Al Yady" (A Popular Song) | Zgheib | Lebanese Folklore | Al Aliya | 4:34 |
| 7. | "Rah Ellak Keef" (Let Me Tell You How) | Zgheib | Fares | Al Aliya | 5:26 |
| Total length: | | | | | 33:16 |

- Note: Credits were adapted from the album liner notes.
