= Cevizli =

Cevizli may refer to:

- Cevizli, Akseki, village in Antalya Province, Turkey
- Cevizli, Bayat
- Cevizli, Çameli
- Cevizli, Erzincan
- Cevizli, Gelibolu
- Cevizli, İscehisar, village in Afyonkarahisar Province, Turkey
- Cevizli, Oğuzlar
- Cevizli, Şavşat, village in Artvin Province, Turkey
- Cevizli, İskele, quarter of Trikomo, Cyprus
- Cevizli, Ortaköy
- Kivisili, village in Larnaca District, Cyprus
