= Mihtagalak =

Mihtagalak محتجالك

Studio album by Nancy Ajram
- Released: October 2, 1998
- Recorded: 1998
- Studio: Boudy Naoum (Beirut); Joe Baroudjian (Beirut)
- Genre: Arabic Pop; World
- Length: 38:15
- Label: EMI
- Producer: Nasser Al Assad; Elie Al Aliya; Jack Haddad; Bilal Al Zein; Antoine Al Shaack; Jihad Akel

Nancy Ajram chronology
Mihtagalak محتجالك (1998)	Sheel Oyoonak Anni (2001)

Singles from Mihtagalak
- 1. "Mihtagalak" Released: October 2, 1998

Mihtagalak (Arabic: محتجالك, English: I Need You) is the debut studio album by Lebanese singer Nancy Ajram. It was released on October 2, 1998, by EMI Music Arabia.

== Background and composition ==
After winning the gold medal in a Lebanese reality television competition Noujoum Al-Moustakbal and prior to signing with EMI, Ajram was discovered by renowned Lebanese musician Fouad Awwad, whom she studied music with.

At the age of 13, Ajram released her first singles edtitled "Hobbak Allam Albi El Gheere" and "Oulha Kelma Ala Shani", which were ultimately excluded from the album. A few months later, Ajram signed with EMI Music Arabia to record a full-length album.

In Mihtagalak, Ajram collaborated with several known songwriters and musicians, including Shaker Al Mouji, George Karam, Dsouki Abdel Hafez, Issam Zgheib, Antoine Al Shaack, Kamal Al Taweel and Elie Al Aliya.

The only music video in the album for the lead single "Mihtagalak", was directed by Elie Feghali in Lebanon.

== Release and impact ==
Mihtagalak was officially released in late 1998. According to Ajram, the contract with EMI didn't help her back then as the album received no attention on media, although the lead single "Mitagalak" peaked within the top ten of single charts in Lebanon.

== Track listing ==
Standard edition

No.	Title	Lyrics	Music	Producer	Length
1.	"Mihtagalak" (I Need You)	Dsouki Abdel Hafez	Shaker Al-Mouji	Nasser Al-Assad	5:53
2.	"Moudhesh" (Wonderful)	Tony Abi Karam	George Karam	Elie Al Aliya	4:35
3.	"Ana Aam Faker Feek" (I Am Thinking About You)	Tanios Harfouch	Shaker Al-Mouji	Jack Haddad	5:23
4.	"Akid Ya Hayati Aktar" (I Am Sure My Darling)	Tanios Harfouch	Shaker Al-Mouji	Bilal Al-Zein	6:27
5.	"Awal Sahra" (First Evening)	Issam Zgheib	Antoine Al-Shaack	Antoine Al-Shaack	4:58
6.	"Al Hob Teir" (Love is a Bird)	Tanios Harfouch	Shaker Al-Mouji	Jack Haddad	6:00
7.	"Ya Wad Ya Tkeel" (You Are So Vain)	Salah Jaheen	Kamal Al Taweel	Jihad Akel	4:59
Total length:					38:15

- Note: Credits were adapted from the album liner notes.
