= Shakhbat Shakhabit =

Shakhbat Shakhabit شخبط شخابيط

Studio album by Nancy Ajram
- Released: June 11, 2007
- Recorded: 2007
- Studio: ART (Cairo); Sout El Hob (Cairo); Wassim Bustani (Beirut) Digimix Recording Studio (Australia)
- Genre: Arabic Pop; World
- Length: 30:25
- Label: EWE Productions
- Producer: Jiji Lamara (exec.); Nancy Ajram (exec.); Ashraf Abdou; Walid Maymani; Wassim Bustani; Oussama Al Hindi

Nancy Ajram chronology
Ya Tabtab...Wa Dallaa (2006)	Shakhbat Shakhabit شخبط شخابيط (2007)	Betfakkar Fi Eih (2008)

Singles from Shakhbat Shakhabit
- 1. "Shakhbat Shakhabit" Released: June 1, 2007; 2. "Shater" Released: June 1, 2007; 3. "Katkouta" Released: June 1, 2007; 4. "Risala Lil Aalam" Released: May 26, 2008

Shakhbat Shakhabit (Arabic: شخبط شخابيط, English: Scribbled Doodles) is the first children's album by Lebanese singer Nancy Ajram. It was released on June 11, 2007 by EWE Productions. Ajram has always wanted to dedicate a work for children, and indeed, the album and video came as an important step in her career. The music was created by Egyptian composer Waleed Saad. The song was arranged and recorded by Ashraf Abdo and George Ramsey at Digimix Recording Studios. and the video was directed by Said El Marouk after "Ehsas Jdeed"'s success with Ajram, was the biggest budget out of all of her clips. It included four songs, "Shakhbat Shakhabit", "Katkouta", "Shater", and "Eid Milad" in the credits. The production of the album created a buzz in the Arab music industry, as several producing companies fell into exclusive-rights arguments with each other for its production.

== Development and release ==
Commenting on the idea of making a full-length album for kids, Ajram said,

The idea came up about two years ago, most of the people I know, relatives, friends and even my fans suggested me to dedicate songs for kids especially that I have a baby face, as they say. Before, I used to think as long as kids love my songs such as "Akhsmak Ah" and "Ya Tabtab" why should I make ones specaially for them? But then when I met a group of children in an event they asked me to do so, I loved the idea and started preparing for it while I was working on Ya Tabtab...Wa Dallaa album.

Basically, the album was ready since 1998 and was offered to seven different singers, some completely rejected it, while some cancelled just a few days before they started recording. According to Egyptian songwriter Awad Badawi, who wrote six tracks in the album, Hisham Abbas asked him to write an album for children and asked Walid Saad compose the music. After they finished working on the album, they gave the songs to Abbas who ultimately retreated and gave no reason whatsoever. The album was then offered to Medhat Saleh, Iman Bahr Darwish, Sono Cairo, Ehab Tawfik, Amal Maher, Aline Khalaf and Mohammad Fouad but none of them got down to recording it. But just before Awad gave up on the album, Ajram called Saad and told him that she intends to make an album for children, he answered that he has four songs prepared already, after hearing them she insisted that this album was hers and she immediately recorded it and added two more Egyptian songs, "Kart Shahn" and "Risala Lil Aalam". Ajram then wanted a Lebanese song so she contacted Wassim Bustani who composed "Shater". George Ramsey and Ashraf Abdo worked on the arrangement and the recording of the song in Australia at Digimix recording studios. Kuwaiti composer Yaacoub Al Khubayzi who previously composed Ajram's successful Khaliji hit, "Mishtaga Leik", in her previous album "Ya Tabtab...Wa Dallaa", also composed the only Khaliji song in the album, "Kellena".

The seven-minute music video, which features four different tracks from the album, was filmed in Beirut on 9 and 10 March 2007, with Lebanese director Said El Marouk, as a second collaboration with Ajram, after "Ehsas Jdeed". Ajram played three different rolls in the video, the first one is butterfly, mother and kindergarten teacher who tells the story portraying a fairytale.

Shakhbat Shakhabit was officially released on June 10, 2007, while the music was video premiered on TV channels one week before.

== Success ==
The album and video were the most notable and successful work for children at the time, following a huge wave of works directed to children. The reason for this could be the fact that it was purely meant for children, unlike children works by other singers that included romantic content for adults. The video was also the only music video broadcast on MBC's children's channel, MBC 3. On the third anniversary of the channel, Nancy hosted the live children's event as she performed "Shakhbat", "Shater", and "Eid Milad". It's worth mentioning that Shakhbat Shakhabit beat Nancy's expectations, because it achieved huge success even among adults. "Shakhbat" and "Shater" achieved the most success in the album. However, all of the songs were played in schools and reached children all over the Arab world.

== World peace ==
Shakhabit also includes a song about World Peace, called "Risala Lil Aalam" (A Message to the World). It was filmed in complete secrecy with Fadi Haddad, in a first cooperation with Ajram, using techniques newly introduced to the Arab world. The video, which portrays peace issues of the Arab world and its children, is expected to be aired on all satellite channels, including news channel Al Arabiya. The video was released on May 25, 2008, the day the Lebanese president General Michel Suleiman was elected ending a deadlock that lasted since November. It was the first video for Ajram that had an entirely graphical world that implied the suffering of children worldwide and the need to bring out a more colorful and happy world for them, like the one in the video. Old rumors claimed that the video will be presented to the UNICEF.

== Track listing ==
Standard edition
No.	Title	Length
1.	"Shakhbat Shakhabit" (Scribbled Doodles)	3:34
2.	"Kart Shahn" (Recharge Card)	4:34
3.	"Katkouta" (Cutie)	3:26
4.	"Risala Lil Aalam" (A Message to the World)	3:50
5.	"Shater" (Good Boy)	3:08
6.	"Eid Milad" (Birthday)	4:10
7.	"Kellena" (All of Us)	3:58
8.	"Asfour El Nounou" (Little Birdie)	3:45
Total length:		30:25

Shakbat Shakhabit – DVD
No.	Title	Length
1.	"Shakbat Shakhabit Medley (ft. Katkouta, Shater, Eid Milad)"	8:26

== Credits ==
Tracks 1,6,8 - Lyrics: Awad Badawi, Music: Walid Saad, Production: Ashraf Abdou

Tracks 2,3,4 - Lyrics: Awad Badawi, Music: Walid Saad, Production: Walid Maymani

Track 5 - Lyrics: Mounir Bou Assaf, Music and Production: Wassim Bustani

Track 7 - Lyrics: Saad Al Musallam, Music: Yaacoub Al Khubayzi, Production: Oussama Al Hindi

== Personnel ==
Adapted from the album liner notes.

- Dr. Jihan El Nasser – children's choral conducting
- Mostafa Aslan – guitar
- Ahmed Ayadi – tabla
- Mahmoud Souror – rebab; violin
- Hisham El Arabi – riq
- Hani Farhat – violin
- Tamer Ghonim – violin; strings (track 8)
- Tamer Talaat – strings (track 4)
- Mahmoud (child) – featured vocals (track 2)
- Habiba Hazem Tayel (child) – featured vocals (track 3)
- Yasser Anwar – sound engineer (tracks 1,2,3,4,6,7,8)
- Joseph Karam – sound engineer (track 5)
- Tony Haddad – digital mastering
- Fares El Jammal – photography
- Georges Yucef – graphic design
