= Ya Salam =

Ya Salam يا سلام

Studio album by Nancy Ajram
- Released: February 24, 2003
- Recorded: 2002–2003
- Studio: Saba (Beirut); Boudy Naoum (Beirut); Leila (Cairo)
- Genre: Arabic Pop; World
- Length: 39:37
- Label: Relax-In; Megastar
- Producer: Jiji Lamara (exec.); Adel Ayesh; Tony Saba; Tarek Madkour; Mohammed Mustafa; Roger Khoury

Nancy Ajram chronology
Sheel Oyoonak Anni (2001)	Ya Salam يا سلام (2003)	Ah W Noss (2004)

Collector's Edition cover
- Cover for 2-disc Collector's Edition

Singles from Ya Salam
- 1. "Akhasmak Ah" Released: December 2002; 2. "Ya Salam" Released: May 2003; 3. "Yay (Sehr Oyouno)" Released: October 2003

Ya Salam (Arabic: يا سلام, English: How Wonderful) is the third studio album by Lebanese singer Nancy Ajram. It was released on February 24, 2003 by Relax-In and Megastar. Ajram worked with all new collaborations, including Tarek Madkour, Adel Ayesh, Samir Sfeir, Salim Salameh and Tony Saba. Described as a turning point in Ajram's career, it represents a departure from the classical sound of her previous releases, Mihtagalak (1998) and Sheel Oyounak Anni (2001). Apart from the sound, she also endorsed a new image for the release going from an innocent girl to an edgier and more sexual look.

Upon its release, the record received generally positive to mixed reviews from music critics, some of them praised its composition and Ajram's new musical direction, while others criticized its lack of musical focus. Thanks to Ya Salam, Ajram received several Awards, including Murex d'Or and The Golden Lion Award.

Ya Salam spawned three singles, the lead single, "Akhasmak Ah", was a commercial success. The follow-up, "Ya Salam", was praised by critics and garnered chart success in the Arab World. The last single, "Yay", became a top 10 hit in various Arab countries. Ajram performed several songs from Ya Salam in a number of shows, notably during El Hawa Hawana on Dream TV with Hala Sarhan, the 2003 Sham El Nessim Festival in Egypt and Jerash Festival in Jordan. In support of the album, Ajram embarked on her first Middle Eastern concert tour. The album was reissued in 2007, packaged with both audio and visual discs with a different artwork.

== Development and release ==
By chance, Ajram met the renowned Lebanese producer and artist manager Jiji Lamara through a mutual friend, songwriter and composer Suhail Fares. They shared the same interests, as Lamara looked for a new talent after splitting with Aline Khalaf, while Ajram had no artist manager back then. After a short period they signed a six-month contract extension as they get along to continue. In mid 2002, they began work on her third studio album. Looking to transition from the folk and classical styles of her debut album (1998) and second album (2001), Ajram took creative control over her next album project, both musically and lyrically, under supervision of Lamara. She also changed her public image and established her new alter ego. Musically, its music incorporates pop with influences from different genres, including ballad and rock.

In late 2002, Ajram started to record her then-upcoming material. The recording sessions took place in studios around Beirut, Lebanon and Cairo, Egypt, including Saba and Boudy Naoum Studios in Beirut and Leila Studio in Cairo. As executive producer, Ajram's then-new manager Lamara enlisted a wide range of new collaborators for the album, including Lebanese famous songwriter Nizar Francis, Lebanese noted singer-composer Samir Sfeir and well known Egyptian musician and record producer Tarek Madkour, who created the track "Yay". In addition, Egyptian songwriter Mustafa Zaki, who wrote the title track "Ya Salam", Lebanese composer Salim Salameh, who composed three tracks in the album and Egyptian record producer Mohammed Mustafa, who also produced three tracks.

Egyptian songwriter Fawzi Ibrahim and composer Mohammed Saad had created the track "Akhasmak Ah" in 2002 and offered it to Lebanese singer Aline Khalaf, who rejected the song and preferred another one entitled "Haymana", stating she had enough songs for her to record; at the time, Khalaf was working on her seventh studio album Law Andak Kalam. Then they reached out to Jiji Lamara, who bought the record and forwarded it to Ajram.

In December 2002, "Akhasmak Ah" was released as the album's lead single, followed by the album official release on February 24, 2003.

=== Collector's Edition ===
The album was re-released on February 14, 2007 by EMI Music Arabia for the Middle Eastern and European markets. It's re-packaged as Ya Salam: Collector's Edition with the audio and visual discs and a different artwork. The audio disc is a digitally remastered version of the album which also contains mobile wallpapers, the visual disc contains three music videos and other three live performances.

== Singles ==
- "Akhasmak Ah" was serviced as the lead single from the album in December 2002. Upon its release, the song received mixed reviews from critics; some of whom criticized its sound, while the others chose it as a stand-out track from Ya Salam. Its accompanying music video, directed by Nadine Labaki, was criticized due to its sexual content, and sparked protests in the Arab World. However, it was a huge hit, topping Arabic music charts for 10 continuous weeks.
- The album's second single and title track was "Ya Salam". Released following the controversial "Akhasmak Ah" in May 2003, "Ya Salam" garnered positive critical reception. Commercially, the single gained impact on charts in the Middle East, peaking within the top ten in many countries. Its music video, also directed by Labaki, garnered positive reaction from media outlets by portraying a star with a sad life inspired from the 1960s. The video was awarded as the Best Music Video at the 4th annual Murex d'Or ceremony.
- "Yay" was released as the third single from Ya Salam in October 2003. The single was well received by most critics, as well as managed chart success in several Arab countries. Its accompanying music clip, directed by Labaki, showed the "girl-next-door" side of Ajram. The single peaked at number one for 6 continuous weeks then dropped to number two for 5 weeks.

== Track listing ==
Standard edition
No.	Title	Lyrics	Music	Producer	Length
1.	"Akhasmak Ah" (I'll Fight You, Yeah)	Fawzi Ibrahim	Mohammed Saad	Adel Ayesh	5:02
2.	"Nasseto Garho" (Made Him Forget His Pain)	Mounir Bou Assaf	Salim Salameh	Tony Saba	4:42
3.	"Yay^{[a]}" (Wow)	Nizar Francis	Samir Sfeir	Tarek Madkour	4:33
4.	"Inta W Bass" (Only You)	Walid Al Shaeri	Ashraf Salem	Mohammed Mustafa	5:00
5.	"Ya Salam" (How Wonderful)	Mustafa Zaki	Salim Salameh	Tony Saba	4:41
6.	"Ahla Jaw" (Great Atmosphere)	Ahmed Al Assi	Salim Salameh	Mohammed Mustafa	3:57
7.	"Eynann Tara" (When Eyes Can See)	Suhail Fares	Suhail Fares	Mohammed Mustafa	4:10
8.	"Inta" (You)	Adel Rafoul	George Mardirousian	Roger Khoury	4:16
9.	"Ashkaraballi" (Obvious)	Adel Rafoul	Shadi Ibrahim	Tony Saba	3:17
Total length:					39:37

Ya Salam – Collector's Edition featuring DVD (Disc 2)
No.	Title	Length
1.	"Akhasmak Ah" (Music video)	5:09
2.	"Yay" (Music video)	4:50
3.	"Ya Salam" (Music video)	5:35
4.	"Akhasmak Ah" (Live)	10:09
5.	"Yay" (Live)	9:17
6.	"Ya Salam" (Live)	6:50

Notes

- ^{^[a]} 'Yay' is alternatively titled ‘Seher Oyounoh’ (The Charm in His Eyes).

== Personnel ==
Adapted from the album liner notes.

- Elie Saba – sound engineer (tracks 2,5,9)
- Mohammed Sakr – sound engineer (tracks 1,3,4,6,7)
- Khaled Raouf – sound engineer (tracks 1,3,4,6,7)
- Boudy Naoum – sound engineer (track 8)
- Raymond El Hajj – strings writing and conducting (tracks 2,5,9)
- Tony Haddad – digital mastering
- Rodrigue Najarian – photography
- Tony Karam – photography
- Georges Yucef – graphic design

== Awards and nominations ==
Year	Award	Nominated	Category	Result	Ref.
2003	International Video Clip Festival (Egypt)	Nancy Ajram	Best Arab Singer	Won	
2003	International Video Clip Festival (Egypt)	"Akhasmak Ah"	Best Music Video	Won	
2003	Murex d'Or	Nancy Ajram	Best Female Lebanese Singer	Won	
2003	Murex d'Or	"Ya Salam"	Best Music Video	Won	
2003	The Golden Lion Award	Nancy Ajram	Youngest Arab Singer	Won	
2003	LG Music Award	Nancy Ajram	Honor	Won	
2003	Zahrat Al Khaleej Magazine	Nancy Ajram	Best Female Arab Singer	Won	
