= Hadi Sharara =

Lebanese composer (born 1969)

Hadi Riad Sharara (or Hady Sharara, Arabic: هادي شرارة, born 1969) is a Lebanese music arranger, composer and producer. He is the son of the famous Lebanese television anchor Riad Sharara and the husband of the famous Lebanese singer of Carole Sakr.

He has also been the music producer of the Arabic versions of The X Factor and Dancing with the Stars.

He was subject to criticism because of his statements during the "Menna w Jerr" episode by Pierre Rabbat on MTV, considering that the artist Maya Diab possesses the qualifications that his father Riad Sharara had, which prompted him to issue an explanation during which he declared his remorse for appearing in the program.

== Biography ==
Born in 1969 to a prominent family, he is the son of the journalist Riad Sharara, who died in 1994 after a heart attack on stage. His mother is Renee Debs, and he has three siblings: Hanadi, Nadine and Ghadi.

He started his artistic journey with a Lebanese music band singing in English called ZED in 1986, and the band included the Lebanese singer Carole Sakr, who later became his wife; they are parents to Jean-Michel Zacca and Aghia–Maria Sharara.

His style of music production is known for its fusion between eastern and western styles. This distinctiveness resulted in him being associated with the new generation of Top Hits, and well-known Arab singers such as Wael Kfoury, Najwa Karam, Nancy Ajram, Ragheb Alama, Nawal Al Zoghbi, Maya Diab and many others.

In 2006, Hady Sharara won the Murex D'or Excellence Award as "Best Music Arranger".

Hadi Sharara owns a music recording studio named Hadi Sharara Studio.

== See also ==
- Carole Sakr
- Riad Sharara
- Tarek Abou Jaoude
- Maya Diab
