= Ah W Noss =

2004 album by Nancy Ajram

Ah W Noss آه ونص

Studio album by Nancy Ajram
- Released: April 14, 2004
- Recorded: 2003–2004
- Studios: Saba (Beirut); JMR (Beirut); Leila (Cairo); Hot Spot (Cairo); M. Sound (Cairo); Sout El Musiqiyyin (Cairo)
- Genres: Arabic Pop; Egyptian music
- Length: 53:13
- Labels: Relax-In; Megastar
- Producers: Jiji Lamara; Tarek Madkour; Jean-Marie Riachi; Tony Saba; Adel Ayash; Tarek Aakef; Mohammed Mustafa; Midhat Khamis

Nancy Ajram chronology
Ya Salam (2003)	Ah W Noss آه ونص (2004)	Ya Tabtab...Wa Dallaa (2006)

Collector's Edition cover
- Cover for 2-disc Collector's Edition

Singles from Ah W Noss
- 1. "Ah W Noss" Released: April 14, 2004; 2. "Lawn Ouyounak" Released: November 2004; 3. "Oul Tani Eyh" Released: March 5, 2005; 4. "Inta Eyh" Released: May 19, 2005

Ah W Noss (Arabic: آه ونص, literally Yes and a Half, idiomatically I Mean It) is the fourth studio album by Lebanese singer Nancy Ajram. It was released on April 14, 2004, by Relax-In and Megastar Records. This was the follow-up project to 2003's Ya Salam. The album launched Ajram to the heights of music, thanks to its string of successful singles. The album received a massive commercial success in Egypt, especially the single "Ah W Noss", as it was sung in Egyptian Arabic. Serving as executive producer, Ajram's manager, Jiji Lamara enlisted a wide range of producers including Tarek Madkour, Jean-Marie Riachi, Tony Saba, and Adel Ayash. Recording sessions for the album began in mid 2003 and took place at several recording studios throughout Lebanon and Egypt. Musically, the album represents a continuity for her previous effort Ya Salam, which contained pop and pop rock ballads. The album also explores other genres.

Ah W Noss received positive reviews from music critics. The lead single, "Ah W Noss", went on to achieve massive airplay and video time on the major music channels, commanding the top spot for several weeks. The album was a big hit, on the strength of the lead single. Summer 2004 saw Ajram launch a major world tour on the strength of her new single. With the record, Ajram received several awards, including Murex d'Or, Arabian Music Award and Dear Guest Award. In late 2004, Ajram became the Middle Eastern face of Coca-Cola, which opened a whole new promotional phase for the young starlet. Ajram was also chosen by Newsweek as one of the most influential people in the Arab world in May 2005. The album was reissued in 2006, packaged with both audio and visual discs and a different artwork.

== Background and release ==
Ajram's previous album Ya Salam (2003) was a commercial success and received generally positive reviews from most music critics. The album featured three top ten hits, including other international breakthrough Egyptian single "Akhasmak Ah". After filming the final single of Ya Salam, "Yay" in September 2003, Ajram announced that she began working on the follow-up album to be released in early 2004. With the success of her last album, Ajram wanted to make sure that she didn't fall into one sound or vibe. However, her manager Jiji Lamara described the album as a whole as "supernatural record", stating that the album is different from her past works and contains new collaborations including Lebanese composer Tarek Abou Jaoude and Egyptian producer Mohammed Rahim.

Billboards featuring the album cover filled the streets of Lebanese and Egyptian cities in late March. Ah W Noss was officially released on April 14, 2004, in the Middle East.

=== Collector's Edition ===
The album was re-released on July 16, 2006, by EMI Music Arabia for the Middle Eastern and European markets. It's re-packaged as Ah W Noss: Collector's Edition with the audio and visual discs and a different artwork created by photographer Fares El Jammal. The audio disc is a digitally remastered version of the album which also contains mobile wallpapers, the visual disc contains three music videos and other two live performances.

== Recording and composition ==
Ajram began recording songs for the album in mid 2003. The recording sessions for the album took place at Leila, Hot Spot, M. Sound and Sout El Musiqiyyin Studios in Cairo, Saba and JMR Studios in Beirut. Ajram worked with several different songwriters and producers on the album, including previous album collaborations such as Tarek Madkour, Mohammed Saad, Samir Sfeir, Tony Saba and Adel Ayash, along with new collaborations with Tarek Abou Jaoude, Walid Saad, Mohammed Rahim, Samir Nakhle, Ayman Bahgat Amar, Mahmoud Khayami, Ahmed Shatta, Mustafa Moursi, Medhat Khamis, Tarek Aakef, Sheikh Sabah Nasser Al Sabah and others.

Ah W Noss features more ballad and belly dance tone than Ajram's previous albums. Primarily a pop and maqsoum album, it also incorporates musical elements of pop rock. The album's production is typified by an oriental sound intertwining guitar licks, bass beats, minor-key melodies, and polyrhythmic vocal harmonies. The lyrical content of the album features generally mixed views on love and boastful lyrics concerning excitement, teasing and adversity.

During recording the album, a song entitled "Ya Si El Sayed" was stolen from the studio after Ajram finished recording it. No information is given about what happened exactly, whether it was due to the neglect of the recording studio or the record label. Fortunately, Ajram had the copyrights of the song so nobody could use it illegally. However the song was re-produced by Tarek Madkour and was released in the follow-up album Ya Tabtab...Wa Dallaa (2006).

== Singles ==
- "Ah W Noss" was released as the album's lead single on April 14, 2004. The song was sent to Arabic radio stations on the same day. It received positive reviews from music critics, who praised its chorus and thunderous dance beats. The song reached number one on Arabic music charts including Lebanon and Egypt, becoming one of her best charting songs to date. The official music video was filmed by Lebanese director Nadine Labaki in Sidon, Ajram plays a role of an Egyptian villager who escapes her stalker.
- "Lawn Ouyounak" was released as the album's second single. Music critics praised the song as some of Ajram's best Lebanese vocal work to date, noting the romantic nature of the song. The song peaked at number one on numerous music charts in the Arab world, giving Ajram her fifth number-one on charts. Its Music video, which was also directed by Labaki, is a sequel to the video of "Yay", Ajram plays a bride role in a traditional Lebanese wedding. Traditional wedding beats and chants added at the beginning of the song.
- "Oul Tani Eyh" served as the album's third single and Coca-Cola campaign first single, having its TV premiere on March 5, 2005. The single was a big success, topping several music charts in the Middle East. The music video was filmed with the international Italian director Luca Tomassini, it was made of footage of backstage scenes from Ajram's first Coke commercial.
- "Inta Eyh" was released as the fourth and final single from the album on May 19, 2005. The song reached the top five of many countries in the MENA region. The song's accompanying music video was directed by Labaki as the sixth collaboration with the singer, in which Ajram portrays a sad wife who discovers that her husband is cheating on her with her best friend. Ajram wakes up at dawn and cries in the bathroom recalling events.

== Track listing ==
Standard edition
No.	Title	Lyrics	Music	Producer	Length
1.	"Ah W Noss" (Yes and a Half)	Ayman Bahgat Amar	Tarek Madkour	Tarek Madkour	4:40
2.	"Baddalaa Aleyk" (Playing Hard to Get)	Ahmed Shatta	Mahmoud Khayami	Jean-Marie Riachi	4:36
3.	"Lawn Ouyounak" (The Color of Your Eyes)	Samir Nakhle	Tarek Abou Jaoude	Tony Saba	3:58
4.	"Oul Tani Eyh" (Say It Again?)	Sultan Salah	Mohammed Saad	Tarek Madkour	4:07
5.	"Taala Ya" (Come Here)	Ahmed Shatta	Khaled Jnaid	Adel Ayash	4:48
6.	"Sana Wara Sana" (Year After Year)	Mahmoud Saad	Fadi Saad	Tony Saba	4:38
7.	"Inta Eyh" (What's the Matter with You?)	Mustafa Moursi	Samir Sfeir	Tarek Madkour	5:05
8.	"Gayinn You'Ouluoli" (They Came To Tell Me)	Mustafa Moursi	Samir Sfeir	Tarek Aakef	5:24
9.	"Ana Leyh" (Why?)	Ikram El Assi	Mohammed Rahim	Mohammed Mustafa	5:29
10.	"Hobbak Liya" (Your Love)	Mustafa Moursi	Walid Saad	Medhat Khamis	5:17
11.	"La Teloum" (Don't Blame)	Sheikh Sabah Nasser Al Sabah	Samir Sfeir	Tarek Aakef	5:09
Total length:					53:13

Ah W Noss – Collector's Edition featuring DVD (Disc 2)
No.	Title	Length
1.	"Ah W Noss"	4:40
2.	"Lawn Ouyounak"	3:58
3.	"Inta Eyh"	5:05
4.	"Badallaa Aleyk" (Live)	10:39
5.	"Oul Tani Eyh" (Live)	6:46

== Personnel ==
Adapted from the album liner notes.

- Mohammed Sakr – sound engineer
- Nash'at Nasr Eldeen – sound engineer
- Amir Mahrous – sound engineer
- Elie Saba – sound engineer
- Jean-Marie Riachi – producer; sound engineer
- Tony Haddad – digital mastering
- David Abdallah – photography
- Fares El Jammal – photography
- Georges Yucef – graphic design

== Awards and nominations ==
Year	Award	Nominated	Category	Result	Ref.
2004	Murex d'Or	Nancy Ajram	Best Female Lebanese Singer	Won	
2004	Arabian Music Awards	Nancy Ajram	Best Female Arab Singer	Won	
2004	Zahrat Al Khaleej Magazine	Nancy Ajram	Best Female Arab Singer	Won	
2004	Zahrat Al Khaleej Magazine	"Lawn Ouyounak"	Best Music Video	Won	
2005	Newsweek	Nancy Ajram	Most Influential Arab Personalities	Won	
2005	Dear Guest Awards	Nancy Ajram	Best Female Arab Artist	Won	
2005	Opera House of Egypt	Nancy Ajram	Honor	Won	
