= Anghami =

Music streaming service in the Arab world

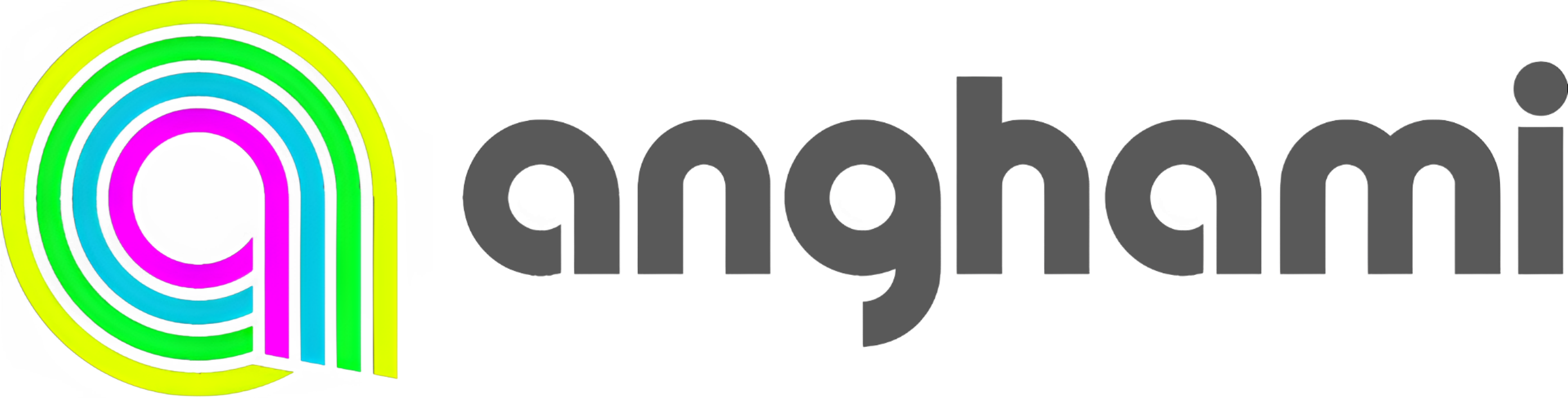
- Available in: Arabic, English, French
- Founded: 2012; 14 years ago
- Headquarters: Abu Dhabi, UAE
- Area served: Arab world, 13 countries (full catalogue)
- Owner: OSN+ (2024–present)
- Founders: Eddy Maroun; Elie Habib
- CEO: Eddy Maroun
- Industry: Music
- Services: Music streaming
- Employees: 120 (2021)
- Website: www.anghami.com
- Registration: Optional
- Users: 73 million+ (2023)
- Launched: 5 November 2012
- Current status: Active
- Native clients on: Windows, Symbian, Windows Phone, Linux, BlackBerry OS, Android, iOS, ChromeOS, macOS, MeeGo, PlayStation 4, PlayStation 5 and Apple TV, WatchOS, Wear OS, Fitbit OS, Android TV, CarPlay, Chromecast, Android Auto
- Written in: Angular; JavaScript

Anghami (Arabic: أنغامي ʾanġāmī [ʔanˈɣaːmi], "melodic"/"my melodies") is the first legal music streaming platform and digital distribution company in the Arab world. It launched in November 2012 in Lebanon, providing unlimited Arabic and international music to stream and download for offline mode.

It is designed for the Middle East and North Africa to provide the largest music catalog of licensed content from the major Arabic/regional labels such as Rotana Music Group, Melody, Mazzika, Platinum Records and many other independent labels, in addition to international majors labels such as Sony, Universal and Warner Music. It is one of the largest digital music ventures in the Middle East, seed funded by MEVP.

On April 2, 2024, streaming platform OSN+ completed the acquisition of a 55.45% stake in Anghami. In the previous month, MBC Group had already acquired a 13.7% stake in the Lebanese company.

== History ==
The goal of Anghami was to reduce music piracy in the Arab world. The service was meant to serve as an alternative to piracy.

Anghami was founded by Eddy Maroun, and Elie Habib in Lebanon, launched initially as a mobile only app with the slogan "The idea is that everywhere you go, you’ll find your music". One of Anghami's app features is Dolby Pulse encoding, which reduces the file size of streamed music for faster and reliable online streaming when the internet bandwidth is fluctuating. Anghami has more than 35 telecom partners.

Shortly after the partnership between Anghami and mobile operators in MENA has been agreed few months after launching, the service experienced rapid growth with 1 million registered users four months after the launch. However, the next million was reached in three months, mainly after partnering with the major media player MBC Group Middle East Broadcasting Center that featured Anghami in one of its most successful TV shows Arab Idol. In 2013, Anghami partnered with Facebook.

Anghami Full-catalog availability

By 2017, Anghami reached 30 million listeners, with 75% of users being in the Arab region. In 2019, Anghami's founder revealed in an interview that Anghami has 21 million monthly active users and 1 million paying subscribers.

In March 2021, Anghami became the first Arabic technology company to list on New York's Nasdaq through a Special Purpose Acquisition Company (SPAC) merger with Vistas Media Acquisition Company and the company was valued at between $220 million and $230 million.

In August 2021, Anghami announced plans to launch a new hybrid entertainment venue named the Anghami Lab in multiple cities worldwide, including Dubai, Riyadh, Jeddah, Cairo, Beirut, London, New York and Los Angeles.

== See also ==
- List of on-demand streaming music services
