= Nancy Ajram discography =

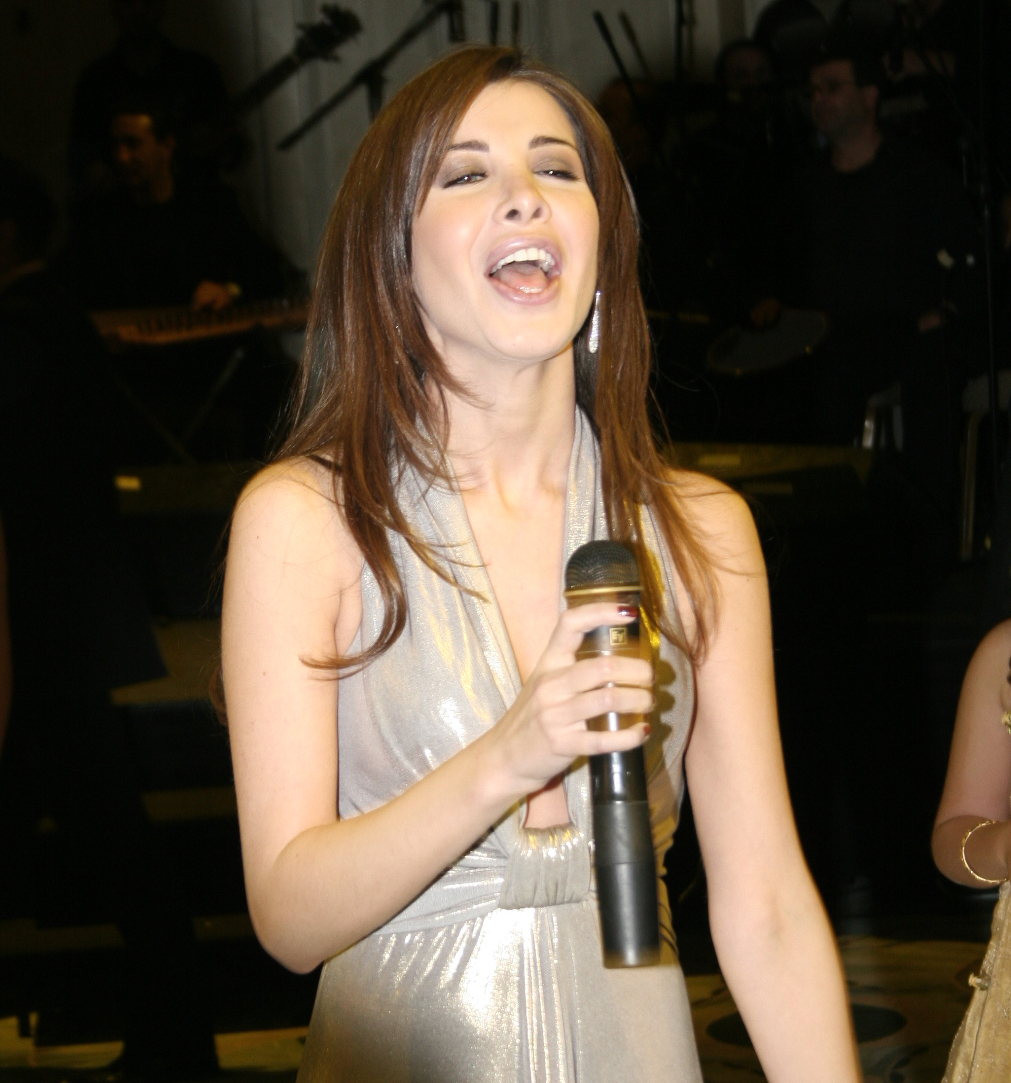
- Ajram in December 2008
- Studio albums: 12
- Live albums: 4
- Compilation albums: 1
- Reissues: 2
- Singles: 61
- Occasionals: 25
- Soundtracks: 11
- Commercials: 11

Lebanese singer Nancy Ajram has released twelve studio albums (including two dedicated for children), four live albums, one compilation album, two reissues and 61 singles. As of 2007, she has sold 30 million records worldwide, making her one of the best-selling Middle Eastern music artists. Numerous of Ajram's singles have reached number one on several Arabic music charts, including Hit Marker and The Official Lebanese Top 20. By 2010, Ajram was announced the best-selling Middle Eastern female singer of the decade (2000–2009).

At age 15, Ajram made her musical debut in 1998 when she signed a multi-album contract with EMI and released her debut album Mihtagalak the same year. According to her, the contract with EMI did not help her back then as the album received no attention on media, although the lead single "Mitagalak" peaked within the top ten of single charts in Lebanon. Like her debut record, Ajram's second studio album Sheel Oyoonak Anni (2001) produced only one single.

Ajram rose to fame with the start of her collaboration with well-known Lebanese producer Jiji Lamara and third studio album Ya Salam. The album's lead single "Akhasmak Ah", became a massive commercial success, topping Arabic music charts for 10 continuous weeks. Two further singles were released from the album, "Ya Salam" and "Yay" which managed chart success in several Arab countries.

The singer's fourth album, Ah W Noss was released in April 2004 and debuted atop the Arabic sales charts. The album's eponymous lead single "Ah W Noss" reached number one on all Arabic music charts including Lebanon and Egypt, becoming one of Ajram's internationally most successful hits of all time. It was followed by further three singles, including "Oul Tani Keda", which served as her Coca-Cola campaign first hit. Ajram's fifth studio album, Ya Tabtab...Wa Dallaa (2006), spawned six singles including the commercial success "Ehsas Jdeed", which topped the Arabic charts for a couple of weeks. In June 2007, Ajram released her first children's album entitled Shakhbat Shakhabit with a seven-minute medley music video. It was the most notable and successful work for children at the time.

Ajram's sixth studio album Betfakkar Fi Eih was released on July 30, 2008, after an accompanying music video that premiered on Melody Hits. Betfakkar Fi Eih broke the record in Hit Marker's Top 10 best-selling Arabic album charts by remaining for 54 consecutive weeks in the list. The Album produced seven singles, including two promotional, which continued Ajram's reign as the artist with most number-one hits in the history of the modern Arab music industry. With Betfakkar Fi Eih, Ajram won her first World Music Award as the World's best selling Middle Eastern artist, becoming the youngest Arabian act to date to score a WMA.

In September 2010, Ajram released her seventh studio album Nancy 7, featuring four successful singles. The lead single, "Fi Hagat" peaked at number one on multiple Arabian charts, most significantly Hit Marker, where it remained atop for 15 consecutive weeks, becoming the longest-running topper in the chart history. Nancy 7 became Ajram's second album to earn the World Music Award as the World's best selling Middle Eastern act. The second children's album by Ajram, Super Nancy, was released in September 2012. It debuted atop the Best-Selling Albums Chart of Hit Marker and stayed atop for continuous weeks. Two years later, Ajram released her eighth album, Nancy 8 (2014). It entered Hit Marker chart directly to number one and remained atop for continuous weeks. The album also was 2014's highest debut for a female album in the Middle East, winning her third World Music Award. The album's lead single, "Ma Tegi Hena" became the fastest selling Arabic song on iTunes history, beating Ahmed Chawki's "Habibi I Love You" and topped Arabic Year End Chart of The Official Lebanese Top 20 as the most streamed song in Lebanon for 2014. Ajram's ninth album Nancy 9 followed in April 2017. It topped Hit Marker chart for 16 continuous weeks since its release. Her tenth album Nancy 10 was released in July 2021.

On 25 July 2022, Ajram's single "Sah Sah" became the first Arabic language song to enter Billboard's Dance/Electronic chart.

== Albums ==
=== Studio albums ===
List of studio albums, with certifications and sales
Title	Album details	Certifications	Sales
Mihtagalak	Released: October 2, 1998; Label: EMI; Formats: Cassette; CD; Digital Download; Streaming		
Sheel Oyoonak Anni	Released: July 1, 2001; Label: EMI; Formats: Cassette; CD; Digital Download; Streaming		
Ya Salam	Released: February 24, 2003; Label: Relax-In; Megastar; EMI; Formats: Cassette; CD; CD/DVD; Digital Download; Streaming		
Ah W Noss	Released: April 14, 2004; Label: Relax-In; Megastar; EMI; Formats: Cassette; CD; CD/DVD; Digital Download; Streaming		
Ya Tabtab...Wa Dallaa	Released: February 21, 2006; Label: Art Line Music; Formats: Cassette; CD; Digital Download; Streaming		
Shakhbat Shakhabit	Released: June 11, 2007; Label: EWE; Formats: Cassette; CD; DVD; Digital Download; Streaming		Arab World: 650,000 (as of 2007)
Betfakkar Fi Eih	Released: July 30, 2008; Label: In2Musica; Melody Music; Formats: Cassette; CD; Digital Download; Streaming		
Nancy 7	Released: September 6, 2010; Label: In2Musica; Formats: Cassette; CD; Digital Download; Streaming		
Super Nancy	Released: September 13, 2012; Label: In2Musica; Formats: Cassette; CD; Digital Download; Streaming	—N/a	—N/a
Nancy 8	Released: March 21, 2014; Label: In2Musica; Formats: Cassette; CD; Digital Download; Streaming	—N/a	—N/a
Nancy 9	Released: April 21, 2017; Label: In2Musica; Formats: CD; Digital Download; Streaming	—N/a	—N/a
Nancy 10	Released: July 10, 2021; Label: In2Musica; Formats: Digital Download; Streaming	—N/a	—N/a
Nancy 11	Released: July 17, 2025; Label: In2Musica; Formats: Digital Download; Streaming	—N/a	—N/a

=== Live albums ===
Title	Album details	Description	Ref.
El Dounya Helwa – Live	Released: October 23, 2007; Label: Art Line Music; Formats: CD	Features her concert at Jerash Festival in Jordan, where Ajram performed on August 13, 2007. The album contains the studio version of the single "El Dounya Helwa" and seven performances from the concert, including a live cover of Aziza Jalal's hit "Mistanyak".	
Awel Mara	Released: May 2, 2009; Label: Art Line Music; Formats: CD	Features live covers of popular songs by old Arab musicians such as Umm Kulthum, Abdel Halim Hafez, Warda Al-Jazairia, Mayada El Hennawy and Sherifa Fadel. The album was recorded during Ajram's concerts between 2006 and 2009.	
Hope Beyond Borders (Live Concert)	Released: May 26, 2020; Label: In2Musica; Formats: Digital Download; Streaming	Features songs from her live miniconcert, which was broadcast on YouTube on May 26, 2020. Ajram performed eight of her songs, which were released under three tracks in the album.	
The 2020 Live Show	Released: September 18, 2020; Label: In2Musica; Formats: Digital Download; Streaming	Features songs from her live miniconcert, which was broadcast on TikTok on September 18, 2020. Ajram performed eleven of her songs, which were released under six tracks in the album.	

=== Compilation albums ===
Title	Album details	Description	Ref.
Greatest Hits	Released: June 8, 2009; Label: EMI; Formats: CD; DVD; CD/DVD; Digital Download; Streaming	Digitally remastered album containing Ajram's most popular hits from her first five studio albums released between 1998 and 2006 and recorded under Relax-In, Megastar and Art Line Music contract with EMI. Three different versions of the album were released, CD, DVD and collector's edition which contains two discs—audio album on one disc, music videos and live performances on the other.	
Best of Nancy Ajram	Released: March 14, 2023; Label: UMG Recordings; Formats: Digital Download; Streaming	Digitally remastered album containing Ajram's most popular hits from all her studio albums and singles.	

=== Reissues ===
Title	Album details	Description	Ref.
Ah W Noss: Collector's Edition	Released: July 16, 2006; Label: EMI; Formats: CD/DVD	Contains two discs—digitally remastered album on one disc, music videos and live performances on the other.	
Ya Salam: Collector's Edition	Released: February 14, 2007; Label: EMI; Formats: CD/DVD	Contains two discs—digitally remastered album on one disc, music videos and live performances on the other.	

== Singles ==
=== Album singles ===
Title	Year	Album
"Mihtagalak"	1998	Mihtagalak
"Sheel Oyoonak Anni"	2001	Sheel Oyoonak Anni
"Akhasmak Ah"	2002	Ya Salam
"Ya Salam"	2003	Ya Salam
"Yay"	2003	Ya Salam
"Ah W Noss"	2004	Ah W Noss
"Lawn Ouyounak"	2004	Ah W Noss
"Oul Tani Keda"	2005	Ah W Noss
"Inta Eyh"	2005	Ah W Noss
"Ya Tabtab"	2006	Ya Tabtab...Wa Dallaa
"Moegaba"	2006	Ya Tabtab...Wa Dallaa
"Ana Yalli Bhebbak"	2006	Ya Tabtab...Wa Dallaa
"Ehsas Jdeed"	2006	Ya Tabtab...Wa Dallaa
"Shakhbat Shakhabit"	2007	Shakhbat Shakhabit (Children's album)
"Shater"	2007	Shakhbat Shakhabit (Children's album)
"Katkouta"	2007	Shakhbat Shakhabit (Children's album)
"Eid Milad"	2007	Shakhbat Shakhabit (Children's album)
"Elli Kan"	2007	Ya Tabtab...Wa Dallaa
"Mishtaga Leik"	2007	Ya Tabtab...Wa Dallaa
"Risala Lil Aalam"	2008	Shakhbat Shakhabit (Children's album)
"Betfakkar Fi Eih"	2008	Betfakkar Fi Eih
"Min Dally Nseek"	2008	Betfakkar Fi Eih
"Lamset Eed"	2009	Betfakkar Fi Eih
"Ibn El Giran"	2009	Betfakkar Fi Eih
"Mashi Haddi"	2009	Betfakkar Fi Eih
"Fi Hagat"	2010	Nancy 7
"Sheikh El Shabab"	2010	Nancy 7
"Ya Kether"	2011	Nancy 7
"Meen El Ma Ando"	2011	Nancy 7
"Ya Banat"	2012	Super Nancy (Children's album)
"Baousi"	2012	Super Nancy (Children's album)
"Stoohi"	2012	Super Nancy (Children's album)
"Ma Tegi Hena"	2014	Nancy 8
"Mouch Far'a Kteer"	2014	Nancy 8
"Ma Awedak"	2014	Nancy 8
"Yalla"	2014	Nancy 8
"W Bkoun Jayi Wadeak"	2015	Nancy 8
"Aam Betaala' Feek"	2016	Nancy 9
"Hassa Beek"	2017	Nancy 9
"W Maak"	2018	Nancy 9
"El Hob Zay El Watar"	2019	Nancy 9
"Salamat"	2021	Nancy 10
"Miyye W Khamsin"	2021	Nancy 10
"Ma Te'tezer"	2022	Nancy 10
"Aala Shanak"	2022	Nancy 10
"Baddi Hada Hebbou"	2023	Nancy 10
"Meshkeltak Alwahidi"	2024	Nancy 10
"Ya Albo"	2025	Nancy 11
"Sidi Ya Sidi"	2025	Nancy 11

=== Non-album singles ===
Title	Year	Writer	Music	Producer	Ref.
"Kel Ma B'ello B Albi El Gheere"	1996	Fares Chalhoub	Abdo Mounzer		
"Oulha Kelma"	1997	Tanios Harfouch	Samir Copty	Unknown	
"El Dounya Helwa"	2007	Ikram El Assi	Mohammed Rahim	Ashraf Abdou	
"Sallemouly Aleih"	2009	Nabil Khalaf	Walid Saad	Tamim	
"Badak Teb'a Fik"	2012	Ahmad Madi	Ziad Bourji	Hadi Sharara	
"Ya Ghali"	2013	Ahmad Madi	Ziad Bourji	Hadi Sharara	
"Aamel Aekla"	2013	Amir Teima	Ramy Gamal	Tarek Madkour	
"Maakoul El Gharam"	2015	Michel Jeha	Joseph Jeha	Bassem Rizk	
"Badna Nwalee El Jaw"	2018	Samir Nakhleh	Joseph Jeha	Bassem Rizk	
"Albi Ya Albi"	2020	Nabil El Khoury		Bassem Rizk	
"Sah Sah"	2022	Ahmad Alaeddine	Moody Saeed	Marshmello; Massari; Tarek Madkour	
"Ya Eid"	2022	Salim Assaf		Bassem Rizk	
"Tegy Nenbeset"	2023	Tamer Hussein	Aziz El Shafei	Tarek Madkour	
"Men Nazra"	2024	Ziad Jamal		Bassem Rizk	
"Toul Omri Negma"	2025	Hani Abdelkarim	Mohamed Rahim	Alexandre Missakian	
"Warana Eh"	2025	Mohamed Yahia		Bassem Rizk	
"Shhadi Ya Deni"	2026	Karim Abdo		Bassem Rizk	
"Bastafizzak"	2026	Menna Elkiey	Aziz El Shafei	Jalal El Hamdaoui	

== Occasionals ==
Title	Year	Wrtiter(s)	Music	Producer	Description	Ref.
"Elha'ni"	2003	Elias Nasser	Guy Manoukian		Official song for Beirut Marathon. Ajram participated along with Yuri Mraqqadi, Dina Hayek, Zein El Omr, Haifa Wehbe and Joe Ashkar.	
"Kuwait Al Shahama"	2005	Elias Nasser	George Karam	Nasser El Assaad	Dedicated to Kuwait.	
"La Ma Khelset El Hekayi"	2005	Nizar Francis	Jean-Marie Riachi		Made for the assassination of late president Rafic Hariri. Ajram participated along with Sabah, Nawal Al Zoghbi, Haifa Wehbe, Wael Kfoury, Amal Hijazi, Maya Nasri, Melhem Zein, Ramy Ayach and others.	
"Ana Masry"	2006	Mustafa Moursi	Walid Saad	Mohammed Mustafa	Timed to coincide with Egypt's hosting and winning of the African Cup of Nations football tournament, taking it by storm.	
"Habib El Omr"	2006	Pierre Hayek	Ziad Boutros	Michel Fadel	Dedicated to Lebanon. It was released following the 2006 Lebanon War.	
"Ahli W Zamalek"	2006	Unknown			Dedicated to the rival Egyptian soccer teams, Al Ahly and Zamalek, being the first to do so after Sabah.	
"Khalleek Bwejj El Ghadab"	2007	Nizar Francis	Samir Sfeir	Karim Abdel Wahab	After the 2007 Lebanon conflict, Ajram dedicated a song to the Lebanese Armed Forces.	
"Al Dhameer Al Arabi"	2008	Abdel Karim Maatouk; Sayed Shawki; Ahmed Alarian; Siham Chacha	Tarek Abou Jaoude; Khaled El Bakri; Mostafa Mahfouz; Adel Hakki	Adel Hakki	The sequel to the well-known "El Helm El Arabi" where Ajram participated along with more than a hundred other artists, including Wadih El Safi, Assala Nasri, Latifa and Cheb Khaled.	
"Ya Rabbi Tekbar Mila"	2009	Fares Iskandar	Salim Salameh	Omar Sabbagh	Dedicated to her daughter Mila.	
"Masr El Mahrousa"	2009	Ayman Bahgat Amar	Ammar El Sherei		Dedicated to Egypt where Ajram gave its debut at the closing ceremony of Cairo Arab Media Festival.	
"Wahshani Ya Masr"	2011	Mohammed Ouf	Mustafa Shawky	Rafik Akef	Dedicated to Egypt after the Egyptian revolution of 2011.	
"Hadri Laabek"	2011	Fares Iskandar	Salim Salameh	Omar Sabbagh	Dedicated to her daughter Ella.	
"Operette Jaysh Lubnan"	2012	Nizar Francis	Samir Sfeir	Dany Helou	Made for the Lebanese Armed Forces 67th anniversary where Ajram participated along with Assi El Helani, Wael Kfoury, Nawal Al Zoghbi and Samir Sfeir.	
"Khodo Balko Di Masr"	2013	Gamal Bekheet	Walid Saad	Tarek Abdel Gaber	Recorded specially for Egypt which Ajram debuted at the 40th Anniversary celebration of the October 6th victory.	
"Operette Kollena Eila"	2013	Nader Abdallah	Walid Saad	Tarek Abdel Gaber	Made about the Pan-Arabism which Ajram performed at the 40th Anniversary celebration of the October 6th victory alongside Hussain Al Jassmi, Wael Jassar, Amal Maher, Ehab Tawfik, Rabeh Sager and others.	
"El Masry Man"	2015	Ayman Bahgat Amar	Amr Mostafa	Tooma	Dedicated to the Egyptian people. Shortly after its illegal broadcast on TV, the song was banned pulled from all streaming services as Ajram, Bahgat Amar and Mostafa filed a lawsuit against the production company due to copyright issues.	
"Al Baraka"	2015	Ayman Bahgat Amar	Amr Mostafa	Tooma	Celebrating the launch of the New Suez Canal. The video showcases Egyptians celebrating the Suez Canal by dancing and waving Egyptian flags.	
"Yetrabba Fi Ezkom"	2016	Mosab Al Enezi	Redouane Diri	Rachid Mohamed Ali	Celebrating the birth of Prince Moulay Rachid of Morocco's first child.	
"Wahashtouna"	2016	Mounir Bou Assaf; Abdel Rahman Al Othman	Hicham Boulos; Abdel Rahman Al Othman	Issam Al Shrayti	Made for the opening of Arab Idol's fourth season where Ajram joined her fellow judges Wael Kfoury, Ahlam and Hassan El Shafei.	
"Operette El Arze"	2017	Nizar Francis	Michel Fadel		Honoring the Lebanese cedar at Cedars International Festival opening day where Ajram performed along with Ghassan Saliba, Mouin Shreif, Rami Ayach, Walid Toufic, Melhem Zein, Zein El Omr, Najwa Karam, Abeer Nehme, Tania Kassis, Joseph Attieh and Elia Francis.	
"Lya"	2019	Mounir Bou Assaf	Nabil Ajram	Bassem Rizk	Dedicated to her daughter Lya.	
"Ragel Ebn Ragel"	2019	Malak Adel	Walid Saad	Ahmed Adel	Dedicated to Egypt.	
"Ila Beirut Al Ontha"	2020	Nizar Qabbani	Hicham Boulos	Bassem Rizk	Following the 2020 Beirut explosion, Ajram dedicated a song to the capital city.	
"Emmi"	2021	Emile Fahd	Yehia El Hassan	Bassem Rizk	Released ahead of the Mother's Day in the Arab world.	
"Ghannou Lil Hayat"	2021	Mohammad El Merdi; Nizar Francis	RedOne; Adil Khayat; Mehdi Bouamer	RedOne	Made for the 30th anniversary celebration of MBC Group founding where Ajram participated along with Hany Shaker, Majid Al Mohandis and RedOne.	
"Eish'ha B Afia" (with Hassan El Shafei · Marwan Pablo)	2022	Menna El Keiy; Marwan Pablo	Ehab Abd El Wahid; Marwan Pablo	Mohamed El Shaer	Released in collaboration with Afia Egypt and Magdi Yacoub Heart Foundation.	
"Naween"	2022	Unknown			Released in collaboration with Resala Charity Organization.	
"Ebtadet Layalina"	2026	Menna Elkiey	Aziz Elshafei	Osama Elhendy	Released by United Media Services in Egypt as the official song for its Ramadan 2026 TV drama lineup.	

== Soundtracks ==
Title	Year	Series / film	Writer	Music	Producer	Ref.
"Ya Ibn El Arandaly" (Intro)	2009	Ibn El Arandaly	Ayman Bahgat Amar	Mahmoud Talaat		
"Kol El Hekaya" (Outro)	2009	Ibn El Arandaly	Ayman Bahgat Amar	Mahmoud Talaat		
"Samara" (Intro)	2011	Samara	Hussein Mostafa Moharram	Mohammed Yehia	Tarek Abdel Gaber	
"Ala Fen Ya Samara" (Outro)	2011	Samara	Hussein Mostafa Moharram	Mohammed Yehia	Tarek Abdel Gaber	
"Sekak El Banat"	2012	Hekayat Banat	Ayman Bahgat Amar	Walid Saad	Tarek Madkour	
"Bannouta Bmeet Ragel"	2013	Bmeet Ragel (Radio Series)	Amir Teima	Jean-Marie Riachi		
"Maksouma Nossein" (Intro)	2015	Halet Eshk	Ayman Bahgat Amar	Waid Saad	Ahmed Ibrahim	
"Heya Helwa" (Outro)	2015	Halet Eshk	Ayman Bahgat Amar	Waid Saad	Ahmed Ibrahim	
"Aam Betghayar"	2018	Julia	Ahmad Madi	Ziad Bourji	Ahmed Ibrahim	
"El Omr"	2020	Sukkar Zeyada	Tamer Hussein	Walid Saad	Ahmed Ibrahim	
"Ma Tehkom Aa Hada"	2021	Raho	Mounir Abou Assaf	Nabil Ajram	Bassem Rizk	
"Ya Sater"	2022	U-Turn	Aziz Elshafei		Ahmed Adel	
"Akher Esdar"	2023	Sugar Daddy	Amr El Masry	Amr El Shazly	Amr El Khodary	
"Albi Ya Mehtas"	2024	Maasoom	Menna Elkeiy	Ehab Abd El Wahed	Ahmed Tarek Yehea	
"Ma2soum"	2024	Maasoom	Tamer Mahdy	Ehab Abd El Wahed	Coolpix Boy	
"Ma3 As7abna"	2025	Batal Al-Dalapheen	Tamer Hussein	Madian	Ahmed Adel	
"Bahen"	2026	The Crush	Ayman Bahgat Kamar	Aziz El Shafei	Nader Hamdy	

== Commercials ==
=== Coca-Cola slogans ===
Coca-Cola Middle East have always incorporated International Coke slogans into pan-Arab campaigns with Ajram. In 2007, Coca-Cola released their international trademark campaign of their popular slogan "The Coke Side of Life", which focused on themes such as fun, happiness, colors, and life. A collaboration with Nancy Ajram lead to the making of the song "El Dounya Helwa" (Life Is Beautiful) for which a commercial was filmed with an American director on international standards and hi-tech effects. Ajram insisted on filming in Lebanon which had been hit by war a while back. "El Dounya Helwa" is considered Coca-Cola Middle East's and Ajram's most successful commercial to date; the single became one of Ajram's most successful songs, leading to its release as a single track in a live album entitled El Dounya Helwa – Live. In 2009, as the campaign was sequeled internationally with "Open Happiness", Coke Middle East and Nancy released "Eftah Albak Tefrah". However, due to Nancy's pregnancy and giving birth, she was unable to participate in the print or TV campaigns that year and the song was used on the International commercial instead. A website was launched for that campaign entitled "Eftah Tefrah". Under the slogan "Doses of Happiness", "Farha Ala Farha" was released for 2012 Ramadan TV ad campaign. In 2010, Coca-Cola released an Arabic version of "Wavin' Flag "originally by Somali-Canadian singer K'naan. It titled "Shaggaa Bi Alamak" has herself featuring K'naan and meant for pan-Arab promotion of 2010 FIFA World Cup to be held in South Africa. In 2014, Coca-Cola released an Arabic version of "The World Is Ours" originally by Brazilian-American R&B singer David Correy featuring Brazilian percussion band Monobloco. It titled "Shejea Helmak" by herself with Algerian singer Cheb Khaled for the 2014 FIFA World Cup as well.

Title	Year	Writer	Music	Producer
"El Dounya Helwa"	2007	Ikram El Assi	Mohammed Raihm	Ashraf Abdou
"Eftah Albak Tefrah"	2009	Ayman Bahgat Amar	Mohammed Yehia	Tarek Madkour
"Wavin' Flag (Shaggaa Bi Alamak)" (with K'naan)	2010	Ayman Bahgat Amar	The Smeezingtons; Tarek Madkour	
"Farha Ala Farha"	2012	Unknown		
"The World Is Ours (Shejea Helmak)" (with David Correy and Khaled featuring Monobloco)	2014	Amir Teima	Mario Caldato Jr.; Rock Mafia; Hassan El Shafei	

=== Other jingles ===
Title	Year	Company and product	Wrtiter	Music	Producer	Ref.
"Awlady"	2011	Nesquik	Unknown			
"Papa Porto" (Note: Made about the cartoon mascot called Papa Porto created by Amer Group for Egypt's Porto Resorts as part of a promotional campaign.)	2011	Amer Group	Ayman Bahgat Amar	Mohammed Rahim	Karim Abdel Wahab	
"Bokra Tzeed Farhetna"	2018	Talaat Moustafa Group	Tamer Hussein	Amr Mostafa	Amin Nabil	
"Fark Kebir" (feat. Tamer Hosny)	2019	Orange	Menna Adly El Keaey	Ihab Abd El Wahed	Ahmad Tarek Yehia	
"Akwa Bekteer" (feat. Amir Karara)	2021	Etisalat	Tamer Mahdy	Ahmad Tarek Yehia; George Kolta		
"Bokra Yebdaa Men Elnaharda"	2021	Misr Life Insurance	Amir Teima	Amr Mostafa	Tooma	
