= Nancy Ajram videography =

Lebanese singer Nancy Ajram has released 8 video albums and more than 40 music videos, appeared in numerous television programs and 24 television commercials. In 1997, Ajram released her debut music for the single "Oulha Kelma", produced by Future TV. One year later, she signed a recording contract with EMI and released her second music video "Mihtagalak", taken from her debut studio album Mihtagalak (1998), directed by Lebanese director Elie Feghali. Like the debut album, only one music video was directed for her second album, Sheel Oyoonak Anni. Ajram generated much attention in 2003 following the release of the music video for "Akhasmak Ah", her third studio album Ya Salam's lead single, which was found controversial owing to the depiction of overtly sexual activities. However, she later received praise in mid-2003 for the visual for the album's second single and title track "Ya Salam", which received a Murex d'Or Award for its positive portrayal of a star with a sad life inspired from the 1960s. The video was directed by Nadine Labaki as a second collaboration with Ajram.

In 2004, Ajram released her fourth studio album Ah W Noss; four music videos for the singles "Ah W Noss", "Lawn Ouyounak", "Oul Tani Keda" and "Inta Eyh" from the album were shot. The lead single's video was directed by Nadine Labaki and was highlighted for portraying an Egyptian villager. The music video for "Oul Tani Keda", which was served as Coca-Cola campaign single, was filmed with the international Italian director Luca Tomassini, it was made of footage of backstage scenes from the commercial. Ajram's 2006 studio album Ya Tabtab...Wa Dallaa was promoted by six music videos, and her 2007 studio album for children Shakhbat Shakhabit received its promotion from the medley video which features four different tracks, directed by Said El Marouk.

In 2008, Ajram released her sixth studio album Betfakkar Fi Eih, which spawned five music videos. The release of Ajram's seven album Nancy 7 (2010) was preceded by the music videos for its singles "Fi Hagat", "Sheikh El Shabab", which garnered her three awards, and "Ya Kether", which features Syrian actor Kosai Khauli as Ajram's lover. In 2012, Ajram released her second studio album for children Super Nancy, accompanied by a medley music video of same name, her daughters Mila and Ella were featured in the video. In 2014, Nancy 8's lead single video "Ma Tegi Hena" met with criticism and controversy for its sexual imagery, many critics compared it to her breakthrough hit, "Akhasmak Ah". However, Nancy 8 spawned another four music videos.

In addition to her music videos, Ajram has released eight video albums. two DVDs Live at the Jerash Festival 2004 and Ma La Ta'arifunahu An Nancy Ajram were filmed in accompaniment with Ajram's concert in Jordan (2004) and concert tour in USA (2005). Meanwhile the other video albums The Best of Nancy Clips (2008) and Video Clips 2 (2010) were released in the Middle East featuring live performances and music videos. She has additionally appeared in several television shows, including the reality television series Arab Idol, of which three out of four seasons saw her contribution as a judge, and The Voice Kids, where she served as a coach.

== Music videos ==
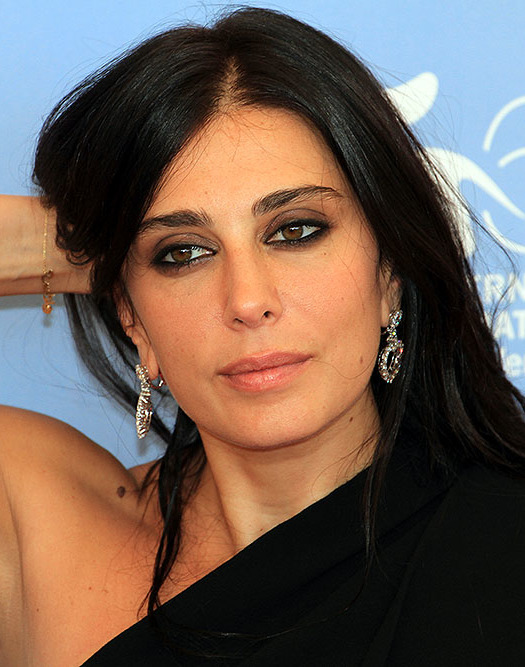
Eight of Ajram's videos have been directed by Nadine Labaki

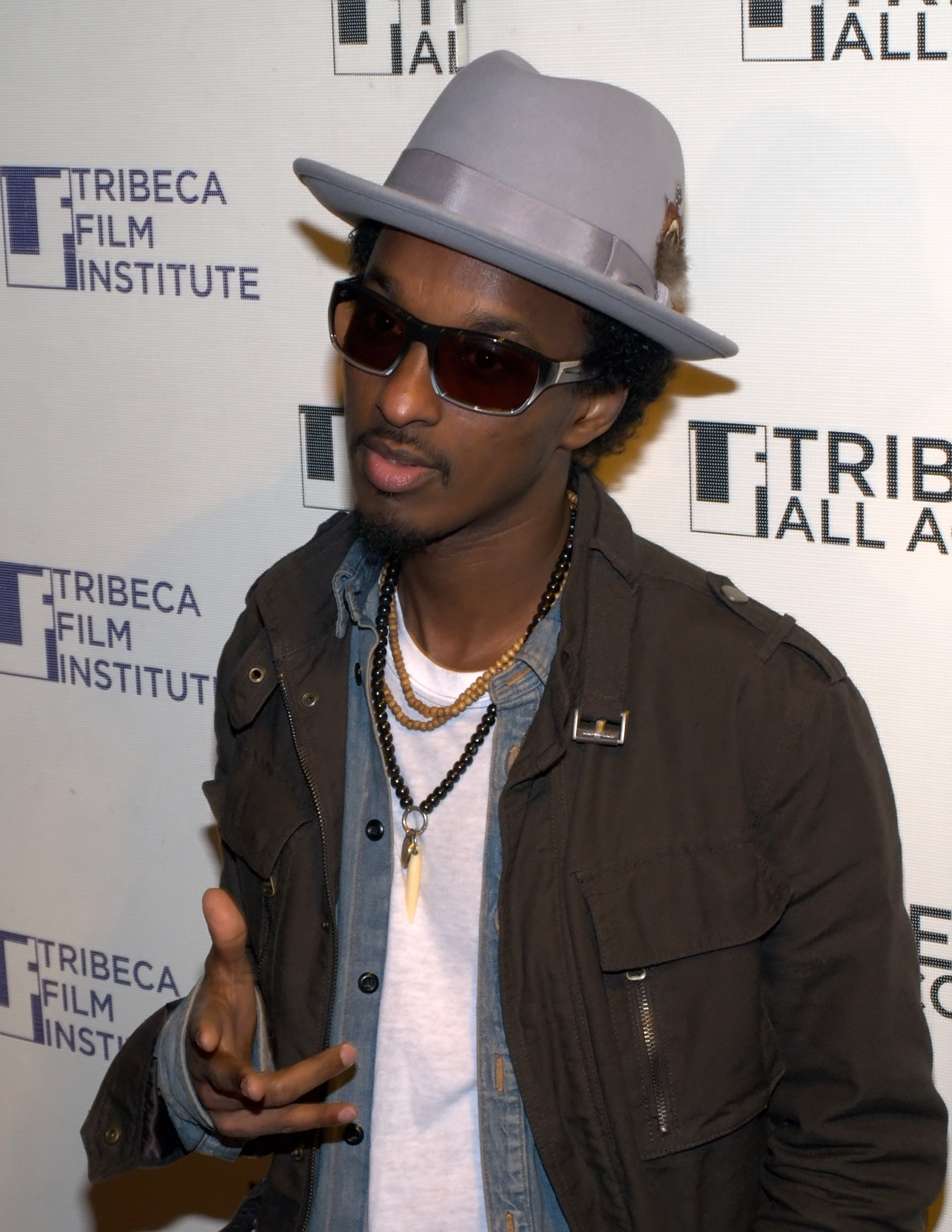
K'naan features in "Shaggaa Bi Alamak" (Wavin' Flag)

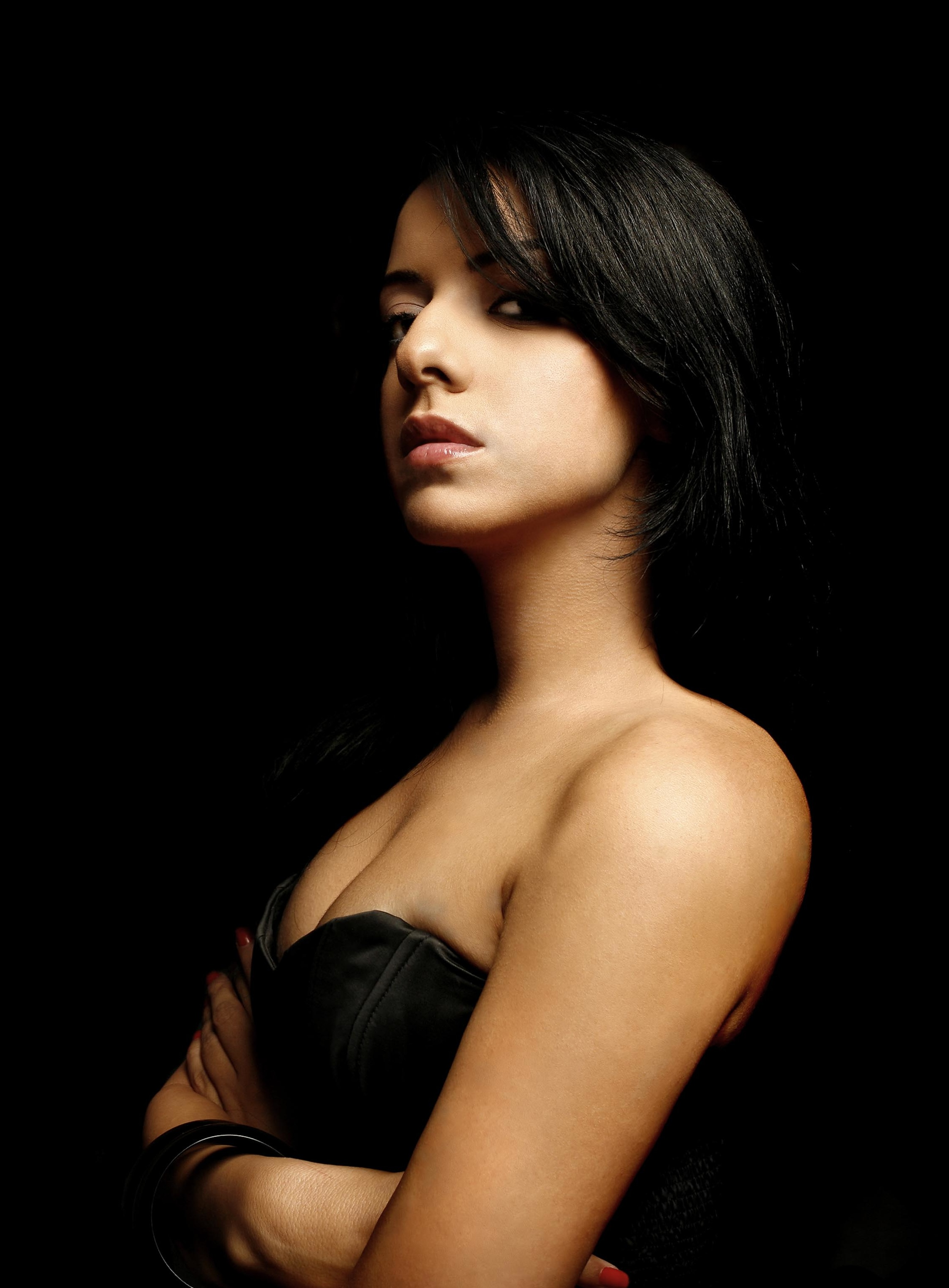
Leila Kanaan directed more than ten of Ajram's music videos

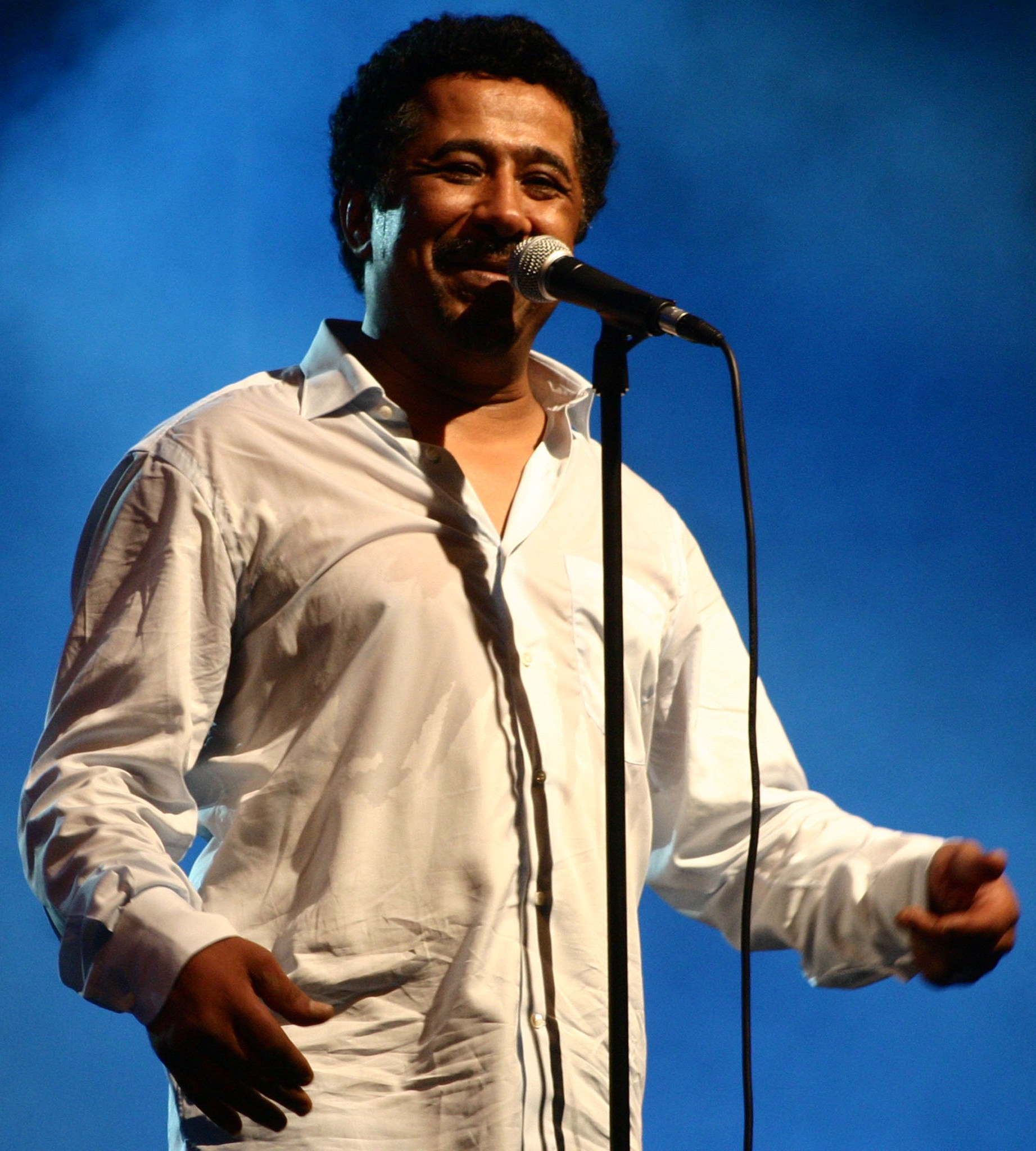
Khaled features in "Shaggaa Helmak"

Year	Title	Album	Director(s)	Description	Ref.
1997	"Oulha Kelma"	Non-album single	Ali El Darzi	Ajram's debut music video.	
1998	"Mihtagalak"	Mihtagalak	Elie Feghali	Ajram lonely in a Cafe.	
2001	"Sheel Oyoonak Anni"	Sheel Oyoonak Anni	Guy Zahlan	Shows the life of a singer stalked by cameras and paparazzi.	
2002	"Akhasmak Ah"	Ya Salam	Nadine Labaki	Ajram's breakthrough hit video. Appears as a seductive cafe manager.	
2003	"Ya Salam"	Ya Salam	Nadine Labaki	Part of "Akhasmak Ah" performed at intro. Ajram portrays a star with a sad life inspired from the 1960s.	
2003	"Yay"	Ya Salam	Nadine Labaki	Ajram, a Beirut salon hairdresser, is charmed by her lover at first sight.	
2004	"Ah W Noss"	Ah W Noss	Nadine Labaki	Egyptian villager who escapes her stalker, the video with Ajram's famous icon of washing clothes by hand.	
2004	"Lawn Ouyounak"	Ah W Noss	Nadine Labaki	A sequel to the video of "Yay" where Ajram is now a bride in a traditional Lebanese wedding. Traditional wedding beats and chants added at the beginning of the song.	
2005	"Oul Tani Keda"	Ah W Noss	Luca Tommassini	Video made of footage of backstage scenes from Ajram's first Coca-Cola commercial.	
2005	"Inta Eyh"	Ah W Noss	Nadine Labaki	In this drama, Ajram portrays a sad wife who discovers that her husband is cheating on her with her best friend. Ajram wakes up at dawn and cries in the bathroom recalling events.	
2006	"Ya Tabtab"	Ya Tabtab...Wa Dallaa	Nadine Labaki	Ajram is a beggar, part of a little on-the-go circus and entertains as a clown to get money.	
2006	"Moegaba"	Ya Tabtab...Wa Dallaa	Harry Rankin and Mike Lipscombe	Continues Ajram's fourth Coca-Cola commercial with the circus theme.	
2006	"Ana Yalli Bhebbak"	Ya Tabtab...Wa Dallaa	Pascale D'Ash	Continues Ajram's first DAMAS Jewellery (Farfasha) commercial. Ajram enters a bored cafe which is brought to life with the discovery of her identity and her new song, in a fun and simple video.	
2006	"Ehsas Jdeed"	Ya Tabtab...Wa Dallaa	Said El Marouk	Extended Version. Ajram falls in love with whom she discovers to be a deaf and mute man.	
2007	"Elli Kan"	Ya Tabtab...Wa Dallaa	Diamantino Ferreira	Continues Ajram's second DAMAS Farfasha commercial where Ajram is a college student who falls in love with her stalker.	
2007	"Mishtaga Leik"	Ya Tabtab...Wa Dallaa	Mirna Khayat	Ajram is a lonely wife of a pilot who is away from home.	
2007	"Shakhbat Shakhabit" (ft. Katkouta, Shater, Eid Milad)	Shakhbat Shakhabit (Children's Album)	Said El Marouk	Medley of four songs. Ajram is a kindergarten teacher who tells the story portraying a fairy, mother, and teacher, respectively for each song and the credits.	
2008	"Risala Lil Aalam"	Shakhbat Shakhabit (Children's Album)	Fadi Haddad	A fully graphical world with images of sad children where Ajram sings about peace.	
2008	"Betfakkar Fi Eih"	Betfakkar Fi Eih	Said El Marouk	Ajram with an electric guitar on a clocktower, her date chases their movie tickets all over the city until it's too late.	
2008	"Min Dally Nseek"	Betfakkar Fi Eih	Said El Marouk	Additional musical intros and outros. Continuing the story of the rich girl who falls in love with the poor and deaf man in "Ehsas Jdeed", we step into their lives as a married couple with their ups and downs, and Ajram is in for a surprise about her husband.	
2009	"Lamset Eed"	Betfakkar Fi Eih	Leila Kanaan	Extended Version. In a short-movie drama in times of war, Ajram plays the role of a lady separated from her lover, a resistance leader, who helps him by transmitting secret information about the enemy.	
2009	"Ibn El Giran"	Betfakkar Fi Eih	Mike Harris	Continues Ajram's third Damas Jewellery (Farfasha) commercial. Ajram walks around in her old neighborhood.	
2009	"Mashi Haddi"	Betfakkar Fi Eih	Leila Kanaan	In a strange, colorful world, Ajram is annoyed by her self-obsessed boyfriend who flirts with women everywhere; yet, she always manages to give him reason to regret it.	
2010	"Meen Ghairy Ana (Noss El Kawn)"	Betfakkar Fi Eih	Yehya Saade	Cancelled	
2010	"Shaggaa Bi Alamak (Wavin' Flag)" (feat. K'naan)	Non-album single	Codirector: Leila Kanaan	Ajram performs in Arabic with K'naan in the official 2010 FIFA World Cup Coke song.	
2010	"Fi Hagat"	Nancy 7	Nadine Labaki	Ajram portrays a wife who experiences a cold, distant marriage, suffering as she hides her feelings.	
2010	"Sheikh El Shabab"	Nancy 7	Leila Kanaan	Ajram lives in a village resort with her grandmother, portraying a brat that always sneaks at the guys who visit.	
2011	"Ya Kether"	Nancy 7	Sophie Boutros	A dramatic and complicated love story between two lovers, which ends happily.	
2011	"Emta Hashofak"	Nancy 7	Leila Kanaan	Cancelled	
2012	"Super Nancy" (ft. "Ya Banat", "Baousi", "Stoohi")	Super Nancy (Children's Album)	Leila Kanaan	Medley of three songs, Ajram portrays a "super" woman in a wonderland.	
2012	"Badak Teb'a Fik"	Non-album single	Waleed Nassif	Continues Ajram's fifth Damas Jewellery (Farfasha) commercial. Ajram rebels against her boyfriend.	
2013	"Aamel Aekla"	Non-album single	Waleed Nassif	A social media music video all around which presents Ajram interacting with her fans to punish her boyfriend.	
2014	"Ma Tegi Hena"	Nancy 8	Joe Bou Eid	Ajram is a watermelon merchant that gets in trouble with a local policeman.	
2014	"Shaggaa Helmak" (feat. Cheb Khaled)	Non-album single	Jeff T. Thomas	Ajram performs with Cheb Khaled in the official 2014 FIFA World Cup Coke song.	
2014	"Mouch Far'a Ktir"	Nancy 8	Said El Marouk	Ajram tries to get over her ex-boyfriend who cheated on her, during the video she remembers their good times together but eventually makes the decision to break up and gives him his stuff back.	
2014	"Ma Awedak"	Nancy 8	Fadi Haddad	The story revolves around a royal love-story between two princes in a palace where they had grown up together.	
2014	"Yalla"	Nancy 8	Angy Jammal	Ajram plays a high school student leading a double life, when she is not having a crush on one hunky curly-haired boy during the day, she is the superstar Nancy by night.	
2015	"W Bkoun Jayi Wadeak"	Nancy 8	Fadi Haddad	Ajram appears in a beautiful and romantic performance.	
2015	"Men El Yawm"	Nancy 8	Joe Bou Eid	Cancelled	
2017	"Hassa Beek"	Nancy 9	Leila Kanaan	Ajram plays the radiant role of an old Hollywood movie star in the midst of a steamy love affair.	
2018	"W Maak"	Nancy 9	Leila Kanaan	Ajram in an old-school American-style diner, dressed in a metallic baseball jacket and denim shorts and getting weirdly over-familiar with the venue's jukebox.	
2018	"Badna Nwalee El Jaw"	Non-album single	Samir Syriani	Ajram and her fellows walk into a house full of depressed people and change the atmosphere by singing and dancing.	
2019	"El Hob Zay El Watar"	Nancy 9	Leila Kanaan	Ajram is shown in a white dress, walking in nature and singing about her love.	
2020	"Albi Ya Albi"	Non-album single	Raja Nehme	Ajram is in a room while recording a video and the music video is occasionally shown through her lens.	
2021	"Salamat"	Nancy 10	Samir Syriani	Ajram and two of her friends have a stroll around the city at night.	
2021	"Miyye w Khamsin"	Nancy 10	Leila Kanaan	Ajram plays the role of a hotel receptionist who gets enchanted by a handsome customer.	
2022	"Ma Te'tezer"	Nancy 10	Samir Syriani	Ajram appears in the role of a wife who's struggling with her husband's drug addiction.	
2022	"Sah Sah" (with Marshmello)	Non-album single	Sarah McColgan	Ajram performs with Marshmello in a night club.	
2022	"Aala Shanak"	Nancy 10	Leila Kanaan	Ajram travels through the streets of India while performing the song.	
2022	"Ya Eid"	Non-album single	Samir Syriani	Ajram and her family appear in front of the camera to celebrate the festive season.	
2023	"Baddi Hada Hebbou"	Nancy 10	Samir Syriani	Ajram appears in the role of a lonely woman who dreams of sharing her life with someone.	
2023	"Tegy Nenbeset"	Non-album single	Leila Kanaan	Ajram and her friends dance and socialize at a poolside resort.	
2024	"Meshkeltak Alwahidi"	Nancy 10	Hass Ghaddar	Ajram appears solo on stage while reciting the song's lyrics.	
2024	"Men Nazra"	Non-album single	Samir Syriani	Ajram appears in the role of a woman who wants to capture the attention of her neighbor by throwing stunts at his doorstep.	
2025	"Toul Omri Negma"	Non-album single	Richa Sarkis	Ajram appears in the role of a woman who is going through divorce proceedings.	
2025	"Warana Eh"	Non-album single	Eli Rezkallah	Ajram's character dances and parties on the street alongside a group of friends.	
2025	"Ya Albo"	Nancy 11	Samir Syriani	Ajram and her friends walk into a restaurant and she tried to seduce a man at a business meeting.	
2025	"Sidi Ya Sidi"	Nancy 11	Raja Nehme	Ajram is shown in dance and stylized set pieces against a backdrop featuring performance-centric visuals.	
2026	"Shhadi Ya Deni"	Non-album single	Angy Akly Jammal		
2026	"Bastafizzak"	Non-album single	Joe Bou Eid		

== Other videos ==
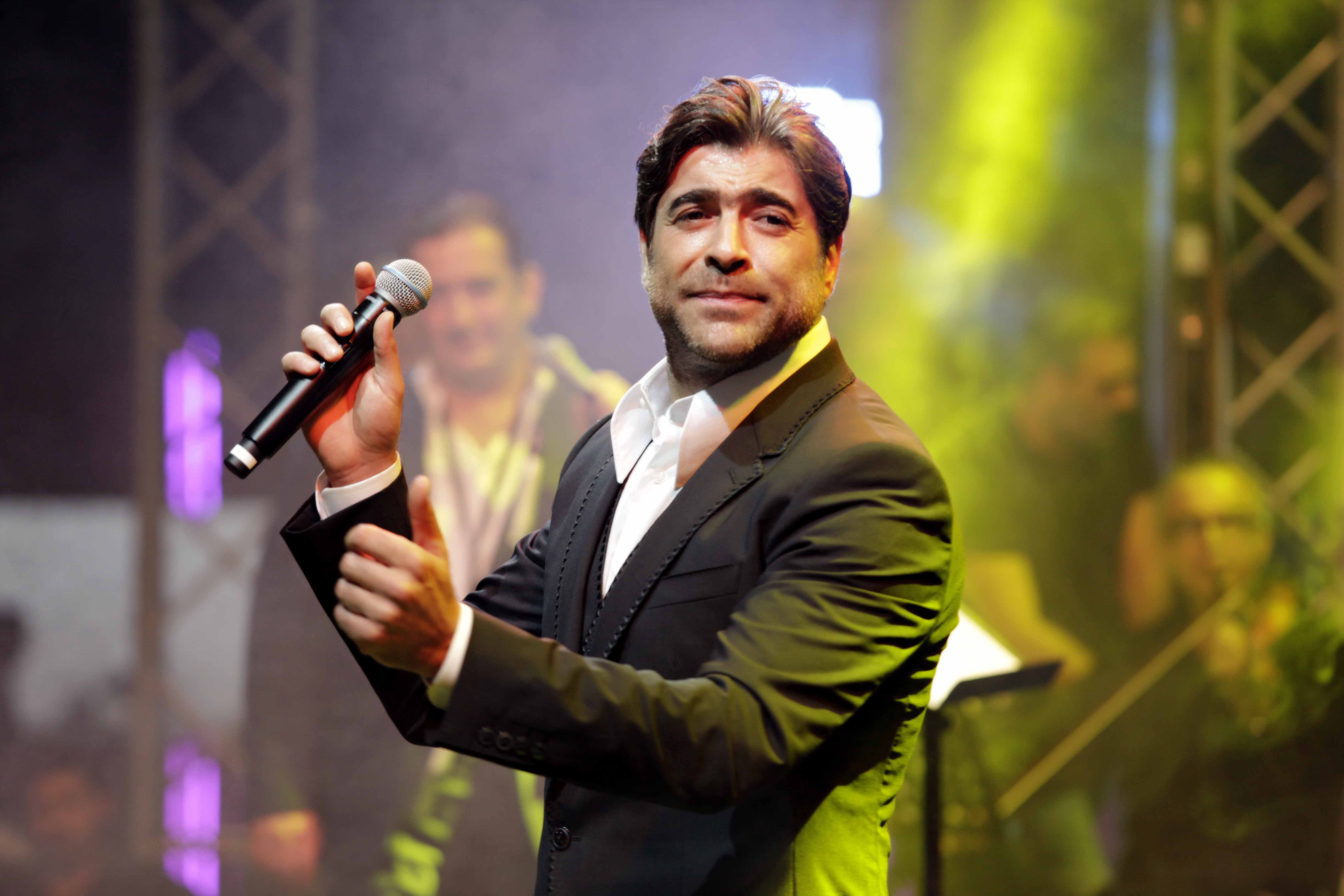
Wael Kfoury features in three videos

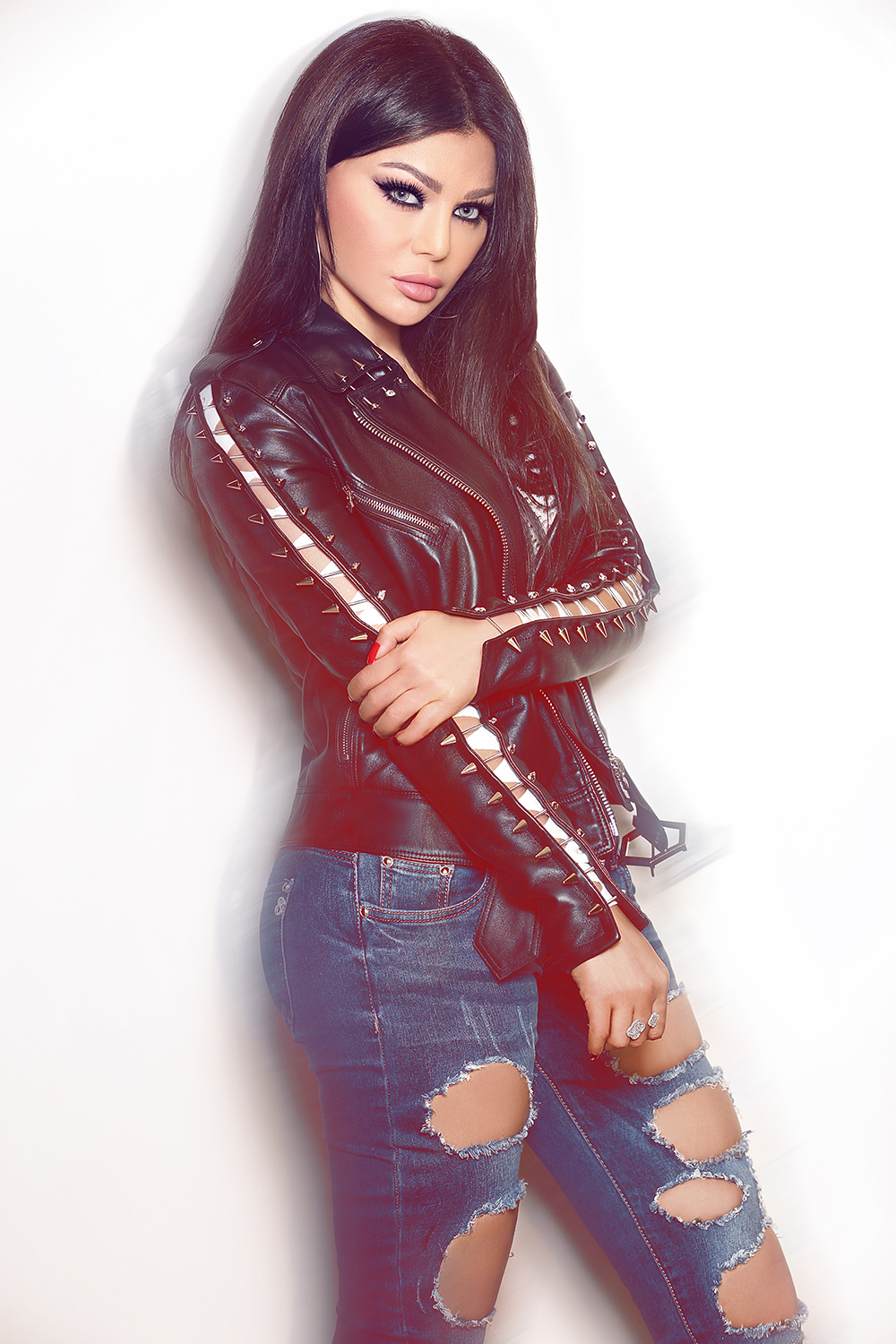
Haifa Wehbe features in two videos

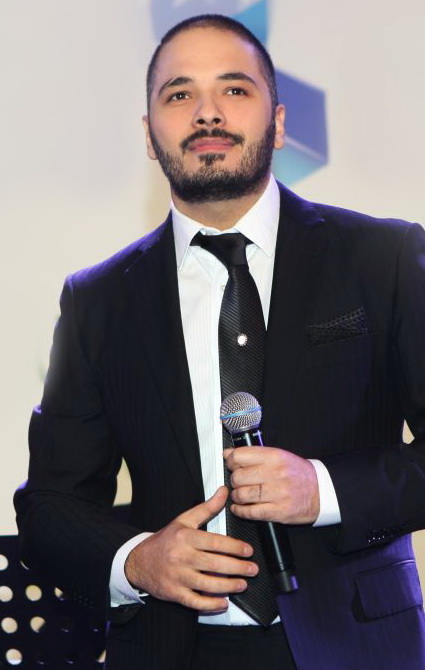
Ramy Ayach features in "La Ma Khelset El Hekayi"

Year	Title	Director(s)	Description	Ref.
2003	"Nasseyto Garho"	Sameh Abdel Aziz	Made exclusively for Ajram's interview with Hala Sarhan in El Hawa Hawana on Dream TV. The track is taken from Ya Salam album.	
2003	"Elha'ni"	Leila Bazzi and Fouad Sleiman	Official video for Beirut Marathon. Ajram participated along with Yuri Mraqqadi, Dina Hayek, Zein El Omr, Haifa Wehbe, Joe Ashkar and music producer Guy Manoukian.	
2005	"La Ma Khelset El Hekayi"	Tony Kahwaji	For the assassination of late president Rafic Hariri. Ajram participated along with Sabah, Nawal Al Zoghbi, Haifa Wehbe, Wael Kfoury, Amal Hijazi, Maya Nasri, Melhem Zein, Ramy Ayach and others.	
2006	"Ana Masry"	Hadi El Bagoury	Timed to coincide with Egypt's hosting and winning of the African Cup of Nations football tournament, taking it by storm. It was filmed by Mobinil sponsors and not Ajram, which is the reason it isn't considered of her videos. It rather shows Egyptians representing the diversity of the country lip-sync the patriotic lyrics of the song.	
2006	"Habib El Omr"	Unknown	Dedicated for Lebanon. It was released before the 2006 Lebanon War, however the video shows her singing in the studio was released after and for the war.	
2007	"Khalleek Bwejj El Ghadab"	Tony Kahwaji	Dedicated for the Lebanese army after the 2007 Lebanon conflict.	
2008	"Al Dhameer Al Arabi"	Ahmed Alarian	The sequel to the well-known "El Helm El Arabi" where Ajram participated along with more than a hundred other artists, including Wadih El Safi, Assala Nasri, Latifa and Cheb Khaled.	
2011	"Wahshani Ya Masr"	Fadi Haddad	Dedicated to Egypt after the Egyptian revolution of 2011.	
2011	"Papa Porto	Sherif Gamal	Made about the cartoon mascot called Papa Porto for Egypt's Porto Resorts as part of a promotional campaign. The video features the cartoon character having fun at the resort.	
2012	"Jaysh Lubnan"	Waleed Nassif	Operette made for the Lebanese Army 67th anniversary where Ajram participated along with Assi El Helani, Wael Kfoury, Nawal Al Zoghbi and Samir Sfeir.	
2015	"Al Baraka"	Mohammed Younes	Dedicated to celebrate the launch of the New Suez Canal. The video showcases Egyptians celebrating the Suez Canal by dancing and waving Egyptian flags.	
2016	"Wahashtouna"	Wassim Succar	Made for the opening of Arab Idol fourth season where Ajram joined her fellow judges Wael Kfoury, Ahlam and Hassan El Shafei.	
2019	"Ragel Ebn Ragel"	Batoul Arafa	Dedicated to Egypt.	
2020	"Ila Beirut Al Ontha"	Samir Syriani	Dedicated to Beirut.	
2021	"Emmi"	Samir Syriani	Released ahead of the Mother's Day in the Arab world.	
2023	"Akher Esdar"	Mahmoud Karim	Released as part of the soundtrack for the movie Sugar Daddy.	
2025	"Ma3 As7abna"		Released as part of the soundtrack for the movie Batal Al-Dalapheen.	

== Video albums ==
=== Live video albums ===
Title	Album details	Description	Ref.
Live at the Jerash Festival 2004	Released: June 19, 2005; Label: EMI; Formats: DVD	Features her concert at Jerash Festival in Jordan, where Ajram performed on July 28, 2004, in support of her fourth studio album Ah W Noss.	

=== Documentary video albums ===
Title	Album details	Description	Ref.
Ma La Ta'arifunahu An Nancy Ajram (Behind The Scenes)	Released: 2005; Label: MBC Group; Formats: DVD	Documentary and "behind the scenes" footage, filmed in Lebanon and USA during Ajram's 2005 US tour.	

=== Music video albums ===
Title	Album details	Description	Ref.
Ah W Noss: Collector's Edition	Released: July 16, 2006; Label: EMI; Formats: DVD, CD, digital download	Contains two discs—music videos and live performances on one disc and digitally remastered album on the other.	
Ya Salam: Collector's Edition	Released: February 14, 2007; Label: EMI; Formats: DVD, CD, digital download	Contains two discs—music videos and live performances on one disc and digitally remastered album on the other.	
Shakhbat Shakhabit	Released: 2007; Label: EWE Productions; Formats: DVD	Contains the medley music video of four tracks from the album.	
The Best of Nancy Clips	Released: 2008; Label: Arabic Recorded Music (ARM); Formats: DVD	Features one live performance and eight music videos for songs from her fourth and fifth studio albums, Ah W Noss (2004) and Ya Tabtab...Wa Dallaa (2006).	
Greatest Hits – The DVD	Released: 2010; Label: EMI; Formats: DVD, CD, digital download	Contains thirteen music videos for songs from her first five studio albums released between 1998–2006 and two other two live performances.	
Video Clips 2	Released: 2010; Label: Arabic Recorded Music (ARM); Formats: DVD	Features two live performances and eight music videos released between 2006 and 2010.	

== Commercials ==
Year	Company and product	Theme song(s)	Director	Description	Ref.
2003	Melody Entertainment	"Akhasmak Ah"	Ahmed Mahdi	Ajram filmed two advertisements for Melody Hits channel. In the first one she talks to the viewer explaining about the channel's SMS and song codes and the way to use them. The second is a ringtone ad where the hero is awakened by an "Akhasmak Ah" tone that brings Ajram herself dancing to him until it's over.	
2005	Coca-Cola	"Oul Tani Keda"	Luca Tommassini	Three versions were made for this ad. In the first one Ajram is bored in a cafe and Coke brings it alive to a concert. The second is an instrumental edit, Coke beats only in the cafe, ending with Ajram's Laugh. The last one is a concert edit, Ajram only appears on stage throughout the commercial.	
2005	Coca-Cola	"Lawn Ouyounak" (Instrumental)	Mike Lipscome	Ajram laughs as she is tickled by Coca-Cola Fizz.	
2005	Coca-Cola	"Lawn Ouyounak" (Instrumental)	Mike Lipscome	A stranger splashes ice into Coke, and every time Ajram's dress flies up for photographers in the famous Marilyn Monroe portrait.	
2005	Coca-Cola	"Lawn Ouyounak" (Instrumental)	Mike Lipscome	Ajram winks as she drinks Coke.	
2005	Coca-Cola	"Moegaba"	Mike Lipscombe	Audience watch as the magician performs, but then the hero performs a more impressive magical trick giving Ajram the Coke. The circus explodes with life with an Ajram concert and performance much inspired by Moulin Rouge or Cirque Du Soleil.	
2006	Damas Jewellery (World Gold Council)	"Ana Yalli"	Pascale D'ash	Ajram enters a bored cafe which is brought to life as her identity is revealed and the new song played.	
2006	Coca-Cola	"Ashtiki Menno"	Unknown	The Coke bottle's curves match Ajram's as she dances.	
2007	Damas Jewellery (World Gold Council)	"Elli Kan"	Diamantino Ferreira	Ajram's stalker buys her the jewellery he's seen her try out.	
2007	Coca-Cola	"El Dounya Helwa"	Unknown	Flying colors brighten up the world as Ajram hands out Coke to everyone.	
2008	Coca-Cola	"Meen Ghairy Ana"	Manfredo Leteo	Original version: Ajram hosts a celebration with Coke and her brand new hit.	
2008	Coca-Cola	"Meen Ghairy Ana"	Manfredo Leteo	Acapella version: Ajram teases a kid in a cafe while she enjoys her Coke and makes him laugh.	
2008	Coca-Cola	"Meen Ghairy Ana"	Manfredo Leteo	Instrumental version: . A tired rockstar is refreshed and energized until the last drop of her Coke can.	
2009	Damas Jewellery (World Gold Council)	"Ibn El Giran"	Mike Harris	Ajram walks around in her old neighborhood.	
2009	Sony Ericsson	"Wana Ben Ideik" and "Betfakkar Fe Eih"	Leila Kanaan	Promoting the Nancy special edition Sony Ericsson Walkman Phone, a pink version of the Sony Ericsson W595, with her signature on it. The commercial shows Ajram and her band appear with the phone's shake control as a guy tries to please his date, changing the mood from romantic to rock.	
2009	UNICEF	None	Joe Bou Eid	Ajram appeared in the UNICEF's commercial marking the 20th anniversary of the Convention on the Rights of the Child, joining other influential Middle Eastern celebrities such as Kathem Al-Saher, Saber El Rebai, Mahmoud Kabil, Khaled Abol Naga, Djamel Laroussi, Caresse Bashar, Fayez Al Malki and Iranian actress Mahtab Keramati.	
2010	Lactel	None	Manfredo Leteo	Ajram appears as a celebrity filming an outdoor talk show interview.	
2011	Nesquik	"Awlady"	Unknown	Ajram only provided vocals in a 15-second song for this advertisement.	
2011	Nissan	"Lessa Gayya A'ollo"	Marc Chalhoub	Promoting the 2012 brand new Nissan Micra car.	
2011	Damas Jewellery (World Gold Council)	"Meen El Ma Ando"	Marc Hadife	Promoting the Farfasha Collection campaign through a re-signed contract. In the main commercial Ajram portrays as having fun with her friends during a night out in downtown Beirut.	
2012	Fonterra	"Okay"	Oliver Ojeil	Promoting Anlene, a nutrient-rich adult milk formulated for optimal bone health.	
2013	Bambi (by Sanita)	"Shater" (new version)	Unknown	Ajram only provided vocals in a new version of "Shater" song, with a different lyrics fitting the brand, for this advertisement to promote the new and improved diaper.	
2014	Huawei	"Nam Bi Albi"	Said El Marouk	Promoting the brand new Huawei Ascend Mate 7 smartphone.	
2015	Home Centre	None	Mikon van Gastel	Promoting the Home Centre collection of furniture and household items. The commercial focuses on the enjoyment associated with returning home.	
2015	Bambi (by Sanita)	None	Said El Marouk	Ajram joined Sanita's Bambi as the spokesperson for its new TV ad campaign under the slogan "Allem Walad, Btebni Balad" (Educate a Child for a Better Tomorrow).	
2016	Home Centre	None	Unknown	Promoting the launch of All New Home Centre accessories and home decoration at Mall of the Emirates.	
2018	Persil	None	Unknown	Ajram joined Henkel's Persil as the brand ambassador for its new TV ad campaign in the Middle East.	
2019	Orange Egypt	"Fark Kebir"	Marwan Hamed	Under the slogan "Small things make a big difference", Ajram joined Orange Egypt as the spokesperson for its Ramadan TV ad campaign alongside Tamer Hosny.	
2021	Etisalat	"Akwa Bekteer"	Tamer Mahdy	Ajram joined Etisalat as the spokesperson for its Ramadan TV ad campaign alongside Amir Karara.	
2021	Misr Life Insurance	"Bokra Yebdaa Men Elnaharda"	Adham Elsherif	Ajram only provided vocals for this TV ad campaign.	
2026	United Media Services	"Ebtadet Layalina"	Hossam L. Hossainy	Ajram joined voiced the official song for the United Media Services in Egypt for its Ramadan 2026 TV drama lineup.	

== Video awards and nominations ==
Year	Title	Director	Award	Result	Ref.
2003	"Akhasmak Ah"	Nadine Labaki	Video Clip Festival	Won	
2003	"Ya Salam"	Nadine Labaki	Murex d'Or	Won	
2004	"Lawn Ouyounak"	Nadine Labaki	Murex d'Or	Won	
2004	"Lawn Ouyounak"	Nadine Labaki	Zahrat Al Khaleej Magazine	Won	
2005	"Inta Eyh"	Nadine Labaki	Murex d'Or	Nominated	
2006	"Ehsas Jdeed"	Said El Marouk	Murex d'Or	Won	
2008	"Min Dally Nseek"	Said El Marouk	Murex d'Or	Nominated	
2008	"Min Dally Nseek"	Said El Marouk	Melody Hits	Won	
2009	"Lamset Eed"	Leila Kanaan	Murex d'Or	Won	
2009	"Mashi Haddi"	Leila Kanaan	Murex d'Or	Nominated	
2009	"Mashi Haddi"	Leila Kanaan	Middle East Music Awards	Nominated	
2010	"Fi Hagat"	Nadine Labaki	LBC	Won	
2010	"Fi Hagat"	Nadine Labaki	Zahrat Al Khaleej Magazine	Won	
2010	"Sheikh El Shabab"	Leila Kanaan	Stars Cafe Magazine Awards	Won	
2011	"Sheikh El Shabab"	Leila Kanaan	Murex d'Or	Won	
2011	"Sheikh El Shabab"	Leila Kanaan	Middle East Music Awards	Won	
2011	"Ya Kether"	Sophie Boutros	Stars Cafe Magazine Awards	Won	
2012	"Super Nancy"	Leila Kanaan	Music Nation Website	Won	
2015	"Ma Awedak"	Fadi Haddad	Murex d'Or	Won	
2015	"Yalla"	Angy Jammal	Murex d'Or	Nominated	
2015	"Ma Tegi Hena"	Joe Bou Eid	Murex d'Or	Won	
2018	"Hassa Beek"	Leila Kanaan	Murex d'Or	Nominated	
2018	"W Maak"	Leila Kanaan	Clipped Music Video Festival	Nominated	
2018	"W Maak"	Leila Kanaan	International Music Video Underground Festival	Nominated	
2018	"W Maak"	Leila Kanaan	Accolade Global Film Competition	Won	
2018	"W Maak"	Leila Kanaan	Queen Palm International Festival	Won	
2021	"Ila Beirut Al Ontha"	Samir Syriani	Murex d'Or	Won	
