= Alama Fi Hyatak =

Alama Fi Hyatak علامة في حياتك

Studio album by Amr Mostafa
- Released: 2008
- Genres: Pop rock; Latin
- Length: 36:30
- Label: Alam El Phan

Amr Mostafa chronology
Ayamy (2007)	Alama Fi Hyatak علامة في حياتك (2008)	Al Kebeer Kebeer (2009)

Alama Fi Hyatak (Arabic : علامة في حياتك ), is a studio album by Amr Mostafa released in 2008. This album was a huge success for Mostafa, winning the EMI Ultimate Album of the Year Award in 2008 and selling more than 150 thousand copies outside Egypt to become the best-selling album of the year. Amr worked with western music arrangers in all of the album's songs, trying to mix Mediterranean music culture and Western music culture and introduce a new type of music in Egypt. It contains ten tracks all composed by Amr Mostafa.

== Music video ==
"Awel Ma Oul" was chosen to be the music video for the album and aired on the Mazzika TV music Channel.

== Track listing ==
1. "Awel Ma Oul" - أول ما أقول - (First thing to say) (Arranger: TONI & XASQUI & rocket) - 3:18
2. "Alama Fi Hyatak" - علامة في حياتك - (A Sign In Your Life) (Arranger: Emre & Ahmed Adel) - 3:55
3. "Yaraet" - ياريت - (I Hope) (Arranger: Gergo & Gabor) - 3:26
4. "Helemt Beek" - حلمت بيك - (I Dreamed Of You) (Arranger: TONI & XASQUI) - 3:52
5. "Yeshhad Alaya" - بشهد عليا - (His Love Witnesses me) (Arranger: Tamas Kelemen) - 3:37
6. "Sraht Feek" - سرحت فيك - (I Thought About You) (Arranger: Gergo & Gabor) - 3:07
7. "Mansash" - منساش - (I Won't Forget) (Arranger: Emre Onbayrakbar) - 3:37
8. "Za'alan Alek" - زعلان عليك - (Sad For You) (Arranger: Tamas Kelemen) - 3:50
9. "Ayamna Fen" - أيامنا فين - (Where Are Our Days?) (Arranger: Gergo & Gabor) - 3:26
10. "Yeshhad Alayya (remix)" - يشهد عليا - (His Love Witnesses Me (ReMix) (Arranger: Tamas Kelemen) - 4:18

== Lyricists ==
- Tamer Hussien Wrote (Alama Fi Hyatak, Sraht Feek, Mansash, Za'alan Alek)
- Khaled Tag el Din Wrote (Yeshhad Alayya, Awel Ma Oul, Helemt Beek, Yaraet)
- Ezz El-din Wrote (Ayamna Fen)
