= Al Molhed =

2014 Egyptian film

- Directed by: Nader Seif El Din
- Written by: Nader Seif El Din
- Produced by: Mohamed Darwish Adham Afify
- Starring: Mohamed Hisham Mohamed Abdel Aziz Yasmine Gamal Hassan Eid Sabry Abdel Moniem Leila Ezz El Arab
- Music by: Tamer Hussein
- Release date: 26 February 2014
- Country: Egyptian
- Language: Egyptian Arabic

Al-Molhed (Arabic: الملحد; The Atheist) is a 2014 Egyptian movie directed by Nader Seif El Din and is starring Mohamed Hisham, Mohamed Abdel Aziz, Yasmine Gamal, Hassan Eid, Sabry Abdel Moniem, Leila Ezz El Arab. The poet Tamer Hussien composed the movie songs.

Based on a true story, the film Al-Molhed tells the story of a man who starts entertaining the thought of becoming an atheist. As the son of a known Muslim preacher, the decision incurs the ire of his family and friends, considering the religious background he has.

The movie is the first Arab film to directly address the highly sensitive issue of atheism in Arab and Muslim societies. The background of the collapse of Hosni Mubarak regime, and the election of the Muslim Brotherhood’s candidate Mohammed Morsi to the presidency of Egypt in 2012, caused dissensions revolve around the issue of theism and disbelief especially in the recent events and the rise of the Islamists which will imposing new restrictions on all sorts of art and apply the Islamic rules. The movie deals with all the concerns of the Egyptian citizens.

== Plot ==
Al-Molhed deals with the story of the son of a famous Islamic preacher who grows up in normal circumstances as a believer who and fasts like the rest of the people. But due to external circumstances, the son turns into an atheist, and events continue until he returns to Islam again.

== Issue ==
The original release date of Al-Molhed was January 2013, but then delayed to February 2014 due to one of the scenes that the censors objected to and asked to be modified, which made the producer modify the scene according to the desire of the censorship to obtain permission to show. After the film had been released, several Egyptian cinemas refused to receive the film and show it inside them for fear of being exposed to the anger of protesters over its content, which made the distributors decide to distribute the work with only 15 copies.

Al-Azhar approved the screening of the film after making modifications to the script, and the censorship authority for works allowed the film to be shown without removing any scenes but under the banner "Adults Only".

== Reception ==
Al-Molhed received polarised reviews, especially on social sites.

- The film's producer, Adham Afifi, and director Nader Seif El-Din, had received threats on their Facebook pages during the filming of the film.
- The announcement of the film sparked angry reactions on social media, with user Mohamed Gad describing the film on his Twitter account as a "cinematic disaster" that encourages the spread of atheistic ideas.
- User Omar Al-Daqen said that the film is a good step on the road and that there should be other bold works that help raise awareness in our Arab societies.
- User Lamia Hatem believes on her account not to judge the film before watching it, saying: "It is possible that this film is awareness-raising. Dr. Mustafa Mahmoud published a book entitled Dialogue with My Atheist Friend, and it had nothing to do with atheism, but he was attacking atheism."
- Twitter user Amira Badawi says on her account: "Regardless of the content, it's good that the censorship approved a film so bold and there is more freedom for filmmakers."

=== Responses From The Production Team ===
During the interview, Mohamed Abdel Aziz, the protagonist of The Atheist, said that the film sounds the alarm towards this sect, and warns of their presence in society, pointing out that the title of the film caused us a lot of criticism, as the film promotes the idea, and this is not true.

As for the reactions that came out of some after the announcement of the film's release, Mohamed Hisham stressed that everyone attacks the work without waiting to watch it, as Islamists attack it thinking that the work calls for atheism, while atheists attack it and they believe that the work distorts their image, and the truth is that the work does not revolve in this framework, and depends only on opening a discussion between the far right and the far left.
