= Tamer Hussein =

- تامر حسين
- Born: 20 August 1984 (age 41); Cairo, Egypt
- Occupations: lyricist, composer
- Years active: 2007–present

Tamer Hussein (Arabic: تامر حسين; born 20 August 1984) is an Egyptian lyricist and composer, who has won several awards and honors as the best poet in Egypt. He has composed Egyptian-genre songs for numerous singers in the MENA region, including Amr Diab, Tamer Hosny, Elissa, Samira Said, Sherine Abdel Wahab, Husseini, Amal Maher, Mohamed Hamaki, Jannat, Nancy Ajram, Carole Samaha, Asala, Bahaa Sultan, Wael Jassar, Hani Shaker, and others. He also composed the score for the film "Al Molhed" (The Atheist) in 2014.

== Early life ==
Tamer Hussein started writing songs when he was a little child. He later studied at Ain Shams University in Cairo and graduated from the Faculty of Law in 2007. But since 2006, Tamer Hussein has begun working in the Arab world and the Middle East, especially Egypt, and created one of his earliest songwriting credits: the 2007 debut studio album Ayamy by the prominent composer and singer Amr Mostafa. by the presence from Amr Mostafa, Tamer was able to worked for a lot of super stars such as Amr Diab, Amr Mostafa, Samira Said, Hossam Habib, Mohammed Hamaky, Tamer Hosny, Sherine Abdel Wahab, Elissa, Hussein el Jasmy, Yassmen Ali and many more.

== Style and Composition ==
The theme of the music made by Tamer Hussein has colorful topics, which covered a wide spectrum from love songs to Patriotic songs called Taḥyā Maṣr, and the latter style may also suggest the political leaning of Tamer Hussein. For these songs, Tamer Hussein successfully combined traditional instruments and rhymes into pop music and created his style of fast and dynamic, which made Tamer Hussein a necessary part for the build up of Egyptian Pop music.

== Discography ==
- Ayamy (2007) Wrote (Ana Nsitek, Seeb El Waqt Yeady, Yady El Gheba, Ala Eidek, Baheb Fek, We Eh Yemna'a)
- Alama Fi Hyatak (2008) Wrote (Alama Fi Hyatak, Sraht Feek, Mansash, Za'alan Alek)
- Wayah (2009) Wrote (Wayah)
- Hassa Beek (2017 ) Wrote (Zabbat W Khattat)
- El Omr (2020) Wrote (Sukkar Zeyada)
- Hdoudi Sama (2009) Wrote (Ragaalak)
- Hob Gamed (2013) Wrote (El Bady Azlam)

== Awards ==
The poet Tamer Hussein won several awards as the best lyricist in Egypt, including:

- World Music Awards: Album (El Lila) with singer Amr Diab
- Arab poet four times on the album Best and Sweetest 2016, 2018, 2020 and 2021.
- Washwasha Award for Best Poet, Excellence Award 2018.
- Best Poet of the Year 2021, dear guest Festival.
- The most successful song of 2019 (Nasini Leh) by singer Tamer Hosny.
- The most successful song of 2018 (Yetalemo ) by singer Amr Diab from the album Kol Hayati.

== Controversy of the works ==
The movie "Al-Molhed" (Arabic: الملحد; The Atheist) in 2014, for which Tamer Hussein had composed the score, sparked media criticism and stirred controversy on social media. The dramatic narrative in the movie that explored the issues of religious extremism and atheism and their impact on youth were seen as a threat to Islamic religious values as well as Egyptian societal values. The release date of the movie was delayed due to one of the scenes that the censors objected to and asked to be modified, which made the producer modify the scene according to the desire of the censors to obtain permission to show. Eventually, the film was released under the banner "Adults Only", and several Egyptian cinemas refused to receive the film and show it inside them for fear of being exposed to the anger of protesters over its content.
