= Yehya Saade =

- Born: 18 May 1975; Beirut, Lebanon
- Died: 17 December 2010 (aged 35); Izmir, Turkiye
- Years active: 2006-2010
- Known for: Lebanese film director

Yehya Antoun Saade (alternately spelled "Yehia" and "Saadé;" 1975–2010) (Arabic: يحيى سعادة) was a Lebanese film director who specialized in music videos. He worked with numerous popular Arab artists and was known for his unorthodox approach to social taboos.

== Artistic career ==
=== Music videos ===
Among Saade's collaborators were the musical artists Nancy Ajram (e.g. for "Akhasmak Ah"), Amal Hijazi ("Baya3 El Ward"); Haifa Wehbe ("Ebn El Halal"), Karol Sakr ("Jirh Ghiyabak"), Nawal Al Zoghbi ("Mona Einah"), and Shadha Hassoun ("Wa'd Arqoub").

=== Critical reception ===
Saade has been described as an artist "who does not believe in sacred cows and who rebels against traditions, rejects intellectual, social, and political embargos."

The media scholar Marwan Kraidy has summarized Saade's artistic impact thus:

Known for breaking social taboos with semiotically effervescent and sexually provocative imagery, Saadé’s artistic trajectory moved from one controversy to another. While some of his critics accused him of 'naïve directness,' others said that he 'was provocative to the point of slapping the viewer in the face.' But the heart of the controversy lay in his videos’ depiction of 'an explosive femininity . . . bold . . . rebellious' (Elias 2009).

Saade died at the age of 35 after being electrocuted by a cable on the set of a music video being filmed in Turkey.
