= Batoul Arafa =

Egyptian film director

- بتول عرفة
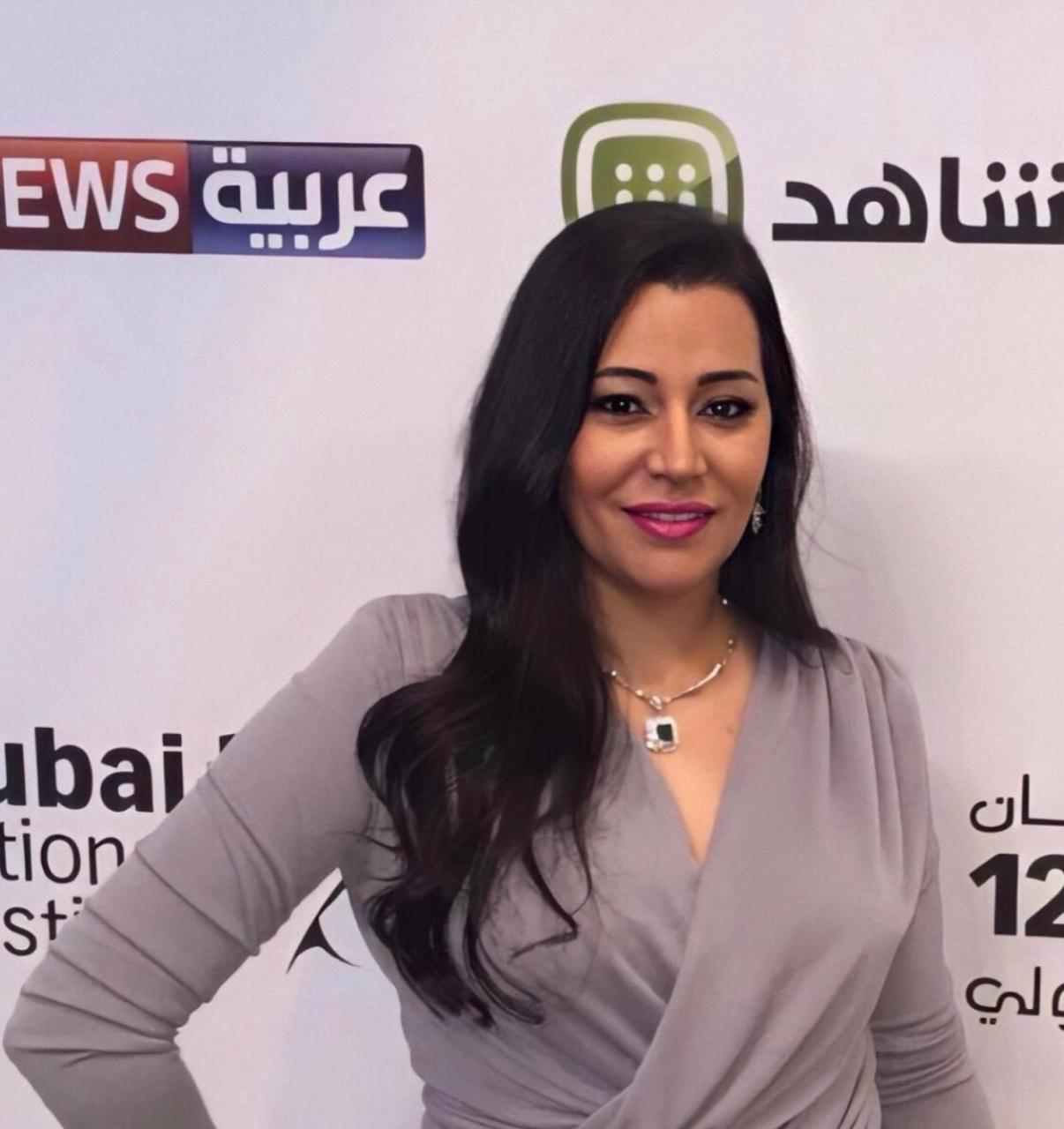
- Born: 16 November 1981 (age 44); Alexandria
- Education: Higher Institute of Dramatic Arts
- Occupation: Director
- Years active: 2005–present
- Known for: Ored Ragoln

Batoul Arafa (Arabic: بتول عرفة) (born November 16, 1981) is an Egyptian film director

== Biography ==
She graduated from the Mir de Dieu School in Alexandria, then joined the Higher Institute of Dramatic Arts and graduated from the Drama Department in 2005. Batoul directed a wide range of Television Drama and Theatre pieces of huge success, also directed many festivals both inside and outside of Egypt.

== Filmography ==
=== Series ===
- Ored Ragoln / (Arabic: أريد رجلًا)

=== Plays ===
- Chocolate Factory (Arabic : مصنع الشوكولاتة)
- Cinderella (Arabic : سندريلا)
- The Tempest (Arabic : العاصفة)
- Too late (Arabic : سوء تفاهم)
- The Just (Arabic : العادلون)

=== Video Clips ===
- El 3ar Series Song (Adam)
- Deny W Denak (Tamer Hosny)
- Fe Alb Masr (Essaf)
- ElNas El Ray'ah (Ramy Ayach & Adaweya)
- Tarekh Wy Hader (Mohamed Hassan & Rawan Eleyan)
- Habibi Ya Watan (Mohamed Fouad)
