= Betfakkar Fi Eih =

Betfakkar Fi Eih?! !بتفَكّر في ايه؟

Studio album by Nancy Ajram
- Released: July 30, 2008
- Recorded: 2007–2008
- Studio: ART (Cairo); Hot Spot (Cairo); Sout El Hob (Cairo); Hadi Sharara (Beirut)
- Genre: Arabic Pop; World; Ballad; Pop rock
- Length: 60:42
- Label: In2Musica
- Producer: Jiji Lamara (exec.); Nancy Ajram (exec.); Tarek Madkour; Hadi Sharara; Adel Ayesh; Hamid Al Shairi; Fahd; Hassan El Shafei; Tarek Aakef

Nancy Ajram chronology
Shakhbat Shakhabit (2007)	Betfakkar Fi Eih?! !بتفَكّر في ايه؟ (2008)	Nancy 7 (2010)

Singles from Betfakkar Fi Eih
- 1. "Meen Gheiry Ana" Released: February 08, 2008; 2. "Betfakkar Fi Eih" Released: July 19, 2008; 3. "Min Dally Nseek" Released: November 5, 2008; 4. "Lamset Eed" Released: February 27, 2009; 5. "Ibn El Giran" Released: May 19, 2009; 6. "Mashi Haddi" Released: August 2, 2009

Betfakkar Fi Eih (Arabic: بتفكر في إيه, English: What Are You Thinking About?) is the sixth studio album by Lebanese singer Nancy Ajram. It was released on July 30, 2008 in the Arab World, and August 1 of the same year elsewhere through In2Musica, to reach remarkable career-defining success that none of Ajram's previous records had achieved.

Betfakkar Fi Eih produced several successful and number-one singles. The lead single and title track was a change in the sound of Ajram welcomed by critics and fans. The album, just like its predecessor Ya Tabtab...Wa Dallaa also featured product placement as a tool to promote many of its songs, including "Meen Ghairy Ana," "Wana Ben Idek" and "Lamset Eed." The latter being an ad for Sony Ericson smartphones, with which Ajram made a deal upon dropping the album. Other singles include "Mashi Haddi," which became a big hit in the summer of 2009.

The album brought Ajram to global recognition, when she returned home from the 2008 World Music Awards with the trophy for the best selling Middle Eastern act. Ajram is the youngest Arabian act to score a WMA.

== Production and changes ==
In June 2008, Jiji announced the filming of a video for a song called "Aktar W Aktar" (Sahharny Sahhar) which was rumored to have been the old album title. However, "Betfakkar Fi Eih" then became the lead single and album title. "Biteegy Sirtak" was rumored to have been a 15-minute-long song, as mentioned by Samir Sfeir himself and Nancy Ajram, but the album version was edited down to 6 minutes for radio broadcast.

In January 2007, news about "Ibn El Giran" (The Neighbor's Son) had leaked and it was mentioned that Nadine Labaki was to film it as her music video comeback. She had reportedly met with music producer Hamid Al Shairi for suggestions that would match the music video. However, Nadine did not direct any music videos for three years ahead, and "Ibn El Giran" was later directed by British director, Mike Harris. Also, "Zaman Kan Andi Alb" (I Used to Have a Heart) is strongly rumored to be directed by Nadine Labaki, to supposedly sequel "Inta Eyh". However, in mid 2009 rumors had it that the song will be directed by Yehya Saade, preceded by the Khaliji song of the album, "Khaffef Alayya". This led to complaints from fans, first due to the choice of Yehya as a director, especially after the release of several controversial clips by him. The choice of "Khaffef" was also not well-received, since this song did not catch as much attention as Nancy's previous Khaliji hit "Mishtaga Leik". Zaman Kan Andi Alb's music video still remains in question. The song is the second creation of Samir Sfeir and Tarek Madkoor in the album, after "Meen Ghayri Ana" which fans highly requested a music video for. Due to all these reasons, Nancy decided in November 2009 to cancel filming "Khaffef" and to film "Meen Ghayri Ana" instead, thus satisfying huge fan demand cleverly, keeping Yehya as the director of the clip. However, later on, fans were surprised to see that none of the songs mentioned were filmed as music videos, in spite of official statements with set filming dates and crew.

== Artwork ==
A promotional picture from the Betfakkar Fi Eih photoshoot showing Ajram sitting at the back of a car.

The album includes two different photoshoots by David Abdallah, whom Ajram constantly works with. As opposed to her previous typical-photoshoot album covers which did not achieve satisfaction, this album's was generally Ajram's most liked cover by the public. The cover shoot showed Ajram sitting at the back of a car, staring mysteriously outside the window, or simply with her eyes closed, appearing to be deep in thought and imagination. The cover came to match the album's theme of change and maturity, as it serves to impose the question of the album title, "Betfakkar Fi Eih" (What Are You Thinking About?). In the other shoot included in the inlay booklet, Ajram poses in common photoshoot style, with rose petals flying all around her. The three different looks in the shoots and the three different hairstyles in the car shoot were the work of her make-up artist, Fady Kataya, and hairdresser, Wassim Morkos from Pace e Luce, respectively. The artwork was designed by Lebanese artist Georges Yucef, who have previously designed Ah W Noss and Ya Tabtab...Wa Dallaa album covers. The album booklet contains full Arabic lyrics to the songs.

== Musical composition ==
"Betfakkar Fi Eih"
The album's lead single and title track, features a "pop rock" style and a backing track with "electric guitar".

"Wana Ben Ideik (Akbar Men Keda)"
Romantic rock power ballad track which shows Ajram's deep convincing feelings towards her lover.

Ajram chose the album title track "Betfakkar Fi Eih" (What Are You Thinking About?) because its meaning described the change in the album. The first preview of the album was from the hit "Meen Ghairy Ana" in Ajram's three part Coke commercial, which served as a very successful promotion 5 months before release. Even though "Meen Ghairy Ana" is considered by many to be the smash hit of the album, the choice of the lead single was to be the album title track as usual, which did not satisfy all critics. Along with the album's release came a high budget video for "Betfakkar Fi Eih" with hi-tech effects that marked a first in the Arab world.

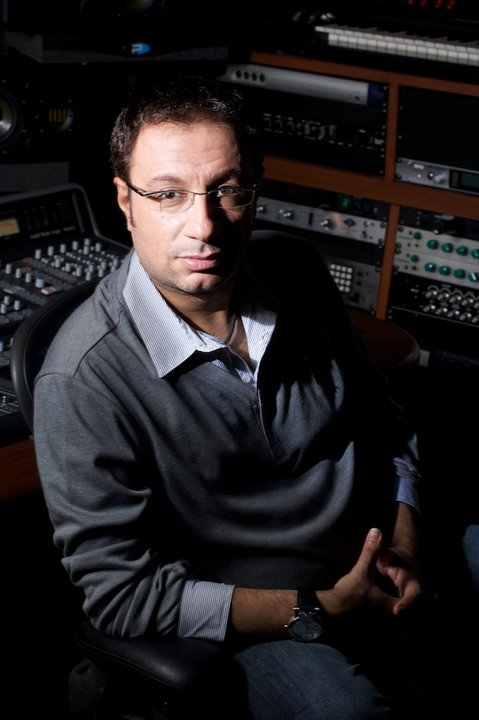
Tarek Madkour, produced three tracks in the album including the title track.

Ajram, before the album's release was rumored to have already filmed "Meen Ghairy Ana" and "Ibn El Giran". "Meen Ghairy Ana", by the successful trio, Nizar Francis, Samir Sfeir and Tarek Madkour who previously created Ajram's smash hits "Yay" and "Ana Yalli", is an upbeat romantic song which was used for the 2008 Coca-Cola campaign in the Middle East. In the song, Madkour's brand new Western formula of beats and instruments created a unique and "colorful" style for Ajram; a much richer mix than the simple, yet unique electric guitar he included in the album's hit "Betfakkar Fi Eih", from which the video's whole style was inspired. Ajram also continues her drama of "Inta Eyh" from Ah W Noss with a sequel in this album. In "Zaman Kan Andi Alb" (I Used to Have a Heart), the sad heartbroken wife who once made sure to be smiling to her cheating husband has a change of heart, or more accurately a loss of one. In the song, Ajram faces him with the truth she was hiding in the old song and video and announces that she no longer has a heart like before to love him. The song is also by Samir Sfeir and Tarek Madkoor, who this time chose to create a simpler mix to the song that focuses on Sfeir's tune and shows a wide vocal range for Ajram.

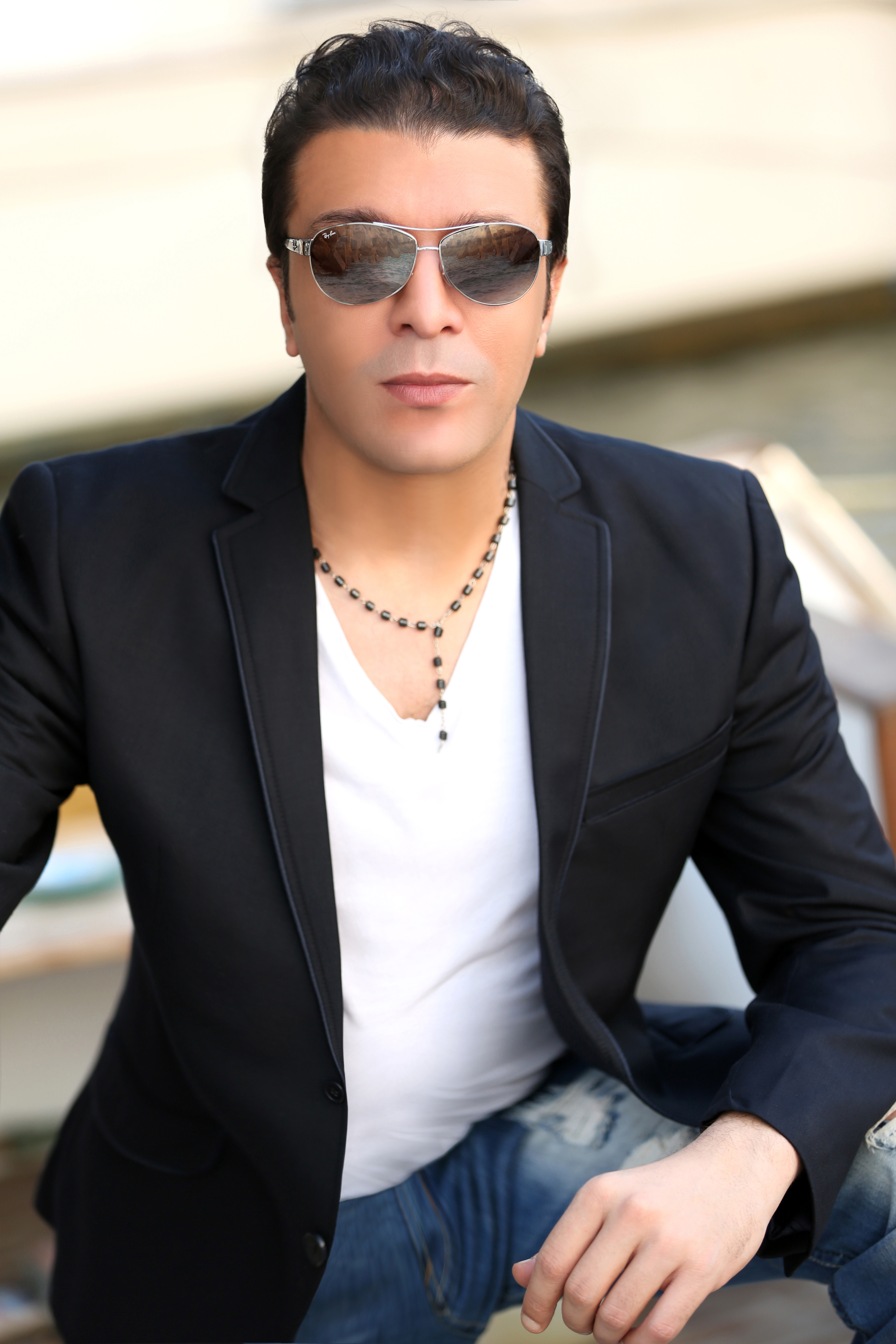
Egyptian singer and songwriter Mustafa Kamel, wrote "Biteegy Sirtak".

The most successful song in radio stations upon release of the album is most probably "Lamset Eed" (Touch of a Hand), a very romantic song with deep, sad feelings. The song, by the same trio, Fares Iskandar, Salim Salama and Hadi Sharara, who created Ajram's previous hit "Ehsas Jdeed", shows a maturity in her style and a convincing singing of feelings. In "Min Dally Nseek", the second video of the album, Ajram contributed in forming a first-time collaboration between Egyptian composer Walid Saad and Lebanese music producer Hadi Sharara who created a fast, different and new mix for the song for which he praised Ajram for making a "brave" choice. Another romantic rock power ballad song is "Wana Ben Ideik" which shows Ajram's deep convincing feelings towards her lover. This is Ajram's second cooperation with Egyptian composer Mahmoud Khayami after "Baddallaa' Aleik" in Ah W Noss. In "Mashi Haddi", Ajram returns to Lebanese folklore last seen in her 2001 album Sheel Oyoonak Anni, but this time with a fast oldies style that takes a great credit for the album's uniqueness. Ajram also sings an old Egyptian style in "Ibn El Giran" where she performs a short "Mawwal" at the end of the song for the first time since "Baddalla' Aleik" in Ah W Noss. Another fast Egyptian song by Mohammed Rahim is "Sahharny Sahhar" which was rumored to have been the old title of the album. Probably the most remarkable feature of this song is that it is a Tarab song by Samir Sfeir "Biteegy Sirtak". Ajram who always performs Tarab for other singers in her concerts finally included her own track after the 1998 tracks of her debut album Mihtagalak. The song, which was originally 15 minutes long had to be edited down to 6 minutes for radio stations to be able to play it all.

=== Genre ===
In Betfakkar Fi Eih, Ajram performed the widest variety of styles in comparison with her previous albums, many of which were completely new to her. To categorize the most significant:

- Pop: "Betfakkar Fi Eih", "Meen Ghayri Ana", "Min Dally Nseek"
- Egyptian/Bellydance/Maksoum: "Sahharny Sahhar", "Baladiyyat", "Ibn El Giran"
- Ballad: "Wana Ben Ideik", "Zaman Kan Andi Alb", "Lamset Eed", "Leya Haq"
- Khaliji (Gulf): "Khaffef Alayya"
- Tarab/Modern Tarab: "Biteegy Sirtak", "Safer"
- Oldies Pop: "Mashi Haddi" (80's Lebanese pop), "Ibn El Giran" (includes short "Mawwal")

== Singles ==
=== Promotional Singles ===
- "Meen Ghairy Ana (Nos El Kawn)" - 3 Coca-Cola Commercials (instrumental version, a cappella version, album version)

Director: Manfredo Leteo

- "Ibn El Giran" - Damas Jewellery (Farfasha)/World Gold Council

Director: Mike Harris

- "Wana Ben Ideik" and Betfakkar Fi Eih" - 3 Sony Ericsson Commercials

Director: Leila Kanaan

=== Music Videos ===
- The title track and lead single "Betfakkar Fi Eih" was released on July 19, 2008. The music video was directed by Said El Marouk and released simultaneously with the album release on July 30.
- "Min Dally Nseek" was released as the second single on November 5, 2008. Its music video was directed also by Said El Marouk.
- "Lamset Eed" was released as the third single February 27, 2009. Ajram filmed its music video with Leila Kanaan as the first collaboration with her.
- "Ibn El Giran" was released during Ajram's pregnancy while the video was filmed to sequence her Damas Farfasha campaign filmed earlier. Music video directed by Mike Harris.
- "Mashi Haddi" was the final single which was released on August 2, 2009, even though "Zaman Kan Andi Alb" was scheduled for release later on.

=== Other charted songs ===
- "Meen Ghairy Ana" was delivered through a series of three Coke commercials in March 2008 as part of the official Middle East Coca-Cola song of the year. Alternatively known as "Noss el Kawn", the song topped several charts and served as a successful promotion for the album's official release. "Meen Ghairy Ana" has been sampled by several artists and translated into Hebrew and Persian.
- "Wana Ben Ideik" was released as a promotional single, it was used in commercials for Sony Ericsson in which Nancy was the new spokesperson for, the commercial was directed by Leila Kanaan. The song received remarkable attention globally and was remixed by several international DJ's including Space Cowboy.
- "Sahharny Sahhar", rumored to have been scheduled as the lead single, charted at #56 on Radio Panorama FM even though never released as a single. Nancy later performed the song on the final episode of "The Manager".
- "Zaman Kan Andi Alb" was scheduled to be released as the final single from the album, but this project had been cancelled due to several reasons, mainly Nancy's pregnancy. It was announced to be a sequel to Nancy's previous smash hit "Inta Eyh", and charted on several radio stations.
- "Baladiyyat" charted on several stations and was promoted on TV as a live performance.
- "Biteegy Sertak" was a radio hit. Many stations considered it a new, unique move in Nancy's career. A video of a live performance of the song was played by many TV channels.

== Track listing ==
Standard edition

No.	Title	Lyrics	Music	Producer	Length
1.	"Betfakkar Fe Eih" (What Are You Thinking About)	Amir Teima	Mohammed El Nadi	Tarek Madkour	3:55
2.	"Min Dally Nseek" (Who's Forgotten About You)	Mehad Gouda	Walid Saad	Hadi Sharara	3:42
3.	"Meen Ghairy Ana (Noss El Kawn)" (Who Else But Me (Half The Universe))	Nizar Francis	Samir Sfeir	Tarek Madkour	4:06
4.	"Safer (Ana Rohy Maak)" (Leave, My Soul's within You)	Awad Badawi	Walid Saad	Adel Ayesh	5:01
5.	"Sahharny Sahhar" (Keep Me Up, Keep Me Up)	Khaled Amin	Mohammed Rahim	Hamid Al Shairi	3:52
6.	"Baldiyyat (Ana Menno)" (From My Town)	Nader Abdallah	Walid Saad	Adel Ayesh	4:29
7.	"Zaman Kan Andi Alb" (I Used To Have a Heart)	Amir Teima	Samir Sfeir	Tarek Madkour	5:08
8.	"Lamset Eed" (Touch of a Hand)	Fares Iskandar	Salim Salameh	Hadi Sharara	3:55
9.	"Leya Haq" (I Have the Right)	Mustafa Moursi	Samir Sfeir	Fahd	4:00
10.	"Ibn El Giran" (The Neighbours' Son)	Khaled Amin	Mohammed Rahim	Hamid Al Shairi	4:27
11.	"Wana Ben Ideik (Akbar Men Keda)" (When I'm in Your Arms (Bigger Than That))	Mohammed El Bogha	Mahmoud Khayami	Hassan El Shafei	3:30
12.	"Khaffef Alayya" (Ease It Up on Me)	El Nasser	Abdulrab Idris	Tarek Aakef	3:57
13.	"Mashi Haddi" (Walking Next To Me)	Fares Iskandar	Salim Salameh	Hamid Al Shairi	4:18
14.	"Biteegy Sirtak" (You Get Mentioned)	Mustafa Kamel	Samir Sfeir	Tarek Aakef	6:16
Total length:					60:42

== Tour ==
The album was widely promoted by Nancy's 2008 world tour. The tour became Nancy's first to feature legs outside the Arab World.

Setlist

- "Betfakkar Fi Eih"
- "Mashy Haddi"
- "Min Dally Nseek"
- "Wana Ben Idek"
- "Baladiyyat"
- "Ibn El Giran"
- "Ya Salam"
- "Yay"
- "Ah W Noss"
- "Waving Flag" (Added later to the 2010 shows)
- "Meen Ghairy Ana"

== Reception ==
Betfakkar Fi Eih is considered one of Nancy's most successful albums to date as it won her first World Music Award after seven albums. Betfakkar Fi Eih was the most selling album in the Arab world (Middle East and North Africa) for the year 2008, even though there were huge competitors at that same year including Nawal Al Zoghbi, Elissa, Ragheb Alama, Tamer Hosny, Samira Said, Marwan Khoury, Myriam Fares, Haifa Wehbe, Mohamed Hamaki, Amal Hijazi, all of whom released comeback albums in the same year. In addition to the WMA, another award the album won was the Student's Choice Award based on a voting survey carried between over 8,000 Lebanese college students who voted it as album of the year.

Betfakkar Fi Eih peaked at #1 for 7 consecutive weeks in Beirut Virgin Megastores, and still continues to top charts around the Arab world, occupying #1 in Weekly Sales Charts numerous times in Beirut, Dubai, Egypt, Syria & Jordan, and online sources. In the lead hit video, prominent director Said El Marouk was thoroughly criticized for focusing on high-level effects and styles rather than a coherent storyboard for the clip. However, Betfakkar Fi Eih was nevertheless voted #2 for the best video of 2008 in an online survey by Stars Cafe. Min Dally Nseek on the other hand, which came three months later and also by Saeed, peaked at #1 for seven consecutive weeks in Melody Hits Top Music Videos and Top Songs.

Two months upon release, many then-unfilmed songs achieved huge success among the public and acquired "smash-hit status", including the album's promo song 5 months pre-release, "Meen Ghayri Ana", as well as the instant radio-hits "Lamset Eed", "Mashi Haddi", "Wana Bin Idek", "Sahharny Sahhar", and the first two singles, "Betfakkar Fi Eih" and "Min Dally Nseek". Due to huge amount of video requests for different songs, Nancy announced that she will be filming about 10 music videos from the 14 songs of the album.

Betfakkar Fi Eih broke the record in HitMarker's Top 10 best-selling Arabic album charts by remaining for 54 consecutive weeks in the list since the date of its release. The album's singles and music videos, including the title track, have all reached #1 spots at Hitmarker, the only official pan-Arab music charts that are the trusted source for the WMA's.

== Personnel ==
- Samir Sfeir: four songs (most composer with songs on the album). Previous songs for Ajram: "Ana Yalli", "Inta Eih", "Gayyin Ye2ulouli", "La Teloom" from her hit album Ah W Noss, and "Yey (Sehr 3youno)" from Ya Salam.
- Tarek Madkour: who arranged 3 songs in the album. Madkour has previously composed and arranged Ajram's famous hit songs "Ah W Noss" & "Ya Tabtab", and has arranged: "Yay", "Inta Eih", "Oul Tani Keda", "Ana Yalli", and many others.
- Salim Salameh: composed two hits in the album, Lamset Eed and Mashi Haddi. Salameh previously composed Ajram's smash hit "Ehsas Jdeed" and her first best selling album's title "Ya Salam", with "Ahla Jaw" and "Nasseito Garho".
- Hamid Al Shairi: cooperated with Ajram for the first time in three songs, "Mashi Haddi", "Ibn El Giran" and "Sahharny Sahhar", notably adding a brand new oldies touch to her music.
- Walid Saad: composed 3 songs in the album, "Min Dally Nseek", "Safer" and "Baladiyyat". Saad previously composed "Elli Kan", "Moegaba", "Hobbak Leyya" and "Ana Masri", Ajram's song for Egypt.
- Hadi Sharara: has previously arranged "Ehsas Jdeed" for Ajram, with two songs in this album "Min Dally Nseek" and "Lamset Eed".
- Mahmoud Al Khiyami: previously did "Baddallaa' Aleik" for Ajram and is considered from Egypt's top composers, composed a slow song for her in this album called "Wana Ben Ideik".
- Mohammed Rahim: composed two songs in the album "Sahharny Sahhar" and "Ibn El Giran". Rahim previously composed Ajram's smash Coca-Cola hit "El Dounya Helwa" and "Ana Leih" from her album Ah W Noss.
- AbdulRab Idris: a singer and composer, composed "Khaffef Alayya" (the only Khaliji song in the album) which was written by the great poet AlNasser.

Background vocals: Ajram did the background vocals for all of the songs of the album except Tracks #2, #6, #8, #9, #12 and #14.
