= Resala Charity Organization =

Egyptian non-profit organization

Resala Charitable Organization جمعية رسالة للأعمال الخيرية
- Founded: 1999; 27 years ago
- Type: Non-profit
- Location: Cairo
- Website: resala.org

Resala, also known as Resala Association, is a non-profit organization based in Egypt.

== History and profile ==
Resala was established in 1999 as a youth movement at Cairo University; Sherif Abd Al Azim, an engineering professor, supervised the movement.

It is powered by over 1,500,000 volunteers spanning 67 branches all over Egypt. It provides 31 activities aimed at helping the Egyptian community. These activities include: caring for orphans; helping the blind, the deaf, and children with special needs; blood donations; poverty alleviation; and literacy training.

== Activities ==
- Orphans care: Each branch raises around 25 orphans or less, providing them with care and big siblings through the BBBS activity, with the possibility of being adopted.
- Blind care: In addition to helping thousands of blind people in need, many books are being printed in Braille, recorded in cassettes and read to the orphans by thousands of volunteers. Through Resala, many of them have received their Master's degree and PHDs.
- Deaf/mutes care: Provides them with computer courses, religious principles, art workshops, medical aids and job opportunities; also organises trips and parties.
- Special abilities care
- Aiding needy homes and families
- Organizing second-hand clothes fairs
- Free tutoring
- Blood bank or life-saving activity aims to spread blood donation culture in Egypt with 50K on call emergency donor and regular organized blood donation campaigns supplying safe blood transfusion to different patients especially the Thalassemia group which is covered by constant and regular “kafala” donors for their case.
- Recycling
- Training centers (literacy/computers/languages)
- Medical care
- Street kids care
- Caravans
- Charity errands
- Charity visits
- Handiwork
- Advertising
- Sales
- Anwar Resala
- Forsan Resala
- Ensan Awareness
