= Yuri Mraqqadi =

Lebanese singer

Yuri Mrakadi يوري مرقدي
- Born: Beirut, Lebanon
- Occupation: Artist
- Years active: 2001–present

Yuri Mrakadi Arabic: يوري مرقّدي; is a Lebanese Artist (Writer, composer, music producer & actor) He is also a veteran in the advertising field in the MENA as an Executive Creative Director

== Career ==
He became famous after his hit single "Arabiyyon ana" (Arabic: عربىٌ أنا, lit. 'an Arab I am') which jump-started his musical career. His follow-up song "Al-Mar'a al-Arabiyyah" (Arabic: المرأه العربية, lit. 'the Arabic woman') had a similar pan-Arab success. Between 2001 and 2005, Yuri released four studio albums. After a period of hiatus, he has returned for new materials of his own composition starting 2011, and is preparing a new album.

Yuri co-starred with the Egyptian actress Hanan Tork in the film Al Hayah Montaha Al Lazzah in 2005. In 2018, he had the main role in the soap opera, Majnoune Fiki.

== Personal life ==
Yuri is married to Olfat Mounzer, he has 2 daughters from his previous marriage

== Discography ==
=== Albums ===
- 2001: Arabiyyon ana (Arabic: عربىٌ أنا, lit. 'an Arab I am')
- 2003: Habs el Nisaa (Arabic: حبس النساء, lit. 'the women's prison')
- 2004: Bahebk Moot (Arabic: بحبك موت, lit. 'I love you to death')
- 2005: Ya Aasi (Arabic: يا قاسي, lit. 'oh harsh one')

== Videography ==
- "Shiftee Wsiltee"
- "Bahibbak Mot"
- "Hada Mosh Ana"
- "Ansak"
- "Arabiyyon Ana"
- "Maza Aqool"
- "Khateera Antee"
- "Al-Mar'a al-Arabiyyah"
- "Allimeeni"
