= Nancy 7 =

Studio album by Nancy Ajram
- Released: September 6, 2010
- Recorded: 2009–2010
- Studios: Various: M. Sound 1 (Cairo); Audio Vision (Beirut); Al Risala (Cairo); ART (Cairo); Leila (Cairo); Hadi Sharara (Beirut); TK (Cairo); Karim Abdel Wahab (Cairo); Solo Bahrain/Al Takamul (Manama)
- Genres: Arabic Pop; World; R&B; Techno; Ballad; Soft rock; Dance
- Length: 60:06
- Label: In2Musica
- Producers: Various: Jiji Lamara (exec.); Nancy Ajram (exec.); Tamim; Bassem Rizk; Tooma; Osama El Hendy; Mohammed Mustafa; Hadi Sharara; Tarek Madkour; Ahmed Ibrahim; Kareem Abdel Wahab; Hisham Al Sakran

Nancy Ajram chronology
Betfakkar Fi Eih (2008)	Nancy 7 (2010)	Super Nancy (2012)

Singles from Nancy 7
- 1. "Fi Hagat" Released: September 4, 2010; 2. "Sheikh El Shabab" Released: December 23, 2010; 3. "Ya Kether" Released: May 13, 2011; 4. "Meen El Ma Ando" Released: October 31, 2011

Nancy 7 is the seventh studio album by Lebanese singer Nancy Ajram. It was released on September 6, 2010, by In2Musica to wide commercial and critical success, to follow the footsteps of Ajram's previous sets. The album explores a new set of sounds and genres including dance, techno and R&B on one hand, but still keeps the musical style that Nancy had created over the years, that is the Egyptian and Lebanese dance-folk sound, on the other. The latter has given Nancy her biggest hits ever, including "Ah W Noss", "Ya Tabtab" and "Lawn Oyounak."

Critics gave 7 largely positive reviews, favoring its shift to more modern and global sounds, and its ability to join these sounds with local music and 90's Arabian themes. Lyrically, the record speaks of love, admiration, heartbreak and relationships, subjects that Nancy had spoken about in previous sets. In addition, other songs extend to deeper meanings about life, childhood and family.

The lead single, "Fi Hagat", is her first ballad to be delivered as a leading promotional track. It peaked atop multiple Arabian charts, most significantly HitMarker, where it occupied the apex for 15 consecutive weeks, the longest run on the number one in the history of the chart. With the second single, "Sheikh El Shabab," the album continued to break records when the song debuted atop the chart, replacing the first single. The feat was never reached before. The album's third single was "Ya Kether", the fourth and final single was "Meen El Ma Ando".

== Development and release ==
Ajram gave the first preview of the album during Neshan's show " IL Maestro" in Ramadan 2009, when she sang parts of two songs, "Sallemouly Aleih" and "Sheikh El Shabab". The former was excluded from the album, and was released as a single at the 2010 New Year's Eve, and achieved huge success among Arab radio stations. This was Nancy's first cooperation with Egyptian producer Tamim, who did the arrangements for three songs of the album. Nancy then announced she will be singing a song that refers to her relationship to her parents and child, "Hkayat El Deni" (Stories of Life), previously named "Ghafwet Eini". News of "Bayyaa' We Shater" was also announced beforehand, as it was previously known as "Assly". The album was rumored to have been titled "Bel Hadawa" which was to be album's lead single. However, the song leaked unofficially several months before release and the lead single had changed. In her appearance on "Khaleek Bel Beit" with Zahi Wehbi, Nancy explained:

My album will include many new changes. There will be a shift to more serious songs in terms of lyrical content, as well generally calmer music with both modern and traditional sounds. However, I will remain true to my same identity for which my fans like my music most, which is fast, upbeat songs.

Initially, the album titled was rumored to have changed from "Bel Hadawa" (which leaked months before release) to "Einy Aleik". A few weeks before release, however, it was announced that the final decided album title was "7", marking Nancy's seventh studio album in her career.

The album was initially scheduled for release by early summer of 2010, but due to the occurrence of the 2010 FIFA World Cup, for which Nancy recorded the official Middle East song, as well the Islamic Holy Month of Ramadan, it was delayed until early September. The final release date was announced to be September 6, and six songs were distributed to pan-Arab local stations to promote the album, as well a teaser ad on her official Facebook. Ajram promoted the album majorly online, via her official website and Facebook fan page, which is the biggest Arabic fan page on the site. The whole album, however, leaked on the internet and become available for download on dozens of forums on September 2, and the company accidentally announced the release of the album on that day.

== Composition and musical styles ==
"Fi Hagat"
The album's lead single, a sad song about the feelings of an unappreciated lover.

"Kol Ma Tiddi"
Samples Cher's The Music's No Good Without You.

"Meen El Ma Ando"
Influenced by the 70's Western disco music, which is a brand new style for Ajram.

Tarek Madkour arranged four tracks in this album of Egyptian Maksoum genre, deviating from his rock/soft rock productions in Ajram's previous album. "Bayyaa' We Shater" is considered the album's best continuation of Ajram's signature maksoum style in previous singles such as "Moegaba" and "Ashtiki Minno". The composer, Mahmoud Khayami, succeeded at presenting this style to Ajram which was completely different from the soft ballad single "Wana Ben Ideik" in her previous album. "Belhadawa", Madkour's second song in the album, is more traditional and 80's influenced from Egypt. The song, which is viewed stronger on the lyrical side, received less positive reviews than "Bayaa We Shater" did.

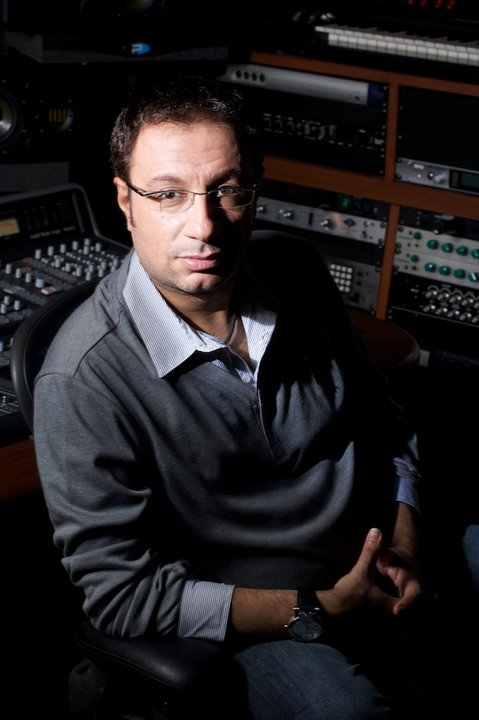
Tarek Madkour, produced four tracks in the album.

This is the first best-seller for Ajram that does not include a cooperation between Samir Sfeir and Tarek Madkour. Sfeir presented three songs in this album, each of which marks a special feature of the album. "Meen El Ma Ando" is influenced by the 70's Western disco music, which is a brand new style for Ajram. The song talks about the importance of elements of love and youth in one's life. "Ya Kethr" is Ajram's second Khaliji-dialect song by Sfeir after "La Teloom" in Ah W Noss. Before the release, Ajram explained that she has her bets on this song to be a big Khaliji hit, and it indeed received the most positive reviews from critics since her Khaliji hit "Mishtaga Leik" in 2006. Sfeir's final song, "Hkayat El Deni", is ballad that deviates away in topic from the previous love songs of the album. In this touching song, Ajram explains, the lyrics refer to her relationship to her parents and how much more she appreciates their efforts towards her now that she became a mother herself.

Mohammed Rahim also composed three songs in this album. "Fi Hagat" was selected as the lead single, and is a sad song about the feelings of an unappreciated lover. Rahim also presented two Egyptian songs of the lighter, simpler context, "Okay" and "Einy Aleik" which was rumored to have been the old album title. Both these songs show Ajram exploring deeper into contemporary Egyptian music. Walid Saad presented Ajram with three songs initially, one of which "Sallemouly Aleih" was excluded from the album and released as single months ahead. His song "Emta Hashoufak" presents a brand new style to Ajram reminiscent of sad Latin ballads. "Kol Ma Teddi" samples Cher's The Music's No Good Without You.

"Sheikh El Shabab" was a fan favorite even before the album's release, as Ajram sang part of it in a TV show. The interviewer, Nechan, had previously recorded his voice on the track's beginning to present it, but the idea had been called off later on. "Sheikh El Shabab" is composed by Salim Salama, and continues Ajram's Lebanese pop genre previously presented by Salama in "Mashi Haddi" and "Ehsas Jdeed", which are from Ajram's big hits.

== Promotion ==
Pre-release promotional campaigns for 7 were huge; billboards featuring the album cover filled the streets of Lebanese and Egyptian cities in late August 2010. TV channels showed a 16-second preview of the music video of "Fi Hagat," which was previously added to Nancy's official Facebook page. The latter has also been a promotional tool, posting updates and news about the then-upcoming seventh album.

=== Tour ===
To promote the album, Nancy went on an Arabian leg of her 2011 tour and was featured at multiple shows. She planned to embark a world tour to support the album in the summer, but her pregnancy with her second child caused the cancellation of many tour dates and shows.

=== Setlist ===
- "Bel Hadawa" – Sep. 2010
- "Sheikh El Shabab" – Sep. 2010
- "Bayyaa' We Shater" – Oct. 2010
- "Fi Hagat" – Oct. 2010
- "T'akhart Shway" – Nov. 2010
- "Meen El Ma Ando" – Jan. 2011
- "Ya Kether" – Aug. 2011
- "Einy Aleik" – Aug. 2009

== Singles ==
The album's singles are noticeably different in style from all of Ajram's previous single releases. Ajram also held a poll on her official Facebook page for the fans to vote for their favorite songs on 7 in order to select the ones that will be released as singles.

- "Fi Hagat" was chosen as the album's lead single. The music video was directed by Nadine Labaki, as a comeback after a 4-year absence. The music video sequels Ajram & Nadine's big hit "Lawn Ouyounak" where Ajram hides her feelings of being under-appreciated. The video was previewed on Ajram's official Facebook page, as a 16-second sneak peek before release. The song was later delivered to radio and was released digitally. The video premiered on September 4, 2010, on Arabica TV and MTV Lebanon.
- "Sheikh El Shabab" was lined up as the album's second single on December 23, 2010. Its music video was directed by Leila Kanaan becoming her fourth collaboration with Ajram. Contrary to the lead single, "Sheikh El Shabab" has a comical music video which her manager described as "the best music video we've shot yet". The song scored notable success prior its official release and reached No. 2 on Ajram's Facebook poll for fans' favorite songs on 7.
- "Ya Kether" was confirmed to be the third single from the album on Ajram's official Facebook page, where pictures from the set of the video were posted. The pictures show Ajram with her daughter who she brought on set, marking her first public appearance ever to the media. However, the single was officially released on May 13, 2011.
- "Meen El Ma Ando" was confirmed by Ajram as the fourth single from 7 right after her Eid concert in Casino Du Liban. It was used as a promotional single for the next DAMAS Farfasha campaign which was officially released on October 31, 2011. Even though "Einy Aleik" had scored higher in the Facebook poll on her official page, reports explain that Ajram does not intend on releasing any Egyptian dialect singles in the meantime, until the time is appropriate in Egypt. An official music video was supposed to be filmed in March 2012 but it was delayed and later scrapped entirely due to bad weather conditions at the time.

== Track listing ==
Standard edition

No.	Title	Lyrics	Music	Producer	Length
1.	"Einy Aleik" (You Took My Heart)	Ikram El Assi	Mohammed Rahim	Tamim	4:28
2.	"T'akhart Shway" (I'm Late)	Marcel Mdawar	Yehia El Hassan	Bassem Rizk	4:20
3.	"Eih Akhbar Nafseyyeto" (Tell Me About His Character)	Ayman Bahgat Amar	Walid Saad	Tooma	3:36
4.	"Emta Hashofak" (When Will We Meet)	Dr. Nabil Khalaf	Walid Saad	Osama El Hendy	3:57
5.	"Ya Kether" (So Much)	Abdulaziz Al Mays	Samir Sfeir	Mohammed Mustafa	5:09
6.	"Okay"	Mohammed Gomaa	Mohammed Rahim	Tamim	3:27
7.	"Fi Hagat" (Feelings)	Ahmed Marzouk	Mohammed Rahim	Hadi Sharara	4:26
8.	"Lessa Gayya A'ollo" (I Wanted to Tell Him)	Amir Teima	Mohammed El Nady	Tarek Madkour	4:07
9.	"Bel Hadawa" (Slowly)	Ayman Bahgat Amar	Mohammed Yehia	Tarek Madkour	4:09
10.	"Meen El Ma Ando" (Dearest One)	Nizar Francis	Samir Sfeir	Ahmed Ibrahim	4:15
11.	"Eih Elli Garaly" (What's Wrong with Me)	Amir Teima	Mohammed El Nady	Tarek Madkour	4:23
12.	"Kol Ma Tiddi" (You Shall Give)	Mohammed Refai	Mohammed Refai	Kareem Abdel Wahab	4:42
13.	"As'aad Allah Masak" (Good Evening)	Prince Mohammed Al; Abdullah Al Faisal	Saleh Al Shahri	Hisham Al Sakran	3:36
14.	"Sheikh El Shabab" (Casanova)	Fares Iskandar	Salim Salameh	Hadi Sharara	3:21
15.	"Bayyaa' We Shater (Assly)" (Genuine)	Hani Al Sagheer	Mahmoud Khayami	Tarek Madkour	4:21
16.	"Hkayat El Deni" (Life Stories)	Nizar Francis	Samir Sfeir	Ahmed Ibrahim	4:28
Total length:					60:06

== Personnel ==
Adapted from the album liner notes.

- Mostafa Aslan – guitar (tracks 1,2,6,10,16)
- Ahmed Ayadi – tabla (tracks 1,6,9,11,15); daf (Ayadi's band) (track 9)
- Hisham El Arabi – riq (tracks 1,6,9,11,15)
- Farouk Mohammed Hasan – accordion (tracks 1,2,6,9)
- Reda Bedair – ney (tracks 1,2,6,11)
- Anwar Abu Hassan – guitar (track 2)
- Mahmoud Souror – rebab (track 2)
- Ali Shaker – buzuq (track 2)
- Tamer Ghonim – strings conducting (track 2)
- Raymond El Hajj – percussion (track 2)
- Maged Souror – qanun (tracks 6,11)
- Mohammed Sakr – strings writing (tracks 8,9,11,15)
- Yehia EL Mougy – strings conducting (tracks 8,9,11,15); violin (track 15)
- Ahmed Ragab – bass (tracks 8,9,10,11,15,16)
- Amr Tantawy – guitar (tracks 8,9,11,15)
- Diaa Bader – percussion (track 10)
- Rami Samir – drums (track 16)
- Waheed – buzuq (track 16)
- Roger Moukarzel – photography
- Tony Haddad – digital mastering
- Georges Yucef – graphic design

== Reception ==
=== Critical ===
Early responses for the album favored its variety of genres and themes. Critics also welcomed the traditional vibe that Nancy has maintained since 2003 and still maintains to date, but still explores new musical styles and subjects.

Both the album and lead single, "Fi Hagat", debuted at number 1 at the Hitmarker charts upon release. The album has received widely positive reviews across the media and internet, and was previewed three days prior to release on the popular Arabic music site Funky Pharaoh, blogger and head DJ Man De Lev discussed the album's various songs in great detail and praised Nancy for her beautiful mix of styles in the album. He also highlighted Mohammed Rahim to be the star composer of the Album and Tamim to be the star arranger. The album was given an overall rating of 4 out of 5.

In an interview with Laha Magazine, several music critics gave the album positive reviews saying it's quite different than her previous albums and it didn't succeed by chance. Others stated that the album is perfect, in which multiple ideas addressed many aspects of life and is an artistic maturity which satisfies different tastes.

Professional ratings
Review scores
Source	Rating
Tarab	4.5/5 stars
Rotana	B+
Melody Arabia	5/5 stars
Jaras	5/5 stars
Dream	9/10 stars
EMI Arabia	A+
Virgin	(positive)

=== Chart performance ===
7 debuted atop the Virgin Megastores physical sales chart in more than 5 Arab regions, including Lebanon, where it occupied the apex for six consecutive weeks and became one of the best-selling albums of 2010.

The success of the album exceeded the Arab world, since it took first places in Virgin Megastore Paris, France. The album spent eight consecutive weeks atop the Virgin Megastores physical sales chart in Lebanon, before being knocked off the top by Fairuz's comeback album Eh Fi Amal. HiTMARKER Albums Chart, for sales around the Arab world was topped for 42 consecutive weeks by 7. "Fi Hagat," qualified as a Megahit, topped Hitmarker Songs Chart for 15 consecutive weeks, the longest run on the top of the chart in its history.

The album also topped Mawaly Albums Chart for 14 consecutive weeks, and its lead single topped Mawaly Songs Chart for 13 consecutive weeks.

"Sheikh El Shabab" is the second hit from the album topping Hitmarker Songs Chart for 17 consecutive weeks. "Ya kether" also topped the chart for 8 consecutive weeks.

More than ten songs of 7 enter many charts on the internet or on Arabic radio stations. "Fi Hagat" took the second position in the list of Top 50 Songs of 2010, presented on Ayyam FM Jordan and in Top 100 on Arab Sounds. On the other side, "Sheikh El Shabab" was chosen as song of the year on Lebnan El Horr radio station and on Hala Fm Jordan.

Chart (2010)	Peak position
Virgin Lebanon Chart	1
Virgin Egypt Chart	1
Virgin UAE Chart	1
Virgin Maroc Chart	1
Nogomi Digital Chart	1
HitMarker Albums Chart	1

== Awards and nominations ==
World Music Awards
Year	Nominee / work	Award	Result
2011	Nancy Ajram	Best Selling Middle Eastern Artist (Nancy 7)	Won

Murex d'Or
Year	Nominee / work	Award	Result
2011	Nancy Ajram	Best Lebanese Female Singer	Won
2011	"Fi Hagat"	Best Arabic Song	Nominated
2011	"Sallemouly Aleih"	Best Arabic Single	Nominated
2011	"Sheikh El Shabab"	Best Lebanese Song	Nominated
2011	"Fi Hagat"	Best Video	Nominated
2011	"Sheikh El Shabab"	Best Video	Won
2011	7	Album of the Year	Won

Stars Cafe Magazine Awards
Year	Nominee / work	Award	Result
2011	Nancy Ajram	Best Female Artist	Won
2011	7	Best Album	Won
2011	"Fi Hagat"	Best Song	Won
2011	"Fi Hagat"	Best Lyrics	Won
2011	"Fi Hagat"	Best Music Arrangement	Won
2011	"Fi Hagat"	Best Melody	Nominated
2011	"Fi Hagat" music video	Best Music Video	Nominated
2011	"Sheikh El Shabab" music video	Best Music Video	Won

Jaras Scoop FM Awards
Year	Nominee / work	Award	Result
2010	Nancy Ajram	Best Female Artist	Won
2010	"Fi Hagat"	Best Song	Nominated
2010	"Sheikh El Shabab"	Best Song	Nominated

Melody FM Awards
Year	Nominee / work	Award	Result
2010	Nancy Ajram	Best Female Artist	Won
2010	"Fi Hagat"	Best Song	Nominated
2010	"Fi Hagat"	Best Music video	Nominated

Woujouh Men Lebnan Awards
Year	Nominee / work	Award	Result
2011	Nancy Ajram	Best Female Artist	Won

Middle East Music Awards (MEMA)
Year	Nominee / work	Award	Result
2010	Nancy Ajram	Best Artist	Nominated
2011	"Sheikh El Shabab"	Best Music Video	Won

Panet Survey
Year	Nominee / work	Award	Result
2010	Nancy Ajram	Best Female Artist	Won
2010	Nancy Ajram	Best Selling Digital Artist	Won
2010	Nancy 7	Most Downloaded Album	Won
2010	"Sheikh El Shabab"	Most Downloaded Song	Nominated

Arab Sounds Awards
Year	Nominee / work	Award	Result
2010	Nancy Ajram	Best Female Artist	Won
2010	7	Album of the Year	Nominated
2010	"Fi Hagat"	Best Video	Nominated

Music My Life Survey
Year	Nominee / work	Award	Result
2010	"Fi Hagat"	Best Hit	Won

Zahrat Al Khaleej Magazine Survey
Year	Nominee / work	Award	Result
2010	Nancy Ajram	Best Female Arab Singer (2nd place)	Won
2010	"Fi Hagat"	Best Music Video	Won

Best Of LBC Survey
Year	Nominee / work	Award	Result
2010	Nancy Ajram	Most Influential Celebrity	Won
2010	Nancy Ajram	Best Artist	Won
2010	7	Best Album	Won
2010	"Fi Hagat"	Best Music Video	Won

Panorama FM
Year	Nominee / work	Award	Result
2010	7	Best Arabic Album	Won
2010	"Ya Kether"	Best Khaliji Song	Won

MBC FM
Year	Nominee / work	Award	Result
2011	"As'aad Allah Masak"	Best Khaliji Song	Won

== Records ==
- The music video for "Fi Hagat" hit YouTube views four months after it was uploaded, becoming the most viewed Arabic video on the site.
- Ajram became the first Arabic artist to ever collect more than one Million likes on Facebook.
- 7 topped HitMarker albums chart for 42 consecutive weeks, the longest run on the top of the chart by any album.
- The album's first two singles occupied the apex of HitMarker for more than six months.
- The album is topping the Virgin Megastore Charts all over the Arab world 1 year after its release.
