= Nancy 10 =

Studio album by Nancy Ajram
- Released: July 10, 2021
- Recorded: 2019–2021
- Studio: Various: Istanbul Strings (Istanbul); Hadi Sharara (Beirut); Joe Baroudjian (Beirut); AB Brothers (Beirut); AIS (Cairo); ART (Cairo); Mixtape (Cairo); Mohammad Sakr (Cairo)
- Genre: Arabic pop; Synthpop; Dance pop
- Length: 48:42
- Label: In2Musica
- Producer: Hadi Sharara; Hany Yacoub; Bassem Rizk; Ahmed Ibrahim; Mohammed Mustafa

Nancy Ajram chronology
Nancy 9 (Hassa Beek) (2017)	Nancy 10 (2021)	Nancy 11 (2025)

Singles from Nancy 10
- 1. "Salamat" Released: July 23, 2021; 2. "Miyye W Khamsin" Released: November 6, 2021; 3. "Ma Te'tezer" Released: March 14, 2022; 4. "Aala Shanak" Released: October 6, 2022; 5. "Baddi Hada Hebbou" Released: January 26, 2023; 6. "Meshkeltak Alwahidi" Released: February 20, 2024

Nancy 10 is the tenth studio album by Lebanese singer Nancy Ajram. It was released on July 10, 2021, by In2Musica, four years after its predecessor Nancy 9 (2017). Ajram started working on the album in late 2018, after the end of her tour in the United States, the "USA Tour 2018". Originally scheduled to be released during 2020, Ajram postponed the album release to 2021 due to the COVID-19 pandemic.

In order to create this comeback record, Ajram enlisted a variety of writers and producers she previously has collaborated with, including Hadi Sharara, Bassem Rizk, Ziad Bourji, Walid Saad, Mohammed Yehia, Khaled Tag Eldeen, Amir Teima and Ahmad Madi, alongside new collaborations with Hany Yacoub, Ayman Koumayha, Nabil El Khoury, Belal Srour, Ali El Mawla, Shady Nour and Ahmed Erfan.

== Promotion and release ==
Ajram announced her tenth album in early 2021, starting a hashtag trend #Nancy10 on social media. The songs "Hobbak Bi Ye'wa", "Meshkeltak Alwahidi", "Gayya Maak", and "Baddi Hada Hebbou" were released as promotional singles. Spotify marked the album's release with billboards featuring the album cover in New York City's Times Square.

== Singles ==
"Salamat" was released on July 23, 2021, as the lead single from Nancy 10. The second single, "Miyye W Khamsin", was released on November 6, 2021.

The music video for the third single, "Ma Te'tezer", was released on March 14, 2022. It shows an abusive relationship and Ajram's attempt at running away. It has accumulated 14 million views in over six months.

"Aala Shanak" was released on October 6, 2022, as the album's fourth single. The music video for the song was directed by Leila Kanaan and has an Indian setting. It accumulated almost two million views in less than two days. The album's fifth single, "Baddi Hada Hebbou", was released on January 26, 2023.

== Track listing ==
Standard edition (Note: Credits are adapted from the description boxes of the album videos on Ajram's official YouTube channel.)
No.	Title	Lyrics	Music	Producer	Length
1.	"Salamat" (Salutations)	Shady Nour	Mohammed Yehia	Hadi Sharara	3:00
2.	"Baddi Hada Hebbou" (I Need Somebody to Love)	Ahmad Madi	Ziad Bourji	Hadi Sharara	4:14
3.	"Hobbak Bi Ye'wa" (Your Love is Growing Stronger)	Khaled Tag Eldeen	Walid Saad	Hany Yacoub	3:54
4.	"Meshkeltak Alwahidi" (Your Sole Problem)	Ali El Mawla	Ayman Koumayha	Bassem Rizk	3:22
5.	"Hayda Ana" (This is Me)	Emile Fahed	Yehia El Hassan	Bassem Rizk	3:25
6.	"Gayya Maak" (I'm Coming with You)	Khaled Tag Eldeen	Walid Saad	Ahmed Ibrahim	3:13
7.	"Ya Nas Goulouli" (Tell Me)	Christelle Bou Ghannam	Joseph Geha	Bassem Rizk	3:16
8.	"Ma Te'tezer" (Don't Apologize)	Nabil El Khoury	Nabil El Khoury	Bassem Rizk	3:28
9.	"Aala Shanak" (For You)	Shady Nour	Belal Srour	Hany Yacoub	3:14
10.	"Miyye W Khamsin" (150)	Nabil El Khoury	Nabil El Khoury	Bassem Rizk	2:54
11.	"Yama" (How Much)	Amir Teima	Walid Saad	Ahmed Ibrahim	4:08
12.	"Hayat" (Life)	Mohammed Rifai	Walid Saad	Hadi Sharara	3:10
13.	"Hagat Khousousiya" (Private Things)	Ahmed Sheta	Hamdy Seddik	Mohammed Mustafa	3:26
14.	"Aateb W Loum" (Blame and Accuse)	Ahmed Erfan	Mohammed Rahim	Mohammed Mustafa	3:51
Total length:					48:42

== Personnel ==
Adapted from the album liner notes.

- Yara Saad - design
- Elie Barbar - mastering, mixing (tracks 1, 2, 3, 4, 5, 6, 7, 8, 9, 10, 12)
- Ahmad Ibrahim - mixing (track 11)
- Mohammad Sakr - mixing (tracks 13, 14)
- Lara Zankoul - photographer

== Release history ==
Region	Date	Format(s)	Edition(s)	Label(s)	Ref.
Worldwide	July 10, 2021	Digital Download; Streaming	Standard	In2Musica	
Japan	December 19, 2021	CD	Standard	El Sur Records	
Various	January 12, 2022	CD	Standard	Club Andalos	
