= Maya Nasri =

- Born: Maya Hossam Asmar; 14 August 1976 (age 49); Miniara, Akkar, Lebanon
- Occupations: Singer, actress
- Years active: 1999–present
- Spouse: Ihab Lamey (m. 2010)
- Children: 3
- Musical career
- Genres: Arabic Pop; World; Dance
- Instrument: Vocals

Maya Hossam Asmar (Arabic: مايا حسام الأسمر; born 14 August 1976), better known by her stage name Maya Nasri (Arabic: مايا نصري), is a Lebanese singer, recording artist, and actress.

== Early life ==
Nasri studied acting and directing theater, television and cinema at the Lebanese University. In 1996, she started working as a TV presenter at Télé Liban, she also worked as a model.

== Career ==
Nasri participated in "Kas El Nojoum" in 1998 on the Lebanese Broadcasting Channel where she won all three medals. Her debut single was "Khalleeni Bel Jaw".

== Personal life ==
In 2010, Nasri married Egyptian filmmaker Ihab Lamey in a Church wedding ceremony in Beirut. On 5 October 2013, she gave birth to their first child, a girl they named Mikaella. Nasri announced online the news of daughter's birth with the message: "I gave birth to the most beautiful thing my eyes have ever seen. It was the gift of God to my small family". In 2015, during the pregnancy of her second child she revealed that a sonogram showed complications, which meant the fetus would require heart surgery within the first 10 days after birth. The life-saving surgery was performed on her son Giovanni, after he was born on 3 February 2015. On 18 December 2017, she gave birth to her third child, a girl, Manuella.

== Discography ==
- Akhbarak Eih? (2001) (How are you doing?)
- Law Kan Lak Alb (2003) (If You Had a Heart)
- Izzay Te’rafni (2005) (How Do You Know Me?)
- Jayi Lwa't (2008) (The Time is Coming..)

=== Singles ===
- "Enta habib 3yone" (1999)
- "Akher Hammi" (1999)
- "Ana Bahtaglak" (2004)
- "Aywa Keda" (2006/2007)
- "Ana Kont Eh" (2006/2007)

== Videography ==
- "Khallini bel Jaw" (2001)
- "Akhbarak Eih..?" (2001) – Tony Abou Elias
- "Ya Waheshni (2002)" – Myirna khayyat
- "Law Kan Lak Alb (2003)" – Ahmad El Mahdi
- "Ana Bahtaglak (2004)" – Mirna Khayyat Abou-Elias
- "Habit Hob (2004)" – Mhd. Gomea
- "Al Asmarani (2005)" – Salim elTurk
- "Rouh]] (2006)" – Emile Slaylati
- "Jaye ElWa2t" (2008) – Ahmad El Mahdi

== Filmography ==
- Code 36 (2007) – Egyptian movie
- Sultan elGharam ("Sultan of Love") (2007) – Egyptian TV series
- Kharej An elQanoun ("Against the Law") (2007) – Egyptian movie
- Wekalet Atiyya (2009) – Egyptian TV series
- eldictator (2009) – Egyptian movie
- Rijal Alhasm (2009) – Syrian TV series
- Men kel albeh (2011) - Lebanese TV series
- Al Serr (2017) - Egyptian Series (waiting to be released)
- Zenzana 7 (2020) - Egyptian movie
- Rim (2019) (Out Soon) Egyptian movie.
