= List of Arabic pop musicians =

This is a list of Arabic pop-music musicians. Not all are Arabs, but all perform at least in part in the Arabic language.

== A–G ==
- Layal Abboud
- Abdallah Al Rowaished
- Abdel Halim Hafez
- Ahlam
- Ahmed Adaweyah
- Ahmed Chawki
- Aida el Ayoubi
- Alabina
- Ali El Haggar
- Amal Arafa
- Amal Hijazi
- Amr Diab
- Amr Mostafa
- Angham
- Arwa
- Assala
- Asma Lamnawar
- Asmahan
- Assi El Helani
- Aswat Almadina
- Aziza Jalal
- Balqees Ahmed Fathi
- Carmen Suleiman
- Carole Samaha
- Cheb Mami
- Cheb Khaled
- Cyrine Abdelnour
- Dalida
- Dalida Khalil
- Dania Khatib
- Diana Karazon
- Diana Haddad
- Dina Hayek
- Donia Samir Ghanem
- Dounia Batma
- Ema Shah
- Emel Mathlouthi
- Ehab Tawfik
- Elias Karam
- Elissa
- Elyanna
- Fady Andraos
- Fairouz
- Fadel Shaker
- Farah Siraj
- Farrah Yousef
- Farid El Atrache
- Fares Karam
- Faudel

== H–M ==
- Haifa Wehbe
- Hakim
- Hala Al Turk
- Hamada Helal
- Hani Shaker
- Hiba Tawaji
- Hisham Abbas
- Hoda Saad
- Hussam Al-Rassam
- Hussain Al Jasmi
- Humood AlKhudher
- Issam Alnajjar
- Ishtar
- Iwan
- Jannat Mahid
- Joseph Attieh
- Julia Boutros
- Kathem Al Saher
- Khaled El-Ghandour
- Laila Ghofran
- Latifa
- Leila Mourad
- Maher Zain
- Majid Al Muhandis
- Majida El Roumi
- Maya Nasri
- Melhem Zein
- Melissa
- Marwan Khoury
- Mohammed Abdu
- Mohammed Assaf
- Mohamad Bash
- Mohamed Fouad
- Mohamed Hamaki
- Mohamed Mounir
- Moustafa Amar
- Myriam Fares
- Nabyla Maan
- Nassif Zeytoun

== N–Z ==
- Najwa Karam
- Nancy Ajram
- Nawal Al Zoghbi
- Nawal El Kuwaitia
- Nelly Makdessy
- Nicole Saba
- Noura Rahal
- Nourhanne
- Nxdia
- Omar Al-Abdallat
- Omar Souleyman
- Pascale Machaalani
- Rabeh Sager
- Rachid Taha
- Ragheb Alama
- Ramy Ayach
- Rola Saad
- Rouwaida Attieh
- Ruwaida al-Mahrouqi
- Ruby
- Saad Lamjarred
- Sabah
- Saber Rebaï
- Salma Rachid
- Samira Said
- Saint Levant
- Shada Hassoun
- Shams
- Sherine
- Sherine Wagdy
- Simone
- Sofia El Marikh
- Sol Band
- Souad Massi
- Shaaban Abdel Rahim
- Suzanne Tamim
- Tamer Hosny
- Thekra
- Toni Qattan
- Umm Kulthum
- Warda Al-Jazairia
- Wadih El Safi
- Wael Jassar
- Wael Kfoury
- Walid Toufic
- Yasmine Hamdan
- Yara
- Yuri Mraqqadi
- Zeyne

== See also ==
- Lists of musicians
