= Egyptian hip-hop =

Music genre or scene

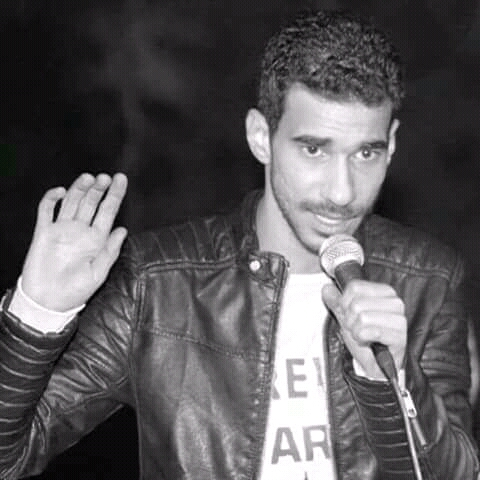
Ahmed Nasser "El Joker" one of the most known Egyptian rappers

Egyptian hip hop is a form of hip hop music in Egypt that draws its inspiration from local, regional and global events. Since the early 2000s, Egyptian Hip Hop has gained significant popularity and is listened to by a global audience prompted by the internet as the latest medium of technology and music streaming services such as Spotify and Anghami.

== History ==
Hip hop originally emerged in the United States in the 1970s and it has influenced the emergence of hip hop music in Egypt. In the early 1990s, hip hop music entered the Arab world and has since then grown into a popular music genre in the region and in Egypt. Palestine can be credited with the first Middle East country to internalize hip hop as they were the first to introduce western styles of music making and beats, thereby creating a discography dedicated to resistance against Israeli settler-colonialism. In regards to Egypt, hip hop music gained traction in Egypt more recently. It was not until the early 2000s that hip hop began to rise in popularity in Egypt.

In the late 1990s and early 2000s, Egyptian musicians and producers were influenced by the American and Western hip hop music and Egyptian music groups such as MTM (Mezzika Tilakhbat Mukkah), MC Amin, Egy Rap School, and Way Crow Family began to insert hip hop elements in their own music. However, at first, Egyptian hip hop did not grow very fast and the amount of hip hop music that was produced was not extensive because the majority of radiostations were controlled by the Egyptian government which attempted to prevent hip hop music from dominating Egyptian radio. It was not until the rise of the Internet that Egyptian hip hop reached a greater audience and after the rise of social media, Egyptian musicians started to share their music online and as a result, Egyptian hip hop music gained significant popularity in Egypt and in the global context.

== Audience ==
Egyptian hip hop is especially listened to by individuals between the ages of 12 and 30 who come from a variety of social backgrounds. The music genre appealed to the younger generations because of its relatability to their day-to-day lives. Hip hop in general, but also Egyptian hip hop, offers the youth and its audience a means through which they are able to express themselves.

== Societal influences of Hip Hop in Egypt ==
Hip hop and rap have historically had a slow growing interest in Egypt and the wider MENA at large. However, the Arab Spring catapulted the genre into popularity. Hip hop in Egypt is a tool for protest and rebellion against the status quo. Egyptian hip hop carries criticism against poverty, crisis and chaos. And while the genre is gaining more traction among the youth, the general culture of music and art creation for the sake of commercial value makes it difficult for Egyptian hip hop to penetrate the music industry as big artists.

== Egyptian hip hop and the media ==
Considering the current social media presence of the younger generation in Egypt and the MENA region at larger, one of the ways that Egyptian hip hop is becoming increasingly popularized is through social media. Media such as SoundCloud and YouTube, but also newer outlets such as TikTok is allowing creators on various apps to share music of their preference. This has created a domino effect whereby Egyptian music is spread globally and therefore more widely recognised. The increased attention to Egyptian Hip Hop has culminated into the popular streaming platform Spotify creating a complete Egyptian rap/Hip Hop playlist called Melouk-El-Scene (translated to mean 'kings of the scene') in 2019. The playlist contains the most popular Hip Hop artists of today, including Abyusif, Ahmed Nasser"El Joker",Wegz and Marwan Moussa.

== Language ==
The language present in Egyptian hip hop is Egyptian Arabic and occasionally, English. For example, MTM uses primarily Egyptian Arabic. However, the English language is also increasingly used in Egyptian hip hop since more Egyptian hip hop groups began to insert the English language in their music in order to reach a greater non-Arab speaking audience.

== Trap music ==
Trap music is a sub-genre of hip hop which emerged in the United States of America in the 1990s. Since rap and hip hop began to seep into Egypt's urban environment, it has stayed relatively underground and it stayed out of the spotlights. However, in the last few years, the trap scene began to gain popularity and it entered the spotlight, pushed by a handful of passionate artists like Abyusif, Wegz, Marwan Moussa, and Marwan Pablo. The Egyptian scene continues to bloom, widely influenced by the dark and gripping trap sound that is gaining a foothold in the wider Middle Eastern scene.

A new generation of rappers have taken over the hip hop industry, and trap music has now become Egypt's second most streamed genre after Mahraganat, with a slew of artists emerging on the scene every year. Egyptian rappers often mix local genres and instruments with trap, creating their own unique variation of the genre.

Many Mahraganat artists have fused the authentic Egyptian sound of Mahraganat with Trap music creating a new sub genre titled 'Trap Shaa'bi'. The authenticity and the validity of the new music subgenre had sparked many debates in the music industry. Egyptian Rapper Batistuta and Music Producer, DJ Totti, were among some of the voices who maintained the view that this fusion is but an expected evolution of Mahraganat music and not necessarily a new subgenre.

Trap Shaa'bi artists include: 3enba, Double Zuksh, Abo Elanwar, Producer Lil Baba, Producer Coolpix, Producer Molotof, 3ab3az, Wezza Montaser, Adham Elsherif, Youssef El Rousse and many others.

== See also ==
- Mahraganat
- African hip hop
- Arabic hip hop
