= Wegz =

Egyptian rapper and actor

Wegz ويجز
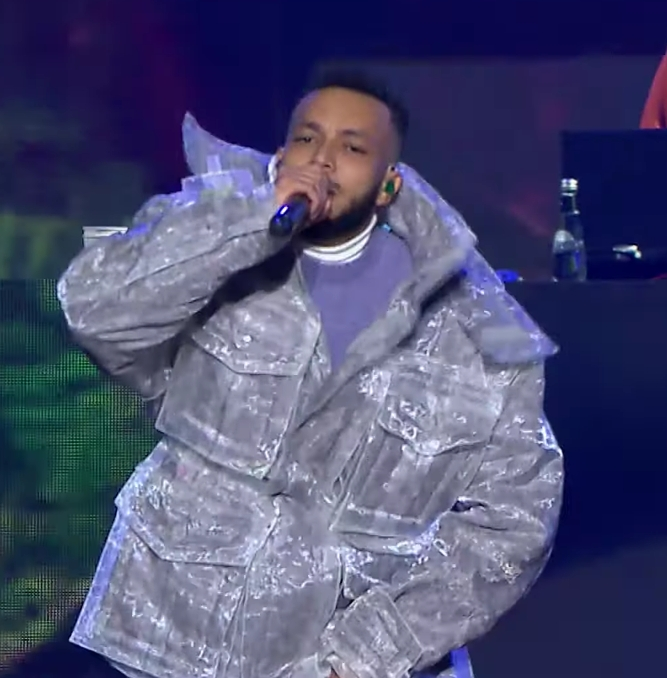
- Wegz in January 2023

Background information
- Born: Ahmed Ali Shahat أحمد علي شحات; September 11, 1998 (age 28); Alexandria, Egypt
- Origin: Al Wardian, Alexandria, Egypt
- Genres: Arabic hip hop; trap; Mahraganat; Shaabi; R&B; Afrobeats
- Occupations: Rapper; singer-songwriter; actor
- Years active: 2017–present

Wegz (ويجز; born Ahmed Ali Shahat (أحمد علي شحات); 11 September 1998) is an Egyptian rapper, singer-songwriter, and actor. Raised in the Al Wardian neighbourhood of Alexandria, he is widely credited with bringing Egyptian trap music and Arabic hip hop into the mainstream of the Arab music industry. His music blends Western trap and hip hop with Egyptian Mahraganat, Shaabi folk music, R&B, and Afrobeats.

Wegz first gained national attention with the 2018 single "TNT" and broke into wider Arab mainstream consciousness with the 2020 single "Dorak Gai" (دورك جي, "You're Next"), which accumulated more than 24 million YouTube views within two months of release. In 2022, his crossover single "El Bakht" (البخت, "Luck") peaked at number 14 on the Billboard Billboard Arabia Hot 100 and was named the most-streamed song in the Arab world that year. He has been the most-streamed artist in Egypt on Spotify for three consecutive years (2020, 2021, and 2022), and in December 2022 was named Spotify's most-streamed Arab artist across the MENA region.

== Early life ==
Ahmed Ali Shahat was born on 11 September 1998 in Alexandria, Egypt, and grew up in the working-class Al Wardian (الورديان) neighbourhood. His father's roots are from Luxor in Upper Egypt, though some Arabic-language sources also note Yemeni ancestry on his paternal side. Because his father's work required the family to move frequently, he attended multiple schools as a child, a circumstance he has credited with developing his outgoing personality and ability to form friendships quickly.

In a 2022 interview on the Arabic programme AB Talks, Wegz spoke about growing up with limited financial means, sometimes having only 20 to 50 Egyptian pounds per day to spend. He has cited his early love of reading and writing as a formative influence on his lyrical approach.

He completed his higher education at the El-Agami Higher Institute of Management Sciences in Alexandria. After graduating, he briefly worked at a telecommunications company before leaving to pursue a full-time career in music.

The stage name "Wegz" was given to him by a close friend. In interviews he has said he does not know the meaning of the name and that he regrets never having asked.

== Career ==
=== Beginnings (2017–2019) ===
Wegz began releasing music in 2017. His first track on Spotify was "Batalo Fake" (بطلوا فيك, "Stop Being Fake"), a collaboration with rapper Hesham Raptor (Hesham Hassan), which is considered one of the early recordings of the Egyptian underground trap wave. In 2018, he released "TNT," a low-budget production that earned approximately 1.8 million views on YouTube and established him as a pioneer of the Egyptian trap sound. That same year he released "Kharban" (خربان), a collaboration with Mahraganat pioneers Sadat and Amr Haha.

His 2019 single "Bazeet" (باظت, "It's Ruined") was the first of his tracks to go widely viral across Egypt, played in shops, minibuses, and at public gatherings. In 2019 he also released the EP Geziret El Batal (جزيرة البطل, "Hero's Island") and the Shaabi-influenced single "Laqtta" (لقطة).

=== Mainstream breakthrough (2020–2021) ===
On 11 March 2020, during the early weeks of COVID-19 lockdowns, Wegz released "Dorak Gai" (دورك جي, "You're Next") in collaboration with producer Molotov. The song became a defining anthem of the Egyptian lockdown period, spreading rapidly through its use of street-language slang over a trap production. It surpassed 24 million YouTube views within two months of release and is widely considered the moment that Arabic rap entered Egypt's mainstream music culture.

Later that year, Wegz released further singles including "Wahd Wa Eshrin" (واحد وعشرين, "Twenty One"), "El Ghasala" (الغسالة, "The Washing Machine"), and "Skerty," placing five songs on Spotify's most-streamed tracks in Egypt for 2020. He was named Spotify Egypt's most-streamed artist of 2020, finishing ahead of veteran pop star Amr Diab. In December 2020, he launched an official clothing line in collaboration with Egyptian fashion label Ohanna.

In 2021, Wegz released the single "3afareet El Asphalt" (عفاريت الإسفلت, "Asphalt Demons") and a joint single "Msh Khalsa" (مش خالصة) with Moroccan rapper ElGrandeToto. He was again named Spotify Egypt's most-streamed artist of 2021. That year he made his acting debut in the television comedy series Bimbo, directed by Amr Salama and also starring Ahmed Malek and Huda El Mufty, broadcast on Shahid VIP. He was included on the 2021 Arab music stars list compiled by Forbes Middle East and was featured by GQ Middle East among the 21 most exciting young musicians in the world.

=== International recognition (2022) ===
In February 2022, Wegz released "El Bakht" (البخت, "Luck"), produced by Rahal. The song marked a notable stylistic shift: its romantic lyrics about unrequited love were set over an Afro-pop-tinged beat, in contrast to his earlier trap material. It accumulated more than three million YouTube views within its first 48 hours and peaked at number 14 on the Billboard Arabia Hot 100.

Later in 2022, he released "Amira" and "Anghami," and contributed "B3oda Ya Belady" (بعودة يا بلادي, "Returning, O My Country") to the soundtrack of the Egyptian documentary film Captains of Zaatari (كباتن الزعتري).

In November 2022, he recorded "Ezz Al Arab" (عز العرب, "The Glory of the Arabs"), an anthem commissioned as part of the official soundtrack of the 2022 FIFA World Cup in Qatar. On 18 December 2022—the date of the World Cup Final between Argentina and France—he performed at the halftime show at Lusail Stadium, becoming the first Arab rapper to perform at a FIFA World Cup final. He also performed at the 2022 Red Sea International Film Festival in Saudi Arabia.

In December 2022, Spotify announced that Wegz was the most-streamed Arab artist across the MENA region for that year. He was also the second most-streamed artist on the Arab music platform Anghami, with approximately 144 million streams. At the All Africa Music Awards (AFRIMA), he received five nominations: Best Male Artist in Northern Africa, Song of the Year, Producer of the Year, Artist of the Year, and Best Artist, Duo or Group in African Contemporary. He was also honoured with the GQ Men of the Year Award in 2022.

=== Continued career (2023–present) ===
In November 2023, Wegz was profiled by The New York Times in an article focused on his ambitions to bring Arabic hip-hop to a global audience. He undertook extensive international touring, performing for Arab diaspora audiences across North America and Europe, including a sold-out show at the Théâtre Beanfield in Montreal in October 2023.

In 2025, Wegz released two EPs, Aqareb (عقارب, "Scorpions") and Gadwal El Darb (جدول الضرب, "Multiplication Table"), alongside singles including "ELWA3D," "Kalam Forsan" (كلام فرسان) featuring veteran Egyptian singer Mohamed Mounir, and "Girlfriend" featuring French R&B singer Tayc.

== Artistry ==
Wegz's sound is characterised by its eclecticism. His early work was rooted in trap and mumble rap, but he has progressively incorporated Mahraganat, Shaabi, R&B, Afrobeats, pop, and drill into his productions. He makes extensive use of Auto-Tune pitch processing, which became integral to his signature vocal style and helped shape the sound of Egyptian trap during the late 2010s.

His lyrics, written entirely in Egyptian Arabic, draw on colloquial slang and the lived experiences of working-class youth in Egyptian cities. He has cited his musical influences as including Egyptian and Arab artists such as Ahmed Adaweyah, Mohamed Mounir, Cheb Mami, and Dalida, alongside international hip-hop figures including Mobb Deep, Future, Young Thug, and ASAP Rocky.

Wegz has described taking pride in representing Egypt internationally while keeping his Egyptian audience as his primary focus. He has explained that because Egyptians are already familiar with international music, he is able to draw on global beats and layer Egyptian cultural references over them. Although he has sung exclusively in Arabic (with occasional English phrases), he has indicated openness to recording in other languages.

== Discography ==
=== Extended plays ===
Year	Title	Notes
2019	Geziret El Batal (جزيرة البطل)	
2020	Dorak Gai (دورك جي)	With Molotov
2025	Aqareb (عقارب)	
2025	Gadwal El Darb (جدول الضرب)	

=== Selected singles ===
Year	Title	Notes
2017	"Batalo Fake" (بطلوا فيك)	Featuring Hesham Raptor
2018	"T.N.T"	
2018	"Kharban" (خربان)	Featuring Sadat and Amr Haha
2018	"Saleny" (سالني)	
2019	"Bazeet" (باظت)	
2019	"Laqtta" (لقطة)	
2020	"Dorak Gai" (دورك جي)	With Molotov
2020	"Wahd Wa Eshrin" (واحد وعشرين)	
2020	"El Ghasala" (الغسالة)	
2020	"Skerty"	
2021	"3afareet El Asphalt" (عفاريت الإسفلت)	
2021	"Msh Khalsa"	With ElGrandeToto
2022	"El Bakht" (البخت)	Peaked at No. 14 on Billboard Arabia Hot 100
2022	"Amira" (أميرة)	
2022	"Anghami"	
2022	"B3oda Ya Belady" (بعودة يا بلادي)	From Captains of Zaatari
2022	"Ezz Al Arab" (عز العرب)	2022 FIFA World Cup anthem
2025	"ELWA3D"	
2025	"Kalam Forsan" (كلام فرسان)	Featuring Mohamed Mounir
2025	"Girlfriend"	Featuring Tayc

== Filmography ==
=== Television ===
Year	Title	Role	Notes
2021	Bimbo	Supporting	Directed by Amr Salama; with Ahmed Malek and Huda El-Mufti; Shahid VIP

== Awards and recognition ==
Year	Award / Recognition	Notes
2020	Spotify Egypt Wrapped	Most-streamed artist in Egypt
2021	Spotify Egypt Wrapped	Most-streamed artist in Egypt
2021	Forbes Middle East	Arab Music Stars list
2021	GQ Middle East	21 Most Exciting Young Musicians in the World
2022	Billboard Arabia Hot 100	"El Bakht" peaked at #14
2022	GQ Men of the Year	Award winner
2022	AFRIMA	5 nominations: Best Male Artist in Northern Africa; Song of the Year; Producer of the Year; Artist of the Year; Best Artist, Duo or Group in African Contemporary
2022	Spotify MENA Wrapped	Most-streamed Arab artist in the MENA region
2022	Anghami	Second highest-streamed artist (144 million streams)
2023	The New York Times	Profile: "The Egyptian Rapper Who Wants to Take Arabic Hip-Hop Worldwide"
