= Hakim (singer) =

Egyptian singer (born 1962)

Hakim عبد الحكيم عبد الصمد كامل
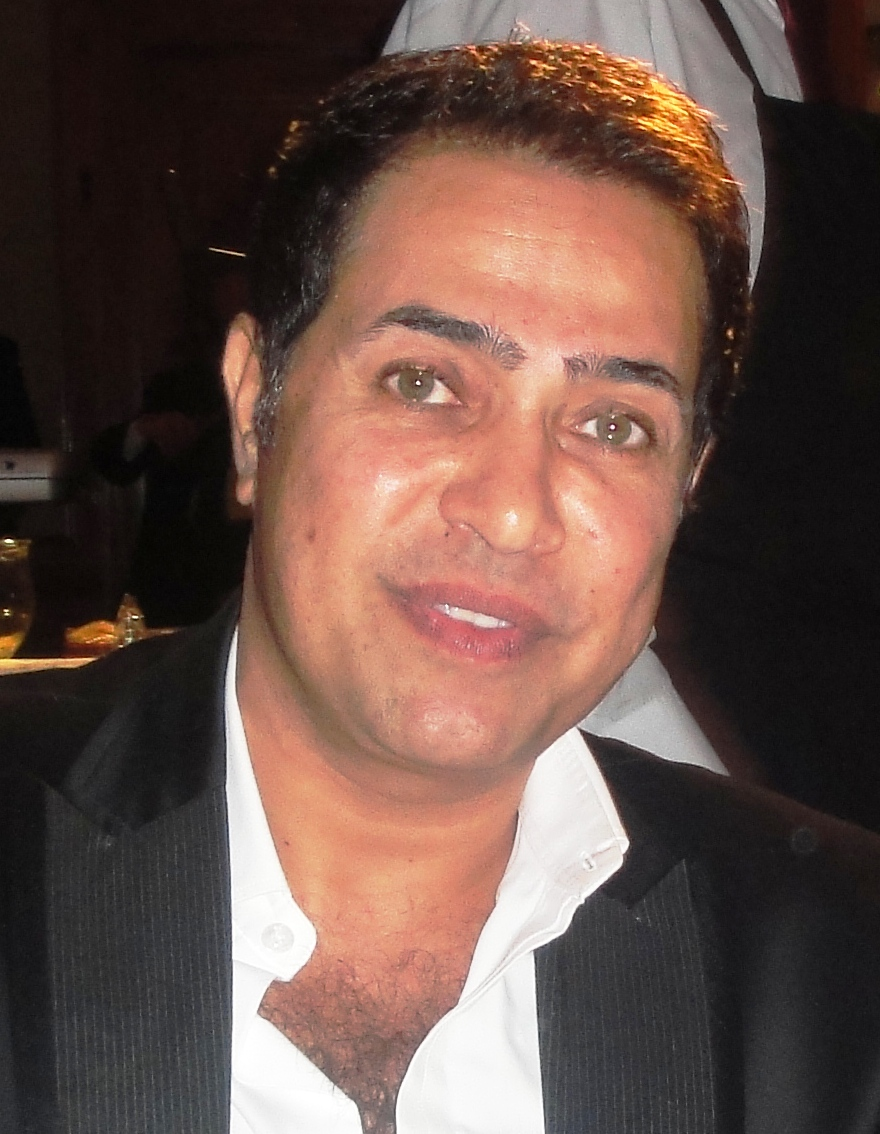
- Hakim in 2009

Background information
- Born: Abd El-Hakim Abd El-Samad Kamel; October 7, 1962 (age 63); Maghagha, El Minya, Egypt
- Origin: El Minya, Egypt
- Genres: Folk, shaabi, Middle Eastern, belly dance,
- Occupations: Singer, actor
- Years active: 1992–present

Abdel Hakim Abdel Samad Kamel (Arabic: عبد الحكيم عبد الصمد كامل; born October 7, 1962), known by the mononym Hakim (Arabic: حكيم), is an Egyptian shaabi singer.

== Biography ==
Hakim was born in Maghagha, a small town in el-Minya, Egypt. He grew up with the sound of working- and middle-class tradition of Egyptian Sha'abi music, and admired the great Egyptian Sha'bi singer Ahmed Adaweyah. He reportedly began singing at the age of 8, and practiced mawawīl, the vocal improvisations which often begin an Egyptian Sha'bi song. He formed a band while in high school, obtained his college degree in Cairo, and then returned to el-Minya to continue making music, before moving back to Cairo. He had collaborated with several international singers throughout his career, such as: Narada Michael Walden and Olga Tañon in 2002, James Brown in 2004 and Don Omar in 2007.

== Musical styles ==
- Shaabi
- Middle Eastern
- Belly dance
- Al Jeel
- Egyptian
- World music

== Discography ==
- Nazra (1992)
- Nar (1994)
- Efred (1997)
- Hayel (1998)
- Yaho (2000)
- The Lion Roars – Hakim Live in America (2000)
- Talakik (2002)
- Taminy Alek (2004)
- El Youm Dol (2004)
- Kolo Yoross (2005)
- Lela (2006) (with James Brown and Stevie Wonder)
- "Tigy Tigy" (with Don Omar) (2007)
- Ya Mazago (2011)
- Ala Wadaak (2017)
