= Siilawy =

Jordanian-Palestinian singer and songwriter (born 2001)

Siilawy حسام السيلاوي
- Born: Hussam Al-Siilawy; 2001 (age 24–25); Jordan
- Genres: Levantine pop, Arabic pop
- Occupations: Singer; songwriter
- Years active: 2020–present

Siilawy (السيلاوي; born Hussam Al-Siilawy, حسام السيلاوي c. 2001) is a Jordanian-Palestinian singer and songwriter. Known for emotionally direct Levantine pop, he rose to prominence during the COVID-19 pandemic after videos of his performances went viral on TikTok, and has since built a wide following among younger Arab listeners. He performs under the mononym Siilawy, derived from his family name.

== Early life and career beginnings ==
Siilawy was born around 2001 in Jordan. Before pursuing music, he worked in his family's coal-trading business. He had always been drawn to writing as a means of emotional expression, but did not initially plan a music career. His entry into music came about by chance during the COVID-19 lockdowns of 2020, when he recorded himself singing lyrics he had written about Palestine; a friend uploaded the video to TikTok, where it went viral. Seeing the audience's reaction online motivated him to continue writing and recording.

He does not play any musical instruments.

== Career ==
=== Breakthrough (2020–2021) ===
Siilawy began uploading songs to YouTube around 2020. Within approximately one year, he had amassed around 100,000 YouTube subscribers and approximately 12 million views.

His songs draw heavily from personal experience, covering themes of family, lost love, and emotional vulnerability. Notable early songs include "Leali" (ليالي, meaning my nights), a line from which went viral across TikTok and attracted widespread attention, and "Wenak" (وينك, meaning where are you), a lighter love song that accrued more than 2.5 million YouTube views and also spread on TikTok. His song "Kodam Ilkol" (قدام الكل, meaning in front of everybody) reached 30 million YouTube views within two months of release.

An earlier song, "Leish Trouhi" (ليش تروحي, why did you leave), addressed his mother's absence during his infancy; he later removed it from his YouTube channel, though it remained available on SoundCloud. His song "Yaba" (يابا, meaning dad) was the first time his father learned he was a singer.

Siilawy also collaborated with merchandise company Kees, whose founder Amer Al-Haj approached him about placing his lyrics on apparel, an early sign of his commercial crossover appeal.

=== Live performances and continued growth (2021–2024) ===
Despite the online success, Siilawy reportedly contemplated quitting music in 2021 due to the pressures of audience expectations, releasing a farewell song before deciding to attempt live performance. His debut concert sold out within three days of announcement, an outcome he described as completely unexpected. The experience of performing live changed his outlook: seeing audience members moved to tears, he abandoned the idea of retiring from music.

He subsequently performed at a second concert in September 2021 alongside Jordanian rappers Bilal Shabib, Karam Shrideh, and Saleh Zamel, and musicians Ahmad Alawar and Zaidoon.

In 2023, Siilawy participated in the fourth edition of Red Bull SoundClash Jordan, held at the Amman Exhibition Park on 23 June 2023, where he competed alongside rapper BiGSaM. He described the event less as a competition than as a friendly challenge between friends. Among his favourite songs from his own discography, he has cited "Lamma Tkouni," "Qarbi Alaya," and "Ashanek."

=== Nassaba and recognition (2026) ===
In April 2026, Siilawy released "Nassaba" (ناصبه, broadly meaning a trap or betrayal), a Levantine pop track built around a clarinet motif and framing romantic betrayal as an accusation. The song was included in The National's chronological guide to the best Arabic songs of 2026, with the publication describing his style as "wounded romantic" and noting his appeal to younger Arab audiences through emotional openness.

== Personal life and controversies ==
=== Marriage and family ===
Siilawy married a woman named Sandra, though the couple separated within months of their wedding. He publicly acknowledged the separation, citing accumulated pressure and difficulties, while noting that the two maintain a family connection through a daughter whose existence he revealed publicly in April 2026.

=== Religious controversy and family estrangement (2026) ===
In late April 2026, Siilawy made remarks during a livestream questioning certain religious interpretations, invoking Quranic verse Al-Baqarah 2:170 to challenge what he characterised as unexamined tradition. The comments generated significant public backlash. Shortly thereafter, his father made a public statement disowning him, referencing the Hadith concept of the ruwaybida (one who speaks on matters beyond his standing) and declaring his non-responsibility for his son's actions before God. He also announced he had blocked his son on all platforms and would not be in contact until he saw a meaningful change in his conduct.

Siilawy subsequently defended himself, stating his comments had been taken out of context, and denied the accusations of irreligion levelled at him.

=== Hospitalisation controversy (May 2026) ===
On 2 May 2026, Siilawy posted messages on his social media accounts from inside a hospital, claiming his family had taken him there against his will and was forcing him to take medication. His posts included his location and prompted widespread concern among followers, with some calling on authorities to verify his safety and legal status. The circumstances remained publicly unresolved, with observers divided over whether the hospitalisation reflected a family intervention related to his mental state or an act of forced confinement.

== Discography ==
=== Selected songs ===
Year	Title	English meaning	Notes
2020	"Leish Trouhi" (ليش تروحي)	"Why Did You Leave"	Later removed from YouTube; available on SoundCloud
2020	"Yaba" (يابا)	"Dad"	
2020–21	"Leali" (ليالي)	"My Nights"	Viral TikTok hit; over 3 million YouTube views
2021	"Wenak" (وينك)	"Where Are You"	Over 2.5 million YouTube views
2021	"Kodam Ilkol" (قدام الكل)	"In Front of Everyone"	30 million views within two months of release
2021	"Less Ma'ki" (لسه معك)	"Still with You"	Nearly 2 million views within two days of release (December 2021)
2023	"Lamma Tkouni" (لما تكوني)	"When You Are"	Cited by Siilawy as among his favourite personal songs
2023	"Ashanek" (عشانك)	"For Your Sake"	Cited by Siilawy as among his favourite personal songs
2026	"Nassaba" (ناصبه)	"A Trap" / "Betrayer"	Featured in The National 2026 Arabic songs list
