= Shaaban Abdel Rahim =

Egyptian singer (1957–2019)

Shaaban Abdel Rahim شعبان عبد الرحيم
- Born: Shabaan Abdelrahim; March 15, 1957; Cairo, Egypt
- Died: December 3, 2019 (aged 62) Cairo, Egypt
- Genre: Sha'abi
- Occupation: Singer
- Years active: 1980s–2019

Shaaban Abdel Rahim (born as Qassem Abdel Rahim) (Arabic: شعبان عبد الرحيم), also known as Sha'bola (Arabic: شعبولا), (15 March 1957 – 3 December 2019) was an Egyptian pop (Sha'abi) singer, formerly working as makwagi (man who irons clothing) and known for catchy songs with political lyrics.

== Early life ==
Sha'bān Abdel Rahīm was born in Cairo in a poor family, his birth name was Qassem but he is known by his stage name Sha'ban, he worked for many years as a foot-operated laundry presser before his songs catapulted him into stardom.

== Music career ==
Following a string of sensationalist hits, Abdel Rahīm became one of the most popular Egyptian Sha'bī singers. Egyptian Sha'bī is a category of popular class music that can be described as urbanized folk music.

In 2000, Sha'bān's breakthrough song "Ana Bakrah Israel" (I Hate Israel) accompanied by the catchy refrain "But I Love Amr Moussa", caused a great deal of controversy, and many were surprised that it passed Egyptian censors. Many of Shaaban's songs were sold informally on cheaply processed cassette tapes. His poor background, informal language, and frank lyrics have made him very popular with the Egyptian public.

Since then, Sha'bān continued to produce popular political songs, often quickly following current events. After the September 11, 2001 attacks, he produced a song titled "Yā 'Amm 'Arabī" (Literally: "Oh Arab People," meaning "Hey Arabs"). His song "Bin Bin Bin Bin Bin Bin Laden" was on the Egyptian airwaves before startled state censors banned it. He got back at the top of the Arab hit parade with "The Attack on Iraq" / "Don't Bomb Iraq". The hit could be heard from taxis in downtown Cairo streets:

Enough!
Chechnya! Afghanistan! Palestine! Southern Lebanon! Golan Heights!
And now Iraq, too? And now Iraq, too?
It's too much for people! Shame on you!
Enough! Enough! Enough!

In 2005, he produced a song about the Muhammed cartoon controversy entitled "We’re All Out of Patience", and in 2006 a song about the 2006 Israeli-Lebanon conflict. During 2010 Ramadan season, an episode with Sha'bān, in Ibrahim Issa's Hamra (Red) television talk show, was focusing on defending the right to smoke hashish.

In 2017 he released a song called "Trump Is Crazy" mocking America's president Donald Trump and attacking Trump's decision to move the US embassy in Israel to Jerusalem and blaming the inaction of Arab states

Islām Khalīl, the songwriter and an Arabic teacher at an elementary school in Qalyubia responsible for "I Hate Israel", "Bombing Iraq" and other politically contentious songs sung by the performer, said he had to teach Abdel Rahīm the meaning behind some of the ideas behind his songs.

== Death ==
Abdel Rahim died on 3 December 2019 at the age of 62 in Cairo due to heart failure.

== Legacy ==
Shaaban Abdel Rahim a self-made artist who was once a laundry worker eventually become Egypt Shaʿbi singer.

=== Children ===
Abdel Rahim had five children, 4 boys and a girl, he named one of his sons Adaweyah after his friend and fellow singer Ahmed Adaweyah, all his sons followed in their father's footsteps becoming singers, Adaweyah became a Mahraganat singer with the other three brothers sticking to their father's Shaabi style, his son Essam went viral in 2022 after some internet drama that later turned out to be an act, he explained the situation as just Reality TV
