= Nedmaneh =

Studio album by Najwa Karam
- Released: 2001
- Recorded: 2001
- Genre: Al Jeel; Pop music Arab Music
- Length: 33:21
- Label: Rotana/EMI Arabia; 7243 5 34015 2 8 E2-34015
- Producer: Tony Anqah; Jihad A'kel; Ameen Aakef

Najwa Karam chronology
Oyoun Qalbi (2000)	Nedmaneh (2001)	The Very Best Of Najwa Karam (2001)

Nedmaneh (also romanized as Nadmanah, Arabic: ندمانة) is Najwa Karam's eleventh studio album and one of her best-selling recordings. It shipped an estimated 4 million units worldwide.

== Track listing ==
1. Yal Haneet (You just fell in love with me)
2. Nedmaneh (Regret)
3. 'Aaskah (Falling in love)
4. Ana Meen (Who am I?)
5. El Jar Abel El Dar (People rather than places)
6. Roba'i Wa Khomasi (Confused)
7. Mkassar 'Asa (Scapegoat)
8. 'Aaskah (Instrumental)
