= Naghmet Hob =

Studio album by Najwa Karam
- Released: 1994
- Recorded: 1994
- Genre: Al Jeel; Pop music Arab Music
- Length: 33:02
- Label: Rotana/EMI Arabia; 7243 5 27882 2 4 E2-27882

Najwa Karam chronology
Ana Ma'akon (1993)	Naghmet Hob (1994)	Ma Bassmahlak (1995)

Naghmet Hob (also romanized as Naghmat Hob, Arabic: نغمة حب) is the fourth album by Najwa Karam, released on the Rotana label in 1994. It was her breakthrough, which made her a star in the Arabic-music world.

== Track listing ==
1. "Law Habaytak (If I Loved You)"
2. "Elala (La La)"
3. "Law Ma Kenna (If We Weren't Here)"
4. "Al Ors (The Wedding)"
5. "Helm Ennar (Dreams of Courage)"
6. "Wrood Eddar (Roses of the Garden)"
7. "Naghmet Hob (The Rhythm of Love)"
