= Maghroumeh =

Studio album by Najwa Karam
- Released: 1998
- Recorded: 1998
- Genre: Al Jeel, Pop music, Arab Music
- Length: 37:30
- Label: Rotana/EMI Arabia; 0946 3 10993 2 8 E2-10993

Najwa Karam chronology
Ma Hada La Hada (1997)	Maghroumeh (1998)	Rouh Rouhi (1999)

Alternative Cover

Maghroumeh (also romanized as Maghroumah, Arabic: مغرومة) is Najwa Karam's eighth studio album.

== Track listing ==
1. "Maghroumeh" (I'm in love)
2. "Wada'ato" (I said goodbye to him)
3. "Ghamzeh" (A wink)
4. "Noqta al-Satr" (Point on the line)
5. "Mahsoub Alayi" (I have to)
6. "A'am Beqoulo" (They are saying)
7. "Telt Malek" (A beautiful appearance)
8. "El-Toba" (I'll never do it again)
