= Akter Min Aey Waqit =

Akter Min Aey Waqit أكتر من أي وقت

Studio album by Laila Ghofran
- Released: 2005
- Recorded: 2004
- Genre: Arabic; Arabic pop
- Length: 36
- Label: Rotana

Laila Ghofran chronology
Ahoda ِAl Klam (2003)	Akter Min Aey Waqit أكتر من أي وقت (2005)	El Garh Mn Nseeby (2009)

Singles from Akter Min Aey Waqit
- 1. "Ashalhalk"

Akter Min Aey Waqit (Arabic: أكتر من أي وقت; English: More Than Ever) is the eleventh studio album by Moroccan singer Laila Ghofran released by Rotana on 17 February 2005. The album was well received by the public especially following the massive success of its lead single, Ashalhalk. The album contains eight songs and is the last Ghofran album released by Rotana before the artist cut ties with the record label.

== Album information ==
In this album, Ghofran collaborated with a number of songwriters, such as Amir Taima, Riyad Al-Hamshari, Ahmed Ali, Mohammad Rifai, and Wissam Sabry. As for the melodies, the songs were composed by Riyad Al-Hamshari, Tamer Ali Hassan, Mohammad Rifai, Aser Ashour, and Rashida Ali.

== Release ==
The album was released on 17 February 2005, by Rotana. For the album's artwork, Laila appeared with a new and youthful look, which she later justified by saying she lost weight while preparing the album, as she told Al-Ahram magazine. The album's artwork caused controversy because Laila removed her last name the cover, something that she later justified this by saying that she wanted to test the audience to know they're opinions about her new music, regardless of her name.

== Singles ==
Ashalhalk: The song was released in March 2005 and accompanied by a music video directed by Mohammad Joma'a and shot in Beirut.

== Album reception and departure from Rotana ==
The album was well received by the public and had very good sales, especially after the tremendous success the album's lead single "Ashalhalak" had. However, Rotana insisted that the album failed to have any commercial success, all while violating the terms of the contract signed between them and Laila. According to the artist, the contract said that the record label should produce three music videos for songs from the album, but they failed to do so and only one music video was shot for the lead single.

Laila said that Rotana's insistence on the album's failure shocked her, especially since she was one of the first Arab artists to join the record label in the 1990s. Laila stated that she was then surprised by Rotana's withholding of her financial dues before Rotana asked her to drop any right to file a lawsuit against them later, which Laila agreed on in order to receive her money from them.

== Tracklist ==
1. Akter Min Aey Waqit
2. Magol
3. Ashalhalk
4. Ya Reat
5. Tabt Ana Maak
6. Eshkon
7. Habibk zaman
8. Ghaltat Meen
