= Kibir'el Hob =

Studio album by Najwa Karam
- Released: November 30, 2005
- Recorded: 2005
- Genre: World, Arabic
- Length: 31:16
- Label: Rotana
- Producer: REG Project; Tony Anqah

Najwa Karam chronology
Shu Mghaira..! (2004)	Kibir'el Hob (2005)	Hayda Haki (2007)

Professional ratings
Review scores
Source	Rating
3arabia Music	5/5 stars

Kibir'el Hob (Arabic: كبر الحب) is Najwa Karam's fifteenth studio album. It was released in 2005 by Rotana Records as her 2006 album. Najwa began recording sometime in mid-2005 after promotion from her last effort stopped. Three singles from the album have been released so far.

== Track listing ==
1. Bkhaf Mnil'May (I'm Scared Of Drowning)
2. Ma Byinchibea (Can't Get Enough)
3. Kibir'el Hob (Love Got Greater)
4. Baddak Terjaa (Do You Wanna Come Back?)
5. Hamseh Hamseh (Softly Softly)
6. Chou Hal Hala (What kind of beauty is that?)
7. Talet Marra (The Third Time)
8. Bhebak Walaa (I Love You A Lot)
