= Khallini Shoufak =

Khalini Shoufak

Studio album by Najwa Karam
- Released: June 10, 2009
- Recorded: 2007–2008
- Genre: Arabic
- Length: 34:53
- Label: Rotana Records
- Producer: Rotana

Najwa Karam chronology
Am Bemzah Ma'ak (2008)	Khalini Shoufak (2009)	Hal Layle... Ma Fi Nom (2011)

Khallini Shoufak (Arabic: خليني شوفك) is an album by Najwa Karam, released on June 10, 2009. The album was released by Rotana. Seven of the songs have a Dabka theme.

== Track listing ==
1. "Allah Yeshghelo Balo"
2. "Harami"
3. "Aboos Einak"
4. "Albi Masna'a Baroud"
5. "Khalini Shoufak"
6. "Wala'ha"
7. "Eidak"
8. "El Dini Em"

== About the songs ==
The Album is said to have a pure traditional Lebanese Music style. Similar to her 2003 released album, Saharni, the 2009 Khalini Shoufak included three Beat songs: Edak, Wallae, and Khalini Shoufak. The songs "Albi Massnaa Baroud" and "Allah Yishghillo Balo" are Lebanese Pop Style. While "Abous Einak" has an old Lebanese arrangement style. The song "El Dini Im", was the first song written by Najwa Karam throughout her music career.
