= Shu Mghaira..! =

Shu Mghaiara..!

Studio album by Najwa Karam
- Released: 2004
- Recorded: 2004
- Genre: World/Arabic
- Length: 37:56
- Label: Rotana
- Producer: —

Najwa Karam chronology
Saharni (2003)	Shu Mghaiara..! (2004)	Kibir'el Hob (2005)

Shu Mghaira..! (Arabic: شو مغيره) is Najwa Karam's fourteenth studio album. It was released in 2004.

== Track listing ==
1. "Behawak" (With Your Love)
2. "Shu Kent Teqele" (What You Used To Tell Me)
3. "Ya Donya" (Oh World)
4. "'Areft Akhtar" (I Chose Right)
5. "Shu Mghaiara" (You Have Changed)
6. "Akher Dawa" (The Last Medicine)
7. "Lailat Ma Kan Mashe" (The Night He Was Leaving)
8. "Liesh Magharab" (Why Living Abroad)
