= The Very Best of Najwa Karam =

The Very Best Of Najwa Karam

Greatest hits album by Najwa Karam
- Released: 2001
- Recorded: 2001
- Genre: World/Arabic
- Length: 71:07
- Label: Rotana/EMI Arabia

Najwa Karam chronology
| Nedmaneh (2001) | The Very Best Of Najwa Karam (2001) | Live in Concert (2001) |

The Very Best of Najwa Karam is Najwa Karam's first greatest hits compilation and is composed of 15 of her biggest hits from 1989 to 2000.

== Track listing ==
1. "Oyoun Qalbi"
2. "Khaleek al-Ardh"
3. "Majbourah"
4. "Rouh Rouhi"
5. "Ariftu Albi Lamin"
6. "Maghroumeh"
7. "Nuqta al-Satter"
8. "Ma Hada La Hada"
9. "Hazi Helo"
10. "Khayarouni"
11. "Ma Bassmahlak"
12. "Sehrani"
13. "Naghmet Hob"
14. "Wrood Eddar"
15. "Ya Habayeb"
16. Bonus "Najwa 2000" medley video
