= Saharni =

Studio album by Najwa Karam
- Released: 2003
- Recorded: 2003
- Genre: World/Arabic
- Length: 33:29
- Label: Rotana
- Producer: —

Najwa Karam chronology
Tahamouni (2002)	Saharni (2003)	Shu Mghaira..! (2004)

Saharni (Arabic: سحرني) is Najwa Karam's thirteenth studio album released in 2003.

== Track listing ==
1. Saharni (He Charmed Me)
2. Lehbayeb (The Loved Ones)
3. Edhak Lil Dounya (Smile To The World)
4. Chou el-Maneh (What's Stopping You?)
5. Ma'houra Alayk (I Feel Sorry For You)
6. Hak el-Layali (Those Nights)
7. Ketr el-Dalal (Playing Hard To Get)
8. Saharni (Instrumental)
