= Am Bemzah Ma'ak =

Aam Bemzah Maak

Studio album by Najwa Karam
- Released: July 17, 2008
- Recorded: 2007–2008
- Genre: Arabic
- Length: 37:22
- Label: Rotana Records
- Producer: Rotana

Najwa Karam chronology
Hayda Haki (2007)	Aam Bemzah Maak (2008)	Khallini Shoufak (2009)

Singles from "Am Bemzah Ma'ak"
- 1. "Am Bemzah Ma'ak" Released: 2008; 2. "Ma Bkhabi Aleyk"; 3. "Ta'a Khabik"

Am Bemzah Ma'ak (Arabic: عم بمزح معك) is the seventeenth studio album from the Lebanese singer Najwa Karam. The album contains 8 tracks, and worked with the famous Lebanese composer Melhem Barakat on two songs. Najwa Karam already released a music video for the album's title, Aa Bemzah Ma'ak.

== The album ==
Najwa released the album Am Bemzah Ma'ak in July 2008 under the distribution of Rotana. The album consists of eight songs including the title track "Am Bemzah Ma'ak" which is the first single.

== Track listing ==
1. Int'l Shams - You are the sun
2. Am Bemzah Ma'ak - I'm joking with you
3. Gatalna El Khof - The fear killed us
4. Amant Galby - I reserved my heart
5. El Helm El Abyad - The white dream
6. Kamel Ala Rohi - Continue on my soul
7. Ta'a Khabik - Come, let me hide you
8. Ma Bkhabbi Aleyk - I don't keep anything from you

== About the songs ==
Most of the album songs contain the unique traditional Lebanese beat:

- "Ta'a Khabik" is a good example of futuristic Lebanese developed rhythm.
- "Ammanti Galbi" puts two styles of music together and has a strong upbeat presence, like the cultural dabkeh.
- "Kammel Ala Rouhi" is a slow meaningful song with excellent voice stands provided by Najwa Karam and contains many high notes.
- "Kammel Ala Rouhi" and "Gatalna El Khof" were composed by Melhem Barakat and are the two examples of songs in which Najwa Karam expresses emotions through her voice.
- "El Helm El Abyad" is a wedding song, which starts with a cultural mawal at the start then an upbeat, tabla beat which matches with her former hits.
- "Enta El Shams" is an upbeat tempo similar to her other song "Baddak Terja'a", and "Ma Bkhabi Aleyk" is also on the slow upbeat side. The same song was also sung by Lebanese singer Diana Haddad at 2001.

Overall the album "Am Bemzah Ma'ak" is similar to her former releases in the 1990s.

== Music videos ==
- Am Bemzah Ma'ak - Director: Fadi Haddad on YouTube
- Ma Bkhabi Aleyk - Director: Randa Alam on YouTube
- Ta'a Khabik - Director: Said El Marouk on YouTube

== Music Cooperations ==
Writers, arrangers and composers of the songs include Tameem, who was working with Najwa Karam for the first time:

- Emad Shams Al Deen: Wrote and composed the hit-song Am Bemzah Ma'ak and also was the composer of the wedding-song El Helm El Abyad.
- Michelle Joha: Wrote the romantic song Int'l Shams.
- George Mor'ab: Was the composer of Int'l Shams.
- Melhem Barakat: Composed the two major songs Gatalna El Khof and Kamel Ala Rohi.
- Hady Shararah: Arranged 3 songs. The beautiful song Gatalna El Khof, The master-piece Kamel Ala Rohi and the hit-single Ta'a Khabik.
- S'oud Al Sharbately: Wrote the cultural dabke song Amant Galby.
- Nizar Francis: He played a big role in this album when he wrote 3 of the songs. Gatalna El Khof, El Helm El Abyad and Kamel Ala Rohi.
- Tony An'aa: Arranged Int'l Shams and Amant Galby.
- Mohammad Mostafa: Arranged Am Bemzah Ma'ak.
- Wissam El Amir: Composed Amant Galby and Ma Bkhabi Aleyk.
- Danny Helloh: Arranged El Helm El Abyad.
- Fares Iskandar: Wrote Ta'a Khabik.
- Salim Salameh: Composed Ta'a Khabik.
- Tony Salameh: Wrote Ma Bkhabi Aleyk.
- Tameem: Arranged Ma Bkhabi Aleyk.
