= Islam Chipsy =

Egyptian musician

Islam Chipsy إسلام شيبسى
- Birth name: Islam Said
- Origin: Egypt
- Genres: Electronic; shaabi
- Years active: 2013–present
- Website: Islam Chipsy on Facebook

Islam Said (Arabic: إسلام سعيد), stage name Islam Chipsy (إسلام شيبسى [ʔesˈlæːm ˈʃibsi]), (Note: The word Chipsy is based on the originally Egyptian brand of potato chips now owned by Lay's.) is an Egyptian musician. His music incorporates elements of traditional Arabic wedding and electronic instruments. Their style is seen as part of a new wave of Shaabi music, referred to as electro-shaabi or Mahraganat (Arabic: مهرجانات) (although Chipsy dissociates himself from this, as his music is primarily instrumental).

He was formerly a member of Egyptian electronic music group EEK (or Islam Chipsy and EEK). He was later a member of another Egyptian electronic music group, called Dabke.

== Career ==
Said adopted the stage name Chipsy when another keyboardist with name "Islam Said" began to take credit for his tracks. Since Said was frequently seen eating Chipsy (local brand of Lay's crisps in Egypt), people started to refer to him by the name, and it stuck.

He played the keyboard alongside two other band members, Khaled Mando and Islam Tata, both drummers, collectively styled as Islam Chipsy and EEK.

Said's profile in Western media has grown, along with other electro-shaabi artists who are also signed to the 100COPIES label in Cairo (Said since 2014).

In 2014, Chipsy and EEK gave toured the UK, performing live to crowds in Bristol, London, and Newcastle.

On 10 May 2019, Chipsy, then part of an Egyptian electronic music group called Dabke, performed at the opening concert of the Kunstenfestivaldesarts in Brussels, Belgium.

== Musical style and collaborations ==
Said does not want to be associated with the Mahraganat movement, as it is very much based on MCs' voice work, while his work is generally instrumental. As shaabi music became more popular,

After Said began working with the British Council, he engaged in collaborations with British dubstep producers, including Faze Miyake, Kode9, Pinch, Mumdance, and Artwork.

== Recognition ==
A reviewer in The Guardian called Said a "preternaturally talented keyboard player", with a unique style consisting of blasts of tone clusters deployed by alternately punching, slapping and karate-chopping his keyboard.
