= Nelly Makdessy =

Lebanese singer (born 1979)

Nelly Makdessy نيللي مقدسي
- Born: Nelly Milad Makdessy; October 10, 1979 (age 47); Beirut, Lebanon
- Genres: Arabic pop music, Lebanese, dance
- Occupations: actress; singer
- Years active: 2000–present
- Labels: Music Master, Rotana

Nelly Milad Makdessy (Arabic: نيللي ميلاد مقدسي, Lebanese Arabic: [ˈnel.li ˈmaʔdesi]; born October 10, 1979) is a Lebanese actress, singer, songwriter, record producer, instrumentalist and model.

Nelly started her career in the amateurs TV program Kaass El Noujoum which was broadcast on the Lebanese channel LBC in early 1990s, she sang in the category of Folklore Music. Makdessy released four albums in her career and eleven singles. her first album ' produced two hit singles including "Shouf El Ein" and "Machie Al Maghror". It was her most successful album until the 2005 album Oof Oof. In 2008, Makdessy released two hit singles, "Ya'esh El Hob" and "Ya Nar Nari".

== Biography ==
=== Early years: Kaass El Noujoum ===
She started her musical career in the amateurs TV program Kaass El Noujoum presented on the popular entertainment channel Lebanese Broadcasting Corporation (aka LBC), where she won the first place, and got three golden cups. She was also studying law at the same time. After her success in Kaass El Noujoum she devoted herself to music and she signed to a record label in Beirut called Music Master. In their studios she recorded several songs. She started experimenting with different instruments, sounds, genres and vocal styles. Makdessy began to appear on a variety of television channels, including Middle East Broadcasting Center (aka MBC), Qatar, Dubai, Arab Radio and Television Network (aka ART) and the popular entertainment channel Lebanese Broadcasting Corporation (aka LBC) as promotion.

=== 2000–2005: Shouf El Ein, Ahli Arab and Ana Eih ===
On October 21, 2000 after one year and half of hard work, Nelly Makdessy released her debut album, Shouf El Ein. The album instantly became a major hit all over the Arab World. The songs "Machie Al Maghror", and the title track "Shouf El Ein" were released almost simultaneously and all became major hits. The album was certificated Gold for its sales by the International Federation of the Phonographic Industry. Also, before the album's release, a promotional single was released to the Arabic broadcasting channels.

In 2002, before coming to fame again and releasing a new album, a fake scandal of Nelly Makdessy was published as a message on a Yahoo! Group and then to other websites including music forums. The message said that Makdessy was a porn star in the United States and it even showed fake photos of her having sex. As a result of these allegations, Makdessy's popularity decreased. She signed with Rotana Records and released a second album, Ahli Arab. It was not as successful as Makdessy's debut album, Shouf El Ein (2001), partly because of the rumor. Two singles were released from the album "Shabky Shanoha" which made a success because of its weird lyrics and "Halo Hali". The music video for "Halo Hali", which came in 2003 a year after the release of the album, made its debut on Rotana Channel which was a newly launched channel back then. Makdessy's third album Ana Eih was released later that year. It featured two singles: "Ana Eih", which was released in early 2004, and the number-one hit single "Eshtag" in Summer 2005.

=== 2006–present: Oof Oof, and releasing singles ===
Makdessy was not satisfied by the policies that Rotana had in 2004. Her contract was terminated after a few months of the release of Ana Eih (2003). Rotana explained the reason to the national press that Nelly was not selling a good number of copies and that she was causing the company a loss. Makdessy denied Rotana allegations later explaining the real reason was that she took the music video for "Ana Eih" and gave it to other channels which was against the policies of Rotana. The videos were exclusively owned by Rotana and could not be aired on other channels. However, Rotana realized that the other artists were not satisfied by the policy as well so it stopped it.

Makdessy returned to Rotana in late 2005 with the release of her fourth album Oof Oof (2005). It is her last album with Rotana Records and the latest album to date. The first single "Oof Oof" was sent to Lebanese radio stations in October 2005. Sout Al Ghad FM was the first to launch the song. The "Oof Oof" music video was premiered on the Rotana Music channel on December 31, 2005. It reached the top five on the "Pepsi Chart Show". "Oof Oof" was a cover of the Turkish song of the same name by Gülşen.

A second single from the album was released in Summer 2006 for the song "Bass Hoss", her last single with Rotana until she began to produce singles by herself. The first single "Ya'esh El Hob", was premiered on an Egyptian music channel called Melody. It was followed by her single "Ya Nar Nari", a Khaliji song which was released in late July 2008 and was directed by Leila Kanaan.

As a result of the big demand that Makdessy received regarding the song "Mohtaga Leek" from Oof Oof, the song was shot as a music video and was released on Rotana Channel along with others. The song was originally released back in 2005 but the video did not come until late 2008, almost four years from the original release. Nelly surprised her fans with the 2010 summer hit "Ya Dada". The music video, which was directed by a new director, is inspired by Walt Disney's Pirates of the Caribbean. However, there has been no news regarding Makdessy's upcoming work.

In September 2017, Nelly Makdessy released a new single and Music video, entitled 'Kunt Atmanna', directed by Randa Alam.

In July 2023, Nelly released a new single and music video entitled "El Helo Tall" and it was a well-received summer hit.

== Discography ==
=== Albums ===
- 2001: Shouf El Ein
- 2002: Ahli Arab
- 2003: Ana Eih
- 2005: Oof Oof

=== Singles ===
Year	Title	Album
2000	"Wahen Wah"	-
2001	"Shouf El Ein"	Shouf El Ein
2002	"Machie Al Maghror"	Shouf El Ein
2002	"Shabky Shanoha"	Ahli Arab
2003	"Halo Hali"	Ahli Arab
2004	"Ana Eih"	Ana Eih ?!
2005	"Eshtaq"	Ana Eih ?!
2006	"Oof Oof"	Oof Oof
2006	"Bass Hoss"	Oof Oof
2008	"Ya'esh El Hob"	-
2008	"Akhiran"	Ahli Arab
2008	"Ya Nar Nari"	-
2008	"Mohtaga Leek"	Oof Oof
2010	"Ya Dada"	-
2016	"Mafish Reggala"	-
2017	"Kunt Atmanna"	-
2018	"Hala Hala"	-
2019	"Hanin"	-
2022	"Jarahetni Oyouno El Soda"	-
2023	"La Tkabber Rasak"	-
