= Mohamad Bash =

- Born: November 6, 1982 (age 43)
- Origin: Damascus, Syria
- Genres: Arab Pop, Soul, R&B
- Occupations: Singer, composer, song writer, guitarist
- Years active: 2009 – present
- Labels: Jammo art Production
- Website: www.mohamadbash.net/

Mohamad Bash or Mohamed Bash (Arabic: محمد باش) is a Syrian singer, writer and composer.

== Career ==
Bash in February 2009 was admitted to the sixth season of the Lebanese reality TV and talent show Star Academy. Twenty candidates, from all over the Middle East aiming at starship, get to compete for the “Star” title of the talent show. Bash's journey on the talent show ended one step away from the semifinal phase.

Bash was invited for the opening ceremony of the Syrian 2009 International Film Festival. The event took place in the capital city of Damascus in October 2009. This event was a crucial introduction of Bash as a professional artist in the music and entertainment world.

Composed and written by Bash, “Rah Ensaki” is the first official single that was released in November 2010.

In early 2012, Bash scored a record deal with Jammo Art Production; an American music production company with its main headquarters in Cairo, Egypt. Bash released his debut album, Yaa Mnn, in July 2012 during the Holy month of Ramadan. Upon its release, Yaa Mnn received positive reviews from media, press and music critics as it topped the Mazika albums chart for weeks. In 2013, Bash participated in the campaign of "Hakki Etaalam" in order to get Syrian children back to school

== Discography ==
=== Singles ===
Single	Year
Ra7 Ensaki	2010
Can't Stop Missing You	2011
7obak Damarni	2011
Majnoun	2011
Ahla Ayam	2012

=== Albums ===
Album	Year
Yaa Mnn	2012

== Videography ==
Year	Title	Album	Director
2012	Yaa Mnn	Yaa Mnn	Karim Kabbara
2012	Asbahna w Amsaina	Yaa Mnn	Karim Kabbara
2012	Ya Rabbi Sobhanak	Yaa Mnn	Karim Kabbara
2012	Behak Kol Al Anbeyaa	Yaa Mnn	Karim Kabbara

== Awards ==
Year	Award	Category	Results
2009	Almadina FM's questionnaire	Best Rising Singer	Won
2010	The Canadian Website Fanoos	Sexiest Arab Man	Won
2010	Almadina FM's questionnaire	Best Rising Singer	Won
2011	MEMA Awards	Best Rising Singer	Won
2012	Murex D'or Awards	Best Rising Male Star	Nominated
2012	MEMA Awards	Best Rising Singer	Won
2012	Almadina FM's Survey	Best Ramadan serial prelude in 2012 " Ahla Ayam "	Won
2012	Version FM's Survey	Best Ramadan serial prelude in 2012 " Ahla Ayam "	Won
2012	Radio Fann Syria's Survey	Best Ramadan serial prelude in 2012 " Ahla Ayam "	Won
2012	Rotana Style's questionnaire	" Best Male Youth Singer"	Won
2012	Rotana Style's questionnaire	" Best TV serial prelude in 2012 "	Won
