= Menni Elak =

Studio album by Najwa Karam
- Released: May 13, 2017
- Recorded: 2016–2017
- Genre: Arabic
- Length: 31:41
- Label: Ziyara
- Producer: Ziyara

Najwa Karam chronology
Hal Layle... Ma Fi Nom (2011)	Menni Elak (2017)	Karizma (2023)

Menni Elak (Arabic: مني إلك) is an album by Najwa Karam, released on May 13, 2017. Najwa released the album after an absence of 5 years, and it includes 8 songs in the Arabic Lebanese accent, in which she collaborated with a group of Lebanese and Egyptian poets, composers and composers, including Mounir Bouassaf, Wissam El Amir, Tony Saba, Joseph Juha, Wael Al Ashqar, Melhem Abu Shdeed, Michel Geha and Tariq Akkaf. And dedicated it to her brother Nicola, who died before it was released and was releasing a song after another on her official channel on YouTube. The album "Menni Elak" ranked first on iTunes, followed by Heba Toji in second place, while the 840 summer play ranked third and Nancy Ajram ranked fourth. In Lebanon, Najwa's album ranked first in Virgin Megastore, followed by Mike Massey's album in second place, While Nancy's album ranked third, Assi El-Hellani's album ranked fourth and Heba Touji's album ranked fifth. Internationally, Najwa's album ranked fourth through iTunes on the international albums list.

== Track listing ==
Songs on album:

No.	Title	Length
1.	"Amar L Eichaa"	3:44
2.	"Ah Mnel Gharam"	3:33
3.	"Nezelt L Bahr"	3:53
4.	"Yehreklak Albak"	4:47
5.	"L denyi Thadeet"	3:26
6.	"Taa Bawrid"	4:41
7.	"Habibi Min"	3:04
8.	"Nawm Ayni"	4:19
Total length:		31:27

=== Bonus Tracks ===
- Yen3ad 3layk
- Ne7na Cha3bak Ya Allah
