= Ma Hada La Hada =

Studio album by Najwa Karam
- Released: 1997
- Recorded: 1997
- Genre: Lebanese Music; Pop music Arab Music
- Label: Rotana/EMI Arabia; 7243 5 26176 2 3 E2-26176

Najwa Karam chronology
Hazi Helo (1996)	Ma Hada La Hada (1997)	Maghroumeh (1998)

Professional ratings
Review scores
Source	Rating
Arabic Music Info Source	2/5 stars

Ma Hada La Hada (Arabic: ما حدا لحدا) is Najwa Karam's seventh studio album.

== Track listing ==
1. "El Tahady" (The competition)
2. "Habib el-Zein" (My love)
3. "El-Helw" (The beautiful one)
4. "Ma Hada La Hada" (No one is for anybody)
5. "Bedy Mnagem" (I want a magician)
6. "Bthouthiq Feeyi" (You believe in me)
7. "Bgareb Ensa" (I try to forget)
