= Shams el-Ghinnieh =

Studio album by Najwa Karam
- Released: May 1991
- Recorded: 1991
- Genre: World/Arabic
- Length: 39.46
- Label: City Media sarl
- Producer: Joseph Boustany

Najwa Karam chronology
| Ya Habayeb (1989) | Shams el-Ghinnieh (1991) | Ana Ma'akon (1993) |

Shams el-Ghinnieh (Arabic: شمس الغنية), released in 1991, is the second album from Najwa Karam.

== Track listing ==
1. "Shams el-Ghinnieh" (Sun of the Song)
2. "Hab el-Hawa" (The wind blows)
3. "Wasse' Ya Dar" (Make the place bigger)
4. "Ya Rakib Al Abbayah" (You who is on the Abbayah)
5. "Habibi Ghab" (My Love is gone)
6. "Bala Bala" (Yes, Yes)
7. "Khelis el-Sahar" (The night has ended)
