= Tahamouni =

Studio album by Najwa Karam
- Released: 2002
- Recorded: 2002
- Genre: Arabic
- Length: 43:00
- Label: Rotana/EMI Arabia; 7243 5 40625 2 0 E2-40625

Najwa Karam chronology
Live in Concert (2001)	Tahamouni (2002)	Saharni (2003)

Tahamouni (Arabic: تهموني) is Najwa Karam's 12th studio album.

== Track listing ==
1. Bara'ah (Acquittal)
2. Ew'a Tekoun Ze'alt (I Hope You're Not Mad at Me)
3. Ya Medawebni (Oh, You Who Consumed Me)
4. Tahamouni (They Accused Me)
5. Benoub (Never)
6. Temasken (He Played the Humble)
7. Be Gharamak Masloubi (Drawn into Your Passion)
8. El Omr Meshwar (Life is a Journey)
9. Ya Medawebni (Instrumental)
