= Najwa Karam =

Lebanese singer (born 1966)

- نجوى كرم
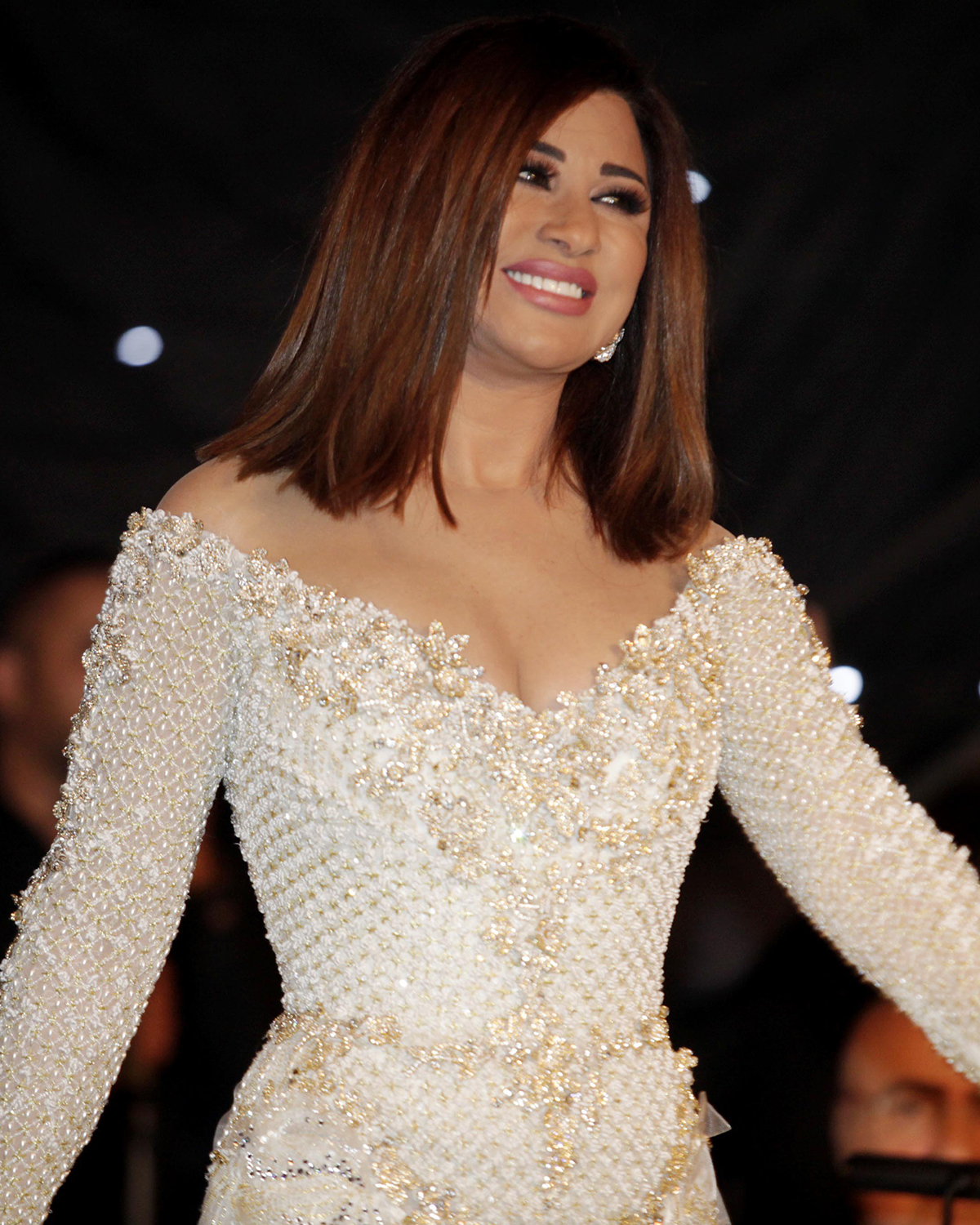
- Karam in 2017
- Born: Najwa Karam Karam نجوى كرم كرم; 26 February 1966 (age 60); Zahlé, Lebanon
- Occupations: Singer; Producer; Songwriter; Celebrity
- Years active: 1987–present
- Spouse(s): Youssef Harb (m. 2000; div. 2002) Omar Al-Dahmani (m. 2024)
- Musical career
- Genre: Arabic music
- Instruments: Electronic keyboard, oud
- Labels: Relax-In International (1989–1991); CM (1992–1993); Rotana/EMI (1994–2011); Rotana (2019–2025); Universal Music (2013–present)

Najwa Karam (Arabic: نجوى كرم, Lebanese Arabic pronunciation: [ˈnaʒwa ˈkaɾam]; born 26 February 1966) is a Lebanese singer, songwriter, and producer. She has sold an estimated 60 million records and is one of the highest-selling recording artists in the Middle East.

Karam incorporates Mawwal and traditional Lebanese elements into her musical work. She appeared on Forbes's 2023 "50 Over 50: Europe, Middle East, and Africa" list, which features "influential individuals over the age of 50 in those regions".

During the 1990s, Karam was often referred to as Shams el-Ghinnieh (Sun of the Song) in reference to her album of the same name.

Other albums she released in the 1990s include Naghmet Hob (“Melody of Love”), Ma Bassmahlak (“I Won't Let You"), Maghroumeh (“In Love”), and Rouh Rouhi (“Soul of My Soul”). In 2000, Karam's tenth album, Oyoun Qalbi (“Eyes of My Heart”) became her highest-selling album.

In 2001, her album Nedmaneh (“I Regret”) earned her a Murex d'Or award for Best Arabic Artist and Rotana Records awards, including Artist of the Year, Album of the Year, and Highest-Selling Album of the Year.

Throughout the late 2000s, Karam's albums Hayda Haki (“This Is A Talk”), Am Bemzah Ma'ak (“Just Kidding With You”) and Khallini Shoufak (“Let Me See You”) also achieved commercial success. Karam frequently worked with musician and composer Melhem Barakat and collaborated with singer Wadih el Safi on their 2004 debut, "W Kberna" ("We Grow Old Together").

== Early life ==
=== Early years ===
Najwa Karam was born on February 26, 1966 in Zahlé, Lebanon.

Karam learned to sing at a young age. She attended an Evangelical secondary school and later earned a bachelor's degree in philosophy. Karam taught geography and Arabic at Eastern College in Zahlé, Lebanon for two years.

== Career ==
=== Layali Lubnan: 1985–1988 ===
In 1985, she participated in the television singing competition Layali Lubnan ("Lebanese Nights") against her father's wishes. Karam performed a traditional Lebanese Mawwal song and won first place. She then went on to study at the Lebanese Institute of Music for four years. During this period she was mentored by Lebanese composers Zaki Nasif and Fouad Awad. In 1987, she participated in another television contest called Laylat Haz ("A Night of Shaking").

=== First Studio Albums: 1989–1993 ===
==== Shams el-Ghinnieh ("The Sun of Song") & Ana Ma’akom ("I Am With You") ====
The record label Relax-in International released Karam's first album,⁣⁣ Ya Habayeb⁣⁣ ("Loved Ones"), in 1989. The album contained seven tracks in traditional Lebanese/folklore style. Due to her previous exposure to the Lebanese public, the album was well-received in Lebanon but did not receive much attention from the rest of the Arab world.

After a three-year hiatus, Karam returned to the scene with her follow-up album, Shams el-Ghinnieh. The album title was inspired by her nickname, "Shams el-Ghinnieh" ("Sun of the Song"). The album was recorded by another small record company, CM.

In 1993, Karam signed with a small Saudi Arabian record label for her new album. The new album was called Ana Ma'akon ("I Am With You").

=== Rotana: 1994–1999 ===
Karam joined the Middle East's largest recording label, Rotana, owned by Saudi Arabian Prince Al-Waleed bin Talal.

Work on a new album began immediately. By mid-1994, an eight-track album, Naghmet Hob ("The Rhythm of Love"), had been completed and was prepared for release in the Middle East. It fused Lebanese tradition with Arab pop. The success of Naghmet Hob led to a concert tour and many awards, including a prize from the Lebanese Broadcasting Association in 1994 for Best Artist.

In 1995, Karam began work on her fifth release, which was also her second album under Rotana. It was titled Ma Bassmahlak and closely followed the traditional style of Naghmet Hob, though this new album was deeper in the lyrical content of the tracks.

==== Hazi Helo ("I'm Lucky") ====
On June 16 1996, she released her album, Hazi Helo ("I'm Lucky"). The title track, "Hazi Helo", and three other songs, "Khayarouni" ("Made Me Choose"), "Ala Mahlak" ("Take it Easy"), and "El-Ghorbil", were the most popular in the album. Following the release of "Hazi Helo", Karam embarked on a world tour that included many Arab states, parts of Europe, and the United States.

==== Ma Hada La Hada ("Nobody is for Anybody") and Maghroumeh ("In Love") ====
Karam's next album was "Ma Hada La Hada". The tracks on the album differed from those of Karam's previous albums, with a more contemporary sound influenced by foreign beats and synthesized melodies. The Arabic radio stations received the song "El Tahady" three months before the album's official release. By the time of the album's release, the song's popularity had dwindled and the relatively low sales of "Ma Hada La Hada" were attributed to this factor. However, the title track did become quite popular. It had harmonious musical arrangements that used a traditional Lebanese instrument, the Qanoun, along with other traditional instruments such as the violin and the accordion.

The 1998 release, "Maghroumeh", marked Karam's transition from a purely traditional Lebanese artist to the blend of traditional and contemporary Arabic that she is known for today. It features poetic Arabic lyrics sung with Karam's power and extensive use of contemporary and Arabic instruments, such as the tarabuka, mijwiz, mizmar, and tabal. The title track, "Maghroumeh" ("I Am in Love"), was shot as a video clip and was the most popular song from the album. Other notable songs include "Ghamza" ("The Wink") and the love song "Noqta al-Satr" ("Full Stop").

==== Rouh Rouhi ("The soul of my soul") ====
Karam's next album, "Rouh Rouhi", was released in 1999. The tracks "Ariftu Albi La Meen" ("Do you know who my heart belongs to?"), "Atchana" ("Thirsty"), and the title track, "Rouh Rouhi" ("Soul of my Soul"), were the major hits off the album, the latter two being shot as music videos. Many other songs succeeded, including "Kif Bdawik" ("How Do I Treat You?)", and "Ma Borda Ghayrak" ("I Don't Want Anyone But You").

=== 2000–2004 ===
In 2000, Karam released Oyoun Qalbi. This was a more romantic, reflective body of work compared to Karam's previous albums. Its songs include "Majboura" ("I Have to"), which has a modern jazz influence, and the power ballads "Oyoun Qalbi" ("Sweetheart") and "Khaleek al Ard" ("Stay down to Earth"). A music video was made for the Najwa 2000 megamix, which contained samples from each song on the Oyoun Qalbi album. The album sold over 5 million copies.

In 2001, Karam released Nedmaneh. It sold over 4 million copies worldwide and is one of Karam's most acclaimed albums. This album followed the style of music first presented by Karam in Oyoun Qalbi, and further experimented with new styles and sounds. The success of Nedmaneh brought many awards, including a Murex d'Or for "Best Arabic Artist" award, and three awards from Karam's production company, Rotana: "Artist of the Year", "Album of the Year", and "Highest Selling Album".

An honouring assembly was held on 23 June 2001, where Karam was awarded for her achievements throughout her singing career and for the commercial success of Nedmaneh. The ceremony was held at the Venezia Hotel, Beirut, Lebanon. In attendance were the Lebanese Minister of Information, Ghazi Aridi, who was representing the President of the Lebanese Republic, Émile Lahoud, prominent singer Wadih el Safi, acclaimed composer Elias Rahbani, along with many journalists and reporters. During the night, Karam sang some of her most popular songs and was presented with numerous medals and trophies. The recording was released on a special edition CD (Live in Concert), along with a compilation CD of Najwa's hits from 1989 to 2000 titled The Very Best Of Najwa Karam.

Karam's 2002 album, Tahamouni, was far removed from the "easy-going" contemporary feel of Oyoun Qalbi and Nedmaneh. The album was intended to get back in touch with a more youthful audience from other Arab nations, who had taken less interest in Karam's music from the late 90s. This was shown through songs like "Tahamouni" ("They Accused Me") which included attempts at rapping, and "Ew'a Tekoun Ze'alt" ("I Hope You're Not Mad at Me)", which seemed to have a Western influence.

==== Saharni, (He Charmed Me) ====
In late 2002, Karam collaborated with Wadih el Safi on the duet “W Kberna” (“We Grow Old Together”), a song depicting a father–daughter relationship.

After “W Kberna,” Karam released her next album, Saharni (Charmed). The album utilized traditional Lebanese musical elements, including trumbakke and wind instruments. Saharni reached the top of the charts and produced several singles; even though there was a lack of video clips for the songs, the album came through on top of the charts and produced several major hits, including "Edhak Lil Dounya" ("Smile to the World") and the title track "Saharni" ("He Charmed Me").

Karam made a world tour to complement Saharni's success, taking in the Middle East and destinations such as France, the US, and Australia with Wadih el Safi. Her concert in Australia holds the record for the largest-ever recorded concert attendance of an Arabic artist as of May 2026. Karam was presented with many awards and achievements in 2003. These include "Highest Selling Album" from Rotana, an award for the "Best Singer of Traditional Lebanese Song" from the Lions Club, and "Song of the Year": Edhak Lil Donya from Sawt El Ghad, Australia. Around this time, the Australian government had noted Karam's positive impact on Australian and Lebanese relations. Australia has a large Lebanese diaspora and has noted its cultural impact and large following by the Lebanese Australian diaspora and the wider community. Due to this, Karam was given an honorary award from the Australian Government.

In 2003, Karam began work on a new single to be included in her upcoming album, titled Leish Mgharrab? (Why are you living abroad?). The song was about the hardships people face when leaving their home country for a better life. A music video (directed by Sa'aed el-Marouk) was also created, which would transform modern-day Beirut into a bleak and harsh wasteland in 2020. The original video—which also contained scenes of citizens protesting against the Lebanese government—was banned from being aired by the Lebanese Parliament. When the clip was edited, the music video was allowed to go on air.

After a few months, Karam had completed the rest of her new album, Shu Mghaira..!. Like Saharni, it was distinctly Lebanese, but modernized, with a reflective overtone. Najwa continued her many live appearances to promote the album, including a concert in Carthage, Tunisia, where she performed for thousands of fans. The tracks "Bi Hawak" ("In Your Love") and "Shu Mghaira" ("How You've Changed") were shot as an expensive dual video clip featuring special effects. It remained at the number 1 position for 6 weeks on the Rotana Top 20 Chart. The two songs were the most popular from the album, and Karam was voted "Female Artist of the Year" by Musicana.net, which was decided via a large-scale internet poll.

=== 2005–present ===
In the second quarter of 2005, Karam released a new single and video clip called Shu Jani, a contemporary pop song that incorporates traditional Lebanese instruments. The video was filmed in the Faraya ski resort in Lebanon by director Sa'aed el-Marouk. It was to be on her upcoming 2005 album. The timing of the new clip was criticized in some tabloids because it was released during the tense electoral season in Lebanon and the Cedar Revolution (Independence Intifada). These tabloids argued that it was disrespectful for Karam to release new material at such a time. Karam defended herself by putting the claim on her Saudi production company, Rotana, which she says fast-tracked the release against her wishes. Although there was some controversy surrounding Shu Jani, it fared well with the public.

Due to the prolonged situation in the Lebanon region, Karam's 2005 album was postponed from release in June to November 2005. However, Karam released another single in late July called "Bhebak Walaa," an upbeat, contemporary/traditional song. On September 6, 2005, Karam released the video for "Bhebak Walaa", directed by Salim el-Turk.

==== Kibir'el Hob (Love Just Got Greater) ====
In November 2005, an advertisement for Karam's new album, Kibir'el Hob (Love Just Got Greater), featured her hand upon a cloudy horizon, with parts added to the picture until, on 30 November 2005, the "mystery lady" was revealed as Najwa Karam.

On the same day, Kibir'el Hob was released. The album was promoted through an elaborate advertising campaign, including billboard posters, television appearances on Dandana and Akeed Maestro, and music video clips for singles. Kibir'el Hob topped the highest-selling album chart in Lebanon for Rotana during the Christmas sales period and remained in the number one position through the New Year. In April 2006, Karam released a third and final single from the Kibir'el Hob album, accompanied by a video clip, and proved to be among the most popular Arabic songs of the year 2006.

In response to the 2006 Israel-Lebanon conflict, Karam collaborated with Lebanese singer and songwriter Melhem Barakat to record the song Rah Yebqa El Watan. The track, which Barakat wrote and composed, called for unity among all Lebanese people.

==== 2007–2008: Hayda Haki, (That's What I'm Talking About) & Aam Bimzah Maak, (I'm Kidding With You) ====
On May 28, 200, Sawt el Ghad and several other Arab radio stations began to play the new hit "Hayda Haki".

On June 6, 2007, the company Rotana released Najwa's 16th album, titled Hayda Haki. It included 8 songs with different kinds of styles, including Law ma btekzob in an older 90s style, and Ana Rouh and Nawer Eyami as romance songs. Hayda Haki was the next song (after her 2006–2007 hit Shu Hal Hala) that Najwa Karam shot as a video clip with Lebanese director Said el Marouk.

From the first week of the release of Hayda Haki, it became the best-selling album in Lebanon, the UAE, and Kuwait. The album achieved success in its first week of release in Lebanon, the Gulf, Libya, Syria, Jordan, and other Arab countries.

On June 29, 2007, Najwa Karam appeared as a guest on the show Album on MBC 1. She also released a romantic video clip Hayda Haki. On its first day on the charts, it landed in first place.

Najwa Karam toured the United States and Canada with Lebanese Stars Wael Kfoury and Fadel Shaker. The tour lasted for a little more than a month as they visited major cities.

After four days, Karam released a video clip for "Law Ma Btekzob" directed by Fadi Haddad.

Karam appeared on the TV show Al Arab (Final), hosted by Nishan, which aired on May 31. She sang a medley of her old and newsongs and added songs for Fairuz, Sabah, Wadih El Safi, and Samira Tawfiq. She also sang one of her old mawwal "Wainak Ya Ra3i Deni" (Where are you God?) aka "Mawal El Adyan".

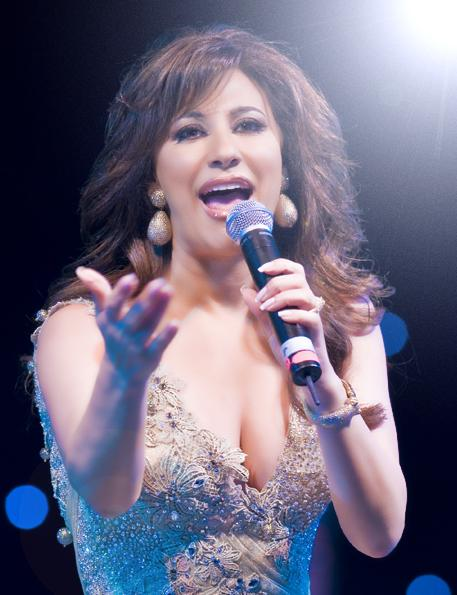
Karam in December 2008

On July 17, 2008, Rotana released Karam's 17th studio album, Am Bimzah Maak (I'm Joking With You). The album contained eight songs, including "Kammil 3ala Rouhi" and "Gatalna El Khof", composed by Melhem Baraket. The album stayed for three months #1 in Virgin Mega Store Lebanon, 4 weeks #1 in the UAE Virgin Mega Store and 8 weeks in Saudi Arabia. Rotana, Karam's production company, said that Najwa Karam's last album, Am Bimzah Maak, was one of the top 3 best-selling (Rotana) albums in the Middle East. It was chosen by Virgin MegaStore Jordan as the Top 3 most selling albums in 2008.

Karam released her second video clip from her latest album "Ma Bkhabi Aleyk" where she collaborated with Lebanese young director Randa Aalam.

Karam shot a 3rd video clip from Aam Bimzah Maak for the song "Taa Taa Khabik".

==== 2009: Khallini Shoufak, (Let Me See You) ====
In February 2009, Karam attended Hala Febrayer 09 in Kuwait. She performed a mixture of old and new songs.

On March 9, 2009, specifically on Mother's Day, Najwa Karam released her single "El Deni Em" (A mother is a whole world), which received commercial success and stayed #1 for three weeks on the online magazine "Elaph".

In May 2009, Najwa Karam travelled to Morocco to perform at the Mawazine Festival 2009. Her opening performance attracted a crowd exceeding 90,000.

On June 10, 2009, Rotana released Karam's 18th album, Khallini Shoufak (Let Me See You). The album contains eight songs, each with a different musical style. Along with the lead single, "Khallini Shufak", three additional songs received commercial success: "Eidak" (Your Hand), "Allah Yesghello Balo" (May God Make Him Worry), and "Aboos Eynak" (Kiss Your Eye). The album is considered Karam's strongest return to her original style since Saharny (2003). Karam said, "It's full of folkloric, balady songs, similar to Saharny and her 90s releases". Her video for "Khallini Shoufak" was released around the same time as the CD.

Karam was a guest performer on Star Academy 6's (Lebanon) final prime. She sang "Am Bemzah Ma'ak" (I'm joking with you), "Ta'a Khabeek" (Let me hide you), and her latest single, "Khallini Shoufak" (Let Me See You). She then appeared on Layali El Samar on 25 March 2010 on ABU DHABI TV. Karam also appeared on Taratata, Dubai TV, and soon after, Akher Man Ya3lam.

==== 2010: Bil Rou7, Bil Dam (in the soul, in the blood) & Lashhad Hobbak (I’ll beg your love) ====
On May 10, 2010, Sawt El Ghad Radio, Beirut, started playing Karam's new song "Bil Rou7, Bil Dam" (with our soul, with our blood). The new hit single was the first song of Karam's that was produced directly out of Rotana in 17 years. The music video featured the Guinness World Record's largest plate of tabbouleh, sponsored by Karam.

On November 11, 2010, Karam released her next single, "Lashhad Hobbak" (I'll Beg for Your Love). Karam wore a beaded spiderweb bodysuit, designed by Lebanese designer Zuhair Murad. It was later worn by Jennifer Lopez in her music video "On the Floor".

In late 2010, although there were doubts about a new contract between Karam and Rotana Production Company, after several meetings with Salem El Hendi, Karam agreed to return to Rotana. Haifa Wehbe attended the dinner party held after the press conference, telling the press that she was glad to accept Karam's invitation and delighted to be part of the celebration.

After Karam decided to postpone her upcoming album, the song "Wayn" was release without permission on the internet. The song was recorded three years prior in 2009 and was removed from that year's album, Khallini Shoufak. Although illegally released, the song was well-liked and was played on numerous radio stations.

==== 2011: Hal Leile...MaFi Noum (Tonight, There's No Sleep) ====
On June 28, 2011, Rotana released Hal Leile...MaFi Noum (Tonight...There's No Sleep), Najwa Karam's 19th album. "MaFi Noum (There's No Sleep)" and "Shu Hal Leile (What a Night)" were both released as singles before the album's release, while "Law Bas Taaraf" (If You'd Only Know) was released as the third and final single. Three days following its release, the album reached the top spot on Virgin Megastore Charts, replacing Nawal Al Zoghbi's album, Ma'rafsh Leh, which had been number one on the Lebanese charts for five months. Karam is credited as the writer of three of the songs appearing on the album: "Mafi Noum", "Shu Hal Leile", and "Eainy Bi Eainak". The title track and lead single "MaFi Noum" employs innovative "Doum Tac" Derbake notes as a part of its chorus. Karam reiterated in interviews the meaning and significance of the "Doum Tac" music notes and her reasoning behind their usage. It has since become a signature label of Najwa Karam's music.

Two weeks after the album's debut, a 3D music video was released for the title track, "Ma Fi Noum". The music video was produced by two professional teams from the US and the UK in collaboration with the Lebanese W&P Production Group. Directed by Waleed Nassif, the video was created by Sony and produced by Rotana. The video's opening sequence features Season 1 Arabs' Got Talent contestant, Abdelmalek Al Baljani, from Morocco, in a break dance solo. During his appearance on Arab's Got Talent, Karam was impressed by Al Baljani's abilities and promised on Live TV to cast him in her next video. The 3D music video premiered at the ABC Achrafieh theater in Lebanon on 25 July 2011 and was played in 600 3D Sony showrooms and outlets throughout the Arab world. A 2D version was also released for Television and YouTube. The "MaFi Noum" 3D clip had one of the largest production budgets in the Middle East.

In 2011, Karam debuted as a judge on the television series Arabs Got Talent, serving for six seasons.

==== 2017: Menni Elak (From Me, To You) ====
Karam's latest album, Menni Elak, was ranked among the Top 4 on iTunes worldwide, and top 1 for five weeks in the Middle East and Arabian countries. It was also ranked top 1 for six months in Virgin Megastore in Lebanon and broke the list of the 100 best albums on iTunes Brazil. Menni Elak ranked the top 1 on the Chinese website "Pan European Music". Following the album's release, Karam was listed among the most listened-to singers on Yotta Radio in Japan and appeared on the cover of the Malaysian magazine Akshak.

On the Amazon World Music site, the album hit the list of the best-selling albums in German, American, and British versions. On June 21st and 25th, the songs of the album were broadcast as the first Arabic album on the international British Radio station "FM 1 FM" in London, following a poll on Twitter. The song "Ah min el Gharam" from the album was nominated for the 2017 XLIII Universal Music Award in Spain, while "Habibi Min" got fifth place in the voting finals that lasted more than eight months. All eight album songs were entered in the list of "The Hot 100 songs" on Fazboard Iran. After eleven months, "Habibi Min", another song from the album, was ranked number one on iTunes Uzbekistan.

In 2017, she placed fifth on Forbes' list of "The Top 100 Arab Celebrities", released numerous singles and music videos, and released a studio album "Menni Elak".

==== 2018 ====
In 2018, Cosmopolitan included her in its list of "The 15 Most Inspiring Women In The Middle East", and Forbes named her one of the "Top 10 Arab Stars On The Global Stage." In 2021, she was featured in Forbes Middle East's Arab Music Stars list of MENA's 50 most-streamed and followed active musicians.

==== 2020 ====
In 2020, she served as a coach on the first season of MBC's The Voice Senior.

In 2025, she released an album called Halet tawari, it contains 9 songs.

In 2026, she released two singles called Shta'tellak and Tak Tak.

== Personal life ==
In June 2024, Karam publicly announced her marriage to Omar Al-Dahmani, an Emirati businessman.

== Discography ==
=== Studio albums ===
- 1989: Ya Habayeb
- 1992: Shams el-Ghinnieh
- 1993: Ana Ma'akon
- 1994: Naghmet Hob
- 1995: Ma Bassmahlak
- 1996: Hazi Helo
- 1997: Ma Hada La Hada
- 1998: Maghroumeh
- 1999: Rouh Rouhi
- 2000: Oyoun Qalbi
- 2001: Nedmaneh
- 2002: Tahamouni
- 2003: Saharni
- 2004: Shu Mghaira..!
- 2005: Kibir'el Hob
- 2007: Hayda Haki
- 2008: Am Bemzah Ma'ak
- 2009: Khallini Shoufak
- 2011: Hal Layle... Ma Fi Nom
- 2017: Menni Elak
- 2023: Karizma
- 2025: Halet Tawari'

=== Singles ===
- 1987: A'ala Zahle Wasselni
- 1987: A'al A'alali
- 1987: Ya Ghawi
- 1987: Batalet Soum W Salli
- 1987: El Watan El Ghali
- 1987: Largueslo bl Seif
- 1989: El Layl Sar Nhar
- 1989: El Raqm El Saa'ab
- 1996: Jayi Ya Jarash Jayi
- 1997: Aezzik Dayem Ya Carthage
- 1998: A Droub El Sham
- 2000: Ana Jayi Men Kfarhabbayt
- 2002: W Kberna (feat. Wadih El Safi)
- 2004: Kwaiti Aarabi
- 2005: Shu Jani
- 2006: Rah7 Yebqa El Watan (feat. Melhem Barakat)
- 2007: Bel San'a (feat. Melhem Barakat)
- 2007: Hayda Haki (Rotana Remix)
- 2007: Oter El Majd
- 2010: Bil Rouh Bil Dam
- 2010: Lashhad Hobbak
- 2011: Wayn (Leaked Single)
- 2012: Isroj Bel Layl Hsanak
- 2013: Ykhallili Albak
- 2014: Aal Sakhra
- 2014: Ya Yomma
- 2015: Kelmit Haa'
- 2015: Ma Bestaghreb (Song for Morocco)
- 2015: Siid L Rijaal
- 2015: Bawsit Abel alNawm
- 2016: Deni Ya Dana
- 2016: Yekhreb Baytak
- 2017: Yenaad Aalayk (‘’Menni Elak’’ Bonus Track Single)
- 2017: Nehna Chaabak Ya Allah
- 2018: YaHo (feat. Adel el Iraqi)
- 2018: El Layli Laylitna
- 2019: Allah Yekhod Biyadik (Song For Saudi Arabia)
- 2019: Mal3oun Abu El Isheg
- 2019: Ktir Helou
- 2019: Be3alle2 Mashna2to
- 2019: Ba3cha2 Tafasilak
- 2020: Beirut
- 2020: Maazour Albi
- 2020: Zayed Majedha
- 2021: Maghroumi 2
- 2021: Saher Ouloub
- 2022: Helwe El Denye
- 2022: Saaa Bayda
- 2026: Ma Fi Noum ( DJ Peter GL Remix)

=== Compilations ===
- 2001: The Very Best of Najwa Karam
- 2006: Greatest Hits
- 2016: Best of Najwa 2016

=== Live recordings ===
- 2001: Live in Concert

== Festivals and international concerts ==
During her career Najwa Karam has performed hundreds of concerts worldwide:

- 1991: Damascus International Fair – Syria
- 1991: Al Bustan Palace (Opera House)- Sultanate of Oman
- 1992: International Festival of Carthage – Tunisia
- 1992: Damascus International Festivals – Syria
- 1993: Cobo Arena Detroit (Cobo Center) -USA (Over 11000 people)
- 1993: Amphitheatre of El Jem – Tunisia (2 Concerts)
- 1993: Festival international de Monastir – Tunisia
- 1993: Benlton International Club – Lebanon
- 1994: Khalifa International Tennis and Squash Complex – Qatar
- 1994: Al Assad Sports City Stadium (Al-Assad Stadium) – Syria (Over 40000 people)
- 1994: Benlton International Club – Lebanon
- 1994: Ritz Theatre & Performing Arts Center New Jersey – USA
- 1995: Palais des congrès de Paris – France
- 1995: Fuheis Festivals – Jordan
- 1995: Sarafand Square – Lebanon (More Than 20000 People)
- 1995: Palais Des Festivals Cannes – France
- 1995: Damascus International Fair – Syria
- 1995: Damascus International Festivals – Syria
- 1995: Aley Amphitheatre – Lebanon
- 1995: Benlton International Club – Lebanon
- 1995: Baabda Amphitheatre – Lebanon
- 1995: Art Theatre Long Beach California – USA
- 1996: Capitol Theater Düsseldorf – Germany
- 1996: Jerash International Festivals – Jordan (3 Concerts)
- 1996: Cairo International Convention Centre – Egypt
- 1996: Bahrain International Circuit
- 1996: Royal Albert Hall London – UK
- 1997: People's Hall, Tripoli – Libya
- 1997: International Festival of Carthage – Tunisia (2 Concerts)
- 1997: Aley Amphitheatre – Lebanon
- 1997: Beirut Shopping Festivals – Lebanon
- 1997: Qurum Amphitheater Muscat – sultanate of Oman
- 1998: International Festival of Carthage – Tunisia
- 1998: Al Shaab Stadium – Iraq
- 1998: Al Forusiyah National Club – Iraq
- 1998: Al-Jalaa Stadium – Syria
- 1998: Damascus International Festivals – Syria
- 1998: Zahle City Amphitheatre – Lebanon
- 1998: Aley Amphitheatre – Lebanon
- 1998: Marina Amphitheatre – Egypt
- 1998: Cultural Palace Theatre – Jordan
- 1999: Damascus International Fair – Syria
- 1999: Damascus International Festivals
- 1999: Fayhaa International Stadium – Syria
- 1999: Umayyad Square – Syria (Over 100000 people)
- 1999: Bahrain International Exhibition Convention Centre
- 1999: The Carousel Theater Massachusetts – USA
- 1999: Circus Maximus Theatre Philadelphia – USA
- 1999: Abusta Square Tripoli – Libya
- 2000: International Festival of Carthage – Tunisia (2 Concerts)
- 2000: Amphitheatre Sidi Mansour Sfax – Tunisia (16000 people)
- 2000: Sousse Amphitheatre – Tunisia
- 2000: Bizerte Amphitheatre – Tunisia (130000 people)
- 2000: Festival international de Monastir – Tunisia
- 2001: Dubai World Trade Centre – UAE
- 2001: Arena Theatre Amman – Jordan
- 2001: Hala February Festivals – Kuwait
- 2001: Casino Du Liban Salle Des Ambassadeurs – Lebanon
- 2001: Timgad International Festivals – Algeria
- 2001: Doha International Festivals – Qatar
- 2001: Sidi Ferj Amphitheatre Kazif – Algeria
- 2001: Abusta Square Tripoli – Libya (2 Concerts)
- 2001: Al Abbasiyyin Stadium – Syria (Over 50000 people)
- 2002: The foot of Egyptians Pyramids – Egypt
- 2002: Creek Park Amphitheatre Dubai – UAE
- 2003: Star Square Beirut – Lebanon (Over 30000 people)
- 2003: Jerash International Festivals – Jordan (2 Concerts)
- 2003: Tyre International Festivals – Lebanon
- 2004: International Festival of Carthage – Tunisia
- 2004: Bizerte Amphitheatre – Tunisia
- 2004: Damascus International Fair – Syria
- 2004: Bahrain International Circuit
- 2004: Hala February Festivals – Kuwait
- 2004: Amphitheatre Sidi Mansour Sfax – Tunisia
- 2004: Zahle City Amphitheatre – Lebanon
- 2004: Palais Des Festivals Cannes – France
- 2005: El Menzah Sports Palace – Tunisia (2 Concerts)
- 2005: Zouk Mikael Amphitheatre – Lebanon
- 2006: Cultural Palace Theatre – Jordan
- 2006: Royal Cultural Center – Jordan
- 2006: Sabratha Amphitheatre – Libya
- 2006: Royal Albert Hall London – UK
- 2006: Festival international de Monastir – Tunisia
- 2006: Festival international de Gafsa – Tunisia
- 2006: Amphitheatre Sidi Mansour Sfax – Tunisia
- 2006: Timgad International Festivals – Algeria
- 2006: Sidi Ferj Amphitheatre Kazif – Algeria
- 2007: Boch Center Shubert Theatre Boston – USA
- 2007: Jerash International Festivals – Jordan
- 2007: Sydney Olympic Park – Australia
- 2007: Fox Theatre Detroit – USA
- 2007: Hala February Festivals – Kuwait
- 2007: Doha International Festivals
- 2007: Ritz Theatre & Performing Arts Center New Jersey – USA
- 2008: International Festival of Carthage – Tunisia
- 2008: Amphitheatre Sidi Mansour Sfax – Tunisia
- 2008: Bizerte Amphitheatre – Tunisia
- 2008: Jableh Roman Amphitheatre – Syria
- 2008: Bahrain International Circuit
- 2008: Casino Du Liban Salle Des Ambassadeurs – Lebanon
- 2008: Emirates Palace Abu Dhabi – UAE
- 2008: Tempodrom Berlin – Germany
- 2008: Ericsson Globe Arena Stockholm – Sweden (Over 11.000 People)
- 2008: Dubai International Film Festival – UAE
- 2009: Sidi Ferj Amphitheatre Kazif – Algeria
- 2009: Timgad International Festivals – Algeria
- 2009: Hala February Festivals – Kuwait
- 2009: Mawazine International Festivals – Morocco (Over 90000 people)
- 2009: Jableh Roman Amphitheatre – Syria
- 2009: Beirut Forum – Lebanon
- 2009: Damascus International Fair
- 2009: Al Dhafra Theater Dubai – UAE
- 2009: Rashid Karami Cultural Center Tripoli – Lebanon
- 2010: Byblos International Festival – Lebanon
- 2010: Damascus International Fair – Syria
- 2010: Doha International Festivals – Qatar
- 2010: Abu Dhabi National Exhibition Centre – UAE
- 2010: Tadmor International Festivals – Syria
- 2011: Jerash International Festivals – Jordan
- 2011: Hope Square Agadir – Morocco (Over 120000 People)
- 2011: Sidi Ferj Amphitheatre Kazif – Algeria
- 2011: Timgad International Festivals – Algeria
- 2011: The Corniche Abu Dhabi – UAE (Over 50000 People)
- 2011: Zahle City Amphitheatre – Lebanon
- 2011: Casino Du Liban Salle Des Ambassadeurs – Lebanon
- 2011: State Theater Tetouan – Morocco (Over 40000 People)
- 2011: Sound Board Theater Detroit – USA
- 2012: Hosny Chakroun Theatre Wahran – Algeria
- 2012: International Festival of Carthage – Tunisia
- 2012: Cannes Film Festivals – France (First Arabic Singer Ever participate to this Festival)
- 2012: Stipes Tower Amphitheater – UAE
- 2013: Jerash International Festivals – Jordan
- 2013: Mawazine International Festivals – Morocco (The most popular Female Arabic Singer concert with over 180000 people)
- 2013: Sidi Ferj Amphitheatre Kazif – Algeria
- 2013: Timgad International Festivals – Algeria
- 2013: Casablanca International Festivals – Morocco(Over 150000 People)
- 2013: Sporting Monte-Carlo – France
- 2014: Sidi Ferj Amphitheatre Kazif – Algeria
- 2014: Djemila International Festivals – Algeria
- 2014: Hala February Festivals – Kuwait
- 2014: Palais de la culture d'Abidjan – Ivory Coast
- 2014: Jerash International Festivals – Jordan
- 2014: Al Madina History Theatre – Lebanon
- 2014: The Fillmore Theatre Detroit – USA
- 2015: State Theater Tetouan – Morocco (Over 60000 people)
- 2015: Hala February Festivals – Kuwait
- 2015: Dubai Media City Amphitheatre – UAE
- 2015: Caesars Palace Atlantic City – USA
- 2015: Bahrain International Circuit
- 2015: Cedars International Festival – Lebanon
- 2015: Biel Beirut Holidays – Lebanon
- 2016: Jerash International Festivals – Jordan
- 2016: Zenith Arena Constantine – Algeria
- 2016: International Festival of Carthage – Tunisia
- 2016: Amphitheatre Sidi Mansour Sfax – Tunisia
- 2016: Sousse Amphitheatre – Tunisia
- 2016: Hosny Chakroun Theatre Wahran – Algeria
- 2016: Timgad International Festivals – Algeria
- 2016: Sidi Ferj Amphitheatre Kazif – Algeria
- 2016: Leverkuzen Arena – Germany
- 2016: Palais 12 Brussels – Belgium
- 2016: Gothenburg Square – Sweden (Over 45000 People)
- 2016: du Arena and Forum – Yas Island UAE
- 2017: Djemila International Festivals – Algeria
- 2017: Sydney Olympic Park – Australia
- 2017: Abdali Boulevard Square Amman – Jordan
- 2017: Mawazine International Festivals – Morocco (Over 100000 people)
- 2017: Bahrain International Circuit
- 2017: Cedars International Festival – Lebanon
- 2017: Olympia Hall Paris – France
- 2017: Melbourne Convention Centre – Australia
- 2017: Al Marooj Theatre Salala – Oman
- 2017: Beverly Hills California – USA
- 2017: Falaysi Theatre Algiers – Algeria
- 2017: Zenith Arena Constantine – Algeria
- 2018: Park Theatre Monte Carlo Las Vegas – USA
- 2018: Oak Ville The Meeting House Toronto – Canada
- 2018: ST. Denis Theatre Montreal – Canada
- 2018: Kuwait Opera House
- 2018: Al Majaz Amphitheatre Sharjah – UAE
- 2018: The Main Cultural Stage, Global Village Dubai – UAE
- 2018: Palais des congrès de Paris – France
- 2018: Casino Du Liban Salle Des Ambassadeurs – Lebanon
- 2018: Stockholm Waterfront Congress Centre – Sweden
- 2019: Kuwait Opera House
- 2019: Green Hall Khobar – Saudi Arabia
- 2019: Ayva Center Huston – USA
- 2019: Atlantis Theatre – The Bahamas
- 2019: Glendale Renaissance Hall Arizona – USA
- 2019: Mawazine International Festivals – Morocco (Over 100.0000 people)
- 2019: Talal Maddah Theatre – Saudi Arabia (The first Arab singer to sing "Tallah Madah" stage)
- 2019: Fuheis Festivals – Jordan
- 2019: Boulevard Stage Riyadh – Saudi Arabia
- 2019: Royal Opera House Muscat – Oman (2 Concerts)
- 2020: Al Hamra International Exhibition & Conference Center – UAE

== Awards and honours ==
Over a multi-decade career, Karam has received competitive music awards, brand appointments, and civic or press recognitions across the Arab world.

=== Selected awards and recognition ===
Year	Awarded by	Category	Notes
2001	Murex d'Or	Best Arab Artist	Recognised following the commercial success of Nedmaneh; contemporaneous career summary notes the Murex win alongside Rotana honours for Artist/Album/Highest-selling of the year.
2012	L’Oréal Paris (Middle East)	Brand ambassador (appointment)	Announced as L’Oréal’s first Arab spokesperson; appearances included the Cannes Film Festival red carpet that year.
2017	Forbes Middle East	Top 100 Arab Celebrities	Ranked #5 on the inaugural list.
2018	Cosmopolitan Middle East	“Inspiring women” list	Named among “the most inspiring women in the Middle East.”
2021	Forbes Middle East	Arab Music Stars	Included on the annual list of 50 most-streamed/followed Arab music acts.
2023	Forbes	50 Over 50: Europe, Middle East & Africa	Selected honoree on the regional list spotlighting women leaders over 50.

=== Notable festival appearances (achievement) ===
While not awards, headlining placements at heritage festivals are frequently cited in coverage of Karam’s career.

Year	Festival	Location	Notes
2023	Jerash Festival of Culture and Arts	Jerash, Jordan	Listed as a headlining performer in the official programme that year.

=== Civic honours ===
- Reports in 2011–2016 stated that the Municipality of Zahlé dedicated a street in Karam’s honour; however, later local reporting suggested no formal street naming had taken place as of 2019.

==== Further reading ====
- "Najwa Karam: The Sun That Never Sets". Roovet Stories.

== See also ==
- Music of Lebanon
- Music of Egypt
