= Nooriyah =

Saudi-born British DJ, producer and curator

- Born: Nooriyah Qais; Saudi Arabia
- Genres: Electronic; club; global bass
- Occupations: DJ; producer; curator; radio presenter; writer
- Years active: 2010s–present
- Website: nooriyah.com

Nooriyah (also credited as Nooriyah Qais) is a Saudi-born, UK-based DJ, producer, curator and radio presenter. She is known for incorporating music from the South-West Asian and North African (SWANA) region into electronic and club music contexts.

She is the founder of the London-based music platform and event series Middle of Nowhere, which focuses on SWANA artists and sounds and has been featured by Boiler Room and Resident Advisor.

== Early life and education ==
Nooriyah was born in Saudi Arabia and later lived in Japan before settling in the United Kingdom.

She later completed a master’s degree in public health at Imperial College London, with research addressing child nutrition in conflict zones.

== Career ==
=== Radio and audio production ===
Nooriyah first developed her public profile through radio before focusing more fully on DJing and live performance. She is listed as a presenter by Rinse FM.

In 2022, she was credited as the producer of the BBC Radio 4 documentary A Little Flat: The Music Our Ears Overlook.

=== DJing and performances ===
Nooriyah’s DJ sets have been described as drawing on SWANA rhythms alongside UK club music lineages and contemporary electronic styles.

In December 2022, Boiler Room streamed Boiler Room London: Middle of Nowhere, which included a recorded DJ set by Nooriyah.

She has appeared at festivals and events including Glastonbury Festival, where the 2023 programme listed “Nooriyah Presents Middle of Nowhere”.

In 2025, Nooriyah was included in press coverage of the Do LaB stage line-ups at the Coachella Valley Music and Arts Festival.

Resident Advisor has published a podcast mix credited to Nooriyah and maintains an artist profile for her.

=== Middle of Nowhere ===
Middle of Nowhere was founded by Nooriyah as a platform and event series centred on SWANA artists and sounds, highlighting regional musical forms within club culture.

== Selected works ==
=== DJ mixes and broadcasts ===
- Boiler Room London: Middle of Nowhere (Boiler Room set)
- RA.1002 Nooriyah (Resident Advisor podcast mix)
