= Laila Ghofran =

Moroccan-Egyptian singer (born 1961)

Laila Ghofran ليلى غفران
- Born: Jamila Omar Bouamout; 19 March 1961 (age 65); El Jadida, Morocco
- Genres: Arabic pop; taarab
- Occupation: Singer
- Years active: 1981–present
- Labels: Alam El Phan; Rotana; independent

Jamila Omar Bouamout (Arabic: جميلة بو عمرت; born 19 March 1961), better known as Laila Ghofran (ليلى غفران; also Laila Ghofrane, Layla Ghofran), is a Moroccan-Egyptian singer who started her career in the music industry in the 80s and broke through in the early 90s. To the people in the Arab world, she's called as the "Sultana of Taarab" due to her strong and sensational voice and her popular covers of classic Arabic songs.

Ghofran is considered one of the best-selling Moroccan female artists of all time thanks to her undisputed commercial success in the 90s.

== Career ==
=== 1980s ===
Ghofran's career began in the 1980s but really picked up between 1988 and 1998, elevating her to the status of Arab diva, in part due to the work of her then-husband and manager Ibrahim Aakad.

Ghofran left to Paris and London due to her family's rejection of her interest in pursuing a career in music, and started singing for Arab communities in hotels and restaurants. She released her first song in Moroccan Arabic, titled "El Youm El Awel" in 1982, which was well-received in Morocco.

Out of fear of her father and in order to protect her family, she took the name "Laila Ghofran" to be her stage name before she officially kicked off her career as a singer.

=== 1990s ===
Between 1989 and 2000, Laila Ghofran experienced the definitive golden era of her music career, transitioning from a rising artist into one of the Arab world's dominant pop divas.

In 1989, Ghofran kicked off her mainstream recording career with her first official studio album, Eyounak Amary. Managed by her then-husband Ibrahim Aakad, the album introduced her to Egyptian and pan-Arab audiences with hit singles like "Awraqi El Adima" ("My Old Papers") and "Ana Mesh Nadmana".

She achieved massive commercial and critical breakthrough with her second album, Ya Farha Helly in 1990. The record featured her iconic career-making track "Law Hata Hayerfodny El Alam" ("Even If the World Rejects Me"), which solidifed her presence on Arabic radio and television.

Ghofran maintained this momentum by releasing consecutive highly regarded albums, including Ana Asfa (1991) and Esaalo El Zorouf (1992). Tracks like "Bahibak, Bahibak" and the title song "Esaalo El Zorouf" became staple hits of the early '90s.

Expanding her artistic footprint, she released Kol Shea Momken (1993) followed by Haza Ekhtiary (1994), an album performed entirely in the Khaleeji (Gulf) dialect, proving her versatility across regional music styles.

Ghofran reached the absolute height of her 90s fame with the blockbuster album Jabar in late 1995. The title track was a masterclass cover of the legendary Abdel Halim Hafez song, driving massive cassette sales across the Middle East and cementing her status as an elite vocal powerhouse. The album was one of the best-selling album of the year in the Middle East, while her performances of “Jabar”, “Kamel El Awsaf” and “Hobbak Nar” remain widely appreciated.

Toward the end of the decade, she rounded out her peak period with the emotional albums Malameh (1997) and Saaet El Zaman (1999) via Rotana. By 2000, as the music industry rapidly pivoted from traditional cassette-tape melodies to modern, fast-paced digital pop music, Ghofran briefly scaled back her intense output before signing with major modern labels like Rotana and EMI Music Arabia in the early 2000s.

=== 2000s ===
Ghofran kicked off the decade by adapting to the slicker, fast-paced production style of modern Arabic pop. She released the album Aho Da El-Kalam ("That’s the Talk") via and Rotana in 2003, signaling a transition away from her classic 90s cassette-era identity.

In 2005, she achieved a massive career resurgence with her eleventh studio album, Akter Min Aey Waqit ("More Than Ever"). The album featured her modern signature song, "Ashalhalk". The single became a chart-topping hit across Arabic radio and music television networks.

Despite the overwhelming popularity of "Ashalhalk", disputes arose with her record label, Rotana, regarding the album's overall commercial performance and promotion, leading Ghofran to sever ties with the company shortly after.

In 2006, she decided to independently produce her own music and released a song titled "Men Hena Wa Rayeh", whose music video was directed by her then-husband, Anas Do'ya.

Ghofran announced that she would be experimenting different and new music genres in an album that she had prepared for release in 2008. However, after her daughter, Hiba al-Akkad, and her friend, were brutally murdered later that year, she put off the album and released it in June, 2009, with a song titled "El Garh Mn Naseeby," in dedication her late daughter. The album, whose title was the same, had moderate success amidst controversies accusing Ghofran of using her daughter's case to promote the album. It sold one million copies, with 100,000 sold only in Egypt.

In 2013, Ghofran officially closed out this decade of her career by partnering with the powerhouse Egyptian label Mazzika to release her 2013 album, Ahlamy. The project was a deliberate attempt to reclaim her footing in the contemporary music landscape, balancing her traditional vocal power with modern production. The album sold 68,000 copies before Ghofran took a break from the music scene.

Ghofran returned to the music scene with a single titled "Jabni L'ghram" in 2018.

=== 2020-present ===
In 2020, Ghofran intended to comeback to the music scene and thus recorded a song titled "Ya Masa' El Louz" and filmed a music video for it with director Mohammad Anees. However, due to the COVID-19 pandemic, the single was never released.

In 2023, she said in a TV interview that the reason behind her hiatus from music was because of her health, noting that she fails to express her anger. A few months later, she released a song titled "Ana Keda Agbany."

In 2024, Ghofran said that she would take a break from the music industry for personal reasons. However, she visited Lebanon in 2025 and held a conference during which she announced her return to music, promising fans to record new songs soon.

== Personal life ==
Ghofran was married five times and is the mother of two daughters.

In the early 80s, she married Egyptian producer Ibrahim Al-Akkad, with whom she had her late daughter, Hiba, before they separated. She then married Iraqi singer Fouad Masoud, with whom she had a daughter named Nagham. She later married businessmen Ismail Khurshid, Adham Mohammad and divorced them. In 2005, she married director Anas Do'ya, who was 15 years younger than her and divorced him in 2007. Ghofran married Murad Abu Al-Ainayn in 2008 and the couple got divorced in 2015.

=== The murder of Ghofran's daughter, Hiba Al Akkad ===
On November 27, 2008, Ghofran's daughter, Hiba, 23, and her Saudi friend, Nadine Khaled Gamal, were found by Nadine's fiance, stabbed in the latter's apartment in Al Nada complex in Sixth of October City's Sheikh Zayed district in a case that garnered media and public attention. Al Akkad's fiance, Ali Essam Al-Din, arrived at the scene of the crime after his dying fiance called him. He then reported the crime to the police and rushed his fiance to the hospital, where she later died.

Police said that the murderer was a blacksmith, who entered Gamal's apartment with the intention of stealing money. In 2010, Mahmoud Al Issawi was sentenced to death, and the capital punishments took place at the Wadi al-Natrun prison in 2014.

== Discography ==
=== Studio albums ===
- Eiounak Amary (1989)
- Ya Farha Helly (1990)
- Ana Asfa (1991)
- Esaalou Ezzorof (1992)
- Kol Shea Momken (1993)
- Haza Ekhtiary (1994)
- Jabar (1996)
- Malameh (1997)
- Saaet El Zaman (1999)
- Ahoda Al Klam (2003)
- Akter Min Aey Waqit (2005)
- El Garh Mn Nassiby (2009)
- Ahlamy (2013)

=== Compilation albums ===
- Laila Ghofran (1990)
- Best of Laila (2012)

=== Non-album singles ===
- El Youm El Awel (1982)
- Raseef Omory (unknown date)
- Ya Beladi (1994)
- El Helm El Arabi (1998)
- Ya Rab (2000)
- Ya Hager (2001)
- Min Hena Wa Rayeh (2006)
- Heya Di Masr (2009)
- Qades Arwahom (2011)
- El Shabab Da (2011)
- Berahmetak Aweny (2011)
- Tahet El Hakayek (2013)
- Bilad El Aman (2015)
- Enta Maykhtlefsh Aleek Etneen (2016)
- Aiz Te'ol Haga (2016)
- Jabni L'ghram (2018)
- Ana Keda Agbany (2023)
