= Ruwaida al-Mahrouqi =

Emirati artist from Abu Dhabi (born 1975)

Ruwaida al-Mahrouqi رويدا المحروقي
- Born: 8 June 1975 (age 51); Abu Dhabi, UAE
- Genre: Arabic music
- Years active: 1999–present
- Label: Rotana Records

Ruwaida al-Mahrouqi (Arabic: رويدا المحروقي; born 8 June 1975) is an Emirati artist from Abu Dhabi. She is signed to Rotana Records.

== Early life ==
Al-Mahrouqi was born to an Omani father and an Emirati mother. She studied at Rosary School in Abu Dhabi. Afterwards, she studied Television directing in the American University of Beirut, Lebanon.

== Career ==
Since she was young, she has been fascinated by the artistic world. At the age of 6 years old, she started learning to play the piano. Two years later, before she was even 8 years old, she participated in a contest. She won first place and got a gold award. Later on, for her college studies, Ruwaida chose to study audiovisual and theater directing. She enrolled at the American University of Lebanon. In 1996, she participated in the famous Lebanese TV show "Studio Al Fan".

The jury was impressed by her performance of the song of Fairuz "Aatini Annaya Wa Ghani". Indeed, her great talent and impressive vocal capacities allowed her to perform the song in a classical style. She was ranked second and won the silver medal for the "Tarab" category.

In 2002, she released her first album Akher Hob. Later on, she released two more albums consecutively entitled Aqolak Shey and Warrini. In 2008, she released the album Mohri Ghali which brought her more fame and success.

Along with her musical career, she also worked as a director in Abu Dhabi TV. She has also taken part in a 2013 television series entitled Do Re Mi.

== Discography ==
=== Albums ===
- 2002: Akher Hob (in Arabic آخر حب)
- 2004: Aqolak Shey (in Arabic أقولك شي)
- 2006: Warrini (in Arabic وريني)
- 2008: Mohri Ghali
- 2011: Ruwaida 2011 (in Arabic رويدا 2011)

== See also ==
- Mahira Abdel Aziz
