= Shaabi =

Egyptian musical style

Shaabi (Arabic: شعبي, romanized: šaʿbī, pronounced [ˈʃæʕbiː]; lit. 'of the people' or 'locally popular') is an Egyptian musical genre. It is a form of popular working-class music which evolved from Egyptian Baladi in the second half of the 20th century and the core of Egyptian popular music in streets, at weddings, and in everyday Egyptian life.

Shaabi originated in Cairo from the 1920s to the 1940s, as in certain songs and themes of composer Sayyid Darwish, and from the 1940s to 1960s by mawwal singers Abu Dira and Anwar al-Askari and in songs by Shafiq Gallal, Mohamed abd el-Motleb, Mohamed el-Ezzabi and others. One of the most famous and global Egyptian Shaabi songs is "Shik Shak Shok", a creation of the prominent Egyptian musician Hassan Abou El Seoud. It became also known outside of Egypt ever since the 1970s and even gained some global fame. It is considered as a form of the local urban music expressing the difficulties and frustrations of modern lower-class Egyptian life. Shaabi singers predating the 1970s often sang other genres, such as religious music, love songs, and even nationalist songs. As migration to the cities increased, certain neighborhoods were identified as shaabi, and the musicians were known in their own locales.

Shaabi lyrics can be both intensely political, and filled with humour and double entendre. Because of its nature as street music, and widespread indifference to copyright law among Egyptians, Shaabi today is mainly distributed on pirated tapes and CDs.

The first shaabi singer to rise to stardom was Adaweyah, whose first album in 1972 sold a million copies. Like many shaabi singers, Adaweyah was famed for his mawwal. More recently, Shaaban Abdel Rahim rose to fame in 2000 with the controversial "Ana Bakrah Israel" ("I hate Israel"), and has remained something of a working-class hero due to a string of populist political hits.

Other well-known singers in the shaabi genre include Saad El Soghayer, Amina, and Abdelbaset Hamouda. Another notable singer is Hakim, who is from a middle-class background unlike most shaabi singers, and whose commercially successful brand of shaabi-pop is generally cheerful and apolitical.

== Mahraganat ==
The most recent new development to come out of Cairo's Shaabi scene is mahraganat (Arabic: مهرجانات, lit. 'festivals') music, also known as "electro-shaabi" in the West. However the performers use mahraganat (meaning a big, loud, messy event; and a festival) to distinguish themselves from sha'bi.

The best-known artists in this genre are Felo, Oka Wi Ortega, Sadat, Figo, Alaa 50 Cent, Shehta Karika, and Islam Chipsy (although Chipsy does not associate him with mahraganat, as his music is more instrumental).
