= Mahraganat =

Genre of Egyptian electronic dance music

- Native name: مهرجانات, مهرجان, الكترو شعبي
- Other names: Egyptian Electro-shaabi / electro-sha3bi / electro-mahragan
- Stylistic origins: Traditional Egyptian music; Egyptian folk music; grime; trance music; reggaeton; hip hop; rock n roll
- Cultural origins: Early 2000s, Egypt
- Typical instruments: Maqsoum(Rhythm); Synthesizer; music sequencer; sampler; Digital audio workstation; Darbuka; Sagat; Drum kit

Mahragan or Mahraganat (Arabic: مهرجانات, pronounced [mɑhɾɑɡɑˈnɑːt]; transl. "festivals, carnivals"), also Egyptian electro, Egyptian street music or shaabi-electro, is a popular genre of Egyptian folk music. Mahraganat is a combination of working class popular Egyptian music (shaabi) played at weddings, EDM and hip-hop, with heavy autotune use. DJ Figo made the genre more well known with his team "set dyaba" released during the 2011 Egyptian Revolution. Although this may be the first ever track to go mainstream, Mahraganat was conceived early by several Egyptian underground artists as DJ Ahmed Figo, El Sadat, Feelo and Alaa Fifty in 2004. They shared their music via MP3 files and phones, and it could be heard playing everywhere in taxis, tuktuks and on the street, since Egyptian Shaabi music has always been considered as the true soul of Egypt, given how powerful it is. Another Mahragan mix was released by the same group of friends in 2006 and it was called "Mahragan Elsalam", named after their neighbourhood 'Elsalam' in northeastern Cairo, it talked about friendship and how to be mature.

== History ==
The origins of mahraganat (mahragan songs) lie in the popular (aka sha'bi or shaabi) neighborhoods and streets of Egypt. In 2006–7, wedding DJs began combining shaabi music and electronic dance music with influences from reggaeton, grime and rap. In 2011, the Revolution began and the genre reflected the political turmoil as DJ Figo, released his first big single entitled "Ana Baba, Y’lla" Initially, mahragan received no airplay on radio or television and spread online by means of such sites as YouTube and SoundCloud. Like mulid (a different sub-genre of sha'bi music) it is dance music, not meant for sitting and listening. Mahragan street performances inspire wild, sometimes acrobatic dancing, combining hip-hop moves with raqs baladi (Egyptian folk dancing). In 2014, mahragan DJ Souissy signed a record deal and artists such as EEK (which is purely music without lyrics) brought the genre to the mainstream in Egypt. By summer 2014, mahraganat had become popular throughout all of Egypt. Outside of Egypt, the genre was popularised by alternative culture magazine Audio Kultur and the Cairo Liberation Front. Dance music blog Generation Bass also helped introduce mahraganat to European audiences. In 2014, a group of mahragan DJs toured the Netherlands.

In 2015, Mahragan DJ Zola was shot and killed on the street during celebrations of the Egyptian Revolution's fifth anniversary. The government announced that opposition protesters where responsible for the shooting, while DJ Sadat held the police responsible.

The genre was considered vulgar by some older and more conservative Egyptians. This is because of the social status of the performers and fans, the controversial topics and style of lyrics, use of obscenities, and personal style of the mahragan fans. In 2016, Nagham FM radio station banned maharagan songs from its programs, citing that they did not "match Egyptian customs and traditions". However, television shows and music producers moved to cash in on the new trend, signing certain artists, such as Oka & Ortega, who have performed more widely since 2013 and recorded some commercials, and many hit songs.

On Valentine's Day 2020, a concert was held in Cairo Stadium featuring many stars, and Hassan Shakoush, a leading Mahraganat singer, was also invited to the concert alongside his Mahraganat co-singer, Omar Kamal, where they performed their superhit, Bent El-Geran (The Neighbor's Daughter). In light of this event, there was some momentum on social media criticizing what they called a lack of age appropriateness of parts of the lyrics such as using many Egyptian street slurs and slang words, which some other artists considered as deviation from Egyptian values. Moreover, criticisms were frequently referring to one other explicit line in their hit song stating "I drink alcohol and smoke Weed". However, the singers reacted by releasing a video where they claimed that what happened was an inadvertent mistake, and that they aren't advising youth to switch to alcoholism or get drunk. In the video, they apologized and explained that the wrong version was played even though another version had already been recorded where the explicit line was altered. Shortly after, the Egyptian union of musicians decided to ban Mahraganat music in Egypt and to deny Mahraganat singers their memberships, including actor and Mahraganat performer Mohamed Ramadan.

== Artists ==
Artists classified in this genre of music include:

- Oka Wi Ortega: This duo gained significant mainstream popularity, performing widely since 2013 and even featuring in commercials, becoming some of the first Mahraganat artists to cross over into traditional media. They are frequently listed among the genre's prominent contemporary artists.
- Madf3gya: Composed of Diesel, Shendy, Kanka (now known as Kan), and Dolsika, Madf3gya is notable for their contributions to Egyptian films and television series, including their hit song "Millionaire" for the popular series "B-100 Wesh".
- Hassan Shakoush & Omar Kamal: Their collaboration on "Bent El-Giran" (The Neighbour's Daughter) achieved unprecedented viral success, garnering hundreds of millions of views on YouTube (e.g., 660M+ on YouTube; also cited as 70M+, 120M+). This song became a landmark for the genre, despite simultaneously sparking significant controversy and leading to the Musicians' Syndicate's ban.
- Mohamed Ramadan: A well-known Egyptian actor and singer, Mohamed Ramadan has successfully integrated Mahraganat elements into his music. His tracks, such as "Mafia," have achieved massive viewership and frequently topped YouTube trends in the Middle East.
- Islam Chipsy (although Chipsy does not associate him with this genre, his music being more instrumental).
- Hamo Bika
- Fares Sokar
- Sadat
- Figo
- Alaa 50 Cent
- Shahta Karika
- Filo
- Double Zuksh
- Enaba
- Ameen Khattab
- Ahmed Moza
- Eslam Kabonga
- Essam Sasa
- Kaloosha
- Abo el Meeta
- Miso misara
- Mostafa Elgen
- Hady Elsoghayar
- Abo el Mogz
- Hamo Eltikh
- Hamo Elmorshedy

== In popular culture ==
In 2013, Hind Meddeb released a documentary about the Egyptian genre titled Electro Chaabi.

In April 2022, the second episode of the Marvel Cinematic Universe series Moon Knight features a song from the genre, "El Melouk - The Kings" by 3enba, Double Zuksh, and Ahmed Saad.
