= Ahmed Adaweyah =

Egyptian singer (1945–2024)

Ahmad Adawiyyah أحمد عدوية
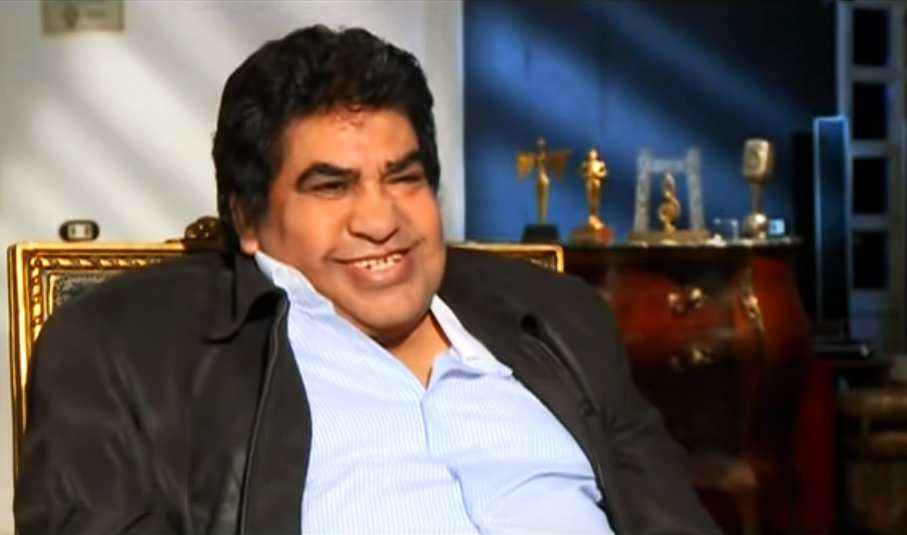
- Adawiyyah in 2014

Background information
- Born: 26 June 1945; Minya Governorate, Egypt
- Died: 29 December 2024 (aged 79) Cairo, Egypt
- Occupations: Singer, actor
- Years active: 1969–2024
- Spouse: Wanisa Ahmad (m. 1976; died 2024)

Ahmed Adaweyah (Arabic: أحمد عدوية; 26 June 1945 – 29 December 2024) was an Egyptian actor and singer of Sha'abi music. He also starred in 27 Egyptian films.

== Early life and career ==
Adaweyah was born on 26 June 1945 in Minya Governorate, Egypt, to a livestock dealer, and he lived with 14 siblings. He later moved to Cairo and started his career as a cafe waiter, while he also performed songs in Cairo in 1969, full of working class slang and double entendres. His recordings outsold many others and were circulated via audiocassette in the streets. Among them, "Salamit Ummih Hassan" referred to Egypt (as Umm Hassan) and its defeat in 1967; "Zahma ya Dunia, Zahma" lamented the crowded and hectic conditions in Cairo, "Ya Bint el-Sultan" became a favorite song performed for dancers. Like many Sha'abi singers, Adaweyah was capable of delivering a strong mawal (vocal improvisation). Despite the disapproval of the music establishment and the exclusion of his songs from television or radio, they became popular as they spread on audiocassettes. He advanced to singing in five-star hotels and the best nightclubs of the time. He also had some copyright issues with his song "essah eddah embo" with other performers.

In 1989, Adaweyah was drugged and attacked by a jealous Kuwaiti emir, Talal bin Nasser. Officials claimed that he was found comatose after an overdose of heroin administered by person(s) connected to the jealous husband. Adawiyya recovered sufficiently to sing again, although he was partially paralyzed. He has since appeared on various music programs. In 2009, he had a duet with Ramy Ayach, singing "Elnas Elray'a". In 2018, he released a new song "El Helw Wesel". meaning (The Sweet Reached) with Ukrainian dancer Alla Kushnir appearing in the music video for the song.

== Personal life and death ==
Adawuyyah married in 1976, he had a daughter, Warda, and a son, Mehammad, who was also a singer. His wife, Wanisa Ahmad, died in May 2024.

On 29 December 2024, Adaweyah died from a long illness in Cairo. He was 79.
