= Arabic pop =

Subgenre of pop music and Arabic music

Arabic pop music
- Stylistic origins: Arabic music; traditional pop; dance pop
- Cultural origins: 1970s, Arabic-speaking countries
- Typical instruments: Electric guitar; bass guitar; keyboard; synthesizer; turntables; drum machine; Roland TR-707; traditional Arabic instruments
- Derivative forms: Al Jeel; Khaleeji; Arabic R&B; Arabizi/A-pop

Arabic pop music or Arab pop music is a subgenre of pop music and Arabic music.

Arabic pop is mainly produced and originated in Cairo, Egypt; with Beirut, Lebanon, as a secondary center. It is an outgrowth of the Arabic film industry (mainly Egyptian movies), also predominantly located in Cairo. Since 2000, various locations in the Gulf countries have been producing Khaleeji pop music.

The primary style is a genre that synthetically combines pop melodies with elements of different Arabic regional styles, called ughniyah (Arabic: أغنية) or in English "Arabic song". It uses mainly Western instruments, including electric guitars or electronic keyboards, as well as traditional Middle Eastern instruments like the oud or darbukka.

Another characteristic aspect of Arabic pop is the overall tone and mood of the songs. The majority of the songs are in a minor key, and the lyrics tend to focus on longing, melancholy, strife, and generally love issues.

The popularization of Arabic pop was largely due to the emergence of music videos, and the broadcast channels they were broadcast on, in the late 1970s. This multimedia technology allowed the easier spread of new perspectives within Arabic music. This visualization of Arab pop was a result of wanting to attract larger audiences and broaden singers' reputations with their younger audiences which further spread Arabic pop music.

== Songwriting, recording and distribution formats ==
The road to Arab stardom is very different from the one in the Western world. Traditionally, a certain producer creates the full song from music to lyrics, no matter the talents of the performer. Most music is recorded in studios as is Western Pop music. But also several live albums have been popular, such as with Asalah and Egyptian legend Umm Kulthum.

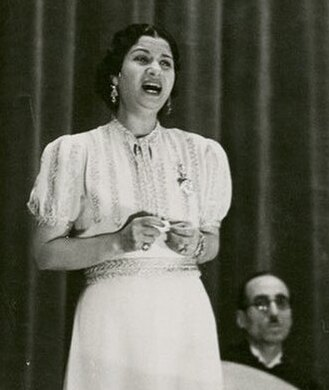
Umm Kulthum performing, with Mohamed El Qasabgi in the background

Music has been released as single records, later replaced with cassettes in the album format, and by the late 1990s, and 2000s, additionally on CDs. Singles were not released separately, but just airplay is common. By the mid 2010s, they have been increasingly released on streaming services which allowed singles to be released again as soon as they become available.

There are no official charts or certifications due to the informal nature of the business and bootlegging.

In the mid 2000s, Ringtone charts were occasionally made, but due to bootlegging, they were supposedly highly inaccurate. There are several awards in different countries awarded in different ways according to their organizations. In fact, bootlegging is so common that most bootleggers have their own brands. They are so bold that they usually put contact info on the front of the CDs. Bootlegging is such a major problem that most artists cannot rely on royalties for income. Most of the actual musical income came from ringtone downloads, which was more prevalent than in the West. Other income comes from endorsement deals and live performances.

Live performances are mainly brokered through the record label. This includes public concerts, such as at arenas or major media events. However, performances at weddings and private parties are common and well paid, no matter the artist's level of fame.

Music TV channels and music shows such as Arabs Got Talent are popular in the Middle East and North Africa, where some 40 Arab music channels exist. Rotana is the most popular company, running six TV channels, a record label, and a roster of more than 100 of the top Arab pop artists.

=== The business side ===
There are vast differences between the Western Music business and the Arabic Music business.

Unlike in the West, there are rarely managers, agents or PR systems. Record labels are usually mega corporations that control music videos, music channels, and distribution as well as the artists' careers, such as endorsement deals or booking gigs. Music videos generally are similar to videos in the Western world, often with a storyline and dance scenes. Producers, songwriters and composers are usually affiliated with certain labels. An aspiring Arab singer creates a video demo and sends them to satellite channels that specialize in that area. It is then up to a record label to see them on such a program and sign them.

By means of the Internet and social media, regional cooperation between Arab pop musicians, producers and studios has become more feasible than ever before. Thus, Arab pop or even underground musicians can reach their audiences across the region and beyond. Since the 2000s, there has been a rise in commodifying Arab popstars through brand deals. For example, Nancy Ajram was the official Coca-Cola representative in 2005 while Pepsi saw shifts between Nawal Al Zoghbi in 2001, Elissa in 2003, and Haifa in 2005. Some criticize this commercialization of Arab pop as a removal of culture from its traditional roots and thus becoming emotion and meaningless.

== Artistic expression and public response ==
Most Arab pop concentrates on romantic themes, hence the frequent use of words like habibi (my darling) and qalbi (my sweetheart). Explicit references to sexuality and topics forbidden by Islam, including alcohol, are rare. So is the overt mention of politics, reflecting the limited democratic rights in the region, but international conflicts such as the Gulf War sometimes inspire songs such as "Saddam Saddam", a 1991 hit in support of Saddam Hussein.

Arab pop music videos are most popular among local youth in the Levant and North Africa. The Gulf countries are well-known to ban or censor music videos they deem inappropriate. Lebanon, Jordan, Syria, Tunisia, and Morocco show the least tendency to censor or ban music videos, while Egypt has been known to ban overtly sexual and explicit music videos. Specifically, Lebanon is considered more culturally liberal than other Arab countries and observed to see how Western musical trends will be received by the larger Arab society.

Although tame by Western standards, female Arab popstars have been known to cause controversy with their sexuality. Playful lyrics, skimpy costumes, and dancing have led to quite a bit of criticism in the more conservative Islamic circles. Artists such as Samira Said, Nancy Ajram, Nawal El Zoghbi, Latifa, Assala, Amal Hijazi, Elissa and Haifa Wehbe have all come under fire at one time or another for the use of sexual innuendos in their music. This has led to bans on their music and performances in certain countries; particularly in Haifa's case. In 2002, a video by Samira Said called "Youm Wara Youm" was banned by the Egyptian Parliament for being 'too sexy', similar to Nancy Ajram's music video "Akhasmak Ah". In addition Amal Hijazi's music video of "Baya al Ward" was heavily criticised and banned on a few music channels. Such extremes are rare, but such kinds of censorship are not uncommon for Arab female popstars.

Arab pop music videos encompass vast themes and takes on a pluralist nature - it can represent Arab identity, the state, and/or religious identities or none of these and focus more on love or relationships.

As in other countries, Arab pop stars also have been engaged in social issues, for example during the COVID-19 pandemic, or more recently in regards to issues relating to women's rights, domestic violence and mental health, with artists such as Elissa.

=== Empowerment through artistic expression ===
The majority of the new wave of more influential Arabic pop are largely Lebanese like Nancy Ajram, Elissa, Nawal Al Zoghbi, and Haifa Wehbe. The rise of these artists is partly attributed to their push of breaking traditional gender norms through lyrics, music videos, and that Lebanon is seen as more culturally liberal than other Arab countries. Beauty norms have also changed since the rise of Arab pop music videos. While there are artists like Maysham Nahas who have opted to fit a more Western European look, there has been a shift towards a more "Arab" look among female pop stars. For example, Nancy Ajram dyed her hair darker from her natural dark blonde hair and many others like Haifa, Ruby, Elissa, etc. maintain their dark long hair and use "culturally-specific make-up" to enhance their femininity.

In this way, performers are part of the discourse on negotiating and reproducing identity and what is considered part of the social culture of various Arab states due to the large amounts of controversies these popstars receive (positive and negative). Without disturbing audiences (for better or worse) through their music and visuals, Arab pop would not have as much success in influencing a new shift for Arabic pop post-1990s. Mass broadcast channels and streaming services have cultivated a pan-Arab identity among audiences. Music is continuously reproduced and disseminated by circulating cultural structures and symbols that begin to be understood as universal by communities. Thus, Arab pop is seen as an encourager of a larger, transnational, Arab identity.

== Audiences of Arabic pop ==
The main audience for Arabic pop are younger generations whose main hobby is music along with gaming and television. Though particularly popular among the youth and young adult Arab population, Arabic pop has found an audience with older fans as well. Most fans of Arabic pop live in the Arab World, but Arabic pop has also continually charted in Europe since the 1990s, especially in the French Top 20. Arabic pop has fans in communities of immigrants from Arabic speaking countries, particularly in France, the United Kingdom, Australia, Ukraine, Canada, and the United States. Further fan bases come from DJs playing Arabic pop in dance venues or from Western belly dance fans.

In Australia, SBS Radio plays Arab pop at 6:00 PM-6:00 AM on a radio format called SBS Arabic. Many artists speak several languages and have songs in various languages, especially French and Spanish.

== History of Arabic pop ==
=== Early days: 19th-early 20th century ===
The early days of Arabic pop featured a more traditional style of music. Artists such as Umm Kulthum, who is now considered an Arabic music legend, made it acceptable for female singers to perform in public.

In some cases, the performers wrote their own lyrics, but the music was written by others. Both lyrics and music were in characteristic Arabic styles, and songs tended to last well over 10–30 minutes. Several of Umm Kulthum's songs were measured in hours. Performances were broadcast over the radio, and live tours were organized. The songs could have been compared to Western Jazz for their improvisation and to Opera for their traditional elements and length.

=== Modernization: 1950s–1970s ===
During this period, Arabic pop began to emerge, although the older style of the early days was still extremely popular. Songs began to become more westernized in sound and length (now around 5–20 minutes). Artists such as Abdel Halim Hafez or the Lebanese superstar Fairuz rose to fame during this period.

=== 1970s–1980s ===
In the 1970s with the rise of Western artists such as ABBA and the death of the early artists such as Umm Kulthum, Arabic pop began to take shape. By the early 1980s artists such as the arabic icon Aziza Jalal, Mohamed Mounir, Majida El Roumi, Samira Said and Laila Ghofran rose to fame with their Western sounding Arabic pop.

=== 1990s–present ===
By the mid to late 1990s, a new style of Arabic pop stars became popular, defining the genre as it is known today. Artists such as Amr Diab, Mohamed Fouad, Angham, Elissa, Sherine, Nawal Al Zoghbi, Wael Kfoury, Assi El Hallani, Diana Haddad, Kadim Al Sahir, Nancy Ajram and Haifa Wehbe rose to fame, using modern marketing, both Arabic and Western electronic instruments, as well as catchy melodies. Arab pop's hybridity of traditional Arab folk and Western music marks a shift towards a musical global citizenship which highlights the tension between preserving tradition and adapting with Western influence.

The growing internationalization of Arabic music led to a new style of Arab pop, usually called "A-pop" or "Arabizi", to develop among younger generations of diaspora Arabs by the 2020s, fostered by social media. The subgenre blends Western influences (such as the usage of English and other languages) and traditional Arab elements (such as the instrumentation), and is characterized by a sense of nostalgia for one's roots. Prominent artists of Arabizi include Saint Levant, DYSTINCT, Elyanna, Zeyne, Dana Salah, MC Abdul, Issam Alnajjar, Belly, Omar Offendum, Narcy, Nooriyah, Bayou and DJamil.

== See also ==
- List of Arabic pop musicians
- Arabesque music
- Raï
- Arabic music
- Al Jeel
- Chalga
- Islamic music
- Turbo-folk
- Folk-pop
- Mizrahi music
- Nasheed
- Laïko
- Coma Dance Festival

== Literature ==
- Andrew Hammond. Pop Culture Arab World!: Media, Arts, and Lifestyle. — ABC-CLIO, 2005. — 393 p. — ISBN 9781851094493.
- Robert A. Stebbins. Work and Leisure in the Middle East: The Common Ground of Two Separate Worlds. — Routledge, 2017. — 227 p. — ISBN 9781351471060.
