= List of churches in Aleppo =

List of active churches and cathedrals in the Syrian city of Aleppo. Note that around 20 churches received varying damage during the Battle of Aleppo, which ended in December 2016.

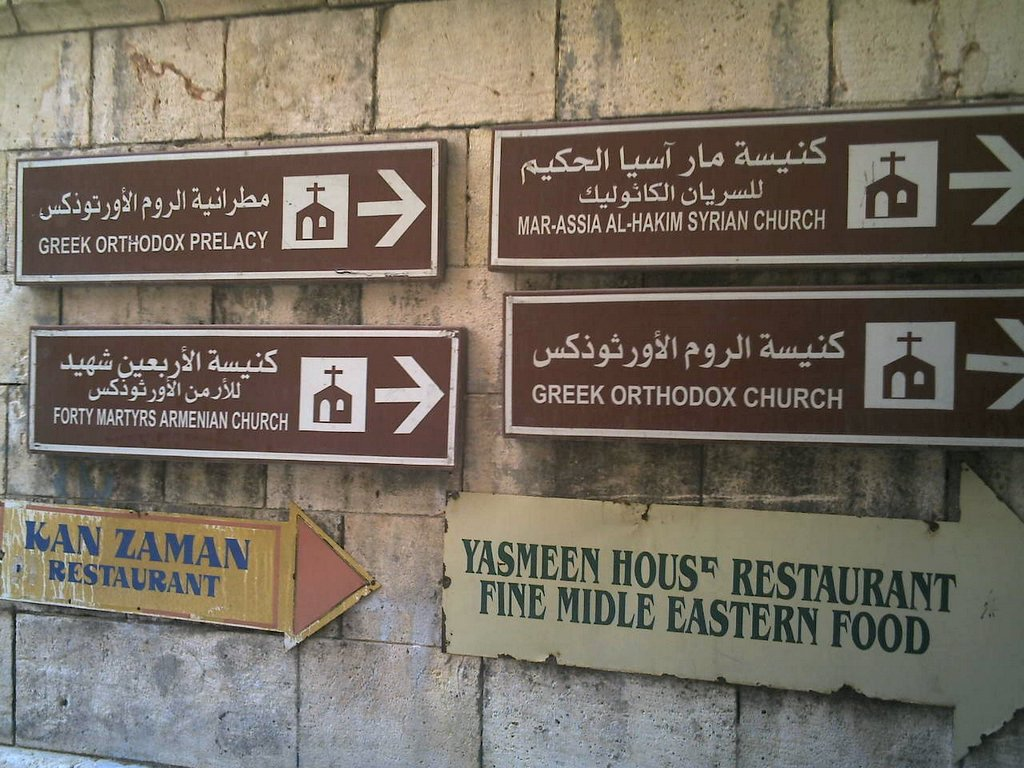
Bilingual street signs referring to church locations in the historic al-Jdayde district of Aleppo

== Armenian churches ==
- Armenian Apostolic Church, Armenian Diocese of Beroea

Name	Consecration year	Notes
Forty Martyrs Cathedral	1491	Located in the Jdayde quarter of Aleppo, it is the seat of the Armenian diocese, as well as one of the oldest operating churches in the city. Damaged by the rebels through an underground explosion on April 28, 2015.
Surp Krikor Lusavorich Church (Saint Gregory the Illuminator's Church)	1933	Built in the Midan district between 1930 and 1933 by Armenian refugees from Cilicia who survived the Armenian genocide. It was consecrated on November 26, 1933.
Surp Hagop Church (Saint Jacob of Nisibis Church)	1943	Built in the Old Syriac (Assyrian) Quarter by Armenian refugees from Urfa who survived the Armenian genocide. It was consecrated on June 3, 1943.
Surp Kevork Church (Saint George's Church)	1965	Originally consecrated in 1923 as a small wooden church by Armenian refugees from Marash who survived the Armenian Genocide. The current building was consecrated on September 26, 1965, after a long construction process launched in 1937. However, the interior of the church was burnt by the rebels on October 29, 2012.
Church of the Holy Mother of God	1983	Built in the Suleimaniyeh-Villat quarter by the descendants of Armenian Genocide survivors from Ayntab, and consecrated on May 1, 1983.

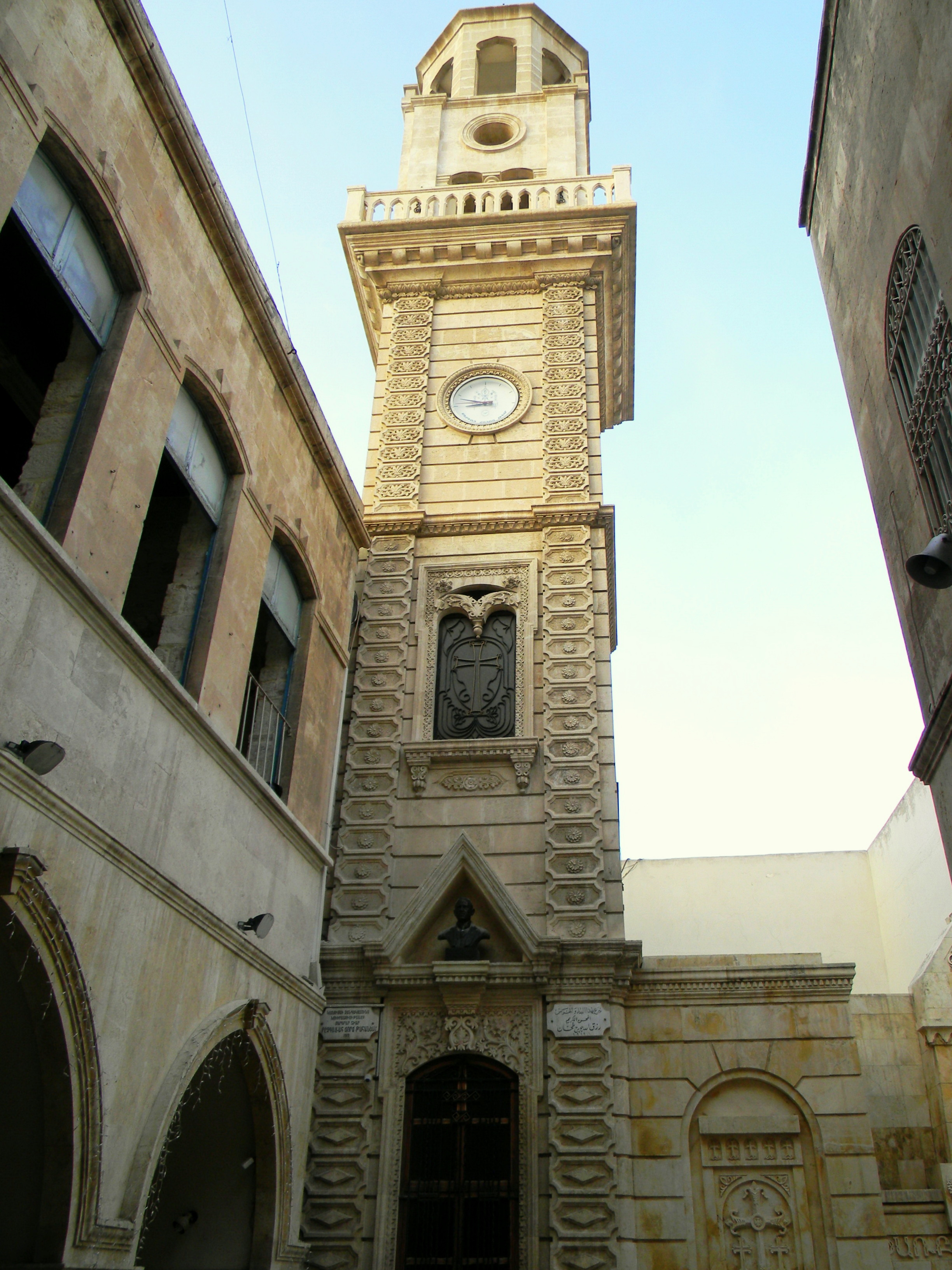
Forty Martyrs Cathedral

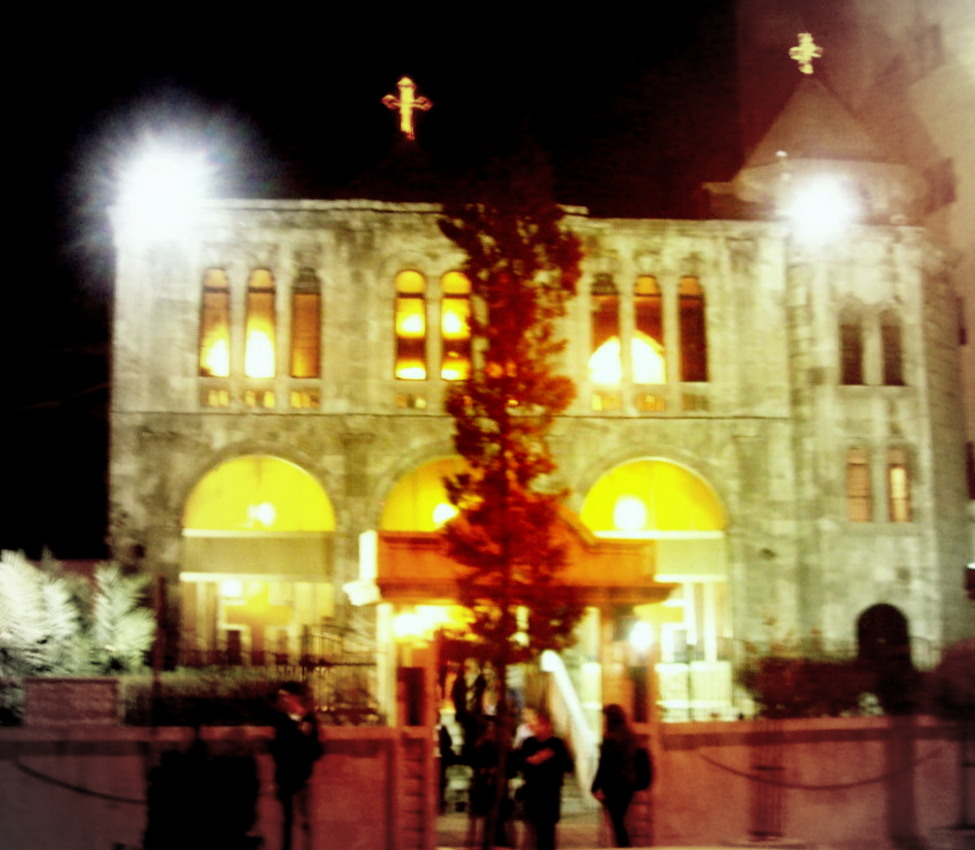
Surp Krikor Lusavorich Church

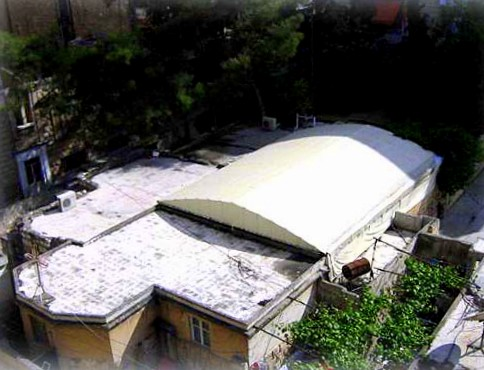
Surp Hagop Church

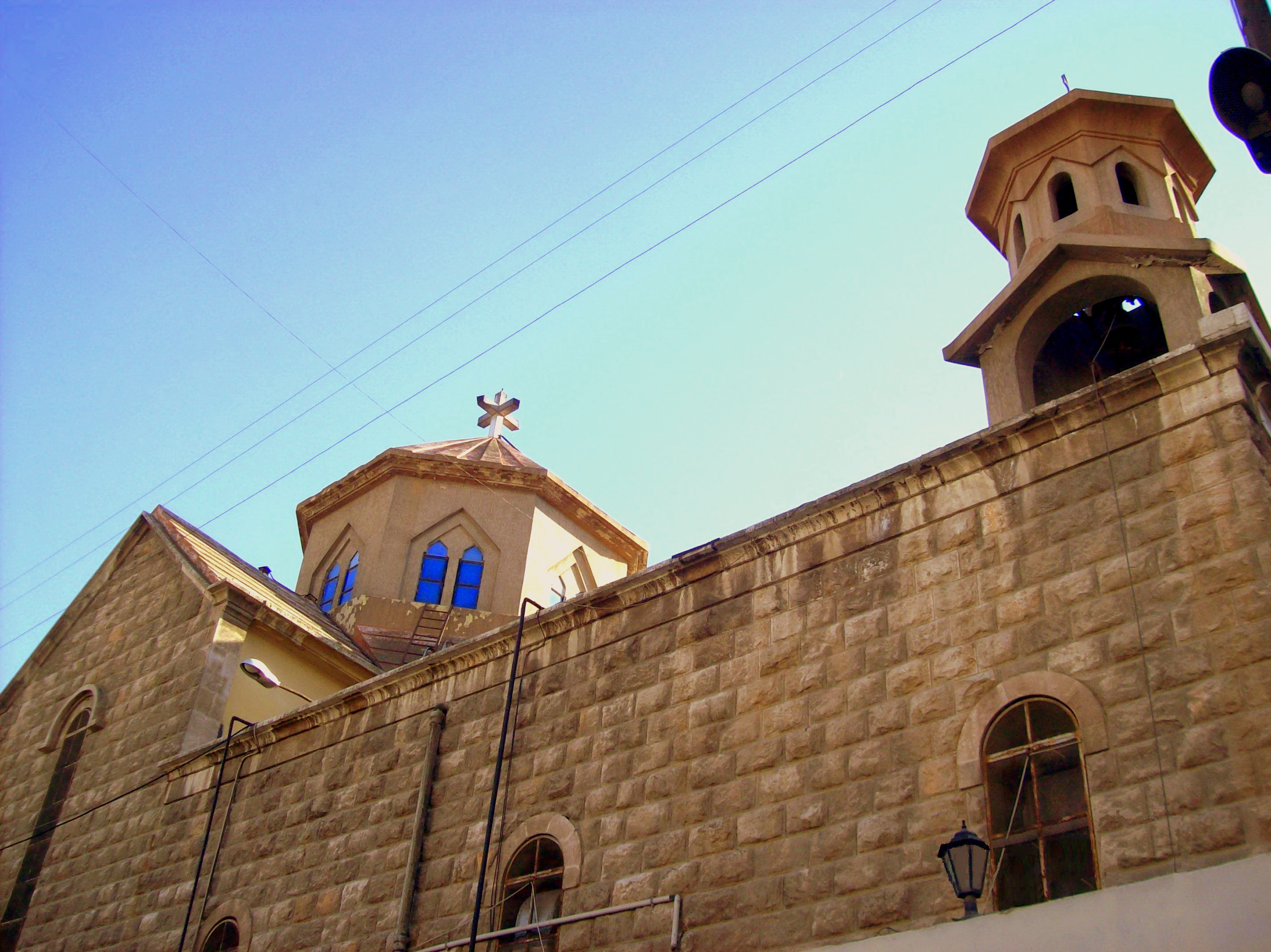
Surp Kevork Church

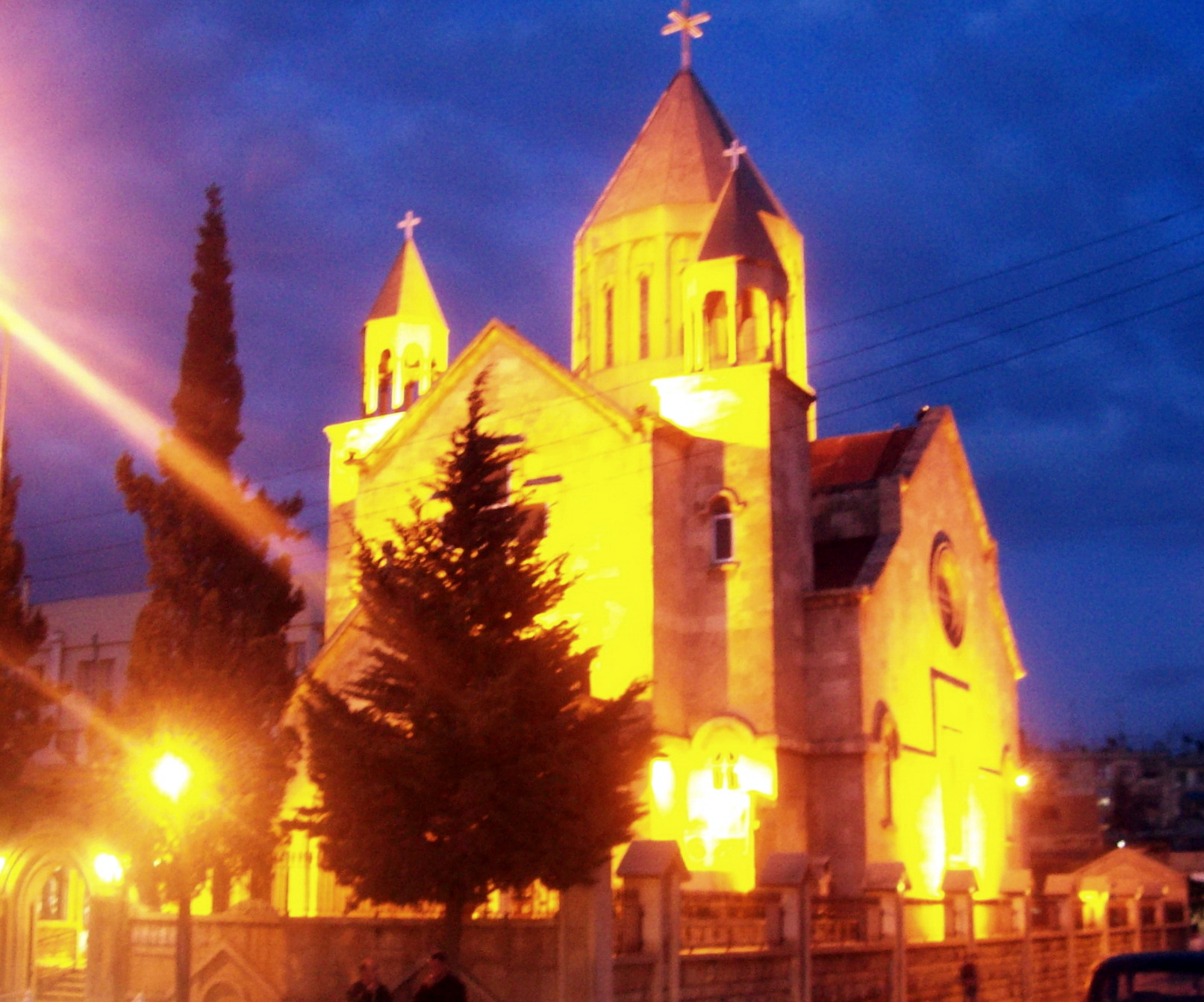
Church of the Holy Mother of God
- Armenian Catholic Church, Armenian Catholic Archeparchy of Aleppo

Name	Consecration year	Notes
Cathedral of Our Mother of Reliefs	1840	Located at Tilel Street near the Jdayde quarter, the church is serving as the seat of the diocese since its consecration in 1840. It was damaged after being shelled by the rebels on January 9, 2015.
Church of the Holy Saviour - Saint Barbara	1937	Originally opened as a small prayer house by the Jesuit fathers. The current building was opened in 1937 on the same location, in the Suleimaniyeh district.
Church of Our Lady of Annunciation	1942	Located in the Sheikh Maqsood district, the church was originally opened in 1942. It was entirely rebuilt in 2000. However, it was heavily damaged after being shelled by the rebels on December 3, 2015.
Holy Trinity Church	1965	Locate in the Midan district, it is also known as Zvartnots Church, consecrated on June 13, 1965, on the 50th anniversary of the Armenian Genocide.
Church of the Holy Cross	1993	The church was consecrated on April 24, 1993, in the Aziziyeh district.

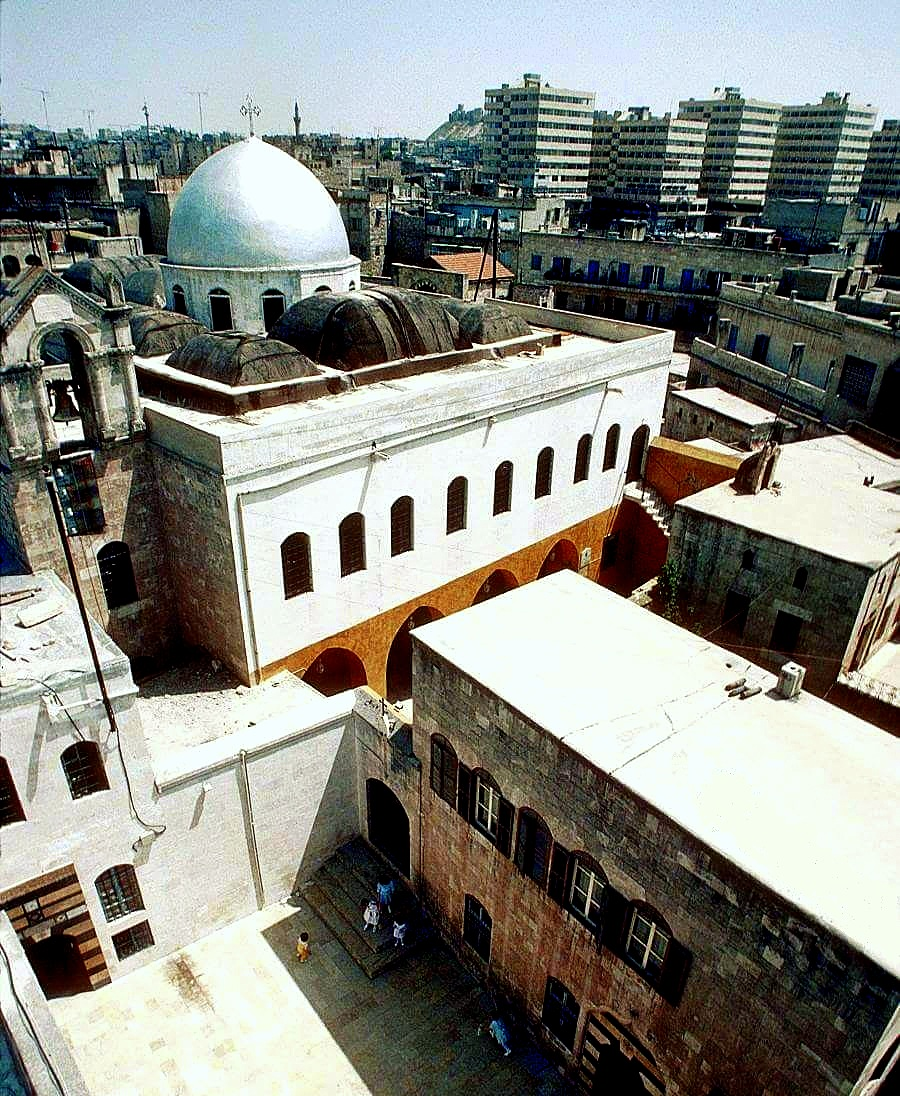
Cathedral of Our Mother of Reliefs

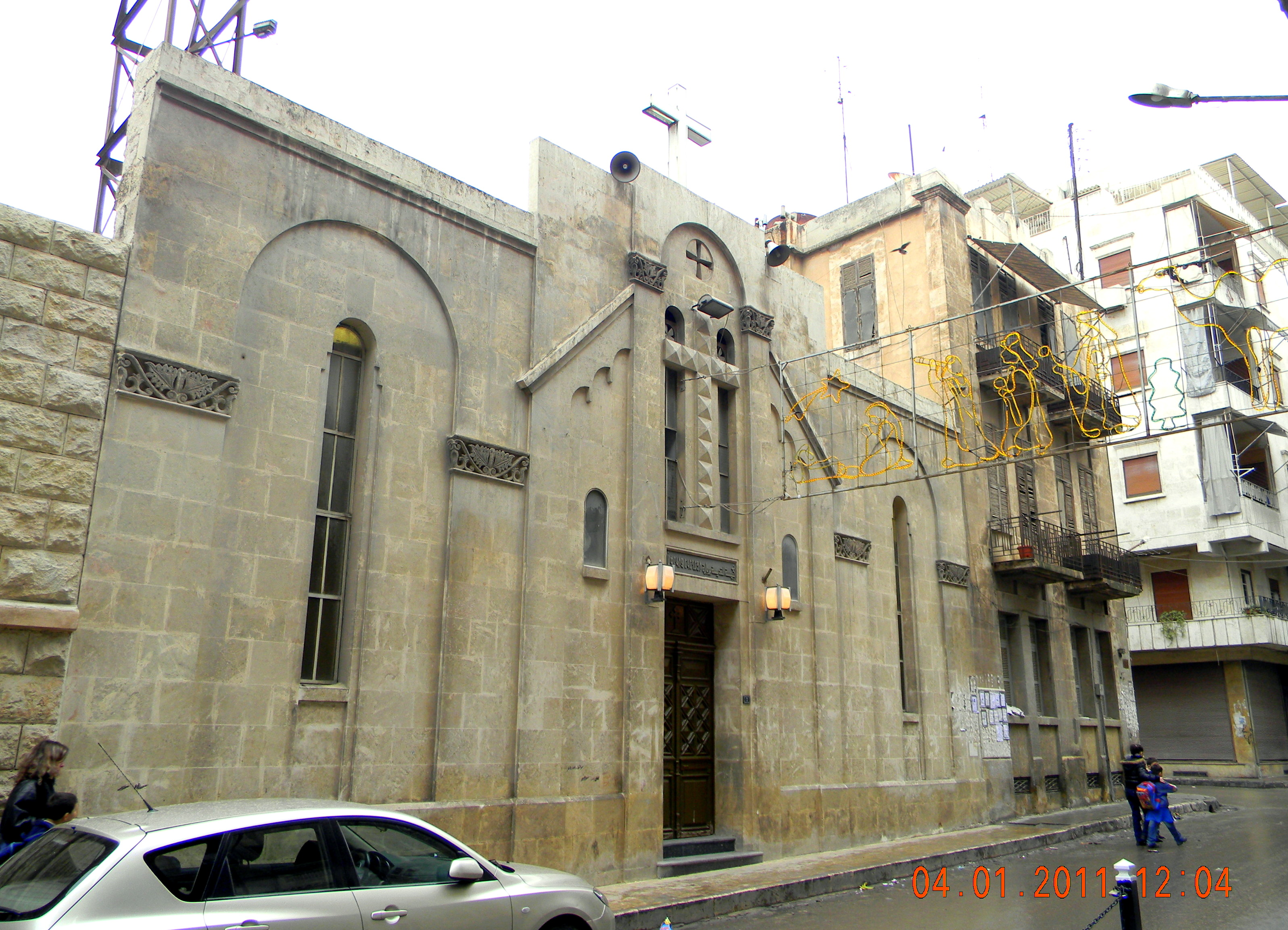
Church of the Holy Saviour - Saint Barbara

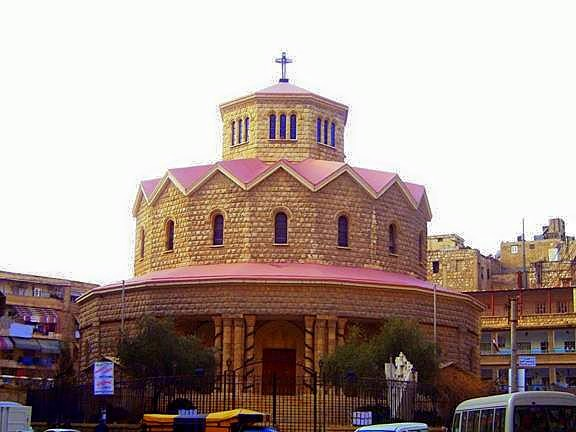
Holy Trinity Church

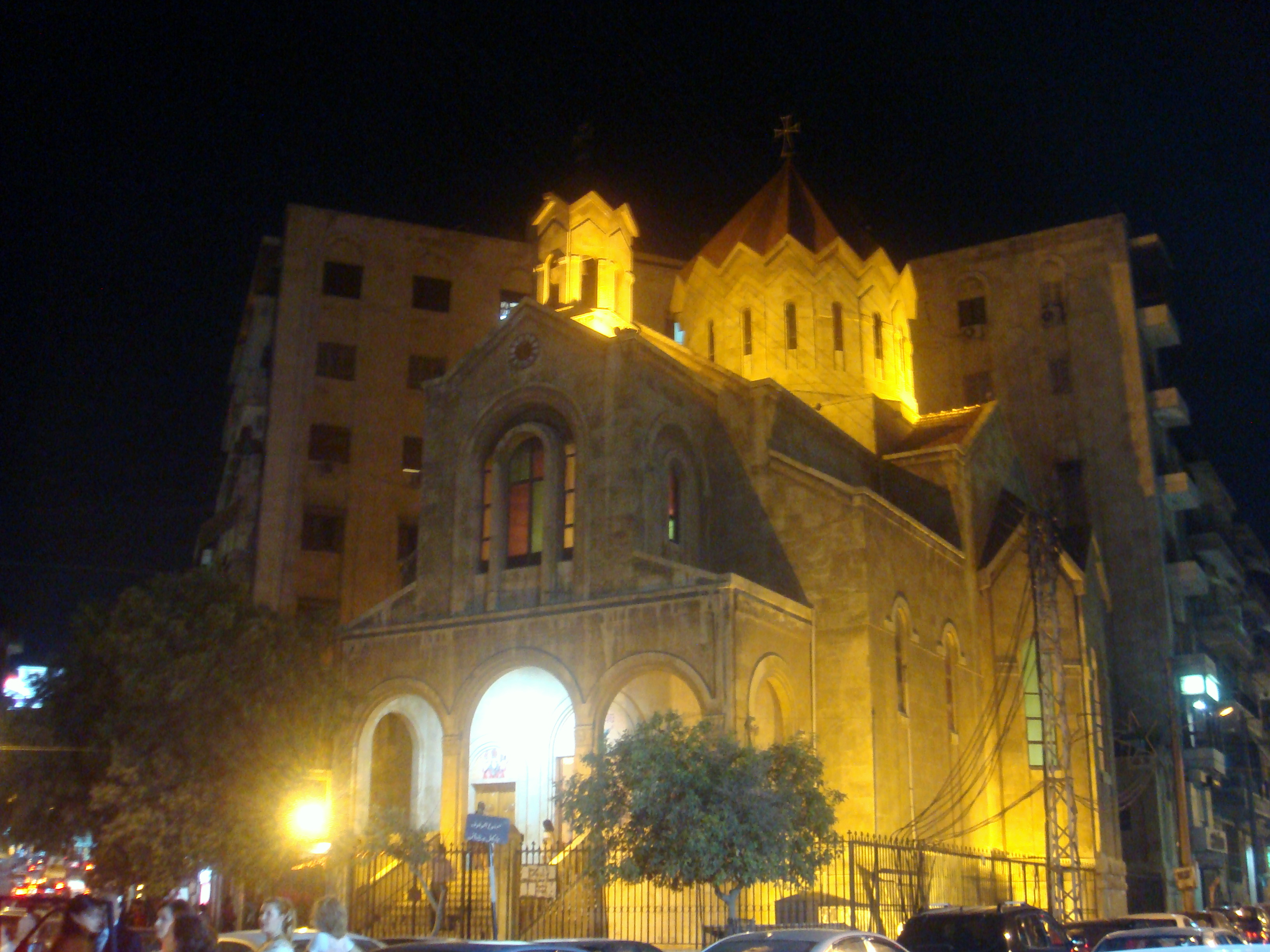
Holy Cross Church
- Armenian Evangelical Church, Union of the Armenian Evangelical Churches in the Near East

Name	Consecration year	Notes
Emmanuel Church	1923	Serves as the seat of the congregation since its consecration in 1923, in the Azizyeh district. The roof of the church was heavily damaged after being shelled by rebels on January 17, 2016. The church is currently being renovated.
Bethel Church	1937	Built between 1934 and 1937 in the Jabriyeh district, by Armenian refugees from Marash who survived the Armenian genocide.
Martyrs' Church	1965	Located in the Suleimaniyeh district, the church was consecrated on May 14, 1965. Suffered minor damages after being frequently shelled by the rebels during 2013.

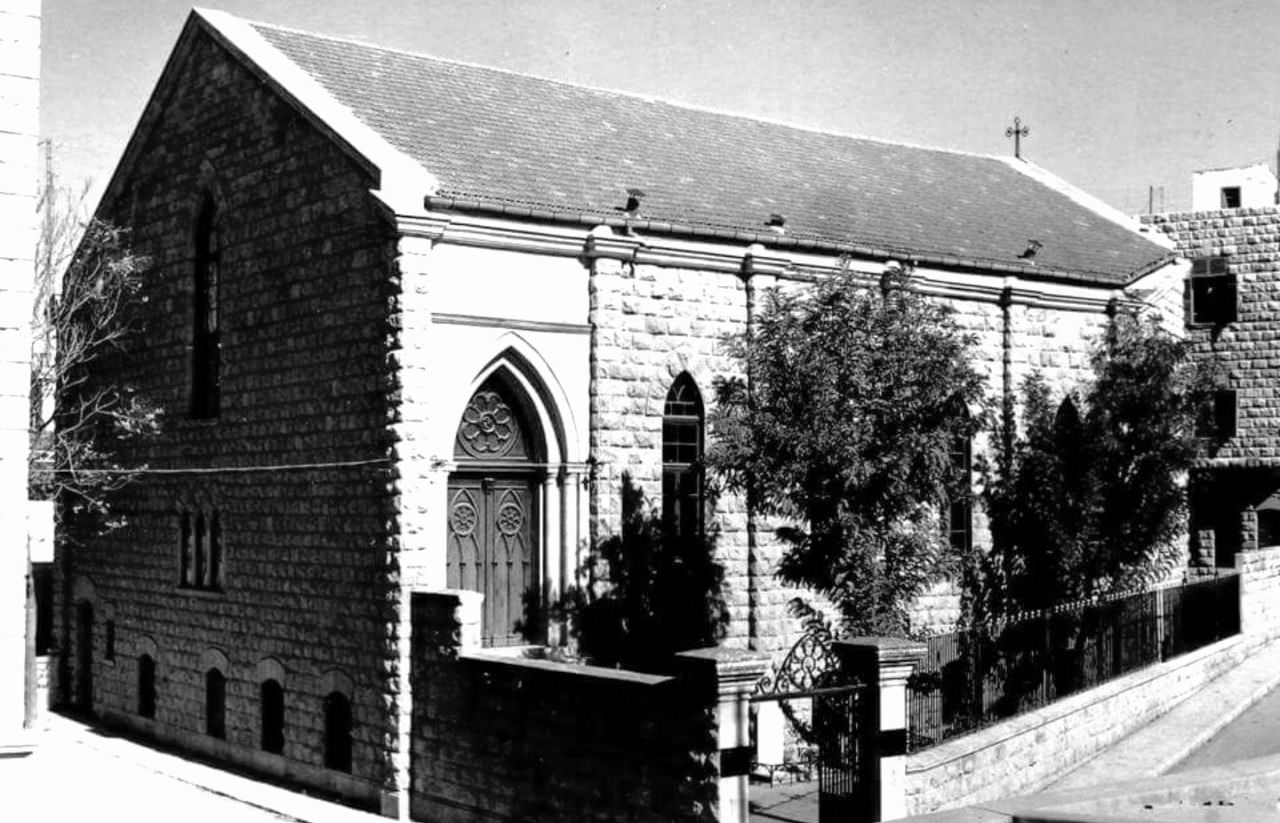
Emmanuel Cathedral

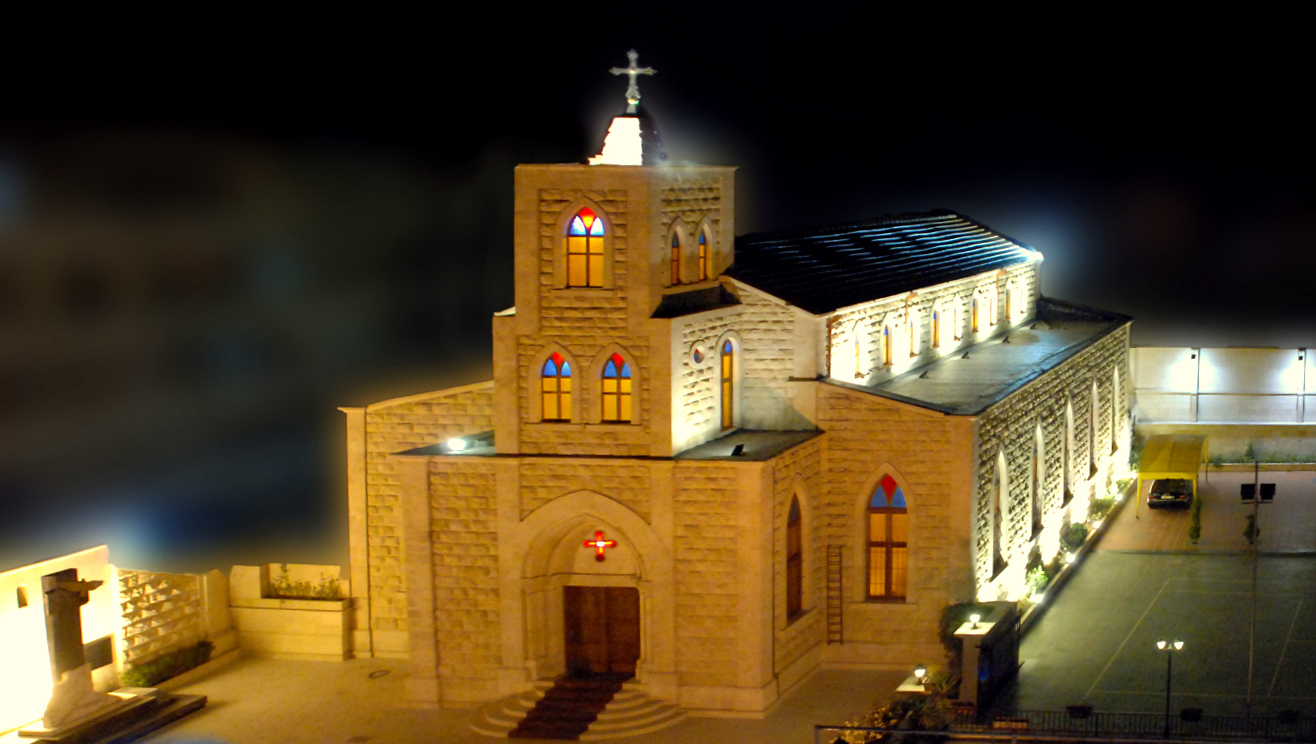
Bethel Church

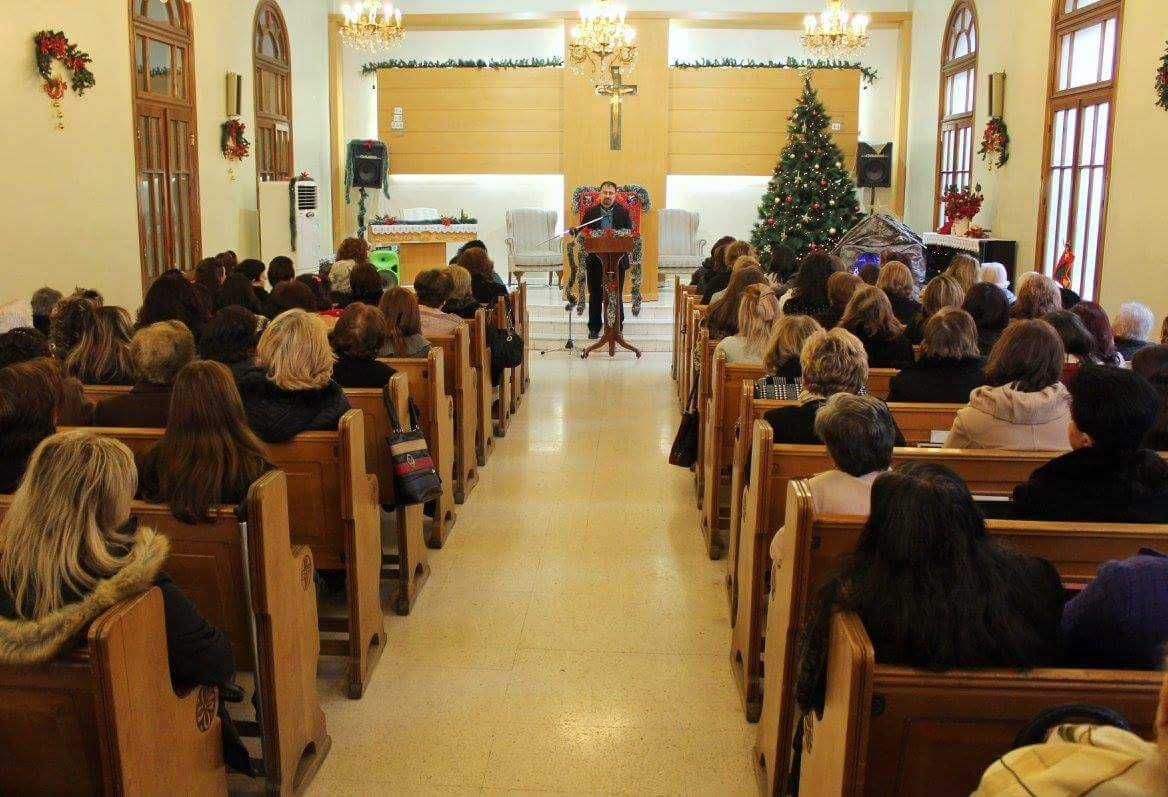
Martyrs' Church

== Syriac churches ==
- Syriac Orthodox Church, Syriac Orthodox Archdiocese of Aleppo

Name	Consecration year	Notes
Cathedral of Saint Ephrem the Syrian	1926	Serving as the seat of the diocese since its consecration on January 17, 1926. It was named after Saint Ephrem the Syrian.
Saint George the Martyr's Church	1935	Built in the Old Syriac Quarter of Aleppo by Syriac refugees from Urfa, between 1932 and 1935. It was consecrated on December 22, 1935.
Church of Our Lady of Syrians	1994	Occupying the ground floor of an apartment building, the church was consecrated on October 15, 1994, in the New Syriac quarter of Aleppo.
Church of the Holy Mandylion	2003	Built in 2002-03 in the Old Syriac Quarter of Aleppo, near the Saint George the Martyr's Church. It was consecrated in 2003 in the memory of an old Syrian church of the same name in Urha.

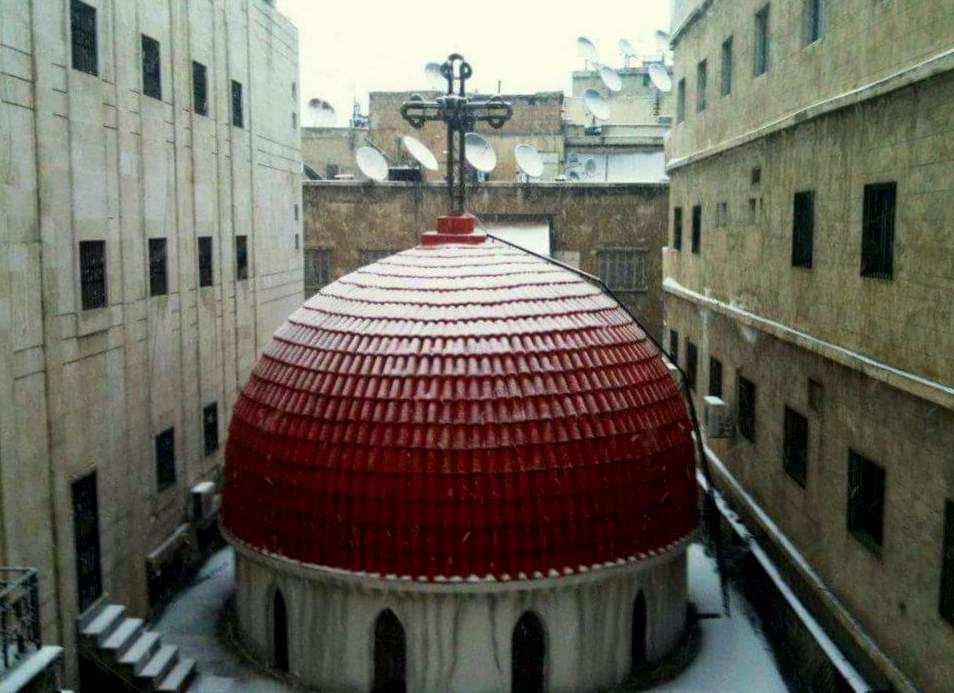
Cathedral of Saint Ephrem the Syrian

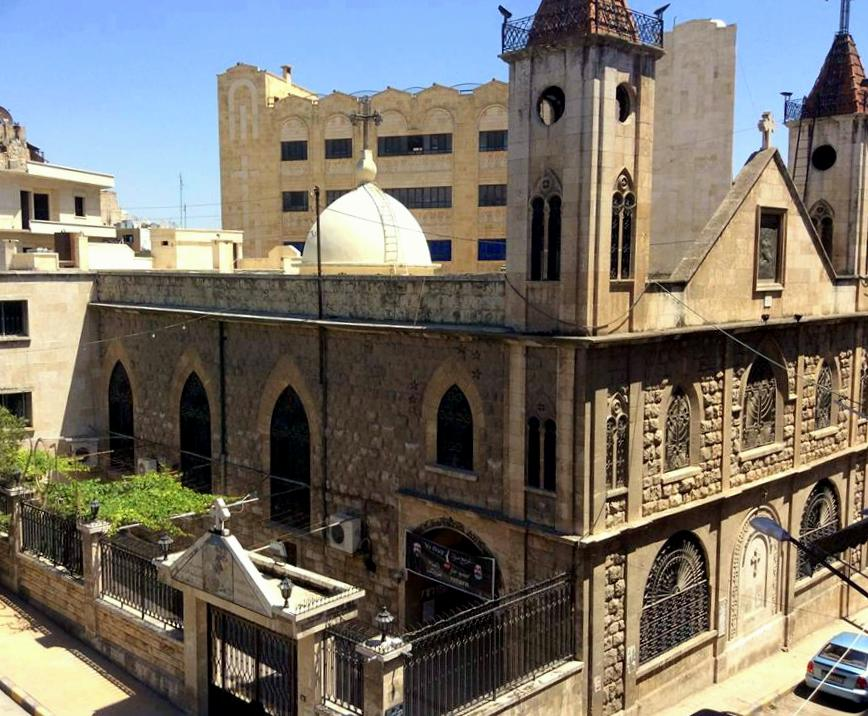
Saint George the Martyr's Church

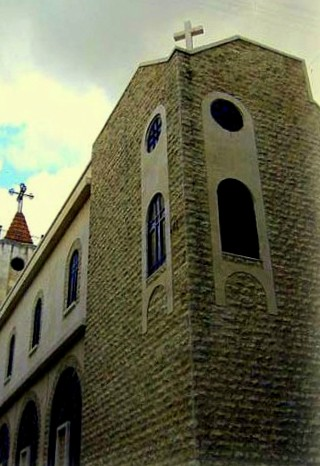
Church of the Holy Mandylion
- Syriac Catholic Church, Syriac Catholic Archeparchy of Aleppo

Name	Consecration year	Notes
Mar Assia al-Hakim Church	c. 1500	One of the historic churches of Ancient Aleppo, served as the seat of the diocese until 1970. The belfry was destroyed after being shelled by rebels on September 16, 2012, while the church was severely damaged by the rebels through an underground explosion on April 28, 2015.
Saint Ephrem the Syrian's Church	1960	Built between 1958 and 1960 by Syriac refugees from Urha. It was consecrated on June 18, 1960, to commemorate the death of Saint Ephrem the Syrian.
Cathedral of Our Lady of Assumption	1970	Became the new seat of the diocese upon its consecration on March 22, 1970.

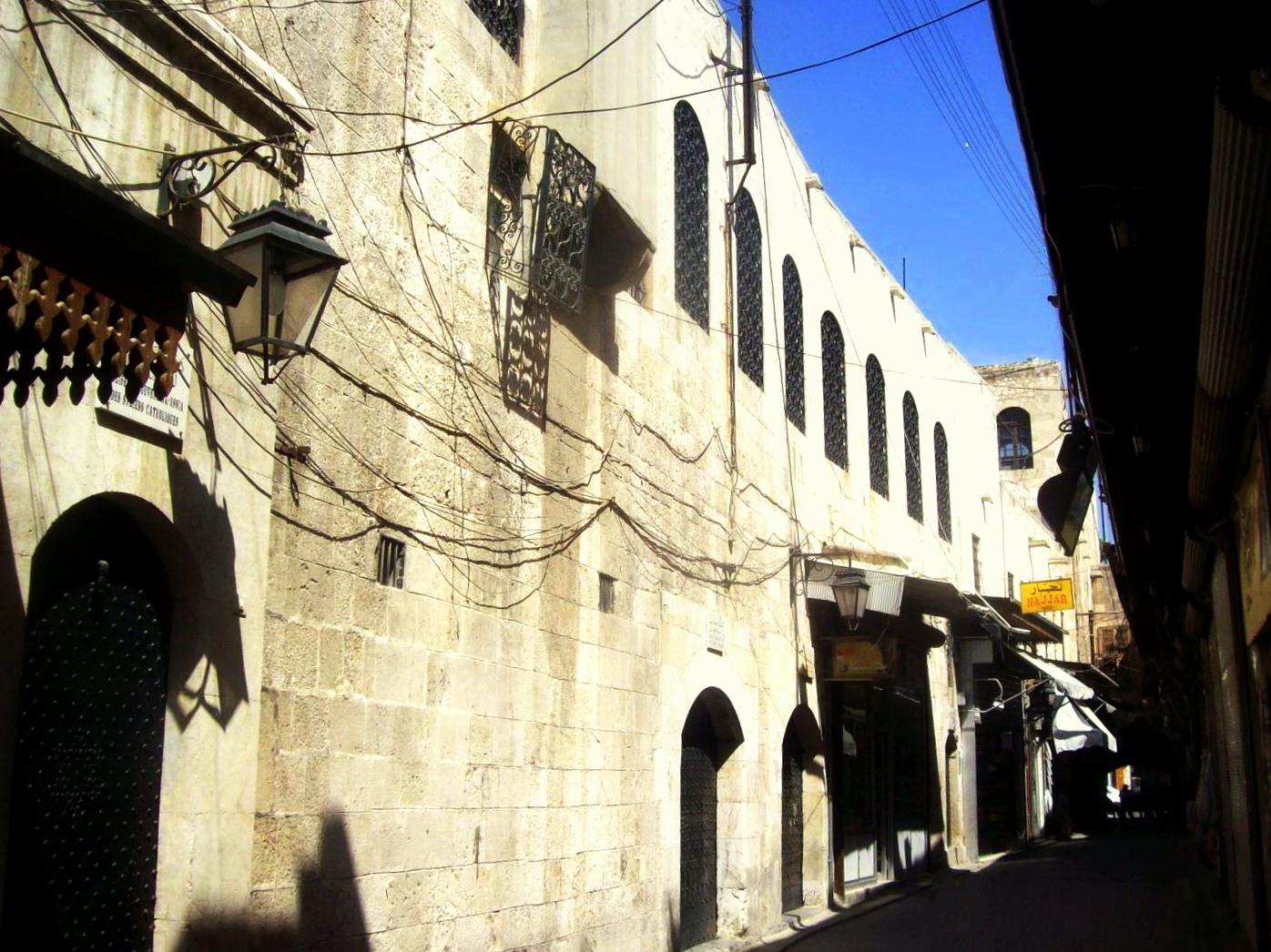
Mar Assia al-Hakim Church

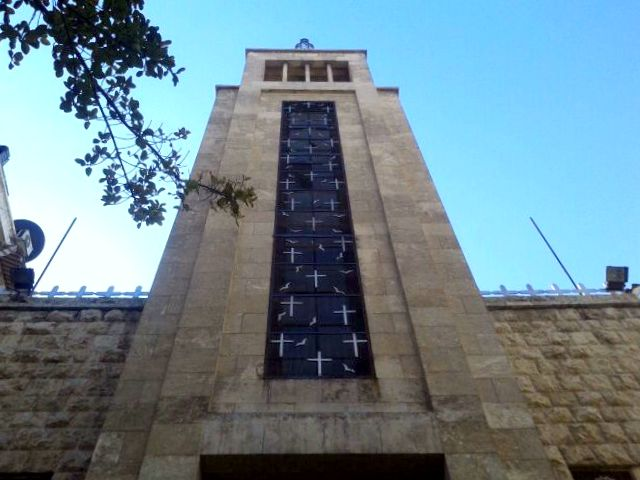
Saint Ephrem the Syrian's Church

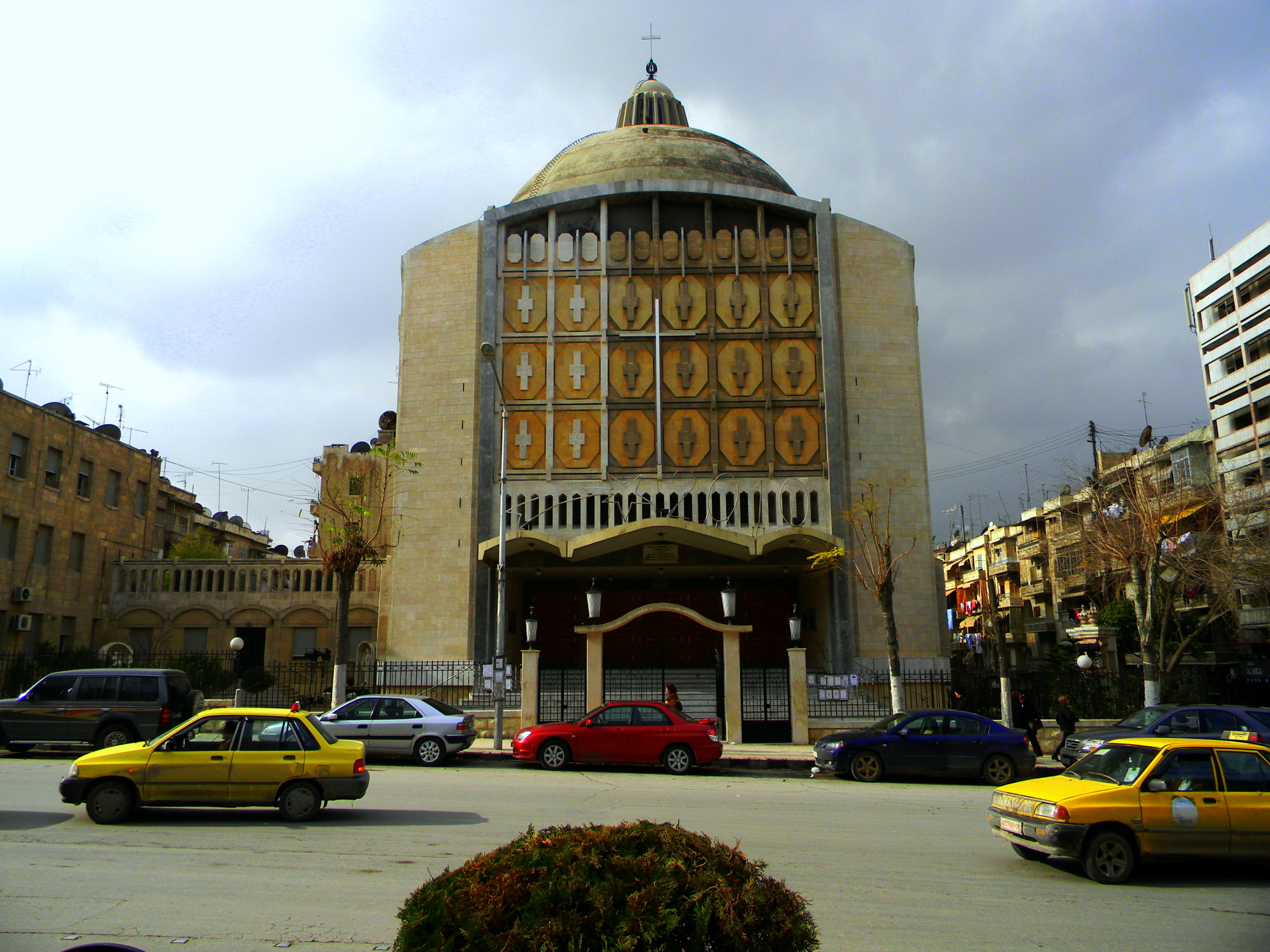
Cathedral of Our Lady of Assumption
- Chaldean Catholic Church, Chaldean Catholic Eparchy of Aleppo

Name	Consecration year	Notes
Saint Joseph's Cathedral	1972	Seat of the diocese.

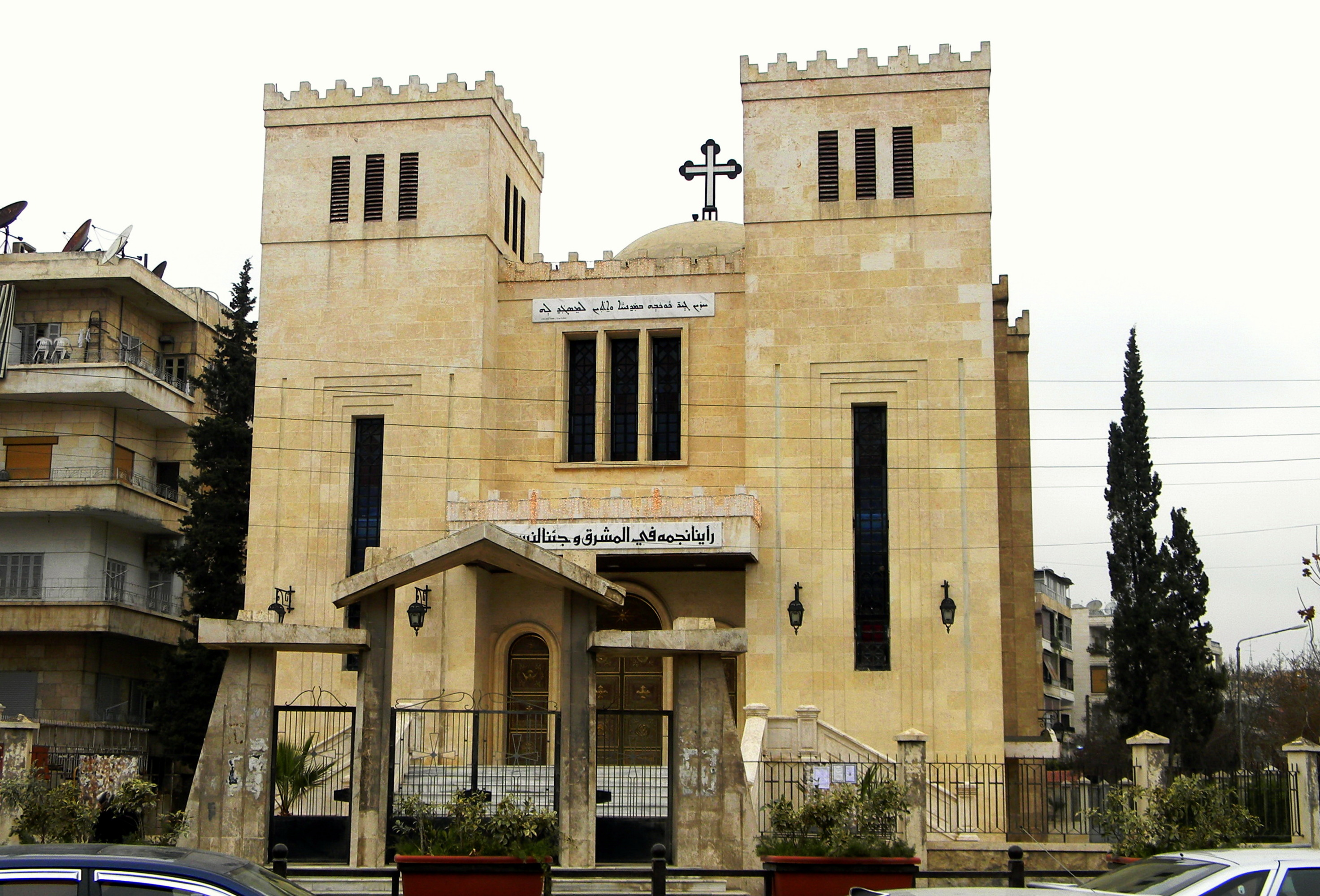
Saint Joseph's Cathedral
- Syriac Maronite Church, Maronite Catholic Archeparchy of Aleppo

Name	Consecration year	Notes
Saint Elijah Cathedral	1873	Seat of the diocese. Frequently targeted by the rebels in 2012-15, severely damaged after a major rebel attack in May 2015.
Church of Our Lady of Montligeon	1909	Severely damaged after being frequently shelled by the rebels in 2012-15.
Church of the Sacred Heart of Jesus	2018	Occupying the ground floor of an apartment building, the church was consecrated on October 7, 2018, after 3 months of preparation works, in the Suleymaniyeh-Villat quarter of Aleppo.

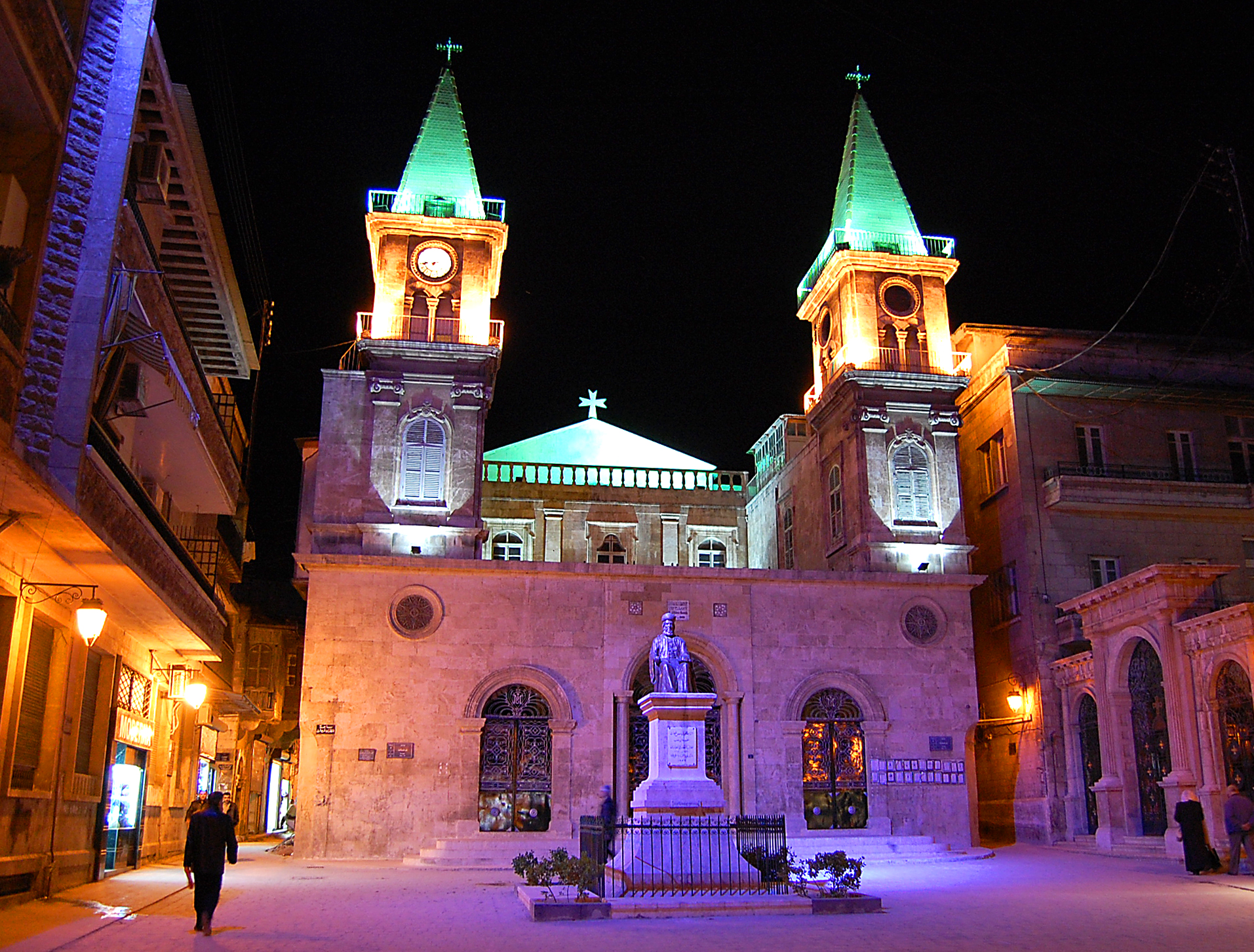
Saint Elijah Cathedral

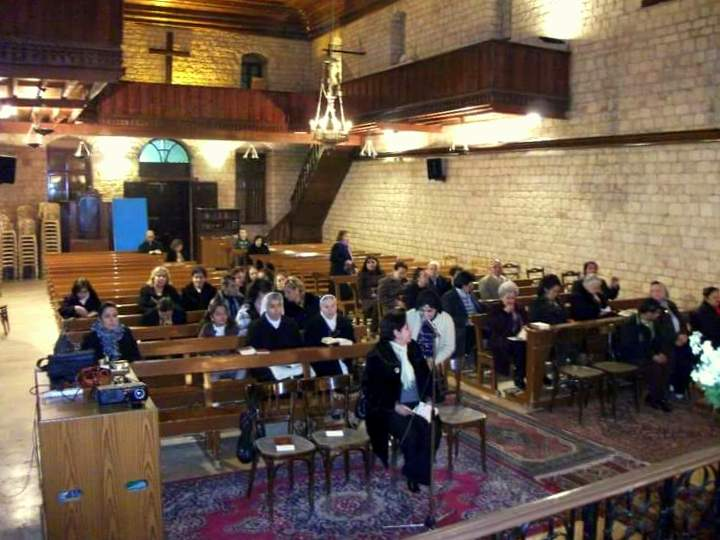
Church of Our Lady of Montligeon
- Syrian Evangelical Church

Name	Consecration year	Notes
Syrian Evangelical Church of Aleppo		

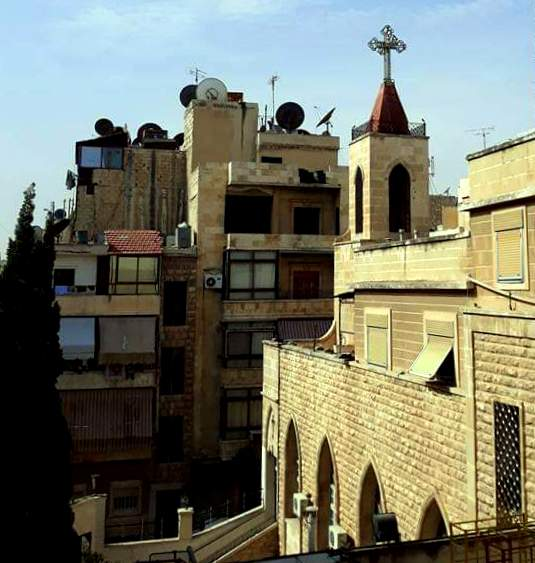
Syrian Evangelical Church

== Greek rite churches ==
- Greek Orthodox Church of Antioch, Greek Orthodox Archdiocese of Beroea and Alexandretta

Name	Consecration year	Notes
Church of the Dormition of Our Lady	c. 1500	One of the historic churches of Ancient Aleppo, served as the seat of the diocese until 2000. Damaged by the rebels through an underground explosion on April 28, 2015.
Saint George's Church		
Church of Saints Peter and Paul		
Saint Elijah the Prophet's Cathedral	2000	The church became the seat of the diocese upon its consecration on December 17, 2000. The church was entirely built through donations of the Greek community members in Aleppo.
Saint Joseph's Church	2002	Consecrated on March 17, 2012 by the Greek Orthodox Archdiocese of Beroea and Alexandretta. The church is co-administered by the Melkite Greek Catholic Archeparchy of Aleppo.

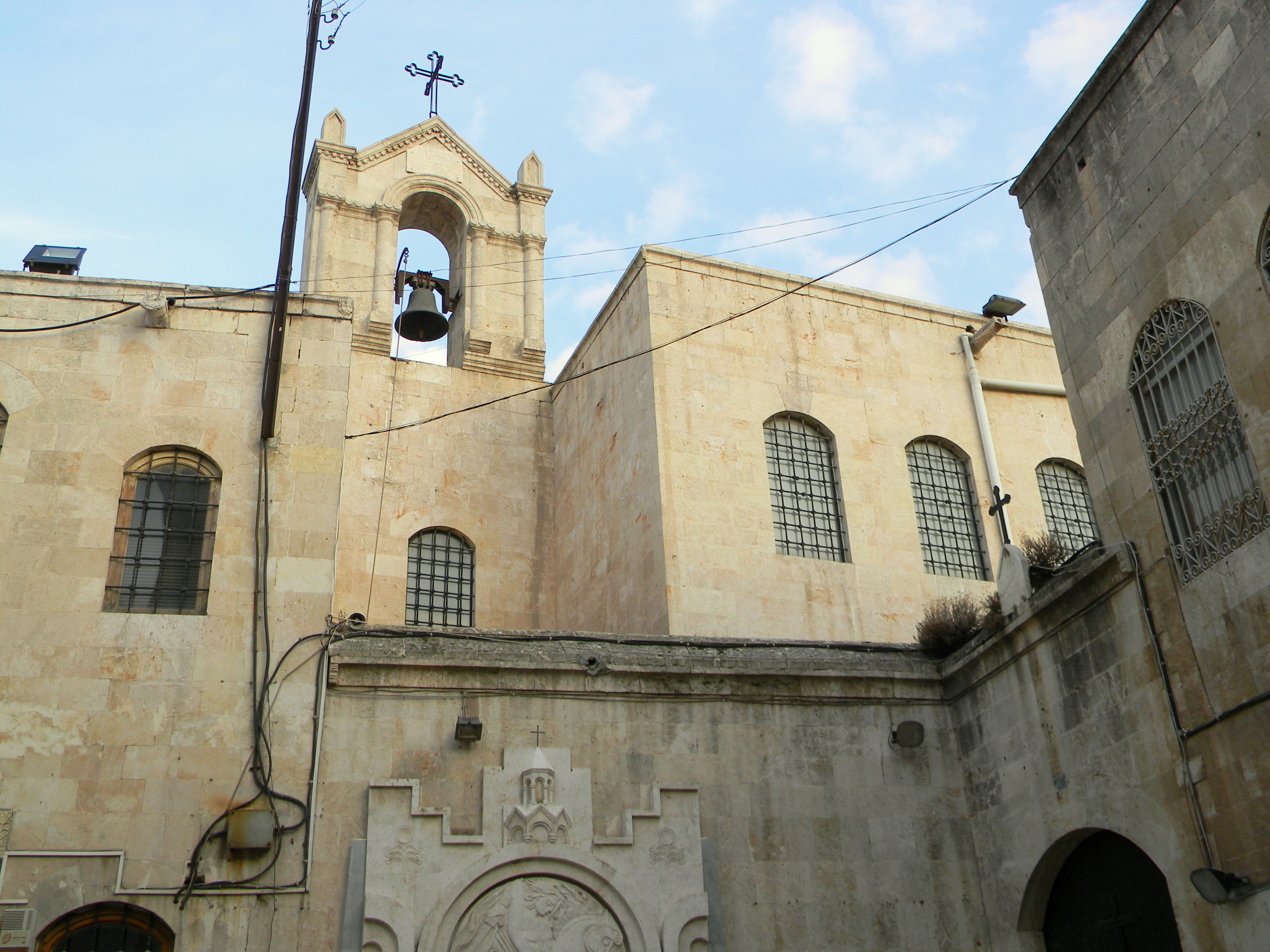
Church of the Dormition of Our Lady

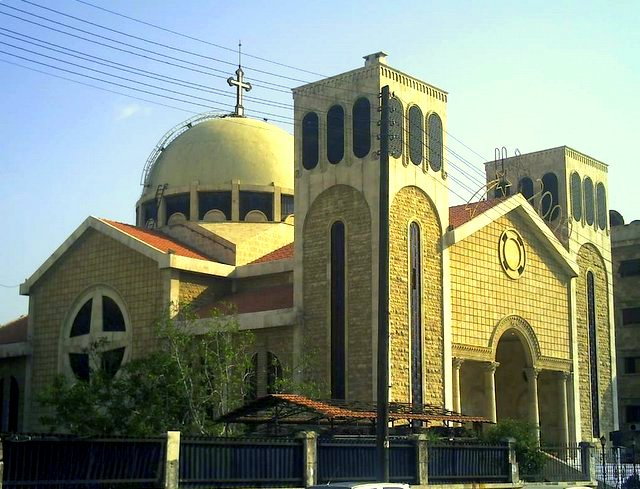
Saint Elijah the Prophet's Cathedral

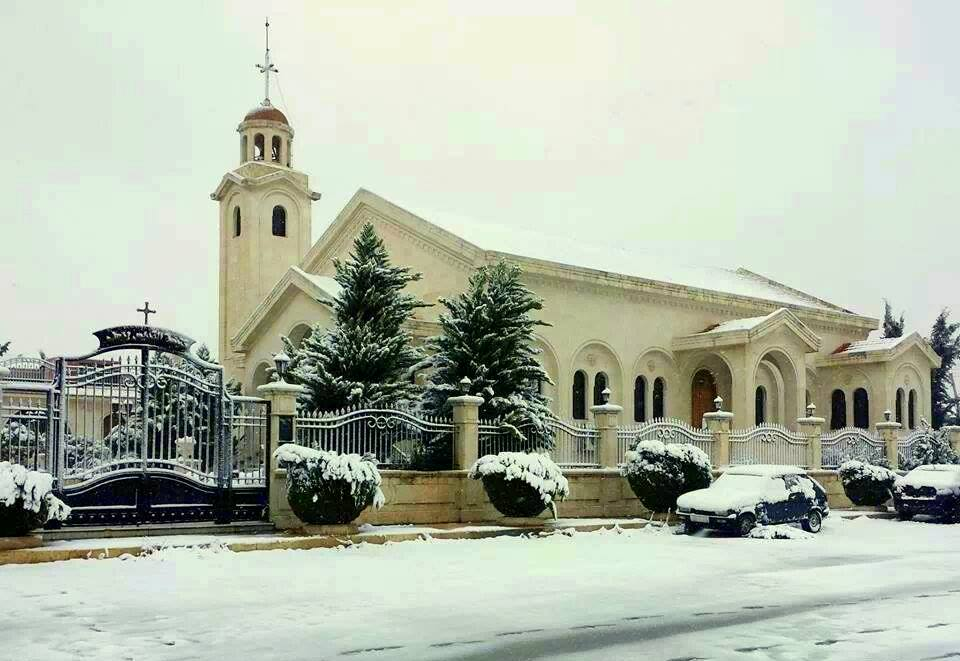
Saint Joseph's Church
- Melkite Greek Catholic Church, Melkite Greek Catholic Archeparchy of Aleppo

Name	Consecration year	Notes
Cathedral of Virgin Mary	1843	Seat of the diocese. Frequently targeted by the rebels in 2012-15, severely damaged after a major rebel attack in May 2015.
Saint Demetrius Church	1933	Named after Saint Demetrius of Thessaloniki.
Saint Michael the Archangel Church	1935	
Saint Matilda Church	1964	
Saint George's Church	1969	Named after Saint George, one of the largest places of worship in Aleppo.
Saint Theresa Church	1995	
Church of Our Lady of Joy	2009-12	Located in the Sheikh Maqsood district, the church was damaged after being shelled by the rebels on April 17, 2016.
Church of Our Lady of Annunciation at the Monastery of John Chrysostom	2015	The church was not consecrated due to the break-out of the battles in Aleppo. It was partly damaged after rebel attack in October–November 2016.

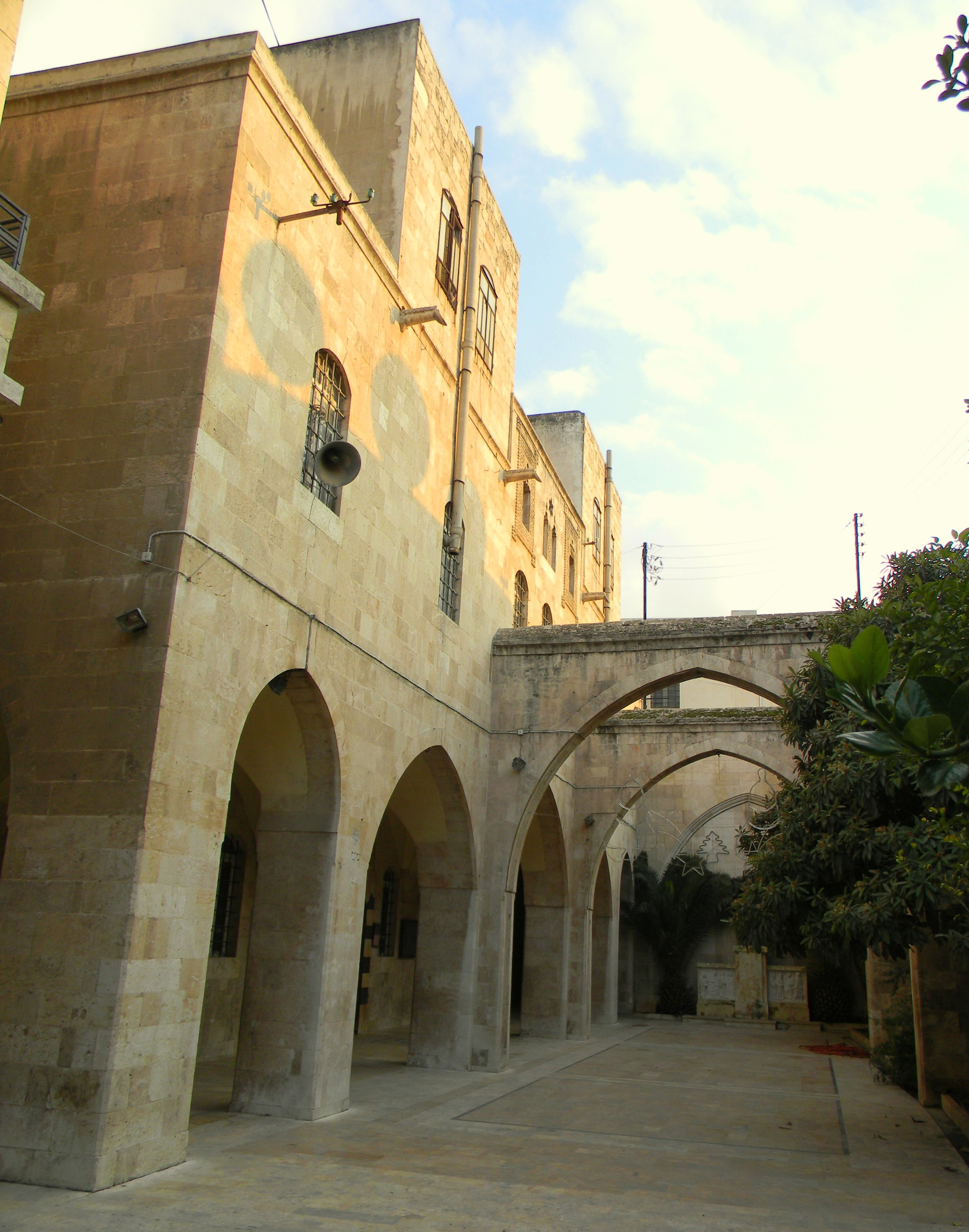
Cathedral of Virgin Mary

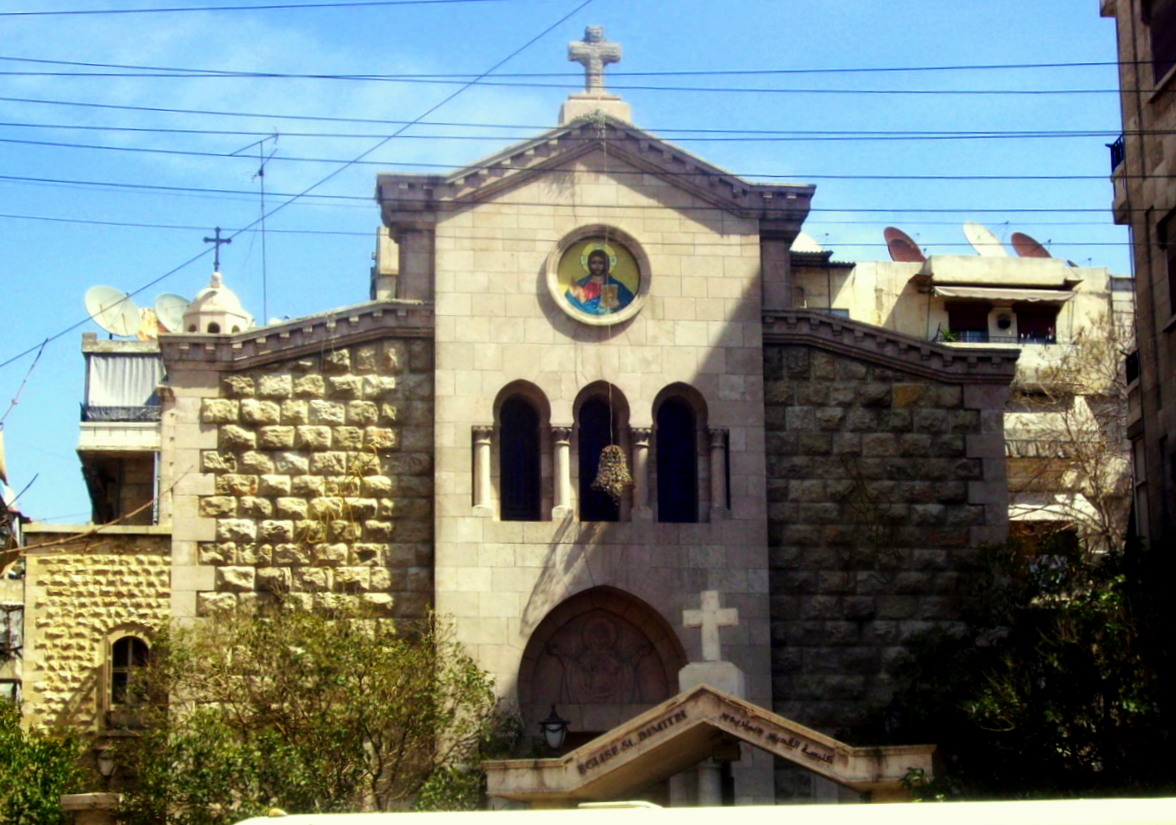
Saint Demetrius Church

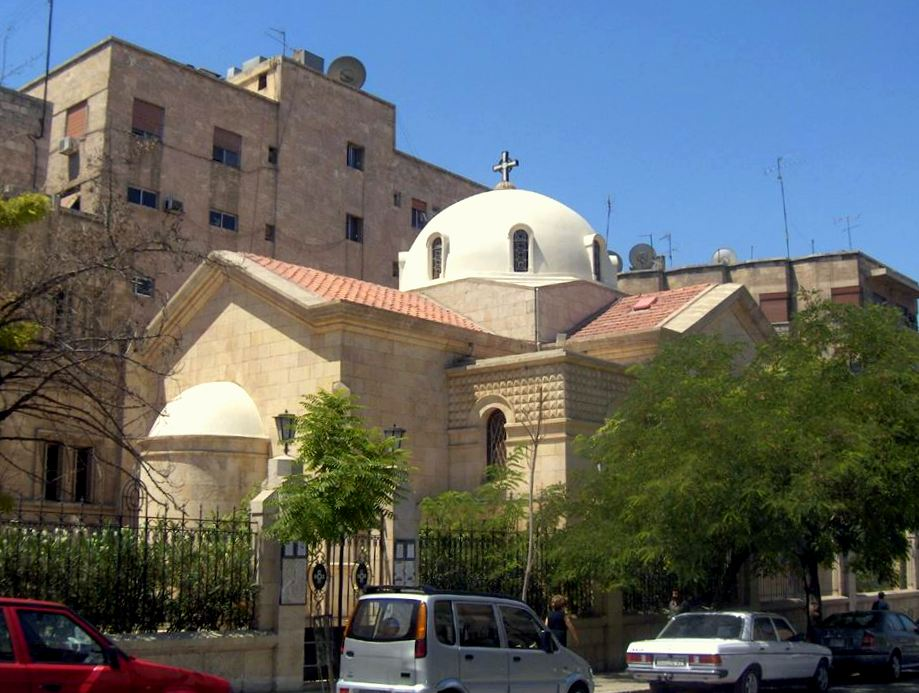
Saint Michael the Archangel Church

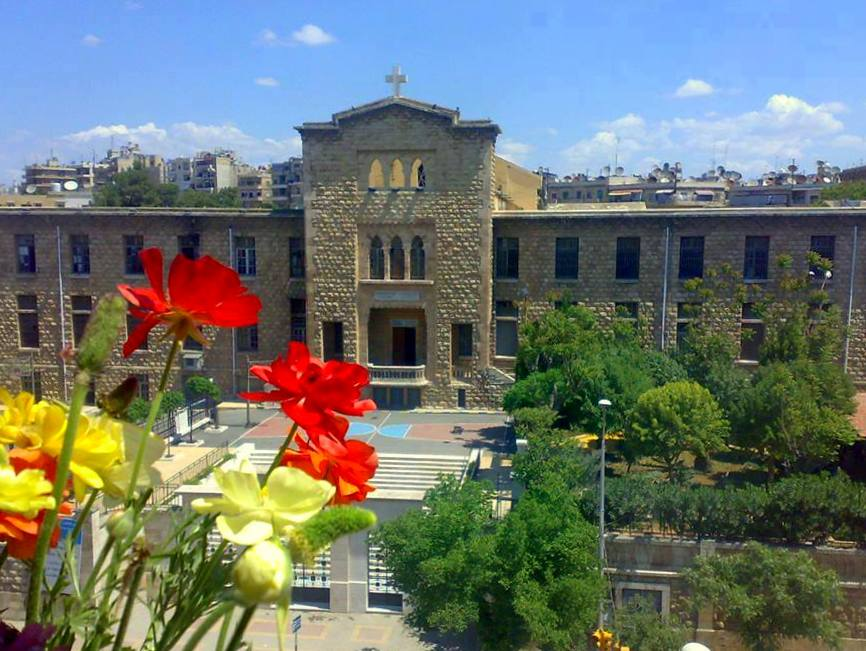
Saint Matilda Church

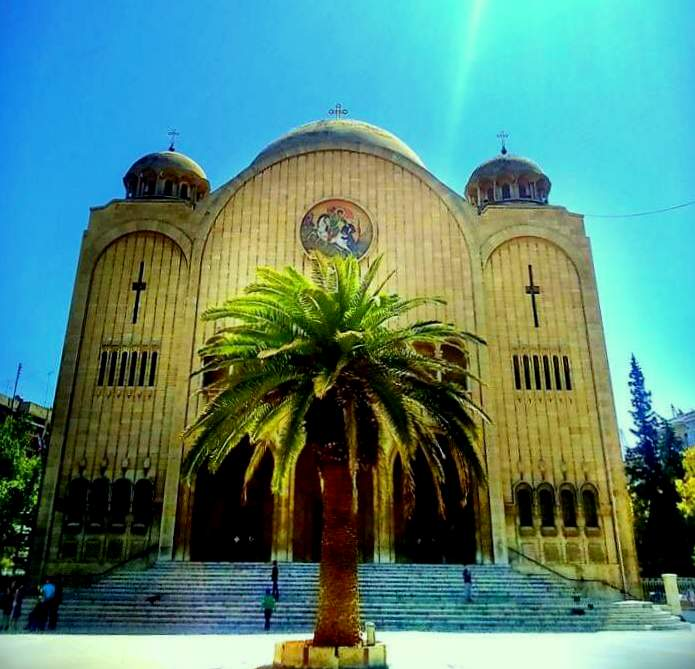
Saint George's Church

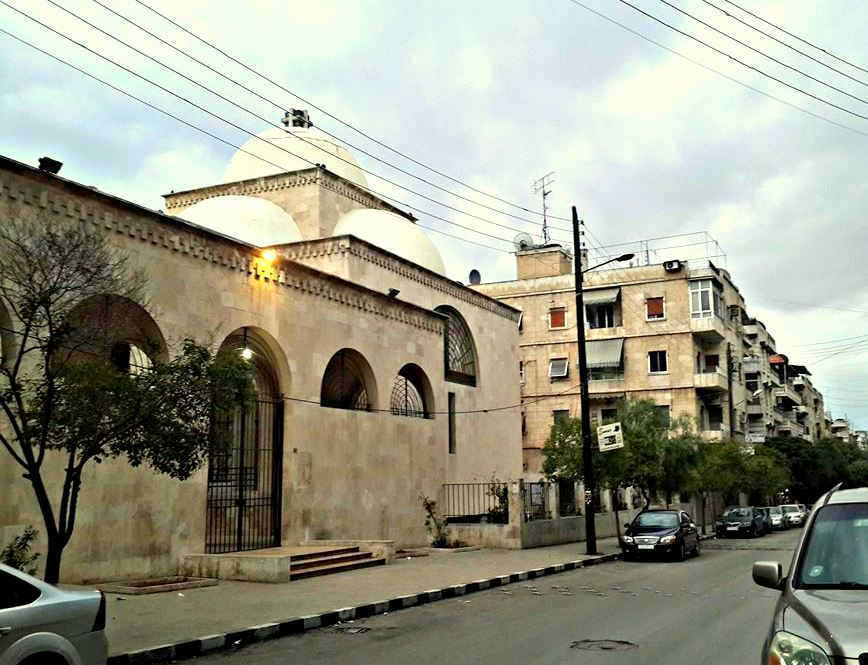
Saint Theresa Church

== Latin rite churches ==
- Latin Church, Apostolic Vicariate of Aleppo

Name	Consecration year	Notes
Church of the Missionaries of the Sacred Hearts of Jesus and Mary	1891	
Church of Saint Bonaventure	1910	The church suffered minor damages on March 18, 2012, after a car bomb claimed by the Free Syrian Army.
Church of Mary of the Passion of the Franciscan Missionaries of Mary and Monastery	1932	
Saint Vartan's Church and Monastery	1936	Frequently targeted by the rebels in 2012-15, suffered major damages after being attacked by the Turkmen Sultan Murad Division in April 2015.
Saint Francis of Assisi Church	1937	Consecrated on October 10, 1937 to serve as the seat of Apostolic Vicariate of Aleppo between until 2011.
Church and Monastery of the Society of Jesus	1955	Slightly damaged after being shelled by the rebels in January 2016.
Church of Saint Anthony of Padua of the Holy Land Monastery		Named after Saint Anthony of Padua.
Church of Jesus the Worker of the Carmelite Monastery	1977	
Church of Our Lady of Annunciation		
Cathedral of the Child Jesus	2011	Became the seat of the Apostolic Vicariate of Aleppo upon its consecration on January 15, 2011.

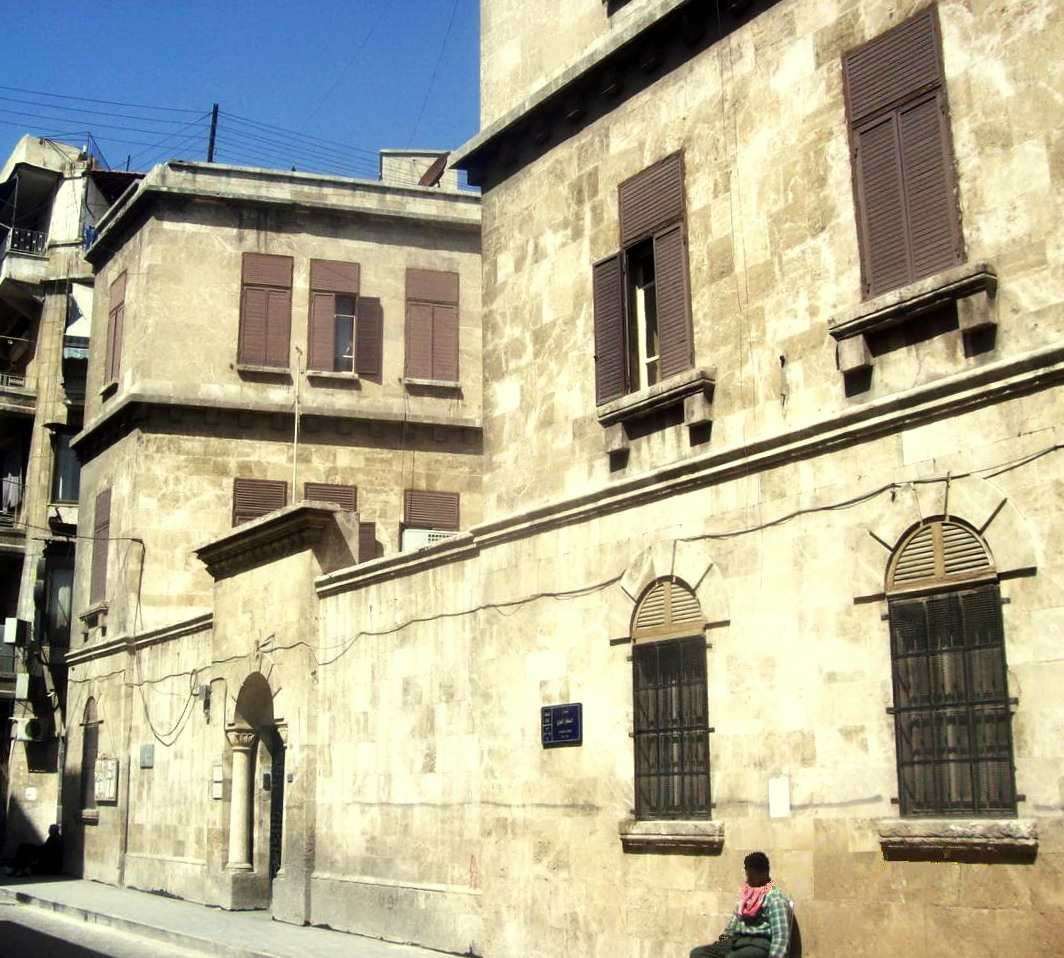
Church of the Missionaries of the Sacred Hearts of Jesus and Mary

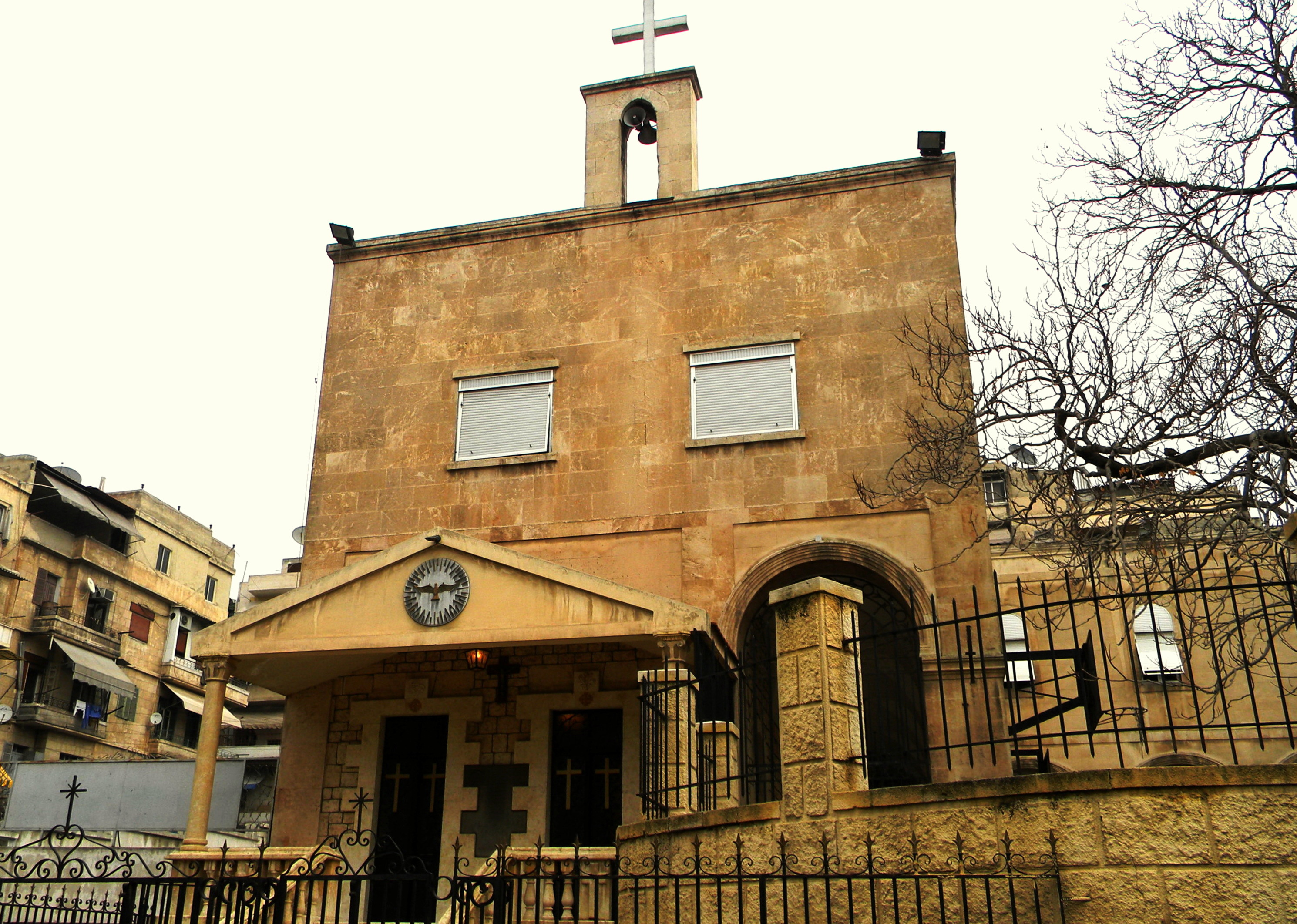
Church of Saint Bonaventure

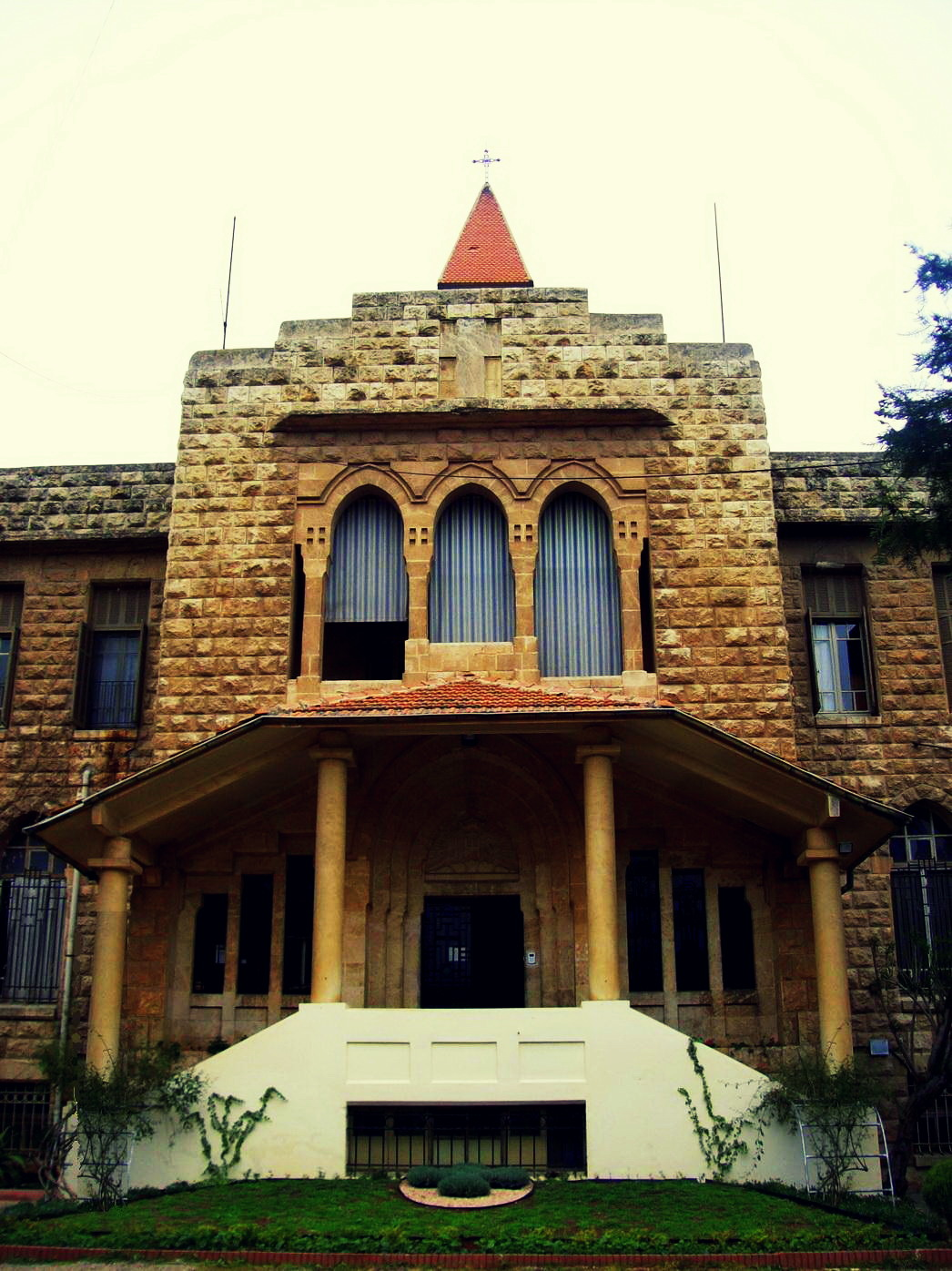
Church of Mary of the Passion of the Franciscan Missionaries of Mary Monastery

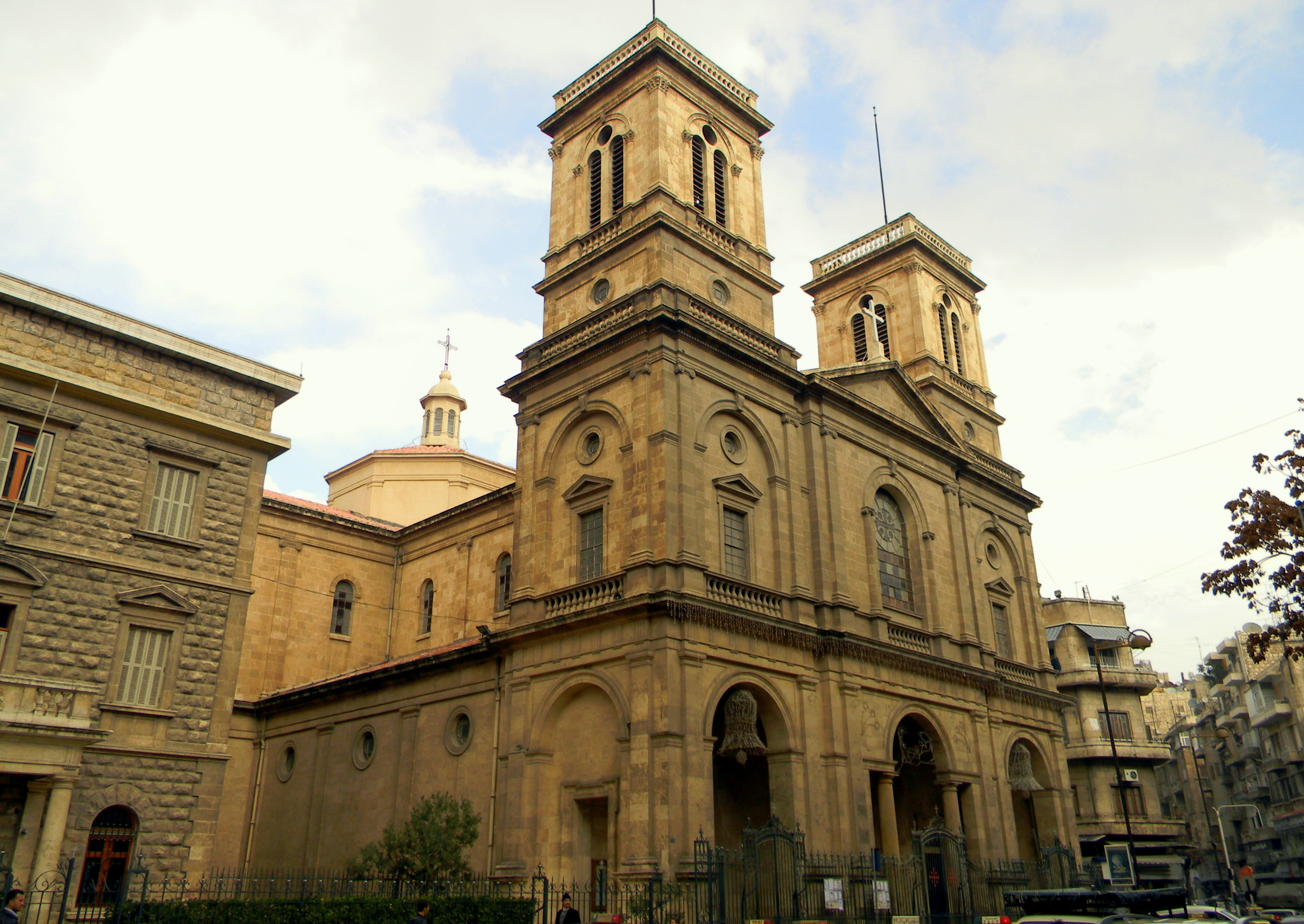
Saint Francis of Assisi Church

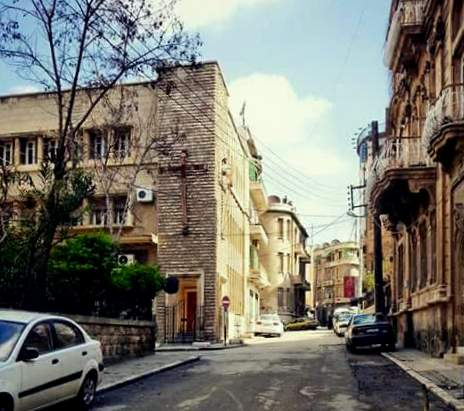
Church and Monastery of the Society of Jesus

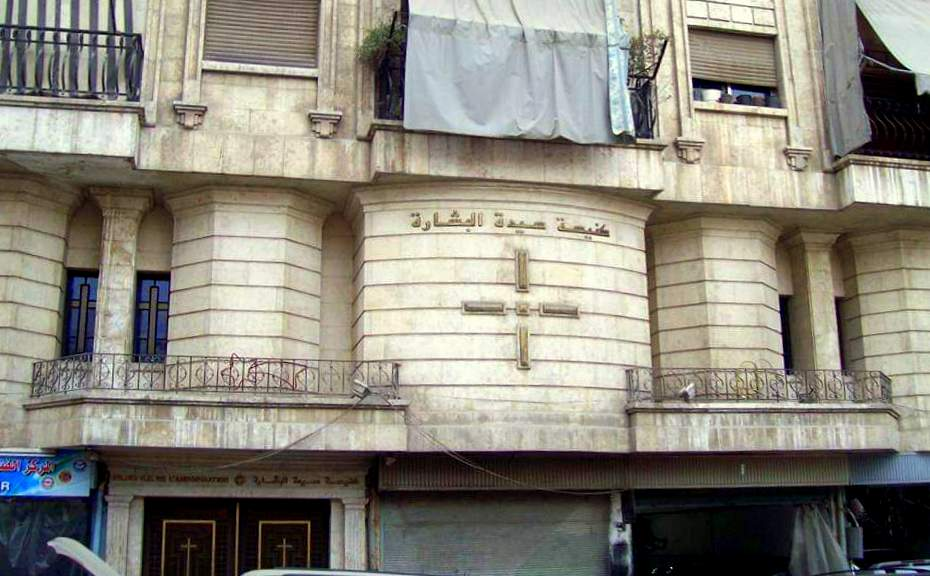
Church of Our Lady of Annunciation

== Arab Evangelical churches ==
- National Evangelical Synod of Syria and Lebanon (Arab National Presbyterian Church)

Name	Consecration year	Notes
National Evangelical Church of Aleppo	1848	Located in the Jdayde quarter, served as the seat of the congregation until the break-up of the Battle of Aleppo, when two-thirds of the church building was destroyed by the rebels, through an underground explosion on November 6, 2012. In 2021, a comprehensive renovation of the church began.
National Presbyterian Church of Aleppo	2015	Located in the Suleimaniyeh-Villat quarter, the church became the seat of the congregation upon its consecration on December 25, 2015, after a construction period of less than 1 year.

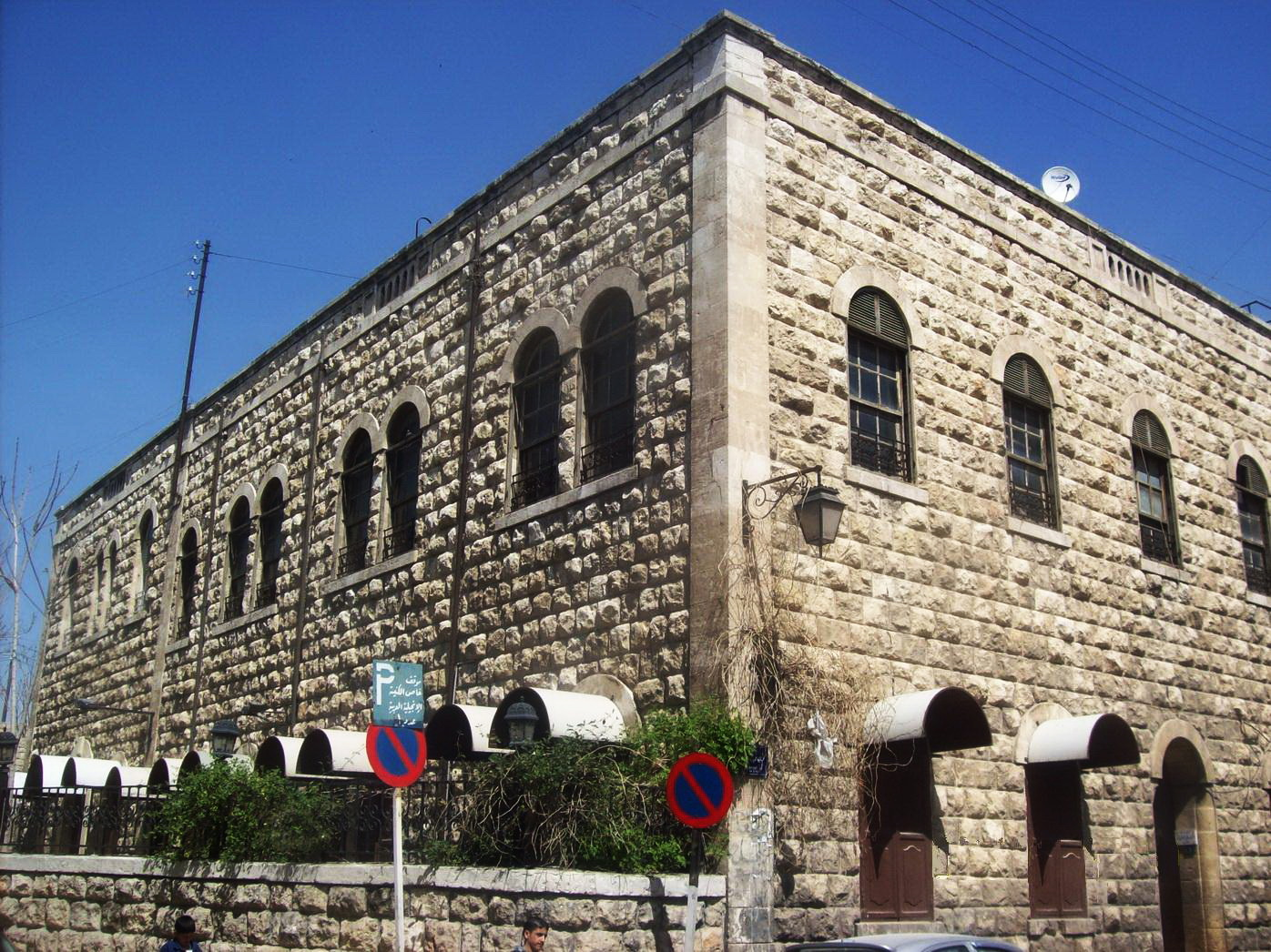
National Evangelical Church of Aleppo (old church)

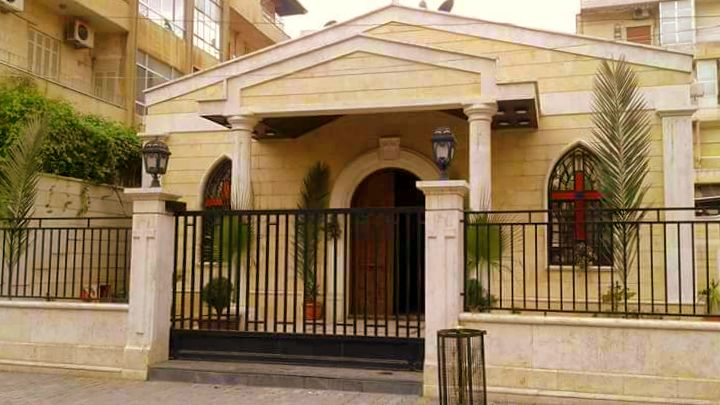
National Evangelical Church of Aleppo (new church)
- Christian Evangelical Alliance of Syria

Name	Consecration year	Notes
Church of Jesus Light for All Nations (Nour el-Alam)	1985	Occupying the ground floor of an apartment building, the church was opened in 1985, in the Suleymaniyeh-Villat quarter of Aleppo.

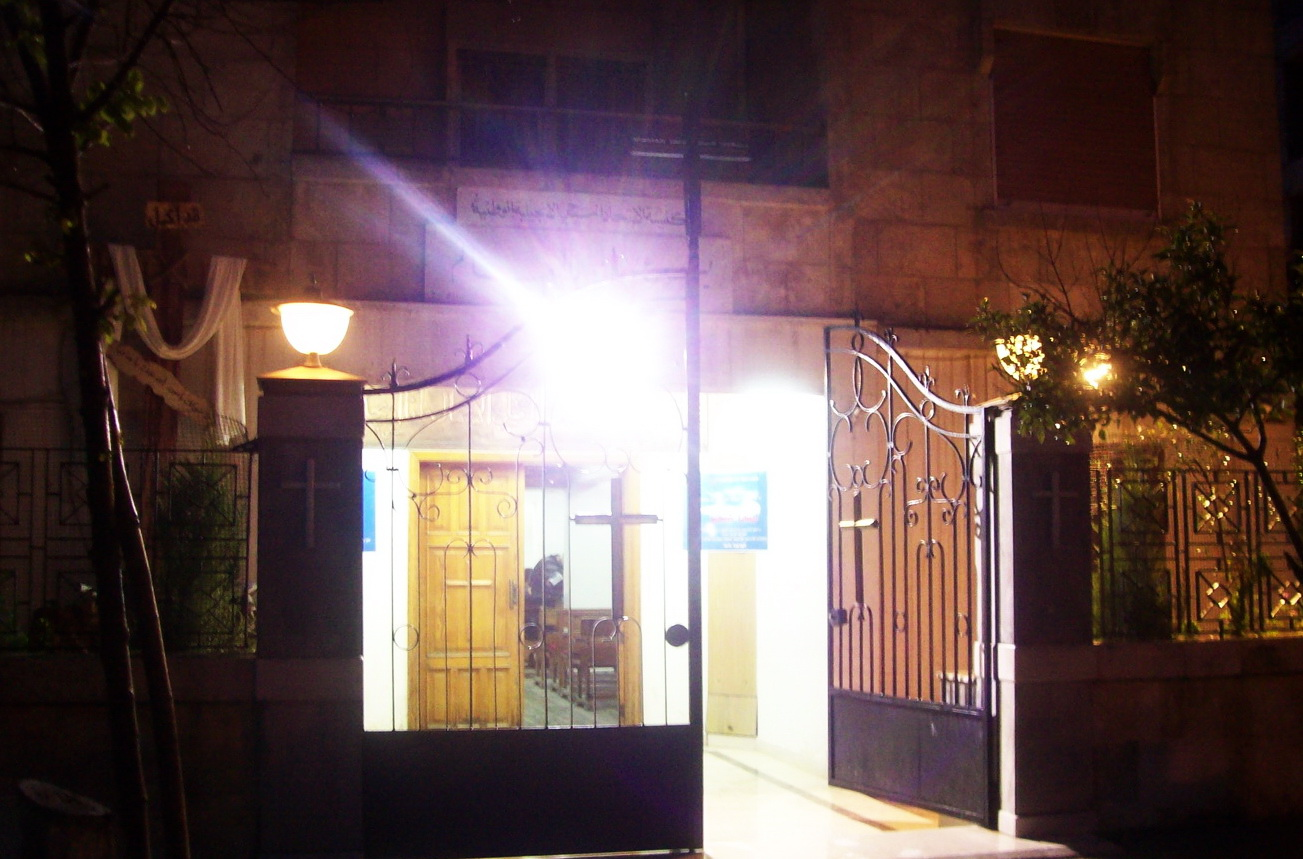
Church of Jesus Light for All Nations (Nour el-Alam)
- Christian Baptist Alliance of Syria

Name	Consecration year	Notes
Aleppo Baptist Evangelical Church	2003	Occupying the ground floor of an apartment building in the New Syriac quarter since January 2003, the church sustained serious damages as a result of a rocket hit by the armed opposition groups on May 15, 2014.
