= Union of the Armenian Evangelical Churches in the Near East =

Group of Armenian Evangelical churches

The logo of the Union of the Armenian Evangelical Churches in the Near East

The Union of the Armenian Evangelical Churches in the Near East (Armenian: Մերձաւոր Արեւելքի Հայ Աւետարանական Եկեղեցիներու Միութիւն, ՄԱՀԱԵՄ), abbreviated as UAECNE, is an autonomous body of Armenian Evangelical churches comprising 25 congregations throughout Lebanon, Syria, Turkey, Greece, Egypt, Iran, Iraq and Australia.

== History ==
=== Origin ===
Beginning in the second decade of the 19th century as an indigenous reform movement within the Armenian Apostolic Church, it developed into an independent community in 1846 in Istanbul to become known as the Armenian Evangelical Church and in subsequent decades registered a membership of 60,000 throughout the Ottoman Empire. After the First World War, when the Armenian population was devastated and the remnant deported from its historic homeland in what is now called Turkey, the Union was reorganized in Syria and Lebanon. The Union is composed of autonomous congregations. Its organizational pattern is a kind of modified congregationalism. The annual convention of the Union is the highest authority, presided by Rev. Megerdich Karageozian. The central committee of 12 members, elected at the convention, acts as an administrative body supervising and coordinating the activities of the member churches and church related institutions.

From its inception, the Armenian Evangelical Church has stressed the importance of education. It now operates more than 20 schools, four of them being high schools and also owns the only university in the diaspora: Haigazian University, member of the Association of International Colleges and Universities-Europe Inc., with an enrollment of 650 students. It operates four conference centers in Syria, Lebanon, Iran and Turkey. Together with the Arabic-speaking Evangelical churches, the Union owns and operates a secondary school in Aleppo and the Near East School of Theology in Beirut (the latter also supported by foreign missionary agencies). With the Armenian Apostolic and Armenian Catholic Catholicossates it operates the old people's homes in Aleppo and Beirut, and a sanatorium in Azounieh, Lebanon.

It has developed ecumenical ties with several churches and fraternal relations with the Armenian Evangelical Union of North America, the Armenian Evangelical Union of France and the Armenian Evangelical Union of Armenia. In spite of grave problems of emigrations and persecution, the Union continues to function with a growing awareness of its mission in its territories. The church is a member of the World Communion of Reformed Churches

=== Establishment ===
The Lebanon-based Armenian Evangelical Union of the Near East, established in 1924, is one of the oldest among the five Unions that comprise the Armenian Evangelical Church. It is a union of over two dozen churches and congregations in seven countries in the Middle East and one church in Australia, as the origin of the Sydney church is traced back to Lebanon and Syria. Each member church in the Union is independent in its internal affairs; however, certain Union-wide functions are centralized, such as the screening of candidates for the ministry. New recruits study at the Near East School of Theology, and at Haigazian University.

Unlike those in other parts of the world, the Armenian Evangelicals in Lebanon, as part of the Evangelical Denomination of Lebanon [Taefa Protestant], are one of the officially recognized communities in the country’s sectarian political system. “The Denomination has wide cooperation with the Armenian Evangelical community and is much closer to the Armenian milieu,” says Rev. Megerdich Karageozian, President of the Near East Union, “but legally and formally we are part of the Evangelical Denomination of Lebanon.”

The Denomination is guaranteed one seat in the Lebanese Parliament. From 1972 to 2000s the “Protestant MP” had been an Armenian. In the past Antranik Manoogian, Nourjan Demirjian, and Abraham Dedeyan served as MPs; currently Edgard Traboulsi represents the interests of all the Evangelicals in Lebanon...

“An estimated five percent of Armenians in Lebanon are Evangelicals,” says Rev. Karageozian. “Currently that is probably around 5-6,000 members.” Over the last two decades, thousands have left Lebanon depleting the human and financial resources of the church. Especially during the Lebanese Civil War, “50 percent of our congregation emigrated,” says Rev. Karageozian.

The Union closed two schools in Zahleh and Tripoli due to lack of students and difficult financial conditions and two other schools in Beirut; including The Armenian Evangelical Guertmenian School in 2015. But the community continues to educate around 1,350 students (as of 17/18 school year) in Four Secondary and One Middle School in Lebanon, with help from endowment funds. Before the beginning of the war, the Evangelical schools had more than 5,000 students in their schools. “The economic well-being of the population has been disrupted because of the war and emigration.” He explains that the community expects the Union to provide scholarships and cover the cost of every student who attends their schools. “In the past, a $100 scholarship meant a lot, but today an upper class student costs about $2000,” he explains.

But the pride of the Armenian Evangelical Church is the Haigazian University, the only higher education institution in the Diaspora.

== Presidents ==
- Rev. Megerdich Karageozian (1998-current)
- Rev. Dr. Hovannes Karjian (1992-1998)
- Rev. Dr. Hovannes Aharonian (1972-1985)

== Member churches of the Union of the Armenian Evangelical Churches in the Near East ==
=== Australia ===
- Armenian Evangelical Uniting Church of Sydney

=== Cyprus ===
- Armenian Evangelical Fellowship of Cyprus (Nicosia)

=== Egypt ===
- Armenian Evangelical Church of Alexandria

=== Greece ===
- Armenian Evangelical Church of Kokkinia
- Armenian Evangelical Church of Dergouty

=== Iran ===
- Sourp Hovhannes Armenian Evangelical Church of Tehran
- Hokeshounch Armenian Evangelical Church of Tehran
- Shnorhali Armenian Evangelical Church of Tehran

=== Iraq ===
- Armenian Evangelical Church of Baghdad

=== Lebanon ===
- Armenian Evangelical Church of Anjar
- Armenian Evangelical Church of Ashrafieh
- First Armenian Evangelical Church
- Armenian Evangelical Emmanuel Church of Amanos
- Nor Marash Armenian Evangelical church
- Syriac Evangelical Church of Jdeideh

=== Syria ===
- Martyrs' Church, Aleppo
- Bethel Church, Aleppo
- Emmanuel Church, Aleppo
- Church of Christ, Aleppo
- Syriac Evangelical Church of Aleppo
- Armenian Evangelical Church of Damascus
- Armenian Evangelical Church of Homs
- Holy Trinity Church, Kessab
- Armenian Evangelical Church of Ekizolouk, Kessab
- Armenian Evangelical Church of Keorkuneh, Kessab
- Armenian Evangelical Church of Karadouran, Kessab

=== Turkey ===
- Armenian Evangelical Church of Gedikpaşa, Kumkapı, Istanbul
- Armenian Evangelical Church of Beyoğlu, Istanbul

== Institutions, Instrumentalities and Offices ==
- Ք.Ջ. երիտասարդաց (Christian Endeavor Union)
- ՔՋԱԿ, Armenian Christian Endeavor Summer Camp (KCHAG)
- Haigazian University
- Centers for the Armenian Handicapped of Lebanon
- Community Councils of Lebanon and Syria
- Constitution Committee
- Educational Councils of Syria and Lebanon
- Publications Office
- AREVIG Day Care Center for Armenian Retarded Children, Aleppo (ecumenical)
- Bethel Polyclinic, Aleppo
- CAHL - Armenian Elderly Home
