= Armenian American Museum =

Museum in Glendale, California, USA

Armenian American Museum and Cultural Center of California
- Interactive fullscreen map
- Established: 2014
- Location: Glendale, California
- Coordinates: 34.14332°N 118.25456°W
- Type: History and culture of Armenian Americans
- Architect: Alajajian-Marcoosi Architects
- Website: armenianamericanmuseum.org

The Armenian American Museum and Cultural Center of California is a museum located in Glendale, California, United States, dedicated to preserving the history and culture of Armenian-Americans. The museum is anticipated to complete construction in late 2026.

== History ==
=== Early years ===
==== Impetus ====
In 2014, during planning of commemorations for the 100th anniversary of the Armenian Genocide, the Armenian Genocide Centennial Committee – Western USA (AGCC – WUSA) met with officials from the city of Glendale, California to discuss the establishment of a museum.

In 2015, the museum's board of trustees was established, entrusting the governance of the project to ten Armenian American cultural, philanthropic, and religious non-profit organizations. The Board of Trustees includes the Armenian Catholic Eparchy, Armenian Cultural Foundation, Armenian Evangelical Union of North America, Armenian General Benevolent Union Western District, Armenian Missionary Association of America, Armenian Relief Society Western USA, Nor Or Charitable Foundation, Nor Serount Cultural Association, Western Diocese of the Armenian Church of North America and Western Prelacy of the Armenian Apostolic Church.

==== Site selection and museum design ====
In 2015, four museum designs, by Yazdani Studio of Cannon Design, Belzberg Architects, Frederick Fisher and Partners, and Alajajian-Marcoosi Architects, were shortlisted. The original location was intended to be a city-owned parking lot near Glendale Community College, but in 2018, the Glendale City Council approved the design of the museum and directed City staff to negotiate a ground lease agreement for a new site at Central Park. City Council also approved schematic designs for an $18.5-million makeover of Central Park.

Funding for the construction of the museumn included state funds secured by state Assemblymember Laura Friedman and state Senator Anthony Portantino.

==== Construction ====
A ceremonial groundbreaking was held in July 2021. In November 2022, the museum celebrated the completion of the first phase of construction, featuring the parking garage and building foundation. Structural steel fabrication commenced in December 2023, and the first structural steel beams were erected in January 2024.

In October 2024, the museum held a festival at the neighboring Glendale Central Library, featuring musicians including Tigran Asatryan and Joseph Krikorian. Mayor Elen Asatryan delivered remarks reaffirming the City of Glendale’s long-standing partnership with the museum, noting the importance of such an institution in fostering education, unity, and cultural pride.

The concrete pour for the building's roof deck was completed in February 2025. The 36 letters of the Armenian alphabet are featured in the museum. The "hazarashen" skylight (inspired by traditional home roofs in Armenia) was installed in September 2025, and the building's steel facade — created by architectural metal manufacturer Zahner — was installed shortly thereafter.

== Architecture ==
=== Building ===
The museum is housed in a new building designed by architecture firm Alajajian-Marcoosi Architects. Its engraved steel facade, created by architectural metal manufacturer Zahner, simultaneously references both Mount Ararat, which is a national symbol for the Armenian people, and the Verdugo Mountains, which surround the city of Glendale.

The 58,000 square-foot, two-story museum will house permanent and temporary exhibition galleries on its upper level, and a lobby, auditorium, offices, and other functions on the ground floor. The lobby is illuminated by a skylight.

=== Plaza ===
The backside of the museum is designed to open onto a new central plaza designed by SWA Group. The updated park will include features such as an amphitheater, a children's playground and a splash pad.

The plaza will connect the museum with the Downtown Central Library and the city's adult recreation center, and an existing promenade will lead to the Museum of Neon Art and the Americana at Brand.

== Exhibits ==
During the museum's acquisition of exhibits, Executive Chairman Berdj Karapetian stated that “The Armenian culture and history will be the main focus, but we are also planning to present other nations living in California. The Armenian American Museum is going to be a center presenting the Armenian identity and an important circle of cultural cooperation.”

The museum's Permanent Exhibition Committee includes scholars from UCLA Armenian Studies, the USC Institute of Armenian Studies, CSUN Armenian Studies, and the USC Shoah Foundation. The Schematic Design phase of the Permanent Exhibition is led by exhibition design firm Gallagher & Associates.

=== Permanent exhibition ===
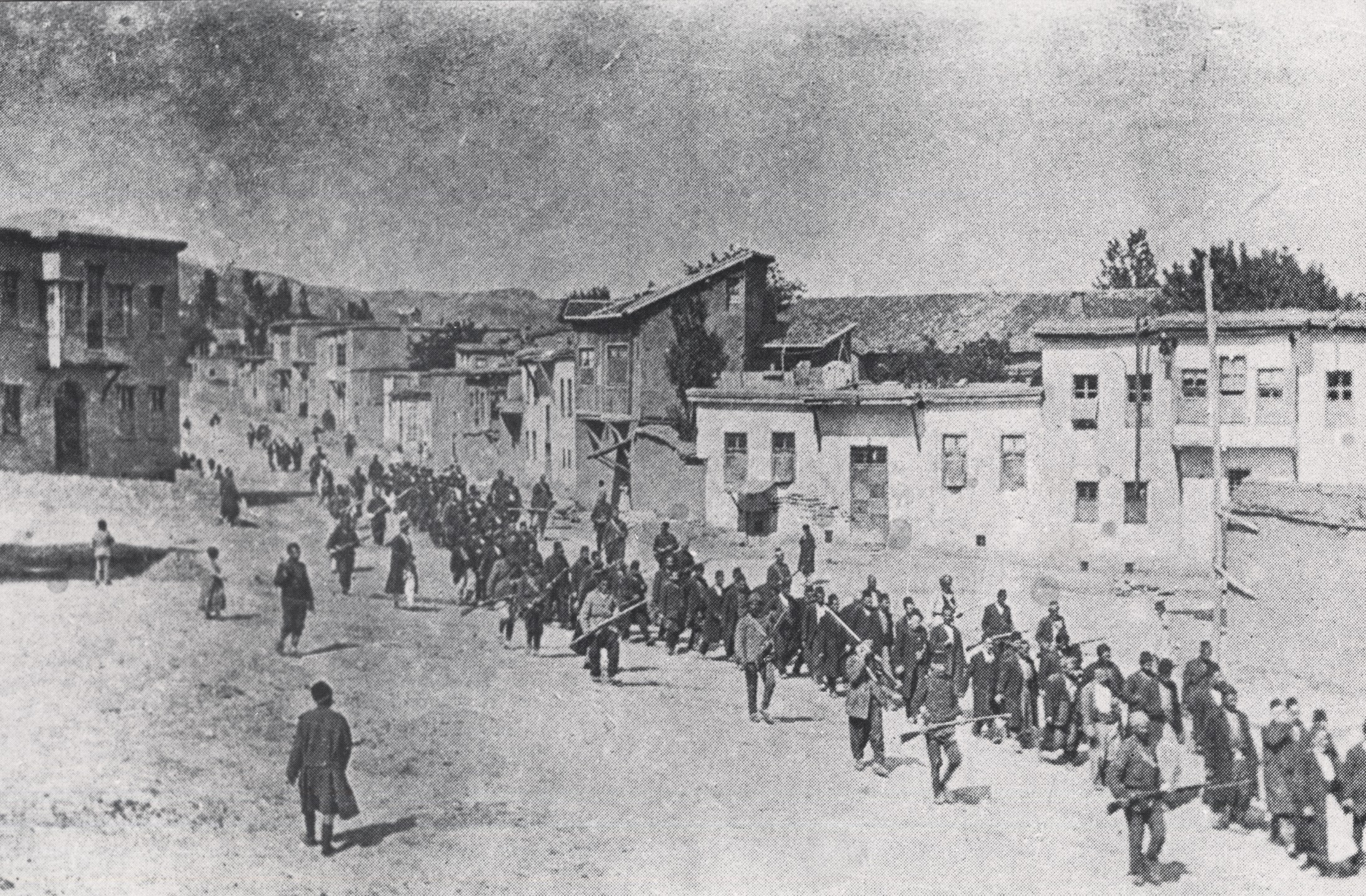
Ottoman military forces march Armenian men from Kharput to an execution site outside the city (March–June 1915).

==== Armenian Genocide ====
Oral histories, including those of genocide survivors, will be critical to telling the story of Armenians, per Shushan Karapetian, deputy director of the USC Institute of Armenian Studies, and a member of the museum's permanent exhibition committee. These accounts will likely include survivor interviews preserved by the USC Shoah Foundation. Sedda Antekelian, an education and outreach specialist with the Shoah Foundation, and another member of the museum's permanent exhibition committee, has stated that oral histories that may be included can give voice to more contemporary issues, like the dual identity of Armenian Americans.

=== Temporary exhibitions ===
The temporary exhibition galleries will host exhibitions on diverse cultures, subject matters, and experiences to serve as a multicultural bridge.

=== Auditorium ===
The Auditorium will present public programming including performances, lectures, film screenings, and special events.

=== Learning center ===
The Learning Center will feature state-of-the-art classrooms and offer educational programs for visitors.

=== Demonstration kitchen ===
The Demonstration Kitchen will provide interactive cooking experiences.

== Management ==
=== Governance ===
==== Executive Team ====
The Executive Team provides leadership, strategic planning, and operational support to advance the mission and vision of the Armenian American Museum.

- Berdj Karapetian (executive chairman)
- Zaven Kazazian (executive vice chairman)

==== Board of trustees ====
The Armenian American Museum's board of trustees is composed of ten Armenian American cultural, philanthropic, and religious non-profit organizations who have united in common cause for a landmark center that will serve the entire community.

- Armenian Catholic Eparchy of Our Lady of Nareg
- Armenian Cultural Foundation
- Armenian Evangelical Union of North America
- Armenian General Benevolent Union, Western District
- Armenian Missionary Association of America
- Armenian Relief Society Western USA
- Nor Or Charitable Foundation
- Nor Serount Cultural Association
- Western Diocese of the Armenian Church of North America
- Western Prelacy of the Armenian Apostolic Church

== Community Involvement ==
=== Young Leaders Council ===
In 2022, the museum launched its Young Professionals Committee to promote the mission of the museum and to connect young professionals. The committee was later renamed the Young Leaders Council. In 2024, the group started a speaker series which features prominent members of the Armenian American community.

== See also ==
- Armenian Library and Museum of America
- History Museum of Armenia
- Tsitsernakaberd
