= Immanuel Armenian Congregational Church =

Church in Los Angeles, California, US

- Website: immanuelacc.org

History
- Founded: 1930

The Immanuel Armenian Congregational Church was founded in 1930 in Los Angeles, California, with the first building on Washington Boulevard. The founding minister was Rev. Aram Yeretzian. It is among the oldest extant California congregations of the Armenian Evangelical Union of North America.

The church relocated to Downey, California in 1979, to the former home of the Downey Congregational Church, its current location.

== Pastors ==
- Rev. Aram Yeretzian (1930-1938)
- Rev. Dr. Samuel Halajian (1939-1952)
- Rev. Ardavazd Minassian (1952-1959)
- Rev. Siragan Agbabian (1960)
- Rev. Mardiros Marganian (1960-1975)
- Rev. Jirair Sogomian (1976-1979)
- Rev. Edward Tovmassian (1979-1986)
- Rev. Dr. Herald Hassessian (1987-1991)
- Rev. Daniel Albarian (1987-1991)
- Visiting pastors and preachers (1991-1994)
- Rev. Joseph Matossian (1994-2004)
- Rev. Jirair Sogomian (2004-2011)
- Rev. Vatche Ekmekjian (2011–2019)
- Rev. George Terian (2019–present)
