= Emmanuel Church, Aleppo =

Church in Aleppo, Syria

Emmanuel Church
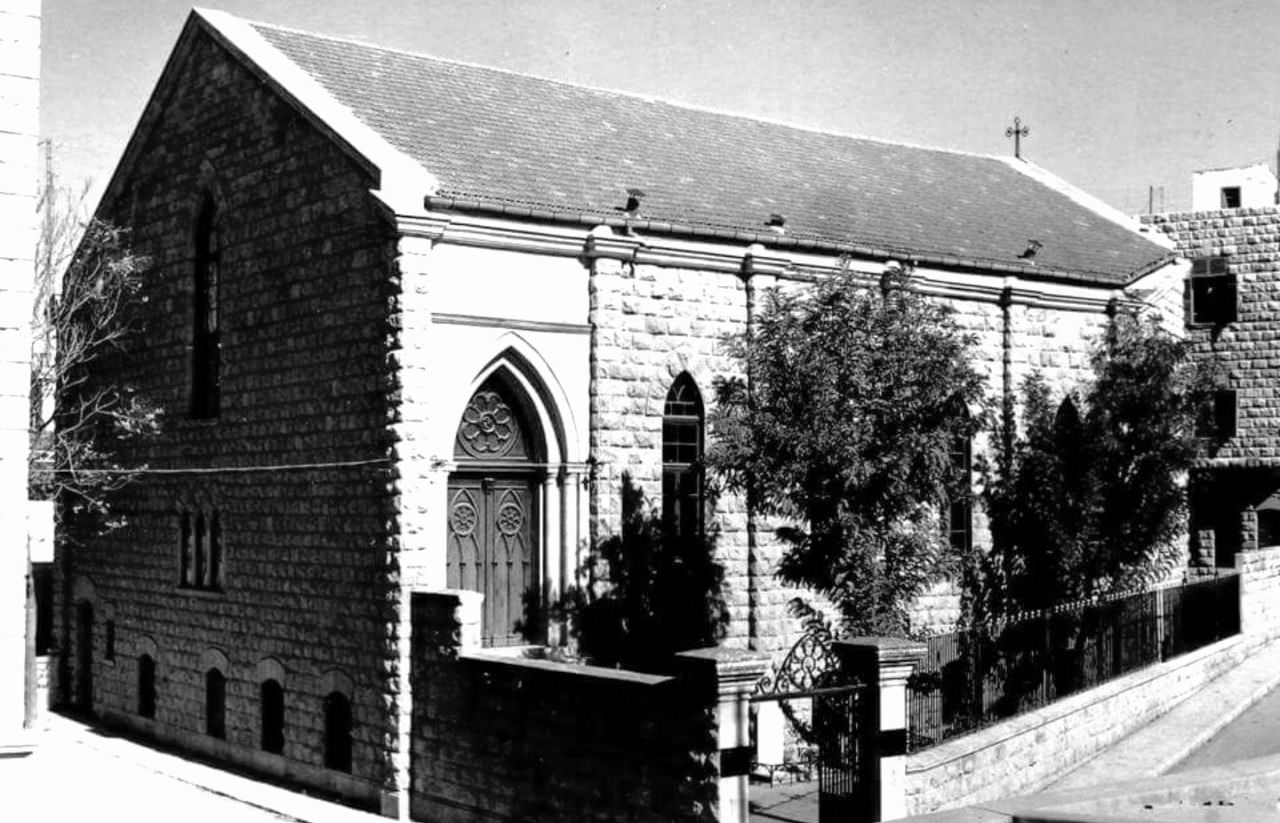
- Emmanuel Church in 1950

Religion
- Affiliation: Armenian Evangelical Church
- Year consecrated: 1923

Location
- Location: Aleppo, Syria
- Interactive map of Emmanuel Church
- Coordinates: 36°12′28.5″N 37°09′2″E

Architecture
- Type: Church

Armenian Evangelical Emmanuel Church is an Armenian Evangelical Church in Aleppo, Syria. The congregation was established in 1852 and the church was erected in 1923 and serves as the seat of the Armenian Evangelical congregation in Syria, which is a member of the Union of the Armenian Evangelical Churches in the Near East.

Emmanuel Church was damaged after being shelled by rebels on 17 January 2016.
