= First Armenian Evangelical Church =

The First Armenian Evangelical Church (Հայ Աւետարանական Ա. Եկեղեցի) is the first church founded in Lebanon by Armenian Evangelicals, in February 1922. It is located at the heart of Beirut, Mexique Street, Kantari. It serves the Armenian community by holding worship services and supports Yeprem and Martha Pilibossian Armenian Evangelical College since 1943. Its current pastor is Reverend Gerard Ghazarian.

== History ==
Many Armenian Evangelicals who had settled in Beirut during the years 1914-1918 held worship services in the Dale Memorial Hall of the Presbyterian Mission. In February 1922, a Church board was elected, being the first step towards the establishment of a church. Between the years 1922 and 1926 a large number of Armenian refugees that had survived the Armenian genocide settled in Beirut and lived in the outskirts of the city under extremely poor conditions. At that time the number of Evangelicals reached 2000, while the number of communicant members was 670. For some time two churches were operating under the name of Armenian Evangelical First Church- one in East Beirut and one in West Beirut. In 1926 these two churches started to function independently of each other, and the church functioning in the outskirts of Beirut later moved to Ashrafieh. The First Armenian Evangelical Church had 103 families ( a total of 488 individuals) and 150 communicant members. Until 1949 they held their services in different places. In that year, the church bought a property on Mexique Street and the building of a sanctuary took about 10 years.

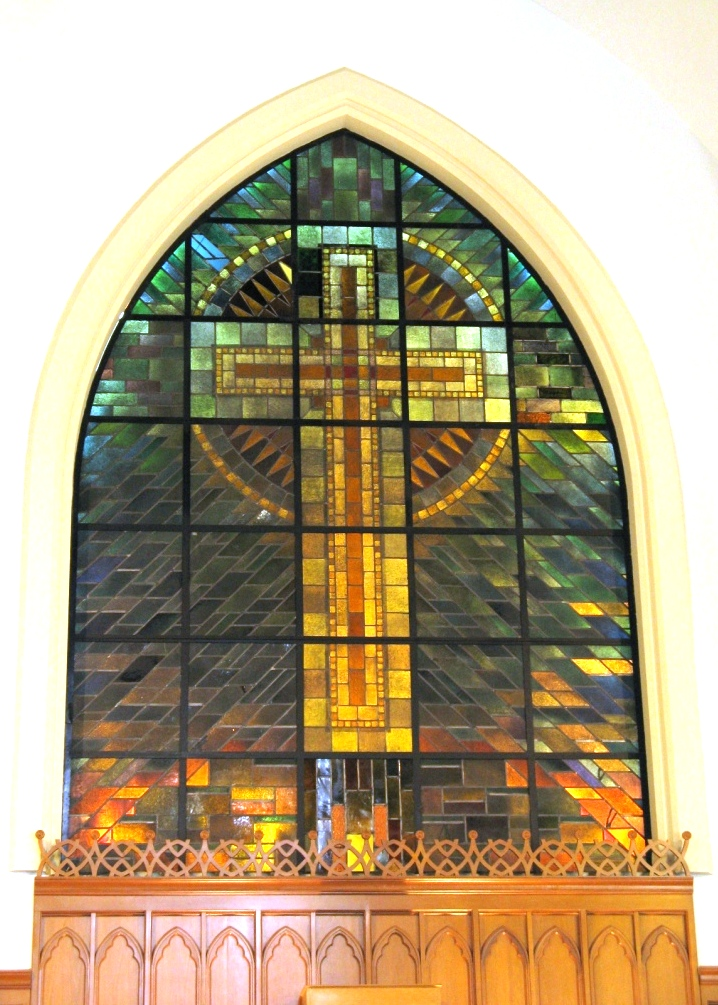
The Cross inside the church
