= Martyrs' Church, Aleppo =

Martyrs' Church
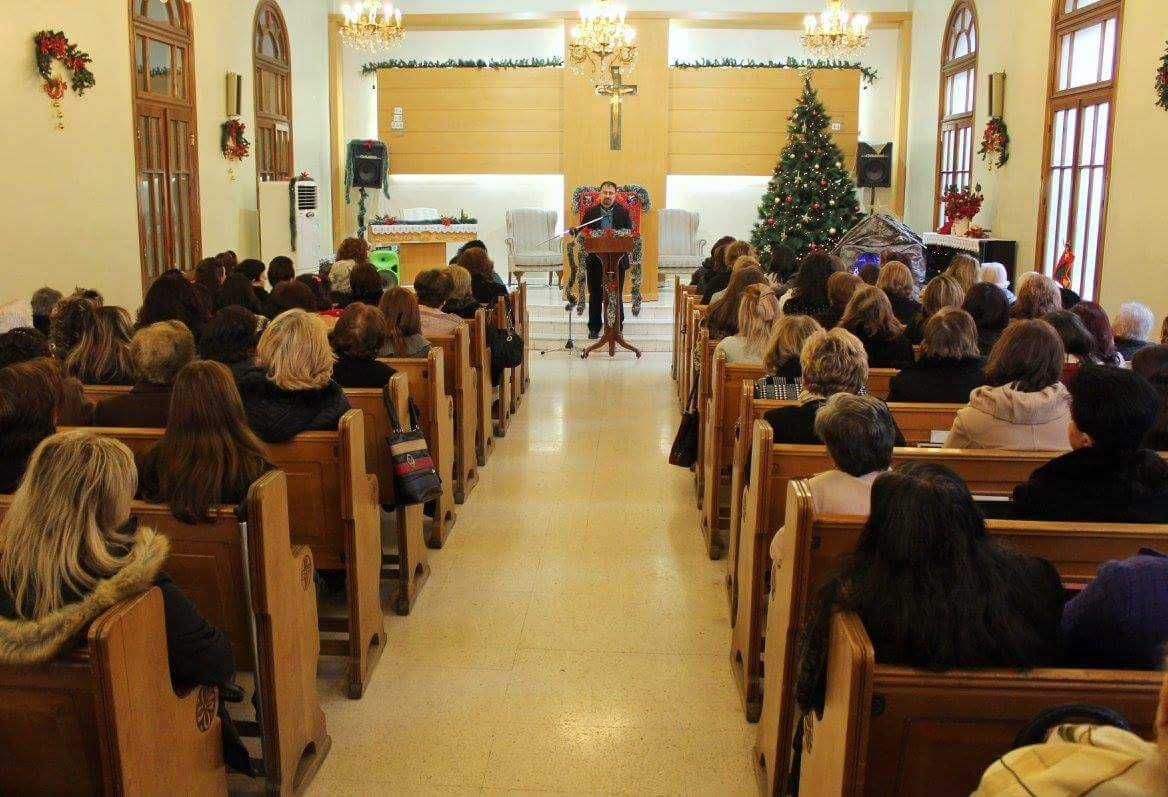
- Martyrs' Church, 26 December 2017

Religion
- Affiliation: Armenian Evangelical Church
- Year consecrated: 1931

Location
- Location: Al-Suleimaniyeh, Aleppo, Syria
- Interactive map of Martyrs' Church
- Coordinates: 36°13′9″N 37°09′45.5″E

Architecture
- Type: Church

Martyrs' Church (Nahadagats Church) (Arabic: كنيسة الشهداء; Western Armenian: Նահատակաց եկեղեցի) is an Armenian Evangelical Church in Aleppo, Syria. It is a member of Union of the Armenian Evangelical Churches in the Near East (UAECNE).
