= Bethel Church, Aleppo =

Bethel Church
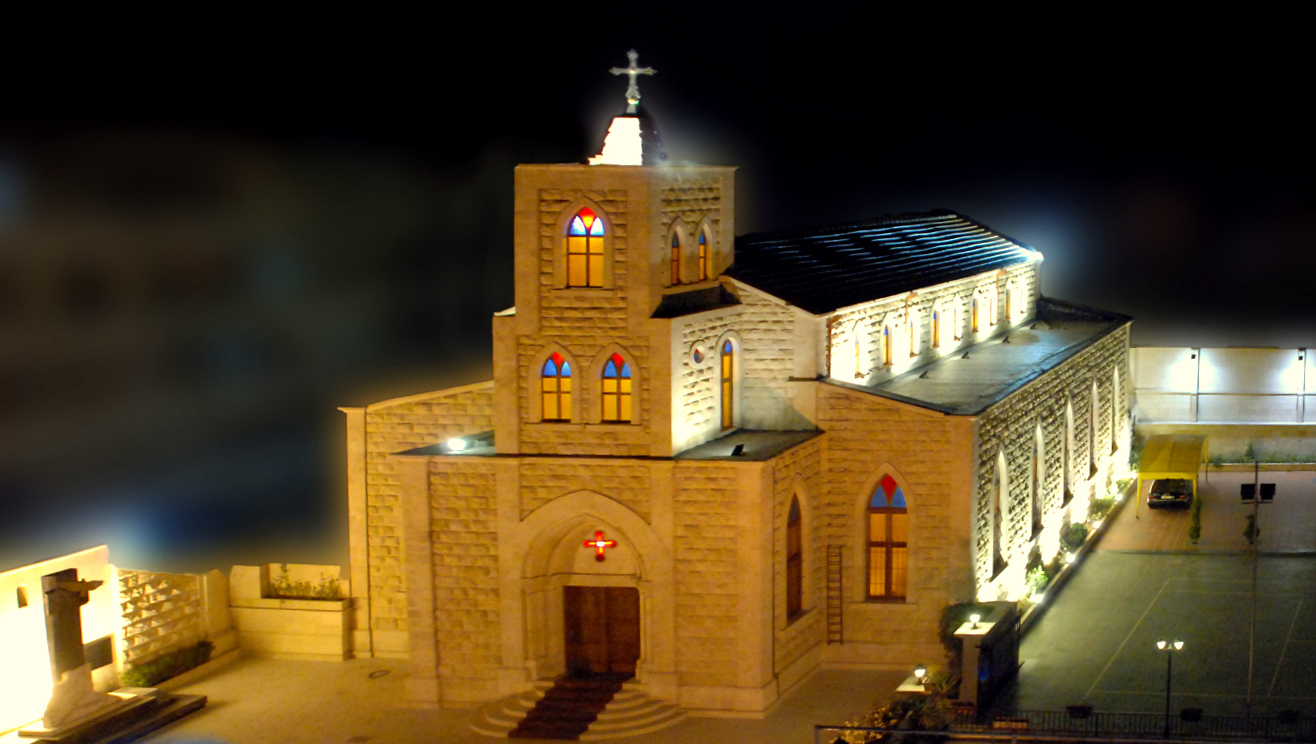
- Bethel Church
- 36°12′59″N 37°09′45″E
- Location: Aleppo
- Country: Syria
- Denomination: Armenian Evangelical Church
- Website: petel.org

History
- Dedicated: 1934-37
- Consecrated: 1937

Clergy
- Pastor: Haroutune Selimian

Bethel Church (Arabic: كنيسة بيت إيل; Armenian: Բեթելի եկեղեցի) is an Armenian Evangelical Church in Aleppo, Syria. It was founded in 1937, and its early membership was largely Armenian genocide survivors from the Marash Armenian Evangelical community.

In 2021 it was restored after being damaged in the Syrian civil war.
