= Nor Serount Cultural Association =

Nor Serount Cultural Association emblem

Nor Serount Cultural Association is an Armenian cultural organization with several branches throughout the world.

== History ==
First established in 1954 in Beirut, Lebanon, the association is a cultural branch of the Social Democrat Hunchakian Party. Its founding members were Manuel Atamian, Hrant Kankrouni, Sarkis Khayian, Kapriel Moloyan, Jirair Nayiri, Hagop Norashkharian (Norouni), and Bebo Simonian.

The organization aims to promote and preserve Armenian culture in the Armenian diaspora. Some of its activities include folk dancing, radio stations, book presentations, and art exhibitions.

== Locations ==
Considered one of the leading Armenian cultural associations in the Armenian Diaspora, the organization has numerous branches throughout the world including Aleppo, Damascus, Cairo, London, Sydney, Toronto, Montreal, Los Angeles, and others.

== See also ==
- Hamazkayin
