= Armenian Evangelical Union of North America =

The Armenian Evangelical Union of North America resulted from the merger of the Armenian Evangelical Union of Eastern States and Canada (founded in 1901) and the Armenian Evangelical Union of California (founded in 1908). The merger took place at a Constitutional Assembly held in Detroit, Michigan, in October 1971. It traces its history to the reform movement within the Armenian Apostolic Church resulting in the founding, on July 1, 1846, of the first Armenian Evangelical Church by 37 men and 3 women in Pera (near Constantinople), Turkey.
