= Armenian Evangelical Church =

Protestant church in Armenia

- Abbreviation: AEC
- Classification: Eastern Protestant
- Orientation: Evangelical
- Scripture: Bible
- Primate: Rene Levonian
- Language: Armenian
- Liturgy: Armenian Rite
- Territory: Armenia, Armenian diaspora
- Founder: 37 men and 3 women in Constantinople
- Independence: July 1, 1846, in Constantinople
- Separated from: Armenian Patriarchate of Constantinople
- Members: 250,000
- Official website: eca.am

The Armenian Evangelical Church (Armenian: Հայաստանեայց Աւետարանական Եկեղեցի, romanized: Hayastaneayts' Awyetaranakan Yekeghets'i) was established on July 1, 1846, by thirty-seven men and three women in Constantinople.

In March 1853 the Armenian Evangelical Church was separated from the Armenian Apostolic Church in the Ottoman Register of Taxation, as a separate community.

== Armenian Evangelical Unions ==
- Union of the Armenian Evangelical Churches in the Near East (UAECNE, 1924)
- Armenian Evangelical Union of North America (AEUNA, 1971)
- Armenian Evangelical Union of France (AEUF, 1924)
- Union of Evangelical Churches in Armenia (1995)
- Armenian Evangelical Union of Eurasia (1995)
- Armenian Evangelical Fellowship of Europe
- Union of Armenian Evangelical Unions in Bulgaria (1995)

== See also ==
- Religion in Armenia
