= Fairuz discography =

The discography of Lebanese singer Fairuz includes a large repertoire of more than 1,500 songs, out of which nearly 800 were released. Fairuz has sold more than 150 million records worldwide.

Around 85 Fairuz CDs, records, and cassettes have been officially released so far. Most songs featured on these albums were composed by the Rahbani brothers. Also featured are songs by Sayed Darwish, Ziad Rahbani, Zaki Nassif, Mohamed Abdel Wahab, Philemon Wehbe, Najib Hankash, and Mohamed Mohsen.

Fairuz's unreleased works are abundant. Most of them date back to the late 1940s, 1950s, and early 1960s and were composed by the Rahbani Brothers (certain unreleased songs, the oldest of all, are by Halim El Roumi). A Fairuz album composed by Egyptian musician Riad Al Sunbati was produced in the 1980s and is yet to be released. It is also thought that there are fifteen unreleased songs composed by Philemon Wehbe.

== Studio albums ==
Year	Original title	Translation	Producer	Composer(s)	Label	Popular tracks
1957	Rajioun	Returning	Assi & Mansour Rahbani	Assi & Mansour Rahbani	LRC	"Rajioun"
1957	Sahra Maa Fairuz	All-nighter with Fairuz	Assi & Mansour Rahbani	Assi & Mansour Rahbani	Voix de l'Orient	"Azzaaroura"
1959	Bakat Alhan Li Fairuz	A Bouquet from Fairuz	Assi & Mansour Rahbani	Assi & Mansour Rahbani	Voix de l'Orient	"Alyadi Lyadi"
1966	Andalousiyat	Poems	Assi & Mansour Rahbani	Assi & Mansour Rahbani; Sayed Darwish; Al Akhtal Al Saghir; Rafic Khouri	Voix de l'Orient	"Ya Shadi Al Alhan"
1967	Jerusalem in My Heart		Assi & Mansour Rahbani	Assi & Mansour Rahbani; Said Akl	Voix de l'Orient	"Zahrat Al Mada'in"
1967	Good Friday Eastern Sacred Songs		Assi & Mansour Rahbani	Assi & Mansour Rahbani	Voix de l'Orient	"Ana Al Oum Al Hazina"
1977	Christmas Hymns		Assi & Mansour Rahbani	Assi & Mansour Rahbani	Voix de l'Orient	"Laylet Eid"
1979	Wahdon	On Their Own	Ziad Rahbani	Assi & Mansour Rahbani; Ziad Rahbani; Talal Haydar	Zida	"Al Bosta" "Habbaytak Ta Nsit Al Nom" "Wahdon"
1980	Dahab Ayloul	Sings Philémon Wehbé	Philémon Wehbé	Philémon Wehbé; Joseph Harb	Voix de l'Orient	"Talaali Al Beki"
1987	Maarefti Feek	What I Know About You	Ziad Rahbani	Assi & Mansour Rahbani; Ziad Rahbani; Joaquín Rodrigo; Joseph Harb	Relax-In	"Le Beirut" "Oudak Rannan" "Maarefti Feek" "Khalleek Bil Beit"
1987	Shat Iskandaria	Alexandria Waterfront	Ziad Rahbani	Assi & Mansour Rahbani; Ziad Rahbani; Said Akl; Al Akhtal Al Saghir	Relax-In	"Shat Iskandaria" "Ams Intahayna"
1989	Bi Layl Wa Shiti	At Night When It's Raining	Philémon Wehbé	Philémon Wehbé	Voix de l'Orient	"Bi Layl Wa Shiti"
1991	Kifak Inta	How Are You	Ziad Rahbani	Ziad Rahbani; Joseph Harb	Relax-In	"Kifak Inta" "Oghniyat Al Wadaa" "Mesh Ossa Hay"
1994	Sings Zaki Nassif		Zaki Nassif	Zaki Nassif; Khalil Gibran	Voix de l'Orient	"Ahwak"
1995	Houmoum Al Hob	Problems of Love	Ziad Rahbani	Assi & Mansour Rahbani; Said Akl	Relax-In	"Houmoum Al Hob"
1995	Ila Assi	(Dedicated) to Assi	Ziad Rahbani	Assi & Mansour Rahbani	Voix de l'Orient	"Nehna Wil Amar Jiran"
1996	Meshwar	Ride	Ziad Rahbani	Assi & Mansour Rahbani	Voix de l'Orient	"Meshwar"
1999	Mesh Kayen Hayek Tkoun	It Wasn't Supposed to Be Like This	Ziad Rahbani	Ziad Rahbani; Mohamed Mohsen; Qays Bin Al Malouh	Relax-In	"Mesh Kayen Hayek Tkoun"
2002	Wala Kif	Autumn Leaves	Ziad Rahbani	Ziad Rahbani; Jacques Prévert & Joseph Kosma; Jerry Leiber & Mike Stoller	Relax-In	"Wala Kif"
2010	Eh Fi Amal	Yes There's Hope	Ziad Rahbani	Assi & Mansour Rahbani; Ziad Rahbani	Fayrouz Productions	"Eh Fi Amal"
2017	Bebalee	On My Mind	Rima Rahbani	John Lennon; Gilbert Bécaud & Maurice Vidalin; Mireille Brocé & Louis Gasté	Decca	"Rah Nirjaa Nitla'a"

== Musicals, soundtracks, and live albums ==
Year	Original Title	Translation	Producer	Composer(s)	Label	Main Tracks
1959	Folk Songs from Baalbeck		Assi & Mansour Rahbani	Assi & Mansour Rahbani	Voix de l'Orient	"Al Raiya Wal Amar"
1960	Damascus Festival		Assi & Mansour Rahbani	Assi & Mansour Rahbani	Voix de l'Orient	"Shaty Ya Deny"
1960	Ain Al Roumane – Musical		Assi & Mansour Rahbani	Assi & Mansour Rahbani	Voix de l'Orient	"Betshuf Bukra Betshuf"
1960	Baalbeck Festival		Assi & Mansour Rahbani	Assi & Mansour Rahbani	Voix de l'Orient	"Raho" "Khedni"
1961	Damascus Festival		Assi & Mansour Rahbani	Assi & Mansour Rahbani; Philémon Wehbé; Al Akhtal Al Saghir	Voix de l'Orient	"Ya Ruba"
1962	Jisr Al Kamar – Musical	The Bridge of the Moon	Assi & Mansour Rahbani	Assi & Mansour Rahbani; Philémon Wehbé	Voix de l'Orient	"Houdouni"
1963	Awdat Al Askar – Musical	Return of the Soldiers	Assi & Mansour Rahbani	Assi & Mansour Rahbani	Voix de l'Orient	"Btetloj Al Deny" "Lubnan Al Akhdar"
1964	Al Iswara – Musical	The Bracelet	Assi & Mansour Rahbani	Assi & Mansour Rahbani; Philémon Wehbé	Voix de l'Orient	"Baytik Ya Setti Al Khetyara"
1964	Al Leil Wal Endeel – Musical	The Night and the Lantern	Assi & Mansour Rahbani	Assi & Mansour Rahbani	Voix de l'Orient	"Wa Dawi Hal Endeel"
1964	Bayaa Al Khawatem – Musical	Rings for Sale	Assi & Mansour Rahbani	Assi & Mansour Rahbani; Philémon Wehbé	Voix de l'Orient	"Ya Hajal Sannine" "Emmy Namit A Bakkir"
1965	Bayaa Al Khawatem – Soundtrack to Youssef Chahine's motion picture	Rings for Sale	Assi & Mansour Rahbani	Assi & Mansour Rahbani; Philémon Wehbé	Voix de l'Orient	"Ya Hajal Sannine" "Emmy Namit A Bakkir"
1966	Damascus Festival		Assi & Mansour Rahbani	Assi & Mansour Rahbani	Voix de l'Orient	"Nehna Wil Amar Jiran"
1967	Safarberlik – Soundtrack to Henry Barakat's motion picture		Assi & Mansour Rahbani	Assi & Mansour Rahbani	Voix de l'Orient	"Ya Tayr"
1967	Hala Wal Malik – Musical	Hala and the King	Assi & Mansour Rahbani	Assi & Mansour Rahbani	Voix de l'Orient	"Daraj Al Loz"
1967	Ayam Fakhreddine – Musical	The Days of Fakhreddine	Assi & Mansour Rahbani	Assi & Mansour Rahbani	Voix de l'Orient	"Khattit Qadamkum"
1970	Ya'eesh Ya'eesh – Musical	Long Live Long Live	Assi & Mansour Rahbani	Assi & Mansour Rahbani	Voix de l'Orient	"Habbaytak Bissayf" "Shady"
1970	Ash'shakhs – Musical	The Person	Assi & Mansour Rahbani	Assi & Mansour Rahbani	Voix de l'Orient	"Sawa Rbeena"
1970	Bint El Haress – Soundtrack to Henry Barakat's motion picture	The Watchman's Daughter	Assi & Mansour Rahbani	Assi & Mansour Rahbani	Voix de l'Orient	"Nassam Alayna Al Hawa" "Tik Tik Tik"
1971	Sah Annom – Musical	Good Morning	Assi & Mansour Rahbani	Assi & Mansour Rahbani	Voix de l'Orient	"Shamou Hatha Assayf"
1971	Live in America		Assi & Mansour Rahbani	Assi & Mansour Rahbani	Voix de l'Orient	
1971	Natourat Al Mafateeh – Musical	The Key Keeper	Assi & Mansour Rahbani	Assi & Mansour Rahbani; Elias Rahbani	Voix de l'Orient	"Ya Najmat Al Leil"
1971	Jibal Al Sawan – Musical	The Mountains of Sawan	Assi & Mansour Rahbani	Assi & Mansour Rahbani	Voix de l'Orient	"Saedni"
1971	Sahrat Hob – Musical	Oriental Evening	Assi & Mansour Rahbani	Assi & Mansour Rahbani; Michel Trad	Voix de l'Orient	"Tebka Baladna"
1972	Al Mahatta – Musical	The Gas Station	Assi & Mansour Rahbani	Assi & Mansour Rahbani; Elias Rahbani; Ziad Rahbani	Voix de l'Orient	"Sa'alouni Annass"
1972	Live at the Piccadilly (Beirut)		Assi & Mansour Rahbani	Assi & Mansour Rahbani; Elias Rahbani; Ziad Rahbani	Voix de l'Orient	
1972	Nass Men Warak – Musical	People Made of Paper	Assi & Mansour Rahbani	Assi & Mansour Rahbani; Elias Rahbani; Wolfgang Amadeus Mozart	Voix de l'Orient	"Ya Ana Ya Ana"
1972	Al Baalbakiya – Musical	The Girl from Baalbeck	Assi & Mansour Rahbani	Assi & Mansour Rahbani	Voix de l'Orient	"Karam Al Alaly"
1973	Kasseedat Hob – Musical	Love Poem	Assi & Mansour Rahbani	Assi & Mansour Rahbani; Elias Rahbani; Wadih El Safi	Voix de l'Orient	"Ya Albi La Tetaab Albak"
1974	Loulou – Musical		Assi & Mansour Rahbani	Assi & Mansour Rahbani; Elias Rahbani	Voix de l'Orient	"Fi Ahwe Aal Mafra" "Allah Maak Ya Hawana" "Natarouna Ktir"
1975	Mays El Rim – Musical		Assi & Mansour Rahbani	Assi & Mansour Rahbani; Elias Rahbani; Ziad Rahbani	Voix de l'Orient	"Akher Iyam Al Sayfiye"
1976	Damascus Festival		Assi & Mansour Rahbani	Assi & Mansour Rahbani	Voix de l'Orient	"Ya Tayr Al Warwar"
1976	Bhebbak Ya Loubnan (Live in Lebanon)	I Love You Lebanon	Assi & Mansour Rahbani	Assi & Mansour Rahbani; Philémon Wehbé; Rafic Khouri	Voix de l'Orient	"Bhebbak Ya Loubnan"
1978	Petra – Musical		Assi & Mansour Rahbani	Assi & Mansour Rahbani; Elias Rahbani; Ziad Rahbani	Voix de l'Orient	"Bi Oulo Zghayar Baladi"
1979	Live at the Olympia		Assi & Mansour Rahbani	Assi & Mansour Rahbani; Sayed Darwish	Voix de l'Orient	
1979	Lebanon Forever (Live in Beirut)		Assi & Mansour Rahbani	Assi & Mansour Rahbani; Said Akl	Voix de l'Orient	"Hkeely Hkeely Aan Balady"
1982	Hawa Beirut	Live in the US & Canada	Assi & Mansour Rahbani	Assi & Mansour Rahbani; Said Akl	Tigris	
1986	Ala Masrah Al Andalus (Cairo)	Live in Cairo	Assi & Mansour Rahbani	Assi & Mansour Rahbani; Said Akl	Voix de l'Orient	
1988	Live at the Royal Festival Hall (London)		Ziad Rahbani	Assi & Mansour Rahbani; Ziad Rahbani; Sayed Darwish	Voix de l'Orient	"Addesh Kan Fi Nass"
2000	Live at Beiteddine		Ziad Rahbani	Assi & Mansour Rahbani; Ziad Rahbani; Sayed Darwish; Mohamed Younes Alqadi	EMI	

== Notable compilation albums ==
Year	Album	Composer(s)	Label
1966	Reminiscing with Fairuz	Assi & Mansour Rahbani; Sayed Darwish	Voix de l'Orient
1966	Fairuz in a Sentimental Mood	Assi & Mansour Rahbani; Said Akl	Voix de l'Orient
1969	Some of Fairuz's Favorites	Assi & Mansour Rahbani	Philips
1972	Greatest Hits	Assi & Mansour Rahbani	Voix de l'Orient
1972	10 Years of Success	Assi & Mansour Rahbani	Voix de l'Orient
1977	The Very Best of, Volume 1	Assi & Mansour Rahbani; Khalil Gibran; Wolfgang Amadeus Mozart; Najib Henkesh	Voix de l'Orient
1988	The Very Best of, Volume 2	Assi & Mansour Rahbani	Voix de l'Orient
1993	Immortal Songs	Assi & Mansour Rahbani; Sayed Darwish	Voix de l'Orient
1996	Qasaed (Poems)	Assi & Mansour Rahbani; Mohamed Abdel Wahab; Said Akl; Al Akhtal Al Saghir	Voix de l'Orient
2000	Modern Favorites	Assi & Mansour Rahbani; Ziad Rahbani; Mohamed Mohsen; Talal Haydar	Virgin
2001	Fairuz Sings Ziad Rahbani	Ziad Rahbani	EMI
2006	Chillout Classics by Ziad Rahbani	Ziad Rahbani; Joseph Harb; Talal Haydar	EMI
2006	Legend: The Best of	Assi & Mansour Rahbani; Ziad Rahbani	EMI

== Notable singles ==
Year	Title	Album	Composer(s)	Label
1952	"Itab"		Assi & Mansour Rahbani	Zodephone
1957	"Nehna Wil Amar Jiran"		Assi & Mansour Rahbani	Voix de l'Orient
1957	"Zourouni"		Sayed Darwish	LRC
1964	"Bektob Ismak Ya Habibi"		Assi & Mansour Rahbani	Voix de l'Orient
1965	"Ya Mersal El Marasil"	Rings for Sale	Assi & Mansour Rahbani	Voix de l'Orient
1965	"Ya Hajal Sannine"	Rings for Sale	Assi & Mansour Rahbani	Voix de l'Orient
1965	"Aatini Nay"		Khalil Gibran; Najib Hankash	Voix de l'Orient
1965	"Btetloj El Deneh"		Assi & Mansour Rahbani	Voix de l'Orient
1966	"Bekarm El Loulou"		Assi & Mansour Rahbani	Voix de l'Orient
1966	"Al Kuds Al Ati'a"	Jerusalem in My Heart	Assi & Mansour Rahbani	Voix de l'Orient
1967	"Zahrat Al Mada'in"	Jerusalem in My Heart	Assi & Mansour Rahbani	Voix de l'Orient
1969	"Shayif Al Bahr Shu Kbir"		Assi & Mansour Rahbani	Voix de l'Orient
1970	"Habbaytak Bissayf"	Ya'eesh Ya'eesh	Assi & Mansour Rahbani	Voix de l'Orient
1970	"Ana La Habibi"		Assi & Mansour Rahbani	Voix de l'Orient
1972	"Ya Ana Ya Ana"	Nass Men Warak	Assi & Mansour Rahbani; Wolfgang Amadeus Mozart	Voix de l'Orient
1973	"Sa'alouni Annass"	Al Mahatta	Mansour Rahbani; Ziad Rahbani	Voix de l'Orient
1973	"Kan Ezzaman (aka Hanna Al Sakran)"		Elias Rahbani	Voix de l'Orient
1976	"Bhebbak Ya Loubnan"	Bhebbak Ya Loubnan	Assi & Mansour Rahbani	Voix de l'Orient
