= Hoda Haddad =

Lebanese singer and actress (born 1944)

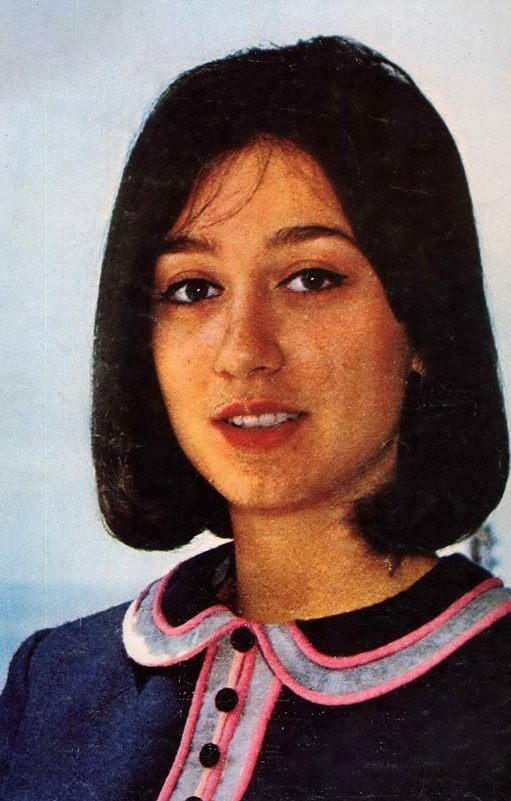
- Haddad in 1965
- Born: Hoda Wadie Haddad; 15 August 1944 (age 82); Beirut, Lebanon
- Notable work: Actress; singer
- Style: Lebanese
- Relatives: Fairuz (sister); Assi Rahbani (brother-in-law); Ziad Rahbani (nephew)

Hoda Wadie Haddad (Arabic: هدى وديع حداد; born 15 August 1944) is a Lebanese singer and actress. She is known for her songs and work with the Rahbani brothers, Nasri Shamseddine, Joseph Nassif, Elie Choueiri and her older sister Fairuz (Nouhad Haddad).

== Early and personal life ==
Haddad was born shortly after the Lebanese independence in August 1944 to a modest family in the capital city, Beirut. Her parents were Wadie Haddad, a print worker, and Lisa Boustany, a housewife. She had two sisters, Nouhad (known by her artistic name Fairuz) and Amal; and a brother, Joseph.

Haddad hails from the Chouf district, as her husband Chawki Ziade. She has two children: Dina and Joseph.

== Career ==
Haddad joined her sister in most of her artistic work, even though she only occasionally performs short roles. This did not prevent her from achieving her own fame, derived from accompanying Rahbani songs and from participating in successful films and plays. Her first successful series was called Min Yawm la Yawm (From Day to Day), alongside actors Wahid Jalal and Antoine Kerbage, with the first part in 1972, and the second part in 1979. In 1987, she would play a teacher in the series Ayyam al-Dirasa, produced by Ghady and Marwan Rahbani.

Haddad sang with her sister Fairuz in multiple plays, such as Mays Al-Reem (1975), Loulou (1974), and Petra (1978). These would be followed by plays in the late 80s and 90s by Mansour Rahbani: Sayf 840 in 1988, Al Wassiya in 1993, and Akher Ayyam Sikrat in 1997.

Haddad was also a television presenter, most famously on the show Sa'a Ghaniyye alongside Lebanese presenter Riad Sharara in 1979, in which she sang multiple songs including Tarakna Wardi, Ellak Wahdak, and Badna 3arouss. In 1997, she hosted the program Mahattat produced by Mansour Rahbani, and included guests such as Carole Samaha, Ghassan Rahbani, and Elias Rahbani.

In 2002, Haddad joined the Caracalla Dance Theatre as an actress and singer, and continues to perform with the company to this day. Produced by Abdel Halim Caracalla, Haddad's most notable roles within the company include a 2002 interpretation of One Thousand and One Nights, 2009's Villagers' Opera, and 2008's Zayed and the Dream.

Haddad's soft and expressive voice was praised by a number of people. She participated in the Rahbani Art School starting with the play Dawalib Al-Hawa in 1962, in which she portrayed an innocent rural girl. She sang a number of songs in plays and television sketches, including "Darj Al-Yasmeen", "Ya Tala'il", "Darj Al-Yasmeen", "Lido Alu Talaa", "Al-Yasmeen Al-Yasmeen Lo'h". She also performed another song in the play Qissat Hob, which was called "My Name Is My Love". Haddad has also had prose conversations in all plays, from the play The Ring Vendor to the play Petra in 1977, either a second or a third character. She also performed songs outside of theatre, such as "Rizqallah Ala Al-Arabiyat" and "Ala Al-Chaara Talaqna". She acted in several TV series and released songs through at least the 1990s; these include: "Ya Hallel", "Ya Bayya"," Let Us Hear No One", "Lina and Lina", and "Ala Shar". She also performed concerts alongside Fairuz worldwide.

== Filmography ==
=== Television ===
- Schools Days (الدراسة)
- From Day to Day Part One (من يوم ليوم الجزء الأول)
- Saat w Ghaniya (ساعة وغنية)
- Dafater Al Dafater (دفاتر الليل)

=== Cinema ===
- The Ring Vendor (بياع الخواتم)
- Safar Barlik (سفر برلك)
- The Lost Wife (الزوجة المفقودة)

== Plays ==
- Wheels of Fancy (دواليب الهوى) – 1962
- Love Story (قصة حب)
- Mays Alreem (ميس الريم)
- Station (المحطة)
- Lulu (لولو)
- Petra (بترا) – 1977
- The Last Days of Socrates (آخر أيام سقراط)
- The Key Keeper (ناطورة المفاتيح)
- Sayf 840 (صيف ٨٤٠)
