= Zaki Nassif =

Zaki Nassif زكي ناصيف
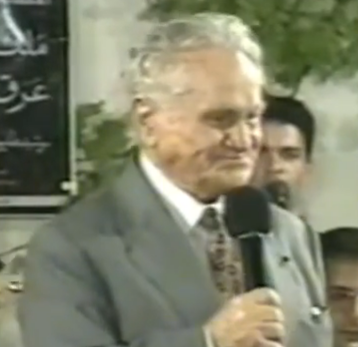

Background information
- Born: Machghara, Lebanon
- Died: 10 March 2004 (aged 85) Beirut, Lebanon
- Genres: Lebanese music
- Occupations: Singer, composer
- Years active: 1926–2000

Zaki Nassif (Arabic: زكي ناصيف) was a Lebanese music composer and singer. He was influential among the first generation of composers for the mass audience for music on radio in Lebanon in the 1940s and 1950s, and continued to be a force in Lebanese music until his death in 2004.

== Biography ==
Born in Machghara, the largest town in the western Beqaa Valley, Zaki Nassif was involved in music and country folk poetry (zagal, maannaa, 'ataba, mijana, abu el zuluf, etc.) at an early age. He was one of the Big Five who contributed material to Radio Orient and Radio Liban in the 1950s (alongside Halim El Roumi and Philemon Wehbe among others).

== Music ==
The lyrics of his songs are very often of the patriotic kind (Baladi Habibi, Ya Daya'ati- my village, etc.). When his recordings are played on Lebanese TV stations, it is always along with scenery from Lebanon. Zaki Nassif is remembered for his anthem song "Rajeh Yittammar" (Lebanon will be rebuilt) during the civil war, at a time when violence and destruction were the rule rather than the exception in Lebanon. The song is upbeat and inspires patriotism and is recommended as a staple Zaki Nassif's material.

In 1995, Zaki Nassif composed a full album for Fairuz (Fairuz Chante Zaki Nassif, Voix de l'Orient label). The CD contains material that shows the variety of expression Zaki Nassif had.

== Albums ==
There are at least four CDs of re-issued recordings on the Voix de l'Orient label. Zaki Nassif's CDs have over 20 songs or 70 minutes.

== Death ==
Zaki Nassif died in Beirut on 10 March 2004 from a heart attack.

== See also ==
- Rahbani brothers
- Assi Rahbani
- Mansour Rahbani
- Fairuz
- Wadih El Safi
- List of Lebanese people
