= Zahrat al-Mada'en =

- Cover of the 1967 vinyl release

Song by Fairuz

from the album Al Qudsu Fil Bal (Note: Arabic for "Jerusalem on My Mind". The album itself translates it as "Jerusalem in My Heart".)
- Language: Arabic
- Released: 1967
- Length: 8:34
- Label: Voix de l'Orient
- Composers: Assi Rahbani; Mansour Rahbani
- Lyricist: Said Akl

Music video
- "Zahrat al-Mada'en" on YouTube

"Zahrat al-Mada'en" (Arabic: زهرة المدائن, transl. "The Flower of Cities"), also marketed under its French title "La Fleur des cités", is a 1967 Arabic song performed by Lebanese singer Fairuz, composed by the Rahbani brothers and written by Said Akl.

The song was composed as a somber musical response to the Naksa, (Note: Arabic for "setback", the Arabic name for the humanitarian disaster of the 1967 Six Day War.) and its lyrics focus on the city of Jerusalem and the experiences of its inhabitants. The song also expresses a hope for the city's future liberation and emphasizes Jerusalem's religiously diverse and multi-confessional history.

The song, one of the first Arabic-language songs to deal with Jerusalem in any detail, was well-received, becoming an instant hit, the most popular of Fairuz's songs about Palestine, and one of the most celebrated songs of the Arab world.

== Background ==
The Rahbani brothers were known for their early commitment to the Palestinian cause, and Fairuz is celebrated throughout the Arab world for her songs about Palestine, the first of which was the 1957 semi-dramatic "Raji'un" ("We Are Returning"), written and composed for Cairo Radio. The Rahbanis' songs for Palestine built on a strong tradition of pre-existing Arab nationalist and pro-Palestinian songs pioneered in Egypt by singers Umm Kulthum and Mohammed Abdel Wahab, which endorsed Gamal Abdel Nasser and frequently featured religious references.

The Arab defeat in the 1967 Six-Day War, however, came as an impactful shock to the Arab world, with the Arab populace being previously led to believe that victory is inevitable, even as Arab armies were suffering defeat after defeat. For the Arab world, the war's disastrous outcome came with several political and cultural ramifications, that Christopher Stone (Note: Associate Professor of Arabic in Hunter College and author of Popular Culture and Nationalism in Lebanon: Fairouz and the Rahbani Nation.) likened to the impact of World War I on Europe. Although it had the short-term effect of temporarily decreasing artistic activity, the defeat ended up causing a cultural renaissance of sorts with disappointment, grief and resolve being expressed in several artistic mediums. One of the quickest artistic responses to the defeat was "Zahrat al-Mada'en", which was debuted in Lebanon's Cedars Festival in the very summer of 1967. The song's lyrics were written by poet Said Akl who also wrote Fairuz's songs about Damascus, Mecca and Kuwait, among others.

== Composition ==
Eight minutes in length, "Zahrat al-Mada'en" is considered a quintessentially Rahbani song, opening with violins which had become a key ingredient of their songs by the 1960s, and otherwise dominated by strings and martial-sounding brass, a combination which became a trademark of the Rahbanis' nationalistic songs for Palestine.

Melodically, the song alternates between martial music and Byzantine Arab church hymns, with an overarching theme of sobriety and sentimentality juxtaposed with a tone of defiant resistance, all of which are observable in the song's 90-second anthem-like intro. As in the first Rahbani song about Palestine, "Raji'un", Fairuz is accompanied throughout the song by a chorus of male and female voices.

=== Lyrical content ===
The song was written in Classical Arabic, (Note: As were most of the Rahbani songs written by poet Said Akl.) its title employing for the sake of poetic expediency the relatively rare plural for 'city', madāʾin, which lends an abstraction to Jerusalem's description reinforced throughout the song.

The formality of the song's language is interpreted by Stone as conveying a sense of timelessness augmented by mentions of Jesus, Mary, as well as the city's places of worship. The city is addressed in the second-person with a sense of longing, as if being remembered from a distance, while the predicament of its populace, especially the children made homeless, is dwelt on.

After a melodious melancholy that accompanies lyrics about the weeping of Jesus and Mary, the song's volume, tempo and the resolve of its chorus increases, promising a "blinding rage" mounted on "awesome steeds", which Stone interprets as an allusion to Saladin's recapture of Jerusalem from the crusaders in 1187. The song ends with prayers for the effacement of the distance between the narrator and Jerusalem through liberation of the city, held to be only be possible through the active resistance of its populace.

Uniquely, the song's lyrics mention the houses of worship of all three Abrahamic faiths, stressing the city of Jerusalem's historical and religious diversity, which Joseph Massad contrasts with Israeli song "Jerusalem of Gold", interpreted instead an expression of solely exclusivist Jewish narratives and Zionist ideology.

== Legacy ==
A year after the song's release, Fairuz was awarded a key to Jerusalem from the Jerusalem Cultural Committee. This song along with Fairuz's other pro-Palestinian work cemented her status as a champion for the Palestinian cause, with poet Mahmoud Darwish stating that Fairuz and the Rahbani brothers have artistically done more for Palestine than anyone else.

== See also ==
- Mahmoud Darwish
- Jerusalem of Gold
- History of Jerusalem
- Religious significance of Jerusalem

== Sources ==
- Boum, A. (2016), ""Soundtracks of Jerusalem"", Soundtracks of Jerusalem: YouTube, North African Rappers, and the Fantasies of Resistance, Brill, pp. 284–310, ISBN 978-900432290-5, JSTOR 10.1163/j.ctt1w8h27r.15.
- Cannon, Mae Elise (2013), Just Spirituality: How Faith Practices Fuel Social Action, InterVarsity Press, ISBN 978-083083775-5.
- Maasri, Zeina (2020), Cosmopolitan Radicalism: The Visual Politics of Beirut's Global Sixties, Cambridge University Press, ISBN 978-110848771-9.
- Massad, Joseph (2005), Liberating Songs: Palestine Put to Music", from "Modernity, Minority, and the Public Sphere: Jews and Christians in the Middle East, Duke University Press, ISBN 082238687-9.
- Stone, Christopher (2007), Popular Culture and Nationalism in Lebanon, Taylor & Francis, ISBN 978-113598015-3.
- Stone, Christopher (2008), Fayruz, the Rahbani Brothers, Jerusalem, and the Leba-stinian song, Taylor & Francis, ISBN 978-113410287-7.
