= Eh Fi Amal =

Studio album by Fairuz
- Released: 2010
- Recorded: 2003–2010
- Genre: Arabic
- Length: 45:58
- Label: Fairuz Productions
- Producer: Ziad Rahbani

Fairuz chronology
Wala Keef (2001)	Eh Fi Amal (2010)

Eh Fi Amal (Arabic: إيه في أمل meaning "Yes There Is Hope") is the ninety-ninth album by the Lebanese recording artist Fairuz, released October 6, 2010 in Lebanon and the following day in the rest of the world.

The album follows the massive success of its first two singles : "قال قايل" "Kal Kayel" (Someone Said), "قصة صغيرة كتير" "Kissa Sghery Kteer" (Very Short Story) and "إيه في أمل" "Eh Fi Amal" (Yes, There Is Hope), which were sent to radio a month before the album's release. It also includes two previously unreleased songs.

The album was a massive critical and commercial success, marking yet another highlight in her career/collaboration with her composer son Ziad Rahbani. It is also a return to studio after years of live album releases. It was not released in Saudi Arabia because none of the local production companies agreed to publish it inside the country, thus the album never charted. However, despite the album not being available, fans downloaded the album heavily on the internet and through illegal methods to listen to her new songs.

== Track listing ==
All lyrics are written by Ziad Rahbani except where noted; all music is composed by Ziad Rahbani except where noted.

No.	Title	Lyrics	Music	Length
1.	""Al Ayel" "قال قايل""			4:42
2.	""Ossa Zghiri Ktir" "قصة صغيرة كتير""			4:37
3.	""Kel Mal Haki" "كل ما الحكي""			3:23
4.	""Kbiril Mazha Hay" "كبيرة المزحة هاي""			6:00
5.	""Allah Kbir" "الله كبير""			4:22
6.	""Al Ardou Lakoum" "الأرض لكم""	Khalil Gibran		2:09
7.	""Ma Chawart Hali" "ما شاورت حالي""			3:04
8.	""Diar Bakr" "ديار بكر""			3:24
9.	""El Bint El Chalabiya" "البنت الشلبية""	Traditional	Traditional	3:02
10.	""Eh Fi Amal" "إيه في أمل""			4:16
11.	""Bektob Asamihon" "بكتب أساميهن""	Assi Rahbani; Mansour Rahbani	Assi Rahbani; Mansour Rahbani	2:43
12.	""Tal El Zaatar" "تل الزعتر""			4:20
