= Ghassan Rahbani =

Lebanese musician (born 1964)

Ghassan Elias Rahbani (Arabic: غسان إلياس الرحباني; born 13 May 1964) is a Lebanese producer, lyricist, composer, arranger, orchestra conductor, pianist, and singer.

== Family ==
As one of the children of Elias Rahbani, he is a member of the prominent Rahbani family well known for their musical contributions to Lebanese music, including inspiring and nurturing singer Fairuz, married to Assi Rahbani of the Rahbani brothers. Rahbani married Dalida Shama'i in 2002.

Rahbani family
  - Assi (1923–1986) + Fairuz (born 1934/1935)
    - Ziad (1956–2025)
    - Hali (born 1958)
    - Rima (born 1965)
    - Layal (1960–1988)
  - Mansour (1925–2009) + Thereze
    - Marwan (born 1958)
    - Ghadi (born 1960)
    - Oussama (born 1965)
  - Elias (1938–2021) + Nina
    - Ghassan (born 1964)
    - Jad (born 1968)
    - Ilham

== Discography ==
=== Studio albums ===
Year	Original Title	Translation	Label	Main Tracks
1981	Ghassan Rahbani		Rahbania	Lonely Boy
1982	Non-Stop Hits Vol. 1 (with Pascale Sakr)		Rahbania	Smoke On The Water; Chiquitita; Jealous Guy
1982	Non-Stop Hits Vol. 2 (with Pascale Sakr)		Rahbania	Woman in Love; She's a Lady; I Will Survive
1985	One of a Kind		Cobra	I Desire
1994	Buzzi-War (with Oussama Rahbani)		Voice of Beirut	Ishteghil; Mamnou'; Vitamine
1996	Hannibal (with Ghassan Saliba)		EMI	Ya Jaychi Ya Amali
1999	Iza Zaajak Shilo	If It Hurts Take It Off	Disco 99	Iza Zaajak Shilo
2000	Senet El 2000	Year 2000	Voice of Beirut	Senet El 2000 Parts 1 & 2 Ya Maaly Al Wazir; Tareeq El Matar
2003	El Bayda Wel Te'shira	The Egg	[Self-Released]	El Bayda Wel Te'shira; Karn El Alfein
2004	Kama Al Ard Kathalik... Min Fawk	On Earth As... Above	Bataboff	

=== Main singles ===
Year	Original Title	Translation	Label	Album
1986	What Does It Take from You (Ghassan Rahbani Group)		[Self-Released]	
1990	Vitamine	Vitamin	Voice of Beirut	Buzzi-War
1991	Mamnou'	Forbidden	Voice of Beirut	Buzzi-War
1994	Ishteghil	Work	Voice of Beirut	Buzzi-War
1995	Tareeq El Matar	Airport Road	Voice of Beirut	Senet El 2000
1997	Ya Maaly Al Wazir	Mr. Minister	Voice of Beirut	Senet El 2000
2000	Senet El 2000 Part 2	Year 2000 Part 2	Voice of Beirut	Senet El 2000
2001	Hashish (Ghassan Rahbani Group)		[Self-Released]	
2002	El Jamhour Ayez Keda (Ghassan Rahbani Group)	That's What the People Want	[Self-Released]	
2002	Without Your Love		[Self-Released]	
2003	Bi Sharafkon	We're Begging You	[Self-Released]	
2003	Karn El Alfein	20th Century	[Self-Released]	El Bayda Wel Te'shira
2005	El Bayda Wel Te'shira	The Egg	[Self-Released]	El Bayda Wel Te'shira
2005	Kermel El 'Am Bi Mouto	For Those Who Are Dying	[Self-Released]	
2007	El Hurriyye Bi Eed El Khaweja	Freedom Is in His Hands	[Self-Released]	
2008	Nehna Hawn Men'ish	This Is Where We Live	[Self-Released]	
2009	Ebaad Menno Intekhib Doddo	Step Away From Him Vote Against Him	[Self-Released]	
2009	Come Back to Me		[Self-Released]	
2013	El Mashkal Bel Za'im (Ghassan Rahbani Group)	The Problem Is the Governor	[Self-Released]	
2013	Leave My Girl Alone (Ghassan Rahbani Group)		[Self-Released]	
2015	Ya Natrine	Those Who Are Waiting	[Self-Released]	
2017	My Religion		[Self-Released]	
2020	Maak Ma Maak	Do You Have Any Money or Not	[Self-Released]	
2020	Ersom Omri	Draw My Life	[Self-Released]	
2020	Lessa Faker	I Still Recall	[Self-Released]	
2021	Baad Ma Shefet Shi	You Still Haven't Seen Anything	[Self-Released]	
