= Bil Afrah =

Bilal Afrah

Studio album by Ziad Rahbani
- Released: 1977
- Recorded: 1975
- Studios: Studio Chalhoub, Beirut
- Genres: Arabic, world
- Length: 38:08
- Labels: Phillips, Lebanon
- Producer: Ziad Rahbani

Bilal Afrah (بالأفراح) is an instrumental album arranged and produced by Ziad Rahbani in 1977. The title can be translated as 'for joy/celebration' or 'for weddings'. It was recorded in 1975, in the early period of the Lebanese Civil War. The 19 year-old Rahbani assembled a group of Christian and Muslim musicians to record instrumental versions of some of Arabic music’s most popular love songs.

== Background ==
Rahbani was a son of the famed singer Fairuz, and the Civil War had forced him to move from the family’s Antelias home to West Beirut’s Hamra district, a cosmopolitan enclave known for its music scene. He had begun writing music for his mother and produced two successful plays before arranging the production of Bil Afrah. Although he is remembered as a fiercely political artist (he was a committed member of the Communist Party) Bilal Afrah itself is notable for not being overtly political. Instead, Rahbani assembled an ensemble of Muslims and Christian musicians and recorded instrumental versions of cherished Arabic melodies and love songs in what has been seen by many as an explicitly anti-sectarian statement.

== Track listing ==
1. "Kaskess Warak" قصقص ورق (the Rahbani Brothers)
2. "Raksat Tahiat" رقصة تحيات (the Rahbani Brothers)
3. "Atem Ya Lail" عتم يا ليل (the Rahbani Brothers)
4. "Akoud Habibi" آخد حبيبي (Zakaria Ahmad)
5. "Moukadimat Sahriye" مقدمة سهرية (Ziad Rahbani)
6. "Ya Hamam" يا حمام يا مروح (Halim El-Roumi)
7. "Sa'alouni El Nass" سألوني الناس (Ziad Rahbani)
8. "Ya Habibi Koullama" يا حبيبي كلما هب الهوى (the Rahbani Brothers)
9. "Chirak" شيراك (Armenian folksong)
10. "Zourouni" زوروني (El-Sayed Darwish)
