= Ziad Rahbani =

Lebanese composer (1956–2025)

Ziad Rahbani زياد الرحباني
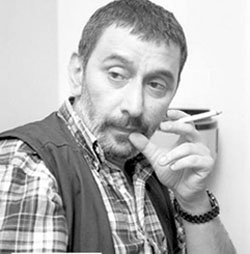
- Rahbani in 2001

Background information
- Born: 1 January 1956; Antelias, Lebanon
- Died: 26 July 2025 (aged 69) Beirut, Lebanon
- Genres: Arabic music; Lebanese music; opera; jazz
- Occupations: Composer; writer; musician; political columnist
- Instruments: Piano; electronic keyboards; accordion; buzuq; vocals
- Family
- Parents: Assi Rahbani (father); Fairuz (mother)
- Relatives: Mansour Rahbani (uncle); Elias Rahbani (uncle); Hoda Haddad (aunt); Others

Ziad Rahbani (Arabic: زياد الرحباني, romanized: Ziyād ar-Raḥbānī; 1 January 1956 – 26 July 2025) was a Lebanese composer, musician, playwright, and political commentator. He was the son of Lebanese singer Fairuz and Lebanese composer Assi Rahbani. Many of his musicals satirize Lebanese Sectarian politics both during and after the Lebanese Civil War, and are often critical of the traditional political establishment. He was considered one of the most influential artists in modern Lebanese history, remembered for his wit, creativity, and refusal to conform.

== Background ==
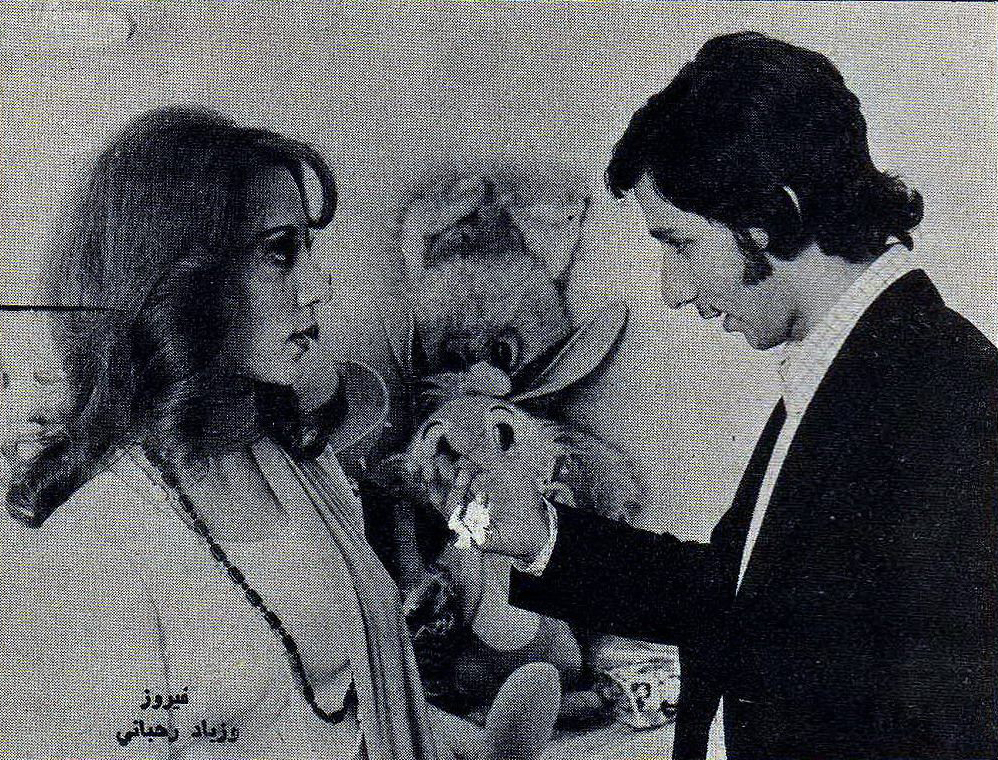
Rahbani with his mother in a photo from a 1973 magazine

Ziad Rahbani was the son of the Lebanese composer Assi Rahbani and Lebanese singer Fairuz.

Rahbani was married to Dalal Karam, with whom he had a boy named "Assi", but he was later found out not to be his biological son. Their relationship later ended in divorce, prompting Karam to write a series of articles for the gossip magazine Ashabaka about their marriage. Rahbani composed a number of songs about their relationship, including "Marba el Dalal" and "Bisaraha".

Rahbani had a long-standing relationship with Lebanese leftist movements, and was a self-declared communist, being a lifelong affiliate with the Lebanese Communist Party. Furthermore, in an interview with the journalist Ghassan Bin-Jiddu, Rahbani stated that the bloodbath massacres in the Palestinian camp Tall a-Za’tar by extreme-rightist Christian militias in 1976 was the main reason that drove him to leave to West Beirut. Notwithstanding, he also expressed his support to the Lebanese resistance and its project in the face of "the Israeli occupation and its Zionist Apartheid regime". Coming from a Christian family, his politics and viewpoints were very radical when compared to his right-wing teenage surroundings. Rahbani was popularly understood to be an atheist.

=== Family tree ===
Rahbani family
  - Assi (1923–1986) + Fairuz (born 1934 or 1935)
    - Ziad (1956–2025)
    - Hali (1958–2026)
    - Layal (1960–1988)
    - Rima (born 1965)
  - Mansour (1925–2009) + Thereze
    - Marwan (born 1958)
    - Ghadi (born 1960)
    - Oussama (born 1965)
  - Elias (1938–2021) + Nina
    - Ghassan (born 1964)
    - Jad (born 1968)
    - Ilham

== Career ==
Rahbani's first artistic work was "Sadiqi Allah" (My Friend God), a collection of writings between the years 1967 and 1968 when he was in his teens which was released without his knowledge by his father Assi Rahbani. In 1973, at age 17, Rahbani composed his first music for Fairuz, his mother. Assi Rahbani, his father, was hospitalized, and his mother Fairuz was to play the leading role in Al Mahatta by the Rahbani brothers. Mansour Rahbani, his uncle, who had written the lyrics of a song about Assi Rahbani's forced absence, gave Ziad Rahbani the task of composing its music. The song "Saalouni El Nass" (People Asked Me) gained Rahbani recognition in the music world.

In 1974, Rahbani met Issam Hajali, and together they collaborated on several songs for the band Firkat al-Ard, including the album Oghneya.

Rahbani appeared for the first time on stage in Al Mahatta where he played the role of the detective. He also appeared later on in the Rahbani Brothers' Mays el Rim in the role of one of the policemen. Rahbani's first step into theatre was with the Bkennaya Theater in Sahriyyeh. He followed that with highly politicized string of plays. "In 'The Harvest of Thorns: Political Comedy Theater in Syria and Lebanon,' Aksam Al-Youssef wrote, "Under these circumstances, as a young adult, Ziad imposed himself on the artistic scene as a playwright, director, composer, pianist, and actor. In a short time, his original theatre would become the center of attention for young people who found in it the voice of a lost generation caught in the throws of war and violence.

As an actor, besides appearing in his own plays, Rahbani starred in Randa Chahal Sabbagh's 2003 film The Kite.

=== Collaborations ===
Before, during, and after the Lebanese Civil War, Rahbani released and co-released several albums, television programs, radio programs, and a children's book consisting of: Bi hal shakel, Abou Ali, Halleluja, Shareet Ghayr Houdoudi, Baadna Taybeen Ullo Allah, Houdou Nesbi, Ana Mouch Kafer, Hakaya al Atfal, Bema Enno, Monodose (with singer Salma Mosfi). and Maaloumat Mush Akidi (with singer Latifa).

== Politics ==
Ziad Rahbani was associated with the Lebanese left and identified as a communist. His relationship with the Lebanese Communist Party is described by scholars as a long-standing but informal affiliation. His artistic and political development took place amid the student movements, labor unrest, and the Palestinian political mobilization of early-1970s Lebanon, during a period of ideological transformation across the Arab left following the Six Day War in 1967. Although raised in an affluent artistic household, Rahbani sought to represent working-class experiences through colloquial Lebanese Arabic, satire, and musical arrangements combining Arab popular music with jazz and funk. His work frequently addressed class inequality, corruption, sectarianism, and the contradictions of everyday Lebanese social life.

== Death ==
Rahbani died at a hospital at approximately 9:00 am (UTC 6:00 am) on 26 July 2025, at the age of 69, reportedly of a heart attack. He had been a chain-smoker for most of his life. Culture Minister Ghassan Salamé said Rahbani needed a liver transplant but refused to undergo surgery.

On 6 August 2025, the Lebanese Cabinet approved renaming Hafez al-Assad Avenue—which links Beirut to the Beirut–Rafic Hariri International Airport—to Ziad Rahbani Avenue to honour Rahbani.

== Discography ==
=== Studio releases ===
Year	Original Title	Translation	Producer	Songwriter(s)	Vocalists	Label	Main Tracks
1973	A Rahbani Festival		Ziad Rahbani	Assi & Mansour Rahbani; Sayed Darwish		Voix de l'Orient	Allamouni
1977	Kyrie Eleison		Ziad Rahbani	Ziad Rahbani	Magida El Roumi; Samy Clarke; Lady Madonna; Joseph Sakr; Youhanna Al Habib Sader	Voix de l'Orient	Nahnou Sahiroun; Sayidi
1977	Bil Afrah	Wedding Music	Ziad Rahbani	Assi & Mansour Rahbani; Ziad Rahbani; Sayed Darwish; Halim El Roumi; Mohamed Sultan		Philips	Zourouni
1979	Abu Ali / Prelude (Maxi Single)		Ziad Rahbani	Ziad Rahbani		Zida	Prelude From Mays El Rim; Abu Ali
1979	Belly Dance Fever		Ziad Rahbani; Elias Rahbani	Assi & Mansour Rahbani; Ziad Rahbani; Elias Rahbani; Sayed Darwish		Voix de l'Orient	El Hilwa Di
1985	Houdou' Nisbi	Relative Calm	Ziad Rahbani	Ziad Rahbani; Joe Sample	Ziad Rahbani; Sami Haouat; Monica Asali	Voix de l'Orient	Bala Wala Shi; Rouh Khabbir; Khalas
1987	Hekaya	Story	Ziad Rahbani	Ziad Rahbani; Najat Naimeh; Abido Basha	Salma Mosfi; Carmen Lebbos	---	Ossat Al Koz
1987	Shrit Gher Hdoudy	Borderless Tape	Ziad Rahbani	Ziad Rahbani	Ziad Rahbani; Sami Haouat	Aprodisco	Bi Saraha
1995	Bema Enno...	Considering That...	Ziad Rahbani	Ziad Rahbani	Ziad Rahbani; Joseph Sakr; Salma Mosfi	Voix de l'Orient	Bema Enno... Talfan Ayash
2001	Monodose		Ziad Rahbani	Ziad Rahbani; Antonio Carlos Jobim; Astrud Gilberto	Ziad Rahbani; Salma Mosfi	EMI	Un verre chez nous Wallaat Ktir; Assaada Allahou Masa'akom

=== Albums for Fairuz ===
Year	Original Title	Translation	Songwriter(s)	Label
1972	Sa'alouni Annass (Song from the musical "Al Mahatta")	People Asked Me	Mansour Rahbani; Ziad Rahbani	Voix de l'Orient
1987	Maarefti Feek	What I Know About You	Assi & Mansour Rahbani; Ziad Rahbani; Joseph Harb; Joaquin Rodrigo	Relax-In
1989	Live at the Royal Festival Hall London		Assi & Mansour Rahbani; Ziad Rahbani; Sayed Darwish	Voix de l'Orient
1989	Khalleek bil Bayt	"Stay at Home"	Ziad Rahbani; Assi & Mansour Rahbani; Ziad Rahbani; Joseph Harb	Relax-In
1991	Kifak Inta	How Are You	Ziad Rahbani; Joseph Harb	Relax-In
1995	Ila Assi	(Dedicated) to Assi	Assi & Mansour Rahbani	Voix de l'Orient
1999	Mesh Kayen Hayek Tkoun	You Wasn't Used To Be Like This	Ziad Rahbani; Mohamed Mohsen; Qays Bin Al Malouh	Relax-In
2000	Live at Beiteddine		Assi & Mansour Rahbani; Ziad Rahbani; Sayed Darwish; Mohamed Younes Alqadi	EMI
2002	Wala Kif	Les feuilles mortes	Ziad Rahbani; Jacques Prévert & Joseph Kosma; Jerry Leiber & Mike Stoller	Relax-In
2010	Eh Fi Amal	Yes There's Hope	Assi & Mansour Rahbani; Ziad Rahbani	Fayrouz Productions

=== Stage and radio ===
Year	Original Title	Translation	Producer	Songwriter(s)	Vocalists	Label	Main Tracks
1973	Sahriye	Evening	Ziad Rahbani	Ziad Rahbani	Joseph Sakr; Marwan Mahfouz; Georgette Sayegh	Voix de l'Orient	Ya Bint Al Maawin; Dallouni Al Aynayn Al Soud; Fi Oyoun Btebki; El Hala Taabana Ya Leila
1974	Nazl el sourour	Happiness Hotel	Ziad Rahbani	Ziad Rahbani; Franz Liszt; Gerardo Matos Rodriguez	Ziad Rahbani; Joseph Sakr; Carmen Lebbos; Sami Haouat	Voix de l'Orient	Baatilak Ya Habib Al Rouh; Jayi Maa Al Shaab Al Maskin; Mashi El Hal
1978	Bennesbeh Labokra Chou	What About Tomorrow	Ziad Rahbani	Ziad Rahbani; Joseph Sakr; Sami Haouat; Nabila Zaitouni	Ziad Rahbani; Joseph Sakr; Sami Haouat; Nabila Zeitouni	Zida	Al Bosta; Ismaa Ya Reda
1980	Film Ameriki Tawil	The American Motion Picture	Ziad Rahbani	Ziad Rahbani	Ziad Rahbani; Joseph Sakr; Sami Haouat; Mona Maraashli	Zida	Rajiaa Bi Izn Allah; Ya Zaman Al Ta'ifiya
1985	Shi Feshil	Failure	Ziad Rahbani	Ziad Rahbani	Ziad Rahbani; Joseph Sakr; Sami Haouat; Mona Saidun	Voice of Beirut	
1985	Ana Mush Kafer	I Am Not an Infidel	Ziad Rahbani	Ziad Rahbani	Ziad Rahbani; Farouq Al Koussa; Stephanie Stephano	Relax-In	Ana Mush Kafer
1986	Bhal Shakel	Oriental Jazz Concert Live At Buc, Irwin Hall	Ziad Rahbani	Ziad Rahbani; Frédéric Chopin, Antonio Carlos Jobim; Thelonious Monk; Charlie Parker		Aprodisco	
1987	El Akl Zineh	The Mind Is Decorative	Ziad Rahbani	Ziad Rahbani	Ziad Rahbani	Sawt Al Shaab	
1992	Lawla Fushat Al Amal	If It Weren't For Hope	Ziad Rahbani	Ziad Rahbani	Grace Aoun; Toufic Kerbaj	Relax-In	
1993	Bi Khsous Al Karameh Wal Shaab Al Anid	About Dignity and Stubborn People	Ziad Rahbani	Ziad Rahbani	Carmen Lebbos	Relax-In	
1993	Tabeh La Shi Tebeh Shi	Following Something That's Following Something	Ziad Rahbani	Ziad Rahbani	Ziad Rahbani; Salma Mosfi	Relax-In	
1996	Al Fasl Al Akher	The Last Part	Ziad Rahbani	Ziad Rahbani; Antonio Carlos Jobim; Astrud Gilberto	Ziad Rahbani; Carmen Lebbos; Salma Mosfi	Cairo Beirut Audio	
2006	W Noss Alf 500	1000/2=500	Ziad Rahbani	Ziad Rahbani; Baz Luhrmann		Bankers Assurance SAL	
2008	Live at Damascus Citadel		Ziad Rahbani	Ziad Rahbani; Sayed Darwish; Mohamed Younes Al Kadi	Ziad Rahbani; Bassel Daoud; Rasha Rizk	Art Line	

== Honours ==
- Commander of the National Order of the Cedar (Lebanon, July 28, 2025; posthumously).
