= Fairuz al-Halabiya =

Syrian singer and musician

Fairuz al-Ḥalabiya فيروز الحلبية

Background information
- Also known as: Fairuz Mamish
- Born: Rachel Samocha; 1895; Aleppo, Ottoman Syria
- Origin: Syria
- Died: 1955 (aged 59–60) Istanbul, Turkey
- Genres: Arabic music
- Occupation: Singer
- Instruments: Vocals; oud
- Spouse: Hussein Awni Pasha

Rachel Samocha (1895–1955), known professionally as Fairuz al-Ḥalabiya (Arabic: فيروز الحلبية, lit. 'Fairouz of Aleppo') or Fairuz Mamish (فيروز ماميش), was a Syrian singer, who was mainly active in Damascus, Beirut and Cairo. Lebanese singer Nouhad Haddad, known as Fairuz, adopted the stage name as a sign of admiration for her.

== Biography ==
She was born in Aleppo to a Jewish family, and resided in Al Jamiliyeh neighborhood. She worked mainly in Damascus, Beirut and Cairo. She was also a talented oud player, and recorded several songs accompanied by the famous violinist Sami al-Shawa and the Jewish oud player Shehadeh Saada. She was also the teacher of Salih Almuhabik, the singer who represented Syria at the International Arab Music Congress held in Cairo in 1932 and who performed with her in Iraq.

She is also remembered from an event in January 1920 in which the song, "Ye Malikaan Ezz Nasran" ("Oh Great Victorious King", that was composed by Aleppo musician Ahmed El-Oubry), became famous after she sang it in honor of the king of Arab Kingdom of Syria (who later became king Faisal I of Iraq) when he visited Aleppo. A song that gained national status after her performance. She also sang the national anthem before him: "I saw the sun after it shone. I was fascinated by her beautiful looks and asked the full moon who he loved fiercely, and he complained and cried: the love of the homeland."

== Personal life ==
According to the prevailing opinion, which is widespread in several sources, Fayrouz al-Halabiyya married a Turkish officer named Hussein Awni Pasha, moved with him to Istanbul in the 1940s and died there in 1955.

However, the Digital Historical Archive website (Dar al-Watha’iq al-Raqmiya al-Tarihiyya) presents a different version: According to this documentation, she married Mr. Moise (Moshe) Menshi, gave birth to a son named Edward, and her husband and son traveled to Palestine, and she remained in Aleppo for a long time. According to the same source, it was only in 1982 that she arrived in Israel (possibly via Istanbul), met her son, and died in Israel.
