= Pascale Sakr =

Pascale Sakr باسكال إتيان صقر
- Born: Pascale Etienne Sakr; September 23, 1964 (age 61); Zahlé, Lebanon
- Origin: Ain Ebel, Lebanon
- Genres: Lebanese Music
- Website: www.pascalesakr.com
- Education: Law degree

Pascale Etienne Sakr (Arabic: باسكال إتيان صقر; born September 23, 1964) is a Lebanese singer. She was born in Zahlé, Lebanon to Maronite parents from Ain Ebel, south of Lebanon. She performs a leading character in many musicals. She graduated from law school in 1987.

She's known for performing "Ardak el Karami" (Your land is dignity) a Lebanese patriotic song and "Waad Ya Lebnan" (Promise O Lebanon) Lebanese patriotic song remembering and honouring President Bashir Gemayel.

== Biography ==
She is also the daughter of Lebanese nationalist Etienne Sakr, a former member of the Lebanese Forces and Leader of the Far-Right Guardians of the Cedars and to Alexandra Sakr. She is the oldest of 3 children and her younger sister is also a Lebanese pop star Karol Sakr. She started singing at a very young age. Her repertoire includes many languages including Lebanese Arabic, French, and English.

Pascale Sakr has also been active in theatre she has starred in lead role of the play Wadi Chamseen and Sawret Chaab.

== Personal life ==
Pascale Sakr is married to Karl Zacca and has two children, Alexander and Annabel.

== Discography ==
Songs

- "Sarek Makatibi" Music by Elias Rahbani
- "Risho el Fil" Music by Elias Rahbani
- "Maoul Music" by Elias Rahbani
- "Biddallak Sayfi" Music by Mansour Rahbani
- "Ardak el Karami" Music by Antoine Gebara
- "Waad Ya Lebnan" Music by Elias Rahbani
- "Gharrabou" Music by Melhem Barakat
- "Nasheed al Ward" Music by Wajdy Shaya. Lyrics by Anwar Salman
- "Oh Babe" By Elias Rahbani
- "Sad Is My Story" By Elias Rahbani
- "Ya Hami el Hima" By Wajdy Shaya. Lyrics by Hassan Saad
- "Yemken By Wajdy Shaya" Lyrics by Anwar Salman
- "Am Yenzel el Talj" by Elias Rahbani
- "Jayi Papa" Noel by Elias Rahbani

== Awards ==
Year	Awarded by	Category
1981	Rostock Festival (Germany)	For song "Oh Babe"
