= Safar Barlik (film) =

- Directed by: Henry Barakat
- Written by: Rahbani Brothers
- Produced by: Naser el-Attasy
- Starring: Fairuz; Nasri Shamseddine; Huda; Assi Rahbani; Berj Fazalian; Salah Tizani; Salwa Haddad
- Edited by: Mohammed Abbas; Khalil Ghamash
- Music by: Rahbani Brothers
- Production company: Phenicia Films
- Distributed by: United Trade and Cinema Company
- Release date: 1 January 1967
- Running time: 115 minutes
- Country: Lebanon
- Language: Arabic

Safar Barlik (Arabic: سفر برلك) is a 1967 Lebanese musical and war film directed by Henry Barakat. The film stars Fairuz, Nasri Shamseddine, Huda, Assi Rahbani, Berj Fazlian, Salah Tizani and Salwa Haddad. It was filmed in the northern villages of Beit Chabab and Douma in Lebanon.

== Plot ==
Set in Lebanon in 1914, during the first world war, the Ottoman Empire is trying to starve the Lebanese people by stopping wheat from entering the country. The Empire is also taking men and forcing them into slavery and among these men is Abdo, the fiance of Adla. When Adla is taken, she searches for Abdo.

== Cast ==
- Fairuz as Adla
- Nasri Shamseddine as Elmoukhtar
- Huda as Zoumorod
- Assi Rahbani as Abou Ahmed
- Berj Fazlian as Re'fat Bek
- Rafic Sabeii as Abou Darwish
- Salwa Haddad as Oum Youssef
- Joseph Nassif as Elhasoon
- Layla Karam as Zahia
- Salah Tizani as Fares
- Abdulallah Homsi as Asad
- Ahmed Khalifa as Haji Noula
- Ihssan Sadek as Abdo

== Music ==
Notable songs from the film include:

- "Ya Tayr" (Oh Bird! يا طير)
- "Allamouni Henni Allamouni" (they taught me your love علّموني هنّي علّموني)
- "Ya Ahl El Dar" (Lords of the mansion يا أهل الدار)
