= Myriam Klink =

Lebanese model, singer and activist

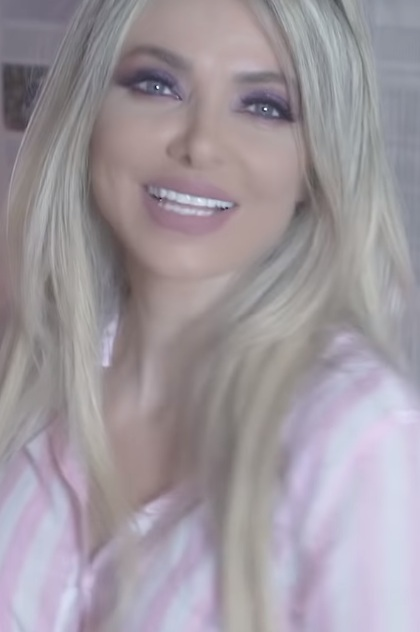
Myriam Klink, The Mask music video, Nov 2020.

Myriam Klink (Arabic: ميريام كلينك) is a Lebanese model and singer.

== Personal life ==
Klink is of Serbian descent, and identifies as Orthodox Christian.

== Controversies ==
In 2012 she shot a music video for her second song titled "Klink revolution" in which she blatantly criticizes the reigning political class of Lebanon. The video featured Klink in tight, revealing leather clothes holding a machine gun in a cemetery. Both a priest and a sheikh have filed two legal cases against Klink for filming in a cemetery, saying that she has defiled the sanctity of the dead. The religious figures forced Lebanese OTV channel's variety show "Sorry Bas" to cut Klink's video after airing it.

In December 2012 Klink announced that she will run for the Lebanese parliamentary elections of June 2013. During a January 2013 interview she discussed a number of her positions including her support for the amendment of the current nationality law that forbids foreign husbands of Lebanese wives and their children from obtaining Lebanese citizenship. She also supports civil marriage as an option and the setting up of temporary camps for Syrian refugees, and eventually doing away with sectarian quotas in the government. Klink justified Hizbollah's attachment to its arms but condemned the party for using its military strength against other Lebanese factions and citizens. In 2013, Myriam participated in Al Jadeed TV's reality show al-za'im (الزعيم) where young candidates to the Lebanese parliamentary elections showcase their agendas. Klink was visiting the Beirut suburb of hay-al-sellom where a firecracker was thrown to her face resulting in respiratory injury and the transportation of Klink to a medical facility.

In August 2013, Myriam claimed through her Facebook profile that she caught a couple having sex in her garden. She alleged that she threatened the couple at gunpoint, shooting a hunting gun in the air to startle them from their intimate position. The incident was also heavily mediatized. Shortly after the trespassing incident, Klink faced criticism again when she announced that she named her donkey "Fairuz", after the famous Lebanese singer.

In October 2013, Klink strongly criticized the Arabs' Got Talent jury members for admitting a participant whose talent was eating live snakes to the next round. Myriam, who's an animal welfare activist, called the talent show participant a beast and wished he ate the jury members instead.

The already strained relationship between Klink and fellow model Joelle Hatem intensified when Klink criticized the acts of the Lebanese Forces militia during the Lebanese Civil War causing the two models to engage in mutual public swearing and defamation. The debate rose again to public attention in December 2013 when Klink threatened to release a sex tape of Hatem with her unnamed ex-boyfriend. Hatem denied Klink's claims stating that such footage does not exist. The two models have filed lawsuits against one another.

In the aftermath of the Alexa winter storm of December 2013, Myriam announced that she will pose for a nude photoshoot in the snow as a statement of solidarity with the refugees of the Syrian conflict living in makeshift camps in Lebanon. Further to her announcement, Myriam was quoted in a message to her Facebook followers expressing her wish to spend a night in a Syrian refugee tent during the storm to relieve the displaced Syrians pain.

During the long-delayed Lebanese presidential election held on October 31, 2016, one member of Parliament anonymously voted for Myriam Klink, drawing laughter. Parliamentary Speaker Nabih Berri ruled her vote invalid because "She's Orthodox", alluding to Lebanese political tradition of selecting a Maronite Catholic for President. (Michel Aoun was ultimately elected.)

In February 2017 Klink along with another Lebanese singer Jad Khalife released a controversial music video titled "Goal", the video then was banned by the country's justice ministry due to the appearance of a little girl dancing with Klink on the bed, the presence of the little girl amounted to child “exploitation.” as the lyrics of the song include several sexual innuendos.
