= Seferberlik =

Mobilization effected by the Ottoman Empire during the Second Balkan War and WWI

The Seferberlik (Note: Also written Safarbarlik, Safarberlik, or Seferbarlik.) (from Ottoman Turkish: سفربرلك, lit. 'mobilisation'; Arabic: النفير العام, romanized: an-nafīr al-ʿāmm, lit. 'the general call to arms') was the mobilisation effected by the late Ottoman Empire during the Second Balkan War of 1913 and World War I from 1914 to 1918, which involved the forced conscription of Lebanese, Palestinian, Syrian, and Kurdish men to fight on its behalf as well as the deportation of 'numerous Lebanese & Syrian & Kurdish families' (5,000 according to one contemporary account) to Anatolia under Djemal (Cemal) Pasha's orders. Lebanese Syrians and Kurdish men accused of desertion were executed, and some 300,000 of the Arabs and Kurds who stayed behind died in the Lebanon famine, as Lebanon and Syria lost 75 to 90 percent of their crop production. Prostitution and cannibalism were also mentioned in reports or memoirs written after the end of the war.

== Terminology ==
The Ottoman Turkish word سفربرلك (seferberlik) is a compound of the Arabic noun سفر (safar, 'campaign'), the Persian suffix ـبر (-bar, '-carrier'), and the Ottoman suffix ـلق (-lık, forming abstract nouns), and means 'mobilisation'. The Modern Turkish expression umumî seferberlik has been translated into Arabic as النفير العام (an-nafīr al-ʿāmm, 'the general call to arms').

As explained by Najwa al-Qattan,

Originally an Ottoman Turkish term, seferberlik was part of official state discourse referring to wartime mobilisation either during the Second Balkan War or World War I which followed it. Announcements calling for mobilisation were posted in public areas in Ottoman towns and distributed to local leaders, and the word seferberlik was prominently printed on top.

Ahmen Amin Saleh Murshid, a historian of Al-Medina, and Zakarya Muhammad al-Kenisi, a historian who specialised in old Ottoman Turkish, disagree over the general meaning of the term 'Seferberlik'. Saleh Murshid believes the term means a collective deportation, especially in the context of the inhabitants of Medina under the leadership of Fakhri Pasha. Saleh Murshid also argues that historians should not rely exclusively on dictionaries and documents to translate Ottoman Turkish terms into Arabic since lived experiences and popular understandings of these terms are crucial in understanding them. Zakarya Muhammad al-Kenisi argues that the word 'Seferberlik' refers to the preparation of armies for war or a military campaign. He argues that Ottoman Turkish translations regarding the history of Medina contain substantial errors that result in different understandings of Medina's history. Although the two scholars disagree over the meaning of the word Seferberlik, they are in agreement about the events that the term Seferberlik describes.

== History ==
The Seferberlik was a mass mobilization effected by officials of the late Ottoman Empire during the Second Balkan War of 1913 and World War I from 1914 to 1918. It involved the forced conscription of Lebanese, Palestinian, Syrian, and Kurdish men to fight on the Empire's behalf as well as the deportation of 'numerous Lebanese & Syrian & Kurdish families' (5,000 according to one contemporary account) to Anatolia under Djemal (Cemal) Pasha's orders.

The Seferberlik met with resistance since young Lebanese and Syrian men could not relate to the rationale behind the Ottoman wars. When the Seferberlik was announced they sometimes hid; later some of them fled during battles. To counter the resistance to conscription and desertion from war fronts, the government sent bounty hunters to roam city streets and catch young men and deserters. Officials are said to have carried ropes with which to encircle, tie up and carry off boys and men on the run. Many Lebanese, Syrian and Kurdish men accused of desertion were executed.

The Seferberlik resulted in the Lebanon famine, as Lebanon & Syria lost 75 to 90 percent of their crop production. Some 300,000 Arabs and Kurds are believed to have died in the famine. In his book Irafat Shami ‘atiq; sira dhattyya wa suwar dimashqiyya (Confessions of an Old Damascene, Biography and Damascene Pictures) the Syrian journalist Abd al-Ghani al-Utri suggests that Syrians have treated bread as sacred since the famine. The WWI diary of a Palestinian Ottoman soldier, Ihsan Turjman, describes the scarcity of foodstuffs and the overpricing of sugar, rice and grains. In al-Ghazzi’s book Shirwal Barhum (The Pants of Barhum), people fought over lemon and orange rinds while children picked watermelon rinds from the mud during the Seferberlik. Siham Turjman recounts how her mother, who was then 14 years old, told her how everything was expensive during the Seferberlik and how people would line up in front of the bakery at midnight to buy burnt, and overpriced bread. Memoirs and reports published shortly after the end of the Great War describe the horrific scenes of famine that filled Lebanon’s streets. The Seferberlik is said to have been associated with cannibalism during the famine. In Antun Yamin’s two-two-volume history Lubnan fi al-Harb (published in 1919) a chapter entitled 'Stories that Would Shake Rocks' gives a detailed report of people attacking the corpses of dead animals and children and eating them. In Fragments of Memory, Hanna Minar recounts the childhood memories of his father:

What are they supposed to do during this famine? Bide your time...people will eat each other when winter comes. They aren't to be blamed. During the Safar Barrlik, mothers ate their children. They became like cats and ate their children... What good will sticks or guns do? They'll only hasten death and bring people relief... Let's be patient... A way out may come from some unknown source.

In his diary entry for April 29, 1915, a soldier in the Ottoman military headquarters in Jerusalem, Ihsan Turjman (1893–1917), mentioned his encounter with a prostitute in the streets of the city and how the sight filled him with concern for all the women who found that they could not survive without prostituting themselves.' Yusuf Shalhub, the famous Zajal poet, lamented the deterioration of living standards during the War, which led many women to sell their bodies in exchange for bread.

=== Seferberlik in Medina (Saudi Arabia) ===
In Medina's memory of the war, 'Seferberlik' refers specifically to the collective deportation of the city's inhabitants on the famous Hijaz railway. According to current research on the topic in Medina, Seferberlik invokes memories of humiliation and the destruction of social and familial structure for the original inhabitants of the city. Families, women and children were dragged to the train and abandoned in Greater Syria, Iraq, and Turkey. According to the same source, only 140 people remained in the city, and they suffered from food shortages caused by the Ottoman military leader Fakhri Pasha.

== Seferberlik in Arabic literature, filmography, and historiography ==
Seferberlik and the memories associated with it constitute an important element in Arabic literature. Poets and authors whose parents endured the hardships associated with the Seferberlik received first-hand accounts of their war experiences and the ways in which the war affected society in Greater Syria. These authors and poets have used the material of the Seferberlik in various contexts. Some authors such as Nadia Al-Ghazzi, Hanna Mina...etc used it in novels. Authors of popular histories of the early 20th century mentioned the Seferberlik in the context of the war, treating it as an essential event in the history of this period. Many history books were produced, including Ṭarāʼif wa-ṣuwar min tārīkh Dimashq (Anecdotes and Pictures from the History of Damascus) by Hānī Khayyir and Ya Mal el-Sham (The Daughter of Damascus) by Siham Turjman. Novelists, journalists, and playwrights used the oral accounts of those who experienced WWI, and the miseries of the Seferberlik to produce an impressive body of literary and dramatic production. Scenes of the Seferberlik depict the miserable conditions people lived through.

In the 20th century Arab literary and historical accounts of the Seferberlik period became synonymous with the famine that overran the Levant and especially Mount Lebanon in 1916. The term Seferberlik was also used to refer to the specific event that took place during the war. In Siham Turjma’ s book Daughters of Damascus the chapter on the Seferberlik recounts the memories of her father who was conscripted "to go to the Seferberlik" (i.e. the war) and who worked as a telegrapher and communication officer on the front lines. InAbdul Fattah Qal'aji's Urs Ḥalabī wa-hikāyāt min Safar Barlik (Aleppo Wedding and Stories from the Seferberlik) the Seferberlik is a synonym for the war and its events.

The Seferberlik has also emerged as a theme in Arab films and television programming. The Lebanese Rahbani brothers produced the war film Safar Barlik in the 1960s. The Syrian drama series Ikhwat al-Turab (Brothers in Soil), directed by Najdat Anzour in the 1990s, shows soldiers being separated from their families and loved ones because of the Seferberlik. In 2023 a soap opera called Safar Barlik aired on Saudi-headquartered television channel MBC during Ramadan.

== Additional sources ==
- Al-Qattan, N. (n.d.). Remembering the Great War in Syrian and Lebanon, everything including the plague.
- Al-Qattan, N. (2004). Safarbarlik: Ottoman Syria and the Great War. In T. Philipp & C. Schumann (Eds.), in From the Syrian Land to the States of Syria and Lebanon, (pp. 163–173). Beirut: Beirut: Argon Verlag Wurzburg.
- Mina, H. (1975). Fragments of Memory: A Story of a Syrian Family. Interlink World Fiction. ISBN 9781566565479.
- Phillipp, T.; Schaebler, B. (1998). The Syrian Land: Processes of Integration and Fragmentation. Bilad al-Sham from the 18th to the 20th Century. Franz Steiner Verlag. ISBN 3515073094.
- Schilcher, L. S. (1992). The Famine of 1915-1918 in Greater Syria. In hn P. Spagnolo (Ed.), Problems of the Modern Middle East in Historical Perspective (pp. 229–258). Oxford: Oxford University Press.
- Tamari, S.; Turjman, I. S. (2011). Year of the Locust: A Soldier's Diary and the Erasure of Palestine's Ottoman Past. University of California Press. ISBN 978-0-520-94878-5.
- Lubnān fī al-ḥarb, aw, Dhikrá al-ḥawādith wa-al-maẓālim fī Lubnān fī al-Ḥarb al-ʻUmūmīyah : 1914-1919, لبنان في الحرب : أو ذكرى الحوادث والمظالم في لبنان في الحرب العمومية، ١٩١٤
