= Oussama Rahbani =

Lebanese musician and composer (born 1965)

Oussama Rahbani أسامة الرحباني
- Born: 9 December 1965 (age 60); Antelias, Lebanon
- Occupations: Composer; musician
- Father: Mansour Rahbani
- Relatives: Marwan Rahbani (brother); Ghadi Rahbani (brother); Assi Rahbani (uncle); Elias Rahbani (uncle); Fairuz (aunt); Ziad Rahbani (cousin)

Oussama Al Rahbani (Arabic: أسامة الرحباني; born 9 December 1965) is a Lebanese musician and composer. He is the son of the Lebanese composer, musician, and poet, Mansour Rahbani.

Oussama completed his education at Collège des Frères Maristes Champville until 1973, Collège des Apôtres, Jounieh until 1982 and finally Kaslik, where he got his Lebanese baccalaureate. He studied history at the Lebanese University. A keen soccer fan, he played as an amateur.

He took piano lessons from a young age and music courses at Berklee College of Music in 1990 and 1995. His classical music and jazz music was influenced by his brother, Marwan Rahbani, and his cousin, Ziad Rahbani. Oussama's background in classical music developed alongside Marwan, and Ghadi Rahbani. He is also an avid music collector.

== Career ==
1978 to 1980, he was a choirmaster of the youth choir at St. Elie's church in Antelias. From 1982 to 1986, he performed as a musician with the Rahbani brothers and in the show Hello Beirut by Marwan and Ghadi Rahbani. The show toured a number of Arab countries. In 1986, he founded the Jazz Gate band and performed at the 1987 Byblos International Festival and in 1989 at Casino du Liban.

In 1988, he branched out to composing children's songs for television programs produced by Ghadi and Marwan Rahbani and later composed "Helm Laylit el Sharq" for the Lebanese Caracalla dancing group. He composed music for Chouchou's famous play Carambole directed by Roger Assaf.

In 1993, he participated as a composer and conductor in the musical play Al Wassiya by Mansour Rahbani and in Al Inqilab by Marwan & Ghadi Rahbani, also acting in the play.

In 1997, he released an album entitled Al Nizam al Jadid and composed the soundtrack of the TV series Al Wasaj by Najdat Anzour. A year later, in 1998, he composed music for the play Last Days of Socrates by Mansour Rahbani and in 2000, Wa kama fil yawm al taleth written by Mansour Rahbani. He also participated in a modern orchestration of the Maronite Mass by Mansour Rahbani and released his own album Bi Sabah el Alf el Talet.

In 2001, he took part as composer and conductor in the musical play Abou Tayeb al Mutanabi by Mansour Rahbani and produced a Russian night concert in Lebanon with St. Petersburg Philharmonic Orchestra conducted by Nicolai Alexyev. In 2003, he took part as a composer in Moulouk al Tawaef, a musical play by Mansour Rahbani. In 2004, he wrote an Arabic musical adaptation of Romeo and Juliet, titled Akher Yom. The choreography for the adaptation was done by Debbie Allen. He also composed Hekm el Reayen, another musical play by Mansour Rahbani.

Between 2004 and 2007, he was a consultant in the reality TV show Star Academy produced by LBC, giving musical culture lessons to the aspiring contestants. In 2005, he composed, orchestrated and produced Gebran wel Nabi, an adaptation of The Prophet by Gibran Khalil Gibran. It was performed at the Byblos International Festival and later at Forum de Beyrouth. In 2007, he composed for Zenobia, a musical play Mansour Rahbani followed by The Return of the Phoenix, performed at the Byblos International Festival, at Casino du Liban and in Dubai. In 2009, there was a remake of the musical play Sayf 840 by Mansour Rahbani. Along with Ghadi and Marwan, Rahbani performed the remake at Byblos festival, and at Casino du Liban. In 2011, he produced, composed and orchestrated the album La Bidayi w la Nihayi featuring Hiba Tawaji. Since 2007, he has been working with Tawaji, and they made two albums together with new songs and one live album. He also composed the musical play Don Quixote by Marwan and Ghadi Rahbani, performed at Byblos International Festival. He also took part in Ehdeniyat Festival and the Palais des Congrès Lebanon with Hiba Tawaji and Wadih Abi Raad.

He is also known for having written songs for a number of artists, produced music videos and a great number of advertisements and jingles for various business and cultural entities and for public awareness campaigns and charities.
