= Elias Rahbani =

Lebanese composer, musician, and conductor (1938–2021)

Elias Rahbani إلياس رحباني
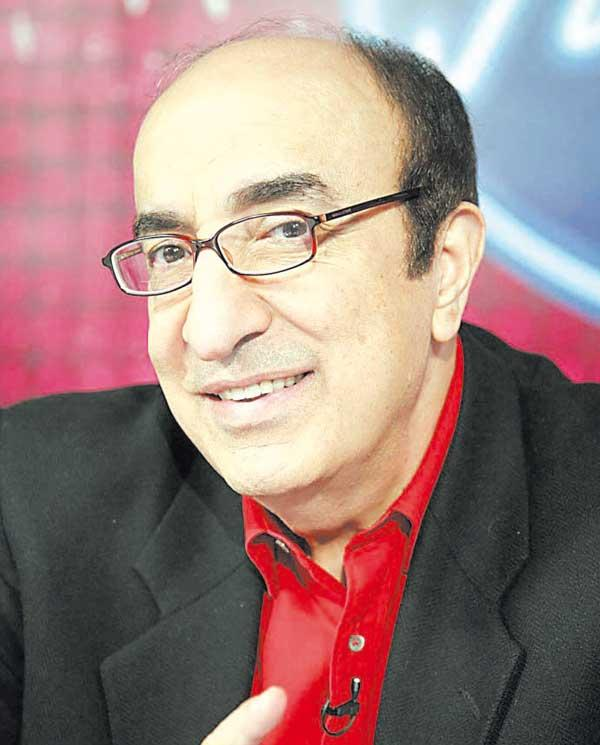
- Rahbani in 1990

Background information
- Born: Elias Hanna Al Rahbani; 26 June 1938; Antelias, French Lebanon
- Died: 4 January 2021 (aged 82) Beirut, Lebanon
- Occupations: Musician; producer; lyricist; composer
- Years active: 1962–2021
- Family
- Children: Ghassan
- Relatives: Assi Rahbani (brother); Mansour Rahbani (brother); Fairuz (sister-in-law); Ziad Rahbani (nephew); Oussama Rahbani (nephew)

Elias Hanna Al Rahbani (Arabic: إلياس حنا الرحباني; 26 June 1938 – 4 January 2021) was a Lebanese musician, composer, songwriter, orchestra conductor, and reality television personality, sitting as judge on a number of talent shows. He composed more than 2,500 songs, including 2,000 in Arabic. He wrote the soundtrack for more than 25 films, a number of TV series, and also composed musical scores for the piano. He composed songs for a number of artists, including Sabah and his sister-in-law Fairuz.

== Early life ==
Rahbani was born into a musical family. His older siblings were Assi and Mansour, known as the Rahbani brothers. He studied music at the Lebanese Academy (1945–1958) and did his specialization at the National Music College from 1955 to 1956. His older brothers also arranged private lessons for him for almost ten years, under the supervision of French music professors.

In 1957, at the age of nineteen, Rahbani wanted to continue his musical studies in Moscow but injured his right hand, which meant the end of his dreams of becoming a major piano player. He later trained with his left hand and concentrated on music composition instead.

== Career ==
In 1958, Rahbani had his break, at the age of twenty, when the Arabic Service of the BBC contacted him about composing forty songs and writing the soundtracks to thirteen BBC Arabic radio productions. In 1962, he wrote "Ma Ahlaha" (ما أحلاها) for Lebanese singer Nasri Shamseddine and became a program director and musical consultant for Radio Lebanon, where he also met his future wife, Nina Khalil. The couple married and stayed together for the rest of their lives. Rahbani stayed at Radio Lebanon until 1972 but also continued his career as a record producer with a number of record companies in Lebanon. At the beginning of the Lebanese Civil War in 1976, he moved to Paris.

Rahbani has to his record hundreds of successful Lebanese and pan-Arab music, some in foreign musical adaptations, but mostly in Arabic music. Of his foreign songs, some notable titles include "La Guerre est finie", sung by Lebanese Armenian singer Manuel Menengichian and "Mory", a sea song sung by Lebanese singer Sami Clark.

Rahbani accused Saber Rebaï of plagiarizing his music with the song "Atahadda al 'aalam" (أتحدى العالم). When the songwriter Khaled Bakri and his record company, Rotana Records, denied the charges, Rahbani filed a lawsuit, in which a committee of musicians noted similarities between the Saber Rebai song and Rahbani's musical score "Nina Maria", and ordered Rotana Records to withdraw the album and add credits to Rahbani.

Rahbani has written numerous songs for Fairuz and Sabah. Other Rahbani compositions have been sung by Wadih Safi, Melhem Barakat, Nasri Shamseddine, Majida El Roumi, and contemporary singers including Julia Boutros, Pascale Sakr, and Haifa Wehbe.

In 1996, Rahbani published the poetry collection Nafizat el Omr (A window to my life). In 2001, he composed a song for the Organisation internationale de la Francophonie summit held in Beirut, Lebanon.

== Awards ==
From many of his awards, the Athenes Festival Award for "La guerre est finie", The Youth Award for Classical Music in 1964, an award for a musical score in 1970, Cinema award for International Advertisement Film Award in Venice in 1977, 2nd Award for the London International Advertising Festival in 1995, various awards from Brazil, Greece and Bulgaria, Award for Best Song for "Mory" at the Rostock Festival in Germany. He was also awarded an honorary doctorate from the Barrington University in Washington, and the American University in Asturias, Spain.

== Television ==
Rahbani has taken part in a number of televised talent shows in Lebanon and the Arab world, including being a judge on the singing competition SuperStar. He also took part in the launch of Rotana Academy for Teaching of Music in 2004, but left soon afterwards. He was honorary judge for seasons 10 and 11 of Star Academy.

== Personal life ==
Elias Rahbani was married to Nina Maria Khalil. They had three children together, including Ghassan. He died on 4 January 2021, at the Rafik Hariri University Hospital, from complications due to COVID-19 during the coronavirus pandemic in Lebanon.

=== Family tree ===
Rahbani family
  - Assi (1923–1986) + Fairuz (born 1934 or 1935)
    - Ziad (1956–2025)
    - Hali (1958–2026)
    - Layal (1960–1988)
    - Rima (born 1965)
  - Mansour (1925–2009) + Thereze
    - Marwan (born 1958)
    - Ghadi (born 1960)
    - Oussama (born 1965)
  - Elias (1938–2021) + Nina
    - Ghassan (born 1964)
    - Jad (born 1968)
    - Ilham

== Discography ==
=== Studio albums ===
Year	Title	Translation	Label	Notable Track(s)
1972	Mosaic of the Orient Vol. 1		Voix de l'Orient	"I Love You Lina" "Let's Dance"
1974	Mosaic of the Orient Vol. 2		Voix de l'Orient	"Hey Dabke" "My Heart Song (Alby Tayir)"
1976	Arabic Nursery Rhymes & Songs		Voix de l'Orient	"Kellon Endon Siyyarat"
1977	Elias Rahbani & His Orchestra		Voix de l'Orient; Warner; Gélatine	"Green Bird"
1978	With Love		Voix de l'Orient	"Liza Liza" "Diala"
1978	Festival		Oscar Plakçılık	"El Helwa Di"
1982	Don't Say Good-Bye		Rahbania	"Don't Say Good-Bye"
1998	Allegro		Virgin	"Allegro" "Farewell to You"
1999	Rondo		Virgin	"Nina Maria" "Seeds of Love"
2002	L'amoureux de Paris	In Love with Paris	Cairo Beirut Audio	"Nuits de Paris"
2006	Morceaux Classiques Pour Piano Composition Et Interprétation	Classic Pieces for Piano	Mass Music	"Danse #2 Opus 2"
2008	Bonjour Colette	Hello Colette	[Not on Label]	"Bonjour Colette"
2008	Moi je t'aime	I Love You	[Not on Label]	"Moi je t'aime"

=== Collaboration albums ===
Year	Title	Translation	Label	Notable Track(s)
1979	Belly Dance Fever (with Ziad Rahbani)		Voix de l'Orient	"El Helwa Di" "Zeina's Dance" "Tol'it Ya Mahla Nourha" "Love Dance"
1981	Kenna Sawa (with Samir Hanna)	Samir Hanna Sings Elias Rahbani	Rahbania	"Kenna Sawa"
1982	Wadi Shamsine (with Sabah)	Sabah Sings Elias Rahbani	Rahbania	"Waadouni Wnatarouni" "Ra'esni Hayk"
1982	Mech Ader (with Adonis Akl)	Adonis Akl Sings Elias Rahbani	Rahbania	"Mech Ader"
1982	Interprètent Les Succès D'antan (with Victor Hanna)	Sing the Oldies	Rahbania	"Marinella" "Si tu t'en vas"
1982	Kezzabi (with Al Amir Al Saghir)	Le Petit Prince Sings Elias Rahbani	Rahbania	"Kezzabi" "Je n'ai pas changé"
1996	Shu Sar (with Al Amir Al Saghir)	Hey	Voice of Beirut	"Shu Sar"
2016	Elias Rahbani Presents Ghassan Salem (with Ghassan Salem)		Inter Gulf Media	"Lamma Shefta"

=== Soundtracks ===
Year	Title	Translation	Director
1969	Koullouna Fara'iyoun	We Are All Freedom Fighters	Gary Garabedian
1969	Wada'an Ya Loubnan	Goodbye Lebanon	Howard Avedis
1973	Dammi, Dumuu'i, Ibtisamati	My Blood, Tears and Smiles	Hussein Kamal
1974	Habibati	My Love	Henri Barakat
1974	Agmal Ayam Hayati	The Most Beautiful Years of My Life	Henri Barakat
1978	Aazef Al Layl (TV Series)	The Musician of the Night	Antoine Remy

=== Songs for Fairuz ===
Year	Title	Album	Label
1969	"El Oudal Menssiye"		Voix de l'Orient
1972	"La Tejeel Youm"	La gardienne des clés – musical	Voix de l'Orient
1973	"Kan Ezzaman (aka Hanna Al Sakran)"	Al Mahatta – musical	Voix de l'Orient
1973	"Ya Tayr Al Werwar"		Voix de l'Orient
1974	"Kan Anna Tahoun"	Loulou – musical	Voix de l'Orient
1975	"Kenna Netla'a"	Mays El Rim – musical	Voix de l'Orient
1975	"Ya Lor Hobbak" (with Maurice Akl)	Mays El Rim – musical	Voix de l'Orient

=== Songs for Sabah ===
Year	Title	Album	Label
1964	"Hully Dabke Ya Ba Off"		Voix de l'Orient
1964	"Sola Cha-Cha-Cha"		Voix de l'Orient
1964	"Shefto Bel Anatir"		Voix de l'Orient
1969	"Helweh W Mamshouka"	Sabah	Philips
1969	"Ya Bou El Darawich"	Sabah	Philips
1980	"Alou 'Anni Majnouneh"	Rahbaniyat Vol. 5	Voix de l'Orient
1982	"Wa'adouni Wnatarouni"	Wadi Shamsine	Rahbania
1989	"Ya Habib El Alb"	The Very Best of Sabah from Relax-In	Relax-In

=== Songs for Georgette Sayegh ===
Year	Title	Album	Label
1971	"Wardat Ain El Roumane"	Oriental Evening	Voix de l'Orient
1973	"Ya Ya Ya Nassini"	Poème d'amour	Voix de l'Orient
1974	"Arrably W Ally"	Mawsam El Tarabish	[Not on Label]
1974	"Alby Tayir (aka My Heart Song)"	Mosaic of the Orient	Voix de l'Orient
1975	"Nattarny Nattarny"	Oriental Hit Parade Vol. 3	SLD
1995	"Kel Ma Bettallaa"	Dawabni Doub	Badawist Phone
1995	"Dawabni Doub"	Dawabni Doub	Badawist Phone
1995	"Oul Oul"	Dawabni Doub	Badawist Phone
1995	"Al Ayam Al Helwa"	Dawabni Doub	Badawist Phone
1995	"Yoma Yoma"	Dawabni Doub	Badawist Phone
1995	"Byekfy Teazebny"	Dawabni Doub	Badawist Phone
1995	"Enta El Hawa"	Dawabni Doub	Badawist Phone
1995	"Be'eedak Bi Alby"	Dawabni Doub	Badawist Phone

=== Other notable songs ===
Year	Artist	Title	Album	Label
[Unknown]	Taroub	"Khodni Ila Mexik"		Badrophone
[Unknown]	Hoda	"Bahebbak Add El Bahr"		Polydor
[Unknown]	Bernard	"Souvenirs"		Melodisc
1969	Manuel	"La guerre est finie"		SLD
1971	Sammy Clark	"Please"		Pan-Vox
1973	Wadih El Safi	"Jinaddar"		Voix de l'Orient
1977	Bob Azzam	"Sana Neler Edeceğim"		S&S
1980	Samir Hanna	"Wahdi Sahran"		Voix de l'Orient
1980	Magida El Roumi	"Koul Chi Amm Yekhlass"	Magida El Roumi	Voix de l'Orient
1980	Melhem Barakat	"Kan El Zaman (aka Hanna Al Sakran)"	Rahbaniyat Vol. 7	Voix de l'Orient
1980	Aida Shalhoub	"Fi Bayt Chababikou Homr"	Rahbaniyat Vol. 4	Voix de l'Orient
1980	Mohammed Jamal	"Kenna Ana Ou Enti"	Rahbaniyat Vol. 4	Voix de l'Orient
1980	Ronza	"Kaoulak"	Rahbaniyat Vol. 4	Voix de l'Orient
1981	Julia	"C'est la vie"	C'est la vie	Rahbaniya
1981	Tony Valière	"Ose"	Ose	Rahbaniya
1988	Pascale Sakr	"Kasseeda Ya Habibi"	Taskili A Min	Relax-In
1988	Joseph Azar	"Ya Rayt Betlakini"	Mehtara B'amrak	Voix de l'Orient
1994	Lady Madonna	"La Wein Baddeh Sefer"	Safrat Al Ahlam	Music Master
1999	Wael Kfoury	"Salamat Salamat"	Hkayet A'chek	Music Box
2009	Elissa	"Law Feye"	Tesada'a Bemeen	Rotana
2017	Myriam Klink	"Ou'a Terjaali"	Ou'a Terjaali	[Not on Label]

== Sources ==
- Rahbani Brothers: Elias Rahbani biography
