= Fairuz =

Lebanese singer (born 1934 or 1935)

- فيروز
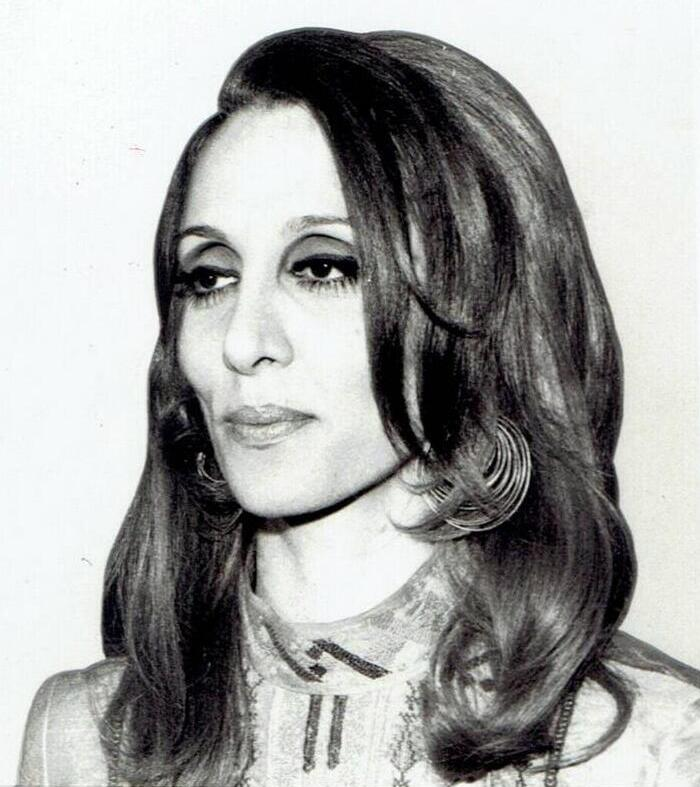
- Fairuz in 1971
- Born: Nouhad Wadie Haddad; 20 November 1934 (age 92) or 21 November 1935 (age 91) (Note: Haddad's birth year is disputed, with some sources indicating 1934 and some 1935. The Encyclopædia Britannica cites her birth date as 20 November 1934 according to the records of the Lebanese Ministry of the Interior and 21 November 1935 according to her family.); Beirut, Lebanese Republic
- Occupations: Singer; actress
- Spouse: Assi Rahbani (m. 1955; died 1986)
- Children: 4, including Ziad
- Family: see below
- Musical career
- Genres: Arabic music; Lebanese music; tarab; Assyrian folk-pop music
- Instrument: Vocals
- Works: Fairuz discography
- Years active: 1950–present
- Labels: EMI; Virgin; Voix de l'Orient; Fayrouz Productions
- Website: fairouz.com

Nouhad Wadie Haddad (Note: Arabic: نهاد وديع حداد, romanised: Nuhād Wadīʿ Ḥaddād, Lebanese Arabic pronunciation: [nʊˈhaːd waˈdiːʕ ħadˈdaːd].) (born 20 November 1934 or 21 November 1935), known professionally as Fairuz, (Note: Also spelled Fairouz, Feyrouz or Fayrouz; Arabic: فيروز, romanised: Fayrūz, pronounced [fajˈruːz].) is a Lebanese singer. She is widely considered an iconic vocalist and one of the most celebrated singers in the Arab world, as well as a symbol of modern Lebanon. She is popularly known as "The Bird of the East", (Note: Arabic: عصفورة الشرق, romanised: ʿAṣfūrat aš-Šarq.) "The Cedar of Lebanon", (Note: Arabic: أرزة لبنان, romanised: ʾArzat Lubnān.) "The Moon's Neighbor", (Note: Arabic: جارة القمر, romanised: Jārat al-Qamar.) "The Voice of Lebanon", (Note: Arabic: صوت لبنان, romanised: Ṣawt Lubnān.) and "Our Ambassador to the Stars", (Note: Arabic: سفيرتنا إلى النجوم, romanised: Safīratnā ilā n-Nujūm.) among others. (Note: Attributed to multiple references:)

Fairuz began her musical career as a teenager at the national radio station in Lebanon in the late 1940s as a chorus member. Her first major hit, "Itab", was released in 1952 and made her an instant star in the Arab world. In the summer of 1957, Fairuz held her first live performance at the Baalbeck International Festival where she was awarded with the honour of "Cavalier", the highest medal for artistic achievement by Lebanese president Camille Chamoun. Fairuz's fame spread throughout the Arab world in the 1950s and 1960s, leading her to perform outside of Lebanon in various Arab capitals, including Damascus, Amman, Cairo, Rabat, Algiers, and Tunis.

Fairuz has received honours and distinctions in multiple countries, including Lebanon, Syria, Jordan, Palestine, Tunisia, the United States, Egypt, and France. Throughout her career, she headlined at the most important venues in the world, such as Albert Hall and Royal Festival Hall in London, Carnegie Hall, Lincoln Center, and United Nations General Assembly Lobby in New York, the Olympia and Salle Pleyel in Paris, and the Odeon of Herodes Atticus in Athens.

In a career spanning over six decades, Fairuz has recorded nearly 1500 songs, released more than 80 albums, performed in 20 musicals, and sold over 150 million records worldwide, making her one of the highest selling Middle-Eastern artists of all time, and one of the best-selling music artists in the world. (Note: Attributed to multiple references:)

== Early life ==
Fairuz in 1946

Nouhad Haddad was born on 20 November, 1934 or 21 November 1935, in Beirut into a Syriac Orthodox and Maronite Christian family. Her father, Wadie, was an Assyrian born in Mardin (present-day Turkey) who moved to Lebanon to flee the Sayfo. He worked as a typesetter in a print shop. Her mother, Lisa al-Boustani, was born in the village of Dibbiyeh, Mount Lebanon. The family later moved to Zuqaq al-Blat, a neighbourhood in Beirut, where they lived in a single-room house facing the Greek Orthodox Patriarchate school and shared a kitchen with their neighbours.

By the age of ten, Nouhad had become well-known at school for her unusual singing voice. She would regularly sing during school shows and on holidays. This brought her to the attention of Mohammed Flayfel, a well-known musician and a teacher at the Lebanese Conservatory, who happened to attend one of the school's shows in February 1950. Impressed by her voice and performance, he advised her to enrol in the conservatory, which she did. At first, Nouhad's conservative father was reluctant to send her to the conservatory. At the persuasion of his brother, Nouhad's uncle, he eventually agreed to let her go on the condition that her brother accompany her.

== Music career ==
=== Early career ===
Flayfel took a close interest in Nouhad's talent. He started training her in control of intonation and poetic form, and in an audition, Nouhad was heard singing by Halim el Roumi, head of the Lebanese radio station established in 1938, one of the oldest stations in the Arab world. Roumi was impressed by her voice and noticed that it was flexible, allowing her to sing in both Arabic and Western modes. At Nouhad's request, El Roumi appointed her as a chorus singer at the radio station in Beirut, where she was paid twenty-one U.S dollars every month, which, adjusted for inflation, in 2020 would amount to one hundred ninety-five dollars. He also went on to compose several songs for her and chose for her the stage name Fairuz, which is the Arabic word for turquoise and had been adopted as a stage name by Syrian singer Fayrouz Al Halabiya.

A short while later, Fairuz was introduced to the Rahbani brothers, Assi and Mansour, who also worked at the radio station as musicians. Their chemistry was instant, and soon after, Assi started to compose songs for Fairuz. One of these songs was "Itab" (the third song he composed for her), which was an immediate success in the Arab world. It established Fairuz as one of the most prominent Arab singers at that time.

Fairuz rose to fame during the golden era of Arabic music and is one of the last figures and contributors of that time alive today. Her voice represented the 20th century's Lebanese pop culture. Throughout her career, she has established a style of universality and relatability as she made music that tackled issues ranging from adolescence and love to political plight and patriotism, even "snappy Christmas carols", which made her work accessible to all. Fairuz is known for her particularly forlorn style of music, which is a fusion of western and Arab sounds. Her music is set apart by its melancholic and nostalgic humor, along with Fairuz's stoic image as well as yearning voice, that is almost prayer-like, often described by experts as airy, clear, and flexible, different from the common ornamentation style commonly found in Arab music.

=== 1950s: Establishment of a new star ===
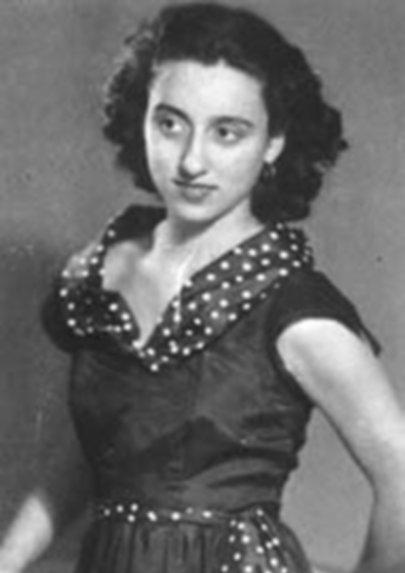
Fairuz in the 1950s

Fairuz's first large-scale concert was in 1957, as part of the Baalbeck International Festival which took place under the patronage of Lebanese President Camille Chamoun. She performed in the Folkloric section of the festival representing "The Lebanese Nights". Fairuz was paid one Lebanese pound for that show, but she and the Rahbani brothers would become staples of the festival and featured most years until the civil war in Lebanon. The trio's performances at first were just small skits, but eventually they became full-blown musical operettas, and concerts followed for many years. Fairuz amassed more fame as she and other contemporaneous Arab artists were vocal about the Palestinian cause in their conflict with Israel and produced a number of militaristic and patriotically somber songs for them.

=== 1960s–1970s: Breakthrough and critical acclaim ===
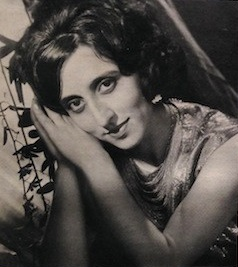
Fairuz in 1967

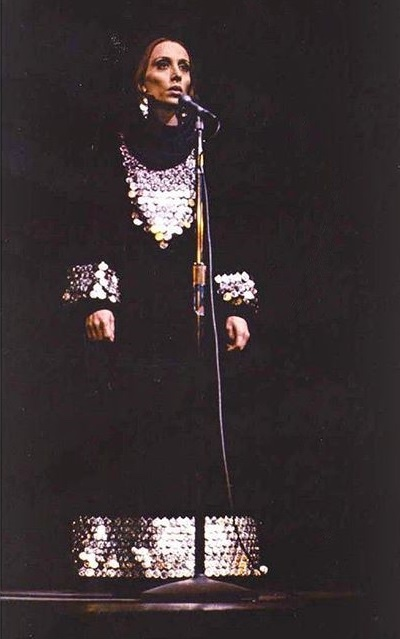
Fairuz performing in 1971

Fairuz and the Rahbani brothers started to garner more attention with their innovative ventures and went on to revolutionise the blueprint for Lebanese music. It started with incorporating western sounds into their music and eventually shaping the Lebanese style of music, since the music had to fit into a certain mould before. This mould was the dominant Egyptian style of music, in the Egyptian dialect that would typically have a duration of thirty minutes. The trio started working with their own prototype, which was shorter three-minute songs in the Lebanese dialect that would tell a story. This change was received as well as it was due to growing discontent for traditional and indigenous music. Beirut at this time was undergoing rapid modernisation and cultural expansion. Some of those who lived in the city were not of Arab background, making it harder to relate to the musical forms of the time. So when Fairuz and the Rahbani brothers introduced a more modern yet still traditional form of music, they drew in mass appeal. This helped reshape the modern Lebanese identity especially in music and would go on to make significant contributions to the history of oriental music. These songs would also customarily included commentary and themes of local and regional socio-political and historical issues.^{[33]} As the 1960s wore on, Fairuz became known as the "First Lady of Lebanese singing", as Halim Roumi dubbed her. During this period, the Rahbani brothers wrote and composed for her hundreds of famous songs, most of their operettas, and three motion pictures. In those productions, they also chose to abandon the popular improvisatory nature of Arab performances in favour of more well-rehearsed and produced ones.

In 1971, Fairuz's fame became international after her major North American tour, which was received with much excitement by the Arab-American and American communities and yielded positive reviews of the concerts. To date, Fairuz has performed in many countries around the globe, including Syria, Jordan, Iraq, Kuwait, United Arab Emirates, Qatar, Bahrain, Egypt, Tunisia, Algeria, Morocco, France, United Kingdom, Switzerland, Netherlands, Greece, Canada, United States, Mexico, Brazil, Argentina, Australia, Belgium, Italy, and her home country, Lebanon.

On 22 September, 1972, Assi suffered a brain haemorrhage and was rushed to the hospital. Fans crowded outside the hospital, praying for him and lighting candles. After three surgeries, Assi's brain haemorrhage was halted. Ziad Rahbani, the eldest son of Fairuz and Assi, at age 17, gave his mother the music of one of his unreleased songs, "Akhadou el Helween" (that he had composed to be sung by Marwan Mahfouz in "Sahriyyi" Ziad's first play). His uncle Mansour Rahbani re-wrote new lyrics for it to be called "Saalouni n'Nass" ("The People Asked Me") which talked about Fairuz being on stage for the first time without Assi. Three months after suffering the haemorrhage, Assi attended the premiere performance of that musical, Al Mahatta, in Piccadilly Theatre on Hamra Street. Elias Rahbani, Assi's younger brother, took over the orchestration and musical arrangement for the performance.

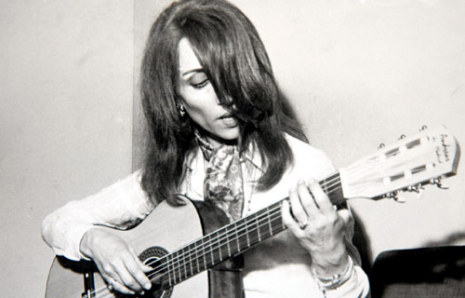
Fairuz in the 1970s

In 1978, the trio toured Europe and the Persian Gulf nations, including a concert at the Paris Olympia. As a result of this busy schedule, Assi's medical and mental health began to deteriorate. Assi Rahbani eventually died in 1986, no longer married to Fairuz, but due to the influence his family and Fairuz had in Lebanon, the factions in Beirut had a cease-fire allowing the funeral procession to travel from the Muslim side of the city to where Assi would be buried on the Christian side. Fairuz then began to work almost exclusively with Ziad Rahbani, her son on producing her music.

Amid the Lebanese Civil War, Fairuz's fame catapulted. Unlike many of her famous peers, she never left Lebanon to live abroad. She did not hold any concerts there with the exception of the stage performance of the operetta Petra, which was performed in both the western and eastern parts of the then-divided Beirut in 1978. The war lasted fifteen years (1975–1990), took 150,000 lives, and fostered a divided nation. This was the period where her role as a prominent Lebanese figure would be cemented. She and the Rahbani brothers would frequently express their dissent for the war in their music, and their refusal to take sides and non-partisan stances helped them appeal to all of Lebanon, which then allowed Fairuz to become a voice of reason and unification for the Lebanese people. This was especially important because the war itself was so multifaceted and involved many conflicting opinions between the state and different militias. To the Lebanese, she became a lot more than just an entertainer. She became a representation of Lebanon, as well as stability in a time of insecurity and uncertainty.

=== 1980s: A new production team ===
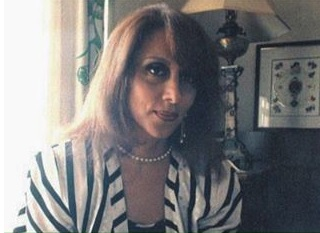
Fairuz at home, 1987

After the artistic divorce between Fairuz and the Rahbani brothers in 1979, Fairuz carried on with her son, composer Ziad Rahbani, his friend the lyricist Joseph Harb, and composer Philemon Wahbi. Ziad Rahbani was a constant driving force in the evolution of Fairuz's music style, as he worked to break away from what his parents had previously established. The songs he went on to compose for Fairuz would stray from the nostalgic nationalism that showcased the folkloric style Fairuz and the Rahbani brothers were known for; instead, he and Fairuz would go on to delve into a more modern sound in the form of jazz and funk.

Fairuz made a second and final European Television appearance on French TV on 13 October 1988, in a show called Du côté de chez Fred. Fairuz, who had scheduled a concert at the POPB of Paris Bercy concert hall three days later on 16 October, was the main guest of French TV presenter Frédéric Mitterrand. The programme features footage of her rehearsals for her concert at Bercy in addition to the ceremony featuring then French Minister of Culture Jack Lang awarding Fairuz the medal of Commandeur des Arts et des Lettres. It also includes a video montage of her previous movies and concerts. In that show, Fairuz also sang the three songs "Ya hourrié", "Yara" and "Zaali tawwal".

Her first CD, The Very Best of Fairuz, was published in 1987 and contained the emblematic song "Aatini al Nay wa ghanni" (Give me the flute and sing), based on a poem in "The Procession" by Khalil Gibran. It was first sung at the end of the sixties.

=== 1990s–present ===
In the 1990s, Fairuz produced six albums (two Philemon Wahbi tributes with unreleased tracks included, a Zaki Nassif album, three Ziad Rahbani albums, and a tribute album to Assi Rahbani orchestrated by Ziad) and held a number of large-scale concerts, most notably the historic concert held at Beirut's Martyr's Square in September 1994 to launch the rebirth of the downtown district that was ravaged by the civil war. She appeared at the Baalbeck International Festival in 1998 after 25 years of self-imposed absence where she performed the highlights of three very successful plays that were presented in the 1960s and 1970s.

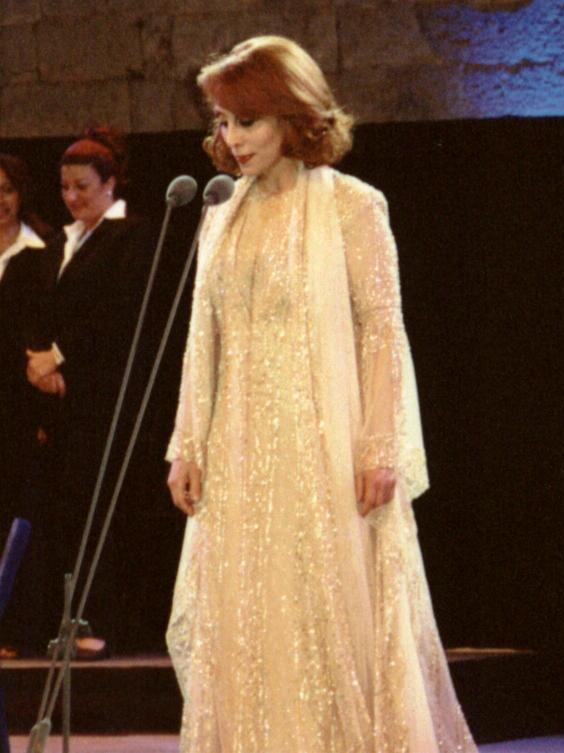
Fairuz performing in Beiteddine in 2001

She also performed a concert in Las Vegas at the MGM Grand Arena in 1999 which was attended by over 16,000 spectators, mostly Arabs. Ever since, Fairuz has held sold-out concerts at the Beiteddine International Festival (Lebanon) from 2000 to 2003, Kuwait (2001), Paris (2002), the United States (2003), Amman (2004), Montreal (2005), Dubai, Abu Dhabi, Baalbeck, BIEL (2006), Athens, Amman (2007), Damascus, and Bahrain (2008).

Her first album in the new millennium, Wala Keef, was released in 2002.

On 28 January 2008, Fairuz performed at the Damascus Opera House in an emotional return to the Syrian capital, where she played the lead role in the musical Sah el-Nom (Good Morning), after more than two decades of absence from the country, in one of a series of events highlighting UNESCO's designation of Damascus as the Capital of Arab Culture that year. Commenting on the event, the BBC wrote: "Every day the sun rises over Syria you hear one voice across the country—Fairuz, the legendary Lebanese singer and greatest living Arab diva". Syrian historian, Sami Moubayed, said that the Syrians were thrilled about the performance and that Fairuz reminded them of the "good old days". People from all ages attended the concert and the auditorium was packed with listeners. Fairuz said that she had never seen such an audience in her life. However, her decision to perform there drew criticism from Lebanese politicians who considered Syria to be a hostile nation.

Fairuz's new album entitled Eh... Fi Amal was released on 7 October 2010, produced by Fairuz productions and written entirely by her son Ziad Rahbani. Two concerts took place at BIEL Center in Beirut, Lebanon, on 7 and 8 October.

On 22 September 2017, Fairuz released her first album in seven years, titled Bebalee and produced by her daughter Rima Rahbani. On 21 June, Fairuz released the first single from the album, "Lameen", in commemoration of her late husband Assi Rahbani. It was inspired by the French song "Pour qui veille l'étoile" and was adapted into Arabic by Rima Rahbani.

On 31 August 2020, French president Emmanuel Macron visited Fairuz in her house during his trip to Lebanon after the Beirut explosion.

Fairuz made a rare public appearance in July 2025, on the occasion of the passing of her son, Ziad Rahbani, to attend his funeral.

== Controversies ==
=== 2008 Damascus concert ===
The 2008 concert in Damascus angered some of her fans and several Lebanese politicians who described Syria as "enemy territory in the grip of a brutal secret police force". Walid Jumblatt, leader of the Druze Progressive Socialist Party, accused Fairuz of "playing into the hands of Syrian intelligence services", while fellow party member Akram Chehayeb said that "those who love Lebanon do not sing for its jailers", in reference to the three-decades-long Syrian occupation of Lebanon. Even some Syrian opposition activists called on her to boycott the event as just three years prior Syria had been accused of carrying out a series of assassinations on the Lebanese. This came amid a political crisis in Lebanon between pro- and anti-Syria factions. As well as a renewed Syrian government crackdown on dissent that same day during which several people were arrested, including opposition figure Riad Seif and twelve other activists of the anti-government Damascus Declaration.

A poll conducted a week before the concert by NOW Lebanon, a Lebanese web portal sympathetic to the anti-Syria March 14 Alliance, showed that 67% of the respondents were opposed to Fairuz's appearance in Damascus, with one of the website's editorials saying that "this was not the moment for a musical love-in". Supporters of Fairuz counterclaimed that she has always been above politics. Fairuz refrained from commenting on the controversy. However, in a letter to the event's organisers, she said that the concert should be viewed from a cultural perspective, and wrote: "Damascus is not a cultural capital for this year only, but will remain a role model of art, culture and authenticity for the coming generations." She also told the head of the organisers that she felt it was a return to her second home. Syrian commentator Ayman Abdelnour said that Fairuz was performing to the Syrian people, not their rulers. Her brother-in-law and her former partner Mansour Rahbani also defended her decision to perform there, saying it was "a message of love and peace from Lebanon to Syria".

In 1969, Fairuz's songs were banned from radio stations in Lebanon for six months because she refused to sing at a private concert in honour of Algerian president Houari Boumedienne. The incident only served to increase her popularity. Fairuz said that while always willing to sing to the public and to various countries and regions, she would never sing to any individual.

=== Madonna sampling ===
In 1992, Madonna sampled some parts of Fairuz's "Al Yawm Oullika Aala Khashaba" (اليوم عُلّق على خشبة, "Today He Was Hung on a Cross") in her song "Erotica" without permission; the singers settled the matter outside of court, but Madonna's album and single were prohibited in Lebanon.

=== Lawsuits ===
Since many of the Rahbanis' works were co-written by Assi's brother Mansour, in June 2010, a year after Mansour's death in January 2009, a Lebanese court banned Fairuz from singing material that involved his contributions. The issue began when Mansour's children filed a lawsuit against Fairuz when she was set to perform the song "Ya'ish Ya'ish" at the Casino du Liban. As a result, Fairuz could not perform such works without Mansour's children's permission. The court's decision led to protests around the world in response to what her fans perceived as an act of "silencing". Hundreds gathered in front of the National Museum of Beirut, led by a number of Arab artists, including Egyptian actress Ilham Chahine who flew to Lebanon in order to join the sit-in. "She is a great artistic personality who has entertained millions for decades. We cannot keep silent over this humiliating attitude to her and to art and artists in general. Fairuz to me is above all laws. She is like the mother whom, even when she errs, we are eager to forgive," Chahine added. Ian Black wrote on The Guardian: "Outrage over her silencing has been a reminder of the extraordinary loyalty she still inspires across the region". Other reactions included a protest concert in Egypt, and a "Shame!" headline displayed by Emirati newspaper Al-Ittihad.

=== Alleged political affiliations ===
Fairuz's son, Ziad Rahbani, sparked controversy in December 2013 during an interview with the Al-Ahed website when asked whether his mother shared his supportive stance on the political vision of Hassan Nasrallah, the leader of Hezbollah, a dominant but highly controversial political and military force in Lebanon. Ziad replied: "Fairuz is very fond of Sayyed Hassan [Nasrallah], although she will be displeased with me, as she was after my last television interview when I revealed some personal information and she quickly interrupted me." There were strong reactions to this statement, which went viral on social media, and the country's different media outlets did not deviate from their political stances when reacting to Ziad's words. Politicians and celebrities stepped in as well, some of whom objected to affiliating Fairuz to one side of Lebanon's political divide over another, including Druze leader Walid Jumblatt who said: "Fairuz is too great to be criticised, and at the same time too great to be classified as belonging to this or that political camp." He added, "Let us keep her in her supreme position, and not push her to something she has nothing to do with." Ziad, who claims to speak on his mother's behalf "because she prefers to remain silent," responded to his critics by saying: "Apparently it isn't allowed in the age of strife for the princess of classy Arab art to voice love for the master of resistance." Nasrallah, commenting on the issue during a speech, stated: "An educated highly respected thinker and artist, who may have espoused different ideologies, might disagree with you on political matters, but personally have [a] fondness for you, because of your character, conduct, sacrifices and so on. If such a person were to say that he or she liked someone, then all hell would break loose."

== Public image ==
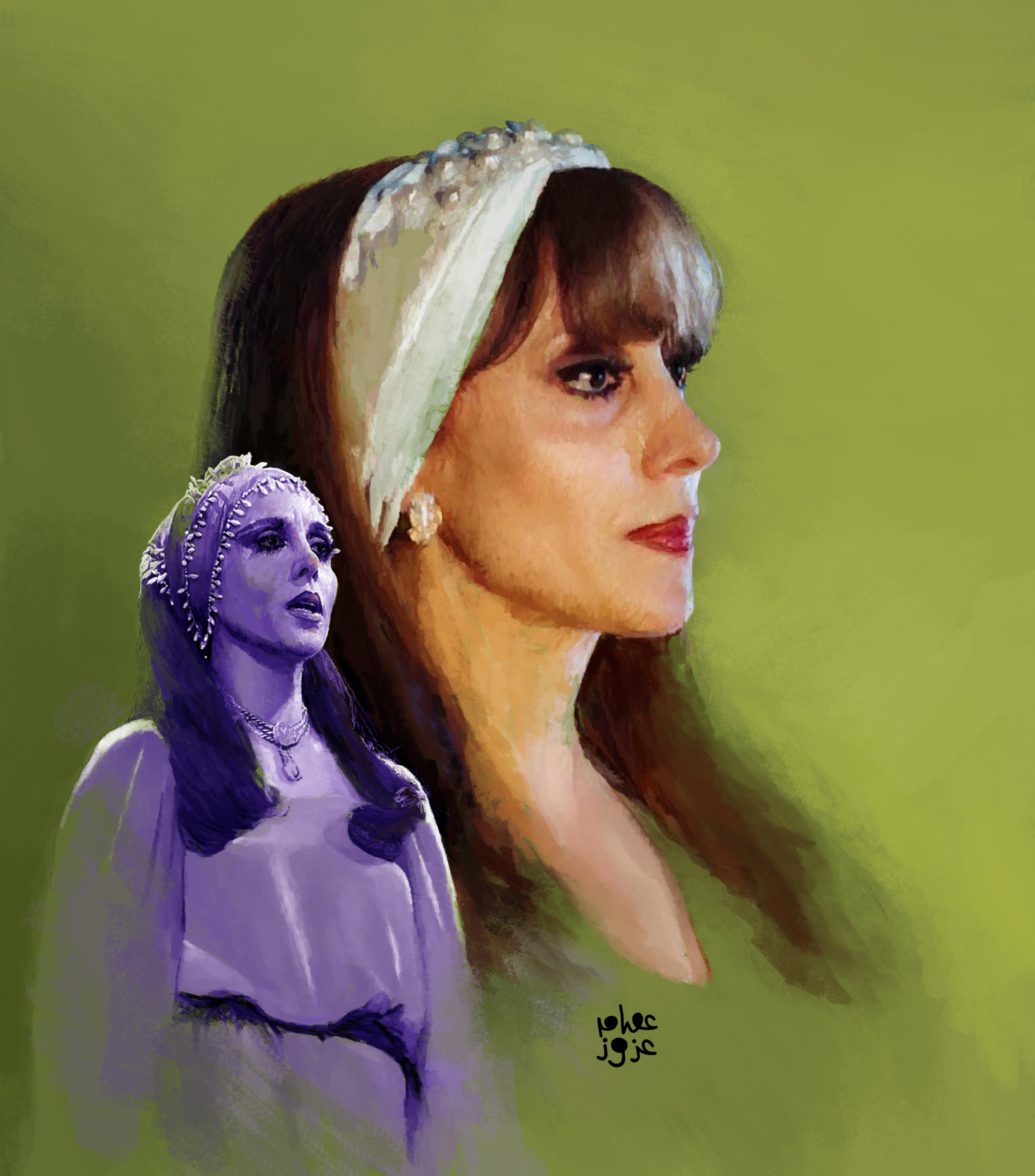
Portrait of Fairuz by Essam Azouz

Beyond speculations on her political sympathies, it has also been noted that, on the contrary, Fairuz has represented a symbol of national unity and identity during the Civil War, having refused to publicly take sides with any of the parties involved, and having focused her musical work on the collective grief experienced by the Lebanese. Some of her songs of those years, including "Li Beirut" (لبيروت) and "Bahebak Ya Lebnan" (بحبك يا لبنان, "I love you Lebanon"), have thus been described as a source of hope and comfort for her people across the political spectrum. For decades, most radio stations in the Arab world have started their morning broadcast with a Fairuz song, and her songs were wildly popular during the Civil War, as the people expected to hear a patriotic melody of peace and love.

The Guardian and scholar Christopher Stone have argued that Fairuz has played a crucial role in shaping the national identity of post-independence Lebanon. In 1997, Billboard stated "even after five decades at the top, [Fairuz] remains the supreme Diva of Lebanon". In 1999, The New York Times described her as "a living icon without equal" and stated that her emergence as a singer paralleled Lebanon's transformation from a backwater to the vibrant financial and cultural heart of the Arab world. In a 2008 article, the BBC described Fairuz as "the legendary Lebanese singer and greatest living Arab diva". In an article about world music, The Independent stated, "All young female singers in this region seem to be clones of her" and that "she's such an important artist that you have to get to grips with her".

The 2026 Lebanon war has led to more complex reactions to Fairuz's work, particularly "Bahebak Ya Lebnan", which in some quarters has served as the country's de facto national anthem. Academic Nour El Rayes has suggested there is a generational divide between those old enough to remember to recall Lebanon's past, and younger listeners who have experienced years of conflict and have less positive views of the song's patriotic sentiments.

=== Performances and persona ===
Fairuz has performed in many countries around the globe including Syria, Jordan, Iraq, Kuwait, United Arab Emirates, Qatar, Bahrain, Egypt, Tunisia, Algeria, Morocco, France, United Kingdom, Switzerland, Netherlands, Greece, Canada, United States, Mexico, Brazil, Argentina, Australia, Belgium, Italy, and her home country Lebanon.

During her performances, Fairuz is known to take on a very rigid and cold stance, due to her stage fright. She claims that the hieratic nature of her performances is because she is singing as if she were praying. She is also described as being incredibly reserved and modest in the way a mother would be, and embodies the Lebanese woman at home.

== Personal life ==
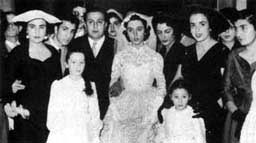
Fairuz and Assi Rahbani surrounded by members of their families on their wedding day in 1955

Very little is known about Fairuz's personal life and affairs, as she is described as having a hermetic nature and separates her private life as Nouhad from her public persona of Fairuz.

Born to a Syriac Orthodox and Maronite Christian family, Fairuz converted to Greek Orthodoxy when she married Assi Rahbani (1923–1986), one of the Rahbani brothers who helped shape her singing career, on 23 January 1955. The ceremony took place at the Greek-Orthodox Annunciation Church of Beirut. The couple had four children: Ziad (1956–2025), a composer, playwright and pianist; Hali (1958–2026, paralysed since early childhood after meningitis); Layal (born 1960, died in 1988 of a stroke), also a composer; and Rima (born 1965), a photographer and film director. Fairuz has a younger sister, Hoda Haddad, who has worked as a singer and actress.

=== Rahbani family tree ===
Rahbani family
  - Assi (1923–1986) + Fairuz (born 1934 or 1935)
    - Ziad (1956–2025)
    - Hali (1958–2026)
    - Layal (1960–1988)
    - Rima (born 1965)
  - Mansour (1925–2009) + Thereze
    - Marwan (born 1958)
    - Ghadi (born 1960)
    - Oussama (born 1965)
  - Elias (1938–2021) + Nina
    - Ghassan (born 1964)
    - Jad (born 1968)
    - Ilham

== Theatrical works ==
Most of the works of the Rahbani trio (Fairuz, Assi, and Mansour) consisted of musical plays or operettas. The Rahbani brothers produced 25 popular musical plays (20 with Fairuz) over more than 30 years, and are credited as having been one of—if not the very first—to produce world-class Arabic musical theatre.

The musicals combined storyline, lyrics and dialogue, musical composition varying widely from Lebanese folkloric and rhythmic modes to classical, westernised, and oriental songs, orchestration, and the voice and acting of Fairuz. She played the lead roles alongside singers/actors Nasri Shamseddine, Wadih El Safi, Antoine Kerbaje, Elie Shouayri (Chouayri), Hoda Haddad (Fairuz's younger sister), William Haswani, Raja Badr, Siham Chammas (Shammas), Georgette Sayegh, and many others.

The Rahbani plays expressed patriotism, unrequited love and nostalgia for village life, comedy, drama, philosophy, and contemporary politics. The songs performed by Fairuz as part of the plays have become immensely popular among the Lebanese and Arabs around the world.

The Fairuz-Rahbani collaboration produced the following musicals (in chronological order):

- Ayyam al Hassad (Days of Harvest – 1957)
- Al 'Urs fi l’Qarya (The Wedding in the Village – 1959)
- Al Ba'albakiya (The Girl from Baalbek) – 1961)
- Jisr el Amar (Bridge of the Moon – 1962)
- Awdet el 'Askar (The Return of the Soldiers – 1962)
- Al Layl wal Qandil (The Night and the Lantern – 1963)
- Biyya'el Khawatem (Ring Salesman – 1964)
- Ayyam Fakhreddine (The Days of Fakhreddine – 1966)
- Hala wal Malik (Hala and the King – 1967)
- Ach Chakhs (The Person – 1968–1969)
- Jibal Al Sawwan (Sawwan Mountains – 1969)
- Ya'ich Ya'ich (Long Live, Long Live – 1970)
- Sah Ennawm (Did you sleep well? – 1970–1971 – 2006–2008)
- Nass min Wara' (People Made out of Paper – 1971–1972)
- Natourit al Mafatih (The Guardian of the Keys – 1972)
- Al Mahatta (The Station – 1973)
- Loulou – 1974
- Mais el Reem (The Deer's Meadow – 1975)
- Petra – 1977–1978

Most of the musical plays were recorded and video-taped. Eighteen of them have been officially released on audio CD, two on DVD (Mais el Reem and Loulou). An unauthorised version of Petra and one such live version of Mais el Reem in black and white exist. Ayyam al Hassad (Days of Harvest) was never recorded and Al 'Urs fi l’Qarya (The Marriage in the Village) has not yet been released (yet an unofficial audio record is available).

== Honours and awards ==
Fairuz has received multiple awards and tokens of recognition throughout her career, including the Key to the Holy City (by the Jerusalem Cultural Committee in 1973), the Jordanian Medal of Honor (by King Hussein in 1975), the Jerusalem Award (by the Palestinian Authority) and the Highest Artistic Distinction (by Tunisian president Zine El Abidine Ben Ali in 1998), as well as being nominated Knight of the National Order of the Cedar, Commander of Arts and Letters (by French president François Mitterrand in 1988) and Knight of the Legion of Honour (by French president Jacques Chirac in 1998).

== Filmography ==
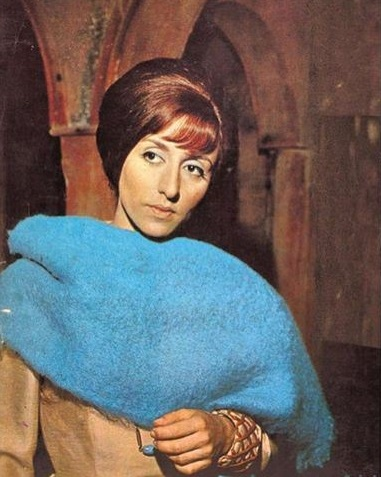
Fairuz in Biya' Al Khawatem (1964)

=== Cinema ===
Film performances
Year	Title (English translation)	Role	Ref.
1964	Biya' Al Khawatem (The Rings Salesman)	Rima	
1967	Safar Barlik (Mobilisation)	Adla	
1968	Bint Al Haress (The Guard's Daughter)	Najma	

=== Television ===
Lebanese Television has featured appearances by Fairuz in the following television programmes:

- Al Iswara (The Bracelet)
- Day'it El Aghani (Village of Songs)
- Layali As'Saad (Nights of Happiness)
- Al Quds fil Bal (Jerusalem in my Mind)
- Dafater El Layl (Night Memoirs)
- Maa Al Hikayat (With Stories)
- Sahret Hobb (Romantic Evening)
- Qasidat Hobb (A Love Poem), also presented as a musical show in Baalbeck in 1973

== Discography ==
Fairuz possesses a relatively large musical repertoire. Though sources disagree on the exact number, she is generally credited with between fifteen hundred and three thousand songs.

Around 85 Fairuz CDs, various vinyl formats, and cassettes have been officially released. Most of the songs that are featured on these albums were composed by the Rahbani brothers. Also featured are songs by Philemon Wehbe, Ziad Rahbani, Zaki Nassif, Mohamed Abd El Wahab, Najib Hankash, and Mohamed Mohsen.

Many of Fairuz's numerous unreleased works date back to the 1950s and 1960s, and were composed by the Rahbani brothers (certain unreleased songs, the oldest of all, are by Halim el Roumi). A Fairuz album composed by Egyptian musician Riad Al Sunbati (who has worked with Umm Kulthum) was produced in 1980 but is unlikely to be released. There are also fifteen unreleased songs composed by Philemon Wehbe and 24 unreleased songs composed by Ziad Rahbani in the 1980s.

Fairuz has also released a live album on Folkways Records in 1994, entitled Lebanon: The Baalbek Folk Festival.

== In popular culture ==
The character in Yasmine El Rashidi's novel Chronicle of a Last Summer listens to Fairuz's song "Shat Iskandaria", a song about love and longing for the coastal city of Alexandria that is noted for its melodic style influenced by Balkan folk music.

== See also ==
- Rahbani brothers
- Wadih El Safi
- Zahrat al-Mada'en
- Ziad Rahbani
- Julia Boutros
