= Halim el-Roumi =

Halim el-Roumi حليم الرومي
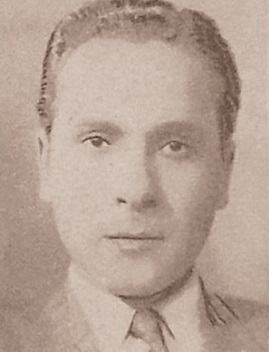
- Halim in his early years.

Background information
- Born: Halim el-Roumi; July 1919; Lebanon
- Origin: Lebanese
- Died: 1 November 1983 (aged 64) Beirut, Lebanon
- Genres: Arabic, classical
- Occupations: composer and singer
- Instrument: Vocals
- Years active: Early 1950s – 1970s

Halim el-Roumi (Arabic: حليم الرومي) (July 1919 – 1983) was a Lebanese singer and composer.

Born in Tyre, Lebanon to Lebanese parents, he began his amateur artistic career in 1935, when he was in Haifa, Palestine. Later, as a radio chief first in Haifa and then in Lebanon, he discovered the singer Fairuz. He composed her music, introduced her to the choir of Radio Liban and was the originator of her stage name. El-Roumi also became director of Radio libanaise.

He is famous for composing the poem La Volonté de vivre (إرادة الحياة) by the Tunisian poet Aboul-Qacem Echebbi for the Arab singer Souad Mohamed. He is the father of Majida Al Roumi, Mona Al Roumi, Awad Al Roumi and Maha Al Roumi.

== Life ==
Al Roumi was born in 1915, in Tyre, South Lebanon. His family moved to Haifa, Palestine when he was two years old. He joined the Music Academy of Haifa and participated in festivals and concerts that would take place there.

In the early 1940s, he began working in the Near East Broadcasting Station in Jafa as a singer, composer, and musician. He was promoted to Head of the musical section of the radio station. In July 1949, he married Mary Lotfy, an Egyptian woman. He had four children: Maha, Mona, Majida, and Awadh.

== Work with Fairuz ==
It was Al Roumi who discovered Fairuz, and introduced her to Assy El Rahbani, her future husband and one of the Rahbani brothers. He is credited with having given Fairuz, née Nohad Haddad, her stage name.
