= Mansour Rahbani =

Lebanese composer

Mansour Rahbani منصور الرحباني
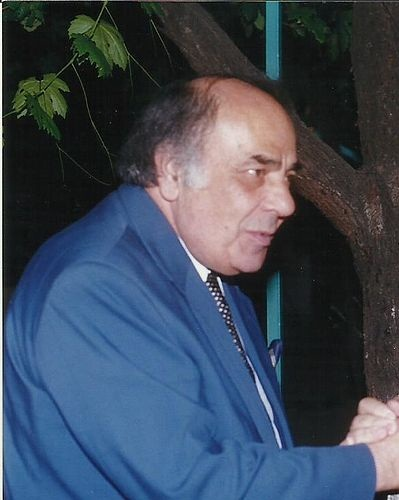
- Born: 17 March 1925; Antelias, Lebanon
- Died: 13 January 2009 (aged 83); Beirut, Lebanon
- Occupations: Composer, poet, writer, producer, musician
- Children: Oussama Rahbani (son)
- Relatives: Assi Rahbani (brother); Elias Rahbani (brother); Fairuz (sister-in-law); Ziad Rahbani (nephew); Ghassan Rahbani (nephew)

Mansour Rahbani (Arabic: منصور الرحباني, romanized: Manṣūr al-Raḥbānī; 17 March 1925 – 13 January 2009) was a Lebanese composer, musician, poet, philosopher, thinker, and producer, known as one of the Rahbani brothers, and the brother-in-law of the singer Fairuz.

== Career ==
During his musical education he collaborated with his brother Assi in creating the Rahbani brothers. They took their new artistic direction to the Lebanese Radio in 1945. The delivery of a “Rahbanian” song was not an easy task; however, it had faced up to the strong current of the traditional song and heritage, which dominated the entirety of the Eastern World since the beginning of the twentieth century, through Salama Hegazi and Abdou El-Hamouli.

The two brothers went on to join the ranks of the Near East Radio, where they composed many artistic works as well as a series of sketches entitled “Sabeh and Makhoul”. When Assi married Nouhad Haddad (also known as Fairuz) in 1955, the two brothers formed a new Rahbani trio with her. They composed poems and songs, which Fairuz would sing with great prowess.

=== Poetry ===
Mansour wrote four Diwans in his life as a poet:

1. Al-Quṣur Al-Mai'yyah, القصور المائية (The Aquatic Castles)
2. Ana Al-Ġareeb Al-Aḫar, أنا الغريب الأخر (I am the Other Stranger)
3. Baḥar Al-shete, بحار الشتي (The Winter's Sailor)

== Theatre ==
The Rahbani singing theatre is considered as a unique form, which differs somewhat from the international standard for operas. It focuses on the values of dignity, truth, gracefulness, and the depth of its philosophical subjects in order to concentrate on the three main subjects of God, the Human Being, and the Land.

The Rahbani Brothers also extended their activities to the world of cinema, and composed the music for three illustrious films: Biyaa el Khawatem (The Ring Seller), Safar Barlek (Exile), and Bent el Hares (The Guardian's Daughter).

== Death ==
Rahbani was admitted to the Hôtel-Dieu de France hospital in Beirut, Lebanon, following a severe pneumonia. He spent three days in intensive care before dying on 13 January 2009, at the age of 83.

== See also ==
Rahbani family
  - Assi (1923–1986) + Fairuz (born 1934 or 1935)
    - Ziad (1956–2025)
    - Hali (1958–2026)
    - Layal (1960–1988)
    - Rima (born 1965)
  - Mansour (1925–2009) + Thereze
    - Marwan (born 1958)
    - Ghadi (born 1960)
    - Oussama (born 1965)
  - Elias (1938–2021) + Nina
    - Ghassan (born 1964)
    - Jad (born 1968)
    - Ilham
