= Assi Rahbani =

Lebanese composer, musician, and producer (1923–1986)

Assi Rahbani عاصي الرحباني
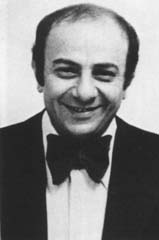

Background information
- Born: 4 May 1923; Antelias, Lebanon
- Died: 21 June 1986 (aged 63) Beirut, Lebanon
- Years active: 1951–1986
- Spouse: Fairuz (m. 1955)
- Children: 4, including Ziad
- Relatives: Mansour Rahbani (brother); Elias Rahbani (brother); Hoda Haddad (sister-in-law) others

Assi Rahbani (Arabic: عاصي الرحباني; 4 May 1923 – 21 June 1986) was a Lebanese composer, musician, conductor, and producer. He was part of the Rahbani Brothers (Arabic: الأخوان رحباني), with his brother Mansour Rahbani. He married Lebanese singer Nouhad Haddad, more famous by her stage name, Fairuz. Their son Ziad Rahbani was also an artist in music, theatre, and a political activist.

== Career ==
=== The early years ===
Assi Rahbani's musical career began when he obtained a job at the Near East Radio channel (إذاعة الشرق الأدنى). In 1951, Nouhad Haddad (later known as Fairuz), one of the singers in the radio station's chorus, came to the attention of Halim El Roumi, the musical director. Assi composed her very first song, "Itab" ("Reproach"). El Roumi attended the recording session and asked Assi to compose additional songs for her. The trio released about 50 songs for the station. In 1956, during the Suez Crisis, the Rahbani brothers, along with Fairuz, left the Near East Radio Station due to its alleged bias and anti-Arab propaganda in its coverage of the Crisis. The Rahbani Brothers and Fairuz became an independent musical group. Both of the Rahbani Brothers composed and both of them wrote lyrics as they always clarified in interviews and as attested by their family members as well as by artists who collaborated and worked with them. In 1957, the trio performed for the first time at the Baalbeck International Festival.

=== Lebanese Civil War ===
After the Lebanese Civil War erupted, the Rahbanis continued to use political satire and sharp criticism in their plays. In 1977, their musical Petra was shown in both the Muslim western and Christian eastern portions of Beirut. In 1978, the trio toured Europe and the Persian Gulf nations.

== Personal life and health ==
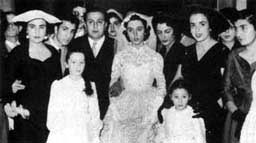
Rahbani and Fairuz on their wedding day

Aside from Rahbani's professional relationship with Fairuz, the two were also married for a quarter of a century. In 1953, Rahbani proposed to Fairuz and the couple married a year later. On 26 September 1972, Rahbani suffered a brain hemorrhage and was hospitalized at Rizk Hospital in Beirut, Lebanon. After three surgeries, the hemorrhage was halted.

By the late 1970s, Rahbani's mental health had begun to deteriorate. Fairuz and the Rahbani Brothers agreed to end their professional and personal relationship in 1979, which also included Fairuz separating from Assi Rahbani.

=== Family tree ===
Rahbani family
  - Assi (1923–1986) + Fairuz (born 1934 or 1935)
    - Ziad (1956–2025)
    - Hali (1958–2026)
    - Layal (1960–1988)
    - Rima (born 1965)
  - Mansour (1925–2009) + Thereze
    - Marwan (born 1958)
    - Ghadi (born 1960)
    - Oussama (born 1965)
  - Elias (1938–2021) + Nina
    - Ghassan (born 1964)
    - Jad (born 1968)
    - Ilham
