= Rahbani brothers =

Lebanese sibling musicians

Assi Rahbani	Mansour Rahbani

Assi Rahbani (4 May 1923 – 21 June 1986) and Mansour Rahbani (17 March 1925 – 13 January 2009), known as the Rahbani brothers (Arabic: الأخوان رحباني, romanized: al-ʾAkhawān Raḥbānī), were Lebanese sibling musicians, composers, songwriters, authors, and playwrights/dramatists, best known for their work with the singer Fairuz, Assi's wife. Their younger brother Elias Rahbani (26 June 1938 – 4 January 2021) was also a notable lyricist and composer.

== Family tree ==
Rahbani family
  - Assi (1923–1986) + Fairuz (born 1934 or 1935)
    - Ziad (1956–2025)
    - Hali (1958–2026)
    - Layal (1960–1988)
    - Rima (born 1965)
  - Mansour (1925–2009) + Thereze
    - Marwan (born 1958)
    - Ghadi (born 1960)
    - Oussama (born 1965)
  - Elias (1938–2021) + Nina
    - Ghassan (born 1964)
    - Jad (born 1968)
    - Ilham

== History ==
=== Early career ===
Coming originally from Rahbeh, a small town in the north of Lebanon, the Rahbani Brothers were not involved in music aside from the reading that their parents made sure they had. Though Assi and Mansour occasionally helped the local priest in arranging the vocals and instrumentation of their Antiochian Orthodox liturgies, their musical career began when Assi obtained a job at the Near East Radio channel.

While working as police officers in Beirut, Mansour and Assi started at the radio channel as paperboys, dealing with the music sheets and lyrical editing. They eventually composed their own jingle and suggested it to the supervisor at the channel, Halim El Roumi, the father of singer Majida El Roumi. He encouraged them by paying them for their work and broadcasting it on the channel airwaves.

In 1951, Nouhad Haddad (later known as Fairuz), one of the singers in the channel's chorus, came to the attention of Halim El Roumi. Assi composed her first song, "Itab" ("Blame").

Halim el-Roumi attended the recording session and asked Assi to compose additional songs for her. Assi and Mansour Rahbani and Fairuz soon became one of the most prominent groups on the Lebanese music scene. The trio released about 50 songs in the following three years and found it more convenient to split from the channel and work on their own without the employment restrictions. The Rahbani Brothers and Fairuz became a musical team. Both of the Rahbani Brothers composed and both of them wrote lyrics as they always clarified in interviews and as attested by their family members as well as by artists who collaborated and worked with them.

In 1953, Assi proposed to Fairuz and the couple was married in 1954.

In 1957, the trio performed for the first time at the Baalbeck International Festival; it was the first time that local Lebanese artists had appeared in the festival.

=== The 1960s ===
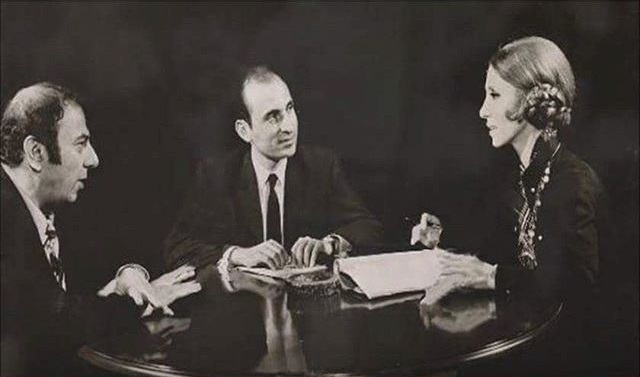
Adel Malek, Fairuz and Assi Rahbani in 1963

Fairuz and the Rahbani Bros started building their career based on the songs they recorded and released. Radio and TV became the primary media through which their music spread. Assi and Mansour also began writing musicals, plays with musical dialogs, and interpretations of patriotic themes that appealed to the Lebanese public. The musicals mostly focused on village life, the innocence of growing up, the problems of love, parental care, and the mischief of youth.

=== The 1970s ===
The Rahbani Brothers also launched the careers of artists who first worked as backup singers for Fairuz or acted in their musicals; many of them became forces in the Arab music industry. Georgette Sayegh, Najat Al Saghira, Sabah, Wadih El Safi, Ronza, Fadia Tanb El-Hage, and Huda, Fairuz's younger sister were the most prominent of the Rahbani Brothers' proteges.

Fairuz, Assi, and Mansour were introduced to the Western world during their 1971 tour of the United States. Initially, managers and event-organizers in the US doubted the popularity and drawing power of Fairuz and the Rahbani Brothers. However, after a concert of June 6, 1971 at Carnegie Hall, Fairuz proved that she could be a viable artist abroad. After four months of touring the US, Canada, and Mexico, the trio returned to Beirut where Assi and Mansour started working on the musical Al Mahatta (The Station), and a TV show called Al Mawasem (Seasons), starring Huda.

On September 22, 1972 Assi suffered a brain hemorrhage and was rushed to the hospital. After three surgeries, Assi's brain hemorrhage was halted. Ziad Rahbani, the eldest son of Fairuz and Assi, at age 16, composed music for the song Saaloui n'Nass (The People Asked Me), which pays homage to Assi and talks about his absence and the song was included in the musical Al Mahatta (المحطة), which was being prepped at the time.

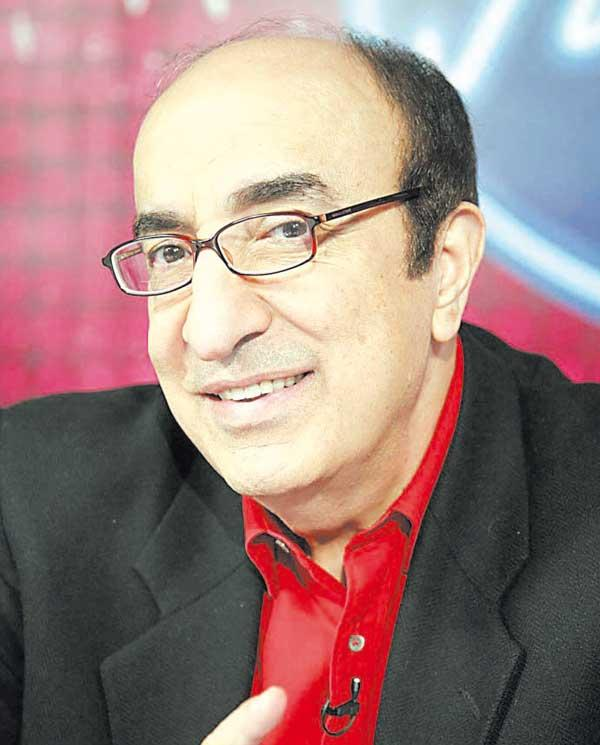
Elias Rahbani

Within a year, Assi had returned to composing and writing with his brother. They continued to produce musicals, which became increasingly political in nature. After the Lebanese Civil War erupted, the brothers continued to use political satire and sharp criticism in their plays.

In 1978, the trio toured Europe and the Gulf nations. Assi's medical and mental health began to deteriorate. Fairuz and the brothers agreed to end their professional and personal relationship in 1979.

=== The 1980s ===
Assi and Mansour Rahbani continued to compose musicals for Ronza and Fadia Tanb El-Hage (Ronza's sister). They re-made their musical Al Sha'khs (The Person) which they had first performed with Fairuz in the early-1970s.

On June 26, 1986 Assi Rahbani died after spending several weeks in a coma.

=== The 1990s ===
In the summer of 1998, Fairouz, Mansour Rahbani, Elias Rahbani, and Ziad Rahbani re-staged a number of their old musicals at the Baalbeck International Festival.

== Critical interpretation – links to critical articles ==
A dearth of artistic-literary criticism exists on the works of the Rahbani Brothers, Ziad Rahbani, and Fairouz. One of the main reasons being their works are seen from a Nationalistic point of view. Proper literary criticism remains to be created most probably in later years. However, one of the most important literary interpretations are found in Nizar Mroueh's "In Lebanese Arabic Music and the Rahbani Musical Theatre".

Articles with a critical interpretation:

In Arabic:

== Works ==
=== Musical plays ===
- Ayyam al Hassaad (Days of Harvest – 1957)
- Al 'Urs fi l'Qarya (The Wedding in the Village – 1959)
- Al Ba'albakiya (The Girl from Baalbek – 1961)
- Jisr el Amar (Bridge of the Moon – 1962)
- 'Awdet el 'Askar (The Return of the Soldiers – 1962)
- Al Layl wal Qandil (The Night and the Lantern – 1963)
- Biyya'el Khawatem (Rings for Sale – 1964)
- Ayyam Fakhreddine (The Days of Fakhreddine – 1966)
- Hala wal Malik (Hala and the King – 1967)
- Ach Chakhs (The Person – 1968–1969)
- Jibal Al Sawwan (Sawwan Mountains – 1969)
- Ya'ich Ya'ich (Long Live, Long Live – 1970)
- Sah Ennawm (Did you sleep well? – 1970–1971 – 2007–2008)
- Nass min Wara' (People Made out of Paper – 1971–1972)
- Natourit al Mafatih (The Guardian of the Keys – 1972)
- Al Mahatta (The Station – 1973)
- Loulou – 1974
- Mais el Reem (The Deer's Meadow – 1975)
- Petra – 1977–1978
- Elissa – 1979 (Never performed due to the separation of Fairuz and Assi)
- Habayeb Zaman – 1979 (Never performed due to the separation of Fairuz and Assi)
- Ar-rabih Assabeh (the seventh spring – 1984)
- Al Faris (2016)

=== Films ===
- (1965) Biyya' el Khawatem (" The wedding Rings Seller" )
- (1967) Safar Barlek (The Exile)
- (1968) Bint El-Hares (The Guardian's Daughter)

== See also ==
- Assi Rahbani
- Mansour Rahbani
- Fairuz
- Ziad Rahbani
