= Amine Takieddine =

Lebanese writer, lawyer, journalist (1884-1937)

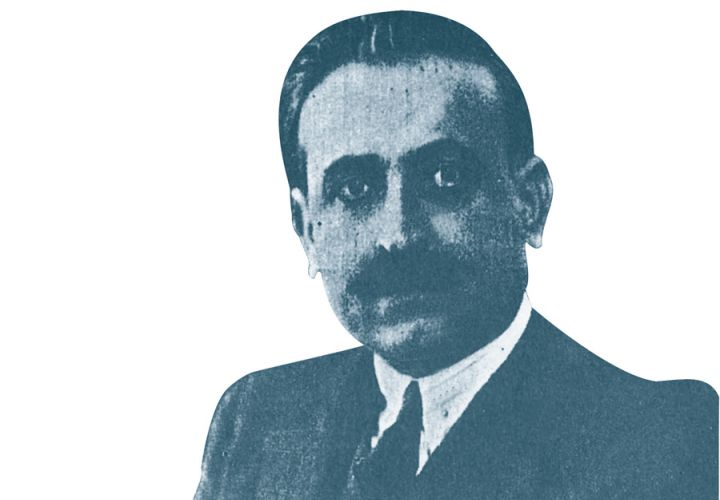
- Born: November 1884; Baakleen, Lebanon
- Died: 31 May 1937 (aged 52); Baakleen, Lebanon
- Occupations: Poet, lawyer, writer and political journalist

Amine bin Saeed bin Mahmoud bin Hussein Takieddine (Arabic: أمين سعيد محمد حسين تقي الدين), 7 November 1884 – 31 May 1937) was a Lebanese writer, poet, lawyer, and political journalist. Born in Baakleen in the Chouf District, Takieddine finished his studies in Beirut then travelled to Egypt and published Az-Zouhour magazine along with Anton Gemayel. He worked as a lawyer in Beirut up until his death from a cardiac arrest. He is famous for his published works in the fields of literature and law.

== Early life ==
Amine Takieddine was born on 7 November 1884, in the Lebanese village of Baakleen in the Chouf District, to a Druze family of Arabic descent. His father, Said Takieddine, served as the President of the Alumni Association at the American University of Beirut. His family was deeply rooted in different fields of literature, knowledge, and politics.

After Takieddine completed his first year of schooling in the village school, his father enrolled him at the age of seven in the Dawdye school, which was the first school built for the Druze in Aabey. He studied Arabic there for two years and studied under the linguistic author Ali Nasser Al-Dine.

In 1896, Takieddine moved to Sagesse High School in Beirut and finished his secondary school at the age of 15. At the Sagesse High school, the late Wadih Akel became his classmate, and Takieddine received his education from the Arabic grammar scholar Sheikh Abdullah Boustani.

Upon finishing his secondary school, Takieddine started studying English at the Syrian Protestant College, which is now known as the American University of Beirut. He studied there for two years.

He travelled to Istanbul, which was troubled by the Arab Renaissance movement; then he landed in Egypt, where he studied law and sat for his exams in Paris. Between 1910 and 1912, he assisted the late Anton Gemayel in publishing Az-Zouhour magazine, a platform for prominent contemporary poets and writers.

Before the outbreak of World War I, in 1913, Takieddine returned to Lebanon. Soon after he settled in his village, the military authorities summoned him; he was sentenced to death in absentia. Takieddine was secretly advised to hide away, as the commander of "Beiteddine" gendarmerie was on his way, flanked by soldiers, to bring him. Takieddine took off to a ranch owned by his parents in Baakleen's outskirts. There, he wrote articles, rhyming poetry, and translated a novel entitled "The Story of a Poor Young Man" from French to Arabic. Amine Takieddine later related how he eluded capture in an interview for a Lebanese magazine.

=== Marriage and children ===
In 1912, he returned from Egypt to Lebanon to marry Nabiha Abd al-Malik, the daughter of Sheikh Amin Abd al-Malik, who was the son of his uncle. He returned for the first time in 1909, when he got to know his relatives after a long absence, and among those he knew was Nabiha. Sheikh Abd al-Malik wanted his daughter to remain in Lebanon with her future husband, while Amine wanted to move with her to Cairo, where he worked. Thus, Amine returned to Egypt alone and began to secretly correspond with his fiancée through both his younger brother Fouad and Zafer Khalil Al-Mashaalani, who was a friend of Nabiha.

== Death and memorial ==
He died of cardiac arrest on 31 May 1937, in Beirut. A funeral was held for him in Baakleen, and his name was given to one of Beirut's streets in Tal al-Khayat.

On 10 January 1968, a memorial festival was held for him in the UNESCO Hall in Beirut, in which a group of poets and writers spoke about the 30th anniversary of his death.

== Career ==
After completing his studies in the Sagesse School, in 1905 he travelled to Egypt, where he stayed for 5 years, working initially as a journalist for Al Dhaher daily newspaper, owned by the lawyer Mohamad Abou Shadi. He later joined the Khedivial Law School and graduated with a BA degree from Dijon University in France, where he used to travel to attend classes at the end of each year.

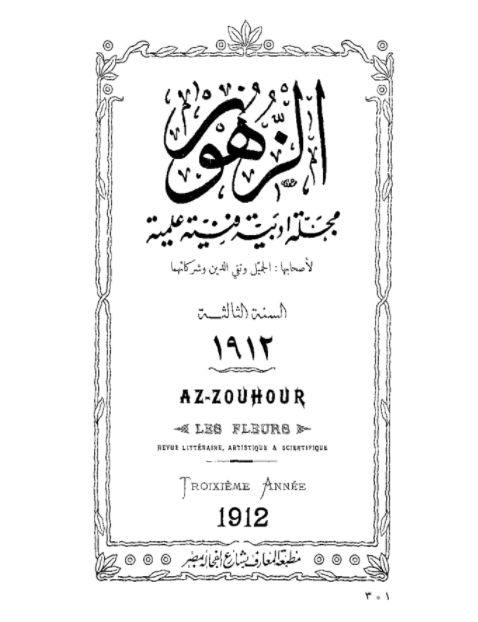
Al-Zohour 1912

His friend Anton Gemayel asked for his assistance in publishing Az-Zouhour magazine, and they became partners since the fourth issue of the magazine in June 1911. It ran up until December 1913, spearheading the Arab Renaissance movement at the time.

After the war ended and the French mandate was imposed on the country, the French authorities assigned him to supervise subsidies, and he was later appointed as member in the court that was established to look into the property sale/purchase transactions that took place during the war. He spent two years in that position.

Takieddine then moved to Beirut and worked in journalism. He started writing for Al Bayrak newspaper then for Al Barq newspaper. After that, he started his own law firm in 1919, alongside his friend Gabriel Nassar. His office in Beirut was turned into a "poetry club" for meeting up with poets and writers such as his friends Bechara El Khoury, Moussa Nammour, Michel Zakour, Wadih Akel, Elias Fayad, Adib Mazhar, and Elias Abou Chabke. Rumors claim that Abou Chabke used to visit Takieddine in his office to read his poetry to him and that Chabke was always met with attention and motivation.

He co-founded the "Lebanese Youth Association" in 1920. He also joined the "Arab Literature Association" and co-founded the "Literature Association," which was called for by Bechara El Khoury, alongside numerous scholars and writers with the aim of bringing together writers in Lebanon and the Arab world. The idea of this "Literature Association" originated from his friend Bechara El Khoury and aimed at bringing together authors of Lebanon and of the Arab world in one place. He co-founded the "Sagesse School Alumni Association," where he served as a vice-president. He was also a member of the Druze Community Council.

In 1921, he was the Secretary General of the Beirut Bar Association. On 26 October 1923, he was re-elected for another term. In 1925, the governor nominated him to be among a community that supervised the finance of Aabey's schools.

Takieddine ran for the parliamentary elections in the years 1925, 1927 and 1931, but was not elected. He also contributed to the establishment of several local political parties and was involved in some of them for a while, including the "Democratic Union Party," of which he served as a member, and the "Lebanese Front Party" alongside Youssef Al Sawda, Elias El Khoury and Elias Baaklini, where the party's objective was to call for the independence of Lebanon.

He was a member of the "Lebanese Scientific Society" which was established by a Presidential Decree issued by Charles Debbas on 31 February 1928. It only convened twice throughout its lifetime.

Among the critical cases that he handled in court was the case of murdering the Lebanese Director of Interior, Assad Khurshid. His literary legacy consisted of numerous books, including "Ethics of the Law Practice" and "Bloody Secrets" by Jean de Castaing.

== Literature and poetry ==
Takieddine was a writer of articles, prose and rhyming poetry. He had a relationship with Walieddine Yakan.

He was known for his book "Ethics of the Law Practice" (Arabic: Adab Almohamah أدب المحاماة) and his translation of "The Bloody Secrets" for Jules de Castine (Arabic: Alasrar Aldamya الأسرار الدامية ) from French to Arabic.

Egypt inspired and shaped the poetry of Sheikh Amine as he was directly exposed to both Egyptian and Lebanese writers staying in the Nile Valley. Among writers and poets he knew were Ahmad Chawki, Hafez Ibrahim, Waliyeddine Yakan, Ismail Sabri, Mahmoud Sami Al Baroudi, Daoud Barakat, Khalil Moutran, Salim Sarkis, Jurji Zaydan, Chibli Mallat, Chibli Chemayel, Imam Mohamad Al Abd, and other icons of poetry and literature.

His poetry was collected by his son, Wasim. It was later lost during the bloody events of Beirut and recollected recently by Najeeb Al-Baini. It was well-articulated, with carefully-chosen, elegant and truthful wording, reflecting his clemency, serenity, affability, and grandeur. His literature also includes his translation of the novel "The Story of a Poor Young Man" from French to Arabic.

== Bibliography ==
- مصادر الدراسات الأدبية/ يوسف اسعد داغر
- ديوان امين تقي الدين/ جمعه وحققه وقدم له سامي مكارم
