= Fuad Sami Haddad =

Lebanese neurosurgeon (1924– 2015)

Fuad Sami Haddad A.B.N.S., F.R.C.S. (C), F.A.C.S.
- فؤاد سامي حداد
- Born: March 31, 1924; Beirut, Lebanon
- Died: October 9, 2015 (aged 91); Beirut, Lebanon
- Education: American University of Beirut, Montreal Neurological Institute
- Occupations: Doctor, Neurosurgeon, Professor, Humanitarian

Fuad Sami Haddad (Arabic: فؤاد سامي حداد; March 31, 1924 – October 9, 2015) was a neurosurgeon, humanitarian, and writer. He was born in Beirut and spent most of his life in Lebanon.

== Personal life and education ==
Haddad was born in Beirut's Ain El Mraiseh neighborhood. He was raised between here and the Haouz Sa'atyeh (حوز سعتيه) neighborhood. His mother, Lamia Morcos (1896–1994) raised Haddad along with his five siblings. The son of Sami Ibrahim Haddad, a doctor and writer, Haddad's dreams did not fall far from the proverbial tree.

He attended primary school at the Collège Protestant Français from 1928 to 1935 and secondary school at the International College of Beirut. He received both his Bachelor of Arts in 1944 and his M.D. in 1948 from the American University of Beirut. Haddad subsequently completed his surgical residency at the Orient Hospital.

He then began his neurosurgery residency under Wilder Penfield at the Montreal Neurological Institute on July 1, 1950. There, he completed fellowships in neuropathology, neuro-anatomy, and electroencephalography. He returned to Lebanon in 1955 as "the first neurosurgeon certified by the American Board of Neurological Surgery to practice in the Middle East and... the entire Arab world."

In 1956, he married Aida Nasir, and together they raised six children of their own: Georges, Souheil, Fadi, Nabih, Labib, and Janane—two of whom are practicing neurosurgeons.

== Career ==
Upon his return to Lebanon, Haddad joined the faculty at the American University of Beirut and served the university until 2012. All the while, he kept a private practice where he "received patients from the Gulf States, Saudi Arabia, the Levant, North Africa, Turkey, and Iran."

The Lebanese Civil War began in 1975, making it difficult for American University of Beirut students to pursue a medical residency in the United States of America. Even before this era, Haddad saw a need and filled it with a neurosurgical residency program that remains successful to this day. Furthermore, on November 24, 1963, Haddad and his brother, Farid Haddad, were the founding members of the Lebanese Chapter of the American College of Surgeons. Both contributions to organized medicine in Lebanon marked great successes for practicing and future doctors who survived the war. Even during wartime, Haddad remained in Beirut as the only neurosurgeon serving the 450-bed American University Medical Center. "On a memorable spring weekend in 1976, he had to perform 13 craniotomies in a row for craniocerebral wounds. For 60 long hours he stood in the operating room mending the brain wounds of those unfortunate casualties."

Near the end of the war, Haddad was able to serve as a visiting professor in schools such as the University of Chicago, the University of Iowa, the Cleveland Clinic, the University at Albany, SUNY, and the University of Arkansas.

Haddad retired on February 1, 2012.

== 'Life under Fire' ==
In 1988, Haddad was invited to address the 38th Annual Meeting of the Congress of Neurological Surgeons on the state of neurosurgery in the Middle East.

Haddad explains the differences in disease, as tuberculosis ravaged much of Iran while it was far less prominent, and therefore a lower diagnostic priority, in the United States. Additionally, Haddad addresses differences in societal stability, since he had spent much of his career working under fire during the Lebanese Civil War. He notes how the absence of telephone communication and electricity (at times for two to three weeks) made surgeries and post-operative care exceptionally difficult.

Haddad then shares that there exist more Lebanese surgeons in São Paulo, Brazil than in Lebanon. Lastly, to defend his reasons for staying in Lebanon while healthcare providers fled, he leaves no room for doubt that his heart, and hands, are dedicated to the people of Lebanon. He finishes his address with a story and a firm commitment to the people of Lebanon:

A further example is that of a veiled woman who entered my empty office on one of the worse days of the fighting. I wondered what brought her to me when everybody else, including my own secretary, was looking for shelter from bombs and snipers. Said she, ‘Doctor, I know these are trying days and everything is scarce. I have baked a few loaves of bread and thought you and your family might do with some of them.’ Indeed we had gone without bread for 3 or 4 days, with a family of six children. She offered me three loaves and left. She had walked over 5 miles to bring this bread to me. As long as there are people like these in Lebanon, I will stay to serve them, no matter what the price is, and I am confident that, like the phoenix who rose from his ashes, Lebanon will and shall rise.

== Honors ==
- Holder of the Lebanese Golden Order of the Cedar – Commander (1988)
- Distinguished Service Award from the American University of Beirut Alumni Greater Baltimore Chapter (April 1998)
- Golden Medal of the Lebanese Order of Physicians (March 10, 1999)
- Distinguished Service Award from the Lebanese Order of Physicians (December 22, 2005)
- Distinguished Award from the Lebanese Boy Scout Association (February 12, 2006)
- Gold Medal from the Collège Protestant Français (May 19, 2006)
- Medal of the Pioneer, in recognition of leadership, achievement, and promotion of skull base surgery from the Asian-Oceanian Skull Base Surgery Society (October 2, 2006)
