= Philemon Wehbe =

Philemon Wehbe فيلمون وهبي
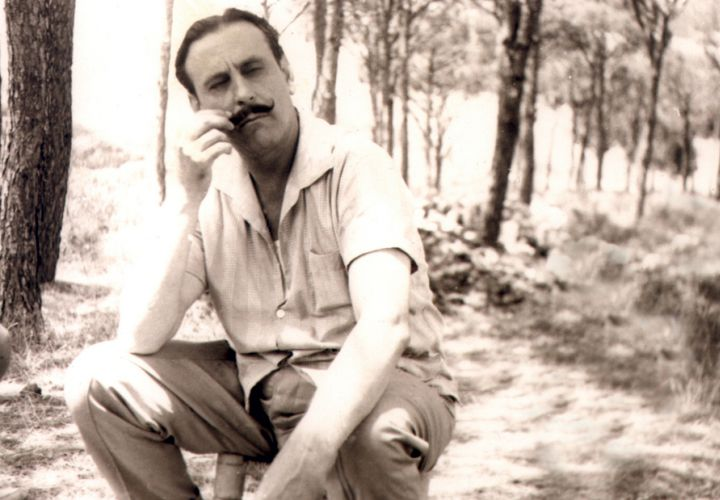
- Born: Philemon Bin Said Wehbe; 1918 Kfarshima, Lebanon
- Died: 5 November 1985, (67 years) Beirut, Lebanon
- Occupations: Singer, actor, musician, composer
- Years active: 1946-1985
- Spouse: Georgette Khoury
- Children: Imad, Saeed, Al-Hann y Rabie Wehbe

Philemon Wehbe (Arabic: فيلمون وهبي or Filemon Wehbe, 1918, Kfarshima - November 5, 1985, Beirut, Lebanon), was a prominent Lebanese musician, actor, comedian, singer and composer who in the mid-twentieth century created several musical works of Lebanese folklore for the singers of the time, such as: Sabah, Fairuz, Nasri Shamseddin, Melhem Barakat, Samira Tawfiq among many more. He is remembered for his artistic partnership with the Rahbani brothers, Assi Rahbani and Mansour Rahbani with whom he would create many of the operettas of the singer Fairuz.

== Early life and education ==
Philemon Bin Said Wehbe was born in 1918 in Kfarshima, Lebanon to Said Wehbe and Marie Ayoub. He was the son of a traditional family from his village of which his father was the mukhtar. During his childhood, he studied at the International School of Choueifat, where he used to attend with his oud to play in his free time. In his youth, Philemon was already showing musical talent, so he preferred to leave his studies and work instead, helping his family in order to focus on his passion for music.

== Career ==
His career began in Palestine, working at Al-Quds radio in Jerusalem in the year 1946. He was then hired by the radio station "Al-Sahrq Al'adnaa" (Arabic: إذاعة الشرق الأدنى) where he met and began his friendship with the artists and colleagues: Halim El Roumi, Nicola Al-Mani, Sami Al-Sidawi, Zaki Nassif, and the brothers, Assi Rahbani and Mansour Rahbani. The station "Al-Sahrq Al'adnaa" under the direction of Sabri Al Sharif in the year 1950 would become the official radio of Lebanon.

=== Work as a composer ===
Philemon Wahbe, was a self-taught musician and composer who was nourished mainly by Lebanese folk traditions. His musical works reflect the life in the mountains and villages of Lebanon, bringing his share of humor to the daily activities in them.

Folk songs, verses, mawal, zajal, and dabke are the most common forms where one can appreciate the work of Philemon Wahbe. Many of them were performed by the most famous Lebanese singers, such as: Sabah, Wadih Al Safi, Nasri Shamseddin, Najah Salam, Samira Tawfiq, Issam Rajji and Melhem Barakat. Philemon, for a short time lived in Egypt where he composed works for the singers: Warda Al-Jazairia, Sharifa Fadel and Fayza Ahmed.

A separate chapter is dedicated to his theatrical works alongside the Rahbani brothers and the singer Fairuz. His participation in them is considered the backbone of Lebanese musical theater.

=== End of career and legacy ===
Philemon Wahbe was the first composer to bring traditional Lebanese music to the entire Arab world, even reaching the exclusive Egyptian market, which in the 1950s, was difficult to access for non-local artists. He did so, through songs such as: "Dakhl Ayounik Hakina", "Aal Asfooriya" with Sabah, "Shab Asmar Janini", "Barhoum Hakini" with Najah Salam, "Bitrouhlak Mishwar" with singer Wadih Al Safi. His works also spread in Kuwait and the Persian Gulf region through the songs of "Gharid Al-Shati", by the singer Muhammad Al-Baqer, among many others.

Philemon Wehbe, was married to Georgette Khoury, with whom he had four children, Imad, Saeed, Al-Hann and Rabie. On November 5, 1985, Philemon Wehbe died at the age of 67 victim of a severe terminal illness. His songs continue to be part of the cultural heritage of Lebanon to this day.

== Musical work ==
Below are some of the works of Philemon Wehbe

- "Ya amy dulabini alhuaa" (Arabic:يا امي دولبني الهوى )
- "Eabdu eubayd" (Arabic:عبدو عبيد)
- "Ana khawfi min eatim allayl" (Arabic:أنا خوفي من عتم الليل )
- "Ealibisatat" (Arabic:عالبساطة )
- "Ealtaahunat" (Arabic: عالطاحونة )
- "Ya dart dawri" (Arabic: يا دارة دوري )
- "Ya mirsal almarasil" (Arabic:يا مرسال المراسيل )
- "Fayiq yahuana" (Arabic: فايق ياهوى )
- "Karam alealalii" (Arabic: كرم العلالي )
- "Min eizi alnawm" (Arabic:من عز النوم )
- "Tayri yatiarat" (Arabic:طيري ياطيارة )
- "Ealaa jisr allawaziat" (Arabic:على جسر اللوزية )
- "Albiwab" (Arabic: البواب )
- "Waraqu al'asfar" (Arabic: ورقو الأصفر )
- "Lamaa ealibab" (Arabic لما عالباب)
- "Yarit minan" (Arabic:ياريت منن )
- "Zahrat aljanub" ("asawarat aleurusa") (Arabic:( زهرة الجنوب (أسوارة العروس))
- "Taleali albukaa" (Arabic: طلعلي البكى )
- "Bilayl washatana" (Arabic: بليل وشتى )
- "Ya raei" (Arabic: يا راعي )
- "Suu rabyana" (Arabic: سوا ربينا )
- "Jayibali salam" (Arabic: جايبلي سلام )

=== Musical works with the Rahbani Brothers and Fairuz ===
Works which Philemon Wehbe composed his music:

- "Ealeali aldaar" (Arabic:عالعالي الدار )
  - (Lyrics:Hermanos Rahbani, Vocals: Nasri Shamseddin)
- "Ya marsal almarasil" (Arabic:يا مرسال المراسيل)
  - (Lyrics:Rahbani Brothers, Vocals: Fairuz)
- '"Tyry ya tayarat" (Arabic:طيري يا طيارة)
  - (Lyrics:Rahbani Brothers, Vocals: Fairuz)
- "Jaybaly salam" (Arabic:جايبلي سلام)
  - (Lyrics:Rahbani Brothers, Vocals: Fairuz)
- "Fayaq ya hawaa" (Arabic:فايق يا هوى)
  - (Lyrics:Rahbani Brothers, Vocals: Fairuz)
- "Syf ya sayf" (Arabic:صيّف يا صيف)
  - (Lyrics:Rahbani Brothers, Vocals: Fairuz)
- "Lylyt btrje ya layl" (Arabic:ليلية بترجع يا ليل)
  - (Lyrics:Rahbani Brothers, Vocals: Fairuz)
- "Ya dart dawri" (Arabic:يا دارة دوري)
  - (Lyrics:Rahbani Brothers, Vocals: Fairuz)
- "Min eizi alnuwm" (Arabic:من عز النوم)
  - (Lyrics:Rahbani Brothers, Vocals: Fairuz)
- "Yaryt minn " (Arabic:ياريت منن)
  - (Lyrics:Joseph Harb, Vocals: Fairuz)
- "Asamina" (Arabic:أسامينا)
  - (Lyrics:Joseph Harb, Vocals: Fairuz)
- "Taleali albakiu" (Arabic:طلعلي البكي)
  - (Lyrics:Joseph Harb, Vocals: Fairuz)

== Awards and distinctions ==
Philemon Wehbe received several awards and distinctions, among them are:

- "The Cedar Medal"
- "Order of Merit (Lebanon)"
- "Lebanese Army Medal"
- "Said Akl Award"

== See also ==
- Fairuz
- Sabah
- Wadih Al Safi
- Nasri Shamseddin
