= National Evangelical Church of Beirut =

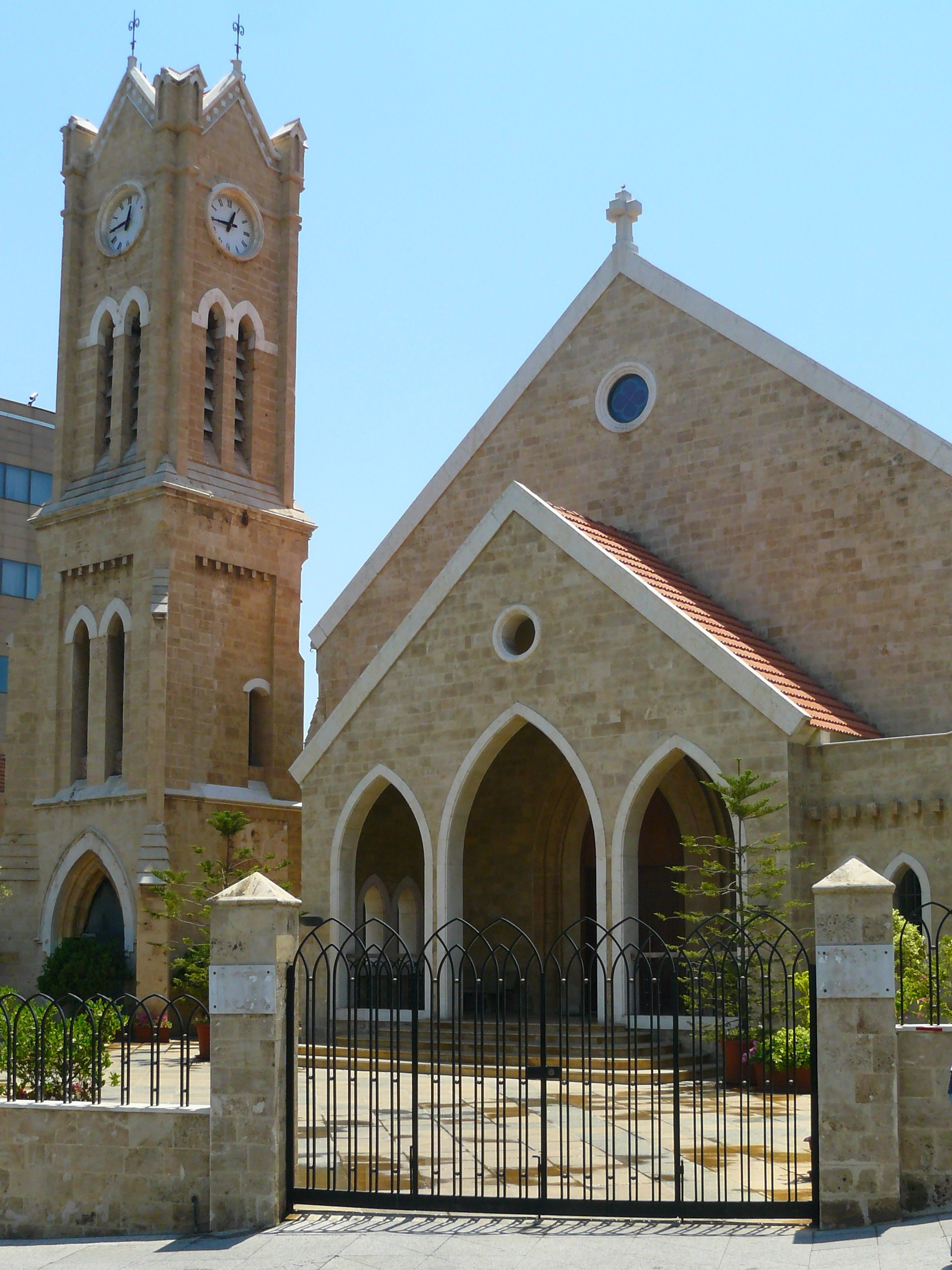

- The church shown within Beirut

Religion
- Affiliation: Protestant
- Year consecrated: 1870
- Status: active

Location
- Location: Beirut, Lebanon
- Coordinates: 33.894710°N 35.501477°E

Specifications
- Direction of façade: North
- Materials: Sandstone, limestone

The National Evangelical Church of Beirut (NEC) is a reformed church in Beirut, member of the National Evangelical Church Union of Lebanon.

== History ==
Established in the Lebanese capital, Beirut, in 1848 by Congregational and Presbyterian American missionaries, the NEC is the oldest and the largest of nine congregations situated outside Beirut in the towns of Abeih, Aramoun, Khaldeh, Kafarshima, Hadath, Dbayyeh, Jdeideh and Dhour el-Shweir.

The National Evangelical Church of Beirut is the headquarters and administrative centre of these nine churches which operate under the name of the National Evangelical Union of Lebanon (NEUL).

In 1870, the first Evangelical Church was built to house the Arabic and English speaking congregations. During the next hundred years, the church was the centre for all the activities and celebrations of both communities. Then during the Lebanese civil war (1975–1990) it was totally destroyed except for the bell tower and its congregation consequently scattered.

Since its reconstruction in 1998, the National Evangelical Church of Beirut has been standing again in the heart of Beirut's Central District, re-gathering its people with its worship services presided by Rev. Dr. Habib Badr as well as with its many socio-cultural and educational activities.

On 4 August 2020, the church was badly damaged in the Beirut explosion, when all of its stained glass windows were blown out.

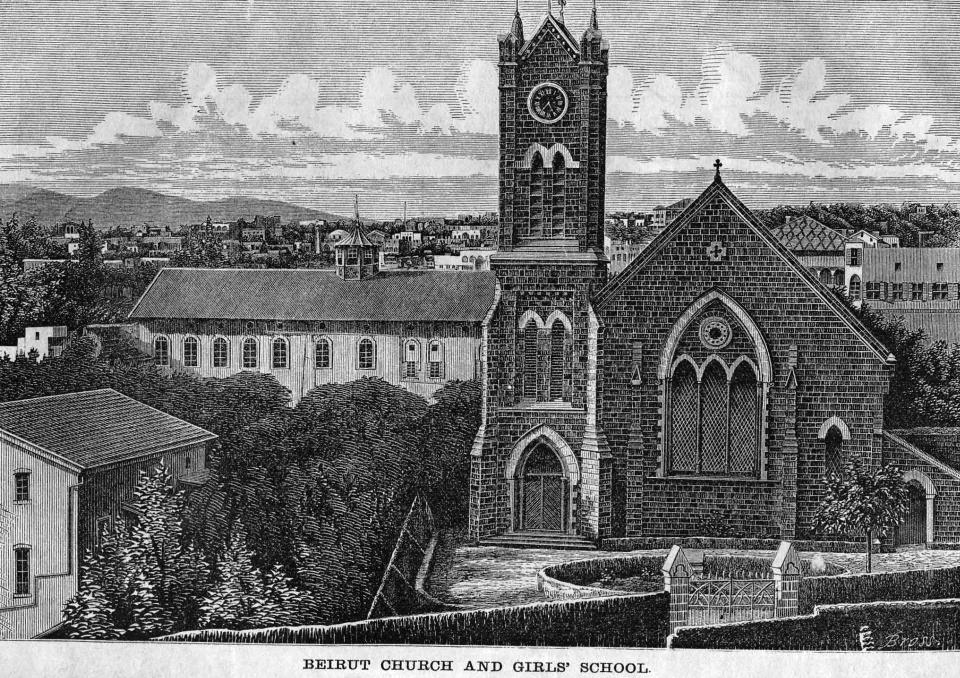
The church in 1872

== See also ==
- Protestantism in Lebanon
