= Joun =

Joun جون
- Village
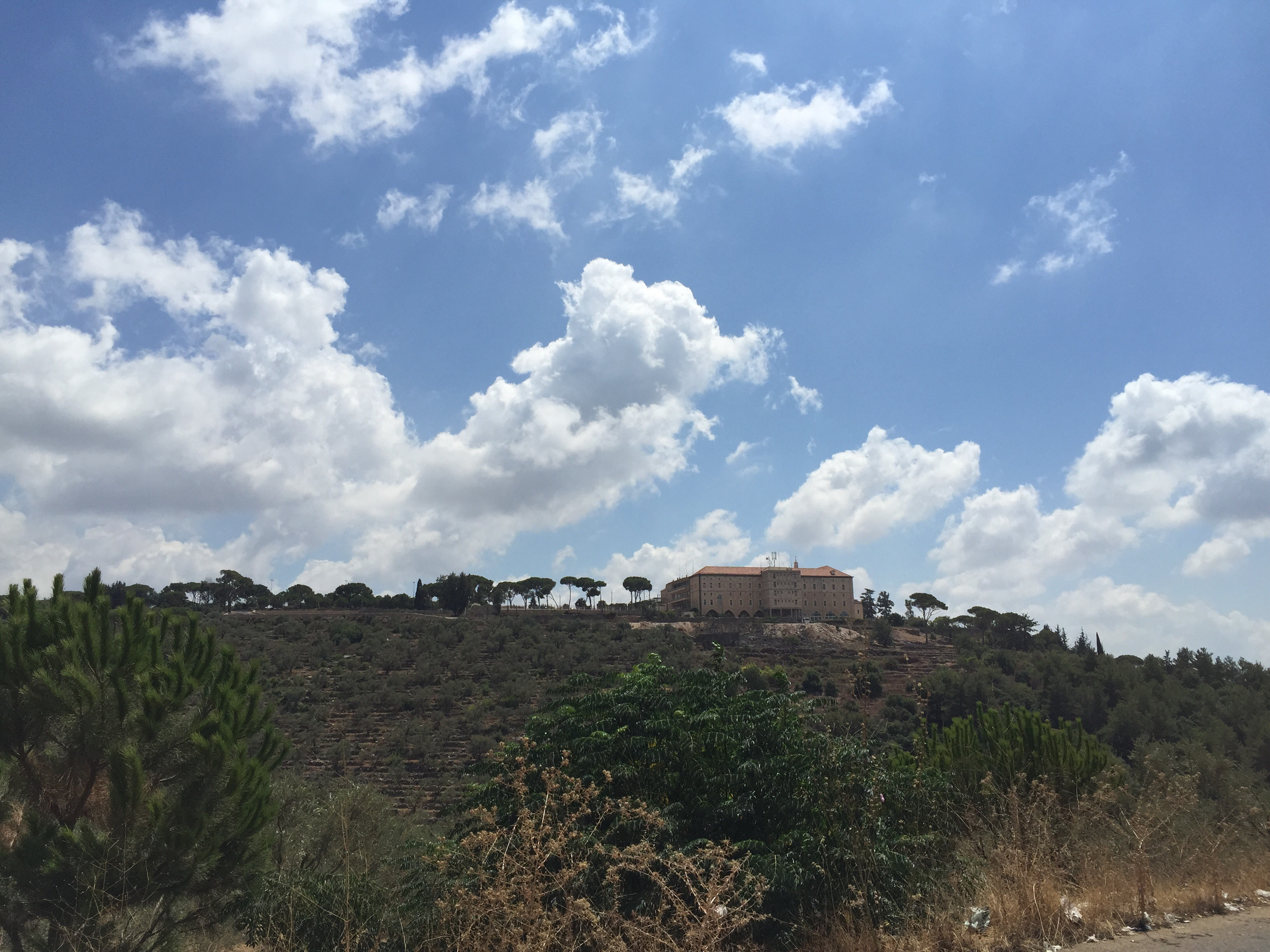

- Location within Lebanon
- Coordinates: 33°34′51″N 35°26′37″E
- Country: Lebanon
- Governorate: South Governorate
- District: Saida

Area
  - Total: 12.46 km^{2} (4.81 sq mi)
- Elevation: 406 m (1,332 ft)
- Time zone: UTC+2 (EET)
  - Summer (DST): UTC+3 (EEST)

Joun (Arabic: جون, romanized: Jūn) is a Lebanese village sitting on seven hills in the Sidon (Arabic: قضاء صيدا) district of the South Governorate at a distance of 13 kilometers from the city of Sidon in Lebanon. Joun means "the corner" in Aramaic, and it is located in between Mount Lebanon and South Lebanon, forming a corner shape.

Joun is a village of approximately 7,400 inhabitants, who are mainly Druze, Greek Catholic, Shiite, and Maronite.

== History ==
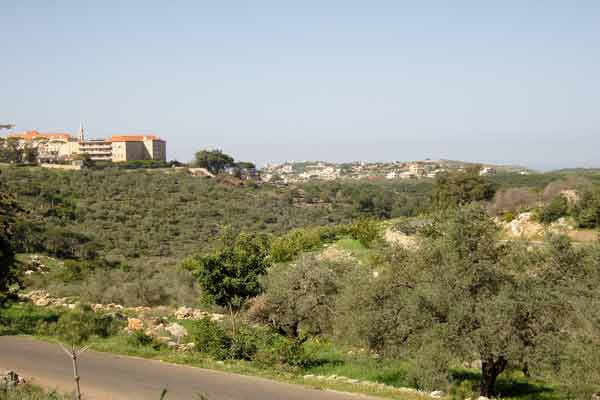

Joun is an old village located above the temple of the Phoenician god Eshmun near the city of Sidon.

In 1887, the Ottomans appointed the first commission of Joun. The members were: Gerges Chamy, Mitri Mousawbaa, Assaad Khoriaty, Mikhael Nab’aa, Youssef Gebran Khoury (Greek Catholics); Hossein Chamseddine, Hossein Saleh (Shiites); Ibrahim Youness, Youssef Estefan (Maronites); and Youssef Koussa (Protestant). Their tasks were to take care of the land of Joun and regulate the environment and day-to-day work, such as agricultural life and water, and also to supervise the local security. By 1898, the commission had its own logo, and each member had his own stamp, used it to sign official statements.

In 1903, the Ottoman Empire enacted a law which mandated that municipality members should be elected instead of recruited. Since then, Joun has had elected officials who both take care of local matters and supervise the relationship with the national authority.

== Notable people ==
- Lady Hester Stanhope, British antiquarian and explorer (1776–1839)
- Nasri Shamseddine, singer and actor
- Hassan Alaa Eddin, comedy theatre actor, producer, director
- Ali Chamseddine, physicist

== Joun today ==
Joun has three churches and one mosque. It also has four schools, two public and two private. Joun is a village rich in olive trees and grapes and is known for its olive oil and soap production.

== Geography ==
=== Monastery Saint Savior ===
Monastery of the Savior (Arabic: دير المخلص) of the Melkite Basilian Salvatorian Order was built in the early 18th century on a hill covered with pine and olive trees and grape vines and is located in the east side of Joun, and it constitutes a landmark in the Saida district.

=== Lady Hester Lucy Stanhope site ===
This site is located on another hill to the north east side of Joun. The site is known as "Dahr El Sitt" (Arabic: ضهر الست).

Lady Hester Stanhope settled until her death in the residence at the site, which is on the tip of one of the hills. She said in her memoirs, written by her longtime friend Doctor Charles Lewis Meryon, that the residence has been called by the villagers "Dahr El Sitt" or "Dar El Sitt". He also said that her house on the top of the hill was shaped "like half orange". The house had a garden and a stable and other buildings for storage. He implied that she liked the house because of its strategic location: "...the house on the summit of a conical hill, whence comers and goers might be seen on every side...", noting that the road from Joun to the cities of Sidon, Beirut, and Deir El Qamar all go into lonely mountains full of jackals and wolves.
