= Chouchou =

Chouchou may refer to:

- Chouchou (film), a 2003 comedy film by Merzak Allouache, starring Gad Elmaleh and Alain Chabat
- Chayote or chouchou, an edible plant belonging to the gourd family, Cucurbitaceae
- Chouchou, a film by Henri Desfontaines
- ChouCho, Japanese singer
- Chouchou (band), Japanese electronica duo
- Hassan Alaa Eddin, a Lebanese actor and singer who is also known as Chouchou
