= National Evangelical Church Union of Lebanon =

Evangelical church in Lebanon

The National Evangelical Church Union of Lebanon was founded by Presbyterian and Congregational missionaries from the United States. It is a member of the World Communion of Reformed Churches.

== History ==
The first reformed church was built in 1869. They have active Sunday school, and social cultural services.

In the war in Lebanon in 1975 most of the churches were destroyed, in Beirut church was able to continue the services however. After the war the denomination rebuilt it structure.

It has 9 congregations and 2,000 members. These congregations are in Beirut, Abeih, Aramoun, Khaldeh, Kafarshima, Hadath, Dbayyeth, Bhamdoun, Dhour El-Showeir.

== See also ==
- Protestantism in Lebanon
