= List of colleges of physicians =

A college of physicians is a national or provincial organisation concerned with the practice of medicine.

Such institutions include:

- American College of Physicians
- Ceylon College of Physicians
- Cook College of Physicians & Surgeons
- College of Physicians and Surgeons of Manitoba
- College of Physicians & Surgeons of Mumbai
- College of Physicians and Surgeons of Ontario
- College of Physicians & Surgeons Pakistan
- College of Physicians of Philadelphia
- Ghana College of Physicians and Surgeons
- Lebanese Order of Physicians
- Philippine College of Physicians
- Royal Australasian College of Physicians of Australia and New Zealand
- Royal College of Physicians and Surgeons of Canada
- Royal College of Physicians and Surgeons of Glasgow
- Royal College of Physicians of Edinburgh
- Royal College of Physicians of Ireland
- Royal College of Physicians of London
- Rwanda College of Physicians
- West African College of Physicians and Surgeons
