= Majdala =

Lebanese singer (1946–2020)

Majdala, born Naziha Moukarzel (October 12, 1946 – January 31, 2020) was a Lebanese singer, mostly known for her work during the "Golden Age" of Lebanon, between 1952 and 1976.

== Biography ==
Her name was created by Nadia Tueni, who also wrote her first musical play: Al Faraman. Majdala was discovered by producer Romeo Lahoud. He presented her to the Baalbeck Festival Jury in 1970, which directly agreed on his choice.

She played many first roles such as Safra in Al Faraman, at the 1970 Baalbeck Festival, and also four times at the Beiteddine Festival between 1971 and 1975, with Madinit el Farah, Bahr El Loulou, Mawsim El Tarrabich, and Wadi el Ghazar.

She sang with such performers as Wadih El Safi, Nasri Chams El Din, Philimon Wehbe, Joseph Azar, Samir Yazbeck, Issam Rajji, Antoine Kerbaj, Rida Khoury, Chouchou, Melhim Barakat, Marwan Mahfouz, Fehmen, Samir Rahal, Nadim Berberi, Georgette Sayyigh, and Nabih Abou El Hessen.

The composers of her songs were Zaki Nassif, Romeo Lahoud, Issam Rajji, Elie Choueiry, Melhim Barakat, Elias El Rahbani, Ziad Rahbani, Azar Habib, Philimon Wehbe and Hassan Abd El Nabi.

In 1976 the Lebanese Civil War began, and Majdala decided to retire from singing. She married Nabil Khater and gave birth in 1977 to her daughter Majdala Khater. In 1981, she gave birth to her second child, her son Nidal Khater. She then moved to France, where she spent a large part of her life raising her children. In 1999, she decided to return to Lebanon, where she lived until her death in 2020.

In November 2008, with composer Ihsan Al Mounzer, she released a new version of her song "Ghanili Ba3ed", followed by "Ghano El Assayid".

== Discography ==
- 3abassa El Chawk
- 3al Darb El Ba3idi
- 3alatoul Ya Habibi Nattir
- 3am Tollik ya Madinetna
- 3amer Darrak 3al 3alli
- 3ouyoun El Ghazal
- Ana Wedaytelo Mkatibi
- Ana Wel Rih El Jabaliyi
- Atafou El Ward
- Bta3rif Ya Amarna
- Dakhlak Ya Habibi
- Dakhlak Ya Mersalli
- Dayim Dayim Ya Bladi
- Ghanili Ba3ed
- Ghano El Asayid
- Gharibi
- Habibi Ismo Lubnan
- Hajarouna
- Hallak Hal
- Mara2 el Sayf
- Mchina Mchina
- Natartak 3al Rawabi
- Rayha Mchawir B3aed
- Sa2alouni Ya Habibi
- Sehir El Layl
- Sotfi Kanit
- Tahet El Zayzafouni
- Tarakouni Ahli Bi Hal Leil
- Tayyir Tayyir
- Wayn Sarro El Ahbab
- Ya Amar Ya Nassina
- Ya Nijmit El Layl
