= National Protestant College =

National Protestant College (NPC)

Location
- Ras Beirut; Lebanon; 33°49′7″N 35°32′1″E

Information
- Type: Private
- Established: 1949
- President: Leila Salibi Dagher
- Principal: Nisrine Jabbour
- Gender: Co-educational
- Website: Official website

The National Protestant College is a Lebanese school that was established by the National Evangelical Union of Lebanon, the oldest indigenous Arabic-speaking Protestant congregation in the Middle East. Originally located in Dbayeh, the building moved to West Beirut, near Rue Hamra (Haigazian University) during the Lebanese Civil war. In 1997, NPC moved permanently to Kfarshima.

The languages taught at NPC are Arabic, English, and French. There were another branch for boys in the 50s called The National Protestant secondary school in Beirut (first in sin al mraiseh then moved to kanrari opp. Al masherk hospital) headed by principal Kamel deer.

== See also ==
- Protestantism in Lebanon
