= Lebanese Baptist Evangelical Convention =

Baptist Christian denomination in Lebanon

- Classification: Evangelical Christianity
- Theology: Baptist
- Associations: Baptist World Alliance
- Headquarters: Beirut
- Origin: 1955
- Congregations: 32
- Members: 1,600
- Seminaries: Arab Baptist Theological Seminary
- Official website: lebanesebaptist.com

The Lebanese Baptist Evangelical Convention is a Baptist Christian denomination in Lebanon. It was founded in 1955 as a plant of the American Southern Baptist Convention but eventually gained independence. It is affiliated with the Baptist World Alliance. The headquarters is in Beirut.

== History ==
The Convention has its origins in the founding of the first Baptist church in Beirut in 1895 by the American pastor Said Jureidini. In 1948, missionaries from the American Southern Baptist Convention arrived in Lebanon to preach to the people there. These were followed by the Scottish Presbyterian missionary Reverend Graham Finlay, educated at the Southwestern Baptist Theological Seminary in Texas, United States and started to assist with the spread of Baptism into wider Lebanon from Beirut. It was officially founded in 1955 by various churches. According to a census published by the association in 2023, it claimed 32 churches and 1,600 members. After 1955, they initially retained dependency on the Southern Baptist Convention and mostly engaging in Christian exchanges with Baptists in the United States. However, they gradually started to adapt their outreach work to engage more with Lebanon's Muslim communities and proselytise via focussing on Jesus rather than scripture.

== Schools ==
In 1959, the Lebanese Baptist Evangelical Convention opened their own publishing house in Beirut and a year later they added a seminary to the publishing house campus, which started teaching Baptist ministry to people from across the Arab world. In 1960, it founded the Arab Baptist Theological Seminary in Mansourieh. During the 2026 Lebanon war, the Baptists used their seminary as a makeshift evacuee camp with them transferring learning online to allow the classrooms to be used.

== See also ==
- Christianity in Lebanon
- Lebanese Protestant Christians
- Religion in Lebanon
