= Hanna K. Korany =

Syrian writer (1871–1898)

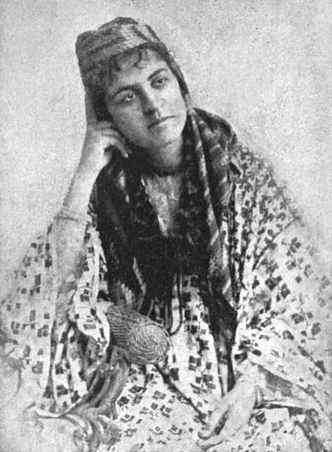
- Hanna K. Korany, from an 1894 publication
- Born: 1871
- Died: 1898 (aged 26–27)
- Other name: Hanna Kurani
- Occupation: Writer
- Spouse: Amin Effendi Korany (m. 1887)

Hanna K. Korany (1871–1898), also seen as Hanna Kurani, was a Syrian writer. From 1893 to 1895 she toured the United States, speaking on women's lives in Syria.

== Early life ==
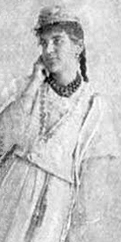
Hanna K. Korany (1895)

Hanna K. Korany was from Kfarshima in the Mount Lebanon region, and educated at a Presbyterian missionary school for girls in Beirut.

== Career ==
In 1891, she published Manners and Habits, a book in Arabic. She also wrote a novel in Arabic, and was somewhat prematurely labeled "the George Eliot of Syria" by one American newspaper. In 1893, Korany was invited by Bertha Palmer to represent Syria at the World's Congress of Representative Women, an event associated with the World's Columbian Exposition that year. She also displayed Syrian women's embroidery and handiwork at the fair, reported on the fair for Al-Fatat, a woman's magazine based in Egypt, and wrote an essay, "The Glory of Womanhood", for the Congress of Women publication.

She went on a lecture tour in the United States after her Chicago activities were finished. In 1894 she attended the annual convention of the National American Woman Suffrage Association in Washington, D.C., and spoke at a society dinner on the same program with Elizabeth Cady Stanton, Susan B. Anthony, Lillie Devereux Blake, and May Wright Sewall. In 1896 she started a woman's club in Beirut.

== Personal life ==
She married Amin Effendi Korany in 1887. Hanna Korany died in 1898, aged 27 years, in Beirut.
