= Christianity in Lebanon =

- Flag of Lebanon, the cedar of Lebanon is a historical Lebanese Christian symbol

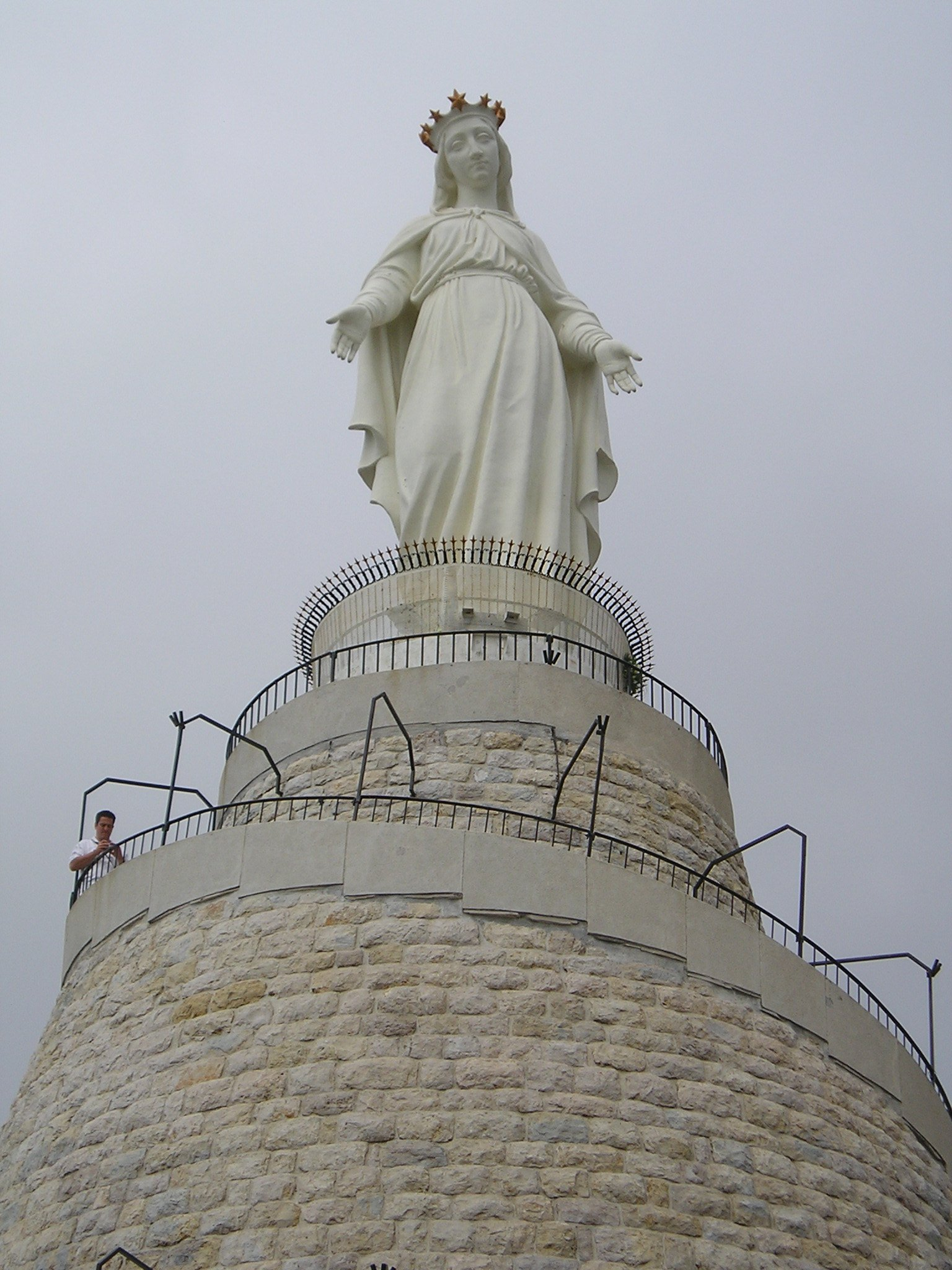
- Shrine of Our Lady of Lebanon

Total population
- 2,234,300 (43.9%) (2024)

Religions
- Maronite Church; Greek Orthodox Church of Antioch; Melkite Greek Catholic Church; Armenian Apostolic Church; (See Religion in Lebanon)

Christianity has a long and continuous history in Lebanon. Biblical scriptures show that Peter and Paul evangelized the Phoenicians, leading to the dawn of the ancient Patriarchate of Antioch. As such, Christianity in Lebanon is as old as the Christian faith itself. Christianity spread slowly in Lebanon due to pagans who resisted conversion, but it ultimately spread throughout the country. Even after centuries of living under Muslim empires, Christianity remains the dominant faith of the Mount Lebanon region and has substantial communities elsewhere.

The Maronites and the Druze founded modern Lebanon in the nineteenth century, through a governing and social system known as the "Maronite-Druze dualism" in the Mount Lebanon Mutasarrifate. Lebanon has the second highest proportion of Christians of any Middle Eastern country (after Cyprus), estimated to be between 37% and 43%; Egypt and Syria are next, at roughly 10%. Lebanese Christians constitute the majority of the Lebanese diaspora worldwide.

== History ==
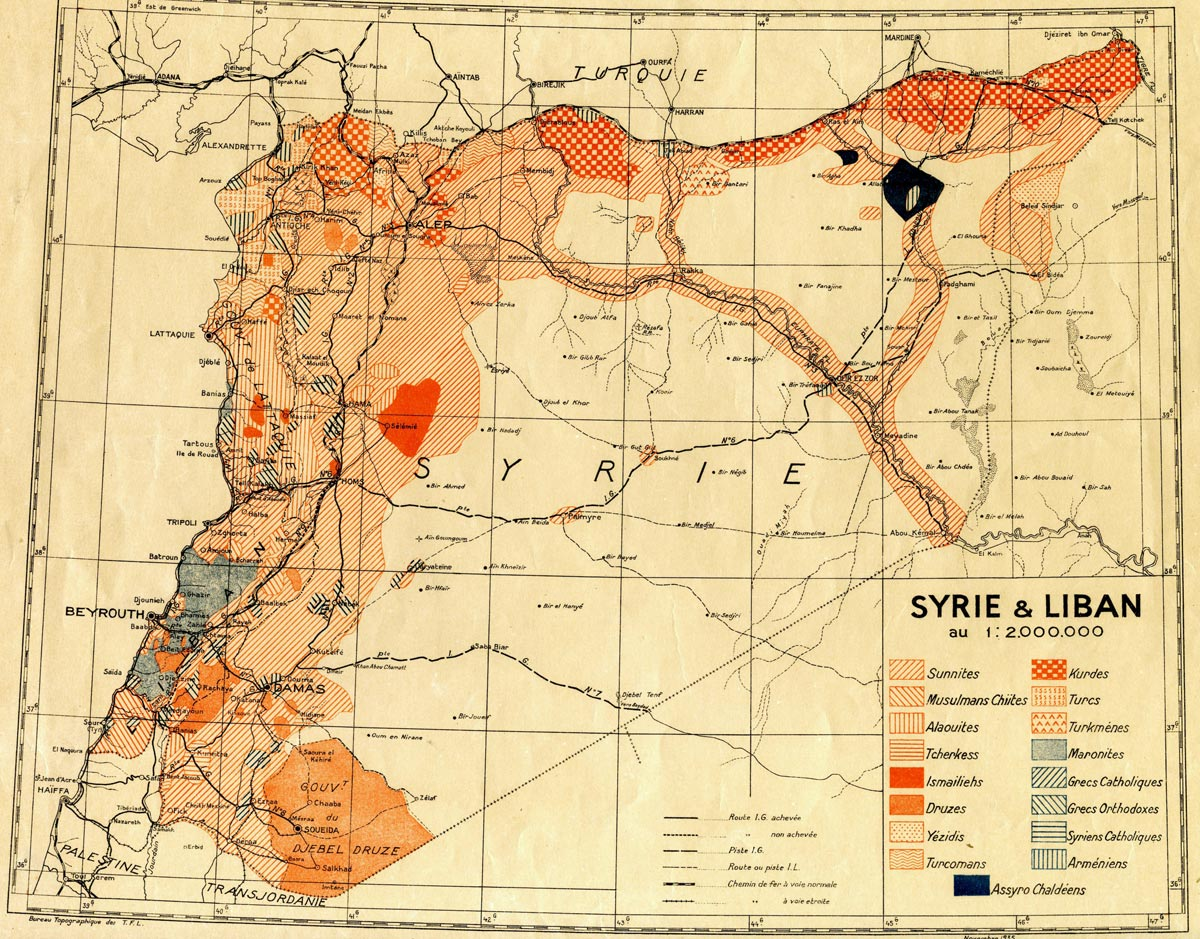
A map of religious and ethnic communities of Syria and Lebanon (1935)

Before the Christian faith reached the territory of Lebanon, Jesus had traveled to its southern parts near Tyre where the scripture tells that he cured a possessed Canaanite child. (Note: Jesus left that place and went to the vicinity of Tyre. He entered a house and did not want anyone to know it; yet he could not keep his presence secret. In fact, as soon as she heard about him, a woman whose little daughter was possessed by an evil spirit came and fell at his feet. She begged Jesus to drive the demon out of her daughter. (Mark 7:24–26 NIV)) Christianity in Lebanon is as old as gentile Christian faith itself. Early reports relate the possibility that Saint Peter himself was the one who evangelized the Phoenicians whom he affiliated to the ancient Patriarchate of Antioch. Paul also preached in Lebanon, having lingered with the early Christians in Tyre and Sidon. Even though Christianity was introduced to Lebanon after the first century AD, its spread was very slow, particularly in the mountainous areas where paganism was still unyielding.

The earliest indisputable tradition of Christianity in Lebanon can be traced back to Saint Maron in the 4th century AD, being of Greek/Eastern/Antiochian Orthodox origin and the founder of national and ecclesiastical Maronitism. Saint Maron adopted an ascetic and reclusive life on the banks of the Orontes river in the vicinity of Homs–Syria and founded a community of monks which began to preach the gospel in the surrounding areas. By faith, liturgy, rite, religious books and heritage, the Maronites were of Eastern origin. The Saint Maron Monastery was too close to Antioch to grant the monks their freedom and autonomy, which prompted Saint John Maron, the first Maronite patriarch-elect, to lead his monks into the Lebanese mountains to escape emperor Justinian II's persecution, finally settling in the Qadisha valley. Nevertheless, the influence of the Maronite establishment spread throughout the Lebanese mountains and became a considerable feudal force. The existence of the Maronites was largely ignored by the western world until the Crusades. In the 16th century, the Maronite Church adopted the catechism of the Catholic Church and reaffirmed its relationship with it. Moreover, Rome dispatched Franciscan, Dominican and later Jesuit missionaries to Lebanon to Latinise the Maronites.

The relationship between the Druze and Christians has been characterized by harmony and peaceful coexistence, with amicable relations between the two groups prevailing throughout history, with the exception of some periods, including 1860 Mount Lebanon civil war.

Due to their turbulent history, the Maronites formed a secluded identity in the mountains and valleys of Lebanon, led by the Maronite patriarch who voiced his opinion on contemporary issues. They identify themselves as a unique community whose religion and culture is distinct from the predominantly Muslim Arab world. The Maronites played a major part in the definition of and the creation of the state of Lebanon. The modern state of Greater Lebanon was established by France in 1920 after the instigation of ambitious Maronite leaders headed by patriarch Elias Peter Hoayek, who presided over delegations to France following World War I and requested the re-establishment of the entity of the Principality of Lebanon (1515AD–1840AD). With the creation of the state of Lebanon, Arabism was overcome by Lebanism, which emphasizes Lebanon's Mediterranean and Phoenician heritage. In the National Pact, an unwritten gentleman's agreement between the Maronite President Bshara el-Khoury and Sunni prime minister Riad as-Solh, the seats of presidency were distributed between the main Lebanese religious denominations. According to the pact, the President of the Lebanese republic shall always be a Maronite. Furthermore, the pact also states that Lebanon is a state with an "Arab face" (not an Arab identity).

In October 2026, priest Samir Mikhael Daou, who served the parishes of Hsoun and Ferhet, was murdered at his home.

== Demographics ==
Distribution of Lebanese Christians in 2014
1. Maronites (54.0%)
2. Orthodox (20.8%)
3. Melkites (12.9%)
4. Other Christians (Note: Includes Armenian Orthodox, Armenian Catholic, Chaldean, Assyrian, Syriac Orthodox, Syrian Catholic, Coptic orthodox, Coptic Catholic and Protestants) (12.3%)
Distribution of Lebanese Christians in 2022
1. Maronites (53.2%)
2. Orthodox (20.7%)
3. Melkites (14.1%)
4. Other Christians (12.7%)

In 2014, according to *وقائع إنتخابية عن لبنان، حسب لوائح الناخبين الرسمية الصادرة عن وزارة الداخلية اللبنانية لسنة ٢٠١٤*, Christians made up 36.66% of registered voters aged 21 and above: 19.97% Maronites, 7.69% Orthodox, 5.01% Melkites and 4.22% other Christian minorities. In 2022, based on the registered voters aged 21+ for the elections, Christian represented 37.46%: 19.94% Maronites, 7.82% Orthodox, 5.26% Melkite and 4.75% other Christian minorities. The overall proportions remained very stable between 2014 and 2022, with only slight increases in all groups.

Year	Christians				
Year	Total	Maronites	Orthodox	Melkites	Other Christians
2014	36.97%	19.97%	7.69%	5.01%	4.22%
2022	37.46%	19.94%	7.82%	5.26%	4.75%

Year	Christians				
Year	Total	Maronites	Orthodox	Melkites	Other Christians
2014	1 299 175	701 920	270 180	167 736	159 348
2022	1 510 305	797 174	312 725	210 541	189 872
Growth	+211 130	+95 254	+42 545	+42 805	+30 526
% growth	▲13.97%	▲11.95%	▲13.60%	▲20.33%	▲16.01%

Note that the following percentages are estimates only. As the last Lebanese census was conducted in 1932, it is difficult to have precise population estimates.

Distribution of Lebanese Christians by governorates
Governorates of Lebanon	2014		2022	
Governorates of Lebanon	Pop.	%	Pop.	%
Mount Lebanon Governorate	366 393	56.56%	407 889	57.29%
North Governorate	252 609	44.95%	280 909	44.08%
Beirut Governorate	168 412	36.08%	215 150	40.69%
Keserwan-Jbeil Governorate	148 766	87.43%	160 950	87.92%
Beqaa Governorate	124 195	41.29%	142 572	41.47%
South Governorate	83 430	21.15%	100 919	21.76%
Akkar Governorate	70 947	27.55%	80 786	26.74%
Nabatieh Governorate	44 046	10.41%	60 112	12.22%
Baalbek-Hermel Governorate	40 377	13.82%	52 366	15.75%
Total Lebanese Christian population	1 299 175	36.97%	1 497 935	37.46%

Repartition of Lebanese Maronite Christians in Lebanon
Governorates of Lebanon	2014		2022	
Governorates of Lebanon	Pop.	%	Pop.	%
Mount Lebanon Governorate	212 997	30.34%	236 918	29.72%
North Governorate	170 514	24.29%	186 987	23.46%
Keserwan-Jbeil Governorate	128 802	18.35%	139 804	17.54%
South Governorate	47 869	6.82%	55 768	7%
Beqaa Governorate	38 321	5.46%	45 040	5.65%
Akkar Governorate	29 537	4.21%	33 271	4.17%
Beirut Governorate	28 534	4.07%	40 275	5.05%
Nabatieh Governorate	23 355	3.33%	31 440	3.94%
Baalbek-Hermel Governorate	21 991	3.13%	27 671	3.47%
Total Lebanese Maronite population	701 920	100%	797 174	100%

Repartition of Lebanese Greek Orthodox Christians in Lebanon
Governorates of Lebanon	2014		2022	
Governorates of Lebanon	Pop.	%	Pop.	%
North Governorate	70 784	26.2%	81 338	26.01%
Mount Lebanon Governorate	60 465	22.38%	72 342	23.13%
Beirut Governorate	45 843	16.97%	46 908	15%
Akkar Governorate	36 798	13.62%	41 244	13.19%
Beqaa Governorate	31 578	11.69%	34 941	11.17%
Nabatieh Governorate	10 441	3.86%	17 542	5.61%
Keserwan-Jbeil Governorate	7 887	2.92%	7 734	2.47%
South Governorate	3 588	1.33%	5 827	1.86%
Baalbek-Hermel Governorate	2 796	1.03%	4 939	1.58%
Total Lebanese Orthodox population	270 180	100%	312 725	100%

Repartition of Lebanese Melkite Christians in Lebanon
Governorates of Lebanon	2014		2022	
Governorates of Lebanon	Pop.	%	Pop.	%
Mount Lebanon Governorate	45 547	27.15%	48 861	23.21%
Beqaa Governorate	40 457	24.12%	46 463	22.07%
South Governorate	27 942	16.66%	34 542	16.41%
Beirut Governorate	25 434	15.16%	32 289	15.34%
Baalbek-Hermel Governorate	15 070	8.98%	18 563	8.82%
Nabatieh Governorate	8 068	4.81%	11 024	5.24%
Keserwan-Jbeil Governorate	6 774	4.04%	6 430	3.05%
North Governorate	6 040	3.6%	7 627	3.62%
Akkar Governorate	3 341	1.99%	4 742	1.29%
Total Lebanese Melkite population	167 736	100%	210 541	100%

Repartition of Other Christians in Lebanon
Governorates of Lebanon	2014		2022	
Governorates of Lebanon	Pop.	%	Pop.	%
Beirut Governorate	68 601	43.05%	92 040	48.47%
Mount Lebanon Governorate	47 384	29.74%	52 862	27.84%
Beqaa Governorate	13 839	8.68%	19 222	10.12%
Keserwan-Jbeil Governorate	5 303	3.33%	6 982	3.68%
North Governorate	5 271	3.31%	8 062	4.25%
South Governorate	4 031	2.53%	4 782	2.52%
Nabatieh Governorate	2 182	1.37%	3 200	1.69%
Akkar Governorate	1 271	0.8%	1 529	0.81%
Baalbek-Hermel Governorate	520	0.33%	1 193	0.63%
Total Lebanese other Christian population	159 348	100%	189 872	100%

Lebanon has the highest proportion of Christians of any country in the Middle East, but exact size of this population has been disputed for many years. One estimate of the Christian share of Lebanon's population, as of 2012, was 40.5%. And more recently, in 2018 the CIA World Factbook estimated that Christians constituted 33.7% of Lebanon's population.

Half of the Lebanese Christians, around a million, dwell in districts where they constitute the majority (75-95%): Matn (governorate of Mount Lebanon), Byblos and Kesrwan (governorate of Keserwan-Jbeil), Batroun, Bsharri, Koura and Zgharta (in the North governorate). These districts form a strip with Beirut in the South, Tripoli in the North, the Mediterranean sea in the West, and the Mount Lebanon range in the East. The district of Jezzine forms a pocket with a Christian majority in the South governorate. Christians constitute important minorities in the districts of Baadba, Aley and Chouf (Mount Lebanon governorate), Zahle (Beqaa), and Beirut.

The Maronite Church, an Eastern Catholic church in full communion with the Catholic Church, is the largest and politically most active and influential denomination of Lebanon's Christians. The Catholic Church also includes other Eastern Catholic churches, such as the Melkite Catholic Church. The Greek Orthodox Church forms the second-largest proportion of Lebanese Christians. The Armenian Apostolic Church also forms a large portion of the Christian population in Lebanon.

The other six smaller Christian sects are considered ethnic Assyrians (Syriac Orthodox, Syriac Catholics, Assyrian Church of the East and Chaldean Catholics).

In the Lebanese Parliament, Christians hold 64 seats in tandem with 64 seats for Lebanese Muslims. The Maronites are allotted 34 seats, the Eastern Orthodox 14, Melkites eight, the Armenians Apostolics five, Catholic Armenians one, Protestants one, and other Christian minority groups, one.

== Churches and monasteries in Lebanon ==
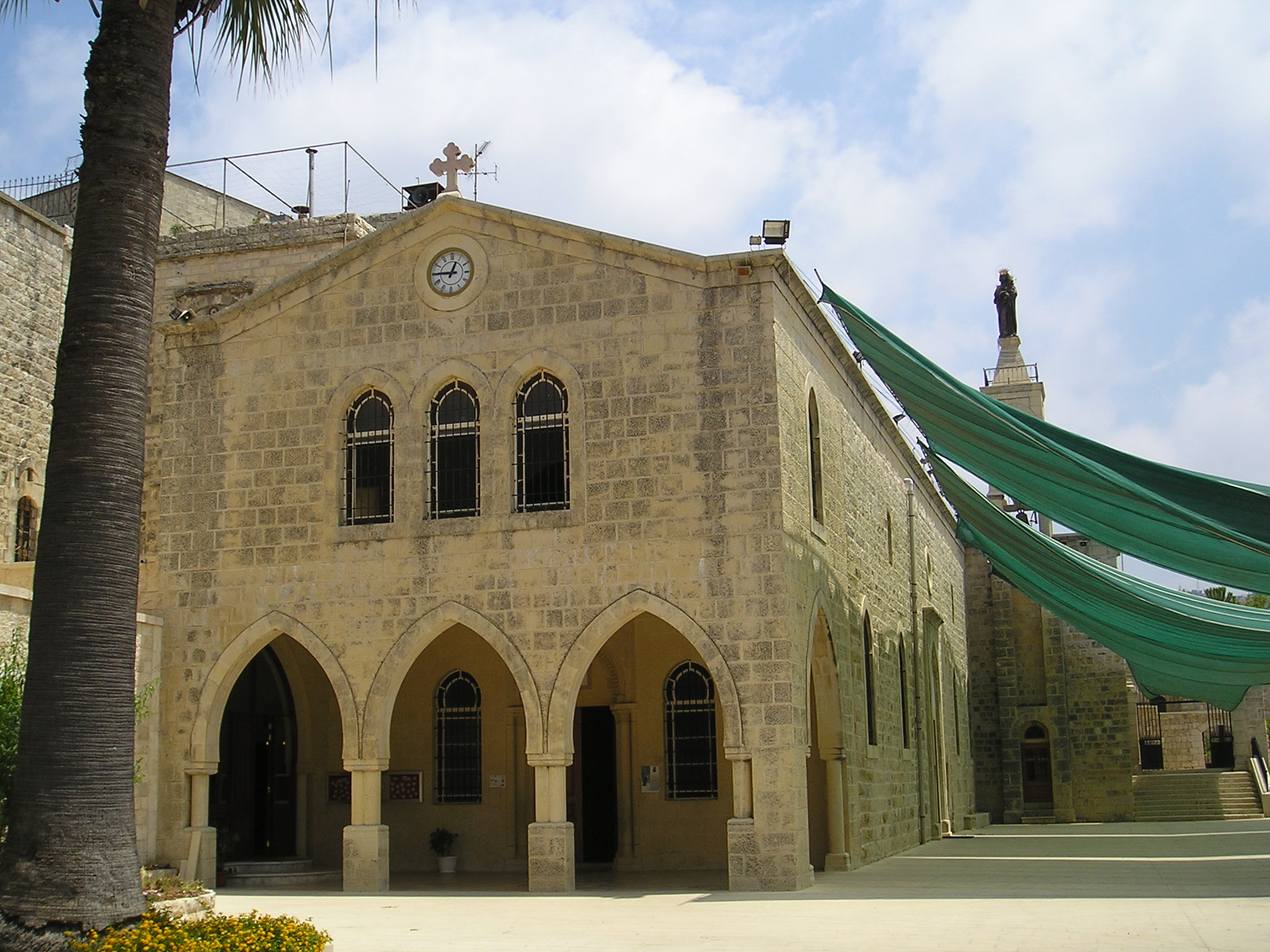
Maronite Church of Saidet et Tallé in Deir el Qamar, Lebanon.

The head of the Maronite Church is the Maronite Patriarch of Antioch, who is elected by the bishops of the Maronite church and now resides in Bkerké, north of Beirut (but in the northern town of Dimane during the summer months). The current Patriarch (from 2011) is Mar Bechara Boutros al-Rahi. When a new patriarch is elected and enthroned, he requests ecclesiastic communion from the Pope, thus maintaining communion within the Catholic Church. Patriarchs may also be accorded the status of cardinals, in the rank of cardinal-bishops.

The Seat of the Maronite Catholic Church is in Bkerké. Monasteries in Lebanon are run by both the Maronite and Orthodox churches. The Holy Monastery of Saint George in Deir El Harf and Saint John the Baptist Monastery in Douma both date back to the 5th century. The Balamand Monastery in Tripoli is a very prominent Orthodox monastery that has a seminary and a university associated with it.

According to the Directory of Churches in Lebanon, the country is home to more than 2,000 churches spread across all governorates. These churches serve a wide range of Christian communities and stand as enduring symbols of Lebanon's rich religious heritage. The directory documents thousands of places of worship and provides historical information on many of the nation's most significant churches, monasteries, shrines, and Christian landmarks.

== Role in politics ==
Unlike Shiites, who mostly support the Amal Movement and Hezbollah alliance, Christian politics is characterized by deep political fragmentation caused by the Lebanese civil war, with some aligned with the Kataeb party, Michel Aoun's Free Patriotic Movement, the El Marada Party headed by Suleiman Frangieh, Jr., the Lebanese Forces Movement Samir Geagea, and others within the collection of various 14 March Christian leaders.

The political role of Christianity in Lebanon emerged from the Ottoman millet system, which granted autonomous governance to religious communities particularly with declaration of the Double Qaim-Maqamate of Mount Lebanon in 1843 dividing Mount Lebanon into two administrative regions ruled by the Druze and the Christians. During the 19th century, Maronite Christians in Mount Lebanon developed a semi-autonomous status under European protection, particularly French, culminating in the 1860 Mount Lebanon Mutasarrifate, a Christian-governed Ottoman district. This established precedents for Christian political autonomy within a Muslim-majority region.

On 27 October 1919, the Lebanese delegation led by Maronite Patriarch Elias Peter Hoayek presented the Lebanese aspirations in a memorandum to the Paris Peace Conference. This included a significant extension of the frontiers of the Lebanon Mutasarrifate, arguing that the additional areas constituted natural parts of Lebanon although the Christian community would not be a clear majority in such an enlarged state. The quest for the annexation of agricultural lands in the Bekaa and Akkar was fueled by existential fears following the death of nearly half of the Mount Lebanon Mutasarrifate population in the Great Famine; the Maronite church and the secular leaders sought a state that could better provide for its people.

The unwritten National Pact of 1943, negotiated between Maronite President Bechara El Khoury and Sunni Prime Minister Riad Al Solh, established Lebanon's confessional power-sharing formula. Christians accepted Lebanon's "Arab face" and renounced Western protection, while Muslims abandoned aspirations for union with Syria. The pact reserved the presidency for a Maronite Christian, the premiership for a Sunni Muslim, and the parliamentary speakership for a Shi'a Muslim. Parliamentary seats were allocated on a 6:5 Christian-Muslim ratio based on the 1932 census, which showed a Christian majority.

During the Lebanese Civil War, Christian political leaders viewed the battles as an existential struggle to preserve Christian political dominance and prevent the Palestinian Liberation Organization (PLO) from transforming Lebanon into a base for operations against Israel. The PLO's armed presence in southern Lebanon and its alliance with Muslim and leftist factions threatened the delicate confessional balance that underpinned Christian political power. Christian militias, initially organized as neighborhood defense forces, rapidly evolved into sophisticated military organizations controlling large territories referred to as cantons.

Rivalries between militia leaders, ideological differences, and competition for foreign patronage produced violent conflicts between Christian parties. By 1977, relations within the Lebanese Front had deteriorated significantly, particularly between the Lebanese Phalanges (Kataeb) and their former allies in the Marada Movement. This rift emerged after the Phalanges pursued a strategic alignment with Israel—an initiative firmly rejected by the Maradas, who were staunchly anti-Zionist and closely aligned with Syria.[1 As tensions escalated, armed clashes broke out between forces loyal to Bashir Gemayel and the Marada Brigade. During this period, Bashir Gemayel sought to consolidate Christian militias under a unified command by forcibly integrating them into the Lebanese Forces and dismantling independent militias. This policy intensified inter-Christian violence, culminating in 1980 with the forced absorption of Dany Chamoun’s Tiger Militia into the LF.

The Taif Agreement helped establish a power-sharing system between the Christian and Muslim Lebanese political parties. The political and economic situation in Lebanon had improved greatly. Lebanon had rebuilt its infrastructure. Historical and contemporary conflicts between Hezbollah and Israel have threatened to deteriorate Lebanon's political and economic situation, with growing tension between the 8 and 14 March alliances and threatening Lebanon with renewed strife.

The constitutional remit of the president includes the role of Commander in Chief of the armed forces, as well as the sole ability to form and dissolve governments. Many Lebanese leaders, as well as global powers, continue to lobby to roll back features of the Taif Agreement that eroded the constitutional powers of the president of the republic. The role of president of the Lebanese Central bank is also a position reserved for Lebanese Christians. This is due to the historical and contemporary influence of Lebanese Christians among the key bankers of the Middle East region.

Although Lebanon is a secular country, family matters such as marriage, divorce, and inheritance are still handled by the religious authorities representing a person's faith. Calls for civil marriage are unanimously rejected by the religious authorities but civil marriages conducted in another country are recognized by Lebanese civil authorities.

Non-religion is not recognized by the state. But the Minister of the Interior Ziad Baroud made it possible in 2009 to have religious affiliation removed from the Lebanese identity card. This does not, however, deny the religious authorities' complete control over civil family issues inside the country.

== Christian denominations among Lebanese people ==
=== Maronite Catholic ===
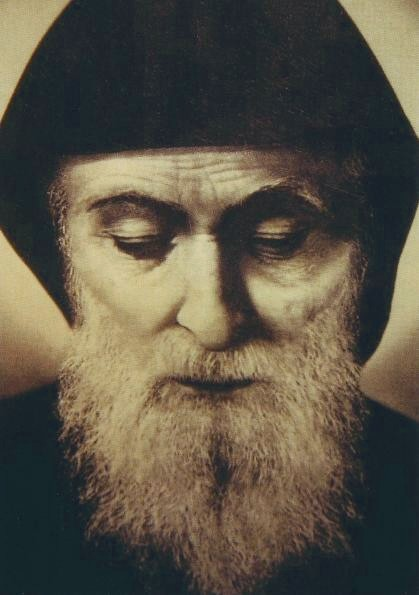
Portrait of Saint Charbel Makhlouf who was a Maronite monk and priest.

The Maronite Christians of Lebanon are the largest Christian denomination among the Lebanese people, representing 21% of the Lebanese population.

The Maronite Church's full communion with the Catholic Church was reaffirmed in 1182, after hundreds of years of isolation in Mount Lebanon. By the terms of union, they retain their rites and canon law and use Arabic and Aramaic in their liturgy, as well the Karshuni script with old Syriac letters. Their origins are uncertain. One version traces them to John Maron of Antioch in the seventh century A.D.; another points to St. Maron, a monk in the late fourth and early fifth centuries (who is considered by many to be the true origin of the Maronite Church). The words "maron" or "marun" in Syriac mean "small lord."

In the late seventh century, as a result of persecutions from other Christians for the heterodox views they had adopted, the Maronites withdrew from the coastal regions into the mountainous areas of Lebanon and Syria. During the Ottoman era (1516–1914) they remained isolated and relatively independent in these areas. In 1857 and 1858 the Maronites revolted against the large landowning families. The revolt was followed by a further struggle between the Druzes and Maronites over land ownership, political power, and safe passage of community members in the territory of the other. The conflict led France to send a military expedition to the area in 1860. The disagreements diminished in intensity only after the establishment of the Mandate and a political formula whereby all denominations achieved a degree of political representation.

Besides the Beirut archdiocese, nine other archdioceses and dioceses are in the Middle East: Aleppo, Damascus, Jubayl-Al Batrun, Cyprus, Baalbek, Tripoli, Tyre, Sidon, and Cairo. Parishes and independent dioceses are situated in Argentina, Brazil, Venezuela, the United States, Canada, Mexico, Côte d'Ivoire, and Senegal. There are four minor seminaries in Lebanon (Al Batrun, Ghazir, Ayn Saadah, and Trablous) and a faculty of theology at the University of the Holy Spirit at Al Kaslik, which is run by the Maronite Monastic Order. The patriarch is elected in a secret ceremony by a synod of bishops and confirmed by the Pope.

Leaders of the Rite have considered Maronite Christianity as the "foundation of the Lebanese nation". The Maronites have been closely associated with the political system of independent Lebanon; it was estimated that in pre-Civil War Lebanon, members of this Rite held a large portion of the leading posts. However, roles were shifted due to the Taif Agreement's theoretical balancing of power.

=== Greek Orthodox ===
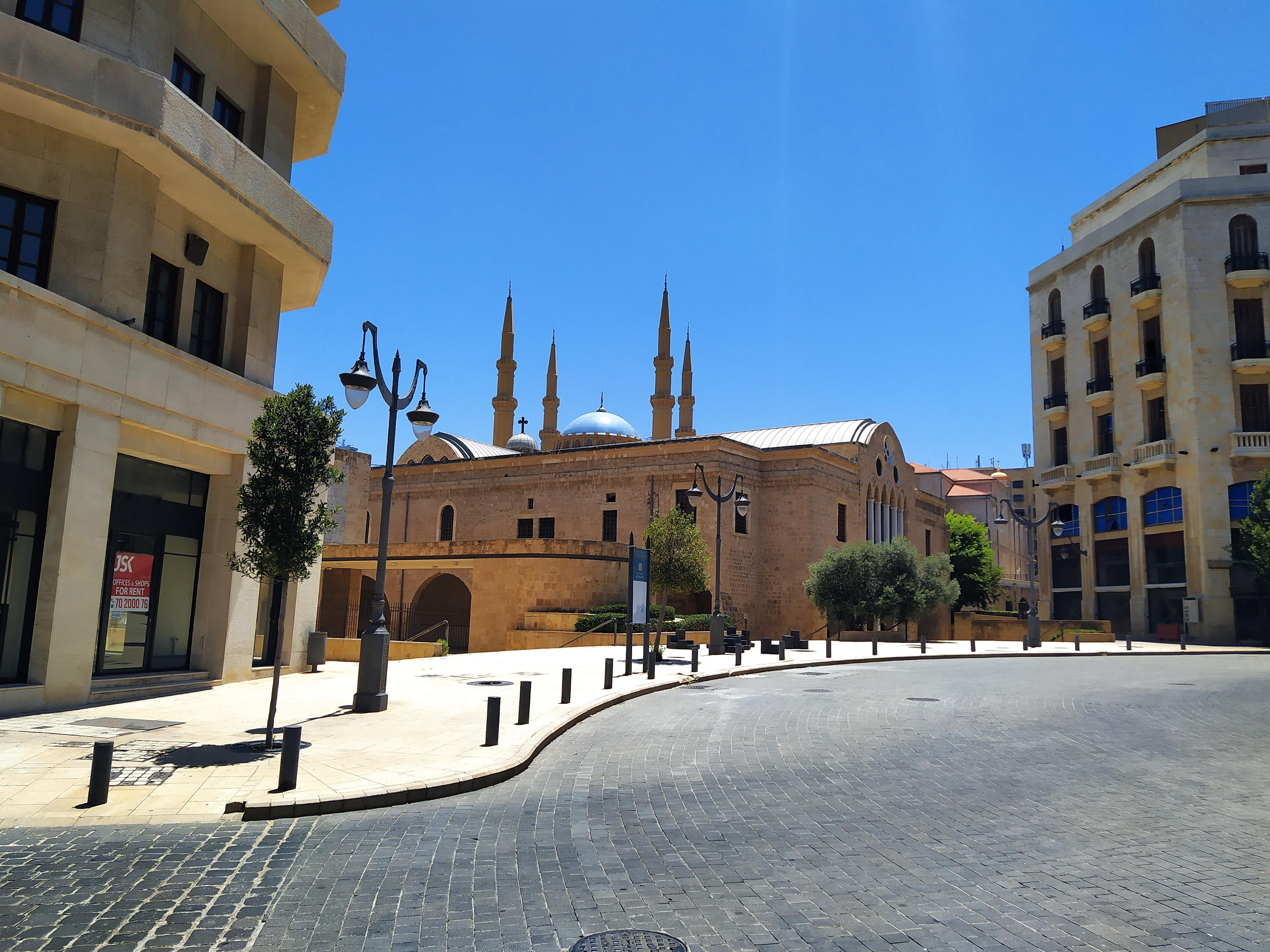
St. George Greek Orthodox Cathedral, Beirut

Lebanese Greek Orthodox Christianity is the second largest Christian denomination among the Lebanese people, representing 8% of the Lebanese population. The Greek Orthodox Church of Antioch adheres to the Eastern Orthodox Church, which is actually a group of autocephalous churches using the Byzantine rite and are the second largest Christian denomination within Christianity in Lebanon. Historically, these churches grew out of the four Eastern Patriarchates (Jerusalem, Antioch, Alexandria, and Constantinople) of the original five major episcopal sees (the Pentarchy) of the Roman Empire which included Rome. The final split took place in 1054. From that time, the Eastern Churches have continued to reject the claims of the Patriarchate of Rome (the Catholic Church) to universal supremacy and have rejected the concept of papal infallibility. Doctrinally, the main point at issue between the Eastern and Western Churches is that of the procession of the Holy Spirit and there are also divergences in ritual and discipline.

The Eastern Orthodox Christians include many free-holders, and the community is less dominated by large landowners than other Christian denominations. In present-day Lebanon, the Lebanese Greek Orthodox have become increasingly urbanized, and form a major part of the commercial and professional class of Beirut and other cities. Many are found in the Southeast (Nabatieh/Beqaa) and North, near Tripoli. They are highly educated and well-versed in finance. The church has often served as a bridge between Lebanese Christians and the Arab countries, because it exists in various parts of the Arab world. Members of the rite constitute 8% of the population.

=== Melkite Catholic ===
Melkite Christianity in Lebanon is the third-largest Christian denomination, representing 5% of the Lebanese population.

The Melkite Catholics emerged as a distinct group from 1724 when they split from the Greek Orthodox Church over a disputed election of the Patriarch of Antioch. The elected man was considered too 'pro-Roman' and another faction, the larger, elected a rival who was supported by the Orthodox patriarch in Constantinople (the see of Antioch had ignored the split between the two which occurred in 1054 and was canonically in union with both in 1724). Although they fully accept Catholic doctrines as defined by the Holy See, they have generally remained close to the Greek Orthodox Church, retaining more of the ancient rituals and customs than have the Maronites. They employ Arabic and Greek and follow the Byzantine rite.

The highest official of the church since 1930 has been the Patriarch of Antioch, who resides at Ayn Traz, about twenty-four kilometers southeast of Beirut. The patriarch is elected by bishops in a synod and confirmed by the Pope in Rome, who sends him a pallium (a circular band of white wool worn by archbishops) in recognition of their communion. Greek Catholic churches, like those of the Greek Orthodox, contain icons but no statues. The Melkite Greek Catholics live primarily in the central and eastern parts of the country, dispersed in many villages. Members of this rite are concentrated in Beirut, Zahlah, and the suburbs of Sidon. They have a relatively higher level of education than other denominations. Proud of their Arab heritage, Greek Catholics have been able to strike a balance between their openness to the Arab world and their identification with the West. Greek Catholics are estimated to constitute 5% of the population.

=== Protestantism ===
The Protestants of Lebanon form the fourth-largest Christian group, representing 1% of the Lebanese population.

Most Protestants in Lebanon were converted by missionaries, primarily English and American, during the nineteenth and twentieth centuries. They are divided into a number of Reformed denominations, including Presbyterian, Congregational, Anglican and Baptist. The Lebanese Baptist Evangelical Convention was founded in 1955 by various churches, they number around 1,600 people. Lebanese Protestant Christians are perceived by some to number disproportionately highly among the professional middle class. They constitute nearly 1 percent of the population (around 40,000) and live primarily in Beirut (Greater Beirut).

== Christian denominations among ethnic minorities ==
=== Armenian Apostolic Church ===
The Armenians in Lebanon mostly descend from refugees who had fled Turkey during and after the Armenian genocide during World War I.

The Armenian Apostolic Church was organized in the third century and became autocephalous as a national church in the fourth century. In the sixth century, it modified the formulations of the Council of Chalcedon of 451 that confirmed the dual nature of Christ in one person. Instead, the Armenian Apostolic Church adopted a form of Miaphysitism that believes in the united nature of divine and human in Christ, a belief shared by the Copts and the Syrian Orthodox Church (Oriental Orthodox Churches). The Armenian Apostolic Church has two catholicoi (Sis and Etchmiadzin Cathedral) and two patriarchs (Constantinople and Jerusalem).

The Armenians in Lebanon reside mostly in Beirut and its northern suburbs, as well as in Anjar. During the civil war, the main stance of the Armenians was not to pick a side between Muslims or Christians and stay exempt mostly from the fighting. The largest Armenian community in Lebanon is found in Bourj Hammoud.

=== Armenian Catholic Church ===
Among the Armenians in Lebanon there are some who belong to the Armenian Catholic Church. They are also refugees who had fled Turkey during and after World War I and the Armenian genocide.

=== Latin Catholic Church ===
The Latin Catholic Church in Lebanon consists mainly of a small group of Latin Catholics who are of at least partial French or Italian descent.

=== Assyrian Church of the East ===
The Assyrians in Lebanon were refugees who had fled their native lands in southeastern Turkey during and after World War I due to the Assyrian genocide. Even today, refugees continue to flee from northern Iraq into Syria, Lebanon or Jordan due to continuous unrest in Iraq.

The Archdiocese of Lebanon and Syria of the Assyrian Church of the East is based in the Mar Gewargis Church of Sad El Bouchrieh, Beirut, Lebanon. After the recent passing of the archdiocese's late Archbishop Mar Narsai D'Baz, Archbishop Mar Meelis Zaia of Australia and New Zealand temporarily took over the archdiocese, handling all church related issues in Lebanon. The current bishops, the Bishop of Europe and the Bishop of Syria, oversee their individual dioceses until a new Metropolitan is appointed.

=== Syriac Catholic Church ===
The members of the Syriac Catholic Church are also refugees who had fled southeastern Turkey (present day Mardin region) during and after World War I due to the Assyrian/Syriac genocide. Even today, refugees continue to flee from northern Iraq and northeastern Syria into Lebanon or Jordan due to continuous unrest in Iraq and Syria.

The Syriac Catholic Eparchy of Beirut is the proper archeparchy (Eastern Catholic (archdiocese) of the Syriac Catholic Church's (Antiochian Rite in Syriac language) Patriarch of Antioch in his actual seat, Beirut, Lebanon.

=== Syriac Orthodox Church ===
The members of the Syriac Orthodox Church are also refugees who had fled southeastern Turkey (present day Mardin region) during and after World War I due to the Assyrian/Syriac genocide. Even today, refugees continue to flee from northern Iraq and northeastern Syria into Lebanon or Jordan due to continuous unrest in Iraq and Syria.

There are several archdioceses and dioceses of the Syriac Orthodox Church on the territory of Lebanon. The church follows the Syriac liturgy of St. James and has an independent hierarchy under the Syriac Orthodox Patriarch of Antioch, whose seat was formerly at Mardin in Turkey and is now at Damascus, Syria.

=== Chaldean Catholic Church ===
The members of the Chaldean Catholic Church are also refugees who had fled southeastern Turkey (present day Mardin region) during and after World War I due to the Assyrian/Syriac genocide. Even today, refugees continue to flee from northern Iraq and northeastern Syria into Lebanon or Jordan due to continuous unrest in Iraq and Syria.

The Chaldean Catholic Eparchy of Beirut is the sole eparchy (Eastern Catholic diocese) of the Chaldean Catholic Church and is immediately dependent on the Chaldean Catholic Patriarch of Babylon in Baghdad, Iraq.

=== Coptic Orthodox Church ===
The Copts in Lebanon were immigrants or refugees who had fled their native lands in Egypt, Libya and Sudan.

According to tradition, the Coptic Orthodox Church of Alexandria was established by Saint Mark, an apostle and evangelist, in the middle of the 1st century (approximately AD 42). The ethnic Copts in Lebanon are estimated to number 3,000–4,000, and the Coptic Orthodox Church is one of the 18 religious sects recognized by the Lebanese Constitution.

== See also ==
- List of cathedrals in Lebanon
- Lebanese people (Maronite Christians)
- Lebanese people (Eastern Orthodox Christians)
- Lebanese people (Melkite Christians)
- Lebanese people (Protestant Christians)
- Christianity in the Middle East
- Secularism in Lebanon
- Religion in Lebanon
- Islam in Lebanon

== Sources ==
- Salibi, Kamal (1990). A House of Many Mansions: The History of Lebanon Reconsidered. Berkeley: University of California Press. ISBN 9780520071964. OCLC 18322172.
