= Lebanese Protestant Christians =

Languages
- Vernacular: Lebanese Arabic

Religion
- Christianity (Protestantism)

Lebanese Protestant Christians (Arabic: بروتستانت لبنان) refers to Lebanese people who are adherents of Protestantism in Lebanon. In 2020, studies showed that while 34.28% of the population followed Christianity; in total 1.2% of Lebanon's population were Protestant (approximately 48,000 people).

Most Protestants in Lebanon were converted by missionaries, primarily English and American, during the nineteenth and twentieth centuries. They are divided into a number of denominations, including Presbyterian, Congregational, and Anglican. They are perceived by some to number disproportionately highly among the professional middle class.

The Lebanese Protestant Christians live primarily in Beirut (Greater Beirut).

Under the terms of an unwritten agreement known as the National Pact between the various political and religious leaders of Lebanon, the Protestant community in Lebanon has one reserved seat in the Parliament of Lebanon.

== History ==
Protestant presence in Lebanon began in the early nineteenth century with the arrival of American and British missionaries. In 1819, a small group of American Presbyterians set foot in Beirut, learning Arabic and establishing their presence by 1823. These early missionaries arrived during the Ottoman Empire period under the American Board of Commissioners for Foreign Missions (ABCFM).

Pliny Fisk and Levi Parsons were the first ABCFM missionaries sent to the Levant in 1819. While their initial focus was Jerusalem, Fisk moved to Beirut and Mount Lebanon, where he died in 1825. Other early American Presbyterian missionaries included Chauncey Eddy, a pastor from New York who joined the American Board of Commissioners for Foreign Missions in 1823. His son Woodbridge and daughter-in-law Hannah began their Lebanese ministry in 1851, initially in Aleppo before relocating to the mountain village of Kfarshima and eventually to Sidon in 1857, where they replaced missionary Cornelius van Dyke, who departed to complete his translation of the Arabic Bible a text still revered by many Middle Eastern Christians. Isaac Bird and William Goodell arrived in Beirut in 1823 to establish the first permanent mission station. The mission headquarters in Beirut, known as "Burj Bird," was named after Isaac Bird.

The first Lebanese convert was Asʿad al-Shidyaq, a Maronite scholar, who encountered Jonas King. As‘ad sent theological objections to Bishop Butrus Karam, challenging icon veneration and church authority. Eventually, Patriarch Yusuf Hubaysh ordered him to cease contact with missionaries, threatening him with excommunication and political punishment. In early 1826, after agreeing to meet church authorities in the Qannoubine valley, he was detained in Maronite monasteries, where he remained under confinement for several years. Contemporary accounts describe repeated interrogations, physical punishment, and strict isolation, as well as pressure placed on his family. Despite efforts for release he died in 1830.

By the middle of the nineteenth century, Protestant institutions in the Levant had become more firmly established following official Ottoman recognition of Protestantism after Sultan Abdülmecid I issued a firman (imperial decree) that officially recognized Protestants as a separate "millet" (religious community) to enjoy the full and free exercise of their religion in 1850,.. This recognition made it legally possible to organize Protestant congregations. The earliest churches were founded in Beirut and Hasbaya, followed by others in Tripoli, Sidon, and Zahlé. Many of these congregations were led by local clergy educated in missionary seminaries, notably the Aabey Boys' Seminary, established in 1843.

== Notable people ==
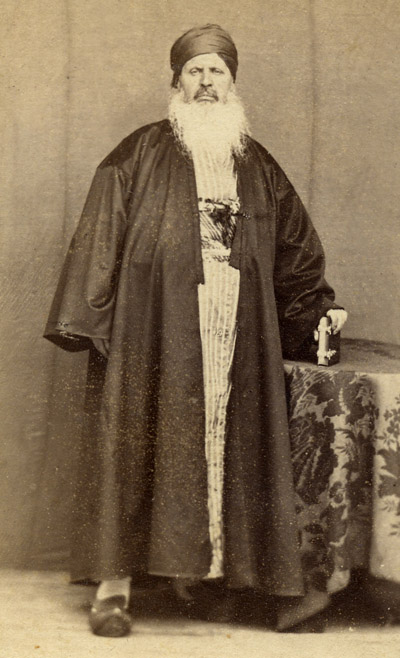
Mikhail Mishaqa

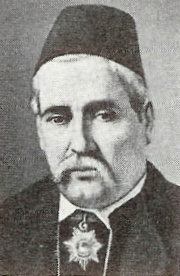
Butrus al-Bustani

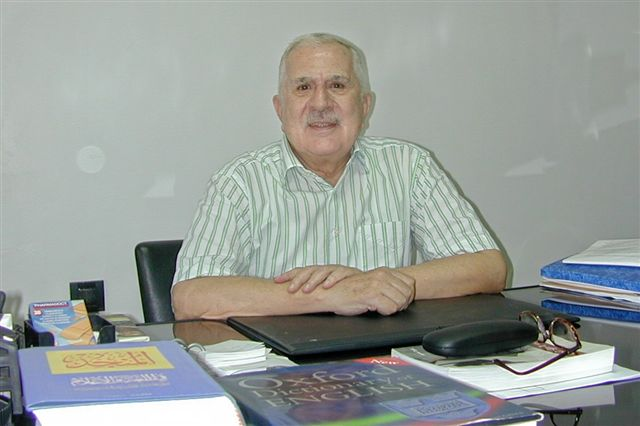
Kamal Salibi

- Butrus al-Bustani, writer and scholar
- Mikhail Mishaqa, historian
- Kamal Salibi, academic, researcher and historian
- Zachariah Anani, militia fighter
- Joseph Farah, writer
- Nick Rahall, American politician
- Abraham Mitrie Rihbany, theologian, philologist and historian
- Ayoub Tabet, former prime minister of Lebanon
- Salim Sahyouni, Protestant minister
- Wadia Sabra, composer
- Nihad Hasan, Evangelical pastor

== See also ==
- Lebanese Baptist Evangelical Convention
- National Evangelical Church of Beirut
- National Evangelical Church Union of Lebanon
- National Protestant College
- Near East School of Theology
- National Evangelical Synod of Syria and Lebanon
- Protestantism by country
