= Ilyās Farhāt =

Lebanese poet

Ilyās Farhāt (1893- 1976) was a Lebanese poet who lived and wrote in Latin America.

Ilyās Farhāt was born to a poor family in Kafarshima, Ottoman Empire in 1893. Though he hardly completed elementary education and went to work at an early age, he started writing folk poetry in colloquial Lebanese Arabic. In 1910, he emigrated to join his brothers in Brazil, where he tried to earn a living as a travelling salesman. He subsequently wrote formal poetry, gaining recognition for his first collection in 1925.

== Works ==
- Rubā'iyyāat Farhāt [The Farhāt Quartets], Brazil, 1925
- Dīwān Farhāt [Farhāt's Dīwān], Brazil, 1932. Introduction by George Hassūn Ma'lūf
- Ahlām al-rā 'ī [The Shepherd's Dream], São Paulo: Majallat al-Sharq, 1952
- Diwān Farhāt [collected poems], 4 vols., São Paulo, 1954. Introduction by Habīb Mas'ūd.
  1. Rubā'iyyāat Farhāt
  2. al-Rabī' [Spring]
  3. al-Sayf [Summer]
  4. al-Kharīf [Autumn]
- Qāla al-rāwī [The Narrator Speaks], Damascus: Syrian Ministry of Culture, 1965
- Fawākih rij'iyyah [Late Fruits], Damascus: Syrian Ministry of Culture, 1967
- Matla' al-shitā [Approach of Winter], Cairo: Maktabat al-Qāhirah, 1967
