= Layyah Barakat =

Lebanese Christian writer

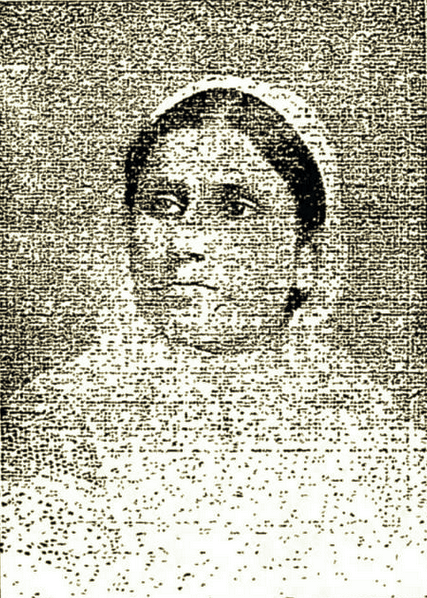
1911

Layyah Faris Anton Alkazin Barakat (circa 1858— December 4, 1940) was a Lebanese-born Christian missionary, writer, temperance activist, and prison reformer, based after 1882 in Philadelphia, Pennsylvania. She was the first Lebanese American woman to write and publish her autobiography, when A Message from Mount Lebanon was published in 1912.

== Early life ==
Layyah Faris Anton Alkazin was born in Abeih in the Double Qaim-Maqamate of Mount Lebanon. Her father died in the 1860 Mount Lebanon civil war. She was educated by German missionaries, and at an American girls' school in Beirut.

== Career ==
In Beirut and Cairo, Layya Alkazin Barakat worked with Presbyterian missionaries as a teacher. She escaped the ‘Urabi revolt in 1882 and immigrated to the United States that year, with her daughter, her husband, his brother, and other family members.

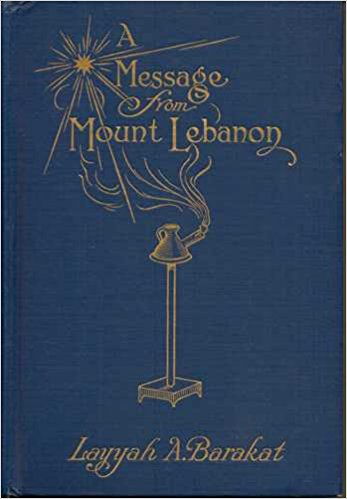
"A Message from Mount Lebanon"

In the United States Layyah Barakat took an interest in reform work, especially prison reform and temperance. She served on committees of the Pennsylvania Prison Society, touring and inspecting prisons with other concerned men and women. She was a delegate to the fourth world conference of the Woman's Christian Temperance Union in Toronto in 1897. She was "a delightful public speaker... much in demand" for women's church groups, where she was admired for her "sweet face and simple story", but also for her "fervent eloquence".

Layyah Barakat's autobiography, A Message from Mount Lebanon (1912), is believed to be the first autobiography by an Arab-American woman to be published. In 1919 she carried donated food and clothing to Syria. In 1922, a small orphanage for girls in Abeih was opened by Protestant missionaries and named after Layyah Barakat, in recognition of her fundraising work. She traveled back to her hometown to attend the opening.

== Personal life ==
Layyah Alkazin married Elias Barakat, a fellow Christian missionary in Egypt; they had three children. Elias Barakat died in 1909. Layyah Barakat died December 4, 1940, and was interred at West Laurel Hill Cemetery in Bala Cynwyd, Pennsylvania.
