= Nasri Shamseddine =

Lebanese singer and actor (1927–1983)

Nasri Shamseddine نصري شمس الدين
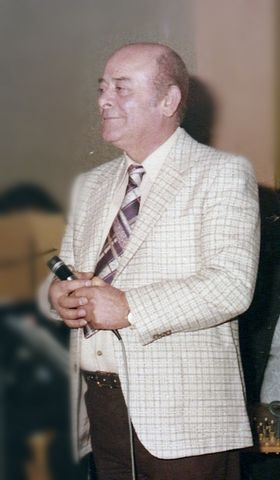

Background information
- Also known as: Nasri Chamseddine
- Born: Nasreddine Moustapha Shamesedine نصر الدين مصطفى شمس الدين; 27 June 1927; Joun, Greater Lebanon
- Died: 18 March 1983 (aged 55) Damascus, Syria
- Genre: Lebanese music
- Occupations: Singer; actor
- Instrument: Vocals
- Years active: 1957–1980
- Labels: EMI; Voix de l'Orient

Nasreddine Moustapha Shamesedine (Arabic: نصر الدين مصطفى شمس الدين; 27 June 1927 – 18 March 1983), known as Nasri Shamseddine or Chamseddine (نصري شمس الدين), was a Lebanese singer and actor.

== Biography ==
Nasreddine Moustapha Shamesedine was born in the village of Joun, in the southern part of the Chouf mountains to a Shia family.

He became a teacher of the Arabic language first in the town of Chebaa and then the Al Jaafarieh Schools in Tyre. During that time he started performing concerts singing and playing the oud. Shamseddine was first featured at the Baalbek International Festival in the early 1950s, where he also presented poems. He became not only a specialist in singing Lebanese folklore, but also in singing in different Arabic dialects. His works included collaborations with composers and singers like Melhem Barakat, Zaki Nassif, the Rahbani brothers, Halim Al-Roumi, Sabah, Wadih Al Safi, and Philemon Wehbe. Most prominently, he performed with Fairuz from 1960 until little after the beginning of the Lebanese Civil War in 1978.

Shamseddine's work consists of more than 500 songs. He held concerts in a number of countries and won awards in Brazil, France, Jordan, Lebanon, Egypt, Kuwait, and Syria.

He suffered a heart attack shortly before a concert in Damascus in 1983. Shamseddine later collapsed and died on stage during the performance due to a cardiac arrest which followed the attack.
