= Said Takieddine =

- سعيد تقي الدين
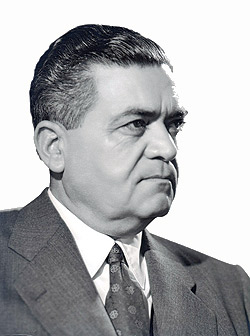
- Born: 15 May 1904; Baakleen, Lebanon
- Died: 10 February 1960 (aged 56); San Andrés, Colombia
- Education: American University of Beirut
- Occupations: Playwright, writer, journalist, activist, businessman
- Spouse: Beatrice Josephine
- Children: Diana Takieddine

Said Mahmoud Takieddine (Arabic: سعيد محمود تقي الدين; 15 May 1904 – 10 February 1960) was a Lebanese playwright, author, journalist, activist, and businessman. His plays were known to portray various political, social, and philosophical themes. He was the president of the alumni association at the American University of Beirut (AUB). He was also the dean of information and foreign affairs in the Syrian Social Nationalist Party (SSNP) for a short period.

== Early life ==
Said Takieddine was born in the Lebanese village of Baakleen in the Chouf District to a Druze family of Arabic descent. He was the son of Mahmoud Takieddine, and Zahiya Amin Abdelmalak, and had five siblings. Takieddine attended school in the Mar Antonios Monastery in Baabda, Mount Lebanon, and then moved to another school in Hadath, Lebanon, when his father was assigned another job there. He felt estranged as he was the only Druze in a school full of Christians. At the age of 16, Takieddine's love for literature and writing became evident when he published an article titled "رياضاتنا ورياضاتهم" ("Our Sports and theirs") to the front page of جريدة البرق (Al-Barq Newspaper). In the fall of 1917, Takieddine enrolled in a high school program founded by the American University of Beirut (AUB), as all schools in Lebanon and Syria were closed due to the events of World War I after his father was exiled. He then attended freshman year in the fall of 1920 at the American University of Beirut (AUB) and later graduated with a bachelor's degree in 1925.

== Personal life ==
Said Takieddine was the son of Mahmoud Takieddine, the mayor of Chouf, and Zahiya Amin Abdelmalak. He had five brothers: Khalil, Mounir, Baheej, Badʿī, and Nadeem Takieddine, and a sister, Adele Takieddine.

In April 1916, his father was arrested when his uncles, Dr. Rachid and Amin Takieddine, evaded execution and was later exiled to Anatolia. His father was then pardoned on 21 July 1918 and returned to Lebanon to become mayor of many other Lebanese cities over the years.

In 1931, during Said Takieddine's first immigration to the Philippines, he married Beatrice Josephine, a Christian Filipino woman of Arab descent whom he met in Mindanao, Philippines. Beatrice gave birth in 1933 to a daughter named Diana.

== Immigration ==
=== First immigration (9 September 1925 – 3 February 1948) ===
After graduating from university, Takieddine left Lebanon in September 1925 to start a business in Cebu, Philippines, where his uncle, Dr. Najib Takieddine, owned a house. A few weeks later, Said Takieddine, along with his uncles Fouad and Najib, started a business that relied on small boats to ship goods and display them throughout the Philippines' islands.

Said Takieddine then moved to Davao City, Mindanao, Philippines, where he and his friend, Boutros Awwad and started a few small businesses. He was then able to successfully pay back all his debts using the profits he earned from those businesses, one of which was a gas station.

In 1936, he moved to Manila, Philippines and opened a store, but he lost all his money in the stock market and declared bankruptcy, which prompted him to have suicidal thoughts. However, he then met Kamel Hamadeh, a Lebanese merchant from Baakleen, who mentored Takieddine in trading and the English language. Takieddine then started importing and reselling products from the United States, which boosted his recovery.

In 1942, the United States Armed Forces entered Manila, triggering economic and political chaos. As a result, the Philippines government arrested hundreds of Filipino citizens that had relations with the United States, Said Takieddine and Kamel Hamadeh being two of them, and incarcerated them on 21 December 1942. Upon the conquest of Manila by the United States in February 1945, Takieddine was released after being distanced from his family and sold his house to start an independent business. His father had also died during his incarceration.

Said Takieddine departed from the Philippines in February 1948 and spent about a month in Cairo, Egypt, with an estimated net worth of $300,000, and then came back to Lebanon.

=== Second immigration (9 September 1958 – 10 February 1960) ===
Takieddine had a dispute with the leaders of the Syrian Social Nationalist Party after being a member for four years, and, as a result, relinquished all party responsibilities. He then traveled to Rome, Italy, and then to Mexico, where he began suffering hemiparesis. He finally moved to San Andrés, Colombia, and, in desperate need for money after the Camille Chamoun Revolt in 1958, sold all his belongings. In his last days, he had some thoughts about going back to Lebanon but never did.

== Political activity ==
Takieddine was able to achieve financial stability between 1945 and 1948 and consequently furthered his relations with people in power. He was appointed as the Honorary Consul to the Philippines by the Lebanese Government from 6 August 1946 to 1949.

=== Membership in the Syrian Social Nationalist Party (SSNP) (1951–1958) ===
Takieddine joined the Syrian Social Nationalist Party in 1951, and, over the years, became the Dean of Information and Foreign Affairs in the party. In 1953, a series of military coups took place in Syria under the leadership of Adib Al-Shishikli and the SSNP felt its power growing. Al-Shishikli then formed a new party in Syria which the SSNP failed to be a member of, thus diminishing its member base. Then, in 1958, the SSNP pledged allegiance to Camille Chamoun during his revolt, and Takieddine consequently suspended all his activities in the party and became a non-active member.

=== Support to the Palestinian cause ===
Due to his close relation to the president of the Philippines, he was able to convince him to change the Philippines' stance in the United Nations concerning the Palestinian–Israeli conflict. Accordingly, he collected sizable donations to support the Palestinian cause and sent them to private organizations in Lebanon.

He also founded the "Kol Mowaten Khafeer" committee ("لجنة كل مواطن خفير") in 1954 to fight Zionism in Arab countries with the aid of authority figures. However, the lack of Beirut citizens' participation and support to the committee led to its disbandment in 1955.

== Bibliography ==
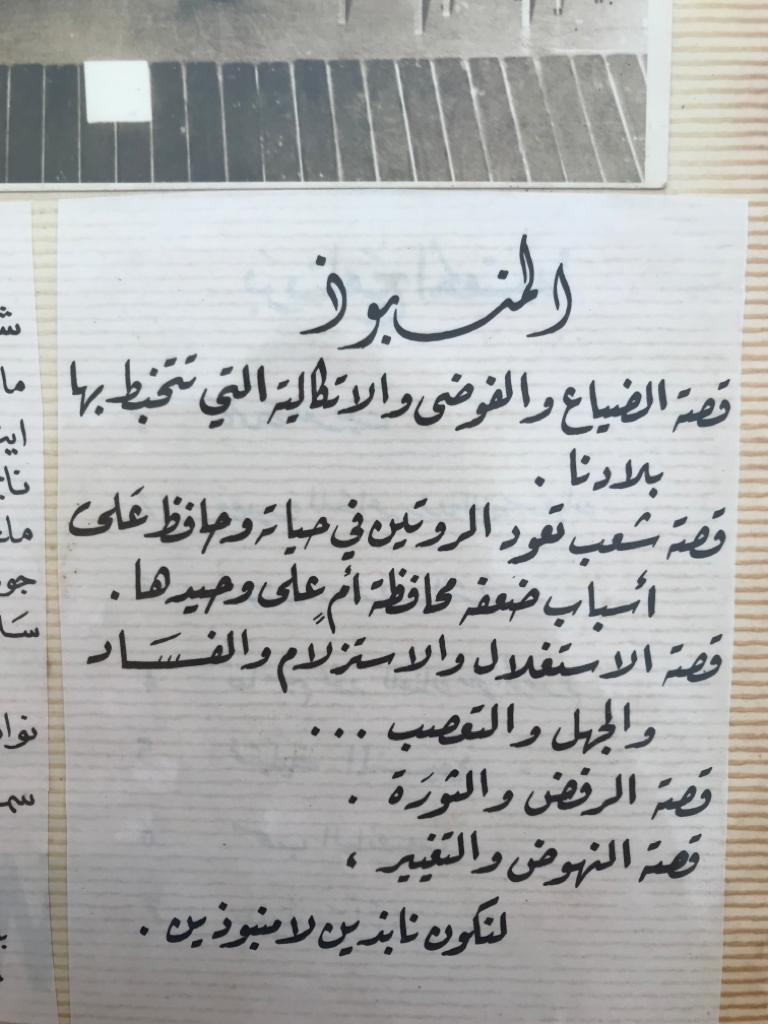
Description of one of Takieddine's plays.

=== Plays ===
- If Not for the Lawyer (1923) لولا المحامي
- It is Done (1924) قضي الأمر
- A Toast to the Enemy (1936) نخب العدو
- A Handful of Wind (1939) حفنة الريح
- The Outcast (1953) المنبوذ

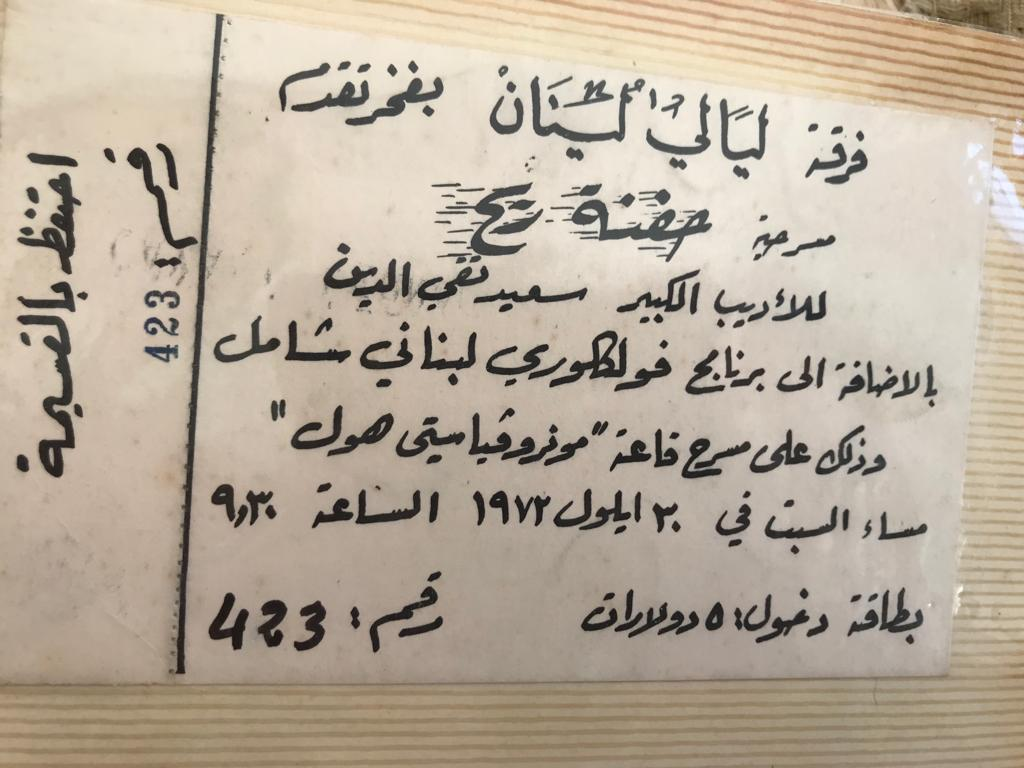
Ticket to one of Takieddine's plays.

=== Short stories ===
- Fall's Spring (1954) ربيع الخريف

=== Quote books ===
- Flap of a Wing (1954) رفة جناح

=== Speeches ===
- Ladies and Gentlemen (1955) سيدتي وسادتي

=== Articles ===
- Informed (1955) تبلغوا وبلغوا
- The Lake's Dust (1956) غبار البحيرة
- Winds in my Sail (1960) رياح في شرعي
- The Middle East (1960) الشرق الأوسط
- Frown of the Gods (2003) عبوس الألهة

=== Journals ===
- The Dragon and I (1961) أنا والتنين

== Presidency of the Alumni Association at AUB ==
Said Takieddine became President of the Alumni Association at the American University of Beirut in 1948 after its apathy in the preceding years. He also founded a building for the Alumni Association at AUB using LBP50,000 of his money.

== Death ==
On 5 February 1960, Takieddine mentioned in his final letter to a friend that he had recently suffered a heart attack. On 10 February 1960, Takieddine died of a heart attack while swimming in San Andrés, Colombia, as a result of the Hypertension disease he contracted in 1955 due to the stress he underwent in the "Kol Mowaten Khafeer" committee.
