= Nihad Hasan =

Nihad Hasan (Kurdish: Nîhad Hesen, Arabic: نهاد حسن; born 1980) is a Kurdish Christian pastor from Syria. He belongs to the Kurdish Evangelical Church and serves at a church in Beirut, Lebanon.

== Early life ==
Nihad Hasan was born in 1980. He is from the village of Kurdan in the Jindires Subdistrict near Afrin. As a young man, he was part of a Kurdish militia and first heard about Christianity during his service while listening to the radio. He began questioning religion from the age of 12 because of difficulties in his life. Nihad Hasan would later be imprisoned twice while attempting to escape Syria to Europe, with the first detention being for only 12 days, while the second one was for six months. He claimed that during his second detention, he felt the Holy Spirit while in solitary confinement, and accepted Christianity in 2008, leading other prisoners to accuse him of apostasy. He later escaped prison with the help of a sympathetic guard, after which he fled to Lebanon and immediately began studying to become a pastor.

== Career ==
After having accepted Christianity in prison in Damascus in 2008 and fleeing to Lebanon, Nihad Hasan graduated from the "Arabic Baptist Theological School" in Beirut in 2017, officially becoming a pastor. He belonged to the Kurdish Evangelical Church and led a church in Beirut, and also served congregations outside Beirut in Ferzol, Qabb Ilyas, and Zahlé. Most of his followers were Syrian Kurds. He would often include Kurdish advocacy while preaching Christianity. He also provided religious and humanitarian services in Lebanon and Syria. His family had joined him in Lebanon after the Syrian civil war, and while they generally opposed his conversion to Christianity, some of them had also converted.

== Arrest and release ==
While based in Lebanon, he would occasionally visit Syria, and had even visited after the fall of Assad in June 2026. However, on July 19, during one of his routine visits, he was arrested near Afrin on charges of "religious incitement" over a Facebook post attributed to him which was deemed offensive to Muslims. He was eventually released on August 7 after serving two weeks in jail. He was held in the Afrin Central Civil Prison.

== Reactions ==
The Kurdish Evangelical Church in Beirut and the Assyrian Observatory for Human Rights condemned the arrest and called for his release. Tom Harb, the Lebanese director of the US Middle East Coalition, called on the US government to pressure the Syrian government for his release. The US-based Christian Emergency Alliance claimed that Nihad Hasan was actually arrested for speaking against the plight of the Kurds in Afrin rather than a Facebook post, while the Kurdish Evangelical Church claimed it was to counter the rise of Christianity among Kurds in Syria. The director of the Assyrian Observatory for Human Rights, Cemil Diyarbekirli, stated that he contacted Nihad Hasan who was released "after tireless efforts and follow-ups", and additionally called for the release of all Christians unfairly detained in Syria. Nihad Hasan was reported to have returned to Beirut on August 7.
