= Az-Zuhur (magazine) =

Egyptian literary and arts magazine

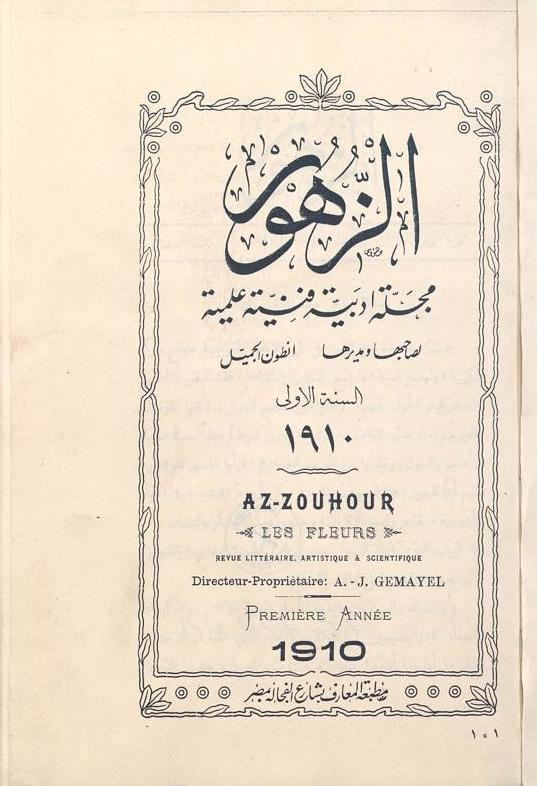
- Editor: Anṭūn al-Ǧumayyil
- Categories: Art, literature
- Frequency: Monthly
- First issue: March 1910
- Final issue: December 1913
- Country: Egypt
- Based in: Cairo
- Language: Arabic

Az-Zuhur (Arabic: الزهور / ALA-LC: Al-Zuhūr / DMG: az-Zuhūr, 'The Flowers') was a monthly journal published in Cairo from 1910 until 1913. Altogether, 40 issues exist. The editor Anṭūn al-Ǧumayyil (1887-1948) did already participate in the publication of the Beiruti magazine Al-Bashir and the Egyptian newspaper Al-Ahram.

Literature and art were the main focus whereat the journal mainly tried to support young authors and to improve the relationship between Arab writers from different regions. In addition, editors of Az-Zuhur wanted to keep the balance between European and contemporary Arabic literature like some other later popular journals.

Beside literary criticism, book reviews and news about the literary life in Egypt, the authors stand up for the establishment and enhancement of the Egyptian theatre. Az-Zuhur was the first journal to publish in its series a play of Shakespeare, Julius Caesar. Until the cut-off in 1913 the journal organized numerous writing competitions which helped to achieve more popularity. Eventually Az-Zuhur was able to add a significant contribution to the Egyptian literary life.
