= Collège Protestant Français =

Collège Protestant Français (CPF) is a French Protestant Christian international school in Chouran, Beirut, Lebanon. It serves levels petite section through terminale (final year of lycée, or senior high school/sixth form college).

The school was founded after World War I, in application of the treaty of Versailles, when the German Protestant orphanage college called the Diakonissen von Kaiserswerth, which was founded in 1862, was handed over to Protestant Federation of France. The school opened its doors in 1927, to 100 students, and the principal Louise Wegmann, from the Alsace-Lorraine region of France. Wegmann ran the school for more than 30 years.

CPF was originally located in downtown Beirut in what later became the STARCO. In 1956, it relocated to the district of Chouran in Ras Beirut, on Rue Madame Curie, where a facility was erected designed by the architects Michel Ecochard and Claude Lecoeur. CPF was a school where children from all different religions and creeds were welcomed, and diversity was encouraged and protected.

As of 2017, CPF had 1,725 students.
