= Sami Ibrahim Haddad =

Lebanese doctor, surgeon and writer

Sami Ibrahim Haddad M.D., I.S.S., F.A.C.S., G.M.B.
- Arabic: سامي ابراهيم حداد
- Born: July 3, 1890; Jaffa, Palestine
- Died: February 5, 1957 (aged 66); Beirut, Lebanon
- Occupations: Doctor, Surgeon

Sami Ibrahim Haddad, Arabic: سامي ابراهيم حداد (July 3, 1890 – February 5, 1957) was a doctor, surgeon and writer. He was born in Palestine and spent most of his life in Lebanon.

== Life ==
He completed preparatory education at the Bishop Gobat School (1901–1905) and the English College (1907–1909) in Jerusalem. This left an indelible mark on him. His assertiveness, honesty, discipline, and austerity most probably derived from his early Scottish high school teachers in Jerusalem, where he earned the Gibbon Memorial Prize in July 1906. He graduated with a Medical Doctor (MD) degree from the Syrian Protestant College (SPC) in 1913. For seven years after graduation (1913–1919), he practiced general medicine and public health, and taught the basic medical sciences at SPC. In 1919, he was nominated physician in charge of the Mental Disease Hospital at Asfuriyeh. When the U.S. King-Crane Commission (created by President Woodrow Wilson to poll public opinion in Syria, Lebanon and Palestine) arrived in Beirut, he became its physician and interpreter. He was awarded a Rockefeller fellowship to go to Johns Hopkins University (JHU) and Columbia University from 1921 to 1922 where he specialized in surgery and urology. His first son Farid was born in New York during that trip. One of his mentors in urology was the famous urologist at JHU, Dr. Hugh Hampton Young.

Sami I. Haddad was appointed adjunct professor of surgery at the SPC. Founded in 1866 by the American missionaries in Beirut (Lebanon), the SPC was renamed in 1920 as the American University of Beirut. Dr. Sami I Haddad worked at AUB until 1947, as professor of surgery and urology, chairman of the surgery department, and dean of the medical school.

== Medical Research ==
He became a member of the International Society for Surgery in 1931, a Fellow of the American College of Surgeons in 1934, a member of the Council of AUB, and in 1941, chairman of AUB's department of surgery and dean of its medical school. He was awarded the Lebanese Honorary Golden Order of Merit both in 1954 and 1956.

He was proficient in Arabic and English and learned French, German and Syriac for his archival research in history. He wrote almost a hundred articles on various medical topics including general surgery, and urology, half of them in English and half in Arabic. Ten of his books were written in English, including Notes on Embryology (unpublished), Essentials of Urinary and Genital Disease (1946), and eight volumes of the Annual Report of the Orient Hospital (AROH) (1948–1955). The Contributions of the Arabs to the Medical Sciences (1936) and The Tradition According to Omar (1940) were written in Arabic. His articles on urology dealt with cystoscopy, pyolography, hematuria, genitourinary tuberculosis, renal and ureteral lithiasis, hemangioma of the urinary bladder, calculi, prostatic enlargement, and prostatic cancer.

He also published articles on various forms of cancers, and the art of surgery. His research on the history of medicine resulted in articles on hospitals in the Arab world, Ibn al-Nafis (the 19th-century physician who discovered pulmonary circulation), Hippocrates, Galen, Arab dentistry, cesarean section, medical ethics, medical biographies, and a catalogue of the Arabic medical manuscripts he had collected. He also wrote the history of Arabic script, the medical problems in Arab countries, and the Mameluke documents concerning the church of the Nativity in Jerusalem.

== Orient Hospital of Beirut ==
In 1947, he left AUB and founded the Orient Hospital, a fifty-four bed non-profit institution that provided free medical care to hundreds of Palestinians made refugees by the creation of the state of Israel. He shouldered the responsibility of the Orient Hospital's varied and intricate administration. "He was its founder, superintendent, chief of staff, chief surgeon, roentgenologist, record keeper, and editor of its Annual Report."

He bought a house on the same block as the Orient Hospital, in a district of downtown Beirut called Haouz Saatiyeh, where he spent the last ten years of his life. With his wife Lamia, they had 6 children: Farid (urologist and surgeon), Fuad (neurosurgeon), Brahim (engineer), Samia (pianist), Labib (mathematician) and Saad (physicist and architect). His second son Dr. Fuad Sami Haddad was "...the founder of modern neurosurgery in Lebanon."

== Death ==
Sick with heart disease the last five years of his life, he died on February 5, 1957, in Beirut. At the funeral, his students carried his coffin to the National Evangelical Church of Beirut.
