= Shoushou =

Lebanese actor, singer and comedian

Hassan Alaa Eddin (Arabic: حسن علاء الدين), commonly known as Shoushou or Chouchou (Arabic: شوشو) (26 February 1939 – 2 November 1975), was a Lebanese actor/singer/comedian.

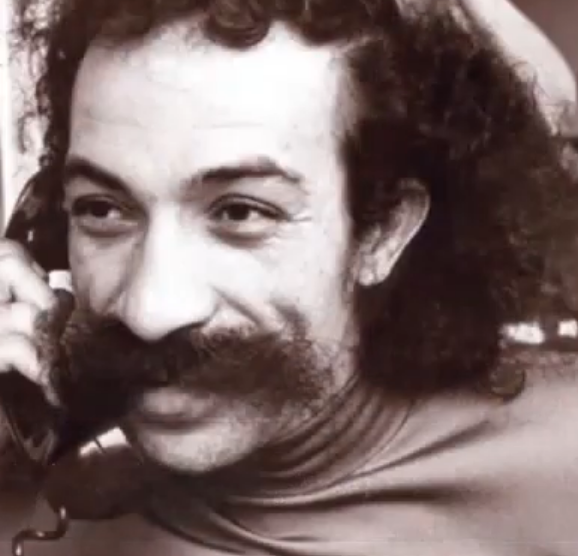

Born in Joun, he founded the national theater, and wrote and played in many TV movies. He also composed and sang children's songs and wrote such plays as Alef B Boubeye, Shehadin Ya Baladna and Nana il Hilwe.

Google celebrated Shoushou by placing a doodle on its homepage on February 26, 2014, to mark the 75th anniversary of his birth.

== Death ==
Hassan Alaa Eddin died, aged 35, from a heart disease.
