= Shibli Shumayyil =

Lebanese doctor

Shibli Shumayyil (Arabic: شبلي شميل; 1850–1917) was a Lebanese doctor who published on topics such as Islamic socialism and social Darwinism in leading Arabic-language journals of his day.

== Early life and education ==
Shibli Shumayyil was born in 1850 to a Greek Catholic family in Kfarshima, Lebanon. After leaving Kfarshima, Shumayyil would go to the Syrian Protestant College in Beirut.

== Career ==
Trained as a doctor at college, he would practice in Tanta for a decade before moving to Cairo. In Cairo, he would continue practicing as a doctor, and, in 1886, he would start a medical journal called Al-Shifa. This journal would fail five years later, though he would write for other journals, such as al-Muqtataf.

== Politics ==
Shumayyil classed himself as a socialist Darwinist. This included his argument that rather than competition, that man relied on cooperation to progress. As part of his socialist beliefs, Shumayyil thought that the government should guarantee employment, provide education, medical care, and control wages. He also advocated against the current legal system and advocated for its removal.

Historian Fawaz Gerges describes Shumayyil as "an ardent proponent of Darwinism, materialism, and socialism" and names him as a key contributor to influential scientific journals of his time.

== Death ==
Shumayyil died in January 1917.
