= Joseph Harb =

Lebanese poet and writer

Joseph Harb (1940 – 9 February 2014) was a Lebanese poet and writer.

== Awards & honors ==
- The Lebanese Literature Award
