= Issam Rajji =

Issam Rajji عصام رجي

Background information
- Birth name: Issam Rajji
- Born: 1944; Kfarshima, Lebanon
- Died: 2001 (aged 56–57)
- Genres: Lebanese music
- Years active: 1970s–2001

Issam Rajji (Arabic: عصام رجي) (born 1944 in Kfarshima, died 2001 Lebanon) was a Lebanese singer, lyricist and composer most prominent during the 1970s and 80s.

== Early life ==
Issam Rajji began his artistic career, working backstage for the television program "Art is Two Hobbies". He was later introduced to the Rahbani brothers and worked with them in the choir. In 1965, the Lebanese artist Romeo Lahoud starred alongside him in the play "Mawal", as a supporting actor. After starring in first official play performance, he later star in more than 25 theatrical and musical works.

== Later life ==
Rajji went to Jordan for a while during the Lebanese civil war and married a Jordanian woman Nawal Elias and had three children with her Layal, Rami and Sariya. He and his family also lived in Oman for a long period of time but then returned permanently to Lebanon in 1993 after the civil war. He died in 2001 of a stroke after having a brain seizure.

When once asked about how he felt about dying, Rajji replied:“I hate death because it would separate me from the people I love.”

== Career ==
Best known for his songs "Lagetek" ("When I Met You...") and "Yawmain wa Shahrain" ("Two Days and Two Months"), Raiji also earned roles in Lebanon's top musicals and plays in the 1970s and 1980s with the Rahbani brothers, Sabah, Shoushou and Nabih Aboulhosn.

Rajji was a composer, and beside writing a great deal of his own music, he also wrote for Sabah "Laylitna Saidi" ("Happy is our Night") and "Ya Nas Dinyi Doulab" ("Oh People, Life is like a Wheel"). For Samir Yazbek, he penned "al-Oyoun Assoud" ("Black Eyes") and "Dakhlak Berdan" ("I Feel Cold")
