= Lebanese Order of Physicians =

Founded on December 7, 1946, the Lebanese Order of Physicians in Beirut is a medical organization and physician group in Lebanon. Its membership aims to pursue and promote optimal healthcare system and policies in Lebanon thus the region. Physicians apply scientific knowledge and clinical expertise to the diagnosis, treatment, and compassionate care of adults across the spectrum from health to complex illness.

== Role ==
The Lebanese Order of Physicians’ mission is a medical, healthy, scientific, administrative, and a guiding mission that aims to:

1. Unify the doctors’ word, defend their rights, maintain their legitimate moral and material interests, raise the level of their profession, and ensure the ethics and dignity of the medical care.
2. Discipline doctors to its laws and to the medical ethics.
3. Express an opinion and make suggestions for laws and regulations related to the profession of medicine and health agreements.
4. Express an opinion in sending medical missions and in attending international health conferences.
5. Coordinate with government institutions, especially with the Ministries of Public Health and Environment, to take the correct and useful decisions in the issues related to public health, and the formulation of national health policies.
6. Provide suggestions on the medical curriculum in colleges and institutes of medicine in Lebanon, and ensure the professional eligibility of physicians.
7. Contribute along with local and international institutions to defend human rights in health issues.
8. Coordinate with the Ministries of Public Health and Media on all matters related to public medical information and medical programs of any kind.
9. Express an opinion in the organization of the professions of assistance in the field of medicine.
10. Develop a manual on doctor fees.
11. Seek to solve the disputes that might occur among physicians or between them and their patients.
12. Help the doctors, or their families’, that are in need or with disabilities, and establish a retirement (pension) fund for aging and disability insurance.
13. Put a self-health insurance for the medical entity, and establish a synergistic fund for this purpose.

== Presidents ==
Position	Photo	Name	Duration
1		Raif Abi Al-Lamaa	1947–1948
2		Mohamad Haidar	1949–1950
3		Joseph Al-Feghali	1951–1952
4		Najib Saad	1953–1954
5		Philip Chedid	1955–1956
6		Najib Saad	1957–1958
7		Antoine Hasri	1959–1960
8		Afif Mfarrej	1961–1962
9		Philip Chedid	1963–1964
10		Afif Mfarej	1965–1966
11		Antoine Honein	1967–1968
12		Farid Haddad	1969–1970
13		Antoine Honein	1971–1972
14		Joseph Azar	1973–1974
15		Fouad Al-Chemali	1975–1987
16		Michel Salhab	1988–1989
17		Mounir Rahme	1990–1991
18		Fouad Al-Boustani	1992–1995
19		Faek Youness	1995–1998
20		Ghattas Al-Khoury	1998–2001
21		Mahmoud Choucair	2001–2004
22		Mario Aoun	2004–2007
23		Georges Aftimos	2007–2010
24		Charaf Abou Charaf	2010–2013
25		Antoine Boustany	2013–2016
26		Raymond Sayegh	2016 - 2019
27		Charaf Abou Charaf	2019-

== Branches ==
- Baalback
- Bekaa
- Jounieh
- Nabatieh
- Saida

== Committees ==
Media & Communication Committee

Scientific Committee

Administrative Committee
