= Aabey =

Aabey عبيه Abey
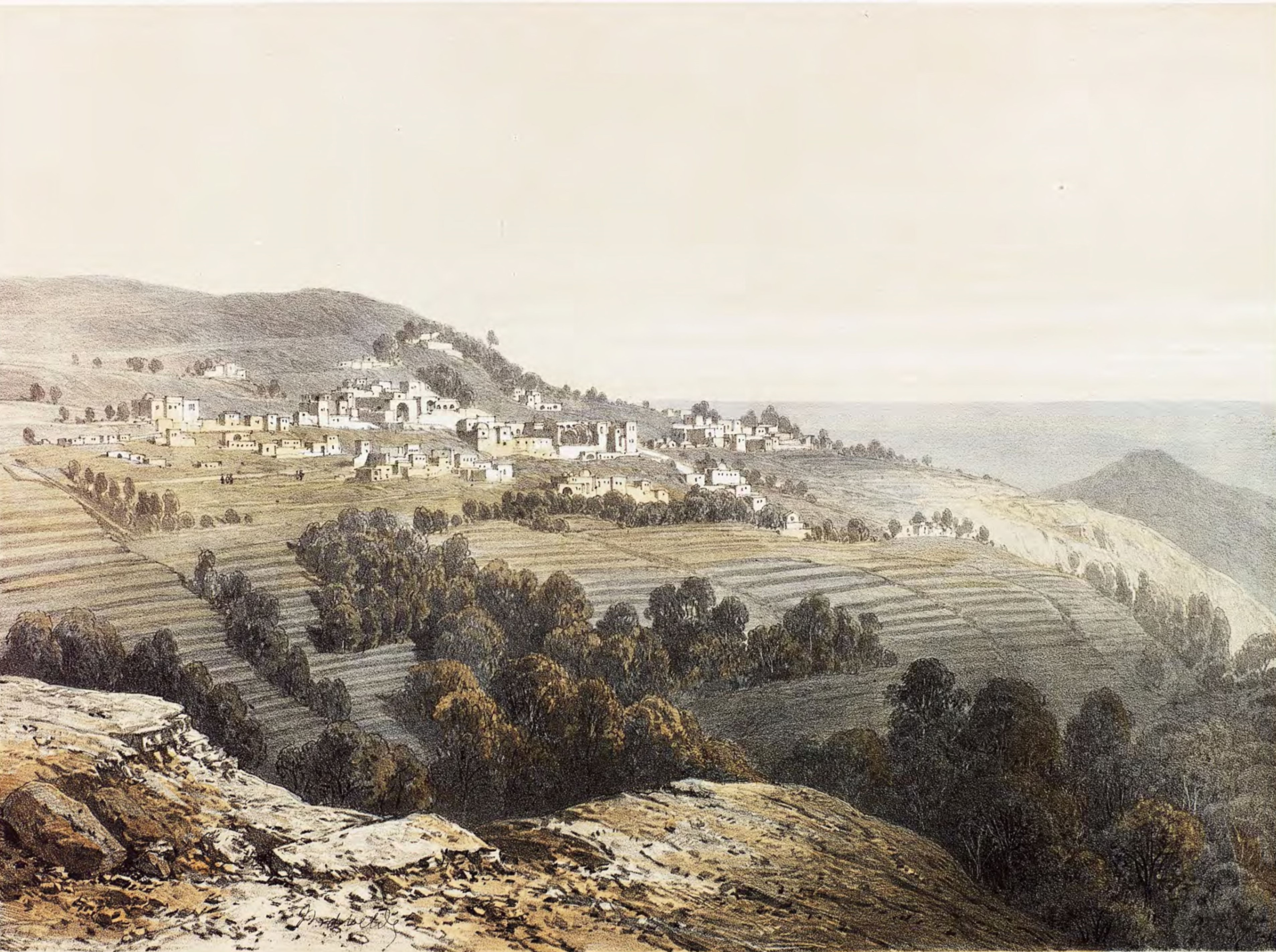
- Aabey, ca 1851, by van de Velde

- Location in Lebanon
- Coordinates: 33°44′13.18″N 35°31′32.70″E
- Country: Lebanon
- Governorate: Mount Lebanon Governorate
- District: Aley District
- Elevation: 2,600 ft (800 m)

Population
  - Total: 4,000
- Time zone: UTC+2 (EET)
  - Summer (DST): +3

Aabey, also spelled Abey (Arabic: عبيه), is a village located in Mount Lebanon, in Aley District of Mount Lebanon Governorate. It is located 22 km (14 mi) from Beirut and has an altitude of 800 m (2,600 feet). It is bordered by Kfarmatta (South), Al Bennay (East), Damour (West), and Ain Ksour (North). It overlooks Damour and the capital Beirut and the sea can be seen from virtually any point in the village. Aabey contains the Dawdye college, Aabey Vocational School (Mihanye) etc.

== Etymology ==
The name Aabey (Arabic: عبيه) comes from the Aramaic word meaning “abundant."

== History ==
During the Fatimid and the Mamluk periods, Tanukh settled in Aabey. The Tanukh emirs (Buhturids) were cavalry officers in a special regiment of the Mamluk army that conquered Beirut in 1291, led by Sultan al-Ashraf Khalil. The emirs established their summer residence in Aabey, where the remains of several buildings can still be seen today. Among the monuments left by this feudal dynasty is the Fountain of Emirs, the residence of Emir Qa'an At-Tannoukhi (17th-18th centuries), the residence of Sheikh Riad Amine Eddine, and the restored Druze tomb (Maqam) of the revered Druze theologian Sayid Abdallah at-Tannukhi (died 1479), who is credited with uniting the Druze of the Chouf mountains.

Notable churches include the Church of as-Saydeh, Church of Mar Sarkis and Bakhos, Church of Mar Maroun, and the Evangelical Church founded by European missionaries in the 17th century. During the early 19th century, American Protestant missionaries began arriving in Beirut. The Druze, unlike their Maronite and Greek Orthodox contemporaries, welcomed the establishment of schools in their villages. In 1839 the missionaries established a medical centre in Aabey. in 1843 W.M. Thomson and Cornelius Van Alen Van Dyck came to live in the village and set up a boys seminary. In his The Land and the Book, Thomson gives a vivid account of the village being overrun by an invasion of locusts which lasted four days. In 1838, Eli Smith noted the village, called 'Abeih , located in El-Ghurb el-Fokany, upper el-Ghurb.

During the 1915 locust infestation, Aabey suffered a significant loss of vegetation, with its surroundings reportedly left barren by the swarms.

== Notables ==
Melkite Archbishop Grégoire Haddad, later known as the "Red Bishop of Beirut", was born in Aabey. Surgeon Sami Ibrahim Haddad (born in Jaffa, Palestine) was originally from Aabey; he returned and founded the Orient Hospital which was later run by his sons Dr Farid Haddad and Dr Fuad Haddad who were both born in the village. Gregory IV of Antioch (born Ghantus Haddad) patriarch of the Greek Orthodox Patriarchate of Antioch, was born in Aabey in 1859. Presbyterian missionary Layyah Barakat was born in Aabey, and returned in 1922 to open an orphanage for girls there.

Aabey is the seat of the house of Al Nakadi, a Druze feudal family in Mount Lebanon. Ιn 1845 part of the Nakadi family, namely sheikh Qasim and his brothers Salim and Said, left Deir al-Qamar and relocated to Aabey.

Aabey is the birthplace of Fuad Hamza who served as the personal adviser of King Abdulaziz, the founder of Saudi Arabia. He was granted Saudi nationality and was appointed as a Saudi ambassador to France and the United States, as well as Saudi deputy minister for foreign affairs. One of his famous books is "Al-Bilad Al-Arabia Al-Saudia".

== Families of Aabey ==
The main families in Aabey are: Hamza, Halabi, Haddad, Hassan, Abdel Wili, Amaneldine, Ataya, Faraj, Jamal, Jaber, Nakadi, Nasr, Kuntar, Ghrayeb, Khoury, Kanaan, Raydan, Shreety, Timani and Wehbe.

== Bibliography ==
- Robinson, E.; Smith, E. (1841). Biblical Researches in Palestine, Mount Sinai and Arabia Petraea: A Journal of Travels in the year 1838. Vol. 3. Boston: Crocker & Brewster.
