= Kfarshima =

Town in Mount Lebanon Governorate, Lebanon

Kfarshima كفرشيما
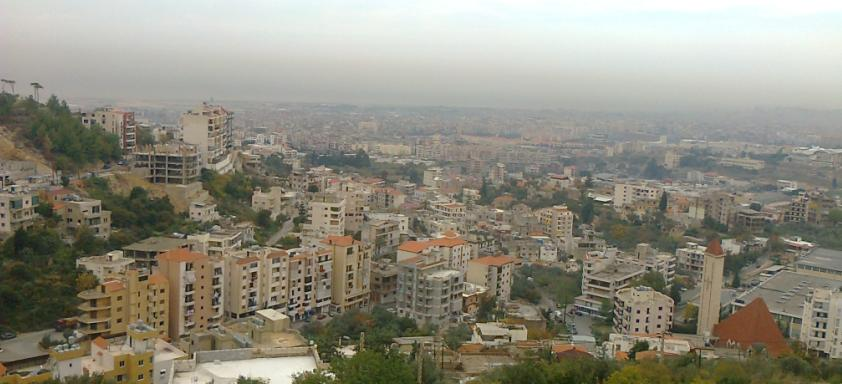

- Location in Lebanon
- Coordinates: 33°48′55″N 35°32′0″E
- Country: Lebanon
- Governorate: Mount Lebanon Governorate
- District: Baabda District
- Time zone: UTC+2 (EET)
  - Summer (DST): +3

Kfarshima (Arabic: كفرشيما), also spelled Kfarchima, is a town in the Baabda District of the Mount Lebanon Governorate, southeast of Beirut and is part of Greater Beirut. The town is populated by Lebanese Christians: mainly Melkite Greek Catholic and Maronites, with smaller communities of Greek Orthodox and Protestant Evangelical Christians. Kfarshima was subject to heavy bombing during the Lebanese civil war since it was a primary fault line.

Kfarshima is the birthplace of the composers musicians and singers, Philemon Wehbi, Halim el-Roumi and Melhem Barakat, and the singers Marie Sleiman, and Majida El Roumi. Also the Birthplace of the Philosopher Shibli Shumayyil (Chibli Chemayel). It was also the hometown for Lebanese singer Issam Rajji.

In 2023, Amir Hlayyil, ethnographer and poet from Kfarshima, translated in Lebanese the final excerpt from James Joyce's "Ulysses", published in 2024 in Göttingen by Vandenhoeck & Ruprecht Verlage.

== Schools ==
- Eastwood College
- Ecole Saint Maxime
- Lycée Adonis
- Ecole Notre Dame Des Soeurs Antonine
- Kfarshima Official Middle School
- Kfarshima Official High School
- National Protestant College

== Churches ==
There are seven churches in Kfarchima:

- The Greek Orthodox church St. Peter & Paul, in Al-Mahatta.
- Three Maronite Churches: St. Elias in Balouh, New Lady of the Rosary in Sahet-al-Ain and the Old Lady of the Rosary in Ain-al-Rouhban.
- The Evangelical Church in Haret-al-Majjadin.
- The St. Takla Church for the Catholics located in Sahet-al-Ain.
- The St. Antoine Church (Also called 'Deir Al Karkafi') located in Haret-al-Deir.

== Notable residents ==
- Ilyās Farhāt, poet
- Saleem Takla, co-founder of Al-Ahram
- Shibli Shumayyil
- Hanna K. Korany
