= Orient Hospital =

- Orient Hospital Logo

Geography
- Location: Beirut, Lebanon
- Coordinates: 33.901814°N 35.492437°E (approximate)

Organisation
- Type: Community

Services
- Beds: 54

History
- Opened: 1947
- Closed: 1976

Links
- Lists: Hospitals in Lebanon

The Orient Hospital (Arabic: مستشفى الشرق) was a Lebanese non-profit hospital located in Beirut and maintained for the care of low-income patients. It was founded in 1947 by Dr. Sami Ibrahim Haddad, a well-known physician and historian of medicine. It closed in 1976 during the Lebanese Civil War.

== Location and description ==
The 54-bed hospital overlooked Saint George Bay in Beirut. The main structure was a renovated five-story building with a newly built annex for nurses. The ground floor consisted of admissions, a reception hall enclosed by consultation offices, a medical laboratory and an OPD. The second floor was contained surgical beds and the third floor housed the medical patients. The fourth floor consisted of a single operating theater and its sterilizing equipment as well as an adjacent 50-seat lecture hall. The fifth floor, surrounded by a terrace, served as living quarters for interns.

The hospital had four departments, urology and urosurgery, neuro-surgery, obstetrics and radiology. External specialists were allowed to admit and operate upon their patients at the hospital.

It also had a superlative library containing a great number of manuscripts on a wide range of subjects such as Arabic medicine, biology, religion, numismatics, history, literature and Arabic geometry and astronomy. The collection, including the Annual Reports of the Orient Hospital, is now in the Sami Ibrahim Haddad Memorial Library.

== Final years ==
The hospital was run and administered by its founder, Sami Ibrahim Haddad, until his death in 1957 and then by his sons, Dr. Farid Sami Haddad and Dr. Fuad Sami Haddad. The Orient Hospital closed its doors in 1976, at the beginning of the Lebanese Civil War. It was later demolished by its owners to prevent gunmen occupying it, as it was in the heavily fought over area of downtown Beirut.
