= Riad Jarjour =

Syrian clergyman

Reverend Riad Jarjour
- رياض جرجور

Personal life
- Born: Aleppo, Syria
- Education: Hagazian College; Near East School of Theology

Religious life
- Religion: Christianity
- Denomination: National Evangelical Synod of Syria and Lebanon

Riad Jarjour (Arabic: رياض جرجور) (born 1948) is a Syrian Christian clergyman who served as General Secretary of the Middle East Council of Churches between 1994 and 2003. He was born in Aleppo and grew up in the city of Homs.

He is associated with the Presbyterian Church.

== Biography ==
While in high school, he spent a year in Green Bay, Wisconsin as an exchange student. He completed his B.A. degree at Hagazian College and M.Div. at the Near East School of Theology, both in Beirut, Lebanon, and in 1978 was ordained a minister in the Evangelical Synod of Syria and Lebanon.

Further studies include an STM degree in Islamic studies from the Near East School of Theology, and a D.Min. degree at McCormick Theological Seminary, Chicago, Ill. A chaplain in South Lebanon for several years, he joined the Middle East Council of Churches (MECC) in 1978 as Director of the Youth Program, and in 1983 became co-director, with his wife, Roseangela, of the Ayia Napa Conference Center in Ayia Napa, Cyprus. Roseangela went on to become General Secretary of the Fellowship of Middle East Evangelical Churches.

In 1985 he was named Associate General Secretary of the MECC and Director of its Unit on Education and Renewal. The MECC became increasingly involved in Christian-Muslim dialogue under the Rev. Jarjour's leadership.

Jarjour is the general secretary of the Arab Group for Muslim-Christian Dialogue.

In 2024 he is the president of the Forum for Development, Culture and Dialogue.

== Legacy ==
During his nine-year tenure with the MECC, Jarjour brought the council's program closer to the grass roots of the churches, and rationalized its structure. He maintained the council's ministries despite shrinking financial resources. He also worked to strengthen the ministry of the council among its member churches and especially in the Holy Land. He supported the cause of the Palestinian people, and advocated for the preservation of the Arab identity of Jerusalem.

He has organized and led several events like the Muslim-Christian conference on Jerusalem (Beirut, June 14–17, 1996). Over the years, the council's role as the venue for communication between middle eastern Christians and Muslims was enhanced. Jarjour was among the contributors to and editors of the landmark document of the Arab Working Group for Christian Muslim Dialogue, “Dialogue and Coexistence: An Arab Muslim-Christian Covenant” (finalized in Cairo in December 2001).

Jarjour was instrumental in planning and administering an important meeting between the heads of the Middle East's churches (Council of Nicosia). Under his administration, the council's relief work in Iraq continued to be effective. The council was also on the ground to respond to the 1997 earthquake in Iran. He administered the program on Justice, Peace and Human Rights which evolved into an effective instrument for analysis, training and promoting the concerns not only of Christians but of all groups in middle eastern society.

Jarjour led the Arab Group for Christian-Muslim Dialogue on activities in the region and internationally, which culminated in an important document on Christian Muslim dialogue (The Christian Muslim covenant). He also developed the activities of the World Association for Christian Communication in the Middle East during his time as director.

He contributed an essay to the publication, Who are the Christians in the Middle East.
