= Sani Ibrahim Azar =

Bishop of The Evangelical Lutheran Church in Jordan and the Holy Land

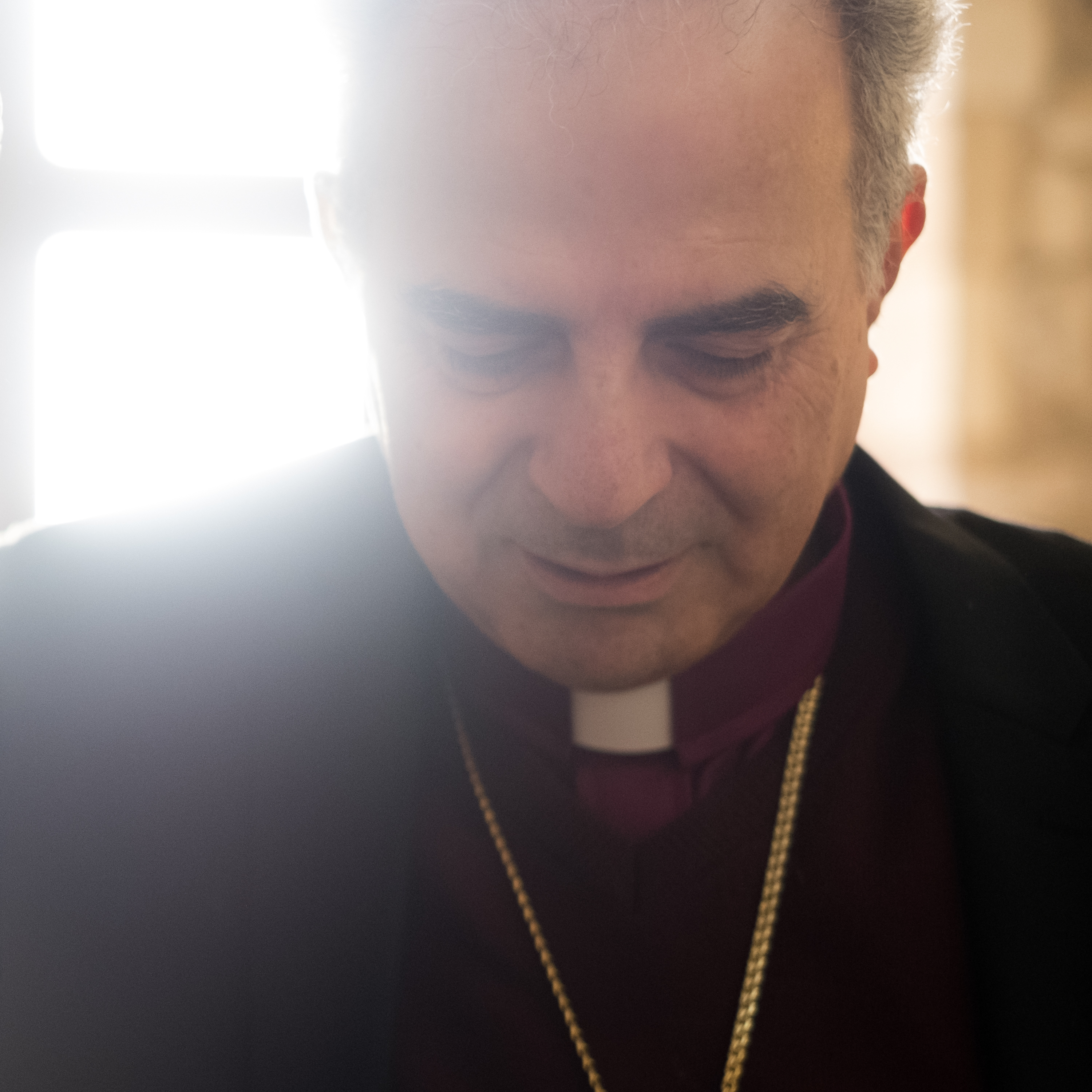
- Bishop-emeritus of the Evangelical Lutheran Church in Jordan and the Holy Land
- Born: June 22, 1961 (age 65); Lebanon
- Occupation: Bishop
- Spouse: Nahla Elias
- Children: Three children

Dr. Sani Ibrahim "Barhoum" Azar (ساني ابراهيم عازر June 22, 1961) is the fourth Bishop of the Evangelical Lutheran Church in Jordan and the Holy Land.

== Biography ==
Azar is a product of The Evangelical Lutheran Schools in Palestine, graduating from The Evangelical Lutheran School of Bethlehem in 1979. Azar earned his theology degree from LMU Munich, Germany in 1987. He speaks fluent German as a second language. His first language is Arabic. His Master's thesis was, “The History of the Evangelical Mission in the 19th and 20th Century.” He was ordained March 25, 1988, and elected to be the incoming bishop in January 2017. Azar served as pastor of the Evangelical Lutheran Church of the Redeemer in the Old City, Jerusalem for 30 years. In 2023, Azar was awarded Doctorate of Divinity honoris causa from the United Lutheran Seminary.

Before becoming the pastor of Redeemer, Azar served as youth pastor and president of the ELCJHL Synod.

=== Early life ===
Azar was born on 22 June 1961 in Lebanon to Mr. Charlie Azar originally from Jaffa and Mrs. Jihan Azar, originally from Nazareth. His father was a deacon with the Bethel order of German deacons. His father was the House Father at the Schneller School in Lebanon and at the Boarding School of the Evangelical Lutheran School in Bethlehem and Beit Jala. Azar was greatly influenced by his father's diaconal work with their people in Palestine. Azar attributes his respect for missions and diakonia to his two aunts who were among the first Palestinian deaconesses in the Lutheran church in Palestine. His aunts also worked with youth in the Lutheran schools during Azar's childhood. Later, when Azar was called to pursue ordained ministry, he went to Germany to study and became fluent in the German language.

=== Marriage and children ===
In 1992 Azar married Nahla Elias, who is from Amman, Jordan and they have three daughters:

- Sally Azar (1996) completed her master's degree in theology at the Near East School of Theology in Beirut. Sally studied for an advanced theology degree in Germany. She was elected youth representative for the Lutheran World Federation (LWF) council in May 2017. Sally was ordained in January 2023, becoming the first female Palestinian pastor in the Holy Land.
- Sama Azar (2001) is currently studying to become a social worker and deacon in Bethel
- Jihan Azar (1994) is recently married and pursuing an advanced degree pharmaceutical studies in Cairo.

=== Accomplishments and activities ===
Azar serves on the board of The Near East School of Theology, the board of the Bethany Beyond the Jordan Baptismal Site, and is the President of the Lutheran Ecclesiastical Court. He also serves on The Department of Services to Palestinian Refugees (DSPR) a division of the Middle East Council of Churches, and the Housing Committee of the Augusta Victoria Hospital Lutheran World Federation board. In his service to the church, Azar has always been a member of the ELCJHL Church Council. He also is a board member of the Jerusalem Society of Berlin Missions and the Vice President of the Evangelical Lutheran German School of Talitha Kumi in Beit Jala.

Azar is the founder of the Day Care Center for the Elderly located next door to Redeemer Church.
