= Fellowship of Middle East Evangelical Churches =

The Fellowship of Middle East Evangelical Churches (FMEEC) is an ecumenical organisation comprising Protestant churches in the Middle East with representatives from Sudan to Iran. Established in 1974, the current president of the FMEEC is the Rev Dr Andrea Zaki.

== History ==
=== Early cooperation ===
Protestant churches and missions were one of the early proponents of ecumenism and inter-church cooperation in the Middle East. In 1911, an inter-Protestant effort was initiated in Beirut leading to the establishment of the United Missionary Council in 1920. A parallel development occurred in 1924 when a Conference for Workers in Moslem Lands was convened in Jerusalem leading to the eventual formation of the Western Asia and North Africa Council in Helwan in 1927. Other early cooperative efforts that stemmed from these early initiatives were the Missionary Conference of Syria and Palestine and the Missionary Conference of all Egypt. These various groups eventually united as the Near East Christian Council in 1927.

=== Near East Council of Churches ===
As missionary influences gradually reduced, the Near East Christian Council took on a more indigenous flavour. As amicable contact and informal cooperation between the Protestants and the Eastern and Oriental Orthodox continued to develop, the Syriac Orthodox Church established formal cooperation with the Protestants in 1962 and enlarged council became known as the Near East Council of Churches.

=== Middle East Council of Churches ===
In 1964, dialogue began to form a larger ecumenical organisation in the Middle East incorporating the various Church traditions present in the region. This meant that the Protestants had to intentionally take a smaller administrative role in coordinating inter-church work. The result of this dialogue was the establishment of the Middle East Council of Churches in 1974. A Protestant specific fellowship was also retained and became formally known as the Fellowship of Middle East Evangelical Churches in the same year.

=== Current developments ===
Efforts continue to be made to establish full fellowship and communion between the member churches of the FMECC. In 1997, the FMECC tabled a Proposal for the Unity of the Evangelical Churches in the Middle East but failed to achieve agreement between the member churches. A renewed effort was made in 2005 focusing on member churches of the Reformed and Lutheran traditions and in 2006 an agreement was reached in Amman for full communion was reached with the signing of the Amman Declaration of Lutheran and Reformed Churches in the Middle East and North Africa. The declaration established the mutual recognition of baptism, eucharist, ministry and ordination between the signatory churches.

== Member churches ==
The FMEEC consists of the following Protestant denominations:

North Africa

- Trans-national

- Protestant Church of Algeria
- Methodist Church in Tunisia

- Egypt

- Anglican Diocese of Egypt
- Evangelical Church of Egypt (Synod of the Nile)
- Evangelical Presbyterian Church of Egypt

- Sudan

- Episcopal Church of the Sudan
- Evangelical Presbyterian Synod of the Sudan
- Presbyterian Church of the Sudan

Levant & Mashriq

- Trans-national

- Anglican Diocese of Jerusalem
- Evangelical Lutheran Church in Jordan and the Holy Land
- National Evangelical Synod of Syria and Lebanon
- Union of the Armenian Evangelical Churches in the Near East

- Iraq

- Council of Protestant Churches in Iraq

- Lebanon

- National Evangelical Union of Lebanon

Arabian Peninsula & Iran

- Trans-national

- Anglican Diocese of Cyprus and the Gulf

- Iran

- Anglican Diocese of Iran
- Evangelical Presbyterian Church of Iran

- Kuwait

- National Evangelical Church in Kuwait

== Affiliations ==
The FMEEC is a regional member of the World Council of Churches.

== See also ==
- Christianity in the Middle East
- Middle East Council of Churches
