= Sally Azar =

Palestinian Lutheran pastor

- Born: June 10, 1996 (age 29); Jerusalem
- Alma mater: University of Göttingen; Hermannsburg Mission Seminary; Near East School of Theology
- Occupation: Lutheran pastor
- Employer: Evangelical Lutheran Church in Jordan and the Holy Land
- Parent(s): Sani Ibrahim Azar

Sally Azar (Arabic: سالي عازر; born 1996 in Jerusalem) is a Palestinian pastor. She was ordained in January 2023, by the Evangelical Lutheran Church in Jordan and the Holy Land in a ceremony at the Church of the Redeemer in Jerusalem, making her the first female Palestinian pastor in the Holy Land. Azar is the daughter of bishop Sani Ibrahim Azar.

== Family and education ==
Sally was born in Jerusalem in 1996, the middle child of Sani Ibrahim Azar, bishop of the Lutheran Church, and Nahla Azar. She completed her schooling at the Schmidt's Girls College in Jerusalem in 2014 and then studied theology at the Near East Theological Seminary in Beirut, earning her bachelor's degree in 2018. She earned her master's degree in theology from the University of Göttingen and Hermannsburg College in Germany.
