= Church of the Sacred Heart of Jesus (Latakia) =

Catholic church in Syria

Church of the Sacred Heart of Jesus كنيسة قلب اليسوع الأقدس
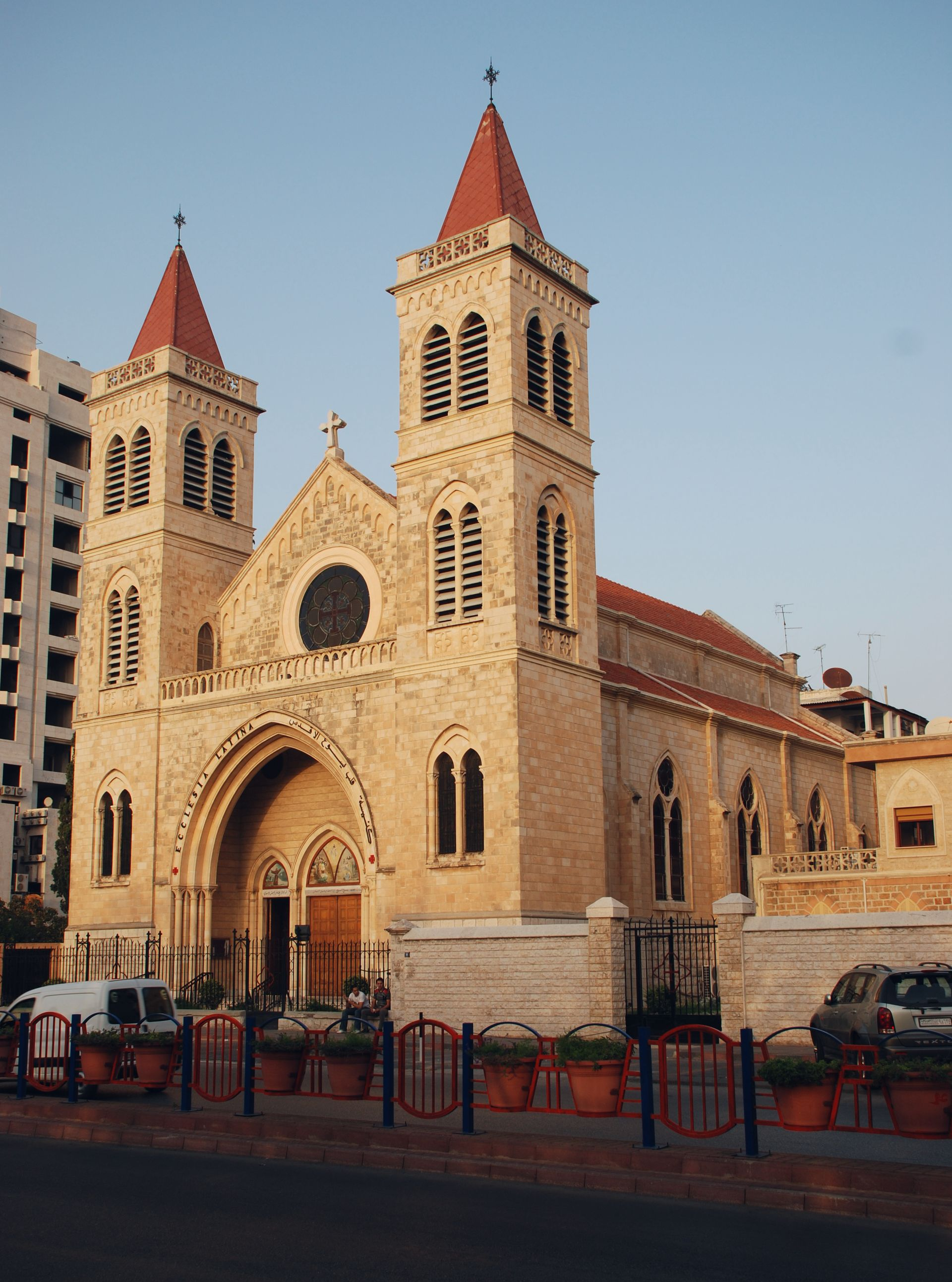

Religion
- Affiliation: Roman Catholic Church
- Ecclesiastical or organizational status: Active

Location
- Location: Latakia, Syria
- Interactive map of Church of the Sacred Heart of Jesus كنيسة قلب اليسوع الأقدس
- Coordinates: 35.5147421°N 35.7743382°E

Architecture
- Type: Church
- Completed: 1933

The Church of the Sacred Heart of Jesus (Arabic: كنيسة قلب اليسوع الأقدس) also known as the Latin Church (Arabic: كنيسة اللاتين) is a Catholic church located in Latakia, Syria. The church was built in two phases. The first was in 1829, and the second in 1933. It is located on the seafront of the city, near the Port of Latakia.

Franciscans settled in the city of Latakia around 1733, and built a small monastery around 1829. During the French Mandate of Syria and the Lebanon, French engineers expanded the monastery in the 19th of March, 1933 into its current form. About 90 clergies have worked in the church, which is one of the biggest in Latakia, as it contains an abbey, with a large hall and a courtyard containing a garden.

== See also ==
- National Evangelical Presbyterian Church of Latakia
- Christianity in Syria
