= Coptic Evangelical Organization for Social Services =

Coptic Evangelical Organization for Social Services (CEOSS)
- Type: Development organization
- Location: Cairo, Egypt
- Key people: Rev. Andrea Zaki Stephanous, (General Director)
- Website: en.ceoss-eg.org

The Coptic Evangelical Organization for Social Services (CEOSS), headquartered in Cairo, Egypt, is an Egyptian Coptic Christian development organization. It was established in 1960 by the Coptic Evangelical Church, but is now independent.

Reverend Andrea Zaki Stephanous is its General Director.
