= Theological Review =

Theological Review is a semi-annual theological journal published by the Near East School of Theology. It was established in 1978, replacing the Near East School of Theology Quarterly, which ran from 1952 to 1974.
