= Filippo Ciampanelli =

Italian Roman Catholic prelate (born 1978)

The Most Reverend Filippo Ciampanelli
- Titular Bishop of Aquae in Mauretania; Under-Secretary of the Dicastery for the Eastern Churches
- Church: Catholic Church
- Appointed: 12 January 2025

Orders
- Ordination: 21 June 2003 by Renato Corti
- Consecration: 19 February 2025 by Claudio Gugerotti

Personal details
- Born: 30 July 1978 (age 48) Novara, Italy
- Denomination: Roman Catholic
- Education: Pontifical Gregorian University, Pontifical Ecclesiastical Academy
- Motto: Omnia mea tua sunt
- Coat of arms

Filippo Ciampanelli (born 30 July 1978) is an Italian Roman Catholic prelate and diplomat of the Holy See. He serves as Under-Secretary of the Dicastery for the Eastern Churches and as titular bishop of Aquae in Mauretania.

== Early life and education ==
Ciampanelli was born on 30 July 1978 in Novara, Italy. He was ordained a priest for the Diocese of Novara on 21 June 2003.

He pursued higher ecclesiastical studies in Rome, earning a doctorate in theology from the Pontifical Gregorian University.

== Diplomatic and Curial service ==
After completing his formation at the Pontifical Ecclesiastical Academy, Ciampanelli entered the diplomatic service of the Holy See on 1 July 2009. He served in several apostolic nunciatures, including those in Georgia, Armenia, Azerbaijan, and Belarus.

In 2015, he was assigned to the Section for General Affairs of the Secretariat of State of the Holy See. During this period, he occasionally read speeches and catecheses on behalf of Pope Francis when the Pope was temporarily unable to speak due to illness.

On 15 April 2024, Pope Francis appointed him Under-Secretary of the Dicastery for the Eastern Churches.

== Episcopate ==
On 12 January 2025, Pope Francis appointed Ciampanelli titular bishop of Aquae in Mauretania, confirming him in his role as Under-Secretary of the Dicastery for the Eastern Churches.

He received episcopal consecration on 19 February 2025, with Cardinal Claudio Gugerotti as the principal consecrator.

The Diocese of Novara marked his elevation to the episcopate with public celebrations and messages of congratulations, emphasizing his pastoral roots in the local Church.
