= Egyptian Council of Churches =

The Egyptian Council of Churches is an organization representing different churches in Egypt, including the Coptic Orthodox Church, as well as Coptic Catholic, Evangelical, Coptic Pentecostal, Armenian Orthodox and Greek Orthodox churches. The council's formation was announced in January 2013. Its first meeting was held on February 18, 2013, at Saint Mark's Coptic Orthodox Cathedral in Cairo, and was chaired by Pope Tawadros II of Alexandria. Representatives chose Tawadros II as the council's first president. The presidency is set to rotate every three years between the different church leaders.

The council aims to unite Egypt's Christian churches, while retaining the independence of each, to facilitate Muslim-Christian dialogue, and to discuss various social and political issues from a Christian perspective, such as abortion, the constitution and the personal status law. Marking the first anniversary of its formation in February 2014, the council stated that it has no political goals and that it would back no candidate in the country's 2014 presidential election. When it was announced, the idea received widespread support from Egypt's different Christian communities, and its formation was praised by Bishop Munib Younan of the Evangelical Lutheran Church in Jordan and the Holy Land.
