= Andrea Zaki =

Egyptian Protestant religious leader

Rev. Dr. Andrea Zaki Stephanous (Arabic: أندريه زكى اسطفانوس Egyptian Arabic pronunciation: [ɑnd(e)ˈɾejæ ˈzæki (e)sˈtefanʊs]; born June 30, 1960) is president of the Protestant Community of Egypt, and General Director of the Coptic Evangelical Organization for Social Services.

== Early life and education ==
Zaki was born in 1960. After receiving his B. of Theology from Cairo Evangelical Seminary, Cairo, Egypt in 1983, he went to Coady International Institute, St. Francis Xavier University, Antigonish, Nova Scotia, Canada, where he continued his studies, receiving a Diploma in Social Development in 1988.

In 1994, he received Master of Arts in theological studies (major social change), Eastern University, Pennsylvania, US, and in 2003 he received his Ph.D. in religions and theology, University of Manchester, Manchester, UK.

== Employment experience ==
=== Current positions ===
- General Director of the Coptic Evangelical Organization for Social Services.
- President of the Protestant Community of Egypt (2015–present)
- President of the Fellowship of Middle East Evangelical Churches
- Director, Dar El Thaqafa Communications House, CEOSS
- Editor Manager – Agnihat El Nessour (Eagle's wings), a magazine published by CEOSS expressing the point of view of Egyptian Christians ( 1994 – present ).
- Part-time Lecturer giving a course on Political Religions and Theological Foundation for Social Change at the Evangelical Theological Seminary in Cairo (ETSC).

=== Previous positions ===
- Vice General Director for Program Affairs in CEOSS
- Moderator, Synod of the Nile of the Presbyterian churches of Egypt (2006).
- Chairman of Council of Services & Development, Synod of the Nile of the Presbyterian churches of Egypt (2000–2008).
- Chairman of Cairo Presbytery, Synod of the Nile of the Presbyterian Church of Egypt ( 2002–2003 ).
- Secretary of Projects, Council of Services & Development, Synod of the Nile of the Evangelical Church of Egypt ( 1994–2000).
- Head of CEOSS" Forum of Intercultural Dialogue - dealing with political and economic issues facing Egypt today, engaging leaders, government officials and intellectuals, both Muslim & Christian in direct dialogue (1994–1999 ).
- Director of CEOSS' Development Sector in North Egypt ( 1991–1994 ).
- Chairman of CEOSS' Curriculum Committee ( 1991–1994 ).
- Head of CEOSS' Training Unit - responsible for staff training and scholarships ( 1993–1994).
- Editor of CEOSS' Development Magazine Risalet El Nour (Message of Light) (1992–1994).
- Member of Dar El Thaqafa Council ( 1990–1994 ).
- Associate Director for CEOSS' Development Sector ( 1988–1991 ).
- Head of CEOSS' Cairo Development Sector ( 1987–1988 ).
- Community Coordinator of CEOSS' Development Sector ( 1986 ).

== Publications ==
=== Publications in Arabic ===
Author of two books entitled:

1. Copts and the Revolution. Dar El Thaqafa Communications House, 2014
2. Jesus and Historical Criticism: The Story of the Conflict Between Salvation and Social Change. Cairo: Dar El Thaqafa Communications House, 1996.
3. Political Islam, Citizenship and Minorities: The Future of Arab Christians in the Middle East. Cairo: Sherouk International Library, 2006.

Writer of 40 articles in Arabic published in national newspapers like Al-Ahram newspaper and in Christian Magazines

=== Publications in English ===
- Author of the book entitled " Political Islam, Citizenship, and Minorities" published by University Press of America.
- Writer of 7 articles in English for Action- WACC, IVP Academic and World Vision.

== Personal Information ==
Zaki is married with three children.
