= Albrecht Alt =

German Protestant theologian (1883-1956)

Albrecht Alt (20 September 1883, in Stübach (Franconia) – 24 April 1956, in Leipzig), was a leading German Protestant theologian.

Eldest son of a Lutheran minister, he completed high school in Ansbach and studied theology at Friedrich-Alexander-University in Erlangen and the University of Leipzig. From 1907 to 1908 he was a candidate for the office of lecturer at Munich Predigerseminar (Lutheran preachers seminary). In 1908 he was a scholarship holder of the German Protestant Institute of Archaeology of the Holy Land in Jerusalem and undertook his first Palestine journey. In the same year he became a supervisor of the theological College in Greifswald. In 1909 he wrote Israel und Aegypten ("Israel and Egypt") as part of his doctorate at the University of Greifswald.

In 1912 he became an associate professor in Greifswald, and in 1914 was named by Bernhard Duhm as a professor at the University of Basel. During the First World War he served as a leader in the cartography department of the German Eastern Army. After the war he was again appointed a professor in Basel, and in 1920 Provost at the Evangelical Redeemer Church in Jerusalem. In 1921 he was appointed to the University of Halle, however, he went to Jerusalem during the winter of 1921/22 to serve as head of the German Protestant Institute for Ancient Studies of the Holy Land (DEI) as well as to perform duties at the Redeemer Church. In 1923 he succeeded Rudolf Kittel at the University of Leipzig.

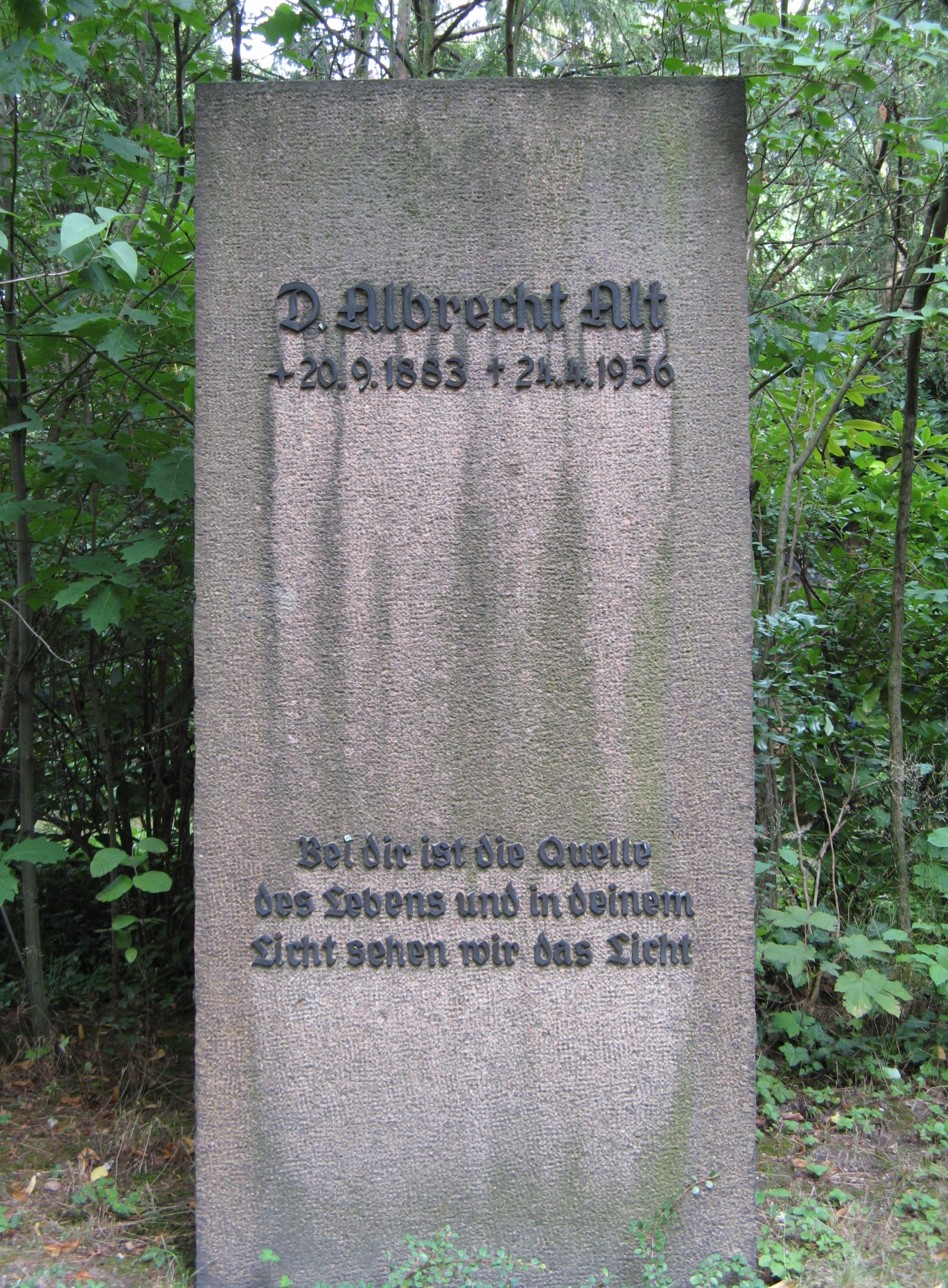
Gravestone of Albrecht Alt at the Südfriedhof (Leipzig)

== Works ==
- Die Landnahme der Israeliten in Palästina; Territorialgeschichtliche Studien, Leipzig: Druckerei der Werkgemeinschaft, 1925
- Der Gott der Väter: Ein Beitrag zur Vorgeschichte der israelitischen Religion, Stuttgart: Kohlhammer Verlag, 1929, (Beiträge zur Wissenschaft vom Alten und Neuen Testament; 48 = Folge 3, H. 12). Translation of the title: 'The God of the fathers. A contribution to the prehistory of Israelite religion'.
- Der Stadtstaat Samaria, Berlin: Akademie-Verlag, 1954, (Berichte über die Verhandlungen der Sächsischen Akademie der Wissenschaften zu Leipzig, Philologisch-historische Klasse; vol. 101,5). Translation of the title: 'The city state of Samaria'.
- Die Herkunft der Hyksos in neuer Sicht, Berlin: Akademie-Verlag, 1954, (Berichte über die Verhandlungen der Sächsischen Akademie der Wissenschaften zu Leipzig, Philologisch-historische Klasse; vol. 101,6). Translation of the title: 'A New View on the origin of the Hyksos'.
- Essays on Old Testament history and religion [Kleine Schriften zur Geschichte des Volkes Israel. Auswahl in einem Band (besides the first edition of 1959 in 2 vols.), Berlin: Evangelische Verlags-Anstalt, 1962; English], R.A. Wilson (trl.), Oxford: Blackwell, 1966, 274 pp.
- "Origins of Israelite law" [Die Ursprünge des israelitischen Rechts, Leipzig: Hirzel, 1934, (Berichte über die Verhandlungen der Sächsischen Akademie der Wissenschaften zu Leipzig, Philologisch-Historische Klasse; vol. 86,1); English], in: Albrecht Alt, Essays on Old Testament history and religion, R.A. Wilson (trl.), Oxford: Blackwell, 1966, pp. 101–171.
- Völker und Staaten Syriens im frühen Altertum, Leipzig: Hinrichs, 1936, (Der alte Orient: gemeinverständliche Darstellungen; vol. 34,4). Translation of the title: 'Peoples and states of Syria in early antiquity'.
- Where Jesus worked: Towns and villages of Galilee studied with the help of local history [Stätten des Wirkens Jesu in Galiläa territorialgeschichtlich betrachtet (1949); English], Kenneth Grayston (trl.), London: Epworth Press, c1961.
