= Talitha Kumi School =

School in Beit Jala, West Bank, Palestine

Coordinates: 31.708°N 35.1735°E

Talitha Kumi School Arabic: طاليثا قومي
- Beit Jala, West Bank, Palestine

Information
- Religious affiliation: German Evangelical Lutheran
- Principal: Rolf Lindemann

Talitha Kumi - German Evangelical Lutheran School (Arabic: طاليثا قومي), is a German international school in Beit Jala, West Bank, in the State of Palestine. The school, located in proximity to Bethlehem and 10 kilometres (6.2 mi) from Jerusalem, serves Kindergarten, and primary school through senior high school level. Students may obtain the Tawjihi and/or the Deutsche Internationale Abiturprüfung (DIAP). The Evangelical Lutheran Church in Jordan and the Holy Land operates the school. The name "Talitha Kumi" originates from Aramaic words which mean "Get up, girl!" or "Little girl, I tell you to get up," a phrase stated by Jesus Christ when he resurrected Jairus's daughter. As of 2015 Rolf Lindemann is the principal of Talitha Kumi.

The Talitha Kumi Community College is a post-secondary community college for hotel management operated by Talitha Kumi.

== History ==
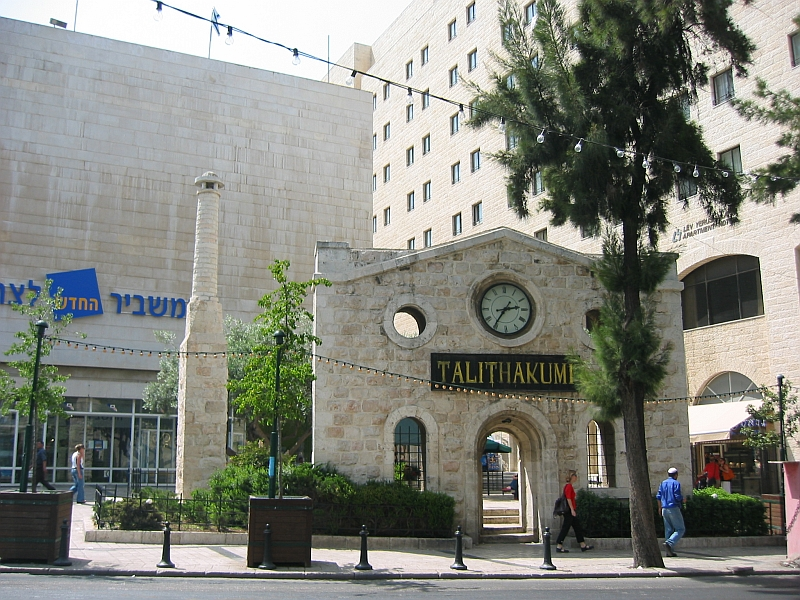
Remains of the former campus in Jerusalem

Theodor Fliedner established a home for Arab girls in Jerusalem, then in the Mutasarrifate of Jerusalem, Ottoman Empire, in 1851. In 1858 there were 32 students, including Jews, Arabs, and Armenians. The school received the name "Talitha Kumi" in 1868, when it received a new building and had 89 students. The seminary and deaconess schools opened in 1905. World War I caused a temporary closure; there were 140 students and eleven deaconess teachers in 1914, right as the closure occurred. Up until 1918 the British authorities held the women in Egypt. The school's area became a part of the Occupied Enemy Territory Administration, and then British Mandate of Palestine. The school reopened in 1926, one year after the British authorities gave the school back to the original owners.

In 1949, operations in Jerusalem ended; this was because the original location was on the Israeli side the border after the Israeli Declaration of Independence. The post-Israel Talitha Kumi originally operated in Jordanian-controlled territory. The school opened in its current location in Beit Jala in 1961. At the time Beit Jala was a part of Jordan. Israel captured the West Bank from Jordan in the 1967 Six-Day War, prompting the Israeli occupation of the West Bank. Beit Jala went to Palestinian control after 1993.

== Curriculum ==
The elementary school program uses the Palestinian curriculum. In Kindergarten students begin learning English. In the second grade they begin learning German. For secondary school students may choose between a Tawjihi programme and an international programme in which 50% of all classes are taught in German, leading to the DIAP.

== Student body ==
As of a period before 2015 the school had almost 830 students, with 62% being Christian and 38% being Muslim. The student body is 50% female and 50% male. About 90% of the students live in the West Bank and the remaining 10% live in East Jerusalem and other Palestinian enclaves. As of 2015 the percentage of Muslim students is increasing because many Christians are leaving Palestine and due to other demographic changes. The school had 865 students, 59% Christian and 41% Muslim, during the 2011–2012 school year: the gender balance was 52% girls and 48% boys.

As of circa 2009 many students were impeded from getting to school due to difficulty in going to and from their home villages. The school previously admitted students from the Gaza Strip, but the school no longer admitted them once Israel instituted closure policies in the mid-1990s that prevented students temporarily in Gaza from returning to school and vice versa.

== Teaching staff ==
As of 2015 Palestinians make up almost every member of the teaching staff.

== Facilities ==
The school is located on a 10-hectare (25-acre) property. There is a boarding facility for female students. As of 2015, there are 18 female students who board. As of 2009 the school had a dormitory for boys. The school offers a guest house for tourists in Palestine.

The pre-1949 campus in Jerusalem was on King George Street.

== See also ==
- Education in the Ottoman Empire
