= Dicastery for the Eastern Churches =

Dicastery of the Roman Curia

- Dicasterium pro Ecclesiis Orientalibus
- Coat of arms of the Holy See

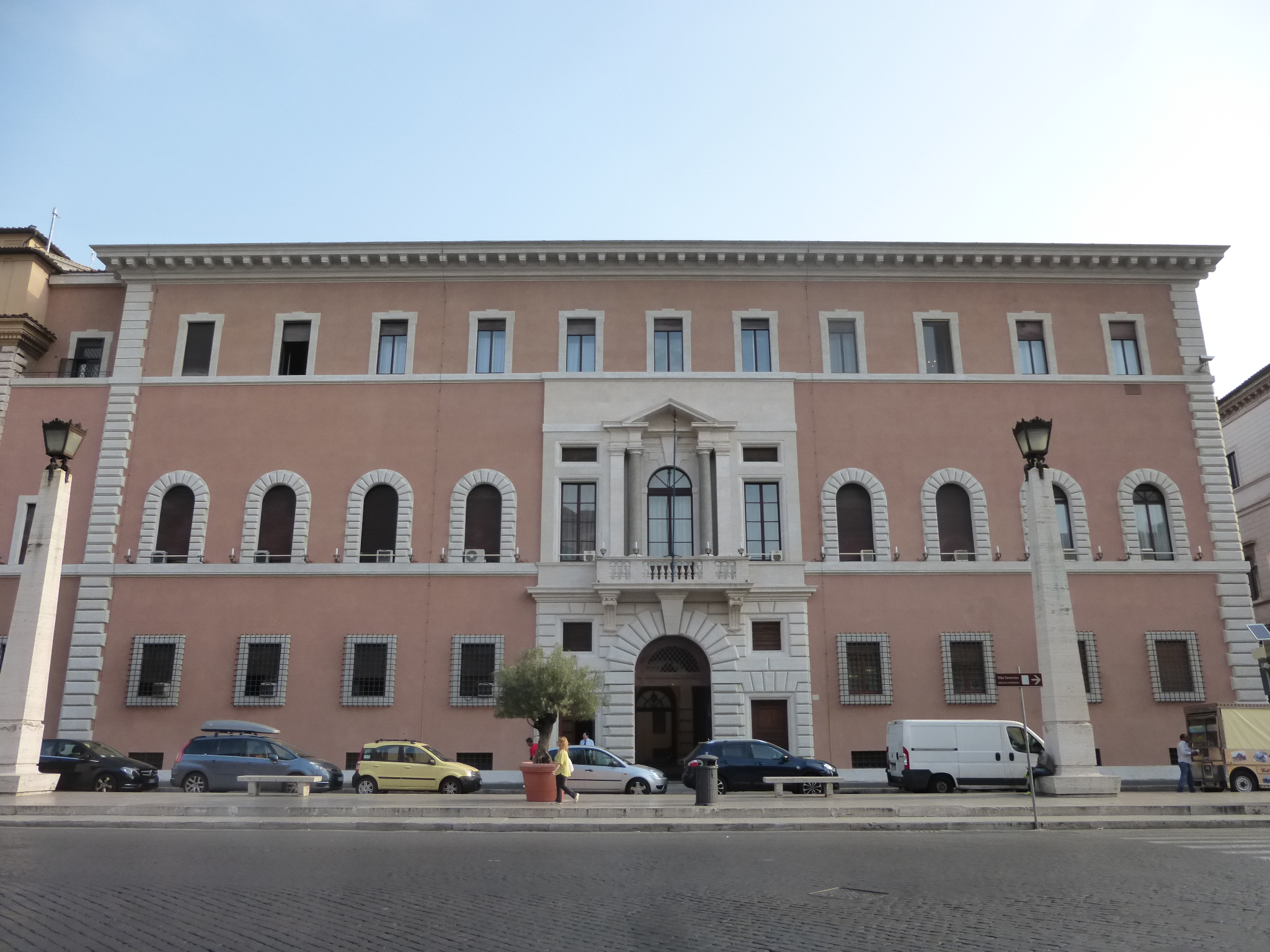
- Palazzo dei Convertendi, seat of the Dicastery for the Eastern Churches

Dicastery overview
- Formed: January 6, 1862; 164 years ago
- Preceding agencies: Congregatio de Propaganda Fide pro negotiis ritus orientalis; Congregatio pro Ecclesia Orientali; Congregation for the Oriental Churches
- Type: Dicastery
- Headquarters: Palazzo dei Convertendi, Rome, Italy
- Dicastery executives: Claudio Gugerotti, Prefect; Michel Jalakh, Secretary; Filippo Ciampanelli, Under-Secretary

The Dicastery for the Eastern Churches (also called the Dicastery for the Oriental Churches), previously named the Congregation for the Oriental Churches or Congregation for the Eastern Churches (Latin: Congregatio pro Ecclesiis Orientalibus), is a dicastery of the Roman Curia responsible for contact with the Eastern Catholic churches for the purpose of assisting their development and protecting their rights. It maintains whole and entire in the one Catholic Church the heritage and canon law of the various Eastern Catholic traditions. It has exclusive authority over Egypt and the Sinai Peninsula, Eritrea and northern Ethiopia, southern Albania and Bulgaria, Cyprus, Greece, Iran, Iraq, Lebanon, Israel (and Palestinian territories), Syria, Jordan and Turkey, and also oversees jurisdictions based in Romania, Southern Italy, Hungary, India and Ukraine.

It was founded by the motu proprio Dei providentis of Pope Benedict XV as the "Sacred Congregation for the Oriental Church" on 1 May 1917.

== Structure ==
Patriarchs and major archbishops of the Oriental churches, and the president of the Pontifical Council for Promoting Christian Unity, are members of this dicastery by virtue of the law itself. The consultors and officials are selected to reflect the diversity of rites.

== Authority ==
This dicastery has authority over:

- all matters which relate to the Oriental churches referred to the Holy See (structure and organisation of the churches; exercise of the offices of teaching, sanctifying and ruling; status, rights, and obligations of persons), and
- the ad limina visits of Eastern bishops.

This dicastery's authority does not include the exclusive authority of the Dicastery for the Doctrine of the Faith and for the Causes of Saints, of the Apostolic Penitentiary, the Supreme Tribunal of the Apostolic Signatura, and the Tribunal of the Roman Rota, including what pertains to dispensations from a marriage ratum sed non consummatum ('"ratified but not consummated"). (Note: This is according to the Ap. Const. Pastor Bonus, Art. 58 §2. However, on 30 August 2011, Pope Benedict XVI amended Pastor Bonus with the motu proprio Quaerit semper, thereby transferring jurisdiction over marriages ratum sed non consummatum from the Dicastery for Divine Worship and the Discipline of the Sacraments to a special office at the Tribunal of the Roman Rota. The law obrogated the provision stating the "exclusive competence" of the Dicastery for Divine Worship regarding these marriages, for this provision was not expressly abrogated and the office at the Roman Rota now oversees dispensations from such marriages. (Cf. Benedict XVI, MP Quaerit semper, accessed August 8, 2012.)) In matters which affect the Eastern as well as the Latin churches, the dicastery operates, if the matter is important enough, in consultation with the dicastery that has authority in the matter for the Latin Church. The Latin Patriarchate of Jerusalem is exempt from the authority of the dicastery, being directly subject to the Holy See.

The dicastery pays special attention to communities of Eastern Catholic faithful who live in the territory of the Latin Church and attends to their spiritual needs by providing visitors and even their own hierarchs, so far as possible and where numbers and circumstances require, in consultation with the congregation competent to establish particular churches in the region.

In regions where the Eastern churches have been dominant from ancient times, apostolic and missionary activity is solely the responsibility of this dicastery, even if the above is carried out by Latin Church missionaries.

The dicastery collaborates with the Dicastery for Promoting Christian Unity in matters that concern relations with non-Catholic Eastern churches and with the Dicastery for Interreligious Dialogue in matters within the scope of the latter.

== History ==
The origins of a congregation for Eastern rite Christians date back to Pope Gregory XIII who, in 1573, at the instigation of the Albanian communities of Southern Italy, established the Congregatio de rebus graecorum, which was entrusted with addressing problems relating to Byzantine-rite Catholics, as well as defending and spreading the faith among Eastern Christians. In 1622, the Congregation de Propaganda fide was erected, whose specific purpose was to provide both for missions among pagans and for activities to be carried out in the Christian East under the yoke of infidels. The need was soon felt to establish committees specifically for Eastern Catholics within the Propaganda fide itself: the Commission super dubiis orientalium (1627) and the Commission super correctione euchologii graecorum (1636–1645) were thus created. In 1719, the latter had its responsibilities expanded and its name changed to the Congregation for the Correction of the Books of the Eastern Church (Congregatio super correctione librorum Ecclesiae orientalis).

The Congregation for the Correction of the Books of the Eastern Church was established by Pope Clement XI in 1719 on the model of an earlier temporary congregation, the congregatio super correctione Euchologii Graecorum, created by Pope Urban VIII in 1636 and suppressed in 1645; this institution had been born, under pressure from King Philip IV of Spain, for the correction of the euchologia printed by the large Greek community present at the time in Sicily and Calabria. Clement XI desired a new Congregation, independent of Propaganda Fide, for the revision of the liturgical books of the Eastern Churches in communion with the Holy See. Revitalized by Pope Benedict XIV, in 1756 the Congregation reached the publication of the authorized version of the Greek euchologion, with the bull Ex quo primum of March 1, 1756. The Congregation was no longer active until the beginning of the 19th century, when it was re-established under the authority of Cardinal Lorenzo Litta on June 30, 1816.

On 6 January 1862, Pope Pius IX suppressed this congregation and established the Congregatio de Propaganda Fide pro negotiis ritus orientalis, a section of the Congregation for the Propagation of the Faith "for the affairs of the Oriental Rite", with the apostolic constitution Romani Pontifici. Pope Benedict XV declared it independent on 1 May 1917 with the motu proprio Dei providentis and named it the Congregatio pro Ecclesia Orientali (Congregation for the Eastern Church). It was presided over by the pope and a cardinal filled the role of Secretary. There were also councillors, chosen from among the more distinguished clergy and those experienced in issues affecting these churches. Pope Paul VI changed its name by adopting the plural Congregatio pro Ecclesiis Orientalibus (Congregation for Eastern Churches) with the apostolic constitution Regimini Ecclesiae Universae of 15 August 1967, reflecting the major decree Orientalium Ecclesiarum of the Second Vatican Council. Pope Francis, with his apostolic constitution Praedicate evangelium, which took effect on 5 June 2022, changed its name to the Dicastery for the Eastern Churches.

The current prefect of the dicastery is Claudio Gugerotti. The secretary is Michel Jalakh. The undersecretary is Flavio Pace. Two are clerics of the Latin Church with Jalakh being a Maronite.

== Leadership ==
Prefect of Congregation for the Oriental Churches
- Coat of arms of the Holy See

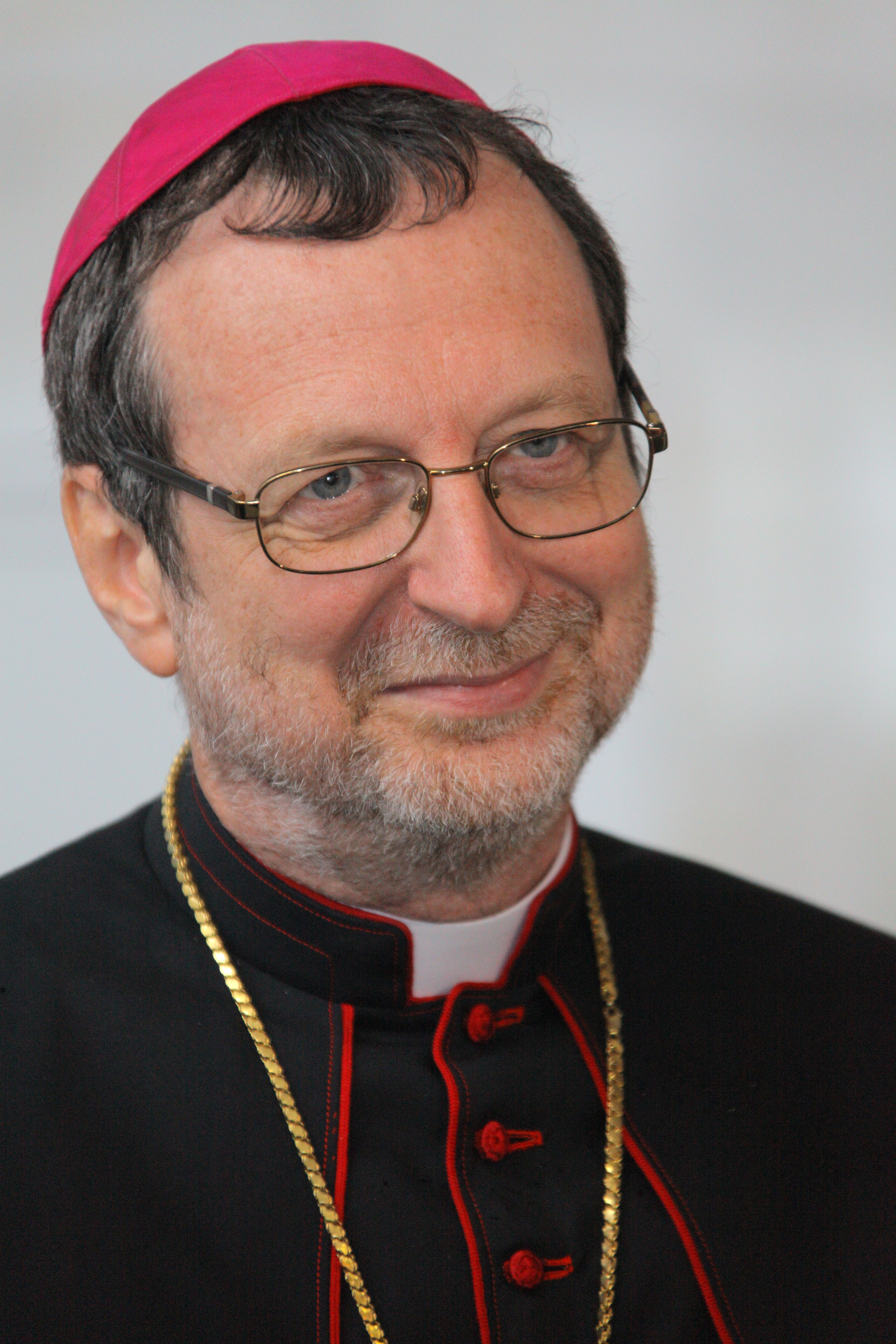
- Incumbent; Claudio Gugerotti since November 21, 2022
- Congregation for the Oriental Churches
- Style: His Excellency
- Member of: Roman Curia
- Reports to: The Pope
- Appointer: The Pope
- Term length: Five years, renewable
- Formation: 1917

From 1917 to 1967, the pope held the title of prefect of the Congregation, which was headed by a cardinal secretary. From then until 2022 it was headed by a cardinal prefect. When Claudio Gugerotti was named to head this Curia office, by then called a dicastery, he was an archbishop.

No.	Name	From	Until	Prefect/Appointer
1	Niccolò Marini	1917	1922	Benedict XV
2	Giovanni Tacci Porcelli	1922	1927	Pius XI
3	Luigi Sincero	1927	1936	Pius XI
4	Eugène-Gabriel- Gervais-Laurent; Tisserant	1936	1959	Pius XI
5	Amleto Giovanni; Cicognani	1959	1961	John XXIII
6	Gabriel Acacius Coussa	1961; Pro-Secretary	1962; Secretary	John XXIII
7	Gustavo Testa	1962	1967	John XXIII

No.	Name	From	Until	Appointer
1	Gustavo Testa	15 August 1967	13 January 1968	Paul VI
2	Maximilien de Furstenberg	15 January 1968	8 February 1973	Paul VI
3	Paul-Pierre Philippe	6 March 1973	27 June 1980	Paul VI
4	Władysław Rubin	27 June 1980	30 October 1985	John Paul II
5	Duraisamy Simon; Lourdusamy	30 October 1985	24 May 1991	John Paul II
6	Achille Silvestrini	24 May 1991	7 September 2000	John Paul II
7	Ignatius Moussa Daoud	25 November 2000	9 June 2007	John Paul II
8	Leonardo Sandri	9 June 2007	21 November 2022	Benedict XVI
9	Claudio Gugerotti	21 November 2022	Incumbent	Francis
