= Michel Jalakh =

Lebanese Maronite Catholic archbishop and Roman Curia official (born 1966)

His Excellency, The Most Reverend Michel Jalakh O.A.M.
- Titular Archbishop of Nisibi of the Maronites, Secretary of the Dicastery for the Eastern Churches
- Church: Catholic Church
- Previous post: Secretary General of the Middle East Council of Churches

Orders
- Ordination: 21 April 1991
- Consecration: 8 June 2024

Personal details
- Born: 27 August 1966 (age 59) Baouchrieh, Lebanon
- Denomination: Maronite Church
- Motto: Mihi vivere Christus est

Michel Jalakh O.A.M. (born 27 August 1966) is a Lebanese Maronite Catholic archbishop and Roman Curia official. He has served as Secretary of the Dicastery for the Eastern Churches since February 2023. He was appointed Titular Archbishop of Nisibi of the Maronites in March 2024. He is a member of the Antonian Maronite Order and has held numerous academic and ecumenical leadership roles, including Rector of the Antonian University in Baabda and Secretary General of the Middle East Council of Churches (MECC).

== Early life and education ==
Michel Jalakh was born on 27 August 1966 in Baouchrieh, in the Mount Lebanon Governorate of Lebanon. He made his first religious profession in the Antonian Maronite Order on 15 August 1983 and was ordained a priest on 21 April 1991.

He pursued advanced studies in ecclesiology and Eastern Catholic Churches, earning a doctorate from the Pontifical Oriental Institute in Rome in 2008, with a focus on the theological identity and mission of Eastern Catholic Churches.

== Career ==
=== Early Curial and Academic Work ===
From December 2000 to July 2008, Jalakh served as Secretary Attaché at the then Congregation for the Oriental Churches. After completing his doctorate, he returned to Lebanon and assumed roles within the Antonian Maronite Order, including financial administration and teaching at the Antonian University and the Holy Spirit University of Kaslik. He authored books and articles on ecclesiology and the mission of Eastern Catholic Churches, including 'Ecclesiological Identity of the Eastern Catholic Churches: Orientalium Ecclesiarum 30 and Beyond' (Rome, 2014).

=== Ecumenical Leadership ===
In April 2013, Jalakh was elected Secretary General of the Middle East Council of Churches (MECC), serving until 2018. During his tenure, he engaged extensively in ecumenism and interfaith dialogue, and was appointed as an external expert on peacebuilding by the World Council of Churches and the Pontifical Council for Promoting Christian Unity, representing Middle Eastern Christian perspectives.

=== Rector of Antonine University ===
In 2017, he was appointed Rector of the Antonian University in Baabda, Lebanon. As rector, he promoted higher education initiatives in theology, philosophy, and interreligious dialogue.

== Roman Curia ==
On 15 February 2023, Pope Francis appointed Jalakh as Secretary of the Dicastery for the Eastern Churches, assisting the Prefect, Claudio Gugerotti.

On 8 March 2024, he was named Titular Archbishop of Nisibi of the Maronites, and receive an episcopal consecration on 8 June 2024.
