= National Evangelical Presbyterian Church of Latakia =

Evangelical Presbyterian church in Latakia, Syria

- الكنيسة الإنجيلية المشيخية الوطنية في اللاذقيّة
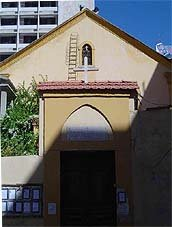
- Entrance to the church
- National Evangelical Presbyterian Church of Latakia
- 35°31′07″N 35°46′23″E
- Address: Latakia
- Country: Syria
- Denomination: Presbyterian
- Tradition: Evangelical

History
- Status: Church

Architecture
- Architectural type: Church
- Style: Byzantine Revival architecture
- Completed: 1876

The National Evangelical Presbyterian Church of Latakia is a church in Latakia, Syria. It is a member of the Synod of Syria and Lebanon. With a capacity of around 400, it is one of the biggest churches in Latakia, having approximately 1000 members. Weekly activities in the church include the main Sunday service and Sunday school on Fridays, in addition to Bible study and conferences. The church has many teams for Christian songs, theater, and football games.

== History ==
The National Evangelical Presbyterian Church in Latakia is one of the 20 churches in Syria affiliated to the National Evangelical Synod of Syria and Lebanon. In the 19th century, a large number of Western missionaries came to the Middle East, which was then under Ottoman rule. The missionaries began holding services in a large number of cities and villages in the area and set up schools, using local teachers, near the churches. In 1856, members of the Reformed Presbyterian Church and the Free Scottish Church came to Latakia. They are commemorated by cenotaph gravestones located in front of the church.

The first service in Latakia took place in 1859 in a rented house. In 1860 the first boys' school was opened, with kindergarten, elementary, and middle school classes offered. By 1876, the mission compound contained a three-storey girls' school, a chapel, and a hospital; by 1880 the mission also owned and ran various schools and buildings in the wider town and surrounding areas. The church itself, however, was not established until 1890.

The First World War left 100 of the church's 287 members missing. Most missionaries left Latakia during the war, when the Ottoman Empire was aligned with Germany. The church's position was improved when Syria became a French colony after the war. The Synod installed Rev. Khalil Awad at Latakia in 1921 as its first pastor of Syrian origin. After the Second World War new missionaries arrived, but the church's schools were soon closed by the government of the new Syrian Republic (1946–63).

In 2014 and 2020, the pastor of the church, Rev. Salam Hanna, spoke about the difficulties faced by the congregation in the Syrian Civil War. In 2023 the church sheltered people affected by the Turkey–Syria earthquakes and took part in relief and rebuilding efforts in the city.

== See also ==
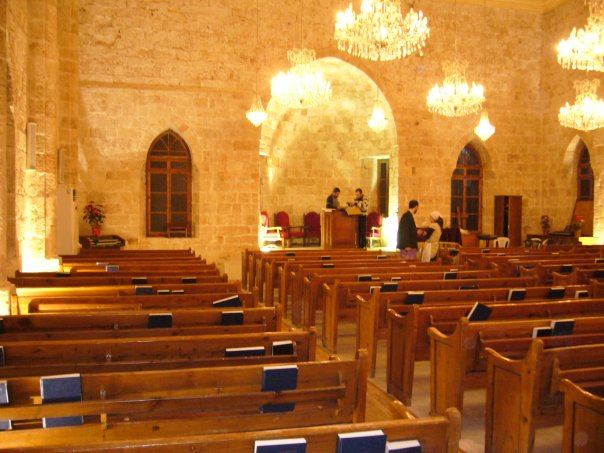
Inside the church

- Christianity in Syria
