= Evangelical Church of Egypt (Synod of the Nile) =

Evangelical church of Egypt

The Evangelical Church of Egypt (Synod of the Nile) (also called the Evangelical Presbyterian Church in Egypt, Arabic: الكنيسة الإنجيلية المشيخية al-Kanisah al-Injiliyyah al-Mashyykhia) is a Protestant church that started as a mission of the United Presbyterian Church of North America among Coptic Egyptians in the late nineteenth century. The Evangelical Church of Egypt became autonomous in 1957 and officially independent in 1958. It has eight presbyteries, 314 congregations, and about 250,000 members.

== Congregations and context ==
Emile Zaki is a pastor and also the general secretary of the Evangelical Presbyterian Church of Egypt, also known as the Synod of the Nile. The Synod of the Nile has about 250 congregations worldwide, including a few worshiping groups without their own building. It helps with running hospitals, clinics, social service and employment agencies, retreat centers, day schools, and its own seminary. The Evangelical Presbyterian Church founded the nation's first primary school for girls.

To train pastors the denomination maintains the Evangelical Presbyterian Seminary in Cairo. It is the oldest Protestant Seminary in the country.

These Evangelical Christians operate in a context far different from North America. Between 88 and 90 percent of Egyptians are Muslim. Of the 10-12% who are Christian, over 90-92 percent are Coptic Orthodox. The 8-10 percent of non-Orthodox Christians include Catholics and several Protestant groups. However, a steady trickle of Orthodox and Catholic Copts are joining the Evangelicals because they are seen as (among other things) less laden with heavy ritual, more generous with welfare and more flexible over marriage and divorce.

== Partners ==
The church is a member of the World Communion of Reformed Churches, Middle East Council of Churches, and the Egypt Council of Churches, which formed in February, 2013. A partner church is the Church of Scotland.

Among others, the Gustav-Adolf-Werk (GAW) as the Protestant Church in Germany Diaspora agency actively supports persecuted Protestant Christians in Egypt with aid projects.

The church currently claims to own property held by the Anglican Diocese of Egypt.

== Community ==
Evangelical Christians belonging to this group form a tight-knit community and share common rituals like serving as "Beit Feel" in Beit El-Salam in Agami and, more recently, going to Kasr El Dobara Evangelical Church camps known as Wadi Sports Camps. The early evangelicals played a role in Egypt's education and this was documented in Paul Sedra's book: From Mission to Modernity. The biggest evangelical church in Egypt is Kasr El Dobara Evangelical Church (KDEC). The most famous Evangelical choir in Egypt is "The Better Life Team." Rafiq Habib, the son of the former head of the Synod, Samuel Habib, was the Vice President of the Muslim Brotherhood's Freedom and Justice Party.

== Schools ==
The Synod owns 4 schools in Egypt: Ramses College, New Ramses College, British Ramses College and Al Salam school in Assiut (formerly known as Presley Memorial Institute, founded by former American Evangelical missionaries). The sons and daughters of the Egyptian Evangelical community tend to attend these schools.

== Media ==
Evangelicals of the Arab world (mainly Egypt and Lebanon) air most of their content on Sat-7.

== Famous Egyptian Evangelicals ==
- Maestro Nayer Nagui
- Actor Lotfy Labib

== See also ==
- Joseph Saber
- Egypt Council of Churches
- Middle East Council of Churches
- World Communion of Reformed Churches
