= Evangelical Lutheran Church in Jordan and the Holy Land =

Lutheran denomination

- Classification: Protestant
- Orientation: Lutheran
- Polity: Episcopal
- Leader: Imad Mousa Haddad
- Associations: LWF, Middle East Council of Churches, WCC
- Region: Jordan, Palestinian Authority
- Origin: 1959; Jordan
- Congregations: 6
- Members: 2,500
- Primary schools: 4
- Official website: http://www.elcjhl.org/

The Evangelical Lutheran Church in Jordan and the Holy Land (ELCJHL) is a Lutheran denomination that has congregations in Jordan and the Palestinian Authority. First recognized as an autonomous religious community by King Hussein in 1959, the church currently has 2,500 members in six congregations.

The current bishop is Imad Mousa Haddad, who was elected in the summer of 2017, and installed on January 11, 2026.

== History ==
=== Early history ===
The Evangelical Lutheran Church in Jordan and the Holy Land has its origins in the arrival of German and English Protestant missionaries to Jerusalem in the mid 19th century. Protestant missions had begun in the early 19th century, but Protestant Christians had no legal protection in the Ottoman Empire, unlike the Roman Catholics and Greek Orthodox, who were legally protected by treaty. In 1840, the King of Prussia, Frederick William IV sent his diplomat, Christian von Bunsen to present a proposal to Queen Victoria of the United Kingdom for the establishment of a joint Protestant bishopric under the protection of both Prussia and the United Kingdom.

An agreement was reached to establish a joint bishopric of the Anglican Church of England and the Evangelical Church in Prussia, comprising Lutheran, Calvinist and united Protestant congregations, known as the Anglican-German Bishopric in Jerusalem and this was facilitated by the passing of the Bishops in Foreign Countries Act 1841. The first Bishop was a Jewish convert, Michael Solomon Alexander, who arrived in 1842.

=== Early Lutheran mission ===
In 1851, Theodor Fliedner was invited to bring four deaconesses to begin a hospital and the first formal school for girls in the Levant, Talitha Kumi, was set up in Jerusalem. In 1860, Johann Ludwig Schneller set up the Syrian Orphanage in Jerusalem for children who were made homeless or orphaned by civil war in the region.

A provisional chapel for the use of the Prussian Protestants was erected in 1871 on land granted by Sultan Abdülaziz in the Muristan area of Jerusalem. Due to political and theological differences, the joint bishopric was finally abolished in 1886 and the Prussian Protestant mission continued work independently of the Anglicans. The German-origin Protestants focused primarily on social work and education while the Anglicans focused on evangelism.

In 1898, the newly constructed Church of the Redeemer was officiated by Kaiser Wilhelm II and served as the headquarters of the Prussian-heritage Protestant mission.

=== Autonomy and independence ===
After the Second World War the World Lutheran Federation (WLF) took care of the remnants of the German-initiated Protestant missions, combining Lutheran, Calvinist and united Protestant efforts. Due to the influence of the WLF the Lutheran aspect prevailed. In 1947, the Lutheran mission was granted autonomy from the Protestant Church in Germany and in 1959 was recognised as an autonomous religious community by King Hussein of Jordan. The church was then officially named the Evangelical Lutheran Church in Jordan (ELCJ). The ELCJ had by then grown beyond Jerusalem and had set up congregations in Ramallah and Amman to serve Lutheran Palestinians who were refugees of the Arab–Israeli conflict.

In 1974, the ELCJ joined the WLF and in 1979 the first Palestinian bishop, Daoud Haddad, was elected to lead the church. In 2005, the Synod of the ELCJ decided to rename the church to the Evangelical Lutheran Church in Jordan and the Holy Land to more accurately reflect the work and ministry of the church that spans Jordan, Israel and the Palestinian Authority.

Sally Azar was ordained on 22 January 2023 by the church, in a ceremony at the Church of the Redeemer in Jerusalem, making her the first female Palestinian pastor in the Holy Land.

== Structure ==
=== Bishop ===
The ELCJHL holds episcopal polity. The Bishop leads the central church structures and is the chief pastor. Bishops are consecrated within the historic Apostolic succession.

- 1979–1986: Daoud Haddad
- 1986–1997: Naim Nassar
- 1998–2018: Munib Younan
- 2018–2026: Sanid Ibrahim Zanar
- 2026: Imad Mousa Haddad

=== Congregations ===
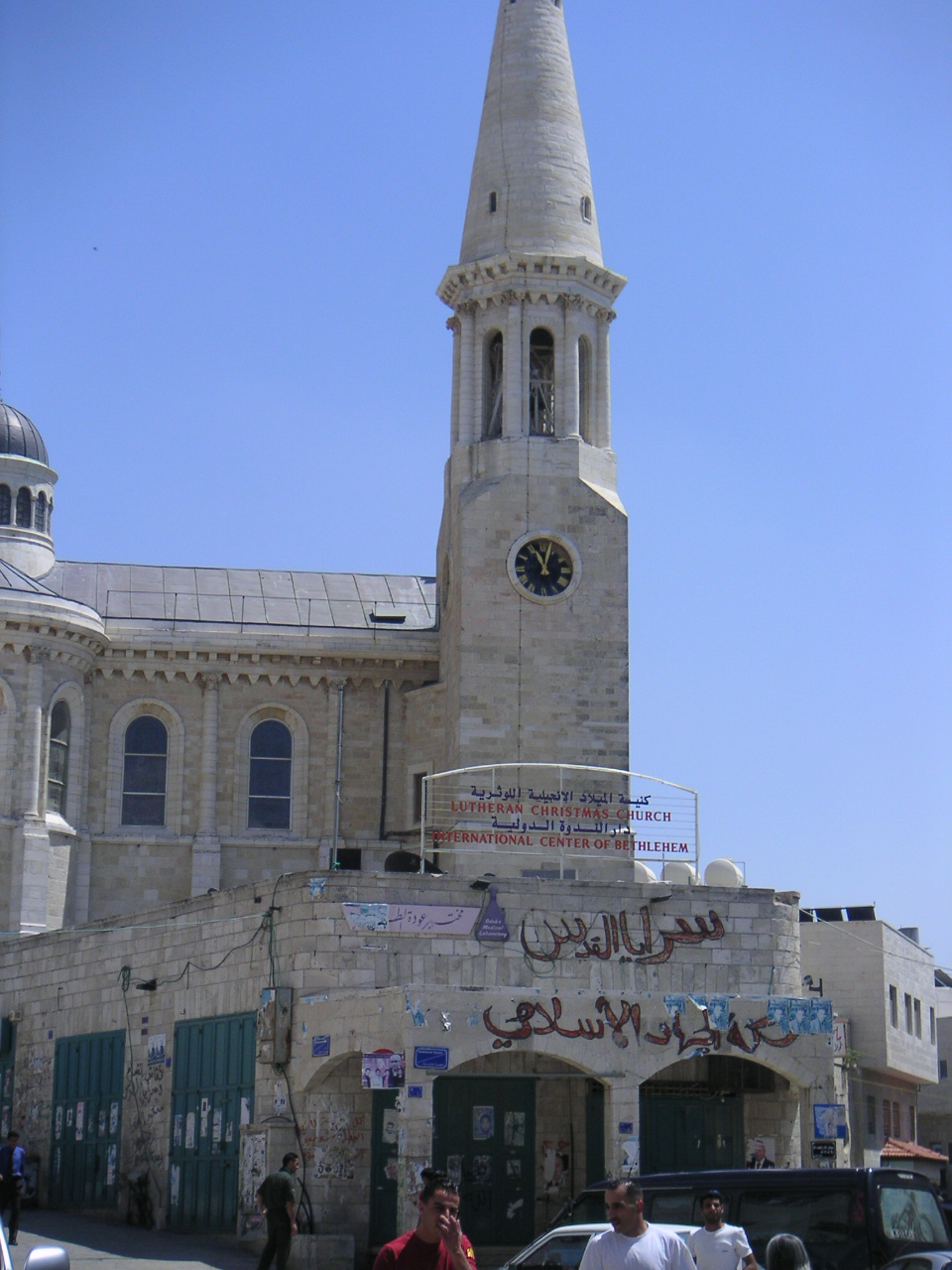
Christmas Church, Bethlehem

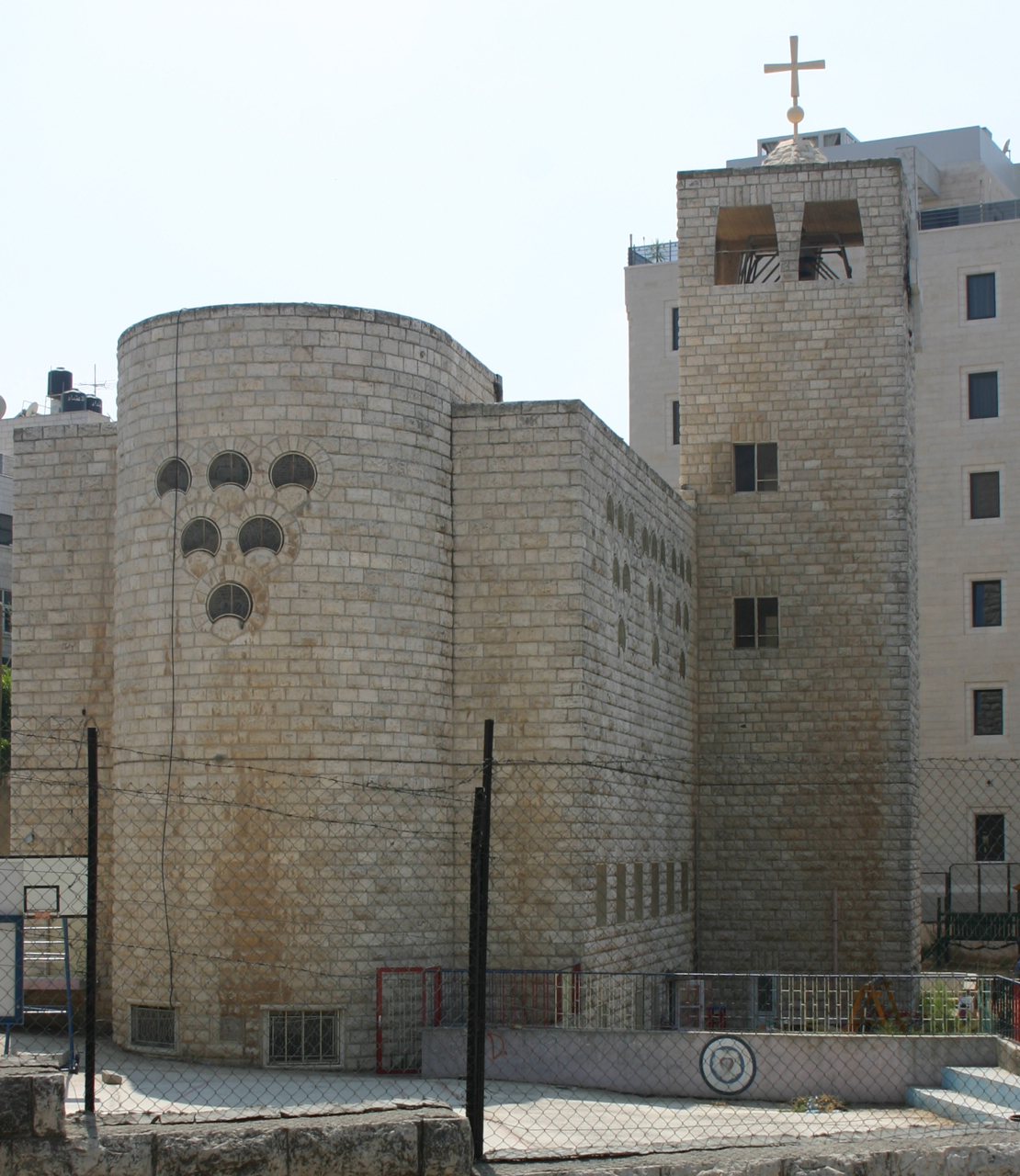
Church of Hope, Ramallah

At present, there are 6 congregations of the ELCJHL:

- Evangelical Lutheran Church of the Redeemer, Jerusalem
- Evangelical Lutheran Christmas Church, Bethlehem
- Evangelical Lutheran Church of Hope, Ramallah
- Evangelical Lutheran Church of the Reformation, Beit Jala
- Evangelical Lutheran Church, Beit Sahour
- Evangelical Lutheran Church of the Good Shepherd, Amman

== Schools and educational programs ==
The ELCJHL runs four primary schools and other educational projects that serve the broader educational needs of the Palestinian people as a whole. The four primary schools are:

- Dar al-Kalima Evangelical Lutheran School, Bethlehem
- The Evangelical Lutheran School, Beit Sahour
- The Evangelical Lutheran School of Hope, Ramallah
- Talitha Kumi Evangelical Lutheran School, Beit Jala

The ELCJHL also actively supports the Near East School of Theology in Beirut, Lebanon.

== Affiliations ==
The ELCJHL participates actively in ecumenical relationships through:

- Middle East Council of Churches
- Fellowship of Middle East Evangelical Churches
- World Council of Churches
- Lutheran World Federation
- Council of Religious Institutions in the Holy Land

The ELCJHL also works in partnership with:

- Evangelical Lutheran Church in America
- Evangelical Lutheran Church in Bavaria
- Evangelical Lutheran Church of Finland
- Church of Norway
- Church of Sweden

== See also ==
- Palestinian Christians
- Christianity in Jordan
- Christianity in Israel
- Anglican-German Bishopric in Jerusalem
