= Church of the Redeemer, Jerusalem =

Protestant church in Jerusalem

Coordinates: 31°46′40″N 35°13′50″E

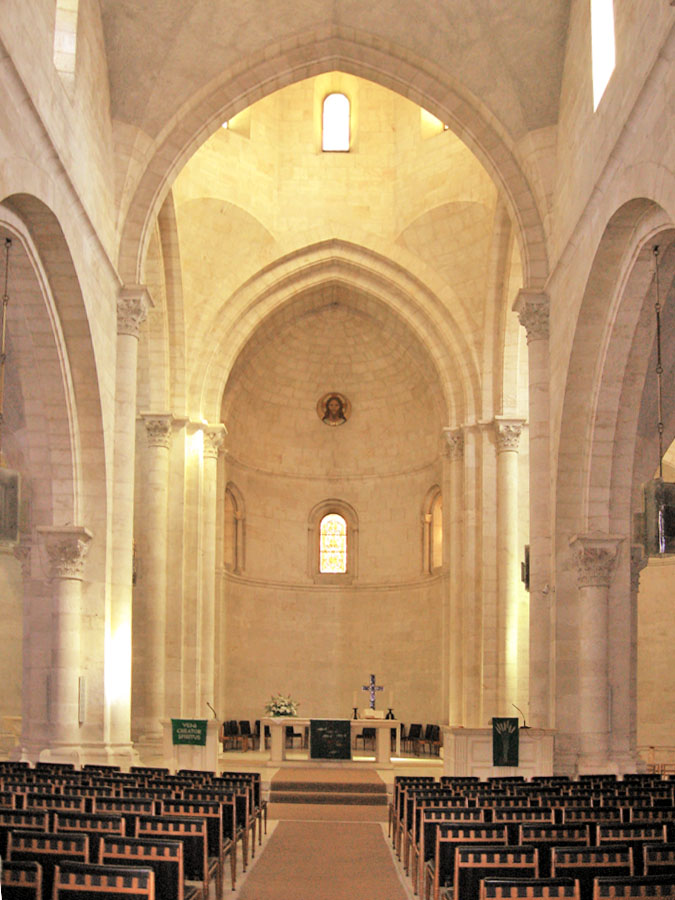
The interior of the Church of the Redeemer

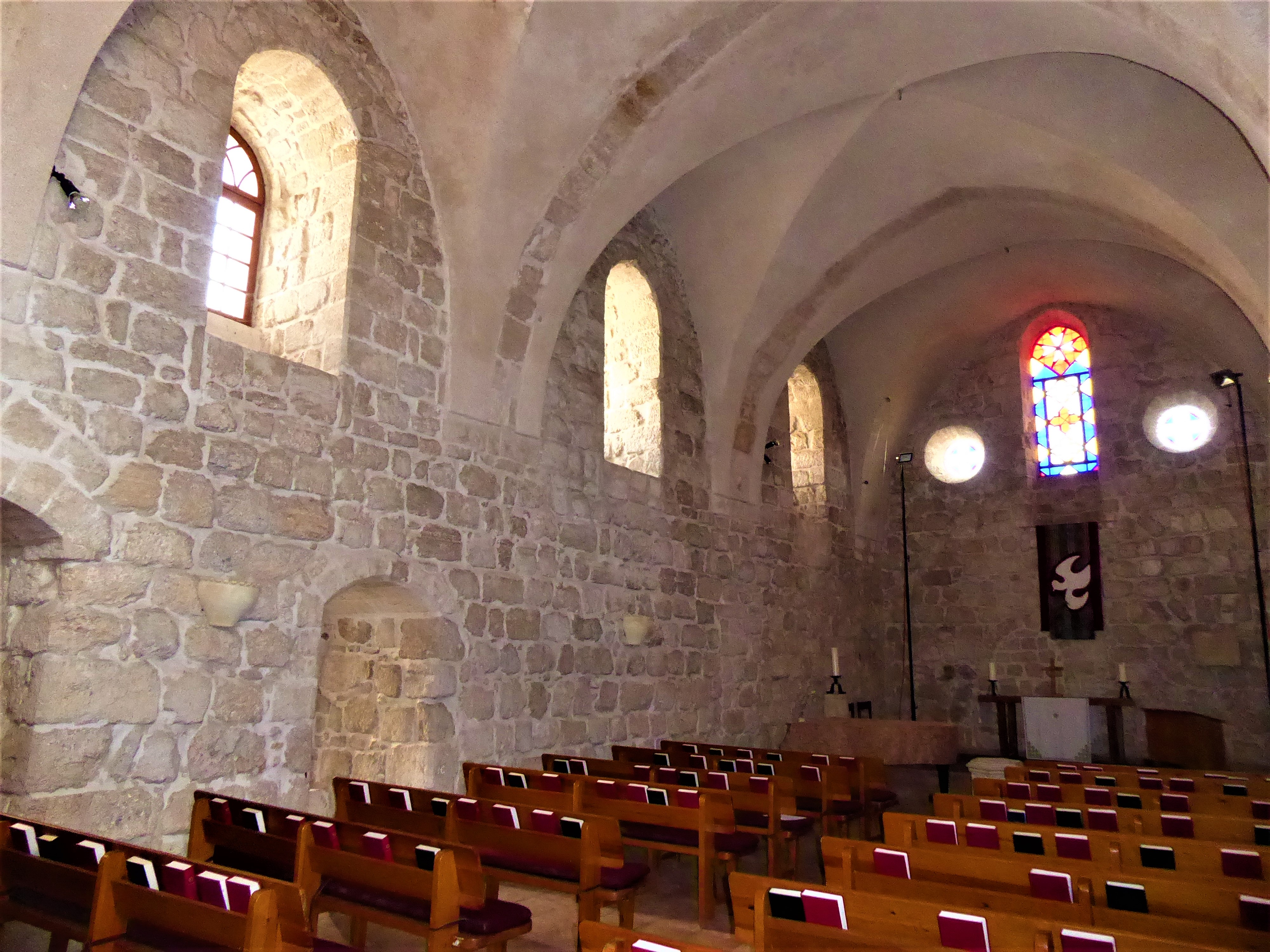
Chapel of St. John (Johanniterkapelle) at the Church of the Redeemer in Jerusalem

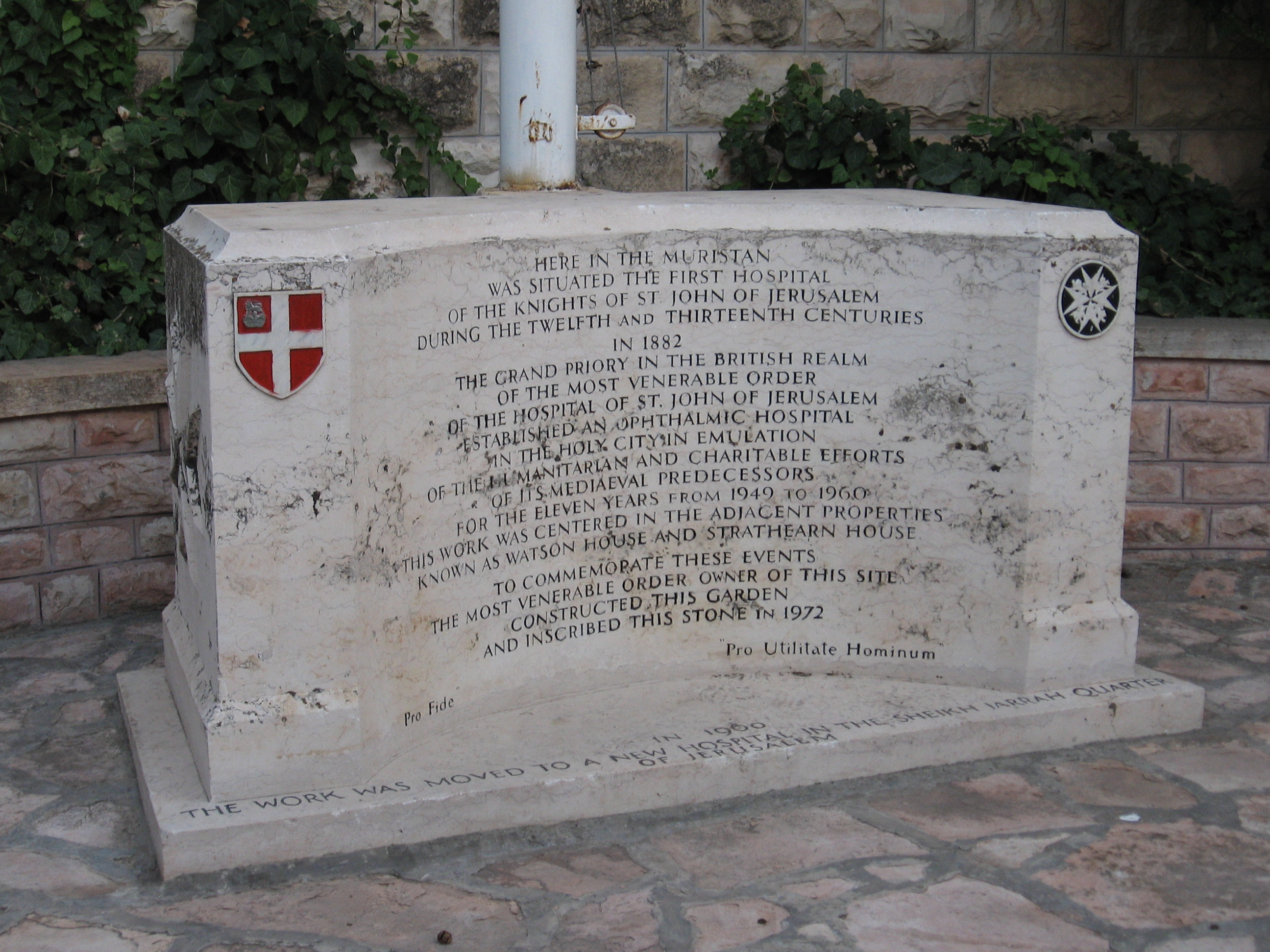
Plaque at the church marking the site of the Knights Hospitaller's first hospital

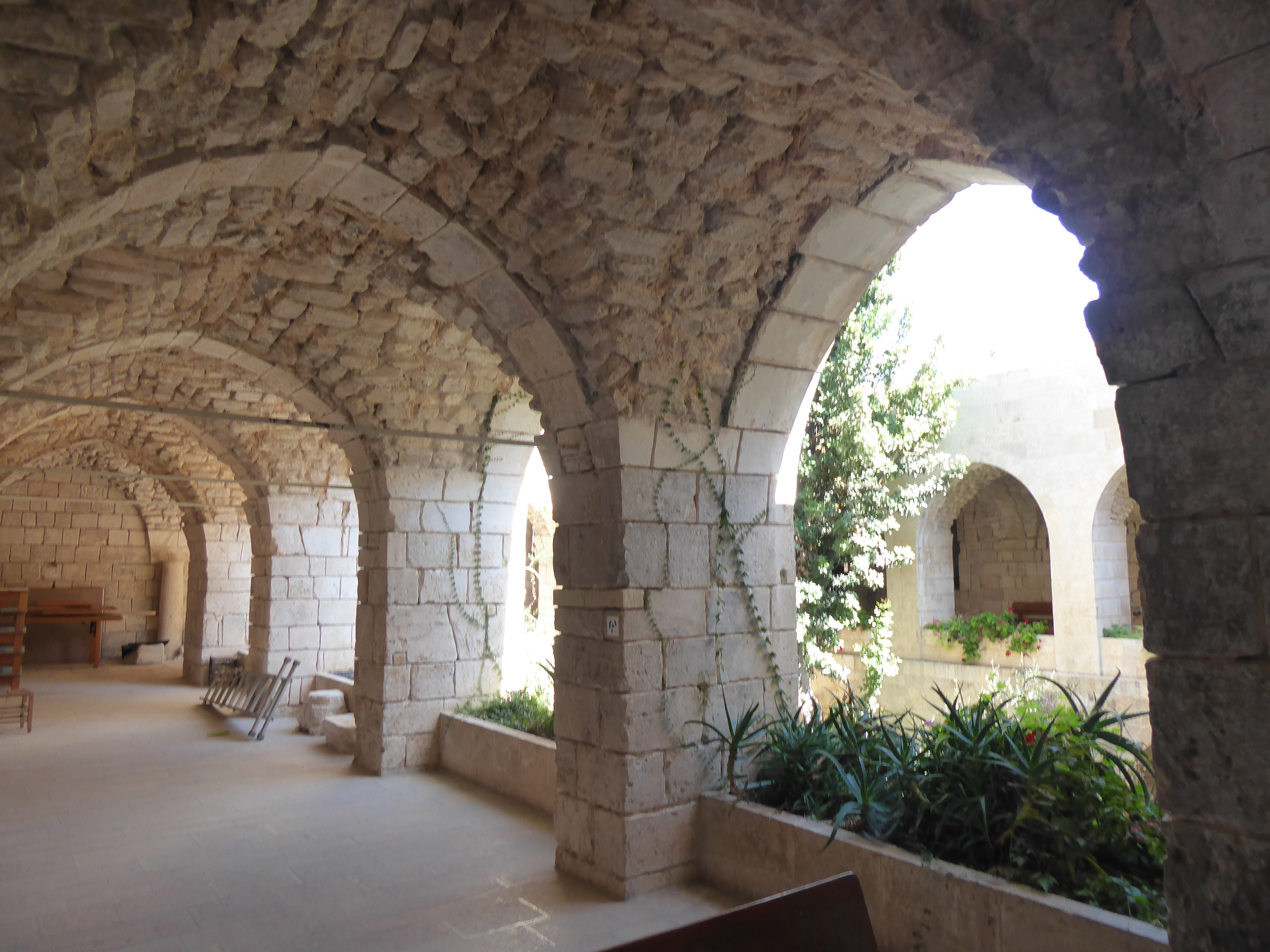
The cloister of the Church of the Redeemer

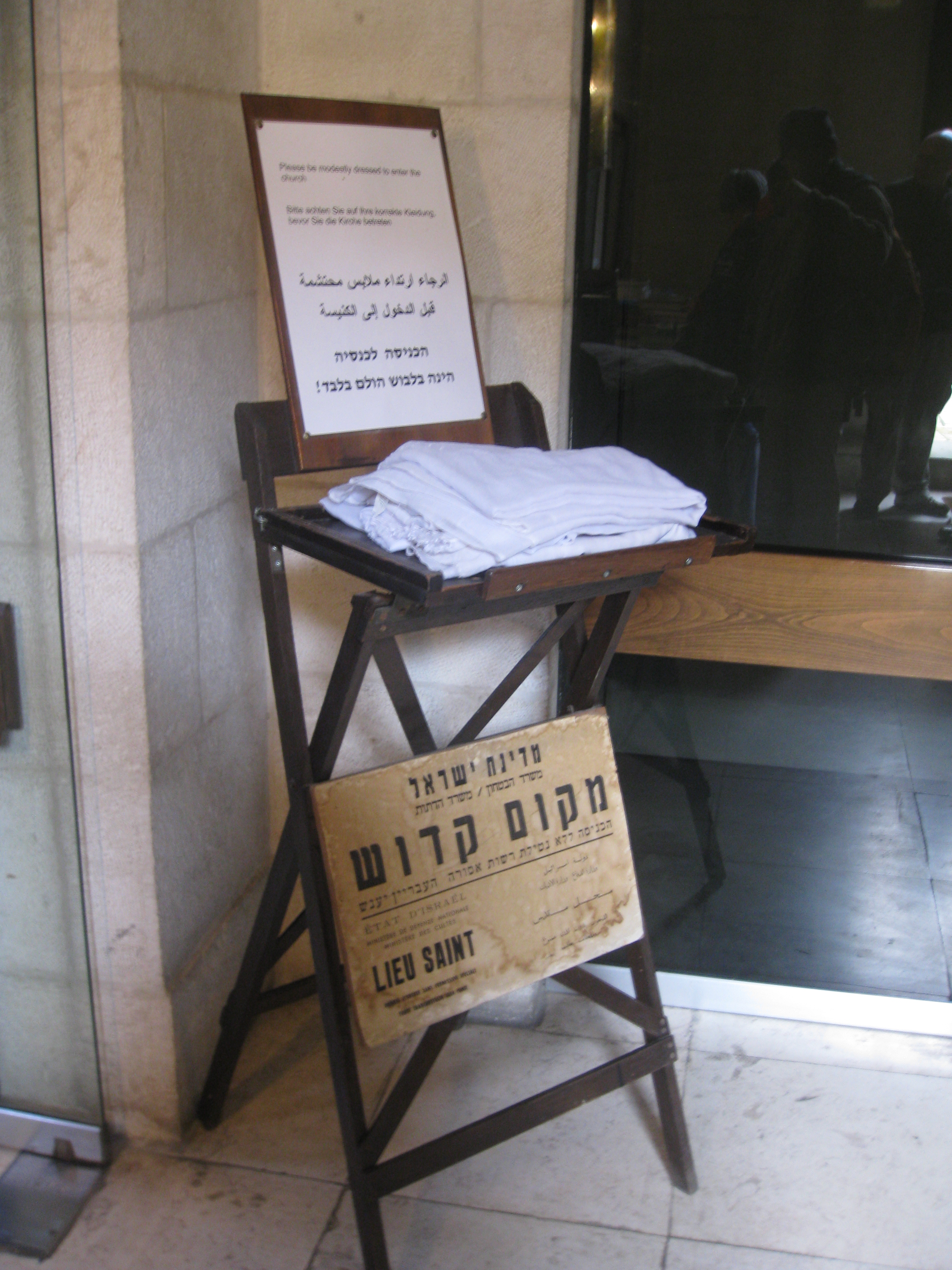
A sign indicated that the Church of the Redeemer is a Holy Place, enjoining modesty for those who enter therein

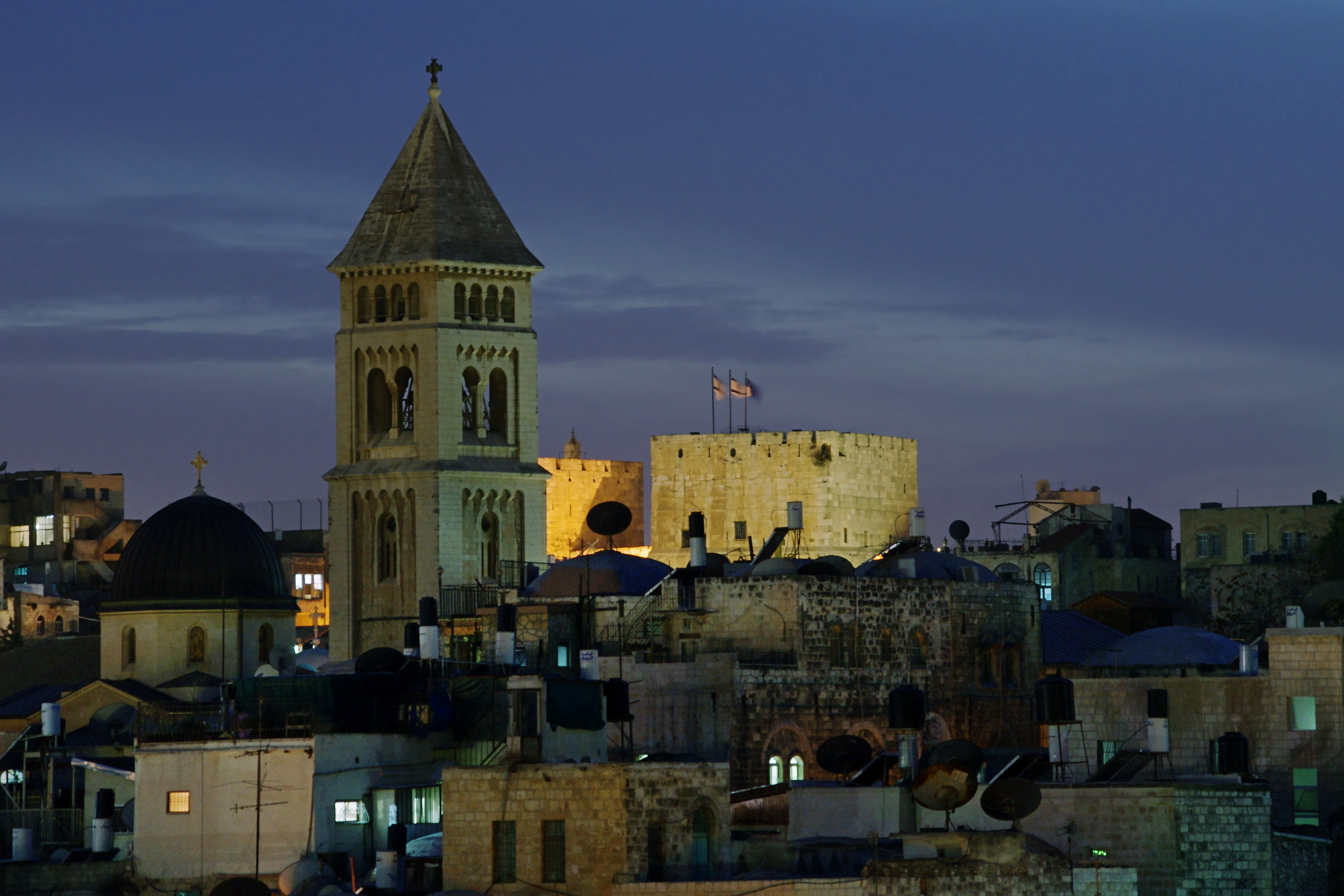
Bell tower of the Church of the Redeemer

The Lutheran Church of the Redeemer (Hebrew: כנסיית הגואל, romanized: Knesiyat HaGo'el; Arabic: الكنيسة اللوثرية في القدس, romanized: al-Kanīsa l-Lūthariyya fī l-Quds; German: Erlöserkirche) is a Lutheran-Protestant church in the Old City of Jerusalem. It is the property of the Protestant Jerusalem Foundation, one of the three foundations of the Protestant Church in Germany (EKD) in the Holy Land. Built between 1893 and 1898 by the architect Paul Ferdinand Groth following the designs of Friedrich Adler, the Church of the Redeemer currently houses Lutheran congregations that worship in Arabic, German, Danish, and English. The Church, together with the adjoining provost building, is the seat of the Provost of the German Protestant Ministries in the Holy Land ("Evangelisch in Jerusalem"). It also serves as the headquarters of the Bishop of the Evangelical Lutheran Church in Jordan and the Holy Land since this Arabic-speaking (Palestinian) church became independent from the German provost in 1979.

Built on land given to King William I of Prussia (after 1870 Kaiser Wilhelm I) on the occasion of the latter's participation at the inauguration of the Suez Canal in 1869 by Sultan Abdülhamid of the Ottoman Empire, the church was constructed from 1892 to 1898. The location had been the site of the old church of St. Mary Minor. In 1898 Kaiser Wilhelm II made a trip to Jerusalem to personally dedicate the new church. For the dedication of the church the Kaiser entered the city on horseback through two specially made ceremonial arches, one a gift of the Ottoman Empire. The church was dedicated on Reformation Day, 1898. At the dedication Wilhelm said:

From Jerusalem came the light in splendor from which the German nation became great and glorious; and what the Germanic peoples have become, they became under the banner of the cross, the emblem of self-sacrificing charity.

The Redeemer Church was closed for services from the end of May 1940 until 1950, when the Palestinian Lutheran congregation resumed services, and later the Protestant congregation of German language followed.

In the gardens of the Lutheran-Protestant Church of the Redeemer is a plaque marking the location of the first hospital of the crusader Order of the Knights of St. John, and the church contains a chapel dedicated to Saint John the Baptist. (Note: The Lutheran branches of the Knights Hospitaller today include the Order of Saint John (Bailiwick of Brandenburg) and the Order of Saint John in Sweden.) Directly adjacent to the Lutheran Church of the Redeemer is the Church of the Holy Sepulchre that marks the traditional site where Jesus was crucified.

== Pastors and provosts ==
The church ordained the first Palestinian female pastor in the Holy Land, Sally Azar, on 22 January 2023. Azar will head the English-speaking congregation in the church and be one of five ordained female leaders in the Middle East.

Notable pastors and provosts include:

- 1921 Gustaf Dalman
- 1921–1922 Albrecht Alt
- 1985–1991 Johannes Friedrich
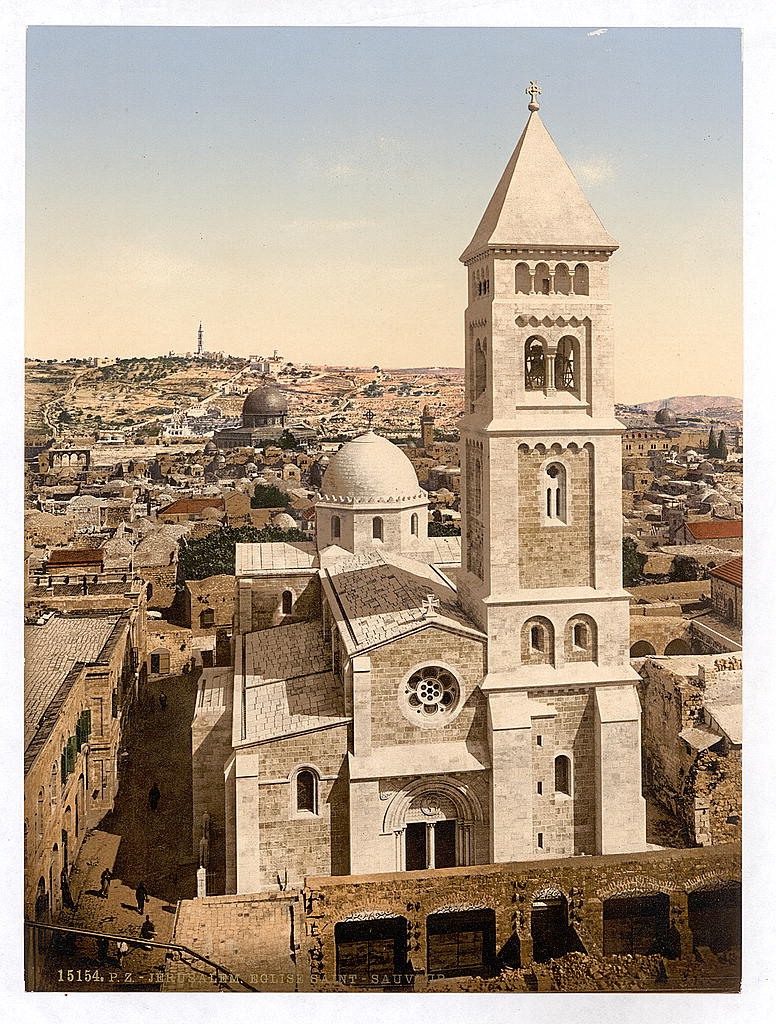
The church c. 1890s

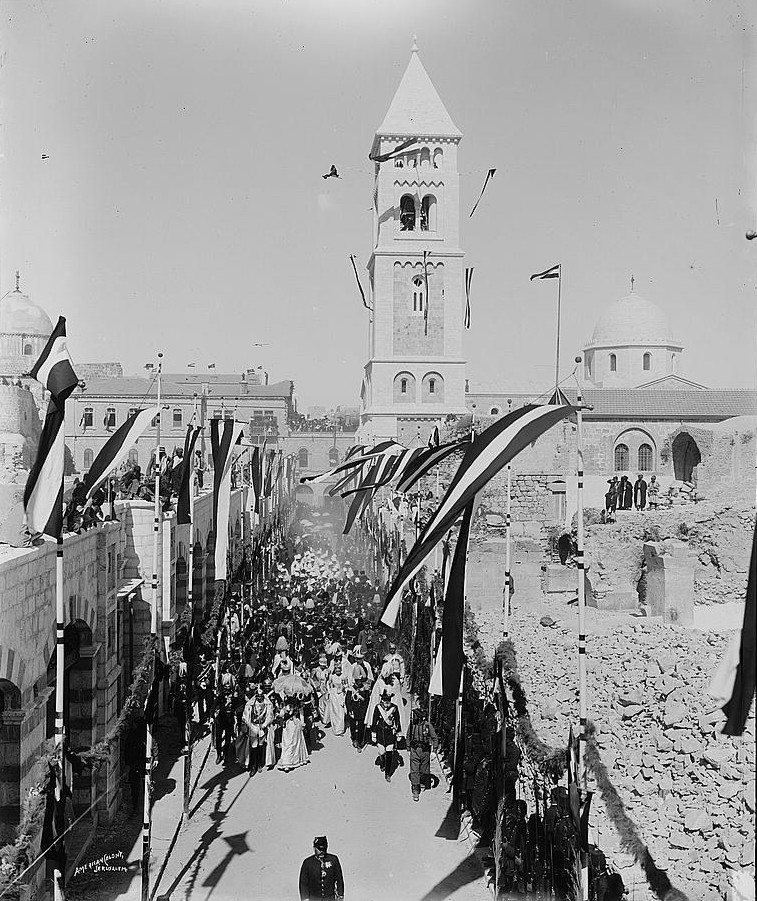
Emperor Wilhelm II and Empress Augusta Victoria after the church's inauguration, 31 October 1898.

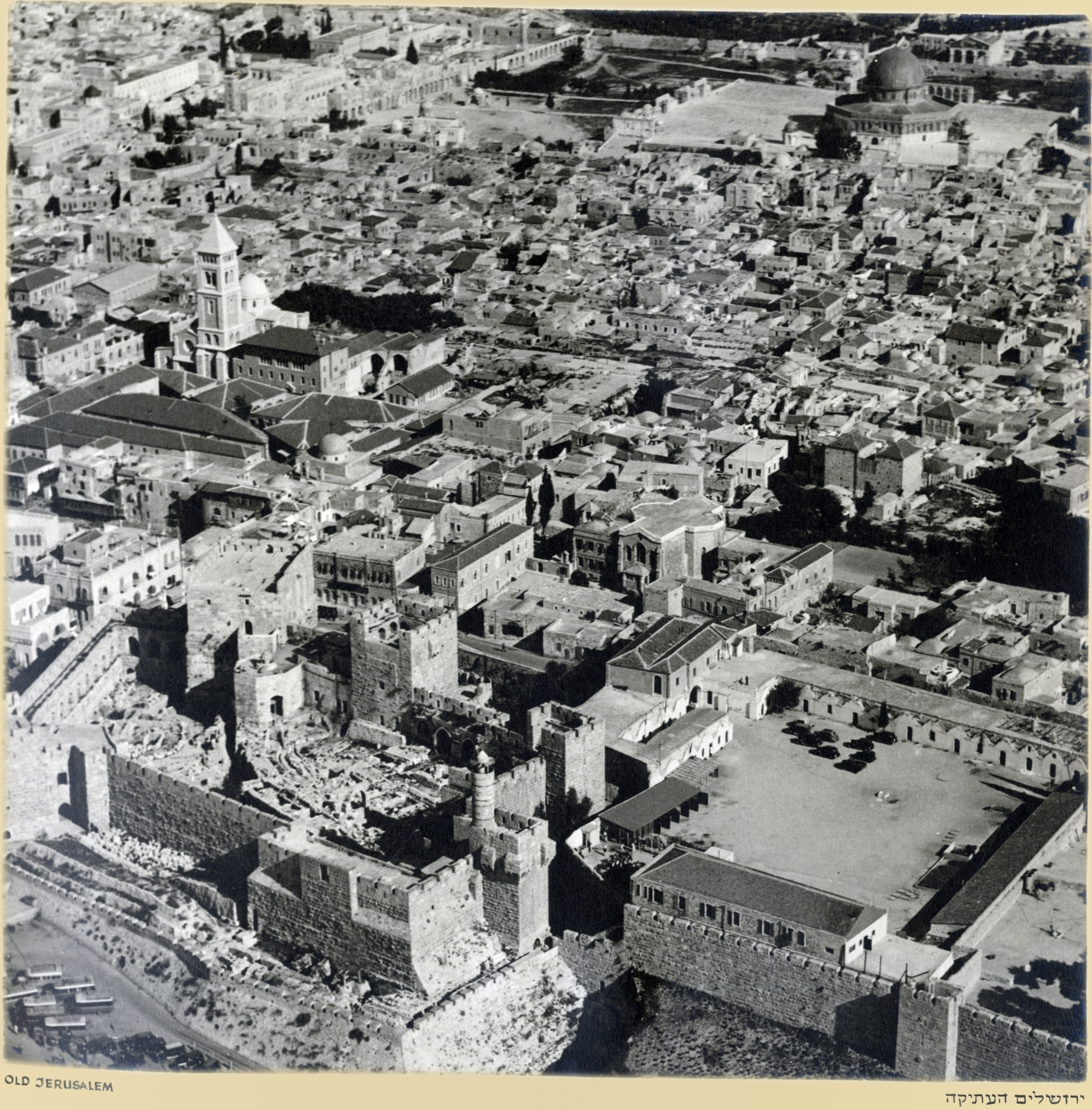
The church in 1937

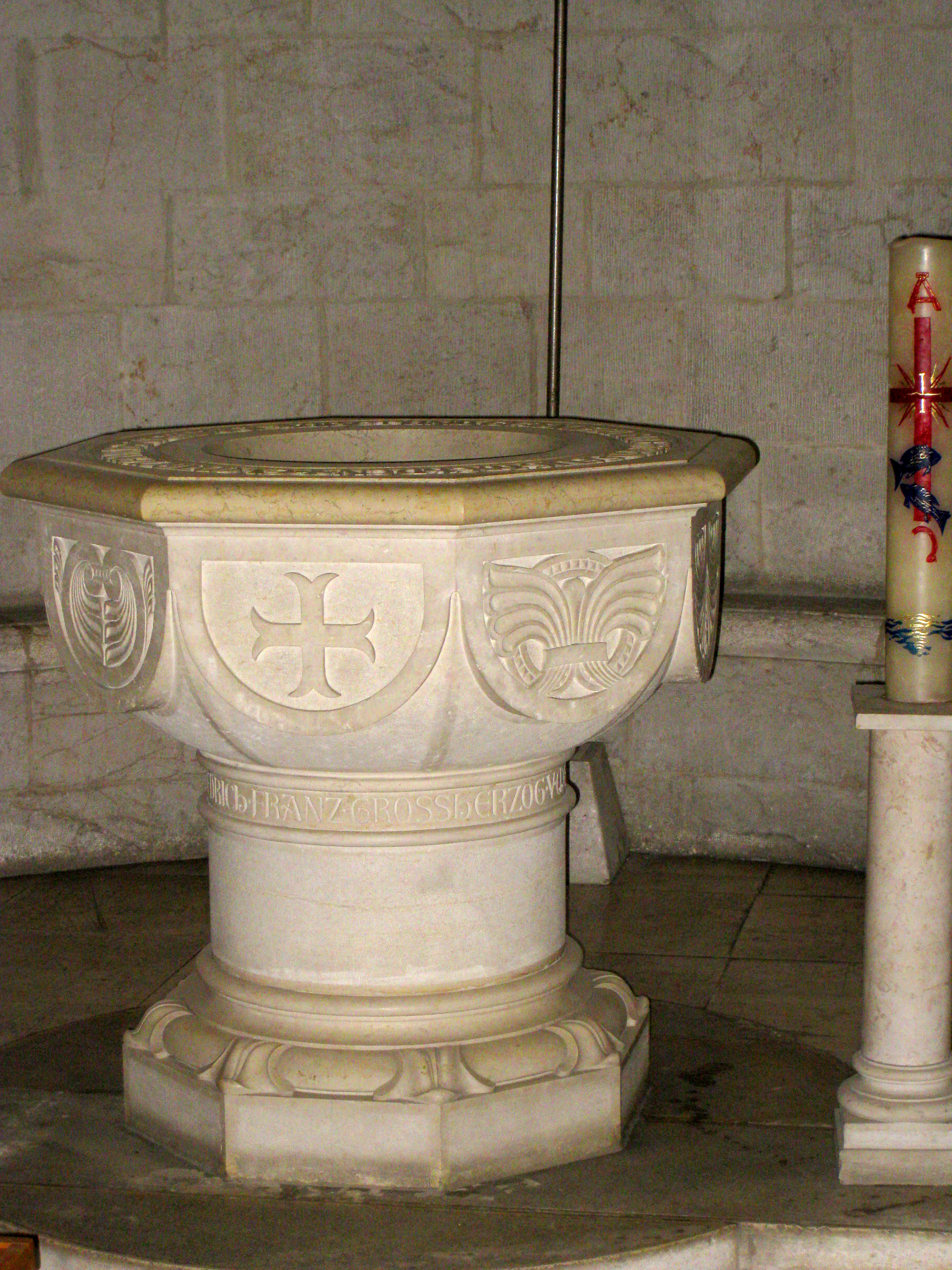
The baptismal font

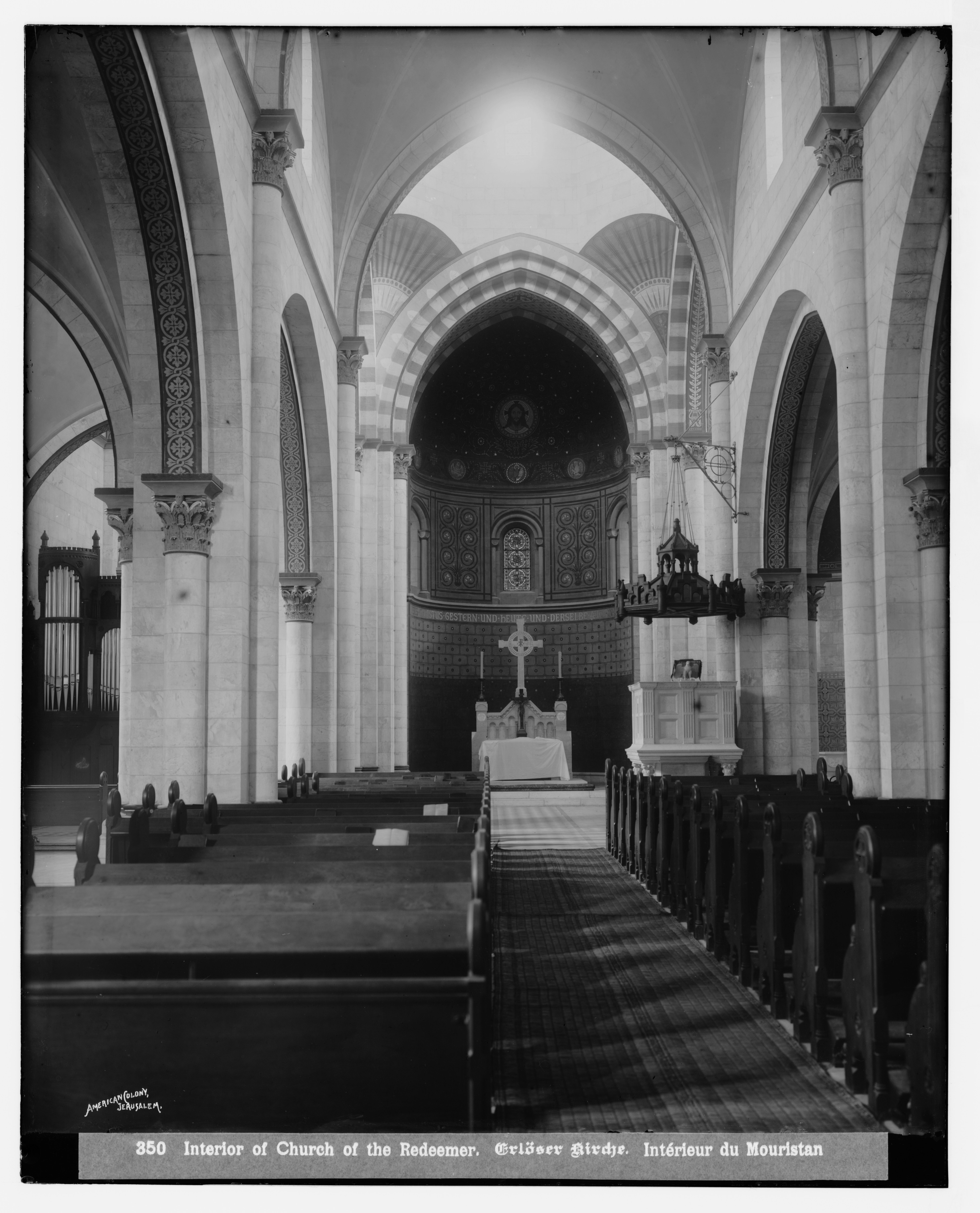
The church's chancel

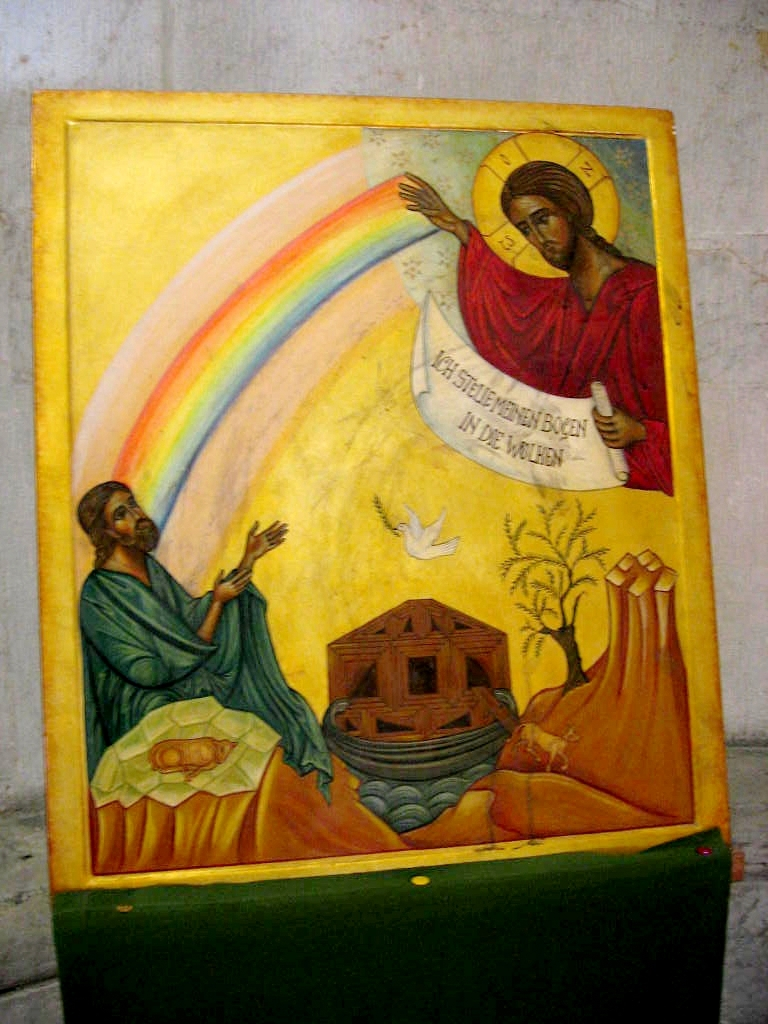
An icon of Jesus sending the Holy Spirit to Noah

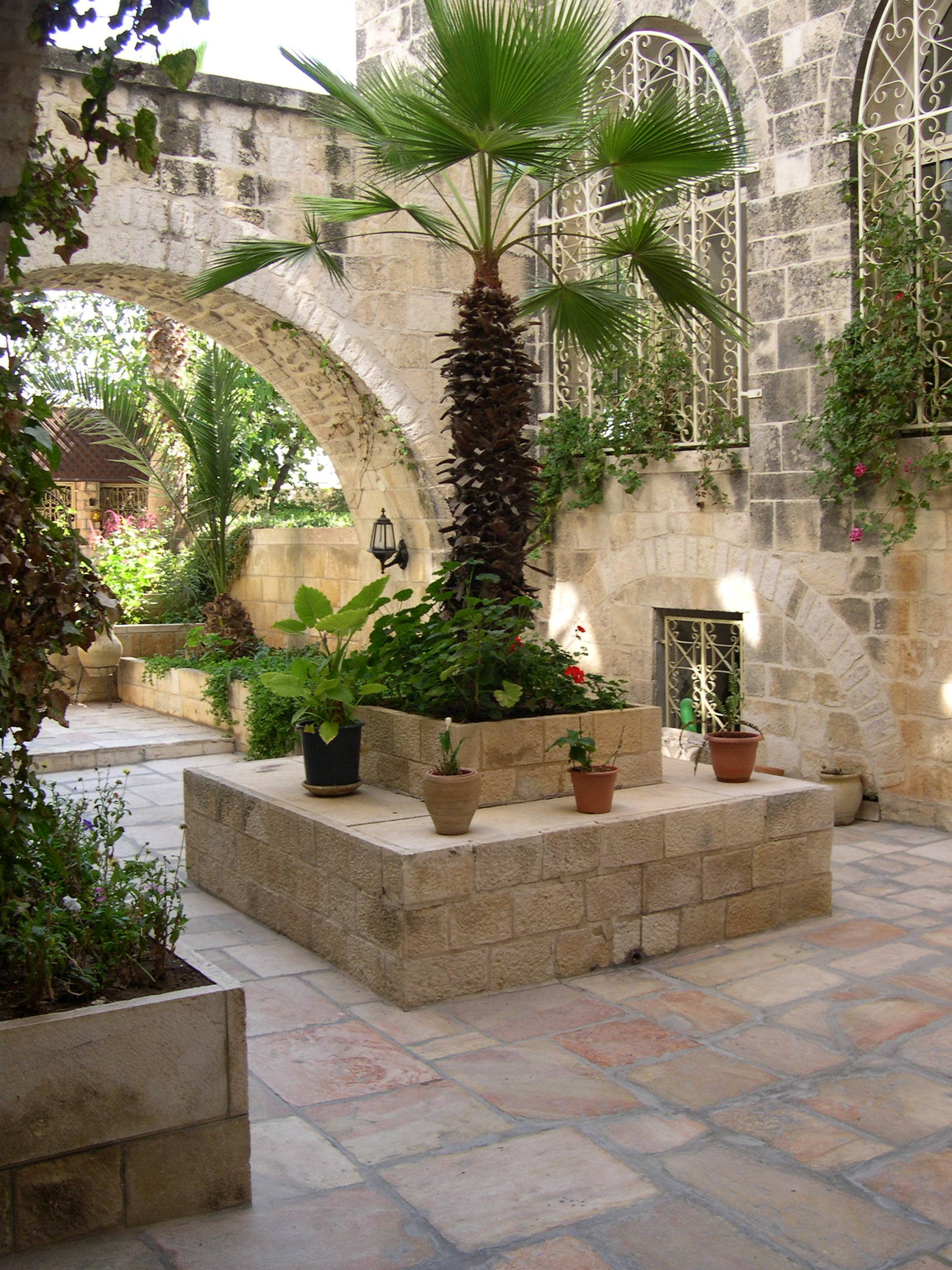
The central courtyard

== Place of Christian pilgrimage ==
For Christians of the Lutheran-Protestant faith, the Church of the Redeemer is a place of Christian pilgrimage. After visiting various holy sites in Jerusalem, Lutheran-Protestants visit the Church of the Redeemer to receive the sacrament of confession and partake in the offering of the Mass. The Church of the Redeemer plays an important role in Holy Week processions, including journeying on the Via Dolorosa, with pilgrims participating in them.

== See also ==
- Palestinian Christians
