= Near East School of Theology =

- Type: Theological seminary
- Established: 1932; 94 years ago
- Religious affiliation: Interdenominational Protestant
- Academic staff: 9
- Students: 40
- Location: Beirut, Lebanon

The Near East School of Theology (NEST), located in Beirut, Lebanon, is an interdenominational Reformed Protestant theological seminary serving Christian churches of the Middle East and North Africa, and also educates international students who have a special interest in Biblical and Islamic studies in a Middle Eastern context or those especially interested in the Ancient churches.

== History ==
The Near East School of Theology, formed in 1932 by the merger of the School for Religious Workers in Beirut and the School of Religion in Athens, is built upon a history of evangelical theological education in the Near East which goes back to 1835. In that year, Rev. William Thompson, later the author of The Land and the Book, founded in Beirut the first Protestant Seminary in the area. In 1843 the Seminary moved to Abey, in the mountain not far south of Beirut, under the leadership of Dr. Cornelius Van Dyck, translator of the Bible into Arabic. It offered classes in both theology and general education.

Out of the Abey Seminary grew, in 1866, the Syrian Protestant College, now the American University of Beirut. With the founding of the College, it was decided that the seminary pursue only theological studies, while the College be responsible for general studies. The Seminary had several locations in the subsequent years and, in 1905, moved back to Beirut .

In 1912, under Principal F. E. Hoskins, Colton Hall – a gift of Mr. Milton Colton of Jenkintown, Pennsylvania – was constructed on a piece of land near the center of the city and became the home of the N.E.S.T. until 1971.

In the meantime, as early as 1839, theological education was being offered in the area which is now Turkey, under the leadership of the Rev. Cyrus Hamlin, of the American Board of Commissioners for Foreign Missions, in Bebek and later in Marzifoon, Marash and Harput. However, because of the events which befell the Armenian population in the Ottoman Empire during World War I, these seminaries were closed and consolidated in the establishment of the School of Religion in Istanbul, with the Rev. Fred Goodsell as President. After the catastrophe of İzmir in 1922, the Armenian and Greek students of the School, together with Professor Loutfi Levonian, moved to Athens. In 1925, the Istanbul branch of the school was closed and the institutions were combined in the School of Religion in Athens.

In 1930, missionaries in the Near East, seeking to strengthen theological education in the area, proposed to unite the theological institutions in Athens and Beirut. In the spring of that year, after a period of negotiations between the Syria Mission (Presbyterian) and the Near East Mission (Congregational), an agreement was reached for the two schools to merge and form the new Near East School of Theology in Beirut. The merger was consummated on November 11, 1932, with Gaius Greenslade as Principal and Loutfi Levonian as Dean.

Following World War II, the two American Boards were joined by the National Evangelical Synod of Syria and Lebanon, the Union of the Armenian Evangelical Churches in the Near East (1945), the Diocese of Jerusalem of the Episcopal Church (1950) and the Lutheran Church in Jordan (1967).

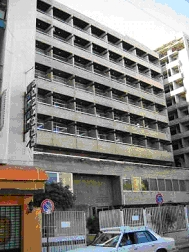
The Near East School of Theology's building

In 1971, the School moved to its new home: a modern, well equipped building, two blocks to the south of the American University of Beirut in Ras Beirut. The credit for this considerable achievement must go above all to the late President Hovhannes Aharonian, who, from 1959 and until his retirement in 1978, presided over the destiny of the School, and had served in other capacities for many years prior to that. On the occasion of his retirement, the Reverend Aharonian was named Honorary President.

The events of recent years in Lebanon have left their mark on the whole society and on every institution in the country. The N.E.S.T. too was adversely affected, especially through the loss of teaching faculty and the reduction of the student body to a third of its pre-war size. Nevertheless, the School was able to keep its doors open all through the troubles and is now attempting to rebuild its student body and to reach out in new directions. The first sign of this renewal is perhaps the revised curriculum for all degree programs which is included in this catalog, and was implemented as of October, 1991. The new curriculum is an attempt at updating the course offerings and the requirements in the various degree programs so as to meet the changes in the situation of the churches in this region, as well as to keep in line with the ecumenical renewal in theological education worldwide.

Near East School of Theology has published Theological Review, a semi-annual journal, since 1978.

== Profile ==
The NEST is an undergraduate and graduate theological seminary of some 40 students and seven full and two part-time faculty. The seminary offers the following programs: B.A. in Christian Education; B.Th. with emphasis in pastoral studies; B.Th. in Christian Education; M.A.C.E., a graduate program for educational ministries; M.Div. for Pastoral ministry; S.T.M., a post graduate research degree; and the S.T.M. in Ministry established jointly with McCormick Theological Seminary in Chicago.

The seminary is housed in a modern building with classrooms, offices, faculty and student lounges, dining facilities, sanctuary and chapel, coffee shop, dormitory rooms for 50 students, six faculty apartments and a gymnasium and theater which are under construction. The library contains 42,000 volumes in Arabic, Armenian, English, French and German.

== Church relationship ==
The NEST is under the auspices and support of three mainline Protestant Evangelical churches in the Middle East, the National Evangelical Synod of Syria and Lebanon, the Union of the Armenian Evangelical Churches in the Near East, and the Evangelical Lutheran Church in Jordan and the Holy Land; as well as one historic church the Episcopal Church in Jerusalem and the Middle East of the Anglican Communion. These four local churches jointly sponsor the N.E.S.T. and enjoy the full cooperation and support of Associate Members, all of whom are represented on the Board of Managers.

== See also ==
- Protestantism in Lebanon
