= Middle East Council of Churches =

Religious organization

The Middle East Council of Churches (MECC) was inaugurated in May 1974 at its First General Assembly in Nicosia, Cyprus, and now has its headquarters in Beirut, Lebanon. Initially it consisted of three "families" of Christian Churches in the Middle East, the Eastern Orthodox Churches, the Oriental Orthodox Churches and the Evangelical Churches, which were joined in 1990 by the Catholic Churches of the region. It is a regional council affiliated with the mainstream ecumenical movement which also gave birth to the World Council of Churches, of which the MECC is also a member.

The MECC is headed by a Secretary General and supported by three Associate Secretaries General. Its four co-presidents each represent the four church families.

The MECC is composed of two program categories: Core Programs and Service Programs.

The MECC has offices in Cairo and Amman, with liaison offices in Damascus, Jerusalem and Tehran. Through the membership of its four Church families, the MECC works in over 14 countries from Northern Africa, the Levant, Iraq, Iran and the Persian Gulf, representing 14 million Christians.

== History ==
The MECC was founded in May 1974 at its first General Assembly in Nicosia, Cyprus with the stated purpose to "deepen the spiritual fellowship among the churches of the Middle East, and to unite them in word and deed." From the outset, the MECC adopted the model of "families of churches". The Eastern Orthodox, the Oriental Orthodox and the Protestants were the three founding families. In 1990 the Catholic Church's Latin Church and Eastern Catholic Churches joined, collectively constituting the same family on the council. Each family is equally represented in the governing bodies and the general assembly, and decides on its own representation. The MECC initially had three co-presidents, representing each of the Christian "families", becoming four after the Catholic Church joined in 1990.

The first Secretary General of the MECC from 1974 to 1977 was the Reverend Albert Istero. He was succeeded by Gabriel Habib, from 1977 to 1994. In November 1994, the Reverend Dr. Riad Jarjour was elected Secretary General. He was replaced after two terms by Guirgis Saleh, a Coptic Orthodox theologian and professor, at the Eighth General Assembly in 2003 and served until 2011, at which point Father Boulos Rouhana, of the Maronite Church, was appointed. The term of Father Boulos Rouhana was cut short when he was appointed to the position of Bishop in the Maronite Church. Following a transitional period, Father Dr. Michel Jalakh, also of the Maronite Church, was elected by the Executive committee in 2013 to serve as the sixth Secretary General of the Middle East Council of Churches.

== Member churches ==
The MECC is composed of four ecclesiastical families, together representing 14 million Christians in the Middle East.

=== Catholic ===
- Maronite Church
- Armenian Catholic Church
- Chaldean Catholic Church
- Coptic Catholic Church
- Greek Melkite Catholic Church
- Latin Patriarchate of Jerusalem, part of the larger Latin Church of the Catholic Church
- Syriac Catholic Church

=== Eastern Orthodox ===
- Greek Orthodox Church of Alexandria
- Greek Orthodox Church of Antioch
- Greek Orthodox Church of Jerusalem
- Church of Cyprus

=== Oriental Orthodox ===
- Holy See of Cilicia of the Armenian Apostolic Church
- Coptic Orthodox Church of Alexandria
- Syriac Orthodox Church of Antioch

=== Anglican ===
- Episcopal Church in Jerusalem and the Middle East
- Episcopal Church of Alexandria
- Episcopal Church of Sudan
- Episcopal Church of South Sudan

=== Lutheran, Reformed, and Evangelical ===
- Evangelical Church of Egypt (Synod of the Nile)
- Evangelical Church in Sudan
- Evangelical Lutheran Church in Jordan and the Holy Land
- Synod of the Evangelical Church in Iran
- National Evangelical Synod of Syria and Lebanon
- National Evangelical Union of Lebanon
- Presbyterian Church in the Sudan
- Union of the Armenian Evangelical Churches in the Near East
- Protestant Church of Algeria
- Reformed Church of Tunisia
- National Evangelical Church in Kuwait

=== Non-admission of the Assyrian Church of the East ===
All Christian traditions are represented at the MECC, except the Churches of the two councils resulting from the ancient Church of the East.

The Assyrian Church of the East made a first request for membership in 1985, recalling its oriental roots. This request was not accepted.

In 1994 (the year of the signing between Pope John Paul II and Patriarch-Catholicos Mar Dinkha IV of a “Common Christological Declaration," the proposal for admission of the Assyrian Church of the East into the MECC was not successful either, “due to the refusal of the Coptic Orthodox Church, which still considered the Assyrians as Nestorians, therefore as heretics.”

== Core Programs ==
The core programs of the MECC are those which directly contribute to its well-being and vision.

- Ecumenical Relations

The MECC serves as a bridge among Eastern Christians in the region. Its ecumenical relations program is deals with issues of Christian unity. The MECC provided the theme and developed the resources for the World Council of Churches/Pontifical Council for Promoting Christian Unity Week of Prayer for Christian Unity in 2022: We saw the star in the East, and we came to worship him (Matthew 2:2).

- Inter-religious Relations

MECC works with other religions in the region in its inter-religious relations program. It has historically been actively involved in Christian Muslim dialogue.

- Communications

The Communications Program is responsible for MECC publications. In the past it has published reports in three different languages: Arabic, French, and English.

- Documentation and Archives

The documentation and archive program makes historical and academic resources regarding the ecumenical movement in the Middle East available as a reference for ecumenical studies and research in order to preserve the historical memory of the ecumenical movement in the Middle East.

== Service Programs ==
Through its affiliated departments, the MECC is involved in humanitarian response and development work.

- Diakonia and Social Justice

The MECC Diakonia and Social Justice (DSJ) unit focuses on the protection and rights of migrants and refugees, specifically women and children, and their rights, life and dignity.

- Inter-Church Network for Development and Relief

The Inter-church Network for Development and Relief was founded in 1975 to respond to the needs across Lebanon. It is financially and administratively autonomous from the MECC. It provides psychosocial support, rights education and protection for children in Lebanon; psychosocial support for Syrian refugee women and children in Lebanon; and a food security program in Lebanon.

- Syrian IDPs Program

The Syrian IDPs program is a direct response to the war in Syria. The program, which is administered by the MECC Syria Office, distributes humanitarian assistance and rehabilitates water systems in schools to restore access to water and sanitation.

- Iraqi & Syrian Refugees Program

The Iraqi & Syrian Refugees Program is a program of the MECC Jordan office. It offers humanitarian aid as well as community development projects to Iraqi and Syrian refugees living in Jordan.

- Department of Services for Palestinian refugees

The Department of Services for Palestinian refugees was formed in 1951 to respond to the humanitarian crisis caused by the Arab-Israeli war of 1948. It has evolved into an organization which works in the West Bank, Gaza, Nazareth, Lebanon, Jordan.

== Patriarchs and Heads of Churches in Jerusalem ==
The churches present in Holy Land periodically share common statements dealing with current issues under the banner of the Patriarchs and Heads of Churches in Jerusalem. The churches represented are led by the Greek Orthodox Church of Jerusalem, the Armenian Patriarchate of Jerusalem, and the Catholics Latin Patriarchate of Jerusalem and Custody of the Holy Land. They are accompanied by the Coptic Orthodox Church of Alexandria, the Syriac Orthodox Church of Antioch, the Ethiopian Orthodox Tewahedo Church (not part of this council), the Greek Melkite Catholic Church, the Maronite Catholic Church, the Armenian Catholic Church, the Syriac Catholic Church, the Episcopal Church in Jerusalem and the Middle East and the Evangelical Lutheran Church in Jordan and the Holy Land.

== Criticism ==
=== Opposition to Christian Zionism and Restorationism ===
Christian Zionists, who have long represented a fragment of historic and contemporary Protestants, are characterised as those "distort the interpretation of the Word of God" and "damage intra-Christian relations".
