= National Evangelical Synod of Syria and Lebanon =

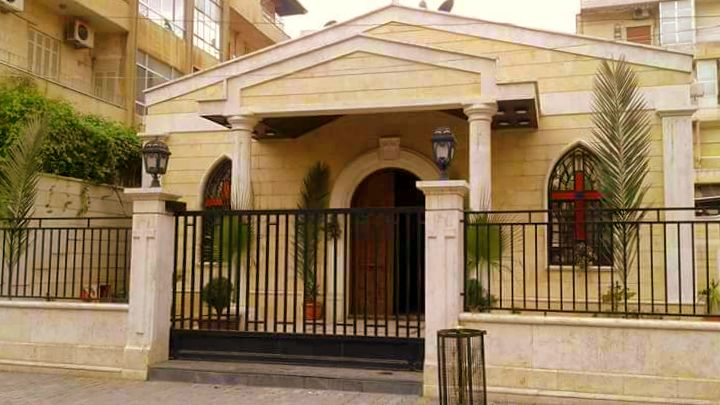

The National Evangelical Synod of Syria and Lebanon (NESSL), also known as Synod SL (of Syria and Lebanon), (in Arabic: السينودس الإنجيلي الوطني في سورية ولبنان, romanized: al-Sīnūdus al-Injīlī al-Waṭanī fī Sūriyā wa-Lubnān), is a Reformed denomination in West Asia. It is a federation of Arabic-speaking congregations, that trace back their origin to the evangelical revival in the 19th century. These churches adopted Reformed theology and Presbyterian church government. This Reformed revival was supported by many Reformed churches in the United States. The Ottoman authorities recognised the Protestant faith in 1848, the first congregations were founded in Beirut, Hasbaya. Later congregations were established in the major cities. The Synod was organised in 1920 with several Presbyteries. There has been a steady growth in new members in recent years.

The church supports and runs over 20 schools and kindergartens. In 2004 it had 8,000 members and about 60 congregations.

The Evangelical Synod in the Middle East is a member of the World Communion of Reformed Churches, the World Council of Churches and the Middle East Council of Churches.

The president of the National Evangelical Synod of Syria and Lebanon is Salim Sahyouni and the vice-president is Samuel Hanna. Mgrditch Karageuzian is the Synod's Secretary General.

== Affiliated churches ==
List of the Churches

=== Syria ===
- National Evangelical Presbyterian Church of Latakia
- The National Evangelical Church in Al Malkiyeh
- The National Evangelical Church in Al Quameshli
- The National Evangelical Church in Al Hasakeh
- The National Evangelical Church in Aleppo
- The National Evangelical Church in Edleb
- The National Evangelical Church in Al Ghassaniyeh
- The National Evangelical Church in Hamah
- The National Evangelical Church in Mhardeh
- The National Evangelical Church in Homs
- The National Evangelical Church in Feiruzi
- The National Evangelical Church in Al Hafar
- The National Evangelical Church in Amar Al Hoson
- The National Evangelical Church in Al Yazdiyeh
- The National Evangelical Church in Banias
- The National Evangelical Church in Al Gnaimiyeh
- The National Evangelical Church in Damascus
- The National Evangelical Church in Kharaba
- The National Evangelical Church in Ain Al Chaara
- The National Evangelical Church in Al Nabaq

=== Lebanon ===
- The National Evangelical Church in Minyarah
- The National Evangelical Church in Tripoli
- The National Evangelical Church in Hakour
- The National Evangelical Church in Al Rabieh
- The National Evangelical Church in Ras Beirut
- The National Evangelical Church in Al Mrouj
- The National Evangelical Church in Souk Al Ghareb
- The National Evangelical Church in Ain Zhalta
- The National Evangelical Church in Zahleh
- The National Evangelical Church in Kab Elias
- The National Evangelical Church in Kherbet Kanafar
- The National Evangelical Church in Saghbin
- The National Evangelical Church in Al Jmailiye
- The National Evangelical Church in Majdalona
- The National Evangelical Church in Sidon
- The National Evangelical Church in Darb El Sim
- The National Evangelical Church in Der Mimas
- The National Evangelical Church in Marjaaoun
- The National Evangelical Church in Ebel El Saki
- The National Evangelical Church in Aalma El Chaab
