= Elissa videography =

This is a list of Elissa's official music videos and TV and film appearances.

== Official music videos ==
| Year | Title | Album | Director | Language (Dialect) |
|---|---|---|---|---|
| 1998 | "Baddy Doub" (feat. Gerard Ferrer) | Baddy Doub | Marc Hadifé | Lebanese Arabic |
| 2000 | "W'akherta Maak" | W'akherta Maak | Marc Hadifé | Lebanese Arabic |
| 2001 | "Betghib Betrouh" (feat. Ragheb Alama)" | W'akherta Maak | Marc Hadifé | Lebanese Arabic |
| 2002 | "Lebanese Nights" (feat. Chris DeBurgh) | Timing Is Everything | Salim El Turk | English, Arabic |
| 2002 | "Ayshalak" | Ayshalak | Fabric Begotti | Egyptian Arabic |
| 2002 | "Ajmal Ihssas" | Ayshalak | Salim El Turk | Egyptian Arabic |
| 2004 | "Koul Youm Fee Oumri" | Ahla Dounya | Said El Marouk | Egyptian Arabic |
| 2005 | "Irjaa Lilshowk" | Ahla Dounya | Brandon Dickerson | Lebanese Arabic |
| 2005 | "Hobak Wajaa (Inta Lameen)" | Ahla Dounya | Salim El Turk | Lebanese Arabic |
| 2006 | "Bastanak" | Bastanak | Brandon Dickerson | Egyptian Arabic |
| 2007 | "Law Taarafou" | Bastanak | Yannick Saillet | Egyptian Arabic |
| 2008 | "Betmoun" | Ayami Bik | Waleed Nassif | Lebanese Arabic |
| 2009 | "Awakher Al Shita" | Ayami Bik | Waleed Nassif | Egyptian Arabic |
| 2010 | "Aa Bali Habibi" | Tesada'a Bemeen | Mazen Fayad | Lebanese Arabic |
| 2011 | "Tesada'a Bemeen" | Tesada'a Bemeen | Emile Salilati | Egyptian Arabic |
| 2013 | "Asaad Wahda" | Asaad Wahda | Salim El Turk | Egyptian Arabic |
| 2013 | "Teebt Mennak" | Asaad Wahda | Salim El Turk | Egyptian Arabic |
| 2014 | "Hob Kol Hayaty" | Halet Hob | Angy Jammal | Egyptian Arabic |
| 2015 | "Ya Merayti" | Halet Hob | Angy Jammal | Egyptian Arabic |
| 2016 | "Halet Hob" | Halet Hob | Angy Jammal | Egyptian Arabic |
| 2016 | "Saharna Ya Leil" | Saharna Ya Leil | Angy Jammal | Egyptian Arabic |
| 2017 | "Aaks Elli Shayfenha" | Saharna Ya Leil | Angy Jammal | Egyptian Arabic |
| 2018 | "Ila Kol Lli Bihibbouni" | Ila Kol Lli Bihibbouni | Angy Jammal | |
| 2018 | "Bokra Btechroq Shams El Aied" | Non-album single | Ghassan Al Sebaaly | |
| 2019 | "Krahni" | Ila Kol Lli Bihibbouni | Angy Jammal | |
| 2020 | "Hanghanni Kaman W Kaman" | Sahbit Raey | Eli Rezkallah | |
| 2021 | "Ya Am Salamtak" | Non-album single | Salim El Turk | |
| 2022 | "Min Awel Dekika" (feat. Saad Lamjarred) | Non-album single | Karim Bennis | |
| 2022 | "Ana W Bass" | Non-album single | Angy Jammal | |
| 2023 | "Batmayel Aala El Beat" | Non-album single | Angy Jammal | |
| 2024 | "Hobbak Metl Beirut" | Non-album single | Elie Fahed | |
| 2026 | "Kello Wahem" | Ana Sekketen | | |
| 2026 | "Chou Kan Biemnaak" | Ana Sekketen | | |
| 2026 | "Halali" | Ana Sekketen | | |
| 2026 | "Leebat Al Ayam" | Non-album single | Nadim Hobeika | |

== Filmography ==
- It's OK (2024)
