= Sahbit Raey =

Sahbit Raey صاحبة رأي

Studio album by Elissa
- Released: 1 August 2020
- Recorded: 2019–2020
- Studio: Hadi Sharara (Beirut); Michel Fadel; Metropolis (London); ART (Cairo); Raymond El Hajj
- Genre: Arabic; Arab pop
- Length: 72:22
- Label: Rotana

Elissa chronology
Ila Kol Elli Bihebbouni (2018)	Sahbit Raey صاحبة رأي (2020)	Ana Sekketen (2024)

Singles from Sahbit Raey
- 1. "Hanghanni Kaman W Kaman" Released: 11 April 2020; 2. "Ahwit El Madi" Released: 25 May 2020; 3. "Sahbit Raey" Released: 23 July 2020

20 Years special edition

Sahbit Raey (Arabic: صاحبة رأي) (English: A Woman's Opinion) is the twelfth studio album by Lebanese recording artist Elissa, released on 1 August 2020 by Rotana. Following her 2018 album Ila Kol Elli Bihebbouni, the album contains 18 tracks and was preceded by the release of three singles, including the titular single on 23 July 2020.

In the album's physical booklet, Elissa wrote that Sahbit Raey is to be her final album released by Saudi-based group Rotana, marking her departure from the label since signing in 2003. As a result, Rotana released a three-disc special box set CD featuring the album on the first disc, and twenty singles from her last eight albums split across the latter two.

== Background ==
In 2018, Elissa had announced on social media that recording sessions for her twelfth studio album had begun. However, on 19 August 2019, she posted on Twitter announcing her retirement; calling the Arab music industry "similar to the mafias" and that her then-upcoming album would be her last. Many fans and peers of Elissa reacted by sending support and paying tribute to her, along with trending hashtags such as "We Are All Elissa" (#كلنااليسا) as well as her name. Throughout late-2019 and early-2020, Elissa teased fans with new music by posting pictures of her and producers in studio; announcing titles of songs such as "Ala Hess Hikayetna" and "Habbit Ehtimam".

Later, it was revealed that she had retracted her intention to retire and reportedly began negotiations with Rotana.

== Release ==
On 11 April 2020, Elissa released the single "Hanghanni Kaman W Kaman" on digital streaming platforms. On the same day, a music video directed by Eli Rezkallah was published to Rotana's YouTube channel. As of December 2020, the music video has amassed over 10 million views. On 25 May, she released another single titled "Ahwit El Madi" and published a lyric video on YouTube on the same day.

In June, Elissa announced on a social media post that her album would be released on Eid al-Adha. On 20 July, she announced the name of her album titled Sahbit Raey as well as the lead single of the same name, which was released three days later. The album was released exclusively on Deezer and other streaming platforms a week later. Upon unveiling the album's title and cover, Elissa stated on the aforementioned social media post saying:

"I faced a lot of criticism when I first began my singing career. However, my father taught me not to be afraid and to face my destiny. I celebrate 20 years of success and I thank God, and my conscience is relieved. Why? Because instead of being a victim, I decided to be a woman with an opinion."

== Track listing ==
No.	Title	Lyrics	Music	Producer	Length
1.	"Sahbit Raey" (A Woman's Opinion)	Ousama Mostafa	Samer Abou Taleb	Hadi Sharara	3:48
2.	"Aghanina" (Our Songs)	Mohammed Kayati	Mohammed Yehia	Adel Haqqi	4:07
3.	"Azima" (Brilliance)	Nader Abdallah	Mohammed Rahim	Ahmad Ibrahim	4:45
4.	"Wafi" (Loyalty)	Ali Mawla	Yasim Jamal	Camil Khoury	3:44
5.	"Moubaha Lik" (Accessible to You)	Bahaa Eddine Mohammed	Zaim	Noor	4:18
6.	"Habbit Ehtimam" (A Drop of Attention)	Amir Teima	Ziad Burji	Ibrahim	4:39
7.	"Ala Hess Hikayetna" (Spirit of Our Story)	Ramy Gamal	Ramy Gamal	Wissam Abdel Meneim	4:37
8.	"Haatebrak Mot" (Consider You Dead)	Mohammed	Madian	Ahmed Abdel Salam	3:16
9.	"Ghaltet Waet" (Mistake in Time)	Ayman Komeiha	Komeiha	Khoury	3:48
10.	"Ana Chebh Nsitak" (I Have Almost Forgotten You)	Teima	Walid Saad	Ibrahim	4:36
11.	"Hanghanni Kaman W Kaman" (We'll Sing Again and Again)	Shady Nour	Yehia	Elham Deheima	3:46
12.	"Smaany" (Listen to Me)	Mostafa	Abou Taleb	Georges Kassis	3:09
13.	"Lek Liwahdak" (For You Alone)	Mostafa	Yehia	Abdel Salam	3:09
14.	"W Enta Osadi" (When You're Beside Me)	Malak Adel	Madian	Abdel Salam	3:35
15.	"Eli Allah" (I Have God)	Omar Sary	Mohammed Bashar	Khoury	4:18
16.	"Benheb El Hayat" (We Love Life)	Nasr Mahrous	Mohammed Rahim	Amir Mahrous	4:39
17.	"Ahwit El Madi" (Coffee of the Past)	Siham Chaacha	Rahim	Khoury	4:36
18.	"Mourir sur scène" (Dalida cover)	Michel Jouveaux; Jeff Barnel		Michel Fadel	3:24
Total length:					72:22

"20 Years special edition" box set - Disc 1
No.	Title	Original album	Length
1.	"Halet Hob"	Halet Hob (2014)	5:08
2.	"Aa Bali Habibi"	Tesada'a Bemeen (2009)	5:22
3.	"Ya Merayti"	Halet Hob (2014)	4:30
4.	"Kermalak"	Bastanak (2006)	4:59
5.	"Fi Ouyounak"	Asaad Wahda (2012)	4:31
6.	"Betmoun"	Ayami Bik (2007)	4:04
7.	"Sallimli Aleh"	Tesada'a Bemeen (2009)	4:48
8.	"Nefsi A'ollo"	Ila Kol Lli Bihibbouni (2018)	5:32
9.	"Maktooba Leek"	Saharna Ya Leil (2016)	5:16
10.	"Law Taarafou"	Bastanak (2006)	4:16

"20 Years special edition" box set - Disc 2
No.	Title	Original album	Length
11.	"Aaks Elli Shayfenha"	Saharna Ya Leil (2016)	4:26
12.	"Ya Rait" (From the 2016 series "Ya Rayt")	Saharna Ya Leil (2016)	4:32
13.	"Teebt Mennak"	Asaad Wahda (2012)	5:03
14.	"Krahni"	Ila Kol Lli Bihibbouni (2018)	4:50
15.	"Koul Youm Fee Oumri"	Ahla Dounya (2004)	5:22
16.	"Ayami Bik"	Ayami Bik (2008)	4:40
17.	"Bastanak"	Bastanak (2006)	3:57
18.	"Asaad Wahda"	Asaad Wahda (2012)	4:36
19.	"Ila Kol Elli Bihebbouni"	Ila Kol Lli Bihibbouni (2018)	5:20
20.	"Saharna Ya Leil"	Saharna Ya Leil (2016)	4:16

== Personnel ==
Adapted from the album liner notes.

- Jean Nakhoul - executive producer
- Elie Barbar - sound engineer, mixing (tracks 1, 2, 3, 5, 6, 7, 8, 10, 11, 12, 13, 14), mastering (track 11)
- Ledes Díaz - backing vocals (track 2)
- Sherif Fahmi - guitar (track 2)
- Ledos Diaz - Spanish vocals (track 2)
- Mohamed Sika - bass guitar (tracks 3, 6, 10)
- Hamuso - clarinet (track 3)
- Mostafa Aslan - guitar (tracks 3, 5, 6, 10)
- Tamer Ghoneim - leader (tracks 3, 6, 10)
- Mohammed Ads - recording (tracks 3, 5, 6, 10)
- Alain Oueijan - guitar (track 4)
- Mostafa Nasr - guitar (tracks 4, 7, 8, 9, 14, 15)
- Edouard Meunier - mixing (tracks 4, 9, 15, 17, 18)
- Ihab Jamal - strings (tracks 4, 9, 15)
- Ahmed Ragab - bass guitar (track 5)
- Said Kamal - strings (track 5)
- Ahmad Ibrahim - strings (tracks 6, 10, 11)
- Hasan Said - strings (tracks 7, 8, 13, 14)
- Ammar Khater - recording (tracks 8, 13, 14)
- Wael Najjar - accordion (track 11)
- Oussama Hasan - bouzouki (track 11)
- Ahmad Hussein - guitar (track 11)
- Ahmad Rocket - guitar (track 13)
- Nadim Rouhana - accordion (track 15)
- Sam Amelian - saxophone (track 15)
- Amir Mahrous - mixing (track 16)
- John Davis - digital mastering
- Eli Rezkallah - photographer
- Mandy Merheb - fashion consultant
- Bassam Fattouh - make up
- Yehya Chokr - hair
