= Best of Elissa =

Greatest hits album by Elissa
- Released: 12 April 2011
- Recorded: 2004–2009
- Genre: Arabic Pop; World
- Length: 47:46
- Label: Rotana Records

Elissa chronology
Tesada'a Bemeen (2009)	Best of Elissa (2011)	Asaad Wahda (2012)

Best of Elissa (Arabic: من أجمل أغاني إليسا) is the first official greatest hits album by Lebanese pop singer Elissa, released by Rotana on 12 April 2011. The compilation features singles from her Rotana albums Ahla Dounya (2004), Bastanak (2006), Ayami Bik (2007) and Tesada'a Bemeen (2009).

== Track listing ==
Standard edition
No.	Title	Original album	Length
1.	"Salimly Alayeh"	Tesada'a Bemeen (2009)	4:48
2.	"Betmoon"	Ayami Bik (2007)	4:05
3.	"Aa Baly Habibi"	Tesada'a Bemeen (2009)	5:23
4.	"Kermalak"	Bastanak (2006)	4:59
5.	"Law Ta'rafouo"	Bastanak (2006)	4:14
6.	"E'sha Oel Salam"	Tesada'a Bemeen (2009)	5:48
7.	"Ayami Beek"	Ayami Bik (2007)	4:40
8.	"Bastanak"	Bastanak (2006)	3:57
9.	"Law Nerja' Sawa"	Ahla Dounya (2004)	4:37
10.	"Erja' Lil Shouk"	Ahla Dounya (2004)	5:15
Total length:			47:46
