= Tesada'a Bemeen =

Tesada'a Bemeen تصدق بمين

Studio album by Elissa
- Released: 26 December 2009
- Recorded: August 2008–2009
- Studios: Audio Vision (Beirut); Elias Rahbani (Antelias); Hadi Sharara (Beirut); Nasser El Asaad; Talkies; Leila (Cairo)
- Genres: Arabic pop; World
- Length: 60:38
- Label: Rotana Records
- Producers: Hubert Ghorayeb (exec.); Claude Chalhoub; Tamim; Jad Rahbani; Michel Fadel; Nasser El Assaad; Walid Sharaky

Elissa chronology
Ayami Bik (2007)	Tesada'a Bemeen تصدق بمين (2009)	Best of Elissa (2011)

Singles from Tesada'a Bemeen
- 1. "Tesada'a Bemeen" Released: 16 December 2009; 2. "Aa Bali Habibi" Released: 16 June 2010

Tesada'a Bemeen (Arabic: تصدق بمين) (English: Who Do You Believe In?) is the seventh studio album by Lebanese singer Elissa, released by Rotana on 26 December 2009. This is her fourth album released by Rotana Records. Elissa won her third World Music Award for best selling artist of the Middle East in recognition of the sheer success of the album's commercial performance. With the release of second single "Aa Bali Habibi", the song experienced immense success and is considered to be Elissa's signature song.

== Background ==
In 2004, Elissa signed to Saudi-based entertainment group Rotana Records and released her fourth album titled Ahla Dounya and her fifth titled Bastanak in 2006; both garnering World Music Awards (in 2005 and 2006 consecutively) due to their commercial success. Her previous album Ayami Bik was released in December 2007 to moderate success. In August 2008, Elissa announced her intentions to travel to Egypt to meet and work with songwriters for her then-upcoming album on Rotana's tabloid news. Elissa collaborated with composers such as Nader Abdullah, Marwan Khoury, Mohammed Rahim, Jad El Rahbani and Tamer Ali. She enlisted Tamim, Walid Shiraki, Claude Shalhoub, Michel Fadel, Jad El Rahbani and Naser El Assaad as music arrangers. The cover of the album was shot by photographer Matthias Clamer on location at Pena National Palace in Sintra, Portugal. Clamor photographed Elissa for two of her previous albums.

== Composition ==
In comparison to Elissa's preceding albums, Tesada'a Bemeen features more of a darker, dramatic and mature sound. The album boasts stronger vocal delivery and lyrical content as well as containing some brighter pop-oriented songs. Lebanese singer-songwriter Marwan Khoury contributed three songs on the album after additionally writing Elissa's 2008 single "Betmoun" from her preceding album Ayami Bik. Mohammed Rahim, who wrote Elissa's 2002 track "Ajmal Ihssas", wrote the tracks "Eftakart" and "W Byestehi". Waleed Saad, who composed "Khod Balak Alaya" (from Ayami Bik) additionally composed three tracks, including the title track.

Lyrically, Tesada'a Bemeen predominantly speaks about love. However, the album is known to feature more orchestral and dramatic themes in contrast to brighter and light-hearted synth-pop and electronic-like influences such as titular track "Tesada'a Bemeen" and "Ma'ash Walakan", with the latter boasting 80's pop-like influences. The songs "Fi Shi Nkassar" and "Eftakart" speak of a strained relationship with an ex-lover while tracks like "W Byestehi", lead single "Aa Bali Habibi" and "Ma Ta'arafchi Lei" speak of being in a loving romantic relationship with someone. The track "Sallimli Aleh" introduces rich, oriental influences descending from Elissa's songs "Kermalak" and "Betmoun". The thirteenth and final song on the album "Masdoma" contains traditional Arabic instruments and strings with lyrics that talk about a resentful lover.

Almost immediately after the album was released, the third track "Min Gheir Mounasba" garnered severe attention by the media, general public and fans alike due to the song containing lyrical content about domestic violence and emotional abuse. This had marked one of the first occasion that Elissa decided to record a track with mature content in order to raise concern and spread unprecedented awareness to Middle Eastern audiences. The song speaks of a female victim who attempts to escape a deceiving and abusive ex-lover who attempts to emotionally manipulate her in order for her to stay within a toxic relationship. Many groups praised Elissa for speaking up against domestic violence within the Arab media scene, which previously had not been done before and additionally would have been considered taboo at the time, as well as noting the two men who composed the song; Nader Abdullah and Waleed Saad.

The eighth track "Law Feye" is a cover of the 1970s song by Aida Chalhoub, however attracted some controversy after Elissa's management team allegedly failed to gain permission from Chalhoub for including the cover on the album. Elissa's management noted that the cover was included in memory of Lebanese singer Salwa Al Katrib; who had died in March 2009. It is rumoured that Elissa dubbed her as "[the] late Aida Chalhoub" in a television interview, for which Chalhoub claims she had not apologised to her for that remark.

== Reception and commercial performance ==
Tesada'a Bemeen was released on 26 December 2009 to massive commercial success. The album was reported to have sold over 150,000 copies on its first day of release and later an estimated 700,000 copies in its first week, becoming one of Rotana’s fastest selling albums of all-time. Among the 700,000 copies sold, 300,000 of them accounted from cassette tapes while the remaining copies were from physical CD sales. The release of Tesada'a Bemeen alone tremendously boosted revenue from Egyptian cassette manufacturers after being severely affected by the 2008 financial crisis. According to local tabloids, Rotana issued more than five batches of pressings for the album during its early days of release. In France, the album topped the Fnac store album charts for more than two weeks. Various outlets reported that the album was still charting more than a year after the album's release, including retailers such as Virgin Megastores in Lebanon.

Upon release, the album was subject to critical acclaim by Arabic media tabloids, with constant reassurance that Tesada'a Bemeen is one of Elissa's best albums yet. Many Egyptian newspapers additionally noted Elissa's maturing voice in this album and that her romantic and classic style was improving and gaining distinction with each album she would release.

== Promotion ==
Rotana successfully attempted a big advertising campaign for Tesada'a Bemeen. The campaign was very noticeable in major cities like Beirut and Cairo whereas other Arab cities lacked such promotion due to Elissa's music being written for Lebanese and Egyptian audiences. Elissa promoted the album all over the Middle East and appeared on various TV shows for interviews and mini-concerts. She performed various songs from the album in a New Year's Eve concert at the Semiramis InterContinental Hotel in Garden City, Cairo, Egypt.

== Singles ==
- "Tesada'a Bemeen" was the first single to be serviced to radio. The track premiered on 17 December 2009 on Rotana Radio. "Tesada'a Bemeen" debuted at #2 on Njoom FM Radio charts and also debuted at #1 on Rotana Delta Radio charts. The song ranked at #4 in Fiflan Best Songs of 2009. A video for the song directed by Emile Seliati premiered in October 2011, more than one year after its initial release.
- "Aa Bali Habibi": Rotana News confirmed that "Aa Bali Habibi" was to be serviced as a single and that Elissa decided to shoot a music video for the song. The music video director was initially rumoured to be Waleed Nassif, who filmed Elissa's two last music videos from her preceding album, Ayami Bik. However, Elissa confirmed through a magazine interview that the director of the single was Mazen Fayad, who had previously worked with Rola Saad. The music video premiered on Rotana Mousica on 17 June 2010. The music video depicts Elissa as a bride in preparation for a wedding as the story of her and a lover envelops. A beige-colored dress worn by her in the video was designed by Lebanese fashion designer Elie Saab.

== Track listing ==
Standard edition
No.	Title	Lyrics	Music	Arranger	Length
1.	"Tesada'a Bemeen" (Who Do You Believe In?)	Nader Abdullah	Waleed Saad	Tamim	4:37
2.	"Aa Bali Habibi" (I Want to, Darling…)	Fares Iskandar	Salim Salameh	Claude Chalhoub	5:22
3.	"Min Gheir Mounasba" (For No Reason)	Abdullah	Saad	Walid Sharaky	4:49
4.	"Amri La Rabbi" (I'll Leave It to God)	Marwan Khoury	Khoury	Michel Fadel	3:56
5.	"Fi Shi Nkasar" (Something Broke)	Khoury	Khoury	Chalhoub	3:27
6.	"Ma'ash Walakan" (Nothing Can)	Abdullah	Saad	Tamim	4:17
7.	"Sallimli Aleh" (Say Hello from Me)	Khoury	Khoury	Nasser El Assaad	4:48
8.	"Law Feye" (If Only I Could)	Elias Rahbani	Rahbani	Jad Rahbani	4:09
9.	"Eftakart^{[a]}" (I Remembered)	Mohamad Gomaa	Mohamad Rahim	El Assaad	5:53
10.	"W Byestehi" (My Darling Is Shy)	Siham Chaachaa	Rahim	El Assaad	4:18
11.	"Ma Ta'arafchi Lei" (You Don't Know Why)	Abdullah	Tamer Ali	Chalhoub	4:46
12.	"Aisha Welsalam" (Careless Life)	Abdullah	Saad	Tamim	5:47
13.	"Masdoma^{[b]}" (I'm Shocked)	Abdullah	Saad	Tamim	4:23
Total length:					60:38

Notes

- ^{^[a]} 'Eftakart' is alternatively titled ‘بسمع إسـمك بدمـع’ (English: Hearing Your Name with Tears).
- ^{^[b]} 'Masdoma' is alternatively titled ‘بيقول في حقي’ (English: Words About Me).
- Tracks 1, 3, 6, 9, 11, 12 and 13 are written in Egyptian dialect, while tracks 2, 4, 5, 7, 8 and 10 are written in Lebanese dialect.

== Personnel ==
Adapted from the album liner notes.

- Edouard Meunier – mixer, recording engineer (tracks 7, 9, 10)
- Ellie Barbar – recording engineer (tracks 1, 3, 5, 6), vocal engineer (track 4)
- Tamer El Zowei – recording engineer (track 3)
- Rami El Sharnoobi – recording engineer (tracks 1, 3, 5, 6, 12, 13)
- Mohamed Kebbe - recording engineer (tracks 2, 5, 11)
- Claude Chalhoub - arranger (tracks 2, 5, 11), string arranger (tracks 2, 5, 11), string leader (tracks 1, 2, 6, 11)
- Tamim - arranger (tracks 1, 6, 12, 13), string arranger (tracks 1, 6, 12, 13)
- Jad Rahbani - arranger (track 8), vocal engineer (track 8)
- Michel Fadel - arranger (track 4), piano (track 3)
- Nasser El Assaad - arranger (tracks 7, 9, 10), string arranger (tracks 7, 9, 10), vocal engineer (tracks 7, 9, 10, 12, 13), string leader (tracks 7, 9, 10)
- Walid Sharaky - arranger (track 3), string arranger (track 3)
- Ahmed Ragab - bass guitar (track 3)
- Tarek Salhieh - guitar (track 10)
- Issam Abdelnour - guitar (track 9)
- Mustafa Aslan - guitar (tracks 1, 3, 6, 7, 12, 13)
- Zarzur - kanun (track 7)
- Jihad Assaad - kanun (track 4)
- Maged Soroor - kanun (track 13)
- Reda Bder - ney (track 13)
- Ali Madbouh - ney (track 7)
- Tamer El Zowei - recording engineer (track 3)
- Maurice Tawile - vocal engineer (tracks 1, 2, 3, 5, 6, 11)
- Ahmed Ayadi - tabla (track 13)
- Hisham El Araby - riq (track 13)
- Amer Haddad - lyrical translation
- Tarek Raof - trumpet (track 12)
- Mohamed Atif Imam - violin (tracks 1, 12, 13)
- Mahmood Soroor - violin (tracks 1, 12, 13)
- Tony Haddad – digital mastering
- Gaby Correa – photography
- Matthias Clamer – photography
- Gilberto Yanez - hair & make-up
- Mind the Gap – graphic design

== Awards ==
In recognition of the sales of Tesada'a Bemeen, Elissa won her third World Music Award for Best Selling Artist of the Middle East in the 2010 WMAs and also performed the titular track live in the televised ceremony. She also won the 'Big Apple Music Award' for Best Female Singer in November of that year, the Murex d'Or award for Best Lebanese Singer and additionally scored four 'Celebrity Student Awards' for "Best Album", "Best Lebanese Singer", "Best Song" (for "Aa Bali Habibi") and an honorary award in recognition of winning the World Music Awards for the third time in her career along with being the first artist of Lebanese descent to do so.
