= Hossam Habib =

Egyptian singer and composer (born 1980)

Hossam Habib حسام حبيب
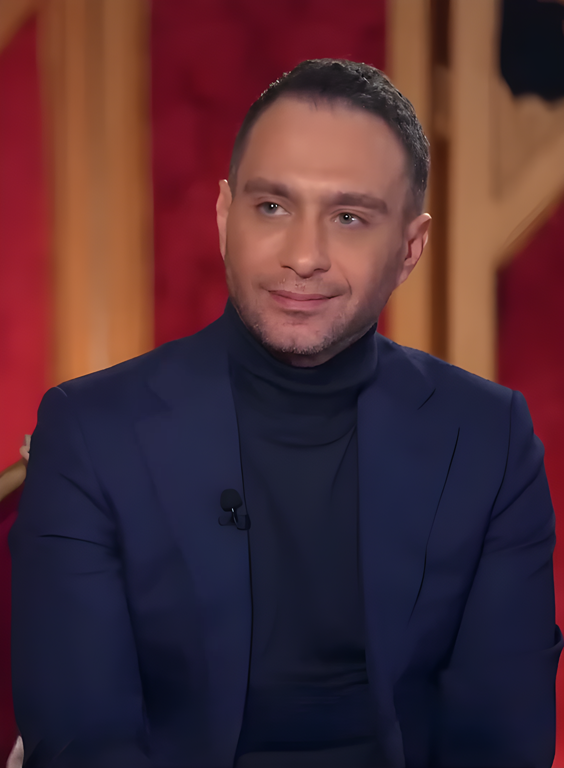

Background information
- Born: Hossam Ed-Deen Hussein Kamil Habib حسام الدين حسين كامل حبيب; May 31, 1980 (age 46); Menoufia, Egypt
- Origin: Menoufia, Egypt
- Genre: Egyptian pop music
- Occupation: Singer
- Years active: 2004–2016, 2024–present
- Labels: Melody Music, Nogoum Records
- Spouses: Sherine (m. 2018; div. 2021) (m. 2022; div. 2023) (m. 2025)

Hossam Habib (Arabic: حسام حبيب; born May 31, 1980) is an Egyptian singer and composer. He initially worked as a composer, writing Elissa's song "Ayshalak", before recording four albums from 2004 to 2016.

== Career ==
Habib initially worked as a composer; he composed Elissa's song "Ayshalak" (Arabic: عايشالك). After Habib's friends and family encouraged him to sing professionally, he recorded his first single "Men Yomak" (Egyptian Arabic: من يومك). He went on to record four albums from 2004 to 2016, winning multiple awards.

After the Arab Spring, Habib released a song called "Aala Sot" (Arabic: أعلى صوت) to commemorate the Tunisian revolution and Egyptian Revolution.

Contrary to the claim that Hossam Habib was on a total hiatus following the release of his 2016 studio album, he actively continued releasing music as a standalone artist. Habib released the single "Ta'araf Bebo" (تعرف بيبو) on Apple Music in November 2017. He followed this up exactly a year later with the launch of another track, "Ya Shabab" (يا شباب), which debuted on digital platforms like Amazon Music in November 2018. He returned in 2024 with the song "Kadaba".

== Personal life ==
Habib has a younger sister, Ranya, and a younger brother, Bassel.

In 2016, Habib recorded a song, "Kol Maghanni", with Sherine Abdel-Wahab for his album Faraa' Keteer. The duet sparked rumors about the two singers being in a romantic relationship. Two years later, Habib married Abdel-Wahab in Cairo on April 7, 2018. This was the second marriage for both Habib and Abdel-Wahab.

Their relationship has faced a lot of turmoil. In 2021, the couple divorced. In May 2022, Habib was arrested for allegedly threatening Abdel-Wahab. A few months later, Abdel-Wahab accused Habib of abuse and of involving her in a scam. In response, Habib accused Abdel-Wahab of "blackmail" and sued her for defamation. Later that year, they remarried, only to divorce again in 2023.

In 2024, Habib spoke about his struggles with religion and depression in a TV interview.

== Discography ==
=== Albums ===
- Lessa ("Still") – 2004
- Agmal Quesset Hob ("The Most Beautiful Love Story") – 2006
- Gowa El Alb ("In the Heart") – 2008
- Faraa' Keteer – 2016

=== Other songs ===
Collaborations with other singers:

- "Law Konna Benhebbaha" (Arabic: لو كنا بنحبها).
- "Ahsan Nass" (Arabic: أحسن ناس).

== Awards ==
Award	Awarded by
Gold Award for the Best Rising Arab Singer in 2008	Murex d'Or 2009
Best Arabic song in 2008	Murex d'Or 2009
Best Album (2008)	Middle East Music Awards 2009
Best Album award (2008)	Dear Guest 5th edition 2009
Talent Award (2014)	Middle East Music Awards
Best single for “Kol Maghanni” (2016)	Dear Guest
Best duet for "Kol Maghanni" (2017)	Arab Music Awards Inaugural Ceremony
