= 2010 World Music Awards =

21st award event

The 2010 (21st annual) World Music Awards took place in Monte Carlo, Monaco and it was hosted by Michelle Rodriguez and Hayden Panettiere on May 18, 2010. This award ceremony returned after a one-year break, in the same spiritual home of Monte Carlo.

== Performers ==
In order of appearance, shown on television.

- Jennifer Lopez – Hits medley ("Louboutins", Get Right", "Jenny from the Block", "Love Don't Cost a Thing", "If You Had My Love", "Waiting for Tonight", "Let's Get Loud")
- Deborah Cox – "Leave the World Behind"
- N.E.R.D. – "Beautiful", "Hot 'n' Fun"
- Namie Amuro – "Hide and Seek"
- David Guetta featuring Kelly Rowland – "When Love Takes Over"
- David Guetta featuring will.i.am – "I Wanna Go Crazy"
- David Guetta featuring Akon – "Sexy Chick"
- Ludacris – "How Low"
- Andrea Bocelli – "Un Amore Cosi Grande"
- Scorpions – "The Best Is Yet To Come" / "Rock You Like a Hurricane" / "Wind of Change (song)" medley
- Elissa – "Tesada'a Bemeen"

Appearance not broadcast on television:

- Tiziano Ferro – "Breathe Gentle"

== Nominees & winners ==
Below is a list of the nominees for each award, in order of presentation, as shown on television. Winners are in bold.

=== Best New Artist ===
Presented by will.i.am

- Justin Bieber
- **Lady Gaga**
- Susan Boyle
- Ke$ha

=== Best Hip-Hop Act ===
Presented by Karolína Kurková

- Eminem
- **Black Eyed Peas**
- Jay-Z
- Ludacris

=== Best Producer ===
Presented by Kelly Rowland

- will.i.am
- Akon
- Pharrell Williams
- **David Guetta**

=== Best African Artist ===
Presented by Tommy Hilfiger

- **Akon**

=== Best Asian Artist ===
Presented by Paris Hilton

- **Namie Amuro**

=== World's Best Pop/Rock Artist ===
Presented by Karolína Kurková

- **Lady Gaga**
- Madonna
- Rihanna
- Taylor Swift

=== Outstanding Contribution to the Arts ===
Presented by Cuba Gooding Jr.

- **Jennifer Lopez**

=== Best DJ ===
Presented by Victoria Silvstedt

- **Tiësto**
- David Guetta
- Armin van Buuren
- deadmau5

=== Best French Artist ===
- **David Guetta**

=== Best R&B Artist ===
Presented by Paris and Nicky Hilton

- Alicia Keys
- Akon
- **Black Eyed Peas**
- Beyoncé

=== Best Single ===
Presented by Melody Thornton

- "Sexy Chick" by David Guetta feat. Akon
- "When Love Takes Over" by David Guetta feat. Kelly Rowland
- "Single Ladies (Put a Ring on It)" by Beyoncé
- "Use Somebody" by Kings of Leon
- "I Gotta Feeling" by Black Eyed Peas
- **"Poker Face"** by **Lady Gaga**

=== Best Classical Artist ===
Presented by Robin Gibb

- Paul Potts
- The Priests
- **Andrea Bocelli**
- Katherine Jenkins

=== World's Best Album ===
Presented by Rachel Hunter and Peter Andre

- Number Ones by Michael Jackson
- I Dreamed a Dream by Susan Boyle
- **The Fame** by **Lady Gaga**
- The E.N.D. by Black Eyed Peas
- Fearless by Taylor Swift

=== Rock Legends ===
Presented by Wladimir Klitschko

- **Scorpions**

=== Award presentations not broadcast on television ===
==== World's Best Rock Artist ====
- **U2**

==== More regional awards ====
- World's Best-Selling American Artist: **Lady Gaga**
- World's Best-Selling Australian Artist: **Empire of the Sun**
- World's Best-Selling British Artist: **Susan Boyle**
- World's Best-Selling Canadian Artist: **Céline Dion**
- World's Best-Selling German Artist: **Rammstein**
- World's Best-Selling Irish Artist: **U2**
- World's Best-Selling Italian Artist: **Tiziano Ferro**
- World's Best-Selling Latin American Artist: **Shakira**
- World's Best-Selling Middle Eastern Artist: **Elissa**
- World's Best-Selling Scandinavian Artist: **A-Ha**
- World's Best-Selling Spanish Artist: **Mónica Naranjo**

== International telecasts ==
- Canada: Citytv
- France: NRJ 12
- Italy: Rai Due
- Latin America: MGM Channel
- Philippines: GMA 7
- Portugal: MGM Channel
- Romania: Acasa TV
- Switzerland: SRF zwei
- United Kingdom: Channel 4
- United States: MyNetworkTV
