= Baddy Doub =

Baddy Doub بدي دوب

Studio album by Elissa
- Released: December 1998 (Lebanon) (single only); 1 February 1999 (Arab world)
- Recorded: 1998
- Genres: Arabic; Arabic pop
- Length: 42:47
- Labels: Lido; EMI

Elissa chronology
Baddy Doub بدي دوب (1998)	W'akherta Maak (2000)

Singles from Baddy Doub
- 1. "Baddy Doub" Released: December 1998

Baddy Doub (Arabic: بدي دوب) (English: I Want to Melt Away) is the first studio album by Lebanese singer Elissa. The album was produced by Lido Musique and distributed by Watary music company in early December 1998 in Lebanon, before being picked up by EMI for distribution in the Arab world and elsewhere in February 1999. Elissa filmed a music video for the titular song "Baddy Doub", which achieved huge success in the Arab world. The album was among the best-selling albums in the Arab world throughout 1999 and remained on the charts in the following year. After the album's success, the American company Head & Shoulders signed with Elissa for her first commercial deal, and she advertised the shampoo with her song "Baddy Doub".

After participating in the talent show "Studio El Fan," Elissa signed a contract that was never executed. She met producer Jean Saliba, who was about to start his own music production company. Saliba believed in Elissa's talent and offered her the chance to make a full album. Work on the album began in 1998 with arranger Jean-Marie Riachi, who arranged the song "Baddy Doub" first. Jean Saliba produced for the first time, Jean-Marie arranged for the first time, and Elissa sang in the studio for the first time. The album was recorded entirely in the studio and no live musical instruments were used. All the songs were arranged with keyboards. Six of the songs were Turkish hits at the time of their release in Turkey, along with two new songs by Egyptian composer Salah El Sharnoubi and arranger Nasser Al Asaad.

Everyone wanted to introduce a new musical style and a Western atmosphere. The question was whether the album would succeed or fail. The song "Baddy Doub" was originally "Be Adam" by Turkish artist Gülşen. The album stood out due to the Spanish flair brought by Spanish singer Gerard Ferrer. The song "Baddy Doub" was released in the last days of 1998, and the full album came out in February 1999. To the surprise of Elissa and the producers, the album became a huge hit, with multiple editions of the CD and cassette were released. Versions were released in Canada, Turkey, Lebanon, Greece and France, along with promotional vinyls and CDs. Various illegal copies were also sold in Israel and Iran. The album remained the most popular album in Lebanon and the Arab world in 1999 and brought enormous success to Elissa with different promotion events and concerts.

== Track listing ==
All tracks feature vocals by Gerard Ferrer.

No.	Title	Lyrics	Music	Arranger	Length
1.	"Baddy Doub" (I Want to Melt Away)	Elias Nasser	Gülşen	Jean-Marie Riachi	3:57
2.	"Dalolak" (Without You)	Mohammed Hassan	Salah El Charnoubi	Nasser El Assaad	4:55
3.	"Hilm Al Ahlam" (The Dream of Dreams)	Adel Raffoul	Nasser El Assaad	Nasser El Assaad	4:21
4.	"Waynak Habibi" (Where Are You Darling?)	Adel Raffoul	Özkan Turgay	Jean-Marie Riachi	4:40
5.	"Elissa"	Adel Raffoul	Bendeniz	Jean-Marie Riachi	4:45
6.	"Chou Ma Sar" (Whatever Happens)	Elias Nasser	Serdar Ortaç	Nasser El Assaad	3:35
7.	"Zaalan" (Angry)	Elias Nasser	Ufuk Yıldırım	Nasser El Assaad	3:20
8.	"Ghali" (My Precious)	Elias Nasser	Serdar Ortaç	Jean-Marie Riachi	4:00
9.	"Dalolak (Oriental Mix)"				4:55
10.	"Hilm Al Ahlam (French Mix)"				4:19
Total length:					42:47

Notes

- "Baddy Doub" is an Arabic-language cover of the 1996 Turkish song "Be Adam" by Gülşen. Also composed by Özkan Turgay
- "Waynak Habibi" is an Arabic-language cover of the 1996 Turkish song "Saz mı Caz mı?" by Gülşen.
- "Elissa" is an Arabic-language cover of the 1995 Turkish song "Sevme" by Bendeniz.
- "Chou Ma Sar" is an Arabic-language cover of the 1995 song "Dalgalar" by Fulden Uras
- "Zaalan" is an Arabic-language cover of the 1997 Turkish song "Acilen" by İzel.
- "Ghali" is an Arabic-language cover of the 1996 Turkish song "Dert Gecesi" by Serdar Ortaç.
