= Ana Sekketen =

Ana Sekketen أنا سكتين

Studio album by Elissa
- Released: 7 May 2024
- Recorded: 2022–2024
- Genres: Arabic; Arabic pop
- Length: 47:33
- Labels: E-Records; Rotana (distributor)
- Producers: Ahmad Ibrahim; Amin Nabil; Danny Khoury; Jalal El Hamdaoui; Omar Sabbagh; Mohamed Rahim

Elissa chronology
| Sahbit Raey (2020) | Ana Sekketen أنا سكتين (2024) | Elissar (2026) |

Singles from Ana Sekketen
- 1. "Batmayel Aala El Beat" Released: 30 June 2023; 2. "El Okd" Released: 20 August 2023; 3. "Kello Waham" Released: 29 January 2024

Ana Sekketen (Arabic: أنا سكتين) (English: I Am Two Ways) is the thirteenth studio album by Lebanese singer Elissa. It was released by E-Records on 7 May 2024. The album features 12 tracks and is preceded by the singles "Batmayel Aala El Beat", "El Okd" and "Kello Waham". Ana Sekketen is the first album to be released by Elissa's own label "E-Records", marking her first album since the departure from Saudi-based label Rotana since signing in 2003. The album is, however distributed by the former label.

The album was delayed numerous times due to various reasons, including significant controversy involving Elissa and record label Watary due to a dispute regarding Elissa's official YouTube channel and was a surprise release.

The album was initially only made available through all digital music platforms except YouTube after Watary repeatedly removed "El Okd" upon its release as the album's second single due to copyrights claims.

== Tour ==
Spanning five continents, the tour commenced in Al-Ula, Saudi Arabia, on 9 January 2026, and is currently scheduled to conclude on 23 May 2027, following a two-night residency at L’Olympia in Paris, France.

Tour dates

List of 2026 dates
| Date (2026) | City | Country | Venue | Opening Act | Attendance | Revenue |
|---|---|---|---|---|---|---|
| January 9 | Al-Ula | Saudi Arabia | Maraya Concert Hall | — | — | — |
| February 1 | Abu Dhabi | United Arab Emirates | Space42 Arena | — | — | — |
| February 6 | Toronto | Canada | Mississauga Sports and Entertainment Centre | — | — | — |
| February 7 | New York City | United States | Brooklyn Oceana Theatre | — | — | — |
| February 12 | Miami | United States | Arcadia Theatre | — | — | — |
| February 13 | San Diego | United States | Viejas Casino & Resort | — | — | — |
| February 14 | Detroit | United States | Bellagio Banquet Hall | — | — | — |
| February 15 | Nassau | Bahamas | Royal Caribbean Theatre | — | — | — |
| February 16 | Miami | United States | Arcadia Theatre | — | — | — |
| June 5 | Cairo | Egypt | American University of Cairo | — | — | — |
| June 20 | Rabat | Morocco | Royal Theatre of Rabat | — | — | — |
| June 25 | Cairo | Egypt | Andalusite Royal Ballroom | — | — | — |
| July 28 | Beirut | Lebanon | Beirut Waterfront | — | — | — |
| July 30 | Jerash | Jordan | Jerash Roman Theatre | — | — | — |
| July 31 | Jeddah | Saudi Arabia | Abadi Al Johar Arena | — | — | — |
| August 15 | Carthage | Tunisia | Carthage Amphitheatre | — | — | — |
| August 21 | New Alamein | Egypt | U Arena | — | — | — |
| October 2 | Kuwait City | Kuwait | Kuwait Opera House | — | — | — |
| October 9 | Melbourne | Australia | Margaret Court Arena | — | — | — |
| October 10 | Sydney | Australia | International Convention Centre Sydney | — | — | — |
| October 22 | New Cairo | Egypt | Al Manara International Conference Center | — | — | — |
| November 13 | Muscat | Oman | Madinat Al Irfan Theatre | — | — | — |
| November 16 | Cairo | Egypt | Waldorf Astoria Cairo Heliopolis | — | — | — |
| November 21 | Limassol | Cyprus | Grand Ballroom | — | — | — |
| November 28 | Hannover | Germany | Hannover Congress Centrum | — | — | — |
| December 19 | Abu Dhabi | United Arab Emirates | Space42 Arena | — | — | — |
| December 31 | Alexandria | Egypt | Rixos Montaza | — | — | — |
| Total | | | | | — | — |

List of 2027 dates
| Date (2027) | City | Country | Venue | Opening Act | Attendance | Revenue |
|---|---|---|---|---|---|---|
| January 24 | San Bernardino | United States | Yaamava’ Theater | — | — | — |
| January 29 | Cancún | Mexico | Hard Rock Hotel Riviera Maya | — | — | — |
| January 30 | Cancún | Mexico | Hard Rock Hotel Riviera Maya | — | — | — |
| January 31 | Cancún | Mexico | Hard Rock Hotel Riviera Maya | — | — | — |
| May 22 | Paris | France | L’Olympia | — | — | — |
| May 23 | Paris | France | L’Olympia | — | — | — |
| Total | | | | | — | — |

== Track listing ==
| No. | Title | Lyrics | Music | Producer | Length |
|---|---|---|---|---|---|
| 1. | "Batmayel Aala El Beat" (Moving to the Beat) | Aziz Chafei | Aziz Chafei | Amin Nabil | 4:07 |
| 2. | "Ana Sekketen" (I Am Two Ways) | Nader Abdullah | Tamer Ashour | Ahmad Ibrahim | 4:57 |
| 3. | "Farhana Maak" (Joyful with You) | Abdullah | Ghokan Ors | Ibrahim | 4:40 |
| 4. | "Kello Waham" (Illusion) | Marwan Khoury | Marwan Khoury | Danny Khoury | 3:22 |
| 5. | "El Okd" (The Necklace) | Ayman Bahgat Kamar | Mohammed Yehia | Jalal El Hamdaoui | 3:38 |
| 6. | "El Nazra El Oula" (First Sight) | Kamar | Yehia | El Hamdaoui | 3:46 |
| 7. | "Chou Kan Biemnaak" (What Was Stopping You?) | Marwan Khoury | Marwan Khoury | Omar Sabbagh | 4:07 |
| 8. | "Men Awel El Satr" (From the First Line) | Osama Mustafa | Samer Abu Taleb | El Hamdaoui | 3:46 |
| 9. | "Nazarat" (Glances) | Saber Kamal | Yehia | El Hamdaoui | 3:18 |
| 10. | "Hazzi Dehekli" (I Laugh At My Luck) | Marwan Khoury | Marwan Khoury | Danny Khoury | 3:12 |
| 11. | "Halali" (My Solution) | Abdullah | Ahmed Zaeem | Ibrahim | 4:06 |
| 12. | "Julio W Fairuz" (Julio and Fairuz) | Mohamed Rahim | Rahim | Rahim | 4:28 |
| Total length: | | | | | 47:33 |
