= Ayshalak =

Ayshalak عايشالك

Studio album by Elissa
- Released: 14 June 2002
- Recorded: 2001–2002
- Studio: Jean-Marie Riachi
- Genre: Arabic; Arabic pop
- Length: 47:06
- Label: Music Master

Elissa chronology
W'akherta Maak (2000)	Ayshalak عايشالك (2002)	Ahla Dounya (2004)

Singles from Ayshalak
- 1. "Ayshalak"; 2. "Ajmal Ihssas"

Alternative cover

Ayshalak (Arabic: عايشالك) (English: I Live for You) is the third studio album by Lebanese singer Elissa released by Music Master on 14 June 2002. The album was well received by the public and critics, and achieved great commercial success with sales of 2.95 million copies in 2002. It ranked first in terms of sales in the Arab world upon its release, and remained number one on the charts for six months until mid-December 2002, when it was displaced by Ragheb Alama's album Tab Leh and dropped to second place. Many of the album's songs were translated into songs in other languages, including the titular song "Ayshalak" that was covered in Serbian, Turkish, and Russian. The song "Ajmal Ihssas" has been covered four times by different Turkish artists, including Ferhat Göçer, Firdevs, Zeynep Casalini, and Sinan Akçıl.

The music video for "Ayshalak" was filmed in Paris under the direction of director Fabrice Bigotti, which made Elissa the first Arab artist to officially appear in a dress specially designed for her by the fashion house Dior. In September 2002, Elissa received the award for Best Female Singer from the Murex d'Or, and her music video "Ajmal Ihssas" won the Best Music Video Award at the Dubai Music Festival.

This album used live instruments for the first time while her first two albums made full use of keyboards

== Track listing ==
All tracks arranged by Jean-Marie Riachi, except for "Shiltak Min Albi" and "La Trouh", which were arranged by Nasser El Assaad.

No.	Title	Lyrics	Music	Length
1.	"Ayshalak" (I Live for You)	Mohammad Al Rifai	Hossam Habib; Jean-Marie Riachi	4:40
2.	"Ah Min Hawak" (Suffering from Your Love)	Toni Abi Karam	Jean-Marie Riachi	4:44
3.	"Ajmal Ihssas" (Best Feeling)	Mohammad Al Rifai	Mohamed Rahim; Mohammad Al Rifai	5:56
4.	"Shaghilni" (Working Me Up)	Mohammad Al Rifai	Mohammad Al Rifai	4:13
5.	"Shiltak Min Albi" (You're Out of My Heart)	Nabil Abou Abdo	Gerard Ferrer	4:15
6.	"Million Ahibbak" (I Love A Million Times)	Mohammad Al Rifai	Khaled Ezz	6:00
7.	"Baada" (Still)	Nabil Abou Abdo	Jean-Marie Riachi	4:16
8.	"Kilmit Hob" (Word of Love)	Nizar Francis	Nasser El Assaad	3:57
9.	"La Trouh" (Don't Go)	Toni Abi Karam	Nasser El Assaad	4:07
10.	"Shou El Hal" (What's the Solution)	Nabil Abou Abdo	Tarkan	4:15
Total length:				47:06

Notes

- "Shou El Hal" is an Arabic-language cover of the 2001 Turkish song "Kuzu Kuzu" by Tarkan.

== Personnel ==
Adapted from the album liner notes.

- Edouard Meunier - sound engineer, mixing
- Xavier Escabasse - sound engineer
- Philippe Hervet - guitar
- Chris De Pauw - guitar
- Jihad Aki - violin
- Gerard Ferrer - vocals, Spanish lyrics (tracks 5, 8)
- Alexandre Ubeda - photographer
- Amin Abiyaghi - management
