= Helwa ya baladi =

- Single cover

Single by Dalida

from the album Dédié à toi
- Language: Egyptian Arabic
- Released: 1979
- Recorded: 1979
- Studio: CBE
- Genre: Patriotic; sentimental ballad
- Length: 3:33
- Label: International Shows
- Composers: Gilbert Sinoué; Bernard Liamis; Jeff Barnel
- Lyricist: Marwan Saada
- Producer: Orlando

"Helwa ya baladi" (Egyptian Arabic: حلوة يا بلدي, IPA: [ˈħelwæ jæ ˈbælædi]; "Oh Sweet, My Homeland") is an Egyptian Arabic song by Dalida released as a single in 1979, enjoying great popularity in the Middle East and the Arab diaspora. The song is an homage to Egypt, Dalida's birthplace, and is considered representative of the nationalistic pride felt by many Egyptians.

== Composition ==
The song is composed in the key of C minor. A sequence of chords, based on a cycle of fifths (F minor – B♭ – E♭), leads each strophe of the song away from the minor and into the relative major, E♭ major. Then, an applied dominant chord (D major) interrupts the sequence leading to the dominant chord of G7 which brings each strophe home to the original tonality of C minor.

== History ==
"Helwa ya baladi" was the second song in Arabic language for Dalida after her hit "Salma Ya Salama". She sang it during French television broadcasts.

It was sung by tens to hundreds of thousands of Egyptians who demonstrated in Tahrir Square during the Egyptian Revolution of 2011.

== Versions ==
The song was also recorded in French as "Comment l'oublier" in 1981, in Spanish (despite the Italian title) as "Io t'amerò" in 1984 and remixed in Spanish for the album Le rêve oriental in 1998.

The song has been covered many times notably by French-Israeli singer Ishtar in 2005 in the album Je sais d'où je viens in Arabic and Spanish. It was also recorded by the Lebanese singer Elissa in 2014 in her album Halet Hob.
