= Aida Chalhoub =

Lebanese singer (born 1951)

Aida Chalhoub Ziade (Arabic: عايده شلهوب زيادة; born 1951) is a Lebanese singer. She is the Dean of Oriental Singing at the "Lebanese National Higher Conservatory of Music" (LNHCM), since 1997. She is also the head of the oriental division at a music school of Lebanon which is the Faculty of Music at the Holy Spirit University of Kaslik where she also teaches Oriental singing.

The Lebanese singer Elissa reproduced a song entitled "Law Fiyeh", originally by Aida Chalhoub, and it became a success. However, some dispute did arise due to renewing this song, since the management office behind Elissa announced that the renewal of the song is in the memory of singer Salwa Al Katrib, in a reference to her as the original singer. Not only Elissa did not apologize for the mistake, but Elissa did refer to Aida in a television interview as "[the] late singer Aida Chalhoub", for which Aida also claims she did not receive any apology.
