= W'akherta Maak =

W'akherta Maak وآخرتا معك

Studio album by Elissa
- Released: 8 August 2000
- Recorded: 1999–2000
- Studio: Joe Baroudjian (Beirut); Plus XXX (Paris)
- Genre: Arabic; Arabic pop
- Length: 48:28 (standard edition)
- Label: Dilara Productions; Music Master
- Producer: Jean-Marie Riachi; Nasser El Assaad

Elissa chronology
Baddy Doub (1998)	W'akherta Maak وآخرتا معك (2000)	Ayshalak (2002)

Singles from W'akherta Maak
- 1. "W'akherta Maak"; 2. "Betghib Betrouh"

2001 edition

W'akherta Maak (Arabic: وآخرتا معك) (English: What Else With You?) is the second studio album by Lebanese singer Elissa released by Dilara Productions & Music Master on 8 August 2000. The album achieved wide success in the Arab world and ranked first in terms of sales upon its release. For three months, it occupied the first three spots in the best-selling albums chart along with the album Fi Eshg El Banat by singer Mohamed Mounir, which was released at the same time. As a result of the heavy demand and the limited availability of the first edition, eight additional editions were issued, with an average of 120,000 copies sold per edition. The album remained among the best-selling albums in the following year, in competition with the albums released at the end of 2000, such as Inta al Aziz and Jarhi Ana, and albums released at the beginning of the year 2001, such as Habib el Alb and Laila Habibi. However, its main rival was the album Tamally Maak, with which it competed in the best-selling albums chart for a whole year.

The album features eleven songs, all written by Elias Nasser, and included a duet with Ragheb Alama titled "Betghib Betrouh". The song's music video, which was directed by Marc Hadifé, won many awards, and as a result of its success, special editions were released under its name, which ranked first in the lists of the best-selling albums in Egypt. The duet also became among the most streamed songs for an entire year on Arab websites at the time. In 2001, Ragheb Alama included the song in his album Saharooni el Leil to take advantage of the wide success. Additionally, an accompanying music video for the album's titular song, also directed by Hadifé, was released. However, Elissa revealed in an interview in 2002 that she regretted making the video due to her "repeating herself" by being dressed in merely a bed sheet; which she received considerable controversy for doing so in the music video of her debut single "Baddy Doub".

== Track listing ==
All lyrics written by Elias Nasser.

Standard edition
No.	Title	Music	Arranger	Length
1.	"Daa El E'nwann" (Lost Address)	Phoebus	Nasser El Assaad	4:37
2.	"Betghib Betrouh (duet with Ragheb Alama)" (You Disappear, You Go)	Ege	Jean-Marie Riachi	4:20
3.	"W'akherta Maak" (What Else With You?)	Georges Karam	Jean-Marie Riachi	5:35
4.	"Haram" (Shame on You)	Jean-Marie Riachi	Jean-Marie Riachi	4:08
5.	"Minn Albi Tmanayt" (I Sang from My Heart)	Jean-Marie Riachi	Jean-Marie Riachi	2:57
6.	"Wahyatt El Hob" (For Love's Sake)	Feyyaz Kuruş	Jean-Marie Riachi	4:29
7.	"Ramchet A'yn" (Blink of an Eye)	Altan Çetin	Jean-Marie Riachi	4:39
8.	"Sa'alna" (We Asked...)	Serdar Ortaç	Nasser El Assaad	4:46
9.	"Saharni Habibi" (Keep Me Up My Darling)	Serdar Ortaç	Nasser El Assaad	4:33
10.	"Chafouna Tneyn" (They Saw Us Two)	Alex Fox	Nasser El Assaad	4:22
11.	"Minn Bloum" (Who Can I Blame?)	Ahmet Özden · Nadide Sultan	Jean-Marie Riachi	3:57
Total length:				48:28

Notes

- "Betghib Betrouh" is an Arabic-language cover of the 1995 Turkish song "Delice Bir Sevda" by Ege.
- "Wahyatt El Hob" is an Arabic-language cover of the 2000 Turkish song "Ya Hey" by Emrah. The song was included as an additional track in the form of a duet in Arabic with Emrah in the 2001 edition of W'akherta Maak.
- "Sa'alna" is an Arabic-language cover of the 1998 Greek song "Eglima Kardias" by Antypas.
- "Saharni Habibi" is an Arabic-language cover of the 1999 Turkish song "Asrın Hatası" by Serdar Ortaç.

== Credits ==
Adapted from the album liner notes.

- Edouard Meunier - mixing
- Georges Youssef - design
- Nadine Ashkar - photographer
