= Ila Kol Elli Bihebbouni =

Ila Kol Elli Bihebbouni إلى كل اللي بيحبوني

Studio album by Elissa
- Released: 25 July 2018
- Recorded: 2017–2018
- Studios: ART (Cairo · Istanbul); Sawt El Hob; Romantic; CK Music Production; Michel Fadel; Nasser El Assaad; Al Risala (Cairo); Oxygen Sound (Cairo); Urbanistic Bekito; Dany Helou
- Genres: Arabic; Arabic pop
- Length: 72:55
- Label: Rotana Music Group

Elissa chronology
Saharna Ya Leil (2016)	Ila Kol Elli Bihebbouni إلى كل اللي بيحبوني (2018)	Sahbit Raey (2020)

Singles from Ila Kol Elli Bihebbouni
- 1. "Ila Kol Elli Bihebbouni" Released: 7 August 2018; 2. "Krahni" Released: 22 April 2019

Alternative cover
- Digital cover

Ila Kol Elli Bihebbouni (Arabic: إلى كل اللي بيحبوني) (English: To All Those Who Love Me) is the eleventh studio album by Lebanese singer Elissa released by Rotana on 25 July 2018. The album features 16 tracks. On the first week of its release, the album debuted at #10 on the Billboard World Albums chart.

On 7 August 2018, Elissa released the music video for "Ila Kol Elli Bihebbouni" where in the music video, Elissa disclosed her breast cancer diagnosis in late December 2017 along with her treatment and recovery. The music video went viral and amassed more than 9 million views during its first week of release.

== Track listing ==
No.	Title	Lyrics	Music	Arranger	Length
1.	"Ila Kol Elli Bihebbouni" (To All Those Who Love Me)	Shady Nour	Mohammed Yehia	Amadio	5:19
2.	"Krahni" (Hate Me)	Ali Mawla	Fadel Sleiman	Camil Khoury	4:50
3.	"Mafish Asbab" (No Reason)	Amir Teima	Ramy Gamal	Ahmad Abdel Salam	4:06
4.	"Nefsi A'ollo" (I Feel Like Telling Him)	Nader Abdallah	İbrahim Tatlıses	Nasser El Assaad	5:32
5.	"Ana Wahida" (Lonely)	Amir Teima	Walid Saad	Ahmad Ibrahim	4:02
6.	"Lessa Fiha Kalam" (There's A Lot More for Us)	Nader Abdallah	Ramy Gamal	Tamim	4:50
7.	"Hikayat" (Stories)	Ossama Mostafa	Mohammed Yehia	Khaled Nabil	5:13
8.	"Bein Albi W Albak" (Between My Heart and Yours)	Ahmed El Gandy	Madyan	Ahmad Abdel Salam	3:52
9.	"Maridit Ehtimam" (Attention Seeker)	Ali Mawla	Rami El Chafei	Camil Khoury	4:39
10.	"Ertah W Eish" (Relax and Live)	Hani Abdel Karim	Walid Saad	Khaled Nabil	4:49
11.	"Enta W Maii" (When You're with Me)	Omar Sary	Mohammed Bashar	Camil Khoury	4:36
12.	"Bena Neechaa" (Let's Just Be in Love)	Tamer Hussein	Mostafa Mahfouz	Karim Abdel Wahab	4:03
13.	"Kitira Aleh" (Too Good for Him)	Ahmad El Gendy	Madyan	Omar Ismael	4:04
14.	"Men Inaya Di" (I'm All Yours)	Nader Abdallah	Jean Saliba	Behim Avmedovski (Bekito)	3:55
15.	"Al Mikhfi" (Our Secret)	Salim Assaf	Salim Assaf	Dany Helou	3:30
16.	"Wahashtouni" (How I Miss You)	Said Morsi	Baligh Hamdi	Nasser El Assaad	5:35
Total length:					72:55

Notes

- "Nefsi A'ollo" is an Arabic-language cover of the 1994 Turkish song "Haydi Söyle" by İbrahim Tatlıses.
- "Wahashtouni" is a cover of the 1974 song by Warda.

== Personnel ==
Adapted from the album liner notes.

- Jean Nakhoul - executive producer
- Nasser El Assadd - recording, keyboard (track 16)
- Elie Barbar - recording (track 2), vocal sound engineer
- Edouard Meunier - mixing
- Tim Young - mastering
- Tamer Ghneim - strings (tracks 1, 10), strings leader (track 5, 7)
- Tarek Raouf - trumpet (track 1)
- Rocket - guitar and mandolin (track 1)
- Wael El Naggar - accordion (tracks 1, 8)
- Ahmad El Iyadi - tablah (track 1)
- Sherif Alyan - contrabass (track 1)
- Acapella - chorus (track 1)
- Mohammed Adas - strings recording (track 1), music engineer (tracks 5, 7, 10)
- Mahmoud Ezzat - music engineer (track 1)
- Alain Oueijane - guitar (tracks 2, 9, 11), electric guitar (track 15)
- Ihab Jamal - violin (tracks 2, 9)
- Hassan Saeed - strings section (track 3)
- Mostafa Aslan - guitar (tracks 3, 6, 7, 16), electric guitar (tracks 4, 7), acoustic guitar (track 10)
- Ammar Khater - sound engineer (tracks 3, 8)
- Bulant - clarinet (track 4)
- Ayhan Gunyel - acoustic guitar (track 4)
- Ali Chaker - bağlama (track 4)
- Morat - bass guitar (track 4)
- Ibrahim - duduk (track 4)
- Majd Jaride - violins group (track 4)
- Franco Lof - bass guitar (track 5)
- Mostafa Nasr - guitar (tracks 5, 8, 13)
- Fares Sakr - violin (track 5), strings (track 13)
- Hamoso - clarinet (tracks 6, 13), saxophone (tracks 6, 16)
- Ahmad Khairy - ney (track 6)
- Mohammed Atef Imam - violin (track 6), strings section leader (track 6)
- Osama Hassan - bouzouki (track 6)
- Ahmad Gouda - sound engineer (track 6)
- Ahmed Ragab - bass guitar (tracks 7, 10)
- Osama Ezz - piano (track 7)
- Diaa Badr - percussion (tracks 7, 10)
- Nadim Rouhana - accordion (track 9)
- Amr Saleh - piano (track 10)
- Hussein Kemanci - violin (track 10)
- Can Kesmez - music engineer (track 10)
- Ehab Sobhy - strings group (track 12)
- Mostafa Raouf - music engineer (tracks 13, 16)
- Mohammed Mostafa - ney (track 16)
- Mahmoud Ez El Dine - percussions (track 16)
- Matthias Clamer - photographer
- Georges Haddad - photoshoot production
- Rasha Kassab - photoshoot concept
- Yehya Chokr - hair
- Bassam Fattouh - make up
- Mandy Merheb - fashion consultant
- Rula Zuheir Baalbaki - translator

== Charts ==
Chart (2018)	Peak position
Billboard World Albums	10
