= Ahla Dounya =

Ahla Dounya أحلى دنيا

Studio album by Elissa
- Released: 6 May 2004
- Recorded: April 2003 – January 2004
- Studios: Jean-Marie Riachi; Damiens (France); Galaxy (London)
- Genres: Arabic; Arabic pop
- Length: 59:42
- Label: Rotana Music Group
- Producer: Jean-Marie Riachi

Elissa chronology
Ayshalak (2002)	Ahla Dounya أحلى دنيا (2004)	Bastanak (2006)

Singles from Ahla Dounya
- 1. "Koul Youm Fee Oumri" Released: 14 May 2004; 2. "Irjaa Lilshowk" Released: 30 November 2004; 3. "Hobak Wajaa (Inta Lameen)" Released: 14 June 2005

Ahla Dounya (Arabic: أحلى دنيا) (English: The Most Beautiful World) is the fourth studio album by Lebanese singer Elissa, released by Rotana on 6 May 2004. The album includes 13 tracks; all of which were produced by Jean-Marie Riachi. The songs "Koul Youm Fee Oumri", "Irjaa Lilshowk" and "Hobak Wajaa (Inta Lameen") were released as singles and received music videos. Ahla Dounya was Elissa's first album to be released by Rotana and was a wide commercial success in the Arab world; achieving sales of more than 3.4 million copies in 2004 and topping the charts in Arab countries for several months. The album was praised by critics for its wide range of musical genres, production and the romantic songwriting; the latter of which aided Elissa gain her nickname as the "Queen of Emotions."

As a result of its success, the album won many accolades. Elissa won the 2005 World Music Award for Best Selling Middle Eastern Artist at a ceremony in Los Angeles, becoming the first Lebanese artist to receive the award. Additionally, Elissa received two Murex d'Or awards for Best Female Singer and Best Music Video for "Hobak Wajaa (Inta Lameen)". Additionally, it is known to be the first Arabic album to be produced and released in Super Audio sound technology.

== Background ==
In 2002, Elissa's third studio album Ayshalak was released by Dilara and Music Master to substantial commercial success and was considered by many to be her breakthrough. The album topped Arab music charts for numerous months and its titular song, as well as "Ajmal Ihsaas" were released as singles. That same year, Elissa performed at the STARS charity dinner held in Dubai; with Queen Rania of Jordan and former United States President Bill Clinton in attendance. She additionally collaborated with Irish singer Chris de Burgh in a duet titled "Lebanese Night." A music video directed by Salim el Turk was shot in Lebanon and Sweden and premiered on television in December.

Shortly after the release of Ayshalak, Elissa entered negotiations with Saudi Arabian entertainment group Rotana, later signing a 3-album contract with the label in 2003 during the recording of the album.

== Writing and recording ==
In April 2003, it was reported that Elissa began work on her fourth studio album, collaborating with Kuwaiti singer and songwriter Mohammed Al-Balushi. However, no songs written by Al-Balushi were included in the final cut of the album. Writing sessions began in late May as Elissa travelled to Cairo to meet with composers in order to choose songs for the album. Sessions continued throughout 2003 with Elissa recording the songs "Ahla Dounya", "Koul Youm Fee Oumri" and "Irjaa Lilshowk". In September 2003, Elissa signed a partnership with Pepsi. During the same month, she shot an advertisement for the soft drink featuring a brand new song titled "Karibli". (Note: Pronounced as "Ah-rab-li".) Later, it was reported that Elissa decided to include the song on the album.

In an interview, Elissa revealed that she had a dispute with songwriter Mohammad Al Rifai, stating that Al Rifai presented one song to another artist and another to an Egyptian artist that featured the same introduction as one of the songs featured on Ahla Dounya. Despite the controversy, the songs were still featured on the album. Al Rifai wrote the song "Ahla Dounya" as well as "Kan Nafsee Aaraf", "Gouwaya Leik" and the lyrics for "Koul Youm Fee Oumri". A song titled "Layaly El Shouq" by Egyptian singer Shaza featured the same introductory melodies as "Koul Youm Fee Oumri". Upon being asked about the similarities at a press conference, Elissa stated that it was the fault of the composer.

== Track listing ==
All tracks produced by Jean-Marie Riachi.

No.	Title	Lyrics	Music	Length
1.	"Irjaa Lilshowk" (Return to Love)	Saffouh Shaghaleh	Nuhad Najjar	5:15
2.	"Ahla Dounya" (The Most Beautiful World)	Mohammad Al Rifai	Mohammad Al Rifai	4:17
3.	"Koul Youm Fee Oumri" (Every Day of My Life)	Mohammad Al Rifai	Walid Sharaky	5:22
4.	"Khalini Aiish" (Let Me Live)	Sameh al-Agami	Sherif Tag	4:47
5.	"Bein Il Ein" (Between My Eyes)	Nabil Abou Abdou	Metin Özülkü	4:15
6.	"Hobak Wajaa (Inta Lameen)" (Your Love Is Pain [Who Do You Belong To?])	Nizar Francis	Samir Sfeir	4:47
7.	"Kad Ma Bishtaklak" (I Miss You So)	Mohammad Al Rifai	Hossam Habib	3:48
8.	"Kan Nafsee Aaraf" (I Wish I Knew)	Mohammad Al Rifai	Mohammad Al Rifai	5:02
9.	"Zekra" (Memory)	Jiscar Lahoud	Elie Nakhle Habib	5:03
10.	"Irham Albi" (Have Mercy on My Heart)	Mohammad Al Rifai	Rashida al-Hares	4:06
11.	"Gouwaya Leik" (Inside Me)	Mohammad Al Rifai	Mohammad Al Rifai	4:34
12.	"Karibli" (Come Close to Me)	Nabil Abou Abdou	Jean-Marie Riachi	3:48
13.	"Law Nirjaa Sawa" (If We're Together Again)	Mounir Bou Assaf	Nuhad Najjar	4:37
Total length:				59:42

Notes

- "Bein Il Ein" is an Arabic-language cover of the 2003 Turkish song "Dile Benden" by İzel.
- On pressings issued by Founoon, a 2-minute 20 second instrumental of "Law Nirjaa Sawa" is included as track 7. Additionally, alternate versions of "Irjaa Lilshowk", "Irham Albi" and "Karibli" are included, as well as on early pressings by EMI Music Arabia.

== Credits and personnel ==
=== Personnel ===
Adapted from the album liner notes.

- Jean-Marie Riachi - executive producer, arranger, keyboards
- Xavier Escabasse - sound engineer
- Philippe Hervwett - guitar
- Gilbert - kanun
- Ali Madbouh - mizmar, ney
- Raymond Hajj - percussion
- Chahe Kupelian - arrangement, programming assistant (tracks 5, 9, 10)
- Didier Forget - saxophone
- Christian Martinez - trumpet
- Jihad Akl - violin
- Paul Tachdjian - programming assistant
- Tony Haddad - digital mastering
- Ziad Nawfal - translator
- David Abdullah - photography
- Bassam Fattouh - make-up
- Yehia and Zakaria - hair

=== Credits ===
- 5.1 surround sound mastering by Galaxy Studios (London, England)
- 5.1 surround sound mixing by Studio Damiens (France)
- Design and artwork by Mind the Gap (Beirut, Lebanon)
