= Halet Hob =

Halet Hob حالة حب

Studio album by Elissa
- Released: 25 July 2014
- Recorded: 2013–2014
- Studio: Nasser El Assaad; Metropolis (London)
- Genre: Arabic; Arabic pop
- Length: 62:55
- Label: Rotana Records
- Producer: Rotana

Elissa chronology
Asaad Wahda (2012)	Halet Hob حالة حب (2014)	Saharna Ya Leil (2016)

Singles from Halet Hob
- 1. "Hob Kol Hayaty" Released: 12 December 2014; 2. "Ya Merayti" Released: 14 May 2015; 3. "Halet Hob" Released: 1 March 2016

Alternative covers

Halet Hob (Arabic: حالة حب) (English: A State of Love) is the ninth studio album by Lebanese singer Elissa released by Rotana on 25 July 2014, making it her sixth album released by Rotana Records. On the first week of its release, the album managed to rank third on the Billboard World Albums chart. It remained on the chart for three consecutive weeks, ranking seventh and twelfth on the second and third week, respectively. The album also topped the iTunes Store's online sales in the Arab world.

The album included twelve songs with the Egyptian dialect and two songs with the Lebanese dialect.

== Track listing ==
No.	Title	Lyrics	Music	Arranger	Length
1.	"Hob Kol Hayaty" (The Love of My Life)	Ahmed al-Gindi	Madian	Ahmed Abd El Salam	3:34
2.	"Halet Hob" (A State of Love)	Nader Abdallah	Turkish melody	Nasser El Assaad	5:09
3.	"Ya Merayti" (On Mirror)	Ahmed Madi	Ziyad Bourji	Nasser El Assaad	4:30
4.	"Helwa Ya Baladi" (My Beautiful Country)	Marwan Saada	Bernard Liamis · Jeff Barnel	Nasser El Assaad	3:44
5.	"Bataly Tehebeeh" (Stop Loving Him)	Ahmed Marzouq	Mohammed Yahya	Tamim	4:14
6.	"Add El Ayam" (As Long as the Days)	Nader Abdallah	Mohammed Yahya	Walid Sharaqi	4:55
7.	"Insana Bereeaa" (An Innocent Girl)	Salama Ali	Mohammed Yahya	Ahmed Ibrahim	4:54
8.	"Wagat Alby" (You Broke My Heart)	Baha' al-Din Muhammed	Madian	Amr Abdel Fattah	4:55
9.	"Ana Magnoona" (Crazy in Love)	Ayman Qumayha	Osane	Osane	4:45
10.	"Beraghm El Zorouf" (Despite the Circumstances)	Nader Abdallah	Mohammed Yahya	Tamer Ashour	4:52
11.	"Omr Gedid" (A New Life)	Mohammed Yahya	Amir Ta'ima	Tamim	3:52
12.	"Ana Nefssi" (I Wish)	Baha' al-Din Muhammed	Madian	Tamim	4:25
13.	"Law Etaabelna" (If We Had Met)	Baha' al-Din Muhammed	Madian	Tamim	3:59
14.	"Awel Mara" (The Very First Time)	Ismail El Habrouk	Mounir Mourad	Nasser El Assaad	5:07
Total length:					62:55

Notes

- "Halet Hob" is an Arabic-language cover of the 2012 Turkish song "Senden Sonra" by Rafet El Roman.

== Personnel ==
Adapted from the album liner notes.

- Hubert Ghorayeb - executive producer
- Yasser Anwar - mixing
- Tim Young - mastering
- Ahmad Ab El Salam - strings (track 1)
- Moustafa Aslan - guitar (tracks 1, 2, 4, 5, 6, 8, 10, 11, 12, 13)
- Badr El Mostafa - violin (track 1)
- Amer Gado - sound engineer (track 1)
- Majid Jridah - strings section leader (tracks 2, 3, 4, 14)
- Moustafa Bergamali - clarinet (tracks 2, 3)
- Nasser El Assaad - piano (track 3)
- Ousman Osert - percussion (track 4)
- Samer Kousaimy - flute (track 4)
- Mohamed Atif Imam - strings section leader (tracks 5, 11, 12, 13), violin (tracks 5, 11, 12, 13)
- Ahmad Gooda - recording engineer (tracks 5, 11, 12, 13)
- Mahmud Ezzat - recording engineer (tracks 5, 12, 13)
- Ahmad Ragab - bass guitar (tracks 5, 7, 12, 13)
- Maged Soroor - kanun (tracks 5, 6, 11, 12)
- Reda Bder - ney (tracks 5, 6, 11, 12, 13)
- Ahmad Ayadi - tabla (tracks 5, 6, 12, 13)
- Yahia El Mougi - violin (track 6)
- Said Kamal - strings (track 7), strings arrangement (track 8)
- Sherif Fahmi - guitar (track 7)
- Hamouso - clarinet (track 7)
- Carios - percussion (track 7)
- Mohamed Saad - accordion (track 8)
- Mohamed Fawzy - clarinet (track 8)
- Mohamed Esmael - sound engineer (track 8)
- Christina Makarkina - strings section leader (track 9)
- Edyta Majewska - cello (track 9)
- Melinda Popeski - cello (track 9)
- Pavo Filipovic - trombone (track 9)
- Tamer Ghneim - strings section leader (track 10)
- Islam Al Kasbajij - oud (track 10)
- Hisam El Arabi - rek (track 13)
- Shafic Toutayo - guitar (track 14)
- Ali Madbouh - ney (track 14)
- Jihad Asaad - kanun (track 14)
- Eli Rezkallah - creative director
- Bilal Houssami - assistant creative director
- Mohammed Olaymi - graphics
- Matthias Clamer - photography
- Mandy Merheb - fashion consultancy
- Yehia Shokr - hair
- Bassam Fattouh - make up

== Charts ==
Chart (2014)	Peak position
Billboard World Albums	3
