= Al Manara International Conference Center =

Conference center in New Cairo

Al Manara International Conference Center is a conference center located in New Cairo, Egypt. The complex houses 13 different halls. The main part of the complex is the theater which can host up to 1670 guests seated across the main hall. This number includes VIP seats, handicap seats, the upper balcony and 4 VIP cabins. The theater was home to the opening and closing ceremonies of the 2017 Cairo International Film Festival.
