= Sabine (musician) =

Lebanese recording artist and actress (born 1988)

Sabine سابين فوشو
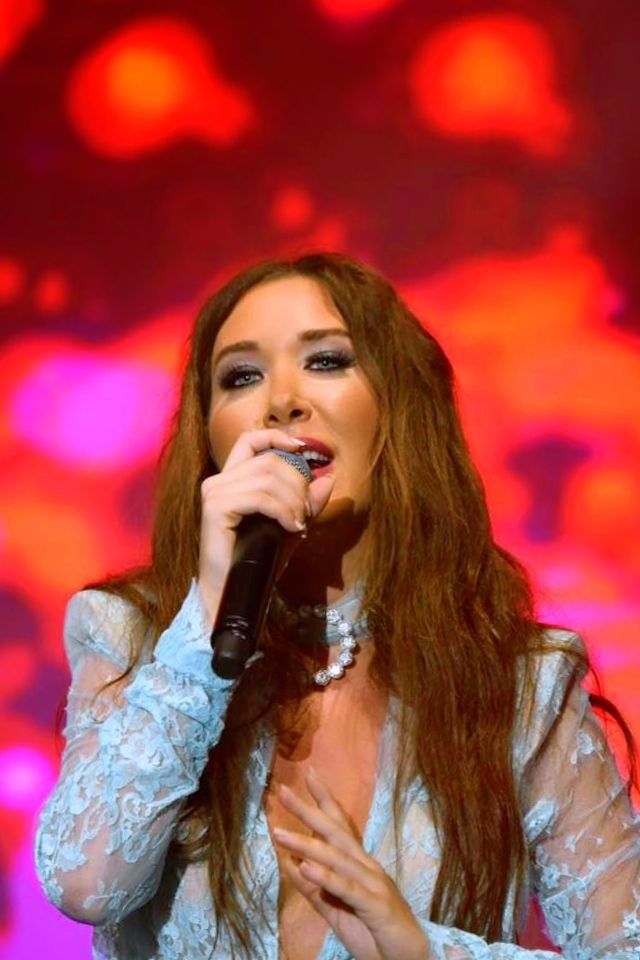
- Sabine performing in a local musical festival of Lebanon, August 2017

Background information
- Born: Sabine Fouchaux; 2 October 1989 (age 37); Saudi Arabia
- Origin: Lebanese-French
- Genres: Arabic pop, World music, Pop, Dance music
- Occupations: Singer, Actress
- Instrument: Vocals
- Years active: 2005–present

Sabine Fouchaux (Arabic: سابين فوشو; born 2 October 1988) is a Lebanese recording artist and actress.

== Early life ==
Sabine was born in Saudi Arabia to a French father and a Lebanese mother.

== Discography ==
- Ba'etli Email
- Bes'al Hali
- Be'tethir Menak
- Barkouli Ya Banat
- Talikni
- Ana ayouni Bihebouk
- Yoh Yoh
- akher hammak
- beyni w beynak ya hal leil
- Ya Khsara
- Mamnoua yezaal
- Ouyouni Bi Hebbouk
- Stop
- Albi bari2
- lesh za3lana
- bashhad ana leek
- Hob No

== Albums ==
- Stop

== TV series ==
- Ahmad and Kristina
- Fakhamat al chak

== Awards ==
- "Universal Studio"
- "BBC Radio"
- "Murex D'or"
