= Asaad Wahda =

Asaad Wahda أسعد واحدة

Studio album by Elissa
- Released: 19 June 2012
- Recorded: 2011–2012
- Studio: Audio Vision (Beirut); Metropolis (London); Can (Istanbul); M. Sound; Leila (Cairo); Al-Resala (Cairo)
- Genre: Arabic; Worldbeat
- Length: 69:19
- Label: Rotana Records
- Producer: Rotana

Elissa chronology
Best of Elissa (2011)	Asaad Wahda أسعد واحدة (2012)	Halet Hob (2014)

Singles from Asaad Wahda
- 1. "Asaad Wahda" Released: 11 January 2013; 2. "Teebt Mennak" Released: 11 August 2013

Asaad Wahda (Arabic: أسعد واحدة) (English: The Happiest One) is the eighth studio album by Lebanese singer Elissa released by Rotana on 19 June 2012, making it her fifth album released by Rotana Records.

== Album background ==
In this album, Elissa shares her theories on the philosophy of happiness, as she spoke to media about the themes of joy and happiness and her own take on it. The album features 10 songs sung in the Egyptian and Lebanese dialects. The singer collaborated with a number of famous writers and composers from around the Arab world like, poet Baha Al Din, composers Mohamed Yahia, Rami Jamal, and Mohamad Dia. Elissa was asked if she was the happiest person as her album implies, to which she answered at full steam:

I am not the happiest person in the world and I do not believe gloating is a way to live my life. I believe there is no such thing as absolute happiness in life and we can acquire happiness through different things in life at different stages. Sometimes we feel happy when we are with the one we love; other times we feel it during success or among family members and loyal true friends, but there is no specific thing in life that can bring a person absolute happiness.

== Artwork ==
Elissa released via Twitter a promotional photo that showed her with a black veil on her head and red rose in her mouth. However, she later declared that the picture shown wasn't really the one for the cover. When the album was released, the album's physical cover had a completely different cover, while the digital versions used the aforementioned photo as the cover.

== Release ==
Originally, the album was set to be released on 25 June 2012, however, eight days before the official release date, Elissa was shocked to discover the entire album had been leaked on different internet websites. Upon discovering the illegal version of the album, Elissa announced on her official pages on the social internet social networks Facebook and Twitter that she would be releasing the album within the next 48 hours in the Middle East. The album was released on 19 June.

== Track listing ==
No.	Title	Lyrics	Music	Arranger	Length
1.	"Fi Ouyounak" (In Your Eyes)	Mohammed Rahim	Mohammed Rahim	Michel Fadel	4:31
2.	"Asaad Wahda" (The Happiest One)	Salama Ali	Mohammed Yahya	Tamim	4:35
3.	"Moutafa'la" (Yes I'm Positive...)	Nader Abdallah	Tamer Ashour	Aytekin Kurt	5:26
4.	"Faker" (Do You Remember?)	Ahmad Marzouq	Mohammad Rahim	Tamim	5:44
5.	"Teebt Mennak" (I'm Fed Up with You)	Salama Ali	Mohammad Yahya	Ahmad Abdel Salam	5:03
6.	"Law A'oulak" (If I Ever Told You)	Hani Abdel Karim	Madeen	Tamim	3:48
7.	"Kerehtak Ana" (Now I Hate You)	Ahmad Madi	Ziad Bourji	Nasser Al Assaad	6:02
8.	"Rohtelo" (There Again)	Nader Abdallah	Nader Abdallah	Aytekin Kurt	4:05
9.	"Eghmerni" (Hold Me Tight)	Siham Shaashaa	Mohammad Rahim	Michel Fadel	5:10
10.	"Haylef W Yergaali" (He Wheels and Deals)	Nader Abdallah	Tamer Ashour	Tamim	4:09
11.	"Alouli El Eid" (Inner Peace)	Romeo Lahoud	Romeo Lahoud	Michel Fadel	4:55
12.	"Albi Hassis Fik" (My Heart Goes Out to You)	Adel Raffoul	Jean Saliba	Aytekin Kurt	5:05
13.	"Sa'at" (Sometimes)	Bahaa Ed Deen Mohammad	Mohammad Diyaa	Claude Chalhoub	5:05
14.	"Lola El Malama" (Were It Not for the Blame)	Morsi Jameel Aziz	Mohammad Abdel Wahab	Nasser Al Assaad	5:34
Total length:					69:19

== Personnel ==
Adapted from the album liner notes.

- Hubert Ghorayeb - executive producer
- Edouard Meunier - mixing
- Farouk Mohamed Hasan - accordion (tracks 2, 4, 10)
- Ammar Trad - accordion (track 11)
- Ahmed Ragab - bass guitar (tracks 4, 10)
- Hisham Essam - bouzouki (track 6)
- Mohamed Atif Imam - conductor [string section] (tracks 2, 4, 6, 10)
- Philippe M. - guitar (track 1)
- Mostafa Aslan - guitar (tracks 2, 4, 5, 6, 10)
- Jihad Assaad - kanun (track 11)
- Maged Soroor - kanun (tracks 2, 6, 10)
- Reda Beder - ney (tracks 2, 6, 10)
- Ihab Boo - percussion (track 4)
- Mohamed Saleh - percussion (track 11)
- Elie Barbar - vocals recording (tracks 2, 3, 6, 7, 8, 9, 10, 13)
- Maurice Tawile - vocals recording (tracks 1, 4, 5, 11, 12, 14)
- Nidal Abo Samra - soprano saxophone (track 9)
- Tamer Ghoneim - strings (track 5)
- Ahmed Ayadi - tabla (tracks 2, 10)
- Hisham El Arabi - tambourine (tracks 2, 10)
- Mohamed Atif Imam - violin (track 2)
- Mohamed Medhat - violin (track 4)
- Mahmoud Soroor - violin (track 10)
- Nazir Mawas - violin (track 1)
- Abdallah Ziade - strings section recording (tracks 1, 9)
- Ahmad Gouda - sound engineer (tracks 2, 10)
- Aytekin Kurt - sound engineer (tracks 3, 8, 12)
- Hani Mahrous - sound engineer (track 4)
- Amir Mahrous - guitar recording (track 7)
- Matthias Clamer - photographer
- Bassam Fattouh - make up
- Yehia Shokr - hair

== Charts ==
Chart (2012)	Peak position
Billboard World Albums	13
