= Saharna Ya Leil =

Saharna Ya Leil سهرنا يا ليل

Studio album by Elissa
- Released: 9 September 2016
- Recorded: 2015–2016
- Studio: Nasser El Assaad; Metropolis (London); Alresala (Cairo); Studio 5; Leila (Cairo)
- Genre: Arabic; Arabic pop
- Length: 71:43
- Label: Rotana Music Group
- Producer: Rotana

Elissa chronology
Halet Hob (2014)	Saharna Ya Leil سهرنا يا ليل (2016)	Ila Kol Elli Bihebbouni (2018)

Singles from Saharna Ya Leil
- 1. "Saharna Ya Leil" Released: 29 June 2016; 2. "Maliket El Ehsas" Released: 2 August 2016; 3. "Aaks Elli Shayfenha" Released: 19 July 2017

Alternative cover
- Physical cover

Saharna Ya Leil (Arabic: سهرنا يا ليل) (English: Keep Us Up, Night) is the tenth studio album by Lebanese singer Elissa released by Rotana on 9 September 2016. The album debuted at #5 on the Billboard World Albums chart. The promotional singles "Maliket El Ehsas" and "Saharna Ya Leil" preceded the album's release.

== Singles and music videos ==
- "Saharna Ya Leil" was released as a promotional single on 29 June 2016 on Anghami. A music video directed by Angy Jammal premiered on Rotana's YouTube account on 18 November 2016.
- "Maliket El Ehsas" was released as a promotional single on 2 August 2016.
- A music video for "Aaks Elli Shayfenha", directed by Angy Jammal, premiered on 19 July 2017. The video depicts the life of Lebanese belly dancer Dany Bustros, who had committed suicide in December 1998 after being severely depressed by the death of her son four years earlier. Fans praised the video as powerful, touching and important regarding mental health awareness. The video had garnered over 3 million views on YouTube and 8 million views on Anghami within one week of being released.
- "Ya Rait" (alternatively romanised as "Ya Rayt" or "Ya Reit") is the theme song for the 2016 Ramadan television series of the same name and was released digitally on 16 May. A music video directed by Manolis Ibrahim was later released on 21 May and has amassed over 100 million views on YouTube as of July 2022. The song was later included on "Saharna Ya Leil" as a bonus track.
- Despite not being released as a single, the lyric video for the song "Maktooba Leek" garnered over 200 million views on YouTube and is the most viewed video on Rotana's official YouTube channel.

== Track listing ==
No.	Title	Lyrics	Music	Arranger	Length
1.	"Saharna Ya Leil" (Keep Us Up All Night)	Malak Adel	Mohamed Yehia	Yehia Youssef	4:16
2.	"Wala Baad Senin" (Not in a Million Years)	Nader Abdallah	Nezih Üçler	Nasser El Assaad	4:34
3.	"Aaks Elli Shayfenha" (The Opposite of What You See)	Amir Teima	Walid Saad	Ahmed Ibrahim	4:26
4.	"Maliket El Ehsas" (Queen of Feelings)	Oussama Moustafa	Samer Abou Taleb	Tamim	4:43
5.	"Fall El Haki" (The Words Have Left)	Youssef Sleiman	Salah Al Kurdi	Nasser El Assaad	5:02
6.	"Motamareda" (Rebel)	Ahmed El Gandy	Madian	Amr Ismael	4:53
7.	"Metlak Ma Fi Ensan" (There's No One Like You)	Oussama Moustafa	Samer Abou Taleb	Nasser El Assaad	4:44
8.	"Omry Ebtada" (My Life Began)	Ahmed El Gandy	Madian	Tamim	3:29
9.	"Hatsebni" (You're Leaving Me?)	Ahmed Marzouk	Mohammed Rahim	Tamim	5:07
10.	"Aghla El Habayeb" (Dearest Lover)	Ahmed Marzouq	Madian	Ahmed Abdel Salam	3:18
11.	"Hakhaf Men Eah" (What's Scaring Me?)	Nader Abdallah	Mohamed Yehia	Ahmad Ibrahim	4:45
12.	"Alb W Rouh" (Heart and Soul)	Oussama Moustafa	Samer Abou Taleb	Tamim	5:00
13.	"Mesh Arfa Laih" (I Don't Know Why)	Bahaa El Dine Mohammed	Madian	Ahmed Abdel Salam	3:35
14.	"Maktooba Leek" (Destined for You)	Nader Abdallah	Mohamed Yehia	Walid Sharaki	5:16
15.	"El Hodn" (Hugs)	Salama Ali	Cherif Badr	Yehia Youssef	4:03
16.	"Ya Rait" (I Wish)	Salah Al Kurdi	Salah Al Kurdi	Nasser El Assaad	4:32
Total length:					71:43

Notes

- "Wala Baad Senin" is an Arabic-language cover of the 2015 Turkish song "Git Diyemem" by Ezo.

== Personnel ==
Adapted from the album liner notes.

- Hubert Ghorayeb - executive producer
- Bilal Houssami - producer
- Yasser Anwar - mixing, sound engineer (track 6)
- Tim Young - mastering
- Ahmad Fakri - strings (track 1)
- Ahmed Fikry - strings section leader (track 1)
- Mustafa Aslan - guitar (tracks 1, 3, 4, 8, 9, 10, 12, 13), acoustic guitar (track 15)
- Ahmed Ragab - bass guitar (tracks 1, 3, 8, 9, 11, 12, 14, 15)
- Reda Bdeir - ney (track 1)
- Sherif Kamel - kanun (track 1)
- Ahmed El Ayadi - tabla (tracks 1, 10)
- Mahmoud Izzat - recording (tracks 1, 11, 14)
- Majd Jureida - strings recording (tracks 2, 5, 7)
- Ayhan - guitar (tracks 2, 5, 7, 16)
- Ismail Ozan - bass guitar (tracks 2, 16)
- Hamuso - clarinet (tracks 3, 9), dudok (track 4), saxophone (track 12)
- Said Kamal - string arrangement (track 3), string recording (track 16)
- Mohamad Ismail - string recording (track 3)
- Mohamed Atef Imam - string section leader (tracks 4, 6, 8, 9, 12), violin (tracks 4, 8)
- Ahmad Gouda - recording (tracks 4, 8, 9, 12)
- Mustafa Burak - kanun (track 5)
- Koray Özyıldız️️️ - ney (track 5)
- Manaf - bass guitar (track 5)
- Mostafa Nasr - guitar (track 6)
- Nadim Nakhla - cajon (track 6)
- Hakan - saxophone (track 7)
- Murat Yıldırım - saxophone (track 7)
- Ahmad Khairy - ney (tracks 8, 12)
- Hassan Said - violin (tracks 9, 13), string section leader (track 10), string arrangement (track 11)
- Islam Kasabji - oud (track 10)
- Rami Sleiman - recording (track 10)
- Sherif Said - guitar (track 11)
- Sherif Fahmi - guitar (tracks 11, 14)
- Saad Mohamed Hassan - violin (track 15)
- Fady Badr - kanun (track 15)
- Mohamed Medhat - string section leader (track 15)
- Mohamed Sakr - recording (track 15)
- Buland - clarinet (track 16)
- Eli Rezkallah - photographer
- Samer Rawadi - assistant photographer
- Konstantin Klimin - assistant photographer
- Mandy Merheb - fashion consultancy
- Georges Mendelek - hair
- Christian Abou Haidar - make up

== Charts ==
Chart (2016)	Peak position
Billboard World Albums	5
