= Jean-Marie Riachi =

Lebanese musician

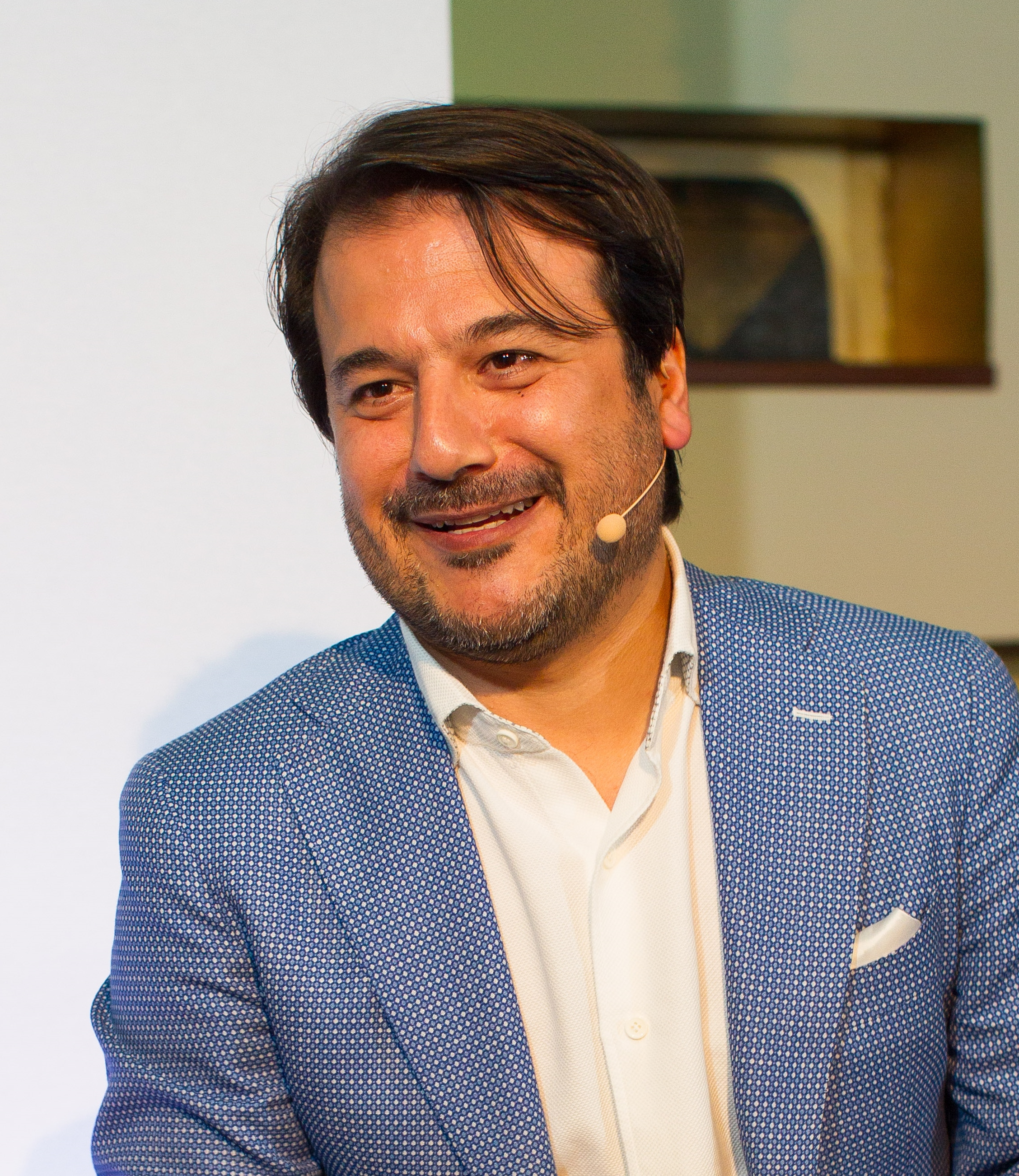

Background information
- Born: May 24, 1970 (age 56); Ras Baalbek, Bekaa, Lebanon
- Origin: Rabieh
- Occupations: Music arranger, composer, record producer
- Website: www.jeanmarieriachi.com

Jean-Marie Riachi (Arabic: جان ماري رياشي, born May 24, 1970, at Ras Baalbek) is a Lebanese musician, arranger, composer and producer.

== Biography ==
Born on May 24, 1970, in Ras Baalbek, he graduated in musicology from the Holy Spirit University of Kaslik (USEK) university, and later began his music career performing in local bars and clubs.

In 1988 he participated in Studio el Fan, a Lebanese talent show, where he performed the keyboards.

In 1999, Riachi launched his musical production and composing career when he produced his first single performed by Elissa, Baddi Doub.

In 2001 he established his own Jean Marie Audio Productions studio in Rabieh, Lebanon.

In 2006, he arranged the song “Light the Way” which was sung by Majida El Roumi and José Carreras in Doha at the 2006 Asian Games opening ceremony.

In 2009, he produced the album “Belaaks” with the singers Ramy Ayach and Yara, which is a fusion style or oriental and jazz, and produced many albums for artists like the Majida El Roumi's (called Ghazal) and a Christmas album (called Castana), as well as other hits for the most famous Arabic singers: Nawal El Zoghbi, Haifa Wehbe, Latifa, Rami Ayach. He currently is the producer of The Voice, the Arabic edition of the international talent show, and he has won many Music Awards including the Lebanese prestigious Murex D’or.

== Awards ==
- 2003 - Murex D’or: Best Song: "Ayshalak" by Elissa
- 2004 - World Music Awards: "Ma Trouhsh Beid" by Latifa
- 2005 - World Music Awards: Best-Selling Album in Lebanon and North Africa: "Ahla Donya" by Elissa
- 2006 - Murex D’or: Best Composition and Arrangement, Habaytak Ana”, by Rami Ayach
- 2008 - Murex D’or: Best Movie Soundtrack for “Sea of Stars”
- 2008 - Murex D’or: Best Music Arranger
- 2010 - Platinum Award: Best-selling album in the Middle-East: “Belaaks”
- 2012 - Zahrit el Khalij: Best music arranger and producer
- 2012 - Bisara7a.com: Best music arranger and producer
- 2013 - Green Award by the Ministry of Environment and UNDP

== See also ==
- Elias Rahbani
- Tarek Abou Jaoude
- Hadi Sharara
- Guy Manoukian
- Maritta Hallani
