= Ayami Bik =

Ayami Bik أيامي بيك

Studio album by Elissa
- Released: 18 December 2007
- Recorded: 2007
- Studio: Audio Vision (Beirut); Nasser El Assaad; Tarek Madkour; Hadi Sharara (Beirut); Boudy Naoum; Talkies Sound
- Genre: Arabic
- Length: 50:40
- Label: Rotana Records
- Producer: Rotana

Elissa chronology
Bastanak (2006)	Ayami Bik أيامي بيك (2007)	Tesada'a Bemeen (2009)

Singles from Ayami Bik
- 1. "Betmoun" Released: 18 June 2008; 2. "Awakher Al Shita" Released: 2 March 2009

Ayami Bik (Arabic: أيامي بيك) (English: My Days with You) is the sixth studio album by Lebanese recording artist Elissa, released on 18 December 2007 by Rotana. Following up to her 2006 album Bastanak, the album contains 11 tracks. The album debuted at #1 across Arab charts and remained in the top position for more than three months and garnered various awards.

The singles "Betmoun" and "Awaker El Shita" had music videos directed by Waleed Nassif and premiered on Rotana Mousica in June 2008 and March 2009 respectively.

== Background and composition ==
Recorded and released a year after her fifth studio album Bastanak, Ayami Bik is Elissa's third album released with Rotana after signing to the label in 2004. For the album, Elissa collaborated with Lebanese singer-songwriter Marwan Khoury, despite stating that she would never work with him again. Khoury later contributed the song "Betmoun". The album's musical style ranges from traditional Arabic instrumentals to electronic synth-pop.

== Commercial performance and reception ==
Ayami Bik was released during the Islamic Eid al-Adha holiday in 2007 and debuted at #1 on various Arab music charts. In Egypt alone, the album sold over 150,000 copies in its first week; prompting Rotana to produce another batch of copies after initially printing 120,000. The album continued to top sales charts in Lebanese Virgin Megastores retailers for over three months during 2008.

To promote the album, Elissa performed the album's titular song on Mission Fashion 2007 on LBC TV. During the 2007 Christmas season, Rotana fixed prices of CDs by dropping them down seventy-percent in an effort to boost sales after suffering from losses due to online piracy. Tabloids also noted Rotana's production of cassette tapes, which proved popular in Beirut.

Elissa along with the song "Moush Kiteer Aaleik" appeared in a Samsung phone advert for the M3510 "Beat" model. She was also announced to be an ambassador for a Samsung campaign focused on music.

== Accolades ==
Elissa garnered two Murex d'Or awards for 'Best Lebanese Song' and 'Best Video Clip' for "Betmoun" as well as a Middle East Music Award for 'Best Arab Singer' in recognition for the album.

== Track listing ==
Credits and English titles adapted from the liner notes of Ayami Bik.

No.	Title	Lyrics	Music	Arranger	Length
1.	"Ayami Bik (Wana A'dar)" (My Days with You [And I Can...])	Nader Abdullah	Tamer Ali	Tamim	4:40
2.	"Khod Balak Alaya" (Take Care of Me)	Abdullah	Waleed Saad	Hani Siblini · Walid Mimna	5:30
3.	"Betmoun" (I Owe You)	Marwan Khoury	Khoury	Claude Chalhoub	4:04
4.	"Ya Aalem" (Who Knows?)	Abdullah	Ali	Nasser El Assaad · Ahmed Ibrahim	5:14
5.	"Law Ma Tiji" (If Only You Would Come)	Nizar Francis	Samir Sfeir	Tarek Madkour	4:34
6.	"Moush Kiteer Aaleik" (It Wouldn't Be Much for You)	Amir Ta'eimah	Ali	Dani Helou	4:29
7.	"Adik Ereft" (So Now You Know)	Mohad Goda	Sherif Taj	Hani Sibilini	4:50
8.	"Aala Hobbak" (To Your Love)	Ahmad Madi	El Assaad	El Assaad	3:38
9.	"Ana Bastaghrab Aalei" (I Wonder About Him)	Mohammed Rifai	Ayman Mohseb	Helou	4:28
10.	"Saher Eini" (Let My Eyes Stay Awake All Night)	Ahmad Madi	Yehya Al Hasan	Chalhoub	4:35
11.	"Awakher Al Shita" (The End of Winter)	Abdullah	Ali	Tamim	4:32
Total length:					50:40

== Personnel ==
Adapted from the album liner notes.

- Hubert Ghorayeb - executive producer
- Tony Haddad - mastering
- Edward Meunier - mixing
- Tarek Madkour - mixing (track 5)
- Said Imam - audio producer
- Faruk Mohamed Hassan - accordion (track 4)
- Albert Mansour - acoustic guitar (track 9)
- Mounir El Khawli - acoustic guitar and electric guitar (tracks 2, 7)
- Alain Ouejan - guitar (tracks 10, 11)
- Tarek Salhiye - guitar (track 4)
- Mostafa Aslan - guitar (track 5)
- Jihad Assaad - kanun (track 3)
- Raymon El Hajj - percussion (track 2)
- Toni Anka - percussion (tracks 3, 10)
- Elie Barbar - recording (track 11)
- Mohamed Kebbe - recording (tracks 2, 3, 7, 10)
- Maurice Tawile - recording (tracks 6, 9)
- Hadi Sharara - recording (track 1)
- Maurice Tawile - voice recording and editing
- Nasser El Assaad - voice recording and editing (tracks 4, 8)
- Nidal Abou Samra - sopranino saxophone (track 9) and tenor saxophone (track 6)
- Claude Shalhoub - strings (tracks 1, 3, 7, 10, 11)
- Yehia El Mouji - violin (track 5)
- Mathias Clamer - photographer
- HIA Yehia And Zakaria - hair
- Bassam Fattouh - make-up
- Ziad Nawfal - translator
