= Bastanak =

Bastanak بستناك

Studio album by Elissa
- Released: 16 February 2006
- Recorded: 2005–2006
- Studio: Audio Vision (Beirut); Electra; Talkies Sound
- Genre: Arabic; Arabic pop
- Length: 58:37
- Label: Rotana Records
- Producer: Rotana

Elissa chronology
Ahla Dounya (2004)	Bastanak بستناك (2006)	Ayami Bik (2007)

Singles from Bastanak
- 1. "Bastanak"; 2. "Law Taarafou"

Bastanak (Arabic: بستناك) (English: Waiting for You) is the fifth studio album by Lebanese singer Elissa released by Rotana on 16 February 2006, making it her second album released by Rotana Records. The album sold more than 3.7 million copies by October 2006, and earned Elissa the World Music Award for the best-selling artist in the Middle East and North Africa for the second time in a row. As a result, Routledge named Elissa one of the world's most popular singers in 2006.

The album included twelve songs and a bonus remix track, many of which have been translated into other languages. "Bastanak" was translated into Turkish, and two versions in Hindi were released as well. "Fatet Sineen" was also transferred to Turkish, and an Egyptian cover was voiced by Hamou Beka. "Kermalak" and "Law Taarafou" were translated into Turkish, and "Hikayti Maak" was translated into Bulgarian.

== Track listing ==
No.	Title	Lyrics	Music	Arranger	Length
1.	"Bastanak" (Waiting for You)	Faisal Hamami	Tamer Ali	Dany El Helou · Tamim	3:57
2.	"Kermalak" (For You)	Marwan Khoury	Marwan Khoury	Claude Chalhoub	4:58
3.	"Fatet Sineen" (Years Went By)	Mohammed Hamed	Tamer Ali	Dany El Helou · Tamim	4:06
4.	"Zanbi Ana" (It's My Fault)	Marwan Khoury	Marwan Khoury	Dany El Helou	4:37
5.	"Baaich Ala Hissak" (I Live by Your Breath)	Nader Abdallah	Yasser Nour	Michel Fadel	4:22
6.	"Tlob Itmana" (Ask and Wish)	Nizar Francis	Samir Sfeir	Michel Fadel	4:22
7.	"Taa" (Come)	Elias Nasser	George Karam	Michel Fadel	4:36
8.	"Matkhafch Minni" (Don't Be Afraid of Me)	Nader Abdallah	Yasser Nour	Michel Fadel · Khalid Nabil	4:20
9.	"Hikayti Maak" (My Story with You)	Nader Abdallah	Tamer Ashour	Mazen Siblini	5:19
10.	"Law Basset Eddamak" (If You Look in Front of You)	Nader Abdallah	Mohamed Al Sawi	Michel Fadel	4:05
11.	"Law Kan" (If)	Mounir Bou Assaf	Nouhad Najjar	Michel Fadel	4:37
12.	"Law Taarafou" (If You Knew Him)	Nader Abdallah	Nader Nour	Hani Siblini	4:13

CD bonus song
No.	Title	Length
13.	"Kermalak (Remix)"	4:58
Total length:		58:37

== Personnel ==
Adapted from the album liner notes.

- Tony Haddad - mastering
- Edward Meunier - mixing
- Charbel Mounayer - sound engineer
- Alain Owaijan - acoustic guitar (tracks 2, 9, 12)
- Mohamed Saleh - bouzouki (track 5)
- Maurice Tawile - editor, recording (tracks 1, 3, 4, 9) and vocals recording
- Dergham Owainati - executive producer
- Jerome Degey - electric guitar (track 1)
- Jerome Degey - acoustic guitar (tracks 3, 5, 6, 7, 10, 11)
- Tony Campbell - guitar (tracks 1, 4)
- Gilbert Yammine - kanun (tracks 6, 12)
- Jihad Assaad - kanun (track 11)
- Ali Madbouh - ney (track 12)
- Raymond Hajj - percussion (tracks 1, 12)
- Mohamed Saleh - percussion (tracks 2, 5, 7)
- Ralph Khoury - percussion (track 5)
- Camille Khoury - percussion (track 11)
- Dany El Helou - piano (track 4)
- Mazin Siblini - piano (track 9)
- Said Imam - production manager
- Charbel Mounayer - recording (track 5, 6, 7, 8, 10, 11)
- Mohamed Kebbe - recording (tracks 2, 9, 12)
- Nidal Abu Samra - saxophone (track 4)
- Hratch Assis - soprano saxophone (track 9)
- Claude Chalhoub - strings (tracks 2, 9, 12)
- Raymond Nassif - strings (tracks 1, 3, 4, 5, 6, 7, 8, 10, 11)
- Ziad Nawfal - translator
- Matthias Clamer - photography
- Bassam Fattouh - make up
- Yehia and Zakaria - hair
