= Elissa (singer) =

Lebanese singer (born 1971)

Elissa إليسا
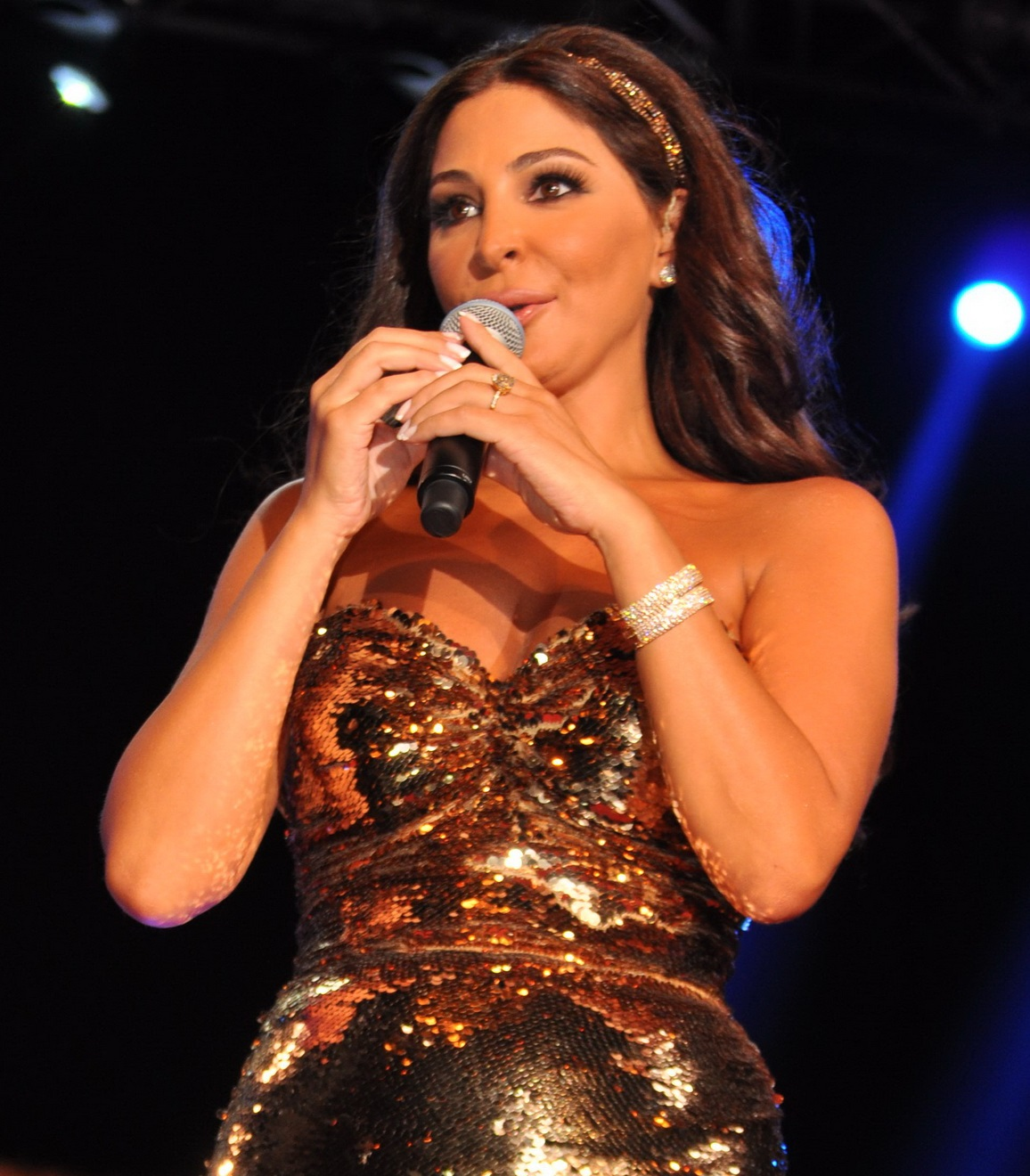
- Elissa in August 2012

Background information
- Born: Elissar Zakaria Khoury; 27 October 1971 (age 55); Deir Al-Ahmar, Lebanon
- Genres: Arabic pop; romance; world
- Occupations: Singer; television personality; businesswoman
- Instrument: Vocals
- Years active: 1989–present
- Labels: Lido (1998); Dilara/Music Master (1999–2002); Rotana (2003–2020); E-Records (2022–present); Rotana (distributor)

Elissar Zakaria Khoury (Arabic: إليسار زكريا خوري; born 27 October 1971), commonly known as Elissa (Arabic: إليسا), is a Lebanese singer and television personality. Known for her romantic musical style and emotive vocal performances, she has been dubbed as the "Queen of Emotions". Her musical career began in 1992 when she was featured in the Lebanese talent show Studio El Fan; later being awarded the silver medal. In 1998, she released her debut studio album Baddy Doub through EMI Music Arabia. Her second album W'akherta Maak (2000) featured the single "Betghib Betrouh", a duet with Ragheb Alama.

Elissa's breakthrough occurred with her 2002 single "Ayshalak", from the third studio album of the same name, which was a substantial commercial success. After signing with record label Rotana, she released the albums Ahla Dounya (2004), Bastanak (2006), Ayami Bik (2007), Tesada'a Bemeen (2009), Asaad Wahda (2012), Halet Hob (2014), Saharna Ya Leil (2016), Ila Kol Elli Bihebbouni (2018) and Sahbit Raey (2020); eventually becoming Rotana's best-selling artist. Following a dispute over her masters and the withdrawal of her catalogue from platforms like Spotify, YouTube and Anghami, Elissa launched her own record label, E-Records, in 2022, and has since released the albums Ana Sekketen (2024) and Elissar (2026).

Elissa is one of the best-selling music artists of the Middle East; having sold 30 million albums throughout her career. She has additionally garnered over 1 billion streams on Anghami, making her the most-streamed female artist and the second most-streamed overall on the platform, as well as over 7 billion views on YouTube, making her the most streamed Arab artist on the platform. In 2005, Elissa became the first Lebanese artist to win the World Music Award for "Best Selling Middle Eastern Artist" in recognition of the sales of Ahla Dounya. She won the award again in 2006 and 2010 for Bastanak and Tesada'a Bemeen respectively, becoming the first and only female artist to win in the category more than once. In 2007, she was nominated for Best Arabian Act at the 2007 MTV Europe Music Awards. Throughout her career, she has endorsed brands, such as Corum and Pepsi and is also a women's rights activist; raising awareness on specific subjects such as women's rights in Lebanon and breast cancer awareness.

== Early life ==
Elissar Zakaria Khoury was born on 27 October 1972 in Deir Al-Ahmar, Lebanon to a Lebanese father, Zakaria Khoury, who was a poet and a Syrian-Lebanese mother, Youmna Suud from Wadi al-Nasara and Marjayoun. She has three brothers named Ghassan, Camil, Jihad and two sisters, Norma and Rita. Elissa and her siblings were later raised in the Beqaa Valley. On the day of her birth, she was delivered by a midwife due to the lack of hospitals at her birthplace; her grandmother had left her as she was not a boy. Throughout her childhood, she had a very close relationship with her father, as well as her sister Norma; being very heartbroken when she had gotten married and moved away while Elissa was 14 years old. Elissa revealed that she had a difficult childhood due to witnessing frequent disputes between her parents; additionally noting that while her father was a calm person, her mother was stricter and harsh. At the request of her father, she and her sister Norma attended a French boarding school, where one of the nuns known as "Sister Samira" had discovered her musical talent.

Elissa graduated from the Lebanese University with a degree in political science. Although she had a degree in politics, she was additionally interested in making music. Therefore, after graduating, she decided to pursue a professional career in show business and in music.

== Career ==
=== 1989–1992: Career beginnings, Studio El Fan and Baddy Doub ===
In 1989, Elissa began her career when she appeared in theatrical comedy plays written by Lebanese actor Wassim Tabbara (1943–2005), acting and singing professionally under her birth name "Elissar Khoury" from the age of 16. She later moved to the "Théâtre de 10 Heures" in 1991.

Elissa's musical career began the following year, when she enlisted in the Lebanese talent show Studio El Fan, singing songs such as "In Rah Mennek Ya Ain" by Shadia and later winning the silver medal. After doing so, her contract on the series was terminated, as showrunner Simon Asmar was unconvinced of her talent. Following this, she also attempted to begin a career in television, applying with stations such as LBC.

=== 1998–2001: Debut studio album Baddy Doub and W'akherta Maak ===
Elissa's debut studio album Baddy Doub, was released in Lebanon in December 1998 by Lido Musique, later given wider distribution in the Arab world by EMI Music Arabia in early 1999. On the album's titular single, she collaborated with Spanish singer, Gerard Ferrer; he additionally appeared on various songs on the album. The single's music video was directed by Marc Hadifé.

Her second album, W'akherta Maak was released on 8 August 2000 by Music Master. The album included the duet "Betghib Betrouh" featuring Ragheb Alama. The song was a considerable success and later won awards. A music video for the album's titular song "W'akherta Maak" was released.

=== 2002–06: Breakthrough, Ayshalak and Ahla Dounya ===
After renewing her contract with label Music Master, Elissa's third studio album Ayshalak was released on 14 June 2002 to huge commercial success and is known as her breakthrough. The album topped Arab music charts for numerous weeks and later sold 2.9 million copies. It was additionally the best selling cassette album in the Middle East of 2002. A music video for the titular song was directed by Fabrice Begotti and was filmed in Paris. She was the first Middle Eastern artist to collaborate with Dior in the video. On 14 September, Elissa won the Murex d'Or award for Best Lebanese Female Artist. In 2002, she was additionally mentioned in the book "Pioneers from Lebanon" alongside artists such as Fairuz and Wadih El Safi. A music video for "Ajmal Ihssas", directed by Salim el Turk, was released in the following year. The video received controversy for what was considered sexualised scenes. However, it won the award "Best Video Clip" at the Arab Music Awards, held in Dubai in 2002. The song was featured on a Rolling Stone poll titled "The 50 Best Arabic Pop Songs of the 21st Century", ranking at #14.

In January 2002, Elissa performed at the STARS (Science, Technology and Arts Royal Summit) charity event in Dubai; being the only artist to attend and perform at the event. In attendance were Queen Rania of Jordan, Mohammed bin Rashid Al Maktoum and former United States President Bill Clinton. Later in 2002, she collaborated with Irish singer Chris de Burgh in a duet titled "Lebanese Nights", featured on his album Timing is Everything. A music video, directed by Salim el Turk, was shot in Beirut, Lebanon and Zurich, Switzerland and premiered exclusively on LBC television stations. The song had received positive reception from both Middle Eastern and western audiences. In January 2003, Elissa attended the grand opening of Kuwait's Virgin Megastore with Sir Richard Branson as well as Kuwaiti band Guitara.

In 2003, Elissa signed with Saudi Arabian entertainment group Rotana, under which she released her fourth studio album, Ahla Dounya the following year on 6 May. The album was a huge success, selling about 3.4 million copies by the end of 2004. The album spawned the singles "Koul Youm Fee Oumri", "Irjaa Lilshowk" and "Hobak Wajaa (Inta Lameen)". The tracks "Koul Youm Fee Oumri", "Karibli" and "Law Nirjaa Sawa" were featured in Pepsi advertisements. In 2005, Elissa became the first Lebanese artist to ever receive a World Music Award for Best Selling Middle Eastern Artist. The ceremony took place at the Kodak Theatre (currently known as the Dolby Theatre) on 31 August and was later broadcast on 13 September. Later, she received the Murex d'Or awards for Best Lebanese Artist and Best Video Clip for "Hobak Wajaa".

On 16 February 2006, she released her fifth studio album Bastanak to similarly substantial commercial success. The album featured the hit single of the same name and "Law Taarafou", both of which received music videos. On 15 November, Elissa received her second World Music Award in a row for the sales of this album. As of 2006, Bastanak had sold 3.7 million copies.

=== 2007–11: Further success, Ayami Bik and Tesada'a Bemeen ===
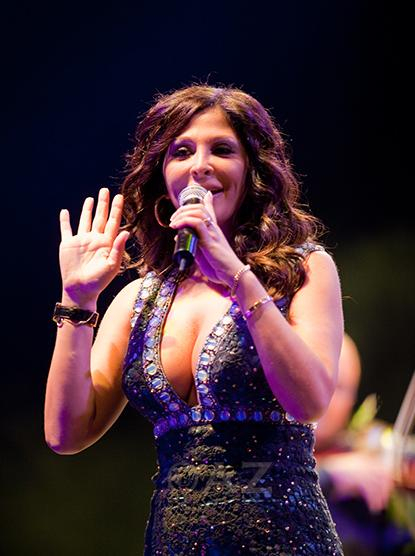
Elissa in 2009

Elissa's sixth studio album Ayami Bik was released on 18 December 2007. Including one of Elissa's bigger hits "Betmoun" as well as "Awakher Al Shita", "Ayami Bik" and "Khod Balak Alaya". Tesada'a Bemeen, her seventh studio album, was released on 26 December 2009 to massive commercial success and included one of her signature songs "Aa Bali Habibi" and the titular song of the same name, both of which received music videos. Elissa garnered her third World Music Award for the album. In November 2010, she was awarded the prize for "Best Arab Female Artist" in the Jordan Music Awards and the Big Apple Music Award for "Best Female Artist" in the Middle East a few days later. Tesada'a Bemeen received critical acclaim for its differing and darker themes and stronger vocal delivery throughout the album.

=== 2012–15: Asaad Wahda, Halet Hob, and MBC The X Factor ===
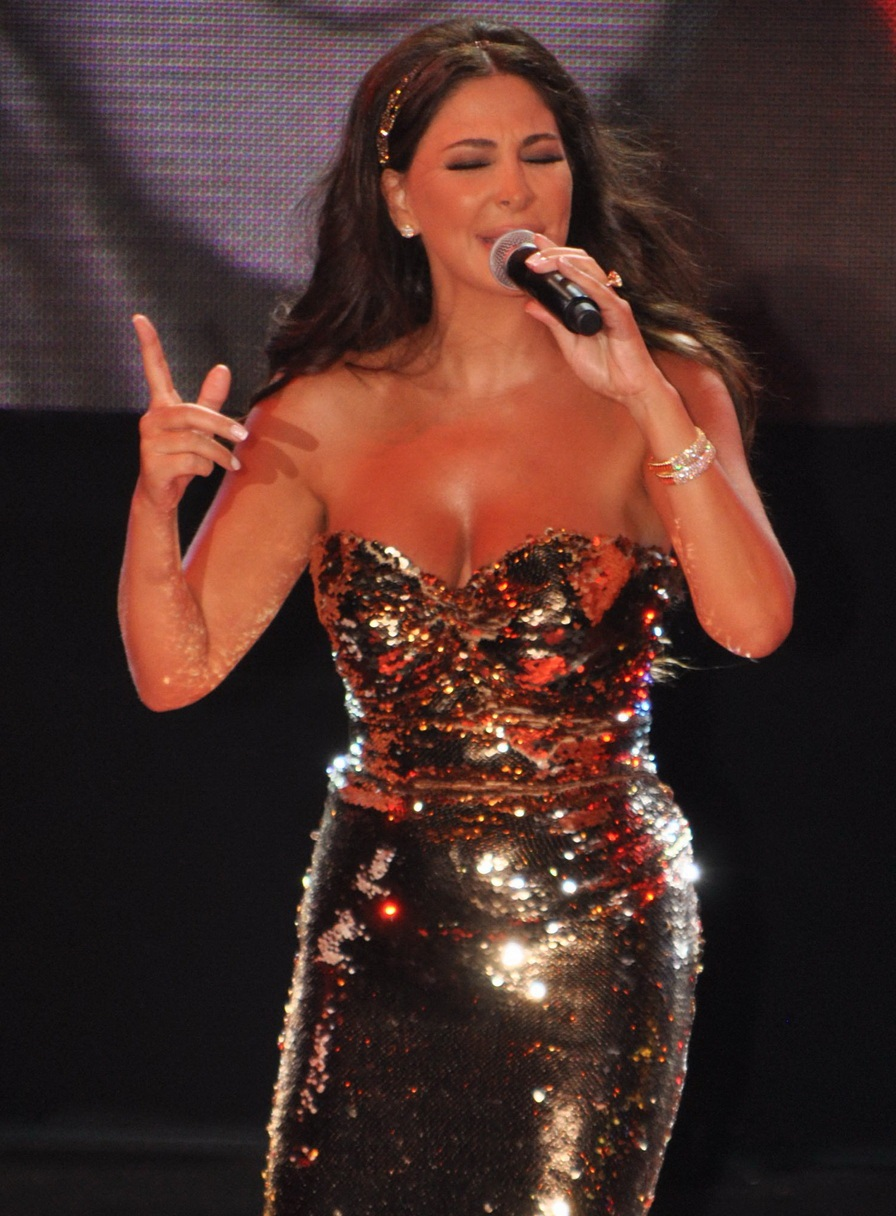
Elissa in 2012

Her eighth studio album, Asaad Wahda, was released on 19 June 2012. The album spawned music videos for the titular song and "Teebt Mennak". The latter's video was released the following year. During the summer of 2012, Elissa released the title song for the Maa Sabk Al Esrar series. In December 2012, Elissa was chosen to be one of the judges of The X Factor Arabia; It was on the air the first four months of 2013. On 23 June 2013 Elissa received two Murex D’or awards, for the Best Lebanese Singer and Best Arabic Song for "Asaad Wahda". During the summer of 2014, Elissa released a song titled "Law" (What If), composed by Marwan Khoury.

Elissa released her ninth studio album Halet Hob in July 2014. The album included covers of the songs "Awel Mara" and "Helwa Ya Baladi" . She released the first music video of "Hob Kol Hayaty" on 12 December 2014. Elissa returned as a judge on The X Factor for its second season on 14 March 2015. Elissa released her cover version of "Mawtini" on 29 April 2015, along with its music video. The second video from her ninth studio album was released on 14 May 2015, for "Ya Merayti". The titular song was released as the final single in early 2016. The lyric video of "Halet Hob" has amassed more than 100 million views on YouTube.

=== 2016–17: Saharna Ya Leil ===
Elissa released her tenth studio album Saharna Ya Leil on 9 September 2016, which included the titular single of the same name, "Maliket El Ehsas" and "Aaks Elli Shayfenha." Despite not being released as a single, the lyric video for "Maktooba Leek" amassed over 270 million views (as of March 2024) on Rotana's official YouTube page, becoming the most watched video on their channel. The following year, Elissa released a music video for "Aaks Elli Shayfenha". Directed by Angy Jammal, the video reached 3 million views during its first week of release and as of August 2019, has garnered over 60 million views on YouTube. In May 2017, Elissa announced that she is the new face of Freshlook Air Optix Colors.

In August 2017, Elissa was featured on Forbes Middle East English edition's August cover and gave a concert as part of Beirut Holidays Festival 2017. On 14 August, Elissa released a remix for the song "Ana Majnouni" which was previously released 3 years ago. "Ana Majnouni" marked the third collaboration with her brother Camil Khoury and amassed more than half a million plays during its first 2 days of release. In early September, it was announced that Elissa will be one of the new The Voice: Ahla Sawt season 4 coaches alongside Emirati singer Ahlam, Lebanese singer Assi El Hallani, and Egyptian singer Mohamed Hamaki.

=== 2018–2020: Ila Kol Elli Bihebbouni and Sahbit Raey ===
On 11 July 2018, Elissa released the first lead single titled "Ila Kol Elli Bihebbouni" from her eleventh studio album of the same name. On 16 July 2018, Elissa released a promotional single from the album entitled "Krahni", produced by her brother Camil Khoury. Khoury additionally produced the songs "Maridit Ehtimam" and "Enta W Maii" on the album. Ila Kol Elli Bihebbouni was released on 25 July 2018. The album also includes a cover of Warda's song "Wahashtouni".

On 7 August 2018, Elissa released the music video for "Ila Kol Elli Bihebbouni" where in the music video, Elissa disclosed her breast cancer diagnosis in late December 2017 along with her treatment and recovery. The music video went viral and amassed more than 9 million views during its first week of release.

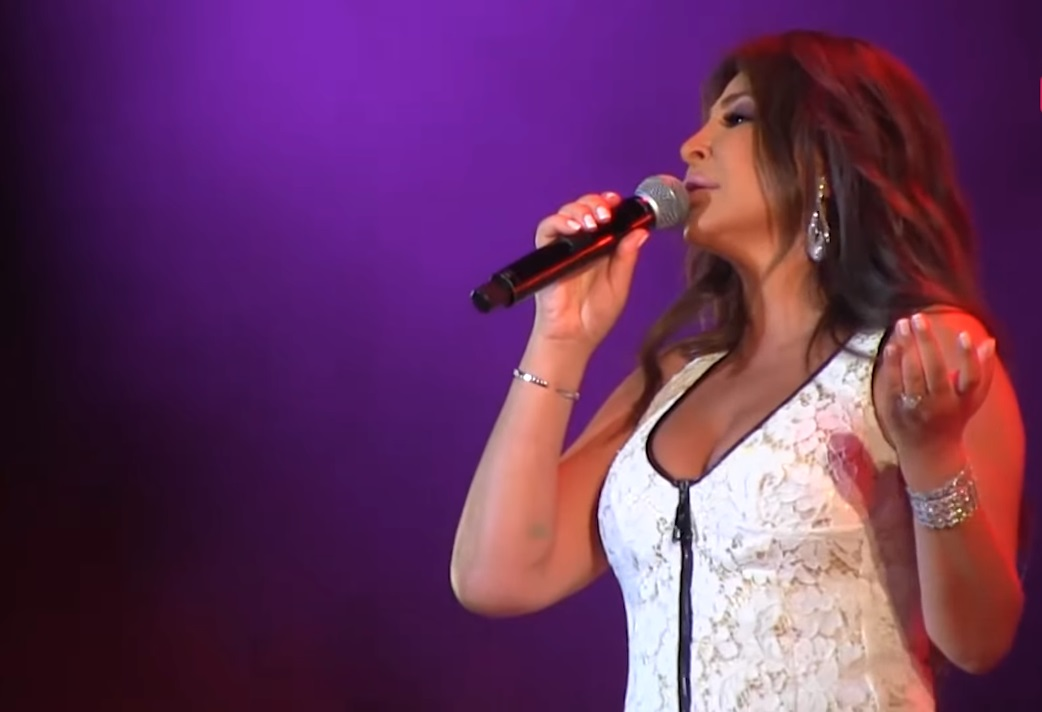
Elissa performing at Mawazine, June 2019

On 10 August 2018, Elissa gave a concert as part of Beirut Holidays Festival 2018; among the attendees was Armenian entertainer Lubluba. She also gave a concert in Tunisia. In September 2018, the Lebanese Information Minister honoured Elissa for her career. In October 2018, Elissa hinted at possible problems with label Rotana due to their exclusive deal with the Paris-based music streaming service Deezer, prompting the immediate removal of her entire discography from online digital services such as Anghami, Spotify and iTunes along with various Rotana-signed artists. On 22 April 2019 she released the music video for her song "Krahni".

In November 2018, Elissa announced on Twitter that she had begun work on her upcoming twelfth studio album. On 18 January 2019, Elissa performed a benefit concert in Egypt. In July, she announced a partnership with makeup artist Bassam Fattouh, releasing an eyeshadow palette titled 'The Star'. On 22 July, a promotional song for Telecom Egypt's 'WE' mobile service titled "Abl Ay Had" was released and as of August 2019, gained over 15 million views on YouTube.

On 18 August 2019, she initially announced her retirement from the music industry via Twitter, stating her then-upcoming twelfth studio album would be her last and describing the music industry field as "similar to the mafias." The news of her retirement shocked fans and fellow artists as the hashtag #كلنااليسا (English: "We are all Elissa") began to trend on Twitter, being offered support for the singer by fans and artists alike. Later, it was revealed that she had retracted her intention to retire and considered negotiations with Rotana.

On 18 July 2020, Elissa announced her twelfth studio album Sahbit Raey and released the lead single of the same name on 23 July. The album was followed by two singles titled "Hanghani Kaman Wi Kaman" and "Ahwet El Madi", which were released on 11 April and 25 May respectively and were later included in the track listing. The music video for "Hanghani Kaman Wi Kaman" was inspired by COVID-19 lockdowns, featured fellow Lebanese singer Haifa Wehbe, included fan-submitted videos filmed at home, and had its production budget donated to charity. An initial cover for the album/single with suggestive themes had caused controversy among audiences and had prompted Elissa's management to have it replaced with a different cover. The album was released exclusively on Deezer and Rotana's official YouTube channel during the Eid al-Adha season on 1 August. The album's final song features a French-language cover of "Mourir sur scène" by Egyptian-born Italian-French artist Dalida. The album was her last to be released by Rotana; departing the label after 16 years.

=== 2022–present: E-Records, Ana Sekketen and Elissar ===
In 2022, Elissa's Rotana-owned catalogue was reinstated on digital streaming platforms, such as Anghami, after a four-year absence. On 4 May of that year, she released a duet with Saad Lamjarred titled "Min Awel Dekika." The song became a significant success and as of January 2025, its music video amassed over 500 million views on YouTube; making it Elissa's most viewed video on the platform. She then released the single "Zahra Men El Yasmin" on 12 July. Later that year she established her own record label titled "E-Records" and began work on her thirteenth studio album. The first release under the label was the song "Ana W Bass" on 16 August 2022 and was purported to be the lead single from her then-upcoming album.

On 7 May 2024, she announced and released her thirteenth studio album Ana Sekketen.

On 27 October 2026, Elissa teased her fourteenth studio album, Elissar, which was released on 5 November. The self-produced 14-track record includes nine Egyptian songs, four Lebanese songs, and her first Khaleeji (Gulf Arabic) release, titled "Cheta El Riyadh". In an Instagram post, she explained that she named the album after her birth name because she felt it represented her identity and personal story.

== Other ventures ==
=== Advocacy ===
An advocate for breast cancer awareness, Elissa revealed her previously private diagnosis and defeat of an early stage of the disease with the release of her music video for "Ila Kol Elli Bihebbouni"; previously keeping it a secret from both the press and general public from her diagnosis in late 2017. The video ended with the following message: "I've recovered, I've beaten the illness and I won... Early detection of breast cancer can save your life... Don't ignore it, face it... Do it not only for yourself, but for your loved ones." Many applauded her for "breaking the taboo" of breast cancer awareness in the Middle East and therefore influenced and encouraged women to be checked for the disease. The hashtags #Elissa (اليسا#) and #To_All_Who_Love_Me (الى_كل_اللي_بيحبوني#) began to trend in Lebanon and surrounding countries in the Middle East. In October 2018, Elissa was chosen as an ambassador for a breast cancer awareness campaign in Beirut.

=== Political views ===
==== Domestic ====
Elissa is a supporter of the Lebanese Forces party and its leader, Samir Geagea, backing him for the presidency before the election of Michel Aoun.

Elissa had expressed support for the March 14 Alliance and opposition to the Syrian military presence in Lebanon. In 2018, she marked the anniversary of the Cedar Revolution by recalling her participation in the 2005 protests and stating that she remained committed to Lebanon's independence and freedom. In October 2019, Elissa joined the anti-government protests in Beirut, expressing support for demonstrators and criticising Lebanon's political leadership and living conditions. In June 2021, she criticised Lebanese President Michel Aoun and politician Gebran Bassil in a tweet, accusing them of contributing to Lebanon's crisis.

In May 2022, during an interview with MTV Lebanon, Elissa said that Israel was her enemy but argued that Hezbollah and Lebanese authorities had caused greater harm to Lebanon, criticising the influence of armed groups in the country. In October 2024, Elissa called for the Lebanese Army to assume control over Beirut's southern suburbs and other areas of Lebanon, arguing that the country should be protected by the state rather than armed groups or militias, in reference to Hezbollah.

==== Regional ====
Syria

In 2014, Elissa took to social media to condemn the actions of the ISIS against minorities, stating "I'm Lebanese and I'm proudly Christian, shame on such people."

During the Syrian civil war, Elissa expressed concern for Syrian civilians affected by the conflict. In 2017, she called for an end to the war and urged her followers to pray for the Syrian people, describing the deaths of civilians as tragic.

In December 2024, Elissa revealed that a relative, Claude Lichaa Al Khoury, was among those released from Saydnaya Prison after decades of detention under the Assad regime.

On 29 October 2026, following the murder of Maronite Catholic priest Samir Daou in Lebanon, Elissa posted on X stating that "speeding up the return of the displaced Syrians to their country has become an absolute necessity" and criticising state authorities for negligence in protecting citizens.

Palestine

In March 2019, Elissa stated that "the land of Palestine is slowly slipping away as we stand watching", prompting a response from Israel Defense Forces spokesperson Avichay Adraee, who blamed Hamas for the violence. Elissa replied by blocking his account and describing him as an "insolent occupier". In October 2023, she expressed her solidarity with Palestinian civilians in the Gaza Strip during the Gaza war by posting a tweet featuring a Palestinian flag with a quote that says "if you cannot lift the injustice, at least tell everyone about it." In 2024, she wore the Palestinian keffiyeh and the Palestinian flag during two massively successful concerts in Malmo and Stockholm in Sweden and spoke against Israeli crimes in Gaza before a crowd of 30,000 people.

=== Public statements ===
In 2021, Elissa appeared on a podcast on Anghami, where she discussed LGBTQ rights, women's rights, mental health, and other contemporary issues. She stated that homosexuality was "not a crime", opposed its criminalisation, and affirmed that everyone has the right to live as they choose.

== Discography ==
=== Studio albums ===
- Baddy Doub (1998)
- W'akherta Maak (2000)
- Ayshalak (2002)
- Ahla Dounya (2004)
- Bastanak (2006)
- Ayami Bik (2007)
- Tesada'a Bemeen (2009)
- Asaad Wahda (2012)
- Halet Hob (2014)
- Saharna Ya Leil (2016)
- Ila Kol Elli Bihebbouni (2018)
- Sahbit Raey (2020)
- Ana Sekketen (2024)
- Elissar (2026)

=== Compilations ===
- Best of Elissa (2011)

=== EPs ===
- Aghani Min Hayati (Live) (2021)

=== Singles and charted songs ===
Title	Year	Peak chart positions				Album
Title	Year	LBN	EGY	MENA	KSA	Album
"Garrabt Fe Marra"	2012	—	*	*	*	Non-album single
"Asaad Wahda"	2012	1	*	*	*	Asaad Wahda
"Law"	2014	1	*	*	*	Non-album single
"Ya Merayti"	2014	12	*	*	*	Halet Hob
"Mawtini"	2015	4	*	*	*	Non-album single
"Ya Rait"	2016	6	*	*	*	Saharna Ya Leil
"Saharna Ya Leil"	2016	1	*	*	*	Saharna Ya Leil
"Anti L Tohro Ya Mariam"	2017	—	*	*	*	Non-album singles
"Zakaria"	2017	—	*	*	*	Non-album singles
"Isht Wa Shoft"	2018	—	*	*	*	Non-album singles
"Krahni"	2018	19	*	*	*	Ila Kol Elli Bihebbouni
"Ila Kol Elli Bihebbouni"	2018	12	*	*	*	Ila Kol Elli Bihebbouni
"Bokra Bteshroq Shams El Eid"	2018	—	*	*	*	Non-album singles
"Abl Ay Had"	2019	—	*	*	*	Non-album singles
"Aam Thour"	2019	—	*	*	*	Non-album singles
"Ya Am Salamtak"	2021	19	*	*	*	Non-album singles
"Damayer"	2022	—	*	*	*	Non-album singles
"Min Awel Dekika" (with Saad Lamjarred)	2022	7	*	16	*	Non-album singles
"Zahra Men El Yasmin"	2022	—	*	—	*	Non-album singles
"Ana W Bass"	2022	16	*	—	*	Non-album singles
"Ma Tendam 3a Shi"	2023	12	*	—	*	Non-album singles
"Batmayel Aala El Beat"	2023	1	*	—	*	Ana Sekketen
"El Okd"	2023	12	*	—	*	Ana Sekketen
"Kello Waham"	2024	3	—	—	—	Ana Sekketen
"Hazzi Dehekli"	2024	14	—	—	—	Ana Sekketen
"Ana Mish Soutak"	2024	9	—	—	—	Non-album singles
"Kermalak"	2024	—	—	—	—	Non-album singles
"Hobbak Metl Beirut"	2024	6	—	—	—	Non-album singles
"We Takabel Habib"	2025	10	—	—	—	Non-album singles
"Habbatal Aheb"	2026	—	11	17	—	Elissar
"Baddi Yak"	2026	—	—	14	—	Elissar
"Kashf El Hisab"	2026	—	10	13	—	Elissar
"Ma Tlaenash"	2026	—	9	9	16	Elissar
"—" denotes items which were not released in that country or failed to chart. "*" denotes the chart did not exist at that time.

=== Collaborations ===
- Betghib Betrouh (with Ragheb Alama) [2000]
- Lebanese Night (feat. Chris de Burgh) [2002]
- Kount Fi Sirtak (feat. Cheb Mami) [2006]
- Jouwa El Roh (feat. Fadel Chaker) [2009]
- Wara El-Shababik (feat. Tamer Hosny) [2017]
- Efrah (feat. Tamer Hosny) [2022]
- Min Awel Dekika (feat. Saad Lamjarred) [2022]

== Filmography ==
- It's OK - a Netflix original documentary film about the singer's life (2024)

== Awards and nominations ==
Award	Year	Category	Nominated work	Result	Ref.
Joy Awards	2025	Best Female Artist	Herself	Nominated	
Billboard Arabia Music Awards	2024	Lifetime Achievement Award	Herself	Won	
Billboard Arabia Music Awards	2024	Best Female Artist	Ana Sekketen	Nominated	
Billboard Arabia Music Awards	2024	Best Levantine Female Artist	Ana Sekketen	Nominated	
Joy Awards	2023	Best Female Artist	Herself	Nominated	
Joy Awards	2023	Song of the Year	"Men Awel Dekika"	Nominated	
Big Apple Music Awards	2022	Best Arab Female Artist	Herself	Nominated	
Big Apple Music Awards	2022	Best Collaboration	"Men Awel Dekika"	Nominated	
Oscar Sayidaty Awards	2021	Best Arab Female Artist	Herself	Won	
Oscar Sayidaty Awards	2020	Best Arab Female Artist	Herself	Won	
Oscar Sayidaty Awards	2018	Social Media Award	Herself	Won	
Oscar Sayidaty Awards	2018	Best Music Video	"Ila Kol Elli Bihebbouni"	Won	
Middle East Music Awards	2018	Song of the Year	"Nefsi Aollo"	Won	
Arab Nation Music Awards	2018	Best Music Video	"Aaks Elli Shayfenha"	Won	
Middle East Music Awards	2017	Song of the Year	"Maktooba Leek"	Won	
Arab Nation Music Awards	2017	Best Arab Artist	Saharna Ya Leil	Won	
Arab Nation Music Awards	2017	Best Lebanese Artist	Saharna Ya Leil	Won	
Arab Nation Music Awards	2017	Best Song Written For Visual Media	"Ya Rait"	Won	
Arab Nation Music Awards	2017	Social Media Award	Herself	Won	
Oscar Sayidaty Awards	2017	Best Music Video	"Aaks Elli Shayfenha"	Won	
Murex d’Or	2015	Song of the Year	”Law”	Won	
Zahrat Al Khaleej Awards	2014	Best Arab Female Artist	Halet Hob	Won	
World Music Awards	2014	Best Selling Middle Eastern Artist	Asaad Wahda	Nominated	
Murex d’Or	2013	Song of the Year	”Asaad Wahda”	Won	
Murex d’Or	2013	Best Lebanese Female Artist	Asaad Wahda	Won	
Beirut International Awards Festival	2013	Best Arab Female Artist	Asaad Wahda	Won	
Middle East Music Awards	2011	Best Arab Female Artist	Tesada'a Bemeen	Won	
World Music Awards	2010	Best Selling Middle Eastern Artist	Tesada'a Bemeen	Won	
Jordan Awards	2010	Best Arab Female Artist	Tesada'a Bemeen	Won	
Murex d'Or	2010	Best Lebanese Female Artist	Tesada'a Bemeen	Won	
Big Apple Music Awards	2010	Best Arab Female Artist	Tesada'a Bemeen	Won	
Murex d'Or	2008	Song of the Year	"Betmoun"	Won	
Murex d'Or	2008	Best Music Video	"Betmoun"	Won	
Middle East Music Awards	2008	Best Arab Female Artist	Ayami Bik	Won	
MTV Europe Music Awards	2007	Best Arabian Act	Herself	Nominated	
World Music Awards	2006	Best Selling Middle Eastern Artist	Bastanak	Won	
World Music Awards	2005	Best Selling Middle Eastern Artist	Ahla Dounya	Won	
Murex d'Or	2005	Best Lebanese Female Artist	Ahla Dounya	Won	
Murex d'Or	2005	Best Music Video	"Hobak Wajaa (Inta Lameen)"	Won	
Al-Ahram Music Awards	2004	Best Arab Female Artist	Ahla Dounya	Won	
Oscar Sayidaty Awards	2003	Best Music Video	"Ajmal Ihssas"	Won	
Murex d'Or	2002	Best Arab Female Artist	Ayshalak	Won	
Dubai Music Week	2002	Best Music Video	"Ajmal Ihssas"	Won	
Studio El Fan	1992	Best Female Singer	Herself	Silver	
