= Murex d'Or =

Lebanese award given for artistic achievements

The Murex d'Or (also known as the Golden Murex Award) is a Lebanese arts award established in 2000. It was founded by Lebanese physicians Zahi and Fadi Helou to honor achievements in theatre, film, and music in Lebanon, the Arab region, and internationally. The first Murex d'Or ceremony was held on 4 June 2000. The award’s name pays tribute to the Phoenician Murex sea snail, historically used in the production of imperial Tyrian purple.

== Awards by year and category ==
- 2000: The first Murex d'Or ceremony took place on June 4, 2000 under the patronage of minister Suleiman Trabulsy at the Regency Palace Hotel's Caesar's Palace theater in Adma.
- 2001: The 2001 Murex d'Or event took place on June 2, 2001 under the patronage of Information minister Ghazi Aridi at the Caesar's Palace theater in Adma.
- 2002: The event took place on September 14, 2002 under the patronage of the First Lady Andrée Lahoud also at the Caesar's Palace theater in Adma.
- 2003: The fourth installment of the awards was held on November 29, 2003 at the Casino du Liban's Salle des Ambassadeurs.
- 2004: This ceremony took place on January 29, 2005 under the patronage of President Emile Lahoud at the Caesar's Palace theater in Adma.
- 2005: This installment was held on January 28, 2006 at the Casino du Liban's Salle des Ambassadeurs.
- 2006: The seventh Murex d'Or ceremony took place in the Salle des Ambassadeurs on May 5, 2007.
- 2007: The event was held also at the Salle des Ambassadeurs on June 20, 2008.
- 2008: The event was held at the same place on June 19, 2009.
- 2009: The event was held at the "Eddé Sands Resort" in Byblos on June 10, 2010 and screened live on MTV Lebanon.
  - Gaby Lteif received a Golden Murex for his entire career.
- 2010: The Golden Murex were organized at the Edde Sands Resort in Byblos on 10 June 2010 and broadcast live on MTV Lebanon.
- 2011: The Golden Murex took place on June 23, 2011.
  - Best Arabic Actress: Sulafa Memar
  - Best Arabic actor: Kosai Khauli
- 2012: The ceremony took place on June 11, 2012 and was broadcast on MTV Lebanon.
  - Best Lebanese artist: Nawal Al Zoghbi.
  - Best Arabic Actress: Poussi
  - Best Arabic actor: Maxim Khalil
  - The best Lebanese song: "Ya Leil Ana Bhebbal" (Sarah El Hani), "Ya Lalali" (Nadine Saab), "Akher Hammak" (Sabine), "Ya Kell El Deni" (Joseph Attieh), "W Taamar Lebnan" (Hicham El Hajj)
  - Best lyrics and music: Joseph and Michel Geha
  - Best play: "Che Guevara" by Farid and Maher Al Sabbagh
  - Best Arabic song: "Eed Habaybak" (Saber Rebaï), "Maarafch Leih" (Nawal Al Zoghbi), "Men Ouyouni" (Myriam Fares), "Al Ghira" (Naya), "Byehssedouni" (George Wassouf)
  - Best Arabic Artist: Saber Rebaï
  - Best star: Myriam Fares
  - Best screenplay: Claudia Marchelian
  - Best artist: Ziad Bourji
  - Best Lebanese film: Where Do We Go Now?
  - Best film music: Khaled Mouzannar
  - Best Lebanese actress: Nadine Nassib Njeim
  - Best Arabic Actress: Hend Sabry
  - Best Lebanese series: "Al Chahroura"
  - Best Actress: Carole Samaha
  - Best Arabic Singer: Assi El Helani
  - Best Arabic Singer: Sherine
  - Best Model: Mona Ghoss
  - Best actress in a secondary role: Joelle Dagher
  - Best actor in a secondary role: Majdi Machmouchi
  - Best Song: "Majnoun" by Ramy Ayach
  - Best music: Mike Massy
  - Best album: "Kol D'i'a Chakhssiye" by Wael Jassar
  - Best young actress: Dorra Zarrouk
  - Best young talent: Sabine
  - Best young talent: Anwar Nour
  - Best Lebanese director: Samir Habchi
  - Best young singer: Naji El Osta
  - Best young actress: Dalida Khalil
  - Best Video: Angie Jamal
  - Best Lebanese actor: Youssef El Khal
  - Best young talent of the Gulf: Mansour Zayed
- 2013: The ceremony took place on June 24, 2013 and was broadcast on MTV Lebanon.
  - Singer Khaled received a Golden Murex.
- 2014: The Golden Murex of 2014 took place at the Casino of Lebanon on Thursday, September 3, 2014. Winners included Nancy Ajram, Duraid Lahham and Elsy Firnayni.
- 2015: The Golden Murex took place at the Casino du Liban in Jounieh, Lebanon.
  - Singer Saad Lamjarred won a golden Murex for his hit song "Enty".
  - Aline Lahoud: Best Singer and Actress Award for her role in the play (Bent Al Jabal)
- 2016: Les Murex d'or took place on May 28, 2016 and was broadcast on LBC and Future TV.
  - Singer Hatim Idar received the Murex d'or award in the best Arab artist category.
  - Singer Sheila received an Achievement Award for her Achievement Award.
- 2017: The Golden Murex took place on May 12, 2017 and was broadcast on MTV.
  - Singer Karim Nour received the Best Song for his song "Ad el-Sama bhebek" and the Prize of the general public.
  - Singer Saad Lamjarred received the Best Song Award for his song "Ghaltana" and the Prize of the general public.
- 2023: The ceremony was held on 17th of September at the Casino du Liban. Myriam Fares received an award as "the first Lebanese and Arab star to reach the international stage", and Şevval Sam received an award as the "Outstanding Turkish Actress".
- 2024: Winners included Ahlam, Balqees Fathi and Nadine Njeim.
- 2025: Winners included Taim Hasan, Amina Khalil, Nicole Saba, Amal Maher, Maged El Masry, Nawal El Zoghbi, Nabila Ebeid and Tamer Ashour.
