= Ayza Aeesh =

Studio album by Samira Said
- Released: November 5, 2015
- Genres: Pop, synthpop, jazz, dance-pop
- Length: 51:42
- Language: Arabic
- Label: Rotana Records
- Producers: Bilal Sroor, Mahmood El Osaili, Sherif Quta, Waleed Saad, Nader Abdullah, Ehab Abdulwahed, Mohammed Aram, Sherif Ismail Hussain, Mohammed Reheem

Samira Said chronology
Ayaam Hayati (2008)	Ayza Aeesh (2015)

Singles from Ayza Aeesh
- 1. "Ayza Aish" Released: 2 November 2015; 2. "Mahslsh Haga" Released: 5 May 2016

Ayza Aeesh (Arabic: عايزة أعيش, English: I Want to Live) is the 43rd studio album by Moroccan recording artist Samira Said. The album was released by Rotana Records on November 5, 2015. Ayza Aeesh marks Said's first album in over seven years since Ayaam Hayati (2008) was released in summer 2008. Ayza Aeesh is also Said's first collaboration with Arab World's largest music label Rotana Records, owned by Prince Al-Waleed bin Talal after her departure from her previous record label Alam El Phan.

During the first week of its availability, the album was predicted to have sold over 200,000 copies according to Laha Magazine. Upon its release, Ayza Aeesh received critical acclaim by multiple artists in the Arabic music industry which includes producers, writers, actors, and musicians. Assala Nasri, Sherine, Fifi Abdou, Carole Samaha, and Mohammed Assaf are examples of artists who expressed their positive opinions towards the album through electronic press and their profiles in social media. "Ayza Aish", a song produced and written by Egyptian musician Mahmood El Osaili, was released to radio as the lead single on November 2, 2015. "Mahslsh Haga" and its accompanying music video were released as the second single from the album on May 5, 2016.

== Background ==
Said released her 42nd studio album Ayaam Hayati in July 2008. The album received critical and commercial acclaim despite poor promo by Alam El Phan. The album only produced one single, "Hob Mayous Menoh", which was also shot as a music video with Said's long-time collaborator Hadi El Bajori. Said left Alam El Phan in 2009 after over 10 years in the company. Having no label, Said decided to go independent. She also built her own recording studio in Egypt and started recording new music.

Since 2011, many countries in the Arab World have been suffering from violence, political conflicts, and even civil war as a result of the Arab Spring protests in 2011. This led to Said continuously delaying the release of a new album for over seven years. Said, however, released multiple singles prior to the release of Ayza Aeesh, last of which was a song in Moroccan dialect entitled "Mazal" (2013) and another song in Khaliji dialect entitled "Mazloom" (2015).

"Mazal" music video, which received over five million views on YouTube, was directed by El Bajori. The song also won a World Music Award for best single. While "Mazal" was released independently, "Mazloom" was released under Rotana's label after Said signed her contract with the company in late 2014.

During the recording of the album, Said lost her mother to cancer in April, 2014, which further delayed the album release. Said finally submitted the master copy of Ayza Aeesh to Rotana in August 2015. Release dates were rumored to be in late July and mid September to coincide with Muslim holidays of Eid al-Fitr or Eid al-Adha, respectively. Those plans were scrapped due to reasons such as 2015 Mina disaster and Said putting final touches on the tracks.

== Composition ==
The album incorporates multiple pop genres and styles. Some of the tracks on the album such as "Mahslsh Haga" and "Ensana Masoola" use storytelling and monologue in their lyrics, which is uncommon in Arabic Music. The promo single "Ayza Aish" is inspired by house music, a genre that found its way to mainstream Arabic music in the mid-2000s when Egyptian pop artists like Amr Diab used it in their music. In "Ayza Aish", Said expresses her boredom and desire to leave her sorrow behind and live her life to the fullest. The album also incorporates multiple jazz styles in number of occasions such as the ballad "Hob", which was used in the album's first sneak peek commercial. "Ensana Masoola", on the other hand, incorporates more uplifting jazz beats. In "Ensana Masoola", Said expresses her anger at her lover who does not trust her and watches her every move.

Although the album draws heavy influences of Western pop music in most of the tracks, Said still maintained her usual Middle Eastern sounds. This is done by number of techniques including Said's vocal performance. The song "Ya Latif" for instance is an electronic pop song with synthesized tabla beats. The song "Garalk Eh" is a cover of David Guetta and Sia's "She Wolf (Falling to Pieces)" with slightly different arrangements and Arabic lyrics.

== Singles ==
"Ayza Aish" was released as radio-only single just before the album release in November. On May 5, 2016, Anghami, an Arabic music streaming service, released the music video for the song "Mahslsh Haga" which was shot in Serbia in March. The video was directed Angy Jammal, which is her first collaboration with Said. The video shows Said acting in a play about a celebrity struggling in her divorce hearing but trying to live a normal life after the separation.

== Promotion ==
The album was made available for digital download through iTunes, Amazon.com, and Google Play during the first hours of November 5. The physical release followed the same week; However, the company responsible for printing and distrusting the album did not provide the record stores with promotional posters. To make up for the delay, each copy of Ayza Aeesh was sold with a free poster on the day of release.

In addition to the twelve tracks that appear on the album, Mobinil, one of Egypt's largest mobile phone providers, sponsored the release of two additional tracks through Rotana's YouTube channel. Those tracks are "Ya Aam Eash" and "Youm Men Omrena". The latter is a cover of Whitney Houston's 1999 hit single "Heartbreak Hotel" with updated arrangements and Arabic lyrics. Rotana also uploaded the whole album to its YouTube channel in the popular lyric video format.

== Reception ==
The album received positive feedback both commercially and critically. When the album was offered digitally for pre-order, it charted at number-one on Egypt's iTunes album chart. The album debuted at number two on Virgin Megastore album charts on November 18, 2015, behind Angham's album Ahlam Barya which was released two weeks prior to Ayza Aeesh. On November 22, the album climbed to number-one ahead of Angham's and Rami Sabry's albums, respectively. Ayza Aeesh sold over 200,000 copies during the first day of its availability.

== Track listing ==
No.	Title	Writer(s)	Producer(s)	Length
1.	"Hawa Hawa"	Shadi Noor	Bilal Sroor	4:15
2.	"Ayza Aish"	Mahmood El Osaili	El Osaili	4:35
3.	"Ensana Masoola"	Nasr El Din Naji	Sherif Quta	4:25
4.	"Madmansh Nafsy"	Nader Abdullah	Waleed Saad	3:42
5.	"Mahslsh Haga"	Noor	Sroor	3:39
6.	"Ahtamal Wared"	Abdullah	Abdullah	4:22
7.	"Ya Latif"	Noor	Sroor	4:11
8.	"Mandish Waat"	Ayman Ezz	Ehab Abdulwahed	4:10
9.	"Garalk Eh"	Ashraf Ameen	Mohammed Aram	4:28
10.	"Aywa Atghyrt"	Essam Hosni	Sherif Ismail Hussain	5:12
11.	"Awat Keteer"	Bahaa El Din Mohammed	El Osaili	4:39
12.	"Hob"	Mohammed Reheem	Reheem	4:35
Total length:				51:42

== Personnel ==
Personnel credits adapted from the album's booklet.

- Samira Said – vocals, backing vocals
- Sherif Amar - photography, concept, and design
- Hani Yacub, musical arrangements (tracks 1, 5, and 7)
- Ali Fathullah, musical arrangements (track 2)
- Ahmed Ragab, musical arrangements (track 3)
- Tariq Abduljaber, musical arrangements (tracks 4 and 6)
- Nader Hamdi, musical arrangements (track 8)
- Mohammed Aram, musical arrangements (track 9)
- Mohammed Mostafa, musical arrangements (track 10)
- Ameer Hedaya, musical arrangements (track 11)
- Meeno, musical arrangements (track 12)

== Release history ==
Region	Date	Label	Format
Arab World	November 5, 2015	Rotana Records	Digital Download
