= Dan Haddad =

Lebanese music video director (born 1994)

- دان حداد
- Born: 1994 (age 31–32); Lebanon
- Occupation: Film director

Dan Haddad (Arabic: دان حداد; born 28 November 1994) is a Lebanese music video director, filmmaker, and media artist active in the Middle East. His work includes collaborations with Arab singers, including Wael Kfoury, Saif Nabeel, Balqees, Shams, and Saad Lamjarred. Haddad's collaboration with Balqees, Entaha won the award for Best Music Video at the Hollywood Music in Media Awards in 2021.

== Career ==
Haddad started experimenting with music and video production at the age of 16. He graduated from the Lebanese University with a degree in production design.

He started his career as a production designer for music videos and local TV shows. His directing breakthrough came with his debut music video Schizophrenia for Kuweiti singer Shams (singer). The music video garnered multiple nominations and awards. He went on to direct videos for artists such as Wael Kfoury, Saif Nabeel, Balqees, Saad Lamjarred, and Ziad Burji.

His commercial clients include Samsung, and MAC Cosmetics, that featured Lebanese actress and singer Cyrine Abdelnour, and actress and former Miss Lebanon Nadine Njeim, respectively.

== Recognition and awards ==
Haddad's directing style is described as distinctive, and is widely recognized by critics. In 2021, Balqees’ song Entaha won the award for the best video at the Hollywood Music In Media Awards. In 2021 he won a New York Cinematography Award for Shams's Schizophrenia music video. His 2021 collaboration on Momken _a hit song by duo Saif Nabeel and Balqees_ was highly acclaimed; the video hit record YouTube views shortly after its release.
