= Kolma N'arrab =

Kolma N'arrab (Whenever We Come Closer)

Studio album by Angham
- Released: 10 June 2007 (Egypt)
- Recorded: 2005–2007
- Genre: Reggaeton, Arabic pop, soul, jazz, blues, Arabic classics
- Length: 39:01 minutes
- Label: Rotana
- Producer: Rotana (Producer), Bassam Aawwad (Executive producer)

Angham chronology
Bahibbik Wahashteeny (2005)	Kolma N'arrab (Whenever We Come Closer) (2007)

Professional ratings
Review scores
Source	Rating
Ahram Newspaper	4.5/5 stars
14 October	5/5 stars
The Mayo News	5/5 stars
Masrawy	5/5 stars
Wlad elBalad	5/5 stars

Kolma N'arrab (Whenever We Come Closer) is the eighteenth full-length Arabic studio album from Egyptian pop singer Angham. The album was released on 10 June 2007 in Egypt, on 15 June 2007 in Middle East, and 3 July 2007 worldwide. On the first day of its release, the album's tracks were available to buy from iTunes. The album features what Angham describes as "an image of who she actually is, without retouch or fakeness, exposing to her audience her raw personality." The album has been both a critical and commercial success, after a commercially failed previous album despite its creativity, and has so far sold in excess between 850 000 and 980 000 copies in the Middle East. Some sources revealed that Rotana, Mazzika and Dream channels confirmed that the record of Kolma Nearrab is 800 000 CD, placing the record in a second position among the best-selling records released in 2007 in Middle East. Moreover, elBayan newspaper stipulated that the record sold half a million CD since 18 August 2007 and the number of sales is still escalating. Broadcast intensively one week prior to the album's release in the market, its first single "Kolma N'arrab" was filmed as a music video by director Ahmad elMahdy in Egypt and was ranked, upon its arrival to Rotana's Top 20 chart, at rank eleven before it moved to rank one after seven consecutive weeks. Rotana's spokesperson, Tony Semaan, assured the record has now a platinum certification.

== Album information ==
The Album was recorded at Angham's private studio in alShourouk (Egypt) near her house to prevent any leakage of songs and news to the media and press. Angham changed the style of music she adopted in her previous records by picking up a vivid style of music, influenced heavily by reggaeton beats and jazz. She described this record as her first step to introduce her songs to the young demographic which she has failed from to reach for the most part. Contrary to her preceding records, "Omry Maak" (My Life with you) in 2003 and "Bahibbik Wahashteeny" (I Love you and Miss you) in 2005, her husband, music arranger Fahd, limited his contributions to the arrangements of the tracks. He worked on four songs only, after heavy criticism of her ability to release a record without his help. The record's tracks were recorded by M. Nash'at Naser elDeen and Mohammad Saker while the mixing was done by Khaled Ra'ouf and Amro Hashem. M. Mahmoud Ezzat and Khaled Raouf supervised the recording of Angham's voice. Mohammad Sakker worked on the digital mastering of the entire record. Angham's surprise in this record is her remake of the famous pop folk song "Ashky Lmeen" (Whom Shall I Complain To) of veteran artist, Mohammad Mounir. She explained this step as wanting to pay tribute to Mounir's musical accomplishments since his career's debut till now. The CD cover, showing an inspired Angham looking to the sky, was photographed by Karine and Charbel in collaboration with Karim Noor. The vintage design of cover's layout was done by Khaled Rushdy in her second collaboration with him, (the first the being "Wahadaniya" (Lonely) in 1999). Angham's current production company and distributor, Rotana, released the record three weeks earlier than its original release date. This was a decision made so that the album wouldn't be in competition with Lebanese singer Najwa Karam's new album Hayda Haki (That's What I'm Talking About). Angham dedicated this record mostly to her fans, and to the young music composers who presented her in a new and rejuvenated form.

== Promotion ==
The failure of Angham's previous record, Bahibbik Wahashteeny (I Love You, I Miss You) (2005), had been partly attributed to inadequate promotional tours and the quasi-absent of many important public appearance. During 2005, Angham has been pregnant. She added on Maa Hobbi (With Love) talk show (Rotana Channel) that "I could have chosen the choice of not releasing the 2005 record and content instead with spending quality time with my family. But, I chose not to do that." "Kolma N'arrab" has been Angham's best-received album in years. Critics tend to agree that her 2005 record was generally uninspired, and have hailed "Kolma N'arrab" as a return to form. Whereas the campaign for her previous studio album concentrated on her maternal stress and alleged marital divorce, the marketing for "Kolma N'arrab" attempted to arouse curiosity about the rumor of Angham being accused of filming "Kolma N'arrab" in alSahadar mosque in the ancient section of Cairo in Egypt. The rumor, spread around the Middle East countries, caused a riot in the Parliament of Egypt, and a possible ban for Angham to enter Kuwait. However, the rumor's folder ended firmly only few days before the broadcasting of the music video on Rotana channel when Angham appeared on "elYom elSabee" (On The Seventh Day) talk show to publicly denounce the rumor with factual documentation of what happened exactly during the filming days. For the first time, Angham started to pre-promote for her record before its release. She sang "Atmannalo elKheir" (I Wish Him All The Best) unplugged on Cairo Today show hosted by Omar Adeeb and on Hala Febrayer concert 2007. She also sang exclusively a short part of "Mabahebbesh" track on "Khaleek belBeit" (Stay Home) talk show on Future channel and "elYom elSabee" (On The Seventh Day) hosted by Mahmoud Saad. Angham's "Kolma N'arrab" concert tour around the Middle East officially started on 14 July 2007. She kicked off the tour at "Layali elTelevision" (Television Nights) concert which took part in the Chinese Garden in Cairo. It was performed and broadcast Live on both Egyptian Channel 1 and Egyptian Satellite channel at the same time. Critics confirmed that the concert was successful, and noticed a new way of thinking from Angham, as she was aiming at gathering the young demographic into her fans' record. Despite the small space, 3600 spectators came to the concert, most of them aged between seventeen and twenty-six years old. Angham then performed at Studio 2M, an international show at Casablanca in Morocco, which is loyally watched in France. She sang "Kolma N'arrab", "Atmannalo elKheir" (I'll Wish Him All The Luck) and her hit "Sidi Wisalak" (Your Charm). She also performed at "Nejm elNoujoum" (Star of Stars) musical talent search show in Kuweit, where she left the press perplexed and curious about the reason why she cried during her performance of "Inta Meen" (Who Are You) from her 2005 record. Angham also was the guest of Maa Hobby's closure of the first season, a gift from Rotana to show an admiration to the effort Angham did in making her latest record successful and popular. On 22 August, Angham performed a private and grand concert at Semiramis, a five-stars hotel in Cairo. This is the first time in her singing career that Angham takes on a step like this.

== Music video ==
So far, the album spawned only one single released one week before the album release. "Kolma N'arrab" was released on 5 June 2007, to critical acclaim and a successful run on the majority of Arabic charts. It was broadcast in Canada and United States of America on 14 July 2007. The music video for "Kolma N'arrab" was artfully directed by veteran director Ahmed El Mahdi. The storyline revolves around a single woman, portrayed by Angham, living in an urban setting. She is in love with a man, whom she saw as she is entering her apartment building, at first sight. She finally takes the plunge at a party and dances with him, bringing the lyrics "closer" to life. According to Angham's official website Angham's Official Website, Angham will shoot "Dah Elly Indi" (That's All I Got in Store For You) or "Ma Bataallemsh" (I'll Never Learn) next and release the chosen song as the second single of the album. According to Aaram newspaper, it is confirmed she will film her second single under the direction of Ahmad elMahdy. Angham settled down for the shooting of "Ma Bataallemsh" as her second music video, according to Elaph E-newspaper.

== Track listing ==
1. "Kolma N'arrab" (Whenever We Come Closer) [4:54 min] (Lyrics by: Baha' elDeen Mohammad | Music composed by: Khaled Ezz | Music arrangements by: Fahd)
2. "Ma Bataallemsh" (I'll Never Learn) [5:00 min] (Lyrics by: Amir T'eaima | Music composed by: Khaled Ezz | Music arrangements by: Tarek Madkour)
3. "Atmannalo elKheir" (I'll Wish Him All The Luck) [4:44 min] (Lyrics by: Amir T'eaima | Music composed by: Khaled Ezz | Music arrangements by: Walid Kayem)
4. "elAmal" (The Hope) [3:54 min] (Lyrics by: Mustafa Mursi | Music composed by: Khaled Ezz | Music arrangements by: Ashraf Mahrous)
5. "Bagheer" (I Get Jealous) [4:26 min] (Lyrics by: Nader Abdullah | Music composed by: Tamer Ali | Music arrangements by: Tameem)
6. "Dah Elly Indi" (That's All I Got In Store For You) [3:44 min] (Lyrics by: Amir T'eaima | Music composed by: Ramy Gamal | Music arrangements by: Fahd)
7. "Ma Bahebbesh" (I Don't Like) [4:01 min] (Lyrics by: Ayman Bahgat Amar | Music composed by: Khaled Ezz | Music arrangements by: Issam Shrayti)
8. "Ghayarteni" (You Changed Me) [4:32 min] (Lyrics by: Hend elKadi | Music composed by: Khaled Ezz | Music arrangements by: Fahd)
9. "Ashky Lmeen?" (Whom Shall I Complain To?) [4:54 min] (Lyrics by: Abdul Raheem Mansour | Music composed by: Baleegh Hamdy | Music arrangements by: Fahd)
10. "elHourouf" (Those Letters) [4:36 min] (Lyrics by: Mohammad Refa'i | Music composed by: Sherif Tagg | Music arrangements by: Tarek Madkour)
