= List of The Official MENA Chart number ones of the 2020s =

The Official MENA Chart is a record chart that ranks the most streamed song in the Middle East and North Africa. Data is compiled by the Spanish BMAT Music Company and is published every Tuesday.

== Number ones ==
No.	Artist	Title	Issue date	Wks. at number one	Ref.
2022
1	Rema	"Calm Down"	29 November 2022	8	
2023
2	Miley Cyrus	"Flowers"	24 January 2023	3	
re	Rema	"Calm Down"	14 February 2023	2	
3	Ahmed Saad	"Ader Akmel"	28 February 2023	3	
re	Rema	"Calm Down"	21 March 2023	1	
4	Jimin	"Like Crazy"	28 February 2023	1	
re	Rema	"Calm Down"	4 April 2023	3	
5	Ramy Sabry	"Ymken Kher"	25 April 2023	3	
6	Mahmoud Al-Turky	"Asheq Majnoon"	16 May 2023	9	
7	Nawal	"Mekhsmak"	18 July 2023	1	
8	Jungkook featuring Latto	"Seven"	25 July 2023	2	
re	Nawal	"Mekhsmak"	8 August 2023	7	
9	Majid Al Mohandis	"Janant Galbi"	26 September 2023	1	
re	Nawal	"Mekhsmak"	3 October 2023	1	
10	Jungkook featuring Jack Harlow	"3D"	10 October 2023	2	
11	TalkinToys	"Bleeding"	24 October 2023	3	
12	Jungkook	"Standing Next to You"	14 November 2023	2	
re	Majid Al Mohandis	"Janant Galbi"	28 November 2023	1	
13	Sherine	"Kalam Eneih"	5 December 2023	1	
14	Ayed	"RDY"	12 December 2023	3	
2024
15	Fouad Abdulwahed	"Kel Ahebek"	2 January 2024	3	
16	Tamer Ashour	"Haygeley Mwgoa3"	23 January 2024	9	
17	V	"Fri(end)s"	26 March 2024	1	
18	Future, Metro Boomin and Kendrick Lamar	"Like That"	2 April 2024	2	
re	Tamer Ashour	"Haygeley Mwgoa3"	16 April 2024	4	
19	Ramy Gamal	"Beykalemony"	14 May 2024	1	
20	Kendrick Lamar	"Not Like Us"	21 May 2024	2	
21	Sabrina Carpenter	"Espresso"	4 June 2024	1	
22	Eminem	"Houdini"	11 June 2024	1	
re	Sabrina Carpenter	"Espresso"	18 June 2024	3	
23	Assala	"Yamorr W Ma Yesalem"	8 July 2024	1	
re	Kendrick Lamar	"Not Like Us"	15 July 2024	2	
24	Jimin	"Who"	29 July 2024	1	
25	Ayed	"Lammah"	5 August 2024	12	
26	Rosé and Bruno Mars	"Apt."	28 October 2024	3	
27	Hamza Al Muhmdawi	"Awl Mara"	29 November 2024	4	
re	Rosé and Bruno Mars	"Apt."	17 December 2024	1	
re	Hamza Al Muhmdawi	"Awl Mara"	24 December 2024	3	
2025
28	Lady Gaga and Bruno Mars	"Die with a Smile"	14 January 2025	7	
re	Kendrick Lamar	"Not Like Us"	4 March 2025	1	
re	Lady Gaga and Bruno Mars	"Die with a Smile"	11 March 2025	5	
29	Ayed	"Takhayal Law"	15 April 2025	2	
re	Lady Gaga and Bruno Mars	"Die with a Smile"	29 April 2025	1	
30	Fadel Chaker	"Ahla Rasma"	6 May 2025	7	
