= Fulla (disambiguation) =

Fulla is an ásynja in Norse mythology.

Fulla may also refer to:

- Fulla (doll), a Middle-Eastern fashion doll

== People with the name ==
- Fulla Al Jazairia or Fella El Djazairia (born 1961), Algerian singer
- Ľudovít Fulla (1902–1980), Slovak painter
