= Habeat =

Studio album by Sherine
- Released: 2009
- Genres: Arab pop, World music
- Length: 42:46
- Language: Arabic
- Label: Rotana

Sherine chronology
Batamenak (2008)	Habeat (2009)	Esaal Alaya (2012)

Habeat (Arabic: حبيت, English: I Fell in Love) is a 2009 album by Sherine.

== Track listing ==
No.	Title	Writer(s)	Composer	Length
1.	"Akheran Etgarat" (Egyptian Dialect)	Nader Abdullah	Waleed Saad	4:09
2.	"Katar Khayre" (Egyptian Dialect)			4:09
3.	"Inkatably Omr" (Egyptian Dialect)			3:56
4.	"Habeat" (Egyptian Dialect)			4:19
5.	"Khaletny Akhaf" (Egyptian Dialect)			4:08
6.	"Gool La Mita" (Egyptian Dialect)			3:34
7.	"Mafeesh Manee" (Egyptian Dialect)			4:51
8.	"Mabalash" (Egyptian Dialect)			4:06
9.	"Ma Tehasebneesh" (Egyptian Dialect)			4:53
10.	"Fakirne Eyh" (Egyptian Dialect)			4:41
