= The Official MENA Chart =

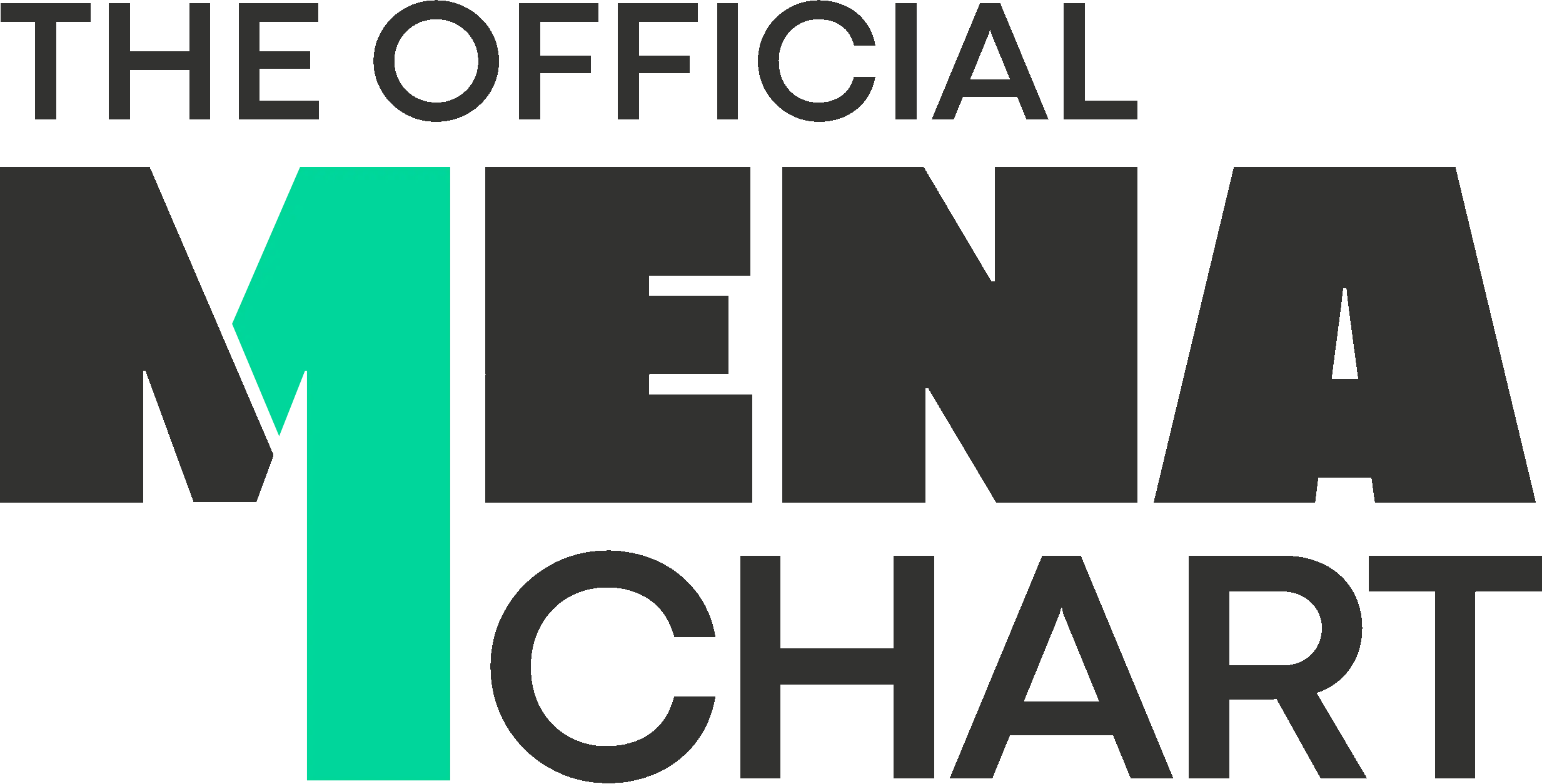
- Website type: Record chart
- Available in: Arabic; English; French
- Owner: International Federation of the Phonographic Industry (IFPI)
- Website: www.theofficialmenachart.com
- Launched: November 29, 2022; 3 years ago
- Current status: Active

The Official MENA Chart (Arabic: قائمة أفضل أغاني مينا الرسمية, romanized: Qāʾimat Afḍal Aghānī Mīnā r-Rasmiyya) is an International Federation of the Phonographic Industry (IFPI) sanctioned music chart covering Middle Eastern and Northern Africa (MENA) countries.

== Background ==
The chart was announced by IFPI on November 29, 2022. It includes data from 13 countries: Algeria, Bahrain, Egypt, Iraq, Jordan, Kuwait, Lebanon, Morocco, Oman, Qatar, Saudi Arabia, Tunisia, and the United Arab Emirates. The data is collected by the Spanish BMAT Music Company and is released every Tuesday. Four more charts were launched in October 2023, tracking the national song performance in Saudi Arabia, the United Arab Emirates and Egypt. A second regional chart was introduced for North Africa.

== Charts ==
- Middle East and North Africa: 2020s
- United Arab Emirates: 2020s
- North Africa
- Egypt: 2020s

=== Saudi Arabia ===
No.	Artist(s)	Title	Issue date	Wks. at number one
2023
1	Majid Al Mohandis	"Janant Galbi"	26 September 2023	1
2	Rashed Al-Majed	"Ya Mohammad"	3 October 2023	1
re	Majid Al Mohandis	"Janant Galbi"	10 October 2023	1
3	Ayed	"Kareh Nafsi"	17 October 2023	1
4	TalkInToys	"Bleeding"	24 October 2023	4
re	Ayed	"Kareh Nafsi"	21 November 2023	1
re	Majid Al Mohandis	"Janant Galbi"	28 November 2023	2
5	Ayed	"RDY"	5 December 2023	3
6	Fouad Abdulwahed	"Kel Ahebek"	2 January 2024	4
2024
7	Tamer Ashour	"Haygeley Mwgoa3"	30 January 2024	8
8	V	"Fri(end)s"	26 March 2024	1
re	Tamer Ashour	"Haygeley Mwgoa3"	9 April 2024	5
9	Ramy Gamal	"Beykalemony"	7 May 2024	4
re	Tamer Ashour	"Haygeley Mwgoa3"	4 June 2024	5
10	Assala	"Yamorr W Ma Yesalem"	9 July 2024	4
11	Ayed	"Lammah"	6 August 2024	16
12	Hamza Al Muhmdawi	"Awl Mara"	26 November 2024	9
2025
re	Ayed	"Lammah"	28 January 2025	2
13	Ayed	"Aijrah"	11 February 2025	1
re	Ayed	"Lammah"	18 February 2025	2
14	Kendrick Lamar	"Not Like Us"	4 March 2025	2
15	Lady Gaga and Bruno Mars	"Die With a Smile"	19 March 2025	1
