= Esaal Alaya =

Studio album by Sherine
- Released: January 23, 2012
- Genre: World music, Arabic pop
- Length: 44:33
- Label: Rotana Records

Sherine chronology
Habeat (2009)	Esaal Alaya (2012)	Ana Kiteer (2014)

Esaal Alaya (Arabic: اسأل عليا) is a studio album by Egyptian musician Sherine. The album contains 11 tracks, released on January 23, 2012, to wide commercial and critical success.

== Track listing ==
1. We El Nabi Law Gane
2. Nafse Afham Leh
3. Hatrooh
4. Aasabo Talaga
5. Wahda Be Wahda
6. Masaola Menak
7. Law Lesa Baaee
8. Da Mesh Habibi
9. Esaal Alaya
10. Bethke Fe Eih
11. Nafse Afham Leh Music

== Chart performance ==
Esaal Alaya debuted atop the Virgin Megastores physical sales chart in more than nine Arab regions, including Egypt, where it occupied the apex for 15 consecutive weeks and became one of the best-selling albums of 2012.
