= Batamenak =

EP by Sherine
- Released: June 17, 2008
- Genre: Arabic pop, World
- Length: 25:41
- Language: Arabic
- Label: Rotana Records

Sherine chronology
Lazem Ayesh (2005)	Batamenak (2008)	Habeat (2009)

Batamenak (Arabic: بطمنك) is an extended play released by Egyptian singer and actress Sherine. Batamenak was released by the Saudi Arabian studio recording company Rotana Records in 2008.

== Track listing ==
1. Batamenak
2. Bekelma menak
3. Ana Mosh Bitat El Kalam Da (Remix)
4. Mesh Ayiza Gheirak Enta
5. Barag'a Nafsy
6. Mesh Ayiza Gheirak Enta (Remix)

== Reception ==
According to Rateyourmusic.com, Batamenak was listed as 19 out of the 30 best Arabic Albums of the year 2008.
