= Iraqis in Saudi Arabia =

Total population
- 60,000

Regions with significant populations
- Riyadh, Jeddah, Rafha

Languages
- Mesopotamian Arabic, Kurdish (Feyli and Kurmanji dialects)

Religion
- Islam (Sunni) &(Shia)

The population of Iraqis in Saudi Arabia includes Saudi Arabian citizens of Iraqi ancestry as well as Iraqi citizen expatriates living in Saudi Arabia. According to the UNHCR, as of 2007, about 17,000 Arab Shia Iraqis who fled to Saudi Arabia during the Iran–Iraq War lived in the country with de facto refugee status; another 33,000 Iraqis fled to Saudi Arabia from U.S.-led attacks, of whom about 5,200 remained in the camp at Rafha.

== Notable people ==
- Abdul Rahman Munif, novelist.

( Born in Saudi Arabia - Saudi Father/Iraqi Mother - Has Saudi Arabian Citizenship )

- Waed, musician and entertainer

( Born in Saudi Arabia - Saudi Father/Iraqi Mother - Has Saudi Arabian Citizenship )

== See also ==
- Iraq–Saudi Arabia relations
- Iraqi diaspora
- Immigration to Saudi Arabia
