= Namir (singer) =

Iraqi singer, composer and songwriter (born 1988)

- Birth name: Namir Abd
- Born: January 20, 1988 (age 37)
- Origin: Baghdad, Iraq
- Occupation(s): Musician, composer, singer, songwriter
- Years active: 2009–present
- Labels: Music Box; Al-Nazaer; Stallions; Music Master; Relax-In; Rotana Platinum Records (mbc), Star Casablanca and Music Alramas

Namir (Arabic: نمير; born January 20, 1988) is an Iraqi singer, composer and songwriter.

== Discography ==
=== Studio albums ===
- 2011: ma beladna
- 2015: moh aroh
- 2016: la elia
- 2016: kader'
- 2017: malak
- 2017: rawini
- 2017: kli aelak

=== Live albums ===
- 2017: la elia
- 2017: kli aelak
