= Bahibbik Wahashteeny =

Bahibbik Wahashteeny (I Love You, I Miss You)

Studio album by Angham
- Released: 25 July 2005 (Egypt)
- Recorded: 2003–2005
- Genre: Arabic pop, R&B, jazz
- Length: 57:44 minutes
- Label: Rotana
- Producer: Rotana (Producer), Bassam Aawwad (Executive producer)

Angham chronology
Omry Maak (2003)	Bahibbik Wahashteeny (I Love You, I Miss You) (2005)	Kolma N'arrab (2007)

Singles from Bahibbik Wahashteeny
- 1. "Mitel elAwal (released on Internet)"; 2. "Aziz w Ghali (not in the record)" 3. "elAmaken (tribute to Mohammad Abdo)"

Bahibbik Wahashteeny (I Love You, I Miss You) is the seventeenth full-length Arabic studio album from Egyptian pop singer Angham, launched in Egypt on 25 July 2005 (see 2005 in music) by Rotana Production Company. It was her second record on the label after "Bet'heb Meen" (Who Do You Love) which was released in 1997. The 2005 record has witnessed a critical success but commercial disappointment. "Bahibbik Wahashteeny" is perhaps the least sold record during Angham's entire singing career in the last 10 years, but improved its sale gradually upon the broadcast of its second single "Bahib Nafsi" (I Love Myself). However, despite the promotion and Angham's 2005 tour, the record had only a moderate success and Angham was unable to garner any hits from the album except "Albak" (Your Heart) and "Inta Meen" (Who Are You) which both caused a tremendous success around the Middle East and the Gulf countries, respectively. The record is available on both CD (57:44 minutes) and tape (50:38 minutes) format. The bonus track "Inta Meen" (Who Are You) and the remix of "Bahibbik Wahashteeny" are only featured on the CD version. In this record, Angham collaborated with many new faces. They include Hend elKady who worked with Angham for the first time as a music composer; her brother Khaled Suleiman and Ismael as new music arrangers; Ameer Teaima, Sultan Salah, Wissam Sabry, Khaled Abou elFateh and Fahd Thamal as the new lyricists.

== Album information ==
Professional ratings
Review scores
Source	Rating
L7en E-Newspaper	link
Egypty.com	link
Masrawy E-newspaper	link
Oghnia Review	(3.2/5) link

According to Angham, Bahibbik Wahashteeny is considered as the closest record to her heart because the lyrics summarized her attitude toward her life, her experiences and the way she perceives the people around her. She referred to "Bahibbik Wahashteeny" in Maa Hobbi televised interview on Rotana channel as one of her closest albums, because it was the first to really begin to express her personality freely. This record was born in a period where Angham is trying to balance between her new life as wife and mother on one hand, and a new version of her as a rejuvenated artist on the other. The record was recorded at Sawt elMouseeka (Voice of Music) studio by a team composed by M. Nash'at Naser elDeen, Mohammad Saker, Khaled Raouuf, and Mohammad Ismaeel. The mixage was done by M. Nash'at Naser elDeen. Nunutrack took part in the digital mastering of the record. The promotional pictures were all done by MKI. The front CD cover created an aura of mystery around the record when it was promoted, because it partly hid Angham's face and raised curiosity. The press criticized Angham for not adding enough pictures to her CD booklet, a gesture that forced Angham to add more pictures to her next 2007 record's booklet. The track "Bahibbik Wahashteeny" was written by a fan whose name is Khaled Abou elFateh, who sent it to her through her mail box. Angham recalled how she phoned him to his house at 2 o'clock in the morning to announce him that she picked his lyrics to sing it for her new record. Angham liked the track so much lot that she did not hesitate putting it as the title of her 2007 record. On the same note, Angham released "Mitel elAwal" (Similar to the First) on the Internet, a Lebanese song that was due to be officially inserted in the record, but was deleted before printing. Angham explained the reason behind this decision by saying she was not fully ready to sing in the Lebanese dialect yet. Angham co-produced "Inta Meen" (Who Are You) with Rotana. She flew to Istanbul to record and rearrange the track with music arrangist, Ismael.

== Promotion ==
Angham herself said she was not satisfied with the promotion of the new record. Two days after the album release, and hearing about the mediocre sales of her record, Angham decided to stage a concert in Tunisia alongside Ramy Ayach, and specifically at Carthage International Festival, to promote the record. The public exceeded 14000 in number, but Angham's performance, which continued very late at night forced many to leave the concert an hour before its official closure. The press reviews were not good toward this concert. It stated that the Tunisian's public demographic are tending toward the quick pop songs and that they came for Ramy Ayach and not Angham. Angham made less guest appearances on television show but the main one was "Moubashar" (LIVE) with host Mahmoud Saad. She also was guest at Saaet Samaa (An Hour of Hearing) on Noujoum FM radio. Moreover, she appeared on November at "elBeit Beitak" (This Home is Your Home) television show in a step to try to air her music video "Bahibbik Wahashteeny" outside Rotana's channels to give Egypt's the chance to watch it since having Rotana requires a satellite connection. Angham also appeared sometimes on Rotana News to give information about her latest record's update. The record's timing came in a year where the Egyptian music industries and editorial press are starting to harshly accuse Rotana for ruining the Egyptian artists' careers on the expense of the Gulf and Lebanese ones. Angham also performed at Star Academy 4 where she sang "Sidi Wisalak" (Your Charm), "Bahibbik Wahashteeny", and "Baheb Nafsi".

== Music videos ==
Angham's first single music video from "Bahibbik Wahashteeny" record is the title song itself. It was directed by Hady elBajoury. The director was searching for something simple for this particular music video, content only to show Angham in daily life activities in her true face and colours. The filming took part in alGouna, a tourist site in the south of Egypt. In this music video, Angham is considered the first Arabic female artist to appear in her seventh-month pregnant state. She herself wanted a music video that does not exhaust her too much, but yet remain creative, warm and friendly to the lyric of the song. Fahd created a shorter version of the song for the music video where he have cut short the instrumental music as it shows between the 3:10 and 3:35 minutes sequences. Angham won "best presence and allure" and "best camera expression" for this music video, according to Rotana Top 20. The next single, "Bahib Nafsi", broadcast in May, was filmed with the same director in Lebanon. It tackles a very simple scenario, featuring Angham wandering with a car driver through the streets of Lebanon to arrive at a private little concert. She wore her hair very short to make the public think of her hit song "Sidi Wisalak" (Your Charm) from her 2001 record. The second music video was a favor. It helped boost the record's sale, however, in a moderate way.

== Controversies ==
Years 2004–2005 were full of rumors and conflicts which reflected negatively on "Bahibbik Wahashteeny" record sales. Angham joined Rotana production company on 14 March 2004, after seven years of the contract's expiration following the release of "Bet'heb Meen" in 1999. Because of a busy schedule trying to cope with a new marriage to her second husband, Fahd, and a lawsuit launched against her by Mohsen Gaber, her ex-company's president, which ended when Angham paid the sum of the production fees for her third year contract, Angham found it hard to concentrate on "Bahibbik Wahashteeny". New problems emerged as well. A new rumor tried to falsely confirm that Angham and Fahd's marital life is at stake based on untrue reports that Fahd was caught cheating with actress Mirna elMohandess, in Beirut (Lebanon), during the filming of her new movie. It grew more intensified when Angham took time to respond to the matter before she finally denied it in Kalam elNass magazine after many weeks. The press also mentioned a previous rumor that Fahd has a secret relationship with international Lebanese artist, Elissa, in Lebanon. They described how Angham stormed back to Beirut angrily and took him back to Egypt. Elissa's website denied this rumour quickly. After the release of "Bahibbik Wahashteeny" music video, Angham gave birth to Abdel Rahman, her second son to join the family. Prior to the birth's due time, Angham was hospitalized for a minor kidney stone, and was forced to temporarily postpone the recording of the record. Because of her condition, Angham refused at the last minute to accept to star in a new movie called "Aan elAshk Wel Hawa" (About Love and Passion) alongside Mona Zaki and Ahmad Sakka. There were already plans for this film in 2005. On the second note, the Middle East press used "Bahibbik Wahashteeny"'s commercial failure to justify a rumour that Angham is very angry toward Rotana when the company refused to allow a big budget for her next music video with Nadine Labaki, topped with a negligection of her record's promotion. Angham stepped up in many newspapers and magazines to deny this statement. The weakness of Angham's record contributed also in rising the competition among the new Egyptian female singers who are willing, at any price, to take her position. Among them is pop star, Sherine Ahmad, who commented on Laha magazine (edition 217) that "Angham is jealous of my record "Lazem Aeeych" and if her record wasn't this weak, she wouldn't go and say stuff like "no comparison between me and Sherine" or "that Sherine is a folklore singer" [...]" This statement was published after Angham's interview in the same magazine (edition 268) in which she said that she hates the press constantly talking and comparing between her and Sherine. Today, Angham closed the matter. On the other hand, Sherine continues releasing negative comments against Angham.

== Track listing ==
The tracks below are in the order according to the CD version. The tape version does not involve track 6 and 12.

1. Fakrak (I Remember You) [5:01 min] (Lyrics by: Nader Abdallah | Music composed by: Tamer Ali | Music arrangements by: Fahd)
2. Bahib Nafsi (I Love Myself) [4:40 min] (Lyrics by: Wissam Sabri | Music composed by: Tamer Ali | Music arrangements by: Fahd)
3. Meen Gheirak (Who Else Than You) [4:53 min] (Lyrics by: Khaled Mounir | Music composed by: Sheriff Tagg | Music arrangements by: Fahd)
4. Tetgahayar (It Changes) [4:08 min] (Lyrics by: Hend elKady | Music composed by: Khaled Ezz | Music arrangements by: Fahd)
5. Ad Me Teadar (As Much As You Can) [4:25 min] (Lyrics by: Nader Abdullah | Music composed by: Tamer Ali | Music arrangements by: Khaled Suleiman)
6. Inta Meen [bonus track] (Who Are You) [7:06 min] (Lyrics by: Fahd Thammal | Music composed by: elFaissal | Music arrangements by: Ismael)
7. Ool Kida (Say It) [3:39 min] (Lyrics by: Ezzat elGindy| Music composed by: Sherif Tagg | Music arrangements by: Fahd)
8. Astanna Eih (What Should I Wait For) [6:54 min] (Lyrics by: Ameer Teaima | Music composed by: Khaled Ezz | Music arrangements by: Fahd)
9. Ana Belnesbalak Eih (What Do I Mean To You) [2:31 min] (Lyrics by: Sultan Salah | Music composed by: Khaled Ezz | Music arrangements by: Fahd)
10. Bahibbik Wahashteeny (I Love You, I Miss You) [4:27 min] (Lyrics by: Khaled Abou elFatah | Music composed by: Sherif Tagg | Music arrangements by: Tarek Madkour)
11. Albak (Your Heart) [7:40 min] (Lyrics by: Hend elKady | Music composed by: Khaled Ezz | Music arrangements by: Fahd)
12. Bahibbik Wahashteeny [remix] (I Love You, I Miss You) [4:20 min] (Lyrics by: Khaled Abou elFatah | Music composed by: Khaled Ezz | Music arrangements by: Fahd)

== Charts ==
"Bahibbik Wahashteeny" music video peaked on Pepsi Rotana TOP 20 at rank 10 on 11 October 2005.

"Bahib Nafsi" music video peaked on Pepsi Rotana TOP 20 at rank 7 on 29 May 2006.

"Bahib Nafsi" music video peaked on Variety Nile channel in Egypt at rank 1 on 6 August 2006.

"Bahib Nafsi" track peaked on Sawt elGhad (Voice of Tomorrow) radio in Lebanon at rank 4 on 3 November 2006.
