= Saif Nabeel =

Iraqi singer and composer (born 1986)

Saif Nabeel سيف نبيل
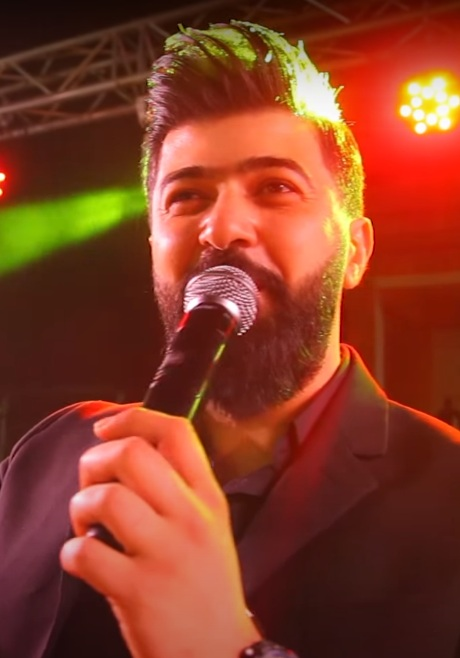
- Saif Nabeel singing at the graduation ceremony, College of Medicine, University of Al-Qadisiyah on 1 April 2018.

Background information
- Born: 4 March 1986 (age 40); Baghdad, Iraq
- Genres: Classical crossover; pop; world; hip-hop
- Occupations: Musician; composer; singer
- Years active: 2011–present
- Labels: Al-haneen Productions; Music Al Remas TV

Saif Nabeel (Note: Arabic: سيف نبيل) (born 4 March 1986) is an Iraqi singer and composer.

== Discography ==
Nabeel began his career as a rapper before shifting his style to Arabic pop music, working with Nesrat Albader and Alremas.

=== Songs ===
- 2011: "Hay Essanah"
- 2011: "La Latsadeq"
- 2012: "Theej Al Sanah"
- 2013: "Etha Haseet Beya"
- 2014: "Beddam3ah Ella Shawyah"
- 2015: "Qabel Youmeen"
- 2015: "Ma Mertah"
- 2016: "Ma Yeswoon"
- 2016: "Ma Be3et Denyay" (featuring Noor AlZeen)
- 2016: "Yalla Weinah"
- 2017: "Khayef Men Endy" (featuring Noor AlZeen)
- 2017: "Ahebbak"
- 2017: "La Teroh"
- 2017: "Shakhbarak"
- 2017: "Bestah Ani"
- 2017: "Abe Ashoof" (featuring Esraa Alaseel)
- 2017: "Eddagah Maqsodah"
- 2017: "Ghalay Enta"
- 2018: "Ya Denya Henنهه"
- 2018: "Men Tegheeb"
- 2018: "Brohak Shareek"
- 2018: "3esheq Moot"
- 2018: "Dayekh Beek"
- 2019: "Qalb Thany"
- 2019: "Bas Taal"
- 2019: "Akher Kalam" (featuring Shamma Hamdan)
- 2019: "Kol Youm Elak Ashtaq"
- 2020: "Elak"
- 2020: "Foq Al Qemmah"
- 2020: "Ma Dareet"
- 2020: "Loo" (in Arabic: لو)
- 2021: "Momkin" (featuring Balqees)
- 2025: "Allo Allo" (featuring Hind Ziadi)

== See also ==
- List of best-selling music artists
