= Ana Kiteer =

Studio album by Sherine
- Released: January 15, 2014
- Recorded: Nogoum Records in Cairo, Egypt
- Studio: Building 3K, Egyptian Media Production City (EMPC) Al-Wahat Road, 6 October, Cairo, Egypt
- Genre: Arabic pop
- Length: 50:29
- Language: Arabic
- Label: Nogoum Records

Sherine chronology
Esaal Alaya (2012)	Ana Kiteer (2014)	Taree'i (2015)

Ana Kiteer (Arabic: أنا كتير) is the seventh studio album released by Egyptian singer Sherine. It was released by the recording company Nogoum Records in 2014. To many, this album has much meaning in the world. Even to Mrs. Abdel Wahab herself. Her song "Shokran Ya Shahm" (Thank you gentlemen) talks about how her husband cheated on her.

== Track List ==
1. We Meen Ekhtar
2. Da El Saytara
3. Metakhda Men El Ayam
4. Ya Layali
5. Shokran Ya Shahm
6. Kayneen
7. Fe Leila
8. Mesh Khayfa
9. Ellet El-Nom
10. Tagroba Mo2lema
11. Koly Melkak
12. Ana Kiteer

== Nominations ==
- Nominated for the Best World Music Award at the World Music Awards in 2014.
