= Leih Sebtaha =

Leih Sebtaha (Why Did You Leave Her)

Studio album by Angham
- Released: 2001 (Egypt)
- Recorded: 1999–2001
- Genre: Arabic pop, Arabic classic, techno
- Label: Alam elPhan
- Producer: Alam elPhan (Producer), Mohsen Gaber, Ali elMaleegi, Bassam Awwad, Hassan elZakem (Executive producers)

Angham chronology
Wahdaniya (1999)	Leih Sebtaha (Why Did You Leave Her) (2001)	Omry Maak (2003)

Leih Sebtaha (Why Did You Leave Her) is the fifteenth full-length Arabic studio album from Egyptian pop singer Angham, launched in Egypt in 2001.

== Track listing ==
1. "Sidi Wisalak" (Your Charm) (Lyrics by: Ezzat elGendy | Music composed by: Sheriff Tagg | Music arrangements by: Tarek Akef)
2. "Leih Sebtaha" (Why Did You Leave Her) (Lyrics by: Baha' elDeen Mohammad | Music composed by: Sheriff Tagg | Music arrangements by: Tarek Madkour)
3. "Rahet Layali" (Nights Have Gone) (Lyrics by: Mohammad elRifai | Music composed by: Sheriff Tagg | Music arrangements by: Yahya elMougi)
4. "Magabsh Serty" (Did He Mention Me) (Lyrics by: Ayman Bahgat Amar | Music composed by: Riyad elHamshari | Music arrangements by: Tarek Akef)
5. "Leih Sebtaha (instrumental)" (Why Did You Leave Her) Lyrics by: Baha' elDeen Mohammad | Music composed by: Sheriff Tagg | Music arrangements by: Tarek Madkour)
6. "Tedhak Alaya" (You Laugh At Me) (Lyrics by: Saoud elSharabtli | Music composed by: elFaissal | Music arrangements by: Mahmoud Sadek)
7. "Noujoum elLeil" (Stars Of the Night) (Lyrics by: Wael Helal | Music composed by: Ameer Abdel Majeed | Music arrangements by: Ashraf Mahrous)
8. "Habbeitak Leih" (Why Did I Even Love You) (Lyrics by: Nader Abdallah | Music composed by: Sheriff Tagg | Music arrangements by: Ashraf Mahrous)
9. "Hayran" (Confused) (Lyrics by: Naser Rashwan | Music composed by: Ameer Abdel Majeed | Music arrangements by: Hisham Niyaz)
10. "Ana Indak" (I'm at Your Place) (Lyrics by: Bahaa elDeen Mohammad | Music composed by: Sheriff Tagg | Music arrangements by: Tarek Madkour)
