= Bassima =

Lebanese singer

- Born: Paula Al Turk; 1 July 1973 (age 53); Yahchouch, Lebanon
- Origin: Lebanon
- Genres: Arabic pop music, Music of Lebanon
- Occupation: Singer
- Instrument: Vocals
- Years active: 1998–2018
- Labels: Music Box Studio (1998–2001); Rotana (2001–present)

Bassima (Arabic: باسمة; born Paula Al Turk (Arabic: بولا الترك) on 1 July 1973) is a Lebanese singer also known as a Studio El Fan winner.

== Career ==
Bassima started her career in 1998 releasing singles "Washwashny Habibi Sammaani Kalam", and "Fi Orbak w Bo'dak Hayati Achanak". Later on, she has released six albums working with prominent composers in the region such as Marwan Khoury, Samir Sfeir, Tarek Madkour, Boudi Naoum, and others.

== Personal life ==
Bassima is married to Elie Jbeily. She has two children: Gaia and George.

== Discography ==
- Dawabni Dob (1999), Music Box Studio
- Andy So'al (2001), Rotana Records
- 3einy Ya Mo (2002), Rotana Records
- Shou Rajja'ak (2004), Rotana Records
- Shou 3a Bali (2005), Rotana Records
- Helm Toyour (2008), Rotana Records

== Releases ==
- Washwashny Habibi Sammaani Kalam (1998)
- Fi Orbak w Bo'dak Hayati Achanak (1998)
- Raje'ali al-Amal (2015)
- Jarhak 3endi (2016)
