= Angham =

Egyptian actress and singer (born 1972)

- أنغام
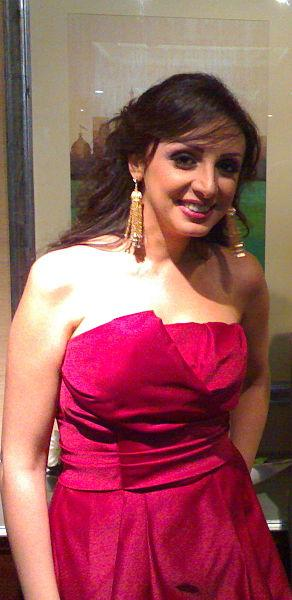
- Born: Angham Mohamed Ali Suleiman أنغام محمد على سليمان; 19 January 1972 (age 54); Alexandria, Egypt
- Occupations: Singer; songwriter; musician; actress
- Years active: 1987–present
- Spouses: Magdy Aref (m. 1994–2003) Fahd Al-Shalabi (m. 2004–2008) Ahmed Ezz (m. 2011–2012) Ahmed Ibrahim (m. 2019–2020)
- Children: 2
- Musical career
- Genres: Egyptian; Arabic pop; Arabic classical; Khaliji
- Instruments: Vocals; oud; piano
- Labels: Sono Cairo Audio & Video Co.; Alam El Phan; Rotana

Angham Mohamed Ali Suleiman (Arabic: أنغام محمد على سليمان [ʔænˈɣæːm mæˈħæm.mæd ˈʕæli seleˈmæːn]; born 19 January 1972), known by the mononym Angham (أنغام), is an Egyptian singer, recording artist, and actress. Her debut was in 1987 under the guidance of her father, Mohammad Suleiman. Following her divorce from Magdy Aref in 2000, Angham took much more control over her image and musical style after that Leih Sebtaha (Why Did You Leave Her) record established her into a strong position amid the constant emerge of new voices in the Middle East music scene. After a highly publicized feud with Alam El Phan Music Records' president Mohsen Gaber, she moved to another record company, Rotana.

In 2005, She released the album Bahibbik Wahashteeny (I Love You, I Miss You). It was critically acclaimed, but commercially was not as expected. After three years, Angham returned to the forefront of Arabic pop music in 2007 with her album Kolma N'arrab (Whenever We Come Closer) which sold more than 500,000 CDs across the Middle East in less than three months and was awarded a platinum certification.

== Early life ==
Angham was born in Alexandria, Egypt, the eldest child of Mohamed Suleiman, a former violinist, music composer, orchestra chief in the Egyptian opera house, and singer, while her mother, Mageda Abdel Haleem, an artist. She grew up in a Muslim family.

The family moved to Cairo by the late 1990s, and settled down at El Mohandiseen, an area known for being home to many celebrities. Angham has three siblings. Her brother, Khaled, studied music arrangements. While her brother Ahmad, owing to his physical handicap, remained away from the spotlight.

== Music career ==
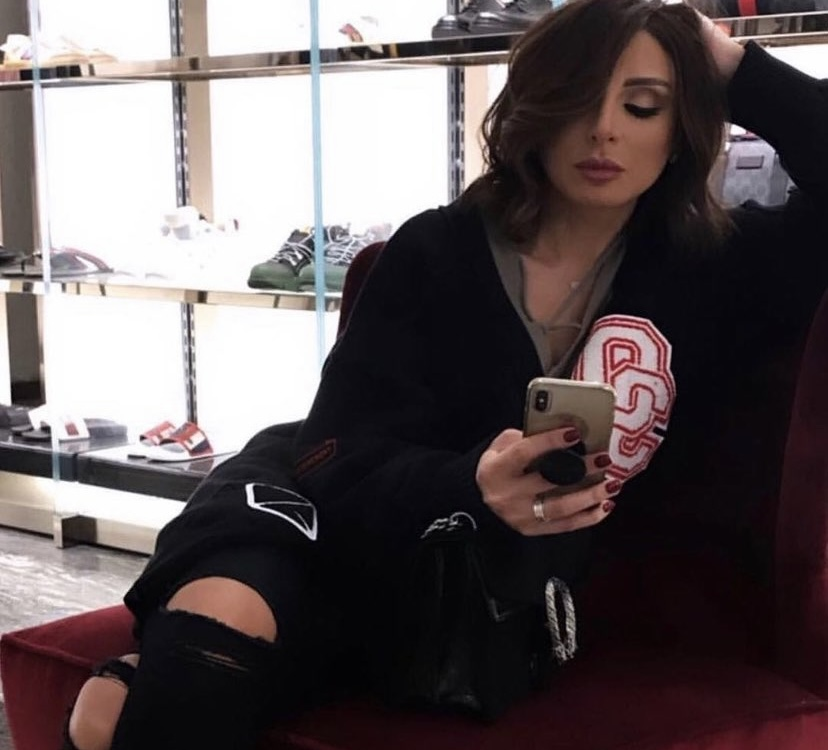
Angham in 2021

Angham began singing at around the age of sixteen, under the guidance of her uncle, Emad Abdel Haleem. Angham performed for the first time in public during Cairo's Radio syndicate ceremony. She sang "el Gannah Taht Akdamek" (Paradise Is Under Your Feet), a song dedicated to mothers. She recalled how her father was not pleased with her performance.

Upon finishing high school, Angham joined Cairo's Conservatory of Music. She studied the basics of the music, improved her voice's capacities, and learned how to play on the traditional piano and Oud. However, Angham fell into a nervous breakdown when she received news about her uncle's death which happened on the same day of her first tour in Tunisia at the Carthage International Festival.

=== 1987–1994: Debut with her father ===
Released in 1987, Fil Rokn elBaeed elHady (In The Far Distant Corner) is Angham's first breakaway record.

Her father introduced her to Sayed Naser, a businessman and record producer, who agreed on producing and financing her records and tracks. Angham was the first artist to join Sayed Naser Records company, and the youngest to be accepted. Due to her father's wide recognition in the music industry, famed composer Mohammed Abdel Wahab gave Angham the copyright of his track "Basbosa".

This record features a series of records that are mostly musically composed by Mohammad Suleiman. Angham's lyricist, Ezzat el Gendy, who was behind the success of "Sidi Wisalak" (Your Charm) in 2001, also saw his debut with Angham on the "La Yal Hob" (No Love) track. "Fil Rokn elBaeed el Hady" was a pivotal success.

The following year, Angham conceived Awal Gawab (The First Answer), her second record, as a homage to Egyptian soul music composer, Sayed Makkawy, and she worked with a variety of lyricists on the record. Sayed Makkawy gave her the copyrights of his song "Aalo Enseeh" ("They Said Forget Him") to add it to the record.

The Awal Gawab record was released soon after her debut record but was neither critically nor commercially as successful. "Awal Gawab" and "Hawa elMasayef" ("Summer Love") were her most successful tracks on this record. During 1988, although she occasionally performed live, stage fright prevented Angham from embarking on any major tours. Her first widely seen concert appearances were mainly at the Cairo Opera House, and she said she felt that her performance proved her vocal abilities were not, as some had previously speculated, simulated using studio techniques.

Four next records which were all produced by Sayed Naser Records except the last one which is produced by "Sawt elCahira" (Voice of Egypt) Records saw the light. They were a transitional phase of Angham in her adolescent years. Most of the tracks dealt with love, breakup, friendship, family and fun. These albums were titled as "LaLiLi Lali", "Layek", "Ettafakna" and "Bibassata Kida". The first two were released in the year 1989, the third in 1990 and the fourth in 1991. In 1992, she sang two songs composed by the Saudi composer, Mohammed Al-Senan, which are "Shayfak" (I See you) and "Ain El-Hawa" (The Eye of Love). The lyrics of both songs were written by Ezzat elGendy. They were produced by Alkhoyool in 1992, and they were reproduced by production label Rotana in 2002 among the famous collection musical record Mahrajan Nagham Watarab 2002 (Festival of Melodies and Oriental 2002). However, Angham's relationship with her father started to deteriorate when he discovered her intention of separating from him. He felt stress over the public's reprisal of his daughter's as a person and artist. Among the four records, it was the last one that had a phenomenal success. The latter featured the hit "Ya Tayeb" (Humble Person), which tackled the subject of humanity and stabilized Angham's position as a celebrity. In 1992, the feud between Angham and her father resulted in her working less with her father to conceive her seventh record, "Intal Alam" ("You Are The World") which was produced by "Sawt elCahira" ("Voice of Egypt") Records.

The 1993 record Ella Ana ("Except Me"), produced by Rocky Records, was the best record for Angham between 1987 and 1994. This fact was attributed to the critical and commercial success of such tracks as "Telephonak Kam" ("What's Your Number"), "Shantet Safar" ("Luggage") and "Ella Ana".

=== 1995–2000: Search for expansion ===
After her separation from her father, Angham collaborated with music composer, Ameer Abdel Mageed. He worked subsequently on "Baollak Eih" (Tell You What) record in 1995 and musically composed all its tracks. The record was produced by Laser Records owned by Mustafa Dagher.

The track "Tekdar Aal Meshwar" ("Up for the Journey") was sung in 7.6 octave voice with a rich oriental music background. "Law Hasseit" which was filmed as a music video is the first track to contain quick Latin/Spanish beats, and perhaps helped Angham gain more popular in the young demographic. The sound engineering was taken care by Ameen Akef, Hussein Aahdy, and Omro Hashem, while the record was co-produced by Angham and Adel Othman Helal.

In 1996, under Laser Records' production, Angham's tenth record Akdar ("I Can") saw the light. It was entirely composed by Ameer Abdel Mageed. The record was released in a second copy featuring the unreleased track "el Amar" ("The Moon"). Angham stepped up to show that she can make it without father's guidance. International composer, Abdo Dagher, also worked with Ameer Abdel Mageed in the construction of the tracks' melodies.

Angham started to experiment recording in the Lebanese dialect, but could not master it. However, she rehearsed for the Gulf dialect and released "Shay Daa" ("Something Got Lost") in 1996, which was her first Gulf record, produced by Founoun el Jazeera Records. It was an instant hit in the Persian Gulf region, and led to her performing in Qatar, Kuwait, and UAE, and other places.

Angham returned to the spotlight with a very successful record Betheb Meen ("Who Do You Love") in 1997 with Rotana, where she worked once again with her father, but on only two songs. Upon its release, Angham silenced all rumors about her relationship with father, indicating that even though they had separated on the professional level, the link of father and daughter remained intact.

Due to her first Gulf record's success, Angham embraced a second experience at the same level. "Khalli Bokra L'Bokra" (Keep Tomorrow For the Future) record released in 1998 and produced by Stars Records company was even more successful than the first one. The record contained hits like "Haybet Malek" ("Pride of a King"), "Ma Had Fady" ("No One Cares"), "Eedna Mbarak" ("Happy Anniversary"), and "Ghareeb" ("Strange"). In this record, the music of the tracks were mainly composed by Tarek Mohammad, Khaled elSheikh, and Talal Medah. "Ghareeb" track is only available in its complete version on the CD. The record Wahadaniya ("Lonely Woman"), released in 1999, produced by Sawt elCahira Records, which took back Angham under its wings after knowing her popularity grew more intense. All the tracks in this records were hits, but the most successful ones were "Bet'hebbaha Walla" ("Do You Love Her Or What"), "Baatly Nazra" ("Send Me A Glance") and "elAlak Had" ("Find Someone").

For the first time before they wed in 2004, Angham worked with Fahd, who co-arranged "Wahadaniya" (Lonely Woman) track alongside Mika. Though the song did not receive much acclaim, Angham received "Best Female Artist" in 2000 for it. Her music video "Bethebbaha Walla" received "Best Music Video" in 1999.

=== 2001–2003: New image, independence and liberalism ===
Angham and Magdy Aref separated in 2000. She said she felt trapped by her relationship with Magdy, whom she often described as controlling. Soon after the separation, Angham hired an independent publicist and a new attorney and manager.

Angham's next album, 'Leih Sebtaha' (Why Did You Leave Her) which was produced by Alam El Phan Records company and released in 2001, yielded the number-one single "Sidi Wisalak" ("Your Charm"), the lyrics and music video for which presented a more overtly feminine and sensual image of her that had been previously seen. She stated that Leih Sebtaha defined the point that she attained full creative control over her music, which continued to move in a steady direction with material mostly written and composed by Bahaa elDeen Mohammad and Sheriff tagg respectively. However, she added: "I never thought it's that much of a departure from what I've done in the past. It's not like I went crazy and thought I was going to be the artist I am now. Personally, this album is about doing whatever I dreamt to do".

"Sidi Wisalak", co-written by Angham and her lifetime friend, Ezzat elGendy, was a commercial success. Both "Sidi Wisalak" and "Magabsh Serty" ("Did He Mention Me") tracks boosted the sales and gave her the title of the best selling living Egyptian female artist. "Magabsh Serty" is the last song that Riyad elHamshari composed for Angham.

That same year, she appeared on 3 Sharee elNoujoum (3 Stars Avenue), a televised programme. She was honored officially as "Egypt's Number 1 Female Artist" in 2001. By the following year, she had entered a relationship with music arranger, Fahd.

Omry Maak ("My Life With You"), Angham's sixteenth studio album, was released in 2003 and produced by the same record company as its precedent. It comprised more R&B, Rock 'n' Roll and ballad songs, many of them arranged by Fahd. "Omry Maak" and "Arrefha Beya" ("Introduce Me To Her") tracks reached number one in the Middle East, in a time when the industry witnessed the release of unsuccessful records from fellow Arabic artists. Media reception of "Omry Maak" was in majority enthusiastic, with the Riyad Newspaper saying the album is like "a state of euphoric love between the loss of human senses and the phenomena of passion in its ultimate summit".

Omry Maak was Angham's third best selling record in her career. She accused Alam El Phan of under-promoting the record: "The current situation that I am living in my professional career is not positive. I'm getting a lot of negative feedback from certain corporate people. I wanted to be free from Alam El Phan", she replied upon the news of her separation from Alam El Phan, adding that the owner of her company refused to let her film Arrefha Beya as her second music video. There were many promises that he did not accomplish. In 2004, Angham released "Khaleeny Maak" ("Keep Me With You") single on St Valentine's Day. It was broadcast on the radio and later on released on the Internet. The track features Fahd's first singing attempt alongside the artist.

=== 2004–2006: Personal and professional struggles ===
Angham's popularity declined with the release of Bahibbik Wahashteeny ("I Love You, I Miss You") record in July 2005. After "بتحب مين" (Who Do You Love), Angham returned to another collaboration with Rotana to produce and promote the 2005 record. She officially joined the record label in March 2004. Angham's new marriage to Fahd topped with her constant exhaustion, second pregnancy and an operation for a kidney stone prior to giving birth made it impossible for the artist to focus on the record. The lead track, "Bahibbik Wahashteeny", got good reviews, and its music video, directed by Hady elBajoury, was filmed in September 2005. In the video, Angham displayed her real pregnancy in the clip while her ex-husband appeared on the clip too briefly at the end. However, due to late production and release of the music video, the audience was unaware of the record's release in the market. Angham tried to boost the sales of the record by filming "بحب نفسي" ("I Love Myself") track as her second music video, but it brought a moderate boost to the overall sales. She began a long series of tours to help promote the record. Two days after the release of the record, she performed a successful concert in Tunisia at the Carthage International Concert alongside artist Ramy Ayash. She participated in the fourth season of Star Academy, appeared on the Maa Hobby (With Love) and "خليك بالبيت"(Stay Home) talk show], and "Saat Samee" ("An Hour of Hearing") on Noujoum FM radio.

Angham performed at "هلا فبراير" ("Welcome February") concert at Kuwait, alongside artist Saber elRibai, Khaled Slim and Hamoud elNaser. Angham then won "صوت الحب" ("Voice Of Love") Award in 2006 at the Alexandria National Music Festival in its fourth round. Despite the promotion, the record became the artist's commercially least successful record in her career.

=== 2007–2008: Return to stardom ===
Angham's eighteenth studio album, Kolma N'arrab (Whenever We Come Closer), was released in 2007 and contained contributions from music composers such as Khaled Ezz, Tamer Ali, Ramy Gamal, Baleegh Hamdy and Sheriff Tagg. After criticisms that Angham is over-using her ex-husband to rearrange the tracks in "Omry Maak" and "Bahibbik Wahashteeny" ("I Love You, I Miss You") records, Angham collaborated with a variety of music arrangers. They include: Fahd, Tarek Madkour, Walid Fayad, Ashraf Mahrous, Tamim and Essam elSharayty. The record features a remake of "Ashky Lmeen" (Who Can I Complain To) as a tribute to Mohamed Mounir. Angham is the first female artist to include a remake in her record for a living artist. Kolma N'arrab became the best-selling record for a female artist in the Middle East in 2007. A reviewer for Almotamar (The Conference) concluded that Angham is the best-selling female artist during summer 2007, beating sales of Lebanese artists Nancy Ajram and Najwa Karam. The record earned Angham a platinum certification. Her music video, which cost US$500,000. and was directed by Ahmad elMahdy, peaked on rank one at Rotana Top 20 chart on 25 August 2007. "Dah Elly Indi Track" peaked at rank two at Radio Orient chart in France, while "Kolma N'arrab" track peaked on rank one on 6 August 2007, at "Eftekasat Top 10 Songs of the Week" chart. Angham won Best Egyptian Female Artist award in 2007 officially given to her by the Nile Entertainment channel.

Angham began a series of televised appearances to promote her record. She appeared on X-Factor at Rotana, "Nejm elNoujoum" (Star of the Stars) in Kuwait, Studio 2M in Morocco and "Maa Hobbi" ("With Love") in Lebanon. She debuted her first tour with a successful performance in Cairo at the "Layali elTelevision" (Nights of the Television) concert on 14 July 2007, which took part at the Chinese Garden, amid a young demographic which surpassed 3000 in number. Kolma N'arrab has been nominated for Best Selling Record at the World Music Award 2007 alongside Amr Diab and Nancy Ajram.

On 3 February 2008, she appeared for the second time on Taratata to honour Egyptian artist, Mohammad Mounir, alongside artists Zein elOmar, Hussein and Houda Haddad. She took part with Syrian singer Asala in the first live airing of "elArrab" (The Mentor) show in its first cycle, hosted by Nichan Deirharotonian. The artist recorded an episode for "Inta Meen" ("Who Are You") programme, hosted by Nadine Fallah on Abou Dhabi Channel. Angham was invited to the "10th Hour" show on Dream channel on the second January 2008.

According to Elaph E-newspaper, Angham will continue her tour and her third concert around the Middle East is due to take place at the Doha's 9th Music Festival, where she will be closing the event alongside Gulf legend artist Mohammad Abdo on 29 January 2008. The concert was a phenomenal success and tabloids acclaimed Angham for her appearance. Angham's second single from the 2005 record, "Mabataallemsh" (Never Learning), was filmed as a music video under the directing of Ahmed elMahdy. The music video peaked number 1 in Rotana for three consecutive weeks, and ranked number 2 in Nadine, a Lebanese magazine.

=== 2009: Nefsy Ahebak ===
For two years, Angham had been working on her nineteenth studio record. The album contains contributions from lyricists Amir Teaima, Bahaa elDin Mohammed, and Mohammad Atef, composers Khaled Ezz, Mohammed Nadi, Tarek Madkour, Walid Saad, Ammar elShareei, and Mohammed Yahiya, arrangists Nader Hamdi, Issam Shrayti, Hassan elShafiei as a substitute of Fahd, and Khaled Ezz. In an interview in Kelmet elFassel (Last Word), she revealed that she would be singing for the first time a Lebanese song written by Catherine Moawwad and composed by Salim Assaf.

According to FilFan, the tracks' names are the following:

- "Yah, Law Ayeesh Maak" (I Wish I can Live With You)
- "Habibi Malak" (Darling, what is up)
- "Nefsi Ahebak" (I wish I love you)
- "Saat Keteer" (Many times)
- "Delwa'ty Ahsan" (Now, I am better)
- "Mahzouma" (Defeated)
- "Fi Wahda Bethebak" (Some girl loves you)
- "Esht Sneen" (For Years I've Lived)
- "Law Nsarah Baad" (If We Were Honest to Each Others)
- "Day Einak" (The sparkle of your eye)
- "Mosh Fi Balak" (Not In Your Mind)
- "Helwa" (Beautiful)

The album was released on 25 June 2009. For the album, Angham recorded "Mahzouma" (Defeated) in Prague with the Philharmonic Orchestra of Prague under the direction of Issam Shrayti, for a cost of $50,000 US, becoming the first female artist to have the most expensive song in the Middle East. As for the music video, Angham's choice of directors was restricted down to either Lebanese director, Nadine Labaki, or Egyptian movie director, Khaled Merghi, who collaborated with her previously in 1999 with the video for "Bethebbaha Walla" (Do You Love Her Or What).

The album was well received by critics and fans.

Angham shot the video clip "Saat Keteer" under the direction of Randa Alam.

== Acting career ==
Angham began to take professional acting lessons in 2000. She made her debut as an actress in the romantic comedy Leila Men Alf Leila (Night of a Thousand Nights) starring prominent actor Yehia elFakharany, actor/artist Ali elHajjar, Sleem Sahab band, and the Cairo Opera House ballet. It was produced by the Cairo Opera House in Egypt. Angham's first acting project was huge, but did not continue for more than two months, and was not aired on television.

Angham's second acting experience was with Ali elHajjar again in the theatrical drama Rossassa fil Alb (Bullet Right in the Heart). The plot was written by Toufic Hakeem and was originally intended for theatre before it was transformed in the 1940s into a movie which starred actor/artist Mohammed Abdel Wahab and actress Rakiya Ibrahim. Angham loved both experiences, but said to Middle East Newspaper:

I benefited from these two experiences a lot, but standing on the stage is a very tiring job, which forces the artist to leave lots of other things including his personal and professional life as a singer to be able to fully focus on it. This was the sole point that I did not like in the acting experience.

Rossassa fil Alb is Angham's most successful acting experience, and many movie offers came later for her. However, she did not accept them because she wanted to focus on her singing career. Among the offers she refused were Sahar elLayali (Sleepless Nights) which was nominated for Best Foreign Movie at the Academy Awards in 2003, in which the singer was supposed to act instead of actress Mona Zaki, Shiqet Maser elJadida (Heliopolis Apartment), Aan elAshk Wel Hawa (About Love and Passion) elShoumouaa elSawdaa (Black Candles) where she was supposedly to remake the acting part of legend actress/artist Najat elSagheera, and Hayat Thekra (Life of Thekra) where Angham was supposedly to remake the life of assassinated Tunisian singer, Thekra.

== Personal life ==
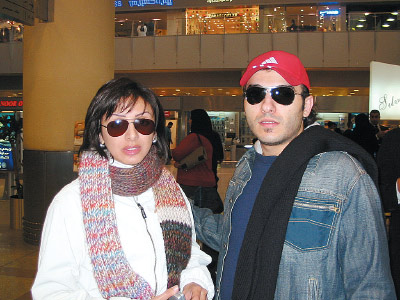
Angham with her ex-husband Fahd at the Kuwait international airport in 2005 for a short visit to Fahd's family

On the talk show Maa Hobby (With Love) in 2005, host Joumana Bou Eid asked Angham how she felt toward her dad after eight years of collaboration in making records. Angham replied that she owes him many things, and that she is lucky he is her father and an important figure in the music industry. The publicity of Angham's separation from her father whether on a personal or artistic level stabilized Angham's independent entrance into the industry of music.

Months before the release of Bet'heb Meen (Who Do You Love) in 1999, Angham married Magdy Aref, an Egyptian businessman and music video director, with whom she had a son named Omar. Angham's father was strongly against his daughter's choice of husband, but the artist married Magdy without her father's approval. In 2000, their divorce caused a riot in the press who criticized Angham's lack of experience in managing to keep her records unaffected by her private life. Angham remained single for four years before she met music arrangist Fahd, with whom she became romantically involved during the making of her 2003 record Omry Maak. In April 2004, they were married in an extravagant ceremony on "The Place" yacht in 2004.

Among the invitees present at the wedding were artists Elissa, Sherine, Mohamed Hamaki, Khaled Agag, Sheriff Makkawy, and Ehab Toufic. Rotana Records company's president, Salem el Hindy, and his spokesperson, Tony Semaan, attended the wedding. Angham's father and son, Omar, chose not to attend her wedding. In December 2005, Angham gave birth to a son Abdel Rahman. The marriage did not last long, and Angham divorced Fahd in June 2008.

Angham was briefly married in 2011 to Egyptian actor Ahmed Ezz before the marriage was annulled in 2012.

== Artistry ==
=== Voice ===
Angham has said that from childhood she was influenced by Arabic classics and soul musicians such as Mohammed Abdel Wahab, Fairuz and Umm Kulthum. Her music contains strong influences of gospel urban contemporary music, Arabic classics, R&B, waltz and lately reggaeton. Angham is said to be able to cover all the notes from alto vocal range to six-octave vocal range.

In her early years, she attempted to emulate Fairuz's simple notes, to ensure an efficient way of communication emotions. In Maa Hobby (With Love) talk show, Angham said that "singing in a low voice is far much more difficult than screaming in high pitch notes. There are not so many artists today that are capable of doing so." Angham's vocal trademark is her ability to sing in the whistle register and to transfer true emotions through her songs.

== Discography ==
=== Studio albums ===
- 1987: Fil Rokn elBaeed elHady (In The Far Distant Corner)
- 1988: Awal Gawab (First Letter)
- 1989: Lalili Lali
- 1989: Layeg (It Suits)
- 1989: Shokran (Thank You)
- 1990: Ettafakna (We Agreed)
- 1991: Bibasata Kida (As Simple As That)
- 1992: Inta El A'alam (You Are The World)
- 1992: Shayfak (I See You)
- 1993: Ella Ana (Except Me)
- 1994: Inta Mahboubi (You Are My Beloved, love)
- 1995: Baollak Eih (Tell You What)
- 1996: Akdar (I Can Make It Through)
- 1996: Shey Daa' (Something Lost)
- 1997: Betheb Meen (Who Do You Love)
- 1998: Khally Bokra li Bokra (Leave Tomorrow for the Future)
- 1999: Wahdaniya (Lonely Woman)
- 2001: Leih Sebtaha (Why Did You Leave Her)
- 2003: Omry Maak (My Life With You)
- 2005: Bahibbik Wahashteeny (Loving You, I Miss You)
- 2007: Kolma N'arrab (Whenever We Come Closer)
- 2009: Nefsy Ahebbak (I'd Like to Love You)
- 2010: Alhekaya Almohamadia (Prophet Mohammad' Story)
- 2010: Mahaddesh Yehasebni (Don'the Judge Me)
- 2015: Ahlam Barea'a (Innocent Dreams)
- 2018: Rah Tezkerny (You will remember me)
- 2019: Hala Khassa Geddan (Very Special Case)
- 2020 : Mazh
- 2024 : Tegy Nsseeb (Let's Break Up)

=== Singles ===
- Nehlam Eih (What Should We Dream Of?) ft. Thekra
- Mahabba (Love) ft. Talal Salama
- Le Soal (I Have a Question) ft. Abdalla Rweished
- Maizza (Preciousness) ft. Abdalla Rweished
- Khaleeny Maak (Keep Me With You) ft. Fahd
- El Ard Hiya Hiya (The Land Will Stay) tribute to Kuwait's liberation
- Azeez We Ghali (Dear and Precious)
- elAmaken (The Places) tribute to Mohammad Abdo
- Ana Mnel Balad Dee (I Am From This Country) tribute to Egypt
- Mitel elAwal (Like The First) released on the Internet
- Hadeeth el Sabah Wel Massa (Talks Of the Mornings and the Nights) intro for episode
- Ra' w Ein (R and N) released for princess Reem elWaleed's wedding
- Ya Rab (Oh God) released for Holy Month of Ramadan
- Hekayat elGharam (Love Stories)
- Ma Bataallemsh (I'll Never Learn)
- Ynayer (January) 25 January 2011
- Sebto (I've left him) 2011
- `Aeish Galby (Staying in the heart) (Khaliji song) 2012
- Law Kont (If You Were) 2012
- Ajmal Makan (The Most Beautiful Place) 2014
- Ann Farh Ghayeb 2017
