= Iraq–Saudi Arabia relations =

- Iraq: Saudi Arabia

Iraq–Saudi Arabia relations are the bilateral and diplomatic relations between the Republic of Iraq and the Kingdom of Saudi Arabia. Both sovereign states share the Iraq–Saudi Arabia border.

Relations between the two countries have historically been shaped by tribal networks, border disputes, competing regional alignments, and broader geopolitical developments in the Middle East. Historians have noted that the relationship was influenced not only by interstate diplomacy, but also by cross-border tribal movement., British imperial involvement, and differing approaches to state-building and governance in frontier regions.

Under Saddam Hussein, relations were manageable, especially after the Iran–Iraq War began in 1980. These manageable relations were soon quelled at the Gulf War, when Saddam's Iraq invaded Kuwait, leading to international sanctions on Iraq and a significant deterioration in Iraqi–Saudi relations. In 1990, the land borders between the two countries closed due to the Iraqi invasion of Kuwait. Saudi Arabia cut ties with Iraq following the invasion, and reestablished relations with Iraq in 2015 after 25 years of isolation.

In 2014, after ISIL invaded Iraq, King Abdullah tried to revive relations between Iraq and Saudi Arabia by setting up an embassy there for the first time since the Gulf War. King Abdullah also attempted to increase Iraqi–Saudi relations by supporting the coalition in the fight against ISIS in Iraq.

Nowadays relations have improved greatly and both countries have emphasized the close historical, religious, ethnic, tribal, linguistic, cultural and geographic ties as well as the promising potential for continuous future cooperation and the need of upholding the current cordial relations between the Saudi Arabian government and the Iraqi government. In 2019, Saudi Arabia opened its consulate in Baghdad. Moreover, 13 agreements were signed between the two countries. Saudi Arabia has also donated $500M to support exports of Iraq and $267M to support development projects.

== History ==
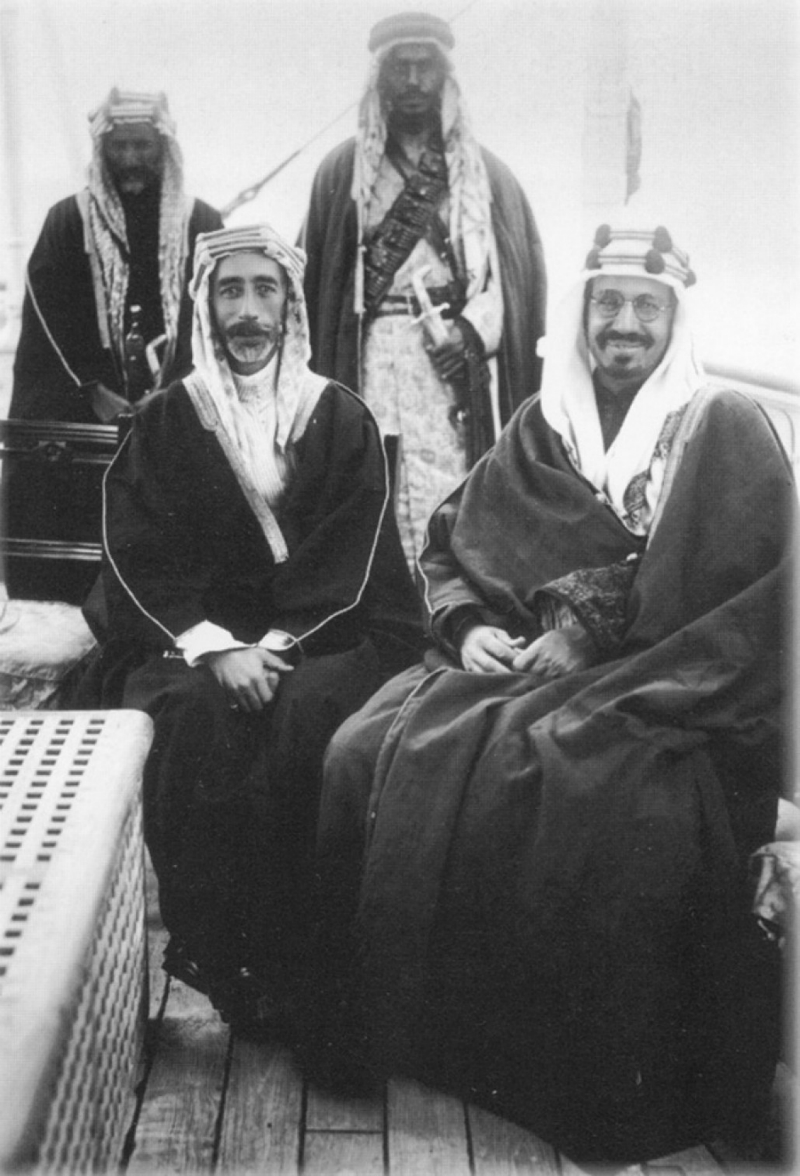
King Faisal I of Iraq and Syria with Ibn Saud of Saudi Arabia in the mid-1920s.

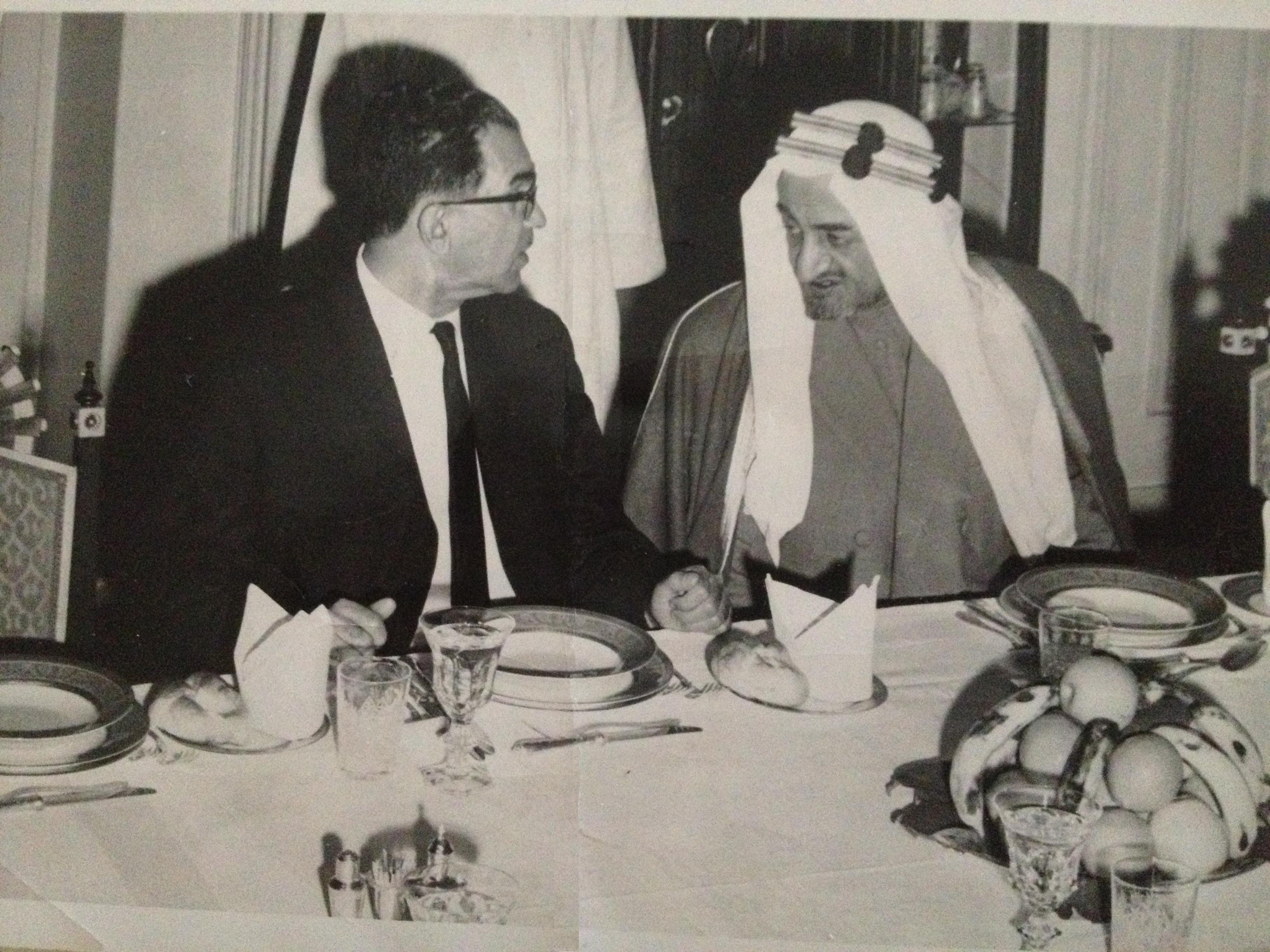
Iraqi Prime Minister Abdul-Rahman al-Bazzaz and King Faisal of Saudi Arabia, 1966

=== Ottoman Era (1790-1914) ===
Since the early 1790s, the Sharif of Mecca had sought to contain Saudi expansion; he corresponded with the Mamluks of Iraq and turned them hostile against the Saudis by portraying them as disbelievers. In 1797, Sulayman Pasha, the Mamluk governor of Iraq, promptly invaded Diriyah with around 15,000 troops in co-ordination with the Sharif of Mecca and laid a one-month siege to Al-Ahsa. However, re-inforcements led by Saud ibn 'Abd al-Azeez would force the coalition to retreat. After three days of skirmish, Sulayman Pasha and the Saudis came to a peace settlement which was to last for years.

The peace would be broken in 1801, when a caravan of pilgrims protected by a Saudi convoy was plundered near Hail; upon orders from the government in Baghdad. This attack would completely break down the already deteriorating Saudi-Iraqi diplomatic relations, and the Emirate of Diriyah sent a large-scale expedition towards Iraq. In 1801-1802, the Saudis sacked Karbala, killing thousands of inhabitants. The assassination in November 1803 of Saudi Emir ‘Abd al-‘Aziz during prayers in Diriyah by an Iraqi was suspected of being orchestrated by the Mamluk governor of Baghdad, further contributing to the negative Saudi perception of Iraq. Iraq was able to repel additional Saudi attacks on Najaf and Hillah in 1803 and 1806, but there remained no challenge to their domination of the desert.

In 1891, the city of Khamasiyah in southern Iraq was founded by Saudi Sheikh Abdullah bin Saleh Al-Khamis Al-Tamimi, a prominent member of the Al-Uqaylat, a renowned commercial network of Najdi traders. Situated in the Iraqi marshlands, the settlement served as a vital trading hub and gathering place for merchants and travellers from the Nejd region. Its population primarily comprised Najdi merchants, who inhabited the town until the unification of Saudi Arabia, after which most returned to their ancestral homeland. Today, historical remnants of the settlement include a mosque, a castle, and several other structures dating back to 1883.

=== British Colonial Era (1914-1958) ===
At the creation of the 1916 Sykes–Picot Agreement, the Hashemites ruled the kingdoms of Hijaz, Transjordan and Iraq. Once Ibn Saud established dominance in central Arabian Najd, he then proceeded to dominate much of the Arabian Peninsula and, with the help of the highly conservative Ikhwan, even conquered the Hashemite Kingdom of Hijaz in 1925. This was the beginning of a struggle between the ruling Hashemite family in Iraq and Jordan and the Saudis.

During the 1920s and 1930s, the Iraq–Najd frontier remained porous, and both governments struggled to impose effective control over tribal populations in the desert borderlands. Tribal groups such as the Shammar and Dhafir maintained cross-border economic and social networks that often complicated state authority. British authorities in Mandatory Iraq played a major role in administering and policing the frontier region. The British relied on aerial reconnaissance, armored patrols, tribal levies, and desert police units to deter raids and monitor tribal movement. Iraqi authorities gradually expanded their own policing infrastructure during the late 1920s and 1930s through the construction of outposts and mobile desert police forces. Saudi Arabia and Iraq developed different approaches toward governance in the borderlands. Iraqi authorities increasingly emphasised centralised administration and security enforcement, while Saudi policy often focused on maintaining ties with tribal and Najdi communities that extended across the frontier.

The tensions during the interwar period were not just dynastic, but also reflected broader disputes over border control, tribal authority, and competing visions of regional order. Between 1922 and 1940, Iraq and Saudi Arabia participated in numerous conferences, treaties, and bilateral negotiations concerning border demarcation, pilgrimage routes, tribal movements, and security arrangements along the frontier. Despite these diplomatic efforts, relations remained characterised by mistrust and recurring disputes over raids, grazing rights, smuggling, and the movement of tribes across the desert frontier.

=== Iraq Republican Era (1958-2003) ===
In 1958, the Hashemites monarchy was overthrown during the 14 July Revolution led by Abd al-Karim Qasim. The revolution significantly altered Iraq’s regional orientation and contributed to tensions with Saudi Arabia, which viewed the rise of revolutionary Arab nationalism and republicanism as a threat to monarchical rule in the region. During this period, Iraq increasingly aligned itself with Arab nationalist movements and maintained closer relations with the Soviet Union, while Saudi Arabia strengthened its partnership with the United States and conservative Arab monarchies. In 1979 Saddam Hussein took control of Iraq and, due to the Iranian revolution in the same year, relations improved between Iraq and Saudi Arabia.

Throughout the 1960s and into the early 1970s, Riyadh suspected Baghdad of supporting political movements hostile to Saudi interests, not only in the Arabian Peninsula but also in other Middle Eastern countries. Saudi–Iraqi ties consequently were strained; the kingdom tried to contain the spread of Arab Nationalism from Iraq by strengthening its relations with states such as Iran, Kuwait, Syria and the United States, all of which shared its distrust of Baghdad.

Beginning in late 1974, however, Iraq began to moderate its foreign policies, a change that significantly lessened tensions between Riyadh and Baghdad. It began at the Rabat Arab summit in October 1974, where Jordan invited Iraq to listen to proposals for how it could resolve differences with Iran, Egypt, and the Saudis. Iraq agreed. Iraq responded with a "charm offensive" that resulted in better relations:

"High-level Iraqi officials, including Vice President Saddam Hussein and President Ahmed Hassan al-Bakr, visited the Kingdom, and ranking Saudis, like Crown Prince Fahd, paid return visits to Baghdad. Iraq ended propaganda efforts critical of the Saudi rulers and suspended covert activities in the Kingdom. In June 1975, the two states settled lingering border issues, agreeing to divide equally the diamond shaped 'neutral zone' carved out by the British in the 1920s."

Saudi Arabia's diplomatic relations with Iraq were relatively cordial by the time the Iranian Revolution climaxed in 1979. The Iranian Revolution of 1979 reshaped regional politics and contributed to closer Saudi–Iraqi cooperation during the early stages of the Iran–Iraq War. Saudi Arabia viewed revolutionary Iran as a major regional threat and provided Iraq with financial and logistical support during the conflict. However, this cooperation remained pragmatic rather than strategic, as longstanding mistrust between Baghdad and Riyadh persisted beneath the alliance. Saudi policymakers viewed the conflict as essential to containing revolutionary Iranian influence in the Gulf region and preserving regional stability.

The Saudis and Iraqis felt threatened by the Iranians' announcements that they would export Islamic revolution, and this shared fear fostered an unprecedented degree of cooperation between both countries. Although Riyadh declared its neutrality at the outset of the Iran–Iraq War in 1980, it helped Baghdad in non-military ways. For example, during the eight year conflict, Saudi Arabia provided Iraq with an estimated US $25 billion in low-interest loans and grants, reserved part of its production from oil fields in the Iraq–Saudi Arabian Neutral Zone for Iraqi customers, and also assisted with the construction of an oil pipeline to transport Iraqi oil across its territory. Despite its considerable financial investments in creating a political alliance with Iraq, Saddam Hussein continued to press claims against Kuwait.

In August 1990, only two years after Baghdad and Tehran had agreed to cease hostilities, Iraqi forces invaded and occupied Kuwait. Saudi Arabia took action against Iraq, claiming Iraq's actions posed a serious threat to its security, and requested the United States and 32 other countries to bring troops into the kingdom. Riyadh's fears concerning Baghdad's ultimate intentions prompted Saudi Arabia to become involved directly in the war against Iraq during January and February 1991. The kingdom's air bases served as the main staging areas for aerial strikes against Iraqi targets, and for personnel of the Saudi Army who participated in both the bombing assaults and the ground offensive. Iraq responded by firing several Scud-B missiles at Riyadh and other Saudi towns. This conflict marked the first time since its invasion of Yemen in 1934 that Saudi Arabia had fought against another Arab state. Saudi and Coalition forces also repelled Iraqi forces when they breached the Kuwaiti-Saudi border in 1991 (see Battle of Khafji).

Consequently, postwar Saudi policy focused on ways to contain potential Iraqi threats to the kingdom and the region. One element of Riyadh's containment policy included support for Iraqi opposition forces that advocated the overthrow of Saddam Hussein's government. In the past, backing for such groups had been discreet, but in early 1992 the Saudis invited several Iraqi opposition leaders to Riyadh to attend a well-publicized conference. To further demonstrate Saudi dissatisfaction with the regime in Baghdad, Crown Prince Abdallah permitted the media to videotape his meeting with some of the opponents of Saddam Hussein.

In spite of this, the Saudi leadership opposed the U.S. plan to invade Iraq in 2003 and did not join the Coalition. Their fears and warnings that Iraq would fracture along sectarian and political lines proved accurate.

=== Modern History (2003-) ===
Following the 2003 invasion of Iraq, Saudi policymakers expressed concern over the expansion of Iranian influence in Iraq and the growing political influence of Shi'a Islamist parties aligned with Tehran. Post-2003 Iraqi governments generally maintained closer relations with Iran. Saudi Arabia initially adopted a cautious approach toward post-2003 Iraq, although relations gradually improved during the 2010s through renewed diplomatic engagement, economic cooperation, and security coordination.

In 2009, Iraq named Ghanim Al-Jumaily its first post-Gulf War ambassador to Saudi Arabia. In January 2012, Iraqi foreign minister Hoshyar Zebari stated that Saudi Arabia had named its first ambassador to Iraq since 1990. Fahd Abdul Mohsen Al-Zaid, the Kingdom's ambassador to Jordan, would serve as non-resident ambassador flying regularly from Amman to Baghdad.

In 2014, former Prime Minister of Iraq Nouri al-Maliki stated that Saudi Arabia and Qatar started the civil wars in Iraq and Syria, and incited and encouraged terrorist movements, like ISIS and al-Qaeda, supporting them politically and in the media, with money and by buying weapons for them. Saudi Arabia denied the accusations which were criticised by the country, the Carnegie Middle East Center and the Royal United Services Institute.

On February 25, 2017, Saudi foreign minister Adel al-Jubeir visited Iraq – the first such visit by a Saudi foreign minister since 1990.

In August 2017, it was reported that the border crossing between Iraq and Saudi Arabia would be reopened. This would be the first time the border was open after approximately 27 years.

On March 25, 2021, Saudi Arabia and Iraq held talks through a video call discussing the relations between the two countries and stressing on the importance of boosting the cooperation on regional and international issues.

In 2024, Iraqi prime minister Mohammed Shia Al Sudani met with Crown Prince Mohammed Bin Salman and together they addressed bilateral relations.

Since the late 2010s, Iraq and Saudi Arabia have expanded diplomatic, economic, and security cooperation through bilateral agreements, infrastructure projects, border reopening initiatives, and high-level political visits.

== Resident diplomatic missions ==
- Iraq has an embassy in Riyadh and consulate-general in Jeddah.
- Saudi Arabia has an embassy in Baghdad and consulate-general in Erbil.

== See also ==
- Foreign relations of Iraq
- Foreign relations of Saudi Arabia
- Iraqis in Saudi Arabia
- Shia–Sunni relations
