= Samira Said =

Moroccan-Egyptian actress and singer (born 1958)

- سميرة سعيد
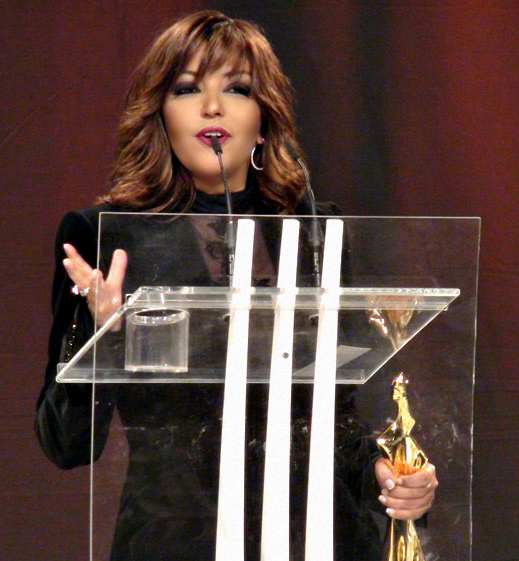
- Said at the 2011 Beirut International Awards Festivals (BIAF)
- Born: Samira Abdelrazak Bensaïd; 10 January 1958 (age 68); Rabat, Morocco
- Occupations: Singer; songwriter; record producer; actress; entrepreneur
- Years active: 1968–present
- Spouses: Hany Mehanna (m. 1988–1994): Mustafa Naboulsy
- Children: 1
- Musical career
- Genres: Egyptian, Arab pop
- Labels: Mazzika; Alam El Phan; Rotana Records

Samira Abdelrazak Bensaïd (Arabic: سميرة عبد الرزاق بنسعيد, romanized: Samīra ʿAbd ar-Razzāq ibn Saʿīd; born 10 January 1958), professionally known as Samira Said (Arabic: سميرة سعيد, romanized: Samīra Saʿīd), is a Moroccan-Egyptian singer who has lived in Egypt for more than 50 years and is known for her Egyptian Arabic genre. In 1980, she was the first (and to date only) artist to represent Morocco in the Eurovision Song Contest.

== Career ==
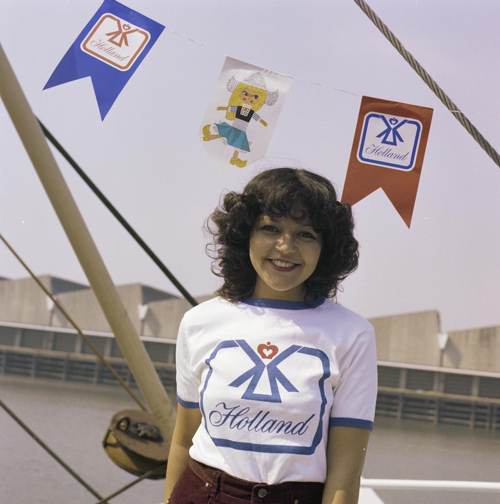
Said on a postcard for the Eurovision Song Contest 1980

Samira Said was born in 1958 in Rabat, in Morocco, to a father from Rabat and a mother from Fez. She began singing at the age of nine, and was discovered on the music program, Mawaheb, broadcast on Moroccan TV. She then moved to Egypt where her fame around the Arab world began. She has dual nationality in Morocco and Egypt, her resident home, as she moved to Cairo in 1977. All her albums are in Egyptian Arabic, but she has also recorded some songs in Moroccan Arabic, such as "Kifash Tlakina" ("How we Met"), "Fayetli sheftek shi marra" ("I've seen you once"), "Sarkouh" ("They Stole Him"), and "Al Behhara" ("Mariners"). Her singles included "Maghlouba" ("Beaten") and "Wa'ady" ("My Love"). In 1980 she represented her native Morocco in the Eurovision Song Contest singing a hit song in Netherlands at that time called Bitaqat Hub, placing 18th out of the 19 contestants.

Said has recorded many Arabic hits that were ranked highly in Egypt, such as "Ben Lef" ("The Circle of Life"), "Sayidati Sadati" (Ladies and Gentlemen"), "Malich 3inwan" ("Ready When You Are") and "Akher Hawa" ("Last Love"). She worked with the Egyptian composer Mohamed El Mougi, and sang and acted in the film Saaktob Ismak Ala Arrimal ("I Will Write Your Name in the Sand"), which included her singing "Yadamiiti Haddi" ("Tears, Fall from My Eyes"). Other recordings include "Lilet El Ouns" ("Magnificent Get-Together"), "Ech Gab Li Gab" ("A Cut about the Rest"), "Amrak Aagib" ("I Don't Get You"), and "Menghir Sabab" ("For No Reason").

In 2000, she released the song "Lilah Habeebee", ("One Night, My Love"), the album title track, which went on to win for best video in the Arab world in 2001 at the Cairo Arabic Music Festival. At the 15th annual World Music Awards in 2003, Said won a World Music Award based on worldwide sales figures for that year. She won the BBC award for world music for the best artist in the Middle East with her album Youm Wara Youm. She has won more than 40 awards.

== Reception ==
Halina Hopkis called Said "an emblem of trans-nationality in her moves between Morocco and Egypt as well the different awards and shows she has received and participated in as a representative of the Arabic music community".

In 2003, Said was chosen as the best singer in the Middle East by BBC Radio 3 Awards for World Music. She won the Rabab D'or prize at the Tétouan's Voix des Femmes Festival in 2008. She was the winner of the Murex d'Or Award in 2009.

At the 2009 Timitar Festival in Agadir, Said performed for a crowd of 100,000. In 2011, the Beirut International Award Festival (BIAF) honored a number of Arab and international singers, including Said.

She has been both credited and criticized for bringing Arab music into the pop-driven, commercially fueled 21st century.

According to Egyptian newspaper Al Ahram, Said's albums have sold over 60 million copies. Aweeny Beek is the top selling Arabic album in the Middle East and worldwide to date, with over 10 million copies released in 2004.

== Musical style ==
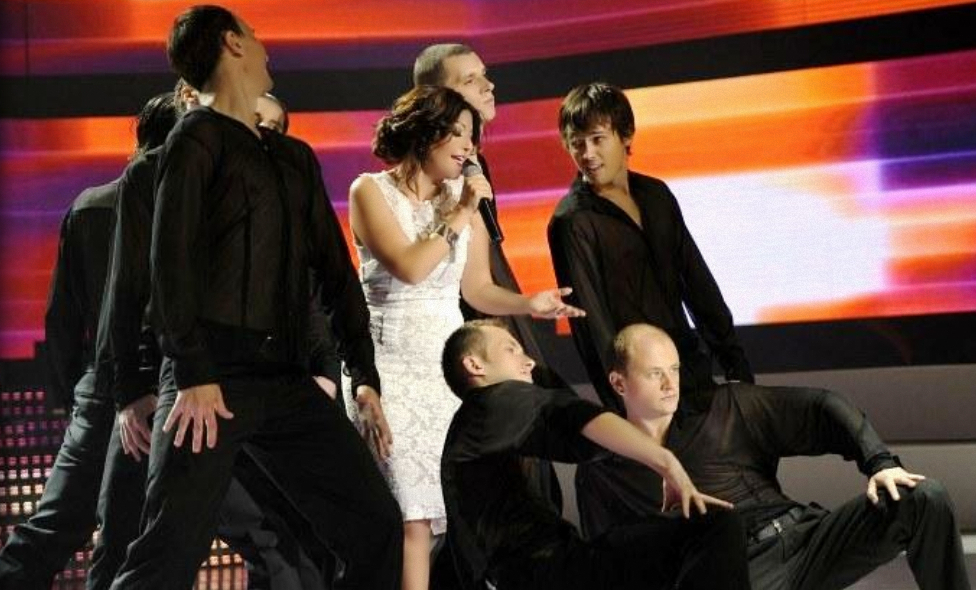
Said performing on the Star Academy Arab World TV show; Beirut, Lebanon; 8 July 2011

Halina Hopkins said that "One reason Said’s music is popular is because of the tonal beauty of her voice against the background instrumentation. The centrality of her voice represents her personal influence in her work.

== Personal life ==
Said was married to Egyptian musician Hany Mehanna from 1988 to 1994. She then married businessman Mustafa Naboulsy, with whom she had her only son, Shady.

In multiple interviews, Said has expressed her desire to return to Morocco and live near her family and loved ones.

== Philanthropy and humanitarian work ==
Said spearheaded concerts to draw people together after the 2006 riots in immigrant suburbs across France and solidarize between faiths.

== Discography ==
- El hob elli ana a'aycheh (1975)
- Ben Lif (1979)
- Bitaqat Hub (1980)
- Hikaya (1981)
- Allemnah el Hob (1982)
- Ketr al Kalam (1983)
- Methaya'li (1984)
- Lilet el Ouns (1984)
- Ya Damaiti Haddi (1984)
- Ehki ya Shehrazade (1985)
- Youm akablak Fih (1985)
- Ech gab li gab (1985)
- Amrak ajib en (1986)
- Ana walla anta (1989)
- Moch hatnazel a'anak (1986)
- Sibak (1986)
- Ya ebn al halel (1987)
- Ghariba (1988)
- Sibni louahdi (1988)
- Ensani (1989)
- Ba'adin neta'ateb (1990)
- Choft el amar (1991)
- Hannitlak (1992)
- Khayfa (1992)
- a'ach'a (1993)
- Enta habibi (1995)
- Wallah Mahansak (1995)
- Kolli de echa3at (1996)
- A'al bal (1998)
- Rouhi (1999)
- Laila habibi (2001)
- Youm Wara Youm (2002)
- Awweeni Beek (2004)
- Best of Samira Said (1995-2005)
- Ayaam Hayati (2008)
- Be winner ft. Fnaire (2010)
- Khallouh (2010)
- Mazal (2013)
- Ayza Aeesh (2015)
- Ensan 'Ali (2021)
