= Yasmine Niazy =

Egyptian pop singer (born 1985)

Yasmine Niazy ياسمين نيازي
- Born: October 12, 1985 (age 40); Al Giza, Egypt
- Genres: Pop
- Occupation: Singer
- Years active: 2009–present
- Labels: Rotana (2009–present)

Yasmine Niazy (Arabic: ياسمين نيازي) (born October 12, 1985 in Al Giza) is an Egyptian pop singer. She graduated from the National Conservatory, Cairo.

== Discography ==
- 2009 Shaklak Htouhshny (شكلك هاتوحشني) It seems that I will miss you Rotana Records
- 2011 Hobak Amel Saytara (حبك عامل سيطره) "Your love has control" Rotana Records
