= Shayma Helali =

- شيماء هلالي
- Born: Shayma Helali; 3 May 1985 (age 39); Tunis, Tunisia
- Occupation(s): Singer and actress
- Years active: 2006–present
- Musical career
- Genres: Arabesque, Middle Eastern, Arabic music, Khaliji
- Labels: Rotana Music Group

Shayma Helali (Arabic: شيماء هلالي), (born 3 May 1985) is a Tunisian singer and actress.

== Career ==
Shayma Helali was born in Tunis on May 3, 1985. She has studied three years in the academy of music in Tunis where she has got a perfect vocal technique. At age 21 she passes smoothly the selection criteria of LBC Star Academy. She participates to the season 3 of the program in 2006.

She went to the semifinals but the adventure stopped for her at the gates of the final. Her passage, however, is convincing. With her stage performance full of grace and her deep and vibrant voice has something of the star of the Orient Oum Kalthoum. All that remains for her is to lunch her career. She then moved to Beirut in Lebanon. Chaima is spotted in 2008 by a highly successful duo with Assi El Hellani, a genuine legend and Eastern veteran Lebanon showbiz.

Together they cover the classic Rja3ni Aw Raja3ni . In 2009, finally she released her first solo single Meen Bya3sha2 Bid2i2a composed by Salim Salama and written by Fares Eskander. This single was followed by others like "Ana Nahwek" and "Fakra".

In 2011, after the revolution that lunches the Tunisian Arab spring, the former candidate of Star Academy made in Lebanon releases an anthem to the country "Ya Tunis El Khadra" rather well received, followed by a second concerning the same subject matter "Law tinadini biladi". The talent of Chayma worth probably better, as it proved in 2009 in the vocal a cappella version of the title "El Ayam Daret" but the jungle of the music market and show business logic have a different view. In 2014, Shayma got the award of best song for her tube " Emta nsitek" from the General Union for the Arab Producers and the award of best young singer in Middle East Music Awards ( MIMA awards). IN 2016 Shyama Helali joined Rotana and released her first album with them "Shayma Helali 2016".

== Personal life ==
Shayma Helali's marriage took place in January 2018. She announced her marriage on Instagram.

== Discography ==
=== Albums ===
- wala yhemak (2013)
- e7sasi (2015)

=== Videos ===
- Min biaacha2 bdkika
- Emta nsitak
- Wala yhemak
- Edii alih
- Hawelt aradhik
- ya nhar
- El kadhia
- Hawelt
