= Omry Maak =

Omry Maak (My Life With You)

Studio album by Angham
- Released: 10 August 2003 (Egypt)
- Recorded: 2001–2003
- Genre: Rock & Roll, valse, jazz, Arabic pop, folklore, punk
- Label: Alam elPhan
- Producer: Alam elPhan(Producer), Mohsen Gaber (Executive producer)

Angham chronology
Leih Sebtaha (2001)	Omry Maak (My Life With You) (2003)	Bahibbik Wahashteeny (2005)

Omry Maak (My Life With You) is the sixteenth full-length Arabic studio album from Egyptian pop singer Angham, released in Egypt on 13 August 2003.

== Track listing ==
1. Omry Maak (My Life With You) (Lyrics by: Ezzat elGendy | Music composed by: Sherif Tagg | Music arrangements by: Fahd)
2. Mayhemsh (It Doesn't Matter) (Lyrics by: Khaled Mounir | Music composed by: Sherif Tagg | Music arrangements by: Fahd)
3. Arrefha Beya (Introduce Me To Her) (Lyrics by: Essam Husni | Music composed by: Tamer Ali | Music arrangements by: Fahd)
4. Esra'ny (He Captured Me) (Lyrics by: Sameh elAgami | Music composed by: Sheriff Tagg | Music arrangements by: Tarek Madkour)
5. Bahtag Etkallem (In Need To Talk) (Lyrics by: Ayman Bahgat Amar | Music composed by: Khaled Ezz | Music arrangements by: Fahd)
6. T'heb Atghayar (You Like Me to Metamorphose) (Lyrics by: Tarek Abdel Setar | Music composed by: Sherif Tagg | Music arrangements by: Akram eSharkawi)
7. Ana Mkhassmak (I Am Mad At You) (Lyrics by: Nader Abdallah | Music composed by: Sherif Tagg | Music arrangements by: Mohammad Mustafa)
8. Ala Fekra (By The Way ) (Lyrics by: Saoud Ben Abdallah | Music composed by: elFaissal | Music arrangements by: Fahd)
9. Shoft elDonia (Did You See The World) (Lyrics by: Khaled Mounir | Music composed by: Sheriff Tagg | Music arrangements by: Fahd)
10. Feinak (Where Are You) (Lyrics by: Mohammad Hamed | Music composed by: Tamer Ali | Music arrangements by: Fahd)
11. Regena f'Kalamna (Back to Our Conversation) (Lyrics by: Nader Abdallah | Music composed by: Tamer Ali | Music arrangements by: Fahd)
12. Halak (Your State) (Lyrics by: Essam Husni | Music composed by: Tamer Ali | Music arrangements by: Fahd)
13. Arrefha Beya [remix] (Introduce Me To Her) (Lyrics by: Essam Husni | Music composed by: Tamer Ali | Music arrangements by: Fahd)
