= Arwa (singer) =

Arwa أروى إيمان سالم باعميران
- Born: Iman Salem Ba'amiran; July 8, 1976 (age 50); Kuwait City, Kuwait
- Genres: World, Arabic
- Occupation: Singer
- Years active: 1999–present

Arwa (Arabic: أروى; born Iman Salem Ba'amiran (Arabic: إيمان سالم باعميران); July 8, 1976) is a Yemeni-Egyptian singer and television host.

== Early life ==
Iman Salem Ba'amiran was born in Kuwait to a South Yemeni father and an Egyptian mother. At the age of 10, her family moved to Cairo where she later received her education at Cairo University studying engineering. She began her singing career in 1999 and has released four albums.

In 2009, Arwa became host for an entertainment television show called Akher Man Ya'lam (The Last To Know). The first episode was aired on September 27, 2009, on MBC 1. In 2010, she received a Golden Award for her television show at the "Khalij" radio and television festival.

== Discography ==
- 1999 Ragaak Waqtak
- 2001 Arwa 2
- 2003 Ahla Ayami
- 2006 Inta Arafane
- 2009 Ghasseb Aannak
- 2014 Ya Moumayyaz
- 2018 Omy Alyemen

== See also ==
- Balqees Ahmed Fathi
