= Fella El Djazairia =

Fella El Djazairia فلة الجزائرية
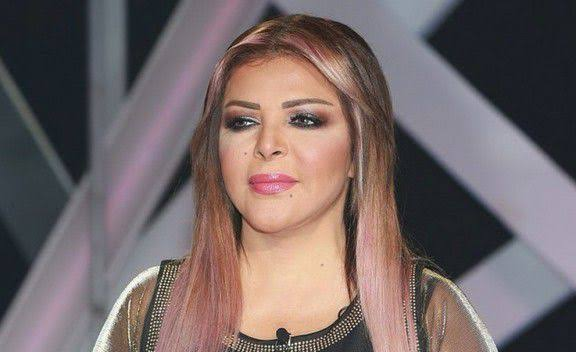
- Born: Fella Abd al-Hamid Ababsa فلة عبد الحميد عبابسة; 23 April 1961 (age 65); Saint Denis, France
- Other names: Fella Soltana, Fulla, Fulah, Folla
- Years active: 1993–present
- Musical career
- Genres: Music of Algeria, Arabic music, pop, Arabesque-pop music
- Instruments: Vocals, piano
- Labels: Alanoud Production, Rotana Music Group, Stallions Records, EMI Music Arabia

Fella Ababsa (Arabic: فلة عبابسة; born 23 April 1961), better known by her stage name Fella El Djazairia (فلة الجزائرية, literally 'Fella the Algerian'), is an Algerian singer, pianist, actress, and performer. She has also used the stage name Fella Soltana.

== Biography ==
Fella Ababsa was born in the Paris suburb of Saint Denis, France, then moved to Algeria with her family a couple of years later. She comes from a well-known Algerian artistic family. Her father Abdelhamid Ababsa was a poet, musician and singer. Her brother Najeeb is a popular singer and so is her sister Naima.

From a very young age she was surrounded by Andalousian and Algerian music, and learnt the piano and the Oud as well as other musical instruments. At 15 years old, she joined musical groups in the capital, then aged 20 she left for a series of shows in London where she had built up publicity and stayed for several years and perfected her knowledge of oriental music. She also performed in the United States in the early 1990s.

Though she's Algerian, she often sings in Egyptian-Arabic, as she never could get popularity in the Maghreb, she went later on to Egypt and the Middle-East and with success. However Ababsa's first songs were sung in Algerian-Arabic, she also sings occasionally in English, like in 'Rani Jay'. Probably the most remarkable point about her is that she never sung in French, which is widely used by North-African singers.

The first single on Lama ra Eato, Enta Habibi (You are my honey), ranked No. 5 on the official Pepsi Top Ten on the Rotana charts Fulla stated at a news conference she held in Dubai that Syrian singer Assala Nasri and her husband Tarek Al Eryan helped her enter Egypt. Fulla was signed to Rotana.

== Personal life ==
She was married to an Algerian at age 16/17, and had with him her daughter, Soukaina. They lived together in the United Kingdom, then they divorced and she came back to Algeria. Later on, she married Kuwaiti businessman Najeeb Al-Mutawa, and the iraqi Oud player, Omar Bachir.

In 1996, she was accused of "adultery" when she was engaged to Egyptian footballer Gamal Abdel-Hamid in Egypt, thus she was sentenced for three years in prison and banned from entering Egypt afterwards. She later accused Tunisian singer Latifa, and Egyptian lawyer Mortada Mansour, of being behind that false accusation. In 2011, she tried to enter Egypt but she was denied entry.

== Discography ==
- Fiq Ya Aachek Ezzin (1992)

Fiq Ya Aachek Ezzin • Tahmouni Bik • El Walf • Ya Qualbi • Ya Sbai Gholbi • Manahki Manachki

- Singin' Raï (1993)

Rani Jay • Ya Rayt • Lawah • Ghazali • El Wahdaniya • Mazal • Singin' Raï

- Oriental Magic (1998)

Anta Eli Khtart • Sinene Essamt • Mnawar Hayena • Ya Layali El Farah • Bi Anwar El Farah

- Sidi Khaled (2000)

Sidi Khaled • Galou Ma Galou • Hay Hannani • Zein El Moustach • Rayeh Jay • Nassi Rahala

- Ki Lyoum (2000)

Sebaa • Balek Machghoul • Ya Tayeb El Galb • Netsamah • Chahel Layen • Ajini • Mesbah Eddawi • Kloub El Hassad • Testahel Ya Qualbi • El Maaquara • Ki Lyoum

- Tashakurat (2001)

Mahlan Alay • Tashakurat • Hilmak • Kan Yamakan • Men Ana • Shaka Baka • Dakhlak Ya Lail • Abkaitani

- Cocktail Tunisien (2003)

Bakhnoug • Ya Khalila • Ya Mou Lawin Ezerga • Wi Baan Khoulkhal Aicha • Ya Lalalli • Lal Galla • Achiri Lawa • Fi Gallala Nachbah Zouz Bnaat • Morjana • Addala • Rakba El Khayal • Ya Bent Blad • Mahanni Ezzine • Mahlaha • Ya Lalla • Sarrek Mathl Ou • Aalach Ma Nahwa Kan Enta

- Sahrat Tarab (2006)

Aally Jara • Lula El Malamah • Ana Ben Tetharek • Nasem Aalena El Hawa • Mestaneyak • Fe Yom Wa Laila

- Badr 14 (2004 or 2006)

Bostan Al Fol • Ma Sedi Ella Allah • Hakalko Eeh • Saher • Habebi Al Ghali • Badr 14 • Matha Dahak • Aafwan 'Aam Bghanni • Ma Beser • Nadmah

- Ahl El Maghna (2006)

Wala Hatta Sanya • Ahel El Maghna • Youboua El Hawa • Aala Alla Min Tewalaa • Wiledi El Ghali • Enkalish Omri • Hmelni Elak • Omri 'Aam Bedea • Kelma Wel Salam

- Lama Raayto (2007)

Kaheel El Ain • Leh Kidah • Enta Habibi • Shamaly Wali • Takhayal • Kan Zaman • Lama Raayto

- Ya Mesafer Lel Jefa (2009)

Kil Hal Hob • Mashi Mashi • Ya Maolana • Shil Jadeed • Yamasafir Liljafa • Enta Hobbi • Samah Allah Habibi • Ana Men Sadag Ahebbo • Ya Teebi • Yezeed El Shog • Aysha Leih
