= Balqees (singer) =

Yemeni Emirati actress and singer

Balqees Fathi
- بلقيس فتحي
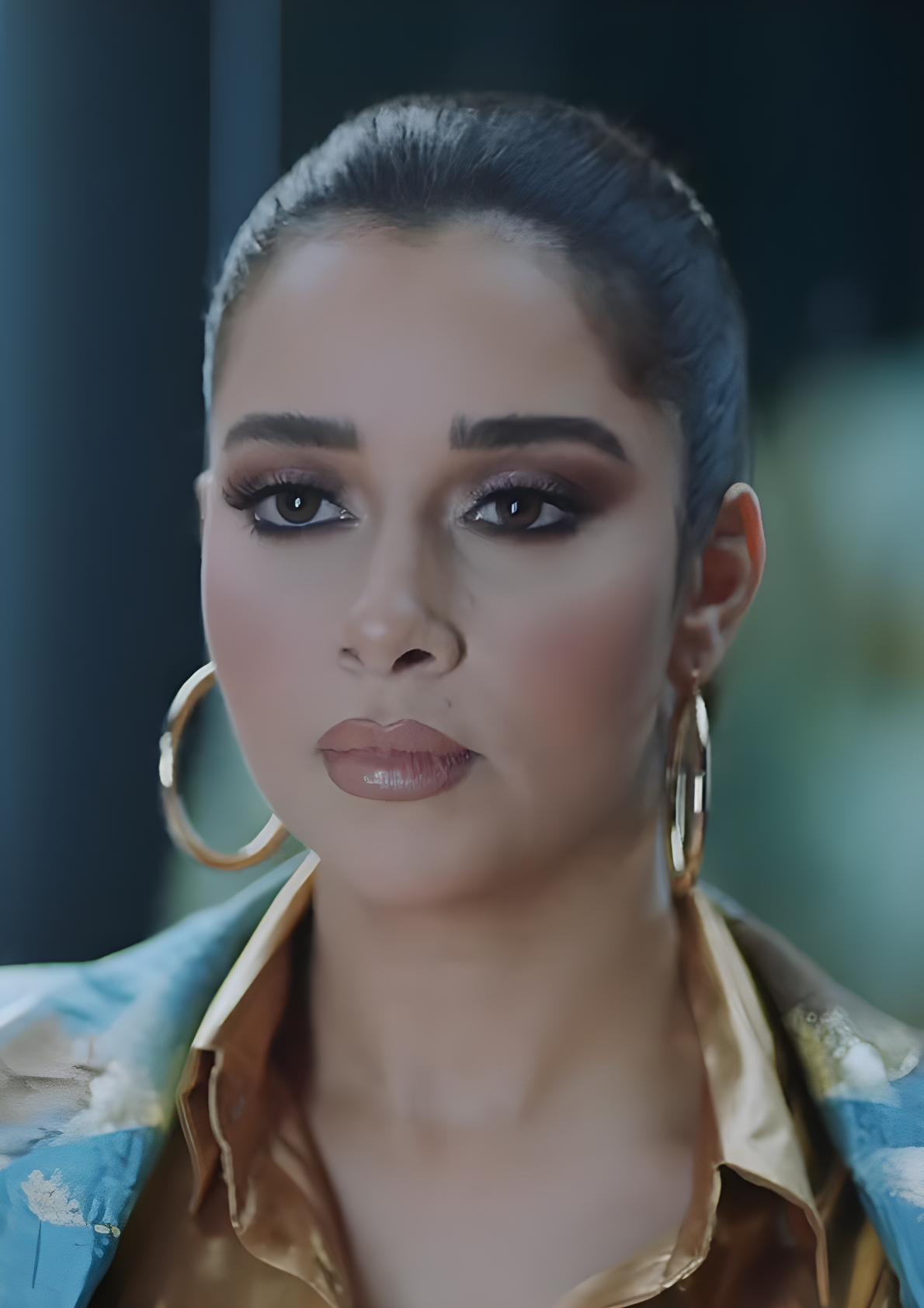
- Balqees in 2021
- Born: Balqees Ahmed Fathi; 20 October 1984 (age 42); Abu Dhabi, United Arab Emirates
- Occupations: Singer; actress
- Years active: 2011–present
- Musical career
- Genres: Arabic pop; world; opera; pop
- Label: Rotana (2013–2017)

Balqees Ahmed Fathi (Arabic: بلقيس أحمد فتحي; born 20 October 1984), widely known by the mononym Balqees (بلقيس), is a Yemeni-Emirati singer and actress. She came from an artistic family as her father Ahmed Fathi was a well-known Yemeni musician and her mother is also a Yemeni with an Emirati citizenship.

== Career ==
Balqees began early in music learning to play instruments and singing. She released her debut album Majnoun in 2013 through Rotana Records. She released her second studio album Zai Ma Ana in 2015.

She released a music video World Chants Zayed as a theme dedicated for 40th National Day Celebration of United Arab Emirates. She graduated from Abu Dhabi University.

On October 20, 2019, she unveiled her star on the walkway of the Dubai Stars at downtown Dubai. In October 2022, she was chosen to feature in Light The Sky, a song for the 2022 FIFA World Cup in Qatar, collaborating with artists, RedOne, Manal, Rahma Riad and Nora Fatehi.

== Personal life ==
Balqees married Saudi Arabian businessman Sultan Bin Abdullatif in 2016, with whom she had a son. She filed for divorce in 2021.

In August 2021, she unveiled her wax figure at Madame Tussauds in Dubai.

== Discography ==
=== Studio albums ===
- Majnoun (2013)
- Zai Ma Ana (2015)
- Arahenkom (2017)
- Hala Jdeeda (2021)
- Samrat Balqees (2025)

=== Singles ===
- "Masala Sahla" (2011)
- "Al Shear Diwan" (2011)
- "Ya Hawa" (2012)
- "Ana Radhi" (2014)
- "Beyrq Al Azz" (2014)
- "Ya Alamna" (2014)
- "Ya Rafeeqat Omri" (2015)
- "Zaffet Abdullah Wa Lujain" (2016)
- "Mouchtag La 'inak" (2016)
- "Khalina" (2016)
- "Shaltari" (2016)
- "Kol Al Kawakeb" (2016)
- "Ala Zeker Al Nabi Sallo (Zaffa)" (2016)
- "Wayyak Khedni" (2016)
- "Kheel Al Qaseed" (2016)
- "Doq Al Qaa Daqaah" (2017)
- "Ajras Al Walah" (2017)
- "Romana (Music from the Original TV Series)" (2017)
- "Ana Al Alam" (2017)
- "Aam Alkheir" (2017)
- "Elbesy Thawbek Alabyad" (2018)
- "Ahlan Ya Mama" (2018)
- "Shofli Hal" (2018)
- "Galow Ashyaa" (2018)
- "Aresna" (2019)
- "Ana Ma Aateqed" (2019)
- "La Taleeq" (2019)
- "Bent Zayed" (2019)
- "Taala Tchouf" (2019)
- "Ya Galbi" (2020)
- "La Vie Is Good" (feat. DJ Youcef) (2020)
- "Bahr Rikbah Ghalahm - Nas Ghazer Mahum" (2020)
- "Haza Malekona" (2020)
- "Najmah Wa Ghmamah" (2020)
- "Ya Tair Al Hob" (2020)
- "Ya Qamar Ya Yamani (Cover)" (2020)
- "Hala Jdeeda" (feat. Queen G) [Dodom] (2021)
- "Khaf Alayi" (2021)
- "Momken" (feat. Saif Nabeel) (2021)
- "Entaha" (2021)
- "Jabbar" (2021)
- "Diplomacy" (2021)
- "Janoub Al Darb" (2021)
- "Khamseen" (2021)
- "Sabra" (2022)
- "El-Eid Ga" (2022)
- "Wendala" (2022)
- "Ahl Aleshg" ( feat . Kadhim Al-Saher) (2022)
- "Mazagangy" (2022)
- "Light the Sky [Music from the FIFA World Cup Qatar 2022]" ( feat. Nora Fatehi, Rahma Riad, Manal, RedOne) (2022)
- "Amam Mrayti" (2022)
- "Da Elly 7sal" (2023)
- "Araftouh" (2023)
- "Ghlak Elzam" (2023)
- "Alf Rooh" (2023)
- "Zaeem Al Maarifa" (2023)
- "Eshthakarak Biya" (2023)
- "Khedi El-Ghamrat" ( feat. Marwan Khoury) (2024)
- "Chkoun Kan Ygoul" (2024)
- "El-Gedeed" (2024)
- "Hawelt Aghayeer" (2024)
- "Tawaak Galbek" (2024)
- "Almah Lak" (2024)
- "Lagat Alaysh AlSultana" (2025)
- "Habboub Habboub La Taghdab" (2025)
- "Ya Mtaneshna" (2025)
- "Modalali" (2025)

=== Charted songs ===
Title	Year	Peak chart position	Album
Title	Year	MENA	Album
"Da Elly 7sal"	2023	7	Non-album single

== See also ==
- Arwa
