= Esraa Alaseel =

Iraqi singer of Palestinian descent

Esraa Alaseel إسراء الأصيل
- Born: Esraa Ali Abdul Hussein Kadhim Aljubouri إسراء علي عبد الحسين كاظم الجبوري; November 17, 1995 (age 30); Amman, Jordan
- Occupations: Singer, actress, songwriter
- Years active: 2011–present
- Musical career
- Label: Rotana Records

Esraa Ali Abdul Hussein Kadhim Aljubouri (Arabic: إسراء علي عبد الحسين كاظم الجبوري; born November 17, 1995), better known as Esraa Alaseel (إسراء الأصيل), is an Iraqi singer-songwriter, best known for her songs "Abu Elbanat" and "Matseer Ilak Kul Chara".

== Early life ==
Alaseel was born in Amman, Jordan. Her father was the Iraqi musician, singer, and songwriter Ali Alaseel, and her mother is from Jordanian-Palestinian descent.
