= Waed =

Waed وعد
- Birth name: Hannan Bakr Younis حنان بكر يونس
- Born: 16 August 1971 (age 53)
- Origin: Saudi Arabia
- Genres: Arabic music
- Occupation: Singer
- Years active: 1980–present
- Labels: Rotana Records; EMI Music Arabia

Hanan Younis (Arabic: حنان يونس; born 16 August 1971), widely known by her stage name Waed (Arabic: وعد; meaning "promise" in Arabic), is a Saudi singer and entertainer in the Middle East.

== Biography ==
Waed was born and raised in Saudi Arabia. Her father is Baker Younis, who is one of the founders of the broadcasting station and television in Saudi Arabia and her mother is of Iraqi descent. At an early age, Waed enjoyed listening to a variety of music and her only dream was to become a singer. Waed's first appearance on television was when she sang at the age of 7 in a children's program. She took part in numerous shows/clubs in high school as well as in various charitable organization's concerts. Waed's voice is distinguished with an ability to express a character and a performance of her own. This allowed her to perform many songs written by Saudi composers such as Mohamed Abdu and Talal Maddah. Waed has made many performances and interviews on various television and radio stations all over the Arab world.

== Personal life ==
Waed was married to a Lebanese shortly in the early 2000s, with whom she had one daughter.

== Discography ==
=== Studio albums ===
- 2001: Jonoun
- 2004: Wejhat Nazar
- 2008: Ya Ahlahoum
- 2018: Ya Kaoeni
