= Tamer Ashour =

Egyptian singer and composer

Tamer Ashour تامر عاشور
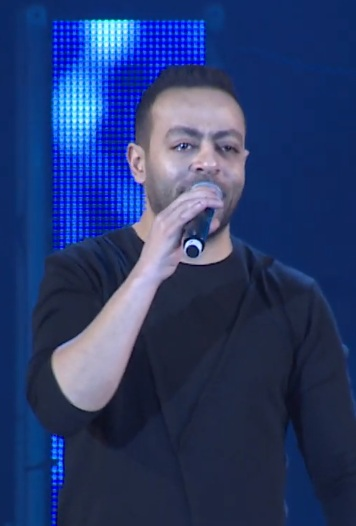
- Tamer Ashour, Jeddah, 24 January 2020

Background information
- Born: 2 January 1984 (age 42)
- Origin: Egypt
- Genres: pop
- Instruments: guitar, piano
- Years active: 2004–present

Tamer Ashour (Arabic: تامر عاشور; also spelt Tamer Ashour or Tamer Ashur, born 2 January 1984) is an Egyptian singer and composer. From 2004 to 2011 he released more than 17 songs and 4 albums. Some of his better-known songs include "Zikrayat Kaddaba" ("Lying Memories"), "Ekhtarna Leh" (Why We Chose), "Thania Wahda" ("One second"), and "Enta Ekhtart" ("You Chose").

== Career ==
Ashour released his album "Sa'ab" (Difficult) in 2006, which included material he'd recorded prior to 2006 as well as new music. Different production companies competed to sign him, and in 2008 he joined Rotana. The album Bieyheb followed in late 2008.

He subsequently released four more albums, including Ayam in 2019. In May 2020, he collaborated with Vodafone Egypt on a song paying tribute to Egyptian medical workers for their efforts during the COVID-19 pandemic. In 2020, Ashour ranked as the sixteenth most-streamed Arab singer on Anghami and was also among the 50 most-streamed artists in the Middle East and North Africa on Deezer.

His song Haygely Mawgow marked a significant turning point in his career and became one of his biggest hits. The song achieved considerable success across streaming platforms and received a strong response during his live performances. At the 2024 Billboard Arabia Music Awards, Haygely Mawgow won Song of the Year and Top Egyptian Song, with Tamer Ashour receiving two awards for the song.

== Albums ==
- 2006: Sa'ab
- 2008: Bieyheb
- 2011: Leia nazrah
- 2014: Esht maak hekayat
- 2017: Khayaly
- 2019: Ayam
- 2022: Tegy Ntrahen
- 2022: Heya Elnas ( Single )
- 2022:Hatwhashna ( Single )
- 2023: Es7a Le El Kalam ( Single )
- 2023 :Adeit ( Single )
- 2024 : Haygely Mawgow3 ( single )
- 2024 :Wada3 Wada3 ( Single )
- 2024: Yaah
