= Sherine =

Egyptian singer and actress (born 1980)

- شيرين
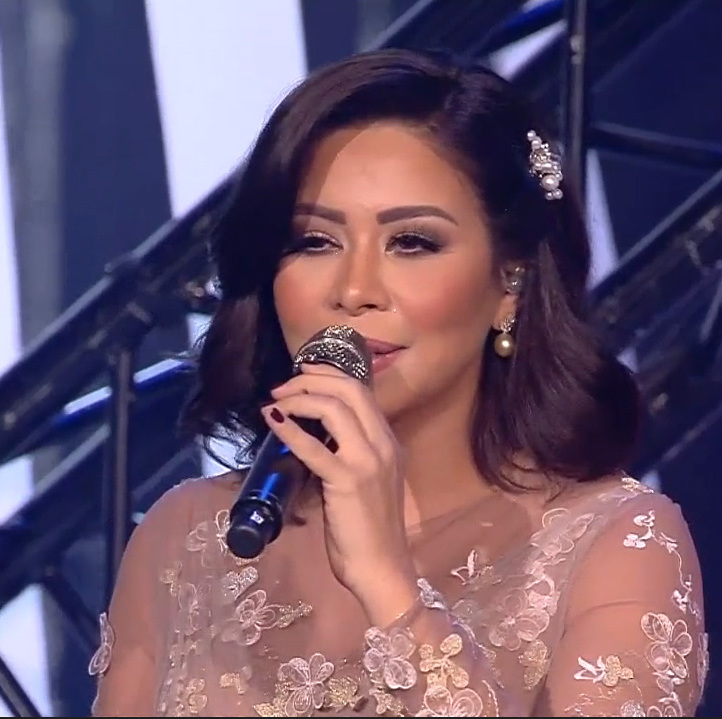
- Sherine in 2017
- Born: Sherine Sayed Mohamed Abdel Wahab; 8 October 1980 (age 46); Cairo, Egypt
- Occupations: Singer; actress
- Years active: 1999–present
- Spouses: Mohamed Moustafa (m. 2007; div. 2012) Hossam Habib (m. 2018; div. 2021) (m. 2022; div. 2023) (m. 2025)
- Children: 2
- Musical career
- Genres: Egyptian; Classical
- Instrument: Vocals
- Labels: Free Music Art Production (1999–2006); Rotana Music Group (2007–2012); Nogoum Records (2013–2018); Rotana Music Group (2019–2024); Sony Music Entertainment (2025–Present)

Sherine Sayed Mohamed Abdel Wahab (Note: (Arabic: شيرين سيد محمد عبد الوهاب)) (born 8 October 1980) is an Egyptian singer and actress, who is dubbed "The Voice of Egypt". Sherine was formerly a judge on MBC's The Voice: Ahla Sawt.

Sherine Abdel-Wahab has built a successful musical career spanning more than two decades.

== Early and personal life ==
She was born on October 8, 1980, in Cairo, Egypt to a middle-class family. Her father was a decorator, and her mother, a housewife. She also has one brother and one sister.

Sherine married a second time on April 12, 2018 in Cairo, Egypt to Hossam Habib, an Egyptian pop singer. The wedding was attended by immediate family members, the managers and organizers of the couple, including Sherine's daughters from her previous marriage to Egyptian composer, Mohamed Moustafa. Sherine and Hossam Habib divorced in 2021, but the pair remarried a year later. In December 2023, they divorced after their remarriage. In 2024, Sherine filed assault charges against her ex-husband Habib.

== Music career ==
As a child, Sherine's vocal talent was first discovered by her music teacher at school. At the age of nine, her teacher convinced her mother to take her to the Cairo Opera House to meet Selim Sahab, an Egyptian classical music conductor. She sang in front of him, and he liked her voice a lot. From the age of nine to the age of 12, she sang as a choral member at the Cairo Opera House, then she was given a chance to perform as a solo singer and had tremendous success. She kept singing at the Cairo Opera House while looking for a music producer to start her professional career. At the age of 18, she was introduced to Nasr Mahrous, a prominent starmaker, director and music producer, he liked her voice and decided to collaborate with her through the company, Free Music, where she met with Tamer Hosny, then a new talent seeking an opportunity too. Nasr Mahrous decided to make her debut as a joint album for both Tamer Hosny and Sherine included two duet songs showcasing them together. The album was released in September 2002, by the title Free Mix3 - Tamer & Sherine and was a big hit all across the entire Middle East and North Africa. The album sold more than 20 million copies across the whole Middle East and North Africa.

In 2003, she released a commercially successful album called Garh Tani.

In 2005, she released ‘‘Lazem Ayeesh’’ (’‘I Must Live’’) through Free Music Company, followed by ‘‘Batamenak’’ (’‘I Reassure You’’) in 2008 and ‘‘Habeit’’ (’‘I Loved’’) in 2009 after signing with Rotana. She continued her success with ‘‘Esaal Alaya’’ (’‘Ask About Me’’) in 2012 and ‘‘Ana Kteer’’ (’‘I’m a Lot’’) in 2014, both of which featured several popular songs. She also contributed songs to the soundtrack of the television series ‘‘Tareky’’ (’‘My Way’’).

In 2016, Sherine collaborated with Hossam Habib on the duet ‘‘Kol Ma Aghanni’’ (’‘Every Time I Sing’’). Her 2018 album ‘‘Nassay’’ (’‘A Person Who Forgets’’) produced several widely viewed tracks, including ‘‘Kazbain’’ (’‘The Liars’’) and ‘‘Al Watar Al Hassas’’ (’‘The Sensitive String’’). She subsequently released successful singles including ‘‘El Hob Khedaa’’ (’‘Love Is a Trick’’) in 2019, ‘‘Mish Qadd Al-Hawa’’ (’‘I Can’t Afford to Love’’) in 2020, and ‘‘Kollaha Ghayrana’’ (’‘All of Them Are Jealous’’) and ‘‘Khasimt Al-Num’’ (’‘I Forgot About Sleep’’) in 2021.

Sherine’s popularity has also extended beyond traditional music charts, with her songs becoming widely used in social-media remixes. In 2023, DJamil’s remixes of her songs attracted tens of millions of views, further demonstrating the enduring popularity of her music among online audiences.

By late 2023 and into 2024, Sherine achieved significant success on the newly launched Billboard Arabia charts. She reached the top of the Billboard Arabia Artist 100 for eight of its first 12 weeks and remained among the top three during the other weeks. Several of her songs also appeared on the Billboard Arabia Hot 100, including ‘‘Kalam Einieh’’ (’‘Words of His Eyes’’), which reached No. 1.

Her continued success led to international recognition when she received the Global Force Award at Billboard’s 2024 Women in Music ceremony. The award recognized her influence and impact as an Arab artist on a global scale. Sherine expressed her happiness at receiving the honor and highlighted the lasting appeal of her music, including among younger listeners and her own daughters.

Her song Sabry Aalil went viral on TikTok in 2024 and later hit over 1000% on Spotify. Her song “Kalam Eineh” also went viral on TikTok and has saw global success, surpassing 214 million streams on Spotify and becoming one of the most streamed Arabic language songs on the platform. The official audio on YouTube has also accumulated 155 million views.

== Acting career ==
Sherine starred opposite to Egypt's comedy star Ahmed Helmy in Mido Mashakel (Arabic: ميدو مشاكل). The 2003 film was directed by Mohamed El-Naggar. In June 2015 she starred in the Ramadan Egyptian series Taree'i (Arabic: طريقي), where she played as Leila, a young lady who struggles to achieve her lifelong dream of becoming a famous singer, against social restriction, regulations and opposition from her family. The drama is written by Tamer Habib and directed by Mohamed Shaker.

== Programmes ==
Sherine was a judge on the show The Voice Ahla Sawt (The voice, Best Voice) until her replacement in 2017.

In January 2017 she hosted her own talk-show, Sherry's Studio (Arabic: شيري ستوديو), on the Egyptian network, DMC.

June 19, 2018 saw her and several celebrities and artists from around the world at the first ever concert in Saudi Arabia at King Abdullah Sports City in Jeddah, after the kingdom's new entertainment laws.

== Controversies ==
In 2017, a video recorded at a concert showed her responding to a song request by joking that drinking from the Nile would give her schistosomiasis when she was asked to sing the song "Mashrebtesh Men Nilha" (Egyptian Arabic: ماشربتش من نيلها; English: didn't you Drink From Its Nile?) at a concert. The Egyptian Musicians Syndicate decided to suspend her right to perform in Egypt over her apparent "unjustified mockery of our dear Egypt" after viewing the video. Sherine later apologized for her "foolish joke" at the concert.

== Awards ==
- Won the 2024 Billboard Arabia - Top Female Artist and also won Top Female Artist – Egyptian Dialect.
- 2025 Best Female Artist in North Africa -AFRIMA Awards.
- First Arab artist to receive the Global Impact Award from the international music platform Billboard.

== Discography ==
=== Albums ===
- Free Mix 3 with Tamer Hosny (2002) Label: Free Music Art Production
- Garh Tany (translation: Another Wound) (2003) Label: Free Music Art Production
- Lazem Ayesh (translation: I have to Live/Survive) (2005) Label: Free Music Art Production
- Batamenak (I'm Reassuring You) (2008) Label: Rotana
- Habeat (I Fell in Love) (2009) Label: Rotana
- Esaal Alaya (Ask About Me) (2012) Label: Rotana
- Ana Kiteer (2014) Label: Nogoum Records
- Taree'i (2015)
- Nassay (2018)
- Btmanna Ansak (2025)

=== Singles ===
- "Ma Sherebtesh Min Nelha" (Egyptian patriotic song)
- "Alachan Masr" ("For Egypt", Egyptian patriotic song)
- "Ma Btefrahsh"
- "Enak"
- "Baladi" ft. Muhammad Noor
- "Just A Dream (Coke Studio/Arabic Version)" [with Nelly]
- "Al'am Al Jadeed" ft. Fadl Shaker
- "Lebnan Fel Alb" (Dedicated for Lebanon during the war)
- "Albi Leek" ft. Hany Shakir
- "Bahibik Ya Omi"
- "Keda Ya Albi"
- "Sida Da"
- "Kol Maghanni"
- "Ayesht Masr" (Egyptian patriotic song)
- "Ala Eidak" (2017)
- "Howa Dah" (2017)
- "Lawany" (2019)
- "Abo El Regala" (2019)
- "El Hob Khedaa" (2019)
- "Mesh Ad El Hawa" (2020)
- "Kollaha Ghayrana" (2021)
- "El Qamas" (2021)
- "Khasemt El Noum" (2021)
- "We Bahleflak" (2021)
- "El 7odn shok" (2026)
- "Teba'an Teba'an" (2026)

Movie and television soundtracks

- "Balak" (2003)
- "Kteer Ben'shaa" (2006)
- "El Meraya" (2008)
- "Masha'er" (2013)
- "Halawat Al Dounia" (2017)
- "Ya Betfaker Ya Bet7es" (2019)
- "Weshy El Ha2i2i" (2021)
- "El Dahab" (2024)
- "Aktar w aktar" (2025)
