= Rotana Music Group =

Music and entertainment company owned by Rotana Group

- Parent company: Rotana Media Group; Warner Music Group (stakeholder)
- Founded: 1987; 39 years ago
- Founder: Nagro Brothers
- Genre: Arabic Music
- Location: Riyadh, Saudi Arabia
- Official website: rotana.net

Rotana Music Group (Arabic: مجموعة روتانا للموسيقى) is a Saudi Arabian record label and the music division of the Rotana Media Group. It is the largest record label and music repertoire holder in the Arab world, and is headquartered in Riyadh, with other branches located in Jeddah, Saudi Arabia, Dubai, Kuwait, Cairo, Egypt and Beirut, Lebanon.

Artists who have released musical works with Rotana include Mohammed Abdu, Abdul Majeed Abdullah, Ahlam, Amr Diab, Elissa, Latifa, Tamer Hosny, Najwa Karam, Saber Rebai, Angham, and Wael Kfoury.

== History ==
Rotana Music Group was established by the Nagro Brothers, Mohammed, Khalid, Waleed, Ahmed and Nezar Nagro in 1987 and was later sold to Saudi billionaire Prince Al Waleed bin Talal.

During the 1990s and 2000s, the label's releases were distributed by EMI Music Arabia. Forbes Middle East included Rotana Music Group's CEO Salem Al Hendi, who first joined in 1995, in their list of "Top Middle Eastern CEOs of 2023", ranking him at 100.

In 2021, Warner Music Group made an investment in Rotana Music. The deal is believed to have been eight figures for a minority stake in the company, and value dthe company at almost $200 million. It was announced on February 16 of the same year that ADA Worldwide, a division of WMG, would distribute Rotana releases outside of MENA via YouTube.

On January 11, 2023, the label signed a licensing deal with social media platform TikTok. It also licensed its music to Spotify, adding 10,000 Arabic songs to the service on January 17. Previously, Deezer exclusively held the rights to the label's songs.

On March 12, 2024, music streaming service Anghami and Rotana Music Group extended their partnership for three more years. Instead of only obtaining access to Rotana's music catalogue, they expanded into concerts and collaborations.

== Notable artists ==
=== Current ===
- Ahlam
- Amal Maher
- Angham
- Arwa
- Assala
- Asma Lamnawar
- Ayman Alatar
- Dalia Mubarak
- Diana Haddad
- Esraa Alaseel
- George Wassouf
- Ibtissam Tiskat
- Jamilla
- Jannat
- Latifa
- Maher Zain
- Majid Al Mohandis
- Mesut Kurtis
- Mohamed Ramadan
- Najwa Karam
- Nawal El Kuwaiti
- Nawal Al Zoghbi
- Saber Rebai
- Shatha Hassoun
- Shayma Helali
- Sandy
- Sherine
- Siti Nurhaliza (2024–present)
- Tamer Hosny
- Waed

=== Previous ===
- Abdallah Al Rowaished
- Amal Hijazi
- Amr Diab
- Balqees Ahmed Fathi
- Bashar Al Shatty
- Bassima
- Carole Samaha
- Cyrine Abdelnour
- Dina Hayek
- Elissa
- Fadel Shaker
- Fares Karam
- Fulla
- Hatem Al Iraqi
- Haifa Wehbe
- Hind
- Hoda Saad
- Hussain Al Jassmi
- Kadim Al Sahir
- Khaled El Ghandour
- Laila Ghofran
- Mai Selim
- Maritta Hallani
- Marwan Khoury
- Maya Nasri
- Melhem Zein
- Mohamed Mounir
- Pascale Machaalani
- Rajaa Kasbani
- Ramy Ayach
- Rida Al Abdullah
- Samira Said
- Sherine Wagdy
- Suzanne Tamim
- Tamer Ashour
- The 4 Cats
- Thekra
- Wael Kfoury
- Walid Toufic
- Yasmine Niazy
- ZeeZee

== See also ==
- Lists of record labels
