= Jamal Yassine =

Labanese-Egyptian singer and composer

Jamal Yassine جمال ياسين
- Genres: Egyptian music, Arabic pop music, Pop
- Occupations: singer, composer, music producer
- Labels: Arabica Music
- Website: jmlysn.com

Jamal Yassine (Arabic: جمال ياسين) is a Lebanese-Egyptian composer, music producer and singer. He is currently the general manager of Arabica Music record label. Yassine has worked with several artists and musicians including, Elissa, Saber Rebaï, Wael Kfoury, Saad Lamjarred, Joseph Attieh, Muhammad EL Majzoub, Ibrahim El Hakami, Brigitte Yaghi and Maritta Hallani.

== Career ==
Yassine's interest in music began when he was 6, and started singing while he was at school for fun and decided later to sing professionally after receiving praise from his peers for his voice. During his career, he learned to play guitar and piano.

In 2010, Yassine collaborated with several musicians including Ayman Bahgat Kamar, Amir Teima, Nizar Francis, Samir Sfeir, Walid Saad and Amr Mostafa, and released his debut album Betnassiny Hayati via the record label Arabica Music.

In January 2021, Yassine collaborated with Joseph Attieh and produced Tabii, which peaked at the top of the Khaliji music in Lebanon, Palestine, Iraq, the Gulf, Syria and Yemen on Anghami and YouTube in Lebanon for 3 months. In May 2021, Yassine composed Wael Kfoury's Kelna Mnenjar, the theme song of the TV series Downtown which peaked at #1 on YouTube within a few days of releasing the song. In April 2022, Yassine teamed up with Saad Lamjarred and produced nasheed style song Al Tawba, the song peaked at #1 on YouTube.

== Discography ==
=== Albums ===
- 2010: Betnassiny Hayati - singer

=== Singles ===
As a composer / music producer

- 2022: Wahdani, Joseph Attieh
- 2022: Kan Bena Kteer, Brigitte Yaghi
- 2022: Al Tawba, Saad Lamjarred
- 2021: Tabii, Joseph Attieh
- 2021: Kelna Mnenjar, Wael Kfoury
- 2021: Mnehkom 3al Nas, Joseph Attieh
- 2021: Kanoun El Hayat, Farah Nakhoul
- 2021: Melh W Dab, Hussein El Salman
- 2021: Khoun, Scenario
- 2020: Wafy, Elissa
- 2020: Mashi, Jad Shwery ft. Jamal Yassine & Rami Chalhoub
- 2020: El Essa Kella, Kosai Khauli ft. Ismaeil Tamr
- 2020: Oudi, Ismaeil Tamr
- 2020: Khod El Nas, Abbas Jaafar
- 2022: Haydi Halti, Mohamed El Majzoub
- 2020: Ammo, Ammo Fahd
- 2020: Rassi Baalbaki, Abbas Jaafar
- 2020: Baleez, La, K, CatShi
- 2020: Waat El Jad, Raphael Jabbour
- 2019: Sdomni Bi Shi, Reem El Sharif
- 2018: Akher Hami, Ibrahim El Hakami
- 2018: Tahiyaty, Ibrahim El Hakami
- 2018: Abel Ba2a, Ibrahim El Hakami
- 2018: Sama3ouh, Ibrahim El Hakami
- 2017: Shta2telik, Ibrahim El Hakami

As singer

- 2017: Bashouf Feeki
- 2016: Masdoum Atefiyan
- 2010: Betnassiny Hayati
- 2010: Ana Mestani Aleik
- 2009: Lw 2olt Bahebak
