= Charif =

Charif (Arabic: شريف) is both a surname and a given name and can be spelled either "Charif" or "Sharif". Notable people with the name include:

- Gustavo Charif (born 1966), Argentine artist
- Maher Charif, Palestinian Marxist historian
- Moeen Charif (born 1972), Lebanese singer
- Omar Sharif (1932–2015), Egyptian-American Hollywood actor
- Charif Souki (born 1953), Egyptian-born American businessman
- Charif Megarbane (born 1984), Lebanese musician
