= Rouwaida Attieh =

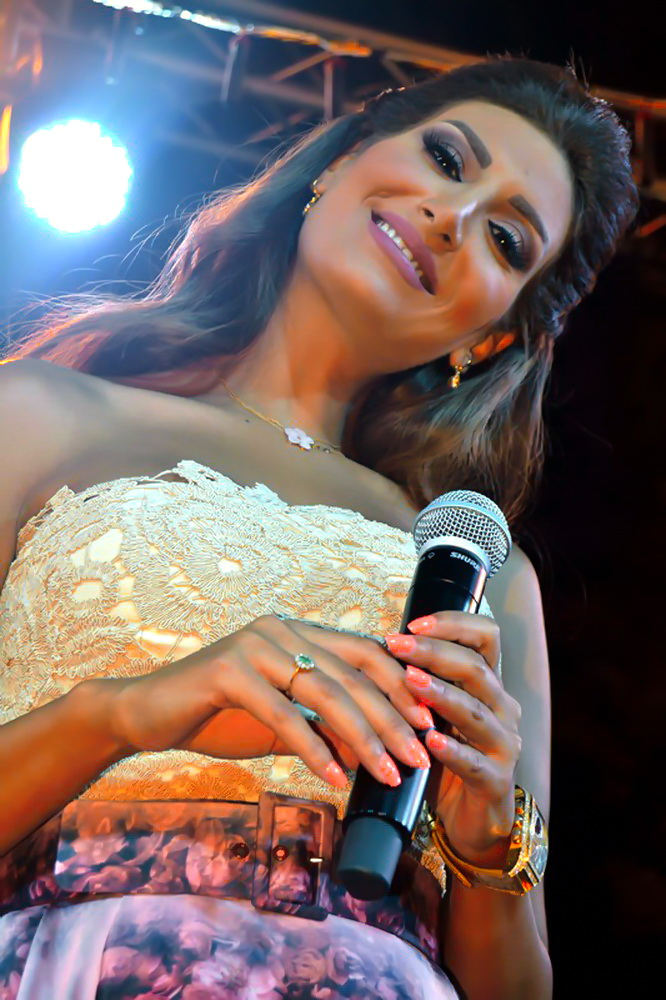
- Attieh in 2015

Background information
- Born: Obayda Haidar Attieh عبيدة حيدر عطية; July 1, 1982 (age 43)
- Origin: Talkalakh, Syria
- Years active: 2003–present
- Labels: AlAnoud Production

Rouwaida Attieh (Arabic: رويدا عطية; born July 1, 1982) is a Syrian vocalist. Rouwaida was the first runner-up on the first season of Super Star, the pan-Arab import of "Pop Idol". Along with Lebanese contestant Melhem Zein, she was a favourite to win the contest, which was won by Jordanian contestant Diana Karazon. She was signed under AlAnoud Productions.

== Biography ==
Rouwaida was born in Talkalakh, Syria. She is the daughter of Haydar and Najida Attieh. Her father was a Syrian born and grew up in Tripoli, Lebanon, where he studied and graduated from High School. He met Rouwaida's mother Najida when he moved to Egypt to specialize in law. The couple married and came back to Lebanon, where Najida was born.

In 2008, She signed with Alanoud Production which is managed by Anoud Maaliki and released her first album with the label “Essmani” which was distributed by Platinum Records. The album included the two hit singles “Shou Sahel El Hali”, “Hayati Melkite” and “Bala Hob”.

In 2003 Rouwaida participated in Super Star 1, she reached the finals.
