= Maria Nalbandian =

Maria Nalbandian Arabic: ماريا نالبنديان Armenian: Մարիա Նալպանտեան
- Also known as: Maria
- Born: August 1, 1985 (age 40)
- Origin: Beirut, Lebanon
- Genres: Pop; World; Arabic; Armenian
- Occupations: Singer, actress
- Years active: 2003–present
- Website: Official Website

Maria Nalbandian (Armenian: Մարիա Նալպանտեան; Arabic: ماريا نالبنديان, born August 1, 1985), also known as Maria (Arabic: ماريا), is an Armenian-Lebanese singer from Beirut.

== Biography ==
Nalbandian was born to Armenian parents. She studied Business Marketing. She won the Miss Bikini Asia 2002 in Malta aged 17. She speaks Armenian, Arabic, and English. Her music videos include "Elaab" and "Bahebbak Add Eih" both directed by Jad Shwery. In 2008 she starred in the movies Bedoon Raqaba, and Ahasees. In 2015 she made her first Armenian album "Mi Eraz" (A Dream) and she won Top Beautiful Armenian Woman World Wide and Best Showbiz Star 2015.

== Discography ==
=== Albums ===
Elaab (2005)

No.	Title	Lyrics	Music	Producer	Length
1.	"Elaab" (Play)	Hany Al-Sagheer	Mohamed Raheem	Mohamed Raheem
2.	"Balash Te'olly" (Don't Tell Me)
3.	"3andak Shi" (You Have Something)
4.	"Tekzeb Alayya" (You Lie to Me)	Talal Qentar	Talal Qentar	Firas Shateela
5.	"Eih Wallah"
6.	"Bahebbak Add Eih" (How Much I Love You)	Hany Abd Al-Kareem	Sileem Salama	Tony Saba
7.	"Aywa Ya Seedi"
8.	"Ya Maria" (O Maria!)
9.	"Elaab (Radio Mix)"	Hany Al-Sagheer	Mohamed Raheem	Mohamed Raheem

We Regeat Tany (2007)

No.	Title	Lyrics	Music	Producer	Length
1.	"Stop, Taala Bass" (Stop, Just Come)	Omar Sary	Bashar Ghazawy	Tony Abu Khaleel, Mohamed Kaby	3:22
2.	"Tehayelny"				3:35
3.	"La'etein"				4:59
4.	"Boos Eedak"				3:35
5.	"Bekhatrak"				3:31
6.	"We Regeat Tany" (And I'm Back Again)	Muneer Abu Assaf	Zaher Al-Baba	Mohamed Kaby	3:35
7.	"Nefertiti" (Nefertiti)				3:59
8.	"Ya Waheshny" (Hey You, Whom I Miss)				4:09
9.	"Ourestoun"				3:38
10.	"Tak Dom"				3:40

Mi Eraz (2015)

No.	Title	Length
1.	"Mi Eraz" (A Dream)
2.	"Shnorhavor" (Happy Birthday)
3.	"Elek Hayer" (Rise Armenians)
4.	"Inc Moracir" (Forget Me)
5.	"Ser Chega" (No Love)
6.	"Chem Neri" (Would Not Forgive)
7.	"Harsi Namage" (Bride Message)
8.	"De Kena" (Go Away)

=== Other Songs ===
Year	Title	Lyrics	Music	Producer
	"Bahebb El Mas" (I Love Diamond)	Haytham Shaaban	Iwan	Wesam Ghazawy
2009	"Einak Fe Einy" (featuring Ahmed Fahmy)	Mustafa Bakry	Shireef Ismail	
2013	"Djane Djan"			
2013	"Dzap Dzap"			
2014	"Nadran Alayya" (I Vow)	Khalid Muneer	Mohamed Raheem	Mohamed Raheem
2015	"Azks Hayoc"			

== Videography ==
=== Music Videos ===
Year	Title	Album	Director
2004	"Elaab" (Play)	Elaab	Jad Shwery
2005	"Tekzeb Alayya" (You Lie to Me)	Elaab	Jad Shwery
2005	"Bahebbak Add Eih" (How Much I Love You)	Elaab	Jad Shwery
2007	"We Regeat Tany / Stop, Taala Bass" (And I'm Back Again / Stop, Just Come)	We Regeat Tany	Jad Shwery
2008	"Bahebb El Mas" (I Love Diamond)		Jad Shwery
2009	"Einak Fe Einy" (featuring Ahmed Fahmy)	Bedoon Raqaba [Movie]	Hany Gerges Fawzy
2013	"Djane Djan"		Sherif Tarhini
2014	"De Kena"	Mi Eraz	Aramayis Hayrapetyan
2014	"Nadran Alayya" (I Vow)		Robert Cremona
2015	"Mi Eraz" (A Dream)	Mi Eraz	
2015	"Shnorhavor" (Happy Birthday)	Mi Eraz	Ramy Nabha

=== Filmography ===
Year	Title	Role	Notes
2009	Bedoon Raqaba		
2010	Ahasees		

=== Television Programs ===
Year	Title	Role	Notes
	Sahra Ma3 Negm	Herself (guest)	Interview

=== Commercials ===
Year	Product	Notes
	Fem	

Year	Product	Notes
	Mahmoud Saaid	Exiting by Maria Parfume

== Beauty contests ==
Year	Title	Result
2002	Miss Bikini Asia	Won

Year	Title	Result
2015	Top Beautiful Armenian Woman	Won
