= Ammar Hassan =

Palestinian musician

Ammar Hassan عمار حسن
- Born: Ammar Hassan Ahmed ad-Daqrouq عمار حسن أحمد الدقروق; 13 November 1976 (age 49); Kuwait
- Origin: Palestine
- Genres: Palestinian, Arabic Music
- Occupation: Singer

Ammar Hassan (Arabic: عمار حسن; born 13 November 1976) is a Palestinian singer who rose to popularity around the Arab world after placing second in Super Star 2, the pan-Arabic version of Pop Idol.

== Super Star Performances ==
Top 81: يابني (Yabni) by
Top 17: ما بيسألش عليا ( fujdeldhbdewhwvvrv Ma Bisalshi Aleya)
Top 13: الله معك (Allah Ma'ak)
Top 15: على بابي واقف قمرين (Ala Babi Wakef Amarein)
Top 11: خطرنا على بالك (Khatarna Ala Balak)
Top 10: بعيد عنك (Ba'id Anak)
Top 9: عاللي جرى (Alli Jara)
Top 9: ليلة (Leila)
Top 7: جيت بوقتك (Jeet Ba'waqtak) by Melhem Barakat
Top 7: بحبك وبغار (Bahibak W Bghar) by Assi El Helani
Top 6: دوّبني الهوى (Dawabni El Hawa) by Ghassan Saliba
Top 6: دارت الأيام (Darat Alayam)
Top 5: يا مارق عالطواحين (Ya Mareq Al Tawaheen) by Nasri Chamssedine
Top 5: زهرة المدائن (Zahret El Mada'en)
Top 4: الطربوش (El Tarboush)
Top 4: عز الحبايب (Az El Habaib) by Saber El Rebai
Top 4: طلوا حبابنا (Taloua Hababna)
Top 3: اللي نساك (Elli Nesak) by Abdallah El Rowaished
Top 3: (Wenka Aleya)
Top 3: ياللي تعبنا (Yalli Ta'abna)
Grand Final: أي دمعة حزن (Aya Dam'et Hozen)
Grand Final: جفنه (Jafnoho)
Grand Final: هوى يا هوى (Hawa Ya Hawa)

== Discography ==
- Super Stars '05 – Wibtada El Mishwar
- Ammar Hassan – Helm Kbir
