= Liliane Landor =

Lebanese-born British television journalist (born 1956)

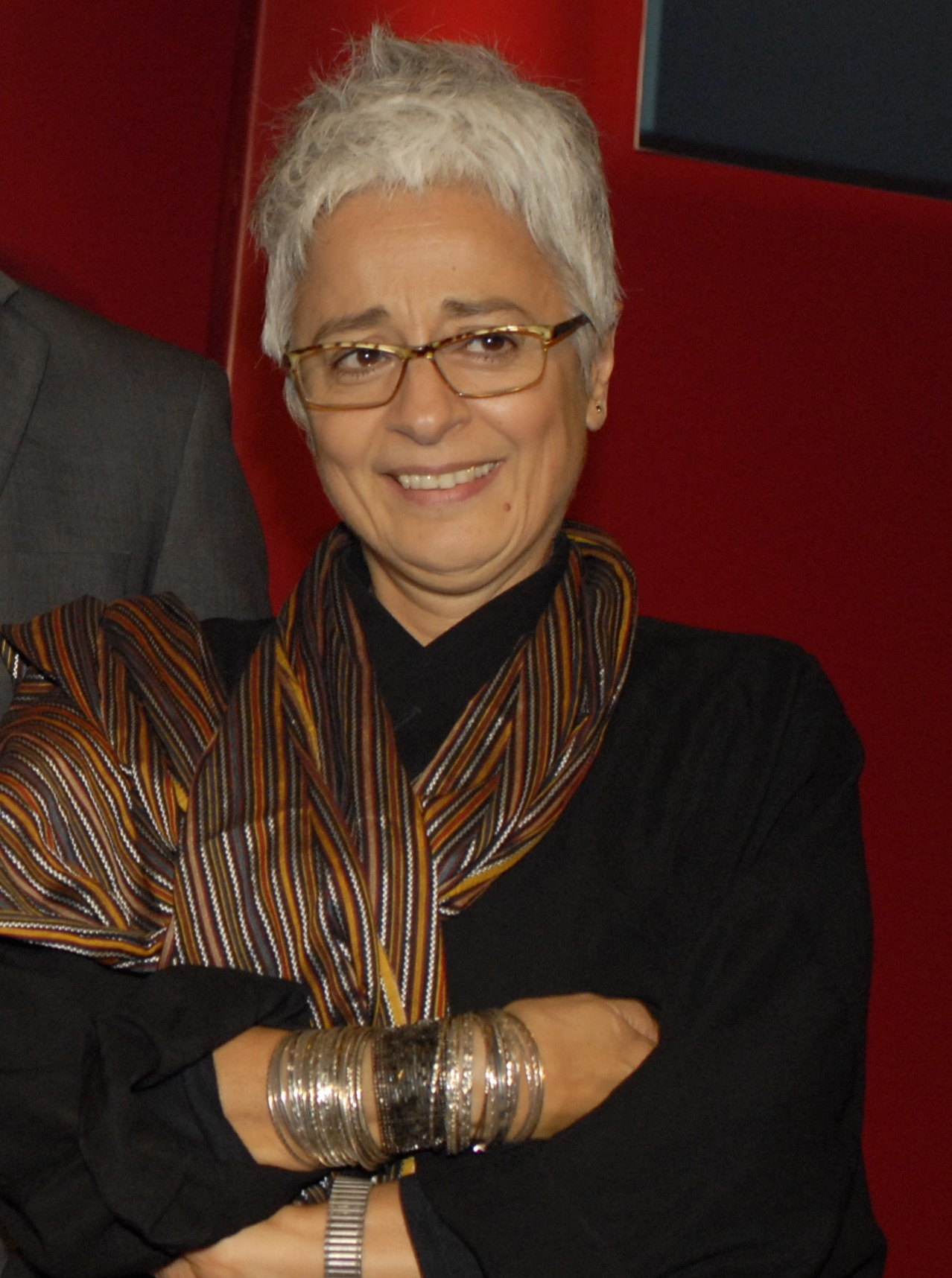
- Landor in 2007
- Born: Lebanon
- Education: France and Switzerland
- Known for: creating BBC 100 Women

Liliane Landor (born 1956) is a Lebanese-born British journalist and broadcasting executive who worked as the Director of the BBC World Service from 2021 until 2024. She worked for the BBC from 1989 to mid-2016, becoming controller for languages at the Service, where she was responsible for radio and television broadcasting in 27 languages. She launched the BBC's 100 Women project in 2014. In November 2016, she was included as one of the inspirational and influential women of 2016 in the BBC's 100 Women — the theme was "defiance".

== Biography ==
The daughter of a Lebanese father and a Cuban mother, Landor was born and raised in Lebanon. She was educated in France and Switzerland and she can speak five languages. On joining the BBC in 1989, she first worked for the French service, presenting a news programme. She went on to become one of the first non-British broadcasters in the news department of the BBC World Service, where she presented Europe Today and, two years later, the flagship Newshour. She was one of the main presenters of The World Today, before becoming the programme's editor.

In 2002, Landor was appointed senior editor of news and current affairs programmes, a department she headed from 2006, gaining responsibility for all World Service English-language news programmes. In 2007 she was one of the judges in the BBC's NewsMaker journalism competition opened to anyone who was between the age of 20 and 30. The entries had to be in English and they were judged by Rania Kurdi, Lyse Doucet and Landor. The winners from Jordan were Lina Ejeilat and Iraqi engineer Sarah Muthanna.

In late 2009, Landor moved to the Middle East department of the World Service, with editorial and management responsibilities for all Arabic television and radio broadcasts. In 2013, she became the controller responsible for the BBC World Service's radio and television broadcasting in 27 languages, until her departure in mid-2016. It was Landor who was instrumental in launching the BBC's 100 Women in 2014, in which was included Malala Yousafzai, the Pakistani schoolgirl who was shot by the Taliban.

Landor appreciates the importance of combining radio and television broadcasting with online services including social media. In a 2014 interview with Hanin Ghaddar of NOW News, she stressed the importance of maintaining high-quality news while exploring new possibilities for more effective delivery. The BBC's "impartiality, objectivity, and universal values will not change," she explained. "There are so many ways to get through to audiences, but ultimately you have certain editorial principles that you cannot waive."

On Landor's departure in 2016, the director of BBC News, James Harding, described her as "a defining figure in shaping the World Service" who through the language services had "transformed the BBC’s ability to make sense of the world". The following year, the BBC announced the "Liliane Landor Award for Best in Journalism" for a documentary non-fiction work. The first award was won by Karim Sayad for a film about the lives of two Algerian men.

In 2018, Landor became Head of Foreign News for Channel 4, succeeding Nevine Mabro. From 2021 until 2024, Landor was the Senior Controller of BBC News International Services (under which she also assumed the role of Director for international broadcaster BBC World Service).

In September 2022, Landor started a restructuring programme to cut about 380 jobs at the BBC World Service and close some radio operations, prompting warnings of damage to the BBC's global reputation. Some critics argued that the cuts would mean poorer value for British and global audiences.

In 2025, having left the BBC she spoke out against proposals to fund the BBC World Service from the defence budget. She believed that this would undermine its independence.
