= SuperStar (Arabic TV series) =

Arabic television series

- Arabic: سوبر ستار
- Created by: Simon Fuller
- Directed by: Nasser Fakih & Salam El Zaatari
- Presented by: Rania Kurdi (Season 1 To 2); Ayman Kaissouni (Season 1 To 4); Heba El-Sisy (Season 3 Only) Majdala Khattar (Season 5); Wael Mansour (Season 5)
- Judges: Elias Rahbani (Season 1 To 5); Abdullah Al-Qoud (Season 1 To 5); Tonia Moreeb (Season 1 Only); Fadia Tanb Al-Hajj ( Season 2 To 4); Ziad Boutros (Season 3 To 5); Gehan Al-Nasser (Season 5 Only)
- Country of origin: Arab world
- No. of seasons: 5

Production
- Running time: Varies

Original release
- Network: Future Television
- Release: 20 April 2003 – 24 July 2008

SuperStar (Arabic: سوبر ستار) is an Arabic television show based on the British show Pop Idol created by Simon Fuller's 19 Entertainment & developed by Fremantle Media. The show unites the Arab community by democratically choosing the next singing sensation. The show is broadcast worldwide on Future TV, a Lebanese television station. It was also the first Idol franchise to feature contestants from multiple countries.

The show was a huge success. Ali Jaber, the executive manager of Future TV, was quoted as saying "This (program) is the most successful for an Arab television. There isn't a television program that moved the Arab world like that."

However, SuperStar was eclipsed by rival show Star Academy on LBC in the Middle East, in terms of popularity and ratings, after only its first season. It has been surpassed by Star Academy as the number one Arab show, and did not move the Arab world the way it did during the first season.

Future TV subsequently lost the Idol licence to the MBC network, which on 9 December 2011 relaunched the programme after changing its name to Arab Idol on MBC 1.

== Summary ==
Season	Year	Winner	Country	Runner-up	Country	Third Place	Country	Fourth Place	Country
1	2003	Diana Karazon	Jordan	Rouwaida Attieh	Syria	Melhem Zein	Lebanon	Saoud Abou Sultan	United Arab Emirates
2	2004	Ayman Alatar	Libya	Ammar Hassan	Palestine	Hadi Aswad	Syria	Ranim Qteit	Egypt
3	2005– 2006	Ibrahim El Hakami	Saudi Arabia	Shahd Barmada	Syria	Ayman Lseeq	Tunisia	Ahmed El Faleh	Iraq
4	2007	Marwan Ali	Tunisia	Saad Lamjarred	Morocco	Yosra Mahnouch	Tunisia	Ahmed Hussein	Lebanon
5	2008	Elie Bitar	Lebanon	Abdel Majid Ibrahim	Saudi Arabia	Murad El Swaiti	Palestine	Asma El Jaberi	Morocco

== SuperStar 1 (2003) ==
The first series aired between 20 April 2003 and 18 August 2003. The series was won by Jordanian Diana Karazon.

=== Participants and special guests ===
Participants and date of elimination:

- Diana Karazon – Jordan – Winner
- Rouwaida Attieh – Syria – 18 August 2003
- Melhem Zein – Lebanon – 11 August 2003
- Saoud Abou Sultan UAE – 4 August 2003
- Wael Mansour – Egypt – 28 July 2003
- Shadi Aswad – Syria – 21 July 2003
- Merhi Serhal – Lebanon – 14 July 2003
- Mohammad Lafi – Palestine – 7 July 2003
- Nancy Zabalawi – Syria – 30 June 2003
- Saber Hawari – Algeria – 30 June 2003
- Saad Jamal Al-Dine – Lebanon – 23 June 2003
- Haitham Saeed – Egypt – 23 June 2003

Special Guests:

- Ragheb Alama
- Walid Toufic
- Sabah Fakhri
- Saber Rebai
- James Pitman

=== Diana Karazon in World Idol ===
Diana Karazon participated alongside 10 other Idol winners from other countries in the mini-event World Idol held in London, known locally as "سوبر ستار العالم", 'World Superstar'. Diana placed equal in 9th place among the 11 contestants equal with the German SuperStar Alexander Klaws on 45 points. The event was won by the Norwegian Idol, Kurt Nilsen.

Diana Karazon performed the first radio single from her CD Super Star El Arab – Ensani Ma Binsak.

Diana Karazon received the following scores respectively:

- United Kingdom awarded 4 points
- Belgium awarded 1 point
- Australia awarded 4 points
- United States awarded 8 points
- Arab world awarded 12 points (default award)
- Poland awarded 1 point
- Netherlands awarded 1 point
- Canada awarded 5 points
- Germany awarded 6 points
- Norway awarded 2 points
- South Africa awarded 1 point

== SuperStar 2 (2004) ==
The second series aired between 21 April and 23 August 2004. Paris and Bahrain were newly added as audition cities while Algiers was dropped. Tonia Moreeb decided to quit after receiving bad comments about her judging skills in the previous season. She was replaced with music critic/agent Fadia Tanab. 83 contestants had advanced to the semi-finals of SuperStar 2, 81 ended up performing before 2 contestants each week would advance to become part of the Top 14 contestants. This series also offered a Wildcard show where it was revealed by the CEO of Future TV – Ali Jaber, that the Top 14 would become a Top 17 & that the Top 5 vote getters in the Wildcards would advance.

Ayman Alatar from Janzour, Libya won the second season on 23 August 2004, beating runner up Palestinian Ammar Hassan with a weighting of 54% to 46%.

It was revealed later that Ayman had missed the audition in Cairo, Egypt by one day & had one last chance to audition in Damascus, Syria.

=== Participants and special guests ===
Participants, their countries and date of elimination

- Ayman Alatar – Libya – Winner
- Ammar Hassan – Palestine – 23 August 2004
- Hadi Aswad – Syria – 16 August 2004
- Ranim Qteit – Egypt – 9 August 2004
- Brigitte Yaghi – Lebanon – 2 August 2004
- Mohannad Mshallah – Syria – 26 July 2004
- Houssam Madanieh – Syria – 19 July 2004
- Abeer Nehme – Lebanon – 12 July 2004
- Abdulrahman Mohammed – Saudi Arabia – 12 July 2004
- Houssam Shami – Lebanon – 28 June 2004
- Mohamed Daoud – Kuwait – 21 June 2004
- Waad Al Bahri – Syria – 14 June 2004
- Mustafa Shwiekh – Egypt – 14 June 2004
- Raneen El Shaar – Lebanon – 7 June 2004
- Zahi Saffeyeh – Lebanon – 7 June 2004
- Rania Shaban – UAE – 31 May 2004
- Yasmine El Husaini – Egypt – 31 May 2004

Special guests:

- Wadih El Safi
- Diana Karazon
- Rouwaida Attieh
- Melhem Zein
- Saoud Abou Sultan
- Asalah Nasri
- Nawal El Kuwaiti
- Sherine
- Diana Haddad
- The Judges Including: Elias Rahbani, Abdullah Al Qoud, and Fadia Tanb Al-Hajj
- Nancy Ajram
- Moeen Charif
- Assi El Helani

== SuperStar 3 (2005–2006) ==
SuperStar 3 was the longest Idol production ever with auditions beginning in Cairo on 10 November 2004, telecasts starting on 11 October 2005 and the program culminating on 6 February 2006.

The telecast of SuperStar 3 was delayed after the assassination of Future TV founder & Lebanese Prime Minister – Rafik Hariri, as the TV station went into mourning.

Rania Kurdi did not want to renew her hosting position for Season 3, as a result Heba Sisi was hired for Season 3, but due to the lengthy hiatus over the Hariri murder, her contract prematurely ended before the semi-finals had begun, leaving Ayman to host solo for the rest of the season.

Auditions took place in the following cities:

- Beirut, Lebanon
- Damascus, Syria
- Tunis, Tunisia
- Dubai, United Arab Emirates
- Cairo, Egypt
- Amman, Jordan
- Sydney, Australia
- Los Angeles, USA

=== Participants and special guests ===
94 contestants advanced to the theatre round in Beirut. 6 from America, 4 from Australia, 21 from Lebanon, 8 from Egypt, 5 from Jordan, 9 from Syria, 32 from Tunisia & 5 from UAE.

Participants, their countries of origin and date of elimination:

- Ibrahim El Hakami – Saudi Arabia – Winner
- Shahd Barmada – Syria – 6 February 2006
- Ayman Lseeq – Tunisia – 30 January 2006
- Ahmed El Faleh – Iraq – 23 January 2006
- Asma Othmani – Tunisia – 23 January 2006
- Nancy Nasrallah – Lebanon – 9 January 2006
- Haitham El Shoumali – Palestine – 2 January 2006
- Ibrahim Abd El Adheem – Libya – 26 December 2005
- Asma Ben Ahmed – Tunisia – 19 December 2005
- Hatem Adar – Morocco – 19 December 2005
- Samar Andeel – Egypt – 5 December 2005
- Yusra Hamzawi – Tunisia – 28 November 2005

The special guests were: Once again this season, special musical guests have been invited to the show to offer their support & critiques.

- Ayman Alatar
- Ammar Hassan
- Hadi Aswad
- Ranim Qteit
- Tony Hana
- Abdallah Al Rowaished
- Walid Toufic
- Marwan Khoury
- Nabil Shaeil
- Lotfi Boushnaq
- Talal Salamah
- Julia Boutros
- Nancy Ajram

The new semi final format from Denmark & America was similarly adopted this season whereby the Top 21 (10 male & 11 female) were placed in male & female groups with 5 contestants advancing to the Top 12.

The semi finalists of SuperStar 3 are:
Samar Andeel (Egypt), Aida El Rahbani (Lebanon), Nancy Nasrallah (Lebanon), Rashel El Rasi (Lebanon), Hasna Zlagh (Morocco), Shahd Barmada (Syria), Asma Ben Ahmed (Tunisia), Asma Othmani (Tunisia), Fouzia El Betri (Tunisia), Olfa El Barhoumi (Tunisia), Yusra Hamzawi (Tunisia), Mohamed El Abd (Egypt), Mohamed Jamal (Egypt), Ahmed El Faleh (Iraq), Youssef Kazar (Iraq), Ibrahim Abd El Adheem (Libya), Hatem Adar (Morocco), Haitham El Shoumali (Palestine), Ibrahim El Hakami (Saudi Arabia), Anis Ltaief (Tunisia), Ayman Lseeq (Tunisia)

As of 12 December 2005, the competition of SuperStar has been delayed due to the assassination of Lebanese senator Gebran Tueni, the results show scheduled to air on Monday 12 December 2005 will be included with the results due on Monday 19 December 2005.

On 15 January 2006, the competition was once again postponed due to the passing of another key political figure, Jaber Al-Ahmad Al-Jaber Al-Sabah. The performance show was recorded on Tuesday & aired on Thursday 19 January. The votes from this round will be combined with the performance show on 22 January with the elimination of 2 contestants.

On the evening of Monday 6 February 2006, Ibrahim El Hakami from Saudi Arabia became the 3rd SuperStar over Shahd Barmada with a 53% to 47% weighting. Along with the title of SuperStar, Ibrahim also won a Ford Focus.

=== Finals elimination chart ===
Stage:		Semi-finals			Finals								
Weeks:		11/07	11/14	11/21	11/28	12/05	12/19	12/26	01/02	01/09	01/23	01/30	02/06
Place	Contestant	Result											
1	Ibrahim El Hakami		IN			Btm4		Btm3	Btm2				Winner
2	Shahd Barmada	IN							Btm3		Btm3		Runner-up
3	Ayman Lseeq		IN							Btm3		Elim	
4-5	Ahmed El Faleh		IN			Btm2					Elim		
4-5	Asma Othmani	Elim		WC				Btm2		Btm2	Elim		
6	Nancy Nasrallah	IN						Btm4		Elim			
7	Haitham El Shoumali		IN						Elim				
8	Ibrahim Abd El Adheem		Elim	WC				Elim					
9-10	Hatem Adar		IN				Elim						
9-10	Asma Ben Ahmed	IN				Btm3	Elim						
11	Samar Andeel	IN				Elim							
12	Yusra Hamzawi	IN			Elim								

Legend
Female	Male	Safe	Safe first	Safe second	Safe third	Eliminated	Wildcard

== SuperStar 4 (2007) ==
The fourth series aired between 22 January 2007 and 4 June 2007. The performance show airs on Sunday night with the results show on Monday night.

Season 4 of SuperStar was officially confirmed of the season 3 Grand Final.

On 10 April 2006, the following audition cities were revealed on the official Future TV website and took place in September 2006:

- Beirut, Lebanon
- Cairo, Egypt
- Amman, Jordan
- Tunis, Tunisia
- Kuwait City, Kuwait
- Dubai, United Arab Emirates
- Montreal, Quebec, Canada
- Los Angeles, USA
- Detroit, USA

(São Paulo, Brazil was to be included but scrapped at the last minute)

=== Participants and special guests ===
107 contestants advanced to the theatre round in Beirut. 8 from America, 5 from Canada, 36 from Lebanon, 11 from Egypt, 8 from Jordan, 5 from Kuwait, 31 from Tunisia & 3 from UAE.

Participants, their countries of origin and date of elimination

- Marwan Ali – Tunisia – Winner
- Saad Lamjarred – Morocco – 4 June 2007
- Yosra Mahnouch – Tunisia – 28 May 2007
- Ahmed Hussein – Lebanon – 14 May 2007
- Rihab Saleh – Egypt – 7 May 2007
- Ibrahim Ashri – Egypt – 30 April 2007
- Fadi Abd El Khaliq – Lebanon – 23 April 2007
- Nesma Kurdi – Egypt – 23 April 2007
- Youssef Bara – Syria – 9 April 2007
- Mustafa Said – Egypt – 2 April 2007
- Rawda Bin Abdallah – Tunisia – 26 March 2007
- Elian Ba'ini – Lebanon – 19 March 2007
- Nada Omar – Egypt – 19 March 2007

Special Guests:

- Mayada El Hennawy
- Ibrahim El Hakami
- Wadih El Safi
- Brigitte Yaghi
- Hani Shaker
- Melhem Zein
- Sabah Fakhry
- Carole Samaha
- Ehab Tawfik
- Assi El Helani

The new semi final format was similarly adopted this season whereby the Top 22 (12 male & 10 female) were placed in male & female groups with 5 contestants advancing to the Top 13.

The semi finalists of SuperStar 4 are: Yosra Mahnouch (Tunisia), Mirai Zahab (Lebanon), Selwa El Ghali (Egypt)، Elian Ba'ini (Lebanon), Sawsan Najar (Iraq), Nada Omar (Egypt), Rawda Bin Abdallah (Tunisia), Nesma Kurdi (Egypt), Rihab Saleh (Egypt), Hoba Biba (Tunisia), Fadi Abd El Khaliq (Lebanon), Mustafa Said (Egypt), Marwan Ali (Tunisia), Youssef Bara (Syria), Ahmed Hussein (Lebanon), Wael Atallah (Libya), Yazid El Maghribi (Saudi Arabia), Salah El Kurdi (Lebanon), Tawfik Kelesh (Lebanon), Fouaz Hadchiti (Lebanon), Saad Lamjarred (Morocco), Ibrahim Ashri, (Egypt)

=== Finals elimination chart ===
Stage:		Semi-finals			Finals										
Weeks:		02/28	03/05	03/12	03/19	03/26	04/02	04/09	04/16	04/23	04/30	05/07	05/14	05/28	06/06
Place	Contestant	Result													
1	Marwan Ali		Elim	WC				Btm4							Winner
2	Saad Lamjarred		IN									Btm3			Runner-up
3	Yusra Mahnoush	IN			Btm5					Btm4				Elim	
4	Ahmad Hussein		IN			Btm4				Btm3	Btm2	Btm2	Elim		
5	Rihab Saleh	IN					Btm4		Elim		Btm3	Elim			
6	Ibrahim Ashri		Elim	WC		Btm2	Btm2	Btm2	Btm2		Elim				
7-8	Nesma Kurdi	IN					Btm3	Btm4	Btm3	Elim					
7-8	Fadi Abd El Khaliq		IN		Btm3					Elim					
9	Youssef Bara		IN		Btm5	Btm2		Elim							
10	Mustafa Said		IN			Btm4	Elim								
11	Rawda Bin Abdallah	Elim		WC		Elim									
12-13	Elian Ba'ini	IN			Elim										
12-13	Nada Omar	IN			Elim										

- On 26 March Rehab Saleh was originally eliminated but brought back by the judges and again eliminated on 7 May.

Legend
Female	Male	Safe	Safe first	Safe second	Safe third	Eliminated	Wildcard

== SuperStar 5 (2008) ==
The fifth series aired between 24 February 2008 and 24 July 2008. There were 3 big changes:

- New female judge Gehan Al-Nasser replacing Fadia Tanb Al-Hajj who judged the 2nd, 3rd, and 4th season
- Wael Mansour (former finalist from SuperStar 2003) & Majdala Khatar now replace Ayman Qaissouni who hosted the first 4 seasons and moved onto another project.
- Results are no longer given on Mondays, they are on Thursdays giving people 5 days to vote

Auditions took place in the following cities:

- Beqaa Valley, Lebanon
- Tripoli, Lebanon
- Cairo, Egypt
- Amman, Jordan
- Tunis, Tunisia
- Baghdad, Iraq
- Kuwait City, Kuwait
- Manama, Bahrain
- Casablanca, Morocco

This year's Top 20 featured 9 females and 11 males. The Top 9 females performed on 6 April and Top 11 males performed on 13 April. 10 were chosen, and 9 of the remaining 10 came back for a Last Chance show on 20 April. One of the girls chose to drop out of the competition but did not state a reason. The Top 12 was completed on 24 April.

Future Television was forced into closing on 9 May, during the 2008 Lebanon conflict. After moving its broadcasting headquarters, the station was back on the air on 13 May at 4:30 p.m (Lebanese Local Time)

=== Participants and special guests ===
Names of contestants, their countries of origin and date of elimination:

- Elie Bitar – Lebanon – Winner
- Abdel Majid Ibrahim Saudi Arabia – 24 July 2008
- Mourad El Souiti – Palestine – 17 July 2008
- Asma El Jabri – Morocco – 10 July 2008
- Diana Sharaneq – Lebanon – 10 July 2008
- Dounia Lotfi – Morocco – 26 June 2008
- Aidross El Aidross – Saudi Arabia – 19 June 2008
- Housam Tershishi – Lebanon – 12 June 2008
- Oumaima Taleb – Tunisia – 5 June 2008
- Anoushka Mousa – Egypt – 29 May 2008
- Mohamad El Jafeel – Lebanon – 8 May 2008
- Abbas Ali – Iraq – 1 May 2008

Special Guests:

- Top 11: Layla Ghoufran
- Top 10: Jad Nakhle
- Top 9: Hisham Abbas
- Top 8: Rouwaida Attieh
- Top 7: Nabil Shaeil
- Top 6: Walid Toufic
- Top 5:Majid Al Mohandis
- Top 4:Abdel Rabb Idris
- Top 3: Moeen Charif
- Top 2: Ragheb Alama

=== Finals elimination chart ===
Stage:		Semi-finals			Finals										
Weeks:		04/06	04/13	04/20	05/01	05/08	05/28	06/05	06/12	06/19	06/26	07/03	07/10	07/17	07/24
Place	Contestant	Result													
1	Elie Bitar		IN												Winner
2	Abdelmajeed Ibrahim		IN				Btm3		Btm3			Btm2			Runner-up
3	Mourad El Souiti		IN							Btm2	Btm3			Elim	
4-5	Asma El Jabri	IN				Btm2						Btm3	Elim		
4-5	Diana Sharaneq	IN									Btm2	Elim	Elim		
6	Dounia Loutfi	IN						Btm4		Btm3	Elim				
7	Aidross El Aidross		IN		Btm3		Btm4	Btm4	Btm2	Elim					
8	Housam Tershishi		Elim	WC				Btm4	Elim						
9	Omayma Taleb	IN			Btm4	Btm4	Btm2	Elim							
10	Anoushka Moussa	IN			Btm2	Btm3	Elim								
11	Mohammad Jaafeel		IN			Elim									
12	Abbas Ali		Elim	WC	Elim										

- On 3 July Diana Sharaneq was originally eliminated but brought back by the judges and again eliminated the next week.

Legend
Female	Male	Safe	Safe first	Safe second	Safe third	Eliminated	Wildcard

== Arab Idol ==
On December 9, 2011, the franchise for the region was relaunched on rival network MBC 1, after the channel purchased its rights from Future TV, which abandoned it due to its lack of budget and expensive production cost, as the name of the program was changed from "SuperStar" to Arab Idol.

== See also ==
Arab Idol
