= Jaroudi =

Jaroudi is a surname. Notable people with the surname include:

- Abdullah Jaroudi Sr. (1909–?), Lebanese sports shooter
- Muhieddine Jaroudi, Lebanese footballer
- Saeb N. Jaroudi (1929–2014), Lebanese politician
- Youssef Jaroudi, Lebanese businessman
