= Idol series in Arab World =

Arab World has two adaptations of the singing competition Pop Idol under two different titles and on two different networks:

- SuperStar سوبر ستار, which was aired between 2003 and 2008 on Future Television
- Arab Idol, which premiered in December 2011 on MBC 1
