= Belime =

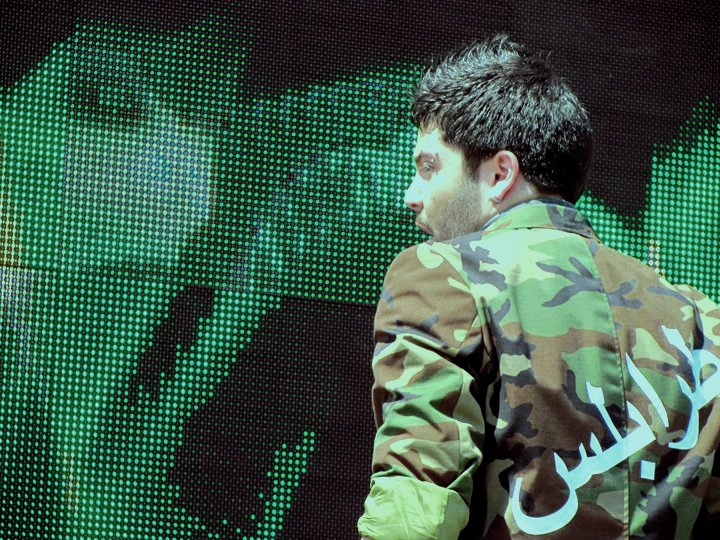
- Belime at the Pop Revolution Tour – May 2011

Background information
- Born: Charbel Ghanime; 28 December 1991 (age 34); Beirut, Lebanon
- Genres: Pop, rock, electronic
- Occupation: Singer
- Years active: 2010–present
- Label: New Wave Productions
- Website: belimemusic.com

Charbel Ghanime (Arabic: شربل غنيمة; born 28 December 1991), known professionally as Belime (/bəˈlaɪm/; often stylized as BELIME), is a Lebanon singer and songwriter.

In September 2010, Belime released his debut album, Trap. The song "This Is Reality" from the album was featured on MTV Arabia, Orbit MusicNow, and NRJ Lebanon.

== Early life ==
Belime was born in the district of Achrafieh in Beirut, as the youngest of the family's three children. He is the son of Afaf, a former English teacher, and Toufic Ghanime, an interior designer. He has two elder sisters, Jessica and Sharon.

Belime grew up between Lebanon and Saudi Arabia and has a family in Canada. He attended Sagesse High School, a local Catholic school.

For some time, Belime's two elder sisters learned the piano at home. As a child, Belime learned how to play the piano by ear. He still plays at this self-taught level. Belime composes most of his songs on the piano. He gained an interest in rap music at age 12.

== Career ==
=== Early career ===
In his early teen years, Belime discovered rock music, punk rock in particular, and was part of four different bands, performing mainly pop punk songs. He began songwriting at that time, and by the time he turned 17, Belime had penned over 30 songs. Belime failed at putting together numerous bands to perform his songs, and always faced problems with members who were not serious enough. After happening to hear "War'a Bayda", a song by Star Academy's Maya Nehme, Belime contacted Walid Al Massih, who signed Belime to his production company, New Wave Productions.

Now working solo, Belime improved on his compositions and spent his time trying to find his sound as a solo artist, after being used to being a part of bands. While working with Walid Al Massih, Belime took part in a song titled "Let's Fight for Change" for awareness about HIV/AIDS through Y-PEER Lebanon of the UNFPA. Belime helped write the song and sings the recurring chorus in it. The song was choreographed and danced to by members of Y-PEER Lebanon as part of the 2009 Jeux de la Francophonie which took place that year.

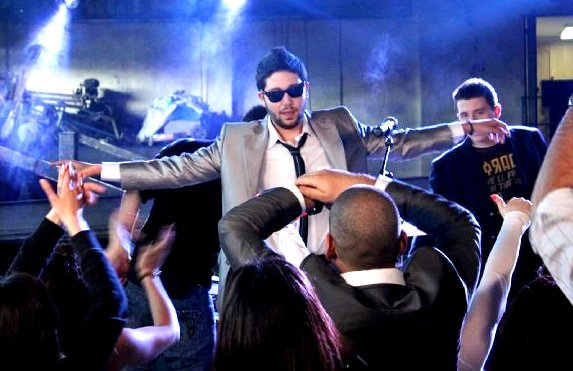
Shot from "This Is Reality" music video

=== 2010: Trap ===
Soon after signing with Walid al-Masish and the release of "Let's Fight for Change", Belime confirmed his solo album was expected to be released in February 2010. Belime later announced that the album was to be put on hold as he was dissatisfied with the preliminary results.

In June 2010, Belime announced the beginning of his album promotions, beginning with a debut performance at one of Beirut's clubs "Palais by Crystal". That same month, Belime performed at the Music Festival (Fête de la Musique) in Downtown Beirut to numerous spectators. Towards the end of June, Belime released his debut single "This Is Reality" digitally via YouTube. The video was directed by Lebanese director Jimmy Keyrouz and filmed in and around the city of Jounieh north of Beirut.

In September 2010, Belime would announce that he will be selling limited pre-launch copies of the album at the Hamra Streets Festival on 11 and 12 September. During his two shows at the Hamra Streets Festival, Belime introduced "The Belime Girls", four female hip-hop dancers who would join him in all of his future performances. Upon the release of the album, the pre-launch copies were sold at every event that Belime performed at. The album was given 4 out of 6 stars by Time Out Beirut.

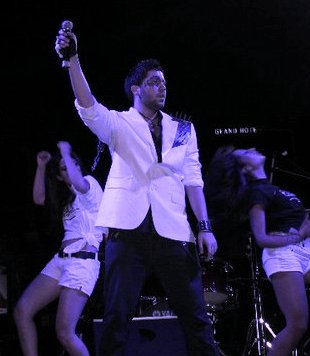
Belime at the 2010 Hamra Streets Festival

=== 2011: Pop Revolution Tour and work on second album ===
In April 2011, Belime announced on his Facebook page that he will be touring Lebanon as of May 2011, with his first concert being at the Tripoli International Half Marathon 2011, where he headlined along with Michel Azzi and Brigitte Yaghi. The tour was themed after the revolutions that occurred around the Middle East not long before the beginning of his tour. During the tour, Belime introduced a new track into his repertoire titled "Dice" which he has announced will be the first single off his next album.

== Criticism ==
In a live interview with MTV Lebanon's show @MTV, Belime was faced with criticisms about singing in the English language rather than in Arabic. Belime was accused of promoting the English language over Arabic as part of Lebanese tradition. In response, Belime said:

We all speak Arabic, I am now speaking Arabic, but we also pride ourselves as Lebanese in speaking three languages. When someone comes to Lebanon, we don't tell them that we only speak Arabic here, but that we greet each other by saying "Hi, Kifak, Ca va?". So yes, as a Lebanese, I believe I should sing in English, because while it is not part of our traditions, it is very much a part of our culture.

— Belime, MTV Lebanon

== Discography ==
- 2010: Trap
