= Super Star El Arab =

سوبر ستار العرب

Studio album by Diana Karazon
- Released: October 10, 2003
- Recorded: August/September 2003
- Genre: Pop
- Length: 43:01
- Label: Music Master International
- Producer: Mohamed El Refai, Elias Nasr, Samir Nakhla, Talal Antar, Mounir Bou Asaf, Toni Abi Karam, Ahmed El Shraqaoui

Diana Karazon chronology
سوبر ستار العرب (2003)	العمر ماشـي (2005)

Super Star El Arab (Arabic: سوبر ستار العرب) is the first album of songs performed by Diana Karazon, the winner of the Arabic TV series Super Star.

== Track listing ==
All tracks are written by Siham Shaasha'a, Eliane Nehme, Nizar Francis, Mounir Bou Assaf, Aline Karam, and Ahmad Madi.

No.	Title	Length
1.	"Ensani Ma Binsak (انساني ما بنساك)"	5:08
2.	"Hobak Kawini (حبك كويني)"	4:44
3.	"Omri Law Leyla (عمري لو ليلة)"	3:39
4.	"Habibi Ana (حبيبي انا)"	5:29
5.	"Ma Sheftak Ella Marra (ما شفتك الا مرة)"	5:10
6.	"Bi Ezz El Leyl (بعز الليل)"	4:58
7.	"Mahma Alou (مهما قالوا)"	4:27
8.	"Bghar Aleyk (بغار عليك)"	4:59
9.	"El Char Bara W Bi'id (الشر بره وبعيد)"	4:27
Total length:		43:01

== See also ==
- Jordanian music
