= Diana 2010 =

العمر ماشي

Studio album by Diana Karazon
- Released: January 19, 2010
- Recorded: 2005–2009
- Genre: Khaliji, Lebanese, Egyptian, Iraqi, Jordanian
- Label: Al Amal/Alam El Phan
- Producer: Mohamed al-majali

Diana Karazon chronology
El Omr Mashi (2005)	العمر ماشي (2010)	Rasak Bel Aaly (2010)

Diana 2010 is the third album by Jordanian singer Diana Karazon and is produced under the Jordanian label Al-Amal and was released under the Egyptian label Alam El Phan. It featured 12 songs in the Lebanese, Egyptian, Khaliji, Iraqi and Jordanian Arabic dialects.

== Track listing ==
1. "Ad El Koun" (Lebanese)
2. "Amir El Sahra"[Magical Prince] (Iraqi)
3. "Dowkh We Dawakhny" (Jordanian)
4. "Enta El Gharam" [You are my love] (Lebanese)
5. "Fe Had Eshtakalak" (Egyptian)
6. "Jarh" [Traitor/Betrayal] (Khaliji)
7. "Khely Ya Khely" (Jordanian)
8. "Momken Ansak" (Egyptian)
9. "Shayef Alai Nafsak" (Khaliji)
10. "Wayak" (Egyptian)
11. "Wesh El Tary" (Khaliji)
12. "Ya Kebeer" (Jordanian)
