= Waad Al Bahri =

Waad Al Bahri وعد البحري
- Born: Waad Zaid Al Bahri; 1 October 1981 (age 44)
- Origin: As-Suwayda, Syria
- Genres: Arabic music
- Occupations: Singer, entertainer
- Years active: 2004–present
- Label: Alam El Phan
- Website: www.waadalbahri.net

Waad Al Bahri (Arabic: وعد البحري) is a Syrian who participated in SuperStar (Arabic TV series) and reached the finals of the program. She is also a singer and has produced one album.

== Early life ==
Bahri started singing at the age of four. She sang at many occasions and festivals and sang all the songs of the series Asmahan. She titled her first album "Agayer Hayaty". She then appeared in a video clip for a song from the album as the "Tagreba".

== Education and career ==
Bahri received a bachelor's degree in business administration and currently resides in both Abu Dhabi, where her family lives, and Cairo, where she is active artistically and visits many concerts and festivals.

=== Albums ===
- Aghayer Hayati
