= Ayman Alatar =

Libyan singer of Arabic pop music

- أيمن الأعتر
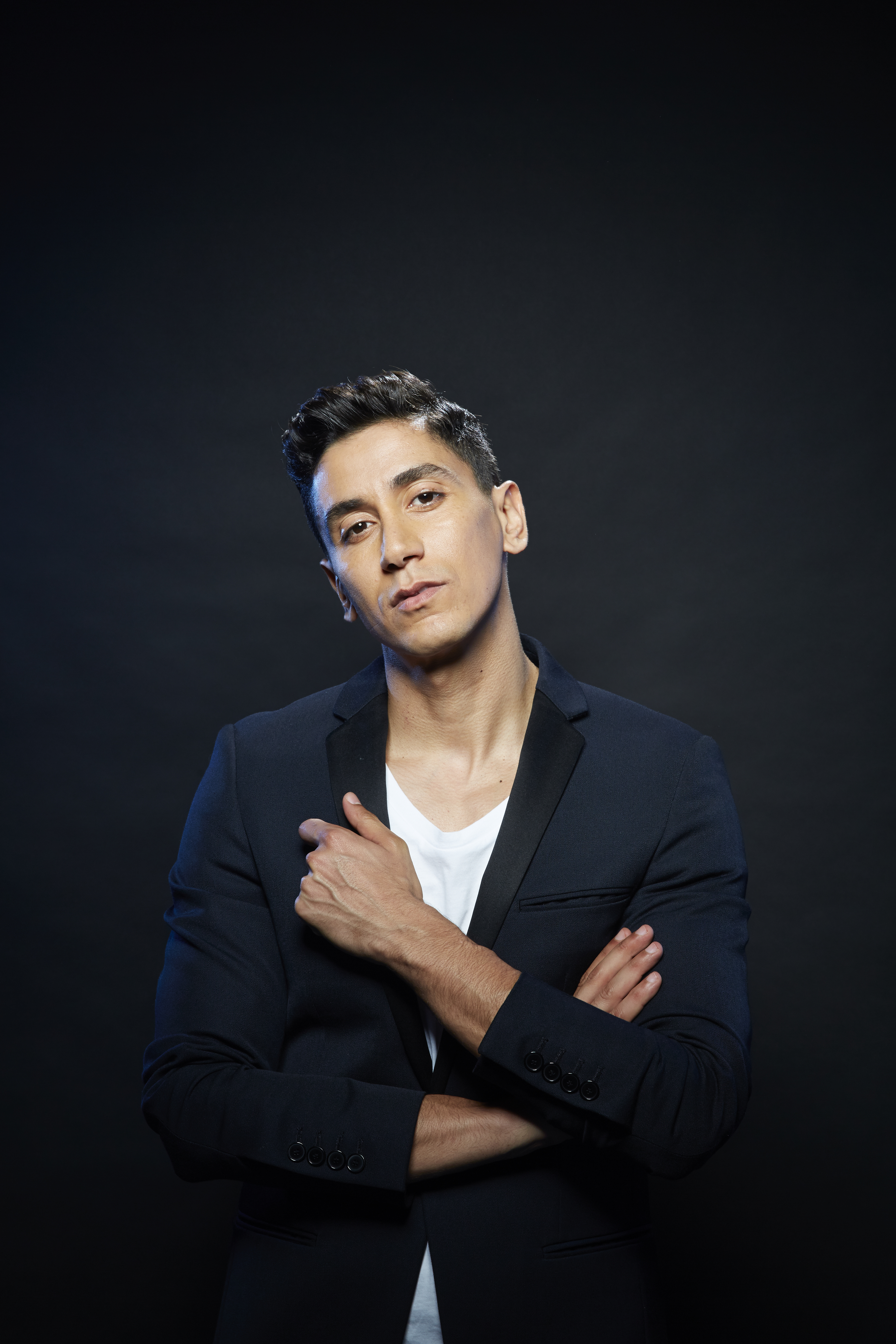
- Ayman in 2014
- Born: March 6, 1982 (age 43); Tripoli, Libya
- Occupations: singer; actor
- Years active: 1992 – present
- Musical career
- Genres: Arabic music
- Labels: Rotana Music Group; Music Master
- Website: AymanAlatar.com

Ayman Alatar (Arabic: أيمن الأعتر; born 6 March 1982) is a Libyan singer of Arabic pop music. He was the winner of SuperStar, Season 2, 2004, the Arabic version of American Idol.

== Early life and career ==
Alatar was born in Tripoli. He was the winner of the Libyan song festival 2001, the first edition. He was also nominated for Kora Awards 2016, African music Awards, in the category of “Best Artist of North Africa” with the track “Hal El Awadem”. Ayman was also nominated for Afrima Awards 2016, held in Nigeria in the category of “Best Artist OF North Africa” with the track "Fi Galbi Kalam" from his third album.

Alatar released his first album, Bahibak and a music video of the song “Bahibak” in 2005. Alatar is the first Arabic singer, who is not a native speaker of the khaleeji dialect that released a full album in that dialect. His second album, "Hal EL Awadem" was produced and distributed by Rotana in November 2014.

Alatar's third album "Fi Galbi Kalam" is a mini album of four Khaliji (music) songs. This album and the music video of the hit song “Fi Galbi Kalam” were released by Rotana in February 2016.

Alatar performed at the closing concert of Febrayer Kuwait festival 2015. He also took part in the tribute concert for the late Warda Al-Jazairia in Algeria in June 2015. He was the star of the TFK London Launch Party under the patronage of Sheikh Majed Alsabah in London in 22/7/2016. Alatar and his team organized the concert at Union Chapel, becoming the first Arabic singer to sing with the London Community Gospel Choir.

Alatar's collaboration with Viber in 2018 resulted in releasing his own stickers to be used by viber users.

== Singles ==
- "Ya Lailaty" 2011
- "Halba" 2013
- "Yalaziz" 2014
- "Shwayat Hanan" 2015
- "Ramadan" 2015
- "Ana Wella Ana" 2017
- "Allah Yester" 2017
- "Wesh Asameek" 2018
- "Aanest Ya Ramadn" 2018
- "Ya Delaly" 2018
- "La Arak" 2019
- "Makafak" 2019
- "Salam Libya" 2019
- "Rouh" 2019
- "Ouyoni" 2021
- "Mahagait" 2021
- "Kilna Kathab" 2021
- "Lao Yelaheth" 2021
- "Khithlanek" 2021
- "Rahbiti" 2022
- "Atetek Hob" 2022
- "Semaat Ennek" 2022

== Music videos ==
1. "Bahibak" 2005 directed by Leila Kanaan.
2. "Halba" 2013 directed by Ahmed Almahdi.
3. "Yalaziz" 2014 directed by Oz Thakkar.
4. "Hal El Awadem" 2014 directed by Jak x.
5. "Fi Galbi Kalam” 2016 directed by Carly Cussen.
6. "Ebtesem" 2016 directed Rossco.
7. "Allah Yester" 2017 directed by Gilbert Bouzied and sponsored by Pepsi Arabia.
8. "La Arak" 2019 directed by Geoffrey Airebamen.
9. "Salam Ya Libya" 2019.
10. "Rahbiti" 2022 directed by Saeed Farhat.
11. "Atetek Hob" 2022.
12. "Semaat Ennek" 2022 directed by Igor Fain.

== Discography ==
1. Bahibak 2005
2. Hal El Awadem 2014
3. Fi Galbi Kalam 2016
