= Marwan Ali =

- Origin: Tunisia
- Occupation: Singer

Marwan Ali (Arabic: مروان علي) is a Tunisian pop singer, the winner of the Arab Super Star show, a version of the British show Pop Idol.

SuperStar is broadcast on Future TV, a Lebanese television station and is the first Idol franchise to feature contestants from multiple countries.

Marwan, an 18-year-old student at the time, won the fourth season of SuperStarcompetition broadcast from 22 January to 4 June 2007, against 12 other late-stage participants from Lebanon, Tunisia, Morocco, Egypt and Syria. His competitors in the final show were Saad Lamjarred from Morocco and Yousra Mahnouch from Tunisia. His prizes included a new car from Ford, and a recording contract to help launch his debut album.

He released his first single "Rah Ghany" in 2009.

Preceded by Ibrahim El Hakami	Super Star; Winner; Season 4 (2007)	Succeeded by Elie Bitar
