= Osy Ikhile =

British actor

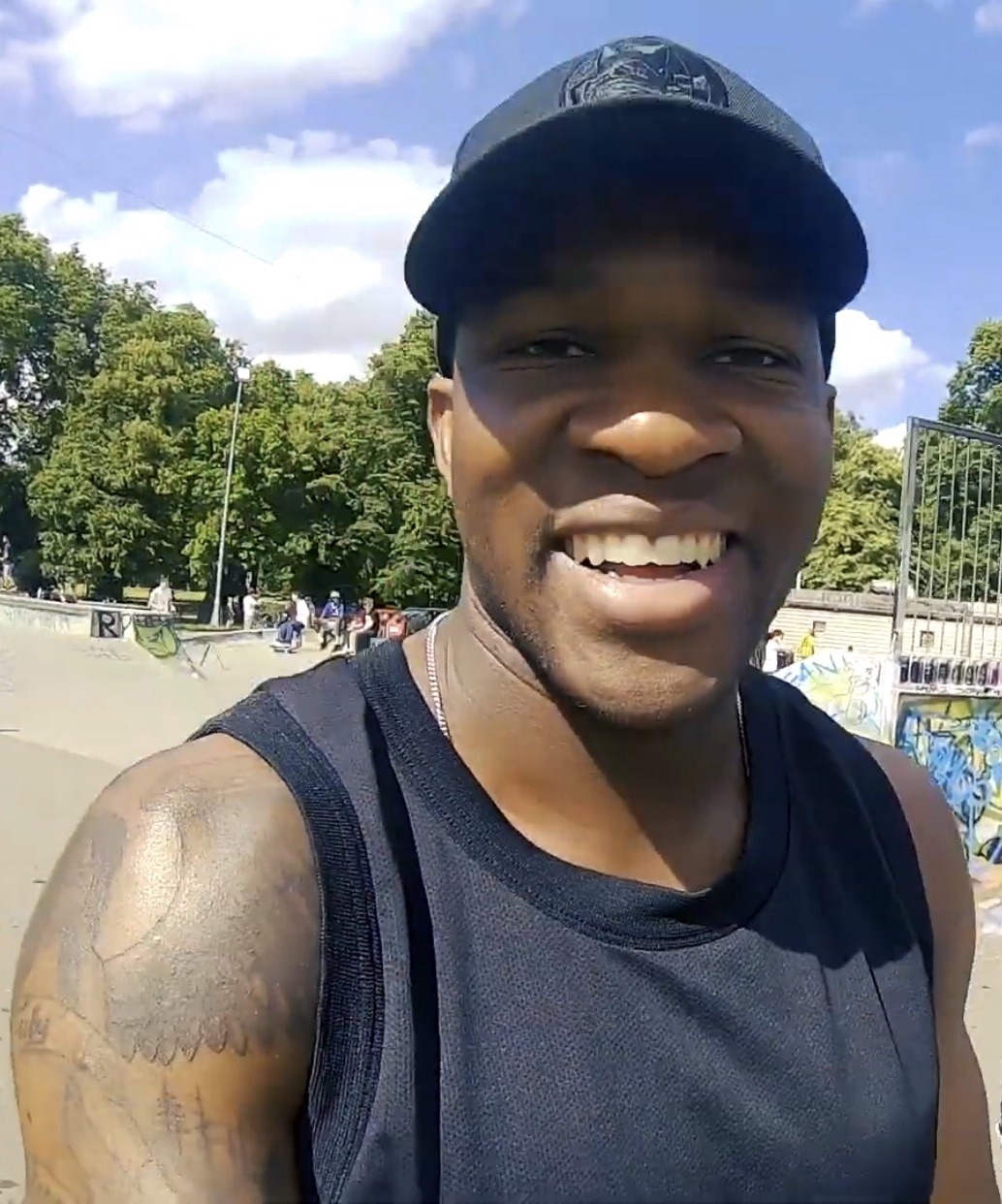
- Ikhile in 2019
- Born: London, England
- Occupation: Actor
- Years active: 2008–present
- Known for: In the Heart of the Sea, Childhood's End and The Legend of Tarzan
- Height: 1.78 m (5 ft 10 in)

Osy Ikhile is a British actor, producer and filmmaker best known for his roles as Richard Peterson in In the Heart of the Sea and Milo Rodricks in Childhood's End, and as Nate Packer in the Black Mirror episode "USS Callister" (2017) and its 2025 sequel episode.

== Early life and education ==
Osy Ikhile was born in London, England, and is of Nigerian heritage. From a young age, he exhibited a passion for the arts, particularly in acting. He pursued his interest by attending the Identity School of Acting, a drama school in London known for training actors from diverse backgrounds.

== Career ==
=== Film and television ===
Ikhile's international breakthrough came with his role in the science fiction film The Legend of Tarzan (2016), where he played "Kwete". His performance opened doors to further opportunities in the industry.

He continued to build his career with roles in projects such as In the Heart of the Sea (2015), directed by Ron Howard, and Sand Castle (2017), a war drama film. Ikhile's television credits also include appearances in popular series like Black Mirror and Doctor Who.

== Filmography ==
=== Filmmaking credits ===
- Normal? (2014) – directed, produced
- Clap! (2014) – directed, produced, wrote, edited, director of photography
- Hot Pepper Episode: "One-Night Stand" (2015) – director of photography, gaffer
- The Moor Girl (2017) – produced
- Beauty in the Street (2017) – co-produced
- The Reserves (2018) – executive produced

=== Film ===
Year	Title	Role	Notes
2008	School Without Walls	Malcolm	
2011	Victim	Zimma	
2012	What If	Devon's Crew	Short film
2014	The Anomaly	Officer Jones	
2014	Clap!	Osy	Short film
2015	Mission: Impossible – Rogue Nation	CIA Jet Agent	
2015	Kill Your Friends	Rage	
2015	In the Heart of the Sea	Richard Peterson	
2016	Ghosting	Ghostee	Short film
2016	The Legend of Tarzan	Kwete	
2016	Jet Trash	Sol	
2017	Daphne	Tom	
2017	Beautiful Devils	Oz	
2017	Sand Castle	Msg. Pepps	
2017	Hip Hop Cafe	Jack	Short film
2018	Details to Follow	Nathan	Short film
2018	The House That Jack Built	Military Man	
2018	Multi-Facial	Ivan	Short film
2019	Nobody's Son	Darren	Short film
2019	She Lies Sleeping	Daniel	Short film
2019	The Kill Team	Weppler	

=== Television ===
Year	Title	Role	Notes
2010	PhoneShop	Nightclub Doorman 2	Episode: "The First Temptation of Chris"
2011	Casualty	Zac Turner	Episode: "Keep On Running: Part 2"
2011	Fresh Meat	Rashid	1 episode
2011	The Tower	Jacob	Television film
2012	Twenty Twelve	Mini Steppah	Episode: "The Rapper"
2012	The Riots: In Their Own Words	Himself	Television documentary
2012	Blackout	Nelson Venner	Miniseries; 1 episode
2012	Misfits	Craig	1 episode
2012	The Fear	Jason Kemp	Miniseries; main role
2013	Fit	Various	
2013	Doctors	PC Robert Parker	Episode: "Mother's Choice"
2015	Childhood's End	Milo Rodricks	Miniseries; main role
2017	Urban Myths	Joe	Episode: "The Greatest of All Time"
2017	All of Them	Elias	2 episodes
2017	Black Mirror	Nate Packer	Episode: "USS Callister"
2018	Death in Paradise	Cordell Thomas	Episode: "Dark Memories"
2019	The Feed	Maxwell Jeremiah "Max" Vaughn	Main role
2023	Citadel	Carter Spence	
2025–2026	All American	Cassius Jeremy	Main Role (Season 7–8)
2025	Black Mirror	Nate Packer	Episode: "USS Callister: Into Infinity"

=== Video games ===
Year	Title	Role	Notes
2016	Steep	Mason Bell	
2018	Jurassic World Evolution	Isaac Clement	
2018	Hitman 2	Stone	
2019	Blood & Truth	Voice Talent	
2021	Destruction AllStars	Bluefang	
2021	Jurassic World Evolution 2	Isaac Clement	
2023	Payday 3	Beckett	
2025	Jurassic World Evolution 3	Isaac Clement	
2025	Vampire: The Masquerade – Bloodlines 2	Max Webber	

== Stage ==
Year	Title	Role	Notes
2016	Torn	Couzin	Royal Court Theatre, London
2018	Sweat	Chris	Donmar Warehouse; Gielgud Theatre
