= LM3ALLEM =

Arabic song by Saad Lamjarred

Single by Saad Lamjarred
- Released: 2 May 2015
- Genre: Pop
- Length: 4:14
- Songwriter: Jalal El Hamdaoui

Music video
- "LM3ALLEM" on YouTube

LM3ALLEM (Moroccan Arabic: لمعلم, lit. 'The Master') is a song recorded by Moroccan singer Saad Lamjarred and released as a single on the 2nd of May, 2015. It was written by Jalal El Hamdaoui.

== Music video ==
The official music video on YouTube crossed 31 millions views within one month and 121 million views within three months of the release, earning a Guinness World Records achievement. As of November 2024, it has crossed more than 1 billion views on YouTube. It is the most-viewed Arabic music video on YouTube.

Several versions of the song were made in different languages like English, Hindi and Korean. The song became popular in weddings in Egypt.
