= Nancy Nasrallah =

Nancy Nasrallah نانسي نصر الله
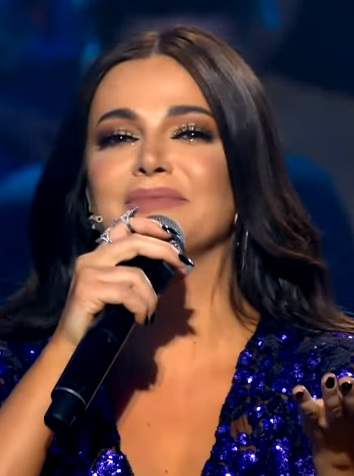
- Nancy Nasrallah singing at MTV Lebanon Studio, 17 June 2019

Background information
- Born: Nancy Nasrallah
- Origin: Beirut, Lebanon
- Genres: Arabic pop, Dance pop Arab Tarab, Arabic music, Lebanese pop, Middle Eastern music.
- Occupations: Singer, musician, songwriter
- Years active: 2006–present
- Label: Jaroudi Media

Nancy Nasrallah (Arabic: نانسي نصر الله) is a Lebanese pop singer who participated in SuperStar (Arabic TV series). Later, she participated in The Voice Ahla Sawt season 2 and she was in the Saber Rebai team.

== Discography ==
=== Singles ===
- 50 Alf series song (2018)
- Ma Fik (2017)
- Eid bi Eid (2016)
- No'ta Aal Sater (2015)
- Batal Majrouh (2015)
- Set Al Habayeb (2015)
- Gheblak Shi Yawm (2015)

== Videography ==
Official Music Videos
Year	Title	Album	Director
2015	"Batal majrouh"	Single	Walid Nassif
2015	"No'ta aal sater"	Single	Walid Nassif
2017	"Ma fik"	Single	Karam N.Karam
