= Mi Eraz =

Studio album by Maria Nalbandian
- Released: February 14, 2015
- Recorded: 2014
- Studio: All Go Rhythm Records
- Genre: Pop
- Label: Karen Studio
- Producer: Ara Hovhannisyan; Arman Antonyan; Ruzanna Andreasyan

Maria Nalbandian chronology
We Regeat Tany (2007)	Mi Eraz (2015)

Mi Eraz (Arabic: حلم, English: A Dream), is the third studio album, and first full-length Armenian album by Armenian-Lebanese singer and actress Maria Nalbandian. It was released on February 14, 2015.

== Background ==
Nalbandian released her debut Armenian single "Djane Djan" in 2013, and continued releasing Armenian singles until she began recording a full-length album in 2014. The album was produced and written mainly by Armenian artists Ara Hovhannisyan, Arman Antonyan and Ruzanna Andreasyan. Nalbandian said her album was entitled A Dream because creating a full Armenian album was her greatest dream. Her previous record We Regeat Tany (2007), included an Armenian song called "Ourestoun". The song "Elek Hayer" (Rise Armenians) calls on the people of Armenia to be enthusiastic and united.

== Track listing ==
No.	Title	Lyrics	Music	Producer	Length
1.	"Mi Eraz" (A Dream)	Arman Antonyan	Arman Antonyan	Arman Antonyan	3:33
2.	"Shnorhavor" (Happy Birthday)	Ara Hovhannisyan	Ara Hovhannisyan	Ara Hovhannisyan	3:44
3.	"Elek Hayer" (Rise Armenians)	Ruzanna Andreasyan	Ruzanna Andreasyan	Ruzanna Andreasyan	3:54
4.	"Inc Moracir" (Forget Me)	Ara Hovhannisyan	Ara Hovhannisyan	Ara Hovhannisyan	3:02
5.	"Ser Chega" (No Love)	Ara Hovhannisyan	Ara Hovhannisyan	Ara Hovhannisyan	3:11
6.	"Chem Neri" (Would Not Forgive)	Ara Hovhannisyan	Ara Hovhannisyan	Ara Hovhannisyan	4:00
7.	"Harsi Namage" (Bride Message)	Ara Hovhannisyan	Ara Hovhannisyan	Ara Hovhannisyan	4:09
8.	"De Kena" (Go Away)	Arman Antonyan	Arman Antonyan	Arman Antonyan	3:32
