= Childhood's End (miniseries) =

- Promotional poster
- Genre: Science fiction
- Based on: Childhood's End by Arthur C. Clarke
- Developed by: Matthew Graham
- Starring: Mike Vogel; Osy Ikhile; Daisy Betts; Yael Stone; Georgina Haig; Charles Dance
- Composer: Charlie Clouser
- Countries of origin: United States; Australia
- Original language: English
- No. of episodes: 3

Production
- Executive producers: Akiva Goldsman; Michael De Luca; Matthew Graham; Alissa Phillips
- Running time: 246 minutes
- Production companies: Monastic Productions; Michael De Luca Productions; Weed Road Pictures; Universal Cable Productions

Original release
- Network: Syfy
- Release: December 14 – December 16, 2015

Childhood's End is an American-Australian science-fiction television miniseries based on the 1953 novel of the same name, by Arthur C. Clarke, and developed by Matthew Graham. It premiered on Syfy on December 14, 2015.

== Cast ==
=== Main ===
- Mike Vogel as Ricky Stormgren
- Osy Ikhile as Milo Rodericks
- Daisy Betts as Ellie Stormgren
- Yael Stone as Peretta Jones
- Georgina Haig as Annabelle Stormgren
- Charles Dance as Karellen

=== Supporting ===
- Colm Meaney as Hugo Wainwright (credited as guest star in "The Overlords")
- Don Hany as Paul Danlow
- Darius Amarfio Jefferson as young Milo Rodericks
- Ashley Zukerman as Jake Greggson
- Hayley Magnus as Amy Morrel
- Julian McMahon as Dr. Rupert Boyce (credited as special guest star in "The Deceivers")
- Charlotte Nicdao as Rachel Osaka
- Tanc Sade as Jerry Hallcross
- Robert Rabiah as Saudi Business Man
- Russell Kiefel as Sheriff De Bont

== Development ==
From the late 1960s, attempts had been made to adapt Childhood's End as a movie, but none of them ever proceeded out of development hell.

On April 10, 2013, Syfy announced its plans to develop a TV miniseries based on Childhood's End. On September 3, 2014, Syfy announced that Childhood's End had been greenlit for three two-hour episodes, for a 2015 airing. The series was going to be written by Matthew Graham, directed by Nick Hurran, and produced by Akiva Goldsman and Mike DeLuca. On October 24, 2014, it was announced that Charles Dance would play Karellen. On November 21, 2014, it was announced that Mike Vogel would play Ricky Stormgren. On January 12, 2015, it was announced that Colm Meaney would play Wainwright and Charlotte Nicdao would play Rachel Osaka. A trailer for the miniseries was released in May 2015. The series premiered in December 2015.

== Episodes ==
No.	Title	Directed by	Teleplay by	Original release date	US viewers (millions)
1	"The Overlords"	Nick Hurran	Matthew Graham	December 14, 2015	1.45
Milo Rodericks, claiming to be the last living human, records a message from the ruin of a post-apocalyptic Earth. In 2016, a fleet of massive alien space ships appear in the skies of Earth. Dubbed 'the Overlords', the alien 'Supervisor for Earth' Karellen speaks to humanity claiming they have come to usher in an age of utopia. Karellen speaks to a farmer named Ricky Stormgren in the form of his deceased wife Annabelle, and chooses Ricky to serve as humanity's representative. Despite initial resistance and distrust from governments, the Overlords systematically eliminate disease, war, hunger, and pollution, setting the stage for the 'Golden Age of Humanity'. When Milo, currently using a wheelchair, is shot and killed by a drug dealer, the Overlords kill the attacker and resurrect Milo, as well as giving him the ability to walk. Media mogul Hugo Wainwright secretly organizes a counter-group dubbed the Freedom League, which uses social media to spread distrust about the Overlords. When their years-long campaign fails to slow the aliens' changes, the Freedom League kidnaps Ricky to force Karellen's hand. Karellen intervenes, saving Ricky's life while simultaneously projecting Wainwright's entire conspiracy to the world. Shortly afterwards, Wainwright is found hanged and Karellen dismisses Ricky, saying his work is now finished. Ricky asks Karellen to show his true self to humanity, but the alien retorts that humans are not yet ready to 'accept' his true form. Fifteen years later, Milo has become an astrophysicist, and watches along with Ricky and the rest of the world as Karellen reveals himself for the first time. With Earth now a near-Utopia, humanity has dubbed the Overlords their 'guardian angels', but are shocked and alarmed when Karellen emerges, his appearance resembling that of devils and demons.
2	"The Deceivers"	Nick Hurran	Matthew Graham	December 15, 2015	1.24
In 2035, life on Earth resembles a pastoral idyll. Dr. Boyce leads a research institute for Karellen, at which Milo and his friend Rachel work, until the space program is ended and Milo has to leave. Boyce delivers samples of Earth's species for a zoo on the overlords’ planet. Ricky falls ill, allegedly from exposure to poisons on the overlord ship. An overlord pod visits the Greggsons, after which the mother Amy is pregnant, and son Tommy is changed as he attacks his father. The faithful Peretta Jones is called as counsellor, because Tommy is haunted by night terrors of a dark and hot place, but he refuses to reveal more as not to frighten the adults. During their encounter, Peretta's cross necklace is destroyed, a deeply frightening spiritual experience for her, so she seeks out her old pastor and visits the Stormgren farm for answers. After the Overlords build a room with a Ouija board, Boyce invites the Greggsons to South Africa under false pretenses. When they arrive, Karellen makes Amy operate the communication device through her unborn child. Milo finds out that the message was directed at the constellation Carina. Karellen returns to Ricky, and Ellie and Peretta interrupt them. Peretta confronts Karellen about his lies, and he confesses he sterilized Ricky because the upcoming change will be more painful for parents. Peretta shoots Karellen, but Ricky uses a cure that was meant for him to save Karellen. Peretta commits suicide for her part in shooting Karellen. Finally, Amy gives birth to her daughter Jennifer.
3	"The Children"	Nick Hurran	Matthew Graham	December 16, 2015	1.28
Four years later, the children of Earth begin to demonstrate advanced psychic abilities and form a mental link with Jennifer. The Greggson family is wary of what is happening to her and they move to the free city of New Athens, hoping to escape Karellen's influence. Ricky finally succumbs to his illness. Karellen announces to the world that all of the children will be gathered together, that no more children will be born, and that the adults are free to live out their lives as they wish. The children begin to float off through the sky. The mayor of New Athens decides that hope is lost and sets off a nuclear bomb, destroying the city. Milo smuggles himself aboard one of the ships transporting zoo animals, and upon arrival at the Overlords' home world he is shown a glimpse of the Overmind, a vast cosmic intelligence which they serve. Milo returns to Earth some 80 years later (due to time dilation), just before the moment when the children join the Overmind. He goes to the surface and begins transmitting a report to Karellen (the first part of which was shown in Episode 1). He asks Karellen to leave behind some memento of Earth's culture, and Karellen obliges, choosing a recording of Ralph Vaughan Williams's "The Lark Ascending" heard in Milo's childhood. The Earth is destroyed as the children join the Overmind.

== Reception ==
Childhood's End has a score of 70% on Rotten Tomatoes, with a critical consensus of "While it doesn't quite live up to the book that inspired it, Childhood's End has a balanced narrative and sympathetic performances."

== See also ==
- 2015 in science fiction
