= Daphne (2017 film) =

2017 British drama film

- Theatrical release poster
- Directed by: Peter Mackie Burns
- Written by: Nico Mensinga
- Produced by: Valentina Brazzini; Tristan Goligher
- Starring: Emily Beecham; Tom Vaughan-Lawlor; Geraldine James; Nathaniel Martello-White; Osy Ikhile; Sinead Matthews; Stuart McQuarrie
- Cinematography: Adam Scarth
- Edited by: Nick Emerson
- Music by: Sam Beste
- Production company: The Bureau
- Distributed by: Altitude Film Distribution
- Release dates: 29 January 2017 (IFFR); 29 September 2017 (United Kingdom)
- Running time: 87 minutes
- Country: United Kingdom
- Language: English

Daphne is a 2017 British drama film directed by Peter Mackie Burns and written by Nico Mensinga. It stars Emily Beecham, Tom Vaughan-Lawlor, Geraldine James, Nathaniel Martello-White, Osy Ikhile, Sinead Matthews and Stuart McQuarrie. It was released on 29 September 2017 by Altitude Film Entertainment.

== Synopsis ==
Daphne Vitale (Emily Beecham), a witty, funny, and life of the party young woman, is navigating the complex world of contemporary living. She is caught up in the daily rush of her restaurant job and a nightlife kaleidoscope of new faces, but she is too busy to notice that she is not truly happy.

Her impenetrable armor starts to crack when she saves the life of a store owner who was stabbed during a botched robbery. This event forces her to confront the reality of her own mortality and the need for change in her life.

Daphne realizes that she has been living on autopilot, going through the motions without really taking the time to reflect on what she wants or needs. She has been surrounded by superficial relationships and fleeting pleasures, but she has been lacking in true meaning and purpose.

The experience of saving the store owner's life awakens Daphne to the beauty and fragility of life. She realizes that she wants to live her life more authentically and intentionally. She wants to build deeper relationships, pursue her passions, and make a difference in the world.

Daphne begins to make small changes in her life. She starts spending more time with the people she loves, doing things that make her happy, and giving back to her community. She also starts to explore her own interests and talents, and she begins to develop a new sense of purpose.

Over time, Daphne becomes more aware of her personal needs and values. She begins to balance her work and social life while developing closer relationships with others. She also becomes more willing to express her feelings and show vulnerability.

== Cast ==
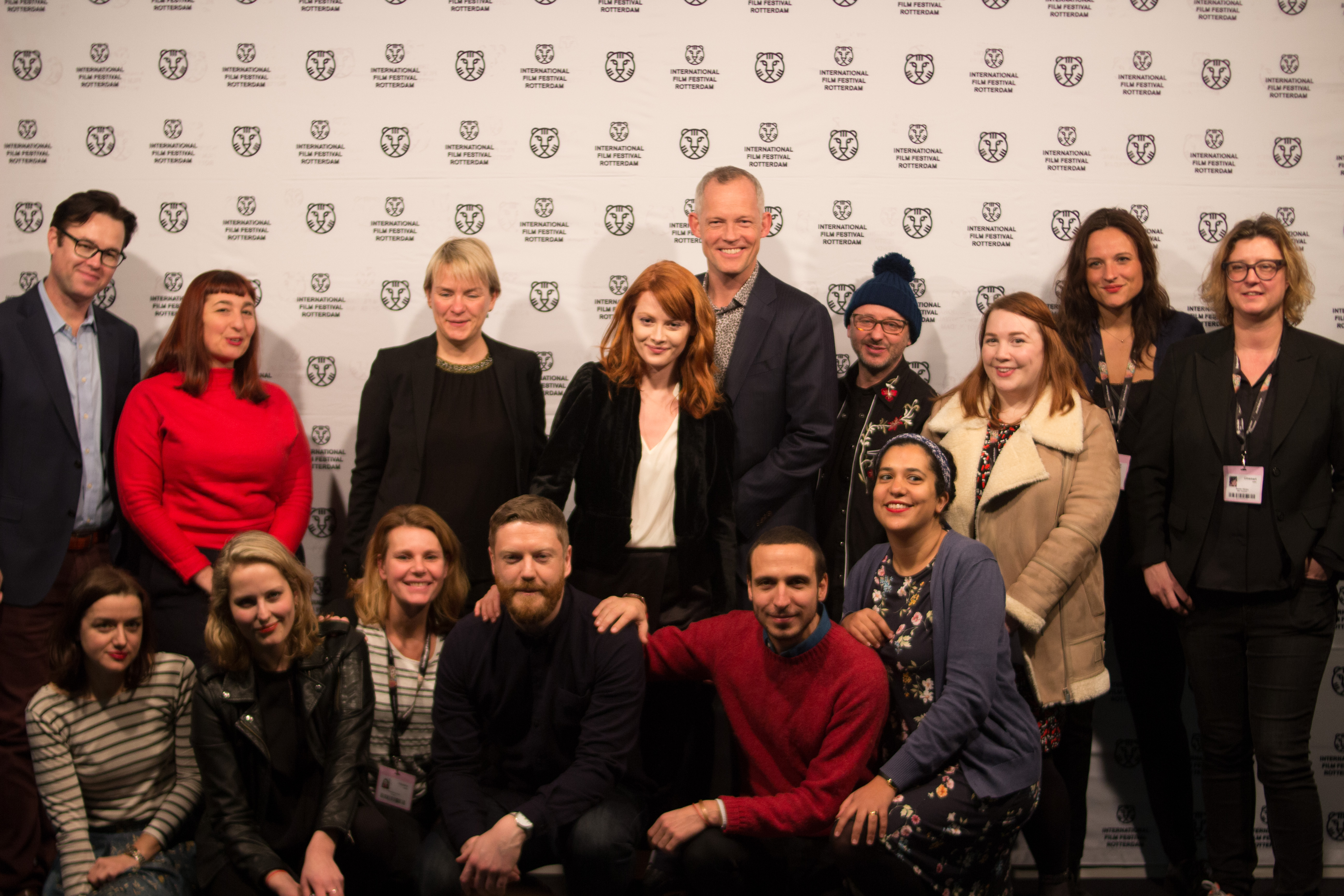
Cast and crew with festival director Bero Beyer at the 46th International Films Festival Rotterdam, 2017

- Emily Beecham as Daphne Vitale
- Tom Vaughan-Lawlor as Joe
- Geraldine James as Rita
- Nathaniel Martello-White as David
- Osy Ikhile as Tom
- Sinead Matthews as Billie
- Stuart McQuarrie as Adam
- Ryan McParland as Jay
- Ritu Arya as Rachida
- Karina Fernandez as Beth
- Timothy Innes as Jimbo
- Rania Kurdi as Sofia
- Amra Mallassi as Benny
- Matthew Pidgeon as Nacho
- Ragevan Vasan as Kumar
- Corinna Brown as Girl on Bus

== Release ==
The film premiered at the International Film Festival Rotterdam on 29 January 2017. The film was released on 29 September 2017 by Altitude Film Entertainment.

== Reception ==
On review aggregator website Rotten Tomatoes, the film holds an approval rating of 100% based on 31 reviews, and an average rating of 7.29/10. The site's consensus reads: "Led by Emily Beecham's note-perfect performance, Daphne is a vivid portrait of a woman in flux - and an auspicious narrative debut for director Peter Mackie Burns".

== Accolades ==
Beecham was nominated for a BIFA for Best Performance by an Actress in a British Independent Film.
