= Rania Kurdi =

Jordanian singer (born 1976)

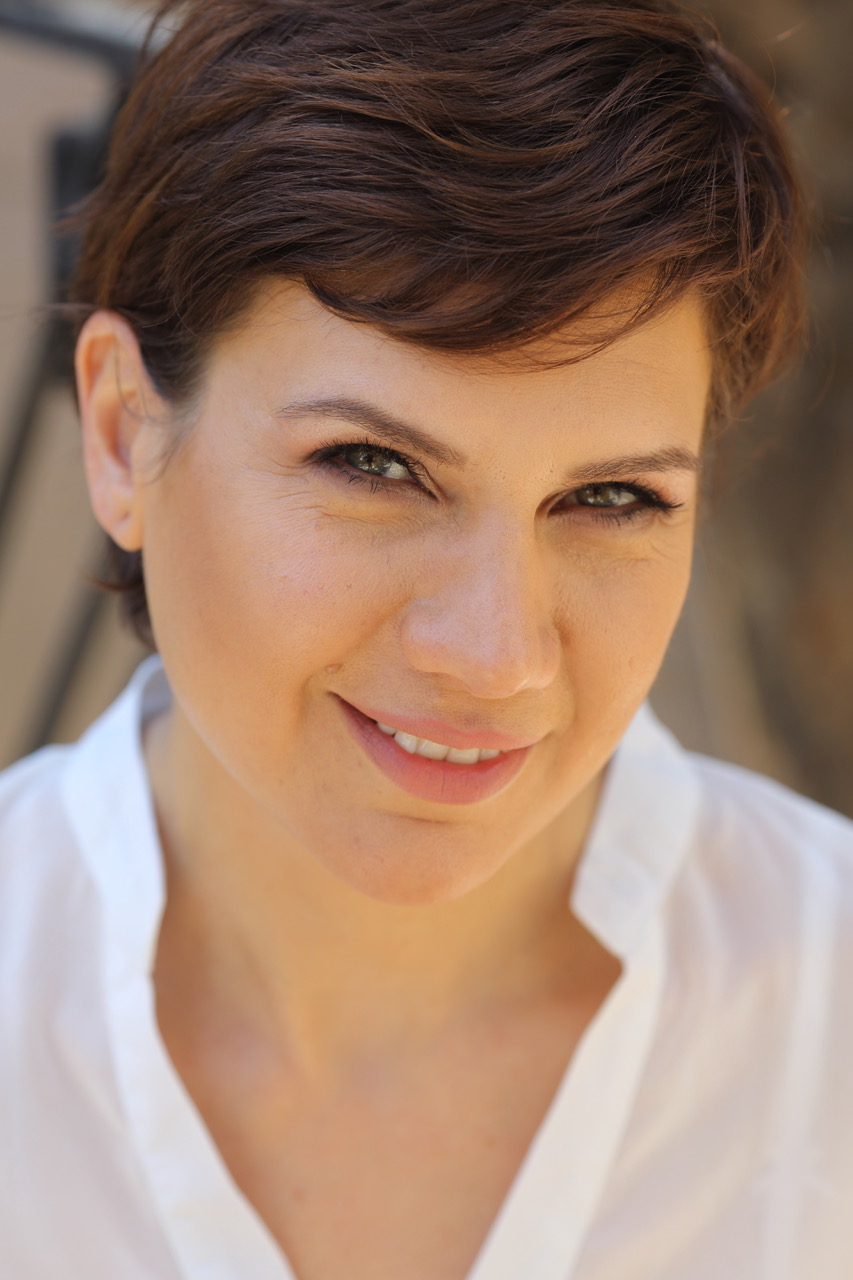
Rania Kurdi

Rania Kurdi (Arabic: رانيا الكردي; born March 11, 1976) is a Jordanian-British Actor, singer and TV presenter. She has had a diverse career in the Middle East spanning over 20 years in TV, film, voice overs, theatre and where she topped the Arab pop music charts.

== Career ==
Kurdi is a graduate of the Guildford School of Acting, studying there from 1993 to 1996. Her first acting role was playing Oliver Twist at the age of 11 in a local stage production.

She reached Pan-Arab success as co-host of SuperStar in Lebanon with production company Fremantle, before moving to Egypt to play the female lead in 2004 romantic comedy Al Hassa Al Sabba alongside actor Ahmad Fishawi.

Kurdi has released two albums, her first with EMI Arabia and her second, Olli Leh with New Century Music where she topped the Arab pop music charts with her song Shayef Nafsak.

In 2013 she became executive producer and writer of her own comedy sketch show The Rania Show which aired for 2 seasons on Roya TV in Jordan. She was subsequently hailed as the Arab Tracey Ullman by Stanford University, where her sketches and Arab characters were used as teaching material.

She moved back to the UK in 2013, where she now lives with her two children. She trained as a professional life coach and continues her acting career. Credits include Nahda at The Bush Theatre, The Vagina Monologues, a Doctors episode (The Invisible Woman), and playing Sofia in the feature film Daphne, directed by Peter Mackie Burns.

She remains active as ambassador to The Children of War Foundation in Jordan and hosted The Anglo Jordanian Society Gala Dinner at The Guildhall to raise money for the children in Syria.

== Early life ==
Kurdi was born in England and raised in Jordan. Her mother was British and her father, an airline pilot, is a Jordanian.

== Discography ==
=== Singles ===
Her singles include:

- Weslsat
- Ana Ana Ana
- Habaitak Ya Lebnan – 2006
- Zgurt – 1998
- Eternally

=== Albums ===
- Rania Kurdi
- Oulli Leh

== Acting ==
=== Films ===
- Al Hassa Al Sabba (The 7th Sense)
- Daphne
- Noor
- El Hasa el Sabaa
- Salma's Home 2022
- Layla 2024

=== TV ===
- The Rania Show
- Doctors
- Albahth Ean Salah Al-deen
- Superstar (host)
- World Idol (host)

=== Theatre ===
- Can't see for looking, Cockpit Theatre, London, 2023
