= Maritta Hallani =

Lebanese singer (born 1997)

Maritta Hallani ماريتا الحلاني
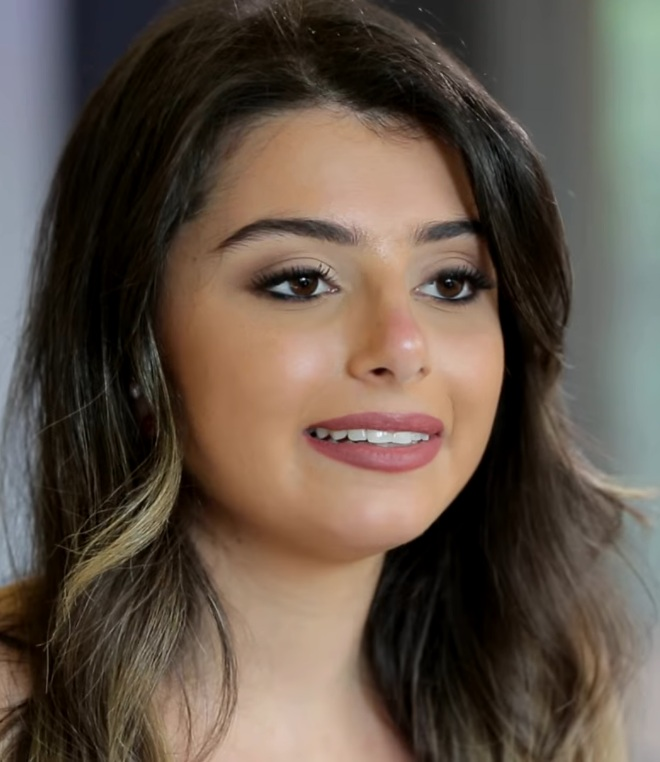

Background information
- Born: Maritta Assi El Hallani; 1 February 1997 (age 29)
- Origin: Beirut, Lebanon
- Genre: Lebanese Music
- Occupation: Singer
- Years active: 2013–present
- Label: AMD Production

Maritta Hallani (Arabic: ماريتا الحلاني; born 1 February 1997) is a Lebanese singer composer, songwriter

== Early life ==
Born in Beirut, Lebanon, Hallani is the daughter of the Lebanese pop singer Assi El Hallani. She began her artistic career at a young age.

== Discography ==
=== Singles ===
- 2016 : Yalla Nefrah
- 2016 : Chou Baddak
- 2017 : Khayfa Anam
- 2017 : Tla'ayna
- 2018 : Go
- 2018 : Nasini
- 2018 : Akher Marra
