= Saad Lamjarred =

Moroccan singer and actor (born 1985)

- سعد لمجرد
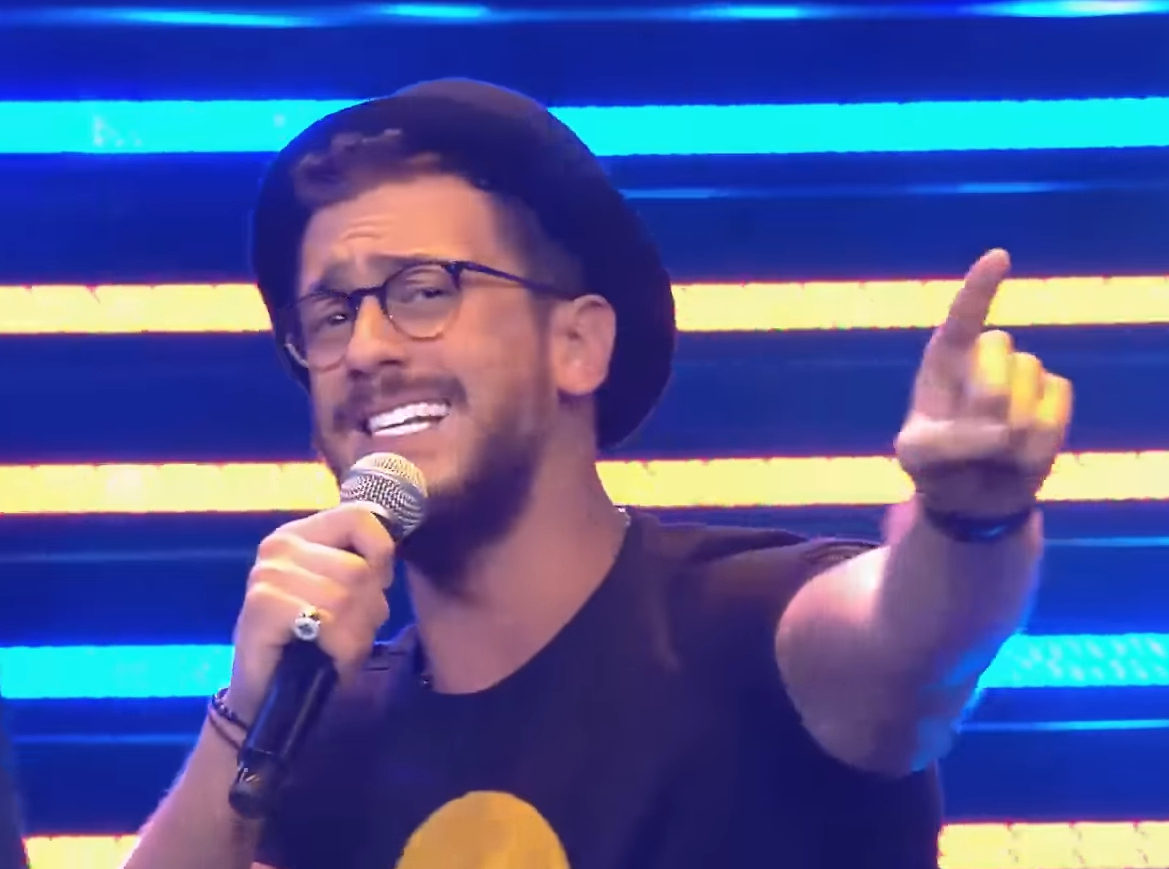
- Lamjarred performing on Star Academy Arabia in 2015
- Born: Saad Bachir Lamjarred سعد البشير لمجرد; 7 April 1985 (age 41); Rabat, Morocco
- Occupations: Actor; rapper; singer-songwriter; record producer
- Years active: 2006–present
- Notable work: "LM3ALLEM"
- Spouse: Ghita El Allaki (m. 2022)
- Musical career
- Genres: Arabic pop (Moroccan pop); Khaliji
- Instruments: Vocals; piano; drums

Signature
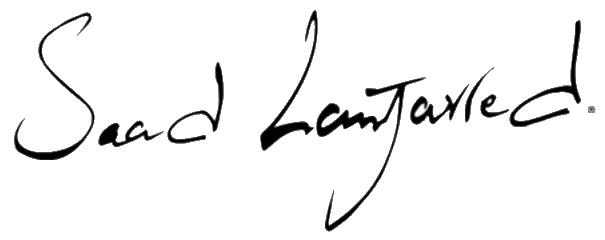

Saad Bachir Lamjarred (Arabic: سعد بشير لمجرد; born 7 April 1985) is a Moroccan singer, songwriter, actor, multi-instrumentalist, dancer, record producer, and convicted rapist. He is widely known for his music video "LM3ALLEM" which received over 1.2 billion views on YouTube, making it the most-viewed Arabic music video on YouTube. His music videos are among the most watched in the MENA region and the most viewed in Morocco.

== Early life ==
Lamjarred was born to Bachir Abdou, a Moroccan classical singer, and Nezha Regragui, an actress and comedian.

From an early age, Lamjarred had a special interest in playing the piano, as well as singing as early as the age of four. He often uses his platform to advocate for various social causes, participating in charity events and initiatives.

Lamjarred then went on to study at the Conservatory of Music in Rabat, where he studied music, art theory and dance. He would perform many productions wherein he would collaborate with his father.

Lamjarred moved to the US in 2001 and cites this as one of the main sources of inspiration for his music, crediting the experience for exposing him to western music and having a defining effect on his style and the type of artist he wanted to identify as.

Lamjarred faces another rape trial in France’s Var Assize Court for a 2018 incident in Saint-Tropez. Past allegations in New York and Casablanca were either dropped or settled, but they remain part of his controversial public profile.

== Career ==
In 2007, Lamjarred took part in Super Star, a widely popular Arab talent TV show, and was placed second in season 4 of the series that was defeated by the Tunisian Marwan Ali. His participation earned him recognition.

In 2011, Lamjarred started his acting career, playing the male lead in Ahlam Nassim, a Moroccan soap opera. He released an album in 2013, titled Wala Aalik. That same year, he released two more EPs, namely Salina and Enty. The title song of the latter, "Enty" (Arabic: أنتي), became one of Lamjarred's biggest hits and earned him an award at the Méditel Morocco Music Awards 2014, as well as a nomination for the Best Middle East Act at the 2014 MTV Europe Music Awards.

Lamjarred was also nominated for the Best Middle East Act at the 2014 MTV Europe Music Awards. He won the Murex d'Or in the category of "Best Arabic Song" for his 2014 song "Enty".

The music video for Lamjarred's 2015 hit single, "Lm3allem" (Arabic: لمعلم), earned a Guinness World Record achievement after garnering over 22 million views on YouTube within three months of release and becoming the most viewed video on YouTube.

A year later, Lamjarred released another single titled "Ana Machi Sahel" (Arabic: أنا ماشي ساهل), which he soon followed up with a black-and-white music video released on YouTube that features dozens of Lamjarred's fans, who have filmed themselves singing along to the song at home, in their cars and out and about. Lamjarred didn't wait too long to release another single by the name of "Ghaltana" (Arabic: غلطانة) in the form of a video clip directed by Amr Rouani. The video caught eyes because of its Wild West, gritty feel, inspired by Rouani's childhood love of Mad Max films.

Following this success, Lamjarred's music production took a brief gap while he was on trial in Paris for sexual assault, but soon made a come-back with his August 2017 comeback titled "Let Go". It was an immediate hit, it earned about half a million views on YouTube within an hour of its release. Lamjarred later released new hit songs such as "Ghazali" (Arabic: غزالي), another big hit that earned more than half a million views only minutes after the video went live at an average of 50 thousand views every five minutes. "Ghazali" was then succeeded by "Casablanca", in which Lamjarred sings in French.

August 2018 saw Lamjarred incarcerated once more in Saint Tropez, halting his music career again until December 2018, in which he released another single, titled "Baddek Eih" (Arabic: بدك ايه). Within 4 hours of publication, the official music video received over a million views on YouTube.

In July 2019, Lamjarred performed and released a duet with Egyptian actor and fellow singer Mohamed Ramadan titled "Ensay" (Arabic: إنساي), which garnered over 100 million views within a month of publication.

On 10 June 2020 Lamjarred reached 10 million subscribers on his official YouTube channel, and becoming the first Arab African singer to get the Diamond Button. In May 2022, his 2015 hit single "Lm3allem" became the first Arabic song to surpass a billion views on YouTube.

In July 2023, Lamjarred appeared and sang the Arabic-Hindi song "Guli Mata" with Indian singer Shreya Ghoshal.

== Personal life ==
There were reports in the media that Lamjarred was once married, and divorced around 2015.

On 11 September 2022, he announced his engagement to businesswoman Ghita El Allaki. They married later in the same month.

== Rape allegations and investigations ==
In February 2010 while visiting the United States, Saad Lamjarred was accused of beating and raping a woman from Brooklyn, New York. Lamjarred fled the U.S. after posting bail and was in risk of being arrested if he returned. The case was dropped in 2016, after the accuser "stopped cooperating with prosecutors" and reached a settlement in a lawsuit.

Lamjarred was arrested at the Marriott Champs Elysées at the 17th arrondissement of Paris on 25 October 2016, where he appeared before a French prosecutor to face the charges about an alleged sexual assault against a French woman. He was scheduled to perform at the Palais des congrès de Paris on 29 October 2016. Lamjarred was released in April 2017, but still faced charges. In early 2017, he was "prohibited from performing in public, traveling and speaking to media". The King of Morocco, Mohammed VI, helped him cover his fees and hire a legal team. In 2017, a French-Moroccan woman accused him of sexual misconduct and abuse at an apartment in Casablanca, Morocco, back in 2015. She later withdrew the complaint "under pressure from her family".

On 26 August 2018 he was once again arrested in Saint-Tropez on a new rape allegation in France. Lamjarred, who has denied the allegations, was released on a bail of 150,000 euros and could not leave France. His release on bail was later appealed by the Parquet of Draguignan (public prosecutor). On 18 September 2018 he was incarcerated in France following a decision of the cour d'appel (court of appeal) from Aix-en-Provence. On 20 November 2018 it was announced that he had been cleared of rape charges, but would be tried for "crimes of sexual assault and willful violence". On 6 December 2018 it was announced that French authorities had released Lamjarred on a conditional release and that he was awaiting trial. His Moroccan passport was confiscated, he was not allowed to leave France and he had to report to the nearest precinct once a week.

In December 2018, he was released from jail after serving his sentence, but was unable to leave France until August 2019. In April 2019, the judge overseeing the case from October 2016 "redefined" the charges against him due to lack of evidence to prove him guilty and referred his case to the criminal court. On 18 December 2019 he had his first public concert in Riyadh after three years. Days before the concert, a number of Saudi users on Twitter expressed their disapproval of Lamjarred's upcoming concert in the country's capital.

In January 2020, the investigative chamber of the Paris Court of Appeal referred the case from October 2016 to the court of assizes. In April 2020, The Paris Court of Cassation annulled the decision made by the investigative chamber as "the code of criminal procedure was not respected and referred the case back to the criminal court.

On 24 February 2023, a court in Paris found Lamjarred guilty of rape by seven votes out of nine (in accordance with French criminal law), and sentenced him to 6 years in prison. Lamjarred denied the charge, claiming that he did not penetrate the victim. He added that he and the victim had kissed and undressed consensually, and that his only violent act was pushing her face away reflexively after she scratched his back, an act which he claims to regret. According to journalist Marine DelaMoisssoniere, the court was convinced that penetration took place, despite the fact that traces of Lamjarred's DNA were only found on the victim's clothes. The court supported its decision also with testimonies of personnel working at the hotel. He was arrested and transferred to prison immediately after the verdict, which garnered protest from his legal defense. Later Lamjarred appealed the court decision, maintaining his innocence. In April 2023, he was granted provisional release.

On 15 May 2026, the Assize Court of Var convicted Lamjarred of rape in connection with the 2018 Saint-Tropez case and sentenced him to five years' imprisonment after a four-day closed trial. Prosecutors had sought a ten-year sentence, while the defense requested acquittal. Lamjarred, who denied the allegations, appealed the conviction on 21 May 2026.

On 26 September 2026, a French appeals court in Créteil convicted Lamjarred of aggravated rape in the 2016 Paris case and sentenced him to ten years in prison, increasing the six-year sentence imposed at his original trial in 2023. The cour d'assises d'appel du Val-de-Marne also ordered his immediate imprisonment. The appeal trial, which lasted eight days and was held behind closed doors at the request of the civil party, followed a postponement in June 2025 to allow further investigation.

=== Reactions ===
Following the third allegation, a campaign started on the social media with the hashtags "Lamjarred out" and "masaktach" (Moroccan Arabic expression meaning "I won't be silenced"), with the users demanding that his songs being taken off the radio stations. 2M and Hit Radio were among the first to take his songs off the airwaves, with the latter saying that they would ask their listeners whether they should keep the ban permanent. In September 2018, after a campaign on social networks, some Moroccan media stopped their broadcast of Lamjarred's songs.

Since 2020, Lamjarred has come under fire from feminists who have attempted—with varying degrees of success—to stop him from performing. This movement started in particular in Egypt. Egyptian feminists also campaigned against Saad Lamjarred's presence in Egypt, with three major campaign waves in 2020, 2021, and 2022. In 2020 on Twitter and Facebook, thousands of Egyptians started a campaign demanding the "Cairo Show" Theatre to cancel Saad Lamjarred's show. The opponents effectively cancelled his concert in December 2020, and an appearance on the Egyptian talk show Sahranin in 2021, but his December 2022 concert took place despite viral campaigns against it.

In 2022, similar campaigns continued to be held in Egypt, Iraq and Lebanon.

== Discography ==
=== Albums ===
Title and details
Wala Aalik (ولا عليك)
- Type: Album
- Released: 2013
Notes

No.	Title	Length
1.	"Wana Mali (Club Edition) – وانا مالي ريميكس"	3:11
2.	"Jiti Fe Bali – جيتي في بالي"	3:41
3.	"Waadini – واعديني"	3:52
4.	"Lemima – لميمة"	3:55
5.	"Aziz Ou Ghali – عزيز وغالي"	3:37
6.	"Salina – سالينا"	4:37
7.	"Lemen Nechki – لمن نشكي"	3:32
8.	"Wala Elik – ولا عليك"	3:33
9.	"Wana Mali – وانا مالي"	3:49
10.	"Katnadini – كتناديني"	3:57
11.	"Chemaa – شمعة"	3:45
12.	"Mal Habibi – مال حبيبي"	3:15

=== Singles ===
- 2009: "Waadini" (واعديني)
- 2012: "Salina Salina" (سلينا سلينا)
- 2014: "Enty" (أنتي)
- 2015: "Lm3allem" (لمعلم)
- 2016: "Ana Machi Sahel" (أنا ماشي ساهل)
- 2016: "Ghaltana" (غلطانة)
- 2017: "Let Go" (ليت غو)
- 2018: "Ghazali" (غزالي)
- 2018: "Ya Allah" (يا الله)
- 2018: "Casablanca"
- 2018: "Baddek Eih" (بدك ايه)
- 2019: "Njibek" (نجيبك)
- 2019: "Ykhalik Lili" (يخليك للي)
- 2019: "Salam" (سلام)
- 2019: "Daba Tzian" (دابا تزيان)
- 2020: "Adda Elkalam" (عدى الكلام)
- 2021: "Lghadi Wehdou" (الغادي وحدو)
- 2021: "Nadi Ya Allah" (نادي يا الله)
- 2022: "Ya Ayouni" (يا عيوني)
- 2022: "Altawbah" (التوبة)
- 2022: "Ma Ahla Lmakan" (ما أحلى المكان)
- 2022: "Alacheq Alhayem" (العاشق الهايم)
- 2022: "El Hala'" (الحلق)
- 2023: "Ach Khbarek" (أش خبارك)
- 2023: "Nour Elsobh" (نور الصبح)
- 2024: "Me7tal El7ob" (محتال الحب)
- 2024: "Ched Ched" (شد شد)
- 2024: "Bashufak" (بشوفك)
- 2024: "Sagfa" (سقفه)
- 2025: "Alama Yabdou" (على ما يبدو)
- 2025: "Zwina Bzzaf" (زوينه بزاف)
- 2025: "Happy Birthday"
- 2025: "Riskin" (ريسكينا)

=== Duets ===
- 2012: "Aziz W Ghali" (عزيز وغالي) – feat. Bachir Abdou
- 2012: "Sa'aa Saaida" (ساعة سعيدة) – feat. Sofia Mountassir
- 2014: "Wana Ma'ak" (وأنا معاك) – feat. Asma Lamnawar
- 2014: "Ya Ensan" (يا إنسان) – feat. Salah Alkurdi
- 2019: "Ensay" (إنساي) – feat. Mohamed Ramadan
- 2020: "Asef Habibi" (آسف حبيبي) – feat. Fnaïre
- 2020: "Chidde W Betzul" (شدت وبتزول) – feat. Salah Kurdi
- 2020: "Bab Alrajaa" (باب الرجاء) – feat. Mohamed Reda
- 2021: "Lewjah Tani" (لوجه التاني) – feat. Zouhair Bahaoui
- 2021: "Sahra Sabahi" (السهرة صباحي) – feat. RedOne and Saber Rebaï
- 2021: "Enty Hayaty" (انتي حياتي) – feat. Calema
- 2022: "Min Awel Dekika" (من أول دقيقة) – feat. Elissa
- 2022: "Viva El Rey Habibna" (عاش حبيبنا الملك) – feat. Nicolas Reyes
- 2023: "Guli Mata" – feat. Shreya Ghoshal
- 2024: "3ndi Fikra" (عندي فكرة) – feat. Yosra Mahnouch
- 2024: "Carrousel" – feat. Enesse
- 2024: "Mahboubi" (محبوبي) – feat. Hatim Ammor
- 2024: "Homa Dol" – feat. Neeti Mohan

=== Charted songs ===
Title	Year	Peak chart position	Album
Title	Year	MENA	Album
"Min Awel Dekika" (featuring Elissa)	2022	16	Non-album singles
"Ach Khbarek"	2023	9	Non-album singles
"Guli Mata" (featuring Shreya Ghoshal)	2023	2	Non-album singles

== Filmography ==
Television

- 2012: Ahlam Nassim

== Awards and nominations ==
Year	Awards	Category	Nominated work	Result
2014	MTV Europe Music Award	Best Song	ENTY	Won
2014	Morocco Music Awards	Best Song	ENTY	Won
2015	Murex d'or	Best Arabic Song	ENTY	Won
2015	DearGuest Award	Best Song	Lm3allem	Won
2016	Murex d'or	Best Male Singer	Saad Lamjarred	Won
2016	Big Apple Music Awards	Best Male Singer	Saad Lamjarred	Won
2016	MTV Africa Music Awards	Listener's Choice	Saad Lamjarred	Won
2017	Anghami	More than 100 millions plays	Saad Lamjarred	Won
2017	Arab Nation Music Awards	Best Moroccan Song	Ghaltana	Won
2017	Arab Nation Music Awards	Best Music Video On YouTube	Ana Machi Sahel	Won
2017	Arab Nation Music Awards	Best Arabic Song	Ghaltana	Won
2017	Murex d'or	Best Arabic Song	Ghaltana	Won
2017	Murex d'or	The People's Choice Award	Saad Lamjarred	Won
2017	daf BAMA Music Awards	Best Song	LET GO	Won
2017	HAPA Music Awards	Best African Artist	Saad Lamjarred	Won
2017	Morocco Music Awards	Best Music Video	LET GO	Won
2018	Africa Music Awards	Best Male Northern Artist	Saad Lamjarred	Won
2024	Billboard Awards	Best Song Moroccan	Guli Mata	Won
