= Diana Karazon =

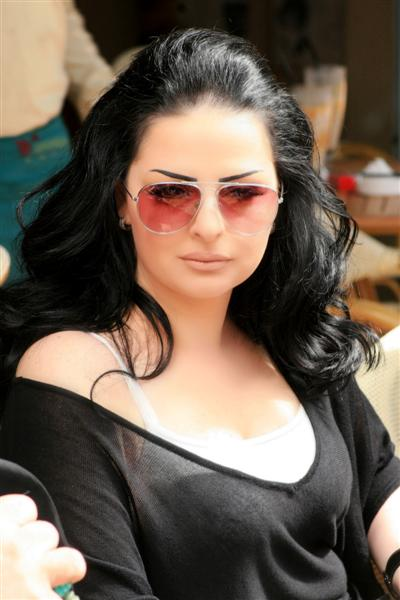
- Karazon in 2009

Background information
- Born: Diana Mohamed Sameeh Karazon ديانا محمد سميح كرزون; October 30, 1983 (age 43); Kuwait City, Kuwait
- Origin: Jordan
- Genre: Jordanian music
- Occupations: Singer, talk show host and actress
- Years active: 2003–present
- Labels: Alam elPhan, Mazzika
- Website: www.dianakarazon.ws

Diana Karazon (Arabic: ديانا كرزون; born October 30, 1983) is a Jordanian singer of Arabic pop, television host, and actress. She won Superstar (2003), the Arabic version of Pop Idol.

Karazon was born in Kuwait City, Kuwait. In 2010 during her visit to Erbil, she said her maternal uncles’ family is original Kurdish. She said after visiting Erbil she is even more proud of her Kurdish heritage and the Kurdish side of her family.

== Singles ==
- 2003 insani ma binsak
- 2003 elshar barra w baed
- 2004 omri lw lilah
- 2005 El Omr Mashi
- 2005 lamma teba habibi
- 2006 ah bemazagy
- 2007 w badat aiesh
- 2007 inta mashi bgad
- 2007 hibni dom
- 2007 Asemt alzaman
- 2007 mahabetnesh
- 2008 kalam alain
- 2008 Operate Live Show in Khartoum – SUDAN (Hansa3edhoum) (We Will Help Them, Our Children) Song Wrote By Mohamed Almohaned Hassan Dabora
- 2008 yalla olha
- 2009 resalat insan a message to Barack Obama
- 2009 Jarh
- 2009 momkin ansak
- 2009 shaif alai nafsak
- 2010 enta al gharam
- 2010 fe had eshtakalak
- 2010 wesh el tary
- 2010 Rasak Bel Aaly
- 2010 adet layaly
- 2010 Tartelat al Om Alhazena – Words from sad Mother.
- 2010 Hala Ya Ordonieh
- 2011 Kazzeb Alye – Lie To Me.
- 2012 elkaddab el kebeer
- 2012 awal shetwe b amman
- 2012 Mazzika hadya

== Discography ==
- 2003 Super Star El Arab
- 2005 El Omr Mashi
- 2008 October 14, 2008 Cancer Children Assosation(99199) – Big Concert in Khartoum (Idea of Eng. Mohamed Almohaned Hassan Dabora as Creative Manager & he Also wrote The Song Of Hansa3edhom (We Will Help Our Children).
- 2010 Diana 2010
- 2010 Rasak Bel Aaly (Special National Patriotic album dedicated to Jordan)

== Filmography ==
- 2003 SuperStar
- 2004 Win with Diana
- 2009 Deut with Diana
- 2010 Aldef defak
- 2010 Montaha Aleshq Egyptian TV series
- 2010 attajroba real life experience
- 2011 Nouna alma`azona as her self

== Superstar performances ==
Top 55: أكذب عليك (Akdib Aleyk) by Warda
Top 12:
Top 10:
Top 8: آه يا ليل (Ah Ya Leel) by Ragheb Alama
Top 7: إبعتلي جواب (Iba'atli Jawab) by Nour Mehana
Top 6: ألف ليلة وليلة (Alf Leela W Leela) by Umm Kulthum
Top 5: دنيا الوله (Dinya Min El Wala) by Abdallah Al Rowaished
Top 4: أنا في انتظارك (Ana Fi Entazarak) by Umm Kulthum
Top 4: مغرومة (Maghroume) by Najwa Karam
Top 3: أكذب عليك (Akdib Aleyk) by Warda
Top 3: البوسطه (El Posta) by Fairuz
Top 3:
Grand Final: لسا فاكر (Lissa Faker) by Umm Kulthum
Grand Final:
Grand Final: تعا ننسى (Ta'a Ninsa) by Melhem Barakat

Preceded by None	SuperStar; Winner; Season 1 (2003)	Succeeded by Ayman El Aatar
