= Jad Shwery =

Jad Shwery جاد شويري
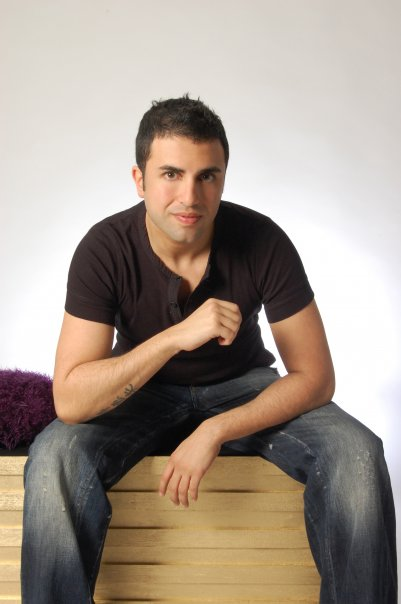

Background information
- Born: 13 March 1980 (age 46)
- Origin: Lebanese
- Genre: Pop
- Occupations: Singer, director, songwriter and producer
- Website: www.jadshwery.com

Jad Shwery (usually spelled: Jad Choueiri; Arabic: جاد شويري Lebanese pronunciation: [ʒaːd ˈʃweːɾi], born 13 March 1984) is a Lebanese pop singer, songwriter, producer and music video director.

== Musical career ==
Right after his university years in ALBA academie libanaise des beaux-arts and La Sorbonne Nouvelle Paris 3, Jad participated in The Studio El Fan contest of 2002 and won the first prize in the directing category for the music video he directed of "Ya Mustafa" by Reeda Butros. In 2004, Jad wrote his first song "a2olak eh" and shot its video. The song was a strong club hit that flew to the top of many charts around the Arab world. Jad's success caused some controversy because of the new style it introduced but many doors opened for him as he was asked to direct some videos as well as produce and write other artists' records. But most importantly Jad got offered a record deal by Melody music and became managed by Melody artist management.

His follow-up record "2olly Ezay" proved to be an even bigger hit, and Jad started performing all over the Arab world. His first album El Mouftah came next, gathering all the previous hits along with "Banadeelak" that took the Arabic charts by storm. His biggest hit was yet to come. "Warrini", a duet with Malak el Nasser became one of the most popular songs of 2006 in many countries in the Middle East. He has introduced many things to the Arabic pop industry as he was the first male artist to do a choreographed dance during his performances or put Arabic rapping into the mainstream.

In April 2009, Jad released his single "Funky Arabs" to be the first single off his English album. The controversy regarding the video has been running ever since, especially on YouTube, but it did not stop the video from being broadcast on BNN in the Netherlands, as well as being selected in the Arab film festival in Parramatta, New South Wales, Australia. Later on that year he released "Wala Awel" followed up by "Ghaly" as the first songs from his second Arabic album. The video was shot in Paris, London, New York and Disneyland with the help of Jad's brother and sister Ralph and Ingrid Choueiri. Although he was continuously criticized for his limited vocal capabilities, even the most skeptic detractors had to acknowledge the successful performances he gave around the MENA. His two concerts in Casablanca – Morocco on the 15 and 16 July that year gathered 40,000 people on the first night and 70,000 on the second. On 26 August 2011 "Kassaretly El Siyara"(his first official release in the Lebanese dialect) was released along with a music video that featured a new dabke dance style highlighting the electronic break beat of the song. It helped the song become a success and promote the upcoming album. On 13 September, Jad released his second album, Eshha Keda which was co-produced by Melody and Mira stars. He performed the album at the Riviera Hotel on 14 September, along with all his previous hits and some covers, in a rock-solid and modern choreographed show which was attended by a big number of local celebrities. "Mesh ayez gherak" and "Eshha Keda" were the following singles but failed to get the hype of the first release from that album. The Arab Spring in Egypt was primarily the reason behind that – especially that Melody itself had closed its doors. In 2013 Jad released an English song called "we don't care" that was popular on the club scene and in English speaking circles. In 2015, Jad decided to get back to the front of the music scene with a new vision of his persona: more of a producer/performer with collaborating artists than the classical pop singer. The result was "Agaza", a powerful duet with Egypt's big rising star Pousy. The song, written by Jad, flew to the top of the charts in most Arab countries and re-established Jad as a pop phenomenon. The "Best contemporary artist" award he received at the Murex d'or that year is a solid proof of the impact of his comeback. Several collaborations followed like "Barra" with Hind Al Bahrainia (2017) and "Ma fish keda" with Lola Jaffan (2018) and "El Seet" 2024 with Sohayla erasing the line between his persona as a director/producer and performer.

Now, Jad is dedicated to his come back in celebration of 20 years of his career. His new album is titled "BALBALA" to highlight the controversy that always followed him throughout his journey. 3 new singles were debuted: "BALBALA", "Tab Toz (feat Nassar)", and "Taii Ntir (Feat Ehab El Qawasmi)" along with a remake of one of Shwery's old songs "El Sekkah El Ghalat".

== Direction and production career ==
The first video that turned Jad into a star director, capable of transforming any product into a phenomenon, was undoubtedly "Elaab" by Maria. Many new artists have asked Jad to direct their videos or produce their records since. But Jad remained in a certain style of entertaining, sometime controversial type of videos until he completely changed that image with Johanna Mallah's "Hatefdal fi Albi". "Wala fi el ahlam" by Iwan "bahibak awi" by Nicole Saba and "Bartah Maak" by Amr Mostafa followed and established Jad as a romantic music video director as well. Jad's reputation as a "starmaker" lead production house Endemol to ask him to be one of the jury producers in a talent show contest on Abu Dhabi TV in 2008.

In 2010 Jad's directing career took a turning point. After working with artists like Micheline khalife, Dina Hayek and Fella, he was chosen to direct the first solo video of the legendary icon Wadih el Safi. The music video gained both critics and viewers respect. In 2012 Jad directed megastars Diana Haddad and Nawal el zoghbi's new videos. Both were unanimously successful, "gharibi hal denyi" by Nawal Al Zoghbi counting around 4million YouTube hits (a couple of months after its release).

Jad stayed away from the music scene for a while, concentrating on his career as a producer/director and worked with big pop stars in the likes of Yara Cyrine Abdelnour, Nassif Zeytoun, Recently, Jad has worked with the legend George Wassouf and directed the music video of his single "Raksa Espani". Now, he is focused on his new album "BALBALA" and the music videos for the first two singles "BALBALA" and "Tab Toz (feat Nassar)" were directed by Shwery himself.

== Song Writing Career ==
Shwery wrote many of his songs himself starting with "Aolak Eh" and "Olli Ezay" in 2004, "Banadilak" and "El Moftah" in 2005, "Masreya" in 2007, "Funky arabs" and "Wala Awel" in 2009. Then, you have "Ghali" in 2010, "Kasaretly El Sayarah" in 2011, and "We don't Care" in 2013. Later on, Jad wrote "Agaza (Feat Pousy)" in 2015, and lastly "BALBALA" in 2026.

When it comes to songs for other artists, Jad has a significant fingerprint. He was behind many loved songs: "Barra" (2017) by Hind Al Bahrainya, "Mafish Keda (feat Jad Shwery)" (2018) by Lola Jafan, "Doctor Fi El Hob" by Walid Tawfik (2022), and the hit song "Ganeni" by Elyanna (2024). He also co-wrote Elyanna's latest bop "Bosa" 2026.

== Video clips ==
Video/ Song	Director	Year
Aollak Eh? (Tell You What?)	Jad Shwery	2004
El Mazzika	Jad Shwery	2004
Oully Ezzay (Tell Me How)	Jad Shwery	2004
Banadilak (I'm Calling You)	Jad Shwery	2005
Meen Allek? (Who told you?)	Amir kreidiye	2005
Warrini (Show me) (featuring Malak Naser)	Jad Shwery & Malak Naser	2006
Masria (Egyptian Girl)	Jad Shwery	2007
Funky Arabs (First English Song)	Jad Shwery & Yahya Saade	2009
Stop Popping Pills	Jad Shwery	2009
Wala Awel (neither the first)	Jad Shwery	2009
Ghaly (Dear)	Jad Shwery	2010
Kassaretly El Siyara (She Broke My Car)	Jad Shwery	2011
Mesh ayez gherak (no one else but you)	Jad Shwery	2012
Eshha keda (live it like that)	Robert Cremona	2012
We don't care.	Jad Shwery	2013
Agaza	Jad Shwery	2015
Barra! (Out!) (feat. Hind)	Jad Shwery	2017
Ma Fish Kida (feat. Lola Jaffan)	Jad Shwery	2018
Mesh Ay Kalam	Jad Shwery	2019
Mashi (feat. Jamal Yassine & Rami Chalhoub)	Jad Shwery	2020
Walhan (feat. Yazan Kamel)	Jad Shwery	2021
Dr. Fel Hob (Walid Toufic & Jad Shwery)	Jad Shwery	2022
3esha B Mazag (Jad Shwery, Houda Bondok, Tiara Waheb)	Jad Shwery	2022
Halalalala	Jad Shwery	2023
El Seet (feat Sohayla)	Jad Shwery	2024
Rageen ya Eskendereya (feat Carolina Karam)	Jad Shwery	2025
Balbala	Jad Shwery	2026
Tab Toz (feat Nassar)	Jad Shwery	2026

== Directed by Jad Shwery ==
Artist	Video/ Song	Year
Boo D Boo	Meen Gharrak	2004
Maria	Elaab	2005
Maria	Betekdeb Alaya	2005
Iwan	Wala Fe El Ahlam	2005
Joanna Mallah	Hatefdal Fi Alby	2006
Amr Moustafa	Bartah Ma'ak	2007
Maria	Baheb El Maas	2009
Maria	Bahebak Ad Eih	2009
Maria	Stop - Ta'ala Bas	2009
Nicole Saba	Bahibak Awy	2011
Diana Haddad	Albi Wafi	2012
Rosy	Daket Mehbajek	2013
Nawal El Zoghbi	Gharibi Hal Denyi	2013
Jana	Dars Khsousi	2014
Rahma Riad	Bosa	2014
Yara	Ayech Bi Oyouni	2014
Rahma Riad	Anoudi	2015
Yara	Beyt Habibi	2015
Yara	Sah Btadena	2015
Jana	Bint Gdida	2015
Cyrine Abdel Nour	Aadi	2015
Nassif Zeytoun	Nami Aa Sadri	2015
Joe Ashkar	Jern El kebbe	2016
Nassif Zeytoun	Adda W Edoud	2016
Naji Osta	Kel El Nas Btekbar	2016
Reem Al Sharif	To'mor Amor	2016
Lola Jaffan	Chocolata	2016
Nawal El Zoghbi	Bhebo Ktir	2017
Joseph Attieh	Omer Aasal	2018
Joseph Attieh	Bi Ouyouni	2019
Adonis	Ma Betmannalak	2019
Lola Jaffan	Law Amet El Iyama	2020
Cyrine Abdel Nour	Leila	2020
Carol Samaha	Mosh Ha Eish	2020
Jad Shwery (feat. Jamal Yassine & Rami Chalhoub)	Mashi	2020
Jad Shwery (feat. Hala Al Turk)	Layali El Seif	2021
Joe Ashkar	Ghenwet Hobb	2021
Jad Shwery (feat. Yazan Kamel)	Walhan	2021
Joseph Attieh	Tabii	2021
Maya Diab	Ahlan Wa Sahlan	2021
Rami Chalhoub	Biwatani	2021
Lea Sham	Dounyetna	2021
Melissa	Layali Omri	2021
Brigitte Yaghi	Kan Bena Kteer	2022
Walid Toufic & Jad Shwery	Dr. Fel Hob	2022
Yazan kamel	Ma Tfel	2022
Jad Shwery (Houda Bondok & Tiara Waheb)	3eshha B Mazag	2022
Jad Shwery	Halalala	2023
Moustafa Hagag	El Nas Ghadara	2024
Jad Shwery and Sohayla	El Seet	2024
George Wassouf	Raksa Espani	2026
Jad Shwery	Balbala	2026
Jad Shwery (feat Nassar)	Tab Toz	2026

== Discography ==
- 2005: El Moftah
- 2011: Eshha Keda
- Independent Singles: Warriny, Masria, Funky Arabs, Stop popping pills, We don't care, Agaza
- 2026: BALBALA
