= Maher Charif =

Palestinian historian

Lecturer and Researcher on Medieval, Modern, and Arab History at the French Near East Institute in Syria

Member of the Central Committee of the Palestinian People's Party

Personal details
- Party: Palestinian People's Party
- Occupation: Historian
- Profession: Lecturer and researcher

Maher Charif (Arabic: ماهر الشريف, transliterated Mahir ash-Sharif) is a Palestinian Marxist historian specialising in modern Arab intellectual history and the history of Arab political movements. He is working as a lecturer and researcher on medieval, modern, and Arab history at the French Near East Institute in Syria.

Charif is a Palestinian refugee born in Damascus, Syria to a Palestinian father and a Syrian mother. He has been a member of the Central Committee of the Palestinian People's Party, and is a commentator on politics and society in Arab newspapers.

His works include:

- Al-bahth 'an kiyan (The Search for an Entity), on the ideological evolution of Palestinian political movements
- Filastin fi-l-arshif as-sirri li-l-komintern (Palestine in the Secret Archive of the Comintern)
- Rihanat an-nahda fi-l-fikr al-'arabi (The Stakes of the Nahda in Arab Thought)
- Tayar al-islah ad-dini wa-masa'irihi fi-l-mujtama'at il-'arabiyya (The Religious Reformist Current and its Future in Arab Societies) conference papers, co-edited with Salam al-Kawakibi.
- Tatawwur mafhoum al-jihad fi-l-fikr al-islami (The Development of the Concept of Jihad in Islamic Thought)
