= Melhem Zein =

Lebanese singer (born 1982)

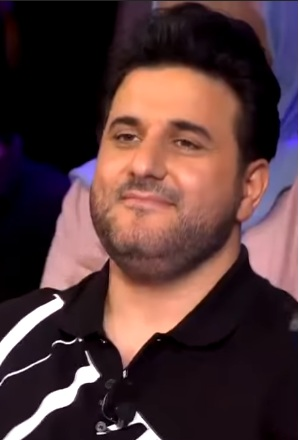
- Born: Melhem Hussein Jasem Zein ملحم حسين جاسم زين; 21 October 1982 (age 43); Lebanon
- Occupation: Singer
- Spouse: Tamani Ali Salem al-Beidh
- Children: 4

Melhem Zein (Arabic: ملحم زين; born 21 October 1982) is a Lebanese singer.

== Career ==
When he was 16, Melhem Hussein Zein first participated in an Amateur Singing Program called Kaas Al Nojoum (The Cup of the Stars) on the Lebanese LBC Channel for singing Mohammed Abd El Wahhab's "Ya Jarat Al Wadi" (The Neighbor of the Valley).

He came in third in Super Star 1, the Pan-Arab version of Pop Idol.

== Personal life ==
Melhem is married to Tamani Ali Salem al-Beidh, the daughter of Ali Salem al-Beidh. He has four children.

== Discography ==
- 2004 Enti Msheetee
- 2006 Badde Hebbik
- 2008 Aallawah
- 2012 Melhem Zein 2012
- 2017 Dal3oona (دلعونا)
- 2017 El Jereh Elli Baadou

== Singles ==
- 2015 "Lama El Haki" For the Lebanese movie called Shi Yom Rah Fell
- 2015 "Andak Hiwaii"
