= Ibrahim El Hakami =

Saudi singer (born 1979)

- Born: May 2, 1979 (age 46)
- Origin: Mouzhera, Jizan, Saudi Arabia
- Genres: Saudi Arabian, Arabic music
- Occupation: Singer
- Website: ibrahimelhakami.com

Ibrahim El Hakami (Arabic: ابراهيم الحكمي; born May 2, 1979) is a Saudi singer who rose to popularity around the world as the winner of Super Star 3, the pan-Arabic version of Pop Idol. Ibrahim won with 53% of the total vote against Shahd Barmada from Syria.

Ibrahim names Faiza Ahmad and Thekra as his main musical inspirations.

== Super Star Performances ==
- Top 21: أكذب عليك (Akdib Aleyk) by Warda
- Top 12: انا الشاكي (Ana El Shaki) by Hussain Al Jassmi
- Top 11: الغالي (El Fali) by Said Makawi
- Top 10: اللي نسيك انساه (Elli Naseek Insa'a) by Abdallah El Rowaished
- Top 10: ليل و رعد أو برد (Leel W Rahd W Bard) by Wael Kfoury
- Top 8: أنا ناطر (Ana Nater) by Nabil Shaeil
- Top 7: الحب الكبير (El Hob El Kebir) by Ragheb Alama
- Top 6: اختلفنا (Ekhtalafna) by Mohamed Abdou
- Top 5: موال (Mawal)
- Top 5: البوسطة (El Posta) by Fairouz
- Top 5: حرمت أحبك (Haramt Ahibak) by Warda
- Top 5: ما يسوى (Ma Yiswa) by Hussain Al Jassmi
- Top 3: بترحلك مشوار (Btrohlek Mishwar) by Wadih El Safi
- Top 3: بعيد عنك (Ba'eed Anak) by Umm Kulthum
- Top 3: وترحل (Weterhal) by Talal Meddah
- Grand Final: ياللي تاعبنا (Yalli Ta'abna) by George Wassouf
- Grand Final: اعترف لك (Ehtraflik) by Mohamed Abdou
- Grand Final: سألوني الناس (Salouni El Nas) by Fairuz
- Grand Final Results Show: سمّعني غنية (Samani Ghaniya) by Abdul Majid Abdullah

Preceded by Ayman El Aatar	Super Star; Winner; Season 3 (2006)	Succeeded by Marwan Ali
