= Jaroudi Media =

- Founded: 2011
- Founder: Youssef Jaroudi
- Genre: Arabic Music
- Location: Beirut, Lebanon
- Official website: http://www.Jaroudi.me/

Jaroudi Media (Arabic: جارودي ميديا) is a Lebanese record label founded by the Businessman Youssef Jaroudi. The company was founded in late 2011.

== Known Artists ==
- Nancy Nasrallah
- Georges Al Rassi
- Michel Azzi
- Kamil Chamoun

== See also ==
- List of record labels
