= Brigitte Yaghi =

Lebanese pop singer (born 1987)

Brigitte Yaghi بريجيت ياغي
- Born: Brigitte Yaghi; 19 November 1987 (age 38)
- Origin: Beirut, Lebanon
- Genres: Arab pop, Arab Tarab, Arabic music, Lebanese music, Middle Eastern music
- Occupations: Actress, singer, musician, songwriter
- Years active: 2006–present

Brigitte Yaghi (Arabic: بريجيت ياغي; born 19 November 1987) is a Lebanese pop singer and actress. She finished in fifth place in SuperStar, the Arabic version of American Idol or Pop Idol.

== Early life ==
Yaghi was born in Beirut, Lebanon and is that daughter of famous Lebanese singer Abdo Yaghi. At 16 she entered into SuperStar, an Arabic edition of American Idol and finished in 5th place. Following her departure from Super Star 2, Brigitte went on to release her first single, Alby W Omry

== Discography ==
=== Singles ===
- W b2ellak shi
- Mech Masmouh
- Albi w 3omri
- Ghajariya
- Maak
- Lawla Hobbak
- Min Awal Youm

== Videography ==
Official Music Videos
Year	Title	Album	Director
2005	"Maak"	Single	Samir Abd El Maseih
2007	"Lawla Hobbak"	Single	Said El Marouk
2009	"Alby W Omry"	Single	Ray Kay
2016	"W B2ellak Shi"	Single	Nassif Al Rayess
