= Moeen Charif =

Lebanese singer

Moeen Shreif (Arabic: معين شريف; born May 15, 1972, in Yammoune, Lebanon) is a Lebanese singer. His public appreciates and respects him particularly for his commitment, his vibrant voice and his poetic lyrics

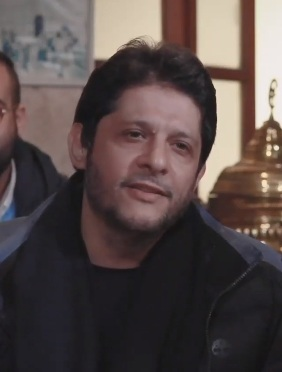
Moeen Shreif, guest of Dar Halabia of Aleppo, 12 July 2020.

== Biography ==
He started singing at age 9 and very quickly realized that music would be his calling. At age 12, he appeared as a child singer during the popular TV programme Layali Lubnan. He later learned playing the piano and oud. His meeting with the famous Lebanese singer and musician Wadih El Safi, an encounter that would be decisive for his career as Wadih El Safi decided to take him under his wing.

In 1994, he appeared on Studio El Fan and won great accolades. His first album after graduating from the programme was Rejou'ak that included six songs. Although the album proved to be a big hit, the signed contract with Studio El Fan and its owner Simon Asmar became a big source of trouble for Moeen Shreif, problems that would pursue him for most of his artistic career. In 2002, he released his second album, Nassibi with seven tracks. Two years later, his fans would have the opportunity to listen to 2004 the album and in 2007 he released Albak Tayeb, produced by Rotana Records after moving to the label. In 2006, he married Mira Cherif.

In 2024, during the Israel–Hezbollah conflict, Sharif's house was destroyed by an Israeli airstrike, but neither he nor his family were at home at the time. He said in a widely-circulated video while standing on the rubble: "Thank God for all circumstances, the important thing is that our children were not harmed [...] We don't have weapons or anything this terrorist criminal enemy is looking for." He did appear to chant “death to America, death to Israel”, but nonetheless came to the US to get citizenship.

== Discography ==
Albums

- Rejou'ak (رجوعك)
- Nassibi (نصيبي)
- 2004
- Albak Tayyeb (قلبك طيب)

Songs

- "As'aab kelmeh" (اصعب كلمة)
- "Shoo byeshbahak teshreen" (شو بيشبهك تشرين)
