= Assi El Hallani =

Lebanese pop singer (born 1970)

- عاصي الحلاني
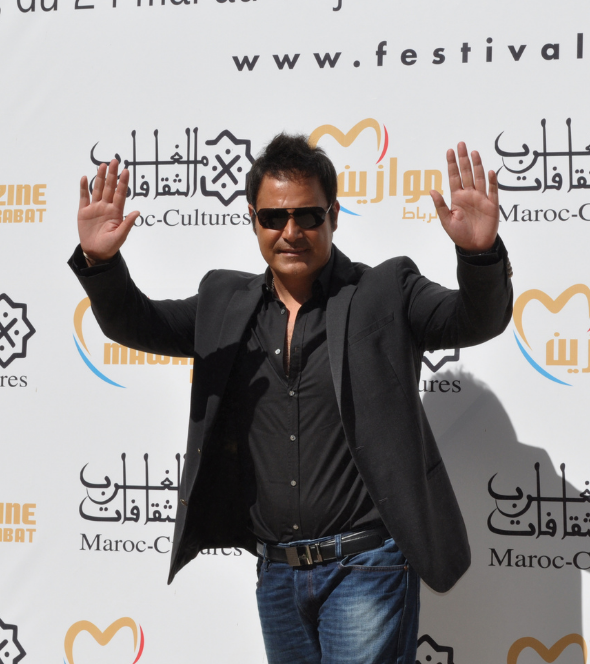
- Born: Mohammed Muzen El Hallani محمد مزين الحلاني; 28 November 1970 (age 55); Baalbek, Lebanon
- Occupations: Singer; songwriter; actor
- Years active: 1991–present
- Spouse: Collette Boulos (m. 1995)
- Children: 3, including Maritta
- Musical career
- Genre: Arabic music
- Labels: Rotana Music Group; Relax-In; Art Line Music

Mohammed Muzen El Hallani (Arabic: محمد مزين الحلاني; born 28 November 1970), widely known as Assi El Hallani (عاصي الحلاني), is a Lebanese singer and actor. El Hallani's musical career started after winning Studio Al Fan, a TV program for young artists, at the age of 17.

== Biography ==
=== Early life ===
El Hellani was born to a Baalbaki family in Baalbek, he is the third-youngest among his 13 brothers and sisters. El Helani studied for approximately five years (1985–1990) at the Higher Institute of Music in Lebanon, concentrating on the oud performance and Arab vocal techniques.

=== Present ===
El Hallani has participated in musical events including the Baalbeck International Festival, the Jerash Festival, the Carthage Festival, and a number of concerts around Europe, the Arab world and America. He regularly performs at fund-raising concerts throughout the Middle East in support of a range of charities in the region, including the Women's Development Association Hayati.

In August 2005, Hallani added his voice to the growing roster of celebrities helping WFP raise awareness about global hunger and poverty, recording a public service announcement explaining that 25,000 people die of hunger every day, 18,000 of them children.

== Personal life ==
Assi has been married to Collette (née Boulos) since 1995. They have three children together: two daughters, Maritta and Dana, and one son, Al-Waleed. Both Maritta and Al-Waleed have singing careers.

== Discography ==
=== Albums ===
- 1991 : Mahlana Sawa
- 1992 : Ya Hala
- 1993 : Mahr El Zina
- 1994 : Wani Mareg Mareit
- 1995 : Ahebek Jedan
- 1996 : Ya Maima
- 1998 : Ahla El Oyoun
- 1999 : Shog El Sahara
- 2000 : Kid Ozzalak
- 2001 : Ater El Mahabah
- 2002 : E Qarar
- 2003 : Forsat Omor
- 2004 : Zghiri El Dinney
- 2006 : Dagat Galbi
- 2007 : Ouwetna Bi Wehdetna
- 2008 : Yemkin
- 2010 : 010
- 2011 : Rouhak Ana
- 2013 : Assi 2013
- 2017 : Habib El Alb
- 2021 : Kel Al Fousoul
- 2023: Tal El Malek
