= Ahmad Chhadeh =

Lebanese music producer, social media expert, Founder and CEO of Arabsong Production

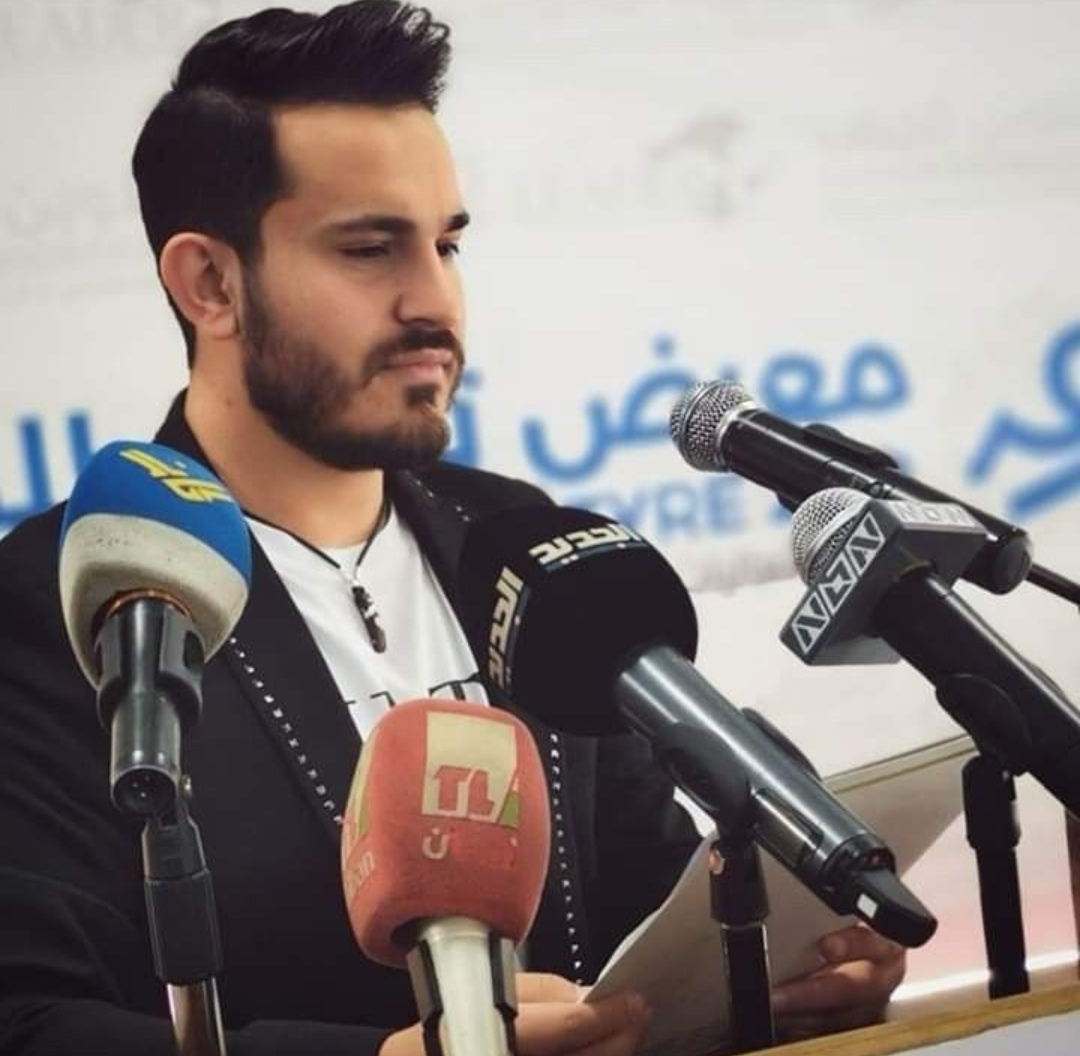

Background information
- Born: Ahmad Chhadeh أحمد شحادة; 3 October 1992 (age 34); Maaroub, Lebanon
- Occupations: music producer, social media expert, Founder and CEO of Arabsong Production

Ahmad Chhadeh (Arabic: أحمد شحادة; born 16 October 1992) is a Lebanese music producer and a social media expert. He is also the founder and CEO of Arabsong Production (Arabic: عرب سونغ للإنتاج الفني). He won many awards.

== Life and career ==
At an early age, Chhadeh founded his own company Arabsong Production (Arabic: عرب سونغ للإنتاج الفني) where he dealt with well-known artists such as Sherine, Marwan Khoury, Adam, Muhammad El Majzoub, Jad Ezzddine, Rola Kadri, Jad Khalife and many others. In 2012, Chhadeh began his career as a singer after he released more than one song, including one for the Lebanese football team, after being on the verge of qualifying for the FIFA World. In 2013, Chhadeh entered the world of management and web - pages, and he was able to discover many policy gaps and technological deficiencies in social media sites such as WhatsApp and Instagram. In 2021, Chhadeh has awarded the Best Social Media Expert and E-Commerce Awards by Beirut Golden Award during the Nations Festival Day. He also won the Best Young Entrepreneur Award for 2021 by Beirut Golden Award during Miss Humanity Beauty Contest.

== Awards ==
- Winner of the Best Social Media Expert 2021
- Winner of E-Commerce Award 2021
- Winner of the Best Young Entrepreneur Award for 2021
