= The X Factor (Arabic TV series) =

Television series

- Also known as: MBC The X Factor
- Created by: Simon Cowell
- Presented by: Nathalie Maamary (1); Charbel Raji (Xtra Factor 1); Joelle Rahme (2); Yosra El Lozy (3); Bassel Alzaro (3–4); Daniella Rahme (4); Wael Mansour (Xtra Factor 4); Sheema (5-6)
- Judges: Nelly (1); Khaled El Sheikh (1–2); Michel Elefteriades (1–2); Anoushka (2); Carole Samaha (3); Wael Kfoury (3); Hussain Al Jasmi (3); Elissa (3–4); Ragheb Alama (4–6); Donia Samir Ghanem (4); Angham (5); Abdallah Al Rowaished (5); Rahma Riad (6); Fayez Al Saeed (6)
- Country of origin: Arab World
- No. of seasons: 6

Production
- Producers: Rotana; CBC; SYCOtv; MBC; INMedia Plus; Future Media Company; Imagic Group; Syco Entertainment; FremantleMedia; Mformedia
- Running time: 60–120 minutes

Original release
- Network: Rotana Mousica (1–2); Rotana Khalejia (3); MTV Lebanon (3); CBC (3); MBC4 (4); MBC Masr (4); Dubai TV (5-6)
- Release: 26 March 2006 - 2007; 21 February 2013 - 24 May 2013; 14 March 2015 - 13 June 2015; 3 September 2023 - 10 February 2025

The X Factor Arabia, originally aired on March 26, 2006, with the title XSeer Al Najah (meaning Elixir or Essence of Success) is the Arab version of The X Factor. The Arabic-language version of the program also created by Simon Cowell has a similar format to the British version, in that there are judges who each have a team of contestants to mentor and compete with each other for the X Factor title. The 14-episode first series was broadcast in 22 Arabic-speaking countries. In its debut, it was known as being one of the most watched programs on television and was produced and supported by Rotana, one of the largest production companies in the Arab World. The winner of XSeer Al Najah earned a chance to sign with Rotana. However, with the continuing success of the rival pan-Arab series Star Academy on Lebanese Broadcasting Corporation (LBC), XSeer All Najah lost most of its pan-Arab appeal and was discontinued after season 2.

In 2012, the Egyptian TV channel CBC announced that The X Factor Arabia would return in 2013 with four judges: Elissa, Carole Samaha, Wael Kfoury, and Hussain Al Jasmi. Despite its revamped format, The X Factor Arabia struggled against its rival show MBC's Arab Idol which aired at the same time slot as The X Factor.

In 2014, MBC brought the rights for the show from CBC, revamped its format and started producing season four. Only Elissa as a judge and Bassel Alzaro as a host were retained from season three during MBC's restructure of the show. The judges on MBC The X Factor are Ragheb Alama, Elissa and Donia Samir Ghanem. The first episode aired on 14 March 2015 on MBC1 and MBC Masr.

In 2023, Dubai Media (Dubai TV) acquired the rights to produce and broadcast The X Factor in the Arab world. The 2023 panel featured Lebanese superstar Ragheb Alama, Egyptian singer Angham, and Kuwaiti singer Abdallah Al Rowaished. The inaugural season on Dubai TV concluded in January 2024, with Haneen Elshater announced as the winner.

The second season premiered on November 3, 2024. The grand finale took place on January 12, 2025. The show was produced by Mformedia in partnership with the Dubai Department of Economy and Tourism as part of the "DSF Nights" events. The panel featued two new judges - Rahma Riad and Fayez Al Saeed, along with returning judge Ragheb Alama. The title was won by Abdul Rahim Al-Halabi, a Syrian contestant who first gained fame as a child on The Voice Kids.

== Series Overview ==
- Act in Nelly's Category
- Act in Khaled's Category
- Act in Michel's Category
- Act in Anoushka's Category
- Act in Elissa's Category
- Act in Carole's Category
- Act in Wael's Category
- Act in Hussain's Category
- Act in Ragheb's Category
- Act in Donia's Category
- Act in Angham's Category
- Act in Abdallah's Category
- Act in Rahma's Category
- Act in Fayez's Category

Season	Start	Finish	Winner	Other Finalists		Winning mentor	Host	Judges (seating order)			
1	6 February 2006	15 May 2006	Raja Kessabny; Over 25s	Ahmad Alaa; 16-24s	Guitarista (Ali, Rami Faraj, Marwan); Groups	Nelly	Nathalie Maamary; Charbel Raji (Xtra Factor)	Michel	Nelly	Khaled	—N/a
2	29 May 2007	1 August 2007	Muhammad El Majzoub; 16-24s	Bouchra Al Sahafi; Over 25s	Osama Betro; Over 25s	Anoushka	Joelle Rahme	Michel	Anoushka	Khaled	—N/a
3	21 February 2013	24 May 2013	Mohammed Rifi; Over 25s	Ibrahim Abdel Adim; Over 25s	Adham Nabulsi; Boys	Hussain Al Jasmi	Yosra El Lozy; Bassel Alzaro	Carole	Wael	Elissa	Hussain
4	14 March 2015	13 June 2015	Hamza Hawsawi; Solo International	Hind Ziad; Solo Arab	The 5 Groups	Ragheb Alama	Bassel Alzaro; Wael Mansour (Xtra Factor); Daniella Rahme	Donia	Elissa	Ragheb	—N/a
5	3 September 2023	January 2024	Haneen Elshater; 16-24s	Shaimaa Omran; Over 25s	Nasser & Hamdan Mohammed; Groups	Ragheb Alama	Sheema	Abdallah	Angham	Ragheb	—N/a
6	3 November 2024	12 January 2025	Abdul Rahim Al-Halabi	Hashem Al-Raquad	Majid Khalid	Rahma Riad	Sheema	Fayez	Rahma	Ragheb	—N/a

== Summary ==
In each series, each judge is allocated a category to mentor and chooses three acts to progress to the live finals. This table shows, for each series, which category each judge was allocated and which acts he or she put through to the live finals.

Key:

– Winning judge/category. Winners are in bold, eliminated contestants in small font.

Season	Year	Nelly	Khaled El Sheikh	Michel Elefteriades	
**One**	6 Feb - 15 May 2006	**Over 25s** Maher Abdallah Ghazal; **Raja Kessabny**; Sherine	**16-24s** Ahmad Alaa; Dora El Forti; Hala Al Sabbagh	**Groups**; Guitarista; Play; Prova	
Season	Year	Anoushka	Khaled El Sheikh	Michel Elefteriades	
**Two**	29 May - 1 August 2007	**16-24s** Chamiyya Abdalaziz; Hala; Mahmoud; **Muhammad El Majzoub**	**Over 25s** Bouchra El Sahafi; Ikram El Assi; Nisrine; Ousama Betro	**Groups**; Nhas; Safaa & Hanaa; Trio; Twins	
Season	Year	Elissa	Carole Samaha	Wael Kfoury	Hussain Al Jasmi
**Three**	21 Feb - 24 May 2013	**Girls**; Imane Karkibou; Salwa Anlouf; Soumaya Turki	**Groups**; Young Pharoz; Maraya Band; Les Bledards Ninja	**Boys**; Adham Nabulsi; Al Muntasser Billah; Houssam Terchichi; Ali Hamed	**Over 25s** **Mohammed Rifi**; Ibrahim Abdel Adim; Marwa Ahmed
Season	Year	Ragheb Alama	Elissa	Donia Samir Ghanem	
**Four**	14 March - 13 June 2015	**Solo International**; Hamza Hawsawi; Latoya; Nedjim Mahtallah; Maria Nadim	**Solo Arabic**; Hind Ziadi; Majdi Sharif; Rania Jdidi; Nada Khalil	**Groups**; The5; GuitaNai; Mounib Band; Aves Band	

== Season 1 (2006) ==
=== Results summary ===
Colour key

Act in team Nelly

Act in team Khaled

Act in team Michel

–	Act was in the bottom two and had to sing again in the final showdown
–	Act received the fewest public votes and was immediately eliminated (no final showdown)
–	Act received the most public votes

Weekly results per act
Act	Week 1	Week 2	Week 3	Week 4	Week 5	Quarter-Final	Semi-Final	Final	
Raja Kessabny	Safe	Safe	Bottom Two	Safe	Safe	Safe	Safe	Winner	
Ahmed Alaa	Safe	Safe	Safe	Bottom Two	Bottom Two	Bottom Two	Safe	Runner-up	
Guitarista	Safe	Safe	Safe	Safe	Safe	Safe	3rd	Eliminated (semi-final)	
Dora El Forti	Bottom Two	Safe	Safe	Safe	Safe	Bottom Two	Eliminated (quarter-final)		
Maher Abdallah Ghazal	Safe	Safe	Safe	Safe	Bottom Two	Eliminated (week 5)			
Play	Safe	Safe	Safe	Bottom Two	Eliminated (week 4)				
Hala Al Sabbagh	Safe	Bottom Two	Bottom Two	Eliminated (week 3)					
Prova	Safe	Bottom Two	Eliminated (week 2)						
Sherine	Bottom Two	Eliminated (week 1)							
Final Showdown	Raja Kessabny	Ahmed Alaa	Dora El Forti	Maher	Play	Hala Al Sabbagh	Prova	Sherine	No final showdown or judges' votes; results were based on public votes alone
Michel's vote to eliminate (Groups)	Sherine		Hala Al Sabbagh		Maher	Dora El Forti			No final showdown or judges' votes; results were based on public votes alone
Khaled's vote to eliminate (16-24s)	Sherine	Prova		Play	Maher				No final showdown or judges' votes; results were based on public votes alone
Nelly's vote to eliminate (Over 25s)		Prova	Hala Al Sabbagh	Play		Dora El Forti			No final showdown or judges' votes; results were based on public votes alone
Eliminated	Sherine; 2 of 3 votes Majority	Prova; 2 of 3 votes Majority	Hala Al Sabbagh; 2 of 3 votes Majority	Play; 2 of 3 votes Majority	Maher Abdallah Ghazal; 2 of 3 votes Majority	Dora El Forti; 2 of 3 votes Majority	Guitarista; Public vote to save	Ahmed Alaa; Public vote to win	

== Season 2 (2007) ==
=== Results summary ===
Colour key

Act in team Anoushka

Act in team Khaled

Act in team Michel

–	Act was in the bottom two and had to sing again in the final showdown
–	Act received the fewest public votes and was immediately eliminated (no final showdown)
–	Act received the most public votes

Weekly results per act
Act	Week 1	Week 2	Week 3	Week 4	Week 5	Week 6	Week 7	Week 8	Quarter-Final	Semi-Final	Final
Muhammad El Majzoub	Safe	Safe	Safe	Safe	Safe	Safe	Safe	Safe	Safe	Safe	Winner
Bouchra El Sahafi	Safe	Safe	Safe	Safe	Safe	Safe	Safe	Safe	Safe	Safe	Runner-up
Ousama Betro	Safe	Safe	Safe	Safe	Safe	Safe	Bottom Two	Bottom Two	Safe	3rd	Eliminated (Week 10)
Safaa And Hanaa	Safe	Bottom Two	Safe	Safe	Safe	Safe	Safe	Safe	4th	Eliminated (Week 9)	
Chamiyya Abdalaziz	Safe	Safe	Safe	Safe	Safe	Bottom Two	Safe	Bottom Two	Eliminated (Week 8)		
Nhas	Safe	Safe	Safe	Safe	Safe	Safe	Bottom Two	Eliminated (Week 7)			
Twins	Safe	Safe	Safe	Safe	Bottom Two	Bottom Two	Eliminated (Week 6)				
Trio	Safe	Safe	Safe	Bottom Two	Bottom Two	Eliminated (Week 5)					
Nisrine	Safe	Safe	Safe	Bottom Two	Eliminated (Week 4)						
Mahmoud	Safe	Safe	10th	Eliminated (Week 3)							
Hala	Safe	Bottom Two	Eliminated (Week 2)								
Ikram El Remas	Safe	12th	Eliminated (Week 2)								
Final Showdown	Ousama Betro	Safaa And Hanaa	Chamiyya Abdalaziz	Nhas	Twins	Trio	Nisrine	Hala	No final showdown or judges' votes; results were based on public votes alone		
Anoushka's vote to eliminate (16-24s)	Ikram El Remas		Nisrine	Trio	Twins	Nhas			No final showdown or judges' votes; results were based on public votes alone		
Khaled's vote to eliminate (Over 25s)	Hala	Mahmoud		Trio	Twins	Nhas	Chamiyya Abdalaziz		No final showdown or judges' votes; results were based on public votes alone		
Michel's vote to eliminate (Groups)	Hala |Ikram El Remas	Mahmoud	Nisrine				Chamiyya Abdalaziz		No final showdown or judges' votes; results were based on public votes alone		
Eliminated	Hala; 2 of 3 votes Majority	Ikram El Remas; 2 of 3 votes Majority	Mahmoud; 2 of 3 votes Majority	Nisrine; 2 of 3 votes Majority	Trio; 2 of 3 votes Majority	Twins; 2 of 3 votes Majority	Nhas; 2 of 3 votes Majority	Chamiyya Abdalaziz; 2 of 3 votes Majority	Safaa And Hanaa; Public vote to save	Ousama Betro; Public vote to save	Bouchra El Sahafi; Public vote to win

== Season 3 (2013) ==
Colour key

–	Contestant was in the bottom two and had to sing again in the final showdown
–	Contestant received the fewest public votes and was immediately eliminated (no final showdown)
–	Contestant received the most public votes

Weekly results per contestant
Contestant	Week 1	Week 2	Week 3	Week 4	Week 5	Week 6	Week 7	Week 8	Week 9	Week 10	
Contestant	Week 1	Week 2	Week 3	Week 4	Week 5	Week 6	Week 7	Week 8	Week 9	Round 1	Round 2
Mohammed Rifi	1st 24.66%	1st 23.42%	1st 25.44%	1st 33.08%	1st 32.03%	1st 33.50%	1st 31.18%	1st 35.11%	1st 46.16%	1st 61.16%	Winner
Ibrahim Abdel Adim	12th 1.36%	2nd 13.69%	6th 7.60%	7th 4.64%	5th 8.40%	4th 9.12%	3rd 15.22%	3rd 17.24%	2nd 19.62%	2nd 20.92%	Runner-Up
Adham Nabulsi	3rd 15.17%	5th 12.15%	3rd 14.64%	2nd 15.36%	2nd 21.12%	2nd 17.55%	2nd 18.34%	4th 15.12%	3rd 19.47%	3rd 17.39%	Eliminated
Young Pharoz	2nd 18.32%	6th 10.55%	5th 9.54%	4th 9.53%	4th 8.85%	3rd 13.12%	5th 13.46%	2nd 22.79%	4th 14.75%	Eliminated (week 9)	
Imane Karkibou	5th 10.30%	3rd 13.63%	2nd 15.39%	5th 8.92%	7th 7.55%	7th 8.65%	4th 13.57%	5th 9.74%	Eliminated (week 8)		
Salwa Anlouf	4th 13.17%	4th 12.52%	4th 11.06%	3rd 10.60%	3rd 10.00%	5th 9.05%	6th 8.23%	Eliminated (week 7)			
Marwa Ahmed	8th 2.41%	7th 3.60%	7th 4.05%	6th 6.58%	6th 8.33%	6th 9.02%	Eliminated (week 6)				
Maraya	7th 3.67%	9th 2.44%	9th 3.37%	8th 3.99%	8th 3.72%	Eliminated (week 5)					
Al Muntasser Billah	11th 1.45%	10th 2.08%	10th 2.78%	9th 3.98%	Eliminated (week 4)						
Houssam Terchichi	6th 5.24%	8th 2.86%	8th 3.81%	10th 3.31%	Eliminated (week 4)						
Les Bledards Ninja	10th 1.56%	11th 1.72%	11th 2.32%	Eliminated (week 3)							
Ali Hamed	9th 1.71%	12th 1.35%	Eliminated (week 2)								
Soumaya Turki	13th 0.99%	Eliminated (week 1)									
Final showdown	Soumaya Turki, Ibrahim Abdel Adim	Ali Hamed, Les Bledards Ninja	Les Bledards Ninja, Al Mountassir Billah	Al Mountassir Billah, Maraya	Maraya, Imane Karkibou	Imane Karkibou, Marwa Ahmed	Salwa Anlouf, Young Pharoz	Imane Karkibou, Adham Nabulsi	No final showdown or judges' votes; results were based on public votes alone		
Samaha's vote to eliminate	Ibrahim Abdel Adim	Les Bledards Ninja	Les Bledards Ninja	Maraya	Maraya	Imane Karkibou	Young Pharoz	Adham Nabulsi	No final showdown or judges' votes; results were based on public votes alone		
Kfoury's vote to eliminate	Ibrahim Abdel Adim	Ali Hamed	Al Mountassir Billah	Al Mountassir Billah	Imane Karkibou	Imane Karkibou	Young Pharoz	Adham Nabulsi	No final showdown or judges' votes; results were based on public votes alone		
Elissa's vote to eliminate	Soumaya Turki	Les Bledards Ninja	Al Mountassir Billah	Al Mountassir Billah	Imane Karkibou	Imane Karkibou	Salwa Anlouf	Imane Karkibou	No final showdown or judges' votes; results were based on public votes alone		
Al Jasmi's vote to eliminate	Ibrahim Abdel Adim	Les Bledards Ninja	Al Mountassir Billah	Maraya	Imane Karkibou	Marwa Ahmed	Young Pharoz	Adham Nabulsi	No final showdown or judges' votes; results were based on public votes alone		
