= Hoda Saad =

Moroccan actress and singer-songwriter (born 1981)

Houda Saad
- هدى سعد
- Born: 22 November 1981 (age 44); Casablanca, Morocco
- Occupations: Singer, songwriter, musician, writer, actress
- Years active: 2008–present
- Musical career
- Genre: Arabic

Hoda Saad (Arabic: هدى سعد; born 22 November 1981) is a Moroccan singer-songwriter and actress. She was contracted to Rotana Records after appearing on The X Factor, XSeer Al Najah in 2006, releasing her first album in 2008, and her second in 2011.

== Early life ==
Saad took part in the Moroccan singing competition "Noujoum El Ghad", produced by the local channel 2M, in which she placed third. She studied at the Geneva University of Music in Geneva, Switzerland, where she learned the basics of Western music.

== Career ==
In 2006, she took part in the Arabic version of The X-Factor, produced by Rotana, which also discovered fellow Moroccan Rajaa Kasabni, who eventually won. Hoda got eliminated quickly by Egyptian singer and judge Nelly Artin Kalfayan, but her voice got the attention of Rotana's CEO, Salim El Hindi, who invited her to join the label. She released her first album, "Ertaht" in 2008, which features songs in various dialects, from her native Moroccan dialect to Lebanese, Egyptian, and Gulf. Three singles were released from the album and turned into video clips: two Egyptian songs, "Ma Saddaq" and "Ma Kountesh", and the Moroccan song "Ma Tfakarnish," which she wrote and composed herself.

She sang a duet with Iraqi singer Majid El Muhandes titled "Ala Bali" and released another successful single in Moroccan dialect, "Bghito Walla Krehto," which she also wrote and composed. The clip was shot in Turkey by a French video director. The single was later included in her second album titled "Tayr El Hob", released in 2011 and produced by Rotana. This album is a premiere in the Middle East as being the first album entirely performed in the Moroccan dialect. Hoda wrote and composed all the songs and recorded them in various studios in the United Kingdom, Lebanon, and Egypt. A second single from the album was released as a video clip, the main single "Tayr El Hob" in January 2012. Hoda Saad wrote songs for other Moroccan singers such as Asmaa Lamnawar, Tahra Hamamish, or Leila Gouchi, and even wrote and composed a song for the great Syrian singer Assala Nasri's upcoming album.

=== Albums ===
- Ertaht (2009), produced by Rotana
1. "Ma Kontesh" – (Egyptian Arabic)
2. "Ma Saddaq" – (Egyptian Arabic)
3. "Maghroumi Feek" – (Lebanese Arabic)
4. "Abu El Aarif" – (Egyptian Arabic)
5. "Jeet Nsaydo wa Sayadni" – (Moroccan Arabic)
6. "Ma Tfakarnish" – (Moroccan Arabic)
7. "Ma Baddak" – (Lebanese Arabic)
8. "Ertaht" – (Egyptian Arabic)
9. "Allah Yestar" – (Gulf Arabic)
10. "Tameni Aleik" – (Egyptian Arabic)
- Tayr El Hob (2011), produced by Rotana
1. "Tayr El Hob" – (Moroccan Arabic)
2. "El Nass" – (Moroccan Arabic)
3. "Mohima Rasmiya" – (Moroccan Arabic)
4. "El Ashra" – (Moroccan Arabic)
5. "Shafok M'aha" -(Moroccan Arabic)
6. "Nari" – (Moroccan Arabic)
7. "Leili Nahari" – (Moroccan Arabic)
8. "Bghito Walla Krehto" – (Moroccan Arabic)
9. "Nhawel Ensa" – (Moroccan Arabic)
10. "Mazal Nebghik" – (Moroccan Arabic)
11. "Mreeda" – (Moroccan Arabic)

=== Video clips ===
- "Ma Saddaq" (2008) directed by Fadi Haddad
- "Ma Tfakarnish" (2009) directed by Waleed Nassif
- "Ma Kountesh" (2009) directed by Waleed Nassif
- "Bghito Walla Krehto" (2010) directed by Fabien Dufils
- "Tayr El Hob" (2012) directed by Randa Alam
