= Hiba Tawaji =

Lebanese singer and actress (born 1987)

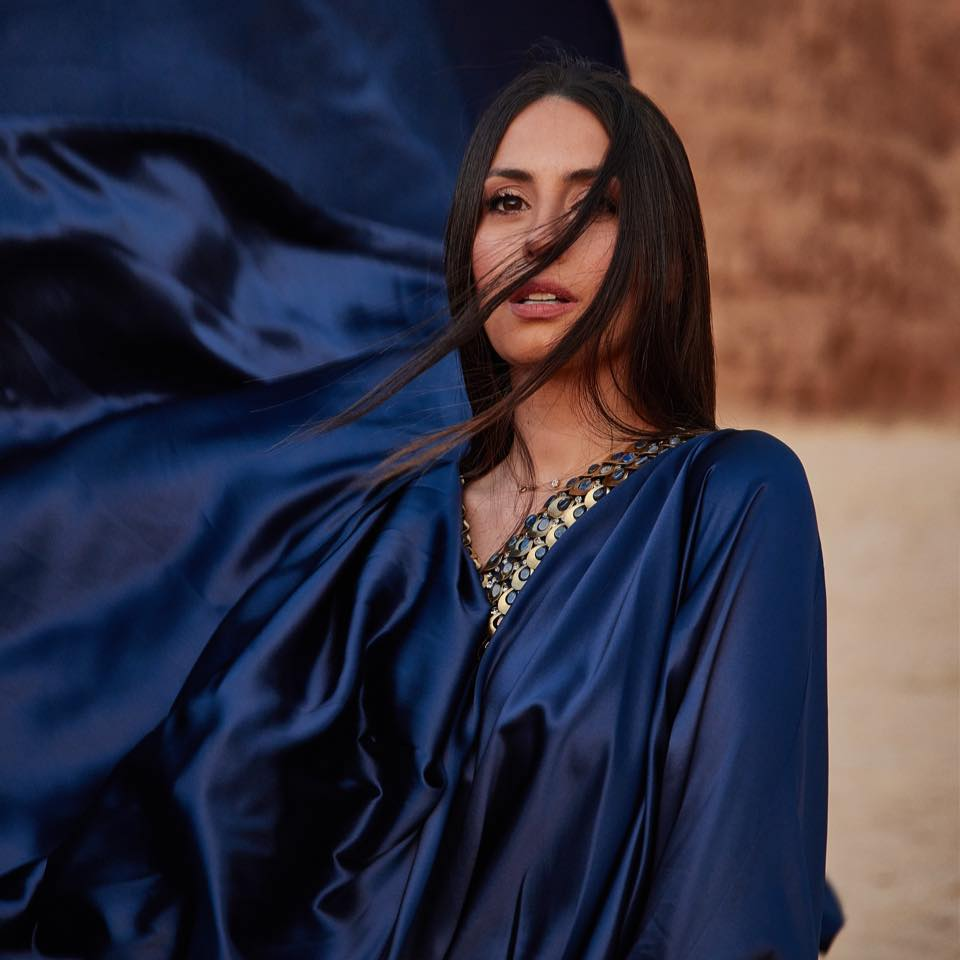
- Hiba at AL ULA 2021

Background information
- Born: Hiba Michel Tawaji; 10 December 1987 (age 38); Achrafieh, Beirut, Lebanon
- Origin: Lebanese
- Genres: Arabic music, jazz, opera, funk, pop music
- Occupations: Singer, actress, director
- Years active: 2008–present
- Spouse: Ibrahim Maalouf

Hiba Michel Tawaji (Arabic: هبة ميشال طوجي; born 10 December 1987) is a Lebanese singer, actress, and director. Since 2008, she has been active in the Lebanese and Arab music scene. She has a 4-octave vocal range.

She started her career playing the main female role in Rahbani musicals. She also participated in the fourth season of France's version of The Voice, in which she was coached by Mika and reached the semi-finals. After The Voice, she signed with Mercury Records in 2015. She joined the cast of Notre-Dame de Paris as Esmeralda in the revival of the musical. She has since toured with the cast and performed internationally. Tawaji has also pursued her Arabic career with four studio albums produced by Oussama Rahbani.

== Early life and education ==
Hiba Michel Tawaji was born on 10 December 1987 in Achrafieh, Beirut to Lebanese Orthodox parents Michel and Adele. She grew up in Elissar, a neighborhood of Mazraat Yachouh in the Matn District. She trained at an early age in opera and classical singing, then in modern style. From 1990 until 2005, Tawaji studied at the Athenee de Beyrouth School and received a literary baccalaureate.

From 2002 until 2007, she took singing lessons and solfeggio at Ecole des Arts Ghassan Yammine. She then went to Saint Joseph University of Beirut, IESAV, and majored in audio-visual and cinematographic studies, earning her B.A. in 2010. Tawaji also trained in directing and acting. She obtained her bachelor's degree in 2012 with a short movie she wrote and directed.

== Career ==
=== 2008–2014: Early career and musical debut ===
Singing in French, English, and Arabic, Tawaji was noticed by producers and composers in the Middle East. Interested in the work of the Rahbani family, Tawaji contacted Oussama Rahbani, who became her producer after her audition. Tawaji has said on several occasions that her collaboration with Rahbani is lifelong and that no contract exists to govern their projects together.

Singing in French, English, and Arabic, Tawaji was noticed by producers and composers in the Middle East. Interested in the work of the Rahbani family, Tawaji contacted Oussama Rahbani, who became her producer after her audition. Tawaji has said on several occasions that her collaboration with Rahbani is lifelong and that no contract exists to govern their projects together.

In 2008, Tawaji released her first single, "Metl El Rih" (Like the Wind), which received airtime on TV channels across Lebanon. Her second single, "Helm" (Dream), followed, and she directed its music video herself. Both songs were a product of her collaboration with the Rahbani family. Tawaji made her stage debut in 2008 as the protagonist in the musical The Return of the Phoenix by Mansour and Oussama Rahbani, which played in Byblos and Dubai, alongside Ghassan Saliba, Antoine Kerbage, and Takla Chamoun. The following year, she again played the main role in the musical Sayf 840 alongside Saliba.

Between May and July 2010, she took vocal lessons with Emmy Award winner Gwen Conley in New York. In that same period, she attended a three-month intensive acting workshop at the Stella Adler Studio of Acting in New York. She returned to Lebanon and appeared in other musicals by the Rahbanis, Don Quixote and Moulouk Al Tawaef.

In 2012, Tawaji released her first album La Bidayi Wala Nihayi, in collaboration with Oussama Rahbani. The eponymous single is an Arabic version of "The Windmills of Your Mind" (Les Moulins de mon Coeur) written by Michel Legrand and received considerable airplay in Lebanon and the Arab world. The record also contained the songs "Zat Ellafti", with pop influences, and "La Tkelli Ennak Meshtakli." Tawaji's second album, Ya Habibi, was released in 2014 with the singles "Khalas" and "Awwal Ma Cheftou", and was positively received. The record also comprises Tawaji's version of the song "Helwa ya baladi", first performed by Dalida.

Tawaji also performed with the National Symphonic Orchestra of Ukraine in 2013 and 2014, headlining shows in Lebanon, Oman and the United Arab Emirates. In 2014, she released the official tribute song to the Lebanese Army on its 69th anniversary, Metl El Chajar Mazrouiin.

=== 2015–2017: Appearance on The Voice and career in France ===
In January 2015, Tawaji took part in the fourth season of The Voice: la plus belle voix, France's version of The Voice. In the blind auditions, she auditioned with a bilingual version of "La Bidayi Wala Nihayi", leading all four judges to turn their chairs. Tawaji opted to be in Team Mika. The blind audition was broadcast on day 3 of the auditions on 24 January 2015.

In the Battles Round, Tawaji faced Nög, another contestant in Mika's team, singing "Mon amie la rose" by Françoise Hardy. Mika elected to proceed to the next round with Tawaji, while Nög was stolen by fellow coach Zazie. During the "L'Épreuve ultime" round, she performed "Fighter" by Christina Aguilera, ending up in the Top 4 of Team Mika. In the live rounds, she sang "Everytime" by Britney Spears and was saved by public vote as a top pick from Team Mika. In the second live round, she sang "Amoureuse" by Véronique Sanson again receiving the highest number of public votes in Team Mika. Mika also opted to keep David Thibault as Top 2 in his team.

In the semi-finals held on 18 April, she faced David Thibault in a contest to represent Team Mika in the final. She sang "Pas là" by Vianney, but lost to Thibault in the public vote, with the latter qualifying to the final. Tawaji finished joint 5th to 8th place for the season.

Following her appearance on the show, Tawaji was signed to Mercury Records in 2015 and released her first single in French, "Comme un symbole", which she performed on The Voice as a musical guest on the eleventh episode of the fifth season. Her vocal abilities and experience on stage attracted the attention of the producers of Notre-Dame de Paris, Riccardo Cocciante, and Luc Plamondon, who offered her the role to reprise the role of Esmeralda, previously played by Hélène Ségara in the musical for its first official revival, which opened at the Palais des Congrès in Paris in November 2016.

In 2015, Tawaji collaborated with Disney and sang "Nuits d'Arabie" from Aladdin on the French album We Love Disney compilation best of.

=== 2017–2022: Hiba Tawaji 30, television and other projects ===
In 2017, Tawaji announced a new project with Oussama Rahbani, titled Hiba Tawaji 30, to mark her 30th birthday. The album's release was preceded by Tawaji's release of the patriotic song "Bghannilak Ya Watani", whose music video, directed by Tawaji, depicts a better vision of Lebanon in the future. Hiba Tawaji 30 consists of 30 songs on two CDs. The first CD contains 15 original songs, most of them written by Ghadi Rahbani with five songs written by Oussama Rahbani. The second disc is a compilation of Tawaji's previous works as well as covers of Umm Kulthum and Sayed Darwish. The last song on the album was produced by Disney for the animated series Elena of Avalor, for which she dubbed the singing role of main character Princess Elena in Arabic. The album was released on 30 March 2017.

Tawaji and Oussama Rahbani marked ten years of collaboration with a live show called TEN, which was exclusively performed on stage as the closing act of the Cedars International Festival in Bsharri, Lebanon, on 5 August 2017. The production featured more than 120 dancers choreographed by Pascale Sayegh Zgheib and was performed with the Lebanese Orchestra conducted by Oussama Rahbani.

She was the singer of the official soundtrack for the series Tarik, which premiered during Ramadan in 2018. The Ramadan season is the annual peak of TV audiences. The song, also called "Tarik", reached broad audiences in the Arabic-speaking world and became Tawaji's most popular song.

In 2020, she made her television debut as an actress in the lead role in Arab series Hawas (Obsession) alongside Syrian actor Abed Fahed. She also performed the official soundtrack of the series Lahza Ya Rayt (If only one moment). In 2021, she released the song Aylan in memory of the three-year old migration victim Aylan Kurdi.

=== 2022–present: Universal Music Arabia and Baad Sneen ===
In 2022, Tawaji signed a record deal with Universal Music Arabia, a division of Republic Records and Universal Music Group. She is managed by Lebanese-Canadian executive Wassim "SAL" Slaiby, the CEO of the label, which he launched to promote Arabic music internationally. On 7 October 2022, Tawaji released her first single under UMA called "Que Será Será" (Law Nebka Sawa) featuring Puerto Rican singer Luis Fonsi.

She also performed a one-time concert, open to the public free of charge, called Night of Hope, in the first large musical event after the 2020 Beirut explosion. As part of the cultural revival efforts amid the political and economic crisis in Lebanon, the Rahbani-produced performance took place at the Forum de Beyrouth and was broadcast live on MTV Lebanon. Tawaji performed a duet with Elissa. She also headlined a concert in Dubai as a part of the festivities for the luxury brand Louis Vuitton's 200th anniversary.

In February 2023, Tawaji released Habibi Khalas, second single from her then-upcoming album. The track is written by long-time collaborator Oussama Rahbani and Adonis frontman Anthony Khoury and is accompanied by a music video shot in Paris. Tawaji released her studio album Baad Sneen in May 2023, her first one under her Universal deal. The record was published with the music video of the eponymous third single, in which Tawaji performs in the Egyptian dialect.

== Personal life ==
On 19 September 2020, she married the French-Lebanese musician Ibrahim Maalouf. In 2021, she gave birth to their son, Nael. In 2023, she announced on Instagram the birth of their second child, a daughter named Rita Aya.

== Musical style and influences ==
Tawaji has performed in genres including opera, Arabic pop, Western pop, jazz, blues, Tarab, Latin genres, and French variété, as well as religious hymns. She cites Dalida, Lara Fabian, Celine Dion, Whitney Houston, Léo Ferré, Daniel Lévi, Charles Aznavour and Michael Jackson as her influences since childhood, alongside her personal favorite Mariah Carey, but has said she has never limited her music preferences to one genre. In her concerts, she has also performed jazz, including "I Can Explain" by Rachelle Ferrell, using the whistle register.

Tawaji has shot behind-the-scenes documentaries of her projects and concerts, directed by Nader Mousally and released on YouTube.

== Discography ==
=== Albums ===
- 2009: Sayf 840 (صيف 840), produced by Oussama Rahbani
- 2011: Don Quixote, produced by Oussama Rahbani
- 2012: La Bidayi Wala Nihayi (لا بداية ولا نهاية), produced by Oussama Rahbani
- 2014: Ya Habibi (يا حبيبي), produced by Oussama Rahbani
- 2016: Notre Dame de Paris (official soundtrack album)
- 2017: Hiba Tawaji 30, double album, produced by Oussama Rahbani
- 2017: Hallelujah, Christmas album produced by Oussama Rahbani
- 2019: Aladdin (official soundtrack album)
- 2023: Baad Sneen

== Filmography ==
=== As a director ===
- 2013: Al Habla (The Rope), starring Nazih Youssef (short movie)

=== As an actress ===
- 2020: Hawas (Obsession), starring Hiba Tawaji and Abed Fahed, directed by Mohamad Lotfy (TV series)

=== As a voice actress ===
- 2017: Elena of Avalor, the Arabic version of the Disney animated series, singing
- 2019: Aladdin, the French version of the Disney live-action movie, speaking and singing
- 2021: Les mystères de la chorale, French TV movie produced by France 3, singing

== Musical theater ==
- 2000–2008: The Return of the Phoenix (عودة الفينيق) by Oussama Rahbani, performed as part of the Byblos International Festival and in Dubai, then in residency at the Casino du Liban
- 2009–2010: Sayf 840 (صيف 840) by Mansour Rahbani and Oussama Rahbani, performed as part of the Byblos International Festival, then in residency at the Casino du Liban
- 2010–2019: Moulouk Al Tawaef (ملوك الطوائف) by Oussama Rahbani, occasionally performed as part of multiple festivals in the Arab world (Qatar, Tunisia, Lebanon)
- 2011: Don Quixote by Marwan Rahbani, Ghadi Rahbani and Oussama Rahbani, performed as part of the Byblos International Festival
- 2016–2022: Notre-Dame de Paris by Riccardo Cocciante and Luc Plamondon, worldwide tour
