= Sleiman Damien =

Lebanese musician, producer, and DJ

- Origin: Beirut, Lebanon
- Genres: Arabic pop; Techno
- Occupations: Producer; Arranger; Mixer
- Years active: 2014–present
- Labels: Universal Music MENA; Sony Music; MBC Group; Fantôme de Nuit Records
- Member of: Three Machines
- Website: Official website

Sleiman Damien (Arabic: سليمان دميان) is a Lebanese musician, music producer, and DJ specializing in modern Arab pop fusion. Many of his musical production collaborations topped Lebanese and regional Arab charts.

== Early life and education ==
Damien attended the Collège des Sœurs des Saints Cœurs in Kfarhbab-Ghazir. During his early career, he set up a small recording studio at home, and experimented with various musical genres.

== Work ==
Damien rose to prominence in 2014 through his collaboration with Lebanese singer Carole Samaha. The hit song “Sahranin” showcased Sleiman's music arrangement style that combines Arabic pop music with upbeat EDM.

In 2015, Damien associated with Lebanese Techno artist and producer Tarek Majdalani; they started the deep house duo "Three Machines". Damien and Majdalani formed a long term working relationship, collaborating on several high-profile projects for veteran mainstream Arab music stars. In 2016 Lebanese singer Assi El Hellani met Damien and Majdalani, he was impressed with their work, and they landed their first music production collaboration. Their first collaboration, "Aheb El Leil", topped the Lebanese music charts. Damien and Majdalani also arranged songs for both Al-Waleed and Maritta Hellani. During a 2017 television interview, Majdalani who comes from a Techno music background, attributed his introduction to Arabic Pop music production to Damien.

In April 2016, Damien was a founding member, together with renowned Lebanese pianist Michel Fadel, of Quartet Music, an event management and entertainment collaborative that highlights young musical talent. Fadel and Damien collaborated again, together with long-term partner Tarek Majdalani, on light and music spectacle for the Jounieh International Festival complete with a philharmonic orchestra.

Damien works both with startup artists and well-established Arab stars, including George Wassouf, Walid Toufic, Haifa Wehbe, and Ragheb Alama. He recognized the musical talent of Lebanese young artist Zef, whom he spotted when the latter busked in the streets of Byblos in the early 2010s. In 2019, 7 years after their initial meeting, Damien produced all of Zef's mellow alternative pop tracks. Damien also regularly produces full albums and tracks for indie bands and international artists such as Anthony Touma, and Adonis who describe him as a fifth band member.

Damien, and songwriter and composer Nabil Khoury approached Abeer Nehme with a song through Universal Music MENA. The resulting collaboration, "Bala Ma Nhess", was an instant success, garnering millions of YouTube views shortly after its release in March 2022. "Bala Ma Nhess" which was Damien and Nehme's first collaboration, topped the Lebanese music charts. Nehme announced future collaboration with Damien, and in an An-Nahar interview, credited his mixing and production skills as key factors in the song's success. Damien and Nassif Zeytoun’2 2022 "Bel Ahlam" was another instant hit, topping the regional charts days after its release.

== Style ==
Damien's Arab fusion music features elements from various music styles, including rock and EDM. Unlike traditional Arab music production which prioritizes lyrics, Damien focused on integrating arrangement and music production at the starting phase of each project. He believes that more independent artists will have a wider reach with the current trend of music consumption democratization. He also believes that eclecticism in his musical collaborations will make various styles palatable to a more diverse range of audiences, bridging the gap between established artists and the Arab indie scene. In a 2023 interview, he cited Zef & Stephanie Atala’s "El Bekle" as an example of new independent talent that broke into the Middle Eastern music charts and competed with conventional records from industry heavyweights. He also stated that his goal is to help niche songs crossover to the mainstream, and Arabic music to reach the global audience by collaborating with more regional and international artists.

== Personal life ==
Damien is open about his struggles with anxiety, which he believes is a common issue among industry professionals and musicians in the Arab region.

== Selected works ==
Artist	Single / Album	Label	Role	Year
Abeer Nehme	"Bala Ma Nhess"	Universal Music MENA	Producer, mixer	2022
Adonis	"12 Saa (Full album)"	Independent	Producer, mixer	2019
Adonis	"Thoqb Aswad"	Independent	Producer, mixer	2020
Adonis	"Aadaa (Full album)"	Independent	Producer, mixer	2021
Almena	GTA	Universal Music MENA	Producer (with Tarek Majdalani)	2019
Anthony Touma	Ups and Downs (Full Album)	Universal Music MENA	Producer (with Tarek Majdalani), Mixer	2018
Anthony Touma	"A Nous" ft. Lea Makhoul	Universal Music MENA	Vocal mixer	2020
Al Walid El Hellani	"Amyes'alou"	AMD Production	Producer, mixer	2019
Al Walid El Hellani	"Mesh Wadeh"	AMD Production	Producer, mixer	2022
Assi El Hallani	"Aheb El Leil"	LifeStylez Studios	Producer (with Tarek Majdalani)	2016
Assi El Hallani	"Habib el Alb" "Kint el ward" "Wa3ed Albi"	Rotana Music	Producer (with Tarek Majdalani)	2017
Assi El Hallani	"Hob Jnoun"	Rotana Music	Producer (with Tarek Majdalani), mixer	2018
Assi El Hallani	"Shu Bkhaf Aleiky"	Rotana Music	Producer (with Tarek Majdalani), mixer	2019
Assi El Hallani	"Edhaki"	Rotana Music	Producer (with Tarek Majdalani), mixer	2019
Assi El Hallani	"Maghroum Eh Maghroum" "Khalas Byekfi"	Rotana Music	Producer, mixer	2021
Aziz Maraka and Adonis band	"Nater"	Independent	Producer, mixer	2019
Aziza	"Salat ez-Zein"	Star System	Producer	2017
Aziza	Mn Hadid	Independent	Executive producer, mixer	2021
Aziza	Marra Kaman	Digital Sound	Mixer	2022
Carmen Soliman	"Habibi Mosh Habibi" Remix	Platinum Records FZLLC.	Producer (with Tarek Majdalani)	2014
Carole Samaha	"Sahranine"	Independent	Producer	2014
Cyrine Abdelnour	"Leila"	Anghami	Mixer	2020
Dana Hourani	"Ella Enta"	Independent	Producer, mixer	2019
Dana Hourani	"Zuruni"	Independent	Mixer	2019
Dana Hourani	"Lahza"	Independent	Producer, mixer	2019
Dana Hourani	Enti Ana	Independent	Producer, mixer	2020
Dana Hourani	"Erjaa Shoufak"	Independent	Producer, mixer	2021
Dana Hourani	"Yay"	Independent	Producer, mixer	2021
Dana Hourani	"Bla'i Hali"	Independent	Producer, mixer	2022
George Wassouf	"Sahi el Leil"	Anghami	Producer	2020
Ghenwa Nemnom	"Canon concert live from Niha"	Cafe de Anatolia	Producer, mixer	2021
Haifa Wehbe	"Jann El Sabi"	CHBK	Producer (with Tarek Majdalani), mixer	2018
Hoss	Etsha2leb	Anghami	Mixer	2018
Jad Shwery	"Mesh Ay Kalam"	Wittycan	Producer, mixer	2019
Jad Shwery and Hala el Turk	"Layali El Sayf"	Platinum Records FZLLC.	Producer, mixer	2021
Joe Ashkar	"Masari Min Wein"	Watary	Producer, mixer	2019
Joe Ashkar	"Bde'ello"	Anghami	Mixer (with Tarek Majdalani)	2019
Joe Ashkar	"Albi Daala"	Independent	Producer, mixer	2022
K.A.R.L.	WavesOneMars (Full Album)	Burkan Records	Executive producer, mixer	2021
Kazem Chamas	"Halala"	Watary	Producer, mixer	2021
Lola Jaffan	"Fi Kel Helou Lolah"	Wittycan	Producer, mixer	2019
Lola Jaffan	"Law Amet El Iyama"	Wittycan	Producer, mixer	2020
Manel Mallat	"Baddna Nbih"	Watary	Producer (with Tarek Majdalani), mixer	2020
Maritta Hallani	"Shtaatellak"	Rotana Music	Producer (with Tarek Majdalani)	2017
Maritta Hallani	"Akher Marra" "Ana" "Eli W Melki" "Manno Maa'ad" "Nasini" "Tla'ayna"	AMD Production	Producer (with Tarek Majdalani), mixer	2018
Maritta Hallani	"Walaw"	AMD Production	Producer, mixer	2022
Nabil Khoury	"Kifak"	Independent	Producer, mixer	2019
Nabil Khoury	"Abel B Waet"	Independent	Producer, mixer	2020
Nassif Zeytoun	"Bel Ahlam”	Watary	Producer, mixer	2022
Rabih Gemayel	"Faw' el Adi"	Two Media Group	Producer (with Tarek Majdalani), mixer	2017
Ragheb Alama	Anghami Session	Anghami, Backstage Production	Producer, mixer	2019
Raja Otaqui	"Mafi Aman"	Quartertone	Producer, mixer	2022
Reem El Sharif	"Ana Fi Intizarak"	Anghami	Producer, mixer	2021
Ré Mi Bandali	"Trekni ehki"	Independent	Mixer	2019
Rima Yussef	"Ana Min"	Universal Music MENA	Producer, mixer	2021
Rima Yussef	"Ehsasi Fik"	Universal Music MENA	Mixer	2021
Rima Yussef	"Hekyo"	Universal Music MENA	Producer, mixer	2021
Rima Yussef	"Marrat"	Universal Music MENA	Producer, mixer	2021
Rima Yussef	"Ma tiida"	Universal Music MENA	Producer, mixer	2021
Rizan Said	Saz û Dilan	Akuphone	Producer, mixer	2019
The5	El Donia Shabab	Sony Music	Producer (with Tarek Majdalani & Michel Fadel)	2015
The5	Hanini	Sony Music	Producer (with Tarek Majdalani & Michel Fadel)	2015
Walid Toufic ft. Jad Shwery	"Dr. Fel Hob"	Walid Toufic	Producer, mixer	2022
Wissam El Amir	"Dommini"	Independent	Producer, mixer	2018
Yazan Kamel	"Ma Tfell"	Wittycan	Mixer	2022
Yazan Kamel	"Walhan"	Wittycan	Producer, mixer	2021
Zef	"Shi Nhar"	Independent	Producer, mixer	2019
Zef	"Sofon el Bahara"	Independent	Producer, mixer	2020
Zef	"Leish Baddi Eb'a" "Shem Wroud"	Watary	Producer, mixer	2021
