= Hdoudi Sama =

Studio album by Carole Samaha
- Released: December 2009
- Genre: Arabic pop
- Length: 49:30
- Language: Arabic
- Label: Melody Music
- Producer: Lacarma

Carole Samaha chronology
Adwa' Al Shohra (2006)	Hdoudi Sama (2009)

Hdoudi Sama (Arabic: حدودي السما, lit. "The sky is my limit") is a studio album by Carole Samaha. It was released in December 2009 and features 13 songs. Included is Carole's solo song from the soundtrack of the Pepsi musical Sea of Stars (Bahr El Nujoum) "Jeet" (here renamed "Majnouni (Jeet)").

In June 2010 Carole Samaha received the Best Album Murex d'Or award for this album and in 2011 the music video for the song Khallik Bhalak won the Murex d'Or award for best music video.

== Music videos ==
Several music videos with songs featured in this album have been released:

#	Song	Director	Release date	Notes
1	"Yama Layali"	Thierry Vergnes	March 23, 2008	
2	"Jeet (Majnouni)"	Amin Dora	July 13, 2008	from the movie Sea of Stars (Bahr El NuJoum)
3	"Ali"	Salim el Turk	November 23, 2008	
4	"Ragaalak"	Thierry Vergnes	July 5, 2009	filmed in the Maldives
5	"Zabehny"	Karim Ayari	August 16, 2009	filmed in Tunisia
6	"Ma Bkhaf"	Karim Ayari	November 8, 2009	
7	"A'oul Anssak"	Thierry Vergnes	March, 14. 2010	filmed in the Maldives
8	"Khallik Bhalak"	Thierry Vergnes	October 24. 2010	

== Track listing ==
#	Title	Translation	Length	Lyricist	Composer	Arranger	Dialect
1	"Ragaalak"	Coming back to you	4:06	Tamer Hussein	Amr Mustafa	Rocket	Egyptian
2	"Hdoudi Sama"	The sky is my limit	3:34	Marwan Khoury	Marwan Khoury	Michel Fadel	Lebanese
3	"Ma Bkhaf"	I am not scared	3:29	Salim Assaf	Salim Assaf	Michel Fadel	Lebanese
4	"Khallik Bhalak"	Stay away	4:00	Marwan Khoury	Marwan Khoury	Roger Khoury	Lebanese
5	"A'oul Anssak"	I try to forget you	3:35	Ramadan Mohammad	Mohammad Yehya	Michel Fadel	Egyptian
6	"Nadeyt"	I called	3:20	Khaled Tag Eddine	Amr Mustafa	Rocket	Egyptian
7	"Minn Allak"	Who told you?	3:19	Mounir Bou Assaf	Hisham Boulos	Dany Helou	Lebanese
8	"Awel Ma Abeltak"		4:48	Ayman Behgat Amar	Mohammad Yehya	Michel Fadel	Egyptian
9	"Aala Sawtak"	To your voice	3:16	Salim Assaf	Mohammad Yehya	Rocket	Lebanese
10	"Majnouni (Jeet)"	I must be crazy (You came)	3:52	Mounir Bou Assaf	Jean-Marie Riachi	Jean-Marie Riachi	Lebanese
11	"Ali"	Ali	3:33	Abet El Aziz Ammar & Salim Assaf	Mohammad Raheem, Raju, Hovannes K.	Hovannes K.	Egyptian
12	"Yama Layali"	How many nights	4:46	Mohammad Gomaa	Mohammad Raheem	Tameem, Hovannes K.	Egyptian
13	"Zabehni"	He "slaughtered" me	3:46	Abdallah Abu Rass	Nasser Al Saleh	Omar Abdel Aziz	Khaleeji
