= Young Pharoz =

Egyptian musical group

- Also known as: YP
- Origin: Cairo, Egypt
- Genres: Hip hop
- Years active: 2007–present
- Label: Sony Music
- Members: Mohamed Magdi; Ayman Seleha; Shahd El Shaarawy

Young Pharoz is an Egyptian hip hop trio consisting of Ayman Seleha, Mohamed Magdi (ill Magdi, formerly known as Mesho) and singer Shahd El Shaarawy, founded in 2007. The group's most notable appearance was in 2013 in season 3 of the Arabic X Factor, finishing in fourth place.

== History ==
Young Pharoz started in 2007 as an underground rap group with the inclusion of singer Shahd El Shaarawy in 2009. At that point, Young Pharoz consisted of four rappers (Mohamed Magdi, Ayman Seleha, Mohamed Hani and Hazem Alaa) and Shahd as singer; the group played at many local gigs and talent shows searching for opportunities and seeking record labels' attention. In 2011, Hazem Alaa left the group for personal reasons. The group continued to record underground tracks until Ayman Seleha went to France for college, thus making it harder to work on projects. In 2012, Mohamed 'Mesho' Magdi, Mohamed Hani and Shahd El Shaarawy recorded a remixed version of the song "Mirror" by Lil Wayne which garnered a relatively adequate number of views on YouTube and which grabbed the attention of talent scouts of the Arabic X Factor. In early 2013 and before the group joined The X Factor, Mohamed Hani left the group also for personal reasons which led to the group taking its final current form. Young Pharoz received an invitation from The X Factor to audition in Beirut for the 2013 season, leading to them being on the show and making it to the finals and landing a record deal with Sony Music International.

== The X Factor ==
Young Pharoz auditioned for the Arabic X Factor in Beirut in front of judges Hussain Al Jasmi, Wael Kfoury, Elissa and Carole Samaha who later became their mentor in the following rounds. In their audition, Young Pharoz remixed the song Invincible by American rapper Machine Gun Kelly who later recognized their version of the song on his Twitter account and Facebook page and praised the band's musical ability. Young Pharoz received 4 Yes's from the judging panel as well as many positive comments about their lyrical ability, Shahd's voice and the technique of their performance. The audition video's YouTube views rocketed to 100,000 views in a matter of hours and later gained more exposure from the international media. After the audition phase ended, the successful contestants were distributed into four categories: Solo Male Artists, Solo Female Artists, Artists Above 25 and Bands. Each judge was assigned a category to mentor making Carole Samaha in charge of bands, six out of the ten bands made it through to the next round: The Judges' Houses. In this round, Young Pharoz performed their own version of the hit "Run This Town" by American rappers Jay-Z and Kanye West and Barbadian singer Rihanna in front of Carole Samaha and Egyptian superstar Ahmed Mekky. Of all the contestants that passed the auditions round, only 13 made it to the live shows, where crowd voting determines the elimination process. Young Pharoz continued to present their original versions of hit international songs throughout the live shows, making it to the semi-final phase, where they lost against Ibrahim Abdel Atheem who later became runner-up.

== Record deal ==
Sony Music Middle East approached the Young Pharoz with a record deal after they were knocked out of The X Factor in the semi-final round, they signed a deal with Sony to record one studio album, release a single and a music video. The first single "Yalla Ben Ne3eesh" was released on June 16, 2014, in both Arabic and English ("Flying the Flag") supporting the FIFA World Cup 2014 and is written and produced by Swedish top songwriter Gustav Efraimsson (Snoop Dogg / New Kids On The Block / Backstreet Boys).

== Live performances ==
Young Pharoz have appeared in many live performances after The X Factor, their first performance was in Elsawy Culture Wheel featuring MTM, Mashro3 Hiphop & Bronx 2 Cairo. In summer 2014, they performed at Porto Marina in the North Coast, Egypt alongside fellow X Factor finalist Adham Nabulsi.

== Reception ==
A remarkable fanbase for Young Pharoz going by the name of 'YPians' started to take shape after The X Factor auditions were broadcast. Young Pharoz were the feature of many news articles in Egypt and the Middle East, where they were perceived by viewers as a phenomenon that didn't before exist in the Arab media scene, due to the fact that they present their music in English and Arabic besides addressing issues that are popular within the Arab community, such as politics and social problems. Many fans started uploading versions of their X Factor performances and the view counts started to witness a significant rise reaching 500,000 views for one of the more popular songs.
