= Helm (album) =

Studio album by Carole Samaha
- Released: 2003
- Genre: Arabic pop
- Length: 34:15
- Language: Arabic
- Label: EMI Music Arabia
- Producer: Megastar

Carole Samaha chronology
Helm (2003)	Ana Horra (2004)

Helm (Arabic: حلم – A Dream) is the first pop album by the Lebanese actress and singer Carole Samaha. It was released in 2003 by EMI Music Arabia. The Rough Guide to World Music: Africa & The Middle East calls it a "deliciously neat production". Following the release of this album, Carole Samaha won the "Best Female Newcomer" award at the Arab Music Awards. She also received the "Best Polyvalent talent (actress and singer)" 2003 Murex d'Or, while the song "Ettalaa fiyi" got the Murex d'Or for "Best Female Romantic Song".

No.	Title	Lyrics	Music	Arranger	Length
1.	"Kif" (How)	Marwan Khoury	Marwan Khoury		3:24
2.	"Gharibi"	Nabeel Abu Abdo	Jean-Marie Riachi	Jean-Marie Riachi	4:42
3.	"Metl el helm"				4:33
4.	"Ana min dounak"				4:11
5.	"Habib Albi"	Marwan Khoury	Marwan Khoury		4:31
6.	"Ettalaa fiyi"	Marwan Khoury	Marwan Khoury		4:45
7.	"Rajee"				3:51
8.	"Addaysh"				4:18
Total length:					34:15

The CD also contains a video clip with the official video for the song "Habib Albi".
