= Boshret Kheir =

Single by Hussain Al Jasmi

Single by Hussain Al Jassmi
- Language: Egyptian Arabic
- Released: 14 May 2014
- Recorded: 2014
- Genre: Shaabi
- Length: 3:48
- Label: Self-released
- Songwriters: Ayman Bahgat Amar; Amr Mostafa

"Boshret Kheir" (Egyptian Arabic: بشرة خير; English: "Good Omen") is a song by Emirati singer Hussain Al Jassmi with the lyrics written by Egyptian songwriter Ayman Bahgat Amar and music written by Egyptian composer Amr Mostafa. Released on 14 May 2014, the song's lyrics were written to encourage participation in the that year's Egyptian presidential election.

With over 700 million views as of April 2025, the music video of the song is among the most-viewed Arabic music videos on YouTube. The song enjoyed success throughout the Middle East, although its status as a patriotic song attracted controversy.

== Background ==
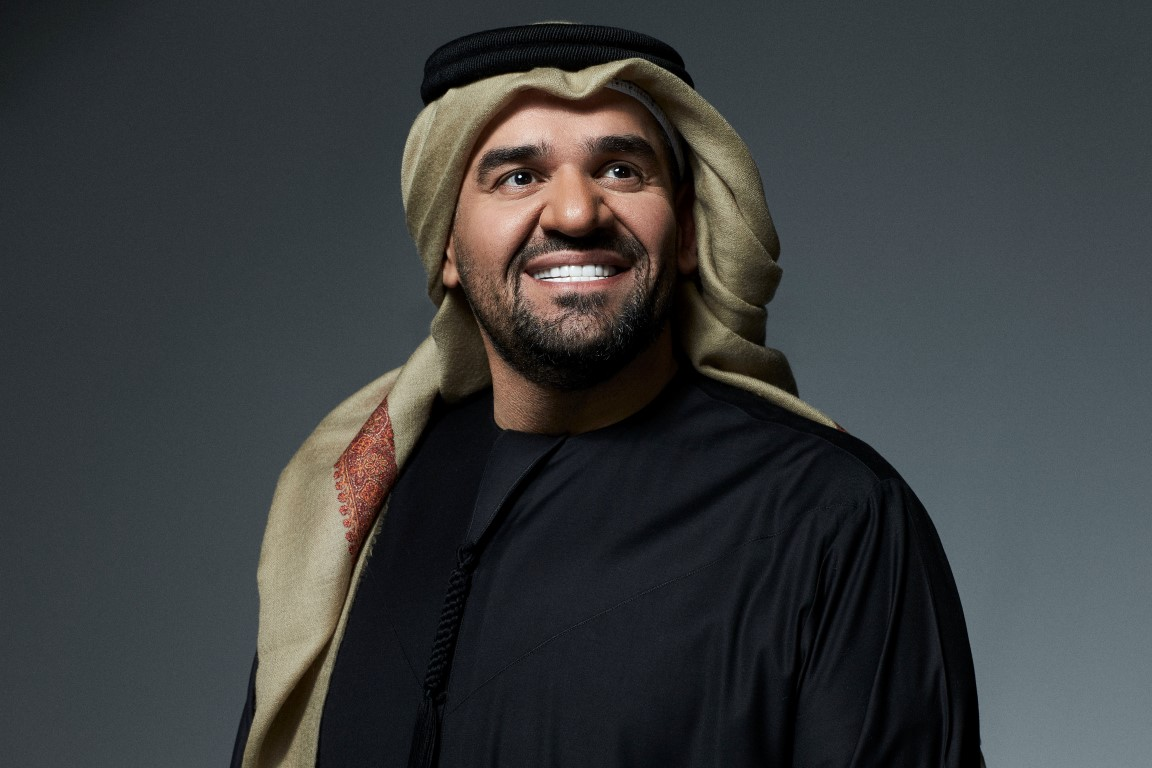
Hussain Al Jassmi performed the song in 2014

Prior to the release of his song "Boshret Kheir," Emirati performer Hussain Al Jassmi had released songs for Egyptians and the nation of Egypt, such as his 2006 song "Bahebk Wahashtini" (Egyptian Arabic: بحبك وحشتيني; English: "I love you, I miss you") for the 2006 Egyptian film El Rahina.

The song was released in the wake of the 2014 Egyptian presidential election, held from 26 to 28 May 2014. These elections were the first to be held since General Abdel Fattah el-Sisi deposed former president Mohamed Morsi in the 2013 Egyptian coup d'état on 3 July 2013. Two candidates stood for election, el-Sisi and Hamdeen Sabahi of the left-leaning Egyptian Popular Current, with el-Sisi widely expected to win. The Muslim Brotherhood, of which Morsi was affiliated, called for boycotts of the election, calling them a "bloody farce." The April 6 Youth Movement also called for boycotts, claiming that the election of el-Sisi would lead to a new dictatorship. Pro-military private television stations and outlets affiliated with the National Media Authority led and popularized campaigns for the public to vote, fearing that a low voter turnout would diminish the legitimacy of the election.

== Lyrics and composition ==
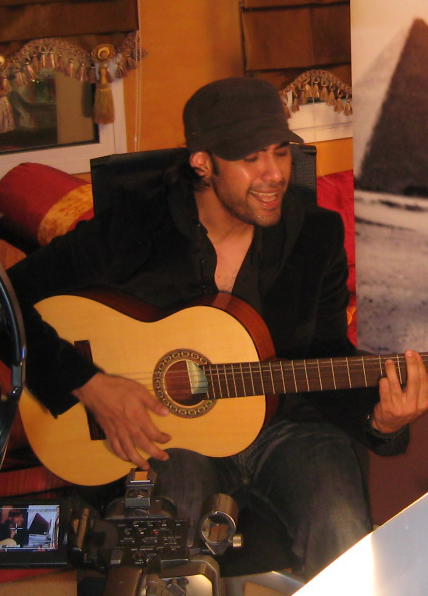
The song's music was written by composer Amr Mostafa

I haven’t sung ‘Boshret Kheir’ for a certain campaign, a certain political party or a certain person, I have presented it for Egyptians, who have lost joy over the past period.

— Al Jassmi, May 2014

The lyrics, written by Egyptian songwriter Ayman Bahgat Kamar, directly call for Egyptians across the country to vote in the elections, with lyrics such as "What has Egypt gained from your silence? Don’t deny it your vote. You’re determining tomorrow on your terms. This is a good omen." The song further calls out different governorates of Egypt, asking the Egyptians living there to take the "small step" of voting after a period of passiveness. The lyrics further call for unity to become stronger and to have a voice for their own future. In an interview on the show Al Qahera Al Youm, Kamar revealed that he wrote the lyrics in one night after he received Mostafa's melody. Although voting encouragement during these elections was largely from supporters of el-Sisi, Al Jassmi maintained that he was impartial and meant for the song to empower all Egyptians "who have lost joy over the past period." Despite Al Jassmi's dismissal, the song became an unofficial anthem for el-Sisi's supporters.

The song's music, written by Egyptian composer Amr Mostafa, is in the shaabi musical style, a genre strongly associated with the Egyptian working-class and faced government censorship during the 1970s and 1980s. "Boshret Kheir" employs a maqsoum drum rhythm, popular in Egyptian urban folk music, along with instruments popular in Egyptian street music such as finger cymbals, goblet drums, and rebab. The Tahrir Institute for Middle East Policy argued that the use of this style and instrumentation helped differentiate the styles of Egyptian patriotic music, which had traditionally been written in the style of anthems or marches. Ethnomusicologist Kawkab Tawfik believed the song to be an example of government appropriation of the shaabi genre, being used to show popular support for el-Sisi's presidency. Further, researchers Mohamed Gameel and Salma ElGhetany believed that the use of a higher tempo and colloquial Egyptian Arabic further contributed to the song's popularity among younger populations in an article for the journal Arab Media & Society.

=== Accusations of plagiarism ===
Egyptian composer Mohamed Rahim accused Mostafa of stealing the melody of the song. Rahim claimed that the beat during the opening portion of the song was copied from the rhythm he wrote for Eman Samir and her song "La Keda Wala Keda" (Arabic: لا كده ولا كده; English: "Neither this way nor that") while the uptempo portion of the song was the same as the rhythm he wrote for Sherine Wagdy's single "Kol Da" (Arabic: كل ده; English: "All of this"). In a post on Twitter, Rahim deemed the situation to be an "assault" on his music, adding that he was "amazed at Amr's ability to reproduce my melodies."

== Release and reception ==
The music video, which Gulf News compared to that of the song "Happy" by American singer Pharrell Williams, features Egyptians dancing across all 27 of the country's governorates, holding placards to encourage fellow Egyptians to participate in the upcoming elections. In the first day of its release, the video amassed a total of 850 thousand views, with 15 million amassed after its first two weeks. The song sparked a viral trend, largely in the Arab world, in which people danced to the song similar to that of the video. The trend has been compared to the Harlem Shake meme by the newspaper Al Arabiya. At present, the video is among the most-viewed Arabic music videos on YouTube with over 714 million views as of April 2025.

Soon after its release, a group of Egyptians established a Facebook page in support of granting Al Jassmi Egyptian citizenship. In a post by the group, they claimed that he "has loved Egypt more than some Egyptians," adding that "day after day, he proves that he loves Egypt and Egyptians from his heart." In a period which the newspaper Daily News Egypt dubbed "Al-Sisi mania" in the weeks following the election, the song was noted to have been played at bridal entrances at weddings.

The song, deemed a "musical signature of Egypt's Sisi years" by the Tahrir Institute, garnered renewed interest during the period around the 2018 Egyptian presidential election. On 14 March 2018, Al Jassmi released another song in support of elections, titled "Mesaa El Kheer" (Egyptian Arabic: مساء الخير; English: "Good Evening"). While it didn't mention or feature el-Sisi explicitly, signs featuring his campaign slogan, "Tahya Masr" (Egyptian Arabic: تحيا مصر; English: "Long Live Egypt"), featured extensively throughout the music video.

Arab News considered the song to be one of the Arabic songs that defined the 2010s in a piece released in December 2019.

=== Criticism ===
In an interview with newspaper Youm7, Egyptian artist Hany Shaker voiced concern with the song's popularity, arguing that many Egyptian singers had released patriotic songs and that the Egpytian media industry should support and promote domestic artists. Further, many Egyptians raised displeasure over the fact that the music video depicted Egypt in a light-hearted way during a period of political tension following the 2013 coup. Criticism was also lodged towards Mostafa for his alleged affiliation with Hosni Mubarak.

In a semiotic analysis of the song's music video, Gameel and ElGhetany found the music video to be unrepresentative of Egypt and its population. Of the 237 locations clearly featured in the video, only 89, or 37%, were outside of the Greater Cairo area. Further, of the 444 people featured, only 58, or 13%, were women. The two researchers believed this to be an attempt to portray Egypt as a male-dominated, Cairo-centric society.

== Other versions ==
In July 2019, K-pop group B.I.G released a cover version of the song as part of their "Global Cover Project," garnering 57,000 views in the first day of a release, with the majority of comments in Arabic. The group released covers of other Arabic songs during the project, including The5's "La Bezzaf," Abu and Yousra's "3 Daqat," and Saad Lamjarred's "LM3ALLEM."
