= The Lebanese Kitchen =

2012 cookbook by Salma Hage

The Lebanese Kitchen is a 2012 cookbook of Lebanese cuisine by Salma Hage. It was published by Phaidon Press. It was reissued in 2019 as The Lebanese Cookbook.

The book also features recipes from Greg Malouf and Anissa Helou. The book has six different versions of the Lebanese national dish kibbeh and eight versions of hummus. It is more than 500 pages in length. The book is illustrated with photographs of rural Lebanon.

Hage immigrated to the United Kingdom from Lebanon aged 25. She was the eldest of 12 children. Her mother was 13 when she was born. She spent almost 30 years as a cleaner and cook at the Nelson Hospital in Wimbledon and various care homes in southwest London. Hage's son approached Phaidon Press with a mock-up of a book of Lebanese cuisine by her and invited publishing executives to dine at their home. They were immediately impressed, and the book was subsequently published.

== Reception ==
Reviewing the book for The Washington Post, Jane Touzalin praised the recipes as "solid and satisfying". She criticised the lack of headnotes and the scalloped cut of the book, which resulted in pages being stuck together. She felt the timing of the recipes preparations was over optimistic writing "Twenty to 30 minutes to make the caramelized onions, wilted spinach, egg filling and candied nuts, and to butter and arrange 96 squares of phyllo dough? Maybe if you’re a Lebanese grandmother" but concluded the "results were more than worth the effort".

Chef Shaun Hill reviewed the book for The Caterer. He wrote that it was "more reference book than short inspirational read" and likened the scope of the book to the Italian cookbook The Silver Spoon. Hill described Malouf's recipe for chickpea-battered courgette flowers stuffed with goat's cheese and mint as "like the essence of summer".

The Metro newspaper praised the book as a "really generous compendium that rewards the committed cook" but critiqued the lack of introductions and authorial voice with an "otherwise useful preamble" written in the third-person perspective, which made Hage "[feel] like a stranger".

Writing in The Times, Alex Renton felt that the book should "restore one of the great crossover cuisines to its rightful place" and that Hage deserved to be a "Lebanese national hero". He felt the hummus was "luscious ... blindingly better than the bland, over-processed stuff you get in the shops".
