= Salma Hage =

Lebanese author and cook (born 1942)

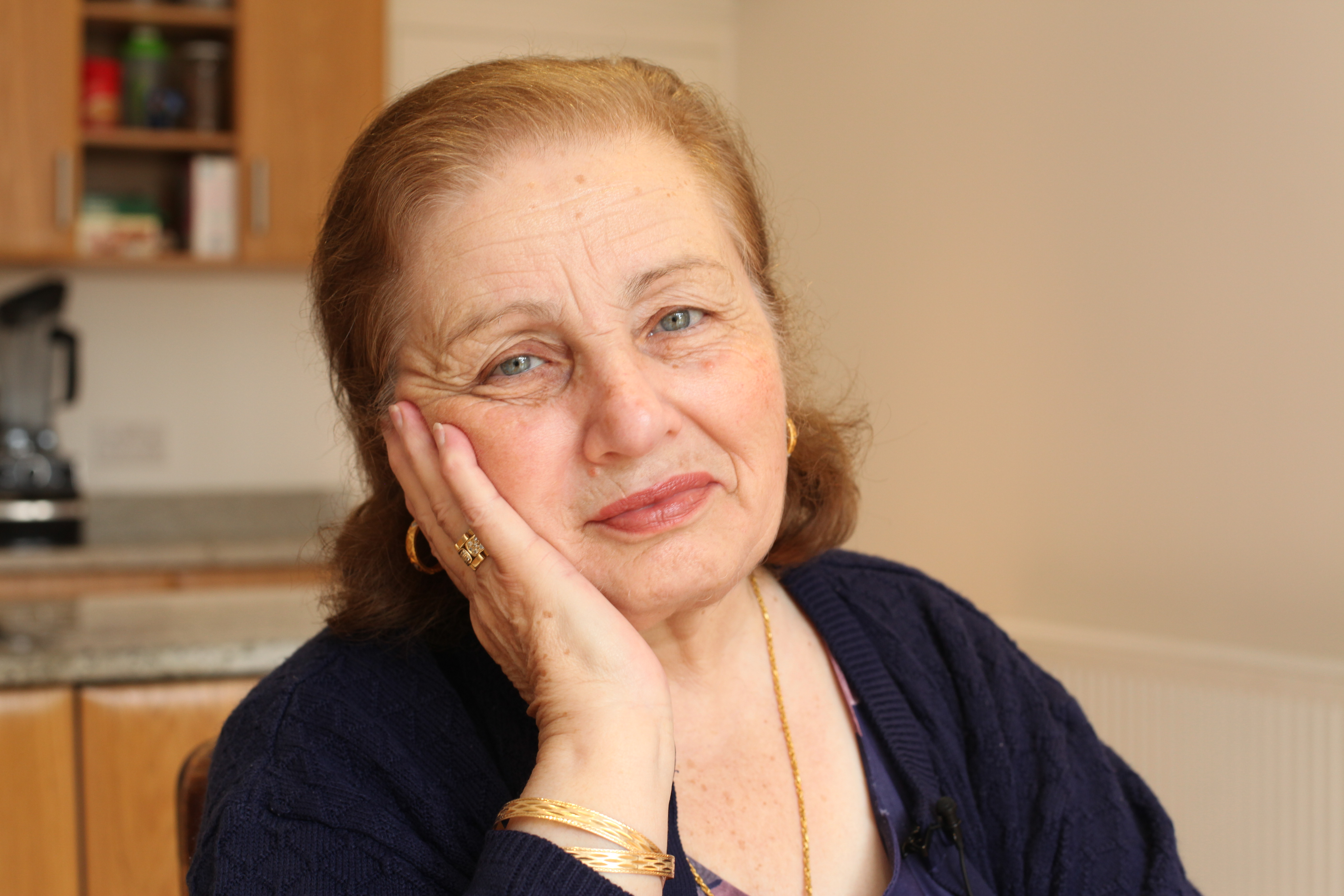
Salma Hage

Salma Hage (born 8 January 1942) is a Lebanese author and cook. She is the author of the bestselling cookbook The Lebanese Kitchen. Her second book The Middle Eastern Vegetarian Cookbook won her the James Beard Award in the Vegetable Cooking category.

Hage was born in Mazraat El Toufah in northern Lebanon in 1942. Her father was a Maronite priest, and she was the eldest of 12 children, learning cookery skills from her grandmother. In 1967 she moved with her family to Wimbledon in south London, UK. She worked as a kitchen hand in her mid-twenties, then worked her way up to the role of head chef for a large catering organisation, learning to appreciate English cuisine while also using the flavours of Lebanon.

In 2012 Salma wrote The Lebanese Kitchen for Phaidon Press. A definitive guide to traditional cuisine from Lebanon, the cookery book contains more than five hundred of her recipes from her fifty years’ experience of cooking. The second cookbook followed in 2016 with one hundred and fifty new recipes in line with the current Western trends of consciously reducing meat, and the ancient Middle Eastern culture of largely vegetarian, mezze style dining, with many options for Vegan and Gluten free diets. Michelin chef Alain Ducasse authored the foreword for this prequel which later won great acclaim including recognition as the James Beard Award Winner in 2017, in the Vegetable Cooking category.

== Works ==
- Hage, Salma (2024). The Levantine Vegetarian. London: Phaidon Press, ISBN 978-1838667641
- Hage, Salma (2021). Middle Eastern Sweets. London: Phaidon Press, ISBN 978-1838663384
- Hage, Salma (2018). The Middle Eastern Mezze Cookbook. London: Phaidon Press, ISBN 978-0714876856
- Hage, Salma (2016). The Middle Eastern Vegetarian Cookbook. London: Phaidon Press, ISBN 978-0714871301
- Hage, Salma (2012). The Lebanese Kitchen. London: Phaidon Press, ISBN 978-0714864808
