= Carole Samaha =

Lebanese-Egyptian singer and actress (born 1972)

Carole Samaha كارول سماحة
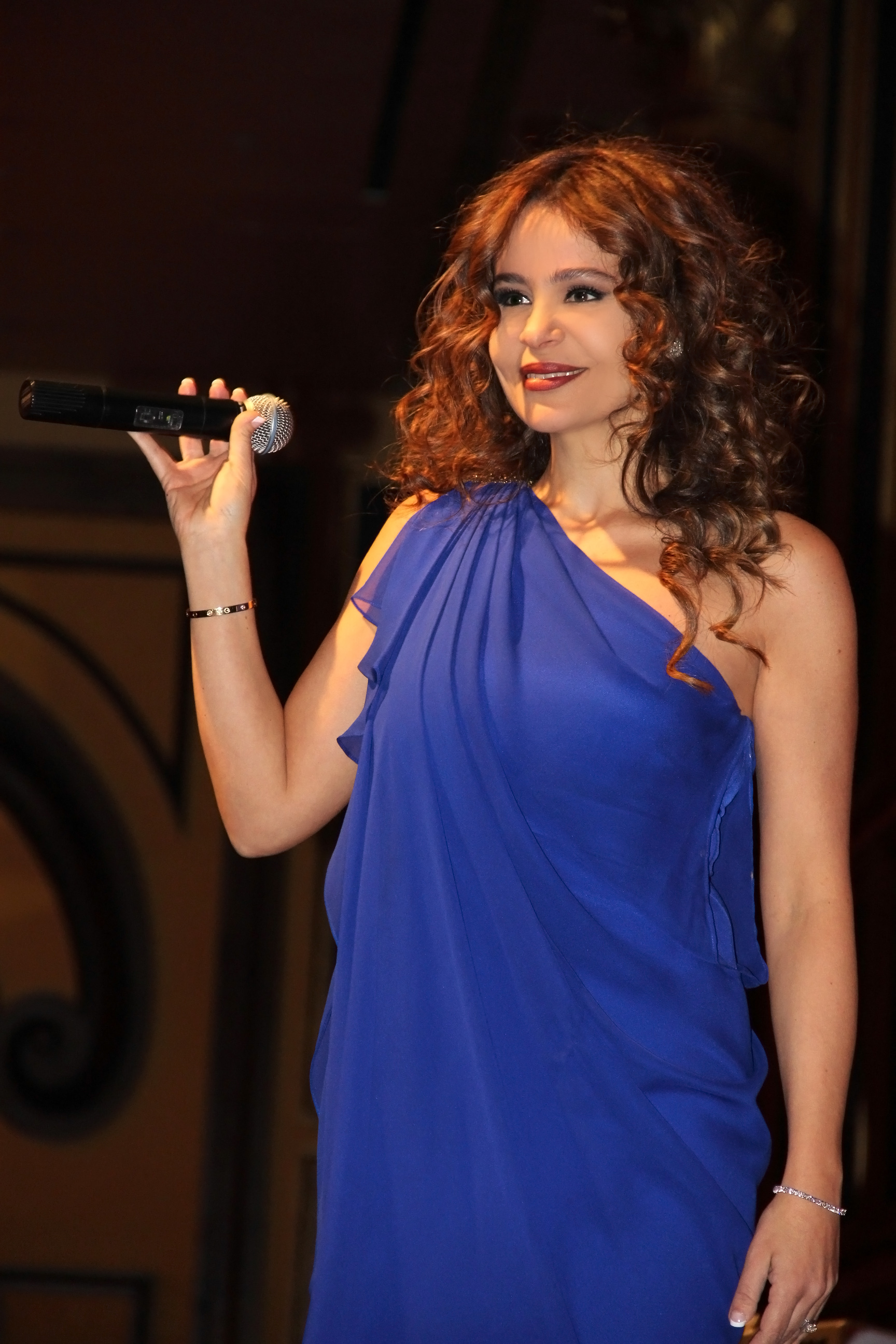
- Samaha in 2013

Background information
- Born: July 25, 1972 (age 54); Beirut, Lebanon
- Genre: Arabic pop music
- Occupations: Singer, actress
- Years active: 1999–present
- Spouse: Walid Mostafa (m. 2013; died 2025)
- Website: carolesamaha.com

Carole Samaha (Arabic: كارول سماحة; born July 25, 1972) is a Lebanese singer, actress, and performer. She has released six studio albums. Samaha has a Master's degree in acting and directing, which she earned in 1999 from the Saint Joseph University of Beirut.

In 2004, she won the Arab Music Award for Best Female Newcomer. She has also won multiple Murex d'Or awards and was nominated for Best Arabian Act at the MTV Europe Music Awards 2008.

Before starting her pop music career, Carole Samaha was a classical actress and worked extensively with Mansour Rahbani and Marwan Rahbani. Her first music single was Bi Sabah el Alf el Talet in 2000.

In 2007, Carole Samaha returned to the theater to play Zenobia in the Rahbani musical with the same name. She established her own production company, Lacarma, in 2009. In 2011, Carole Samaha starred in the TV series Al Shahroura, broadcast during Ramadan, as the singer and actress Sabah. In 2013, she was a judge on The X Factor (Arabic TV series) and she was the mentor for Young Pharoz, Maraya and Les Bledards Ninja. Later that year, she created the musical show "The Lady", produced by Rotana, which premiered on August 10, 2013.

== Early life ==
Samaha was born on July 25, 1972, in Beirut to Antoine Samaha from Khenchara, Metn, a direct relative of Lebanese politician Shafik Mebarak Samaha (who left Zahlé, Lebanon for Colombia at the beginning of the 20th century) and Nouhad Hawi from Dhour El Choueir, Metn. Through the former, she is also related to Shafik Mebarak, nephew of Shakira. She has two brothers. Her parents supported different political factions, and according to Samaha that fact made her become "more open" to the different views of people, learning a great deal from that experience.

== Personal life ==
On November 1, 2013, Samaha married Walid Mustafa, an Egyptian businessman, in a civil ceremony in Limassol, Cyprus, following an 18-month courtship and short engagement. On August 31, 2015, Carole Samaha gave birth to a baby girl, Tala. She is a Maronite Christian. She holds both Lebanese and Egyptian citizenships, and in 2014 she began residing in Egypt with her late husband.

== Discography ==
=== Album ===
2003	Helm (حلم – A Dream)
2003	Oughniat El Toufoula (اغنية الطفولة – Children Songs)
2004	Ana Horra (انا حرة – I'm Free)
2006	Adwa' Al Shohra (أضواء الشهرة – Lights of Fame)
2009	Hdoudi Sama (حدودي السما – The Sky Is My Limit)
2013	Ehssas (إحساس – A Feeling)
2016	Zekrayati (ذكرياتي – Memories)
2020	Christmas Carole (Christmas songs)

=== Single ===
Year	Song	Album	Lebanese Charts	Egyptian Charts	Translation	Notes
2003	Oughniat El Toufoula	Oughniat El Toufoula			Childhood Songs	
2003	Habib Alby	Helm	3	1	My Love	First release apart from the Rahbani
2004	Etalaa Feyi	Helm	1	4	Look at Me	Casting Mister Lebanon 1997 Ghassan El Mawla
2005	Ghali Alayi	Ana Horra	1	3	You Mean A Lot To Me	
2005	Nezlet El Sitara	Ana Horra	48	32	The Curtain Fell	
2005	Habbeit Delwa't	Ana Horra	28	2	Now That I Loved	Movie soundtrack
2006	Esmaani	Adwa' Al Shohra	1	19	Listen To Me	
2006	Zaelni Mennak	Adwa' Al Shohra	1	18	I'm Upset With You	
2007	Adwa'a El Shohra	Adwa' Al Shohra	13	78	Lights of Fame	Sponsored by Pepsi
2007	Ya Rabi	Ana Wel Leil – Marwan Khoury	1	3	Oh God	Ft. Marwan Khoury
2008	Yama Layali	Hdoudi Sama	43	3	How Many Nights	Sponsored by Pepsi
2008	Jeet (Majnouni)	Pepsi Sea of Stars – V/A, Hdoudi Sama	1	3	You Came (I Must Be Crazy)	Movie soundtrack
2008	Ali	Hdoudi Sama	7	1	Ali	Promotional single
2009	Laily Lail	The Gipsy Man Sings from the Middle East – Mario Reyes			–	Ft. Mario Reyes, filmed in Morocco
2009	Rag'aalak	Hodoudi Sama	1	9	Coming Back To You	Promotional single
2009	Zabahny	Hodoudi Sama	97	112	"Slaughtered" Me	Promotional single
2009	Ma Bkhaf	Hodoudi Sama	1	1	I Am Not Scared	First official single
2010	A'oul Ansak	Hodoudi Sama	1	1	I Try To Forget You	Second official single
2010	Khallik Bhalak	Hodoudi Sama	1	1	Stay Away	
2011	El Masry Ya Abu Dam	—N/a				
2011	Malika Ala El Ard	—N/a			Queen on Earth	A song from the TV series Al Shahroura
2012	Wahshani Bladi	—N/a			I Miss My Country	
2012	Weta'awadet	Ehssas			And I Got Used [To It]	
2013	Ehssas	Ehssas			Feeling	
2014	Sahranin	—N/a	7		We're Partying/Staying Up	Written by Samaha, in collaboration with composer Mohamed Raheem, and arranged by Sleiman Damien. Popular in the nightlife scene.
2016	Rouh Fell	—N/a	17		Leave	Top one in the Arab world on the music streaming service Anghami.
2017	Rejih Albi	—N/a	7		My Heart Is Back	
2018	Ensa Hmoumak	—N/a	5		Forget Your Worries	
2018	Mabrouk La Albi	—N/a	15		Congratulations To My Heart	
2019	Bet'amen Bel Sodfi	—N/a	4		Do You Believe In Change	
2020	Bon Voyage	—N/a	5		_	Co-written by Samaha. Top charting on Anghami
2021	Ya Shabab Ya Banat	—N/a	5		Hey Boys And Girls	
2022	Fawda	—N/a	1		Chaos	
2026	"Rise Up"(with Leona Lewis, Rita Ora & Rashed Al Nuaimi)	—N/a				

== Awards ==
- "Revelation Of The Year" (actress and singer) Murex d'Or in 2000.
- "Best Female Newcomer" at the Arab Music Awards (2003) – This was the first year in which the Arab Music Awards were awarded and the ceremony was held in Dubai in May 2004.
- "Best Polyvalent Talent" (actress and singer) Murex d'Or in 2003.
- "Best Female Romantic Song" for ("Tallaa Fiyyi") Murex d'Or in 2003.
- "Best Lebanese Female Singer" Murex d'Or in 2007.
- "Best Lebanese Song" ("Ya Rab", with Marwan Khoury) Murex d'Or in 2007.
- "Album Of The Year" (Hdoudi Sama, 2009) Murex d'Or in June 2010.
- "Best Music Video" – "Khalik Behalak" – at the 2011 Murex d'Or ceremony.
- World Music Award for "Best Stage Performer in the Middle East" in Monaco 2014.
