= Maaroub =

Maaroub معروب
- Municipality
- Location within Lebanon
- Coordinates: 33°17′03″N 35°20′50″E
- Grid position: 113/150 L
- Country: Lebanon
- Governorate: South Governorate
- District: Tyre

Area
  - Total: 5.62 km^{2} (2.17 sq mi)
  - Land: 5.62 km^{2} (2.17 sq mi)
  - Water: 0 km^{2} (0 sq mi) 0%
- Elevation: 270 m (890 ft)

Population (2018)
  - Total: 3,600
  - Density: 640/km^{2} (1,700/sq mi)
- Time zone: +2
  - Summer (DST): +3

Maaroub (Arabic: معروب, romanized: Maʿrūb) is a municipality in the Tyre District of Southern Lebanon's South Governorate. It is characterized by a blend of old and new architecture. The town is divided into two parts: the old town, and the modern one that has recently arisen.

== Etymology ==
According to E. H. Palmer, the name Marub comes from abounding in water. It has been suggested that the name Maaroub means a "land of great abundance and goodness." It has been also suggested that it means that it is perfect land for agriculture where the agriculture of olive, tobacco, wheat and figs flourish.

== Location ==
Maaroub is located in the South Governorate, Tyre District. It is 270 m above sea level and 88 kilometres to the south-west of Beirut, the capital city of Lebanon, or about an hour and a half, and 15 km from the center of its district Tyre. Its land area is 562 hectares. It is home to 3,600 registered residents.

== History ==
Maaroub is known for its historical monuments, one of those being Cave of Al-Saliha. The Cave of Al-Saliha is located in the middle of the village; specifically, in the old village. The aforementioned cave has the following story, according to local folklore: A pious woman had a shrine she would frequent. Whenever she (mysteriously) appeared; a very beautiful scent would emanate. Thus, it is said that people would visit that place to light candles and pray. This cave dates back at least to Ottoman times.

In 1875, Victor Guérin noted it as "a small village called Ain Ma'roub. It owes its existence to a nearby spring, which flows into the wadi itself and waters fig and pomegranate trees. The population of this village can be estimated at a hundred Metualis. It succeeded an ancient locality; for I see here and there several ashlars and a small Corinthian capital in white marble embedded in the wall of a private house, which, I was told, were found on the spot."

In 1881, the PEF's Survey of Western Palestine (SWP) described it as: "Mud and stone village, containing about 200 Metawileh, built on the side of a hill, with figs and arable land around. Water from cisterns and a spring."

=== Building ===
Maaroub was once home to a collection of old houses constructed using traditional methods that markedly differ from contemporary building practices. The conventional technique involved the application of a mixture known as "Madlakeh", consisting of dirt and mud shaped into stones.

== Demographics ==
In 2014 Muslims made up 99.84% of registered voters in Maaroub. 98.54% of the voters were Shiite Muslims.

== Notable people ==
- Ahmad Chhadeh; a Lebanese music produce and founder and CEO of Arabsong Production
- Salah Ezzedine, Lebanese businessman arrested for running a pyramid scheme
- Muhammad Fneish; a Shia Lebanese politician and member of Hezbollah.
- Hussein Fneish (Arabic: حسين فنيش) (October 14, 1993-) is a Lebanese actor. He was born in Maaroub Tyre District. He participated in commercial advertisements, then moved to acting in 2016, where he participated in many works.

== Bibliography ==
- Conder, C.R.; Kitchener, H.H. (1881). The Survey of Western Palestine: Memoirs of the Topography, Orography, Hydrography, and Archaeology. Vol. 1. London: Committee of the Palestine Exploration Fund.
- Guérin, V. (1880). Description Géographique Historique et Archéologique de la Palestine (in French). Vol. 3: Galilee, pt. 2. Paris: L'Imprimerie Nationale.
- Palmer, E.H. (1881). The Survey of Western Palestine: Arabic and English Name Lists Collected During the Survey by Lieutenants Conder and Kitchener, R. E. Transliterated and Explained by E.H. Palmer. Committee of the Palestine Exploration Fund.
