= Mazraat Al Toufah =

Village in Zgharta District, Lebanon

Mazraat Al Toufah Arabic: مزرعة التفاح
- Village
- Location within Lebanon
- Coordinates: 34°19′N 35°56′E
- Country: Lebanon
- Governorate: North Governorate
- District: Zgharta District

Government
- Time zone: UTC+2 (EET)
  - Summer (DST): UTC+3 (EEST)
- Dialing code: +961

Mazraat Al Toufah (Arabic: مزرعة التفاح, romanized: Mazraʿat at-Tufāḥ), also spelled Mazraat Et Teffah and Mazraat Et-Teffah, is a village in Zgharta District, in the Northern Governorate of Lebanon. It is 123 kilometres (76 mi) from Beirut, the capital of Lebanon.

The population is primarily Maronite Christian.

== Notable people ==
- Salma Hage, author and cook
- General Afif Saleh
- Marwan Khoury, singer.
- Colonel Joseph Ramia, who was killed with president René Moawad in a car bomb.
