= Walid Mostafa =

Egyptian businessman (1972–2025)

Walid Mostafa Hasan
- Born: Walid Mostafa Hasan; 15 January 1972; Giza, Egypt
- Died: 3 May 2025 (aged 53)
- Education: Cairo University; American University in Cairo
- Spouse: Carole Samaha (m. 2013)
- Children: 2

Walid Mostafa (Egyptian Arabic: وليد مصطفى; born Walid Mostafa Hasan; 15 January 1972 – 3 May 2025) was an Egyptian media businessman. He was the director of international NRJ EGYPT radio station (one of the first French stations to broadcast in Arabic). Mostafa also founded Youm7 newspaper in 2007, and Al-Nahar television channel in 2011. He worked in the field of visual, audible, and readable media, marketing and advertising. He was a member of the Egyptian Junior Business Association (EJB) and the International Advertising Association (IAA). He was also a member of the Egyptian Public Relation Association (EPRA) and the Journalist Association, as well as a member of the Syndicate of Pharmacists.

== Early life ==
Walid Mostafa was born on 15 January 1972 in Giza, Egypt. He was homeschooled until the first year of high school, after which he studied abroad through a student exchange program between Egypt and the United States of America. He spent his last two years of high school at Benjamin High School in Florida. Mostafa graduated from the faculty of pharmacy at Cairo University and then was accredited a DPS (Diploma in Professional Studies) from the American University in Cairo.

== Career ==
Mostafa served as marketing manager for the Arab Egyptian Studios Company Platouh from 1996 to 1998. He went on to serve as director of sales and marketing at the Promoters Company For Publicity and Advertising between 1998 and 2000. From 2000 to 2011 he served as managing director and contributing partner for High Class Media and Elite magazine.

He was managing director and contributing partner in Nile PR Company from 2000 to 2011. He worked in production management and as a partner producing many television shows and drama series such as the T.V. series Adam in 2007 with Tamer Hosny.

Mostafa was the chairman of Sky Media Production, which owns NRJ EGYPT. Considered a new form of radio broadcasting in Egypt, NRJ Egypt targets a youth audience. It is the Arabic station of NRJ International. Launched officially in Egypt, it is just one station in the NRJ radio network which broadcasts in Europe and in twenty other countries around the world. Originating from the French NRJ station, NRJ Egypt presents Arabic, English, and French programs for its audience, as well as news and trends. In 2011, Mostafa founded Trenta Media Production, owner of the Al-Nahar television channels. He established the headquarters and the studios of Al-Nahar television network, and formed the board of directors and contributors. He was responsible for discussing the television show's proposed by the board of directors, as well as having a media plan to promote them. Al-Nahar general channel was awarded second place in Ramadan 2011 according to the results of Taylor Nelson Sofres (TNS) and 9th place according to IPSOS –YouTube Channel. As well, Al-Nahar drama channel, according to the results of IPSOS, had strong viewership. Al-Nahar channel exclusively covered many political, sports, and arts events. Mostafa also put in place a strategy and vision for the company's expansion. It now has five channels and is rated third according to the latest study by IPSOS in January 2014.

He was the chairman, managing director, and shareholder partner of the Egyptian company specialising in journalism, publishing, and advertising Al-Youm El-Sabea − Youm7 newspaper with Editor-in-Chief Khaled Salah from 2007 to 2013. Al-Youm El-Sabea became a media foundation including a website, the printed edition, and all other editions and media forms. Al-Youm El-Sabea became a foundation establishment with assets in other mass media production companies and television. The foundation guarantees the effectiveness of management, and the spread, distribution, and marketing of both the newspaper and the website. Al-Youm El-Sabea was awarded the Forbes award for two consecutive years as the most important Arab website. He also contributed to the expansion of computerized specializations of sub-editions of Al-Youm El-Sabea, as well as expanding the Internet services in general to more than just newsletters. He expanded newsletter services from Youm7 to smartphones (Vodafone – Orange (former Mobinil) – Etisalat Misr), as well as opening mutual collaboration between the Arab and international telecom companies through its computerized services in countries like Saudi Arabia, AUE. Youm7 became among the top three newspapers in the independent printed journalism market. It won the Forbes Middle East award for two consecutive years 2010–2011 as one of the major Arabic websites in the Arab world.

== Personal life and death ==
Walid Mostafa Hasan was the only son of Mostafa Hasan, who was a primary consultant of the Presidency of the Republic National Councils. Walid Mostafa had two daughters: Amina by his first marriage; and Tala with his second wife, the Lebanese singer Carole Samaha whom he married in Cyprus in 2013.

Mostafa died on 3 May 2025, at the age of 53.
