= Salah Ezzedine =

Lebanese businessman

- صلاح عز الدين
- Born: 1962 (age 63–64); South Lebanon
- Occupation: Businessman
- Known for: Arrested for running a pyramid scheme

Salah Ezzedine (born in 1962 in South Lebanon) is a Lebanese businessman who is accused and arrested for running a pyramid scheme. He had supposedly investments in oil, publishing, metals and television, and his businesses spread out from the Gulf to Africa.

== Career ==
Before the fraud scandal occurred, he was known for his generosity and had built a stadium and largely financed a mosque for his hometown of Maaroub, Lebanon. He was known as the owner of Dar el-Hadi, a publishing house that published books on Hezbollah and on religious themes based in the Shiite neighborhood of Dahieh, a stronghold of Hezbollah, and Al Mustathmir, a money management financial institution.

=== Fraud ===
Ezzedine's close ties to Hezbollah led many Lebanese Shiite investors to invest with him, even though he did not show them any paperwork. He named two of his businesses after the son of the Hezbollah leader, Hassan Nasrallah. Hundreds of Lebanese sold land or took money out of their retirement savings, joined by well-off investors, to invest hundreds of millions of dollars with him, as he promised annual returns of as much as 80%.

In the ensuing debacle, financial downfall and declaring of his bankruptcy, Lebanese investors, mostly from the Shia community, lost hundreds of million dollars. Amounts involved vary between $700 million to 1.2 billion dollars was lost by Lebanese investors Hezbollah security officers arrested Ezzedine on his way to the airport as he attempted to flee and made him transfer his remaining assets to Hezbollah before they turned him over to the Lebanese authorities. Bankers said it was the largest fraud of its kind that Lebanon had ever seen.

Ezzedine was charged with fraud and fraudulent embezzlement, a crime punishable by 15 years in prison, distributing invalid checks, and violating Lebanese fiscal laws in September 2009, and was jailed.
