= Adham Nabulsi =

Jordanian Palestinian musician

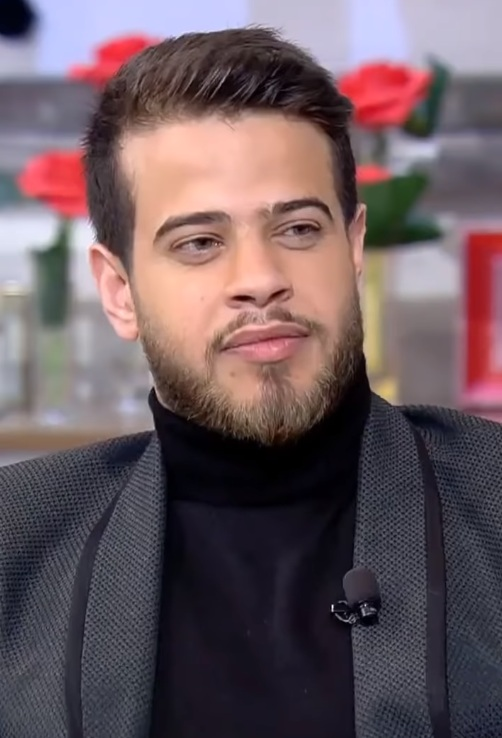
- Adham Nabulsi guest of MTV Lebanon, March 2020
- Born: Adham Diab Farid Alnabulsi أدهم دياب فريد النابلسي; 20 November 1993 (age 32)
- Occupations: Vocalist; songwriter; composer; music arranger; producer
- Years active: 2013–2021
- Musical career
- Genre: Arab pop
- Instruments: Piano; guitar; violin; harmonica; accordion; synthesizer; clarinet
- Label: AL Production
- Website: facebook.com/adham.nabulsi

Adham Nabulsi (Arabic: أدهم نابلسي, born 20 November 1993) is a Jordanian Palestinian former singer, producer, composer, and songwriter. He debuted on television when he participated on The X Factor (Arabic TV series). Citing religious reasons, Adham Nabulsi retired from the music industry on December 20, 2021.

== The X Factor Arabia ==
In 2013, Adham auditioned for the first series of the Arabic televised singing competition The X Factor Arabia and he came in third place.

== Discography ==
=== Singles ===
- Ossetna Kholset (2013)
- La Baed Khlena (2014)
- Chafei' El Nas (2014)
- Keef Bhebak Hayk (2015)
- Abali Wadda3ak (2016)
- Ma beshbaa mennik (2016)
- El Nehayeh El Saideh (2016)
- Naskha Mennik (2016)
- Meshta (2017)
- Shedni Ghmorni (2017)
- Taabalni (2018)
- Howeh El Hob (2018)
- Hada Ma Byentasa (2019)
- Btaaref Shuur (2020)
- Hathi Ente W Hatha Ana (2020)
- Mish Ayb (2020)
- Han AlAn (2020)
- Khayef (2021)

== Videography ==
Official music videos
Year	Title	Album	Director
2016	Naskha Mennik	Single	Mahmoud Ramzi
2017	Meshta	Single	Bahaa Khadaj
2017	Shedni Ghmorni	Single	Bahaa Khadaj
2018	Howeh El Hob	Single	Bahaa Khadaj
2019	Hada Ma Byentasa	Single	Bahaa Khadaj
2020	Btaaref Shuur	Single	Yasser Sami
2020	Hathi Ente W Hatha Ana	Single	Omar Rammal
2021	Khayef	Single	Omar Rammal
