= Abeer Nehme =

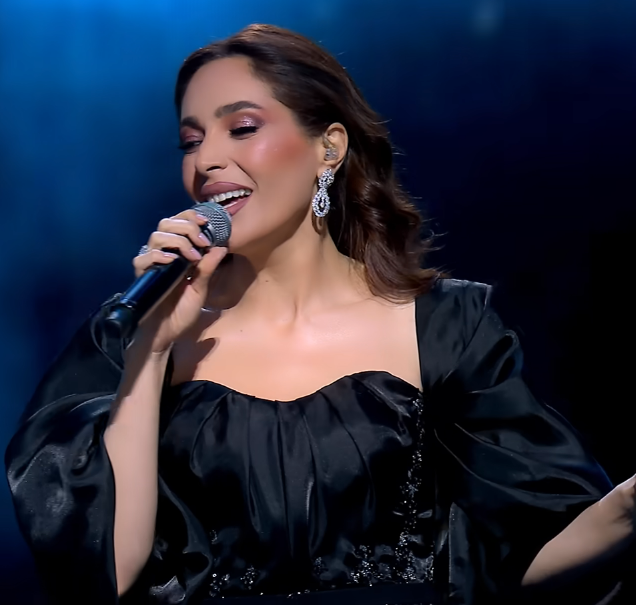

Background information
- Born: 19 May 1980 (age 46); Tannourine, Lebanon
- Genres: Syriac sacral music
- Website: http://www.abeernehme.com

Abeer Nehme (Arabic: عبير نعمة; born 19 May 1980) is a Lebanese singer and a musicologist. She performs traditional Tarab music, Lebanese traditional music, Rahbani music, and sacred music from the Maronite, Syriac Orthodox, and Byzantine traditions.

== Biography ==
Abeer Nehme has been referred to as "the all-styles specialist" because of her talent in performing dialogues between different styles of music, such as Oriental model traditional styles, Lebanese styles, Maronite-Syriac ethnic style, Greek Byzantine religious style, and opera and modern Western styles.

Abeer is a qanun player, a traditional Levantine instrument, and earned a bachelor's degree with the highest grade ever earned in oriental singing from Holy Spirit University of Kaslik. She was a student of Aida Chalhoub, director of the oriental music program at USEK. Lebanese, Arab, Greek and Syriac audiences quickly recognized her renowned talent.

As a professional in traditional Christian Arabic music, Abeer interpreted, amongst other interpretations, a complete album of traditional Orthodox Syriac language chants with the Syrian National Symphony Orchestra under the patronage of the Syriac Patriarch of Antioch, Ignatius Zakka I.

As an Oriental modern singer, she played the leading role in various musical plays. Abeer participated as a guest amongst superstars at international festivals and performed as a soloist at several concerts accompanied by various international philharmonic orchestras. One of the compositions, "Abirou Salati" (Aroma of my prayer), is a journey through different styles of music, from the old music traditions of the fathers of the church, traditions of prayer and profound spiritualism, to the modernism of the people of God in the twenty-first century, a modernism of grandiosity and majesty.

In 2009, she joined Jean-Marie Riachi for the album Belaaks. The song "Belaaks" ("On the Contrary) is a duet with Ramy Ayach and is an oriental jazz arrangement of "Quizás, Quizás, Quizás" in the Lebanese Arabic.

== Music ==
2009: Aroma of My Prayer - Nehme released one CD titled Aroma of My Prayer that represents a panorama of the sacred music from the Syriac Orthodox, Maronite, Byzantine, and Armenian traditions as well as the contemporary religious chants of major composers.

2009: Bel Aks - Nehme is the main singer on Jean Marie Riachi's album Bil Aks released in 2009. Her next release is a western music CD in English produced by Darren Michealson (21st Artist Century).

2010: Only The Desert Knows

2018: Abeer Nehme and Marcel Khalife - Sing A Little (غني قليلاً)

2019: Hikaya (حكاية)

2021: Byeb'a Nas

2021: Bala Ma Nhess, a chart topping collaboration with song-writer Nabil Khoury, and music producer Sleiman Damien.

== Awards and titles ==
- 2000 The award of the Lebanese Diva Wadih Safi, Lebanon
- 2007 Honor Award from the Apostiliki Diakonia, Greece
- 2010 the Murex D'Or distinction award.

== Theatre ==
In 2006, Nehme appeared with Fairuz in a play for the Rahbani brothers at the Baalbeck International Festival. In 2007, Nehme interpreted the leading female role in Andalusia, Jewel of the world, a play by Elias Rahbani produced by the House of Thani, the royal family of Qatar, and Moza bint Nasser. She played the leading role in Elias Rahbani's play Ila.

== Movies ==
Nehme recorded all the songs of the Al-Bosta movie sound track produced by Fantascope production and directed by Philippe Aractingi.
