= Anoushka (Egyptian singer) =

Egyptian singer and actress (born 1960)

- أنوشكا
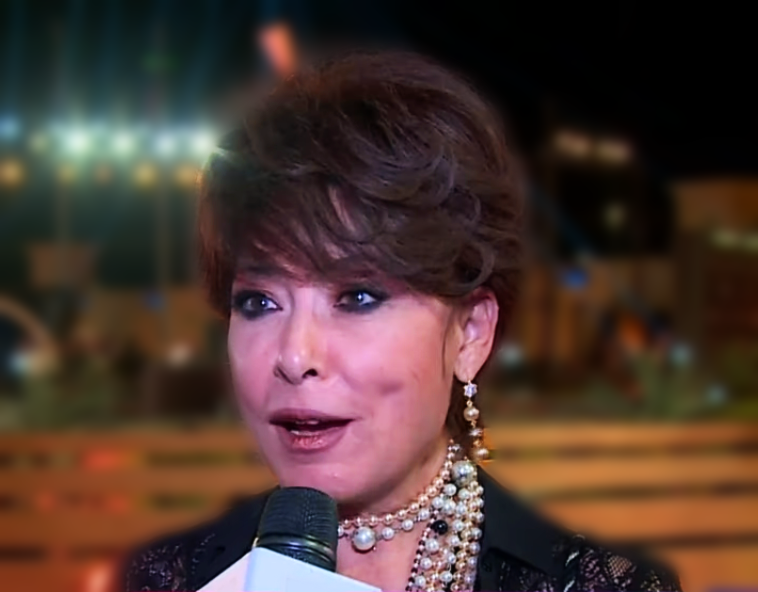
- Born: Vartanoush Garbis Selim; ڤرتانوش جاربيس سليم; March 9, 1960 (age 66); Heliopolis, Cairo, Egypt
- Education: American University of Cairo
- Musical career
- Genres: Egyptian
- Occupations: Singer; actor
- Years active: 1987–present

Vartanoush Garbis Selim (Arabic: ڤرتانوش جاربيس سليم; better known by her stage name Anoushka (Arabic: أنوشكا), is an Egyptian singer and actress.

== Early life ==
She was born in Cairo, Egypt, to an Egyptian-Armenian father and an Armenian mother. She had her secondary school education in the Armenian Gulbenkian School in Boulaq neighborhood in Cairo and continued to study Business Administration at American University in Cairo. After graduation she worked in a foreign investment company and later on in the advertising firm Tarek Nour as a singer on advertisements.

== Career ==
She took in an international song competition organized by International Federation of Festival Organizations (FIDOF) singing an original French song, lyrics by Gamal Abdel Halim Hasan and music by Kamel Cherif. Her first Egyptian public song was in a children's television program teaching Arabic language directed by Fehmi Abdel Hamid. She went on to take part in 1987 and 1988 in international festivals in Finland, Czechoslovakia, Bulgaria, Turkey, France and Latin America.

Becoming one of the most popular singers in Egypt in the 1990s, Anoushka went on to release several albums: Habbaytak (1988),Nadani (1989),Tigi Tghanni (1990),Abayyan Zayn (1992),Keddab (1994). Her last album was in 2001 and was titled Nefsy Akoon.

In Turkey, she won first prize with "Habbytak" and in the Francophonie competitions in France with her own composition "Ya Habibi (Oh my Love)" in French and "Ya Leyl (Oh Night)" also in French composed by Midhat el Khawla. She sang in the World Cup ceremonies in 1997, and the World Cup handball closing ceremony in 2000. She went on to release many albums in Arabic becoming a pan-Arab sensation and was awarded by the Egyptian Minister of Tourism for her efforts in promoting Egyptian music in the Arab world and worldwide. She also took part in many national, pan-Arab and international music events.

She had the lead role in an operetta entitled "El Ward we Fosoulu" (in Arabic "الورد وفصوله") in the Children Day festivities. She is a prolific actress, rose to fame most notably in "El-Tawous" (in Arabic "الطاووس") with the prominent movie star Salah Zulfikar in 1991. Afterwards, the prominent film director Salah Abu Seif chose her to participate in the movie "Al-Sayed Kaf" (in Arabic "السيد كاف"), then her acting works continued including "Qanoon Al-Maraghi" (in Arabic "قانون المراغي") among others.

In 2012, she was cast in the tv series Firqat Nagy Atallah which had Adel Imam playing lead role.

In 2016 Anoushka plays the criminal, evil, I-will-stop-at-nothing mother, Kesmet Hanem, in fan-favorite TV series Grand Hotel. She was considered the best villainess to hit Egypt’s TV in years due to her performance in the series. Anoushka then won the Best Actress award from the Catholic Center.

Anoushka has also been cast in other successful Ramadan dramas such as Naguib Zahy Zarkash (2021) and Rageen Ya Hawa (2022).

== Discography ==
=== Albums ===
- Habbaytak حبيتك
- Nadani ناداني
- Tigi Tghanni تيجي تغنّي
- Abayyan Zayn أبيّن زين
- Keddab كدّاب

== Filmography ==
Anoushka has also played roles in many films including:

- Es Sayyed Kaf السيد كاف, directed by the film director Salah Abu Seif
- Man Atlaqa Haazihi el Rousasa? من أطلق هذه الرصاصة
- "Hepta هبتا”
- El Hilm
- Wesh x Wesh

== TV shows ==
She has played roles in many TV Shows including:

- El Tawous الطاووس
- El Marsa wa El Bahar المرسى و البحار
- Qanoun Al Maraghi قانون المراغي
- Ferquet Nagui Atallah فرقة ناجي عطالله
- El Sayeda El Oula السيدة الاولى
- Saraya Abdeen سرايا عابدين
- Mamlakat Youssef Al Maghraby مملكة يوسف المغربي
- Grand Hotel جراند اوتيل
- Sokut Horr سقوط حر
- Halawat El Donia حلاوة الدنيا
- Naguib Zahy Zarkash
- Rageen Ya Hawa
- Life is beautiful
- Esteefa
