= Muhammad El Majzoub =

Syrian singer (born 1991)

Muhammad El Majzoub محمد المجذوب
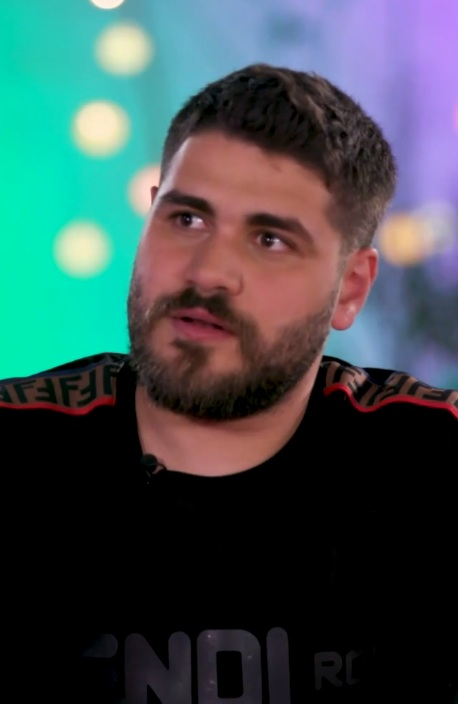
- Muhammad El Majzoub, guest of Fujairah TV, May 2019

Background information
- Born: August 15, 1991 (age 33); Latakia, Syria
- Origin: Latakia, Syria
- Genres: Arabic
- Occupation: Singer
- Years active: 2007–present

Muhammad El Majzoub (Arabic: محمد المجذوب) (born August 15, 1991) is a Syrian singer who, aged 16 in 2007, won the second series of XSeer Al Najah, (Arabic: كسير النحاح X), the Arabic version of The X Factor. He then signed with Rotana Records, which released his debut album Hann Albi (Arabic: حن قلبي) in 2008. He also worked with Al-Anoud Production.
