= The5 =

Arab pop boy band

- Origin: Beirut, Lebanon
- Genres: Pop
- Years active: 2015-2019
- Label: Sony Music
- Members: Mohamed Bouhezza (aka BMd); Kazem Chamas; Ahmed Hassan; Adil Echbiy; Said Karmouz

The5 were an Arab pop boy band composed of Kazem Chamas, Ahmed Hassan, Adil Echbiy, Said Karmouz and Mohamed Bouhezza (aka BMd). They finished third in the fourth series of the Arabic televised singing competition The X Factor Arabia in 2015.

== The X Factor Arabia ==
In 2015, Kazem Chamas, Ahmed Hassan and Adil Echbiy auditioned as solo candidates for the fourth series of the Arabic televised singing competition The X Factor Arabia, whereas Said Karmouz and Mohamed Bouhezza (aka BMd) auditioned together. They were put together to form a five-piece boy band in Beirut, Lebanon, thus qualifying for the "Groups" category. Elissa and Donia Samir Ghanem, their future mentor, have both come up with the idea of forming the band. On June 13, 2015, they competed in the finals and placed third (Groups category), losing to Hind Ziadi (Arab Solo category) and Hamza Hawsawi (International Solo category).

== After break-up ==
The band broke up in 2019.

== Discography / videos ==
- "El Donia Shabab" (5 October 2015)
- "Bil Gharam" (30 December 2015)
- "Hiyya Kidah el Hayat" (25 May 2016)
- "Ala Tabeetak Koon" (15 September 2016)
- "Nekbar Sawa" (23 August 2017)آ
- "La Bezzaf" (27 October 2017)
- "Hannini" (21 November 2017)
