= Rahbani =

Rahbani (Arabic: الرحباني) is a common Arabic surname, especially occurring in Lebanon. Notable people with the surname include:

- Rahbani brothers, the musical duo Assi Rahbani and Mansour Rahbani:
  - Assi Rahbani (1923–1986), Lebanese composer, musician and producer
  - Mansour Rahbani (1925–2009), Lebanese composer, musician, poet and producer
- Elias Rahbani (1938–2021), Lebanese producer, lyricist, composer
- Ghassan Rahbani (born 1964), Lebanese producer, lyricist, composer, arranger, orchestra conductor, pianist, and singer
- Oussama Rahbani (born 1965), Lebanese producer, lyricist, composer, arranger, orchestra conductor
- Vahid Rahbani (born 1979), Iranian actor, translator, director and playwright
- Ziad Rahbani (1956–2025), Lebanese composer, pianist, performer, playwright, and political commentator
