= Raja Kessabny =

Moroccan singer

Raja Kessabny رجاء قصابني
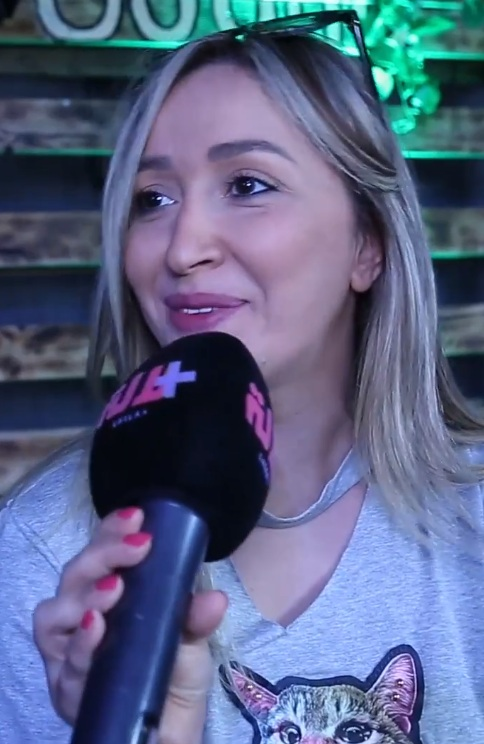
- Rajaa, June 2018

Background information
- Born: 20 March 1979 (age 47); Morocco
- Genre: Arabic
- Occupation: Singer
- Years active: 2006–present

Raja Kessabny (Arabic: رجاء قصابني, born 20 March 1979 in Morocco), or just Rajaa, is a Moroccan singer. In 2006, she won the first ever series of The X Factor, XSeer Al Najah, (Arabic: كسير النحاح X), the Arab version of The X Factor sponsored by Rotana. In the final, she beat the Egyptian rival Ahmed.

== Discography ==
=== Albums ===
- Tarabiyyat (2006) (Rotana)
- Hal al Donia (2007) (Rotana)

=== Singles ===
- Estaghrabt Ihal al Donia (2007) (Rotana)
- Moch Helwa Aachano (2008) (Rotana)
- Taala Habibi (2009) (Arabica Music)
- Illa Oumi (2010)
- Maa Ba3d (2010)
- Kassha Makssor (2011) (EMI Productions & Ishot Productions)
- Aarouss Ljamal (2011) (EMI Productions & Ishot Productions)
- Ze3ma (2015) (First PolyProductions)
- Ya Maghreb (2017) (Showi Productions)
- Ya Leila (2020) (Lifestyle Studios)
