= Fayez Al Saeed =

Emirati singer (born 1974)

Fayez Al Saeed فايز السعيد
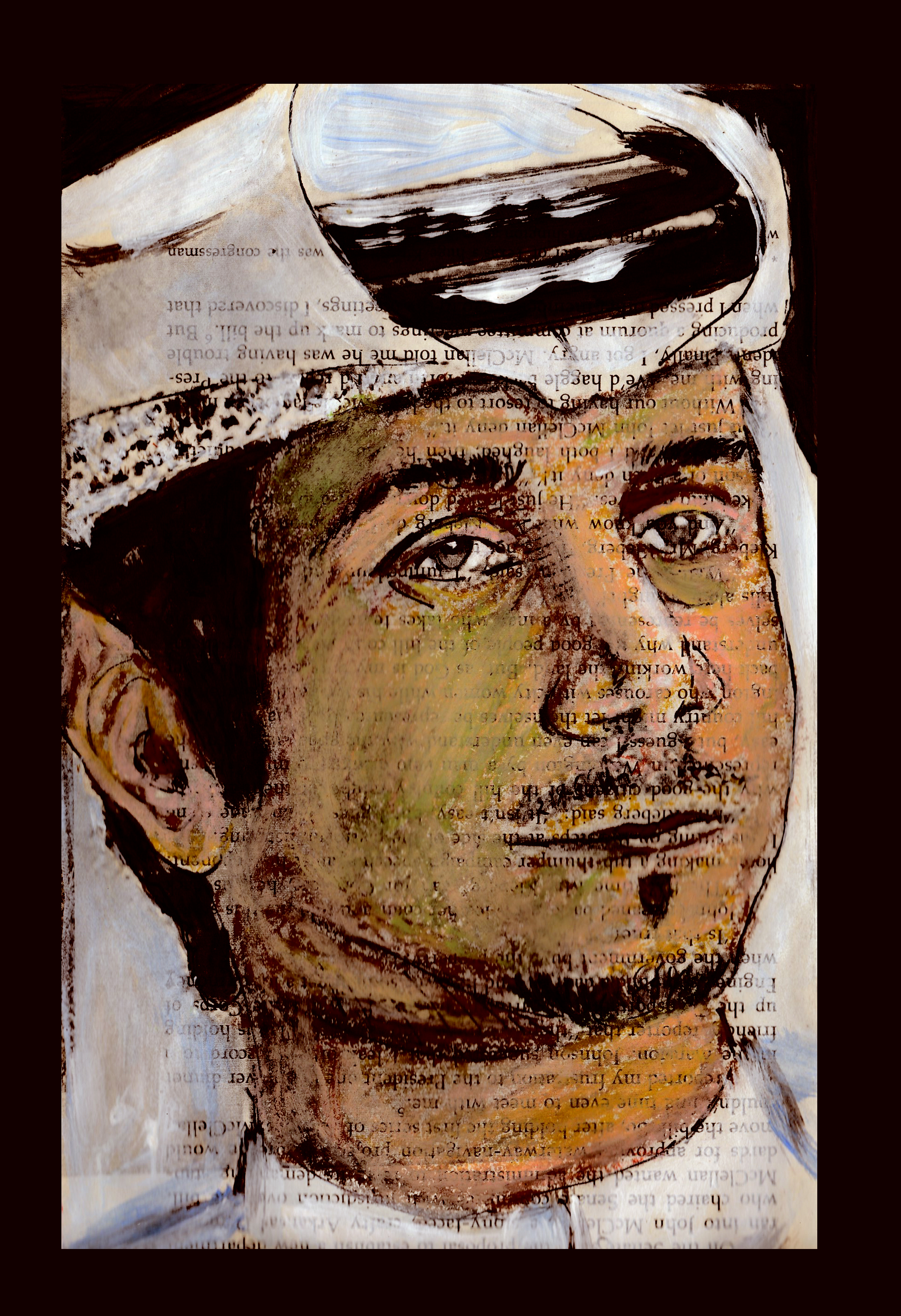

Background information
- Also known as: The Ambassador of Melodies
- Born: October 4, 1974 (age 51); Khor Fakkan, Emirate of Sharjah
- Genres: Arabic music, Khaliji
- Occupations: Singer, actor, composer
- Years active: 1996–present
- Labels: Rotana

Fayez Al Saeed (Arabic: فايز السعيد) is an Emirati producer, singer, and actor. He is known as "The Ambassador of Melodies" due to his acclaimed and innovative musical production work with various artists across the Arab World.

== Early life ==
Participated as a jury member in the Gulf Star program, which was shown on Dubai TV. He entered the composing field in 2000, beginning his first work with the artist Reem Al Mahmoudi in the song Ghayart Ra'yee (I've Changed My Mind) for her second album, Jisr El Tawasil.

== Discography ==
=== Albums ===
- Ana Weiny? (2016)
- Saroukh (2013)
- Sharid (2008)
- Mashakel (2006)
- Fayez 2003 (2003)
- Kana Kana (2002)
- Raw'aa (2002)
- Shouf Ent (2001)
- Sa'at Wa'ed (1996)

=== Festival performances ===
- Carthage Festival
- Cairo
- Fujairah
- Dubai Nights
- Agadir
- Jeddah
- Salalah
- Sharm El-Shaikh
- Beirut
- Hala February in Kuwait

=== TV Series ===
"Owner Of My Heart" as (Gamal) was his first series on TV with fellow singer Shatha Hassoun.
