= Hussain Al Jassmi =

Emirati singer and musician (born 1979)

Hussain Al Jassmi حسين الجسمي
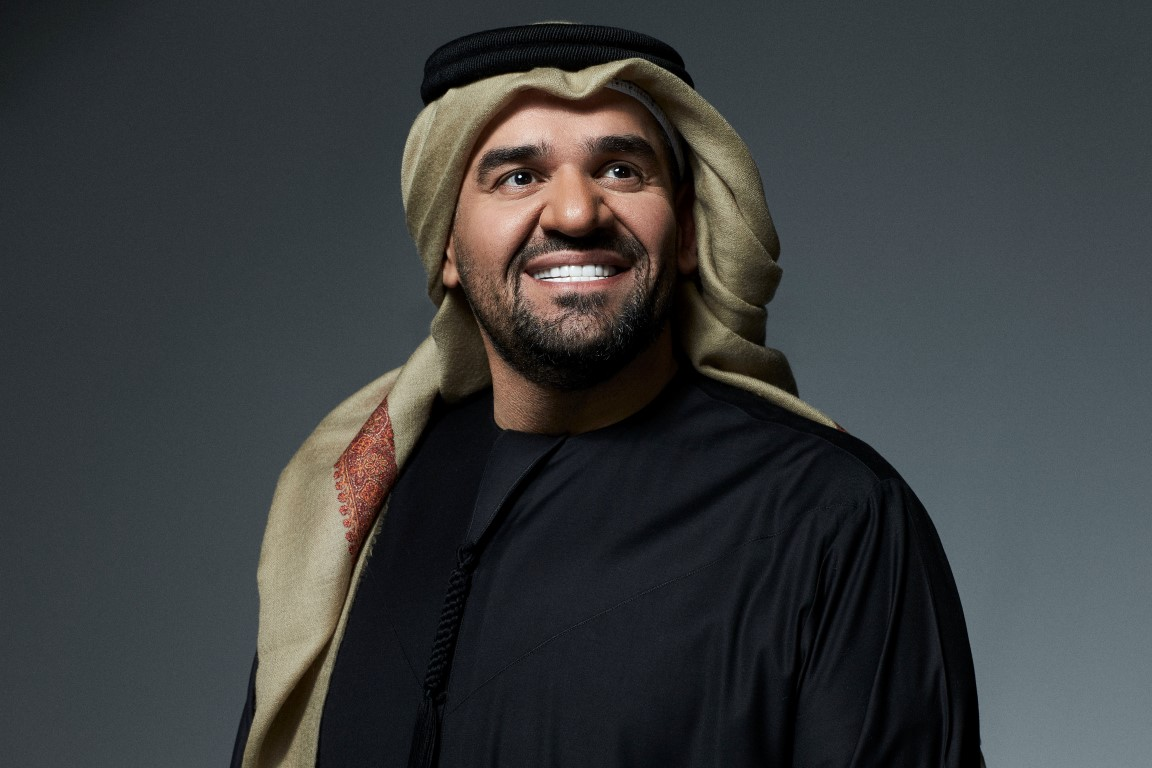
- Al Jassmi in 2014

Background information
- Born: Hussain Juma Al Jassmi; August 25, 1979 (age 47); Khorfakkan, United Arab Emirates
- Genres: Khaleeji, Egyptian, classical
- Occupations: Singer, composer
- Instruments: Piano
- Years active: 2002–present
- Website: www.hussainaljassmi.com

Hussain Al Jassmi (Arabic: حسين الجسمي; born August 25, 1979) is an Emirati singer and musician who is well known in the Arab world. Al Jassmi was born in Khorfakkan in August 1979 to an Emirati father and Egyptian mother. He released his first single "Bawada'ak" followed by "Wallah Mayiswa" and "Bassbour Al Fourgakom". In 2008, Al Jassmi received the Murex d'Or award, in the "Best Arabic Male Singer" category.

His most popular song is an Egyptian Shaabi song, called "Boshret Kheir", written and composed by Amr Mostafa as a pro-elections campaign in Egypt.

Al Jassmi has performed at many concerts all around the world. One of his well known performances was during the Vatican's annual Christmas concert, becoming the first Arab singer to perform there. He also has multiple events and concerts in the United Arab Emirates, Saudi Arabia, Kuwait, elsewhere in the Middle East and performed at the opening ceremony of Expo 2020 in Dubai, UAE as well.

Al Jassmi faced a double family tragedy in early 2025, losing his brother Jamal in November 2024 and another brother Hasan in March 2025. He announced Hasan’s death via X (Twitter), stating: “God willing, he will be buried on Sunday, March 23, 2025.

== Discography ==
Singles

- Matkhafosh Ala Masr ماتخافوش على مصر
- Boshret Kheir بشرة خير
- We Tebga Le وتبقى لي
- Abasherek ابشرك
- Morni مرني
- Faqadtak And Wallah Ma Yeswa فقدتك & والله ما يسوى
- Raak Allah رعاك الله
- Meta Meta متى متى
- Al Sirat Al Mostaqeem الصراط المستقيم
- Seta El Sobah ستة الصبح
- Ama Barawa أما براوه
- Al Jabal الجبل
- Ma Nesena ما نسينا
- Yalghalia يالغالية
- Habebi Barchaloni حبيبي برشلوني
- Sunnet El Hayah سُنة الحياة
- Right Where I'm Supposed to Be (Official Song of the Special Olympic World Games Abu Dhabi 2019) (Ryan Tedder with Avril Lavigne, Luis Fonsi, Hussain Al Jassmi, Assala Nasri and Tamer Hosny)
- Bel Bont El Areed بالبنط العريض

National Songs

- Mabrook Eidek Yal Emarat مبروك عيدك يالإمارات
- Salman Elshahamah سلمان الشهامة
- Lohat Alazzi لوحة العازي
- Ya Shabab Elwatn يا شباب الوطن
- Watani وطني
- Riyadh Alhob رياض الحب
- Al Kuwaity Ma Ynsah الكويتي ما ينسى
- Hathi Qatar هذي قطر
- Hathi Masr هذه مصر
- Agda Nas أجدع ناس
- Koolna Iraq كلنا العراق
- Reqab Elezz رقاب العز
- Rasamnalak رسمنالك
- Ya Libya Ya Jannah يا ليبيا يا جنه

Series Soundtracks

- Mahadesh Mertah محدش مرتاح
- Baad El Forak بعد الفراق

== See also ==
- Arabic music
