= Adonis (band) =

Lebanese indie band

Adonis أدونيس
- Origin: Beirut, Lebanon
- Website: adonisband.com

Adonis (Arabic: أدونيس) is a Lebanese indie band formed in 2011.

The band was founded by Anthony Khoury (vocals) and Joey Abu Jawdeh (guitar) in Beirut. It included the former's brother, Fabio Khoury (bass), and Nicola Hakim (drums). Gio Fikany (bass) joined after Fabio left and moved to Switzerland.

== Discography ==
- Daw El Baladiyyi (2011)
- Men Shou Bteshki Beirut (2013)
- Nour (2017)
- 12 Sa'a (2019)
- A'da (2021)
- Hadis El Layl (2022)
- Wedyan (2025)
