= Marwan Khoury =

Lebanese musician/singer (born 1968)

Marwan Khoury مروان خوري
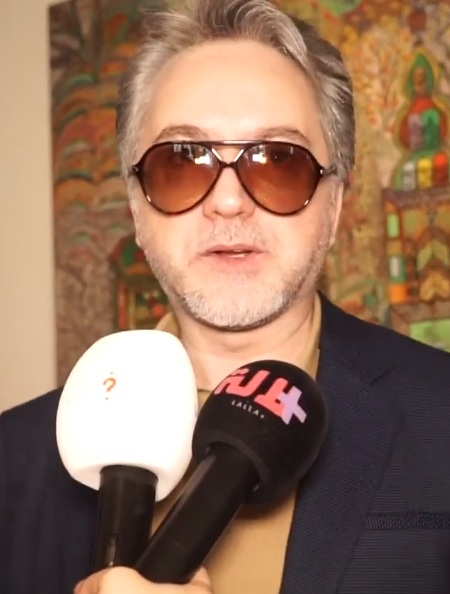
- Khoury in 2018

Background information
- Born: Marwan Tanius Camille El-Khoury مروان مطانيوس كامل الخوري; February 3, 1968 (age 58); Mazraat Al Toufah, Lebanon
- Origin: Mazra'et El Teffah, Zgharta, Lebanon
- Genres: Lebanese, Arabic, pop
- Occupations: singer, composer, writer
- Years active: 1988–present
- Spouse: Nada Rammal (m. 2023)

Marwan Khoury (Arabic: مروان خوري; born February 3, 1968) is a Lebanese singer, writer, composer and music arranger. He has composed hits for artists such as Majida El Roumi, Saber Rebaï, Nawal Al Zoghbi, Assala Nasri, Najwa Karam, Fadl Shaker, Elissa, Carole Samaha, Bassima, and Myriam Fares.

== Biography ==
Khoury was born in Mazraat Al Toufah, Zgharta District, Lebanon into a Maronite Christian family. He is the third of five children born to Tanyous and Naseema Khoury. He has two older sisters, Leena and Mona, and two younger brothers, Claude, who works as a TV director, and Dany, a music arranger. In 1986, Khoury enrolled at the Université Saint-Esprit de Kaslik (USEK) in Lebanon where he studied piano, Musicology and Music History. During his university years, he won a prize in a music composition contest. The award was presented to the singer by former Lebanese President Amin Gemayel. On his first album, Kasak Habibi (كاسك حبيبي), which was released in 1988, Khoury wrote, composed, and produced all of the songs himself.

Khoury started a new phase in his life in 1989, not as a singer but as a keyboard player and a band conductor, and appeared on TV. He continued as a keyboard player until 1996, and played with many Lebanese artists. But during that period, Khoury wrote and sang the single, "Fik Yamma Balak" (فيك ياما بالك). It was released in 1994 and established him as a singer. In 1997, he wrote, composed and performed his second single "Lasbor Ala Welah" (لأصبر على ويله). It was not until 1999 that Khoury finally became known in the music industry as a writer/composer when he released two songs for Nawal Al Zoghbi, "Tia" (تيا) and "Dalouna" (الدّلعونه). In 2001, Khoury launched his first official album, Khayal El-Omer (خيَّال العمر), and the next year, Khoury shot his first video clip "Ya Shog" (يا شوق).

Khoury has twice been awarded the Murex d'Or. He first won in 2003 and, in 2004, he was awarded the Murex d'Or for Best Multi-Talented Artist (singer, composer, music video, song and album).

In 2005, Khoury signed a five-year contract with the Rotana Records. He also released his next album, Kil Al Asayed (كل القصايد). The album and the title song were well received. It was this album that made Khoury famous in the Arab World. In 2006, Khoury released an additional album Asr El Sho (قصر الشوق). His album Ana Wl Leil was released in March 2008; on this album, the lyrics for the track "Lawla L Hawa" were written by the famous Emirati poet, Jenan. Khoury's last album with Rotana, Rajain, contained 10 tracks and was released in 2010. In January 2011, Khoury announced that his contract with Rotana had ended and that he would be moving to self-production.

Khoury has performed live at the Cairo Opera House and the Carthage Film Festival of Tunisia.

“لمين عايش؟” (Leh Meen Ayesh?): A February 2025 duet with Tunisian singer Sabir Al-Rubai, released on YouTube. The song blends Khoury’s signature romantic balladry with Al-Rubai’s vocals.

== Personal life ==
Khoury married Nada Rammal in 2023.

== Discography ==
=== Albums ===
Year	Album name (English)	Album name (Arabic)	Tracks
2002	Khayal El-Omer	خيّال العمر	6
2004	Kil Al Asayed	كل القصايد	9
2006	Asr El Sho	قصر الشوق	10
2008	Ana Wil-Lail	أنا والليل	12
2010	Rajain	راجعين	10
2013	El 'Ad el 'Aksi	العد العكسي	15

=== Singles ===
Year	Name (English)	Name (Arabic)	Notes
1988	"Kasak Habibi"	كاسك حبيبي	released with a collection album Negm we gheney
1994	"Fik Yamma Balak"	فيك يمّا بَلاك	also released with Khayal El-Omer
1997	"Lasbor Ala Welah"	لاصبر على ويله	also released with Khayal El-Omer
2007	"Ya rab"	يارب	ft. Carole Samaha; also released with Ana Wil-Lail
2007	"Dawayer"	دواير	for the movie Awqat Faragh (أوقات فراغ)
2007	"El-Arab"	ا لعرب	duet with Nehal Nabil
