= Ya Laylat al-Eid =

1940 song by Umm Kulthum

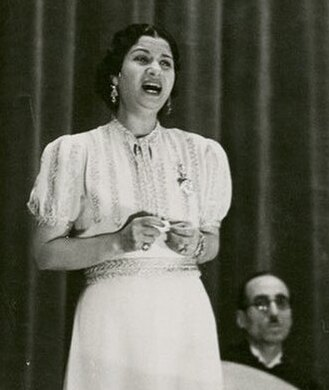
Umm Kulthum performing, 1939

"Ya Laylat al-Eid" (Egyptian Arabic: يا ليلة العيد, romanized: Ya Laylat al-ʿīd, lit. 'O Night of Eid') is a song performed by Egyptian singer Umm Kulthum. It was released as a number of the 1940 musical Dananir.

Distinguished in the popular repertoire of Arabic songs by its joyful and optimistic lyrics, it has, for decades, been an especially iconic and durable Eid song, broadcast by radio stations annually during Eid al-Fitr and Eid al-Adha across the Arab world.

== Production and release ==
The song was written by poet Ahmed Rami and composed by Riyad al-Sunbati for the 1940 Egyptian musical film Dananir, directed by Ahmed Badrakhan and starring Umm Kulthum. In the film's narrative, the final stanza praises Caliph Harun al-Rashid and his vizier Ja'far ibn Yahya.

According to an anecdote that has been circulated by newspapers, Umm Kulthum first heard a street vendor uttering the words "Yā Laylat al-ʿīd ānastinā" (transl. O Night of Eid, you've delighted us) outside Radio Cairo in 1937. Then, reportedly, poet Bayram al-Tunisi began writing lyrics starting with these words but did not complete them, and they would subsequently be completed by Rami. According to the Egyptian writer and film critic Tarek El Shennawi, this origin story is fabricated and especially improbable when it is considered that the two poets were in tense relations.

At some point following the film's release, Kulthum removed "Ya Laylat al-Eid" from the film to extricate it from the film's narrative and Abbasid setting and ensure that it becomes primarily associated with Eid itself. For radio and record release, Rami rewrote the final stanza, replacing references to the Tigris and Abbasid figures with an invocation of the Nile.

== Composition ==
The song takes the form of a taqtuqa, a short-form Arabic composition comprising verses and a chorus, often featuring female lead vocals. The melody is constructed from simple phrases moving within different Arabic maqams (melodic mode), consisting of Bayāti (similar to the minor scale) and the related Shūrī, interspersed with Rāst (the Arabic analogue of the major scale) and 'Irāq, whereas the rhythm is Wāḥda al-Kabīra, a 4-beat-based Iqa' (rhythmic mode). The chorus is echoed by a female choir. The instrumental arrangement includes the oud and a string section.

== 1944 performance and 1952 censorship ==
On 17 September 1944, during an Eid al-Fitr concert at Al Ahly SC's Mokhtar El Tetsh Stadium in Cairo, King Farouk I unexpectedly arrived while Kulthum was performing. Kulthum spontaneously altered the lyrics to insert a mention of Farouk in his honour, after which he awarded her the Order of the Virtues (then a dynastic order, usually awarded to nobility, such as queens and princesses).

After the Egyptian revolution of 1952, in which the country turned from a monarchy to a republic, broadcasts of songs praising King Farouk were briefly banned, affecting both Umm Kulthum and Mohammed Abdel Wahab, another popular singer and actor. Gamal Abdel Nasser subsequently reinstated their works on state radio, although the Farouk-specific stanza remained off air until Anwar Sadat's presidency.
