= Dananeer (film) =

- Arabic: دنانير
- Directed by: Ahmad Badrakhan
- Written by: Ahmad Rami
- Starring: Umm Kulthum; Sulayman Najib; Abbas Fares; Firdaws Hasan
- Music by: Muhammad Hasan al-Shuja'i
- Production company: El Sharq Films
- Distributed by: El Sharq Films
- Release date: 29 September 1940
- Running time: 90 minutes
- Country: Egypt
- Language: Egyptian Arabic

Dananeer (دنانير, also romanised as Dananir) is a 1940 Egyptian musical film directed by Ahmad Badrakhan, and written by Ahmad Rami. It stars Umm Kulthum in the title role of a Bedouin girl whose singing talent elevates her from the desert to the caliph's court. The historical romance is set in early 9th-century Iraq, during the reign of the fifth Abbasid caliph, Harun al-Rashid, whereas the title character is a semi-fictionalized Dananir al-Barmakiyya, qiyan musician, singer and poet.

== Plot ==
Dananeer, a Bedouin girl, is discovered singing in a desert oasis by high-ranking court official Ja'far, who brings her to Baghdad. There, she is installed as a concubine of his father Yahya, while becoming a companion of Ja'far. She studies courtly performance under the master musician Ishaq al-Mawsili, and her debut before Caliph Harun al-Rashid wins royal favour, but palace power struggles cause Ja'far to be executed. Clad in black, Dananeer withdraws to her mourning and refuses to sing for the caliph, following which she is about to be executed. Moved by her defiant gestures of devotion to her dead companion, the caliph commands the executioner to stop, declaring that she is a "symbol of loyalty".

== Cast ==
- Umm Kulthum as Dananeer
- Suleyman Naguib as Jaafar
- Abbas Faris as Harun al-Rashid
- Fouad Shafiq as Abu Nawas
- Omar Wasfi as Dananeer's Breeder
- Mansi Fahmy as Ismail bin Yahya
- Abdul Aziz Khalil as The Executioner Masrour
- Mahmoud Reda as Abdul Malik bin Saleh
- Fouad al-Rashidi as al-Fadl bin al-Rabi'
- Abdul Aziz Ahmed as Ibrahim al-Mawsili
- Fardous Hassan as Queen Zubaydah
- Yehia Chahine as Ziyad
- Serena Ibrahim as The Chief of the Concubines
- Zuzu Nabil as Concubine
- Amaal Zayed as Concubine
- Saliha Qasin as Concubine
- Hassan Kamel as Hussein al-Khalie'
- Ali Tabanjat

== Music ==
The film's score is by Muhammad Hasan al-Shuja'i. Eight musical numbers are contained, with compositions by Muhammad al-Qasabgi, Zakariya Ahmad, and Riyad al-Sunbati.

One of the numbers, "Ya Laylat al-Eid", has since become widely recognized throughout the Arab world as one of the popular "Eid songs", which are regularly performed or heard during Eid al-Fitr.

== Reception and analysis ==
Dananeer was somewhat more connected to its historical backdrop than the rest of the early historical films produced by the cinema of Egypt (Note: starting with the 1935 Shajarat al-Durr, likewise noted as an exception)—which, according to Viola Shafik, "were neither based on a literary model nor any profound knowledge of the cited epoch"—but, like them, it exhibited the characteristic use of melodrama in musicals and relied on "lavish props and costumes".

The film is noted as one of the only six film appearances of Umm Kulthum, and according to a 2012 Doha Film Institute review, she "offers some of her best musical performances in this film".

== See also ==
- Weddad (1936), another Ahmad Badrakhan musical starring Umm Kulthum as a singing slave
- Barmakids § Loss of support at the Abbasid court and execution of Jafar—varying accounts of the historical events serving as the film's narrative setting
