= Fatheya Ahmed =

Egyptian singer and actress (1898–1975)

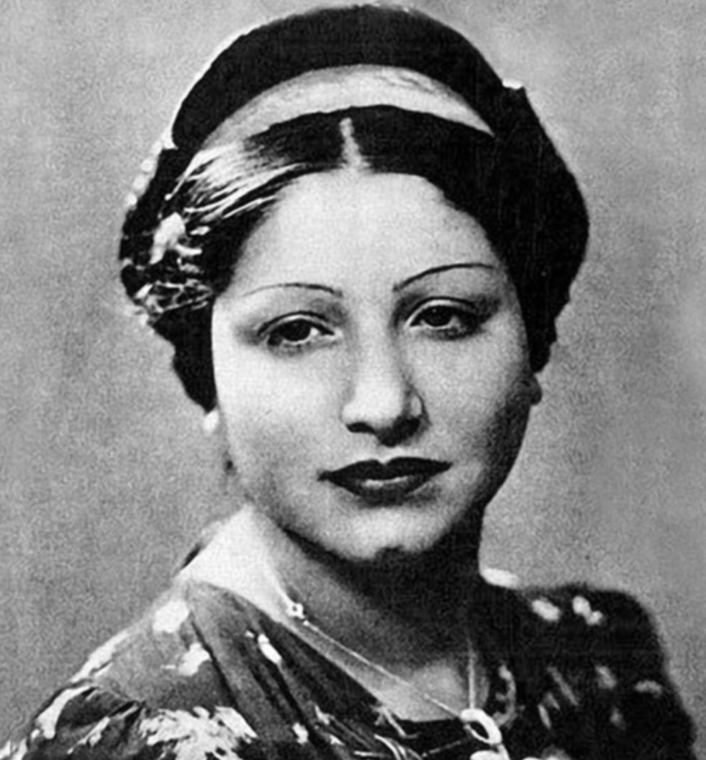
- Born: 1898; Cairo, Egypt
- Died: December 5, 1975 (aged 76–77); Cairo, Egypt
- Other names: Touha
- Occupation: singer • actress

Fatheya Ahmed (1898 – 5 December 1975), also called Touha, was an Egyptian classical singer and actress who "carried the practice of Waslah into the 20th century". She also sang many traditional and modern melodies on Takht in the tradition of awâlim in which female entertainers perform for women-only audiences during wedding celebrations. She had a “unique mastery of the mawwal”, a traditional and popular Arabic genre of vocal music.

She was known for singing poems and monologues, and sang some folk songs with Sayed Darwish, a popular Egyptian singer and composer. She sang in the 1943 film Ahlam el Shabab (1943).

== Biography ==
Fatheya Ahmed was born in a family of musicians in 1898 in the Al-Kharnafsh neighborhood in Cairo. After being introduced to music by her father, Sheikh Ahmed Al-Hamzawi, a singer and composer of classical songs, she studied singing from a number of composers including Sheikh Abu Al-Ala Muhammad, who was Umm Kulthum's first music teacher. Her two sisters, Ratiba Ahmed and Mufida Ahmed, were also singers.

In 1910, Fatheya Ahmed began her career in musical theaters and regularly performed at the theater companies of Najib al-Rihani and Amin Sidqi. From 1925, she performed at public concerts in Egypt and made numerous commercial recordings. She was equally successful on her musical tours to Syria. Because of her frequent visits to Syria with considerable success, she was named Mutribat al Qutrayn (the singer of two countries).

She sang compositions by a number of renowned Egyptian musicians, including Muhammad Othman, Abdu al-Hamuli, Zakariyya Ahmad, Mohammed Abdel Wahab, and Riad Al Sunbati. She was featured at the first issue of the Rose al-Yūsuf magazine published in 1925 along with Munîra al-Mahdiyya and Umm Kulthum. She also appeared on magazine covers in rotation with other musicians.

In 1929, she retired from the stage to raise her children. After several years, she made a comeback and regularly performed as the star singer at the musical club of Badia Masabni in Cairo. Fatheya Ahmed was a friend of Umm Kulthum for more than sixty years and performed together on numerous musical events.

She retired in the late 1940s following a chronic illness.

Fatheya Ahmed married Ismail Bey Saîd, a landowner.

Fatheya Ahmed died on 5 December 1975.
