= Umm Kulthum Museum =

Biographical museum in Cairo, Egypt

Coordinates: 30°0′26″N 31°13′31″E

Umm Kulthum Museum متحف أم كلثوم
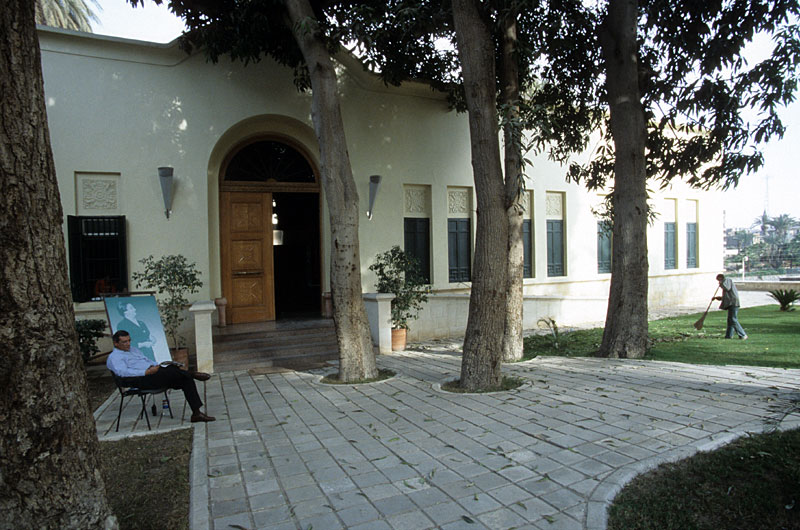
- Umm Kulthum Museum
- Established: 2001
- Location: Cairo, Egypt
- Type: Biographical museum
- Curator: Dr. Nahla Matar
- Website: www.umkalthoum.gov.eg

Om Kalthoum Museum is a biographical museum in Cairo, Egypt. The Umm Kulthum Museum is dedicated to Umm Kulthum, the iconic Egyptian singer, songwriter, and actress. Located on the Roda Island of Old Cairo, the museum was established in the Manesterli Palace, which dates from 1851.

== Overview ==
The museum is located in the Manasterly Palace, built in 1851 on a 1,000-square-meter plot in the Rawda district overlooking the Nile River in Cairo. It was established in 1998, and officially opened on 28 December 2001. The museum was established under the auspices of the Egyptian Ministry of Culture and is currently managed by the ministry's Cultural Development Fund.

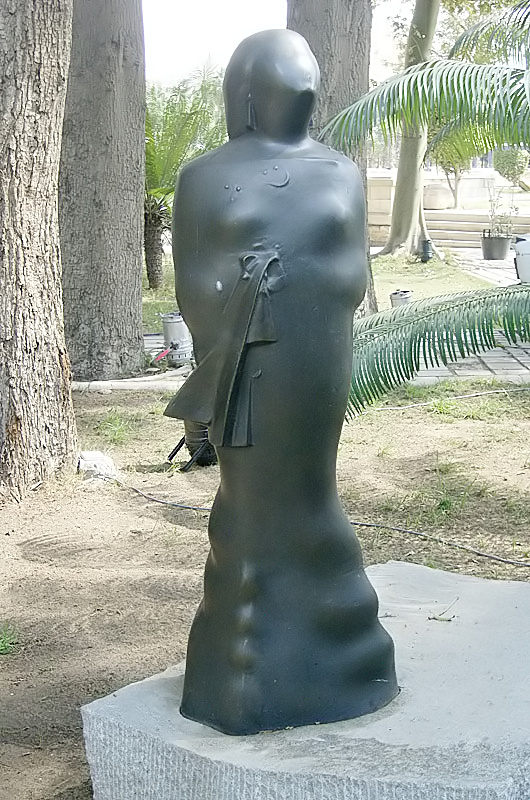
A sculpture of Umm Kulthum, by Adam Henein stands at the museum's facade.

The opening ceremony took place at the Manasterly Palace. The museum was designed and supervised by Egyptian architects. The opening was attended by a number of prominent figures in the cultural and artistic community, as the event was considered a tribute to Umm Kulthum's legacy in the world of Arabic music and song. Among those present was the Egyptian Minister of Culture, Farouk Hosny, who stated at a press conference following a tour of the museum, which was also attended by members of Umm Kulthum's family, that the ministry considers the establishment of this museum an encouragement for Egyptian artists. The Egyptian Ministry of Culture decided to award an annual prize in the name of Umm Kulthum for the most beautiful Egyptian voice.

== Collection ==
The museum houses a rare collection of Umm Kulthum's personal and artistic belongings, including:

- The clothes and accessories she wore in her concerts, such as her diamond-encrusted glasses and her famous handkerchief.
- The oud she used in her concerts.
- The medals and decorations she received, such as the Order of the Nile and the Order of the Cedar from Lebanon.
- Documents and manuscripts, including poems handwritten by poets such as Ahmed Rami and Bayram al-Tunisi.
- Antique musical instruments, such as the gramophone and radio, which she used to record her songs. An audio-visual music library containing audio and video recordings of all her concerts and songs.
- Films in which she participated, such as Dananeer (1940) and Fatima (1947).
- A press archive containing more than 7,000 articles and news reports about her life and work.

The museum includes a cinema hall that presents a short documentary about Umm Kulthum's life and career, including scenes from her films, concerts in Egypt and the Arab world, and her funeral. The documentary is available in Arabic, English, and French.

== Activities and events ==
- The museum organizes regular cultural and artistic events, such as:
- Concerts held on the first Thursday of each month, where artists from Egypt, Africa and the Arab world perform Umm Kulthum's songs.
- Cultural and academic seminars on Umm Kulthum's influence on Egyptian music.
- Workshops and competitions for young people interested in singing and music.
- Temporary exhibitions highlighting different aspects of Umm Kulthum's life.

== Significance ==
The Umm Kulthum Museum is considered an important cultural center for preserving Egyptian artistic heritage, as it allows visitors to learn about the life and work of the "Lady of Egyptian Song" through her original possessions. The museum is also an academic resource for researchers and students in the fields of music and the arts.

== See also ==
- Egyptian culture
- List of museums in Egypt
