= Al-Atlal =

Poem by Ibrahim Nagi

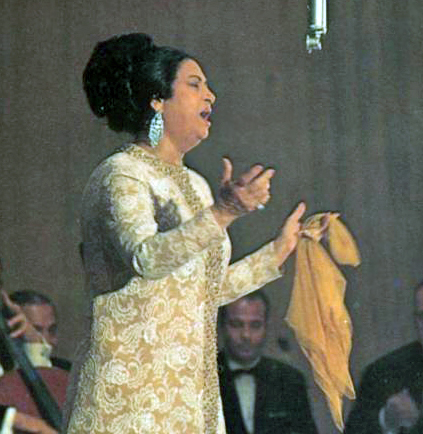
Umm Kulthum

Al-Atlal (Arabic: الأطلال, "The Ruins") is a poem written by the Egyptian poet Ibrahim Nagi, which later became a famous song sung by Egyptian singer Umm Kulthum in 1966. The song's lyrics were adapted by Umm Kulthum and the melody was composed by the Egyptian composer Riad Al Sunbati. Two years earlier, the singer had performed her first song composed by Mohamed Abdel Wahab, titled Inta Omri (إنت عمري, "You are My Life"). Both of these songs became very successful.

== The poem ==
The words of the song in classical Arabic were adapted from two poems by Ibrahim Nagi, meaning that the lyrics of the song are not exactly the same words of the poem. The second poem is named Al-Wadaa (الوداع - The Parting). Further, the song was recorded 13 years after the poet's death. It was first published in 1944 in a compilation known as the Layali al-Qahira (Cairo Nights) and is inspired by the qasida, a pre-Islamic Arabic form of poetry.

The poem follows a tripartite thematic structure that can be read as a romantic narrative. In the first movement, the lyrical subject, standing amid the ruins of a deserted encampment, reflects on a past love, evoking traces of the beloved near the cold ashes of a campfire. The second section depicts a journey through the desert, interweaving meditations on loss and betrayal with the practical frustrations of travel, such as rebuking an ill-tempered camel. In the final part, arrival at a new encampment occasions an offering of a newly composed poem and personal loyalty to the local chief, symbolizing a reconciliatory acceptance of destiny or divine will. A few lines of the lyrics in English translation read as follows:

You my heart do not ask where love has gone. It was a mirage that dispersed.
Water me and let me sing on its ruins as long as tears are running.

— Al Atlal - The Ruins

== The melody ==
The melody was composed in the 1960s by Riad al-Sunbati. He was one of the most prominent composers in 20th-century Arabic music in general and specifically with regard to Umm Kulthum. Riad al-Sunbati's composition exemplifies a distinct mode of reinterpretation, adopting the structure of the al-ughiyya or al-ughiniyya al-ṭawīla ("long song"), often understood as a modern counterpart to the ṭarab waṣla—a traditional suite of vocal and instrumental pieces designed to achieve heightened emotional impact, called tarab in Arabic.

== Reception ==
Al-Atlal became popular in the late 1960s when Umm Kulthum began to sing it. Both the lyrics and the music refer to interrelated patterns of emulation and adaptation, obscuring any fixed association with a single cultural or geographical context, thereby posing questions of origin. The lyrics “Grant me my freedom, release my hand. I gave you everything and I held nothing back!” have been interpreted as a political statement. This passage describes a section of the performance that typically elicited fervent applause. According to a 2010 study of Umm Kulthum's artistic agency and emergence as an "Arab legend", this passage was often interpreted less as the spurned lover's plea to loosen the bonds to an unworthy beloved, and more as an allusion to political liberation—specifically, the freeing of the hands of the dispossessed Palestinians, stripped of territory and dignity. Since the Six Day War between Israel and several Arab countries, the song has been considered as "one of the most iconic songs from her repertoire."

== See also ==
- List of best-selling singles by country
