= Mohamed El Qasabgi =

Egyptian musician and composer (1892–1966)

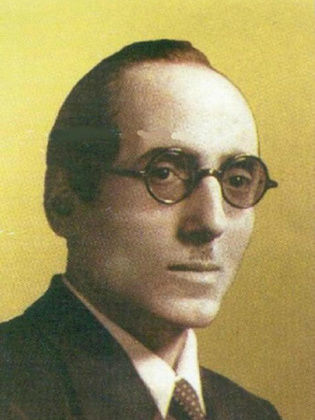
- Mohamed El Qasabgi

Background information
- Born: April 15, 1892; Cairo, Khedivate of Egypt, Ottoman Empire
- Died: March 25, 1966 (aged 73) Cairo, United Arab Republic
- Genres: Egyptian music, tarab
- Occupation: Composer
- Instrument: Oud
- Years active: 1917–1966

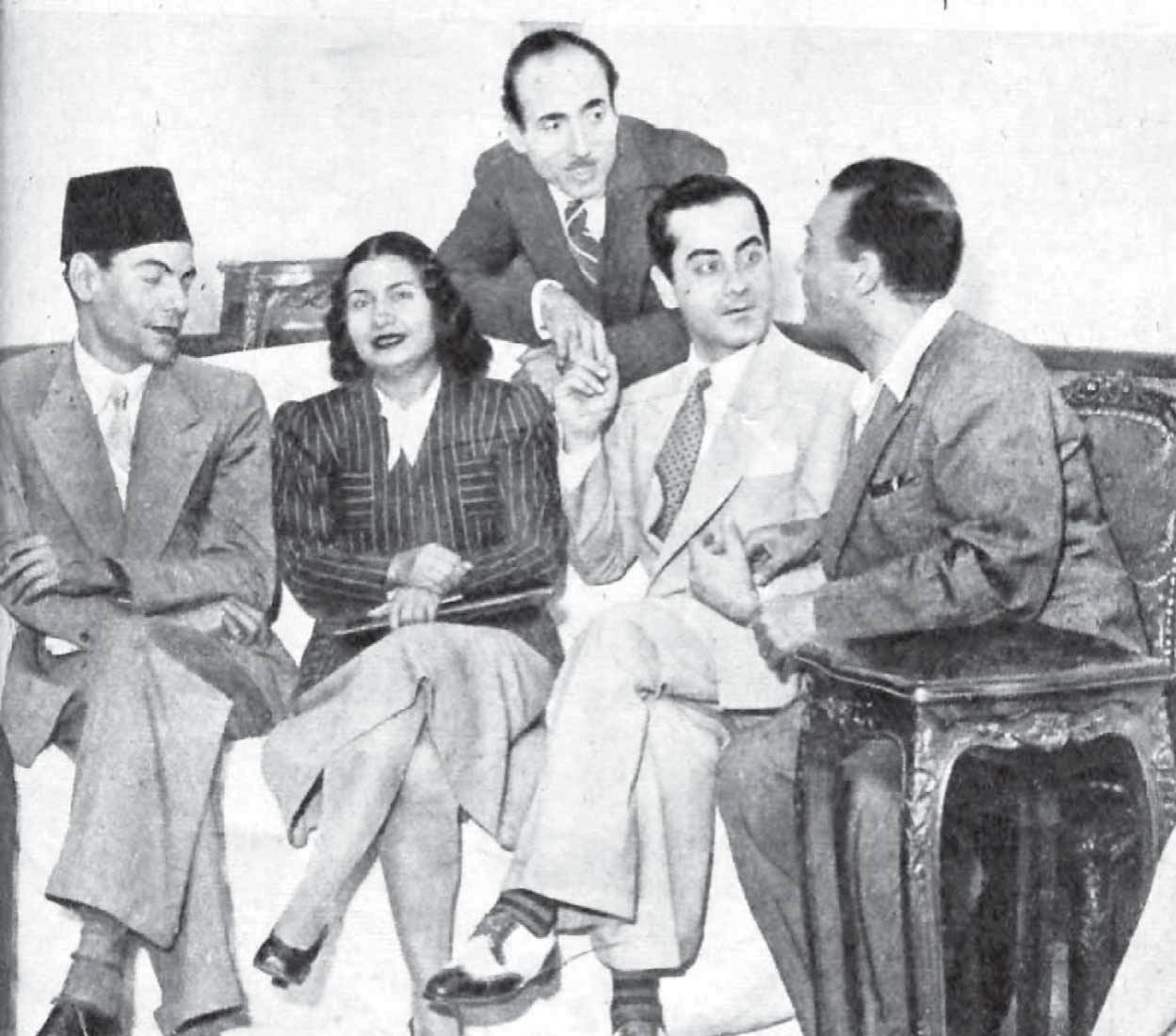
From left to right: Riad Al Sunbati, Umm Kulthum, Mohamed El Qasabgi, Farid al-Atrash, Zakariyya Ahmad.

Mohamed el-Qasabgi or el-Asabgi (Arabic: محمد القصبجي; 15 April 1892 – 25 March 1966) was an Egyptian musician and composer, regarded as one of the leading Egyptian composers in the 20th century. Most of his credits went to Umm Kulthum, Asmahan, and Layla Murad who sang most of his great works and scores. Until today, most critics classify Mohamed El Qasabgi as the master of the oud due to his great abilities and skills which he had during his time.

In most of his tunes, there is a real sensation of the pure Oriental spirit, mixed with European musical techniques and taste. This was mostly seen in songs like Ya Toyour, Raa' El Habeeb, Ana Albi Daleeli.

In the above-mentioned songs and many others, he was widely recognized by most musicians and critics at that time as the leader of development of Oriental music, and mixing it with newest musical techniques and influences brought in from Western classical traditions of his time.

== Important dates ==
- 1892 Birth of El Qasabgi.
- 1917 Actual journey begins.
- 1920 Mohamed El Qasabgi composes songs for great singers of that time, including the legendary Mounira El Mahdeya.
- 1920 through 1923 The legendary Mohammed Abdel Wahab learns the lute at the hands of Qasabgi.
- 1924 Umm Kulthum sings his music for the first time. In the same year, he forms his own Oriental musical band which included great musicians.
- 1927 Mohamed El Qasabgi composes the monolog In Kuntu Asamih performed by Umm Kulthum. This song creates a revolution in the taste of Oriental music.
- 1933 Asmahan sings his music for the first time.
- 1930s Mohamed El Qasabgi is Umm Kulthum's favorite composer.
- 1941 He composes for Umm Kulthum what most critics recognise as his all-time great piece under the name of Raa' El Habeeb.
- 1942 He composes the first real Egyptian opera, and is assisted by Riyadh El Sonbati, another great legend.
- 1948 He composes the last song for Umm Kulthum, after which he nearly quits composing until the year of his death, yet stays a leading figure in the music band of all Umm Kulthum's nights and songs until his death in 1966.
- 1960 Wins the Science and Art Distinction by then Egyptian president Gamal Abdel Nasser

== Notable works ==
Actually the following works which were composed by Mohamed El Qasabgi are considered to be essential classics, and must have musical masterpieces where he kept the sense of pure Oriental music with the newest foreign Western musical techniques. With these songs and many others, he is recognized by most of his fellow musicians, including Umm Kulthum, Zakariyya Ahmad, and Mohammed Abdel Wahab, as being the master of the new music spirit. And below is a list of some of his famous works

- In Kuntu Asamih 1927
- Enti Fakrani 1931
- Leih Telawe'eni 1932
- Ayyuhal Fulk (Oh Ship...) 1934
- Fein El Oyoun 1934
- Songs of 'Widad' movie 1935
- Songs of 'Nasheed El Amal' movie 1937
- Madam Teheb 1940
- Asqiniha 1940
- Ya Tuyoor 1941
- Raa' El Habeeb 1941
- Opera Aida - Composed by Mohamed El Qasabji and Riyadh El Sonbati 1942
- Hal Tayyam Al Ban 1942
- Emta Ha Te'raf 1944
- Ana Elli Astahel 1944
- Ana Albi Daleeli 1948

== Legacy ==
Following his death, began the practice Umm Kulthum's practice of leaving El Qasabgi's chair vacant on stage, with his oud placed upside down upon it, as a tribute to his contributions to Arabic music.
