= Sono Cairo =

Egyptian Multimedia company

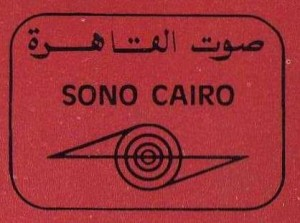
- Native name: Sout Alqahira
- Type: Public corporation
- Industry: Mass media
- Genre: Government Company
- Predecessor: ERTU
- Founded: 6 January 1964
- Founder: Mohamed Fawzi & CO
- Headquarters: Cairo Governorate, Egypt
- Number of locations: 51 Sabel Al Khazndara, Al Waili, Cairo Governorate
- Area served: Worldwide
- Key people: Mohamed Fawzi, Taha Nasr
- Products: Broadcasting, radio, web portals
- Services: Television, radio, online
- Owner: Government of Egypt (Publicly owned)
- Website: www.sonocairo.com

Sono Cairo (Sout Alqahira, Sout Al Qahira, or Sawt al-Qahira: Arabic: شركة صوت القاهرة للصوتيات والمرئيات, "the sound of Cairo") is an Egyptian government owned multimedia company.

== Company history ==
Launched as a privately owned record company, it was taken over by the government in 1964, and became Egypt's largest producer of phonograph records (LPs and 45s). As of 2009 it is under the control of the Ministry of Information.

Artist Mohamed Fawzi & Co established a factory for phonograph records on 30 April 1959 and turned into sout Alqahira (Voice of Cairo) Company for records on 6 January 1964. Then issued its decision, Mr. / Minister of Information No. 139 of 1977 established the sout alqahira company for audio and video (Sono Cairo Audio & Video Co.) as an Egyptian joint stock company, as a unit of the Radio and Television Union of the Ministry of Information.

In the Egyptian Revolution of 1952, Egyptian president Anwar Sadat made a speech from the company's broadcast.

== Former Chairmen ==
No.	Name	From	To
1	Taha Mohammed EL-Hady Nasr	6 January 1964	21 November 1979
2	Safwat Ali Fahmy	22 November 1979	31 December 1980
3	Fathy EL-Bayumy Ebrahim	1 January 1981	10 March 1982
4	Mohammed Reda Hashem	11 March 1982	22 January 1983
5	Ahmed Mohammed EL-Fetory	23 January 1983	16 July 1986
6	Mohamed Saed Sabry	1 September 1986	10 January 1990
7	Abdel Aal Mohamed Abdel Aal	14 January 1990	20 November 1994
8	Abd EL-Rahman Ebrahem Hafez	21 November 1994	20 May 1997
9	Husien Fahmy Galal EL-Deen	26 May 1997	9 October 1999
10	Medhat Ahmed Abd EL-Menaem	10 October 1999	4 June 2000
11	Hosny Hamed EL-Rahamawy	5 June 2000	5 September 2003
12	Saed Helmy EL-Saed Yehya	6 September 2003	26 November 2005
13	Ebrahem Ahmed Ebrahem EL-Akabawy	28 November 2005	5 January 2011

== Video production ==
Sono Cairo's production includes production of religious E.g. (Mohamed rasol Allah) And entertainment (music and songs) sono Cairo company Is interested in the field of video production to produce work of dramatic serials (such as gomhoreit zefta, elsharae algeded, elwatad) and other serials.

== Singing production ==
The company seeks to preserve the heritage of songs the good times, where it converted tapes to the electronic media in preparation to launch in the market as digital image CD & DVD & MP3.

== Religious production ==
The company produces the Koran.

== Stars who have worked with Sono Cairo ==
- Umm Kulthum
- Mohammed Abdel Wahab
- Abdul Basit Abdus Samad
- Muhammad Metwally Al Shaarawy
- Fairuz

== External marketing ==
There are fourteen companies holding the rights to distribute and print production of sout alqahira at the international level, distributed as follows:

=== The Persian Gulf region and Arab countries ===
- Institution of sout aljazera (Saudi Arabia)
- Al-khaleg factory (Saudi Arabia)
- Dar alwasela (Saudi Arabia)
- Almostakbal company (Kuwait)
- Institution of 13- June (Yemen)
- Dan we Dan company (Kuwait)
- Music box (Dubai)
- Feras and basem company (Jordan – Palestine)
- Institution of Ghazawi (Oman, United Arab Emirates)
- Recordings of albeshry (Sharjah, UAE)

=== The Maghreb region ===
- Vasifun (Morocco)

=== Africa region ===
- Almasaa international for production and advertising (Sudan)

=== Europe Region ===
- Platinum

=== Region of the United States and Canada ===
- Mike's Sound Production (U.S. and Canada)

=== E-Marketing ===
- To cope with the company has developed e marketing activity to use the modern techniques to market content using the international information network and voice services through mobile and ground and affixed to marketing Internet connections to sono Cairo customers and the e-marketing copying Self-electronic media (CD) & (DVD) & (MP3)

== Editing and graphics ==
A continuation of the bidding company and despite the fire which broke out in units of editing, graphics The company has created a new center for editing and graphics to keep pace with development in the field of video production and the center houses became include:

- No. (5) Units of Nonlinear Editing
- No. (1) Units of linear Editing
- No. (1) Units integrated graphics

== Studios ==
Studio (4) was created in area 200 m on the ground floor In addition to the three studios Company; this is to increase production through the use of visual studio company

- Abbasid studio (1)
- Abbasid studio (2)
- ElGib studio (3)
- New Abbasid studio (4)
- El Sayeda Nafeesa studio (5)

== Factories ==
The company has two factories to produce and print cassette voice in Alexandria production capacity up to more than 3 million Cassettes per one shift annually for the production and printing of the Koran bars for famous readers and religious talk, entertainment and musical.

== Press ==
- Printed packaging tapes and CD covers of 4-color offset printing.
- Printed posters, artists and readers of the Quran 4 color.
- Implementation and printed posters advertising (the results of a wall - the results of hierarchical - Results photographer).
- Implementation of trade publications, which include the company's publications and others from books and magazines and so on.
- Processing of paper photography for all sizes of company and others.

== Advertising agency ==
The advertising agency represents one of the major activity in the company which offer integrated advertising services in this regard where it propagate the clients' advertisement in the radio, TV, and Satellite.
