= Riad Al Sunbati =

Egyptian composer and musician (1906–1981)

Riad Al Sunbati رياض محمد السنباطي
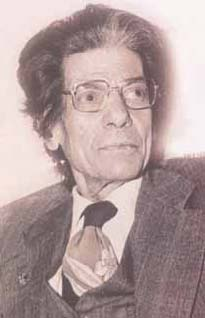

Background information
- Also known as: The Prince of Melody, The Bulbul of Mansoura
- Born: Riad Mohammed Al Sunbati; 30 November 1906; Faraskur, Damietta Governorate, Egypt
- Origin: Faraskur, Damietta Governorate, Egypt
- Died: 10 September 1981 (aged 74) Egypt
- Genres: Egyptian
- Occupation: musician
- Instrument: Oud
- Years active: 1928–1970s

Riad Mohamed El Sunbati (Arabic: رياض محمد السنباطي), also written as Riad Sonbati or Riadh Sonbati (30 November 1906 – 10 September 1981) was a 20th-century Egyptian composer and musician who was considered an icon of Egyptian Music. He composed 539 works for the Egyptian Opera, operettas and Egyptian cinema. He also composed religious music and wrote lyrics for Arab singers, among them Umm Kulthum, Fairouz, Asmahan, Warda Al-Jazairia, Najat Al Saghira, Mounira El Mahdeya, Fayza Ahmed, Saleh Abdel Hai, and Aziza Galal.

== Biography ==
Sunbati was the first born son after eight girls. The family was from Faraskur, Damietta Governorate, Egypt. His father was a singer who performed at mawlids, weddings and religious holidays in the nearby villages and towns. As a youngster, his father caught him playing the oud and singing Sayed Darwish instead of going to school. The father began to take him along as a wedding singer. When the family moved to Mansoura, Dakahlia, Riad was placed in a kuttab school.

When Sunbati was nine he was diagnosed with an eye disease that made it hard for him to read but his talent for music was obvious. He went on to become the lead singer of a band, earning the nickname Bulbul al-Mansoura بلبل المنصورة (The nightingale of Mansour).

Sayed Darwish invited him to Alexandria but Sunbati's father refused. In his early years, he recorded several instrumental Oud improvisations for the German label Odeon Records.

=== Musical career ===
In 1928, Sunbati the father moved to Cairo with Riad, thinking that Riad deserved to prove himself in the artistic life, just like Umm Kulthum whose father was friend to Riad's father before moving to Cairo. In this year, Sunbati began a new stage in his life, he registered at the Arab Music Institute, and was appointed as a teacher for playing the oud and singing. From here, his fame grew, and his name began to appear in the celebrations of the institute as a skilled player. However, he stayed for only three years, after which he quit and decided to enter the world of composing. His first composition was a poem of Ahmed Shawqi which was composed and sung later by Mohammed Abdel Wahab (Maqadeer men Jafnayky), he also worked as an oudist and a vocalist in Mohamed abdelwahab's takht (ensemble) where he appears in his song ElNile Nagachi in the movie Alwarda AlBeyda. In the early 1930s, he started working with Audion records, a major egyptian recording studio where he recorded various taqsims of his own. Audion (أوديون) company introduced him as a composer for its famous singers like: Saleh Abdel Hai, Abdel-Ghani Al Sayed, Rajaa Abdo and Najat Ali. In 1979, Riad Al Sunbati received the prestigious UNESCO International Music Prize as a performer of the Oud becoming the first person from the middle east and the only Egyptian to receive that award. He was also known for his unique and original taqsims which are famous for being the most authentic Arabic taqsims of that periods which are widely used as a model of maqam music in middle-eastern music schools, a collection of his taqsims on major Arabic maqams was recorded later in his career. One of his most famous instrumental compositions is "longa riad" (also known as "longa sultani yigah") which is considered to be the most famous Arabic longa which was played by many western and Turkish orchestras and oudists.

== Relation to Umm Kulthum ==
In the middle of the 1930s, Umm Kulthum became more and more famous across the Egyptian countryside and therefore Riad was looking forward to meeting her. Their first meeting occurred by chance at a train station. Riad Al Sunbati composed for Umm Kulthum for the first time, in the song Ala Balad El-Mahboub على بلد المحبوب (To the Country of the Beloved) in 1935 for her movie Wedad, and although Umm Kulthum refused to sing the song in the film she recorded it after the great success of the song. Her recording in turn which was a huge success. As a result, he then joined her artistic team, which included Mohamed El Qasabgi and Zakariyya Ahmad becoming her youngest composer at that time. He worked with Umm Kulthum in many of their songs for her films such as "ifrah ya Aalbi" إفرح يا قلبي which was considered to be the song where he developed his unique style. He composed over 200 songs for her, more than any other composer had. At the same time he composed Arab poems, which almost all other composers failed to do, so he deserved the name he was given from Umm Kulthum 'The Genius'. He was also one of the only composers whom Umm Kulthum highly respected his opinions and agreed to all his remarks and compositions.

He composed many classical master pieces for Umm Kulthum such as Robaa'eyat El Khayyam, the highly appreciated Persian poem of Omar Khayyam which was translated by Ahmed Rami to Arabic. He also composed many religious songs becoming the best composer of religious songs as Mohammed Abdel Wahab described him. One of his most known songs is "Zikrayat" whose overture is considered to be one of the longest in Arabic music and even longer than Abdelwahab's Inta Omri. Riad Al Sunbati used to record most of his compositions for Umm Kulthum in his own voice on separate discs as his first musical career has been singing

=== Al-Atlal ===
The song Al-Atlal الأطلال (The Ruins) is one of the Arab music classics. Many critics considered it 'The Crown of the Arab Song' and the best 20th century Arab song. It is considered by many the best of what Umm Kulthum sang, and the best of what Sunbati composed. Umm Kulthum sang Al-Atlal in 1966 after two years from Mohammed Abdel Wahab's first song to Umm Kulthum, Inta Omri إنت عمري (You are My Life), and it had the same huge success.

== Acting career ==
1952 was the start of Sunbati's acting career when he took the leading role with Huda Sultan in the film "Habeeb Alby" (The love of my heart) becoming his first and last experience as an actor. He later refused other roles as an actor as he preferred his job as a composer as he believed "Acting was not his thing". He also wrote the musical score for the film as well as the song "Fadel Youmeen" (Two days left) he performed in the film.

== Discography ==
=== Compositions for Other Artists ===
Most notable compositions for Umm Kulthum include:

- Al-Atlal (the ruins)
- Robayyeat al-khayyam (quatrains of Omar Khayyam)
- A'ala Balad el-mahboob (to the country of the beloved)
- Ifrah ya Alby
- Ya lelet el-eid
- Zikrayat
- Yally Kan yeshgeek aneeny
- Lessa Faker
- Hasibak Lil-Zaman حسيبك للزمن
- Hayyart Albi ma'ak
- Awidt E'iny
- El-qalb ye'eshaq kol Gameel
- Men agl Aynayk
- Hadeeth Alrooh
- Thawrat Al-shak
- Arooh le meen
- Arak A'asy al-Dama'
- Al-Thulatheya al-Muqadasa
- Nahj al-Borda

=== Songs performed by Riad Al Sunbati ===
- Ashwaq
- Ilah alkoon
- Raby sobhanak dawman

Compositions:

- Longa Farahfaza (longa Riad)
- Shanghai Dance

=== Film scores ===
- 1949: Al lailu lana

== See also ==
- Al-Atlal
- Arab music
- Umm Kulthum
