= Dawood Hosni =

Egyptian composer

- Born: February 26, 1870
- Died: December 10, 1937 (aged 67)
- Citizenship: Egypt
- Occupations: Singer; Composer

Dawood Hosni (born David Haim Levi, 26 February 1870 – 10 December 1937) was an Egyptian music composer.

== Biography ==
Dawood's father, Khidr Hossnei, was a jeweler. Dawood's family were Karaite Jews. Dawood was apprenticed to a bookbinder, Sukkar Bookshop, at the age of ten; a customer, Sheikh Mohammed Abdu, encouraged him to study music and singing. His father did not want him to become a musician but he travelled to Mansoura, where he studied under the composer Mohammed Sahabaari. He learned composition and oud, and when he returned to Cairo, sang the compositions of Sheikh Mohammad Abdelrahim (known as El-Masloub). At the age of twenty, he composed in the forms of adwar, taqtuqa, and qasida, imitating the singing style of Mohammed Uthman. In 1932, he was selected to record the works of Mohammed Uthman.

He was also the composer of the first Egyptian opera, "Shamshoon and Delilah".

Hosni composed ensembles for many theatrical musicals for Ukasha, Muneera al-Mahdia, Naguib al-Rihani, Ali al-Kassar, and Muhammed Bahgat, such as "Marouf al-Askafee", "Sabah", "al Brensissah", "al Layalee al Milah", and "al Ghandoura". He was also a teacher to Umm Kulthum and Amal al-Atrash whom he called "Asmahan".

Hussnei's first wife, Qamar ('Moon') died young. It is possible he composed the song 'Qamar al Layli' ('Moon of Many Nights'in the maqam rast) in her honor. He married a second time, in 1920 and had two children, neither of whom became professional musicians. The last professional work Hussnei did was for a musical program for the National Radio Station. He died in 1937.

His son, Yitzhak HaLevi (Abu Badia) made Aliyah to Israel, and in December 1977 participated in the peace talks between Israel and Egypt that were held at the Mena House in Egypt

== See also ==
- list of Egyptians
