= Elhadi Adam =

Sudanese poet and songwriter (1927–2006)

- Born: Al-Hadi Adam Al-Hadi; 1927; El-Helalelih village, Sudan
- Died: 30 November 2006 (aged 78–79) Sudan
- Genres: Sudanese literature
- Occupation: high school teacher

Elhadi Adam Elhadi (Arabic: الهادي آدم الهادي), or Elhadi Adam Elhadi (1927 – 30 November 2006), was a Sudanese poet and songwriter most famously known for writing "Aghadan alqak" famously sung by Om Kalthoum.

== Life & Career ==
Born in El-Helaleliha City, Al Jazirah state in central Sudan on the bank of the Blue Nile, Adam continued his later studies at the Scientific Institute (now Omdurman Islamic University) in Omdurman and afterwards worked for several Sudanese newspapers.

He received a scholarship to complete his education in Egypt in Dar Al-Eloom (the House of Science) in Cairo. Further, he obtained a diploma in Education and Psychology from Ain Shams University in Cairo and then returned to Sudan to work as a teacher in several Sudanese towns. One of his poems, called El-Helalelih became part of the curriculum in intermediate schools. The poem talks about his hometown, El-Helalelih village, and how he is suffering from nostalgia for his village.

Elhadi Adam rose to prominence in Sudan and the Arabic speaking world when his poem Aghadan Algak (Is it tomorrow we shall meet?) was sung by the renowned Egyptian singer Umm Kulthum. The poem was selected by Umm Kulthum among tens of poems offered to her during her visit to Sudan in 1968. Because of the death of Egyptian president Gamal Abdel Nasser, she only sung the lyrics written by Elhadi and set to music by Egyptian composer Mohammed Abdel Wahab in May 1971 in the cinema Gisr en-Nīl.

Elhadi Adam is considered by critics as one of the greatest poets in the Arabic speaking world. Even though he belonged to the old school of poets, he is still considered contemporary.

Elhadi Adam was a prolific writer and wrote several collections of poems. The most well known of his work is Koukh Al-Ashwag (كوخ الاشواق) from the mid-1960s. He wrote in several literary genres, for example a play named Suad that speaks against early marriage. Critics and history scholars in Sudan believe he is one of those who contributed toward the development of poetry, through the arts association, which he supervised in the schools he worked in throughout Sudan. He wrote two other poetry collections, titled Nowafez Al`adam (نوافذ العدم) and Affoan Ayohha Al-mostaheel (عفوا أيهاالمستحيل).

== Sample of his poem translated to English ==
- I Won't Pass Away

What would happen
had my life ended.
And my heart beat stopped.
With my soul flying.
Throughout the sky as an eagle.
Do you think life would keep up noisy.
And –as I used to know- with its system perfectly running.
Or a disaster would hit the globeAnd take it away for a while?!
Nothing, but it will be full.
Of pleasures and all forms of temptation.
Many will go on playing.
Awaiting the emergence of dawn.
Loudly repeating the melody.
Telling the flowers about the morning.
And a true brother of mine.
Keep remembering me
Maintaining our old friendship.
I know what will be said tomorrow.
And I will ridicule it from within my grave.
They will say –when I die- passed away
Made the (president) contented, and bestowed his life!
