= Taqtuqa =

Genre of Arabic vocal music

A taqtūqa (Arabic: طـقطـوقـة plural: taqātīq, طـقـاطـيـق) is a genre of light Arabic vocal music sung in regional or colloquial Arabic. It was associated with female vocalists around the turn of the 20th century and became very popular during the first decades of the 20th century, as the gramophone and cinema grew in popularity. It has been considered as a predecessor of the modern Arabic song (ughniya) and was first reserved for female audiences and later adopted also for male singers. Written in a clear structure of verses and a chorus, it is easy to remember. Hence his vogue from the 1920s.

Egyptian singers Mounira El Mahdiya and Umm Kulthum recorded taqtuqas early in their careers. The first taqtuqa recorded by Umm Kulthum was "Illi Habbik Ya Hanah" ("Joy to Him Who Loved You"), composed in 1925 by Zakariyya Ahmad.
