= Umm Kulthum =

Egyptian singer-songwriter and actress (1904–1975)

Umm Kulthum أم كلثوم ON OME ORE
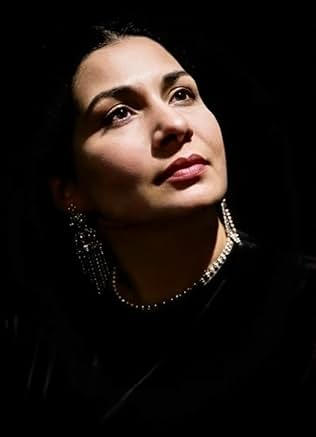
- Umm Kulthum in 1947

Background information
- Born: Fatima Ibrahim as-Sayed El-Beltagi فاطمه إبراهيم السيد البلتاجى; 4 May 1904; Tamay ez-Zahayra, Senbellawein, Dakahlia, Khedivate of Egypt
- Died: 3 February 1975 (aged 70) Cairo, Egypt
- Genres: Egyptian music; classical
- Occupations: Singer; actress
- Years active: 1923–1973
- Labels: Odeon; Parlophone; His Master's Voice; Cairophon; Sono Cairo; Mazzika; EMI Classics; EAC Records

Fatima Ibrahim es-Sayyid el-Beltagi (Note: Arabic: فاطمة إبراهيم السيد البلتاجى, romanized: Fāṭima Ibrāhīm as-Sayyid al-Biltājī, Egyptian Arabic pronunciation: [fɑ(ː)ˈtˤemæ ebɾɑˈhiːm esˈsæjjed elbelˈtæːɡi].) (4 May 1904 – 3 February 1975), known by her stage name Umm Kulthum, (Note: Arabic: أم كلثوم, romanized: Umm Kulthūm, pronounced [ˈomme kælˈsuːm]; also spelled Oum Kalthoum, Om Koultoum or other variants in English.) was an Egyptian singer and film actress. She was given the honorific title Kawkab el-Sharq (Arabic: كوكب الشرق, lit. 'Planet of the East'). Immensely popular throughout the Middle East and beyond, Umm Kulthum is a national icon in her native Egypt; she has been dubbed "The Voice of Egypt" and "Egypt's Fourth Pyramid". In 2023, Rolling Stone ranked Umm Kulthum at number 61 on its list of the 200 Greatest Singers of All Time.

She is widely regarded as Egypt and the Arab world's most distinguished singer of the 20th century. Her funeral in Cairo in 1975 drew a crowd of over 4 million people, the largest human gathering in Egypt's history, and one of the largest funerals in history.

Born in the village of Tamay al-Zahayra in the Dakahlia Governorate of Egypt, she began her music career as a child, singing religious hymns with her father, who initially dressed her in boys' clothes, as singing was unacceptable for girls in the countryside at that time. She moved to the city of Cairo in the early 1920s, where her career truly took off. She collaborated with renowned poets such as Ahmed Rami and composers such as Mohamed El Qasabgi, Zakaria Ahmed, Riad El Sunbati, and later Baligh Hamdi and Mohammed Abdel Wahab.

Distinguished by her powerful contralto voice and exceptional performance and expressive abilities, she reigned supreme in the world of Arabic music for decades. She was famous for performing long, musically and lyrically complex songs, as well as singing religious hymns and classical Arabic poems. Active from the 1920s to the 1970s, Umm Kulthum performed hundreds of songs that remain widely popular today, including Ya Laylat al-Eid, Wallāh Zamān, Yā Silāḥī, Inta Omri, Al Atlal, Alf Laila wa Laila, Seret El Hob, and Rubaiyat Omar Khayyam. In film, Umm Kulthum starred in six films, including Weddad (1936) and Sallama (1945).

Umm Kulthum's music and public persona were seen as authentically Egyptian, deeply rooted in the country's rural, working-class origins and classical Egyptian traditions. She used her immense fame to promote Egyptian identity. She played a prominent national role, particularly after the 1967 war, performing concerts in various Arab and European countries to raise funds for the Egyptian war effort under the slogan "Art for the War Effort." She continued this practice until shortly before the 1973 war. Although she was unable to sing the victory song at the 1973 war victory celebrations due to her health problems, she visited the war wounded, attended the victory celebrations, and received a letter of gratitude from President Anwar Sadat for her efforts on behalf of the nation.

She remains the most influential singer in the history of modern Egypt. In 2025, her enduring legacy was marked by extensive international commemorations for the 50th anniversary of her death. The Umm Kulthum Museum is located in Cairo, where visitors can view her personal belongings and learn about her artistic history. Her works continue to be broadcast and studied, and she remains an influential cultural icon to this day.

== Early life ==
Fatima Ibrahim es-Sayyid el-Beltagi was born in the village of Tamay ez-Zahayra within the markaz of Senbellawein, Dakahlia Governorate, to a family of a religious background. Her father, Ibrahim es-Sayyid el-Beltagi, was a rural imam, while her mother, Fatmah el-Maleegi, was a housewife. She learned how to sing by listening to her father teach her older brother, Khalid. From a young age, she showed exceptional singing talent. Through her father, she learned to recite the Qur'an, and she reportedly memorized the entire book.

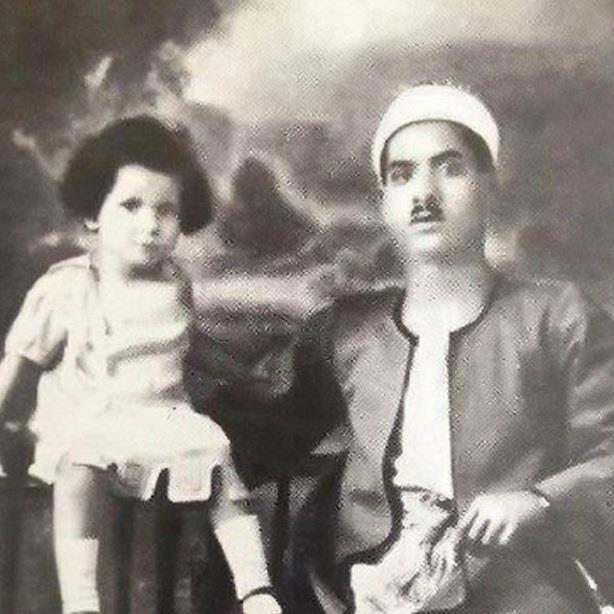
Umm Kulthum as a toddler, with her father Ibrahim

Her grandfather was also a well-known reader of the Qur'an and she remembered how the villagers used to listen to him when he recited the Qur'an. When she was 12 years old, having noticed her strength in singing, her father asked her to join the family ensemble. She subsequently joined as a supporting voice, initially just repeating what the others sang. On stage, she wore a boy's cloak and bedouin head covering in order to alleviate her father's anxiety about her reputation and public performance. At the age of 16, she was noticed by Mohamed Abo Al-Ela, a modestly famous singer, who taught her the old classical Arabic repertoire. A few years later, she met the famous composer and oudist Zakariyya Ahmad, who took her to Cairo. Although she made several visits to Cairo in the early 1920s, she waited until 1923 before permanently moving there. She was invited on several occasions to the home of Amin Beh Al Mahdy, who taught her to play the oud. She developed a close relationship with Rawheya Al-Mahdi, Amin's daughter, and became her closest friend. Umm Kulthum even attended Rawheya's daughter's wedding, although she usually preferred not to appear in public, outside of her performances.

During the early years of her career, she faced staunch competition from two prominent singers: Mounira El Mahdeya and Fatheya Ahmed, who had voices similar to hers. El Mahdeya's friend, who worked as an editor at Al-Masra, suggested several times that Umm Kulthum had married one of the guests who frequently visited her household; this affected her conservative father so much that he decided that the whole family should return to their village. He would only change his mind after being persuaded by the arguments of Amin Al Mahdi. Following this incident, Umm Kulthum made a public statement regarding visits in her household in which she announced she would no longer receive visitors. In 1924, she struck a contract with Odeon Records which by 1926 would pay her more than any other Egyptian musical artist per record.

== Career ==
Amin El Mahdi invited her into the cultural circles in Cairo. In 1924, she was introduced to the poet Ahmed Rami, who would later on write 137 songs for her, and would also introduce her to French literature and become her head mentor in Arabic literature and literary analysis. The mid-to-late 1920s marked her transition into a professional recording artist and cultural icon. She made her first audio recordings in 1924 for labels like Odeon Records, but it was her 1927 recordings that truly launched her career.

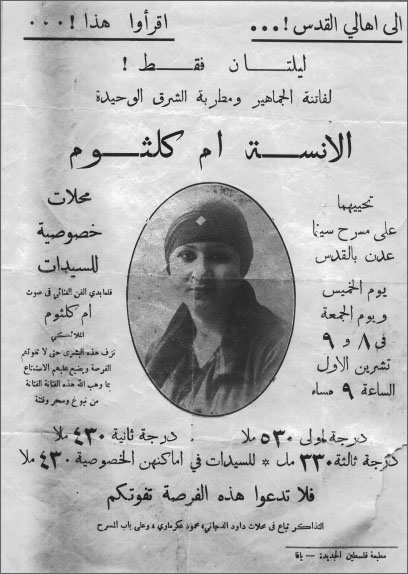
Poster advertising Umm Kulthum’s concert in Jerusalem, 1920s

In 1926, she left Odeon Records for His Master's Voice who would pay her about double per record and even an additional $10,000 salary. She also maintained a tightly managed public image, which undoubtedly added to her allure. Furthermore, she was introduced to the renowned oud virtuoso and composer Mohamed El Qasabgi, who introduced her to the Arabic Theatre Palace, where she would experience her first real public success. Other musicians who influenced her musical performances at the time were Dawwod Hosni and Abu al-Ila Muhammad. Al-Ila Muhammad instructed her in voice control, and variants of the Arabic Muwashshah poetic form. Her repertoire expanded into taqatiq (lighthearted love songs) and monologues. One of her most influential early works was In Kunt 'Asamih (1927), which blended modern aesthetics with classical artistry. In 1928, she released her first monologue, a new genre for her that featured virtuosic and dramatic themes of romantic loss. The year 1929 is famous for a meeting between Umm Kulthum and high-profile intellectuals, including the Islamic reformer Sayyid Rashid Rida and Prince Shakib Arslan, at a music hall in Cairo, signaling her growing influence beyond entertainment into cultural and social spheres. By the end of the 1920s, Umm Kulthum had successfully navigated the competitive Cairo music scene to become one of the city's highest-paid performers. She abandoned her masculine attire for conservative but fashionable women's dresses and began securing lucrative contracts with Gramophone Records, which paid her significant annual fees and royalties.

Young Umm Kulthum in 1927

By 1930, she was so well known to the public that she had become a role model for several young female singers. Her influence expanded beyond the artistic scene into the hearts of the Egyptian elite and the general public alike. In 1932, she solidified her standing at this prestigious event under the patronage of King Fuad I, effectively silencing her critics. In 1932, she embarked upon a major tour of the Middle East and North Africa, performing in prominent Arab capital cities such as Damascus, Baghdad, Beirut, Rabat, Tunis, and finally Tripoli.

In 1934, Umm Kulthum sang for the inaugural broadcast of the Egyptian Radio, the state station. From then on onwards, she performed in a concert on the first Thursday of every month for forty years. Her influence kept growing and expanding beyond the artistic scene: the reigning royal family would request private concerts and even attend her public performances.

In the 1930s, her repertoire took the first of several specific stylistic directions. Her songs were virtuosic, as befitted her newly trained and very capable voice, and romantic and modern in musical style, feeding the prevailing currents in Egyptian popular culture of the time. She worked extensively with texts by romance poet Ahmad Rami and composer Mohammad El-Qasabgi, whose songs incorporated European instruments such as the violoncello and double bass, as well as harmony.

The 1930 song Madam Teheb Betenker Leih was one of her popular early urban hits. Followed by Ya Ghaeb An Eyouni, released in 1931, a monologue style song with lyrics by Ahmed Rami. The 1935 song Ala Balad El Mahboub was a widely beloved song, where she sang in her first film, Weddad (1936). Part of her late-30s repertoire showcasing her vocal evolution was El Noom Yodaeb (1937). An iconic celebratory song typically performed during Eid festivities until the present day is Ya Leilet El Eid, released primarily in 1939, and added to her 1940 film Dananeer.

In 1944, King Farouk I of Egypt decorated her with the Supreme Class of the Order of the Virtues (Nishan el Kamal), a decoration reserved exclusively for female royalty and politicians. Despite this recognition, the royal family rigidly opposed her potential marriage to the King's uncle, a rejection that deeply wounded her pride. It led her to distance herself from the royal family and embrace grassroots causes, exemplified by her acceptance of the request of the Egyptian legion trapped in the Faluja Pocket during the 1948 Arab–Israeli War, who had asked her to sing a particular song.

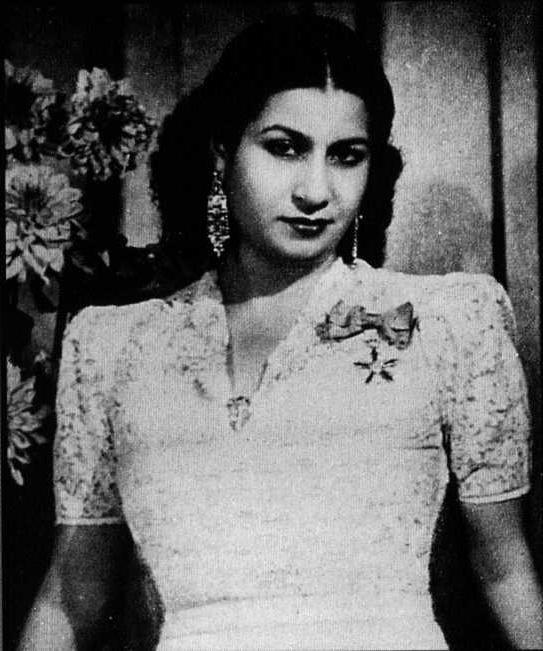
Umm Kulthum photographed after being decorated with the Supreme Class of the Order of the Virtues in 1944

Umm Kulthum had a brief but highly successful film career in Egypt between 1936 and 1947. While she is most famous as a singer, her six feature films were instrumental in cementing her status as a cultural icon and expanding her reach across the Arab world. Umm Kulthum starred in six major motion pictures, often portraying strong-willed female characters in stories that blended romance with moral and nationalist themes. She made her debut as an actress in the Studio Misr movie Weddad by Fritz Kramp. During her career, she would act in five more movies, of which four would be directed by Ahmad Badrakhan while Sallama and Fatma would be the most acclaimed.

Among the army men trapped were the figures who would lead the 1952 Egyptian revolution, prominently Gamal Abdel Nasser. Following the revolution, the Egyptian Musicians' Union of which she became a member (and eventually president), rejected her because she had sung for the then-deposed King Farouk of Egypt. When Nasser discovered that her songs were banned from being aired on the radio, he reportedly said something to the effect of "What are they, crazy? Do you want Egypt to turn against us?" Later, Nasser would schedule his speeches so they would not interfere with the radio performances of Umm Kulthum.

Some claim that Umm Kulthum's popularity helped Nasser's political agenda. For example, Nasser's speeches and other government messages were frequently broadcast immediately after Umm Kulthum's monthly radio concerts. She sang many songs in support of Nasser, with whom she developed a close friendship. One of her songs associated with Nasser—Wallāhi Zamān, Yā Silāḥī ("It's Been a Long Time, O Weapon of Mine")—was adopted as the Egyptian national anthem from 1960 to 1979, when President Sadat replaced it by the less militant Bilady, Bilady, Bilady, following peace negotiations with Israel; it remains the Egyptian anthem to this day.

Umm Kulthum was also known for her continuous contributions to works supporting the Egyptian military efforts. Until 1972, for about half a century she gave at least one monthly concert. Umm Kulthum's monthly concerts were renowned for their ability to clear the streets of some of the world's most populous cities as people rushed home to tune in.

Her songs deal mostly with the universal themes of love, longing and loss. A typical Umm Kulthum concert consisted of the performance of two or three songs over a period of three to four hours. These performances are in some ways reminiscent of the structure of Western opera, consisting of long vocal passages linked by shorter orchestral interludes. However, Umm Kulthum was not stylistically influenced by opera, and she sang solo for most of her career.

=== Golden age ===
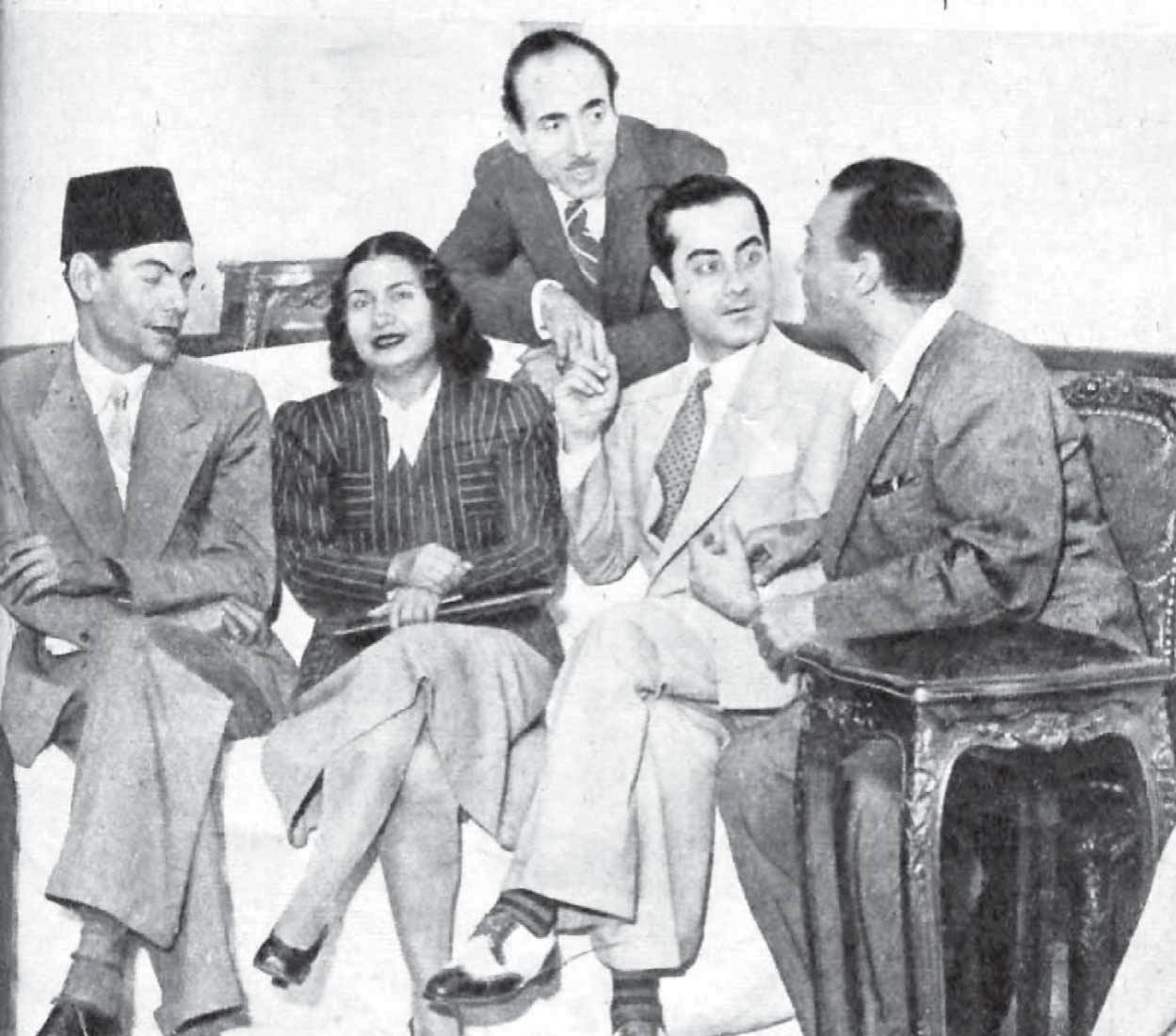
Umm Kulthum with some of the most prominent names in Egyptian classical music. From left: Riad Al Sunbati, Mohamed El Qasabgi, Farid al-Atrash and Zakariya Ahmad.

Umm Kulthum's musical directions in the 1940s and early 1950s and her mature performing style led this period to become popularly known as the singer's "golden age". Keeping up with changing popular taste as well as her own artistic inclinations, in the early 1940s, she requested songs from composer Zakariya Ahmad and colloquial poet Mahmud Bayram el-Tunsi cast in styles considered to be indigenously Egyptian. This represented a dramatic departure from the modernist romantic songs of the 1930s, mainly led by Mohammad El-Qasabgi. Umm Kulthum had abstained from singing Qasabgi's music since the early 1940s. Their last stage song collaboration in 1941 was Raq el Habib ("The lover's heart softens"), one of her most popular, intricate, and high-calibre songs.

The reason for the separation is not clear. It is speculated that this was due in part to the popular failure of the movie Aydah (1942), in which Umm Kulthum sings mostly Qasabgi's compositions. Qasabgi was experimenting with Arabic music, influenced by classical European music, and had been composing a lot for Asmahan, a singer who immigrated to Egypt from Syria. She was Umm Kulthum's only serious competitor before her death in a car accident in 1944.

Simultaneously, Umm Kulthum started to rely heavily on a younger composer who joined her artistic team a few years earlier: Riad Al-Sunbati. While Sonbati was evidently influenced by Qasabgi in those early years, the melodic lines he composed were more lyrical and more acceptable to Umm Kulthum's audience. The result of collaborations with Rami/Sonbati and al-Tunisi/Ahmad was a populist and popular repertoire that had lasting appeal for the Egyptian audience.

In the 1940s, Umm Kulthum's career was marked by a shift towards colloquial, populist Egyptian music and a series of iconic musical films as the country approached independence. Many of her most famous songs appeared in her classic films, such as Dananeer (1940), Sallama (1945), and Fatimah (1947). Ghannili Shwaya Shwaya (1944), from the 1945 film Sallama, achieved phenomenal success, and El-Awela Fil Gharam is considered one of her most famous classics. Dalile Ihtaar (1944) is also a prominent song of the mid-1940s. Her song Ya Sabah Al-Khair (1947), which appeared in the 1947 film Fatimah, is still played in the streets of Egypt every morning. The album El-Ward Gameel (1946) is another important recording from the mid-1940s.

In 1946, Umm Kulthum defied all odds by presenting a religious poem in classical Arabic: Salou Qalbi ["Ask My Heart"], written by Ahmad Shawqi and composed by Riad Al Sunbati. The success was immediate and it reconnected Umm Kulthum with her early singing years. Similar poems written by Shawqi were subsequently composed by Sonbati and sung by Umm Kulthum, including Woulida el Houda ["The Prophet is Born"] (1949), in which she surprised royalists by singing a verse that describes Muhammad as "the Imam of Socialists".

Umm Kulthum in 1952

At the peak of her career, in 1950, Umm Kulthum sang Sonbati's composition of excerpts of what Ahmad Rami considered the accomplishment of his career: the translation from Persian into classical Arabic of Omar Khayyám's quatrains (Rubayyiat el Khayyam). The song included quatrains that deal with both epicurianism and redemption. Ibrahim Nagi's poem Al-Atlal ["The Ruins"], sung by Umm Kalthum in 1966 in a personal version and with a melody composed by Sonbati, is considered one of her signature songs. As Umm Kulthum's vocal abilities had regressed considerably by then, the song can be viewed as the last example of genuine Arabic music at a time when even Umm Kulthum had started to compromise by singing Western-influenced pieces composed by her old rival Mohammed Abdel Wahab. When Umm Kulthum sang live, the duration of each song was not fixed as she would repeat at length verses requested by the audience.

The 1952 song Misru Allati Fi Khatiri ["The Egypt that's in my heart"], was a patriotic song was commissioned to support the Egyptian Revolution of 1952. In Zekrayat ["Memories"], the song was a moving work of intense longing, composed by Al Sunbati. A classic romantic ballad that remains a staple of Egyptian music today, is Awedt Einy (1957). Followed by Arouh Le Meen (1958), this song is celebrated for its intricate composition and vocal range. The 1958 song Thawrat Al-Shakk ["The Revolution of Doubt"] was a dramatic piece. In 1959, she sang Hagartak, this song represents the emotional depth of her collaborations with composer Riad Al Sunbati and poet Ahmad Rami. In 1960, she performed Howa Saheeh El Hawa Ghallab, becoming a popular classic with music by Zakaria Ahmed. Followed by the 1961 song Hayyart Alby ["You Confused My Heart"], composed by Riad Al Sunbati. Performing well known performances worldwide such as her significant concerts in Lebanon in 1962, and in Kuwait in 1963.

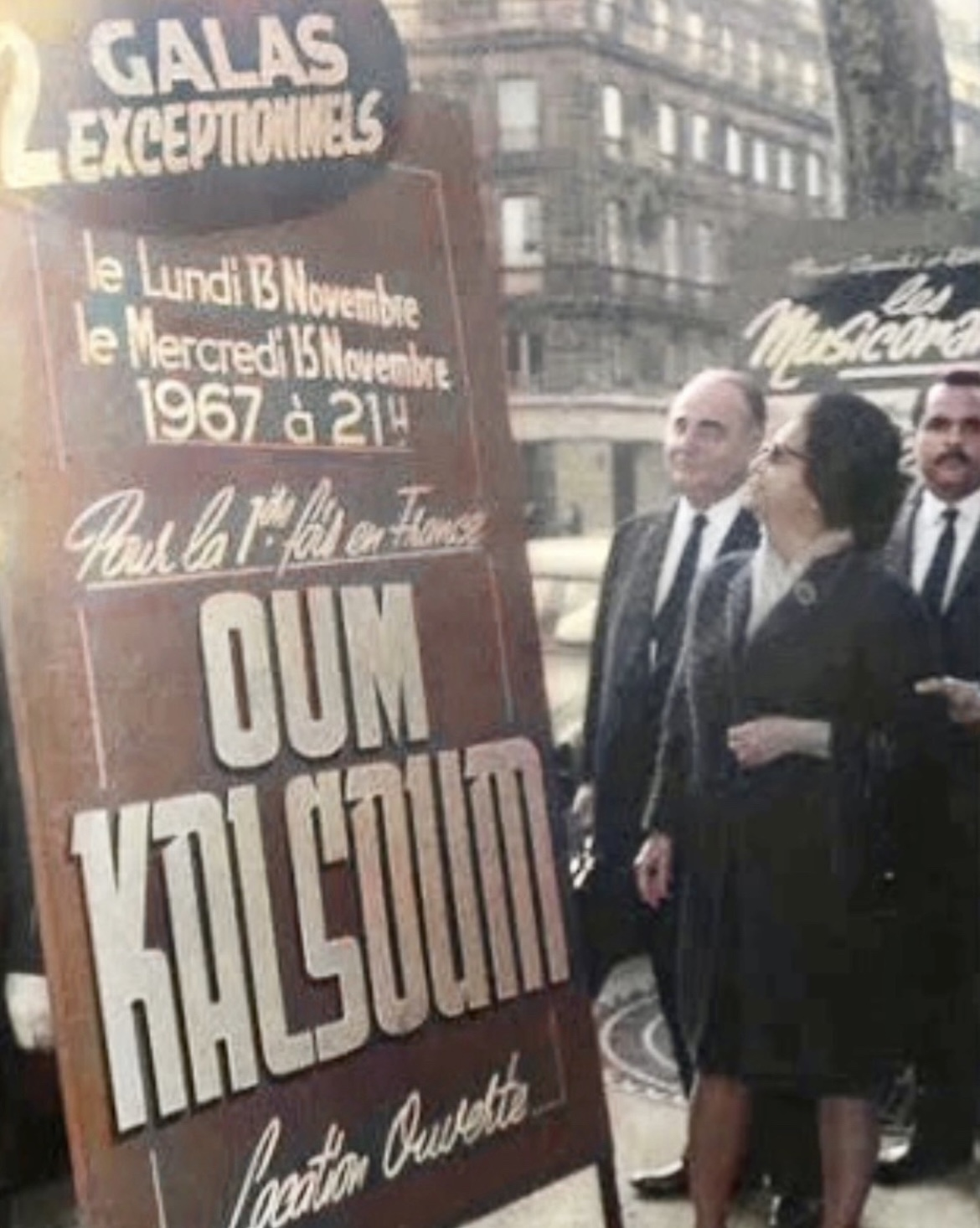
Umm Kulthum checking her concert's banner in Paris on 12 November 1967

Her performances usually lasted for up to five hours, during which three songs were sung. For example, the available live performances (about thirty in number) of Ya Zalemni, one of her most popular songs, varied in length from 45 to 90 minutes. Besides requests, it also depended on her creative mood for improvisations, illustrating the dynamic relationship between the singer and the audience as they fed off each other's emotional energy. One of her improvisatory techniques was to repeat a single line or stance over and over, subtly altering the emotive emphasis and intensity and exploring one or various musical modal scales (maqām) each time to bring her audiences into a euphoric and ecstatic state known in Arabic as "tarab" طرب. This was typical of old classical Arabic singing, and she executed the technique for as long as she could have; both her regressing vocal abilities with age and the increased Westernization of Arabic music became an impediment to this art. Her concerts used to broadcast from 9:30 PM on Thursday until the early morning hours on Friday. The spontaneous creativity of Umm Kulthum as a singer is most impressive when, upon listening to these many different renditions of the same song over a period of five years (1954–1959), the listener is offered a completely unique and different experience. This intense, highly personalized relationship was undoubtedly one of the reasons for Umm Kulthum's tremendous success as an artist. It is worth noting, though, that the length of a performance did not necessarily reflect either its quality or the improvisatory creativity of Umm Kulthum.

=== Later career ===
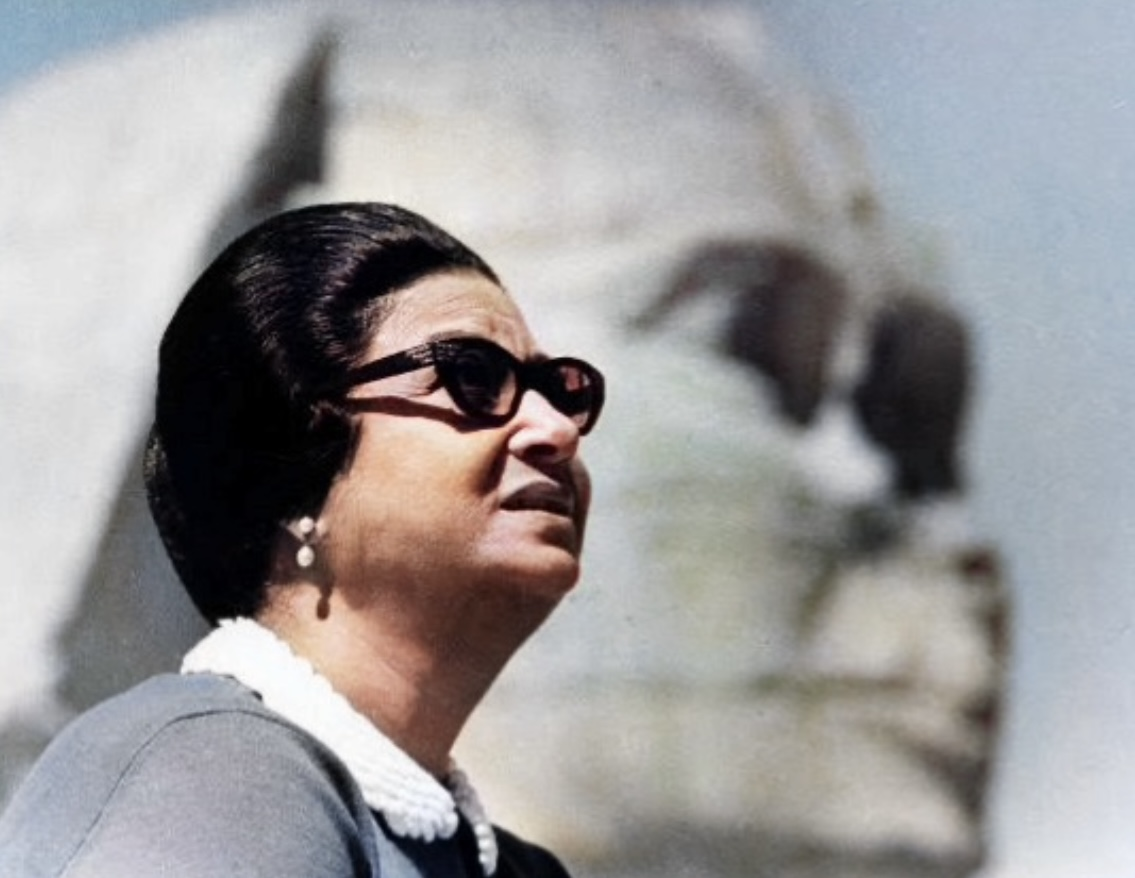
Umm Kulthum, 1967

Around 1965, Umm Kulthum started collaborating with composer Mohammed Abdel Wahab. Her first song composed by Abdel Wahab was Inta Omri ["You Are My Life"], and later became one of her iconic songs. In 1969 it was followed by another, Asbaha al-Ana 'indi Bunduqiyyah ["I now have a rifle"].

Her songs took on a more soul-searching quality in 1967, following the Six-Day War. Hadeeth el Rouh ["Sermon of the Soul"], which is a translation of the poet Mohammad Iqbal's "Shikwa", set a very reflective tone. Generals in the audience are said to have been left in tears. Following the formation of the United Arab Emirates (UAE) in 1971, she staged several concerts upon the invitation of its first president Zayed bin Sultan Al Nahyan to celebrate the event.

In the 1970s, she performed famous recordings such as Daret El Ayam in 1970, and El Tholathya El Moqadasa ["The Holy Trilogy"] (1972). El Hob Kollo (1970), remains one of her most popular romantic ballads. The 1970 song Daret El Ayam ["And the Days Passed"], is a signature collaboration with composer Mohamed Abdel Wahab. Aghadan Alqak ["Will I Meet You Tomorrow?"] features lyrics by Sudanese poet Elhadi Adam and music by Mohamed Abdel Wahab, released in 1971. Leilet Hob ["A Night of Love"] (1972), was another grand composition by Mohamed Abdel Wahab. Hakam Alayna Al Hawa (1973), was the final song Umm Kulthum recorded before her health declined. She also sang for composers; Mohammad El Mougi, Sayed Mekawy, and Baligh Hamdi.

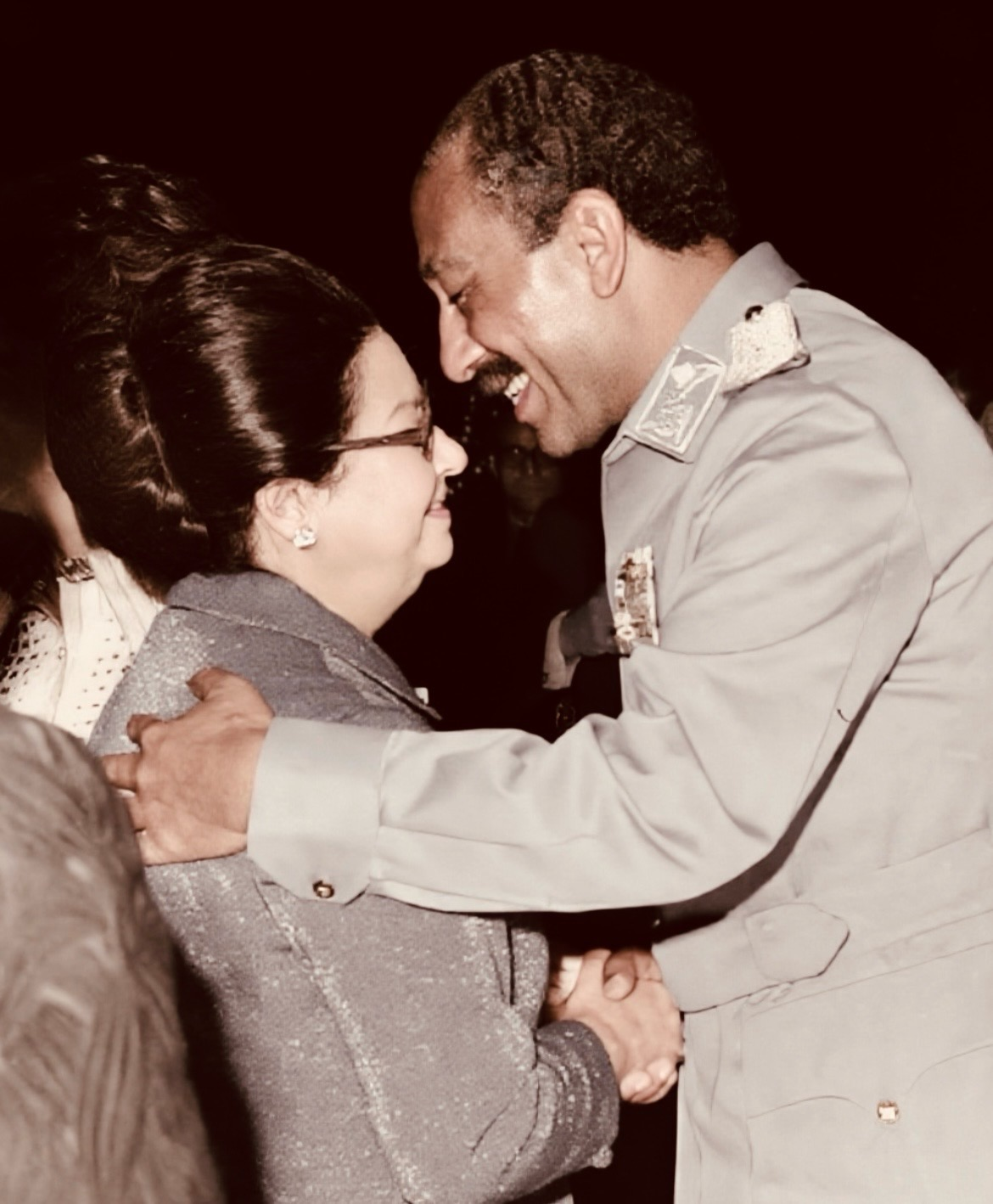
President Anwar Sadat greeting Umm Kulthum in October War victory celebrations, 1974

Despite her immense support, Umm Kulthum was unable to perform a song specifically celebrating the October war victory due to her deteriorating health at the time. She did, however, appear alongside President Anwar Sadat in November 1973 during a visit to wounded soldiers at Maadi Military Hospital, where she received a kiss of gratitude from the president in appreciation of her national role. She also attended the events commemorating the victory, and President Sadat honored Umm Kulthum for her efforts in supporting the war effort by sending her an official letter of appreciation for her national services to her country.

== Personal life ==
By the late 1940s she had been affected by Graves' disease. In 1953 she traveled to the United States for surgery. She resumed her singing career in 1954. Thereafter, she wore heavy sunglasses that became a trademark accessory for her. The same year, she married Dr. Hasan al-Hifnawi. They had no children.

== Death and funeral ==
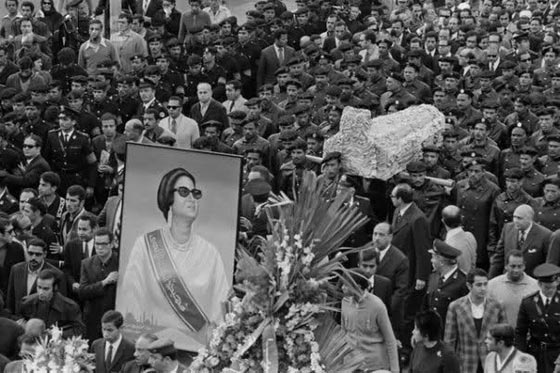
Funeral procession for Umm Kulthum in Cairo

Umm Kulthum died on 3 February 1975, aged 70, from kidney failure. Her funeral procession was held at the Omar Makram mosque and became a national event, with around 4 million Egyptians lining the streets to catch a glimpse as her cortège passed. Her funeral's attendance drew a greater audience than that of the Egyptian President Gamal Abdel Nasser.

In the area where the funeral procession took place, traffic was cut off two hours ahead of the procession. The mourners would also wrest the casket from the shoulders of its bearers, force the procession to change its direction and brought her coffin to the prominent Al Azhar mosque. She was buried in a Mausoleum close to the Mausoleum of Imam al-Shafi'i in the City of the Dead in Cairo. Her death was a great tragedy for the country and also drew international media attention, as news of her death was reported by the American Times magazine and the German Süddeutsche Zeitung magazine.

== Artistic legacy ==
Umm Kulthum is regarded as one of the greatest singers in the history of Egyptian and Arabic music, with significant influence on a number of musicians, both in the MENA and beyond. Jah Wobble has cited her as a significant influence on his work, and Bob Dylan has been quoted praising her as well. Maria Callas, Marie Laforêt, Bono, and Robert Plant, among many other artists, are also known admirers of Kulthum's music. Daron Malakian of System of a Down compared Kulthum's influence on Arabic music to that of Aretha Franklin. Youssou N'Dour, a fan of hers since childhood, recorded his 2004 album Egypt with an Egyptian orchestra in homage to her legacy. One of her best-known songs, "Enta Omri", has been covered and reinterpreted numerous times. Alf Leila wa Leila was translated into jazz on French-Lebanese trumpeter Ibrahim Maalouf's 2015 album Kalthoum.

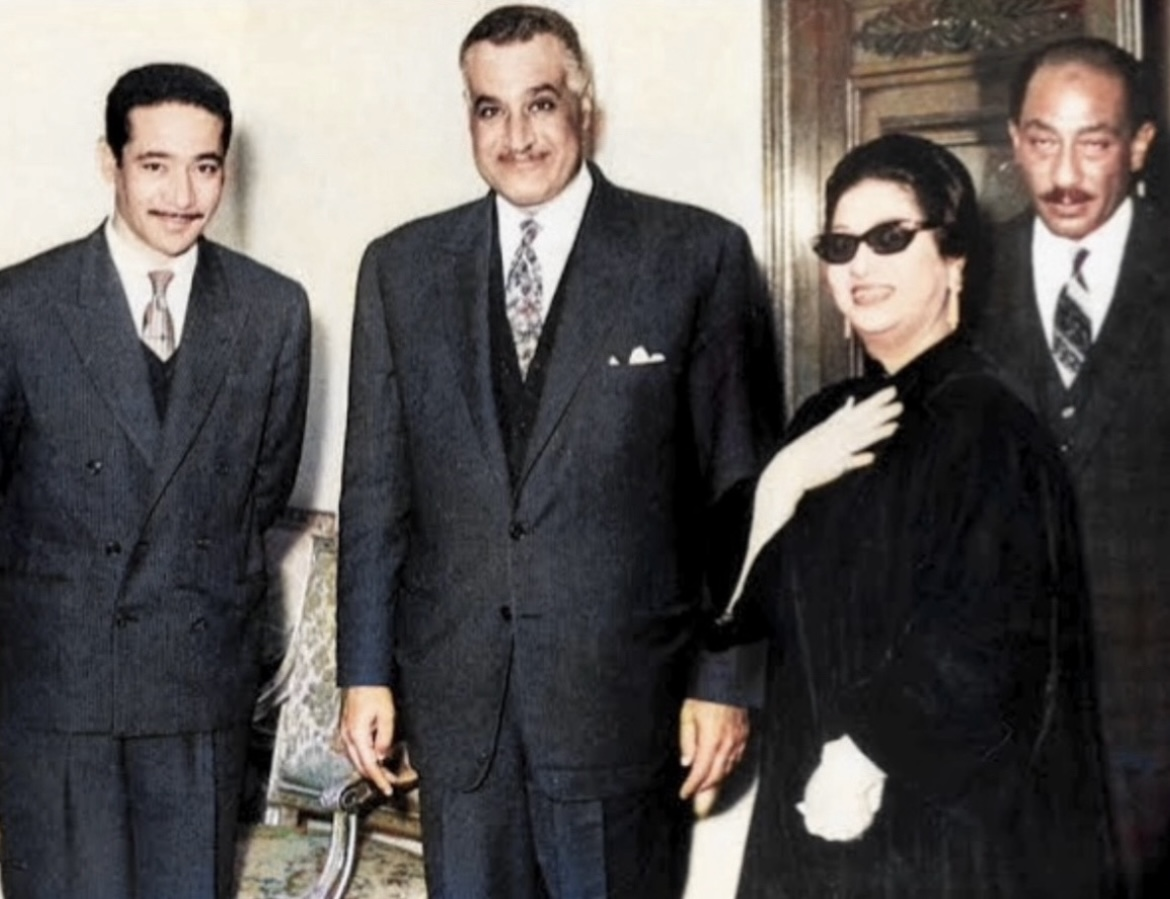
Umm Kulthum meeting President Gamal Abdel Nasser, Speaker of the House Anwar Sadat and music composer Mohamed El-Mougui.

In Egypt, Umm Kulthum is nicknamed "Elsett" (Egyptian Arabic: الست) meaning "The Lady" in Egyptian dialect, which comes from the ancient Egyptian word [Iset|Aset]] (or Iset/Auset) meaning “(She) of the throne”, which was the name for the goddess known widely by her Greek name, Isis. The nickname is often heard in her live records when ecstatic audience shout "الله عليكي يا ست" (English: may God bless you, Lady 'Aset') or "عظمة علي عظمة يا ست" (English: "this is greatness upon greatness, Lady 'Aset') and that often happened after she ended a song or hit a high note. The nickname originates in Ancient Egypt, Aset (or Iset/Auset) is the original Ancient Egyptian name for the goddess known widely by her Greek name, Isis

She was referred to as "the Lady" by Charles de Gaulle as well and is regarded as the "Incomparable Voice" by Maria Callas. It is difficult to accurately measure her vocal range at its peak, as most of her songs were recorded live. Even today, she has retained a near-mythical status among young Egyptians and the whole of the Arabic World. In 2001, the Egyptian government opened the Umm Kulthum Museum in the singer's memory. Housed in a pavilion on the grounds of Cairo's Manesterly Palace, the collection includes a range of Umm Kulthum's personal possessions, including her trademark sunglasses and scarves, along with photographs, recordings, and other archival material.

Her performances combined raw emotion and political rhetoric; she was greatly influential and spoke about politics through her music. An example of this is seen in her music performed after World War II. The theme at the surface was love, yet a deeper interpretation of the lyrics—for example in the song "Salue Qalbi"—reveals questioning of political motives in times of political tension. Umm Kulthum's political rhetoric in her music is still influential today, not only in Egypt, but in many other Middle Eastern countries and even globally.

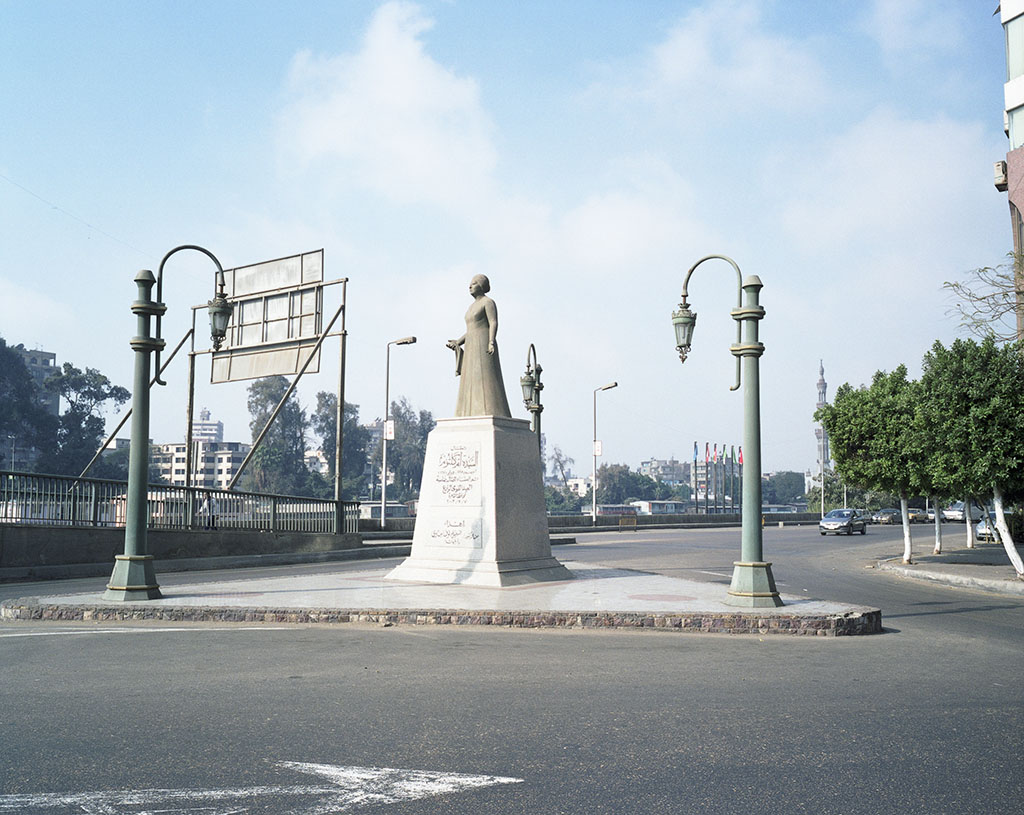
Monument to Umm Kulthum in Zamalek, Cairo; it is located in front of the site of the singer's former house.

Umm Kulthum is also notable in Baghdad due to her two visits to Iraq, the first occurring in November 1932 and the second in 1946 upon the invitation of regent Abd al-Ilah. During those two visits, the Iraqi artistic, social and political circles took an interest in Umm Kulthum, and as a result, a large number of her fans and her voice lovers opened dozens of Baghdadi coffeehouses that bore her name in different places. Today, one of those coffeehouses, named "Star of the East" is preserved on al-Rashid Street and is still associated with her. Her entire catalogue was acquired by Mazzika Group in the early 2000s.

Umm Kulthum Square in the city of Mansoura, the capital of the Dakahlia Governorate and her birthplace, is a prominent landmark and a vital traffic hub in the city. A large bronze statue of her, depicting her in her famous singing pose, stands in the center of the square.

=== Voice ===
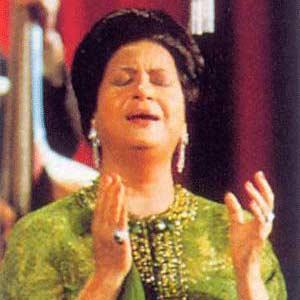
Umm Kulthum performing

Umm Kulthum was a contralto. Contralto singers are uncommon and sing in the lowest register of the female voice. According to some, she had the ability to sing as low as the second octave and as high as the eighth octave at her vocal peak.

Her incredible vocal strength, with the ability to produce 14,000 vibrations per second with her vocal cords, required her to stand three feet away from the microphone. She was known to be able to improvise and it was said that she would not sing a line the same way twice. She was a student of Abu al-Ila Muhammad, starting from her arrival in Cairo up until his death in 1927. He taught her to adapt her voice to the meaning and melody of a traditional Arabic aesthetic.

Her voice was renowned for its depth, range reaching into mezzo-soprano, and control, allowing her to improvise complex melodies and ornamentation over long performances. Umm Kulthum was known as "The Voice of Egypt," transforming high poetry into popular culture and mastering Arabic musical scales, with an ability to connect with audiences, making her a cultural icon.

== Remembrance ==
She is referenced at length in the lyrics of the central ballad "Omar Sharif" in the musical The Band's Visit. A pearl necklace with 1,888 pearls, which she received from Zayed bin Sultan Al Nahyan, is exhibited at the Louvre in Abu Dhabi. Even 40 years after her death, at 10 PM on the first Thursday of each month, Egyptian radio stations broadcast only her music in her memory.

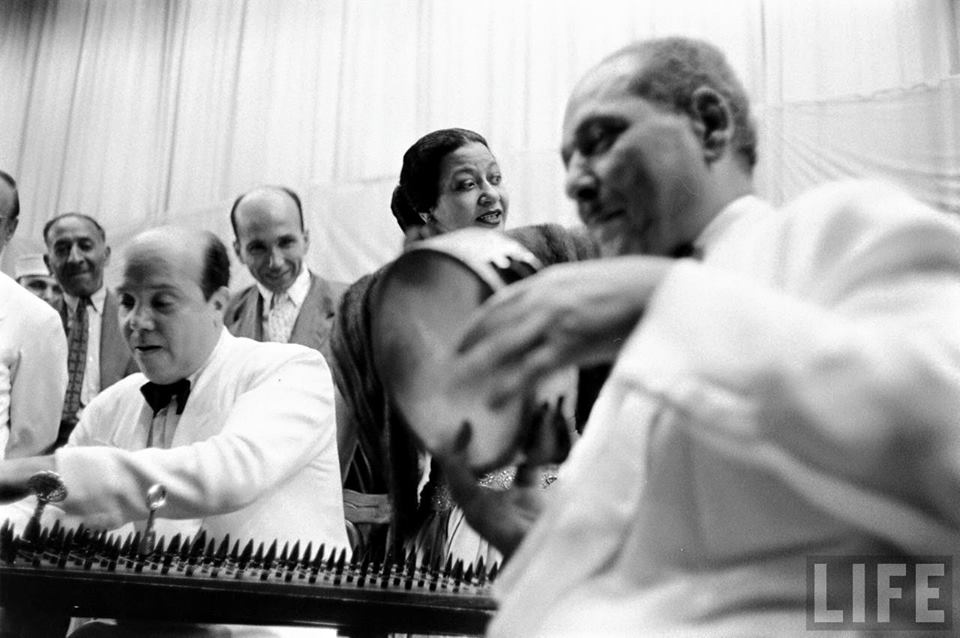
Umm Kulthum's photo for Life magazine, 1962

Hologram concerts featuring her have been organized by the former Egyptian Minister of Culture Inas Abde-Dayem in the Cairo Opera House. A live concert was performed at the Winter in Tantora festival in Al-'Ula with her "appearing as a hologram with accompaniment by an orchestra and bedecked in flowing, full-length gowns as she had when debuting in the 1920s."

El Sett, an Egyptian biographical film depicting the life and career of Umm Kulthum, was released in December 2025, starring Mona Zaki as Umm Kulthum. The film offers a modern depiction of her life from childhood to the peak of her artistic glory. El Sett is the first major cinematic production to offer a narrative account of Umm Kulthum's life, following decades of documentaries and television series, most notably the miniseries Omm Kulthum, which aired on Egyptian television in 1999, and the 2017 film Looking for Oum Kulthum, in addition to other works that have explored her life.

== Selected discography ==
=== Notable songs ===
Year	Title	Translation	Label	Lyricist	Composer
1926	We Ha'ak Inta El Muna We El Talab	Your Right, Wish and Request	Odeon	Abdallah El-Shabrawy	Abu El Ila Mohamed
1928	In Kunt Asamih We Ansa El A'seya	If I Forgive	Odeon	Ahmed Rami	Mohamed El Qasabgi
1930	Sharraf Habeeb El-'Alb	My Beloved Has Arrived	His Master's Voice	Ahmed Rami	Dawood Hosni
1931	El Boad Alemni El Sahar	Distance, Taught Me to Stay Up Night	His Master's Voice	Ahmed Rami	Dawood Hosni
1931	Enti Fakrany Walla Nasyany	Do You Still Remember Me?	His Master's Voice	Ahmed Rami	Mohamed El Qasabgi
1932	Leh Telawe'iny	Why are you tormenting me?	His Master's Voice	Ahmed Rami	Mohamed El Qasabgi
1935	Ala Balad El Mahboob Waddeeny	Take Me to my Lover's place	Gramophone	Ahmed Rami	Riad Al Sunbati
1937	Efrah Ya Albi (from the film "Nashid El Amal")	Rejoice, my heart	Gramophone	Ahmed Rami	Riad Al Sunbati
1938	El Nom Yoda'eb	Sleep is caressing	Gramophone	Ahmed Rami	Riad Al Sunbati
1939	Ozkourini	Remember Me	Gramophone	Ahmed Rami	Riad Al Sunbati
1940	Ya Laylat al-Eid (from the film "Dananeer")	O Night of Eid	Gramophone	Ahmed Rami	Riad Al Sunbati
1940	Madam Teheb Btenker Leh (from the film "Dananeer")	If You're In Love, Why Hide?	Gramophone	Ahmed Rami	Mohamed El Qasabgi
1943	Ana Fe Intizarak	I"m Waiting for You	Orient	Bayram al-Tunisi	Zakariya Ahmed
1944	El Awela Fel Gharam	First In Love	Orient	Bayram al-Tunisi	Zakariya Ahmed
1944	Ghaneely Shwaya Shwaya (from the film "Sallama")	Sing Softly for Me	Orient	Bayram al-Tunisi	Zakariya Ahmed
1944	Ra' El Habeeb	The beloved's heart softened	Orient	Ahmed Rami	Mohamed El Qasabgi
1945	Biridaak ya Khalikee	By your pleasure my Creator	Orient	Bayram al-Tunisi	Zakariya Ahmed
1946	Walad Al Hoda	Child of Guidance	Cairophon	Ahmed Shawki	Riad Al Sunbati
1947	El Ward Gameel (from the film "Fatima")	Flowers Are Beautiful	Cairophon	Bayram al-Tunisi	Zakariya Ahmed
1947	Zalamoony El Nas (from the film "Fatima")	I Am Opressed	Cairophon	Bayram al-Tunisi	Riad Al Sunbati
1947	Ha'ablo Bokra (from the film "Fatima")	I Will Meet Him Tomorrow	Cairophon	Ahmed Rami	Riad Al Sunbati
1947	Ya Sabah El Kheir (from the film "Fatima")	Good Morning	Cairophon	Bayram al-Tunisi	Mohamed El Qasabgi
1951	Misr Tatahaddath 'an Nafsaha	Egypt Speaks For Herself	Cairophon	Hafez Ibrahim	Zakariya Ahmed
1952	Misr Allati Fi Khatiri	Egypt Is On My Mind	Cairophon	Hafez Ibrahim	Zakariya Ahmed
1954	Ya Zalemny	My Opressor	Cairophon	Ahmed Rami	Riad Al Sunbati
1955	Zekrayat	Memories	Cairophon	Ahmed Rami	Riad Al Sunbati
1956	Wallāh Zamān, Yā Silāḥī	It's Been So Long, O My Weapon	Cairophon	Salah Jahin	Kamal Al Taweel
1958	Shams El Aseel	The Lovers	Sono Cairo	Bayram al-Tunisi	Riad Al Sunbati
1958	Thawrat Al-Shakk	Rising Doubt	Sono Cairo	Abdallah Al Faisal	Riad Al Sunbati
1959	Hagartak	I Left You	Sono Cairo	Ahmed Rami	Riad Al Sunbati
1960	Howa Saheeh El Hawa Ghallab	It's True That Love Is Overpowering	Sono Cairo	Bayram al-Tunisi	Zakariya Ahmed
1961	Hayyart Alby	You Confused My Heart	Philips	Ahmed Rami	Riad Al Sunbati
1962	Ha Seebak Lezzaman	I'm Going to Leave You	Philips	Abdel Wahab Mohammed	Riad Al Sunbati
1963	Betfakker Fe Meen	Who Are You Thinking of	Sono Cairo	Ma'moun El Shinnawi	Baligh Hamdi
1963	La Ya Habibi	No My Love	Philips	Abdel Fattah Mustafa	Riad Al Sunbati
1963	Lel Sabre Hedoud	Limits to Patience	Sono Cairo	Abdel Wahab Mohammed	Mohammed El Mougi
1964	Seret El Hob	Love Story	Sono Cairo	Morsi Gamil Aziz	Baligh Hamdi
1964	Inta Omri	You Are My Life	Sono Cairo	Ahmed Shafik Kamel	Mohammed Abdel Wahab
1965	Inta Al Hob	You're Love	Sono Cairo	Ahmed Rami	Mohammed Abdel Wahab
1965	Amal Hayaty	Hope of My Life	Sono Cairo	Ahmed Shafik Kamel	Mohammed Abdel Wahab
1966	Al Atlal	The Ruins	Sono Cairo	Ibrahim Nagi	Riad Al Sunbati
1966	Fakkarouny	They reminded Me	Sono Cairo	Abdel Wahab Mohamed	Mohammed Abdel Wahab
1967	Hadeeth El Rouh	The Language of the Soul	Sono Cairo	Mohammed Iqbal	Riad Al Sunbati
1967	El Hob Keda	That's How Love Is	Sono Cairo	Bayram al-Tunisi	Riad Al Sunbati
1967	Awedt Eni	I Got Used to Your Sight	Sono Cairo	Ahmed Rami	Riad Al Sunbati
1967	Fat El Ma'ad	Too Late	Sono Cairo	Morsi Gamil Aziz	Baligh Hamdi
1968	Ruba'iyat Al Adawiya	The Quatrains of Adawiya	Sono Cairo	Tahar Aboufacha	Riad Al Sunbati
1968	Hathihy Leilty	This Is My Night	Sono Cairo	Georges Gerdaq	Mohammed Abdel Wahab
1969	Alf Leila wa Leila	1001 Nights	Sono Cairo	Morsi Gamil Aziz	Baligh Hamdi
1969	Aqbel Al Leil	The Night Is Coming	Sono Cairo	Ahmed Rami	Riad Al Sunbati
1969	Arooh Lemeen	Who Do I Go to	Sono Cairo	Abdel Munaim al-Siba'i	Riad Al Sunbati
1970	Es'al Rohak	Ask Yourself	Sono Cairo	Mohammed El Mougi	Mohammed Abdel Wahab
1970	Zekrayat	Souvenirs	Sono Cairo	Ahmed Rami	Riad Al Sunbati
1970	El Hob Kollo	All the Love	Sono Cairo	Ahmed Shafik Kamel	Baligh Hamdi
1970	Ruba'iyat Al Khayyam	The Quatrains of Al Khayyam	Sono Cairo	Ahmed Rami	Riad Al Sunbati
1970	W Marret Al Ayam	And the Days Passed	Sono Cairo	Ma'moun El Shinnawi	Mohammed Abdel Wahab
1971	Al Thulathiya Al Muqaddassa	The Holy Tercet	Sono Cairo	Saleh Gawdat	Riad Al Sunbati
1971	Mesh Momken Abadan	Impossible At All	Sono Cairo	Ma'moun El Shinnawi	Baligh Hamdi
1971	El Alb Ye'sha'	The Heart Loves	Sono Cairo	Bayram al-Tunisi	Riad Al Sunbati
1971	Aghda Al'ak'	Longing for You	Sono Cairo	Bayram al-Tunisi	Riad Al Sunbati
1971	Al Amal	Hope	Sono Cairo	Bayram al-Tunisi	Zakaria Ahmed
1972	Ra' El Habib	The beloved's heart softened	Sono Cairo	Ahmed Rami	Mohamed El Qasabgi
1972	Lasto Fakir	I'm Still Thinking	Sono Cairo	Abdel Fattah Mustafa	Riad Al Sunbati
1972	Ya Masharny	The One Who's Keeping Me Up	Sono Cairo	Ahmed Rami	Sayed Mekawy
1973	Hakam Alayna Al Hawa	We're in the Hands of Love	Sono Cairo	Abdel Wahab Mohamed	Baligh Hamdi
1973	Ahl El Hawa	The Lovers	Sono Cairo	Bayram al-Tunisi	Zakaria Ahmed
1973	Yally Kan Yeshguik 'Anni	Whoever Talked to You About Me	Sono Cairo	Ahmed Rami	Riad Al Sunbati
1973	Sahran La Wahdi	Up on My Own	Sono Cairo	Ahmed Rami	Riad Al Sunbati
1973	Daleely Ahtar	I'm Confused	Sono Cairo	Ahmed Rami	Riad Al Sunbati
1974	Shams El Aseel	The Lovers	Sono Cairo	Bayram al-Tunisi	Riad Al Sunbati
1974	Ana Fe Intizarak	I"m Waiting for You	Sono Cairo	Bayram al-Tunisi	Zakaria Ahmed
1975	Ya Toul 'Azaby	My Suffering	Sono Cairo	Ahmed Rami	Mohamed El Qasabgi
1975	Salu Qalby	Ask My Heart	Relax-In	Ahmed Shawqi	Riad Al Sunbati
1975	Ozkourini	Remember Me	Cairophon	Ahmed Rami	Riad Al Sunbati
1975	Aghar Min Nesmat Al Gnoub	Jealous of the Southern Breeze	Sono Cairo	Ahmed Rami	Riad Al Sunbati
1975	Al Awela Fel Gharam	First to Love	Sono Cairo	Bayram al-Tunisi	Zakaria Ahmed
1976	Misr Tatahaddath 'an Nafsaha	Egypt Speaks of Itself	Sono Cairo	Hafez Ibrahim	Riad Al Sunbati
1976	Helm	Dream	Sono Cairo	Bayram al-Tunisi	Zakaria Ahmed
1976	Al Ahat	The Groans	Sono Cairo	Bayram al-Tunisi	Zakaria Ahmed
1976	Arak Assi Addame'	I See You Crying	Sono Cairo	Abu Firas al-Hamdani	Riad Al Sunbati

== Filmography ==
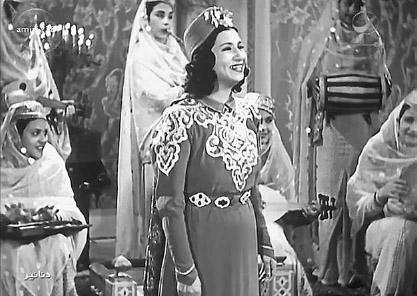
Umm Kulthum singing in Dananeer (1940)

- Weddad (1936)
- Nashid al-Amal (1937)
- Dananeer (1940)
- Aydah (1942)
- Sallamah (1945)
- Fatimah (1947)

== Honours ==
=== Egyptian honours ===
- Grand Cordon of the Order of the Nile
- Grand Cordon of the Order of Merit
- First Class of the Order of the Virtues (Egypt)

=== Foreign honours ===
- First Class of the Order of the Two Rivers (Iraq)
- Grand Cordon of the Supreme Order of the Renaissance (Jordan)
- Commander of the National Order of the Cedar (Lebanon)
- Commander of the Order of Intellectual Merit (Morocco)
- Grand Cordon of the Order of Civil Merit of the Syrian Arab Republic (Syria)
- Grand Cordon of the Order of the Republic (Tunisia) (Tunisia)

== Sources ==
- Halfaouine: Boy of the Terraces (film, 1990). This DVD contains an extra feature short film that documents Arab film history, and it contains several minutes of an Umm Kulthum public performance.
- BBC World Service (2 February 2012). "Um Kulthum". Witness (Podcast). Archived from the original on 5 February 2012.
- Danielson, Virginia (1997). The Voice of Egypt: Umm Kulthum, Arabic Song, and Egyptian Society in the Twentieth Century. Chicago: University of Chicago Press.
- Danielson, Virginia. "Umm Kulthūm". Grove Music Online. Oxford Music Online. Oxford University Press. Web. 20 July 2016.
- "Umm Kulthoum". Al-Ahram Weekly. 3–9 February 2000. Archived from the original on 29 August 2006. Articles and essays marking the 25th anniversary of the singer's death.
- "Umm Kulthum: The Voice of Egypt". Weekend Edition Sunday. NPR. 11 May 2008. Profile of Umm Kulthum and her music.
- "Adhaf Soueif on Um Kulthum". Great Lives. BBC Radio 4. 22 November 2002.
- "Oum Kalsoum exhibition at the Institute Du Monde Arabe, Paris, France". Archived from the original on 8 September 2009. from Tuesday, 17 June 2008 to Sunday, 2 November 2008
- "Umm Kulthum lyrics and English translation". Arabic Song Lyrics. Archived from the original on 8 February 2021.
- Murat Özyıldırım, Arap ve Turk Musikisinin 20. yy Birlikteligi, Bağlam Yay. (Müzik Bilimleri Serisi, Edt. V. Yildirim), Istanbul Kasım 2013.
