= Ibrahim Nagi =

Egyptian poet

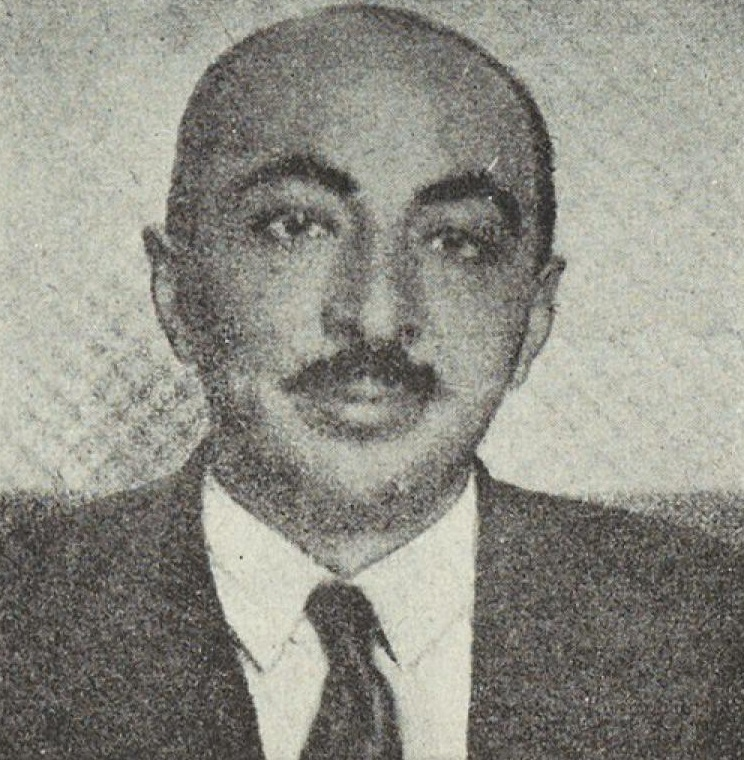
- Ibrahim Nagi
- Born: December 31, 1898; Cairo, Egypt
- Died: March 27, 1953 (aged 54); Cairo, Egypt
- Occupations: Poet, Medical Doctor
- Writing career
- Language: Arabic
- Literary movement: Neo-romanticism, "Apollo Society"

Ibrahim Nagi (Arabic: إبراهیم ناجي) (December 31, 1898 – March 27, 1953) was an Egyptian polymath; a poet, author, translator, and practicing medical doctor. He was among the contributors of Al Siyasa, newspaper of the Liberal Constitutional Party.

== Early life ==
Nagi was also a doctor in internal medicine. Nagi's most famous poem is Al-Atlal or The Ruins which was eventually sung by Egyptian singer Om Kalthoom. He was a co-founder of the Cairo "Apollo Society" for Romantic Poetry. He married Samia Sami and had three daughters: Amira (who had a daughter, Samia Mehrez, and a son, Mohammed), Dawheya (who went to live in America and had a son- Ahmad, and a daughter- Shahira), and Mohassen.

== Bibliography ==
- Behind the Fog, 1934.
- In the Temple of the Night, 1948.
- Cairene Nights, 1951.
- The Bird Wounded, 1953.

== The legacy of Ibrahim Nagi in the literary studies ==
The poetry of Ibrahim Nagi is an object of studies of several literary critics. Nagi's legacy was noted by Abdul Rahman Ghazi al Gosaibi, Hasan Tawfiq and Saleh Jawdat.
