= Dananir al-Barmakiyya =

Arab female poet of Abbasid period

Dananir al-Barmakiyya دنانير البرمكية
- Died: c. 810s Baghdad
- Resting place: Baghdad
- Occupations: Arabic poet and singer
- Writing career
- Language: Arabic
- Period: Islamic Golden Age (Abbasid era)

Dananir al-Barmakiyya (Arabic: دنانير البرمكية; late 8th-century – early 9th-century) was an Arabian qiyan musician, singer and poet. She is also known as the composer of the famous Kitab mujarrad al-aghani (Abridged Book of Songs).

She was from Medina. A slave, she was sold to Yahya ibn Khalid al-Barmaki. As a young slave, she was trained to become a qiyan. She was a student of the qiyan-musician Badhl, who was known for the number of songs she retained in her memory. Among her instructors were Ibrahim and Ishaf al-Mawsili, Ibn Jami, Fulaih, and Badhl.

Dananir is noted as one of the most famous quian-musicians. She is described as an accomplished poet, musician and singer. As a singer, she was popular with the Abbasid Caliph Harun al-Rashid (r. 786–809), who visited his minister's house in Baghdad to hear her perform, and gave her extravagant gifts, including a necklace worth 30,000 gold coins.
