= Inta Omri =

1965 song by Umm Kulthum

Single by Umm Kulthum
- Language: Egyptian Arabic
- Released: February 1964
- Genre: Egyptian Music
- Length: 59:11
- Label: Sono Cairo Records
- Composer: Mohamed Abdel Wahab
- Lyricist: Ahmad Shafik Kamel

"Inta Omri" (Egyptian Arabic: إنت عمري; also transliterated as Enta Oumri, Inta Omry, or Ente Omry) is a popular Egyptian song by Umm Kulthum. It was released in March 1965 by Sono Cairo Records.

== Composition and legacy ==
The song (literally "You Are My Life") was composed by prominent Egyptian musician Mohamed Abd Elwahab with lyrics by Egyptian poet Ahmad Shafik Kamel. It has been sung by many singers including Egyptian singer Amal Maher, whose voice is considered one of the closest to Umm Kulthum's. It is composed in maqam Kurd, which is usually used to portray feelings of freedom, romance, and gentleness.

== See also ==
- List of best-selling singles by country
