= Tarab =

Arabic concept for emotional state caused by music or recitation

Tarab (Arabic: طرب, lit. 'enchantment') is a concept of Arab culture that refers both to a heightened state of consciousness, an intensely pleasant experience or an intense state of emotion accompanied by awareness of a musical or poetic performance. Further, tarab has been applied to a style of music and musical performance in which such emotional states are evoked. Similar to the Western notion of ecstasy, tarab is a subjective experience of total involvement of the audience with the musical performance.

As there is no word in any western language that adequately renders this complex concept, scholars of Arab culture have published various descriptions for the emotional effects of Arabic music that have been associated with tarab as a psychological state that defines this kind of artistic musical performance and its reception by receptive audiences.

== Ethnomusicological and sociocultural definitions ==
=== Definitions and descriptions ===
The New Grove Dictionary of Music and Musicians defined tarab as "a state of heightened emotion or ecstasy felt by musicians and audience that is central to Arab music performance. Within tarab culture, performer and audience are bound by a "common emotional experience to which both contribute."

Commenting on Arabic music in the US, Kenneth S. Habib noted that tarab "refer[s] both to the feeling of enchantment or ecstasy produced by captivating music and to such music itself. While tarab refers to musical experience, it is also mutually reinforced in an active performer–audience dynamic, where "performers express themselves musically and audience members respond in affirming ways."

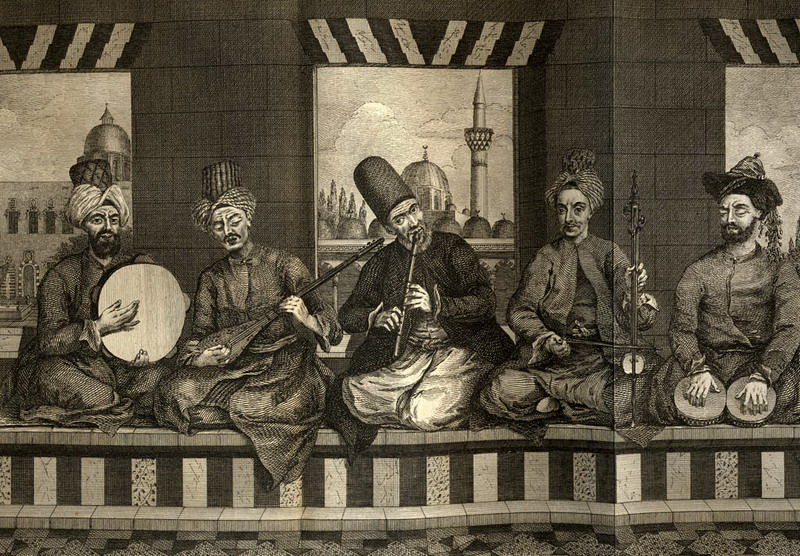
Musicians in Ottoman Aleppo, Syria, mid 18th century

In 2003, Ali Jihad Racy, a musician and professor of ethnomusicology at the University of California, Los Angeles, published his study Making music in the Arab world: the culture and artistry of tarab. He described tarab as "a multifaceted concept that has no exact equivalent in English and refers to both the indigenous music and the ecstatic feeling associated with it." In Arab culture, tarab represents the deep connection between music and emotional experience. The term, found in medieval writings and still used today, refers broadly to the urban, structured classical music of the Arab Near East. Closely linked to the concept of fann ("art"), tarab can denote both this musical tradition and, more specifically, an older repertoire from pre-WWI Egypt and the Eastern Mediterranean, especially associated with stirring emotional responses.

Further, Racy explained that tarab has been described as a "musically induced state of ecstasy", as "enchantment", "aesthetic emotion" and “the feeling roused by music". Accordingly, the ecstasy of tarab involves intense emotional states in the listener, such as excitement, yearning, and timeless delight. It may also induce an altered state of consciousness, such as feelings linked to intoxication, empowerment, inspiration, and creativity.

=== Role of the audience ===
Tarab has been viewed as a specialized cultural domain in society. It refers to a repertory, style and performance practice with certain influences from the art music of Turkey and used to be "patronized by the Egyptian aristocracy and the urban upper class." Sometimes referred to as ‘alam al-tarab ("the world of tarab"), this domain encompasses artists, repertoires, music-related ideologies, attitudes, and behaviours, including ways of listening and reacting to music. The world of tarab includes the audience, particularly the listening connoisseurs. The performers and their public are interconnected in social and emotional ways.

Because of their intensity and private character, tarab sensations are usually conveyed through metaphors, similes, and analogies. The experience of tarab is typically personal and shaped by its context. As a form of ecstatic emotion, it usually arises in particular social settings that are "separate from the flow of ordinary daily life." This intimate character is also reflected in discussions about performance, musical analysis and visible physical or emotional reactions to the music.

As an important historical aspect of Arabic musical and poetic culture, tarab has been tied to urban life, with roots in cities such as Cairo, Beirut, Aleppo and Damascus. Its performers typically come from these urban areas or have spent significant time in these centres, where tarab evolved as a refined musical tradition. Following World War II, increased urbanization, the spread of Arabic music through mass media, and the influence of Cairo's musical style on other cities greatly broadened both the practice and popularity of the appreciation through tarab in eastern Mediterranean music.

=== Musicians known for inducing tarab ===
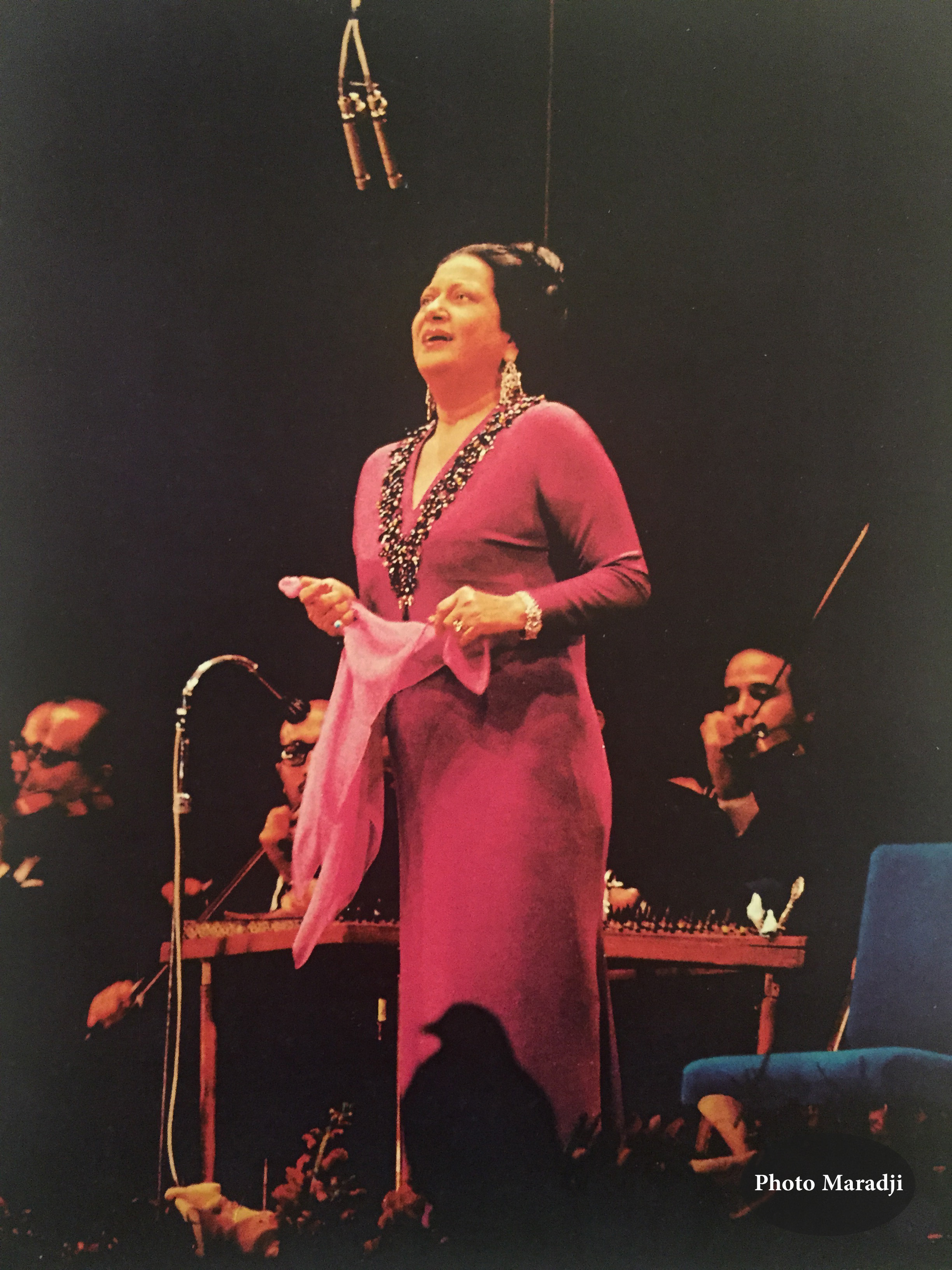
Umm Kulthum, 1968 in Rabat

In her performances at times lasting up to five hours, the Egyptian singer Umm Kulthum would repeat a single line or stance over and over, subtly altering the emotive emphasis and intensity and exploring one or various modal scales (maqām), transporting her audiences into the euphoric and ecstatic state of tarab. Her exceptional vocal control enabled her to lengthen phrases and subtly vary tone and projection with great artistry. She used these abilities to convey the emotional depth of poetic texts, with her listeners experiencing tarab as a "state of rapturous enchantment, where time and self dissolve in the music." Through her art, she established the presence of women in classical Arabic music and enriched the longstanding Arab tradition of performing poetry through her performances.

Referring to the early works of Egyptian musician Mohammed Abdel Wahab, scholars noted that he employed little "spontaneous ornamentation and improvisation", both elements of traditional tarab style during the 20th century. Other notable musicians known for inducing tarab through their music are Abdel Halim Hafez, Sayed Darwish, Sabah Fahri, Sabri Mudallal, Wadih El Safi and Fairuz, among many others.

=== In religious musical experience ===
The term tarab has also been used by ethnomusicologists to indicate states of consciousness that are mystically oriented. Commenting on the emotion of religious trance (wajd) accompanied by music, movement or chanting, the Oxford Encyclopedia of the Islamic World writes: "For Ṣūfī Islam, both the music that acts upon the listener and the act of musical listening are considered samāʿ, as opposed to secular music, which is given various names (and is still considered capable of bringing about a certain ecstasy, or tarab)."

=== Tarab strings in Indian music ===
In Indian music, tarab strings are sympathetic strings of string instruments such as the sitar, sarangi, and similar instruments.

== See also ==
- Arab tone system
- Arabic maqam
- Duende
- Mawwal
- Taarab (Swahili musical genre)
- Taqsim

== Literature ==
- Kahel, Darin (2021). ""Music is Feeling" Tarab: a Phenomenon of Arab Musical Culture" (PDF). DiVA (open archive).
- Shannon, Jonathan H. (2003). "Emotion, Performance, and Temporality in Arab Music: Reflections on tarab". Cultural Anthropology. 18 (1): 72–98. doi:10.1525/can.2003.18.1.72. ISSN 0886-7356. JSTOR 3651584.
- Danielson, Virginia (1997). The Voice of Egypt: Umm Kulthum, Arabic Song, and Egyptian Society in the Twentieth Century. University of Chicago Press.
- Touma, Habib Hassan (1996). The Music of the Arabs, trans. Laurie Schwartz. Portland, Oregon: Amadeus Press. ISBN 0-931340-88-8
- Frishkopf, Michael (1995). “Tarab in the Mystic Sufi Chant of Egypt.” Asian Music 27, no. 1, pp: 1–55.
- Tarab: Music, Ecstasy, Emotion, and Performance (2025). Edited by Michael Frishkopf, Scott Marcus and Dwight Reynolds. Austin: University of Texas Press.
