= Ahmed Rami (poet) =

Egyptian poet

Ahmed Ramy
- أحمد رامى
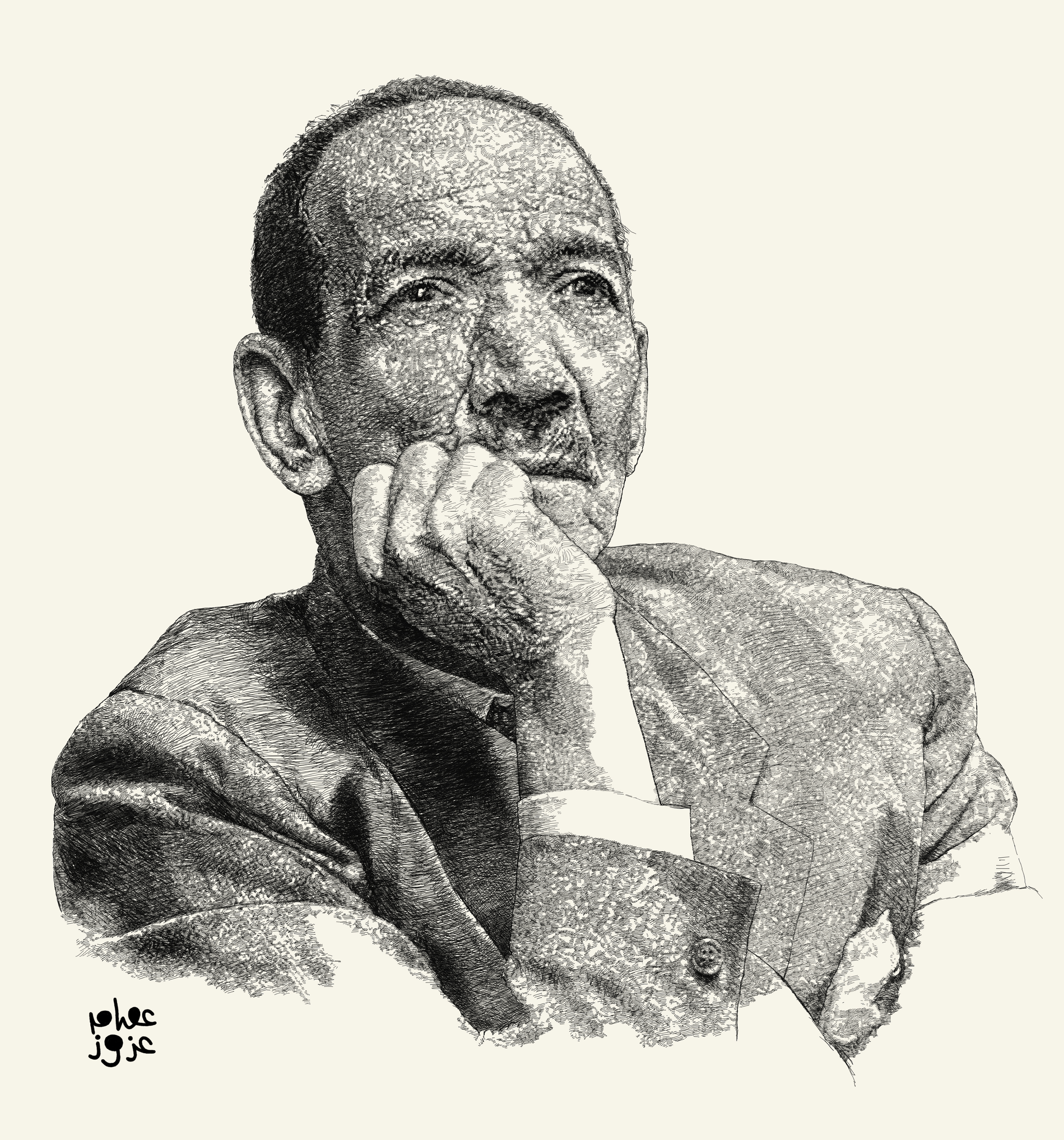
- Born: August 9, 1892; Cairo, Egypt
- Died: June 5, 1981 (aged 88)
- Occupation: poet

Ahmed Ramy (Arabic: أحمد رامى) (August 9, 1892 - June 5, 1981) (also transliterated Ahmad Ramy) was an Egyptian poet, songwriter and translator. He is best known for writing lyrics for the Egyptian singers Umm Kalthoum and Mohammed Abdel Wahab. Ramy was also a translator. His works include translations of several of Shakespeare's plays and the quatrains of the Persian poet Omar Khayyám. Ramy also played a leading role in developing Arabic poetry, using simple language to express sublime themes. He was named "Poet of the youth" in recognition of his contributions to Arabic verse.

== Early life ==
Ahmed Ramy was born in Cairo’s Nasiriyya district on 9 August 1892 into a middle-class Egyptian family. His father was then a medical student at Qasr al-’Ayni and later became a Palace doctor. Ahmed spent the early years of his childhood with his father on the island of Thasos, which belonged to Khedive Abbas II; he returned to Cairo in 1901 to live with his aunt. He attended the Muhammadiyya Elementary and the prestigious Khedive Secondary Schools in Cairo. At this period, Ramy attended weekly poetic forums and started developing his poetic talent. He wrote his first poem when he was 15 years old and began to express his response to political events in his poems. His first published poem appeared in 1910 in Al-Rewaiat Al-Gadida magazine. After graduating from the Higher Teachers College in 1914, Ramy was appointed teacher of geography and English language in private schools in Sayyida Zaynab and then at al-Qurabiyya and al-Munira. It was at this time that he first made acquaintance of the poets and artists of his time, such as Abdel Halim El Masri, Ahmed Shawqi, Ahmed Nassim and Hafez Ibrahim. Six years later, he was appointed a librarian at the Higher Teachers Library, which offered him a unique opportunity to read Arabic, English and French poetry and literature. In 1918, Ramy published his first diwan, which introduced to Arab readers a new type of poetry.

== Career ==
In 1924, Ramy took a scholarship and was sent to Paris on an educational mission where he received a licence en lettres in Persian from the École des Langues Orientales Vivantes. The Persian language diploma helped him in translating the famous Omar Khayyám Quatrain from the original Persian version to Arabic. His translation was so adequate that it reflected Khayyám’s philosophy. In 1925, he worked as a librarian at Dar al-Kutub, Egyptian National Library and Archives, where he applied the modern techniques of librarianship he learned in France to organize the library. He also published his second and third collections of poetry in 1925. After working for Dar al-Kutub for 13 years, in 1938, Ramy worked for the League of Nations Library in Geneva as a librarian after Egypt officially joined the League. In 1945, he returned to Egypt where he worked as an advisor to the Egyptian Broadcast House. He returned to Dar al-Kutub as a Deputy Chairman three years later. Ramy was named vice president of the Dar al-Kutub Board in 1948 and literary adviser to the Egyptian State Broadcasting in November 1954. He contributed to al-Hilal between 1936 and 1954 and wrote plays for both the stage and the screen. During his career, Ahmed Ramy won a large number of awards and orders of merit. In 1965, he received the State Prize for Literature and was granted Intellectual Excellence Order by King Hassan II of Morocco. He won the State Order of Merit in literature in 1967. An honorary doctorate was given to him from the Academy of the Arts in 1976. He was granted a prestigious Lebanese order of merit, and the Paris-based Composers Association gave him a memorial plaque in recognition of his contributions.

== Relationship with Umm Kulthum ==
Rami influenced the legendary Egyptian singer Umm Kulthum, who sang around 200 of his songs. He was introduced to Umm Kulthum in 1924 after his return to Cairo from studies in Paris. She described him as a spiritual combination of inspired feelings, deep suppressed revolution, tranquility and devotion. He wrote a poem for her, "If I Forget", which became her first recording. Lebanese author and journalist Sélim Nassib released a novel, Oum (English title: I Love You for Your Voice), focused on the relationship between Rami and Umm Kulthum in 1996.
