= Bayram al-Tunisi =

Egyptian poet

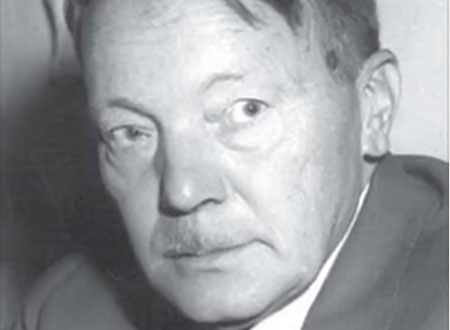
- Bayram al-Tunisi
- Born: Mahmud Muhammad Mustafa Bayram; 1893; Alexandria, Egypt
- Died: 1961 (aged 67–68)
- Occupations: Poet, writer, journalist

Bayram al-Tunisi (بيرم التونسي) (born in 1893 in Alexandria, Egypt as Maḥmūd Muḥammad Muṣṭafā Bayram (محمود محمد مصطفى بيرم) - died 1961), was an Egyptian poet with Tunisian roots. He was exiled from Egypt by the British for his Egyptian nationalist poetry.

== Early life ==
Born and raised in Alexandria, al-Tunisi was nevertheless considered a "foreigner" due to his father's Tunisian origin and he was exiled from Egypt from 1919 to 1938 and was finally granted Egyptian citizenship in 1954.

== Education ==
Bayram received his education at an Islamic religious school in Egypt. However, he learned the pure Arabic art of poetry by listening to oral presentations in the form known as zajal. In 1919, the year of the first Egyptian revolution, he began to publish his poetry in the journal Issues. These satirical ballads, based on the traditional zajal form, were critical of both the British occupation to Egypt and the Egyptian monarchy, which was referred to as a puppet. This led to his exile from Egypt his land of birth, which he spent in France and Tunisia, and then asked the Egyptian kingdom for his return and ending his exile. Al-Tunisi returned to Egypt in 1938, where he continued to publish his Egyptian political poetry.

== Career ==
Bayram coined the term ʾadab al-ʾisʿāf (أدب الإسعاف) (the "literature of rescue") to describe "the successful rejection of external threats, the reorientation and redistribution of power in society, and construction of a strong and independent nation."

In addition to zajal, of which Bayram al-Tunisi was considered a master, he was proficient with maqama which he preferred in much of his later output. Among those who have been influenced by Bayram were Salah Jahin and Ahmed Fouad Negm.

== See also ==
- Lists of Egyptians
