= Zakariyya Ahmad =

Egyptian musician and composer

- زكريا أحـمـد
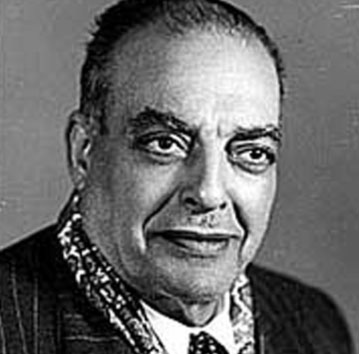
- Born: 1896; Faiyum, Egypt
- Died: 1961 (aged 64–65); Cairo, Egypt
- Occupation(s): Composer, musician

Zakariyya Ahmad (Arabic: زكريا أحمد; born 1896 in Faiyum, Egypt –1961) was an Egyptian musician and composer. He mainly sang religious songs as a member of several groups from 1919 to 1929, having studied recitation of the Qur'an under the well-known Egyptian Quranic reciter Mohamed Salama. He became well-known, however, when he expanded his repertory into popular music, especially those expressing patriotism for the new nation-state of modern Egypt.

The composition style of the majority of his music is heavily influenced by the traditional styles of Egyptian folk music. Well-known works include solo pieces and film scores, and in 1931 he began composing sentimental and Egyptian patriotic songs for Umm Kulthum. He also began writing operettas in 1924, eventually producing a total of 56 operettas and 1,070 songs.

His father was Egyptian and his mother was Turkish, and influenced his early interest in music.
