= Mohammed Abdel Wahab =

Egyptian singer, actor and composer (1902–1991)

Mohammed Abdel Wahab ON OME ORE
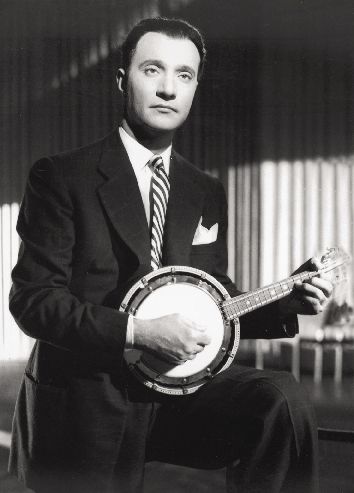
- Mehammad Abdelwahab with a mandolin

Background information
- Born: March 13, 1902; Cairo, Egypt
- Origin: Egypt
- Died: May 4, 1991 (aged 89) Cairo, Egypt
- Genres: Egyptian music, Tarab
- Occupations: Singer; actor
- Instruments: Vocals; oud
- Years active: 1917–1991
- Label: Mazzika
- Website: www.abdel-wahab.com

Mohammed Abdel Wahab (Arabic: محمد عبد الوهاب), pronounced [moˈħamːæd ˌʕæbd‿el wæˈhæːb]; 13 March 1902 – 4 May 1991), was an Egyptian singer and actor best known for his romantic and Egyptian patriotic songs.

He was known for his Egyptian nationalist and Arab nationalist and revolutionary songs like "O Egypt, Happiness Is Here", "The Call of Duty", "The Greatest Homeland", "The Rising Generation", "Egypt Called Us and We Have Answered", "Tell Egypt", "Patriotism Is My Obligation", "Voice of the Masses", "O Breeze of Freedom", and "Arms from My Country". He also composed the national anthem of Libya, which was adopted from 1951 to 1969, and again since 2011.

== Biography ==
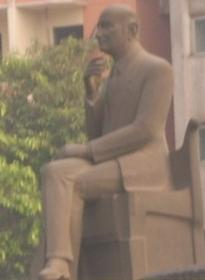
Egyptian singer and composer Mohammed Abdel Wahab Statue at Bab El-Shariya square, Cairo

Mohamed Abdel Wahab was born in 1902 in Cairo, Egypt, in a neighborhood called Bab El-Sheriyah, where there is now a statue of him. He began his singing career at an early age and made his first public performances at age seven at local productions. He was 13 when he made his first recording. Mohamed Abdel Wahab was a very close friend to compatriot singer Abdel Halim Hafez.

== Film career ==
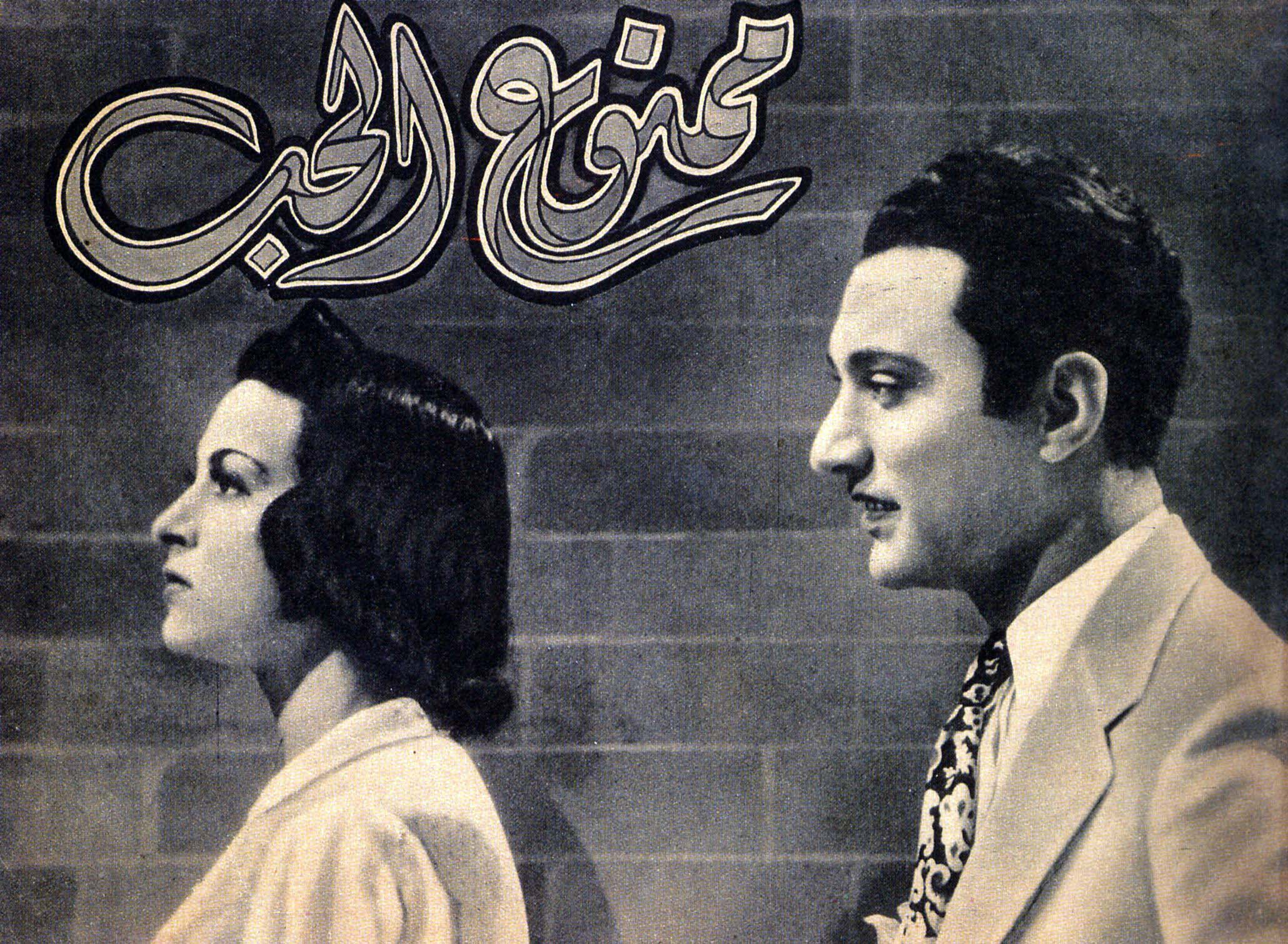
Publicity still for the Egyptian film Mamnou'a el hub (1942).

In 1933, Abdel Wahab began composing his own style of Egyptian film musical after visiting Paris and familiarizing himself with French musical film. He introduced a lighthearted genre of musical film to Egyptian culture eventually composing eight musical comedies between 1933 and 1949. His films portrayed Western social elite and included music that veered off from the traditional Egyptian tune. He starred in his 1933 film The White Rose which broke records in attendance and still plays frequently in Egyptian theaters. In 1950 Abdel Wahab left film to focus on being a more profound singer.

== Contribution to Egyptian and Arabic music ==
Abdel Wahab composed more than 1820 songs. Abdel Wahab is considered to be one of the most innovative Egyptian musicians of all time, laying the foundation for a new era of Egyptian music with his use of non-local rhythms and refined oud playing.

Egyptian President Gamal Abdel Nasser awarding Abdel Wahab the Order of the Republic in 1965.

Despite the fact that Abdel Wahab composed many songs and musical pieces of classical Arabic music, he was notably criticized for his orientation to Western music. In fact, he introduced Western rhythms to Egyptian songs in a way appropriate to the known then very classical forms of Egyptian songs. For example, in 1941, he introduced a waltz rhythm in his song "El Gandol," and, in 1957, he introduced a rock and roll rhythm in Abdel Halim Hafez's song "Ya Albi Ya Khali". In 1950s, he also produced a Palestinian nationalist song, "Akhi Jawiz Alzaalimun Almadaa" (Brothers, the oppressors has gone to far).

He composed some of the best hits of Nagat El Saghira, including four poems by Nizar Qabbani.

Abdel Wahab played oud before the prominent Egyptian poet, Ahmed Shawqi, and acted in several movies. He composed ten songs for Umm Kulthum. He was the first Egyptian singer to move from silent-era acting to singing.

Abdel Wahab also composed songs for the Lebanese icon Fairuz whom he famously called "Our Ambassador to the Stars" and stated in 1958 that he was the leader of her fan club in Cairo.

== Death ==
Mohamed Abdel Wahab died in his hometown Cairo, Egypt of a stroke on May 4, 1991.

== Legacy ==
Abdel Wahab was fundamental in establishing a new era of Egyptian music in his homeland and across the Arab world. He also left a mark on the Western world by exposing Egyptian music to Western classical and popular traditions.

He composed Libya, Libya, Libya, the Libyan national anthem.

== Tribute ==
On March 13, 2012, Google celebrated his 110th birthday with a Google Doodle.

== Filmography ==
As actor

- The White Rose (1933)
- Doumou' el Hub (Love's Tears) (1936)
- Yahya el hub (Long Live Love) (1938)
- Yawm Sa'id (Happy Day) (1939)
- Mamnou'a el Hub (Love Is Forbidden) (1942)
- Rossassa Fel Qalb (A Bullet in the Heart) (1944)
- Lastu Mallakan (I'm No Angel) (1947)
- Ghazal Al Banat (The Flirtation of Girls) (1949)

== Honours ==
=== Egyptian national honours ===
Ribbon bar	Honour
EGY Order of the Nile – Grand Cordon BAR	Grand Cordon of the Order of the Nile
	Grand Cross of the Order of Merit (Egypt)
	Commander of the Order of the Arab Republic of Egypt

=== Foreign honours ===
Ribbon bar	Country	Honour
	Jordan	Grand Cordon of the Supreme Order of the Renaissance
	Lebanon	Commander of the National Order of the Cedar
Order of the Grand Conqueror (Libya)	Libya	Collar of the National Order of Libya
Order of Lifesaving (Morocco)	Morocco	Commander of the Order of Intellectual Merit
	Oman	First Class of the Order of Oman
SYR Order Merit 1kl rib	Syria	Grand Cordon of Order of Civil Merit of the Syrian Arab Republic
	Tunisia	Grand Cordon of the Order of the Republic of Tunisia
