= List of Sudanese singers =

This is a list of singers and musicians from Sudan, in alphabetical order.

- Salah ibn Al Badiya (1937–2019)
- Al-Nour Al-Jilani (born 1944)
- Mahmoud Abdulaziz (1967-2013)
- Sharhabil Ahmed (born 1935)
- Nancy Ajaj (born 1979)
- Hafiz Abdulrahman (died 2023)
- Alsarah (born 1982)
- Mohammed al Amin (1943-2023)
- Mohamed Badawi (born 1965)
- Al Balabil
- Ramey Dawoud (born 1991), Sudanese-American singer
- Aisha al-Falatiya (1905-1974)
- Gawaher (born 1969)
- Omer Ihsas (born 1958)
- Emmanuel Jal (born 1980), also connected to South Sudan and Kenya
- Abdel Karim Karouma (1905-1947)
- Abdel Aziz El Mubarak (1951-2020)
- Khojali Osman (died 1994)
- Rasha (born 1971)
- Ayman al-Rubo (date of birth unknown)
- Abdel Gadir Salim (1946–2025)
- Mostafa Sid Ahmed (1953–1996)
- Mohammed Wardi (1932–2012)
- Mazin Hamid (born 1992)
- Abdel Karim al Kabli (1932-2021)
- Kamal Tarbas (born 1950)
- Hanan al-Neel

== Lyricists ==
- Elhadi Adam (1926–2006)
- Ramey Dawoud (born 1991)

== See also ==
- Music of Sudan
