= Hanan Bulu Bulu =

Sudanese female singer (born 1966)

- Born: Hanan Abdallah Abdelkarim; 4 May 1966 (age 60); Omdurman, Sudan
- Genre: Sudanese music
- Occupation: singer, composer, music producer
- Years active: 1980–present

Hanan Bulu Bulu (Arabic: حنان بلوبلو, born as Hanan Abdallah Abdelkarim, 4 May 1966, Omdurman, Sudan), is a modern Sudanese singer-songwriter and recording artist. In her music, she combines both songs by older Sudanese musicians as well as her own compositions. Her songs are characterized by modern arrangements ٫ played by her own band of professional musicians, and she enjoys wide popularity in Sudan as well as abroad.

== Personal life and artistic career ==
Hanan Bulu Bulu was born in Omdurman, one of the three cities that make up the metropolitan area of Greater Khartoum. Singing many popular songs about her country, she has produced several albums and music videos. In 1986, she was one of the few female singers who appeared in modern Western outfits, even without the headscarf that was obligatory during the government of Omar al Bashir up to 2019. Before the abolishment of Public Order Law, the authorities had imposed many restrictions for women's appearance in public.

In the Rough Guide to World Music, she was mentioned along other Sudanese women singers of the 20th century, such as the pioneer of Sudanese music Aisha al-Falatiya and the internationally successful musical group Al-Balabil. As the "Madonna of 1980s Sudanese pop", she was enjoying popularity with her upbeat style that combined suggestive lyrics and dalooka-style rhythms with the erotic bridal "dove-dance" of Sudanese weddings. An earlier version of the same guide reported that in 1986, she impressed audiences at the Khartoum International Fair.

Encouraged by her popular recognition, she ran for the chairmanship of the General Sudanese Union for Music Professions, the association of Sudanese singers, but was not elected. With the emergence of the fundamentalists' regime in the late 1980s, she suffered persecution, was beaten up, publicly slurred, and banned from performing. For some time, she continued to make music under these difficult conditions, but in 1993 she fled the country.

== Recordings ==
On the compilation album Two Niles to Sing a Melody with songs by famous Sudanese musicians of the 1970s, she was featured with her song "Alamy Wa Shagiya" (My Pain and Suffering).

In 2021, she continued performing with her son, the singer Mohammed Bashir.

== See also ==
- Music of Sudan
- List of Sudanese singers
- Al Balabil (musical group)
