= Kamal Tarbas =

Sudanese singer-songwriter

- Born: Kamal Ibrahim Suleiman; 1 January 1950 (age 75); Omdurman
- Origin: Sudan
- Genres: Music of Sudan, Arabic music, Music of Africa
- Occupation: singer-songwriter
- Years active: 1967-present

Kamal Ibrahim Suleiman, better known as Kamal Tarbas, (Arabic: كمال ترباس, born 1 January 1950, Omdurman, Sudan) is a Sudanese singer-songwriter. He has contributed to the development of popular music in Sudan in the 1970s by his personal, down-to-earth way of singing, backed by orchestras with western musical instruments.

== Life and artistic career ==
Tarbas grew up in an Islamic mystical environment and started working as a carpenter. Starting his career as a singer in the late 1960s, he developed his own Sudanese musical sub-genre, known as "al-fann al-shaabi" (the people's art) that has been described as "earthy populism" and down-to-earth. Further, he became known during the "Golden Years" of popular music in Sudan as "King of Sudanese Folk" music for his "laid-back voice," accompanied by Sudanese tom-tom rhythms and orchestras with western musical instruments.

After a military coup in 1989, the imposition of sharia law by the Islamist government of Omar al-Bashir brought about the closing of music halls and outdoor concerts, as well as many other restrictions for musicians and their audiences. Despite this development, Tarbas has appeared on stage in support of Sudanese football teams and with other popular singers, such as Mohammed al Amin. He has continued to perform both at home in Sudan and in the Gulf Emirate of Abu Dhabi up to the present.

On the compilation album Two Niles to Sing a Melody with songs by famous Sudanese musicians of the 1970s, he was featured with his song "Min Ozzalna seebak seeb" (Whoever humiliated us will cry). Another of his popular songs is "Gana El Baby" written by poet Othman Awad that likens his beloved to a papaya fruit.

Further, he founded the Dar Karouma Centre for Music, named after the Sudanese musical pioneer Abdel Karim Karouma, in 1985. Also, Tarbas is known for his distinctive style of appearing on stage dressed in elegant abaya cloaks and large sized white turbans, measuring up to 9 meters. For this appearance and "shameful" personal conduct, he was criticized by members of the Union of Sudanese Musicians after a meeting in 2015.

== Selected discography ==
Albums

- 1985: Ya kamar Bain
- 1985: Gana El Baby

Singles

- Hban Qsay
- Ma Mank
- Ashan Baridk
- Gay Tftsh Al Mady
- Sayek Dalaloh
- Tany
- Nseem Shabal

== See also ==
- Music of Sudan
- List of Sudanese singers
