= Shaden Gardood =

Sudanese singer and peace activist (1986–2023)

Shaden Gardood شادن قردود

Background information
- Also known as: al-Hakama Shaden
- Born: Shaden Muhammad al-Hassan; 1986; El Obeid, North Kordofan, Sudan
- Died: 13 May 2023 (aged 36–37) El Hashmab, Omdurman, Sudan

Shaden Muhammad al-Hassan (1986 – 13 May 2023), also known as Shaden Gardood or al-Hakama Shaden, was a Sudanese singer and peace advocate who was killed during the Sudanese civil war.

== Biography ==
=== Early life and education ===
Shaden Muhammad al-Hassan was born in El Obeid, North Kordofan, Sudan in 1986. She studied economics at Omdurman Ahlia University, but moved towards performing art, especially the folk and heritage singing of the Kordofan region.

=== Career ===
Gardood advocated for peace and justice through her songs and lyrics. This is why she was also known as "al-Hakama", a title which is given to a group of women in Darfur and Kordofan, who are respected for their poetry and singing. Hakamat have been invited by peacebuilding initiatives in Darfur and also exert power over men in their societies.

Since the outbreak of the conflict, she regularly posted videos and messages on Facebook about the clashes and shelling in her Omdurman neighbourhood, and wrote intensively against the war. Gardood had a prominent role in advocating for popular groups opposed to military rule, and had shared her songs with the peaceful demonstrators during the Sudanese Revolution that managed to overthrow the regime of Omar al-Bashir, who ruled the country for three decades. She was present with her songs at the sit-in at the army command, which was organised by hundreds of thousands of demonstrators to demand civil rule, after the fall of Al-Bashir and the seizure of power by the army leaders.

=== Death ===
Gardood died during the Battle of Omdurman at 1am on 13 May 2023. She was on her balcony in the al-Hashmab neighborhood when a bullet, likely from a sniper, shot her below her ribs. Her son and two family members attempted to take her to a hospital, but were delayed by a Sudanese army checkpoint. She lived near the national television and radio building, which saw heavy fighting from the beginning of the conflict. The building was held by the RSF, who were often attacked from the ground and air by the Sudanese Army. Shortly before she died, she posted a video telling her son to stay away from their windows.

== See also ==
- Music of Sudan - The role of women in traditional music
- Asia Abdelmajid
- Omer Ihsas
