= Mostafa Sid Ahmed =

Sudanese songwriter and singer (1953–1996)

Mustafa Sid Ahmad مصطفى سيد احمد
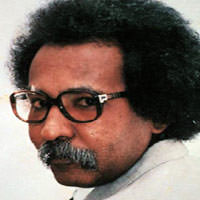

Background information
- Birth name: Mustafa Sid Ahmad Almagbul
- Born: 1953
- Origin: Wad Sulfab, Sudan
- Died: 17 January 1996 (aged 43)
- Genres: Music of Sudan, African Music
- Occupation(s): High-school teacher, singer-songwriter, textile designer
- Instrument(s): singer, Oud, multiple instruments
- Years active: mid 1970's–1996

Mostafa Sid Ahmed (Arabic: مصطفى سيد احمد, 1953 – 17 January 1996), also spelled Mustafa Sayyid Ahmad, was a Sudanese singer-songwriter and composer, active from the late 1970s onwards until his death in 1996. During his lifetime, he released more than a hundred songs. According to an article published during the Sudanese revolution of 2018/19, he was remembered "for performing a selective and expressive type of lyrics that touches upon the causes of ordinary and deprived people."

A former teacher, he studied at the College of Music and Drama in Khartoum and composed his music to the lyrics of well-known Sudanese poets like Mahjub Sharif, often expressing the longing for freedom and the struggle of the Sudanese people against dictatorship.

== Early life ==
Sid Ahmed was born in Wad Sulfab village, Al Jazirah State in central Sudan, close to the town of Al-Hasa Hisa. He had seven sisters and one brother, named Al-Makbool. Al-Makbool had a great influence on him, because his brother was known as a singer and poet. His dramatic death, when he was 27, gave Sid Ahmed a great desire to follow in his brother's career.

Mostafa Sid Ahmed started primary education in Al-Hasa Hisa, close to his home village, and then moved to Port Sudan, the capital of Red Sea state, where he received his secondary education. He first appeared in public as a singer in 1971 at the Teachers Training Institute, but soon quit working as a teacher to concentrate on his musical career.

== Artistic career ==
Sid Ahmed spent four years studying at the College of Music and Drama in Khartoum and graduated in the late 1970s. He is considered the pioneer of a new style of Sudanese singing, because of his poetic style, labelled as sophisticated and as "political singing".

At the start of Sid Ahmed's career, he collaborated with many established singers, writers and poets, but disagreements arose with some of the poets he had been collaborating with. For example, he had a disagreement with one of the poets who wrote the song "Shagga Al-Ayaam" ("The suffering of the days"), and the argument led to a dispute with the entire Sudanese Musicians' Union.

After this, Sid Ahmed chose to collaborate with younger poets. These did not write for songs, and their poetry was often marked by symbolic expressions. This style of poetry dealt with the longing for freedom and the struggle of the Sudanese people against the dictatorship that had become especially oppressive during the latter years of the Ja'far al-Numayri regime from 1979 to the early 1980s. These new poets included Yahia Fadullah, Abu zar Al-gafari, Muhammad Elmahdi Abed Elwahab, Qasim Abu zid, Katab Hassan Ahmad, Salaah Haj Seed. Later, in the late 1980s and 1990s, he collaborated with more poets, including Al-Sadiq Al-Raddi, Muhammad Elhassan Salim Homid, Alkattiabi, Azhari Muhammad Ali, Atif Khiry, Abed Elrahim Abu Zakrra, Madani El-Nakhaly, and Muhammad Ali Shammu.

Sid Ahmed was also known as a poet and composer. When he was afflicted by kidney failure in 1989, he travelled to Russia and underwent surgery there, before moving on to Alexandria and Cairo in Egypt. He subsequently emigrated to Qatar, where he spent the rest of his life and died after a long struggle with kidney failure on 17 January 1996.

During his time in Qatar, Sid Ahmed released many songs, most of which expressed the suffering and struggle of the Sudanese against the regime of Omar al-Bashir. His songs reflected his suffering in exile, sometimes mixed with the struggle against his own physical pain. According to the notes of The Sounds of Sudan, his song "With the Birds" ("مع الطيور"), also known as "Migrating Birds" ("الطيور المهاجرة") or the song "Passport" ("جواز سفر") are some of Mustafa Sid Ahmed's most popular songs.

Another appreciation of his songwriting is expressed in the following quote:

The central subject of his work is the condition of the popular classes, crushed by dictatorships. Likely one of the best-known songs of his repertoire, “‘Amm ‘Abd al-Rahim”, (Uncle Abd al-Rahim) is one example: it tells of the death of a peasant ruined by the expropriation of his lands, who leaves for work in the morning on his chariot pulled by a tired beast. He is absorbed by his thoughts about his family that he loves dearly, but whose needs he is unable to provide for: he thinks of his children’s overly worn clothes, and of his wife’s face as she seeks to console him about their misery. So lost is he in these preoccupations that he fails to hear the sound of the train that crushes him. The song was and remains a symbol of the situation of oppression in which the popular and peasant classes live, and mentioning it was already a means of situating oneself within the political opposition.
- Khadidja Medani and Elena Vezzadini. Leftist Leanings and the Enlivening of Revolutionary Memory. January 1st, 2019

== See also ==
- Music of Sudan
- List of Sudanese singers
