= Aisha Musa =

Aisha Musa may refer to:

- Aisha Musa Ahmad, a Sudanese singer who lived from 1905 to 1974 and was popular in Sudan and Egypt
- Aisha Musa el-Said, a Sudanese academic translator who was nominated to the Sovereignty Council of Sudan in August 2019
