= Mahmoud Abdulaziz =

Sudanese singer-songwriter (1967-2013)

Mahmood Abdulaziz محمود عبد العزيز
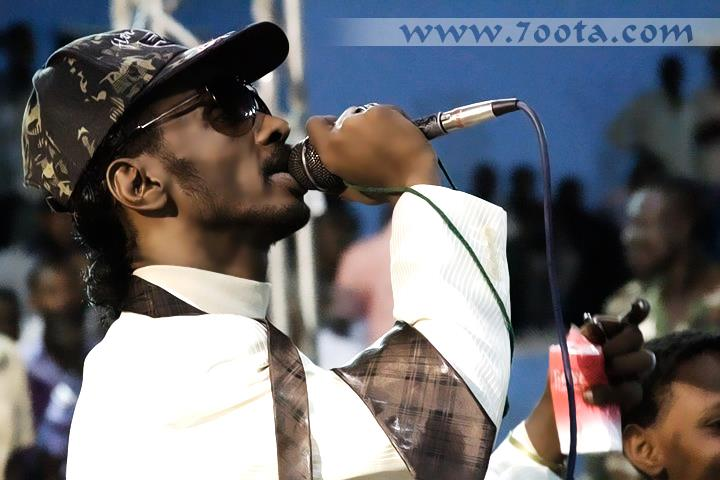

Background information
- Born: 16 October 1967; Khartoum, Sudan
- Died: January 17, 2013 (aged 45); Amman, Jordan
- Genres: Music of Sudan, Arabic, African
- Occupation: singer-songwriter
- Years active: 1994-2013

Mahmoud Abdulaziz (Arabic: محمود عبد العزيز, 16 October 1967 – 17 January 2013, Khartoum, Sudan) also transcribed as Mahmoud Abdel Aziz and affectionately known as Elhoot or Al-hoot (The Whale), was a popular Sudanese singer-songwriter. Called "Sudan's idol of the youth”, he was a central figure for Sudanese music fans, opposing the military government of the day.

== Life and artistic career ==
Mahmoud Abdulaziz was born in the Bahri district of Khartoum in 1967, and died in hospital in Amman in January 2013. His music was a blend of modern urban music from Sudan and Western pop music, with occasional other African influences. Even though his songs were banned on Sudan's national television and radio during the years of Sharia-inspired Public Order Laws, when many singers, artists and politicians had to flee the country, because of conservative religious intolerance against popular music, Abdulaziz stayed in Sudan and continued to perform, risking arrest.

At the time of his death, he had become a symbol for those wanting a more secular and less repressive Sudan. Abdulaziz recorded more than 30 albums, widely available in Sudan on cassette tapes or bootleg CDs. Several of the many YouTube videos with his music have more than one million views. An example for his great popularity is the attendance of several tens of thousands of his fans at the fourth anniversary of his death in Khartoum in January 2017.

== Trivia ==
During a concert, a disabled fan, who could not get as close to the stage as he would have wanted, sought to catch the attention of his idol, and started waving his hands. This worked, and Abdulaziz mimicked his movements, and also came to greet the fan. Later, it became habitual for the artist to greet his devoted fans in this way, at every concert. Subsequently, crossed arms with index fingers pointing outwards became his symbol, and was in turn taken up by other fans. Even on his deathbed, Mahmoud was photographed in this pose.

== Select Discography ==
Albums

- 1994: Khalli Balak
- 1995: Sakat Al-Rabab
- 1996: Jawab lilbalad
- 1996: Seb enadak
- 2001: qaed al istul
- 2002: Fi bali
- 1998: lahib alshoug
- 2000: Noor Alain
- 2000: alaa alnajeela
- 2000: ma tishly ham
- 2001: ash man shafak
- 2001: bartah liek
- 2002: Shail Jarrah
- 2002: Aktubi eli
- 2003: adaat sanna
- 2005: marat alayam
- 2005: saab albalad
- 2005: Khof alwajaa
- 2007: Alhaneen
- 2008: ya zoul ya tieb

== See also ==
- Music of Sudan
- List of Sudanese singers
