= Mohammed Wardi =

Sudanese popular musician

Mohammed Wardi محمد وردي

Background information
- Born: Mohammed Osman Hassan Salih Wardi; 19 July 1932
- Origin: Sawarda, Wadi Halfa, Sudan
- Died: 18 February 2012 (aged 79) Khartoum
- Genres: Music of Sudan, Nobiin, Arabic music
- Occupations: singer-songwriter, teacher
- Instruments: Singing, oud, tanbur, multiple instruments
- Years active: 1957–2012

Mohammed Osman Hassan Salih Wardi (Arabic: محمد عثمان حسن وردي; 19 July 1932 – 18 February 2012), also known as Mohammed Wardi, was a Nubian Sudanese singer, poet and songwriter. He is one of the most famous Sudanese musicians of the 20th century and is considered a cultural icon of modern Sudan, as well as a voice of his country's political and social consciousness.

== Early life ==
Wardi was born on 19 July 1932 in a small village called Sawarda close to Wadi Halfa in Northern Sudan. His mother, Batool Badri, died when he was an infant, and his father, Osman Hassan Wardi, died when he was nine years old. He was brought up in a diverse and culturally rich background and developed an interest in poetry, literature, music and singing. To complete his education, he moved to Shendi in Central Sudan, and returned to Wadi Halfa as a secondary school teacher.

== Musical career ==
In 1953, Wardi went to Khartoum for the first time to attend a convention as a teaching representative for his area. After this, he moved to Khartoum and started his career as a musical performer. In 1957, Omdurman Radio chose him to record and sing on national broadcast in an arena with singers such as Abdelaziz Mohamed Daoud, Hassan Atia, Ahmed Almustafa, Osman Hussein and Ibrahim Awad. Wardi recorded 17 songs in his first year. and worked together with poet Ismail Hassan, resulting in more than 23 songs.

Wardi's career spanned over 60 years, and he released more than 300 songs. He performed using a variety of instruments, including the Nubian kissar and sang in both Arabic and Nubian languages. He has been described as one of "Africa's top singers", with fans mainly in the Horn of Africa. His songs address topics such as romance, passion, Nubian folklore, heritage, revolution and patriotism, with some of his political songs resulting in him being jailed. He was aligned with the political left and a member of the Sudanese Communist Party (the largest in Africa during the Cold War). After the military coup in 1989, he left Sudan for exile in Cairo and Los Angeles. In 1990, Wardi played a concert for 250,000 Sudanese refugees at a refugee camp in Itang, Ethiopia. He returned to Sudan in May 2002, and was awarded an honorary doctorate from the University of Khartoum in 2005.

== Death ==
Wardi suffered from kidney failure later in his life. He eventually received a kidney transplant, after one of his fans donated a kidney to him in 2002. He died on 18 February 2012 and was buried in the Farouk Cemetery in Khartoum.

== Reception ==
As part of the film score for the award-winning 2025 documentary Khartoum, Wardi’s music was praised by a review for generating a “pulsating sense of optimism, making it clear that Sudan will rise again.”

Looking back at his life and artistic career, Sudanese writer and critic Lemya Shammat called him an "inspirational figure in Sudanese music and culture, whose prolific talent and massive contribution remains unsurpassed in Sudan."

== Poets and songwriters, with whom Wardi collaborated ==
- Abdel-Hadi Osman Ahmed
- Sawi Abdelkafi
- Aljayli Abdelmoneim
- Omer Altayib Ad-dosh – "Banadeha"
- Mubarak Basheer
- Mohamed Muftah Alfaytori
- Ishaq Alhalanqi – "A3z Alnas"
- Ahmed Altahir
- Ibrahim Alrasheed – "Saleem Alzog"
- Abdelrahman Alrayah
- Alsir Dolaib
- Abu Amna Hamid
- Ismail Hassan – "Alhaneen ya Foadi", "Nor Al3en", "Habenak mn Qlobna", "Almostaheel",
- Salah Ahmed Ibrahim – "Altayir Almohajir"
- Mohammed Almakki Ibrahim
- Haile
- Kamal Mahessi – "Jamal Aldoniya"
- Mohammed Abu Qatati – "Almursal"
- Altijani Saeed – "Gult Arhal", " Min Gair Meiad"
- Mahjoub Sharif – "Ya Sha3ban Lahbt thwrtak", "Masajenak", "We Will Build It (The Alternative)" ("حنبنيهو")
- Saadaddin Ibrahim
- Mohammed Abdalla Mohammed Babekir

== See also ==
- Music of Sudan
- List of Sudanese singers
