= Noor al-Jailani =

Sudanese singer (born 1944)

al-Noor al-Jailani النور الجيلاني
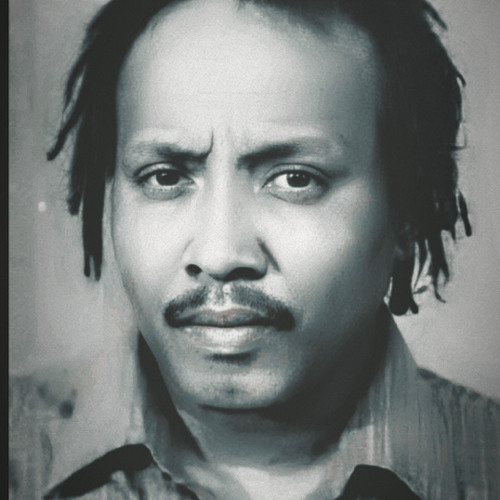

Background information
- Also known as: Tarazn
- Born: Al-Nour Al-Jilani Omar Muhammad Nour; 1944 (age 81–82); Abu Halima, Khartoum North
- Genres: Sudanese Music
- Instruments: Guitar, Mandolin, Goblet drum, Bassoon

Noor al-Jailani (Arabic: النور الجيلاني; born 1944) is a Sudanese singer with a unique lyrical style that combines traditional folk singing with modern music, through topics of various shapes and contents. He sang many songs to South Sudan and loved nature and scenic views. Most of his songs were about the Nile and birds. Al-Nour Al-Jilani is dubbed “Tarzan” for his lyrics and feverish music. He is considered one of the pioneers of music in Sudan and one of its distinguished voices. Among his discography are the forgotten memory, Al-Asfoor, Kadrawih, Fayyan, and Sawah.

== Life and career ==
=== Early life ===
Al-Noor Al-Jilani Omar Muhammad Nour was born in 1944 in the village of Abu Halima, on the outskirts of Khartoum North, Sudan. He attended the Western Shambat Primary School and later the Coptic Middle School, where his singing talents emerged. He excelled in the school artistic activity of singing Hakeeb songs.

=== Musical career ===
In his artistic works, Al-Nour Al-Jilani was influenced by the Sudanese singers Khader Bashir, Othman Al-Shafi’, Sayed Khalifa and Al-Aqib Muhammad Al-Hassan. He started his artistic career in 1968, through a music group in the neighbourhood in which he lived, known as “Group of Su’alik” Arabic: شلة الصعاليك. The beginning of the 1970s witnessed the launch of Al-Jilani to rise as an integrated artist and singer. The Youth Festival of Folk Song in Sudan in 1970 witnessed his first real appearance when he won the first prize in it by presenting his song “Madelina” to the poet Mohamed Saad Diab. In 1977, his star shone as a singer at the age of twenty-two.

Al-Nour Al-Jilani is dubbed “Tarzan” for his lyrics and feverish music.

=== Personal life and (rumoured) death ===
Al-Jilani is married and has one child, Ahmed. He lost his voice and, consequently, hid from the public eyes. He regained his voice for a short period and sang for the anti-government protests during the Sudanese Revolution.

On 29 August 2022, after his health condition had deteriorated, it was heavily rumoured that he had died. However, on 28 January 2023, he was pictured attending an Al-Merrikh SC gala, being honoured by the football club.

== Artistry ==
=== Musical style ===
It is difficult for Sudanese critics and journalists to classify his singing art in terms of music or performance. On the one hand, he used a method that makes his singing approach popular singing, but he sometimes used melodicism that makes the singing closer to jazz music.

In its general melodic features, it is closer to modern singing. It relies mainly on mandolin, organ, guitar and trumpet, along with darbuka and conga percussion instruments, as well as a chorus. The chorus members consisted of three or four individuals, and the artist's voice overlaps with their voices sometimes, then his voice fades, or he sings alone in the absence of their voices. And at other times, he hums when the chorus is singing, or he issues mumbles of sad wailing to give the performance a unique aesthetic. This is all matched by the musical instrument's melodies and the rhythm's speed.

This lyrical experience combines simplicity, strength and cohesion. Thus, it can be said that he is the owner of a lyrical chromaticism that combines the method of ancient popular singing with the colours of modern mirth without deviating from the basics of the music of the Sudanese quintet. Al-Jilani composed most of his songs himself.

=== Songs’ themes ===
The topics of Al-Jilani's songs were varied and distinguished by their quality in terms of form and content. In terms of content, it deals with various issues and addresses specific social groups or age groups, such as children. Perhaps what brings this together is the song “Thoughts of an Elephant” by the poet Hassan Bara, which children perform. It speaks with the tongue of a young elephant who has fallen into captivity, while at the same time, it addresses the problem of animal welfare, and its rights and freedom. The texts of the song call for compassion for the sad elephant who was uprooted from his environment and captivated in a cage for the sake of human amusement.

In terms of form, the texts of his songs are distinguished by the beauty of their style, which is rich in meanings, clarification and puns. The most prominent example of this is the song “Kadrawiyyah”, in which the poet praises the beauty of his beloved Kadrawiyyah, or Al-Kadro in Khartoum Bahri. Singing, ”From heaven to earth, dazzled by her beauty, asks about her name and identity, and a mattress hovers around her, clapping her wings with joy and shouting that she is like a dervish woman.

Al-Jilani also sang of love, human values, lamentation, homeland and unity between north and south. This is embodied in the song "Ya Traveler Juba", which tells the grievances of the northern Sudanese on their way to Juba, the capital of southern Sudan. The song "Vivian", which expresses the condition of a girl from southern Sudan residing in the capital of the north, Khartoum. This song gave a great social and political dimension because it gave women in southern Sudan a place within the passion of Sudanese lyric poetry.

=== Legacy ===
Al-Nour Al-Jilani introduced the loud, fast and untrodden rhythms of the central region of Sudan into Sudanese music; thus, he tended to choose the southern dance rhythms such as the bayou rhythm. He also added the element of modernity to the popular song. Sudanese musician Ismail Abdel Moein said about Al-Nour Al-Jilani that he has the second most wonderful voice in the world.
