= Noori and his Dorpa Band =

Sudanese band

- Origin: Port Sudan, Sudan
- Genres: Beja music
- Years active: 2006–present
- Label: Ostinato
- Members: Noori (tambo-guitar); Naji (tenor saxophone); Gaido (bass guitar); Tariq (rhythm guitar); Fox (congas); Danash (tabla)

Noori and his Dorpa Band are a Beja band from Port Sudan, led by musician Noori Jaber. Their debut album Beja Power! Electric Soul & Brass From Sudan's Red Sea Coast was released on Ostinato Records in 2022.

== History ==
Noori Jaber founded Noori and his Dorpa Band in 2006. He leads the group on "tambo-guitar", an instrument he created by attaching the neck of an electric guitar to a kissar that he received as an 18-year old. In an article for the Yearbook for Traditional Music, Jim Hickson described the instrument as "a striking visual symbol of musical fusion."

Ostinato Records owner Vik Sohonie first came across Noori and his Dorpa Band on TikTok during a trip to Sudan in 2021. After being contacted by Sohonie, the group spent five days recording in Omdurman, Khartoum State, and in June 2022 Ostinato Records released the Dorpa Band's debut album Beja Power!.

== Musical style ==
The members Noori and his Dorpa Band are Beja, an ethnic group from eastern Sudan that make up roughly 5% of the population of the country. The Beja have historically been politically and culturally marginalised in Sudan. Omar al-Bashir, who was Sudan's head of state from 1989 to 2019, was intentional in suppressing Beja culture; Noori and his Dorpa Band aim to promote and preserve Beja culture in response to this.

Jim Hickson described the sound of Noori and his Dorpa Band as "clearly Sudanese while bringing to mind Ethiopian, Somali, and Yemeni music", and also as showing influence from Tuareg, blues, and jazz music.

== Members ==
- Noori (tambo-guitar)
- Naji (tenor saxophone)
- Gaido (bass guitar)
- Tariq (rhythm guitar)
- Fox (congas)
- Danash (tabla)

== Discography ==
Albums

- Beja Power! Electric Soul & Brass From Sudan's Red Sea Coast (Ostinato, 2022)
