= Tanbūra (lyre) =

Traditional string instrument

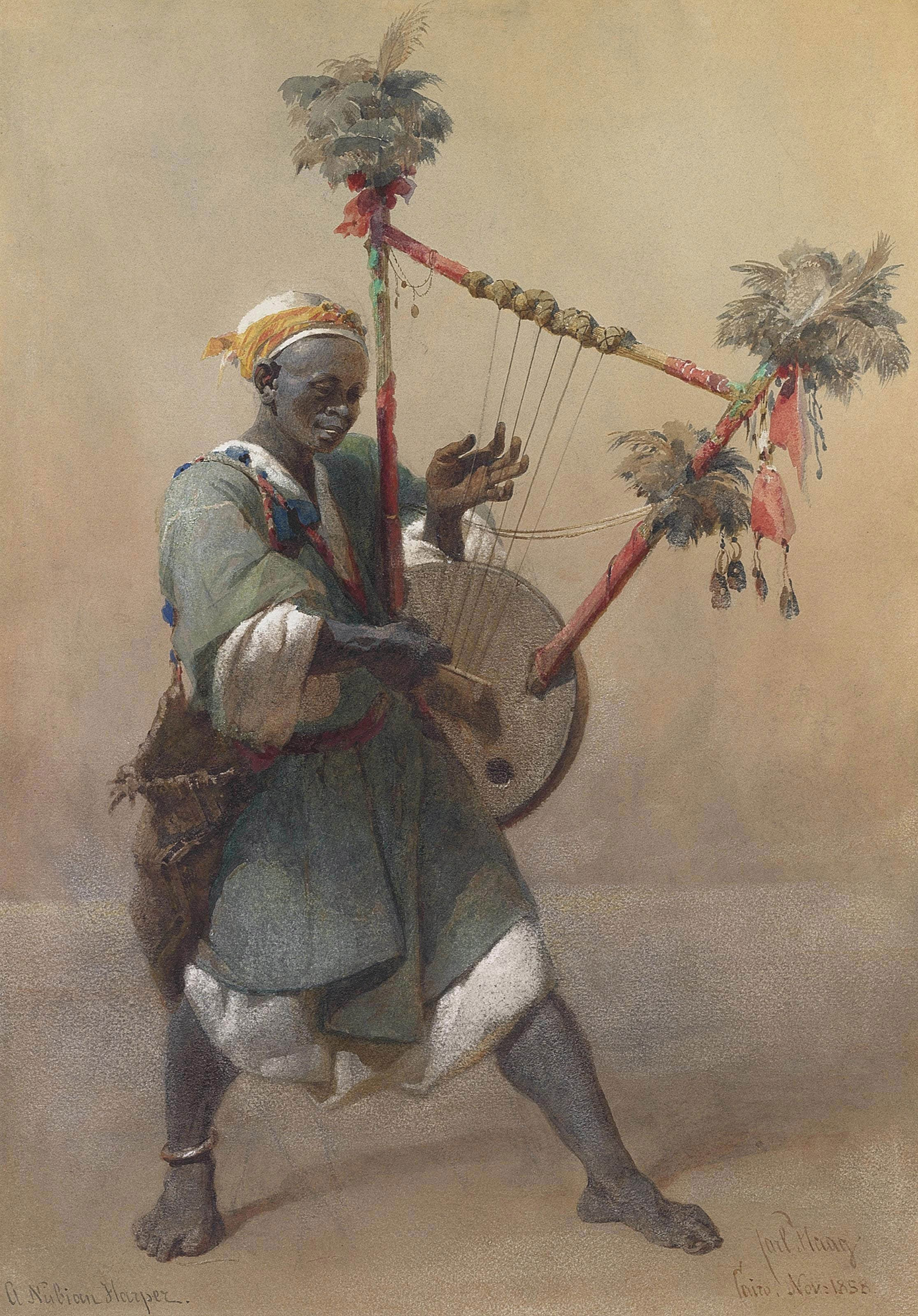
Tanbūra In Cairo, played by a Nubian, 1858

The tanbūra or "Kissar" is a bowl lyre of East Africa and the Middle East. Tanbūra traces its etymology to the Persian tanbur via the Arabic tunbur (طنبور), though this term refers to long-necked lutes. The instrument probably originated in Upper Egypt and the Sudan in Nubia and is used in the Fann At-Tanbura in the Persian Gulf Arab States. It also plays an important role in zār rituals.

The tanbūra is a member of a family of lyres which can be found, with variations, in many areas throughout East Africa: compare the Ugandan Endongo and Kenya Nyatiti. According to ethnomusicologist Christian Poché, the Sudanese style of lyre has been played throughout "Egypt, Sudan, Djibouti, North Yemen, Southern Iraq and the Gulf States."

In Sudan, the tanbūra (or tanbur) The North Sudanese version is typically five-stringed with a larger size. They're decorated with beads, tassels, charms, cowrie shells, plastic fruit, and small mirrors. The tanbur player is called a sanjak, and plays it by holding it with his left hand, aided by the support of a strap. The fingers (and in the case of six-stringed versions, palm) of the left hand rest on the strings from behind. The right holds a plectrum made of bull's horn called a garin. Sound is made by plucking strings with the plectrum and moving fingers to create "free strings" (strings with fingers pressed against them have their sound dampened). The bottom rests on the ground, legs, or arm depending on size (here from biggest to smallest).

== See also ==
- Krar
