= Nancy Agag =

Sudanese singer-songwriter

Nancy Agag نانسي عجاج
- Born: Nancy Ajaj; 2 March 1979 (age 47); Omdurman, Sudan
- Occupations: singer; composer; producer
- Years active: 1999–present
- Musical career
- Genres: Arabic pop; Sudanese music
- Instrument: vocals
- Label: Rotana Records
- Website: www.facebook.com/nancyajajofficialpage/

Nancy Agag, also spelled Nancy Ajaj (Arabic: نانسي عجاج, born 2 March 1979), is a modern Sudanese singer-songwriter and recording artist. In her music, she combines both songs by older Sudanese musicians as well as her own compositions. Her songs are characterised by modern arrangements, played by her own band of professional musicians, and she is known in Sudan as well as abroad.

== Personal life and artistic career ==
Nancy Agag was born in Omdurman and grew up in the Netherlands, where she studied Social History and music. Her father, Badr al-Din Ajaj, also a well-known musician and composer, was murdered, when he returned to Sudan.

From 2004 onwards, Nancy Agag and her band have performed numerous concerts in Sudan, the US, England, Canada, Qatar and the Netherlands. Featuring many popular songs about her country, she has produced several albums and many music videos. In 2016, the German Cultural Centre in Khartoum produced two of her songs for an international project, featuring music videos from Sudan, Egypt and the Middle East.

Nancy Agag was one of the few female singers who appeared in modern Western outfits, even without the headscarf that was obligatory during the government of Omar al Bashir up to 2019. Before the abolishment of Public Order Law, the authorities had imposed many restrictions for women's appearance in public.

During the Sudanese revolution of 2018/19, she published a song called Birth, which according to the selection of Sudanese songs The Sounds of Sudan, expresses the "sentiments of Sudan’s December Revolution".

== see more ==
- Hanan Bulu Bulu

== External links to music videos ==
- "Birth" ("ميلاد") by Nancy Ajaj with English translation and comments on the lyrics
- Ahibak on Al Shoorok TV
- Ahibak from Goethe Institut kitchen sessions
- Andarea
- Hanin
- Al shoog wa al raid
- Show reel 2015 (excerpts from concerts and interviews)
