= Mazin Hamid =

Sudanese musician and music producer

Mazin Hamid مازن حامد
- Born: 2 October 1992 (age 33)
- Origin: Khartoum, Sudan
- Genres: Music of Sudan, Arabic music
- Occupations: Singer-songwriter, music producer
- Instruments: Singing, guitar
- Years active: 2016–present
- Website: Mazin Hamid on Facebook

Mazin Hamid (Arabic: مازن حامد, born 2 October 1992) is a Sudanese musician, composer, music producer and sound engineer. Known mainly through his popular music videos and live performances as singer and guitarist, he also has published music videos with political messages and composed the musical score for the award-winning Sudanese feature film Goodbye Julia.

== Biography and career ==
Hamid graduated from the Department of Engineering, University of Khartoum, but later turned to Sudanese music through his recordings and live performance as singer, guitarist, composer and producer of music videos. He is considered one of the first Sudanese artist to produce a video clip singing multiple vocal tracks for the same song on YouTube. His personal musical identity is known for his contemporary Sudanese pop music style as well as for his "deep vocals and beautiful classical lyrics." He has mostly released original songs and was invited to perform for the Delegation of the European Union in Sudan, among other official occasions.

In 2016, the German Cultural Centre in Khartoum produced his song Al Ghorba Maha Ekhtiyar (Exile is not a choice) for an international project, featuring music videos from Sudan, Egypt and the Middle East. During the COVID-19 pandemic, Hamid organised an online "Together at Home" concert to help people through the pandemic. He has also been involved in initiatives to raise awareness and support causes such as ending female genital mutilation (FGM) in Sudan. Further, Hamid was vocal during the Sudanese Revolution. In 2022, security forces raided his radio studio and took him “with great cruelty” to an unknown destination, and on 14 February 2022, he was released from Soba prison.

In 2022, Hamid created the musical score for the feature film Goodbye Julia, the first Sudanese film to be presented at the Cannes Film Festival. He recorded it during ongoing clashes between the military and civil society in Khartoum. In an interview about the social contrasts he wanted to illustrate by his film and notably the musical score, director Mohamed Kordofani said:

Clearly, through the film’s score, the song producer and composer Mazin Hamid makes us see that instead of spending our lives separated, this is what we could have celebrated. [...] Mona sings a song by a late popular Sudanese singer, Sayed Khalifa in a church, with a composition including African accents. There are numerous songs from North and South Sudan, representing different cultures, and an original song closing the film.

— Mohamed Kordofani, Sudanese film director

== See also ==
- Music of Sudan
