= Mohammed al Amin =

Sudanese popular musician (1943–2023)

Mohammed al Amin محمد الأمين
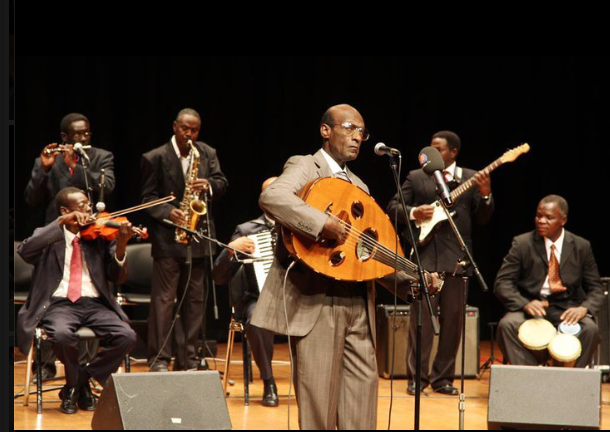
- Mohammed al Amin and his band in concert

Background information
- Born: 20 February 1943; Wad Madani, Anglo-Egyptian Sudan
- Died: 12 November 2023 (aged 80); U.S.
- Genres: Music of Sudan, Arabic music
- Occupation: Singer-songwriter
- Instrument(s): Voice, oud
- Years active: 1963–2023

Mohammed al Amin (Arabic: محمد الأمين; 20 February 1943 – 12 November 2023), sometimes spelled Mohamed Elamin or El Amin, was a Sudanese popular musician noted for his personal style of singing, his playing of the oud, and his often outspoken lyrics. Subjected to political repression by Sudanese governments, he took exile in Cairo in 1989 and only returned to Sudan several years later.

== Life and artistic career ==
Born in Wad Madani, central Sudan, in 1943, al Amin started singing and learning to play the oud at the age of 11, and wrote his first compositions at the age of 20. Throughout his career, he mostly wrote his own lyrics, but at times also used the words of well-known Sudanese poets like Fadlallah Mohamed or Mahjoub Sharif. After the successful revolution of October 1964, he composed the song "The Epic of October".

Several times, his patriotic and critical songs evoked the suspicion of the military dictatorships of the day, and he was jailed by Nimeiri's regime in the 1970s. To avoid further trouble, he moved to Cairo after the military coup in 1989. In 1994, he returned to Khartoum and kept a low profile, despite his great popularity that led him to appear in concerts in the United Arab Emirates, Europe, China or the US.

In his study "Framing Political Content in Sudanese Popular Songs", Mohamed A. Satti cites al Amin's song Raja' al balad (He returned home) as an example of allegiance of a Sudanese in exile and of his belonging to the nation, even after an absence of many years. - A more personal insight into his lyrics, speaking about domestic scenes that could have happened in any country, is presented in the song al jarīda - (The Newspaper) from his album Voice of Sudan, recorded after a concert in Berlin, Germany, in 1993.

"You seem distracted my love, absent-minded, lost in thought. I can read my life in your eyes, while you are absorbed in your newspaper. Tell me, what are you reading? - Talk to me! Is it really that important? Do you have to read an entire article, even a whole story? How many months of separation did we endure, nothing between us but distance? Our eyes, filled with tears, are crying, our hearts, filled with longing, are still hoping, each thought that crossed my mind, each story or piece of news. - I have important things to tell you, things that reflect the longing in me. Spare me just one moment and listen to me ... don't be so obstinate. Should I tell you, - or would it be better to leave you to your newspaper?"
- English translation of original lyrics in Sudanese Arabic by poet Fadlallah Mohamed

Mohammed al Amin died in the United States on 12 November 2023, at the age of 80.

== See also ==
- Music of Sudan
- List of Sudanese singers
