= Abdel Karim Karouma =

Sudanese singer and songwriter

Abdel Karim Karouma (Arabic: عبد الكريم كرومة; 1905 – 29 January 1947, Omdurman, Sudan), born as Abdel Karim Abdallah Mukhtar, was a prolific Sudanese singer-songwriter, mainly active in the 1920s and 30s in Omdurman, and the metropolitan area of Khartoum. He became one of the first musicians to make the Haqeeba style of Sudanese music popular.

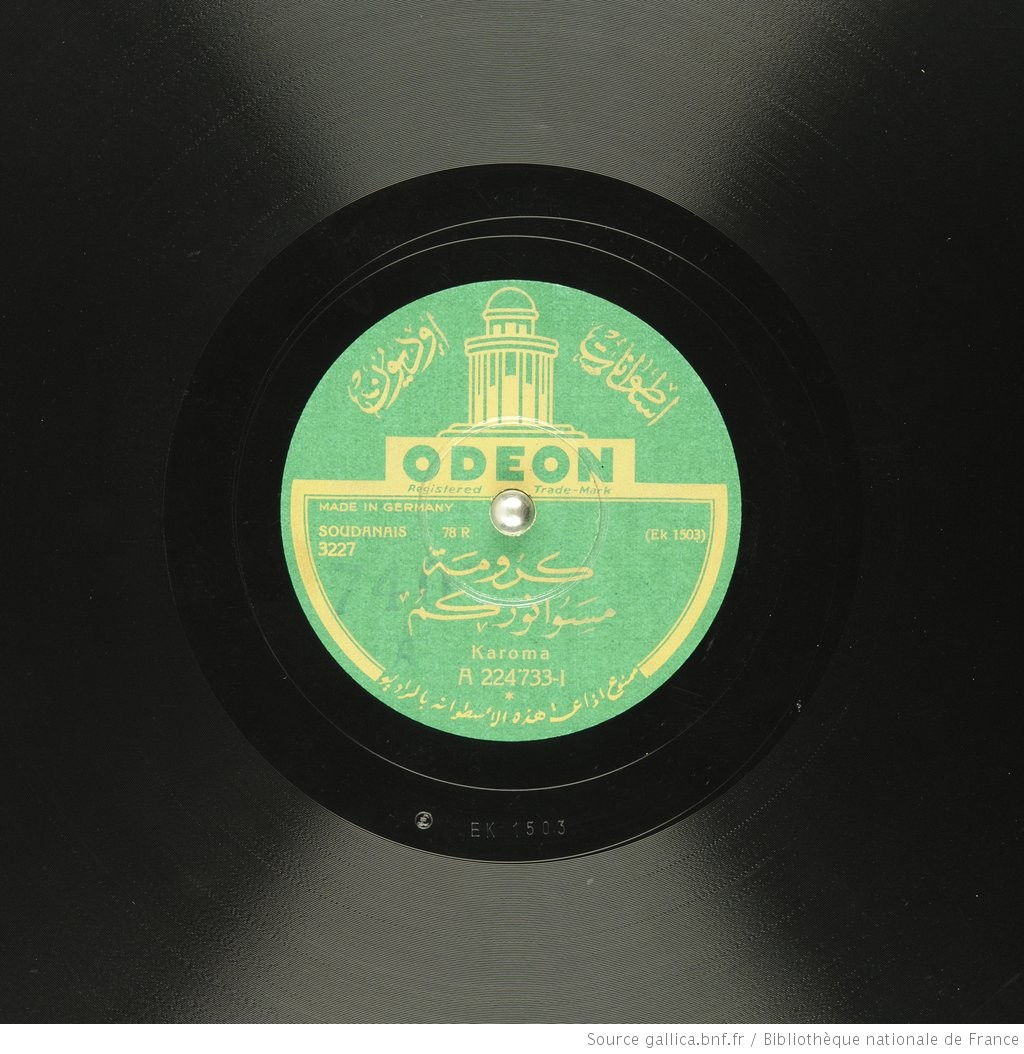
78-rpm gramophone record with two parts of a haqeeba song by Abdel Karim Karouma, late 1920s or 1930s

== Musical career ==
Despite his relatively short life, Abdel Karim Karouma was the author of several hundred songs and was an innovative musician, creating the secular haqeeba style of Sudanese music, along with other singer-songwriters, such as Mohamed Wad Al Faki or Mohammed Ahmed Saror. Critic El Sirr A. Gadour credited Karouma as having provided "new melodies and songs (which are wholly secular)."

A recording of his song Msawā nūrkum on a 78-rpm phonograph record from the late 1920s or 1930s, and giving an impression of early Haqeeba music, can be listened to through the Internet archive of the French National Library. The singer here is accompanied by a chorus and percussion; and the musical as well as poetic form were still very close to devotional Madeeh performances. - Because the standard 10-inch 78 rpm record could only hold about three minutes of sound per side, the song, which in a live performance could have lasted much longer, was divided into two parts, one for each side of the record.

In their Brief Introduction to Haqeeba, the Sudanese cultural website Locale explains the ongoing attraction of this early style of Sudanese music like this: "Many Sudanese Haqeeba singers and songwriters overlap in work and time, they have been influenced by and have worked with one another. Many have sung and written songs for and by each other, and that is how the art form perseveres till today."

== See also ==
- Music of Sudan
- List of Sudanese singers
