= Aswat Almadina =

Sudanese musical group

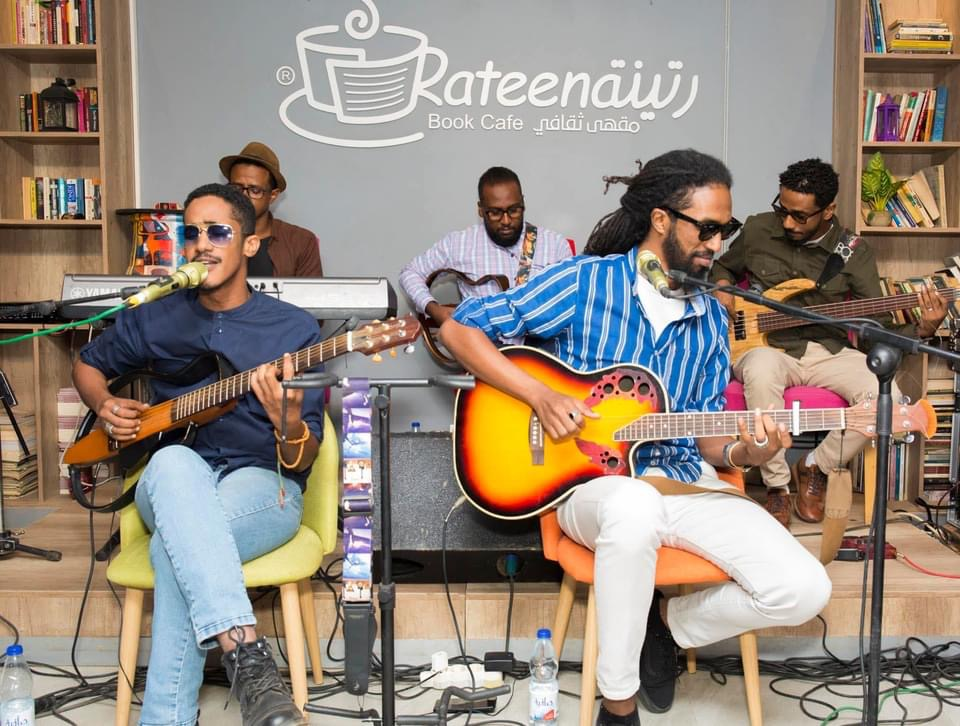
Aswat Al Madina in Rateena Café, Khartoum, 2021

Aswat Almadina, (Arabic: أصوات المدينة), meaning "Voices of the City", is a modern Sudanese music band, founded in 2016 in the capital Khartoum.

The band's original songs are influenced both by Sudanese urban music of the 21st century as well as by international pop music styles. Their lyrics are performed in Sudanese Arabic, accompanied by electric guitars, percussion and keyboards. Using metaphors that everyone in Sudan understands, lead singer Ibrahim Ibn Albadya sings about social issues or Sudanese everyday culture. Their motto "Love and peace" as well as improvised performances in public spaces of the Khartoum metropolitan area gained them a reputation of being concerned with community issues, for example by collecting waste from the streets before playing their songs for the local audience. Due to their involvement as active part of Sudan's civil society the band was selected as National Goodwill Ambassador for UNDP in 2017.

Through live concerts, music videos and social media, the band quickly became popular, especially with young people. Aswat Almadina have produced two albums, the first called Khashab ("Wood") and the second Logat Alshware, which means "language of the streets". In 2016, the German Cultural Centre in Khartoum produced two of their songs for an international project featuring music videos from Sudan, Egypt and the Middle East.

In 2026, BBC Focus on Africa broadcast an interview with lead singer Ibrahim and bass player Timon about their lives since the 2023 war in Sudan, where they talked about the band's future.

== See also ==
- Music of Sudan
- Arabic pop music
