= Ayman al-Rubo =

Sudanese contemporary musician

Ayman al-Rubo (date of birth unknown) - also spelled Al Rubaa - is a Sudanese musician from Omdurman, the second most populated city in Sudan, on the western banks of the River Nile, opposite the national capital Khartoum. Since the late 2000s, he has been considered to be the founder of Zenig (also transliterated Zanig) as a new genre of the contemporary urban music of Sudan.

Al-Rubo arguably played a key role for youth mobilisation and resistance against the Islamist regime of Omar Al Bashir as "an icon of Khartoum’s underclass."

== Personal life ==
Al-Rubo's family is reported to be originating from the war-torn Nuba Mountains in the southern part of the country. He is the son of Salah Brown, a well-known Sudanese jazz and Blues musician, and father of twin daughters.

== Career and political influence ==
In 2012, al-Rubo published a remake of the hit Azibni by Mohammed Wardi (1932-2012), one of Sudan's most eminent singers, who enjoyed great popularity in the Horn of Africa and beyond. This new version featured Wardi's son Abdal Wahab and was produced in collaboration with Media in Cooperation and Transition (MiCT). This Berlin-based non-profit organisation also designed a poster of al-Rubo and Abdal Wahab Wardi, which was disseminated in Sudan and South Sudan in a print edition of the newspaper The Niles.

Shortly afterwards, Sudanese music critic Magdi el Gizouli hailed al-Rubo as "an ecstatic performer" and stressed:

"Al-Rubo holds the title of Sudan’s Keyboard King and Rasta General. A talented keyboard player, he invented a Sudanese brand of hip hop tuned to the wildcat lyrics born of Khartoum’s underclass subculture and widely referred to as ghuna al-banat (girls’ song)"

In a 2013 interview, Ahmed Gallab a.k.a. Sinkane listed al-Rubo as one of the most influential Sudanese artists. In 2020, el Gizouli emphasized the key role that the bootleg musical genre of Zenig, pioneered by al-Rubo, played in the 2019 Sudanese Revolution. He described it as

"a fusion of West African beats and Egyptian mahrajanat style, with frequent accelerations and deceleration and techno-style repetition. Zanig queens sing about ‘antibaby pills’ and the agency of ‘MILFs".

In May 2021, Sudanese online magazine Andariya published an article about his musical style and role in Sudanese youth culture.

== See also ==
- Music of Sudan
