= Khojali Osman =

Sudanese popular musician

Khojali Osman خوجلي عثمان
- Died: 10 November, 1994 Omdurman, Sudan

Khojali Osman of Al- Halfaya, Khartoum North, was a popular Sudanese musician, who was known throughout the country for his soothing voice and romantic music. He was known for singing songs such as ma bnikhtalif, habba, habba, asma3na marra and hajri w fatishi. The period from 1975 to 1994 witnessed the growth of his fame at great speed. In 1994, his life was cut short by a mysterious murder outside the Musicians' club in Omdurman.

== Murder and suspected motives ==
On November 10, 1994, Suleiman Adam Musa, a known religious fanatic, had gone into the club with intent to kill, under the pretense that he was delivering post to some singers. Khojali, who had been standing closest to him, and another artist, Abdel Gadir Salim, were the random subjects of his attack. Fortunately, Salim survived. Official spokespeople for the authorities called the killer a 'mad man'. But this was later questioned, because Musa had held a 10-minute conversation with Salim, and appeared perfectly sane, even though he appeared as an Islamist extremist. Finally, he called out Allah Akbar (God is Great), and declared himself a mujahid, as he carried out the stabbings that led to the death of Khojali Osman.

Unlike other Sudanese artists, who had openly resisted the oppression by the government, Khojali remained neutral. Regardless of this, he was the first artist to have been killed in a politically motivated attack in the country's history.

After the attack, it was revealed that Musa had intended to harm the Sudanese musician, Mohammed Wardi, who was famed for his bold opposition towards the government. Upon finding him away in London, Musa lashed out on Khojali and Salem as random alternatives. In an interview with Wardi, journalist Brian Scudder wrote: "[Khojali Osman's] death also symbolizes the final collapse of tolerance in a country once renowned for it. While the military-Islamacist (sic!) government of Lieutenant-General Al-Bashir denies any knowledge of the murderer, many Sudanese believe it was the climate of perpetual hysteria fostered by the Government."

== Musical legacy ==
In 2018, Khojali Osman's song Malo Law Safeetna Inta (What If You Resolve What’s Between Us?) was reissued on the CD compilation Two Niles to Sing a Melody: The Violins and Synths of Sudan by Ostinato Records as part of their reissues of popular Sudanese music of the 1960s and 70s.

== See also ==
- Music of Sudan
