= Omer Ihsas =

Sudanese musician and peace activist (born 1958)

Omer Ihsas عمر احساس
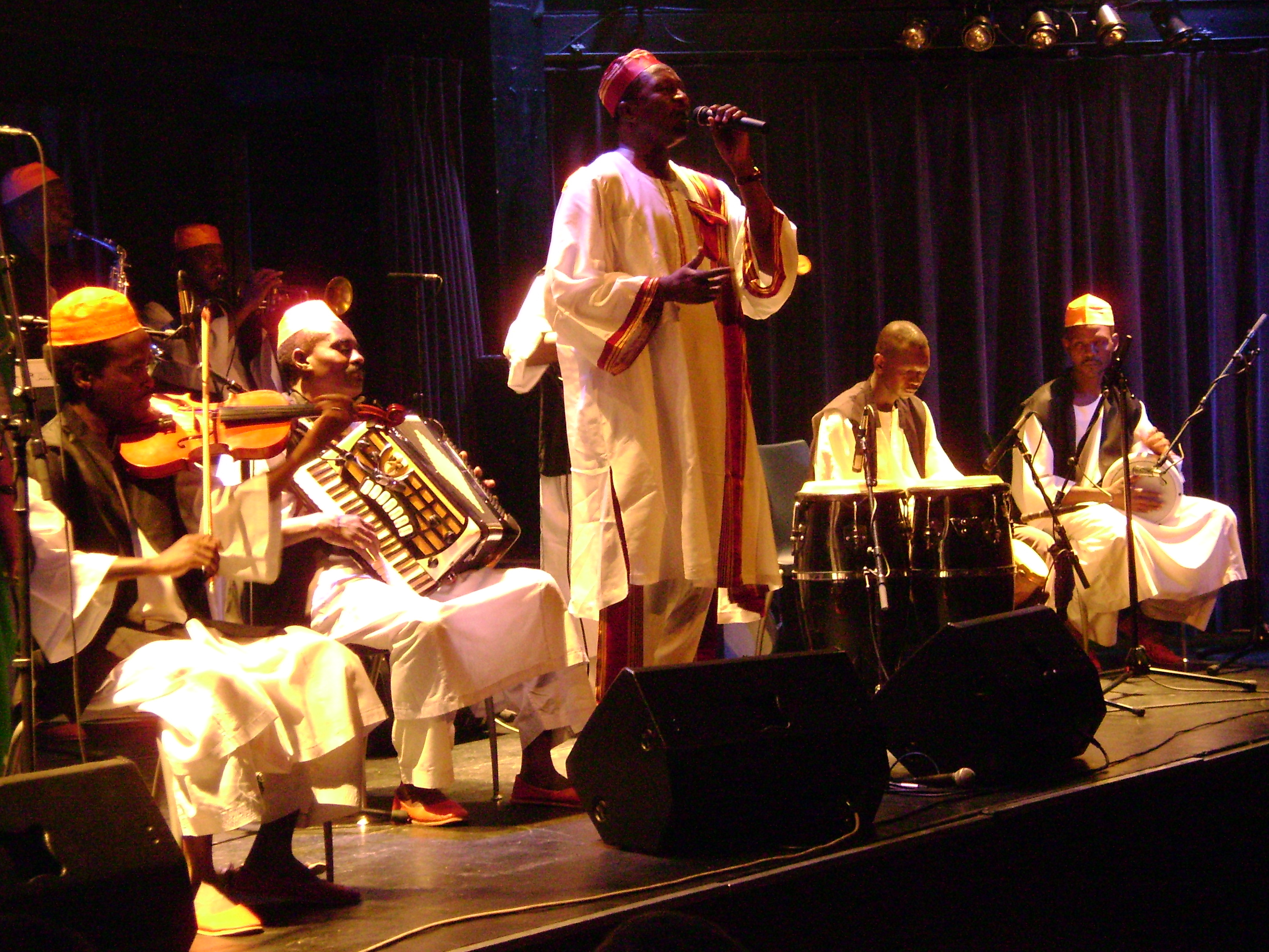

Background information
- Born: 1958 (age 67–68)
- Origin: Nyala, Sudan
- Genres: Music of Sudan, African popular music
- Occupations: singer-songwriter, peace activist
- Instrument: vocals

Omer Ihsas (born 1958 as Omar Ahmed Mustafa) is a Sudanese singer, composer and bandleader from South Darfur. Since 1987, he has become known both in Sudan and internationally for his music, based on different folk music styles from his home region, as well as for his social activism, calling for reconciliation and peace in Darfur, as well as in all of Sudan.

== Life and career ==
Ihsas was born in 1958 in Nyala, the capital of South Darfur and moved to Khartoum at the age of 23. There, he first became known as a singer while auditioning for the South Khartoum Club for Music and Arts, where he sang one of his own compositions. The title of this song, called Ihsas ("feeling" in Arabic), eventually became his stage name. From 1981 onwards, he studied music at the Institute for Music and Drama in Khartoum.

In 1987, he founded his first band, adding an accordion, violins, electric guitars and a rhythm section for his Darfuri beats. Influenced by the music of Bob Marley, he learned to play the bass guitar to strengthen the rhythm section of his music. In an interview with UNAMID, the United Nations-African Union Mission in Darfur, he talked about his artistic career and intention to support the peace process relating to the war in Darfur through his music. According to this interview, he uses African beats of different ethnic musical traditions of Darfur, with some influences from Arabic music that he learned to know in Khartoum. Ihsas believes that a song can be effective in communicating its message, because it captures popular imagination and easily comes across to the audience.

We have a history of traditional proverbs, considered the most effective literary form in Darfur. A short proverb consisting of two simple parts can actually be instrumental in resolving a dispute between two tribes, if used at the right time within a reconciliation gathering, such as in a Judiya session [one of Darfur's traditional justice mechanisms for working out legal disputes in a civil forum].

— Omer Ihsas, Sudanese songwriter from Darfur

After the military coup of 1989, Ihsas, like other artists, faced harassment and arrest by the Islamist government of Omar al Bashir. Despite this, Ihsas and his group Peace Messengers have continued to advocate for Sudanese unity, reconciliation and the end of violence. Living in Khartoum, he calls for cultural associations in the capital to strengthen relations between different ethnic groups and to bring about solutions for internal disputes in Darfur.

Omer Ihsas and his band have played both in camps for internally displaced people in Darfur, as well as on international stages. In 2008, they appeared with other Sudanese musicians, both from northern as well as southern parts of Sudan, in Chicago and Detroit as part of the Sudanese Festival of Music and Dance, promoting solidarity and reconciliation.

As a commemoration of the genocide in Darfur, his song 'Darfur Salaam (Peace for Darfur) was published as a sound file along with a song sheet on the occasion of the Holocaust Memorial Day 2018 in the United Kingdom. According to this source, his 1991 song 'Darfur Baladna' (Darfur our home) is his greatest hit, calling for peace and unity not only in Darfur, but throughout all of Sudan.

In 2005, Sudanese filmmaker Taghreed Elsanhouri released her documentary film All about Darfur with music by Omer Ihsas. The same year, he recorded an album called 'Imagine' while on tour in Austria, but in Sudan, he is best known for his performance on stage.

== See also ==
- Music of Sudan
- List of Sudanese singers
- History of Darfur
