= Jantra (musician) =

Sudanese musician

Jantra (Arabic: جنتره) is a Sudanese musician known for his style of rhythmic dance music, called "Jagala" or "Jaglara" music. Jantra's music is influenced by Astro-Nubian electronic sounds and is associated with the Fashaga underground scene in Sudan.

== Biography ==
Jantra, his stage name that means "craziness" in Arabic, was born in Fashaga, Al Qadarif state, Sudan.

Jantra began his career by performing in street parties in his hometown near the Sudan-Ethiopia border. He developed a small following. His instrument is a modified blue Yamaha Motif keyboard, adapted for Sudanese melodies. He incorporates a USB stick with tuned sounds into his performances, which include live production and DJing, and freestyling melodies.

Jantra's music combines traditional Sudanese elements with modern electronic sounds. Tracks like "Gadima," "Makhafi," "Ozali," and "Shabal" fuse African rhythms and synth patterns. His style of music is called "Jagala" or "Jaglara" music. Jantra's music is influenced by Astro-Nubian electronic sounds and is associated with the Fashaga Underground scene in Sudan.

Vik Sohonie, founder of the indie label Ostinato Records, came across Jantra's music during the first COVID lockdown in 2020 while he was exploring Sudanese music on YouTube. Some of Jantra's performances had received millions of views, but the comment sections were primarily in Sudanese Arabic. After a year of searching, Sohonie was able to contact Jantra, and he and his label producer Janto Koite visited Khartoum in 2021 to meet and record Jantra.

They recorded and released Jantra's album Synthesized Sudan: Astro-Nubian Electronic Jaglara Dance Sounds from the Fashaga Underground through Ostinato Records. The album received positive reviews.
