= Madeeh =

Islamic form of recitation

Madeeh (Arabic: مديح madīḥ) is a song-like recitation of Islamic poetry praising Allah and the Islamic prophet Muhammad. Ethnomusicologist Artur Simon described madeeh as "praise, praise poem, glorification and, in this context, praise hymn in honour of Allah and Muhammad. It is usually recited by one male performer or a small group of men and may be accompanied by hand clapping or traditional hand drums.

== Religious practice in Islamic societies ==
The poetic lyrics of madeeh typically express emotional religiosity akin to Sufi rituals or moral religious concepts. Usually they are performed in private celebrations or public festivities, such as the mawlid-an-Nabi, but may also be heard in the alleys of traditional markets.

Similar in religious expression, madeeh is different from the communal performance of dhikr recitations. Other forms of group performances in the musical culture of Sudan, Egypt and other communities in East Africa or the Middle East are called zār or tambura and are performed by women only.

== See also ==
- Sufism
- Music of Sudan
