= Al Balabil (musical group) =

Sudanese female singing group

Al Balabil البلابل
- Cover of record Sikkat madrasatna (transl. The way to our school), composed by Bashir Abbas with lyrics by Isḥaq al-Ḥalanqi, a Sudanese poet

Background information
- Origin: Khartoum
- Genres: Music of Sudan, African popular music, Arabic pop music
- Instrument: Vocals
- Years active: 1971–1988, 2007–2009
- Members: Amal Talsam; Hadia Talsam; Hayat Talsam

Al Balabil (Arabic: البلابل, transl. The Nightingales) were a popular Sudanese vocal group of three sisters, mainly active from 1971 until 1988. Their popular songs and appearance as modern female performers on stage, as well as on Sudanese radio and television, earned them fame all over East Africa and beyond, and they were sometimes referred to as the "Sudanese Supremes". After both retiring from the stage and emigrating to the United States in 1988, they gave a revival concert in 2007 in New York City's Central Park, and later in Detroit and Chicago, as well as in their native Sudan.

== Personal background and artistic career ==
The three sisters Amal, Hadia, and Hayat Talsam began their career as a group in late 1971. Having grown up in a neighbourhood of Greater Khartoum, they enjoyed the support of their parents; their father, Muhammad Abdul Majid Talsam, was a university professor and became the group's manager. After a first period of singing in a Nubian folklore group, they were encouraged to form their own band by Sudanese musician and oud player Bashir Abbas, who later composed many of their songs. The name for the trio was proposed by Sudanese novelist and poet Ali El-Makk.

The title track of their first album, Those Who Ask Don’t Get Lost, refers to an Arabic saying encouraging people to ask questions. According to a magazine article entitled "Five Songs that defined Sudan's Golden Era", the lyrics tell the story of a lover’s anticipation: “If you cared to ask about me, you’d know where I am today / I’m still waiting for you. Have you forgotten that I invited you over?”

Their song “The Boat Set Sail”, with lyrics in Nubian language, evokes the destructive effects of the Aswan Dam on the region of Nubia in southern Egypt and northern Sudan. The family of the three singers originally came from the Nubian city of Wadi Halfa, and this song talks about the flooding of a large part of Nubia and the displacement of its inhabitants.

In 1988, shortly before strict Sharia laws were imposed in Sudan that stifled cultural life for the next 30 years, the sisters and their families moved to the United States and stopped performing for many years. In 2007 they appeared again, on stage in New York City, the following year in Chicago and Detroit, and again in Sudan in August 2009. This revival also included new recordings, like the Nubian song "Life is Beautiful". During their rise to fame they recorded many songs, released mostly in Sudan on vinyl records and music cassettes.

In her article about the ongoing popularity of Al Balabil in the aftermath of the Sudanese Revolution, Sudanese filmmaker and author Taghreed Elsanhouri wrote about the ways the group had led the way from earlier hageeba and daluka songs to their own, very popular style:

Al Balabel were a phenomenon in their time because their music felt and sounded innovative, marking a departure from the patriotic and nationalistic songs of Al-hageeba, the songs celebrating Sudan’s emergence from British colonialism. Their musical output also departed from the vernacular daluka songs that were part of a tradition of orally transmitted songs performed by women singers at weddings. Their creativity and innovation was in the compositional arrangements of their music, which not only borrowed from the traditional orally transmitted Sudanese daluka and praise songs, but also integrated lyrics about the lives of urban women to create a unique new sound.

— Taghreed Elsanhouri, Vanquisher of troubles or light of our home

== See also ==
- Music of Sudan
- African popular music
