= Azhari Mohamed Ali =

Sudanese poet and activist

- Native name: أزهري محمد علي
- Born: 19 November 1954 (age 70); El Matamma, River Nile State
- Occupation: Poet
- Language: Sudanese Arabic

Azhari Mohamed Ali (Arabic: أزهري محمد علي; born 19 November 1954), is a Sudanese poet and activist.

== Early life and career ==
Ali was born on 19 November 1954 in the village of Al-Makniyah, El Matamma, River Nile State. He lost his parents when he was only four years old, and started his life as a worker in the textile factory in Al-Hasaheisa; then formed a duet with Mustafa Sayed Ahmed and Wad Al-Maqboul.

== Activism ==
Ali wrote extensively about revolution and protesting. A line from his poem was recited by the Alaa Salah, “The bullet doesn’t kill. What kills is the silence of people”, which has been a well-known slogan chanted by protesters during the 2018-2019 Sudanese protests and earlier in the 2011–2013 Sudanese protests. During the Sudanese protests in 2021, Ali was physically assaulted by the police. According to Ali, the police chocked him with a flag he was carrying, beaten him with hands and batons, tore his clothes while shouting a torrent of hurtful and obscene phrases.

== Personal life ==
Ali’s son, Zaryab, died on 10 July 2021 in Paris from cancer. Ali’s brother died an year later in September 2022.
