= Ramey Dawoud =

American songwriter

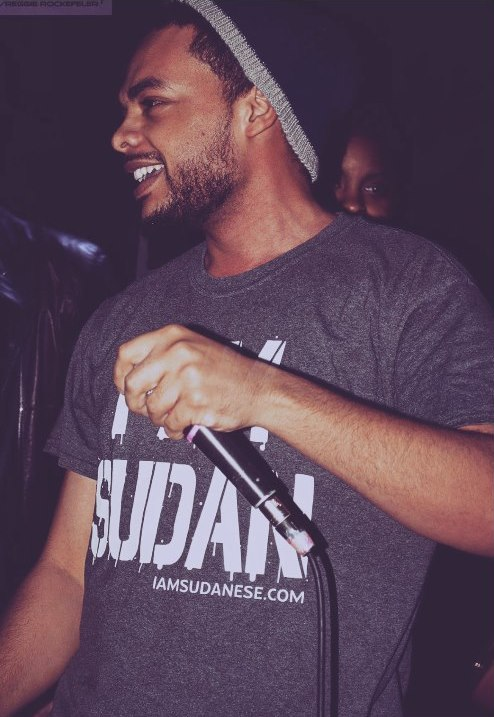
- Ramey Dawoud performing live in 2016.

Background information
- Also known as: Kashta
- Born: Ramey Dawoud; 19 September 1991 (age 34); Alexandria, Egypt
- Origin: Wadi Halfa, Sudan
- Genres: Hip hop
- Occupation: Rapper/Actor
- Instrument: Vocals
- Years active: 2008-2022
- Spouse: Ola Labib (m. 2020)

Ramey Dawoud is a Sudanese-American retired rapper, actor, songwriter, activist and author. He is of Nubian descent and his family originates from the Nubian town of Wadi Halfa, Sudan. Ramey Dawoud's music is known for its lyrics highlighting life in the diaspora. He is perhaps best known for his starring role in the award-winning short film, Faisal Goes West (2013).

In 2021, Dawoud collaborated with Taras Press to participate in the "Read, Write, and Count in Nubian: ⲅⲉⲣⲓ, ⲫⲁ̄ⲓ̈, ⲟ̄ⲙⲓⲣ!" Kickstarter campaign to publish four books written in Nubian languages to encourage literacy in the Nubian alphabet, for which he wrote and published Nabra's Nubian Numbers, a children's book written in Nobiin and English which teaches Nobiin numbers and incorporates various references to Nubian culture.

== Discography ==
Albums/EPs

- Diary Of A Menace (2008)
- Reflections EP (2013)
- Kashta (2017)
- I Am Because We Are (2018)
- Lost In The Attic (2021)

== Filmography ==
Year	Film	Role	Genre
2013	Faisal Goes West	Faisal	Drama
2013	Choice	Antagonist	Drama/Silent
2018	Terrorist Number 4	Amir	Comedy
2020	Revolution From Afar	Himself	Documentary
