= Aisha Musa Ahmad =

Sudanese female musician

Aisha al-Falatiya عائشة الفلاتية
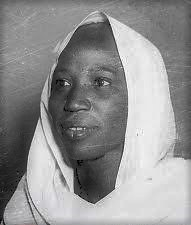
- Portrait of Sudanese singer Aisha al Falatiya

Background information
- Born: Aisha Musa Ahmad; 1905; Kassala, Sudan
- Died: 24 February 1974 (aged 69) Omdurman, Sudan
- Genres: Sudanese music
- Occupation: singer
- Years active: 1942–1960s

Aisha Musa Ahmad (Arabic: عائشة موسى أحمد, romanized: ʾAyša Mūsā Aḥmad, b. 1905 – 24 February 1974), better known as Aisha al-Falatiya (also transliterated as Aisha El Falatia (Arabic: عائشة الفلاتية), was a Sudanese singer. Her early career was hindered by prejudice against female performers, but in 1942 she became the first woman to sing on Sudanese radio. Her career continued into the 1960s, and she recorded over 150 songs in total, achieving popularity in both Sudan and Egypt.

== Early life ==
Aisha al-Falatiya was born in Kassala, close to the present-day border with Eritrea. Both her parents were immigrants to Sudan from Sokoto, Nigeria, having initially passed through the area as pilgrims and then later decided to settle there. Her mother, Hujra, belonged to the Hausa people, while her father, Musa Ahmad Yahiyya, was a faqīh (religious scholar) of Hausa origin. The oldest of seven children, Aisha was schooled at her father's khalwa (religious school) in Omdurman, where she learned to memorise and recite the Quran. Her later skill in singing has been attributed to her lessons in recitation.

== Singing career and later life ==
Aisha al-Falatiya began to sing professionally at the age of fourteen, and soon achieved a degree of fame as a wedding singer. Her father disapproved of her activities, as female singers were stigmatised in Sudanese society at the time. He attempted to end her career by arranging her marriage, but she subsequently divorced her husband and continued working as a singer. Aisha's career only progressed in the late 1930s, when she was discovered by a representative of an Egyptian record company. She recorded several songs for the company in Cairo, and her music subsequently became popular in Sudanese coffeehouses. Her recordings were released under the name "Aisha al-Falatiya", a reference to her Fulani ancestry. (Note: Aisha's father's ethnic group, the Hausa, are known as the Fallata in Sudan. Her stage name consequently translates as "Aisha the Fulani".)

During World War II, Aisha worked as a troop entertainer, singing for Sudanese soldiers active in the East African and North African Campaigns. In 1942, she became the first female Sudanese singer to perform on radio, singing a selection of her songs for Omdurman Radio (established by the British administration the previous year). She performed alongside her sister, Jidawwiya, who played the oud and had her own orchestra. The sisters' performance was well received by the station's listeners, but was condemned by conservative commentators, and several male singers subsequently boycotted the station in protest. At one point, the enduring hostility she faced both due to her gender and her ethnicity led her to contemplate moving to Nigeria.

Aisha's continued popularity eventually legitimised the presence of women on public radio, and in her later years she even performed duets with male singers. In total, she recorded over 150 songs during her career, mainly for Omdurman Radio, and remained active into the 1960s. She was best known for her love songs (referred to as tom-tom songs, and generally written by male poets), but some of her music was political in nature, and she was known as an advocate of women's rights, workers' rights, anti-colonialism, and Sudanese independence. Aisha lived in Omdurman until her death in 1974, but was also a frequent visitor to Egypt. She was married twice in her life: She got divorced from her first husband, Ibrahim Adbarawi, after two years without having a child. Subsequently, she married Jiddu Kabli with whom she had all her children.

In the novel The Drowning by Sudanese writer Hammour Ziada, a female character quotes a song by Aisha al-Falatiya:

Oh my beloved
I am crazy for you
From the day I fell in love with your beauty
The armies of your love have worn me out
The more you dally with me
The more wiles I use against you
Oh green one, the colour of lemon
You have taken away from me my sight
And blinded my eyes.

== See also ==
- Music of Sudan
- List of Sudanese singers
- Women in Sudan
