= Taghreed Elsanhouri =

Sudanese documentary filmmaker and producer

- تغريد السنهوري
- Occupation(s): Filmmaker, producer, author
- Notable work: All about Darfur (2005)

Taghreed Elsanhouri (Arabic: تغريد السنهوري ) is a British-Sudanese documentary filmmaker, film producer and author, based in London. She is mainly known for All about Darfur (2005), a film about the war in Darfur. For her 2012 documentary Our Beloved Sudan, she interviewed Sudanese politicians as well as a Sudanese citizen with parents from both the northern and southern parts of Sudan, presenting both political and individual stories before independence of South Sudan in 2011.

== Life and career ==
Elsanhouri started working for TV news and entertainment programmes, such as MBC and Al Jazeera. After this, she continued her career as freelance filmmaker and film consultant for international development projects. Further, she created a community video film project for social change and peacebuilding, called 'Cultural Healing'. The project provided training for people from different backgrounds "to make short documentary films that express their own culture and traditions". It was sponsored by the European Union and implemented in Sudan from 2011 to 2013.

Her first documentary film All about Darfur won the Award of Commendation from the American Anthropological Association in 2006 and a prize at the Zanzibar International Film Festival (ZIFF) in 2005. It was also shown at other film festivals, such as the Toronto international Film Festival 2005. All About Darfur intends to present "eloquent, at times contradictory, voices from within Sudan", as Elsanhouri interviewed "ordinary Sudanese in outdoor tea shops, markets, refugee camps and living rooms." These interviews attempt to explain how persistent prejudices of people involved could "suddenly burst into a wild fire of ethnic violence."

In 2007, her screenplay for the narrative feature project Khartoum Story was selected for the Berlinale Talents of the Berlin International Film Festival.

Mother Unknown, Elsanhouri's second independent film won the UNICEF Child Rights award in 2009. The same year, she made a documentary film for Al Jazeera International for their documentary series 'Witness' and a number of films on traditional children’s games in the Gulf region for Disney Channel Dubai.

Our Beloved Sudan, her third documentary feature, premiered at the Dubai Film Festival in December 2011. It was awarded the special Jury Silver distinction at the Luxor African Film Festival in February 2012 and was also shown at the Herbert F. Johnson Museum, New York, as part of their exhibition 'Lines of Control' in the same year. It presents the biographical story of Amira Alteraify, a Sudanese woman, who was born to a mother from southern and a father from northern Sudan before the separation in 2011. Further, she was able to interview Sudanese politicians such as Sadiq al-Mahdi and Hassan al-Turabi.

Variety magazine's film critic Jay Weissberg wrote about this film: "Though working on a shoestring budget (and it shows), Elsanhouri got access to major players in the country’s internecine conflicts, and was on hand for the recent independence of South Sudan."

Commenting on Sudanese society and politics, she has contributed articles on the Sudanese revolution for the news magazine Middle East Eye.

=== Filmography ===
- All About Darfur - documentary film (2005)
- Witness: the Orphans of Mygoma - TV documentary for Al Jazeera (2009)
- Mother Unknown - documentary film (2009)
- Our Beloved Sudan - documentary film (2012)

== See also ==
- Cinema of Sudan
- Women in African cinema
