= Sayed Khalifa =

Sudanese musician (1928-2001)

- Birth name: Ali Muhammad Khalifa
- Born: 1928; Al-Dibeiba, Anglo-Egyptian Sudan
- Died: July 2, 2001 (aged 72–73); Amman, Jordan
- Genres: Music of Sudan
- Occupation(s): Singer, composer
- Years active: 1958–2001

Sayed Khalifa (Arabic: سيد خليفة, 1928 – 2001) was a popular Sudanese singer and composer, primarily active from the 1950s to the 1980s. Khalifa was one of the first Sudanese singers trained in formal music theory. Like other Sudanese singers, he performed in both Standard Arabic and Sudanese Arabic, thus appealing both to the educated elite as well as to the common people. Khalifa is best known for his songs "Ya Watani" (My Homeland) and "Izzayakum Keifinnakum" (How are you?).

== Life and artistic career ==
Khalifa was born in 1928 in Al-Dibeiba, near Khartoum, Sudan. In 1947, he won a scholarship to the Arab Music Institute in Cairo, where he studied music in a formal way. After touring venues in Africa for several years, Khalifa returned to the newly independent Sudan in 1956 and performed the patriotic anthem "Ya Watani" (My Homeland). He released many other popular songs like "Ana Maly wa Malo" and "Mambo as-Sudani".

After the rise of Omar al-Bashir's government to power in 1989, censorship made it difficult for Khalifa to continue with his career. Some of his songs, like "Lailun Wa Khamrun Wa Shifah" (Night, liquor and lips), were deleted from the radio archives. He died on 2 July, 2001 in Amman from heart problems.

Recent interest in reissues of popular music from Sudan made his song Gameel Basam (Beautiful Smile) available on the CD "The Lost 45s of Sudan", published in 2015 by Habibi Funk Records. And in 2018, his song Igd Allooli (The Pearl Necklace) was reissued on the CD compilation Two Niles to Sing a Melody: The Violins and Synths of Sudan by Ostinato Records as part of their reissues of popular Sudanese music of the 1960s and 70s.

Discography

- Sayed Khalifa at MusicBrainz

== See also ==
- Music of Sudan
