= Mahjoub Sharif =

Contemporary Sudanese poet, teacher and political prisoner

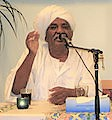
- Born: 1 January 1948; Ab Qadum, Musalamiyya, Sudan
- Died: 2 April 2014 (aged 66); Omdurman, Sudan
- Occupations: Poet, teacher, activist
- Writing career
- Genre: Sudanese literature

Mahjoub Sharif (1 January 1948 – 2 April 2014), born as Mahjoub Muhammad Sharif Muhammad, was a Sudanese poet, teacher and activist for human rights. He became known in Sudan and other Arabic-speaking countries for his colloquial poetry and his public engagement, both committed to further the causes of democracy, freedom, general well-being and national identity. His poetry was put to music by eminent musicians, such as Mohammed Wardi and Mohamed Mounir, but also led to repeated political imprisonment under different Sudanese governments.

== Education and work ==
Mahjoub Sharif was born in a rural setting to a family of petty traders and spent his childhood in Omdurman, while visiting a primary school in the town Arab. He moved away from the trade of his family and was trained as teacher in the Maridi Institute for Teachers in Khartoum; afterwards he was a primary school teacher most of his working years. Due to his poems critical of the regime of Gaafar Nimeiry, he was imprisoned the first time in 1971, followed by numerous prison spells throughout the 1970s, 1980s and 1990s. This was also connected to frequent suspension from public service and short-lived permission to continue after release from prison.

== Poetry and other writings ==
Mahjoub Sharif's main body of work consists of poems that range from short children's songs to long revolutionary elegies. He also wrote plays and short stories for children, one of which – Zeinab and the mango tree – has been published in Dutch, French and English (see Publications). However, although some unauthorized translations exist, almost none of Mahjoub Sharif's writings are available in English or other languages. Mahjoub Sharif's poetry is characterized by a combination of colloquial, picturesque, playful, but also forcefully engaged language that has earned him the name ‘people’s poet’ and mixes "observations on everyday life and politics with love songs and poems for children". His lyrical style is often shown with this poem on the security apparatus of oppressive regimes:

Hey, buffoon!
Cling tightly!
Beware falling apart!
Beware and be alert!
Bend your ears to every sign of movement
Keep watch on your own shadow
and, when the leaves rustle,
Shut yourself off and keep still!
Life is so dangerous, buffoon.
Open fire!
Bullets aimed at everything
every word uttered
every breeze passing
without your permission
My lord buffoon.
Instruct the sparrows,
the village lanterns,
the towns' windows,
every whispering blade of grass
to report to you.
As police, let the ants infiltrate
and build the security state
Ask the raindrops
to write their reports,
Buffoon...

His poetic language therefore also lent itself to express views beyond governments’ official discourses, for example during the separation of northern and South Sudan, which was marked by polarized hostility. Mahjoub Sharif stressed feelings of sadness, missed chances and the perception of common causes across both countries:

The trees have passed
Like imaginary dreams
Nice and gentle people
Through shades and clouds
The trees have passed

Where are you my dears?
It’s a painful scene for me
Where are you going?
Mary I will miss you
I am shedding tears
Yet we are citizens by our marks
In drawing we are neighbours
The trees have passed

For the Rift Valley Institute fellow Magdi El Gizouli, this usage of his language went so far that his "extraordinary capacity to imagine another future in feather-light lines, suitable even for the playful entertainment of children" was made "part of the politically erotic repertoire of opposition congregation whenever opportunity allowed".

== Political imprisonment ==
The frequent imprisonment of Mahjoub Sharif under Gaafar Nimeiri and then under Omar al-Bashir caught the attention of Amnesty International and later Africa Watch/Human Rights Watch. His case was also made part of BBC's Prisoners of Consciousness series, presented by David Attenborough. Especially Amnesty International has maintained an active interest in the case for more than two decades, spanning from a first report in 1980, over a 1990 campaign to send cards to him in prison, of which he received about 2,000, to a thank you event organized by Mahjoub Sharif in London in August 2008, when he sent letters back to the available addresses.

== Death ==
Since 2004, Mahjoub Sharif had been suffering from idiopathic pulmonary fibrosis, which resulted from the damage caused by the time spent in prison and was further complicated by diabetes type 2. He died on 2 April 2014 at a hospital in Omdurman and was buried in the graveyard Ahmed Sharfi in the same town.

His funeral was attended by hundreds of Sudanese and broadcast by several major Arabic news channels, among them Sky News Arabia, Al Jazeera Arabic, Al Arabiya, and BBC Arabic.

== Publications ==
Children and soldiers. Beirut, 1975. (In Arabic, republished by Aro Commercial Press, Khartoum, 1986).

Al-Soumbulayya (Tiny spike of grain). Azza Publishing House, Khartoum, 1998. (In Arabic)

Zeinab and the mango tree. Abd al-Karim Mirghani Cultural Center, printed in Cairo, 1999. (Original Arabic, republished in Dutch, French and English)

Nafaj. Turath Publishing, London, 2002. (In Arabic)

== See also ==
- Sudanese literature
- Arabic poetry
