= Kissar =

East African musical instrument

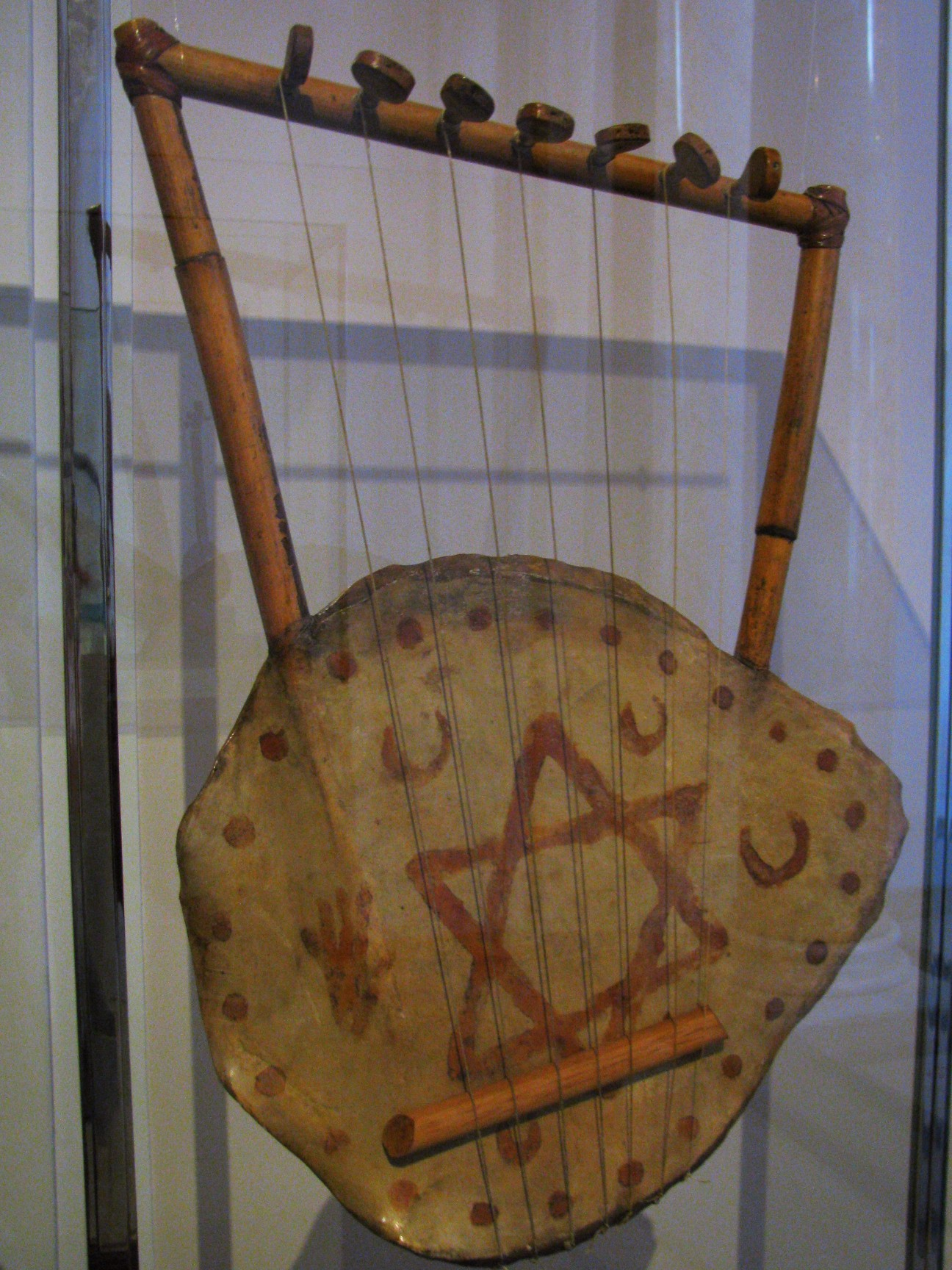
- A 19th century kissar in the Kunsthistorisches Museum in Vienna

String instrument
- Hornbostel–Sachs classification: 123.5 (Composite chordophone sounded with a plectrum)
- Developed: Sumer, Egypt, (Bronze Age)

Related instruments
- lyre; Cithara; harp; gue

The kissar (also spelled kissir), tanbour or gytarah barbaryeh is the traditional Nubian lyre, still in use in Egypt, Sudan, Eritrea and Ethiopia. It consists of a body having instead of the traditional tortoise-shell back, a shallow, round bowl of wood, covered with a soundboard of sheepskin, in which are two small round sound-holes. The arms, set through the soundboard at points distant about the third of the diameter from the circumference, have the familiar fan shape. Five gut strings, knotted round the bar and raised from the soundboard by means of a bridge tailpiece similar to that in use on the modern guitar, are plucked by means of a plectrum by the right hand for the melody, while the left hand sometimes twangs some of the strings as a soft drone accompaniment.

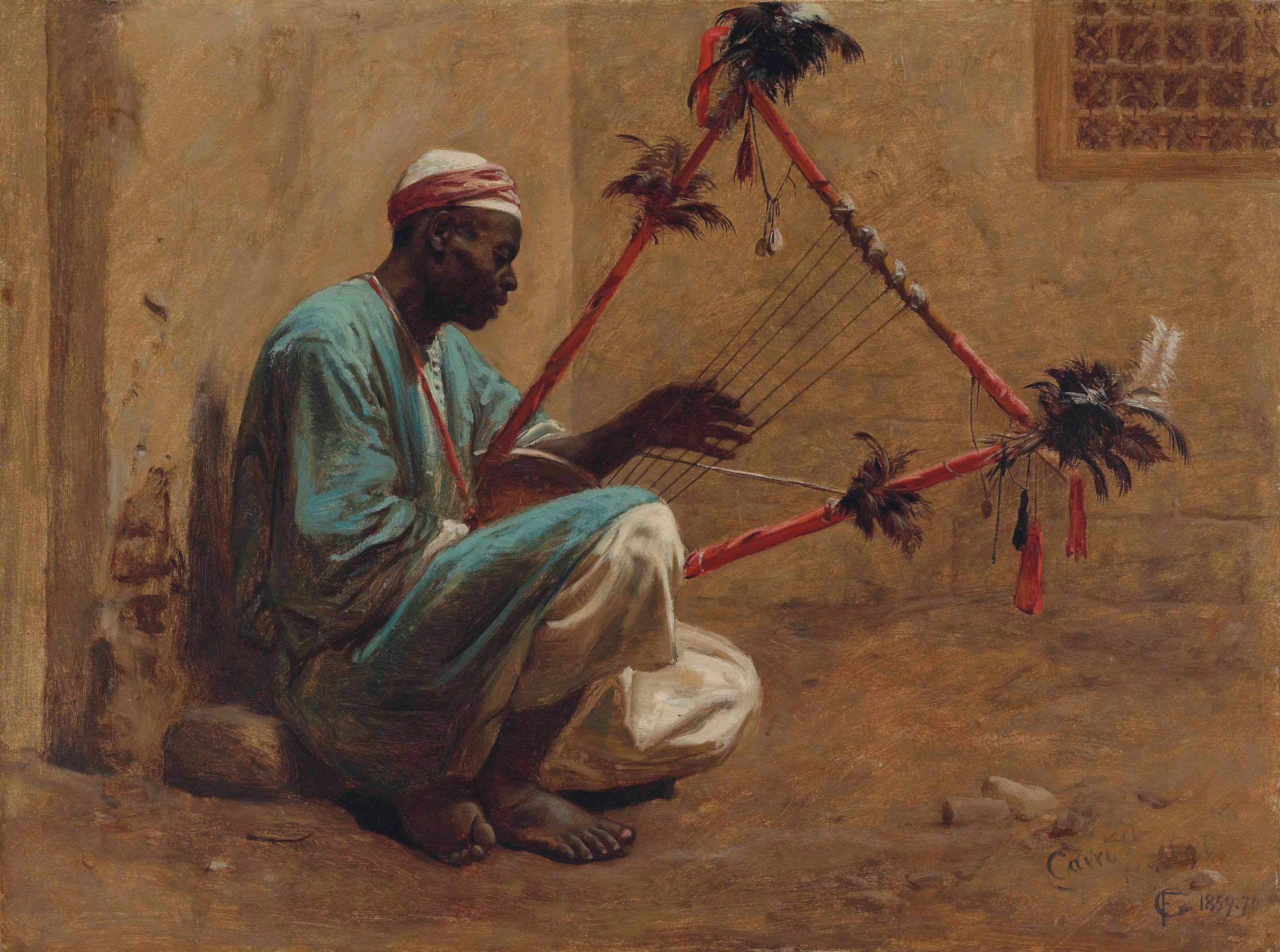
Egypt, 1859. The Kissar Player,
painting by Frederick Goodall

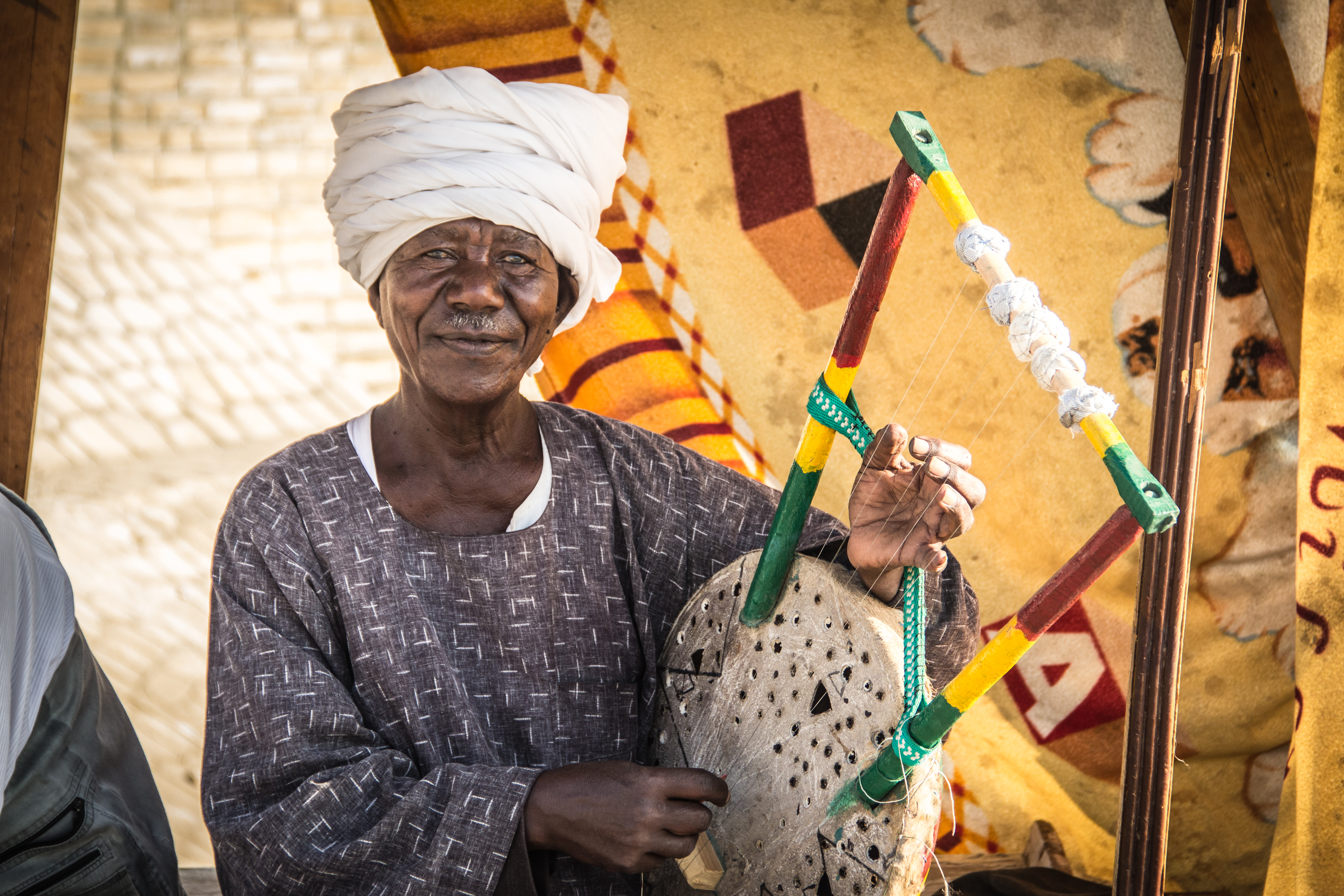
Man playing kissar in Egypt

The kissar has been a popular instrument in northern Sudan in Nubian and Shaigiya music, but also among the Nuba and Beja people.

== See also ==
- Krar
- Tanbura
