= Denar (disambiguation) =

The Macedonian denar is the currency of North Macedonia.

Denar may also refer to:

== Currency ==
- Dinar, a currency unit in several countries
- Polish silver denar coin pictured on the reverse of some Polish złoty banknotes
- Bohemian coin replaced by Prague groschen
- Banovac or banski denar, a historic Croatian coin

== Other uses ==
- RV Denar 2, a Turkish research and survey vessel
- Denar, a published work of Slavko Pregl
- Kay Denar, songwriter (see Category:Songs written by Kay Denar)

== See also ==
- Dinar (disambiguation)
