= Dananir =

Dananir or dananeer may refer to:

- Dinars (sing. dinar), a quantity of such money, historically gold or silver coins—dananir being an unadapted borrowing of the Arabic plural form (Note: occasionally appears in English-language Islamic (and translated Arabic) literature, as seen in fragments such as: In Buhkari Kitabul Bayuh, the terms dinar and dananir have been used, and similarly, in other books of ahadith (traditions of the Prophet (SAW)), these terms for money have been mentioned ... — Marazi, Hamidullah, "Ethical Foundations of Monetary Transactions in Islamic Economics", Islamic finance and sustainable development: balancing spirituality, values and profit. Islamic business and finance. Routledge. 2025. pp. 69–77. ISBN 978-1-003-50557-0. Later Hanafi scholars such as Ibn 'Abidin defined property as 'everything that has a value can be valued by darahim or dananir'. — Hassan, Kabir; Mahlknecht, Michael, Islamic Capital Markets: Products and Strategies, John Wiley & Sons. 4 April 2011. p. 155. ISBN 978-0-470-68957-8.)
- Dananeer, 1940 Egyptian musical film
- Dananir al-Barmakiyya, early-Abbasid-era Islamic courtesan (Note: often referred to simply as Dananir or Dananeer)
- Dananir (qayna of Ibn Kunasa), early-Abbasid-era Islamic courtesan
- Dananeer Mobeen (born 2001), Pakistani actress and influencer

== See also ==
- Dinar (disambiguation)
