= List of World Heritage Sites in North Macedonia =

Location of the World Heritage Sites within North Macedonia

The United Nations Educational, Scientific and Cultural Organization (UNESCO) World Heritage Sites are places of importance to cultural or natural heritage as described in the UNESCO World Heritage Convention, established in 1972. Following the breakup of Yugoslavia, the Socialist Republic of Macedonia declared independence as Republic of Macedonia in 1991 and succeeded the UNESCO convention on 30 April 1997 under the name the former Yugoslav Republic of Macedonia (due to the naming dispute with Greece). Following the Prespa agreement, the name of the country was officially changed to North Macedonia in 2019.

As of 2021, there are two sites in North Macedonia inscribed on the list and further four on the tentative list. Natural and Cultural Heritage of the Ohrid region was inscribed at the 3rd UNESCO session in 1979. In 2019, the site was expanded to include the Albanian portion of the lake, thus becoming a transnational site. In 2021, the Ancient and Primeval Beech Forests of the Carpathians and Other Regions of Europe site was extended to include a beech forest within Mavrovo National Park, the site is shared with 17 European countries. The tentative sites are the Cave Slatinski Izvor, the geological formation Markovi Kuli, the megalithic archaeo-astronomical complex Kokino, and the Church of St George in Kurbinovo.

== World Heritage Sites ==
UNESCO lists sites under ten criteria; each entry must meet at least one of the criteria. Criteria i through vi are cultural, and vii through x are natural.

* Transnational site

Site	Image	Location (municipality)	Year listed	UNESCO data	Description
Natural and Cultural Heritage of the Ohrid region*	Ohrid	Ohrid	1979	i, iii, iv, vii (mixed)	The town of Ohrid is one of the oldest human settlements in Europe with archaeological remains from the Bronze Age to the Medieval Era. It is a prominent testimony of Byzantine arts and architecture, such as the churches of St. John at Kaneo and St. Sophia. Ohrid has the most ancient Slavonic monastery and the first Slavonic University in the Balkans. Lake Ohrid dates to the pre-glacial era and provides a unique refuge for numerous endemic and relict freshwater species of flora and fauna. The site was extended in 1980 and a minor modification of the boundaries took place in 2009. In 2019, the site was extended to include the Albanian portion of the lake.
Ancient and Primeval Beech Forests of the Carpathians and Other Regions of Europe*	Valley of Dlaboka River	Mavrovo and Rostuša	2021	1133quater; ix (natural)	This site comprises forests in 18 European countries. These forests demonstrate the postglacial expansion process of European beech forests and exhibit the most complete and comprehensive ecological patterns and processes of pure and mixed stands of European beech across a variety of environmental conditions. The site was first listed in 2007 in Slovakia and Ukraine. It was extended in 2011, 2017, and 2021 to include forests in several other countries. The Dlaboka River valley in North Macedonia was added to the list in 2021.

== Tentative list ==
In addition to the sites inscribed on the World Heritage list, member states can maintain a list of tentative sites that they may consider for nomination. Nominations for the World Heritage list are only accepted if the site was previously listed on the tentative list. As of 2021, North Macedonia recorded four sites on its tentative list.

Site	Image	Location (municipality)	Year listed	UNESCO criteria	Description
Cave Slatinski Izvor	Markovi kuli	Makedonski Brod	2004	vii, viii, ix (natural)	The longest explored cave system in North Macedonia. The caves are located above the Slatina river near the village of Slatina, North Macedonia and were probably created during the last ice age. Several cave formations are found in the system.
Markovi Kuli	Markovi kuli	Prilep	2004	vii, viii, ix (natural)	A geological formation consisting of magmatic and metamorphic rocks. The configuration of the terrain itself and the favorable geographical position caused this area to be constantly populated at least since the Bronze Age.
Archaeo-astronomical Site Kokino	Kokino	Staro Nagoričane	2009	i, ii, iii (cultural)	A megalithic astronomical complex on the top of the mountain Tatićev Kamen, dating to the Bronze Age. Stone marker cuttings indicate the spots of the rising of the Sun in the days of the summer solstice, the winter solstice, the spring and autumn equinox, as well as the rising of the full Moon on the eastern horizon, when it has a maximum and minimum declination in winter and summer. The site was uncovered in 2001.
Church St. George (Sv Gjorgji) Kurbinovo	Church of St George	Resen	2020	i, ii, iii (cultural)	A 12th-century Orthodox monastery in the Prespa region, notable for its rare frescoes from the Macedonian Renaissance period of Byzantine art. St George is the largest aisleless church in the country.
