= Sound velocity probe =

Device used for measuring the speed of sound

A sound velocity probe is a device that is used for measuring the speed of sound, specifically in the water column, for oceanographic and hydrographic research purposes.

== History ==
Early depth sounding was achieved using lead line sounding (or sounding line), where a lead weight attached to a length of rope marked with depth values. As this method was mechanical in nature, the only correction that was applied to the sounding was the reduction of the sounding for tidal height. In the mid 20th century, sonar systems were developed to allow the measurement of underwater distances using the two way travel time of an acoustic pulse. This allowed the surveyor to take many more soundings in a given period of time and was less labor intensive than using a lead line.

== Use ==
For many applications of sonar the speed of sound can be assumed to be an average speed of 1500 meters per second. However, the speed of sound in seawater can vary from 1440 to 1570 meters per second.

An example of a sound velocity probe – the Teledyne Odom Digibar Pro

As the relationship of speed, time and distance are dependent, in order to accurately measure the distance one must also know the time of transmit to receive and the speed of sound in water accurately. There are two methods that this can be achieved.

Firstly, the surveyor can use an air filled metal bar lowered below the transducer, attached at each end by a rope marked with depth values. If the values on the rope can be assumed to be correct, then the bar is lowered at set depth intervals and observed on the echo sounder trace. The values of echo sounder depth can be plotted against the "true" depth of the bar. Any fixed offset value would then be attributed to a draft value correction, and any gradient change seen is as a result of a difference in sound velocity. This method is called a "Bar Check", and is performed by the surveyor prior to gathering data.

Secondly, the surveyor can use a sound velocity probe that can be lowered into the water in the area to be surveyed to measure the actual speed of sound. This has the advantage of being quicker than a bar check and it can be performed when there is boat motion due to swell and sea, although any draft offset of the vessel is not identified using this method.

== Theory of operation ==
There are two common methods to obtaining sound velocity in water using the probe method.

Firstly, the main three variables that affect sound velocity may be measured using a Conductivity, Temperature & Depth Probe (CTD Probe). This instrument can determine the salinity, temperature and pressure variables, and then calculate the sound velocity of the water using one of the many formulae available.

Secondly, the speed of sound may be directly measured using a small acoustic transducer and a reflecting surface, mounted at a known distance from the acoustic center of the transducer. If the distance from the transducer to the reflector is known, and the time taken from the transmit to the receive pulse is known, then the speed of sound in water can be calculated. Transducers used in sound velocity probes are typically of a high frequency (around 1 - 4 MHz) as the transmit and receive distances are close enough to mitigate any significant absorption losses.

Close up view of the Teledyne Odom Digibar S showing the transducer, reflector and temperature sensor

== See also ==
- Hydrographic survey
- Valeport Limited
