= Icon of the Annunciation, St. Catherine's Monastery =

12th-century Byzantine Christian icon

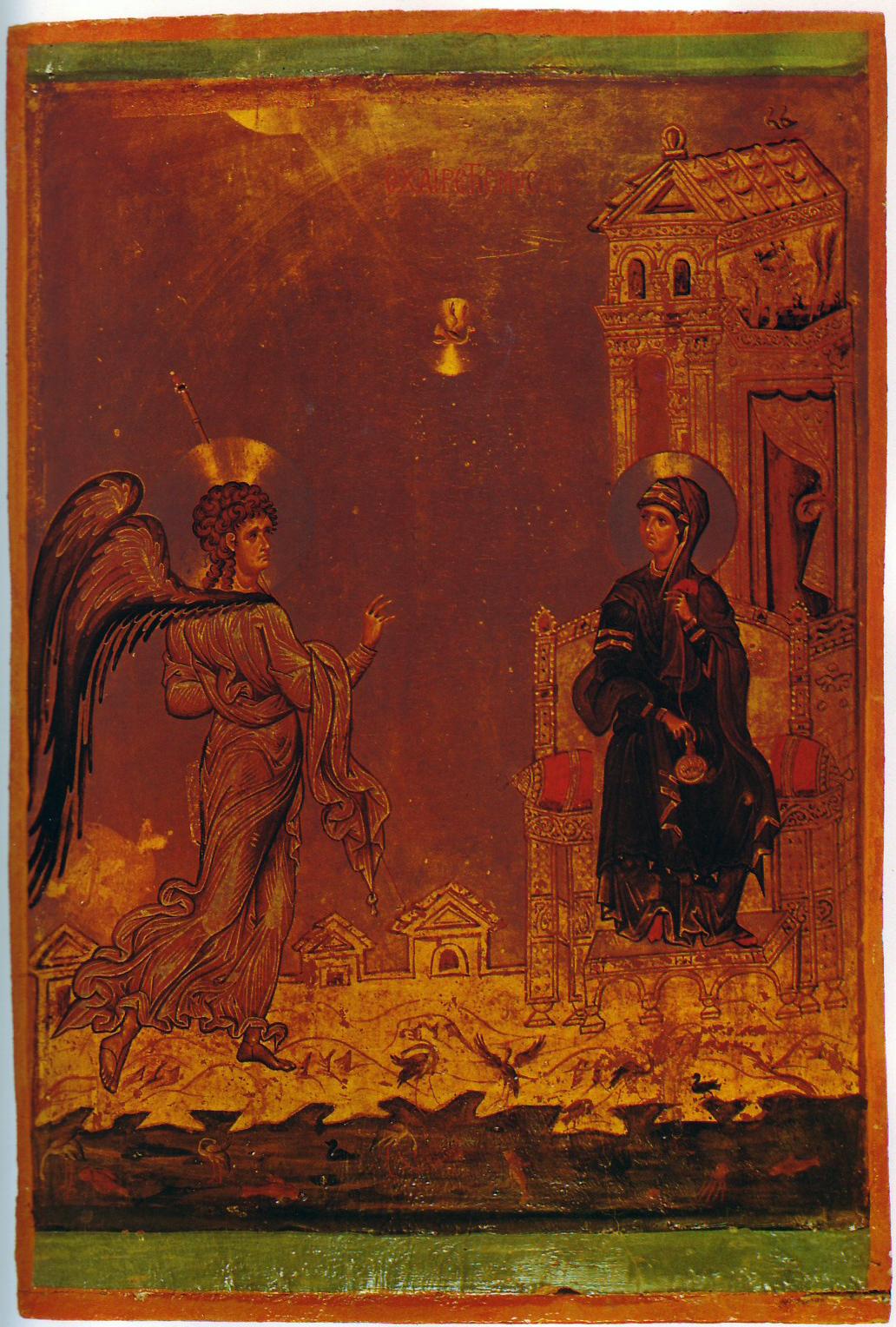
Byzantine Icon from St. Catherine's Monastery, Sinai, Egypt

The Icon of the Annunciation in St. Catherine's Monastery in Sinai, Egypt is an unusual Byzantine icon attributed to the late twelfth century. The Annunciation icon is an example of the late Komnenian-era style and was likely produced in Constantinople. The icon, tempera on wood, is one of the largest icons on display at Saint Catherine's Monastery, at 61 cm high and 42.2 cm wide. Very similar Annunciation icons exist to help establish the date of the Sinai icon. One at Kurbinovo in North Macedonia, dated 1191, and the icon at Lagoudhere on Cyprus, dated 1192.

The icon has distinctive elements that lead art historians, such as Evans and Wixom, to suggest the icon may have been produced at Saint Catherine's Monastery itself rather than Constantinople. The Annunciation icon shares features found exclusively on other icons only at the Sinai monastery, such as the reflective circles scored in the surface of the gold and the grisaille medallion with the infant Christ on the Virgin Mary's breast.

== Iconography ==
The Annunciation icon is highly stylized and is striking for its unique emotional and dramatic quality. An exceptionally sophisticated piece, the icon is notable for its saturated golden tone and naturalism. Colors are used sparingly; deeply saturated blues and purples adorn the Virgin's garments and are used on the tips of the Angel Gabriel's wings as well. The remainder of the icon is finished in gold grisaille. Rotating discs enhance the glittering effect of the icon. The Holy Spirit and Word of God, symbolized as the dove surrounded by the shimmering gold medallion, is shown descending upon the Virgin Mary.

Gabriel's pose imitates the classical Maenad in form and style, and may be the Byzantine artist's allusion to Thucydides or Homer. Gabriel approaches the Virgin with a fluid running step. Gabriel is attired in flowing gold robes, done in striation that invigorates the angel's garment. The Angel Gabriel's expression has been described as intensely troubled as he looks into the sad face of the Virgin, anticipating her sorrows.

Depicting the Virgin Mary in a landscape setting, with the river at her feet, is exceptional in Byzantine art. The Virgin, sitting regally upon her throne, holds in her left hand the red fabric of the temple veil. The infant Christ is barely visible, traced by a gold mandorla or nimbus, upon the Virgin's upper body. Mary touches the baby in utero, with the same hand holding the red material, linking the Veil of the Temple to Christ. These iconographic details emphasize the theological rhetoric of the icon. The Virgin appears slender and frail, looking somewhat apprehensive at the approaching angel.

The Byzantine artist has embellished the Annunciation Icon with motifs of spring and fertility. The river teems with various aquatic creatures. Spring motifs depict birds nesting on the rooftops, trees sprouting foliage, the flowing river freed from winter, underneath the golden glowing sun. Symbolism of fertility is reflected by the pair of storks on the rooftop and the river alive with fish, visual reminders that Christ's conception was at springtime. The spring date of the Feast of the Annunciation encouraged writers and artists to connect the feast's theme with natural symbolic representations of renewal.

Beyond the river, gradations of gold background blend into the golden architectural buildings on the icon. The lower buildings in the foreground are thought to represent Nazareth, the hometown of the Virgin Mary. The Virgin's golden house is an elegant church style structure. The marriage veil displayed in the window is drawn back. Atop the Virgin's house is a rooftop garden alluding to the rhetoric of the Song of Solomon (4:12) and is associated with Mary's virginity. The Virgin's house reflects fertility symbolized by the two storks nesting atop the roof.
