= Echo sounding =

Method of measuring the depth of water

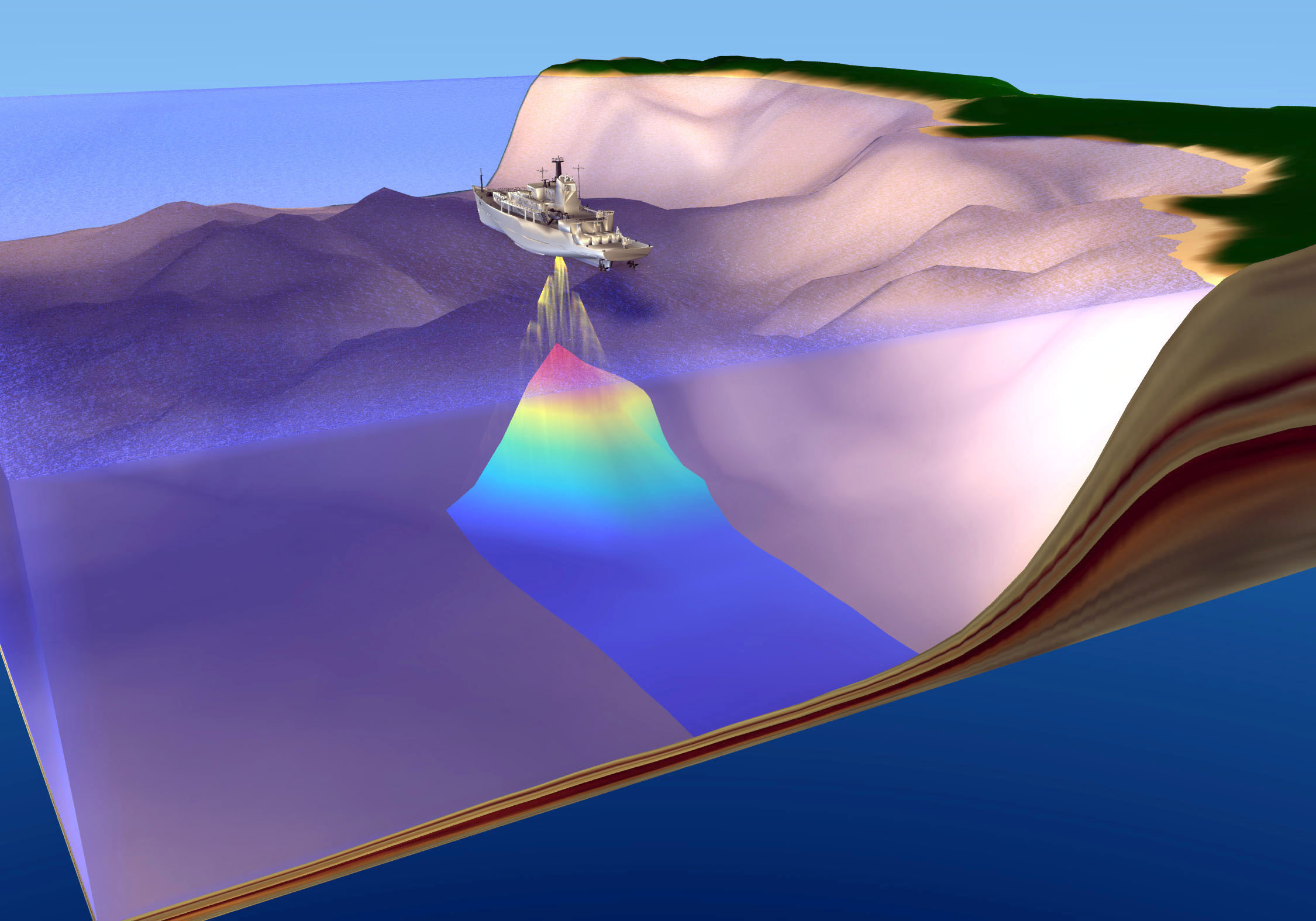
Illustration of echo sounding using a multibeam echosounder.

The MTVZA sounder received from the Meteor M2-2 satellite by an amateur station

Echo sounding or depth sounding is the use of sonar for ranging, normally to determine the depth of water (bathymetry). It involves transmitting acoustic waves into water and recording the time interval between emission and return of a pulse; the resulting time of flight, along with knowledge of the speed of sound in water, allows determining the distance between sonar and target. This information is then typically used for navigation purposes or in order to obtain depths for charting purposes.

Echo sounding can also be used for ranging to other targets, such as fish schools. Hydroacoustic assessments have traditionally employed mobile surveys from boats to evaluate fish biomass and spatial distributions. Conversely, fixed-location techniques use stationary transducers to monitor passing fish.

The word sounding is used for all types of depth measurements, including those that don't use sound, and is unrelated in origin to the word sound in the sense of noise or tones. Echo sounding is a more rapid method of measuring depth than the previous technique of lowering a sounding line until it touched bottom.

== History ==
German inventor Alexander Behm was granted German patent No. 282009 for the invention of echo sounding (device for measuring depths of the sea and distances and headings of ships or obstacles by means of reflected sound waves) on 22 July 1913. Meanwhile, in France, physicist Paul Langevin (connected with Marie Curie and better known for his research work in nuclear physics) was recruited by French Navy laboratories at the beginning of World War 1 and conducted (then secret) research on active sonars for anti-submarine warfare (using a piezoelectric transmitter). His work was developed and implemented by other scientists and technicians such as Chilowski, Florisson and Pierre Marti. Though a fully operational échosondeur (sonar) was not ready for use in wartime, there were successful trials both off Toulon and in the English Channel as early as 1920, and French patents taken for civilian uses. Oceanographic ships and French high-sea fishing assistance vessels were equipped with Langevin-Florisson and Langevin Marti recording sonars as early as the mid/late 1920s.

One of the first commercial echo sounding units was the Fessenden Fathometer, which used the Fessenden oscillator to generate sound waves. This was first installed by the Submarine Signal Company in 1924 on the M&M liner SS Berkshire.

== Technique ==
Diagram showing the basic principle of echo sounding

Geometry of the footprint: $\text{d} = 2 \cdot \tan(\alpha/2) \cdot \text{h}$

Distance is measured by multiplying half the time from the signal's outgoing pulse to its return by the speed of sound in water, which is approximately 1.5 kilometres per second (0.93 mi/s). The speed of sound will vary slightly depending on temperature, pressure and salinity; and for precise applications of echosounding, such as hydrography, the speed of sound must also be measured, typically by deploying a sound velocity probe in the water. Echo sounding is a special purpose application of sonar used to locate the bottom. Since a historical pre-SI unit of water depth was the fathom, an instrument used for determining water depth is sometimes called a fathometer.

Most charted ocean depths are based on an average or standard sound speed. Where greater accuracy is required, average and even seasonal standards may be applied to ocean regions. For high accuracy depths, usually restricted to special purpose or scientific surveys, a sensor may be lowered to measure the temperature, pressure and salinity. These factors are used to estimate more accurately the actual sound speed in the local water column. This technique is often used by the US Office of Coast Survey for navigational surveys of US coastal waters.

== Types ==
=== Single beam ===
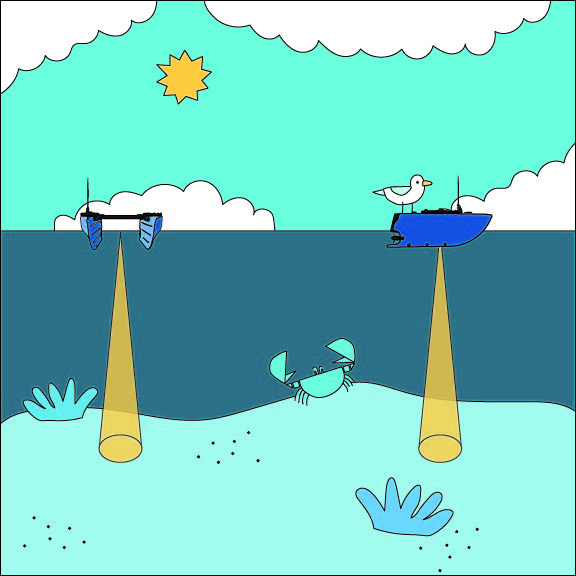
beam shape of a single-beam echosounder on a USV

A single-beam echo sounder is one of the simplest and most fundamental types of underwater sonar. They are ubiquitous in the boating world and used on a number of different marine robotic vehicles. It operates by using a transducer to emit a pulse through the water and listen for echoes to return. Using that data, it's able to determine the distance from the strongest echo, which can be the seafloor, a concrete structure, or other larger obstacle. A fishfinder is an echo sounding device used by both recreational and commercial fishers.

=== Multibeam ===
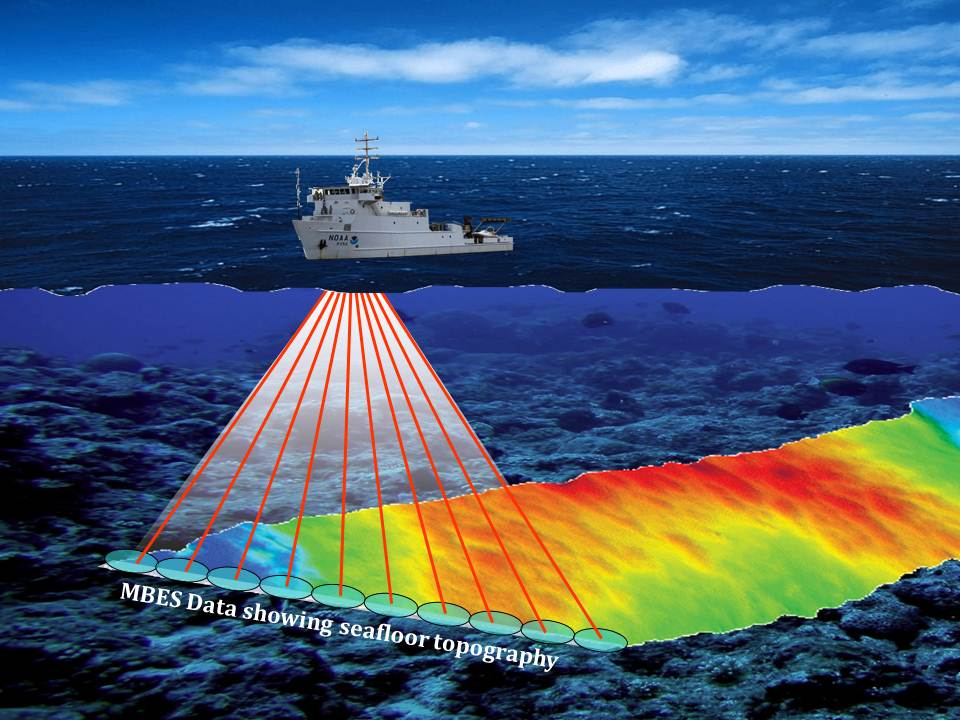
Multibeam sonar is used to map the ocean floor

A multibeam echosounder (MBES) is a type of sonar that is used to map the seabed. It emits acoustic waves in a fan shape beneath its transceiver. The time it takes for the sound waves to reflect off the seabed and return to the receiver is used to calculate the water depth. Unlike other sonars and echo sounders, MBES uses beamforming to extract directional information from the returning soundwaves, producing a swathe of depth soundings from a single ping.

== Common use ==
As well as an aid to navigation (most larger vessels will have at least a simple depth sounder), echo sounding is commonly used for fishing. Variations in elevation often represent places where fish congregate. Schools of fish will also register.

== Hydrography ==
In areas where detailed bathymetry is required, a precise echo sounder may be used for the work of hydrography. There are many considerations when evaluating such a system, not limited to the vertical accuracy, resolution, acoustic beamwidth of the transmit/receive beam and the acoustic frequency of the transducer.

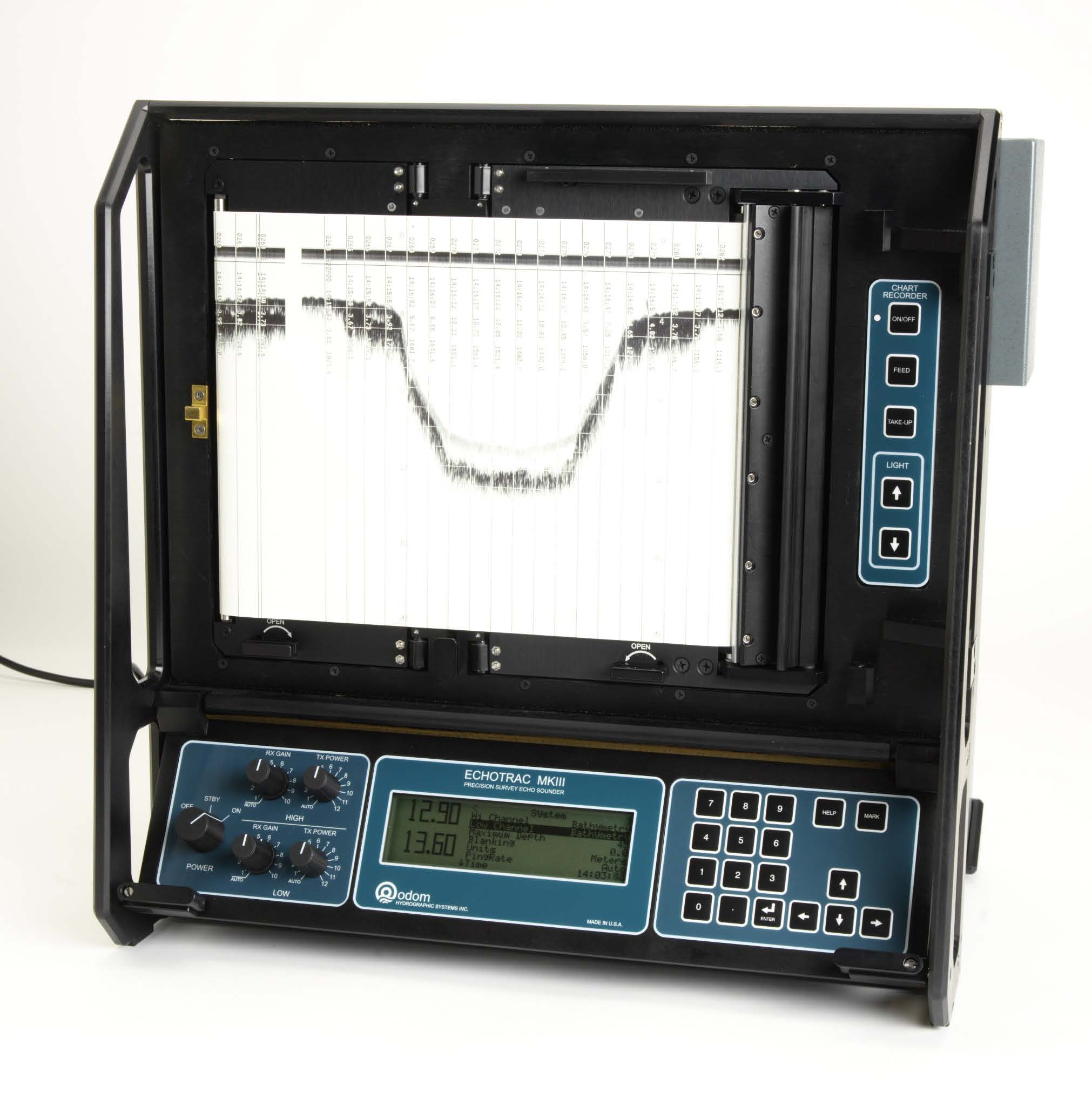
An example of a precision dual frequency echosounder, the Teledyne Odom MkIII

The majority of hydrographic echosounders are dual frequency, meaning that a low frequency pulse (typically around 24 kHz) can be transmitted at the same time as a high frequency pulse (typically around 200 kHz). As the two frequencies are discrete, the two return signals do not typically interfere with each other. Dual frequency echosounding has many advantages, including the ability to identify a vegetation layer or a layer of soft mud on top of a layer of rock.

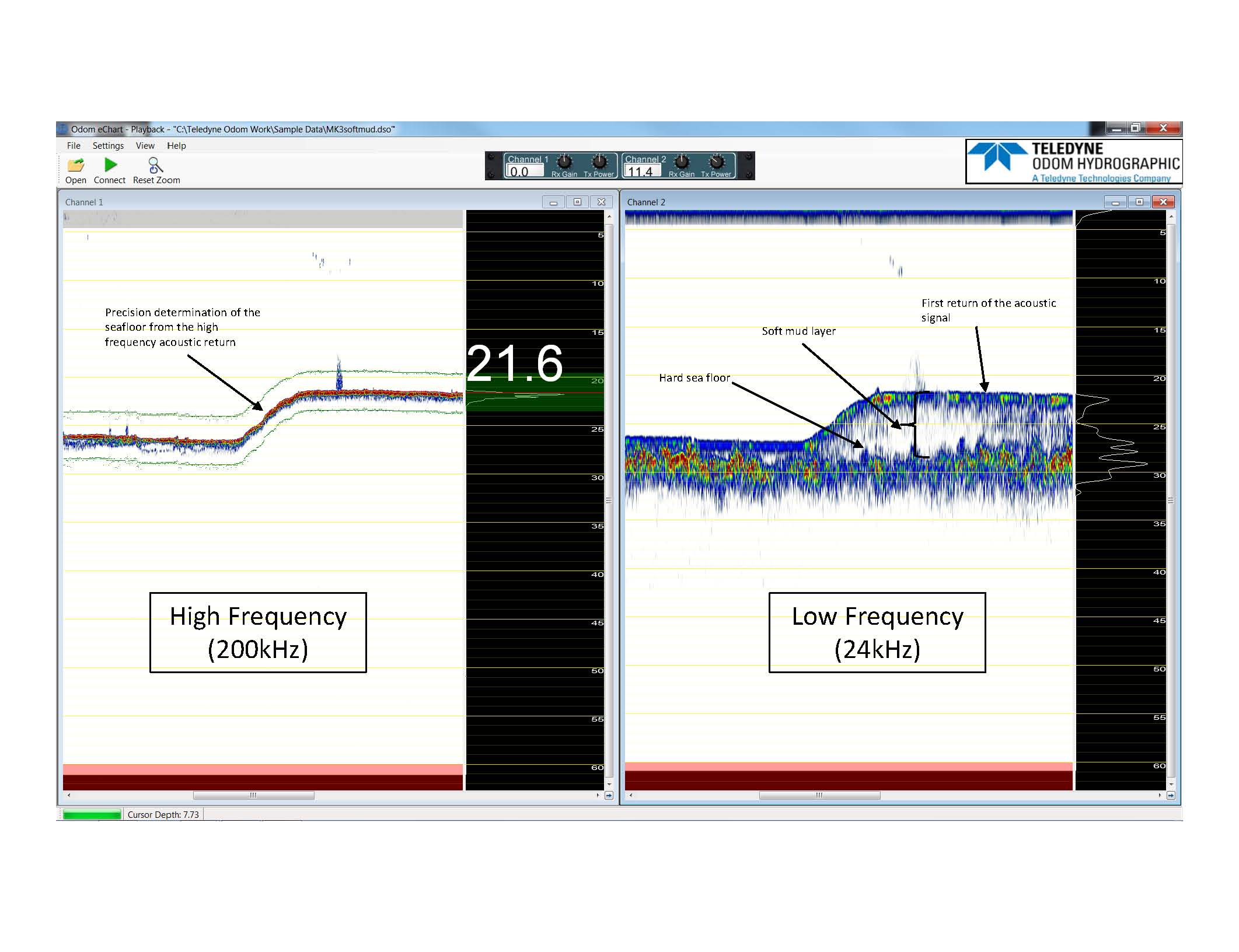
A screen grab of the difference between single and dual frequency echograms

Most hydrographic operations use a 200 kHz transducer, which is suitable for inshore work up to 100 metres in depth. Deeper water requires a lower frequency transducer as the acoustic signal of lower frequencies is less susceptible to attenuation in the water column. Commonly used frequencies for deep water sounding are 33 kHz and 24 kHz.

The beamwidth of the transducer is also a consideration for the hydrographer, as to obtain the best resolution of the data gathered a narrow beamwidth is preferable. The higher the operating frequency, the narrower the beamwidth. Therefore, it is especially important when sounding in deep water, as the resulting footprint of the acoustic pulse can be very large once it reaches a distant sea floor.

A multispectral multibeam echosounder is an extension of a dual frequency vertical beam echosounder in that, as well as measuring two soundings directly below the sonar at two different frequencies; it measures multiple soundings at multiple frequencies, at multiple different grazing angles, and multiple different locations on the seabed. These systems are detailed further in the section called multibeam echosounder.

Echo sounders are used in laboratory applications to monitor sediment transport, scour and erosion processes in scale models (hydraulic models, flumes etc.). These can also be used to create plots of 3D contours.

=== Standards for hydrographic echo sounding ===
The required precision and accuracy of the hydrographic echo sounder is defined by the requirements of the International Hydrographic Organization (IHO) for surveys that are to be undertaken to IHO standards. These values are contained within IHO publication S44.

In order to meet these standards, the surveyor must consider not only the vertical and horizontal accuracy of the echo sounder and transducer, but the survey system as a whole. A motion sensor may be used, specifically the heave component (in single beam echosounding) to reduce soundings for the motion of the vessel experienced on the water's surface. Once all of the uncertainties of each sensor are established, the hydrographer will create an uncertainty budget to determine whether the survey system meets the requirements laid down by IHO.

Different hydrographic organisations will have their own set of field procedures and manuals to guide their surveyors to meet the required standards. Two examples are the US Army Corps of Engineers publication EM110-2-1003, and the NOAA 'Field Procedures Manual'.

== See also ==
- Acoustical oceanography
- Alexander Behm – inventor
- AUV
- Bathymeter
- Depth gauge
- Fessenden oscillator
- Fisheries acoustics
- Hydroacoustics
- Hydrographic survey
- Sonar
- Depth sounding
- Underwater acoustics
