= Church of St. George, Kurbinovo =

Macedonian Orthodox church in Kurbinovo, North Macedonia

Church of St. George
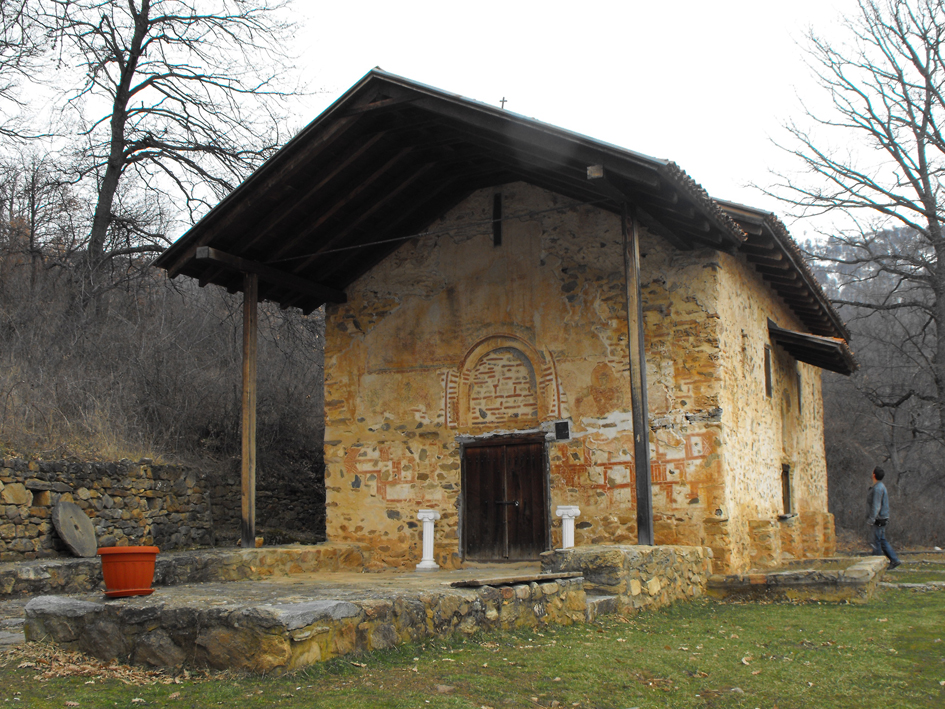
- Front view of the church

Religion
- Affiliation: Macedonian Orthodox Church

Location
- Location: Kurbinovo, Resen Municipality, North Macedonia
- Interactive map of Church of St. George
- Coordinates: 40°59′09″N 21°05′06″E

Architecture
- Style: Byzantine architecture
- Completed: est. 1191

The Church of St. George (Macedonian: Црква Св. Ѓорѓи) is a 12th-century Macedonian Orthodox church located 2 km away from the village of Kurbinovo in North Macedonia. Excavations have shown that the building has once belonged to a settlement, which was abandoned at the end of the 18th century for the present-day village of Kurbinovo. According to the research made on the church's frescoes, it is supposed that the church was built in the year 1191 by the Byzantines. The church is a "monument of culture" in the Republic of North Macedonia and protected by law. It is also a part of the Prespa - Pelagonia diocese of the Macedonian Orthodox Church.

== Dating ==
Not much is known about the first centuries of the church. Only a painted inscription on the eastern side of the altar mentions the 25th of April 1191 as the beginning of the fresco paintings under the first reign of Isaac II Angelos (1185/95-1203/04). This epigraphic hint was discovered in 1958 during conservation work and confirms the assumption of M. Radivoje Ljubinković in 1940. Previous publications have dated the frescos to the 16th century. The year specification of 1191 could also hint to the edification of the church, which could be dated between the years 1185 and 1190 due to its simple architecture and its small dimensions.

The inscription on the altar neither gives any clue about the circumstances, under which the church was erected, nor the names of the donor and the painter. No further written sources are known. However the donor's portrait could give information about the social rank of the founder. Unfortunately, the scene is severely damaged, meaning there are no eponymously inscriptions and the faces of the four participants are unrecognizable. Due to the clothing and the dating of the frescos, one person is identified as Isaac II Angelos, the female as his wife Margaret of Hungary. The third figure could be John X Kamateros, archbishop of Ohrid, while the last participant is assumed to be his protégé. The latter had to be part of the higher circles, belonging to an influential group of nobles.

== Architecture ==
The building belongs with its dimensions (15x7m) to one of the biggest aisleless churches of North Macedonia and is hardly representative regarding its architecture. It consists of a rectangular nave and a semicircular apse in the east, which has a throne integrated at its centre. In front of it is a monolithic, cubic altar. The area of the bema is slightly heightened by two elevations of the floor.

The main entrance is situated in the west, while there is one door each in the lateral walls. The northern one is almost at the height of the windows as this side of the church is limited by a slope. All three entrances are completed by a lunette and two archivolts. High up in the northern and southern walls are two windows located, each with round arches. Another pair is situated in the apse, while a seventh one can be found in the western gable zone. Two rectangular screens ensure incidence of light in the south wall.

The apse is flanked by one rectangular niche on each side, functioning symbolically as prothesis and diaconicon. Two rectangular deepenings are situated in the side walls of the bema zone. The one in the south is bricked-up and clearly positioned lower than its counterpart, but still taking away part of the painting of a bishop.

The walls consist of roughly trimmed stone, combined by mortar. Flatter stones and bricks are used irregularly around the lunettes and windows as well as for the apse. In the upper two-thirds of the eastern wall are two horizontal registers of brick incorporated, which reminds of the cloisonné technique, whereas the lower part is performed coarsely. Since the 11th century the facades of religious buildings in the Byzantine empire are designed more vividly and loosened up by niches, bricks and friezes. Especially the masonry in Kastoria was decorated by pricks forming patterns. Also the lunette with the double archivolt was very common in Byzantine architecture since the 11th century.

== Frescos ==
=== Facade ===
The church is not only decorated with paintings on the interior, but also on the facade. The cloisonné technique was used for the frescos on the western side imitating brickwork up to the height of the door lintel. Further brick mimicries can be found in the lower zone of the apse and the first archivolt of the southern door. The rest of the paintings are strongly washed out. Better preserved are the rider saints with their halos, shields and lances, who are flanking the western lunette. Above the left saint are the remains of two figures with splendid clothing and imperial footwear, above its counterpart another person can be noticed. A two-lined inscription is written on the first archivolt of the door. The illustration in the northern lunette is lost, but the geometrical and floral patterns around it are exceptionally well preserved. The first arc of the southern lunette shows brick imitations, while the central panel is decorated with the Deesis, enriched by George. To the right of the door are light traces of figures on a smaller scale, divided into four registers.

=== Interior ===
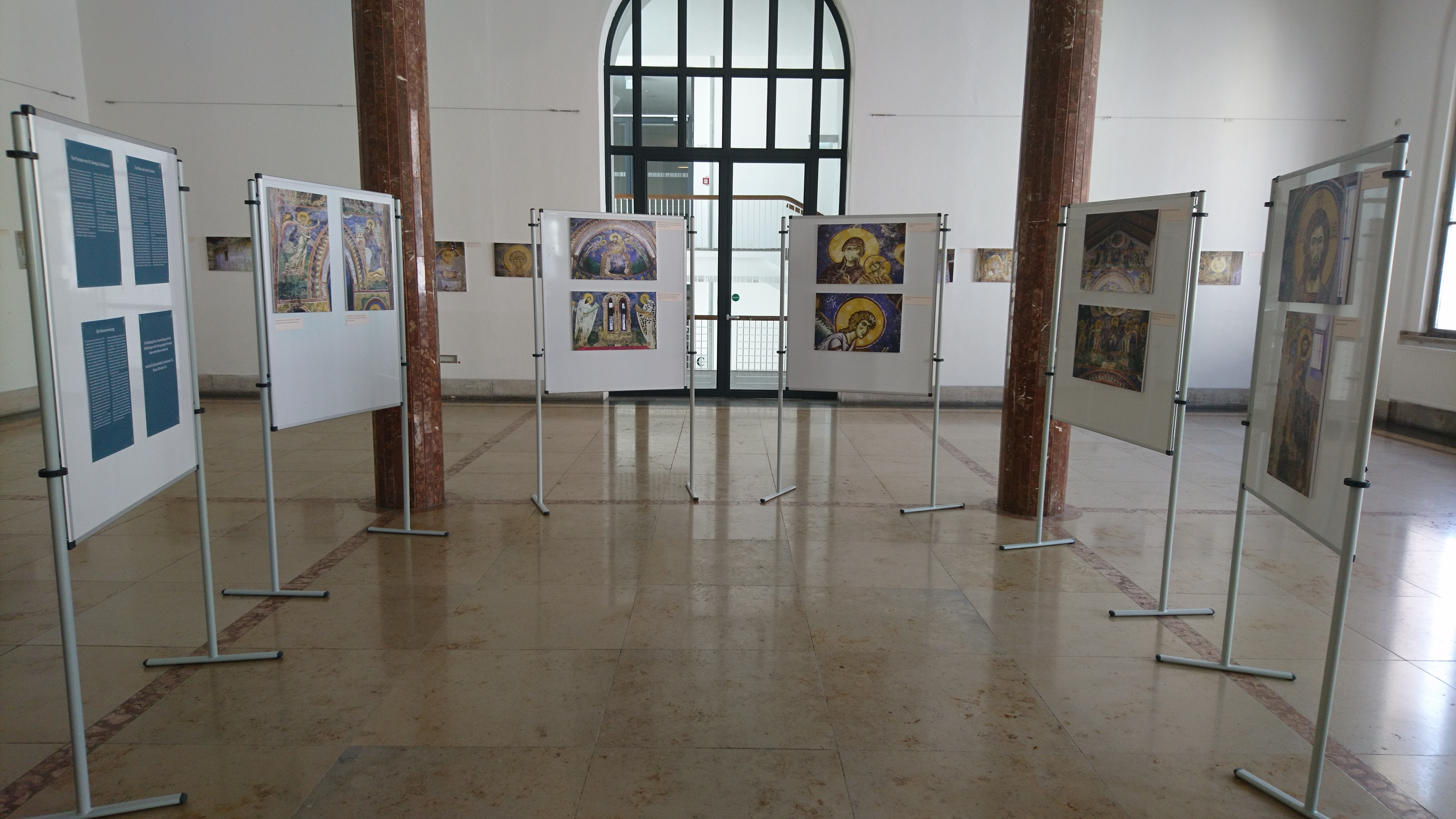
Exhibition on the frescos of the monastery at LMU Munich in 2018

The interior is covered with frescos from top to bottom, divided into three to five registers. Marble imitation is used for the lowest one, whereas the second stripe is filled with saints who are also depicted on the door lintels. The figures are usually arranged in a group of three people, for example Pantaleon, Cosmas and Damian. Constantine the Great and his mother Helena, a typical image in many churches, are portrayed on the southern wall. The most important female martyrs are represented by Thecla, Petka, Theodora, Barbara, Kyriaki and Catherine on the western wall, while Euphrosynus and the nursing Anne, mother of Mary, count as two of the oldest representations at all. A significant figure of the Christian mission is embodied by Saint Clement, whereas Cyril and Methodius stand for patrons of the Byzantine-Slavic culture. Next to the images of Cyril and Methodius, Greek inscriptions were found, which define them as "teachers of the Bulgarians" - (διδάσκαλος (τῶν) Βουλγάρων).

The cycle of Christ in the register above starts at the triumphal arch with the Annunciation. Gabriel is constituted on the left side of the conch, Mary on its right. The sequence continues on the southern wall: Visitation, conversation between Mary and Elizabeth, Nativity, Presentation at the Temple, Baptism and Raising of Lazarus. The passion is introduced on the western wall by the Entry into Jerusalem, followed by the Transfiguration, which is normally depicted after the Baptism. Entry and Transfiguration are interrupted by the Dormition above the western entrance. The cycle follows up on the northern wall: Crucifixion, Descent from the Cross, Entombment, Women at the tomb and Harrowing of Hell. The series ends with the Ascension on the eastern gable zone. Its counterpart shows the Pentecost. Below is a depiction of the Theophany, using the full width of the wall. Two monumental icons of Christ and George facing each other are portrayed at the first elevation of the floor.

Thirty prophets, who are announcing the coming of Christ, are depicted in the fourth register, but only on the lateral walls. Two figures to the far east of the masonry wear the same imperial footwear as the persons on the western facade.

The conch of the apse is framed by ornaments and an inscription, showing in its centre the enthroned Mary with the Christ Child on her lap, flanked by Michael and Gabriel. Below are eight church fathers walking towards the newborn Christ, who is lying on an altar for his ritual sacrifice. This image is shown here for the first time in Byzantine art and therefore contributing to the development of the variety of scenes. The theme came up because of the since the second half of the 11th century existing discussion in Constantinople about the eucharistical sacrifice and is portrayed again and again until the Middle Ages. Some door lintels and window frames have a decoration reminding of marble. A similar presentation could have been used for the altar and the throne.

The iconographic program is normally used in churches with a dome. Since the building in Kurbinovo is only covered by a gable roof, the representations had to be adjusted to the room. This can be seen in the prophets, who are usually depicted in the tambour, now portrayed on the upper lateral walls, or the Theophany in the fourth register of the western wall.

=== Painters and style ===
The frescoes in the church are considered one of the best known Byzantine paintings of the Macedonian Renaissance. It seems that at least three painters were responsible for the iconographic program, but their identities remain unknown. However a difference in their skills can be noticed. The ablest one portrayed the icons of Christ and George as well as the scenes on the upper eastern wall. The second artist painted the lateral walls, whereas the most ungifted created the illustrations on the western wall, the lower zone of the eastern and a part of the northern wall. It is assumed that local artists have participated in the project and that the masters decorated the church of the saints Cosmas and Damian in the not far away situated settlement Kastoria in 1180.

The style of the frescos is that of the last development phase of komnenian art, but small deviations of the regular strict symmetry can be registered in the church of Kurbinovo. More features of the painters become noticeable in the lengthened bodies and the blankness of the faces. Instead the restless drapery of the clothing is used to express the emotional life of the figures with exception of the most ungifted painter who shows the grief about the passing of the Mother of God openly on the faces of the participants.

== State of preservation and alterations ==
The frescos in the church's interior have lost its colour intensity, except those on the eastern wall. The first zone with marble imitation is gone between the throne and the southern door. Humidity has destroyed almost all holy figures on the southern wall, because this one is not protected by a slope like its counterpart.

Not being part of the original decoration is the rider saint Demetrius on the northern door soffit. He is dated to the end of the 16th or the beginning of the 17th century. Dated to the latter century are also the paintings on the southern facade (except the ones in the lunette), but according to M. Milijković-Pepek they belong into the 14th century.

Shortly before the middle of the 19th century, a fire has damaged the church, in particular the southern wall. As a result, its porch was also destroyed. The following restoration in the year 1847 brought some unfortunate alterations, for example the damaging of the frescos in the upper parts of the church as the wooden ceiling was replaced, the bricking-up of the lateral doors, the addition of a porch at the western facade as well as the installation of two rectangular windows in the southern wall. The initial iconostasis was replaced by a new one and the frescos on the western facade got painted over with three rider saints.

Further conservation work was carried out in the first half of the 20th century. Later additions like the porch at the western wall were removed. In 1958, the following work was performed: removal of the ceiling and raising of the walls by 50 cm, opening of the lateral doors and renewal of the elevations of the floor. Furthermore, the paintings were cleared and restored as well as the original rider saints on the western facade uncovered.

In 2020, the church was added to North Macedonia's tentative list of World Heritage Sites.

== Gallery ==
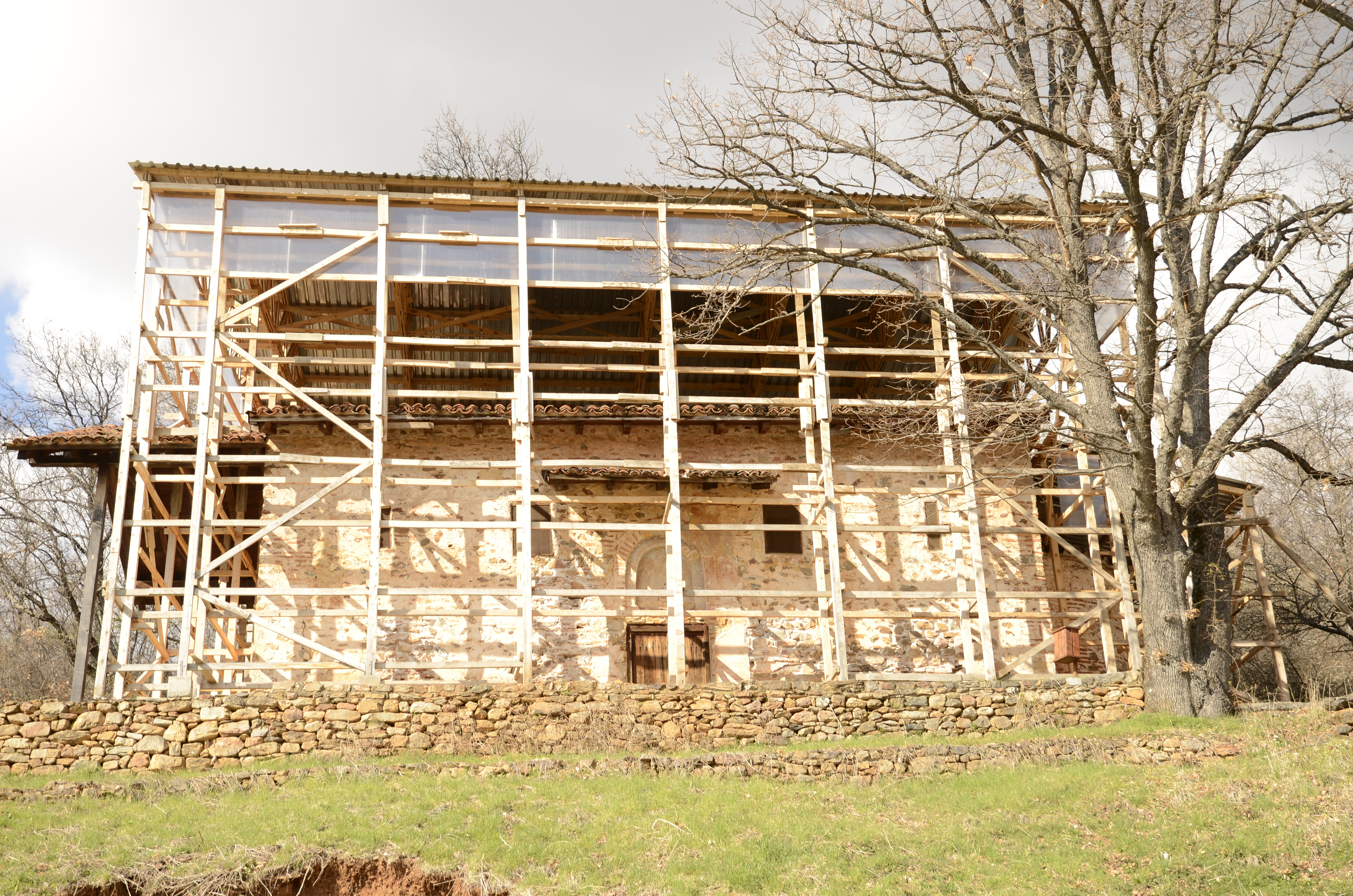
Southern side.

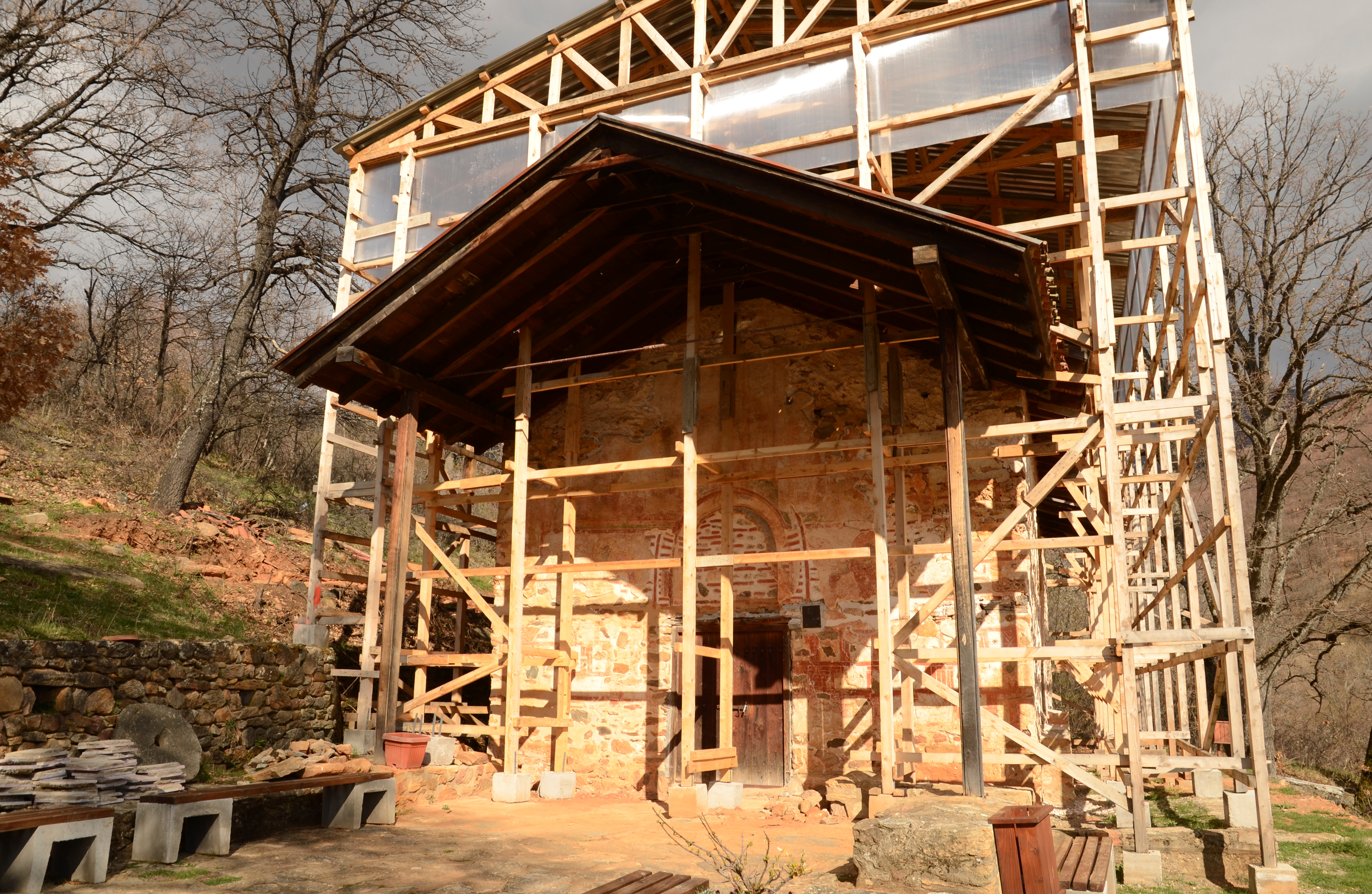
Western side.

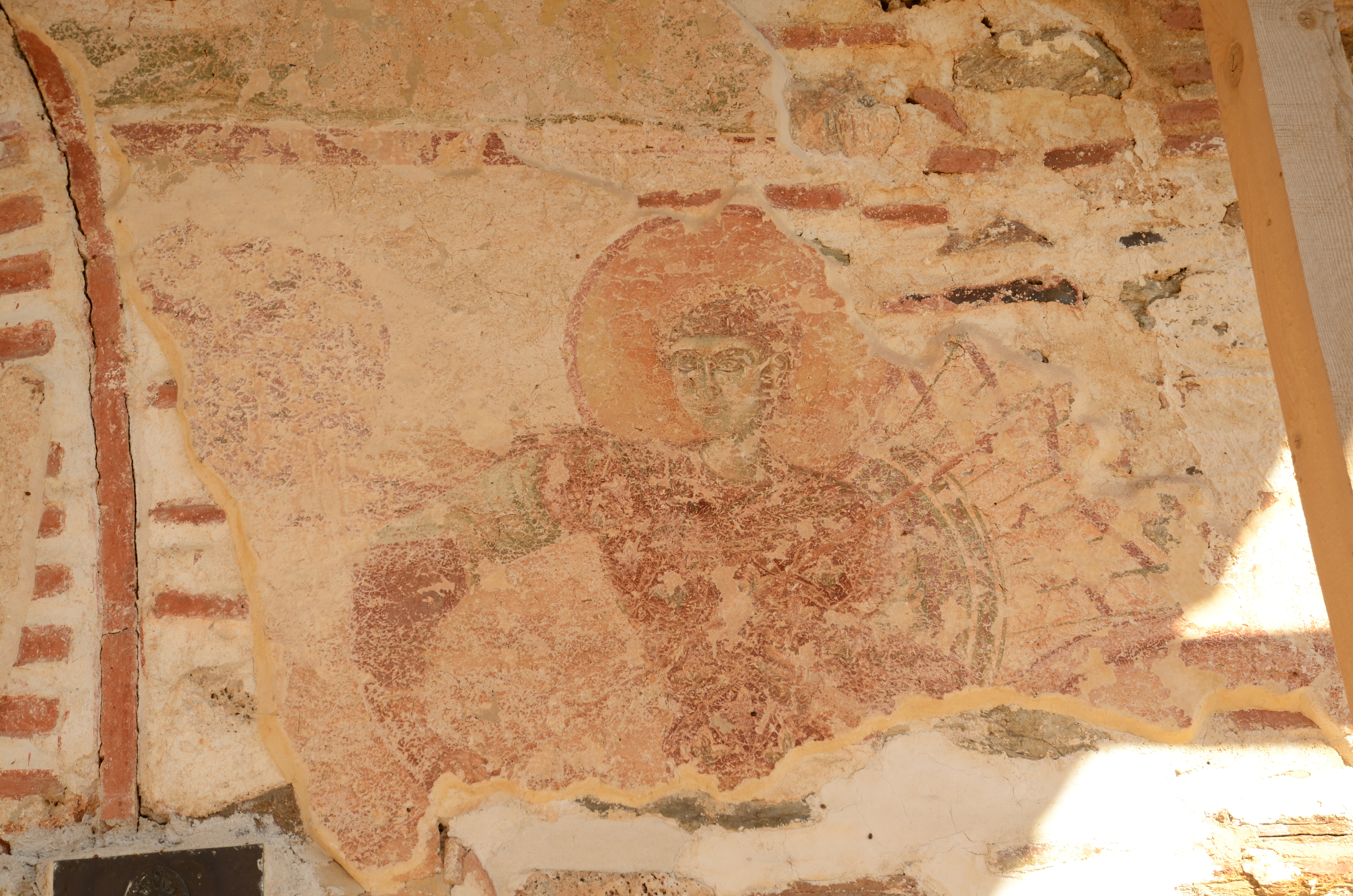
Rider saint on the western facade to the right of the main entrance.

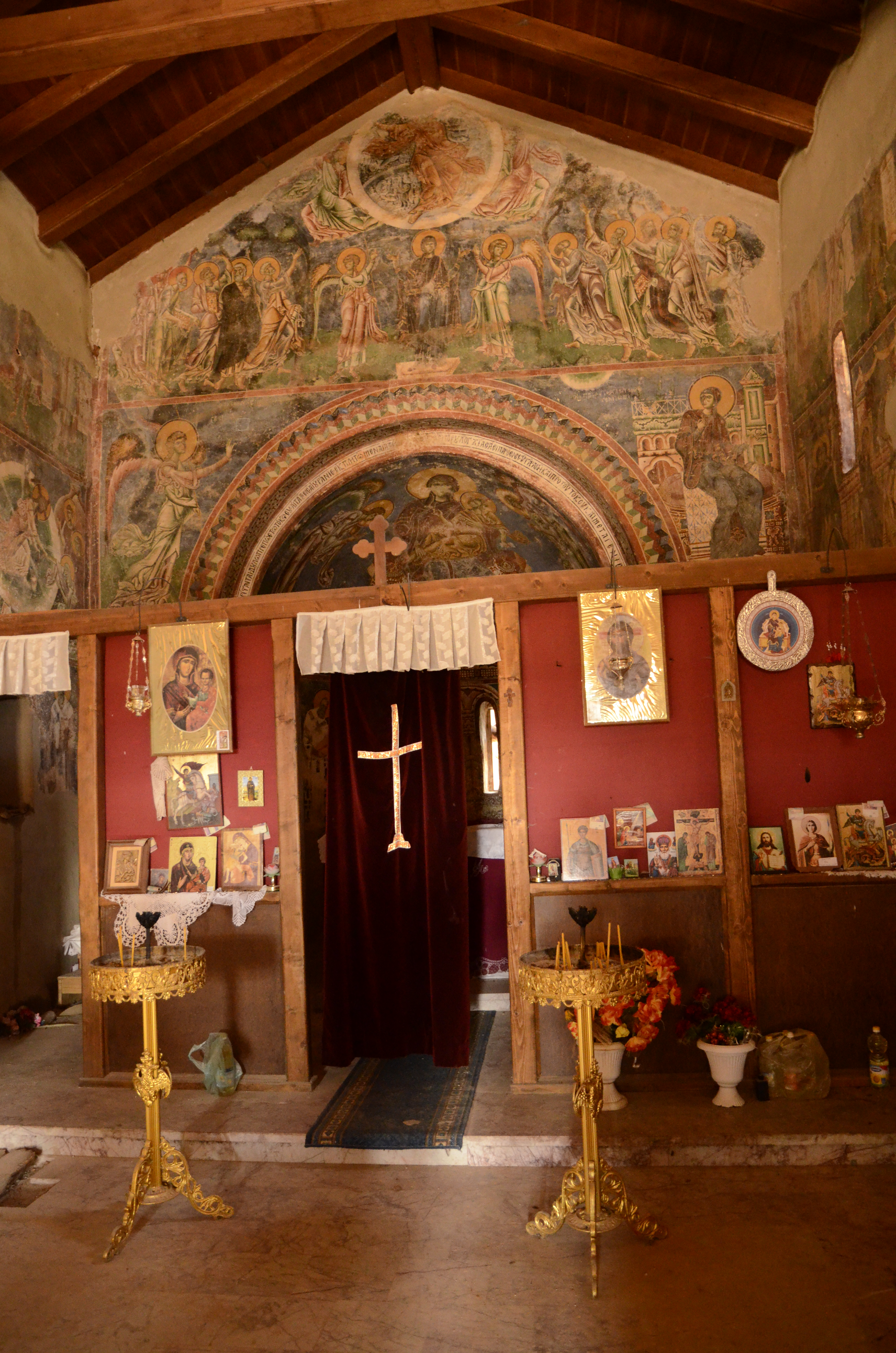
View to the iconostasis.

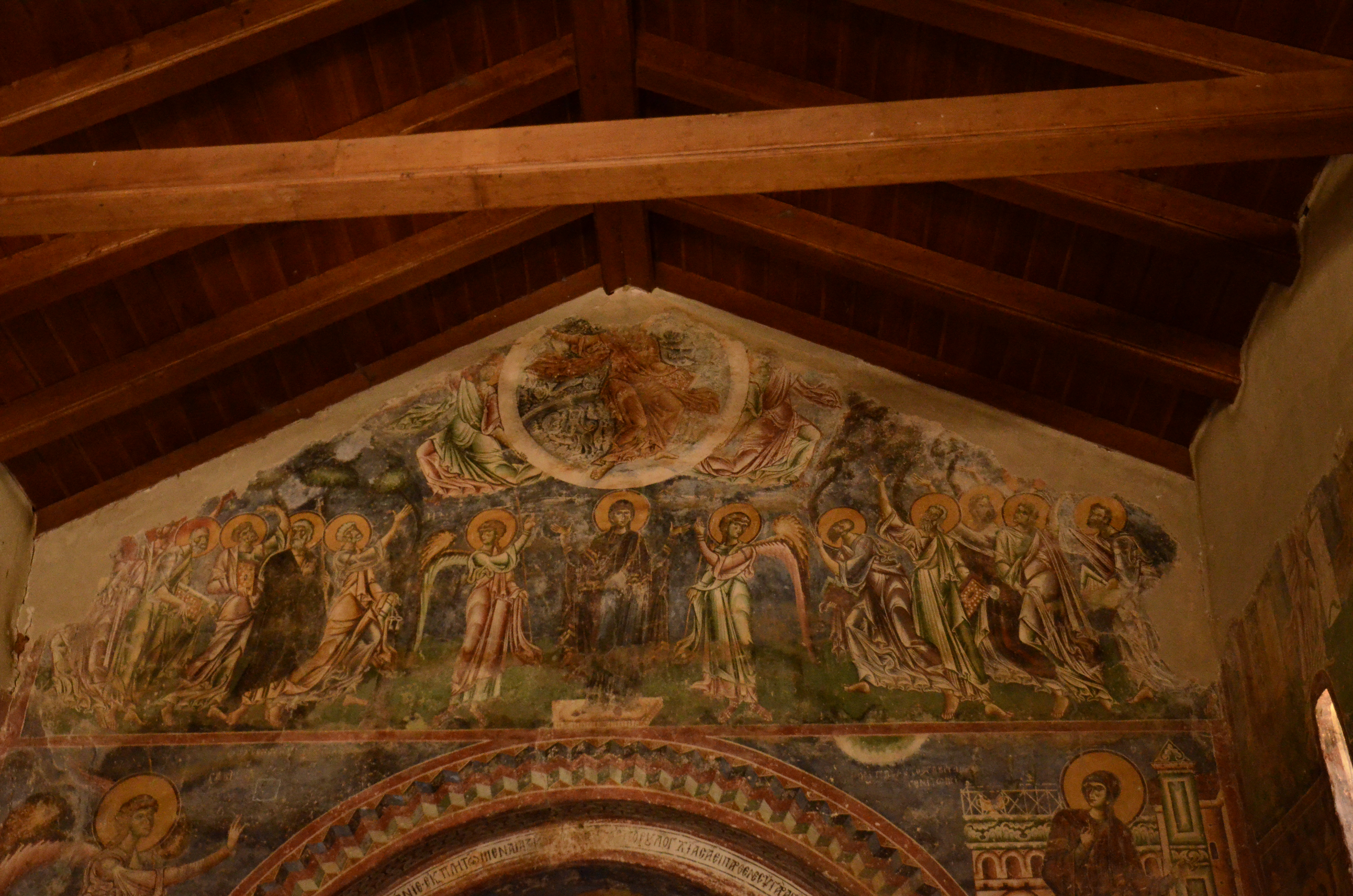
Frescos on the eastern wall.

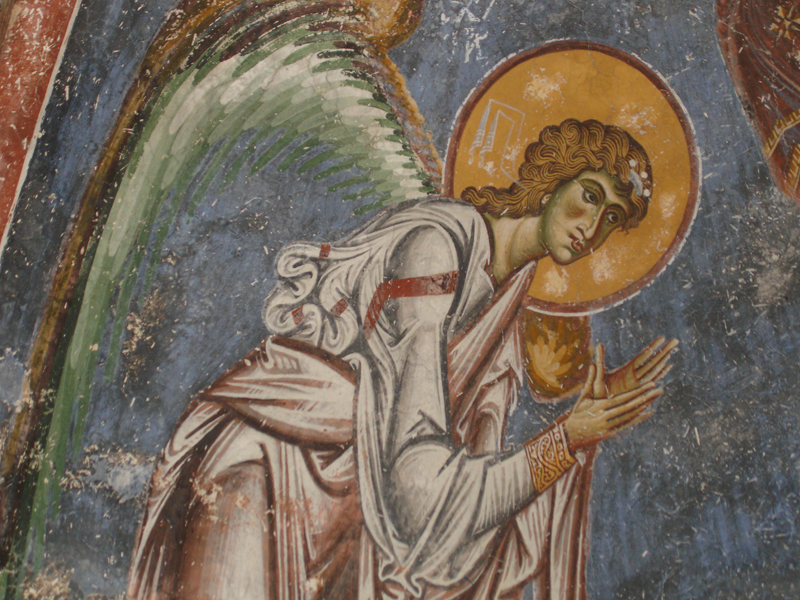
A fresco of Archangel Gabriel, which is also used on the Macedonian 50 denar banknote.

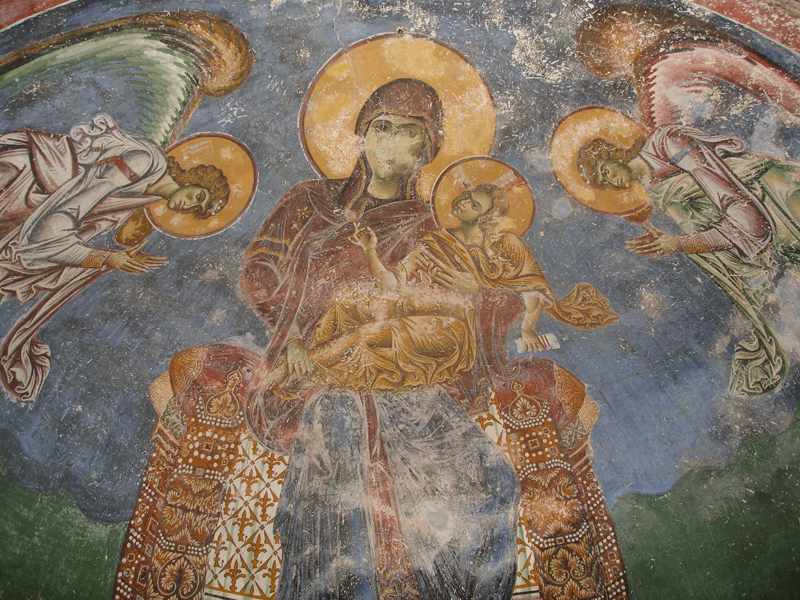
A fresco of Mary Mother of Jesus.

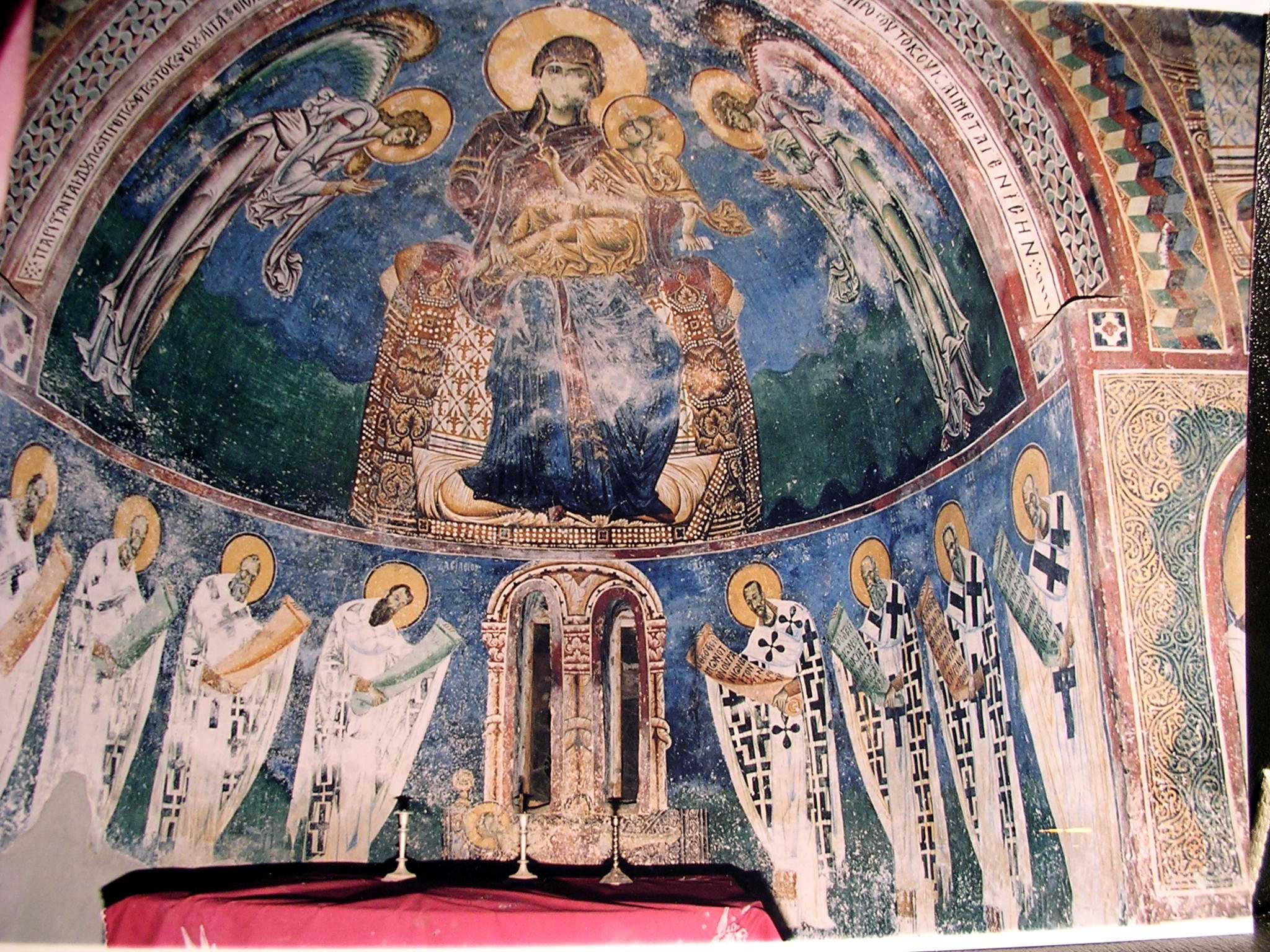
Front wall of the monastery.

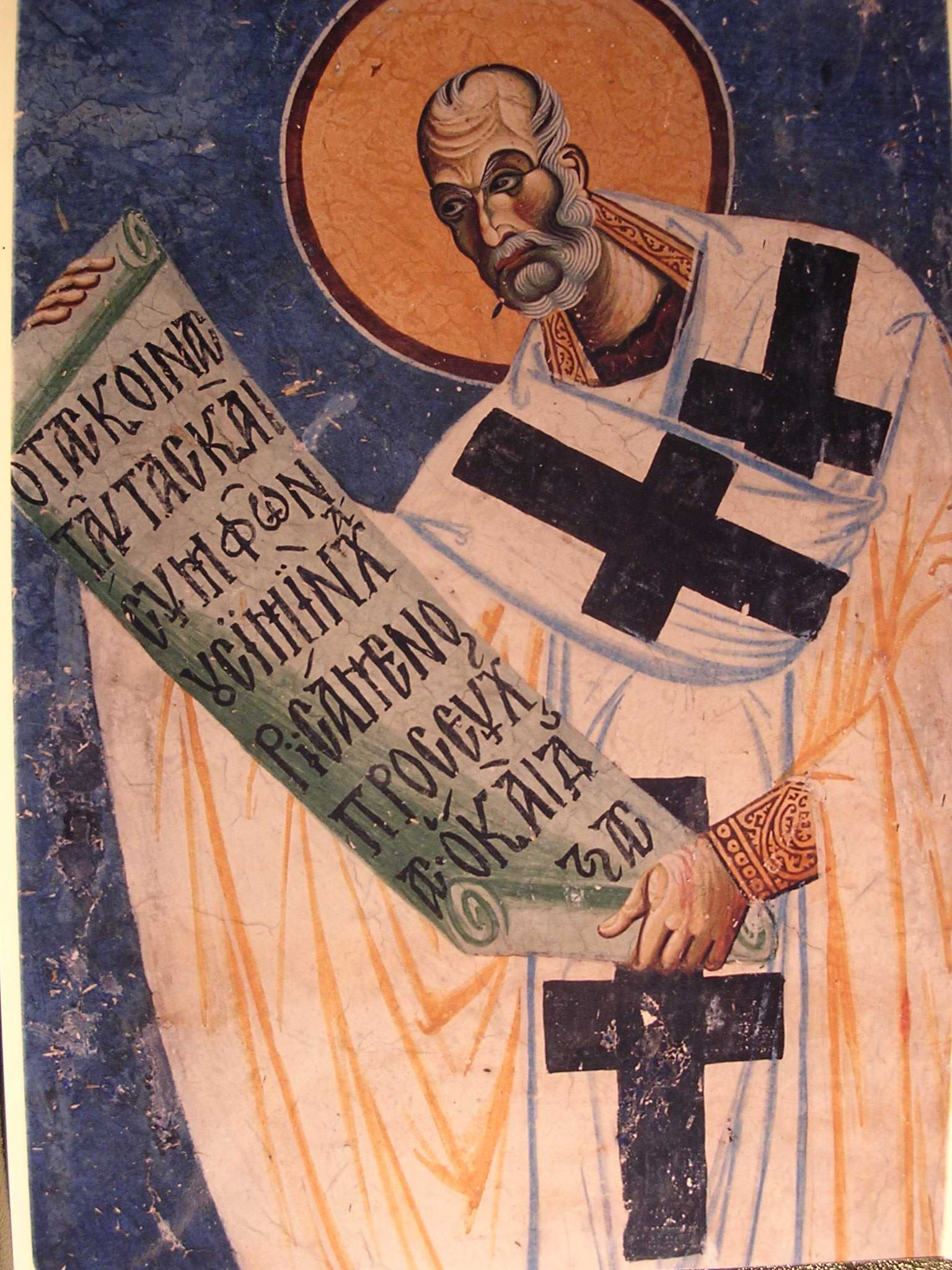
The fresco of St. George.

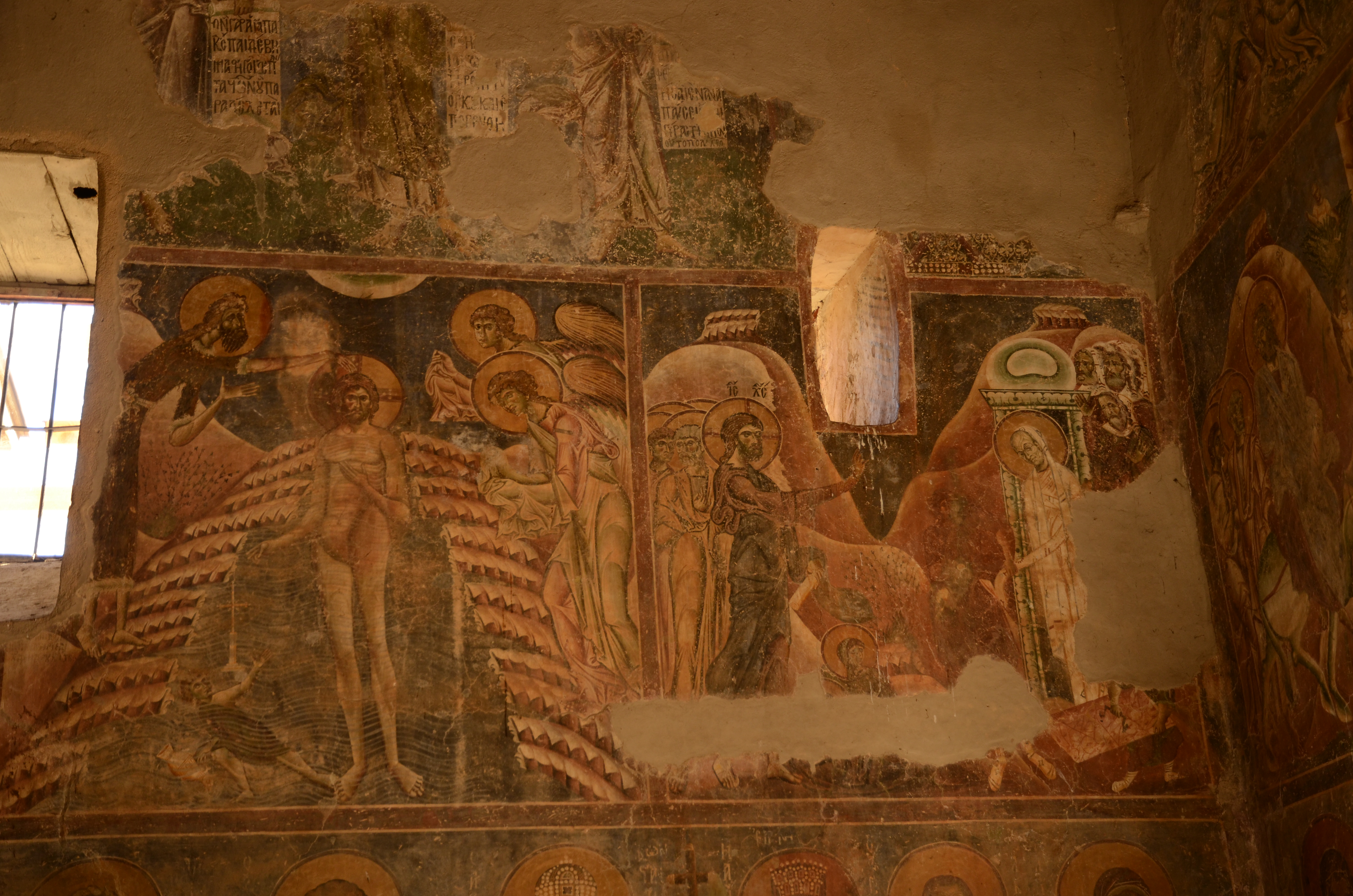
Baptism and Raising of Lazarus, southern wall.

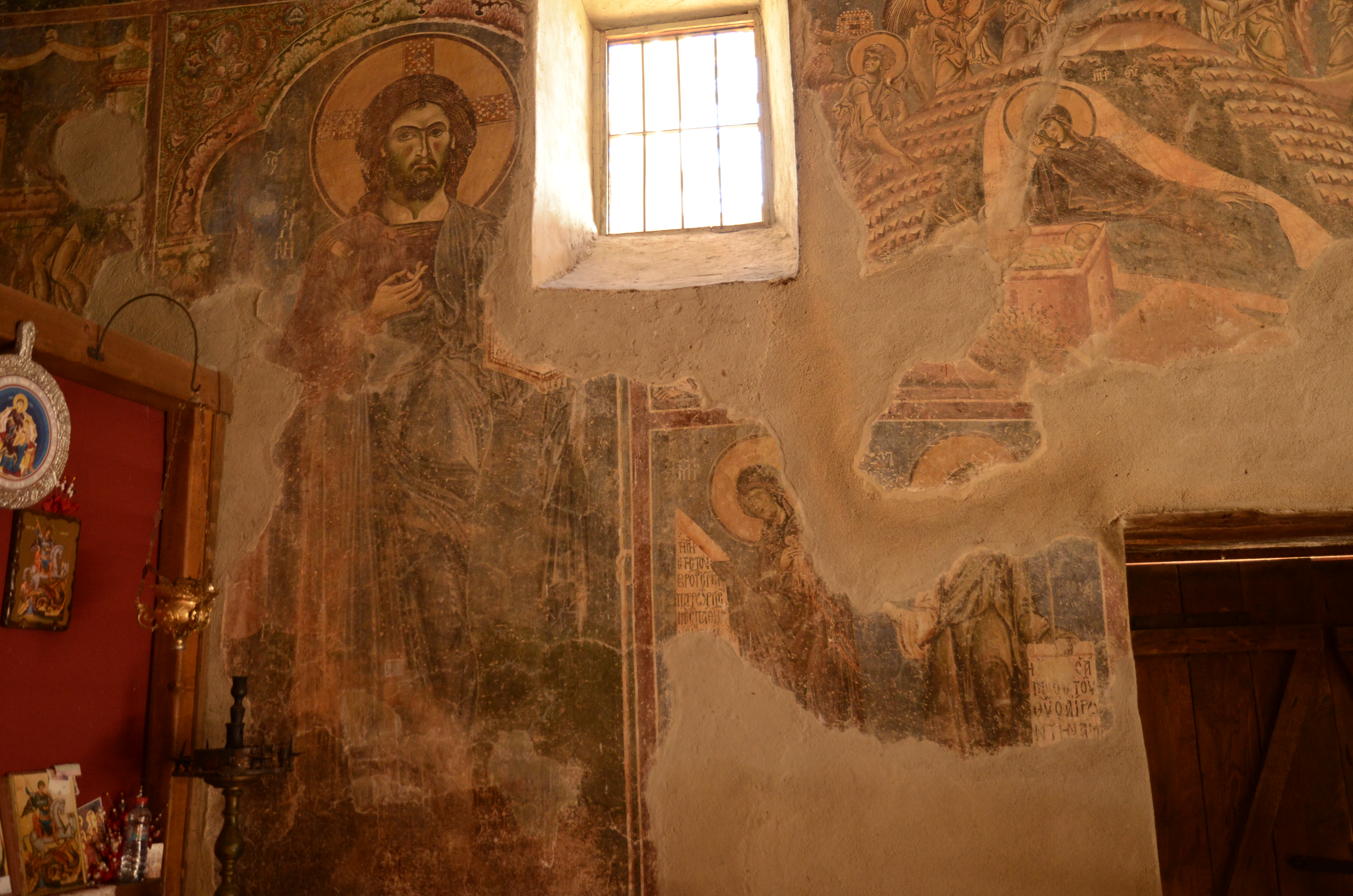
Icon of Christ and Nativity, southern wall.

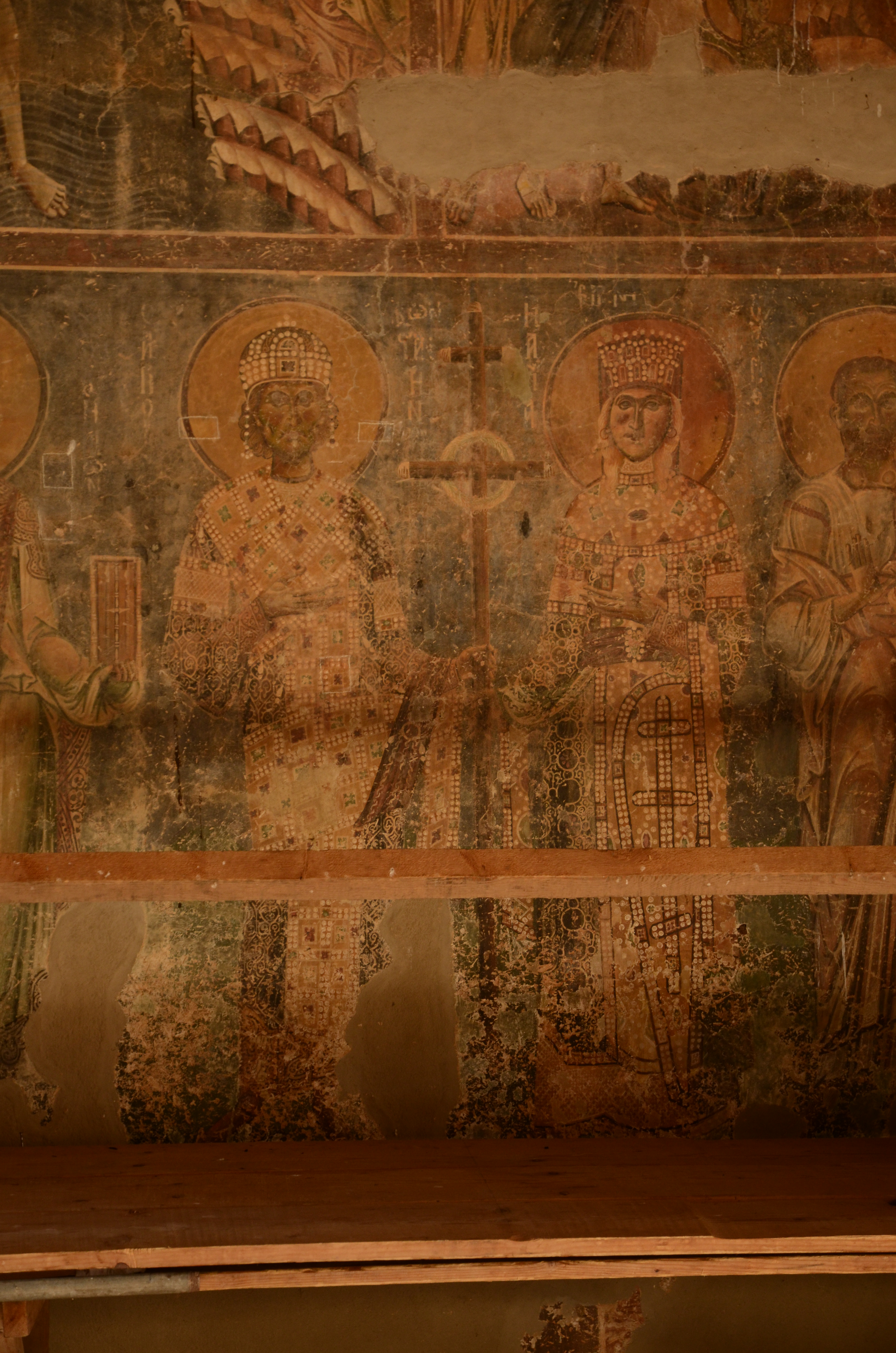
Constantine and Helena, southern wall.

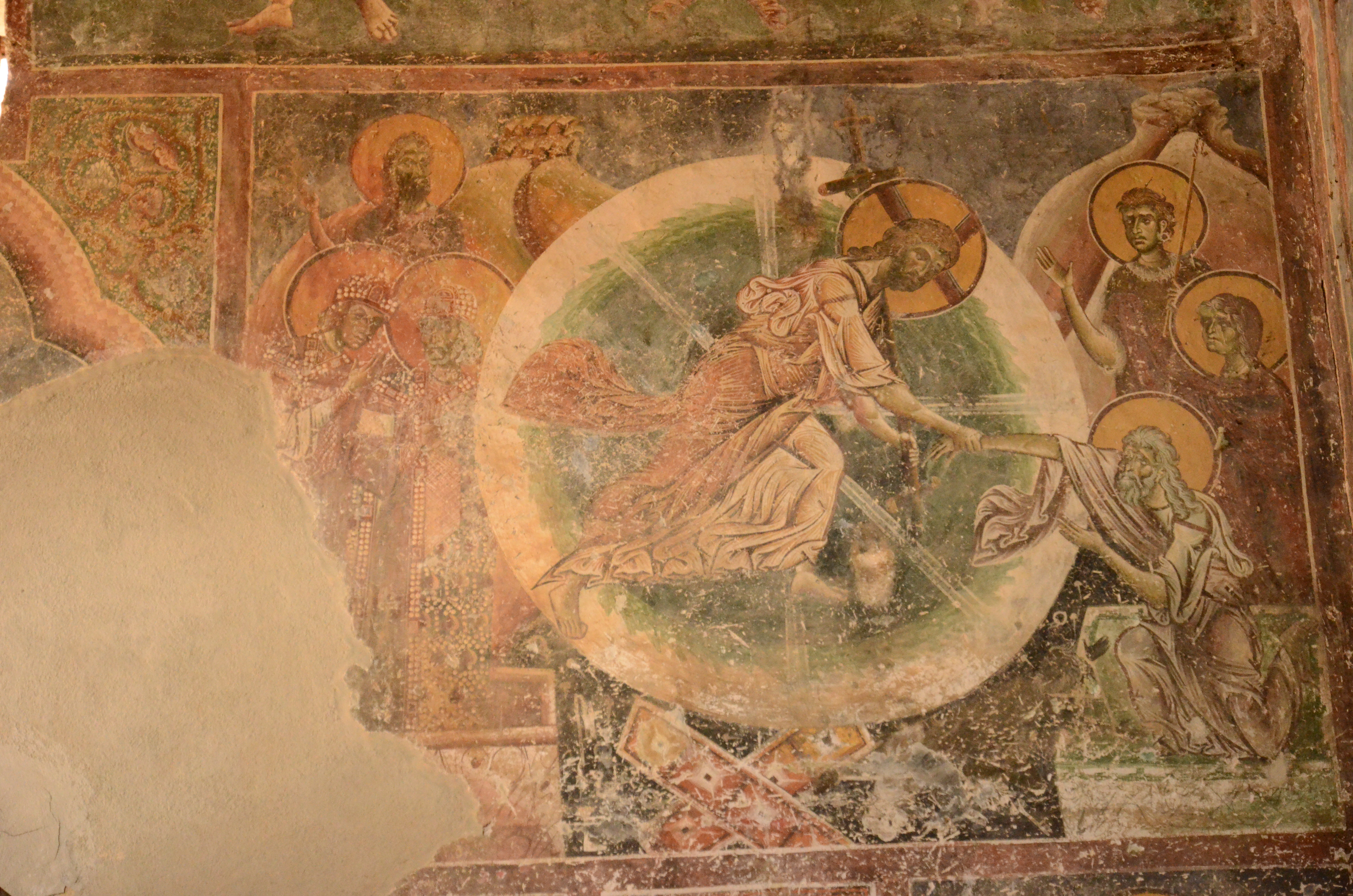
Harrowing of Hell, northern wall.

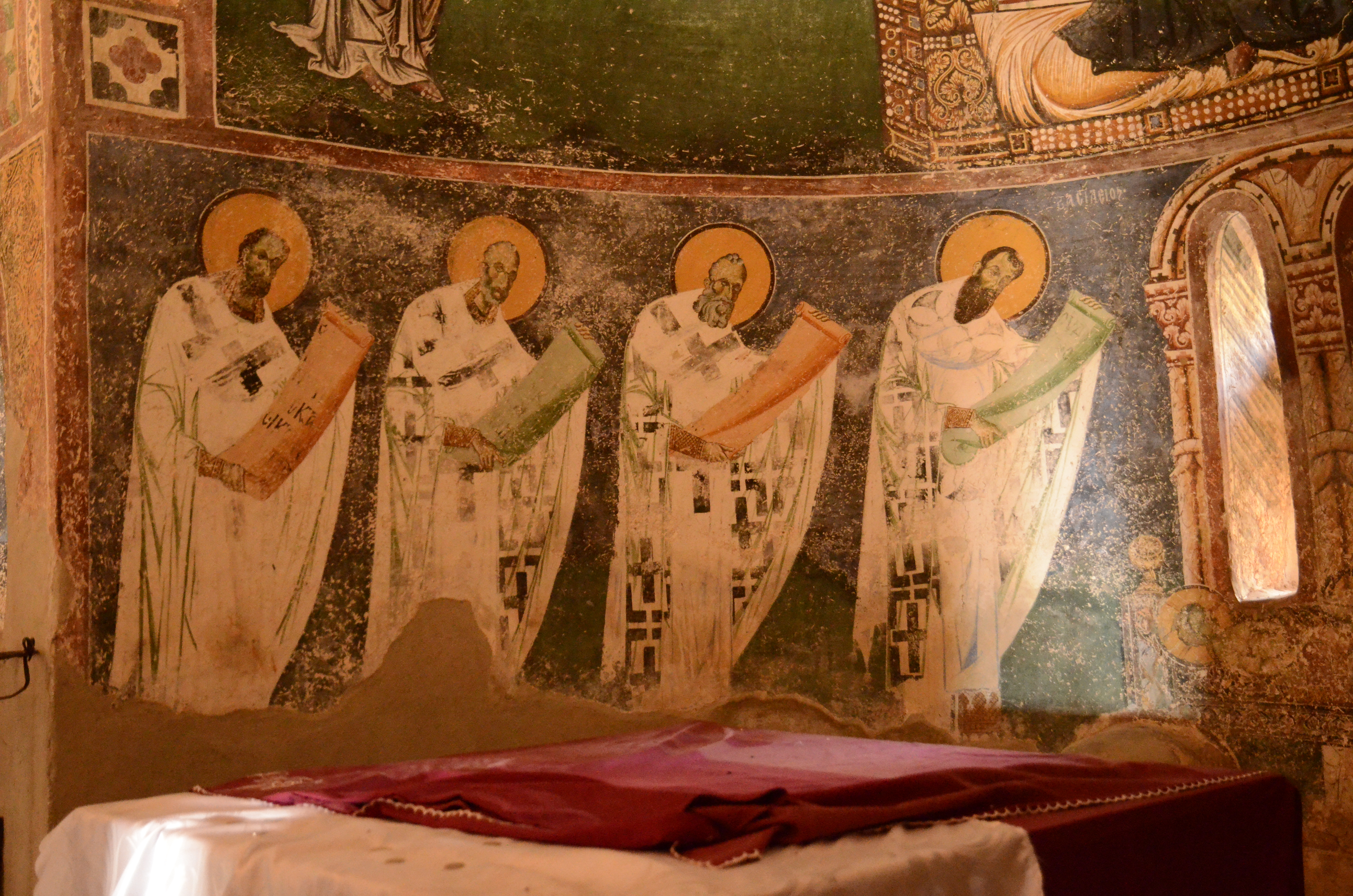
Church Fathers in the left side of the apse.

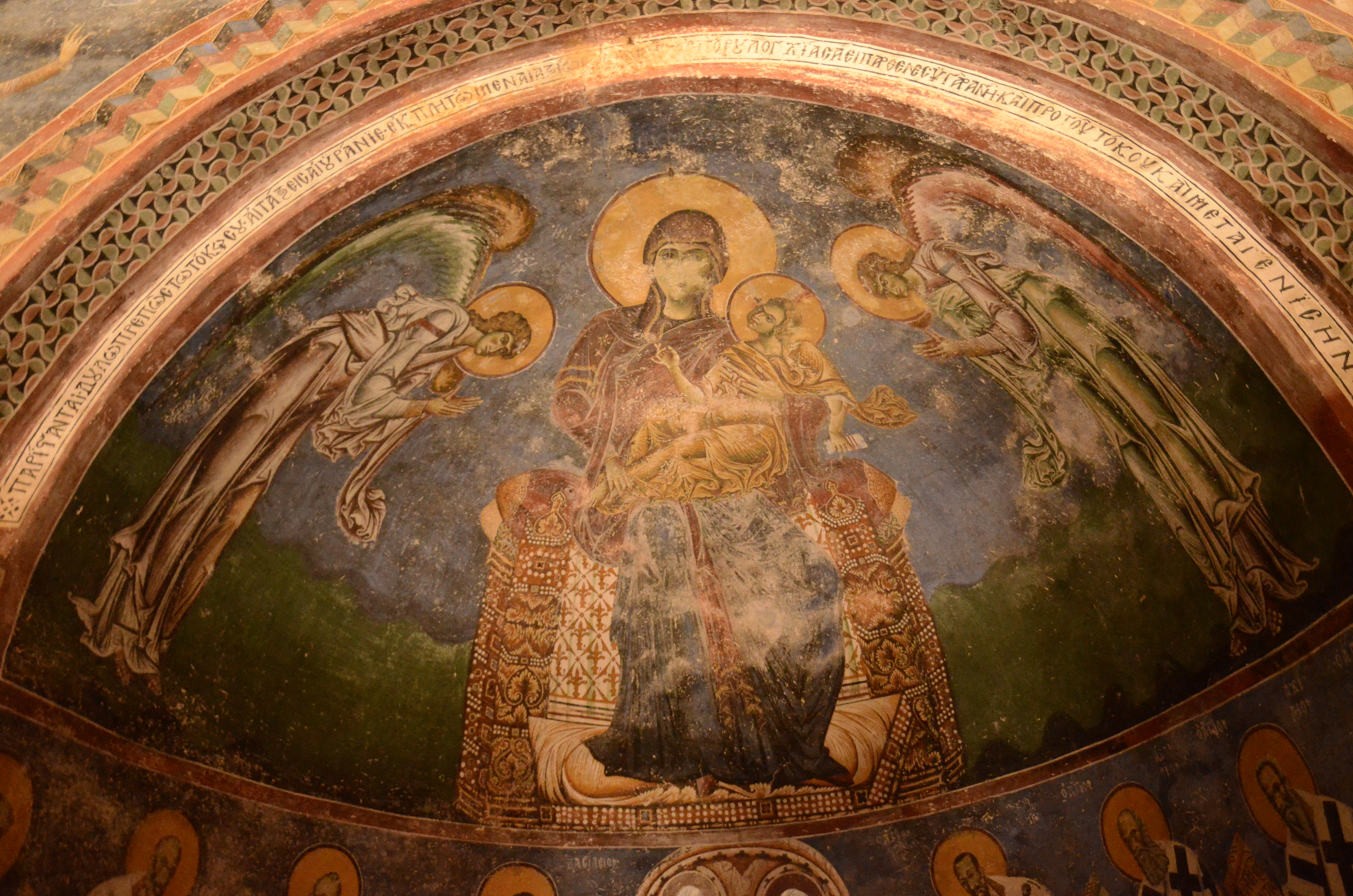
Mary with Christ in the apse.

== Literature ==
- Elizabeta Dimitrova: The Church of St. George at Kurbinovo. In: Seven mediaeval churches in the republic of Macedonia. Skopje 2014, S. 46–62.
- Vojislav Durić: Byzantinische Fresken in Jugoslawien. München 1976, S. 17–19.
- Lydie Hadermann-Misguich: Kurbinovo. Les fresques de Saint-Georges et la peinture byzantine du XIIe siècle. Bruxelles 1975, S. 11–21.
- Sašo Korunovski, Elizabeta Dimitrova: Macédoine Byzantine. Histoire de l'art macédonien du IXe au XIVe siècle. Paris 2006, S. 50–52. 73–80.
- Aneta Serafimova: Mediaeval Painting in Macedonia (9th-18th Centuries). Skopje 2000, S. 42–46.
