= Odprava zelenega zmaja =

1976 novel by Slavko Pregl

- Author: Slavko Pregl
- Illustrator: Marjan Manček
- Language: Slovenian
- Genre: Young adult, adventure
- Publisher: Študentska založba
- Publication date: 1975
- Publication place: Slovenia
- ISBN: 9789612428631

Odprava zelenega zmaja is a novel by Slovenian author Slavko Pregl. It was first published in 1976.

== See also ==
- List of Slovenian novels
