= Alexander Behm =

German physicist

- Born: 11 November 1880
- Died: 22 January 1952 (aged 71)
- Occupation: Physicist

Alexander Behm (11 November 1880, in Sternberg (Mecklenburg) – 22 January 1952, in Tarp (Schleswig-Flensburg)) was a German physicist who developed working ocean echo sounder in Germany at the same time Reginald Fessenden was doing so in North America.

As head of a research laboratory in Vienna (Austria) he conducted experiments concerning the propagation of sound. He tried to develop an iceberg detection system using reflected sound waves after the Titanic disaster on 15 April 1912. In the end reflected sound waves proved not to be suitable for the detection of icebergs but for measuring the depth of the sea, because the bottom of the sea reflected them well. Thus, echo sounding was born.

Behm was granted German patent No. 282009 for the invention of echo sounding (device for measuring depths of the sea and distances and headings of ships or obstacles by means of reflected sound waves) on 22 July 1913.

In 1920 he founded the Behm Echo Sounding Company in Kiel in order to commercialise his invention. He was also a fanatic angler and an inventor of fishing tackle, like Behm-Fliege and Behm-Blinker.

== See also ==
- German inventors and discoverers
