= Slovenian Book Agency =

The Slovenian Book Agency (Slovene: Javna agencija za knjigo Republike Slovenije often abbreviated to JAK or JAKRS) is an autonomous government agency in Slovenia that was created to promote the importance of books and reading in Slovenia and beyond.

The Agency was created in 2008 and began to function on 1 January 2009, fulfilling the provisions of a presidential decree signed in December 2007. Its main aims are to provide the necessary conditions for top quality creativity in the field of literature and scientific publications, for greater accessibility to Slovene books, for raising the awareness of the importance of books and reading in the development of the individual and society and for increasing the international presence of authors of literary and scientific publications from Slovenia. The agency provides funds for a variety of literary projects and authors, promotes Slovene literature and the publication of quality literary and scientific works. It also promotes Slovene literature internationally through encouraging cooperation, assisting with representation at international book fairs and funding translations for publications abroad.

From 2009 to 2012 its director was Slavko Pregl.
