= RV Denar 2 =

Turkish research and survey vessel

History

Turkey
- Name: Denar 2 (2013); (Italy) ex Mare Oceano (1988); (Panama) ex Sofie Bravo (1979); (Denmark) ex Leila Bech (1974)
- Owner: 2E Maritime, Istanbul, Turkey
- Builder: Sønderborg Skibsværft A/S, Sønderborg, Denmark
- Launched: January 12, 1974
- Commissioned: May 1, 1974
- Homeport: Istanbul, Turkey
- Identification: IMO number: 7347067; MMSI number: 271043701
- Status: Active

General characteristics
- Class & type: 100-A-1.1-Nav IL; Ap; ST
- Tonnage: 2,033 GT; 2,997 DWT; 610 NT
- Length: 78.80 m (258 ft 6 in)
- Beam: 13.25 m (43 ft 6 in)
- Draft: 4.16 m (13 ft 8 in)
- Depth: 6.00 m (19 ft 8 in)
- Installed power: 1,589 kW (2,131 hp)
- Propulsion: Alpha B&W 16V23HU - 4S 16cyl-Vee 225 x 300 Trp 750 rpm
- Speed: 10 knots (19 km/h) (service); 11 knots (20 km/h) (max.)
- Armament: None

The RV Denar 2 is a Turkish research and survey vessel owned by TOMA Maritime S.A. Istanbul, Turkey and operated 2E Maritime in Istanbul, Turkey.

She was built by Sønderborg Skibsværft A/S in Sønderborg, Denmark. Christened Leila Bech, she was launched on January 12, 1974, and was commissioned under the Danish flag on May 1, 1974. After sailing under the Panamas and Ilaian flags, she was finally purchased by the Turkish private maritime company in October 2013 as the first and so far the only non-governmental vessel of her kind. She was renamed "Denar", short for "Deniz Araştırmaları" (literally: sea surveys).

She made her first operation in the Mediterranean Sea for the Northern Cyprus Water Supply Project, an international water diversion project designed to supply water for drinking and irrigation from southern Turkey to Northern Cyprus via undersea pipeline. With the help of her two remotely operated underwater vehicles (ROV), she was put into service at the construction projects of Marmaray, İzmit Bay Bridge and Yavuz Sultan Selim Bridge in addition to deep sea surveys.

== Characteristics ==
=== Vessel ===
Denar 2 is 78.80 m (258 ft 6 in) long, with a beam of 13.25 m (43 ft 6 in) and a max. draft of 4.16 m (13 ft 8 in). Assessed at 2,033 GT, 2,997 DWT and 610 NT, the ship is propelled by a 1,589 kW (2,131 hp) diesel engine of type Alpha Burmeister & Wain 16V23HU - 4S 16cyl-Vee 225 x 300 Trp 750 rpm. She has a top speed of 11 knots (20 km/h) with 10 knots (19 km/h) in service.

She has capabilities for bathymetric surveys, oceanographic surveys, geological surveys, geophysical surveys and geotechnical engineering. Furthermore, she can be used in coastal management and ocean engineering applications such as submarine pipeline applications and for dredging services.

She has three cranes capable of lifting loads between 3.5–10 tonnes, and an A-frame for 20 tonnes. She is equipped with following instrumentation:

She carries two ROVs:

Work-class ROV (TRV-HD) capable of diving up to 1,000 m (3,300 ft) and carrying payloads up to 136 kg (300 lb):

- Dimensions: 170 cm × 138 cm × 91 cm (67 in × 54 in × 36 in)
- Weight: 795 kg (1,753 lb),
- Sonar: MS 1000 Sonar Head
- Underwater cameras (4): HD Sony Zoom Camera, low-light camera, 360° rotating camera and color manipulator camera.

Image-class ROV (Saab Seaeye Falcon) with diving capability of up to 300 m (980 ft):

- Dimensions: 100 cm × 60 cm × 50 cm (39 in × 24 in × 20 in)
- Weight: 60 kg (130 lb),
- Sonar: MS 1000 Sonar & Imaginex Sonar
- Underwater cameras (2): 480 TVL Color Camera and low-light camera.

She features the following equipment:

Multibeam echosounder (Kongsberg EM 1002)

- Sub-bottom profiler (Kongsberg TOPAS PS 40),
- Sparker (Geo Resources),
- Boomer (Applied Acoustics),
- Side-scan sonar (Klein System 3000)

=== Instruments ===
She has following capabilities:

Positioning system: (Kongsberg-Simrad SDP 11),

- Applanix POS MV Wave Master Motion Sensor
- Trimble R5700 CORS GPS
- Trimble SPS-550 DGPS
- Fugro MarineStar RTK GPS
- Hi-Target V9 GPS
- Applied Acoustics Engineering EasyTrak USBL
- FOIF OTS685L Total Station

Hydrographic survey systems:

- R2Sonic Sonic 2024 Multibeam echosounder,
- Valeport MIDAS On-Line SVS,
- Atlas DESO-30 Single-Beam Echosounder,
- Hi-Target HD-370 Single-Beam Echosounder,
- Knudsen 320M Single-Beam Echosounder.

Oceanographic/meteorological survey systems:

- RD Instruments 300 kHz ADCP,
- RD Instruments 600 kHz ADCP,
- Flowquest 1000 kHz Current Meter,
- AANDERAA RDCP 600 kHz,
- RBR XR-620 CTD,
- RBR TGR-1050 HT Tide Gauge,
- HyroBios Niskin Type Water Sampler,
- DAVIS Vantage Pro2 Plus Automatic Meteorological Station.

Geophysical survey systems:

- C-MAX CM2 Sidescan Sonar,
- Tritech Seaking Sidescan Sonar,
- Tritech Starfish Sidescan Sonar,
- Applied Acoustics Engineering CSP-D/Boomer Shallow Seismic System,
- Knudsen Engineering 3212 Sub-Bottom Profiler,
- Stratabox 3510 Sub-Bottom Profiler,
- Tritech Seaking Parametric Sub-Bottom Profiler.

Geological survey and geotechnical systems:

- Orange Peel Type Sediment Sampler,
- HydroBios Box Type Sediment Sampler,
- Piston Corer.

Software:

- Fledermaus Pro,
- HypackMax,
- Trimble HydroPro.

== Ship's register ==
- January 12, 1974 ex Leila Bech, built by Sønderborg Skibsværft A/S, Sønderborg, and sailed under Danish flag,
- September 9, 1979 ex Sofie Bravo under the flag of Panama,
- December 15, 1998 ex Mare Oceano under Italian flag,
- October 2013 Denar 2 under Turkish flag.

== See also ==
- List of research vessels of Turkey
