= Dananir (qayna of Ibn Kunasa) =

Arab female poet of Abbasid period

Dananir دنانير
- Born: 8th or 9th century Kufa, Abbasid Caliphate (present-day Iraq)
- Died: c. 823 (before 823 or 824)
- Occupations: Arabic poet, singer, and storyteller
- Writing career
- Language: Arabic
- Period: Islamic Golden Age (Abbasid era)

Dananir (8th or 9th century – died c. 823 or earlier) was a musician and poet from Kufa in the Abbasid Caliphate. A non-free qayna, she was owned by muhaddith, poet and philologist Abu Yahya Muhammad ibn Kunasa (b. 741 – d. 823 or 824). Well-known in her time, but otherwise only known by her given name, she is descriptively referred to as Dananir jariyat Muhammad ibn Kunnasa (Arabic: دنانيرُ جاريةُ محمدِ بنِ كنّاسةَ; lit. 'Dananir, slave-girl of Muhammad ibn Kunnasa').

Dananir was a muwallada, a child born to parents of disparate backgrounds. Ibn Kunasa, described as a scholarly man, raised her and trained her as a singer and poet. She is described as a poet proficient in Classical Arabic, musically educated, and a gifted storyteller. She created her performances herself and recited for the literary elite. Ibn Kunasa reportedly refused offers of thousands of dirhams or dinars to sell her. She died before his death in 823 or 824.

Dananir is mentioned in classical Arabic literature, notably by Abu al-Faraj al-Isfahani, who quotes two of her songs and praises her poetry as superior to that of Buhturi. She also appears in Ibn Fadlallah al-Umari's work Masālik al-abṣār, an encyclopaedia-like compendium.

== See also ==
- Dananir al-Barmakiyya, another early-Abbasid-era qayna (better known)
