= Macedonian denar =

Currency of North Macedonia

македонски денар (Macedonian)

ISO 4217
- Code: MKD (numeric: 807)
- Subunit: 0.01

Units of account
- Plural: denari (Macedonian: денари, lit. 'denars')
- Symbol: den (Macedonian: ден)
- Subunit
- 1/100: deni (Macedonian: дени; no longer used, still redeemable at the National Bank of North Macedonia)

Denominations
- Banknotes
- Freq. used: 10 MKD, 50 MKD, 100 MKD, 200 MKD, 500 MKD, 1,000 MKD, 2,000 MKD
- Coins
- Freq. used: 1 MKD, 2 MKD, 5 MKD, 10 MKD, 50 MKD

Demographics
- Replaced: Yugoslav dinar
- User(s): North Macedonia

Issuance
- Central bank: National Bank of the Republic of North Macedonia
- Website: www.nbrm.mk

Valuation
- Inflation: 4.5% (CPI)
- Source: stat.mk, June 2025

The denar (Macedonian: денар; plural: denari / денари; abbreviation: den / ден; ISO code: MKD) is the currency of North Macedonia. Though subdivided into one hundred deni (дени), coins with a denomination of less than one denar have not been in use since 2013.

== History ==
The first denar was established as a temporary currency on 26 April 1992 in the then-Republic of Macedonia, replacing the 1990 version of the Yugoslav dinar at a 1:1 parity. In May 1993, the currency was reformed and a new denar was introduced, with one new denar being equal to 100 old denars.

=== Etymology ===
The name denar comes from the name of the ancient Roman monetary unit, the denarius. The abbreviation is ден, the first three Cyrillic letters of its name.

== First denar (1992–1993) ==
The first denar was a temporary currency introduced on 26 April 1992 to replace the Yugoslav dinar at 1:1 parity and establish the monetary independence of Macedonia.

=== History ===
Macedonia declared independence from Yugoslavia on 8 September 1991. At the time, the country was using the Yugoslav dinar. But secret preparations were begun to introduce its own currency, and by April 1992, Macedonia was ready to acquire monetary independence from Yugoslavia. On 26 April, the National Bank of Macedonia was established and the denar declared the national currency. Notes in the form of "value coupons" entered circulation the following day, and on 30 April 1992, the Yugoslav dinar ceased to be legal tender. In May 1993, the first denar was replaced at a rate of 100 to 1 by a new, permanent denar consisting of notes and coins.

=== Coins ===
No coins were issued for the first denar.

=== Banknotes ===
Temporary notes ("value coupons") were introduced on 27 April 1992, although preparations for producing them began much earlier. The notes remained in circulation until they were replaced by permanent notes of the second denar in 1993.

==== Production ====
Printing of the notes started on 15 January 1992 at the “11 October” printing firm in Prilep. The difficulties of creating a new currency in secret were reflected in the notes themselves. The paper, purchased from Slovenia, proved to be of poor quality and lacked adequate security. Although denominated in denari, the name of the currency did not appear on the notes because they were printed prior to the adoption of the Law on the Monetary Unit. Likewise, the issuer appeared as the "National Bank of Macedonia", not its successor, the National Bank of the Republic of Macedonia.

==== Design ====
The notes were designed by a young employee of the "11 October" printer, who had only one week and a limited budget to design them. Thus the six lowest denominations were identical, with the exception of their colours. All featured a man and two women picking tobacco leaves on the front, with the back devoted to the Ilinden monument in Kruševo, which, according to the bank, “expresses the eternal fight of citizens of Macedonia for life in peace and freedom.”

Banknotes of the first denar
Image		Value	Dimensions	Watermark	Description		Date of			
Obverse	Reverse	Value	Dimensions	Watermark	Obverse	Reverse	printing	issue	withdrawal	lapse
		10 DEN	143mm × ? mm	Design	Women gathering tobacco	Monument Makedonium in Kruševo	1992	27 April 1992	10 May 1993	?
		25 DEN	143mm × ? mm	Design	Women gathering tobacco	Monument Makedonium in Kruševo	1992	27 April 1992	10 May 1993	?
		50 DEN*	143mm × ? mm	Design	Women gathering tobacco	Monument Makedonium in Kruševo	1992	27 April 1992	31 August 1993	?
		100 DEN	143mm × ? mm	Design	Women gathering tobacco	Monument Makedonium in Kruševo	1992	27 April 1992	31 August 1993	?
		500 DEN	143mm × ? mm	Design	Women gathering tobacco	Monument Makedonium in Kruševo	1992	27 April 1992	31 August 1993	?
		1,000 DEN	143mm × ? mm	Design	Women gathering tobacco	Monument Makedonium in Kruševo	1992	27 April 1992	30 November 1993	?
		5,000 DEN	143mm × ? mm	Design	Monument Makedonium in Kruševo	Girl in front of a computer	1992	27 April 1992	30 November 1993	?
		10,000 DEN	143mm × ? mm	Design	Panorama of the Church of St. Sofia, Ohrid	Men dancing and the monument Makedonium in Kruševo	1992	27 April 1992	30 November 1993	?
These images are to scale at 0.7 pixel per millimetre (18 pixel per inch). For table standards, see the banknote specification table.: After 10 May 1993 these banknotes remained in circulation at 1/100 of their nominal value.

=== Exchange rates ===
The denar was introduced with a fixed exchange rate of 360 denars to the Deutsche Mark. There was a devaluation in October 1992 and change to the basket peg, new devaluation in December 1992 and abandonment of the peg in mid-1993.

== Second denar (1993–present) ==
=== Coins ===
==== First series (1993) ====
In May 1993, coins for the second denar were introduced in denominations of 50 deni, and 1, 2, and 5 denars. The coins were designed by Dimče Boškoski and Snežana Atanasovska. In November 2008, 10 and 50 denar coins were introduced, while the 50 deni coin was withdrawn in 2013. Due to its low mintage, it had only been struck in 1993 and was practically never seen in circulation.

Since 1996, a large number of commemorative coins have been issued for collectors; a listing can be found on the national bank website.

Coins are minted at the Suvenir factory in Samokov, a village near Makedonski Brod.

Coins of the denar (1993–present)
Image	Value	Technical parameters			Description			Date of			
Image	Value	Diameter	Mass	Composition	Edge	Obverse	Reverse	minting	issue	withdrawal	lapse
	50 deni	21.5 mm	4.1 g	CuZn15	Plain	Value, Stylized horizont with a 16-ray sun	РЕПУБЛИКА МАКЕДОНИЈА, circular; year in the lower central field. Flying seagull	1993	10 May 1993	1 January 2013	Indefinitely*
	1 DEN	23.80 mm	5.1 g	Cu80Ni3Zn17	Plain	Value, Stylized horizont with a 16-ray sun	РЕПУБЛИКА МАКЕДОНИЈА, circular; year in the lower central field. Šarplaninec shepherd dog	1993; 1997; 2001; 2006; 2008; 2014 2016	10 May 1993	Current	
	2 DEN	25.50 mm	6.2 g	Cu80Ni3Zn17	Plain	Value, Stylized horizont with a 16-ray sun	РЕПУБЛИКА МАКЕДОНИЈА, circular; year in the lower central field. Ohrid trout (Salmo letnica).	1993; 2001; 2006; 2008 2014 2018	10 May 1993	Current	
	5 DEN	27.5 mm	7.2 g	Cu80Ni3Zn17	Plain	Value, Stylized horizont with a 16-ray sun	РЕПУБЛИКА МАКЕДОНИЈА, circular; year in the lower central field. Balkan lynx (Lynx lynx balcanicus).	1993; 2001; 2006; 2008 2014	10 May 1993	Current	
	10 DEN	24.5 mm	6.6 g	Cu70Ni12Zn18	Plain	Value, Stylized horizont with a 16-ray sun	Peacock, floor mosaic from Stobi from the 6th century AD, detail presented on the banknote of 10 Denari	2008 2017	15 November 2008	Current	
	50 DEN	26.5 mm	7.7 g	Cu62Ni18Zn20	Plain	Value, Stylized horizont with a 16-ray sun	Archangel Gabriel, fresco from the Church of St. George, Kurbinovo - 12th century, detail presented on the banknote of 50 Denari	2008	15 November 2008	Current	
These images are to scale at 2.5 pixels per millimetre. For table standards, see the coin specification table.: Until 1 April 2013, coins of 50 deni could be exchanged at any domestic bank. Although no deadline has been set, after that date, the coins can be exchanged only at the National Bank of North Macedonia.

==== Second series (2020) ====
Due to the country's name change as part of the Prespa Agreement, a new set of coins featuring the new name of North Macedonia is being released into circulation, starting with 1 denar coins in April 2021.

Coins of the second series (2020–present)
Image	Value	Technical parameters			Description			Date of			
Image	Value	Diameter	Mass	Composition	Edge	Obverse	Reverse	minting	issue	withdrawal	lapse
	1 DEN	23.80 mm	5.1 g	Steel core coated with copper and brass	Plain	Value, Stylized horizont with a 16-ray sun	Република Северна Македонија, circular; year in the lower central field. Šarplaninec shepherd dog	2020 2024	1 April 2021	Current	
	2 DEN	25.50 mm	6.2 g	Steel core coated with copper and brass	Plain	Value, Stylized horizont with a 16-ray sun	Република Северна Македонија, circular; year in the lower central field. Ohrid trout (Salmo letnica).	2022 2024		Current	
	5 DEN	27.5 mm	7.2 g	Steel core coated with copper and brass	Plain	Value, Stylized horizont with a 16-ray sun	Република Северна Македонија, circular; year in the lower central field. Balkan lynx (Lynx lynx balcanicus).	2022 2024		Current	
These images are to scale at 2.5 pixels per millimetre. For table standards, see the coin specification table.

==== FAO coinage (1995) ====
In 1995, circulation coins of 1, 2, and 5 denar denominations were struck in honor of the United Nations' Food and Agriculture Organization.

=== Banknotes ===
In 1993, the new denar was issued in denominations of 10, 20, 50, 100, and 500 denar notes. The 20 denar note was only issued in this first series. In 1996, 1000 and 5000 denar notes were added. In 2016, notes of 200 and 2,000 denars were issued, while the national bank began withdrawing the 5000 denar banknote from circulation to re-balance the structure of notes in circulation. In 2017, the national bank unveiled its current polymer banknotes, the 10 and 50 denar notes, and put them into circulation on May 15.

Obverse	Reverse	Value	Colour	Obverse	Reverse
1993 series (Issued October 1993)
		10 DEN	blue	Makedonium Monument in Kruševo	Panorama of Kruševo
		20 DEN	brown-dark red	Daut-Pasha Bath in Skopje	Clock tower in Skopje
		50 DEN	red	Monastery of St. Pantelejmon in Skopje	Old National Bank of Macedonia building in Skopje
		100 DEN	brown	Church of St. Sofia in Ohrid	National Museum building in Ohrid
		500 DEN	brown-dark green	Monastery of St. Jovan Caneo in Ohrid	Samuil's Fortress in Ohrid
1996 series
		10 DEN	lilac	Egyptian goddess Isis (Izida, 2nd century BC), Ohrid; gold earring (4th century BC), v. Beranci, Bitola	Mosaic in Stobi (4th-5th century)
		50 DEN	blue	Fresco in the Church of St. Pantelejmon, Nerezi; Follis coin	Arhangel Gavril in the St. Ǵorǵi Church, Kurbinovo
		100 DEN	lilac-brown	Skopje from engraving by Jacobus Harevin	View of Skopje from an Albanian house
		500 DEN	red-brown	Gold mask, v. Trebeništa, Ohrid (6th century BC)	Poppy flower
		1,000 DEN	brown	Madonna Episkepis, icon from the Church of St. Vrači, Ohrid, 14th century	Gregory's gallery (14th century), Church of St. Sofia, Ohrid
		5,000 DEN	red-brown-green	Bronze figure of Maenad (6th century BC), Tetovo	Dog and tree, mosaic, Heraclea Lyncestis (5th-6th century AD), Bitola
Upgrade of the 1996 series
		500 DEN	red-brown	Gold mask, v. Trebeništa, Ohrid (6th century BC)	Poppy flower
		1,000 DEN	brown	Madonna Episkepis, icon from the St. Vrači Church, Ohrid, 14th century	Gregory's gallery (14th century), Church of St. Sofia, Ohrid
2014 series (Issued December 2016)
		200 DEN		Early medieval bronze fibula (found near Prilep); Relief of the Old Testament Psalm 41 (terracotta icon from Vinica)	Artistic elements on the façade of Colorful Mosque (Šarena Džamija, Alaca Cami), Tetovo; Marble tiles with floral designs of Isaak Beg Mosque (Isak Džamija), Bitola
		2000 DEN		Bronze artefact in the form of cup poppy (discovered in Suva Reka, Gevgelija); Macedonian bridal dress from Prilep	Decoration on the inside of a gilded bowl (16th century), "Source of Life", peacocks
2018 "Polymer Series" (Issued March 2018)
		10 DEN	lilac	Egyptian goddess Isis (Izida, 2nd century BC), Ohrid; gold earring (4th century BC), v. Beranci, Bitola. Mosaic in Stobi (4th–5th century)	Mosaic in Stobi (4th–5th century)
		50 DEN	blue	Fresco in the Church of St. Pantelejmon, Nerezi; Follis coin	Arhangel Gavril in the St. Ǵorǵi Church, Kurbinovo

=== Exchange rates ===
Since October 1995, the nominal exchange rate of the Denar was pegged against the Deutsche Mark. Since January 2002, it is pegged against the euro.

The denar is de facto pegged to the euro using a stabilized agreement at a rate of 1 EUR=61.3644 MKD±1%.

Current MKD exchange rates
From Google Finance:	AUD CAD CHF CNY EUR GBP HKD JPY USD TRY
From Yahoo! Finance:	AUD CAD CHF CNY EUR GBP HKD JPY USD TRY
From XE.com:	AUD CAD CHF CNY EUR GBP HKD JPY USD TRY
From OANDA:	AUD CAD CHF CNY EUR GBP HKD JPY USD TRY

== See also ==
- Economy of North Macedonia
- Denarius
- Serbian dinar
