= Dinar (disambiguation) =

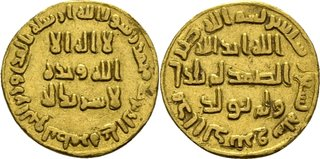
Umayyad Caliphate Gold Dinar.

Dinar may refer to:

- Dinar, currency, or name used by multiple currencies, or a type of (gold or silver) coin
- Dinar Líneas Aéreas, Argentinian airlines
- Dinar, Afyonkarahisar, a town in Afyonkarahisar Province, Turkey
- Dinar District, Afyonkarahisar Province, Turkey
- The MIC Dinar is a Sudanese, license-produced variant of the HK G3 rifle.
- Kani Dinar, Iran
- Dinar of Hereti

== See also ==
- Denar (disambiguation)
