= Slavko Pregl =

Slovene writer, editor and publisher (1945–2026)

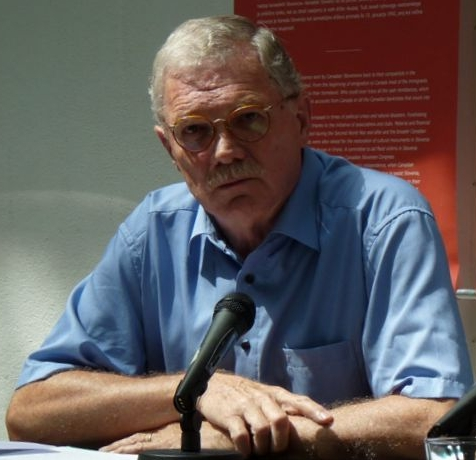
- Pregl in 2012
- Born: 9 September 1945; Šentvid (Ljubljana), Federal Slovenia, DF Yugoslavia (now Slovenia)
- Died: 10 August 2026 (aged 80); Slovenia
- Occupations: Writer, publisher, editor
- Writing career
- Notable works: Basni, Geniji v kratkih hlačah, Srebro iz modre špilje, Usodni telefon

Vekoslav "Slavko" Pregl (9 September 1945 – 10 August 2026) was a Slovene writer, editor and publisher best known for his youth literature. He was a director of the Slovenian Book Agency.

== Life and career ==
Pregl was born in Šentvid (Ljubljana) on 9 September 1945. He studied at the Faculty of Economics of the University of Ljubljana and obtained his degree in 1972. From 1969 to 1991 he worked at the Mladinska knjiga publishing house and then for a while headed his own publishing company EWO. He served as president of the Slovene Writers' Association from 2007 to 2009 and was made the director of the newly created, government funded, Slovenian Book Agency in 2009 and headed the agency until his retirement in August 2012.

Pregl died on 10 August 2026, at the age of 80.

== Published works ==
- Nova zgodovina (A New History, 1972)
- Odprava zelenega zmaja (The Expedition of the Green Dragon, 1976)
- Priročnik za klatenje (A Handbook for Vagrancy, 1977)
- Basni (Fables, 1978)
- Geniji v kratkih hlačah (Geniuses in Short Pants, 1978)
- Papiga v šoli (Parrot Goes to School, 1978)
- Denar (Money, 1979)
- Umazana zgodba (A Dirty Story, 1981)
- Juha Cviluha (Whiner's Soup, 1981)
- Strašna bratranca (The Terrible Cousins, 1981)
- Zgode na dvoru kralja Janeza (Some Events at the Court of King John, 1981)
- Zdravilo za poredneže (The Cure for Naughtyheads, 1982)
- Bojni zapiski mestnega mulca (A City Kid's War Notebook, 1982)
- Smejalnik in cvililna zavora (Smiler and the Squeaky Brake, 1984)
- Geniji v dolgih hlačah (Geniuses in Long Pants, 1985)
- Zgodba o knjigi (Tale of the Book, 1986)
- Zgodovina o knjigi za (History of the Book for, 1986)
- Smrka in njegovi (Snot and His Crew, 1987)
- Umazana zgodba (A Dirty Story, 1988)
- Olimpiada v živalskem vrtu (The Zoo Olympics, 1990)
- Če bi ali če ne bi (If It Was Or If It Wasn't, 1993)
- Počesane muhe (Combed Flies, 1993)
- Papiga že spet v šoli (Parrot Goes To School Again Already, 2001)
- S knjigo po svetu (With a Book Around the World, 2003)
- Srebro iz modre špilje (Silver from the Blue Cavern, 2003)
- Zvezda s čepico (Star With a Hat, 2003)
- Male oblačne zgodbe (Little Cloudy Stories, 2004)
- Zadnja želja (The Last Wish, 2004)
- Usodni telefon (The Fatal Telephone, 2004)
- Spričevalo (The Report Card, 2005)
- Ujeti ribič (The Hooked Fisherman, 2005)
- Dva majhna velika ribiča (Two Little Big Fishermen, 2006)
- Med delom in denarjem (Between Work and Money, 2008)
- Petelin na gnoju:basni (The Rooster on the Dungheap: Fables, 2008)
- Car brez zaklada (The Treasureless Emperor, 2009)
- Geniji brez hlač (Geniuses Without Pants, 2009)
- Lutke iz sedmega nadstropja (Puppets from the Seventh Floor, 2009)
- Sladke denarnice in druge basni (Sweet Wallets and Other Fables, 2009)
- Čudni časi : basni (Strange Times: Fables, 2011)
