= Uncertainty budget =

The uncertainty budget is an aid for specifying measurement uncertainty. Individual measurement uncertainty factors are summarised, usually in tabular form, to form the measurement uncertainty budget.

Following the description of the measurement procedure and the model equation, the knowledge of all input variables (values, distribution function, standard uncertainties) can be illustrated in the uncertainty budget. From this, it is possible to determine the result value and its standard uncertainty–the expansion factor and the specification of the expanded measurement uncertainty. For a series of measurements (continually sampled measurement sequences), two cases must be distinguished: constant measurement uncertainty and changeable measurement.

== Constant measurement ==
Constant measurement uncertainty is independent of time. It can be determined once and remains constant. With a constant measurement-uncertainty budget, complete data records can be obtained. The measurement uncertainty applies to every measurement point. If the measurement uncertainty is constant, this simplifies further processing.

=== Example ===
A thermocouple and a measuring device can be used to determine the temperature of the oil in an oil sump. The measurement uncertainty of the measuring amplifier and the thermocouple do not change. Both are read from their respective data sheets and can be regarded as constant.

== Changeable measurement ==
A different measured value arises for the measurement uncertainty with each new measurement. The measurement uncertainty budget must be re-determined for each measured value.

=== Examples ===
A measured temperature value is read every day. Decisive influencing variables are ambient temperature and air pressure, which can vary every day.

The measurement uncertainty strongly depends on the size of the measured value itself, e.g., amplitude-proportional.

== See also ==
- Measurement uncertainty
- Uncertainty
- Accuracy and precision
- Confidence interval
