= Valeport Limited =

Manufacturer of instrumentation

Valeport Limited is a manufacturer of instrumentation for the hydrographic, hydrometric and oceanographic industries.

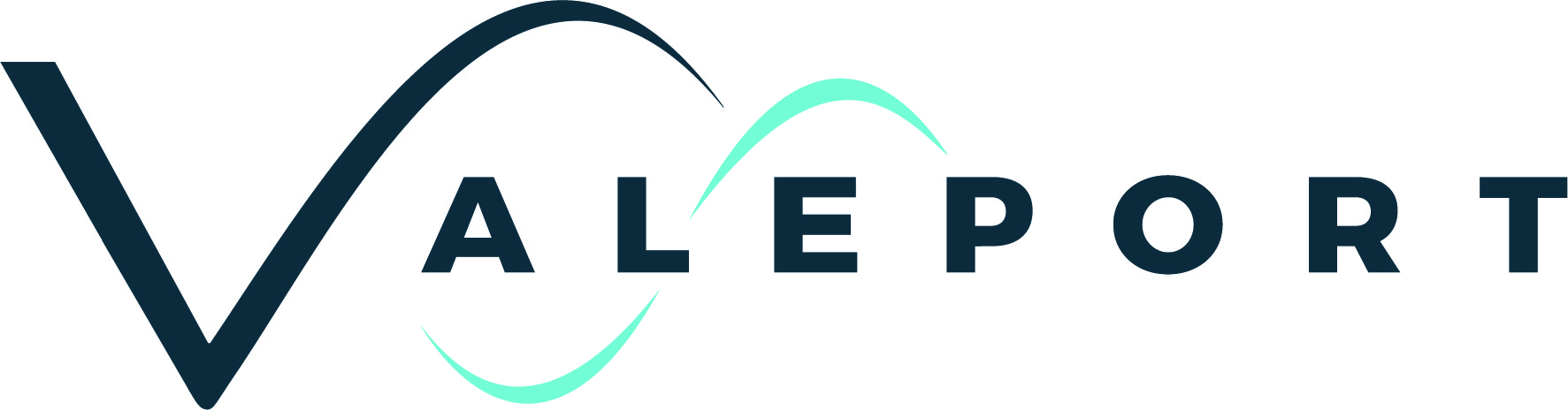
Valeport Logo

== History ==
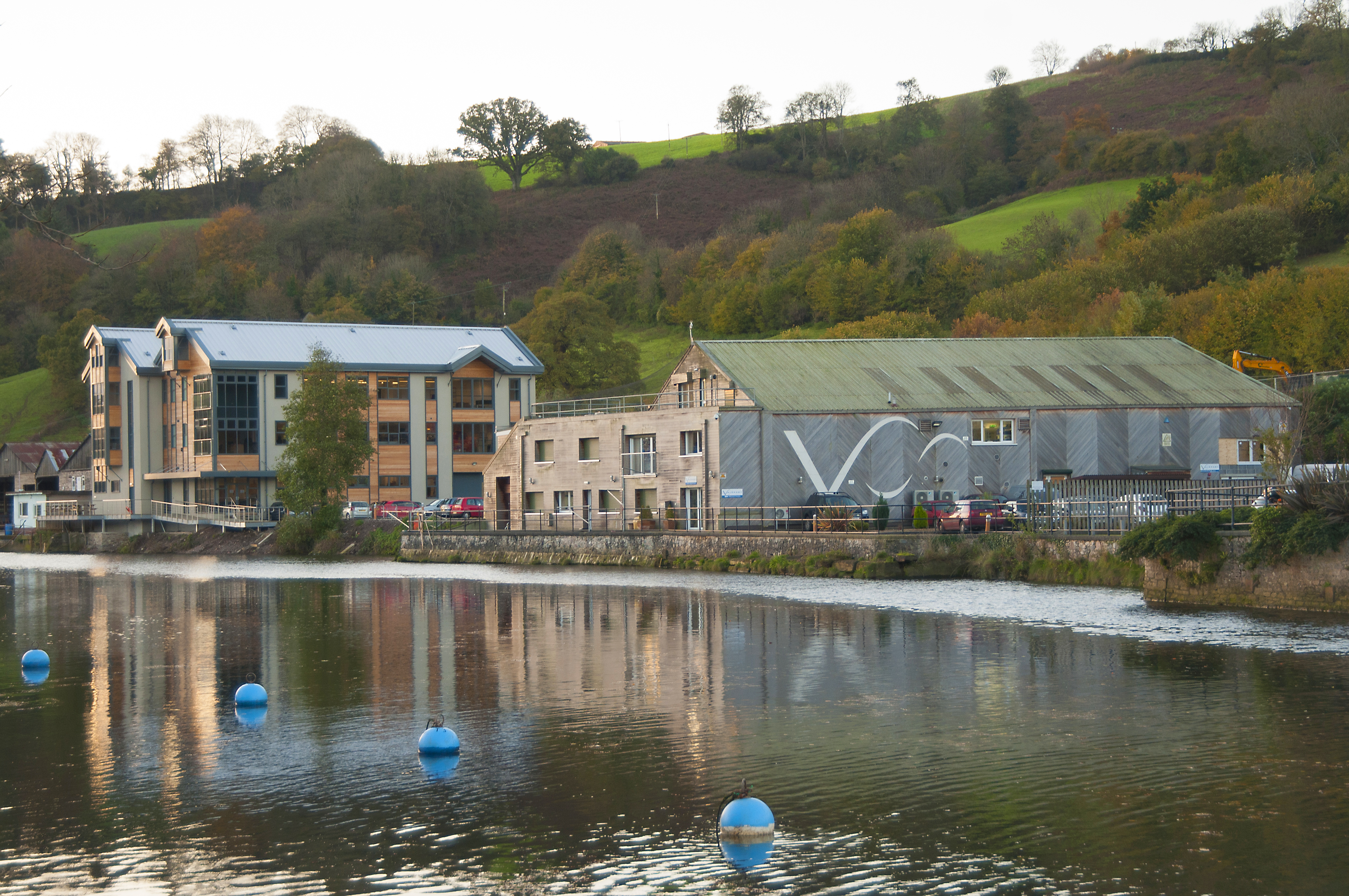
View of Valeport Limited from the River Dart 2014

Valeport was founded near Dartmouth, in Devon in 1969 by Jim Stevens and originally sold the Braystoke Flow Meter, an impeller-type device which was used in the feasibility study for the Thames Barrier. The popularity of this led to an expansion of the company into other types of flow meters and accessories. Valeport was then purchased in 1982 by Oceonics Group PLC before their flotation, which led to an expansion of Valeport's expertise to include CTD measurement. Oceonics sold Valeport in 1985 in a management buyout to the current chairman, Charles Quartley. The business remains solely owned by Charles Quartley and his immediate family.

Since 2005, Charles Quartley’s son Matthew took over the role of managing director from his father. In 2010, Matthew Quartley was awarded the annual Association of Marine Scientific Industries|Association of Marine Scientific Industries (AMSI) “Businessperson of the Year” award for being an “excellent example of the new generation of business people who are entering this dynamic industry and taking it to new heights”.

Valeport has greatly expanded since its founding in 1969: having outgrown its original site in Dartmouth, in 2003 the company moved to its current location on the banks of the River Dart at Totnes. From 2003 to 2012, Valeport’s annual turnover nearly quadrupled to £6.7m. This continued growth led to Valeport investing £2.5m in a new, 16,000 sq. ft. manufacturing building adjacent to the original building in Totnes in 2013.

== Customer base ==
Valeport's customer base includes business and individuals from the academic, environmental (including the monitoring of animal movements), military, oil and gas, renewable, construction, dredging and civil engineering sectors. Notable projects have included the installing of a tide gauge network for the Port of London Authority (PLA), and providing CTD sensor heads for the Sea Mammal Research Unit (SMRU), part of the University of St Andrews.

As of 2010, 72% of Valeport’s products are exported overseas annually, up from 60% in 2007.

== The Totnes Pound ==
In 2014, an image of Valeport’s technologies was included on the Totnes Pound’s £t21 note. Notable individuals pictured on the Totnes Pound notes currently include mathematician, philosopher and inventor Charles Babbage, musician Ben Howard, and author Mary Wesley.
