= Kurbinovo =

Kurbinovo Курбиново
- Village
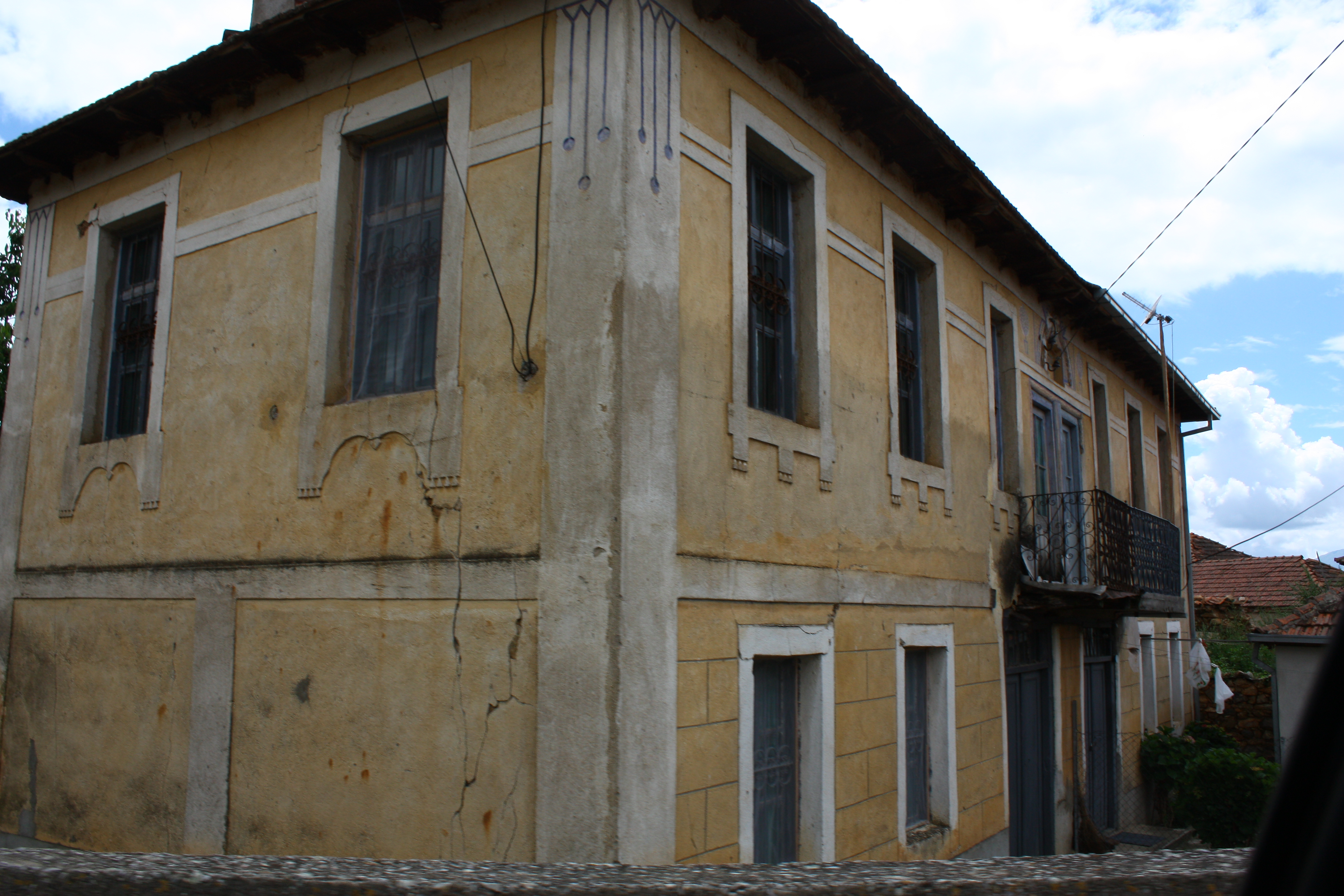
- Typical architecture in Kurbinovo

- Location within North Macedonia
- Coordinates: 40°59′07″N 21°04′06″E
- Country: North Macedonia
- Region: Pelagonia
- Municipality: Resen

Population (2002)
  - Total: 137
- Time zone: UTC+1 (CET)
  - Summer (DST): UTC+2 (CEST)
- Area code: +389
- Car plates: RE

Kurbinovo (Macedonian: Курбиново) is a village in the Resen Municipality of North Macedonia, northeast of Lake Prespa. The village is located nearly 13 kilometres (8.1 mi) south of the municipal centre of Resen. The village is best known for being home to the Church of St. George.

== Demographics ==
According to the statistics of Bulgarian ethnographer Vasil Kanchov from 1900, 200 inhabitants lived in Kurbinovo, all Bulgarian Christians. Kurbinovo has 137 inhabitants as of the most recent census of 2002, making it one of only four villages in the municipality that saw an increase in population from the previous census in 1994. The village population has been entirely ethnic Macedonian.

Ethnic group	census 1961		census 1971		census 1981		census 1991		census 1994		census 2002	
Ethnic group	Number	%	Number	%	Number	%	Number	%	Number	%	Number	%
Macedonians	229	100	248	100	182	100	183	100	122	100	137	100
Total	229		248		182		183		122		137	

== People from Kurbinovo ==
- Nestor Ivanov (1879 - ?), member of the Macedonian-Adrianopolitan Volunteer Corps
