= Atef Montasser =

Egyptian record producer

Atef Montasser عاطف فهيم محمد منتصر
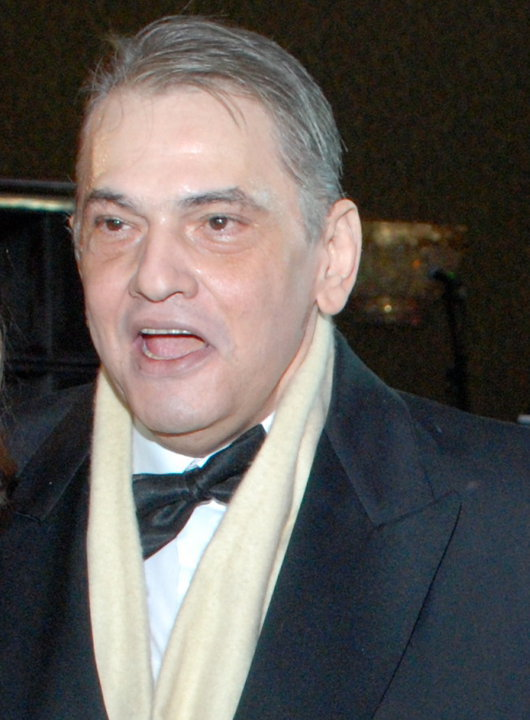

Background information
- Born: September 15, 1948; Tanta, Gharbia Governorate, Egypt
- Died: April 14, 2018 (aged 69)
- Website: soutelhob.com

Atef Fahim Mohamed Montasser (15 September 1948 – 14 April 2018) was an Egyptian record producer, A&R executive and the founder of Sout El-Hob Records. Montasser is credited with discovering singing talents in Egypt and the Arab world like Hany Shaker, Ahmed Adaweyah, Aziza Jalal, Mohammad Fouad, Medhat Saleh, Omar Fathi, El Masryeen, Four M and Metkal Kenawy. He is credited with bringing Algerian singer Warda to prominence.

== Early life and career ==
Atef Montasser was born on September 15, 1948, in Tanta city, Al-Gharbiya Governorate, Egypt. He graduated from the Faculty of Commerce, Cairo University. He has four siblings: Samia, Ahmed, Mohamed Abdel-Mon’em and Mostafa.

At the outset of his career, he worked at a construction company owned by his family. When he turned 22, he wanted to resign and make a career shift. At that time, he met Ma’moun al-Shinnawy, a poet, and the latter made him an offer to establish a records company. After serious negotiations with his father, who rejected the idea at first, he and his elder brother eventually agreed to lend him money to establish his company in one of their construction company's rooms in 1972. They called the company “Sout El-Hob”. Ma’moun al-Shinnawy worked as the company's artistic advisor. Mohsen Gaber, the owner of “Alam El-Phan” company and “Mazzika” TV channels is Atef Montasser's cousin, Mohsen also worked with Atef as a physical distributor before he set up his own company.

== Sout El-Hob Records ==
Hany Shaker is one of the first singers Montasser has discovered their talents and produced his first 4 releases. Montasser is credited with discovering the talents of Ahmed Adaweyah, Aziza Jalal, Mohammad Fouad, Medhat Saleh, and Metkal Kenawy. He is credited with bringing Algerian singer, Warda to prominence. He also produced her movie entitled “Ah ya liel ya zaman” in 1977. Sout El-Hob has distributed many movies domestically and abroad under the name “Sout El-Hob Movies (Atef Montasser and his Partners)”. Sout El-Hob also has recorded Omar Khairat’s music and the recited Quran by Sheikh Mahmoud Khalil Al-Hussary. The Quran was composed of 31 cassettes. Also, his company has recorded the Quran recited by Mohamed al-Tablawi. Montasser has revived the musical heritage of Sayed Darwish after discovering the talent of Iman El Bahr Darwish. He has recorded the songs of Fayza Ahmed and Najat Al Saghira on cassettes for the first time. Moreover, he has produced a song titled “Fe Aman Allah” by Mohammed Abdu in his early career.

Atef Montasser met composer Hany Shenouda in the mid-1970s and they established “El Masryeen Band”. The first cassette for the band, containing eight short songs, was released in 1977. The recording process took eight months. Earlier, Montasser has imported cassettes from Germany and Switzerland. Members of the band were: Mona Aziz, Eman Younis, Tahseen Yalmaz, Mamdouh Qassem and Omar Fathi. Many prominent poets have written songs for the band, including Salah Jahin and Omar Batesha. In addition, Montasser met also Doctor Ezzat Abu Ouf in the mid-1970s. They established together a band titled “Four M”. Members of the band were Ezzat Abu Ouf's sisters: Mona, Maha, Manal and Mervat.

EMI Records Ltd, a British-American records company and one of Universal Music Group companies, selected Sout El-Hob to be its partner and take charge of its production in the Arab world in 1985. This partnership lasted six years. Sout El-Hob is the fourth largest Arabic music catalogue in the Middle East and North Africa (MENA). Atef Montasser has produced nearly 351 albums and 1830 songs.

=== Sout El-Hob artists ===
- Ahmed Adaweyah
- Warda Al-Jazairia
- El Masryeen Band
- Hamid Al-Shairi
- Mohammad Fouad
- Medhat Saleh
- Leila Mourad
- Omar Khairat
- Hany Shaker
- Najat Al Saghira
- Iman El Bahr Darwish
- Aziza Jalal
- Fatma Eid
- Fayza Ahmed
- Four M
- Hany Mehanna
- Hany Shanouda
- Huda Sultan
- Mohamed El-Helw
- Majd El Qassem
- Mohammed Tharwat
- Mohammed Abdu
- Metkal Kenawy

=== Songs the label has recorded ===
- "El Sah El Dah Embo" by Ahmed Adaweyah
- "Esmaouny" by Warda Al-Jazairia
- "Fe El Seka" by Mohammad Fouad
- "Keda Bardo Ya Amar" by Hany Shaker
- "Kawkab Tany" by Medhat Saleh
- "Matehsebosh Ya Banat" by El Masryeen Band
- "El Leila El Kebira" by Four M band
- "Mahsobkom Endas" by Iman El Bahr Darwish
- "Fe Aman Allah" by Mohammed Abdu

== Death ==
Atef Montasser died on April 14, 2018. His funeral was conducted in Omar Makram Mosque in downtown Cairo. He was buried in the family's cemetery at Nasr City.
