= Sout El-Hob Records =

Egyptian record label

Sout El-Hob صوت الحب
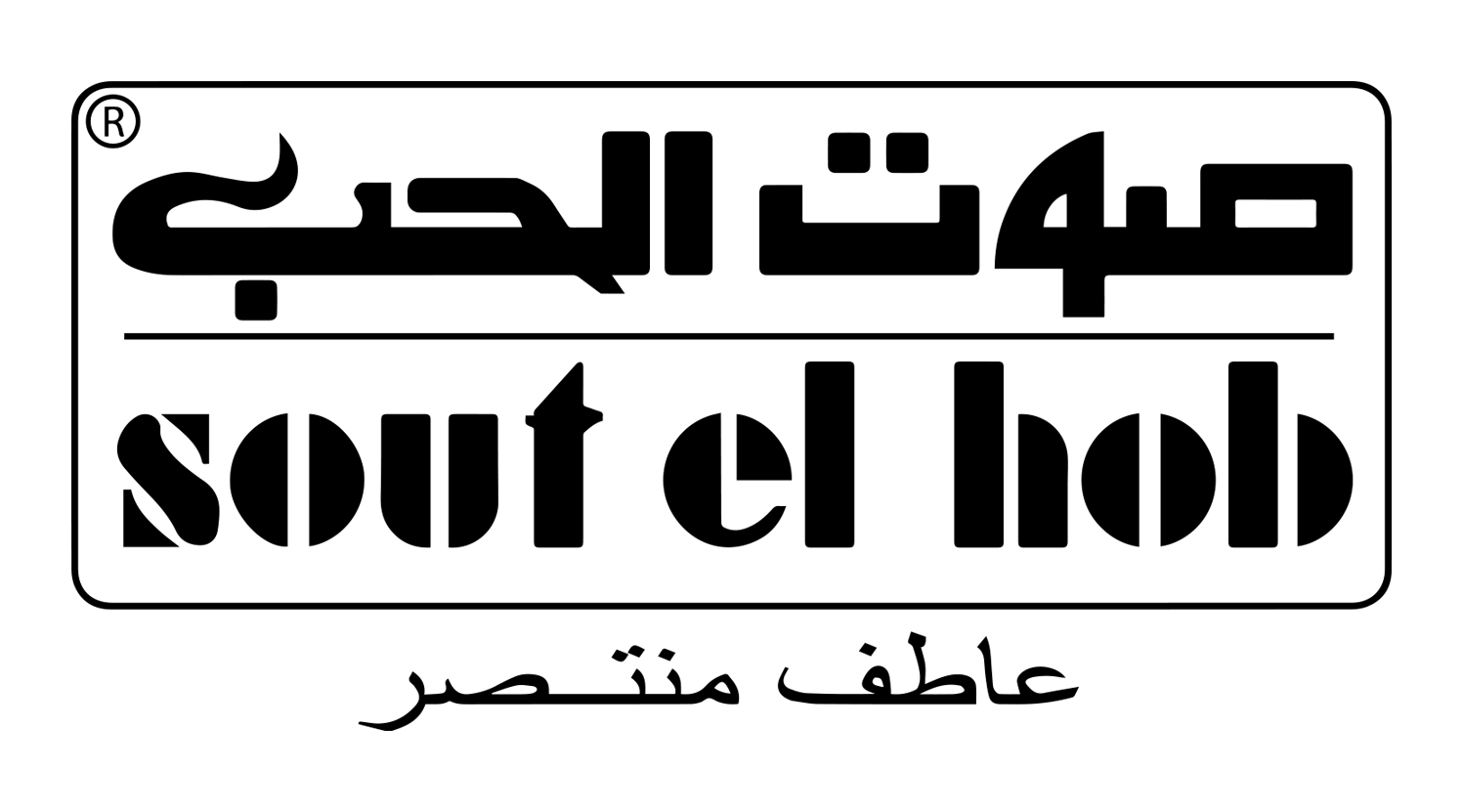
- Parent company: Dozzan Music Group
- Founded: 1972; 54 years ago
- Founder: Atef Montasser
- Status: Active
- Distributors: Sout El-Hob Entertainment, Modissa
- Genre: Various
- Country of origin: Egypt
- Location: Giza, Egypt
- Official website: soutelhob.com

Sout El-Hob Records (from Arabic:صوت الحب للإنتاج الفني والتوزيع, "The Voice of Love") is an Egyptian record label founded in 1972 by Atef Montasser. Sout El-Hob has the 4th largest Arabic music catalog in the Middle East & North Africa. It has also distributed many movies domestically and abroad under the name of “Sout El-Hob Movies." Mohsen also worked with Atef as a distributor before he set up his own company.

== Ownership ==
In 2015, Sherif Montasser, Atef Montasser’s nephew, took over Sout El-Hob as owner and chief executive officer through Sout El-Hob Entertainment, one of the companies Dozzan Music Group owns.

== Content ==
Hany Shaker is one of the first singers that Sout El-Hob discovered and produced his first 4 releases. Montasser is credited with discovering the talents of Ahmed Adaweyah, Aziza Jalal, Mohamed Fouad, Medhat Saleh, and Metkal Kenawy. He is also credited with bringing the Algerian singer Warda to prominence, and he produced one of her movies entitled “Ah ya liel ya zaman” in 1977. Sout El-Hob has distributed many movies domestically and abroad under the name of “Sout El-Hob Movies (Atef Montasser and his Partners)”, and recorded Omar Khairat’s music, the recited Quran by Sheikh Mahmoud Khalil Al-Hussary. The Quran was composed of 31 cassettes and recited by Mohamed al-Tablawi. Sout El-Hob has revived the musical heritage of Sayed Darwish after discovering the talent of Iman El Bahr Darwish, and recorded the songs of Fayza Ahmed and Najat on cassettes for the first time. Moreover, Sout El-Hob has produced a song titled “Fe Aman Allah” by Mohammed Abdu in his early career.

Atef Montasser met composer Hani Shenouda in the mid-1970s, and they established “El-Masryeen Band”. The first cassette for the band was released in 1977, containing eight short songs. The recording process took eight months and the cassette tapes were imported from Germany and Switzerland. The members of the band included Mona Aziz, Eman Younis, Tahseen Yalmaz, Mamdouh Qassem and Omar Fathi. Many prominent poets have written songs for the band, including Salah Jahin and Omar Batesha. Montasser also met Doctor Ezzat Abu Ouf in the mid-1970s and they established together a band titled “Four M”. The members of the band were Ezzat Abu Ouf's sisters: Mona, Maha, Manal and Mervat.

EMI, a British record company, selected Sout El-Hob to be its partner and take charge of its production in the Arab world in 1984. This partnership lasted for six years. Sout El-Hob has the fourth largest Arabic music catalog in the Middle East and North Africa (MENA). In 2013, EMI was acquired by Universal Music, its subsidiaries were subsequently broken up, and portions of the company were sold to other entities. Sout El-Hob was eventually acquired by Mazzika Group.

== Sout El-Hob artists ==
=== Notable artists who have recorded for the company ===
- Ahmed Adaweyah
- Warda Al-Jazairia
- El-Masryeen Band
- Hamid Al-Shairi
- Mohammad Fouad
- Medhat Saleh
- Radi Zeus
- Leila Mourad
- Omar Khairat
- Hany Shaker
- Najat Al Saghira
- Iman El Bahr Darwish
- Aziza Jalal
- Fatma Eid
- Fayza Ahmed
- Four M
- Hany Mehanna
- Hany Shanouda
- Huda Sultan
- Mohamed El-Helw
- Majd El Qassem
- Mohammed Tharwat
- Mohammed Abdu
- Metkal Kenawy

== Sout El-Hob songs ==
=== Some of Sout El-Hob's iconic songs ===
- "El Sah El Dah Embo" by Ahmed Adaweyah
- "Esmaouny" by Warda Al-Jazairia
- "Fe El Seka" by Mohammad Fouad
- "Keda Bardo Ya Amar" by Hany Shaker
- "Kawkab Tany" by Medhat Saleh
- "Matehsebosh Ya Banat" by El-Masryeen Band
- "El Leila El Kebira" by Four M band
- "Mahsobkom Endas" by Iman El Bahr Darwish
- "Fe Aman Allah" by Mohammed Abdu

== Artist and labels with music distributed by Modissa ==
=== Notable artists ===
- Amr Diab
- Fairuz
- Tamer Hosny
- Ahmed Mekky
- Amal Maher
- Hany shaker
- Adham Seliman
- Cairokee
- Tamer Ashour
- Mahmoud El Esseily
- Mohamed El Sharnouby
- Abyusif
- Radi Zeus
- Illmagdy
- Cheb Khaled
- Sherine
- Nawal El Zoughbi
- Saber Rebaei
- Amr Mostafa
- Carmen Seliman
- Angham
- Nancy Ajram

=== Notable record labels ===
- Sout El-Hob (Entire catalog)
- Sonar (Entire catalog)
- Watary
- Sout El Delta
- Randaphone
- Takima
- El Sobky
