= Islam Elbeiti =

Sudanese musician and social activist (1994-)

- إسلام البيتي
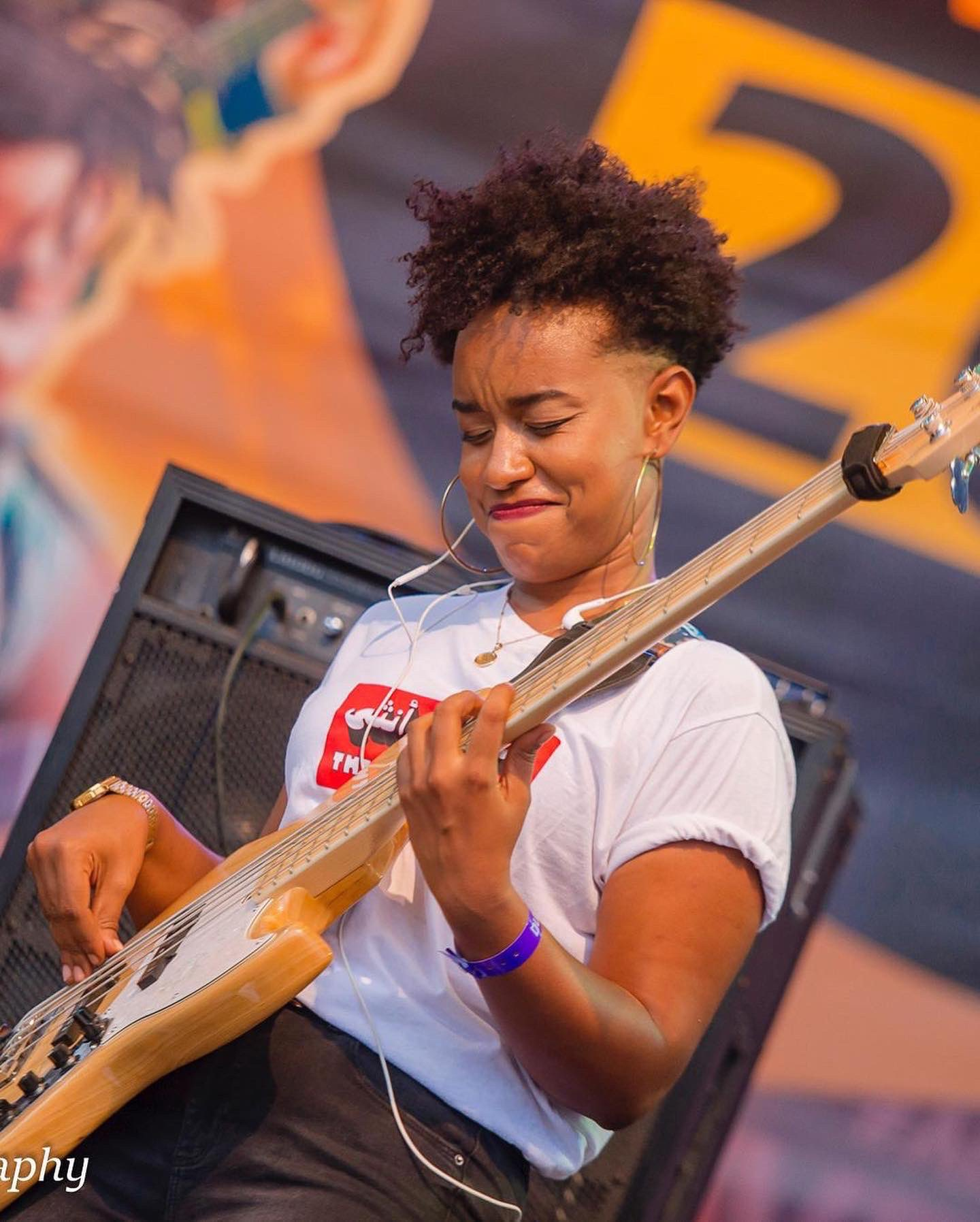
- Elbeiti at Sauti za Busara 2021 in Zanzibar
- Born: April 3, 1994 (age 32)
- Education: University of Medical Sciences & Technology, Khartoum
- Musical career
- Genres: Jazz; African popular music
- Instrument: Electric bass guitar
- Years active: 2013–present
- Website: islamelbeiti.com

Islam Elbeiti (born April 3, 1994 in Khartoum, Sudan) is a Sudanese bass player, radio presenter, and social change activist.

== Early life ==
Elbeiti was born in Khartoum, the capital of Sudan, as the eldest of five children, one brother and three sisters. She grew up in Sudan, Ethiopia, China and the Democratic Republic of Congo (DRC).

== Musical career ==
Elbeiti plays jazz, reggae and Afro-pop in different bands on the electric bass guitar. In December 2017, she contributed to the music and arts department of the first edition of Karmakol International Festival, which was held in the village of Karmakol in northern Sudan. This festival was organized by civil society groups to showcase Sudan's rich contemporary culture and attracted both Sudanese and international visitors and artists. Elbeiti also performed live on stage with the well-known UAE-based Sudanese singer-songwriter Nile.

In 2021, Zakia Abdul Gassim Abu Bakr, the first female guitarist in Sudan and wife of Sharhabil Ahmed, announced the forthcoming release of an album by her all-women's band Sawa Sawa, including Islam Elbeiti.

== Education and professional activities ==
Elbeiti graduated from the University of Medical Sciences & Technology (UMST) in Khartoum with a Bachelor's degree in business administration and management. She was also a radio presenter at Capital Radio 91.6 FM in Khartoum for a show called "Jazzified", where she talked about jazz-related topics.

== Social activism ==
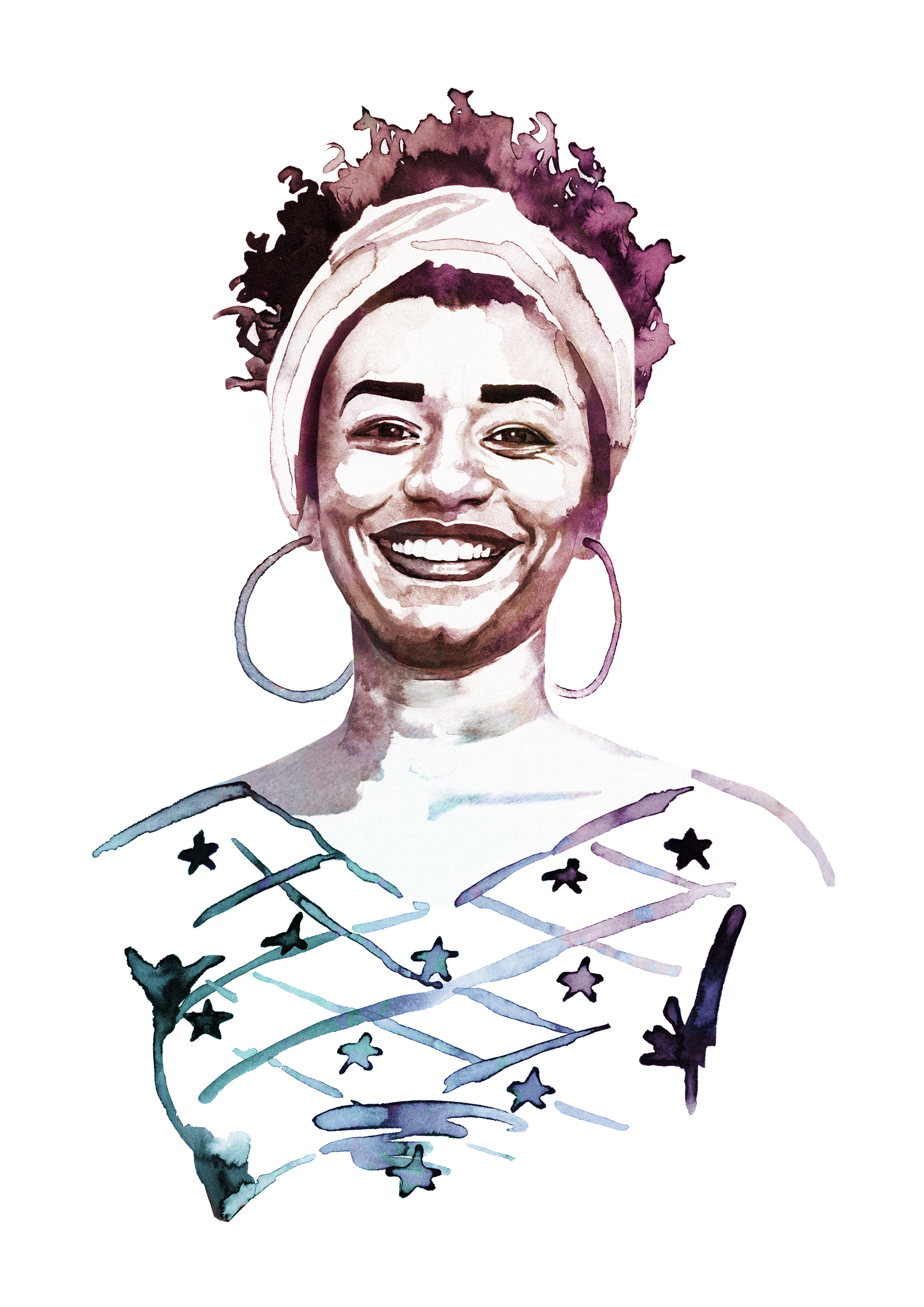
An ink portrait of Islam Elbeiti by Candace Di Talamo for Inspiring Open podcast project by Wiki Loves Women in 2022.

Islam Elbeiti has led and participated in several projects that have propelled entrepreneurship and cultural industries in Sudan and beyond. Islam's experience ranges from co-founding the first Sudanese entrepreneurship and innovation network for promoting the development of informal music education in Africa through the Global Music Association. She is the co-founder of the Sudanese Innovative Music Association.

Further, she works as a cultural consultant and project manager for CEEZ (Creative Education and Empowerment Zanzibar). In addition, she is a member of the Pan-African Policy Innovation Foundation, which focuses on democratic political reform.

As part of her activities in civil society, she has been a Program Manager at the global network Impact Hub in Khartoum. She is also a member of the i4Policy Task force, an organization that works in democratizing policy-making with specific emphasis on entrepreneurship.

In 2017, she gave a talk on a TEDxYouth event in Kinshasa, in the form of a spoken word poem entitled Don't Kill Them. In August 2019, Elbeiti was nominated by the British Council in Sudan as 'Artist of the Month", both for her activities as a musician and for her involvement in civil society.

== See also ==
- Music of Sudan
- African popular music
