= Alf Leila wa Leila =

1969 song by Umm Kulthum

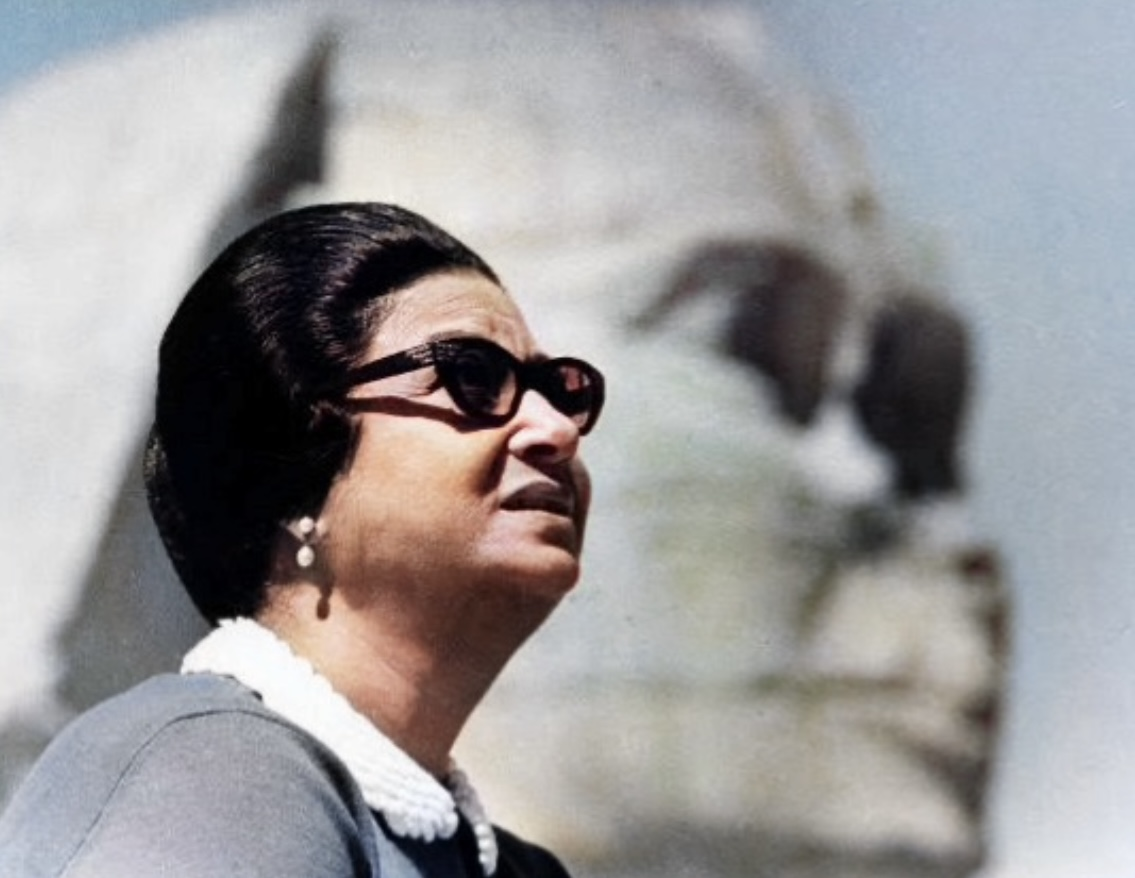
Umm Kulthum photographed near the Sphinx in Giza, Egypt, in 1969. The year Alf Leila wa Leila was released.

Alf Leïla wa Leïla (Arabic: ألف ليلة وليلة, lit. 'A Thousand and One Nights') is a Classical Egyptian Arabic song performed by the Egyptian singer Umm Kulthum. First performed in 1969, this song remains one of the most celebrated and iconic pieces in Umm Kulthum's extensive repertoire. Known for its intricate musical composition and evocative lyrics, Alf Leila wa Leila captivated audiences across the Arab world and solidified Umm Kulthum's legacy as "the Star of the Orient" (Arabic: كوكب الشرق, romanized: Kawkab Al Sharq). The song was written by poet Morsi Jamil Aziz and composed by Baligh Hamdi, who had a long-standing relationship with Umm Kulthum. Together, they produced some of the most memorable music in the history of Arabic song. This song is the third song sung by Umm Kulthum with lyrics by Morsi Gamil Aziz, after the songs “Seret El Hob” (1964), and “Fat El Ma'ad” (1967), which was her last meeting with him, and the three songs were composed by Baligh Hamdi.

Umm Kulthum, one of the most beloved and influential singers in the Arab world, released Alf Leila wa Leila during the peak of her career. By this time, she had already established herself as a powerhouse in Arabic music with a career that spanned decades.

The song's title, Alf Leila wa Leila, translates to A Thousand and One Nights—a direct reference to the famous collection of Middle Eastern folk tales One Thousand and One Nights, which had a profound influence on Arabic literature and culture. The themes of love, fantasy, and storytelling that are woven into the original tales are mirrored in the song's lyrics and structure.

== Composition and lyrics ==
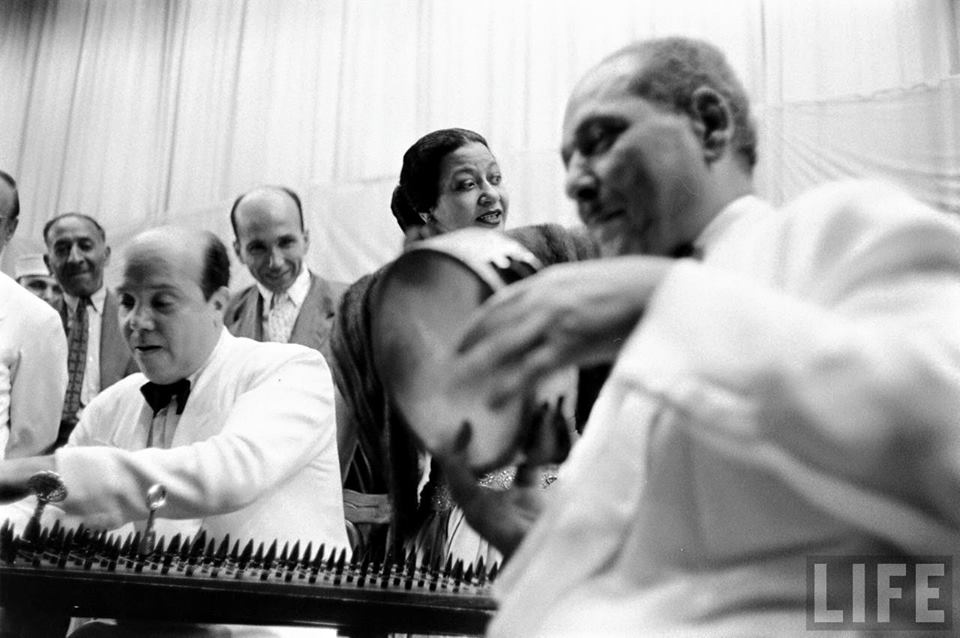
Umm Kulthum on the stage with her band

When the writer Morsi Gamal Aziz brought the lyrics of the song Alf Leila wa Leila for Umm Kulthum to read, she was greatly impressed and immediately chose the young composer Baligh Hamdi to compose it. She handed him the lyrics and advised him, saying, “I want this song to be a huge success, and I know you won’t let me down.” Baligh requested time, saying, “Don’t look for me until I’ve completed the composition.”

Baligh disappeared for three weeks, and no one knew where he was. Umm Kulthum grew concerned and began asking about him. She even reached out to her contacts to help find him. After a period of searching, he was finally located in a chalet. Umm Kulthum immediately went to him, surprised, and asked, “Where have you been all this time? And how’s the song coming along?” He replied, “Didn’t I ask you, Umm Kulthum, not to look for me until I had it fully composed and ready?”

She responded, “But you’ve taken a long time, and that’s unusual!” To her surprise, he had not yet finished composing the first part and had only completed the musical introduction. Umm Kulthum was astonished and asked him to play what he had composed. As he began playing, she listened intently, and a satisfied smile slowly appeared on her face. When he finished, she got up and said, “Take your time, even if it takes another three months.”

The lyrics of Alf Leila wa Leila are a poetic love letter, rich in metaphor and romantic imagery. The song tells the story of two lovers who are drawn together by the magic and allure of the night, echoing the dreamlike qualities of the tales from A Thousand and One Nights. With lines like "This is a beautiful night of love, worth thousand nights and a night. The night before that it was strange, strange, now i found peace in it, and life that was a desert, a desert, became now a garden," the song evokes a timeless sense of passion and enchantment.

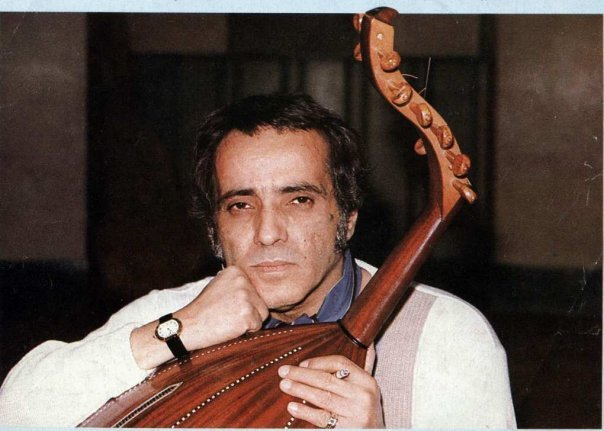
Baligh Hamdi in the year the song was released

One of the distinguishing features of Alf Leila wa Leila is its length and musical complexity. At around 50 minutes in duration, the song takes the listener on an emotional journey through various musical movements. Baligh Hamdi's composition draws upon both classical Arabic music and modern orchestral influences, blending traditional instruments like the qanun and oud with modern strings, percussion, and brass.

Umm Kulthum was known for her live performances, during which she often extended her songs to over an hour by repeating lines and stanzas in new, emotionally charged ways, responding to audience reactions in real-time. This technique, known as tarab, refers to the emotional catharsis that listeners experience during performances and is a hallmark of her style.

Alf Leila wa Leila was no exception to this. When performed live, Umm Kulthum would engage in spontaneous improvisation, modifying the song's structure and rhythm based on the atmosphere of the venue and the interaction with the audience. This added an additional layer of depth and uniqueness to each live rendition, making every performance of Alf Leila wa Leila a singular event.

The song opens with a musical introduction featuring multiple solo performances on different instruments. In the final part of the introduction, which includes the accordion and saxophone, composer Baligh Hamdi incorporates elements of folk music. Despite its Western origin, the saxophone is used to effectively convey a traditional folk atmosphere.

The final section of the song concludes with a prayer, divided into two parts. The first part features a romantic melody, beginning with the phrase "O Lord, keep the sweetness of the first meeting's greeting in our hands." The second part transitions to a more folkloric tone, starting with the phrase "And may the bitter cup of separation never be served to us."

== Musical structure ==
The song follows a traditional Arabic form, composed on the Farah Faza maqam, a derivative of the Nahawand scale, which is commonly used by Arab composers in romantic songs. However, the composition by Baligh Hamdi incorporates elements of Western orchestral arrangements, blending classical Arabic music with contemporary sounds. The song is structured into distinct sections, alternating between slow and fast rhythms that convey different emotions. The introduction features orchestration with strings, setting a dramatic tone, followed by more intimate sections where Umm Kulthum's vocals become the focus.

Hamdi's use of crescendos, instrumental solos, and complex rhythmic patterns creates a mix of traditional and modern influences, distinguishing the song from some of Umm Kulthum's earlier, more conventional works.

== Cultural impact ==
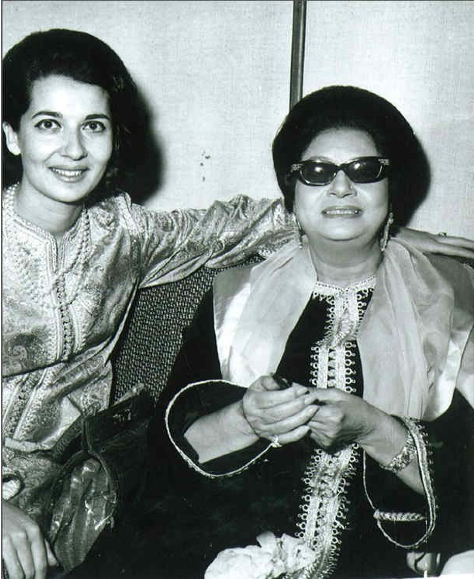
Umm Kulthum and Moroccan stylist Naima Bennis before taking the stage to perform.

The release of Alf Leila wa Leila occurred during a period when Umm Kulthum's influence was widespread across Egypt and the Arab world. Her concerts were broadcast on the radio, reaching audiences from Morocco to Iraq. The song gained significant popularity.

The song's success is also linked to its timing. The 1960s were a period of political change, the rise of Arab nationalism, and modernization in Egypt and the broader Arab world. As a result, Umm Kulthum's music, including Alf Leila wa Leila was regarded as both a reflection of cultural heritage and a step toward the evolving landscape of Arab music.

The song has been covered by numerous artists across the Arab world, and its influence can be heard in the works of many contemporary Arab musicians. The song continues to be performed at events in the Arab world, and was even featured during the wedding of Jordanian Crown Prince Hussein at Al Husseiniya Palace. Beyond the world of music, Alf Leila wa Leila has also left a lasting impression on Arab popular culture. The song has been referenced in films, television shows, and even literature, further cementing its status as a cultural touchstone.
