= Al Massrieen =

Egyptian music group

- Origin: Egypt
- Genres: Disco, funk, Arabic pop
- Years active: 1977–1988
- Labels: Sout El-Hob; Alam El Phan; EMI Araby; Habibi Funk
- Past members: Iman Younis; Mona Aziz; Hany Shenoda; Tahsin Zalmaz; Mamdouh Qasem; Omar Fatih

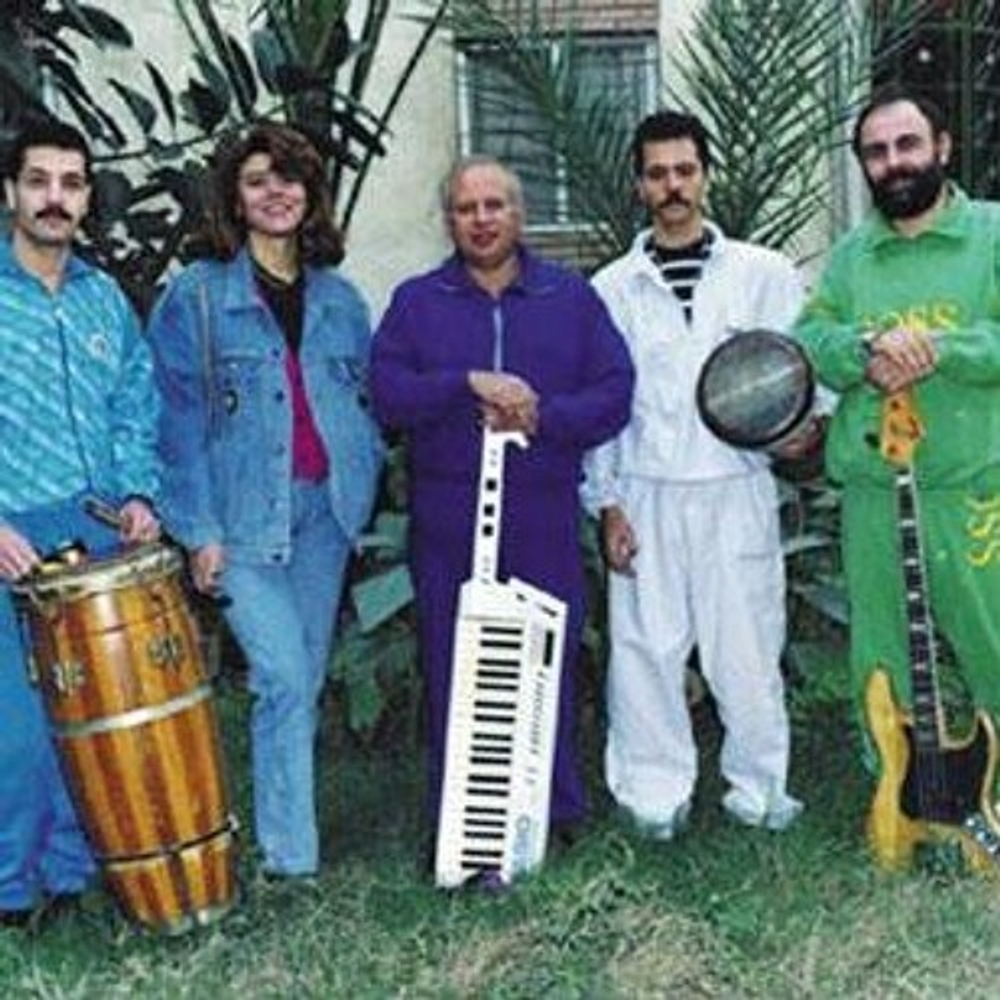
The Egyptian Band gathered in an old restored photo. Band members: Mona Aziz, Iman Younis, Tahseen Yalmaz, Mamdouh Qassem

Al Massrieen (Arabic: المصريين, lit. 'Egyptians') was an Egyptian pop band active during the 1970s and 1980s. Their work, mainly released on cassette tapes, was compiled by the German record label Jakarta Records/Habibi Funk on the album Modern Music (2017).

The band's founder, Hany Shenoda, was reportedly advised by writer Naguib Mahfouz to give his production a modern sound. Al Massrieen drew its influences from disco, psychedelic rock, and jazz, ranging from the disco of the song "Sah", to the psychedelic rock of "Horreya", and to jazz pop in songs like "Edba Men Gedeed". Despite its versatility, the band remained unknown outside of Egypt, likely due to the fact that their releases were never recorded on vinyl.

== Discography ==
- Bihabk ... la (1978)
- Huriya (1979)
- Banat katir (1979)
- Ebda Men Gedeed (1982)
- Hazu aleadalaa (1988)

=== Compilations ===
- The Best of Al Massrieen (1980)
- Modern Music (2017)
