= Fat El Ma'ad =

1967 song by Umm Kulthum

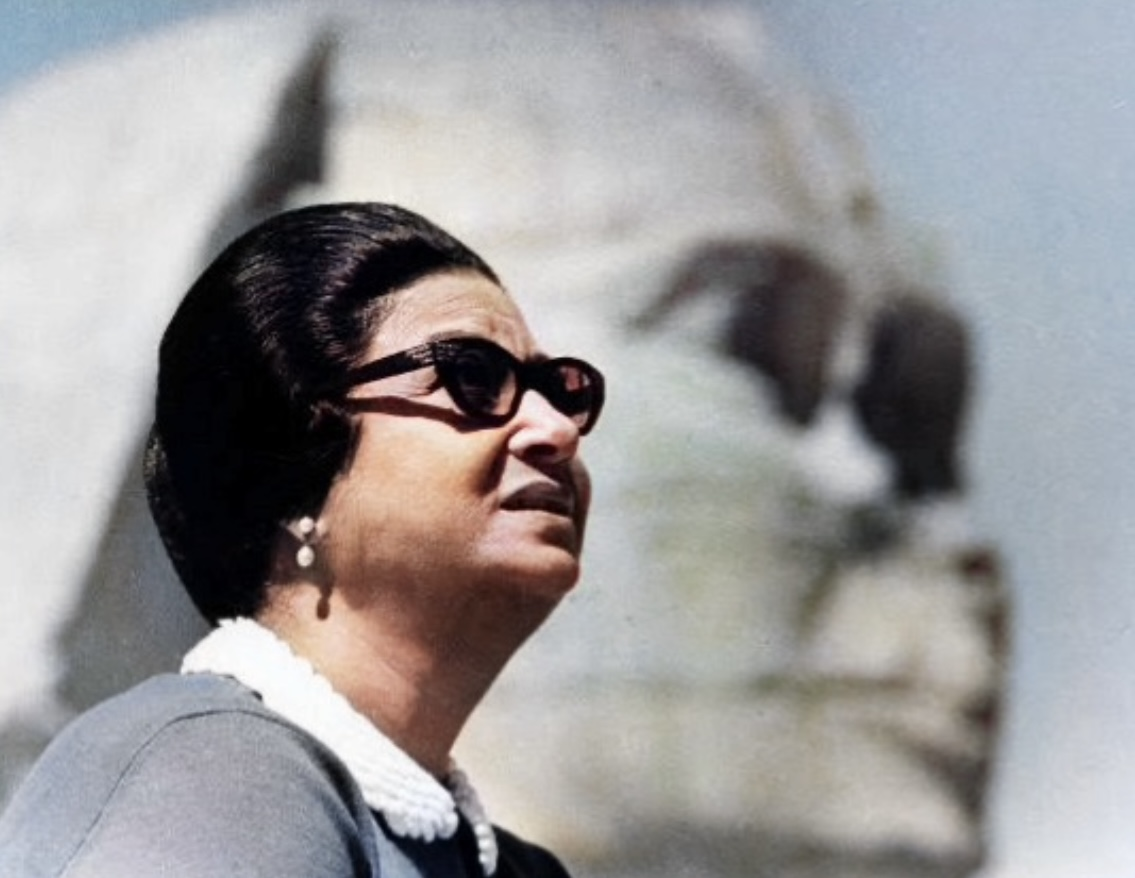
Umm Kulthum photographed in Giza, Egypt in 1967

Fat El Ma'ad (Egyptian Arabic: فات الميعاد, romanized: fat elmiʿad, lit. 'The Time Has Passed') is one of the iconic songs by the Egyptian singer Umm Kulthum. It was written by Morsi Jamil Aziz, composed by Baligh Hamdi, and sung in 1967. This song is the second collaboration between Umm Kulthum and lyricist Morsi Gamil Aziz, following "Seret El Hob" (1964) and before "Alf Leila wa Leila" (1969), which marked their final collaboration. All three songs were composed by Baligh. Renowned for its profound lyrics, intricate musical composition, and Umm Kulthum's unparalleled vocal delivery, this song remains a significant piece in the history of Arabic music. It is composed in maqam "Sigah".

== Composition and lyrics ==
Umm Kulthum, often referred to as "The Star of the Orient" and "The Fourth Pyramid," was an Egyptian singer, songwriter, and actress who became a cultural icon in the Arab world. Her career spanned over five decades, during which she captivated audiences with her powerful voice and emotive performances. "Fat El Ma'ad" is one of her song that highlight her talent.

=== The story of the song ===
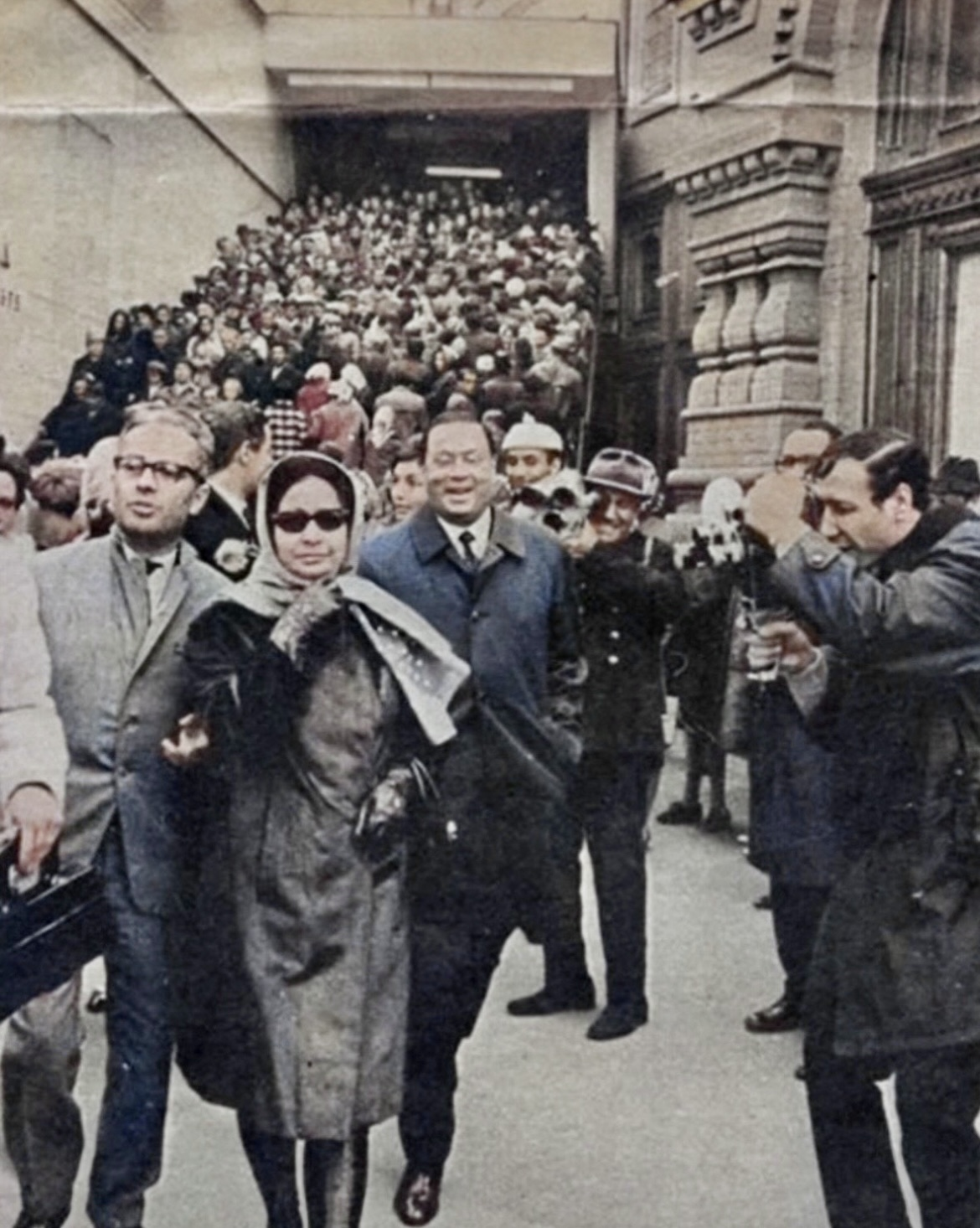
Umm Kulthum going to her Olympia concert in Paris, November 12, 1967.

"Fat El Ma'ad" represents the second collaboration between Umm Kulthum and the lyricist Morsi Jamil Aziz, following their earlier song "Seret El Hob" (Egyptian Arabic: سيرة الحب, lit. 'Biography of Love') in 1964, also composed by the Baligh Hamdi. In 1962, Hamdi composed a melancholic melody for Umm Kulthum titled "You and I, We Have Been Oppressed by Love" (Egyptian Arabic: أنا وأنت ظلمنا الحب). Unfortunately, it did not gain widespread popularity, possibly due to its sorrowful tone. Recognizing the subtle differences between composing a long theatrical piece and a shorter song, Hamdi, when presented with the melancholic lyrics of "Fat El Ma'ad," decided to infuse the composition with some lighter, more cheerful melodies without disrupting the overall somber atmosphere of the song.

The piece begins with a calm musical introduction, skillfully blending various rhythms and prominently featuring the saxophone, played by Samir Srour. This song marked Srour's debut performance behind Umm Kulthum. The first verse, "Once I wish I could meet you with a smile," introduces a wonderful musical arrangement, blending the harmonious sounds of the saxophone, guitar, violin, qanun, and accordion.

The second section, "The night and the clocks awakens the night," showcases the violins playing a piece that leans towards an Egyptian folk atmosphere, a style for which Baligh Hamdi is particularly renowned. This section contains some of the song's most famous lines:

And you want us to get back as in the past;
tell time to go backward
and get me a heart that never melted, never loved,
and was never wounded nor ever deprived.

This song is notable as the only emotional song that Umm Kulthum sang in the year of 1967, a year marked by the defeat of the Arab armies in the Six-Day War, which halted the release of new music. Despite the challenges of the time, "Fat El Ma'ad" became one of the poignant songs that Umm Kulthum performed during her tour of Arab countries in the aftermath of the war.

=== Lyrics ===
The lyrics of "Fat El Ma'ad" delve into themes of love, longing, and the passage of time. They reflect the pain of missed opportunities and the melancholy of lost love. The song's narrative portrays a poignant story of a love that could not be fulfilled.

=== Musical structure ===
The song is characterized by its rich orchestration, featuring traditional Arabic instruments such as the oud, qanun, and ney, blended with Western orchestral elements. The music complements the emotional weight of the lyrics, creating an immersive listening experience.

== Legacy ==
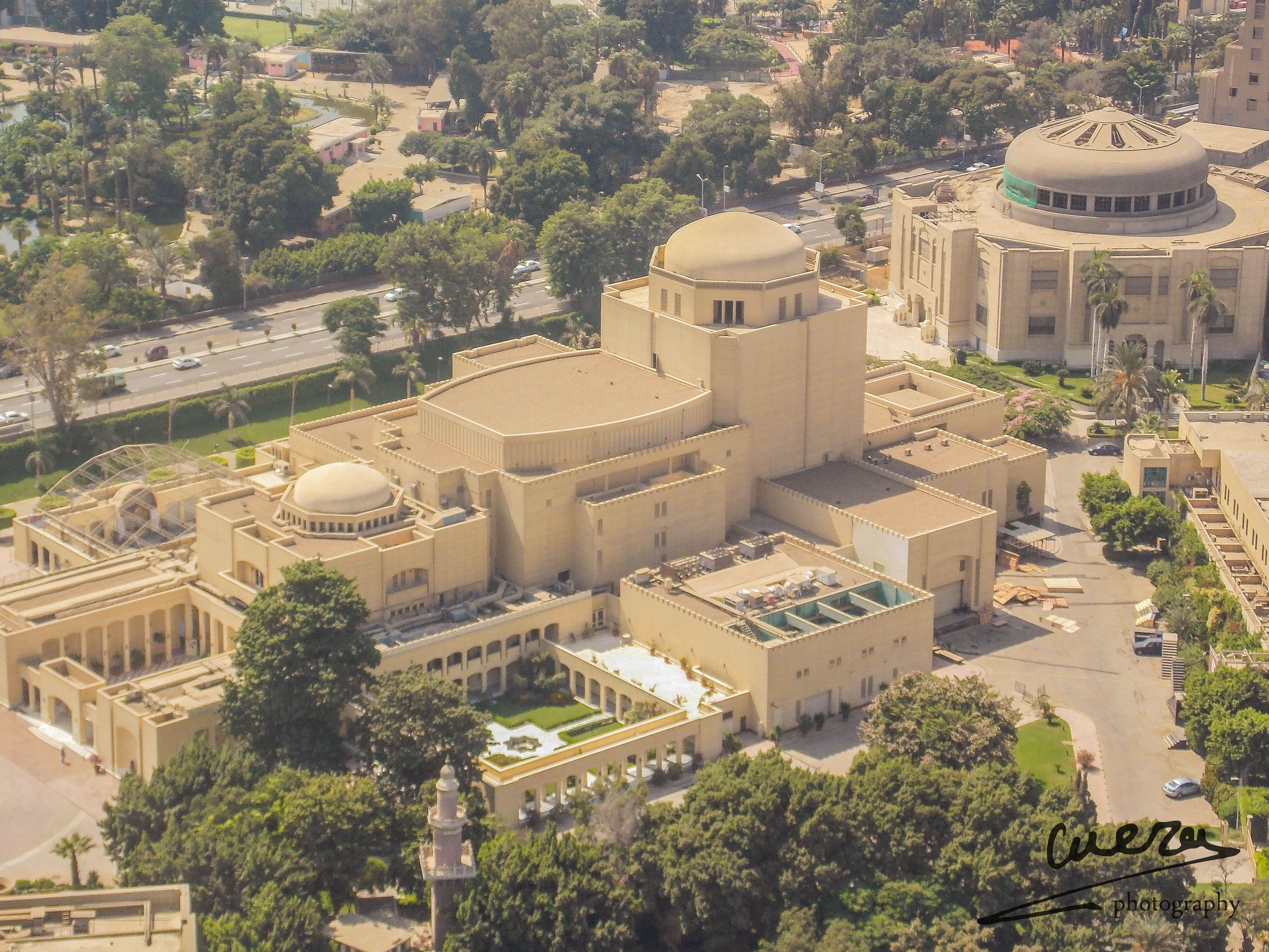
Cairo Opera House

"Fat El Ma'ad" has left a mark on Arabic music. The song continues to be celebrated for its artistic excellence and emotional depth. It has been covered by numerous artists and remains a staple in the repertoire of classical Arabic music. Many contemporary Arab musicians and singers cite Umm Kulthum and her songs, including "Fat El Ma'ad," as major influences on their work. The song's timeless appeal and the emotional resonance of its lyrics and composition continue to inspire new generations of artists. It is often associated with the golden age of Arabic music. The song is frequently played on national and regional radio stations, particularly during special occasions and cultural celebrations.

=== Notable performances ===
One of the most notable performances of "Fat El Ma'ad" took place at the Cairo Opera House, where Umm Kulthum delivered an unforgettable rendition of the song. This performance is often cited as one of the highlights of her career and is frequently referenced in discussions about her legacy.
