= Issam Hajali =

Lebanese musician

Issam Hajali is a Lebanese jazz and folk rock musician.

In 1975, when the civil war in Lebanon started, he was a guitarist of a progressive rock band Rainbow Bridge in Beirut. In 1976, Hajali, who was politically ultra-left, fled Lebanon with his wife, first to Cyprus, and then to Paris, where he stayed in 1977, before going back to Beirut. In his last week in Paris, Hajali, together with Rogér Fakhr, another Lebanese musician, and a number of musicians from various countries, whose names were eventually lost, recorded his debut album, Mouasalt Ila Jacad El Ard. The record combined santur with the Western-style music with vocals, jazz guitars, and synthesizers. The texts were taken from Palestinian revolutionary poet Samih al-Qasim. The album was not properly released at the time and circulated on tapes, with estimated 100 copies. In Beirut, it came to an attention of musician Ziad Rahbani who popularized it. In 2019, the record was re-released by Habibi Funk. One of the compositions, Ana Damir El Motakallim, has been compared with Stairway to Heaven and described as innovative in Lebanese music.

Back in Beirut in 1977, Hajali founded the band Ferkat Al Ard, which eventually recorded three albums.

In 1980, Hajali left political activism and eventually graduated with Master’s Degree in philosophy. He remarried and had children. As of 2019, he was running a jewelry shop in Beirut, was not performing, and his income was coming from selling his past compositions.

== Discography ==
=== Albums ===
==== Solo ====
- Mouasalat Ila Jacad El Ard (1977)

==== With Ferkat Al Ard ====
- Oghneya (1979)
- Tamul'at Alkuz Fi Tamuz (1983)
- Hi'ja (1985)

==== Appearances on other Works ====
- Ziad Rahbani - Abu Ali (1978)
- Tania Saleh - Tania Saleh (2002)
- Tania Saleh - A Few Images (2014)
- Roger Fakhr - Fine Anyway (1977/1978) ^(2021)
- Roger Fakr - East of Any Place (1977/1978) ^(2024)

_{^ indicates Compilation or Reissues that Issam is credited on.}
