= Sharhabil Ahmed =

Sudanese popular musician (born 1935)

Sharhabil Ahmed شرحبيل أحمد
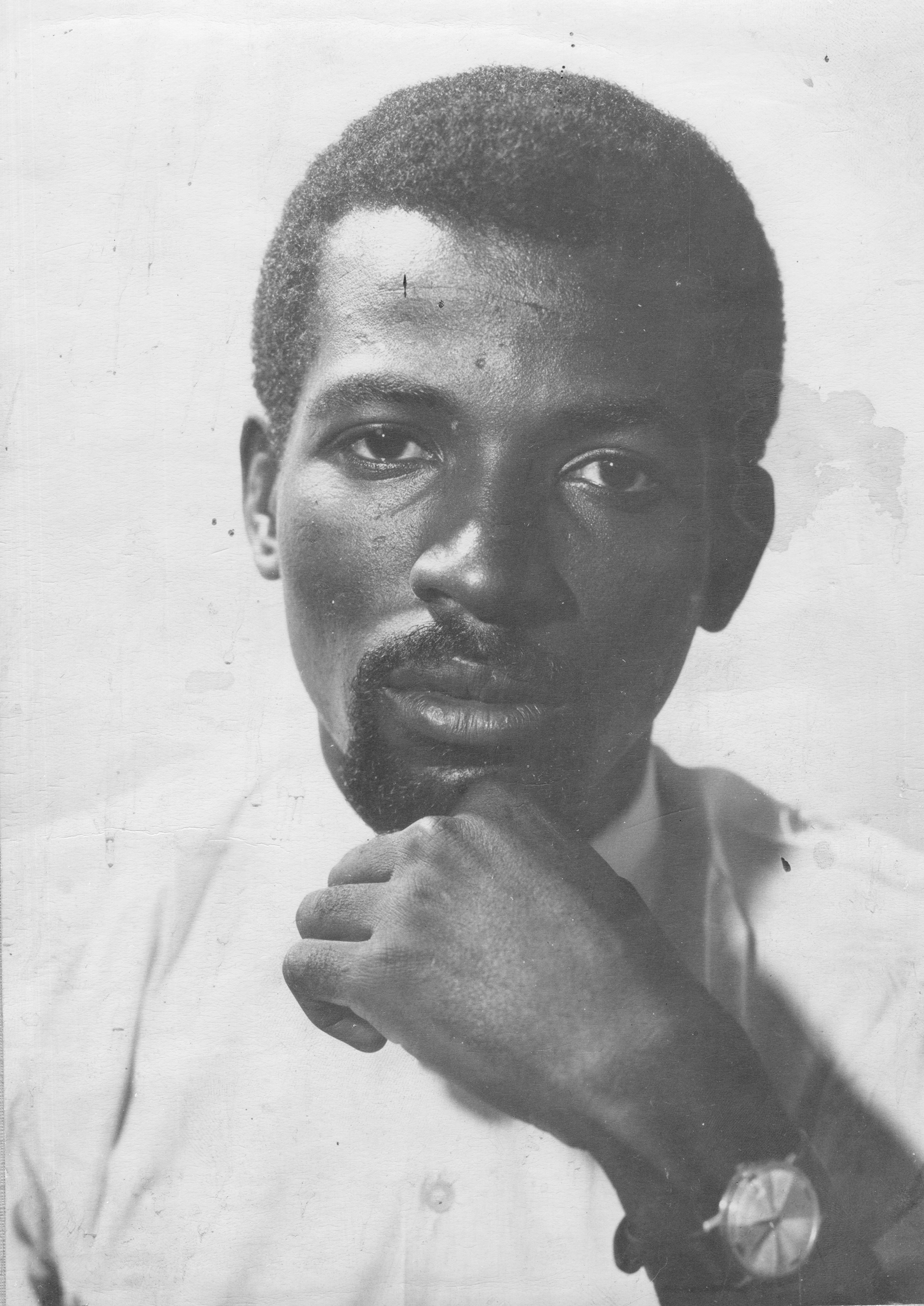
- Sharhabil Ahmed

Background information
- Born: 1935 (age 90–91); Omdurman, Sudan
- Genres: Music of Sudan, African popular music
- Occupations: singer-songwriter, composer, painter and illustrator
- Instruments: vocals, guitar, oud, multiple instruments
- Years active: 1957–present
- Label: Habibi Funk
- Spouse: Zakia Abu Gassim Abu Bakr

Sharhabil Ahmed, sometimes also Sharhabeel Ahmed (Arabic: شرحبيل أحمد, born 1935), is a Sudanese popular musician, known for his distinctive style of singing, compositions, oud and guitar playing. Inspired by Western dance music like rock music and adding brass instruments to his electric lead guitar, he has been called The King of Sudanese Jazz. He has composed numerous songs and performed all over Sudan, as well as in Europe, Africa and in the Gulf countries, where large communities of Sudanese in exile reside.

== Personal life ==
Ahmed's father was a religious man, but the family already owned a phonograph and liked both religious madeeh singing as well as popular haqiba music. In an interview with the Egyptian newspaper Al-Ahram, Ahmed remembered: "My biggest worry was how not to upset my father, who was interested in Sufism, and was fond of madeeh, but felt that music and art distracted me from my studies."

As his father worked as a truck driver, the family frequently moved from one part of Sudan to another. Ahmed grew up in Al-Obeid, the capital of former Kordofan province, in Western Sudan, and eventually enrolled at the College of Fine and Applied Arts in Khartoum, where he studied graphic design. After graduation, he joined the Ministry of Education as an illustrator for textbooks and comics magazines. He worked for several children's magazines, such as Al-Sabian, Maryud and Sabah, from 1960 until he retired from the Ministry of Education in 1995.

Sharhabil's wife, Zakia Abdul Gassim Abu Bakr, was the first female professional guitarist in Sudan, and several of their seven sons and daughters also have become musicians. In 2021, Zakia announced the forthcoming release of an album by her all-female band Sawa Sawa, including bass player Islam Elbeiti.

== Musical career ==
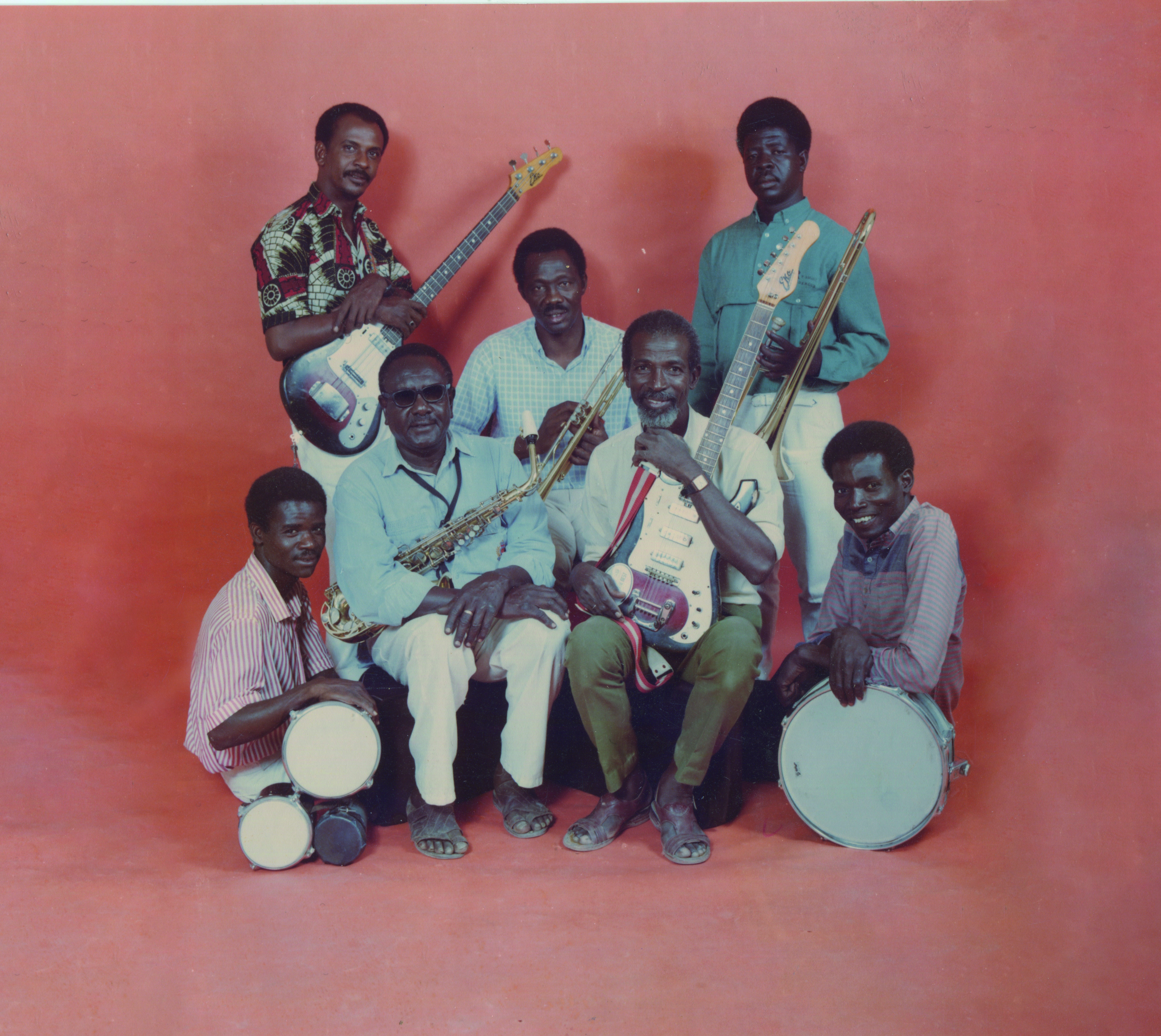
Sharhabil Ahmed and his band (date unknown)

Before becoming a guitar player, Sharhabil learned to play the oud, saxophone, trombone and trumpet. But it was the electric guitar that eventually became his favourite instrument, noting that "Western instruments can approximate the scales of Sudanese music very well." Use of the electric guitar, in the neighbouring Democratic Republic of the Congo, had contributed to the influence of South American and Caribbean sounds on Congolese music, which then had an important influence on Sudanese popular music in the 1960s. His smooth voice, full of vibrato, has added to his popularity.

In an interview, Sharhabil recalled his performance on New Year's Eve 1971 at St. James' Music Hall, the most important music venue in Khartoum at the time. During this show, he was called The King of Sudanese Jazz, a title that has been associated with him ever since.

Even though he has included saxophones and trumpets, his style of music has not much in common with the Western notion of Jazz music. Rather, Sharhabil's sound is known as a unique combination of rock, funk, and Congolese music with a typical Sudanese character. Combining his soft vocals with the distinct sound of urban Sudanese music, he and his band became one of Sudan's most sought-after music groups. Over the years of his long career, he has published many songs and albums, available mostly in Sudan. As of 2018, Sharhabil Ahmed was still performing live at select occasions in Khartoum.

In July 2020, Habibi Funk, an independent music label based in Germany, re-edited digital versions of some of Sharhabil's songs on the album "The King Of Sudanese Jazz", with the song "Argos Farfish", amongst others, available for free listening. Reviewing this compilation in the Financial Times, music critic David Honigman described the music in the following way:

The first track, Ahmed's calling card "Argos Farfish", opens with a brutal rock riff and high bleating saxophone. Ahmed's voice comes in, urgent, imploring, exploding into a cry of "hey hey!". The drummer rolls all over the kit, like a version of "Tequila" set in the mean streets of Omdurman. The sax jostles with the vocals; the guitar flies up, high and spiky. Ahmed screams like James Brown. The rhythms stop and start, chords detonating with a flourish, before the beat jolts back into life.

== Discography ==
- The King Of Sudanese Jazz, CD by Sharhabil Ahmed, 2020

== See also ==
- Music of Sudan
- List of Sudanese singers
