= Mestaniak =

Mestaniak مستنياك

Studio album by Aziza Jalal
- Released: January 1, 1983
- Recorded: 1982
- Venues: Egypt (Cairo)
- Genres: Arabic Pop; World; Arabic music; arabic pop
- Length: 24:35
- Label: Alam El Phan
- Producer: Alam El Phan

Aziza Jalal chronology
Howa El Hobi Liaba (1982)	Mestaniak مستنياك (1983)	Haramt El Hob Alaya (1984)

Singles from Aziza Jalal
- 1. "Ghzaiel Felah" Released: February 19, 1976; 2. "Sayidi Yasid Sadati" Released: February 19, 1976; 3. "Shougl" Released: February 19, 1976; 4. "Ella Awel Ma Etkabelna" Released: July 31, 1976; 5. "Nitkabel sawa" Released: July 31, 1978

"Mestaniak" which translates to "Waiting for You" in English,(Egyptian Arabic: مستنياك; also transliterated as Mestaniyak, Ana Fi Intizarak, or إنني أنتظرك) is a popular Egyptian song by Aziza Jalal. It was released in January 1983 by Alam El Phan Records.

== Composition and legacy ==
The song "Mestaniak" is one of the most famous Arabic songs. It was sung by the iconic Moroccan singer Aziza Jalal after the release of "Howa El Hobi Liaba". It was recorded in Cairo, Egypt, in 1983, two years before the retirement of Aziza Jalal known as the Lady of Tarab or The Tarab ambassador of Arab music or the Angelic Voice of Arabic Music. At 26 years old, she retired at the height of her fame and position on the throne of Arab music in the early 1980s.

The song "Mestaniak" is written by Abdul Wahab Muhammad and composed by musician Baligh Hamdi on Maqam Rast. Maqam Rast is the main maqam in the Rast Family, and by far one of the most popular and common maqamat in the Arabic repertory. Its scale starts with the root Jins Rast on the tonic, followed on the 5th degree by either Jins Upper Rast (with its tonic up on the 8th degree) or Jins Nahawand.

The song "Mestaniak" was produced by Alam El Phan. Aziza Jalal recorded the song "Mestaniak" with Al-Firqa al-Masiya, led by the great Egyptian maestro Ahmed Fouad Hassan and under the lead of the icon Egyptian musician Baligh Hamdi.

== Music video ==
The official music video for "Mestaniak", produced by Alam El Phan, features Aziza Jalal in a studio as a singer on stage while wearing a glowing and magnificent dress robe soirée.

== Aziza Jalal's Mestaniak chart performance ==
The song "Mestaniak" remained on the top of the charts on many Arab TV and radio stations for many years. "Mestaniak" was a commercial success, topping the record charts and Alam Al Fan Company has also sold millions of copies of the song by the diva Aziza Jalal.,

== "Mestaniak" Aziza Jalal song and live performances ==
In 1985, Ms. Aziza Jalal, recorded the song "Waiting for You" during a live concert at the Zamalek Club in Cairo, Egypt, accompanied by the most famous Arab orchestra, Al-Firqa al-Masiya, led by the great Egyptian maestro and musician Ahmed Fouad Hassan.

Aziza Jalal, who has kept a low profile for more than 30 years, rekindled emotions as generations were enchanted by her voice and songs. She thanked her fans "for coming to see me after a long hiatus. I've never been away from you, you have always been in my heart. I'm back today because of your love for me. I decided to come back to participate in these joyful events in our country."

During the concert, Aziza Jalal performed "Mestaniak".

== Different versions of "Mestaniak" song ==
Many Arab artists have sung the song "Mastaniak" at their concerts and artistic gatherings.
