= A Selection of Music from Libyan Tapes =

Compilation album by Various artists
- Released: 4 July 2025
- Length: 70:40
- Label: Habibi Funk Records

A Selection of Music from Libyan Tapes is a compilation album of Libyan music from the 1980s to the early 2000s, released by Habibi Funk Records in July 2025. Habibi Funk boss Jannis Stürtz compiled the album from cassettes taken from an abandoned factory in Sousse, Tunisia. It spans several genres including reggae, synth-pop, and funk; the artists are mostly lesser-known.

== Critical reception ==
Professional ratings
Review scores
Source	Rating
Mojo	4/5 stars
Record Collector	4/5 stars
Songlines	5/5 stars

In a review for the Quietus, Bernie Brooks wrote that A Selection of Music from Libyan Tapes "plays out like an ideally sequenced mixtape from a friend trying to turn you on to something they love". Record Collector praised the album insert.

"Jani Bigool" by Khaled Al Melody is a cover of Peter Tosh's version of "Johnny B. Goode", and Francis Gooding of the Wire called it a highlight, alongside "Kul Ghrub" and "Palestine Is My Homeland". "Zannik" by Khaled Al Reigh is a cover of Pink Floyd's "Another Brick in the Wall"; Mojo called it "an incredibly ominous Arabic disco version".

== Track listing ==
No.	Title	Artist	Length
1.	"Allom"	Cheb Bakr	4:33
2.	"Irja"	Group Hewaya	4:48
3.	"Erhal Keef Alshams Tgheeb"	Shahd	5:35
4.	"Jara"	Ahmed Ben Ali	3:47
5.	"Ya Ummi"	The White Bird Band	4:25
6.	"Jani Bigool" (cover of "Johnny B. Goode")	Khaled Al Melody	4:50
7.	"Palestine Is My Homeland"	Fathi Aldiyqz & Sons of Africa Band	4:57
8.	"Kol Al Mawaeed"	Libya Music Band	3:39
9.	"Baed Al Farha"	Stars of Africa	4:47
10.	"Zannik" (cover of "Another Brick in the Wall")	Khaled Al Reigh	3:43
11.	"Jiti Yam Eloyoun Buhoor"	Khaled Al Zlitni	5:13
12.	"Hubbi Leeki"	Murad Najah	5:01
13.	"Kul Ghrub"	City Lights Band	6:06
14.	"Mawoud"	Adil Al Ramli	4:22
15.	"La Tgheeb Anni Wala Youm"	The Hope Duo	4:54
Total length:			70:40
