= Sayed Darwish (film) =

1966 film

- Directed by: Ahmed Badrakhan
- Screenplay by: Mustafa Sami; Sami Dawood.
- Story by: Mustafa Sami
- Starring: Hind Rostom Karam Motawie
- Music by: Abdel Halim Nowera
- Release date: 1966

Sayed Darwish is a 1966 biography Egyptian movie about famous and prolific Egyptian singer and composer Sayed Darwish, directed by Ahmed Badrakhan and starring Karam Motawie and Hind Rostom.

== Plot ==
The story starts with the childhood of Sayed Darwish, his youth and his approach to his aspiring career and his proven patriotism through the events of Egyptian revolution of 1919 along with his romantic relationship with belly dancer Galila. The plot may have inaccurate incidents as the life of Darwish has many unverifiable stories.

== Cast ==
- Karam Motawie: Sayed Darwish.
- Hind Rostom: Galila.
- Zizi Mustafa: Hayah.
- Hany Shaker: Young Sayed.
- Nahed Samir: Sayed's mother.
- Amin Elheneidy: Abbas.
- Adel Imam: Galila's assistant.
- Mohammed Shawki: Mahrous.
- Edmond Tuema: Michian.
- Gamil Ezz Eldin.
- Hassan Abdul Salam.
- Shraf Al-Selehdar.
- Fatheia Shahin.
- Esmat Abdelalim.
- Fattoh Nashaty.
- Layla Yousry.
- Hussein Ismail.
- Hussein Asar.
- Samiha Mohamed.
- Fatheia Shahin.
- Adib El Tarabolsy.
