= Habibi Funk Records =

German Arabic-music reissue record label

- Founder: Jannis Stürtz (co-founder)
- Country of origin: Germany
- Location: Berlin
- Official website: habibifunkrecords.bandcamp.com

Habibi Funk Records is a reissue record label based in Berlin, Germany dedicated to music from the Arab world. It was co-founded by Jannis Stürtz, who also works as a DJ using the name Habibi Funk. The label is mostly known for its albums and accompanying booklets of Arabic funk and soul bands from the 1960-80s.

== History ==
Jannis Stürtz first became interested in the music of the region while visiting Casablanca, Morocco in 2012. Habibi Funk's first release was al-Zman Saib (الزمان صعيب), a 1970s reinterpretation of British rock group Free's song "All Right Now" by a Moroccan group called Fadaul et les Privileges (فضول).

Habibi Funk has re-released an expansive collection of Arabic funk and soul bands from the 1960-80s, including compilations. Apart from these, there are albums featuring a specific band, like Sudanese funk musician Kamal Keila, the "King of Sudanese Jazz", Sharhabil Ahmed or The Scorpions and Saif Abu Bakr, as well as North African musicians such as Al Massrieen, Ahmed Malek, Raze de Soare, Mallek Mohamed, and Hamid El Shaeri.

== Cultural politics and licensing ==
In an interview with The Vinyl Factory, Stürtz commented: "If you’re a European or Western label and you’re dealing with non-European artists’ music, there’s obviously a special responsibility to make sure you don’t reproduce historic economic patterns of exploitation, which is the number one thing when it comes to the post-colonial aspect of what we are doing." Stürtz has emphasised the importance of avoiding orientalist "stereotypical visual language." Stürtz has said that Habibi Funk Records licenses the music it reissues directly from the artists or their families, who get a 50% cut of the profits.

== Discography ==
Adapted from the label's website. Music recorded at an earlier date but previously unreleased is denoted with "archival".

Cat. No.	Artist	Title	Type	Country	Original Release Year	Reissue Year
001	Dalton	"Alech"	Reissue single	Tunisia	1971/2	2015
002	Fadoul	Al Zman Saib	Compilation album	Morocco	—N/a	2015
003	Ahmed Malek	Musique Originale De Films	Reissue album	Algeria	1978	2016
004	Carthago	"Alech"	Reissue single	Tunisia	1979	2016
005	Ahmed Malek & Flako	The Electronic Tapes	Album	Algeria / Germany	—N/a	2017
006	Al Massrieen	Modern Music	Compilation album	Egypt	—N/a	2017
007	—N/a	An Eclectic Selection of Music from the Arab World	Various artists compilation album	—N/a	—N/a	2017
008	Kamal Keila	Muslims and Christians	Archival album	Sudan	—N/a	2018
009	The Scorpions & Saif Abu Bakr	Jazz, Jazz, Jazz	Reissue album	Sudan	1980	2018
010	Issam Hajali	Mouasalat Ila Jacad El Ard	Reissue album	Lebanon	1977	2019
011	Attarazat Addahabia & Faradjallah	Al Hadaoui	Archival album	Morocco	—N/a	2019
012	Ahmed Ben Ali	"Subhana"	Archival single	Libya	—N/a	2020
013	Sharhabil Ahmed	The King Of Sudanese Jazz	Compilation album	Sudan	—N/a	2020
014	—N/a	Solidarity With Beirut	Various artists compilation album	—N/a	—N/a	2020
015	—N/a	An Eclectic Selection of Music from the Arab World, Part 2	Various artists compilation album	—N/a	—N/a	2021
016	Rogér Fakhr	Fine Anyway	Reissue album	Lebanon	1977	2021
017	Majid Soula	Chant Amazigh	Compilation album	Algeria	—N/a	2021
018	Hamid El Shaeri	The SLAM! Years (1983 - 1988)	Compilation album	Egypt	—N/a	2022
019	Ferkat Al Ard	Oghneya	Reissue album	Lebanon	1978	2022
020	Maha	Orkos	Reissue album	Egypt	1979	2022
021	The Free Music	Free Music (Part 1)	Compilation album	Libya	—N/a	2023
022	Ahmed Ben Ali	Subhana	Archival album	Libya	—N/a	2023
023	Charif Megarbane	Marzipan	Album	Lebanon	—N/a	2023
024	Ibrahim Hesnawi	The Father of Libyan Reggae	Compilation album	Libya	—N/a	2023
025	Rogér Fakhr	East of Any Place	Archival album	Lebanon	—N/a	2023
026	—N/a	Solidarity with Libya	Various artists compilation album	—N/a	—N/a	2023
027	Ahmed Malek	Musique Originale De Films (Volume 2)	Reissue album	Algeria	1978	2024
028	Ahmed Malek	Musique Originale De Films (Volume 3)	Reissue album	Algeria	1978	2024
029	Cheb Bakr	Samh Almea'ad	Single	Libya	—N/a	2024
030	Charif Megarbane	Hawalat	Album	Lebanon	—N/a	2025
031	—N/a	A Selection of Music from Libyan Tapes	Various artists compilation album	Libya	—N/a	2025

== See also ==
- Music of Sudan
- Music of Morocco
