= Seret El Hob =

1964 song by Umm Kulthum

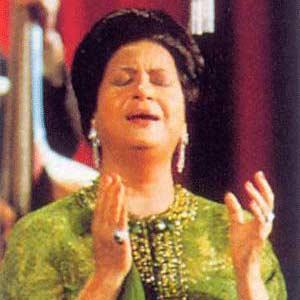
Umm Kulthum singing on a stage, 1965.

Seret El Hob (Arabic: سيرة الحب, lit. 'The Tale of Love') is an Egyptian Arabic song performed by the Egyptian singer Umm Kulthum. The song was written by Morsi Gamil, and composed by Baligh Hamdi. It was released in 1964, and it remains one of Umm Kulthum's most celebrated and iconic works.

It was presented for the first time on December 3, 1964, at the Qasr El Nil Theater. It is considered the first collaboration between Umm Kulthum, Morsi Gamil, and Baligh Hamdi them after agreeing on three songs (Seret El Hob, Fat El Ma'ad, and Alf Leila Wa Leila).

== Composition ==
"Seret Al-Hob" was composed by the prominent Egyptian composer Baligh Hamdi, with lyrics written by the Egyptian poet and lyricist Morsi Gamil. The first songs of Mursi Gamal Aziz with the Star of the East were initially met with some apprehension from Aziz, who was initially hesitant to work with Umm Kulthum. However, after several sessions with her, he agreed. He provided her with three openings for the trilogy "Seret El Hob," "Fat El Ma'ad," and "Alf Leila Wa Leila" (One Thousand and One Nights). It was initially intended to be composed by Mohamed Al-Mougy, but after some issues, it was composed by Baligh Hamdi. Baligh, renowned for his innovative contributions to Arabic music, employed a mix of traditional Arabic instruments and orchestral arrangements to create a rich and immersive soundscape. The composition features a blend of classical and modern elements, which was characteristic of Hamdi's style during this period.

Regarding the song: It is considered one of the most important romantic songs performed by the Lady of Arabic Singing. There are specific sections of the song that the audience still repeats to this day. Poet Salah Jahin commented on it in one of his interviews, saying: "Seret Al-Hob is the teenage daughter of the song 'Inta Omri' written by Ahmed Shafiq Kamel and composed by Mohammed Abdel Wahab."

=== Lyrics ===
The lyrics of "Seret Al-Hob" explore the profound experiences and emotions associated with love. The title itself, which translates to "The Tale of Love," reflects the narrative quality of the song. The song's verses describe the various facets of love, from its initial enchantment to the enduring commitment that follows. The poetic nature of the lyrics, combined with Umm Kulthum's expressive vocal delivery, contributes to the song's emotional impact.

== Concerts ==
This is a list of Umm Kulthum's performances of the song:

- Qasr El-Nil - December 3, 1964
- Azbakeya Garden - January 7, 1965
- Cairo University - January 25, 1965
- Azbakeya Garden - February 4, 1965
- Azbakeya Garden - May 6, 1965
- Qasr El-Nil - May 3, 1965
- Bisan Al-Alya - August 8, 1965
- Azbakeya Garden - February 3, 1966
- Baalbeck International Festival (Baalbek Theater) - July 17, 1966
