= Attarazat Addahabia =

Moroccan band

Attarazat Addahabia (Arabic: الترزات الذهبية) was a band founded in 1968 by Abdelakabir Faradjallah in Casablanca, Morocco. Abdelakabir Faradjallah led the band, which was made up of members of three generations of his family.

== Al Hadaoui ==
In 1972, Attarazat Addahabia recorded an album entitled Al Hadaoui (الهداوي) at the Boussiphone studio. However, this recording was not released until Habibi Funk released it on July 12, 2019. The Nation described the album as combining "the grit of ’70s American funk with the festive sound of Gnawa."
