= Mouasalat Ila Jacad El Ard =

- 2019 reissue cover

Studio album by Issam Hajali
- Released: 1977; reissued in 2019
- Recorded: May to June 1977, Paris
- Label: Self-released; Habibi Funk (010)

Mouasalat Ila Jacad El Ard (transl. Journey to the Heart of the World) is the debut studio album by Lebanese musician Issam Hajali. Originally self-released in 1977 to relative obscurity, it was reissued by Habibi Funk Records on November 22, 2019. Hajali fled his home after the Syrian intervention in the Lebanese Civil War. He spent a year in Paris in exile, living in an immigrant community, and forming a band. Hajali could only afford a day of studio time. He recorded the album in May or June 1977, with each track recorded in one take. Less than 100 cassette tapes were made and Hajali self-released the album in Beirut. The album had many political themes and was influenced by the persecution of Palestinian activists and the poetry of Samih al-Qasim.

== Background and recording ==
“It was very, very hard [...] Paris is very difficult for immigrants. It was a strange new environment…it’s very hard to adapt."

— Hajali, in an phone call with Bandcamp Daily

After the Syrian intervention in the Lebanese Civil War, Issam Hajali fled his home due to his activity in left-wing politics and the Palestine Liberation Organisation. He subsequently spent a year in Paris, working odd jobs, and living in an immigrant community which ended up having many musicians. There, he formed a band with members from France, Algeria, and Beirut, one of whom was Roger Fakhr. Only being able to afford one day in the studio in Paris, Hajali finished the project in Beirut on his return in late 1977. Each of the seven tracks were recorded in one take, then overdubbed with the santur. This Paris session took place around May or June 1977.

== Release ==
Due to the political conflict still present in Beirut, the music scene had dwindled. So, he self-released the album in 1977 onto cassette tape, and he estimates that less than 100 black-and-white tapes were produced. Hajali sold the tapes to family and friends and local stores on consignment. In 2016, Habibi Funk-owner Jannis Stürtz tracked down Hajali. This led to the label reissuing the album on November 22, 2019, using the only tape Hajali had retained. It was released on vinyl and CD.

== Themes and music ==
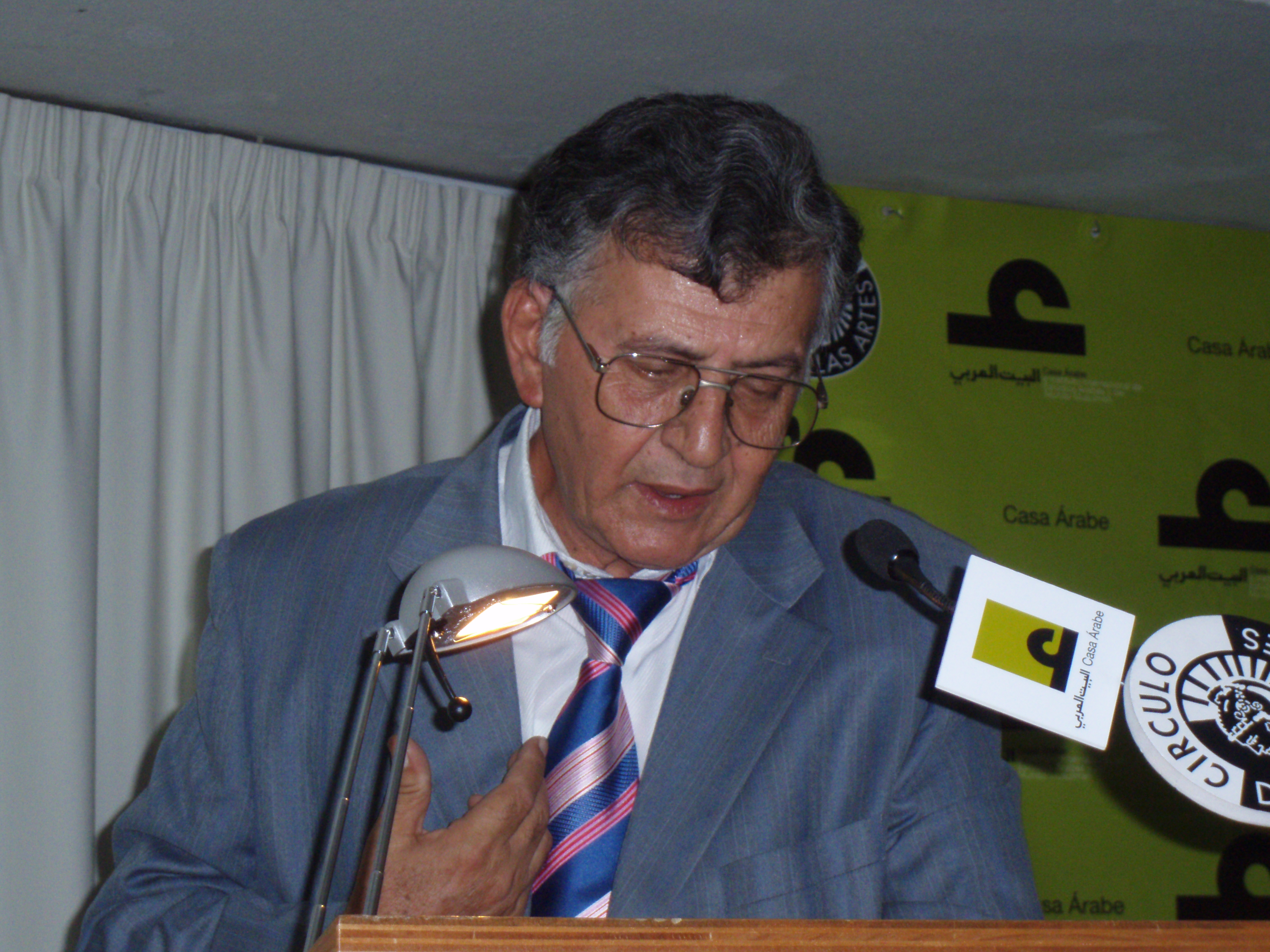
Palestinian poet Samih al-Qasim in 2007, who was a big inspiration for the album's lyrics

Mouasalat Ila Jacad El Ard (translated as "Journey to Another World") had many political themes and was described by Far Out as a "political statement". The word مواصلات (mouasalat) has multiple, complex meanings: according to Hajali, it can entail transportation, communication, or a physical and emotional connection. The album was influenced by the persecution of Palestinian activists in Lebanon. Hajali's lyrics were heavily inspired by the poetry of Samih al-Qasim. According to The Guardian influence from Minnie Riperton and Nick Drake can be heard in the tracks "Mouasalat Ila Jacad El Ard" and "Khobs" respectively.

Hajali living in Paris in exile due to a war caused him to view his heritage differently and question himself. He describes, "It made me look at my roots in a different way. I started looking to traditional music, trying to understand more. I started remembering—and this made a rebirth.”

== Legacy ==
The album remained in relative obscurity until its reissue in 2019. According to Bandcamp Daily, the album "contained the seeds" for Ferkat Al Ard, a band that Hajali would later form, achieving wider success. After Ziad Rahbani listened to one of the self-released tapes, he was inspired and Rahbani would later work with Hajali in Ferkat Al Ard.

== Track listing ==
1. "Ana Damir El Motakallim" — 11:42
2. "Mouasalat Ila Jacad El Ard" — 3:27
3. "Khobs" — 3:31
4. "Lam Azal" — 3:36
5. "Ada" — 4:58
6. "Yawma Konna" — 4:34
7. "Intazirne" — 3:13
