= El-Ouyoun El-Soud =

1972 song

El-Ouyoun El-Soud (Egyptian Arabic: العيون السود, lit. 'The Black Eyes'), alternatively titled "What Did the Years Do to Us" , also known as "Amalet eih fina el-sinin" (Egyptian Arabic: عملت ايه فينا السنين), is a 1972 song performed by Warda Al-Jazairia, with lyrics by Mohamed Hamza and music by Baligh Hamdi. It was popularized by Warda on release, and is often cited as one of her signature songs. Media coverage of Warda's artistic career links the song to her relationship with Baligh Hamdi before her marriage to Algerian officer Jamal Qaseeri. The work is frequently discussed in that biographical context.

The song appears on screen in the film "Sound of Love" (1973), in which Warda performs it against the backdrop of the Acropolis in Athens, Greece. Music critic Sherif Hassan describes the melody as melancholic and the lyrics as poetic. He argued that Hamdi's composition and Hamza's verses suit Warda's vocal style.

== Song's narrative ==
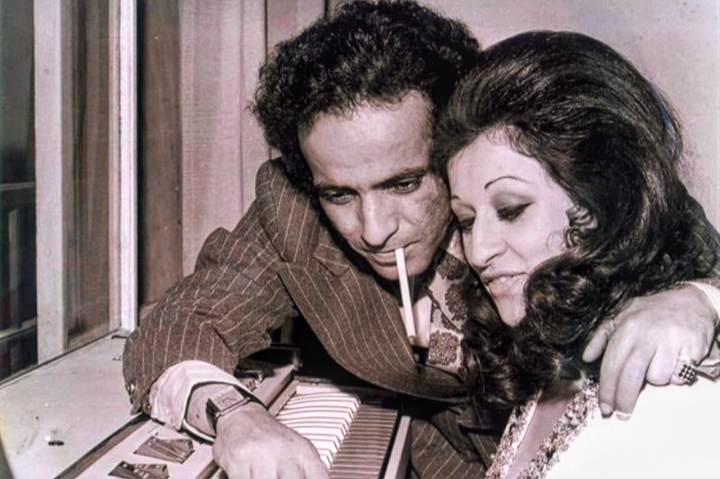
Baligh Hamdi and Warda got married in 1972.

Warda Al-Jazairia's interest in Baligh Hamdi's music is said to have begun after she saw his work in the film Alwisada El Khalia (The Empty Pillow) (1957), and although they lived in different countries she sought to meet him. They met when she was invited to Egypt to appear in El Maz wa Abdu El Hamouly (1962), after which a relationship developed despite family objections, while Warda later married in Algeria and retired from singing.

Several accounts link the creation of "El-Ouyoun El-Soud" to a period when the two were apart: Hamdi composed the music with lyrics by Mohamed Hamza, and sources read the text in light of Warda's marriage to the Algerian officer Jamal Qaseeri and her hiatus from performance. After Warda's withdrawal from performing, Algerian President Houari Boumédiène invited Egyptian artists, including Warda, to Independence Day celebrations and encouraged her to sing for the army and the revolution with Hamdi composing; during this period he wrote "El-Ouyoun El-Soud" on the oud. Warda subsequently relocated to Cairo and resumed work with Hamdi, and some sources note affectionate phrases associated with the song, including Hamdi’s reference to Warda as "the mother of black eyes" and Warda's line "the black eyes love you".

== Legal controversy ==
A legal conflict emerged between Baligh Hamdi and singer Najat Al Saghira led to the song's broadcast being temporarily halted. The two parties later reached a settlement, and broadcasting resumed.

== Influence and legacy ==
Warda's return to Egypt marked a new phase in her artistic career, as she resumed singing and collaborated again with Baligh Hamdi. Their return included concerts such as City Lights, in which Warda performed "El-Ouyoun El-Soud".

Their collaboration is a recurring topic in discussions of "El-Ouyoun El-Soud". Numerous artists have performed the song, including Sherine, Fadel Chaker, Mai Farouk, Nancy Ajram, Wael Jassar, Mohammed Assaf, and others.
