= Hany Shaker =

Egyptian singer, actor and composer (1952–2026)

Hany Shaker هاني شاكر
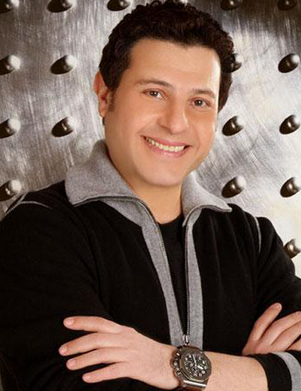

Background information
- Born: Hany Abdel Aziz Shaker; 21 December 1952; Cairo, Kingdom of Egypt
- Died: 3 May 2026 (aged 73) Paris, France
- Occupations: Singer; composer; actor
- Years active: 1970–2026

Hany Abdel Aziz Shaker (Arabic: هاني عبد العزيز شاكر, IPA: [ˈhæːni ˈʃæːkeɾ]; 21 December 1952 – 3 May 2026) was an Egyptian singer, actor and composer. His first public appearance was when he sang with Abd El Halim Hafez Choral Group in "Sora", then he played the young Sayed Darwish in the movie Sayed Darwish.

== Life and career ==
Hany Shaker began his musical career at a very early age – learning the piano as a child, when his mother took on the role of agent as well as supervisor of his professional training. After graduation from high school in the early 1970s, he studied music at the prestigious Cairo Conservatoire.

Shaker scored his first breakthrough hit in his second year of college in December 1972 with a song written by Mohammed El Mougi, "Heloua ya Dounia" (It's a Wonderful Life), which set him off on his musical career. Although at that time the biggest legends remained at their peak – Umm Kulthum, Farid al-Atrash, Mohammed Abdel Wahab and Abdel Halim Hafez – they recognized his potential and supported him, so that he was able to become known among all these legends. Hany claimed he owed his greatest musical debt to Abdel Halim Hafez, a man who continues to exert a huge influence on younger Egyptian and Arab musicians even after his death in 1977.

In 1974, Shaker was invited to participate in a concert in Lebanon, which turned out to be a huge success. Since then, Shaker has remained extremely popular among the Lebanese.

From then on Shaker produced a number of his early hits: "Siboni Aheb" (Let me love), "Kisma w’nasib" (Destiny and fate), and one of his most popular "Kida Bardo Ya Amar" (It's not fair, oh Moon"). During the 1970s Shaker presented two famous plays, "Cinderella" and "Egypt", and three romantic movies: When Love Sings, We Live for Love, and I Love This and Want That.

In the course of his long career, Shaker proved he was not only a talented singer, but also a songwriter of his own material, including the album Albi Maloh, which included eight hits in the early 1990s, and songs such as "Ma’ak" and "Katabetli essenin", as well as working with composers including Salah El Sharnoubi, Tarik Akif, Yehia El Mougi, Mohamed Sultan, Baligh Hamdi, Mohamed Elmogi, khaled Elamir, Mounir Mourad, Elias El Rahbani, Ammar Elshereei, Mohamed Diaa Eldeen, Sami Elhefnawi, Hassan Abo Elsuood, and Ahmed Shata.

In spite of his love of traditional Egyptian music, Shaker also enjoyed modern songs which reflect contemporary society. He considered his own musical style a halfway point between tradition and modernity. In the late 1980s and the 1990s he started to act through his video clips, including Lao Ya’ni, Nesyanak Sa’b, Mat Hadidish, Albi Maloh and many others.

Shaker died in Paris on 3 May 2026, at the age of 73.
