= Zakia Abu Gassim Abu Bakr =

Sudanese guitarist (born 1930s)

Zakia Abu Gassim Abu Bakr, Zakia Abdul Gassim Abu Bakr or Zakia Abulqasim (Arabic: زكية أبوالقاسم أبوبكر; born 1930s) is a Sudanese guitarist. She started performing in the 1960s and is recognised as Sudan's first female professional guitarist. As of 2018, aged in her 80s, she was still leading an all-woman traditional Sudanese music group, Sawa Sawa.

== Early life ==
She was born in Abbasiya, Omdurman, Sudan. She did not complete her secondary education, but taught for four years at the Fella Gerges School and studied courses provided by the Sudanese Red Crescent, and literacy course arranged by the municipal council.

== Musical career ==
She learned to play first the flute, then the oud, and then the guitar. In the 1960s the jazz musician Sharhabil Ahmed, who she subsequently married, invited her to join his band. She played in traditional Sudanese dress.

In the 1980s the couple moved to Cairo, Egypt, to benefit their children's education: all seven children grew to be artists and musicians. During their time in Cairo they performed at Cairo Opera House and at the Roman theatre in Alexandria, and toured to festivals in places including Asmara, Berlin, London, Paris and the Netherlands.

She has said that before late 1980s and the start of the Omar Al Bashir regime, the government of supported cultural festivals: "The Ministry of Culture was not stingy in carrying folk and artistic groups on a full plane in which all races were represented, but now it is not interested in developing arts and does not recognise or evaluate the artistic wealth of its country."

She formed the band Sawa Sawa as a women's group, and as of 2021 was working on the band's first album, which was to include three instrumentals and three songs with poetry, all written by Zakia.

== Personal life ==
She is married to Sudanese musician Sharhabil Ahmed (born 1935), with whom she performed from the 1960s to the 1980s.
