= Aziza Jalal =

Moroccan singer and actress (born 1958)

Aziza Jalal عزيزة جلال
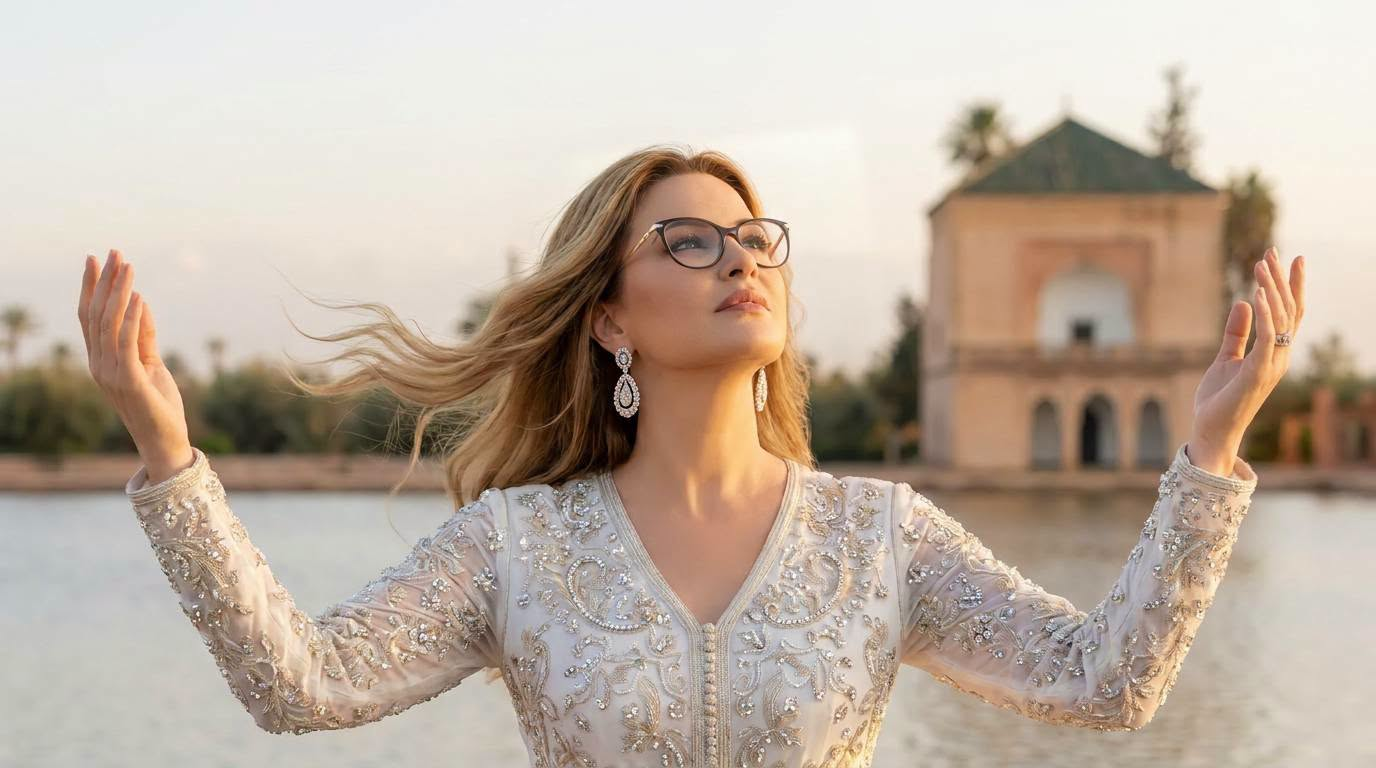
- Aziza Jalal

Background information
- Born: Aziza Jalal; 15 December 1958 (age 67); Meknès, Morocco
- Genres: Classical Arabic; Egyptian pop
- Occupations: Actress; singer; record producer
- Years active: 1975–1985; 2019–present
- Labels: Mazzika; Alam El Phan; Sout El-Hob; Sawt El Phan

Aziza Jalal (Arabic: عزيزة جلال; born 15 December 1958) is a Moroccan Arab pop singer and actress.

== Career ==
Aziza Jalal was born in Meknès, Morocco. She later moved to Saudi Arabia and became a Saudi national. Before fame and marriage, the singer dedicated her life to the study of music. In her youth, she studied music in Meknes before participating in a singing competition called Mawahib (Talents) supervised by Moroccan singer Abdelnabi Al Jirari in 1975. During the competition, the singer performed songs of well-known Egyptian and other Arab singers, such as Shadia and Ismahan.

In her singing career that lasted from 1975 to 1985, Jalal became a popular singer across the Arab world before deciding to give up the artistic scene for a life of piety with her Saudi husband. She was known as King Hassan II of Morocco's favourite singer, often appeared on Moroccan television and at state occasions singing nationalistic, pan-Arab, and Islamic-themed music.

The singer had made a name for herself as one of the top Arab singers in the 70s and 80s. Some time laater, her vocals made headlines again as she astonished the world by singing a few verses from her song during a television show. Jalal’s song Mestaniak was covered by Lebanese singer Nancy Ajram. The song’s lyrics come from the repertoire of the great Egyptian musician Mohammed Abdel Wahab. The composer of the song was the renowned musician Baligh Hamdi.

The song Mestaniak remained on top of the charts at many Arab TV and radio stations for years. It was a commercial success, and sold millions of copies.

Aziza Jalal had several other famous songs, including Min Hakek T’atebny (You have the right to blame me,) and Houa El Hob La'baa (Love is a Game.)

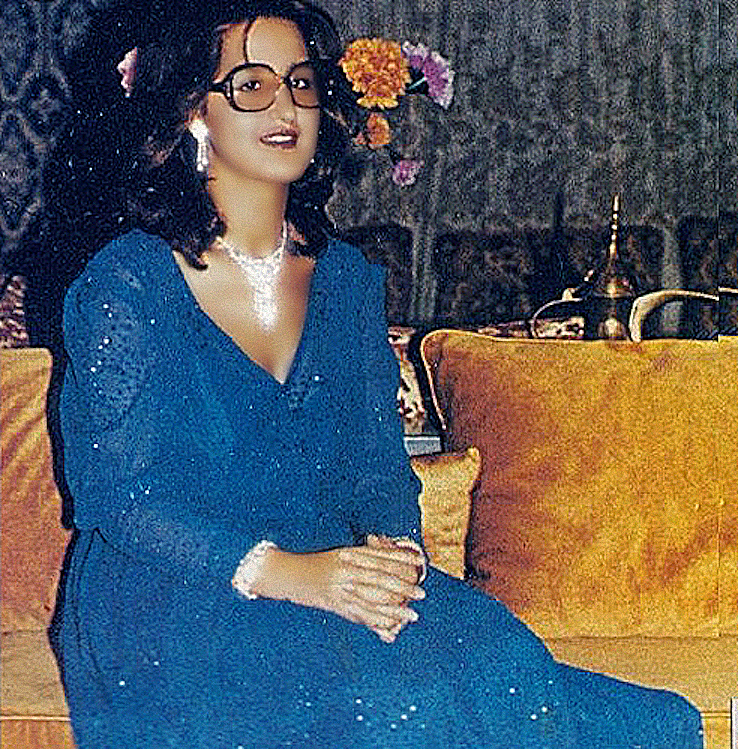
Arabic pop singer Aziza Jalal attending a wedding event

== Retired at 26 ==
In 1985, Aziza Jalal chose to leave the stage. She married the Saudi businessman Ali bin Butti al-Ghamdi who gave her the right to decide whether or not she wanted to retire. She didn't think much into it and decided to leave. She stated that it wasn't a decision she regrets. The proposal suddenly ended her career in the music industry, leaving her fans disappointed, knowing that she could have added even more hits to her already impressive list of songs.

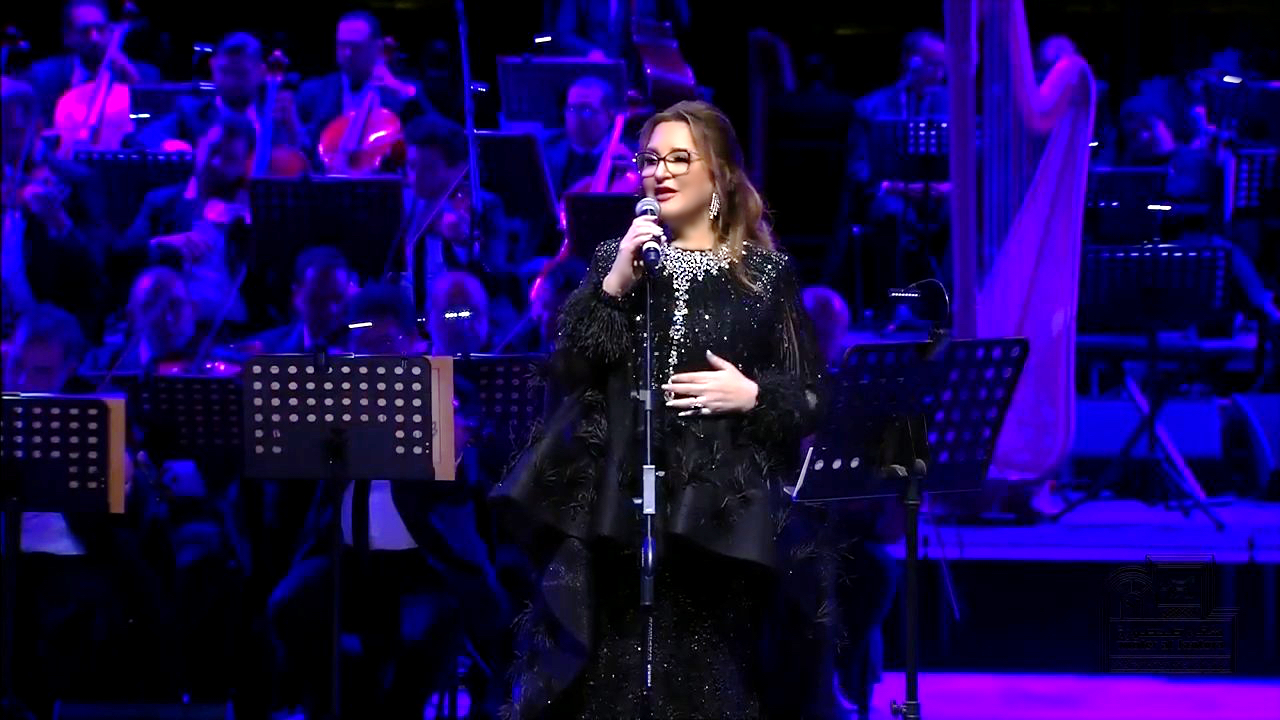
Arabic pop singer Aziza Jalal performing at Winter at Tantora Festival

== Returned to stage 2019 ==
May 22, 2019 marked a surprise for the Arab World. It was the day that Moroccans and fans across the Arab world had the chance to meet again with the prominent Moroccan arabic singer, Aziza Jalal, who was out of the spotlight for 34 years. The singer made her first appearance since 1985 on a television show aired by MBC television channel. The TV show is called “Likaa mina sifr” or “meeting from scratch.”

In the show, the singer also wowed audiences across the world when she performed her legendary song “Mestanyak,” translated as “I am waiting for you” in English, with the same passion and maybe a little bit more.

The interview with Aziza Jalal was also posted by the television show on YouTube. The interview generated more than 1 million views and thousand of comments.

After a 34-year hiatus, Jalal returned to the stage on Thursday 26 December 2019 at Winter at Tantora. Her performance started at 10 p.m. Aziza Jalal, who had kept a low profile for more than 30 years, was well-received by the crowd. She thanked her fans “for coming to see me after a long hiatus. I’ve never been away from you, you have always been in my heart. I'm back today because of your love for me. I decided to come back to participate in these joyful events in our country.”

During the concert, Aziza Jalal performed “Love is not a game” composed by Muhammad Al-Mouji and written by Mamoun Al-Shinawai, and "Waiting for you (Mestaniyak) which the audience enjoyed immensely. She also performed many of her classics. Her message to the youth was: “Hear us out because we are the past, and the past needs the present and the future, hear us out so that we hear you out.”.

== Discography ==
=== Studio albums ===
The album cover for Mestaniak. (Egyptian Arabic: مستنياك; also transliterated as Mestaniyak, Ana Fi Intizarak, or Waiting for you)

Song	الأغاني
Halakti Ayouni Hna W Hnak	حلقت عيوني هنا وهناك
Ahila Al Maghreb	عاهل المغرب
Batala Al Qodss	بطل القدس
Ya Laylo Toul	ياليـل طول
Al Aido Ada	العيد عاد
Annouro Mawsolo	النور موصول
Yorani Liarchika	يغن لعرشك
Min Koli Dakit Alb	من كل دقة قلب
Sayidi Ya Sid Sadati	سيدي ياسيد ساداتي
Gazayil Follah	غزيل فله
Ya Shoue	ياشوق هزني هوى الشوق
Ella Aweel Matkabilna	إلا أول ماتقابلنا
Howa El Hobi Liaba	هو الحب لعبه
Waltakayna	والتقينا
Zayi Manta	زي مانت
Minak Wi Eleek	منك واليك
Mestaniak	مستنياك
Min Haak Tiatibni	من حقك تعاتبني
Haramti El Hob	حرمت الحب عليه
Rouhi Feek	روحي فيك
Azzamzamiya	قصيدة الزمزمية
Mawlay	مولاي
Ghali Ya Hassan	غال ياحسن
Inta Omri	إنت عمري
Arouh Limin	أروح لمين
Al Atlal	الأطلال
Layali El Onss	ليالي الأنس
Youmi El Massira	ِمِن يِنسى يوم المسيرة
Al Maghreb Aghla Manar	المغرب أغلى منار
Official song of the Pan Arab Games 1985	1985 الأغنية الرسمية لإفتتاح الألعاب العربية
Man Ana	من أنا؟
Ash Salman	عاش سلمان
RAFRAFA ELGALB	رَفرَف القلب
