= Baligh Hamdi =

Egyptian composer (1931–1993)

Baligh Hamdi بليغ حمدي
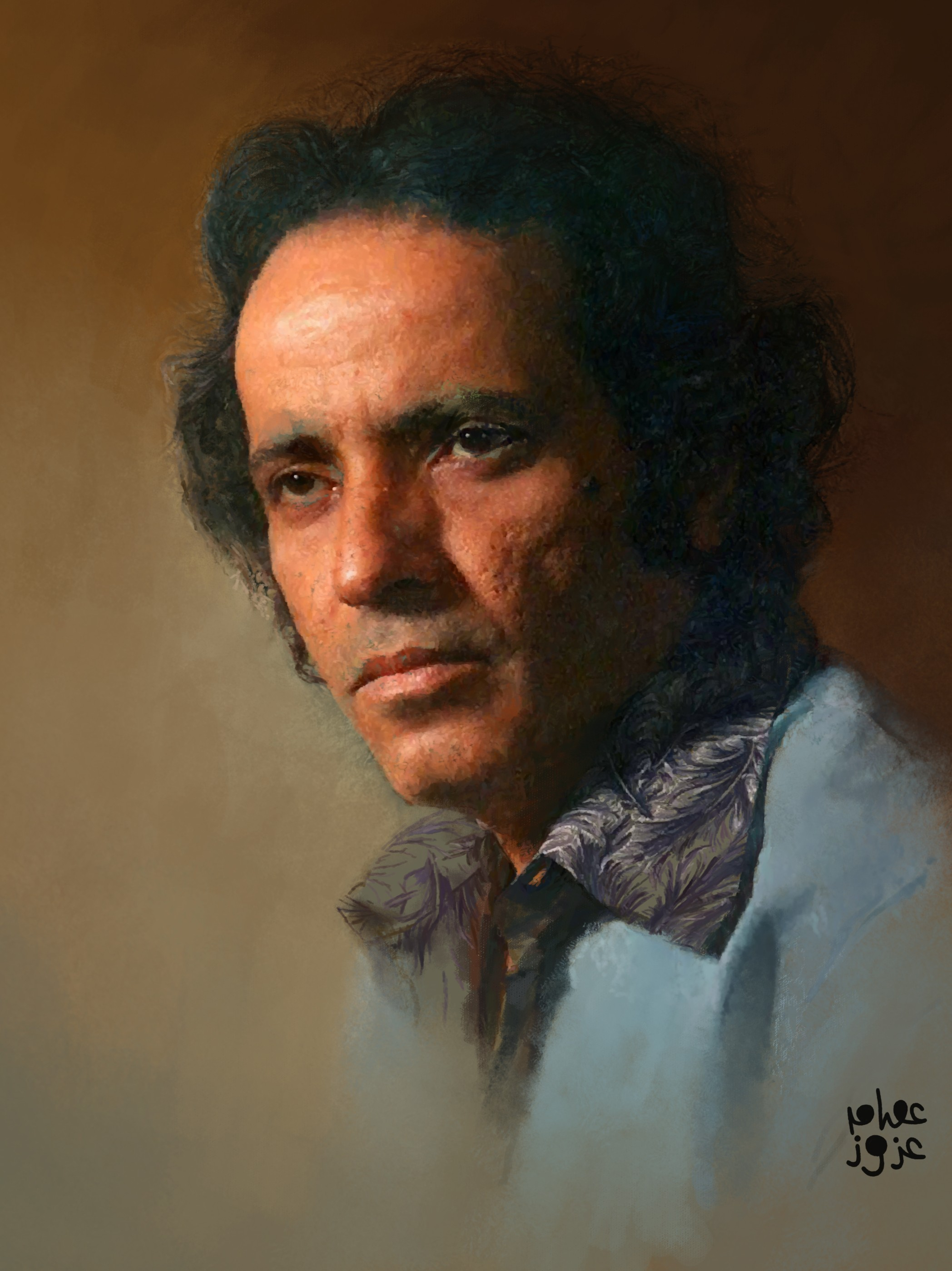

Background information
- Born: 7 October 1931; Cairo, Egypt
- Died: 12 September 1993 (aged 61) Paris, France
- Occupation: Composer
- Spouse: Warda Al-Jazairia

Baligh Hamdi (Arabic: بليغ حمدي [bæˈliːɣ ˈħæmdi]; 7 October 1931 – 12 September 1993) was an Egyptian composer who created and composed many hit songs for several singers in the Arab world, especially during the 1960s and 1970s. He composed Warda's most famous songs, and the two got married for a long period.

== Early years ==
Baligh Abdel Hamid Hamdi Morsi was born on 7 October 1931 in the Shubra district of Cairo. His father was a professor of physics at King Fuad I University (now Cairo University). He learned to play the violin at age nine, and the oud two or three years later. He took music lessons with a variety of teachers throughout childhood and teenage years. He became a professional musician in 1954 at age 22. Immediately prior to that, he had been a law student, and he chose to not complete the studies for the law degree.

He started his musician career as singer. But very soon he turned to composing, and his compositions got good acceptance in the mid-1950s. In the late 1950s, the then-famous Umm Kulthum sang his composition "Hob Eih" and it was a hit. Some other of Baligh Hamdi's early compositional successes include "Why no", sung by Faydah Kamel, the song "Ma Tehbneesh Be El Shakl Da (Don't love me like that)" performed by Fayza Ahmed, and the song "Tkhounoh ([How do you] Betray [my heart])" by Abdel Halim Hafez. For the next two decades he was by far one of the most popular, successful, and productive composers not only in Egypt but within the entire region. His fame and legacy stay very strong in his native Egypt till this day.

== Egyptian Folk Inspiration ==
Baligh Hamdi frequently said that he drew upon musical ideas and aesthetics in Egyptian folk melodies and rhythms in composing his songs. His sound has a classical flavor due to the heavy use of the string orchestra. But he also made some use of electronic keyboards and guitars in harmony with the strings, or alternating with the strings, in many songs.

His best work is published as recordings under the name of the singer. The singers include Umm Kulthum, Abdel Halim Hafez, Shadia, Layla Murad, Najat Al Saghira, Fayza Ahmed, Warda (whom he was married to for a decade), Sabah, and other singers. He had also collaborated with the singer Aziza Jalal who promoted her songs Mestaniak and Haramt El Hob Alaya

Not to mention his precious contribution in soundtracks of feature films including the award winning film; A Taste of Fear (1969), which was listed in the CIFF Top hundred Egyptian films.

== Songs composed ==
- Khosara Khosara, words written by Mamoun Shanawi (1957)
- Hob Ayeh, words written by Abdul Wahab Mohammed (1960)
- Ansak Ya Salam, words written by Mamoun Shanawi (1961)
- Zalamna El Hob, words written by Abdul Wahab Mohammed (1961)
- Seret El Hob, words written by Morsy Gameel Aziz (1964)
- Kol Lilah We Kol Youm, words written by Mamoun Shanawi (1964)
- Rise people and the spirit and conscience, words written by Abdul Wahab Mohammed (1962)
- the transfer of the Nile, words written by Abdul Wahab Mohammed (1962)
- Bied Anak, words written by Mamoun Shanawi (1965)
- Ena Fedayeen, words written by Abdel Fattah Mustafa (1967)
- Ana we Enta zalamna el Hobb words my Abdel Wahab Mohamed
- Fat El Ma'ad, words written by Morsy Gameel Aziz (1967)
- Alf Leilah Wa Leilah, words written by Morsy Gameel Aziz (1969)
- El Hob Kolloh, words written by Ahmed Shafiq Kamel (1970)
- El-Ouyoun El-Soud, with Mohamed Hamza (1972)
- Hakam Alina El Howa, words written by Abdel Wahab Mohamed (1973)

Presented to Abdel Halim Hafez what is considered to be some of the finest music since the end of the 1900s (Gana El Howa/ El Toba / Mououd / Sawah / Tkhounoh / Habibaty Man Takon / Maddah El Kamar / Zay El Howa / Hawel Teftikerni / Ay demat Hozn / Ada El Nahar / Fedai / Ash Elly Kal).

Presented to singer Warda Al-Jazairia, including the Ghent (Khaleek Hena / Low Salok / Black Eyes / Mali / Dandanah / Ashtrony / Hekaity ma el zaman).

Baligh Hamdi has contributed in the development and revival of the musical theater provided most of the work: Operetta "Egypt Bride," and the operetta "Tmarahnp", "Yassin, I have," also wrote several songs, including: (Love that was - I Bahqk of Mayada Al Henawy), and "Bawadaak" rose to as defined by discovering many of the singers and the singers, especially from Arab countries.

Hamdi eloquent cooperation with Abdel Rahman el-Abnudi and Mohamed Rushdie introduced in the early sixties with all types of Egyptian folklore providing a set number of songs together, including (Adaweya / Baladiat / Wasai Llnoor), also providing to Mohammed Rushdie others (METI Ashofak/Ala el Ramla / Moghram Sabiah/ Tayer Ya-hwa).

== Film scores ==
=== Film ===
- A Taste of Fear
- Sons of Silence
- Roadless Traveller
- Old Time
- Ah Ya Leil Ya Zaman
- City Lights

=== Television ===
- Mouths and Rabbits
- RIA and Sekina
- Almedk Alley
- Halawani Gate

== Jay-Z's unauthorized use of Khosara Khosara ==
Baligh Hamdy's heir claimed that Jay-Z, an American rapper, used the melody from Khosara Khosara in his 2000s hit Big Pimpin'. On 30 March 2015, a judge in California set the issue for trial. But on 21 October 2015 US district judge Christina Snyder abruptly dismissed the lawsuit against Jay Z and his producer Timbaland before it went to a jury, ruling that the heir of an Egyptian composer lacked the right to pursue a copyright infringement claim.
