= Mohamed Fouad =

Egyptian singer, actor and songwriter

- Also known as: Egypt's Voice (Soot Masr), Fo2sh
- Born: Mohamed Fouad Abdel Hamid Hassan محمد فؤاد عبد الحميد حسن; December 20, 1961 (age 64)
- Origin: Ismailia, Egypt
- Genres: Mediterranean, Egyptian Music
- Occupations: Singer; composer; actor; writer
- Instrument: Vocal
- Years active: 1982–present
- Labels: High Fidelity, Rotana

Mohamed Fouad Abd El Hamid Hassan (Arabic: محمد فؤاد عبد الحميد حسن; born December 20, 1961) is an Egyptian singer, actor and songwriter.

== Career ==
Fouad's career in music and film peaked in the 1990s, and he continued to release songs and movies later into the 2020s. He filmed his first television series "Agla Min Hayaty" in 2010, and hosted the television show "Khush Ala Fo’sh" in 2014.

== Discography ==
- Fel Sekka (1985)
- Khefet Dammo (1986)
- Hawed (1987)
- Yani (1988)
- Es'aly (1990)
- Mesheena (1992)
- Habina (1993)
- Nehlam (1994)
- Hayran (1996)
- Kamanana (1997)
- El-Hob El-Haqiqy (1998)
- Albi We Rouhi We Omri (1999)
- El-Alb El-Tayeb (2000)
- Keber El-Gharam (2001)
- Rehlet Hob (2001)
- Shareeny (2003)
- Habibi Ya (2005)
- Ghawy Hob (2006)
- Wala Nos Kelma (2007)
- Been Edeak (2010)
- Ghaly (2010)
- Besohola Keda (2010)
- Ben Edeik (2010)
- Ebn Balad (2010)
- Bashabeh 3alek (2011)
- Tameny 3alek (2011)
